= 2004 Pittsburgh Pirates season =

2004 Pittsburgh Pirates
- League: National League
- Division: Central
- Ballpark: PNC Park
- City: Pittsburgh, Pennsylvania
- Record: 72–89 (.447)
- Divisional place: 5th
- Owners: Kevin McClatchy
- General managers: Dave Littlefield
- Managers: Lloyd McClendon
- Television: Fox Sports Net Pittsburgh
- Radio: KDKA-AM (Steve Blass, Greg Brown, Lanny Frattare, Bob Walk)

The 2004 Pittsburgh Pirates season was the 123rd season of the franchise; the 118th in the National League. This was their fourth season at PNC Park. The Pirates finished fifth in the National League Central with a record of 72–89.

== Offseason ==
- October 2, 2003: Jeff D'Amico was released by the Pittsburgh Pirates.
- February 19, 2004: Randall Simon was signed as a free agent with the Pittsburgh Pirates.
- February 24, 2004: Raúl Mondesí signed as a free agent with the Pittsburgh Pirates.

== Regular season ==
=== Season standings ===
NL Central
Team	W	L	Pct.	GB	Home	Road
St. Louis Cardinals	105	57	.648	—	53‍–‍28	52‍–‍29
Houston Astros	92	70	.568	13	48‍–‍33	44‍–‍37
Chicago Cubs	89	73	.549	16	45‍–‍37	44‍–‍36
Cincinnati Reds	76	86	.469	29	40‍–‍41	36‍–‍45
Pittsburgh Pirates	72	89	.447	32½	39‍–‍41	33‍–‍48
Milwaukee Brewers	67	94	.416	37½	36‍–‍45	31‍–‍49

=== Game log ===
2004 Game Log (72–89)
April (10–11)

#	Date	Opponent	Score	Win	Loss	Save	Attendance	Record
1	April 5	Phillies	2–1	**Wells**	Millwood	**Mesa**	35,702	1–0
2	April 7	Phillies	4–5	Cormier	**Boehringer**	Wagner	15,126	1–1
3	April 8	Phillies	6–2	**Vogelsong**	Padilla	**Mesa**	9,689	2–1
4	April 9	@ Reds	1–5	Harang	**Fogg**	—	27,713	2–2
5	April 10	@ Reds	1–3	Lidle	**Wells**	Graves	23,449	2–3
6	April 11	@ Reds	4–3	**Perez**	Haynes	**Mesa**	16,925	3–3
7	April 12	@ Cubs	13–2	**Benson**	Maddux	**Meadows**	40,483	4–3
8	April 14	@ Cubs	3–8	Clement	**Vogelsong**	—	38,968	4–4
9	April 15	@ Cubs	5–10	Zambrano	**Fogg**	—	39,450	4–5
10	April 16	@ Mets	7–6	**Wells**	Moreno	**Mesa**	18,554	5–5
11	April 17	@ Mets	2–1	**Meadows**	Trachsel	**Mesa**	40,172	6–5
12	April 18	@ Mets	8–1	**Benson**	Seo	—	44,345	7–5
13	April 20	Cubs	1–9	Zambrano	**Vogelsong**	—	11,746	7–6
14	April 21	Cubs	1–12	Mitre	**Fogg**	—	9,933	7–7
15	April 23	Reds	4–6	Wilson	**Wells**	Graves	17,350	7–8
16	April 24	Reds	7–9	Van Poppel	**Benson**	Graves	24,732	7–9
17	April 25	Reds	6–0	**Perez**	Acevedo	—	13,264	8–9
18	April 26	Reds	2–5	Harang	**Vogelsong**	Graves	8,579	8–10
19	April 28	Astros	4–2	**Torres**	Oswalt	**Mesa**	9,813	9–10
20	April 29	Astros	0–2	Pettitte	**Wells**	Dotel	19,485	9–11
21	April 30	@ Brewers	4–2	**Benson**	Sheets	**Mesa**	17,533	10–11

May (13–13)

#	Date	Opponent	Score	Win	Loss	Save	Attendance	Record
22	May 1	@ Brewers	8–7 (10)	**Boyd**	Vizcaino	**Mesa**	25,134	11–11
23	May 2	@ Brewers	4–3 (11)	**Meadows**	Bennett	**Mesa**	16,392	12–11
24	May 4	@ Astros	3–4	Pettitte	**Fogg**	Lidge	31,083	12–12
25	May 5	@ Astros	2–6	Clemens	**Wells**	—	35,883	12–13
26	May 6	@ Astros	2–5	Miller	**Benson**	—	36,055	12–14
27	May 7	Dodgers	0–4	Alvarez	**Perez**	—	20,944	12–15
28	May 8	Dodgers	3–4	Mota	**Torres**	Gagne	26,610	12–16
29	May 9	Dodgers	7–9 (14)	Falkenborg	**Grabow**	—	16,554	12–17
30	May 11	@ Rockies	15–10 (12)	**Torres**	Lopez	—	21,123	13–17
31	May 13	@ Rockies	5–7	Estes	**Benson**	Chacon	—	13–18
32	May 13	@ Rockies	11–2	**Perez**	Jennings	—	20,041	14–18
33	May 14	@ Giants	4–2	**Boehringer**	Rodriguez	**Mesa**	39,955	15–18
34	May 15	@ Giants	6–4	**Fogg**	Tomko	**Mesa**	41,042	16–18
35	May 16	@ Giants	8–1	**Wells**	Williams	—	40,705	17–18
36	May 19	Padres	3–6	Lawrence	**Johnston**	Hoffman	—	17–19
37	May 19	Padres	3–7	Peavy	**Perez**	—	13,366	17–20
38	May 20	Padres	9–7	**Gonzalez**	Puffer	**Mesa**	11,029	18–20
39	May 22	Brewers	3–1	**Fogg**	Sheets	**Mesa**	25,736	19–20
40	May 23	Brewers	1–2	Vizcaino	**Meadows**	Kolb	19,326	19–21
41	May 26	@ Cardinals	11–8	**Benson**	Marquis	—	29,526	20–21
42	May 27	@ Cardinals	3–6	Suppan	**Vogelsong**	Isringhausen	31,107	20–22
43	May 28	Cubs	9–5	**Torres**	Borowski	—	—	21–22
44	May 28	Cubs	5–4 (10)	**Gonzalez**	Beltran	—	24,657	22–22
45	May 29	Cubs	10–7	**Fogg**	Mitre	—	37,806	23–22
46	May 30	Cubs	1–12	Zambrano	**Grabow**	—	30,392	23–23
47	May 31	Cardinals	3–8	Marquis	**Benson**	—	12,582	23–24

June (9–19)

#	Date	Opponent	Score	Win	Loss	Save	Attendance	Record
48	June 1	Cardinals	1–8	Suppan	**Vogelsong**	—	11,540	23–25
49	June 2	Cardinals	3–5	Carpenter	**Johnston**	Isringhausen	12,100	23–26
50	June 3	Cardinals	2–4	Williams	**Perez**	Isringhausen	15,386	23–27
51	June 4	@ Cubs	2–1	**Torres**	Borowski	**Mesa**	40,024	24–27
52	June 5	@ Cubs	1–6	Zambrano	**Benson**	—	39,387	24–28
53	June 6	@ Cubs	1–4	Maddux	**Vogelsong**	Hawkins	39,016	24–29
54	June 7	@ Rangers	5–6 (10)	Cordero	**Johnston**	—	25,286	24–30
55	June 10	@ Rangers	7–9	Francisco	**Meadows**	Cordero	—	24–31
56	June 10	@ Rangers	4–10	Rogers	**Fogg**	—	27,219	24–32
57	June 11	@ Athletics	1–6	Hudson	**Benson**	—	23,435	24–33
58	June 12	@ Athletics	11–12	Rhodes	**Corey**	—	24,606	24–34
59	June 13	@ Athletics	3–13	Mulder	**Wells**	—	34,328	24–35
60	June 15	Angels	2–4	Shields	**Torres**	Rodriguez	19,035	24–36
61	June 16	Angels	5–3	**Fogg**	Lackey	**Mesa**	22,404	25–36
62	June 17	Angels	5–2	**Benson**	Colon	**Mesa**	15,395	26–36
63	June 18	Mariners	4–5	Moyer	**Vogelsong**	Guardado	29,601	26–37
64	June 19	Mariners	1–5	Piñeiro	**Burnett**	—	24,341	26–38
65	June 20	Mariners	4–5	Garcia	**Perez**	Guardado	30,217	26–39
66	June 21	@ Astros	5–7	Bullinger	**Fogg**	Dotel	33,443	26–40
67	June 22	@ Astros	4–5	Oswalt	**Benson**	Lidge	31,819	26–41
68	June 23	@ Astros	7–2	**Vogelsong**	Munro	—	34,242	27–41
69	June 24	@ Astros	2–3	Clemens	**Burnett**	Lidge	39,851	27–42
70	June 25	@ Reds	4–6	Acevedo	**Torres**	Graves	41,959	27–43
71	June 26	@ Reds	1–0	**Corey**	Jones	**Mesa**	41,376	28–43
72	June 27	@ Reds	14–4	**Fogg**	Wilson	—	35,262	29–43
73	June 28	Cardinals	2–1	**Mesa**	Tavarez	—	15,544	30–43
74	June 29	Cardinals	3–0	**Burnett**	Carpenter	**Mesa**	18,152	31–43
75	June 30	Cardinals	6–5	**Mesa**	Tavarez	—	22,368	32–43

July (17–10)

#	Date	Opponent	Score	Win	Loss	Save	Attendance	Record
76	July 2	Brewers	8–1	**Perez**	Davis	—	—	33–43
77	July 2	Brewers	13–2	**Fogg**	Wise	—	30,047	34–43
78	July 3	Brewers	5–3	**Benson**	Obermueller	**Mesa**	28,443	35–43
79	July 4	Brewers	6–2	**Burnett**	Capuano	**Mesa**	19,029	36–43
80	July 5	@ Marlins	3–1	**Wells**	Beckett	**Mesa**	13,224	37–43
81	July 6	@ Marlins	3–6	Bump	**Corey**	Benitez	12,330	37–44
82	July 7	@ Marlins	4–3	**Perez**	Pavano	**Mesa**	15,135	38–44
83	July 8	@ Expos	1–2	Ayala	**Grabow**	Cordero	7,746	38–45
84	July 9	@ Expos	11–0	**Burnett**	Hill	—	7,436	39–45
85	July 10	@ Expos	0–4	Biddle	**Wells**	—	8,780	39–46
86	July 11	@ Expos	1–2	Downs	**Fogg**	Cordero	8,101	39–47
87	July 16	Marlins	6–2	**Benson**	Burnett	**Mesa**	28,563	40–47
88	July 17	Marlins	4–2	**Torres**	Benitez	**Mesa**	26,729	41–47
89	July 18	Marlins	4–2	**Torres**	Koch	**Mesa**	18,048	42–47
90	July 19	Expos	2–6	Horgan	**Grabow**	—	14,787	42–48
91	July 20	Expos	2–1	**Burnett**	Hernandez	**Mesa**	18,075	43–48
92	July 21	@ Braves	4–3	**Benson**	Byrd	**Mesa**	30,131	44–48
93	July 22	@ Braves	1–2 (10)	Reitsma	**Torres**	—	32,963	44–49
94	July 23	Reds	6–3	**Perez**	Acevedo	**Mesa**	37,703	45–49
95	July 24	Reds	14–4	**Grabow**	Harang	—	37,752	46–49
96	July 25	Reds	6–5	**Burnett**	Van Poppel	**Mesa**	24,962	47–49
97	July 26	Braves	2–4	Wright	**Benson**	Smoltz	19,164	47–50
98	July 27	Braves	8–4	**Gonzalez**	Gryboski	—	15,946	48–50
99	July 28	Braves	0–1	Ortiz	**Perez**	Smoltz	22,977	48–51
100	July 29	Braves	2–3	Cruz	**Mesa**	Smoltz	25,988	48–52
101	July 30	@ Brewers	0–5	Davis	**Burnett**	—	34,702	48–53
102	July 31	@ Brewers	4–1	**Vogelsong**	Santos	**Mesa**	35,152	49–53

August (12–17)

#	Date	Opponent	Score	Win	Loss	Save	Attendance	Record
103	August 1	@ Brewers	7–8	Vizcaino	**Meadows**	—	25,047	49–54
104	August 3	@ Dodgers	2–3	Penny	**Perez**	Gagne	34,581	49–55
105	August 4	@ Dodgers	1–2	Lima	**Fogg**	Gagne	34,792	49–56
106	August 5	@ Dodgers	3–8	Weaver	**Burnett**	—	38,852	49–57
107	August 6	@ Padres	1–13	Peavy	**Vogelsong**	—	40,026	49–58
108	August 7	@ Padres	3–1	**Wells**	Wells	**Mesa**	40,681	50–58
109	August 8	@ Padres	4–2	**Perez**	Lawrence	**Mesa**	39,742	51–58
110	August 10	Giants	8–7	**Mesa**	Herges	—	24,930	52–58
111	August 11	Giants	8–6 (11)	**Grabow**	Hermanson	—	25,814	53–58
112	August 12	Giants	0–7	Schmidt	**Vogelsong**	—	24,446	53–59
113	August 13	Rockies	3–9	Fassero	**Wells**	—	27,522	53–60
114	August 14	Rockies	6–1	**Perez**	Wright	—	37,312	54–60
115	August 15	Rockies	3–0	**Fogg**	Kennedy	**Mesa**	24,862	55–60
116	August 16	@ Diamondbacks	8–7 (10)	**Mesa**	Aquino	**Gonzalez**	28,768	56–60
117	August 17	@ Diamondbacks	7–1	**Vogelsong**	Randolph	—	30,030	57–60
118	August 18	@ Diamondbacks	3–6	Fossum	**Van Benschoten**	Aquino	28,066	57–61
119	August 19	@ Cardinals	3–2 (10)	**Mesa**	Kline	**Grabow**	33,854	58–61
120	August 20	@ Cardinals	4–5	Haren	**Fogg**	Isringhausen	32,062	58–62
121	August 20	@ Cardinals	3–5	Carpenter	**Gonzalez**	Isringhausen	38,640	58–63
122	August 21	@ Cardinals	6–10	Suppan	**Burnett**	—	46,017	58–64
123	August 22	@ Cardinals	4–11	Morris	**Vogelsong**	Kline	35,345	58–65
124	August 23	Diamondbacks	4–5	Nance	**Grabow**	Aquino	25,154	58–66
125	August 24	Diamondbacks	3–1	**Perez**	Gonzalez	**Mesa**	16,332	59–66
126	August 25	Diamondbacks	2–1	**Fogg**	Johnson	**Mesa**	24,853	60–66
127	August 27	Cardinals	5–8	Suppan	**Vogelsong**	Isringhausen	27,475	60–67
128	August 28	Cardinals	4–6	Morris	**Figueroa**	Isringhausen	19,167	60–68
129	August 29	Cardinals	0–4	Marquis	**Perez**	Tavarez	25,005	60–69
130	August 30	@ Brewers	5–1	**Fogg**	Hendrickson	—	23,512	61–69
131	August 31	@ Brewers	2–4	Wise	**Van Benschoten**	Kolb	13,704	61–70

September (9–18)

#	Date	Opponent	Score	Win	Loss	Save	Attendance	Record
132	September 1	@ Brewers	5–2 (10)	**Torres**	Bennett	**Mesa**	15,625	62–70
133	September 2	@ Brewers	1–7	Sheets	**Williams**	—	11,763	62–71
134	September 3	@ Astros	6–8	Clemens	**Perez**	Lidge	40,992	62–72
135	September 4	@ Astros	5–6	Qualls	**Figueroa**	Lidge	38,605	62–73
136	September 5	@ Astros	5–10	Munro	**Van Benschoten**	—	40,569	62–74
137	September 6	Brewers	5–9	Glover	**Vogelsong**	Kolb	12,771	62–75
138	September 7	Brewers	2–0	**Williams**	Sheets	**Mesa**	20,563	63–75
–	September 8	Brewers	Cancelled (rain)					
139	September 9	Astros	3–1	**Perez**	Hernandez	**Mesa**	—	64–75
140	September 9	Astros	2–9	Gallo	**Fogg**	—	10,495	64–76
141	September 10	Astros	6–1	**Van Benschoten**	Munro	—	26,097	65–76
142	September 11	Astros	5–2	**Vogelsong**	Backe	**Mesa**	14,877	66–76
143	September 12	Astros	4–5 (10)	Lidge	**Mesa**	Qualls	11,521	66–77
144	September 13	@ Cubs	2–7	Maddux	**Brooks**	—	38,326	66–78
145	September 14	@ Cubs	2–3 (12)	Wellemeyer	**Meadows**	—	38,676	66–79
146	September 15	@ Cubs	5–13	Wuertz	**Perez**	Dempster	38,395	66–80
147	September 18	Mets	7–8 (10)	Yates	**Torres**	Looper	19,236	66–81
148	September 19	Mets	1–0	**Vogelsong**	Heilman	**Mesa**	—	67–81
149	September 19	Mets	6–1	**Williams**	Benson	—	18,219	68–81
150	September 21	Cubs	4–5 (10)	Hawkins	**Torres**	Dempster	12,701	68–82
151	September 22	Cubs	0–1	Zambrano	**Perez**	Remlinger	22,257	68–83
152	September 23	Cubs	3–6	Maddux	**Figueroa**	Hawkins	13,298	68–84
153	September 24	Reds	8–14	Harang	**Vogelsong**	—	29,066	68–85
154	September 25	Reds	4–7	Wilson	**Williams**	Valentine	26,500	68–86
155	September 26	Reds	4–2	**Fogg**	Acevedo	**Mesa**	23,841	69–86
156	September 27	@ Phillies	6–1	**Perez**	Milton	—	30,268	70–86
157	September 29	@ Phillies	4–8	Padilla	**Snell**	—	—	70–87
158	September 29	@ Phillies	3–8	Myers	**Torres**	—	33,127	70–88

October (2–1)

#	Date	Opponent	Score	Win	Loss	Save	Attendance	Record
159	October 1	@ Reds	1–5	Wilson	**Williams**	—	26,841	70–89
160	October 2	@ Reds	3–1	**Fogg**	Van Poppel	**Mesa**	26,128	71–89
161	October 3	@ Reds	2–0	**Perez**	Claussen	**Mesa**	30,854	72–89

Legend: = Win = Loss
Bold = Pirates team member

=== Record vs. opponents ===
2004 National League record Source: MLB Standings Grid – 2004
Team	AZ	ATL	CHC	CIN	COL	FLA	HOU	LAD	MIL	MON	NYM	PHI	PIT	SD	SF	STL	AL
Arizona	—	2–4	4–2	3–3	6–13	3–4	2–4	3–16	3–3	0–6	3–4	1–5	2–4	7–12	5–14	1–5	6–12
Atlanta	4–2	—	3–3	2–4	4–2	14–5	3–3	4–3	4–2	15–4	12–7	10–9	4–2	3–3	4–3	2–4	8–10
Chicago	2–4	3–3	—	9–8	5–1	3–3	10–9	2–4	10–7	3–3	4–2	3–3	13–5	4–2	2–4	8–11	8–4
Cincinnati	3–3	4–2	8–9	—	3–3	4–2	6–11	4–2	10–8	4–2	3–3	3–3	9–10	2–4	3–3	5–14	5-7
Colorado	13–6	2–4	1–5	3–3	—	1–5	1–5	8–11	2–4	2–4	1–5	5–3	2–4	10–9	8–11	1–5	8–10
Florida	4–3	5–14	3–3	2–4	5–1	—	3–3	3–3	4–2	11–8	15–4	12–7	1–5	4–2	2–5	2–4	7–11
Houston	4–2	3–3	9–10	11–6	5–1	3-3	—	1–5	13–6	2–4	2–4	6–0	12–5	2–4	2–4	10–8	7–5
Los Angeles	16–3	3–4	4–2	2–4	11–8	3–3	5–1	—	3–3	4–3	3–3	1–5	6–0	10–9	10–9	2–4	10–8
Milwaukee	3–3	2–4	7–10	8–10	4–2	2–4	6–13	3–3	—	5–1	2–4	0–6	6–12	2–4	1–5	8–9	8–4
Montreal	6–0	4–15	3–3	2–4	4–2	8-11	4–2	3–4	1–5	—	9–10	7–12	4–2	1–6	1–5	3–3	7–11
New York	4–3	7–12	2–4	3–3	5–1	4–15	4–2	3–3	4–2	10–9	—	8–11	1–5	1–6	4–2	1–5	10–8
Philadelphia	5-1	9–10	3–3	3–3	3–5	7–12	0–6	5–1	6–0	12–7	11–8	—	3–3	5–1	2–4	3–3	9–9
Pittsburgh	4–2	2–4	5–13	10–9	4–2	5–1	5–12	0–6	12–6	2–4	5–1	3–3	—	3–3	5–1	5–12	2–10
San Diego	12–7	3–3	2–4	4–2	9–10	2–4	4–2	9–10	4–2	6–1	6–1	1–5	3–3	—	12–7	2–4	8–10
San Francisco	14–5	3–4	4–2	3–3	11–8	5–2	4–2	9–10	5–1	5–1	2–4	4–2	1–5	7–12	—	3–3	11–7
St. Louis	5–1	4–2	11–8	14–5	5–1	4-2	8–10	4–2	9–8	3–3	5–1	3–3	12–5	4–2	3–3	—	11–1

=== Detailed records ===
**National League**
Opponent	W	L	WP	RS	RA
**NL East**
Atlanta Braves	2	4	0.333	17	17
Florida Marlins	5	1	0.833	24	16
Montreal Expos	2	4	0.333	17	15
New York Mets	5	1	0.833	31	17
Philadelphia Phillies	3	3	0.500	25	25
Total	17	13	0.567	114	90
**NL Central**
Chicago Cubs	5	13	0.278	68	115
Cincinnati Reds	10	9	0.526	92	82
Houston Astros	5	12	0.294	65	78
Milwaukee Brewers	12	6	0.667	83	60
St. Louis Cardinals	5	12	0.294	63	96
Total	37	52	0.416	371	431
**NL West**
Arizona Diamondbacks	4	2	0.667	27	21
Colorado Rockies	4	2	0.667	43	29
Los Angeles Dodgers	0	6	0.000	16	30
San Diego Padres	3	3	0.500	23	36
San Francisco Giants	5	1	0.833	34	27
Total	16	14	0.533	143	143
**American League**
Anaheim Angels	2	1	0.667	12	9
Oakland Athletics	0	3	0.000	15	31
Seattle Mariners	0	3	0.000	9	15
Texas Rangers	0	3	0.000	16	25
Total	2	10	0.167	52	80
Season Total	72	89	0.447	680	744

Month	Games	Won	Lost	Win %	RS	RA
April	21	10	11	0.476	85	94
May	26	13	13	0.500	139	141
June	28	9	19	0.321	110	141
July	27	17	10	0.630	120	74
August	29	12	17	0.414	112	144
September	27	9	18	0.333	108	144
October	3	2	1	0.667	6	6
Total	161	72	89	0.447	680	744

	Games	Won	Lost	Win %	RS	RA
Home	80	39	41	0.488	330	347
Away	81	33	48	0.407	350	397
Total	161	72	89	0.447	680	744

== Roster ==
2004 Pittsburgh Pirates
Roster
Pitchers: 34 Kris Benson; 41 Brian Boehringer; 50 Jason Boyd; 57 Frank Brooks; 61 Sean Burnett; 44 Mark Corey; 37 Nelson Figueroa; 27 Josh Fogg; 51 Mike Gonzalez; 39 John Grabow; 37 Mike Johnston; 46 Brian Meadows; 49 José Mesa; 48 Óliver Pérez; 43 Willis Roberts; 53 Ian Snell; 31 Salomón Torres; 47 John Van Benschoten; 22 Ryan Vogelsong; 32 Kip Wells; 58 Dave Williams	Catchers: 11 Humberto Cota; 30 J. R. House; 18 Jason Kendall; Infielders: 14 José Castillo; 17 Bobby Hill; 7 Abraham Núñez; 55 Carlos Rivera; 12 Freddy Sanchez; 35 Randall Simon; 3 Chris Stynes; 31 Daryle Ward; 19 Ty Wigginton; 2 Jack Wilson	Outfielders: 56 Tony Álvarez; 50 José Bautista; 38 Jason Bay; 26 J. J. Davis; 59 Rob Mackowiak; 24 Rubén Mateo; 43 Raúl Mondesí; 5 Tike Redman; 36 Craig Wilson	Manager: 23 Lloyd McClendon; Coaches: 66 Álvaro Espinoza (infield); 15 Rusty Kuntz (first base); 25 Pete Mackanin (bench); 28 Gerald Perry (hitting); 13 John Russell (third base); 52 Bruce Tanner (bullpen); 54 Spin Williams (pitching)

=== Opening Day lineup ===
Opening Day Starters
Name	Position
Tike Redman	CF
Jason Kendall	C
Raúl Mondesí	LF
Randall Simon	1B
Craig Wilson	RF
Bobby Hill	2B
Chris Stynes	3B
Jack Wilson	SS
Kip Wells	SP

== Awards and honors ==
- Jason Bay, NL Rookie of the Year

2004 Major League Baseball All-Star Game

- Jack Wilson, SS, reserve

== Statistics ==
Hitting

Note: G = Games played; AB = At bats; H = Hits; Avg. = Batting average; HR = Home runs; RBI = Runs batted in

Regular season
Player	G	AB	H	Avg.	HR	RBI
M. Gonzalez	44	1	1	1.000	0	2
S. Torres	82	2	1	0.500	0	0
J. Kendall	147	574	183	0.319	3	51
J. Wilson	157	652	201	0.308	11	59
R. Mondesí	26	99	28	0.283	2	14
J. Bay	120	411	116	0.282	26	82
T. Redman	155	546	153	0.280	8	51
B. Hill	126	233	62	0.266	2	27
C. Wilson	155	561	148	0.264	29	82
J. Castillo	129	383	98	0.256	8	39
D. Ward	79	293	73	0.249	15	57
R. Mackowiak	155	491	121	0.246	17	75
R. Mateo	19	33	8	0.242	3	7
A. Núñez	112	182	43	0.236	2	13
H. Cota	36	66	15	0.227	5	8
R. Vogelsong	32	31	7	0.226	0	3
T. Wigginton	58	182	40	0.220	5	24
C. Stynes	74	162	35	0.216	1	16
T. Álvarez	24	38	8	0.211	1	8
J. Bautista	23	40	8	0.200	0	0
C. Rivera	7	15	3	0.200	0	1
R. Simon	61	175	34	0.194	3	14
Ó. Pérez	30	58	11	0.190	0	0
K. Wells	23	43	8	0.186	0	0
K. Benson	19	39	7	0.179	0	3
F. Sanchez	9	19	3	0.158	0	2
J. Davis	25	35	5	0.143	0	3
N. Figueroa	10	7	1	0.143	0	1
J. Van Benschoten	6	8	1	0.125	1	2
J. House	5	9	1	0.111	0	0
D. Williams	10	9	1	0.111	0	0
J. Fogg	31	53	4	0.075	0	3
B. Boehringer	21	1	0	0.000	0	0
F. Brooks	11	1	0	0.000	0	0
S. Burnett	13	23	0	0.000	0	0
M. Corey	27	1	0	0.000	0	0
J. Grabow	64	1	0	0.000	0	0
B. Meadows	65	3	0	0.000	0	1
W. Roberts	9	1	0	0.000	0	0
I. Snell	3	2	0	0.000	0	0
J. Boyd	12	0	0	—	0	0
M. Johnston	20	0	0	—	0	0
J. Mesa	68	0	0	—	0	0
Team totals	161	5,483	1,428	0.260	142	648

Pitching

Note: G = Games pitched; IP = Innings pitched; W = Wins; L = Losses; ERA = Earned run average; SO = Strikeouts

Regular season
Player	G	IP	W	L	ERA	SO
J. Grabow	68	61 2/3	2	5	5.11	64
M. Johnston	24	22 2/3	0	3	4.37	18
N. Figueroa	10	28 1/3	0	3	5.72	10
S. Burnett	13	71 2/3	5	5	5.02	30
J. Van Benschoten	6	28 2/3	1	3	6.91	18
I. Snell	3	12	0	1	7.5	9
B. Boehringer	21	25 1/3	1	1	4.62	20
J. Mesa	70	69 1/3	5	2	3.25	37
R. Vogelsong	31	133	6	13	6.5	92
J. Fogg	32	178 1/3	11	10	4.64	82
W. Roberts	9	12	0	0	5.25	7
M. Corey	31	35 2/3	1	2	4.54	28
K. Benson	20	132 1/3	8	8	4.22	83
K. Wells	24	138 1/3	5	7	4.55	116
J. Boyd	12	13	1	0	5.54	12
B. Meadows	68	78	2	4	3.58	46
S. Torres	84	92	7	7	2.64	62
D. Williams	10	38 2/3	2	3	4.42	33
Ó. Pérez	30	196	12	10	2.98	239
F. Brooks	11	17 1/3	0	1	4.67	18
M. Gonzalez	47	43 1/3	3	1	1.25	55
A. Núñez	1	1/3	0	0	0	0
Team totals	161	1,428	72	89	4.29	1,079

== Transactions ==
- May 21, 2004: Raúl Mondesí was released by the Pittsburgh Pirates.
- June 29, 2004: Scott Sheldon was signed as a free agent with the Pittsburgh Pirates.
- July 30, 2004: Kris Benson was traded by the Pittsburgh Pirates with Jeff Keppinger to the New York Mets for José Bautista, Ty Wigginton, and Matt Peterson (minors).
- August 4, 2004: Chris Stynes was released by the Pittsburgh Pirates.
- August 18, 2004: Randall Simon was released by the Pittsburgh Pirates.

== Draft picks ==
2004 Top 10 Rounds Draft Picks
Rd	#	Player	Pos	DOB and Age	School
1	11	Neil Walker	C	September 10, 1985 (aged 18)	Pine-Richland High School (Gibsonia, Pennsylvania)
2	52	Brian Bixler	SS	October 22, 1982 (aged 21)	Eastern Michigan University (Ypsilanti, Michigan)
3	82	Eddie Prasch	3B	January 25, 1986 (aged 18)	Milton High School (Milton, Georgia)
4	112	Joe Bauserman	RHP	October 4, 1985 (aged 18)	Lincoln High School (Tallahassee, Florida)
5	142	Kyle Bloom	LHP	February 21, 1983 (aged 21)	Illinois State University (Normal, Illinois)
6	172	A.J. Johnson	OF	September 26, 1983 (aged 20)	Tallahassee Community College (Tallahassee, Florida)
7	202	Jason Quarles	RHP	April 20, 1983 (aged 21)	Southern University and A&M College (Baton Rouge, Louisiana)
8	232	Eric Ridener	RHP	September 11, 1985 (aged 18)	J. P. Taravella High School (Coral Springs, Florida)
9	262	Chris Covington	OF	December 12, 1985 (aged 18)	Brookwood High School (Snellville, Georgia)
10	292	Derek Hankins	RHP	July 1, 1983 (aged 20)	University of Memphis (Memphis, Tennessee)

Note

- Age at time of draft.

== Farm system ==
Level	Team	League	Manager
AAA	Nashville Sounds	Pacific Coast League	Trent Jewett
AA	Altoona Curve	Eastern League	Tony Beasley
A	Lynchburg Hillcats	Carolina League	Jay Loviglio and Tom Prince
A	Hickory Crawdads	South Atlantic League	Dave Clark
A-Short Season	Williamsport Crosscutters	New York–Penn League	Jeff Branson
Rookie	GCL Pirates	Gulf Coast League	Woody Huyke

LEAGUE CHAMPIONS: Hickory
