= 2004 Milwaukee Brewers season =

2004 Milwaukee Brewers
- League: National League
- Division: Central
- Ballpark: Miller Park
- City: Milwaukee, Wisconsin, United States
- Record: 67–94 (.416)
- Divisional place: 6th
- Owners: Bud Selig
- General managers: Doug Melvin
- Managers: Ned Yost
- Television: FSN Wisconsin (Daron Sutton, Bill Schroeder)
- Radio: WTMJ (AM) (Bob Uecker, Jim Powell)

The 2004 Milwaukee Brewers season was the 35th season for the Brewers in Milwaukee, their 7th in the National League, and their 36th overall.

They finished sixth in the National League Central with a record of 67 wins and 94 losses. The main highlight of the Brewers season was on the big screen, as the franchise was portrayed fictionally in the sports comedy Mr. 3000, starring Bernie Mac.

== Offseason ==
- November 13, 2003: Chris Coste signed as a free agent with the Milwaukee Brewers.
- December 1, 2003: Lyle Overbay was traded by the Arizona Diamondbacks with Chris Capuano, Craig Counsell, Chad Moeller, Jorge de la Rosa, and Junior Spivey to the Milwaukee Brewers for a player to be named later, Richie Sexson, and Shane Nance. The Milwaukee Brewers sent Noochie Varner (minors) (December 15, 2003) to the Arizona Diamondbacks to complete the trade.
- January 26, 2004: Scott Sheldon was signed as a free agent with the Milwaukee Brewers.

== Regular season ==
=== Season standings ===
==== National League Central ====
NL Central
| Team | W | L | Pct. | GB | Home | Road |
|---|---|---|---|---|---|---|
| St. Louis Cardinals | 105 | 57 | .648 | — | 53‍–‍28 | 52‍–‍29 |
| Houston Astros | 92 | 70 | .568 | 13 | 48‍–‍33 | 44‍–‍37 |
| Chicago Cubs | 89 | 73 | .549 | 16 | 45‍–‍37 | 44‍–‍36 |
| Cincinnati Reds | 76 | 86 | .469 | 29 | 40‍–‍41 | 36‍–‍45 |
| Pittsburgh Pirates | 72 | 89 | .447 | 32½ | 39‍–‍41 | 33‍–‍48 |
| Milwaukee Brewers | 67 | 94 | .416 | 37½ | 36‍–‍45 | 31‍–‍49 |

==== Record vs. opponents ====
2004 National League record Source: MLB Standings Grid – 2004
| Team | AZ | ATL | CHC | CIN | COL | FLA | HOU | LAD | MIL | MON | NYM | PHI | PIT | SD | SF | STL | AL |
|---|---|---|---|---|---|---|---|---|---|---|---|---|---|---|---|---|---|
| Arizona | — | 2–4 | 4–2 | 3–3 | 6–13 | 3–4 | 2–4 | 3–16 | 3–3 | 0–6 | 3–4 | 1–5 | 2–4 | 7–12 | 5–14 | 1–5 | 6–12 |
| Atlanta | 4–2 | — | 3–3 | 2–4 | 4–2 | 14–5 | 3–3 | 4–3 | 4–2 | 15–4 | 12–7 | 10–9 | 4–2 | 3–3 | 4–3 | 2–4 | 8–10 |
| Chicago | 2–4 | 3–3 | — | 9–8 | 5–1 | 3–3 | 10–9 | 2–4 | 10–7 | 3–3 | 4–2 | 3–3 | 13–5 | 4–2 | 2–4 | 8–11 | 8–4 |
| Cincinnati | 3–3 | 4–2 | 8–9 | — | 3–3 | 4–2 | 6–11 | 4–2 | 10–8 | 4–2 | 3–3 | 3–3 | 9–10 | 2–4 | 3–3 | 5–14 | 5-7 |
| Colorado | 13–6 | 2–4 | 1–5 | 3–3 | — | 1–5 | 1–5 | 8–11 | 2–4 | 2–4 | 1–5 | 5–3 | 2–4 | 10–9 | 8–11 | 1–5 | 8–10 |
| Florida | 4–3 | 5–14 | 3–3 | 2–4 | 5–1 | — | 3–3 | 3–3 | 4–2 | 11–8 | 15–4 | 12–7 | 1–5 | 4–2 | 2–5 | 2–4 | 7–11 |
| Houston | 4–2 | 3–3 | 9–10 | 11–6 | 5–1 | 3-3 | — | 1–5 | 13–6 | 2–4 | 2–4 | 6–0 | 12–5 | 2–4 | 2–4 | 10–8 | 7–5 |
| Los Angeles | 16–3 | 3–4 | 4–2 | 2–4 | 11–8 | 3–3 | 5–1 | — | 3–3 | 4–3 | 3–3 | 1–5 | 6–0 | 10–9 | 10–9 | 2–4 | 10–8 |
| Milwaukee | 3–3 | 2–4 | 7–10 | 8–10 | 4–2 | 2–4 | 6–13 | 3–3 | — | 5–1 | 2–4 | 0–6 | 6–12 | 2–4 | 1–5 | 8–9 | 8–4 |
| Montreal | 6–0 | 4–15 | 3–3 | 2–4 | 4–2 | 8-11 | 4–2 | 3–4 | 1–5 | — | 9–10 | 7–12 | 4–2 | 1–6 | 1–5 | 3–3 | 7–11 |
| New York | 4–3 | 7–12 | 2–4 | 3–3 | 5–1 | 4–15 | 4–2 | 3–3 | 4–2 | 10–9 | — | 8–11 | 1–5 | 1–6 | 4–2 | 1–5 | 10–8 |
| Philadelphia | 5-1 | 9–10 | 3–3 | 3–3 | 3–5 | 7–12 | 0–6 | 5–1 | 6–0 | 12–7 | 11–8 | — | 3–3 | 5–1 | 2–4 | 3–3 | 9–9 |
| Pittsburgh | 4–2 | 2–4 | 5–13 | 10–9 | 4–2 | 5–1 | 5–12 | 0–6 | 12–6 | 2–4 | 5–1 | 3–3 | — | 3–3 | 5–1 | 5–12 | 2–10 |
| San Diego | 12–7 | 3–3 | 2–4 | 4–2 | 9–10 | 2–4 | 4–2 | 9–10 | 4–2 | 6–1 | 6–1 | 1–5 | 3–3 | — | 12–7 | 2–4 | 8–10 |
| San Francisco | 14–5 | 3–4 | 4–2 | 3–3 | 11–8 | 5–2 | 4–2 | 9–10 | 5–1 | 5–1 | 2–4 | 4–2 | 1–5 | 7–12 | — | 3–3 | 11–7 |
| St. Louis | 5–1 | 4–2 | 11–8 | 14–5 | 5–1 | 4-2 | 8–10 | 4–2 | 9–8 | 3–3 | 5–1 | 3–3 | 12–5 | 4–2 | 3–3 | — | 11–1 |

=== Transactions ===
- June 14, 2004: Scott Sheldon was released by the Milwaukee Brewers.
- July 26, 2004: Russell Branyan was sent to the Milwaukee Brewers by the Cleveland Indians as part of a conditional deal.

=== Roster ===
2004 Milwaukee Brewers
Roster
| Pitchers: 46 Mike Adams; 57 Jeff Bennett; 43 Dave Burba; 39 Chris Capuano; 49 Doug Davis; 47 Jorge de la Rosa; 48,38 Ben Ford; 58 Gary Glover; 40 Ben Hendrickson; 31 Adrian Hernández; 55 Brooks Kieschnick; 50 Matt Kinney; 41 Dan Kolb; 48 Pedro Liriano; 33 Wes Obermueller; 50 Travis Phelps; 38 Chris Saenz; 53 Víctor Santos; 15 Ben Sheets; 51 Luis Vizcaíno; 26 Matt Wise | Catchers: 29 Gary Bennett; 8 Mark Johnson; 21 Chad Moeller; Infielders: 31 Russell Branyan; 30 Craig Counsell; 22 Trent Durrington; 8 Matt Erickson; 6 Keith Ginter; 2 Bill Hall; 18 Wes Helms; 11 Lyle Overbay; 37 Junior Spivey | Outfielders: 27 Brady Clark; 12 Ben Grieve; 5 Geoff Jenkins; 10 Dave Krynzel; 9 Jeff Liefer; 24 Chris Magruder; 20 Scott Podsednik; Other batters: 1 Corey Hart | Manager: 3 Ned Yost; Coaches: 35 Bill Castro (Bullpen); 25 Rich Dauer (bench); 45 Rich Donnelly (third base); 36 Mike Maddux (pitching); 14 Dave Nelson (first base); 16 Butch Wynegar (hitting) |

== Player stats ==
=== Batting ===
==== Starters by position ====
Note: Pos = Position; G = Games played; AB = At bats; H = Hits; Avg. = Batting average; HR = Home runs; RBI = Runs batted in

| Pos | Player | G | AB | H | Avg. | HR | RBI |
|---|---|---|---|---|---|---|---|
| C | Chad Moeller | 101 | 317 | 66 | .208 | 5 | 27 |
| 1B | Lyle Overbay | 159 | 579 | 174 | .301 | 16 | 87 |
| 2B | Junior Spivey | 59 | 228 | 62 | .272 | 7 | 28 |
| SS | Craig Counsell | 140 | 473 | 114 | .241 | 2 | 23 |
| 3B | Wes Helms | 92 | 274 | 72 | .263 | 4 | 28 |
| LF | Geoff Jenkins | 157 | 617 | 163 | .264 | 27 | 93 |
| CF | Scott Podsednik | 154 | 640 | 156 | .244 | 12 | 39 |
| RF | Brady Clark | 138 | 353 | 99 | .280 | 7 | 46 |

==== Other batters ====
Note: G = Games played; AB = At bats; H = Hits; Avg. = Batting average; HR = Home runs; RBI = Runs batted in

| Player | G | AB | H | Avg. | HR | RBI |
|---|---|---|---|---|---|---|
| Bill Hall | 126 | 390 | 93 | .238 | 9 | 53 |
| Keith Ginter | 113 | 386 | 101 | .262 | 19 | 60 |
| Ben Grieve | 108 | 234 | 61 | .261 | 7 | 29 |
| Gary Bennett | 75 | 219 | 49 | .224 | 3 | 20 |
| Russell Branyan | 51 | 158 | 37 | .234 | 11 | 27 |
| Chris Magruder | 56 | 89 | 21 | .236 | 2 | 10 |
| Trent Durrington | 53 | 82 | 19 | .232 | 2 | 4 |
| Dave Krynzel | 16 | 41 | 9 | .220 | 0 | 3 |
| Jeff Liefer | 16 | 28 | 6 | .214 | 1 | 5 |
| Mark Johnson | 7 | 11 | 1 | .091 | 0 | 2 |
| Matt Erickson | 4 | 6 | 1 | .167 | 0 | 0 |
| Corey Hart | 1 | 1 | 0 | .000 | 0 | 0 |

=== Pitching ===
==== Starting pitchers ====
Note: G = Games pitched; IP = Innings pitched; W = Wins; L = Losses; ERA = Earned run average; SO = Strikeouts

| Player | G | IP | W | L | ERA | SO |
|---|---|---|---|---|---|---|
| Ben Sheets | 34 | 237.0 | 12 | 14 | 2.70 | 264 |
| Doug Davis | 34 | 207.1 | 12 | 12 | 3.39 | 166 |
| Víctor Santos | 31 | 154.0 | 11 | 12 | 4.97 | 115 |
| Wes Obermueller | 25 | 118.0 | 6 | 8 | 5.80 | 59 |
| Chris Capuano | 17 | 88.1 | 6 | 8 | 4.99 | 80 |
| Ben Hendrickson | 10 | 46.1 | 1 | 8 | 6.22 | 29 |
| Jorge De La Rosa | 5 | 22.2 | 0 | 3 | 6.35 | 5 |
| Gary Glover | 4 | 18.0 | 2 | 1 | 3.50 | 8 |
| Chris Saenz | 1 | 6.0 | 1 | 0 | 0.00 | 7 |

==== Other pitchers ====
Note: G = Games pitched; IP = Innings pitched; W = Wins; L = Losses; ERA = Earned run average; SO = Strikeouts

| Player | G | IP | W | L | ERA | SO |
|---|---|---|---|---|---|---|
| Matt Kinney | 32 | 62.1 | 3 | 4 | 5.78 | 52 |
| Adrián Hernández | 6 | 16.0 | 0 | 2 | 8.44 | 14 |

==== Relief pitchers ====
Note: G = Games pitched; W = Wins; L = Losses; SV = Saves; ERA = Earned run average; SO = Strikeouts

| Player | G | W | L | SV | ERA | SO |
|---|---|---|---|---|---|---|
| Danny Kolb | 64 | 0 | 4 | 39 | 2.98 | 21 |
| Luis Vizcaíno | 73 | 4 | 4 | 1 | 3.75 | 63 |
| Jeff Bennett | 60 | 1 | 5 | 0 | 4.79 | 45 |
| Mike Adams | 46 | 2 | 3 | 0 | 3.40 | 39 |
| Dave Burba | 45 | 3 | 1 | 2 | 4.08 | 47 |
| Brooks Kieschnick | 32 | 1 | 1 | 0 | 3.77 | 28 |
| Matt Wise | 30 | 1 | 2 | 0 | 4.44 | 30 |
| Ben Ford | 19 | 1 | 1 | 0 | 6.38 | 13 |
| Pedro Liriano | 11 | 0 | 0 | 0 | 4.02 | 10 |
| Travis Phelps | 4 | 0 | 1 | 0 | 10.50 | 3 |
| Trent Durrington | 1 | 0 | 0 | 0 | 0.00 | 0 |

== Farm system ==
The Brewers' farm system consisted of six minor league affiliates in 2004.

| Level | Team | League | Manager |
|---|---|---|---|
| Triple-A | Indianapolis Indians | International League | Cecil Cooper |
| Double-A | Huntsville Stars | Southern League | Frank Kremblas |
| Class A-Advanced | High Desert Mavericks | California League | Mel Queen |
| Class A | Beloit Snappers | Midwest League | Don Money |
| Rookie | Helena Brewers | Pioneer League | Johnny Narron |
| Rookie | AZL Brewers | Arizona League | Mike Guerrero |
