= 2004 San Diego Padres season =

2004 San Diego Padres
- League: National League
- Division: West
- Ballpark: Petco Park
- City: San Diego, California
- Record: 87–75 (.537)
- Divisional place: 3rd
- Owners: John Moores
- General managers: Kevin Towers
- Managers: Bruce Bochy
- Television: 4SD (Mark Grant, Matt Vasgersian, Rick Sutcliffe, Tim Flannery)
- Radio: XEPRS-AM (Jerry Coleman, Ted Leitner); XEMO (Juan Angel Avila, Eduardo Ortega)

The 2004 San Diego Padres season was the 36th season in franchise history. It saw the club finish with a record of 87–75, the fifth most wins in franchise history. With 87 wins, the Padres improved their win–loss record by 23 games over the 2003 season (64–98), the single largest improvement from one full season to the next in team history. This was the Padres' first winning season since 1998. The Padres also moved into their new home Petco Park, which drew a total of 3,016,752 fans to 81 home games, shattering all previous attendance marks.

== Offseason ==
- November 26, 2003: Mark Kotsay was traded by the San Diego Padres to the Oakland Athletics for Terrence Long and Ramón Hernández.

== Regular season ==
=== Petco Park ===

Petco Park is an open-air stadium in downtown San Diego, California. It opened in 2004, replacing Qualcomm Stadium as the home park of Major League Baseball's San Diego Padres. Before then, the Padres shared Qualcomm Stadium with the NFL's San Diego Chargers. The stadium is named after the animal and pet supplies retailer PETCO, which is based in San Diego and paid for the naming rights.

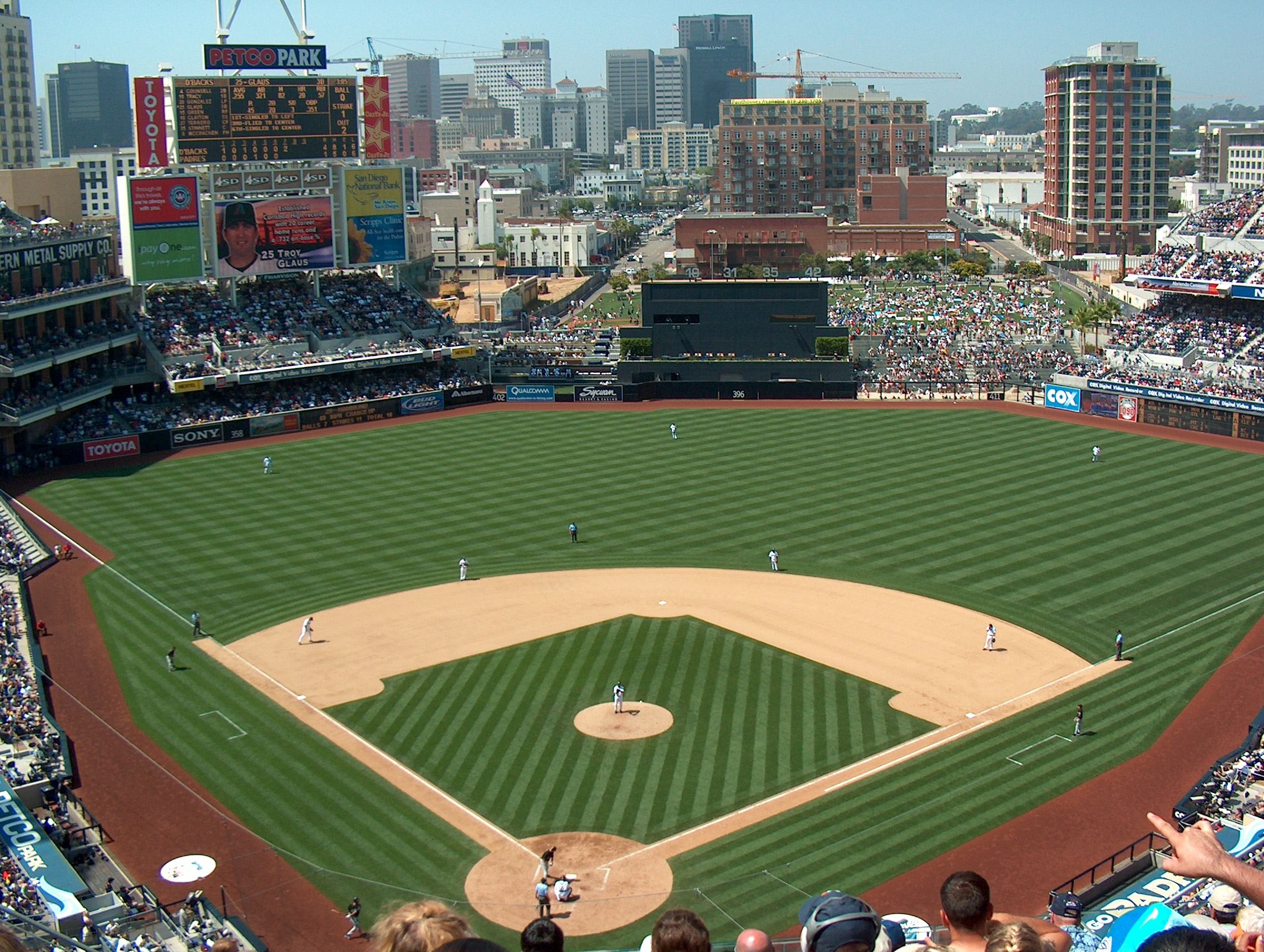
The interior of Petco Park with the San Diego skyline in background.

=== Opening Day starters ===
Player	Pos
Sean Burroughs	3B
Mark Loretta	2B
Brian Giles	RF
Phil Nevin	1B
Ryan Klesko	LF
Jay Payton	CF
Ramón Hernández	C
Khalil Greene	SS
David Wells	LHP

=== Season standings ===
==== National League West ====
NL West
Team	W	L	Pct.	GB	Home	Road
Los Angeles Dodgers	93	69	.574	—	49‍–‍32	44‍–‍37
San Francisco Giants	91	71	.562	2	47‍–‍35	44‍–‍36
San Diego Padres	87	75	.537	6	42‍–‍39	45‍–‍36
Colorado Rockies	68	94	.420	25	38‍–‍43	30‍–‍51
Arizona Diamondbacks	51	111	.315	42	29‍–‍52	22‍–‍59

==== Record vs. opponents ====
2004 National League record Source: MLB Standings Grid – 2004
Team	AZ	ATL	CHC	CIN	COL	FLA	HOU	LAD	MIL	MON	NYM	PHI	PIT	SD	SF	STL	AL
Arizona	—	2–4	4–2	3–3	6–13	3–4	2–4	3–16	3–3	0–6	3–4	1–5	2–4	7–12	5–14	1–5	6–12
Atlanta	4–2	—	3–3	2–4	4–2	14–5	3–3	4–3	4–2	15–4	12–7	10–9	4–2	3–3	4–3	2–4	8–10
Chicago	2–4	3–3	—	9–8	5–1	3–3	10–9	2–4	10–7	3–3	4–2	3–3	13–5	4–2	2–4	8–11	8–4
Cincinnati	3–3	4–2	8–9	—	3–3	4–2	6–11	4–2	10–8	4–2	3–3	3–3	9–10	2–4	3–3	5–14	5-7
Colorado	13–6	2–4	1–5	3–3	—	1–5	1–5	8–11	2–4	2–4	1–5	5–3	2–4	10–9	8–11	1–5	8–10
Florida	4–3	5–14	3–3	2–4	5–1	—	3–3	3–3	4–2	11–8	15–4	12–7	1–5	4–2	2–5	2–4	7–11
Houston	4–2	3–3	9–10	11–6	5–1	3-3	—	1–5	13–6	2–4	2–4	6–0	12–5	2–4	2–4	10–8	7–5
Los Angeles	16–3	3–4	4–2	2–4	11–8	3–3	5–1	—	3–3	4–3	3–3	1–5	6–0	10–9	10–9	2–4	10–8
Milwaukee	3–3	2–4	7–10	8–10	4–2	2–4	6–13	3–3	—	5–1	2–4	0–6	6–12	2–4	1–5	8–9	8–4
Montreal	6–0	4–15	3–3	2–4	4–2	8-11	4–2	3–4	1–5	—	9–10	7–12	4–2	1–6	1–5	3–3	7–11
New York	4–3	7–12	2–4	3–3	5–1	4–15	4–2	3–3	4–2	10–9	—	8–11	1–5	1–6	4–2	1–5	10–8
Philadelphia	5-1	9–10	3–3	3–3	3–5	7–12	0–6	5–1	6–0	12–7	11–8	—	3–3	5–1	2–4	3–3	9–9
Pittsburgh	4–2	2–4	5–13	10–9	4–2	5–1	5–12	0–6	12–6	2–4	5–1	3–3	—	3–3	5–1	5–12	2–10
San Diego	12–7	3–3	2–4	4–2	9–10	2–4	4–2	9–10	4–2	6–1	6–1	1–5	3–3	—	12–7	2–4	8–10
San Francisco	14–5	3–4	4–2	3–3	11–8	5–2	4–2	9–10	5–1	5–1	2–4	4–2	1–5	7–12	—	3–3	11–7
St. Louis	5–1	4–2	11–8	14–5	5–1	4-2	8–10	4–2	9–8	3–3	5–1	3–3	12–5	4–2	3–3	—	11–1

=== Roster ===
2004 San Diego Padres
Roster
Pitchers: 43 Andy Ashby; 47 Rod Beck; 54 Mike Bynum; 53 Adam Eaton; 47 Justin Germano; 41 Sterling Hitchcock; 51 Trevor Hoffman; 50 Brian Lawrence; 38 Scott Linebrink; 54 Marty McLeary; 39 Blaine Neal; 43,54 Eddie Oropesa; 13 Antonio Osuna; 16 Akinori Otsuka; 44 Jake Peavy; 58 Brandon Puffer; 52 Ricky Stone; 37 Brian Sweeney; 58 Jason Szuminski; 49 Dennis Tankersley; 59 Ismael Valdez; 58 Steve Watkins; 33 David Wells; 46 Jay Witasick	Catchers: 55 Ramón Hernández; 20 Miguel Ojeda; 11 Humberto Quintero; Infielders: 21 Rich Aurilia; 32 Sean Burroughs; 7 Jeff Cirillo; 29 Robert Fick; 9 Alex Gonzalez; 3 Khalil Greene; 27 Dave Hansen; 8 Mark Loretta; 23 Phil Nevin; 1 Ramón Vázquez	Outfielders: 34 Brian Buchanan; 24 Brian Giles; 7 Freddy Guzmán; 30 Ryan Klesko; 10 Jon Knott; 14 Terrence Long; 22 Xavier Nady; 17 Jay Payton; 2 Kerry Robinson; Other batters: 18 Darren Bragg	Manager: 15 Bruce Bochy; Coaches: 48 Darrel Akerfelds (bullpen); 36 Darren Balsley (pitching); 27,25 Davey Lopes (first base); 12 Dave Magadan (hitting); 40 Tony Muser (bench); 5 Rob Picciolo (third base)

== Player stats ==
=== Batting ===
==== Starters by position ====
Note: Pos = Position; G = Games played; AB = At bats; H = Hits; Avg. = Batting average; HR = Home runs; RBI = Runs batted in

Pos	Player	G	AB	H	Avg.	HR	RBI
C	Ramón Hernández	111	384	106	.276	18	63
1B	Phil Nevin	147	547	158	.289	26	105
2B	Mark Loretta	154	620	208	.335	16	76
SS	Khalil Greene	139	484	132	.273	15	65
3B	Sean Burroughs	130	523	156	.298	2	43
LF	Ryan Klesko	127	402	117	.291	9	66
CF	Jay Payton	143	458	119	.260	8	55
RF	Brian Giles	159	609	173	.284	23	94

==== Other batters ====
Note: G = Games played; AB = At bats; H = Hits; Avg. = Batting average; HR = Home runs; RBI = Runs batted in

Player	G	AB	H	Avg.	HR	RBI
Terrence Long	136	288	85	.295	3	28
Miguel Ojeda	62	156	40	.256	8	26
Rich Aurilia	51	138	35	.254	2	16
Ramón Vázquez	52	115	27	.235	1	13
Kerry Robinson	80	92	27	.293	0	5
Xavier Nady	34	77	19	.247	3	9
Freddy Guzmán	20	76	16	.211	0	5
Jeff Cirillo	33	75	16	.213	1	7
Humberto Quintero	23	72	18	.250	2	10
Brian Buchanan	38	60	12	.200	2	6
Dave Hansen	29	28	4	.143	0	0
Alex Gonzalez	11	23	4	.174	0	3
Jon Knott	9	14	3	.214	0	1
Robert Fick	13	12	2	.167	0	0
Darren Bragg	9	7	1	.143	0	0

=== Pitching ===
==== Starting pitchers ====
Note: G = Games pitched; IP = Innings pitched; W = Wins; L = Losses; ERA = Earned run average; SO = Strikeouts

Player	G	IP	W	L	ERA	SO
Brian Lawrence	34	203.0	15	14	4.12	121
Adam Eaton	33	199.1	11	14	4.61	153
David Wells	31	195.2	12	8	3.73	101
Jake Peavy	27	166.1	15	6	2.27	173
Ismael Valdéz	23	114.0	9	6	5.53	37
Sterling Hitchcock	4	21.1	0	3	6.33	14

==== Other pitchers ====
Note: G = Games pitched; IP = Innings pitched; W = Wins; L = Losses; ERA = Earned run average; SO = Strikeouts

Player	G	IP	W	L	ERA	SO
Dennis Tankersley	9	35.0	0	5	5.14	29
Justin Germano	7	21.1	1	2	8.86	16
Brian Sweeney	7	14.1	1	0	5.65	10

==== Relief pitchers ====
Note: G = Games pitched; W = Wins; L = Losses; SV = Saves; ERA = Earned run average; SO = Strikeouts

Player	G	W	L	SV	ERA	SO
Trevor Hoffman	55	3	3	41	2.30	53
Scott Linebrink	73	7	3	0	2.14	83
Akinori Otsuka	73	7	2	2	1.75	87
Jay Witasick	44	0	1	1	3.21	57
Blaine Neal	40	1	1	0	4.07	36
Antonio Osuna	31	2	1	0	2.48	36
Ricky Stone	27	1	1	0	6.89	22
Rod Beck	26	0	2	0	6.38	15
Eddie Oropesa	16	2	1	0	11.00	6
Brandon Puffer	14	0	1	0	5.50	12
Steve Watkins	11	0	0	0	6.28	7
Jason Szuminski	7	0	0	0	7.20	5
Marty McLeary	3	0	0	0	14.73	4
Andy Ashby	2	0	0	0	0.00	2
Mike Bynum	2	0	1	0	54.00	0

== Award winners ==
- Trevor Hoffman, Hutch Award
- Jake Peavy, ERA Champion (2.27)

2004 Major League Baseball All-Star Game

- Mark Loretta, second base, reserve

== Farm system ==
Level	Team	League	Manager
AAA	Portland Beavers	Pacific Coast League	Craig Colbert
AA	Mobile BayBears	Southern League	Gary Jones
A	Lake Elsinore Storm	California League	Rick Renteria
A	Fort Wayne Wizards	Midwest League	Randy Ready
A-Short Season	Eugene Emeralds	Northwest League	Roy Howell
Rookie	AZL Padres	Arizona League	Carlos Lezcano

LEAGUE CO-CHAMPIONS: Mobile
