= Mike Johnston (baseball) =

American baseball player (born 1979)

- Pitcher
- Born: March 30, 1979 (age 46); Philadelphia, Pennsylvania
- Batted: Left Threw: Left

MLB debut
- April 7, 2004, for the Pittsburgh Pirates

Last MLB appearance
- June 24, 2005, for the Pittsburgh Pirates

MLB statistics
- Win–loss record: 0–3
- Earned run average: 5.70
- Strikeouts: 20
- Stats at Baseball Reference

Teams
- Pittsburgh Pirates (2004–2005)

Michael Charles Johnston (born March 30, 1979) is a former baseball player. In 2004, Johnston made the Pirates team out of spring training despite never previously pitching above the AA level. By doing so, Johnston became the second known person with Tourette syndrome to play in Major League Baseball, after Jim Eisenreich. In October 2006, Johnston underwent surgery to repair a torn labrum. That November, he signed a minor league contract with the San Diego Padres. The Chicago White Sox signed him to a minor league contract for the 2009 season. In 2012, he pitched for the Lancaster Barnstormers of the Atlantic League of Professional Baseball.
