= 2004 Chicago Cubs season =

2004 Chicago Cubs
- League: National League
- Division: Central
- Ballpark: Wrigley Field
- City: Chicago
- Record: 89–73 (54,9%)
- Divisional place: 3rd
- Owners: Tribune Company
- General managers: Jim Hendry
- Managers: Dusty Baker
- Television: WCIU-TV; Superstation WGN; FSN Chicago (Chip Caray, Steve Stone)
- Radio: WGN (Pat Hughes, Ron Santo)
- Stats: ESPN.com; Baseball Reference

The 2004 Chicago Cubs season was the 133rd season of the Chicago Cubs franchise, the 129th in the National League and the 89th at Wrigley Field. The Cubs attempted to make a push for the National League pennant after their shocking end to 2003. The Cubs finished 89–73 (an improvement from their 2003 record), good for third in the National League Central. Despite the strong record, the Cubs faltered down the stretch and did not make the playoffs. The season is largely viewed as one of the most disappointing seasons in franchise history.

== Offseason ==
- November 25, 2003: Derrek Lee was traded by the Florida Marlins to the Chicago Cubs for Hee-seop Choi and Mike Nannini (minors).
- December 2, 2003: Scott McClain was signed as a free agent with the Chicago Cubs.
- December 18, 2003: Todd Hollandsworth was signed as a free agent with the Chicago Cubs.
- March 23, 2004: Greg Maddux was signed as a free agent with the Chicago Cubs.

== Regular season ==
In 2004, despite the return of Greg Maddux and a midseason deal for Nomar Garciaparra, misfortune struck the Cubs again. They led the Wild Card by 1.5 games over San Francisco and Houston on September 25, and both of those teams lost that day, giving the Northsiders a chance at increasing the lead to a commanding 2.5 games with only eight games remaining in the season, but reliever LaTroy Hawkins blew a save to the Mets, allowing a three-run game-tying home run with two outs in the ninth. The Cubs lost the game in extra innings, a defeat that seemingly deflated the team, as they proceeded to drop 6 of their last 8 games, including back-to-back 12 inning games to the lowly Cincinnati Reds at home, as the Astros won the Wild Card. Despite the fact that the Cubs had won 89 games, this fallout was decidedly unlovable, as the Cubs traded superstar Sammy Sosa after he had left the season's final game early.

=== Season standings ===
==== National League Central Division ====
NL Central
Team	W	L	Pct.	GB	Home	Road
St. Louis Cardinals	105	57	.648	—	53‍–‍28	52‍–‍29
Houston Astros	92	70	.568	13	48‍–‍33	44‍–‍37
Chicago Cubs	89	73	.549	16	45‍–‍37	44‍–‍36
Cincinnati Reds	76	86	.469	29	40‍–‍41	36‍–‍45
Pittsburgh Pirates	72	89	.447	32½	39‍–‍41	33‍–‍48
Milwaukee Brewers	67	94	.416	37½	36‍–‍45	31‍–‍49

==== Record vs. opponents ====
2004 National League record Source: MLB Standings Grid – 2004
Team	AZ	ATL	CHC	CIN	COL	FLA	HOU	LAD	MIL	MON	NYM	PHI	PIT	SD	SF	STL	AL
Arizona	—	2–4	4–2	3–3	6–13	3–4	2–4	3–16	3–3	0–6	3–4	1–5	2–4	7–12	5–14	1–5	6–12
Atlanta	4–2	—	3–3	2–4	4–2	14–5	3–3	4–3	4–2	15–4	12–7	10–9	4–2	3–3	4–3	2–4	8–10
Chicago	2–4	3–3	—	9–8	5–1	3–3	10–9	2–4	10–7	3–3	4–2	3–3	13–5	4–2	2–4	8–11	8–4
Cincinnati	3–3	4–2	8–9	—	3–3	4–2	6–11	4–2	10–8	4–2	3–3	3–3	9–10	2–4	3–3	5–14	5-7
Colorado	13–6	2–4	1–5	3–3	—	1–5	1–5	8–11	2–4	2–4	1–5	5–3	2–4	10–9	8–11	1–5	8–10
Florida	4–3	5–14	3–3	2–4	5–1	—	3–3	3–3	4–2	11–8	15–4	12–7	1–5	4–2	2–5	2–4	7–11
Houston	4–2	3–3	9–10	11–6	5–1	3-3	—	1–5	13–6	2–4	2–4	6–0	12–5	2–4	2–4	10–8	7–5
Los Angeles	16–3	3–4	4–2	2–4	11–8	3–3	5–1	—	3–3	4–3	3–3	1–5	6–0	10–9	10–9	2–4	10–8
Milwaukee	3–3	2–4	7–10	8–10	4–2	2–4	6–13	3–3	—	5–1	2–4	0–6	6–12	2–4	1–5	8–9	8–4
Montreal	6–0	4–15	3–3	2–4	4–2	8-11	4–2	3–4	1–5	—	9–10	7–12	4–2	1–6	1–5	3–3	7–11
New York	4–3	7–12	2–4	3–3	5–1	4–15	4–2	3–3	4–2	10–9	—	8–11	1–5	1–6	4–2	1–5	10–8
Philadelphia	5-1	9–10	3–3	3–3	3–5	7–12	0–6	5–1	6–0	12–7	11–8	—	3–3	5–1	2–4	3–3	9–9
Pittsburgh	4–2	2–4	5–13	10–9	4–2	5–1	5–12	0–6	12–6	2–4	5–1	3–3	—	3–3	5–1	5–12	2–10
San Diego	12–7	3–3	2–4	4–2	9–10	2–4	4–2	9–10	4–2	6–1	6–1	1–5	3–3	—	12–7	2–4	8–10
San Francisco	14–5	3–4	4–2	3–3	11–8	5–2	4–2	9–10	5–1	5–1	2–4	4–2	1–5	7–12	—	3–3	11–7
St. Louis	5–1	4–2	11–8	14–5	5–1	4-2	8–10	4–2	9–8	3–3	5–1	3–3	12–5	4–2	3–3	—	11–1

=== Transactions ===
- April 1, 2004: Scott McClain was released by the Chicago Cubs.
- April 3, 2004: Trenidad Hubbard was released by the Chicago Cubs.
- April 12, 2004: Trenidad Hubbard was signed as a free agent with the Chicago Cubs.
- June 7, 2004: Sam Fuld was drafted by the Chicago Cubs in the 10th round of the 2004 amateur draft. Player signed July 9, 2004.
- July 30, 2004: Denny Hocking was signed as a free agent with the Chicago Cubs.
- July 31, 2004: Alex Gonzalez was traded as part of a 4-team trade by the Chicago Cubs with Francis Beltrán and Brendan Harris to the Montreal Expos. The Boston Red Sox sent Nomar Garciaparra and Matt Murton to the Chicago Cubs. The Minnesota Twins sent Doug Mientkiewicz to the Boston Red Sox. The Montreal Expos sent Orlando Cabrera to the Boston Red Sox. The Chicago Cubs sent Justin Jones (minors) to the Minnesota Twins.

=== Roster ===
2004 Chicago Cubs
Roster
Pitchers: 49 Jimmy Anderson; 53 Francis Beltrán; 48 Joe Borowski; 30 Matt Clement; 46 Ryan Dempster; 44 Kyle Farnsworth; 32 LaTroy Hawkins; 51 Jon Leicester; 31 Greg Maddux; 50 Kent Mercker; 52 Sergio Mitre; 29 Andy Pratt; 22 Mark Prior; 37 Mike Remlinger; 33 Glendon Rusch; 40 Todd Wellemeyer; 34 Kerry Wood; 43 Michael Wuertz; 38 Carlos Zambrano	Catchers: 9 Paul Bako; 8 Michael Barrett; 19 Mike DiFelice; Infielders: 5 Nomar Garciaparra; 8 Alex Gonzalez; 11 Mark Grudzielanek; 19 Brendan Harris; 19 Damian Jackson; 25 Derrek Lee; 1 José Macías; 6 Ramón Martínez; 13,29 Rey Ordóñez; 13 Neifi Pérez; 16 Aramis Ramírez; 7 Todd Walker	Outfielders: 18 Moisés Alou; 4 Jason Dubois; 24 Tom Goodwin; 29 Ben Grieve; 28 Todd Hollandsworth; 27 David Kelton; 17 Calvin Murray; 20 Corey Patterson; 21 Sammy Sosa	Manager: 12 Dusty Baker; Coaching Staff: 2 Gene Clines (first base); 15 Sonny Jackson (special asst); 3 Wendell Kim (third base); 59 Juan Lopez (bullpen); 36 Gary Matthews (hitting); 39 Dick Pole (bench); 41 Larry Rothschild (pitching)

== Player stats ==
=== Batting ===
==== Starters by position ====
Note: Pos = Position; G = Games played; AB = At bats; H = Hits; Avg. = Batting average; HR = Home runs; RBI = Runs batted in

Pos	Player	G	AB	H	Avg.	HR	RBI
C	Michael Barrett	134	456	131	.287	16	65
1B	Derrek Lee	161	605	168	.278	32	98
2B	Todd Walker	129	372	102	.274	15	50
SS	Ramón Martínez	102	260	64	.246	3	30
3B	Aramis Ramírez	145	547	174	.318	36	103
LF	Moises Alou	155	601	176	.293	39	106
CF	Corey Patterson	157	631	168	.266	24	72
RF	Sammy Sosa	126	478	121	.253	35	80

==== Other batters ====
Note: G = Games played; AB = At bats; H = Hits; Avg. = Batting average; HR = Home runs; RBI = Runs batted in

Player	G	AB	H	Avg.	HR	RBI
Mark Grudzielanek	81	257	79	.307	6	23
José Macías	98	194	52	.268	3	22
Nomar Garciaparra	43	165	49	.297	4	20
Todd Hollandsworth	57	148	47	.318	8	22
Paul Bako	49	138	28	.203	1	10
Alex Gonzalez	37	129	28	.217	3	8
Tom Goodwin	77	105	21	.200	0	3
Neifi Pérez	23	62	23	.371	2	6
Rey Ordóñez	23	61	10	.164	1	5
Jason Dubois	20	23	5	.217	1	5
Ben Grieve	15	16	4	.250	1	6
Damian Jackson	7	15	1	.067	1	1
David Kelton	8	10	1	.100	0	0
Brendan Harris	3	9	2	.222	0	1
Calvin Murray	11	5	1	.200	0	1
Mike DiFelice	4	3	0	.000	0	0

=== Pitching ===
==== Starting pitchers ====
Note: G = Games pitched; IP = Innings pitched; W = Wins; L = Losses; ERA = Earned run average; SO = Strikeouts

Player	G	IP	W	L	ERA	SO
Greg Maddux	33	212.2	16	11	4.02	151
Carlos Zambrano	31	209.2	16	8	2.75	188
Matt Clement	30	181.0	9	13	3.68	190
Kerry Wood	22	140.1	8	9	3.72	144
Mark Prior	21	118.2	6	4	4.02	139

==== Other pitchers ====
Note: G = Games pitched; IP = Innings pitched; W = Wins; L = Losses; ERA = Earned run average; SO = Strikeouts

Player	G	IP	W	L	ERA	SO
Glendon Rusch	32	129.2	6	2	3.47	90
Sergio Mitre	12	51.2	2	4	6.62	37

==== Relief pitchers ====
Note: G = Games pitched; W = Wins; L = Losses; SV = Saves; ERA = Earned run average; SO = Strikeouts

Player	G	W	L	SV	ERA	SO
LaTroy Hawkins	77	5	4	25	2.63	69
Kyle Farnsworth	72	4	5	0	4.73	78
Kent Mercker	71	3	1	0	2.55	51
Mike Remlinger	48	1	2	2	3.44	35
Francis Beltrán	34	2	2	0	4.63	40
Jon Leicester	32	5	1	0	3.89	35
Michael Wuertz	31	1	0	1	4.34	30
Ryan Dempster	23	1	1	2	3.92	18
Joe Borowski	22	2	4	9	8.02	17
Todd Wellemeyer	20	2	1	0	5.92	30
Jimmy Anderson	7	0	0	1	4.66	3
Andy Pratt	4	0	1	0	21.60	1

== Farm system ==
Level	Team	League	Manager
AAA	Iowa Cubs	Pacific Coast League	Mike Quade
AA	West Tenn Diamond Jaxx	Southern League	Bobby Dickerson
A	Daytona Cubs	Florida State League	Steve McFarland
A	Lansing Lugnuts	Midwest League	Julio Garcia
A-Short Season	Boise Hawks	Northwest League	Tom Beyers
Rookie	AZL Cubs	Arizona League	Trey Forkerway

LEAGUE CHAMPIONS: Boise; LEAGUE CO-CHAMPIONS: Daytona
