= 2004 Cincinnati Reds season =

2004 Cincinnati Reds
- League: National League
- Division: Central
- Ballpark: Great American Ball Park
- City: Cincinnati
- Record: 76–86 (.469)
- Divisional place: 4th
- Owners: Carl Lindner
- General managers: Dan O'Brien Jr.
- Managers: Dave Miley
- Television: FSN Ohio (George Grande, Chris Welsh)
- Radio: WLW (Marty Brennaman, Joe Nuxhall, Steve Stewart)
- Stats: ESPN.com; Baseball Reference

The 2004 Cincinnati Reds season was the 135th season for the franchise in Major League Baseball, and their second season at Great American Ball Park in Cincinnati. They improved on their 69–93 record from 2003.

== Offseason ==
- January 14, 2004: John Vander Wal was signed as a free agent with the Cincinnati Reds.
- March 14, 2004: John Vander Wal was released by the Cincinnati Reds.
- March 17, 2004: John Vander Wal was signed as a free agent with the Cincinnati Reds.

== Regular season ==
=== Season summary ===
The Reds finished with a final record of 76–86. That earned them fourth place in their division. They finished 29 games behind the division winner and eventual National League champion, the St. Louis Cardinals. The Reds also finished 16 games behind the second place team and National League wild card winner, the Houston Astros. The Reds finished 13 games behind the third place team, the Chicago Cubs. They finished 3½ games ahead of the fifth place team, the Pittsburgh Pirates, and 8½ games ahead of the sixth place team, the Milwaukee Brewers.

=== Season standings ===
==== National League Central ====
NL Central
Team	W	L	Pct.	GB	Home	Road
St. Louis Cardinals	105	57	.648	—	53‍–‍28	52‍–‍29
Houston Astros	92	70	.568	13	48‍–‍33	44‍–‍37
Chicago Cubs	89	73	.549	16	45‍–‍37	44‍–‍36
Cincinnati Reds	76	86	.469	29	40‍–‍41	36‍–‍45
Pittsburgh Pirates	72	89	.447	32½	39‍–‍41	33‍–‍48
Milwaukee Brewers	67	94	.416	37½	36‍–‍45	31‍–‍49

==== Record vs. opponents ====
2004 National League record Source: MLB Standings Grid – 2004
Team	AZ	ATL	CHC	CIN	COL	FLA	HOU	LAD	MIL	MON	NYM	PHI	PIT	SD	SF	STL	AL
Arizona	—	2–4	4–2	3–3	6–13	3–4	2–4	3–16	3–3	0–6	3–4	1–5	2–4	7–12	5–14	1–5	6–12
Atlanta	4–2	—	3–3	2–4	4–2	14–5	3–3	4–3	4–2	15–4	12–7	10–9	4–2	3–3	4–3	2–4	8–10
Chicago	2–4	3–3	—	9–8	5–1	3–3	10–9	2–4	10–7	3–3	4–2	3–3	13–5	4–2	2–4	8–11	8–4
Cincinnati	3–3	4–2	8–9	—	3–3	4–2	6–11	4–2	10–8	4–2	3–3	3–3	9–10	2–4	3–3	5–14	5-7
Colorado	13–6	2–4	1–5	3–3	—	1–5	1–5	8–11	2–4	2–4	1–5	5–3	2–4	10–9	8–11	1–5	8–10
Florida	4–3	5–14	3–3	2–4	5–1	—	3–3	3–3	4–2	11–8	15–4	12–7	1–5	4–2	2–5	2–4	7–11
Houston	4–2	3–3	9–10	11–6	5–1	3-3	—	1–5	13–6	2–4	2–4	6–0	12–5	2–4	2–4	10–8	7–5
Los Angeles	16–3	3–4	4–2	2–4	11–8	3–3	5–1	—	3–3	4–3	3–3	1–5	6–0	10–9	10–9	2–4	10–8
Milwaukee	3–3	2–4	7–10	8–10	4–2	2–4	6–13	3–3	—	5–1	2–4	0–6	6–12	2–4	1–5	8–9	8–4
Montreal	6–0	4–15	3–3	2–4	4–2	8-11	4–2	3–4	1–5	—	9–10	7–12	4–2	1–6	1–5	3–3	7–11
New York	4–3	7–12	2–4	3–3	5–1	4–15	4–2	3–3	4–2	10–9	—	8–11	1–5	1–6	4–2	1–5	10–8
Philadelphia	5-1	9–10	3–3	3–3	3–5	7–12	0–6	5–1	6–0	12–7	11–8	—	3–3	5–1	2–4	3–3	9–9
Pittsburgh	4–2	2–4	5–13	10–9	4–2	5–1	5–12	0–6	12–6	2–4	5–1	3–3	—	3–3	5–1	5–12	2–10
San Diego	12–7	3–3	2–4	4–2	9–10	2–4	4–2	9–10	4–2	6–1	6–1	1–5	3–3	—	12–7	2–4	8–10
San Francisco	14–5	3–4	4–2	3–3	11–8	5–2	4–2	9–10	5–1	5–1	2–4	4–2	1–5	7–12	—	3–3	11–7
St. Louis	5–1	4–2	11–8	14–5	5–1	4-2	8–10	4–2	9–8	3–3	5–1	3–3	12–5	4–2	3–3	—	11–1

=== Notable transactions ===
- April 6, 2004: Kenny Kelly was signed as a free agent with the Cincinnati Reds.

=== Roster ===
2004 Cincinnati Reds
Roster
Pitchers: 29 José Acevedo; 31 Jung Bong; 34 Brandon Claussen; 32 Danny Graves; 43 Josh Hancock; 39 Aaron Harang; 43 Jimmy Haynes; 54 Luke Hudson; 59 Todd Jones; 15 Cory Lidle; 33 Mike Matthews; 56 Aaron Myette; 51 Phil Norton; 60 Juan Padilla; 52 Brian Reith; 46 John Riedling; 41 Jesús Sánchez; 48 Joe Valentine; 45 Todd Van Poppel; 38 Ryan Wagner; 36 Gabe White; 40 Paul Wilson	Catchers: 23 Jason LaRue; 22 Corky Miller; 17 Javier Valentín; Infielders: 21 Sean Casey; 7 Juan Castro; 60 Tim Hummel; 3 D'Angelo Jiménez; 11 Barry Larkin; 16 Brandon Larson; 2 Felipe López; 19 Andy Machado; 4 Ray Olmedo	Outfielders: 15 Darren Bragg; 57 Jermaine Clark; 9 Jacob Cruz; 44 Adam Dunn; 6 Ryan Freel; 30 Ken Griffey Jr.; 28 Austin Kearns; 26 Wily Mo Peña; 10 Jason Romano; 25 John Vander Wal	Manager: 12 Dave Miley; Coaches: 55 Mark Berry (third base); 49 Chris Chambliss (hitting); 35 Don Gullett (pitching); 47 Tom Hume (bullpen); 50 Jerry Narron (bench); 53 Randy Whisler (first base)

== Player stats ==
=== Batting ===
==== Starters by position ====
Note: Pos = Position; G = Games played; AB = At bats; H = Hits; Avg. = Batting average; HR = Home runs; RBI = Runs batted in

Pos	Player	G	AB	H	Avg.	HR	RBI
C	Jason LaRue	114	390	98	.251	14	55
1B	Sean Casey	146	571	185	.324	24	99
2B	D'Angelo Jiménez	152	563	152	.270	12	67
SS	Barry Larkin	111	346	100	.289	8	44
3B	Ryan Freel	143	505	140	.277	3	28
LF	Adam Dunn	161	568	151	.266	46	102
CF	Ken Griffey Jr.	83	300	76	.253	20	60
RF	Austin Kearns	64	217	50	.230	9	32

==== Other batters ====
Note: G = Games played; AB = At bats; H = Hits; Avg. = Batting average; HR = Home runs; RBI = Runs batted in

Player	G	AB	H	Avg.	HR	RBI
Wily Mo Peña	110	336	87	.259	26	66
Juan Castro	111	299	73	.244	5	26
Felipe López	79	264	64	.242	7	31
Javier Valentín	82	202	47	.233	6	20
Jacob Cruz	96	147	33	.224	3	28
Brandon Larson	40	118	25	.212	3	14
Tim Hummel	56	110	24	.218	1	7
Darren Bragg	38	94	18	.191	4	9
Anderson Machado	17	56	15	.268	0	4
John Vander Wal	42	51	6	.118	2	4
Corky Miller	13	39	1	.026	0	3
Jermaine Clark	14	30	4	.133	0	2
Jason Romano	22	26	4	.154	1	3
Ray Olmedo	8	1	0	.000	0	0

=== Pitching ===
==== Starting pitchers ====
Note: G = Games pitched; IP = Innings pitched; W = Wins; L = Losses; ERA = Earned run average; SO = Strikeouts

Player	G	IP	W	L	ERA	SO
Paul Wilson	29	183.2	11	6	4.36	117
Aaron Harang	28	161.0	10	9	4.86	125
Cory Lidle	24	149.0	7	10	5.32	93
Brandon Claussen	14	66.0	2	8	6.14	45
Josh Hancock	12	54.2	5	1	4.45	31
Luke Hudson	9	48.1	4	2	2.42	38
Jung Bong	3	15.1	1	1	4.70	11
Jesús Sánchez	3	14.1	0	2	7.53	8

==== Other pitchers ====
Note: G = Games pitched; IP = Innings pitched; W = Wins; L = Losses; ERA = Earned run average; SO = Strikeouts

Player	G	IP	W	L	ERA	SO
José Acevedo	39	157.2	5	12	5.94	117
Todd Van Poppel	48	115.1	4	6	6.09	72
Jimmy Haynes	5	15.0	0	3	9.60	8

==== Relief pitchers ====
Note: G = Games pitched; W = Wins; L = Losses; SV = Saves; ERA = Earned run average; SO = Strikeouts

Player	G	W	L	SV	ERA	SO
Danny Graves	68	1	6	41	3.95	40
John Riedling	70	5	3	0	5.10	46
Phil Norton	69	2	5	0	5.07	48
Todd Jones	51	8	2	1	3.79	37
Ryan Wagner	49	3	2	0	4.70	37
Gabe White	40	1	2	1	6.23	33
Mike Matthews	35	2	1	0	6.30	15
Joe Valentine	24	2	3	4	5.22	29
Brian Reith	22	2	2	0	7.27	24
Juan Padilla	12	1	0	0	10.67	12
Aaron Myette	5	0	0	0	8.31	6

== Farm system ==
Level	Team	League	Manager
AAA	Louisville Bats	International League	Rick Burleson
AA	Chattanooga Lookouts	Southern League	Jayhawk Owens
A	Potomac Cannons	Carolina League	Edgar Caceres
A	Dayton Dragons	Midwest League	Alonzo Powell
Rookie	GCL Reds	Gulf Coast League	Freddie Benavides
Rookie	Billings Mustangs	Pioneer League	Donnie Scott
