= Steve Watkins (baseball) =

American baseball player

- Pitcher
- Born: July 19, 1978 (age 48); Lubbock, Texas
- Batted: Right Threw: Right

MLB debut
- August 21, 2004, for the San Diego Padres

Last MLB appearance
- October 2, 2004, for the San Diego Padres

MLB statistics
- Win–loss record: 0–0
- Earned run average: 6.28
- Strikeouts: 7

CPBL statistics
- Win–loss record: 6–13
- Earned run average: 4.19
- Strikeouts: 85
- Stats at Baseball Reference

Teams
- San Diego Padres (2004); Chinatrust Whales (2008)

Stephen Douglas Watkins (born July 19, 1978) is an American former professional baseball player who pitched in Major League Baseball and the Chinese Professional Baseball League.

== Career ==
Watkins was drafted by the San Diego Padres in the 16th round of the 1998 Major League Baseball draft and made his major league debut on August 21, 2004. In 2005, he played in the Cleveland Indians organization and in the Washington Nationals organization in 2006. In 2007, with the Padres' Triple-A affiliate, the Portland Beavers, he went 2-5 with a 5.17 ERA and 56 strikeouts. In 2008, he pitched for the Chinatrust Whales in Taiwan's Chinese Professional Baseball League.
