= Pedro Liriano =

Dominican baseball player (born 1980)

- Starting pitcher
- Born: October 23, 1980 (age 45); Fantino, Dominican Republic
- Batted: Right Threw: Right

MLB debut
- August 27, 2004, for the Milwaukee Brewers

Last MLB appearance
- September 18, 2005, for the Philadelphia Phillies

MLB statistics
- Win–loss record: 0–0
- Earned run average: 6.17
- Strikeouts: 16
- Stats at Baseball Reference

Teams
- Milwaukee Brewers (2004); Philadelphia Phillies (2005)

Pedro Antonio Liriano (born October 23, 1980) is a Dominican former professional baseball starting pitcher. He played in Major League Baseball for the Milwaukee Brewers (2004) and Philadelphia Phillies (2005).

In 2006, Liriano played for the San Francisco Giants' Triple-A affiliate, the Fresno Grizzlies. In 2007, he played for the Los Angeles Angels of Anaheim's Triple-A affiliate, the Salt Lake Bees. In 28 games (25 starts), he was 4–12 with a 5.59 ERA and 67 strikeouts. Liriano played for the Tecolotes de Nuevo Laredo of the Mexican League in 2010. He last played in 2014, in the independent Atlantic League.
