= 2004 Arizona Diamondbacks season =

2004 Arizona Diamondbacks
- League: National League
- Division: West
- Ballpark: Bank One Ballpark
- City: Phoenix, Arizona
- Record: 51–111 (.315)
- Divisional place: 5th
- Owners: Ken Kendrick; Jerry Colangelo
- General managers: Joe Garagiola, Jr.
- Managers: Bob Brenly and Al Pedrique
- Television: FSN Arizona; KTVK (3TV) (Thom Brennaman, Mark Grace, Greg Schulte, Joe Garagiola)
- Radio: KTAR (620 AM) (Greg Schulte, Jeff Munn, Ken Phelps)
- Stats: ESPN.com; Baseball Reference

The 2004 Arizona Diamondbacks season was the franchise's 7th season in Major League Baseball and their 7th season at Bank One Ballpark in Phoenix, Arizona, as members of the National League West.

They looked to improve on their 84–78 record from 2003. The Diamondbacks hoped to contend for a postseason berth in what was a weaker National League West than in years past. However, just three years after winning a World Series title, the Diamondbacks instead finished the season with a record of 51–111, the worst record by any National League team since the 1965 Mets won one fewer game. This was the Diamondbacks' first losing season since 1998. The one highlight of a disastrous season was when Randy Johnson pitched a perfect game on May 18, 2004. The franchise record would not be threatened until 2021, when they finished 52–110. Despite the 110-loss season in 2021, the Diamondbacks didn't earn the first overall pick in the 2022 MLB Draft, as the Baltimore Orioles finished with a 52–110 record, but were worse due to records against American League opponents.

== Offseason ==
- November 28, 2003: Curt Schilling was traded by the Diamondbacks to the Boston Red Sox for Casey Fossum, Brandon Lyon, Jorge de la Rosa, and Michael Goss (minors).
- November 29, 2003: Jesse Orosco was signed as a free agent with the Diamondbacks.
- December 1, 2003: Lyle Overbay, Chris Capuano, Craig Counsell, Chad Moeller, Jorge de la Rosa, and Junior Spivey were traded by the Diamondbacks to the Milwaukee Brewers for Richie Sexson, Shane Nance and a player to be named later. The Brewers completed the deal by sending Noochie Varner (minors) to the Diamondbacks on December 15.
- December 4, 2003: Félix José was signed as a free agent by the Diamondbacks.
- December 15, 2003: Quinton McCracken was traded by the Diamondbacks to the Seattle Mariners for Greg Colbrunn and cash.
- December 18, 2003: Brent Mayne was signed as a free agent by the Diamondbacks.
- February 25, 2004: Bobby Estalella was signed as a free agent by the Diamondbacks.
- February 25, 2004: Scott Service was signed as a free agent by the Diamondbacks.

== Regular season ==
=== Opening Day lineup ===
12	Steve Finley	CF
2	Roberto Alomar	2B
20	Luis Gonzalez	LF
44	Richie Sexson	1B
10	Alex Cintron	SS
28	Shea Hillenbrand	3B
29	Danny Bautista	RF
6	Brent Mayne	C
51	Randy Johnson	P

=== Season standings ===
==== National League West ====
NL West
Team	W	L	Pct.	GB	Home	Road
Los Angeles Dodgers	93	69	.574	—	49‍–‍32	44‍–‍37
San Francisco Giants	91	71	.562	2	47‍–‍35	44‍–‍36
San Diego Padres	87	75	.537	6	42‍–‍39	45‍–‍36
Colorado Rockies	68	94	.420	25	38‍–‍43	30‍–‍51
Arizona Diamondbacks	51	111	.315	42	29‍–‍52	22‍–‍59

==== Record vs. opponents ====
2004 National League record Source: MLB Standings Grid – 2004
Team	AZ	ATL	CHC	CIN	COL	FLA	HOU	LAD	MIL	MON	NYM	PHI	PIT	SD	SF	STL	AL
Arizona	—	2–4	4–2	3–3	6–13	3–4	2–4	3–16	3–3	0–6	3–4	1–5	2–4	7–12	5–14	1–5	6–12
Atlanta	4–2	—	3–3	2–4	4–2	14–5	3–3	4–3	4–2	15–4	12–7	10–9	4–2	3–3	4–3	2–4	8–10
Chicago	2–4	3–3	—	9–8	5–1	3–3	10–9	2–4	10–7	3–3	4–2	3–3	13–5	4–2	2–4	8–11	8–4
Cincinnati	3–3	4–2	8–9	—	3–3	4–2	6–11	4–2	10–8	4–2	3–3	3–3	9–10	2–4	3–3	5–14	5-7
Colorado	13–6	2–4	1–5	3–3	—	1–5	1–5	8–11	2–4	2–4	1–5	5–3	2–4	10–9	8–11	1–5	8–10
Florida	4–3	5–14	3–3	2–4	5–1	—	3–3	3–3	4–2	11–8	15–4	12–7	1–5	4–2	2–5	2–4	7–11
Houston	4–2	3–3	9–10	11–6	5–1	3-3	—	1–5	13–6	2–4	2–4	6–0	12–5	2–4	2–4	10–8	7–5
Los Angeles	16–3	3–4	4–2	2–4	11–8	3–3	5–1	—	3–3	4–3	3–3	1–5	6–0	10–9	10–9	2–4	10–8
Milwaukee	3–3	2–4	7–10	8–10	4–2	2–4	6–13	3–3	—	5–1	2–4	0–6	6–12	2–4	1–5	8–9	8–4
Montreal	6–0	4–15	3–3	2–4	4–2	8-11	4–2	3–4	1–5	—	9–10	7–12	4–2	1–6	1–5	3–3	7–11
New York	4–3	7–12	2–4	3–3	5–1	4–15	4–2	3–3	4–2	10–9	—	8–11	1–5	1–6	4–2	1–5	10–8
Philadelphia	5-1	9–10	3–3	3–3	3–5	7–12	0–6	5–1	6–0	12–7	11–8	—	3–3	5–1	2–4	3–3	9–9
Pittsburgh	4–2	2–4	5–13	10–9	4–2	5–1	5–12	0–6	12–6	2–4	5–1	3–3	—	3–3	5–1	5–12	2–10
San Diego	12–7	3–3	2–4	4–2	9–10	2–4	4–2	9–10	4–2	6–1	6–1	1–5	3–3	—	12–7	2–4	8–10
San Francisco	14–5	3–4	4–2	3–3	11–8	5–2	4–2	9–10	5–1	5–1	2–4	4–2	1–5	7–12	—	3–3	11–7
St. Louis	5–1	4–2	11–8	14–5	5–1	4-2	8–10	4–2	9–8	3–3	5–1	3–3	12–5	4–2	3–3	—	11–1

=== Notable transactions ===
- June 11, 2004: Quinton McCracken was signed as a free agent by the Diamondbacks.
- July 31, 2004: Steve Finley and Brent Mayne were traded by the Diamondbacks to the Los Angeles Dodgers in exchange for Reggie Abercrombie (minors), Koyie Hill and Bill Murphy.
- August 19, 2004: Elmer Dessens was traded by the Diamondbacks to the Los Angeles Dodgers in exchange for Jereme Milons (minors).

=== Roster ===
2004 Arizona Diamondbacks
Roster
Pitchers: 41 Greg Aquino; 39 Brian Bruney; 33 Randy Choate; 32 Lance Cormier; 54 Casey Daigle; 45 Elmer Dessens; 45 Chad Durbin; 13 Jeff Fassero; 39 Mike Fetters; 16 Casey Fossum; 49 Édgar González; 52 Andrew Good; 44 Mike Gosling; 51 Randy Johnson; 22 Mike Koplove; 31 Matt Mantei; 40 Shane Nance; 34 Stephen Randolph; 37 Shane Reynolds; 36 Scott Service; 23 Steve Sparks; 47 José Valverde; 43 Brandon Villafuerte; 56 Óscar Villarreal; 55 Brandon Webb	Catchers: 48 Juan Brito; 17 Bobby Estalella; 7 Robby Hammock; 15 Koyie Hill; 6 Brent Mayne; 19 Chris Snyder; Infielders: 2,12 Roberto Alomar; 3 Carlos Baerga; 10 Alex Cintrón; 2 Jerry Gil; 1 Andy Green; 5 Scott Hairston; 28 Shea Hillenbrand; 8 Matt Kata; 14 Tim Olson; 11 Richie Sexson; 18 Chad Tracy; 25 Alan Zinter	Outfielders: 29 Danny Bautista; 26 Doug DeVore; 12 Steve Finley; 20 Luis Gonzalez; 43 Josh Kroeger; 4 Quinton McCracken; 4 Donnie Sadler; 27 Luis Terrero; Other batters: 35 Greg Colbrunn	Manager: 15 Bob Brenly; 21 Al Pedrique; Coaches: 24 Lorenzo Bundy (bench); 13 Mark Davis (bullpen/pitching); 17 Tommy Jones (first base); 50 Chuck Kniffin (pitching); 50 Dennis Lewallyn (bullpen); 21 Al Pedrique (third base); 9 Rick Schu (hitting); 53 Glenn Sherlock (first base/third base); 19 Robin Yount (bench)

== Player stats ==
=== Batting ===
==== Starters by position ====
Note: Pos = Position; G = Games played; AB = At bats; H = Hits; Avg. = Batting average; HR = Home runs; RBI = Runs batted in

Pos	Player	G	AB	H	Avg.	HR	RBI
C	Juan Brito	54	171	35	.205	3	12
1B	Shea Hillenbrand	148	562	174	.310	15	80
2B	Scott Hairston	101	339	84	.248	13	29
SS	Alex Cintrón	154	564	148	.262	4	49
3B	Chad Tracy	143	481	137	.285	8	53
LF	Luis Gonzalez	105	379	98	.259	17	48
CF	Steve Finley	104	404	111	.275	23	48
RF	Danny Bautista	141	539	154	.286	11	65

==== Other batters ====
Note: G = Games played; AB = At bats; H = Hits; Avg. = Batting average; HR = Home runs; RBI = Runs batted in

Player	G	AB	H	Avg.	HR	RBI
Luis Terrero	62	229	56	.245	4	14
Robby Hammock	62	195	47	.241	4	18
Matt Kata	42	162	40	.247	2	13
Quinton McCracken	55	156	45	.288	2	13
Roberto Alomar	38	110	34	.309	3	16
Andy Green	46	109	22	.202	1	4
Doug DeVore	50	107	24	.224	3	13
Tim Olson	48	97	18	.186	2	5
Chris Snyder	29	96	23	.240	5	15
Brent Mayne	36	94	24	.255	0	10
Richie Sexson	23	90	21	.233	9	23
Jerry Gil	29	86	15	.174	0	8
Carlos Baerga	79	85	20	.235	2	11
Josh Kroeger	22	54	9	.167	0	2
Koyie Hill	13	36	9	.250	1	6
Alan Zinter	28	34	7	.206	1	6
Greg Colbrunn	20	27	3	.111	0	1
Donnie Sadler	18	23	3	.130	0	0
Bobby Estalella	7	14	2	.143	2	4

=== Pitching ===
==== Starting pitchers ====
Note: G = Games pitched; GS = Games started; IP = Innings pitched; W = Wins; L = Losses; ERA = Earned run average; SO = Strikeouts

Player	G	GS	IP	W	L	ERA	SO
Randy Johnson	35	35	245.2	16	14	2.60	290
Brandon Webb	35	35	208.0	7	16	3.59	164
Casey Fossum	27	27	142.0	4	15	6.65	117
Casey Daigle	10	10	49.0	2	3	7.16	17
Édgar González	10	10	46.1	0	9	9.32	31
Shane Reynolds	1	1	2.0	0	1	4.50	0

==== Other pitchers ====
Note: G = Games pitched; IP = Innings pitched; W = Wins; L = Losses; ERA = Earned run average; SO = Strikeouts

Player	G	IP	W	L	ERA	SO
Steve Sparks	29	120.2	3	7	6.04	57
Elmer Dessens	38	85.1	1	6	4.75	55
Lance Cormier	17	45.1	1	4	8.14	24
Mike Gosling	6	25.1	1	1	4.62	14

==== Relief pitchers ====
Note: G = Games pitched; W = Wins; L = Losses; SV = Saves; ERA = Earned run average; SO = Strikeouts

Player	G	W	L	SV	ERA	SO
Greg Aquino	34	0	2	16	3.06	26
Mike Koplove	76	4	4	2	4.05	55
Randy Choate	74	2	4	0	4.62	49
Stephen Randolph	45	2	5	0	5.51	62
Brian Bruney	30	3	4	0	4.31	34
José Valverde	29	1	2	8	4.25	38
Mike Fetters	23	0	1	1	8.68	14
Scott Service	21	1	1	0	7.08	17
Brandon Villafuerte	20	0	3	0	4.05	13
Shane Nance	19	1	1	0	5.84	9
Andrew Good	17	1	2	0	5.31	26
Óscar Villarreal	17	0	2	0	7.00	17
Matt Mantei	12	0	3	4	11.81	13
Chad Durbin	7	1	1	0	8.68	10
Jeff Fassero	1	0	0	0	0.00	1

== Farm system ==
Level	Team	League	Manager
AAA	Tucson Sidewinders	Pacific Coast League	Chip Hale
AA	El Paso Diablos	Texas League	Scott Coolbaugh
A	Lancaster JetHawks	California League	Wally Backman
A	South Bend Silver Hawks	Midwest League	Tony Perezchica
A-Short Season	Yakima Bears	Northwest League	Bill Plummer
Rookie	Missoula Osprey	Pioneer League	Jim Presley
