= 2004 Florida Marlins season =

2004 Florida Marlins
- League: National League
- Division: East
- Ballpark: Pro Player Stadium
- City: Miami Gardens, Florida
- Record: 83–79 (.512)
- Divisional place: 3rd
- Owners: Jeffrey Loria
- General managers: Larry Beinfest
- Managers: Jack McKeon
- Television: FSN Florida; WPXM (Len Kasper, Tommy Hutton)
- Radio: WQAM (Dave Van Horne, Jon Sciambi); WQBA (Spanish) (Felo Ramírez, Luis Quintana)

The 2004 Florida Marlins season was the 12th season for the Major League Baseball (MLB) franchise in the National League. It would begin with the team attempting to improve on their season from 2003, where they were the defending World Series champion, having won the World Series in six games against the New York Yankees. Their manager was Jack McKeon. They played most of their home games at Pro Player Stadium. They played two against the Montreal Expos at Chicago's U.S. Cellular Field due to Hurricane Ivan. The team started off 8–1, but then collapsed and finished with a record of 83–79, third in the National League East, and missed the playoffs.

== Offseason ==
- November 25, 2003: Derrek Lee was traded by the Florida Marlins to the Chicago Cubs for Hee-seop Choi and Mike Nannini (minors).
- December 4, 2003: Matt Treanor was signed as a free agent with the Florida Marlins.

== Regular season ==
=== Season standings ===
==== National League East ====
NL East
Team	W	L	Pct.	GB	Home	Road
Atlanta Braves	96	66	.593	—	49‍–‍32	47‍–‍34
Philadelphia Phillies	86	76	.531	10	42‍–‍39	44‍–‍37
Florida Marlins	83	79	.512	13	42‍–‍38	41‍–‍41
New York Mets	71	91	.438	25	38‍–‍43	33‍–‍48
Montreal Expos	67	95	.414	29	35‍–‍45	32‍–‍50

==== Record vs. opponents ====
2004 National League record Source: MLB Standings Grid – 2004
Team	AZ	ATL	CHC	CIN	COL	FLA	HOU	LAD	MIL	MON	NYM	PHI	PIT	SD	SF	STL	AL
Arizona	—	2–4	4–2	3–3	6–13	3–4	2–4	3–16	3–3	0–6	3–4	1–5	2–4	7–12	5–14	1–5	6–12
Atlanta	4–2	—	3–3	2–4	4–2	14–5	3–3	4–3	4–2	15–4	12–7	10–9	4–2	3–3	4–3	2–4	8–10
Chicago	2–4	3–3	—	9–8	5–1	3–3	10–9	2–4	10–7	3–3	4–2	3–3	13–5	4–2	2–4	8–11	8–4
Cincinnati	3–3	4–2	8–9	—	3–3	4–2	6–11	4–2	10–8	4–2	3–3	3–3	9–10	2–4	3–3	5–14	5-7
Colorado	13–6	2–4	1–5	3–3	—	1–5	1–5	8–11	2–4	2–4	1–5	5–3	2–4	10–9	8–11	1–5	8–10
Florida	4–3	5–14	3–3	2–4	5–1	—	3–3	3–3	4–2	11–8	15–4	12–7	1–5	4–2	2–5	2–4	7–11
Houston	4–2	3–3	9–10	11–6	5–1	3-3	—	1–5	13–6	2–4	2–4	6–0	12–5	2–4	2–4	10–8	7–5
Los Angeles	16–3	3–4	4–2	2–4	11–8	3–3	5–1	—	3–3	4–3	3–3	1–5	6–0	10–9	10–9	2–4	10–8
Milwaukee	3–3	2–4	7–10	8–10	4–2	2–4	6–13	3–3	—	5–1	2–4	0–6	6–12	2–4	1–5	8–9	8–4
Montreal	6–0	4–15	3–3	2–4	4–2	8-11	4–2	3–4	1–5	—	9–10	7–12	4–2	1–6	1–5	3–3	7–11
New York	4–3	7–12	2–4	3–3	5–1	4–15	4–2	3–3	4–2	10–9	—	8–11	1–5	1–6	4–2	1–5	10–8
Philadelphia	5-1	9–10	3–3	3–3	3–5	7–12	0–6	5–1	6–0	12–7	11–8	—	3–3	5–1	2–4	3–3	9–9
Pittsburgh	4–2	2–4	5–13	10–9	4–2	5–1	5–12	0–6	12–6	2–4	5–1	3–3	—	3–3	5–1	5–12	2–10
San Diego	12–7	3–3	2–4	4–2	9–10	2–4	4–2	9–10	4–2	6–1	6–1	1–5	3–3	—	12–7	2–4	8–10
San Francisco	14–5	3–4	4–2	3–3	11–8	5–2	4–2	9–10	5–1	5–1	2–4	4–2	1–5	7–12	—	3–3	11–7
St. Louis	5–1	4–2	11–8	14–5	5–1	4-2	8–10	4–2	9–8	3–3	5–1	3–3	12–5	4–2	3–3	—	11–1

=== Opening Day starters ===
- Juan Pierre – CF
- Luis Castillo – 2B
- Miguel Cabrera – RF
- Mike Lowell – 3B
- Jeff Conine – LF
- Hee-Seop Choi – 1B
- Ramón Castro – C
- Álex González – SS
- Josh Beckett – SP

=== Transactions ===
- May 6, 2004: Josías Manzanillo was signed as a free agent with the Florida Marlins.
- June 17, 2004: Billy Koch was traded by the Chicago White Sox to the Florida Marlins for Wilson Valdez and cash.
- July 30, 2004: Paul Lo Duca was traded by the Los Angeles Dodgers with Juan Encarnación and Guillermo Mota to the Florida Marlins for Hee-seop Choi, Brad Penny, and Bill Murphy.
- September 8, 2004: Dave Weathers was signed as a free agent with the Florida Marlins.

=== Roster ===
2004 Florida Marlins
Roster
Pitchers: 21 Josh Beckett; 49 Armando Benítez; 33 Toby Borland; 40 Nate Bump; 34 A. J. Burnett; 44 Chad Fox; 41 Franklyn Gracesqui; 39 Ben Howard; 54 Logan Kensing; 88 Billy Koch; 38 Josías Manzanillo; 59 Guillermo Mota; 20 Mike Neu; 37 Darren Oliver; 45 Carl Pavano; 31 Brad Penny; 46 Matt Perisho; 57 Tommy Phelps; 37 Rudy Seánez; 50 Aaron Small; 58 Michael Tejera; 31 Ismael Valdez; 48 Justin Wayne; 25 David Weathers; 35 Dontrelle Willis	Catchers: 17 Ramón Castro; 14 Paul Lo Duca; 52 Mike Redmond; 6 Matt Treanor; Infielders: 1 Luis Castillo; 25 Hee-Seop Choi; 16 Wil Cordero; 2 Damion Easley; 11 Álex González; 19 Mike Lowell; 12 Mike Mordecai; 29 Larry Sutton	Outfielders: 14 Josh Willingham; 3 Chris Aguila; 24 Miguel Cabrera; 18 Jeff Conine; 43 Juan Encarnación; 27 Abraham Nunez; 9 Juan Pierre; Other batters: 10 Lenny Harris	Manager: 15 Jack McKeon; Coaches: 67 Pierre Arsenault (bullpen); 47 Jeff Cox (third base); 23 Doug Davis (bench); 7 Perry Hill (first base); 28 Bill Robinson (hitting); 26 Wayne Rosenthal (pitching); 8 Tony Taylor (bullpen)

== Player stats ==
= Indicates team leader

=== Batting ===
==== Starters by position ====
Note: Pos = Position; G = Games played; AB = At bats; R = Runs; H = Hits; HR = Home runs; RBI = Runs batted in; Avg. = Batting average; SB = Stolen bases

Player	Pos	G	AB	R	H	HR	RBI	Avg.	SB
Mike Redmond	C	81	246	19	63	2	25	.256	1
Hee-seop Choi	1B	95	281	48	76	15	40	.270	1
Luis Castillo	2B	150	564	91	164	2	47	.291	21
Mike Lowell	3B	158	598	87	175	27	85	.293	5
Álex González	SS	159	561	67	130	23	79	.232	3
Jeff Conine	LF	140	521	55	146	14	83	.280	5
Juan Pierre	CF	162	678	100	221	3	49	.326	45
Miguel Cabrera	RF	160	603	101	177	33	112	.294	5

==== Other batters ====
Note: G = Games played; AB = At bats; R = Runs; H = Hits; HR = Home runs; RBI = Runs batted in; Avg. = Batting average; SB = Stolen bases

Player	G	AB	R	H	HR	RBI	Avg.	SB
Damion Easley	98	223	26	53	9	43	.238	4
Paul Lo Duca	52	186	27	48	3	31	.258	2
Juan Encarnación	49	160	21	38	3	19	.238	2
Ramón Castro	32	96	9	13	3	8	.135	0
Lenny Harris	79	95	7	20	1	17	.211	0
Mike Mordecai	69	84	7	19	1	5	.226	0
Wil Cordero	27	66	6	13	1	6	.197	1
Abraham Núñez	58	64	9	11	1	5	.172	1
Matt Treanor	29	55	7	13	0	1	.236	0
Chris Aguila	29	45	10	10	3	5	.222	0
Josh Willingham	12	25	2	5	1	1	.200	0
Larry Sutton	8	5	0	1	0	1	.200	0

=== Pitching ===
==== Starting pitchers ====
Note: G = Games pitched; IP = Innings pitched; W = Wins; L = Losses; ERA = Earned run average; SO = Strikeouts

Player	G	IP	W	L	ERA	SO
Carl Pavano	31	222.1	18	8	3.00	139
Dontrelle Willis	32	197.0	10	11	4.02	139
Josh Beckett	26	156.2	9	9	3.79	152
Brad Penny	21	131.1	8	8	3.15	105
A.J. Burnett	20	120.0	7	6	3.68	113
Ismael Valdéz	11	56.0	5	3	4.50	30
Michael Tejera	2	4.0	0	1	18.00	3

==== Other pitchers ====
Note: G = Games pitched; IP = Innings pitched; W = Wins; L = Losses; ERA = Earned run average; SO = Strikeouts

Player	G	IP	W	L	ERA	SO
Darren Oliver	18	58.2	2	3	6.44	33
Tommy Phelps	19	34.0	1	1	4.76	28
David Weathers	8	16.2	1	0	2.70	10
Logan Kensing	5	13.2	0	3	9.88	7

===== Relief pitchers =====
Note: G = Games pitched; W = Wins; L = Losses; SV = Saves; ERA = Earned run average; SO = Strikeouts

Player	G	W	L	SV	ERA	SO
Armando Benítez	64	2	2	47	1.29	62
Matt Perisho	66	5	3	0	4.40	42
Nate Bump	50	2	4	1	5.01	44
Ben Howard	31	1	1	0	5.50	33
Guillermo Mota	26	1	4	3	4.81	33
Josias Manzanillo	26	3	3	1	6.12	27
Billy Koch	23	1	2	0	3.51	25
Rudy Seánez	23	3	1	0	2.74	25
Justin Wayne	19	3	3	0	5.79	20
Toby Borland	18	1	1	0	5.40	18
Chad Fox	12	0	1	0	6.75	17
Aaron Small	7	0	0	0	8.27	8
Franklyn Gracesqui	7	0	1	1	11.25	1
Mike Neu	1	0	0	0	4.50	2

== Farm system ==
Level	Team	League	Manager
AAA	Albuquerque Isotopes	Pacific Coast League	Tracy Woodson
AA	Carolina Mudcats	Southern League	Ron Hassey
A	Jupiter Hammerheads	Florida State League	Luis Dorante
A	Greensboro Bats	South Atlantic League	Steve Phillips
A-Short Season	Jamestown Jammers	New York–Penn League	Benny Castillo
Rookie	GCL Marlins	Gulf Coast League	Tim Cossins
