= Chris Sáenz =

American baseball player (born 1981)

- Pitcher
- Born: August 14, 1981 (age 44); Tucson, Arizona, U.S.
- Batted: Right Threw: Right

MLB debut
- April 24, 2004, for the Milwaukee Brewers

Last MLB appearance
- April 24, 2004, for the Milwaukee Brewers

MLB statistics
- Win–loss record: 1–0
- Earned run average: 0.00
- Strikeouts: 7
- Stats at Baseball Reference

Teams
- Milwaukee Brewers (2004)

Christopher Andrew Sáenz (born August 14, 1981) is an American former professional baseball pitcher. Sáenz appeared in one Major League Baseball game with the Milwaukee Brewers in 2004.

Sáenz was drafted by the Milwaukee Brewers in the 28th round of the 2001 Major League Baseball draft. From 2001 to 2002, he pitched mostly in relief, but became a starting pitcher in 2003. He began 2004 in Double-A with Huntsville and went 5–5 with a 4.13 ERA and 84 strikeouts in 85 innings pitched. He was called up to make a spot start on April 24 and got the win after pitching six scoreless innings. He was sent back to Double-A after this start where he spent the rest of the season.

Sáenz was granted free agency at the end of the season and re-signed with the Brewers in January 2005, but missed all of the 2005 and 2006 seasons after undergoing elbow surgery.

In 2007, Sáenz signed with the Los Angeles Angels of Anaheim and was assigned to the Double-A Arkansas Travelers. However, he struggled with his control, walking 31 in 46 innings, and was released. He signed with the independent Reno Silver Sox of the Golden Baseball League, but did not fare any better. He went 0–4 and had an 8.10 ERA in five games. In 2008, he signed with the Schaumburg Flyers of the Northern League, but had an 8.42 ERA in 19 games, all in relief.

He is only the fourth pitcher (and the first since 1899) to start in his only major league game, give up no runs (earned or unearned) with at least six innings pitched, and record the win; his Game Score was 72, the highest ever for a pitcher with only one lifetime start.
