= 2004 San Francisco Giants season =

2004 San Francisco Giants
- League: National League
- Division: West
- Ballpark: SBC Park
- City: San Francisco
- Record: 91–71 (.562)
- Divisional place: 2nd
- Owners: Peter Magowan
- General managers: Brian Sabean
- Managers: Felipe Alou
- Television: KTVU (Jon Miller, Greg Papa, Mike Krukow); Fox Sports Net Bay Area (Mike Krukow, Duane Kuiper)
- Radio: KNBR (Greg Papa, Dave Flemming, Jon Miller); KZSF (Erwin Higueros, Amaury Pi-Gonzalez)

The 2004 San Francisco Giants season was the Giants' 122nd year in Major League Baseball, their 47th year in San Francisco since their move from New York following the 1957 season, and their fifth at SBC Park. The team finished in second place in the National League West with a 91–71 record, 2 games behind the Los Angeles Dodgers. Barry Bonds became the oldest player in the history of the National League to win the MVP Award. It would be the last winning season San Francisco would have until 2009. The Giants hit 314 doubles, the most in franchise history.

== Offseason and spring training ==
On November 14, 2003, A. J. Pierzynski was traded by the Minnesota Twins with cash to the San Francisco Giants for Joe Nathan, Francisco Liriano, and Boof Bonser.

The Giants finished spring training with a record of 11–19, the worst in the Cactus League. This includes split-squad games but excludes any ties or games against non-Major League opponents.

== Regular season ==
=== Season standings ===
==== National League West ====
NL West
Team	W	L	Pct.	GB	Home	Road
Los Angeles Dodgers	93	69	.574	—	49‍–‍32	44‍–‍37
San Francisco Giants	91	71	.562	2	47‍–‍35	44‍–‍36
San Diego Padres	87	75	.537	6	42‍–‍39	45‍–‍36
Colorado Rockies	68	94	.420	25	38‍–‍43	30‍–‍51
Arizona Diamondbacks	51	111	.315	42	29‍–‍52	22‍–‍59

==== Record vs. opponents ====
2004 National League record Source: MLB Standings Grid – 2004
Team	AZ	ATL	CHC	CIN	COL	FLA	HOU	LAD	MIL	MON	NYM	PHI	PIT	SD	SF	STL	AL
Arizona	—	2–4	4–2	3–3	6–13	3–4	2–4	3–16	3–3	0–6	3–4	1–5	2–4	7–12	5–14	1–5	6–12
Atlanta	4–2	—	3–3	2–4	4–2	14–5	3–3	4–3	4–2	15–4	12–7	10–9	4–2	3–3	4–3	2–4	8–10
Chicago	2–4	3–3	—	9–8	5–1	3–3	10–9	2–4	10–7	3–3	4–2	3–3	13–5	4–2	2–4	8–11	8–4
Cincinnati	3–3	4–2	8–9	—	3–3	4–2	6–11	4–2	10–8	4–2	3–3	3–3	9–10	2–4	3–3	5–14	5-7
Colorado	13–6	2–4	1–5	3–3	—	1–5	1–5	8–11	2–4	2–4	1–5	5–3	2–4	10–9	8–11	1–5	8–10
Florida	4–3	5–14	3–3	2–4	5–1	—	3–3	3–3	4–2	11–8	15–4	12–7	1–5	4–2	2–5	2–4	7–11
Houston	4–2	3–3	9–10	11–6	5–1	3-3	—	1–5	13–6	2–4	2–4	6–0	12–5	2–4	2–4	10–8	7–5
Los Angeles	16–3	3–4	4–2	2–4	11–8	3–3	5–1	—	3–3	4–3	3–3	1–5	6–0	10–9	10–9	2–4	10–8
Milwaukee	3–3	2–4	7–10	8–10	4–2	2–4	6–13	3–3	—	5–1	2–4	0–6	6–12	2–4	1–5	8–9	8–4
Montreal	6–0	4–15	3–3	2–4	4–2	8-11	4–2	3–4	1–5	—	9–10	7–12	4–2	1–6	1–5	3–3	7–11
New York	4–3	7–12	2–4	3–3	5–1	4–15	4–2	3–3	4–2	10–9	—	8–11	1–5	1–6	4–2	1–5	10–8
Philadelphia	5-1	9–10	3–3	3–3	3–5	7–12	0–6	5–1	6–0	12–7	11–8	—	3–3	5–1	2–4	3–3	9–9
Pittsburgh	4–2	2–4	5–13	10–9	4–2	5–1	5–12	0–6	12–6	2–4	5–1	3–3	—	3–3	5–1	5–12	2–10
San Diego	12–7	3–3	2–4	4–2	9–10	2–4	4–2	9–10	4–2	6–1	6–1	1–5	3–3	—	12–7	2–4	8–10
San Francisco	14–5	3–4	4–2	3–3	11–8	5–2	4–2	9–10	5–1	5–1	2–4	4–2	1–5	7–12	—	3–3	11–7
St. Louis	5–1	4–2	11–8	14–5	5–1	4-2	8–10	4–2	9–8	3–3	5–1	3–3	12–5	4–2	3–3	—	11–1

=== Notable transactions ===
- July 30, 2004: Ricky Ledée was traded by the Philadelphia Phillies with Alfredo Simón (minors) to the San Francisco Giants for Felix Rodriguez.

=== Roster ===
2004 San Francisco Giants
Roster
Pitchers: 33,47 David Aardsma; 38 Jim Brower; 43 Dave Burba; 40 Jason Christiansen; 37 Brian Cooper; 53 Kevin Correia; 53 Leo Estrella; 49 Scott Eyre; 34 Jesse Foppert; 28 Wayne Franklin; 41 Brad Hennessey; 48 Matt Herges; 32 Dustin Hermanson; 51 Noah Lowry; 47 Félix Rodríguez; 46 Kirk Rueter; 29 Jason Schmidt; 50 Brett Tomko; 37 Merkin Valdez; 54 Kevin Walker; 45 Tyler Walker; 57 Jerome Williams	Catchers: 52 Justin Knoedler; 36 A. J. Pierzynski; 8 Yorvit Torrealba; Infielders: 13 Edgardo Alfonzo; 35 Deivi Cruz; 60,14 Brian Dallimore; 5 Ray Durham; 7 Pedro Feliz; 1 Damon Minor; 10 Neifi Pérez; 2 Cody Ransom; 6 J. T. Snow	Outfielders: 25 Barry Bonds; 56 Jason Ellison; 9 Marquis Grissom; 12 Jeffrey Hammonds; 33 Ricky Ledée; 39 Todd Linden; 22 Dustan Mohr; 20 Michael Tucker; Other batters: 21 Tony Torcato	Manager: 23 Felipe Alou; Coaches: 26 Mark Gardner (bullpen); 15 Gene Glynn (third base); 18 Joe Lefebvre (hitting); 55 Luis Pujols (first base); 19 Dave Righetti (pitching); 16 Ron Wotus (bench)

== Player stats ==
=== Batting ===
Note: Pos = Position; G = Games played; AB = At bats; H = Hits; Avg. = Batting average; HR = Home runs; RBI = Runs batted in

Pos	Player	G	AB	H	Avg.	HR	RBI
C	A. J. Pierzynski	131	471	128	.272	11	77
1B	J. T. Snow	107	346	113	.327	12	60
2B	Ray Durham	120	471	133	.282	17	65
SS	Deivi Cruz	127	397	116	.292	7	55
3B	Edgardo Alfonzo	139	519	150	.289	11	77
LF	Barry Bonds	147	373	135	.362	45	101
CF	Marquis Grissom	145	562	157	.279	22	90
RF	Michael Tucker	140	464	119	.256	13	62

==== Other batters ====
Note: G = Games played; AB = At bats; H = Hits; Avg. = Batting average; HR = Home runs; RBI = Runs batted in

Player	G	AB	H	Avg.	HR	RBI
Pedro Feliz	144	503	139	.276	22	84
Neifi Pérez	103	319	74	.232	2	33
Dustan Mohr	117	263	72	.274	7	28
Yorvit Torrealba	64	172	39	.227	6	23
Jeffrey Hammonds	40	95	20	.211	3	6
Cody Ransom	78	68	17	.250	1	11
Damon Minor	24	58	14	.241	0	6
Ricky Ledée	31	53	6	.113	0	4
Brian Dallimore	20	43	12	.279	1	7
Todd Linden	16	32	5	.156	0	1
Tony Torcato	13	9	5	.556	0	2
Jason Ellison	13	4	2	.500	1	3
Justin Knoedler	1	1	0	.000	0	0

=== Starting pitchers ===
Note: G = Games pitched; IP = Innings pitched; W = Wins; L = Losses; ERA = Earned run average; SO = Strikeouts

Player	G	IP	W	L	ERA	SO
Jason Schmidt	32	225.0	18	7	3.20	251
Brett Tomko	32	194.0	11	7	4.04	108
Kirk Rueter	33	190.1	9	12	4.73	56
Jerome Williams	22	129.1	10	7	4.24	80
Noah Lowry	16	92.0	6	0	3.82	72
Brad Hennessey	7	34.1	2	2	4.98	25

==== Other pitchers ====
Note: G = Games pitched; IP = Innings pitched; W = Wins; L = Losses; ERA = Earned run average; SO = Strikeouts

Player	G	IP	W	L	ERA	SO
Dustin Hermanson	47	131.0	6	9	4.53	102
Brian Cooper	5	13.1	0	2	8.78	7

===== Relief pitchers =====
Note: G = Games pitched; W = Wins; L = Losses; SV = Saves; ERA = Earned run average; SO = Strikeouts

Player	G	W	L	SV	ERA	SO
Matt Herges	70	4	5	23	5.23	39
Jim Brower	89	7	7	1	3.29	63
Scott Eyre	83	2	2	1	4.10	49
Jason Christiansen	60	4	3	3	4.50	22
Félix Rodríguez	53	3	5	0	3.43	31
Tyler Walker	52	5	1	1	4.24	48
Wayne Franklin	43	2	1	0	6.39	40
Kevin Correia	12	0	1	0	8.05	14
David Aardsma	11	1	0	0	6.75	5
Dave Burba	6	1	0	0	5.68	3
Kevin Walker	5	0	0	0	16.20	1
Merkin Valdez	2	0	0	0	27.00	2
Leo Estrella	2	0	0	0	27.00	0
Jesse Foppert	1	0	0	0	0.00	2

== Awards and honors ==
- Barry Bonds, Seventh National League MVP Award (Bonds became the first player to win seven MVP awards)
- Barry Bonds, Major League record, Highest On-Base Percentage in one season, (.609)
- J. T. Snow 1B, Willie Mac Award

All-Star Game

- Barry Bonds
- Jason Schmidt

== Farm system ==
Level	Team	League	Manager
AAA	Fresno Grizzlies	Pacific Coast League	Fred Stanley
AA	Norwich Navigators	Eastern League	Shane Turner
A	San Jose Giants	California League	Lenn Sakata
A	Hagerstown Suns	South Atlantic League	Mike Ramsey
A-Short Season	Salem-Keizer Volcanoes	Northwest League	Joe Strain
Rookie	AZL Giants	Arizona League	Bert Hunter

LEAGUE CHAMPIONS: AZL Giants
