= Dave Littlefield =

American baseball executive (born 1960)

- Born: June 16, 1960 (age 66); Portland, Maine, U.S.
- Occupation: Baseball executive

David Michael Littlefield (born June 16, 1960) is an American former Major League Baseball executive, who is currently a scout for the Detroit Tigers. Previously, Littlefield was employed as senior vice president and general manager of the Pittsburgh Pirates, a position he held from July 13, 2001, to September 7, 2007. He took over as GM for Roy Smith, who had assumed the position on a temporary basis after the firing of GM Cam Bonifay on June 11.

== Early years ==
Littlefield was an undrafted catcher who played in the minor league systems of the Phillies and Yankees before accepting a football scholarship to UMass in 1981, where he played as a linebacker. His football career abruptly ended with a knee injury, and Littlefield volunteered to help coach the university's baseball team. For the next three years he was an assistant coach for both UMass and the Orleans Cardinals of the Cape Cod Baseball League.

After three seasons as an assistant coach at Clemson, Littlefield was hired as a scout by the Detroit Tigers in 1989. He would go on to work in the front office of the Montreal Expos before becoming the assistant general manager to Dave Dombrowski of the Florida Marlins.

== Pittsburgh Pirates ==
Littlefield was hired mid-season as the general manager of the Pittsburgh Pirates a month after the firing of Cam Bonifay. He took over on July 13, 2001, after that season's MLB draft and barely two weeks before the trade deadline.

While his tenure with Pittsburgh has been widely criticized, it is worth noting that 6 years after Littlefield's departure, when the Pirates began a streak of three straight playoff seasons starting in 2013, those teams were built around players he acquired. League MVP Andrew McCutchen, Neil Walker, Starling Marte and All-Star relief pitcher Tony Watson were all drafted or signed as amateur free agents by Littlefield.

=== 2003 Rule 5 draft ===
Littlefield received a large amount of negative publicity after the Pirates lost five prospects from their minor league system with the first six picks in the 2003 Rule 5 draft, even though they had unused spots on their 40-man roster and could have protected some of the players if they had chosen to do so. Chris Shelton, who had recently been honored as the team's minor league player of the year, went with the first pick, and he was followed in short order by Rich Thompson, Frank Brooks, Jeff Bennett, and José Bautista. The Cincinnati Reds, picking seventh, had all five Pirate players listed on their draft board and were frustrated to see them all go too soon, and an anonymous executive from another American League team said that his team had also planned to take a Pirate prospect, refraining only because in his words, "There wasn't anything left."

=== Trading record ===
Littlefield had a reputation throughout MLB as a difficult trading partner, in that his demands during negotiations were often seen as grossly excessive. While small market teams thrive on trading established veterans for packages of talented minor leaguers, Littlefield repeatedly asked for lower-ceiling "Major League ready" prospects in return. As a result, the Pirates often had a plethora of mid-to-late 20s, borderline Major Leaguers, and very few young, impact prospects within the system. This strategy runs contrary to that of successful low-payroll teams like the A's, Twins, and Marlins. While avoiding minor league prospects from other teams, he would often trade away his own - many of whom would go on to thrive elsewhere - for veterans who were near the end of their careers, or were soon released.

This strategy had varying results. His first trade, for example, sent pitcher Jason Schmidt and veteran outfielder John Vander Wal to the San Francisco Giants for Ryan Vogelsong and Armando Rios. While Schmidt had never come close to reaching his full potential with the Pirates, he became one of the most dominant pitchers in the majors with San Francisco. Rios, meanwhile, would be out of the league two years later and Vogelsong spent several years pitching in Japan before a late career resurgence. Leading into the 2003 season, Littlefield traded future All-Star pitcher Chris Young to the Expos for reliever Matt Herges, then released Herges during spring training. 21-year-old Leo Núñez was traded to Kansas City in December 2004 for 39-year-old catcher Benito Santiago. Núñez (later known as Juan Oviedo) pitched eight seasons in the major leagues and saved 93 games, while Santiago had 6 hits with the Pirates before being released one month into the 2005 season. Conversely, it was rumored that he turned down a 2004 trade offer from the Philadelphia Phillies in which the Pirates would swap pitcher Kris Benson for rookie first baseman Ryan Howard. Instead, Littlefield would trade Benson to the New York Mets for Ty Wigginton. Wigginton was released after just a year and a half with the Pirates, while Howard would go on to be a future league MVP and three time All-Star.

Some of his trades paid dividends. In 2002, Littlefield traded veteran pitcher Todd Ritchie to the Chicago White Sox for three pitchers, including Kip Wells and Josh Fogg, who would each have lengthy careers and help solidify Pittsburgh's rotation. In 2003, Littlefield made a pair of his best trades. He sent pitchers Jeff Suppan and Scott Sauerbeck to Boston for future All-Star infielder Freddy Sanchez. He also approached the San Diego Padres with a trade proposal in which the Pirates would receive Xavier Nady, Óliver Pérez, and minor league pitcher Cory Stewart in exchange for star outfielder Brian Giles. The Padres refused to surrender Nady, so Littlefield accepted Jason Bay instead. Perez would have a dominant 2004 season in which he recorded a 2.98 ERA with 239 strikeouts, and Bay immediately emerged as a star, winning the National League Rookie of the Year award, while Nady spent the next three seasons as a part-time player with the Padres and the New York Mets. Two years later with Perez now struggling and inconsistent, Littlefield was successful in trading for Nady in a deal for Perez and veteran reliever Roberto Hernández, as well as the compensatory draft pick the Mets received when Hernández left as a free agent that offseason. Nady would have the most success of his career with the Pirates, compiling a .301 batting average and .835 OPS.

On July 31, 2007, Littlefield traded outfielder Rajai Davis to the San Francisco Giants for pitcher Matt Morris. The move was widely criticized, as Morris, who was 7–7 with a 4.35 ERA at the time of the trade, was slated to make $9.5 million in 2008. Many were surprised that the Pirates would take on such a large contract (especially without having the Giants pick up part of it), as their 2007 Opening Day payroll was just $38.5 million. At the time of the trade, the Pirates were 42–62, 14.5 games out of first place.

Littlefield's Pirates teams were largely made up of players brought in through trades, rather than raised through their farm system. Jason Bay, Freddy Sanchez, Adam LaRoche, José Bautista, and Xavier Nady and others were all acquired through trades. In his final season as GM, only one of the seven players with over 400 at-bats on the team, Ronny Paulino, was not acquired through a trade.

=== Aramis Ramirez trade ===
On July 23, 2003 the Pirates traded outfielder Kenny Lofton and young third baseman Aramis Ramirez to the division rival Chicago Cubs for aging utility player Jose Hernandez, minor league pitcher Matt Bruback, and a player to be named later who ended up being utility player Bobby Hill. The trade came as a shock among local fans and was ridiculed nationally. Ramirez had been seen as a franchise building block, and none of the players the Pirates received lasted more than two seasons with the club. Littlefield himself struggled to explain the trade, saying "It's obviously a tough one ... these (Ramirez) are the kinds of guys we need to get." Though the reasons for the trade were never revealed, sources claim that MLB forced the Pirates into compliance with the league's debt/equity ratio because then-owner Kevin McClatchy had mismanaged the franchise financially and needed to cut expenses quickly. The franchise was dealing with debt from the recent construction of PNC Park and indeed the team's payroll would be nearly cut in half, from $62 million in 2003 to $32 million in 2004.

=== Drafting players ===
During Littlefield's tenure, the Pirates were widely criticized for taking players that were perceived to be more signable than talented. The most notable examples of this were in 2002 and 2007. In 2002, the Pirates passed over Melvin Upton, Jr., widely regarded as the top prospect at the time, with the first overall pick—also passing over other highly touted prospects, including Prince Fielder, Zack Greinke, Khalil Greene, Scott Kazmir, Nick Swisher, Matt Cain, Cole Hamels and Jeff Francoeur—and drafted Bryan Bullington, who Littlefield said could be a "good #3 pitcher". After battling with injuries, Bullington was waived by the Pirates in 2008. In 2007, Littlefield and the Pirates passed over the top-ranked college hitting prospect, Matt Wieters, and instead drafted pitcher Daniel Moskos. Moskos had an inconsistent career in the minors (only playing in the MLB for the 2011 season), while Wieters was a four-time All-Star and two-time Gold Glove Award winner who would play in the MLB for 12 seasons. Littlefield's more successful first round draft picks were Paul Maholm (2003), Neil Walker (2004), Andrew McCutchen (2005), and Brad Lincoln (2006). Lincoln was drafted two picks before now superstar pitcher Clayton Kershaw was drafted by Los Angeles

=== Latin America ===
Under Littlefield's direction, the Pirates were less aggressive than other teams in signing players from Latin America. While other teams recognized the benefits of signing such talent, the Pirates did not extend a signing bonus of more than $85,000 to a Latin American prospect under Littlefield. At the end of his tenure, the team's only Latin American impact prospect in their minor league system was Starling Marte, and those on the major league roster were regarded by many as marginal talents, mostly acquired before Littlefield: José Bautista, Ronny Paulino, Jose Castillo, Salomón Torres, Dámaso Marte, and Tony Armas. The Pirates were criticized for failing to employ a Latin American scouting director until hiring Rene Gayo nearly three years after Littlefield took over as general manager. While the team's facilities were widely considered to be among the worst in baseball at the time, some (particularly beat writer Dejan Kovacevic) contend that, as much as any other decision during Littlefield's tenure, the lack of emphasis on Latin America was one of the most confounding and debilitating for the organization.

=== Firing ===
Littlefield was fired on the morning of September 7, 2007. The announcement came shortly before the Pirates could clinch their seventh consecutive losing season under his management. The Pirates never finished higher than 4th place in the NL Central. Brian Graham, the director of player development for the Pirates, served as interim general manager until new Pirates GM Neal Huntington took over September 25, 2007.

== Chicago Cubs ==
On December 19, 2007, Littlefield was named a scout for the Chicago Cubs.

== Detroit Tigers ==
On October 20, 2014, Littlefield was named a scout for the Detroit Tigers. On August 11, 2015, Littlefield was promoted to vice president of player development. He was demoted back to scout in August 2021.

Sporting positions
Preceded by Roy Smith	Pittsburgh Pirates general manager 2001–2007	Succeeded by Brian Graham
