= Frank Brooks (baseball) =

American baseball player (born 1978)

- Relief pitcher
- Born: September 6, 1978 (age 48); Brooklyn, New York, U.S.
- Batted: Left Threw: Left

MLB debut
- August 27, 2004, for the Pittsburgh Pirates

Last MLB appearance
- May 16, 2005, for the Atlanta Braves

MLB statistics
- Win–loss record: 0–1
- Earned run average: 4.58
- Strikeouts: 18
- Stats at Baseball Reference

Teams
- Pittsburgh Pirates (2004); Atlanta Braves (2005)

Frank J. Brooks (born September 6, 1978) is an American former professional baseball pitcher. He played in Major League Baseball for the Pittsburgh Pirates and the Atlanta Braves. A left-handed thrower who bats from the left side, Brooks is 6'1" tall and weighs 200 pounds.

His primary pitches are a low-90s fastball and a low-80s curveball with a large break.

== Baseball career ==
Brooks played high school baseball at Sheepshead Bay High School in Brooklyn. In a 1996 game, he threw a no-hitter with 16 strikeouts and hit a home run. After graduation, he attended Saint Peter's College, New Jersey for three years. At the end of his junior season, the Philadelphia Phillies selected him with the 396th overall pick of the 1999 June draft, as part of that draft's thirteenth round. He signed with the Phillies and began his professional career with the Batavia Muckdogs, where he was honored as a member of the New York–Penn League's All-Star team.

Brooks began his professional career as a starting pitcher, but he converted to relief partway through the 2001 season. He was dominant in Double-A in 2003, striking out 71 batters in 58 1/3 innings, while surrendering only 40 hits and five home runs. Brooks's performance caught the eye of the Pittsburgh Pirates, who acquired him in a deadline deal for closer Mike Williams. After the trade, Brooks spent time with two of the Pirates' affiliates, the Altoona Curve and the Nashville Sounds.

The New York Mets selected Brooks in the Rule 5 draft that off-season, and then immediately traded him to the Oakland Athletics. Brooks was one of five players chosen from the Pirates in the major league portion of that Rule 5 draft, a series of events that resulted in a great deal of criticism of Pirates' general manager, Dave Littlefield. Brooks failed to stick with the Athletics, but when placed on waivers on March 18, was claimed by the Boston Red Sox. Boston likewise had trouble finding space for him on their roster, and when placed on waivers again on March 31, cleared them and was sent back to the Pirates.

After spending most of 2004 at Triple-A, Brooks made his major league debut on August 27, 2004, and went on to appear in eleven games with the Pirates. He pitched well in relief, striking out 17 batters in 16 1/3 innings and surrendering only a .175 batting average to opposing hitters, but his final season totals were distorted by a poor performance in an emergency start. The Pirates placed him on waivers to clear roster space at the end of the season, and he was claimed by the Los Angeles Dodgers. Brooks went through spring training with the Dodgers, but was placed on waivers yet again on April 13, 2005, and was claimed by the Atlanta Braves.

Brooks spent the majority of the 2005 season with the Braves' Triple-A affiliate, the Richmond Braves. He did earn a brief callup to Atlanta, pitching to two batters in a game against the San Diego Padres on May 16. At the end of the year, Brooks signed with the New York Yankees as a minor league free agent. In April 2006, Brooks signed a minor league contract with the Kansas City Royals. He was released on June 12 and five days later signed with the Boston Red Sox. Brooks spent the rest of 2006 pitching for the Red Sox Double-A affiliate, the Portland Sea Dogs. On November 8, 2006, Brooks signed a minor league contract with the San Diego Padres and became a free agent after the season.

On April 14, 2008, Brooks signed with the Somerset Patriots of the Atlantic League.
