= 2004 Major League Baseball season =

2004 MLB season
- League: Major League Baseball
- Sport: Baseball
- Duration: March 30 – October 27, 2004
- Games: 162
- Teams: 30
- TV partner(s): Fox; ESPN

Draft
- Top draft pick: Matt Bush
- Picked by: San Diego Padres

Regular Season
- Season MVP: AL: Vladimir Guerrero (ANA); NL: Barry Bonds (SF)

Postseason
- AL champions: Boston Red Sox
- AL runners-up: New York Yankees
- NL champions: St. Louis Cardinals
- NL runners-up: Houston Astros

World Series
- Champions: Boston Red Sox
- Runners-up: St. Louis Cardinals
- World Series MVP: Manny Ramirez (BOS)

MLB seasons
- ← 2003 2005 →

Locations of AL teams for the 2000–2004 MLB seasons
West Central East
Locations of NL teams for the 2004 MLB season
West Central East

The 2004 Major League Baseball season ended when the Boston Red Sox defeated the St. Louis Cardinals in a four-game World Series sweep. The Red Sox championship ended an 86-year-long drought known as the Curse of the Bambino. The Red Sox were also the first team in MLB history and the third team from a major North American professional sports league ever to come back from a 3–0 postseason series deficit and win. This happened in the ALCS against the New York Yankees.

The Montreal Expos would play their last season in Montreal, before relocating to Washington DC, becoming the Washington Nationals in 2005.

== Statistical leaders ==
Statistic	American League		National League	
AVG	Ichiro Suzuki SEA	.372	Barry Bonds SF	.362
HR	Manny Ramírez BOS	43	Adrián Beltré LAD	48
RBI	Miguel Tejada BAL	150	Vinny Castilla COL	131
Wins	Curt Schilling BOS	21	Roy Oswalt HOU	20
ERA	Johan Santana MIN	2.61	Jake Peavy SD	2.27
SO	Johan Santana MIN	265	Randy Johnson AZ	290
SV	Mariano Rivera NYY	53	Armando Benítez FLA; Jason Isringhausen STL	47
SB	Carl Crawford TB	59	Scott Podsednik MIL	70

== Standings ==
=== American League ===
AL East
Team	W	L	Pct.	GB	Home	Road
^{(1)} New York Yankees	101	61	.623	—	57‍–‍24	44‍–‍37
^{(4)} Boston Red Sox	98	64	.605	3	55‍–‍26	43‍–‍38
Baltimore Orioles	78	84	.481	23	38‍–‍43	40‍–‍41
Tampa Bay Devil Rays	70	91	.435	30½	41‍–‍39	29‍–‍52
Toronto Blue Jays	67	94	.416	33½	40‍–‍41	27‍–‍53

AL Central
Team	W	L	Pct.	GB	Home	Road
^{(3)} Minnesota Twins	92	70	.568	—	49‍–‍32	43‍–‍38
Chicago White Sox	83	79	.512	9	46‍–‍35	37‍–‍44
Cleveland Indians	80	82	.494	12	44‍–‍37	36‍–‍45
Detroit Tigers	72	90	.444	20	38‍–‍43	34‍–‍47
Kansas City Royals	58	104	.358	34	33‍–‍47	25‍–‍57

AL West
Team	W	L	Pct.	GB	Home	Road
^{(2)} Anaheim Angels	92	70	.568	—	45‍–‍36	47‍–‍34
Oakland Athletics	91	71	.562	1	52‍–‍29	39‍–‍42
Texas Rangers	89	73	.549	3	51‍–‍30	38‍–‍43
Seattle Mariners	63	99	.389	29	38‍–‍44	25‍–‍55

=== National League ===
NL East
Team	W	L	Pct.	GB	Home	Road
^{(2)} Atlanta Braves	96	66	.593	—	49‍–‍32	47‍–‍34
Philadelphia Phillies	86	76	.531	10	42‍–‍39	44‍–‍37
Florida Marlins	83	79	.512	13	42‍–‍38	41‍–‍41
New York Mets	71	91	.438	25	38‍–‍43	33‍–‍48
Montreal Expos	67	95	.414	29	35‍–‍45	32‍–‍50

NL Central
Team	W	L	Pct.	GB	Home	Road
^{(1)} St. Louis Cardinals	105	57	.648	—	53‍–‍28	52‍–‍29
^{(4)} Houston Astros	92	70	.568	13	48‍–‍33	44‍–‍37
Chicago Cubs	89	73	.549	16	45‍–‍37	44‍–‍36
Cincinnati Reds	76	86	.469	29	40‍–‍41	36‍–‍45
Pittsburgh Pirates	72	89	.447	32½	39‍–‍41	33‍–‍48
Milwaukee Brewers	67	94	.416	37½	36‍–‍45	31‍–‍49

NL West
Team	W	L	Pct.	GB	Home	Road
^{(3)} Los Angeles Dodgers	93	69	.574	—	49‍–‍32	44‍–‍37
San Francisco Giants	91	71	.562	2	47‍–‍35	44‍–‍36
San Diego Padres	87	75	.537	6	42‍–‍39	45‍–‍36
Colorado Rockies	68	94	.420	25	38‍–‍43	30‍–‍51
Arizona Diamondbacks	51	111	.315	42	29‍–‍52	22‍–‍59

== Postseason ==
2004 was the last postseason until 2020 where both LCS went to 7 games.

=== Bracket ===
Division Series (ALDS, NLDS)
1	NY Yankees	3
3	Minnesota	1
American League
2	Anaheim	0
4	Boston	3
1	St. Louis	3
3	Los Angeles	1
National League
2	Atlanta	2
4	Houston	3

League Championship Series (NLCS, ALCS)
1	NY Yankees	3
4	Boston	4
1	St. Louis	4
4	Houston	3

World Series
AL4	Boston	4
NL1	St. Louis	0

Note: Two teams in the same division could not meet in the division series.

== Managers ==
=== American League ===
Team	Manager	Comments
Anaheim Angels	Mike Scioscia	
Baltimore Orioles	Lee Mazzilli	
Boston Red Sox	Terry Francona	Won the World Series
Chicago White Sox	Ozzie Guillén	
Cleveland Indians	Eric Wedge	
Detroit Tigers	Alan Trammell	
Kansas City Royals	Tony Peña	
Minnesota Twins	Ron Gardenhire	
New York Yankees	Joe Torre	
Oakland Athletics	Ken Macha	
Seattle Mariners	Bob Melvin	
Tampa Bay Devil Rays	Lou Piniella	
Texas Rangers	Buck Showalter	
Toronto Blue Jays	John Gibbons	

=== National League ===
Team	Manager	Comments
Arizona Diamondbacks	Bob Brenly	Replaced during the season by Al Pedrique
Atlanta Braves	Bobby Cox	
Chicago Cubs	Dusty Baker	
Cincinnati Reds	Dave Miley	
Colorado Rockies	Clint Hurdle	
Florida Marlins	Jack McKeon	
Houston Astros±	Jimy Williams	Replaced during the season by Phil Garner
Los Angeles Dodgers	Jim Tracy	
Milwaukee Brewers	Ned Yost	
Montreal Expos	Frank Robinson	
New York Mets	Art Howe	
Philadelphia Phillies	Larry Bowa	
Pittsburgh Pirates	Lloyd McClendon	
St. Louis Cardinals	Tony La Russa	Won the National League pennant
San Diego Padres	Bruce Bochy	
San Francisco Giants	Felipe Alou	

±hosted the MLB All Star Game

== Milestones ==
=== Batters ===
- Ken Griffey Jr. (CIN):
  - Became the 20th player in Major League history to hit 500 home runs in the sixth inning against the St. Louis Cardinals on June 20.
- Barry Bonds (SF):
  - Became the third player in Major League history to hit 700 home runs in the third inning against the San Diego Padres on September 17.
- Ichiro Suzuki (SEA):
  - Broke the Major League record for single-season hits with 262 hits, breaking George Sisler's 1920 84-year-old record of 257.

=== Pitchers ===
==== Perfect games ====
- Randy Johnson (AZ):
  - Pitched the 17th perfect game in Major League history and the first in franchise history on May 18 against the Atlanta Braves. Johnson threw 117 pitches and struck out thirteen in the 2–0 victory.

==== Other pitching accomplishments ====
- Randy Johnson (AZ):
  - Became the fourth member of the 4,000 strikeout club by striking out Jeff Cirillo of the San Diego Padres in the eighth inning on June 29.
- Greg Maddux (CHC):
  - Became the 22nd member of the 300-win club, defeating the San Francisco Giants on August 7, winning 8–4.
- Jeff Weaver (LAD):
  - Tied a Major League record by becoming the seventh pitcher to hit three consecutive batters by pitch, the first since 1999, in a game against the Atlanta Braves on August 21.

=== Miscellaneous ===
- There were a total of 80 walk-off home runs, which was then the MLB single-season record until 2018.

== Awards ==
Baseball Writers' Association of America Awards
BBWAA Award	National League	American League
Rookie of the Year	Jason Bay (PIT)	Bobby Crosby (OAK)
Cy Young Award	Roger Clemens (HOU)	Johan Santana (MIN)
Manager of the Year	Bobby Cox (ATL)	Buck Showalter (TEX)
Most Valuable Player	Barry Bonds (SF)	Vladimir Guerrero (ANA)
Gold Glove Awards
Position	National League	American League
Pitcher	Greg Maddux (CHC)	Kenny Rogers (TEX)
Catcher	Mike Matheny (STL)	Iván Rodríguez (DET)
1st Base	Todd Helton (COL)	Darin Erstad (ANA)
2nd Base	Luis Castillo (FLA)	Bret Boone (SEA)
3rd Base	Scott Rolen (STL)	Eric Chavez (OAK)
Shortstop	Cesar Izturis (LAD)	Derek Jeter (NYY)
Outfield	Andruw Jones (ATL); Jim Edmonds (STL); Steve Finley (AZ/LAD)	Torii Hunter (MIN); Ichiro Suzuki (SEA); Vernon Wells (TOR)
Silver Slugger Awards
Position	National League	American League
Pitcher/Designated Hitter	Liván Hernández (MON)	David Ortiz (BOS)
Catcher	Johnny Estrada (ATL)	Víctor Martínez (CLE); Iván Rodríguez (DET)
1st Base	Albert Pujols (STL)	Mark Teixeira (TEX)
2nd Base	Mark Loretta (SD)	Alfonso Soriano (TEX)
3rd Base	Adrián Beltré (LAD)	Melvin Mora (BAL)
Shortstop	Jack Wilson (PIT)	Miguel Tejada (BAL)
Outfield	Bobby Abreu (PHI); Barry Bonds (SF); Jim Edmonds (STL)	Vladimir Guerrero (ANA); Manny Ramirez (BOS); Gary Sheffield (NYY)

=== Other awards ===
- Edgar Martínez Award (Best designated hitter): David Ortiz (BOS)
- Hank Aaron Award: Manny Ramirez (BOS, American); Barry Bonds (SF, National).
- Roberto Clemente Award (Humanitarian): Edgar Martínez (SEA).
- Rolaids Relief Man Award: Mariano Rivera (NYY, American); Éric Gagné (LAD, National).
- Warren Spahn Award (Best left-handed pitcher): Johan Santana (MIN)

=== Player of the Month ===
Month	American League	National League
April	Carlos Beltrán	Barry Bonds
May	Melvin Mora	Lance Berkman
June	Iván Rodríguez	Jim Thome
July	Mark Teixeira	Jim Edmonds
August	Ichiro Suzuki	Barry Bonds
September	Vladimir Guerrero	Adrián Beltré

=== Pitcher of the Month ===
Month	American League	National League
April	Kevin Brown	Roger Clemens
May	Mark Buehrle	Jason Schmidt
June	Mark Mulder	Carl Pavano
July	Johan Santana	Russ Ortiz
August	Johan Santana	Jake Peavy
September	Johan Santana	Carlos Zambrano

=== Rookie of the Month ===
Month	American League	National League
April	Gerald Laird	Khalil Greene
May	Kevin Youkilis	Terrmel Sledge
June	Bobby Crosby	Jason Bay
July	Robb Quinlan	Jason Bay
August	Frank Francisco	Khalil Greene
September	Ross Gload	Jason Bay

== Home field attendance and payroll ==
Team name	Wins	%±	Home attendance	%±	Per game	Est. payroll	%±
New York Yankees	101	0.0%	3,775,292	8.9%	46,609	$184,193,950	20.6%
Los Angeles Dodgers	93	9.4%	3,488,283	11.1%	43,065	$92,902,001	−12.3%
Anaheim Angels	92	19.5%	3,375,677	10.3%	41,675	$100,534,667	27.2%
San Francisco Giants	91	−9.0%	3,256,854	−0.2%	39,718	$82,019,166	−1.0%
Philadelphia Phillies	86	0.0%	3,250,092	43.8%	40,125	$93,219,167	31.7%
Chicago Cubs	89	1.1%	3,170,154	7.0%	38,660	$90,560,000	13.4%
Houston Astros	92	5.7%	3,087,872	25.8%	38,122	$75,397,000	6.1%
St. Louis Cardinals	105	23.5%	3,048,427	4.7%	37,635	$84,340,333	0.7%
San Diego Padres	87	35.9%	3,016,752	48.6%	37,244	$55,384,833	22.5%
Seattle Mariners	63	−32.3%	2,940,731	−10.0%	35,863	$81,515,834	−6.3%
Boston Red Sox	98	3.2%	2,837,294	4.2%	35,028	$127,298,500	27.4%
Baltimore Orioles	78	9.9%	2,744,018	11.8%	33,877	$51,623,333	−30.1%
Arizona Diamondbacks	51	−39.3%	2,519,560	−10.2%	31,106	$69,780,750	−13.5%
Texas Rangers	89	25.4%	2,513,685	20.0%	31,033	$55,050,417	−46.8%
Colorado Rockies	68	−8.1%	2,338,069	0.2%	28,865	$65,445,167	−2.6%
Atlanta Braves	96	−5.0%	2,327,565	−3.1%	28,735	$90,182,500	−15.1%
New York Mets	71	7.6%	2,318,951	8.3%	28,629	$102,035,970	−12.9%
Cincinnati Reds	76	10.1%	2,287,250	−2.9%	28,238	$46,915,250	−21.0%
Oakland Athletics	91	−5.2%	2,201,516	−0.7%	27,179	$59,425,667	18.2%
Milwaukee Brewers	67	−1.5%	2,062,382	21.3%	25,462	$27,528,500	−32.2%
Chicago White Sox	83	−3.5%	1,930,537	−0.5%	23,834	$65,212,500	27.8%
Detroit Tigers	72	67.4%	1,917,004	40.1%	23,667	$46,832,000	−4.8%
Minnesota Twins	92	2.2%	1,911,490	−1.8%	23,599	$53,890,000	−2.9%
Toronto Blue Jays	67	−22.1%	1,900,041	5.6%	23,457	$50,017,000	−2.4%
Cleveland Indians	80	17.6%	1,814,401	4.9%	22,400	$34,319,300	−29.4%
Florida Marlins	83	−8.8%	1,723,105	32.2%	21,539	$42,143,042	−14.8%
Kansas City Royals	58	−30.1%	1,661,478	−6.7%	20,768	$47,609,000	17.5%
Pittsburgh Pirates	72	−4.0%	1,580,031	−3.5%	19,750	$32,227,929	−41.2%
Tampa Bay Devil Rays	70	11.1%	1,274,911	20.4%	15,936	$29,856,667	52.1%
Montreal Expos	67	−19.3%	749,550	−26.9%	9,369	$41,197,500	−20.7%

== Television coverage ==
This was the fourth season that national television coverage was split between ESPN and Fox Sports. ESPN and ESPN2 aired selected weeknight and Sunday night games, and selected Division Series playoff games. Fox televised Saturday baseball, the All-Star Game, selected Division Series games, both League Championship Series, and the World Series.

== See also ==
- 2004 Nippon Professional Baseball season
