= 2004 New York Mets season =

2004 New York Mets
- League: National League
- Division: East
- Ballpark: Shea Stadium
- City: New York
- Record: 71–91 (.438)
- Divisional place: 4th
- Owners: Fred Wilpon
- General manager: Jim Duquette
- Manager: Art Howe
- Television: WPIX (Tom Seaver, Dave O'Brien); Fox Sports New York/MSG/MetroTV (Ralph Kiner, Fran Healy, Matt Loughlin, Ted Robinson, Keith Hernandez)
- Radio: WFAN (Howie Rose, Gary Cohen); WADO (Spanish) (Juan Alicea, Billy Berroa)

The 2004 New York Mets season was the 43rd regular season for the Mets. They went 71–91 and finished fourth in the National League East, twenty-four games behind the first place Atlanta Braves. The Mets were managed by Art Howe. They played home games at Shea Stadium.

== Offseason ==
- October 9, 2003: Marco Scutaro was selected off waivers by the Oakland Athletics from the New York Mets.
- January 16, 2004: Kenny Kelly was signed as a free agent with the New York Mets.
- January 29, 2004: Shane Spencer signed as a free agent with the New York Mets.
- February 9, 2004: Ricky Bottalico was signed as a free agent with the New York Mets.

== Regular season ==
=== Opening Day starters ===
- Mike Cameron
- Ricky Gutiérrez
- Cliff Floyd
- Mike Piazza
- Jason Phillips
- Karim García
- Tom Glavine
- Ty Wigginton
- Kaz Matsui

=== Notable transactions ===
- April 3, 2004: Kenny Kelly was released by the New York Mets.
- April 7, 2004: Ricky Bottalico was released by the New York Mets.
- April 16, 2004: Ricky Bottalico was signed as a free agent with the New York Mets.
- June 17, 2004: Dave Weathers was traded by the New York Mets with Jeremy Griffiths to the Houston Astros for Richard Hidalgo.
- July 30, 2004: Justin Huber was traded by the New York Mets to the Kansas City Royals for José Bautista.
- July 30, 2004: Scott Kazmir was traded by the New York Mets with Jose Diaz to the Tampa Bay Devil Rays for Bartolomé Fortunato and Víctor Zambrano.
- July 30, 2004: Ty Wigginton, José Bautista and Matt Peterson were traded by the New York Mets to the Pittsburgh Pirates for Kris Benson and Jeff Keppinger.
- August 6, 2004: Shane Spencer was released by the New York Mets.

=== Game log ===
Green indicates a win, pink indicates a loss, and gray indicates a postponement.

2004 Game Log
Overall: 71–91 (Home: 38–43; Away: 33–48)
April: (9–14) Home: 4–6; Away: 5–8

#	Date	Opponent	Score	Win	Loss	Save	Location	Attendance	Record	Streak
1	April 6	@ Braves	7–2	Glavine (1–0)	Ortiz (0–1)	—	Turner Field	49,460	1–0	W1
2	April 7	@ Braves	10–18	Gryboski (1–0)	Trachsel (0–1)	—	Turner Field	22,775	1–1	L1
3	April 8	@ Braves	8–10	Cunnane (1–0)	Franco (0–1)	Smoltz (1)	Turner Field	26,585	1–2	L2
4	April 9	@ Expos*	3–2 (11)	Weathers (1–0)	Ayala (0–2)	Moreno (1)	Hiram Bithorn Stadium	14,739	2–2	W1
5	April 10	@ Expos*	0–1	Patterson (1–0)	Seo (0–1)	Biddle (2)	Hiram Bithorn Stadium	11,957	2–3	L1
6	April 11	@ Expos*	4–1	Glavine (2–0)	Hernandez (0–1)	Looper (1)	Hiram Bithorn Stadium	10,623	3–3	W1
7	April 12	Braves	10–6	Trachsel (1–1)	Hampton (0–1)	Looper (2)	Shea Stadium	53,666	4–3	W2
8	April 14	Braves	1–6	Thomson (1–0)	Yates (0–1)	—	Shea Stadium	15,894	4–4	L1
9	April 15	Braves	4–0	Leiter (1–0)	Ramirez (0–1)	—	Shea Stadium	33,212	5–4	W1
10	April 16	Pirates	6–7	Wells (2–1)	Moreno (0–1)	Mesa (4)	Shea Stadium	18,554	5–5	L1
11	April 17	Pirates	1–2	Meadows (1–0)	Trachsel (1–2)	Mesa (5)	Shea Stadium	40,172	5–6	L2
12	April 18	Pirates	1–8	Benson (2–0)	Seo (0–2)	—	Shea Stadium	44,345	5–7	L3
13	April 19	Expos	4–1	Yates (1–1)	Ohka (0–3)	Looper (3)	Shea Stadium	14,002	6–7	W1
14	April 20	Expos	1–2	Day (1–1)	Weathers (1–1)	Biddle (3)	Shea Stadium	14,513	6–8	L1
15	April 21	Expos	1–2	Hernandez (1–2)	Glavine (2–1)	Biddle (4)	Shea Stadium	23,565	6–9	L2
16	April 22	Expos	3–2	Trachsel (2–2)	Bentz (2–2)	Looper (4)	Shea Stadium	15,062	7–9	W1
17	April 23	@ Cubs	1–3	Maddux (1–2)	Seo (0–3)	Borowski (3)	Wrigley Field	38,862	7–10	L1
18	April 24	@ Cubs	0–3	Wood (3–1)	Yates (1–2)	Hawkins (1)	Wrigley Field	39,043	7–11	L2
19	April 25	@ Cubs	1–4	Clement (3–1)	Leiter (1–1)	Borowski (4)	Wrigley Field	38,635	7–12	L3
20	April 27	@ Dodgers	9–5	Glavine (3–1)	Nomo (3–2)	—	Dodger Stadium	28,524	8–12	W1
21	April 28	@ Dodgers	2–3	Perez (2–1)	Trachsel (2–3)	Gagne (6)	Dodger Stadium	29,319	8–13	L1
22	April 29	@ Dodgers	6–1	Seo (1–3)	Weaver (1–3)	—	Dodger Stadium	32,067	9–13	W1
23	April 30	@ Padres	6–7	Lawrence (3–2)	Yates (1–3)	Otsuka (1)	Petco Park	41,971	9–14	L1
*Games the Montreal Expos played at Hiram Bithorn Stadium in San Juan, Puerto Rico, during the 2004 season counted as Expos home games.

May: (15–12) Home: 9–5; Away: 6–7

#	Date	Opponent	Score	Win	Loss	Save	Location	Attendance	Record	Streak
24	May 1	@ Padres	1–3	Peavy (2–1)	Franco (0–2)	Hoffman (7)	Petco Park	42,064	9–15	L2
25	May 2	@ Padres	6–2	Glavine (4–1)	Valdez (3–1)	—	Petco Park	41,965	10–15	W1
26	May 4	Giants	6–2	Trachsel (3–3)	Tomko (1–2)	—	Shea Stadium	30,532	11–15	W2
27	May 5	Giants	8–2	Weathers (2–1)	Rodriguez (1–2)	—	Shea Stadium	19,974	12–15	W3
28	May 6	Giants	2–1 (11)	Weathers (3–1)	Brower (0–2)	—	Shea Stadium	23,314	13–15	W4
29	May 7	Brewers	5–7	Davis (2–2)	Glavine (4–2)	—	Shea Stadium	27,841	13–16	L1
30	May 8	Brewers	4–6	Kinney (1–2)	Yates (1–4)	Kolb (6)	Shea Stadium	29,212	13–17	L2
31	May 9	Brewers	6–5 (11)	Wheeler (1–0)	Ford (1–1)	—	Shea Stadium	29,686	14–17	W1
32	May 10	@ Diamondbacks	8–12	Daigle (2–1)	Baldwin (0–1)	—	Bank One Ballpark	28,638	14–18	L1
33	May 11	@ Diamondbacks	5–9	Bruney (1–0)	Leiter (1–2)	—	Bank One Ballpark	34,263	14–19	L2
34	May 12	@ Diamondbacks	1–0	Glavine (5–2)	Johnson (3–4)	Looper (5)	Bank One Ballpark	27,750	15–19	W1
35	May 13	@ Diamondbacks	7–4	Seo (2–3)	Webb (2–3)	Looper (6)	Bank One Ballpark	25,573	16–19	W2
36	May 14	@ Astros	8–3	Trachsel (4–3)	Oswalt (2–2)	—	Minute Maid Park	35,849	17–19	W3
37	May 15	@ Astros	4–7	Pettitte (4–1)	Baldwin (0–2)	Dotel (7)	Minute Maid Park	42,581	17–20	L1
38	May 16	@ Astros	3–2 (13)	Wheeler (2–0)	Backe (1–1)	—	Minute Maid Park	43,247	18–20	W1
39	May 18	Cardinals	5–4	Bottalico (1–0)	Isringhausen (2–1)	—	Shea Stadium	28,880	19–20	W2
40	May 19	Cardinals	0–1	Eldred (1–0)	Stanton (0–1)	Kline (1)	Shea Stadium	20,229	19–21	L1
41	May 20	Cardinals	4–11	Marquis (3–3)	Seo (2–4)	—	Shea Stadium	21,874	19–22	L2
42	May 21	Rockies	9–7	Ginter (1–0)	Young (0–1)	—	Shea Stadium	20,148	20–22	W1
43	May 22	Rockies	5–4	Weathers (4–1)	Nunez (3–2)	Looper (7)	Shea Stadium	27,526	21–22	W2
44	May 23	Rockies	4–0	Glavine (6–2)	Estes (6–3)	—	Shea Stadium	37,486	22–22	W3
45	May 25	Phillies	5–0	Trachsel (5–3)	Milton (5–1)	—	Shea Stadium	29,385	23–22	W4
46	May 26	Phillies	4–7	Hernandez (1–1)	Franco (0–3)	Worrell (6)	Shea Stadium	20,349	23–23	L1
47	May 28	@ Marlins	1–2	Willis (5–3)	Glavine (6–3)	Benitez (19)	Pro Player Stadium	25,299	23–24	L2
48	May 29	@ Marlins	2–3 (10)	Wayne (3–1)	Looper (0–1)	—	Pro Player Stadium	31,325	23–25	L3
49	May 30	@ Marlins	6–8	Borland (1–0)	Stanton (0–2)	Benitez (20)	Pro Player Stadium	30,896	23–26	L4
50	May 31	@ Phillies	5–3	Moreno (1–1)	Myers (3–3)	Looper (8)	Citizens Bank Park	43,620	24–26	W1

June: (13–13) Home: 8–5; Away: 5–8

#	Date	Opponent	Score	Win	Loss	Save	Location	Attendance	Record	Streak
51	June 1	@ Phillies	4–1	Bottalico (2–0)	Worrell (1–2)	Looper (9)	Citizens Bank Park	34,436	25–26	W2
52	June 2	@ Phillies	5–3	Weathers (5–1)	Hernandez (1–2)	Looper (10)	Citizens Bank Park	37,625	26–26	W3
53	June 3	Marlins	4–1	Seo (3–4)	Burnett (0–1)	Looper (11)	Shea Stadium	20,832	27–26	W4
54	June 4	Marlins	1–5	Pavano (5–2)	Trachsel (5–4)	Benitez (21)	Shea Stadium	23,266	27–27	L1
55	June 5	Marlins	6–7	Perisho (4–2)	Weathers (5–2)	Benitez (22)	Shea Stadium	24,803	27–28	L2
56	June 6	Marlins	5–2	Leiter (2–2)	Penny (6–3)	—	Shea Stadium	25,835	28–28	W1
57	June 8	@ Twins	1–2	Rincon (7–3)	Stanton (0–3)	—	Hubert H. Humphrey Metrodome	16,181	28–29	L1
58	June 9	@ Twins	3–5	Santana (3–4)	Trachsel (5–5)	Nathan (16)	Hubert H. Humphrey Metrodome	17,507	28–30	L2
59	June 10	@ Twins	2–3 (15)	Balfour (1–0)	Bottalico (2–1)	—	Hubert H. Humphrey Metrodome	16,706	28–31	L3
60	June 11	@ Royals	5–7	May (3–8)	Seo (3–5)	Affeldt (8)	Kauffman Stadium	23,243	28–32	L4
61	June 12	@ Royals	3–4	Affeldt (2–3)	Weathers (5–3)	—	Kauffman Stadium	23,890	28–33	L5
62	June 13	@ Royals	5–2	Glavine (7–3)	Greinke (1–2)	Looper (12)	Kauffman Stadium	24,632	29–33	W1
63	June 15	Indians	7–2	Trachsel (6–5)	Davis (1–5)	—	Shea Stadium	22,783	30–33	W2
64	June 16	Indians	1–9	Sabathia (4–3)	Ginter (1–1)	—	Shea Stadium	29,512	30–34	L1
65	June 17	Indians	6–2	Bottalico (3–1)	White (3–2)	—	Shea Stadium	17,675	31–34	W1
66	June 18	Tigers	3–2	Looper (1–1)	Patterson (0–4)	—	Shea Stadium	36,141	32–34	W2
67	June 19	Tigers	4–3 (10)	Looper (2–1)	Dingman (1–1)	—	Shea Stadium	36,925	33–34	W3
68	June 20	Tigers	6–1	Trachsel (7–5)	Bonderman (5–6)	—	Shea Stadium	39,446	34–34	W4
69	June 22	Reds	7–4	Franco (1–3)	Wilson (7–1)	Looper (13)	Shea Stadium	19,301	35–34	W5
70	June 23	Reds	4–6 (12)	Matthews (2–1)	Franco (1–4)	Graves (28)	Shea Stadium	32,423	35–35	L1
71	June 24	Reds	2–6	Lidle (5–5)	Glavine (7–4)	—	Shea Stadium	23,827	35–36	L2
–	June 25	@ Yankees	Postponed (rain); rescheduled for June 27							
72	June 26	@ Yankees	9–3	Leiter (3–2)	Halsey (1–1)	—	Yankee Stadium	55,303	36–36	W1
73	June 27 (1)	@ Yankees	1–8	Contreras (5–3)	Trachsel (7–6)	Gordon (2)	Yankee Stadium	37,305	36–37	L1
74	June 27 (2)	@ Yankees	6–11	Mussina (9–4)	Ginter (1–2)	—	Yankee Stadium	55,387	36–38	L2
75	June 29	@ Reds	7–5	Seo (4–5)	Van Poppel (3–3)	Looper (14)	Great American Ball Park	27,858	37–38	W1
76	June 30	@ Reds	0–2	Lidle (6–5)	Glavine (7–5)	Graves (30)	Great American Ball Park	42,076	37–39	L1

July: (12–15) Home: 6–7; Away: 6–8

#	Date	Opponent	Score	Win	Loss	Save	Location	Attendance	Record	Streak
77	July 1	@ Reds	7–6	Leiter (4–2)	Acevedo (4–7)	Looper (15)	Great American Ball Park	31,633	38–39	W1
78	July 2	Yankees	11–2	Trachsel (8–6)	Mussina (9–5)	—	Shea Stadium	55,068	39–39	W2
79	July 3	Yankees	10–9	Franco (2–4)	Sturtze (3–1)	—	Shea Stadium	55,120	40–39	W3
80	July 4	Yankees	6–5	Moreno (2–1)	Gordon (2–3)	Looper (16)	Shea Stadium	55,437	41–39	W4
81	July 5	@ Phillies	5–6	Madson (6–2)	Glavine (7–6)	Wagner (13)	Citizens Bank Park	41,571	41–40	L1
82	July 6	@ Phillies	4–1	Leiter (5–2)	Wolf (3–4)	Looper (17)	Citizens Bank Park	36,230	42–40	W1
83	July 7	@ Phillies	10–1	Trachsel (9–6)	Myers (5–6)	—	Citizens Bank Park	37,687	43–40	W2
84	July 8	@ Phillies	4–5	Wagner (2–0)	Franco (2–5)	—	Citizens Bank Park	42,601	43–41	L1
85	July 9	@ Marlins	6–3	Wheeler (3–0)	Manzanillo (1–2)	Looper (18)	Pro Player Stadium	25,117	44–41	W1
86	July 10	@ Marlins	2–5	Penny (8–7)	Glavine (7–7)	Benitez (29)	Pro Player Stadium	41,212	44–42	L1
87	July 11	@ Marlins	2–5	Willis (7–5)	Leiter (5–3)	Benitez (30)	Pro Player Stadium	25,735	44–43	L2
75th All-Star Game in Houston, Texas
88	July 15	Phillies	3–2 (11)	Parra (1–0)	Hernandez (1–3)	—	Shea Stadium	36,803	45–43	W1
89	July 16	Phillies	1–5	Millwood (7–5)	Seo (4–6)	Wagner (14)	Shea Stadium	42,584	45–44	L1
90	July 17	Phillies	2–8	Wolf (4–5)	Glavine (7–8)	—	Shea Stadium	35,425	45–45	L2
91	July 18	Phillies	6–1	Leiter (6–3)	Myers (5–7)	Looper (19)	Shea Stadium	30,443	46–45	W1
92	July 19	Marlins	5–6	Manzanillo (2–2)	Looper (2–2)	Benitez (31)	Shea Stadium	23,176	46–46	L1
93	July 20	Marlins	7–9	Howard (1–1)	Franco (2–6)	Benitez (32)	Shea Stadium	25,295	46–47	L2
94	July 21	Expos	5–4	Moreno (3–1)	Horgan (3–1)	Looper (20)	Shea Stadium	30,227	47–47	W1
95	July 22	Expos	1–4	Ayala (2–6)	Franco (2–7)	Cordero (8)	Shea Stadium	27,637	47–48	L1
–	July 23	Braves	Postponed (rain); rescheduled for September 13							
96	July 24	Braves	2–5	Thomson (8–7)	Stanton (0–4)	Smoltz (19)	Shea Stadium	33,166	47–49	L2
97	July 25	Braves	3–4	Hampton (6–8)	Trachsel (9–7)	Smoltz (20)	Shea Stadium	32,542	47–50	L3
98	July 26	@ Expos	10–19	Ayala (3–6)	Erickson (0–1)	—	Olympic Stadium	6,643	47–51	L4
99	July 27	@ Expos	4–2	Glavine (8–8)	Day (5–10)	Looper (21)	Olympic Stadium	7,147	48–51	W1
100	July 28	@ Expos	4–7	Tucker (1–1)	Seo (4–7)	Cordero (10)	Olympic Stadium	6,852	48–52	L1
101	July 29	@ Expos	10–1	Leiter (7–3)	Biddle (2–5)	—	Olympic Stadium	20,042	49–52	W1
102	July 30	@ Braves	1–3	Hampton (7–8)	Trachsel (9–8)	Smoltz (24)	Turner Field	40,913	49–53	L1
103	July 31	@ Braves	0–8	Wright (9–5)	Benson (8–9)	—	Turner Field	51,125	49–54	L2

August: (11–17) Home: 5–10; Away: 6–7

#	Date	Opponent	Score	Win	Loss	Save	Location	Attendance	Record	Streak
104	August 1	@ Braves	5–6	Byrd (3–3)	Glavine (8–9)	Smoltz (25)	Turner Field	34,203	49–55	L3
105	August 3	@ Brewers	12–3	Leiter (8–3)	Capuano (5–6)	—	Miller Park	22,306	50–55	W1
106	August 4	@ Brewers	6–5	Feliciano (1–0)	Adams (1–1)	Looper (22)	Miller Park	18,196	51–55	W2
107	August 5	@ Brewers	11–6	Zambrano (10–7)	Santos (9–7)	—	Miller Park	32,225	52–55	W3
108	August 6	@ Cardinals	4–6	Morris (12–7)	Glavine (8–10)	Isringhausen (29)	Busch Stadium	43,949	52–56	L1
109	August 7	@ Cardinals	1–2	Tavarez (4–3)	Stanton (0–5)	—	Busch Stadium	45,364	52–57	L2
110	August 8	@ Cardinals	2–6	Marquis (12–4)	Leiter (8–4)	Tavarez (3)	Busch Stadium	43,578	52–58	L3
111	August 10	Astros	7–3	Trachsel (10–8)	Munro (2–4)	—	Shea Stadium	28,472	53–58	W1
112	August 11	Astros	4–5 (10)	Lidge (3–5)	Looper (2–3)	Bullinger (1)	Shea Stadium	32,060	53–59	L1
113	August 12	Astros	2–1	Zambrano (11–7)	Weathers (6–7)	Looper (23)	Shea Stadium	26,419	54–59	W1
114	August 13	Diamondbacks	10–6	Benson (9–9)	Fossum (2–12)	—	Shea Stadium	22,124	55–59	W2
115	August 14	Diamondbacks	4–3	Leiter (9–4)	Gonzalez (0–6)	Looper (24)	Shea Stadium	37,599	56–59	W3
116	August 15	Diamondbacks	0–2	Johnson (12–10)	Trachsel (10–9)	Aquino (4)	Shea Stadium	36,590	56–60	L1
117	August 17	@ Rockies	4–6	Jennings (11–10)	Wheeler (3–1)	Chacon (30)	Coors Field	34,387	56–61	L2
–	August 18	@ Rockies	Postponed (rain); rescheduled for August 19							
118	August 19 (1)	@ Rockies	10–3	Benson (10–9)	Estes (13–5)	—	Coors Field	30,827	57–61	W1
119	August 19 (2)	@ Rockies	4–2	Stanton (1–5)	Reed (3–3)	—	Coors Field	29,918	58–61	W2
120	August 20	@ Giants	3–7	Lowry (3–0)	Trachsel (10–10)	—	SBC Park	42,211	58–62	L1
121	August 21	@ Giants	11–9 (12)	Stanton (2–5)	Correia (0–1)	Fortunato (1)	SBC Park	42,418	59–62	W1
122	August 22	@ Giants	1–3	Rueter (7–9)	Ginter (1–3)	Hermanson (5)	SBC Park	42,359	59–63	L1
123	August 23	Padres	4–9	Peavy (10–3)	Heilman (0–1)	—	Shea Stadium	25,475	59–64	L2
124	August 24	Padres	1–3	Wells (8–7)	Benson (10–10)	Hoffman (32)	Shea Stadium	25,558	59–65	L3
125	August 25	Padres	0–4	Lawrence (13–10)	Leiter (9–5)	—	Shea Stadium	28,067	59–66	L4
126	August 26	Padres	3–10	Eaton (9–11)	Trachsel (10–11)	—	Shea Stadium	27,621	59–67	L5
127	August 27	Dodgers	9–2	Glavine (9–10)	Alvarez (7–5)	—	Shea Stadium	42,694	60–67	W1
128	August 28	Dodgers	2–4	Carrara (4–1)	Stanton (2–6)	Gagne (36)	Shea Stadium	40,660	60–68	L1
129	August 29	Dodgers	2–10	Ishii (13–6)	Benson (10–11)	—	Shea Stadium	33,582	60–69	L2
130	August 30	Marlins	4–6	Seanez (2–2)	Bell (0–1)	Benitez (39)	Shea Stadium	16,468	60–70	L3
131	August 31	Marlins	0–5	Beckett (6–8)	Trachsel (10–12)	—	Shea Stadium	17,770	60–71	L4

September: (10–18) Home: 5–8; Away: 5–10

#	Date	Opponent	Score	Win	Loss	Save	Location	Attendance	Record	Streak
132	September 1	Marlins	4–5	Valdez (12–7)	Glavine (9–11)	Benitez (40)	Shea Stadium	19,621	60–72	L5
133	September 2	Marlins	6–9	Pavano (16–5)	Seo (4–8)	—	Shea Stadium	24,937	60–73	L6
134	September 3	@ Phillies	1–8	Floyd (1–0)	Bell (0–2)	—	Citizens Bank Park	37,267	60–74	L7
135	September 4	@ Phillies	0–7	Lidle (9–12)	Leiter (9–6)	—	Citizens Bank Park	43,089	60–75	L8
136	September 5	@ Phillies	2–4	Myers (8–9)	Trachsel (10–13)	Worrell (17)	Citizens Bank Park	43,628	60–76	L9
137	September 7	@ Marlins	3–7	Burnett (6–6)	Glavine (9–12)	—	Pro Player Stadium	14,308	60–77	L10
138	September 8	@ Marlins	0–3	Beckett (7–8)	Seo (4–9)	Benitez (41)	Pro Player Stadium	14,691	60–78	L11
139	September 9	@ Marlins	4–0	Benson (11–11)	Valdez (12–8)	—	Pro Player Stadium	13,102	61–78	W1
140	September 10	Phillies	5–9	Jones (10–5)	Bottalico (3–2)	—	Shea Stadium	27,827	61–79	L1
141	September 11	Phillies	9–11 (13)	Hernandez (3–5)	Darensbourg (0–1)	Rodriguez (1)	Shea Stadium	21,718	61–80	L2
142	September 12	Phillies	2–4	Padilla (6–7)	Glavine (9–13)	Worrell (19)	Shea Stadium	23,391	61–81	L3
143	September 13 (1)	Braves	9–7	Heilman (1–1)	Wright (14–7)	—	Shea Stadium	N/A	62–81	W1
144	September 13 (2)	Braves	1–7	Byrd (7–5)	Seo (4–10)	—	Shea Stadium	21,476	62–82	L1
145	September 14	Braves	7–0	Benson (12–11)	Ortiz (14–8)	—	Shea Stadium	21,545	63–82	W1
146	September 15	Braves	0–2	Thomson (12–8)	Leiter (9–7)	Smoltz (38)	Shea Stadium	29,704	63–83	L1
147	September 16	Braves	9–4	Trachsel (11–13)	Capellan (0–1)	—	Shea Stadium	19,885	64–83	W1
–	September 17	@ Pirates	Postponed (Hurricane Ivan); rescheduled for September 19							
148	September 18	@ Pirates	8–7 (10)	Yates (2–4)	Torres (7–5)	Looper (25)	PNC Park	19,236	65–83	W2
149	September 19 (1)	@ Pirates	0–1	Vogelsong (6–12)	Heilman (1–2)	Mesa (40)	PNC Park	N/A	65–84	L1
150	September 19 (2)	@ Pirates	1–6	Williams (2–1)	Benson (12–12)	—	PNC Park	18,219	65–85	L2
151	September 21	@ Expos	1–6	Hernandez (11–14)	Leiter (9–8)	—	Olympic Stadium	3,839	65–86	L3
152	September 22	@ Expos	3–2	Fortunato (1–0)	Ayala (6–12)	Looper (26)	Olympic Stadium	3,664	66–86	W1
153	September 23	@ Expos	4–2	Glavine (10–13)	Ohka (3–6)	Looper (27)	Olympic Stadium	11,142	67–86	W2
154	September 24	Cubs	1–2 (10	Remlinger (1–1)	Looper (2–4)	Hawkins (24)	Shea Stadium	28,196	67–87	L1
155	September 25	Cubs	4–3 (11	Seo (5–10)	Mercker (3–1)	—	Shea Stadium	34,284	68–87	W1
156	September 26	Cubs	3–2	Leiter (10–8)	Wood (8–8)	Looper (28)	Shea Stadium	36,476	69–87	W2
–	September 27	@ Braves	Postponed (rain); rescheduled for September 28							
157	September 28 (1)	@ Braves	2–1	Trachsel (12–13)	Byrd (8–6)	Looper (29)	Turner Field	N/A	70–87	W3
158	September 28 (2)	@ Braves	2–5	Colon (2–1)	Glavine (10–14)	Smoltz (42)	Turner Field	35,729	70–88	L1
159	September 29	@ Braves	3–6	Ortiz (15–9)	Heilman (1–3)	Smoltz (43)	Turner Field	22,000	70–89	L2

October: (1–2) Home: 1–2; Away: 0–0

#	Date	Opponent	Score	Win	Loss	Save	Location	Attendance	Record	Streak
160	October 1	Expos	2–4	Rauch (4–1)	Feliciano (1–1)	Cordero (14)	Shea Stadium	29,273	70–90	L3
161	October 2	Expos	3–6	Cordero (7–3)	Looper (2–5)	Majewski (1)	Shea Stadium	30,147	70–91	L4
162	October 3	Expos	8–1	Glavine (11–14)	Patterson (4–7)	—	Shea Stadium	33,569	71–91	W1

== Roster ==
2004 New York Mets
Roster
Pitchers: 38 James Baldwin; 19 Heath Bell; 34 Kris Benson; 34,20 Ricky Bottalico; 39 Vic Darensbourg; 35 Mike DeJean; 19 Scott Erickson; 55 Pedro Feliciano; 43 Bartolomé Fortunato; 45 John Franco; 13 Matt Ginter; 47 Tom Glavine; 48 Aaron Heilman; 22 Al Leiter; 40 Braden Looper; 49 Orber Moreno; 46 José Parra; 36 Grant Roberts; 26 Jae Seo; 32 Mike Stanton; 29 Steve Trachsel; 35 David Weathers; 39 Dan Wheeler; 33 Tyler Yates; 38 Víctor Zambrano	Catchers: 10 Joe Hietpas; 23 Jason Phillips; 6 Tom Wilson; 3 Vance Wilson; Infielders: 9 Craig Brazell; 10 Brian Buchanan; 17 Wilson Delgado; 12 Danny Garcia; 6 Ricky Gutiérrez; 6 Jeff Keppinger; 25 Kazuo Matsui; 11 Joe McEwing; 31 Mike Piazza; 7 José Reyes; 9 Ty Wigginton; 5 David Wright; 27 Todd Zeile	Outfielders: 44 Mike Cameron; 50 Víctor Díaz; 10 Jeff Duncan; 30 Cliff Floyd; 20 Karim García; 15 Richard Hidalgo; 1 Esix Snead; 43 Shane Spencer; 57 Eric Valent; 21 Gerald Williams	Manager: 18 Art Howe; Coaches: 52 Don Baylor (bench); 53 Bobby Floyd (third base); 4 Matt Galante (infield); 51 Rick Peterson (pitching); 2 Gary Pettis (first base); 54 Rick Waits (bullpen); 15 Denny Walling (hitting)

=== Season standings ===
==== National League East ====
NL East
Team	W	L	Pct.	GB	Home	Road
Atlanta Braves	96	66	.593	—	49‍–‍32	47‍–‍34
Philadelphia Phillies	86	76	.531	10	42‍–‍39	44‍–‍37
Florida Marlins	83	79	.512	13	42‍–‍38	41‍–‍41
New York Mets	71	91	.438	25	38‍–‍43	33‍–‍48
Montreal Expos	67	95	.414	29	35‍–‍45	32‍–‍50

==== Record vs. opponents ====
2004 National League record Source: MLB Standings Grid – 2004
Team	AZ	ATL	CHC	CIN	COL	FLA	HOU	LAD	MIL	MON	NYM	PHI	PIT	SD	SF	STL	AL
Arizona	—	2–4	4–2	3–3	6–13	3–4	2–4	3–16	3–3	0–6	3–4	1–5	2–4	7–12	5–14	1–5	6–12
Atlanta	4–2	—	3–3	2–4	4–2	14–5	3–3	4–3	4–2	15–4	12–7	10–9	4–2	3–3	4–3	2–4	8–10
Chicago	2–4	3–3	—	9–8	5–1	3–3	10–9	2–4	10–7	3–3	4–2	3–3	13–5	4–2	2–4	8–11	8–4
Cincinnati	3–3	4–2	8–9	—	3–3	4–2	6–11	4–2	10–8	4–2	3–3	3–3	9–10	2–4	3–3	5–14	5-7
Colorado	13–6	2–4	1–5	3–3	—	1–5	1–5	8–11	2–4	2–4	1–5	5–3	2–4	10–9	8–11	1–5	8–10
Florida	4–3	5–14	3–3	2–4	5–1	—	3–3	3–3	4–2	11–8	15–4	12–7	1–5	4–2	2–5	2–4	7–11
Houston	4–2	3–3	9–10	11–6	5–1	3-3	—	1–5	13–6	2–4	2–4	6–0	12–5	2–4	2–4	10–8	7–5
Los Angeles	16–3	3–4	4–2	2–4	11–8	3–3	5–1	—	3–3	4–3	3–3	1–5	6–0	10–9	10–9	2–4	10–8
Milwaukee	3–3	2–4	7–10	8–10	4–2	2–4	6–13	3–3	—	5–1	2–4	0–6	6–12	2–4	1–5	8–9	8–4
Montreal	6–0	4–15	3–3	2–4	4–2	8-11	4–2	3–4	1–5	—	9–10	7–12	4–2	1–6	1–5	3–3	7–11
New York	4–3	7–12	2–4	3–3	5–1	4–15	4–2	3–3	4–2	10–9	—	8–11	1–5	1–6	4–2	1–5	10–8
Philadelphia	5-1	9–10	3–3	3–3	3–5	7–12	0–6	5–1	6–0	12–7	11–8	—	3–3	5–1	2–4	3–3	9–9
Pittsburgh	4–2	2–4	5–13	10–9	4–2	5–1	5–12	0–6	12–6	2–4	5–1	3–3	—	3–3	5–1	5–12	2–10
San Diego	12–7	3–3	2–4	4–2	9–10	2–4	4–2	9–10	4–2	6–1	6–1	1–5	3–3	—	12–7	2–4	8–10
San Francisco	14–5	3–4	4–2	3–3	11–8	5–2	4–2	9–10	5–1	5–1	2–4	4–2	1–5	7–12	—	3–3	11–7
St. Louis	5–1	4–2	11–8	14–5	5–1	4-2	8–10	4–2	9–8	3–3	5–1	3–3	12–5	4–2	3–3	—	11–1

== The final Montreal Expos game ==
Back in 1969, the New York Mets played the Montreal Expos in their first ever game. The game was played in New York. The Montreal Expos final game was played in New York against the Mets as well.

=== Scorecard ===
October 3, Shea Stadium, Flushing, New York

Team	1	2	3	4	5	6	7	8	9	R	H	E
Montreal	1	0	0	0	0	0	0	0	0	1	5	2
New York	1	0	2	0	1	3	0	1	x	8	11	1
W: Tom Glavine (11-14) L: John Patterson (4-7) HRs: David Wright (14), Todd Zeile (9)
Attendance: 33,569 Time:3:10

== Player stats ==
=== Batting ===
==== Starters by position ====
Note: Pos = Position; G = Games played; AB = At bats; H = Hits; Avg. = Batting average; HR = Home runs; RBI = Runs batted in

Pos	Player	G	AB	H	Avg.	HR	RBI
C	Jason Phillips	128	362	79	.218	7	34
1B	Mike Piazza	129	455	121	.266	20	54
2B	José Reyes	53	220	56	.255	2	14
SS	Kazuo Matsui	114	460	125	.272	7	44
3B	David Wright	69	263	77	.293	14	40
LF	Cliff Floyd	113	396	103	.260	18	63
CF	Mike Cameron	140	493	114	.231	30	76
RF	Richard Hidalgo	86	324	74	.228	21	52

==== Other batters ====
Note: G = Games played; AB = At bats; H = Hits; Avg. = Batting average; HR = Home runs; RBI = Runs batted in

Player	G	AB	H	Avg.	HR	RBI
Todd Zeile	137	348	81	.233	9	35
Ty Wigginton	86	312	89	.285	12	42
Eric Valent	130	270	72	.267	13	34
Karim Garcia	62	192	45	.234	7	22
Shane Spencer	74	185	52	.281	4	26
Vance Wilson	79	157	43	.274	4	21
Danny Garcia	58	138	32	.232	3	17
Joe McEwing	75	138	35	.254	1	16
Wilson Delgado	42	130	38	.292	2	13
Gerald Williams	57	129	30	.233	4	11
Jeff Keppinger	33	116	33	.284	3	9
Ricky Gutiérrez	24	63	11	.175	0	5
Víctor Díaz	15	51	15	.294	3	8
Craig Brazell	24	34	9	.265	1	3
Jeff Duncan	13	15	1	.067	0	1
Tom Wilson	4	4	1	.250	0	0
Brian Buchanan	2	3	0	.000	0	0
Joe Hietpas	1	0	0	----	0	0
Esix Snead	1	0	0	----	0	0

=== Pitching ===
==== Starting pitchers ====
Note: G = Games pitched; IP = Innings pitched; W = Wins; L = Losses; ERA = Earned run average; SO = Strikeouts

Player	G	IP	W	L	ERA	SO
Tom Glavine	33	212.1	11	14	3.60	109
Steve Trachsel	33	202.2	12	13	4.00	117
Al Leiter	30	173.2	10	8	3.21	117
Jae Weong Seo	24	117.2	5	10	4.90	54
Matt Ginter	15	69.1	1	3	4.54	38
Kris Benson	11	68.0	4	4	4.50	51
Aaron Heilman	5	28.0	1	3	5.46	22
Victor Zambrano	3	14.0	2	0	3.86	14
Scott Erickson	2	8.0	0	1	7.88	3
James Baldwin	2	6.0	0	2	15.00	1

==== Other pitchers ====
Note: G = Games pitched; IP = Innings pitched; W = Wins; L = Losses; ERA = Earned run average; SO = Strikeouts

Player	G	IP	W	L	ERA	SO
Tyler Yates	21	46.2	2	4	6.36	35

==== Relief pitchers ====
Note: G = Games pitched; W = Wins; L = Losses; SV = Saves; ERA = Earned run average; SO = Strikeouts

Player	G	W	L	SV	ERA	SO
Braden Looper	71	2	5	29	2.70	60
Mike Stanton	83	2	6	0	3.16	58
Ricky Bottalico	60	3	2	0	3.38	61
John Franco	52	2	7	0	5.28	36
Orber Moreno	33	3	1	1	3.38	29
Dan Wheeler	32	3	1	0	4.80	46
David Weathers	32	5	3	0	4.28	25
Pedro Feliciano	22	1	1	0	5.40	14
Heath Bell	17	0	2	0	3.33	27
Mike DeJean	17	0	0	0	1.69	24
Bartolomé Fortunato	15	1	0	1	3.86	20
José Parra	13	1	0	0	3.21	14
Vic Darensbourg	5	0	1	0	7.94	1
Grant Roberts	4	0	0	0	17.36	1
Todd Zeile	1	0	0	0	45.00	0

== Farm system ==
Level	Team	League	Manager
AAA	Norfolk Tides	International League	John Stearns
AA	Binghamton Mets	Eastern League	Ken Oberkfell
A	St. Lucie Mets	Florida State League	Tim Teufel
A	Capital City Bombers	South Atlantic League	Jack Lind
A-Short Season	Brooklyn Cyclones	New York–Penn League	Tony Tijerina
Rookie	Kingsport Mets	Appalachian League	Mookie Wilson
Rookie	GCL Mets	Gulf Coast League	Brett Butler
