= 2004 Atlanta Braves season =

2004 Atlanta Braves
- National League East Division Champion
- League: National League
- Division: East
- Ballpark: Turner Field
- City: Atlanta
- Record: 96–66 (59.3%)
- Divisional place: 1st place
- Owner: Time Warner
- General manager: John Schuerholz
- Manager: Bobby Cox
- Television: TBS Superstation; Turner South (Don Sutton, Joe Simpson, Pete Van Wieren, Skip Caray); FSN South (Tom Paciorek, Bob Rathbun)
- Radio: WSB (AM) (Pete Van Wieren, Skip Caray, Don Sutton, Joe Simpson); WWWE (Luis Octavio Dozal, Jose Manuel Flores)

The 2004 Atlanta Braves season marked the franchise's 39th season in Atlanta and 134th overall. The Braves won their tenth consecutive division title, finishing 10 games ahead of the second-place Philadelphia Phillies.

On September 29, 2004, Bobby Cox won his 2,000th game as a manager. He became the ninth manager to achieve the feat, doing so with a 6–3 win over the New York Mets at Turner Field in the final home game of the year He was named Manager of the Year after the season ended.

J. D. Drew replaced Gary Sheffield (lost to the Yankees in free agency) in the outfield, free agent John Thomson joined the rotation, and rookies Adam LaRoche and Charles Thomas saw significant playing time on a younger 2004 Braves team.

The Braves would face the Houston Astros in the NLDS (the fourth time that these two teams met in seven years, all of which were won by Atlanta), but the Braves lost three games to two.

== Offseason ==
- October 25, 2003: DeWayne Wise was signed as a free agent with the Atlanta Braves.
- November 14, 2003: Jorge Velandia was signed as a free agent with the Atlanta Braves.
- December 10, 2003: John Thomson signed as a free agent with the Atlanta Braves.
- December 13, 2003: J. D. Drew was traded by the St. Louis Cardinals with Eli Marrero to the Atlanta Braves for Jason Marquis, Ray King, and Adam Wainwright.
- December 23, 2003: Antonio Alfonseca signed as a free agent with the Atlanta Braves.
- January 12, 2004: Julio Franco was re-signed from free agency to the Atlanta Braves.
- February 5, 2004: Russell Branyan was signed as a free agent with the Atlanta Braves.
- March 26, 2004: Chris Reitsma was traded by the Cincinnati Reds to the Atlanta Braves for Bubba Nelson (minors) and Jung Bong.

== Regular season ==
=== Opening Day starters ===
Position	Name
Starting Pitcher	Russ Ortiz
Catcher	Johnny Estrada
First Baseman	Julio Franco
Second Baseman	Marcus Giles
Third Baseman	Mark DeRosa
Shortstop	Rafael Furcal
Left Fielder	Chipper Jones
Center Fielder	Andruw Jones
Right Fielder	J. D. Drew

=== Season standings ===
==== National League East ====
NL East
Team	W	L	Pct.	GB	Home	Road
Atlanta Braves	96	66	.593	—	49‍–‍32	47‍–‍34
Philadelphia Phillies	86	76	.531	10	42‍–‍39	44‍–‍37
Florida Marlins	83	79	.512	13	42‍–‍38	41‍–‍41
New York Mets	71	91	.438	25	38‍–‍43	33‍–‍48
Montreal Expos	67	95	.414	29	35‍–‍45	32‍–‍50

==== Record vs. opponents ====
2004 National League record Source: MLB Standings Grid – 2004
Team	AZ	ATL	CHC	CIN	COL	FLA	HOU	LAD	MIL	MON	NYM	PHI	PIT	SD	SF	STL	AL
Arizona	—	2–4	4–2	3–3	6–13	3–4	2–4	3–16	3–3	0–6	3–4	1–5	2–4	7–12	5–14	1–5	6–12
Atlanta	4–2	—	3–3	2–4	4–2	14–5	3–3	4–3	4–2	15–4	12–7	10–9	4–2	3–3	4–3	2–4	8–10
Chicago	2–4	3–3	—	9–8	5–1	3–3	10–9	2–4	10–7	3–3	4–2	3–3	13–5	4–2	2–4	8–11	8–4
Cincinnati	3–3	4–2	8–9	—	3–3	4–2	6–11	4–2	10–8	4–2	3–3	3–3	9–10	2–4	3–3	5–14	5-7
Colorado	13–6	2–4	1–5	3–3	—	1–5	1–5	8–11	2–4	2–4	1–5	5–3	2–4	10–9	8–11	1–5	8–10
Florida	4–3	5–14	3–3	2–4	5–1	—	3–3	3–3	4–2	11–8	15–4	12–7	1–5	4–2	2–5	2–4	7–11
Houston	4–2	3–3	9–10	11–6	5–1	3-3	—	1–5	13–6	2–4	2–4	6–0	12–5	2–4	2–4	10–8	7–5
Los Angeles	16–3	3–4	4–2	2–4	11–8	3–3	5–1	—	3–3	4–3	3–3	1–5	6–0	10–9	10–9	2–4	10–8
Milwaukee	3–3	2–4	7–10	8–10	4–2	2–4	6–13	3–3	—	5–1	2–4	0–6	6–12	2–4	1–5	8–9	8–4
Montreal	6–0	4–15	3–3	2–4	4–2	8-11	4–2	3–4	1–5	—	9–10	7–12	4–2	1–6	1–5	3–3	7–11
New York	4–3	7–12	2–4	3–3	5–1	4–15	4–2	3–3	4–2	10–9	—	8–11	1–5	1–6	4–2	1–5	10–8
Philadelphia	5-1	9–10	3–3	3–3	3–5	7–12	0–6	5–1	6–0	12–7	11–8	—	3–3	5–1	2–4	3–3	9–9
Pittsburgh	4–2	2–4	5–13	10–9	4–2	5–1	5–12	0–6	12–6	2–4	5–1	3–3	—	3–3	5–1	5–12	2–10
San Diego	12–7	3–3	2–4	4–2	9–10	2–4	4–2	9–10	4–2	6–1	6–1	1–5	3–3	—	12–7	2–4	8–10
San Francisco	14–5	3–4	4–2	3–3	11–8	5–2	4–2	9–10	5–1	5–1	2–4	4–2	1–5	7–12	—	3–3	11–7
St. Louis	5–1	4–2	11–8	14–5	5–1	4-2	8–10	4–2	9–8	3–3	5–1	3–3	12–5	4–2	3–3	—	11–1

=== Notable transactions ===
- April 25, 2004: Russell Branyan was traded by the Atlanta Braves to the Cleveland Indians for Scott Sturkie (minors).
- June 7, 2004: Clint Sammons was drafted by the Atlanta Braves in the 6th round of the 2004 amateur draft. Player signed July 12, 2004.

=== Roster ===
2004 Atlanta Braves
**Roster**
**Pitchers**: 57 Antonio Alfonseca; 34 Armando Almanza; 36 Paul Byrd; 34 José Capellán; 40 Román Colón; 51 Juan Cruz; 26 Will Cunnane; 46 Tim Drew; 49 Kevin Gryboski; 32 Mike Hampton; 38 Tom Martin; 28 Sam McConnell; 45 Dan Meyer; 40 C. J. Nitkowski; 48 Russ Ortiz; 30 Horacio Ramírez; 37 Chris Reitsma; 43 Travis Smith; 29 John Smoltz; 52 John Thomson; 27 Jaret Wright	**Catchers**: 23 Johnny Estrada; 12 Eddie Pérez; **Infielders**: 24 Wilson Betemit; 16 Mark DeRosa; 14 Julio Franco; 1 Rafael Furcal; 2 Jesse Garcia; 22 Marcus Giles; 20 Nick Green; 15 Mike Hessman; 10 Chipper Jones; 19 Adam LaRoche	**Outfielders**: 7 J. D. Drew; 20 Damon Hollins; 25 Andruw Jones; 8 Eli Marrero; 26 Charles Thomas; 11 DeWayne Wise	**Manager**: 6 Bobby Cox; **Coaches**: 39 Pat Corrales (bench); 53 Bobby Dews (bullpen); 33 Fredi González (third base); 17 Glenn Hubbard (first base); 54 Leo Mazzone (pitching); 9 Terry Pendleton (hitting)

=== Game log ===
2004 Game Log: 96–66 (Home: 49–32; Away: 47–34)
April: 11–10 (Home: 6–3; Away: 5–7)

#	Date	Opponent	Score	Win	Loss	Save	Attendance	Record
1	April 6	Mets	2–7	Glavine (1–0)	**Ortiz** (0–1)	—	49,460	0–1
2	April 7	Mets	18–10	**Gryboski** (1–0)	Trachsel (0–1)	—	22,775	1–1
3	April 8	Mets	10–8	**Cunnane** (1–0)	Franco (0–1)	**Smoltz** (1)	26,585	2–1
4	April 9	Cubs	1–2 (15)	Mercker (1–0)	**Cunnane** (1–1)	Borowski (2)	35,650	2–2
5	April 10	Cubs	5–2	**Alfonseca** (1–0)	Pratt (0–1)	**Gryboski** (1)	39,685	3–2
6	April 11	Cubs	2–10	Wood (2–0)	**Ortiz** (0–2)	—	27,701	3–3
7	April 12	@ Mets	6–10	Trachsel (1–1)	**Hampton** (0–1)	Looper (2)	53,666	3–4
8	April 14	@ Mets	6–1	**Thomson** (1–0)	Yates (0–1)	—	15,894	4–4
9	April 15	@ Mets	0–4	Leiter (1–0)	**Ramirez** (0–1)	—	33,212	4–5
10	April 16	Marlins	5–4	**Wright** (1–0)	Oliver (1–1)	**Smoltz** (2)	29,638	5–5
11	April 17	Marlins	4–1	**Ortiz** (1–2)	Beckett (1–1)	**Smoltz** (3)	31,401	6–5
12	April 18	Marlins	3–2 (10)	**Alfonseca** (2–0)	Perisho (2–1)	—	29,829	7–5
13	April 20	@ Reds	2–3	Acevedo (2–0)	**Thomson** (1–1)	Graves (7)	20,232	7–6
14	April 21	@ Reds	9–5 (10)	**Reitsma** (1–0)	Reith (0–1)	—	29,472	8–6
15	April 22	@ Reds	3–5 (5)	Lidle (2–1)	**Wright** (1–1)	—	19,909	8–7
16	April 23	@ Marlins	6–1	**Ortiz** (2–2)	Beckett (1–2)	—	32,477	9–7
17	April 24	@ Marlins	4–7	Penny (2–1)	**Hampton** (0–2)	Benítez (9)	41,226	9–8
18	April 25	@ Marlins	7–2	**Thomson** (2–1)	Bump (0–1)	—	27,977	10–8
19	April 26	@ Giants	2–3	Schmidt (1–2)	**Ramirez** (0–2)	Herges (7)	35,866	10–9
20	April 27	@ Giants	12–3	**Wright** (2–1)	Rueter (0–3)	—	36,371	11–9
21	April 28	@ Giants	7–10	Tomko (1–1)	**Ortiz** (2–3)	—	36,210	11–10
–	April 30	@ Rockies	Postponed (snow); rescheduled for May 1					

May: 14–15 (Home: 6–7; Away: 8–8)

#	Date	Opponent	Score	Win	Loss	Save	Attendance	Record
22	May 1 (1)	@ Rockies	2–3	Nunez (3–0)	**Reitsma** (1–1)	Chacon (6)	30,176	11–11
23	May 1 (2)	@ Rockies	11–7	**Nitkowski** (1–0)	Nunez (3–1)	—	24,272	12–11
24	May 2	@ Rockies	4–13	Estes (4–1)	**Ramirez** (0–3)	—	35,234	12–12
25	May 4	Padres	4–2	**Ortiz** (3–3)	Eaton (1–2)	**Smoltz** (4)	22,046	13–12
26	May 5	Padres	0–2	Wells (2–2)	**Wright** (2–2)	Hoffman (8)	21,444	13–13
27	May 6	Padres	3–7	Lawrence (4–2)	**Hampton** (0–3)	—	26,137	13–14
28	May 7	Astros	3–5	Redding (1–3)	**Thomson** (2–2)	Dotel (5)	27,902	13–15
29	May 8	Astros	5–4 (10)	**Alfonseca** (3–0)	Stone (1–1)	—	35,220	14–15
30	May 9	Astros	1–2	Pettitte (3–1)	**Ortiz** (3–4)	Dotel (6)	26,825	14–16
31	May 11	@ Cardinals	1–5	Williams (1–3)	**Wright** (2–3)	—	35,000	14–17
32	May 12	@ Cardinals	2–5	Morris (4–3)	**Hampton** (0–4)	Isringhausen (6)	28,921	14–18
33	May 13	@ Cardinals	6–5	**Alfonseca** (4–0)	Suppan (3–4)	**Smoltz** (5)	40,472	15–18
34	May 14	@ Brewers	2–0	**Ramirez** (1–3)	Vizcaino (0–2)	**Smoltz** (6)	33,061	16–18
35	May 15	@ Brewers	11–6	**Alfonseca** (5–0)	Kinney (1–3)	—	26,862	17–18
36	May 16	@ Brewers	1–4	Sheets (4–2)	**Wright** (2–4)	—	20,654	17–19
37	May 18	Diamondbacks	0–2	Johnson (4–4)	**Hampton** (0–5)	—	23,381	17–20
38	May 19	Diamondbacks	4–6 (11)	Bruney (2–0)	**Almanza** (0–1)	—	19,971	17–21
39	May 20	Diamondbacks	5–1	**Ramirez** (2–3)	Fossum (0–1)	—	21,044	18–21
40	May 21	Dodgers	2–0	**Ortiz** (4–4)	Perez (2–3)	**Smoltz** (7)	27,194	19–21
41	May 22	Dodgers	4–7	Weaver (3–5)	**Wright** (2–5)	—	31,850	19–22
42	May 23	Dodgers	5–1	**Hampton** (1–5)	Alvarez (2–1)	—	29,738	20–22
43	May 24	@ Expos	5–0	**Thomson** (3–2)	Day (3–5)	—	4,675	21–22
44	May 25	@ Expos	1–3	Ohka (2–5)	**Ramirez** (2–4)	Biddle (10)	4,235	21–23
45	May 26	@ Expos	6–1	**Ortiz** (5–4)	Hernandez (3–4)	—	4,544	22–23
46	May 27	@ Phillies	6–1	**Wright** (3–5)	Millwood (4–3)	—	38,802	23–23
47	May 28	@ Phillies	2–3 (10)	Worrell (1–1)	**Alfonseca** (5–1)	—	40,187	23–24
48	May 29	@ Phillies	9–3	**Thomson** (4–2)	Padilla (4–5)	—	44,057	24–24
49	May 30	@ Phillies	1–4	Milton (6–1)	**Smith** (0–1)	Worrell (7)	44,304	24–25
50	May 31	Expos	8–2	**Ortiz** (6–4)	Hernandez (3–5)	—	24,945	25–25

June: 12–15 (Home: 7–8; Away: 5–7)

#	Date	Opponent	Score	Win	Loss	Save	Attendance	Record
51	June 1	Expos	7–6	**Almanza** (1–1)	Biddle (0–3)	—	20,271	26–25
52	June 2	Expos	4–8	Vargas (4–3)	**Hampton** (1–6)	—	21,055	26–26
53	June 3	Phillies	8–4	**Thomson** (5–2)	Hancock (0–1)	—	23,405	27–26
54	June 4	Phillies	1–9	Milton (7–1)	**Smith** (0–2)	—	27,699	27–27
55	June 5	Phillies	3–5	Myers (4–3)	**Ortiz** (6–5)	Worrell (8)	29,252	27–28
56	June 6	Phillies	6–4	**Wright** (4–5)	Millwood (4–4)	**Smoltz** (8)	27,775	28–28
57	June 8	@ Tigers	4–3 (10)	**Reitsma** (2–1)	Patterson (0–3)	**Smoltz** (9)	19,062	29–28
58	June 9	@ Tigers	2–4	Dingman (1–0)	**Thomson** (5–3)	Urbina (8)	20,577	29–29
59	June 10	@ Tigers	4–7	Maroth (5–3)	**Alfonseca** (5–2)	Urbina (9)	21,166	29–30
60	June 11	@ White Sox	6–4	**Wright** (5–5)	Schoeneweis (5–4)	—	23,217	30–30
61	June 12	@ White Sox	8–10	Loaiza (7–3)	**Thomson** (5–4)	Takatsu (1)	34,719	30–31
62	June 13	@ White Sox	3–10	Buehrle (7–1)	**Smith** (0–3)	—	32,589	30–32
63	June 15	Royals	3–2	**Reitsma** (3–1)	Grimsley (3–3)	**Smoltz** (10)	23,350	31–32
64	June 16	Royals	4–10	Cerda (1–1)	**Reitsma** (3–2)	—	27,048	31–33
65	June 17	Royals	4–10	May (4–8)	**Thomson** (5–5)	—	28,578	31–34
66	June 18	Indians	2–4	Lee (6–1)	**Hampton** (1–7)	Jimenez (6)	28,000	31–35
67	June 19	Indians	4–0	**Byrd** (1–0)	Westbrook (6–3)	**Smoltz** (11)	41,987	32–35
68	June 20	Indians	2–5	Davis (2–5)	**Ortiz** (6–6)	Jimenez (7)	31,000	32–36
69	June 22	@ Marlins	3–4	Pavano (8–2)	**Gryboski** (1–1)	Benítez (25)	14,716	32–37
70	June 23	@ Marlins	0–6	Penny (7–5)	**Thomson** (5–6)	—	15,294	32–38
71	June 24	@ Marlins	9–4	**Hampton** (2–7)	Willis (6–5)	—	23,856	33–38
72	June 25	@ Orioles	0–5	Cabrera (4–3)	**Byrd** (1–1)	—	33,579	33–39
73	June 26	@ Orioles	5–0	**Ortiz** (7–6)	Lopez (5–4)	**Smoltz** (12)	47,438	34–39
74	June 27	@ Orioles	8–7	**Cruz** (1–0)	Grimsley (3–4)	**Smoltz** (13)	39,095	35–39
75	June 28	Marlins	6–1	**Thomson** (6–6)	Penny (7–6)	—	31,969	36–39
76	June 29	Marlins	4–5	Manzanillo (1–1)	**Hampton** (2–8)	Benítez (26)	25,105	36–40
77	June 30	Marlins	9–6	**McConnell** (1–0)	Oliver (2–3)	**Smoltz** (14)	23,040	37–40

July: 20–6 (Home: 10–4; Away: 10–2)

#	Date	Opponent	Score	Win	Loss	Save	Attendance	Record
78	July 1	Marlins	9–1	**Ortiz** (8–6)	Tejera (0–1)	—	20,600	38–40
79	July 2	Red Sox	6–3 (12)	**Cruz** (2–0)	Martinez (2–1)	—	42,231	39–40
80	July 3	Red Sox	1–6	Schilling (11–4)	**Thomson** (6–7)	—	51,831	39–41
81	July 4	Red Sox	10–4	**Hampton** (3–8)	Lowe (6–8)	—	41,414	40–41
82	July 5	@ Expos*	11–4	**Byrd** (2–1)	Day (5–9)	—	13,122	41–41
83	July 6	@ Expos*	1–0	**Ortiz** (9–6)	Downs (0–3)	**Smoltz** (15)	7,697	42–41
84	July 7	@ Expos*	14–2	**Wright** (6–5)	Hernandez (6–8)	—	8,534	43–41
85	July 9	@ Phillies	6–7 (10)	Wagner (3–0)	**Alfonseca** (5–3)	—	44,180	43–42
86	July 10	@ Phillies	4–0	**Hampton** (4–8)	Abbott (2–8)	—	44,307	44–42
87	July 11	@ Phillies	6–4	**Ortiz** (10–6)	Wolf (3–5)	**Smoltz** (16)	44,519	45–42
**75th All-Star Game in Houston, Texas**
88	July 15	Expos	8–0	**Wright** (7–5)	Hernandez (6–9)	—	33,883	46–42
89	July 16	Expos	1–5	Horgan (2–0)	**Byrd** (2–2)	—	26,424	46–43
90	July 17	Expos	6–2	**Ortiz** (11–6)	Bentz (0–3)	**Smoltz** (17)	34,296	47–43
91	July 18	Expos	16–5	**Thomson** (7–7)	Downs (1–4)	—	23,952	48–43
92	July 19	Phillies	4–2	**Hampton** (5–8)	Abbott (2–9)	**Smoltz** (18)	25,790	49–43
93	July 20	Phillies	3–4 (10)	Worrell (3–3)	**Alfonseca** (5–4)	Wagner (15)	36,006	49–44
94	July 21	Pirates	3–4	Benson (8–7)	**Byrd** (2–3)	Mesa (27)	30,131	49–45
95	July 22	Pirates	2–1 (10)	**Reitsma** (4–2)	Torres (6–4)	—	32,963	50–45
–	July 23	@ Mets	Postponed (rain); rescheduled for September 13					
96	July 24	@ Mets	5–2	**Thomson** (8–7)	Stanton (0–4)	**Smoltz** (19)	33,166	51–45
97	July 25	@ Mets	4–3	**Hampton** (6–8)	Trachsel (9–7)	**Smoltz** (20)	32,542	52–45
98	July 26	@ Pirates	4–2	**Wright** (8–5)	Benson (8–8)	**Smoltz** (21)	19,164	53–45
99	July 27	@ Pirates	4–8	Gonzalez (3–0)	**Gryboski** (1–2)	—	15,946	53–46
100	July 28	@ Pirates	1–0	**Ortiz** (12–6)	Perez (6–5)	**Smoltz** (22)	22,977	54–46
101	July 29	@ Pirates	3–2	**Cruz** (3–0)	Mesa (2–1)	**Smoltz** (23)	25,988	55–46
102	July 30	Mets	3–1	**Hampton** (7–8)	Trachsel (9–8)	**Smoltz** (24)	40,913	56–46
103	July 31	Mets	8–0	**Wright** (9–5)	Benson (8–9)	—	51,125	57–46
*Games the Montreal Expos played at Hiram Bithorn Stadium in San Juan, Puerto Rico, during the 2004 season counted as Expos home games.

August: 20–8 (Home: 10–4; Away: 10–4)

#	Date	Opponent	Score	Win	Loss	Save	Attendance	Record
104	August 1	Mets	6–5	**Byrd** (3–3)	Glavine (8–9)	**Smoltz** (25)	34,203	58–46
105	August 3	@ Astros	2–3	Miceli (4–5)	**Reitsma** (4–3)	Lidge (12)	40,709	58–47
106	August 4	@ Astros	5–4	**Thomson** (9–7)	Munro (2–3)	**Smoltz** (26)	37,712	59–47
107	August 5	@ Astros	6–5	**Cruz** (4–0)	Miceli (4–6)	**Smoltz** (27)	37,015	60–47
108	August 6	@ Diamondbacks	4–2	**Jar. Wright** (10–5)	BWebb (4–13)	**Reitsma** (1)	29,368	61–47
109	August 7	@ Diamondbacks	6–2	**Byrd** (4–3)	Gonzalez (0–5)	—	33,249	62–47
110	August 8	@ Diamondbacks	11–4	**Ortiz** (13–6)	Fossum (2–11)	—	29,601	63–47
111	August 10	Brewers	2–3 (10)	Adams (2–1)	**Martin** (0–2)	Kolb (32)	21,681	63–48
112	August 11	Brewers	10–3	**Hampton** (8–8)	Santos (9–8)	—	21,673	64–48
113	August 12	Brewers	4–2	**Jar. Wright** (11–5)	Sheets (9–9)	**Smoltz** (28)	21,013	65–48
114	August 13	Cardinals	1–4	Williams (9–6)	**Byrd** (4–4)	Isringhausen (32)	38,843	65–49
115	August 14	Cardinals	9–7	**Alfonseca** (6–4)	King (4–2)	**Smoltz** (29)	44,413	66–49
116	August 15	Cardinals	4–10	Haren (1–2)	**Thomson** (9–8)	—	28,983	66–50
117	August 16	@ Padres	5–4	**Hampton** (9–8)	Hitchcock (0–2)	**Smoltz** (30)	34,426	67–50
118	August 17	@ Padres	6–11	Peavy (9–3)	**Jar. Wright** (11–6)	—	36,184	67–51
119	August 18	@ Padres	6–5	**Reitsma** (5–3)	Hoffman (2–3)	**Smoltz** (31)	36,827	68–51
120	August 19	@ Dodgers	6–5	**Reitsma** (6–3)	Gagne (4–3)	**Smoltz** (32)	42,287	69–51
121	August 20	@ Dodgers	2–3 (11)	Carrara (3–0)	**Cruz** (4–1)	—	54,993	69–52
122	August 21	@ Dodgers	4–7	Weaver (11–10)	**Hampton** (9–9)	Carrara (1)	52,398	69–53
123	August 22	@ Dodgers	10–1	**Jar. Wright** (12–6)	Alvarez (7–4)	—	49,513	70–53
124	August 24	Rockies	6–5	**Gryboski** (2–2)	Harikkala (5–3)	**Smoltz** (33)	27,914	71–53
125	August 25	Rockies	8–1	**Thomson** (10–8)	Francis (0–1)	—	25,534	72–53
126	August 26	Rockies	6–4	**Hampton** (10–9)	Jam. Wright (1–2)	**Smoltz** (34)	28,360	73–53
127	August 27	Giants	5–3	**Jar. Wright** (13–6)	Rueter (7–10)	**Smoltz** (35)	37,178	74–53
128	August 28	Giants	9–3	**Byrd** (5–4)	Schmidt (15–5)	—	42,549	75–53
129	August 29	Giants	5–9	Christiansen (4–2)	**Ortiz** (13–7)	Hermanson (7)	24,631	75–54
130	August 30	Giants	7–6	**Colon** (1–0)	Hermanson (5–6)	—	22,776	76–54
131	August 31	@ Phillies	5–3	**Hampton** (11–9)	Milton (13–3)	—	36,028	77–54

September: 17–11 (Home: 10–6; Away: 7–5)

#	Date	Opponent	Score	Win	Loss	Save	Attendance	Record
132	September 1	@ Phillies	7–2	**Wright** (14–6)	Padilla (5–7)	—	35,031	78–54
133	September 3	@ Expos	7–1	**Byrd** (6–4)	Downs (2–5)	—	8,617	79–54
134	September 4	@ Expos	9–0	**Ortiz** (14–7)	Patterson (3–4)	—	9,772	80–54
135	September 5	@ Expos	3–4 (12)	Tucker (4–2)	**Cruz** (4–2)	—	10,015	80–55
136	September 6	Phillies	3–1	**Smith** (1–3)	Milton (13–4)	**Smoltz** (36)	31,949	81–55
–	September 7	Phillies	Postponed (rain); rescheduled for September 8					
137	September 8 (1)	Phillies	3–5	Madson (8–2)	**Reitsma** (6–4)	Wagner (17)	N/A	81–56
138	September 8 (2)	Phillies	1–4	Jones (9–5)	**Byrd** (6–5)	Worrell (18)	20,320	81–57
139	September 9	Phillies	4–9	Madson (9–2)	**Colon** (1–1)	—	20,285	81–58
140	September 10	Expos	4–3	**Thomson** (11–8)	Patterson (3–5)	**Smoltz** (37)	22,086	82–58
141	September 11	Expos	8–1	**Cruz** (5–2)	Hernandez (10–13)	—	28,860	83–58
142	September 12	Expos	9–8 (12)	**Cruz** (6–2)	Ayala (5–10)	—	25,865	84–58
143	September 13 (1)	@ Mets	7–9	Heilman (1–1)	**Wright** (14–7)	—	N/A	84–59
144	September 13 (2)	@ Mets	7–1	**Byrd** (7–5)	Seo (4–10)	—	21,476	85–59
145	September 14	@ Mets	0–7	Benson (12–11)	**Ortiz** (14–8)	—	21,545	85–60
146	September 15	@ Mets	2–0	**Thomson** (12–8)	Leiter (9–7)	**Smoltz** (38)	29,704	86–60
147	September 16	@ Mets	4–9	Trachsel (11–13)	**Capellan** (0–1)	—	19,885	86–61
148	September 17	@ Marlins	8–1	**Byrd** (8–5)	Kensing (0–2)	—	26,084	87–61
149	September 18	@ Marlins	4–2	**Wright** (15–7)	Beckett (7–9)	**Smoltz** (39)	34,714	88–61
150	September 19	@ Marlins	0–3	Valdez (13–8)	**Ortiz** (14–9)	Benítez (43)	41,525	88–62
151	September 21	Reds	5–4	**Thomson** (13–8)	Claussen (2–6)	**Smoltz** (40)	20,359	89–62
152	September 22	Reds	8–11	Norton (2–5)	**Smoltz** (0–1)	Valentine (2)	19,573	89–63
153	September 23	Reds	2–3	Hudson (4–2)	**Wright** (15–8)	White (1)	21,519	89–64
154	September 24	Marlins	8–7	**Smith** (2–3)	Mota (9–7)	**Smoltz** (41)	28,632	90–64
155	September 25	Marlins	1–0	**Hampton** (12–9)	Pavano (17–8)	**Reitsma** (2)	42,772	91–64
156	September 26	Marlins	6–3	**Thomson** (14–8)	Willis (10–11)	—	31,351	92–64
–	September 27	Mets	Postponed (rain); rescheduled for September 28					
157	September 28 (1)	Mets	1–2	Trachsel (12–13)	**Byrd** (8–6)	Looper (29)	N/A	92–65
158	September 28 (2)	Mets	5–2	**Colon** (2–1)	Glavine (10–14)	**Smoltz** (42)	35,729	93–65
159	September 29	Mets	6–3	**Ortiz** (15–9)	Heilman (1–3)	**Smoltz** (43)	22,000	94–65

October: 2–1 (Home: 0–0; Away: 2–1)

#	Date	Opponent	Score	Win	Loss	Save	Attendance	Record
160	October 1	@ Cubs	5–4	**Hampton** (13–9)	Wood (8–9)	**Gryboski** (2)	38,795	95–65
161	October 2	@ Cubs	8–6	**Gryboski** (3–2)	Farnsworth (4–5)	**Smoltz** (44)	38,695	96–65
162	October 3	@ Cubs	8–10	Maddux (16–11)	**Byrd** (8–7)	Hawkins (25)	38,420	96–66

Legend: = Win = Loss
Bold = Braves team member

== Player stats ==
=== Batting ===
==== Starters by position ====
Note: Pos = Position; G = Games played; AB = At bats; H = Hits; Avg. = Batting average; HR = Home runs; RBI = Runs batted in

Pos	Player	G	AB	H	Avg.	HR	RBI
C	Johnny Estrada	134	462	145	.314	9	76
1B	Adam LaRoche	110	324	90	.278	13	45
2B	Marcus Giles	102	379	118	.311	8	48
SS	Rafael Furcal	143	563	157	.279	14	59
3B	Chipper Jones	137	472	117	.248	30	96
LF	Charles Thomas	83	236	68	.288	7	31
CF	Andruw Jones	154	570	149	.261	29	91
RF	J.D. Drew	145	518	158	.305	31	93

==== Other batters ====
Note: G = Games played; AB = At bats; H = Hits; Avg. = Batting average; HR = Home runs; RBI = Runs batted in

Player	G	AB	H	Avg.	HR	RBI
Julio Franco	125	320	99	.309	6	57
Mark DeRosa	118	309	74	.239	3	31
Nick Green	95	264	72	.273	3	26
Eli Marrero	90	250	80	.320	10	40
Eddie Pérez	74	170	39	.229	3	13
DeWayne Wise	77	162	37	.228	6	17
Jesse Garcia	50	115	29	.252	1	10
Mike Hessman	29	69	9	.130	2	5
Wilson Betemit	22	47	8	.170	0	3
Damon Hollins	7	22	8	.364	0	5

=== Pitching ===
==== Starting pitchers ====
Note: G = Games pitched; IP = Innings pitched; W = Wins; L = Losses; ERA = Earned run average; SO = Strikeouts

Player	G	IP	W	L	ERA	SO
Russ Ortiz	34	204.2	15	9	4.13	143
John Thomson	33	198.1	14	8	3.72	133
Jaret Wright	32	186.1	15	8	3.28	159
Mike Hampton	29	172.1	13	9	4.28	87
Paul Byrd	19	114.1	8	7	3.94	79
Horacio Ramírez	10	60.1	2	4	2.39	31

==== Other pitchers ====
Note: G = Games pitched; IP = Innings pitched; W = Wins; L = Losses; ERA = Earned run average; SO = Strikeouts

Player	G	IP	W	L	ERA	SO
Travis Smith	16	40.2	2	3	6.20	26
José Capellán	3	8.0	0	1	11.25	4

==== Relief pitchers ====
Note: G = Games pitched; W = Wins; L = Losses; SV = Saves; ERA = Earned run average; SO = Strikeouts

Player	G	W	L	SV	ERA	SO
John Smoltz	73	0	1	44	2.76	85
Chris Reitsma	84	6	4	2	4.07	60
Antonio Alfonseca	79	6	4	0	2.57	45
Kevin Gryboski	69	3	2	2	2.84	24
Juan Cruz	50	6	2	0	2.75	70
Tom Martin	29	0	1	0	3.71	12
C.J. Nitkowski	22	1	0	0	4.50	16
Román Colón	18	2	1	0	3.32	15
Armando Almanza	13	1	1	0	6.17	13
Tim Drew	11	0	0	0	4.50	7
Sam McConnell	10	1	0	0	3.86	4
Will Cunnane	9	1	1	0	7.30	11
Dan Meyer	2	0	0	0	0.00	1

== Postseason ==
=== Game log ===
2004 Postseason Game Log
National League Division Series: 2–3

#	Date	Opponent	Score	Win	Loss	Save	Attendance	Record
1	October 6	Astros	3–9	Clemens (1–0)	Wright (0–1)	—	41,464	0–1
2	October 7	Astros	4–2 (11)	Alfonseca (1–0)	Miceli (0–1)	—	40,075	1–1
3	October 9	@ Astros	5–8	Backe (1–0)	Byrd (0–1)	Lidge (1)	43,547	1–2
4	October 10	@ Astros	6–5	Smoltz (1–0)	Springer (0–1)	—	43,336	2–2
5	October 11	Astros	3–12	Oswalt (1–0)	Wright (0–2)	—	54,068	2–3

== Award winners ==
2004 Major League Baseball season

- Bobby Cox was voted National League Manager of the Year for the second of three times with the Atlanta Braves.
- Andruw Jones (outfield) was once again chosen to receive a Gold Glove award.
- Johnny Estrada (catcher) was chosen to receive a Silver Slugger award.

2004 Major League Baseball All-Star Game Johnny Estrada represented the Atlanta Braves as a catcher for the National League All-Star team.

== Farm system ==
Level	Team	League	Manager
AAA	Richmond Braves	International League	Pat Kelly
AA	Greenville Braves	Southern League	Brian Snitker
A	Myrtle Beach Pelicans	Carolina League	Randy Ingle
A	Rome Braves	South Atlantic League	Rocket Wheeler
Rookie	Danville Braves	Appalachian League	Jim Saul
Rookie	GCL Braves	Gulf Coast League	Ralph Henriquez
