= Víctor Zambrano =

Venezuelan baseball player (born 1975)

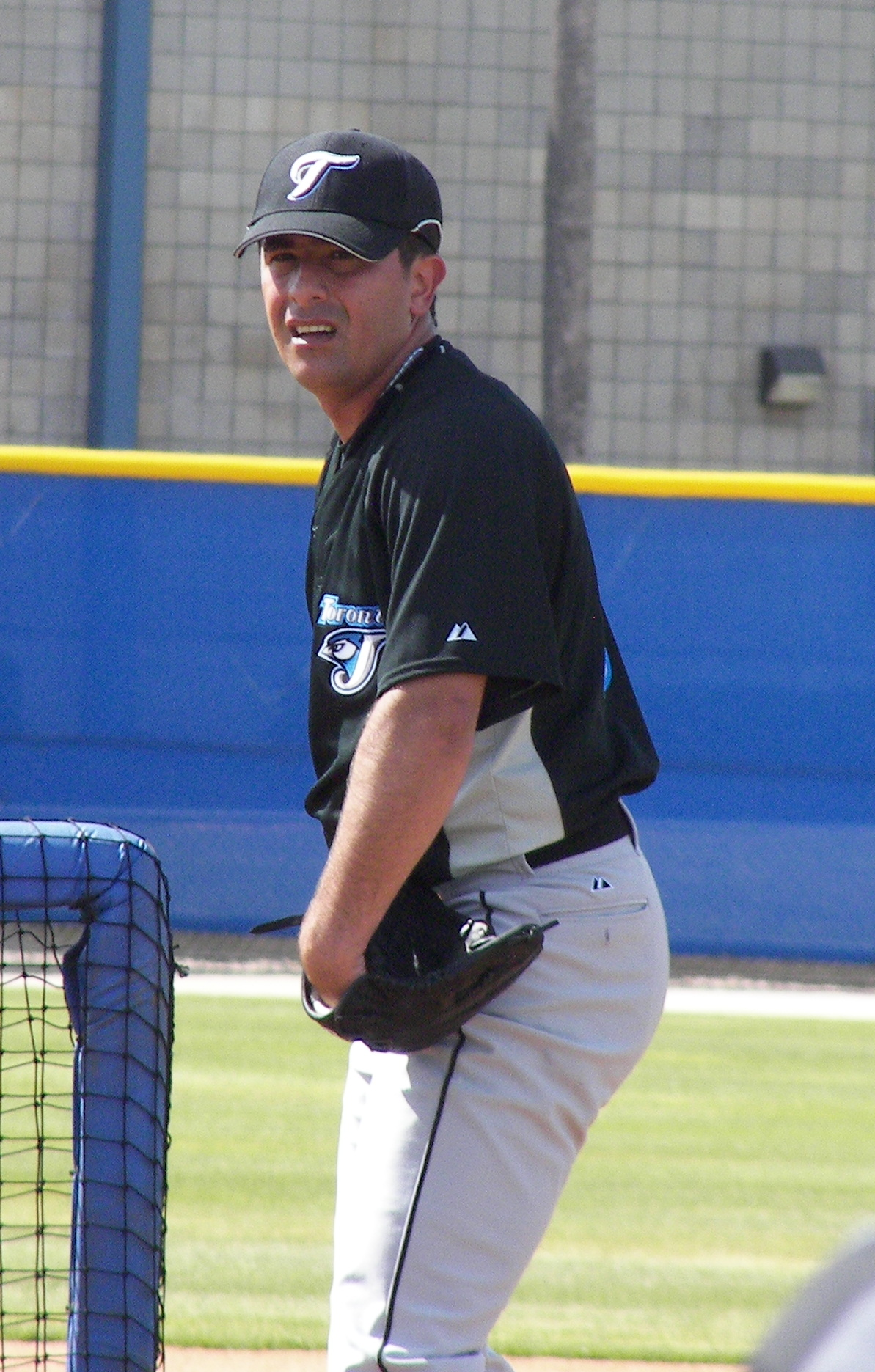
- Pitcher
- Born: August 6, 1975 (age 50); Los Teques, Venezuela
- Batted: Switch Threw: Right

MLB debut
- June 21, 2001, for the Tampa Bay Devil Rays

Last MLB appearance
- September 30, 2007, for the Baltimore Orioles

MLB statistics
- Win–loss record: 45–44
- Earned run average: 4.64
- Strikeouts: 529
- Stats at Baseball Reference

Teams
- Tampa Bay Devil Rays (2001–2004); New York Mets (2004–2006); Toronto Blue Jays (2007); Baltimore Orioles (2007)

Víctor Manuel Zambrano (born August 6, 1975) is a Venezuelan former professional baseball pitcher. He played all or parts of seven seasons in Major League Baseball (MLB) from 2001 to 2007 for the Tampa Bay Devil Rays, New York Mets, Toronto Blue Jays, and Baltimore Orioles.

== Professional career ==
Zambrano had a good repertoire and an aggressive pitching approach, using his 92–95 mph sinking fastball, a changeup, and occasionally a quality slider. He was a converted infielder who fielded his position well and did a decent job holding on runners. However, his effectiveness was hampered by a lack of control.

=== Minor leagues ===
Zambrano was originally signed as a free agent by the New York Yankees in 1993. He started his professional career in 1994 with the GCL Yankees, but was released by the team prior to the 1996 season. He was signed by the Tampa Bay Devil Rays, then spent the next several seasons working his way up through their minor league organization before making his major league debut in 2001.

=== Major league career (2001–2007) ===
In 2003, he led the American League in walks, wild pitches, and hit batsmen, and in walks again in 2004, despite being traded to the National League at midseason. The New York Mets acquired him, along with reliever Bartolomé Fortunato, in a highly criticized deal for top-ranked pitching prospect Scott Kazmir and minor league pitcher Joselo Diaz.

On May 6, 2006, Zambrano suffered a torn flexor tendon in his pitching elbow, disabling him for the rest of the 2006 season. Doctors unexpectedly found a torn elbow ligament during surgery on May 15, resulting in the second Tommy John elbow surgery of his career. Zambrano was expected to be sidelined well into the 2007 season, and he was non-tendered by the Mets, and became a free agent in December 2006.

On January 30, 2007, Zambrano signed a minor league contract, with an invitation to Major League spring training with the Toronto Blue Jays. He appeared in only eight games (two of them starts), before he was released on July 9. After signing a minor league contract with the Pittsburgh Pirates, his contract was purchased by the Baltimore Orioles on September 9, 2007. For the rest of the 2007 season, he appeared in 5 games for the Orioles, made 2 starts, and was 0–1 with a 9.49 ERA. Following the 2007 season, he was released by the Orioles on October 1.

=== Back to the minor leagues ===
On February 5, 2008, he signed a minor league contract with an invitation to spring training with the Colorado Rockies. On June 7, 2008, the Rockies released him. He signed with the New York Yankees on July 31, 2008, and became a free agent at the end of the season.

=== Taiwan ===
Zambrano began the 2009 season in the Mexican League with the Sultanes de Monterrey. After appearing in 16 games with the Sultanes, he signed La New Bears of Taiwan's Chinese Professional Baseball League in August. He made his debut on September 1, pitching six innings with two earned runs. He lost to the Uni Lions' Nerio Rodríguez 9 to 5.

=== Mexican League ===
After the 2009 season ended and no team had picked Zambrano up, he decided to retire from baseball. He briefly attempted a comeback in the Mexican League in 2010 with the Dorados de Chihuahua, but was let go after appearing in eight games with an ERA of 7.02. He has not pitched professionally since.

== Personal life ==
Victor has often mistakenly been thought to be related to former Chicago Cubs and Miami Marlins pitcher Carlos Zambrano. Both Carlos and Víctor Zambrano are Venezuelan. Although they lived just an hour away from each other as children, they never knew each other.

In October 2009, his mother was kidnapped. She was rescued three days later by members of the Venezuelan national police. Three suspects were arrested. A fourth is still at large.

== See also ==
- List of Major League Baseball players from Venezuela

| Preceded by Joe Kennedy | Tampa Bay Devil Rays Opening Day; Starting pitcher 2004 | Succeeded by Dewon Brazelton |
