= Scott Kazmir =

American baseball player (born 1984)

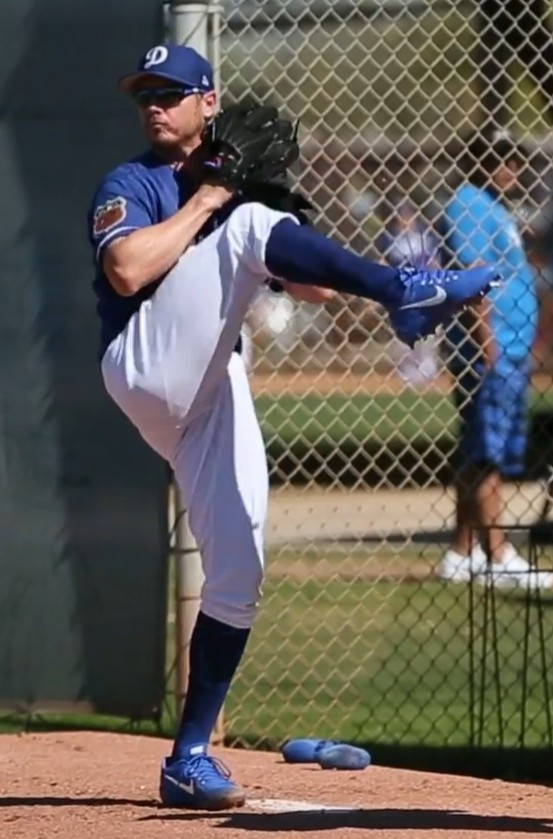
- Kazmir with the Los Angeles Dodgers in 2017
- Pitcher
- Born: January 24, 1984 (age 42); Houston, Texas, U.S.
- Batted: Left Threw: Left

MLB debut
- August 23, 2004, for the Tampa Bay Devil Rays

Last MLB appearance
- September 30, 2021, for the San Francisco Giants

MLB statistics
- Win–loss record: 108–97
- Earned run average: 4.02
- Strikeouts: 1,618
- Stats at Baseball Reference

Teams
- Tampa Bay Devil Rays / Rays (2004–2009); Los Angeles Angels (2009–2011); Cleveland Indians (2013); Oakland Athletics (2014–2015); Houston Astros (2015); Los Angeles Dodgers (2016); San Francisco Giants (2021)

Career highlights and awards
- 3× All-Star (2006, 2008, 2014); AL strikeout leader (2007)
Medals
Men's baseball
Representing United States
Olympic Games
Silver medal – second place	2020 Tokyo	Team

Scott Edward Kazmir (/ˈkæzmɪər/; born January 24, 1984) is an American former professional baseball pitcher who participated in 15 Major League Baseball (MLB) seasons between 2004 and 2021, most notably with the Tampa Bay Rays.

Kazmir was born and raised in the Houston, Texas area and gained the attention of MLB scouts as an award-winning multi-sport high school athlete. He was chosen in the first round (15th overall) of the 2002 Major League Baseball draft by the New York Mets and quickly progressed through the lower levels of the club's minor league system. He was one of the top pitching prospects in 2004 when the Mets sent him to the Tampa Bay Devil Rays in a trade deadline deal that has been listed as one of the most lopsided in recent major league history. The Devil Rays soon called him up to the major leagues, and he made his MLB debut as a 20 year old in August 2004. Kazmir quickly became a mainstay in Tampa Bay's starting rotation, winning at least 10 games in each of his four complete seasons with the club at a time when the team lost at least 90 games per year. He was named to his first All Star team in 2006, led the American League with 239 strikeouts in 2007, and is still among Tampa Bay's all-time leaders in many pitching categories, including strikeouts, earned run average (ERA), wins, and games started.

Kazmir missed time due to injury in 2008 and early 2009, and the Rays dealt him to the Los Angeles Angels of Anaheim at the 2009 trade deadline. Continuing issues with his health and pitching mechanics reduced his effectiveness over the following seasons and the Angels released him in June 2011. Kazmir did not sign with any major league organization over the next season and a half as he independently sought to regain his form. He returned to the majors with the Cleveland Indians in 2013 and placed third in voting for American League Comeback Player of the Year after winning ten games. He then signed a two-year contract with the Oakland Athletics and continued his resurgence, as he was named an All-Star and earned a career high 15 wins in 2014. The A's dealt Kazmir to his hometown Houston Astros at the 2015 trade deadline, and he signed a three-year, $48 million contract with the Los Angeles Dodgers after the season.

Kazmir won 10 games for the Dodgers in 2016, but a series of injuries kept him out of the big leagues for the final two years of his contract, and he remained unsigned in 2019. He began another comeback in 2020 with an independent minor league team and returned to the major leagues in 2021 with the San Francisco Giants, for whom he started four games. Also in 2021, Kazmir was selected as a member of the United States national baseball team for the Summer Olympics in Tokyo, where he started and won the quarterfinal game.

== High school career ==
Kazmir attended Cypress Falls High School in Harris County, Texas. He played both varsity baseball and junior varsity football at the school until his junior year, when he decided to focus on baseball to great success. During one stretch on the high school baseball diamond, Kazmir threw five no-hitters in six games: four consecutive no-hitters, then a one-hit game, then another no-hitter. As a senior, he struck out 172 batters in 75 innings pitched and had an earned run average (ERA) of 0.37.

Kazmir was recruited by several major college baseball programs and verbally committed to play for the Texas Longhorns baseball team. However, after he was drafted in the first round (15th overall) of the 2002 MLB draft by the New York Mets, he decided to sign a professional baseball contract and did not attend college. His high school teammate Clint Everts was selected 5th overall by the Montreal Expos, and they became the first pair of pitchers from the same high school team to be drafted in the first round.

== Professional career ==
=== New York Mets ===
Kazmir quickly advanced through the lower level of the New York Mets' minor league system. He led the minor leagues in strikeouts per nine innings in 2003 and was promoted to the Binghamton Mets of the Double-A Eastern League in July 2004 during his second full season of pro baseball.

=== Tampa Bay Devil Rays / Rays ===
On July 30, 2004, Kazmir was traded along with minor league pitcher Joselo Díaz to the Tampa Bay Devil Rays in exchange for veteran starting pitcher Víctor Zambrano and minor league reliever Bartolomé Fortunato. The trade was widely criticized by the New York media and fan base at the time, and given Kazmir's subsequent success and the limited contributions from the oft-injured Zambrano, the trade has often been mentioned as one of the most uneven trading deadline deals in major league history.

The Devil Rays sent Kazmir to their Double-A affiliate, the Montgomery Biscuits of the Southern League, where he started four games, throwing 25 innings and allowing 14 hits while striking out 24. In late August, Tampa Bay called him up to the major leagues, bypassing the Triple-A level altogether.

==== 2004–2005 ====
Kazmir made his major league debut on August 23, 2004, pitching five shutout innings against the Seattle Mariners. He initially struggled with his control and had a 2–3 record and an ERA of 5.67 in 8 appearances (7 starts) in 2004, but he showed potential by striking out 11.07 batters per nine innings. On September 9, Kazmir made his only relief appearance with the Rays, allowing one run in three innings against the Yankees.

==== 2006 season ====
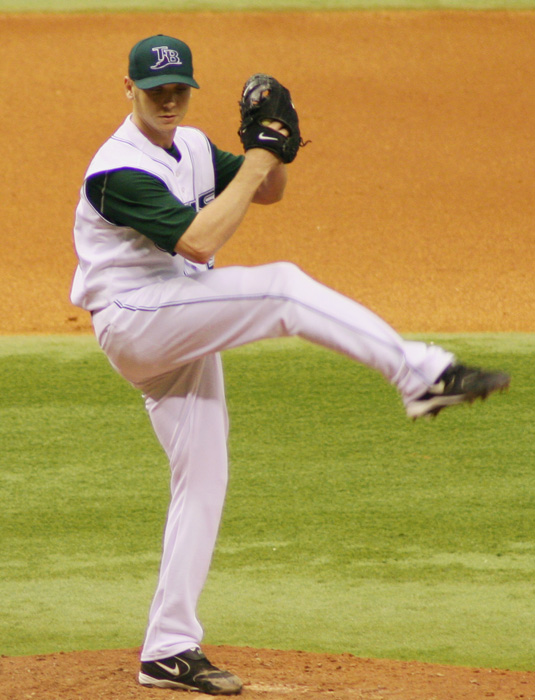
Kazmir pitching for the Tampa Bay Devil Rays in 2006

Kazmir started the 2006 season opener April 3 at Baltimore. At 22 years, 2 months and 10 days Kazmir was the youngest opening day starter since Dwight Gooden with the Mets in 1986. He lost the decision after 6 ER in 4 IP, but his first full major league season was a success overall, with a record of 10–8 (on a Devil Rays team that lost 101 games) with 163 strikeouts and a 3.24 ERA in 144.2 innings. Kazmir often pitched best when facing the opponent's ace starter; he won decisions against Cy Young winner Roy Halladay, two-time 20 game winner Jamie Moyer, two-time All-Star and 20 game winner Dontrelle Willis, 2001 World Series co-MVP and 3-time 20 game winner Curt Schilling, and 2003 World Series MVP Josh Beckett.

On June 22, 2006, Scott Kazmir passed Sandy Koufax and put himself in the 22nd spot in MLB history for most strikeouts by a left-handed pitcher before his 23rd birthday. He also picked up his team leading ninth victory in the process.

On July 2, 2006, Kazmir was elected by the players to appear in the 2006 MLB All-Star Game, his first all-star appearance. The next day, he threw his first (and thus far only) complete game shutout, blanking the Boston Red Sox in Tropicana Field on 2 hits while striking out 10.

In the All-Star Game, Kazmir threw a perfect sixth inning, retiring Freddy Sanchez, Carlos Beltrán, and Albert Pujols.

On August 22, 2006, Kazmir struck out eight Texas Rangers, becoming the all-time Rays strikeout leader.

==== 2007 season ====
2007 is generally considered to be Kazmir's best year. He led the AL in strikeouts (239) and games started (34) and also set career highs in wins (13 on a Devil Rays team that won only 64 games), innings pitched (206 2/3), and WAR (5.8). He became the first pitcher in Tampa Bay history to total over 200 strikeouts in a season, and to date, he is the only pitcher in team history to lead the league in strikeouts.

Kazmir was one of the MLB's most unhittable pitchers in 2007, with hitters only making contact 74.5% of the time, the fourth best in the league. In their year-end review, Baseball Prospectus proclaimed, "Health permitting, he’s one of the best pitchers in the AL."

It was also during this time that Tampa Bay fans began crowning Kazmir with the nickname "Pizza Man" which was a reference to a longstanding promotion at Tropicana Field where if the Rays pitching staff combined for 10 strikeouts during a game, attendees of the game could trade in their ticket stub for a free pizza at participating Papa John's restaurants. The inference was that when Kazmir was pitching, there was a much higher chance of a free pizza for fans.

==== 2008 season ====
Kazmir strained his elbow at the beginning of spring training in 2008. While the injury was not considered serious at the time, the Rays were cautious with their star pitcher. His recovery and belated season preparation delayed his first start until May 4, when he faced the Boston Red Sox in Fenway Park. He set a team record for wins in a month in May, going 5–1 with a 1.22 ERA and not allowed more than 1 run or 4 hits in a game after his first start. For his efforts, he was named the AL pitcher of the month, the first Rays player to win the honor.

Kazmir was named to the American League squad for the 2008 MLB All-Star Game. Though the Rays' management preferred that Kazmir rest his arm and not pitch in the mid-summer classic if at all possible, the game ended up being the longest ever and Kazmir stepped to the mound in the 15th inning. He threw a scoreless frame and the AL all-stars scored the winning run in the bottom of the 15th, making Kazmir the winning pitcher.

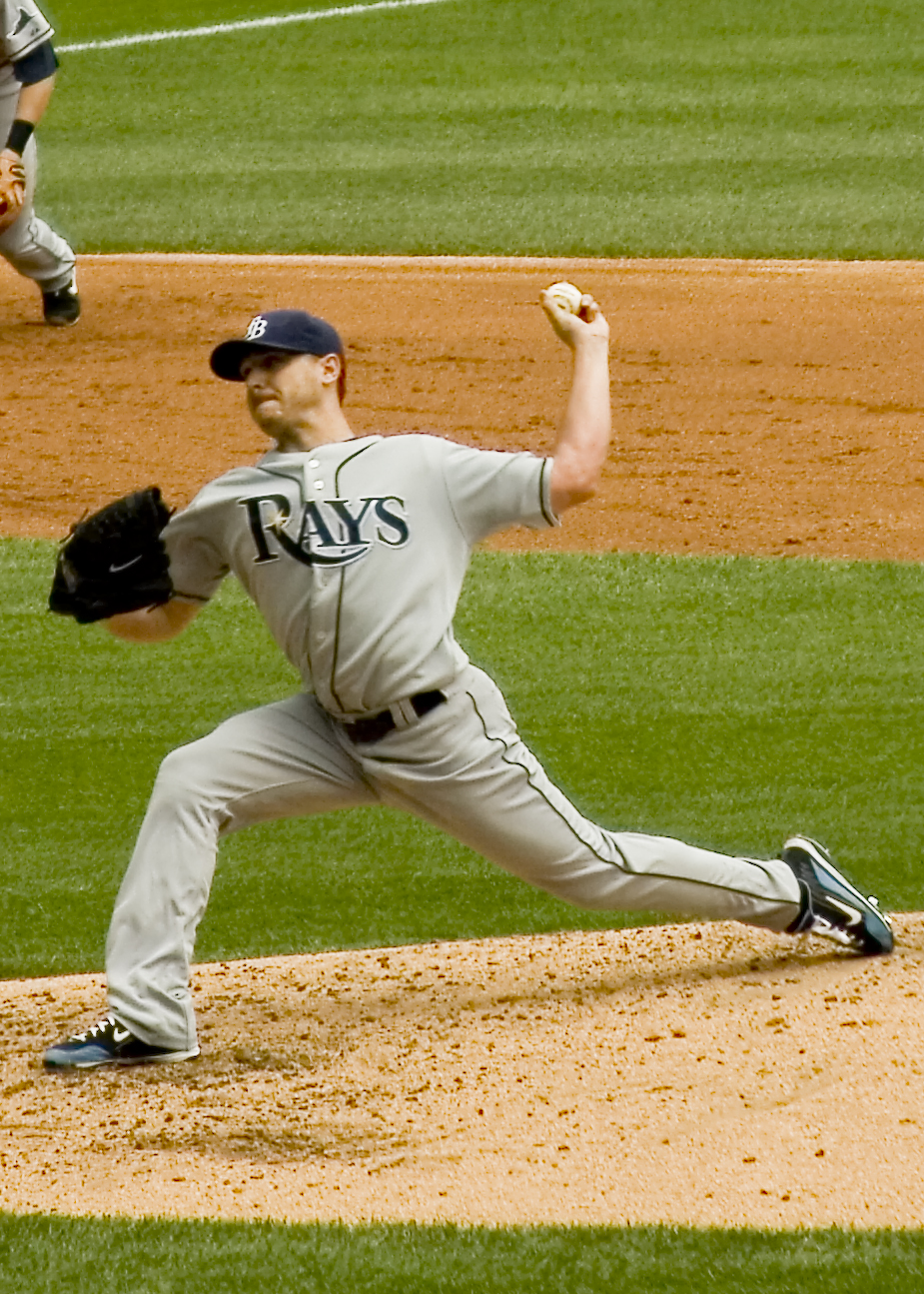
Kazmir pitching for the Tampa Bay Rays in 2009

Kazmir was less effective over the second half of the season, posting a 5–3 record and 4.02 ERA as the Rays won their first American League East championship. In the postseason, Kazmir made 5 starts and went 1–1 with a 4.21 ERA as the Rays won their first AL pennant. But in what was a continuing trend, he could never work very deep into a ballgame, averaging just 5 innings while throwing over 100 pitches per start in the playoffs.

Kazmir averaged 4.28 pitches per plate appearance on the season, the highest rate in the majors. "He's an ace as far as his numbers go", Baseball Prospectus wrote, "But he doesn't do many of the other things one expects from an ace. He regularly misses time here and there (in 2008 it was an early-season elbow strain), he's so inefficient that he often hits 100 pitches before he's made it to the fifth inning, and he can become a scheduled strain on the bullpen. Don't get us wrong, he's great, and clearly worth the nearly $40 million he'll receive over the next four years, but he's far from deserving of the "ace" designation."

During the season, the Rays and Kazmir agreed on a four-year contract extension which guaranteed the lefty $28.5 million and had a maximum value of approximately $39.5 million if the team picked up his option for the 2012 season.

==== 2009 season ====
Kazmir again started the 2009 season on the disabled list with elbow issues and was activated on April 8. He accrued a 4–4 record with an ERA of 7.69 before going on the disabled list again on May 23 to rest a leg strain and to work on problems with his pitching mechanics. He returned on June 27 and went on to have a record of 8–7 with an ERA of 5.92 and 91 strikeouts as of August 28, 2009.

=== Los Angeles Angels of Anaheim ===
==== Rest of the 2009 season ====
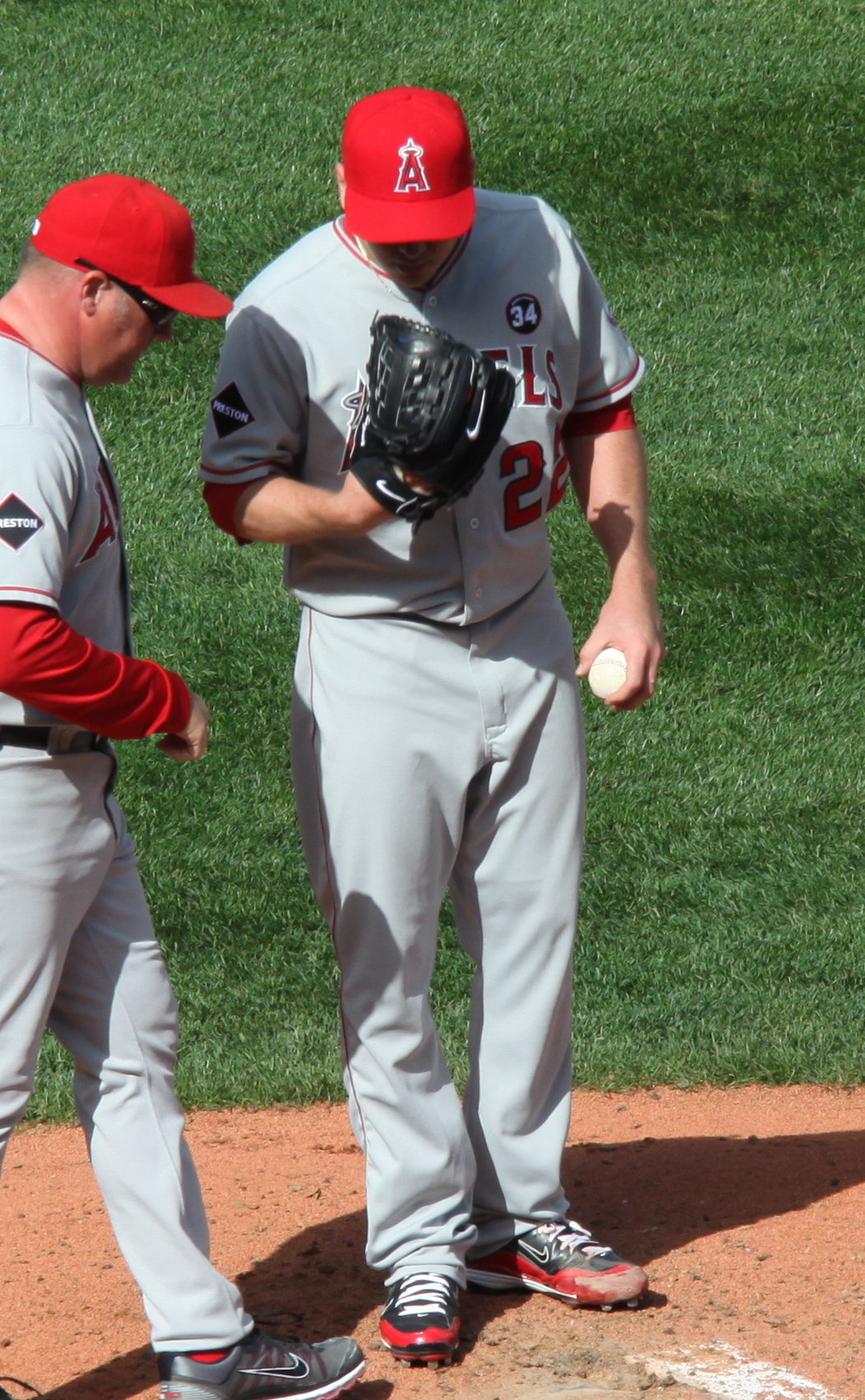
Kazmir with the Los Angeles Angels in 2009

On August 28, 2009, Kazmir was traded to the Los Angeles Angels of Anaheim for second baseman Sean Rodriguez and minor leaguers Alexander Torres and Matt Sweeney.

On his Angels debut, against the Seattle Mariners, he received the loss, going 6 1/3 innings, giving up one earned run and striking out eight. At one point he retired 16 batters in a row.

Scott Kazmir made his home debut with the Los Angeles Angels of Anaheim on September 8, 2009, once again pitching against the Seattle Mariners, going seven innings and giving up only one run in a no-decision. Kazmir continued to pitch well for his new team during the remaining month of the regular season, posting a 2–2 record with a 1.73 ERA. However, he fared less well in the postseason, going 0–1 with a 7.56 ERA in two starts and one appearance in relief.

In spring training 2010, Kazmir noted that he was not in best shape in the 2009 season. "I'd get nine or 10 pitches into an inning, and I didn't have the explosiveness I wanted", Kazmir said. "I was falling off pitches and stuff like that. At one point, you kind of wonder."

==== 2010 season ====
In the offseason, Kazmir focused on strength and flexibility training to reduce strain on his arm. Manager Mike Scioscia said, "He'll be in the right arm slot more often instead of dropping down to compensate or flying open", Scioscia said. "It's all connected. With a more consistent delivery, he'll minimize risk to his arm, because it's not doing more work than it has to."

Despite this winter regimen, Kazmir began the season on the disabled list with hamstring and shoulder issues. He made his first start on April 15, a loss to the Yankees. His struggles continued throughout the first half of the season, as he posted the worst ERA among starters in the AL (6.92) along with a 7–9 record. Quoted in the Los Angeles Times in July, Kazmir said "It kind of feels like I'm thinking too much about where I'm throwing the ball and things start snowballing, and the next thing you know you don't really know what's going on."

On July 18, he was placed on the disabled list with left shoulder fatigue.

Kazmir returned in August to mixed results. He finished the season with a 9–15 record in 28 starts, and his 5.94 ERA was the highest in MLB among pitchers who worked 140 or more innings.

==== 2011 season ====
Kazmir struggled again in spring training, giving up 19 runs in 23+ innings, and was touched for 5 runs in 2+ innings in his first regular season start. Angels manager Mike Scioscia said that Kazmir's struggles were "baffling" and that, despite a rigorous off-season training regimen, the former all-star pitcher had lost his velocity, command, and confidence. Kazmir was placed on the DL and sent to extended spring training to "sort things out".

After working on his mechanics for a month, Kazmir was sent to the Salt Lake Bees, the Angels' Triple-A affiliate, for a series of rehabilitation starts as he tried to work his way back to the major leagues, possibly as a relief pitcher. However, his struggles only grew worse in the minors. Kazmir had a 17.02 ERA in 5 starts, walking 20 and striking out 14 in 15+ innings with his fastball velocity down to the lows 80s. He was released by the Angels on June 15 despite having $14.5 million remaining on his guaranteed contract.

=== First comeback ===
In December 2011, Kazmir tried to regain his form pitching winter ball for Leones del Escogido in the Dominican League. His only start with the club did not go well, as he gave up 2 hits, 2 walks, and 4 earned runs in one third of an inning.

Kazmir sought help from several athletic trainers as he sought to regain his pitching, and he eventually began training with Ron Wolforth, an independent pitching expert in the Houston area. Kazmir slowly rebuilt his pitching mechanics for several months, and though he held bullpen sessions for scouts from several major league teams in the spring of 2012, he did not sign with a major league organization.

On July 7, 2012, Kazmir signed with the Sugar Land Skeeters of the independent Atlantic League, who play near his hometown of Houston. Kazmir started 14 games for the Skeeters and finished the season with a 3–6 record and a 5.34 ERA.

In November 2012, Kazmir signed with Gigantes de Carolina of the Puerto Rican Professional Baseball League. While he posted a 4.37 ERA, he struck out 27 batters in 23 innings and his fastball velocity was reported to be back in the 94–95 MPH range.

=== Cleveland Indians ===
==== 2013 season ====
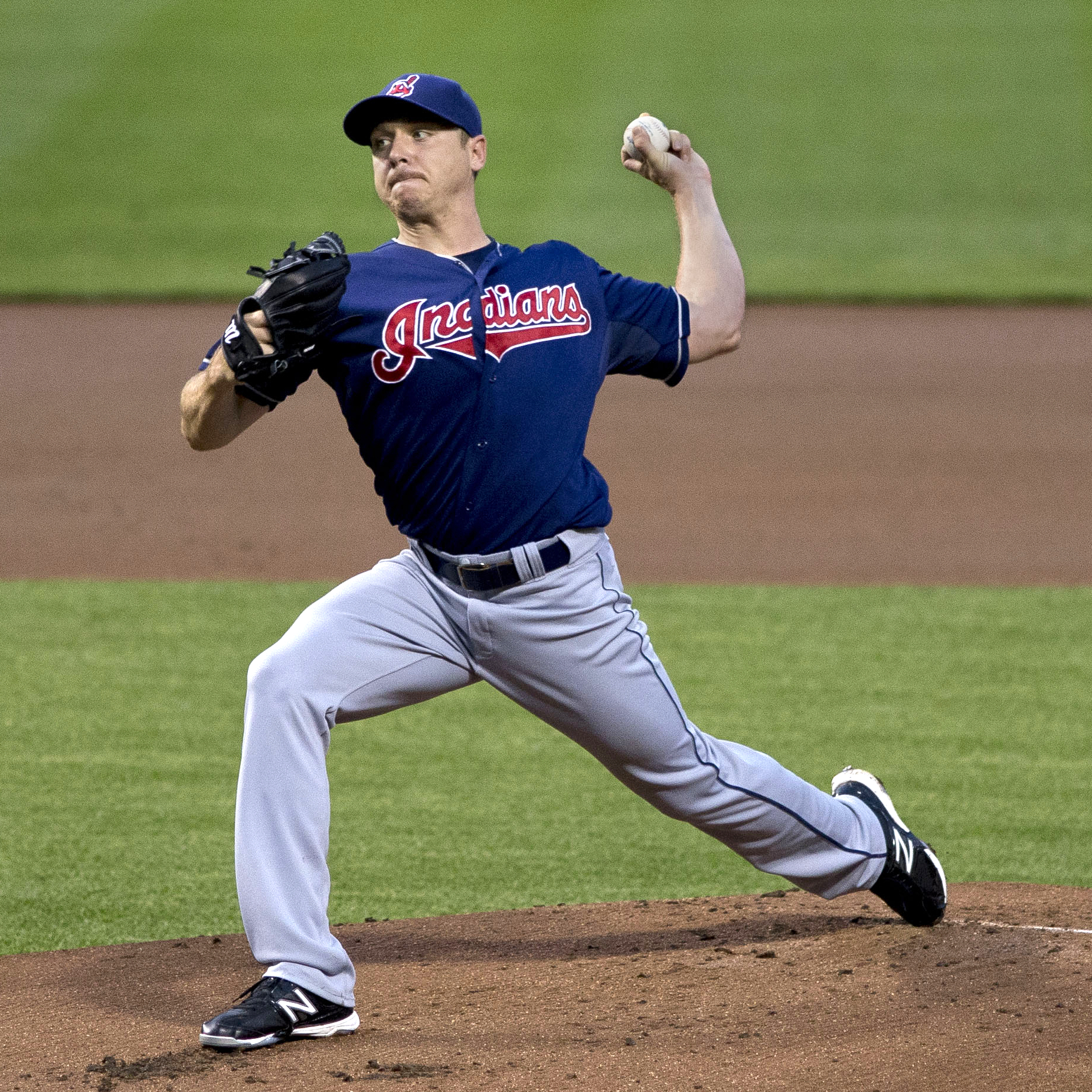
Kazmir pitching for the Cleveland Indians in 2013

Kazmir signed a minor league contract with the Cleveland Indians on December 21, 2012, and received an invitation to spring training. After pitching well during the spring, he was named the team's 5th starter heading into the regular season. On May 4, 2013, against the Minnesota Twins, Kazmir won his first major league game since 2010. In his next start he fanned 10 Oakland batters without issuing a walk during six innings of one-run ball to win his second consecutive start. It was the first time winning back-to-back starts since his 2010 season.

While not consistently regaining his former velocity, Kazmir's ability to better command his pitches helped him to have a season that saw him come in third in the voting for the 2013 American League Comeback Player of the Year Kazmir started 29 games (his most since 2007), posted a 10–9 record (most wins since 2009), and had a career-best strikeout to walk ratio of 3.45.

=== Oakland Athletics ===
==== 2014 season ====
After his resurgent season in Cleveland, Kazmir signed a two-year, $22 million contract with the Oakland Athletics on December 3, 2013. Kazmir pitched 190 innings for the A's in 2014, the second-highest total of his career, and finished the season with a 3.55 ERA and 15 wins, a career high. Although his strikeouts per 9 innings rate dropped sharply from the previous season (9.2 to 7.8), Kazmir posted a career-best walks/hits per 9 inning rate (1.161) and was named to the 2014 AL All-Star team, his third appearance in the game and first since 2008. He was less effective in the second half, and his ERA rose over a full run from the All-Star break until the end of the season.

==== 2015 season ====
In 2015, Kazmir began the season as the A's third starter and enjoyed one of the most effective extended stretches of his major league career. Over his first 18 starts, Kazmir's 2.38 ERA and ratios of 8.3 strikeouts and 6.9 hits per nine innings were among the best in the American League. He was also consistent, only once giving up more than three earned runs in a start during that span.

The A's were not in serious contention for a playoff spot as the trade deadline approached, and Kazmir was rumored to be a potential acquisition target for several teams seeking to improve their starting pitching. On July 23, 2015, he was traded to the Houston Astros for two prospect—catcher Jacob Nottingham and pitcher Daniel Mengden.

=== Houston Astros ===
==== Rest of the 2015 season ====
Kazmir won his debut with the hometown Astros, going seven innings and giving up three hits with three strikeouts in a 4–0 victory over the Kansas City Royals. The continuation of an outstanding month of July, Kazmir produced a 0.26 ERA and 24 strikeouts in 34 innings over five starts split with Oakland and Houston on the way to being named AL Pitcher of the Month for the second time in his career. The third-lowest July ERA in MLB history, Kazmir did not surrender any home runs, and batters managed just a .134 average against. However, his effectiveness as an Astro waned, allowing a 4.17 ERA with ratios of 9.6 hits and 6.6 strikeouts per nine innings, and 2–6 record over 13 starts. His totals with Oakland and Houston included 7–11 W–L, 3.10 ERA, and 155 strikeouts in 183 innings over 31 starts; the ERA qualified as fourth-best in the American League. It was the only point in his major league career that Kazmir recorded 30 or more starts in consecutive seasons. He also led MLB pitchers in errors, with seven.

Houston made the playoffs as a wildcard team, the club's first playoff experience since 2005. Kazmir started game two of the American League Division Series (ALDS) versus Kansas City. Pitching into the 6th inning, he surrendered 3 runs to leave the game with the Astros holding a 4–3 lead. However, the Royals came back to win, 5–4, and took the series in five games.

=== Los Angeles Dodgers ===
==== 2016 season ====
On December 30, 2015, Kazmir signed a 3-year, $48 million deal with the Los Angeles Dodgers. He made 26 starts for the Dodgers, with a 10–6 record and 4.56 ERA. Kazmir's hip began to bother him in August, affecting his mechanics. He struggled through several short starts and was placed on the disabled list after being pulled in the third inning of a game on August 22. He returned to the mound on September 23 but felt muscle discomfort after one inning and was subsequently removed from the game and shut down for the season. The short appearance would be his last in the major leagues until 2021.

==== 2017 season ====
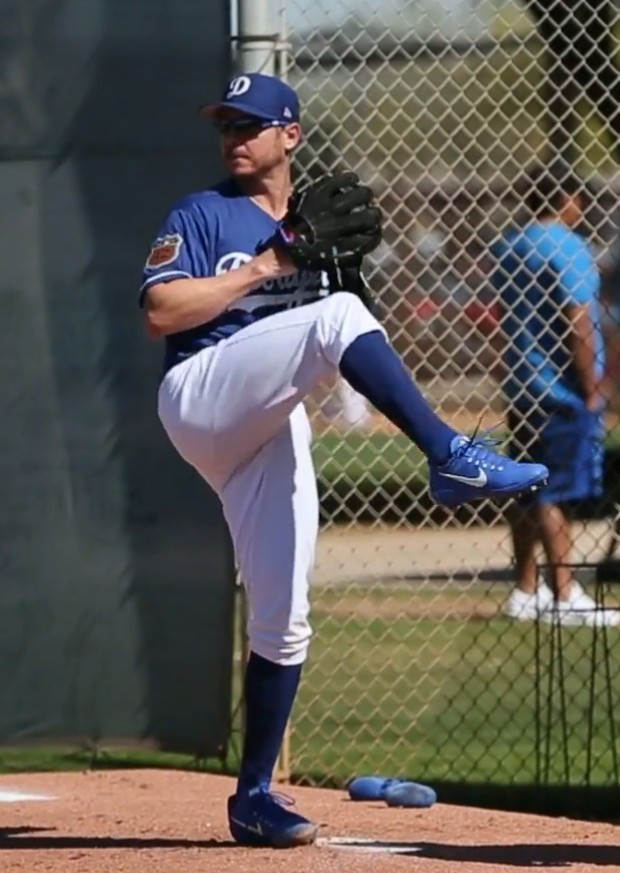
Kazmir pitching for the Los Angeles Dodgers in 2017

Coming into spring training, Kazmir continued to struggle with the hip and intercostal injuries which had affected his mechanics during the previous season. He continued to tinker with his mechanics in attempt to recover his fastball velocity, but it still topped out in the low-to-mid 80s. Continued ineffectiveness during spring training led to Kazmir again beginning the season on the disabled list. He continued to work on refining his delivery and hoped to rejoin the club at some point during the season, but continued discomfort after a minor league rehab appearance in late June caused him to be shut down again. He was sent home for a time in July to work with a body mechanics specialist in Houston.

Kazmir made four rehab appearances for the Class A+ Rancho Cucamonga Quakes in August and September, pitching to a 4.50 ERA in 12 innings of work. His pitch velocity had not increased, however, so the Dodgers decided not to add him to the major league roster for the end of the regular season or the team's playoff run to the 2017 World Series.

=== Atlanta Braves ===
==== 2018 season ====
On December 16, 2017, the Dodgers traded Kazmir, Charlie Culberson, Adrián González, Brandon McCarthy, and cash considerations to the Atlanta Braves for Matt Kemp. At the time of the trade, he was in the last year of his three-year contract, with $16 million remaining. His fastball velocity was sitting in the high-80s early in spring training, putting him in the running to be the Braves' fifth starter, but slipped back into the low-80s as the regular season approached. After being removed early from his final scheduled spring training start on March 24 due to a "fatigued arm", the Braves released Kazmir, making him a free agent.

=== Second comeback ===
Kazmir continued to work out and began a throwing program soon after his release by the Braves but commented that "it just didn’t turn out too well physically" and paused the workouts. While he did not retire, he did not seek to join a professional club during the 2018 or 2019 seasons and instead focused on his family life.

In January 2020, Kazmir expressed his desire to resume his baseball career and signed with the Eastern Reyes del Tigre, one of four teams in the Constellation Energy League, a Sugar Land Skeeters-developed summer league that played a limited schedule during the COVID-19 pandemic.

=== San Francisco Giants ===
==== 2021 season ====
On February 23, 2021, Kazmir signed a minor league contract with the San Francisco Giants and was invited to Major League Spring Training. On May 22, Kazmir was selected to the active roster and was named the starting pitcher against the Dodgers. He pitched four innings, taking the loss after allowing one run on two hits while striking out two batters. Kazmir recorded a 6.43 ERA across 3 appearances before being designated for assignment on June 5. The Giants sent him to the Triple-A Sacramento River Cats on June 11, though he soon left the minor league club when he was chosen as a member of the United States Olympic baseball team. On September 22, Kazmir was added back onto the Giants' 40-man roster and started later that night against the San Diego Padres.

In the 2021 regular season for the Giants, Kazmir was 0–1 with a 6.35 ERA and 10 strikeouts. He pitched 11 1/3 innings over 5 games (4 starts). For Triple–A Sacramento, he was 3–3 with a 4.61 ERA and 48 strikeouts. Kazmir pitched 52 2/3 innings over 13 games (12 starts).

== US Olympic Team ==
In July 2021 while pitching in the Giants' minor league system, Kazmir was selected to play on the United States national baseball team at the 2020 Summer Olympics, which were held in 2021 in Tokyo. Kazmir appeared in one game at the Olympics, starting against the Dominican Republic in the quarterfinals and pitching five scoreless innings to earn the win. Team USA team went on to win the silver medal, falling to Japan in the gold-medal game.

== Scouting report ==
When Kazmir was enjoying success during his first several seasons, his best pitches were a four-seam fastball and a slider. His fastball was regularly clocked in the mid to high 90s with excellent command, and his preferred strike-out pitch was his slider, which many scouts and other observers compared to that of Hall of Famer Steve Carlton. On the advice of Devil Rays teammate James Shields, he added a change-up, which also became an out pitch.

Repeated injuries followed by repeated attempts to tweak his mechanics and throwing motion saw Kazmir's entire repertoire dwindle in effectiveness. His fastball velocity dropped until topping out in the mid-80s in 2011, and he "lost his feel" for the slider, using it only sporadically and with poor results after his early 2008 stint on the disabled list.

In 2013, Kazmir returned to the major leagues with a modified slider that was thrown with less velocity than his pre-injury pitch, registering in the mid-80s. As the season progressed, his fastball velocity improved to the low 90s with a mix of four-seam and two-seam fastballs. Kazmir continued to throw a change-up in the low 80s and an occasional curve ball. By late in the 2016 season, his fastball velocity had slipped back down to the low 80s, decreasing the difference between the speed of his pitches and reducing his effectiveness.

== Personal life ==
Kazmir and his girlfriend have two sons together.

== Awards and accomplishments ==
- 3× Major League Baseball All-Star (2006, 2008, 2014)
- American League Pitcher of the Month (May 2008)
- 2× American League Player of the Week (May 21, 2006, September 16, 2007)
- American League strikeout leader (2007)
- Baseball America High School Player of the Year (2002)
- Member of the United States Junior Olympic baseball team (2001)
- Set a single-season record for strikeouts by high school pitchers in Texas with 175 for Cypress Falls High School (breaking the previous record of 172, set by Josh Beckett)
- Threw four consecutive no-hitters as a high school junior. While going for his fifth consecutive no-hitter he gave up a hit with two out in the seventh inning. After this, he finished the game, and subsequently pitched two more consecutive no-hitters.

== See also ==
- Houston Astros award winners and league leaders
- List of Olympic medalists in baseball
- List of people from Houston
- List of World Series starting pitchers

Sporting positions
Preceded by Dewon Brazelton	Tampa Bay Devil Rays; Opening Day starting pitcher 2006—2007	Succeeded by James Shields
Awards and achievements
Preceded by Cliff Lee; Chris Sale	American League Pitcher of the Month; May 2008; July 2015	Succeeded by John Lackey; Dallas Keuchel
