= Orber Moreno =

Venezuelan baseball player (born 1977)

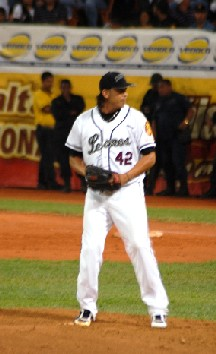
- Moreno in 2009
- Relief pitcher / Coach
- Born: April 27, 1977 (age 49); Caracas, Venezuela
- Batted: Right Threw: Right

MLB debut
- May 25, 1999, for the Kansas City Royals

Last MLB appearance
- July 21, 2004, for the New York Mets

MLB statistics
- Win–loss record: 3–1
- Earned run average: 4.44
- Strikeouts: 41
- Stats at Baseball Reference

Teams
- Kansas City Royals (1999); New York Mets (2003–2004)

Orber Aquiles Moreno Sulbarán (born April 27, 1977) is a Venezuelan former professional baseball relief pitcher. He played in Major League Baseball (MLB) for the Kansas City Royals and New York Mets in parts of three seasons spanning 1999–2004. Listed at 6 ft 3 in (1.91 m), 225 pounds (102 kg), Moreno batted and threw right-handed.

== Playing career ==
Moreno threw a sharp slider, a changeup and a cutter, but had a good command of his low-90s fastball. He made his majors debut in the 1999 season, ranking as one of the top Royals prospects, but he injured his arm in an off-field accident and aggravated it by pitching.

Moreno had surgery performed and rehabbed at Triple-A in 2002, but then he showed up out of shape from the long layoff and was released. Soon after that, he signed with the Mets, pitching for them from 2003 to 2004.

In between, Moreno pitched 12 years in the Minor Leagues, including stints with the Diablos Rojos del México, Dorados de Chihuahua and Tigres de Quintana Roo of the Mexican League, and for the Leones del Caracas club of the Venezuelan Winter League during 12 seasons from 1996 to 2013.

== Coaching career ==
On January 6, 2026, Moreno was hired to serve as the pitching coach for the Saraperos de Saltillo of the Mexican League.

== See also ==
- List of Major League Baseball players from Venezuela
