= Sam McConnell =

American baseball player (born 1975)

- Pitcher
- Born: December 31, 1975 (age 50); Middletown, Ohio
- Batted: Left Threw: Left

MLB debut
- June 25, 2004, for the Atlanta Braves

Last MLB appearance
- July 27, 2004, for the Atlanta Braves

MLB statistics
- Win–loss record: 1–0
- Earned run average: 3.86
- Strikeouts: 4
- Stats at Baseball Reference

Teams
- Atlanta Braves (2004)

John Samuel McConnell (born December 31, 1975) is an American former professional baseball pitcher. He played in Major League Baseball (MLB) for the Atlanta Braves during the 2004 season.

McConnell attended Ball State University, and in 1996 he played collegiate summer baseball with the Harwich Mariners of the Cape Cod Baseball League.

He was selected by the Pittsburgh Pirates in the 11th round of the 1997 MLB draft. McConnell played his first professional season with their Single-A Augusta GreenJackets, Single-A Advanced Lynchburg Hillcats, and Double-A Carolina Mudcats in 1998. McConnell was released by the Pirates during spring training 2002, and signed with the Philadelphia Phillies the next day. After one year in the Phillies organization, he signed with the Atlanta Braves on November 12, 2002, and played his last affiliated season for Atlanta's Triple-A Richmond Braves in 2005. His last professional season was with the Somerset Patriots of the independent Atlantic League in 2006.
