= Bartolomé Fortunato =

Dominican baseball player (born 1974)

- Pitcher
- Born: August 24, 1974 (age 51); Santo Domingo, Dominican Republic
- Batted: Right Threw: Right

MLB debut
- June 29, 2004, for the Tampa Bay Devil Rays

Last MLB appearance
- May 7, 2006, for the New York Mets

MLB statistics
- Win–loss record: 2–0
- Earned run average: 6.21
- Strikeouts: 25
- Stats at Baseball Reference

Former teams
- Tampa Bay Devil Rays (2004); New York Mets (2004, 2006)

Bartolomé Araujo Fortunato (born August 24, 1974) is a Dominican former professional baseball pitcher.

Fortunato was originally an outfielder, but was converted to pitching when signed as a free agent by the Tampa Bay Devil Rays in 1999. He made his Major League debut on June 29, 2004, against the Toronto Blue Jays.

Fortunato was traded to the New York Mets along with Victor Zambrano as part of a controversial deal that sent top Mets prospect Scott Kazmir to Tampa Bay. After pitching well late in 2004, he spent the entire 2005 season on the disabled list with a herniated disc. After signing with the San Francisco Giants in spring training 2008, Fortunato was released by the Giants on June 15.

On July 6, 2008, Fortunato signed with the Calgary Vipers of the Golden Baseball League. On July 10, the Vipers traded him to the St. George Roadrunners for a PTBNL. On August 23, 2010 Fortunato signed with the Bridgeport Bluefish. He last played for the Edmonton Capitals of the North American League.

Fortunato is single and resides in Santo Domingo.
