= Joe Hietpas =

American baseball player (born 1979)

- Catcher
- Born: May 1, 1979 (age 45); Appleton, Wisconsin, U.S.
- Batted: Right Threw: Right

MLB debut
- October 3, 2004, for the New York Mets

Last MLB appearance
- October 3, 2004, for the New York Mets

MLB statistics
- Games played: 1
- At Bats: 0
- Stats at Baseball Reference

Teams
- New York Mets (2004)

Joseph Carl Hietpas (born May 1, 1979) is a United States former Major League Baseball player. Hietpas attended Northwestern University, Illinois.

In 2004, Hietpas was called up to the New York Mets once the roster expanded in September. He suffered an injury during batting practice one day, which forced him to be able to only play in one game, October 3, 2004, against the Montreal Expos. He came into the game as a ninth inning substitute for Todd Zeile. Because the Mets won the game, 8–1, the bottom half of the final inning was never played, and Hietpas did not receive an at-bat. In that game, he was a catcher, but after the 2006 season, converted to pitcher.

In 2007, he appeared in 27 games and had a 2.47 ERA for the High-A St. Lucie Mets. Hietpas played his final season of baseball for the Double-A Binghamton Mets in 2008. He later became a real estate lawyer based in St. Louis, Missouri.
