= Aaron Heilman =

American baseball player (born 1978)

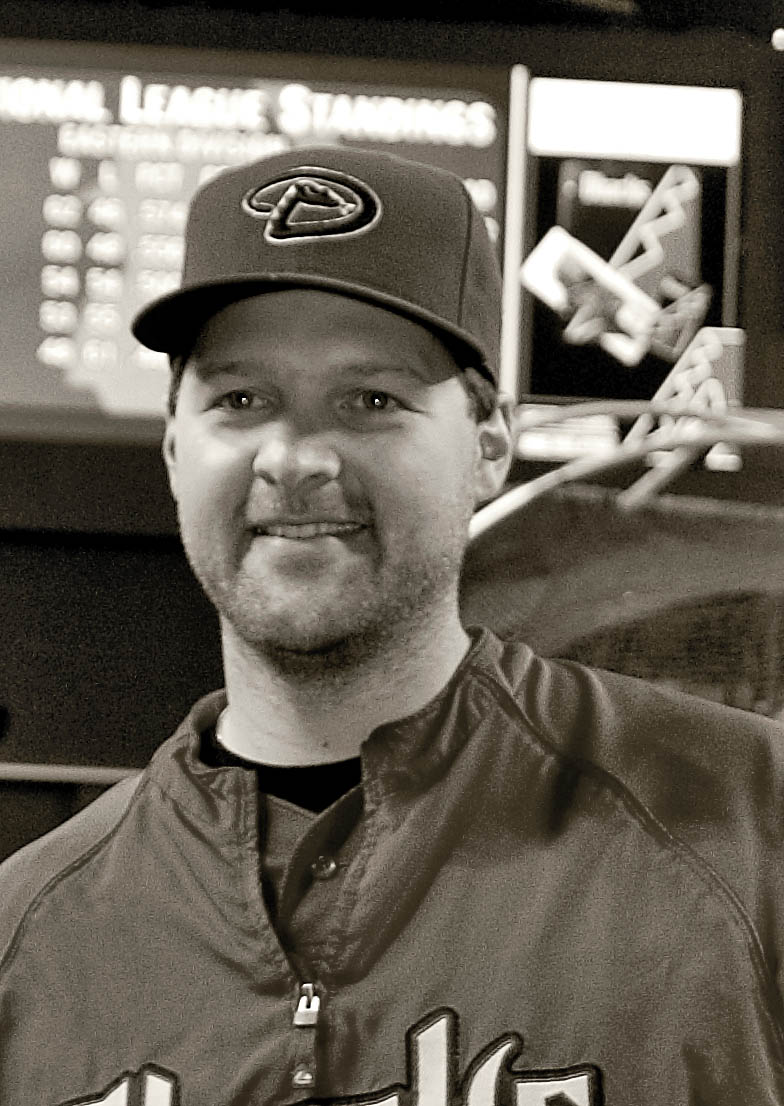
- Heilman with the Arizona Diamondbacks
- Pitcher
- Born: November 12, 1978 (age 48); Logansport, Indiana, U.S.
- Batted: Right Threw: Right

MLB debut
- June 26, 2003, for the New York Mets

Last MLB appearance
- July 15, 2011, for the Arizona Diamondbacks

MLB statistics
- Win–loss record: 35–46
- Earned run average: 4.40
- Strikeouts: 548
- Stats at Baseball Reference

Teams
- New York Mets (2003–2008); Chicago Cubs (2009); Arizona Diamondbacks (2010–2011)

Aaron Michael Heilman (born November 12, 1978) is an American former professional baseball pitcher. He played in Major League Baseball (MLB) for the New York Mets, Chicago Cubs, and Arizona Diamondbacks.

== Early life ==
Heilman was born in Logansport, Indiana and attended Logansport High School, where he was a letterman in baseball. As a senior, he was a team M.V.P. and an All-State selection. Heilman graduated from Logansport High School in 1997.

== College career ==
After a successful college career at the University of Notre Dame, he was selected by the New York Mets in the first round of the 2001 amateur draft with the 18th overall pick. Heilman was a management information systems and philosophy major in the Mendoza College of Business at the University of Notre Dame.

He was drafted by the New York Yankees in the 55th round of the 1997 Major League Baseball draft and by the Minnesota Twins in the first round (31st overall) of the 2000 Major League Baseball draft, but did not sign either for either team.

== Professional career ==
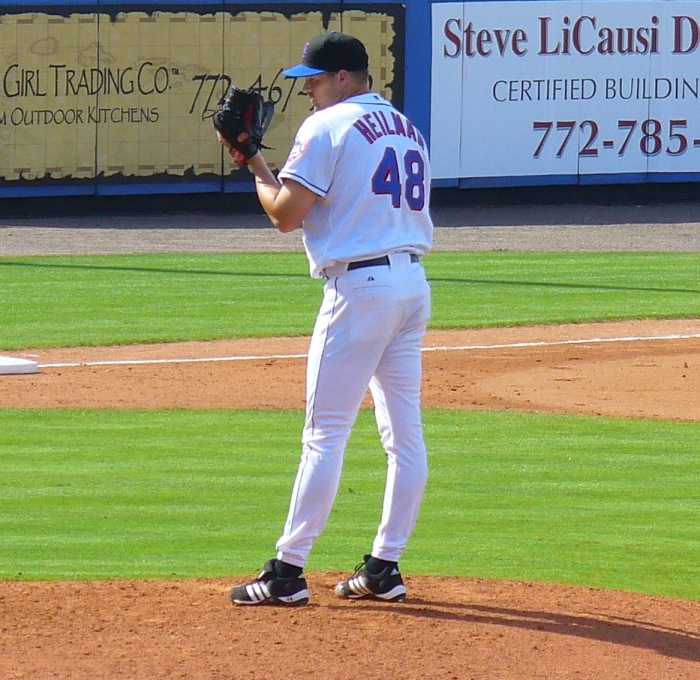
Heilman while with the Mets.

=== New York Mets ===
Heilman was selected by the Mets in the first round (18th overall) of the 2001 Major League Baseball draft. He signed and made his professional debut that year with the Class-A Advanced St. Lucie Mets. He pitched for the Double-A Binghamton Mets and Triple-A Norfolk Tides in 2002, and began the 2003 season with the Tides.

Heilman made his major league debut at Shea Stadium on June 26, 2003, in a 6–1 loss to the Florida Marlins. He posted an earned run average of 5.93 as a starter for 2003, 2004 and the beginning of 2005. Heilman's finest game came as a starter on April 15, 2005, when he made a start in place of the injured Kris Benson and pitched a one-hit complete game shutout. However, he was converted to a relief pitcher for the rest of 2005 and excelled with an ERA of only 2.18. In the second half of the 2005 season, he held a 0.68 ERA, leading the league.

In Game 7 of the 2006 National League Championship Series, Heilman surrendered a tie-breaking, two-run home run in the top of the ninth inning to Yadier Molina of the St. Louis Cardinals, putting St. Louis ahead 3–1. St. Louis would hold on to the lead to win the National League pennant, while Heilman suffered the loss for the Mets.

=== Seattle Mariners ===
After a dismal 2008 season, Heilman was traded to the Seattle Mariners in a three team trade for J. J. Putz.

=== Chicago Cubs ===
On January 28, 2009, the Mariners traded him to the Chicago Cubs for Ronny Cedeño and Garrett Olson.

=== Arizona Diamondbacks ===
On November 19, 2009, Heilman was acquired by the Diamondbacks, in return for Scott Maine and Ryne White. He elected free agency on November 7, 2010.

He re-signed with them on January 18, 2011. He was expected to compete for a spot in the starting rotation. He was released on July 19, 2011.

=== Philadelphia Phillies ===
The Phillies signed a minor league contract with Heilman on July 22, 2011. He was assigned to the Triple-A Lehigh Valley IronPigs. He was released on August 20, 2011.

=== Pittsburgh Pirates ===
Heilman signed a minor league contract with the Pittsburgh Pirates on August 21, 2011, and was assigned to the Triple-A Indianapolis Indians. He elected free agency on November 2, 2011.

=== Seattle Mariners ===
Heilman signed a minor league contract with the Seattle Mariners on January 10, 2012, with an invite to Spring Training. He was released on April 1.

=== Texas Rangers ===
Heilman signed a minor league deal with the Texas Rangers on April 4, 2012, and was assigned to the Triple-A Round Rock Express. He elected free agency on November 2, 2012.
