= Román Colón =

Dominican baseball player (born 1979)

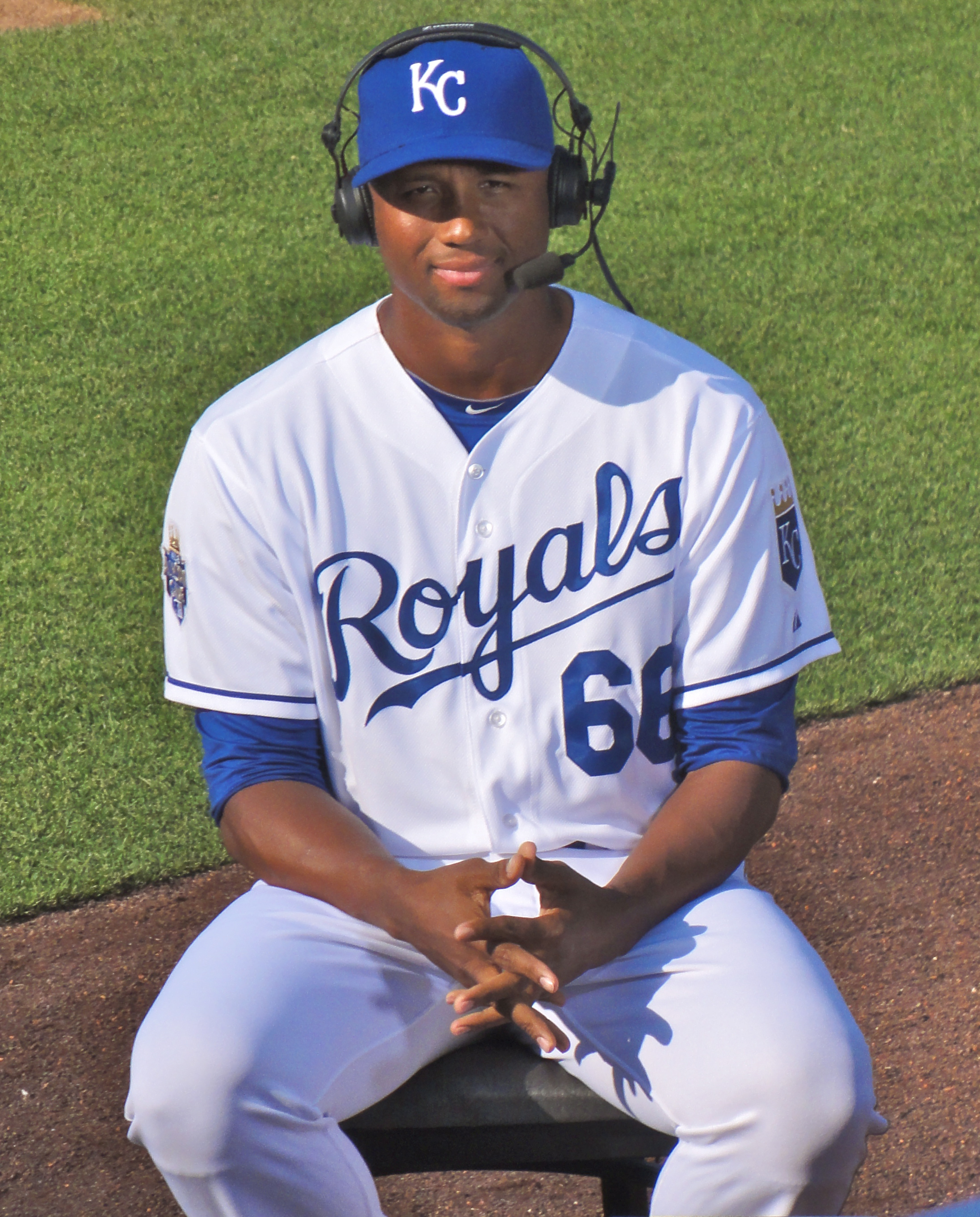
- Colón with the Kansas City Royals
- Pitcher
- Born: August 13, 1979 (age 47); Monte Cristi, Dominican Republic
- Batted: Right Threw: Right

Professional debut
- MLB: August 21, 2004, for the Atlanta Braves
- KBO: 2010, for the Kia Tigers
- CPBL: March 30, 2014, for the Chinatrust Brothers

Last appearance
- MLB: June 22, 2012, for the Kansas City Royals
- KBO: 2010, for the Kia Tigers
- CPBL: June 4, 2014, for the Chinatrust Brothers

MLB statistics
- Win–loss record: 8–10
- Earned run average: 5.19
- Strikeouts: 120

KBO statistics
- Win–loss record: 8–7
- Earned run average: 3.91
- Strikeouts: 57

CPBL statistics
- Win–loss record: 2–4
- Earned run average: 2.52
- Strikeouts: 14
- Stats at Baseball Reference

Teams
- Atlanta Braves (2004–2005); Detroit Tigers (2005–2006); Kansas City Royals (2009–2010); Kia Tigers (2010); Kansas City Royals (2012); Chinatrust Brothers (2014)

Román Benedicto Colón (born August 13, 1979) is a Dominican former professional baseball pitcher. He played in Major League Baseball (MLB) for the Atlanta Braves, Detroit Tigers, and Kansas City Royals. He also played in the KBO League for the Kia Tigers and in the Chinese Professional Baseball League (CPBL) for the Chinatrust Brothers. He is 6 feet 6 inches (198 cm) tall and weighs 245 pounds (111 kg), and bats and throws right-handed.

== Professional career ==
=== Atlanta Braves ===
Colón was signed as an amateur free agent by the Atlanta Braves in 1995 and began his professional career with the Dominican Summer League Braves in 1996. In 1997, he ranked first in the Gulf Coast League in runs allowed (47) and earned runs (30), 5th in innings pitched (63), 4th in hits allowed (68), 2nd in games started (12). In 1998, he ranked 3rd in the Appalachian League in runs (59) and games started (13), 4th in earned runs (47) and first in hits allowed (92) and losses (7).

In 1999, Colón was named by the organization as the Jamestown Jammers's Pitcher of the Year. He led the team in wins and strikeouts and tied for the team lead in innings pitched. Colón missed all of 2000 with an injury. Healthy again in 2001, he was promoted to the Macon Braves on May 3 from extended spring training. He had the 9th best walks per 9 innings ratio in Macon history (1.83) and struck out a season high 7 batters three times. He struck out 6 in 6 innings on May 18 against the Asheville Tourists for his first win of the season.

Colón put together a solid season in 2002, going 9–8 with a 3.59 ERA. In the two seasons after his arm trouble, he walked just 64 batters in 291 innings with 185 strikeouts. Colón pitched a complete game on June 2 versus the Frederick Keys (9 IP, 7 H, 1 R, 1 ER, 6 K). He also struck out a season-high eight batters on May 6 against the Winston-Salem Warthogs (7 1/3 IP, 6 H, 1 R, 0 ER, 1 BB, 8 K).

In 2003, Colón was named Greenville Braves Pitcher of the Month in April (2–0, 2.86 ERA in 4 G). He finished 1st on the club and 3rd in the Double–A Southern League in wins, going 11–3. Colón earned a win in his first Double–A start in a 3–1 victory against the Chattanooga Lookouts on April 9 (5 IP, 3 H, 1 R, 3 BB, 4 K). He won his first 3 decisions before losing back to back starts on May 12 and May 17, giving up 8 runs on 16 hits over 12 innings. He went 6–3 (3.66) in 12 starts (71 1/3 IP, 68 H, 22 BB, 38 K) and was 5–0 (2.78) with 2 saves in 27 relief appearances (35 2/3 IP, 36 H, 11 BB, 20 K). However, Colón closed the season by winning his final 7 decisions (did not lose after May 29) and did not allow a run over his final 13 appearances of the season from August 1 through September 1. He earned his first professional save by firing a perfect inning in a 5–3 win at Jacksonville on July 23.

Colón pitched at three different levels in 2004 and ended the year with Atlanta. With the Triple–A Richmond Braves, he went 4–1 with a 3.65 ERA in 51 appearances and was Richmond Pitcher of the Month for July, going 2–0 with a 1.33 ERA (12G, 20 1/3 IP, 3 ER, BB, 17 K). Colón walked just two batters after July 1 with Richmond (19 G, 31 1/3 IP) and did not allow a run over his last six appearances, from August 4 to August 17 (10 2/3 IP, 2 H, BB, 11 K). He was recalled by Atlanta on August 18 and made his major league debut August 21 against the Los Angeles Dodgers, pitching the eighth inning. Colón did not allow a hit and fanned two. He earned first career win on August 30 versus the San Francisco Giants with a scoreless ninth inning. Colón suffered his first MLB loss on September 9 against the Philadelphia Phillies. Colón had filled in admirably in an injury depleted Braves rotation in 2005, holding the Chicago Cubs to one run in seven innings on July 5.

=== Detroit Tigers ===
The Detroit Tigers acquired Colón from the Braves (along with Zach Miner) in exchange for Kyle Farnsworth at the July 31, 2005, trade deadline. He spent most of his Tigers tenure in the bullpen before making two spot starts in September, and was shelved after that with stiffness in his throwing elbow. In 2006, he appeared in 20 games for the Tigers.

Colón started the 2007 season on the disabled list. During a rehab assignment with the Triple–A Toledo Mud Hens, he was involved in an altercation with fellow pitcher Jordan Tata. During the course of the fight, Colón attempted to punch Tata and instead landed a punch to the face of Jason Karnuth, the Mud Hens closer who was trying to intercede and break up the fight. The resulting injury caused Karnuth to be admitted to the hospital and undergo plastic surgery to his face. According to his wife, who filed an assault report against Colón on her husband's behalf, Karnuth required a titanium plate to be screwed into his head. Karnuth missed most of the 2007 season as a result of the injuries. The Tigers suspended Colón for 7 days after the incident. On January 15, 2008, Colón pleaded no contest to an assault charge and was sentenced to 200 hours of community service.

=== Kansas City Royals ===
Colón was traded to the Kansas City Royals on July 13, 2007, for a player to be named later (minor league pitcher Daniel Christensen). He was outrighted to the minor leagues after the season and was invited to spring training in 2008. He became a free agent after the 2008 season, but was re-signed by the Royals and invited to their 2009 spring training. He pitched in 48 Major League games with the Royals in 2009 and 2010, finishing 2–3 with a 4.83 ERA.

=== Kia Tigers ===
Colón signed with Kia Tigers of the KBO League on May 5, 2010. He made 21 starts for the Tigers, compiling a 8–7 record and 3.91 ERA with 57 strikeouts across 103 2/3 innings pitched.

=== Los Angeles Dodgers ===
On January 12, 2011, Colón signed a minor league contract with the Los Angeles Dodgers, which included an invitation to spring training. He was assigned to the Triple–A Albuquerque Isotopes. He appeared in 26 games, posting a 2–1 record and 4.85 ERA with 17 strikeouts for the Isotopes.

=== Kansas City Royals (second stint) ===
Colón signed a minor league contract with the Kansas City Royals on January 25, 2012, and received an invitation to spring training. He was selected to the Royals' active roster on June 14. In 3 games for Kansas City, he compiled a 6.75 ERA with 3 strikeouts over 8 innings pitched. Colón was designated for assignment following the promotion of Francisley Bueno on June 23. He cleared waivers and was sent outright to the Triple–A Omaha Storm Chasers on June 25. On October 6, Colón elected free agency.

=== Pittsburgh Pirates ===
On 16 February 2013, Colón signed a minor league contract with the Pittsburgh Pirates organization. He made one appearance for the Triple–A Indianapolis Indians, allowing one run in 1/3 of an inning.

=== Atlanta Braves (second stint) ===
On 24 April 2013, Colón was traded to the Atlanta Braves in exchange for cash considerations. In 6 appearances for the Triple–A Gwinnett Braves, Colón struggled to a 6.23 ERA with 8 strikeouts over 13 innings of work.

=== Colorado Rockies ===
On May 18, 2013, Colón was traded to the Colorado Rockies in exchange for cash considerations. He made 2 starts for the Triple–A Colorado Springs Sky Sox, allowing 7 unearned runs in 5 2/3 innings pitched. Colón elected free agency following the season on November 4.

=== Chinatrust Brothers ===
In 2014, Colón played for the Chinatrust Brothers of the Chinese Professional Baseball League. In 15 games (2 starts) for the Brothers, Colón compiled a 2–4 record and 2.52 ERA with 14 strikeouts and 3 saves across 25 innings pitched.

=== Kansas City Royals (third stint) ===
On December 22, 2014, Colón signed a minor league contract with the Kansas City Royals. After not appearing for the organization in 2015, he re–signed with the Royals on a new minor league contract on November 26, 2015. Colón did not appear for the Royals organization in 2016, and once more re–signed with Kansas City on November 13, 2016.

== Personal life ==
He resides in the Dominican Republic.
