= Joselo Díaz =

Dominican baseball player (born 1980)

- Relief pitcher
- Born: April 13, 1980 (age 45); San Pedro de Macorís, Dominican Republic
- Batted: Right Threw: Right

Professional debut
- MLB: September 6, 2006, for the Kansas City Royals
- NPB: April 1, 2007, for the Yokohama BayStars

Last appearance
- NPB: September 7, 2007, for the Yokohama BayStars
- MLB: July 12, 2008, for the Texas Rangers

MLB statistics
- Win–loss record: 0–0
- Earned run average: 9.39
- Strikeouts: 5

NPB statistics
- Win–loss record: 3–4
- Earned run average: 4.59
- Strikeouts: 61
- Stats at Baseball Reference

Teams
- Kansas City Royals (2006); Yokohama BayStars (2007); Texas Rangers (2008)

Joselo Soriano Díaz (born April 13, 1980) is a Dominican former Major League Baseball pitcher. He has played in MLB for the Kansas City Royals, Texas Rangers and in Nippon Professional Baseball for the Yokohama BayStars.

== Career ==
At the age of 16, Díaz was signed by the Los Angeles Dodgers as a non-drafted free agent. Seven years later, on July 14, 2003, he found himself traded by Los Angeles to the New York Mets organization. He was subsequently dealt, along with starting pitcher Scott Kazmir, to the Tampa Bay Devil Rays at the 2004 non-waiver trading deadline.

Continuing to move from team to team, the right-hander was waived by Tampa Bay in 2005 and claimed by the Cleveland Indians on June 7. Again, he did not break into the major leagues, and he became a free agent after season's end. He moved on to the Texas Rangers organization, signing with Texas in January 2006.

Díaz received an opportunity when he was dealt to Kansas City in another deadline deal, this time on July 31, 2006, for outfielder-designated hitter Matt Stairs. Weeks later, he received a call-up with the Royals and made his major league debut on September 6 against the New York Yankees at Kauffman Stadium in Kansas City. In October, Díaz became a free agent.

After playing 2007 for the Yokohama BayStars in Japan's Central League, Díaz signed a minor league deal with the Mets on January 7, 2008. Díaz started the season with the New Orleans Zephyrs, then returned to the Rangers organization during the season. He was called up to the majors on July 11, and made his Rangers debut the following day in a game against the Chicago White Sox. He was designated for assignment on July 18, after just one appearance.

On March 10, 2011, he signed a contract with the Long Island Ducks.
