= Kevin Gryboski =

American baseball player (born 1973)

- Relief pitcher
- Born: November 15, 1973 (age 52); Wilkes-Barre, Pennsylvania, U.S.
- Batted: Left Threw: Right

MLB debut
- April 13, 2002, for the Atlanta Braves

Last MLB appearance
- August 29, 2006, for the Washington Nationals

MLB statistics
- Win–loss record: 12–8
- Earned run average: 4.07
- Strikeouts: 103
- Stats at Baseball Reference

Teams
- Atlanta Braves (2002–2005); Texas Rangers (2005); Washington Nationals (2006)

Kevin John Gryboski (born November 15, 1973) is an American former Major League Baseball pitcher and former head coach of Wilkes University's baseball team.

== Career ==
=== High school career ===
At Bishop Hoban High School in Wilkes-Barre, Pennsylvania, Gryboski was a two-sport star in both baseball and basketball. In baseball, he was an All-Conference All-Star pick.

=== College career ===
Gryboski pitched and also played basketball for 2 years at Wilkes University in Wilkes-Barre, Pennsylvania.

=== Professional career ===
Gryboski was selected by the Seattle Mariners in the 16th round of the 1995 Major League Baseball draft.

Gryboski, a right-handed pitcher, was acquired by the Atlanta Braves in January 2002 and traded to the Texas Rangers in July 2005 for minor league pitcher Matt Lorenzo. Gryboski was known as "Groundball" Gryboski while playing with the Braves; this came from his ability to get batters to ground into double plays.

=== Coaching ===
In 2018, Gryboski became of head coach of the Wilkes University Colonels baseball team.

== Personal life ==
Gryboski is married to Leah and they have two children: KJ and Kaylee.
