= 2004 Montreal Expos season =

2004 Montreal Expos
- League: National League
- Division: East
- Ballpark: Olympic Stadium (60 games) and Estadio Hiram Bithorn (21 games)
- City: Montreal, Canada and San Juan, Puerto Rico
- Record: 67–95 (.414)
- Divisional place: 5th
- Owners: Major League Baseball
- General managers: Omar Minaya
- Managers: Frank Robinson
- Television: Réseau des sports (Rodger Brulotte, Denis Casavant); SCORE TV (Sam Cosentino, Darrin Fletcher, Brett Dolan, Rance Mulliniks, Joe Block)
- Radio: CKGM (AM) (Mitch Melnick, Elliott Price, guest play-by-play broadcasters) CKAC (AM) (Jacques Doucet, Marc Griffin)

The 2004 Montreal Expos season was the 36th and final Major League Baseball (MLB) season for the Montreal Expos franchise competing under that name and being based in Canada. The team competed as members of the National League East. The Expos played most of their home games at Olympic Stadium in Montreal, while also playing 21 home games at Estadio Hiram Bithorn in San Juan, Puerto Rico.

The Expos finished in fifth and last place in their division, with a 67–95 record, 29 games behind the first-place Atlanta Braves. After the season, the team—which had played in Montreal since its founding as part of the 1969 MLB expansion—relocated to Washington, D.C., and became the Washington Nationals, as MLB returned to Washington for the 2005 season after a 33-season absence.

== Offseason ==
- December 16, 2003: The Expos traded Javier Vázquez to the New York Yankees for Nick Johnson, Randy Choate, and Juan Rivera.
- January 6, 2004: The Expos signed Tony Batista as a free agent.
- January 8, 2004: The Expos signed Luis Lopez as a free agent.

== Spring training ==
The Expos held spring training at Space Coast Stadium in Viera, Florida, in 2004. It was their second year of spring training at the facility.

== Regular season ==
=== Opening Day lineup ===
Opening Day Starters
Name	Position
Peter Bergeron	Center fielder
José Vidro	Second baseman
Carl Everett	Right fielder
Orlando Cabrera	Shortstop
Brad Wilkerson	First baseman
Tony Batista	Third baseman
Termel Sledge	Left fielder
Brian Schneider	Catcher
Liván Hernández	Starting pitcher

=== Season standings ===
==== National League East ====
NL East
Team	W	L	Pct.	GB	Home	Road
Atlanta Braves	96	66	.593	—	49‍–‍32	47‍–‍34
Philadelphia Phillies	86	76	.531	10	42‍–‍39	44‍–‍37
Florida Marlins	83	79	.512	13	42‍–‍38	41‍–‍41
New York Mets	71	91	.438	25	38‍–‍43	33‍–‍48
Montreal Expos	67	95	.414	29	35‍–‍45	32‍–‍50

==== Record vs. opponents ====
2004 National League record Source: MLB Standings Grid – 2004
Team	AZ	ATL	CHC	CIN	COL	FLA	HOU	LAD	MIL	MON	NYM	PHI	PIT	SD	SF	STL	AL
Arizona	—	2–4	4–2	3–3	6–13	3–4	2–4	3–16	3–3	0–6	3–4	1–5	2–4	7–12	5–14	1–5	6–12
Atlanta	4–2	—	3–3	2–4	4–2	14–5	3–3	4–3	4–2	15–4	12–7	10–9	4–2	3–3	4–3	2–4	8–10
Chicago	2–4	3–3	—	9–8	5–1	3–3	10–9	2–4	10–7	3–3	4–2	3–3	13–5	4–2	2–4	8–11	8–4
Cincinnati	3–3	4–2	8–9	—	3–3	4–2	6–11	4–2	10–8	4–2	3–3	3–3	9–10	2–4	3–3	5–14	5-7
Colorado	13–6	2–4	1–5	3–3	—	1–5	1–5	8–11	2–4	2–4	1–5	5–3	2–4	10–9	8–11	1–5	8–10
Florida	4–3	5–14	3–3	2–4	5–1	—	3–3	3–3	4–2	11–8	15–4	12–7	1–5	4–2	2–5	2–4	7–11
Houston	4–2	3–3	9–10	11–6	5–1	3-3	—	1–5	13–6	2–4	2–4	6–0	12–5	2–4	2–4	10–8	7–5
Los Angeles	16–3	3–4	4–2	2–4	11–8	3–3	5–1	—	3–3	4–3	3–3	1–5	6–0	10–9	10–9	2–4	10–8
Milwaukee	3–3	2–4	7–10	8–10	4–2	2–4	6–13	3–3	—	5–1	2–4	0–6	6–12	2–4	1–5	8–9	8–4
Montreal	6–0	4–15	3–3	2–4	4–2	8-11	4–2	3–4	1–5	—	9–10	7–12	4–2	1–6	1–5	3–3	7–11
New York	4–3	7–12	2–4	3–3	5–1	4–15	4–2	3–3	4–2	10–9	—	8–11	1–5	1–6	4–2	1–5	10–8
Philadelphia	5-1	9–10	3–3	3–3	3–5	7–12	0–6	5–1	6–0	12–7	11–8	—	3–3	5–1	2–4	3–3	9–9
Pittsburgh	4–2	2–4	5–13	10–9	4–2	5–1	5–12	0–6	12–6	2–4	5–1	3–3	—	3–3	5–1	5–12	2–10
San Diego	12–7	3–3	2–4	4–2	9–10	2–4	4–2	9–10	4–2	6–1	6–1	1–5	3–3	—	12–7	2–4	8–10
San Francisco	14–5	3–4	4–2	3–3	11–8	5–2	4–2	9–10	5–1	5–1	2–4	4–2	1–5	7–12	—	3–3	11–7
St. Louis	5–1	4–2	11–8	14–5	5–1	4-2	8–10	4–2	9–8	3–3	5–1	3–3	12–5	4–2	3–3	—	11–1

Expos vs. American League
Team	AL Central						
Team	CLE	CWS	DET	KC	MIN	SEA	TOR
**Montreal**	—	2–1	—	2–1	0–3	0–3	3–3

=== Game log ===
Legend
	Expos win
	Expos loss
	Postponement
**Bold**	Expos team member

2004 game log
April (5–19)

#	Date	Opponent	Score	Win	Loss	Save	Attendance	Stadium	Record
1	April 6	@ Marlins	3–4	Perisho (1–0)	**Ayala** (0–1)	Benítez (1)	55,315	Pro Player Stadium	0–1
2	April 7	@ Marlins	3–2	**Vargas** (1–0)	Penny (0–1)	**Biddle** (1)	17,622	Pro Player Stadium	1–1
3	April 8	@ Marlins	0–3	Willis (1–0)	**Ohka** (0–1)	Benítez (2)	18,121	Pro Player Stadium	1–2
4	April 9	vs. Mets @ San Juan, PR (Note: Games the Montreal Expos played at Hiram Bithorn Stadium in San Juan, Puerto Rico, during the 2004 season counted as Expos home games.)	2–3 (11)	Weathers (1–0)	**Ayala** (0–2)	Moreno (1)	14,739	Hiram Bithorn Stadium	1–3
5	April 10	vs. Mets @ San Juan, PR	1-0	**Patterson** (1–0)	Seo (0–1)	**Biddle** (2)	11,957	Hiram Bithorn Stadium	2–3
6	April 11	vs. Mets @ San Juan, PR	1–4	Glavine (1–0)	**Hernández** (0–1)	Looper (2)	10,623	Hiram Bithorn Stadium	2–4
7	April 13	vs. Marlins @ San Juan, PR	0–5	Penny (1-1)	**Vargas** (1-1)		14,620	Hiram Bithorn Stadium	2–5
8	April 14	vs. Marlins @ San Juan, PR	0–9	Willis (2–0)	**Ohka** (0–2)		13,180	Hiram Bithorn Stadium	2–6
9	April 15	vs. Marlins @ San Juan, PR	0–3	Pavano (1–0)	**Day** (0–1)	Benítez (6)	8,494	Hiram Bithorn Stadium	2–7
10	April 16	@ Phillies	2–4	Milton (1–0)	**Hernández** (0–2)	Wagner (3)	39,613	Citizens Bank Park	2–8
11	April 17	@ Phillies	3–6	Millwood (1–2)	**Patterson** (1-1)	Wagner (4)	42,931	Citizens Bank Park	2–9
12	April 18	@ Phillies	4–5	Wagner (1–0)	**Biddle** (0–1)		43,791	Citizens Bank Park	2–10
13	April 19	@ Mets	1–4	Yates (1-1)	**Ohka** (0–3)	Looper (3)	14,002	Shea Stadium	2–11
14	April 20	@ Mets	2–1	**Day** (1-1)	Weathers (1-1)	**Biddle** (3)	14,513	Shea Stadium	3–11
15	April 21	@ Mets	2–1	**Hernández** (1–2)	Glavine (2–1)	**Biddle** (4)	23,565	Shea Stadium	4–11
16	April 22	@ Mets	2–3	Trachsel (2-2)	**Bentz** (0–1)	Looper (4)	15,062	Shea Stadium	4–12
17	April 23	Phillies	6–8	Millwood (2-2)	**Bentz** (0–2)	Wagner (5)	30,112	Olympic Stadium	4–13
18	April 24	Phillies	0–7	Wolf (1-1)	**Ohka** (0–4)		6,899	Olympic Stadium	4–14
19	April 25	Phillies	2–0	**Day** (2–1)	Padilla (0–3)	**Biddle** (5)	8,267	Olympic Stadium	5–14
20	April 26	@ Padres	2–3	Otsuka (1-1)	**Ayala** (1-1)		25,438	Petco Park	5–15
21	April 27	@ Padres	0–3	Valdez (3–0)	**Patterson** (1–2)	Hoffman (4)	25,473	Petco Park	5–16
22	April 28	@ Padres	4–5	Osuna (1–0)	**Ayala** (0–4)	Hoffman (5)	24,079	Petco Park	5–17
23	April 29	@ Padres	1–2	Wells (1–2)	**Ohka** (0–5)	Hoffman (6)	21,689	Petco Park	5–18
24	April 30	@ Dodgers	4–13	Ishii (4–1)	**Day** (2–2)		54,958	Dodger Stadium	5–19

May (11–15)

#	Date	Opponent	Score	Win	Loss	Save	Attendance	Stadium	Record
25	May 1	@ Dodgers	4–5	Mota (1–0)	**Ayala** (0–5)	Gagné (7)	52,900	Dodger Stadium	5–20
26	May 2	@ Dodgers	6–4	**Kim** (1–0)	Nomo (3–3)		35,351	Dodger Stadium	6–20
27	May 4	Rockies	10–4	**Vargas** (2–1)	Jennings (1–4)		4,001	Olympic Stadium	7–20
28	May 5	Rockies	0–2	Kennedy (4–0)	**Day** (2–3)	Chacón (7)	3,609	Olympic Stadium	7–21
29	May 6	Rockies	3–1	**Hernández** (2–2)	Elarton (0–5)		8,851	Olympic Stadium	8–21
30	May 7	Cardinals	5–2	**Kim** (2–0)	Morris (3–3)	**Biddle** (6)	5,332	Olympic Stadium	9–21
31	May 8	Cardinals	2–0	**Ohka** (1–5)	Marquis (1–3)	**Biddle** (7)	5,611	Olympic Stadium	10–21
32	May 9	Cardinals	2–5	Carpenter (3–1)	**Vargas** (2–2)	Isringhausen (5)	12,301	Olympic Stadium	10–22
33	May 11	@ Brewers	5-8 (14)	Burba (3–0)	**Tucker** (0–1)		10,761	Miller Park	10–23
34	May 12	@ Brewers	3-4	Obermueller (2–1)	**Day** (2–4)	Kolb (7)	10,803	Miller Park	10–24
35	May 13	@ Brewers	4-7	Davis (3–2)	**Kim** (2–18)	Kolb (8)	14,972	Miller Park	10–25
36	May 14	@ Diamondbacks	4-3	**Cordero** (1–0)	Valverde (0–1)	**Biddle** (8)	27,188	Bank One Ballpark	11–25
37	May 15	@ Diamondbacks	5-0	**Vargas** (3–2)	Daigle (2-2)		32,379	Bank One Ballpark	12–25
38	May 16	@ Diamondbacks	6-1	**Hernández** (3–2)	Sparks (2–3)		32,629	Bank One Ballpark	13–25
39	May 18	vs. Brewers @ San Juan, PR	3-2	**Day** (3–4)	Davis (3-3)	**Biddle** (9)	8,387	Hiram Bithorn Stadium	14–25
40	May 19	vs. Brewers @ San Juan, PR	3-6	Santos (2–0)	**Kim** (2-2)	Kolb (9)	8,157	Hiram Bithorn Stadium	14–26
41	May 20	vs. Brewers @ San Juan, PR	2-3	Adams (2–0)	**Biddle** (0–1)	Kolb (10)	8,941	Hiram Bithorn Stadium	14–27
42	May 21	vs. Giants @ San Juan, PR	5-6	Franklin (1–0)	**Hernández** (3-3)	Herges (12)	14,325	Hiram Bithorn Stadium	14–28
43	May 22	vs. Giants @ San Juan, PR	2-7 (11)	Walker (3–0)	**Fikac** (0–1)		16,836	Hiram Bithorn Stadium	14–29
–	May 23	vs. Giants @ San Juan, PR	Postponed (rain) Rescheduled for August 18 as part of a doubleheader at San Francisco						
44	May 24	Braves	0-5	Thomson (3–2)	**Day** (3–5)		4,675	Olympic Stadium	14–30
45	May 25	Braves	3-1	**Ohka** (2–5)	Ramírez (2–4)	**Biddle** (10)	4,235	Olympic Stadium	15–30
46	May 26	Braves	1-6	Ortiz (5–4)	**Hernández** (3–4)		4,544	Olympic Stadium	15–31
47	May 28	Reds	6–7	Lidle (4–4)	**Vargas** (3-3)	Graves (22)	7,058	Olympic Stadium	15–32
48	May 29	Reds	1–4	Acevedo (3–3)	**Day** (3–6)	Graves (23)	7,913	Olympic Stadium	15–33
49	May 30	Reds	6–2	**Ohka** (3–5)	Valentine (0–1)	Cordero (1)	9,745	Olympic Stadium	16–33
50	May 31	@ Braves	2–8	Ortiz (6–4)	**Hernández** (3–5)		24,945	Turner Field	16–34

June (10–16)

#	Date	Opponent	Score	Win	Loss	Save	Attendance	Stadium	Record
51	June 1	@ Braves	6–7	Almanza (1–1)	**Biddle** (0–3)		20,271	Turner Field	16–35
52	June 2	@ Braves	8–4	**Vargas** (4–3)	Hampton (1–6)		21,055	Turner Field	17–35
53	June 4	@ Reds	4–2	**Day** (4–6)	Acevedo (3–4)	**Biddle** (11)	32,701	Great American Ballpark	18–35
54	June 5	@ Reds	3–6 (10)	Jones (4–1)	**Cordero** (1–1)		40,545	Great American Ballpark	18–36
55	June 6	@ Reds	5–6	Matthews (1–0)	**Biddle** (0–4)		31,814	Great American Ballpark	18–37
56	June 8	@ Royals	2–4	Greinke (1–1)	**Armas** (0–1)	Affeldt (7)	15,209	Kauffman Stadium	18–38
–	June 9	@ Royals	Postponed (rain) Rescheduled for June 10 as part of a doubleheader						
57	June 10 (1)	@ Royals	8–0	**Day** (5–6)	Reyes (2–1)		(Note: The two games on June 10 were played as a single-admission doubleheader with attendance counted only for the two games combined.)	Kauffman Stadium	19–38
58	June 10 (2)	@ Royals	7–2	**Kim** (3–2)	Gobble (3–4)		16,891	Kauffman Stadium	20–38
59	June 11	@ Mariners	0–1	Guardado (2–0)	**Hernández** (3–6)		32,826	Safeco Field	20–39
60	June 12	@ Mariners	0–3	Moyer (5–2)	**Vargas** (4–4)	Guardado (11)	36,562	Safeco Field	20–40
61	June 13	@ Mariners	1–8	Piñeiro (2–8)	**Armas** (0–2)		43,339	Safeco Field	20–41
62	June 15	Twins	2–8	Santana (5–5)	**Day** (5–7)		4,557	Olympic Stadium	20–42
63	June 16	Twins	4–5 (11)	Rincón (8–3)	**Fikac** (0–3)	Nathan (17)	3,763	Olympic Stadium	20–43
64	June 17	Twins	4–6	Fultz (3–2)	**Hernández** (3–7)	Nathan (18)	10,044	Olympic Stadium	20–44
65	June 18	White Sox	7–11	Cotts (1–3)	**Ayala** (0–6)	Marte (3)	4,576	Olympic Stadium	20–45
66	June 19	White Sox	17–14	**Fikac** (1–2)	Muñoz (0–1)	Cordero (2)	18,414	Olympic Stadium	21–45
67	June 20	White Sox	4–2	**Cordero** (2–1)	Garland (5–4)		6,546	Olympic Stadium	22–45
68	June 22	Phillies	5–2	**Hernández** (4–7)	Myers (5–4)	**Cordero** (3)	4,564	Olympic Stadium	23–45
69	June 23	Phillies	2–5	Millwood (5–5)	**Kim** (3–3)	Wagner (11)	4,209	Olympic Stadium	23–46
70	June 24	Phillies	3–2	**Armas** (1–2)	Milton (9–2)	**Cordero** (4)	11,655	Olympic Stadium	24–46
71	June 25	@ Blue Jays	1–3	Towers (2–2)	**Day** (5–8)	Frasor (7)	16,484	SkyDome	24–47
72	June 26	@ Blue Jays	5–10	Bastita (6–5)	**Downs** (0–1)		23,875	SkyDome	24–48
73	June 27	@ Blue Jays	9–4	**Hernández** (5–7)	Hentgen (2–8)		25,915	SkyDome	25–48
74	June 28	@ Phillies	6–14	Millwood (6–5)	**Kim** (3–4)		39,444	Citizens Bank Park	25–49
75	June 29	@ Phillies	7–17	Milton (10–2)	**Hill** (0–1)		35,390	Citizens Bank Park	25–50
76	June 30	@ Phillies	6–3	**Horgan** (1–0)	Worrell (2–3)	**Cordero** (5)	40,407	Citizens Bank Park	26–50

July (15–13)

#	Date	Opponent	Score	Win	Loss	Save	Attendance	Stadium	Record
77	July 1	@ Phillies	5–10	Wolf (3–3)	**Downs** (0–2)		43,246	Citizens Bank Park	26–51
78	July 2	vs. Blue Jays @ San Juan, PR	2–0	**Hernández** (6–7)	Bush (0–1)		8,220	Hiram Bithorn Stadium	27–51
79	July 3	vs. Blue Jays @ San Juan, PR	0–2	Halladay (7–5)	**Armas** (1–3)	Frasor (8)	8,831	Hiram Bithorn Stadium	27–52
80	July 4	vs. Blue Jays @ San Juan, PR	6–4	**Hill** (1–1)	Lilly (7–5)	**Horgan** (1)	8,279	Hiram Bithorn Stadium	28–52
81	July 5	vs. Braves @ San Juan, PR	4–11	Byrd (2–1)	**Day** (5–9)		13,122	Hiram Bithorn Stadium	28–53
82	July 6	vs. Braves @ San Juan, PR	0–1	Ortiz (9–6)	**Downs** (0–3)	Smoltz (15)	7,697	Hiram Bithorn Stadium	28–54
83	July 7	vs. Braves @ San Juan, PR	2–14	Wright (6–5)	**Hernández** (6–8)		8,534	Hiram Bithorn Stadium	28–55
84	July 8	vs. Pirates @ San Juan, PR	2–1	**Ayala** (1–6)	Grabow (0–3)	**Cordero** (6)	7,746	Hiram Bithorn Stadium	29–55
85	July 9	vs. Pirates @ San Juan, PR	0–11	Burnett (3–2)	**Hill** (1–2)		7,436	Hiram Bithorn Stadium	29–56
86	July 10	vs. Pirates @ San Juan, PR	4–0	**Biddle** (1–4)	Wells (4–6)		8,780	Hiram Bithorn Stadium	30–56
87	July 11	vs. Pirates @ San Juan, PR	2–1	**Downs** (1–3)	Fogg (6–7)	**Cordero** (7)	8,101	Hiram Bithorn Stadium	31–56
**All–Star Break (July 12–14)**
88	July 15	@ Braves	0–8	Wright (7–5)	**Hernández** (6–9)		33,883	Turner Field	31–57
89	July 16	@ Braves	5–1	**Horgan** (2–0)	Byrd (2–2)		26,424	Turner Field	32–57
90	July 17	@ Braves	2–6	Ortiz (11–6)	**Bentz** (0–3)	Smoltz (17)	34,296	Turner Field	32–58
91	July 18	@ Braves	5–16	Thompson (7–7)	**Downs** (1–4)		23,952	Turner Field	32–59
92	July 19	@ Pirates	6–2	**Horgan** (3–0)	Grabow (0–4)		14,787	PNC Park	33–59
93	July 20	@ Pirates	1–2	Burnett (4–2)	**Hernández** (6–10)	Mesa (26)	18,075	PNC Park	33–60
94	July 21	@ Mets	4–5	Moreno (3–1)	**Horgan** (3–1)	Looper (20)	30,227	Shea Stadium	33–61
95	July 22	@ Mets	4–1	**Ayala** (2–6)	Franco (2–7)	**Cordero** (8)	27,637	Shea Stadium	34–61
96	July 23	Marlins	2–1	**Armas** (2–3)	Penny (8–8)	**Cordero** (9)	6,407	Olympic Stadium	35–61
97	July 24	Marlins	6–2	**Biddle** (2–4)	Willis (7–6)		7,229	Olympic Stadium	36–61
98	July 25	Marlins	6–4	**Hernández** (7–10)	Wayne (3–3)	**Ayala** (1)	9,688	Olympic Stadium	37–61
99	July 26	Mets	19–10	**Ayala** (3–6)	Erickson (0–1)		6,643	Olympic Stadium	38–61
100	July 27	Mets	2–4	Glavine (8–8)	**Day** (5–10)	Looper (21)	7,147	Olympic Stadium	38–62
101	July 28	Mets	7–4	**Tucker** (1–1)	Seo (4–7)	**Cordero** (10)	6,852	Olympic Stadium	39–62
102	July 29	Mets	1–10	Leiter (7–3)	**Biddle** (2–5)		20,042	Olympic Stadium	39–63
103	July 30	@ Marlins	9–0	**Hernández** (8–10)	Beckett (4–6)		16,441	Pro Player Stadium	40–63
104	July 31	@ Marlins	8–5	**Biddle** (3–5)	Manzanillo (3–3)	**Cordero** (11)	21,562	Pro Player Stadium	41–63

August (15-13)

#	Date	Opponent	Score	Win	Loss	Save	Attendance	Stadium	Record
–	August 1	@ Marlins	Postponed (rain) Rescheduled for September 14 as part of a doubleheader						
105	August 3	@ Cardinals	10–6 (12)	**Cordero** (3–1)	Haren (0–2)		33,696	Busch Memorial Stadium	42–63
106	August 4	@ Cardinals	4–5	Tavárez (3–3)	**Cordero** (3–2)		35,779	Busch Memorial Stadium	42–64
107	August 5	@ Cardinals	1–2	Carpenter (12–4)	**Ayala** (3–7)	Isringhausen (28)	31,961	Busch Memorial Stadium	42–65
108	August 6	@ Astros	0–4	Oswalt (12–8)	**Biddle** (3–6)		35,921	Minute Maid Park	42–66
109	August 7	@ Astros	8–3	**Rauch** (2–1)	Weathers (6–6)		39,840	Minute Maid Park	43–66
110	August 8	@ Astros	5–2	**Tucker** (2–1)	Clemens (12–4)		38,407	Minute Maid Park	44–66
111	August 10	Diamondbacks	4–0	**Hernández** (9–10)	Johnson (11–10)		8,386	Olympic Stadium	45–66
112	August 11	Diamondbacks	7–3	**Patterson** (2–2)	Webb (4–14)		5,089	Olympic Stadium	46–66
113	August 12	Diamondbacks	7–5	**Ayala** (4–7)	Cormier (1–4)	**Cordero** (12)	14,639	Olympic Stadium	47–66
114	August 13	Astros	6–5 (12)	**Vargas** (5–4)	Harville (0–2)		8,593	Olympic Stadium	48–66
115	August 14	Astros	8–3	**Tucker** (3–1)	Hernández (0–1)		11,929	Olympic Stadium	49–66
116	August 15	Astros	4–5	Miceli (5–6)	**Ayala** (4–8)	Lidge (13)	13,528	Olympic Stadium	49–67
117	August 16	@ Giants	5–8	Christiansen (3–2)	**Cordero** (3–3)	Hermanson (4)	39,545	SBC Park	49–68
118	August 17	@ Giants	4–5	Hermanson (5–5)	**Ayala** (4–9)		39,511	SBC Park	49–69
119	August 18 (1)	@ Giants	6–2	**Biddle** (4–6)	Hennessey (1–2)		(Note: The two games on August 18 were played as a single-admission doubleheader with attendance counted only for the two games combined.)	SBC Park	50–69
120	August 18 (2)	@ Giants	4–14	Franklin (2–0)	**Tucker** (3–2)		42,296	SBC Park	50–70
121	August 20	@ Rockies	4–3	**Ayala** (5–9)	Fuentes (1–3)	**Cordero** (13)	32,707	Coors Field	51–70
122	August 21	@ Rockies	2–5	Kennedy (6–5)	**Hernández** (9–11)		33,225	Coors Field	51–71
123	August 22	@ Rockies	8–2	**Patterson** (3–2)	Jennings (11–11)		26,833	Coors Field	52–71
124	August 23	Dodgers	8–7	**Cordero** (4–3)	Carrara (3–1)		8,639	Olympic Stadium	53–71
125	August 24	Dodgers	2–10	Ishii (12–6)	**Biddle** (4–7)		8,109	Olympic Stadium	53–72
126	August 25	Dodgers	6–3	**Horgan** (4–1)	Lima (11–4)	**Ayala** (2)	7,570	Olympic Stadium	54–72
127	August 26	Dodgers	3–10	Weaver (12–10)	**Hernández** (9–12)		18,520	Olympic Stadium	54–73
128	August 27	Padres	10–3	**Downs** (2–4)	Tankersley (0–4)		8,165	Olympic Stadium	55–73
129	August 28	Padres	2–5	Peavy (11–3)	**Patterson** (3–3)	Hoffman (33)	15,450	Olympic Stadium	55–74
130	August 29	Padres	3–11	Wells (9–7)	**Kim** (3–5)		12,181	Olympic Stadium	55–75
131	August 30	Cubs	2–5	Maddux (13–8)	**Biddle** (4–8)	Hawkins (20)	8,122	Olympic Stadium	55–76
132	August 31	Cubs	8–0	**Hernández** (10–12)	Prior (4–4)		7,162	Olympic Stadium	56–76

September (9-18)

#	Date	Opponent	Score	Win	Loss	Save	Attendance	Stadiuum	Record
133	September 1	Cubs	1–2 (11)	Hawkins (4–4)	**Vargas** (5–5)		5,837	Olympic Stadium	56–77
134	September 3	Braves	1–7	Byrd (6–4)	**Downs** (2–5)		8,617	Olympic Stadium	56–78
135	September 4	Braves	0–9	Ortiz (14–7)	**Patterson** (3–4)		9,772	Olympic Stadium	56–79
136	September 5	Braves	4–3 (12)	**Tucker** (4–2)	Cruz (4–2)		10,015	Olympic Stadium	57–79
137	September 6	@ Cubs	1–9	Zambrano (13–8)	**Armas** (2–4)		38,807	Wrigley Field	57–80
138	September 7	@ Cubs	7–6 (12)	**Cordero** (5–3)	Wellemeyer (1–1)	**Horgan** (2)	38,321	Wrigley Field	58–80
139	September 8	@ Cubs	6–0	**Downs** (3–5)	Maddux (13–9)		38,379	Wrigley Field	59–80
140	September 10	@ Braves	3–4	Thomson (11–8)	**Patterson** (3–5)	Smoltz (37)	22,086	Turner Field	59–81
141	September 11	@ Braves	1–8	Cruz (5–2)	**Hernández** (10–13)		28,860	Turner Field	59–82
142	September 12	@ Braves	8–9 (12)	Cruz (6–2)	**Ayala** (5–10)		25,865	Turner Field	59–83
143	September 13	vs. Marlins @ Chicago (Note: Played at U.S. Cellular Field in Chicago, because of the threat posed to Miami by Hurricane Ivan. The games counted as Florida Marlins home games.)	3–6	Perisho (5–2)	**Majewski** (0–1)		4,003	U.S. Cellular Field	59–84
144	September 14 (1)	vs. Marlins @ Chicago	6–8	Seánez (5–2)	**Ayala** (5–11)	Mota (4)	5,457	U.S. Cellular Field	59–85
–	September 14 (2)	@ Marlins	Postponed (Hurricane Ivan) Rescheduled for September 15 as part of a doubleheader (Note: A make-up game for a rain-out on August 1, this game originally was rescheduled as part of a doubleheader on September 14 at Florida. The threat posed to the Miami, area by Hurricane Ivan prompted Major League Baseball to move the first two games (on September 13 and 14) of the five-game Florida Marlins series against the Expos to U.S. Cellular Field in Chicago, and on September 14 Florida and Montreal played only the originally scheduled game for that date at U.S. Cellular Field. The second game of the September 14 doubleheader was rescheduled to September 15 as part of a doubleheader when the Marlins returned to Florida to host the Expos for the remaining three games of the series.)						
145	September 15 (1)	@ Marlins	6–2	**Patterson** (4–5)	Pavano (17–6)		(Note: The two games on September 15 were played as a single-admission doubleheader with attendance counted only for the two games combined.)	Pro Player Stadium	60–85
146	September 15 (2)	@ Marlins	10–4	**Rauch** (3–1)	Bump (2–4)		12,608	Pro Player Stadium	61–85
147	September 16	@ Marlins	3–4	Willis (10–9)	**Hernández** (10–14)	Benítez (42)	17,219	Pro Player Stadium	61–86
148	September 17	@ Phillies	12–8	**Ayala** (6–11)	Worrell (4–6)		35,498	Citizens Bank Park	63–86
149	September 18	@ Phillies	6–5 (14)	**Cordero** (6–3)	Myers (9–10)	**Beltran** (1)	38,650	Citizens Bank Park	63–86
150	September 19	@ Phillies	2–7	Floyd (2–0)	**Downs** (3–6)		42,603	Citizens Bank Park	63–87
151	September 21	Mets	6–1	**Hernández** (11–14)	Leiter (9–8)		3,839	Olympic Stadium	64–87
152	September 22	Mets	2–3	Fortunato (1–0)	**Ayala** (6–12)	Looper (26)	3,664	Olympic Stadium	64–88
153	September 23	Mets	2–4	Glavine (10–13)	**Ohka** (3–6)	Looper (27)	11,142	Olympic Stadium	64–89
154	September 24	Phillies	8–1	**Kim** (4–5)	Myers (9–11)		5,481	Olympic Stadium	65–89
155	September 25	Phillies	3–4 (10)	Worrell (5–6)	**Eischen** (0–1)	Wagner (19)	8,491	Olympic Stadium	65–90
156	September 26	Phillies	1–2	Lidle (11–12)	**Hernández** (11–15)	Wagner (20)	12,382	Olympic Stadium	65–91
157	September 27	Marlins	1–4	Beckett (8–9)	**Patterson** (4–6)	Benítez (45)	3,923	Olympic Stadium	65–92
158	September 28	Marlins	2–5	Valdez (14–8)	**Ohka** (3–7)	Benítez (46)	5,416	Olympic Stadium	65–93
159	September 29	Marlins	1–9	Pavano (18–8)	**Kim** (4–6)		31,395	Olympic Stadium	65–94

October (2-1)

#	Date	Opponent	Score	Win	Loss	Save	Attendance	Stadium	Record
160	October 1	@ Mets	4–2	**Rauch** (4–1)	Feliciano (1–1)	**Cordero** (14)	29,273	Shea Stadium	66–94
161	October 2	@ Mets	6–3	**Cordero** (7–3)	Looper (2–5)	Majewski (1)	30,147	Shea Stadium	67–94
162	October 3	@ Mets	1–8	Glavine (11–14)	**Patterson** (4–7)		33,569	Shea Stadium	67–95

=== Notable transactions ===
- June 11, 2004: The Expos released Luis Lopez.
- July 31, 2004: The Expos sent Orlando Cabrera to the Boston Red Sox as part of a four-team deal. The Chicago Cubs sent Brendan Harris, Alex Gonzalez, and Francis Beltrán to the Expos. The Red Sox sent Nomar Garciaparra and Matt Murton to the Cubs. The Minnesota Twins sent Doug Mientkiewicz to the Red Sox. The Cubs sent minor-league player Justin Jones to the Twins.
- September 16, 2004: The Expos sent Alex Gonzalez to the San Diego Padres as part of a conditional deal.

=== Roster ===
2004 Montreal Expos
**Roster**
**Pitchers**: 36 Tony Armas Jr.; 56 Luis Ayala; 55 Francis Beltrán; 50 Rigo Beltrán; 57 Chad Bentz; 60 Rocky Biddle; 47 Roy Corcoran; 32 Chad Cordero; 54 Zach Day; 37 Scott Downs; 58 Joey Eischen; 40 Jeremy Fikac; 61 Liván Hernández; 49 Shawn Hill; 59 Joe Horgan; 31 Sun Woo Kim; 50 Gary Majewski; 34 Tomo Ohka; 21 John Patterson; 51 Jon Rauch; 52 T. J. Tucker; 33 Claudio Vargas	**Catchers**: 9 Einar Díaz; 23 Brian Schneider; **Infielders**: 7 Tony Batista; 18 Orlando Cabrera; 5 Jamey Carroll; 12 Andy Fox; 11 Alex Gonzalez; 12 Brendan Harris; 2 Maicer Izturis; 24 Nick Johnson; 1 Josh Labandeira; 37 Luis Lopez; 4 Henry Mateo; 3 José Vidro; 6 Brad Wilkerson	**Outfielders**: 11 Peter Bergeron; 22 Ron Calloway; 29 Matt Cepicky; 19 Endy Chávez; 38 Ryan Church; 2 Carl Everett; 35 Valentino Pascucci; 53 Juan Rivera; 48 Terrmel Sledge	**Manager**: 20 Frank Robinson; **Coaches**: 14 Manny Acta (Third base); 17 Tommy McCraw (Hitting); 28 Jerry Morales (First base); 13 Bob Natal (Bullpen); 16 Claude Raymond (Roving); 45 Eddie Rodriguez (Bench); 46 Randy St. Claire (Pitching)

=== Final days ===
- September 29, 2004: Hours after the announcement of the impending move to Washington, D.C., the Expos played their final game in Montreal, a 9–1 loss to the Florida Marlins before 31,395 fans at Olympic Stadium. On that day the MLB officially recognized the 1994 Expos as "The Best Team in Baseball" with a banner for the center field wall, (ironically that banner only lasted one game as it was the last Expos game in Montreal). The game was almost forfeited in the 8th inning when Expos fans threw golf balls onto the field in hopes of making the game longer.
- October 2, 2004: The Expos earned their last win before becoming the Nationals, defeating the New York Mets 6–3. Brad Wilkerson hit the last home run in Expos history in the ninth inning, his 32nd of the year.
- October 3, 2004: The New York Mets defeated Montreal 8–1 at Shea Stadium, in the final game as the Montreal Expos. Jamey Carroll scored the last Expos run and Endy Chávez became the final Expo batter in history when he grounded out in the top of the ninth to end the game. Coincidentally, Shea Stadium was where the Expos had played their first-ever game, in 1969.

=== The final game in Montreal ===
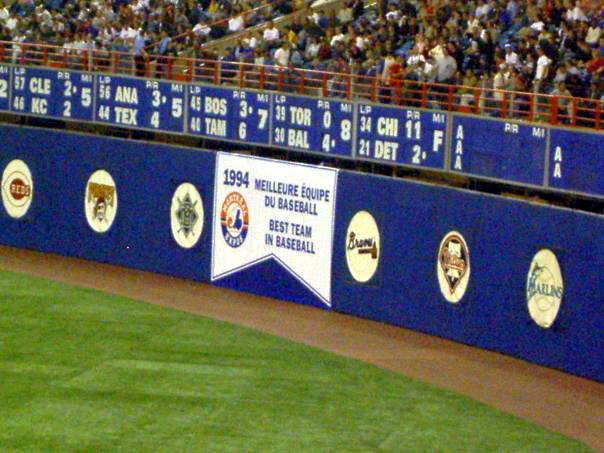
Banner raised during Montreal's final game in Olympic Stadium on September 29, 2004.

==== Scorecard ====
September 29, Olympic Stadium, Montréal, Québec

Team	1	2	3	4	5	6	7	8	9	R	H	E
**Florida**	0	4	1	0	4	0	0	0	0	**9**	**15**	**1**
Montreal	0	0	0	1	0	0	0	0	0	**1**	**7**	**2**
W: Pavano (18–8) L: Kim (4–6) HRs: Cabrera (32)
Attendance: 31,395 **Time**:2:39

==== Batting ====
Florida Marlins	AB	R	H	RBI	Montreal Expos	AB	R	H	RBI
Juan Pierre, CF	5	0	2	2	Brad Wilkerson, 1B	2	0	1	0
Paul Lo Duca, C	4	0	0	0	Labandeira, 2B	2	0	0	0
Matt Treanor PH, C	1	0	0	0	Izturis SS	4	0	0	0
Miguel Cabrera IF	4	2	1	1	Tony Batista 3B	2	1	1	0
Mike Lowell 3B	4	1	3	0	Pascucci 1B	2	0	0	0
Mordecai 3B	1	0	0	0	Terrmel Sledge lF	4	0	0	0
Jeff Conine 1B	5	2	3	1	Rivera CF	3	0	3	1
Aguila RF	5	1	1	0	Ryan Church RF	3	0	1	0
Luis Castillo 2B	2	2	1	1	Einar Díaz C	3	0	1	0
Damion Easley PH, 2B	2	0	1	0	Harris 2B, 3B	3	0	0	0
Álex González SS	5	1	2	2	Kim P	0	0	0	0
Carl Pavano P	4	0	1	1	Gary Majewski P	1	0	0	0
David Weathers P	0	0	0	0	Tucker P	0	0	0	0
Seanez P	0	0	0	0	Jamey Carroll PH	1	0	0	0
Horgan p	0	0	0	0					
Beltran, p	0	0	0	0					
Chavez, ph	1	0	0	0					
Cordero, p	0	0	0	0					
**Totals**	42	9	15	8	**Totals**	31	1	7	1

==== Pitching ====
Florida Marlins	IP	H	R	ER	BB	SO
Pavano, W (18–8)	7.0	7	1	1	0	3
Weathers	1.0	0	0	0	0	1
Seanez	1.0	0	0	0	0	0
**Totals**	9.0	7	1	1	0	4

Montreal Expos	IP	H	R	ER	BB	SO
Kim, L (4–6)	2.0	5	5	2	1	1
Majewski	2.1	2	2	2	1	1
Tucker	0.2	4	2	2	0	1
Horgan	2.0	2	0	0	0	2
Beltran	1.0	1	0	0	0	1
Cordero	1.0	1	0	0	0	2
**Totals**	9.0	15	9	6	2	8

=== The final game as the Expos ===
==== Scorecard ====
October 3, Shea Stadium, Flushing, New York

Team	1	2	3	4	5	6	7	8	9	R	H	E
Montreal	1	0	0	0	0	0	0	0	0	**1**	**5**	**2**
**New York**	1	0	2	0	1	3	0	1	x	**8**	**11**	**1**
W: Tom Glavine (11–14) L: John Patterson (4–7) HRs: David Wright (14), Todd Zeile (9)
Attendance: 33,569 **Time**:3:10

==== Batting ====
Montreal Expos	AB	R	H	RBI	New York Mets	AB	R	H	RBI
Wilkerson, 1b	3	0	0	0	Reyes, ss	4	2	1	0
Chavez, cf	1	0	0	0	Matsui, 2b	4	0	1	1
Carroll, 2b	2	1	0	0	Bell, p	0	0	0	0
Pascucci rf,1b	4	0	3	0	Franco, p	0	0	0	0
Sledge, lf	3	0	2	1	Delgado, ph	1	0	1	1
Church cf, rf	4	0	0	0	Hietpas, c	0	0	0	0
Diaz, c	4	0	0	0	Wright, 3b	3	1	2	3
Harris, 3b	3	0	0	0	Piazza, 1b	2	0	1	0
Labandeira, ss	4	0	0	0	Brazell, 1b	2	0	0	0
Patterson, p	2	0	0	0	Cameron, cf	4	0	0	0
Vargas, p	0	0	0	0	Valent, lf	4	1	2	0
Batista, ph	1	0	0	0	Williams, lf	0	0	0	0
Rauch, p	0	0	0	0	Diaz, rf	4	1	1	0
Beltran, p	0	0	0	0	Zeile, c	3	1	1	3
Izturis, ph	1	0	0	0	Garcia, ph	1	1	1	0
Fortunato, p	0	0	0	0					
Glavine, p	0	1	0	0					
Keppinger ph,2b	1	0	0	0					
**Totals**	32	1	5	1	**Totals**	33	8	11	8

==== Pitching ====
Montreal Expos	IP	H	R	ER	BB	SO
Patterson, L (4–7)	4.1	4	4	4	3	3
Vargas	1.2	3	3	3	0	1
Rauch	1.0	2	0	0	0	1
Beltran	1.0	2	1	1	1	1
**TOTALS**	8.0	11	8	8	4	6

New York Mets	IP	H	R	ER	BB	SO
Glavine, W, (11–14)	6.0	3	1	1	4	5
Bell	1.2	1	0	0	0	2
Franco	0.1	1	0	0	0	0
Fortunato	1.0	0	0	0	1	2
**TOTALS**	9.0	5	1	1	5	9

=== Attendance ===
Including both games played in Montreal and "home" games played in San Juan, the Expos drew 749,550 fans during the 2004 season, and were 16th in attendance among the 16 National League teams. Their highest attendance for the season was for their final game in Montreal on September 29, which attracted 31,395 fans to see them play the Florida Marlins, while their lowest was for a game in Montreal on May 5 against the Colorado Rockies, which drew only 3,609 fans. For games played in San Juan, the largest crowd was 16,836 for a game against the San Francisco Giants on May 22, and the smallest was a crowd of 7,436 that came to a game against the Pittsburgh Pirates on July 9.

The Expos lost one home date during the season, when the May 23 "home" game at San Juan against the Giants was rained out and rescheduled to be played as an away game in San Francisco as part of a single-admission doubleheader on August 18. The doubleheader drew 42,296.

== Player stats ==
=== Batting ===
Note: Pos = Position; G = Games played; AB = At bats; R = Runs scored; H = Hits; 2B = Doubles; 3B = Triples; HR = Home runs; RBI = Runs batted in; AVG = Batting average; SB = Stolen bases

Complete offensive statistics are available here.

Pos	Player	G	AB	R	H	2B	3B	HR	RBI	AVG	SB
C	Brian Schneider	135	436	40	112	20	3	12	49	.257	0
1B	Brad Wilkerson	160	572	112	146	39	2	32	67	.255	13
2B	José Vidro	110	412	51	121	24	0	14	60	.294	3
SS	Orlando Cabrera	103	390	41	96	19	2	4	31	.246	12
3B	Tony Batista	157	606	76	146	30	2	32	110	.241	14
LF	Termel Sledge	133	398	45	107	20	6	15	62	.269	3
CF	Endy Chávez	132	502	65	139	20	6	5	34	.277	32
RF	Juan Rivera	134	391	48	120	24	1	12	49	.307	6
1B	Nick Johnson	73	251	35	63	16	0	7	33	.251	6
2B	Jamey Carroll	102	218	36	63	14	2	0	16	.289	5
C	Einar Díaz	55	139	9	31	6	1	1	11	.223	2
SS	Alex Gonzalez	35	133	19	32	7	0	4	16	.241	1
OF	Carl Everett	39	127	8	32	10	0	2	14	.252	0
SS	Maicer Izturis	32	107	10	22	5	2	1	4	.206	4
OF	Ron Calloway	46	84	4	14	2	0	1	10	.167	2
UT	Valentino Pascucci	32	62	6	11	1	0	2	6	.177	1
OF	Ryan Church	30	63	6	11	1	0	1	6	.175	0
UT	Matt Cepicky	32	60	4	13	4	0	1	3	.217	1
IF	Brendan Harris	20	50	4	8	2	0	1	2	.160	0
UT	Henry Mateo	40	44	3	12	2	0	0	0	.273	2
CF	Peter Bergeron	11	42	2	9	0	0	0	1	.214	0
IF	Andy Fox	34	43	2	4	0	0	1	1	.093	0
1B	Luis Lopez	11	26	0	4	0	0	0	3	.154	0
MI	Josh Labandeira	7	14	0	0	0	0	0	0	.000	0
P	Liván Hernández	34	81	2	20	7	0	1	10	.247	0
P	John Patterson	19	33	0	4	0	0	0	1	.121	0
P	Zach Day	17	29	1	1	0	0	1	1	.034	0
P	Sun-woo Kim	41	28	1	6	2	0	0	5	.214	0
P	Claudio Vargas	42	22	0	1	0	0	0	0	.045	0
P	Tomo Ohka	14	25	0	2	0	0	0	0	.080	1
P	Scott Downs	11	15	1	1	0	0	0	0	.067	0
P	Tony Armas Jr.	15	16	0	0	0	0	0	0	.000	0
P	Rocky Biddle	44	11	0	0	0	0	0	0	.000	0
P	T. J. Tucker	51	12	1	1	0	0	0	0	.083	0
P	Luis Ayala	79	9	0	3	1	0	0	0	.333	0
P	Jon Rauch	9	6	1	1	0	0	1	2	.167	0
P	Joe Horgan	45	4	0	1	0	0	0	1	.250	0
P	Joey Eischen	22	3	2	2	0	0	0	0	.667	0
P	Chad Cordero	67	2	0	0	0	0	0	0	.000	0
P	Shawn Hill	3	2	0	0	0	0	0	0	.000	0
P	Chad Bentz	35	2	0	1	0	0	0	0	.500	0
P	Francis Beltrán	11	2	0	1	0	0	0	0	.500	0
P	Gary Majewski	16	2	0	0	0	0	0	0	.000	0
P	Roy Corcoran	5	0	0	0	0	0	0	0	–	0
P	Rigo Beltrán	2	0	0	0	0	0	0	0	–	0
P	Jeremy Fikac	18	0	0	0	0	0	0	0	–	0
	Team totals	162	5474	635	1361	276	27	151	605	.249	109

=== Pitching ===
Note: Pos = Position; W = Wins; L = Losses; ERA = Earned run average; G = Games pitched; GS = Games started; SV = Saves; IP = Innings pitched; H = Hits allowed; R = Runs allowed; ER = Earned runs allowed; BB = Walks allowed; K = Strikeouts

Complete pitching statistics are available here.

Pos	Player	W	L	ERA	G	GS	SV	IP	H	R	ER	BB	K
SP	Liván Hernández	11	15	3.60	35	35	0	255.0	234	105	102	83	186
SP	Zach Day	5	10	3.93	19	19	0	116.2	117	53	51	45	61
SP	John Patterson	4	7	5.03	19	19	0	98.1	100	58	55	46	99
SP	Tomo Ohka	3	7	3.40	15	15	0	84.2	98	40	32	20	38
SP	Tony Armas Jr.	2	4	4.88	16	16	0	72.0	66	41	39	45	54
SP	Scott Downs	3	6	5.14	12	12	0	63.0	79	47	36	23	38
CL	Chad Cordero	7	3	2.94	69	0	14	82.2	68	28	27	43	84
RP	Luis Ayala	6	12	2.69	81	0	2	90.1	92	30	27	15	63
RP	Rocky Biddle	4	8	6.92	47	9	11	78.0	98	69	60	31	51
RP	T. J. Tucker	4	2	3.72	54	1	0	67.2	73	28	28	17	44
RP	Joe Horgan	4	1	3.15	47	0	2	40.0	35	18	14	22	30
	Sun-woo Kim	4	6	4.58	43	17	0	135.2	145	80	69	55	87
	Claudio Vargas	5	5	5.25	45	14	0	118.1	120	75	69	64	89
	Chad Bentz	0	3	5.86	36	0	0	27.2	23	19	18	23	18
	Jeremy Fikac	1	2	5.40	19	0	0	25.0	26	16	15	13	22
	Jon Rauch	3	0	1.54	9	2	0	23.1	14	4	4	7	18
	Gary Majewski	0	1	3.86	16	0	1	21.0	28	15	9	5	12
	Joey Eischen	0	1	3.93	21	0	0	18.1	16	10	8	8	17
	Francis Beltrán	0	0	7.53	11	0	1	14.1	20	12	12	5	8
	Shawn Hill	1	2	16.00	3	3	0	9.0	17	16	16	7	10
	Roy Corcoran	0	0	6.75	5	0	0	5.1	7	4	4	5	4
	Rigo Beltrán	0	0	13.50	2	0	0	0.2	1	1	1	0	0
	Team totals	67	95	4.33	162	162	31	1447.0	1477	769	696	582	1032

== Awards and honors ==
- Liván Hernández, Silver Slugger Award

=== League leaders ===
- Liván Hernández, National League Leader, Complete Games, 9
- Liván Hernández, National League Leader, Innings Pitched, 255.0
- Liván Hernández, National League Leader, 3,927 pitches thrown

=== All-Stars ===
2004 Major League Baseball All-Star Game

- Liván Hernández, pitcher, reserve

== Relocation to Washington ==
After several years in a holding pattern, MLB began actively looking for a relocation site for the Expos. Some of the choices included Orlando, Florida; Dayton, Ohio; Oklahoma City; Washington, D.C.; San Juan, Puerto Rico; Monterrey, Mexico; Portland, Oregon; Northern Virginia; Norfolk, Virginia; and Charlotte, North Carolina. In the decision-making process, Commissioner Bud Selig added Las Vegas, Nevada to the list of potential Expos homes.

On September 29, 2004, MLB officially announced that the Expos would move to Washington, D.C. in 2005. The move was approved by the owners of the other teams in a 28–1 vote on December 3 (Baltimore Orioles owner Peter Angelos cast the sole dissenting vote). In addition, on November 15, 2004, a lawsuit by the former team owners against MLB and former majority owner Jeffrey Loria was struck down by arbitrators, ending legal moves to keep the Expos in Montreal.

== Retired numbers ceremony ==
As a tribute to the Expos, on October 18, 2005, the Montreal Canadiens honoured the departed team by raising an Expos commemorative banner, which lists the retired numbers, to the rafters of the Bell Centre. Gary Carter and Andre Dawson were at the ceremony with Youppi, who was now the Canadiens mascot. The Banner featured all of the Expos retired numbers:

- 8 Gary Carter, C, 1974-84 & 1992
- 10 Andre Dawson, OF, 1977–86 and Rusty Staub, OF, 1969-71 & 1979
- 30 Tim Raines, OF, 1979-90 & 2001
- 42 Jackie Robinson (retired throughout baseball; played with the Montreal Royals in 1946)

== Expos in the Washington Nationals Ring of Honor ==
On August 10, 2010, the Washington Nationals formally presented a new "Ring of Honor" at Nationals Park in Washington, D.C., to honor Major League Baseball Hall of Fame players with ties to the Washington Nationals, original Washington Senators, expansion Washington Senators, Homestead Grays, or Montreal Expos. Gary Carter and Andre Dawson were the former Expos honored in the Ring of Honor on that day. The Expos logo appears next to their names in the Ring of Honor. On May 9, 2015, the Nationals added former Expos (2002–2004) and Nationals (2005–2006) manager Frank Robinson to the Ring of Honor at Nationals Park.

== Farm system ==
Level	Team	League	Manager
AAA	Edmonton Trappers	Pacific Coast League	Dave Huppert
AA	Harrisburg Senators	Eastern League	Dave Machemer
A	Brevard County Manatees	Florida State League	Tim Raines
A	Savannah Sand Gnats	South Atlantic League	Bob Henley
A-Short Season	Vermont Expos	New York–Penn League	José Alguacil
Rookie	GCL Expos	Gulf Coast League	Arturo DeFreites
