= 2004 Philadelphia Phillies season =

Major League Baseball season

2004 Philadelphia Phillies
- League: National League
- Division: East
- Ballpark: Citizens Bank Park
- City: Philadelphia
- Record: 86–76 (.531)
- Divisional place: 2nd
- Owners: Bill Giles
- General managers: Ed Wade
- Managers: Larry Bowa, Gary Varsho
- Television: WPSG; CSN Philadelphia
- Radio: WPEN (Harry Kalas, Larry Andersen, Chris Wheeler, Scott Graham)

The 2004 Philadelphia Phillies season was the 122nd season in the history of the franchise. The Phillies finished in second-place in the National League East with a record of 86–76, ten games behind the Atlanta Braves, and six games behind the NL wild-card champion Houston Astros. The Phillies were managed by their former shortstop Larry Bowa (85–75) and Gary Varsho (1–1), who replaced Bowa on the penultimate day of the season. The Phillies played their first season of home games at Citizens Bank Park, which opened April 12, with the visiting Cincinnati Reds defeating the Phillies, 4–1.

== Offseason ==
- November 3, 2003: Billy Wagner was traded by the Houston Astros to the Philadelphia Phillies for Brandon Duckworth, Taylor Buchholz, and Ezequiel Astacio.
- January 15, 2004: A. J. Hinch signed as a free agent with the Philadelphia Phillies.

== Regular season ==
A season of high expectations due to notable offseason moves was a disappointment, costing manager Larry Bowa his job towards season's end.

=== Season standings ===
==== National League East ====
NL East
Team	W	L	Pct.	GB	Home	Road
Atlanta Braves	96	66	.593	—	49‍–‍32	47‍–‍34
Philadelphia Phillies	86	76	.531	10	42‍–‍39	44‍–‍37
Florida Marlins	83	79	.512	13	42‍–‍38	41‍–‍41
New York Mets	71	91	.438	25	38‍–‍43	33‍–‍48
Montreal Expos	67	95	.414	29	35‍–‍45	32‍–‍50

==== Record vs. opponents ====
2004 National League record Source: MLB Standings Grid – 2004
Team	AZ	ATL	CHC	CIN	COL	FLA	HOU	LAD	MIL	MON	NYM	PHI	PIT	SD	SF	STL	AL
Arizona	—	2–4	4–2	3–3	6–13	3–4	2–4	3–16	3–3	0–6	3–4	1–5	2–4	7–12	5–14	1–5	6–12
Atlanta	4–2	—	3–3	2–4	4–2	14–5	3–3	4–3	4–2	15–4	12–7	10–9	4–2	3–3	4–3	2–4	8–10
Chicago	2–4	3–3	—	9–8	5–1	3–3	10–9	2–4	10–7	3–3	4–2	3–3	13–5	4–2	2–4	8–11	8–4
Cincinnati	3–3	4–2	8–9	—	3–3	4–2	6–11	4–2	10–8	4–2	3–3	3–3	9–10	2–4	3–3	5–14	5-7
Colorado	13–6	2–4	1–5	3–3	—	1–5	1–5	8–11	2–4	2–4	1–5	5–3	2–4	10–9	8–11	1–5	8–10
Florida	4–3	5–14	3–3	2–4	5–1	—	3–3	3–3	4–2	11–8	15–4	12–7	1–5	4–2	2–5	2–4	7–11
Houston	4–2	3–3	9–10	11–6	5–1	3-3	—	1–5	13–6	2–4	2–4	6–0	12–5	2–4	2–4	10–8	7–5
Los Angeles	16–3	3–4	4–2	2–4	11–8	3–3	5–1	—	3–3	4–3	3–3	1–5	6–0	10–9	10–9	2–4	10–8
Milwaukee	3–3	2–4	7–10	8–10	4–2	2–4	6–13	3–3	—	5–1	2–4	0–6	6–12	2–4	1–5	8–9	8–4
Montreal	6–0	4–15	3–3	2–4	4–2	8-11	4–2	3–4	1–5	—	9–10	7–12	4–2	1–6	1–5	3–3	7–11
New York	4–3	7–12	2–4	3–3	5–1	4–15	4–2	3–3	4–2	10–9	—	8–11	1–5	1–6	4–2	1–5	10–8
Philadelphia	5-1	9–10	3–3	3–3	3–5	7–12	0–6	5–1	6–0	12–7	11–8	—	3–3	5–1	2–4	3–3	9–9
Pittsburgh	4–2	2–4	5–13	10–9	4–2	5–1	5–12	0–6	12–6	2–4	5–1	3–3	—	3–3	5–1	5–12	2–10
San Diego	12–7	3–3	2–4	4–2	9–10	2–4	4–2	9–10	4–2	6–1	6–1	1–5	3–3	—	12–7	2–4	8–10
San Francisco	14–5	3–4	4–2	3–3	11–8	5–2	4–2	9–10	5–1	5–1	2–4	4–2	1–5	7–12	—	3–3	11–7
St. Louis	5–1	4–2	11–8	14–5	5–1	4-2	8–10	4–2	9–8	3–3	5–1	3–3	12–5	4–2	3–3	—	11–1

=== Notable transactions ===
- July 30, 2004: Ricky Ledée was traded by the Philadelphia Phillies with Alfredo Simón (minors) to the San Francisco Giants for Félix Rodríguez.

=== Citizens Bank Park ===
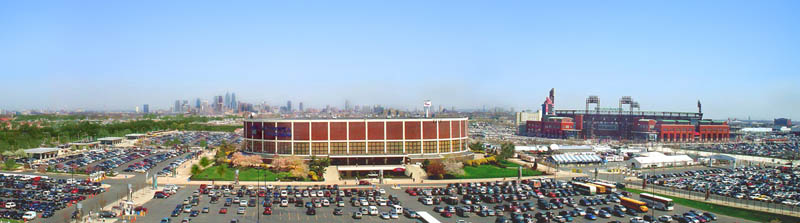
Citizens Bank Park (right), the newest (2004) of the four venues which now make up Philadelphia's "Sports Complex", the four decade old Wachovia Spectrum (center), its oldest (1967) facility, tree lined S. Broad St. (left), and the city's expansive skyline along the horizon to the North, as viewed from the roof of the Wachovia Center (1996). (Composite panoramic digital image by Bruce C. Cooper, DigitalImageServices.com)

Citizens Bank Park is a 43,647-seat baseball-only stadium in Philadelphia, Pennsylvania that opened on April 3, 2004, and hosted its first regular-season baseball game on April 12 of that same year, as the tenants of the facility, the Philadelphia Phillies lost to the Cincinnati Reds, 4–1. The ballpark was built to replace the now-demolished Veterans Stadium (a football/baseball multipurpose facility), and features natural grass and dirt playing field and also features a number of Philadelphia style food stands, including several which serve cheesesteaks, hoagies, and other regional specialties. Behind center field is Ashburn Alley, named after Phillies great center fielder and Hall of Famer Richie Ashburn, a walkway featuring restaurants and memorabilia from Phillies history, along with a restaurant/bar and grille called "Harry The K's" named after Hall of Fame broadcaster Harry Kalas.

The plaque marking the landing point of Jim Thome's 400th career home run.

- Randy Wolf of the Phillies threw the first pitch at 1:32 PM US EDT on April 12, 2004, to D'Angelo Jiménez of the Reds, who got the park's first hit, a leadoff double. Bobby Abreu of the Phillies hit the first home run, which also served as the franchise's first hit in the club's new home. Reds pitcher Paul Wilson earned the first win in that game and Danny Graves earned the park's first save.
- On June 14, 2004, Jim Thome hit his 400th career home run to the left-center field seats at Citizens Bank Park.

=== 2004 game log ===
Legend
	Phillies win
	Phillies loss
	Postponement
**Bold**	Phillies team member

2004 Game Log
Overall Record: 86–76
April (10–11)

#	Date	Opponent	Score	Win	Loss	Save	Attendance	Record
1	April 5	@ Pirates	1–2	Kip Wells (1–0)	**Kevin Millwood** (0–1)	José Mesa (1)	35,702	0–1
2	April 7	@ Pirates	5–4	**Rhéal Cormier** (1–0)	Brian Boehringer (0–1)	**Billy Wagner** (1)	15,126	1–1
3	April 8	@ Pirates	2–6	Ryan Vogelsong (1–0)	**Vicente Padilla** (0–1)	José Mesa (2)	9,689	1–2
4	April 9	@ Marlins	3–4	Matt Perisho (2–0)	**Rhéal Cormier** (1–1)	Armando Benítez (3)	22,923	1–3
5	April 10	@ Marlins	3–5	Darren Oliver (1–0)	**Rhéal Cormier** (1–2)	Armando Benítez (4)	45,725	1–4
6	April 11	@ Marlins	1–3	Josh Beckett (1–0)	**Kevin Millwood** (0–2)	Armando Benítez (5)	21,317	1–5
7	April 12	Reds	1–4	Paul Wilson (2–0)	**Randy Wolf** (0–1)	Danny Graves (4)	41,626	1–6
–	April 14	Reds	Postponed (rain); Makeup: June 14					
8	April 15	Reds	6–4	**Rhéal Cormier** (2–2)	Ryan Wagner (0–1)	**Billy Wagner** (2)	37,512	2–6
9	April 16	Expos	4–2	**Eric Milton** (1–0)	Liván Hernández (0–2)	**Billy Wagner** (3)	39,613	3–6
10	April 17	Expos	6–3	**Kevin Millwood** (1–2)	John Patterson (1–1)	**Billy Wagner** (4)	42,931	4–6
11	April 18	Expos	5–4	**Billy Wagner** (1–0)	Rocky Biddle (0–1)	None	43,791	5–6
12	April 20	Marlins	1–3	Dontrelle Willis (3–0)	**Vicente Padilla** (0–2)	Armando Benítez (7)	36,479	5–7
13	April 21	Marlins	7–8 (12)	Justin Wayne (1–0)	**Ryan Madson** (0–1)	None	34,060	5–8
14	April 22	Marlins	7–9	Darren Oliver (2–1)	**Brett Myers** (0–1)	Armando Benítez (8)	35,880	5–9
15	April 23	@ Expos	8–6	**Kevin Millwood** (2–2)	Chad Bentz (0–2)	**Billy Wagner** (5)	30,112	6–9
16	April 24	@ Expos	7–0	**Randy Wolf** (1–1)	Tomo Ohka (0–4)	None	6,899	7–9
17	April 25	@ Expos	0–2	Zach Day (2–1)	**Vicente Padilla** (0–3)	Rocky Biddle (5)	8,267	7–10
18	April 27	@ Cardinals	7–3	**Eric Milton** (2–0)	Matt Morris (3–2)	None	25,185	8–10
19	April 28	@ Cardinals	6–3	**Ryan Madson** (1–1)	Mike Lincoln (2–2)	**Billy Wagner** (6)	26,348	9–10
20	April 29	@ Cardinals	4–5 (13)	Mike Lincoln (3–2)	**Amaury Telemaco** (0–1)	None	29,768	9–11
21	April 30	Diamondbacks	4–0	**Randy Wolf** (2–1)	Elmer Dessens (1–3)	None	43,721	10–11

May (17–11)

#	Date	Opponent	Score	Win	Loss	Save	Attendance	Record
22	May 1	Diamondbacks	4–6	Randy Johnson (3–2)	**Vicente Padilla** (0–4)	Matt Mantei (4)	44,048	10–12
23	May 2	Diamondbacks	6–5 (14)	**Ryan Madson** (2–1)	Óscar Villarreal (0–2)	None	43,025	11–12
24	May 4	Cardinals	5–6	Chris Carpenter (2–1)	**Brett Myers** (0–2)	Jason Isringhausen (3)	33,294	11–13
25	May 5	Cardinals	5–4	**Kevin Millwood** (3–2)	Woody Williams (0–3)	**Billy Wagner** (7)	35,944	12–13
26	May 6	Cardinals	4–7	Jeff Suppan (3–3)	**Randy Wolf** (2–2)	Jason Isringhausen (4)	44,376	12–14
27	May 7	@ Diamondbacks	4–1	**Vicente Padilla** (1–4)	Randy Johnson (3–3)	**Billy Wagner** (8)	30,738	13–14
28	May 8	@ Diamondbacks	8–7	**Eric Milton** (3–0)	Brandon Webb (2–2)	**Tim Worrell** (1)	38,907	14–14
29	May 9	@ Diamondbacks	7–1	**Brett Myers** (1–2)	Steve Sparks (2–2)	None	29,637	15–14
30	May 11	@ Giants	10–4	**Kevin Millwood** (4–2)	Jerome Williams (3–2)	None	35,759	16–14
31	May 12	@ Giants	3–4	Jason Schmidt (3–2)	**Randy Wolf** (2–3)	Matt Herges (11)	35,849	16–15
32	May 13	@ Giants	4–3	**Vicente Padilla** (2–4)	Kirk Rueter (1–4)	**Ryan Madson** (1)	39,651	17–15
33	May 14	@ Rockies	6–4	**Eric Milton** (4–0)	Joe Kennedy (4–1)	**Tim Worrell** (2)	32,171	18–15
34	May 15	@ Rockies	16–5	**Brett Myers** (2–2)	Scott Elarton (0–6)	None	33,629	19–15
35	May 16	@ Rockies	6–7	Tim Harikkala (1–0)	**Rhéal Cormier** (2–3)	Shawn Chacón (10)	33,623	19–16
36	May 17	@ Rockies	6–7	Brian Fuentes (1–0)	**Tim Worrell** (0–1)	None	22,111	19–17
37	May 18	Dodgers	8–7	**Vicente Padilla** (3–4)	Guillermo Mota (2–1)	**Tim Worrell** (3)	36,073	20–17
38	May 19	Dodgers	9–4	**Eric Milton** (5–0)	Hideo Nomo (3–5)	None	33,916	21–17
39	May 20	Dodgers	4–0	**Brett Myers** (3–2)	Kazuhisa Ishii (5–3)	None	37,793	22–17
40	May 21	Padres	5–4	**Ryan Madson** (3–1)	Akinori Otsuka (3–2)	**Tim Worrell** (4)	40,555	23–17
41	May 22	Padres	6–9	Justin Germano (1–0)	**Roberto Hernández** (0–1)	None	43,634	23–18
42	May 23	Padres	6–4	**Vicente Padilla** (4–4)	Brian Lawrence (6–3)	**Tim Worrell** (5)	44,216	24–18
43	May 25	@ Mets	0–5	Steve Trachsel (5–3)	**Eric Milton** (5–1)	None	29,385	24–19
44	May 26	@ Mets	7–4	**Roberto Hernández** (1–1)	John Franco (0–3)	**Tim Worrell** (6)	20,349	25–19
45	May 27	Braves	1–6	Jaret Wright (3–5)	**Kevin Millwood** (4–3)	None	38,802	25–20
46	May 28	Braves	3–2 (10)	**Tim Worrell** (1–1)	Antonio Alfonseca (5–1)	None	40,187	26–20
47	May 29	Braves	3–9	John Thomson (4–2)	**Vicente Padilla** (4–5)	None	44,057	26–21
48	May 30	Braves	4–1	**Eric Milton** (6–1)	Travis Smith (0–1)	**Tim Worrell** (7)	44,304	27–21
49	May 31	Mets	3–5	Orber Moreno (1–1)	**Brett Myers** (3–3)	Braden Looper (8)	43,620	27–22

June (13–14)

#	Date	Opponent	Score	Win	Loss	Save	Attendance	Record
50	June 1	Mets	1–4 (10)	Ricky Bottalico (2–0)	**Tim Worrell** (1–2)	Braden Looper (9)	34,436	27–23
51	June 2	Mets	5–3 (10)	David Weathers (5–1)	**Roberto Hernández** (1–2)	Braden Looper (10)	37,625	27–24
52	June 3	@ Braves	4–8	John Thomson (5–2)	**Josh Hancock** (0–1)	None	23,405	27–25
53	June 4	@ Braves	9–1	**Eric Milton** (7–1)	Travis Smith (0–2)	None	27,699	28–25
54	June 5	@ Braves	5–3	**Brett Myers** (4–3)	Russ Ortiz (6–5)	**Tim Worrell** (8)	29,252	29–25
55	June 6	@ Braves	4–6	Jaret Wright (4–5)	**Kevin Millwood** (4–4)	John Smoltz (8)	27,775	29–26
56	June 8	@ White Sox	11–14	Mark Buehrle (6–1)	**Amaury Telemaco** (0–2)	Cliff Politte (1)	33,114	29–27
57	June 9	@ White Sox	13–10	**Eric Milton** (8–1)	Jon Garland (5–3)	None	17,570	30–27
–	June 10	@ White Sox	Postponed (rain); Makeup: August 30					
58	June 11	@ Twins	11–6	**Tim Worrell** (2–2)	Terry Mulholland (0–2)	None	22,272	31–27
59	June 12	@ Twins	1–6	Carlos Silva (7–3)	**Kevin Millwood** (4–5)	None	22,219	31–28
60	June 13	@ Twins	2–1	**Rhéal Cormier** (3–3)	Aaron Fultz (2–2)	**Billy Wagner** (9)	23,479	32–28
61	June 14	Reds	10–7 (8)	**Ryan Madson** (4–1)	John Riedling (4–1)	None	44,710	33–28
62	June 15	Tigers	3–10	Jeremy Bonderman (5–5)	**Brian Powell** (0–1)	None	39,555	33–29
–	June 16	Tigers	Postponed (rain); Makeup: June 17 as a day-night double-header					
63	June 17 (1)	Tigers	6–2	**Brett Myers** (5–3)	Mike Maroth (5–4)	None	44,551	34–29
64	June 17 (2)	Tigers	4–5 (11)	Ugueth Urbina (2–2)	**Ryan Madson** (4–2)	Danny Patterson (2)	39,674	34–30
65	June 18	Royals	4–10	Chris George (1–0)	**Paul Abbott** (2–6)	None	43,571	34–31
66	June 19	Royals	4–2	**Eric Milton** (9–1)	Zack Greinke (1–3)	**Billy Wagner** (10)	44,234	35–31
67	June 20	Royals	8–2	**Brian Powell** (1–1)	Dennys Reyes (2–2)	None	44,411	36–31
68	June 22	@ Expos	2–5	Liván Hernández (4–7)	**Brett Myers** (5–4)	Chad Cordero (3)	4,564	36–32
69	June 23	@ Expos	5–2	**Kevin Millwood** (5–5)	Sun-Woo Kim (3–3)	**Billy Wagner** (11)	4,209	37–32
70	June 24	@ Expos	2–3	Tony Armas (1–2)	**Eric Milton** (9–2)	Chad Cordero (4)	11,655	37–33
71	June 25	@ Red Sox	1–12 (8)	Pedro Martínez (8–3)	**Paul Abbott** (2–7)	None	35,059	37–34
72	June 26	@ Red Sox	9–2	**Ryan Madson** (5–2)	Bronson Arroyo (2–7)	None	34,712	38–34
73	June 27	@ Red Sox	3–12	Curt Schilling (10–4)	**Brett Myers** (5–5)	None	34,739	38–35
74	June 28	Expos	14–6	**Kevin Millwood** (6–5)	Sun-Woo Kim (3–4)	None	39,444	39–35
75	June 29	Expos	17–7	**Eric Milton** (10–2)	Shawn Hill (0–1)	None	35,390	40–35
76	June 30	Expos	3–6	Joe Horgan (1–0)	**Tim Worrell** (2–3)	Chad Cordero (5)	40,407	40–36

July (13–15)

#	Date	Opponent	Score	Win	Loss	Save	Attendance	Record
77	July 1	Expos	10–5	**Randy Wolf** (3–3)	Scott Downs (0–2)	None	43,246	41–36
78	July 2	Orioles	6–7 (16)	Eddy Rodríguez (1–0)	**Brian Powell** (1–2)	Daniel Cabrera (1)	44,390	41–37
79	July 3	Orioles	7–6	**Rhéal Cormier** (4–3)	Jason Grimsley (3–5)	**Billy Wagner** (12)	44,163	42–37
80	July 4	Orioles	5–2	**Eric Milton** (11–2)	Sidney Ponson (3–12)	**Tim Worrell** (9)	43,396	43–37
81	July 5	Mets	6–5	**Ryan Madson** (6–2)	Tom Glavine (7–6)	**Billy Wagner** (13)	41,571	44–37
82	July 6	Mets	1–4	Al Leiter (5–2)	**Randy Wolf** (3–4)	Braden Looper (17)	36,230	44–38
83	July 7	Mets	1–10	Steve Trachsel (9–6)	**Brett Myers** (5–6)	None	37,687	44–39
84	July 8	Mets	5–4	**Billy Wagner** (2–0)	John Franco (2–5)	None	42,601	45–39
85	July 9	Braves	7–6 (10)	**Billy Wagner** (3–0)	Antonio Alfonseca (5–3)	None	44,180	46–39
86	July 10	Braves	0–4	Mike Hampton (4–8)	**Paul Abbott** (2–8)	None	44,307	46–40
87	July 11	Braves	4–6	Russ Ortiz (10–6)	**Randy Wolf** (3–5)	John Smoltz (16)	44,519	46–41
–	July 13	**2004 Major League Baseball All-Star Game at Minute Maid Park in Houston**						
88	July 15	@ Mets	2–3 (11)	José Parra (1–0)	**Roberto Hernández** (1–3)	None	36,803	46–42
89	July 16	@ Mets	5–1	**Kevin Millwood** (7–5)	Jae Weong Seo (4–6)	**Billy Wagner** (14)	42,584	47–42
90	July 17	@ Mets	8–2	**Randy Wolf** (4–5)	Tom Glavine (7–8)	None	35,425	48–42
91	July 18	@ Mets	1–6	Al Leiter (6–3)	**Brett Myers** (5–7)	Braden Looper (19)	30,443	48–43
92	July 19	@ Braves	2–4	Mike Hampton (5–8)	**Paul Abbott** (2–9)	John Smoltz (18)	25,790	48–44
93	July 20	@ Braves	4–3 (10)	**Tim Worrell** (3–3)	Antonio Alfonseca (5–4)	**Billy Wagner** (15)	36,006	49–44
94	July 21	Marlins	2–1	**Kevin Millwood** (8–5)	A. J. Burnett (1–5)	**Billy Wagner** (16)	44,077	50–44
95	July 22	Marlins	8–10	Carl Pavano (10–4)	**Randy Wolf** (4–6)	Armando Benítez (33)	44,316	50–45
96	July 23	Cubs	1–5	Kerry Wood (5–3)	**Brett Myers** (5–8)	None	44,060	50–46
97	July 24	Cubs	4–3	**Paul Abbott** (3–9)	Carlos Zambrano (9–6)	**Tim Worrell** (10)	44,493	51–46
98	July 25	Cubs	3–2	**Ryan Madson** (7–2)	LaTroy Hawkins (2–3)	None	44,539	52–46
99	July 26	@ Marlins	3–11	A. J. Burnett (2–5)	**Kevin Millwood** (8–6)	Nate Bump (1)	13,507	52–47
100	July 27	@ Marlins	2–5	Carl Pavano (11–4)	**Rhéal Cormier** (4–4)	Josías Manzanillo (1)	15,523	52–48
101	July 28	@ Marlins	3–6	Josías Manzanillo (3–2)	**Tim Worrell** (3–4)	None	17,404	52–49
102	July 29	@ Marlins	1–10	Dontrelle Willis (8–6)	**Paul Abbott** (3–10)	None	20,391	52–50
103	July 30	@ Cubs	7–10	Jon Leicester (3–0)	**Rhéal Cormier** (4–5)	LaTroy Hawkins (15)	39,117	52–51
104	July 31	@ Cubs	4–3	**Kevin Millwood** (9–6)	Matt Clement (8–10)	**Tim Worrell** (11)	39,086	53–51

August (12–16)

#	Date	Opponent	Score	Win	Loss	Save	Attendance	Record
105	August 1	@ Cubs	3–6	Kent Mercker (2–0)	**Randy Wolf** (4–7)	LaTroy Hawkins (16)	39,032	53–52
106	August 3	@ Padres	5–2	**Brett Myers** (6–8)	Brian Lawrence (11–8)	None	37,134	54–52
107	August 4	@ Padres	7–5	**Eric Milton** (12–2)	Adam Eaton (6–10)	**Tim Worrell** (12)	30,085	55–52
108	August 5	@ Padres	5–3 (10)	**Félix Rodríguez** (4–5)	Trevor Hoffman (2–2)	**Tim Worrell** (13)	36,127	56–52
109	August 6	@ Dodgers	9–5 (11)	**Roberto Hernández** (2–3)	Éric Gagné (4–1)	None	53,977	57–52
110	August 7	@ Dodgers	3–6	Odalis Pérez (5–4)	**Paul Abbott** (3–11)	Éric Gagné (33)	54,404	57–53
111	August 8	@ Dodgers	4–1	**Brett Myers** (7–8)	Brad Penny (9–9)	None	53,840	58–53
112	August 9	Rockies	2–4	Tim Harikkala (5–2)	**Todd Jones** (8–3)	Shawn Chacón (27)	42,031	58–54
113	August 10	Rockies	4–5	Steve Reed (3–2)	**Tim Worrell** (3–5)	Shawn Chacón (28)	36,636	58–55
114	August 11	Rockies	15–4	**Randy Wolf** (5–7)	Jason Jennings (10–10)	None	40,634	59–55
115	August 12	Rockies	1–3	Shawn Estes (13–4)	**Cory Lidle** (7–11)	Shawn Chacón (29)	37,464	59–56
116	August 13	Giants	6–16	Brad Hennessey (1–1)	**Brett Myers** (7–9)	None	43,036	59–57
117	August 14	Giants	6–7	Jason Christiansen (2–2)	**Félix Rodríguez** (4–6)	Dustin Hermanson (2)	43,712	59–58
118	August 15	Giants	1–3	Brett Tomko (6–6)	**Vicente Padilla** (4–6)	Dustin Hermanson (3)	43,610	59–59
119	August 17	Astros	0–5	Roy Oswalt (13–8)	**Randy Wolf** (5–8)	None	43,716	59–60
120	August 18	Astros	8–9	Chad Harville (1–2)	**Todd Jones** (8–4)	Brad Lidge (14)	43,895	59–61
121	August 19	Astros	10–12	Chad Qualls (1–0)	**Roberto Hernández** (2–4)	Brad Lidge (15)	43,543	59–62
122	August 20	@ Brewers	4–2	**Eric Milton** (13–2)	Doug Davis (10–10)	**Tim Worrell** (14)	22,559	60–62
123	August 21	@ Brewers	8–6	**Geoff Geary** (1–0)	Luis Vizcaíno (4–3)	**Tim Worrell** (15)	30,841	61–62
124	August 22	@ Brewers	9–6 (10)	**Félix Rodríguez** (5–6)	Dan Kolb (0–3)	**Tim Worrell** (16)	32,411	62–62
125	August 23	@ Astros	4–8	Roger Clemens (13–4)	**Cory Lidle** (7–12)	None	36,398	62–63
126	August 24	@ Astros	2–4	Roy Oswalt (14–9)	**Todd Jones** (8–5)	Brad Lidge (16)	37,127	62–64
127	August 25	@ Astros	4–7	Chad Qualls (2–0)	**Félix Rodríguez** (5–7)	Brad Lidge (17)	37,217	62–65
128	August 27	Brewers	6–1	**Vicente Padilla** (5–6)	Víctor Santos (10–9)	None	40,367	63–65
129	August 28	Brewers	4–3	**Tim Worrell** (4–5)	Mike Adams (2–2)	None	43,267	64–65
130	August 29	Brewers	10–0	**Cory Lidle** (8–12)	Wes Obermueller (4–7)	None	43,339	65–65
131	August 30	@ White Sox	8–9	Mark Buehrle (12–8)	**Roberto Hernández** (2–5)	Shingo Takatsu (14)	5,747	65–66
132	August 31	Braves	3–5	Mike Hampton (11–9)	**Eric Milton** (13–3)	None	36,028	65–67

September (19–8)

#	Date	Opponent	Score	Win	Loss	Save	Attendance	Record
133	September 1	Braves	2–7	Jaret Wright (14–6)	**Vicente Padilla** (5–7)	None	35,031	65–68
134	September 3	Mets	8–1	**Gavin Floyd** (1–0)	Heath Bell (0–2)	None	37,267	66–68
135	September 4	Mets	7–0	**Cory Lidle** (9–12)	Al Leiter (9–6)	None	43,089	67–68
136	September 5	Mets	4–2	**Brett Myers** (8–9)	Steve Trachsel (10–13)	**Tim Worrell** (17)	43,628	68–68
137	September 6	@ Braves	1–3	Travis Smith (1–3)	**Eric Milton** (13–4)	John Smoltz (36)	31,949	68–69
–	September 7	@ Braves	Postponed (rain); Makeup: September 8 as a traditional double-header					
138	September 8 (1)	@ Braves	5–3	**Ryan Madson** (8–2)	Chris Reitsma (6–4)	**Billy Wagner** (17)	see 2nd game	69–69
139	September 8 (2)	@ Braves	4–1	**Todd Jones** (9–5)	Paul Byrd (6–5)	**Tim Worrell** (18)	20,320	70–69
140	September 9	@ Braves	9–4	**Ryan Madson** (9–2)	Román Colón (1–1)	None	20,285	71–69
141	September 10	@ Mets	9–5	**Todd Jones** (10–5)	Ricky Bottalico (3–2)	None	27,827	72–69
142	September 11	@ Mets	11–9 (13)	**Roberto Hernández** (3–5)	Vic Darensbourg (0–1)	**Félix Rodríguez** (1)	21,718	73–69
143	September 12	@ Mets	4–2	**Vicente Padilla** (6–7)	Tom Glavine (9–13)	**Tim Worrell** (19)	23,391	74–69
144	September 13	@ Reds	3–4	Joe Valentine (2–3)	**Félix Rodríguez** (5–8)	Danny Graves (39)	15,930	74–70
145	September 14	@ Reds	6–7	Ryan Wagner (3–1)	**Ryan Madson** (9–3)	Danny Graves (40)	15,364	74–71
146	September 15	@ Reds	9–1	**Brett Myers** (9–9)	Brandon Claussen (2–5)	None	16,292	75–71
147	September 17	Expos	8–12	Luis Ayala (6–11)	**Tim Worrell** (4–6)	None	35,498	75–72
148	September 18	Expos	5–6 (14)	Chad Cordero (6–4)	**Brett Myers** (9–10)	Francis Beltrán (1)	38,650	75–73
149	September 19	Expos	7–2	**Gavin Floyd** (2–0)	Scott Downs (3–6)	None	42,603	76–73
150	September 21	@ Marlins	4–2	**Cory Lidle** (10–12)	Dontrelle Willis (10–10)	**Billy Wagner** (18)	15,659	77–73
151	September 22	@ Marlins	12–4	**Eric Milton** (14–4)	Logan Kensing (0–3)	None	20,416	78–73
152	September 23	@ Marlins	9–8 (10)	**Billy Wagner** (4–0)	Armando Benítez (2–2)	**Todd Jones** (2)	30,208	79–73
153	September 24	@ Expos	1–8	Sun-Woo Kim (4–5)	**Brett Myers** (9–11)	None	5,481	79–74
154	September 25	@ Expos	4–3 (10)	**Tim Worrell** (5–6)	Joey Eischen (0–1)	**Billy Wagner** (19)	8,491	80–74
155	September 26	@ Expos	2–1	**Cory Lidle** (11–12)	Liván Hernández (11–15)	**Billy Wagner** (20)	12,382	81–74
156	September 27	Pirates	1–6	Óliver Pérez (11–10)	**Eric Milton** (14–5)	None	30,268	81–75
–	September 28	Pirates	Postponed (rain); Makeup: September 29 as a traditional double-header					
157	September 29 (1)	Pirates	8–4	**Vicente Padilla** (7–7)	Ian Snell (0–1)	None	see 2nd game	82–75
158	September 29 (2)	Pirates	8–3	**Brett Myers** (10–11)	Salomón Torres (7–7)	None	33,127	83–75
159	September 30	Marlins	7–4	**Todd Jones** (11–5)	Guillermo Mota (9–8)	**Billy Wagner** (21)	36,080	84–75

October (2–1)

#	Date	Opponent	Score	Win	Loss	Save	Attendance	Record
160	October 1	Marlins	6–2	**Cory Lidle** (12–12)	Matt Perisho (5–3)	None	34,494	85–75
161	October 2	Marlins	3–4	Josh Beckett (9–9)	**Eric Milton** (14–6)	Armando Benítez (47)	36,279	85–76
162	October 3	Marlins	10–4	**Brett Myers** (11–11)	Ismael Valdez (14–9)	None	43,560	86–76

=== Roster ===
2004 Philadelphia Phillies
**Roster**
**Pitchers**: 40 Paul Abbott; 37 Rhéal Cormier; 75 Jim Crowell; 41 Gavin Floyd; 56 Geoff Geary; 50 Josh Hancock; 35 Roberto Hernández; 59 Todd Jones; 30 Cory Lidle; 63 Ryan Madson; 34 Kevin Millwood; 21 Eric Milton; 39 Brett Myers; 44 Vicente Padilla; 51 Brian Powell; 46 Elizardo Ramírez; 47 Félix Rodríguez; 47,57 Amaury Telemaco; 13 Billy Wagner; 43 Randy Wolf; 38 Tim Worrell	**Catchers**: 2 A. J. Hinch; 24 Mike Lieberthal; 3 Todd Pratt; **Infielders**: 4 David Bell; 12 Ryan Howard; 9 Tomás Pérez; 27 Plácido Polanco; 11 Jimmy Rollins; 25 Jim Thome; 26 Chase Utley; 23 Shawn Wooten	**Outfielders**: 53 Bobby Abreu; 5 Pat Burrell; 29 Marlon Byrd; 58 Lou Collier; 6 Doug Glanville; 33 Ricky Ledée; 22 Jason Michaels	**Manager**: 10 Larry Bowa; **Coaches**: 21 Greg Gross (hitting); 59 Ramon Henderson (bullpen); 16 Joe Kerrigan (pitching); 15 Milt Thompson (first base); 25 Gary Varsho (bench); 18 John Vukovich (third base)

== Player stats ==
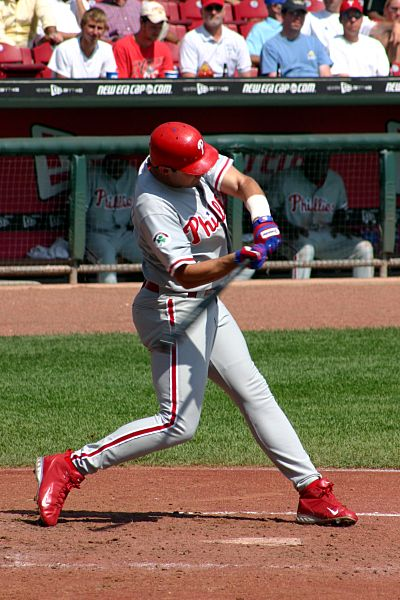
Pat Burrell with the Phillies, September 2004

=== Batting ===
==== Starters by position ====
Note: Pos = Position; G = Games played; AB = At bats; H = Hits; Avg. = Batting average; HR = Home runs; RBI = Runs batted in

Pos	Player	G	AB	H	Avg.	HR	RBI
C	Mike Lieberthal	131	476	129	.271	17	61
1B	Jim Thome	143	508	139	.274	42	105
2B	Plácido Polanco	126	503	150	.298	17	55
SS	Jimmy Rollins	154	657	190	.289	14	73
3B	David Bell	143	533	155	.291	18	77
LF	Pat Burrell	127	448	115	.257	24	84
CF	Marlon Byrd	106	346	79	.228	5	33
RF	Bobby Abreu	159	574	173	.301	30	105

==== Other batters ====
Note: G = Games played; AB = At bats; H = Hits; Avg. = Batting average; HR = Home runs; RBI = Runs batted in

Player	G	AB	H	Avg.	HR	RBI
Jason Michaels	115	299	82	.274	10	40
Chase Utley	94	267	71	.266	13	57
Tomás Pérez	86	176	38	.216	6	21
Doug Glanville	87	162	34	.210	2	14
Todd Pratt	45	128	33	.258	3	16
Ricky Ledée	73	123	35	.285	7	26
Shawn Wooten	33	53	9	.170	0	2
Ryan Howard	19	39	11	.282	2	5
Lou Collier	32	36	10	.278	1	4
A. J. Hinch	4	11	2	.182	0	0

=== Pitching ===
==== Starting pitchers ====
Note: G = Games pitched; IP = Innings pitched; W = Wins; L = Losses; ERA = Earned run average; SO = Strikeouts

Player	G	IP	W	L	ERA	SO
Eric Milton	34	201.0	14	6	4.75	161
Brett Myers	32	176.0	11	11	5.52	116
Kevin Millwood	25	141.0	9	6	4.85	125
Randy Wolf	23	136.2	5	8	4.28	89
Vicente Padilla	20	115.1	7	7	4.53	82
Corey Lidle	10	62.1	5	2	3.90	33
Paul Abbott	10	49.0	1	6	6.24	21

==== Other pitchers ====
Note: G = Games pitched; IP = Innings pitched; W = Wins; L = Losses; ERA = Earned run average; SO = Strikeouts

Player	G	IP	W	L	ERA	SO
Brian Powell	17	39.1	1	2	5.03	24
Gavin Floyd	6	28.1	2	0	3.49	24
Josh Hancock	4	9.0	0	1	9.00	5

==== Relief pitchers ====
Note: G = Games pitched; W = Wins; L = Losses; SV = Saves; ERA = Earned run average; SO = Strikeouts

Player	G	W	L	SV	ERA	SO
Billy Wagner	45	4	0	21	2.42	59
Rhéal Cormier	84	4	5	0	3.56	46
Tim Worrell	77	5	6	19	3.68	64
Roberto Hernández	63	3	5	0	4.76	44
Ryan Madson	52	9	3	1	2.34	55
Amaury Telemaco	42	0	2	0	4.31	32
Geoff Geary	33	1	0	0	5.44	30
Todd Jones	27	3	3	1	4.97	22
Félix Rodríguez	23	2	3	1	3.00	28
Elizardo Ramírez	7	0	0	0	4.80	9
Jim Crowell	4	0	0	0	3.00	1

== Farm system ==
Level	Team	League	Manager
AAA	Scranton/Wilkes-Barre; Red Barons	International League	Marc Bombard
AA	Reading Phillies	Eastern League	Greg Legg
A	Clearwater Threshers	Florida State League	Mike Schmidt
A	Lakewood BlueClaws	South Atlantic League	P. J. Forbes
A-Short Season	Batavia Muckdogs	New York–Penn League	Luis Meléndez
Rookie	GCL Phillies	Gulf Coast League	Roly de Armas
