= Larry Bowa =

American baseball player, coach, and manager (born 1945)

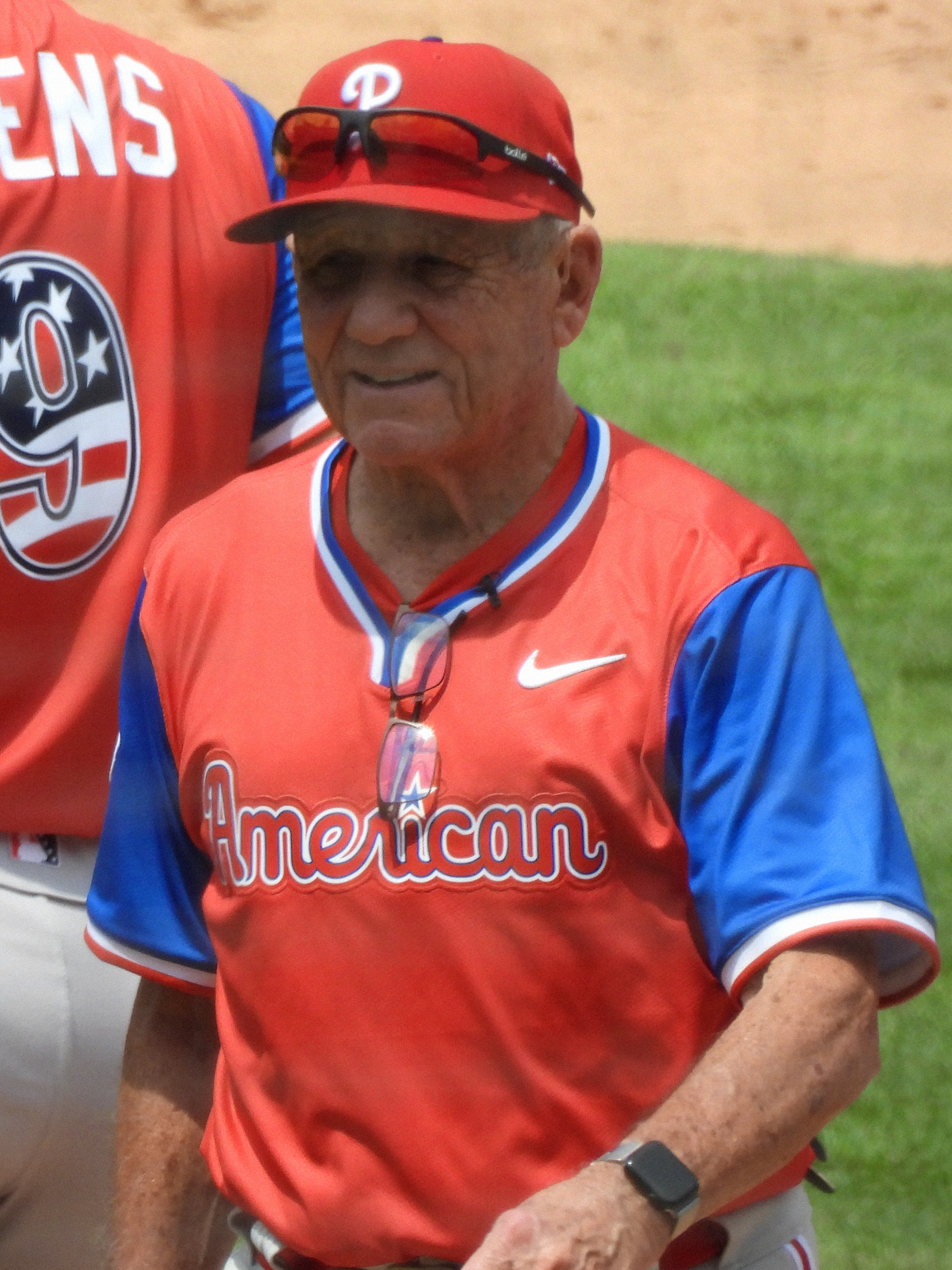
- Bowa at the All-Star Futures Game in 2026
- Shortstop / Manager
- Born: December 6, 1945 (age 80); Sacramento, California, U.S.
- Batted: Switch Threw: Right

MLB debut
- April 7, 1970, for the Philadelphia Phillies

Last MLB appearance
- October 6, 1985, for the New York Mets

MLB statistics
- Batting average: .260
- Hits: 2,191
- Home runs: 15
- Runs batted in: 525
- Managerial record: 418–435
- Winning %: .490
- Stats at Baseball Reference
- Managerial record at Baseball Reference

Teams
- As player: Philadelphia Phillies (1970–1981); Chicago Cubs (1982–1985); New York Mets (1985); As manager: San Diego Padres (1987–1988); Philadelphia Phillies (2001–2004); As coach: Philadelphia Phillies (1988–1996); Anaheim Angels (1997–1999); Seattle Mariners (2000); New York Yankees (2006–2007); Los Angeles Dodgers (2008–2010); Philadelphia Phillies (2014–2017)

Career highlights and awards
- 5× All-Star (1974–1976, 1978, 1979); World Series champion (1980); 2× Gold Glove Award (1972, 1978); NL Manager of the Year (2001); Philadelphia Phillies Wall of Fame

Lawrence Robert Bowa (born December 6, 1945) is an American former professional baseball shortstop, manager, and coach in Major League Baseball (MLB). He played professionally for the Philadelphia Phillies, Chicago Cubs, and the New York Mets. Bowa went on to manage the San Diego Padres and Phillies.

== Early life ==
Bowa was born in Sacramento, California, the son of Paul Bowa, a former minor-league infielder and manager in the St. Louis Cardinals farm system. While at C. K. McClatchy High School, Bowa tried out but never made the school's baseball team. After graduation, Bowa went to Sacramento City College where he started, and was expected to go in the MLB draft, but didn't. The Philadelphia Phillies were the only Major League team interested in Bowa. They sent a local scout, Eddie Bockman, to watch Bowa play in a doubleheader, only for Bowa to be thrown out of both games for arguing. Bockman had a winter league team in the area and offered Bowa a chance to play. Bowa played well and signed with the Phillies for a $2,000 bonus. After 4 years in the minors, he made the Phillies' roster at the age of 24 in 1970.

== Professional career ==
Bowa won two Gold Glove Awards and led the National League (NL) in fielding percentage six times, then a league record. He retired with the NL record for career games at shortstop (2222) and was also among the career leaders in assists (sixth, 6857) and double plays (fourth, 1265); Bowa's records have since been broken, though he retains the NL mark for career fielding percentage. Apart from his fielding achievements, Bowa was a switch-hitter, batting .280 or better four times (.305 in 1975); he also had nine seasons with 20 or more stolen bases.

=== Philadelphia Phillies (1970–1981) ===
From his 1970 rookie season through 1981, Bowa provided solid reliability in the Phillies' infield, along with third baseman Mike Schmidt; from 1976 to 1981, the Phillies reached the postseason five times, ending a drought dating back a quarter of a century. In 1978, Bowa had one of his most productive seasons, hitting .294 and leading NL shortstops with a .986 fielding percentage while finishing third in NL MVP voting. He batted .333 in a losing cause in the 1978 NLCS, but played an even greater role in 1980, hitting .316 in the NLCS and .375 in the World Series, as the Phillies captured the first title in franchise history. In 1979, Bowa set a Major League record for shortstops with a .991 fielding average; Tony Fernández broke the record with a .992 mark in 1989, and Rey Ordóñez broke the NL record with a .994 average in 1999. Bowa tied Ozzie Smith for the most post-1930 seasons with at least 400 at-bats and no home runs, with six.

=== Chicago Cubs (1982–1985) ===
By the end of the 1981 season, Bowa had worn out his welcome with the Phillies' front office, and let it be known he was available. The Chicago Cubs, who had just hired former Phillies manager Dallas Green as general manager, quickly expressed interest. However, Green, who had managed the 1980 world champions, knew that Bowa didn't have many years left and demanded a young rookie third baseman named Ryne Sandberg as a part of the trade. In return, the Phillies received shortstop Iván DeJesús. The trade paid off tremendously for the Cubs, as Bowa's veteran leadership and Sandberg's outstanding all-around play (en route to a Hall of Fame career) brought the Cubs to the postseason in 1984 for the first time in 39 years.

At the beginning of the 1985 season, Bowa lost the Cubs' starting shortstop job to veteran journeyman Chris Speier and eventually to their 1982 first-round draft pick, Shawon Dunston, which left the 39-year-old Bowa discontented with the Cubs' organization. After becoming the San Diego Padres' manager in 1987, Bowa vented his frustrations with the Cubs in an autobiography, titled Bleep!

=== New York Mets (1985) ===
After being released by the Cubs in August 1985, he played the last month of the season with the New York Mets, before retiring.

Bowa was a .260 career hitter with 15 home runs, 525 RBI, 2,191 hits, 987 runs, 262 doubles, 99 triples, and 318 stolen bases in 2,247 games. His NL records for career games at shortstop and most years leading the league in fielding were later broken by Ozzie Smith; Bowa's Major League record for career fielding average has been broken by Omar Vizquel.

== Managerial and coaching career ==
=== San Diego Padres (1987–1988) ===
After retiring, Bowa was named manager of the Las Vegas Stars, the Triple-A affiliate of the San Diego Padres, for the 1986 season. In Bowa's only season at the helm, the Stars went 80–62 en route to the Pacific Coast League championship.

Bowa was hired to manage the Padres on October 28, 1986, a little over a year after playing in his final MLB game. His aggressive and often angry style combined with an extremely young and inexperienced roster led to a down 1987 season in San Diego, and when higher expectations for the 1988 team (mainly engendered by those young players showing greatly improved performances in the 2nd half of the 1987 season and the 1988 spring training slate) were not met, he was fired on May 28, 1988, with an overall record of 81–127 as the club's skipper.

=== First stint with the Philadelphia Phillies (1989–1996) ===
Bowa returned to the Phillies as the team's third base coach on August 11, 1988 and remained there through the 1996 season. In 1993, he and John Vukovich became the first two Phillies in franchise history to go to the World Series with the club as both a player and coach (Vukovich was Bowa's teammate on the 1980 World Champions and was the bench coach for the '93 National League champs. Milt Thompson, an outfielder for the 1993 club, would become the third member of this group when he served as hitting coach for the 2008 World Champions and 2009 National League Champions).

When Jim Fregosi was fired as Phillies manager following the 1996 season, Bowa was one of the candidates to interview for the vacant position, which ultimately went to Terry Francona.

=== Anaheim Angels (1997–1999) and Seattle Mariners (2000) ===
Bowa then joined the Anaheim Angels as their third base coach, where he served from 1997 to 1999 before spending the 2000 season in the same capacity with the Seattle Mariners.

=== Second stint with the Philadelphia Phillies (2001–2004) ===
After being passed over for the job four years earlier, Bowa was named manager of the Phillies on November 1, 2000. Taking over a team that had gone 65–97 in 2000, Bowa led the club to a surprising 86–76 mark in 2001, two games behind the National League East champion Atlanta Braves. Bowa was honored as National League Manager of the Year and also received the Sporting News NL Manager of the Year Award that year. In addition, he was voted the Baseball Prospectus Internet Baseball Awards NL Manager of the Year in 2001.

Despite a promising first season at the helm, Bowa's Phillies could never quite build off the 2001 club's surprising success. A disappointing 80–81 campaign in 2002 would be the franchise's last losing season until 2013. The 2003 and 2004 seasons saw the Phillies finish with similar records of 86–76, and the former season was marked by considerable turmoil with Bowa having clashes with such players as Tyler Houston and Pat Burrell. Though respectable, much more was expected from the club in those latter two campaigns and Bowa was fired with two games remaining in the 2004 season after failing to reach the postseason or finish within 10 games of first place in his last three years. Bowa's managerial record with the Phillies was 337–308.

=== New York Yankees (2006–2007) and Los Angeles Dodgers (2008–2010) ===
After a one-year absence, Bowa returned to the field as third base coach for the New York Yankees in 2006, a position he held for two seasons.

On November 5, 2007, the Los Angeles Dodgers hired Bowa to be the team's third base coach, following the hire of new manager Joe Torre, under whom Bowa had served with the Yankees. Torre became the seventh manager to have Bowa on his staff as third base coach, following Lee Elia, John Vukovich, Nick Leyva, Jim Fregosi, Terry Collins, and Lou Piniella. The Dodgers won consecutive National League West titles in 2008 and 2009, but in both seasons were eliminated in five games in the NLCS by the Phillies, managed by Bowa's permanent successor in Philadelphia, Charlie Manuel.

The conclusion of Bowa's tenure with the Dodgers coincided with Torre's retirement at the end of the 2010 season.

=== Third stint with the Philadelphia Phillies (2014–2017) ===
Bowa reunited with Joe Torre and served as his bench coach for the USA team in the 2013 World Baseball Classic.

Bowa returned to Major League Baseball and the Phillies by joining Ryne Sandberg's staff as bench coach for the 2014 season. Bowa remained with the Phillies as bench coach under Pete Mackanin, who took over after Sandberg resigned during the 2015 season.

Bowa was relieved of his coaching duties on October 13, 2017, and accepted the role as Matt Klentak's senior advisor to the general manager.

On July 2, 2026, Bowa was announced as the manager for the American League at the All-Star Futures Game.

== Broadcasting career ==
=== ESPN and XM radio ===
Bowa spent the 2005 season as an analyst for ESPN's Baseball Tonight and co-hosted a baseball talk show on XM Radio.

After leaving the Dodgers, Bowa was a studio analyst for the MLB Network from 2011 to 2013, regularly appearing on the network's daily studio show "MLB Tonight." He also hosted a weekly show during the baseball season with Chris Russo on Sirius XM while occasionally providing postgame analysis for Phillies games on WPHL.

== Managerial record ==
Team	Year	Regular season					Postseason			
Team	Year	Games	Won	Lost	Win %	Finish	Won	Lost	Win %	Result
SD	1987	162	65	97	.401	6th in NL West	–	–	–	–
SD	1988	46	16	30	.348	Fired*	–	–	–	–
SD total		208	81	127	.389		–	–	–	
PHI	2001	162	86	76	.531	2nd in NL East	–	–	–	–
PHI	2002	161	80	81	.497	3rd in NL East	–	–	–	–
PHI	2003	162	86	76	.531	3rd in NL East	–	–	–	–
PHI	2004	160	85	75	.531	Fired*	–	–	–	–
PHI total		645	337	308	.522		–	–	–	
Total		853	418	435	.490		–	–	–	

== See also ==
- List of Major League Baseball annual triples leaders
- List of Major League Baseball career hits leaders
- List of Major League Baseball career stolen bases leaders

Preceded by John Vukovich	Philadelphia Phillies Third Base Coach; 1988–1996	Succeeded by John Vukovich
Preceded by Eddie Rodriguez	Anaheim Angels Third Base Coach; 1997–1999	Succeeded by Ron Roenicke
Preceded by Steve Smith	Seattle Mariners Third Base Coach; 2000	Succeeded by Dave Myers
Preceded by Luis Sojo	New York Yankees Third Base Coach; 2006–2007	Succeeded by Bobby Meacham
Preceded by Rich Donnelly	Los Angeles Dodgers Third Base Coach; 2008–2010	Succeeded by Tim Wallach
Preceded by Ryne Sandberg	Philadelphia Phillies Bench Coach; 2014–2017	Succeeded by Rob Thomson
