= Brian Powell (baseball) =

American baseball player (1973–2009)

- Pitcher
- Born: October 10, 1973; Bainbridge, Georgia, U.S.
- Died: October 5, 2009 (aged 35); Tallahassee, Florida, U.S.
- Batted: Right Threw: Right

MLB debut
- June 27, 1998, for the Detroit Tigers

Last MLB appearance
- September 24, 2004, for the Philadelphia Phillies

MLB statistics
- Win–loss record: 7–18
- Earned run average: 5.94
- Strikeouts: 120
- Stats at Baseball Reference

Teams
- Detroit Tigers (1998); Houston Astros (2000–2001); Detroit Tigers (2002); San Francisco Giants (2003); Philadelphia Phillies (2004)

William Brian Powell (October 10, 1973 – October 5, 2009) was an American Major League Baseball pitcher from Bainbridge, Georgia, who played in the majors from 1998 to 2004 for the Detroit Tigers, Houston Astros, Philadelphia Phillies, and San Francisco Giants.

== Career ==
He played collegiate baseball for the University of Georgia and led the Southeastern Conference in strikeouts during the 1995 season.

In 2001, he pitched a no-hitter for the minor league baseball team, New Orleans Zephyrs, then the Houston Astros Triple-A team.

In 2005, he played again for the Zephyrs, then the Triple-A affiliate of the Washington Nationals.

== Death ==
He died on October 5, 2009, in Tallahassee, Florida, of a self-inflicted gunshot wound, just 4 days ahead of his 36th birthday.
