= Josh Labandeira =

American baseball player (born 1979)

- Shortstop
- Born: February 25, 1979 (age 46); Tulare, California, U.S.
- Batted: Right Threw: Right

MLB debut
- September 17, 2004, for the Montreal Expos

Last MLB appearance
- October 3, 2004, for the Montreal Expos

MLB statistics
- Batting average: .000
- Home runs: 0
- Runs batted in: 0
- Stats at Baseball Reference

Teams
- Montreal Expos (2004)

John Joshua Labandeira (born February 25, 1979) is an American former professional baseball player. He played in Major League Baseball for the Montreal Expos during the 2004 season. He played second base/shortstop and batted and threw right-handed.

== Career ==
Labandeira attended Monache High School in Porterville, California, and chose Fresno State University as the college he wished to attend. While at Fresno, he lettered in four different sports: wrestling, soccer, football and baseball. Labandeira majored in kinesiology. As a sophomore, he attended College of the Sequoias in Visalia (Bob Ojeda, Johnny Estrada, Jim Wohlford and Steve Stroughter all attended that college at one point or another as well).

In the 6th round of the 2001 Major League Baseball draft, Labandeira was drafted by the Montreal Expos after posting superlative numbers in college. In 2001, he hit .367 while belting 15 home runs and was a Western Athletic Conference All-Star and the Western Athletic Conference Player of the Year.

On September 17, 2004, Labandeira made his major league debut at the age of 25. In seven games that year, he had a .000 batting average in 14 at-bats. He wore the number 1 during his tenure in the major leagues. He currently ranks 10th on the All-Time list of most career at-bats without a hit by a non-pitcher. The record of 23 is shared by Larry Littleton and Mike Potter.

He spent all of 2005 and 2006 playing for Harrisburg and Washington's Triple-A affiliate, the New Orleans Zephyrs. In July 2005, Labandeira was suspended 15 games for violating the policies in the Minor League Drug Prevention and Treatment Program. In 2007, Labandeira played for the Florida Marlins Triple-A affiliate, the Albuquerque Isotopes. He became a free agent at the end of the season. On April 22, 2008, he signed a minor league contract with the Tampa Bay Rays. He was released on July 26, 2008. On July 31, he signed with the Kansas City Royals and became a free agent at the end of the season.

He is now an assistant coach on the Reedley College Baseball Team and an area scout for the Boston Red Sox based in Northern California.

== Personal life ==
Labandeira was married in January 2007 to college sweetheart, Rebecca Witt and they currently reside in Fresno, California.
