= Luis Ayala (baseball) =

Mexican baseball pitcher (born 1978)

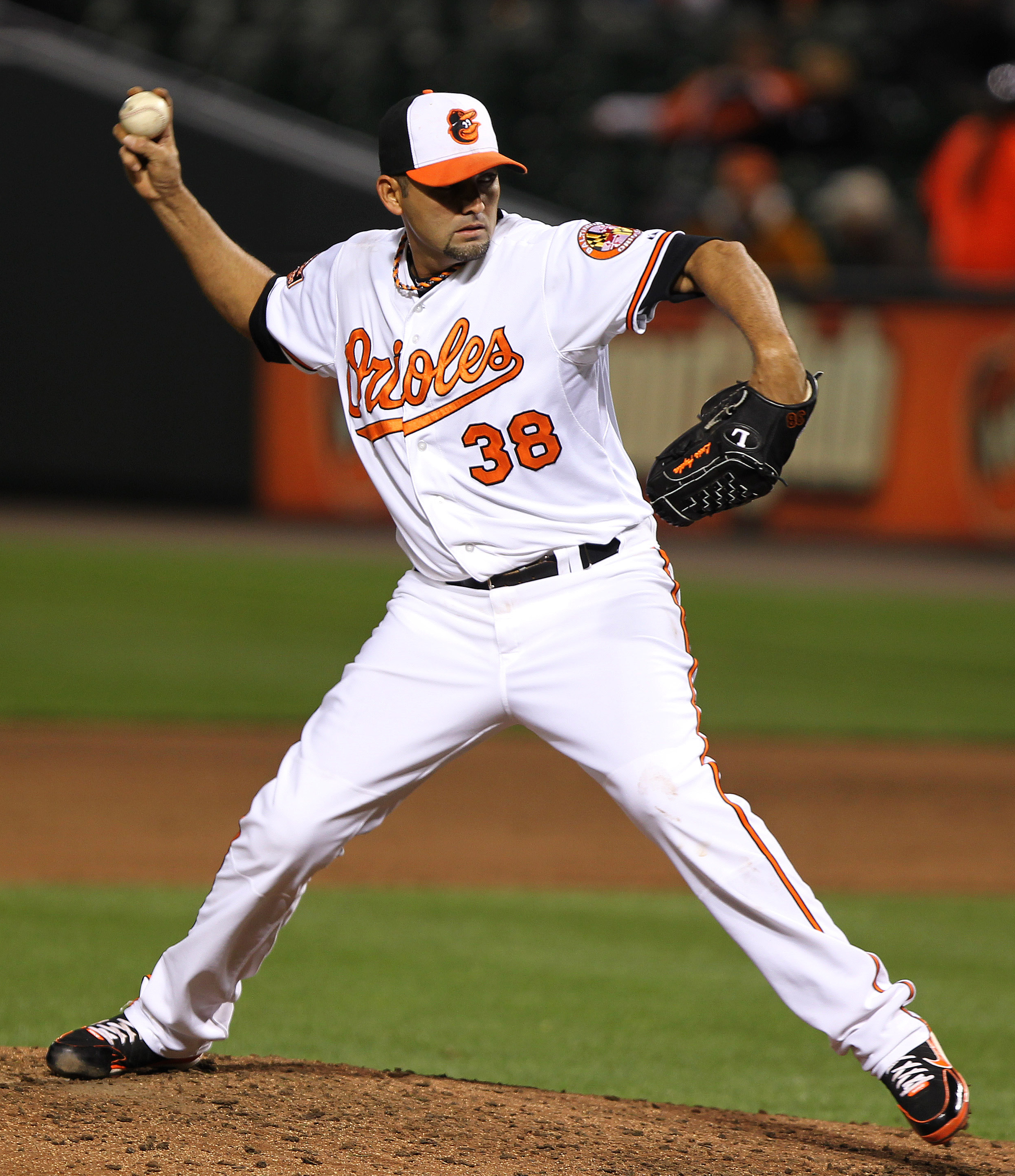
- Ayala with the Baltimore Orioles
- Pitcher
- Born: January 12, 1978 (age 48); Los Mochis, Sinaloa, Mexico
- Batted: Right Threw: Right

MLB debut
- March 31, 2003, for the Montreal Expos

Last MLB appearance
- September 29, 2013, for the Atlanta Braves

MLB statistics
- Win–loss record: 38–47
- Earned run average: 3.34
- Strikeouts: 367
- Stats at Baseball Reference

Teams
- Montreal Expos / Washington Nationals (2003–2005, 2007–2008); New York Mets (2008); Minnesota Twins (2009); Florida Marlins (2009); New York Yankees (2011); Baltimore Orioles (2012–2013); Atlanta Braves (2013)

Luis Ignacio Ayala Hernández (born January 12, 1978) is a Mexican former professional baseball pitcher. He played in Major League Baseball for the Montreal Expos/Washington Nationals, New York Mets, Minnesota Twins, Florida Marlins, New York Yankees, Baltimore Orioles, and Atlanta Braves. He is 6 feet 2 inches (1.88 m) and weighs 190 pounds (86 kg). He bats and throws right-handed.

== Career ==
=== Saraperos de Saltillo ===
In 1997, as a 19-year-old, Ayala started playing in the Mexican League as a relief pitcher. He spent five years with the Saraperos de Saltillo, where he was 10–3 with a 2.92 earned run average (ERA). in 65 games. He was signed as an undrafted free agent by the Colorado Rockies in 1999 and spent time with their Single-A team before the Rockies sold him back to Saltillo in 2001..

=== Montreal Expos / Washington Nationals ===
In 2002, he was purchased from Saltillo by the Montreal Expos. He played with the Triple-A Ottawa Lynx in 2002. At the end of the 2002 season, he was signed by the Arizona Diamondbacks, but two months later returned to the Expos as a Rule 5 pick.

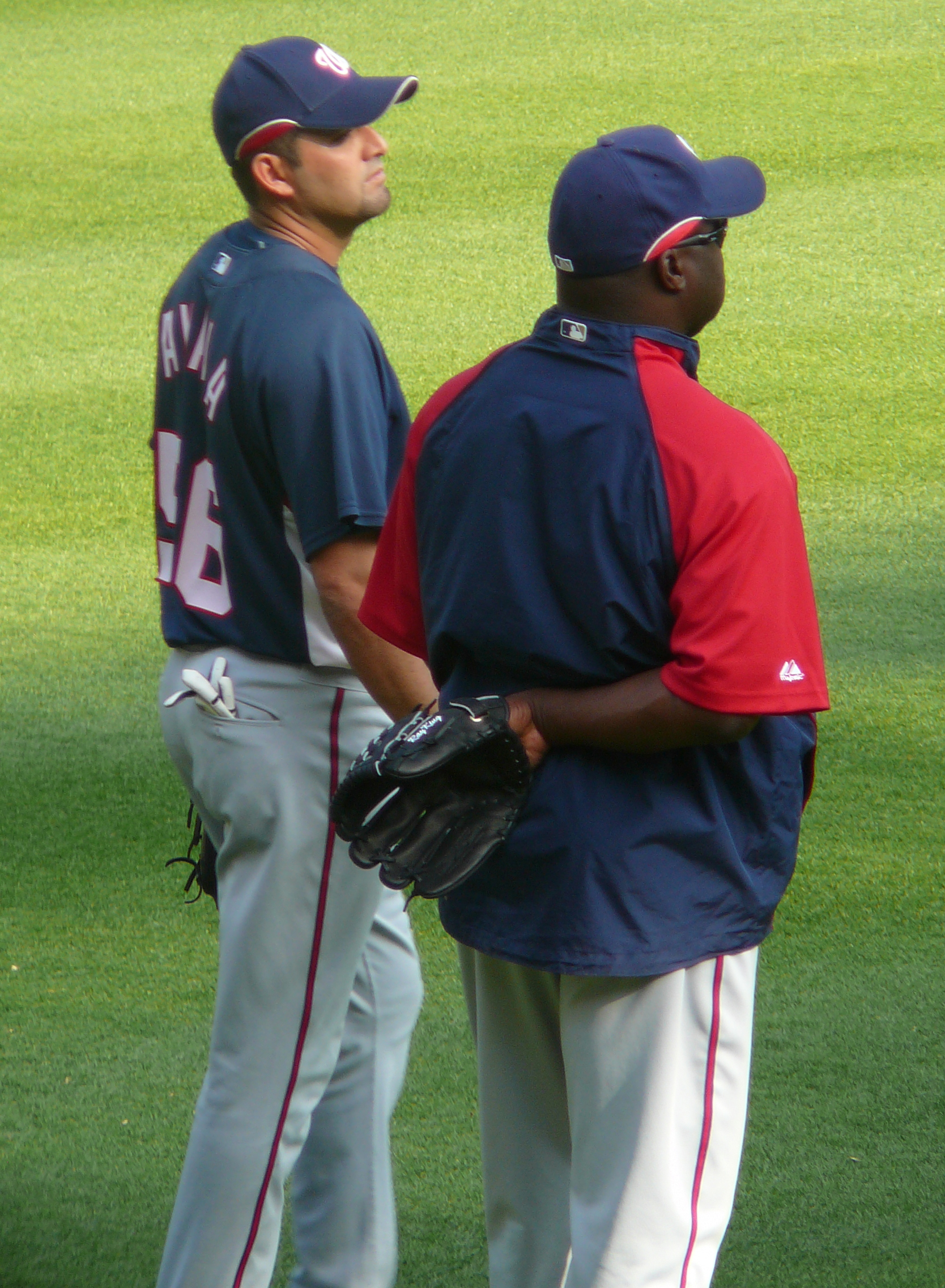
Ayala (left) talks to teammate Ray King in 2008.

Ayala made his major league debut on March 31, 2003, for the Expos against the Atlanta Braves, working two innings of relief and allowing one run and four hits. His 10 relief wins that season were tied for 2nd most in MLB. Ayala pitched well for the Expos/Nationals from 2003 through 2005. Over the three years, he averaged 70 appearances per year, and compiled an ERA of 2.75, and led the National League with 62 holds. In 2004 he ranked eighth in appearances with 81.

Ayala injured his elbow on the last pitch of a 2006 World Baseball Classic game. As a result, he underwent Tommy John surgery on March 30, 2006 and was knocked out for the entire 2006 season. Ayala began the 2007 season on the 60-day disabled list due to still recovering from the Tommy John surgery he previously had. After working eight rehab games in the minors, in which he allowed one run in 9-2/3 innings, on June 20, he was called up to the majors. He made his return with the Nationals on June 22, 2007, pitching 2/3 of an inning and giving up no runs and only one hit. For the season, he went 2–2 with 6 holds, one save, and a 3.19 ERA in 44 appearances.

In 2008, Ayala pitched in 62 games for the Nationals, going 1–8 with a 5.77 ERA.

=== New York Mets ===
On August 17, 2008, Ayala was traded to the New York Mets for a player to be named later. Ayala had requested the trade weeks earlier because he wanted a change of scenery, due to personal problems. The Mets sent Anderson Hernández to the Nats to complete the deal. On August 22, 2008, Ayala recorded his first save as a Met in a 3–0 victory over the Houston Astros.

In 19 games for the Mets, Ayala had a 5.50 ERA.

=== Minnesota Twins ===
On February 18, 2009, Ayala signed a one-year deal with the Minnesota Twins. On June 22, Ayala was designated for assignment, and was released on July 2. According to Twins manager Ron Gardenhire, Ayala was released because he was unhappy with his role on the team. Gardenhire said of Ayala: "When you walk into my office and tell me you don't like your role, and he talked about his contract for next year, you lose me right there. I don't deal with that. We're talking about winning now. That's why he's out the door and another guy's in there to pitch. And it's not because he's a bad guy. His theories are a little different."

=== Florida Marlins ===
On July 3, 2009, he signed a minor league deal with the Florida Marlins. He was added to the major league roster on July 12. Ayala was designated for assignment on August 31. In 10 appearances, Ayala went 0–3 with an 11.74 ERA. After being DFA, Ayala said of the Marlins: "It was terrible what they did. I don't know why they called me up if they were going to do this. I think it's a lack of respect. I know it's a business, but for me, it's something they've handled poorly."

=== Los Angeles Dodgers ===
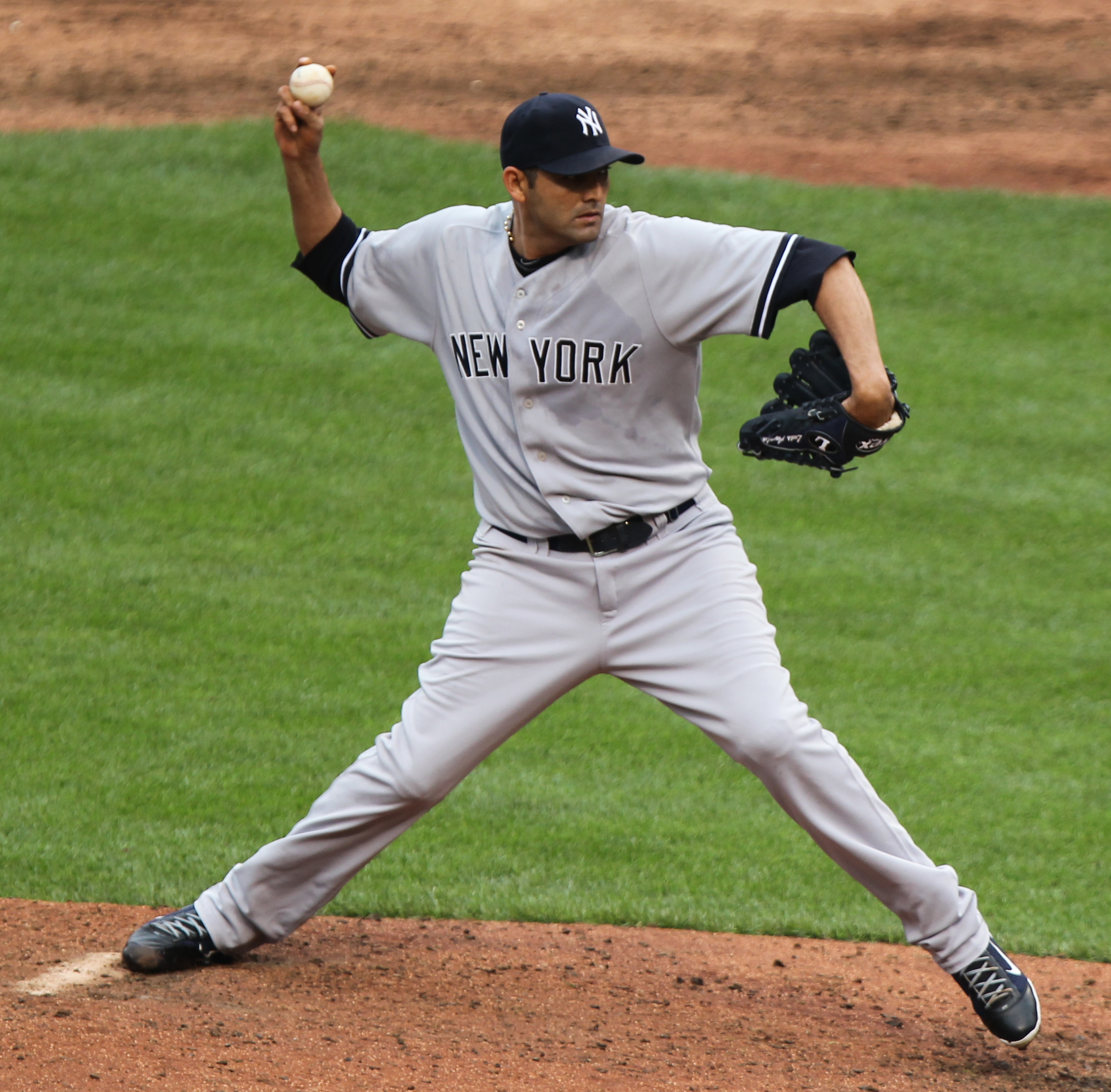
Ayala pitching for the New York Yankees in 2011.

Ayala signed a minor league contract with the Los Angeles Dodgers on December 16, 2009. He was assigned to the Triple-A Albuquerque Isotopes to start the season. He pitched in 14 games for the Isotopes, mostly as a closer. He was 1–3 with a 4.50 ERA and four saves. He was released by the Dodgers on May 17 after he exercised an opt-out clause in his contract.

=== Arizona Diamondbacks ===
On May 20, 2010, Ayala signed a minor league contract with the Arizona Diamondbacks. On July 16, 2010, Ayala was released by the Diamondbacks organization.

=== Colorado Rockies ===
On August 27, 2010, Ayala signed a minor league contract with the Colorado Rockies. On November 22, 2010, Ayala became a minor league free agent.

=== New York Yankees ===
On February 9, 2011, Ayala signed a minor league contract with the New York Yankees. On March 30 it was announced that Ayala had been added to the opening day roster.

=== Baltimore Orioles ===
On February 10, 2012, he signed a one-year major league deal with the Baltimore Orioles.

On October 29, the Orioles announced they intended to exercise their club option on Ayala worth $1 million. Ayala would've earned $1 million from the buyout had the Orioles not exercised the option.

=== Atlanta Braves ===
On April 10, 2013, Ayala was traded to the Atlanta Braves for minor league prospect Chris Jones. He became a free agent following the season.

=== Second Stint with Nationals ===
On February 7, 2014, Ayala signed a minor league deal with the Washington Nationals.

=== Second Stint with Orioles ===
The Nationals granted him his release on March 19, and he re-signed with the Orioles on March 20.

=== Toronto Blue Jays ===
He later exercised an opt out in his contract with the Orioles and signed a minor-league contract with the Toronto Blue Jays on June 6, 2014. He was activated by the Triple-A Buffalo Bisons on June 8, and released on July 4.

=== Olmecas de Tabasco ===
On July 15, 2014, Ayala signed with the Olmecas de Tabasco of the Mexican Baseball League. In 2014 he appeared in 8 games 10 innings of relief he went 0-0 with a 1.80 ERA with 9 strikeouts and 4 saves.

In 2015 he appeared in 51 games 61.2 innings of relief he went 7-4 with a 2.04 ERA with 56 strikeouts and 17 saves.

In 2016 he appeared in 25 games 29 innings of relief he went 3-3 with a 3.41 ERA with 15 strikeouts and 6 saves.

=== Diablos Rojos del Mexico ===
On June 29, 2016, Ayala was loaned to the Diablos Rojos del Mexico of the Mexican Baseball League. He was returned to the Olmecas de Tabasco on September 19. On February 27, 2017, Ayala was loaned back to the Diablos Rojos del Mexico. He was released on April 17.

In 2016 he appeared in 14 games 14 innings of relief going 0-3 with a 3.21 ERA with 8 strikeouts.

In 2017 he appeared in 3 games 2 innings of relief going 0-0 with a 4.50 ERA with 2 strikeouts.

=== Saraperos de Saltillo ===
On June 4, 2017, Ayala signed with the Saraperos de Saltillo of the Mexican Baseball League. He was released on January 18, 2018. In 14 games 12 innings of relief he struggled going 0-2 with a 6.00 ERA with 11 strikeouts.

=== Bravos de León ===
On March 22, 2018, Ayala signed with the Bravos de León of the Mexican Baseball League. He was released on April 20, 2018. In 7 games 5.1 innings of relief he struggled mightily going 0-1 with an 11.81 ERA with 8 strikeouts and 1 save.
