= Chad Bentz =

American baseball player (born 1980)

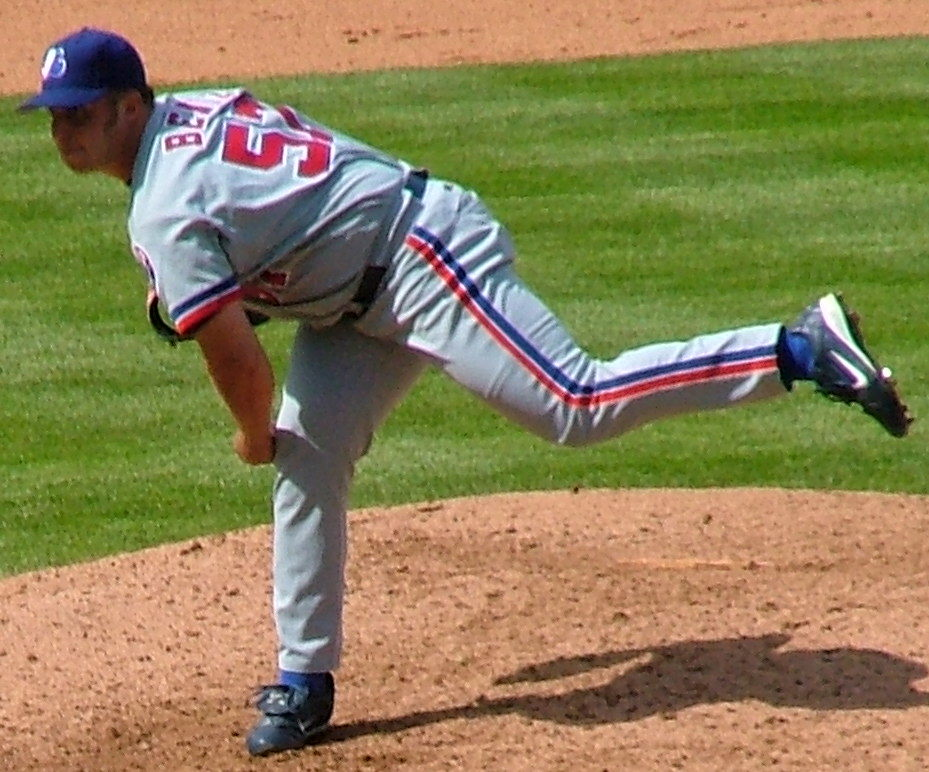
- Bentz with the Montreal Expos in 2004
- Relief pitcher
- Born: May 5, 1980 (age 45); Seward, Alaska, U.S.
- Batted: Right Threw: Left

MLB debut
- April 7, 2004, for the Montreal Expos

Last MLB appearance
- June 21, 2005, for the Florida Marlins

MLB statistics
- Win–loss record: 0–3
- Earned run average: 7.58
- Strikeouts: 18
- Stats at Baseball Reference

Teams
- Montreal Expos (2004); Florida Marlins (2005)

Chad Robert Bentz (born May 5, 1980) is an American former professional baseball pitcher who played in Major League Baseball. Bentz grew up in Juneau, and he made history on April 7, 2004, by becoming the second pitcher, after Jim Abbott, to play in the Major Leagues after being born without one of his hands. Bentz fielded and caught with his glove the same way Abbott did when he played in the 1980s and early 1990s. Like Abbott, Bentz has a deformed right hand. As a freshman in college, Bentz met Abbott who became his mentor.

He played in 36 games for Montreal in 2004, winning none and losing three, with an ERA of 5.86. He played only four games for Florida in 2005, pitching only two innings, and allowing seven earned runs.

Bentz played for the Charlotte Knights (Chicago White Sox Triple-A), Louisville Bats (Cincinnati Reds Triple-A), and Chattanooga Lookouts (Cincinnati Reds Double-A) in 2006. In 2007, Bentz was invited to spring training with the Colorado Rockies, but did not make the team. In 2008, he pitched for the Bridgeport Bluefish of the independent Atlantic League before being released on July 2. He briefly pitched for the American Defenders of New Hampshire of the Canadian American Association of Professional Baseball, but was released June 12, 2009.

In 2010, Bentz joined the football team at Castleton State College in Castleton, Vermont. His weight then up to 265 pounds, Bentz was a running back for the NCAA Division III program. He appeared in nine games that season, gaining 29 yards on 12 carries and scoring twice. Bentz did not return to the program for the 2011 season.

In 2013, Bentz was named pitching coach for the Castleton State baseball program.

Bentz returned to Juneau to be the athletic director and baseball coach at Juneau-Douglas High School in Juneau Alaska. Bentz is married to Caitlyn and has one daughter, Kyla, born in 2004 and twin sons, Riggs and Fisher, born in 2022.
