= Joe Horgan =

American baseball player (born 1977)

- Relief pitcher
- Born: June 7, 1977 (age 49); Sacramento, California, U.S.
- Batted: Left Threw: Left

MLB debut
- June 12, 2004, for the Montreal Expos

Last MLB appearance
- April 23, 2005, for the Washington Nationals

MLB statistics
- Win–loss record: 4–1
- Earned run average: 5.48
- Strikeouts: 35
- Stats at Baseball Reference

Teams
- Montreal Expos / Washington Nationals (2004–2005)

Joseph Paul Horgan (born June 7, 1977) is an American former professional baseball pitcher. He played in Major League Baseball (MLB) for the Montreal Expos / Washington Nationals.

== Career ==
Horgan was born in Sacramento, California. He played at Sacramento City College and graduated from Cordova High School.

He appeared in 47 games for the Montreal Expos in the 2004 season as a relief pitcher and had a record of 4–1 with an ERA of 3.15. He briefly played for the Washington Nationals during the 2005 season. He played his final season for the Triple-A Albuquerque Isotopes of the Pacific Coast League.
