= Matt Perisho =

American baseball player (born 1975)

- Pitcher
- Born: June 8, 1975 (age 50); Burlington, Iowa, U.S.
- Batted: Left Threw: Left

MLB debut
- May 27, 1997, for the Anaheim Angels

Last MLB appearance
- September 2, 2005, for the Boston Red Sox

MLB statistics
- Win–loss record: 11–17
- Earned run average: 6.39
- Strikeouts: 202
- Stats at Baseball Reference

Teams
- Anaheim Angels (1997); Texas Rangers (1998–2000); Detroit Tigers (2001–2002); Florida Marlins (2004–2005); Boston Red Sox (2005)

Matthew Alan Perisho (born June 8, 1975) is an American former professional baseball pitcher in Major League Baseball. He bats and throws left-handed.

== Career ==
In 2008, Perisho played for the Tecolotes de Nuevo Laredo of the Triple-A Mexican League. In 22 starts, he went 6–8 with a 3.93 ERA. When the Mexican League season ended, Perisho signed with the Brother Elephants of the Chinese Professional Baseball League in Taiwan (Republic of China).

Perisho throws a low-90s fastball and a good slider, and he uses a changeup when necessary against right-handed batters. His most productive season came in 2004 for the Florida Marlins, when he made a career-high 66 appearances and posted a 5–3 record with 10 holds in 47.0 innings, and held left-handed hitters to a .207 batting average (18-for-87).
