= Sun-woo Kim =

South Korean baseball player (born 1977)

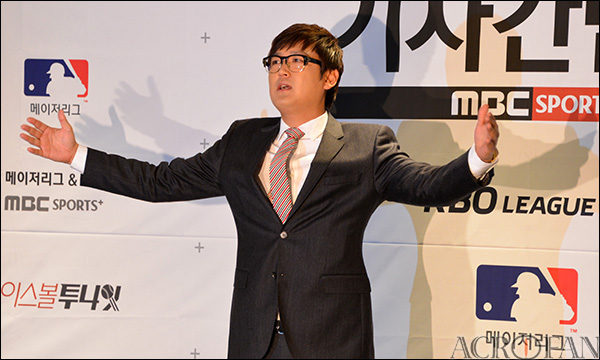
- Pitcher
- Born: September 4, 1977 (age 49); Incheon, South Korea
- Batted: Right Threw: Right

Professional debut
- MLB: June 15, 2001, for the Boston Red Sox
- KBO: April 2, 2008, for the Doosan Bears

Last appearance
- MLB: September 17, 2006, for the Cincinnati Reds
- KBO: October 17, 2014, for the LG Twins

MLB statistics
- Win–loss record: 13–13
- Earned run average: 5.31
- Strikeouts: 211

KBO statistics
- Win–loss record: 57–46
- Earned run average: 4.37
- Strikeouts: 438
- Stats at Baseball Reference

Teams
- Boston Red Sox (2001–2002); Montreal Expos / Washington Nationals (2002–2005); Colorado Rockies (2005–2006); Cincinnati Reds (2006); Doosan Bears (2008–2013); LG Twins (2014)

- Sun-woo Kim
- Hangul: 김선우
- Hanja: 金善宇
- RR: Gim Seonu
- MR: Kim Sŏnu

Sun-woo "Sunny" Kim (Korean: 김선우; Hanja: 金善宇, Korean pronunciation: [kim.sʌn.u]; born September 4, 1977) is a retired South Korean professional baseball pitcher of the Korea Baseball Organization. He has previously played in Major League Baseball for the Boston Red Sox, Montreal Expos/Washington Nationals, Colorado Rockies, and Cincinnati Reds. He bats and throws right-handed.

== Pro career ==
Kim began his MLB career with the Boston Red Sox in 2001 and was traded to the Montreal Expos the next season. In his career, Kim has pitched in 110 games, starting 37, recording 13 wins against 13 losses. He was the starting pitcher of the Montreal Expos at the organization's final game at Montreal on September 29, 2004, lasting just over two innings. On September 24, Kim pitched complete game shut out against San Francisco Giants at Coors Field, leading the team's 6-0 victory.

He was acquired by the Cincinnati Reds on September 5, 2006, from the Colorado Rockies in exchange for future considerations. Kim was released from the Reds after the 2006 season. After playing one season in the minor leagues, he signed with the Doosan Bears in the Korea Baseball Organization at the end of 2007. Kim posted a 57–45 record and a 4.27 ERA in 6 seasons with the Bears. His best season was 2011, when he won 16 games (against 7 losses), pitching 175.2 innings in 28 games with a 3.13 ERA. After a dreadful season in 2013, (5-6, 5.52 ERA and only pitched 60.2 innings due to injury), Kim was waived by the Bears. He then joined the LG Twins, where he played his final season.

== Family ==
Kim is the cousin of Lee Junho, who is a member of the boy band 2PM.
