= 2004 Houston Astros season =

43rd season in Major League Baseball for the Houston Astros

2004 Houston Astros
- National League Wild Card winners
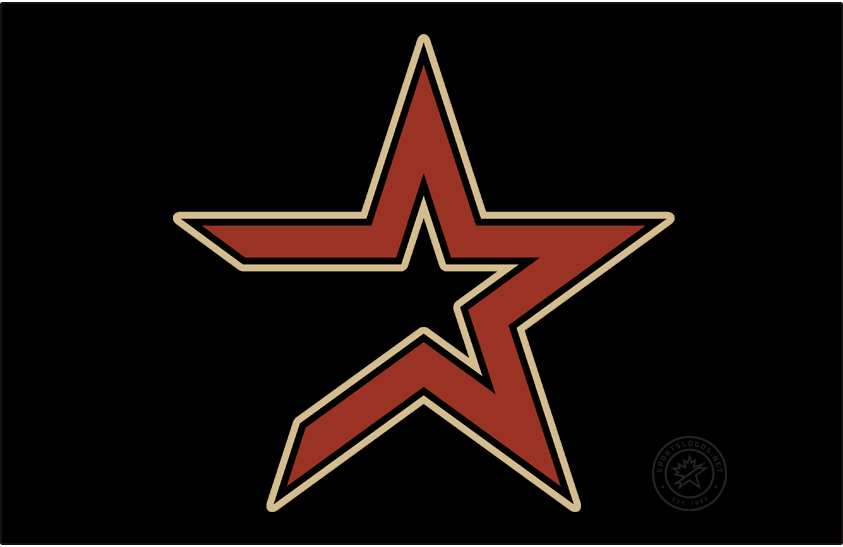
- League: National League
- Division: Central
- Ballpark: Minute Maid Park
- City: Houston, Texas
- Record: 92–70 (.568)
- Divisional place: 2nd
- Owners: Drayton McLane, Jr.
- General managers: Gerry Hunsicker
- Managers: Jimy Williams – 44–44 (.500); Phil Garner – 48–26 (.649)
- Television: KNWS-TV; FSN Southwest (Bill Brown, Larry Dierker, Jim Deshaies, Greg Lucas, Bill Worrell)
- Radio: KTRH (Milo Hamilton, Alan Ashby); KLAT (Francisco Ernesto Ruiz, Alex Treviño)
- Stats: ESPN.com; Baseball Reference

The 2004 Houston Astros season was the 43rd season for the Major League Baseball (MLB) franchise located in Houston, Texas, their 40th as the Astros, 43rd in the National League (NL), 11th in the NL Central division, and fifth at Minute Maid Park. The Astros entered the season with an 87–75 record, in second place and one game behind the division-champion Chicago Cubs. In the NL Wild Card race, the Astros also finished second, four games behind the World Series-champion Florida Marlins.

On April 5, pitcher Roy Oswalt made his second Opening Day starts for the Astros, who hosted the San Francisco Giants, but were defeated, 5–4. On May 6, Roger Clemens moved into second place all-time in strikeouts, increasing his total to 4,140, while on May 8, Craig Biggio became the first Astro to reach 2,500 career hits.

The Astros hosted the MLB All-Star Game at Minute Maid Park, which was the first held in Houston since 1986. Outfielders Carlos Beltrán and Lance Berkman, second baseman Jeff Kent, and Clemens each represented the Astros as All-Stars, and Clemens was selected as the starting pitcher for the National League. Berkman and Kent were also chosen to the starting lineup, accounting for the first time in club history the Astros were represented accordingly.

Having limped into the All-Star break with a 44–44 record, Phil Garner was named manager, the 16th in franchise history, replacing Jimy Williams. On September 18, Jeff Bagwell scored both the 1,500th run and run batted in (RBI) of his career to become the 29th major leaguer and first Astro to reach both milestones. Kent hit his 300th home run on September 29. The Astros won 36 of their final 46 games: 36–10 (.783). The Astros established an all-time franchise record with 3,087,872 in attendance to surpass their 2000 total, when they had reached 3 million for the first time.

Having completed the regular season with a 92–70 record, Houston ranked second in the NL Central, finishing 13 games behind the division-champion St. Louis Cardinals. However, the Astros captured the NL Wild Card title for the first time, finishing just one game ahead of the San Francisco Giants. It was the eighth playoff qualification overall for Houston.

In the National League Division Series (NLDS), the Astros defeated the Atlanta Braves 3-games-to-2 by scoring an NLDS-record 36 runs. Hence, the Astros won a playoff series for the first time in franchise history, while also defeating Atlanta in a playoff series on their fourth attempt. They advanced to the third National League Championship Series (NLCS) in franchise history and first since 1986 to face the Cardinals. Beltrán, who connected for eight home runs between the NLDS and NLCS, tied Barry Bonds' record for one postseason in 2002. (Note: Equaled by Nelson Cruz in 2011 and surpassed in 2020 by Randy Arozarena (10). In 2020, Corey Seager also tied Beltrán, Bonds, and Cruz.) However, the Astros were eliminated in 7 games, ending their season as St. Louis claimed the NL pennant.

Clemens won the NL Cy Young Award, becoming the fourth pitcher to win the award in both leagues, the only one with seven overall, and joined Mike Scott in 1986 as the second Astro to be selected.

== Offseason ==
=== Summary ===
The Astros concluded the 2003 campaign with an 87–75 (.537) record, runners-up in the National League (NL) Central division, and one game behind the division-champion Chicago Cubs. The Astros also finished as runners-up in the NL Wild Card race to the eventual World Series-champion Florida Marlins. Hence, they missed the playoffs by one game. On June 11, 2003, Roy Oswalt, Pete Munro, Kirk Saarloos, Brad Lidge, Octavio Dotel, and Billy Wagner combined to hurl the tenth no-hitter in franchise history, and first combined effort for the team. It was the first in the Major Leagues to involve as many as six pitchers.

=== Transactions ===
- November 3, 2003: Traded Billy Wagner to the Philadelphia Phillies for Brandon Duckworth, Taylor Buchholz, and Ezequiel Astacio.
- December 16, 2003: Signed free agent starting pitcher Andy Pettite.
- December 16, 2003: Selected outfielder Willy Taveras from the Cleveland Indians in the Rule 5 draft.
- January 19, 2004: Signed free agent starting pitcher Roger Clemens.
- March 25, 2004: Traded Juan DeLeon (minors) to the New York Yankees for Mike Lamb.

== Regular season ==
=== Summary ===
==== April ====
Opening Day starter Roy Oswalt loads the winduop.

Opening Day starting lineup
Uniform	Player	Position
7	Craig Biggio	Center fielder
28	Adam Everett	Shortstop
5	Jeff Bagwell	First baseman
12	Jeff Kent	Second baseman
15	Richard Hidalgo	Right fielder
17	Lance Berkman	Left fielder
14	Morgan Ensberg	Third baseman
11	Brad Ausmus	Catcher
44	Roy Oswalt	Pitcher
Venue: Minute Maid Park • San Francisco 5, Houston 4 Sources:

The Astros hosted the San Francisco Giants for Opening Day on April 5, falling in defeat, 5–4. During the top of the ninth inning, Giants first baseman J. T. Snow swatted a sacrifice fly against Astros reliever Octavio Dotel for the game-winning run batted in (RBI). One inning earlier, Barry Bonds drilled a game-tying, three-run home run off Astros starter Roy Oswalt. Bonds also doubled twice and drew a base on balls to reach base four times. Richard Hidalgo collected three hits and went deep for the Astros.

On April 7, a 41-year-old Roger Clemens, also known as "The Rocket," made his Houston Astros debut, to deal to the San Francisco Giants. A memorable debut, Clemens blanked San Francisco for just one hit over seven innings to earn his 311th career victory and lead a 10–1 rout. Home runs by Richard Hidalgo, Jeff Bagwell and Jeff Kent bolstered Houston's scoring output. Clemens also struck out nine, including slugger Barry Bonds twice. At the plate, Clemens singled in his first at bat as a National Leaguer.

When he hit his sixth career grand slam against the Milwaukee Brewers on April 9, first baseman Jeff Bagwell tied a club record. The Colt .45s/Astros franchise record was established by Bob Aspromonte, who hit six from the 1963 to the 1966 seasons. (Note: Six grand slams remained the club record until surpassed by Carlos Lee on July 25, 2011.) Bagwell collated five RBI while Hidalgo added four. Each of Berkman, Bagwell, and Hidalgo doubled. Wade Miller picked up his first victory of the season following six innings with two runs allowed, leading n 13–7 victory over the Milwaukee Brewers.

Richard Hidalgo opened the season with four successive multi-hit bouts, and five of the first six. On April 9, Hidalgo produced his 11th career four-RBI bout. Through the first six contests, Hidalgo batted .500 / .538 on-base percentage (OBP) / .833 slugging percentage (SLG) / 1.372 on-base plus slugging (OPS), two doubles, two home runs, and nine RBI. Thus, Hidalgo received National League Player of the Week honors for the week ended April 11.

==== Brandon Backe's immaculate inning ====
On April 15, Brandon Backe hurled the sixth immaculate inning club history, whiffing Bill Hall, Scott Podsednik, and Craig Counsell of the Milwaukee Brewers during the eighth inning. Backe had come in relief of Mike Gallo for the seventh inning though the Astros trailed, 6–2. Backe tossed a perfect seventh, getting a strikeout of Chad Moeller to end the seventh and start four successive strikeouts. Backe was preceded among Astros pitcher by Shane Reynolds on July 15, 1999, and succeeded by Will Harris on September 27, 2019.

==== Rest of April ====
On April 29, Andy Pettitte obtained his first win in an Astros uniform, also the 150th of his career. Pettitte tossed six shutout innings at PNC Park, surrendered one hit, one walks, and struck out three. Catcher Brad Ausmus and pinch hitter José Vizcaíno each delivered RBI singles as Houston won over the Pittsburgh Pirates, 2–0.

On the strength of a 5–0 win–loss record (W–L), 1.95 earned run average (ERA), 32 strikeouts and 14 bases on balls in 32 1/3 innings pitched, Clemens was named NL Pitcher of the Month for April. In just one start did Clemens allow more than one run. Clemens succeeded Roy Oswalt in August 2002 the most recent Houston moundsman to have been so recognized.

==== May ====
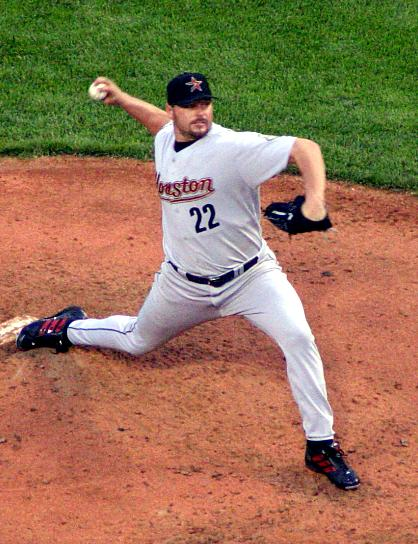
Roger Clemens with the Astros in 2004.

Clemens passed Steve Carlton to move into then-second place behind Nolan Ryan on the all-time strikeout list on May 6 against the Pittsburgh Pirates in a 6–2 victory while striking out nine and bringing his career total to 4,140. In the fifth inning, Clemens whiffed Raúl Mondesí swinging for the milestone; however, he would be displaced back into ranking third just a few years later by Randy Johnson.

Starting things off May 8, Biggio stroked a leadoff single for the 2,500th hit of his career to become the first player in franchise history to reach the mark, all with the Astros. Biggio added two solo home runs to round out a 3-for-4 day. However, the Astros' bullpen was unable to clutch the lead, as the Atlanta Braves rallied for a 5–4 win in 10 innings.

From May 14 to June 11, second baseman Jeff Kent recorded a 25-game hitting streak to eclipse Tony Eusebio's streak of 24 for longest in franchise history, which he accomplished in 2000. Kent raised his batting average from .284 to .315 while stroking 17 extra-base hits to also raise his on-base plus slugging percentage (OPS) from .837 to .902. His achievement stood as the franchise leader until 2006, when Willy Taveras hit in 30 straight. Kent's streak led the National League in 2004, and was second-longest in the Major Leagues to Carlos Lee of the Chicago White Sox (28 games). (Note: Longest streak of consecutive games, in 2004, in the regular season, requiring hits ≥ 1, sorted by most games matching criteria.)

In May, outfielder Lance Berkman produced a .785 slugging percentage with 24 runs batted in (RBI), winning his first career National League Player of the Month honors. Berkman became the first Astro win the Player of the Month Award since Jeff Bagwell in July 2001.

==== June ====
The Milwaukee Brewers recorded an immaculate inning versus the Astros on June 13. However, in the Brewers' next at bat, reliever Brad Lidge recorded four strikeouts. Lidge became the third Astros pitcher to get four strikeouts in one inning, succeeding bullpen mate Octavio Dotel by one year and two days on June 11, 2003, as both the most recent Major Leaguer and most recent Astro (Note: Bud Norris produced the next four-strikeout inning by an Astros pitcher on April 24, 2012.)—the same contest in which the duo partook in the six-man no-hitter at Yankee Stadium. Lidge also struck out six batters over two innings, tying his career high. Moreover, following Brandon Backe's immaculate inning just two months earlier on April 15, the Astros and Brewers became the first Major League teams to trade successive immaculate innings against each other.

In a three-team deal on June 28 involving the Kansas City Royals and Oakland Athletics, the Astros acquired center fielder Carlos Beltrán. The Royals sent Beltrán to Houston for minor league catcher John Buck and cash. The A's sent minor leaguers pitcher Mike Wood and first baseman Mark Teahen to the Royals. The Astros sent relief pitcher Octavio Dotel to the A's. Dotel, the Astros' closer, had a 0–4 W–L with a 3.12 ERA in 34 1/3 innings pitched, 50 strikeouts and 14 saves in 17 opportunities. He had replaced Billy Wagner in that role following his trade to Philadelphia in the previous off-season.

On June 25, Beltrán made his debut as an Astro, going 2-for-4 with a double in a 2–1 defeat to the Texas Rangers.

Beltrán concluded a 15-game hitting streak that spanned June 15 to July 1, overlapping his time with Kansas City and Houston. Beltrán scored 17 runs, hit 7 home runs, drove in 14, and drew 10 base on balls. He hit .377 with a .787 slugging percentage.

On June 30, righty Wade Miller was shut down for the rest of the season due to a shoulder injury. Miller elected to rest the joint rather than undergo surgery,

==== July, pre-All-Star break ====
Carlos Beltrán homered from both sides of the plate on July 1 to become the sixth switch hitter in club history to accomplish this feat, (Note: Preceded by Ken Caminiti on August 20, 1999, as the most recent Astro, and succeeded by Lance Berkman on April 13, 2006.) while producing his first multi-home run game as a member of the Astros. The tenth multi-home run game of Beltrán's career, this was the third of which featured switch-hit home runs.

Having taken 213 turns at the plate without a home run, on July 2, Morgan Ensberg swatted his first of the season after launching 25 blasts the during the prior season. A timely hit, the bomb landed over the railway track past left field at Minute Maid Park in the bottom of the eighth inning. It deposited the Astros in front of the Texas Rangers for the comeback victory, 7–5. Roy Oswalt (7–6) outlasted the Rangers' high-octane offense in spite of surrendering all five runs, but induced 11 punchouts over eight innings. Brad Lidge hurled a spotless ninth with two more whiffs to ice the contest for the save (5).

On July 3, Enberg belted a grand slam during bottom of the fifth to cut the Rangers' lead to 6–5, also Houston's first against their Lone Star Series rivals. Three batters later, Mike Lamb followed with a pinch-hit, two run single to complete the comeback. Houston answered with 7 in the frame to answer Texas' six-run barrage in the top of the fifth. The teams swapped two runs each, but Houston held on for the 10–8 win.

For the third time in team history, on July 4, Astros pitching ceded two grand slams during the same game, for the first time since June 3, 1987. It was the first time against Texas and first in interleague play.

The Astros fired manager Jimy Williams and replaced him with Phil Garner at the All-Star break. With a 44–44 record, the team had been slumping after spending the first month and a half of the season in first place in the National League Central division. That was considered a disappointment due to hopes of reaching the World Series after signing free agent starting pitchers Clemens and Pettitte, and acquiring Beltrán weeks earlier.

==== Major League Baseball All-Star Game at Minute Maid Park ====
The 2004 Major League Baseball All-Star Game was the 75th playing of the midseason exhibition baseball game between the all-stars of the American League (AL) and National League (NL). The game was held on July 13, 2004, for the first time at Minute Maid Park in Houston, Texas, the Houston Astros' home stadium. The third All-Star Game to be hosted in Houston, each occurred over 18-year intervals, first in 1968, and again in 1986, both in the Astrodome.

In the Home Run Derby, Miguel Tejada of the Baltimore Orioles defeated Lance Berkman in the final round, 5–4, to win the contest. Tejada established records of both 27 home runs overall, and 15 in a single round, while Berkman hit the longest home run of the competition at 497 feet (151 m). A switch hitter, Berkman batted from the right side. It was his second career Derby, having first participated in 2002. He hit 21 home runs overall, seven ahead of the third-place finisher, Rafael Palmeiro. No Astro had previously won the tournament; in fact, Berkman became the first to qualify for the final round.

For the first time in franchise history, three Astros manned the starting lineup; Roger Clemens, the MVP of the 1986 Classic, was the starting pitcher, Jeff Kent started at second base, while Berkman started in center field. Clemens was the Astros' first starting pitcher in the Midsummer Classic since Mike Scott in 1987, Kent was the first to start at second base since Craig Biggio in 1998, while Berkman joined César Cedeño in 1973 at center field. Seven years earlier, Bagwell and Biggio comprised the Astros core as two starters for the National League for the first time.

Beltrán, first named to the American League team before the trade, was added to the National League team as a reserve. The game had an attendance of 41,886 and boxing legend Muhammad Ali threw the ceremonial first pitch of the game. The final result was the American League defeating the National League 9–4, thus awarding an AL team (which would eventually be the Boston Red Sox) home-field advantage in the World Series.

==== August ====
A triple play and a seven-run seventh inning on August 19 against Philadelphia highlighted an Astros 12–10 win. With the Phillies leading 7–2, Todd Pratt grounded into a bases-loaded triple play in the fifth inning, Houston's first in 13 years. Berkman, Craig Biggio, and Eric Bruntlett each homered in the seventh inning.

From August 23 to 27, Carlos Beltrán became one of six major league players that season to hit a home in five consecutive games or more, trailing only 7 consecutive by Barry Bonds. Beltrán hit .421/.500/1.368, 6 home runs and 10 RBI. Starting August 29, Lance Berkman homered in four consecutive games, going .444/.524/1.333, five home runs, 9 RBI (second on the team). (Note: Longest streak of consecutive games, in 2004, in the regular season, requiring home runs ≥ 1, sorted by most games matching criteria.) Beltrán joined Richard Hidalgo as the second Astro to earn Player of the Week honors for this season. The week from August 23 to 29 for Beltrán resulted in hitting .435/.594/1.261/1.855, eight walks, 10 runs, and just 2 strikeouts. Home runs in five consecutive games by Beltrán tied a team record first attained by Cliff Johnson from August 19 to 24, 1975. (Note: Surpassed by Morgan Ensberg on April 15 to 21, 2006. Criteria: Longest streak of consecutive games, Playing for HOU, in the regular season, requiring home runs ≥ 1, sorted by most games matching criteria.)

On August 24, southpaw Andy Pettitte underwent successful surgery to repair his left elbow and would miss the rest of the season. He was expected to be ready for Opening Day of 2005. The surgery closed a campaign in which he faced higher-than-normal struggles and ineffective results.

Following a defeat to the Chicago Cubs on August 26, the Astros embarked on a club record with a 12-game winning streak.

Jeff Bagwell recorded his 200th career stolen base on August 30 against the Cincinnati Reds to become the tenth player in MLB history to reach that plateau while hitting 400 home runs. Also on August 30, Craig Biggio commenced a 14-game hitting streak, second-longest for the Astros on the season to Jeff Kent's from May 14 to June 11. Biggio hit .338 with three home runs and 8 RBI.

==== September—October ====
On September 3, Jeff Kent connected for his 11th career grand slam, and second as a member of the Astros. The 11 grand slams tied Kent for 11th all-time MLB history.

Willy Taveras made his Major League debut on September 6, while Astros' starting pitcher Brandon Backe slammed his first major league home as a batter. Taveras substituted in center field for Carlos Beltrán in the top of the eighth inning in an 11–5 victory over the Cincinnati Reds. Leading off the bottom of eighth for his first major league plate appearance, Taveras struck out swinging versus John Riedling. Earlier, in the bottom of the fourth, Jeff Bagwell (23), Lance Berkman (26), Jeff Kent (21), and Backe all homered off Reds starter Aaron Harang (8–8). Backe, who reached base in each of his three plate appearances, also thumped a single and drew a walk. Mike Lamb added two hits and three RBI for Houston. On the mound, Backe (3–2) tossed seven innings to garner the victory as he surrendered one run, scattered seven hits and one walk, and struck out eight.

On September 18, Bagwell collected his 1,500th career RBI with a single in the third inning against the Brewers. Two innings later, he homered for his 1,500th run scored, becoming just 29th player in MLB history and first Astro to reach both milestones.

On September 26, Lance Berkman connected for his 30th home to become the first Astros outfielder with three such campaigns.

Astros fans made history on September 28, mounting the season's attendance total to three million. This was the just the second time in club history the club saw this milestone reached (2000), the inaugural season of Minute Maid Park as Enron Field. Counting that year's playoffs, the attendance figure totaled greater than 3.2 million for 2004.

On September 29, Jeff Kent crushed his 300th career home run, connecting off Jeff Suppan in the second inning to a break a scoreless tie with the St. Louis Cardinals.

On October 2, Jeff Kent hit the 278th home run of his career as the second baseman, which surpassed Ryne Sandberg for most all-time at the position. (Note: In Cumulative seasons, In the regular season, from 1901 to 2025, as 2B (within defensive positions), sorted by greatest home runs.)

On October 3, Brad Lidge struck out all four batters faced, earning his 29th save during his fifth outing of the season with four or more strikeouts. Entering in the top of the eighth, Lidge struck out Garrett Atkins for his 153rd strikeout, and in the top of the ninth, fanned leadoff hitter Todd Greene for his 154th, a record-breaking strikeout for National League relief pitchers, passing Dick Selma in 1970 for the Philadelphia Phillies, and ending the season with 157 strikeouts. (Note: For single seasons, playing in the NL, at least 80% games in relief, in the regular season, requiring strikeouts ≥ 135, sorted by descending strikeouts.) Brandon Backe (5–3) earned the victory while delivering a two-run single (6). Mike Gallo (4), Chad Qualls (9), Russ Springer (5), and Dan Miceli (24) all earned holds.

==== Performance overview ====
The Astros won 36 of their final 46 games to capture the National League Wild Card. The NL Central division champion St. Louis Cardinals steamrolled their way to a major league-best 105–57 record, leaving Houston 13 games behind. Meanwhile, the Astros finished just a game ahead of the San Francisco Giants to take their first playoff berth since 2001.

The Astros realized the 89-win threshold for the seventh time in franchise history, while qualifying for their eighth playoff appearance, via their first-ever Wild Card title. Since the inception of the NL Central division in 1994, Houston had concluded the regular season in either first or second place ten times in 11 seasons, excluding the 2000 campaign. Furthermore, during a span of 17 seasons commencing in 1992, the 2004 campaign signified the twelfth of 13 having completed with a .500 winning percentage or above. The 2004 stage was also the fourth of five in succession with 84 or more wins—another club record—which remained so until 2015 to 2025, excluding the shortened 2020 season. For the fifth time in seven seasons, The Astros scored 800 or more runs (803), the most prolific span in club history, as well as scoring 740 or more for the tenth successive campaign. Their final regular-season home attendance was 3,087,872, also a club record, surpassing their 2000 total of 3,056,139, as well as they second time the franchise had totaled 3 million or more.

After the Astros acquired Carlos Beltrán from the Royals, he played 90 games batting .258 with 23 home runs, 53 RBI, and 28 stolen bases. His combined totals in 2004 included 159 games with a .267 batting average, 38 home runs, 104 RBI, 42 stolen bases, and 121 runs scored. Thus, he entered the 30 home runs—30 stolen bases club, (Note: 30–30 club) joining Bagwell (twice, 1997 and 1999) as the second Astro to accomplish this feat.

Jeff Bagwell finished with 27 home runs, extending a club-record streak of 12 seasons with at least 20 home runs.

Lance Berkman, who drew 127 bases on balls, established the National League record for a single season by a switch hitter. Berkman also became the first Astros outfielder to produce 30 or more home runs in three different campaigns, following his 2001 (34) and 2002 (42) campaigns. The outfielders he surpassed were Jimmy Wynn (1967, 1969) and Moisés Alou (1998, 2000). (Note: Number of seasons player meets criteria, up to 2004, played at least 50% of games at any OF, playing for HOU, in the regular season, requiring home runs ≥ 30, sorted by descending instances.)

Roger Clemens won the NL Cy Young Award to join Mike Scott in 1986 as the second Astro to win this award. The seventh such award for Clemens, he extended his major league record for this award, and became just the fourth hurler to win the award in both leagues. Meanwhile, Oswalt became the fourth Astros pitcher to lead the league in wins (20), following Joe Niekro in (21 in 1979), Scott (20 in 1989), and Mike Hampton (22 in 1999). Clemens and Oswalt became the 16th teammate dup since 1900 to each register 18 or more wins, a sub-3.50 ERA, and 200 or more strikeouts, having succeeded Randy Johnson and Curt Schilling of the 2002 Arizona Diamondbacks as the most recent tandem to have accomplished the feat. (Note: Number of players that meet criteria in a season for a team, since 1900, in the regular season, requiring wins ≥ 18, earned run average ≤ 3.5 and strikeouts ≥ 200, sorted by descending instances.)

=== League standings ===
==== National League Central ====
NL Central
Team	W	L	Pct.	GB	Home	Road
St. Louis Cardinals	105	57	.648	—	53‍–‍28	52‍–‍29
Houston Astros	92	70	.568	13	48‍–‍33	44‍–‍37
Chicago Cubs	89	73	.549	16	45‍–‍37	44‍–‍36
Cincinnati Reds	76	86	.469	29	40‍–‍41	36‍–‍45
Pittsburgh Pirates	72	89	.447	32½	39‍–‍41	33‍–‍48
Milwaukee Brewers	67	94	.416	37½	36‍–‍45	31‍–‍49

==== Record versus opponents ====
NL Records

2004 National League record Source: MLB Standings Grid – 2004
Team	AZ	ATL	CHC	CIN	COL	FLA	HOU	LAD	MIL	MON	NYM	PHI	PIT	SD	SF	STL	AL
Arizona	—	2–4	4–2	3–3	6–13	3–4	2–4	3–16	3–3	0–6	3–4	1–5	2–4	7–12	5–14	1–5	6–12
Atlanta	4–2	—	3–3	2–4	4–2	14–5	3–3	4–3	4–2	15–4	12–7	10–9	4–2	3–3	4–3	2–4	8–10
Chicago	2–4	3–3	—	9–8	5–1	3–3	10–9	2–4	10–7	3–3	4–2	3–3	13–5	4–2	2–4	8–11	8–4
Cincinnati	3–3	4–2	8–9	—	3–3	4–2	6–11	4–2	10–8	4–2	3–3	3–3	9–10	2–4	3–3	5–14	5-7
Colorado	13–6	2–4	1–5	3–3	—	1–5	1–5	8–11	2–4	2–4	1–5	5–3	2–4	10–9	8–11	1–5	8–10
Florida	4–3	5–14	3–3	2–4	5–1	—	3–3	3–3	4–2	11–8	15–4	12–7	1–5	4–2	2–5	2–4	7–11
Houston	4–2	3–3	9–10	11–6	5–1	3-3	—	1–5	13–6	2–4	2–4	6–0	12–5	2–4	2–4	10–8	7–5
Los Angeles	16–3	3–4	4–2	2–4	11–8	3–3	5–1	—	3–3	4–3	3–3	1–5	6–0	10–9	10–9	2–4	10–8
Milwaukee	3–3	2–4	7–10	8–10	4–2	2–4	6–13	3–3	—	5–1	2–4	0–6	6–12	2–4	1–5	8–9	8–4
Montreal	6–0	4–15	3–3	2–4	4–2	8-11	4–2	3–4	1–5	—	9–10	7–12	4–2	1–6	1–5	3–3	7–11
New York	4–3	7–12	2–4	3–3	5–1	4–15	4–2	3–3	4–2	10–9	—	8–11	1–5	1–6	4–2	1–5	10–8
Philadelphia	5-1	9–10	3–3	3–3	3–5	7–12	0–6	5–1	6–0	12–7	11–8	—	3–3	5–1	2–4	3–3	9–9
Pittsburgh	4–2	2–4	5–13	10–9	4–2	5–1	5–12	0–6	12–6	2–4	5–1	3–3	—	3–3	5–1	5–12	2–10
San Diego	12–7	3–3	2–4	4–2	9–10	2–4	4–2	9–10	4–2	6–1	6–1	1–5	3–3	—	12–7	2–4	8–10
San Francisco	14–5	3–4	4–2	3–3	11–8	5–2	4–2	9–10	5–1	5–1	2–4	4–2	1–5	7–12	—	3–3	11–7
St. Louis	5–1	4–2	11–8	14–5	5–1	4-2	8–10	4–2	9–8	3–3	5–1	3–3	12–5	4–2	3–3	—	11–1

=== Transactions ===
- April 17, 2004: Kirk Saarloos was traded by the Houston Astros to the Oakland Athletics for Chad Harville.
- June 7, 2004: Hunter Pence was drafted by the Houston Astros in the 2nd round of the 2004 amateur draft. Player signed July 14, 2004.
- June 7, 2004: J.R. Towles was drafted by the Houston Astros in the 20th round of the 2004 amateur draft. Player signed June 16, 2004.
- June 17, 2004: Dave Weathers was traded by the New York Mets with Jeremy Griffiths to the Houston Astros for Richard Hidalgo.
- June 28, 2004: Carlos Beltrán was traded from the Kansas City Royals to the Houston Astros in a three-team deal, which also sent relief pitcher Octavio Dotel from the Astros to the Oakland Athletics, while the Royals picked up Oakland minor leaguers (pitcher Mike Wood and third-baseman Mark Teahen) and Astros catcher John Buck.
- September 7, 2004: Dave Weathers was released by the Houston Astros.

=== Roster ===
2004 Houston Astros
Roster
Pitchers: 37,41 Brandon Backe; 56 Kirk Bullinger; 22 Roger Clemens; 29 Octavio Dotel; 31 Brandon Duckworth; 41 Jared Fernández; 45 Mike Gallo; 47 Jeremy Griffiths; 43 Chad Harville; 27 Carlos Hernández; 54 Brad Lidge; 58 Dan Miceli; 52 Wade Miller; 53 Peter Munro; 37 Darren Oliver; 44 Roy Oswalt; 21 Andy Pettitte; 50 Chad Qualls; 51 Tim Redding; 36 Russ Springer; 20 Ricky Stone; 35 David Weathers; 35 Dan Wheeler	Catchers: 11 Brad Ausmus; 46 Raúl Chávez; 59 Chris Tremie; Infielders: 29 Jason Alfaro; 5 Jeff Bagwell; 4 Eric Bruntlett; 2 Chris Burke; 14 Morgan Ensberg; 28 Adam Everett; 12 Jeff Kent; 26 Mike Lamb; 10 José Vizcaíno	Outfielders: 15 Carlos Beltrán; 17 Lance Berkman; 7 Craig Biggio; 15 Richard Hidalgo; 24 Jason Lane; 19 Orlando Palmeiro; 1 Willy Taveras	Manager: 3 Phil Garner; 3 Jimy Williams; Coaches: 6 Mark Bailey (bullpen); 25 José Cruz (first base); 8 Gary Gaetti (hitting); 48 Jim Hickey (pitching); 48 Burt Hooton (pitching); 38 Gene Lamont (third base); 8 Harry Spilman (hitting); 30 John Tamargo (bench)

== Player statistics ==
Table legend
League leader
League top ten
Team leader

=== Batting ===
==== Starters by position ====
Note: Pos = Position; G = Games played; AB = At bats; H = Hits; Avg. = Batting average; HR = Home runs; RBI = Runs batted in

Regular season results
Pos.	Player	G	AB	H	Avg.	HR	RBI
C	Brad Ausmus	129	403	100	.248	5	31
1B	Jeff Bagwell	156	572	152	.266	27	89
2B	Jeff Kent	145	540	156	.289	27	107
SS	Adam Everett	104	384	105	.273	8	31
3B	Morgan Ensberg	131	411	113	.275	10	66
LF	Craig Biggio	156	633	178	.281	24	63
CF	Carlos Beltrán	90	333	86	.258	23	53
RF	Lance Berkman	160	544	172	.316	30	106

==== Other batters ====
Note: G = Games played; AB = At Bats; H = Hits; Avg. = Batting average; HR = Home runs; RBI = Runs batted in

Regular season results
Player	G	AB	H	Avg.	HR	RBI
José Vizcaíno	138	358	98	.274	3	33
Mike Lamb	112	278	80	.288	14	58
Richard Hidalgo	58	199	51	.256	4	30
Raúl Chávez	64	162	34	.210	0	23
Jason Lane	107	136	37	.272	4	19
Orlando Palmeiro	102	133	32	.241	3	12
Eric Bruntlett	45	52	13	.250	4	8
Chris Burke	17	17	1	.059	0	0
Jason Alfaro	7	11	2	.182	0	0
Willy Taveras	10	1	0	.000	0	0
Chris Tremie	1	0	0	----	0	0

=== Pitching ===
==== Starting pitchers ====
Note: G = Games pitched; IP = Innings pitched; W = Wins; L = Losses; ERA = Earned run average; SO = Strikeouts

Regular season results
Player	G	IP	W	L	ERA	SO
Roy Oswalt	36	237.0	20	10	3.49	206
Roger Clemens	33	214.1	18	4	2.98	218
Pete Munro	21	99.2	4	7	5.15	63
Wade Miller	15	88.2	7	7	3.35	74
Andy Pettitte	15	83.0	6	4	3.90	79
Carlos Hernández	9	42.0	1	3	6.43	26
Jeremy Griffiths	1	4.1	0	0	10.38	5

==== Other pitchers ====
Note: G = Games pitched; IP = Innings pitched; W = Wins; L = Losses; ERA = Earned run average; SO = Strikeouts

Regular season results
Player	G	IP	W	L	ERA	SO
Tim Redding	27	100.2	5	7	5.72	56
Brandon Backe	33	67.0	5	3	4.30	54
Brandon Duckworth	19	39.1	1	2	6.86	23
Darren Oliver	9	14.0	1	0	3.86	13
Jared Fernández	2	1.0	0	0	54.00	0

==== Relief pitchers ====
Note: G = Games pitched; IP = Innings pitched; W = Wins; L = Losses; SV = Saves; SO = Strikeouts

Regular season results
Player	G	IP	W	L	SV	SO
Brad Lidge	80	6	5	29	1.90	157
Dan Miceli	74	6	6	2	3.59	83
Mike Gallo	69	2	0	0	4.74	34
Chad Harville	56	3	2	0	4.75	46
Octavio Dotel	32	0	4	14	3.12	50
Kirk Bullinger	27	1	0	1	6.16	11
David Weathers	26	1	4	0	4.78	26
Chad Qualls	25	4	0	1	3.55	24
Ricky Stone	16	1	1	0	5.68	16
Russ Springer	16	0	1	0	2.63	9
Dan Wheeler	14	0	0	0	2.51	9

== Playoffs ==
=== National League Division Series ===
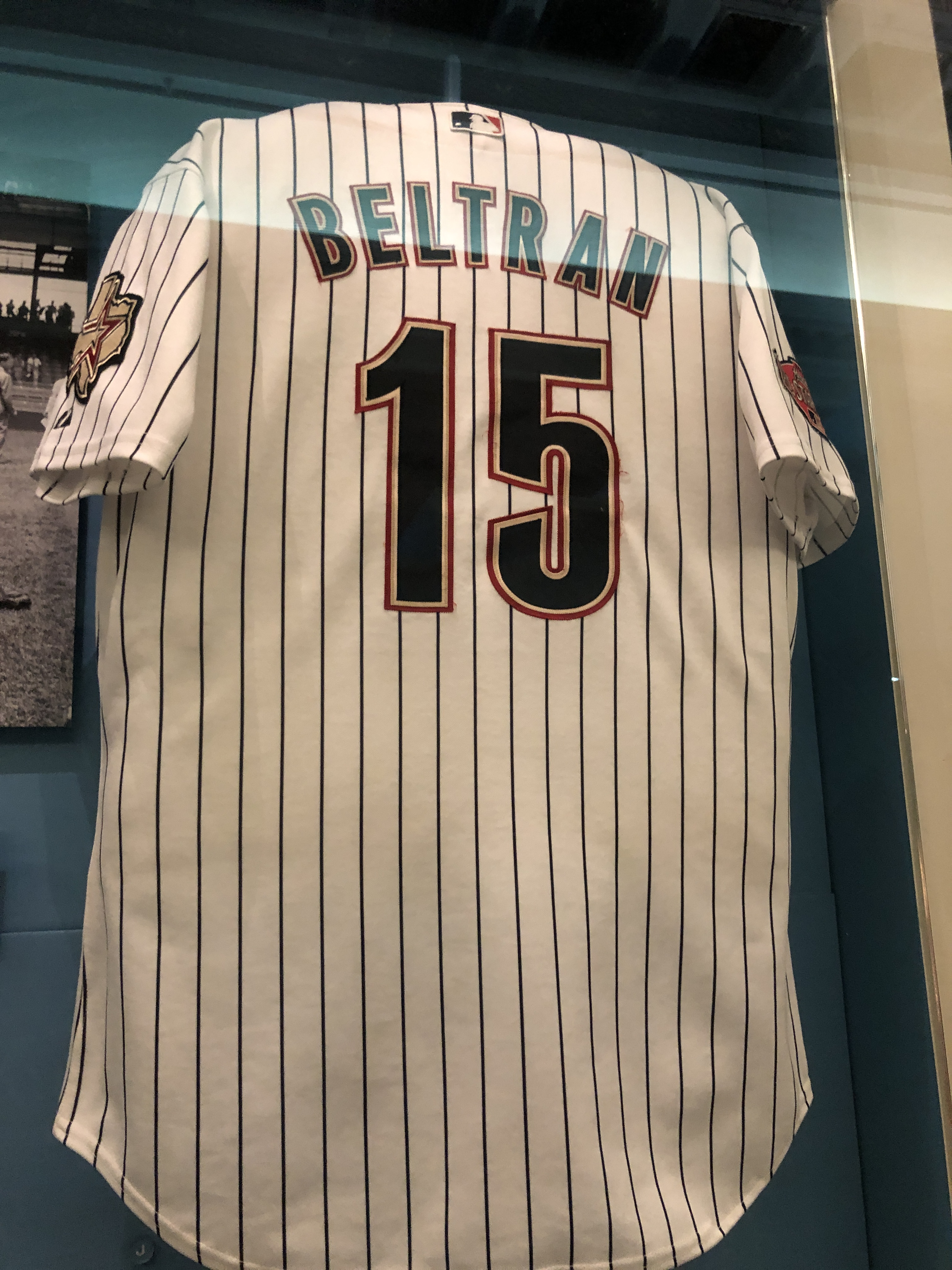
Carlos Beltran's jersey at the Library of Congress Baseball Americana exhibit

In Game 2, Bagwell hit his first career postseason home run off Mike Hampton in the first inning in a 4–2 extra-inning loss.

After seven failed attempts in 43 years of franchise history to win a playoff series, the Astros defeated the Atlanta Braves in five games for their first. Behind the quartet dubbed the "Killer B's" – composed of Bagwell, Beltrán, Berkman and Biggio – who batted .395 (34-for-86) with eight home runs, 21 RBI and 24 runs scored, the Astros' offense ignited, scoring an NLDS-record 36 runs. Beltrán homered four times in this series.

Game	Score	Date
1	Houston 9, Atlanta 3	October 6
2	Atlanta 4, Houston 2 (11 innings)	October 7
3	Houston 8, Atlanta 5	October 9
4	Atlanta 6, Houston 5	October 10
5	Houston 12, Atlanta 3	October 11

=== National League Championship Series ===
The Astros faced the St. Louis Cardinals in the playoffs for the first time in 2004 in the National League Championship Series (NLCS). By hitting one home run in each of the first four home runs in the NLCS, including the game-winner in Game 4, Beltrán tied Barry Bonds' record for home runs in single postseason-record with eight, continuing a strong performance from the NLDS. Counting a two home-run performance in Game 5 of the NLDS, that gave Beltrán at least one home run in a record-setting five consecutive postseason games, later eclipsed by Daniel Murphy's home runs in six consecutive postseason games in 2015.

The home run record that Beltrán tied with Bonds was matched in 2011 by Nelson Cruz of the Texas Rangers, and surpassed in 2020 by Randy Arozarena of the Tampa Bay Rays.

Cardinals center fielder Jim Edmonds hit the game-winning home run off Dan Miceli in the 12th inning of Game 6, for a 6–4 final score and forcing a Game 7. It was the third game Miceli lost of the 2004 postseason.

Game	Score	Date
1	St. Louis 10, Houston 7	October 13, 2004
2	St. Louis 6, Houston 4	October 14, 2004
3	Houston 5, St. Louis 2	October 16, 2004
4	Houston 6, St. Louis 5	October 17, 2004
5	Houston 3, St. Louis 0	October 18, 2004
6	St. Louis 6, Houston 4	October 20, 2004
7	St. Louis 5, Houston 2	October 21, 2004

== Awards and achievements ==
=== Offensive achievements ===
==== Grand slams ====
No.	Date	Astros batter	Venue	Inning	Pitcher	Opposing team	Box
1	April 9	Jeff Bagwell	Miller Park	6	Brooks Kieschnick	Milwaukee Brewers	
2	April 11	Lance Berkman	Miller Park	3 (Note: Tied score or took lead)	Doug Davis	Milwaukee Brewers	
3	July 3	Morgan Ensberg	Minute Maid Park	5	Ricardo Rodríguez	Texas Rangers	
4	September 1	Jeff Kent	Great American Ball Park	7	Ryan Wagner	Cincinnati Reds	

==== Power—speed club ====
30 home runs–30 stolen bases club
Player	AVG	Runs	HR	SB	PSN
Carlos Beltrán (Note: Includes full-season totals with both the Kansas City Royals and Houston Astros.)	.267	121	42	38	39.9

=== Records ===
- Roger Clemens, Major league record seventh Cy Young Award won
- Brad Lidge, National League Record, Most Strikeouts in One Season by a Relief Pitcher (157)
- Carlos Beltrán:
  - Postseason: Most home runs in consecutive games (5, since broken by Daniel Murphy)
  - Single post-season: Most home runs (8–tied with Barry Bonds)
- Houston Astros, NLDS-record for runs scored (36)

=== Awards ===
2004 Houston Astros award winners
Name of award		Recipient	Ref
Cy Young Award		Roger Clemens	
Darryl Kile Good Guy Award		Roy Oswalt	
Fred Hartman Award for Long and Meritorious Service to Baseball		Gerry Hunsicker	
Houston-Area Major League Player of the Year	TBR	Carl Crawford	
Houston Astros	Most Valuable Player (MVP)	Lance Berkman	
Houston Astros	Pitcher of the Year	Roger Clemens	
Houston Astros	Rookie of the Year	Chad Qualls	
MLB All-Star Game	Reserve outfielder	Carlos Beltrán	
MLB All-Star Game	Starting center fielder	Lance Berkman	
MLB All-Star Game	Home Run Derby contestant	Lance Berkman	
MLB All-Star Game	Starting pitcher	Roger Clemens	
MLB All-Star Game	Starting second baseman	Jeff Kent	
National League (NL) Pitcher of the Month	April	Roger Clemens	
National League (NL) Player of the Month	June	Lance Berkman	
National League (NL) Player of the Week	April 11	Richard Hidalgo	
National League (NL) Player of the Week	August 29	Carlos Beltrán	

Other awards results

Name of award	Voting recipient(s) (Team)	Ref.
NL Cy Young	1st—Clemens (HOU) • 3rd—Oswalt (HOU) • 8th—Lidge (HOU)	
NL Manager of the Year	1st—Cox (ATL) • 4th—Garner (HOU)	
NL Most Valuable Player	1st—Bonds (SFG) • 7th—Berkman (HOU) • 8th—Clemens (HOU); Other Astros: 12th—Beltrán • 13th—Kent • 23rd—Oswalt	
This Year in Baseball Best Closer	1st—Rivera (NYY) • 3rd—Lidge (HOU)	

=== League leaders ===
Individual pitching leaders

- Games started: Roy Oswalt (35)
- Winning percentage: Roger Clemens (.818)
- Wins: Roy Oswalt (20)

== Minor league system ==
Level	Team	League	Manager
AAA	New Orleans Zephyrs	Pacific Coast League	Chris Maloney
AA	Round Rock Express	Texas League	Jackie Moore
A	Salem Avalanche	Carolina League	Russ Nixon
A	Lexington Legends	South Atlantic League	Iván DeJesús
A-Short Season	Tri-City ValleyCats	New York–Penn League	Gregg Langbehn
Rookie	Greeneville Astros	Appalachian League	Jorge Orta and Tim Bogar

Championships

- Appalachian League champions: Greeneville

Awards

- All-Star Futures Game—Second baseman: Chris Burke
- Appalachian League Executive of the Year: Lynsi House
- Appalachian League Manager of the Year: Tim Bogar
- Appalachian League Player of the Year: MItch Einertson
- Houston Astros Minor League Player of the Year: Chris Burke
- Pacific Coast League Top MLB Prospect: Chris Burke
- Triple-A All-Star Team—Second baseman: Chris Burke

== See also ==
- 30–30 club
- List of Major League Baseball All-Star Game starting pitchers
- List of Major League Baseball All-Star Game venues
- List of Major League Baseball annual wins leaders
- List of Major League Baseball franchise postseason streaks
- List of Major League Baseball game sevens
- List of Major League Baseball pitchers who have thrown an immaculate inning
- List of Major League Baseball single-inning strikeout leaders
