= 2004 National League Division Series =

American baseball games

Teams
| Team (Wins) | | Manager | Season |
| St. Louis Cardinals (3) | | Tony La Russa | 105–57 (.648), GA: 13 |
| Los Angeles Dodgers (1) | | Jim Tracy | 93–69 (.574), GA: 2 |
- Dates: October 5–10
- Television: ESPN (Game 1); Fox (Games 2–4)
- TV announcers: Jon Miller, Joe Morgan, and Gary Miller (Game 1); Joe Buck, Tim McCarver, and Chris Myers (Game 2); Thom Brennaman, Tim McCarver (Games 3–4), Kevin Kennedy (Game 3), and Chris Myers (Game 4)
- Radio: ESPN
- Radio announcers: Gary Cohen and Luis Gonzalez
- Umpires: Dale Scott, Greg Gibson, Chuck Meriwether, Bruce Dreckman, Gerry Davis, Brian O'Nora

Teams
| Team (Wins) | | Manager | Season |
| Houston Astros (3) | | Phil Garner | 92–70 (.568), GB: 13 |
| Atlanta Braves (2) | | Bobby Cox | 96–66 (.593), GA: 10 |
- Dates: October 6–11
- Television: ESPN (Games 1–2, 4); ESPN2 (Game 3); Fox (Game 5)
- TV announcers: Dave O'Brien, Jeff Brantley, and David Justice (Games 1–3); Jon Miller and Joe Morgan (Game 4); Josh Lewin, Steve Lyons, and Pam Oliver (Game 5)
- Radio: ESPN
- Radio announcers: Jim Durham and Rich Aurilia
- Umpires: Tim McClelland, Phil Cuzzi, Wally Bell, Fieldin Culbreth, Joe Brinkman, Tony Randazzo

The 2004 National League Division Series (NLDS) consisted of two best-of-five playoff series on the National League side in Major League Baseball’s (MLB) 2004 postseason, began on Tuesday, October 5, and ended on Monday, October 11, with the champions of the three NL divisions—along with a "wild card" team—participating in two series.

Under MLB's playoff format, no two teams from the same division were matched up in the Division Series, regardless of whether their records would normally indicate such a matchup. Home field advantage went to the team with the better regular-season record with the exception of the wild card team, which defers home field advantage regardless of record. The matchups were:

- (1) St. Louis Cardinals (NL Central champions) vs. (3) Los Angeles Dodgers (NL West champions): Cardinals won the series, 3–1.
- (2) Atlanta Braves (NL East champions) vs. (4) Houston Astros (Wild Card qualifier): Astros won the series, 3–2.

The higher seeded team in each series hosts Games 1, 2, and 5 (if necessary), and the lower seeded team hosts Games 3 and 4 (if necessary).

The National League division and wild card races were some of the most exciting in the wild card era, as the National League West came down to the final weekend of the season, while there were as many as four teams trying for a post-season berth via the wild card the last week of the season, which ultimately saw Houston clinch the Wild Card spot on the final day of the regular season.

The St. Louis Cardinals and Houston Astros went on to meet in the NL Championship Series (NLCS). The Cardinals became the National League champion, and lost to the American League champion Boston Red Sox in the 2004 World Series.

== Matchups ==
=== St. Louis Cardinals vs. Los Angeles Dodgers ===
St. Louis won the series, 3–1.

| Game | Date | Score | Location | Time | Attendance |
|---|---|---|---|---|---|
| 1 | October 5 | Los Angeles Dodgers – 3, St. Louis Cardinals – 8 | Busch Stadium (II) | 3:11 | 52,127 |
| 2 | October 7 | Los Angeles Dodgers – 3, St. Louis Cardinals – 8 | Busch Stadium (II) | 3:36 | 52,228 |
| 3 | October 9 | St. Louis Cardinals – 0, Los Angeles Dodgers – 4 | Dodger Stadium | 2:23 | 55,992 |
| 4 | October 10 | St. Louis Cardinals – 6, Los Angeles Dodgers – 2 | Dodger Stadium | 3:21 | 56,268 |

=== Atlanta Braves vs. Houston Astros ===
Houston won the series, 3–2.

| Game | Date | Score | Location | Time | Attendance |
|---|---|---|---|---|---|
| 1 | October 6 | Houston Astros – 9, Atlanta Braves – 3 | Turner Field | 3:08 | 41,464 |
| 2 | October 7 | Houston Astros – 2, Atlanta Braves – 4 (11) | Turner Field | 3:27 | 40,075 |
| 3 | October 9 | Atlanta Braves – 5, Houston Astros – 8 | Minute Maid Park | 3:19 | 43,547 |
| 4 | October 10 | Atlanta Braves – 6, Houston Astros – 5 | Minute Maid Park | 3:24 | 43,336 |
| 5 | October 11 | Houston Astros – 12, Atlanta Braves – 3 | Turner Field | 3:12 | 54,068 |

== St. Louis vs. Los Angeles ==
=== Game 1 ===
October 5, 2004 12:09 pm (CDT) at Busch Stadium (II) in St. Louis, Missouri 57 °F (14 °C), sunny
| Team | 1 | 2 | 3 | 4 | 5 | 6 | 7 | 8 | 9 | R | H | E |
|---|---|---|---|---|---|---|---|---|---|---|---|---|
| Los Angeles | 0 | 0 | 0 | 0 | 1 | 1 | 0 | 0 | 1 | 3 | 9 | 1 |
| St. Louis | 1 | 0 | 5 | 1 | 0 | 0 | 1 | 0 | X | 8 | 9 | 0 |
WP: Woody Williams (1–0) LP: Odalis Pérez (0–1); Home runs: LAD: Tom Wilson (1); STL: Albert Pujols (1), Larry Walker 2 (2), Jim Edmonds (1), Mike Matheny (1); Attendance: 52,127; Boxscore

Odalis Pérez faced Woody Williams in Game 1. Albert Pujols got the Cardinals started with a two-out solo homer to make it 1–0 in the first. Then in the third, Perez reached his limit after surrendering five two-out runs. Larry Walker's solo homer made it 2–0. Pujols singled and Scott Rolen walked before Édgar Rentería doubled in both, then Jim Edmonds's two-run homer made it 6–0 Cardinals. In the fourth, Mike Matheny homered off Elmer Dessens to make it 7–0. The Dodgers got on the board in the fifth on back-to-back two-out doubles by Cesar Izturis and Jayson Werth, then added another run next inning when Adrian Beltre hit a leadoff single and scored on Alex Cora's two-out triple. The Cardinals added to their lead on Larry Walker's leadoff home run in the seventh off Giovanni Carrara. Kiko Calero and Ray King followed Williams' six solid innings with a perfect seventh and eighth. Jason Isringhausen closed out the game after allowing a home run to Tom Wilson in the ninth.

=== Game 2 ===
October 7, 2004 7:19 pm (CDT) at Busch Stadium (II) in St. Louis, Missouri 80 °F (27 °C), cloudy
| Team | 1 | 2 | 3 | 4 | 5 | 6 | 7 | 8 | 9 | R | H | E |
|---|---|---|---|---|---|---|---|---|---|---|---|---|
| Los Angeles | 1 | 0 | 0 | 2 | 0 | 0 | 0 | 0 | 0 | 3 | 6 | 1 |
| St. Louis | 0 | 3 | 0 | 0 | 3 | 0 | 2 | 0 | X | 8 | 11 | 0 |
WP: Dan Haren (1–0) LP: Jeff Weaver (0–1); Home runs: LAD: Jayson Werth (1), Shawn Green (1), Milton Bradley (1); STL: None; Attendance: 52,228; Boxscore

Jeff Weaver faced Jason Marquis in Game 2. Jayson Werth homered in the first to make it 1–0 Dodgers, but in the second, with runners on first and second and one out, Weaver's error on a pickoff attempt allowed Edgar Renteria to score and Reggie Sanders to go to second. One out later, Tony Womack's triple and Larry Walker's double scored a run each, giving the Cardinals a 3–1 lead. However, back-to-back homers by Shawn Green and Milton Bradley to lead off the top of the fourth tied the game. Marquis was removed in favor of Cal Eldred. With Weaver still pitching in the fifth and runners on first and second and two outs, Renteria's RBI single put the Cardinals back in front 4–3. After Sanders was hit by a pitch to load the bases, Mike Matheny's two-run single made it 6–3 Cardinals. Matheny would also come through in the seventh with another two-run single off Giovanni Carrara. The Cardinals' solid bullpen held the Dodgers as they cruised to another 8–3 win.

=== Game 3 ===
October 9, 2004 5:11 pm (PDT) at Dodger Stadium in Los Angeles, California 70 °F (21 °C), sunny
| Team | 1 | 2 | 3 | 4 | 5 | 6 | 7 | 8 | 9 | R | H | E |
|---|---|---|---|---|---|---|---|---|---|---|---|---|
| St. Louis | 0 | 0 | 0 | 0 | 0 | 0 | 0 | 0 | 0 | 0 | 5 | 0 |
| Los Angeles | 0 | 0 | 2 | 1 | 0 | 1 | 0 | 0 | X | 4 | 7 | 0 |
WP: José Lima (1–0) LP: Matt Morris (0–1); Home runs: STL: None; LAD: Shawn Green 2 (3); Attendance: 55,992; Boxscore

With time running out, the Dodgers called on José Lima for Game 3. Opposing him would be Matt Morris. Both pitchers kept the game quiet until the third. The Dodgers would take the lead for only the second time in the series with a two-run bases-loaded double by Steve Finley. Then Shawn Green followed with a leadoff homer in the fourth. Lima would keep the Cardinals silent all night and Green would homer once again in the sixth to make it 4–0. Lima would pitch a complete-game five-hit shutout to give the Dodgers their first postseason win since the clinching Game 5 of the 1988 World Series.

=== Game 4 ===
October 10, 2004 5:10 pm (PDT) at Dodger Stadium in Los Angeles, California 66 °F (19 °C), sunny
| Team | 1 | 2 | 3 | 4 | 5 | 6 | 7 | 8 | 9 | R | H | E |
|---|---|---|---|---|---|---|---|---|---|---|---|---|
| St. Louis | 0 | 1 | 1 | 3 | 0 | 0 | 1 | 0 | 0 | 6 | 8 | 0 |
| Los Angeles | 1 | 0 | 1 | 0 | 0 | 0 | 0 | 0 | 0 | 2 | 3 | 1 |
WP: Jeff Suppan (1–0) LP: Wilson Álvarez (0–1); Home runs: STL: Reggie Sanders (1), Albert Pujols (2); LAD: Jayson Werth (2); Attendance: 56,268; Boxscore

All the momentum the Dodgers might have had disappeared in Game 4. Jeff Suppan faced Odalis Pérez and Jayson Werth struck first against Suppan with a one-out homer in the first to make it 1–0 Dodgers, but Reggie Sanders homered as well to tie the game in the second. Then with two on via two walks, Édgar Rentería gave the Cardinals the lead with an RBI single in the third, but the Dodgers tied the game on a sacrifice fly by Adrián Beltré. However, Wilson Álvarez faced Albert Pujols with two men on in the fourth and surrender a three-run homer to give the Cardinals a commanding 5–2 lead. Then Pujols singled home Larry Walker off Yhency Brazoban to give the Cardinals a 6–2 lead in the seventh. That marked the end for the Dodgers as Alex Cora struck out against Jason Isringhausen to end the series in the ninth.

=== Composite line score ===
2004 NLDS (3–1): St. Louis Cardinals over Los Angeles Dodgers

| Team | 1 | 2 | 3 | 4 | 5 | 6 | 7 | 8 | 9 | R | H | E |
|---|---|---|---|---|---|---|---|---|---|---|---|---|
| St. Louis Cardinals | 1 | 4 | 6 | 4 | 3 | 0 | 4 | 0 | 0 | 22 | 33 | 0 |
| Los Angeles Dodgers | 2 | 0 | 3 | 3 | 1 | 2 | 0 | 0 | 1 | 12 | 25 | 3 |
Total attendance: 216,615 Average attendance: 54,154

== Atlanta vs. Houston ==
=== Game 1 ===
October 6, 2004 4:09 pm (EDT) at Turner Field in Atlanta, Georgia 77 °F (25 °C), sunny
| Team | 1 | 2 | 3 | 4 | 5 | 6 | 7 | 8 | 9 | R | H | E |
|---|---|---|---|---|---|---|---|---|---|---|---|---|
| Houston | 0 | 0 | 4 | 0 | 3 | 0 | 1 | 0 | 1 | 9 | 13 | 1 |
| Atlanta | 1 | 0 | 0 | 0 | 1 | 1 | 0 | 0 | 0 | 3 | 7 | 0 |
WP: Roger Clemens (1–0) LP: Jaret Wright (0–1); Home runs: HOU: Brad Ausmus (1), Lance Berkman (1), Carlos Beltrán (1), Jason Lane (1); ATL: Andruw Jones (1); Attendance: 41,464; Boxscore

Roger Clemens faced Jaret Wright in Game 1. The Braves loaded the bases in the bottom of the first on an error and two walks before Johnny Estrada's sacrifice fly put them up 1–0. Wright cruised through the first two innings but ran into trouble in the third. Brad Ausmus's leadoff homer tied the game and after two quick outs, Carlos Beltrán singled. Jeff Bagwell followed with an RBI double. Then Lance Berkman homered to put the Astros up 4–1. In the fifth, the Astros got two more on Beltrán's two-run homer. Kevin Gryboski relieved Wright and allowed a single to Jeff Bagwell and one out later, Jeff Kent's RBI single made it 7–1 Astros. In the bottom of the inning, Andruw Jones's two-out home run made it 7–2 Astros. The Braves scored their last run in the sixth when Rafael Furcal hit a leadoff triple and scored on a groundout by Marcus Giles. The Astros added to their lead in the seventh on an RBI single by Morgan Ensberg off Juan Cruz and the ninth on Jason Lane's leadoff home run off Chris Reitsma. Mike Gallo pitched a scoreless bottom of the ninth as the Astros' 9–3 win gave them a 1–0 series lead.

=== Game 2 ===
October 7, 2004 4:10 pm (EDT) at Turner Field in Atlanta, Georgia 72 °F (22 °C), cloudy
| Team | 1 | 2 | 3 | 4 | 5 | 6 | 7 | 8 | 9 | 10 | 11 | R | H | E |
|---|---|---|---|---|---|---|---|---|---|---|---|---|---|---|
| Houston | 1 | 0 | 1 | 0 | 0 | 0 | 0 | 0 | 0 | 0 | 0 | 2 | 4 | 1 |
| Atlanta | 0 | 0 | 0 | 0 | 0 | 0 | 1 | 1 | 0 | 0 | 2 | 4 | 14 | 0 |
WP: Antonio Alfonseca (1–0) LP: Dan Miceli (0–1); Home runs: HOU: Jeff Bagwell (1), Raul Chavez (1); ATL: Rafael Furcal (1); Attendance: 40,075; Boxscore

The Astros jumped off to an early 2–0 lead off Braves starter Mike Hampton on homers by Jeff Bagwell in the first and Raul Chavez in the third. Hampton would leave in the seventh with an injured arm. In the seventh, Astros starter Roy Oswalt, who was working on a shutout, began to falter as he allowed a pinch-hit double to DeWayne Wise. Then Rafael Furcal would single him home to make it 2–1. In a bizarre incident, the Astros' bullpen phone stopped working and someone had to check the status of their relievers. It caused a delay that Braves manager Bobby Cox protested. This occurred after Oswalt gave up his only run of the game. The bullpen would save the inning and the game remained 2–1 until the bottom of the eighth, when Adam LaRoche tied the game with an RBI double off Brad Lidge with the Astros five outs away from taking a commanding 2–0 lead in the series. As the game moved to extra innings, Charles Thomas singled with one out in the bottom of the 11th off Dan Miceli. After Eli Marrero struck out, Thomas stole second, then Rafael Furcal hit the game-winning two-run home run to tie the series at one game apiece.

=== Game 3 ===
October 9, 2004 12:10 pm (CDT) at Minute Maid Park in Houston, Texas 74 °F (23 °C), roof closed
| Team | 1 | 2 | 3 | 4 | 5 | 6 | 7 | 8 | 9 | R | H | E |
|---|---|---|---|---|---|---|---|---|---|---|---|---|
| Atlanta | 0 | 0 | 0 | 2 | 0 | 0 | 0 | 3 | 0 | 5 | 8 | 0 |
| Houston | 0 | 0 | 2 | 0 | 2 | 3 | 1 | 0 | X | 8 | 11 | 0 |
WP: Brandon Backe (1–0) LP: Paul Byrd (0–1) Sv: Brad Lidge (1); Home runs: ATL: Johnny Estrada (1), Andruw Jones (2); HOU: Carlos Beltrán (2); Attendance: 43,547; Boxscore

John Thomson faced Brandon Backe in Game 3. Thomson would leave the game in the first with a strained muscle on his left side after surrendering a double and a walk with one out. Paul Byrd came on in relief and got out of the inning, but, in the third, Carlos Beltrán put the Astros on top with a two-run homer. In the fourth, the Braves issued their response with a homer from Johnny Estrada. Andruw Jones then doubled and, after an intentional walk, scored on Byrd's RBI single to tie the game. In the bottom of the fifth, Lance Berkman walked with two outs before scoring on Jeff Kent's RBI double off the scoreboard, then Morgan Ensberg's RBI single made it 4–2 Astros and Byrd was gone. Against Antonio Alfonseca in the bottom of the sixth, the Astros put two men on and Alfonseca would leave in favor of Tom Martin, who allowed an RBI single to Lance Berkman. After Jeff Kent walked to load the bases, Ensberg's two-run double made it 7–2. They scored one more run when Brad Ausmus walked to lead off the seventh, moved to second on a wild pitch by Chris Reitsma, then to third on a ground out before scoring on a Mike Lamb sacrifice fly. The Braves put their first two men on in the eighth off Russ Springer and, after two strikeouts, Andruw Jones hit a three-run homer to cut the lead in half, but Brad Lidge pitched a perfect ninth for the save as the Astros' 8–5 win left them one win away from the NLCS.

=== Game 4 ===
October 10, 2004 12:10 pm (CDT) at Minute Maid Park in Houston, Texas 74 °F (23 °C), roof closed
| Team | 1 | 2 | 3 | 4 | 5 | 6 | 7 | 8 | 9 | R | H | E |
|---|---|---|---|---|---|---|---|---|---|---|---|---|
| Atlanta | 0 | 2 | 0 | 0 | 0 | 3 | 0 | 0 | 1 | 6 | 10 | 0 |
| Houston | 0 | 5 | 0 | 0 | 0 | 0 | 0 | 0 | 0 | 5 | 13 | 0 |
WP: John Smoltz (1–0) LP: Russ Springer (0–1); Home runs: ATL: Adam LaRoche (1); HOU: Craig Biggio (1); Attendance: 43,336; Boxscore

With their backs to the wall in Game 4, the Braves sent Russ Ortiz to the mound to face Roger Clemens. Three consecutive leadoff singles in the second put the Braves up 1–0, then Adam LaRoche's double play with runners on second and third made it 2–0 Braves. In the bottom of the inning, the Astros loaded the bases on two singles and a walk before Clemens's sacrifice fly cut the Braves' lead to 2–1. Then Craig Biggio hit a three-run homer to give the Astros a 4–2 lead. Carlos Beltrán doubled and scored on Jeff Bagwell's single to make it 5–2 Astros. Behind Clemens, the Astros were closing in on their first-ever postseason series win, but Clemens left the game in favor of Chad Qualls, who gave up a three-run homer to Adam LaRoche to tie the game in the sixth. The Braves took the lead in the ninth off Russ Springer when Rafael Furcal was hit by a pitch with two outs, stole second and scored on J. D. Drew's single. The Astros got two one-out singles in the bottom of the inning off John Smoltz, but Jeff Kent grounded into the game-ending double play to force a Game 5 in Atlanta.

=== Game 5 ===
October 11, 2004 8:19 pm (EDT) at Turner Field in Atlanta, Georgia 71 °F (22 °C), overcast
| Team | 1 | 2 | 3 | 4 | 5 | 6 | 7 | 8 | 9 | R | H | E |
|---|---|---|---|---|---|---|---|---|---|---|---|---|
| Houston | 0 | 2 | 1 | 0 | 0 | 1 | 5 | 3 | 0 | 12 | 17 | 1 |
| Atlanta | 0 | 0 | 0 | 0 | 2 | 0 | 1 | 0 | 0 | 3 | 9 | 1 |
WP: Roy Oswalt (1–0) LP: Jaret Wright (0–2); Home runs: HOU: Carlos Beltrán 2 (4), Jeff Bagwell (2); ATL: Rafael Furcal (2), Johnny Estrada (2); Attendance: 54,068; Boxscore

Roy Oswalt took on Jaret Wright in the clinching Game 5. The Astros, 0-7 all-time in a postseason series, were trying to break a dubious streak in which they had lost six consecutive playoff games in which they had a chance to clinch a postseason series victory. In the top of the second, a leadoff single was followed by a double before Morgan Ensberg's ground out and Jose Vizcaino's sacrifice fly scored a run each. Then Carlos Beltrán homered in the third to make it 3–0 Astros, but the Braves cut the lead to one on a pair of homers by Rafael Furcal (awaiting to serve a brief sentence for drunk driving that would start when the postseason ended for the Braves) and Johnny Estrada in the fifth. Beltrán's second homer in the sixth, however, made it 4–2. When Chris Reitsma took the mound in the seventh, the Astros were able to put the series away with a five-run explosion. Vizcaino hit a leadoff single, moved to second on a sacrifice bunt and scored on Craig Biggio's two-out single. Biggio scored on Beltrán's single before Jeff Bagwell's two-run homer's made it 8–2. Tom Martin relieved Reitsma and allowed a double to Lance Berkman, who scored on Jeff Kent's single. The Braves scored their last run of the series in the bottom of the inning on Johnny Estrada's RBI single off Mike Gallo. The Astros added to their lead in the eighth off Juan Cruz when Ensberg hit a leadoff double and scored on Jason Lane's two-out single. After Biggio doubled, Beltrán's two-run single made it 12–3. Dan Wheeler would come on to shut the door on the Braves in the ninth. Chipper Jones's flyout to left gave the Astros the win in Game 5 and gave them their first-ever postseason series win. After three losses to the Braves in the playoffs, the Astros won the right to play in the NLCS for the first time since 1986.

=== Composite line score ===
2004 NLDS (3–2): Houston Astros over Atlanta Braves

| Team | 1 | 2 | 3 | 4 | 5 | 6 | 7 | 8 | 9 | 10 | 11 | R | H | E |
|---|---|---|---|---|---|---|---|---|---|---|---|---|---|---|
| Houston Astros | 1 | 7 | 8 | 0 | 5 | 4 | 7 | 3 | 1 | 0 | 0 | 36 | 58 | 3 |
| Atlanta Braves | 1 | 2 | 0 | 2 | 3 | 4 | 2 | 4 | 1 | 0 | 2 | 21 | 48 | 1 |
Total attendance: 222,490 Average attendance: 44,498
