= 2004 National League Championship Series =

Major League Baseball playoff series

Team (Wins)	Managers	Season
St. Louis Cardinals (4)	Tony La Russa	105–57 (.648), GA: 13
Houston Astros (3)	Phil Garner	92–70 (.568), GB: 13
- Dates: October 13–21
- MVP: Albert Pujols (St. Louis)
- Umpires: Tim Welke, Eric Cooper, Gary Darling, Mike Winters, Ángel Hernández, Ed Rapuano

Broadcast
- Television: Fox
- TV announcers: Thom Brennaman, Steve Lyons, Bob Brenly, and Chris Myers
- Radio: ESPN
- Radio announcers: Dan Shulman and Dave Campbell
- NLDS: St. Louis Cardinals over Los Angeles Dodgers (3–1); Houston Astros over Atlanta Braves (3–2)

The 2004 National League Championship Series (NLCS) was a best-of-seven playoff series in Major League Baseball’s 2004 postseason pitting the overall #1 seeded St. Louis Cardinals and the fourth-seeded Houston Astros for the National League pennant. The Series began on October 13 and ended on October 21. The Cardinals held home-field advantage by virtue of having a better regular season record.

In a series in which all seven games were won by the home team, the Cardinals won 4–3 to advance to the World Series against the American League champion Boston Red Sox, which they would lose in a four-game sweep.

== Summary ==
=== St. Louis Cardinals vs. Houston Astros ===
St. Louis won the series, 4–3.

Game	Date	Score	Location	Time	Attendance
1	October 13	Houston Astros – 7, St. Louis Cardinals – 10	Busch Stadium (II)	3:15	52,323
2	October 14	Houston Astros – 4, St. Louis Cardinals – 6	Busch Stadium (II)	3:02	52,347
3	October 16	St. Louis Cardinals – 2, Houston Astros – 5	Minute Maid Park	2:57	42,896
4	October 17	St. Louis Cardinals – 5, Houston Astros – 6	Minute Maid Park	3:01	42,760
5	October 18	St. Louis Cardinals – 0, Houston Astros – 3	Minute Maid Park	2:33	43,045
6	October 20	Houston Astros – 4, St. Louis Cardinals – 6 (12)	Busch Stadium (II)	3:54	52,144
7	October 21	Houston Astros – 2, St. Louis Cardinals – 5	Busch Stadium (II)	2:51	52,140

== Game summaries ==
=== Game 1 ===
October 13, 2004 7:19 pm (CDT) at Busch Stadium (II) in St. Louis, Missouri 58 °F (14 °C), mostly clear
Team	1	2	3	4	5	6	7	8	9	R	H	E
Houston	2	0	0	2	0	0	0	2	1	7	10	1
St. Louis	2	0	0	0	2	6	0	0	X	10	12	0
WP: Woody Williams (1–0) LP: Chad Qualls (0–1) Sv: Jason Isringhausen (1); Home runs: HOU: Carlos Beltrán (1), Jeff Kent (1), Lance Berkman (1), Mike Lamb (1); STL: Albert Pujols (1); Attendance: 52,323; Boxscore

The series opener at St. Louis' Busch Stadium was a slugfest involving five home runs, 17 runs, and 22 hits, eventually won by St. Louis, 10–7. Houston struck the first blow of the series when Carlos Beltrán hit a two-run home run in the top of the first inning after a leadoff single off Woody Williams. The Cardinals answered with a home run by Albert Pujols in the bottom half after a one-out triple off Brandon Backe, tying the game at two. Houston took a 4–2 lead in the fourth inning on a two-run home run by Jeff Kent, but the Cards tied it again in the fifth on Larry Walker's RBI double off Backe and Scott Rolen's RBI single off Chad Qualls. In the sixth, Edgar Renteria and Reggie Sanders hit back-to-back leadoff singles before a sacrifice bunt moved them up one base. Pinch hitter Roger Cedeno's groundout scored Renteria to put the Cardinals up 5-4 for the first time in this game. Tony Womack followed with an RBI single, then stole second before scoring on Walker's single aided by shortstop Jose Vizcaino's error. After Qualls walked Pujols, Chad Harville in relief walked Rolen to load the bases before Jim Edmonds cleared them with a double to put the Cardinals up 10–4. The Astros cut it to 10−6 with a two-run home run from Lance Berkman in the eighth off Ray King. Next inning, a two-out solo home run from Mike Lamb off Julián Tavárez made it 10−7. Craig Biggio then hit a ground-rule double before Jason Isringhausen relieved Julián Tavárez and got Beltran to ground out to first on the first pitch to end the game. All seven of the Astros' runs in Game 1 were scored on home runs.

=== Game 2 ===
October 14, 2004 7:47 pm (CDT) at Busch Stadium (II) in St. Louis, Missouri 48 °F (9 °C), scattered showers
Team	1	2	3	4	5	6	7	8	9	R	H	E
Houston	1	0	0	1	1	0	1	0	0	4	10	1
St. Louis	0	0	0	0	4	0	0	2	X	6	9	0
WP: Julián Tavárez (1–0) LP: Dan Miceli (0–1) Sv: Jason Isringhausen (2); Home runs: HOU: Carlos Beltrán (2), Morgan Ensberg (1); STL: Larry Walker (1), Scott Rolen 2 (2), Albert Pujols (2); Attendance: 52,347; Boxscore

The Astros scored three runs off Cardinals' Matt Morris on home runs by Carlos Beltran in the first and Morgan Ensberg in the fourth. Lance Berkman added an RBI single in the fifth with two on, but in the bottom of the inning, two-run home runs from Larry Walker off starter Peter Munro and Scott Rolen off reliever Chad Harville put the Cardinals up 4−3. The Astros tied it in the seventh off Kiko Calero when Berkman hit a leadoff double, stole third and scored on Ensberg's single, but the Cardinals retook the lead in the bottom of the eighth inning with back-to-back home runs from Albert Pujols and Scott Rolen off Dan Miceli. Jason Isringhausen pitched a scoreless ninth despite allowing two walks as the Cardinals' 6−4 win put them up 2−0 in the series heading to Houston.

=== Game 3 ===
October 16, 2004 3:25 pm (CDT) at Minute Maid Park in Houston, Texas 74 °F (23 °C), roof closed
Team	1	2	3	4	5	6	7	8	9	R	H	E
St. Louis	1	1	0	0	0	0	0	0	0	2	5	0
Houston	3	0	0	0	0	0	0	2	X	5	8	0
WP: Roger Clemens (1–0) LP: Jeff Suppan (0–1) Sv: Brad Lidge (1); Home runs: STL: Larry Walker (2), Jim Edmonds (1); HOU: Jeff Kent (2), Carlos Beltrán (3), Lance Berkman (2); Attendance: 42,896; Boxscore

In the first game of the series played in Houston's Minute Maid Park, the Cardinals went up 1−0 in the first on Larry Walker's one-out home run, but the Astros tied it in the bottom of the inning off Jeff Suppan on Lance Berkman's RBI single before Jeff Kent's two-run home run put them up 3−1. Jim Edmonds' leadoff home run in the second cut it to 3−2, but the Astros added two insurance runs in the eighth on home runs from Carlos Beltran off Dan Haren and Berkman off Ray King. Roger Clemens pitched seven innings for the 5−2 win, which left the Astros trailing 2–1 in the series.

=== Game 4 ===
October 17, 2004 3:40 pm (CDT) at Minute Maid Park in Houston, Texas 74 °F (23 °C), roof closed
Team	1	2	3	4	5	6	7	8	9	R	H	E
St. Louis	3	0	1	1	0	0	0	0	0	5	9	0
Houston	1	0	2	0	0	2	1	0	X	6	9	0
WP: Dan Wheeler (1–0) LP: Julián Tavárez (1–1) Sv: Brad Lidge (2); Home runs: STL: Albert Pujols (3); HOU: Lance Berkman (3), Carlos Beltrán (4); Attendance: 42,760; Boxscore

The Cardinals struck first in Game 4 when Roy Oswalt walked Larry Walker with one out before Albert Pujols hit a two-run home run. Scott Rolen then doubled, moved to third on a groundout, and after a walk, scored on John Mabry's single to put the Cardinals up 3−0. The Astros cut it to 3−1 in the bottom of the inning when Carlos Beltran walked with one out off Jeff Bagwell's double off Jason Marquis. In the top of the third, Pujols drew a leadoff walk, moved to third on Rolen's single and scored on Jim Edmonds' sacrifice fly, but the Astros cut the lead to 4−3 when Beltran and Bagwell singled with one out and scored on Lance Berkman's double. Pujols's single with two on in the fourth put the Cardinals up 5−3, but the Astros cut the lead back to one on Berkman's leadoff home run in the sixth off Kiko Calero. Jose Vizcaino doubled two outs later and scored on Raul Chavez's single to tie the game. Next inning, Beltran's home run off Julián Tavárez put the Astros up 6−5. Brad Lidge pitched two shutout innings for the save as the Astros evened the series with the Cardinals at two games apiece. Beltrán tied records for the most home runs in a single postseason (8) and most consecutive postseason games with a home run (5). The latter record would be broken by Daniel Murphy in Game 4 of the 2015 NLCS.

=== Game 5 ===
October 18, 2004 7:51 pm (CDT) at Minute Maid Park in Houston, Texas 74 °F (23 °C), roof closed
Team	1	2	3	4	5	6	7	8	9	R	H	E
St. Louis	0	0	0	0	0	0	0	0	0	0	1	0
Houston	0	0	0	0	0	0	0	0	3	3	3	0
WP: Brad Lidge (1–0) LP: Jason Isringhausen (0–1); Home runs: STL: None; HOU: Jeff Kent (3); Attendance: 43,045; Boxscore

The Astros defeated the Cardinals 3–0 in Game 5 with Jeff Kent driving in the winning runs with a walk-off home run in the bottom of the ninth off Jason Isringhausen. Astros starter Brandon Backe took a perfect game into the fifth inning, when he walked Cardinals center fielder Jim Edmonds, and allowed only one hit (a single to second baseman Tony Womack in the sixth) in eight innings. The Cardinals' Woody Williams was nearly as effective, allowing only one hit (a two-out single to Jeff Bagwell in the first) and two walks over seven innings. Kent's home run was the first walkoff postseason home run for an Astro player since Alan Ashby in Game 1 of the 1981 National League Division Series. Houston led the best-of-seven series 3–2 and was one win away from their first World Series appearance.

=== Game 6 ===
October 20, 2004 3:12 pm (CDT) at Busch Stadium (II) in St. Louis, Missouri 57 °F (14 °C), overcast
Team	1	2	3	4	5	6	7	8	9	10	11	12	R	H	E
Houston	1	0	1	1	0	0	0	0	1	0	0	0	4	10	0
St. Louis	2	0	2	0	0	0	0	0	0	0	0	2	6	15	0
WP: Julián Tavárez (2–1) LP: Dan Miceli (0–2); Home runs: HOU: Mike Lamb (2); STL: Albert Pujols (4), Jim Edmonds (2); Attendance: 52,144; Boxscore

Returning to St. Louis, Matt Morris started Game 6 for the Cardinals, as did Pete Munro for the Astros. The scoring began with Carlos Beltrán walking with one out, stealing second, moving to third on a single, and scoring on Lance Berkman's sacrifice fly in the first. The Cardinals responded in the bottom of the inning with a two-run home run by Albert Pujols. In the third, Beltrán singled with two outs and scored on Jeff Bagwell's double to tie the game. Again, the Cardinals responded when Édgar Rentería hit a two-run single scoring Albert Pujols and Scott Rolen in the bottom of the inning. Mike Lamb's home run in the fourth cut the Cardinals' lead to 4−3. In the top of the ninth inning Bagwell hit a two-out single off Jason Isringhausen, scoring Morgan Ensberg for the tying run. The game went into extra innings and ended when Jim Edmonds, who hit 42 home runs in the regular season, hit a walk-off two-run home run in the bottom of the 12th off Dan Miceli, sending the series to a Game 7 showdown.

=== Game 7 ===
October 21, 2004 7:21 pm (CDT) at Busch Stadium (II) in St. Louis, Missouri 60 °F (16 °C), overcast
Team	1	2	3	4	5	6	7	8	9	R	H	E
Houston	1	0	1	0	0	0	0	0	0	2	3	0
St. Louis	0	0	1	0	0	3	0	1	X	5	9	1
WP: Jeff Suppan (1–1) LP: Roger Clemens (1–1) Sv: Jason Isringhausen (3); Home runs: HOU: Craig Biggio (1); STL: Scott Rolen (3); Attendance: 52,140; Boxscore

The final, deciding Game 7 started off with Astros' leadoff man Craig Biggio smacking a home run in the game's first at-bat off Cardinals' starter Jeff Suppan to make it 1–0. The Astros' threat continued in the second by putting two men on, but, thanks to a tremendous catch by center fielder Jim Edmonds, the Cardinals were able to get out of the inning unscathed. In the third, however, the Astros made it 2–0 with Carlos Beltrán, who walked and stole second, scoring on Jeff Bagwell's sacrifice fly aided by Edmonds's error. The Cardinals cut it to 2−1 in the bottom of the inning when Tony Womack hit a leadoff double, moved to third on a groundout, and scored on Jeff Suppan's bunt groundout. Then in the sixth Albert Pujols doubled to score Roger Cedeno from third to tie the game and Scott Rolen put the Redbirds ahead with a two-run home run off Roger Clemens. Fox Sports play-by-play announcer Thom Brennaman was on the call for Rolen's homer:

"Now Rolen, with the chance to give the Cardinals the lead for the first time tonight...Which he does, is it gone? YES!"

St. Louis added another run in the eighth off Roy Oswalt when pinch hitter Marlon Anderson hit a leadoff double, moved to third on a sacrifice bunt, and scored on Larry Walker's single. Jason Isringhausen shut down Houston in the ninth to win the Cardinals their first National League pennant in 17 years.

== Composite box ==
2004 NLCS (4–3): St. Louis Cardinals over Houston Astros

Team	1	2	3	4	5	6	7	8	9	10	11	12	R	H	E
St. Louis Cardinals	8	1	4	1	6	9	0	3	0	0	0	2	34	60	1
Houston Astros	9	0	4	4	1	2	2	4	5	0	0	0	31	53	2
Total attendance: 337,655 Average attendance: 48,236

== Aftermath ==
The Cardinals were swept by the Boston Red Sox in four games in the 2004 World Series. The Cardinals, who scored 56 runs and hit 18 homers over 11 games in the first two postseason series, scored just 12 runs and hit two home runs in the four games of the World Series, and only scored three runs combined over the final three games. Boston won its first World Series in 86 years and broke the Curse of the Bambino.

The following year, the Cardinals and Astros met again in the NLCS under similar circumstances, the Cardinals having won the division and securing the best record in the league, and having finished more than 10 games in front of the wild-card winning Astros. This time, the Astros defeated the Cardinals, four games to two, to reach their first ever World Series. Roy Oswalt, who had pedestrian numbers in the 2004 NLCS, was dominant in the rematch, going 2–0 with a 1.29 ERA over 14 innings. However, the Astros, like the 2004 Cardinals, were swept in the World Series by a curse-breaking team – the Chicago White Sox, who won their first title in 88 years and broke the Curse of the Black Sox.

The 2004 NLCS was the second ever postseason series to feature multiple walk-off home runs, the first being the 1988 World Series; this has since happened in the 2014 NLCS and 2019 ALCS. The 2004 NLCS is the only one of the four to have featured walk-off home runs in consecutive games. In 2011, Fangraphs, using a mathematical formula, named their 2004 NLCS match-up the 8th best postseason series of all-time.
