= 2004 Major League Baseball postseason =

2004 Major League Baseball playoffs

Tournament details
- Dates: October 5–27, 2004
- Teams: 8

Final positions
- Champions: Boston Red Sox (6th title)
- Runners-up: St. Louis Cardinals

Tournament statistics
- Most HRs: Carlos Beltrán (HOU) (8)
- Most SBs: Carlos Beltrán (HOU) (6)
- Most Ks (as pitcher): Pedro Martínez (BOS) (26)

Awards
- MVP: Manny Ramirez (BOS)

The 2004 Major League Baseball postseason was the playoff tournament of Major League Baseball for the 2004 season. The winners of the League Division Series would move on to the League Championship Series to determine the pennant winners that face each other in the World Series.

In the American League, the New York Yankees made their tenth straight postseason appearance, the Minnesota Twins returned for the third straight year, the Anaheim Angels returned for the second time in three years, and the Boston Red Sox returned for the second straight year.

In the National League, the St. Louis Cardinals returned for the fourth time in five years, the Atlanta Braves made their thirteenth straight appearance, the Houston Astros returned for the second time in four years, and the Los Angeles Dodgers made their first postseason appearance since 1996, marking the first time that both teams from the Greater Los Angeles area made the postseason.

The postseason began on October 5, 2004, and ended on October 27, 2004, with the Red Sox sweeping the Cardinals in the 2004 World Series. It was the Red Sox's first title since 1918, ending the Curse of the Bambino.

== Playoff seeds ==
American League Teams National League Teams

The following teams qualified for the postseason:

=== American League ===
1. New York Yankees – 101–61, AL East champions
2. Anaheim Angels – 92–70, AL West champions (5–4 head-to-head record vs. MIN)
3. Minnesota Twins – 92–70, AL Central champions (4–5 head-to-head record vs. ANA)
4. Boston Red Sox – 98–64

=== National League ===
1. St. Louis Cardinals – 105–57, NL Central champions
2. Atlanta Braves – 96–66, NL East champions
3. Los Angeles Dodgers – 93–69, NL West champions
4. Houston Astros – 92–70

== Playoff bracket ==
2004 was the last postseason until 2020 where both LCS went to 7 games.

=== Bracket ===
Division Series (ALDS, NLDS)
1	NY Yankees	3
3	Minnesota	1
American League
2	Anaheim	0
4	Boston	3
1	St. Louis	3
3	Los Angeles	1
National League
2	Atlanta	2
4	Houston	3

League Championship Series (NLCS, ALCS)
1	NY Yankees	3
4	Boston	4
1	St. Louis	4
4	Houston	3

World Series
AL4	Boston	4
NL1	St. Louis	0

Note: Two teams in the same division could not meet in the division series.

== American League Division Series ==
=== (1) New York Yankees vs. (3) Minnesota Twins ===
New York won the series, 3–1.

Game	Date	Score	Location	Time	Attendance
1	October 5	Minnesota Twins – 2, New York Yankees – 0	Yankee Stadium (I)	2:53	55,749
2	October 6	Minnesota Twins – 6, New York Yankees – 7 (12)	Yankee Stadium (I)	4:19	56,354
3	October 8	New York Yankees – 8, Minnesota Twins – 4	Hubert H. Humphrey Metrodome	3:02	54,803
4	October 9	New York Yankees – 6, Minnesota Twins – 5 (11)	Hubert H. Humphrey Metrodome	4:16	52,498

In a rematch of the previous year's series, the Yankees once again defeated the Twins to return to the ALCS for the seventh time in the past nine years.

Johan Santana pitched seven innings of shutout baseball as he outdueled New York’s Mike Mussina in a 2–0 Twins victory in Game 1. Game 2 was an offensive shootout that went into extra innings - the Twins took the lead in the top of the twelfth thanks to a solo home run from Torii Hunter, but in the bottom of the inning, the Yankees tied the game, and then won thanks to a sacrifice fly from Hideki Matsui that scored Derek Jeter, evening the series headed to Minneapolis. Game 3 was all Yankees, as they erased an early deficit to win 8–4 and take the series lead. In Game 4, the Twins led 5–2 in the top of the eighth, until Rubén Sierra hit a three-run home run to force extra innings. In the top of the eleventh, Alex Rodriguez scored off a wild pitch from Kyle Lohse which put the Yankees in the lead for good. Mariano Rivera retired the Twins 1-2-3 in the bottom of the eleventh to close out the series.

The Twins would not win another postseason game until 2023.

=== (2) Anaheim Angels vs. (4) Boston Red Sox ===
Boston won the series, 3–0.

Game	Date	Score	Location	Time	Attendance
1	October 5	Boston Red Sox – 9, Anaheim Angels – 3	Angel Stadium of Anaheim	3:04	44,608
2	October 6	Boston Red Sox – 8, Anaheim Angels – 3	Angel Stadium of Anaheim	3:48	45,118
3	October 8	Anaheim Angels – 6, Boston Red Sox – 8 (10)	Fenway Park	4:11	35,547

This was the second postseason meeting between the Angels and Red Sox. They last met in the ALCS in 1986, which the Red Sox won in seven games before falling in the World Series. The Red Sox again defeated the Angels, this time in a sweep, to return to the ALCS for the third time in five years.

Curt Schilling pitched six solid innings as the Red Sox blew out the Angels in Game 1 on the road. Pedro Martínez pitched seven solid innings as the Red Sox again blew out the Angels to take a 2–0 series lead headed home. Game 3 was a close offensive shootout that went into extra innings, which was won by the Red Sox as David Ortiz completed the sweep for the Red Sox with a walk-off two-run home run in the bottom of the tenth.

Both teams would meet again in the ALDS in 2007, 2008, and 2009, with the Red Sox winning the former two and the Angels winning the latter.

== National League Division Series ==
=== (1) St. Louis Cardinals vs. (3) Los Angeles Dodgers ===
St. Louis won the series, 3–1.

Game	Date	Score	Location	Time	Attendance
1	October 5	Los Angeles Dodgers – 3, St. Louis Cardinals – 8	Busch Stadium (II)	3:11	52,127
2	October 7	Los Angeles Dodgers – 3, St. Louis Cardinals – 8	Busch Stadium (II)	3:36	52,228
3	October 9	St. Louis Cardinals – 0, Los Angeles Dodgers – 4	Dodger Stadium	2:23	55,992
4	October 10	St. Louis Cardinals – 6, Los Angeles Dodgers – 2	Dodger Stadium	3:21	56,268

This was the second postseason meeting in the history of the Cardinals–Dodgers rivalry. They previously met in the NLCS in 1985, which the Cardinals won in six games before falling in the World Series. The Cardinals once again defeated the Dodgers, this time in four games, to return to the NLCS for the third time in five years.

Albert Pujols, Larry Walker, Jim Edmonds, and Mike Matheny all homered for the Cardinals as they blew out the Dodgers in Game 1. The Cardinals blew out the Dodgers again in Game 2 to take a 2–0 series lead headed to Los Angeles. In Game 3, José Lima pitched a five-hit complete game shutout for the Dodgers as they won 4–0 to get on the board in the series. Game 4 was tied early, until a three-run home run by Pujols in the top of the fourth put the Cardinals ahead for good, closing out the series.

Both teams would meet again in the NLDS in 2009, the NLCS in 2013, the NLDS again in 2014 again, and the Wild Card game in 2021, with the Dodgers taking the first and last series, and the Cardinals winning the two in between.

=== (2) Atlanta Braves vs. (4) Houston Astros ===
Houston won the series, 3–2.

Game	Date	Score	Location	Time	Attendance
1	October 6	Houston Astros – 9, Atlanta Braves – 3	Turner Field	3:08	41,464
2	October 7	Houston Astros – 2, Atlanta Braves – 4 (11)	Turner Field	3:27	40,075
3	October 9	Atlanta Braves – 5, Houston Astros – 8	Minute Maid Park	3:19	43,547
4	October 10	Atlanta Braves – 6, Houston Astros – 5	Minute Maid Park	3:24	43,336
5	October 11	Houston Astros – 12, Atlanta Braves – 3	Turner Field	3:12	54,068

In the fourth postseason meeting between these two teams, the Astros finally defeated the Braves in a tight five-game series to return to the NLCS for the first time since 1986.

Brad Ausmus, Lance Berkman, Carlos Beltrán, and Jason Lane all homered for the Astros as they blew out the Braves in Game 1 on the road. In Game 2, the Astros held a 2–1 going into the bottom of the eighth, until the Braves forced extra innings with an Adam LaRoche RBI double. Rafael Furcal won the game for the Braves in the bottom of the eleventh with a walk-off two-run home run to even the series headed to Houston. Game 3 was an offensive shootout that was won by the Astros as their bullpen stopped a late rally by the Braves to regain the series lead. In Game 4, the Astros lead 5–2 early, but the Braves rallied to win thanks to Furcal scoring the go-ahead run in the top of the ninth to send the series back to Atlanta for a decisive fifth game. However, it wasn’t enough as the Astros blew out the Braves by nine runs in front of their home fans to advance. This was the first playoff series ever won by the Astros.

Both teams would meet again in the NLDS the next year, which the Astros also won before falling in the World Series. They would also meet again in the 2021 World Series, which the Braves won in six games.

== American League Championship Series ==
=== (1) New York Yankees vs. (4) Boston Red Sox ===
Boston won the series, 4–3.

Game	Date	Score	Location	Time	Attendance
1	October 12	Boston Red Sox – 7, New York Yankees – 10	Yankee Stadium (I)	3:20	56,135
2	October 13	Boston Red Sox – 1, New York Yankees – 3	Yankee Stadium (I)	3:15	56,136
3	October 16	New York Yankees – 19, Boston Red Sox – 8	Fenway Park	4:20	35,126
4	October 17	New York Yankees – 4, Boston Red Sox – 6 (12)	Fenway Park	5:02	34,826
5	October 18	New York Yankees – 4, Boston Red Sox – 5 (14)	Fenway Park	5:49	35,120
6	October 19	Boston Red Sox – 4, New York Yankees – 2	Yankee Stadium (I)	3:50	56,128
7	October 20	Boston Red Sox – 10, New York Yankees – 3	Yankee Stadium (I)	3:31	56,129

This was the third postseason meeting of the Red Sox–Yankees rivalry. In one of the most shocking results in North American sports history, the Red Sox overcame a three-games-to-none series deficit to defeat the defending American League champion Yankees in seven games, returning to the World Series for the first time since 1986 (in the process denying a rematch of the 1964 World Series between the Yankees and Cardinals).

Game 1 was an offensive shootout between both teams, which was won by the Yankees. In Game 2, Jon Lieber outdueled Pedro Martínez in a pitchers duel as the Yankees narrowly won to take a 2–0 series lead headed to Fenway Park. The Yankees went up 3–0 in the series after a 19–8 bludgeoning of the Red Sox in Game 3. After the game, Bob Ryan of The Boston Globe wrote, "They are down, 3–0, after last night's 19–8 rout, and, in this sport, that is an official death sentence. Soon it will be over, and we will spend another dreary winter lamenting this and lamenting that." However, thanks to walk-off heroics from David Ortiz, the Red Sox narrowly won Games 4 and 5, in twelve and fourteen innings respectively, to force the series back to the Bronx. Game 6 became known as the “Bloody Sock Game”, as Red Sox starter Curt Schilling pitched with a torn tendon sheath in his right ankle that was sutured in place by the Red Sox team doctors. The Red Sox jumped out to a 4–0 lead in the top of the fourth thanks to a three-run home run by Mark Bellhorn, and despite the Yankees cutting their lead to two in the bottom of the eighth, Schilling and Keith Foulke kept the Yankees’ offense at bay to win 4–2 to force a seventh game, becoming the first team in MLB history to force a Game 7 after being down 3–0 in the series. The Red Sox blew out the Yankees in Game 7 in part thanks to home runs from Ortiz, Bellhorn, and Johnny Damon, clinching the pennant and completing an improbable comeback. Game 7 was the last ALCS game ever played at the original Yankee Stadium.

The Red Sox became the third team in North American sports history to overcome a 3–0 series deficit to win a playoff series, joining the 1942 Toronto Maple Leafs and the 1975 New York Islanders, who did it in the NHL. To this day, they remain the only team in the MLB to accomplish such a feat. The Houston Astros overcame a 3–0 series deficit in the 2020 ALCS to force a seventh game, but were unable to win the pennant like the Red Sox did. The Red Sox would win their next pennant in 2007 over the Cleveland Indians in seven games after trailing 3–1 in the series en route to another World Series title.

This was the first ALCS loss for the Yankees since 1980. They would return to the ALCS in 2009, and defeated the Los Angeles Angels of Anaheim in six games en route to their most recent World Series championship.

The 2004 ALCS marked a turning point for both the Yankees and Red Sox. The Yankees entered a decline after the series loss, winning one more World Series in 2009, then they would fail to win the pennant during the next decade, and would lose to the Red Sox two more times in the postseason, in 2018 and 2021. The opposite was true for the Red Sox, as the team trended upwards, winning the World Series, and winning three more championships, in 2007, 2013, and 2018.

== National League Championship Series ==
=== (1) St. Louis Cardinals vs. (4) Houston Astros ===
St. Louis won the series, 4–3.

Game	Date	Score	Location	Time	Attendance
1	October 13	Houston Astros – 7, St. Louis Cardinals – 10	Busch Stadium (II)	3:15	52,323
2	October 14	Houston Astros – 4, St. Louis Cardinals – 6	Busch Stadium (II)	3:02	52,347
3	October 16	St. Louis Cardinals – 2, Houston Astros – 5	Minute Maid Park	2:57	42,896
4	October 17	St. Louis Cardinals – 5, Houston Astros – 6	Minute Maid Park	3:01	42,760
5	October 18	St. Louis Cardinals – 0, Houston Astros – 3	Minute Maid Park	2:33	43,045
6	October 20	Houston Astros – 4, St. Louis Cardinals – 6 (12)	Busch Stadium (II)	3:54	52,144
7	October 21	Houston Astros – 2, St. Louis Cardinals – 5	Busch Stadium (II)	2:51	52,140

This was the first postseason meeting between the Cardinals and Astros. In a series where neither team won an away game, the Cardinals defeated the Astros in seven games to return to the World Series for the first time since 1987.

Game 1 was a back-and-forth offensive shootout that was won by the Cardinals. Game 2 was the same, and the Cardinals would win again thanks to back-to-back home runs from Albert Pujols and Scott Rolen in the bottom of the eighth, giving the Cardinals a 2–0 series lead heading to Houston. Roger Clemens pitched seven solid innings as the Astros took Game 3 to get on the board in the series. In Game 4, the Cardinals led 5-3 going into the sixth, but the Astros put up three unanswered runs across the next two innings to even the series at two, capped off by a go-ahead home run by Carlos Beltrán in the bottom of the seventh. Brandon Backe, Brad Lidge, and the Houston bullpen would silence the Cardinals’ bats in Game 5 to take a 3–2 series lead heading back to St. Louis, now a game away from their first trip to the World Series. However, the Astros faltered. In Game 6, the Astros came back to force extras thanks to Jeff Bagwell’s RBI single, but the Cardinals survived as Jim Edmonds hit a walk-off two-run homer in the bottom of the twelfth to force a seventh game. In Game 7, the Astros lead 2-1 after five innings and were ten outs away from securing their first pennant, but the Cardinals came back in the bottom of the sixth, as Rolen hit a two-run homer to put the Cardinals in the lead for good, and then added another unanswered run in the eighth to secure the pennant.

Both teams would meet again in the NLCS the next year, which the Astros won in six games before being swept by the Chicago White Sox in the World Series, who won their first title in 88 years.

The Cardinals would win their next pennant two years later over the New York Mets in seven games en route to a World Series title.

== 2004 World Series ==
=== (AL4) Boston Red Sox vs. (NL1) St. Louis Cardinals ===
Boston won the series, 4–0.

Game	Date	Score	Location	Time	Attendance
1	October 23	St. Louis Cardinals – 9, Boston Red Sox – 11	Fenway Park	4:00	35,035
2	October 24	St. Louis Cardinals – 2, Boston Red Sox – 6	Fenway Park	3:20	35,001
3	October 26	Boston Red Sox – 4, St. Louis Cardinals – 1	Busch Stadium (II)	2:58	52,015
4	October 27	Boston Red Sox – 3, St. Louis Cardinals – 0	Busch Stadium (II)	3:14	52,037

This was the third World Series meeting between the Cardinals and Red Sox. It was also the ninth meeting between teams from Boston and St. Louis for a major professional sports championship. This previously happened in two World Series (1946, 1967), four NBA Finals (1957, 1958, 1960, 1961), Super Bowl XXXVI in 2002, and the 1970 Stanley Cup Final. The previous meetings in 1946 and 1967 were both won by the Cardinals. However, history would not repeat itself, as the Red Sox upset the 105-win Cardinals in a sweep to win their first title since 1918, ending the Curse of the Bambino. This was the third consecutive World Series won by a Wild Card team.

Game 1 was an offensive shootout between both teams that was won by the Red Sox, which saw David Ortiz hit a three-run home run in his first World Series at-bat. Curt Schilling pitched six solid innings as the Red Sox won Game 2 by a 6–2 score to go up 2–0 in the series headed to St. Louis. Pedro Martínez pitched seven innings of shutout baseball in Game 3 as the Red Sox won 4–1 to take a commanding three games to none series lead. Derek Lowe also pitched seven shutout innings in Game 4 as the Red Sox shut out the Cardinals to end their long championship drought. Game 4 was the last World Series game ever played at Busch Memorial Stadium. The Cardinals became the eighth 100+ win team to be swept in the postseason.

Along with the New England Patriots winning Super Bowl XXXVIII, the Boston metropolitan area had both World Series and Super Bowl champions in the same season or calendar year. The Red Sox would return to the World Series three years later, and swept the Colorado Rockies for their seventh title.

The Cardinals would return to the World Series two years later, and defeated the Detroit Tigers in five games to end a 24-year title drought.

== Broadcasting ==
This was the second of four years that Division Series games aired across ESPN, ESPN2, and Fox. Fox then aired both League Championship Series and the World Series.
