= List of Houston Astros managers =

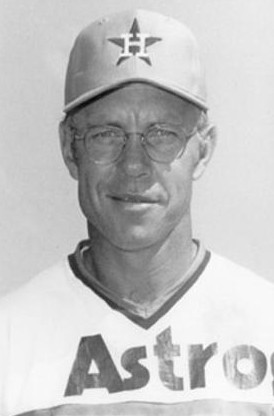
Bill Virdon is the all-time winningest manager in Astro history; he won 544 games while leading the Astros to their first postseason berth in 1980 and two division titles.

The Houston Astros are a professional baseball franchise based in Houston, Texas. They are a member of the American League West Division in Major League Baseball. The team joined MLB in 1962 as an expansion team named the Houston Colt .45s and changed their name to the Houston Astros in 1965. The team won their first NL Championship in 2005. Having first played in Colt Stadium (1962–1964), and later in The Astrodome, now known as the Reliant Astrodome (1965–1999), the Astros have played their home games at Minute Maid Park, which was first named The Ballpark at Union Station, since 2000. The current manager position is vacant.

There have been 25 managers for the Astros franchise. The team's first manager was Harry Craft, who managed for three seasons. Bill Virdon is the franchise's all-time leader for the most regular-season games managed (1066) and the most regular-season game wins (544). Dusty Baker is the franchise's all-time leader in career playoff games managed (53) and playoff games won (34). Salty Parker is the Astros' all-time leader for the highest regular-season winning percentage, as he has only managed one game, which he won. Of the managers who have managed a minimum of 162 games (one season), Baker has the highest regular-season winning percentage with .594. Leo Durocher is the only Astros manager to have been elected into the Baseball Hall of Fame. Durocher and Baker each achieved their 2,000th managerial win with the Astros. Garner, Hinch, and Baker are the only managers to have won league pennants with the franchise, Garner winning one in the National League in 2005, Hinch winning two in the American League in 2017 and 2019, and Baker winning two in 2021 and 2022. Larry Dierker is the only Astros manager to have had his uniform number retired by the Astros, with his uniform number 49 retired by the Astros in 2002. Dierker is also the sixth manager in MLB history to win a division championship in his first season for the Astros in 1997. Lanier and Dierker are the only managers to have won a Manager of the Year Award with the Astros, winning it in 1986 and 1998 respectively. Grady Hatton, Lanier, Dierker, and Cooper have spent their entire managing careers with the Astros.

== Key ==
#	Number of managers^{[a]}
GM	Regular-season games managed
W	Regular-season wins
L	Regular-season losses
Win%	Regular-season winning percentage
PGM	Playoff games managed
PW	Playoff wins
PL	Playoff losses
PWin%	Playoff winning percentage
*	Spent entire MLB managing career with the Colt .45s / Astros
**	Interim manager only
***	Acting manager during manager's medical leave of absence
†	Elected into the Baseball Hall of Fame as a manager
§	Number retired by the Colt .45s / Astros franchise

== Managers ==
Note: Statistics are correct as of the end of the 2026 season.

#	Image	Manager	Years	Games	Wins	Losses	Pct.	PA	PW	PWL	Pct.	Notes
1		Harry Craft	1962–1964	471	191	280	.406	—	—	—	—	
2		Luman Harris	1964–1965	175	70	105	.400	—	—	—	—	
3		Grady Hatton*	1966–1968	385	164	221	.426	—	—	—	—	
4		Harry Walker	1968–1972	708	355	353	.501	—	—	—	—	
5		Salty Parker**	1972	1	1	0	1.000	—	—	—	—	
6		Leo Durocher†	1972–1973	193	98	95	.508	—	—	—	—	
7		Preston Gómez	1974–1975	289	128	161	.443	—	—	—	—	
8		Bill Virdon	1975–1982	1,066	544	522	.510	10	4	6	.400	
9		Bob Lillis	1982–1985	537	276	261	.514	—	—	—	—	
10		Hal Lanier*	1986–1988	486	254	232	.523	6	2	4	.333	1986 NL Manager of the Year
11		Art Howe	1989–1993	810	392	418	.484	—	—	—	—	
12		Terry Collins	1994–1996	421	224	197	.532	—	—	—	—	
13		Larry Dierker*§	1997–2001	810	448	362	.553	14	2	12	.143	1998 NL Manager of the Year
14		Matt Galante***	1999	27	13	14	.481	—	—	—	—	
15		Jimy Williams	2002–2004	412	215	197	.522	—	—	—	—	
16		Phil Garner	2004–2007	529	277	252	.524	26	13	13	.500	2005 NL championship
17		Cecil Cooper*	2007–2009	341	171	170	.501	—	—	—	—	
18		Dave Clark**	2009	13	4	9	.308	—	—	—	—	
19		Brad Mills*	2010–2012	445	171	274	.384	—	—	—	—	
20		Tony DeFrancesco**	2012	41	16	25	.390	—	—	—	—	
21		Bo Porter*	2013–2014	300	110	190	.367	—	—	—	—	
22		Tom Lawless**	2014	24	11	13	.458	—	—	—	—	
23		A. J. Hinch	2015–2019	810	481	329	.594	50	28	22	.560	2017 World Series Champion; 2019 AL championship
24		Dusty Baker	2020–2023	546	320	226	.586	53	34	19	.642	2022 World Series Champion; 2021 AL championship
25		Joe Espada	2024–2026	485	256	229	.528	4	0	4	.000	
26		Brad Ausmus	2027-present	—	—	—	—	—	—	—	—	

== Notes ==
- ^{a} A running total of the number of managers of the Colt .45s/Astros. Thus, any manager who has two or more separate terms as a manager is only counted once.
- ^{b} Each year is linked to an article about that particular MLB season.
