= Jimy Williams =

American baseball player and manager (1943–2024)

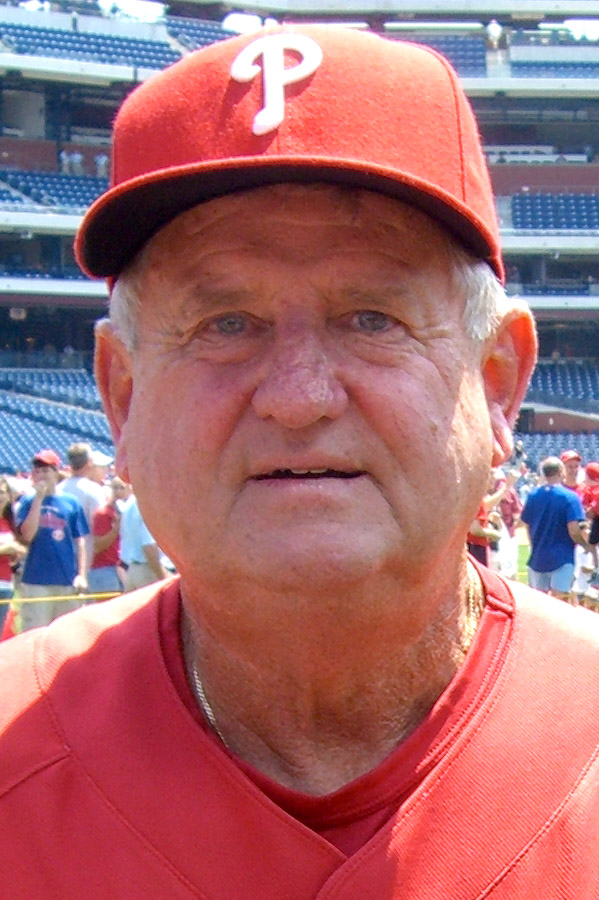
- Williams in 2007
- Second baseman / Shortstop / Manager
- Born: October 4, 1943; Santa Maria, California, U.S.
- Died: January 26, 2024 (aged 80); Tarpon Springs, Florida, U.S.
- Batted: Right Threw: Right

MLB debut
- April 26, 1966, for the St. Louis Cardinals

Last MLB appearance
- September 21, 1967, for the St. Louis Cardinals

MLB statistics
- Batting average: .231
- Hits: 3
- Runs batted in: 1
- Managerial record: 910–790
- Winning %: .535
- Stats at Baseball Reference
- Managerial record at Baseball Reference

Teams
- As player: St. Louis Cardinals (1966–1967); As manager: Toronto Blue Jays (1986–1989); Boston Red Sox (1997–2001); Houston Astros (2002–2004); As coach: Toronto Blue Jays (1980–1985); Atlanta Braves (1990–1996); Philadelphia Phillies (2007–2008)

Career highlights and awards
- 2× World Series champion (1995, 2008); AL Manager of the Year (1999)

James Francis Williams (October 4, 1943 – January 26, 2024) was an American professional baseball infielder, coach and manager in Major League Baseball (MLB). He played for the St. Louis Cardinals in 1966 and 1967 and managed the Toronto Blue Jays, Boston Red Sox, and Houston Astros.

Williams was born in Santa Maria, California, and briefly appeared in two MLB seasons as a second baseman and shortstop for the Cardinals. After his playing career, he managed in the California Angels' minor league system before coaching at the MLB level and then managing for the Blue Jays (1986–1989), Red Sox (1997–2001) and Astros (2002–2004). Williams was the American League Manager of the Year in 1999. He also coached for Toronto, the Atlanta Braves and Philadelphia Phillies. As a coach, Williams was a member of the 1995 World Series and 2008 World Series champions.

== Early life and career ==
James Francis Williams was born on October 4, 1943, in Santa Maria, California. He was one of seven children; his father was a cattle rancher and his mother was a teacher. Williams' father died when he was a teenager.

Williams, a former infielder who threw and batted right-handed, graduated from Arroyo Grande High School in Arroyo Grande, California, and California State University, Fresno, where he played college baseball for the Fresno State Bulldogs. He first spelled his name "Jimy" as a prank in high school. At Fresno, Williams earned a bachelor's degree in agribusiness in 1964.

During the 1965 season, he played for the Alaska Goldpanners of Fairbanks, along with teammates Graig Nettles and Tom Seaver. Williams signed originally with the Boston Red Sox and was taken in the 1965 Rule 5 draft by the St. Louis Cardinals. He appeared in 14 games for the Cardinals over two seasons, 1966–67, but had only 13 at bats, compiling a batting average of .231. Williams' first hit came off Juan Marichal.

Before the 1968 season, the Cardinals traded Williams and Pat Corrales to the Cincinnati Reds for Johnny Edwards. After the 1968 season, the Montreal Expos selected Williams in the 1968 expansion draft; then he played the 1969 AAA season for the Vancouver Mounties. He spent the 1970 season playing in AAA for the Buffalo Bisons and the Winnipeg Whips, followed by the 1971 season with the Winnipeg Whips and the Tidewater Tides.

== Coaching and managerial career ==
=== Early career, Toronto Blue Jays, and Atlanta Braves ===
Williams's playing career ended due to a shoulder injury. He began his minor league managing career with the California Angels in 1974. Williams soon reached the Triple-A level and was appointed the third base coach of the Toronto Blue Jays in 1980.

Williams remained as Toronto's third base coach for six seasons. After the 1985 season, Blue Jays' manager Bobby Cox left the organization to rejoin the Atlanta Braves and the Blue Jays named Williams as their new manager. He was the Blue Jays' manager until the 1989 season, when he was fired May 14 and replaced by Cito Gaston after the team got off to a 12–24 start. Under Gaston, the Blue Jays went 77–49 for the rest of the season and won the American League East title. Williams finished with a record of 281 wins and 241 losses.

Williams rejoined Cox as their third base coach for the Braves in 1991. During the 1992 National League Championship Series, he waved home Sid Bream after seeing Barry Bonds having to make a difficult throw on a single while the game was tied in the ninth inning. Bream made the slide that would win the pennant for the Braves in that game. He was their third base coach through the 1996 season, including the Braves 1995 World Series championship season. While with the Braves, Williams developed a reputation as an outstanding teaching coach, especially adept at working with infielders.

=== Boston Red Sox ===
On November 19, 1996, the Boston Red Sox hired Williams as their new manager; the team had fired Kevin Kennedy immediately after the season ended, and Williams was hired by general manager Dan Duquette after a lengthy search that saw many names considered (such as Grady Little and Whitey Herzog). The 1997 team was hindered by injuries and went 78–84. The following year, they went 92–70, which was good enough for second best in the American League and a wild-card spot. They lost to the Cleveland Indians in the Division Series.

In 1999, the Red Sox went 94–68 and clinched a wild card spot again. On August 14, Williams, having seen ace Pedro Martinez arrive late for his scheduled start, elected to not let him pitch in the game despite the objections of Martinez. Nine innings later, Martinez had received the win after being called to pitch in the 6th inning and threw four innings in relief. The Sox reached the American League Championship Series after beating the Indians in an ALDS rematch, but lost to their arch-rivals, the New York Yankees in five games. Williams won the 1999 Major League Baseball Manager of the Year Award for the American League.

Williams' relationship with general manager Dan Duquette soured, with players such as Carl Everett also having disagreements with Williams, who liked to constantly change the batting lineup for games. Williams developed a feud with Everett, which saw Duquette back Everett publicly in the late stages of the 2000 season, which saw them go 85–77 and miss the playoffs handily. The ensuing disagreement soured the already tense dynamic between Williams and Duquette, to the point where team CEO John Harrington had to call a meeting between Williams and Duquette to try and smooth things over.

When the Red Sox—depleted by injuries—slumped in August 2001, Duquette fired Williams. The club then lost 27 of 43 games under Duquette's appointee, Joe Kerrigan. Williams finished his tenure as Red Sox manager with a record of 414 wins and 352 losses.

=== Houston Astros and Philadelphia Phillies ===
On November 1, 2001, Williams was hired to become manager of the Houston Astros. The other reported candidates were Jim Fregosi and Tony Pena. The Astros went 84–78 in 2002 and were not a particularly serious threat that season. At one point in his tenure, he apparently came up with a suggestion to name the foul poles at Minute Maid Park "fowl poles" and do branding with chicken restaurants. As it turned out, the Astros would do a partnership with Chick-fil-A to brand the poles as such in 2006, which as of 2025 is still present on the poles at the park. He made it clear to owner Drayton McLane that he was not particularly interested in playing ball with the media, which in turn led to a perception of him being distant, although it was said that Williams was quite friendly when talking about baseball rather than off-the-field issues. The Astros fell short by one game for the NL Central title to the Chicago Cubs in 2003, losing six of their last nine games. However, expectations were raised in the offseason when ownership signed pitchers Roger Clemens and Andy Pettitte. The 2004 season did not get off to a great start for Williams, and they went into the All-Star break at 44–44 after losing five of seven games in their last road trip before returning to Houston for the break. Williams was assigned to serve as a National League coach at the 2004 All-Star Game, held in Houston. When he was announced to the crowd at Houston's Minute Maid Park, he was greeted with jeers; the next morning, general manager Gerry Hunsicker fired him, citing the past week as a turning point. Hunsicker was quoted as saying, "The message we wanted to send is that we needed a dramatic change. The more new faces, the more new energy that we can bring in here, the greater impact we might make. My biggest regret was the fact that this week couldn't have been any more awkward for all of us. "The unfortunate reaction he got from the fans, and the speculation that became rampant in the last day or so was very unfortunate. He deserved better."

Williams was replaced by Phil Garner, who Hunsicker had contacted about taking the job earlier. Garner would lead the Astros to the 2004 National League Championship Series, but they fell one game short of going to Houston's first ever World Series (the following year, Garner led the Astros to the World Series). Williams finished with a record of 215 wins and 197 losses. Williams described his tenure as one where he felt bad about not making the playoffs while stating, "We just couldn't hit a lick that season. Remember? We couldn't have hit if we'd gone up there with a banjo. We just couldn't get anything going. And it was about three weeks after I left that they finally started playing well. Those things happen."

On October 16, 2006, Williams was named the Philadelphia Phillies bench coach and continued with that role through the Phillies 2008 World Series championship season. Williams decided not to return to his position for the 2009 season. Phillies manager Charlie Manuel said, "As far as I know, it's not like that he left on a bad note."

=== Managerial record ===
As of February 13, 2014

Team	Year	Regular season					Postseason			
Team	Year	Games	Won	Lost	Win %	Finish	Won	Lost	Win %	Result
TOR	1986	162	86	76	.531	4th in AL East	–	–	–	–
TOR	1987	162	96	66	.593	2nd in AL East	–	–	–	–
TOR	1988	162	87	75	.537	3rd in AL East	–	–	–	–
TOR	1989	36	12	24	.333	fired	–	–	–	–
TOR total		522	281	241	.538		0	0	–	
BOS	1997	162	78	84	.481	4th in AL East	–	–	–	–
BOS	1998	162	92	70	.568	2nd in AL East	1	3	.250	Lost ALDS (CLE)
BOS	1999	162	94	68	.580	2nd in AL East	4	6	.400	Lost ALCS (NYY)
BOS	2000	162	85	77	.525	2nd in AL East	–	–	–	–
BOS	2001	118	65	53	.551	fired	–	–	–	–
BOS total		766	414	352	.540		5	9	.357	
HOU	2002	162	84	78	.519	2nd in NL Central	–	–	–	–
HOU	2003	162	87	75	.537	2nd in NL Central	–	–	–	–
HOU	2004	88	44	44	.500	fired	–	–	–	–
HOU total		412	215	197	.522		0	0	–	
Total		1,700	910	790	.535		5	9	.357	

== Personal life and death ==
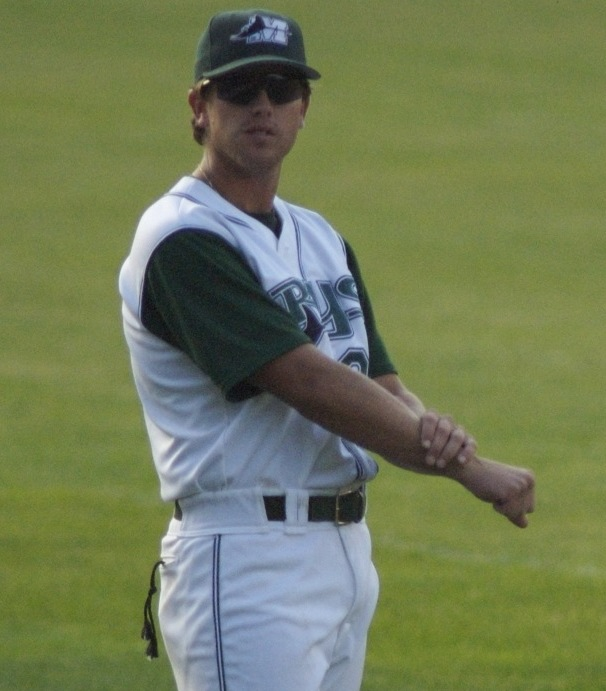
Williams' son, Brady, in 2006

Williams and his wife, Peggy, had four children. Two of his sons are former professional baseball players who have managed teams in the minor leagues. Brady was chosen by the Red Sox in the 45th round of the 1999 Major League Baseball draft and had a seven-year playing career as an infielder in minor league and independent league baseball. He managed in the Tampa Bay Rays' system from 2009 to 2022, and in 2023 was named third-base coach of the MLB Rays. Shawn Williams also had a seven-year playing career (2006–2012), including four years in the Tampa Bay organization; primarily an infielder, he played every position but center fielder. He has been a manager in the Phillies' farm system since 2014.

Williams was a distant relative of Red Sox great Ted Williams.

Williams lived in Palm Harbor, Florida. He died after a short illness at age 80, on January 26, 2024, at AdventHealth North Pinellas in Tarpon Springs, Florida.

== See also ==
Sporting positions
Preceded by Dave Garcia	El Paso Diablos manager 1975	Succeeded by Bobby Knoop
Preceded by Norm Sherry; Deron Johnson	Salt Lake City Gulls manager 1976–1977; 1979	Succeeded by Deron Johnson; Moose Stubing
Preceded by Franchise established	Springfield Redbirds manager 1978	Succeeded by Hal Lanier
Preceded by Jackie Moore	Toronto Blue Jays third base coach 1980–1985	Succeeded by John McLaren
Preceded by Roy Majtyka	Atlanta Braves third base coach 1991–1996	Succeeded by Bobby Dews
Preceded by Gary Varsho	Philadelphia Phillies bench coach 2007–2008	Succeeded by Pete Mackanin
