= Jason Alfaro =

American baseball player (born 1977)

- Shortstop
- Born: November 29, 1977 (age 48); San Antonio, Texas, U.S.
- Batted: Right Threw: Right

MLB debut
- September 9, 2004, for the Houston Astros

Last MLB appearance
- October 1, 2004, for the Houston Astros

MLB statistics
- Batting average: .182
- Runs batted in: 0
- Home runs: 0
- Stats at Baseball Reference

Teams
- Houston Astros (2004)

Jason Alfaro (born November 29, 1977) is an American former Major League/Minor League baseball player. He made his debut with the Houston Astros in 2004.

Alfaro last played for the New Orleans Zephyrs, the Triple-A affiliate of the New York Mets in 2007.
