= Chad Harville =

American baseball player (born 1976)

- Pitcher
- Born: September 16, 1976; Selmer, Tennessee, U.S.
- Batted: Right Threw: Right

MLB debut
- June 23, 1999, for the Oakland Athletics

Last MLB appearance
- August 12, 2006, for the Tampa Bay Devil Rays

MLB statistics
- Win–loss record: 4–9
- Earned run average: 5.22
- Strikeouts: 147
- Stats at Baseball Reference

Former teams
- Oakland Athletics (1999, 2001, 2003–2004); Houston Astros (2004–2005); Boston Red Sox (2005); Tampa Bay Devil Rays (2006)

Chad Ashley Harville (born September 16, 1976) is an American former professional baseball relief pitcher. Harville batted and threw right-handed. He is known for throwing in the high 90's with an outstanding sinker.

== Career ==
A second-round pick of the Oakland Athletics in 1997, Harville posted a 4-6 record with a 4.94 ERA and one save in 135 career relief appearances with Oakland and Houston. In 133 innings, he had 114 strikeouts and 78 walks.

On August 23, 2005, Harville was claimed by the Boston Red Sox off waivers from the Astros. He was 0-2 with a 4.46 ERA in 37 games for Houston, having allowed just two runs in 15 1-3 innings over his last 13 appearances. With the Red Sox unable to find the right combination of relievers due to injury and ineffectiveness (using a total of 18 pitchers out of the bullpen), they decided to take a chance on Harville, designating Mike Remlinger for assignment. Unfortunately, Harville was 0-1 with a 6.43 ERA in 8 appearances for Boston.

On November 22, 2005, Harville was signed by the Tampa Bay Devil Rays as a free agent to a one-year deal, but he had another down season, posting a 0-2 record and a 5.93 ERA in 32 appearances. On August 15, 2006, the Devil Rays designated him for assignment. In 2007, Harville was the closer for the Arizona Diamondbacks Triple-A affiliate, the Tucson Sidewinders.

Harville is originally from Savannah, Tennessee. He attended Hardin County High School. In 1994, he was named All-Conference in C-USA while playing for the Memphis Tigers.

== Sources ==
- Career statistics from Baseball Reference · Retrosheet
- The ESPN Baseball Encyclopedia – Gary Gillette, Peter Gammons, Pete Palmer. Publisher: Sterling Publishing, 2005. Format: Paperback, 1824pp. Language: English. ISBN 1-4027-4771-3
