= Mike Gallo =

American baseball player (born 1977)

- Pitcher
- Born: April 2, 1977 (age 48); Long Beach, California, U.S.
- Batted: Left Threw: Left

MLB debut
- July 2, 2003, for the Houston Astros

Last MLB appearance
- May 31, 2006, for the Houston Astros

MLB statistics
- Win–loss record: 4–3
- Earned run average: 4.11
- Strikeouts: 69
- Stats at Baseball Reference

Teams
- Houston Astros (2003–2006)

Michael Dwain Gallo (born April 2, 1977) is an American former Major League Baseball pitcher.

== Biography ==
He debuted for the Houston Astros on July 2, 2003. Careerwise with the Astros, he was 4-3 with an ERA of 4.11. He attended Long Beach State.

In 2005, he was 0-1 with an ERA of 2.66 in 36 appearances. In the 2005 postseason, he pitched 5.1 innings and only gave up one run on 4 hits. He started 2006 with the Houston Astros, but was sent down to their Triple-A affiliate, the Round Rock Express, on June 2, 2006, after compiling a 1-2 record and a 6.06 ERA in 16.1 innings pitched.

In 2006, he was on the Italian baseball team in the World Baseball Classic. On December 18, 2006, he signed a minor league deal with the Colorado Rockies. In 2007, he spent the entire season in Triple-A with the Colorado Springs Sky Sox. In 56 relief appearances, he went 2-6 with a 5.10 ERA. During the 2007-08 off-season, Gallo signed a minor league contract with the Toronto Blue Jays, but was released on June 5.
