= Brandon Backe =

American baseball player (born 1978)

- Pitcher
- Born: April 5, 1978 (age 48); Galveston, Texas, U.S.
- Batted: Right Threw: Right

MLB debut
- July 19, 2002, for the Tampa Bay Devil Rays

Last MLB appearance
- June 18, 2009, for the Houston Astros

MLB statistics
- Win–loss record: 31–29
- Earned run average: 5.23
- Strikeouts: 360
- Stats at Baseball Reference

Teams
- Tampa Bay Devil Rays (2002–2003); Houston Astros (2004–2009)

Brandon Allen Backe (/ˈbæki/; born April 5, 1978) is an American former professional baseball pitcher. He played in Major League Baseball (MLB) for the Tampa Bay Devil Rays and Houston Astros during his career, and appeared in the 2005 World Series as a member of the Astros.

Originally a position player, Backe was drafted as a second baseman and played in the outfield in the minor leagues prior to converting to pitching.

== High school and college ==
Backe starred for Ball High School in Galveston, Texas where he was a two-time team MVP in baseball and earned all-district honors. He was selected by the Milwaukee Brewers in the 36th round of the 1996 Major League Baseball draft, but chose to stay close to home and played his collegiate baseball at Galveston College where he earned third-team All-America honors in 1998. Primarily an infielder, he pitched only 26 total innings for the Whitecaps. Other notable Whitecap players on Backe's team included Pete Orr and Seth Foreman.

== Minor leagues ==
Backe was selected by the Tampa Bay Devil Rays in the 18th round of the 1998 Major League Baseball draft. During his first three seasons in the minor leagues, he played every infield and outfield position. In fact, the two innings that he pitched for the rookie league Princeton Devil Rays in 1998 were the only time he spent on the mound during that time. In spite of his steady glove and versatility, it was clear that a light-hitting utility player had a very small chance of making the major leagues. In 2001, he changed positions to pitcher and found immediate success. He rose through the ranks of the pitching-depleted Tampa Bay system climbing from Single-A to the major leagues in just a season and a half.

== Major leagues ==
=== Tampa Bay ===
==== 2002 ====
In just his second season as a pitcher, Backe was recalled on July 16, 2002 from the Double-A Orlando Rays and pitched nine times for the Devil Rays. He posted a 6.92 ERA giving up 10 runs in 13 innings, however 7 of those runs came in one outing - the first game of a July 23 doubleheader at Fenway Park, a game the Rays lost 22-4 and in which Backe allowed a pair of home runs to Nomar Garciaparra in one inning.

==== 2003 ====
Backe began the season in the minor leagues, but was recalled on May 16 when John Rocker was optioned. He earned his first big league win on August 1 at Kansas City with four scoreless innings of relief. He had a 9-outing stretch from July 22 to August 21 in which he pitched to a 1.42 ERA over 19 innings, lowering his ERA from 6.06 to a season-low 3.60.

=== Houston ===
In December 2003, his hometown team, the Houston Astros, acquired Backe from the Devil Rays for Geoff Blum.

==== 2004 ====
In 2004, Backe shuffled between Triple-A and the majors, pitching out of the bullpen when he was with the Astros. On August 21, Backe was called up for his first major league start, where he ended up limiting the Chicago Cubs to four hits and no runs over seven innings. After that start, Backe became a permanent member of the Astros rotation, going 4–2 over the final two months of the season.

Entering their final regular-season game against the Colorado Rockies on October 3, the Astros needed a win to clinch a playoff spot. Although Roger Clemens was scheduled as the starting pitcher for that game, he was sidelined by a stomach virus, forcing manager Phil Garner to press Backe into starting duty the morning of the game. Backe performed well on his short notice, surrendering only 2 runs over 5 innings as the Astros beat the Rockies 5-3 and edged out the San Francisco Giants for the team's first playoff berth since 2001.

Backe's star continued to rise during the 2004 playoffs. After earning a win in Game 3 of the NL Division Series against the Atlanta Braves, Backe gained national attention with an eight-inning, one-hit performance against the St. Louis Cardinals in Game 5 of the NL Championship Series. Going toe-to-toe with Cardinals starter and Houston native Woody Williams, Backe carried a perfect game into the 5th inning and a no-hitter into the 6th inning, surrendering only a bloop single to St. Louis second baseman Tony Womack. Backe's pitching performance set the stage for Jeff Kent's walk-off home run in the ninth inning, giving the Astros a 3–2 series advantage headed back to St. Louis, however the Astros lost both subsequent games and the series.

==== 2005 ====
Backe started the 2005 season in the Astros starting rotation, going 10–8 with a 4.76 ERA in his first full season as a starter. Backe performed well in the Astros second-consecutive postseason appearance, including a five-hit, seven-strikeout performance in Game 4 of the 2005 World Series.

==== 2006 ====
In the 2006 season, Backe was the Astros No. 4 starter. But after two starts he went onto the disabled list for three months. He returned in late July, but on August 19 he sprained a ligament in his right elbow was placed on the disabled list again. This injury required Tommy John surgery, which was successfully performed on September 7, 2006.

==== 2007 ====
Although Backe's recovery time was slated at 12–18 months, he rehabbed aggressively and made his return on September 4. In his return, he gave up 4 runs (3 earned) in 5.2 innings, taking the loss, but won his last 4 starts of the season for an ERA of 3.77.

==== 2008 ====
During the 2008 season, Backe was totally healthy and made 31 starts for the Astros, although it turned out to be a disappointing year for him, as he went just 9–14 with a 6.05 ERA. He led the majors in home runs allowed, with 36, in home-runs-per-9 innings (with 1.9), in home runs per plate appearance (with 4.8%), and in highest-slugging-percentage-against (.544) and OPS-against (.920).

On October 5, 2008, Backe was arrested, along with nine others, after being involved in a fight at a wedding. He was charged with interfering with a police officer and resisting arrest, but a grand jury declined to indict him. On October 18, 2008, it was reported that Backe's attorney filed a complaint with the FBI, claiming that Backe's and the other arrested citizens' civil rights had been violated by the officers. In 2014, in a federal lawsuit that he and others who were injured at the wedding brought against several Galveston, Texas police officers, Backe testified that he heard a cry referring to Cole O'Balle, the brother of the bride:

Backe said he ran to the sound and encountered O'Balle face down on the ground and surrounded by police, his face bloody and the prongs from a stun gun stuck in his back. O'Balle was flown by helicopter to a Houston hospital.

Backe said officer Nicholas McDermott "screamed, 'back the f--- up." Backe said he could back up no farther and told the officer, "Chill out, we can't back up. You've got enough room." At that point several officers attacked him, he said, striking him as he fell to the ground and continuing to beat him until his face was bloody. One kicked him in the face, he said.

When he fell, his shoulder struck a concrete curb that separated the sidewalk from a garden. He said officers kept beating him while he was down. "I hit the ground hard and they just got on top of me," he said. Backe contends that this is when his shoulder was so badly damaged it ended his career.

==== 2009 ====
Backe was designated for assignment on June 26, 2009. Backe had an ERA of over 10 for the Astros in 2009, including 7 relief appearances and one start. The young Felipe Paulino replaced him on the roster as he was recovering from an injury. On June 29, 2009, Backe was released by the Astros.

== See also ==
- List of World Series starting pitchers
