= Raúl Chávez =

Venezuelan baseball player (born 1973)

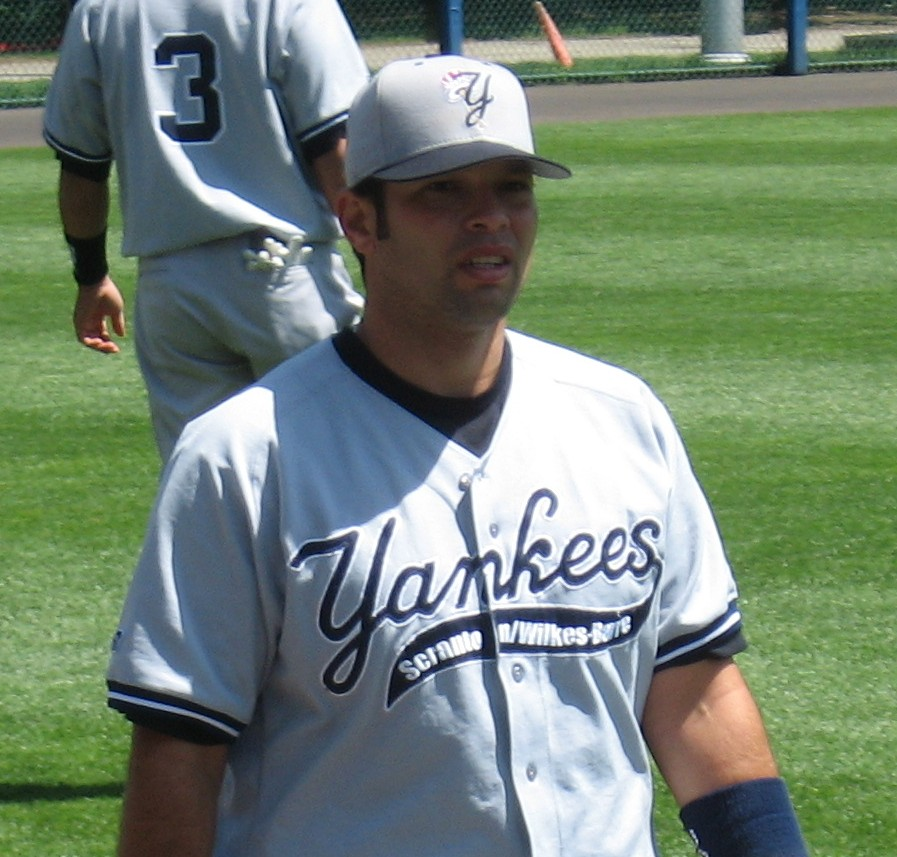
- Chávez with the Scranton Wilkes-Barre Yankees
- Catcher
- Born: March 18, 1973 (age 53); Valencia, Carabobo, Venezuela
- Batted: Right Threw: Right

MLB debut
- August 30, 1996, for the Montreal Expos

Last MLB appearance
- September 24, 2009, for the Toronto Blue Jays

MLB statistics
- Batting average: .231
- Home runs: 7
- Runs batted in: 65
- Stats at Baseball Reference

Teams
- Montreal Expos (1996–1997); Seattle Mariners (1998); Houston Astros (2000, 2002–2005); Baltimore Orioles (2006); Pittsburgh Pirates (2008); Toronto Blue Jays (2009)

Raúl Alexander Chávez (born March 18, 1973) is a Venezuelan former professional baseball catcher. He played in Major League Baseball (MLB) from 1996 to 2009 for the Montreal Expos, Seattle Mariners, Houston Astros, Baltimore Orioles, Pittsburgh Pirates, and Toronto Blue Jays. He bats and throws right-handed.

== Career ==
Chávez played for the Montreal Expos (1996–1997), Seattle Mariners (1998), Houston Astros (2000, 2002–2005), Baltimore Orioles (2006), Pittsburgh Pirates (2008), and Toronto Blue Jays (2009). He also played in the New York Yankees minor league system in 2007.

=== Pittsburgh Pirates ===
In 2008, he played for the Pittsburgh Pirates. He declined a minor league assignment on December 10, 2008, becoming a free agent.

=== Toronto Blue Jays ===
On December 22, he signed a minor league contract with an invitation to spring training with the Toronto Blue Jays. He did not make the 25-man Jays' roster out of spring training, and was assigned to Triple A Las Vegas 51s. But an injury to Michael Barrett on April 17 sent Barrett to the disabled list, and Chavez was called up to the Blue Jays the next day to fill the roster spot. He made his 2009 debut catching Ricky Romero at Rogers Centre in Toronto on April 19, in a 1–0 win over the Oakland Athletics.

Chávez is known for his defense, specifically his exceptional arm, and is considered to call a solid game. On June 6, 2009, Chavez hit his first home run for the Toronto Blue Jays, giving them a 2–0 lead over the Kansas City Royals. On December 11, 2009, the Blue Jays declined to tender Chavez a contract, however two days later they signed him to a minor league contract with an invitation to spring training.

=== New York Mets ===
On January 14, 2011, the New York Mets signed Chávez to a minor league deal with an invitation to spring training. He spent the season with the Buffalo Bisons before retiring.

== See also ==
- List of Major League Baseball players from Venezuela
