= Mike Lamb =

American baseball player (born 1975)

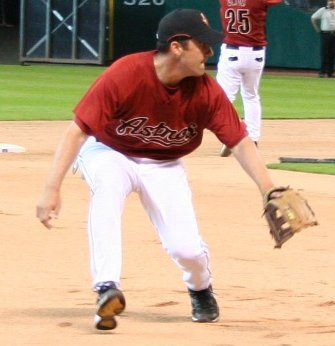
- Lamb with the Houston Astros
- Third baseman / First baseman
- Born: August 9, 1975 (age 50); West Covina, California, U.S.
- Batted: Left Threw: Right

MLB debut
- April 23, 2000, for the Texas Rangers

Last MLB appearance
- July 17, 2010, for the Florida Marlins

MLB statistics
- Batting average: .276
- Home runs: 69
- Runs batted in: 349
- Stats at Baseball Reference

Teams
- Texas Rangers (2000–2003); Houston Astros (2004–2007); Minnesota Twins (2008); Milwaukee Brewers (2008); Florida Marlins (2010)

Michael Robert Lamb (born August 9, 1975) is an American former professional baseball third baseman and first baseman. He played in Major League Baseball (MLB) for the Texas Rangers, Houston Astros, Minnesota Twins, Milwaukee Brewers, Florida Marlins from 2000 through 2008, and 2010. As a player, Lamb was listed at 6 feet 1 inch (1.85 m) and 205 pounds (93 kg).

== Career ==
=== Texas Rangers ===
Lamb attended Bishop Amat High School in La Puente, California and California State University, Fullerton. He was drafted by the Texas Rangers in the seventh round of the 1997 Major League Baseball draft. Lamb made his Major League debut on April 23, 2000 against the Minnesota Twins, going 1-for-4. He collected his first major league hit with a third-inning single off Twins pitcher Brad Radke. He played for the Rangers until February 5, 2004, when he was traded to the New York Yankees for minor leaguer Jose Garcia.

=== Houston Astros ===
Before playing a game for the Yankees, the Houston Astros acquired Lamb from the Yankees for minor leaguer Juan DeLeon on March 25, 2004. In 2005, Lamb saw more playing time due to regular first baseman Jeff Bagwell's injury. In 2005, he batted .236 with 12 home runs and 53 RBI, with one stolen base in 125 games. He participated in the 2005 World Series where he hit the first World Series home run in Astros history, becoming only the second player whose last name is a type of animal to homer in the World Series (the first was Tim Salmon in 2002).

=== Minnesota Twins ===
On December 14, 2007, Lamb signed a two-year, $6.6 million deal with the Minnesota Twins that included a club option for 2010. On August 25, 2008, he was designated for assignment to make room on the roster for Eddie Guardado. At the time, he was batting .233 with a home run and 32 RBI in 81 games. Lamb was released on September 4.

=== Milwaukee Brewers ===
One day after his release from the Twins, Lamb signed with the Milwaukee Brewers. He appeared in 11 games off the bench for Milwaukee, batting .273. Lamb became a free agent at the end of the 2008 season. On December 9, however, he re-signed a new contract with the Brewers. On April 1, 2009, after turning down a Triple-A assignment, Lamb was released by the Brewers.

=== New York Mets ===
On April 25, 2009, the New York Mets signed Lamb to a minor league contract. He spent the entire 2009 season with the Triple-A Buffalo Bisons, batting .264 with five home runs and 53 RBI in 119 games. He became a free agent after the season.

=== Florida Marlins ===
On February 11, 2010, Lamb signed a minor league contract with the Florida Marlins, and was added to the Major League roster on April 3. On May 6, 2010, Lamb was designated for assignment, and later cleared waivers before being sent to the Triple-A New Orleans Zephyrs on May 12. He was recalled to replace fourth outfielder Cameron Maybin on June 18.

=== Late career ===
Lamb signed a minor league contract with the New York Yankees on June 22, 2011, after beginning the season with the Camden Riversharks of Atlantic League. In 45 games with the Riversharks he hit .320/.418/.515 with 7 home runs, 32 RBIs and 3 stolen bases.

He was assigned to the Triple-A Scranton/Wilkes-Barre Yankees.

Preceded by Corey Koskie	Topps Rookie All-Star Third Baseman; 2000	Succeeded by Albert Pujols
