= 2005 Washington Nationals season =

2005 Washington Nationals
- League: National League
- Division: East
- Ballpark: Robert F. Kennedy Memorial Stadium
- City: Washington, D.C.
- Record: 81–81 (.500)
- Divisional place: 5th
- Owners: Major League Baseball
- General managers: Jim Bowden
- Managers: Frank Robinson
- Television: MASN; WDCA (UPN 20); WTTG (Fox 5) (Mel Proctor, Ron Darling, Kenny Albert)
- Radio: WFED; WWZZ (Charlie Slowes, Dave Shea)

The 2005 Washington Nationals season was the first for the team formerly known as the Montreal Expos since moving to Washington, D.C., and 37th overall for the franchise. The team signed four key free agents during the off-season: Vinny Castilla, José Guillén, Cristian Guzmán and Esteban Loaiza. Although they recorded an 81–81 record, the Nationals nevertheless finished last for a second consecutive year although they were only nine games behind the National League East champion Atlanta Braves.

== Offseason ==
- On November 9, 2004, the Nationals traded Maicer Izturis and Juan Rivera to the Los Angeles Angels of Anaheim for José Guillén.
- On November 24, 2004, the Nationals traded minor leaguer Antonio Sucre to the Pittsburgh Pirates for J. J. Davis.
- On January 19, 2005, they signed Esteban Loaiza as a free agent.
- On February 8, 2005, they agreed to terms with Mike Shuster via a walk on.
- On February 9, 2005, they signed Melvin Nieves, also as a free agent.
- On February 13, 2005, the Nationals traded minor leaguer Jerry Owens to the Chicago White Sox for Alex Escobar.
- On February 15, 2005, they traded Alejandro Machado to the Boston Red Sox for a player to be named later; the Red Sox sent minor-leaguer Carlos Torres to the Nationals on March 28, 2005, to complete the trade.
- On March 22, 2005, the Nationals traded minor leaguer A. J. Wideman to the Toronto Blue Jays for Tyrell Godwin
- On March 24, 2005, they traded Seth Greisinger to the Atlanta Braves as part of a conditional deal.

== Spring training ==
The Nationals held their 2005 spring training in Viera, Florida, with home games played at Space Coast Stadium.

== Advertising and marketing ==
The Nationals' marketing slogan for the season was "Let Yourself Go." Nationals Vice President of Sales and Marketing David Cope explained that the slogan told "people to come to the game, to let themselves come out here [to Robert F. Kennedy Memorial Stadium]. But then once you're here, have fun, let loose. We don't want it to feel like stuffy old D.C.—and it doesn't."

== Mascot ==
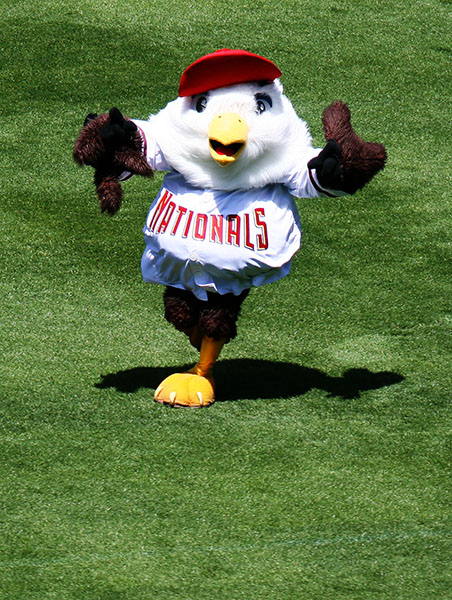
Screech, the Washington Nationals' bald eagle mascot, as he appeared from 2005 through 2008. A much slimmer version of Screech debuted just before the beginning of the 2009 season.

Screech, the mascot of the Washington Nationals, made his debut near the beginning of the 2005 season. A bald eagle who wears the home cap and jersey of the team, he was "hatched" on April 17, 2005, at the "Kids Opening Day" promotion at Robert F. Kennedy Memorial Stadium during the third home game in Nationals history, a game against the Arizona Diamondbacks. A nine-year-old fourth-grade student in Washington, Glenda Gutierrez, designed the mascot and won a contest sponsored by the team, explaining that Screech was "strong and eats almost everything." The first, chubby version of Screech appeared during the team's first four seasons in Washington; just before the start of the 2009 season, the Nationals replaced him with a thin version who debuted in March 2009, explaining that Screech had "grown up" and become a "teenager."

== Broadcast media difficulties ==
The Nationals' broadcasting deal for 2005 was put together at the last minute and led to difficulties for fans attempting to follow the team on radio or television. Its two flagship radio stations – FM-104.1 WWZZ in Waldorf, Maryland, and AM-1050 WFED in Silver Spring, Maryland – had weak signals and were not audible in many of Washington's suburbs. On television, the Nationals′ network, the new Mid-Atlantic Sports Network (MASN), was carried on DirecTv, RCN Cable, and Verizon′s fiberoptic service and WTTG Channel 5 and WDCA Channel 20 broadcast 79 games, but the Washington area's dominant cable television provider, Comcast, refused to carry MASN during the season because of an ongoing legal battle with MASN over broadcast rights to Baltimore Orioles games. The limitation of radio and television coverage forced many Nationals fans to rely on print media and in-person attendance at games to follow the team during 2005.

== Regular season ==
The Nationals had a terrific first half, as they had a 51–32 record by July 5 and were leading the Atlanta Braves by 4.5 games. However, the team struggled in its final 79 games, going 30-49 and scoring only 299 runs (3.78 per game). They were also shut out 7 times during that span. Nevertheless, the team was able to finish the season at .500; this was only the fourth time in 10 years that the franchise had finished at or above .500.

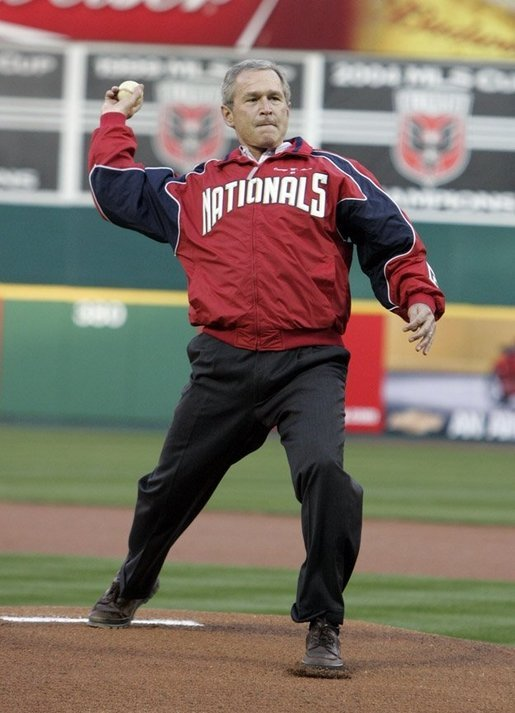
President George W. Bush throws out a ceremonial first pitch in 2005.

=== Highlights ===
- The Washington Nationals first regular season game was on April 4, 2005 against the Philadelphia Phillies at Citizens Bank Park in Philadelphia. The Nationals' Brad Wilkerson, the last player to ever wear a Montreal Expo jersey for the Expos, (Note: On July 6, 2019, the Nationals wore 1969 Montreal Expo throwback uniforms for a game against the Kansas City Royals.) had the honor of being the first batter for the Washington Nationals and he promptly responded with the first hit in the new team's history. But Kenny Lofton hit a three-run homer and Jon Lieber pitched 5 2/3 effective innings, leading the Phillies to an 8–4 victory over the new Nationals at Citizens Bank Park. (Lieber was credited with the win for the Phillies and would also score a win for Philadelphia in the last game of the 2005 Nationals season.) Outfielder Terrmel Sledge hit the Nats' first home run in the April 4 contest.
- Scorecard: April 4, Citizens Bank Park, Philadelphia

Team	1	2	3	4	5	6	7	8	9	R	H	E
Washington	0	1	0	0	0	2	1	0	0	4	13	1
Philadelphia	0	2	1	0	4	0	1	0	x	8	14	1
W: Lieber (1-0) L: Hernandez (0-1)
HRs: Terrmel Sledge, Kenny Lofton Attendance: 44,080. Length of game: 3:19. Umpires: HP: Darling, 1B: Poncino, 2B: Wegner, 3B: Nauert

- On April 6, 2005, the Washington Nationals recorded their first-ever regular season win by beating the Phillies, 7–3. The win came in their second game of the season and was highlighted by Wilkerson's hit for the cycle.
- On April 14, 2005, the Washington Nationals won their first regular season home game at RFK Stadium in Washington, D.C., by a score of 5–3 against the Arizona Diamondbacks. President George W. Bush kept up a tradition of sitting U.S. Presidents by throwing out the ceremonial first pitch on opening day in Washington, exactly 95 years after William Howard Taft started the tradition at Griffith Stadium in 1910. There were 45,596 fans in attendance, including former Senators players and Baseball Commissioner Bud Selig. Liván Hernández threw eight shutout innings, and Vinny Castilla was denied the chance to hit for the cycle when Diamondback reliever Lance Cormier hit him with a pitch in the bottom of the eighth; Castilla needed only a single to complete the cycle. Chad Cordero recorded the save for Washington.
- On August 4, 2005, Brad Wilkerson became the first Washington Nationals player to ever hit a grand slam, against then Los Angeles Dodgers relief pitcher, Duaner Sánchez. The Nationals won the game 7–0, on a four-hit complete-game shutout by John Patterson.
- In their 8–0 victory over the Colorado Rockies on August 13, the Nationals allowed 19 baserunners without giving up a run, an MLB record for a 9-inning game.
- During his August–September callup, Ryan Zimmerman recorded 23 hits in 58 at bats. He thus became the first member of the Washington Nationals to complete the season with a batting average of at least .300 in at least 50 at bats.
- The Nationals led all National League teams in interleague play in 2005, recording 12 wins.
- Despite getting swept by the Phillies in their final three games, the Nationals finished the season at 81-81 (.500), making the first time in baseball history an entire division finished the season having won at least as many games as they lost.

=== Season standings ===
==== National League East ====
NL East
Team	W	L	Pct.	GB	Home	Road
Atlanta Braves	90	72	.556	—	53‍–‍28	37‍–‍44
Philadelphia Phillies	88	74	.543	2	46‍–‍35	42‍–‍39
Florida Marlins	83	79	.512	7	45‍–‍36	38‍–‍43
New York Mets	83	79	.512	7	48‍–‍33	35‍–‍46
Washington Nationals	81	81	.500	9	41‍–‍40	40‍–‍41

==== Record vs. opponents ====
2005 National League record Source: MLB Standings Grid – 2005
Team	AZ	ATL	CHC	CIN	COL	FLA	HOU	LAD	MIL	NYM	PHI	PIT	SD	SF	STL	WAS	AL
Arizona	—	3–3	5–2	2–4	11–7	2–4	3–3	13–5	2–4	1–6	3–4	3–4	10–9	7–11	2–5	2–4	8–10
Atlanta	3–3	—	6–1	7–3	2–4	10–8	5–1	3–3	3–3	13–6	9–10	4–3	1–5	4–2	3–3	10–9	7–8
Chicago	2–5	1–6	—	6–9	4–3	5–4	9–7	4–2	7–9	2–4	2–4	11–5	4–3	5–2	10–6	1–5	6–9
Cincinnati	4–2	3–7	9–6	—	3–3	2–4	4–12	3–4	6–10	3–3	3–4	9–7	4–2	3–5	5–11	5–1	7-8
Colorado	7–11	4–2	3–4	3–3	—	3–3	1–5	11–8	1–5	3–4	2–4	3–7	7–11	7–11	4–4	2–4	6–9
Florida	4–2	8–10	4–5	4–2	3–3	—	4–3	5–2	3–4	8–10	9–10	3–4	2–4	4–2	3–4	9–9	10–5
Houston	3–3	1–5	7–9	12–4	5–1	3-4	—	4–2	10–5	5–5	6–0	9–7	4–3	3–4	5–11	5–2	7–8
Los Angeles	5–13	3–3	2–4	4–3	8–11	2–5	2–4	—	5–1	3–3	3–3	5–2	11–7	9–10	2–5	2–4	5–13
Milwaukee	4–2	3–3	9–7	10–6	5–1	4–3	5–10	1–5	—	3–3	4–5	9–7	3–4	4–3	5–11	4–4	8–7
New York	6–1	6–13	4–2	3–3	4–3	10–8	5–5	3–3	3–3	—	11–7	3–3	4–2	3–3	2–5	11–8	5–10
Philadelphia	4-3	10–9	4–2	4–3	4–2	10–9	0–6	3–3	5–4	7–11	—	4–3	6–0	5–1	4–2	11–8	7–8
Pittsburgh	4–3	3–4	5–11	7–9	7–3	4–3	7–9	2–5	7–9	3–3	3–4	—	3–4	2–4	4–12	1–5	5–7
San Diego	9–10	5–1	3–4	2–4	11–7	4–2	3–4	7–11	4–3	2–4	0–6	4–3	—	12–6	4–3	5–1	7–11
San Francisco	11–7	2–4	2–5	5–3	11–7	2–4	4–3	10–9	3–4	3–3	1–5	4–2	6–12	—	2–4	3–3	6–12
St. Louis	5–2	3–3	6–10	11–5	4–4	4-3	11–5	5–2	11–5	5–2	2–4	12–4	3–4	4–2	—	4–2	10–5
Washington	4–2	9–10	5–1	1–5	4–2	9-9	2–5	4–2	4–4	8–11	8–11	5–1	1–5	3–3	2–4	—	12–6

Nationals vs. American League
Team	AL West				
Team	LAA	OAK	SEA	TEX	TOR
Washington	2–1	3–0	3–0	1–2	3–3

=== Opening Day lineup ===
Opening Day Starters
Name	Position
Brad Wilkerson	Center fielder
Cristian Guzmán	Shortstop
José Vidro	Second baseman
José Guillén	Right fielder
Nick Johnson	First baseman
Vinny Castilla	Third baseman
Termel Sledge	Left fielder
Brian Schneider	Catcher
Liván Hernández	Starting pitcher

=== Notable transactions ===
- May 14, 2005: The Nationals traded Endy Chávez to the Philadelphia Phillies for Marlon Byrd.
- May 31, 2005: The Nationals released Melvin Nieves.
- June 10, 2005: The Nationals traded Tomo Ohka to the Milwaukee Brewers for Junior Spivey.
- July 13, 2005: The Nationals signed Mike Stanton as a free agent and traded J. J. Davis, Zach Day, and cash to the Colorado Rockies for Preston Wilson.
- July 20, 2005: The Nationals selected Kenny Kely off waivers from the Cincinnati Reds.
- August 6, 2005: The Nationals sent Steve Randolph to the San Francisco Giants as part of a conditional deal.
- August 30, 2005: The Nationals traded minor leaguer Ben Cox to the San Francisco Giants for Deivi Cruz.
- September 29, 2005: The Nationals traded Mike Stanton to the Boston Red Sox for minor-leaguers Rhys Taylor and Yader Peralta.

=== Draft ===
The 2005 Major League Baseball draft took place on June 7 and 8. With their first pick – the fourth pick overall – the Nationals selected third baseman Ryan Zimmerman, who would advance through the minor leagues quickly and join the Nationals in September. Other notable players the Nationals selected were outfielder Justin Maxwell (fourth round, 114th overall), pitcher Marco Estrada (sixth round, 174th overall), pitcher John Lannan (11th round, 324th overall), pitcher Craig Stammen (12th round, 354th overall), pitcher Ryan Buchter (33rd round, 984th overall), first baseman Tyler Moore (41st round, 1,222nd overall), and pitcher Scott Barnes (43rd round, 1,280th overall). Moore and Barnes did not sign with the team.

=== Roster ===
2005 Washington Nationals
Roster
Pitchers: 36 Tony Armas Jr.; 56 Luis Ayala; 57 Jason Bergmann; 48 Héctor Carrasco; 32 Chad Cordero; 40 Zach Day; 45 Ryan Drese; 58 Joey Eischen; 54 John Halama; 61 Liván Hernández; 39 Joe Horgan; 34 Travis Hughes; 31 Sun Woo Kim; 21 Esteban Loaiza; 38 Gary Majewski; 47 C. J. Nitkowski; 34 Tomo Ohka; 13 Antonio Osuna; 22 John Patterson; 31 Darrell Rasner; 51 Jon Rauch; 30 Mike Stanton; 52 T. J. Tucker; 45 Claudio Vargas; 47 Matt White	Catchers: 29 Gary Bennett; 55 Keith Osik; 23 Brian Schneider; Infielders: 5 Carlos Baerga; 2 Jamey Carroll; 9 Vinny Castilla; 25 Wil Cordero; 4 Deivi Cruz; 15 Cristian Guzmán; 54 Brendan Harris; 24 Nick Johnson; 4 Henry Mateo; 35 Rick Short; 11 Junior Spivey; 3 José Vidro; 25 Ryan Zimmerman	Outfielders: 28 Tony Blanco; 26 Marlon Byrd; 47 Matt Cepicky; 47 Endy Chávez; 19 Ryan Church; 26 J. J. Davis; 6 José Guillén; 11 Jeffrey Hammonds; 39 Kenny Kelly; 18 Terrmel Sledge; 00 Brandon Watson; 7 Brad Wilkerson; 44 Preston Wilson; Other batters: 1 Tyrell Godwin	Manager: 20 Frank Robinson; Coaches: 12 Don Buford (First Base); 37 Dave Huppert (Third Base); 17 Tommy McCraw (Hitting); 60 Bob Natal (Bullpen); 14 Eddie Rodríguez (Bench); 49 Randy St. Claire (Pitching); 33 Jack Voigt (Assistant)

=== Attendance ===
The Nationals drew 2,731,993 fans at Robert F. Kennedy Memorial Stadium in 2005, placing them eighth in attendance for the season among the 16 National League teams.

=== Game log ===
Game log
April (13-11)

#	Date	Opponent	Score	Win	Loss	Save	Attendance	Record
1	April 4	@ Philadelphia Phillies	4-8	Lieber (1-0)	Hernández (0-1)		44,080	0-1
2	April 6	@ Philadelphia Phillies	7-3	Eischen (1-0)	Worrell (0-1)		23,435	1-1
3	April 7	@ Philadelphia Phillies	5-4 (10)	Cordero (1-0)	Cormier (0-1)		21,693	2-1
4	April 8	@ Florida Marlins	0-9	Willis (1-0)	Ohka (0-1)		19,327	2-2
5	April 9	@ Florida Marlins	3-2 (10)	Cordero (2-0)	Alfonseca (0-1)		30,739	3-2
6	April 10	@ Florida Marlins	0-8	Beckett (2-0)	Patterson (0-1)		25,089	3-3
7	April 11	@ Atlanta Braves	2-11	Hampton (1-0)	Day (0-1)		16,584	3-4
8	April 12	@ Atlanta Braves	4-3	Ayala (1-0)	Kolb (0-1)	Cordero (1)	20,122	4-4
9	April 13	@ Atlanta Braves	11-4	Ohka (1-1)	Thomson (1-1)		19,093	5-4
10	April 14	Arizona Diamondbacks	5-3	Hernández (1-1)	Vázquez (0-2)	Cordero (2)	45,596	6-4
11	April 16	Arizona Diamondbacks	9-3	Patterson (1-1)	Ortiz (1-1)		34,943	7-4
12	April 17	Arizona Diamondbacks	7-3	Tucker (1-0)	Koplove (1-1)		35,463	8-4
13	April 18	Florida Marlins	4-9	Willis (3-0)	Ohka (1-2)		24,003	8-5
14	April 19	Florida Marlins	3-6	Moehler (1-0)	Hernández (1-2)		25,990	8-6
15	April 20	Atlanta Braves	2-0	Day (1-1)	Ramírez (1-1)	Cordero (3)	27,374	9-6
16	April 21	Atlanta Braves	1-2	Reitsma (1-0)	Cordero (2-1)	Kolb (5)	30,728	9-7
17	April 22	@ New York Mets	1-3	Glavine (1-2)	Loaiza (0-1)	Looper (2)	28,488	9-8
18	April 23	@ New York Mets	5-10	Seo (1-0)	Ohka (1-3)		44,058	9-9
19	April 24	@ New York Mets	11-4	Hernández (2-2)	Zambrano (1-2)		43,313	10-9
20	April 25	Philadelphia Phillies	4-5	Lidle (1-2)	Day (1-2)	Wagner (4)	24,956	10-10
21	April 26	Philadelphia Phillies	3-1	Patterson (2-1)	Lieber(4-1)	Cordero (4)	23,332	11-10
22	April 27	Philadelphia Phillies	0-3	Cormier (1-1)	Loaiza (0-2)	Wagner (5)	27,483	11-11
23	April 29	New York Mets	5-1	Hernández (3-2)	Seo (1-1)	Cordero (5)	30,627	12-11
24	April 30	New York Mets	5-3	Ohka (2-3)	Zambrano (1-3)	Carrasco (1)	40,913	13-11

May (14-14)

#	Date	Opponent	Score	Win	Loss	Save	Attendance	Record
25	May 1	New York Mets	3-6	Hernández (2-0)	Ayala (1-1)	Looper (4)	27,333	13-12
26	May 2	@ Los Angeles Dodgers	6-2	Loaiza (1-2)	Erickson (1-3)		34,079	14-12
27	May 3	@ Los Angeles Dodgers	2-4	Weaver (3-2)	Rauch (0-1)	Brazobán (9)	41,190	14-13
28	May 4	@ Los Angeles Dodgers	5-2	Hernández (4-2)	Pérez (4-2)		33,081	15-13
29	May 6	@ San Francisco Giants	9-3	Rauch (1-1)	Lowry (1-3)		40,425	16-13
30	May 7	@ San Francisco Giants	11-8	Ayala (2-1)	Accardo (0-1)	Cordero (6)	40,220	17-13
31	May 8	@ San Francisco Giants	3-4 (13)	Christiansen (2-0)	Rauch (1-2)		36,903	17-14
32	May 9	@ Arizona Diamondbacks	4-3	Hernández (5-2)	Valverde (0-1)	Cordero (7)	19,440	18-14
33	May 10	@ Arizona Diamondbacks	2-3	Estes (3-3)	Armas (0-1)	Lyon (12)	23,181	18-15
34	May 11	@ Arizona Diamondbacks	2-3	Cormier (2-0)	Rauch (1-3)	Lyon (13)	21,011	18-16
35	May 13	Chicago Cubs	3-6	Ohman (1-0)	Ayala (2-2)	Wellemeyer (1)	36,585	18-17
36	May 14	Chicago Cubs	4-3	Hernández (6-2)	Zambrano (3-2)	Cordero (8)	42,829	19-17
37	May 15	Chicago Cubs	5-4	Carrasco(1-0)	Bartosh (0-2)	Cordero (9)	44,103	20-17
38	May 16	Milwaukee Brewers	5-2	Armas (1-1)	Davis (4-5)	Ayala (1)	26,606	21-17
39	May 17	Milwaukee Brewers	2-8	Obermueller (1-0)	Vargas (0-1)		26,427	21-18
40	May 18	Milwaukee Brewers	1-0	Majewski (1-0)	Capuano (3-3)		29,216	22-18
41	May 19	Milwaukee Brewers	3-2	Hernández (7-2)	Santos (1-4)	Cordero (10)	30,968	23-18
42	May 20	Toronto Blue Jays	1-6	Lilly (2-4)	Vargas (0-2)	Walker (1)	17,465	23-19
43	May 21	Toronto Blue Jays	0-7	Halladay (7-2)	Armas (1-2)		24,518	23-20
44	May 22	Toronto Blue Jays	9-2	Ohka (3-3)	Towers (5-2)		28,408	24-20
45	May 23	@ Cincinnati Reds	3-5	Milton (3-5)	Loaiza (1-3)	Weathers (1)	17,630	24-21
46	May 24	@ Cincinnati Reds	3-4 (15)	Keisler (1-0)	Ayala (2-3)		36,539	24-22
47	May 25	@ Cincinnati Reds	3-12	Belisle (2-4)	Vargass (0-3)		20,497	24-23
48	May 27	@ St. Louis Cardinals	3-6	Morris (5-0)	Armas (1-3)	Isringhausen (13)	47,383	24-24
49	May 28	@ St. Louis Cardinals	1-3	Suppan (4-5)	Loaiza (1-4)	Isringhausen (14)	49,123	24-25
50	May 29	@ St. Louis Cardinals	3-2	Hernández (8-2)	Carpenter (7-3)	Cordero (11)	47,012	25-25
51	May 30	Atlanta Braves	3-2	Ohka (4-3)	Davies (2-1)	Cordero (12)	39,705	26-25
52	May 31	Atlanta Braves	5-4	Ayala (3-3)	Colón (0-2)	Cordero (13)	29,512	27-25

June (20-6)

#	Date	Opponent	Score	Win	Loss	Save	Attendance	Record
53	June 1	Atlanta Braves	4-5	Smoltz (4-2)	Carrasco (1-1)	Reitsma (2)	28,280	27-26
54	June 2	Atlanta Braves	8-6	Carrasco (2-1)	Kolb (1-5)	Cordero (14)	29,225	28-26
55	June 3	Florida Marlins	3-2 (11)	Ayala (4-3)	Bump (0-3)		29,439	29-26
56	June 4	Florida Marlins	7-3	Kim (1-0)	Leiter (2-6)		33,198	30-26
57	June 5	Florida Marlins	6-3	Ayala (5-3)	Riedling (2-1)	Cordero (15)	40,995	31-26
58	June 7	Oakland Athletics	2-1	Armas (2-3)	Zito (2-7)	Cordero (16)	26,879	32-26
59	June 8	Oakland Athletics	7-2	Loaiza (2-4)	Glynn (0-2)		28,749	33-26
60	June 9	Oakland Athletics	4-3	Hernández (9-2)	Blanton (1-6)	Cordero (17)	26,672	34-26
61	June 10	Seattle Mariners	9-3	Ayala (6-3)	Hasegawa (1-2)		28,707	35-26
62	June 11	Seattle Mariners	2-1	Patterson (3-1)	Putz (1-2)	Cordero (18)	39,108	36-26
63	June 12	Seattle Mariners	3-2	Armas (3-3)	Franklin (2-8)	Cordero (19)	37,170	37-26
64	June 13	@ Los Angeles Angels of Anaheim	1-11	Byrd (6-5)	Loaiza (2-5)		40,790	37-27
65	June 14	@ Los Angeles Angels of Anaheim	6-3	Majewski (2-0)	Shields (5-4)	Cordero (20)	43,874	38-27
66	June 15	@ Los Angeles Angels of Anaheim	1-0	Drese (5-6)	Colón (8-4)	Cordero (21)	43,505	39-27
67	June 17	@ Texas Rangers	1-8	Rogers (9-2)	Patterson (3-2)		33,653	39-28
68	June 18	@ Texas Rangers	4-7	Rodríguez (2-0)	Armas (3-4)		48,663	39-29
69	June 19	@ Texas Rangers	8-2	Hughes (1-0)	Wilson (0-1)		34,474	40-29
70	June 20	@ Pittsburgh Pirates	7-4	Hernández (10-2)	Redman (4-5)	Cordero (22)	21,893	41-29
71	June 21	@ Pittsburgh Pirates	4-11	Pérez (6-5)	Drese (5-7)		26,006	41-30
72	June 22	@ Pittsburgh Pirates	5-4	Carrasco (3-1)	Gonzalez (0-3)	Cordero (23)	24,064	42-30
73	June 24	Toronto Blue Jays	3-0	Loaiza (3-5)	Towers (5-7)	Cordero (24)	36,689	43-30
74	June 25	Toronto Blue Jays	5-2	Hernández (11-2)	Lilly (5-8)	Cordero (25)	39,881	44-30
75	June 26	Toronto Blue Jays	5-9	Speier (1-1)	Ayala (6-4)	Batista (14)	33,557	44-31
76	June 28	Pittsburgh Pirates	2-1	Drese (6-7)	Fogg (4-4)	Cordero (26)	35,828	45-31
77	June 29	Pittsburgh Pirates	3-2	Ayala (7-4)	Torres (2-3)	Cordero (27)	31,213	46-31
78	June 30	Pittsburgh Pirates	7-5	Loaiza (4-5)	Wells (5-8)	Cordero (28)	37,361	47-31

July (9-18)

#	Date	Opponent	Score	Win	Loss	Save	Attendance	Record
79	July 1	@ Chicago Cubs	4-3	Hernández (12-2)	Prior (5-2)	Carrasco (2)	38,973	48-31
80	July 2	@ Chicago Cubs	4-2	Armas (4-4)	Williams (1-3)	Cordero (29)	40,488	49-31
81	July 3	@ Chicago Cubs	5-4 (12)	Eischen (2-0)	Mitre (2-4)		40,006	50-31
82	July 4	New York Mets	2-5	Hernández (4-2)	Kim (1-1)	Looper (18)	44,331	50-32
83	July 5	New York Mets	3-2	Loaiza (5-5)	Martínez (9-3)	Cordero (30)	35,087	51-32
84	July 6	New York Mets	3-5	Glavine (6-7)	Hernández (12-3)	Looper (19)	38,148	51-33
85	July 7	New York Mets	2-3 (11)	Bell (1-3)	Ayala (7-5)	Looper (20)	44,492	51-34
86	July 8	@ Philadelphia Phillies	8-7	Drese (7-7)	Tejeda (3-2)	Cordero (31)	44,688	52-34
87	July 9	@ Philadelphia Phillies	0-1	Wagner (2-1)	Carrasco (3-2)		33,365	52-35
88	July 10	@ Philadelphia Phillies	4-5 (12)	Cormier (3-2)	Kim (1-2)		34,124	52-36
All–Star Break (July 11–13)
89	July 14	@ Milwaukee Brewers	2-4	Wise (3-2)	Majewski (2-1)	Turnbow (18)	30,611	52-37
90	July 15	@ Milwaukee Brewers	3-4 (10)	Santana (2-3)	Ayala (7-6)		40,690	52-38
91	July 16	@ Milwaukee Brewers	5-3	Loaiza (6-5)	Bottalico (2-2)	Cordero (32)	45,079	53-38
92	July 17	@ Milwaukee Brewers	3-5	Ohka (6-4)	Drese (7-8)	Turnbow (19)	23,543	53-39
93	July 18	Colorado Rockies	4-5	Acevedo (1-0)	Cordero (2-2)	Fuentes (13)	30,165	53-40
94	July 19	Colorado Rockies	4-0	Patterson (4-2)	Chacón (1-6)	Cordero (33)	30,655	54-40
95	July 20	Colorado Rockies	2-3	Jennings (6-9)	Hernández (12-4)	Fuentes (14)	32,381	54-41
96	July 21	Houston Astros	2-3	Oswalt (13-8)	Loaiza (6-6)	Lidge (22)	36,840	54-42
97	July 22	Houston Astros	1-14	Clemens (8-4)	Drese (7-9)		38,019	54-43
98	July 23	Houston Astros	4-2	Armas (5-4)	Backe (8-7)	Cordero (34)	42,680	55-43
99	July 24	Houston Astros	1-4 (14)	Springer (3-3)	Carrasco (3-3)	Lidge (23)	39,203	55-44
100	July 26	@ Atlanta Braves	2-3 (10)	Reitsma (3-2)	Stanton (1-3)		43,308	55-45
101	July 27	@ Atlanta Braves	3-4	Kolb (3-6)	Majewski (2-2)	Reitsma (11)	40,625	55-46
102	July 28	@ Atlanta Braves	4-5	Sosa (6-1)	Drese (7-10)	Reitsma (12)	40,269	55-47
103	July 29	@ Florida Marlins	3-4	Beckett (10-6)	Armas (5-5)	Jones (19)	29,322	55-48
104	July 30	@ Florida Marlins	0-3	Burnett (8-6)	Patterson (4-3)	Jones (20)	25,308	55-49
105	July 31	@ Florida Marlins	4-2	Hernández (13-4)	Moehler (6-8)	Cordero (35)	30,397	56-49

August (13-15)

#	Date	Opponent	Score	Win	Loss	Save	Attendance	Record
106	August 2	Los Angeles Dodgers	4-5	Weaver (9-8)	Loaiza (6-7)	Brazobán (21)	36,277	56-50
107	August 3	Los Angeles Dodgers	3-1	Armas (6-5)	Houlton (4-5)	Cordero (36)	36,552	57-50
108	August 4	Los Angeles Dodgers	7-0	Patterson (5-3)	Penny (5-7)		35,484	58-50
109	August 5	San Diego Padres	5-6	Linebrink (5-1)	Cordero (2-3)	Hoffman (28)	34,492	58-51
110	August 6	San Diego Padres	2-3	Astacio (3-10)	Drese (7-11)	Hoffman (29)	38,076	58-52
111	August 7	San Diego Padres	0-3	Peavy (10-4)	Loaiza (6-8)		36,440	58-53
112	August 9	@ Houston Astros	6-5	Patterson (6-3)	Astacio (2-5)	Cordero (37)	34,255	59-53
113	August 10	@ Houston Astros	6-7	Rodríguez (7-5)	Hernández (13-5)	Lidge (28)	34,309	59-54
114	August 11	@ Houston Astros	3-6	Pettitte (10-8)	Drese (7-12)		35,036	59-55
115	August 12	@ Colorado Rockies	4-2	Loaiza (7-8)	Wright (6-13)	Cordero (38)	28,598	60-55
116	August 13	@ Colorado Rockies	8-0	Armas (7-5)	Kim (3-9)		31,447	61-55
117	August 14	@ Colorado Rockies	9-2	Patterson (7-3)	Acevedo (2-3)		24,552	62-55
118	August 15	@ Philadelphia Phillies	6-3	Hernández (14-5)	Myers (10-6)		40,627	63-55
	August 16	@ Philadelphia Phillies	Postponed (rain) Rescheduled for August 18 as part of a double header					
119	August 17	@ Philadelphia Phillies	3-4	Lieber (12-10)	Loaiza (7-9)	Wagner (28)	33,450	63-56
120	August 18 (1)	@ Philadelphia Phillies	1-2	Padilla (6-11)	Armas (7-6)	Wagner (29)	30,046	63-57
121	August 18 (2)	@ Philadelphia Phillies	5-4	Ayala (8-6)	Urbina (4-4)	Cordero (39)	34,492	64-57
122	August 19	@ New York Mets	0-1	Seo (5-1)	Patterson (7-4)	Looper (24)	38,196	64-58
123	August 20	@ New York Mets	8-9 (10)	Hernández (6-5)	Majewski (2-3)		51,785	64-59
124	August 21	@ New York Mets	7-4 (10)	Loaiza (8-9)	Benson (9-5)		42,412	65-59
125	August 23	Cincinnati Reds	2-6	Hudson (5-6)	Armas (7-7)		35,656	65-60
126	August 24	Cincinnati Reds	5-3	Patterson (8-4)	Ortiz (8-9)	Cordero (40)	32,641	66-60
127	August 25	Cincinnati Reds	3-5	Claussen (9-8)	Hernández (14-6)	Weathers (11)	40,762	66-61
128	August 26	St. Louis Cardinals	4-1	Loaiza (9-9)	Suppan (12-10)	Cordero (41)	37,885	67-61
129	August 27	St. Louis Cardinals	0-6	Marquis (10-13)	White (0-1)		44,254	67-62
130	August 28	St. Louis Cardinals	0-6	Thompson (2-0)	Halama (1-2)		41,130	67-63
	August 29	@ Atlanta Braves	Postponed (rain) Rescheduled for August 31 as part of a double header					
131	August 30	@ Atlanta Braves	3-2	Bergmann (1-0)	Sosa (9-3)	Cordero (42)	20,001	68-63
132	August 31 (1)	@ Atlanta Braves	3-5	Ramírez (11-8)	Loaiza (9-10)	Farnsworth (8)	25,555 (Note: The two games on August 31 were played as a single-admission doubleheader with attendance counted only for the two games combined.)	68-64
133	August 31 (2)	@ Atlanta Braves	4-3	Stanton (2-3)	Reitsma (3-5)	Cordero (43)	25,555	69-64

September (12-15)

#	Date	Opponent	Score	Win	Loss	Save	Attendance	Record
134	September 1	@ Atlanta Braves	7-8 (10)	Davies (7-3)	Ayala (8-7)		19,053	69-65
135	September 2	Philadelphia Phillies	1-7	Padilla (8-12)	Halama (1-3)		28,939	69-66
136	September 3	Philadelphia Phillies	5-4 (12)	Carrasco (4-3)	López (0-1)		30,561	70-66
137	September 4	Philadelphia Phillies	6-1	Loaiza (10-10)	Floyd (1-2)		32,251	71-66
138	September 5	Florida Marlins	5-2	Hernández (15-6)	Vargas (5-3)		32,150	72-66
139	September 6	Florida Marlins	2-4	Valdez (2-1)	Rasner (0-1)	Jones (35)	24.936	72-67
140	September 7	Florida Marlins	1-12	Willis (20-8)	Halama (1-4)		25,702	72-68
141	September 8	Florida Marlins	4-8	Beckett (13-8)	Patterson (8-5)		27,625	72-69
142	September 9	Atlanta Braves	8-6	Majewski (3-3)	Foster (4-2)	Cordero (44)	36,295	73-69
143	September 10	Atlanta Braves	0-4	Sosa (11-3)	Hernández (15-7)		44,083	73-70
144	September 11	Atlanta Braves	7-9	McBride (1-0)	Cordero (2-4)	Farnsworth (12)	31,384	73-71
145	September 13	@ New York Mets	4-2	Majewski (4-3)	Glavine (10-13)	Cordero (45)	34,143	74-71
146	September 14	@ New York Mets	6-3	Loaiza (11-10)	Benson (9-8)	Cordero (46)	24,049	75-71
147	September 15	@ New York Mets	6-5 (10)	Bergmann (2-0)	Hernández (6-6)	Majewski (1)	21,441	76-71
148	September 16	@ San Diego Padres	5-1	Patterson (9-5)	Peavy (12-7)		38,480	77-71
149	September 17	@ San Diego Padres	5-8 (12)	Linebrink (7-1)	Rauch (1-4)		37,707	77-72
150	September 18	@ San Diego Padres	1-2	Otsuka (2-6)	Eischen (2-1)		38,054	77-73
151	September 20	San Francisco Giants	3-4	Taschner (2-0)	Hernández (15-8)	Benítez (17)	32,403	77-74
152	September 21	San Francisco Giants	1-5	Hennessey (5-8)	Patterson (9-6)	Benítez (18)	32,076	77-75
153	September 22	San Francisco Giants	2-0	Rauch (2-4)	Tomko (7-15)	Cordero (47)	29,807	78-75
154	September 23	New York Mets	2-5 (10)	Hernández (8-6)	Majewski (4-4)	Heilman (2)	30,194	78-76
155	September 24	New York Mets	2-5	Glavine (12-13)	Hernández (15-9)	Hernández (2)	32,467	78-77
156	September 25	New York Mets	5-6	Padilla (2-1)	Hughes (1-1)	Heilman (3)	29,967	78-78
157	September 26	@ Florida Marlins	4-0	Carrasco (5-3)	Vargas (5-5)		11,467	79-78
158	September 27	@ Florida Marlins	11-1	Stanton (3-3)	Willis (22-10)		11,507	80-78
159	September 28	@ Florida Marlins	11-7	Loaiza (12-10)	Moehler (6-12)		11,961	81-78
160	September 30	Philadelphia Phillies	3-4	Lidle (13-11)	Hernández (15-10)	Wagner (37)	30,375	81-79

October (0-2)

#	Date	Opponent	Score	Win	Loss	Save	Attendance	Record
161	October 1	Philadelphia Phillies	4-8	Myers (13-8)	Patterson (9-7)		32,903	81-80
162	October 2	Philadelphia Phillies	3-9	Lieber (17-13)	Carrasco (5-4)	Wagner (38)	36,491	81-81

== Player stats ==
=== Batting ===
Note: Pos = Position; G = Games played; AB = At bats; R = Runs scored; H = Hits; 2B = Doubles; 3B = Triples; HR = Home runs; RBI = Runs batted in; AVG = Batting average; SB = Stolen bases

Complete offensive statistics are available here.

Pos	Player	G	AB	R	H	2B	3B	HR	RBI	AVG	SB
C	Brian Schneider	116	369	38	99	20	1	10	44	.268	1
1B	Nick Johnson	131	453	66	131	35	3	15	74	.289	4
2B	José Vidro	87	309	38	85	21	2	7	32	.275	0
SS	Cristian Guzmán	142	456	39	100	19	6	4	31	.219	7
3B	Vinny Castilla	142	494	53	125	36	1	12	66	.253	4
LF	Marlon Byrd	74	216	20	57	15	2	2	26	.264	5
CF	Brad Wilkerson	148	565	76	140	42	7	11	57	.248	8
RF	José Guillén	148	551	81	156	32	2	24	76	.283	1
MI	Jamey Carroll	113	303	44	76	8	1	0	22	.251	3
OF	Ryan Church	102	268	41	77	15	3	9	42	.287	3
CF	Preston Wilson	68	253	34	66	14	1	10	43	.261	3
C	Gary Bennett	68	199	11	44	7	0	1	21	.221	0
IF	Carlos Baerga	93	158	18	40	7	0	2	19	.253	0
2B	Junior Spivey	28	77	15	17	7	0	2	7	.221	2
UT	Tony Blanco	56	62	7	11	3	0	1	7	.177	1
3B	Ryan Zimmerman	20	58	6	23	10	0	0	6	.397	0
UT	Wil Cordero	29	51	2	6	2	0	0	2	.118	0
MI	Deivi Cruz	20	51	2	13	1	0	0	1	.255	0
OF	Brandon Watson	25	40	8	7	1	1	1	5	.175	0
OF	Termel Sledge	20	37	7	9	0	1	1	8	.243	2
UT	Jeffrey Hammonds	13	32	3	7	1	0	0	1	.219	0
OF	J. J. Davis	14	26	0	6	0	0	0	2	.231	1
OF	Matthew Cepicky	11	25	1	6	3	0	0	3	.240	0
IF	Rick Short	11	15	4	6	2	0	2	4	.400	0
CF	Endy Chávez	7	9	2	2	1	0	0	1	.222	0
IF	Brendan Harris	4	9	1	3	1	0	1	3	.333	0
RF	Kenny Kelly	17	4	3	1	1	0	0	0	.250	1
C	Keith Osik	6	4	0	0	0	0	0	0	.000	0
PH	Tyrell Godwin	3	3	0	0	0	0	0	0	.000	0
2B	Henry Mateo	1	1	0	0	0	0	0	0	.000	0
P	Liván Hernández	35	82	7	20	2	1	2	7	.244	0
P	Esteban Loaiza	34	74	3	12	2	0	0	4	.162	0
P	John Patterson	31	59	2	6	3	0	0	0	.102	0
P	Tony Armas Jr.	19	32	1	4	0	0	0	1	.125	0
P	Ryan Drese	12	14	0	1	0	0	0	0	.071	0
P	Tomo Ohka	11	16	1	4	0	0	0	0	.250	0
P	Héctor Carrasco	64	8	1	0	0	0	0	0	.000	0
P	Zach Day	12	8	0	1	0	0	0	0	.125	0
P	Jon Rauch	15	7	1	1	0	0	0	1	.143	0
P	Gary Majewski	79	6	0	0	0	0	0	0	.000	0
P	Sun-woo Kim	12	4	0	0	0	0	0	0	.000	0
P	John Halama	10	5	0	1	0	0	0	0	.200	0
P	Jason Bergmann	15	3	2	1	0	0	0	0	.333	0
P	Luis Ayala	68	3	0	1	0	0	0	0	.333	0
P	Joey Eischen	58	3	0	1	0	0	0	0	.333	0
P	Claudio Vargas	4	2	0	1	0	0	0	0	.500	0
P	Matt White	1	1	0	0	0	0	0	0	.000	0
P	Mike Stanton	30	1	1	0	0	0	0	0	.000	0
P	Joe Horgan	8	0	0	0	0	0	0	0	–	0
P	Chad Cordero	74	0	0	0	0	0	0	0	–	0
P	Antonio Osuna	34	0	0	0	0	0	0	0	–	0
P	T. J. Tucker	13	0	0	0	0	0	0	0	–	0
P	Travis Hughes	14	0	0	0	0	0	0	0	–	0
P	C. J. Nitkowski	7	0	0	0	0	0	0	0	–	0
P	Darrell Rasner	5	0	0	0	0	0	0	0	–	0
	Team totals	162	5426	639	1367	311	32	117	615	.252	45

=== Pitching ===
Note: Pos = Position; W = Wins; L = Losses; ERA = Earned run average; G = Games pitched; GS = Games started; SV = Saves; IP = Innings pitched; H = Hits allowed; R = Runs allowed; ER = Earned runs allowed; BB = Walks allowed; K = Strikeouts

Complete pitching statistics are available here.

Pos	Player	W	L	ERA	G	GS	SV	IP	H	R	ER	BB	K
SP	Liván Hernández	15	10	3.98	35	35	0	246.1	268	116	109	84	147
SP	Esteban Loaiza	12	10	3.77	34	34	0	217.0	227	93	91	55	173
SP	John Patterson	9	7	3.13	31	31	0	198.1	172	61	56	45	59
SP	Tony Armas Jr.	7	7	4.97	19	19	0	101.1	100	57	56	54	59
SP	Ryan Drese	3	6	4.98	11	11	0	59.2	66	38	33	22	26
CL	Chad Cordero	2	4	1.82	74	0	47	74.1	55	24	15	17	61
RP	Héctor Carrasco	5	4	2.04	64	5	2	88.1	59	23	20	38	75
RP	Gary Majewski	4	4	2.93	79	0	1	86.0	80	32	28	37	50
RP	Luis Ayala	8	7	2.66	68	0	1	71.0	75	23	21	14	40
RP	Joey Eischen	2	1	3.22	57	0	0	36.1	34	14	13	19	30
	Tomo Ohka	4	3	3.33	10	9	0	54.0	44	23	20	27	17
	Zach Day	1	2	6.75	12	5	0	36.0	41	29	27	25	16
	Jon Rauch	2	4	3.60	15	1	0	30.0	24	12	12	11	23
	Sun-woo Kim	1	2	6.14	12	2	0	29.1	41	20	20	8	17
	Mike Stanton	2	1	3.58	30	0	0	27.2	31	13	11	9	14
	John Halama	0	3	4.64	10	3	0	21.1	23	11	11	8	11
	Jason Bergmann	2	0	2.75	15	1	0	19.2	14	6	6	11	21
	Travis Hughes	1	1	5.54	14	0	0	13.0	18	8	8	8	8
	Claudio Vargas	0	3	9.24	4	4	0	12.2	22	15	13	7	5
	T. J. Tucker	1	0	6.39	13	0	0	12.2	20	9	9	2	5
	Darrell Rasner	0	1	3.68	5	1	0	7.1	5	3	3	2	4
	Joe Horgan	0	0	21.00	8	0	0	6.0	19	15	14	4	5
	Matt White	0	1	9.00	1	1	0	4.0	4	4	4	3	3
	C. J. Nitkowski	0	0	8.10	7	0	0	3.1	5	3	3	2	2
	Antonio Osuna	0	0	42.43	4	0	0	2.1	9	11	11	7	0
	Team totals	81	81	3.87	162	162	51	1458.0	1456	673	627	539	997

=== Team leaders ===
==== Batting ====
Stat	Player	Total
Avg.	Nick Johnson	.289
HR	Preston Wilson; José Guillén	25 (10 with Nationals); 24
RBI	Preston Wilson; José Guillén	90 (43 with Nationals); 76
R	José Guillén	81
H	José Guillén	156
SB	Brad Wilkerson	8

==== Pitching ====
Stat	Player	Total
W	Liván Hernández	15
L	Liván Hernández; Esteban Loaiza	10
ERA	John Patterson	3.13
SO	John Patterson	185
SV	Chad Cordero	47
IP	Liván Hernández	246.1

== Awards and honors ==
=== Nationals among league leaders ===
==== Batting ====
Stat	Player	Total	NL Rank	MLB Rank
OBP	Nick Johnson	.408	6	8 (tie)
2B	Brad Wilkerson	42	7 (tie)	11 (tie)
3B	Brad Wilkerson	7	7 (tie)	12 (tie)

==== Pitching ====
Stat	Player	Total	NL Rank	MLB Rank
SV	Chad Cordero	47	1	1
HLD	Gary Majewski; Luis Ayala	23	5; 6 (tie)	10 (tie); 12 (tie)
W	Liván Hernández	15	9 (tie)	16 (tie)

=== All-Stars ===
- Liván Hernández, SP

=== Annual awards ===
- National League Rolaids Relief Man Award: Chad Cordero

== Farm system ==
Level	Team	League	Manager
AAA	New Orleans Zephyrs	Pacific Coast League	Tim Foli
AA	Harrisburg Senators	Eastern League	Keith Bodie
A	Potomac Nationals	Carolina League	Bob Henley
A	Savannah Sand Gnats	South Atlantic League	Randy Knorr
A-Short Season	Vermont Expos	New York–Penn League	José Alguacil and Bobby Williams
Rookie	GCL Nationals	Gulf Coast League	Wendell Kim
