= 2005 New York Mets season =

2005 New York Mets
- League: National League
- Division: East
- Ballpark: Shea Stadium
- City: New York
- Record: 83–79 (.512)
- Divisional place: 4th
- Owners: Fred Wilpon
- General manager: Omar Minaya
- Manager: Willie Randolph
- Television: WPIX (Tom Seaver, Dave O'Brien); Fox Sports New York/MSG (Fran Healy, Ted Robinson, Keith Hernandez)
- Radio: WFAN (Gary Cohen, Howie Rose, Ed Coleman); WADO (spanish) (Juan Alicea, Billy Berroa)

The 2005 New York Mets season was the 44th regular season for the Mets. They went 83–79 and finished 4th in the National League East. They were managed by Willie Randolph. They played home games at Shea Stadium. The 2005 season is also noteworthy for being Mike Piazza's last season as a Met. In the last game of the season, he was given a long standing ovation from the fans. The Mets had a winning record for the first time since 2001.

== Regular season ==
=== Season standings ===
==== National League East ====
NL East
Team	W	L	Pct.	GB	Home	Road
Atlanta Braves	90	72	.556	—	53‍–‍28	37‍–‍44
Philadelphia Phillies	88	74	.543	2	46‍–‍35	42‍–‍39
Florida Marlins	83	79	.512	7	45‍–‍36	38‍–‍43
New York Mets	83	79	.512	7	48‍–‍33	35‍–‍46
Washington Nationals	81	81	.500	9	41‍–‍40	40‍–‍41

==== Record vs. opponents ====
2005 National League record Source: MLB Standings Grid – 2005
Team	AZ	ATL	CHC	CIN	COL	FLA	HOU	LAD	MIL	NYM	PHI	PIT	SD	SF	STL	WAS	AL
Arizona	—	3–3	5–2	2–4	11–7	2–4	3–3	13–5	2–4	1–6	3–4	3–4	10–9	7–11	2–5	2–4	8–10
Atlanta	3–3	—	6–1	7–3	2–4	10–8	5–1	3–3	3–3	13–6	9–10	4–3	1–5	4–2	3–3	10–9	7–8
Chicago	2–5	1–6	—	6–9	4–3	5–4	9–7	4–2	7–9	2–4	2–4	11–5	4–3	5–2	10–6	1–5	6–9
Cincinnati	4–2	3–7	9–6	—	3–3	2–4	4–12	3–4	6–10	3–3	3–4	9–7	4–2	3–5	5–11	5–1	7-8
Colorado	7–11	4–2	3–4	3–3	—	3–3	1–5	11–8	1–5	3–4	2–4	3–7	7–11	7–11	4–4	2–4	6–9
Florida	4–2	8–10	4–5	4–2	3–3	—	4–3	5–2	3–4	8–10	9–10	3–4	2–4	4–2	3–4	9–9	10–5
Houston	3–3	1–5	7–9	12–4	5–1	3-4	—	4–2	10–5	5–5	6–0	9–7	4–3	3–4	5–11	5–2	7–8
Los Angeles	5–13	3–3	2–4	4–3	8–11	2–5	2–4	—	5–1	3–3	3–3	5–2	11–7	9–10	2–5	2–4	5–13
Milwaukee	4–2	3–3	9–7	10–6	5–1	4–3	5–10	1–5	—	3–3	4–5	9–7	3–4	4–3	5–11	4–4	8–7
New York	6–1	6–13	4–2	3–3	4–3	10–8	5–5	3–3	3–3	—	11–7	3–3	4–2	3–3	2–5	11–8	5–10
Philadelphia	4-3	10–9	4–2	4–3	4–2	10–9	0–6	3–3	5–4	7–11	—	4–3	6–0	5–1	4–2	11–8	7–8
Pittsburgh	4–3	3–4	5–11	7–9	7–3	4–3	7–9	2–5	7–9	3–3	3–4	—	3–4	2–4	4–12	1–5	5–7
San Diego	9–10	5–1	3–4	2–4	11–7	4–2	3–4	7–11	4–3	2–4	0–6	4–3	—	12–6	4–3	5–1	7–11
San Francisco	11–7	2–4	2–5	5–3	11–7	2–4	4–3	10–9	3–4	3–3	1–5	4–2	6–12	—	2–4	3–3	6–12
St. Louis	5–2	3–3	6–10	11–5	4–4	4-3	11–5	5–2	11–5	5–2	2–4	12–4	3–4	4–2	—	4–2	10–5
Washington	4–2	9–10	5–1	1–5	4–2	9-9	2–5	4–2	4–4	8–11	8–11	5–1	1–5	3–3	2–4	—	12–6

=== Roster ===
2005 New York Mets
**Roster**
**Pitchers**: 36 Manny Aybar; 19 Heath Bell; 34 Kris Benson; 35 Mike DeJean; 47 Tom Glavine; 32 Danny Graves; 46 Tim Hamulack; 48 Aaron Heilman; 49 Félix Heredia; 39 Roberto Hernández; 23 Kazuhisa Ishii; 17 Dae-Sung Koo; 40 Braden Looper; 45 Pedro Martínez; 27 Mike Matthews; 28 Juan Padilla; 22 Royce Ring; 33 José Santiago; 26 Jae Weong Seo; 10 Shingo Takatsu; 29 Steve Trachsel; 38 Víctor Zambrano	**Catchers**: 11 Ramón Castro; 33 Mike DiFelice; 31 Mike Piazza; **Infielders**: 18 Marlon Anderson; 3 Miguel Cairo; 13 Brian Daubach; 1 Anderson Hernández; 27 Mike Jacobs; 25 Kazuo Matsui; 16 Doug Mientkiewicz; 35 José Offerman; 7 José Reyes; 4 Chris Woodward; 5 David Wright	**Outfielders**: 15 Carlos Beltrán; 44 Mike Cameron; 20 Víctor Díaz; 30 Cliff Floyd; 57 Eric Valent; 21 Gerald Williams	**Manager**: 12 Willie Randolph; **Coaches**: 50 Manny Acta (third base); 2 Sandy Alomar Sr. (bench); 52 Guy Conti (bullpen pitching); 54 Rick Down (hitting); 53 Jerry Manuel (first base); 55 Tom Nieto (catching); 51 Rick Peterson (pitching)

=== Game log ===
Legend
Mets Win	Mets Loss	Game Postponed	Eliminated from playoff spot
Bold = Mets team member

2005 Game Log
Overall: 83–79 (Home: 48–33; Away: 35–46)
April: (11–13) Home: 8–4; Away: 3–9

#	Date	Opponent	Score	Win	Loss	Save	Location	Attendance	Record
1	April 4	@ Reds	6–7	Graves (1–0)	**Looper** (0–1)	—	Great American Ball Park	42,794	0–1
2	April 6	@ Reds	5–9	Milton (1–0)	**Glavine** (0–1)	—	Great American Ball Park	22,301	0–2
3	April 7	@ Reds	1–6	Harang (1–0)	**Ishii** (0–1)	Graves (1)	Great American Ball Park	16,048	0–3
4	April 8	@ Braves	1–3	Thomson (1–0)	**Zambrano** (0–1)	Kolb (3)	Turner Field	50,939	0–4
5	April 9	@ Braves	3–6	Bernero (2–0)	**Heilman** (0–1)	—	Turner Field	40,604	0–5
6	April 10	@ Braves	6–1	**Martinez** (1–0)	Smoltz (0–2)	—	Turner Field	36,601	1–5
7	April 11	Astros	8–4	**R. Hernandez** (1–0)	Springer (0–1)	—	**Shea Stadium**	53,663	2–5
8	April 13	Astros	1–0 (11)	**DeJean** (1–0)	Wheeler (0–1)	—	**Shea Stadium**	22,431	3–5
9	April 14	Astros	4–3	**Matthews** (1–0)	Franco (0–1)	**Looper** (1)	**Shea Stadium**	17,214	4–5
10	April 15	Marlins	4–0	**Heilman** (1–1)	Beckett (2–1)	—	**Shea Stadium**	49,448	5–5
11	April 16	Marlins	4–3	**Looper** (1–1)	Mota (0–1)	—	**Shea Stadium**	55,351	6–5
12	April 17	Marlins	2–5	Burnett (2–1)	**Glavine** (0–2)	—	**Shea Stadium**	55,266	6–6
13	April 18	@ Phillies	4–5	Wolf (1–1)	**Ishii** (0–2)	Worrell (1)	Citizens Bank Park	25,236	6–7
14	April 19	@ Phillies	16–4	**Zambrano** (1–1)	Padilla (0–1)	—	Citizens Bank Park	28,063	7–7
15	April 20	@ Marlins	2–9	Beckett (3–1)	**Heilman** (1–2)	—	Dolphins Stadium	21,339	7–8
16	April 21	@ Marlins	10–1	**Martinez** (2–0)	Leiter (0–2)	—	Dolphins Stadium	27,674	8–8
17	April 22	Nationals	3–1	**Glavine** (1–2)	Loaiza (0–1)	**Looper** (2)	**Shea Stadium**	28,488	9–8
18	April 23	Nationals	10–5	**Seo** (1–0)	Ohka (1–3)	—	**Shea Stadium**	44,058	10–8
19	April 24	Nationals	4–11	L. Hernandez (2–2)	**Zambrano** (1–2)	—	**Shea Stadium**	43,313	10–9
20	April 25	Braves	5–4	**Heilman** (2–2)	Ramirez (1–2)	**Looper** (3)	**Shea Stadium**	16,874	11–9
21	April 26	Braves	3–4	Smoltz (1–3)	**Martinez** (2–1)	Foster (1)	**Shea Stadium**	31,511	11–10
22	April 27	Braves	4–8	Hampton (3–0)	**Glavine** (1–3)	—	**Shea Stadium**	21,087	11–11
23	April 29	@ Nationals	1–5	L. Hernandez (3–2)	**Seo** (1–1)	Cordero (5)	RFK Stadium	30,627	11–12
24	April 30	@ Nationals	3–5 (8)	Ohka (2–3)	**Zambrano** (1–3)	Carrasco (1)	RFK Stadium	40,913	11–13

May: (15–13) Home: 8–6; Away: 7–7

#	Date	Opponent	Score	Win	Loss	Save	Location	Attendance	Record
25	May 1	@ Nationals	6–3	**Hernandez** (2–0)	Ayala (1–1)	**Looper** (4)	RFK Stadium	27,333	12–13
26	May 2	Phillies	5–1	**Martinez** (3–1)	Adams (0–1)	—	**Shea Stadium**	16,897	13–13
27	May 3	Phillies	3–10	Myers (2–1)	**Glavine** (1–4)	—	**Shea Stadium**	17,051	13–14
28	May 4	Phillies	3–2	**Seo** (2–1)	Wolf (1–4)	**Looper** (5)	**Shea Stadium**	21,356	14–14
29	May 5	Phillies	7–5	**Heilman** (3–2)	Padilla (0–4)	**Looper** (6)	**Shea Stadium**	19,553	15–14
30	May 6	@ Brewers	7–4	**Zambrano** (2–3)	Davis (3–4)	**Looper** (7)	Miller Park	21,067	16–14
31	May 7	@ Brewers	7–5	**Martinez** (4–1)	Santana (0–1)	**Hernandez** (1)	Miller Park	39,589	17–14
32	May 8	@ Brewers	4–5	Turnbow (4–1)	**DeJean** (1–1)	—	Miller Park	17,626	17–15
33	May 9	@ Cubs	7–4	**DeJean** (2–1)	Hawkins (1–4)	**Looper** (8)	Wrigley Field	37,562	18–15
34	May 10	@ Cubs	0–7	Maddux (2–1)	**Benson** (0–1)	—	Wrigley Field	38,813	18–16
35	May 11	@ Cubs	3–4 (10)	Dempster (2–3)	**Bell** (0–1)	—	Wrigley Field	38,475	18–17
36	May 13	Cardinals	2–0	**Glavine** (2–4)	Marquis (5–2)	**Looper** (9)	**Shea Stadium**	43,495	19–17
37	May 14	Cardinals	6–7	Tavarez (1–1)	**Hernandez** (2–1)	Isringhausen (8)	**Shea Stadium**	40,921	19–18
38	May 15	Cardinals	2–4	Morris (3–0)	**Heilman** (3–3)	Isringhausen (9)	**Shea Stadium**	32,949	19–19
39	May 16	Reds	9–2	**Benson** (1–1)	Wilson (1–5)	—	**Shea Stadium**	19,963	20–19
40	May 17	Reds	2–1	**DeJean** (3–1)	Ortiz (1–2)	**Looper** (10)	**Shea Stadium**	28,426	21–19
41	May 18	Reds	10–6	**Glavine** (3–4)	Milton (2–5)	—	**Shea Stadium**	26,607	22–19
42	May 20	Yankees	2–5	Brown (3–4)	**Zambrano** (2–4)	Rivera (8)	**Shea Stadium**	55,740	22–20
43	May 21	Yankees	7–5	**Benson** (2–1)	Johnson (4–3)	—	**Shea Stadium**	55,800	23–20
44	May 22	Yankees	3–5	Pavano (4–2)	**Hernandez** (2–2)	Rivera (9)	**Shea Stadium**	55,953	23–21
45	May 23	@ Braves	6–8	Ramirez (3–3)	**Ishii** (0–3)	Kolb (11)	Turner Field	26,132	23–22
46	May 24	@ Braves	0–4	Hudson (5–3)	**Glavine** (3–5)	—	Turner Field	28,927	23–23
47	May 25	@ Braves	0–3	Davies (2–0)	**Zambrano** (2–5)	Reitsma (1)	Turner Field	33,250	23–24
48	May 26	@ Marlins	12–4	**Benson** (3–1)	Castillo (0–1)	—	Dolphins Stadium	20,308	24–24
49	May 27	@ Marlins	1–0	**Martinez** (5–1)	Moehler (2–2)	**Looper** (11)	Dolphins Stadium	25,891	25–24
50	May 28	@ Marlins	6–1	**Ishii** (1–3)	Willis (8–2)	—	Dolphins Stadium	35,223	26–24
51	May 29	@ Marlins	3–6	Beckett (7–3)	**Bell** (0–2)	Jones (8)	Dolphins Stadium	30,214	26–25
52	May 31	Diamondbacks	0–7	Halsey (4–2)	**Benson** (3–2)	—	**Shea Stadium**	33,955	26–26

June: (13–13) Home: 8–6; Away: 5–7

#	Date	Opponent	Score	Win	Loss	Save	Location	Attendance	Record
53	June 1	Diamondbacks	2–1	**Zambrano** (3–5)	Webb (6–2)	**Looper** (12)	**Shea Stadium**	33,436	27–26
54	June 2	Diamondbacks	6–1	**Martinez** (6–1)	Estes (4–4)	—	**Shea Stadium**	28,260	28–26
–	June 3	Giants	Postponed (rain); rescheduled for June 5						
55	June 4	Giants	5–1	**Glavine** (4–5)	Lowry (2–6)	—	**Shea Stadium**	37,194	29–26
56	June 5 (1)	Giants	3–6	Tomko (5–7)	**Ishii** (1–4)	Walker (8)	**Shea Stadium**	N/A	29–27
57	June 5 (2)	Giants	12–1	**Benson** (4–2)	Schmidt (3–2)	—	**Shea Stadium**	33,460	30–27
58	June 7	Astros	3–1	**Martinez** (7–1)	Oswalt (6–7)	—	**Shea Stadium**	39,953	31–27
59	June 8	Astros	1–4	Backe (6–3)	**Zambrano** (3–6)	Lidge (14)	**Shea Stadium**	23,635	31–28
60	June 9	Astros	3–6 (11)	Springer (1–2)	**Bell** (0–3)	Lidge (15)	**Shea Stadium**	30,737	31–29
61	June 10	Angels	2–12	Colon (8–3)	**Ishii** (1–5)	—	**Shea Stadium**	31,131	31–30
62	June 11	Angels	5–3 (10)	**Looper** (2–1)	Donnelly (4–2)	—	**Shea Stadium**	33,889	32–30
63	June 12	Angels	3–4	Shields (5–3)	**Looper** (2–2)	Rodriguez (12)	**Shea Stadium**	43,582	32–31
64	June 14	@ Athletics	0–5	Blanton (2–6)	**Glavine** (4–6)	Street (4)	McAfee Coliseum	18,744	32–32
65	June 15	@ Athletics	2–3	Duchscherer (3–1)	**Ring** (0–1)	—	McAfee Coliseum	27,598	32–33
66	June 16	@ Athletics	9–6	**Benson** (5–2)	Glynn (0–3)	**Looper** (13)	McAfee Coliseum	17,308	33–33
67	June 17	@ Mariners	0–5	Moyer (6–2)	**Ishii** (1–6)	Nelson (1)	Safeco Field	37,443	33–34
68	June 18	@ Mariners	1–4	Franklin (3–8)	**Martinez** (7–2)	Guardado (19)	Safeco Field	45,841	33–35
69	June 19	@ Mariners	5–11	Meche (7–4)	**Glavine** (4–7)	—	Safeco Field	45,785	33–36
70	June 21	@ Phillies	9–5	**Benson** (6–2)	Myers (5–4)	**Looper** (14)	Citizens Bank Park	43,050	34–36
71	June 22	@ Phillies	4–8	Madson (4–2)	**Ring** (0–2)	—	Citizens Bank Park	42,640	34–37
72	June 23	@ Phillies	4–3	**Ishii** (2–6)	Lidle (6–6)	**Looper** (15)	Citizens Bank Park	45,449	35–37
73	June 24	@ Yankees	6–4	**Martinez** (8–2)	Mussina (8–5)	—	Yankee Stadium	55,297	36–37
74	June 25	@ Yankees	10–3	**Glavine** (5–7)	Henn (0–3)	—	Yankee Stadium	55,114	37–37
75	June 26	@ Yankees	4–5	Rivera (4–2)	**Looper** (2–3)	—	Yankee Stadium	55,327	37–38
76	June 28	Phillies	8–3	**Zambrano** (4–6)	Tejeda (1–1)	—	**Shea Stadium**	39,898	38–38
77	June 29	Phillies	3–6	Lidle (7–6)	**Ishii** (2–7)	Wagner (19)	**Shea Stadium**	24,915	38–39
78	June 30	Phillies	5–3	**Martinez** (9–2)	Lieber (8–8)	**Looper** (16)	**Shea Stadium**	36,667	39–39

July: (14–13) Home: 8–5; Away: 6–8

#	Date	Opponent	Score	Win	Loss	Save	Location	Attendance	Record
79	July 1	Marlins	7–6	**R. Hernandez** (3–2)	Mecir (1–3)	**Looper** (17)	**Shea Stadium**	44,853	40–39
80	July 2	Marlins	3–7	Moehler (3–5)	**Benson** (6–3)	—	**Shea Stadium**	41,290	40–40
81	July 3	Marlins	0–3	Willis (13–3)	**Zambrano** (4–7)	—	**Shea Stadium**	37,824	40–41
82	July 4	@ Nationals	5–2	**R. Hernandez** (4–2)	Kim (1–1)	**Looper** (18)	RFK Stadium	44,331	41–41
83	July 5	@ Nationals	2–3	Loaiza (5–5)	**Martinez** (9–3)	Cordero (30)	RFK Stadium	35,087	41–42
84	July 6	@ Nationals	5–3	**Glavine** (6–7)	L. Hernandez (12–3)	**Looper** (19)	RFK Stadium	38,148	42–42
85	July 7	@ Nationals	3–2 (11)	**Bell** (1–3)	Ayala (7–5)	**Looper** (20)	RFK Stadium	44,492	43–42
86	July 8	@ Pirates	5–6 (10)	Mesa (1–5)	**Looper** (2–4)	—	PNC Park	32,563	43–43
87	July 9	@ Pirates	4–11	D. Williams (7–6)	**Ishii** (2–8)	—	PNC Park	36,708	43–44
88	July 10	@ Pirates	6–1	**Martinez** (10–3)	Wells (6–9)	—	PNC Park	26,551	44–44
**76th All-Star Game in Detroit, Michigan**
89	July 14	Braves	6–3	**R. Hernandez** (5–2)	Brower (3–2)	**Looper** (21)	**Shea Stadium**	43,319	45–44
90	July 15	Braves	1–2	Smoltz (10–5)	**R. Hernandez** (5–3)	Reitsma (8)	**Shea Stadium**	34,444	45–45
91	July 16	Braves	0–3	Hudson (7–5)	**Zambrano** (4–8)	Reitsma (9)	**Shea Stadium**	36,078	45–46
92	July 17	Braves	8–1	**Martinez** (11–3)	Hampton (4–2)	—	**Shea Stadium**	34,983	46–46
93	July 19	Padres	3–1 (11)	**Looper** (3–4)	Hammond (5–1)	—	**Shea Stadium**	37,945	47–46
94	July 20	Padres	7–3	**Glavine** (7–7)	W. Williams (5–6)	**Padilla** (1)	**Shea Stadium**	31,697	48–46
95	July 21	Padres	12–0	**Ishii** (3–8)	Peavy (8–4)	—	**Shea Stadium**	33,361	49–46
96	July 22	Dodgers	5–6	Weaver (8–8)	**Zambrano** (4–9)	Brazoban (18)	**Shea Stadium**	50,273	49–47
97	July 23	Dodgers	7–5	**Martinez** (12–3)	Carrara (6–4)	**Looper** (22)	**Shea Stadium**	43,705	50–47
98	July 24	Dodgers	6–0	**Benson** (7–3)	Penny (5–6)	—	**Shea Stadium**	38,008	51–47
99	July 25	@ Rockies	3–5	Acevedo (2–0)	**Glavine** (7–8)	Fuentes (15)	Coors Field	22,216	51–48
100	July 26	@ Rockies	3–4	Francis (9–7)	**Ishii** (3–9)	Fuentes (16)	Coors Field	22,518	51–49
101	July 27	@ Rockies	9–3	**Zambrano** (5–9)	Wright (5–11)	—	Coors Field	26,183	52–49
102	July 28	@ Astros	2–3	Wheeler (1–2)	**R. Hernandez** (5–4)	—	Minute Maid Park	43,552	52–50
103	July 29	@ Astros	2–5	Rodriguez (6–4)	**Benson** (7–4)	Lidge (25)	Minute Maid Park	42,659	52–51
104	July 30	@ Astros	0–2	Pettitte (9–7)	**Glavine** (7–9)	Lidge (26)	Minute Maid Park	43,596	52–52
105	July 31	@ Astros	9–4	**Heilman** (4–3)	Wheeler (1–3)	—	Minute Maid Park	43,028	53–52

August: (16–11) Home: 9–5; Away: 7–6

#	Date	Opponent	Score	Win	Loss	Save	Location	Attendance	Record
106	August 2	Brewers	9–8 (11)	**Looper** (4–4)	Santana (2–5)	—	**Shea Stadium**	32,453	54–52
107	August 3	Brewers	4–6	Helling (1–0)	**Looper** (4–5)	Turnbow (22)	**Shea Stadium**	40,659	54–53
108	August 4	Brewers	9–12	Santana (3–5)	**Hernandez** (5–5)	Turnbow (23)	**Shea Stadium**	30,359	54–54
109	August 5	Cubs	9–5	**Glavine** (8–9)	Hill (0–1)	—	**Shea Stadium**	34,728	55–54
110	August 6	Cubs	2–0	**Seo** (3–1)	Maddux (8–9)	**Looper** (23)	**Shea Stadium**	39,911	56–54
111	August 7	Cubs	6–1	**V. Zambrano** (6–9)	C. Zambrano (8–5)	—	**Shea Stadium**	40,321	57–54
112	August 9	@ Padres	3–8	Park (9–5)	**Martinez** (12–4)	—	Petco Park	41,977	57–55
113	August 10	@ Padres	9–1	**Benson** (8–4)	Lawrence (6–12)	—	Petco Park	43,162	58–55
114	August 11	@ Padres	1–2	Williams (6–8)	**Glavine** (8–10)	Hoffman (30)	Petco Park	35,148	58–56
115	August 12	@ Dodgers	6–7 (10)	Sanchez (4–4)	**Looper** (4–6)	—	Dodger Stadium	54,361	58–57
116	August 13	@ Dodgers	5–1	**Seo** (4–1)	Houlton (4–6)	—	Dodger Stadium	47,096	59–57
117	August 14	@ Dodgers	1–2	Penny (6–7)	**Martinez** (12–5)	—	Dodger Stadium	48,055	59–58
118	August 16	Pirates	6–2	**Benson** (9–4)	Redman (5–13)	—	**Shea Stadium**	37,202	60–58
119	August 17	Pirates	5–1	**Glavine** (9–10)	Fogg (6–8)	**Heilman** (1)	**Shea Stadium**	28,730	61–58
120	August 18	Pirates	0–5	Duke (6–0)	**V. Zambrano** (6–10)	—	**Shea Stadium**	35,653	61–59
121	August 19	Nationals	1–0	**Seo** (5–1)	Patterson (7–4)	**Looper** (24)	**Shea Stadium**	38,196	62–59
122	August 20	Nationals	9–8 (10)	**Hernandez** (6–5)	Majewski (2–3)	—	**Shea Stadium**	51,785	63–59
123	August 21	Nationals	4–7	Loaiza (8–9)	**Benson** (9–5)	—	**Shea Stadium**	42,412	63–60
124	August 22	@ Diamondbacks	4–1	**Glavine** (10–10)	Webb (10–10)	**Looper** (25)	Bank One Ballpark	23,371	64–60
125	August 23	@ Diamondbacks	14–1	**V. Zambrano** (7–10)	Vargas (7–7)	—	Bank One Ballpark	24,699	65–60
126	August 24	@ Diamondbacks	18–4	**Seo** (6–1)	Ortiz (4–8)	—	Bank One Ballpark	22,268	66–60
127	August 25	@ Diamondbacks	3–1	**Martinez** (13–5)	Vazquez (10–13)	**Looper** (26)	Bank One Ballpark	21,683	67–60
128	August 26	@ Giants	1–0	**Trachsel** (1–0)	Correia (2–5)	**Looper** (27)	SBC Park	39,591	68–60
129	August 27	@ Giants	1–2	Schmidt (11–6)	**Glavine** (10–11)	Benitez (6)	SBC Park	42,180	68–61
130	August 28	@ Giants	1–4	Lowry (11–11)	**Benson** (9–6)	Benitez (7)	SBC Park	41,659	68–62
131	August 30	Phillies	6–4	**Padilla** (1–0)	Urbina (4–5)	**Looper** (28)	**Shea Stadium**	36,505	69–62
132	August 31	Phillies	2–8	Myers (12–6)	**Martinez** (13–6)	—	**Shea Stadium**	43,780	69–63

September/October: (14–16) Home: 7–7; Away: 7–9

#	Date	Opponent	Score	Win	Loss	Save	Location	Attendance	Record
133	September 1	Phillies	1–3	Lieber (13–12)	**Glavine** (10–12)	Wagner (32)	**Shea Stadium**	38,316	69–64
134	September 2	@ Marlins	2–4	Willis (19–8)	**Zambrano** (7–11)	Jones (33)	Dolphins Stadium	25,916	69–65
135	September 3	@ Marlins	4–5	Villone (3–5)	**Padilla** (1–1)	Jones (34)	Dolphins Stadium	37,336	69–66
136	September 4	@ Marlins	7–1	**Seo** (7–1)	Burnett (12–9)	—	Dolphins Stadium	23,848	70–66
137	September 5	@ Braves	2–4	Boyer (2–1)	**Trachsel** (1–1)	Farnsworth (10)	Turner Field	33,045	70–67
138	September 6	@ Braves	1–3	Smoltz (14–6)	**Martinez** (13–7)	Farnsworth (11)	Turner Field	21,068	70–68
139	September 7	@ Braves	3–4 (10)	Foster (4–1)	**Looper** (4–7)	—	Turner Field	28,564	70–69
140	September 8	@ Cardinals	0–5	Carpenter (21–4)	**Benson** (9–7)	—	Busch Stadium	47,422	70–70
141	September 9	@ Cardinals	2–3	Marquis (12–13)	**Seo** (7–2)	Isringhausen (35)	Busch Stadium	45,616	70–71
142	September 10	@ Cardinals	2–4	Suppan (14–10)	**Trachsel** (1–2)	Isringhausen (36)	Busch Stadium	48,465	70–72
143	September 11	@ Cardinals	7–2	**Martinez** (14–7)	Morris (14–8)	—	Busch Stadium	45,884	71–72
144	September 13	Nationals	2–4	Majewski (4–3)	**Glavine** (10–13)	Cordero (45)	**Shea Stadium**	34,143	71–73
145	September 14	Nationals	3–6	Loaiza (11–10)	**Benson** (9–8)	Cordero (46)	**Shea Stadium**	24,049	71–74
146	September 15	Nationals	5–6 (10)	Bergmann (2–0)	**R. Hernandez** (6–6)	Majewski (1)	**Shea Stadium**	21,441	71–75
147	September 16	Braves	4–0	**Martinez** (15–7)	Smoltz (14–7)	—	**Shea Stadium**	37,519	72–75
148	September 17	Braves	4–7	Hudson (13–8)	**Trachsel** (1–3)	Farnsworth (14)	**Shea Stadium**	34,191	72–76
149	September 18	Braves	4–1	**Glavine** (11–13)	Thomson (3–5)	—	**Shea Stadium**	31,703	73–76
150	September 20	Marlins	3–2 (12)	**Heilman** (5–3)	Moehler (6–10)	—	**Shea Stadium**	21,275	74–76
151	September 21	Marlins	5–4	**R. Hernandez** (7–6)	Quantrill (2–2)	—	**Shea Stadium**	36,793	75–76
152	September 22	Marlins	1–2	Willis (22–9)	**Martinez** (15–8)	Jones (38)	**Shea Stadium**	25,093	75–77
153	September 23	@ Nationals	5–2 (10)	**R. Hernandez** (8–6)	Majewski (4–4)	**Heilman** (2)	RFK Stadium	30,194	76–77
154	September 24	@ Nationals	5–2	**Glavine** (12–13)	L. Hernandez (15–9)	**R. Hernandez** (2)	RFK Stadium	32,467	77–77
155	September 25	@ Nationals	6–5	**Padilla** (2–1)	Hughes (1–1)	**Heilman** (3)	RFK Stadium	29,967	78–77
156	September 26	@ Phillies	6–5	**Takatsu** (2–2)	Urbina (5–6)	**R. Hernandez** (3)	Citizens Bank Park	28,679	79–77
157	September 27	@ Phillies	3–2	**Padilla** (3–1)	Lieber (16–13)	**Heilman** (4)	Citizens Bank Park	36,150	80–77
158	September 28	@ Phillies	6–16	Padilla (9–12)	**Trachsel** (1–4)	—	Citizens Bank Park	42,250	80–78
159	September 29	Rockies	11–0	**Glavine** (13–13)	S. Kim (6–3)	—	**Shea Stadium**	27,570	81–78
160	September 30	Rockies	3–2	**Benson** (10–8)	B. Kim (5–12)	**Heilman** (5)	**Shea Stadium**	29,133	82–78
161	October 1	Rockies	3–1	**Seo** (8–2)	Esposito (0–2)	**R. Hernandez** (4)	**Shea Stadium**	36,385	83–78
162	October 2	Rockies	3–11	Cook (7–2)	**Zambrano** (7–12)	—	**Shea Stadium**	47,718	83–79

== Player stats ==
=== Batting ===
==== Starters by position ====
Note: Pos = Position; G = Games played; AB = At bats; H = Hits; Avg. = Batting average; HR = Home runs; RBI = Runs batted in

Pos	Player	G	AB	H	Avg.	HR	RBI
C	Mike Piazza	113	398	100	.251	19	62
1B	Doug Mientkiewicz	87	275	66	.240	11	29
2B	Miguel Cairo	100	327	82	.251	2	19
SS	José Reyes	161	696	190	.273	7	58
3B	David Wright	160	575	176	.306	27	102
LF	Cliff Floyd	150	550	150	.273	34	98
CF	Carlos Beltrán	151	582	155	.266	16	78
RF	Víctor Díaz	89	280	72	.257	12	38

==== Other batters ====
Note: G = Games played; AB = At bats; H = Hits; Avg. = Batting average; HR = Home runs; RBI = Runs batted in

Player	G	AB	H	Avg.	HR	RBI
Mike Cameron	76	308	84	.273	12	39
Kazuo Matsui	87	267	68	.255	3	24
Marlon Anderson	123	235	62	.264	7	19
Ramón Castro	99	209	51	.244	8	41
Chris Woodward	81	173	49	.283	3	18
Mike Jacobs	30	100	31	.310	11	23
José Offerman	53	72	18	.250	1	10
Eric Valent	28	43	8	.186	0	1
Gerald Williams	39	30	7	.233	1	3
Brian Daubach	15	25	3	.120	1	3
Anderson Hernández	6	18	1	.056	0	0
Mike Difelice	11	17	2	.118	0	0

=== Pitching ===
==== Starting pitchers ====
Note: G = Games pitched; IP = Innings pitched; W = Wins; L = Losses; ERA = Earned run average; SO = Strikeouts

Player	G	IP	W	L	ERA	SO
Pedro Martínez	31	217	15	8	2.82	208
Tom Glavine	33	211 1/3	13	13	3.53	105
Kris Benson	28	174 1/3	10	8	4.13	95
Víctor Zambrano	31	166 1/3	7	12	4.17	112
Kazuhisa Ishii	19	91	3	9	5.14	53
Jae Weong Seo	14	90 1/3	8	2	2.59	59
Steve Trachsel	6	37	1	4	4.14	24

==== Other pitchers ====
Note: G = Games pitched; IP = Innings pitched; W = Wins; L = Losses; ERA = Earned run average; SO = Strikeouts

Player	G	IP	W	L	ERA	SO
Aaron Heilman	53	108	5	3	3.17	106

==== Relief pitchers ====
Note: G = Games pitched; W = Wins; L = Losses; SV = Saves; ERA = Earned run average; SO = Strikeouts

Player	G	W	L	SV	ERA	SO
Braden Looper	60	4	7	28	3.94	27
Roberto Hernández	67	8	6	4	2.58	61
Heath Bell	42	1	3	0	5.59	43
Dae-Sung Koo	33	0	0	0	3.91	23
Mike DeJean	28	3	1	0	6.31	17
Juan Padilla	24	3	1	1	1.49	17
Manny Aybar	22	0	0	0	6.04	27
Danny Graves	20	0	0	0	5.75	12
Royce Ring	15	0	2	0	5.06	8
Shingo Takatsu	9	1	0	0	2.35	6
Mike Matthews	6	1	0	0	10.80	2
Tim Hamulack	6	0	0	0	23.14	2
José Santiago	4	0	0	0	3.18	3
Félix Heredia	3	0	0	0	0.00	2

== Farm system ==
Level	Team	League	Manager
AAA	Norfolk Tides	International League	Ken Oberkfell
AA	Binghamton Mets	Eastern League	Jack Lind
A	St. Lucie Mets	Florida State League	Tim Teufel
A	Hagerstown Suns	South Atlantic League	Gene Richards
A-Short Season	Brooklyn Cyclones	New York–Penn League	Mookie Wilson
Rookie	Kingsport Mets	Appalachian League	Jesse Levis
Rookie	GCL Mets	Gulf Coast League	Gary Carter
