= Tyrell Godwin =

American baseball player (born 1979)

- Outfielder
- Born: July 10, 1979 (age 46); Wilmington, North Carolina, U.S.
- Batted: Left Threw: Right

MLB debut
- May 27, 2005, for the Washington Nationals

Last MLB appearance
- May 30, 2005, for the Washington Nationals

MLB statistics
- Batting average: .000
- Home runs: 0
- Runs batted in: 0
- Stats at Baseball Reference

Teams
- Washington Nationals (2005)

Carlton Tyrell Godwin (born July 10, 1979) is an American former professional baseball outfielder. He played in Major League Baseball (MLB) for the Washington Nationals.

== College career ==
Godwin played both football and baseball at East Bladen High School, and collegiately while attending the University of North Carolina at Chapel Hill on the Morehead Scholarship.

=== Football ===
Godwin played primarily on special teams during the 1997 and 1998 seasons, leading the Atlantic Coast Conference with a 27.8 kickoff return average in 1998 and setting a school record with a 100-yard kickoff return for a touchdown against Stanford on September 19, 1998. Godwin did not play football for the Tar Heels after the 1998 season, deciding instead to concentrate on baseball.

=== Baseball ===
Godwin played 3 years of baseball for the Tar Heels, batting .337 in 1998, .371 in 1999 and .363 in 2000. Godwin was a third team All-American in 2000.

== Professional career ==
Godwin was drafted by the New York Yankees (in 1997) and the Texas Rangers (in 2000) but did not sign with either team. He eventually signed with the Toronto Blue Jays after being drafted in the 3rd round (91st overall) of the 2001 amateur draft. He played in the Blue Jays' minor league system for four years before the Washington Nationals selected him in the rule 5 draft.

Godwin played in three games for the Nationals during the 2005 season, wearing #1. He continued to play in the minor leagues until 2007.
