= Preston Wilson =

American baseball player and manager (born 1974)

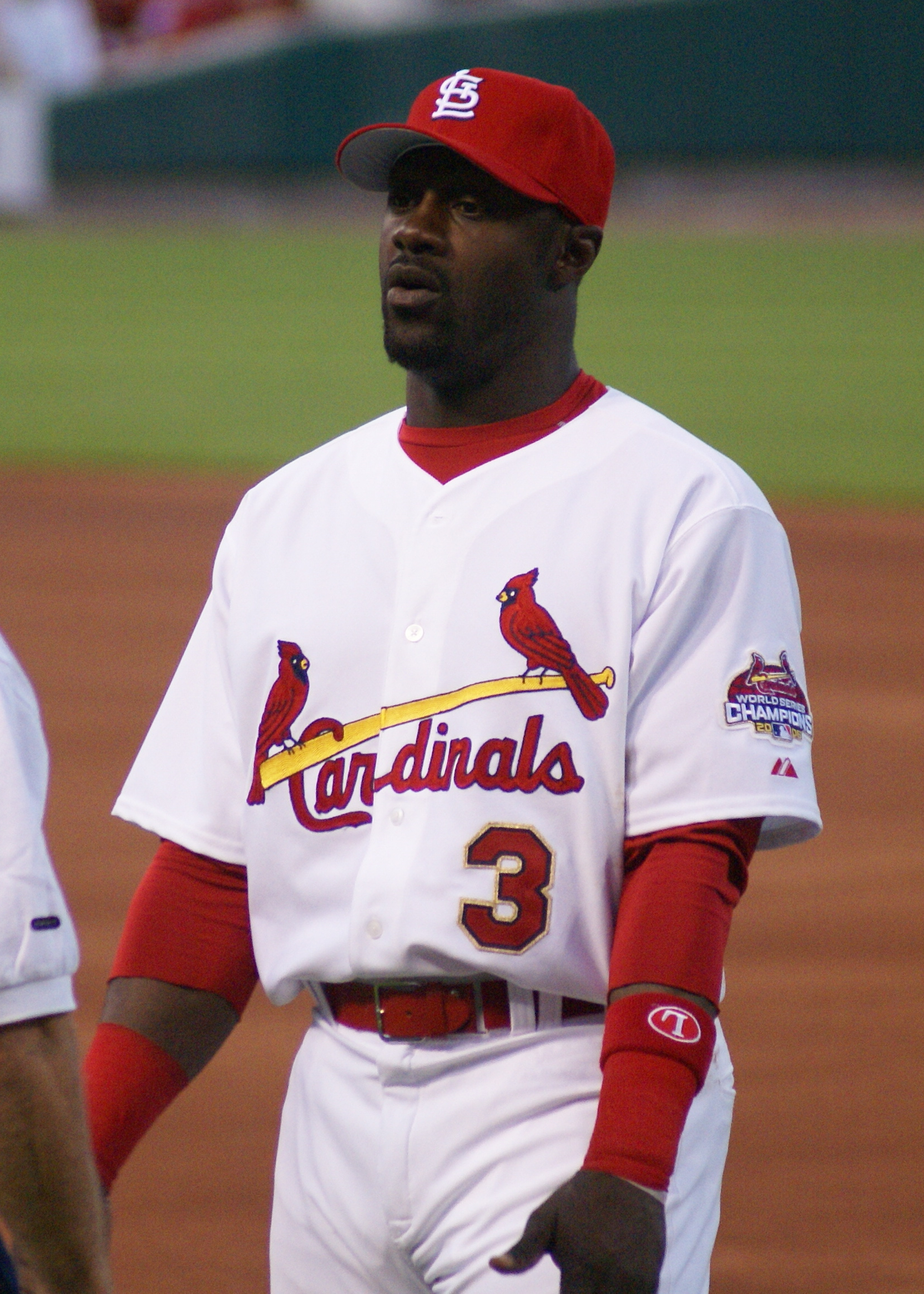
- Wilson with the Cardinals in 2007
- Center fielder
- Born: July 19, 1974 (age 52); Bamberg, South Carolina, U.S.
- Batted: Right Threw: Right

MLB debut
- May 7, 1998, for the New York Mets

Last MLB appearance
- May 5, 2007, for the St. Louis Cardinals

MLB statistics
- Batting average: .264
- Home runs: 189
- Runs batted in: 668
- Stats at Baseball Reference

Teams
- New York Mets (1998); Florida Marlins (1998–2002); Colorado Rockies (2003–2005); Washington Nationals (2005); Houston Astros (2006); St. Louis Cardinals (2006–2007)

Career highlights and awards
- All-Star (2003); World Series champion (2006); NL RBI leader (2003)
Medals
Men's baseball
Representing United States
World Junior Baseball Championship
Silver medal – second place	1992 Monterrey	Team

Preston James Richard Wilson (born July 19, 1974) is an American former professional baseball center fielder and currently the manager of the Aberdeen Ironbirds of the MLB Draft League. He played all or parts of ten seasons in Major League Baseball (MLB) from 1998 to 2007 for the New York Mets, Florida Marlins, Colorado Rockies, Washington Nationals, Houston Astros and St. Louis Cardinals. He is both the nephew and stepson of former New York Mets outfielder Mookie Wilson. (Mookie married Wilson's mother after his brother fathered Wilson.)

== Professional career ==
=== New York Mets ===
At age 17, Wilson was drafted by the Mets out of Bamberg-Ehrhardt High School in the first round of the 1992 MLB draft. The Baseball America 1992 High School Player of the Year, Wilson was ranked among the top 100 prospects in baseball by the magazine four times between 1993 and 1998. He was known to be an aggressive hitter, according to scouts and media sources, based on his propensity to swing at the first pitch and his high strikeout rates.

After spending five seasons below Triple-A and a season in 1998 in the Australian Baseball League with the Hunter Eagles, Wilson finally reached the majors in May 1998. Two weeks after joining the Mets, he was traded to the Florida Marlins with two other minor leaguers for Mike Piazza. He returned to the minor leagues for most of the season.

=== Florida Marlins ===
In 1999, Wilson was the Marlins' regular center fielder. Wilson led the team in home runs and runs batted in as a rookie, and he finished second in the National League (NL)Rookie of the Year balloting to Cincinnati Reds reliever Scott Williamson.

The following season, Wilson joined the 30–30 club, slugging 31 home runs and stealing 36 bases. He added 121 RBIs, good for eighth in the NL. In 2000, he led the major leagues in power–speed number (33.3). Wilson also lived up to his reputation as a free swinger, nearly setting a new record for most strikeouts in a season. His total of 187 fell two shy of Bobby Bonds' record at the time.

Wilson hit 23 home runs in each of the following two seasons, though his overall production dipped, partially due to missed games.

=== Colorado Rockies ===
After the 2002 season, Wilson was involved in a six-player deal which sent him and three other players to the Colorado Rockies for Juan Pierre and Mike Hampton. Wilson rebounded in 2003, when he set career highs with a .282 batting average, 43 doubles, and 36 home runs. He also led the National League with 141 runs batted in and was named to his first All-Star team.

Bothered by a knee injury in 2004, Wilson was limited to 58 games.

=== Washington Nationals ===
Wilson was acquired by the Washington Nationals in July 2005 for pitcher Zach Day and outfielder J. J. Davis. He led the team in homers and RBIs during the second half of the season, finishing with 25 and 90 respectively.

=== Houston Astros ===
In the 2005 offseason, Wilson signed a one-year deal worth $4 million with the Houston Astros, with a team option of three additional years at $24 million and a buyout of $500,000. Previously a center fielder, Wilson shifted to left since Willy Taveras, the previous season's Rookie of the Year runner-up, was already occupying the position. On April 17, 2006, Wilson set an Astros record by striking out five times in a single game. This tied the MLB record. Despite early struggles, Wilson was batting .284 with 46 RBIs at the 2006 All-Star Break, with the potential for another 100+ RBI season. However, his power numbers were well below his previous years. Wilson was released by the Astros on August 15.

=== St. Louis Cardinals ===
The St. Louis Cardinals signed Wilson on August 18, 2006. The Cardinals took another chance on a discarded veteran since veteran center fielder Jim Edmonds was out with post concussion syndrome. Wilson was designated for assignment by Houston on Saturday, August 12, before ultimately being given his release. He joined his new team six days later and was immediately inserted into the starting lineup. Wilson batted sixth and played right field, with Juan Encarnación moving to center field. He made an instant impact for the Cardinals, hitting a home run in an 11–3 rout of the Chicago Cubs on the 18th. The Cardinals went on to become World Champions, giving Wilson a World Series ring, as his stepfather Mookie had in 1986.

The Cardinals re-signed Wilson for 2007, but he suffered a knee injury in early May and missed the rest of the 2007 season. After the end of the 2007 season Wilson was released. Wilson generated little interest during spring training 2008, leaving him a free agent.

On February 14, 2009, Wilson announced his retirement from MLB.

=== Long Island Ducks ===
On March 21, 2009, Preston was signed by the Long Island Ducks. He played under another former New York Mets player in Gary Carter, who was the manager of the Ducks. Wilson played in 48 games for the Ducks, hitting .304 with 7 home runs, 37 RBI, a .344 on-base percentage, and a .474 slugging percentage. He did not return to the Ducks for the 2010 season and was considering a comeback to the major leagues, but never played professionally again.

== Post-playing career ==
=== Broadcasting ===
Wilson spent several years as an analyst for Fox Sports Florida's coverage of the Miami Marlins alongside former Marlins players Jeff Conine and Carl Pavano. In 2016, Wilson, along with Eduardo Perez and Al Leiter, served as an analyst with play-by-play man Rich Waltz. This analyst rotation came about after the Marlins fired longtime analyst Tommy Hutton after the 2015 season. Also in 2016, when his Marlins schedule did not conflict, Wilson served as an analyst for MLB Network. Additionally, Wilson hosted "Marlins Clubhouse," a magazine-style TV show for Fox Sports Florida.

Starting in the 2018 season, Wilson worked for the AT&T Sports Network covering the Houston Astros as a field reporter.

=== Coaching ===
On April 15, 2025, the Frederick Keys of the MLB Draft League announced that Wilson would be their manager for the upcoming 2025 season.

In 2026, the Aberdeen Ironbirds assumed the position in the MLB Draft League formerly held by the Frederick Keys. Wilson was announced as the manager of the relocated team.

== See also ==
- 30–30 club
- List of Major League Baseball annual runs batted in leaders
- List of second-generation Major League Baseball players

Preceded by Todd Helton	Sporting News NL Rookie of the Year; 1999	Succeeded by Rafael Furcal
Preceded by Kerry Wood	Players Choice NL Most Outstanding Rookie; 1999	Succeeded by Rafael Furcal
