= Randy Choate =

American baseball player (born 1975)

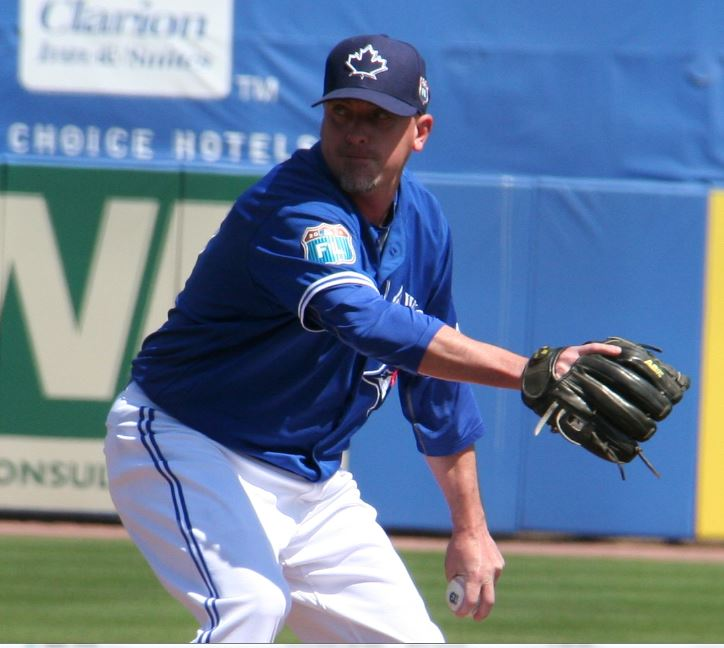
- Choate with the Blue Jays during spring training in 2016
- Pitcher
- Born: September 5, 1975 (age 51); San Antonio, Texas, U.S.
- Batted: Left Threw: Left

MLB debut
- July 1, 2000, for the New York Yankees

Last MLB appearance
- October 2, 2015, for the St. Louis Cardinals

MLB statistics
- Win–loss record: 16–14
- Earned run average: 3.90
- Strikeouts: 348
- Stats at Baseball Reference

Teams
- New York Yankees (2000–2003); Arizona Diamondbacks (2004–2007); Tampa Bay Rays (2009–2010); Florida / Miami Marlins (2011–2012); Los Angeles Dodgers (2012); St. Louis Cardinals (2013–2015)

Career highlights and awards
- World Series champion (2000)

Randol Doyle Choate (born September 5, 1975) is an American former professional baseball pitcher. The New York Yankees selected him in the 1997 Major League Baseball (MLB) draft from Florida State University. Choate made his MLB debut for the Yankees in 2000, and also pitched for the Arizona Diamondbacks, Tampa Bay Rays, Florida/Miami Marlins, Los Angeles Dodgers, and St. Louis Cardinals. He won the 2000 World Series with the Yankees over the New York Mets.

As a left-handed relief pitcher, Choate appeared mainly in matchups against left-handed hitters. His pitching style featured a sidearm delivery that hid the ball effectively from left-handed hitters, while only marginally so against right-handed hitters. His repertoire featured almost exclusively a sinking fastball and slider combination.

== Early life and amateur career ==
Choate was born in San Antonio, Texas. He attended Churchill High School, lettering in baseball. He then attended Florida State University, where he was a third-team collegiate All-American in 1996 and a second-team All-American and Atlantic Coast Conference All-Star in 1997. In 1996, he played collegiate summer baseball with the Hyannis Mets of the Cape Cod Baseball League.

== Professional career ==
=== Draft and minor leagues (1997–2000) ===
Choate was drafted by the New York Yankees in the fifth round of the 1997 Major League Baseball draft and made his professional debut with the Class-A Oneonta Yankees later that season. He split 1998 between the Greensboro Bats and the Tampa Yankees and spent all of 1999 with Tampa before being promoted to the Triple-A Columbus Clippers in 2000.

=== New York Yankees (2000–03) ===
Choate made his Major League debut on July 1, 2000, as a member of the New York Yankees, retiring the only batter he faced in a 6–1 win over the Tampa Bay Devil Rays at Tropicana Field. In his 22 games for the Yankees that year, Choate had a record of 0–1 with a 4.76 ERA, and was a part of the World Series-winning club. After a career best 3–1 record with 3.35 ERA in 2001, he was less effective in 2002 and 2003, playing in just 23 games with a 6.23 ERA. He also spent considerable time in the minors with Columbus.

=== Arizona Diamondbacks (2004–07) ===
The Yankees traded Choate to the Montreal Expos with Nick Johnson and Juan Rivera for Javier Vázquez on December 16, 2003. The following March 27, the Expos then traded him to the Arizona Diamondbacks for pitcher John Patterson. Choate appeared in 74 games for the Diamondbacks, the most games by a left-handed pitcher in Diamondbacks history and the fourth-highest by any pitcher in franchise history. He also achieved a 2–4 record with a 4.62 ERA.

In 2005 and 2006, Choate played in 90 games. However, he played a vast majority of the 2006 season with Arizona's Triple-A affiliate, the Tucson Sidewinders, playing a key role in the bullpen, by helping them win the Pacific Coast League championship.

Choate later signed a minor league contract with the Minnesota Twins on January 9, 2007, but chose to become a free agent on March 24 after being reassigned to a minor league camp three days earlier. He signed a minor league contract to return to the Diamondbacks in April 2007, and was assigned to Tucson. The Diamondbacks purchased his contract from Tucson on June 26, 2007, but he made only two appearances before he was designated for assignment on June 28.

=== Milwaukee Brewers (2008) ===
On November 14, 2007, the Milwaukee Brewers signed him to a one-year contract. During spring training 2008, Choate broke a bone in his left hand. In mid-June, he began his rehab assignment in the minors. He pitched for the first time in the 2008 season for the High-A Brevard County Manatees. He was next moved up to the Triple-A Nashville Sounds. On July 10, Choate was sent outright to the minors. He became a free agent at the end of the season.

=== Tampa Bay Rays (2009–10) ===
Choate signed a minor league contract with the Tampa Bay Rays on January 6, 2009. He earned his first career save on May 29, 2009, against the Minnesota Twins. In 2010, Choate led the American League with 85 appearances while pitching a total of 44 2/3 innings. In two seasons with the Rays, he was 5–3 with a 3.89 ERA in 146 games. In a span of 97 consecutive appearances from September 10, 2010, to June 12, 2012, Choate allowed one or zero hits each time.

=== Florida/Miami Marlins (2011–12) ===
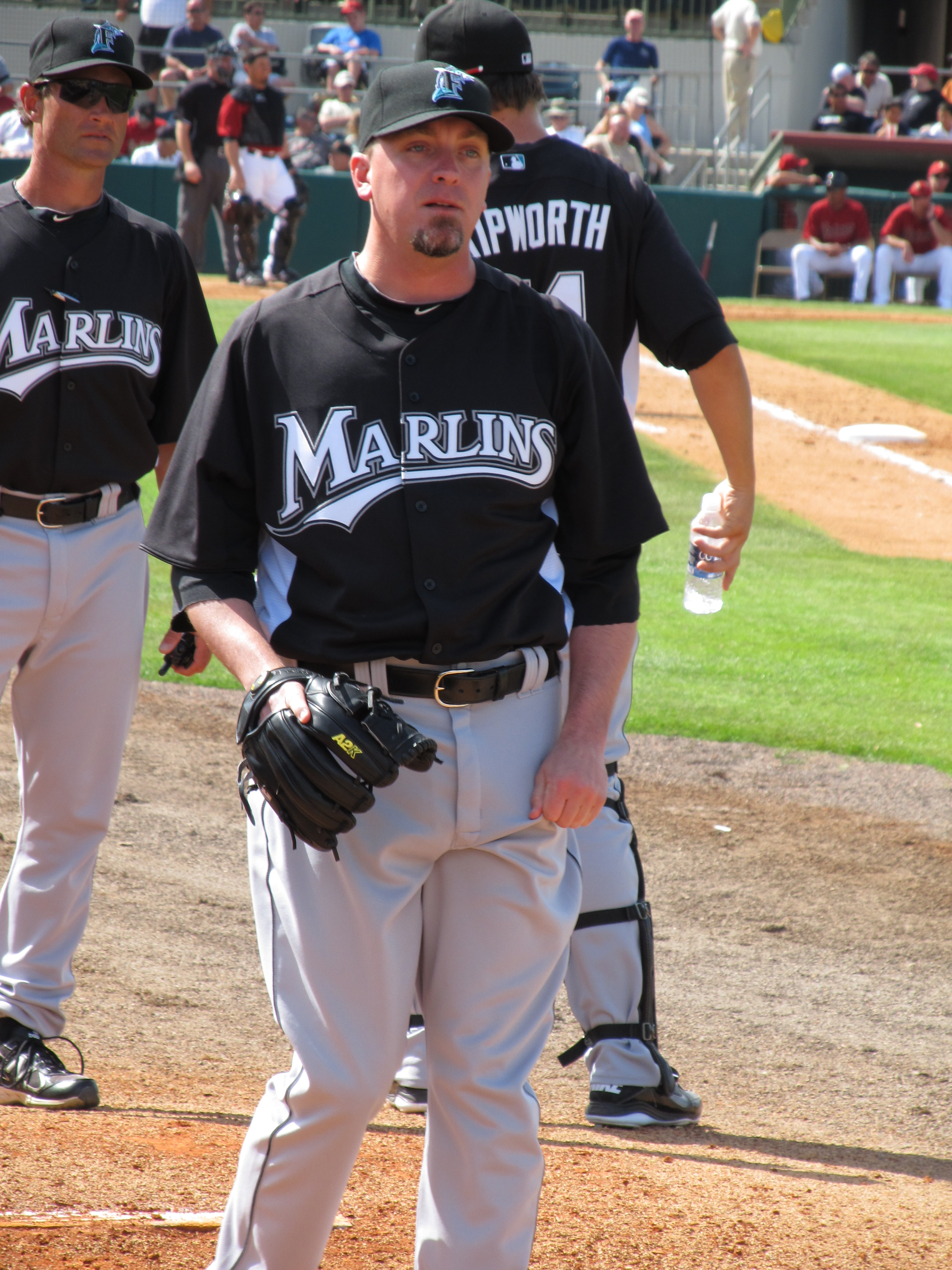
Choate with the Marlins in spring training, 2011

On December 15, 2010, Choate agreed to a two-year, $2.5 million contract with the Florida Marlins. He was 1–1 with a 2.16 ERA in 98 games over the next season and a half with the Marlins.

Between April 25 and June 13, 2011, Choate did not allow a hit in 20 consecutive appearances, surpassing the record set by Mike Myers 11 years earlier and setting a record which still stands as of 2025.

=== Los Angeles Dodgers (2012) ===
Choate was traded with Hanley Ramírez to the Los Angeles Dodgers on July 25, 2012, for Nathan Eovaldi and minor league pitcher Scott McGough. H appeared in 36 games for the Dodgers and had a 4.05 ERA in 13 1/3 innings. His combined totals for the season with the Marlins and Dodgers included 80 appearances, again leading MLB, and 38 1/3 innings pitched, (IP) making him the only player in MLB history with at least 80 appearances and fewer than 40 IP in a season.

In 2012, Choate set a record for the most games pitched in a season (80) with no decisions, beating Trever Miller's record of 76 games set just five seasons earlier in 2007. Peter Moylan came close to tying the record in 2017, but finished with 79 games pitched and 0 decisions.

=== St. Louis Cardinals (2013–15) ===
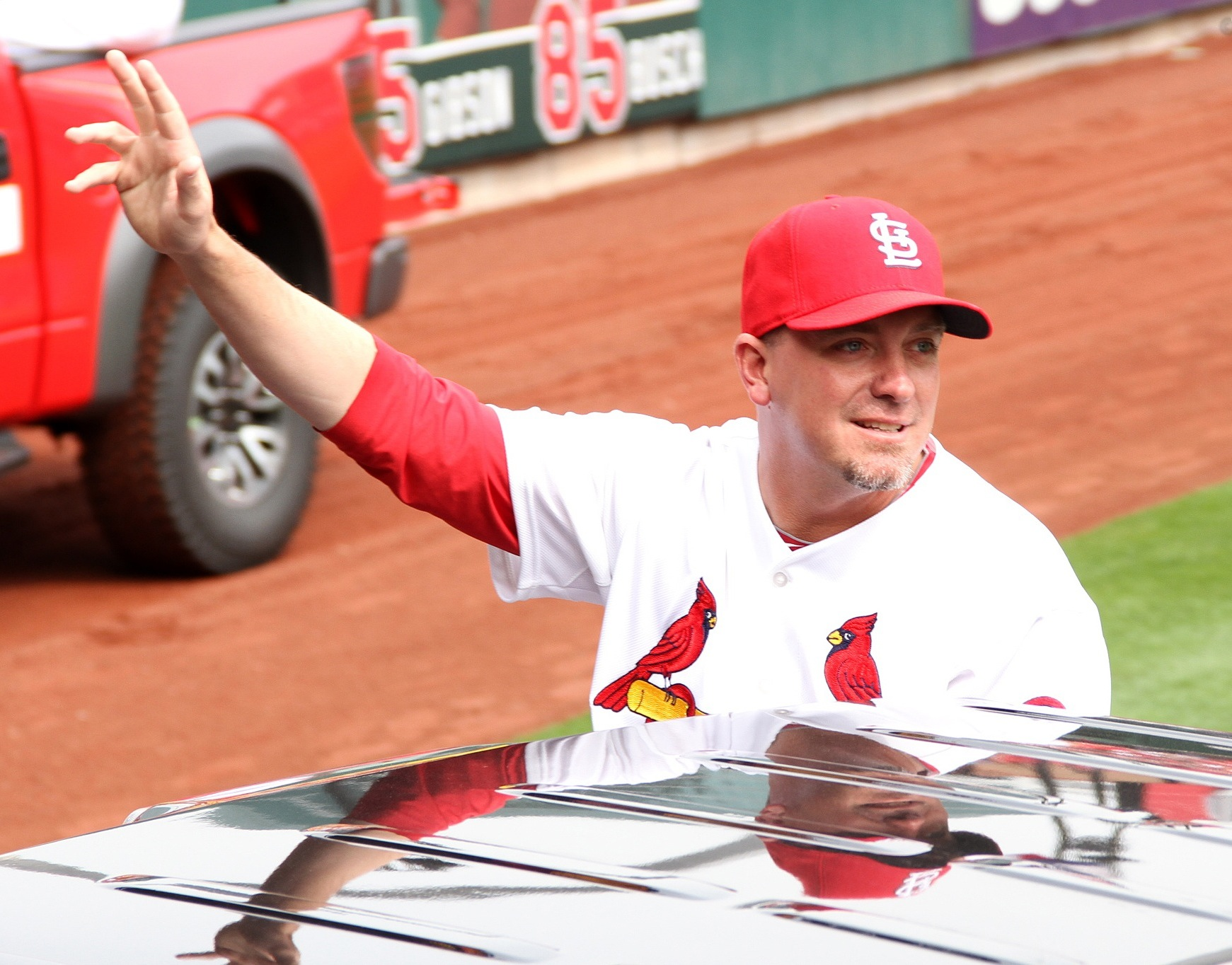
Choate at Opening Day for the St. Louis Cardinals, 2013

On December 7, 2012, Choate signed a three-year, $7.5 million contract with the St. Louis Cardinals. On May 20, 2015, he drew a walk as a hitter for the first time in his career against the New York Mets. He earned his first save with the club in a 1–0 victory over the Atlanta Braves on July 25, 2015, getting A. J. Pierzynski to ground into a game-ending double play. He became a free agent again when his contract expired after the 2015 season.

=== Toronto Blue Jays ===
On March 11, 2016, Choate signed a minor league contract with the Toronto Blue Jays. He was released on March 29.

=== Los Angeles Dodgers (second stint) ===
On June 12, 2016, Choate signed a minor league deal with the Los Angeles Dodgers. In 24 games for the Triple-A Oklahoma City Dodgers, he had a 5.56 ERA. He was released on September 1.

=== Retirement ===
On February 16, 2017, Choate announced his retirement.

== Pitching style ==
Featuring a sidearm delivery style with a repertoire of almost exclusively sinking fastballs and sliders, one of Choate's strengths was inducing ground balls from left-handed hitters with runners on base, especially for double plays. In 2011, Choate's sinker induced a ground ball rate of 75%. His slider had broad side-to-side movement, inducing a 20.26% swing-and-miss rate. Choate's fastball averaged only 86.6 mph (139.4 km/h) from 2009 to 2015, but he struck out 19.9 percent of batters faced.

Choate has been described as "the LOOGY king" and "the loogiest loogy who ever has loogied" in The Sporting News, "pretty much the prototypical LOOGY" in True Blue LA, and a "LOOGY legend" and arguably "the ultimate LOOGY" on MLB.com. For his career, 62% of all batters he faced in the majors were left handed.
