= Nick Johnson (baseball) =

American baseball player (born 1978)

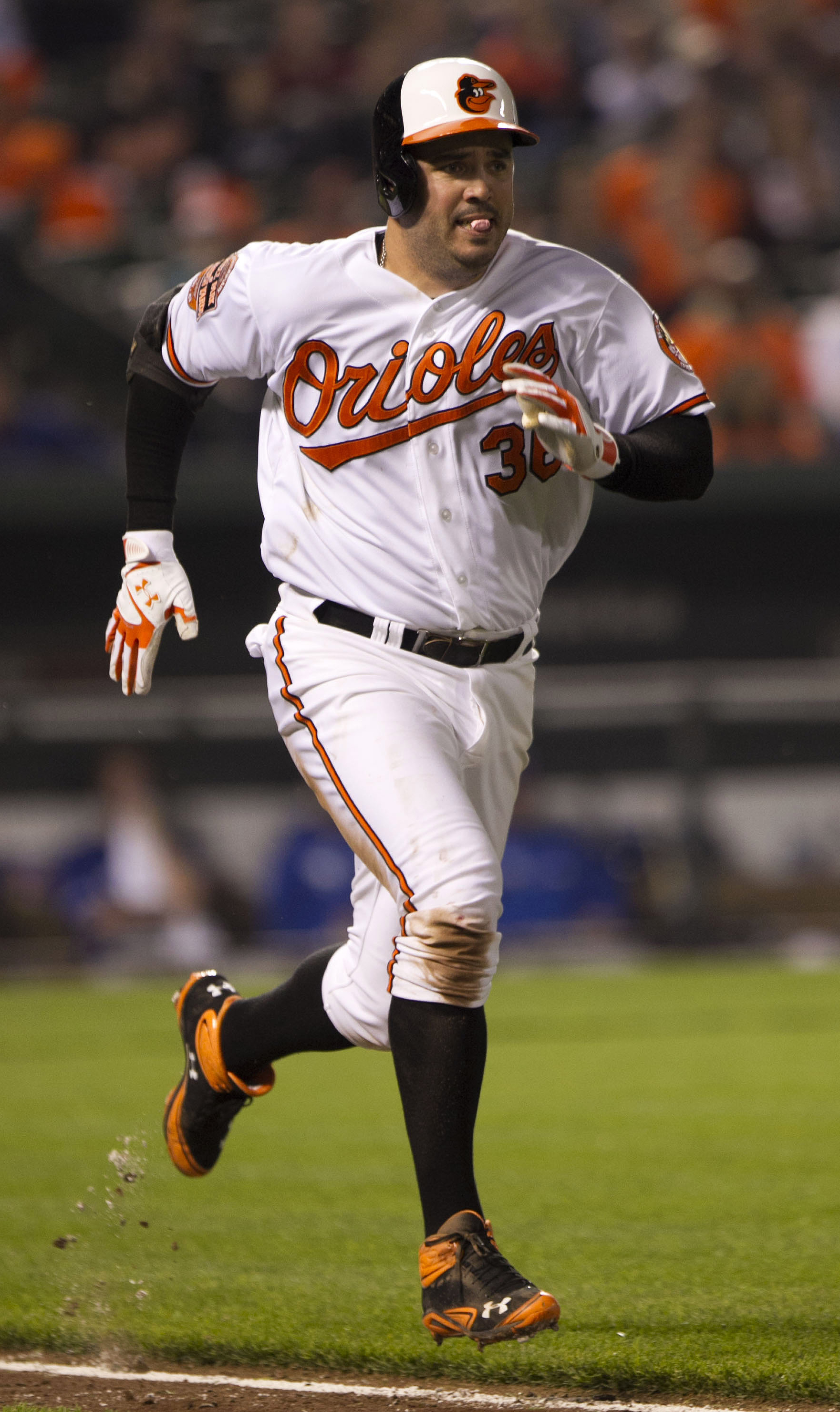
- Johnson with the Baltimore Orioles
- First baseman / Designated hitter
- Born: September 19, 1978 (age 48); Sacramento, California, U.S.
- Batted: Left Threw: Left

MLB debut
- August 21, 2001, for the New York Yankees

Last MLB appearance
- June 27, 2012, for the Baltimore Orioles

MLB statistics
- Batting average: .268
- Home runs: 95
- Runs batted in: 398
- Stats at Baseball Reference

Teams
- New York Yankees (2001–2003); Montreal Expos / Washington Nationals (2004–2006, 2008–2009); Florida Marlins (2009); New York Yankees (2010); Baltimore Orioles (2012)

Nicholas Robert Johnson (born September 19, 1978) is an American former professional baseball first baseman and designated hitter. During his career Johnson played for the New York Yankees (2001–2003; 2010), Montreal Expos/Washington Nationals (2004–2009), Florida Marlins (2009), and Baltimore Orioles (2012).

Johnson was known for his patience and discipline at the plate, which led to him having a career on-base percentage of .399. Lifetime, with the bases loaded he had a .370 batting average, a .444 on-base percentage, 72 runs batted in, and 2 grand slams in 73 at-bats. Johnson was also the last remaining player on the Nationals' roster to relocate with the team from Montreal, before being traded to the Marlins at the 2009 non-waiver trade deadline.

== Personal ==
He is the nephew of Larry Bowa. Johnson and his wife, Liz, had their first child, Brianna, on January 31, 2006. Nicholas Jr. was born in 2008 and his daughter Malia was born in 2012.

He graduated from C. K. McClatchy High School in Sacramento where he was teammates with future Major Leaguer Steve Holm. As a senior he was named to the all-state team and was named to the All-America Third Team by the American Baseball Coaches Association and Rawlings.

== Minor league career ==
Johnson was drafted by the Yankees in the third round (89th overall) of the 1996 Major League Baseball draft.

In 1998, he batted .317/.466/.538 with 17 home runs in 303 at-bats for the Tampa Yankees. In 1999, he was an All-Star for the Norwich Navigators, and batted .345/.525/.548 with 37 HBP and 123 walks in 420 official at-bats.

He participated in the 1999 and 2001 Futures Games during All-Star Weekend, playing for the United States team.

Johnson has a .446 lifetime minor league on-base percentage.

== Major League career ==
=== New York Yankees ===
In 2002, Johnson was 7th in the AL in hit by pitch (12), in just 378 at-bats with the Yankees.

Johnson hit .284/.422/.472 with the Yankees in 2003. From May 15 to July 25, Johnson was on the disabled list due to a stress fracture in his right hand. During this time, he ranked ninth among first baseman in Runs Above Replacement, position-adjusted (RARP)—a Sabermetric statistic. Only four of the hitters ahead of him (Carlos Delgado, Todd Helton, Jason Giambi, and Jim Thome) had a better EqA, and the other four played more than Johnson. Expanding beyond his position, he would have tied with Edgar Martínez for the 17th-best EqA in baseball.

After the 2003 season, the Yankees traded him, along with Juan Rivera and Randy Choate, to the Montreal Expos for Javier Vázquez.

=== Montreal Expos / Washington Nationals ===
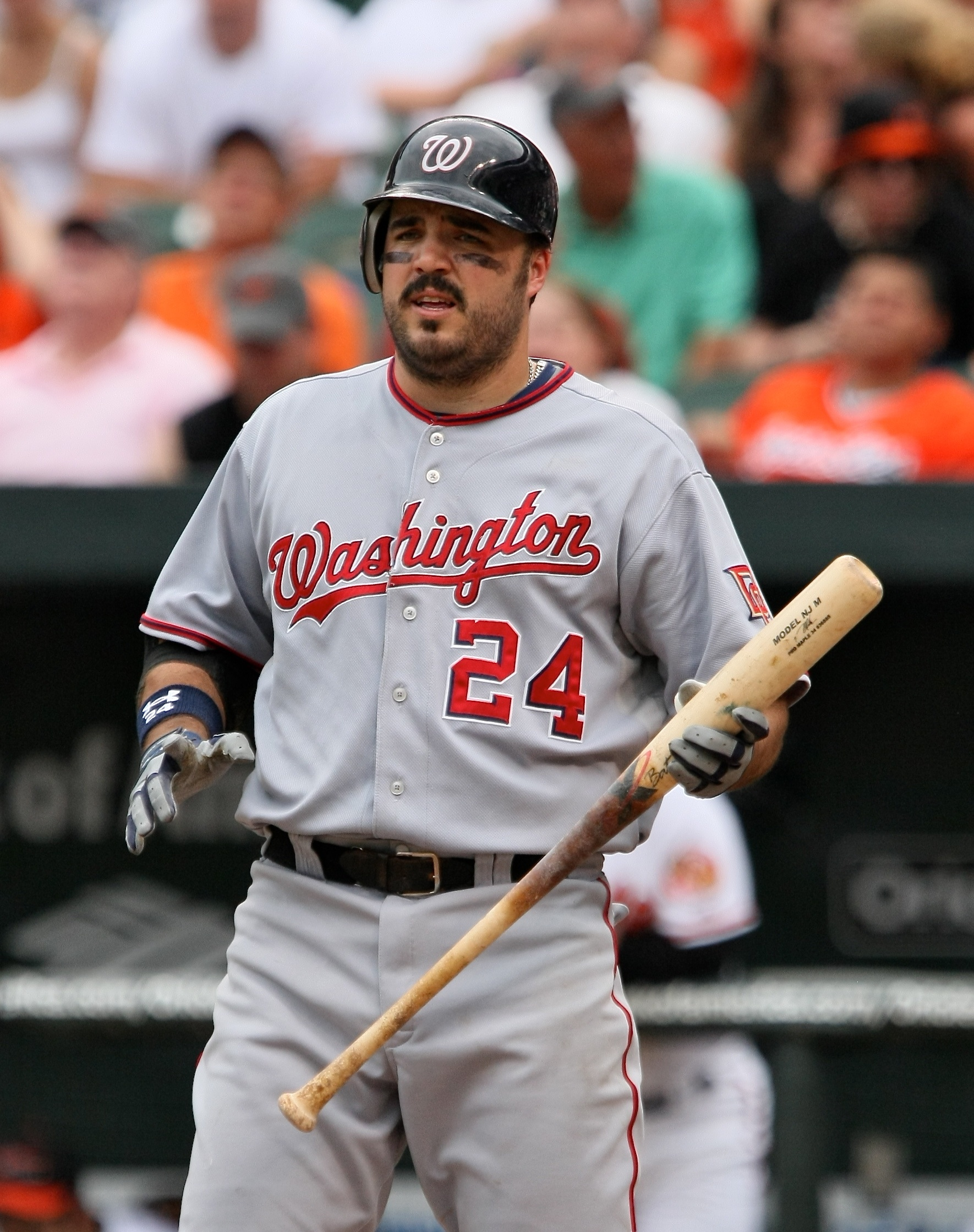
Johnson with the Nationals in 2009

In 2004, his first season (and last, because of their relocation to Washington at the end of the season) with the Expos, injuries struck again. He could not play until May 28 because of a back injury, and struggled after initial success. By the time his season was ended by a ball hit to first that took a bad hop and broke his cheekbone, he was down to a .251/.359/.398 line. The back injury was another troubling sign regarding his fragility; in addition, the year was considered a disappointment as far as his hitting was concerned.

In 2005, with the new Washington Nationals, Johnson compiled a performance more reminiscent of his 2003 season than of his injury-riddled 2004 campaign. He hit .289/.408 (sixth-best in the league)/.479, and had a .478 on-base percentage with runners in scoring position. Johnson batted fourth in the lineup for most of the season, despite the fact that he had a much higher OBP than José Guillén, the three-hole hitter.

Just before the 2006 season began, Johnson signed a three-year, $16.5 million contract extension, with a trade clause after the second year. In 2006, Johnson hit .290/.428/.520, in his best year thus far. The .428 OBP was the 4th-highest in the league. He was second in the NL in walk percentage (18.0%), third in walks (110), seventh in doubles (46) and intentional walks (15), and tenth in times hit by pitch (13). He had a .454 OBP with runners in scoring position. Johnson had his worst season to date in the field, however, with 15 errors. On September 23, 2006, playing against the New York Mets at Shea Stadium, Johnson and right fielder Austin Kearns collided while attempting to catch a fly ball. Johnson sustained a broken femur and underwent surgery that night to repair the injury. He missed the entire 2007 season, though he still earned $5.5 million.

Returning from his broken leg, Johnson played in the Nationals' spring training games in 2008. He regained his form and competed with Dmitri Young, his replacement while injured and the 2007 recipient of the NL Comeback Player of the Year Award, for the role of starting first baseman, which he won. On March 30, 2008, Johnson knocked in the first RBI in the new baseball stadium for the Nationals. However, soon after, he sustained a tear in a ligament on the ulnar side of his wrist, and missed the rest of the 2008 season.

There were rumors he might be traded before the 2009 season; however, he opened the season as the starting first baseman.

=== Florida Marlins ===
On July 31, 2009, he was traded from the Washington Nationals to the Florida Marlins for minor league pitcher Aaron Thompson. With Johnson's trade, the Nationals franchise no longer had any player on the roster who made the Montreal/Washington crossover in 2005 (although that changed again shortly after when Liván Hernández was reacquired). One of the reasons Johnson was dealt to the Marlins was because of his past history of injury.

In 2009, he walked 17.8% of the time, the highest percentage in the major leagues. His .426 on-base percentage was second-best in the league to Albert Pujols.

=== Return to New York ===
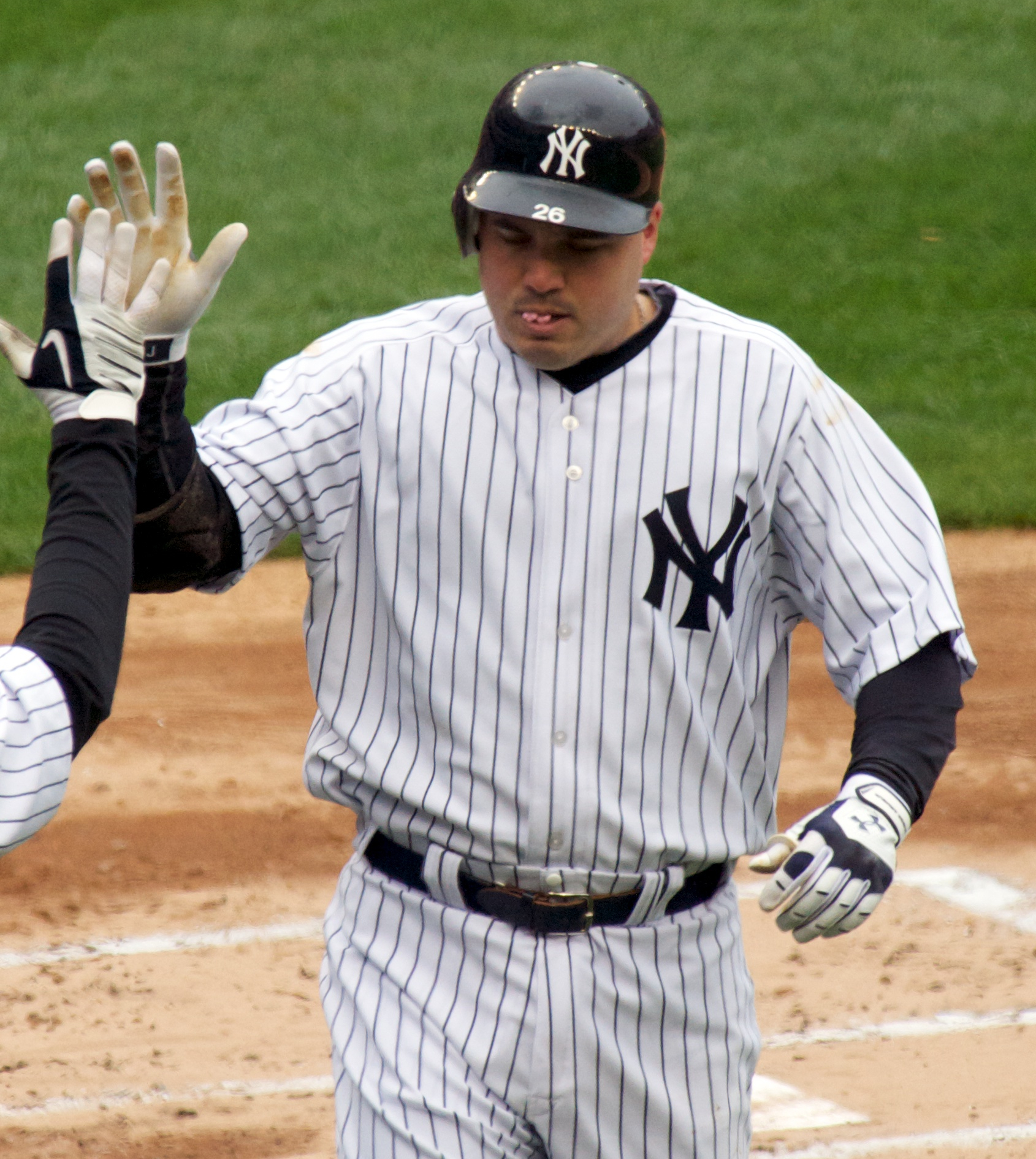
Johnson with the Yankees in 2010

On December 23, 2009, Johnson signed a one-year, $5.5 million contract to return to the Yankees. The contract also included a second-year team option. On May 8, Johnson was placed on the disabled list with a wrist injury. He required season-ending surgery after a setback in his rehabilitation in August. The Yankees declined his 2011 option, making him a free agent again.

=== Cleveland Indians ===
On March 7, 2011, Johnson signed a minor league contract with the Cleveland Indians. He spent the season in AAA with the Columbus Clippers.

=== Baltimore Orioles ===
On February 8, 2012, Johnson signed a minor league contract with the Baltimore Orioles. He attended spring training and competed for a spot on the major league roster, which he earned. He was hitless through his first 28 at-bats for the Orioles, before finally collecting a double in a game against the Yankees on May 1. He suffered a wrist injury on June 27, 2012, and did not play again for the rest of the season.

Due to long-lasting injuries sustained throughout his career, Johnson decided to retire from Major League Baseball on January 28, 2013.

Preceded by Craig Wilson	Topps Rookie All-Star First Baseman; 2002	Succeeded by Mark Teixeira
