= Matt White (baseball, born 1977) =

American baseball player

- Relief pitcher
- Born: August 19, 1977 (age 48); Pittsfield, Massachusetts, U.S.
- Batted: Right Threw: Left

MLB debut
- May 27, 2003, for the Boston Red Sox

Last MLB appearance
- August 27, 2005, for the Washington Nationals

MLB statistics
- Win–loss record: 0–2
- Earned run average: 16.76
- Strikeouts: 3
- Stats at Baseball Reference

Teams
- Boston Red Sox (2003); Seattle Mariners (2003); Washington Nationals (2005); Yokohama BayStars (2007–2008)

Matthew Joseph White (born August 19, 1977) is an American former Major League Baseball (MLB) pitcher who played for the Boston Red Sox, Seattle Mariners, and Washington Nationals between 2003 and 2005. He made news in 2007 for owning a potentially-lucrative stone quarry.

== Baseball career ==
=== Amateur ===
A native of Pittsfield, Massachusetts, White attended Wahconah Regional High School in Dalton, Massachusetts and played his college baseball at Clemson. In 1997, he played collegiate summer baseball with the Chatham A's of the Cape Cod Baseball League, where he was named a league all-star. He was first drafted by the Cleveland Indians in the 1998 amateur draft. He has been through the Rule V Draft twice. In 2002, he was drafted by the Boston Red Sox. In 2003, he was drafted by the Colorado Rockies.

=== Professional ===
White pitched in seven different organizations over nine professional seasons. He has three stints in the majors: he pitched three games for the Boston Red Sox in 2003 before being traded to the Seattle Mariners, for whom he pitched three more games in the same season. In 2005, he pitched one game for the Washington Nationals.

In seven major-league games, White pitched 9 2/3 innings with an 0-2 record. He allowed 17 hits, eight walks and 18 runs, for a 16.76 ERA and a WHIP of 2.59.

In 2006 in the minor leagues, he played for the Scranton/Wilkes-Barre Red Barons, where he played 38 games, starting 13 of them. He had a record of 7-9 with a 3.58 ERA and 69 strikeouts. He also played for the Navegantes del Magallanes in the Venezuelan Winter League, where he went 2-4 in ten starts with a 3.40 ERA and 34 strikeouts.

White was a non-roster invitee to the Los Angeles Dodgers in 2007. In spring training, he only allowed one earned run in 7 1/3 innings. However, he failed to make the major league roster and was optioned to the Las Vegas 51s, the Dodgers Triple-A team. He was 2-4 with a 3.83 ERA in 40 games out of the bullpen for the 51s during the 1st half of the 2007 Pacific Coast League season.

On June 25, 2007, he asked for, and was granted, his release from the 51s so that he could sign a contract to play baseball in Japan. He signed with the Yokohama BayStars. He was released on August 15, 2008.

The Uni-President 7-Eleven Lions of the Chinese Professional Baseball League in Taiwan signed White ahead of the 2010 season. However, he did not pitch in Taiwan, later playing that year for the Pittsfield Colonials in the independent Can-Am League.

== Rock discovery ==
In 2003, White purchased 50 acres (200,000 m^{2}) of mountain real estate in Cummington, Massachusetts from his aunt for $50,000, giving her the money she needed to enter a nursing home. His original intention was to build his home, but he found the land to be too hard. When he called a surveyor out to inspect the land, the surveyor found that the land was a type of mica schist estimated to be about 400 million years old. Estimates have placed the low estimate of the find at 24 million tons. At current prices (he has been selling the stone for over $100/ton), it is estimated to be worth around $2.5 billion, minus extraction costs.

White has begun a small-scale extraction operation, Swift River Stone, and made $600,000 in 2006. He has expressed interest in selling the land, and believes he will get "several million dollars."

When a story broke on most sports news outlets about him on February 28, 2007, some of his teammates in spring training started referring to him in the clubhouse as "Mr. Billionaire." White put the land up for sale in 2009, but was actively working on it in 2013.
