= Travis Hughes =

American baseball player (born 1978)

- Pitcher
- Born: May 25, 1978 (age 48); Newton, Kansas, U.S.
- Batted: Right Threw: Right

MLB debut
- September 26, 2004, for the Texas Rangers

Last MLB appearance
- August 20, 2006, for the Washington Nationals

MLB statistics
- Win–loss record: 1–1
- Earned run average: 6.31
- Strikeouts: 16
- Stats at Baseball Reference

Former teams
- Texas Rangers (2004); Washington Nationals (2005–2006); Yokohama BayStars (2008)

Travis Wade Hughes (born May 25, 1978) is an American former professional baseball relief pitcher. He played in Major League Baseball (MLB) for the Texas Rangers (2004) and Washington Nationals (2005-2006).

In his three-season career in the major leagues, Hughes has posted a 6.31 ERA with 16 strikeouts in 25.2 innings pitched.

Hughes became a free agent after the 2006 season. The Boston Red Sox organization signed him to a minor league contract on December 20, 2006, and invited him to participate in the Red Sox' 2007 spring training. Hughes spent the year as the closer for the Red Sox's Triple-A affiliate, the Pawtucket Red Sox. Hughes had 24 saves and an ERA of 1.91. Hughes signed with the Yokohama BayStars of Japan's Central League for the 2008 season to serve as their closer. He was released on August 15, 2008.

A 2006 single in his only at-bat left Hughes with a rare MLB career batting average of 1.000.

Hughes last pitched for the York Revolution of the Atlantic League.
