= Brian Moehler =

American baseball player (born 1971)

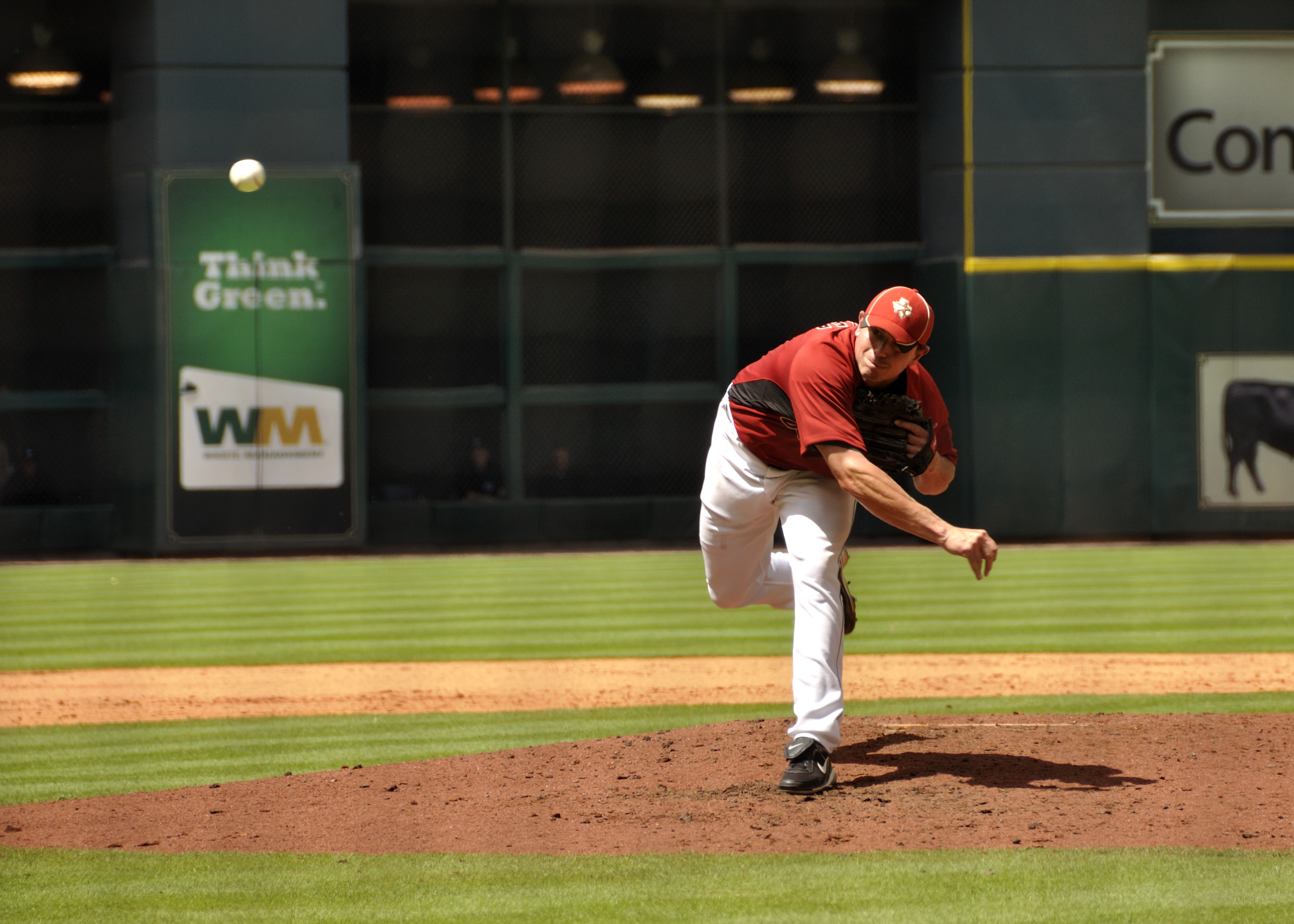
- Moehler in April 2010
- Pitcher
- Born: December 31, 1971 (age 54); Rockingham, North Carolina, U.S.
- Batted: Right Threw: Right

MLB debut
- September 22, 1996, for the Detroit Tigers

Last MLB appearance
- July 7, 2010, for the Houston Astros

MLB statistics
- Win–loss record: 84–107
- Earned run average: 4.81
- Strikeouts: 859
- Stats at Baseball Reference

Teams
- Detroit Tigers (1996–2002); Cincinnati Reds (2002); Houston Astros (2003); Florida Marlins (2005–2006); Houston Astros (2007–2010)

Brian Merritt Moehler (born December 31, 1971) is an American former starting pitcher who played in Major League Baseball (MLB) for 15 seasons.

Moehler pitched for the University of North Carolina at Greensboro. He was selected by the Detroit Tigers in the sixth round of the 1993 draft, and assigned to the Niagara Falls Rapids. After the 1993 season, Moehler moved on to the Jacksonville Suns, where he pitched until late 1996, when he was called up by the Tigers.

Moehler made his major league debut in 1996, pitching in 2 games for the Tigers. In 1997, Moehler went 11–12 in 31 starts, the following year he would have his best season of his career, going 14–13 with a 3.90 ERA and 4 complete games, including 3 shutouts. In 1999, he led the American league in losses with 16. In 1999, during his stint with Detroit, he was caught scuffing the baseball against the Tampa Bay Devil Rays, and was suspended for 10 games. He would rebound in the year 2000, going 12–9 for Detroit. 2001 and 2002 Moehler pitched just a combined 4 starts due to injury, he would later be traded in 2002 to the Cincinnati Reds. He was the starting pitcher for the Tigers' inaugural game at Comerica Park in 2000. During his stint with the Tigers, he won both the last game at the old Tiger Stadium and the first game at the new Comerica Park.

In 2003, Moehler signed with the Houston Astros but pitched in just 3 games. After taking the 2004 season off, Moehler came back in 2005 pitching for the Florida Marlins. He went 13–23 in two seasons with the Marlins, bouncing between the bullpen and the rotation.

On January 19, 2007, Moehler signed a one-year contract with the Houston Astros; at the end of spring training he earned a relief spot on the roster. On August 2, 2007, Moehler achieved his first save in a Major League game against the Atlanta Braves.

On November 4, 2012, Moehler was hired as a Georgia area scout for the Boston Red Sox.
