= John Patterson (pitcher) =

American baseball player (born 1978)

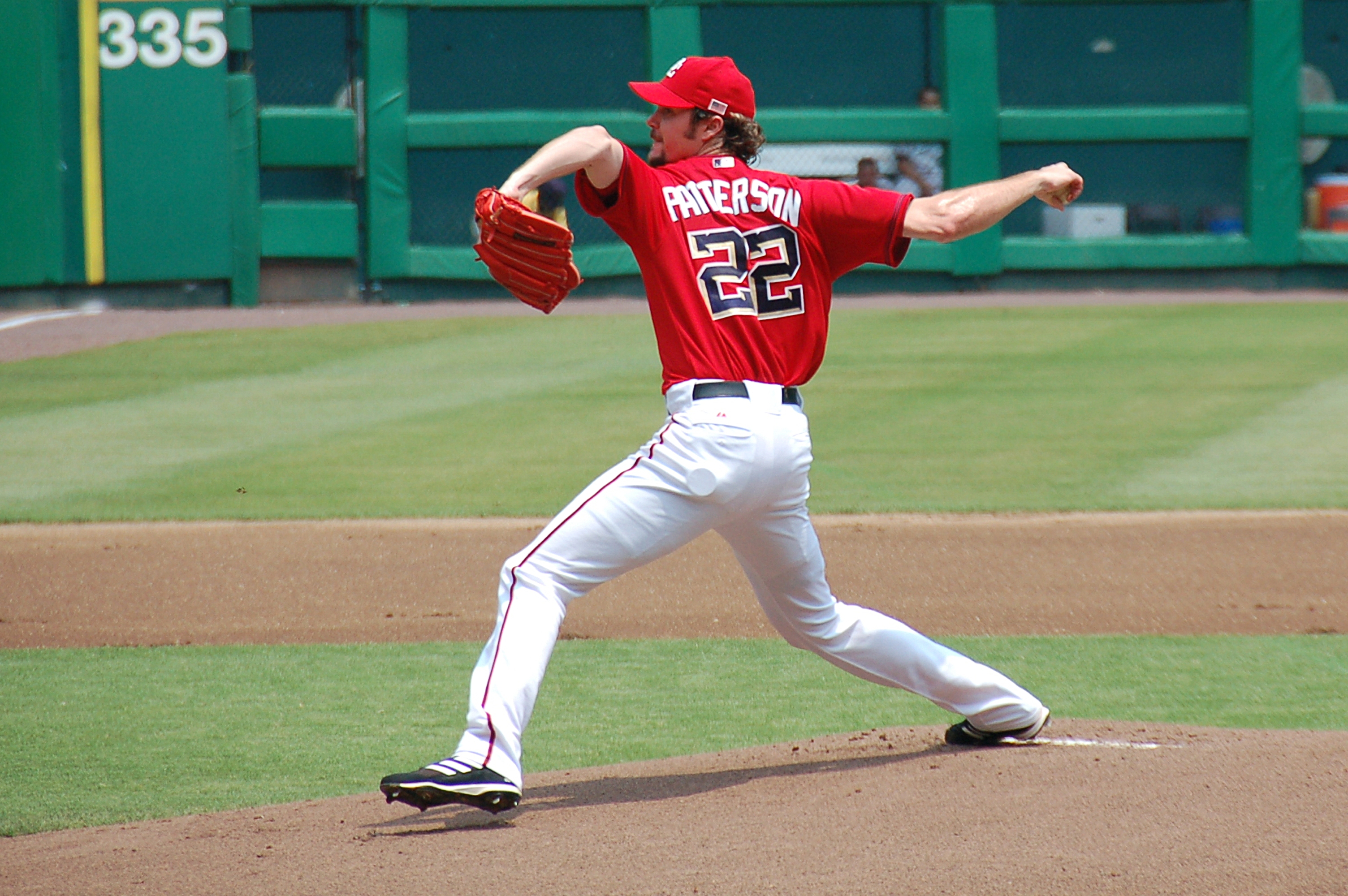
- Patterson with the Washington Nationals in 2006
- Pitcher
- Born: January 30, 1978 (age 47); Orange, Texas, U.S.
- Batted: Right Threw: Right

MLB debut
- July 20, 2002, for the Arizona Diamondbacks

Last MLB appearance
- May 5, 2007, for the Washington Nationals

MLB statistics
- Win–loss record: 18–25
- Earned run average: 4.32
- Strikeouts: 415
- Stats at Baseball Reference

Teams
- Arizona Diamondbacks (2002–2003); Montreal Expos / Washington Nationals (2004–2007)
Medals
Men's baseball
Representing United States
Pan American Games
Silver medal – second place	1999 Winnipeg	Team competition

John Hollis Patterson (born January 30, 1978) is an American former professional baseball pitcher. He played for the Arizona Diamondbacks and Montreal Expos/Washington Nationals of Major League Baseball (MLB) from 2002 to 2007.

== Career ==
A USA Today prep All-American in his senior year at West Orange-Stark (Texas) High School, Patterson was drafted by the Montreal Expos in the first round (5th overall pick) of the 1996 MLB draft. Montreal lost the draft rights to Patterson on a legal technicality: they sent him a contract offer that was not printed on official team letterhead, and he signed with the Arizona Diamondbacks for $6.075 million. After a solid 2002 rookie season where he had a 3.22 earned run average (ERA), he had a disappointing 2003 season with the Diamondbacks. Patterson was traded back to the Expos prior to the 2004 season in exchange for Randy Choate, a left-handed relief pitcher.

Always filled with immense potential – he featured a fastball in the mid-90s (miles per hour) along with a big curveball and a sharp slider – Patterson started to realize it while pitching for Montreal in 2004, when he had a 3.57 ERA in April. He got hurt soon after, though, and never regained his form for the rest of the year.

Patterson had a breakout season in 2005, posting a 9–7 record for Washington while setting career bests in ERA (3.13), innings pitched (198.3), and strikeouts (185) in 31 starts. His 15 no decisions were the most among MLB starting pitchers in 2005. On August 4, 2005, he pitched his first career complete game shutout against the Los Angeles Dodgers, with Washington winning 7–0. In 2009, Washington Post baseball writer Dave Sheinin named Patterson's performance the greatest pitching performance in Nationals history at that time.

Early in 2006, Patterson suffered an injury to his right forearm which had to be surgically repaired on July 20, and he did not return for the 2006 campaign.

In 2007, Patterson started the year dismally, going 1–5 in seven starts with an ERA of 7.47. His struggles with right forearm and nerve problems that had begun in 2006 continued. He went back on the disabled list on May 7, 2007, with elbow inflammation. He did not pitch the rest of the season, eventually opting for surgery in September 2007. On March 20, 2008, the Nationals released him after four years with the franchise.

On March 24, 2008, Patterson signed a minor league contract with the Texas Rangers. He was released on May 24, 2008. Unable to overcome the pain in his right forearm, he announced his retirement from baseball on January 7, 2009.

== Personal life ==
Patterson lives in Prosper, TX. On November 10, 2007, he married 2005 Miss District of Columbia Shannon Schambeau, who was fourth runner-up in the 2006 Miss America pageant. In 2010 Mrs. Patterson won the Mrs. Texas title associated with the Mrs. America competition.

Preceded by Liván Hernández	Washington Nationals Opening Day starting pitcher 2007	Succeeded by Odalis Pérez
