= J. J. Davis =

American baseball player (born 1978)

- Outfielder
- Born: October 25, 1978 (age 47); Glendora, California, U.S.
- Batted: Right Threw: Right

MLB debut
- September 4, 2002, for the Pittsburgh Pirates

Last MLB appearance
- May 8, 2005, for the Washington Nationals

MLB statistics
- Batting average: .179
- Home runs: 1
- Runs batted in: 9
- Stats at Baseball Reference

Teams
- Pittsburgh Pirates (2002–2004); Washington Nationals (2005)

Jerry C. "J. J." Davis (born October 25, 1978) is an American former professional baseball outfielder. He played during four seasons in Major League Baseball (MLB) for the Pittsburgh Pirates and Washington Nationals. He was drafted by the Pirates in the 1st round (8th pick) of the 1997 Major League Baseball draft. Davis played his first professional season with their Rookie league GCL Pirates in 1997, and his last with the Colorado Rockies' Triple-A club, the Colorado Springs Sky Sox, in 2005. Davis attended Baldwin Park High school.
