= Héctor Carrasco =

Dominican baseball player (born 1969)

- Pitcher
- Born: October 22, 1969 (age 56); San Pedro de Macoris, Dominican Republic
- Batted: Right Threw: Right

Professional debut
- MLB: April 4, 1994, for the Cincinnati Reds
- NPB: March 27, 2004, for the Osaka Kintetsu Buffaloes

Last appearance
- NPB: September 22, 2004, for the Osaka Kintetsu Buffaloes
- MLB: June 30, 2007, for the Los Angeles Angels of Anaheim

MLB statistics
- Win–loss record: 44–50
- Earned run average: 4.00
- Strikeouts: 662

NPB statistics
- Win–loss record: 8–8
- Earned run average: 5.57
- Strikeouts: 70
- Stats at Baseball Reference

Teams
- Cincinnati Reds (1994–1997); Kansas City Royals (1997); Minnesota Twins (1998–2000); Boston Red Sox (2000); Minnesota Twins (2001); Baltimore Orioles (2003); Osaka Kintetsu Buffaloes (2004); Washington Nationals (2005); Los Angeles Angels of Anaheim (2006–2007)

Héctor Pacheco Carrasco (born October 22, 1969) is a Dominican former professional baseball relief pitcher. He played in Major League Baseball (MLB) for the Cincinnati Reds, Kansas City Royals, Minnesota Twins, Boston Red Sox, Baltimore Orioles, Washington Nationals, and Los Angeles Angels of Anaheim. He also played in Nippon Professional Baseball (NPB) for the Kintetsu Buffaloes. He bats and throws right-handed.

In a twelve-season career, Carrasco has posted a 44–50 record with 19 saves and a 3.99 ERA in 637 relief appearances and ten starts.

== Career ==
Carrasco began his major league career with the Cincinnati Reds in 1994, and has also pitched for the Kansas City Royals, Minnesota Twins, Boston Red Sox, Baltimore Orioles, Washington Nationals, and Los Angeles Angels of Anaheim. On April 15, 2000, while pitching for the Twins, Hector gave up Cal Ripken's 3000th hit in a game at the Hubert H. Humphrey Metrodome. His most productive season came in 2005 for the Nationals, when he was 5–4 with a 2.04 ERA in 64 appearances, allowing only 59 hits in 88 1/3 innings and limiting opponents to a .193 batting average. He was 4–3 with a 2.04 ERA in 62.2 innings as a reliever, and 1–1 with a 2.03 ERA in 27 2.3 innings while starting five games near the season's end.

In 2004, Carrasco pitched for the Kintetsu Buffaloes of Japan's Pacific League, going 8–8 with five saves and a 5.57 ERA in 53 relief appearances. He began the 2005 season at the then Washington Nationals' Triple-A affiliate, New Orleans Zephyrs, where he was 1–0 with four saves in eight games without allowing an earned run, before being called up and having a terrific year for the Nats. He made 64 appearances (10th in the league), primarily as the set up man for closer Chad Cordero, pitching 88 1/3 innings, with an ERA of just 2.04, although he also started five games. His WHIP (BB + H per IP) was 1.098, which would have been good enough for fifth in the league had he had the requisite number of innings pitched.

Following the 2005 season, Carrasco filed for free agency, and was signed by the Angels to a $6.1 million, two-year contract. In 2006, Carrasco was 7–3 with a 3.41 ERA in 56 appearances, three as a starter. But in 2007, after 29 appearances where he posted an ERA of 6.57, and allowing 8 HR's in 38 1/3 innings, he was released. The following week, Carrasco returned to the Nationals organization by signing a minor league contract. On Jan. 24, 2008, Carrasco signed a minor-league contract with an invitation to spring training with the Pirates. He was released on March 26, 2008. In early May, he signed a minor league contract with the Chicago Cubs. He became a free agent at the end of the season.

In 2009 Carrasco played in the Atlantic League for the Newark Bears, the Long Island Ducks and the Bridgeport Bluefish.

Carrasco played with the Shreveport-Bossier Captains of the American Association of Independent Professional Baseball during the 2010 season. He played for the club in 2011 as well.
