= 2005 Milwaukee Brewers season =

2005 Milwaukee Brewers
- League: National League
- Division: Central
- Ballpark: Miller Park
- City: Milwaukee, Wisconsin
- Record: 81–81 (.500)
- Divisional place: 3rd
- Owners: Mark Attanasio
- General managers: Doug Melvin
- Managers: Ned Yost
- Television: FSN Wisconsin (Daron Sutton, Bill Schroeder)
- Radio: WTMJ (AM) (Bob Uecker, Jim Powell)

The 2005 Milwaukee Brewers season was the 36th season for the Brewers in Milwaukee. They finished third in the National League Central. This was the Brewers’ first non-losing season since 1992, and marked a return to relevance as the Brewers qualified for the playoffs in nine of the ensuing 20 seasons — and finished better than .500 in thirteen of those seasons.

== Offseason ==
- December 13, 2004: Scott Podsednik was traded by the Milwaukee Brewers with a player to be named later and Luis Vizcaíno to the Chicago White Sox for Carlos Lee. The Milwaukee Brewers sent Travis Hinton (minors) (January 10, 2005) to the Chicago White Sox to complete the trade.
- January 21, 2005: Ricky Bottalico was signed as a free agent with the Milwaukee Brewers.
- March 29, 2005: Brooks Kieschnick was released by the Milwaukee Brewers.

== Regular season ==
=== Opening Day starters ===
- Russell Branyan
- Brady Clark
- Doug Davis
- J. J. Hardy
- Geoff Jenkins
- Carlos Lee
- Damian Miller
- Lyle Overbay
- Junior Spivey
- Ben Sheets

=== Season standings ===
==== National League Central ====
NL Central
Team	W	L	Pct.	GB	Home	Road
St. Louis Cardinals	100	62	.617	—	50‍–‍31	50‍–‍31
Houston Astros	89	73	.549	11	53‍–‍28	36‍–‍45
Milwaukee Brewers	81	81	.500	19	46‍–‍35	35‍–‍46
Chicago Cubs	79	83	.488	21	38‍–‍43	41‍–‍40
Cincinnati Reds	73	89	.451	27	42‍–‍39	31‍–‍50
Pittsburgh Pirates	67	95	.414	33	34‍–‍47	33‍–‍48

==== Record vs. opponents ====
2005 National League record Source: MLB Standings Grid – 2005
Team	AZ	ATL	CHC	CIN	COL	FLA	HOU	LAD	MIL	NYM	PHI	PIT	SD	SF	STL	WAS	AL
Arizona	—	3–3	5–2	2–4	11–7	2–4	3–3	13–5	2–4	1–6	3–4	3–4	10–9	7–11	2–5	2–4	8–10
Atlanta	3–3	—	6–1	7–3	2–4	10–8	5–1	3–3	3–3	13–6	9–10	4–3	1–5	4–2	3–3	10–9	7–8
Chicago	2–5	1–6	—	6–9	4–3	5–4	9–7	4–2	7–9	2–4	2–4	11–5	4–3	5–2	10–6	1–5	6–9
Cincinnati	4–2	3–7	9–6	—	3–3	2–4	4–12	3–4	6–10	3–3	3–4	9–7	4–2	3–5	5–11	5–1	7-8
Colorado	7–11	4–2	3–4	3–3	—	3–3	1–5	11–8	1–5	3–4	2–4	3–7	7–11	7–11	4–4	2–4	6–9
Florida	4–2	8–10	4–5	4–2	3–3	—	4–3	5–2	3–4	8–10	9–10	3–4	2–4	4–2	3–4	9–9	10–5
Houston	3–3	1–5	7–9	12–4	5–1	3-4	—	4–2	10–5	5–5	6–0	9–7	4–3	3–4	5–11	5–2	7–8
Los Angeles	5–13	3–3	2–4	4–3	8–11	2–5	2–4	—	5–1	3–3	3–3	5–2	11–7	9–10	2–5	2–4	5–13
Milwaukee	4–2	3–3	9–7	10–6	5–1	4–3	5–10	1–5	—	3–3	4–5	9–7	3–4	4–3	5–11	4–4	8–7
New York	6–1	6–13	4–2	3–3	4–3	10–8	5–5	3–3	3–3	—	11–7	3–3	4–2	3–3	2–5	11–8	5–10
Philadelphia	4-3	10–9	4–2	4–3	4–2	10–9	0–6	3–3	5–4	7–11	—	4–3	6–0	5–1	4–2	11–8	7–8
Pittsburgh	4–3	3–4	5–11	7–9	7–3	4–3	7–9	2–5	7–9	3–3	3–4	—	3–4	2–4	4–12	1–5	5–7
San Diego	9–10	5–1	3–4	2–4	11–7	4–2	3–4	7–11	4–3	2–4	0–6	4–3	—	12–6	4–3	5–1	7–11
San Francisco	11–7	2–4	2–5	5–3	11–7	2–4	4–3	10–9	3–4	3–3	1–5	4–2	6–12	—	2–4	3–3	6–12
St. Louis	5–2	3–3	6–10	11–5	4–4	4-3	11–5	5–2	11–5	5–2	2–4	12–4	3–4	4–2	—	4–2	10–5
Washington	4–2	9–10	5–1	1–5	4–2	9-9	2–5	4–2	4–4	8–11	8–11	5–1	1–5	3–3	2–4	—	12–6

=== Transactions ===
- May 27, 2005: Tim Crabtree was released by the Milwaukee Brewers.
- July 27, 2005: Ricky Bottalico was released by the Milwaukee Brewers.

=== Roster ===
2005 Milwaukee Brewers
Roster
Pitchers: 46 Mike Adams; 52 Ricky Bottalico; 52 José Capellán; 39 Chris Capuano; 49 Doug Davis; 51 Kane Davis; 47 Jorge de la Rosa; 37 Dana Eveland; 58 Gary Glover; 30 Rick Helling; 43 Justin Lehr; 33 Wes Obermueller; 55 Tomo Ohka; 41 Tommy Phelps; 48 Julio Santana; 53 Víctor Santos; 15 Ben Sheets; 59 Derrick Turnbow; 38 Matt Wise	Catchers: 26 Damian Miller; 21 Chad Moeller; Infielders: 31 Russell Branyan; 6 Jeff Cirillo; 22 Trent Durrington; 28 Prince Fielder; 2 Bill Hall; 7 J. J. Hardy; 18 Wes Helms; 11 Lyle Overbay; 37 Junior Spivey; 23 Rickie Weeks	Outfielders: 27 Brady Clark; 8 Nelson Cruz; 1 Corey Hart; 5 Geoff Jenkins; 10 Dave Krynzel; 45 Carlos Lee; 24 Chris Magruder; Other batters: 29 Julio Mosquera	Manager: 3 Ned Yost; Coaches: 35 Bill Castro (Bullpen); 25 Rich Dauer (bench); 45 Rich Donnelly (third base); 36 Mike Maddux (pitching); 14 Dave Nelson (first base); 16 Butch Wynegar (hitting)

== Player stats ==
=== Batting ===
Note: G = Games played; AB = At bats; R = Runs; H = Hits; 2B = Doubles; 3B = Triples; HR = Home runs; RBI = Runs batted in; SB = Stolen bases; BB = Walks; AVG = Batting average; SLG = Slugging average

Player	G	AB	R	H	2B	3B	HR	RBI	SB	BB	AVG	SLG
Carlos Lee	162	618	85	164	41	0	32	114	13	57	.265	.487
Brady Clark	145	599	94	183	31	1	13	53	10	47	.306	.426
Geoff Jenkins	148	538	87	157	42	1	25	86	0	56	.292	.513
Lyle Overbay	158	537	80	148	34	1	19	72	1	78	.276	.449
Bill Hall	146	501	69	146	39	6	17	62	18	39	.291	.495
Damian Miller	114	385	50	105	25	1	9	43	0	37	.273	.413
J.J. Hardy	124	372	46	92	22	1	9	50	0	44	.247	.384
Rickie Weeks Jr.	96	360	56	86	13	2	13	42	15	40	.239	.394
Russell Branyan	85	202	23	52	11	0	12	31	1	39	.257	.490
Chad Moeller	66	199	23	41	9	1	7	23	0	13	.206	.367
Jeff Cirillo	77	185	29	52	15	0	4	23	4	23	.281	.427
Junior Spivey	49	182	22	43	8	1	5	17	7	18	.236	.374
Wes Helms	95	168	18	50	13	1	4	24	0	14	.298	.458
Chris Magruder	101	138	16	28	9	0	2	13	3	7	.203	.312
Prince Fielder	39	59	2	17	4	0	2	10	0	2	.288	.458
Corey Hart	21	57	9	11	2	1	2	7	2	6	.193	.368
Trent Durrington	28	14	3	3	1	0	0	2	5	1	.214	.286
Dave Krynzel	5	7	0	0	0	0	0	0	0	0	.000	.000
Nelson Cruz	8	5	1	1	1	0	0	0	0	2	.200	.400
Julio Mosquera	1	1	0	0	0	0	0	0	0	0	.000	.000
Pitcher totals	162	321	13	34	7	2	0	17	0	8	.106	.140
Team totals	162	5448	726	1413	327	19	175	689	79	531	.259	.423

=== Pitching ===
Note: W = Wins; L = Losses; ERA = Earned run average; G = Games pitched; GS = Games started; SV = Saves; IP = Innings pitched; H = Hits allowed; R = Runs allowed; ER = Earned runs allowed; BB = Walks allowed; SO = Strikeouts

Player	W	L	ERA	G	GS	SV	IP	H	R	ER	BB	SO
Doug Davis	11	11	3.84	35	35	0	222.2	196	103	95	93	208
Chris Capuano	18	12	3.99	35	35	0	219.0	212	105	97	91	176
Ben Sheets	10	9	3.33	22	22	0	156.2	142	66	58	25	141
Víctor Santos	4	13	4.57	29	24	0	141.2	153	87	72	60	89
Tomo Ohka	7	6	4.35	22	20	0	126.1	145	65	61	28	81
Derrick Turnbow	7	1	1.74	69	0	39	67.1	49	15	13	24	64
Wes Obermueller	1	4	5.26	23	8	0	65.0	74	41	35	36	33
Gary Glover	5	4	5.57	15	11	0	64.2	74	41	40	20	58
Matt Wise	4	4	3.36	49	0	1	64.1	37	25	24	25	62
Rick Helling	3	1	2.39	15	7	0	49.0	39	13	13	18	42
Jorge De La Rosa	2	2	4.46	38	0	0	42.1	48	23	21	38	42
Julio Santana	3	5	4.50	41	0	1	42.0	34	21	21	19	49
Ricky Bottalico	2	2	4.54	40	0	2	41.2	43	24	21	19	29
Justin Lehr	1	1	3.89	23	0	0	34.2	32	19	15	18	23
Dana Eveland	1	1	5.97	27	0	1	31.2	40	21	21	18	23
Tommy Phelps	0	2	4.63	29	0	1	23.1	25	12	12	12	14
Kane Davis	1	1	2.70	15	0	0	16.2	10	6	5	10	11
José Capellán	1	1	2.87	17	0	0	15.2	17	6	5	5	14
Mike Adams	0	1	2.70	13	0	1	13.1	12	4	4	10	14
Team totals	81	81	3.97	162	162	46	1438.0	1382	697	635	569	1173

== Awards and records ==
2005 Major League Baseball All-Star Game

- Carlos Lee, outfield, reserve

== Farm system ==
The Brewers' farm system consisted of six minor league affiliates in 2005. The Nashville Sounds won the Pacific Coast League championship.

Level	Team	League	Manager
Triple-A	Nashville Sounds	Pacific Coast League	Frank Kremblas
Double-A	Huntsville Stars	Southern League	Don Money
Class A-Advanced	Brevard County Manatees	Florida State League	John Tamargo
Class A	West Virginia Power	South Atlantic League	Ramón Avilés
Rookie	Helena Brewers	Pioneer League	Ed Sedar
Rookie	AZL Brewers	Arizona League	Mike Guerrero

== Game log ==
Game Log

April (10-13)
#	Date	Opponent	Score	Win	Loss	Save	Attendance	Record
1	April 4	@ Pirates	9–2	Sheets (1-0)	Pérez (0-1)		38,016	1-0
2	April 6	@ Pirates	10–2	Davis (1-0)	Wells (0-1)		12,077	2-0
3	April 8	@ Cubs	6–3 (12)	de la Rosa (1-0)	Leicester (0-1)	Adams (1)	39,892	3-0
4	April 9	@ Cubs	0–4	Zambrano (0-1)	Sheets (0-1)		38,743	3-1
5	April 10	@ Cubs	5–6 (12)	Rusch (2-0)	Turnbow (0-1)		39,076	3-2
6	April 11	Pirates	6–2	Davis (2-0)	Wells (0-2)		42,458	4-2
7	April 12	Pirates	2–4	Redman (1-0)	Glover (0-1)	Mesa (3)	10,927	4-3
8	April 13	Pirates	6–2	de la Rosa (2-0)	White (0-2)		11,021	5-3
9	April 15	Cardinals	0–3	Suppan (1-1)	Sheets (1-2)	Isringhausen (3)	22,676	5-4
10	April 16	Cardinals	3–5	Carpenter (2-1)	Davis (2-1)	Isringhausen (4)	30,732	5-5
11	April 17	Cardinals	2–3	Marquis (2-0)	Adams (0-1)	Isringhausen (5)	21,144	5-6
12	April 18	Dodgers	3–7	Pérez (3-0)	Capuano (0-1)		11,728	5-7
13	April 19	Dodgers	6–8 (10)	Carrara (2-0)	Phelps (0-1)	Brazobán (3)	11,029	5-8
14	April 20	@ Astros	1–6	Oswalt (3-1)	Sheets (1-3)		26,119	5-9
15	April 21	@ Astros	7–8	Pettitte (1-1)	Davis (2-2)	Lidge (5)	32,173	5-10
16	April 22	@ Giants	6–1	Santos (1-0)	Rueter (0-2)		36,994	6-10
17	April 23	@ Giants	2–6	Tomko (1-3)	Capuano (0-2)	Benítez (4)	37,341	6-11
18	April 24	@ Giants	8–5	Glover (1-1)	Williams (0-2)	Turnbow (1)	36,604	7-11
–	April 25	@ Cardinals	Postponed (rain) Rescheduled for April 28					
19	April 26	@ Cardinals	3–5	Suppan (2-2)	Davis (2-3)	Flores (1)	28,787	7-12
20	April 27	@ Cardinals	3–6	Carpenter (4-1)	Santos (1-1)	Tavárez (1)	38,343	7-13
21	April 28	@ Cardinals	4–3	Capuano (1-2)	Marquis (3-1)	Turnbow (2)	?	8-13
22	April 29	Reds	4–3	Glover (2-1)	Claussen (1-2)	Turnbow (3)	21,332	9-13
23	April 30	Reds	6–5	Turnbow (1-1)	Valentine (0-1)		23,880	10-13

May (14-14)
#	Date	Opponent	Score	Win	Loss	Save	Attendance	Record
24	May 1	Reds	13–3	Davis (3-3)	Ortiz (0-1)		23,036	11-13
25	May 3	Cubs	4–1	Capuano (2-2)	Zambrano (2-1)	Turnbow (4)	27,079	12-13
26	May 4	Cubs	4–3	Turnbow (2-1)	Novoa (0-1)		28,392	13-13
27	May 5	Cubs	6–5	Turnbow (3-1)	Hawkins (1-2)		31,721	14-13
28	May 6	Mets	4–7	Zambrano (2-3)	Davis (3-4)	Looper (7)	21,067	14-14
29	May 7	Mets	5–7	Martínez (4-1)	Santana (0-1)	Hernández (1)	39,589	14-15
30	May 8	Mets	5–4	Turnbow (4-1)	DeJean (1-1)		17,626	15-15
31	May 9	Phillies	2–4	Wolf (2-4)	Santos (1-2)	Wagner (8)	11,103	15-16
32	May 10	Phillies	8–5	Santana (1-1)	Adams (0-2)	Bottalico (1)	12,082	16-16
33	May 11	Phillies	5–2	Davis (4-4)	Lidle (2-3)	Turnbow (5)	13,175	17-16
34	May 13	@ Pirates	4–3	Capuano (3-2)	Mesa (0-1)	Turnbow (6)	23,845	18-16
35	May 14	@ Pirates	0–2	Redman (2-3)	Santos (1-3)		21,772	18-17
36	May 15	@ Pirates	2–4	Williams (4-3)	Glover (2-2)	Mesa (13)	15,134	18-18
37	May 16	@ Nationals	2–5	Armas (1-1)	Davis (4-5)	Ayala (1)	26,606	18-19
38	May 17	@ Nationals	8–2	Obermueller (1-0)	Vargas (0-1)		26,427	19-19
39	May 18	@ Nationals	0–1	Majewski (1-0)	Capuano (3-3)		29,216	19-20
40	May 19	@ Nationals	2–3	Hernández (7-2)	Santos (1-4)	Cordero (10)	30,968	19-21
41	May 20	@ Twins	1–7	Silva (3-2)	Glover (2-3)		30,073	19-22
42	May 21	@ Twins	6–0	Davis (5-5)	Radke (4-4)		32,106	20-22
43	May 22	@ Twins	5–6 (11)	Crain (3-0)	Wise (0-1)		28,466	20-23
44	May 23	Rockies	2–1	Capuano (4-3)	Chacón (1-4)	Bottalico (2)	11,855	21-23
45	May 24	Rockies	6–1	Santos (2-4)	Francis (4-2)		17,759	22-23
46	May 25	Rockies	11–1	Glover (3-3)	Wright (2-5)		24,916	23-23
47	May 27	Astros	3–0	Davis (6-5)	Oswalt (5-6)	Turnbow (7)	22,173	24-23
48	May 28	Astros	6–9	Rodríguez (1-1)	Sheets (1-4)	Lidge (9)	37,845	24-24
49	May 29	Astros	1–2	Pettitte (3-5)	Capuano (4-4)	Lidge (10)	34,402	24-25
50	May 30	@ Padres	1–2	Linebrink (2-1)	de la Rosa (2-1)		36,152	24-26
51	May 31	@ Padres	4–8	Reyes (3-0)	Glover (3-4)		23,124	24-27

June (12-15)
#	Date	Opponent	Score	Win	Loss	Save	Attendance	Record
52	June 1	@ Padres	5–2	Davis (7-5)	Lawrence (3-6)	Santana (1)	27,692	25-27
53	June 2	@ Dodgers	4–6	Carrara (5-2)	Sheets (1-5)	Gagné (4)	32,004	25-28
54	June 3	@ Dodgers	7–5	Capuano (5-4)	Weaver (5-5)	Turnbow (8)	41,528	26-28
55	June 4	@ Dodgers	1–2	Houlton (1-0)	Santos (2-5)	Gagné (5)	46,287	26-29
56	June 5	@ Dodgers	6–10	Penny (3-2)	Obermueller (1-1)		40,876	26-30
57	June 6	Yankees	4–3	Davis (8-5)	Johnson (5-5)	Turnbow (9)	34,627	27-30
58	June 7	Yankees	2–1	Sheets (2-5)	Pavano (4-5)	Turnbow (10)	35,611	28-30
59	June 8	Yankees	3–12	Mussina (6-4)	Capuano (5-5)		37,586	28-31
60	June 10	@ Phillies	2–5	Madson (3-2)	Wise (0-2)		27,225	28-32
61	June 11	@ Phillies	5–7	Cormier (2-1)	Bottalico (0-1)	Urbina (10)	33,455	28-33
62	June 12	@ Phillies	2–6	Lidle (6-4)	Sheets (2-6)		40,385	28-34
63	June 13	@ Devil Rays	3–5	Waechter (3-3)	Capuano (5-6)	Báez (8)	8,878	28-35
64	June 14	@ Devil Rays	4–0	Ohka (5-3)	Fossum (2-5)		8,897	29-35
65	June 15	@ Devil Rays	3–5	Nomo (4-6)	Santos (2-6)	Báez (9)	8,801	29-36
66	June 17	@ Blue Jays	5–9	Walker (2-0)	Davis (8-6)		17,615	29-37
67	June 18	@ Blue Jays	5–2	Sheets (3-6)	Halladay (10-4)	Phelps (1)	25,264	30-37
68	June 19	@ Blue Jays	5–2	Capuano (6-6)	Towers (5-6)	Turnbow (11)	30,480	31-37
69	June 20	Cubs	4–5	Maddux (6-4)	Ohka (5-4)	Dempster (9)	40,126	31-38
70	June 21	Cubs	2–4	Williams (1-2)	Santos (2-7)	Dempster (10)	40,300	31-39
71	June 22	Cubs	9–4	Davis (9-6)	Zambrano (4-4)		41,453	32-39
72	June 23	Cubs	8–7	Bottalico (1-1)	Remlinger (0-2)	Turnbow (12)	42,288	33-39
73	June 24	Twins	3–1	Capuano (7-6)	Radke (5-7)	Turnbow (13)	36,023	34-39
74	June 25	Twins	7–6	Wise (1-2)	Santana (7-4)	Turnbow (14)	44,685	35-39
75	June 26	Twins	2–5	Lohse (6-6)	Santos (2-8)		34,324	35-40
76	June 28	@ Cubs	0–2	Zambrano (5-4)	Davis (9-7)	Dempster (12)	39,574	35-41
77	June 29	@ Cubs	2–3	Novoa (2-1)	Santana (1-2)		38,846	35-42
78	June 30	@ Cubs	10–6	Capuano (8-6)	Maddux (7-5)		38,631	36-42

July (16-12)
#	Date	Opponent	Score	Win	Loss	Save	Attendance	Record
79	July 1	Pirates	8–4	Wise (2-2)	Redman (4-7)		21,804	37-42
80	July 2	Pirates	5–3	Bottalico (2-1)	Torres (2-4)	Turnbow (15)	29,052	38-42
81	July 3	Pirates	10–11	Meadows (3-1)	Phelps (0-2)	Mesa (20)	28,323	38-43
82	July 4	@ Marlins	3–2	Sheets (4-6)	Jones (1-3)	Turnbow (16)	24,207	39-43
83	July 5	@ Marlins	6–4	Capuano (9-6)	Beckett (8-6)	Turnbow (17)	16,441	40-43
84	July 6	@ Marlins	4–5 (12)	De Los Santos (1-0)	Obermueller (1-2)		17,079	40-44
85	July 7	@ Marlins	3–11	Moehler (4-6)	Santos (2-9)		33,897	40-45
86	July 8	@ Braves	1–2	Kolb (2-5)	Santana (1-3)		29,402	40-46
87	July 9	@ Braves	9–6	Sheets (5-6)	Davies (4-3)		40,514	41-46
88	July 10	@ Braves	8–4	Capuano (10-6)	Colón (1-5)		24,916	42-46
89	July 14	Nationals	4–2	Wise (3-2)	Majewski (2-1)	Turnbow (18)	30,611	43-46
90	July 15	Nationals	4–3	Santana (2-3)	Ayala (7-6)		40,690	44-46
91	July 16	Nationals	3–5	Loaiza (6-5)	Bottalico (2-2)	Cordero (32)	45,079	44-47
92	July 17	Nationals	5–3	Ohka (6-4)	Drese (7-8)	Turnbow (19)	23,543	45-47
93	July 18	@ Cardinals	4–11	Morris (11-2)	Santos (2-10)		41,827	45-48
94	July 19	@ Cardinals	5–4	Wise (4-2)	Tavárez (1-2)	Turnbow (20)	44,270	46-48
95	July 20	@ Cardinals	2–4	Mulder (11-5)	Sheets (5-7)	Isringhausen (27)	40,904	46-49
96	July 21	@ Cardinals	12–7	Capuano (11-6)	Marquis (9-7)		44,002	47-49
97	July 22	@ Reds	6–11	Ortiz (6-6)	Ohka (6-5)		21,370	47-50
98	July 23	@ Reds	11–7	Santos (3-10)	Claussen (4-8)		36,320	48-50
99	July 24	@ Reds	2–3	Weathers (6-1)	Santana (2-4)		18,856	48-51
100	July 25	Diamondbacks	4–2	Sheets (6-7)	Worrell (0-2)	Turnbow (21)	20,062	49-51
101	July 26	Diamondbacks	7–2	Eveland (1-0)	Webb (8-8)		31,128	50-51
102	July 27	Diamondbacks	0–3	Vargas (4-5)	Ohka (6-6)	Bruney (12)	28,971	50-52
103	July 28	Giants	0–3	Hennessey (4-3)	Santos (3-11)	Walker (17)	22,252	50-53
104	July 29	Giants	6–7	Fassero (2-6)	Wise (4-3)	Walker (18)	28,652	50-54
105	July 30	Giants	7–1	Sheets (7-7)	Schmidt (7-6)		38,462	51-54
106	July 31	Giants	5–1	Capuano (12-6)	Lowry (6-11)		36,148	52-54

August (13-14)
#	Date	Opponent	Score	Win	Loss	Save	Attendance	Record
107	August 2	@ Mets	8–9 (11)	Looper (4-4)	Santana (2-5)		32,453	52-55
108	August 3	@ Mets	6–4	Helling (1-0)	Looper (4-5)	Turnbow (22)	40,659	53-55
109	August 4	@ Mets	12–9	Santana (3-5)	Hernández (5-5)	Turnbow (23)	30,359	54-55
110	August 5	@ Phillies	3–1 (10)	Sheets (8-7)	Geary (1-1)	Wise (1)	31,759	55-55
111	August 6	@ Phillies	2–8	Lieber (10-10)	Capuano (12-7)		35,800	55-56
112	August 7	@ Phillies	2–0	Ohka (7-6)	Padilla (5-11)	Turnbow (24)	35,017	56-56
113	August 8	Cardinals	4–8	Flores (2-1)	Wise (4-4)		30,260	56-57
114	August 9	Cardinals	2–5	Reyes (1-0)	Davis (9-8)	Isringhausen (30)	28,556	56-58
115	August 10	Cardinals	0–3	Suppan (11-8)	Sheets (8-8)	Isringhausen (31)	37,650	56-59
116	August 12	Reds	3–5	Hudson (4-5)	Capuano (12-8)	Weathers (8)	24,103	56-60
117	August 13	Reds	1–4	Ortiz (7-8)	Ohka (7-7)	Weathers (9)	41,282	56-61
118	August 14	Reds	8–3	Davis (1-0)	Belisle (2-6)		29,262	57-61
119	August 15	@ Rockies	2–11	Cook (1-1)	Sheets (8-9)		18,596	57-62
120	August 16	@ Rockies	6–4	Santos (4-11)	Francis (11-9)	Turnbow (25)	18,582	58-62
121	August 17	@ Rockies	2–0	Capuano (13-8)	Wright (6-14)	Turnbow (26)	19,288	59-62
122	August 18	@ Astros	5–2	Ohka (8-7)	Clemens (11-5)	Turnbow (27)	29,844	60-62
123	August 19	@ Astros	3–5	Springer (4-3)	Davis (9-9)	Lidge (30)	31,651	60-63
124	August 20	@ Astros	3–2	Sheets (9-9)	Harville (0-2)		41,101	61-63
125	August 21	@ Astros	3–8	Pettitte (11-9)	Santos (4-12)		35,712	61-64
126	August 23	Marlins	11–2	Capuano (14-8)	Beckett (12-7)		20,318	62-64
127	August 24	Marlins	6–4	Ohka (9-7)	Burnett (12-7)	Turnbow (28)	33,323	63-64
128	August 25	Marlins	1–3 (11)	Alfonseca (1-1)	Capellán (0-1)	Jones (29)	22,843	63-65
129	August 26	Braves	3–1	Sheets (10-9)	Ramírez (10-8)	Turnbow (29)	30,670	64-65
130	August 27	Braves	4–8	Smoltz (13-7)	Santos (4-13)		42,464	64-66
131	August 28	Braves	2–5	Hudson (11-7)	Capuano (14-9)		35,060	64-67
132	August 30	Pirates	0–6	Maholm (1-0)	Davis (9-10)		28,337	64-68
133	August 31	Pirates	6–5	Turnbow (5-1)	Mesa (2-8)		15,062	65-68

September (16-11)
#	Date	Opponent	Score	Win	Loss	Save	Attendance	Record
134	September 1	Padres	5–6	Seánez (6-1)	Davis (1-1)	Hoffman (35)	24,785	65-69
135	September 2	Padres	12–2	Capuano (15-9)	Lawrence (7-14)		18,231	66-69
136	September 3	Padres	1–6	Williams (7-11)	Obermueller (1-3)		32,022	66-70
137	September 4	Padres	3–2	Turnbow (6-1)	Otsuka (1-6)		20,042	67-70
138	September 5	@ Reds	6–1	Ohka (10-7)	Belisle (3-7)	Eveland (1)	16,144	68-70
139	September 6	@ Reds	1–2 (10)	Mercker (3-1)	de la Rosa (2-2)		13,351	68-71
140	September 7	@ Reds	14–5	Capuano (16-9)	Milton (7-14)		15,886	69-71
141	September 9	Astros	7–4	Davis (10-10)	Clemens (11-7)	Turnbow (30)	18,130	70-71
142	September 10	Astros	5–7	Pettitte (15-9)	Ohka (10-8)	Lidge (36)	24,437	70-72
143	September 11	Astros	4–2	Helling (2-0)	Oswalt (17-12)	Turnbow (31)	17,392	71-72
144	September 13	@ Diamondbacks	3–1	Capuano (17-9)	Vázquez (10-15)	Turnbow (32)	23,708	72-72
145	September 14	@ Diamondbacks	1–2 (12)	Medders (2-0)	Lehr (0-1)		23,793	72-73
146	September 15	@ Diamondbacks	14–2	Ohka (11-8)	Estes (7-8)		20,741	73-73
147	September 16	@ Astros	1–2	Lidge (4-3)	Eveland (1-1)		33,767	73-74
148	September 17	@ Astros	0–7	Backe (9-8)	Obermueller (1-4)		37,756	73-75
149	September 18	@ Astros	1–6	Rodríguez (10-8)	Capuano (17-10)		35,052	73-76
150	September 20	Cubs	5–3	Davis (11-10)	Williams (5-9)	Turnbow (33)	30,136	74-76
151	September 21	Cubs	7–6	Turnbow (7-1)	Van Buren (0-2)		30,049	75-76
152	September 22	Cubs	0–3	Maddux (13-13)	Helling (2-1)	Dempster (29)	31,137	75-77
153	September 23	Cardinals	9–6	Capuano (18-10)	Carpenter (21-5)	Turnbow (34)	22,472	76-77
154	September 24	Cardinals	8–7	Glover (4-4)	Mulder (16-8)	Turnbow (35)	33,506	77-77
155	September 25	Cardinals	0–2	Suppan (16-10)	Davis (11-11)	Isringhausen (37)	20,150	77-78
156	September 26	Reds	12–9	Capellán (1-1)	Coffey (4-1)	Turnbow (36)	14,412	78-78
157	September 27	Reds	6–2	Helling (3-1)	Claussen (10-10)	Turnbow (37)	28,031	79-78
158	September 28	Reds	4–11	Harang (11-13)	Capuano (18-11)		21,181,	79-79
159	September 29	Reds	2–0	Glover (5-4)	Milton (8-15)	Turnbow (38)	13,173	80-79
160	September 30	@ Pirates	6–5	Lehr (1-1)	Vogelsong (2-2)	Turnbow (39)	20,922	81-79

October (0-2)
#	Date	Opponent	Score	Win	Loss	Save	Attendance	Record
161	October 1	@ Pirates	1–5	Wells (8-18)	Ohka (11-9)		17,261	81-80
162	October 2	@ Pirates	1–3	Duke (8-2)	Capuano (18-12)	Torres (3)	23,008	81-81
