= 2005 St. Louis Cardinals season =

Major League Baseball season

2005 St. Louis Cardinals
- National League Central champions
- League: National League
- Division: Central
- Ballpark: Busch Memorial Stadium
- City: St. Louis, Missouri
- Record: 100–62 (.617)
- Divisional place: 1st
- Owners: William DeWitt Jr.
- General managers: Walt Jocketty
- Managers: Tony La Russa
- Television: FSN Midwest (Joe Buck, Dan McLaughlin, Al Hrabosky); KPLR (Ricky Horton, Bob Carpenter)
- Radio: KMOX (Mike Shannon, Wayne Hagin)

The 2005 St. Louis Cardinals season was the 124th season for the St. Louis Cardinals, a Major League Baseball franchise in St. Louis, Missouri. It was the 114th season for the Cardinals in the National League and their 40th and final in Busch Memorial Stadium as they moved to the Busch Stadium III the next year.

The Cardinals went 100–62 during the season and won the National League Central by 11 games over the NL Wild-Card Champion and eventual NL Champion Houston Astros. In the playoffs the Cardinals swept the San Diego Padres 3 games to 0 in the NLDS. However, the Cardinals lost to the Astros 4 games to 2 in the NLCS.

The Cardinals moved their radio broadcasts from KMOX after a 52-year affiliation to KTRS after the season. After the 2010 season, the Cardinals would move their radio broadcasts from KTRS back to KMOX, starting in 2011.

First baseman Albert Pujols won the MVP Award this year, batting .330, with 41 home runs and 117 RBIs. Chris Carpenter won the Cy Young Award this year, with a 2.83 ERA, 21 wins, and 213 strikeouts. Outfielder Jim Edmonds won a Gold Glove this year. The Cardinals pitching staff led Major League Baseball by having the lowest (ERA) (3.49), conceding the fewest earned runs (560) and pitching the most complete games (15).

== Offseason ==
- December 18, 2004: Dan Haren was traded by the St. Louis Cardinals with Daric Barton and Kiko Calero to the Oakland Athletics for Mark Mulder.
- February 21, 2005: Bill Pulsipher was signed as a free agent with the St. Louis Cardinals.

== Regular season ==
A herniated disc in Larry Walker's neck prevented him from turning his head to the left. He received a second cortisone shot to alleviate the pain on June 27. With eight previous surgeries and now playing with pain that impeded his ability to continue to produce at a high level, he signaled that he would retire from playing after the season. He had $12 million team option for 2006.

On August 4, the Cardinals announced that they had bought a 50% share of KTRS 550 AM and was leaving the longtime flagship station KMOX 1120 AM after 52 years and transferring the games to KTRS in 2006.

The Cardinals clinched their fifth National League Central division title in six years on September 17 when they beat the Cubs 5-1. The final regular season game at Busch Memorial Stadium took place on October 2, a 7-5 victory over the Cincinnati Reds. Rookie Chris Duncan hit the final regular season home run at that version of Busch Stadium.

=== Game log ===
2005 St. Louis Cardinals Game Log (100–62)
April: (15–7)

#	Date	Opponent	Score	Win	Loss	Save	Attendance	Record
1	April 5	@ Astros	7–3	Carpenter	Oswalt	Isringhausen	43,567	1–0
2	April 6	@ Astros	1–4	Qualls	Tavárez	Lidge	28,496	1–1
3	April 8	Phillies	6–5	Reyes	Madson	Isringhausen	50,074	2–1
4	April 9	Phillies	4–10	Floyd	Suppan		39,242	2–2
5	April 10	Phillies	4–13	Lieber	Carpenter		37,971	2–3
6	April 12	Reds	5–1	Marquis	Harang		33,617	3–3
7	April 13	Reds	5–6	Belisle	Mulder	Graves	28,772	3–4
8	April 15	@ Brewers	3–0	Suppan	Sheets	Isringhausen	22,676	4–4
9	April 16	@ Brewers	5–3	Carpenter	Davis	Isringhausen	30,732	5–4
10	April 17	@ Brewers	3–2	Marquis	Adams	Isringhausen	21,144	6–4
11	April 18	@ Pirates	11–1	Mulder	D. Williams		11,220	7–4
12	April 19	@ Pirates	7–1	Morris	Fogg		12,285	8–4
13	April 20	Cubs	1–3	Zambrano	Suppan	Hawkins	44,855	8–5
14	April 21	Cubs	4–0	Carpenter	Dempster		46,119	9–5
15	April 22	Astros	8–7	Marquis	Duckworth	Isringhausen	44,805	10–5
16	April 23	Astros	1–0	Mulder	Qualls		40,058	11–5
17	April 24	Astros	8–5	Morris	Backe	Isringhausen	39,020	12–5
18	April 26	Brewers	5–3	Suppan	Davis	Flores	28,787	13–5
19	April 27	Brewers	6–3	Carpenter	Santos	Tavárez	38,343	14–5
20	April 28	Brewers	3–4	Capuano	Marquis	Turnbow	26,026	14–6
21	April 29	@ Braves	6–5	Mulder	Hudson	Reyes	33,833	15–6
22	April 30	@ Braves	2–3	Kolb	Journell		35,789	15–7

May: (18–11)

#	Date	Opponent	Score	Win	Loss	Save	Attendance	Record
23	May 1	@ Braves	1–2	Smoltz	Suppan	Kolb	34,304	15–8
24	May 2	@ Reds	10–9	Flores	Graves	Tavárez	15,961	16–8
25	May 3	@ Reds	4–2	Marquis	Harang	Reyes	16,512	17–8
26	May 4	@ Reds	7–3	Mulder	Claussen		17,241	18–8
27	May 5	Padres	3–8	Hammond	King		30,507	18–9
28	May 6	Padres	5–6	Williams	Flores	Hoffman	47,160	18–10
29	May 7	Padres	4–5	Eaton	Carpenter	Hoffman		18–11
30	May 8	Padres	15–5	Marquis	Redding	Thompson	46,444	19–11
31	May 9	Dodgers	4–2	Mulder	Perez	Reyes	37,194	20–11
32	May 10	Dodgers	8–9	Alvarez	Jarvis	Brazoban	38,984	20–12
33	May 11	Dodgers	9–3	Suppan	Penny		35,671	21–12
34	May 12	Dodgers	10–3	Carpenter	Lowe		45,656	22–12
35	May 13	@ Mets	0–2	Glavine	Marquis	Looper	43,495	22–13
36	May 14	@ Mets	7–6	Tavárez	R. Hernandez	Isringhausen	40,921	23–13
37	May 15	@ Mets	4–2	Morris	Heilman	Isringhausen	32,949	24–13
38	May 17	@ Phillies	5–7	Lidle	Suppan	Wagner	32,103	24–14
39	May 18	@ Phillies	8–4	Carpenter	Lieber		29,130	25–14
40	May 19	@ Phillies	4–7	Myers	Marquis		38,229	25–15
41	May 20	@ Royals	7–6	Mulder	Greinke	Isringhausen	31,513	26–15
42	May 21	@ Royals	6–5	Morris	Cerda	Isringhausen	39,781	27–15
43	May 22	@ Royals	2–9	Jensen	Suppan		29,269	27–16
44	May 23	Pirates	4–2	Carpenter	D. Williams	Isringhausen	33,073	28–16
45	May 24	Pirates	2–1	Reyes	Mesa		36,285	29–16
46	May 25	Pirates	11–5	Mulder	Redman		34,895	30–16
47	May 27	Nationals	6–3	Morris	Armas	Isringhausen	47,383	31–16
48	May 28	Nationals	3–1	Suppan	Loaiza	Isringhausen	49,123	32–16
49	May 29	Nationals	2–3	L. Hernandez	Carpenter	Cordero	47,012	32–17
50	May 30	@ Rockies	5–4	Marquis	Witasick	Isringhausen	34,239	33–17
51	May 31	@ Rockies	1–2	Jennings	Mulder	Fuentes	23,519	33–18

June: (16–11)

#	Date	Opponent	Score	Win	Loss	Save	Attendance	Record
52	June 1	@ Rockies	8–6	Morris	Neal	Isringhausen	22,266	34–18
53	June 2	@ Rockies	7–8	Fuentes	Isringhausen		21,381	34–19
54	June 3	@ Astros	2–0	Carpenter	Pettitte	Tavárez	34,092	35–19
55	June 4	@ Astros	11–9	Marquis	Rodriguez	Isringhausen	39,288	36–19
56	June 5	@ Astros	4–6	Clemens	Mulder	Lidge	34,009	36–20
57	June 6	Red Sox	7–1	Morris	Wakefield		50,270	37–20
58	June 7	Red Sox	9–2	Suppan	Clement		47,496	38–20
59	June 8	Red Sox	0–4	Wells	Carpenter		46,928	38–21
60	June 10	Yankees	8–1	Marquis	Wang		50,250	39–21
61	June 11	Yankees	0–5	Johnson	Mulder	Rivera	50,177	39–22
62	June 12	Yankees	5–3	King	Sturtze	Isringhausen	50,372	40–22
63	June 13	@ Blue Jays	1–4	Halladay	Suppan		20,032	40–23
64	June 14	@ Blue Jays	7–0	Carpenter	Gaudin		37,536	41–23
65	June 15	@ Blue Jays	2–5	Lilly	Marquis	Batista	22,908	41–24
66	June 17	@ Devil Rays	6–4	Mulder	Harper	Isringhausen	19,099	42–24
67	June 18	@ Devil Rays	5–2	Morris	Hendrickson	Isringhausen	20,416	43–24
68	June 19	@ Devil Rays	8–5	Suppan	Waechter	Isringhausen	21,275	44–24
69	June 20	@ Reds	6–1	Carpenter	Harang		22,035	45–24
70	June 21	@ Reds	4–11	Claussen	Marquis		22,268	45–25
71	June 22	@ Reds	6–7	Ortiz	Mulder	Mercker	31,566	45–26
72	June 23	Pirates	7–11	Williams	Morris	R. White	43,590	45–27
73	June 24	Pirates	8–1	Suppan	Wells		48,184	46–27
74	June 25	Pirates	8–0	Carpenter	Redman		48,413	47–27
75	June 26	Pirates	4–5	Grabow	Reyes	Mesa	45,050	47–28
76	June 28	Reds	2–1	Mulder	Claussen	Isringhausen	38,640	48–28
77	June 29	Reds	11–3	Morris	Ortiz		39,298	49–28
78	June 30	Rockies	0–7	Francis	Suppan		44,036	49–29

July: (17–9)

#	Date	Opponent	Score	Win	Loss	Save	Attendance	Record
79	July 1	Rockies	6–0	Carpenter	Kennedy		40,128	50–29
80	July 2	Rockies	1–3	Wright	Marquis	Fuentes	47,913	50–30
81	July 3	Rockies	5–4	King	Witasick		47,811	51–30
82	July 4	@ Dbacks	10–3	Morris	Webb		31,197	52–30
83	July 5	@ Dbacks	7–1	Suppan	Estes		23,590	53–30
84	July 6	@ Dbacks	2–1	Carpenter	Vazquez	Isringhausen	21,076	54–30
85	July 7	@ Dbacks	1–2	Cormier	King		21,959	54–31
86	July 8	@ Giants	3–1	Mulder	Schmidt	Isringhausen	41,405	55–31
87	July 9	@ Giants	0–2	Hennessey	Morris	Walker	42,423	55–32
88	July 10	@ Giants	4–3	Suppan	Lowry	Isringhausen	41,925	56–32
89	July 15	Astros	4–3	Thompson	Harville		48,420	57–32
90	July 16	Astros	4–2	Marquis	Oswalt	Isringhausen	48,034	58–32
91	July 17	Astros	3–0	Carpenter	Clemens		46,584	59–32
92	July 18	Brewers	11–4	Morris	Santos		41,827	60–32
93	July 19	Brewers	4–5	Wise	Tavárez	Turnbow	44,270	60–33
94	July 20	Brewers	4–2	Mulder	Sheets	Isringhausen	40,904	61–33
95	July 21	Brewers	7–12	Capuano	Marquis		44,002	61–34
96	July 22	Cubs	2–1	Reyes	Mitre		49,840	62–34
97	July 23	Cubs	5–6	J. Williams	Morris	Dempster	49,942	62–35
98	July 24	Cubs	4–8	Dempster	Reyes		49,762	62–36
99	July 26	@ Padres	4–2	Mulder	Williams	Isringhausen	36,659	63–36
100	July 27	@ Padres	1–2	Hoffman	Marquis		37,592	63–37
101	July 28	@ Padres	11–3	Carpenter	Stauffer		38,760	64–37
102	July 29	@ Dodgers	5–7	Sanchez	Morris	Brazoban	53,783	64–38
103	July 30	@ Dodgers	9–4	Suppan	Lowe		47,805	65–38
104	July 31	@ Dodgers	7–5	Eldred	Alvarez	Isringhausen	44,543	66–38

August: (19–11)

#	Date	Opponent	Score	Win	Loss	Save	Attendance	Record
105	August 1	Marlins	5–6	Valdez	Marquis	T. Jones	43,403	66–39
106	August 2	Marlins	3–1	Carpenter	Willis		43,557	67–39
107	August 3	Marlins	9–6	Morris	Villone		43,111	68–39
108	August 4	Marlins	3–4	Burnett	Suppan	T. Jones	44,201	68–40
109	August 5	Braves	11–3	Mulder	Smoltz		47,838	69–40
110	August 6	Braves	1–8	Hudson	Marquis		48,565	69–41
111	August 7	Braves	5–3	King	Reitsma		47,714	70–41
112	August 8	@ Brewers	8–4	Flores	Wise		30,260	71–41
113	August 9	@ Brewers	5–2	Reyes	Davis	Isringhausen	28,556	72–41
114	August 10	@ Brewers	3–0	Suppan	Sheets	Isringhausen	37,650	73–41
115	August 11	@ Cubs	4–11	Maddux	Mulder		38,170	73–42
116	August 12	@ Cubs	1–4	Zambrano	Marquis		39,717	73–43
117	August 13	@ Cubs	5–2	Carpenter	J. Williams		39,923	74–43
118	August 14	@ Cubs	4–5	Prior	Morris	Dempster	39,311	74–44
119	August 16	Dbacks	8–2	Suppan	Halsey		42,198	75–44
120	August 17	Dbacks	5–0	Mulder	Webb		41,407	76–44
121	August 18	Dbacks	2–9	Vargas	Marquis		44,625	76–45
122	August 19	Giants	5–4	Tavárez	Accardo		46,200	77–45
123	August 20	Giants	4–2	Morris	Correia	Isringhausen	47,169	78–45
124	August 21	Giants	2–4	Schmidt	Suppan	Benitez	46,113	78–46
125	August 22	@ Pirates	3–1	Mulder	Fogg	Isringhausen	23,751	79–46
126	August 23	@ Pirates	0–10	Torres	Marquis		23,948	79–47
127	August 24	@ Pirates	8–3	Carpenter	Wells		21,506	80–47
128	August 25	@ Pirates	6–3	Morris	D. Williams	Isringhausen	24,626	81–47
129	August 26	@ Nationals	1–4	Loaiza	Suppan	Cordero	37,885	81–48
130	August 27	@ Nationals	6–0	Marquis	White		44,254	82–48
131	August 28	@ Nationals	6–0	Thompson	Halama		41,130	83–48
132	August 29	@ Marlins	6–1	Carpenter	Burnett		18,388	84–48
133	August 30	@ Marlins	6–7	Mota	Morris	T. Jones	20,073	84–49
134	August 31	@ Marlins	10–5	Suppan	Vargas		20,656	85–49

September: (13–13)

#	Date	Opponent	Score	Win	Loss	Save	Attendance	Record
135	September 2	@ Astros	5–6	Qualls	Tavárez		38,511	85–50
136	September 3	@ Astros	4–2	Carpenter	Springer		42,817	86–50
137	September 4	@ Astros	4–1	Marquis	Rodriguez		38,277	87–50
138	September 5	Cubs	6–4	King	Novoa	Tavárez	49,646	88–50
139	September 6	Cubs	2–5	Rusch	Morris	Dempster	47,292	88–51
140	September 7	Cubs	1–2	Maddux	Mulder	Dempster	47,789	88–52
141	September 8	Mets	5–0	Carpenter	Benson		47,422	89–52
142	September 9	Mets	3–2	Marquis	Seo	Isringhausen	45,616	90–52
143	September 10	Mets	4–2	Suppan	Trachsel	Isringhausen	48,465	91–52
144	September 11	Mets	2–7	Martinez	Morris		45,884	91–53
145	September 12	Pirates	4–3	Isringhausen	Torres		40,064	92–53
146	September 13	Pirates	5–4	Thompson	R. White		40,599	93–53
147	September 14	Pirates	3–5	Vogelsong	Marquis	M. Gonzalez	40,172	93–54
148	September 15	@ Cubs	6–1	Suppan	Prior		37,849	94–54
149	September 16	@ Cubs	3–5	Rusch	Morris	Dempster	38,080	94–55
150	September 17	@ Cubs	5–1	Mulder	Maddux		39,269	95–55
151	September 18	@ Cubs	4–7	Zambrano	Reyes		38,182	95–56
152	September 20	@ Reds	5–6	Hancock	King	Weathers	16,587	95–57
153	September 21	@ Reds	5–1	Marquis	Ortiz		16,784	96–57
154	September 22	@ Reds	2–6	Coffey	King		17,461	96–58
155	September 23	@ Brewers	6–9	Capuano	Carpenter	Turnbow	22,472	96–59
156	September 24	@ Brewers	7–8	Glover	Mulder	Turnbow	33,506	96–60
157	September 25	@ Brewers	2–0	Suppan	Davis	Isringhausen	20,150	97–60
158	September 27	Astros	1–3	Oswalt	Morris	Lidge	40,260	97–61
159	September 28	Astros	6–7	Qualls	Isringhausen	Lidge	40,616	97–62
160	September 30	Reds	12–6	Reyes	Hudson		47,257	98–62

October: (2–0)

#	Date	Opponent	Score	Win	Loss	Save	Attendance	Record
161	October 1	Reds	9–6	Flores	Simpson	Isringhausen	49,487	99–62
162	October 2	Reds	7–5	Thompson	Claussen	Isringhausen	50,434	100–62

=== Postseason Game Log ===
2005 St. Louis Cardinals Postseason Game Log (5–4)
NLDS: (3–0)

#	Date	Opponent	Score	Win	Loss	Save	Attendance	Record
1	October 4	Padres	8–5	Carpenter	Peavy		52,349	1–0
2	October 6	Padres	6–2	Mulder	Astacio		52,599	2–0
3	October 8	@ Padres	7–4	Morris	W. Williams	Isringhausen	45,093	3–0

NLCS: (2–4)

#	Date	Opponent	Score	Win	Loss	Save	Attendance	Record
1	October 12	Astros	5–3	Carpenter	Pettitte	Isringhausen	52,332	1–0
2	October 13	Astros	1–4	Oswalt	Mulder	Lidge	52,358	1–1
3	October 15	@ Astros	3–4	Clemens	Morris	Lidge	42,823	1–2
4	October 16	@ Astros	1–2	Qualls		Lidge	43,010	1–3
5	October 17	@ Astros	5–4	Isringhausen	Lidge		43,470	2–3
6	October 19	Astros	1–5	Oswalt	Mulder		52,438	2–4

=== Season standings ===
==== National League Central ====
NL Central
Team	W	L	Pct.	GB	Home	Road
St. Louis Cardinals	100	62	.617	—	50‍–‍31	50‍–‍31
Houston Astros	89	73	.549	11	53‍–‍28	36‍–‍45
Milwaukee Brewers	81	81	.500	19	46‍–‍35	35‍–‍46
Chicago Cubs	79	83	.488	21	38‍–‍43	41‍–‍40
Cincinnati Reds	73	89	.451	27	42‍–‍39	31‍–‍50
Pittsburgh Pirates	67	95	.414	33	34‍–‍47	33‍–‍48

==== Record vs. opponents ====
2005 National League record Source: MLB Standings Grid – 2005
Team	AZ	ATL	CHC	CIN	COL	FLA	HOU	LAD	MIL	NYM	PHI	PIT	SD	SF	STL	WAS	AL
Arizona	—	3–3	5–2	2–4	11–7	2–4	3–3	13–5	2–4	1–6	3–4	3–4	10–9	7–11	2–5	2–4	8–10
Atlanta	3–3	—	6–1	7–3	2–4	10–8	5–1	3–3	3–3	13–6	9–10	4–3	1–5	4–2	3–3	10–9	7–8
Chicago	2–5	1–6	—	6–9	4–3	5–4	9–7	4–2	7–9	2–4	2–4	11–5	4–3	5–2	10–6	1–5	6–9
Cincinnati	4–2	3–7	9–6	—	3–3	2–4	4–12	3–4	6–10	3–3	3–4	9–7	4–2	3–5	5–11	5–1	7-8
Colorado	7–11	4–2	3–4	3–3	—	3–3	1–5	11–8	1–5	3–4	2–4	3–7	7–11	7–11	4–4	2–4	6–9
Florida	4–2	8–10	4–5	4–2	3–3	—	4–3	5–2	3–4	8–10	9–10	3–4	2–4	4–2	3–4	9–9	10–5
Houston	3–3	1–5	7–9	12–4	5–1	3-4	—	4–2	10–5	5–5	6–0	9–7	4–3	3–4	5–11	5–2	7–8
Los Angeles	5–13	3–3	2–4	4–3	8–11	2–5	2–4	—	5–1	3–3	3–3	5–2	11–7	9–10	2–5	2–4	5–13
Milwaukee	4–2	3–3	9–7	10–6	5–1	4–3	5–10	1–5	—	3–3	4–5	9–7	3–4	4–3	5–11	4–4	8–7
New York	6–1	6–13	4–2	3–3	4–3	10–8	5–5	3–3	3–3	—	11–7	3–3	4–2	3–3	2–5	11–8	5–10
Philadelphia	4-3	10–9	4–2	4–3	4–2	10–9	0–6	3–3	5–4	7–11	—	4–3	6–0	5–1	4–2	11–8	7–8
Pittsburgh	4–3	3–4	5–11	7–9	7–3	4–3	7–9	2–5	7–9	3–3	3–4	—	3–4	2–4	4–12	1–5	5–7
San Diego	9–10	5–1	3–4	2–4	11–7	4–2	3–4	7–11	4–3	2–4	0–6	4–3	—	12–6	4–3	5–1	7–11
San Francisco	11–7	2–4	2–5	5–3	11–7	2–4	4–3	10–9	3–4	3–3	1–5	4–2	6–12	—	2–4	3–3	6–12
St. Louis	5–2	3–3	6–10	11–5	4–4	4-3	11–5	5–2	11–5	5–2	2–4	12–4	3–4	4–2	—	4–2	10–5
Washington	4–2	9–10	5–1	1–5	4–2	9-9	2–5	4–2	4–4	8–11	8–11	5–1	1–5	3–3	2–4	—	12–6

=== Transactions ===
- July 29, 2005: Alan Benes was signed as a free agent with the St. Louis Cardinals.
- September 6, 2005: Bill Pulsipher was released by the St. Louis Cardinals.

=== Roster ===
2005 St. Louis Cardinals
Roster
Pitchers: 54 Carmen Cali; 29 Chris Carpenter; 23 Cal Eldred; 34 Randy Flores; 44 Jason Isringhausen; 32 Kevin Jarvis; 61 Tyler Johnson; 77 Jimmy Journell; 56 Ray King; 21 Jason Marquis; 35 Matt Morris; 30 Mark Mulder; 40 Bill Pulsipher; 52 Al Reyes; 26 Anthony Reyes; 37 Jeff Suppan; 50 Julián Tavárez; 48 Brad Thompson; 60 Adam Wainwright; 53 Gabe White	Catchers: 4 Einar Díaz; 46 Mike Mahoney; 41 Yadier Molina; Infielders: 62 Chris Duncan; 22 David Eckstein; 12 Mark Grudzielanek; 7 Héctor Luna; 3 Abraham Núñez; 5 Albert Pujols; 27 Scott Rolen; 28 Scott Seabol	Outfielders: 19 Roger Cedeño; 15 Jim Edmonds; 43 John Gall; 47 John Mabry; 53 John Rodriguez; 16 Reggie Sanders; 55 Skip Schumaker; 99 So Taguchi; 33 Larry Walker	Manager: 10 Tony La Russa; Coaches: 18 Dave Duncan (pitching); 38 Marty Mason (bullpen); 39 Dave McKay (first base); 12 Hal McRae (hitting); 11 José Oquendo (third base); 24 Joe Pettini (bench)

== Player stats ==
=== Batting ===
==== Starters by position ====
Note: Pos = Position; G = Games played; AB = At bats; H = Hits; Avg. = Batting average; HR = Home runs; RBI = Runs batted in

Pos	Player	G	AB	H	Avg.	HR	RBI
C	Yadier Molina	114	385	97	.252	8	49
1B	Albert Pujols	161	591	195	.330	41	117
2B	Mark Grudzielanek	137	528	155	.294	8	59
SS	David Eckstein	158	630	185	.294	8	61
3B	Abraham Núñez	139	421	120	.285	5	44
LF	Reggie Sanders	93	295	80	.271	21	54
CF	Jim Edmonds	142	467	123	.263	29	89
RF	Larry Walker	100	315	91	.289	15	52

==== Other batters ====
Note: G = Games played; AB = At bats; H = Hits; Avg. = Batting average; HR = Home runs; RBI = Runs batted in

Player	G	AB	H	Avg.	HR	RBI
So Taguchi	143	396	114	.288	8	53
John Mabry	112	246	59	.240	8	32
Scott Rolen	56	196	46	.235	5	28
John Rodriguez	56	149	44	.295	5	24
Héctor Luna	64	137	39	.285	1	18
Einar Díaz	58	130	27	.208	1	17
Scott Seabol	59	105	23	.219	1	10
Mike Mahoney	26	64	10	.156	1	6
Roger Cedeño	37	57	9	.158	0	8
John Gall	22	37	10	.270	2	10
Skip Schumaker	27	24	6	.250	0	1
Chris Duncan	9	10	2	.200	1	3

=== Pitching ===
==== Starting pitchers ====
Note: G = Games pitched; IP = Innings pitched; W = Wins; L = Losses; ERA = Earned run average; SO = Strikeouts

Player	G	IP	W	L	ERA	SO
Chris Carpenter	33	241.2	21	5	2.83	213
Jason Marquis	33	207.0	13	14	4.13	100
Mark Mulder	32	205.0	16	8	3.64	111
Jeff Suppan	32	194.1	16	10	3.87	114
Matt Morris	31	192.2	14	10	4.11	117

==== Other pitchers ====
Note: G = Games pitched; IP = Innings pitched; W = Wins; L = Losses; ERA = Earned run average; SO = Strikeouts

Player	G	IP	W	L	ERA	SO
Anthony Reyes	4	13.1	1	1	2.70	12

===== Relief pitchers =====
Note: G = Games pitched; W = Wins; L = Losses; SV = Saves; ERA = Earned run average; SO = Strikeouts

Player	G	W	L	SV	ERA	SO
Jason Isringhausen	63	1	2	39	2.14	51
Ray King	77	4	4	0	3.38	23
Julián Tavárez	74	2	3	4	3.43	47
Al Reyes	65	4	2	3	2.15	67
Randy Flores	50	3	1	1	3.46	43
Brad Thompson	40	4	0	1	2.95	29
Cal Eldred	31	1	0	0	2.19	29
Gabe White	6	0	0	0	2.16	1
Carmen Cali	6	0	0	0	10.50	5
Jimmy Journell	5	0	1	0	10.38	5
Bill Pulsipher	5	0	0	0	6.75	1
Tyler Johnson	5	0	0	0	0.00	4
Kevin Jarvis	4	0	1	0	13.50	2
Adam Wainwright	2	0	0	0	13.50	0

== NLDS ==
=== St. Louis Cardinals vs. San Diego Padres ===
St. Louis wins series, 3-0.

Game	Score	Date
1	St. Louis 8, San Diego 5	October 4
2	St. Louis 6, San Diego 2	October 6
3	St. Louis 7, San Diego 4	October 8

== NLCS ==
Down to their last out and strike and facing elimination in game 5 of the 2005 National League Championship Series, David Eckstein hit a single in the hole on the left side off of the Astros' Brad Lidge to bring the tying run to the plate. The next batter, Jim Edmonds, worked a base on balls. Albert Pujols followed with a 412-foot home run onto the train tracks behind left field (had the game been played with the roof open, the drive would have exited Minute Maid Park, as it first hit off the glass wall which forms part of the roof), to put the Cardinals ahead 5–4. The roar of the crowd, anticipating the end of the game that would signal the Astros' entrance into the World Series, was hushed as they watched Pujols' home run (one of the announcers described it as a "vacuum" from the sudden intake of air by the crowd). Houston was then shut down in the bottom of the 9th by the Cardinals' closer Jason Isringhausen to preserve the win, guaranteeing at least one more game at old Busch Stadium. However, the Astros dominated Game 6, shutting the Cardinals down 5–1 for their first berth in the World Series in franchise history. Walker struck out in the ninth inning, his final major league at bat. He retired shortly after the game.

Game	Date	Visitor	Score	Home	Score	Record (HOU-STL)
1	October 12	Houston	3	St. Louis	5	0-1
2	October 13	Houston	4	St. Louis	1	1-1
3	October 15	St. Louis	3	Houston	4	2-1
4	October 16	St. Louis	1	Houston	2	3-1
5	October 17	St. Louis	5	Houston	4	3-2
6	October 19	Houston	5	St. Louis	1	4-2
HOU won 4, STL won 2. Houston wins the National League Championship and advance to the 2005 World Series

== Awards and honors ==
- Cy Young Award: Chris Carpenter
- MVP: Albert Pujols

== Farm system ==
Level	Team	League	Manager
AAA	Memphis Redbirds	Pacific Coast League	Danny Sheaffer
AA	Springfield Cardinals	Texas League	Chris Maloney
A	Palm Beach Cardinals	Florida State League	Ron Warner
A	Quad Cities Swing	Midwest League	Joe Cunningham Jr.
A-Short Season	New Jersey Cardinals	New York–Penn League	Mark DeJohn
Rookie	Johnson City Cardinals	Appalachian League	Tom Kidwell

LEAGUE CHAMPIONS: Palm Beach
