= Víctor Santos =

Víctor or Victor Santos may refer to:

- Víctor Santos (baseball) (born 1976), Dominican professional baseball pitcher
- Víctor Santos (author) (born 1977), cartoonist and screenwriter of Valencian comics
- Victor Santos (football official) (born 1953), Andorran football official
- Victor Santos (skier) (born 1997), Brazilian cross-country skier
- Victor Santos (curler) (born 1999), Brazilian curler

== See also ==
- Vítor Santos (born 1958), Portuguese footballer
