= Giribet =

Giribet is a Catalan surname. Notable people with the surname include:

- Antoni Giribet (born 1965), Andorran association football player and activist
- Gonzalo Giribet (born 1970), Spanish zoologist
