= Greg Aquino =

Dominican baseball player (born 1978)

- Relief pitcher
- Born: January 11, 1978 (age 48); Santo Domingo, Dominican Republic
- Batted: Right Threw: Right

MLB debut
- July 2, 2004, for the Arizona Diamondbacks

Last MLB appearance
- June 17, 2009, for the Cleveland Indians

MLB statistics
- Win–loss record: 3–6
- Earned run average: 5.31
- Strikeouts: 143
- Stats at Baseball Reference

Teams
- Arizona Diamondbacks (2004–2006); Milwaukee Brewers (2007); Baltimore Orioles (2008); Cleveland Indians (2009)

Gregori Emilio Aquino Valera (/əˈkiːnoʊ/; Spanish pronunciation: [aˈkino]; born January 11, 1978) is a Dominican former professional baseball pitcher. He played in Major League Baseball (MLB) for the Arizona Diamondbacks, Milwaukee Brewers, Baltimore Orioles, and Cleveland Indians.

== Career ==
=== Arizona Diamondbacks ===
Aquino was originally signed as a 16-year-old infielder in 1995, by the Arizona Diamondbacks. After spending the next decade in the Diamondbacks' farm system, he made his major league debut on July 2, 2004, against the Minnesota Twins. That year, he was 0–2 with 16 saves and a 3.06 earned run average in 34 games. He then spent the following two seasons with the Diamondbacks.

=== Milwaukee Brewers ===
On November 25, 2006, Aquino was traded to the Milwaukee Brewers alongside catcher Johnny Estrada and pitcher Claudio Vargas in exchange for outfielder Dave Krynzel, and pitchers Doug Davis and Dana Eveland. Aquino began the 2007 season on the Brewers roster, but was optioned to the Triple-A Nashville Sounds on April 21. He was later recalled by Milwaukee on August 31 to replace Manny Parra, who was placed on the disabled list. In 15 appearances with the Brewers, Aquino went 0–1 with a 4.50 ERA.

=== Baltimore Orioles ===
On December 14, 2007, Aquino was claimed off waivers by the Baltimore Orioles. After a poor performance in the first month of the 2008 season, the Orioles designated Aquino for assignment on April 29, and he cleared waivers and was assigned to Triple-A on May 1. He became a free agent at the end of the season.

=== Cleveland Indians ===
Aquino signed a minor league contract with the Cleveland Indians on January 14, 2009. He attended Indians spring training in 2009 but was sent to Minor League camp on March 24, 2009. In October 2009, Aquino was granted free agency.

=== Chicago White Sox ===
On December 14, 2009, Aquino signed a minor league contract with the Chicago White Sox. He became a free agent after the 2010 season.

=== Sultanes de Monterrey ===
On June 7, 2011, Aquino signed with the Sultanes de Monterrey of the Mexican Baseball League. He was released on June 10, 2011.

=== Guerreros de Oaxaca ===
On June 20, 2011, Aquino signed with the Guerreros de Oaxaca of the Mexican Baseball League. He was released on July 26, 2011.

=== Sugar Land Skeeters ===
On April 19, 2013, Aquino signed with the Sugar Land Skeeters of the Atlantic League of Professional Baseball. He became a free agent at the end of the season.
