= Victor Santos (football administrator) =

Andorran football official (born 1953)

Victor Santos (Full name: Víctor Manuel Domingos Dos Santos; born 7 November 1953) is an Andorran football official. Originally from Estoril, Cascais, Portugal, he immigrated to Andorra in 1975. He is an Andorran citizen.

Victor Santos has been the President of the Andorran Football Federation FAF (Catalan: Federació Andorrana de Futbol) since October 2013 as successor of Antoni Giribet. Before that time, since 2005, he was the federation's Vice President. He was with the federation for a total of 18 years prior to becoming the President.

Furthermore, he is a former coach and sports Director of the FC Encamp.
