= Johnny Estrada =

American baseball player (born 1976)

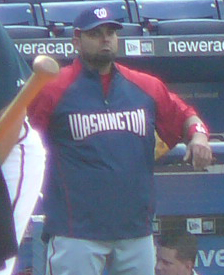
- Estrada with the Nationals in 2008
- Catcher
- Born: June 27, 1976 (age 50); Hayward, California, U.S.
- Batted: Switch Threw: Right

MLB debut
- May 15, 2001, for the Philadelphia Phillies

Last MLB appearance
- July 24, 2008, for the Washington Nationals

MLB statistics
- Batting average: .277
- Home runs: 42
- Runs batted in: 285
- Stats at Baseball Reference

Teams
- Philadelphia Phillies (2001–2002); Atlanta Braves (2003–2005); Arizona Diamondbacks (2006); Milwaukee Brewers (2007); Washington Nationals (2008)

Career highlights and awards
- All-Star (2004); Silver Slugger Award (2004)

Johnny Pulado Estrada III (born June 27, 1976) is an American former professional baseball catcher, who played in Major League Baseball (MLB) for the Philadelphia Phillies, Atlanta Braves, Arizona Diamondbacks, Milwaukee Brewers, and Washington Nationals.

Estrada was selected in the 17th round of the 1997 Major League Baseball draft by the Philadelphia Phillies. His major league career started in 2001 with the Phillies after an injury to the regular starting catcher, Mike Lieberthal. In 2002, he became a part-time player. Estrada was acquired by the Atlanta Braves from the Phillies on December 20, 2002, for Kevin Millwood in a move that was said to be financially motivated, since the Braves could not pay Millwood's salary. During the 2003 season, Estrada spent most of the year on Atlanta's Triple-A team, the Richmond Braves. After Javy López left due to free agency, Estrada became Atlanta's starting catcher in 2004. He hit .314 with 9 home runs and 76 RBI. Estrada also made the All-Star team and helped Atlanta win their 13th division title in a row. After a slightly disappointing 2005 season, Estrada was traded by the Braves to the Arizona Diamondbacks for pitchers Lance Cormier and Óscar Villarreal on December 7, 2005.

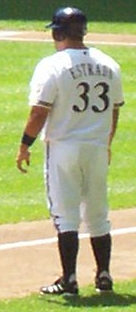
Estrada during his time with the Brewers

The 2006 season saw Estrada return to his All-Star form. He hit .302 with 11 home runs and 71 RBI in 115 games. After the 2006 season, Estrada was traded to the Milwaukee Brewers along with pitchers Claudio Vargas and Greg Aquino for pitchers Doug Davis and Dana Eveland and outfielder Dave Krynzel.

On November 20, 2007, Estrada was traded from the Brewers to the New York Mets for pitcher Guillermo Mota. Estrada was not offered a new contract by the Mets and became a free agent on December 12, 2007. On January 31, 2008, Estrada signed a one-year contract with the Washington Nationals worth approximately $1.25 million. On July 24, Estrada was designated for assignment, and released on July 31.

Estrada holds the major league record for most career hits without a triple (576).
