= Gary Glover =

American baseball player (born 1976)

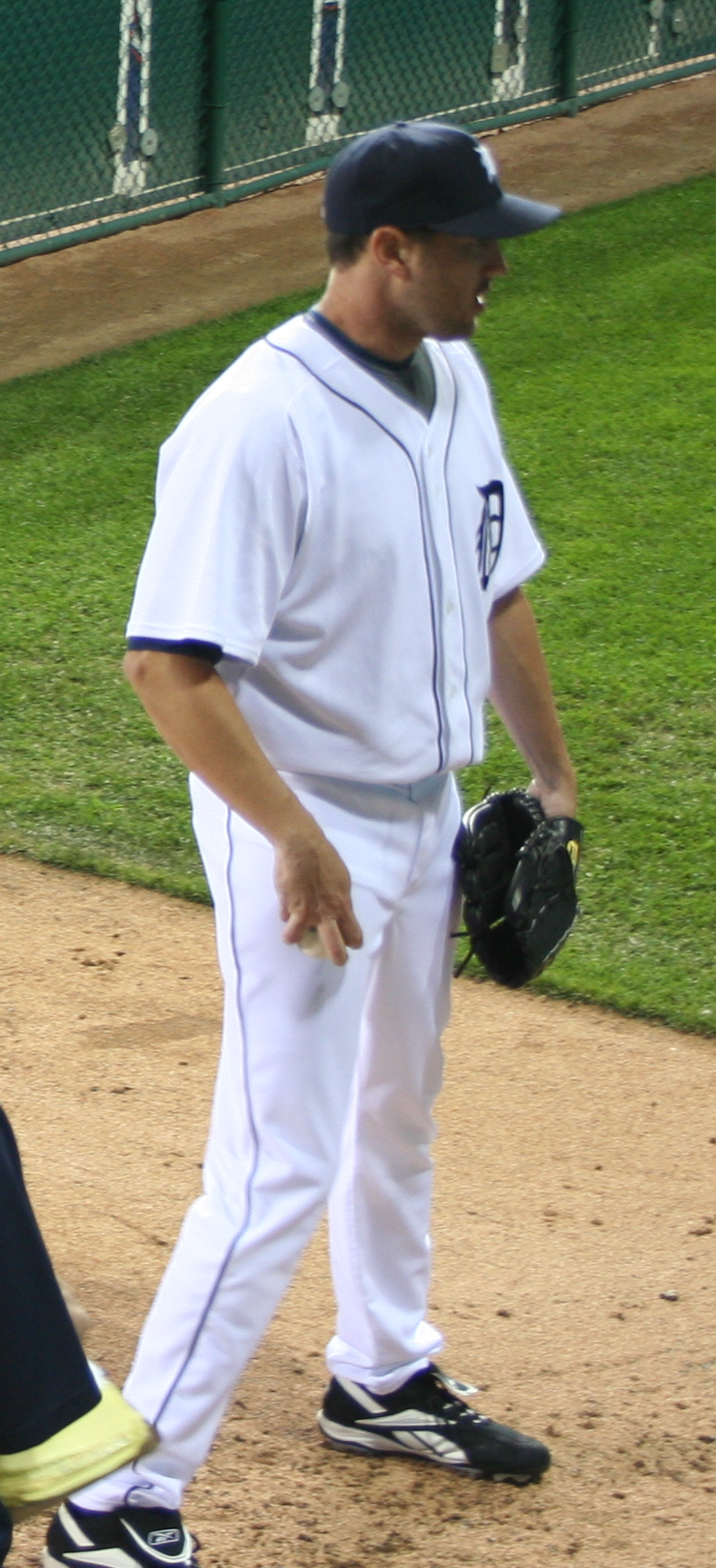
- Pitcher
- Born: December 3, 1976 (age 48); Cleveland, Ohio, U.S.
- Batted: Right Threw: Right

Professional debut
- MLB: September 30, 1999, for the Toronto Blue Jays
- NPB: April 2, 2006, for the Yomiuri Giants
- KBO: June 26, 2009, for the SK Wyverns

Last appearance
- MLB: September 29, 2008, for the Detroit Tigers
- NPB: October 14, 2006, for the Yomiuri Giants
- KBO: October 1, 2011, for the SK Wyverns

MLB statistics
- Win–loss record: 29–26
- Earned run average: 5.03
- Strikeouts: 324
- Stats at Baseball Reference

Teams
- Toronto Blue Jays (1999); Chicago White Sox (2001–2003); Anaheim Angels (2003); Milwaukee Brewers (2004–2005); Yomiuri Giants (2006); Tampa Bay Devil Rays / Rays (2007–2008); Detroit Tigers (2008); SK Wyverns (2009–2011)

Career highlights and awards
- Korean Series champion (2010)

John Gary Glover (born December 3, 1976) is an American former professional baseball pitcher. He had a career major league ERA of 5.03 over eight seasons, including time spent with the Anaheim Angels, Chicago White Sox, Detroit Tigers, Milwaukee Brewers, Tampa Bay Devil Rays/Rays and Toronto Blue Jays, who selected Glover in the 15th round of the 1994 Major League Baseball draft. He also played for the Yomiuri Giants of Nippon Professional Baseball and the Sydney Storm of the Australian Baseball League.

== Career ==
=== Toronto Blue Jays ===
The Blue Jays drafted Glover right out of high school in DeLand, Florida, selecting him the 15th round of the 1994 draft. Glover spent the next three seasons (1994–1996) playing for rookie-level minor affiliates; the Gulf Coast Blue Jays from 1994 to 1995 and the Medicine Hat Blue Jays in 1996. In those years Glover worked as a starter but had a spotty record. At Medicine Hat he posted a 3–12 record with a 7.75 ERA. Promoted the next year to the Single-A Hagerstown Suns Glover reduced his ERA to 3.73 but won only six games in twenty-eight starts. In 1998 Toronto promoted Glover to the High-A Dunedin Blue Jays where his record finally improved. In eighteen starts he was 7–6 with an ERA of 4.28.

Toward the end of the 1998 season Toronto had promoted Glover to the Double-A Knoxville Smokies but he immediately struggled, losing five games without registering a single win and seeing his ERA skyrocket to 6.75. In 1999 however Glover pitched to an 8–2 record with Knoxville and made the Southern League All-Star team before being promoted mid-season to the Triple-A Syracuse SkyChiefs. At Syracuse Glover went 4–6 with a 5.19 ERA; he also developed a notable pitching rivalry against Ottawa Lynx pitcher Shayne Bennett, against whom he pitched three times (Glover won twice). Called up at the end of the season Glover made his major league debut with the Blue Jays on September 30, 1999, throwing one inning of no-hit shutout ball amid a 9–2 loss to the Cleveland Indians.

Glover did not join the Blue Jays for the 2000 season, spending the year at Knoxville where he put together a strong winning streak but overall went 9–9 with a 5.02 ERA. On November 7, 2000 Toronto traded Glover to the Chicago White Sox for left-handed relief pitcher Scott Eyre.

=== Chicago White Sox ===
Over the 2000–2001 winter Glover played in the Venezuelan Winter League, where he and former SkyChiefs teammate John Bale were robbed by a man with a shotgun. Unfazed, Glover finished out the season in Venezuela, commenting that the experience made him realize that "this game is only going to be kind to you for so many years, so you've got to try to make the best of the game when you're in it." Glover opened the 2001 and got off to a strong start; retiring the first sixteen hitters he faced and picking up his first major league victory on April 11 in relief of Jim Parque against Cleveland. After a rocky May Chicago demoted Glover to the Triple-A Charlotte Knights, but he returned to the team in mid-June after posting a 1.88 ERA in six starts. On July 27 Glover made his first career major league start in place of the just-traded James Baldwin; like his debut and first win, it came against the Cleveland Indians. Glover allowed two hits in 3 1/3 innings but did not figure in the decision. Glover finished out the year at Chicago with a 5–5 record and a 4.93 ERA in 46 appearances, including 11 starts.

Between the 2001 and 2002 seasons there was speculation that Glover would be part of the starting rotation, but Opening Day found him in the bullpen. Out of the bullpen he had an ERA of 1.15 by the third week of June, but his ERA as a starter was well over 6. Glover eventually made 22 starts in 2002, but Chicago manager Jerry Manuel moved him back to the bullpen in mid-September and indicated that Glover would pitch in relief in 2003 as well. Glover accepted the decision but indicated a desire to return to the rotation. On the year Glover was 7–8 with a 5.20 ERA.

Glover opened the 2003 season with the White Sox but was little used, making just 24 appearances by the end of the July. During one stretch Glover went 19 days between appearances. On July 30 the Sox traded Glover along with minor-leaguers Scott Dunn and Tim Bittner to the Anaheim Angels for veteran pitcher Scott Schoeneweis.

=== Anaheim Angels ===
Glover worked in relief for the Angels and made 18 appearances, going 1–0 with 5.00 ERA and nearly equaling his playing time with Chicago that year. At the end of the season the Angels sent him outright to the Salt Lake Stingers. In December Glover was granted his release and signed a minor-league contract with the Chicago Cubs.

=== Around the minors ===
At the start of the 2004 season Glover was a candidate to fill a spot in the bullpen left open by the injured Mike Remlinger but started the year with the Triple-A Iowa Cubs after a terrible spring training. Glover made 20 appearances for the Iowa team, all but one in relief, going 3–2 with a 7.93 ERA. Exercising an option in his contract Glover was released from the Cubs and signed with the Rochester Red Wings, the Triple-A affiliate of the Minnesota Twins. There he continued to struggle, with an ERA of 8.44, and was released in mid-July to make room for Matt Guerrier. As Glover tells it, he had more or less given up on the 2004 season. Returning to the Tampa area, he "figured the season was over...I planned to go down to Florida for a while and help out the hurricane relief effort there, then go to winter ball and try to figure some things out." Glover was mulling various Independent League teams when on July 25 the Milwaukee Brewers offered him a contract.

=== Milwaukee Brewers ===
Glover joined the Triple-A Indianapolis Indians and rediscovered his control, going 3–3 with a 3.98 ERA. At the end of the minor league season the Brewers recalled Glover to the major leagues, his first appearance there since the end of the 2003 season. Glover appeared in four games, starting three of them, and went 2–1 with a 3.50 ERA. After a strong spring training Glover began the 2005 season as Milwaukee's fifth starter. Glover went 3–3 in his first nine starts but lost his spot in the starting rotation at the end of May to Wes Obermueller. Brewers manager Ned Yost cited Obermueller's hot streak: "I'm going with what amounts to the hot hand even though Glover pitches great the last time...Gary's done everything we've asked of him but Obermueller is starting to come on." As in Chicago, Glover was disappointed. The move was not a success: Obermueller was rocked in two successive starts, while Glover was hit hard in relief and sent down to the Triple-A Nashville Sounds in early June to make room for backup catcher Julio Mosquera.

At Nashville Glover went 6–4 with a 3.03 in 16 starts; the Brewers recalled him in September to place a struggling Obermueller. In his final start of the year Glover pitched seven shutout innings in a 2–0 victory over the Cincinnati Reds, striking out a career-high ten. The victory left the Brewers 80–79; they finished the season 81–81, the first time since 1992 that the team had finished at or above .500. On November 30, the Brewers released Glover, who signed with the Yomiuri Giants of Nippon Professional Baseball.

=== Yomiuri Giants ===
Glover spent the entire 2006 season with the Giants, where he amassed a 5–7 record with a 4.97 ERA, primarily as a starter. Glover did not find the transition to Japanese baseball difficult and was full of praise for his new team: "I realize the Giants are a great organization, and I feel fortunate to be playing for Yomiuri." The Giants kept him on a seven-day rotation, and as a consequence of starting on Sundays acquired the nickname "Mr. Sunday." At the end of the season Glover returned to the United States and signed a minor league contract with the Tampa Bay Devil Rays.

=== Tampa Bay Devil Rays ===
Glover signed with Tampa Bay for several reasons: he wanted to return to the United States, it was close to his off-season home of Lutz, Florida, and after a year in Japan he believed he was ready to break into the big leagues for good. Reflected Glover ruefully: "I've always been a fifth starter or the last bullpen guy, which always made it difficult for me." Glover made the team and worked out of the bullpen and by the middle of the season he had earned a reputation for reliability. In a notable appearance July 30 against the Boston Red Sox he recorded the final seven outs on fifty pitches to complete a 5–2 win. Glover finished the season 6–5 with a 4.89 ERA and two saves.

Glover returned to the re-christened Tampa Bay Rays for 2008 but was bedeviled by tendinitis in his shoulder and an injury to his left calf. On July 29, the Rays designated Glover for assignment. Manager Joe Maddon expressed regret: "There's just no room in the inn right now...There's no real complicated explanation. I like him and he fits in well here." On August 2, the Rays released Glover.

=== Detroit Tigers ===
Glover signed with the Detroit Tigers who assigned him to the Triple-A Toledo Mud Hens on August 9, 2008. The Tigers called up Glover on August 17, 2008 to replace the injured Todd Jones; Glover had not allowed a run in three appearances with the Mud Hens. Glover made his debut for the Tigers on August 18, 2008 in relief of Kenny Rogers against the Texas Rangers; he pitched a 1-2-3 inning and struck out a batter.

Glover became a free agent on October 30, 2008 after electing free agency. In 18 appearances, he went 1–1 with a 4.43 ERA.

=== Washington Nationals ===
In January 2009, Glover signed a minor league contract with the Washington Nationals. He attended the Nationals 2009 spring training camp but was sent back to the minors on March 31, 2009. Glover joined the Triple-A Syracuse Chiefs which marked a sort of homecoming: nine years previous, he had pitched for the Chiefs, then the SkyChiefs and an affiliate of the Toronto Blue Jays. He was released on May 9, 2009, to make room for Mike MacDougal.

=== Florida Marlins ===
On May 26, 2009, Glover signed a minor league contract with the Florida Marlins.

=== SK Wyverns ===
On June 21, 2009, Glover signed with SK Wyverns in South Korea, with whom he won the 2010 Korean Series on October 19, 2010. Glover started for the Wyverns in the deciding Game 4, in which the Wyverns defeated the Samsung Lions 4–2.

=== Miami Marlins ===
Glover signed a minor league contract with the Miami Marlins on January 22, 2012. He also received an invitation to spring training.

== Personal life ==
Glover currently resides in Lutz, Florida with his wife, son and daughter.
