= Dave Krynzel =

American baseball player (born 1981)

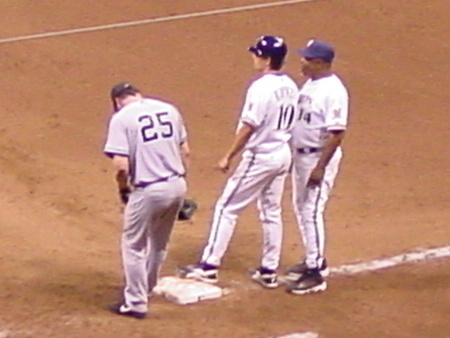
- Krynzel (center) in 2005
- Outfielder
- Born: November 7, 1981 (age 44); Dayton, Ohio, U.S.
- Batted: Left Threw: Left

MLB debut
- September 1, 2004, for the Milwaukee Brewers

Last MLB appearance
- June 10, 2005, for the Milwaukee Brewers

MLB statistics
- Batting average: .188
- Home runs: 0
- Runs batted in: 3
- Stats at Baseball Reference

Teams
- Milwaukee Brewers (2004–2005)
Medals
Men's baseball
Representing United States
World Junior Baseball Championship
Gold medal – first place	1999 Kaohsiung	Team

David Benjamin Krynzel (born November 7, 1981) is an American former Major League Baseball outfielder. He made his major league debut on September 1, 2004.

Krynzel was drafted in the 1st round (11th overall) of the 2000 Major League Baseball draft and spent seven years in the Milwaukee Brewers farm system before being traded to the Arizona Diamondbacks on November 25, 2006, with Doug Davis and Dana Eveland for Johnny Estrada, Greg Aquino, and Claudio Vargas. On April 8, 2008, the Diamondbacks released him. He signed a minor league contract with the Baltimore Orioles in December 2008.
