= Jimmy Journell =

American baseball player (born 1977)

- Pitcher
- Born: December 29, 1977 (age 48); Springfield, Ohio, U.S.
- Batted: Right Threw: Right

MLB debut
- June 29, 2003, for the St. Louis Cardinals

Last MLB appearance
- May 2, 2005, for the St. Louis Cardinals

MLB statistics
- Win–loss record: 0–1
- Earned run average: 7.43
- Strikeouts: 13
- Stats at Baseball Reference

Teams
- St. Louis Cardinals (2003, 2005)

James Richard Journell (born December 29, 1977) is an American former Major League Baseball pitcher who played for the St. Louis Cardinals in 2003 and 2005.

== Amateur career ==
Journell was born in Springfield, Ohio. He graduated from North High School and attended the University of Illinois at Urbana–Champaign. In 1998, he played collegiate summer baseball with the Cotuit Kettleers of the Cape Cod Baseball League.

== Professional career ==
Journell was selected by the St. Louis Cardinals in the 4th round of the 1999 MLB draft, and was selected for the US team in the 2002 All-Star Futures Game. He was once a highly regarded prospect in the Cardinals' minor league system (even considered the team's best prospect according to Baseball America), but had control and injury problems in the Major Leagues. After posting an earned run average (ERA) of 6.00 in seven games in 2003, Journell suffered a right shoulder injury in 2004, forcing him to undergo season-ending surgery. In 2005, his record was 0–1 with a 10.38 ERA in five appearances for the Cardinals.

On December 1, 2005, he signed a minor league contract with the Cincinnati Reds, but was later released on March 20, 2006. He spent the 2006 season with the Bridgeport Bluefish of the Atlantic League of Professional Baseball.
