= José Capellán =

Dominican baseball player (1981–2015)

- Pitcher
- Born: January 13, 1981; Cotui, Dominican Republic
- Died: April 7, 2015 (aged 34); Philadelphia, Pennsylvania, U.S.
- Batted: Right Threw: Right

Professional debut
- MLB: September 12, 2004, for the Atlanta Braves
- KBO: March 27, 2010, for the Hanwha Eagles

Last appearance
- MLB: April 26, 2008, for the Colorado Rockies
- KBO: June 16, 2010, for the Hanwha Eagles

MLB statistics
- Win–loss record: 5–7
- Earned run average: 4.89
- Strikeouts: 98

KBO statistics
- Win–loss record: 0–11
- Earned run average: 9.15
- Strikeouts: 33
- Stats at Baseball Reference

Teams
- Atlanta Braves (2004); Milwaukee Brewers (2005–2007); Detroit Tigers (2007); Colorado Rockies (2008); Hanwha Eagles (2010)

José Francisco Capellán (January 13, 1981 – April 7, 2015) was a Dominican professional baseball pitcher. He played in Major League Baseball from 2004 to 2008 for the Atlanta Braves, Milwaukee Brewers, Detroit Tigers and Colorado Rockies. He also played with the Hanhwa Eagles of the KBO League.

== Career ==
In 2004, Capellán pitched at Single-A, Double-A, and Triple-A and posted a combined 14–5 mark with a 2.80 earned run average (ERA). In three games with the Atlanta Braves after a September call-up in 2004, Capellán compiled a 0–1 record with an 11.25 ERA in eight innings pitched.

The Braves traded Capellán and Alec Zumwalt to the Milwaukee Brewers for all-star reliever Dan Kolb.

Capellán opened the 2005 season with the Triple-A Nashville Sounds, and was called up to Brewers major league club, where he worked relief through the 2005 season. At the end of spring training in 2007, he was sent back to Triple-A after a poor spring. Capellán demanded a trade and even considered retirement. His wish eventually came true on July 1, 2007, when he was traded to the Detroit Tigers for minor league pitcher Chris Cody.

Capellán was traded from Detroit to the Rockies in exchange for pitcher Denny Bautista on December 4, 2007. On May 5, 2008, Capellán was released by the Rockies after being designated for assignment. In late June, Capellán signed a minor league contract with the Kansas City Royals and became a free agent after the season.

Capellán signed a minor league contract with the Houston Astros on January 14, 2009, and was invited to spring training.

The Hanhwa Eagles, a Korean professional baseball club, revealed their acquisition of Capellán on December 10, 2009. Capellán was considered to be a starter for the Eagles in 2010 and scheduled to make $250,000 a year. He was released from the Eagles on August 5, 2010.

In between, Capellan pitched winterball with the Gigantes del Cibao and the Toros del Este in Dominican Republic, and for the Tigres de Aragua in Venezuela, where he made his last professional appearance in 2013.

== Death ==
Capellán died of a heart attack at home in Philadelphia on April 7, 2015, aged 34. Capellán's wife said that he had problems with the drug Ambien, which is used for sleeping disorders.
