= Julián Tavárez =

Dominican baseball player (born 1973)

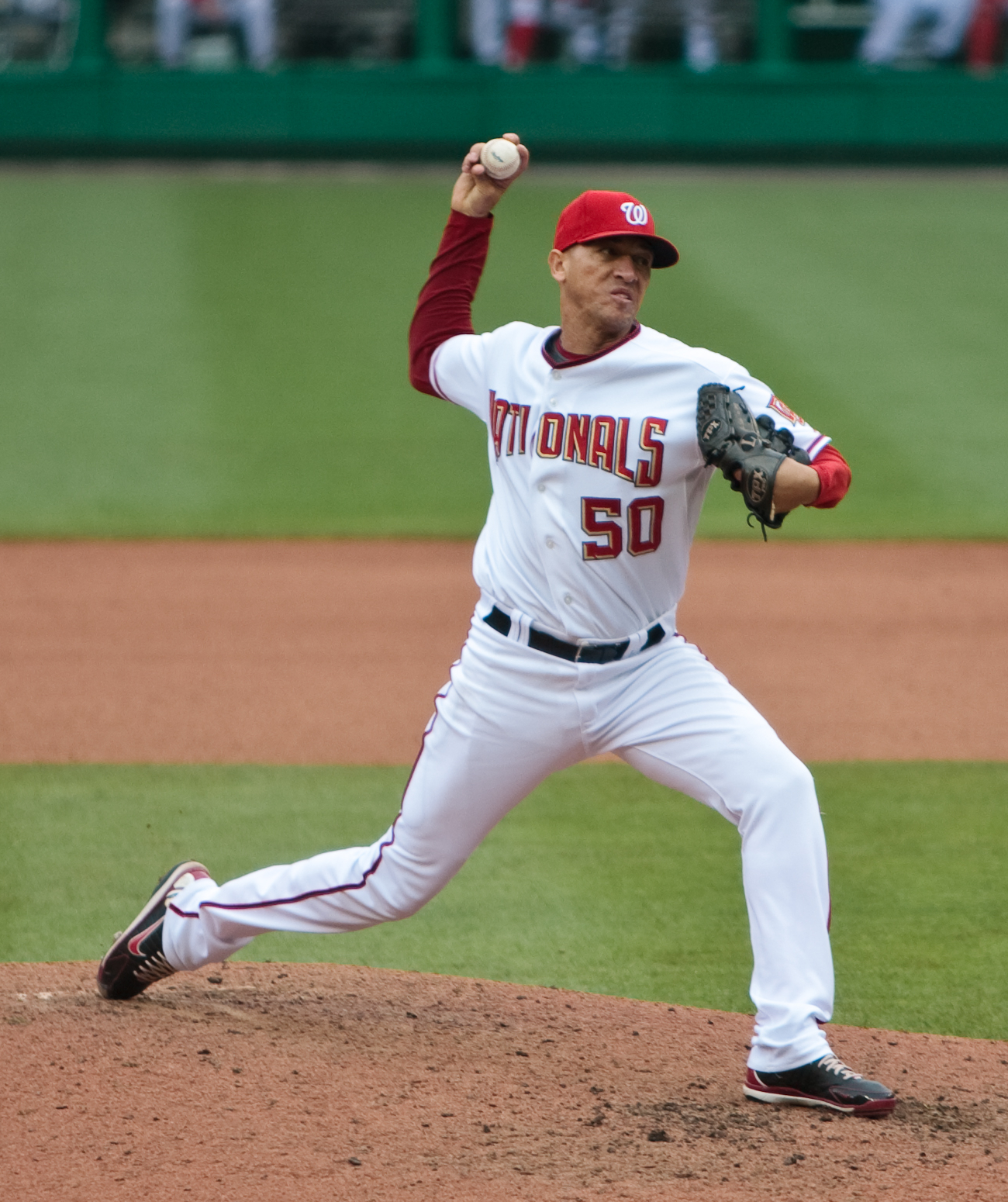
- Tavarez with the Washington Nationals
- Pitcher
- Born: May 22, 1973 (age 53); Santiago de los Caballeros, Dominican Republic
- Batted: Left Threw: Right

MLB debut
- August 7, 1993, for the Cleveland Indians

Last MLB appearance
- July 19, 2009, for the Washington Nationals

MLB statistics
- Win–loss record: 88–82
- Earned run average: 4.46
- Strikeouts: 842
- Stats at Baseball Reference

Teams
- Cleveland Indians (1993–1996); San Francisco Giants (1997–1999); Colorado Rockies (2000); Chicago Cubs (2001); Florida Marlins (2002); Pittsburgh Pirates (2003); St. Louis Cardinals (2004–2005); Boston Red Sox (2006–2008); Milwaukee Brewers (2008); Atlanta Braves (2008); Washington Nationals (2009)

Member of the Caribbean

Baseball Hall of Fame
- Induction: 2024

Julián Tavárez Carmen (born May 22, 1973) is a Dominican former professional baseball pitcher. He played for 11 franchises over the course of a 17–season Major League Baseball (MLB) career from 1993 to 2009. Listed at 6 feet 2 inches (1.88 m) and 165 pounds (75 kg), he threw right-handed and batted left-handed.

== Career ==
=== Minor leagues (1990–1993) ===
Tavárez began his professional career on March 16, 1990, signing a minor league contract with the Cleveland Indians organization. For two years, he was a starter for the Dominican Summer League Indians. In 1991, he joined the Class A Burlington Indians where he led the league in shutouts and hit batsmen. Tavárez progressed rapidly the following year, playing in Kinston, Canton-Akron, and finally with the Cleveland Indians. He was named the Indians' 1994 Minor League Player of the Year (receiving the "Lou Boudreau Award").

=== Cleveland Indians (1993–1996) ===
Tavarez made his major league debut on August 6, 1993, and earned his first win on August 14, against the Texas Rangers. During his time in Canton-Akron, Tavárez won Carolina League Player of the Year honors and was named the league's top prospect by Baseball America. Tavárez was demoted to Triple-A Charlotte in 1994, where he led the International League in wins. He did make one spot start for Cleveland that year. Tavárez was sent to the bullpen in 1995, which was a breakout year for him. He was first in wins, third in innings pitched, and fifth in ERA among American League relief pitchers and threw 4.1 scoreless innings against the Atlanta Braves in the World Series. Tavárez was the Sporting News American League Rookie of the Year, but finished sixth in the ballot by the Baseball Writers' Association of America. The 1996 season was Tavárez' final year with Cleveland. He was suspended for three days after a brawl in Milwaukee and spent two weeks in Triple-A Buffalo before appearing in the ALDS.

=== San Francisco Giants (1997–1999) ===
Tavárez was traded to the San Francisco Giants on November 13, 1996, along with infielders Jeff Kent and José Vizcaíno and a player to be named (pitcher Joe Roa) in exchange for third baseman Matt Williams and a player to be named (outfielder Trenidad Hubbard). In his first year with the club, Tavárez led the National League with 89 appearances, while also setting a club record in the statistic. He had a stretch of 24 consecutive scoreless games and appeared in all three games of the NLDS against the Florida Marlins. Tavárez recorded his first save on May 14, 1998, with a three-inning outing against the Montreal Expos. He also was placed on the disabled list for the first time after straining a latissimus dorsi muscle and received his second suspension after an argument with umpire Sam Holbrook. Tavárez again appeared on the disabled list in 1999 due to pneumonia and had two minor league stints.

=== Colorado Rockies (2000) ===
Tavárez was claimed off waivers by the Colorado Rockies on November 21, 1999. The next day, he signed a one-year, $1.2 million deal with the Rockies for the 2000 season. He recorded one of two career major league complete games with a four-hitter against the Chicago Cubs and went on to post an NL best nine-game win streak on his way to a career high 11 wins.

=== Chicago Cubs (2001) ===
Tavárez signed as a free agent with the Chicago Cubs on November 16, 2000, and set career highs in innings, strikeouts, and games started after returning to a full-time starting role. On April 11, he executed a safety squeeze to record his first RBI. He was suspended from April 29 to May 4 for his part in a bench clearing brawl against the Giants. On May 5, Tavárez won a 20–1 decision against the Los Angeles Dodgers. He then recorded his first multi-hit game against Pittsburgh on July 24. On October 6, against the Pittsburgh Pirates, Tavárez struck out nine hitters and took a no-hitter into the eighth inning before it was broken up by Mendy López.

=== Florida Marlins (2002) ===
Tavárez was acquired by the Florida Marlins on March 27, 2002, along with minor league pitchers Jose Cueto and Dontrelle Willis and catcher Ryan Jorgensen in exchange for pitchers Antonio Alfonseca and Matt Clement. On May 16, he chose to pitch with a shoulder injury and allowed a career high ten earned runs. It began a stretch of five consecutive losses. He allowed 25 runs and a .391 opponents' batting average in the first inning.

=== Pittsburgh Pirates (2003) ===
Tavárez was relegated to bullpen duty in 2003 after being signed by the Pittsburgh Pirates as a minor league free agent on January 28. During the season, he compiled a streak of 14.1 consecutive scoreless innings and ended the season with a career-high 11 saves, allowing only nine of 35 inherited runners to score.

=== St. Louis Cardinals (2004–2005) ===
Tavárez signed a two-year contract with the St. Louis Cardinals on January 9, 2004. He earned his first win with St. Louis against the Cincinnati Reds, striking out the side in the 10th inning, and went on to surpass 1,000 career innings pitched in August.

Tavárez was ejected from a game against the Pirates on August 20, 2004, after an accusation of having a "foreign substance" on his cap. He served an eight-day suspension for the incident.

Tavárez posted a 2.61 ERA in nine postseason games, but suffered breaks in his left ring finger and fifth metacarpal after punching a bullpen phone in the dugout following being removed from Game 4 of the NLCS. He had allowed a solo home run to Carlos Beltrán, issued two walks, and hit a batter. Tavárez played the rest of the 2004 postseason with a protective wrap in his glove, and when the glove was removed his hand was noticeably swollen. Tavárez suffered the loss against the Boston Red Sox in Game 1 of the 2004 World Series, giving up the game-winning home run to Mark Bellhorn in the eighth inning.

=== Boston Red Sox (2006–2008) ===
A free agent following the 2005 season, Tavárez agreed to a two-year, $6.7 million deal with the Boston Red Sox on January 18, 2006.

On March 27, 2006, Tavárez was suspended for the first ten games of his Red Sox career as a result of a fistfight that broke out between him and Tampa Bay Devil Rays outfielder Joey Gathright during a spring training game. Although he had a poor year as a relief pitcher, injuries forced the Sox to use him as a starter for the last few weeks of the season. In 6 starts, he went 3–0 with a 4.01 ERA, and recorded his second complete game in a 7–1 win against the Toronto Blue Jays.

On March 22, 2007, teammate Jonathan Papelbon was named the team's closer, and Tavárez took his spot in the rotation. During a game in May 2007, Tavárez wore shoes emblazoned with the likeness of his teammate David Ortiz. In spring training, it had been assumed that Tavárez was simply holding the fifth spot in the rotation for the Red Sox top pitching prospect Jon Lester while he recovered from cancer. However, with Lester struggling in Triple-A and Tavárez pitching well, he kept his spot in the rotation through the All-Star break. After a stretch of poor starts, 0–4 with a 7.79 ERA, he was moved to the bullpen on July 22, 2007, and replaced in the rotation by Lester.

Tavárez called the 2007 Red Sox pitching staff the best he's ever been associated with. While he was not on Boston's postseason roster, he received a World Series ring following Boston's sweep of the Colorado Rockies in the 2007 World Series.

On May 11, 2008, Tavárez was designated for assignment. He later accepted an assignment to the Triple-A Pawtucket Red Sox even though he could have opted for free agency. Later that month, he was released.

=== Milwaukee Brewers (2008) ===
On May 27, 2008, Tavárez signed a contract with the Milwaukee Brewers for the remainder of the 2008 season. On June 19, Tavárez was designated for assignment, and rejected an outright assignment to the minors, opting instead to be released from his contract.

=== Atlanta Braves (2008) ===
Tavárez signed a contract with the Atlanta Braves on July 8, 2008, for the remainder of the 2008 season. On that day, he made his Braves debut against the Los Angeles Dodgers. He pitched one-third of an inning and gave up two runs, one earned.

=== Washington Nationals (2009) ===
On March 13, 2009, Tavárez signed a minor league contract with the Washington Nationals and was invited to Spring Training. When asked why he chose to sign with the Nationals, Tavárez acknowledged he had no other options: "Why did I sign with the Nationals? When you go to a club at 4 in the morning, and you're just waiting, waiting, a 600-pounder looks like J-Lo. And to me, this is Jennifer Lopez right here. It's 4 in the morning. Too much to drink. So, Nationals: Jennifer Lopez to me." On July 19, 2009, Tavárez was designated for assignment by the Nationals. He was eventually released on July 29.

=== Retirement ===
After playing baseball for 19 years, at the minor and major league level, Tavárez decided to retire in 2009.

== See also ==
- List of Major League Baseball career hit batsmen leaders
