= Matt Wise =

American baseball player and coach (born 1975)

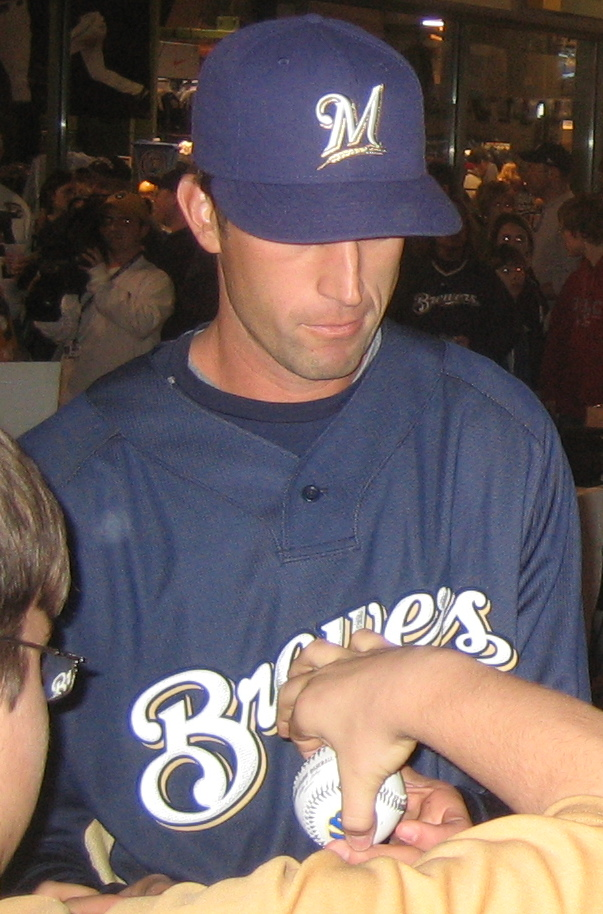
- Wise with the Milwaukee Brewers in 2007

Chicago White Sox – No. 53
- Pitcher / Coach
- Born: November 18, 1975 (age 50); Montclair, California, U.S.
- Batted: Right Threw: Right

MLB debut
- August 2, 2000, for the Anaheim Angels

Last MLB appearance
- May 26, 2008, for the New York Mets

MLB statistics
- Win–loss record: 17–22
- Earned run average: 4.23
- Strikeouts: 244
- Stats at Baseball Reference

Teams
- As player: Anaheim Angels (2000–2002); Milwaukee Brewers (2004–2007); New York Mets (2008); As coach: Los Angeles Angels (2020–2023); Chicago White Sox (2024–present)

Matthew John Wise (born November 18, 1975) is an American professional baseball coach and former pitcher. He played in Major League Baseball (MLB) for the Anaheim Angels, Milwaukee Brewers, and New York Mets. He was the pitching coach for the Angels from 2021 to 2023 after serving as their bullpen coach in 2020. Since 2024, he has been the current bullpen coach for the Chicago White Sox.

== Career ==
=== Playing career ===
Wise attended Pepperdine University and Cal State Fullerton. In 1995, he played collegiate summer baseball in the Cape Cod Baseball League for the Yarmouth-Dennis Red Sox.

Wise was drafted by the Anaheim Angels in the sixth round of the 1997 MLB draft. He made his MLB debut on August 2, 2000 with the Angels. After missing the entire 2003 season due to injury, he was released by the Angels and signed with the Milwaukee Brewers. The New York Mets signed Wise to a one-year contract on December 18, 2007.

In 209 career appearances, he had an earned run average (ERA) of 4.23. His two best pitches were an 89-92 mile per hour fastball and a changeup that used deceptive arm action.

=== Retirement ===
Wise announced his retirement from MLB at the age of 33 on March 6, 2009.

=== Coaching career ===
On January 1, 2020, Wise was named the bullpen coach for the Los Angeles Angels. On February 16, 2021, Wise was named the interim pitching coach of the Angels. On October 26, 2023, Wise joined the Chicago White Sox as their bullpen coach.
