= Julio Mosquera =

Panamanian baseball player (born 1972)

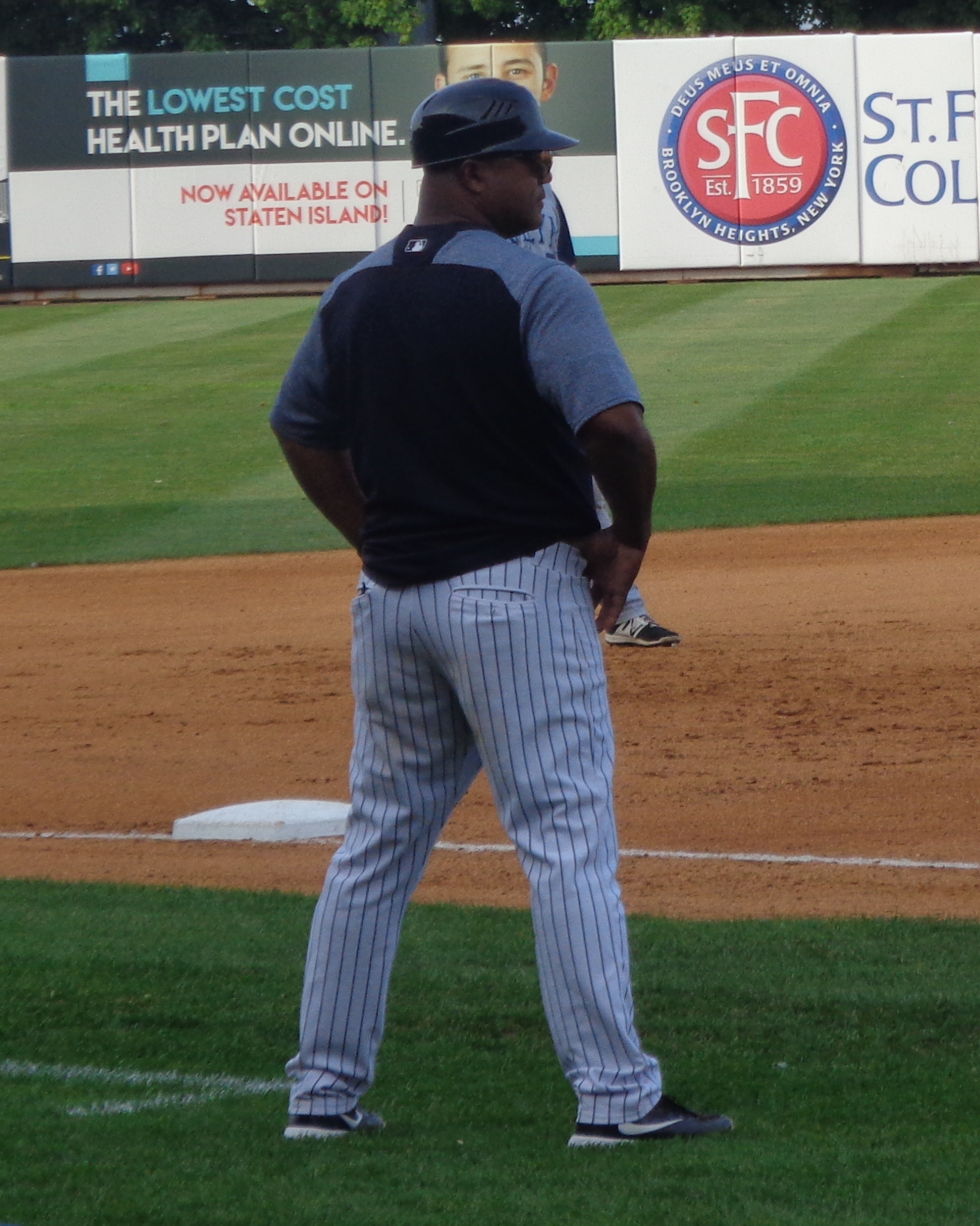
- Mosquera with the Staten Island Yankees in 2017
- Catcher
- Born: January 29, 1972 (age 54); Panama City, Panama
- Batted: Right Threw: Right

MLB debut
- August 17, 1996, for the Toronto Blue Jays

Last MLB appearance
- June 8, 2005, for the Milwaukee Brewers

MLB statistics
- Batting average: .226
- Home runs: 0
- Runs batted in: 2
- Stats at Baseball Reference

Teams
- Toronto Blue Jays (1996–1997); Milwaukee Brewers (2005)

Julio Alberto Mosquera Cervantes (born January 29, 1972) is a Panamanian professional baseball player and coach. Mosquera is currently the acting manager of the Charlotte Knights. He played in Major League Baseball as a catcher for the Toronto Blue Jays (1996–1997) and Milwaukee Brewers (2005).

== Playing career ==
Mosquera signed with the Blue Jays as an amateur free agent in 1991, and in 1993 he made his American debut with the GCL Blue Jays. Mosquera spoke no English at the time, making mundane tasks such as ordering food challenging for him. He was called up to the majors on August 17, 1996, after Blue Jays catcher Sandy Martinez suffered a sprained ankle in a game against the Minnesota Twins and was placed on the disabled list. He also appeared in three games with the Blue Jays in April of the following year. Mosquera's final stint in the major leagues came with the Milwaukee Brewers on June 6, 2005, as a temporary replacement for catcher Damian Miller, who had suffered a strained groin.

Over his 12 games in the major leagues, Mosquera had 31 at bats, 2 runs, 7 hits, 3 doubles, 2 RBI, .226 batting average, .250 on-base percentage, .323 slugging percentage and 10 total bases.

== Coaching career ==
Mosquera worked as a minor league manager for the Staten Island Yankees, and then moved up to the Class-A Charleston RiverDogs of the South Atlantic League. He previously served as a catching coach where he instructed Austin Romine and Jesús Montero.

Mosquera served as the manager for the Astronautas de Chiriquí, the team representing Panama, during the 2020 Caribbean Series. The Astronautas finished with a record of 1 – 4, and did not advance to the knockout stage.

On January 27, 2020, the Yankees announced that Mosquera would become the manager for the class Double-A Trenton Thunder. However, he never ended up assuming those duties, as the 2020 minor league baseball season was cancelled due to the COVID-19 pandemic, and the Yankees subsequently ended their affiliation with Trenton in favor of the Somerset Patriots. Instead, Mosquera served under Aaron Boone as part of the coaching staff of the Yankees during the 2020 season. Mosquera managed the Double-A Somerset Patriots in 2021.

Mosquera joined the Chicago White Sox organization as a catching instructor before the 2022 season. On May 20, the White Sox put Wes Helms, the manager of the Triple-A Charlotte Knights, on an indefinite leave of absence and named Mosquera the acting manager of the Knights.
