= Antoni Giribet =

Andorran footballer and activist

Antoni Giribet Fiter (born 31 December 1965) is an Andorran association football player and activist.

== Football player career ==
At age 17 he signed a contract with FC Andorra. He played in that club for three years and later he became administrator with an electrical company and moved to UE Sant Julià. For a few years he was a player-president of that club.

== Football activist career ==
After ending his playing career he was still a president of UE Sant Julià. He left the club when he was made a president of the Andorran Football Federation (2009). When he was a president of UE Sant Julià that club won in 2009-10 UEFA Champions League qualifying with Sammarinese SP Tre Fiori, which was the first win of Andorran club in Champions League. As Andorran Football Federation president he has been replaced by Victor Santos in October 2013.

== Private life ==
He is married with one child.

== Bibliography ==
- "Antoni Giribet Fiter". UEFA. 2 January 2011. Archived from the original on 8 September 2013.
