= Doug Davis (pitcher) =

American baseball player (born 1975)

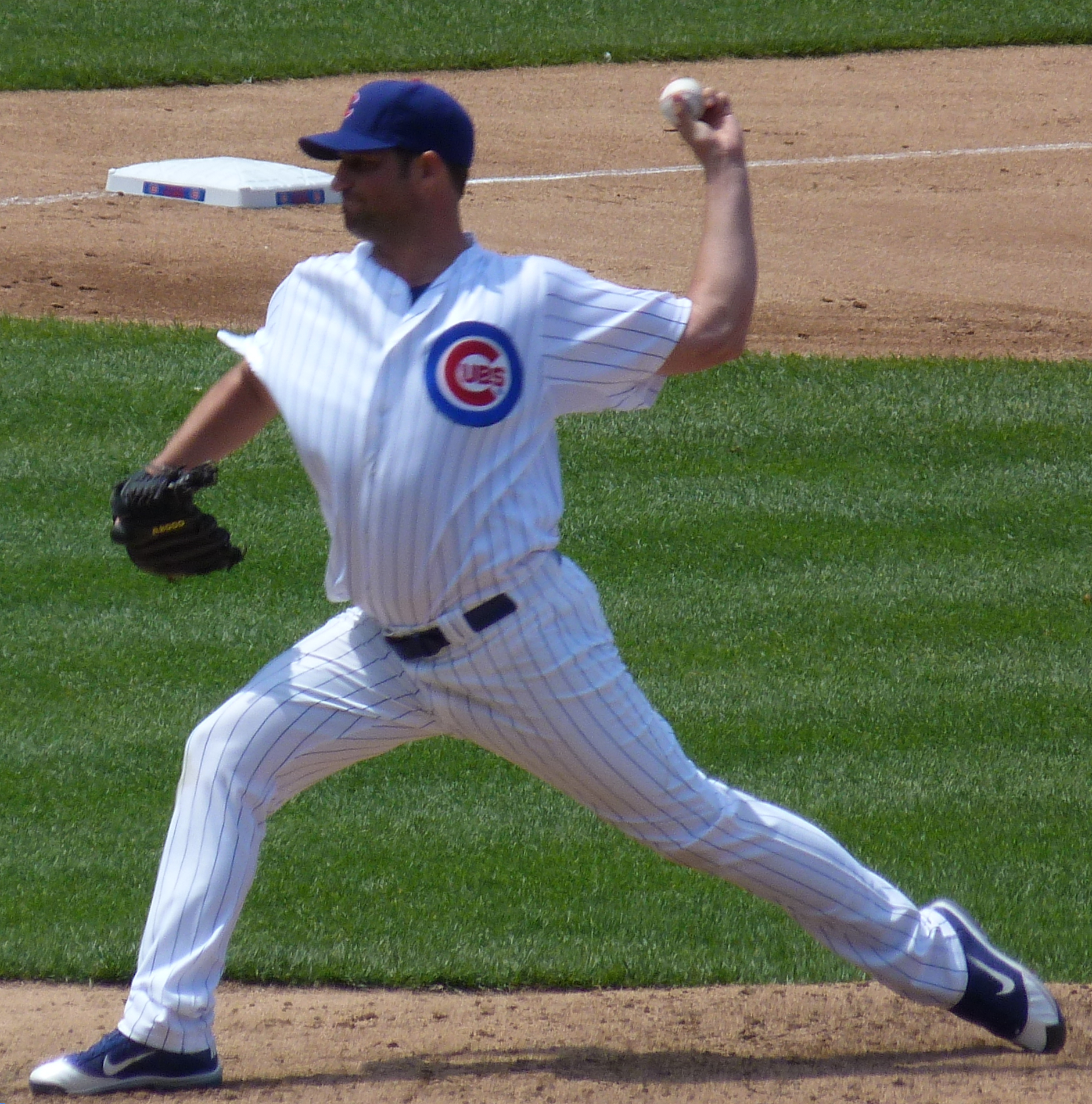
- Davis with the Chicago Cubs
- Pitcher
- Born: September 21, 1975 (age 50); Sacramento, California, U.S.
- Batted: Right Threw: Left

MLB debut
- August 9, 1999, for the Texas Rangers

Last MLB appearance
- June 28, 2011, for the Chicago Cubs

MLB statistics
- Win–loss record: 92–108
- Earned run average: 4.44
- Strikeouts: 1,279
- Stats at Baseball Reference

Teams
- Texas Rangers (1999–2003); Toronto Blue Jays (2003); Milwaukee Brewers (2003–2006); Arizona Diamondbacks (2007–2009); Milwaukee Brewers (2010); Chicago Cubs (2011)

Douglas N. Davis (born September 21, 1975) is an American former professional baseball pitcher. He played in Major League Baseball (MLB) for the Texas Rangers, Toronto Blue Jays, Milwaukee Brewers, Arizona Diamondbacks, and Chicago Cubs.

== Youth ==
Davis was born in Sacramento, California, and went to Northgate High School in Walnut Creek, California, where he played football and baseball. He was drafted by the Los Angeles Dodgers following his senior year in high school, but did not sign.

== College ==
Davis attended Diablo Valley College after high school and played baseball. He later attended the City College of San Francisco, where he earned Second Team All-Conference honors as a pitcher in his junior season.

== Minor league career ==
Davis was drafted by the Texas Rangers in the 10th round of the 1996 Major League Baseball draft.

Davis began his minor league career for the Texas Rangers rookie league affiliate, the Gulf Coast Rangers, in 1996 where he went 3–1 with a 1.90 ERA in 8 games and 42 innings. In 1997 Davis started his season with the Gulf Coast Rangers going 3–1 with a 1.70 ERA in 4 games before being promoted to the High-A Charlotte Rangers where he spent the rest of 1998 and 1998, going 16–10 over that period.

In 1999, Davis began the season in AA Tulsa posting an impressive 2.42 ERA over 74 1/3 innings with a record of 4–4, which earned him a promotion to the AAA Oklahoma RedHawks where he finished the season with a 7–0 record, 3.00 ERA. Davis made his major league debut in 1999, and then spent time between AAA and the Major Leagues from 1999 to 2003 before becoming a full-time major league player, going 17–6 during that period.

== Major league career ==
=== Texas Rangers ===
Davis made his MLB debut on August 9, 1999, for the Rangers, appearing in only 2 games. Davis pitched out of the bullpen for the majority of the season while also making 13 starts. He also threw a complete game against the Red Sox on August 21. Davis was inserted into the Rangers rotation, making 30 starts. He finished 11–10 in 186 innings.

Davis' 2002 season was cut short due to injury, managing to make just 10 starts for the Rangers. In 2003, Davis only made 1 start, pitching 3 innings while allowing 4 runs.

=== Toronto Blue Jays ===
Davis was claimed off waivers on April 30 by the Blue Jays. He started 11 games for them, going 4–6 with a 5.00 ERA.

=== Milwaukee Brewers ===
Davis signed with the Milwaukee Brewers after becoming a free agent in mid-July. He made 5 starts in Triple-A before being called up on August 11, 2003. On September 19, he allowed a home run to Hall of Fame pitcher Randy Johnson, the only home run of Johnson's career.

Davis was an anchor for the Brewers in 2004. He had career bests in all pitching categories, notching 12 wins while allowing a career low 14 home runs.

Davis continued with the Brewers in 2005, going 11–11 with a 3.84 ERA.

On Mother's Day, May 14, 2006, Davis was one of more than 50 batters who brandished a pink bat to benefit the Breast Cancer Foundation. Davis made a brief appearance in 2005 as a potential home buyer on the A&E television program Flip This House episode "It's a Rat Race".

He finished the 2006 season 11–11 with a 4.91 ERA and 102 walks.

=== Arizona Diamondbacks ===
On November 25, 2006, Davis was traded to the Arizona Diamondbacks along with pitcher Dana Eveland and outfielder Dave Krynzel, for catcher Johnny Estrada, and pitchers Greg Aquino and Claudio Vargas. The Diamondbacks and Doug Davis agreed to a three-year, $22 million deal.

In his first season for the Diamondbacks, Davis went 13–12 with a 4.25 ERA and 144 strikeouts in 192 2/3 innings.

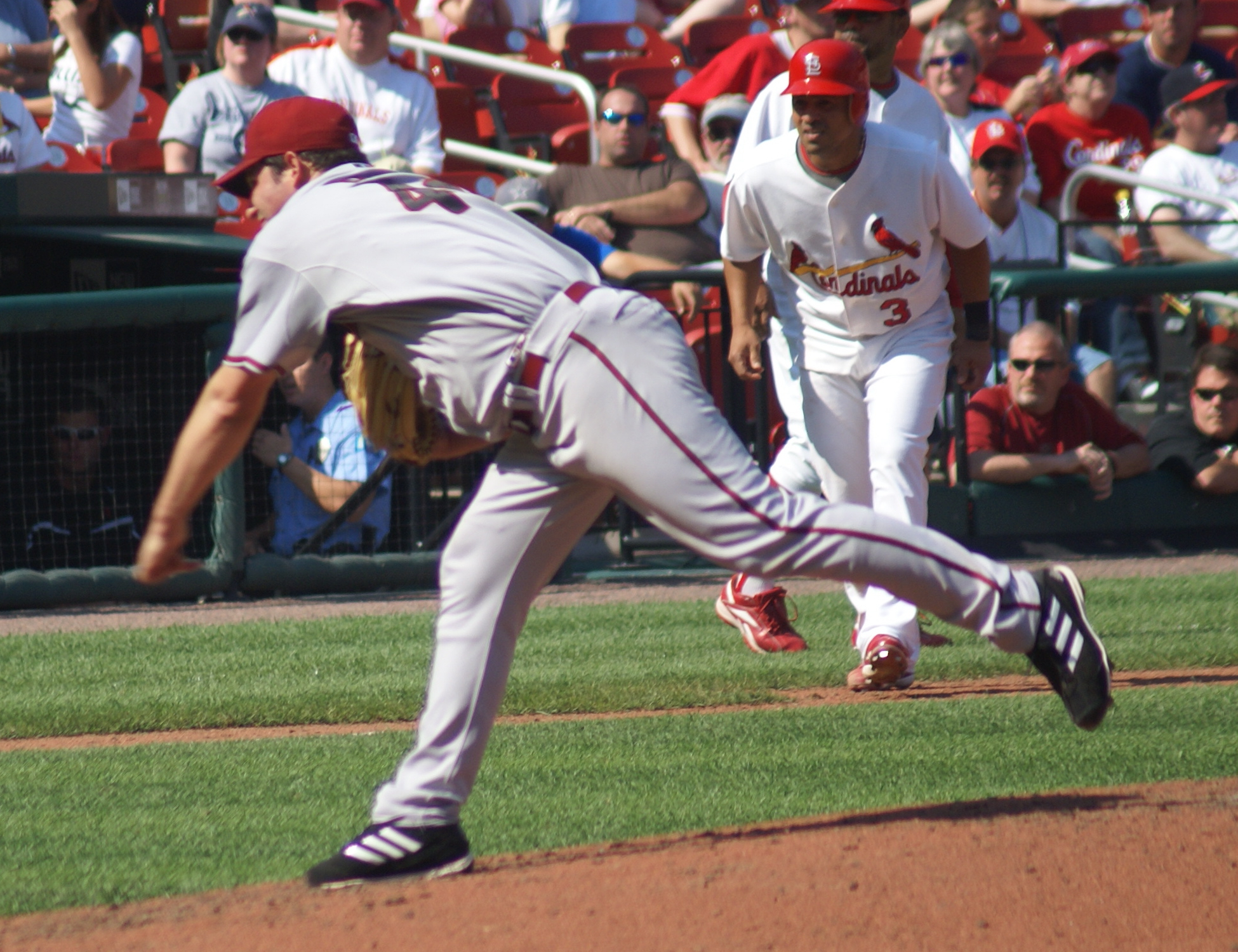
Davis pitching for the Arizona Diamondbacks in 2008.

On July 29, 2008, Davis took a perfect game into the bottom of the 7th inning at Petco Park. Davis' 2008 season was cut short due to injury, making 26 starts, and finishing with a record of 6–8.

On August 12, 2009, Davis' former team, the Milwaukee Brewers, put a waiver claim on him, but he was not traded. Davis ended the season with a 9–14 record, with a 4.12 ERA and 1.51 WHIP. He tied for the major league lead in errors by a pitcher with 5, and also led the league in walks with 103.

=== Milwaukee Brewers (second stint) ===
On January 22, 2010, Davis signed a one-year contract with the Milwaukee Brewers for $4.25 million in 2010, with a $6.5 million mutual option for 2011 with a $1 million buyout. Davis endured a rough season in 2010, making only 8 starts and going 1–4 with a 7.51 ERA. He spent most of the season on the disabled list. His option was declined after the season.

=== Chicago Cubs ===
On April 12, 2011, Davis signed a minor league contract with the Chicago Cubs, stipulating that if he were to join the Cubs major league team that season, he would make $900,000 with possible bonuses that could bring his total salary to nearly $2 million. The Cubs purchased his contract on May 14.

Davis was released on June 29 by the Cubs after going 1–7 with a 6.50 ERA in 9 starts.

=== Chicago White Sox ===
On July 18, 2011, Davis signed a minor league contract with the Chicago White Sox. He was released on September 4.

=== Kansas City Royals ===
On May 12, 2012, Davis signed a minor league contract with the Kansas City Royals. He remained the whole season at Triple-A, going 9–4 with a 4.66 ERA in 16 starts for the Omaha Storm Chasers. He became a free agent following the season on November 2.

== Pitching style ==
Davis threw four pitches: a four-seam fastball at 84–87 mph, a cutter at 80–84, a curveball at 68–72, and a changeup at 78–81. Davis's four-seamer was the slowest fastball among left-handed starters in the 2011 season.

Davis typically had a high walk rate throughout his career. He has finished in the top 2 in the National League in walks four times, including first in 2009.

He was known for his windup, a slow process that could be compared to the "two-stage" motions many Japanese pitchers have used. He has also been compared to a knuckleball pitcher inasmuch as Davis never knew where his pitches were going to go; Alex Rodriguez described it as, "“He throws the ball all over the place, throws a very slow breaking ball, good changeup, good fastball, good cutter,”

== Personal life ==
Davis is married to Chantelle Renee Davis, with whom he has three children, Dylan, Gavin and Seaver. He also has a daughter, Drew, and a son, Jordan, with his ex-wife. In his off time, he enjoys golf, chess, fishing, and spending time with his kids.

On March 28, 2008, Davis was diagnosed with thyroid cancer. Davis made two starts in the regular 2008 season before having surgery to remove his thyroid, a procedure scheduled for April 10. Following surgery, Davis was given a radioactive iodine treatment to kill any remaining cancer. He was expected to take 4–6 weeks to recover, and doctors reported a 97% chance of full recovery. On May 9, 2008, it was announced by the Diamondbacks that Davis had undergone a series of tests, the results of which indicated that he was, by then, cancer-free. He was expected to make two rehab starts in the minor leagues before returning to the Diamondbacks' Major League roster.

He returned to the Diamondbacks rotation on May 23, 2008, against the Atlanta Braves. He pitched seven innings, allowing only one run and striking out five in an 11–1 win for Arizona. His father was in the stands for his return.
