= Brandon Claussen =

American baseball player (born 1979)

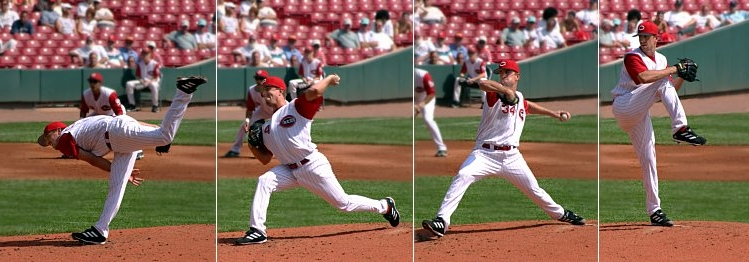
- Claussen in 2004 with the Cincinnati Reds.
- Pitcher
- Born: May 1, 1979 (age 47); Rapid City, South Dakota, U.S.
- Batted: Right Threw: Left

MLB debut
- June 28, 2003, for the New York Yankees

Last MLB appearance
- June 16, 2006, for the Cincinnati Reds

MLB statistics
- Win–loss record: 16–27
- Earned run average: 5.04
- Strikeouts: 228
- Stats at Baseball Reference

Teams
- New York Yankees (2003); Cincinnati Reds (2004–2006)

Brandon Allen Falker Claussen (born May 1, 1979) is an American former Major League Baseball (MLB) starting pitcher.

== Career ==
Claussen graduated from Goddard High School in Roswell, New Mexico. He then attended Howard College in Big Spring, Texas. He was drafted by the New York Yankees in the 34th round of the 1998 Major League Baseball draft while in college. In 2001, he led all minor league pitchers in strikeouts, with 220. In June 2002, Claussen had Tommy John surgery.

Claussen was called up to the major leagues on June 28, 2003. He made his debut against the New York Mets that day. On July 31, 2003, he was traded to the Cincinnati Reds with Charlie Manning and cash for Aaron Boone. Claussen was invited to spring training in 2004, and sent to the minors on March 28. He was recalled on July 20 to make his first start for the Reds. Claussen finished the 2005 season with a 10–11 record and 4.21 ERA. He made his final major league appearance on June 16, 2006, and took the loss against the Chicago White Sox. Two days later, he was diagnosed with rotator cuff tendinitis and placed on the disabled list. On August 14, Claussen underwent an operation to repair the rotator cuff and debridement in his throwing shoulder. On January 12, 2007, he signed a minor league deal with the Washington Nationals. He became a free agent at the end of the season.
