= Dan Kolb =

American baseball player (born 1975)

- Pitcher
- Born: March 29, 1975 (age 51); Sterling, Illinois, U.S.
- Batted: Right Threw: Right

MLB debut
- June 4, 1999, for the Texas Rangers

Last MLB appearance
- June 20, 2007, for the Pittsburgh Pirates

MLB statistics
- Win–loss record: 11–23
- Earned run average: 4.36
- Strikeouts: 177
- Saves: 73
- Stats at Baseball Reference

Teams
- Texas Rangers (1999–2002); Milwaukee Brewers (2003–2004); Atlanta Braves (2005); Milwaukee Brewers (2006); Pittsburgh Pirates (2007)

Career highlights and awards
- All-Star (2004)

Daniel Lee Kolb (born March 29, 1975) is an American former professional baseball relief pitcher. He played in Major League Baseball (MLB) for the Texas Rangers, Atlanta Braves, Milwaukee Brewers, and Pittsburgh Pirates. He batted and threw right-handed.

== Career ==
Kolb graduated from Walnut High School in Walnut, Illinois.

=== Texas Rangers ===
Kolb was drafted by the Texas Rangers in the sixth round, with the 150th overall selection, of the 1995 Major League Baseball draft. He made his major league debut with Texas in 1999. He spent that season and the next three seasons being shuttled between the Rangers and their minor league affiliates, making appearances for the Double-A Tulsa Drillers and Triple-A Oklahoma RedHawks. On March 26, 2003, Kolb was released by the Rangers and became a free agent.

=== Milwaukee Brewers ===
On April 2, 2003, Kolb signed with the Milwaukee Brewers, where he became the team's primary closer. He made 37 appearances out of the bullpen for Milwaukee that year, compiling a 1-2 record and 1.96 ERA with 39 strikeouts and 21 saves across 41 1/3 innings pitched.

Kolb converted 60 of 67 save opportunities in 2003 and 2004, and made the 2004 NL All-Star team in a year that saw him record a 2.98 ERA with 21 strikeouts and 39 saves over 64 appearances.

=== Atlanta Braves ===
Before the 2005 season, the Atlanta Braves returned closer John Smoltz to his original starter role to compensate for several losses in their pitching rotation. On December 11, 2004, the Braves traded pitchers José Capellán and Alec Zumwalt to the Brewers in exchange for Kolb to replace Smoltz in the bullpen. However, Kolb endured a poor season with the Braves, going 3-8 with a 5.93 ERA while recording only 11 saves before being replaced in the closer role by Chris Reitsma. He admitted following the season that the pressure of replacing a legend like Smoltz played a big part in his ineffectiveness.

=== Milwaukee Brewers (second stint) ===
On December 7, 2005, at the Winter Meetings, Kolb was traded back to the Milwaukee Brewers in exchange for reliever Wes Obermueller. He signed a one-year, $2 million deal with the Brewers on January 4, 2006 to serve as a setup man to Derrick Turnbow. He finished the year with a 2-2 record and a 4.84 ERA in 53 games.

He declared free agency on November 1, 2006.

=== Pittsburgh Pirates ===
Kolb signed a minor league contract with the Pittsburgh Pirates on February 3, 2007. On March 29, he was told he would not be added to the major league roster to start the season. On June 12, the Pirates recalled Kolb from the Triple-A Indianapolis Indians. In three appearances for Pittsburgh, he struggled to a 9.00 ERA with two strikeouts over three innings of work. Kolb was designated for assignment and was released from the Pirates on October 8 after he declined the option to go to the minor leagues.

=== Boston Red Sox ===
On January 22, 2008, Kolb signed a minor league contract that included an invitation to spring training with the Boston Red Sox. In nine appearances for the Triple-A Pawtucket Red Sox, he logged a 2.92 ERA with five strikeouts across 12 1/3 innings pitched. Kolb was released by the Red Sox organization on April 26.
