= Wes Obermueller =

American baseball player (born 1976)

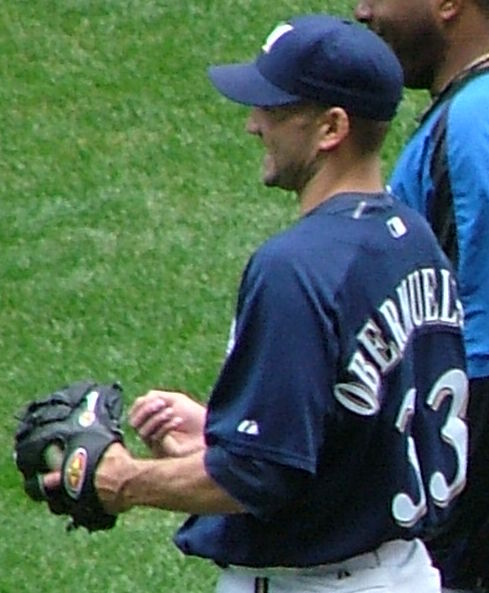
- Obermueller with the Milwaukee Brewers in 2004

Iowa Hawkeyes
- Pitcher
- Born: December 22, 1976 (age 49); Cedar Rapids, Iowa, U.S.
- Batted: Right Threw: Right

Professional debut
- MLB: September 20, 2002, for the Kansas City Royals
- NPB: May 7, 2006, for the Orix Buffaloes
- KBO: April 1, 2008, for the Samsung Lions

Last appearance
- NPB: August 16, 2006, for the Orix Buffaloes
- MLB: July 13, 2007, for the Florida Marlins
- KBO: July 9, 2008, for the Samsung Lions

MLB statistics
- Win–loss record: 11–22
- Earned run average: 5.82
- Strikeouts: 166

NPB statistics
- Win–loss record: 1–6
- Earned run average: 5.31
- Strikeouts: 27

KBO statistics
- Win–loss record: 6–8
- Earned run average: 5.82
- Strikeouts: 49
- Stats at Baseball Reference

Teams
- Kansas City Royals (2002); Milwaukee Brewers (2003–2005); Orix Buffaloes (2006); Florida Marlins (2007); Samsung Lions (2008)

Wesley Mitchell Obermueller (born December 22, 1976) is an American former professional baseball pitcher. He played in Major League Baseball (MLB) for the Kansas City Royals, Milwaukee Brewers, and Florida Marlins, in Nippon Professional Baseball (NPB) for the Orix Buffaloes, and in the KBO League for the Samsung Lions.

== Career ==
Obermueller studied at the University of Iowa. He began his professional career in the Kansas City Royals organization when he was selected in the 2nd round of the 1999 Major League Baseball draft.

The Royals traded Obermueller and Alejandro Machado to the Milwaukee Brewers for Curtis Leskanic and cash considerations on July 2, 2003. Obermueller played in the Milwaukee Brewers system for three years, prior to being traded to the Atlanta Braves in the winter of 2005 for Dan Kolb. He was released by the Braves on April 17, and then played for the Orix Buffaloes in Japan. Before the 2007 season, he signed with the Florida Marlins. Before the 2008 season, he signed with the Samsung Lions in the KBO League and was released in July.

In January 2026, Obermueller was named pitching coach at Iowa, his alma mater.

== Personal life ==
Obermueller's son, Cade, is also attending the University of Iowa and is a sophomore pitcher for the Hawkeyes as of 2024. Cade was in the 2024 and 2025 MLB draft and was drafted in the 19th round by the Texas Rangers in 2024 and drafted by the Philadelphia Phillies in the 2nd round in 2025.
