= Derrick Turnbow =

American baseball player (born 1978)

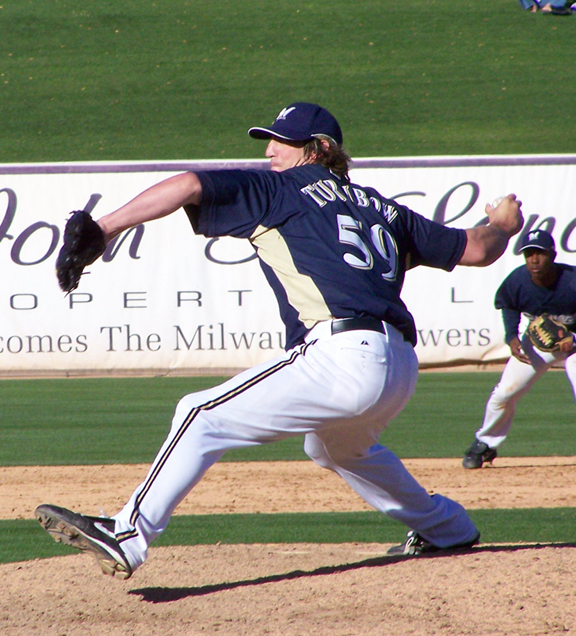
- Turnbow with the Milwaukee Brewers
- Pitcher
- Born: January 25, 1978 (age 48); Union City, Tennessee, U.S.
- Batted: Right Threw: Right

MLB debut
- April 17, 2000, for the Anaheim Angels

Last MLB appearance
- April 20, 2008, for the Milwaukee Brewers

MLB statistics
- Win–loss record: 17–16
- Earned run average: 4.30
- Strikeouts: 265
- Saves: 65
- Stats at Baseball Reference

Teams
- Anaheim Angels (2000, 2003–2004); Milwaukee Brewers (2005–2008)

Career highlights and awards
- All-Star (2006)

Thomas Derrick Turnbow (born January 25, 1978) is an American former professional baseball right-handed relief pitcher, who played in Major League Baseball (MLB) for the Anaheim Angels and Milwaukee Brewers.

== Early career ==
Turnbow was born in Union City, Tennessee, and played baseball at Franklin High School, where he compiled a 30-4 record over four years. In his senior year, he posted a Franklin High single-season best 0.77 ERA. The school retired Turnbow's number (20) in 2001, and he is currently the only baseball player to have been awarded that honor. He was drafted in 1997 by the Philadelphia Phillies in the 5th round of the Major League Baseball draft. He was then acquired by the Anaheim Angels in the 1999 Rule 5 draft. In October 2003, Turnbow became the first major league player to test positive for a banned steroid. The positive test came during tryouts for USA Baseball's Olympic qualifying team. He did not face sanctions from Major League Baseball, because they did not begin testing for or penalizing steroid use until the 2004 season. He was banned for two years from international competition. He got out to a promising start in his career, even representing the Brewers at the 2006 MLB All-Star Game.

== 2004–2005 ==
Claimed off waivers by the Milwaukee Brewers following the 2004 season, Turnbow worked with Brewers pitching coach Mike Maddux before the 2005 season to help control his fastball, which routinely clocked in at 97-98 mph. Turnbow became the Brewers' closer in April 2005 and finished the 2005 season with 39 saves, matching the team record set previously by Dan Kolb in 2004, and setting personal bests with a 1.74 ERA and 7-1 record in 67.1 innings pitched. Turnbow was rewarded with a three-year $6.5 million contract, which ran through 2008 and "bought out" his first two seasons of arbitration eligibility.

Turnbow picked up his first career save on April 24, 2005, at San Francisco. He finished the 2005 season with an ERA of 1.74, the second lowest among National League relievers. He finished second, by just 3 points, behind Washington's Chad Cordero for the 2005 Rolaids Relief Man of the Year Award.

== 2006 season ==
Before the 2006 season, Turnbow signed a three-year contract extension worth a guaranteed $6.5 million. In April 2006, Turnbow made major league history since saves became an official statistic in 1969 by earning a save in each of the first four games of the season. In 2006, he was selected to his first All-Star team. Turnbow struggled with his command through the 2006 season, however, converting only 1 of 5 save opportunities and posting a 21.32 ERA in July 2006, and causing manager Ned Yost to remove Turnbow from the closer role in favor of Francisco Cordero.

== 2007 & 2008 seasons ==
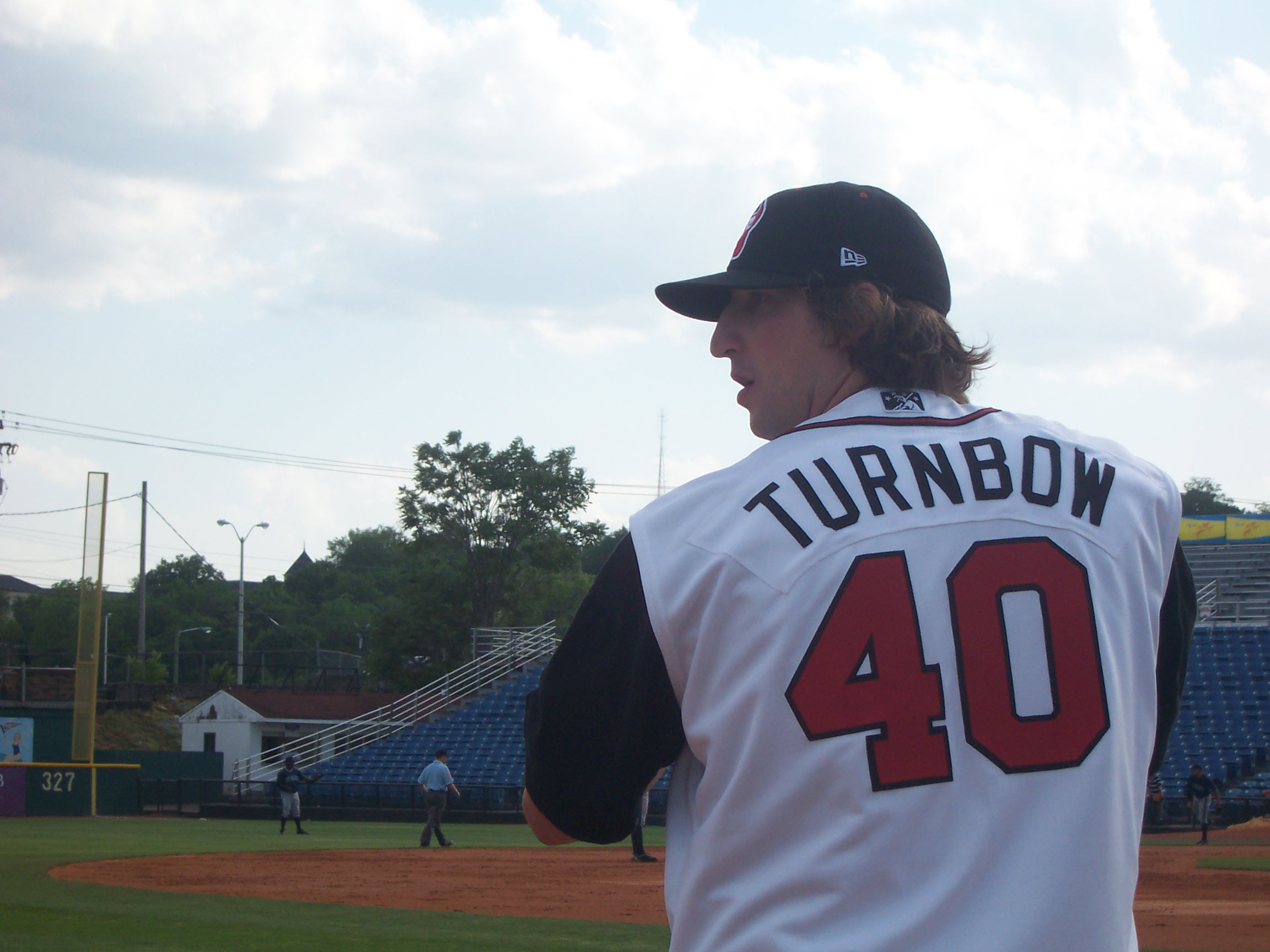
Turnbow with the Nashville Sounds in May 2008

Turnbow struggled throughout much of 2007. In eight relief appearances with Milwaukee in 2008, he accumulated an 0-1 record with one save and a 15.63 ERA (11 earned runs in 6 1/3 innings). On May 1, 2008, Turnbow was designated for assignment by the Brewers. He was given the choice of reporting to the minors, being claimed off waivers by another team, or becoming a free agent and thus forfeiting his $3.2 million salary. On May 9, Turnbow was outrighted to the Triple-A Nashville Sounds. He joined the team on May 12. During his short tenure with the Sounds, Turnbow suffered a complete loss of command; in the 18 innings he pitched, he walked 41 batters and threw 10 wild pitches. Turnbow finished the 2008 season without being on any minor league roster due to a slight labrum tear. He was granted free agency during the Brewers' brief playoff run.

== 2009 season ==
Just after the New Year, Turnbow signed with the Texas Rangers. Texas released him on May 1, 2009.

== 2010 season ==
On January 29, 2010, Turnbow agreed to a minor league contract with the Florida Marlins with an invite to spring training. After only two appearances in the Grapefruit League, Turnbow injured his shoulder while throwing thus putting his comeback on hold.

On March 17, 2010, Turnbow was released by the Florida Marlins and shortly thereafter announced his retirement from baseball.
