= Víctor Santos (baseball) =

Dominican baseball player (born 1976)

- Pitcher
- Born: 2 October 1976 (age 49); San Pedro de Macorís, Dominican Republic
- Batted: Right Threw: Right

MLB debut
- April 9, 2001, for the Detroit Tigers

Last MLB appearance
- September 29, 2007, for the Baltimore Orioles

MLB statistics
- Win–loss record: 23–48
- Earned run average: 5.21
- Strikeouts: 425
- Stats at Baseball Reference

Teams
- Detroit Tigers (2001); Colorado Rockies (2002); Texas Rangers (2003); Milwaukee Brewers (2004–2005); Pittsburgh Pirates (2006); Cincinnati Reds (2007); Baltimore Orioles (2007)

Víctor Irving Santos (born 2 October 1976) is a Dominican former professional baseball player. He played in Major League Baseball as a relief pitcher from 2001 to 2007.

== Early life ==
Santos was born in San Pedro de Macorís, Dominican Republic. His biography lists that he graduated from Passaic High School in Passaic, New Jersey in 1995, though Santos was a four-year starter on the baseball team at Saint Peter's College in Jersey City, New Jersey. In 1994, he was named Most Valuable Player of the Metro Atlantic Athletic Conference baseball tournament, where he was the winning pitcher twice in the Peacocks' three-game sweep. Santos is the first former Peacock baseball player to reach the majors.

== Professional career ==
Santos signed with the Detroit Tigers as a non-drafted free agent in 1995. In 2001, Santos was named Tigers Rookie of the Year. Although he allowed some unearned runs, Santos posted a 0.00 ERA over his first 27.1 innings in the majors, the longest such streak to start a career since Fernando Valenzuela of the Los Angeles Dodgers in 1980–81 (34 innings). For his effort, he was named Detroit rookie of the year by the Detroit Sports Broadcasters Association.

Santos was traded to the Colorado Rockies for José Paniagua in 2002 and acquired by the Texas Rangers before the 2003 season. Then he signed a minor league contract with the Milwaukee Brewers before being called up for the 2004 season, where he earned his way onto the starting rotation. After two years with Milwaukee, he made an unusual route via the Kansas City Royals and the Rule 5 draft onto the major-league roster of the Pittsburgh Pirates for the 2006 season.

The Pirates granted him free agency on October 6, 2006, immediately after the 2006 season ended. On January 8, 2007, he signed a minor league deal with the Reds. On September 7, 2007, he was traded to the Baltimore Orioles for cash considerations.

Santos elected free agency on October 12, 2007. On January 11, 2008, Santos signed with the San Francisco Giants to a minor league contract with an invitation to spring training. He became a free agent at the end of the season. After splitting the 2009 season between the independent Newark Bears and the Vaqueros Laguna, he played with the Vaqueros again in 2010, appearing in 10 games with a 3–4 record.

== Personal life ==
Santos has been a resident of Woodland Park, New Jersey.
