= 2004 Los Angeles Dodgers season =

2004 Los Angeles Dodgers
- National League West champions
- League: National League
- Division: West
- Ballpark: Dodger Stadium
- City: Los Angeles
- Record: 93–69 (.574)
- Divisional place: 1st
- Owners: Frank McCourt
- President: Jamie McCourt
- General managers: Paul DePodesta
- Managers: Jim Tracy
- Television: Fox Sports Net West 2; KCOP (13)
- Radio: KFWB; Vin Scully, Ross Porter, Rick Monday; KWKW; Jaime Jarrín, Pepe Yñiguez, Fernando Valenzuela

The 2004 Los Angeles Dodgers season was the 115th for the franchise in Major League Baseball, and their 47th season in Los Angeles, California. It brought change to the Dodgers as Fox Entertainment Group sold the franchise to developer Frank McCourt was finalized during spring training. McCourt promptly dismissed General Manager Dan Evans and hired Paul DePodesta to take over the team. That led to a flurry of trade activity as the new group attempted to rebuild the Dodgers in their image.

Despite it all, the Dodgers managed to finish the season in first place in the National League West and won their first postseason game since 1988. However they lost the NLDS 3–1 to the St. Louis Cardinals.

== Offseason ==
- December 13, 2003: Acquired Jeff Weaver, Yhency Brazobán and Brandon Weeden from the New York Yankees for Kevin Brown and cash.
- March 29, 2004: Acquired Jason Grabowski from the Oakland Athletics for cash.
- March 30, 2004: Acquired Jayson Werth from the Toronto Blue Jays for Jason Frasor.
- April 1, 2004: Acquired Cody Ross from the Detroit Tigers for Steve Colyer and cash.
- April 3, 2004: Acquired Aaron Looper and Ryan Ketchner from the Seattle Mariners for Jolbert Cabrera.
- April 3, 2004: Acquired Antonio Perez from the Tampa Bay Devil Rays for Jason Romano.
- April 4, 2004: Acquired Milton Bradley from the Cleveland Indians for Franklin Gutierrez and Andrew Brown.

== Regular season ==
=== Season standings ===
==== National League West ====
NL West
Team	W	L	Pct.	GB	Home	Road
Los Angeles Dodgers	93	69	.574	—	49‍–‍32	44‍–‍37
San Francisco Giants	91	71	.562	2	47‍–‍35	44‍–‍36
San Diego Padres	87	75	.537	6	42‍–‍39	45‍–‍36
Colorado Rockies	68	94	.420	25	38‍–‍43	30‍–‍51
Arizona Diamondbacks	51	111	.315	42	29‍–‍52	22‍–‍59

==== Record vs. opponents ====
2004 National League record Source: MLB Standings Grid – 2004
Team	AZ	ATL	CHC	CIN	COL	FLA	HOU	LAD	MIL	MON	NYM	PHI	PIT	SD	SF	STL	AL
Arizona	—	2–4	4–2	3–3	6–13	3–4	2–4	3–16	3–3	0–6	3–4	1–5	2–4	7–12	5–14	1–5	6–12
Atlanta	4–2	—	3–3	2–4	4–2	14–5	3–3	4–3	4–2	15–4	12–7	10–9	4–2	3–3	4–3	2–4	8–10
Chicago	2–4	3–3	—	9–8	5–1	3–3	10–9	2–4	10–7	3–3	4–2	3–3	13–5	4–2	2–4	8–11	8–4
Cincinnati	3–3	4–2	8–9	—	3–3	4–2	6–11	4–2	10–8	4–2	3–3	3–3	9–10	2–4	3–3	5–14	5-7
Colorado	13–6	2–4	1–5	3–3	—	1–5	1–5	8–11	2–4	2–4	1–5	5–3	2–4	10–9	8–11	1–5	8–10
Florida	4–3	5–14	3–3	2–4	5–1	—	3–3	3–3	4–2	11–8	15–4	12–7	1–5	4–2	2–5	2–4	7–11
Houston	4–2	3–3	9–10	11–6	5–1	3-3	—	1–5	13–6	2–4	2–4	6–0	12–5	2–4	2–4	10–8	7–5
Los Angeles	16–3	3–4	4–2	2–4	11–8	3–3	5–1	—	3–3	4–3	3–3	1–5	6–0	10–9	10–9	2–4	10–8
Milwaukee	3–3	2–4	7–10	8–10	4–2	2–4	6–13	3–3	—	5–1	2–4	0–6	6–12	2–4	1–5	8–9	8–4
Montreal	6–0	4–15	3–3	2–4	4–2	8-11	4–2	3–4	1–5	—	9–10	7–12	4–2	1–6	1–5	3–3	7–11
New York	4–3	7–12	2–4	3–3	5–1	4–15	4–2	3–3	4–2	10–9	—	8–11	1–5	1–6	4–2	1–5	10–8
Philadelphia	5-1	9–10	3–3	3–3	3–5	7–12	0–6	5–1	6–0	12–7	11–8	—	3–3	5–1	2–4	3–3	9–9
Pittsburgh	4–2	2–4	5–13	10–9	4–2	5–1	5–12	0–6	12–6	2–4	5–1	3–3	—	3–3	5–1	5–12	2–10
San Diego	12–7	3–3	2–4	4–2	9–10	2–4	4–2	9–10	4–2	6–1	6–1	1–5	3–3	—	12–7	2–4	8–10
San Francisco	14–5	3–4	4–2	3–3	11–8	5–2	4–2	9–10	5–1	5–1	2–4	4–2	1–5	7–12	—	3–3	11–7
St. Louis	5–1	4–2	11–8	14–5	5–1	4-2	8–10	4–2	9–8	3–3	5–1	3–3	12–5	4–2	3–3	—	11–1

=== Opening Day lineup ===
Opening Day starters
Name	Position
Dave Roberts	Left fielder
César Izturis	Shortstop
Milton Bradley	Center fielder
Shawn Green	First baseman
Paul Lo Duca	Catcher
Juan Encarnación	Right fielder
Adrián Beltré	Third baseman
Alex Cora	Second baseman
Hideo Nomo	Starting pitcher

=== Notable transactions ===
- July 30, 2004: Acquired Brad Penny, Hee-Seop Choi and Bill Murphy from the Florida Marlins for Guillermo Mota, Paul Lo Duca and Juan Encarnación.
- July 31, 2004: Acquired Brent Mayne and Steve Finley from the Arizona Diamondbacks for Bill Murphy, Koyie Hill and Reggie Abercrombie.
- July 31, 2004: Acquired Henri Stanley from the Boston Red Sox for Dave Roberts.
- August 19, 2004: Acquired Elmer Dessens and cash from the Arizona Diamondbacks for Jereme Milons.

=== Roster ===
2004 Los Angeles Dodgers
Roster
Pitchers: 47 Wilson Álvarez; 43 Yhency Brazobán; 55 Giovanni Carrara; 46 Elmer Dessens; 37 Darren Dreifort; 58 Brian Falkenborg; 38 Éric Gagné; 17 Kazuhisa Ishii; 22 Edwin Jackson; 60 Masao Kida; 27 José Lima; 51 Tom Martin; 59 Guillermo Mota; 46 Rodney Myers; 10 Hideo Nomo; 30 Brad Penny; 45 Odalis Pérez; 50 Duaner Sánchez; 57 Scott Stewart; 41 Mike Venafro; 36 Jeff Weaver	Catchers: 16 Paul Lo Duca; 6 Brent Mayne; 40 David Ross; 7 Tom Wilson; Infielders: 29 Adrián Beltré; 5 Hee-Seop Choi; 13 Alex Cora; 54 Jose Flores; 15 Shawn Green; 18 José Hernández; 3 César Izturis; 26 Antonio Pérez; 8 Olmedo Sáenz; 49 Joe Thurston; 23 Robin Ventura	Outfielders: 21 Milton Bradley; 52 Chin-Feng Chen; 43 Juan Encarnación; 12 Steve Finley; 33 Jason Grabowski; 30 Dave Roberts; 28 Jayson Werth	Manager: 12,16 Jim Tracy; Coaches: 48 Jim Colborn (pitching); 35 Glenn Hoffman (third base); 14 Jim Lett (bullpen); 11 Manny Mota; 56 Jim Riggleman (bench); 31 John Shelby (1st base); 25 Tim Wallach (hitting)

== Game log ==
=== Regular season ===
Legend
	Dodgers win
	Dodgers loss
	Postponement
	Clinched division
**Bold**	Dodgers team member

2004 regular season game log: 93–69 (Home: 49–32; Away: 44–37)
April: 14–8 (Home: 8–5; Away: 6–3)

#	Date	Time (PT)	Opponent	Score	Win	Loss	Save	Time of Game	Attendance	Record	Box/ Streak
1	April 5		Padres	2–8	Lawrence (1–0)	**Nomo** (0–1)	—		53,850	0–1	
2	April 6		Padres	5–4	**Gagne** (1–0)	Otsuka (0–1)	—		26,437	1–1	
3	April 7		Padres	2–1 (11)	**Lima** (1–0)	Oropesa (0–1)	—		26,932	2–1	
4	April 9		Rockies	5–1	**Ishii** (1–0)	Elarton (0–1)	**Alvarez** (1)		54,399	3–1	
5	April 10		Rockies	7–4	**Nomo** (1–1)	Stark (0–1)	**Gagne** (1)		35,318	4–1	
6	April 11		Rockies	2–4	Estes (2–0)	**Perez** (0–1)	Chacon (1)		27,076	4–2	
7	April 13		@ Padres	3–8	Eaton (1–0)	**Weaver** (0–1)	—		35,156	4–3	
8	April 14		@ Padres	11–4	**Ishii** (2–0)	Wells (0–1)	—		34,558	5–3	
9	April 15		@ Padres	7–5	**Nomo** (2–1)	Lawrence (1–1)	**Gagne** (2)		40,104	6–3	
10	April 16		@ Giants	3–2	**Perez** (1–1)	Schmidt (0–1)	**Gagne** (3)		42,662	7–3	
11	April 17		@ Giants	5–4	**Lima** (2–0)	Rueter (0–1)	**Gagne** (4)		42,663	8–3	
12	April 18		@ Giants	7–6	**Weaver** (1–1)	Tomko (0–1)	**Gagne** (5)		42,377	9–3	
13	April 20		@ Rockies	1–7	Kennedy (2–0)	**Ishii** (2–1)	—		22,169	9–4	
14	April 21		@ Rockies	9–4	**Nomo** (3–1)	Elarton (0–3)	—		21,685	10–4	
15	April 22		@ Rockies	1–7 (6)	Estes (3–1)	**Lima** (2–1)	—		19,667	10–5	
16	April 23		Giants	5–4 (12)	**Dreifort** (1–0)	Herges (0–2)	—		54,598	11–5	
17	April 24		Giants	3–5	Williams (3–1)	**Weaver** (1–2)	Herges (6)		54,820	11–6	
18	April 25		Giants	9–0	**Ishii** (3–1)	Cooper (0–2)	—		54,235	12–6	
19	April 27		Mets	5–9	Glavine (3–1)	**Nomo** (3–2)	—		28,524	12–7	
20	April 28		Mets	3–2	**Perez** (2–1)	Trachsel (2–3)	**Gagne** (6)		29,319	13–7	
21	April 29		Mets	1–6	Seo (1–3)	**Weaver** (1–3)	—		32,067	13–8	
22	April 30		Expos	13–4	**Ishii** (4–1)	Day (2–2)	—		54,958	14–8	

May: 13–14 (Home: 6–6; Away: 7–8)

#	Date	Time (PT)	Opponent	Score	Win	Loss	Save	Time of Game	Attendance	Record	Box/ Streak
23	May 1		Expos	5–4	**Mota** (1–0)	Ayala (0–5)	**Gagne** (7)		52,900	15–8	
24	May 2		Expos	4–6	Kim (1–0)	**Nomo** (3–3)	—		35,351	15–9	
25	May 4		@ Marlins	4–3 (11)	**Sanchez** (1–0)	Wayne (2–1)	**Gagne** (8)		12,520	16–9	
26	May 5		@ Marlins	0–2	Penny (3–1)	**Weaver** (1–4)	Benitez (11)		13,308	16–10	
27	May 6		@ Marlins	9–4	**Ishii** (5–1)	Willis (3–1)	**Gagne** (9)		16,109	17–10	
28	May 7		@ Pirates	4–0	**Alvarez** (1–0)	Ol. Perez (2–1)	—		20,944	18–10	
29	May 8		@ Pirates	4–3	**Mota** (2–0)	Torres (1–1)	**Gagne** (10)		26,610	19–10	
30	May 9		@ Pirates	9–7 (14)	**Falkenborg** (1–0)	Grabow (0–1)	—		16,554	20–10	
31	May 11		Cubs	7–3	**Weaver** (2–4)	Wood (3–3)	—		35,439	21–10	
32	May 12		Cubs	4–0	**Alvarez** (2–0)	Clement (5–2)	—		43,233	22–10	
33	May 13		Cubs	3–7	Zambrano (4–1)	**Nomo** (3–4)	Hawkins (2)		39,591	22–11	
34	May 14		Reds	1–2	Wilson (5–0)	**Ishii** (5–2)	Graves (15)		53,647	22–12	
34	May 15		Reds	0–4	Van Poppel (2–1)	**Od. Perez** (2–2)	Graves (16)		48,787	22–13	
36	May 16		Reds	3–6	Harang (4–1)	**Weaver** (2–5)	Graves (17)		41,479	22–14	
37	May 18		@ Phillies	7–8	Padilla (3–4)	**Mota** (2–1)	Worrell (3)		36,073	22–15	
38	May 19		@ Phillies	4–9	Milton (5–0)	**Nomo** (3–5)	—		33,916	22–16	
39	May 20		@ Phillies	0–4	Myers (3–2)	**Ishii** (5–3)	—		37,793	22–17	
40	May 21		@ Braves	0–2	Ortiz (4–4)	**Od. Perez** (2–3)	Smoltz (7)		27,194	22–18	
41	May 22		@ Braves	7–4	**Weaver** (3–5)	Wright (2–5)	—		31,850	23–18	
42	May 23		@ Braves	1–5	Hampton (1–5)	**Alvarez** (2–1)	—		29,738	23–19	
43	May 25		@ Brewers	5–3	**Lima** (3–1)	Santos (2–1)	**Gagne** (11)		16,129	24–19	
44	May 26		@ Brewers	1–2 (12)	Kinney (2–3)	**Sanchez** (1–1)	—		14,084	24–20	
45	May 27		@ Brewers	1–3	Sheets (5–3)	**Weaver** (3–6)	Kolb (12)		24,616	24–21	
46	May 28		Diamondbacks	L 3–6	Johnson (6–4)	**Alvarez** (2–2)	Dessens (1)		46,455	24–22	L3
47	May 29		Diamondbacks	**W** 10–0	**Lima** (4–1)	Webb (2–5)	—		35,343	25–22	W1
48	May 30		Diamondbacks	**W** 3–0	**Ishii** (6–3)	Fossum (0–3)	**Gagne** (12)		41,060	26–22	W2
49	May 31		Brewers	3–2 (10)	**Gagne** (2–0)	Burba (3–1)	—		32,642	27–22	

June: 12–14 (Home: 8–5; Away: 4–9)

#	Date	Time (PT)	Opponent	Score	Win	Loss	Save	Time of Game	Attendance	Record	Box/ Streak
50	June 1		Brewers	1–4	Davis (4–4)	**Weaver** (3–7)	Kolb (14)		22,402	27–23	
51	June 2		Brewers	5–2	**Jackson** (1–0)	Hendrickson (0–1)	**Gagne** (13)		27,871	28–23	
52	June 4		@ Diamondbacks	**W** 7–3	**Ishii** (7–3)	Fossum (0–4)	**Mota** (1)		32,182	29–23	W2
53	June 5		@ Diamondbacks	**W** 10–3	**Perez** (3–3)	Gonzalez (0–1)	—		42,407	30–23	W3
54	June 6		@ Diamondbacks	L 5–6	Service (1–0)	**Dreifort** (1–1)	Valverde (5)		34,059	30–24	L1
55	June 8		@ Blue Jays	1–7	Lilly (5–2)	**Nomo** (3–6)	—		16,499	30–25	
56	June 9		@ Blue Jays	0–4	Batista (4–4)	**Lima** (4–2)	—		18,003	30–26	
57	June 10		@ Blue Jays	6–1	**Ishii** (8–3)	Towers (1–2)	—		16,267	31–26	
58	June 11		@ Red Sox	1–2	Foulke (2–0)	**Martin** (0–1)	—		35,173	31–27	
59	June 12		@ Red Sox	14–5	**Weaver** (4–7)	Wakefield (4–5)	—		34,671	32–27	
60	June 13		@ Red Sox	1–4	Martínez (7–3)	**Nomo** (3–7)	Foulke (13)		35,068	32–28	
61	June 15		Orioles	5–1	**Lima** (5–2)	Cabrera (3–3)	**Gagne** (14)		29,711	33–28	
62	June 16		Orioles	6–3	**Perez** (4–3)	Riley (1–2)	**Gagne** (15)		35,070	34–28	
63	June 17		Orioles	4–3	**Mota** (3–1)	Lopez (5–3)	**Gagne** (16)		30,465	35–28	
64	June 18		Yankees	6–3	**Weaver** (5–7)	Vazquez (7–5)	**Gagne** (17)		55,207	36–28	
65	June 19		Yankees	2–6	Halsey (1–0)	**Nomo** (3–8)	—		54,876	36–29	
66	June 20		Yankees	5–4	**Lima** (6–2)	Contreras (4–3)	**Gagne** (18)		55,157	37–29	
67	June 21		@ Giants	2–3	Herges (4–2)	**Mota** (3–2)	—		41,453	37–30	
68	June 22		@ Giants	5–11	Brower (5–3)	**Alvarez** (2–3)	—		41,703	37–31	
69	June 23		@ Giants	2–3	Williams (7–5)	**Weaver** (5–8)	Herges (19)		42,340	37–32	
70	June 24		@ Giants	3–9	Tomko (2–4)	**Nomo** (3–9)	—		42,621	37–33	
71	June 25	7:12 p.m. PDT	Angels	L 0–13	Washburn (8–3)	**Lima** (6–3)	—	2:55	54,617	37–34	L5
72	June 26	1:12 p.m. PDT	Angels	L 5–7	Donnelly (1–0)	**Mota** (3–3)	Rodriguez (7)	2:51	52,715	37–35	L6
73	June 27	1:12 p.m. PDT	Angels	**W** 10–5	**Ishii** (9–3)	Colon (5–7)	—	3:06	54,333	38–35	W1
74	June 29		Giants	2–1	**Mota** (4–3)	Brower (5–5)	**Gagne** (19)		51,113	39–35	
75	June 30		Giants	1–7	Tomko (3–4)	**Nomo** (3–10)	—		47,081	39–36	

July: 21–7 (Home: 10–3; Away: 11–4)

#	Date	Time (PT)	Opponent	Score	Win	Loss	Save	Time of Game	Attendance	Record	Box/ Streak
76	July 1		Giants	5–4	**Mota** (5–3)	Rodriguez (2–4)	**Gagne** (20)		54,717	40–36	
77	July 2	7:07 p.m. PDT	@ Angels	L 3–7	Sele (5–0)	**Ishii** (9–4)	—	2:33	43,816	40–37	L1
78	July 3	7:07 p.m. PDT	@ Angels	**W** 8–5	**Mota** (6–3)	Colon (5–8)	**Gagne** (21)	2:43	43,686	41–37	W1
79	July 4	7:11 p.m. PDT	@ Angels	**W** 6–2	**Weaver** (6–8)	Escobar (4–5)	—	2:51	43,823	42–37	W2
80	July 5		Diamondbacks	**W** 6–5 (10)	**Carrara** (1–0)	Villafuerte (0–3)	—		32,929	43–37	W3
81	July 6		Diamondbacks	**W** 4–1	**Lima** (7–3)	Fossum (2–7)	**Gagne** (22)		25,139	44–37	W4
82	July 7		Diamondbacks	**W** 11–0	**Ishii** (10–4)	Sparks (3–5)	—		27,899	45–37	W5
83	July 8		Astros	7–2	**Jackson** (2–0)	Duckworth (1–2)	**Martin** (1)		33,324	46–37	
84	July 9		Astros	2–3	Pettitte (5–2)	**Weaver** (6–9)	Lidge (7)		52,783	46–38	
85	July 10		Astros	3–1	**Alvarez** (3–3)	Clemens (10–3)	**Gagne** (23)		46,321	47–38	
86	July 11		Astros	7–4	**Lima** (8–3)	Oswalt (8–7)	—		40,484	48–38	
—	July 13		**75th All-Star Game in Houston, TX**								
87	July 15		@ Diamondbacks	**W** 4–3	**Alvarez** (4–3)	Choate (1–1)	**Gagne** (24)		28,150	49–38	W2
88	July 16		@ Diamondbacks	**W** 6–2	**Ishii** (11–4)	Webb (3–10)	—		29,255	50–38	W3
89	July 17		@ Diamondbacks	**W** 7–6	**Mota** (7–3)	Bruney (2–3)	**Gagne** (25)		37,027	51–38	W4
90	July 18		@ Diamondbacks	**W** 10–3	**Lima** (9–3)	Dessens (1–6)	—		29,131	52–38	W5
91	July 19		@ Astros	7–6	**Carrara** (2–0)	Miceli (3–5)	**Gagne** (26)		35,155	53–38	
92	July 20		@ Astros	7–5	**Weaver** (7–9)	Weathers (6–5)	**Gagne** (27)		34,154	54–38	
93	July 21		Rockies	5–6	Estes (10–4)	**Ishii** (11–5)	Chacon (21)		34,343	54–39	
94	July 22		Rockies	4–2	**Mota** (8–3)	Harikkala (4–2)	**Gagne** (28)		34,276	55–39	
95	July 23		Padres	3–2	**Gagne** (3–0)	Beck (0–2)	—		55,311	56–39	
96	July 24		Padres	12–2	**Alvarez** (5–3)	Valdez (9–6)	—		52,217	57–39	
97	July 25		Padres	0–3	Eaton (6–8)	**Weaver** (7–10)	Hoffman (26)		46,884	57–40	
98	July 26		@ Rockies	9–7	**Sanchez** (2–1)	Simpson (0–1)	**Gagne** (29)		24,725	58–40	
99	July 27		@ Rockies	2–7	Cook (5–4)	**Perez** (4–4)	—		27,934	58–41	
100	July 28		@ Rockies	4–5	Reed (2–2)	**Mota** (8–4)	Chacon (23)		25,492	58–42	
101	July 29		@ Rockies	3–2	**Alvarez** (6–3)	Dohmann (0–1)	**Gagne** (30)		28,472	59–42	
102	July 30		@ Padres	12–3	**Weaver** (8–10)	Eaton (6–9)	—		42,552	60–42	
103	July 31		@ Padres	2–3	Otsuka (6–2)	**Dreifort** (1–2)	Hoffman (29)		43,726	60–43	

August: 17–11 (Home: 7–6; Away: 10–5)

#	Date	Time (PT)	Opponent	Score	Win	Loss	Save	Time of Game	Attendance	Record	Box/ Streak
104	August 1		@ Padres	2–1 (12)	**Gagne** (4–0)	Stone (1–2)	**Dreifort** (1)		44,056	61–43	
105	August 3		Pirates	3–2	**Penny** (9–8)	Ol. Perez (6–6)	**Gagne** (31)		34,581	62–43	
106	August 4		Pirates	2–1	**Lima** (10–3)	Fogg (6–8)	**Gagne** (32)		34,792	63–43	
107	August 5		Pirates	8–3	**Weaver** (9–10)	Burnett (5–4)	—		38,852	64–43	
108	August 6		Phillies	5–9 (11)	R. Hernandez (2–3)	**Gagne** (4–1)	—		53,977	64–44	
109	August 7		Phillies	6–3	**Od. Perez** (5–4)	Abbott (3–11)	**Gagne** (33)		54,404	65–44	
110	August 8		Phillies	1–4	Myers (7–8)	**Penny** (9–9)	—		53,840	65–45	
111	August 10		@ Reds	5–2	**Lima** (11–3)	Harang (7–4)	**Gagne** (34)		26,295	66–45	
112	August 11		@ Reds	11–1	**Weaver** (10–10)	Claussen (1–3)	—		39,933	67–45	
113	August 12		@ Reds	5–6	White (1–2)	**Dreifort** (1–3)	Graves (36)		27,416	67–46	
114	August 13		@ Cubs	8–1	**Od. Perez** (6–4)	Maddux (11–8)	—		39,105	68–46	
115	August 14		@ Cubs	0–2	Wood (7–5)	**Ishii** (11–6)	Remlinger (1)		39,069	68–47	
116	August 15		@ Cubs	8–5	**Sanchez** (3–1)	Farnsworth (4–4)	**Gagne** (35)		39,079	69–47	
117	August 16		Marlins	2–4	Pavano (13–5)	**Dreifort** (1–4)	Benitez (35)		53,121	69–48	
118	August 17		Marlins	6–1	**Alvarez** (7–3)	Burnett (3–6)	—		45,731	70–48	
119	August 18		Marlins	4–6	Mota (9–5)	**Gagne** (4–2)	Benitez (36)		46,241	70–49	
120	August 19		Braves	5–6	Reitsma (6–3)	**Gagne** (4–3)	Smoltz (32)		42,287	70–50	
121	August 20		Braves	3–2 (11)	**Carrara** (3–0)	Cruz (4–1)	—		54,993	71–50	
122	August 21		Braves	7–4	**Weaver** (11–10)	Hampton (9–9)	**Carrara** (1)		52,398	72–50	
123	August 22		Braves	1–10	Wright (12–6)	**Alvarez** (7–4)	—		49,513	72–51	
124	August 23		@ Expos	7–8	Cordero (4–3)	**Carrara** (3–1)	—		8,639	72–52	
125	August 24		@ Expos	10–2	**Ishii** (12–6)	Biddle (4–7)	—		8,109	73–52	
126	August 25		@ Expos	3–6	Horgan (4–1)	**Lima** (11–4)	Ayala (2)		7,570	73–53	
127	August 26		@ Expos	10–3	**Weaver** (12–10)	L. Hernandez (9–12)	—		18,520	74–53	
128	August 27		@ Mets	2–9	Glavine (9–10)	**Alvarez** (7–5)	—		42,694	74–54	
129	August 28		@ Mets	4–2	**Carrara** (4–1)	Stanton (2–6)	**Gagne** (36)		40,660	75–54	
130	August 29		@ Mets	10–2	**Ishii** (13–6)	Benson (10–11)	—		33,582	76–54	
131	August 31		@ Diamondbacks	**W** 4–1 (13)	**Gagne** (5–3)	Bruney (3–4)	**Carrara** (2)		39,167	77–54	W3

September: 15–13 (Home: 9–5; Away: 6–8)

#	Date	Time (PT)	Opponent	Score	Win	Loss	Save	Time of Game	Attendance	Record	Box/ Streak
132	September 1		@ Diamondbacks	L 1–3	Webb (6–14)	**Nomo** (3–11)	Aquino (10)		34,149	77–55	L1
133	September 2		@ Diamondbacks	**W** 8–4	**Brazoban** (1–0)	Nance (1–1)	**Gagne** (37)		33,224	78–55	W1
134	September 3		@ Cardinals	0–3	Morris (15–8)	**Lima** (11–5)	—		37,524	78–56	
135	September 4		@ Cardinals	1–5	Marquis (14–4)	**Ishii** (13–7)	—		45,692	78–57	
136	September 5		@ Cardinals	5–6 (11)	King (5–2)	**Carrara** (4–2)	—		43,611	78–58	
137	September 7		Diamondbacks	**W** 8–2	**Nomo** (4–11)	Webb (6–15)	—		35,078	79–58	W1
138	September 8		Diamondbacks	**W** 6–5	**Gagne** (6–3)	Koplove (3–4)	—		28,888	80–58	W2
139	September 9		Diamondbacks	**W** 5–3	**Lima** (12–5)	Gonzalez (0–9)	**Gagne** (38)		27,287	81–58	W3
140	September 10		Cardinals	7–6	**Carrara** (5–2)	Calero (1–1)	**Gagne** (39)		54,119	82–58	
141	September 11		Cardinals	6–5	**Stewart** (1–2)	Eldred (3–2)	**Gagne** (40)		53,494	83–58	
142	September 12		Cardinals	6–7	Carpenter (15–5)	**Jackson** (2–1)	Isringhausen (41)		54,000	83–59	
143	September 13		Padres	7–9	Wells (11–7)	**Perez** (6–5)	Hoffman (36)		36,050	83–60	
144	September 14		Padres	6–3	**Lima** (13–5)	Germano (1–2)	**Gagne** (41)		29,704	84–60	
145	September 15		Padres	3–7	Lawrence (15–12)	**Alvarez** (7–6)	Hoffman (37)		34,105	84–61	
146	September 16		Padres	0–3	Eaton (10–13)	**Weaver** (12–11)	Hoffman (38)		43,185	84–62	
147	September 17		@ Rockies	8–6 (10)	**Gagne** (7–3)	Chacon (1–8)	—		23,572	85–62	
148	September 18		@ Rockies	1–8	Kennedy (9–6)	**Perez** (6–6)	—		21,664	85–63	
149	September 19		@ Rockies	7–6	**Brazoban** (2–0)	Chacon (1–9)	**Gagne** (42)		27,175	86–63	
150	September 21		@ Padres	4–9	Eaton (11–13)	**Weaver** (12–12)	—		39,428	86–64	
151	September 22		@ Padres	0–4	Peavy (13–6)	**Penny** (9–10)	—		41,303	86–65	
152	September 23		@ Padres	9–6	**Brazoban** (3–0)	Lawrence (15–13)	**Gagne** (43)		42,159	87–65	
153	September 24		@ Giants	3–2	**Perez** (7–6)	Rueter (8–12)	**Gagne** (44)		42,528	88–65	
154	September 25		@ Giants	5–9	Eyre (2–2)	**Brazoban** (3–1)	—		42,486	88–66	
155	September 26		@ Giants	7–4	**Weaver** (13–12)	Tomko (11–7)	**Gagne** (45)		42,549	89–66	
156	September 27		Rockies	8–7	**Brazoban** (4–1)	Reed (3–8)	—		36,958	90–66	
157	September 28		Rockies	5–4	**Dessens** (2–6)	Harikkala (6–6)	—		33,588	91–66	
158	September 29		Rockies	1–4	Fuentes (2–3)	**Brazoban** (4–2)	Tsao (1)		43,304	91–67	
159	September 30		Rockies	4–2 (11)	**Brazoban** (5–2)	Fuentes (2–4)	—		53,438	92–67	

October: 1–2 (Home: 1–2; Away: 0–0)

#	Date	Time (PT)	Opponent	Score	Win	Loss	Save	Time of Game	Attendance	Record	Box/ Streak
160	October 1		Giants	2–4	Rueter (9–12)	**Weaver** (13–13)	Hermanson (17)		54,888	92–68	
161	October 2		Giants	7–3	**Brazoban** (6–2)	Hermanson (6–9)	—		54,494	93–68	
162	October 3		Giants	0–10	Schmidt (18–7)	**Ishii** (13–8)	—		54,968	93–69	

=== Postseason Game log ===
Legend
	Dodgers win
	Dodgers loss
**Bold**	Dodgers team member

2004 Postseason game log: 1–3 (Home: 1–1; Away: 0–2)
NL Division Series vs' St. Louis Cardinals 1–3 (Home: 1–1; Away: 0–2)

#	Date	Time (PT)	Opponent	Score	Win	Loss	Save	Time of Game	Attendance	Series	Box/ Streak
1	October 5		@ Cardinals	3–8	Williams (1–0)	**Perez** (0–1)	—		52,127	0–1	
2	October 7		@ Cardinals	3–8	Haren (1–0)	**Weaver** (0–1)	—		52,228	0–2	
3	October 9		Cardinals	4–0	**Lima** (1–0)	Morris (0–1)	—		55,992	1–2	
4	October 10		Cardinals	2–6	Suppan (1–0)	**Alvarez** (0–1)	—		56,268	1–3	

== Starting Pitchers stats ==
Note: G = Games pitched; GS = Games started; IP = Innings pitched; W/L = Wins/Losses; ERA = Earned run average; BB = Walks allowed; SO = Strikeouts; CG = Complete games

Name	G	GS	IP	W/L	ERA	BB	SO	CG
Jeff Weaver	34	34	220.0	13-13	4.01	67	153	0
Odalis Pérez	31	31	196.1	7-6	3.25	44	128	0
Kazuhisa Ishii	31	31	172.0	13-8	4.71	98	99	2
José Lima	36	24	170.1	13-5	4.07	34	93	0
Hideo Nomo	18	18	84.0	4-11	8.25	42	54	0
Edwin Jackson	8	5	24.2	2-1	7.30	11	16	0
Brad Penny	3	3	11.2	1-2	3.09	6	6	0

== Relief Pitchers stats ==
Note: G = Games pitched; GS = Games started; IP = Innings pitched; W/L = Wins/Losses; ERA = Earned run average; BB = Walks allowed; SO = Strikeouts; SV = Saves

Name	G	GS	IP	W/L	ERA	BB	SO	SV
Éric Gagné	70	0	82.1	7-3	2.19	22	114	45
Duaner Sánchez	67	0	80.0	3-1	3.38	27	44	0
Darren Dreifort	60	0	50.2	1-4	4.44	36	63	1
Guillermo Mota	52	0	63.0	8-4	2.14	27	52	1
Tom Martin	47	0	28.1	0-1	4.13	14	18	1
Wilson Álvarez	40	15	120.2	7-6	4.03	31	102	1
Giovanni Carrara	42	0	53.2	5-2	2.18	20	48	2
Yhency Brazobán	31	0	32.2	6-2	2.48	15	27	0
Edwin Jackson	8	5	24.2	2-1	7.30	11	16	0
Elmer Dessens	12	1	19.2	1-0	3.20	8	18	0
Brian Falkenborg	6	0	14.1	1-0	7.53	9	11	0
Scott Stewart	11	0	12.1	1-0	5.84	6	8	0
Mike Venafro	17	0	9.0	0-0	4.00	3	6	0
Masao Kida	3	0	4.2	0-0	0.00	1	5	0
Rodney Myers	1	0	2.0	0-0	0.00	0	1	0

== Batting Stats ==
Note: Pos = Position; G = Games played; AB = At bats; Avg. = Batting average; R = Runs scored; H = Hits; HR = Home runs; RBI = Runs batted in; SB = Stolen bases

Name	Pos	G	AB	Avg.	R	H	HR	RBI	SB
Paul Lo Duca	C/1B	91	349	.301	41	105	10	49	2
David Ross	C	70	165	.170	13	28	5	15	0
Brent Mayne	C	47	96	.188	5	18	0	5	0
Tom Wilson	C	9	8	.125	1	1	0	0	0
Shawn Green	1B/RF	157	590	.266	92	157	28	86	5
Alex Cora	2B	138	405	.264	47	107	10	47	3
César Izturis	SS	159	670	.288	90	193	4	62	25
Adrián Beltré	3B	156	598	.334	104	200	48	121	7
Jose Hernandez	2B/SS/3B/LF	95	211	.289	32	61	13	29	3
Robin Ventura	1B/3B	102	152	.243	19	37	5	28	0
Olmedo Sáenz	1B	77	111	.279	17	31	8	22	0
Hee-Seop Choi	1B	31	62	.161	5	10	0	6	0
Joe Thurston	2B	17	17	.176	1	3	0	1	0
Antonio Perez	2B/SS	13	13	.231	5	3	0	0	1
Jose Flores	3B	9	4	.250	0	1	0	0	0
Jayson Werth	LF/RF/CF	89	290	.262	56	76	16	47	4
Milton Bradley	CF/LF/RF	141	516	.267	72	138	19	67	15
Juan Encarnación	RF/LF	86	324	.235	42	76	13	43	3
Dave Roberts	LF/CF	68	233	.253	45	59	2	21	33
Steve Finley	CF	58	224	.324	31	59	13	46	1
Jason Grabowski	LF/RF	113	173	.220	18	38	7	20	0
Chin-Feng Chen	LF	8	8	.000	1	0	0	0	0

== Postseason ==
The 2004 National League Division Series was played between the Los Angeles Dodgers and St. Louis Cardinals. St. Louis ended up winning the series 3-1.

== 2004 Awards ==
- 2004 Major League Baseball All-Star Game
  - Éric Gagné reserve
  - Paul Lo Duca reserve
- Relief Man of the Year
  - Éric Gagné
- Gold Glove Award
  - Steve Finley
  - César Izturis
- Silver Slugger Award
  - Adrián Beltré
- National League Player of the Month
  - Adrián Beltré (September 2004)
- National League Player of the Week
  - Adrián Beltré (June 21–27, 2004)
  - Steve Finley (Sep. 6–12, 2004)

== Farm system ==
Level	Team	League	Manager
AAA	Las Vegas 51s	Pacific Coast League	Terry Kennedy
AA	Jacksonville Suns	Southern League	Dino Ebel
High A	Vero Beach Dodgers	Florida State League	Scott Little
A	Columbus Catfish	South Atlantic League	Dann Bilardello
Rookie	Ogden Raptors	Pioneer League	Travis Barbary
Rookie	Gulf Coast Dodgers	Gulf Coast League	Luis Salazar
Rookie	DSL Dodgers; DSL Dodgers 2	Dominican Summer League	

== Major League Baseball draft ==
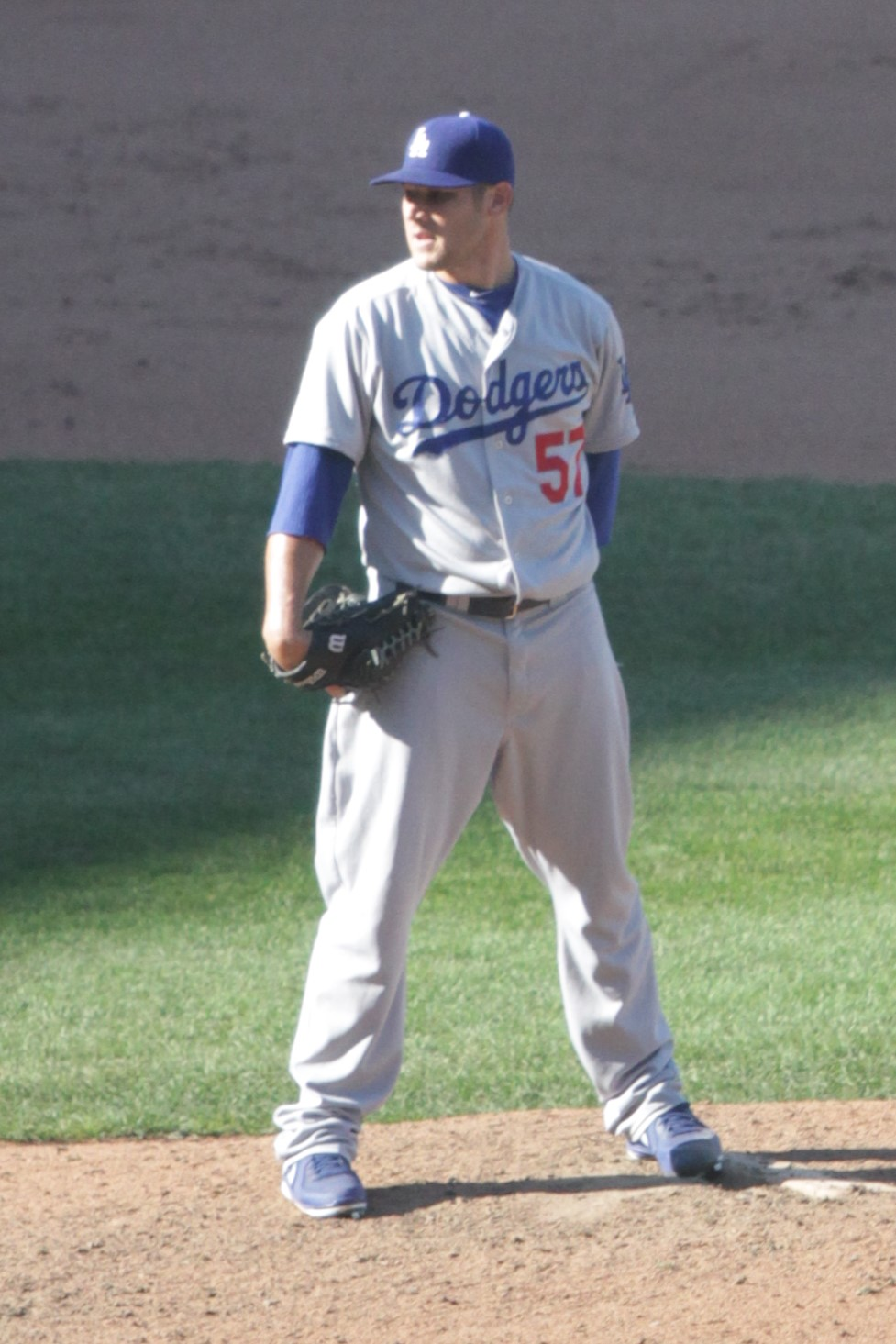
Scott Elbert

The Dodgers selected 52 players in this draft. Of those, nine of them would eventually play Major League baseball. They gained an extra first round pick and a supplemental first round pick as compensation for the loss of free agent pitcher Paul Quantrill.

With their three first round picks, the Dodgers selected left handed pitcher Scott Elbert from Seneca High School, right-handed pitcher Justin Orenduff from Virginia Commonwealth University and second baseman Blake DeWitt from Sikeston High School. Elbert became a relief pitcher for the Dodgers, but numerous injuries kept him from reaching his potential. Orenduff never reached the Majors, pitching in 131 minor league games through 2011. DeWitt hit .257 in 426 games in the Majors, primarily as a utility player.

2004 draft picks

Round	Name	Position	School	Signed	Career span	Highest level
1	Scott Elbert	LHP	Seneca High School	Yes	2004–2015	MLB
1	Blake DeWitt	2B	Sikeston High School	Yes	2004–2013	MLB
1s	Justin Orenduff	RHP	Virginia Commonwealth University	Yes	2004–2011	AAA
2	Blake Johnson	RHP	Parkview Baptist High School	Yes	2004–2013	AAA
3	Cory Dunlap	1B	Contra Costa College	No; Nationals-2006	2004–2007	AAA
4	Javy Guerra	RHP	Billy Ryan High School	Yes	2004–2023	MLB
5	Anthony Raglani	OF	George Washington University	Yes	2004–2007	AA
6	Daniel Batz	1B	University of Rhode Island	Yes	2004–2006	A
7	B. J. Richmond	OF	Spartanburg Methodist College	Yes	2004–2007	A
8	Carlos Medero-Stullz	C	Goleman High School	Yes	2004–2006	A
9	David Nicholson	3B	University of California, Berkeley	Yes	2004–2007	AA
10	Cory Wade	RHP	Kentucky Wesleyan College	Yes	2004–2014	MLB
11	Chris Westervelt	C	Stetson University	Yes	2004–2006	A+
12	Sam Steidl	OF	University of Minnesota Duluth	Yes	2004–2005	A
13	Jeff Larish	OF	Arizona State University	No; Tigers-2005	2005–2013	MLB
14	Brian Akin	RHP	Davidson College	Yes	2004–2009	AAA
15	Joe Savery	LHP	Lamar High School	No; Phillies-2007	2007–2014	MLB
16	Chase Dardar	RHP	Delgado Community College	No; Rockies-2006	2006	A-
17	Daniel Forrer	LHP	Chipola College	No; Pirates-2007	2007	A-
18	Matt Paul	2B	Southern University and A&M College	Yes	2004–2005	A+
19	David Price	LHP	Blackman High School	No; Rays-2008	2008–2022	MLB
20	Mark Alexander	RHP	University of Missouri, Columbia	Yes	2004–2008	AAA
21	Justin Simmons	LHP	University of Texas at Austin	Yes	2004–2006	AAA
22	Kyle Wilson	RHP	University of California, Los Angeles	Yes	2005–2013	AA
23	Kenny Plaisance	RHP	Louisiana State University, Eunice	Yes	2004	A
24	Kody Kaiser	SS	Edmond Santa Fe High School	No; Tigers-2007	2007–2011	AA
25	Justin Ruggiano	OF	Texas A&M University	Yes	2004–2017	MLB
26	Ben Petralli	C	Weatherford High School	No	2010	Ind
27	Levander Graves	C	Dillon High School	No		
28	James Lawler	1B	San Jacinto College	No		
29	Ryan Strieby	1B	Edmonds Community College	No; Tigers-2006	2006–2015	AAA
30	Paul Gran	SS	Bothell High School	No; Marlins-2008	2008–2013	AAA
31	Ryan Koch	RHP	Osceola High School	No; Blue Jays-2008	2008–2009	A
32	Michael Stutes	RHP	Lake Oswego High School	No; Phillies-2008	2008–2013	MLB
33	James Gilbert	RHP	Chabot College	Yes	2006	Rookie
34	Chris Lemay	LHP	Kwantlen College	No		
35	Lynn Henry	OF	Buras High School	No		
36	Michael Burgher	OF	Shorecrest High School	No		
37	Jeremy Brown	OF	Pratt Community College	Yes	2005–2007	AAA
38	Justin Crist	2B	Chandler–Gilbert Community College	Yes	2004–2005	A
39	Michael Branham	RHP	Jesuit High School	No		
40	Brandon Carter	SS	Old Dominion University	Yes	2004–2010	A
41	Troy Grundy	RHP	Carbon High School	No		
42	Christopher Johnson	RHP	Cabell Midland High School	No		
43	David Bilardello	LHP	Vero Beach High School	No; Cardinals-2007	2007–2011	A+
44	Kyle Rapp	LHP	Wabash Valley College	No		
45	Mike Hernandez	OF	Connors State College	No; Tigers-2006	2006–2014	AA
46	Andrew Brewer	RHP	Metro Christian Academy	No		
47	Bobby Bratton	SS	Central High School	No	2008	Ind
48	Joe Norrito	RHP	Nova Southeastern University	Yes	2004–2009	AAA
49	Scott Bates	C	Salado High School	No		
50	Ross Hoffman	1B	Bakersfield College	No		
