= 2005 Los Angeles Dodgers season =

2005 Los Angeles Dodgers
- League: National League
- Division: West
- Ballpark: Dodger Stadium
- City: Los Angeles
- Record: 71–91 (.438)
- Divisional place: 4th
- Owners: Frank McCourt
- President: Jamie McCourt
- General managers: Paul DePodesta
- Managers: Jim Tracy
- Television: FSN West 2 KCOP (13) (Vin Scully, Charley Steiner, Steve Lyons)
- Radio: KFWB (Vin Scully, Rick Monday, Charley Steiner, Al Downing); KWKW; Jaime Jarrín, Pepe Yñiguez, Fernando Valenzuela

The 2005 Los Angeles Dodgers season was the 116th season for the Los Angeles Dodgers franchise in Major League Baseball (MLB), their 48th season in Los Angeles, California, and their 43rd season playing their home games at Dodger Stadium in Los Angeles California.

The Dodgers suffered from a rash of injuries to key players such as closer Éric Gagné, shortstop César Izturis and outfielder J. D. Drew and fell to their second worst record in Los Angeles history, finishing in fourth place in the National League West. After the season, manager Jim Tracy and General Manager Paul DePodesta were both fired and the team was torn apart. This was also the last season to be broadcast on KCOP (13).

== Offseason ==
- January 11, 2005: Acquired Dioner Navarro, William Juarez, Danny Muegge and Beltrán Pérez from the Arizona Diamondbacks for Shawn Green and cash.
- March 20, 2005: Acquired Jason Phillips from the New York Mets for Kaz Ishii.
- March 30, 2005: Traded David Ross to the Pittsburgh Pirates for cash considerations.

== Regular season ==
=== Season standings ===
==== National League West ====
NL West
Team	W	L	Pct.	GB	Home	Road
San Diego Padres	82	80	.506	—	46‍–‍35	36‍–‍45
Arizona Diamondbacks	77	85	.475	5	36‍–‍45	41‍–‍40
San Francisco Giants	75	87	.463	7	37‍–‍44	38‍–‍43
Los Angeles Dodgers	71	91	.438	11	40‍–‍41	31‍–‍50
Colorado Rockies	67	95	.414	15	40‍–‍41	27‍–‍54

==== Record vs. opponents ====
2005 National League record Source: MLB Standings Grid – 2005
Team	AZ	ATL	CHC	CIN	COL	FLA	HOU	LAD	MIL	NYM	PHI	PIT	SD	SF	STL	WAS	AL
Arizona	—	3–3	5–2	2–4	11–7	2–4	3–3	13–5	2–4	1–6	3–4	3–4	10–9	7–11	2–5	2–4	8–10
Atlanta	3–3	—	6–1	7–3	2–4	10–8	5–1	3–3	3–3	13–6	9–10	4–3	1–5	4–2	3–3	10–9	7–8
Chicago	2–5	1–6	—	6–9	4–3	5–4	9–7	4–2	7–9	2–4	2–4	11–5	4–3	5–2	10–6	1–5	6–9
Cincinnati	4–2	3–7	9–6	—	3–3	2–4	4–12	3–4	6–10	3–3	3–4	9–7	4–2	3–5	5–11	5–1	7-8
Colorado	7–11	4–2	3–4	3–3	—	3–3	1–5	11–8	1–5	3–4	2–4	3–7	7–11	7–11	4–4	2–4	6–9
Florida	4–2	8–10	4–5	4–2	3–3	—	4–3	5–2	3–4	8–10	9–10	3–4	2–4	4–2	3–4	9–9	10–5
Houston	3–3	1–5	7–9	12–4	5–1	3-4	—	4–2	10–5	5–5	6–0	9–7	4–3	3–4	5–11	5–2	7–8
Los Angeles	5–13	3–3	2–4	4–3	8–11	2–5	2–4	—	5–1	3–3	3–3	5–2	11–7	9–10	2–5	2–4	5–13
Milwaukee	4–2	3–3	9–7	10–6	5–1	4–3	5–10	1–5	—	3–3	4–5	9–7	3–4	4–3	5–11	4–4	8–7
New York	6–1	6–13	4–2	3–3	4–3	10–8	5–5	3–3	3–3	—	11–7	3–3	4–2	3–3	2–5	11–8	5–10
Philadelphia	4-3	10–9	4–2	4–3	4–2	10–9	0–6	3–3	5–4	7–11	—	4–3	6–0	5–1	4–2	11–8	7–8
Pittsburgh	4–3	3–4	5–11	7–9	7–3	4–3	7–9	2–5	7–9	3–3	3–4	—	3–4	2–4	4–12	1–5	5–7
San Diego	9–10	5–1	3–4	2–4	11–7	4–2	3–4	7–11	4–3	2–4	0–6	4–3	—	12–6	4–3	5–1	7–11
San Francisco	11–7	2–4	2–5	5–3	11–7	2–4	4–3	10–9	3–4	3–3	1–5	4–2	6–12	—	2–4	3–3	6–12
St. Louis	5–2	3–3	6–10	11–5	4–4	4-3	11–5	5–2	11–5	5–2	2–4	12–4	3–4	4–2	—	4–2	10–5
Washington	4–2	9–10	5–1	1–5	4–2	9-9	2–5	4–2	4–4	8–11	8–11	5–1	1–5	3–3	2–4	—	12–6

=== Opening Day lineup ===
Opening Day starters
Name	Position
César Izturis	Shortstop
Hee-Seop Choi	First baseman
J. D. Drew	Right fielder
Jeff Kent	Second baseman
Milton Bradley	Center fielder
José Valentín	Third baseman
Ricky Ledée	Left fielder
Jason Phillips	Catcher
Derek Lowe	Starting pitcher

=== Notable transactions ===
- August 9, 2005: Acquired José Cruz Jr. from the Boston Red Sox for a player to be named later (Tony Schrager).

=== Roster ===
2005 Los Angeles Dodgers
Roster
Pitchers: 47 Wilson Álvarez; 43 Yhency Brazobán; 51 Jonathan Broxton; 58 Buddy Carlyle; 55 Giovanni Carrara; 46 Elmer Dessens; 15 Scott Erickson; 38 Éric Gagné; 27 D. J. Houlton; 58 Edwin Jackson; 56 Hong-Chih Kuo; 23 Derek Lowe; 57 Franquelis Osoria; 31 Brad Penny; 45 Odalis Pérez; 50 Duaner Sánchez; 40 Steve Schmoll; 56 Derek Thompson; 36 Jeff Weaver; 59 Kelly Wunsch	Catchers: 18 Paul Bako; 41 Dioner Navarro; 9 Jason Phillips; 54 Mike Rose; Infielders: 49 Willy Aybar; 5 Hee-Seop Choi; 25 Mike Edwards; 3 César Izturis; 12 Jeff Kent; 52 Brian Myrow; 66 Norihiro Nakamura; 26 Antonio Perez; 13 Óscar Robles; 8 Olmedo Sáenz; 10 José Valentín	Outfielders: 21 Milton Bradley; 52 Chin-Feng Chen; 22 José Cruz Jr.; 7 J. D. Drew; 6 Jason Grabowski; 33 Ricky Ledée; 17 Jason Repko; 49 Cody Ross; 28 Jayson Werth	Manager: 16 Jim Tracy; Coaches: 48 Jim Colborn (pitching); 44 Jon Debus (bullpen); 35 Glenn Hoffman (third base); 14 Jim Lett (bench); 11 Manny Mota; 30 John Shelby (1st base); 29 Tim Wallach (hitting)

== Game log ==
=== Regular season ===
Legend
	Dodgers win
	Dodgers loss
	Postponement
	Eliminated from playoff race
**Bold**	Dodgers team member

2005 regular season game log: 71–91 (Home: 40–41; Away: 31–50)
April: 15–8 (Home: 7–3; Away: 8–5)

#	Date	Time (PT)	Opponent	Score	Win	Loss	Save	Time of Game	Attendance	Record	Box Streak
4	April 8		@ Diamondbacks	**W** 8–7						3–1	W3
5	April 9		@ Diamondbacks	**W** 12–10 (11)						4–1	W4
6	April 10		@ Diamondbacks	L 4–5						4–2	L1

May: 11–17 (Home: 5–10; Away: 6–7)

#	Date	Time (PT)	Opponent	Score	Win	Loss	Save	Time of Game	Attendance	Record	Box Streak

June: 11–16 (Home: 9–5; Away: 2–11)

#	Date	Time (PT)	Opponent	Score	Win	Loss	Save	Time of Game	Attendance	Record	Box Streak

July: 10–17 (Home: 5–9; Away: 5–8)

#	Date	Time (PT)	Opponent	Score	Win	Loss	Save	Time of Game	Attendance	Record	Box Streak
—	July 12	5:00 p.m. PDT	76th All-Star Game	National League vs. American League (Comerica Park, Detroit, Michigan)							

August: 14–14 (Home: 6–6; Away: 8–8)

#	Date	Time (PT)	Opponent	Score	Win	Loss	Save	Time of Game	Attendance	Record	Box Streak

September: 9–18 (Home: 8–8; Away: 1–10)

#	Date	Time (PT)	Opponent	Score	Win	Loss	Save	Time of Game	Attendance	Record	Box Streak

October: 1–1 (Home: 0–0; Away: 1–1)

#	Date	Time (PT)	Opponent	Score	Win	Loss	Save	Time of Game	Attendance	Record	Box Streak

== Starting Pitchers stats ==
Note: G = Games pitched; GS = Games started; IP = Innings pitched; W/L = Wins/Losses; ERA = Earned run average; BB = Walks allowed; SO = Strikeouts; CG = Complete games

Name	G	GS	IP	W/L	ERA	BB	SO	CG
Jeff Weaver	34	34	224.0	14-11	4.22	43	157	3
Derek Lowe	35	35	222.0	12-15	3.61	55	146	2
Brad Penny	29	29	175.1	7-9	3.90	41	122	1
D.J. Houlton	35	19	129.0	6-9	5.16	52	90	0
Odalis Pérez	19	19	108.2	7-8	4.56	28	74	0
Edwin Jackson	7	6	28.2	2-2	6.28	17	13	0
Derek Thompson	4	3	18.0	0-0	3.50	10	13	0

== Relief Pitchers stats ==
Note: G = Games pitched; GS = Games started; IP = Innings pitched; W/L = Wins/Losses; ERA = Earned run average; BB = Walks allowed; SO = Strikeouts; SV = Saves

Name	G	GS	IP	W/L	ERA	BB	SO	SV
Yhency Brazobán	74	0	72.2	2-2	5.33	32	61	21
Duaner Sánchez	79	0	82.0	4-7	3.73	36	71	8
Giovanni Carrara	72	0	75.2	7-4	3.93	38	56	0
Steve Schmoll	48	0	46.2	2-2	5.01	22	29	3
Kelly Wunsch	46	0	23.2	1-1	4.56	14	22	0
Elmer Dessens	28	7	65.2	1-2	3.56	19	37	0
Scott Erickson	19	8	55.1	1-4	6.02	25	15	0
Franquelis Osoria	24	0	29.2	0-2	3.94	8	15	0
Wilson Álvarez	21	2	24.0	1-4	5.63	7	16	0
Buddy Carlyle	10	0	14.0	0-0	8.36	4	13	0
Jonathan Broxton	14	0	13.2	1-0	5.93	12	22	0
Éric Gagné	14	0	13.1	1-0	2.70	3	22	8
Hong-Chih Kuo	9	0	5.1	0-1	6.75	5	10	0

== Batting Stats ==
Note: Pos = Position; G = Games played; AB = At bats; Avg. = Batting average; R = Runs scored; H = Hits; HR = Home runs; RBI = Runs batted in; SB = Stolen bases

Name	Pos	G	AB	Avg.	R	H	HR	RBI	SB
Jason Phillips	C/1B	121	399	.238	38	95	10	55	0
Dioner Navarro	C	50	176	.273	21	48	3	14	0
Paul Bako	C	13	40	.250	1	10	0	4	0
Mike Rose	C	15	43	.209	2	9	1	1	0
Hee-Seop Choi	1B	133	320	.253	40	81	15	42	1
Jeff Kent	2B/1B	149	553	.289	100	160	29	105	6
César Izturis	SS	106	444	.257	48	114	2	31	8
Mike Edwards	3B/LF	88	239	.247	23	59	3	15	1
Óscar Robles	3B/SS/2B	110	364	.272	44	99	5	34	0
Olmedo Sáenz	1B/3B/DH	109	319	.263	39	84	15	63	0
Antonio Perez	3B/2B/SS	98	259	.297	28	77	3	23	11
José Valentín	3B/LF	56	147	.170	17	25	2	14	3
Willy Aybar	3B/2B	26	86	.326	12	28	1	10	3
Norihiro Nakamura	3B/1B	17	39	.128	1	5	0	3	0
Brian Myrow	1B	19	20	.200	2	4	0	0	0
J. D. Drew	RF/CF	72	252	.286	48	72	15	36	1
Milton Bradley	CF	75	283	.290	49	82	13	38	6
Ricky Ledée	LF/RF	102	237	.278	31	66	7	39	0
Jason Repko	LF/CF/RF	129	276	.221	43	61	8	30	5
Jayson Werth	LF/RF/CF	102	337	.234	46	79	7	11	
José Cruz Jr.	RF	47	156	.301	23	47	6	22	0
Jason Grabowski	LF	65	112	.161	14	18	4	12	1
Cody Ross	RF	14	25	.160	1	4	0	1	0
Chin-Feng Chen	LF	7	8	.250	1	2	0	2	0

== 2005 Awards ==
- 2005 Major League Baseball All-Star Game
  - Jeff Kent starting second baseman
  - César Izturis reserve
- Silver Slugger Award
  - Jeff Kent

== Farm system ==
Level	Team	League	Manager
AAA	Las Vegas 51s	Pacific Coast League	Jerry Royster
**AA**	**Jacksonville Suns**	**Southern League**	**John Shoemaker**
High A	Vero Beach Dodgers	Florida State League	Scott Little
A	Columbus Catfish	South Atlantic League	Travis Barbary
Rookie	Ogden Raptors	Pioneer League	Juan Bustabad
Rookie	Gulf Coast Dodgers	Gulf Coast League	Luis Salazar
Rookie	DSL Dodgers	Dominican Summer League	

Teams in BOLD won the League Championship

== Major League Baseball draft ==
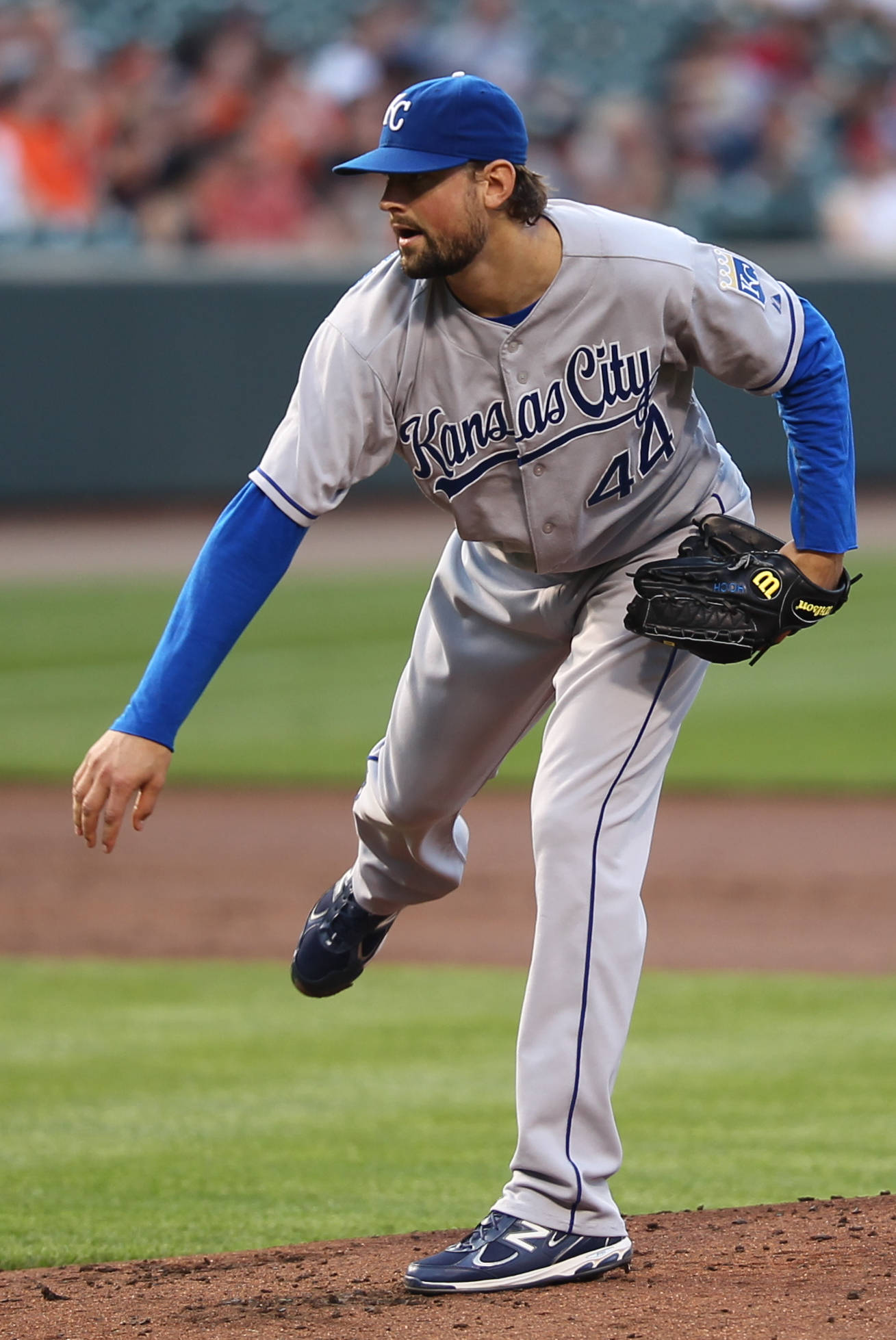
Luke Hochevar

The Dodgers selected 51 players in this draft. Of those, 13 of them would eventually play Major League baseball. They lost their first round draft pick as a result of signing free agent Derek Lowe but gained a supplemental first round pick and a second round pick as compensation for the loss of free agent Adrián Beltré.

The first round pick was right-handed pitcher Luke Hochevar out of the University of Tennessee. After a long and controversial negotiation period, Hochevar backed out on a deal to sign with the Dodgers and would re-enter the draft the following year where he signed with the Kansas City Royals.

While several members of this years draft class would make the Majors, none were more than role players.

2005 draft picks

Round	Name	Position	School	Signed	Career span	Highest level
1s	Luke Hochevar	RHP	University of Tennessee	No; Royals-2006	2006–2016	**MLB**
2	Iván DeJesús Jr.	SS	American Military Academy	Yes	2005–2022	**MLB**
2	Josh Wall	RHP	Central Private High School	Yes	2005–2016	**MLB**
3	Sergio Pedroza	OF	California State University, Fullerton	Yes	2005–2012	AAA
4	Josh Bell	3B	Santaluces Community High School	Yes	2005–2019	**MLB**
5	Jon Meloan	RHP	University of Arizona	Yes	2005–2014	**MLB**
6	Brent Leach	LHP	Delta State University	Yes	2005–2015	**MLB**
7	Christopher Hobdy	RHP	Monterey High School	Yes	2005	Rookie
8	David Horlacher	RHP	Brigham Young University	Yes	2005–2006	A
9	Michael Davitt	RHP	Davidson High School	No; Angels-2007	2007–2009	A
10	Trayvon Robinson	OF	Crenshaw High School	Yes	2005–2024	**MLB**
11	Adam Godwin	OF	Troy University	Yes	2005–2014	AAA
12	Kristopher Krise	RHP	California State University, Chico	Yes	2005–2007	Rookie
13	Steve Johnson	RHP	St. Paul's School	Yes	2005–2018	**MLB**
14	Scott Van Slyke	OF	John Burroughs High School	Yes	2005–2018	**MLB**
15	Wilfredo Diaz	LHP		Yes	2005–2008	A
16	George McDonald	C	Westchester High School	No		
17	Kyle Henson	C	Oak Ridge High School	No; Giants-2009	2009	A-
18	Kevin Carby	SS	Booker T. Washington High School	No	2010–2011	Ind
19	Drew Locke	OF	Boston College	Yes	2005–2012	AAA
20	Skyler Tripp	LHP	Davis County High School	Yes	2006	Rookie
21	Shane Justis	SS	Towson University	Yes	2005–2009	AA
22	Travis DeBondt	OF	Oral Roberts University	No		
23	Jayson Whitehouse	OF	Spartanburg Methodist College	No		
24	Jon Dutton	LHP	Rancho Bernardo High School	Yes	2006–2010	A
25	Kyle Foster	LHP	Lower Columbia College	No		
26	Jordy Mercer	SS	Taloga High School	No; Pirates-2008	2008–2021	**MLB**
27	Matt Coburn	RHP	Humble High School	No	2009–2010	Ind
28	Timothy Segelke	LHP	Green River Community College	No		
29	Kent Williamson	RHP	Hayden High School	No		
30	Kyle Morgan	OF	Bakersfield College	No; Pirates-2008	2008–2010	A
31	Jonathan Forest	RHP		No; Phillies-2007	2007	Rookie
32	Nathan Hammons	LHP	Fort Cobb High School	No		
33	Chris Lemay	LHP		Yes	2006	Rookie
34	Shawn Loglisci	RHP	College of Southern Idaho	No		
35	Rick Taloa	1B	Santa Ana College	Yes	2005–2007	A
36	Andrew Marquardt	RHP	St. Francis High School	No		
37	Justin Wilson	LHP	Dr. Floyd B. Buchanan High School	No; Pirates-2009	2009–2025	**MLB**
38	Stephen Hermann	C	Penn-Trafford High School	No		
39	Jake Debus	LHP	Victor J. Andrew High School	No		
40	Jason Mooneyham	1B	Chapman University	Yes	2005–2007	A+
41	Christopher Johnson	RHP	John A. Logan College	No		
42	Tony Cruz	C	Okaloosa-Walton College	No; Cardinals-2007	2007–2018	**MLB**
43	Brandon Rocha	C	Los Alamitos High School	No		
44	Chase d'Arnaud	SS	Los Alamitos High School	No; Pirates-2008	2008–2019	**MLB**
45	Brian Mathews	3B	Newton High School	Yes	2006–2009	A+
46	Anthony Benner	3B	Eastlake High School	No; Nationals-2007	2007	A-
47	Mark Sunga	3B	Notre Dame High School	No		
48	Paul Wourms	C	Thompson Rivers University	No		
49	Garet Hill	RHP	Biola University	No; Phillies-2006	2006–2007	A
50	Mitchell Houck	LHP	Cypress Bay High School	No; Mets-2008	2008–2010	A
