= Brett Tomko =

American baseball player (born 1973)

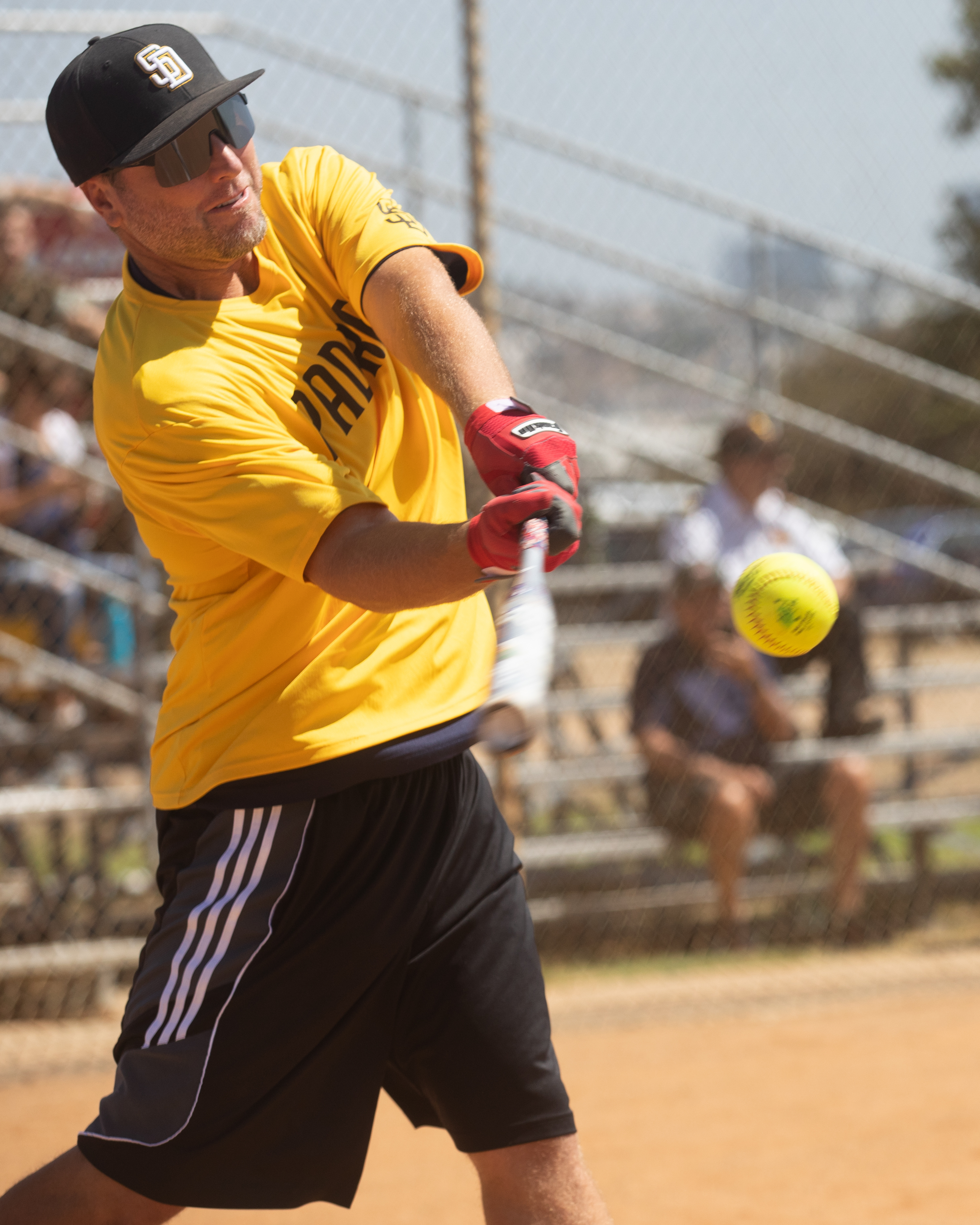
- Tomko at Marine Corps Recruit Depot San Diego in 2021
- Pitcher
- Born: April 7, 1973 (age 53); Euclid, Ohio, U.S.
- Batted: Right Threw: Right

MLB debut
- May 27, 1997, for the Cincinnati Reds

Last MLB appearance
- May 24, 2011, for the Texas Rangers

MLB statistics
- Win–loss record: 100–103
- Earned run average: 4.65
- Strikeouts: 1,209
- Stats at Baseball Reference

Teams
- Cincinnati Reds (1997–1999); Seattle Mariners (2000–2001); San Diego Padres (2002); St. Louis Cardinals (2003); San Francisco Giants (2004–2005); Los Angeles Dodgers (2006–2007); San Diego Padres (2007); Kansas City Royals (2008); San Diego Padres (2008); New York Yankees (2009); Oakland Athletics (2009); Texas Rangers (2011)

Brett Daniel Tomko (born April 7, 1973) is an American former professional baseball pitcher. He played in Major League Baseball (MLB) for the Cincinnati Reds, San Diego Padres, Seattle Mariners, St. Louis Cardinals, San Francisco Giants, Los Angeles Dodgers, New York Yankees, Oakland Athletics, Texas Rangers, and Kansas City Royals.

== Early life ==
Tomko was born in Euclid, Ohio, but moved to southern California when he was three years old. He attended El Dorado High School in Placentia, California, and was a letter winner in basketball and baseball. El Dorado has since retired his #20 uniform number. Tomko was drafted by the Los Angeles Dodgers in the 20th round of the 1994 Major League Baseball draft, but did not sign.

== College career ==
Tomko attended college at Mt. San Antonio College (Walnut, California) in 1994. He then transferred to Florida Southern College for one season in 1995. At Florida Southern, Tomko led the team to the NCAA Division II National Championship against Georgia College. He went 15–2 with a 1.35 ERA and struck out 154 batters in 126.3 innings that season, with opponents hitting just .180 against him. He pitched two complete game shutouts in the Championship Series, including one in the final game, earning him the Tournament's "outstanding player" award. In addition, he won both the NCAA Division II Pitcher and Player of the Year Awards by the American Baseball Coaches Association.

In 2014, the NCAA Division II Pitcher of the Year Award was renamed the Brett Tomko Award in his honor. His uniform number, #35, has since been retired by Florida Southern.

== Professional career ==
=== Cincinnati Reds ===
Tomko was drafted by the Cincinnati Reds in the second round, with the 54th overall selection, of the 1995 Major League Baseball draft; he signed with the team on June 28, 1995. He moved quickly through the Reds minor league system, debuting for the Charleston AlleyCats in Single-A that same year and pitching to a 1.89 ERA in nine games. In 1996, Baseball America named him the Reds' fifth best prospect. He moved to Double-A with the Chattanooga Lookouts and held a 3.88 ERA with 164 strikeouts in 157 2/3 innings. In 1997, Tomko was considered the Reds' top prospect by Baseball America. He moved up to Triple-A, pitching to a 2.95 ERA in 10 starts for the Indianapolis Indians, before getting called up to the Major Leagues.

Tomko made his Major League debut against the Philadelphia Phillies on May 27, 1997. He pitched six innings and gave up two runs while taking the loss in the Reds 2–1 defeat. He got his first victory in his next start on June 6, against the New York Mets. He pitched six innings, gave up one run and struck out seven, while also driving in the go-ahead run for his first MLB hit, in the Reds 5–2 victory. That year, Tomko finished with an 11–7 record and a 3.43 ERA in 126 innings. He was third on the team in Wins Above Replacement (WAR) with 3.0. He finished seventh in the voting for the National League (NL) Rookie of the Year award.

Tomko followed up on his rookie season by going 13–12 with a 4.44 ERA while leading the team with 210 2/3 innings pitched in 1998. In 1999, Tomko left spring training as the Reds no. 3 starter. However, he was briefly demoted to the minors after allowing 23 earned runs on 32 hits in his first five starts. He finished the year with a 4.92 ERA in 172 innings, finishing the season out in the bullpen.

=== Seattle Mariners ===
On February 10, 2000, Tomko was traded to the Seattle Mariners, along with Mike Cameron, Antonio Pérez, and Jake Meyer for Ken Griffey Jr. Tomko did not make the team out of spring training that year, due to dealing with a sore Achilles tendon. Tomko made his Mariners debut on April 22, allowing one run on four hits while striking out seven in six innings of work. In June, he was placed on the disabled list with a shoulder injury. When he returned, Tomko was used out of the bullpen for the rest of the season.

Tomko's 2001 season started off poorly after pitching to a 5.97 ERA in nine appearances in the rotation and bullpen. He was demoted to Triple-A on May 20. Tomko threw a no-hitter for the Tacoma Rainiers on July 3. During his time in Tacoma, he learned to throw a sinker. When rosters expanded in September, he asked to stay with the team during their playoff push rather than return to the majors. He did not return to the Mariners until September 14.

=== San Diego Padres ===
On December 11, 2001, the Mariners traded Tomko (along with Ramón Vázquez, Tom Lampkin, and cash) to the San Diego Padres in exchange for Ben Davis, Wascar Serrano, and Alex Arias. Tomko returned to the starting rotation for the 2002 season, making 32 starts and pitching to a 4.49 ERA in 204 1/3 innings.

=== St. Louis Cardinals ===
On December 15, 2002, Tomko was traded again, almost exactly a year later to the St. Louis Cardinals in exchange for Mike Wodnicki and Luther Hackman. Tomko won 13 games in his only season in St. Louis, despite a 5.28 ERA in 202 2/3 innings of work. He also led the NL in hits and earned runs allowed.

=== San Francisco Giants ===
On January 9, 2004, Tomko signed with the San Francisco Giants as a free agent. The deal included an option for the 2005 season as well. The first few months of the season went poorly for Tomko. He pitched to a 5.86 ERA in 12 starts through June 7, when he left in the fifth inning with an injury. He was later placed on the disabled list with elbow inflammation. After returning on June 24, he managed a 3.09 ERA in 128 innings to finish out the year. On August 26, he pitched a complete game shutout against the Florida Marlins. Tomko had a similar 2005 season, compiling a 4.48 ERA in 190 2/3 innings.

=== Los Angeles Dodgers ===
On December 21, 2005, Tomko agreed to a two-year, $8.7 million contract with the Los Angeles Dodgers. Tomko pitched to a 5.12 ERA in 15 starts for the Dodgers in 2005 before hitting the disabled list with an oblique injury. When he returned in late July, he was relegated to the bullpen for the rest of the season. He managed a 3.64 ERA in 29 2/3 innings as a late-inning reliever.

In 2007, Tomko pitched both as a starter and a reliever during the season. He had a 5.80 ERA in 104 innings for the Dodgers. On August 24, he was designated for assignment by Los Angeles. During his time with the Dodgers, Tomko's poor pitching and propensity to give up home runs led to Dodger fans giving him the nickname "Bombko".

=== San Diego Padres (second stint) ===
After being released by the Dodgers, Tomko signed with the San Diego Padres on September 4, 2007. Because of when he signed with the team, Tomko was ineligible for the playoffs. He allowed 14 runs on 25 hits in 27 1/3 innings between the bullpen and rotation down the stretch.

Tomko started the last game of the season, with the Padres needing a win to clinch the NL Wild Card. He ultimately surrendered five runs in 4 1/3 innings in what was an eventual 11–6 loss against the Milwaukee Brewers. This resulted in the NL Wild Card tie-breaker game against the Colorado Rockies, which the Padres lost in 13 innings.

=== Kansas City Royals ===
On January 20, 2008, Tomko signed a one-year, $3 million contract with the Kansas City Royals. He pitched to a 4.81 ERA with 40 strikeouts in 60 1/3 innings of work as a starter and reliever. On June 12, the Royals designated Tomko for assignment.

=== San Diego Padres (third stint) ===
On June 27, 2008, after being released by the Royals, Tomko once again signed with the San Diego Padres. He pitched in just two games before hitting the disabled list with an elbow strain. Tomko was activated on August 19, but was ultimately released on September 1.

=== New York Yankees ===
On February 13, 2009, the New York Yankees signed Tomko to a minor league contract with an invitation to spring training. He began the season with Triple-A Scranton as a reliever but was called up by the Yankees on May 9. Tomko allowed 12 runs on 19 hits across 15 appearances out of the Yankees bullpen. Tomko was designated for assignment on July 21 to make room on the roster for Sergio Mitre. He was given his out right release on July 29. Tomko criticized the Yankees for not using him enough, despite his excellent spring training and minor league numbers, and said his 5.25 ERA was due to a lack of use.

=== Oakland Athletics ===
On August 4, 2009, Tomko signed a minor league contract with the Oakland Athletics and was assigned to the Triple-A Sacramento River Cats. On August 17, Tomko defeated the Yankees in his first start for Oakland. Tomko got his 100th career win, however he injured his arm during the game. He missed the rest of the season after he was diagnosed with nerve damage.

Tomko re-signed with Oakland during the offseason and spent the entire 2010 season rehabbing with Triple-A Sacramento.

=== Texas Rangers ===
On February 19, 2011, the Texas Rangers signed Tomko to a minor league contract with no invitation to spring training. On April 20, the Rangers purchased Tomko's contract, adding him to their active roster. He allowed nine runs on 15 hits across eight appearances for the Rangers before he was removed from the 40-man roster and sent outright to the Triple-A Round Rock Express on May 27. On September 30, Tomko elected for free agency.

=== Cincinnati Reds (second stint) ===
On February 19, 2012, Tomko signed a minor league contract with the Cincinnati Reds worth $480,000. He was on the minor league disabled list for the month of June and most of July with a shoulder injury. Tomko logged an 0–6 record with a 3.78 ERA and 48 strikeouts in 12 starts for the Triple-A Louisville Bats. On August 2, he was released by the Reds organization.

=== Arizona Diamondbacks ===
Tomko signed a minor league contract with the Arizona Diamondbacks on August 14, 2012. He was subsequently assigned to the Double-A Mobile BayBears. On August 24, Tomko was called up to Triple-A and helped the Reno Aces capture the 2012 Pacific Coast League championship.

=== York Revolution ===
On March 22, 2013, Tomko signed a contract with the York Revolution of the independent Atlantic League of Professional Baseball. In 19 starts for York, he had a 4–8 record and 4.98 ERA with 90 strikeouts across 124 2/3 innings pitched. Tomko retired in August chance to complete scout and player development school with the Kansas City Royals organization in the hopes of catching on as a professional coach or scout.

=== Kansas City Royals (second stint) ===
On November 20, 2013, Tomko signed with Leones del Escogido in the Dominican Professional Baseball League. Thanks to a strong performance, he had half a dozen MLB teams interested in signing him. On March 14, 2014, Tomko agreed to a minor league contract with the Kansas City Royals. In nine appearances (eight starts) for the Triple-A Omaha Storm Chasers, he posted a 4–3 record and 3.80 ERA with 32 strikeouts across 47 1/3 innings pitched. On June 3, Tomko was released by the Royals organization.

=== Colorado Rockies ===
Tomko signed a minor league contract with the Colorado Rockies on June 10, 2014. He had a 5.85 ERA with 28 strikeouts in 40 innings pitched across 10 starts for the Triple-A Colorado Springs Sky Sox.

== Post-playing career ==
In 2016, Tomko played for the Kansas Stars, a team of former Major League players formed by Nate Robertson and Adam LaRoche to participate in the National Baseball Congress World Series. He returned for the 2017 tournament, which the Stars won. Tomko pitched in the 2019 Hall of Fame Classic at Doubleday Field in Cooperstown.

In 2022, Tomko joined USA Baseball and served as a pitching coach for the 16U/17U National Team Development Program. He worked in the same capacity for the 13U/14U Athlete Development Program in 2023.

== Personal life ==
Tomko married Playboy Playmate Julia Schultz (February 1998) in November 2003, and they have twin boys.

Tomko is an artist. In 2017, he was training with famous sports artist Opie Otterstad.

In 1970, Tomko's father won a contest to name the new NBA expansion team in Cleveland. Out of over 11,000 entries in The Plain Dealer, the name Cleveland Cavaliers was picked. His entry described the name Cavaliers as "a group of daring, fearless men whose life's pact was never surrender, no matter what the odds."
