= Derek Thompson (baseball) =

American baseball player (born 1981)

- Pitcher
- Born: January 8, 1981 (age 45); Tampa, Florida
- Batted: Left Threw: Left

MLB debut
- May 28, 2005, for the Los Angeles Dodgers

Last MLB appearance
- June 23, 2005, for the Los Angeles Dodgers

MLB statistics
- Win–loss: 0-0
- Earned run average: 3.50
- Strikeouts: 13
- Stats at Baseball Reference

Teams
- Los Angeles Dodgers (2005)

Derek Ryan Thompson (born January 8, 1981) is an American former professional baseball pitcher. He played in Major League Baseball for the Los Angeles Dodgers during the 2005 season.

He was drafted by the Cleveland Indians in the 1st round of the 2000 Major League Baseball draft and pitched in the Indians minor league system for the Burlington Indians (2000), Columbus Indians (2001–2002) and Kinston Indians (2002). He was drafted by the Chicago Cubs in the Rule 5 draft on December 16, 2002, and then sold to the Los Angeles Dodgers. For the Dodgers he played for the Jacksonville Suns in 2004 & 2005, appearing in the Southern League All-Star Game in 2004.

Thompson pitched briefly for Triple-A Las Vegas in 2005 before he was called up to the Los Angeles Dodgers. He started 3 games for the Dodgers in 2005. He was released by the Dodgers after the season, and signed a minor league contract with the Oakland Athletics.

== See also ==
- Rule 5 draft results
