= The University of Texas National Championship 2005 =

2006 painting by Opie Otterstad

The University of Texas National Championship 2005 by Opie Otterstad.

The University of Texas National Championship 2005 is a painting by Opie Otterstad. It was commissioned in 2006 by The University of Texas at Austin to commemorate the 2005 Texas Longhorns football team who won the 2005 NCAA Division I-A national football championship in college football. The Longhorns secured the championship by defeating the University of Southern California Trojans in the 2006 Rose Bowl.

The painting was officially unveiled May 6 and 7, 2006, at a gallery called Art on 5th. The work is oil on canvas. Following his usual practice, Otterstad completed the painting without the use of paint brushes. The painting consists of 15 separate images, each painted on a separate canvas and then stitched together to form a single work measuring approximately 5 feet high by 8 feet wide (1.52 by 2.44 metres). Each image features one moment from either the championship game or the ensuing Texas celebration.

Some figures from past Texas seasons are also included in the background, such as James Street handing off to Billy Dale which was a famous play from the 1969 championship. Darrell Royal's face appears as a shadow behind the image of Mack Brown holding aloft the championship trophy.
