= Jason Phillips (catcher) =

American baseball player and coach (born 1976)

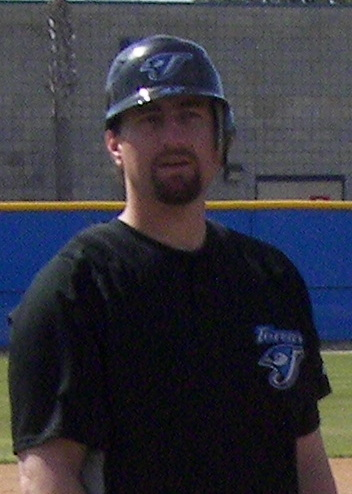
- Phillips with the Blue Jays in 2007
- Catcher / First baseman
- Born: September 27, 1976 (age 48); La Mesa, California, U.S.
- Batted: Right Threw: Right

MLB debut
- September 19, 2001, for the New York Mets

Last MLB appearance
- July 18, 2007, for the Toronto Blue Jays

MLB statistics
- Batting average: .249
- Home runs: 30
- Runs batted in: 168
- Stats at Baseball Reference

Teams
- New York Mets (2001–2004); Los Angeles Dodgers (2005); Toronto Blue Jays (2006–2007)

Jason Lloyd Phillips (born September 27, 1976) is an American professional baseball player and coach. He is the bullpen coach for the Trenton Thunder of the Class AA Eastern League. He played as a catcher and first baseman in Major League Baseball for the New York Mets, Los Angeles Dodgers, and Toronto Blue Jays.

== Playing career ==
Jason made his major league debut with the New York Mets on September 19, 2001. In 2003, Phillips was tried out at first base and was also a backup catcher to Mike Piazza. That season he broke out, batting .298 with 11 home runs and 58 RBI. In 2004, his offensive numbers dropped sharply, but through the entire season he only made one error. On March 20, 2005, he was traded to the Los Angeles Dodgers for pitcher Kazuhisa Ishii. His offensive production improved slightly, and he recorded a career high in starts and games as a backstop.

On January 3, 2006, Phillips signed a minor league contract with the Toronto Blue Jays. He also received an invitation to spring training where he and Guillermo Quiróz were slated to compete for the backup catching job behind incumbent starter Gregg Zaun. However, with the signing of Bengie Molina, it seemed unlikely that either of them would get the backup spot. Quiroz was later claimed off waivers by the Seattle Mariners, and Phillips started the season with the team after Zaun was put on the disabled list. A few days into the regular season, Phillips was designated for assignment on April 7, a day before Zaun came off the disabled list. On April 12, Phillips was outrighted to Triple-A Syracuse. After Shea Hillenbrand was traded in July 2006 to the San Francisco Giants, Phillips was recalled to fill the void in the roster. He was soon outrighted again to Syracuse for Francisco Rosario.

Never known for his speed on the basepaths, Phillips was picked as the slowest active ballplayer by using a formula based on Bill James' speed scores by the Hardball Times in April 2006.

Upon Bengie Molina's departure through free agency to the San Francisco Giants in the winter of 2007, Phillips once again became the Jays' backup catcher and occasional reserve infielder. He was released on July 20, 2007. He was only batting .208 with a home run and 12 RBI.

He would spend 2007 and 08 playing minor league and independent league baseball. He was invited to the Seattle Mariners 2009 spring training camp.

== Coaching career ==
On April 1, 2009, Phillips accepted the Mariners' bullpen catcher position, after his services as a player were no longer required. Before the start of the 2016 season, Phillips joined the Toronto Blue Jays as one of their bullpen catchers.

In 2019, the New York Yankees named Phillips the bullpen coach for the Trenton Thunder of the Class AA Eastern League.
