= Opie Otterstad =

American painter

Opie Otterstad is a painter who specializes in paintings of sports figures and events. He graduated from St. Olaf College with a bachelor's degree in Studio Art and one in Psychology. He is the official artist of the Texas Baseball Hall of Fame.

In 2006, he was commissioned by The University of Texas at Austin to create a painting commemorating the 2005 Texas Longhorns football team who won the NCAA Division I-A national football championship. The painting titled The University of Texas National Championship 2005 was unveiled on May 6, 2006.

== Selected projects ==
- The University of Texas National Championship 2005 (2006).
- MLB World Series celebration paintings (2002–2016).
- Houston Sports Hall of Fame: Walk of Fame fountain mosaic (2022).
