= Justin Orenduff =

American baseball player (born 1983)

- Pitcher
- Born: May 27, 1983 (age 42); Portsmouth, Virginia, U.S.
- Bats: Right Throws: Right
- Stats at Baseball Reference
Medals
Men's baseball
Representing United States
Pan American Games
Silver medal – second place	2003 Santo Domingo	Team competition

Justin A. Orenduff (born May 27, 1983) is an American former professional baseball right-handed pitcher. He previously played Minor League Baseball in the Los Angeles Dodgers organization.

== Career ==
As a freshman at George Washington University he made 28 appearances and was 10–2 with one save and a 1.68 ERA, ranking second in the Atlantic 10 Conference. He transferred to Virginia Commonwealth University for his sophomore season and won Baseball America second team All-American honors and All-Colonial Athletic Association accolades. He pitched for Team U.S.A. during the summer of 2003 in the Pan American Games. He was part of a strong pitching rotation that included Jered Weaver and Justin Verlander. He pitched a shutout in the medal round against Brazil to lead the U.S. team into the semi-finals.

Orenduff was selected by the Los Angeles Dodgers in the 1st round of the 2004 MLB draft and assigned to rookie-class Ogden Raptors for the conclusion of the season.

He split the 2005 season between Single-A Vero Beach Dodgers and Double-A Jacksonville Suns. He was a combined 10–5 with a 3.19 ERA for the two teams and was named to the Florida State League All-Star team.

He was ranked as the 14th best prospect in the Dodgers system after completing the 2006 season for Jacksonville.

Orenduff struggled with the Triple-A Las Vegas 51s at the start of the 2007 season and returned to Jacksonville, where his numbers improved. He then pitched for the Peoria Saguaros of the Arizona Fall League after the 2007 season. He returned to Las Vegas for the 2008 season.

Orenduff was designated for assignment and removed from the 40 man roster on March 8, 2009, to make room for Manny Ramirez. After spending several months in A ball with the Inland Empire 66ers of San Bernardino, Orenduff retired on May 24, 2009.

He decided to end his retirement in 2011 and returned to the Dodgers, where he was assigned to the Rancho Cucamonga Quakes. He appeared in nine games with the Quakes, with an 8.74 ERA and was released on July 14, 2011.
