= Olmedo Sáenz =

Panamanian baseball player (born 1970)

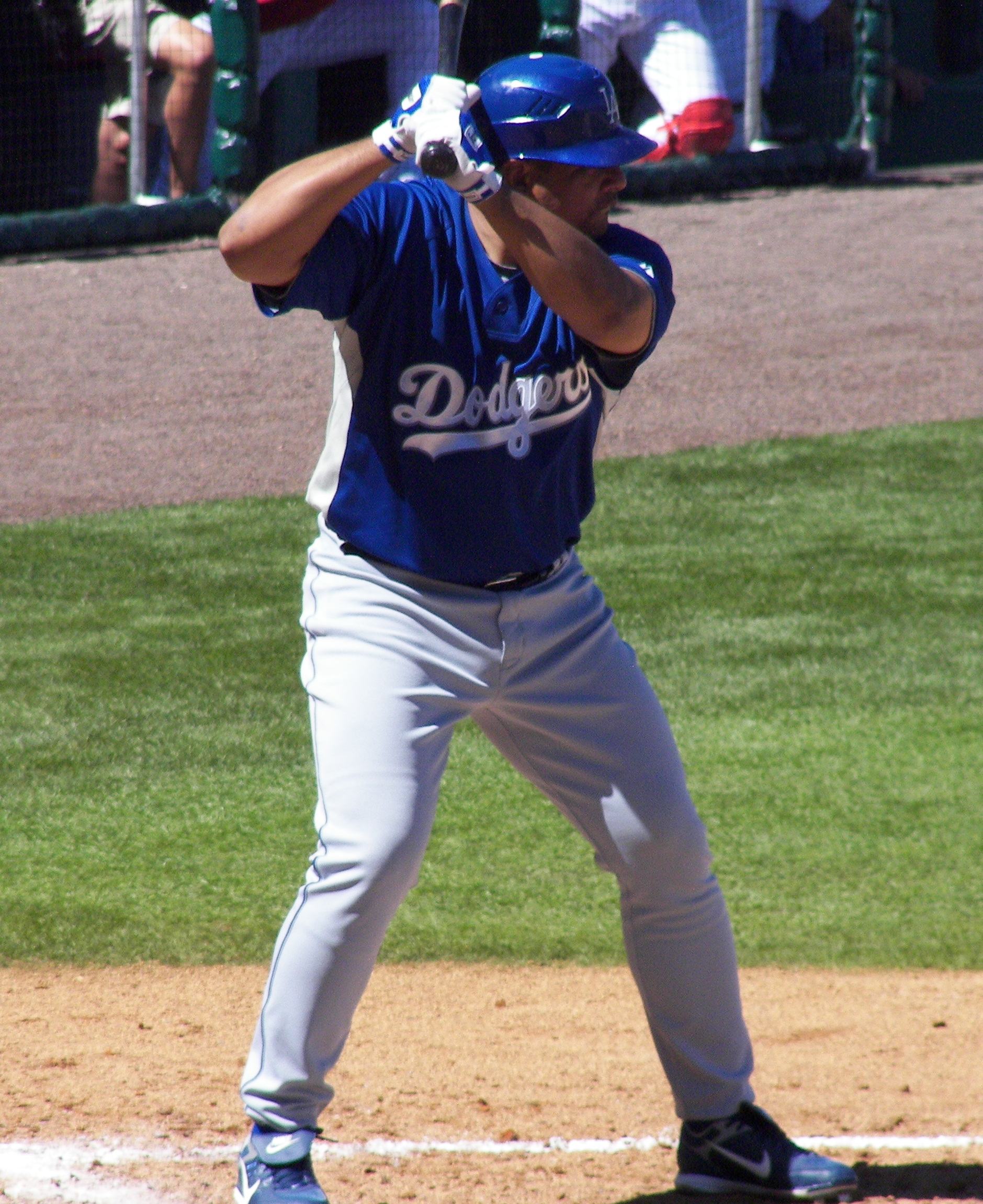
- First baseman / Third baseman
- Born: October 8, 1970 (age 55); Chitré, Panama
- Batted: Right Threw: Right

MLB debut
- May 28, 1994, for the Chicago White Sox

Last MLB appearance
- September 27, 2007, for the Los Angeles Dodgers

MLB statistics
- Batting average: .263
- Home runs: 73
- Runs batted in: 275
- Stats at Baseball Reference

Teams
- Chicago White Sox (1994); Oakland Athletics (1999–2002); Los Angeles Dodgers (2004–2007)

Olmedo Sáenz Sánchez (born October 8, 1970) is a Panamanian former Major League Baseball player. Though primarily a pinch hitter, he occasionally played first base or third base.

== Professional career ==
=== Chicago White Sox ===
Sáenz signed with the Chicago White Sox as an undrafted free agent on May 11, 1990. He started his pro baseball career in 1991 with the South Bend White Sox of the Single-A Midwest League. His minor league career in the White Sox organization (1991-1998) also included stops with the Single-A Sarasota White Sox, Double-A Birmingham Barons, Triple-A Nashville Sounds and the Triple-A Calgary Cannons. He missed most of the 1997 season because of a torn achilles tendon suffered in spring training.

In 1994, Saenz was called up the White Sox, making his major league debut at third base against the Baltimore Orioles on May 28, 1994, going 1-3 and collecting his first hit in the third inning against Ben McDonald. He had 2 hits in 14 at-bats during the five games he spent on the White Sox roster before being optioned back to Nashville.

=== Oakland Athletics ===
After being released by the White Sox following the 1998 season, Sáenz signed as a free agent with the Oakland Athletics on November 13, 1998, and made the Athletics opening day roster. He was used primarily as a designated hitter during his four seasons with Oakland, getting occasional playing time at either 1st or 3rd.

He suffered a ruptured right Achilles tendon in the 2002 American League Division Series against the Minnesota Twins and was sidelined for the remainder of the postseason and most of 2003.

=== Los Angeles Dodgers ===
A question mark because of his injury history, Sáenz was not retained by the A's and wound up attending spring training with the Los Angeles Dodgers as a non-roster invitee, earning a spot on their roster as the primary right-handed pinch hitter. He was part of Major League history when, on September 8, 2004, he hit a pinch-hit grand slam homer, marking the first time in MLB history that a team had a pinch-hit grand slam in back-to-back games, as Robin Ventura hit one on September 7. His best year came in 2005, when he set a career high in almost every offensive category including home runs (15) and RBI (63). He also had a solid 2006 season when he hit for a batting average of .296 with 11 home runs and 48 RBI.

He was one of the Dodgers' most consistent players coming off the bench during his time in Los Angeles. Sáenz became well known as being a dead fastball hitter, a skill upon which Vin Scully remarked at virtually every one of Saenz's plate appearances. He rarely played in the field, making only an occasional start at either first or third base. He earned the nickname "The Killer Tomato" from Dodger fans and commentators.

=== New York Mets ===
His tenure with the Dodgers ended when he filed for free agency on October 11, 2007. On February 12, 2008, Sáenz signed a minor league deal with the New York Mets and was invited to spring training. He failed to make the roster and retired.

== International career ==
=== World Baseball Classic ===
He played for Panama in the inaugural World Baseball Classic in 2006, and had two hits and one RBI in three games.

== Coaching career ==
He was previously the hitting coach for the Great Falls Voyagers of the Pioneer League.

== Personal life ==
Sáenz and his wife, Sylvia, have a son, Juan Carlos and daughter, Jaquelyn. He owns a ranch in his native Panama.
