= Odalis Pérez =

Dominican baseball player (1977–2022)

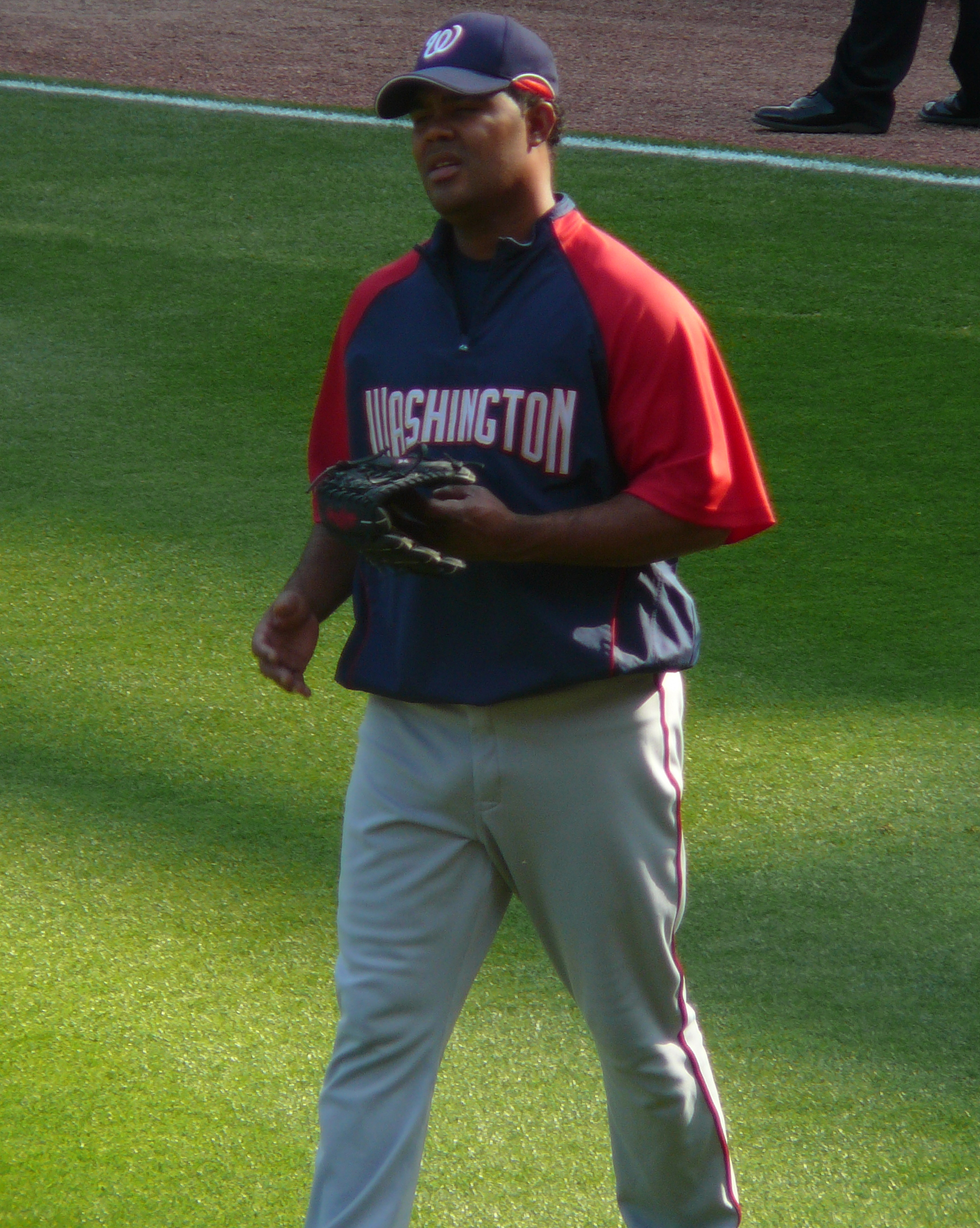
- Pérez with the Washington Nationals in 2008
- Pitcher
- Born: June 11, 1977; Las Matas de Farfán, Dominican Republic
- Died: March 10, 2022 (aged 44); Santo Domingo, Dominican Republic
- Batted: Left Threw: Left

MLB debut
- September 1, 1998, for the Atlanta Braves

Last MLB appearance
- September 28, 2008, for the Washington Nationals

MLB statistics
- Win–loss record: 73–82
- Earned run average: 4.46
- Strikeouts: 920
- Stats at Baseball Reference

Teams
- Atlanta Braves (1998–1999, 2001); Los Angeles Dodgers (2002–2006); Kansas City Royals (2006–2007); Washington Nationals (2008)

Career highlights and awards
- All-Star (2002)

Odalis Amadol Pérez (June 11, 1977 – March 10, 2022) was a Dominican professional baseball starting pitcher. He played with the Atlanta Braves (1998–2001), the Los Angeles Dodgers (2002–2006), the Kansas City Royals (2006–2007), and the Washington Nationals (2008).

== Personal life ==
Pérez was a 1995 graduate of Damian David Ortiz High School in his homeland. He had a son, Odalis Jr. Pérez, participated in community baseball clinics for the Dodgers and the Manny Mota International Foundation and also visited schools in Los Angeles area as part of the Dodger Jams program.

== Professional career ==
=== Atlanta Braves ===
Pérez joined the Braves in September 1998, going 0–1. He won a game for the Braves in the 1998 postseason, becoming the first pitcher in MLB history to earn a playoff win without having won a regular season game.

On May 2, 1999, Pérez got his first regular-season victory pitching 5.2 innings and allowing two earned runs with seven strikeouts, as Atlanta rolled to a 5–3 victory over the Cincinnati Reds.

On January 15, 2002, he was traded by the Braves with Andrew Brown and Brian Jordan to the Dodgers for Gary Sheffield.

=== Los Angeles Dodgers ===
In a two-year period from 2002-2003, he won 27 games (15 in 2002, 12 in 2003), which was tied for the third most wins by a left-handed pitcher in the National League, joining Tom Glavine behind Randy Johnson and Al Leiter, and 10th most in the majors. He was the first Dodger left-hander to register at least 12 wins in consecutive seasons since Fernando Valenzuela accomplished the feat during 1986 (21) and 1987 (14). During the same period, Pérez also had the sixth-most strikeouts (296) among all major-league lefties, ranking fourth in the National League behind Johnson, Randy Wolf and Leiter.

Also in those two seasons, Pérez allowed two earned runs or less in 33 of his 62 starts, being selected to the All-Star game in 2002 — a season in which he pitched a pair of one-hit games.

A career highlight for Pérez occurred on August 28, 2002, as he defeated the Arizona Diamondbacks at Dodger Stadium with a score of 1–0, during which he pitched 8.0 scoreless innings and slugged his first career home run for the only run of the game. With this victory, he became the first Major League pitcher to win a 1–0 game and hit the game-winning homer since the Dodgers' Bob Welch accomplished the feat on June 17, 1983. This game also marked the beginning of closer Éric Gagné's record-breaking streak, the first game of 84 consecutive saves.

Pérez had 18 no decisions in 2004, the most among MLB starting pitchers for that season.

=== Kansas City Royals ===
In 2006, concerns about Pérez's work ethic and attitude arose, and the front office soon was looking to deal the left hander, as then-GM Ned Colletti details in his memoir, The Big Chair. Shortly after a disappointing outing in a 10–8 loss in Arizona on May 2, owner Frank McCourt approached Colletti, telling him to trade Odalis. "I don't care if you've got to eat the entire contract. Get him out of here." On July 25, 2006, Perez and two minor league pitchers (Blake Johnson and Julio Pimentel) were traded to the Kansas City Royals in exchange for Elmer Dessens. Cash considerations were also sent to the Royals in the deal.

On October 31, 2007, the Royals declined Perez's $9 million option and paid him a $1.5 million buyout.

=== Washington Nationals ===
On February 19, 2008, Pérez signed a minor league contract with the Washington Nationals and was invited to spring training. Pérez had his contract purchased by the Nationals on March 20, 2008.

Perez got the Opening Day start for Washington on March 30, 2008. He gave up the first home run in the history of Nationals Park, to Chipper Jones in the top of the fourth. He allowed the one run and surrendered four hits over five innings and ended up with a no-decision. Ryan Zimmerman hit a walk-off home rune to decide the first game in the history of Nationals Park, 3–2. He also struck out the first batter and delivered the first pitch in the history of Nationals Park.

Pérez agreed to a minor league contract with the Nationals prior to the 2009 season. However, he had second thoughts and did not report to spring training, instead wanting a major league deal. He was subsequently released.

== Death ==
Pérez died after falling off a ladder at his home in Santo Domingo on March 10, 2022. He was 44. Pérez was alone at home at the time of death.

Preceded by John Patterson	Washington Nationals Opening Day; Starting Pitcher; 2008	Succeeded by John Lannan
