= Giovanni Carrara =

Venezuelan baseball player & coach (born 1968)

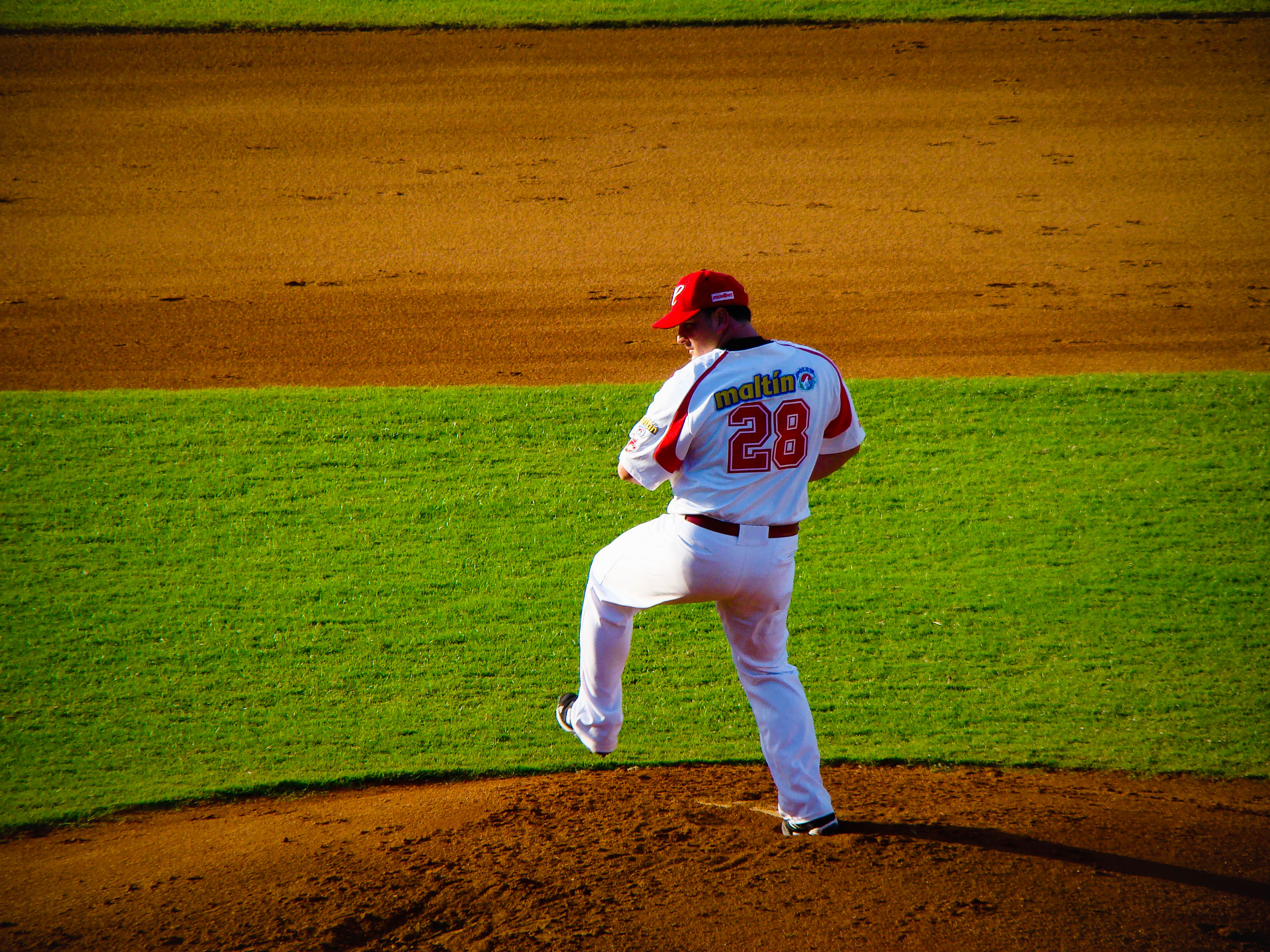
- Carrera pitching for Cardenales de Lara in 2008

Rieleros de Aguascalientes
- Pitcher / Coach
- Born: March 4, 1968 (age 58); El Tigre, Venezuela
- Batted: Right Threw: Right

Professional debut
- MLB: July 29, 1995, for the Toronto Blue Jays
- NPB: April 7, 1998, for the Seibu Lions

Last appearance
- MLB: September 23, 2006, for the Los Angeles Dodgers
- NPB: October 8, 1998, for the Seibu Lions

MLB statistics
- Win–loss record: 29–18
- Earned run average: 4.69
- Strikeouts: 338

NPB statistics
- Win–loss record: 1–2
- Earned run average: 4.91
- Strikeouts: 50
- Stats at Baseball Reference

Teams
- Toronto Blue Jays (1995–1996); Cincinnati Reds (1996–1997); Seibu Lions (1998); Colorado Rockies (2000); Los Angeles Dodgers (2001–2002); Seattle Mariners (2003); Los Angeles Dodgers (2004–2006)

Member of the Venezuelan

Baseball Hall of Fame
- Induction: 2017
- Vote: 75%
- Election method: Contemporary Committee

Giovanni Carrara Jiménez (born March 4, 1968) is a Venezuelan-Italian former professional baseball pitcher who most recently served as the pitching coach for the Saraperos de Saltillo of the Mexican League. He played in Major League Baseball (MLB) for the Toronto Blue Jays, Cincinnati Reds, Colorado Rockies, Los Angeles Dodgers, and Seattle Mariners, and in Nippon Professional Baseball (NPB) for the Seibu Lions.

== Playing career ==
Carrera initially struggled as a starting pitcher in the major leagues but later became an effective long reliever. He had a 90–92 MPH fastball, along with a couple of breaking balls, a deceptive slow curve, and particularly his off-speed pitch; a hard one that was somewhere between a slider and cut fastball. He controlled the running game as well, with a good move to both first base and second, and a quick delivery to the plate.

On August 15, 2001, Carrara combined with fellow Venezuelan pitchers Omar Daal, Kelvim Escobar, and Freddy García to win their respective starts: Carrara, of the Dodgers, facing Montreal, 13–1; Daal, in a Phillies victory over the Brewers, 8–6; Escobar, of the Blue Jays, over Oakland, 5–2, and García, of Seattle, against the Red Sox, 6–2. This marked the first time in major league history that four pitchers coming from Venezuela recorded a winning game in their respective starts on the same day.

On August 26, 2006, Carrara was designated for assignment by the Dodgers. He was called up in September 2006 when rosters expanded and used sparingly after re-joining the big league club. The Dodgers chose not to re-sign Carrara in the offseason.

On May 4, 2007, Carrara was signed by the Caffè Danesi Nettuno of Serie A1 in Italy. In 2008, he was 8–2 with a 2.35 ERA and 49 strikeouts.

== Coaching career ==
Prior to the 2021 season, Carrara was hired to serve as the pitching coach for the Single-A affiliate of the St. Louis Cardinals, the Palm Beach Cardinals. He served in the role through the 2024 season.

On December 6, 2024, Carrara was hired as pitching coach for the Saraperos de Saltillo of the Mexican League. On January 6, 2026, Vicente Palacios was hired as Saltillo's pitching coach, replacing Carrara.

In March 2026, Carrara joined the Rieleros de Aguascalientes of the Mexican League as their pitching coach.

== See also ==
- List of Major League Baseball players from Venezuela
