= César Izturis =

Venezuelan baseball player (born 1980)

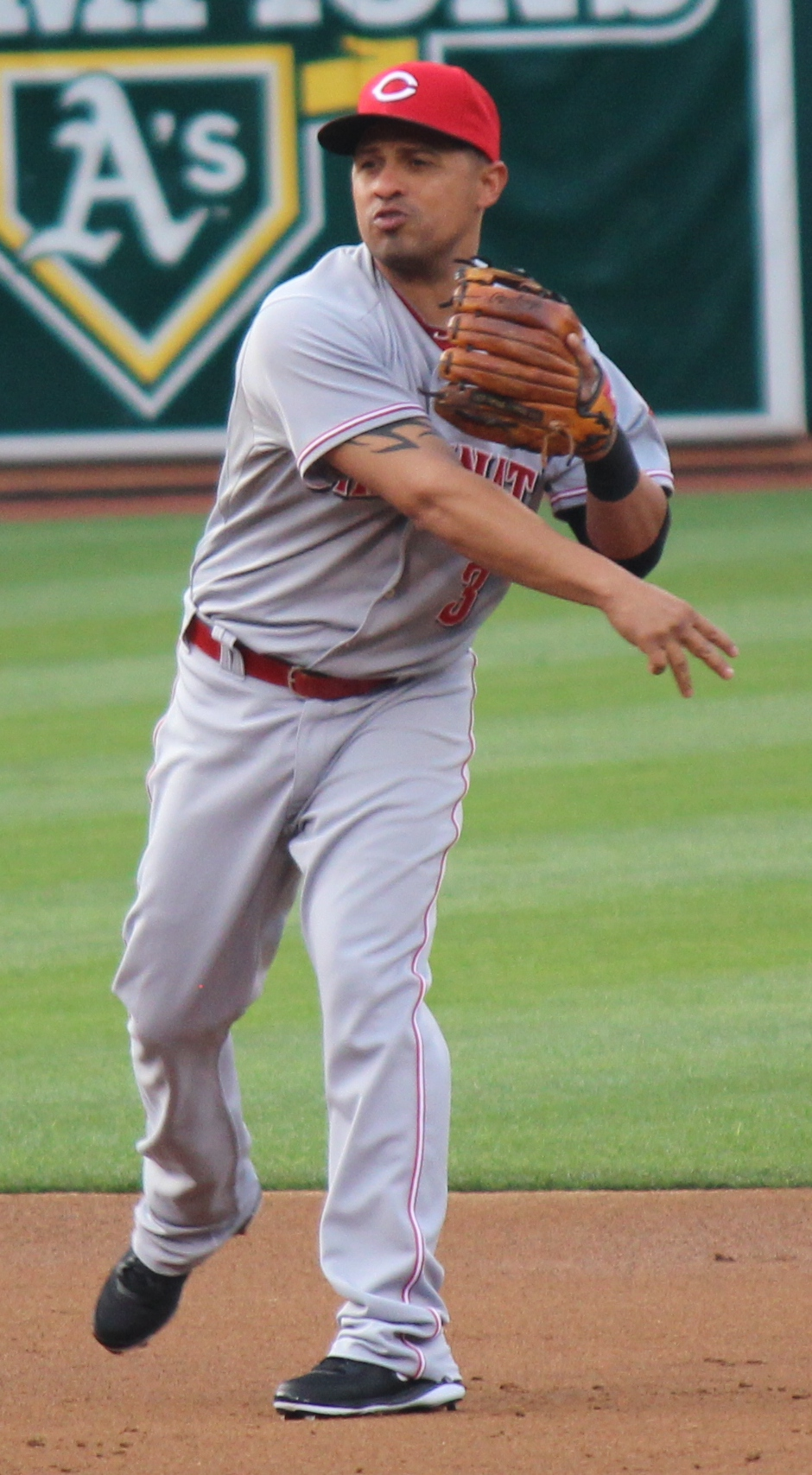
- Izturis with the Cincinnati Reds in 2013

Toros de Tijuana
- Shortstop / Coach
- Born: February 10, 1980 (age 46); Barquisimeto, Venezuela
- Batted: Switch Threw: Right

MLB debut
- June 23, 2001, for the Toronto Blue Jays

Last MLB appearance
- September 29, 2013, for the Cincinnati Reds

MLB statistics
- Batting average: .254
- Home runs: 17
- Runs batted in: 312
- Stats at Baseball Reference

Teams
- Toronto Blue Jays (2001); Los Angeles Dodgers (2002–2006); Chicago Cubs (2006–2007); Pittsburgh Pirates (2007); St. Louis Cardinals (2008); Baltimore Orioles (2009–2011); Milwaukee Brewers (2012); Washington Nationals (2012); Cincinnati Reds (2013)

Career highlights and awards
- All-Star (2005); Gold Glove Award (2004)

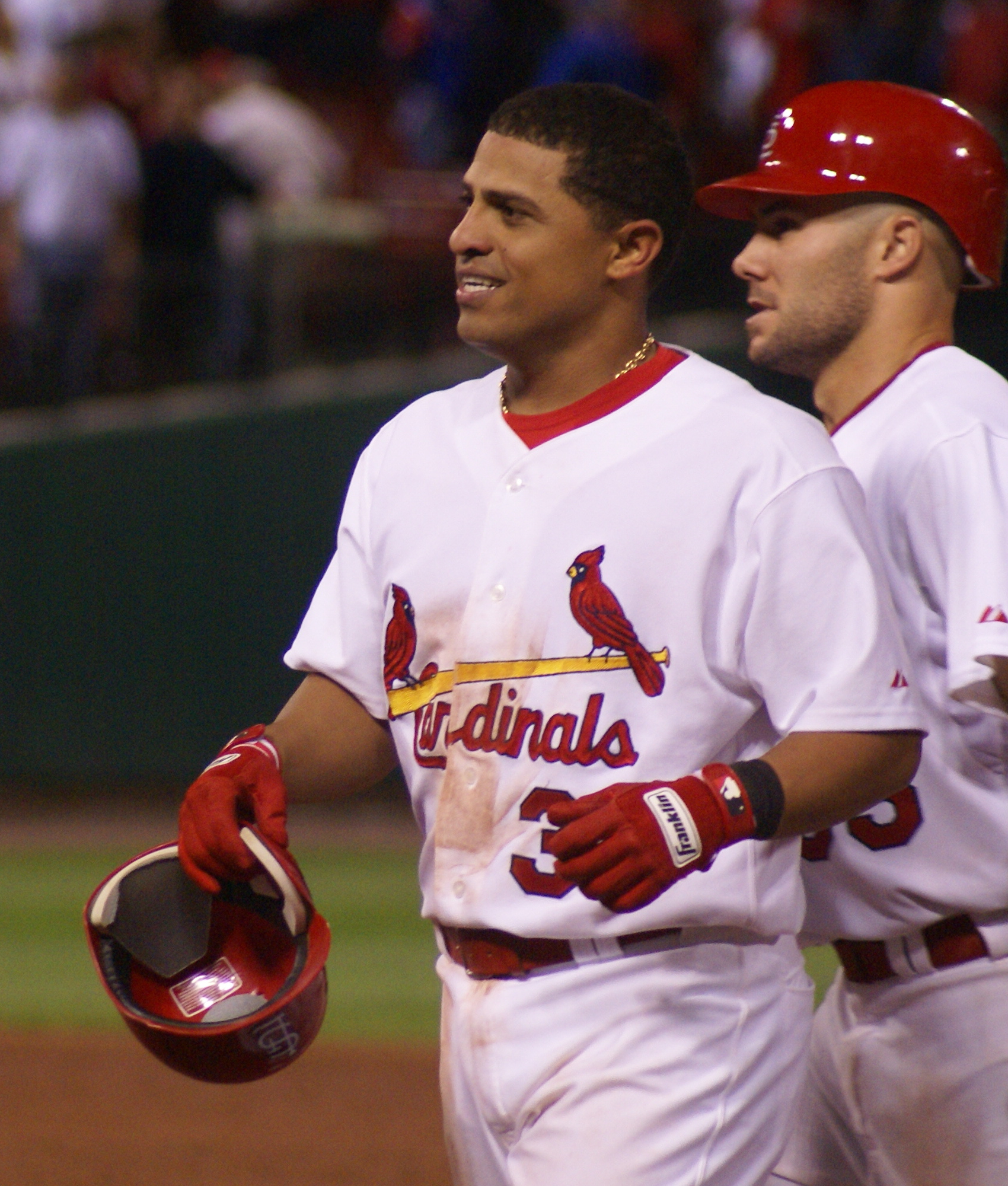
Izturis with the St. Louis Cardinals on September 9, 2008.

César David Izturis (/ɪsˈtʊərɪs/; born February 10, 1980) is a Venezuelan former professional baseball shortstop who currently serves as the bench coach for the Toros de Tijuana of the Mexican League. He played 13 seasons in Major League Baseball (MLB) for the Toronto Blue Jays, Los Angeles Dodgers, Chicago Cubs, Pittsburgh Pirates, St. Louis Cardinals, Baltimore Orioles, Milwaukee Brewers, Washington Nationals, and Cincinnati Reds. He is the half-brother of shortstop Maicer Izturis.

== Playing career ==
=== Toronto Blue Jays ===
Signed by the Toronto Blue Jays as an amateur free agent in 1996, Izturis made his debut with Toronto in 2001 and had a .269 average.

=== Los Angeles Dodgers ===
During the Winter Meetings after the 2001 season, the Blue Jays traded Izturis and Paul Quantrill to the Los Angeles Dodgers for Luke Prokopec and Chad Ricketts. Izturis started at shortstop from Opening Day of the 2002 season, and he quickly established himself in the Dodgers' infield. But he showed no patience at the plate, resulting in a decline in average and very few walks. After two years of barely adequate hitting (though compensated by his stellar glovework), he improved markedly in 2004, when he hit .288 with 62 RBI and 25 stolen bases in 159 games. At the end of the season, he earned his first Gold Glove, the first by a Dodger shortstop since Maury Wills' back-to-back honors in 1961 and 1962.

In 2005, Izturis hit .348 through June 1 and led the entire majors in hits. He was selected for the National League All-Star team, but his batting average later dipped all the way down into the .250 range. Curiously, his defense also seemed to suffer. After two trips to the disabled list, Izturis underwent Tommy John surgery in his right elbow, and returned in mid-June 2006.

With the uncertainty around Izturis, the Dodgers acquired shortstop Rafael Furcal in the off-season. That move seemed to have put Izturis' future with the Dodgers in doubt. With a $13 million annual salary, Furcal did not seem a likely candidate to be benched.

=== Chicago Cubs ===
On July 31, 2006, at the trade deadline, the Dodgers traded Izturis to the Chicago Cubs in exchange for Greg Maddux and cash considerations. In 22 games for the Cubs down the stretch, he batted .233/.282/.260 with no home runs and six RBI.

Izturis made 65 appearances for Chicago to begin the 2007 season, slashing .246/.298/.304 with no home runs, eight RBI, and three stolen bases.

=== Pittsburgh Pirates ===
On July 19, 2007, Izturis and cash were traded to the Pittsburgh Pirates in exchange for a player to be named later. In 45 appearances for Pittsburgh, he batted .276/.310/.333 with no home runs and eight RBI. On November 16, the Pirates declined an option on Izturis, and he became a free agent.

=== St. Louis Cardinals ===
On November 30, 2007, Izturis signed a one-year, $2.85 million contract with the St. Louis Cardinals. Izturis made 135 appearances for St. Louis during the 2008 campaign, hitting .263/.319/.309 with one home run, 24 RBI, and 24 stolen bases.

=== Baltimore Orioles ===
On December 16, 2008, Izturis signed a two-year, major league contract with the Baltimore Orioles. In 2009, he led all starting shortstops in range factor, at 4.89. Izturis made 114 appearances for Baltimore during the year, slashing .256/.294/.328 with two home runs, 30 RBI, and 12 stolen bases. In 150 appearances for the Orioles during the 2010 season, Izturis batted .230/.277/.269 with one home run, 28 RBI, and 11 stolen bases.

On December 10, 2010, Izturis re-signed with the Orioles on a one-year, $1.5 million contract. He played in 18 games for Baltimore in 2011, 6-for-30 (.200) with 1 RBI and 2 walks. Izturis missed a chunk of the season after undergoing surgery to repair an ulnar nerve injury. On August 11, 2011, he was placed on the disabled list with a left groin strain, and missed the remainder of the season.

=== Milwaukee Brewers ===
On December 21, 2011, Izturis signed a minor league contract with the Milwaukee Brewers organization that included an invitation to spring training. On March 29, 2012, it was announced that Izturis had made Milwaukee's Opening Day roster, with his contract being formally selected on April 1. In 57 appearances for the Brewers, he slashed .235/.249/.333 with two home runs and 11 RBI.

=== Washington Nationals ===
On August 6, 2012, Izturis was claimed off waivers by the Washington Nationals. In 5 games for Washington, he went 2-for-4 (.500). Izturis was designated for assignment by the Nationals on August 17, only 11 days after arriving in Washington. He elected free agency on August 20.

=== Cincinnati Reds ===
On January 14, 2013, the Cincinnati Reds announced that they had signed Izturis to a minor league contract that included an invitation to spring training. On March 31, the Reds selected Izturis' contract after he made the team's Opening Day roster. In 63 appearances for Cincinnati, he batted .209/.259/.271 with no home runs and 11 RBI.

=== Houston Astros ===
On January 13, 2014, Izturis signed a minor league contract with the Houston Astros. On March 24, after being informed he would not make the team, Izturis opted out of his contract and was released by the Astros organization. On April 19, it was reported that Izturis had turned down minor league offers in hopes of landing a major league contract.

== Coaching career ==
On February 11, 2025, Izturis was announced as the bench coach for the Toros de Tijuana of the Mexican League.

Izturis was named manager of the Cardenales de Lara of the Venezuelan Professional Baseball League for the 2025–26 season, replacing Henry Blanco. After the season, he was named manager of the Navegantes del Magallanes for the 2026 Serie de las Américas, held in Caracas; he led the team to its first SDLA championship.

== Personal life ==
Izturis resides in Barquisimeto, Venezuela, with his wife Liliana and their two children; his son Cesar Daniel (born November 11, 1999) and daughter Daniella (born July 17, 2006). In 2016, Cesar Daniel signed with the Seattle Mariners as an international free agent. Cesar Daniel is a Venezuelan professional baseball infielder for El Águila de Veracruz of the Mexican League.

== See also ==
- List of Gold Glove Award winners at shortstop
- List of Major League Baseball players from Venezuela
