= Scott Little =

American baseball player & coach (born 1963)

- Outfielder
- Born: January 19, 1963 (age 63); East St. Louis, Illinois
- Batted: Right Threw: Right

MLB debut
- July 27, 1989, for the Pittsburgh Pirates

Last MLB appearance
- August 6, 1989, for the Pittsburgh Pirates

MLB statistics
- Batting average: .250
- At bats: 4
- Hits: 1
- Stats at Baseball Reference

Teams
- Pittsburgh Pirates (1989)

Dennis Scott Little (born January 19, 1963) is an American former professional baseball outfielder. He played three games in Major League Baseball (MLB) for the Pittsburgh Pirates. He currently works for the Colorado Rockies in the Player Development Department.

== Career ==
Little, an outfielder, played collegiate football and baseball at the University of Missouri. He played in the 1981 Tangerine Bowl and was drafted by the New York Mets in the 7th round of the 1984 Major League Baseball draft, playing three seasons in their minor league organization. On May 29, 1987, Little was traded, along with Al Pedrique, to the Pittsburgh Pirates, in exchange for Bill Almon. He played for the Pirates in three games in 1989, then played in the minors again until 1991. He batted and threw right-handed, stood 6'0" tall and weighed 198 lbs.

Since his playing career, Little managed extensively in minor league baseball, beginning in 1992 with the Augusta Pirates of the South Atlantic League. He has managed in the farm systems of the Pirates, Dodgers, Washington Nationals, and Texas Rangers In addition, he spent 2009-2015 as an Area Scout with the Los Angeles Dodgers.
