= Yhency Brazobán =

Dominican baseball player (born 1980)

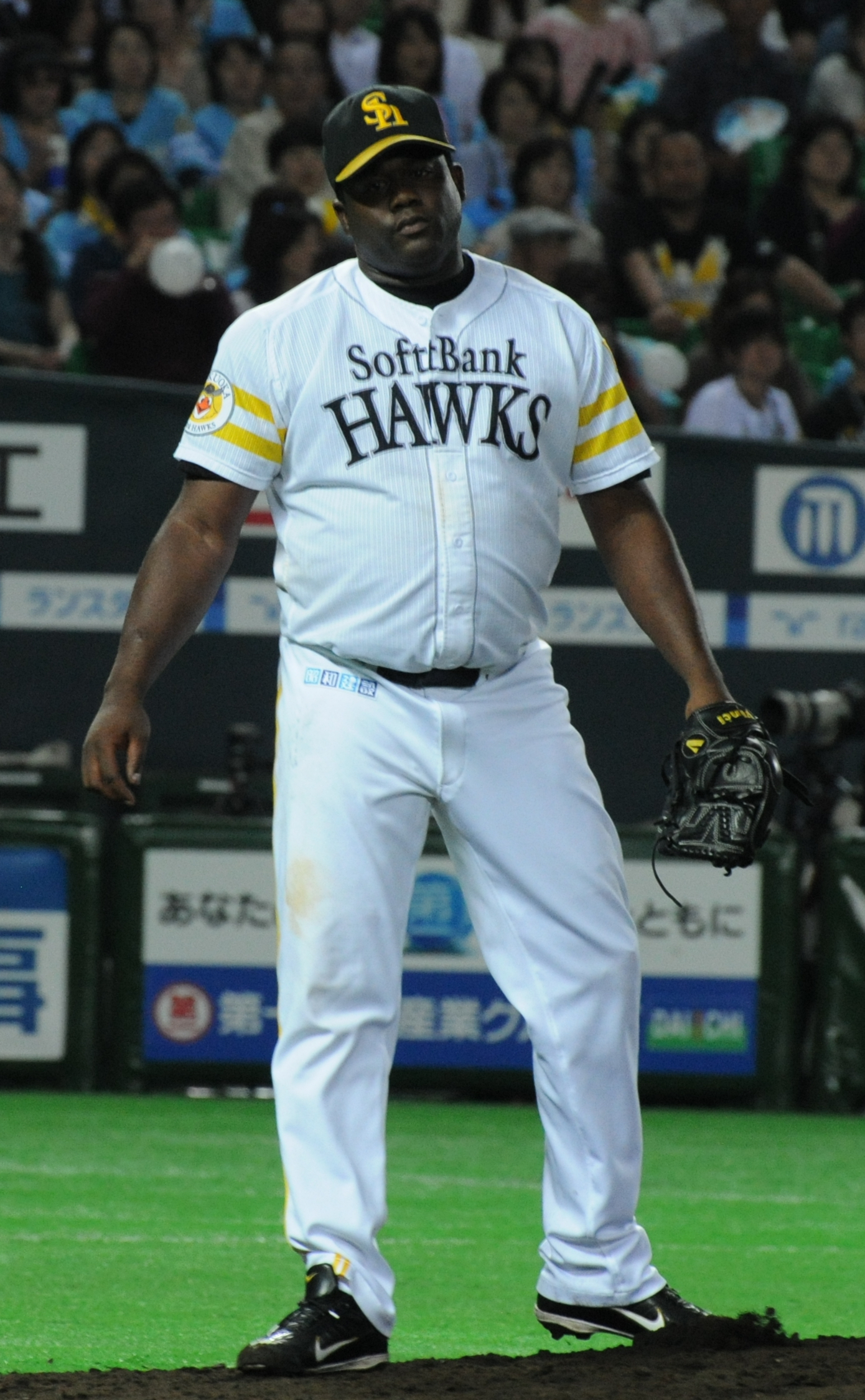
- Brazobán with the Fukuoka SoftBank Hawks
- Pitcher
- Born: 11 June 1980 (age 45); Santo Domingo, Dominican Republic
- Batted: Right Threw: Right

Professional debut
- MLB: 5 August, 2004, for the Los Angeles Dodgers
- NPB: 21 August, 2011, for the Fukuoka SoftBank Hawks

Last appearance
- MLB: 19 July, 2011, for the Arizona Diamondbacks
- NPB: 16 October, 2011, for the Fukuoka SoftBank Hawks

MLB statistics
- Win–loss record: 10–12
- Earned run average: 4.76
- Strikeouts: 108
- Saves: 21

NPB statistics
- Win–loss record: 0–0
- Earned run average: 0.56
- Strikeouts: 12
- Stats at Baseball Reference

Teams
- Los Angeles Dodgers (2004–2008); Arizona Diamondbacks (2011); Fukuoka SoftBank Hawks (2011)

Career highlights and awards
- Japan Series champion (2011)

Yhency José Brazobán (born 11 June 1980) is a Dominican former professional baseball pitcher. He pitched in Major League Baseball for the Los Angeles Dodgers and Arizona Diamondbacks and in Nippon Professional Baseball for the Fukuoka SoftBank Hawks. He throws and bats right-handed.

== Professional career ==
=== New York Yankees ===
Brazobán was signed as an undrafted free agent by the New York Yankees on 10 July 1997, and proceeded to hit .319 as an outfielder for the Yankees Dominican Summer League, earning a spot on the Dominican League All-Star Team.

In 1999–2000 he made the Gulf Coast League All-Star team, hitting .320 and .303, earning a promotion to Single-A Greensboro in 2000 and playing there through 2002.

The Yankees converted Brazobán from an outfielder to a pitcher in 2003, sending him to three different minor league levels to work on his pitching: the Gulf Coast Yankees, Tampa Yankees and Trenton Thunder. Combined he was 2–4 with 18 saves in 47 relief appearances.

=== Los Angeles Dodgers ===
He was acquired by the Los Angeles Dodgers from the Yankees on 13 December 2003, along with Jeff Weaver and Brandon Weeden in exchange for right-hander Kevin Brown. He earned a call-up to the Dodgers in 2004 after a sensational year at Class AA Jacksonville and Class AAA Las Vegas.

Brazobán made his major league debut with the Los Angeles Dodgers on 5 August 2004, working one scoreless inning of relief against the Pittsburgh Pirates.

Primarily a setup man for Éric Gagné during the 2004 season, he became the Dodgers closer for a brief time in 2005 after Gagné was lost for the season with an injury. He established new Dodgers rookie records by appearing in 75 games and recording 21 saves.

Brazoban entered the 2006 season as a member of a strong Dodgers bullpen. He and Danys Báez, who was acquired for the 2006 season but was later traded, were slotted to work as setup men for closer Éric Gagné. However, early in the year Brazoban went on the disabled list with an elbow injury that cost him the entire season. He underwent Tommy John surgery to repair a torn ligament in his right elbow.

He worked his way back from the injury to rejoin the Dodgers' bullpen in May 2007, but after a few appearances he suffered another serious arm injury and was lost for the rest of the 2007 season. After two serious injuries in a row, he opened the 2008 season in the minors with the Jacksonville Suns. He pitched well enough in the minors to earn a return to the Dodgers bullpen, and the Dodgers called him up on 9 May. He appeared in two games with the Dodgers in 2008, allowing two earned runs in three innings while striking out three batters and walking three, before the Dodgers again optioned him to Las Vegas. On 19 July, the Dodgers placed him on the disabled list for the rest of the season with another shoulder injury. He was released after the season but eventually re-signed to a minor league contract with an invitation to spring training. However, he was released again on 19 March 2009.

=== Mexican League / New York Mets ===
Brazoban began the 2010 season in the Mexican League, where he was 4–3 with a 2.22 ERA in 52 relief appearances for Minatitlan and Mexico City. On 15 August 2010, he was signed to a minor league deal with the New York Mets, and was assigned to Triple-A Buffalo. He was in 10 games with Buffalo, with a 6.10 ERA.

=== Texas Rangers ===
On 16 December 2010, he was signed to a minor league contract with the Texas Rangers. He played in 16 games with the Round Rock Express and was released on 2 June 2011, with a 3.42 ERA.

=== Arizona Diamondbacks ===
Later that day, he signed a minor league contract with the Arizona Diamondbacks and was assigned to the Triple-A Reno Aces. After 8 games with the Aces, he had his contract purchased on 28 June. He was outrighted to the minors on 20 July.

=== Fukuoka SoftBank Hawks ===
Brazoban was sold to the Fukuoka SoftBank Hawks in Japan on 29 July 2011.

=== Vaqueros Laguna ===
On 14 March 2012, Brazoban signed with the Vaqueros Laguna of the Mexican Baseball League. He was released on 22 June.

=== Rojos del Águila de Veracruz ===
On 27 June 2012, Brazoban signed with the Rojos del Águila de Veracruz of the Mexican Baseball League. He was released on 29 June.

=== Grand Prairie AirHogs ===
Brazoban signed with the Grand Prairie AirHogs of the American Association of Independent Professional Baseball and played for them during the 2014 season.
