= Jason Grabowski =

American baseball player (born 1976)

- Left fielder
- Born: May 24, 1976 (age 50); New Haven, Connecticut, U.S.
- Batted: Left Threw: Right

MLB debut
- September 22, 2002, for the Oakland Athletics

Last MLB appearance
- October 2, 2005, for the Los Angeles Dodgers

MLB statistics
- Batting average: .196
- Home runs: 11
- Runs batted in: 33
- Stats at Baseball Reference

Teams
- Oakland Athletics (2002–2003); Los Angeles Dodgers (2004–2005); Orix Buffaloes (2006)

Jason William Grabowski (born May 24, 1976) is an American former Major League Baseball (MLB) outfielder who played for the Oakland Athletics and Los Angeles Dodgers from 2002 to 2005.

== Amateur career ==
Grabowski graduated from The Morgan School in Clinton, Connecticut in 1994. He was drafted by the New York Yankees in the 17th round of the 1994 MLB draft but did not sign and went to play college baseball at the University of Connecticut. In 1995 and 1996, Grabowski played collegiate summer baseball with the Chatham A's of the Cape Cod Baseball League. He was then drafted by the Texas Rangers in the second round of the 1997 MLB draft.

== Professional career ==
The Seattle Mariners selected Grabowski off waivers from the Rangers on December 18, 2000, and he was drafted by the Oakland Athletics in the Rule 5 draft on December 13, 2001.

Grabowski made his Major League debut for the Athletics on September 22, 2002, against the Rangers, with one strikeout and one walk in his two plate appearances. His first hit was a double to right field off Chan Ho Park of the Rangers on September 27. Grabowski played in a total of 12 games for the Athletics between the 2002 and 2003 seasons and had three hits in 16 at-bats.

On March 29, 2004, Grabowski was sold to the Los Angeles Dodgers. He spent the entire season with the Dodgers, as their primary left-handed pinch hitter. Grabowski hit his first Major League home run, off Kerry Wood of the Chicago Cubs, on May 11, 2004. In 113 games with the Dodgers that season, he hit .220 with 7 homers and 20 RBI. Grabowski split 2005 between the Dodgers and the AAA Las Vegas 51s. With the Dodgers, Grabowski appeared in 65 games, compiling a .161 batting average, 4 homers and 12 RBI. In Las Vegas, Grabowski played in 52 games and hit .292 with 6 homers and 33 RBI.

In the 2005 offseason, Grabowski's contract was sold to the Orix Buffaloes of Japan's Pacific League. He hit .146 in 39 games for the Buffaloes.

Grabowski was a 2007 non-roster invitee to the Tampa Bay Devil Rays spring training, but did not make the team and was reassigned to the minors. He was released on April 23, 2007, without appearing in any games in the Devil Rays system.
