= Antonio Pérez (baseball) =

Dominican baseball player (born 1980)

- Infielder
- Born: January 26, 1980 (age 46); Bani, Dominican Republic
- Batted: Right Threw: Right

MLB debut
- May 14, 2003, for the Tampa Bay Devil Rays

Last MLB appearance
- September 28, 2006, for the Oakland Athletics

MLB statistics
- Batting average: .244
- Home runs: 6
- Runs batted in: 43
- Stats at Baseball Reference

Teams
- Tampa Bay Devil Rays (2003); Los Angeles Dodgers (2004–2005); Oakland Athletics (2006)

Antonio Miguel Pérez (born January 26, 1980) is a Dominican former Major League Baseball player. In 2005, he led the Los Angeles Dodgers with 11 stolen bases. Pérez signed a minor league contract with the Washington Nationals for the 2008 season, but was released during spring training. In March 2009, he signed a minor league contract with the Atlanta Braves.

While a minor leaguer, Pérez was involved in two major trades. He went from the Cincinnati Reds to the Seattle Mariners in the Ken Griffey Jr. trade in 2000, and was later sent to the Tampa Bay Devil Rays for Randy Winn. Also, in 2005, he was sent to the Oakland A's for Andre Ethier.
