= 2004 Colorado Rockies season =

2004 Colorado Rockies
- League: National League
- Division: West
- Ballpark: Coors Field
- City: Denver, Colorado
- Record: 68–94 (.420)
- Divisional place: 4th
- Owner: Jerry McMorris
- General manager: Dan O'Dowd
- Manager: Clint Hurdle
- Television: KTVD; Fox Sports Rocky Mountain (George Frazier, Drew Goodman)
- Radio: KOA (AM) (Jack Corrigan, Jeff Kingery)
- Stats: ESPN.com; Baseball Reference

The 2004 Colorado Rockies season was their 12th in Major League Baseball and 10th season at Coors Field. Clint Hurdle was the manager. They finished with a record of 68–94, fourth in the National League West, and missed the postseason for the ninth consecutive season.

== Offseason ==
- December 2, 2003: Juan Uribe was traded by Colorado to the Chicago White Sox for Aaron Miles.
- December 11, 2003: Vinny Castilla signed as a free agent.
- December 14, 2003: Justin Speier was traded by the Rockies as part of a three-team deal to the Toronto Blue Jays for a player to be named later from Toronto and Joe Kennedy from the Tampa Bay Devil Rays. The Blue Jays sent minor leaguer Sandy Nin to the Rockies on December 15 to complete the trade.
- January 9, 2004: Jeromy Burnitz and Royce Clayton signed as free agents.
- March 8, 2004: Shawn Estes signed as a free agent.

== Regular season ==
=== Season standings ===
==== National League West ====
NL West
| Team | W | L | Pct. | GB | Home | Road |
|---|---|---|---|---|---|---|
| Los Angeles Dodgers | 93 | 69 | .574 | — | 49‍–‍32 | 44‍–‍37 |
| San Francisco Giants | 91 | 71 | .562 | 2 | 47‍–‍35 | 44‍–‍36 |
| San Diego Padres | 87 | 75 | .537 | 6 | 42‍–‍39 | 45‍–‍36 |
| Colorado Rockies | 68 | 94 | .420 | 25 | 38‍–‍43 | 30‍–‍51 |
| Arizona Diamondbacks | 51 | 111 | .315 | 42 | 29‍–‍52 | 22‍–‍59 |

==== Record vs. opponents ====
2004 National League record Source: MLB Standings Grid – 2004
| Team | AZ | ATL | CHC | CIN | COL | FLA | HOU | LAD | MIL | MON | NYM | PHI | PIT | SD | SF | STL | AL |
|---|---|---|---|---|---|---|---|---|---|---|---|---|---|---|---|---|---|
| Arizona | — | 2–4 | 4–2 | 3–3 | 6–13 | 3–4 | 2–4 | 3–16 | 3–3 | 0–6 | 3–4 | 1–5 | 2–4 | 7–12 | 5–14 | 1–5 | 6–12 |
| Atlanta | 4–2 | — | 3–3 | 2–4 | 4–2 | 14–5 | 3–3 | 4–3 | 4–2 | 15–4 | 12–7 | 10–9 | 4–2 | 3–3 | 4–3 | 2–4 | 8–10 |
| Chicago | 2–4 | 3–3 | — | 9–8 | 5–1 | 3–3 | 10–9 | 2–4 | 10–7 | 3–3 | 4–2 | 3–3 | 13–5 | 4–2 | 2–4 | 8–11 | 8–4 |
| Cincinnati | 3–3 | 4–2 | 8–9 | — | 3–3 | 4–2 | 6–11 | 4–2 | 10–8 | 4–2 | 3–3 | 3–3 | 9–10 | 2–4 | 3–3 | 5–14 | 5-7 |
| Colorado | 13–6 | 2–4 | 1–5 | 3–3 | — | 1–5 | 1–5 | 8–11 | 2–4 | 2–4 | 1–5 | 5–3 | 2–4 | 10–9 | 8–11 | 1–5 | 8–10 |
| Florida | 4–3 | 5–14 | 3–3 | 2–4 | 5–1 | — | 3–3 | 3–3 | 4–2 | 11–8 | 15–4 | 12–7 | 1–5 | 4–2 | 2–5 | 2–4 | 7–11 |
| Houston | 4–2 | 3–3 | 9–10 | 11–6 | 5–1 | 3-3 | — | 1–5 | 13–6 | 2–4 | 2–4 | 6–0 | 12–5 | 2–4 | 2–4 | 10–8 | 7–5 |
| Los Angeles | 16–3 | 3–4 | 4–2 | 2–4 | 11–8 | 3–3 | 5–1 | — | 3–3 | 4–3 | 3–3 | 1–5 | 6–0 | 10–9 | 10–9 | 2–4 | 10–8 |
| Milwaukee | 3–3 | 2–4 | 7–10 | 8–10 | 4–2 | 2–4 | 6–13 | 3–3 | — | 5–1 | 2–4 | 0–6 | 6–12 | 2–4 | 1–5 | 8–9 | 8–4 |
| Montreal | 6–0 | 4–15 | 3–3 | 2–4 | 4–2 | 8-11 | 4–2 | 3–4 | 1–5 | — | 9–10 | 7–12 | 4–2 | 1–6 | 1–5 | 3–3 | 7–11 |
| New York | 4–3 | 7–12 | 2–4 | 3–3 | 5–1 | 4–15 | 4–2 | 3–3 | 4–2 | 10–9 | — | 8–11 | 1–5 | 1–6 | 4–2 | 1–5 | 10–8 |
| Philadelphia | 5-1 | 9–10 | 3–3 | 3–3 | 3–5 | 7–12 | 0–6 | 5–1 | 6–0 | 12–7 | 11–8 | — | 3–3 | 5–1 | 2–4 | 3–3 | 9–9 |
| Pittsburgh | 4–2 | 2–4 | 5–13 | 10–9 | 4–2 | 5–1 | 5–12 | 0–6 | 12–6 | 2–4 | 5–1 | 3–3 | — | 3–3 | 5–1 | 5–12 | 2–10 |
| San Diego | 12–7 | 3–3 | 2–4 | 4–2 | 9–10 | 2–4 | 4–2 | 9–10 | 4–2 | 6–1 | 6–1 | 1–5 | 3–3 | — | 12–7 | 2–4 | 8–10 |
| San Francisco | 14–5 | 3–4 | 4–2 | 3–3 | 11–8 | 5–2 | 4–2 | 9–10 | 5–1 | 5–1 | 2–4 | 4–2 | 1–5 | 7–12 | — | 3–3 | 11–7 |
| St. Louis | 5–1 | 4–2 | 11–8 | 14–5 | 5–1 | 4-2 | 8–10 | 4–2 | 9–8 | 3–3 | 5–1 | 3–3 | 12–5 | 4–2 | 3–3 | — | 11–1 |

=== Summary ===
Having missed the first 68 games of the season due to a groin injury, right fielder Larry Walker's first three home runs of the season came on June 25 against Cleveland. The last was off José Jiménez, which won the game for the Rockies in the 10th inning for a 10−8 margin. Walker totaled four hits and five runs batted in (RBI) on the day, and it was his third career three-home run game.

Walker reached 2,000 career hits on June 30 becoming the 234th player in major league history to do so. Having already achieved 400 doubles, 300 home runs, 1,000 runs scored, and 1,000 RBI, he became the 40th player to reach all five totals. The milestone hit was a double off Ben Sheets in the fourth inning versus the Milwaukee Brewers. Through that point, Walker was the Rockies' career leader in 12 categories.

=== In-season transactions ===
- July 22: Jamey Wright was signed as a free agent.
- August 6: Traded right fielder Larry Walker to the St. Louis Cardinals for players to be named later and Jason Burch. On August 11, the Cardinals sent Luis Martinez and Chris Narveson to the Rockies to complete the trade.
- September 27, 2004: Jhoulys Chacín was signed as an amateur free agent.

=== Major League debuts ===
- Batters:
  - Luis González (Apr 6)
  - Matt Holliday (Apr 16)
  - Brad Hawpe (May 4)
  - Choo Freeman (Jun 4)
  - J.D. Closser (Jun 30)
  - Jorge Piedra (Aug 7)
- Pitchers:
  - Scott Dohmann (May 15)
  - Allan Simpson (May 17)
  - Chris Gissell (Aug 22)
  - Jeff Francis (Aug 25)

=== Roster ===
2004 Colorado Rockies
Roster
| Pitchers: 43 Adam Bernero; 34 Shawn Chacón; 28 Aaron Cook; 47 Scott Dohmann; 50 Travis Driskill; 50 Scott Elarton; 55 Shawn Estes; 13 Jeff Fassero; 26 Jeff Francis; 40 Brian Fuentes; 59 Chris Gissell; 46 Tim Harikkala; 38 Kevin Jarvis; 32 Jason Jennings; 37 Joe Kennedy; 48 Marc Kroon; 45 Javier López; 24 Vladimir Núñez; 39 Steve Reed; 51 Allan Simpson; 41 Denny Stark; 71 Chin-hui Tsao; 99 Turk Wendell; 16 Jamey Wright; 49 Jason Young | Catchers: 30 J.D. Closser; 20 Todd Greene; 23 Charles Johnson; Infielders: 27 Garrett Atkins; 12 Clint Barmes; 9 Vinny Castilla; 10 Royce Clayton; 4 Luis González; 17 Todd Helton; 6 Aaron Miles; 18 Andy Tracy | Outfielders: 35 Jeromy Burnitz; 21 Choo Freeman; 11 Brad Hawpe; 16 Denny Hocking; 5 Matt Holliday; 19 Kit Pellow; 3 Jorge Piedra; 7 René Reyes; 25 Mark Sweeney; 33 Larry Walker; 44 Preston Wilson | Manager: 31 Clint Hurdle; Coaches: 2 Sandy Alomar Sr. (third base); 36 Bob Apodaca (pitching); 29 Dave Collins (first base); 52 Duane Espy (hitting); 53 Rick Mathews (bullpen); 8 Jamie Quirk (bench); 56 Mark Strittmatter (bullpen catcher) |

=== Game log ===
2004 Game Log
April (9-12)

| # | Date | Opponent | Score | Win | Loss | Save | Attendance | Record |
|---|---|---|---|---|---|---|---|---|
| 1 | April 6 | @ Diamondbacks | 6–2 | Estes (1–0) | Johnson (0–1) | | 46,949 | 1–0 |
| 2 | April 7 | @ Diamondbacks | 9–4 | Webb (1–0) | Jennings (0–1) | Mantei (1) | 25,918 | 1–1 |
| 3 | April 8 | @ Diamondbacks | 6–5 (11) | Randolph (1–0) | Chacón (0–1) | | 26,448 | 1–2 |
| 4 | April 9 | @ Dodgers | 5–1 | Ishii (1–0) | Elarton (0–1) | Álvarez (1) | 54,599 | 1–3 |
| 5 | April 10 | @ Dodgers | 7–4 | Nomo (1–1) | Stark (0–1) | Gagné (1) | 35,318 | 1–4 |
| 6 | April 11 | @ Dodgers | 4–2 | Estes (2–0) | Pérez (0–1) | Chacón (1) | 27,076 | 2–4 |
| 7 | April 12 | Diamondbacks | 7–4 | Núñez (1–0) | Koplove (0–1) | Chacón (2) | 48,013 | 3–4 |
| 8 | April 14 | Diamondbacks | 14–4 | Kennedy (1–0) | Dessens (0–1) | | 23,128 | 4–4 |
| 9 | April 15 | Diamondbacks | 11–10 | Koplove (1–1) | Elarton (0–2) | Mantei (2) | 22,320 | 4–5 |
| 10 | April 16 | @ Cardinals | 13–5 | Morris (2–1) | Stark (0–2) | | 34,541 | 4–6 |
| 11 | April 17 | @ Cardinals | 8–4 | Marquis (1–1) | Estes (2–1) | | 46,471 | 4–7 |
| 12 | April 18 | @ Cardinals | 8–5 | Jennings (1–1) | Williams (0–1) | Chacón (3) | 34,697 | 5–7 |
| 13 | April 20 | Dodgers | 7–1 | Kennedy (2–0) | Ishii (2–1) | | 22,169 | 6–7 |
| 14 | April 21 | Dodgers | 9–4 | Nomo (3–1) | Elarton (0–3) | | 21,685 | 6–8 |
| 15 | April 22 | Dodgers | 7–1 (6) | Estes (3–1) | Lima (2–1) | | 19,667 | 7–8 |
| 16 | April 23 | Astros | 13–7 | Duckworth (1–0) | Jennings (1–2) | | 23,719 | 7–9 |
| 17 | April 24 | Astros | 8–5 | Clemens (4–0) | Fassero (0–1) | Dotel (2) | 35,260 | 7–10 |
| 18 | April 25 | Astros | 4–1 | Kennedy (3–0) | Miller (2–2) | Chacón (4) | 30,912 | 8–10 |
| 19 | April 26 | Marlins | 6–3 | Pavano (2–0) | Elarton (0–4) | Benítez (10) | 20,009 | 8–11 |
| 20 | April 27 | Marlins | 13–10 | Núñez (2–0) | Fox (0–1) | Chacón (5) | 20,615 | 9–11 |
| 21 | April 28 | Marlins | 9–4 | Beckett (2–2) | Jennings (1–3) | | 27,402 | 9–12 |

May (10-19)

| # | Date | Opponent | Score | Win | Loss | Save | Attendance | Record |
|---|---|---|---|---|---|---|---|---|
| 22 | May 1 | Braves | 3–2 | Núñez (3–0) | Reitsma (1–1) | Chacón (6) | 30,176 | 10–12 |
| 23 | May 1 | Braves | 11–7 | Nitkowski (1–0) | Núñez (3–1) | | 24,272 | 10–13 |
| 24 | May 2 | Braves | 13–4 | Estes (4–1) | Ramírez (0–3) | | 35,234 | 11–13 |
| 25 | May 4 | @ Expos | 10–4 | Vargas (2–1) | Jennings (1–4) | | 4,001 | 11–14 |
| 26 | May 5 | @ Expos | 2–0 | Kennedy (4–0) | Day (2–3) | Chacón (7) | 3,609 | 12–14 |
| 27 | May 6 | @ Expos | 3–1 | Hernández (2–2) | Elarton (0–5) | | 8,851 | 12–15 |
| 28 | May 7 | @ Cubs | 11–0 | Zambrano (3–1) | Estes (4–2) | | 37,307 | 12–16 |
| 29 | May 8 | @ Cubs | 4–3 | Jennings (2–4) | Maddux (2–3) | Chacón (8) | 39,546 | 13–16 |
| 30 | May 9 | @ Cubs | 5–4 (13) | Rusch (1–0) | Fassero (0–2) | | 39,155 | 13–17 |
| 31 | May 11 | Pirates | 15–10 (12) | Torres (2–1) | López (0–1) | | 21,123 | 13–18 |
| 32 | May 13 | Pirates | 7–5 | Estes (5–2) | Benson (3–3) | Chacón (9) | | 14–18 |
| 33 | May 13 | Pirates | 11–2 | Pérez (3–1) | Jennings (2–5) | | 20,041 | 14–19 |
| 34 | May 14 | Phillies | 6–4 | Milton (4–0) | Kennedy (4–1) | Worrell (2) | 32,171 | 14–20 |
| 35 | May 15 | Phillies | 16–5 | Myers (2–2) | Elarton (0–6) | | 33,629 | 14–21 |
| 36 | May 16 | Phillies | 7–6 | Harikkala (1–0) | Cormier (2–3) | Chacón (10) | 33,623 | 15–21 |
| 37 | May 17 | Phillies | 7–6 | Fuentes (1–0) | Worrell (0–1) | | 22,111 | 16–21 |
| 38 | May 18 | @ Reds | 8–3 | Estes (6–2) | Lidle (2–4) | | 17,389 | 17–21 |
| 39 | May 19 | @ Reds | 4–3 (10) | Riedling (2–0) | Fuentes (1–1) | | 16,410 | 17–22 |
| 40 | May 20 | @ Reds | 3–1 | Wilson (6–0) | Kennedy (4–2) | Graves (18) | 21,576 | 17–23 |
| 41 | May 21 | @ Mets | 9–7 | Ginter (1–0) | Young (0–1) | | 20,148 | 17–24 |
| 42 | May 22 | @ Mets | 5–4 | Weathers (4–1) | Núñez (3–2) | Looper (7) | 27,526 | 17–25 |
| 43 | May 23 | @ Mets | 4–0 | Glavine (6–2) | Estes (6–3) | | 37,486 | 17–26 |
| 44 | May 25 | Padres | 11–6 | Linebrink (2–0) | Fassero (0–3) | | 33,799 | 17–27 |
| 45 | May 26 | Padres | 13–6 | Jennings (3–5) | Eaton (1–5) | | 28,129 | 18–27 |
| 46 | May 27 | Padres | 4–3 (10) | Otsuka (4–2) | Núñez (3–3) | Hoffman (12) | 24,543 | 18–28 |
| 47 | May 28 | @ Giants | 4–2 | Brower (2–3) | Chacón (0–2) | | 39,983 | 18–29 |
| 48 | May 29 | @ Giants | 5–3 | Williams (4–3) | Fassero (0–4) | Herges (15) | 42,297 | 18–30 |
| 49 | May 30 | @ Giants | 3–1 | Schmidt (6–2) | Kennedy (4–3) | Herges (16) | 42,463 | 18–31 |
| 50 | May 31 | @ Padres | 7–1 | Jennings (4–5) | Eaton (1–6) | | 38,355 | 19–31 |

June (9-17)

| # | Date | Opponent | Score | Win | Loss | Save | Attendance | Record |
|---|---|---|---|---|---|---|---|---|
| 51 | June 1 | @ Padres | 7–1 | Cook (1–0) | Germano (1–1) | | 28,313 | 20–31 |
| 52 | June 2 | @ Padres | 2–1 (10) | Hoffman (1–0) | Fuentes (1–2) | | 38,521 | 20–32 |
| 53 | June 4 | Giants | 13–7 | Schmidt (7–2) | Fassero (0–5) | | 32,093 | 20–33 |
| 54 | June 5 | Giants | 11–2 | Jennings (5–5) | Rueter (2–5) | | 30,149 | 21–33 |
| 55 | June 6 | Giants | 16–4 | Hermanson (2–2) | Cook (1–1) | | 37,147 | 21–34 |
| 56 | June 7 | Giants | 10–5 | Brower (3–3) | Reed (0–1) | | 20,887 | 21–35 |
| 57 | June 8 | @ Yankees | 2–1 | Vázquez (7–4) | Fassero (0–6) | Rivera (24) | 51,852 | 21–36 |
| 58 | June 9 | @ Yankees | 7–5 | Quantrill (5–2) | Kennedy (4–4) | Rivera (25) | 38,013 | 21–37 |
| 59 | June 10 | @ Yankees | 10–4 | Contreras (3–2) | Jennings (5–6) | | 41,586 | 21–38 |
| 60 | June 11 | @ Devil Rays | 8–7 (10) | Báez (3–1) | Chacón (0–3) | | 9,280 | 21–39 |
| 61 | June 12 | @ Devil Rays | 10–7 | Halama (2–1) | Harikkala (1–1) | | 11,299 | 21–40 |
| 62 | June 13 | @ Devil Rays | 3–2 | Colomé (1–0) | Chacón (0–4) | | 11,227 | 21–41 |
| 63 | June 15 | Red Sox | 6–3 | Kennedy (5–4) | Arroyo (2–5) | Chacón (11) | 40,489 | 22–41 |
| 64 | June 16 | Red Sox | 7–6 | Jennings (6–6) | Schilling (8–4) | Chacón (12) | 39,319 | 23–41 |
| 65 | June 17 | Red Sox | 11–0 | Lowe (6–5) | Cook (1–2) | | 40,088 | 23–42 |
| 66 | June 18 | Orioles | 5–3 | Estes (7–3) | Ponson (3–9) | Chacón (13) | 30,148 | 24–42 |
| 67 | June 19 | Orioles | 11–6 | Fassero (1–6) | DuBose (4–6) | | 33,326 | 25–42 |
| 68 | June 20 | Orioles | 4–2 | Ryan (2–2) | Chacón (0–5) | Julio (10) | 40,532 | 25–43 |
| 69 | June 22 | @ Brewers | 6–2 | Davis (7–5) | López (0–2) | | 13,264 | 25–44 |
| 70 | June 23 | @ Brewers | 3–2 | Estes (8–3) | Capuano (2–3) | Chacón (14) | 19,964 | 26–44 |
| 71 | June 24 | @ Brewers | 3–0 | Cook (2–2) | Sheets (6–5) | Chacón (15) | 21,224 | 27–44 |
| 72 | June 25 | @ Indians | 10–8 (10) | Reed (1–1) | Jiménez (1–6) | Chacón (16) | 22,642 | 28–44 |
| 73 | June 26 | @ Indians | 4–3 (12) | Robertson (1–0) | Reed (1–2) | | 29,124 | 28–45 |
| 74 | June 27 | @ Indians | 5–3 | Miller (2–0) | Jennings (6–7) | Jiménez (8) | 27,252 | 28–46 |
| 75 | June 29 | Brewers | 6–3 | Capuano (3–3) | Estes (8–4) | Kolb (22) | 28,085 | 28–47 |
| 76 | June 30 | Brewers | 5–4 | Sheets (7–5) | Cook (2–3) | Kolb (23) | 24,126 | 28–48 |

July (18-10)

| # | Date | Opponent | Score | Win | Loss | Save | Attendance | Record |
|---|---|---|---|---|---|---|---|---|
| 77 | July 1 | Brewers | 10–9 | Santos (7–3) | Stark (0–3) | Kolb (24) | 24,360 | 28–49 |
| 78 | July 2 | Tigers | 9–8 (10) | Chacón (1–5) | Walker (1–3) | | 47,585 | 29–49 |
| 79 | July 3 | Tigers | 11–6 | Jennings (7–7) | Maroth (5–6) | | 48,131 | 30–49 |
| 80 | July 4 | Tigers | 10–8 | Bernero (1–0) | Knotts (4–3) | Chacón (17) | 26,944 | 31–49 |
| 81 | July 5 | @ Giants | 7–4 | Cook (3–3) | Tomko (3–5) | Chacón (18) | 39,977 | 32–49 |
| 82 | July 6 | @ Giants | 8–6 | Harikkala (2–1) | Christiansen (1–2) | Chacón (19) | 35,460 | 33–49 |
| 83 | July 7 | @ Giants | 8–4 | Rueter (5–6) | Bernero (1–1) | | 35,673 | 33–50 |
| 84 | July 8 | @ Padres | 5–1 | Jennings (8–7) | Eaton (4–8) | | 32,403 | 34–50 |
| 85 | July 9 | @ Padres | 6–5 | Harikkala (3–1) | Hoffman (2–1) | Chacón (20) | 41,168 | 35–50 |
| 86 | July 10 | @ Padres | 6–2 | Cook (4–3) | Lawrence (10–6) | | 37,644 | 36–50 |
| 87 | July 11 | @ Padres | 4–2 | Valdez (8–5) | Stark (0–4) | Hoffman (23) | 41,188 | 36–51 |
| 88 | July 15 | Giants | 7–5 | Brower (6–5) | Chacón (1–6) | Eyre (1) | 30,159 | 36–52 |
| 89 | July 16 | Giants | 7–1 | Estes (9–4) | Rueter (5–7) | | 31,583 | 37–52 |
| 90 | July 17 | Giants | 4–0 | Schmidt (12–2) | Cook (4–4) | | 41,450 | 37–53 |
| 91 | July 18 | Giants | 10–9 | Harikkala (4–1) | Herges (4–4) | | 35,032 | 38–53 |
| 92 | July 19 | Padres | 13–6 | Valdez (9–5) | Stark (0–5) | | 25,530 | 38–54 |
| 93 | July 20 | Padres | 9–7 | Eaton (5–8) | Jennings (8–8) | Hoffman (25) | 26,770 | 38–55 |
| 94 | July 21 | @ Dodgers | 6–5 | Estes (10–4) | Ishii (11–5) | Chacón (21) | 34,343 | 39–55 |
| 95 | July 22 | @ Dodgers | 4–2 | Mota (8–3) | Harikkala (4–2) | Gagné (28) | 34,276 | 39–56 |
| 96 | July 23 | @ Diamondbacks | 8–2 | Fassero (2–6) | Fossum (2–9) | | 26,350 | 40–56 |
| 97 | July 24 | @ Diamondbacks | 8–2 | Wright (1–0) | Cormier (0–2) | | 31,409 | 41–56 |
| 98 | July 25 | @ Diamondbacks | 3–2 | Jennings (9–8) | Choate (1–2) | Chacón (22) | 29,298 | 42–56 |
| 99 | July 26 | Dodgers | 9–7 | Sánchez (2–1) | Simpson (0–1) | Gagné (29) | 24,725 | 42–57 |
| 100 | July 27 | Dodgers | 7–2 | Cook (5–4) | Pérez (4–4) | | 27,934 | 43–57 |
| 101 | July 28 | Dodgers | 5–4 | Reed (2–2) | Mota (8–4) | Chacón (23) | 25,492 | 44–57 |
| 102 | July 29 | Dodgers | 3–2 | Álvarez (6–3) | Dohmann (0–1) | Gagné (30) | 28,472 | 44–58 |
| 103 | July 30 | Diamondbacks | 4–1 | Jennings (10–8) | Johnson (10–9) | Chacón (24) | 29,436 | 45–58 |
| 104 | July 31 | Diamondbacks | 8–4 | Estes (11–4) | Webb (4–12) | Chacón (25) | 32,392 | 46–58 |

August (9-18)

| # | Date | Opponent | Score | Win | Loss | Save | Attendance | Record |
|---|---|---|---|---|---|---|---|---|
| 105 | August 1 | Diamondbacks | 10–2 | Cook (6–4) | González (0–4) | | 24,193 | 47–58 |
| 106 | August 3 | Cubs | 5–3 | Wood (6–4) | Fassero (2–7) | Hawkins (17) | 40,716 | 47–59 |
| 107 | August 4 | Cubs | 11–8 | Farnsworth (4–3) | Chacón (1–7) | | 45,305 | 47–60 |
| 108 | August 5 | Cubs | 5–1 | Prior (3–2) | Jennings (10–9) | Rusch (1) | 38,195 | 47–61 |
| 109 | August 6 | Reds | 8–5 | Estes (12–4) | Claussen (1–2) | Chacón (26) | 26,187 | 48–61 |
| 110 | August 7 | Reds | 9–5 | Simpson (1–1) | Wilson (9–3) | | 33,649 | 49–61 |
| 111 | August 8 | Reds | 14–7 | Lidle (7–10) | Fassero (2–8) | | 28,721 | 49–62 |
| 112 | August 9 | @ Phillies | 4–2 | Harikkala (5–2) | Jones (8–3) | Chacón (27) | 42,031 | 50–62 |
| 113 | August 10 | @ Phillies | 5–4 | Reed (3–2) | Worrell (3–5) | Chacón (28) | 36,636 | 51–62 |
| 114 | August 11 | @ Phillies | 15–4 | Wolf (5–7) | Jennings (10–10) | | 40,634 | 51–63 |
| 115 | August 12 | @ Phillies | 3–1 | Estes (13–4) | Lidle (7–11) | Chacón (29) | 37,464 | 52–63 |
| 116 | August 13 | @ Pirates | 9–3 | Fassero (3–8) | Wells (5–7) | | 27,522 | 53–63 |
| 117 | August 14 | @ Pirates | 6–1 | Pérez (8–6) | Wright (1–1) | | 37,312 | 53–64 |
| 118 | August 15 | @ Pirates | 3–0 | Fogg (7–8) | Kennedy (5–5) | Mesa (33) | 24,862 | 53–65 |
| 119 | August 17 | Mets | 6–4 | Jennings (11–10) | Wheeler (3–1) | Chacón (30) | 34,387 | 54–65 |
| 120 | August 19 | Mets | 10–3 | Benson (10–9) | Estes (13–5) | | 30,827 | 54–66 |
| 121 | August 19 | Mets | 4–2 | Stanton (1–5) | Reed (3–3) | | 29,918 | 54–67 |
| 122 | August 20 | Expos | 4–3 | Ayala (5–9) | Fuentes (1–3) | Cordero (13) | 32,707 | 54–68 |
| 123 | August 21 | Expos | 5–2 | Kennedy (6–5) | Hernández (9–11) | | 33,225 | 55–68 |
| 124 | August 22 | Expos | 8–2 | Patterson (3–2) | Jennings (11–11) | | 26,833 | 55–69 |
| 125 | August 24 | @ Braves | 6–5 | Gryboski (2–2) | Harikkala (5–3) | Smoltz (33) | 27,914 | 55–70 |
| 126 | August 25 | @ Braves | 8–1 | Thomson (10–8) | Francis (0–1) | | 25,534 | 55–71 |
| 127 | August 26 | @ Braves | 6–4 | Hampton (10–9) | Wright (1–2) | Smoltz (34) | 28,360 | 55–72 |
| 128 | August 27 | @ Marlins | 3–0 | Valdez (11–7) | Kennedy (6–6) | Benítez (37) | 26,735 | 55–73 |
| 129 | August 28 | @ Marlins | 4–3 | Pavano (15–5) | Reed (3–4) | Benítez (38) | 35,243 | 55–74 |
| 130 | August 29 | @ Marlins | 8–4 | Burnett (5–6) | Estes (13–6) | | 39,104 | 55–75 |
| 131 | August 31 | @ Giants | 9–5 | Tomko (8–6) | Francis (0–2) | Hermanson (8) | 38,305 | 55–76 |

September (13-15)

| # | Date | Opponent | Score | Win | Loss | Save | Attendance | Record |
|---|---|---|---|---|---|---|---|---|
| 132 | September 1 | @ Giants | 4–1 | Wright (2–2) | Rueter (7–11) | Chacón (31) | 36,024 | 56–76 |
| 133 | September 2 | @ Giants | 6–5 | Kennedy (7–6) | Schmidt (15–6) | Chacón (32) | 36,971 | 57–76 |
| 134 | September 3 | @ Padres | 7–6 | Linebrink (6–1) | Dohmann (0–2) | Hoffman (34) | 35,555 | 57–77 |
| 135 | September 4 | @ Padres | 8–2 | Estes (14–6) | Tankersley (0–5) | | 42,716 | 58–77 |
| 136 | September 5 | @ Padres | 5–2 | Francis (1–2) | Lawrence (13–12) | | 33,272 | 59–77 |
| 137 | September 7 | Giants | 8–7 | Harikkala (6–3) | Christiansen (4–3) | Chacón (33) | 30,803 | 60–77 |
| 138 | September 8 | Giants | 5–3 | Walker (5–1) | Reed (3–5) | Hermanson (11) | 24,700 | 60–78 |
| 139 | September 9 | Padres | 9–7 | López (1–2) | Linebrink (7–2) | Chacón (34) | 20,027 | 61–78 |
| 140 | September 10 | Padres | 10–4 | Lawrence (14–12) | Harikkala (6–4) | | 22,279 | 61–79 |
| 141 | September 11 | Padres | 13–2 | Francis (2–2) | Eaton (9–13) | | 22,684 | 62–79 |
| 142 | September 12 | Padres | 15–2 | Peavy (12–5) | Reed (3–6) | | 21,608 | 62–80 |
| 143 | September 13 | @ Diamondbacks | 9–2 | Kennedy (8–6) | Fossum (4–13) | | 22,070 | 63–80 |
| 144 | September 14 | @ Diamondbacks | 4–3 (13) | Choate (2–3) | Reed (3–7) | | 23,175 | 63–81 |
| 145 | September 15 | @ Diamondbacks | 3–2 | Johnson (14–13) | Estes (14–7) | Aquino (12) | 22,598 | 63–82 |
| 146 | September 16 | @ Diamondbacks | 8–5 | Durbin (6–6) | Dohmann (0–3) | Fetters (1) | 22,281 | 63–83 |
| 147 | September 17 | Dodgers | 8–6 (10) | Gagné (7–3) | Chacón (1–8) | | 23,572 | 63–84 |
| 148 | September 18 | Dodgers | 8–1 | Kennedy (9–6) | Pérez (6–6) | | 21,664 | 64–84 |
| 149 | September 19 | Dodgers | 7–6 | Brazobán (2–0) | Chacón (1–9) | Gagné (42) | 27,175 | 64–85 |
| 150 | September 22 | Diamondbacks | 4–2 | Estes (15–7) | Johnson (14–14) | Chacón (35) | 20,125 | 65–85 |
| 151 | September 23 | Diamondbacks | 7–1 | Francis (3–2) | Webb (6–16) | | | 66–85 |
| 152 | September 23 | Diamondbacks | 2–1 (10) | Simpson (2–1) | Choate (2–4) | | 20,765 | 67–85 |
| 153 | September 24 | Cardinals | 5–4 | Suppan (16–8) | Jennings (11–12) | Calero (2) | 45,053 | 67–86 |
| 154 | September 25 | Cardinals | 10–6 | Flores (2–0) | Harikkala (6–5) | Isringhausen (46) | 29,751 | 67–87 |
| 155 | September 26 | Cardinals | 9–3 | Marquis (15–6) | Gissell (0–1) | Eldred (1) | 26,866 | 67–88 |
| 156 | September 27 | @ Dodgers | 8–7 | Brazobán (4–1) | Reed (3–8) | | 36,958 | 67–89 |
| 157 | September 28 | @ Dodgers | 5–4 | Dessens (2–6) | Harikkala (6–6) | | 33,588 | 67–90 |
| 158 | September 29 | @ Dodgers | 4–1 | Fuentes (2–3) | Brazobán (4–2) | Tsao (1) | 43,304 | 68–90 |
| 159 | September 30 | @ Dodgers | 4–2 (11) | Brazobán (5–2) | Fuentes (2–4) | | 53,438 | 68–91 |

October (0-3)

| # | Date | Opponent | Score | Win | Loss | Save | Attendance | Record |
|---|---|---|---|---|---|---|---|---|
| 160 | October 1 | @ Astros | 4–2 | Gallo (2–0) | Kennedy (9–7) | Lidge (28) | 41,717 | 68–92 |
| 161 | October 2 | @ Astros | 9–3 | Oswalt (20–10) | Estes (15–8) | | 43,279 | 68–93 |
| 162 | October 3 | @ Astros | 5–3 | Backe (5–3) | Wright (2–3) | Lidge (29) | 43,082 | 68–94 |

== Player stats ==
| = Indicates team leader |

=== Batting ===
==== Starters by position ====
Note: Pos = Position; G = Games played; AB = At bats; H = Hits; Avg. = Batting average; HR = Home runs; RBI = Runs batted in

| Pos | Player | G | AB | H | Avg. | HR | RBI |
|---|---|---|---|---|---|---|---|
| C | Charles Johnson | 109 | 305 | 72 | .236 | 13 | 47 |
| 1B | Todd Helton | 154 | 547 | 190 | .347 | 32 | 96 |
| 2B | Aaron Miles | 134 | 522 | 153 | .293 | 6 | 47 |
| SS | Royce Clayton | 146 | 574 | 160 | .279 | 8 | 54 |
| 3B | Vinny Castilla | 148 | 583 | 158 | .271 | 35 | 131 |
| LF | Matt Holliday | 121 | 400 | 116 | .290 | 14 | 57 |
| CF | Preston Wilson | 58 | 202 | 50 | .248 | 6 | 29 |
| RF | Jeromy Burnitz | 150 | 540 | 153 | .283 | 37 | 110 |

==== Other batters ====
Note: G = Games played; AB = At bats; H = Hits; Avg. = Batting average; HR = Home runs; RBI = Runs batted in

| Player | G | AB | H | Avg. | HR | RBI |
|---|---|---|---|---|---|---|
| Luis González | 102 | 322 | 94 | .292 | 12 | 40 |
| Todd Greene | 75 | 195 | 55 | .282 | 10 | 35 |
| Mark Sweeney | 122 | 177 | 47 | .266 | 9 | 40 |
| Kit Pellow | 59 | 121 | 29 | .240 | 2 | 10 |
| J.D. Closser | 36 | 113 | 36 | .319 | 1 | 10 |
| Larry Walker | 38 | 108 | 35 | .324 | 6 | 20 |
| Brad Hawpe | 42 | 105 | 26 | .248 | 3 | 9 |
| Denny Hocking | 55 | 94 | 19 | .202 | 0 | 4 |
| Jorge Piedra | 38 | 91 | 27 | .297 | 3 | 10 |
| Choo Freeman | 45 | 90 | 17 | .189 | 1 | 11 |
| Clint Barmes | 20 | 71 | 20 | .282 | 2 | 10 |
| René Reyes | 28 | 61 | 9 | .148 | 0 | 1 |
| Garrett Atkins | 15 | 28 | 10 | .357 | 1 | 8 |
| Andy Tracy | 15 | 16 | 3 | .188 | 0 | 1 |

=== Pitching ===
==== Starting pitchers ====
Note: G = Games pitched; IP = Innings pitched; W = Wins; L = Losses; ERA = Earned run average; SO = Strikeouts

| Player | G | IP | W | L | ERA | SO |
|---|---|---|---|---|---|---|
| Shawn Estes | 34 | 202.0 | 15 | 8 | 5.84 | 117 |
| Jason Jennings | 33 | 201.0 | 11 | 12 | 5.51 | 133 |
| Joe Kennedy | 27 | 162.1 | 9 | 7 | 3.66 | 117 |
| Aaron Cook | 17 | 96.2 | 6 | 4 | 4.28 | 40 |
| Jamey Wright | 14 | 78.2 | 2 | 3 | 4.12 | 41 |
| Scott Elarton | 8 | 41.1 | 0 | 6 | 9.80 | 23 |
| Jeff Francis | 7 | 36.2 | 3 | 2 | 5.15 | 32 |
| Denny Stark | 6 | 26.0 | 0 | 5 | 11.42 | 10 |
| Jason Young | 2 | 8.1 | 0 | 1 | 12.96 | 7 |

==== Other pitchers ====
Note: G = Games pitched; IP = Innings pitched; W = Wins; L = Losses; ERA = Earned run average; SO = Strikeouts

| Player | G | IP | W | L | ERA | SO |
|---|---|---|---|---|---|---|
| Jeff Fassero | 40 | 111.0 | 3 | 8 | 5.51 | 59 |
| Adam Bernero | 16 | 32.1 | 1 | 1 | 5.57 | 21 |
| Chris Gissell | 5 | 8.2 | 0 | 1 | 14.54 | 11 |

==== Relief pitchers ====
Note: G = Games pitched; W = Wins; L = Losses; SV = Saves; ERA = Earned run average; SO = Strikeouts

| Player | G | W | L | SV | ERA | SO |
|---|---|---|---|---|---|---|
| Shawn Chacón | 66 | 1 | 9 | 35 | 7.11 | 52 |
| Steve Reed | 65 | 3 | 8 | 0 | 3.68 | 38 |
| Javier López | 64 | 1 | 2 | 0 | 7.52 | 20 |
| Tim Harikkala | 55 | 6 | 6 | 0 | 4.74 | 30 |
| Brian Fuentes | 47 | 2 | 4 | 0 | 5.64 | 48 |
| Scott Dohmann | 41 | 0 | 3 | 0 | 4.11 | 49 |
| Allan Simpson | 32 | 2 | 1 | 0 | 5.08 | 46 |
| Vladimir Núñez | 22 | 3 | 3 | 0 | 7.01 | 22 |
| Turk Wendell | 12 | 0 | 0 | 0 | 7.02 | 11 |
| Chin-hui Tsao | 10 | 0 | 0 | 1 | 3.86 | 11 |
| Marc Kroon | 6 | 0 | 0 | 0 | 6.00 | 3 |
| Travis Driskill | 5 | 0 | 0 | 0 | 6.48 | 6 |
| Kevin Jarvis | 2 | 0 | 0 | 0 | 27.00 | 0 |

== Farm system ==
| Level | Team | League | Manager |
|---|---|---|---|
| AAA | Colorado Springs Sky Sox | Pacific Coast League | Marv Foley |
| AA | Tulsa Drillers | Texas League | Tom Runnells |
| A | Visalia Oaks | California League | Stu Cole |
| A | Asheville Tourists | South Atlantic League | Joe Mikulik |
| A-Short Season | Tri-City Dust Devils | Northwest League | Ron Gideon |
| Rookie | Casper Rockies | Pioneer League | P. J. Carey |

Records
| Preceded by 2003 | Colorado Rockies seasons 2004 | Succeeded by 2005 |
