= 2004 St. Louis Cardinals season =

Major League Baseball season

2004 St. Louis Cardinals
- National League champions National League Central champions
- League: National League
- Division: Central
- Ballpark: Busch Memorial Stadium
- City: St. Louis, Missouri
- Record: 105–57 (.644)
- Divisional place: 1st
- Owners: William DeWitt, Jr.
- General managers: Walt Jocketty
- Managers: Tony La Russa
- Television: Fox Sports Midwest (Joe Buck, Dan McLaughlin, Al Hrabosky); KPLR (Ricky Horton, Bob Carpenter, Rich Gould)
- Radio: KMOX (Mike Shannon, Wayne Hagin, Bob Ramsey)

The 2004 St. Louis Cardinals season was the 123rd season for the St. Louis Cardinals, a Major League Baseball franchise in St. Louis, Missouri. It was the 113th season for the Cardinals in the National League and their 39th in Busch Memorial Stadium.

The Cardinals went 105–57 during the season (the team's best record in the La Russa era), the most wins of any team in baseball that year, the most wins by any Cardinals team since 1944, and the first Cardinal team to win 100 or more games since 1985, and won the National League Central by 13 games over the NL Wild-Card Champion Houston Astros. In the playoffs the Cardinals defeated the Los Angeles Dodgers 3 games to 1 in the NLDS and the Astros 4 games to 3 in the NLCS to reach their first World Series since 1987. In the World Series the Cardinals faced the Boston Red Sox and were swept 4 games to 0. It was the final World Series played at Busch Memorial Stadium.

Catcher Mike Matheny, third baseman Scott Rolen, and outfielder Jim Edmonds won Gold Gloves this year.

== Offseason ==
- December 2, 2003: Signed free agent pitcher Chris Carpenter.
- December 13, 2003: Traded outfielder J. D. Drew and catcher Eli Marrero to the Atlanta Braves for pitchers Jason Marquis, Ray King, and Adam Wainwright.
- January 10, 2004: Signed free agent pitcher Alan Benes.
- February 12, 2004: Signed free agent John Mabry.

== Regular season ==
=== Opening Day lineup ===
4	Tony Womack	2B
12	Ray Lankford	LF
5	Albert Pujols	1B
15	Jim Edmonds	CF
27	Scott Rolen	3B
3	Édgar Rentería	SS
16	Reggie Sanders	RF
22	Mike Matheny	C
35	Matt Morris	P

=== Summary ===
Acquired via trade from the Colorado Rockies on August 6, 2004, Larry Walker, customarily the Rockies' number three hitter, became the Cardinals' number two hitter. The Cardinals already had Edmonds, Pujols and Rolen in the 3 through 5 spots. Walker made his Cardinals debut on August 7, playing the New York Mets, and appeared as a pinch-hitter and struck out in the seventh inning. He drew a walk from Mike Stanton in the ninth inning and scored the game-winning run on a Yadier Molina single.

=== Season standings ===
==== National League Central ====
NL Central
Team	W	L	Pct.	GB	Home	Road
St. Louis Cardinals	105	57	.648	—	53‍–‍28	52‍–‍29
Houston Astros	92	70	.568	13	48‍–‍33	44‍–‍37
Chicago Cubs	89	73	.549	16	45‍–‍37	44‍–‍36
Cincinnati Reds	76	86	.469	29	40‍–‍41	36‍–‍45
Pittsburgh Pirates	72	89	.447	32½	39‍–‍41	33‍–‍48
Milwaukee Brewers	67	94	.416	37½	36‍–‍45	31‍–‍49

==== Record vs. opponents ====
2004 National League record Source: MLB Standings Grid – 2004
Team	AZ	ATL	CHC	CIN	COL	FLA	HOU	LAD	MIL	MON	NYM	PHI	PIT	SD	SF	STL	AL
Arizona	—	2–4	4–2	3–3	6–13	3–4	2–4	3–16	3–3	0–6	3–4	1–5	2–4	7–12	5–14	1–5	6–12
Atlanta	4–2	—	3–3	2–4	4–2	14–5	3–3	4–3	4–2	15–4	12–7	10–9	4–2	3–3	4–3	2–4	8–10
Chicago	2–4	3–3	—	9–8	5–1	3–3	10–9	2–4	10–7	3–3	4–2	3–3	13–5	4–2	2–4	8–11	8–4
Cincinnati	3–3	4–2	8–9	—	3–3	4–2	6–11	4–2	10–8	4–2	3–3	3–3	9–10	2–4	3–3	5–14	5-7
Colorado	13–6	2–4	1–5	3–3	—	1–5	1–5	8–11	2–4	2–4	1–5	5–3	2–4	10–9	8–11	1–5	8–10
Florida	4–3	5–14	3–3	2–4	5–1	—	3–3	3–3	4–2	11–8	15–4	12–7	1–5	4–2	2–5	2–4	7–11
Houston	4–2	3–3	9–10	11–6	5–1	3-3	—	1–5	13–6	2–4	2–4	6–0	12–5	2–4	2–4	10–8	7–5
Los Angeles	16–3	3–4	4–2	2–4	11–8	3–3	5–1	—	3–3	4–3	3–3	1–5	6–0	10–9	10–9	2–4	10–8
Milwaukee	3–3	2–4	7–10	8–10	4–2	2–4	6–13	3–3	—	5–1	2–4	0–6	6–12	2–4	1–5	8–9	8–4
Montreal	6–0	4–15	3–3	2–4	4–2	8-11	4–2	3–4	1–5	—	9–10	7–12	4–2	1–6	1–5	3–3	7–11
New York	4–3	7–12	2–4	3–3	5–1	4–15	4–2	3–3	4–2	10–9	—	8–11	1–5	1–6	4–2	1–5	10–8
Philadelphia	5-1	9–10	3–3	3–3	3–5	7–12	0–6	5–1	6–0	12–7	11–8	—	3–3	5–1	2–4	3–3	9–9
Pittsburgh	4–2	2–4	5–13	10–9	4–2	5–1	5–12	0–6	12–6	2–4	5–1	3–3	—	3–3	5–1	5–12	2–10
San Diego	12–7	3–3	2–4	4–2	9–10	2–4	4–2	9–10	4–2	6–1	6–1	1–5	3–3	—	12–7	2–4	8–10
San Francisco	14–5	3–4	4–2	3–3	11–8	5–2	4–2	9–10	5–1	5–1	2–4	4–2	1–5	7–12	—	3–3	11–7
St. Louis	5–1	4–2	11–8	14–5	5–1	4-2	8–10	4–2	9–8	3–3	5–1	3–3	12–5	4–2	3–3	—	11–1

=== Transactions ===
- August 6: Traded Jason Burch (minors) and players to be named later to the Colorado Rockies for outfielder Larry Walker. The Cardinals sent pitchers Luís Martínez and Chris Narveson on August 11 to the Rockies to complete the trade.

=== Game log ===
2004 St. Louis Cardinals Game Log (105–57)
April: (12–11)

#	Date	Opponent	Score	Win	Loss	Save	Attendance	Record
1	April 5	Brewers	6–8	Burba (1–0)	Morris (0–1)	Kolb (1)	49,149	0–1
2	April 6	Brewers	5–7	Davis (1–0)	Marquis (0–1)	Kolb (2)	23,966	0–2
3	April 7	Brewers	9–4	Lincoln (1–0)	Hernandez (0–1)	—	23,488	1–2
4	April 8	Brewers	5–11	Capuano (1–0)	Suppan (0–1)	Burba (1)	27,433	1–3
5	April 9	@ Diamondbacks	13–6	Carpenter (1–0)	Daigle (0–1)	—	35,930	2–3
6	April 10	@ Diamondbacks	10–2	Morris (1–1)	Sparks (0–1)	—	38,842	3–3
7	April 11	@ Diamondbacks	6–5	Lincoln (2–0)	Mantei (0–1)	Isringhausen (1)	32,072	4–3
8	April 12	Astros	5–10	Stone (1–0)	Lincoln (2–1)	—	26,654	4–4
9	April 13	Astros	3–5	Clemens (2–0)	Suppan (0–2)	Dotel (1)	24,939	4–5
10	April 14	Astros	1–11	Miller (2–0)	Carpenter (1–1)	—	26,605	4–6
11	April 16	Rockies	13–5	Morris (2–1)	Stark (0–2)	—	34,541	5–6
12	April 17	Rockies	8–4	Marquis (1–1)	Estes (2–1)	—	46,471	6–6
13	April 18	Rockies	5–8	Jennings (1–1)	Williams (0–1)	Chacon (3)	34,697	6–7
14	April 20	@ Astros	5–3	Suppan (1–2)	Miller (2–1)	Isringhausen (2)	29,625	7–7
15	April 21	@ Astros	12–6	Morris (3–1)	Redding (0–3)	—	27,354	8–7
16	April 22	@ Astros	2–1 (12)	Isringhausen (1–0)	Miceli (0–1)	Tavarez (1)	33,706	9–7
17	April 23	@ Brewers	1–2	Kieschnick (1–0)	Kline (0–1)	—	17,107	9–8
18	April 24	@ Brewers	1–3	Saenz (1–0)	Williams (0–2)	Kolb (5)	22,222	9–9
19	April 25	@ Brewers	5–2	Suppan (2–2)	Sheets (3–1)	—	18,135	10–9
20	April 27	Phillies	3–7	Milton (2–0)	Morris (3–2)	—	25,185	10–10
21	April 28	Phillies	3–6	Madson (1–1)	Lincoln (2–2)	Wagner (6)	26,348	10–11
22	April 29	Phillies	5–4 (13)	Lincoln (3–2)	Telemaco (0–1)	—	29,768	11–11
23	April 30	Cubs	4–3	Kline (1–1)	Farnsworth (0–1)	—	44,224	12–11

May: (15–12)

#	Date	Opponent	Score	Win	Loss	Save	Attendance	Record
24	May 1	Cubs	2–4	Clement (4–1)	Suppan (2–3)	Borowski (6)	49,505	12–12
25	May 2	Cubs	1–0 (10)	Isringhausen (2–0)	Farnsworth (0–2)	—	47,757	13–12
26	May 3	Cubs	3–7	Maddux (2–2)	Marquis (1–2)	—	40,340	13–13
27	May 4	@ Phillies	6–5	Carpenter (2–1)	Myers (0–2)	Isringhausen (3)	33,294	14–13
28	May 5	@ Phillies	4–5	Millwood (3–2)	Williams (0–3)	Wagner (7)	35,944	14–14
29	May 6	@ Phillies	7–4	Suppan (3–3)	Wolf (2–2)	Isringhausen (4)	44,376	15–14
30	May 7	@ Expos	2–4	Kim (2–0)	Morris (3–3)	Biddle (6)	5,332	15–15
31	May 8	@ Expos	0–2	Ohka (1–5)	Marquis (1–3)	Biddle (7)	5,611	15–16
32	May 9	@ Expos	5–2	Carpenter (3–1)	Vargas (2–2)	Isringhausen (5)	12,301	16–16
33	May 11	Braves	5–1	Williams (1–3)	Wright (2–3)	—	35,000	17–16
34	May 12	Braves	5–2	Morris (4–3)	Hampton (0–4)	Isringhausen (6)	28,921	18–16
35	May 13	Braves	5–6	Alfonseca (4–0)	Suppan (3–4)	Smoltz (5)	40,472	18–17
36	May 14	Marlins	6–3	Marquis (2–3)	Beckett (3–3)	Isringhausen (7)	36,810	19–17
37	May 15	Marlins	4–0	Carpenter (4–1)	Oliver (2–2)	Tavarez (2)	42,958	20–17
38	May 16	Marlins	2–3	Penny (4–2)	Williams (1–4)	Benitez (15)	46,889	20–18
39	May 18	@ Mets	4–5	Bottalico (1–0)	Isringhausen (2–1)	—	28,880	20–19
40	May 19	@ Mets	1–0	Eldred (1–0)	Stanton (0–1)	Kline (1)	20,229	21–19
41	May 20	@ Mets	11–4	Marquis (3–3)	Seo (2–4)	—	21,874	22–19
42	May 21	@ Cubs	7–6	Carpenter (5–1)	Mitre (2–3)	Isringhausen (8)	39,298	23–19
43	May 22	@ Cubs	1–7	Rusch (2–0)	Williams (1–5)	—	40,131	23–20
44	May 23	@ Cubs	3–4	Clement (6–3)	Morris (4–4)	Borowski (8)	40,090	23–21
–	May 25	Pirates	Postponed (snow); rescheduled for August 20					
45	May 26	Pirates	8–11	Benson (4–3)	Marquis (3–4)	—	29,526	23–22
46	May 27	Pirates	6–3	Suppan (4–4)	Vogelsong (1–4)	Isringhausen (9)	31,107	24–22
47	May 28	@ Astros	2–1 (10)	Isringhausen (3–1)	Dotel (0–3)	—	41,399	25–22
48	May 29	@ Astros	10–3	Williams (2–5)	Miller (5–5)	—	41,141	26–22
49	May 30	@ Astros	1–7	Redding (3–3)	Morris (4–5)	—	41,117	26–23
50	May 31	@ Pirates	8–3	Marquis (4–4)	Benson (4–4)	—	12,582	27–23

June: (19–9)

#	Date	Opponent	Score	Win	Loss	Save	Attendance	Record
51	June 1	@ Pirates	8–1	Suppan (5–4)	Vogelsong (1–5)	—	11,540	28–23
52	June 2	@ Pirates	5–3	Carpenter (6–1)	Johnston (0–2)	Isringhausen (10)	12,100	29–23
53	June 3	@ Pirates	4–2	Williams (3–5)	Perez (3–3)	Isringhausen (11)	15,386	30–23
54	June 4	Astros	5–3	Morris (5–5)	Miller (5–6)	Isringhausen (12)	47,373	31–23
55	June 5	Astros	10–4	Marquis (5–4)	Redding (3–4)	—	46,003	32–23
56	June 6	Astros	2–3	Oswalt (4–4)	Suppan (5–5)	Dotel (9)	40,476	32–24
57	June 7	@ Cubs	4–3	Carpenter (7–1)	Rusch (2–1)	Isringhausen (13)	39,226	33–24
58	June 8	@ Cubs	3–7	Clement (7–4)	Williams (3–6)	—	39,338	33–25
59	June 9	@ Cubs	12–4	Morris (6–5)	Prior (0–1)	—	38,693	34–25
60	June 10	@ Cubs	3–12	Zambrano (7–2)	Haren (0–1)	—	38,707	34–26
61	June 11	@ Rangers	12–7	Suppan (6–5)	Dominguez (1–2)	—	32,962	35–26
62	June 12	@ Rangers	2–7	Drese (3–3)	Carpenter (7–2)	—	42,173	35–27
63	June 13	@ Rangers	13–2	Williams (4–6)	Dickey (4–6)	—	41,087	36–27
64	June 15	Athletics	8–4	Morris (7–5)	Bradford (3–3)	Isringhausen (14)	33,866	37–27
65	June 16	Athletics	6–2	Marquis (6–4)	Harden (3–4)	Calero (1)	33,386	38–27
66	June 17	Athletics	5–4	King (1–0)	Mecir (0–5)	—	32,528	39–27
67	June 18	Reds	4–3 (10)	Tavarez (1–0)	Matthews (1–1)	—	37,946	40–27
68	June 19	Reds	9–2	Williams (5–6)	Acevedo (3–6)	Isringhausen (15)	48,641	41–27
69	June 20	Reds	0–6	Bong (1–1)	Morris (7–6)	—	45,620	41–28
70	June 22	Cubs	4–5	Farnsworth (3–3)	Isringhausen (3–2)	Hawkins (9)	45,070	41–29
71	June 23	Cubs	10–9	Kline (2–1)	Remlinger (0–1)	—	43,127	42–29
72	June 24	Cubs	4–0	Carpenter (8–2)	Clement (7–6)	—	48,042	43–29
73	June 25	@ Royals	5–2	Morris (8–6)	Greinke (1–4)	Isringhausen (16)	40,628	44–29
74	June 26	@ Royals	3–1 (10)	Tavarez (2–0)	Seanez (0–1)	Isringhausen (17)	40,963	45–29
75	June 27	@ Royals	10–3	Marquis (7–4)	Gobble (4–5)	—	36,651	46–29
76	June 28	@ Pirates	1–2	Mesa (1–0)	Tavarez (2–1)	—	15,544	46–30
77	June 29	@ Pirates	0–3	Burnett (1–2)	Carpenter (8–3)	Mesa (18)	18,152	46–31
78	June 30	@ Pirates	5–6	Mesa (2–0)	Tavarez (2–2)	—	22,368	46–32

July: (20–5)

#	Date	Opponent	Score	Win	Loss	Save	Attendance	Record
79	July 2	Mariners	11–2	Williams (6–6)	Thornton (0–1)	—	35,186	47–32
80	July 3	Mariners	8–1	Marquis (8–4)	Franklin (3–7)	—	38,055	48–32
81	July 4	Mariners	2–1	Suppan (7–5)	Pineiro (4–9)	Isringhausen (18)	37,183	49–32
82	July 5	Reds	4–1	Carpenter (9–3)	Lidle (6–6)	Isringhausen (19)	41,852	50–32
83	July 6	Reds	5–3	Morris (9–6)	White (0–2)	Kline (2)	29,786	51–32
84	July 7	Reds	4–2	King (2–0)	Riedling (4–2)	Isringhausen (20)	34,999	52–32
85	July 9	Cubs	6–1	Marquis (9–4)	Maddux (7–7)	—	49,675	53–32
86	July 10	Cubs	5–2	Suppan (8–5)	Clement (7–8)	Isringhausen (21)	50,569	54–32
87	July 11	Cubs	4–8	Wood (4–3)	Carpenter (9–4)	—	49,250	54–33
75th All-Star Game in Houston, Texas
88	July 15	@ Reds	7–2	Morris (10–6)	Sanchez (0–2)	—	31,961	55–33
89	July 16	@ Reds	7–5	Calero (1–0)	Graves (1–4)	Isringhausen (22)	39,140	56–33
90	July 17	@ Reds	5–7	Jones (8–2)	Tavarez (2–3)	Graves (34)	36,079	56–34
91	July 18	@ Reds	10–4	Suppan (9–5)	Acevedo (4–8)	—	31,699	57–34
92	July 19	@ Cubs	5–4	Carpenter (10–4)	Zambrano (9–5)	Isringhausen (23)	40,033	58–34
93	July 20	@ Cubs	11–8	King (3–0)	Hawkins (2–2)	Isringhausen (24)	39,371	59–34
94	July 21	Brewers	1–0	Williams (7–6)	Santos (9–4)	Isringhausen (25)	37,104	60–34
95	July 22	Brewers	4–0	Marquis (10–4)	Sheets (9–7)	—	35,100	61–34
96	July 23	Giants	2–7	Hermanson (4–3)	Suppan (9–6)	—	45,892	61–35
97	July 24	Giants	3–5 (10)	Rodriguez (3–4)	King (3–1)	Christiansen (2)	48,145	61–36
98	July 25	Giants	6–0	Morris (11–6)	Williams (9–7)	—	42,315	62–36
99	July 26	@ Reds	9–6 (11)	King (4–1)	Norton (1–3)	—	23,155	63–36
100	July 27	@ Reds	6–0	Marquis (11–4)	Lidle (6–9)	—	25,366	64–36
101	July 28	@ Reds	11–10	Eldred (2–0)	Acevedo (4–10)	Isringhausen (26)	33,282	65–36
102	July 30	@ Giants	7–4	Carpenter (11–4)	Brower (6–6)	Isringhausen (27)	42,622	66–36
103	July 31	@ Giants	7–8	Rueter (6–8)	Morris (11–7)	Christiansen (3)	42,633	66–37

August: (21–7)

#	Date	Opponent	Score	Win	Loss	Save	Attendance	Record
104	August 1	@ Giants	6–1	Williams (8–6)	Schmidt (13–4)	—	41,880	67–37
105	August 3	Expos	6–10 (12)	Cordero (3–1)	Haren (0–2)	—	33,696	67–38
106	August 4	Expos	5–4	Tavarez (3–3)	Cordero (3–2)	—	35,779	68–38
107	August 5	Expos	2–1	Carpenter (12–4)	Ayala (3–7)	Isringhausen (28)	31,961	69–38
108	August 6	Mets	6–4	Morris (12–7)	Glavine (8–10)	Isringhausen (29)	43,949	70–38
109	August 7	Mets	2–1	Tavarez (4–3)	Stanton (0–5)	—	45,364	71–38
110	August 8	Mets	6–2	Marquis (12–4)	Leiter (8–4)	Tavarez (3)	43,578	72–38
111	August 10	@ Marlins	2–1 (10)	Tavarez (5–3)	Mota (8–5)	Isringhausen (30)	17,413	73–38
112	August 11	@ Marlins	1–0	Suppan (10–6)	Pavano (12–5)	Isringhausen (31)	18,686	74–38
113	August 12	@ Marlins	2–8	Burnett (3–5)	Morris (12–8)	—	16,187	74–39
114	August 13	@ Braves	4–1	Williams (9–6)	Byrd (4–4)	Isringhausen (32)	38,843	75–39
115	August 14	@ Braves	7–9	Alfonseca (6–4)	King (4–2)	Smoltz (29)	44,413	75–40
116	August 15	@ Braves	10–4	Haren (1–2)	Thomson (9–8)	—	28,983	76–40
117	August 16	Reds	10–5	Suppan (11–6)	Harang (7–5)	Isringhausen (33)	33,957	77–40
118	August 17	Reds	7–2	Eldred (3–0)	Graves (1–5)	—	33,466	78–40
119	August 18	Reds	4–5	Hancock (3–1)	Williams (9–7)	Graves (37)	35,960	78–41
120	August 19	Pirates	2–3 (10)	Mesa (5–1)	Kline (2–2)	Grabow (1)	33,854	78–42
121	August 20 (1)	Pirates	5–4	Haren (2–2)	Fogg (7–9)	Isringhausen (34)	32,062	79–42
122	August 20 (2)	Pirates	5–3	Carpenter (13–4)	Gonzalez (3–1)	Isringhausen (35)	38,640	80–42
123	August 21	Pirates	10–6	Suppan (12–6)	Burnett (5–5)	—	46,017	81–42
124	August 22	Pirates	11–4	Morris (13–8)	Vogelsong (4–10)	Kline (3)	35,345	82–42
125	August 24	@ Reds	3–4 (10)	Valentine (1–1)	Tavarez (5–4)	—	20,163	82–43
126	August 25	@ Reds	6–5	Tavarez (6–4)	Valentine (1–2)	Isringhausen (36)	18,962	83–43
127	August 26	@ Reds	0–1	Harang (8–6)	Carpenter (13–5)	—	19,421	83–44
128	August 27	@ Pirates	8–5	Suppan (13–6)	Vogelsong (4–11)	Isringhausen (37)	27,475	84–44
129	August 28	@ Pirates	6–4	Morris (14–8)	Figueroa (0–1)	Isringhausen (38)	19,167	85–44
130	August 29	@ Pirates	4–0	Marquis (13–4)	Perez (9–7)	Tavarez (4)	25,005	86–44
131	August 31	Padres	9–3	Williams (10–7)	Lawrence (13–11)	—	30,816	87–44

September: (16–12)

#	Date	Opponent	Score	Win	Loss	Save	Attendance	Record
132	September 1	Padres	4–2	Carpenter (14–5)	Eaton (9–12)	Isringhausen (39)	32,390	88–44
133	September 2	Padres	7–2	Suppan (14–6)	Peavy (11–4)	—	32,785	89–44
134	September 3	Dodgers	3–0	Morris (15–8)	Lima (11–5)	—	37,524	90–44
135	September 4	Dodgers	5–1	Marquis (14–4)	Ishii (13–7)	—	45,692	91–44
136	September 5	Dodgers	6–5 (11)	King (5–2)	Carrara (4–2)	—	43,611	92–44
137	September 6	@ Padres	3–7	Linebrink (7–1)	Eldred (3–1)	Hoffman (35)	34,382	92–45
138	September 7	@ Padres	4–2	Suppan (15–6)	Peavy (11–5)	Isringhausen (40)	32,738	93–45
139	September 8	@ Padres	5–10	Wells (10–7)	Morris (15–9)	—	34,277	93–46
140	September 10	@ Dodgers	6–7	Carrara (5–2)	Calero (1–1)	Gagne (39)	54,119	93–47
141	September 11	@ Dodgers	5–6	Stewart (1–2)	Eldred (3–2)	Gagne (40)	53,494	93–48
142	September 12	@ Dodgers	7–6	Carpenter (15–5)	Jackson (2–1)	Isringhausen (41)	54,000	94–48
143	September 14	Astros	5–7	Clemens (17–4)	Suppan (15–7)	Lidge (22)	29,528	94–49
144	September 15	Astros	4–2	Calero (2–1)	Springer (0–1)	Isringhausen (42)	32,891	95–49
145	September 16	Astros	3–8	Harville (2–2)	Marquis (14–5)	—	28,704	95–50
146	September 17	Diamondbacks	4–3	Isringhausen (4–2)	Service (1–1)	—	37,280	96–50
147	September 18	Diamondbacks	7–0	Haren (3–2)	Fossum (4–14)	—	43,791	97–50
148	September 19	Diamondbacks	2–3	Gosling (1–0)	Suppan (15–8)	Aquino (13)	41,279	97–51
149	September 20	@ Brewers	7–4	Tavarez (7–4)	Kolb (0–4)	Isringhausen (43)	14,213	98–51
150	September 21	@ Brewers	4–6	Santos (11–11)	Marquis (14–6)	Kolb (38)	25,675	98–52
151	September 22	@ Brewers	3–2	Williams (11–7)	Sheets (11–13)	Isringhausen (44)	21,461	99–52
152	September 23	@ Brewers	4–2	Eldred (4–2)	Wise (1–2)	Isringhausen (45)	15,200	100–52
153	September 24	@ Rockies	5–4	Suppan (16–8)	Jennings (11–12)	Calero (2)	45,053	101–52
154	September 25	@ Rockies	10–6	Flores (1–0)	Harikkala (6–5)	Isringhausen (46)	29,751	102–52
155	September 26	@ Rockies	9–3	Marquis (15–6)	Gissell (0–1)	Eldred (1)	26,866	103–52
156	September 27	@ Astros	3–10	Oswalt (19–10)	Williams (11–8)	—	37,651	103–53
157	September 28	@ Astros	1–2	Backe (4–3)	Haren (3–3)	Lidge (26)	36,230	103–54
158	September 29	@ Astros	4–6	Qualls (4–0)	Suppan (16–9)	Lidge (27)	43,186	103–55
159	September 30	Brewers	6–7	Davis (12–12)	Morris (15–10)	Kolb (39)	24,893	103–56

October: (2–1)

#	Date	Opponent	Score	Win	Loss	Save	Attendance	Record
160	October 1	Brewers	4–1	Ankiel (1–0)	Hendrickson (1–8)	Isringhausen (47)	32,605	104–56
161	October 2	Brewers	1–5	Sheets (12–14)	Marquis (15–7)	—	41,219	104–57
162	October 3	Brewers	9–4	Calero (3–1)	de la Rosa (0–3)	—	39,849	105–57

=== Postseason Game Log ===
2004 St. Louis Cardinals Postseason Game Log (7–8)
NLDS: (3–1)

#	Date	Opponent	Score	Win	Loss	Save	Attendance	Record
1	October 5	Dodgers	8–3	Williams (1–0)	Perez (0–1)	—	52,127	1–0
2	October 7	Dodgers	8–3	Haren (1–0)	Weaver (0–1)	—	52,228	2–0
3	October 9	@ Dodgers	0–4	Lima (1–0)	Morris (0–1)	—	55,992	2–1
4	October 10	@ Dodgers	6–2	Suppan (1–0)	Alvarez (0–1)	—	56,268	3–1

NLCS: (4–3)

#	Date	Opponent	Score	Win	Loss	Save	Attendance	Record
1	October 13	Astros	10–7	Williams (2–0)	Qualls (0–1)	Isringhausen (1)	52,323	1–0
2	October 14	Astros	6–4	Tavarez (1–0)	Miceli (0–2)	Isringhausen (2)	52,347	2–0
3	October 16	@ Astros	2–5	Clemens (2–0)	Suppan (1–1)	Lidge (2)	42,896	2–1
4	October 17	@ Astros	5–6	Wheeler (1–0)	Tavarez (1–1)	Lidge (3)	42,760	2–2
5	October 18	@ Astros	0–3	Lidge (1–0)	Isringhausen (0–1)	—	43,045	2–3
6	October 20	Astros	6–4 (12)	Tavarez (2–1)	Miceli (0–3)	—	52,144	3–3
7	October 21	Astros	5–2	Suppan (2–1)	Clemens (2–1)	Isringhausen (3)	52,140	4–3

World Series: (0–4)

#	Date	Opponent	Score	Win	Loss	Save	Attendance	Record
1	October 23	@ Red Sox	9–11	Foulke (1–0)	Tavarez (2–2)	—	35,035	0–1
2	October 24	@ Red Sox	2–6	Schilling (3–1)	Morris (0–2)	—	35,001	0–2
3	October 26	Red Sox	1–4	Martínez (2–1)	Suppan (2–2)	—	52,015	0–3
4	October 27	Red Sox	0–3	Lowe (3–0)	Marquis (0–1)	Foulke (3)	52,037	0–4

=== Roster ===
2004 St. Louis Cardinals
Roster
Pitchers: 49 Rick Ankiel; 40 Kiko Calero; 68 Carmen Cali; 29 Chris Carpenter; 23 Cal Eldred; 61 Randy Flores; 55 Dan Haren; 44 Jason Isringhausen; 56 Ray King; 34 Steve Kline; 36 Mike Lincoln; 21 Jason Marquis; 35 Matt Morris; 54 Josh Pearce; 52 Al Reyes; 46 Jason Simontacchi; 37 Jeff Suppan; 50 Julián Tavárez; 19 Woody Williams	Catchers: 22 Mike Matheny; 26 Cody McKay; 41 Yadier Molina; Infielders: 8 Marlon Anderson; 31 Bo Hart; 7 Héctor Luna; 5 Albert Pujols; 3 Édgar Rentería; 27 Scott Rolen; 4 Tony Womack	Outfielders: 32 Roger Cedeño; 15 Jim Edmonds; 12 Ray Lankford; 47 John Mabry; 28 Colin Porter; 16 Reggie Sanders; 99 So Taguchi; 33 Larry Walker	Manager: 10 Tony La Russa; Coaches: 18 Dave Duncan (pitching); 38 Marty Mason (bullpen); 39 Dave McKay (first base); 11 José Oquendo (third base); 43 Mitchell Page (hitting); 24 Joe Pettini (bench)

== Player stats ==
=== Batting ===
==== Starters by position ====
Note: Pos = Position; G = Games played; AB = At bats; H = Hits; Avg. = Batting average; HR = Home runs; RBI = Runs batted in

Pos	Player	G	AB	H	Avg.	HR	RBI
C	Mike Matheny	122	385	95	.247	5	50
1B	Albert Pujols	154	592	196	.331	46	123
2B	Tony Womack	145	553	170	.307	5	38
SS	Édgar Rentería	149	586	168	.287	10	72
3B	Scott Rolen	142	500	157	.314	34	124
LF	Ray Lankford	92	200	51	.255	6	22
CF	Jim Edmonds	153	498	150	.301	42	111
RF	Reggie Sanders	135	446	116	.260	22	67

==== Other batters ====
Note: G = Games played; AB = At bats; H = Hits; Avg. = Batting average; HR = Home runs; RBI = Runs batted in

Player	G	AB	H	Avg.	HR	RBI
Marlon Anderson	113	253	60	.237	8	28
John Mabry	87	240	71	.296	13	40
Roger Cedeño	95	200	53	.265	3	23
So Taguchi	109	179	52	.291	3	25
Héctor Luna	83	173	43	.249	3	22
Larry Walker	44	150	42	.280	11	27
Yadier Molina	51	135	36	.267	2	15
Cody McKay	35	74	17	.230	0	6
Colin Porter	23	35	11	.314	1	2
Bo Hart	11	13	2	.154	0	2

=== Pitching ===
==== Starting pitchers ====
Note: G = Games pitched; IP = Innings pitched; W = Wins; L = Losses; ERA = Earned run average; SO = Strikeouts

Player	G	IP	W	L	ERA	SO
Matt Morris	32	202.0	15	10	4.72	131
Jason Marquis	32	201.1	15	7	3.71	138
Woody Williams	31	189.2	11	8	4.18	131
Jeff Suppan	31	188.0	16	9	4.16	110
Chris Carpenter	28	182.0	15	5	3.46	152

==== Other pitchers ====
Note: G = Games pitched; IP = Innings pitched; W = Wins; L = Losses; ERA = Earned run average; SO = Strikeouts

Player	G	IP	W	L	ERA	SO
Dan Haren	14	46.0	3	3	4.50	32
Randy Flores	9	14.0	1	0	1.93	7
Al Reyes	12	12.0	0	0	0.75	11

==== Relief pitchers ====
Note: G = Games pitched; W = Wins; L = Losses; SV = Saves; ERA = Earned run average; SO = Strikeouts

Player	G	W	L	SV	ERA	SO
Jason Isringhausen	74	4	2	47	2.87	71
Ray King	86	5	2	0	2.61	40
Julián Tavárez	77	7	4	4	2.38	48
Steve Kline	67	2	2	3	1.79	35
Cal Eldred	52	4	2	1	3.76	54
Kiko Calero	41	3	1	2	2.78	47
Mike Lincoln	13	3	2	0	5.19	14
Jason Simontacchi	13	0	0	0	5.28	3
Carmen Cali	10	0	0	0	8.59	8
Rick Ankiel	5	1	0	0	5.40	9
Josh Pearce	3	0	0	0	3.86	0
Cody McKay	1	0	0	0	0.00	0

== NLDS ==
In three playoff rounds in 2004, Walker combined to hit .293/.379/.707 with a pair of home runs in each tournament, setting a franchise record for home runs hit by a left-handed batter in one postseason. Walker made his playoff debut with the Cardinals in Game 1 of the NLDS versus the Dodgers, homering twice and scoring four runs in an 8−3 Cardinals win. He became the first Cardinal with a multi-home run game in LDS play.

=== St. Louis Cardinals vs. Los Angeles Dodgers ===
St. Louis wins series, 3-1

Game	Score	Date
1	St. Louis 8, Los Angeles 3	October 5
2	St. Louis 8, Los Angeles 3	October 7
3	Los Angeles 2, St. Louis 0	October 9
4	St. Louis 6, Los Angeles 2	October 10

== NLCS ==
In Game of the 1 National League Championship Series (NLCS) versus the Houston Astros, Walker was a home run short of hitting for the cycle. The Cardinals proceeded to take a 2–0 Series lead before losing three straight in Houston. Returning home for Game 6, the Cardinals took a 4–3 lead into the ninth inning, but Houston tied it up. Jim Edmonds hit a walk-off homer in the bottom of the 12th to win the game. The next night, Albert Pujols helped St. Louis win Game 7 to clinch the series with a game tying hit. Scott Rolen brought him home on a two-run home run. Pujols was named the series MVP.

Game	Score	Date
1	St. Louis 10, Houston 7	October 13
2	St. Louis 6, Houston 4	October 14
3	Houston 5, St. Louis 2	October 16
4	Houston 6, St. Louis 5	October 17
5	Houston 3, St. Louis 0	October 18
6	St. Louis 6, Houston 4	October 20
7	St. Louis 5, Houston 2	October 21

== World Series ==
When the Cardinals reached the World Series, Tony La Russa became the sixth manager to win pennants in both leagues, following Joe McCarthy, Yogi Berra, Alvin Dark, and the managers in the 1984 World Series, Sparky Anderson and Dick Williams. La Russa had managed the Oakland Athletics to three straight pennants between 1988 and 1990 and winning the 1989 World Series. La Russa would try to join Anderson as the only men to have managed teams to World Series championships in both leagues. La Russa wore number 10 in tribute to Anderson (who wore 10 while manager of the Cincinnati Reds) and to indicate he was trying to win the team's tenth championship.

The Cardinals met a what was a potent Red Sox squad fresh off four straight victories over the Yankees following an 0–3 deficit in the ALCS. A comeback in this fashion in any North American major sports league had previously occurred only in the NHL. This was the third time the two teams have faced each other in the Fall Classic, with the Cardinals winning the previous two in 1946 and 1967. The Cardinals were again without a key player for the World Series: ace pitcher Chris Carpenter, who, after going 15–5, tweaked his shoulder in September and missed the entire post-season.

Making his World Series debut in Game 1, Walker collected four hits in five at bats with a home run and two doubles. His four-hit outing tied a Cardinals World Series record, becoming the seventh overall and first to so since Lou Brock in 1967, also against Boston.

The Cardinals were swept by the Red Sox in four games and struggled to hit, never taking a lead at any point in the series. Pujols, Rolen, and Edmonds, the normally fearsome 3-4-5 hitters for the Cardinals, were 6-for-45 with one RBI. The club batted .190 with a .562 OPS overall. Walker was one of very few exceptions, batting .357 with a 1.366 OPS. His two home runs accounted for the only two hit by the entire Cardinals team. In the 2004 postseason, Walker scored 21 percent (14 of 68) of Cardinals runs scored.

Game	Score	Date
1	Boston 11, St. Louis 9	October 23
2	Boston 6, St. Louis 2	October 24
3	Boston 4, St. Louis 1	October 26
4	Boston 3, St. Louis 0	October 27

== Awards and honors ==
- Pujols, Rolen, and Edmonds finished third, fourth and fifth in the MVP voting, eliciting the nickname MV3.
- La Russa finished second in the NL Manager of the Year voting.

=== Gold Gloves ===
- C: Mike Matheny
- 3B: Scott Rolen
- OF: Jim Edmonds

=== Silver Sluggers ===
- 1B: Albert Pujols
- OF: Jim Edmonds

=== NL Comeback Player of the Year ===
- (The Sporting News and Players' Choice Awards): Chris Carpenter

=== NLCS MVP ===
- Albert Pujols

== Farm system ==
Level	Team	League	Manager
AAA	Memphis Redbirds	Pacific Coast League	Danny Sheaffer
AA	Tennessee Smokies	Southern League	Mark DeJohn
A	Palm Beach Cardinals	Florida State League	Tom Nieto
A	Peoria Chiefs	Midwest League	Joe Cunningham, Jr.
A-Short Season	New Jersey Cardinals	New York–Penn League	Tommy Shields
Rookie	Johnson City Cardinals	Appalachian League	Tom Kidwell

LEAGUE CO-CHAMPIONS: Tennessee
