= List of Nippon Professional Baseball players (G) =

The following is a list of Nippon Professional Baseball players with the last name starting with G, retired or active.

== G ==
Name	Debut	Final Game	Position	Teams	Ref
Eddie Gaillard					
Claudio Galva					
Balvino Galvez					
Freddy García					
Karim García					
Shawn Gilbert					
Chris Gissell					
Brian Givens					
Gary Glover					
Ryan Glynn					
Shosei Go					
Anderson Gomes					
Leo Gomez					
Hiroshi Gondoh					
Dicky Gonzalez					
Geremi Gonzalez					
Luis Gonzalez					
Paul Gonzalez					
Yuji Goshima					
Richard Gossage					
Koji Gotoh					
Mitsutaka Gotoh born 1974					
Mitsutaka Gotoh born 1978					
Shinya Gotoh					
Taketoshi Gotoh					
Toshiyuki Gotoh					
Tsuguo Gotoh					
Jason Grabowski					
Franklyn Gracesqui					
Alex Graman					
Andy Green					
Mike Greenwell					
Seth Greisinger					
Kip Gross					
Aaron Guiel					
Mike Gulan					
Lindsay Gulin					
Rick Guttormson					
Antonio Guzman					
Domingo Guzman					
Marcus Gwyn					
