= Anderson Gomes =

Anderson Gomes may refer to:

- Anderson Gomes (baseball) (1985–2017), Brazilian baseball player
- Anderson Gomes (football manager) (born 1971), Brazilian football coach
