= John Jaha =

American baseball player (born 1966)

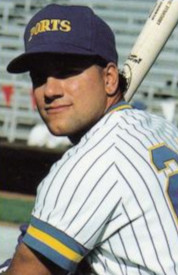
- Jaha with the Stockton Ports in 1988
- First baseman / Designated hitter
- Born: May 27, 1966 (age 59); Portland, Oregon, U.S.
- Batted: Right Threw: Right

MLB debut
- July 9, 1992, for the Milwaukee Brewers

Last MLB appearance
- June 27, 2001, for the Oakland Athletics

MLB statistics
- Batting average: .263
- Home runs: 141
- Runs batted in: 490
- Stats at Baseball Reference

Teams
- Milwaukee Brewers (1992–1998); Oakland Athletics (1999–2001)

Career highlights and awards
- All-Star (1999); Milwaukee Brewers Wall of Honor

John Emil Jaha (born May 27, 1966) is an American former professional baseball first baseman. He played in Major League Baseball (MLB) from 1992 to 2001 for the Milwaukee Brewers and Oakland Athletics, playing in both the American League and National League. He was elected to the American League All-Star team in 1999.

== Career ==
Jaha graduated from David Douglas High School in Portland, Oregon, in 1984. He still holds most offensive baseball records for the school.

The Milwaukee Brewers selected Jaha in the 1984 Major League Baseball draft and he made his Major League debut with the Brewers on July 9, 1992. He also had success playing with the Daikyo Dolphins in the Australian Baseball League in 1991 and 1992 alongside Brewers and 1999 All-Star teammate, Dave Nilsson. Earlier in 1992, while playing for Brewers Triple-A affiliate Denver, Jaha became only the second player (after Joey Meyer) to hit a ball into the upper deck at Mile High Stadium.

In 1996, Jaha enjoyed his finest season with the Brewers, batting .300 with 34 home runs and 118 RBI. Despite the strong season, he was not selected to the All-Star team, having to contend with Frank Thomas, Mark McGwire, and Mo Vaughn for the first base position.

After an injury-plagued Major League career with the Brewers, Jaha signed a minor-league contract with the Oakland Athletics in 1999. Although Jaha wasn't expected to make the team - in fact, he was left out of the team's media guide that spring - he turned in a remarkable comeback season. Earning his first All-Star berth along the way, he finished the season with 35 home runs (tying Dave Kingman for most by an Oakland designated hitter) and 111 RBIs and was named the American League Comeback Player of the Year. He would finish 18th in AL MVP voting.

It was his last season of significant productivity. Jaha played in just 33 games in 2000, fewer the following year. A popular figure in the Oakland Athletics clubhouse, he drew a standing ovation from his A's teammates when he announced his retirement on June 30, 2001. Jaha is of Syrian and Lebanese descent.

In 826 games over 10 seasons, Jaha posted a .263 batting average (730-for-2775) with 470 runs, 126 doubles, 5 triples, 141 home runs, 490 RBI, 36 stolen bases, 430 bases on balls, .369 on-base percentage and .465 slugging percentage. He finished his career with a .993 fielding percentage as a first baseman.
