= 1999 Major League Baseball All-Star Game =

1999 American baseball competition

	1	2	3	4	5	6	7	8	9	R	H	E
National League	0	0	1	0	0	0	0	0	0	1	7	1
American League	2	0	0	2	0	0	0	0	X	4	6	2
- Date: July 13, 1999
- Venue: Fenway Park
- City: Boston, Massachusetts
- Managers: Bruce Bochy (SD); Joe Torre (NYY)
- MVP: Pedro Martínez (BOS)
- Attendance: 34,187
- Ceremonial first pitch: Ted Williams
- Television: Fox (United States); MLB International (International)
- TV announcers: Joe Buck, Tim McCarver and Bob Brenly (Fox); Gary Thorne and Ken Singleton (MLB International)
- Radio: ESPN
- Radio announcers: Charley Steiner and Dave Campbell

The 1999 Major League Baseball All-Star Game was the 70th playing of the midsummer classic between the all-stars of the American League (AL) and National League (NL), the two leagues comprising Major League Baseball. The game was held on July 13, 1999, at Fenway Park in Boston, Massachusetts, the home of the Boston Red Sox of the American League.

Fenway Park was chosen as host because the owners at the time were planning to build a New Fenway Park in a few years but were unable to get the project off the ground in time for the game. The closing of Tiger Stadium in Detroit, Michigan, along with the move of the Milwaukee Brewers to the National League and the delay in the construction of Miller Park also played a role in the Red Sox being awarded the game.

The pre-game ceremonies featured introductions of nominees for the All-Century Team, including longtime Red Sox outfielder Ted Williams.

In two innings, AL starting pitcher Pedro Martínez struck out the first four batters of the National League, becoming the first pitcher in history to begin the All-Star Game striking out the side. In all he struck out five of the six batters he faced, earning him Game MVP honors, becoming the second player in All-Star Game history to be named MVP as a member of the host team. The game resulted in a win for the American League by the final score of 4–1. Starting with the 1999 All-Star Game, the games would always be held either on the 2nd or 3rd Tuesday of July, from 1999 to 2017, it was held between July 9 and July 16, and on July 17 in 2018.

== Rosters ==
Players in italics have since been inducted into the National Baseball Hall of Fame.

=== National League ===
Elected starters
Position	Player	Team	All-Star Games
C	Mike Piazza	Mets	7
1B	Mark McGwire	Cardinals	11
2B	Jay Bell	Diamondbacks	2
3B	Matt Williams	Diamondbacks	5
SS	Barry Larkin	Reds	10
OF	Tony Gwynn	Padres	15
OF	Sammy Sosa	Cubs	3
OF	Larry Walker	Rockies	4
DH	Jeff Bagwell	Astros	4

Pitchers
Position	Player	Team	All-Star Games
P	Andy Ashby	Padres	2
P	Kent Bottenfield	Cardinals	1
P	Paul Byrd	Phillies	1
P	Mike Hampton	Astros	1
P	Trevor Hoffman	Padres	2
P	Randy Johnson	Diamondbacks	6
P	José Lima	Astros	1
P	Kevin Millwood	Braves	1
P	Robb Nen	Giants	2
P	Curt Schilling	Phillies	3
P	Billy Wagner	Astros	1
P	Scott Williamson	Reds	1

Reserves
Position	Player	Team	All-Star Games
C	Mike Lieberthal	Phillies	1
C	Dave Nilsson	Brewers	1
1B	Sean Casey	Reds	1
2B	Jeff Kent	Giants	1
SS	Álex González	Marlins	1
3B	Ed Sprague	Pirates	1
OF	Jeromy Burnitz	Brewers	1
OF	Luis Gonzalez	Diamondbacks	1
OF	Vladimir Guerrero	Expos	1
OF	Brian Jordan	Braves	1
OF	Gary Sheffield	Dodgers	5

=== American League ===
Elected starters
Position	Player	Team	All-Star Games
C	Iván Rodríguez	Rangers	8
1B	Jim Thome	Indians	3
2B	Roberto Alomar	Indians	10
3B	Cal Ripken Jr.	Orioles	17
SS	Nomar Garciaparra	Red Sox	2
OF	Ken Griffey Jr.	Mariners	10
OF	Kenny Lofton	Indians	6
OF	Manny Ramírez	Indians	3
DH	Jose Canseco	Devil Rays	6

Pitchers
Position	Player	Team	All-Star Games
P	David Cone	Yankees	5
P	Roberto Hernández	Devil Rays	2
P	Pedro Martínez	Red Sox	4
P	Mike Mussina	Orioles	5
P	Charles Nagy	Indians	3
P	Troy Percival	Angels	3
P	Mariano Rivera	Yankees	2
P	José Rosado	Royals	2
P	John Wetteland	Rangers	3
P	Jeff Zimmerman	Rangers	1

Reserves
Position	Player	Team	All-Star Games
C	Brad Ausmus	Tigers	1
1B	Ron Coomer	Twins	1
2B	José Offerman	Red Sox	2
3B	Tony Fernández	Blue Jays	5
SS	Derek Jeter	Yankees	2
SS	Omar Vizquel	Indians	2
OF	Shawn Green	Blue Jays	1
OF	Magglio Ordóñez	White Sox	1
OF	B.J. Surhoff	Orioles	1
OF	Bernie Williams	Yankees	3
DH	Harold Baines	Orioles	6
DH	John Jaha	Athletics	1
DH	Rafael Palmeiro	Rangers	4

== Game ==
=== Umpires ===
Home Plate	Jim Evans (AL)
First Base	Terry Tata (NL)
Second Base	Dale Ford (AL)
Third Base	Ángel Hernández (NL)
Left Field	Mark Johnson (AL)
Right Field	Larry Vanover (NL)

This was the last All-Star Game with umpires from separate leagues. In 2000, Major League Baseball unified the umpiring staffs under its control. Five of the umpires in this game (Evans, Tata, Ford, Johnson, and Vanover) lost their jobs less than two months later as part of the 1999 Major League Umpires Association mass resignation. However, through an arbitration process, Vanover was rehired before the 2002 season.

=== Starting lineups ===
National League				American League			
Order	Player	Team	Position	Order	Player	Team	Position
1	Barry Larkin	Reds	SS	1	Kenny Lofton	Indians	LF
2	Larry Walker	Rockies	RF	2	Nomar Garciaparra	Red Sox	SS
3	Sammy Sosa	Cubs	CF	3	Ken Griffey Jr.	Mariners	CF
4	Mark McGwire	Cardinals	1B	4	Manny Ramírez	Indians	RF
5	Matt Williams	Diamondbacks	3B	5	Jim Thome	Indians	1B
6	Jeff Bagwell	Astros	DH	6	Cal Ripken Jr.	Orioles	3B
7	Mike Piazza	Mets	C	7	Rafael Palmeiro	Rangers	DH
8	Jeromy Burnitz	Brewers	LF	8	Iván Rodríguez	Rangers	C
9	Jay Bell	Diamondbacks	2B	9	Roberto Alomar	Indians	2B
	Curt Schilling	Phillies	P		Pedro Martínez	Red Sox	P

=== Game summary ===
Tuesday, July 13, 1999 8:30 pm (ET) at Fenway Park in Boston, Massachusetts
Team	1	2	3	4	5	6	7	8	9	R	H	E
National League	0	0	1	0	0	0	0	0	0	1	7	1
American League	2	0	0	2	0	0	0	0	X	4	6	2
WP: Pedro Martínez (1-0) LP: Curt Schilling (0-1) Sv: John Wetteland (1)

== Home Run Derby ==
Fenway Park, Boston—N.L. 39, A.L. 23
Player	Team	Home Runs
American League
Ken Griffey Jr.	Seattle	16
Nomar Garciaparra	Boston	2
B. J. Surhoff	Baltimore	2
Shawn Green	Toronto	2
John Jaha	Oakland	1
National League
Jeromy Burnitz	Milwaukee	14
Mark McGwire	St. Louis	16 *
Jeff Bagwell	Houston	6
Larry Walker	Colorado	2
Sammy Sosa	Chicago	1

- - eliminated in second round after hitting 13 HRs in the first round.

== Notes ==
- Both the American and National League Starting Pitchers would be on the Red Sox 2004 World Series Championship team.
- Tampa Bay Slugger Jose Canseco was selected by the fans as the starting DH for the American League, his first selection in 7 years. By the All Star Break he was leading the AL with 31 Home Runs but he injured his back days prior to the game. He was replaced by Rafael Palmeiro. Canseco was also unable to participate in the Home Run Derby.
- After The Moffatts sang "O Canada" and (Boston native) Donna Summer sang "The Star-Spangled Banner", Hall of Famer Ted Williams threw out the first pitch of the All-Star Game. Before throwing the first pitch he was announced at Fenway as the greatest hitter of all time. The post-anthem flyover was by Fighter Squadron 31 from NAS Oceana, while Camp Edwards provided the colors presentation. The outfield flag presentation was by the Lowell Police Department and the Middlesex County Sheriff's Office.
