= Jeromy Burnitz =

American baseball player (born 1969)

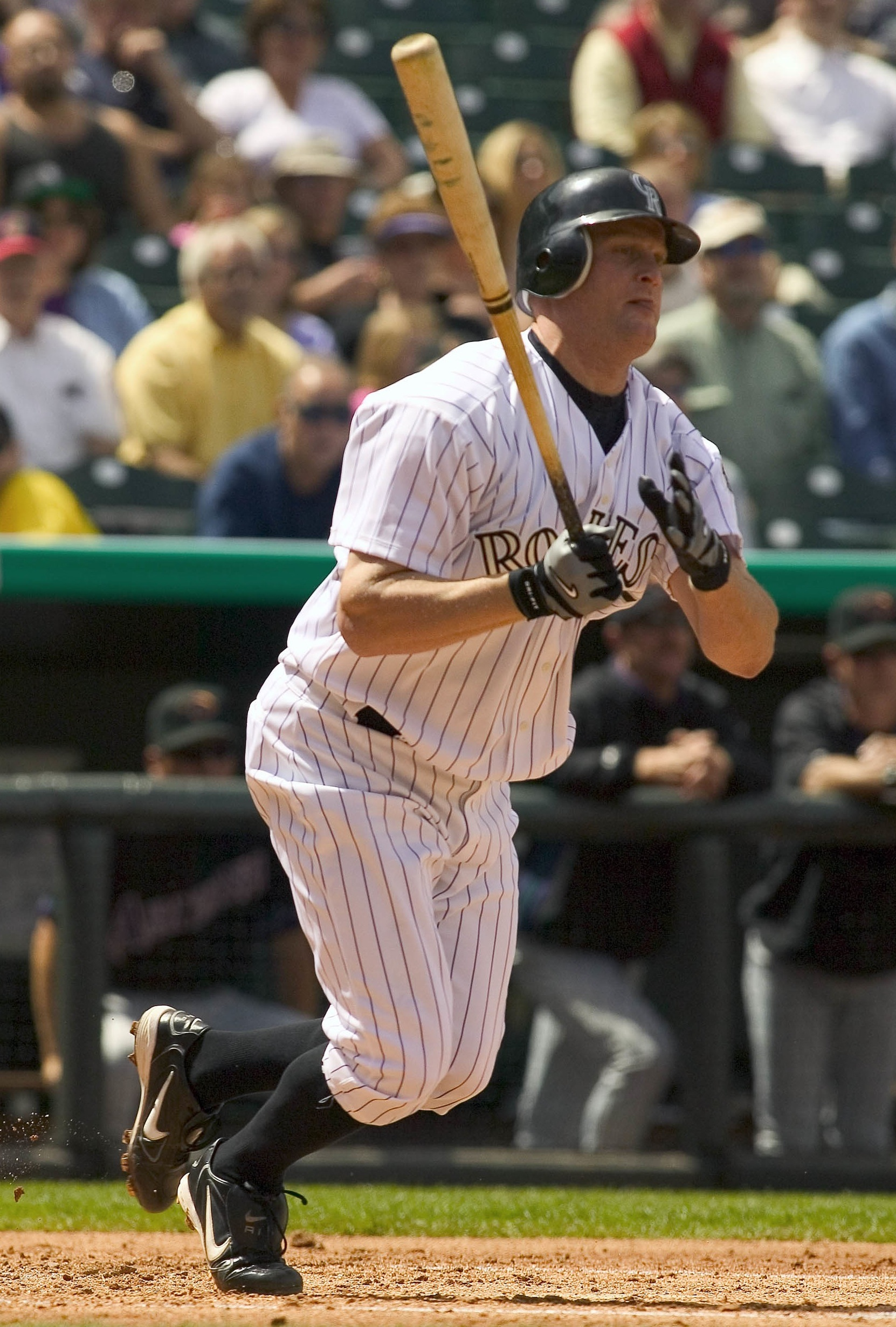
- Burnitz with the Colorado Rockies in 2004
- Right fielder
- Born: April 15, 1969 (age 57); Westminster, California, U.S.
- Batted: Left Threw: Right

MLB debut
- June 21, 1993, for the New York Mets

Last MLB appearance
- September 27, 2006, for the Pittsburgh Pirates

MLB statistics
- Batting average: .253
- Home runs: 315
- Runs batted in: 981
- Stats at Baseball Reference

Teams
- New York Mets (1993–1994); Cleveland Indians (1995–1996); Milwaukee Brewers (1996–2001); New York Mets (2002–2003); Los Angeles Dodgers (2003); Colorado Rockies (2004); Chicago Cubs (2005); Pittsburgh Pirates (2006)

Career highlights and awards
- All-Star (1999); Milwaukee Brewers Wall of Honor

Jeromy Neal Burnitz (/bɜːrˈnɪtz/ bur-NITZ; born April 15, 1969) is an American former professional baseball player. Burnitz was a right fielder in Major League Baseball who played with the New York Mets (1993–94, 2002–03), Cleveland Indians (1995–96), Milwaukee Brewers (1996–2001), Los Angeles Dodgers (2003), Colorado Rockies (2004), Chicago Cubs (2005), and Pittsburgh Pirates (2006).

== Early days ==
Burnitz played his collegiate ball at Oklahoma State University, and in 1988, played collegiate summer baseball in the Cape Cod Baseball League for the Hyannis Mets. He played minor league ball with the Welsh Waves, the Pittsfield Mets and the Buffalo Bisons.

== Career ==
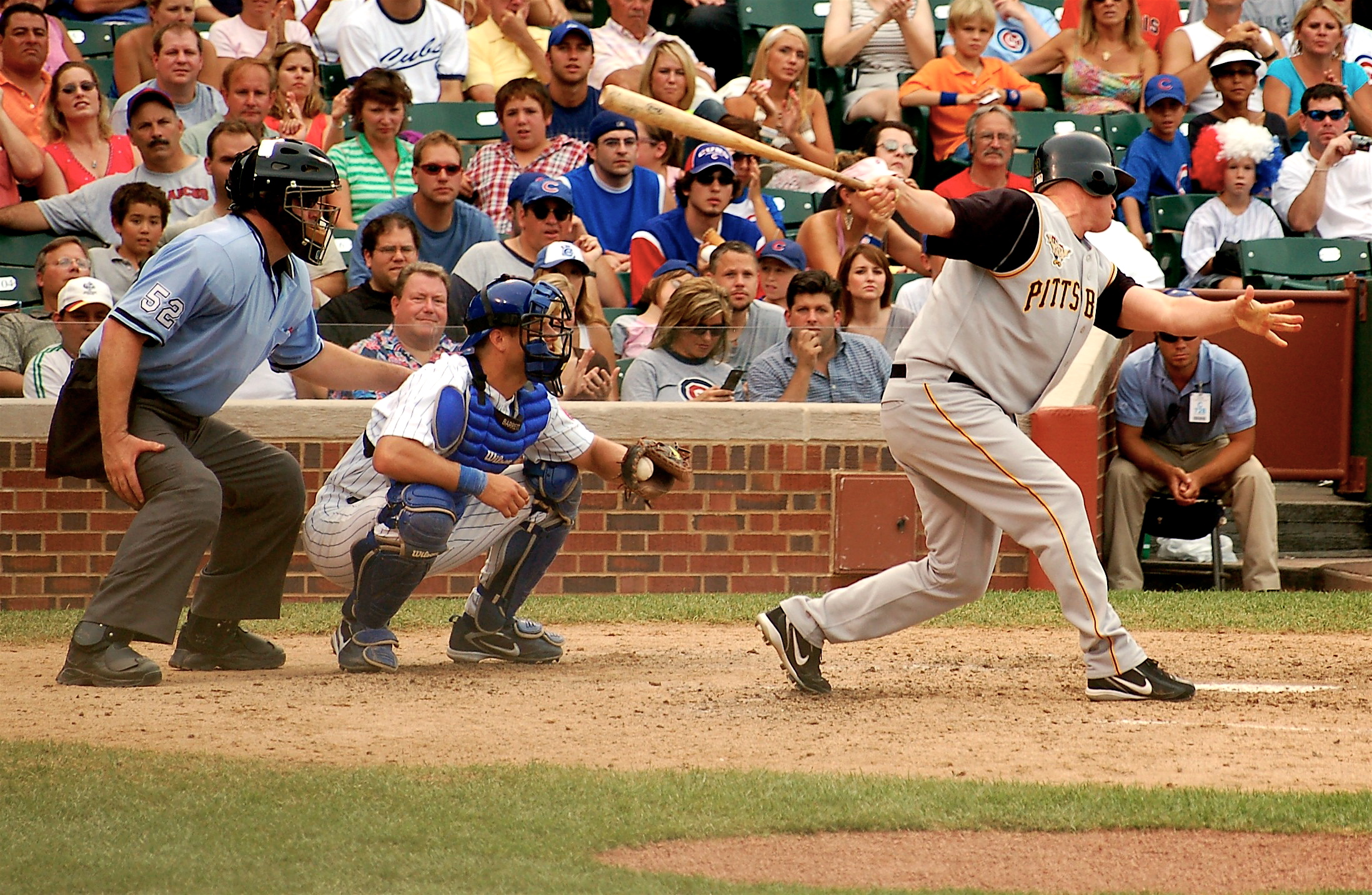
Burnitz bats for the Pirates, 2006

Burnitz was drafted in the first round of the 1990 draft by the New York Mets with the 17th overall selection. He made his major league debut in 1993. He exhibited both power and speed, but was traded by them to the Cleveland Indians. Burnitz never cracked the Cleveland lineup and it was only after his trade to Milwaukee in 1996 that he emerged as an everyday player.

The Milwaukee Brewers' last home run in 1997 was hit by Jeromy Burnitz, and it marked their last year in the AL. Burnitz was a fan favorite in Milwaukee, providing many of the only thrills during an otherwise low point in Brewers' history, their first years in the National League. He clubbed a career-high 38 home runs and 125 RBIs in 1998, and he played in the Major League Baseball All-Star Game in 1999. In 1999 he started the game, replacing the injured Tony Gwynn and became the first Brewer since Paul Molitor to start in the All-Star Game. After signing a contract extension with the Brewers in 2000, he was briefly the franchise's all-time highest paid player. On September 25, 2001, Burnitz and teammate Richie Sexson each hit three home runs in a 9–4 win against the Arizona Diamondbacks. It was the first, and, through the end of the 2024 season, only time that two players hit three home runs in the same game, let alone two teammates. In 2002, he returned to the Mets, but did not perform as well with his original team as both he and Mets fans hoped: his .215 batting average was the lowest among qualified batters. He was traded to Los Angeles in the Mets' 2003 purge of high-salaried players, and signed the following year with the Colorado Rockies.

In 2004, Burnitz signed with the Colorado Rockies, and became part of some rare home run displays. On April 27, he, rookie Matt Holliday, and Charles Johnson combined to slug back-to-back-to-back home runs against the Florida Marlins, the sixth such occasion in franchise history. In a May 18 game against the Cincinnati in which he hit two home runs, both were part of back-to-back home run sets with Holliday, making them the first teammates in franchise history to hit back-to-back home runs twice in the same game, and the first teammate duo to do so since Mike Cameron and Bret Boone of Seattle Mariners in 2002. In 150 games, he led the Rockies with 37 home runs, hit a career high .283, and was second on the team with 110 RBI. On February 2, 2005, the Cubs signed Burnitz to a one-year contract, the same day Sammy Sosa's trade to the Baltimore Orioles was finalized. He continued to hit well at Wrigley Field with a .258 average, 24 homers and 87 RBI in 160 games with the Cubs.

Burnitz was known as a good clubhouse man and a friendly, laid-back guy. During a slump in May 2006, he held an interview in order to apologize for failing to run out a grounder, then joked about the challenges that his team would face during the rest of the season, saying, "This is the first team I've been on in a couple years where I'm Joe High-Paid Free Agent. That, in and of itself, should tell you the big picture that the team's in."

== Personal life ==
Burnitz is married to Krissy Burnitz. They have three children together.

== See also ==
- List of Major League Baseball career home run leaders

== Sources ==
- The ESPN Baseball Encyclopedia – Gary Gillette, Peter Gammons, Pete Palmer. Publisher: Sterling Publishing, 2005. Format: Paperback, 1824pp. Language: English. ISBN 1-4027-4771-3

Preceded by Sammy Sosa	National League Player of the Month; June, 1999	Succeeded by Mark McGwire
