= Geremi González =

Venezuelan baseball player (1975–2008)

- Pitcher
- Born: January 8, 1975; Maracaibo, Venezuela
- Died: May 25, 2008 (aged 33); Maracaibo, Venezuela
- Batted: Right Threw: Right

Professional debut
- MLB: May 27, 1997, for the Chicago Cubs
- NPB: June 14, 2007, for the Yomiuri Giants

Last appearance
- MLB: September 26, 2006, for the Milwaukee Brewers
- NPB: July 7, 2007, for the Yomiuri Giants

MLB statistics
- Win–loss record: 30–35
- Earned run average: 4.93
- Strikeouts: 354

NPB statistics
- Win–loss record: 1–2
- Earned run average: 6.52
- Strikeouts: 17
- Stats at Baseball Reference

Teams
- Chicago Cubs (1997–1998); Tampa Bay Devil Rays (2003–2004); Boston Red Sox (2005); New York Mets (2006); Milwaukee Brewers (2006); Yomiuri Giants (2007)

Geremi Segundo González Acosta (January 8, 1975 – May 25, 2008) was a Venezuelan right-handed pitcher in Major League Baseball who played for the Chicago Cubs (1997–1998), Tampa Bay Devil Rays (2003–2004), Boston Red Sox (2005), New York Mets (2006) and Milwaukee Brewers (2006). In his rookie season he led the Cubs with 11 wins, but he was unable to continue that success in later seasons. He was known as Jeremi González until he was traded to the Brewers in 2006, at which time he informed the team of the proper spelling.

== Professional career ==
González was born in Maracaibo, Zulia State. The Cubs signed him as a non-draft amateur free agent in 1991, and he was a highly touted young arm in the Cubs system. He made his debut in 1997, posting a record of 11–9 and finishing ninth in voting for the National League's Rookie of the Year Award. He also pitched for the Cubs in 1998, then pitched in the minor leagues for nearly five years between three surgeries and a variety of injuries.

In 2003, he was rewarded by Tampa Bay with the Out of Nowhere Award. González ended up being the Rays' most consistent pitcher, despite his 6–11 record. He allowed three runs or fewer in 17 starts, but received the lowest run support of any AL East starter (3.91 runs per game). He finished with a 3.91 earned run average and 97 strikeouts in 156 innings. González was the pitcher on June 3, 2003, when Sammy Sosa was caught using a corked bat.

Early in the 2005 season, González started three games for the Boston Red Sox, going 1–1 with a 6.65 ERA. Boston optioned him to the Triple-A Pawtucket Red Sox in late May 2005, then recalled him to the major league club in early July to try to fill a hole in the back end of their bullpen. He appeared in Game 1 of the AL Division Series, a 14–2 loss to the Chicago White Sox, and allowed four runs in 2 1/3 innings, including a three-run home run by Scott Podsednik.

In 2006, González started three games for the Mets but performed poorly. During the season, he was traded to the Milwaukee Brewers in exchange for pitcher Mike Adams. González started five games for the Toronto Blue Jays Triple-A affiliate, the Syracuse Chiefs, in 2007, before being released.

In a six-season majors career, González posted a 30–35 record with 354 strikeouts and a 4.93 ERA in 131 appearances, including 83 starts, four complete games, two shutouts, and 572 2/3 innings pitched.

González is one of 583 pitchers to have faced Barry Bonds six or more times in his career and the only one of that group never to have allowed him to reach base.

On May 9, 2007, the Yomiuri Giants of Japan's Central League signed González. He became the fifth Venezuelan player to play in the JCL during the 2007 season, joining fellow countrymen Alex Cabrera, Darwin Cubillán, Luis González and Alex Ramírez.

== Death ==
González died after being struck by lightning in Maracaibo, Zulia on May 25, 2008.

== See also ==
- List of baseball players who died during their careers
- List of Major League Baseball players from Venezuela
