= Cody McKay =

Canadian baseball player (born 1974)

- McKay with the Sacramento River Cats in 2001
- Catcher
- Born: January 11, 1974 (age 52); Vancouver, British Columbia, Canada
- Batted: Left Threw: Right

MLB debut
- September 22, 2002, for the Oakland Athletics

Last MLB appearance
- October 2, 2004, for the St. Louis Cardinals

MLB statistics
- Batting average: .247
- Home runs: 0
- Runs batted in: 8
- Stats at Baseball Reference

Teams
- Oakland Athletics (2002); St. Louis Cardinals (2004)

Cody Dean McKay (born January 11, 1974) is a Canadian former Major League Baseball catcher who played for the Oakland Athletics in 2002 and for the St. Louis Cardinals in 2004.

== Biography ==
A native of Vancouver, British Columbia, McKay has lived his entire life in the US; he attended Horizon High School and Arizona State University. In 1994, he played collegiate summer baseball in the Cape Cod Baseball League for the Yarmouth-Dennis Red Sox.

McKay was twice drafted and not signed. First, by the San Francisco Giants in the 48th round of the 1992 Major League Baseball draft (1335th overall) and by the St. Louis Cardinals in the 5th round of the 1995 Major League Baseball draft (127th overall). He was drafted by the Oakland Athletics in the ninth round of the 1996 Major League Baseball draft (255th overall) and did sign.

He is the son of former player and Arizona Diamondbacks first base coach Dave McKay. On December 13, 2007, he was implicated for use of banned performance-enhancing substances on page 197 of the Mitchell Report.

== See also ==
- List of second-generation Major League Baseball players
