= Allan Simpson =

American baseball player (born 1977)

- Pitcher
- Born: August 26, 1977 (age 47); Springfield, Illinois, U.S.
- Batted: Right Threw: Right

MLB debut
- May 17, 2004, for the Colorado Rockies

Last MLB appearance
- June 6, 2006, for the Milwaukee Brewers

MLB statistics
- Win–loss record: 2–2
- Earned run average: 6.06
- Strikeouts: 57
- Stats at Baseball Reference

Teams
- Colorado Rockies (2004–2005); Cincinnati Reds (2005); Milwaukee Brewers (2006)

Larry Allan Simpson (born August 26, 1977) is a former baseball pitcher. Simpson pitched for the Philadelphia Phillies Double-A affiliate, the Reading Phillies in 2007. Simpson has pitched in the majors for the Cincinnati Reds, Colorado Rockies, and Milwaukee Brewers of Major League Baseball.

== Career ==
Simpson made his Major League debut on May 17, 2004. He played for the Colorado Rockies in 2004 and 2005, Cincinnati Reds in 2005, and Milwaukee Brewers in 2006. On July 7, 2008, Simpson signed a minor league contract with the Philadelphia Phillies. Simpson retired at the end of the season.
