= Choo Freeman =

American baseball player (born 1979)

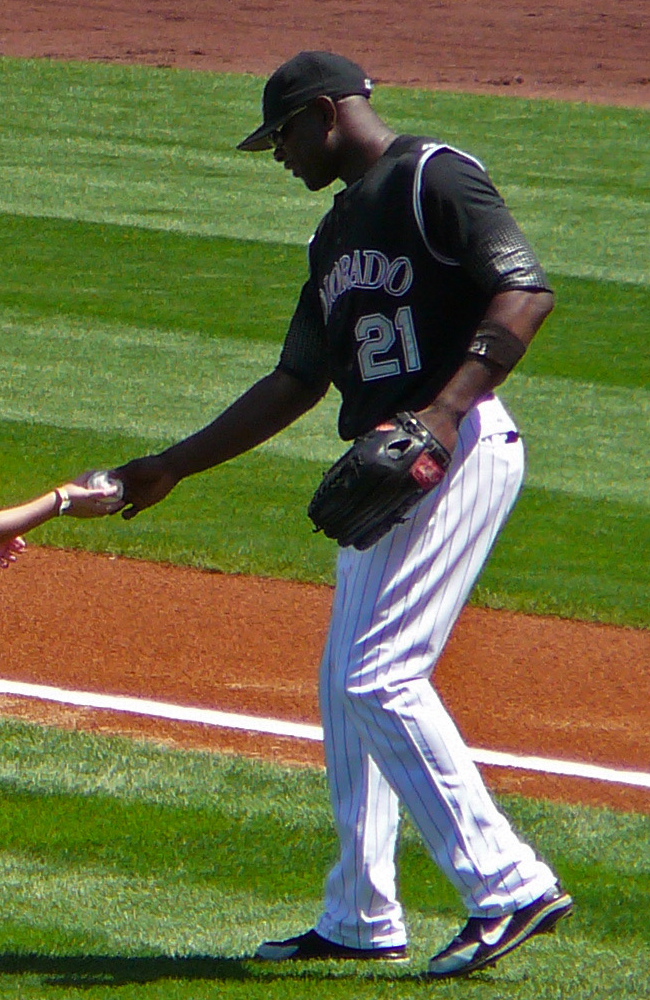
- Freeman with the Colorado Rockies in 2006
- Center fielder
- Born: October 20, 1979 (age 46); Pine Bluff, Arkansas, U.S.
- Batted: Right Threw: Right

MLB debut
- June 4, 2004, for the Colorado Rockies

Last MLB appearance
- September 30, 2006, for the Colorado Rockies

MLB statistics
- Batting average: .225
- Home runs: 3
- Runs batted in: 29
- Stats at Baseball Reference

Teams
- Colorado Rockies (2004–2006)

Raphael Deseption "Choo" Freeman (born October 20, 1979) is a retired Major League Baseball outfielder.

== Career ==
Freeman played American football in high school, setting a state record by catching 50 touchdowns for Dallas Christian High School in Mesquite, Texas, and being selected three times to the all-state team. In his overall athletic career at Dallas Christian, he helped the school win six state championships in various sports and signed with Texas A&M to play football, but chose baseball when he was selected by the Colorado Rockies in the first round of the 1998 Major League Baseball draft.

Freeman spent four years making his way through various entry-level Single-A minor league affiliates of the Rockies, even being selected as the Rockies' top prospect by Baseball America in 2000, before getting promoted to the Double-A Carolina Mudcats in 2002. With Carolina, he hit .291 with 12 home runs and 15 stolen bases and was selected as a "Southern League" All-Star causing his stock to rise in the organization.

In 2003, he found himself starting in center field for the Colorado Springs Sky Sox, the Rockies Triple-A affiliate, a position he would retain for most of the next couple of seasons. His best season with the Sky Sox was in 2004 where he hit .297 with 10 home runs and 50 RBI.

He made his major league debut with the Rockies on June 4, 2004, against the San Francisco Giants as a pinch hitter. He got his first two major league hits the next day in his first start for the Rockies, also against the Giants. However, he hit only .189 that season and wound up back with the Sky Sox in 2005.

After hitting .280 with the Sky Sox in 2005, Freeman rejoined the Rockies for limited action in September before making the team full-time for the 2006 season as a reserve outfielder. He hit .237 in the 88 games he played in during the 2006 season.

On February 2, 2007, Freeman was released by the Rockies.

On February 14, 2007, he signed a minor league contract with the Los Angeles Dodgers, but he failed to make the major league roster out of spring training and was reassigned to the Dodgers Triple-A affiliate, the Las Vegas 51s. He hit .270 in 121 games with the 51s and knocked in 48 runs, becoming a free agent after the season ended.

== Personal life ==
Freeman is a cousin fellow baseball player Torii Hunter. He married Jamie Freeman in 2010. In 2008 the couple had a daughter named Zailey He also has a son named Jalen Freeman.
