= Jorge Piedra =

American baseball player (born 1979)

- Outfielder
- Born: April 17, 1979 (age 46); Sun Valley, California, U.S.
- Batted: Left Threw: Left

MLB debut
- August 7, 2004, for the Colorado Rockies

Last MLB appearance
- August 10, 2006, for the Colorado Rockies

MLB statistics
- Batting average: .275
- Home runs: 12
- Runs batted in: 36
- Stats at Baseball Reference

Teams
- Colorado Rockies (2004–2006)

Jorge Moises Piedra (born April 17, 1979) is a former professional baseball outfielder. He played in Major League Baseball (MLB) for the Colorado Rockies from 2004 to 2006.

== Career ==
On April 11, 2005, Piedra became the second baseball player after Alex Sanchez to be suspended for testing positive for illegal performance-enhancing drugs under Major League Baseball's new drug policy. He was suspended for 10 days without pay, as MLB's policy dictated for a first offense until November 2005. First offenses since that time now result in 80-game suspensions.

He signed a minor league contract with the Oakland Athletics on June 12, 2007.

On January 4, 2008, Piedra signed a minor league contract with the Florida Marlins with an invitation to spring training. He was released on March 9.

== See also ==
- List of sportspeople sanctioned for doping offences
