= Jason Christiansen =

American baseball player (born 1969)

- Pitcher
- Born: September 21, 1969 (age 55); Omaha, Nebraska, U.S.
- Batted: Right Threw: Left

MLB debut
- April 26, 1995, for the Pittsburgh Pirates

Last MLB appearance
- October 1, 2005, for the Los Angeles Angels of Anaheim

MLB statistics
- Win–loss record: 27–26
- Earned run average: 4.30
- Strikeouts: 384
- Stats at Baseball Reference

Teams
- Pittsburgh Pirates (1995–2000); St. Louis Cardinals (2000–2001); San Francisco Giants (2001–2005); Los Angeles Angels of Anaheim (2005)

Jason Samuel Christiansen (born September 21, 1969) is an American former Major League Baseball left-handed relief pitcher.

== Biography ==
Christiansen was born in Omaha, Nebraska and attended Elkhorn High School. He is an alumnus of Cameron University. He was signed by the Pittsburgh Pirates as an amateur free agent in 1991, Christiansen made his Major League Baseball debut with the Pirates on April 26, 1995.

Christiansen gained national attention for his heated rivalry with fellow San Francisco Giants teammate Barry Bonds during the 2005 season. The rivalry was documented in the 2006 book Game of Shadows. Christiansen was traded to the Los Angeles Angels of Anaheim on August 30, 2005, for minor league pitchers Dusty Bergman and Ronnie Ray.

On December 13, 2007, he was named in the Mitchell Report to the Commissioner of Baseball of an Independent Investigation Into the Illegal Use of Steroids and Other Performance Enhancing Substances by Players in Major League Baseball.

Christiansen is the CEO & co-Owner of Rigid Industries LED Lighting, Inc., a manufacturer of high end LED lighting systems.

== See also ==
- List of Major League Baseball players named in the Mitchell Report
