= Brian Lawrence =

American baseball player (born 1976)

- Pitcher
- Born: May 14, 1976 (age 50); Fort Collins, Colorado, U.S.
- Batted: Right Threw: Right

MLB debut
- April 15, 2001, for the San Diego Padres

Last MLB appearance
- September 17, 2007, for the New York Mets

MLB statistics
- Win–loss record: 50–63
- Earned run average: 4.19
- Strikeouts: 597
- Stats at Baseball Reference

Teams
- San Diego Padres (2001–2005); New York Mets (2007)

Brian Michael Lawrence (born May 14, 1976) is an American former professional baseball starting pitcher. He played in Major League Baseball (MLB) for the San Diego Padres and New York Mets. He is currently the pitching coach of the South Bend Cubs, a Class A affiliate of the Chicago Cubs.

== High school ==
Lawrence attended Carthage High School in Carthage, Texas. His senior year (1994) under head coach Scott Lee, he led the Bulldogs to the final four State Semi-Final game in Austin versus the Belton Tigers of Bell County, losing the game 9–5 on a walk-off grand-slam given up by his relief pitcher.

== College ==
Lawrence attended Northwestern State University in Natchitoches, Louisiana.

== Professional career ==
=== San Diego Padres ===
In the 1998 Major League Baseball draft, the San Diego Padres selected Lawrence in the 17th round. After spending the rest of that year at the Rookie League and Class A Short Season levels of the Padres' organization, he played a full season in 1999 with the Class A-Advanced Rancho Cucamonga Quakes, finishing with a 12–8 record and a 3.39 earned run average (ERA). During the 2000 season, Lawrence split time between the Double-A Mobile BayBears and the Triple-A Las Vegas Stars.

At the end of the 2001 season, Lawrence made his major-league debut for the Padres. He ended up going 5–5 with a 3.45 ERA in 27 games (15 starts). The 2001 season was the only one in which the Padres used him extensively in a relief role. By 2002, he had established himself in the Padres' starting rotation, and he made at least 31 starts with the Padres in each of the next four seasons. On June 12, 2002, Lawrence struck out all three batters on nine total pitches in the third inning of a 2–0 win over the Baltimore Orioles; he became the 24th National League pitcher and the 33rd pitcher in major-league history to accomplish an immaculate inning. For three consecutive years, 2002–2004, he logged more than 200 innings pitched, and he won at least 10 games in each of those seasons. However, in 2005, his record was just 7–15, and his ERA was 4.83—his highest ERA in the majors. He threw the slowest fastball of all NL starters in 2005, averaging 83.3 miles per hour (134.1 km/h).

=== Washington Nationals ===
After the 2005 season, the Padres traded Lawrence to the Washington Nationals for third baseman Vinny Castilla. Following the trade to the Nationals, Padres General Manager Kevin Towers was quoted as saying "Brian Lawrence was an effective low cost innings-eater". The righty would never have an opportunity to pitch for the Nationals. On the second day of spring training for the 2006 season, team doctors discovered a torn labrum and a torn rotator cuff in his right shoulder, which put him on the disabled list for all of 2006. After the 2006 season, the Nationals declined their 2007 option on Lawrence.

=== Colorado Rockies ===
On January 21, 2007, Lawrence was signed by the Colorado Rockies, but was released early in the season.

=== New York Mets ===
On May 6, 2007, Lawrence signed a minor league contract with the New York Mets. The Mets assigned him to their Triple-A affiliate, the New Orleans Zephyrs. On August 2, 2007, Lawrence was called up to the major leagues, and started his first game with the Mets against the Milwaukee Brewers. His victory in Milwaukee was his first major league win in almost 2 years. He was designated for assignment on September 18, 2007. Lawrence made six starts for the Mets and posted a 6.83 ERA. Lawrence opted for free agency after the season.

=== Kansas City Royals ===
On January 19, 2008, the Kansas City Royals signed Lawrence to a minor league contract with an invitation to spring training, he was released from the team on March 27, 2008.

=== Camden Riversharks ===
On April 24, 2008, Lawrence signed with the Camden Riversharks of the Atlantic League.

=== Atlanta Braves ===
On June 8, the Atlanta Braves bought Lawrence's contract from Camden and assigned him to Triple-A Richmond. He became a free agent at the end of the season.

=== Orange County Flyers ===
He joined the independent Orange County Flyers of the Golden Baseball League under first-year manager Phil Nevin in 2009. In his Flyers debut, he threw a complete game one-hitter (doubleheader games in the minors are 7 innings).

=== Return to the Padres ===
The San Diego Padres purchased his contract from the Flyers on June 15, 2009 and sent him to Triple-A. The Padres released Lawrence on August 1, 2009.

=== Florida Marlins ===
On August 18, 2009, Lawrence signed a minor league contract with the Florida Marlins. His contract expired at the end of the season. Lawrence re-signed a minor league contract with the Marlins on April 1, 2010.

=== San Francisco Giants ===
Lawrence signed with the San Francisco Giants on February 14, 2011, but he was released before the 2011 season on April 1.

=== Los Angeles Angels of Anaheim ===
He signed with the Los Angeles Angels of Anaheim on April 17. However, he retired on June 2 after going 2–5 with an 8.07 ERA for the Triple-A Salt Lake Bees of the Pacific Coast League.

=== Coaching career ===
Year	Position	Team	League	MLB Affiliate
2012	Pitchers	Normal CornBelters	Frontier League	Independent
2013	Pitchers	Lake Elsinore Storm	California League	San Diego Padres
2014	Pitchers	Boise Hawks	Pioneer League	Independent
2015	Pitchers	South Bend Cubs	Midwest League	Chicago Cubs
2016	Pitchers	Eugene Emeralds	Northwest League	San Francisco Giants
2017	Pitchers	South Bend Cubs	Midwest League	Chicago Cubs
2018	Pitchers	South Bend Cubs	Midwest League	Chicago Cubs
2019	Pitchers	Myrtle Beach Pelicans	Carolina League	Chicago Cubs
