= Shawn Chacón =

American baseball player (born 1977)

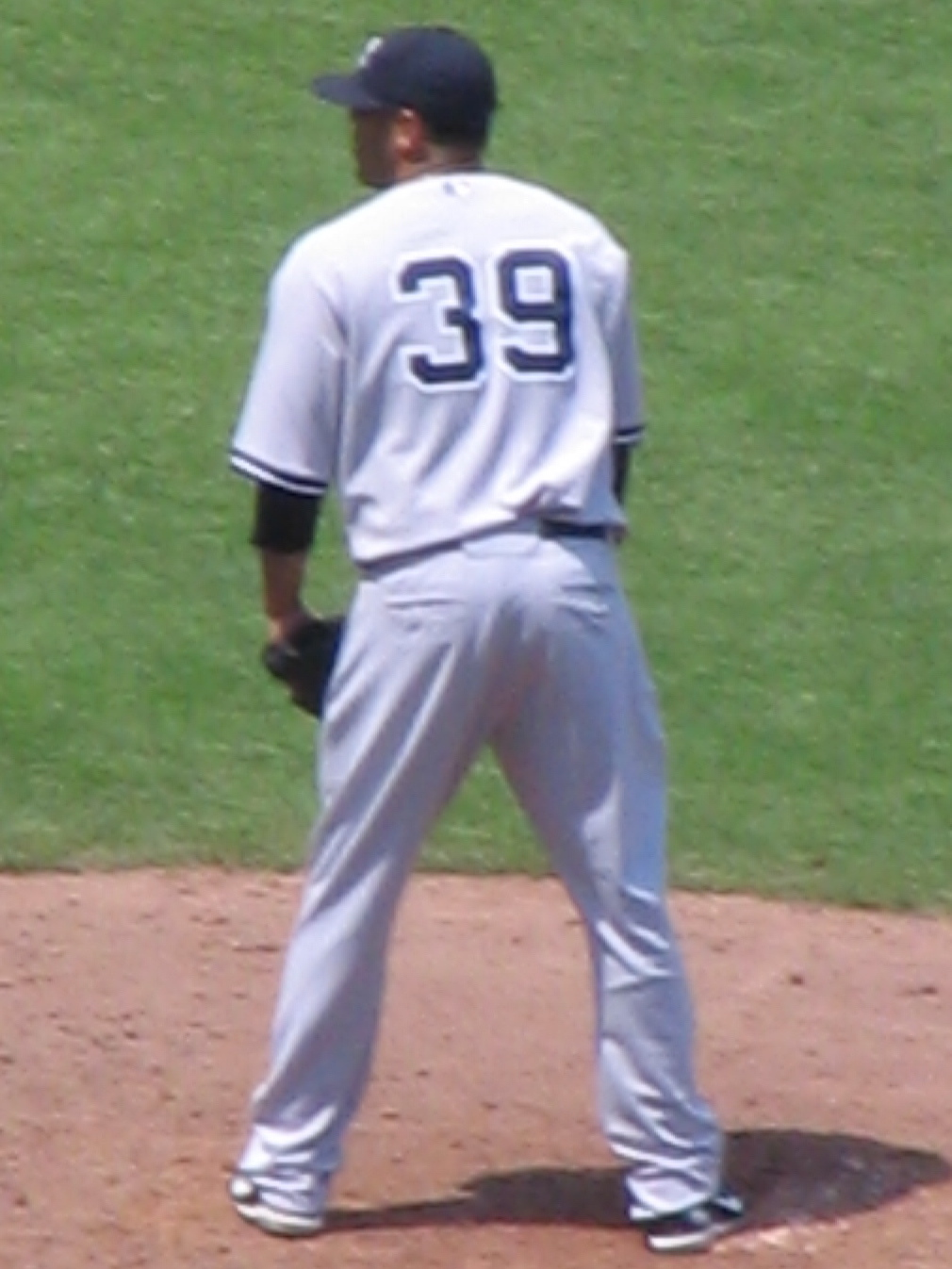
- Chacón with the New York Yankees in 2006
- Pitcher
- Born: December 23, 1977 (age 48); Anchorage, Alaska, U.S.
- Batted: Right Threw: Right

MLB debut
- April 29, 2001, for the Colorado Rockies

Last MLB appearance
- June 19, 2008, for the Houston Astros

MLB statistics
- Win–loss record: 45–61
- Earned run average: 4.99
- Strikeouts: 619
- Stats at Baseball Reference

Teams
- Colorado Rockies (2001–2005); New York Yankees (2005–2006); Pittsburgh Pirates (2006–2007); Houston Astros (2008)

Career highlights and awards
- All-Star (2003)

Shawn Anthony Chacón (born December 23, 1977) is an American former professional baseball pitcher, who is currently the manager of the Trenton Thunder of the MLB Draft League. He played in Major League Baseball (MLB) for the Colorado Rockies, New York Yankees, Pittsburgh Pirates, and Houston Astros. During his career, he threw an 88–92 mph sinker, a big curveball, a slider, and a changeup.

== Early years ==
Chacón was born in Anchorage, Alaska, but has only a dim recollection of his biological mother and none of his father. He believes his biological father was African-American and his mother was Hispanic. His mother placed him in a Greeley, Colorado foster home when he was aged four, and he was adopted by Tony and Blanca Chacón. Chacón was recruited by Arizona State, but chose to play professionally after he was drafted by the Colorado Rockies in the third round of the 1996 amateur draft. He signed on June 18, 1996.

== Professional career ==
=== Colorado Rockies ===
Chacón made his MLB debut in 2001 as a member of the Rockies. In his first start, Chacon allowed seven runs in 5 1/3 innings while striking out eight en route to a 14–7 win. By the end of the 2001 season, Chacón made 27 starts and recorded a record of 6-10 for the Rockies.

In 2002, Chacón battled inconsistency and injuries throughout the season. He pitched in 13 starts in the first half, going 3-6 while having a stint on the DL. Once he returned, his season took a turn for the worse. In the second half he amassed an ERA of 7.00 in eight starts and was demoted to AAA. Chacón never was recalled back to the majors and finished the season with a record of 5-11 while walking 60 batters in 119 innings.

Chacón was Colorado's 2003 All-Star representative, having won 11 games before the All Star break; the only other Rockies pitchers to have done so through 2015 are Aaron Cook (2008), Jason Marquis (2009), and Ubaldo Jiménez (2010). He never got to pitch in the All-Star game due to a nagging elbow injury. He returned after the All-Star break and was winless in six starts, going 0–4. Chacon was then shut down for the rest of the season. He wound up finishing 11–8 with a 4.60 ERA.

The next year, due to a necessity at the closer role, he was converted into the Rockies closer for the 2004 season. Chacón put up one of the most bizarre stat lines in baseball history for a closer. Chacón was ninth in the National League with 35 saves but was also tied with a league leading nine blown saves. His record was 1–9 and his ERA 7.11. His home/road splits were even odder, as he was 1–5 at home with a 6.81 ERA and 20 saves. He allowed more hits than innings pitched, and while on the road his ERA was even worse, standing at 7.56 and notching only 15 saves. In 2005, Chacón was 1–7 with a career low 4.09 through 13 games before being traded mid season to the Yankees, ending his five-year tenure with the Rockies. A few months prior to the trade, Chacon told a sports reporter that nobody wanted to pitch at high altitude Coors Field because the ball would not curve in the light air. After Chacon went to the Yankees, Rockies manager Hurdle said that a player unhappy with the Rockies would leave quickly. He finished 24–45 in 150 games with 35 saves for the Rockies.

=== New York Yankees ===
The Rockies traded Chacón to the New York Yankees in July 2005 for minor league pitchers Ramón Ramírez and Eduardo Sierra. Many New York fans and members of the tough New York media criticized the trade, calling it a bandage and not a solution, much like how the Yankees saw starts from Tim Redding, Darrell May and Sean Henn in 2005. Chacón was excited to be coming to New York, and he did not waver under the initial pressure and criticism. In his first start as a Yankee, he pitched six innings without allowing an earned run against the Los Angeles Angels of Anaheim. He finished 7–3 with a 2.85 ERA for the Yankees. Chacón made his postseason debut in Game 4 of the 2005 American League Division Series against the Los Angeles Angels of Anaheim. He pitched 6⅓ innings and allowed just 2 runs in a Yankee win.

Before the 2006 season, sportswriters thought that Chacón would be a big key to the Yankee rotation. Chacón, however, got off to a slow start, but started pitching well in late April. On May 16, the Texas Rangers scored 7 runs off Chacón. After the terrible start, Chacón went on the 15-day disabled list. Chacón came off the DL on June 11. After coming off the DL, Chacón could not pitch 5 innings, forcing the Yankees to use their tired bullpen. On July 6, Chacón was sent to the bullpen after giving up seven runs in 1⅓ innings against the Cleveland Indians on July 4. He was replaced in the rotation by Kris Wilson.

=== Pittsburgh Pirates ===
During the July 31, 2006, mid-season non-waiver trade deadline, Chacon was dealt for Craig Wilson. Chacón started for the Pirates, making nine starts and going 2–3 with a 5.48 ERA.

In 2007, Chacón was mainly used as a reliever by the Pirates, but also made four starts. He went 5–4 with a 3.94 ERA in 64 games for the Pirates in 2007. Chacón was granted free agency after the season.

=== Houston Astros ===
On February 20, 2008, Chacón signed a one-year deal with the Houston Astros worth $2 million. On May 16, Chacón set a major league record by recording 9 consecutive no-decisions to begin a season.

On June 25, 2008, the Astros announced that Chacón was suspended indefinitely for insubordination after a physical altercation with Astros General Manager Ed Wade. The incident began after Chacón repeatedly refused to leave the team dining room to speak with Wade in his office. Chacón claimed that Wade raised his voice and verbally attacked him, telling him to "look in the mirror", though Wade has denied raising his voice or verbally attacking Chacón. In a fit of rage Chacón grabbed the much smaller Wade by the neck and threw him to the ground. When Wade tried to get up Chacón repeatedly knocked him back down before other players could intervene to stop the assault. On whether he regretted the incident Chacón stated "If there's any regret, I just wish they had just let me alone". Wade was not injured by the assault. The next day, Chacón was placed on waivers by the Astros and after clearing waivers, his contract was terminated with cause, meaning that Chacón forfeited $983,607 in salary (this move was appealed by the MLB Players' Association, but the termination with cause was upheld by an arbitrator in August 2010). Chacón did not pitch again in 2008.

=== Newark Bears/Oakland Athletics ===
On May 1, 2009, Chacón signed a one-year deal with the Newark Bears of the Atlantic League and started seven games, pitching to a 4.29 ERA with a 3–3 record. His performance with the Bears earned him a minor league contract with the Oakland Athletics organization on June 18, 2009. Pitching for the Triple-A Sacramento River Cats, went 8–4 in 14 appearances (12 starts) with an ERA of 6.29.

== Coaching career ==
Chacón joined the Trenton Thunder of the MLB Draft League as their pitching in 2022 and stayed in that position until being promoted to the manager of the Thunder in 2025.

== Legal troubles ==
On October 5, 2009, Chacón was arrested at a bowling alley in Greeley, Colorado, on charges related to unpaid gambling markers in Las Vegas, Nevada. He faced a felony charge in connection with three bad checks written for $50,000 to Caesars Palace. He was released from jail on October 6, after Las Vegas authorities decided not to extradite him.
