= Tim Harikkala =

American baseball player (born 1971)

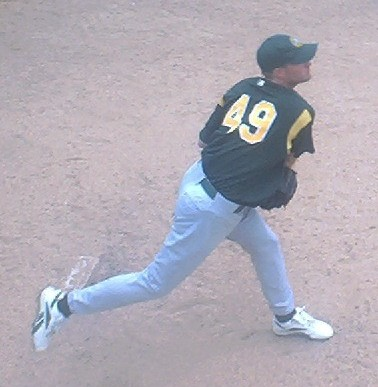
- Harikkala with the Oakland Athletics in 2005
- Pitcher
- Born: July 15, 1971 (age 54); Lake Worth, Florida, U.S.
- Batted: Right Threw: Right

Professional debut
- MLB: May 27, 1995, for the Seattle Mariners
- KBO: July 22, 2005, for the Samsung Lions

Last appearance
- KBO: July 4, 2007, for the LG Twins
- MLB: August 12, 2007, for the Colorado Rockies

MLB statistics
- Win–loss record: 7–8
- Earned run average: 5.98
- Strikeouts: 48

KBO statistics
- Win–loss record: 21–17
- Earned run average: 3.99
- Strikeouts: 125
- Stats at Baseball Reference

Teams
- Seattle Mariners (1995–1996); Boston Red Sox (1999); Colorado Rockies (2004); Oakland Athletics (2005); Samsung Lions (2005–2006); LG Twins (2007); Colorado Rockies (2007)

Timothy Allan Harikkala (born July 15, 1971) is an American former professional baseball pitcher. He pitched for four teams in Major League Baseball (MLB) from 1995 to 2007. He also pitched in the KBO League from 2005 to 2007.

== Career ==
Harikkala attended Palm Beach Community College then Florida Atlantic University, where he played baseball for the Owls under head coach Kevin Cooney.

The Seattle Mariners selected Harikkala in the 34th round of the 1992 Major League Baseball (MLB) draft. He was named the Mariners Minor League Pitcher of the Year in 1994. He made his MLB debut with Seattle on May 27, 1995. In both 1995 and 1996, he pitched in one game in the majors for the Mariners, making his first MLB start in 1996. He allowed 11 runs in 7 2/3 innings with Seattle. He signed with the Boston Red Sox after the 1998 season, pitching in 7 games in the 1999 season. Harikkala remained in the minors, starting the 2003 season in the Mexican League, until returning with the Colorado Rockies in 2004. He retired the first 22 batters he faced, a franchise record. He pitched in a career-high 55 games that season, with a 6–6 record and 4.74 ERA.

He played for Samsung Lions and LG Twins in the KBO League from 2005 to 2007.

He would make 71 major league relief appearances before making his second major league start for the Colorado Rockies on August 12, 2007. With 4,021 days passing between these two starts, Harikkala holds the MLB record for time elapsed between two starts. That was his only MLB game of the season.

Harikkala pitched for the York Revolution of the independent Atlantic League in 2009 and 2010.

Harikkala later played in the Baseball Finnish Championship Series for the Espoo Expos, winning a championship in 2015 and playing with the team through 2023. Harikkala's parents are from Finland.

Harikkala has spent time after his pro baseball career playing for the Hortonville Stars of the Dairyland League in Hortonville, Wisconsin.

Harikkala began coaching high school baseball in Wisconsin in 2010. He was named the head coach at Xavier High School in Appleton in August 2016.
