= Anderson Gomes (baseball) =

Brazilian baseball player

- Outfielder
- Born: March 12, 1985; Assaí, Paraná, Brazil
- Died: May 12, 2017 (aged 32)
- Batted: Right Threw: Right

Anderson Gomes dos Santos (born March 12, 1985 – May 12, 2017) was a Brazilian professional baseball player.

== Career ==
Gomes was signed by the Fukuoka Daiei Hawks as a pitcher. He never made it to Nippon Pro Baseball, as an arm injury ended his pitching career. The Hawks released him in 2005.

Gomes became an outfielder and was then signed by the Chicago White Sox. He split 2006 between the Kannapolis Intimidators (.250/.312/.382 in 80 games) and the Winston-Salem Warthogs (.205/.291/.348 in 34 games). He was picked for the All-Star Futures Game.

Gomes batted .300/.370/.442 in 79 games in 2007 for Kannapolis. Had he qualified, he would have ranked 4th in the Carolina League in batting average. He was 3 for 10 with 2 doubles, 2 walks, 2 steals, a run and a RBI in the 2007 Pan American Games to lead the host team in slugging percentage.
