= Luis González (infielder) =

Venezuelan baseball player (born 1979)

- Infielder
- Born: June 26, 1979 (age 47); Maracay, Venezuela
- Batted: Right Threw: Right

MLB debut
- April 6, 2004, for the Colorado Rockies

Last MLB appearance
- August 29, 2006, for the Colorado Rockies

MLB statistics
- Batting average: .283
- Home runs: 23
- Runs batted in: 98
- Stats at Baseball Reference

Teams
- Colorado Rockies (2004–2006); Yomiuri Giants (2007–2008)

Luis Alberto González (born June 26, 1979) is a Venezuelan former infielder in Major League Baseball. He played for the Colorado Rockies from 2004 to 2006 and for the Yomiuri Giants of the Japan's Central League from 2007-2008.

== Career ==
González made his debut in the 2004 season. On April 6, facing Randy Johnson and the Arizona Diamondbacks in the season opener for both teams, González went 2-for-5, including one home run and two RBI, and the Rockies topped Arizona 5–2.

González became the fifth Venezuelan player to play in the JCL during the 2007 season, joining fellow countrymen Alex Cabrera, Darwin Cubillán, Geremi González and Alex Ramírez.

On May 26, 2008, it was reported that González had violated the anti-doping policy in Nippon Professional Baseball, resulting in a one-year ban. The Yomiuri Giants released him after the incident.

On December 31, 2008, González signed a minor-league deal with the Colorado Rockies.

== See also ==
- List of Major League Baseball players from Venezuela
