= Chris Gissell =

American baseball player (born 1978)

- Pitcher
- Born: January 4, 1978 (age 48); Tacoma, Washington
- Batted: Right Threw: Right

Professional debut
- MLB: August 22, 2004, for the Colorado Rockies
- NPB: May 24, 2006, for the Seibu Lions
- CPBL: March 29, 2009, for the Uni-President 7-Eleven Lions

Last appearance
- MLB: September 26, 2004, for the Colorado Rockies
- NPB: August 16, 2007, for the Seibu Lions
- CPBL: August 13, 2009, for the Uni-President 7-Eleven Lions

MLB statistics
- Win–loss record: 0–1
- Earned run average: 14.54
- Strikeouts: 11

NPB statistics
- Win–loss record: 7–13
- Earned run average: 4.47
- Strikeouts: 141

CPBL statistics
- Win–loss record: 4–5
- Earned run average: 4.48
- Strikeouts: 61
- Stats at Baseball Reference

Teams
- Colorado Rockies (2004); Seibu Lions (2006–2007); Uni-President 7-Eleven Lions (2009)

Career highlights and awards
- Taiwan Series champion (2009)

Christopher Odell Gissell (born January 4, 1978) is an American retired professional baseball player. A pitcher, he played in Major League Baseball, Nippon Professional Baseball, and the Chinese Professional Baseball League.

== Career ==
Gissell graduated from Hudson's Bay High School in Vancouver, Washington. He was named the Washington State High School Player of the Year following his senior season. He entered the 1996 Major League Baseball draft and the Chicago Cubs selected him in the 4th round as the 112th overall pick.

From 1996 to 2002, Gissell played in the Cubs minor league system, reaching Triple-A in 2002 and never played for the Cubs. Gissell was primarily a starter, with a few relief appearances here and there. He became a minor league free agent after the 2002 season.

On November 7, 2002, he signed a minor league contract with the Houston Astros that included an invitation to spring training. After being reassigned to minor league camp on March 14, 2003, he was cut 15 days later by the Astros on March 29. The Colorado Rockies then signed him to a minor league contract on April 3, 2003. He would then go on to spend the whole season with the Triple-A Colorado Springs Sky Sox, posting an 8-4 record with a 3.55 ERA in 38 games that included 10 starts. On August 2, 2003, Gissell combined with Jesus Sanchez to throw a no-hitter for the Sky Sox against the Nashville Sounds, 3-0, at Herschel Greer Stadium in Nashville (Gissell 7 IP, Sanchez 2 IP). On October 15, 2003, he became a minor league free agent. On December 19, 2003, he signed a minor league contract with the San Francisco Giants that included an invitation to Spring training. He did not make the major league club and was sent to Triple-A Fresno. The Giants released him on April 7, 2004, without ever getting into a game for the Grizzlies.

A month later, on May 12, 2004, the Rockies signed him again to a minor league contract and sent him to Triple-A. He posted an excellent season for the Sky Sox, leading the Pacific Coast League with 14 wins, despite making 16 relief appearances and only 8 starts. His contract was purchased by the Rockies on August 19, 2004. On August 22, 2004, he made his major league debut against the Montreal Expos. He pitched 2 innings in relief, giving up a solo home run only to Juan Rivera. After making another relief appearance, he was optioned to Triple-A on August 27, 2004. He would be called up again in September on the 7th when rosters expanded and finished out the season with the Rockies. He ended up pitching in 5 games, made 1 start, and had a 0-1 record with a 14.54 ERA. Gissell became a free agent after the season.

On January 12, 2005, Gissell signed a minor league contract with an invitation to Spring training with the St. Louis Cardinals. He did not make the team and was assigned to Triple-A Memphis, where he spent the entire 2005 season. Pitching in 23 games (all starts), he had an 8-8 record with a 3.54 ERA. After the season, he became a free agent and from there went to play baseball in Japan.

From 2006-2007, Gissell played for the Seibu Lions in the Pacific League of Nippon Professional Baseball.

Gissell returned to Major League Baseball on November 20, 2007, when he signed a minor league contract that included an invitation to spring training with the Oakland Athletics. He became a free agent at the end of the season and signed with the Uni-President 7-Eleven Lions of the Chinese Professional Baseball League.

He will be the pitching coach for the Orem Owlz for the 2013 season. The Owlz are the short season A team for the LA Angels.
