= 2002 St. Louis Cardinals season =

Major League Baseball season

2002 St. Louis Cardinals
- National League Central champions
- League: National League
- Division: Central
- Ballpark: Busch Memorial Stadium
- City: St. Louis, Missouri
- Record: 97–65 (.599)
- Divisional place: 1st
- Owners: William DeWitt, Jr.
- General managers: Walt Jocketty
- Managers: Tony La Russa
- Television: Fox Sports Midwest (Joe Buck, Dan McLaughlin); KPLR (Dan McLaughlin, Al Hrabosky; Free TV; Bob Carpenter, Rick Horton)
- Radio: KMOX (Mike Shannon, Joel Meyers)

The 2002 St. Louis Cardinals season was the team's 121st season in St. Louis, Missouri and the 111th season in the National League. The Cardinals went 97–65 during the season and won the National League Central by 13 games over the Houston Astros. In the playoffs, the Cardinals defeated the Arizona Diamondbacks 3 games to 0 in the NLDS but lost to the San Francisco Giants 4 games to 1 in the NLCS.

Second baseman Fernando Viña, shortstop Édgar Rentería, third baseman Scott Rolen, and outfielder Jim Edmonds each won Gold Gloves this year.

On June 18, long-time broadcaster Jack Buck died at the age of 77, while four days later, pitcher Darryl Kile was found dead in a Chicago hotel room, at age 33.

== Offseason ==
- December 11, 2001: Signed free agent pitcher Jason Isringhausen.

== Regular season ==
=== Season standings ===
==== National League Central ====
NL Central
Team	W	L	Pct.	GB	Home	Road
St. Louis Cardinals	97	65	.599	—	52‍–‍29	45‍–‍36
Houston Astros	84	78	.519	13	47‍–‍34	37‍–‍44
Cincinnati Reds	78	84	.481	19	38‍–‍43	40‍–‍41
Pittsburgh Pirates	72	89	.447	24½	38‍–‍42	34‍–‍47
Chicago Cubs	67	95	.414	30	36‍–‍45	31‍–‍50
Milwaukee Brewers	56	106	.346	41	31‍–‍50	25‍–‍56

==== Record vs. opponents ====
2002 National League record Source: MLB Standings Grid – 2002
Team	AZ	ATL	CHC	CIN	COL	FLA	HOU	LAD	MIL	MON	NYM	PHI	PIT	SD	SF	STL	AL
Arizona	—	3–3	4–2	6–0	14–5	5–1	3–3	9–10	4–2	4–2	5–2	4–3	4–2	12–7	8–11	2–4	11–7
Atlanta	3–3	—	4–2	4–2	4–3	11–8	3–3	2–4	5–1	13–6	12–7	11–7	3–3	3–3	3–3–1	5–1	15–3
Chicago	2–4	2–4	—	5–12	4–2	4–2	8–11	2–4	7–10	3–3	1–5	2–4	10–9	2–4	3–3	6–12	6–6
Cincinnati	0–6	2–4	12–5	—	3–3	5–1	6–11	4–2	13–6	1–5	2–4	2–4	11–7	5–1	2–4	8–11	2–10
Colorado	5–14	3–4	2–4	3–3	—	5–2	3–3	7–12	3–3	4–2	3–3	3–3	4–2	11–8	8–12	2–4	7–11
Florida	1–5	8–11	2–4	1–5	2–5	—	3–3	3–3	4–2	10–9	8–11	10–9	4–2	5–1	4–3	4–2	10–8
Houston	3–3	3–3	11–8	11–6	3–3	3–3	—	3–3	10–8	3–3	4–2	3–3	11–6	4–2	1–5	6–13	5–7
Los Angeles	10–9	4–2	4–2	2–4	12–7	3–3	3–3	—	5–1	5–2	4–2	4–3	4–2	10–9	8–11	2–4	12–6
Milwaukee	2–4	1–5	10–7	6–13	3–3	2–4	8–10	1–5	—	2–4	1–5	1–5	4–15	5–1	1–5	7–10	2–10
Montreal	2–4	6–13	3–3	5–1	2–4	9–10	3–3	2–5	4–2	—	11–8	11–8	3–3	3–4	4–2	3–3	12–6
New York	2–5	7–12	5–1	4–2	3–3	11–8	2–4	2–4	5–1	8–11	—	9–10	1–4	3–4	0–6	3–3	10–8
Philadelphia	3–4	7–11	4–2	4–2	3–3	9–10	3–3	3–4	5–1	8–11	10–9	—	2–4	2–4	3–3	4–2	10–8
Pittsburgh	2–4	3–3	9–10	7–11	2–4	2–4	6–11	2–4	15–4	3–3	4–1	4–2	—	2–4	2–4	6–11	3–9
San Diego	7–12	3–3	4–2	1–5	8–11	1–5	2–4	9–10	1–5	4–3	4–3	4–2	4–2	—	5–14	1–5	8–10
San Francisco	11–8	3–3–1	3–3	4–2	11–8	3–4	5–1	11–8	5–1	2–4	6–0	3–3	4–2	14–5	—	2–4	8–10
St. Louis	4–2	1–5	12–6	11–8	4–2	2–4	13–6	4–2	10–7	3–3	3–3	2–4	11–6	5–1	4–2	—	8–4

=== Game log ===
2002 St. Louis Cardinals Game Log (97–65)
April: (12–14)

#	Date	Opponent	Score	Win	Loss	Save	Attendance	Record
1	April 1	Rockies	10–2	Morris	Hampton		48,397	1–0
2	April 3	Rockies	3–6	Neagle	Stephenson	Jiménez	26,557	1–1
3	April 4	Rockies	1–6	Thomson	Benes		27,691	1–2
4	April 5	@ Astros	5–1	Stechschulte	Mlicki		27,189	2–2
5	April 6	@ Astros	8–4	Morris	Cruz		36,255	3–2
6	April 7	@ Astros	6–7	Stone	Hackman		28,206	3–3
7	April 9	Brewers	6–5	Veres	Cabrera	Isringhausen	28,488	4–3
8	April 10	Brewers	6–5	Isringhausen	Vizcaino		28,271	5–3
9	April 11	Brewers	6–5	Veres	Cabrera	Kline	28,165	6–3
10	April 12	Astros	7–3	Morris	Miller		34,120	7–3
11	April 13	Astros	2–1	Isringhausen	Stone		41,552	8–3
12	April 14	Astros	4–5	Reynolds	Stephenson	Wagner	38,609	8–4
13	April 15	@ D'Backs	5–14	Helling	Benes		32,116	8–5
14	April 16	@ D'Backs	3–5	Johnson	B. Smith	Myers	37,505	8–6
15	April 17	@ D'Backs	8–4	Morris	Schilling	Isringhausen	35,147	9–6
16	April 18	@ Brewers	5–7	Cabrera	Hackman	DeJean	17,717	9–7
17	April 19	@ Brewers	1–6	Quevedo	Timlin	Vizcaino	23,865	9–8
18	April 20	@ Brewers	3–5	Vizcaino	Veres	DeJean	30,600	9–9
19	April 21	@ Brewers	3–5	Neugebauer	B. Smith	DeJean	24,592	9–10
20	April 23	@ Mets	3–4	D'Amico	Morris	Benitez	33,333	9–11
21	April 24	@ Mets	4–2	Kile	Leiter	Isringhausen	22,938	10–11
22	April 25	@ Mets	6–7	Strickland	Veres	Benitez	24,637	10–12
23	April 26	@ Expos	7–6	Stechschulte	Ohka	Veres	8,545	11–12
24	April 27	@ Expos	5–0	Matthews	Chen		6,288	12–12
25	April 28	@ Expos	2–5	Ohka	Morris	Herges	9,780	12–13
26	April 30	Marlins	2–7	Burnett	Kile		32,636	12–14

May: (18–10)

#	Date	Opponent	Score	Win	Loss	Save	Attendance	Record
27	May 1	Marlins	6–4	T. Smith	Dempster	Isringhausen	29,755	13–14
28	May 2	Marlins	6–9	Tejera	Veres	Núñez	36,132	13–15
29	May 3	Braves	2–11	Hammond	Stechschulte	Smoltz	40,758	13–16
30	May 4	Braves	3–2	Simontacchi	Lopez	Isringhausen	42,455	14–16
31	May 5	Braves	2–4	Maddux	Kile	Smoltz	39,509	14–17
32	May 6	@ Cubs	5–6	Fassero	Timlin		35,083	14–18
33	May 7	@ Cubs	0–8	Wood	B. Smith		35,748	14–19
34	May 8	@ Cubs	3–2	Morris	Cruz	Isringhausen	33,473	15–19
35	May 10	@ Reds	4–2	Stechschulte	White	Isringhausen	29,008	16–19
36	May 11	@ Reds	1–8	Reitsma	Kile		25,006	16–20
37	May 12	@ Reds	10–8	Stechschulte	Graves	Isringhausen	20,622	17–20
38	May 13	Cubs	3–0	Morris	Wood		45,720	18–20
39	May 14	Cubs	11–2	Timlin	Cruz		47,035	19–20
40	May 15	Cubs	4–1	Stechschulte	Bere	Isringhausen	40,719	20–20
41	May 17	Reds	3–1	Kile	Sullivan	Isringhausen	36,103	21–20
42	May 18	Reds	3–7	Rijo	Morris		40,483	21–21
43	May 19	Reds	10–1	Stephenson	Acevedo		42,992	22–21
44	May 20	Reds	7–3	Williams	Haynes		35,560	23–21
45	May 21	Astros	3–1	Simontacchi	Hernandez	Isringhausen	33,442	24–21
46	May 22	Astros	3–2	Veres	Stone		32,481	25–21
47	May 23	Astros	5–4	Hackman	Dotel	Isringhausen	38,772	26–21
48	May 24	@ Pirates	2–5	Wells	Stephenson		25,203	26–22
49	May 25	@ Pirates	6–3	Williams	Anderson	Isringhausen	26,201	27–22
50	May 26	@ Pirates	7–3	Simontacchi	Fogg		31,989	28–22
51	May 27	@ Astros	4–3	Stechschulte	Oswalt	Isringhausen	30,543	29–22
52	May 28	@ Astros	4–1	Morris	Reynolds	Isringhausen	25,376	30–22
53	May 29	@ Astros	5–10	Redding	Stephenson		27,182	30–23
54	May 31	Pirates	1–3	Fogg	W. Williams	M. Williams	38,148	30–24

June: (12–12)

#	Date	Opponent	Score	Win	Loss	Save	Attendance	Record
55	June 1	Pirates	9–4	Kile	Arroyo		43,295	31–24
56	June 2	Pirates	2–5	Lowe	Morris	M. Williams	37,243	31–25
57	June 4	@ Reds	8–5	Simontacchi	Hamilton		19,189	32–25
	June 5	@ Reds	Postponed (Rain) Makeup date: August 27					
58	June 6	@ Reds	2–3	Haynes	Williams	Graves	23,102	32–26
59	June 7	@ Royals	12–6	Kile	Byrd		34,194	33–26
60	June 8	@ Royals	11–3	Morris	Affeldt		40,016	34–26
61	June 9	@ Royals	2–3	Ro. Hernandez	Timlin		26,905	34–27
62	June 10	@ Mariners	0–10	Moyer	B. Smith		45,699	34–28
63	June 11	@ Mariners	7–4	Williams	Baldwin		44,983	35–28
64	June 12	@ Mariners	0–5	Piñeiro	Kile		45,612	35–29
65	June 14	Royals	3–0	Morris	Asencio	Kline	40,510	36–29
66	June 15	Royals	5–3	Simontacchi	Suppan	Veres	47,453	37–29
67	June 16	Royals	5–1	Williams	May		47,522	38–29
68	June 18	Angels	7–2	Kile	Appier		39,386	39–29
69	June 19	Angels	6–2	Morris	Sele		35,432	40–29
70	June 20	Angels	2–3	Schoeneweis	B. Smith	Percival	36,385	40–30
71	June 21	@ Cubs	1–2	Lieber	Williams		38,486	40–31
	June 22	@ Cubs	Postponed (death of P Darryl Kile) Makeup date: August 31					
72	June 23	@ Cubs	3–8	Wood	Simontacchi		37,647	40–32
73	June 25	Brewers	0–2	Rusch	Morris		33,074	40–33
74	June 26	Brewers	5–2	Williams	Wright	Isringhausen	32,686	41–33
75	June 27	Brewers	2–7	Vizcaino	Stechschulte		31,136	41–34
76	June 28	Reds	3–2	Simontacchi	Reitsma	Isringhausen	38,564	42–34
77	June 29	Reds	2–4	Dessens	Hackman	Graves	46,272	42–35
78	June 30	Reds	8–12	Sullivan	Isringhausen		39,861	42–36

July: (17–9)

#	Date	Opponent	Score	Win	Loss	Save	Attendance	Record
79	July 1	Padres	7–3	Williams	Pérez		30,113	43–36
80	July 2	Padres	11–5	Crudale	Jarvis		29,622	44–36
81	July 3	Padres	4–1	Simontacchi	Lawrence	Isringhausen	41,533	45–36
82	July 4	Dodgers	3–2	T. Smith	Ishii	Isringhausen	39,421	46–36
83	July 5	Dodgers	5–6	Pérez	Morris	Gagné	41,447	46–37
84	July 6	Dodgers	2–4	Quantrill	Kline	Gagné	42,825	46–38
85	July 7	Dodgers	12–6	Matthews	Daal		33,777	47–38
86	July 12	@ Padres	3–4	Holtz	Veres	Hoffman	23,794	47–39
87	July 13	@ Padres	2–1	Crudale	Reed	Isringhausen	48,963	48–39
88	July 14	@ Padres	4–1	B. Smith	B. J. Jones	Isringhausen	24,045	49–39
89	July 15	@ Dodgers	4–2	T. Smith	Daal	Isringhausen	31,899	50–39
90	July 16	@ Dodgers	9–2	Hackman	Nomo		37,988	51–39
91	July 17	@ Giants	4–5	Worrell	Veres	Nen	44,355	51–40
92	July 18	@ Giants	5–1	Morris	Schmidt		44,118	52–40
93	July 19	@ Pirates	9–12	Sauerbeck	Veres		23,812	52–41
94	July 20	@ Pirates	6–15	Benson	T. Smith		35,101	52–42
95	July 21	@ Pirates	8–4	Finley	Fogg	Kline	27,999	53–42
96	July 22	@ Giants	5–3	Hackman	Worrell	Isringhausen	40,607	54–42
97	July 23	@ Giants	4–0	Morris	Schmidt		40,453	55–42
98	July 24	@ Giants	4–6	Rueter	Benes	Nen	41,005	55–43
99	July 25	@ Giants	4–3	T. Smith	Jensen	Isringhausen	41,503	56–43
100	July 26	Cubs	8–4	Finley	Lieber		48,730	57–43
101	July 27	Cubs	3–7	Wood	Simontacchi		47,110	57–44
102	July 28	Cubs	10–9	Veres	Alfonseca		47,583	58–44
103	July 30	@ Marlins	5–0	Benes	Tejera		8,187	59–44
104	July 31	@ Marlins	5–8	Beckett	T. Smith	Looper	7,587	59–45

August: (17–14)

#	Date	Opponent	Score	Win	Loss	Save	Attendance	Record
105	August 1	@ Marlins	0–4	Burnett	Finley		7,346	59–46
106	August 2	@ Braves	5–11	Glavine	Simontacchi		45,512	59–47
107	August 3	@ Braves	1–6	Marquis	Morris		46,356	59–48
108	August 4	@ Braves	1–2	Smoltz	Veres		33,686	59–49
109	August 6	Expos	1–10	Yoshii	Finley		34,126	59–50
110	August 7	Expos	1–4	Ohka	Simontacchi	Stewart	33,179	59–51
111	August 8	Expos	5–3	Morris	Reames	Isringhausen	33,403	60–51
112	August 9	Mets	1–2	Leiter	Matthews	Benitez	44,299	60–52
113	August 10	Mets	5–4	Veres	Reed	Isringhausen	44,934	61–52
114	August 11	Mets	9–0	Finley	Astacio		36,896	62–52
115	August 12	@ Pirates	10–6	Simontacchi	Meadows		15,700	63–52
116	August 13	@ Pirates	9–5	Morris	Anderson	Isringhausen	17,609	64–52
117	August 14	@ Pirates	7–3	Benes	Wells		18,791	65–52
118	August 15	@ Pirates	11–5	Kline	M. Williams		20,503	66–52
119	August 16	@ Phillies	0–4	Wolf	Finley		31,117	66–53
120	August 17	@ Phillies	5–1	Simontacchi	Coggin		20,242	67–53
121	August 18	@ Phillies	5–1	Morris	Padilla		58,493	68–53
122	August 19	Pirates	7–2	Benes	Wells		31,626	69–53
123	August 20	Pirates	0–8	Benson	Hackman		34,997	69–54
124	August 21	Pirates	4–1	Finley	Fogg	Isringhausen	26,806	70–54
125	August 22	Pirates	5–4	Molina	M. Williams		26,606	71–54
126	August 23	Phillies	4–5	Adams	Joseph		35,724	71–55
127	August 24	Phillies	0–4	Padilla	Benes	Mesa	41,033	71–56
128	August 25	Phillies	3–5	Silva	Isringhausen	Mesa	31,850	71–57
129	August 27 (1)	@ Reds	4–5	Reitsma	Simontacchi	Graves		71–58
130	August 27 (2)	@ Reds	5–0	Finley	Dessens		19,570	72–58
131	August 28	@ Reds	9–2	Kline	Estes		17,544	73–58
132	August 29	@ Reds	0–7	Haynes	Williams		20,503	73–59
133	August 30	@ Cubs	6–3	Wright	Zambrano	Veres	36,311	74–59
134	August 31 (1)	@ Cubs	8–1	Hackman	Prior		37,874	75–59
135	August 31 (2)	@ Cubs	10–4	Benes	Bere		37,639	76–59

September: (21–6)

#	Date	Opponent	Score	Win	Loss	Save	Attendance	Record
136	September 1	@ Cubs	4–5	Cruz	Finley	Alfonseca	37,739	76–60
137	September 2	Reds	3–5	Estes	Stephenson	Graves	37,064	76–61
138	September 3	Reds	3–1	Williams	Haynes	Veres	26,641	77–61
139	September 4	Reds	10–5	Hackman	Chen		25,363	78–61
140	September 6	Cubs	11–2	Andy Benes	Alan Benes		38,661	79–61
141	September 7	Cubs	6–5	Fassero	Alfonseca		46,779	80–61
142	September 8	Cubs	3–1	Simontacchi	Wood	Kline	45,265	81–61
143	September 9	@ Brewers	3–0	Williams	Diggins	Kline	16,351	82–61
144	September 10	@ Brewers	8–3	Morris	Franklin		17,539	83–61
145	September 11	@ Brewers	4–3	Fassero	Sheets	Isringhausen	16,907	84–61
146	September 12	@ Astros	3–6	Dotel	Veres	Wagner	26,365	84–62
147	September 13	@ Astros	3–2	White	Gordon	Isringhausen	33,672	85–62
148	September 14	@ Astros	2–1	Williams	Munro	Isringhausen	39,333	86–62
149	September 15	@ Astros	0–8	Miller	Morris		32,456	86–63
150	September 17	@ Rockies	11–4	Fassero	Mercker		25,833	87–63
151	September 18	@ Rockies	8–5	White	Speier	Kline	25,330	88–63
152	September 19	@ Rockies	12–6	Simontacchi	Jennings		25,567	89–63
153	September 20	Astros	9–3	White	Munro		34,990	90–63
154	September 21	Astros	3–6	Miller	Morris		40,365	90–64
155	September 22	Astros	7–3	Finley	Saarloos		38,706	91–64
156	September 23	D'Backs	13–1	Wright	Helling		30,568	92–64
157	September 24	D'Backs	3–2	Isringhausen	Fetters		30,019	93–64
158	September 25	D'Backs	6–1	Stephenson	Schilling		32,212	94–64
159	September 26	Brewers	9–1	Morris	Diggins		27,299	95–64
160	September 27	Brewers	1–2	Sheets	White	DeJean	32,186	95–65
161	September 28	Brewers	3–1	Finley	Rusch	Isringhausen	35,906	96–65
162	September 29	Brewers	4–0	Crudale	Vizcaino		40,250	97–65

=== Transactions ===
- June 9: Released pitcher José Rodríguez.
- July 29: Traded third baseman Plácido Polanco, pitcher Mike Timlin, and pitcher Bud Smith to the Philadelphia Phillies for third baseman Scott Rolen, Doug Nickle and cash.

=== Roster ===
2002 St. Louis Cardinals
Roster
Pitchers: 40 Andy Benes; 54 Mike Crudale; 52 Matt Duff; 13 Jeff Fassero; 31 Chuck Finley; 47 Luther Hackman; 44 Jason Isringhausen; 58 Kevin Joseph; 57 Darryl Kile †; 49 Steve Kline; 48 Mike Matthews; 56 Gabe Molina; 35 Matt Morris; 60 Josh Pearce; 58 José Rodríguez; 52 Nerio Rodríguez; 46 Jason Simontacchi; 52 Bud Smith; 53 Travis Smith; 36 Gene Stechschulte; 55 Garrett Stephenson; 50 Mike Timlin; 43 Dave Veres; 50 Rick White; 19 Woody Williams; 23 Jamey Wright	Catchers: 8 Mike DiFelice; 26 Eli Marrero; 22 Mike Matheny; Infielders: 28 Mike Coolbaugh; 16 Iván Cruz; 30 Wilson Delgado; 21 Tino Martinez; 33 Eduardo Pérez; 27 Plácido Polanco; 3 Édgar Rentería; 16,27 Scott Rolen; 4 Fernando Viña	Outfielders: 41 Miguel Cairo; 7 J. D. Drew; 15 Jim Edmonds; 5 Albert Pujols; 0 Kerry Robinson; 99 So Taguchi	Manager: 10 Tony La Russa; Coaches: 18 Dave Duncan (Pitching); 38 Marty Mason (Bullpen); 39 Dave McKay (First Base); 11 José Oquendo (Third Base); 12 Mitchell Page (Hitting); 24 Joe Pettini (Bench)

== Player stats ==
=== Batting ===
==== Starters by position ====
Note: Pos = Position; G = Games played; AB = At bats; H = Hits; Avg. = Batting average; HR = Home runs; RBI = Runs batted in

Pos	Player	G	AB	H	Avg.	HR	RBI
C	Mike Matheny	110	315	77	.244	3	35
1B	Tino Martinez	150	511	134	.262	21	75
2B	Fernando Viña	150	622	168	.270	1	54
SS	Édgar Rentería	152	544	166	.305	11	83
3B	Plácido Polanco	94	342	97	.284	5	27
LF	Albert Pujols	157	590	185	.314	34	127
CF	Jim Edmonds	144	476	148	.311	28	83
RF	J.D. Drew	135	424	107	.252	18	56

==== Other batters ====
Note: G = Games played; AB = At bats; H = Hits; Avg. = Batting average; HR = Home runs; RBI = Runs batted in

Player	G	AB	H	Avg.	HR	RBI
Eli Marrero	131	397	104	.262	18	66
Scott Rolen	55	205	57	.278	14	44
Miguel Cairo	108	184	46	.250	2	23
Kerry Robinson	124	181	47	.260	1	15
Mike DiFelice	70	174	40	.230	4	19
Eduardo Pérez	96	154	31	.201	10	26
Wilson Delgado	12	20	4	.200	2	5
So Taguchi	19	15	6	.400	0	2
Iván Cruz	17	14	5	.357	1	3
Mike Coolbaugh	5	12	1	.083	0	0

=== Pitching ===
==== Starting pitchers ====
Note: G = Games; IP = Innings pitched; W = Wins; L = Losses; ERA = Earned run average; SO = Strikeouts

Player	G	IP	W	L	ERA	SO
Matt Morris	32	210.1	17	9	3.42	171
Jason Simontacchi	24	143.1	11	5	4.02	72
Woody Williams	17	103.1	9	4	2.53	76
Andy Benes	18	97.0	5	4	2.78	64
Chuck Finley	14	85.1	7	4	3.80	83
Darryl Kile	14	84.2	5	4	3.72	50
Josh Pearce	3	13.0	0	0	7.62	1

==== Other pitchers ====
Note: G = Games pitched; IP = Innings pitched; W = Wins; L = Losses; ERA = Earned run average; SO = Strikeouts

Player	G	IP	W	L	ERA	SO
Luther Hackman	43	81.0	5	4	4.11	46
Travis Smith	12	54.0	4	2	7.17	32
Bud Smith	11	48.0	1	5	6.94	22
Garrett Stephenson	12	45.0	2	5	5.40	34
Jamey Wright	4	15.0	2	0	4.80	8

==== Relief pitchers ====
Note: G = Games; W = Wins; L = Losses; SV = Saves; ERA = Earned run average; SO = Strikeouts

Player	G	W	L	SV	ERA	SO
Jason Isringhausen	60	3	2	32	2.48	68
Dave Veres	71	5	8	4	3.48	68
Steve Kline	66	2	1	6	3.39	41
Mike Crudale	49	3	0	0	1.88	47
Mike Matthews	43	2	1	0	3.39	32
Mike Timlin	42	1	3	0	2.51	35
Gene Stechschulte	29	6	2	0	4.78	21
Rick White	20	3	1	0	0.82	14
Jeff Fassero	16	3	0	0	3.00	12
Gabe Molina	12	1	0	0	1.59	4
Kevin Joseph	11	0	1	0	4.91	2
Matt Duff	7	0	0	0	4.76	4
Nerio Rodríguez	2	0	0	0	4.15	2
José Rodríguez	2	0	0	0	54.00	0

== NLDS ==
St. Louis wins the series, 3–0

Game	Home	Score	Visitor	Score	Date	Stadium	Series
1	Arizona	2	St. Louis	12	October 1	Bank One Ballpark	1–0 (STL)
2	Arizona	1	St. Louis	2	October 3	Bank One Ballpark	2–0 (STL)
3	St. Louis	6	Arizona	3	October 5	Busch Stadium	3–0 (STL)

== NLCS ==
=== Game 1 ===
October 9: Busch Stadium, St. Louis, Missouri

Team	1	2	3	4	5	6	7	8	9	R	H	E
San Francisco	1	4	1	0	1	2	0	0	0	9	11	0
St. Louis	0	1	0	0	2	2	0	1	0	6	11	0
WP: Kirk Rueter (1–0) LP: Matt Morris (0–1) Sv: Robb Nen (1); Home runs: SFG: Kenny Lofton (1), David Bell (1), Benito Santiago (1); STL: Albert Pujols (1), Miguel Cairo (1), J. D. Drew (1)

=== Game 2 ===
October 10: Busch Stadium, St. Louis, Missouri

Team	1	2	3	4	5	6	7	8	9	R	H	E
San Francisco	1	0	0	0	2	0	0	0	1	4	7	0
St. Louis	0	0	0	0	0	0	0	1	0	1	6	0
WP: Jason Schmidt (1–0) LP: Woody Williams (0–1) Sv: Robb Nen (2); Home runs: SFG: Rich Aurilia 2 (2); STL: Eduardo Pérez (1)

=== Game 3 ===
October 12: Pac Bell Park, San Francisco

Team	1	2	3	4	5	6	7	8	9	R	H	E
St. Louis	0	0	2	1	1	1	0	0	0	5	6	1
San Francisco	0	1	0	0	3	0	0	0	0	4	10	0
WP: Chuck Finley (1–0) LP: Jay Witasick (0–1) Sv: Jason Isringhausen (1); Home runs: STL: Mike Matheny (1), Jim Edmonds (1), Eli Marrero (1); SFG: Barry Bonds (1)

=== Game 4 ===
October 13: Pac Bell Park, San Francisco

Team	1	2	3	4	5	6	7	8	9	R	H	E
St. Louis	2	0	0	0	0	0	0	0	1	3	12	0
San Francisco	0	0	0	0	0	2	0	2	X	4	4	1
WP: Tim Worrell (1–0) LP: Rick White (0–1) Sv: Robb Nen (3); Home runs: STL: None; SFG: Benito Santiago (2)

=== Game 5 ===
October 14: Pac Bell Park, San Francisco

Team	1	2	3	4	5	6	7	8	9	R	H	E
St. Louis	0	0	0	0	0	1	0	0	0	1	9	0
San Francisco	0	0	0	0	0	0	0	1	1	2	7	0
WP: Tim Worrell (2–0) LP: Matt Morris (0–2)

== Farm system ==
Level	Team	League	Manager
AAA	Memphis Redbirds	Pacific Coast League	Gaylen Pitts
AA	New Haven Ravens	Eastern League	Mark DeJohn
A	Potomac Cannons	Carolina League	Joe Cunningham, Jr.
A	Peoria Chiefs	Midwest League	Danny Sheaffer
A-Short Season	New Jersey Cardinals	New York–Penn League	Tommy Shields
Rookie	Johnson City Cardinals	Appalachian League	Brian Rupp

LEAGUE CHAMPIONS: Peoria
