= 2002 Pittsburgh Pirates season =

2002 Pittsburgh Pirates
- League: National League
- Division: Central
- Ballpark: PNC Park
- City: Pittsburgh, Pennsylvania
- Record: 72–89 (.447)
- Divisional place: 4th
- Owners: Kevin McClatchy
- General managers: Dave Littlefield
- Managers: Lloyd McClendon
- Television: WCWB-TV; Fox Sports Net Pittsburgh
- Radio: KDKA-AM (Steve Blass, Greg Brown, Lanny Frattare, Bob Walk)

The 2002 Pittsburgh Pirates season was the 121st season of the franchise; the 116th in the National League. This was their second season at PNC Park. The Pirates finished fourth in the National League Central with a record of 72–89.

The Pirates missed the playoffs for the tenth straight season, tying a divisional era record set between 1980 and 1989.

== Offseason ==
- January 5, 2002: Scott Service was signed as a free agent with the Pittsburgh Pirates.
- January 25, 2002: Wayne Gomes was signed as a free agent with the Pittsburgh Pirates.
- March 5, 2002: Curtis Pride was signed as a free agent with the Pittsburgh Pirates.
- March 5, 2002: Josías Manzanillo was signed as a free agent with the Pittsburgh Pirates.

== Regular season ==
=== Season standings ===
NL Central
Team	W	L	Pct.	GB	Home	Road
St. Louis Cardinals	97	65	.599	—	52‍–‍29	45‍–‍36
Houston Astros	84	78	.519	13	47‍–‍34	37‍–‍44
Cincinnati Reds	78	84	.481	19	38‍–‍43	40‍–‍41
Pittsburgh Pirates	72	89	.447	24½	38‍–‍42	34‍–‍47
Chicago Cubs	67	95	.414	30	36‍–‍45	31‍–‍50
Milwaukee Brewers	56	106	.346	41	31‍–‍50	25‍–‍56

=== Game log ===
2002 Game Log (72–89)
April (14–10)

#	Date	Opponent	Score	Win	Loss	Save	Attendance	Record
1	April 1	@ Mets	2–6	Leiter (1–0)	**Villone** (0–1)	—	53,734	0–1
2	April 3	@ Mets	5–3	**Wells** (1–0)	Trachsel (0–1)	**Williams** (1)	25,952	1–1
3	April 4	@ Mets	3–2	**Anderson** (1–0)	Estes (0–1)	**Williams** (2)	33,785	2–1
4	April 5	@ Cubs	2–1	**Williams** (1–0)	Bere (0–1)	**Williams** (3)	41,555	3–1
5	April 6	@ Cubs	6–1	**Fogg** (1–0)	Clement (0–1)	—	34,956	4–1
—	April 7	@ Cubs	**Postponed** (rain; rescheduled for May 21)					
6	April 8	Reds	1–0	**Villone** (1–1)	Dessens (0–2)	**Williams** (4)	36,402	5–1
7	April 10	Reds	5–8	Acevedo (2–0)	**Wells** (1–1)	Graves (2)	36,048	5–2
8	April 11	Reds	2–3	Haynes (1–1)	**Anderson** (1–1)	Graves (3)	12,795	5–3
9	April 12	Cubs	3–7	Bere (1–1)	**Williams** (1–1)	—	24,002	5–4
10	April 13	Cubs	3–2	**Fogg** (2–0)	Clement (0–2)	**Williams** (5)	17,971	6–4
11	April 14	Cubs	1–5 (8)	Lieber (2–0)	**Villone** (1–2)	Borowski (1)	16,045	6–5
12	April 15	@ Brewers	6–1	**Wells** (2–1)	Rusch (1–1)	—	14,090	7–5
13	April 16	@ Brewers	5–1	**Anderson** (2–1)	Neugebauer (0–2)	—	15,012	8–5
14	April 17	@ Brewers	3–2	**Williams** (2–1)	Buddie (0–1)	**Williams** (6)	17,879	9–5
15	April 19	Phillies	7–4	**Lowe** (1–0)	Padilla (2–2)	**Williams** (7)	23,321	10–5
16	April 20	Phillies	6–5	**Villone** (2–2)	Adams (0–2)	**Williams** (8)	18,032	11–5
17	April 21	Phillies	9–3	**Wells** (3–1)	Duckworth (1–1)	—	18,749	12–5
18	April 23	Dodgers	6–9	Ishii (4–0)	**Anderson** (2–2)	Gagne (8)	13,235	12–6
19	April 24	Dodgers	1–5	Daal (3–0)	**Williams** (2–2)	—	14,057	12–7
20	April 25	Dodgers	3–2	**Fogg** (3–0)	Nomo (2–3)	**Williams** (9)	16,264	13–7
21	April 26	Padres	1–10	Tomko (2–1)	**Villone** (2–3)	—	20,575	13–8
—	April 27	Padres	**Postponed** (rain; rescheduled for April 28)					
22	April 28	Padres	3–2	**Sauerbeck** (1–0)	Embree (2–1)	**Williams** (10)	—	14–8
23	April 28	Padres	2–7	Tollberg (1–3)	**Anderson** (2–3)	—	19,621	14–9
24	April 30	@ Rockies	0–10	Hampton (1–3)	**Williams** (2–3)	—	30,759	14–10

May (11–19)

#	Date	Opponent	Score	Win	Loss	Save	Attendance	Record
25	May 1	@ Rockies	0–6	Neagle (3–1)	**Fogg** (3–1)	—	29,529	14–11
26	May 2	@ Rockies	2–7	Thomson (4–2)	**Villone** (2–4)	—	30,134	14–12
27	May 3	@ Padres	6–4	**Wells** (4–1)	Howard (0–1)	**Williams** (11)	20,312	15–12
28	May 4	@ Padres	0–3	Jarvis (2–3)	**Anderson** (2–4)	Hoffman (10)	36,972	15–13
29	May 5	@ Padres	5–6	Lawrence (4–1)	**Lowe** (1–1)	Hoffman (11)	27,399	15–14
30	May 6	@ Diamondbacks	3–2	**Fogg** (4–1)	Johnson (6–1)	**Williams** (12)	29,171	16–14
31	May 7	@ Diamondbacks	6–7	Myers (2–1)	**Beimel** (0–1)	Kim (9)	32,204	16–15
32	May 8	@ Diamondbacks	3–4	Schilling (7–1)	**Wells** (4–2)	Kim (10)	31,343	16–16
33	May 10	Astros	5–1	**Anderson** (3–4)	Hernandez (3–1)	—	19,197	17–16
34	May 11	Astros	4–2	**Fogg** (5–1)	Oswalt (4–2)	**Williams** (13)	35,834	18–16
35	May 12	Astros	1–5	Reynolds (3–3)	**Williams** (2–4)	—	20,202	18–17
36	May 13	Diamondbacks	0–11	Schilling (8–1)	**Benson** (0–1)	—	14,500	18–18
37	May 14	Diamondbacks	2–1	**Wells** (5–2)	Anderson (0–3)	**Williams** (14)	16,373	19–18
38	May 15	Diamondbacks	2–6	Helling (4–4)	**Anderson** (3–5)	—	18,780	19–19
39	May 16	@ Astros	1–3	Oswalt (5–2)	**Boehringer** (0–1)	Wagner (6)	26,277	19–20
40	May 17	@ Astros	4–7	Stone (2–1)	**Villone** (2–5)	Dotel (1)	28,861	19–21
41	May 18	@ Astros	1–2	Dotel (2–1)	**Lowe** (1–2)	—	34,921	19–22
42	May 19	@ Astros	5–3	**Wells** (6–2)	Mlicki (3–5)	**Williams** (15)	34,259	20–22
43	May 21	@ Cubs	12–1	**Anderson** (4–5)	Bere (1–7)	—	—	21–22
44	May 21	@ Cubs	3–4	Cruz (1–7)	**Fogg** (5–2)	Alfonseca (6)	37,175	21–23
45	May 22	@ Cubs	4–7	Prior (1–0)	**Williams** (2–5)	Alfonseca (7)	40,138	21–24
46	May 23	@ Cubs	6–11	Clement (2–3)	**Benson** (0–2)	—	37,578	21–25
47	May 24	Cardinals	5–2	**Wells** (7–2)	Stephenson (1–3)	—	25,203	22–25
48	May 25	Cardinals	3–6	Williams (2–0)	**Anderson** (4–6)	Isringhausen (13)	26,201	22–26
49	May 26	Cardinals	3–7	Simontacchi (3–0)	**Fogg** (5–3)	—	31,989	22–27
50	May 27	Cubs	3–2 (10)	**Williams** (1–0)	Alfonseca (0–1)	—	16,215	23–27
51	May 28	Cubs	0–3	Clement (3–3)	**Benson** (0–3)	—	15,060	23–28
52	May 29	Cubs	5–0	**Wells** (8–2)	Lieber (3–4)	—	17,116	24–28
53	May 30	Cubs	8–9	Wood (6–3)	**Anderson** (4–7)	Alfonseca (8)	21,208	24–29
54	May 31	@ Cardinals	3–1	**Fogg** (6–3)	Williams (2–1)	**Williams** (16)	38,148	25–29

June (11–15)

#	Date	Opponent	Score	Win	Loss	Save	Attendance	Record
55	June 1	@ Cardinals	4–9	Kile (3–3)	**Arroyo** (0–1)	—	43,295	25–30
56	June 2	@ Cardinals	5–2	**Lowe** (2–2)	Morris (7–4)	**Williams** (17)	37,243	26–30
57	June 3	@ Expos	5–7	Ohka (5–3)	**Wells** (8–3)	Stewart (5)	4,821	26–31
58	June 4	@ Expos	5–2	**Anderson** (5–7)	Pavano (3–7)	**Williams** (18)	4,619	27–31
59	June 5	@ Expos	1–3	Vazquez (4–2)	**Fogg** (6–4)	—	4,890	27–32
60	June 7	Brewers	6–1	**Beimel** (1–1)	Sheets (3–6)	—	27,001	28–32
61	June 8	Brewers	9–8 (11)	**Boehringer** (1–1)	King (1–2)	—	38,244	29–32
62	June 9	Brewers	5–4	**Sauerbeck** (2–0)	Wright (1–3)	**Williams** (19)	24,897	30–32
63	June 10	@ Angels	3–4	Washburn (6–2)	**Anderson** (5–8)	Percival (14)	16,861	30–33
64	June 11	@ Angels	7–3	**Fogg** (7–4)	Appier (5–5)	—	17,755	31–33
65	June 12	@ Angels	5–8	Weber (3–2)	**Boehringer** (1–2)	Percival (15)	17,096	31–34
66	June 14	@ Reds	3–4 (11)	Williamson (2–0)	**Williams** (1–1)	—	30,820	31–35
67	June 15	@ Reds	3–4	Sullivan (4–2)	**Lincoln** (0–1)	Graves (21)	31,419	31–36
68	June 16	@ Reds	5–1	**Anderson** (6–8)	Haynes (7–6)	—	29,532	32–36
69	June 18	Athletics	2–4	Mulder (7–4)	**Fogg** (7–5)	Koch (16)	21,943	32–37
70	June 19	Athletics	2–3 (10)	Bradford (3–1)	**Williams** (1–2)	Koch (17)	30,562	32–38
71	June 20	Athletics	3–5	Hudson (5–6)	**Benson** (0–4)	Koch (18)	22,464	32–39
72	June 21	Rangers	0–2	Rogers (8–4)	**Wells** (8–4)	Cordero (3)	24,475	32–40
73	June 22	Rangers	2–3	Bell (3–2)	**Lincoln** (0–2)	Irabu (13)	35,302	32–41
74	June 23	Rangers	4–10	Park (3–3)	**Fogg** (7–6)	—	26,930	32–42
75	June 25	Expos	4–1	**Benson** (1–4)	Ohka (7–4)	**Williams** (20)	17,543	33–42
76	June 26	Expos	7–4	**Wells** (9–4)	Vazquez (5–4)	**Williams** (21)	36,966	34–42
77	June 27	Expos	2–7 (7)	Brower (3–0)	**Villone** (2–6)	—	21,312	34–43
78	June 28	@ Tigers	3–1	**Fogg** (8–6)	Redman (3–8)	**Williams** (22)	28,582	35–43
79	June 29	@ Tigers	1–2	Weaver (6–8)	**Beimel** (1–2)	Acevedo (12)	24,449	35–44
80	June 30	@ Tigers	6–2	**Benson** (2–4)	Maroth (1–2)	**Williams** (23)	25,966	36–44

July (13–14)

#	Date	Opponent	Score	Win	Loss	Save	Attendance	Record
81	July 1	Brewers	0–2	Wright (2–6)	**Wells** (9–5)	—	14,634	36–45
82	July 2	Brewers	6–12	Quevedo (4–6)	**Anderson** (6–9)	—	15,142	36–46
83	July 3	Brewers	3–1	**Fogg** (9–6)	Sheets (4–10)	**Williams** (24)	32,309	37–46
84	July 4	Astros	6–8	Borbon (3–3)	**Beimel** (1–3)	—	25,962	37–47
85	July 5	Astros	4–3	**Fetters** (1–0)	Borbon (3–4)	**Williams** (25)	24,556	38–47
86	July 6	Astros	2–10	Cruz (1–4)	**Wells** (9–6)	—	26,578	38–48
87	July 7	Astros	1–6	Miller (4–3)	**Anderson** (6–10)	—	23,348	38–49
88	July 11	@ Brewers	3–2 (10)	**Boehringer** (2–2)	DeJean (0–4)	**Williams** (26)	21,021	39–49
89	July 12	@ Brewers	9–2	**Lowe** (3–2)	Rusch (5–8)	—	26,362	40–49
90	July 13	@ Brewers	5–3	**Wells** (10–6)	Wright (2–8)	**Williams** (27)	28,214	41–49
91	July 14	@ Brewers	3–5	Quevedo (5–6)	**Beimel** (1–4)	DeJean (16)	21,976	41–50
92	July 15	@ Astros	5–4	**Lowe** (4–2)	Wagner (2–2)	**Williams** (28)	29,204	42–50
93	July 16	@ Astros	7–3	**Fogg** (10–6)	Oswalt (10–6)	**Boehringer** (1)	27,042	43–50
94	July 17	Reds	6–3	**Anderson** (7–10)	Dempster (5–10)	**Williams** (29)	32,864	44–50
95	July 18	Reds	5–7	Sullivan (6–3)	**Boehringer** (2–3)	Graves (28)	21,625	44–51
96	July 19	Cardinals	12–9	**Sauerbeck** (3–0)	Veres (3–6)	—	23,812	45–51
97	July 20	Cardinals	15–6	**Benson** (3–4)	Smith (3–1)	—	35,101	46–51
98	July 21	Cardinals	4–8	Finley (5–11)	**Fogg** (10–7)	Kline (3)	27,999	46–52
99	July 22	@ Reds	6–5	**Anderson** (8–10)	Dempster (5–11)	**Williams** (30)	18,398	47–52
100	July 23	@ Reds	2–7	Haynes (11–6)	**Wells** (10–7)	—	19,884	47–53
101	July 24	@ Reds	5–10	Moehler (2–1)	**Beimel** (1–5)	—	24,910	47–54
102	July 25	@ Astros	0–8	Saarloos (2–2)	**Benson** (3–5)	—	26,027	47–55
103	July 26	@ Astros	3–4	Wagner (3–2)	**Sauerbeck** (3–1)	—	32,115	47–56
104	July 27	@ Astros	0–3	Oswalt (11–6)	**Anderson** (8–11)	Wagner (20)	38,896	47–57
105	July 28	@ Astros	0–4	Miller (8–3)	**Wells** (10–8)	—	35,144	47–58
106	July 30	Rockies	4–1	**Benson** (4–5)	Neagle (4–7)	**Williams** (31)	23,749	48–58
107	July 31	Rockies	7–6	**Boehringer** (3–3)	White (2–6)	**Williams** (32)	18,106	49–58

August (11–18)

#	Date	Opponent	Score	Win	Loss	Save	Attendance	Record
108	August 1	Rockies	0–3	Jennings (11–5)	**Meadows** (0–1)	Jimenez (27)	19,075	49–59
109	August 2	Giants	6–5	**Boehringer** (4–3)	Nen (4–1)	—	28,203	50–59
110	August 3	Giants	6–11	Schmidt (7–5)	**Wells** (10–9)	—	38,275	50–60
111	August 4	Giants	5–10	Rueter (10–6)	**Benson** (4–6)	—	31,398	50–61
112	August 6	@ Dodgers	3–1	**Fogg** (11–7)	Perez (10–8)	**Williams** (33)	31,254	51–61
113	August 7	@ Dodgers	0–4	Ashby (8–9)	**Meadows** (0–2)	Gagne (37)	31,588	51–62
114	August 8	@ Dodgers	5–10	Beirne (1–0)	**Anderson** (8–12)	—	31,776	51–63
115	August 9	@ Giants	4–3	**Wells** (11–9)	Schmidt (7–6)	**Williams** (34)	41,897	52–63
116	August 10	@ Giants	3–8	Aybar (1–0)	**Lincoln** (0–3)	—	41,146	52–64
117	August 11	@ Giants	4–5 (11)	Nen (6–1)	**Williams** (1–3)	—	41,479	52–65
118	August 12	Cardinals	6–10	Simontacchi (8–4)	**Meadows** (0–3)	—	15,700	52–66
119	August 13	Cardinals	5–9	Morris (14–7)	**Anderson** (8–13)	Isringhausen (27)	17,609	52–67
120	August 14	Cardinals	3–7	Benes (2–3)	**Wells** (11–10)	—	18,791	52–68
121	August 15	Cardinals	5–11	Kline (1–1)	**Williams** (1–4)	—	20,503	52–69
122	August 16	Brewers	3–10	Sheets (7–14)	**Fogg** (11–8)	—	35,343	52–70
123	August 17	Brewers	5–0	**Meadows** (1–3)	Cabrera (5–9)	—	25,277	53–70
124	August 18	Brewers	3–2	**Arroyo** (1–1)	Rusch (6–13)	**Williams** (35)	20,170	54–70
125	August 19	@ Cardinals	2–7	Benes (3–3)	**Wells** (11–11)	—	31,626	54–71
126	August 20	@ Cardinals	8–0	**Benson** (5–6)	Hackman (3–4)	—	34,997	55–71
127	August 21	@ Cardinals	1–4	Finley (8–14)	**Fogg** (11–9)	Isringhausen (28)	26,806	55–72
128	August 22	@ Cardinals	4–5	Molina (1–0)	**Williams** (1–5)	—	26,606	55–73
129	August 23	@ Brewers	6–3	**Lincoln** (1–3)	Durocher (1–1)	**Williams** (36)	30,957	56–73
130	August 24	@ Brewers	17–10	**Wells** (12–11)	Cabrera (5–10)	—	22,568	57–73
131	August 25	@ Brewers	3–2	**Benson** (6–6)	Wright (5–13)	**Williams** (37)	19,443	58–73
132	August 27	Braves	4–5	Millwood (14–6)	**Fogg** (11–10)	Smoltz (46)	20,542	58–74
133	August 28	Braves	1–0 (10)	**Williams** (2–5)	Remlinger (7–2)	—	20,136	59–74
134	August 29	Braves	4–1	**Arroyo** (2–1)	Glavine (16–8)	**Williams** (38)	17,312	60–74
135	August 30	@ Marlins	3–4	Tavarez (10–10)	**Wells** (12–12)	Looper (8)	4,962	60–75
136	August 31	@ Marlins	2–3	Nunez (6–5)	**Sauerbeck** (3–2)	Looper (9)	10,188	60–76

September (12–13)

#	Date	Opponent	Score	Win	Loss	Save	Attendance	Record
137	September 1	@ Marlins	4–8	Neal (3–0)	**Fogg** (11–11)	—	5,588	60–77
138	September 2	@ Braves	1–5	Maddux (12–5)	**Meadows** (1–4)	—	30,803	60–78
139	September 3	@ Braves	3–0	**Torres** (1–0)	Glavine (16–9)	**Williams** (39)	18,931	61–78
140	September 4	@ Braves	0–6	Moss (10–5)	**Wells** (12–13)	—	19,525	61–79
141	September 6	Marlins	11–0	**Benson** (7–6)	Tejera (8–7)	—	33,525	62–79
142	September 7	Marlins	4–1	**Fogg** (12–11)	Robertson (0–1)	**Williams** (40)	18,848	63–79
143	September 8	Marlins	1–11	Pavano (4–10)	**Meadows** (1–5)	—	15,211	63–80
144	September 9	@ Reds	8–9	Dempster (8–13)	**Torres** (1–1)	Williamson (1)	13,434	63–81
145	September 10	@ Reds	0–3	Reitsma (6–10)	**Wells** (12–14)	Williamson (2)	13,153	63–82
146	September 11	@ Reds	4–1	**Villone** (3–6)	Dessens (7–8)	**Williams** (41)	14,514	64–82
147	September 13	@ Phillies	5–3	**Beimel** (2–5)	Timlin (4–6)	**Williams** (42)	13,718	65–82
148	September 14	@ Phillies	1–4	Junge (1–0)	**Meadows** (1–6)	Mesa (40)	16,621	65–83
149	September 15	@ Phillies	0–1 (10)	Mesa (4–6)	**Sauerbeck** (3–3)	—	23,054	65–84
150	September 16	Reds	3–4	Silva (1–0)	**Lincoln** (1–4)	Williamson (5)	10,752	65–85
151	September 17	Reds	11–3	**Benson** (8–6)	Reitsma (6–12)	—	10,991	66–85
152	September 18	Reds	3–2	**Lincoln** (2–4)	Riedling (2–3)	**Williams** (43)	11,684	67–85
153	September 19	Reds	4–5	Hamilton (4–9)	**Williams** (2–6)	Williamson (6)	11,338	67–86
154	September 20	Cubs	5–4	**Sauerbeck** (4–3)	Alfonseca (2–5)	—	22,299	68–86
155	September 21	Cubs	2–4	Farnsworth (4–6)	**Sauerbeck** (4–4)	Cruz (1)	33,653	68–87
156	September 22	Cubs	5–4	**Benson** (9–6)	Benes (2–2)	**Williams** (44)	25,026	69–87
157	September 24	Mets	6–3	**Sauerbeck** (5–4)	Guthrie (5–3)	**Williams** (45)	13,249	70–87
158	September 25	Mets	4–3	**Villone** (4–6)	Roberts (3–1)	**Williams** (46)	11,641	71–87
—	September 26	Mets	**Cancelled** (rain; not rescheduled)					
159	September 27	@ Cubs	13–3	**Torres** (2–1)	Mahomes (1–1)	—	27,637	72–87
160	September 28	@ Cubs	4–5	Cruz (3–11)	**Boehringer** (4–4)	—	38,617	72–88
161	September 29	@ Cubs	3–7	Wood (12–11)	**Fogg** (12–12)	—	37,541	72–89

Legend: = Win = Loss = Postponement
Bold = Pirates team member

=== Record vs. opponents ===
2002 National League record Source: MLB Standings Grid – 2002
Team	AZ	ATL	CHC	CIN	COL	FLA	HOU	LAD	MIL	MON	NYM	PHI	PIT	SD	SF	STL	AL
Arizona	—	3–3	4–2	6–0	14–5	5–1	3–3	9–10	4–2	4–2	5–2	4–3	4–2	12–7	8–11	2–4	11–7
Atlanta	3–3	—	4–2	4–2	4–3	11–8	3–3	2–4	5–1	13–6	12–7	11–7	3–3	3–3	3–3–1	5–1	15–3
Chicago	2–4	2–4	—	5–12	4–2	4–2	8–11	2–4	7–10	3–3	1–5	2–4	10–9	2–4	3–3	6–12	6–6
Cincinnati	0–6	2–4	12–5	—	3–3	5–1	6–11	4–2	13–6	1–5	2–4	2–4	11–7	5–1	2–4	8–11	2–10
Colorado	5–14	3–4	2–4	3–3	—	5–2	3–3	7–12	3–3	4–2	3–3	3–3	4–2	11–8	8–12	2–4	7–11
Florida	1–5	8–11	2–4	1–5	2–5	—	3–3	3–3	4–2	10–9	8–11	10–9	4–2	5–1	4–3	4–2	10–8
Houston	3–3	3–3	11–8	11–6	3–3	3–3	—	3–3	10–8	3–3	4–2	3–3	11–6	4–2	1–5	6–13	5–7
Los Angeles	10–9	4–2	4–2	2–4	12–7	3–3	3–3	—	5–1	5–2	4–2	4–3	4–2	10–9	8–11	2–4	12–6
Milwaukee	2–4	1–5	10–7	6–13	3–3	2–4	8–10	1–5	—	2–4	1–5	1–5	4–15	5–1	1–5	7–10	2–10
Montreal	2–4	6–13	3–3	5–1	2–4	9–10	3–3	2–5	4–2	—	11–8	11–8	3–3	3–4	4–2	3–3	12–6
New York	2–5	7–12	5–1	4–2	3–3	11–8	2–4	2–4	5–1	8–11	—	9–10	1–4	3–4	0–6	3–3	10–8
Philadelphia	3–4	7–11	4–2	4–2	3–3	9–10	3–3	3–4	5–1	8–11	10–9	—	2–4	2–4	3–3	4–2	10–8
Pittsburgh	2–4	3–3	9–10	7–11	2–4	2–4	6–11	2–4	15–4	3–3	4–1	4–2	—	2–4	2–4	6–11	3–9
San Diego	7–12	3–3	4–2	1–5	8–11	1–5	2–4	9–10	1–5	4–3	4–3	4–2	4–2	—	5–14	1–5	8–10
San Francisco	11–8	3–3–1	3–3	4–2	11–8	3–4	5–1	11–8	5–1	2–4	6–0	3–3	4–2	14–5	—	2–4	8–10
St. Louis	4–2	1–5	12–6	11–8	4–2	2–4	13–6	4–2	10–7	3–3	3–3	2–4	11–6	5–1	4–2	—	8–4

=== Detailed records ===
**National League**
Opponent	W	L	WP	RS	RA
**NL East**
Atlanta Braves	3	3	0.500	13	17
Florida Marlins	2	4	0.333	25	27
Montreal Expos	3	3	0.500	24	24
New York Mets	4	1	0.800	20	17
Philadelphia Phillies	4	2	0.667	28	20
Total	16	13	0.552	110	105
**NL Central**
Chicago Cubs	9	10	0.474	88	80
Cincinnati Reds	7	11	0.389	76	79
Houston Astros	6	11	0.353	49	76
Milwaukee Brewers	15	4	0.789	100	71
St. Louis Cardinals	6	11	0.353	88	103
Total	43	47	0.478	401	409
**NL West**
Arizona Diamondbacks	2	4	0.333	16	31
Colorado Rockies	2	4	0.333	13	33
Los Angeles Dodgers	2	4	0.333	18	31
San Diego Padres	2	4	0.333	17	32
San Francisco Giants	2	4	0.333	28	42
Total	10	20	0.333	92	169
**American League**
Anaheim Angels	1	2	0.333	15	15
Detroit Tigers	2	1	0.667	10	5
Oakland Athletics	0	3	0.000	7	12
Texas Rangers	0	3	0.000	6	15
Total	3	9	0.250	38	47
Total	72	89	0.447	641	730

Month	Games	Won	Lost	Win %	RS	RA
April	24	14	10	0.583	85	99
May	30	11	19	0.367	105	133
June	26	11	15	0.423	102	104
July	27	13	14	0.481	123	142
August	29	11	18	0.379	121	153
September	25	12	13	0.480	105	99
Total	161	72	89	0.447	641	730

	Games	Won	Lost	Win %	RS	RA
Home	80	38	42	0.475	330	389
Away	81	34	47	0.420	311	341
Total	161	72	89	0.447	641	730

== Roster ==
2002 Pittsburgh Pirates
Roster
Pitchers: 55 Jimmy Anderson; 69 Bronson Arroyo; 53 Joe Beimel; 34 Kris Benson; 71 Brian Boehringer; 39 Mike Fetters; 27 Josh Fogg; 57 Mike Lincoln; 48 Sean Lowe; 49 Josías Manzanillo; 46 Brian Meadows; 39 Al Reyes; 45 Duaner Sánchez; 47 Scott Sauerbeck; 31 Salomón Torres; 28 Ron Villone; 32 Kip Wells; 58 Dave Williams; 43 Mike Williams	Catchers: 11 Humberto Cota; 18 Jason Kendall; 15 Keith Osik; 36 Craig Wilson; Infielders: 6 Mike Benjamin; 38 Adam Hyzdu; 17 Mendy López; 59 Rob Mackowiak; 10 Abraham Núñez; 16 Aramis Ramírez; 3 Pokey Reese; 12 Jack Wilson; 29 Kevin Young	Outfielders: 56 Tony Álvarez; 13 Adrian Brown; 26 J. J. Davis; 24 Brian Giles; 31 Chad Hermansen; 7 Armando Ríos	Manager: 23 Lloyd McClendon; Coaches: 35 Dave Clark (hitting); 44 Trent Jewett (third base); 37 Tommy Sandt (first base); 52 Bruce Tanner (bullpen); 19 Bill Virdon (bench); 54 Spin Williams (pitching)

=== Opening Day lineup ===
Opening Day Starters
Name	Position
Adrian Brown	CF
Jason Kendall	C
Aramis Ramírez	3B
Kevin Young	1B
Armando Ríos	LF
Craig Wilson	RF
Mike Benjamin	SS
Pokey Reese	2B
Ron Villone	SP

== Awards and honors ==
2002 Major League Baseball All-Star Game

- Mike Williams, P, reserve

== Statistics ==
Hitting

Note: G = Games played; AB = At bats; H = Hits; Avg. = Batting average; HR = Home runs; RBI = Runs batted in

Regular season
Player	G	AB	H	Avg.	HR	RBI
T. Álvarez	14	26	8	0.308	1	2
J. Beimel	51	10	3	0.300	0	1
B. Giles	153	497	148	0.298	38	103
H. Cota	7	17	5	0.294	0	0
J. Kendall	145	545	154	0.283	3	44
A. Ríos	76	208	55	0.264	1	24
P. Reese	119	421	111	0.264	4	50
J. Wilson	131	368	97	0.264	16	57
C. Wilson	147	527	133	0.252	4	47
R. Villone	44	16	4	0.250	0	1
K. Young	146	468	115	0.246	16	51
R. Mackowiak	136	385	94	0.244	16	48
A. Ramírez	142	522	122	0.234	18	71
A. Núñez	112	253	59	0.233	2	15
A. Hyzdu	59	155	36	0.232	11	34
A. Brown	91	208	45	0.216	1	21
C. Hermansen	65	194	40	0.206	7	15
K. Wells	34	63	12	0.190	1	5
K. Benson	26	40	7	0.175	0	1
K. Osik	55	100	16	0.160	2	11
S. Torres	5	13	2	0.154	0	0
M. Benjamin	108	120	18	0.150	0	3
M. Williams	10	16	2	0.125	1	3
J. Fogg	32	58	7	0.121	0	1
J. Anderson	27	42	5	0.119	0	1
J. Davis	9	10	1	0.100	0	0
S. Lowe	42	13	1	0.077	0	0
B. Arroyo	9	6	0	0.000	0	0
M. Lincoln	53	5	0	0.000	0	0
M. López	3	3	0	0.000	0	0
B. Meadows	11	18	0	0.000	0	1
S. Sauerbeck	74	2	0	0.000	0	0
D. Williams	57	1	0	0.000	0	0
B. Boehringer	66	0	0	—	0	0
M. Fetters	30	0	0	—	0	0
J. Manzanillo	13	0	0	—	0	0
A. Reyes	15	0	0	—	0	0
D. Sánchez	3	0	0	—	0	0
Team totals	161	5,330	1,300	0.244	142	610

Pitching

Note: G = Games pitched; IP = Innings pitched; W = Wins; L = Losses; ERA = Earned run average; SO = Strikeouts

Regular season
Player	G	IP	W	L	ERA	SO
S. Sauerbeck	78	62 2/3	5	4	2.30	70
A. Reyes	15	17	0	0	2.65	21
S. Torres	5	30	2	1	2.70	12
D. Williams	59	61 1/3	2	6	2.93	43
M. Lincoln	55	72 1/3	2	4	3.11	50
M. Fetters	32	30 1/3	1	0	3.26	29
B. Boehringer	70	79 2/3	4	4	3.39	65
K. Wells	33	198 1/3	12	14	3.58	134
B. Meadows	11	62 2/3	1	6	3.88	31
B. Arroyo	9	27	2	1	4.00	22
J. Fogg	33	194 1/3	12	12	4.35	113
J. Beimel	53	85 1/3	2	5	4.64	53
K. Benson	25	130 1/3	9	6	4.70	79
M. Williams	9	43 1/3	2	5	4.98	33
S. Lowe	43	69	4	2	5.35	57
J. Anderson	28	140 2/3	8	13	5.44	47
R. Villone	45	93	4	6	5.81	55
J. Manzanillo	13	13	0	0	7.62	4
D. Sánchez	3	2 1/3	0	0	15.43	2
Team totals	161	1,412 2/3	72	89	4.23	920

== Draft picks ==
2002 Top 10 Rounds Draft Picks
Rd	#	Player	Pos	DOB and Age	School
1	1	Bryan Bullington	RHP	September 30, 1980 (aged 21)	Ball State University (Muncie, Indiana)
2	42	Blair Johnson	RHP	March 25, 1984 (aged 18)	Washburn Rural HS (Topeka, Kansas)
3	73	Taber Lee	SS	October 18, 1980 (aged 21)	San Diego State University (San Diego, California)
4	103	Wardell Starling	RHP	March 14, 1983 (aged 19)	Lawrence E Elkins HS (Missouri City, Texas)
5	133	Alex Hart	RHP	January 10, 1980 (aged 22)	University of Florida (Gainesville, Florida)
6	163	Brad Eldred	1B	July 12, 1980 (aged 21)	Florida International University (Miami, Florida)
7	193	Matt Capps	RHP	September 3, 1983 (aged 18)	Alexander HS (Douglasville, Georgia)
8	223	Bobby Kingsbury	OF	August 30, 1980 (aged 21)	Fordham University (New York City)
9	253	Joe Hicks	OF	April 22, 1984 (aged 18)	Forest Brook HS (Houston, Texas)
10	283	David Davidson	LHP	April 23, 1984 (aged 18)	Denis Morris HS (St. Catharines, ON)

Note

- Age at time of draft.

== Farm system ==
Level	Team	League	Manager
AAA	Nashville Sounds	Pacific Coast League	Marty Brown
AA	Altoona Curve	Eastern League	Dale Sveum
A	Lynchburg Hillcats	Carolina League	Pete Mackanin
A	Hickory Crawdads	South Atlantic League	Tony Beasley
A-Short Season	Williamsport Crosscutters	New York–Penn League	Andy Stewart
Rookie	GCL Pirates	Gulf Coast League	Woody Huyke

LEAGUE CHAMPIONS: Lynchburg, Hickory
