= 2002 Cincinnati Reds season =

2002 Cincinnati Reds
- League: National League
- Division: Central
- Ballpark: Cinergy Field
- City: Cincinnati
- Record: 78–84 (.481)
- Divisional place: 3rd
- Owners: Carl Lindner
- General managers: Jim Bowden
- Managers: Bob Boone
- Television: FSN Ohio (George Grande, Chris Welsh)
- Radio: WLW (Marty Brennaman, Joe Nuxhall)
- Stats: ESPN.com; Baseball Reference

The 2002 Cincinnati Reds season was the 133rd season for the franchise in Major League Baseball. It consisted of the Reds finishing with a 78-84 record to finish in third place in the National League Central, 19 games behind the St. Louis Cardinals. The Reds were managed by Bob Boone. The 2002 Reds season was their final one in Cinergy Field.

== Offseason ==
- January 7, 2002: José Rijo was signed as a free agent by the Reds.

== Regular season ==
=== Season standings ===
==== National League Central ====
NL Central
Team	W	L	Pct.	GB	Home	Road
St. Louis Cardinals	97	65	.599	—	52‍–‍29	45‍–‍36
Houston Astros	84	78	.519	13	47‍–‍34	37‍–‍44
Cincinnati Reds	78	84	.481	19	38‍–‍43	40‍–‍41
Pittsburgh Pirates	72	89	.447	24½	38‍–‍42	34‍–‍47
Chicago Cubs	67	95	.414	30	36‍–‍45	31‍–‍50
Milwaukee Brewers	56	106	.346	41	31‍–‍50	25‍–‍56

==== Record vs. opponents ====
2002 National League record Source: MLB Standings Grid – 2002
Team	AZ	ATL	CHC	CIN	COL	FLA	HOU	LAD	MIL	MON	NYM	PHI	PIT	SD	SF	STL	AL
Arizona	—	3–3	4–2	6–0	14–5	5–1	3–3	9–10	4–2	4–2	5–2	4–3	4–2	12–7	8–11	2–4	11–7
Atlanta	3–3	—	4–2	4–2	4–3	11–8	3–3	2–4	5–1	13–6	12–7	11–7	3–3	3–3	3–3–1	5–1	15–3
Chicago	2–4	2–4	—	5–12	4–2	4–2	8–11	2–4	7–10	3–3	1–5	2–4	10–9	2–4	3–3	6–12	6–6
Cincinnati	0–6	2–4	12–5	—	3–3	5–1	6–11	4–2	13–6	1–5	2–4	2–4	11–7	5–1	2–4	8–11	2–10
Colorado	5–14	3–4	2–4	3–3	—	5–2	3–3	7–12	3–3	4–2	3–3	3–3	4–2	11–8	8–12	2–4	7–11
Florida	1–5	8–11	2–4	1–5	2–5	—	3–3	3–3	4–2	10–9	8–11	10–9	4–2	5–1	4–3	4–2	10–8
Houston	3–3	3–3	11–8	11–6	3–3	3–3	—	3–3	10–8	3–3	4–2	3–3	11–6	4–2	1–5	6–13	5–7
Los Angeles	10–9	4–2	4–2	2–4	12–7	3–3	3–3	—	5–1	5–2	4–2	4–3	4–2	10–9	8–11	2–4	12–6
Milwaukee	2–4	1–5	10–7	6–13	3–3	2–4	8–10	1–5	—	2–4	1–5	1–5	4–15	5–1	1–5	7–10	2–10
Montreal	2–4	6–13	3–3	5–1	2–4	9–10	3–3	2–5	4–2	—	11–8	11–8	3–3	3–4	4–2	3–3	12–6
New York	2–5	7–12	5–1	4–2	3–3	11–8	2–4	2–4	5–1	8–11	—	9–10	1–4	3–4	0–6	3–3	10–8
Philadelphia	3–4	7–11	4–2	4–2	3–3	9–10	3–3	3–4	5–1	8–11	10–9	—	2–4	2–4	3–3	4–2	10–8
Pittsburgh	2–4	3–3	9–10	7–11	2–4	2–4	6–11	2–4	15–4	3–3	4–1	4–2	—	2–4	2–4	6–11	3–9
San Diego	7–12	3–3	4–2	1–5	8–11	1–5	2–4	9–10	1–5	4–3	4–3	4–2	4–2	—	5–14	1–5	8–10
San Francisco	11–8	3–3–1	3–3	4–2	11–8	3–4	5–1	11–8	5–1	2–4	6–0	3–3	4–2	14–5	—	2–4	8–10
St. Louis	4–2	1–5	12–6	11–8	4–2	2–4	13–6	4–2	10–7	3–3	3–3	2–4	11–6	5–1	4–2	—	8–4

=== Notable transactions ===
- June 7, 2002: Ben Broussard was traded by the Reds to the Cleveland Indians for Russell Branyan.

=== Roster ===
2002 Cincinnati Reds
**Roster**
**Pitchers**: 29 José Acevedo; 59 Carlos Almanzar; 53 Jim Brower; 52 Bruce Chen; 34 Ryan Dempster; 45 Elmer Dessens; 55 Shawn Estes; 53 Jared Fernández; 32 Danny Graves; 50 Joey Hamilton; 43 Jimmy Haynes; 54 Luke Hudson; 38 Brian Moehler; 49 Luis Pineda; 41 Chris Reitsma; 46 John Riedling; 27 José Rijo; 39 José Silva; 56 Scott Sullivan; 36 Gabe White; 48 Scott Williamson	**Catchers**: 23 Jason LaRue; 37 Corky Miller; 31 Kelly Stinnett; **Infielders**: 17 Aaron Boone; 21 Sean Casey; 7 Juan Castro; 3 Gookie Dawkins; 6 Wilton Guerrero; 11 Barry Larkin; 16 Brandon Larson; 12 Todd Walker	**Outfielders**: 33 Russell Branyan; 22 Brady Clark; 44 Adam Dunn; 34 Juan Encarnación; 29 Raúl González; 30 Ken Griffey Jr.; 6 José Guillén; 28 Austin Kearns; 15 Rubén Mateo; 26 Wily Mo Peña; 19 Reggie Taylor	**Manager**: 9 Bob Boone; **Coaches**: 2 José Cardenal (first base); 25 Ray Knight (bench); 10 Tim Foli (third base); 35 Don Gullett (pitching); 47 Tom Hume (bullpen); 4 Jim Lefebvre (hitting)

=== Game log ===
2002 regular season game log: 78–84 (Home: 38–43; Away: 40–41)
April: 16–9 (Home: 9–6; Away: 7–2)

#	Date	Opponent	Score	Win	Loss	Save	Attendance	Record	Box	Streak
1	April 1	Cubs	5–4	**Graves**	Fassero	—	41,913	1–0		W1
2	April 3	Cubs	3–10	Wood	**Dessens**	—	19,745	1–1		L1
3	April 4	Cubs	3–1	**Acevedo**	Cruz	**Graves**	16,448	2–1		W1
4	April 5	Expos	7–8	Yoshii	**Haynes**	Lloyd	17,123	2–2		L1
5	April 6	Expos	2–5	Ohka	**Pineda**	Lloyd	18,176	2–3		L2
6	April 7	Expos	6–5	**Sullivan**	Lloyd	—	17,549	3–3		W1
7	April 8	at Pirates	0–1	Villone	**Dessens**	Williams	36,402	3–4		L1
8	April 10	at Pirates	8–5	**Acevedo**	Wells	**Graves**	36,048	4–4		W1
9	April 11	at Pirates	3–2	**Haynes**	Anderson	**Graves**	12,795	5–4		W2
10	April 12	at Phillies	8–5	**Brower**	Cormier	**Graves**	13,366	6–4		W3
11	April 13	at Phillies	5–2	**Hamilton**	Person	**Graves**	15,606	7–4		W4
12	April 14	at Phillies	1–3	Padilla	**Dessens**	Mesa	19,195	7–5		L1
13	April 16	Astros	3–8	Mlicki	**Acevedo**	—	15,853	7–6		L2
14	April 17	Astros	2–7	Hernández	**Haynes**	—	14,527	7–7		L3
15	April 18	Astros	5–4	**White**	Cruz	—	15,848	8–7		W1
16	April 19	at Cubs	2–5	Clement	**Hamilton**	Alfonseca	33,949	8–8		L1
17	April 20	at Cubs	6–1	**Dessens**	Wood	—	36,476	9–8		W1
18	April 21	at Cubs	5–3	**Rijo**	Cruz	**Graves**	29,458	10–8		W2
19	April 23	Rockies	3–2	**Haynes**	Jennings	**Graves**	14,518	11–8		W3
20	April 24	Rockies	4–3	**Williamson**	Jiménez	—	13,004	12–8		W4
21	April 25	Rockies	4–3	**Sullivan**	White	**Graves**	14,416	13–8		W5
22	April 26	Giants	4–3	**Sullivan**	Rodríguez	**Graves**	28,341	14–8		W6
23	April 27	Giants	8–4	**Rijo**	Jensen	—	22,616	15–8		W7
24	April 28	Giants	4–5	Rueter	**Haynes**	Nen	23,426	15–9		L1
25	April 30	at Dodgers	3–1	**Reitsma**	Brown	**Graves**	25, 178	16–9		W1

May: 0–0 (Home: 0–0; Away: 0–0)

#	Date	Opponent	Score	Win	Loss	Save	Attendance	Record	Box	Streak
26	May 1	at Los Angeles Dodgers	4–0	Hamilton	Nomo		23,346	17–9		W2
27	May 2	at Los Angeles Dodgers	2–3	Carrara	Pineda		27,224	17–10	L1	
28	May 3	at San Francisco Giants	1–6	Rueter	Rijo		39,845	17–11		L2
29	May 4	at San Francisco Giants	0–3	Jensen	Haynes	Nen	40,959	17–12		L3
30	May 5	at San Francisco Giants	5–6	Nen	Pineda		41,263	17–13		L4
31	May 6	Milwaukee Brewers	8–5	Brower	Quevedo	Graves	12,867	18–13		W1
32	May 7	Milwaukee Brewers	8-2	Dessens	Rusch	16,167				
33	Wednesday, May 8	2002 Milwaukee Brewers season	14-5	Acevedo	Neugebauer	15,691				
34	May 10	St. Louis Cardinals season	2-4	Stechschulte	White	Isringhausen	29,008			
35	May 11	St. Louis Cardinals season	8-1	Reitsm	Kile		25,006			
36	May 12	St. Louis Cardinals season	8-10	Stechschulte	Graves	Isringhausen	20,622			
37	May 13	@Milwaukee Brewers	5-0	Rijo	Cabrera	14,844 +				
38	May 14	@Milwaukee Brewers	Acevedo	Quevedo	Graves	15,546				
39	May 15	Milwaukee Brewers|7-4	Haynes	Stull	Graves	15,561				
40	May 16	Milwaukee Brewers	2-1	White	DeJean	Graves		18,456		
41	May 17	@St. Louis Cardinals season	1-3	Kile	Sullivan	Isringhausen	36,103			
42	May 18	St. Louis Cardinals season	7-3	Rijo	Morris	40,483				
43	May 19	@ St. Louis Cardinals season1-10	Stephenson	Acevedo	42,992					
44	May 20	St. Louis Cardinals season	3-7	Williams	Haynes	35,560				
45	May 21	Florida Gators	6-1	Reitsma	Burnett Graves	16,841				
46	May 22	Florida Gators	6-2	Dessens	Dempster	20,314				
47	May 23	Florida Gators	4-8	Tavarez	Rijo	Nunez	23,134 -			
48	May 24	@Atlanta Braves	2-11	Millwood	Hamilton	29,307				
49	May 25	@ Atlanta Braves	6-4	Marquis	Graves	44,026				
50	May 26	Atlanta Braves	5-7 Maddux	Reitsma	40,142 -					
51	May 28	@ Florida Marlinss	6-5	Graves	Nunez	7,386				
52	May 29	@ Florida Marlins	8-2	Hamilton	Beckett	6,836				
53	May 30	Florida Marlins	W-4-1	Haynes	Olsen	Graves	6,140			
54	May 31	Atlanta Braves	0-7	Maddux	Reitsma	38,777 -				

Legend: = Win = Loss = Postponement
Bold = Reds team member

== Player stats ==
=== Batting ===
==== Starters by position ====
Note: Pos = Position; G = Games played; AB = At bats; H = Hits; Avg. = Batting average; HR = Home runs; RBI = Runs batted in

Pos	Player	G	AB	H	Avg.	HR	RBI
C	Jason LaRue	113	353	88	.249	12	52
1B	Sean Casey	120	425	111	.261	6	42
2B	Todd Walker	155	612	183	.299	11	64
SS	Barry Larkin	145	507	124	.245	7	47
3B	Aaron Boone	162	606	146	.241	26	87
LF	Adam Dunn	158	535	133	.249	26	71
CF	Juan Encarnación	83	321	89	.277	16	51
RF	Austin Kearns	107	372	117	.315	13	56

==== Other batters ====
Note: G = Games played; AB = At bats; H = Hits; Avg. = Batting average; HR = Home runs; RBI = Runs batted in

Player	G	AB	H	Avg.	HR	RBI
Reggie Taylor	135	287	73	.254	9	38
Russell Branyan	84	217	53	.244	16	39
Ken Griffey Jr.	70	197	52	.264	8	23
Corky Miller	39	114	29	.254	3	15
José Guillén	31	109	27	.248	4	16
Kelly Stinnett	34	93	21	.226	3	13
Rubén Mateo	46	86	22	.256	2	7
Juan Castro	54	82	18	.220	2	11
Wilton Guerrero	59	78	19	.244	0	4
Brady Clark	51	66	10	.152	0	9
Brandon Larson	23	51	14	.275	4	13
Travis Dawkins	31	48	6	.125	0	0
Raúl González	10	23	6	.261	0	1
Wily Mo Peña	13	18	4	.222	1	1

=== Pitching ===
==== Starting pitchers ====
Note: G = Games pitched; IP = Innings pitched; W = Wins; L = Losses; ERA = Earned run average; SO = Strikeouts

Player	G	IP	W	L	ERA	SO
Jimmy Haynes	34	196.2	15	10	4.12	126
Elmer Dessens	30	178.0	7	8	3.03	93
Ryan Dempster	15	88.2	5	5	6.19	66
Brian Moehler	10	43.1	2	4	6.02	18
Shawn Estes	6	28.0	1	3	7.71	17
José Acevedo	6	23.2	4	2	7.23	14

==== Other pitchers ====
Note: G = Games pitched; IP = Innings pitched; W = Wins; L = Losses; ERA = Earned run average; SO = Strikeouts

Player	G	IP	W	L	ERA	SO
Chris Reitsma	32	138.1	6	12	3.64	84
Joey Hamilton	39	124.2	4	10	5.27	85
José Rijo	31	77.0	5	4	5.14	38
Jared Fernández	14	50.2	1	3	4.44	36

==== Relief pitchers ====
Note: G = Games pitched; W = Wins; L = Losses; SV = Saves; ERA = Earned run average; SO = Strikeouts

Player	G	W	L	SV	ERA	SO
Danny Graves	68	7	3	32	3.19	58
Scott Sullivan	71	6	5	1	6.06	78
Scott Williamson	63	3	4	8	2.92	84
Gabe White	62	6	1	0	2.98	41
Bruce Chen	39	0	2	0	4.31	37
John Riedling	33	2	4	0	2.70	30
Luis Pineda	26	1	3	0	4.18	31
Jim Brower	22	2	0	0	3.89	24
José Silva	12	1	0	0	4.24	6
Carlos Almanzar	8	0	1	0	2.31	7
Luke Hudson	3	0	0	0	4.50	7

== Farm system ==
Level	Team	League	Manager
AAA	Louisville Bats	International League	Dave Miley
AA	Chattanooga Lookouts	Southern League	Phillip Wellman
A	Stockton Ports	California League	Jayhawk Owens
A	Dayton Dragons	Midwest League	Donnie Scott
Rookie	GCL Reds	Gulf Coast League	Edgar Caceres
Rookie	Billings Mustangs	Pioneer League	Rick Burleson

LEAGUE CHAMPIONS: Stockton
