= 2002 Arizona Diamondbacks season =

2002 Arizona Diamondbacks
- National League West champions
- League: National League
- Division: West
- Ballpark: Bank One Ballpark
- City: Phoenix, Arizona
- Record: 98–64 (.605)
- Divisional place: 1st
- Owners: Ken Kendrick; Jerry Colangelo
- General managers: Joe Garagiola Jr.
- Managers: Bob Brenly
- Television: FSN Arizona; KTVK (3TV) (Thom Brennaman, Rod Allen, Greg Schulte, Joe Garagiola)
- Radio: KTAR (620 AM) (Rod Allen, Greg Schulte, Jim Traber, Victor Rojas Jeff Munn); KSUN (Spanish) (Richard Saenz, Oscar Soria, Miguel Quintana)
- Stats: ESPN.com; Baseball Reference

The 2002 Arizona Diamondbacks season was the franchise's 5th season in Major League Baseball and their 5th season at Bank One Ballpark in Phoenix, Arizona, as members of the National League West.

The Diamondbacks entered the 2002 season as the defending World Series champions. They looked to contend in what was once again a strong National League West. They finished the season with a record of 98–64, good enough for the division title. However, they were unable to defend their World Series title as they were swept in the NLDS by the St. Louis Cardinals in three games. Randy Johnson would finish the season as the NL Cy Young Award winner for the fourth consecutive year and become the second pitcher in history to win five Cy Young Awards after Roger Clemens.

== Offseason ==
- October 29, 2001: Ken Huckaby was released by the Arizona Diamondbacks.
- January 9, 2002: Quinton McCracken was signed as a free agent with the Arizona Diamondbacks.
- March 24, 2002: Ernie Young was sent to the Arizona Diamondbacks by the St. Louis Cardinals as part of a conditional deal.

== Regular season ==
=== Luis Gonzalez ===
During the 2002 season, Luis Gonzalez received publicity as a piece of gum chewed by Gonzalez during a spring training game was sold for $10,000 on April 15, 2002. The buyer was Curt Mueller, owner of Mueller Sports Medicine Inc., manufacturer of the gum, Quench.

=== Opening Day starters ===
- Danny Bautista
- Craig Counsell
- Steve Finley
- Luis Gonzalez
- Mark Grace
- Randy Johnson
- Damian Miller
- Junior Spivey
- Tony Womack

=== Season standings ===
==== National League West ====
NL West
Team	W	L	Pct.	GB	Home	Road
Arizona Diamondbacks	98	64	.605	—	55‍–‍26	43‍–‍38
San Francisco Giants	95	66	.590	2½	50‍–‍31	45‍–‍35
Los Angeles Dodgers	92	70	.568	6	46‍–‍35	46‍–‍35
Colorado Rockies	73	89	.451	25	47‍–‍34	26‍–‍55
San Diego Padres	66	96	.407	32	41‍–‍40	25‍–‍56

==== Record vs. opponents ====
2002 National League record Source: MLB Standings Grid – 2002
Team	AZ	ATL	CHC	CIN	COL	FLA	HOU	LAD	MIL	MON	NYM	PHI	PIT	SD	SF	STL	AL
Arizona	—	3–3	4–2	6–0	14–5	5–1	3–3	9–10	4–2	4–2	5–2	4–3	4–2	12–7	8–11	2–4	11–7
Atlanta	3–3	—	4–2	4–2	4–3	11–8	3–3	2–4	5–1	13–6	12–7	11–7	3–3	3–3	3–3–1	5–1	15–3
Chicago	2–4	2–4	—	5–12	4–2	4–2	8–11	2–4	7–10	3–3	1–5	2–4	10–9	2–4	3–3	6–12	6–6
Cincinnati	0–6	2–4	12–5	—	3–3	5–1	6–11	4–2	13–6	1–5	2–4	2–4	11–7	5–1	2–4	8–11	2–10
Colorado	5–14	3–4	2–4	3–3	—	5–2	3–3	7–12	3–3	4–2	3–3	3–3	4–2	11–8	8–12	2–4	7–11
Florida	1–5	8–11	2–4	1–5	2–5	—	3–3	3–3	4–2	10–9	8–11	10–9	4–2	5–1	4–3	4–2	10–8
Houston	3–3	3–3	11–8	11–6	3–3	3–3	—	3–3	10–8	3–3	4–2	3–3	11–6	4–2	1–5	6–13	5–7
Los Angeles	10–9	4–2	4–2	2–4	12–7	3–3	3–3	—	5–1	5–2	4–2	4–3	4–2	10–9	8–11	2–4	12–6
Milwaukee	2–4	1–5	10–7	6–13	3–3	2–4	8–10	1–5	—	2–4	1–5	1–5	4–15	5–1	1–5	7–10	2–10
Montreal	2–4	6–13	3–3	5–1	2–4	9–10	3–3	2–5	4–2	—	11–8	11–8	3–3	3–4	4–2	3–3	12–6
New York	2–5	7–12	5–1	4–2	3–3	11–8	2–4	2–4	5–1	8–11	—	9–10	1–4	3–4	0–6	3–3	10–8
Philadelphia	3–4	7–11	4–2	4–2	3–3	9–10	3–3	3–4	5–1	8–11	10–9	—	2–4	2–4	3–3	4–2	10–8
Pittsburgh	2–4	3–3	9–10	7–11	2–4	2–4	6–11	2–4	15–4	3–3	4–1	4–2	—	2–4	2–4	6–11	3–9
San Diego	7–12	3–3	4–2	1–5	8–11	1–5	2–4	9–10	1–5	4–3	4–3	4–2	4–2	—	5–14	1–5	8–10
San Francisco	11–8	3–3–1	3–3	4–2	11–8	3–4	5–1	11–8	5–1	2–4	6–0	3–3	4–2	14–5	—	2–4	8–10
St. Louis	4–2	1–5	12–6	11–8	4–2	2–4	13–6	4–2	10–7	3–3	3–3	2–4	11–6	5–1	4–2	—	8–4

=== Roster ===
2002 Arizona Diamondbacks
Roster
Pitchers: 34 Brian Anderson; 43 Miguel Batista; 39 Mike Fetters; 32 Rick Helling; 51 Randy Johnson; 49 Byung-hyun Kim; 58 Mike Koplove; 31 Matt Mantei; 36 Mike Morgan; 35 Mike Myers; 47 Eddie Oropesa; 52 José Parra; 24 John Patterson; 41 Bret Prinz; 27 Armando Reynoso; 52 Duaner Sánchez; 38 Curt Schilling; 30 Todd Stottlemyre; 22 Greg Swindell	Catchers: 48 Rod Barajas; 26 Damian Miller; 16 Chad Moeller; Infielders: 33 Jay Bell; 10 Alex Cintrón; 28 Greg Colbrunn; 4 Craig Counsell; 18 Chris Donnels; 44 Erubiel Durazo; 17 Mark Grace; 7 Danny Klassen; 37 Junior Spivey; 9 Matt Williams; 5 Tony Womack	Outfielders: 29 Danny Bautista; 25 David Dellucci; 12 Steve Finley; 20 Luis Gonzalez; 11 José Guillén; 8 Félix José; 11 Mark Little; 6 Quinton McCracken; Other batters: 23 Lyle Overbay	Manager: 15 Bob Brenly; Coaches: 50 Chuck Kniffin (Pitching); 3 Bob Melvin (Bench); 21 Dwayne Murphy (Hitting); 14 Eddie Rodríguez (3rd Base); 53 Glenn Sherlock (Bullpen); 19 Robin Yount (1st Base)

=== Transactions ===
- June 3, 2002: Ernie Young was released by the Arizona Diamondbacks.
- September 4, 2002: Félix José was purchased by the Arizona Diamondbacks from the Mexico City Reds (Mexican).

== Player stats ==
=== Batting ===
Note: Pos = Position; G = Games played; AB = At bats; H = Hits; HR = Home runs; RBI = Runs batted in; Avg. = Batting average

Pos	Player	G	AB	H	HR	RBI	Avg.
C	Damian Miller	101	297	74	11	42	.249
1B	Mark Grace	124	298	75	7	48	.252
2B	Junior Spivey	143	538	162	16	78	.301
SS	Tony Womack	153	590	160	5	57	.271
3B	Craig Counsell	112	436	123	2	51	.282
LF	Luis Gonzalez	148	524	151	28	103	.288
CF	Steve Finley	150	505	145	25	89	.287
RF	Quinton McCracken	123	349	108	3	40	.309

==== Other batters ====
Note: Pos = Position; G = Games played; AB = At bats; H = Hits; HR = Home runs; RBI = Runs batted in; Avg. = Batting average

Pos	Player	G	AB	H	HR	RBI	Avg.
RF	David Dellucci	97	229	56	7	29	.245
1B	Erubiel Durazo	76	222	58	16	48	.261
3B	Matt Williams	60	215	56	12	40	.260
1B	Greg Colbrunn	72	171	57	10	27	.333
C	Rod Barajas	70	154	36	3	23	.234
RF	Danny Bautista	40	154	50	6	23	.325
RF	José Guillén	54	131	30	4	15	.229
C	Chad Moeller	37	105	30	2	16	.286
3B	Chris Donnels	74	80	19	3	16	.238
MI	Alex Cintrón	38	75	16	0	4	.213
IF	Jay Bell	32	49	8	2	11	.163
OF	Mark Little	15	22	6	0	2	.273
RF	Félix José	13	19	5	2	4	.263
PH	Lyle Overbay	10	10	1	0	1	.100
IF	Danny Klassen	4	3	1	0	0	.333

=== Starting pitchers ===
Note: G = Games; IP = Innings pitched; W = Wins; L = Losses; ERA = Earned run average; SO = Strikeouts

Player	G	IP	W	L	ERA	SO
Randy Johnson	35	260.0	24	5	2.32	334
Curt Schilling	36	259.1	23	7	3.23	316
Miguel Batista	36	184.2	8	9	4.29	112
Rick Helling	30	175.2	10	12	4.51	120
Brian Anderson	35	156.0	6	11	4.79	81

==== Other pitchers ====
Note: G = Games; IP = Innings pitched; W = Wins; L = Losses; ERA = Earned run average; SO = Strikeouts

Player	G	IP	W	L	ERA	SO
John Patterson	7	30.2	2	0	3.23	31
Todd Stottlemyre	5	20.1	0	2	7.52	12

===== Relief pitchers =====
Note: G = Games; IP = Innings pitched; W = Wins; L = Losses; SV = Saves; ERA = Earned run average; SO = Strikeouts

Player	G	IP	W	L	SV	ERA	SO
Byung-hyun Kim	72	84.0	8	3	36	2.04	92
Mike Koplove	55	61.2	6	1	0	3.36	46
Mike Myers	69	37.0	4	3	4	4.38	31
Mike Morgan	29	34.0	1	1	0	5.29	13
Greg Swindell	34	33.0	0	2	0	6.27	23
Matt Mantei	31	26.2	2	2	0	4.73	26
Eddie Oropesa	32	25.1	2	0	0	10.30	18
Mike Fetters	33	24.2	2	3	0	5.11	24
José Parra	16	14.0	0	1	0	3.21	8
Bret Prinz	20	13.1	0	2	0	9.45	10
Duaner Sánchez	6	3.2	0	0	0	4.91	4
Armando Reynoso	2	1.2	0	0	0	10.80	2
Mark Grace	1	1.0	0	0	0	9.00	0

== NLDS ==
St. Louis wins the series, 3–0

Game	Home	Score	Visitor	Score	Date	Stadium	Series
1	Arizona	2	St. Louis	12	October 1	BankOne Ballpark	1–0 (STL)
2	Arizona	1	St. Louis	2	October 3	BankOne Ballpark	2–0 (STL)
3	St. Louis	6	Arizona	3	October 5	Busch Stadium	3–0 (STL)

== Farm system ==
Level	Team	League	Manager
AAA	Tucson Sidewinders	Pacific Coast League	Al Pedrique
AA	El Paso Diablos	Texas League	Chip Hale
A	Lancaster JetHawks	California League	Steve Scarsone and Bill Plummer
A	South Bend Silver Hawks	Midwest League	Dick Schofield
A-Short Season	Yakima Bears	Northwest League	Mike Aldrete
Rookie	Missoula Osprey	Pioneer League	Jack Howell
