= Bud Smith =

American baseball player (born 1979)

- Pitcher
- Born: October 23, 1979 (age 47); Torrance, California, U.S.
- Batted: Left Threw: Left

MLB debut
- June 10, 2001, for the St. Louis Cardinals

Last MLB appearance
- July 19, 2002, for the St. Louis Cardinals

MLB statistics
- Win–loss record: 7–8
- Earned run average: 4.95
- Strikeouts: 81
- Stats at Baseball Reference

Teams
- St. Louis Cardinals (2001–2002)

Career highlights and awards
- Pitched a no-hitter on September 3, 2001

Robert Allan "Bud" Smith (born October 23, 1979) is an American former professional baseball pitcher. He played in Major League Baseball (MLB) for St. Louis Cardinals from 2001 to 2002. He is best known for throwing a no-hitter on September 3, 2001.

== Minor leagues ==
In 2000, Smith led the minor league Cardinal organization with a 2.26 ERA (among starters) and 17 wins (five with AAA Memphis and 12 with AA Arkansas) and threw two no-hitters of the seven-inning variety against Midland and San Antonio. His 2000-year performance earned him Baseball Weekly's Minor League Pitcher of the Year award.

== No-hitter and major league career ==
Smith's major league career was short but notable, as he became the 18th rookie since 1900 to throw a no-hitter. Smith's Cardinals defeated the San Diego Padres 4–0 on September 3, 2001, with the rookie hurler giving up four walks but no hits, while throwing 134 pitches in the game. Due to Smith's high pitch count entering the later innings, Cardinal pitching coach Dave Duncan was actually hoping someone would break up the no-hitter, fearing that his young pitcher might tire, although he went against that judgment in allowing Smith to finish the game. As of February 2026, Smith's is the most recent no-hitter by a Cardinals' pitcher.

Smith had an impressive rookie season in 2001, compiling a 6–3 record and a 3.83 earned run average in 16 games, good for fourth in Rookie of the Year voting. However, after posting a dreadful 6.94 era in his sophomore season, he never pitched at the major league level again.

Smith has the distinction of being the last member of the Cardinals to wear the number 51. In his major league debut, he donned the number associated with retired fan favorite Willie McGee, upsetting many fans. Shortly thereafter, Smith agreed to change his number to 52, and no one has used 51 since.

For his career, Smith was 7–8 with a 4.95 earned run average in 132.7 innings. He made 27 appearances with 24 starts, with the no-hitter being his only complete game shutout.

On July 29, 2002, he was traded to the Philadelphia Phillies along with infielder Plácido Polanco and relief pitcher Mike Timlin for third baseman Scott Rolen, relief pitcher Doug Nickle and cash. Smith never made a major league appearance for the Phillies, and on October 15, 2004, was granted free agency. He later signed with the Minnesota Twins on December 14, 2004.

== Post-major league career ==
Smith was most recently a member of the Long Beach Armada of the independent Golden Baseball League in 2007 until retiring from baseball.

== See also ==
- List of Major League Baseball no-hitters

Preceded by A. J. Burnett	No-hitter pitcher September 3, 2001	Succeeded by Derek Lowe
