= Matt Duff =

American baseball player (born 1974)

- Pitcher
- Born: October 6, 1974 (age 50); Clarksdale, Mississippi
- Batted: Right Threw: Right

MLB debut
- July 30, 2002, for the St. Louis Cardinals

Last MLB appearance
- August 13, 2002, for the St. Louis Cardinals

MLB statistics
- Win–loss record: 0–0
- Earned run average: 4.76
- Strikeouts: 4

Teams
- St. Louis Cardinals (2002)

Matthew Clark Duff (born October 6, 1974) is a former Major League Baseball pitcher and hunter.

Duff grew up in Alligator, Mississippi. He appeared in seven games for the St. Louis Cardinals in 2002.

As of 2011, he was running a bowhunting business and appearing in such shows as Buck Commander and Major League Bowhunter, which he owned and co-hosted. In January 2011, Duff began co-hosting the Friends of NRA TV show on the Outdoor Channel alongside Jessie Duff, who he married thirteen months later.
