= Kevin Joseph (baseball) =

American baseball player (born 1976)

- Pitcher
- Born: August 1, 1976 (age 49); Camp Hill, Pennsylvania, U.S.
- Batted: Right Threw: Right

MLB debut
- August 1, 2002, for the St. Louis Cardinals

Last MLB appearance
- August 25, 2002, for the St. Louis Cardinals

MLB statistics
- Win–loss record: 0–1
- Earned run average: 4.91
- Strikeouts: 2
- Stats at Baseball Reference

Teams
- St. Louis Cardinals (2002)

Kevin Joseph (born August 1, 1976) is an American former professional baseball pitcher who last played professional baseball in 2003. Joseph attended Rice University, which has had many alumni become Major Leaguers.

== Career ==
In 1997, he was drafted by the San Francisco Giants in the 6th round (178th overall). He started his professional career that same year in A-ball. Over the years, he found his niche as a relief pitcher, posting minor league ERAs as low as 1.42 and 1.77.

By the time he made his Major League debut at age 25 in 2002 with the St. Louis Cardinals (the Giants traded him earlier that year for Jason Christiansen), he was already a veteran minor leaguer. He had a very small chance to prove he was major league worthy, only appearing in 11 games that year. Joseph was quickly sent to the minors, where he spent one more season. In his final season, he made two stops in the minors, each winning only one game with each team.
