= Mike Crudale =

American baseball player (born 1977)

- Pitcher
- Born: January 3, 1977 (age 48); San Diego, California, U.S.
- Batted: Right Threw: Right

MLB debut
- April 10, 2002, for the St. Louis Cardinals

Last MLB appearance
- September 23, 2003, for the Milwaukee Brewers

MLB statistics
- Win–loss record: 3–1
- Earned run average: 2.09
- Strikeouts: 60
- Stats at Baseball Reference

Teams
- St. Louis Cardinals (2002–2003); Milwaukee Brewers (2003)

Michael Christopher Crudale (born January 3, 1977) is a former professional baseball pitcher. He played two seasons in Major League Baseball (MLB) for the St. Louis Cardinals and Milwaukee Brewers from 2002 to 2003.

== MLB career ==
Selected by the Cardinals in the 24th round of the 1999 amateur entry draft, Crudale played his first professional season with their Rookie League team, the Johnson City Cardinals in 1999. After moving up the Cardinals chain, Crudale made the big club out of spring training in 2002 and pitched well, with a 3–0 mark and a 1.88 ERA out of the bullpen (plus one start). Crudale spent most of the 2003 season with the Triple-A Memphis Redbirds, however, and was dealt in August to the Milwaukee Brewers, who released him in spring training in 2004. Dogged by injuries, he pitched poorly for minor league teams in the Pittsburgh Pirates and San Francisco Giants organizations later that season, ending his affiliated baseball career. (Ironically, his major league ERA was an excellent 2.09, less than half of his minor league mark of 4.38.)

== Later career ==
After leaving Organized Baseball, Crudale pitched three seasons for the independent Long Island Ducks of the Atlantic League from 2005 to 2007. Continuing his baseball career abroad, he played in Italy (De Angelis Godo Baseball) in 2007, then moved on to Taiwan with the CPBL's dmedia T-REX in 2008. He returned to Europe for his final season as a player with the Sanmarinese-Italian team T & A San Marino in 2009.

In 2008, Mike briefly worked as an instructor at Turn 2 sports training facility in Collinsville, Illinois; he now coaches the DBA Crushers (12-and-under) squad in Danville, California.

== In popular culture ==
The phrase "And Mike Crudale" has become something of an internet meme, starting as a running gag on the Baseball Think Factory website, often used to terminate a lengthy paragraph or mind-numbing list of trivia.
