= Chuck Kniffin =

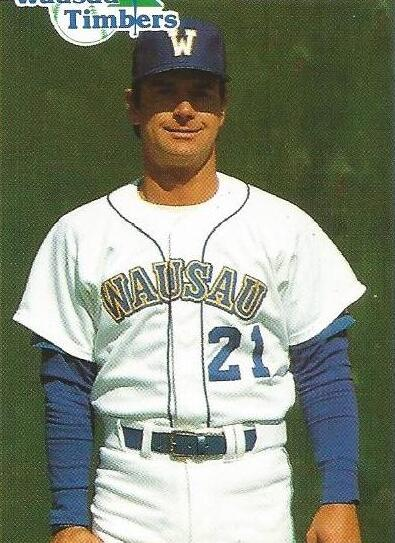
- Kniffin with the Wausau Timbers c. 1988
- Pitcher / Coach
- Born: October 28, 1950 (age 75); Rockville Center, New York, U.S.
- Bats: Right Throws: Left
- Stats at Baseball Reference

Teams
- As coach: Arizona Diamondbacks (2002–2004)

Charles Edward Kniffin (born October 28, 1950) is an American former professional baseball player and coach. Much of Kniffin's three-decade professional career was spent in minor league baseball, but he served 2½ seasons as the Major League pitching coach of the 2002–04 Arizona Diamondbacks on the staff of then-manager Bob Brenly.

Kniffin was born in Rockville Centre, New York. A 5 ft 11 in (1.80 m), 185 lb (84 kg) left-handed pitcher during his playing days, he was selected by the Philadelphia Phillies in the 25th round of the 1969 Major League Baseball draft out of Nassau Community College. He pitched for ten seasons in the Phillie farm system, compiling a 55–40 record in 244 appearances. Kniffin pitched through injury for much of his career and, by the time he stopped playing, his pitching elbow was "grotesquely misshapen."

After leaving affiliated ball, he settled in Colorado with his wife and got a job as a driver for UPS. In 1984, at the suggestion of a friend, he left his job with UPS to play a season of baseball in Italy. When he returned to the United States, he took a job as a pitching coach in the Seattle Mariners organization. He switched to the Montreal Expos' organization in the early 1990s, then to the Diamondbacks' farm system when that expansion team began play in 1998, serving such teams as the Harrisburg Senators, Ottawa Lynx and Tucson Sidewinders.

Kniffin succeeded Bob Welch as pitching coach of the defending 2001 World Series champion Diamondbacks in 2002, when Arizona won 98 games and the National League West Division title before falling in the Division Series. He worked on Brenly's staff until July 3, 2004, when both he and Brenly were fired in the midst of the rebuilding D-Backs' disastrous 51–111 season. Kniffin then served as pitching coach of the Triple-A Colorado Springs Sky Sox from 2006–09 until his retirement at the close of the 2009 minor league season.

Preceded by Bob Welch	Arizona Diamondbacks pitching coach 2002–2004	Succeeded by Mark Davis
