= Gene Stechschulte =

American baseball player (born 1973)

Ohio Northern Polar Bears
- Pitcher
- Born: August 12, 1973 (age 52); Lima, Ohio, U.S.
- Batted: Right Threw: Right

MLB debut
- April 20, 2000, for the St. Louis Cardinals

Last MLB appearance
- June 30, 2002, for the St. Louis Cardinals

MLB statistics
- Win–loss record: 8–7
- Earned run average: 4.58
- Strikeouts: 84
- Stats at Baseball Reference

Teams
- St. Louis Cardinals (2000–2002)

Eugene Urban Stechschulte (born August 12, 1973) is an American former Major League Baseball player from Kalida, Ohio, who pitched for the St. Louis Cardinals from 2000–2002. Stechschulte began his professional baseball career in the Cardinals' minor league system in 1996 as an undrafted free agent. In 1998, he led the league with 33 saves and 51 games finished in Peoria. In 1999, he led the Arkansas Travelers with 19 saves. In 2000, he was second in the Pacific Coast League with 26 saves.

On April 17, 2001, Stechschulte became one of few major leaguers to have homered on the first pitch ever thrown to him and the only pitcher to accomplish the feat as a pinch-hitter. On June 1, 2011, Stechschulte was named the Ohio Northern University baseball coach.

== See also ==
- List of Major League Baseball players with a home run in their first major league at bat
