= Travis Smith (baseball) =

American baseball player (born 1972)

- Pitcher
- Born: November 7, 1972 (age 53); Springfield, Oregon, U.S.
- Batted: Right Threw: Right

MLB debut
- June 21, 1998, for the Milwaukee Brewers

Last MLB appearance
- May 20, 2006, for the Atlanta Braves

MLB statistics
- Win–loss record: 6–6
- Earned run average: 6.53
- Strikeouts: 69
- Stats at Baseball Reference

Teams
- Milwaukee Brewers (1998); St. Louis Cardinals (2002); SK Wyverns (2003); Atlanta Braves (2004); Florida Marlins (2005); Atlanta Braves (2006)

Travis William Smith (born November 7, 1972) is an American former professional baseball pitcher. He pitched five seasons in Major League Baseball for the Milwaukee Brewers, St. Louis Cardinals, Atlanta Braves, and Florida Marlins. He also pitched one season for the SK Wyverns of the KBO League.

Smith played college baseball for the Texas Tech Red Raiders. He retired in 2007, while pitching for the Los Angeles Dodgers' Triple-A affiliate, the Las Vegas 51s.
