= Jason Simontacchi =

American baseball player (born 1973)

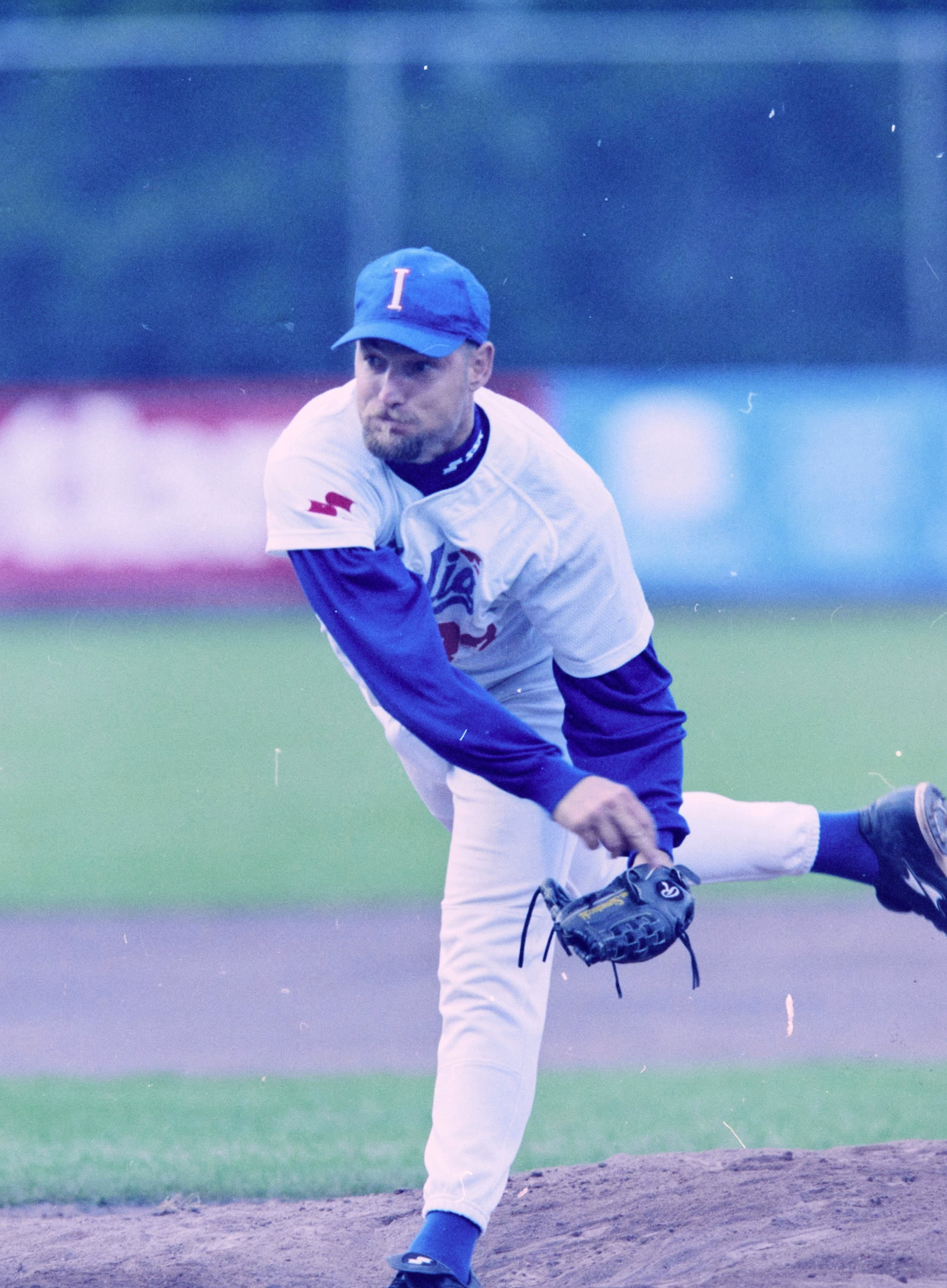
- Simontacchi with Italy in 2000
- Pitcher
- Born: November 13, 1973 (age 52); Mountain View, California, U.S.
- Batted: Right Threw: Right

MLB debut
- May 4, 2002, for the St. Louis Cardinals

Last MLB appearance
- July 15, 2007, for the Washington Nationals

MLB statistics
- Win–loss record: 26–17
- Earned run average: 5.09
- Strikeouts: 191
- Stats at Baseball Reference

Teams
- St. Louis Cardinals (2002–2004); Washington Nationals (2007)

Jason William Simontacchi (born November 13, 1973) is an American former baseball coach and pitcher. He was starting pitcher for four years in Major League Baseball, from 2002–2004 and 2007. He pitched in the minors from 1996–1999 and from 2001–2004, in the organizations of the Kansas City Royals (1996-1997), Pittsburgh Pirates (1999), Minnesota Twins (2001), and St. Louis Cardinals (2002–2004), where he made his major league debut. He also pitched for Italy in the 2000 Summer Olympics. He finished his pitching career in the independent leagues in 2008 and 2010.

He was a minor league pitching coach and coordinator for the Cardinals and Kansas City Royals.

== Playing career ==
=== College ===
After transferring from De Anza College, Simontacchi attended San Jose State University in the 1994–95 school year and pledged the Cal Iota chapter of the Phi Delta Theta fraternity as a member of the Alpha Theta pledge class. Simontacchi completed his collegiate baseball career at the College of Idaho.

=== Independent baseball and Italy ===
He was Pitcher of the Year in 1998 for the independent Frontier League champions, the Springfield Capitals, going 10–2 with an ERA of 2.95. He also played in the Italian Professional League for Rimini Baseball Club and went 12–1 with a 1.17 ERA in 2000, where he played well enough to make the roster for Italy at the 2000 Sydney Olympics, where he was the winning pitcher against South Africa, pitched in relief against the United States and was the losing pitcher against the Netherlands, finishing the Olympics with a 1.17 ERA and 10 strikeouts in 15 1/3 innings.

=== St. Louis Cardinals ===
Simontacchi had an ERA of 2.34 and a record of 5–1 in 2002 for the Triple-A Memphis Redbirds, a year in which he played mostly with the St. Louis Cardinals as a 28-year-old rookie. Through his first 13 starts with the Cardinals, he went 7–1 with a 2.82 ERA. He finished the season with an 11–5 record in 24 starts, and ninth in Rookie of the Year voting. In 2003, he was 9–5 as a part-time starter with 16 starts and an ERA of 5.56.

Simontacchi suffered right shoulder problems from a torn labrum in 2004, and was released by the Cardinals at the end of the year. He subsequently missed the entirety of the 2005 season.

=== Bridgeport Bluefish (2006) ===
Simontacchi considered playing for Italy at the 2006 World Baseball Classic but ultimately decided not to. He signed a minor-league deal with the Chicago Cubs for the 2006 season, but his contract was voided. However, he pitched 10 games in the independent Atlantic League for the Bridgeport Bluefish with an ERA of 0.84. He then pitched for the Estrellas Orientales in the Dominican winter league, and in his five starts went 3–1 with a 2.02 ERA over 27 innings.

=== Washington Nationals (2007) ===
In 2007, Simontacchi was a non-roster invitee to the Washington Nationals in spring training, and was projected to be in the Nationals starting rotation until a groin injury sidelined him. He rehabbed in Triple-A, and when starters Jerome Williams and John Patterson both went on the 15-day disabled list in the span of 10 days, he was called up and started against the Milwaukee Brewers on May 8. He pitched well until giving up a three-run home run in the sixth inning and then receiving the loss. In his second start, on May 13, 2007, he pitched 5 1/3 innings, and collected his first major league win since 2003. By mid-July, he was 6–7 with an ERA of 6.37. He experienced elbow soreness after a start on July 15, and five days later landed on the disabled list due to right elbow tendinitis. Simontacchi became a free agent at the end of the season.

=== Later career ===
Simontacchi pitched in the Independent Atlantic League in 2008 with the Long Island Ducks. He was a starting pitcher for the Lancaster Barnstormers of the Atlantic League during the 2010 season.

== Coaching career ==
In 2013, Simontacchi became the pitching coach with the Single-A Peoria Chiefs, a Cardinals affiliate. In 2014, he was promoted to the Springfield Cardinals, the Double-A affiliate of the Cardinals. Simontacchi then joined the Kansas City Royals organization as an assistant pitching coordinator in 2018, becoming a pitching coordinator in 2020, and leaving after the 2022 season.

Simontacchi was Italy's pitching coach in the 2023 World Baseball Classic.
