= Jimmy Anderson (baseball) =

American baseball player (born 1976)

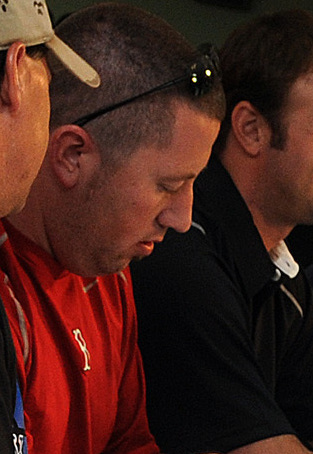
- Anderson at As Sayliyah Army Base in 2009
- Pitcher
- Born: January 22, 1976 (age 49); Portsmouth, Virginia, U.S.
- Batted: Left Threw: Left

MLB debut
- July 4, 1999, for the Pittsburgh Pirates

Last MLB appearance
- July 21, 2004, for the Boston Red Sox

MLB statistics
- Win–loss record: 25–47
- Earned run average: 5.42
- Strikeouts: 241
- Stats at Baseball Reference

Teams
- Pittsburgh Pirates (1999–2002); Cincinnati Reds (2003); Chicago Cubs (2004); Boston Red Sox (2004)

James Drew Anderson (born January 22, 1976) is an American former professional baseball pitcher who pitched for five seasons in Major League Baseball (MLB). Anderson made his MLB debut in 1999, appearing in 13 games for the Pirates. In 2000, Anderson pitched in 27 games (26 starts), compiling a record of 5–11 in 144 innings. In 2001, Anderson had career highs in wins (9), games started (34), innings pitched (206.1) and strikeouts (89). He finished 9–17 with a 5.10 ERA.

In 2002, Anderson regressed and lost control, walking 63 batters while striking out just 47 in 140 2/3 innings for the Pirates. He was let go after the season and signed with the Cincinnati Reds. He went 1–5 in 8 games for the Reds and was later designated for assignment. Instead of choosing an outright assignment to AAA, Anderson refused and became a free agent. Anderson later signed a minor league deal with the Giants, for which he started 8 games, going 1–4 with a 6.44 ERA.

In 2004, Anderson signed a minor league deal with the Chicago Cubs. Anderson pitched in 16 games at the AAA level before being called up by the Cubs. Anderson appeared in just 7 games for the Cubs, all relief appearances, and notched his first career save.

Anderson was traded to the Boston Red Sox for a minor league pitcher on July 2, 2004. Despite not being on the World Series roster, he was rewarded for his contributions with a championship ring.

In 2005, Anderson pitched in the Twins, Astros, Cubs and Devil Rays minor league systems. Between all four, Anderson compiled an 8–10 record in 27 games (25 starts). He had a 3.44 ERA despite a WHIP of 1.50 due to his walks (66) and hits (150) in 144 innings.

Anderson last played in the Florida Marlins organization in 2006. He was released after posting an ERA of 5.77 in 22 games. After his release, he retired from baseball.

As of 2013, he works with Bobby McKinney in Western Branch Batting and Pitching Clinic. He is also coaching a team called the Mid-Atlantic Pirates Scout team.
