= Kip Wells =

American baseball player (born 1977)

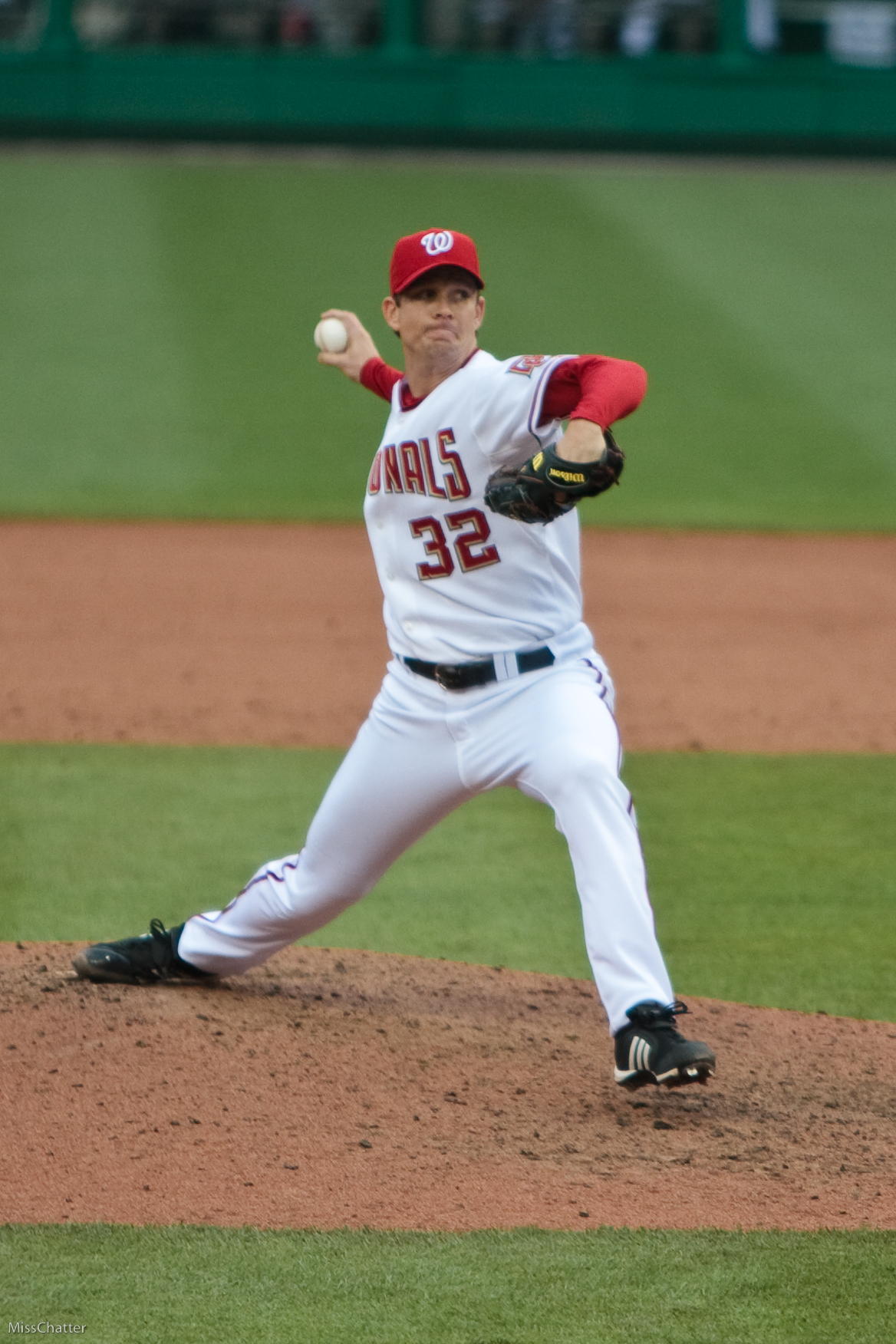
- Wells with the Washington Nationals in 2009
- Pitcher
- Born: April 21, 1977 (age 49); Houston, Texas, U.S.
- Batted: Right Threw: Right

MLB debut
- August 2, 1999, for the Chicago White Sox

Last MLB appearance
- August 1, 2012, for the San Diego Padres

MLB statistics
- Win–loss record: 69–103
- Earned run average: 4.71
- Strikeouts: 963
- Stats at Baseball Reference

Teams
- Chicago White Sox (1999–2001); Pittsburgh Pirates (2002–2006); Texas Rangers (2006); St. Louis Cardinals (2007); Colorado Rockies (2008); Kansas City Royals (2008); Washington Nationals (2009); Cincinnati Reds (2009); San Diego Padres (2012)

Robert "Kip" Wells (born April 21, 1977) is an American former professional baseball pitcher. In his Major League Baseball (MLB) career, he played for the Pittsburgh Pirates, Texas Rangers, St. Louis Cardinals, Colorado Rockies, Chicago White Sox, Kansas City Royals, Washington Nationals, Cincinnati Reds, and San Diego Padres between 1999 and 2012.

== Early life ==
Robert "Kip" Wells was born on April 21, 1977, in Houston, Texas. Wells attended Elkins High School in Missouri City, Texas, and played for the baseball team and was an honor roll student. In baseball, he won All-State and All-America honors after his Senior year (1995). He was drafted by the Milwaukee Brewers in the 58th round of the 1995 Major League Baseball draft, but did not sign with the Brewers.

== College career ==
Wells attended Baylor University. He posted a career win–loss record of 21-14 for the Baylor Bears with a 5.17 earned run average (ERA) and 288 strikeouts in three collegiate seasons and was 1998 2nd Team All-America, 1998 Big 12 1st Team, 1998 All-Region, 1999 Pre Season All America 2nd Team. He also played with the Brewster Whitecaps in the Cape Cod League during the summer of 1997, posting a 5–6 record with a 1.92 ERA, 49 strikeouts and five saves to earn the league's Outstanding Pro Prospect Award.

== Professional career ==
=== Draft and minor leagues ===
Wells was the first round (16th overall) draft pick of the Chicago White Sox in the 1998 Major League Baseball draft.

=== Chicago White Sox (1999–2001) ===
Wells made his first major league appearance with the White Sox the following year. In his debut against the Detroit Tigers, Wells went 5.1 innings, giving up 6 hits, 2 runs and 1 earned run while walking 2 and striking out 4 for his first Major League victory

=== Pittsburgh Pirates (2002–2006) ===
After the 2001 season, in which he split time between the starting rotation and the bullpen, Wells was traded to the Pittsburgh Pirates.

As of the end of the 2005 season, Wells had a 55–69 record and a 4.36 ERA after 188 games over the course of seven seasons. Wells led the league in losses in 2005, going 8–18 on a Pirates team that went 67–95.

On March 1, 2006, Wells announced he would have surgery to remove a blood clot in his right arm. The surgery was performed on March 6, and he returned to the field on June 19, 2006.

=== Texas Rangers (2006) ===
At the trade deadline in 2006, Wells was traded from the Pittsburgh Pirates to the Texas Rangers in exchange for Jesse Chavez.

=== St. Louis Cardinals (2007) ===
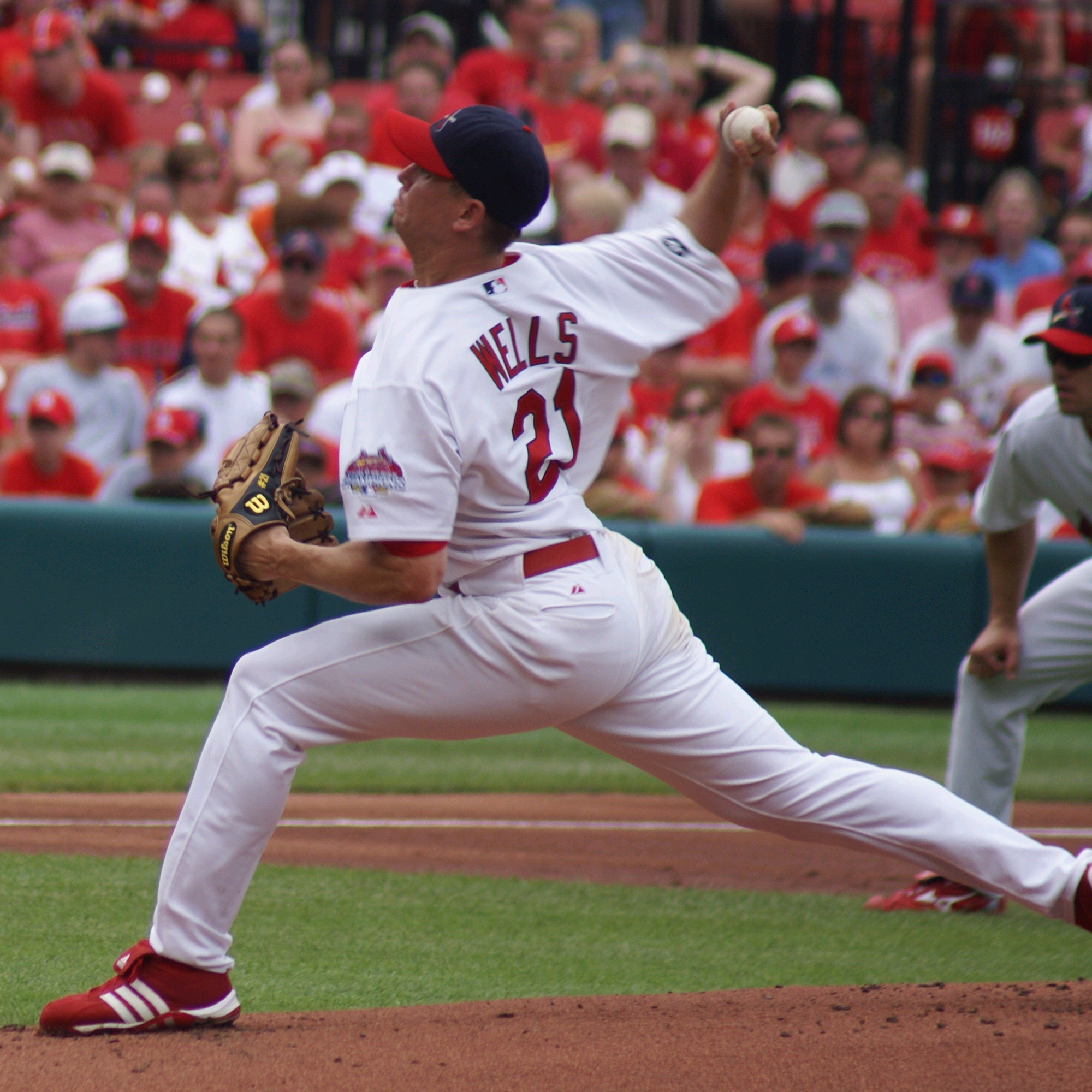
Wells with the Cardinals in 2007.

On November 28, 2006, Kip Wells signed a free agent contract with the St. Louis Cardinals. Kip Wells was said to be the Cardinals starting pitching rotation. He struggled in the first half, going 3–11 with an ERA of 5.92 and getting demoted to the bullpen right before the All-Star break. After the All-Star Break, he was a little better, posting a 4–6 record. He made a promising start against the Florida Marlins on July 18, when he threw eight shutout innings in a 6-0 Cardinals win. At the conclusion of the 2007 season, Wells' record was 7–17 with an ERA of 5.70.

=== Colorado Rockies (2008) ===
On December 13, 2007, Wells signed with the Colorado Rockies. Slated to be a long reliever for the team, he wound up making the start for the Rockies on Opening Day. Jeff Francis was supposed to get the start, but the Rockies' first game was rained out, and manager Clint Hurdle opted to start Wells to keep the rotation on normal rest. Wells began the 2008 season compiling a 2.29 ERA in ten games with 16 strikeouts as the primary long relief pitcher out of the bullpen. However, on April 30, Wells was placed on the disabled list with blood clots in his pitching hand. On August 10, 2008, the Rockies designated him for assignment and was eventually released.

=== Kansas City Royals (2008) ===
Wells signed with the Kansas City Royals on August 18, 2008.

=== Washington Nationals (2009) ===
On March 11, 2009, Wells signed a minor league contract with the Washington Nationals. He was brought up to the majors to pitch out of the bullpen, but was ineffective, posting a 6.49 ERA in 26 1/3 innings before being placed on the disabled list with a right adductor strain on June 2. Wells was again designated for assignment on June 24.

=== Cincinnati Reds (2009) ===
On July 9, 2009, Wells signed a minor league contract with the Cincinnati Reds, and was assigned to their Triple-A affiliate, the Louisville Bats. In August, Wells was recalled to Cincinnati's major league roster. The Reds used Wells in the role of a long reliever as well as a fill-in starter.

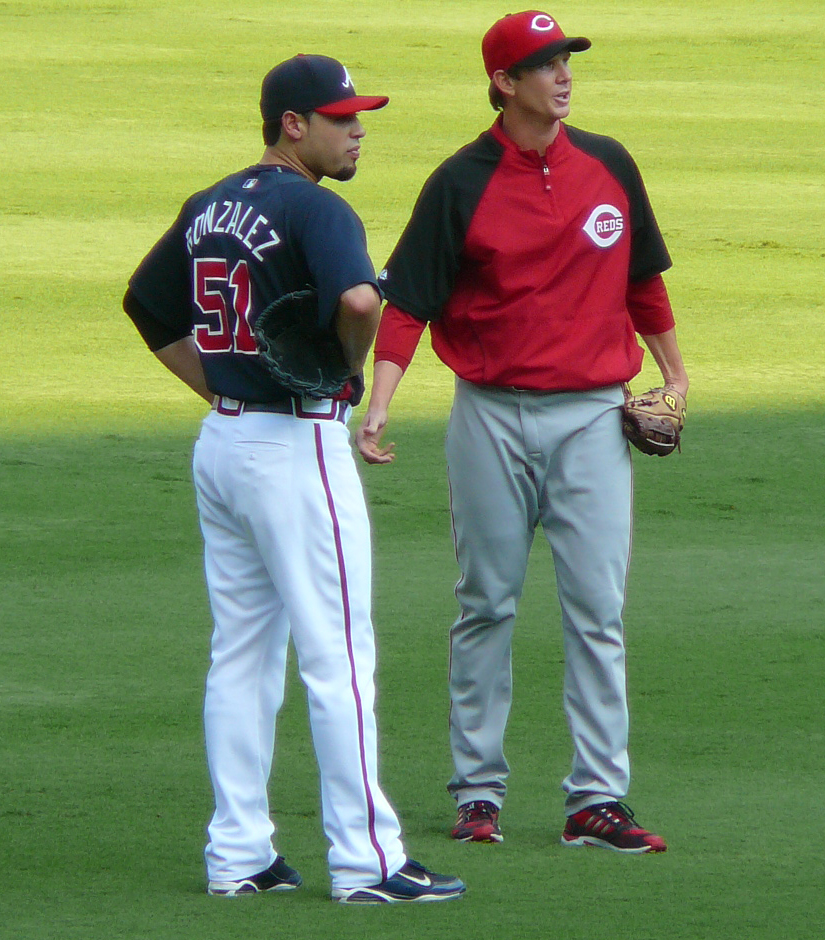
Wells (right) with former Pirates teammate Mike Gonzalez in 2009.

On February 13, 2010, the Cincinnati Reds re-signed Wells to a minor league contract that included an invitation to spring training. He was released by the Reds organization on April 2.

=== Long Island Ducks ===
On July 14, 2010, Wells signed with the Long Island Ducks of the Atlantic League of Professional Baseball. In 5 starts for the team, he posted a 2–2 record and 4.00 ERA with 23 strikeouts across 27 innings pitched.

On March 24, 2011, Wells signed a minor league contract with the Arizona Diamondbacks. However, he never appeared in a game for the organization.

Wells hired Burton Rocks as his agent and on April 6, 2012, Wells agreed to a minor league contract with the Chicago White Sox, but subsequently agreed to a mutual release on April 16.

=== San Diego Padres (2012) ===
On May 8, 2012, Wells agreed to a minor league contract with the San Diego Padres. Wells had his contract purchased by the Padres on June 25. The next day, Wells started his first major league game since 2009 against the Houston Astros. On August 3, the Padres designated Wells for assignment. Wells accepted an outright assignment to the Triple-A Tucson Padres after clearing waivers. Wells posted a 2–4 record and a 4.58 ERA with 19 strikeouts in 7 starts for the Padres. The highlight of his time with the Padres was his seven shutout innings in a start in Coors Field, but his 0.95 strikeout-to-walk ratio and 1.4 home runs per nine innings hurt his overall results.

=== Los Angeles Angels of Anaheim ===
On April 13, 2013, Wells agreed to a minor league contract with the Los Angeles Angels of Anaheim. Wells was released after six starts for the Triple-A Salt Lake Bees.

On November 10, 2013, Wells announced his retirement from professional baseball at the age of 36.

== Coaching career ==
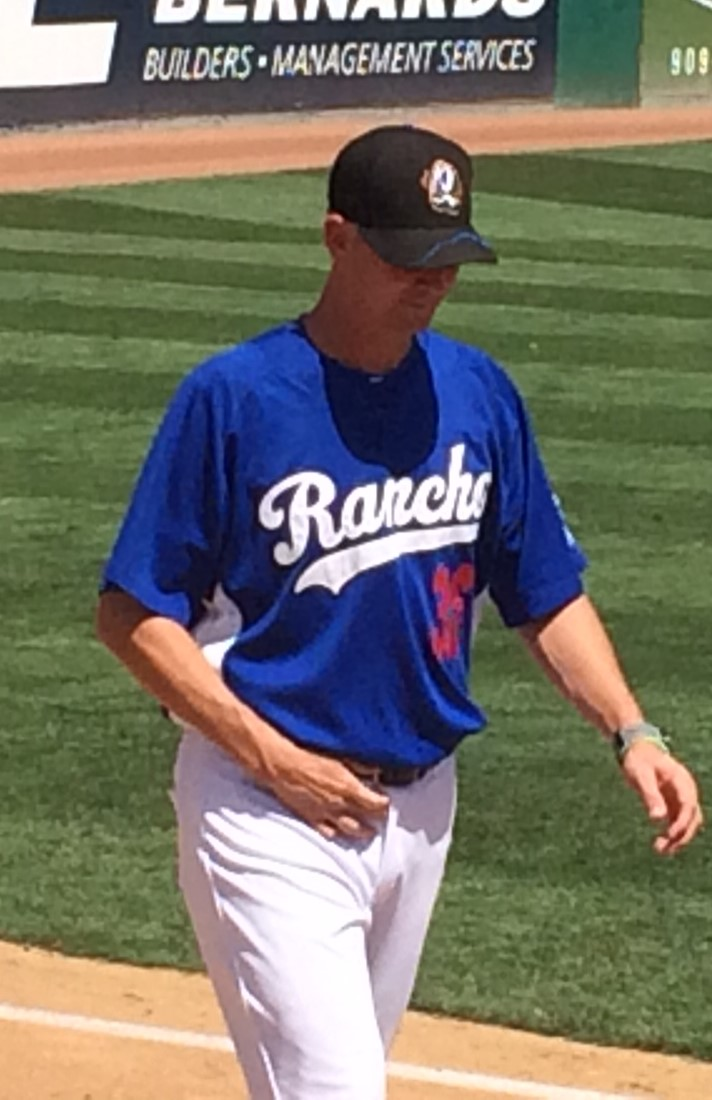
Kip Wells as pitching coach for the Rancho Cucamonga Quakes

In 2016, Wells was named the pitching coach for the Rancho Cucamonga Quakes, the Los Angeles Dodgers' Single-A affiliate in the California League. He left his position with the Dodgers organization after the 2017 season.
