= 2002 Major League Baseball season =

2002 MLB season
- League: Major League Baseball
- Sport: Baseball
- Duration: March 31 – October 27, 2002
- Games: 162
- Teams: 30
- TV partner(s): Fox; ESPN/ABC Family

Draft
- Top draft pick: Bryan Bullington
- Picked by: Pittsburgh Pirates

Regular Season
- Season MVP: AL: Miguel Tejada (OAK); NL: Barry Bonds (SF)

Postseason
- AL champions: Anaheim Angels
- AL runners-up: Minnesota Twins
- NL champions: San Francisco Giants
- NL runners-up: St. Louis Cardinals

World Series
- Champions: Anaheim Angels
- Runners-up: San Francisco Giants
- World Series MVP: Troy Glaus (ANA)

MLB seasons
- ← 2001 2003 →

Locations of AL teams for the 2000–2004 MLB seasons
West Central East
Locations of NL teams for the 2001–2002 NL seasons
West Central East

The 2002 Major League Baseball season finished with two wild-card teams contesting the World Series; the Anaheim Angels defeated the San Francisco Giants in seven games for the World Series championship. It was the first title in Angels team history. This was the first season for MLB.tv.

== Standings ==
=== American League ===
AL East
Team	W	L	Pct.	GB	Home	Road
^{(1)} New York Yankees	103	58	.640	—	52‍–‍28	51‍–‍30
Boston Red Sox	93	69	.574	10½	42‍–‍39	51‍–‍30
Toronto Blue Jays	78	84	.481	25½	42‍–‍39	36‍–‍45
Baltimore Orioles	67	95	.414	36½	34‍–‍47	33‍–‍48
Tampa Bay Devil Rays	55	106	.342	48	30‍–‍51	25‍–‍55

AL Central
Team	W	L	Pct.	GB	Home	Road
^{(3)} Minnesota Twins	94	67	.584	—	54‍–‍27	40‍–‍40
Chicago White Sox	81	81	.500	13½	47‍–‍34	34‍–‍47
Cleveland Indians	74	88	.457	20½	39‍–‍42	35‍–‍46
Kansas City Royals	62	100	.383	32½	37‍–‍44	25‍–‍56
Detroit Tigers	55	106	.342	39	33‍–‍47	22‍–‍59

AL West
Team	W	L	Pct.	GB	Home	Road
^{(2)} Oakland Athletics	103	59	.636	—	54‍–‍27	49‍–‍32
^{(4)} Anaheim Angels	99	63	.611	4	54‍–‍27	45‍–‍36
Seattle Mariners	93	69	.574	10	48‍–‍33	45‍–‍36
Texas Rangers	72	90	.444	31	42‍–‍39	30‍–‍51

=== National League ===
NL East
Team	W	L	Pct.	GB	Home	Road
^{(1)} Atlanta Braves	101	59	.631	—	52‍–‍28	49‍–‍31
Montreal Expos	83	79	.512	19	49‍–‍32	34‍–‍47
Philadelphia Phillies	80	81	.497	21½	40‍–‍40	40‍–‍41
Florida Marlins	79	83	.488	23	46‍–‍35	33‍–‍48
New York Mets	75	86	.466	26½	38‍–‍43	37‍–‍43

NL Central
Team	W	L	Pct.	GB	Home	Road
^{(3)} St. Louis Cardinals	97	65	.599	—	52‍–‍29	45‍–‍36
Houston Astros	84	78	.519	13	47‍–‍34	37‍–‍44
Cincinnati Reds	78	84	.481	19	38‍–‍43	40‍–‍41
Pittsburgh Pirates	72	89	.447	24½	38‍–‍42	34‍–‍47
Chicago Cubs	67	95	.414	30	36‍–‍45	31‍–‍50
Milwaukee Brewers	56	106	.346	41	31‍–‍50	25‍–‍56

NL West
Team	W	L	Pct.	GB	Home	Road
^{(2)} Arizona Diamondbacks	98	64	.605	—	55‍–‍26	43‍–‍38
^{(4)} San Francisco Giants	95	66	.590	2½	50‍–‍31	45‍–‍35
Los Angeles Dodgers	92	70	.568	6	46‍–‍35	46‍–‍35
Colorado Rockies	73	89	.451	25	47‍–‍34	26‍–‍55
San Diego Padres	66	96	.407	32	41‍–‍40	25‍–‍56

== Postseason ==
=== Bracket ===
Division Series (ALDS, NLDS)
1	NY Yankees	1
4	Anaheim	3
American League
2	Oakland	2
3	Minnesota	3
1	Atlanta	2
4	San Francisco	3
National League
2	Arizona	0
3	St. Louis	3

League Championship Series (NLCS, ALCS)
4	Anaheim	4
3	Minnesota	1
4	San Francisco	4
3	St. Louis	1

World Series
AL4	Anaheim	4
NL4	San Francisco	3

== Statistical leaders ==
=== Batting ===
==== Team ====
Statistic	American League		National League	
Runs scored	New York Yankees	897	Arizona Diamondbacks	819
Hits	Anaheim Angels	1603	Colorado Rockies	1508
Home runs	Texas Rangers	230	Chicago Cubs	200
Batting average	Anaheim Angels	.282	Colorado Rockies	.274
Stolen bases	Kansas City Royals	140	Florida Marlins	177

==== Individual ====
Statistic	American League		National League	
Batting average	Manny Ramírez (Boston)	.349	Barry Bonds (San Francisco)	.370
Runs scored	Alfonso Soriano (New York Yankees)	128	Sammy Sosa (Chicago Cubs)	122
Hits	Alfonso Soriano (New York Yankees)	209	Vladimir Guerrero (Montreal)	206
Home runs	Alex Rodriguez (Texas)	57	Sammy Sosa (Chicago Cubs)	49
Runs batted in	Alex Rodriguez (Texas)	142	Lance Berkman (Houston)	128
Stolen bases	Alfonso Soriano (New York Yankees)	41	Luis Castillo (Florida)	48

=== Pitching ===
==== Team ====
Statistic	American League		National League	
Runs allowed	Anaheim Angels	644	Atlanta Braves	565
Earned run average	Oakland Athletics	3.68	Atlanta Braves	3.13
Hits allowed	Boston Red Sox	1339	Atlanta Braves	1302
Home runs allowed	Oakland Athletics	135	San Francisco Giants	116
Strikeouts	Boston Red Sox	1157	Chicago Cubs	1333

==== Individual ====
Statistic	American League		National League	
Earned run average	Pedro Martínez (Boston)	2.26	Randy Johnson (Arizona)	2.32
Wins	Barry Zito (Oakland)	23	Randy Johnson (Arizona)	24
Saves	Eddie Guardado (Minnesota)	45	John Smoltz (Atlanta)	55
Strikeouts	Pedro Martínez (Boston)	239	Randy Johnson (Arizona)	334

== Managers ==
=== American League ===
Team	Manager	Comments
Anaheim Angels	Mike Scioscia	Won the World Series
Baltimore Orioles	Mike Hargrove	
Boston Red Sox	Grady Little	
Chicago White Sox	Jerry Manuel	
Cleveland Indians	Charlie Manuel	Replaced during the season by Joel Skinner
Detroit Tigers	Phil Garner	Replaced during the season by Luis Pujols
Kansas City Royals	Tony Muser	John Mizerock served as interim manager for 13 games prior to being replaced by Tony Peña
Minnesota Twins	Ron Gardenhire	
New York Yankees	Joe Torre	
Oakland Athletics	Art Howe	20-game win streak from August 13 to September 4
Seattle Mariners	Lou Piniella	
Tampa Bay Devil Rays	Hal McRae	
Texas Rangers	Jerry Narron	
Toronto Blue Jays	Buck Martinez	Replaced during the season by Carlos Tosca

=== National League ===
Team	Manager	Comments
Arizona Diamondbacks	Bob Brenly	
Atlanta Braves	Bobby Cox	
Chicago Cubs	Don Baylor	Replaced during the season by Bruce Kimm
Cincinnati Reds	Bob Boone	
Colorado Rockies	Buddy Bell	Replaced during the season by Clint Hurdle
Florida Marlins	Jeff Torborg	
Houston Astros	Jimy Williams	
Los Angeles Dodgers	Jim Tracy	
Milwaukee Brewers±	Davey Lopes	Replaced during the season by Jerry Royster
Montreal Expos	Frank Robinson	
New York Mets	Bobby Valentine	
Philadelphia Phillies	Larry Bowa	
Pittsburgh Pirates	Lloyd McClendon	
St. Louis Cardinals	Tony LaRussa	
San Diego Padres	Bruce Bochy	
San Francisco Giants	Dusty Baker	Won the National League pennant

±hosted the MLB All Star Game

== Milestones ==
=== Batters ===
- Barry Bonds (SF):
  - Became the fourth player in Major League history to hit 600 home runs in the sixth inning against the Pittsburgh Pirates on August 9.

== Awards ==
Baseball Writers' Association of America Awards
BBWAA Award	National League	American League
Rookie of the Year	Jason Jennings (COL)	Eric Hinske (TOR)
Cy Young Award	Randy Johnson (AZ)	Barry Zito (OAK)
Manager of the Year	Tony La Russa (STL)	Mike Scioscia (ANA)
Most Valuable Player	Barry Bonds (SF)	Miguel Tejada (OAK)
Gold Glove Awards
Position	National League	American League
Pitcher	Greg Maddux (ATL)	Kenny Rogers (TEX)
Catcher	Brad Ausmus (HOU)	Bengie Molina (ANA)
1st Base	Todd Helton (COL)	John Olerud (SEA)
2nd Base	Fernando Viña (STL)	Bret Boone (SEA)
3rd Base	Scott Rolen (STL)/(PHI)	Eric Chavez (OAK)
Shortstop	Édgar Rentería (STL)	Alex Rodriguez (TEX)
Outfield	Jim Edmonds (STL); Andruw Jones (ATL); Larry Walker (COL)	Darin Erstad (ANA); Torii Hunter (MIN); Ichiro Suzuki (SEA)
Silver Slugger Awards
Position	National League	American League
Pitcher/Designated Hitter	Mike Hampton (ATL)	Manny Ramirez (BOS)
Catcher	Mike Piazza (NYM)	Jorge Posada (NYY)
1st Base	Todd Helton (COL)	Jason Giambi (NYY)
2nd Base	Jeff Kent (SF)	Alfonso Soriano (NYY)
3rd Base	Scott Rolen (STL)/(PHI)	Eric Chavez (OAK)
Shortstop	Édgar Rentería (STL)	Alex Rodriguez (TEX)
Outfield	Barry Bonds (SF); Vladimir Guerrero (MON); Sammy Sosa (CHC)	Garret Anderson (ANA); Magglio Ordóñez (CWS); Bernie Williams (NYY)

=== Other awards ===
- Outstanding Designated Hitter Award: Ellis Burks (CLE)
- Hank Aaron Award: Alex Rodriguez (TEX), American); Barry Bonds (SF), National).
- Roberto Clemente Award (Humanitarian): Jim Thome (CLE).
- Rolaids Relief Man Award: Billy Koch (OAK, American); John Smoltz (ATL, National).
- Warren Spahn Award (Best left-handed pitcher): Randy Johnson (AZ)

=== Player of the Month ===
Month	American League	National League
April	Torii Hunter	Vladimir Guerrero
May	Jason Giambi	Todd Helton
June	Paul Konerko	Jeff Kent
July	Alex Rodriguez	Larry Walker
August	Alex Rodriguez	Barry Bonds
September	Manny Ramirez	Brian Jordan

=== Pitcher of the Month ===
Month	American League	National League
April	Derek Lowe	Randy Johnson
May	Bartolo Colón	Curt Schilling
June	Mark Mulder	Éric Gagné
July	Pedro Martínez	Curt Schilling
August	Cory Lidle	Roy Oswalt
September	Andy Pettitte	Randy Johnson

=== Rookie of the Month ===
Month	American League	National League
April	Carlos Peña	Kaz Ishii
May	Ryan Drese	Austin Kearns
June	Eric Hinske	Jason Simontacchi
July	Rodrigo López	Kirk Saarloos
August	Josh Phelps	Jason Jennings
September	Josh Phelps	Endy Chávez

== Home field attendance and payroll ==
Team name	Wins	%±	Home attendance	%±	Per game	Est. payroll	%±
Seattle Mariners	93	−19.8%	3,542,938	1.0%	43,740	$80,282,668	7.4%
New York Yankees	103	8.4%	3,465,807	6.2%	43,323	$125,928,583	11.7%
San Francisco Giants	95	5.6%	3,253,203	−1.8%	40,163	$78,299,835	23.7%
Arizona Diamondbacks	98	6.5%	3,198,977	16.9%	39,494	$102,819,999	20.8%
Los Angeles Dodgers	92	7.0%	3,131,255	3.8%	38,657	$94,850,953	−13.1%
St. Louis Cardinals	97	4.3%	3,011,756	−3.1%	37,182	$74,660,875	−5.9%
New York Mets	75	−8.5%	2,804,838	5.5%	34,628	$94,633,593	1.6%
Colorado Rockies	73	0.0%	2,737,838	−13.5%	33,800	$56,851,043	−20.5%
Chicago Cubs	67	−23.9%	2,693,096	−3.1%	33,248	$75,690,833	17.0%
Baltimore Orioles	67	6.3%	2,682,439	−13.3%	33,117	$64,493,487	−13.2%
Boston Red Sox	93	13.4%	2,650,862	1.0%	32,727	$108,366,060	−1.5%
Cleveland Indians	74	−18.7%	2,616,940	−17.6%	32,308	$78,909,449	−15.5%
Atlanta Braves	101	14.8%	2,603,484	−7.8%	32,142	$93,470,367	1.7%
Houston Astros	84	−9.7%	2,517,357	−13.3%	31,078	$63,448,417	4.7%
Texas Rangers	72	−1.4%	2,352,397	−16.9%	29,042	$105,726,122	19.3%
Anaheim Angels	99	32.0%	2,305,547	15.2%	28,464	$61,721,667	29.3%
San Diego Padres	66	−16.5%	2,220,601	−6.6%	27,415	$41,425,000	5.7%
Oakland Athletics	103	1.0%	2,169,811	1.7%	26,788	$40,004,167	18.3%
Milwaukee Brewers	56	−17.6%	1,969,153	−29.9%	24,311	$50,287,833	14.6%
Minnesota Twins	94	10.6%	1,924,473	7.9%	23,759	$40,425,000	67.5%
Cincinnati Reds	78	18.2%	1,855,787	−1.3%	22,911	$45,050,390	−8.0%
Pittsburgh Pirates	72	16.1%	1,784,988	−27.6%	22,312	$42,323,599	−26.7%
Chicago White Sox	81	−2.4%	1,676,911	−5.1%	20,703	$57,052,833	−13.1%
Toronto Blue Jays	78	−2.5%	1,637,900	−14.5%	20,221	$76,864,333	0.0%
Philadelphia Phillies	80	−7.0%	1,618,467	−9.2%	20,231	$57,954,999	39.1%
Detroit Tigers	55	−16.7%	1,503,623	−21.7%	18,795	$55,048,000	3.1%
Kansas City Royals	62	−4.6%	1,323,036	−13.9%	16,334	$47,257,000	33.4%
Tampa Bay Devil Rays	55	−11.3%	1,065,742	−17.9%	13,157	$34,380,000	−39.7%
Florida Marlins	79	3.9%	813,118	−35.5%	10,038	$41,979,917	17.4%
Montreal Expos	83	22.1%	812,045	26.3%	10,025	$38,670,500	10.0%

== Television coverage ==
This was the second season that national television coverage was split between ESPN and Fox Sports. ESPN and ESPN2 aired selected weeknight and Sunday night games, and selected Division Series playoff games. Fox televised Saturday baseball, the All-Star Game, selected Division Series games, both League Championship Series, and the World Series.

The Thursday night national broadcast that had moved from Fox Sports Net to Fox Family for 2000 was discontinued after Disney purchased Fox Family and rebranded it as ABC Family. As part of the deal, ABC Family's now-corporate sibling ESPN was given the broadcast rights that had previously belonged to Fox Family and FX; the postseason games that Fox Family had been airing continued to air on ABC Family for the 2002 season, after which they were moved to ESPN for the remainder of the contract.

== See also ==
- 2002 Nippon Professional Baseball season
