= 2002 New York Mets season =

2002 New York Mets
- League: National League
- Division: East
- Ballpark: Shea Stadium
- City: New York
- Record: 75–86 (.466)
- Divisional place: 5th
- Owners: Nelson Doubleday Jr. (50% before August 14), Fred Wilpon (50% before August 14, 100% after buying out Doubleday)
- General manager: Steve Phillips
- Manager: Bobby Valentine
- Television: WPIX (Tom Seaver, Gary Thorne); Fox Sports New York/MSG (Ralph Kiner, Fran Healy, Howie Rose, Gary Thorne)
- Radio: WFAN (Bob Murphy, Gary Cohen, Ed Coleman, Ted Robinson); WADO (spanish) (Juan Alicea, Billy Berroa)

The 2002 New York Mets season was the 41st regular season for the Mets. Hoping to improve on their third place finish in the National League East the previous year, a 6–21 August sunk the team into below .500 for good and ultimately they finished 75–86 and finished fifth in the National League East. They were managed by Bobby Valentine in his seventh and ultimately final season. They played home games at Shea Stadium.

== Offseason ==
- October 22, 2001: Jorge Velandia was signed as a free agent with the New York Mets.
- December 7, 2001: David Justice was traded by the New York Yankees to the New York Mets for Robin Ventura.
- December 11, 2001: Roberto Alomar was traded by the Cleveland Indians with Danny Peoples (minors) and Mike Bacsik to the New York Mets for players to be named later, Matt Lawton, Alex Escobar, and Jerrod Riggan. The New York Mets sent Earl Snyder (December 13, 2001) and Billy Traber (December 13, 2001) to the Cleveland Indians to complete the trade.
- December 13, 2001: Dave Weathers was signed as a free agent with the New York Mets.
- December 14, 2001: David Justice was traded by the New York Mets to the Oakland Athletics for Mark Guthrie and Tyler Yates.
- December 16, 2001: Tsuyoshi Shinjo was traded by the New York Mets with Desi Relaford to the San Francisco Giants for Shawn Estes.
- January 21, 2002: Alex Ochoa was traded as part of a 3-team trade by the Colorado Rockies to the Milwaukee Brewers. The New York Mets sent Lenny Harris and Glendon Rusch to the Milwaukee Brewers. The New York Mets sent Benny Agbayani, Todd Zeile, and cash to the Colorado Rockies. The Colorado Rockies sent Craig House and Ross Gload to the New York Mets. The Milwaukee Brewers sent Jeff D'Amico, Jeromy Burnitz, Lou Collier, Mark Sweeney, and cash to the New York Mets.
- March 13, 2002: Mark Sweeney was released by the New York Mets.
- March 24, 2002: Jason Bay was traded by the Montreal Expos with Jimmy Serrano to the New York Mets for Lou Collier.

== Regular season ==
=== Opening Day starters ===
- Edgardo Alfonzo
- Roberto Alomar
- Jeromy Burnitz
- Roger Cedeño
- Al Leiter
- Rey Ordóñez
- Jay Payton
- Mike Piazza
- Mo Vaughn

=== Season standings ===
==== National League East ====
NL East
Team	W	L	Pct.	GB	Home	Road
Atlanta Braves	101	59	.631	—	52‍–‍28	49‍–‍31
Montreal Expos	83	79	.512	19	49‍–‍32	34‍–‍47
Philadelphia Phillies	80	81	.497	21½	40‍–‍40	40‍–‍41
Florida Marlins	79	83	.488	23	46‍–‍35	33‍–‍48
New York Mets	75	86	.466	26½	38‍–‍43	37‍–‍43

==== Record vs. opponents ====
2002 National League record Source: MLB Standings Grid – 2002
Team	AZ	ATL	CHC	CIN	COL	FLA	HOU	LAD	MIL	MON	NYM	PHI	PIT	SD	SF	STL	AL
Arizona	—	3–3	4–2	6–0	14–5	5–1	3–3	9–10	4–2	4–2	5–2	4–3	4–2	12–7	8–11	2–4	11–7
Atlanta	3–3	—	4–2	4–2	4–3	11–8	3–3	2–4	5–1	13–6	12–7	11–7	3–3	3–3	3–3–1	5–1	15–3
Chicago	2–4	2–4	—	5–12	4–2	4–2	8–11	2–4	7–10	3–3	1–5	2–4	10–9	2–4	3–3	6–12	6–6
Cincinnati	0–6	2–4	12–5	—	3–3	5–1	6–11	4–2	13–6	1–5	2–4	2–4	11–7	5–1	2–4	8–11	2–10
Colorado	5–14	3–4	2–4	3–3	—	5–2	3–3	7–12	3–3	4–2	3–3	3–3	4–2	11–8	8–12	2–4	7–11
Florida	1–5	8–11	2–4	1–5	2–5	—	3–3	3–3	4–2	10–9	8–11	10–9	4–2	5–1	4–3	4–2	10–8
Houston	3–3	3–3	11–8	11–6	3–3	3–3	—	3–3	10–8	3–3	4–2	3–3	11–6	4–2	1–5	6–13	5–7
Los Angeles	10–9	4–2	4–2	2–4	12–7	3–3	3–3	—	5–1	5–2	4–2	4–3	4–2	10–9	8–11	2–4	12–6
Milwaukee	2–4	1–5	10–7	6–13	3–3	2–4	8–10	1–5	—	2–4	1–5	1–5	4–15	5–1	1–5	7–10	2–10
Montreal	2–4	6–13	3–3	5–1	2–4	9–10	3–3	2–5	4–2	—	11–8	11–8	3–3	3–4	4–2	3–3	12–6
New York	2–5	7–12	5–1	4–2	3–3	11–8	2–4	2–4	5–1	8–11	—	9–10	1–4	3–4	0–6	3–3	10–8
Philadelphia	3–4	7–11	4–2	4–2	3–3	9–10	3–3	3–4	5–1	8–11	10–9	—	2–4	2–4	3–3	4–2	10–8
Pittsburgh	2–4	3–3	9–10	7–11	2–4	2–4	6–11	2–4	15–4	3–3	4–1	4–2	—	2–4	2–4	6–11	3–9
San Diego	7–12	3–3	4–2	1–5	8–11	1–5	2–4	9–10	1–5	4–3	4–3	4–2	4–2	—	5–14	1–5	8–10
San Francisco	11–8	3–3–1	3–3	4–2	11–8	3–4	5–1	11–8	5–1	2–4	6–0	3–3	4–2	14–5	—	2–4	8–10
St. Louis	4–2	1–5	12–6	11–8	4–2	2–4	13–6	4–2	10–7	3–3	3–3	2–4	11–6	5–1	4–2	—	8–4

=== Notable transactions ===
- April 5, 2002: Marco Scutaro was selected off waivers by the New York Mets from the Milwaukee Brewers.
- June 4, 2002: Scott Kazmir was drafted by the New York Mets in the 1st round (15th pick) of the 2002 amateur draft. Player signed August 2, 2002.
- July 31, 2002: Jason Bay was traded by the New York Mets with Josh Reynolds (minors) and Bobby Jones to the San Diego Padres for Steve Reed and Jason Middlebrook.

=== Game log ===
Legend
Mets Win	Mets Loss	Game Postponed
Bold = Mets team member

2002 Game Log
Overall: 75–86 (Home: 38–43; Away: 37–43)
April: (16–10) Home: 10–5; Away: 6–5

#	Date	Opponent	Score	Win	Loss	Save	Location	Attendance	Record
1	April 1	Pirates	6–2	**Leiter** (1–0)	Villone (0–1)	—	**Shea Stadium**	53,734	1–0
2	April 3	Pirates	3–5	Wells (1–0)	**Trachsel** (0–1)	Williams (1)	**Shea Stadium**	25,952	1–1
3	April 4	Pirates	2–3	Anderson (1–0)	**Estes** (0–1)	Williams (2)	**Shea Stadium**	33,785	1–2
4	April 5	@ Braves	9–3	**Astacio** (1–0)	Lopez (0–1)	—	Turner Field	35,347	2–2
5	April 6	@ Braves	11–2	**Weathers** (1–0)	Smoltz (0–1)	—	Turner Field	41,124	3–2
6	April 7	@ Braves	2–5 (14)	Lopez (1–1)	**Komiyama** (0–1)	—	Turner Field	34,210	3–3
7	April 9	@ Cubs	0–2	Lieber (1–0)	**Trachsel** (0–2)	Alfonseca (1)	Wrigley Field	18,151	3–4
8	April 10	@ Cubs	3–2	**Weathers** (2–0)	Fassero (0–2)	**Benitez** (1)	Wrigley Field	22,471	4–4
9	April 11	@ Cubs	3–2	**Astacio** (2–0)	Cruz (0–2)	**Benitez** (2)	Wrigley Field	29,496	5–4
10	April 12	Expos	2–1	**D'Amico** (1–0)	Ohka (1–1)	**Benitez** (3)	**Shea Stadium**	32,624	6–4
11	April 13	Expos	8–9 (11)	Herges (2–0)	**Strickland** (0–1)	—	**Shea Stadium**	46,991	6–5
12	April 14	Expos	6–4	**Trachsel** (1–2)	Armas (1–2)	**Benitez** (4)	**Shea Stadium**	45,646	7–5
13	April 15	Braves	7–6 (12)	**Strickland** (1–1)	Hammond (0–1)	—	**Shea Stadium**	28,843	8–5
14	April 16	Braves	3–1	**Astacio** (3–0)	Glavine (2–1)	—	**Shea Stadium**	31,472	9–5
15	April 17	Braves	1–2	Millwood (2–1)	**D'Amico** (1–1)	Smoltz (3)	**Shea Stadium**	30,702	9–6
16	April 18	@ Expos	1–0	**Leiter** (2–0)	Vazquez (0–1)	—	Olympic Stadium	4,512	10–6
17	April 19	@ Expos	3–5	Armas (2–2)	**Trachsel** (1–3)	Herges (1)	Olympic Stadium	8,281	10–7
18	April 20	@ Expos	5–7	Pavano (2–2)	**Estes** (0–2)	Herges (2)	Olympic Stadium	11,464	10–8
19	April 21	@ Expos	3–6	Chen (2–0)	**Astacio** (3–1)	Lloyd (3)	Olympic Stadium	11,672	10–9
20	April 23	Cardinals	4–3	**D'Amico** (2–1)	Morris (4–1)	**Benitez** (5)	**Shea Stadium**	33,333	11–9
21	April 24	Cardinals	2–4	Kile (1–0)	**Leiter** (2–1)	Isringhausen (3)	**Shea Stadium**	22,938	11–10
22	April 25	Cardinals	7–6	**Strickland** (2–1)	Veres (2–2)	**Benitez** (6)	**Shea Stadium**	24,637	12–10
23	April 26	Brewers	1–0	**Estes** (1–2)	Rusch (1–2)	—	**Shea Stadium**	37,957	13–10
24	April 27	Brewers	2–1	**Astacio** (4–1)	Neugebauer (1–3)	**Benitez** (7)	**Shea Stadium**	35,105	14–10
25	April 28	Brewers	9–6	**Davis** (1–0)	King (0–1)	—	**Shea Stadium**	43,169	15–10
26	April 30	@ Diamondbacks	10–1	**Leiter** (3–1)	Helling (3–3)	—	Bank One Ballpark	36,743	16–10

May: (13–15) Home: 4–8; Away: 9–7

#	Date	Opponent	Score	Win	Loss	Save	Location	Attendance	Record
27	May 1	@ Diamondbacks	7–1	**Trachsel** (2–3)	Stottlemyre (0–2)	—	Bank One Ballpark	34,210	17–10
28	May 2	@ Diamondbacks	3–7	Batista (2–1)	**Estes** (1–3)	Kim (6)	Bank One Ballpark	31,466	17–11
29	May 3	@ Astros	11–3	**Astacio** (5–1)	Mlicki (3–3)	—	Astros Field	31,329	18–11
30	May 4	@ Astros	1–3	Hernandez (3–0)	**D'Amico** (2–2)	Wagner (4)	Astros Field	34,807	18–12
31	May 5	@ Astros	1–12	Oswalt (4–1)	**Leiter** (3–2)	—	Astros Field	36,083	18–13
32	May 7	Giants	1–5	Ortiz (3–1)	**Trachsel** (2–4)	—	**Shea Stadium**	40,016	18–14
33	May 8	Giants	2–8	Rueter (5–1)	**Estes** (1–4)	—	**Shea Stadium**	29,267	18–15
34	May 9	Giants	3–4	Jensen (3–2)	**Astacio** (5–2)	Nen (10)	**Shea Stadium**	28,757	18–16
35	May 10	Rockies	5–9	Jennings (3–2)	**D'Amico** (2–3)	—	**Shea Stadium**	37,484	18–17
36	May 11	Rockies	4–3	**Leiter** (4–2)	Hampton (1–5)	**Strickland** (1)	**Shea Stadium**	41,605	19–17
37	May 12	Rockies	3–4 (13)	White (1–4)	**Davis** (1–1)	Jimenez (9)	**Shea Stadium**	33,578	19–18
38	May 13	@ Dodgers	2–3 (13)	Carrara (3–1)	**Corey** (0–1)	—	Dodger Stadium	27,659	19–19
39	May 14	@ Dodgers	3–0	**Astacio** (6–2)	Ashby (2–4)	—	Dodger Stadium	28,610	20–19
40	May 15	@ Dodgers	2–0	**D'Amico** (3–3)	Ishii (6–1)	—	Dodger Stadium	31,995	21–19
41	May 16	@ Padres	3–1	**Leiter** (5–2)	Lawrence (4–3)	**Guthrie** (1)	Qualcomm Stadium	15,931	22–19
42	May 17	@ Padres	13–4	**Trachsel** (3–4)	Middlebrook (0–1)	—	Qualcomm Stadium	28,162	23–19
43	May 18	@ Padres	5–2	**Estes** (2–4)	Tomko (3–3)	**Benitez** (8)	Qualcomm Stadium	43,282	24–19
44	May 19	@ Padres	3–4	Reed (1–1)	**Strickland** (2–2)	—	Qualcomm Stadium	26,254	24–20
45	May 21	@ Phillies	0–4	Padilla (6–3)	**D'Amico** (3–4)	—	Veterans Stadium	21,090	24–21
46	May 22	@ Phillies	2–5	Adams (2–3)	**Leiter** (5–3)	Mesa (14)	Veterans Stadium	22,640	24–22
47	May 23	@ Phillies	1–0	**Strickland** (3–2)	Mesa (1–4)	**Benitez** (9)	Veterans Stadium	26,405	25–22
48	May 24	Marlins	5–4 (10)	**Strickland** (4–2)	Darensbourg (1–1)	—	**Shea Stadium**	37,699	26–22
49	May 25	Marlins	5–6	Almanza (1–0)	**Weathers** (2–1)	Nunez (11)	**Shea Stadium**	35,724	26–23
50	May 26	Marlins	3–0	**D'Amico** (4–4)	Burnett (5–5)	**Strickland** (2)	**Shea Stadium**	38,781	27–23
51	May 27	Marlins	3–5	Dempster (3–5)	**Leiter** (5–4)	Nunez (12)	**Shea Stadium**	24,319	27–24
52	May 28	Phillies	3–5	Cormier (2–4)	**Trachsel** (3–5)	Mesa (15)	**Shea Stadium**	25,939	27–25
53	May 29	Phillies	4–3	**Strickland** (5–2)	Santiago (1–3)	**Benitez** (10)	**Shea Stadium**	37,417	28–25
54	May 31	@ Marlins	6–5 (10)	**Roberts** (1–0)	Nunez (4–2)	**Benitez** (11)	Pro Player Stadium	18,177	29–25

June: (11–15) Home: 7–5; Away: 4–10

#	Date	Opponent	Score	Win	Loss	Save	Location	Attendance	Record
55	June 1	@ Marlins	7–9	Mairena (2–0)	**Komiyama** (0–2)	Nunez (13)	Pro Player Stadium	33,291	29–26
56	June 2	@ Marlins	3–7	Tavarez (3–3)	**Leiter** (5–5)	Nunez (14)	Pro Player Stadium	19,405	29–27
57	June 3	@ Braves	4–5	Hammond (2–2)	**Trachsel** (3–6)	Smoltz (15)	Turner Field	31,704	29–28
–	June 4	@ Braves	Postponed (rain); rescheduled for September 11						
58	June 5	@ Braves	4–6	Hammond (3–2)	**Strickland** (5–3)	Smoltz (16)	Turner Field	30,986	29–29
59	June 6	@ Braves	2–3	Glavine (10–2)	**Weathers** (2–2)	Smoltz (17)	Turner Field	41,286	29–30
60	June 7	@ Indians	4–3	**Leiter** (6–5)	Baez (5–5)	**Benitez** (12)	Jacobs Field	39,986	30–30
61	June 8	@ Indians	8–6	**Trachsel** (4–6)	Finley (4–7)	**Benitez** (13)	Jacobs Field	41,474	31–30
62	June 9	@ Indians	3–8	Drese (6–4)	**Estes** (2–5)	—	Jacobs Field	39,436	31–31
63	June 10	@ White Sox	3–1	**Astacio** (7–2)	Glover (2–2)	**Benitez** (14)	Comiskey Park	27,679	32–31
64	June 11	@ White Sox	8–10	Ritchie (4–8)	**D'Amico** (4–5)	Osuna (1)	Comiskey Park	20,156	32–32
65	June 12	@ White Sox	1–2	Biddle (1–0)	**Leiter** (6–6)	Osuna (2)	Comiskey Park	16,314	32–33
66	June 14	Yankees	2–4 (10)	Karsay (3–2)	**Komiyama** (0–3)	—	**Shea Stadium**	54,069	32–34
67	June 15	Yankees	8–0	**Estes** (3–5)	Clemens (8–3)	—	**Shea Stadium**	54,347	33–34
68	June 16	Yankees	3–2	**Guthrie** (1–0)	Wells (7–4)	**Benitez** (15)	**Shea Stadium**	55,141	34–34
69	June 18	Twins	1–6	Santana (2–1)	**D'Amico** (4–6)	—	**Shea Stadium**	35,947	34–35
70	June 19	Twins	4–2	**Leiter** (7–6)	Kinney (2–6)	**Benitez** (16)	**Shea Stadium**	26,967	35–35
71	June 20	Twins	3–2	**Trachsel** (5–6)	Fiore (5–2)	**Benitez** (17)	**Shea Stadium**	23,217	36–35
72	June 21	Royals	4–3	**Guthrie** (2–0)	Voyles (0–1)	—	**Shea Stadium**	37,547	37–35
73	June 22	Royals	1–5	Byrd (9–5)	**Astacio** (7–3)	—	**Shea Stadium**	44,790	37–36
74	June 23	Royals	5–4	**Strickland** (6–3)	Grimsley (2–3)	**Benitez** (18)	**Shea Stadium**	41,406	38–36
75	June 24	Braves	2–3	Gryboski (2–1)	**Strickland** (6–4)	Smoltz (24)	**Shea Stadium**	34,708	38–37
76	June 25	Braves	7–4	**Trachsel** (6–6)	Lopez (1–4)	**Benitez** (19)	**Shea Stadium**	31,607	39–37
77	June 26	Braves	3–6	Hammond (6–2)	**Weathers** (2–3)	Smoltz (25)	**Shea Stadium**	30,974	39–38
–	June 27	Braves	Postponed (rain); rescheduled for September 27						
78	June 28	@ Yankees	5–11	Mussina (11–3)	**D'Amico** (4–7)	Hernandez (1)	Yankee Stadium	55,739	39–39
79	June 29	@ Yankees	11–2	**Leiter** (8–6)	Lilly (3–6)	—	Yankee Stadium	55,615	40–39
80	June 30	@ Yankees	0–8	Pettitte (2–2)	**Trachsel** (6–7)	—	Yankee Stadium	55,700	40–40

July: (15–11) Home: 9–5; Away: 6–6

#	Date	Opponent	Score	Win	Loss	Save	Location	Attendance	Record
81	July 1	@ Phillies	3–6	Duckworth (5–5)	**Estes** (3–6)	Mesa (21)	Veterans Stadium	18,422	40–41
82	July 2	@ Phillies	12–6	**Astacio** (8–3)	Adams (4–6)	—	Veterans Stadium	20,826	41–41
83	July 3	@ Phillies	7–8	Plesac (3–3)	**Strickland** (6–5)	Mesa (22)	Veterans Stadium	50,396	41–42
84	July 4	@ Marlins	7–9	Tavarez (7–4)	**Leiter** (8–7)	—	Pro Player Stadium	15,765	41–43
85	July 5	@ Marlins	5–3	**Bacsik** (1–0)	Burnett (8–6)	**Benitez** (20)	Pro Player Stadium	11,498	42–43
86	July 6	@ Marlins	2–5	Tejera (5–1)	**Estes** (3–7)	Almanza (1)	Pro Player Stadium	21,038	42–44
87	July 7	@ Marlins	9–3	**Roberts** (2–0)	Mairena (2–2)	—	Pro Player Stadium	12,063	43–44
**73rd All-Star Game in Milwaukee, Wisconsin**
88	July 11	Phillies	9–1	**Guthrie** (3–0)	Cormier (4–5)	—	**Shea Stadium**	32,026	44–44
89	July 12	Phillies	8–9	Person (4–5)	**D'Amico** (4–8)	—	**Shea Stadium**	49,424	44–45
90	July 13	Phillies	6–7 (12)	Mercado (2–1)	**Strickland** (6–6)	Silva (1)	**Shea Stadium**	51,470	44–46
91	July 14	Phillies	4–2	**Astacio** (9–3)	Duckworth (5–7)	**Benitez** (21)	**Shea Stadium**	40,463	45–46
92	July 15	Marlins	8–3	**Bacsik** (2–0)	Penny (3–4)	—	**Shea Stadium**	39,706	46–46
93	July 16	Marlins	10–5	**Leiter** (9–7)	Beckett (2–4)	—	**Shea Stadium**	38,665	47–46
94	July 17	@ Expos	9–6	**Guthrie** (4–0)	Stewart (3–2)	—	Olympic Stadium	13,402	48–46
95	July 18	@ Expos	1–2	Colon (13–4)	**Corey** (0–2)	—	Olympic Stadium	13,797	48–47
96	July 19	@ Reds	4–2	**Astacio** (10–3)	Fernandez (1–1)	**Benitez** (22)	Cinergy Field	28,213	49–47
97	July 20	@ Reds	8–7	**Weathers** (3–3)	Reitsma (4–8)	**Benitez** (23)	Cinergy Field	40,168	50–47
98	July 21	@ Reds	1–9	Dessens (7–5)	**Leiter** (9–8)	—	Cinergy Field	27,309	50–48
99	July 22	Expos	5–2	**Weathers** (4–3)	Ohka (8–5)	**Benitez** (24)	**Shea Stadium**	23,655	51–48
100	July 23	Expos	4–3	**D'Amico** (5–8)	Colon (13–5)	**Benitez** (25)	**Shea Stadium**	36,289	52–48
101	July 24	Expos	1–2	Vazquez (8–6)	**Estes** (3–8)	Stewart (13)	**Shea Stadium**	28,526	52–49
102	July 26	Reds	3–2	**Guthrie** (5–0)	Riedling (0–1)	—	**Shea Stadium**	46,466	53–49
103	July 27	Reds	1–2 (11)	Graves (4–3)	**Corey** (0–3)	—	**Shea Stadium**	46,998	53–50
104	July 28	Reds	6–5	**Trachsel** (7–7)	Williamson (2–3)	**Benitez** (26)	**Shea Stadium**	37,391	54–50
105	July 30	Astros	3–16	Saarloos (3–2)	**D'Amico** (5–9)	—	**Shea Stadium**	33,492	54–51
106	July 31	Astros	10–0	**Estes** (4–8)	Mlicki (3–7)	—	**Shea Stadium**	39,423	55–51

August: (6–21) Home: 0–13; Away: 6–8

#	Date	Opponent	Score	Win	Loss	Save	Location	Attendance	Record
107	August 1	Astros	1–3	Oswalt (12–6)	**Astacio** (10–4)	Wagner (21)	**Shea Stadium**	29,865	55–52
–	August 2	Diamondbacks	Postponed (rain); rescheduled for August 3						
108	August 3 (1)	Diamondbacks	5–8 (10)	Kim (5–2)	**Strickland** (6–7)	—	**Shea Stadium**	N/A	55–53
109	August 3 (2)	Diamondbacks	2–9	Batista (6–7)	**Thomson** (7–9)	—	**Shea Stadium**	49,384	55–54
110	August 4	Diamondbacks	7–12	Koplove (3–0)	**Guthrie** (5–1)	Kim (27)	**Shea Stadium**	40,515	55–55
111	August 5	Diamondbacks	0–2	Johnson (16–4)	**Estes** (4–9)	—	**Shea Stadium**	47,190	55–56
112	August 6	@ Brewers	5–1	**Astacio** (11–4)	Sheets (5–14)	—	Miller Park	26,995	56–56
113	August 7	@ Brewers	2–6	Rusch (6–11)	**D'Amico** (5–10)	—	Miller Park	30,095	56–57
114	August 8	@ Brewers	9–0	**Trachsel** (8–7)	Wright (4–11)	—	Miller Park	35,042	57–57
115	August 9	@ Cardinals	2–1	**Leiter** (10–8)	Matthews (2–1)	**Benitez** (27)	Busch Stadium	44,299	58–57
116	August 10	@ Cardinals	4–5	Veres (5–7)	**Reed** (2–5)	Isringhausen (26)	Busch Stadium	44,934	58–58
117	August 11	@ Cardinals	0–9	Finley (7–13)	**Astacio** (11–5)	—	Busch Stadium	36,896	58–59
118	August 13	Padres	2–7	Peavy (4–4)	**Trachsel** (8–8)	Hoffman (29)	**Shea Stadium**	31,672	58–60
119	August 14	Padres	2–6	Lawrence (11–6)	**Leiter** (10–9)	Hoffman (30)	**Shea Stadium**	26,210	58–61
120	August 15	Padres	3–5	Tomko (6–8)	**Thomson** (7–10)	Hoffman (31)	**Shea Stadium**	27,182	58–62
121	August 16	Dodgers	2–3	Brown (3–3)	**Guthrie** (5–2)	Gagne (42)	**Shea Stadium**	35,089	58–63
122	August 17	Dodgers	4–10	Perez (11–8)	**Astacio** (11–6)	—	**Shea Stadium**	50,763	58–64
123	August 18	Dodgers	1–2	Ashby (9–9)	**Trachsel** (8–9)	Gagne (43)	**Shea Stadium**	42,386	58–65
124	August 20	@ Giants	0–1	Schmidt (8–6)	**Leiter** (10–10)	—	Pacific Bell Park	41,283	58–66
125	August 21	@ Giants	1–3	Rueter (11–7)	**Thomson** (7–11)	Nen (30)	Pacific Bell Park	41,021	58–67
126	August 22	@ Giants	1–3	Jensen (11–8)	**Bacsik** (2–1)	Nen (31)	Pacific Bell Park	41,207	58–68
127	August 23	@ Rockies	4–10	Jennings (15–5)	**Astacio** (11–7)	—	Coors Field	29,110	58–69
128	August 24	@ Rockies	5–2	**Weathers** (5–3)	Jimenez (2–9)	**Benitez** (28)	Coors Field	35,178	59–69
129	August 25	@ Rockies	7–4	**Leiter** (11–10)	Neagle (7–8)	**Benitez** (29)	Coors Field	27,386	60–69
130	August 27	@ Marlins	10–5	**Thomson** (8–11)	Tejera (8–6)	—	Pro Player Stadium	6,448	61–69
131	August 28	@ Marlins	3–7	Almanza (3–2)	**Strickland** (6–8)	—	Pro Player Stadium	6,909	61–70
132	August 30	Phillies	5–7	Padilla (14–8)	**Astacio** (11–8)	Mesa (39)	**Shea Stadium**	30,976	61–71
133	August 31	Phillies	0–1	Wolf (10–7)	**Trachsel** (8–10)	—	**Shea Stadium**	30,733	61–72

September: (14–14) Home: 8–7; Away: 6–7

#	Date	Opponent	Score	Win	Loss	Save	Location	Attendance	Record
134	September 1	Phillies	5–9	Myers (3–3)	**Leiter** (11–11)	—	**Shea Stadium**	28,781	61–73
–	September 2	Marlins	Postponed (rain); rescheduled for September 3						
135	September 3 (1)	Marlins	2–3 (12)	Looper (1–5)	**Strickland** (6–9)	—	**Shea Stadium**	N/A	61–74
136	September 3 (2)	Marlins	11–5	**Bacsik** (3–1)	Wayne (0–1)	—	**Shea Stadium**	21,007	62–74
137	September 4	Marlins	11–3	**Astacio** (12–8)	Tavarez (10–11)	—	**Shea Stadium**	28,473	63–74
138	September 5	Marlins	4–1	**Trachsel** (9–10)	Penny (6–5)	**Benitez** (30)	**Shea Stadium**	31,211	64–74
139	September 6	@ Phillies	7–2	**Leiter** (12–11)	Myers (3–4)	—	Veterans Stadium	16,335	65–74
140	September 7	@ Phillies	5–4	**Walker** (1–0)	Roa (3–3)	**Benitez** (31)	Veterans Stadium	21,747	66–74
141	September 8	@ Phillies	11–3	**Thomson** (9–11)	Duckworth (6–9)	—	Veterans Stadium	20,047	67–74
142	September 9	@ Phillies	6–4	**D'Amico** (6–10)	Timlin (4–5)	**Benitez** (32)	Veterans Stadium	13,514	68–74
143	September 10	@ Braves	6–12	Hodges (1–0)	**Astacio** (12–9)	—	Turner Field	28,214	68–75
144	September 11 (1)	@ Braves	5–8	Millwood (17–6)	**Trachsel** (9–11)	Smoltz (50)	Turner Field	19,802	68–76
145	September 11 (2)	@ Braves	5–0	**Leiter** (13–11)	Marquis (8–9)	—	Turner Field	26,734	69–76
146	September 12	@ Expos	8–2	**Middlebrook** (2–3)	Ohka (13–8)	—	Olympic Stadium	4,147	70–76
147	September 13	@ Expos	8–11	Colon (19–7)	**Thomson** (9–12)	Smith (1)	Olympic Stadium	7,219	70–77
148	September 14	@ Expos	4–5	Armas (10–12)	**Bacsik** (3–2)	Smith (2)	Olympic Stadium	17,278	70–78
149	September 15	@ Expos	1–10	Vazquez (10–13)	**Astacio** (12–10)	—	Olympic Stadium	16,608	70–79
150	September 17	Cubs	3–1	**Weathers** (6–3)	Cruz (2–11)	—	**Shea Stadium**	36,772	71–79
151	September 18	Cubs	2–1	**Trachsel** (10–11)	Wood (11–10)	**Benitez** (33)	**Shea Stadium**	28,190	72–79
152	September 19	Cubs	3–2 (12)	**Roberts** (3–0)	Cunnane (1–1)	—	**Shea Stadium**	34,664	73–79
153	September 20	Expos	1–6	Armas (11–12)	**Thomson** (9–13)	—	**Shea Stadium**	23,675	73–80
154	September 21	Expos	6–3 (11)	**Benitez** (1–0)	Smith (1–1)	—	**Shea Stadium**	30,946	74–80
155	September 22	Expos	1–5	Day (4–1)	**Leiter** (13–12)	—	**Shea Stadium**	36,730	74–81
156	September 24	@ Pirates	3–6	Sauerbeck (5–4)	**Guthrie** (5–3)	Williams (45)	PNC Park	13,249	74–82
157	September 25	@ Pirates	3–4	Villone (4–6)	**Roberts** (3–1)	Williams (46)	PNC Park	11,641	74–83
–	September 26	@ Pirates	Cancelled (rain)						
158	September 27 (1)	Braves	1–3	Maddux (16–6)	**Thomson** (9–14)	Smoltz (54)	**Shea Stadium**	N/A	74–84
159	September 27 (2)	Braves	4–7	Millwood (18–8)	**Astacio** (12–11)	—	**Shea Stadium**	33,527	74–85
160	September 28	Braves	2–5	Hodges (2–0)	**Leiter** (13–13)	Smoltz (55)	**Shea Stadium**	38,988	74–86
161	September 29	Braves	6–1	**Trachsel** (11–11)	Remlinger (7–3)	—	**Shea Stadium**	37,721	75–86

== Roster ==
2002 New York Mets
Roster
Pitchers: 34 Pedro Astacio; 33 Mike Bacsik; 49 Armando Benítez; 43 Jaime Cerda; 32 Bruce Chen; 27 Mark Corey; 18 Jeff D'Amico; 48 Kane Davis; 55 Shawn Estes; 55 Pedro Feliciano; 53 Mark Guthrie; 21 Bobby Jones; 17 Satoru Komiyama; 22 Al Leiter; 27 Jason Middlebrook; 39 Steve Reed; 36 Grant Roberts; 38 Jae Seo; 38 Pat Strange; 25 Scott Strickland; 50 John Thomson; 29 Steve Trachsel; 43 Pete Walker; 46 Tyler Walker; 35 David Weathers	Catchers: 7 Jason Phillips; 31 Mike Piazza; 3 Vance Wilson; Infielders: 13 Edgardo Alfonzo; 12 Roberto Alomar; 5 Mark Johnson; 10 Rey Ordóñez; 26 Marco Scutaro; 4 John Valentin; 42 Mo Vaughn; 9 Ty Wigginton	Outfielders: 20 Jeromy Burnitz; 19 Roger Cedeño; 23 McKay Christensen; 15 Brady Clark; 21 Raul González; 21 Mark Little; 25 Gary Matthews, Jr.; 47 Joe McEwing; 44 Jay Payton; 6 Timo Pérez; 23 Esix Snead; 40 Tony Tarasco	Manager: 2 Bobby Valentine; Coaches: 51 Chris Chambliss (hitting); 53 Dave Engle (hitting); 8 Matt Galante (third base); 54 Charlie Hough (pitching); 60 Juan Lopez; 52 Randy Niemann (bullpen); 57 Tom Robson (bench); 1 Mookie Wilson (first base)

== Player stats ==
=== Batting ===
==== Starters by position ====
Note: Pos = Position; G = Games played; AB = At bats; H = Hits; Avg. = Batting average; HR = Home runs; RBI = Runs batted in

Pos	Player	G	AB	H	Avg.	HR	RBI
C	Mike Piazza	135	478	134	.280	33	98
1B	Mo Vaughn	139	487	126	.259	26	72
2B	Roberto Alomar	149	590	157	.266	11	53
SS	Rey Ordóñez	144	460	117	.254	1	42
3B	Edgardo Alfonzo	135	490	151	.308	16	56
LF	Roger Cedeño	149	511	133	.260	7	41
CF	Timo Pérez	136	444	131	.295	8	47
RF	Jeromy Burnitz	154	479	103	.215	19	54

==== Other batters ====
Note: G = Games played; AB = At bats; H = Hits; Avg. = Batting average; HR = Home runs; RBI = Runs batted in

Player	G	AB	H	Avg.	HR	RBI
Jay Payton	87	275	78	.284	8	31
John Valentin	114	208	50	.240	3	30
Joe McEwing	105	196	39	.199	3	26
Vance Wilson	74	163	40	.245	5	26
Ty Wigginton	46	116	35	.302	6	18
Tony Tarasco	60	96	24	.250	6	15
Raúl González	30	81	21	.259	3	11
Mark Johnson	42	51	7	.137	1	4
Marco Scutaro	27	36	8	.222	1	6
Jason Phillips	11	19	7	.368	1	3
Esix Snead	17	13	4	.308	1	3
Brady Clark	10	12	5	.417	0	1
McKay Christensen	4	3	1	.333	0	0
Mark Little	3	3	0	.000	0	0
Gary Matthews Jr.	2	1	0	.000	0	0

=== Pitching ===
==== Starting pitchers ====
Note: G = Games pitched; IP = Innings pitched; W = Wins; L = Losses; ERA = Earned run average; SO = Strikeouts

Player	G	IP	W	L	ERA	SO
Al Leiter	33	204.1	13	13	3.48	172
Pedro Astacio	31	191.2	12	11	4.79	152
Steve Trachsel	30	173.2	11	11	3.37	105
Jeff D'Amico	29	145.2	6	10	4.94	101
Shawn Estes	23	132.2	4	9	4.55	92
Mike Bacsik	11	55.2	3	2	4.37	30
John Thomson	9	54.1	2	6	4.31	31
Jason Middlebrook	3	16.0	1	0	3.94	14

==== Other pitchers ====
Note: G = Games pitched; IP = Innings pitched; W = Wins; L = Losses; ERA = Earned run average; SO = Strikeouts

Player	G	IP	W	L	ERA	SO
Tyler Walker	5	10.2	1	0	5.91	7

==== Relief pitchers ====
Note: G = Games pitched; W = Wins; L = Losses; SV = Saves; ERA = Earned run average; SO = Strikeouts

Player	G	W	L	SV	ERA	SO
Armando Benítez	62	1	0	33	2.27	79
David Weathers	71	6	3	0	2.91	61
Scott Strickland	68	6	9	2	3.59	67
Mark Guthrie	68	5	3	1	2.44	44
Grant Roberts	34	3	1	0	2.20	31
Jaime Cerda	32	0	0	0	2.45	21
Satoru Komiyama	25	0	3	0	5.61	33
Steve Reed	24	0	1	0	2.08	14
Kane Davis	16	1	1	0	7.07	24
Bobby Jones	12	0	0	0	5.29	11
Mark Corey	12	0	3	0	4.50	9
Pedro Feliciano	6	0	0	0	7.50	4
Pat Strange	5	0	0	0	1.13	4
Jae Weong Seo	1	0	0	0	0.00	1
Pete Walker	1	0	0	0	9.00	0
Bruce Chen	1	0	0	0	0.00	0

== Awards and honors ==
2002 MLB All Star Game

- Mike Piazza, catcher

== Farm system ==
Level	Team	League	Manager
AAA	Norfolk Tides	International League	Bobby Floyd
AA	Binghamton Mets	Eastern League	Howie Freiling
A	St. Lucie Mets	Florida State League	Ken Oberkfell
A	Capital City Bombers	South Atlantic League	Tony Tijerina
A-Short Season	Brooklyn Cyclones	New York–Penn League	Howard Johnson
Rookie	Kingsport Mets	Appalachian League	Joey Cora
