= 2002 Colorado Rockies season =

2002 Colorado Rockies
- League: National League
- Division: West
- Ballpark: Coors Field
- City: Denver, Colorado
- Record: 73–89 (.451)
- Divisional place: 4th
- Owner: Jerry McMorris
- General manager: Dan O'Dowd
- Manager: Buddy Bell and Clint Hurdle
- Television: KWGN-TV; Fox Sports Rocky Mountain (George Frazier, Drew Goodman, Jack Corrigan)
- Radio: KOA (AM) (Jack Corrigan, Jeff Kingery, Wayne Hagin); KCUV (Antonio Guevara)
- Stats: ESPN.com; Baseball Reference

The Colorado Rockies' 2002 season was the tenth for the Rockies. They tried to win the National League West. Buddy Bell and Clint Hurdle were the managers, the latter replacing the former after the former was fired 22 games into the season. Hurdle won 67 out of 140 games and was kept on as manager for the following season. They played home games at Coors Field. They finished with a record of 73–89, fourth in the NL West.

== Offseason ==
- December 16, 2001: Jeff Cirillo was traded by the Colorado Rockies to the Seattle Mariners for Brian Fuentes, Denny Stark, and José Paniagua.
- January 7, 2002: Mike Myers was traded by the Colorado Rockies to the Arizona Diamondbacks for J.D. Closser and Jack Cust.
- January 11, 2002: Todd Jones was signed as a free agent by the Colorado Rockies.
- January 21, 2002: Ross Gload was traded by the Colorado Rockies with Craig House to the New York Mets for Todd Zeile, Benny Agbayani, and cash.
- January 26, 2002: Ross Gload was purchased by the Colorado Rockies from the New York Mets.
- February 7, 2002: Kent Mercker was signed as a free agent by the Colorado Rockies.
- March 31, 2002: Bobby Estalella was signed as a free agent by the Colorado Rockies.

== Regular season ==
=== Season standings ===
==== National League West ====
NL West
Team	W	L	Pct.	GB	Home	Road
Arizona Diamondbacks	98	64	.605	—	55‍–‍26	43‍–‍38
San Francisco Giants	95	66	.590	2½	50‍–‍31	45‍–‍35
Los Angeles Dodgers	92	70	.568	6	46‍–‍35	46‍–‍35
Colorado Rockies	73	89	.451	25	47‍–‍34	26‍–‍55
San Diego Padres	66	96	.407	32	41‍–‍40	25‍–‍56

==== Record vs. opponents ====
2002 National League record Source: MLB Standings Grid – 2002
Team	AZ	ATL	CHC	CIN	COL	FLA	HOU	LAD	MIL	MON	NYM	PHI	PIT	SD	SF	STL	AL
Arizona	—	3–3	4–2	6–0	14–5	5–1	3–3	9–10	4–2	4–2	5–2	4–3	4–2	12–7	8–11	2–4	11–7
Atlanta	3–3	—	4–2	4–2	4–3	11–8	3–3	2–4	5–1	13–6	12–7	11–7	3–3	3–3	3–3–1	5–1	15–3
Chicago	2–4	2–4	—	5–12	4–2	4–2	8–11	2–4	7–10	3–3	1–5	2–4	10–9	2–4	3–3	6–12	6–6
Cincinnati	0–6	2–4	12–5	—	3–3	5–1	6–11	4–2	13–6	1–5	2–4	2–4	11–7	5–1	2–4	8–11	2–10
Colorado	5–14	3–4	2–4	3–3	—	5–2	3–3	7–12	3–3	4–2	3–3	3–3	4–2	11–8	8–12	2–4	7–11
Florida	1–5	8–11	2–4	1–5	2–5	—	3–3	3–3	4–2	10–9	8–11	10–9	4–2	5–1	4–3	4–2	10–8
Houston	3–3	3–3	11–8	11–6	3–3	3–3	—	3–3	10–8	3–3	4–2	3–3	11–6	4–2	1–5	6–13	5–7
Los Angeles	10–9	4–2	4–2	2–4	12–7	3–3	3–3	—	5–1	5–2	4–2	4–3	4–2	10–9	8–11	2–4	12–6
Milwaukee	2–4	1–5	10–7	6–13	3–3	2–4	8–10	1–5	—	2–4	1–5	1–5	4–15	5–1	1–5	7–10	2–10
Montreal	2–4	6–13	3–3	5–1	2–4	9–10	3–3	2–5	4–2	—	11–8	11–8	3–3	3–4	4–2	3–3	12–6
New York	2–5	7–12	5–1	4–2	3–3	11–8	2–4	2–4	5–1	8–11	—	9–10	1–4	3–4	0–6	3–3	10–8
Philadelphia	3–4	7–11	4–2	4–2	3–3	9–10	3–3	3–4	5–1	8–11	10–9	—	2–4	2–4	3–3	4–2	10–8
Pittsburgh	2–4	3–3	9–10	7–11	2–4	2–4	6–11	2–4	15–4	3–3	4–1	4–2	—	2–4	2–4	6–11	3–9
San Diego	7–12	3–3	4–2	1–5	8–11	1–5	2–4	9–10	1–5	4–3	4–3	4–2	4–2	—	5–14	1–5	8–10
San Francisco	11–8	3–3–1	3–3	4–2	11–8	3–4	5–1	11–8	5–1	2–4	6–0	3–3	4–2	14–5	—	2–4	8–10
St. Louis	4–2	1–5	12–6	11–8	4–2	2–4	13–6	4–2	10–7	3–3	3–3	2–4	11–6	5–1	4–2	—	8–4

=== Notable transactions ===
- June 4, 2002: Jeff Francis was drafted by the Colorado Rockies in the 1st round of the 2002 amateur draft. Player signed June 19, 2002.
- July 29, 2002: Sandy Alomar Jr. was traded by the Chicago White Sox to the Colorado Rockies for Enemencio Pacheco (minors).
- July 31, 2002: Todd Hollandsworth was traded by the Colorado Rockies with Dennys Reyes to the Texas Rangers for Gabe Kapler, Jason Romano and cash.
- July 31, 2002: John Thomson was traded by the Colorado Rockies with Mark Little to the New York Mets for Jay Payton, Mark Corey, and Robert Stratton (minors).

=== Major League debuts ===
- Pitchers:
  - Aaron Cook (Aug 10)
  - Cory Vance (Sep 21)

=== Roster ===
2002 Colorado Rockies
Roster
Pitchers: 56 Shawn Chacón; 35 Aaron Cook; 46 Mark Corey; 51 Randy Flores; 39 Brian Fuentes; 10 Mike Hampton; 48 Mike James; 32 Jason Jennings; 16 José Jiménez; 59 Todd Jones; 52 Sean Lowe; 54 Kent Mercker; 15 Denny Neagle; 47 Chris Nichting; 49 Dennys Reyes; 45 Víctor Santos; 30 Justin Speier; 41 Denny Stark; 52 John Thomson; 53 Cory Vance; 51 Rick White	Catchers: 25 Sandy Alomar Jr.; 29 Gary Bennett; 8 Bobby Estalella; 26 Walt McKeel; 6 Ben Petrick; Infielders: 5 Brent Butler; 17 Todd Helton; 14 Greg Norton; 12 José Ortiz; 3 Jason Romano; 22 Terry Shumpert; 4 Juan Uribe; 7 Todd Zeile	Outfielders: 50 Benny Agbayani; 21 Jack Cust; 23 Ross Gload; 27 Todd Hollandsworth; 19 Gabe Kapler; 19 Mark Little; 27 Jay Payton; 9 Juan Pierre; 33 Larry Walker	Manager: 25 Buddy Bell; 13 Clint Hurdle; Coaches: 44 Alan Cockrell (hitting); 26 Rich Donnelly (third base); 2 Mike Gallego (third base); 1 Dave Garcia (asst. coach); 11 Toby Harrah (bench); 13 Clint Hurdle (hitting); 18 Fred Kendall (bullpen); 20 Dallas Williams (first base); 55 Jim Wright (pitching)

=== Game log ===
2002 Game Log
April: 10-16

#	Date	Opponent	Score	Win	Loss	Save	Attendance	Record
1	April 1	@ Cardinals	10–2	Morris (1–0)	Hampton (0–1)		48,397	0–1
2	April 3	@ Cardinals	6–3	Neagle (1–0)	Stephenson (0–1)	Jiménez (1)	26,557	1–1
3	April 4	@ Cardinals	6–1	Thomson (1–0)	Benes (0–1)		27,691	2–1
4	April 5	@ Dodgers	9–0	Ashby (1–0)	Chacón (0–1)		25,091	2–2
5	April 6	@ Dodgers	9–2	Ishii (1–0)	Jennings (0–1)		38,693	2–3
6	April 7	@ Dodgers	6–4	Brown (1–1)	Hampton (0–2)	Gagné (1)	28,452	2–4
7	April 8	Astros	8–4	Oswalt (2–0)	Neagle (1–1)		50,392	2–5
8	April 9	Astros	10–5	Thomson (2–0)	Reynolds (1–1)		30,153	3–5
9	April 10	Astros	4–1	Chacón (1–1)	Mlicki (0–2)	Jiménez (2)	29,552	4–5
10	April 11	Diamondbacks	8–4	Johnson (3–0)	Reyes (0–1)		31,714	4–6
11	April 12	Diamondbacks	8–3	Schilling (3–0)	Hampton (0–3)		40,832	4–7
12	April 13	Diamondbacks	7–5 (10)	Myers (1–1)	Jiménez (0–1)		42,596	4–8
13	April 14	Diamondbacks	6–3	Batista (1–0)	Thomson (2–1)	Kim (2)	42,298	4–9
14	April 15	Dodgers	5–2	Pérez (1–1)	Chacón (1–2)		29,763	4–10
15	April 16	Dodgers	6–4	Jennings (1–1)	Ashby (1–1)	Jiménez (3)	30,354	5–10
16	April 17	Dodgers	6–3	Ishii (3–0)	White (0–1)	Gagné (5)	32,878	5–11
17	April 19	@ Diamondbacks	8–6	Neagle (2–1)	Anderson (0–2)	Jiménez (4)	37,443	6–11
18	April 20	@ Diamondbacks	9–8	Helling (2–2)	Thomson (2–2)	Myers (2)	47,627	6–12
19	April 21	@ Diamondbacks	7–1	Johnson (5–0)	Chacón (1–3)		43,891	6–13
20	April 23	@ Reds	3–2	Haynes (2–2)	Jennings (1–2)	Graves (7)	14,518	6–14
21	April 24	@ Reds	4–3	Williamson (1–0)	Jiménez (0–2)		13,004	6–15
22	April 25	@ Reds	4–3	Sullivan (2–0)	White (0–2)	Graves (8)	14,416	6–16
23	April 26	Phillies	4–1	Thomson (3–2)	Adams (0–3)	Jiménez (5)	37,551	7–16
24	April 27	Phillies	8–6	Chacón (2–3)	Duckworth (1–2)	Jiménez (6)	38,064	8–16
25	April 28	Phillies	4–2	Jennings (2–2)	Wolf (1–1)	Jiménez (7)	40,357	9–16
26	April 30	Pirates	10–0	Hampton (1–3)	Williams (2–3)		30,759	10–16

May: 19-10

#	Date	Opponent	Score	Win	Loss	Save	Attendance	Record
27	May 1	Pirates	6–0	Neagle (3–1)	Fogg (3–1)		29,529	11–16
28	May 2	Pirates	7–2	Thomson (4–2)	Villone (2–4)		30,134	12–16
29	May 3	@ Phillies	3–2	Duckworth (2–2)	Chacón (2–4)	Mesa (7)	15,257	12–17
30	May 4	@ Phillies	6–5	Mercado (1–0)	White (0–3)	Mesa (8)	16,205	12–18
31	May 5	@ Phillies	7–4	Padilla (4–2)	Hampton (1–4)	Mesa (9)	32,411	12–19
32	May 7	@ Expos	5–3	Thomson (5–2)	Armas (4–3)	Jiménez (8)	3,780	13–19
33	May 8	@ Expos	5–0	Chacón (3–4)	Pavano (2–4)		5,220	14–19
34	May 9	@ Expos	6–5 (12)	Lloyd (1–2)	White (0–4)		3,183	14–20
35	May 10	@ Mets	9–5	Jennings (3–2)	D'Amico (2–3)		37,484	15–20
36	May 11	@ Mets	4–3	Leiter (4–2)	Hampton (1–5)	Strickland (1)	41,605	15–21
37	May 12	@ Mets	4–3 (13)	White (1–4)	Davis (1–1)	Jiménez (9)	33,578	16–21
38	May 13	Marlins	7–3	Stark (1–0)	Penny (3–2)		29,971	17–21
39	May 14	Marlins	6–2	Beckett (1–2)	Neagle (3–2)	Núñez (8)	28,651	17–22
40	May 15	Marlins	7–2	Jennings (4–2)	Burnett (5–3)		27,898	18–22
41	May 16	Marlins	10–3	Hampton (2–5)	Tavárez (1–3)		28,197	19–22
42	May 17	Braves	4–2	Glavine (6–2)	Thomson (5–3)	Smoltz (12)	40,357	19–23
43	May 18	Braves	7–3	Stark (2–0)	Millwood (2–5)		42,780	20–23
44	May 19	Braves	2–1	Remlinger (2–0)	Nichting (0–1)	Smoltz (13)	43,151	20–24
45	May 21	Padres	7–6	Speier (1–0)	Embree (3–2)	Jiménez (10)	30,616	21–24
46	May 22	Padres	5–3	Mercker (1–0)	Fikac (3–3)	Jiménez (11)	29,204	22–24
47	May 23	Padres	16–3	Thomson (6–3)	Tomko (3–4)		30,701	23–24
48	May 24	Giants	8–5	Stark (3–0)	Ortiz (4–3)	Jiménez (12)	37,627	24–24
49	May 25	Giants	6–3	Nichting (1–1)	Rueter (6–2)	Jiménez (13)	41,957	25–24
50	May 26	Giants	10–6	Jennings (5–2)	Jensen (4–4)		48,073	26–24
51	May 27	@ Padres	8–5	Lawrence (5–3)	Hampton (2–6)	Hoffman (14)	15,666	26–25
52	May 28	@ Padres	3–2 (12)	Jiménez (1–2)	Fikac (3–4)	Speier (1)	13,998	27–25
53	May 29	@ Padres	11–3	Middlebrook (1–1)	Stark (3–1)		13,421	27–26
54	May 30	@ Padres	4–2	Neagle (4–2)	Jones (3–3)	Jiménez (14)	18,755	28–26
55	May 31	@ Giants	6–2	Jennings (6–2)	Jensen (4–5)	Jones (1)	38,337	29–26

June: 10-17

#	Date	Opponent	Score	Win	Loss	Save	Attendance	Record
56	June 1	@ Giants	5–4	Hampton (3–6)	Hernández (5–5)	Jiménez (15)	40,893	30–26
57	June 2	@ Giants	9–2	Schmidt (1–1)	Thomson (6–4)		40,651	30–27
58	June 3	Dodgers	11–5	Mota (1–0)	Jiménez (1–3)		30,150	30–28
59	June 4	Dodgers	10–4	Orosco (1–1)	Jones (0–1)		30,195	30–29
60	June 5	Dodgers	8–6	Jennings (7–2)	Daal (4–2)	Jiménez (16)	31,793	31–29
61	June 7	@ Blue Jays	8–0	Halladay (7–2)	Hampton (3–7)		20,032	31–30
62	June 8	@ Blue Jays	3–1	Walker (2–0)	Thomson (6–5)	Escobar (12)	21,298	31–31
63	June 9	@ Blue Jays	3–2	Escobar (3–2)	Jiménez (1–4)		20,328	31–32
64	June 10	@ Red Sox	7–3	Lowe (10–2)	Neagle (4–3)	Wakefield (3)	33,508	31–33
65	June 11	@ Red Sox	3–1	Jennings (8–2)	Fossum (2–1)	Jiménez (17)	32,340	32–33
66	June 12	@ Red Sox	7–5	Castillo (5–6)	Hampton (3–8)	Urbina (19)	31,583	32–34
67	June 14	Indians	5–3	Drese (7–4)	Thomson (6–6)	Wickman (15)	40,156	32–35
68	June 15	Indians	7–4	Jones (1–1)	Paronto (0–2)	Jiménez (18)	41,870	33–35
69	June 16	Indians	5–4	Colón (9–4)	Neagle (4–4)	Wickman (16)	40,792	33–36
70	June 18	Yankees	10–5	Mussina (10–3)	Jennings (8–3)	Stanton (1)	48,738	33–37
71	June 19	Yankees	20–10	Mendoza (4–2)	White (1–5)		48,821	33–38
72	June 20	Yankees	14–11 (10)	Stark (4–1)	Karsay (3–3)		48,916	34–38
73	June 21	Devil Rays	8–7 (10)	Speier (2–0)	Yan (3–3)		30,284	35–38
74	June 22	Devil Rays	6–5 (11)	Jiménez (2–4)	Kent (0–2)		31,190	36–38
75	June 23	Devil Rays	6–5	White (2–5)	Kennedy (5–6)	Jiménez (19)	31,043	37–38
76	June 24	@ Dodgers	4–1	Hampton (4–8)	Ishii (11–3)	Jiménez (20)	34,641	38–38
77	June 25	@ Dodgers	4–0	Pérez (9–3)	Thomson (6–7)		23,635	38–39
78	June 26	@ Dodgers	5–3	Nomo (8–5)	Chacón (3–5)	Gagné (28)	25,083	38–40
79	June 27	@ Dodgers	7–1	Daal (6–3)	Neagle (4–5)		41,279	38–41
80	June 28	@ Mariners	6–2	Piñeiro (8–3)	Jennings (8–4)		45,118	38–42
81	June 29	@ Mariners	8–1	García (11–5)	Hampton (4–9)		45,790	38–43
82	June 30	@ Mariners	4–3	Speier (3–0)	Sasaki (2–2)	Jiménez (21)	45,928	39–43

July: 9-16

#	Date	Opponent	Score	Win	Loss	Save	Attendance	Record
83	July 1	Giants	8–6	Rodríguez (3–4)	Jiménez (2–5)	Nen (22)	31,115	39–44
84	July 2	Giants	18–5	Jensen (8–6)	Neagle (4–6)		30,838	39–45
85	July 3	Giants	14–4	Jennings (9–4)	Hernández (6–10)		48,504	40–45
86	July 5	Padres	9–6	Hampton (5–9)	Tomko (4–6)	Jiménez (22)	48,540	41–45
87	July 6	Padres	3–2	Thomson (7–7)	Peavy (0–3)	Jiménez (23)	36,866	42–45
88	July 7	Padres	7–1	Pérez (3–1)	Chacón (3–6)		30,707	42–46
89	July 11	@ Giants	3–2	Worrell (6–0)	Jiménez (2–6)		39,644	42–47
90	July 12	@ Giants	9–0	Hernández (7–10)	Hampton (5–10)		40,963	42–48
91	July 13	@ Giants	6–1	Schmidt (5–3)	Thomson (7–8)		41,434	42–49
92	July 14	@ Giants	5–3	Chacón (4–6)	Rueter (7–6)		41,980	43–49
93	July 15	@ Padres	5–0	Stark (5–1)	Pérez (3–2)		37,827	44–49
94	July 16	@ Padres	5–1	Peavy (1–3)	Jennings (9–5)	Reed (1)	22,150	44–50
95	July 17	Diamondbacks	12–3	Schilling (16–3)	Hampton (5–11)		39,023	44–51
96	July 18	Diamondbacks	6–4	Speier (4–0)	Swindell (0–1)	Jiménez (24)	35,799	45–51
97	July 19	Brewers	9–5	Chacón (5–6)	Quevedo (5–7)		34,347	46–51
98	July 20	Brewers	6–5	Stark (6–1)	Cabrera (4–7)	Jiménez (25)	37,009	47–51
99	July 21	Brewers	6–4	Jennings (10–5)	Sheets (4–12)	Jiménez (26)	31,597	48–51
100	July 22	@ Diamondbacks	5–1	Schilling (17–3)	Hampton (5–12)		34,516	48–52
101	July 23	@ Diamondbacks	8–5	Kim (4–1)	Jones (1–2)		37,837	48–53
102	July 24	@ Diamondbacks	7–1	Batista (5–7)	Chacón (5–7)		34,743	48–54
103	July 26	@ Brewers	10–3	Sheets (5–12)	Stark (6–2)	Vizcaíno (3)	29,270	48–55
104	July 27	@ Brewers	6–5 (10)	DeJean (1–4)	Jiménez (2–7)		33,497	48–56
105	July 28	@ Brewers	5–3	Wright (3–10)	Hampton (5–13)	DeJean (17)	26,535	48–57
106	July 30	@ Pirates	4–1	Benson (4–5)	Neagle (4–7)	Williams (31)	23,749	48–58
107	July 31	@ Pirates	7–6	Boehringer (3–3)	White (2–6)	Williams (32)	18,106	48–59

August: 13-16

#	Date	Opponent	Score	Win	Loss	Save	Attendance	Record
108	August 1	@ Pirates	3–0	Jennings (11–5)	Meadows (0–1)	Jiménez (27)	19,075	49–59
109	August 2	@ Cubs	6–4 (12)	Borowski (3–4)	Santos (0–1)		38,493	49–60
110	August 3	@ Cubs	2–1	Neagle (5–7)	Clement (8–8)	Jiménez (28)	39,385	50–60
111	August 4	@ Cubs	4–1	Prior (5–3)	Chacón (5–8)		38,474	50–61
112	August 6	Reds	7–6	Stark (7–2)	Moehler (2–3)	Jiménez (29)	32,780	51–61
113	August 7	Reds	7–2	Jennings (12–5)	Hamilton (3–7)		32,483	52–61
114	August 8	Reds	10–3	Hampton (6–13)	Haynes (12–7)		30,218	53–61
115	August 9	Cubs	2–0	Neagle (6–7)	Zambrano (2–3)	Jiménez (30)	41,131	54–61
116	August 10	Cubs	15–1	Prior (6–3)	Chacón (5–9)		45,474	54–62
117	August 11	Cubs	12–9	Smyth (1–0)	Stark (7–3)		37,016	54–63
118	August 12	@ Marlins	1–0	Jennings (13–5)	Burnett (11–9)	Jiménez (31)	5,090	55–63
119	August 13	@ Marlins	5–4	Hampton (7–13)	Núñez (5–5)	Jiménez (32)	4,729	56–63
120	August 14	@ Marlins	1–0	Lloyd (3–3)	Santos (0–2)		4,746	56–64
121	August 16	@ Braves	4–1	Millwood (12–6)	Chacón (5–10)	Smoltz (43)	30,504	56–65
122	August 17	@ Braves	10–3	Stark (8–3)	Marquis (8–7)		46,104	57–65
123	August 18	@ Braves	6–3	Jennings (14–5)	Maddux (11–5)	Jiménez (33)	30,399	58–65
124	August 19	@ Braves	7–6	Smoltz (3–2)	Jiménez (2–8)		24,568	58–66
125	August 20	Expos	8–6	Neagle (7–7)	Vázquez (8–10)	Jiménez (34)	28,278	59–66
126	August 21	Expos	13–5	Yoshii (4–5)	Chacón (5–11)		27,916	59–67
127	August 22	Expos	14–6	Stark (9–3)	Armas (8–11)		27,231	60–67
128	August 23	Mets	10–4	Jennings (15–5)	Astacio (11–7)		29,110	61–67
129	August 24	Mets	5–2	Weathers (5–3)	Jiménez (2–9)	Benítez (28)	35,178	61–68
130	August 25	Mets	7–4	Leiter (11–10)	Neagle (7–8)	Benítez (29)	27,386	61–69
131	August 26	Giants	4–3	Rodríguez (4–6)	Jones (1–3)	Nen (32)	26,877	61–70
132	August 27	Giants	7–4	Rodríguez (5–6)	Jones (1–4)	Nen (33)	26,592	61–71
133	August 28	Giants	9–1	Ortiz (9–10)	Jennings (15–6)		27,080	61–72
134	August 29	Giants	10–6	Hernández (9–14)	Hampton (7–14)		26,330	61–73
135	August 30	@ Padres	2–0	Tomko (8–8)	Neagle (7–9)	Hoffman (33)	15,987	61–74
136	August 31	@ Padres	3–0	Condrey (1–0)	Cook (0–1)	Hoffman (34)	31,043	61–75

September: 12-14

#	Date	Opponent	Score	Win	Loss	Save	Attendance	Record
137	September 1	@ Padres	9–5	Nickle (1–0)	Santos (0–3)	Hoffman (35)	21,190	61–76
138	September 2	@ Padres	5–2	Jennings (16–6)	Jones (7–8)	Jiménez (35)	31,837	62–76
139	September 3	@ Giants	4–2	Ortiz (10–10)	Hampton (7–15)	Nen (35)	33,483	62–77
140	September 4	@ Giants	2–1	Neagle (8–9)	Hernández (9–15)	Jiménez (36)	34,342	63–77
141	September 6	Padres	7–3	Cook (1–1)	Eaton (0–1)		26,243	64–77
142	September 7	Padres	5–3	Mercker (2–0)	Holtz (2–2)	Jiménez (37)	26,444	65–77
143	September 8	Padres	9–4	Lawrence (12–10)	Jennings (16–7)	Hoffman (36)	25,706	65–78
144	September 9	@ Astros	6–5 (10)	Lidge (1–0)	Flores (0–1)		28,330	65–79
145	September 10	@ Astros	11–4	Miller (13–3)	Neagle (8–10)		24,812	65–80
146	September 11	@ Astros	8–6	Cook (2–1)	Saarloos (6–5)	Jiménez (38)	29,185	66–80
147	September 12	Dodgers	7–1	Stark (10–3)	Daal (11–8)		25,593	67–80
148	September 13	Dodgers	5–4	Mercker (3–0)	Mota (1–3)	Jiménez (39)	26,441	68–80
149	September 14	Dodgers	16–3	Pérez (14–9)	Santos (0–4)		28,118	68–81
150	September 15	Dodgers	5–4	Speier (5–0)	Ashby (9–12)	Jiménez (40)	26,011	69–81
151	September 17	Cardinals	11–4	Fassero (8–6)	Mercker (3–1)		25,833	69–82
152	September 18	Cardinals	8–5	White (4–6)	Speier (5–1)	Kline (6)	25,330	69–83
153	September 19	Cardinals	12–6	Simontacchi (11–5)	Jennings (16–8)		25,567	69–84
154	September 20	Diamondbacks	9–4	Lowe (5–2)	Schilling (23–6)		37,842	70–84
155	September 21	Diamondbacks	15–8	Fuentes (1–0)	Fetters (3–2)		29,484	71–84
156	September 22	Diamondbacks	11–7	Fuentes (2–0)	Swindell (0–2)		26,520	72–84
157	September 24	@ Dodgers	1–0	Stark (11–3)	Pérez (15–10)	Jiménez (41)	30,332	73–84
158	September 25	@ Dodgers	3–2	Gagné (3–1)	Jiménez (2–10)		28,189	73–85
159	September 26	@ Diamondbacks	4–2	Johnson (24–5)	Flores (0–2)		33,605	73–86
160	September 27	@ Diamondbacks	8–6	Batista (8–9)	Neagle (8–11)	Kim (35)	39,693	73–87
161	September 28	@ Diamondbacks	17–8	Helling (10–12)	Lowe (5–3)		45,052	73–88
162	September 29	@ Diamondbacks	11–8	Patterson (2–0)	Stark (11–4)	Kim (36)	45,553	73–89

== Player stats ==
= Indicates team leader

=== Batting ===
==== Starters by position ====
Note: Pos = Position; G = Games played; AB = At bats; H = Hits; Avg. = Batting average; HR = Home runs; RBI = Runs batted in

Pos	Player	G	AB	H	Avg.	HR	RBI
C	Gary Bennett	90	291	77	.265	4	26
1B	Todd Helton	156	553	182	.329	30	109
2B	Brent Butler	113	344	89	.259	9	42
SS	Juan Uribe	155	566	136	.240	6	49
3B	Todd Zeile	144	506	138	.273	18	87
LF	Todd Hollandsworth	95	298	88	.295	11	48
CF	Juan Pierre	152	592	170	.287	1	35
RF	Larry Walker	136	477	161	.338	26	104

==== Other batters ====
Note: G = Games played; AB = At bats; H = Hits; Avg. = Batting average; HR = Home runs; RBI = Runs batted in

Player	G	AB	H	Avg.	HR	RBI
Terry Shumpert	106	234	55	.235	6	21
José Ortiz	65	192	48	.250	1	12
Jay Payton	47	170	57	.335	8	28
Greg Norton	113	168	37	.220	7	37
Gabe Kapler	40	119	37	.311	2	17
Benny Agbayani	48	117	24	.205	4	19
Sandy Alomar Jr.	38	116	31	.267	0	12
Bobby Estalella	38	112	23	.205	8	25
Mark Little	61	105	21	.200	0	5
Ben Petrick	38	95	20	.211	5	11
Jack Cust	35	65	11	.169	1	8
Jason Romano	18	37	12	.324	0	1
Ross Gload	26	31	8	.258	1	4
Walt McKeel	5	13	4	.308	0	0

=== Pitching ===
==== Starting pitchers ====
Note: G = Games pitched; IP = Innings pitched; W = Wins; L = Losses; ERA = Earned run average; SO = Strikeouts

Player	G	IP	W	L	ERA	SO
Jason Jennings	32	185.1	16	8	4.52	127
Mike Hampton	30	178.2	7	15	6.15	74
Denny Neagle	35	164.1	8	11	5.26	111
John Thomson	21	127.1	7	8	4.88	76
Shawn Chacón	21	119.1	5	11	5.73	67

==== Other pitchers ====
Note: G = Games pitched; IP = Innings pitched; W = Wins; L = Losses; ERA = Earned run average; SO = Strikeouts

Player	G	IP	W	L	ERA	SO
Denny Stark	32	128.1	11	4	4.00	64
Aaron Cook	9	35.2	2	1	4.54	14
Randy Flores	8	17.0	0	2	9.53	7
Cory Vance	2	4.0	0	0	6.75	1

==== Relief pitchers ====
Note: G = Games pitched; W = Wins; L = Losses; SV = Saves; ERA = Earned run average; SO = Strikeouts

Player	G	W	L	SV	ERA	SO
José Jiménez	74	2	10	41	3.56	47
Todd Jones	79	1	4	1	4.70	73
Justin Speier	63	5	1	1	4.33	47
Kent Mercker	58	3	1	0	6.14	37
Dennys Reyes	43	0	1	0	4.24	30
Rick White	41	2	6	0	6.20	27
Brian Fuentes	31	2	0	0	4.73	38
Chris Nichting	29	1	1	0	4.46	25
Víctor Santos	24	0	4	0	10.38	25
Mark Corey	14	0	0	0	12.00	12
Mike James	13	0	0	0	5.56	10
Sean Lowe	8	1	1	0	8.71	7
Todd Zeile	1	0	0	0	0.00	1

== Farm system ==
Level	Team	League	Manager
AAA	Colorado Springs Sky Sox	Pacific Coast League	Chris Cron
AA	Carolina Mudcats	Southern League	P. J. Carey
A	Salem Avalanche	Carolina League	Stu Cole
A	Asheville Tourists	South Atlantic League	Joe Mikulik
A-Short Season	Tri-City Dust Devils	Northwest League	Ron Gideon
Rookie	Casper Rockies	Pioneer League	Darron Cox

Records
Preceded by 2001	Colorado Rockies seasons 2002	Succeeded by 2003
