= 2002 Philadelphia Phillies season =

Major League Baseball season

2002 Philadelphia Phillies
- League: National League
- Division: East
- Ballpark: Veterans Stadium
- City: Philadelphia
- Record: 80–81 (.497)
- Divisional place: 3rd
- Owners: Bill Giles
- General managers: Ed Wade
- Managers: Larry Bowa
- Television: WPSG; CSN Philadelphia
- Radio: WPEN (Harry Kalas, Larry Andersen, Andy Musser, Chris Wheeler, Scott Graham, Tom McCarthy)

The 2002 Philadelphia Phillies season was the 120th season in the history of the franchise. The team failed to improve upon their 86–76 record from the previous season. However, this would be their last losing season until 2013.

On June 2, 2002, starting pitcher Robert Person hit two home runs, a grand slam and a 3-run home run in an 18–3 victory over the Montreal Expos.

== Offseason ==
- November 9, 2001: Omar Daal was traded by the Philadelphia Phillies to the Los Angeles Dodgers for Eric Junge and Jesus Cordero (minors).
- January 28, 2002: John Mabry was signed as a free agent with the Philadelphia Phillies.
- January 29, 2002: Ricky Ledée signed as a free agent with the Philadelphia Phillies.

== Regular season ==
=== Opening Day starters ===
- Jimmy Rollins – SS
- Doug Glanville – CF
- Bobby Abreu – RF
- Scott Rolen – 3B
- Mike Lieberthal – C
- Travis Lee – 1B
- Pat Burrell – LF
- Marlon Anderson – 2B
- Robert Person – SP

=== Season standings ===
==== National League East ====
NL East
Team	W	L	Pct.	GB	Home	Road
Atlanta Braves	101	59	.631	—	52‍–‍28	49‍–‍31
Montreal Expos	83	79	.512	19	49‍–‍32	34‍–‍47
Philadelphia Phillies	80	81	.497	21½	40‍–‍40	40‍–‍41
Florida Marlins	79	83	.488	23	46‍–‍35	33‍–‍48
New York Mets	75	86	.466	26½	38‍–‍43	37‍–‍43

==== Record vs. opponents ====
2002 National League record Source: MLB Standings Grid – 2002
Team	AZ	ATL	CHC	CIN	COL	FLA	HOU	LAD	MIL	MON	NYM	PHI	PIT	SD	SF	STL	AL
Arizona	—	3–3	4–2	6–0	14–5	5–1	3–3	9–10	4–2	4–2	5–2	4–3	4–2	12–7	8–11	2–4	11–7
Atlanta	3–3	—	4–2	4–2	4–3	11–8	3–3	2–4	5–1	13–6	12–7	11–7	3–3	3–3	3–3–1	5–1	15–3
Chicago	2–4	2–4	—	5–12	4–2	4–2	8–11	2–4	7–10	3–3	1–5	2–4	10–9	2–4	3–3	6–12	6–6
Cincinnati	0–6	2–4	12–5	—	3–3	5–1	6–11	4–2	13–6	1–5	2–4	2–4	11–7	5–1	2–4	8–11	2–10
Colorado	5–14	3–4	2–4	3–3	—	5–2	3–3	7–12	3–3	4–2	3–3	3–3	4–2	11–8	8–12	2–4	7–11
Florida	1–5	8–11	2–4	1–5	2–5	—	3–3	3–3	4–2	10–9	8–11	10–9	4–2	5–1	4–3	4–2	10–8
Houston	3–3	3–3	11–8	11–6	3–3	3–3	—	3–3	10–8	3–3	4–2	3–3	11–6	4–2	1–5	6–13	5–7
Los Angeles	10–9	4–2	4–2	2–4	12–7	3–3	3–3	—	5–1	5–2	4–2	4–3	4–2	10–9	8–11	2–4	12–6
Milwaukee	2–4	1–5	10–7	6–13	3–3	2–4	8–10	1–5	—	2–4	1–5	1–5	4–15	5–1	1–5	7–10	2–10
Montreal	2–4	6–13	3–3	5–1	2–4	9–10	3–3	2–5	4–2	—	11–8	11–8	3–3	3–4	4–2	3–3	12–6
New York	2–5	7–12	5–1	4–2	3–3	11–8	2–4	2–4	5–1	8–11	—	9–10	1–4	3–4	0–6	3–3	10–8
Philadelphia	3–4	7–11	4–2	4–2	3–3	9–10	3–3	3–4	5–1	8–11	10–9	—	2–4	2–4	3–3	4–2	10–8
Pittsburgh	2–4	3–3	9–10	7–11	2–4	2–4	6–11	2–4	15–4	3–3	4–1	4–2	—	2–4	2–4	6–11	3–9
San Diego	7–12	3–3	4–2	1–5	8–11	1–5	2–4	9–10	1–5	4–3	4–3	4–2	4–2	—	5–14	1–5	8–10
San Francisco	11–8	3–3–1	3–3	4–2	11–8	3–4	5–1	11–8	5–1	2–4	6–0	3–3	4–2	14–5	—	2–4	8–10
St. Louis	4–2	1–5	12–6	11–8	4–2	2–4	13–6	4–2	10–7	3–3	3–3	2–4	11–6	5–1	4–2	—	8–4

=== Notable transactions ===
- May 22, 2002: John Mabry was traded by the Philadelphia Phillies to the Oakland Athletics for Jeremy Giambi.
- May 26, 2002: Dan Plesac was traded by the Toronto Blue Jays to the Philadelphia Phillies for Cliff Politte.
- June 25, 2002: Bruce Aven was traded by the Cleveland Indians to the Philadelphia Phillies for Jeff D'Amico.
- July 29, 2002: Scott Rolen was traded by the Philadelphia Phillies with Doug Nickle and cash to the St. Louis Cardinals for Plácido Polanco, Mike Timlin, and Bud Smith.

==== Draft picks ====
- June 4, 2002: Cole Hamels was drafted by the Philadelphia Phillies in the 1st round (17th pick) of the 2002 amateur draft. Player signed August 28, 2002.

=== 2002 game log ===
Legend
	Phillies win
	Phillies loss
	Postponement
**Bold**	Phillies team member

2002 game log
Overall Record: 80–81
April (9–18)

#	Date	Opponent	Score	Win	Loss	Save	Attendance	Record
1	April 1	@ Braves	2–7	Tom Glavine (1–0)	**Robert Person** (0–1)	None	51,638	0–1
2	April 3	@ Braves	3–1	**Vicente Padilla** (1–0)	Kevin Millwood (0–1)	**José Mesa** (1)	23,865	1–1
3	April 4	@ Braves	2–11	Jason Marquis (1–0)	**Terry Adams** (0–1)	None	24,640	1–2
4	April 5	Marlins	6–2	**Brandon Duckworth** (1–0)	Julián Tavárez (0–1)	**José Mesa** (2)	50,958	2–2
5	April 6	Marlins	3–7	Vladimir Núñez (1–0)	**José Santiago** (0–1)	None	18,591	2–3
6	April 7	Marlins	3–2 (11)	**Cliff Politte** (1–0)	Braden Looper (0–2)	None	18,073	3–3
7	April 8	Braves	1–2	Kevin Millwood (1–1)	**Vicente Padilla** (1–1)	John Smoltz (1)	14,502	3–4
8	April 9	Braves	7–4	**José Santiago** (1–1)	Jason Marquis (1–1)	**José Mesa** (3)	13,020	4–4
9	April 10	Braves	7–5 (11)	**Cliff Politte** (2–0)	Kerry Ligtenberg (0–1)	None	14,542	5–4
10	April 11	Braves	2–6	Tom Glavine (2–0)	**David Coggin** (0–1)	Darren Holmes (1)	14,111	5–5
11	April 12	Reds	5–8	Jim Brower (1–0)	**Rhéal Cormier** (0–1)	Danny Graves (4)	13,366	5–6
12	April 13	Reds	2–5	Joey Hamilton (1–0)	**Robert Person** (0–2)	Danny Graves (5)	15,606	5–7
13	April 14	Reds	3–1	**Vicente Padilla** (2–1)	Elmer Dessens (0–3)	**José Mesa** (4)	19,195	6–7
14	April 16	@ Marlins	6–7	Gary Knotts (2–0)	**José Mesa** (0–1)	None	6,107	6–8
15	April 17	@ Marlins	7–5	**Rhéal Cormier** (1–1)	Braden Looper (0–3)	**José Mesa** (5)	6,478	7–8
16	April 18	@ Marlins	7–8	Vladimir Núñez (2–0)	**Ricky Bottalico** (0–1)	None	6,898	7–9
17	April 19	@ Pirates	4–7	Sean Lowe (1–0)	**Vicente Padilla** (2–2)	Mike Williams (7)	23,321	7–10
18	April 20	@ Pirates	5–6	Ron Villone (2–2)	**Terry Adams** (0–2)	Mike Williams (8)	18,032	7–11
19	April 21	@ Pirates	3–9	Kip Wells (3–1)	**Brandon Duckworth** (1–1)	None	18,749	7–12
20	April 23	Padres	8–5	**Randy Wolf** (1–0)	Matt DeWitt (0–1)	**José Mesa** (6)	12,138	8–12
21	April 24	Padres	2–7	Brian Lawrence (3–1)	**Robert Person** (0–3)	None	12,250	8–13
22	April 25	Padres	4–6	Bobby J. Jones (2–1)	**Rhéal Cormier** (1–2)	Trevor Hoffman (7)	12,249	8–14
23	April 26	@ Rockies	1–4	John Thomson (3–2)	**Terry Adams** (0–3)	José Jiménez (5)	37,551	8–15
24	April 27	@ Rockies	6–8	Shawn Chacón (2–3)	**Brandon Duckworth** (1–2)	José Jiménez (6)	38,064	8–16
25	April 28	@ Rockies	2–4	Jason Jennings (2–2)	**Randy Wolf** (1–1)	José Jiménez (7)	40,357	8–17
26	April 29	@ Giants	5–8	Tim Worrell (2–0)	**Rhéal Cormier** (1–3)	Robb Nen (7)	35,136	8–18
27	April 30	@ Giants	8–2	**Vicente Padilla** (3–2)	Liván Hernández (4–2)	None	34,918	9–18

May (12–14)

#	Date	Opponent	Score	Win	Loss	Save	Attendance	Record
28	May 1	@ Giants	1–2	Félix Rodríguez (1–2)	**Ricky Bottalico** (0–2)	Robb Nen (8)	36,304	9–19
29	May 3	Rockies	3–2	**Brandon Duckworth** (2–2)	Shawn Chacón (2–4)	**José Mesa** (7)	15,257	10–19
30	May 4	Rockies	6–5	**Héctor Mercado** (1–0)	Rick White (0–3)	**José Mesa** (8)	16,205	11–19
31	May 5	Rockies	7–4	**Vicente Padilla** (4–2)	Mike Hampton (1–4)	**José Mesa** (9)	32,411	12–19
32	May 7	Astros	7–4	**Carlos Silva** (1–0)	Hipólito Pichardo (0–1)	**José Mesa** (10)	12,321	13–19
33	May 8	Astros	5–3	**José Mesa** (1–1)	Nelson Cruz (0–3)	None	13,216	14–19
34	May 9	Astros	3–1	**Randy Wolf** (2–1)	Dave Mlicki (3–4)	**José Mesa** (11)	12,476	15–19
35	May 10	Diamondbacks	4–0	**Vicente Padilla** (5–2)	Rick Helling (3–4)	None	20,504	16–19
36	May 11	Diamondbacks	5–6 (10)	Byung-hyun Kim (1–0)	**José Mesa** (1–2)	None	32,634	16–20
37	May 12	Diamondbacks	3–1	**Terry Adams** (1–3)	Miguel Batista (2–2)	**José Mesa** (12)	21,114	17–20
38	May 13	@ Astros	3–17	Tim Redding (2–2)	**Brandon Duckworth** (2–3)	None	27,324	17–21
39	May 14	@ Astros	1–5	Octavio Dotel (1–1)	**Randy Wolf** (2–2)	Billy Wagner (5)	26,536	17–22
40	May 15	@ Astros	2–6	Carlos Hernández (4–1)	**Vicente Padilla** (5–3)	None	27,707	17–23
41	May 16	@ Diamondbacks	2–4	Randy Johnson (7–1)	**José Santiago** (1–2)	Byung-hyun Kim (11)	32,348	17–24
42	May 17	@ Diamondbacks	9–12	Eddie Oropesa (2–0)	**Rhéal Cormier** (1–4)	Byung-hyun Kim (12)	35,877	17–25
43	May 18	@ Diamondbacks	4–5	Mike Myers (3–1)	**José Mesa** (1–3)	None	47,357	17–26
44	May 19	@ Diamondbacks	4–3	**Randy Wolf** (3–2)	José Parra (0–1)	**José Mesa** (13)	43,704	18–26
45	May 21	Mets	4–0	**Vicente Padilla** (6–3)	Jeff D'Amico (3–4)	None	21,090	19–26
46	May 22	Mets	5–2	**Terry Adams** (2–3)	Al Leiter (5–3)	**José Mesa** (14)	22,640	20–26
47	May 23	Mets	0–1	Scott Strickland (3–2)	**José Mesa** (1–4)	Armando Benítez (9)	26,405	20–27
48	May 24	@ Expos	1–4	Tomo Ohka (4–3)	**Randy Wolf** (3–3)	Scott Stewart (1)	6,091	20–28
49	May 25	@ Expos	9–13 (10)	T. J. Tucker (3–0)	**Héctor Mercado** (1–1)	None	8,370	20–29
50	May 26	@ Expos	5–6	Graeme Lloyd (2–2)	**Vicente Padilla** (6–4)	Scott Stewart (2)	19,015	20–30
51	May 28	@ Mets	5–3	**Rhéal Cormier** (2–4)	Steve Trachsel (3–5)	**José Mesa** (15)	25,939	21–30
52	May 29	@ Mets	3–4	Scott Strickland (5–2)	**José Santiago** (1–3)	Armando Benítez (10)	37,417	21–31
53	May 31	Expos	7–8	Javier Vázquez (3–2)	**Brandon Duckworth** (2–4)	Scott Stewart (4)	15,455	21–32

June (15–11)

#	Date	Opponent	Score	Win	Loss	Save	Attendance	Record
54	June 1	Expos	8–4	**Vicente Padilla** (7–4)	Tony Armas Jr. (5–7)	None	16,601	22–32
55	June 2	Expos	18–3	**Robert Person** (1–3)	Britt Reames (0–2)	None	19,223	23–32
56	June 4	Marlins	0–5	Hansel Izquierdo (2–0)	**Terry Adams** (2–4)	None	14,942	23–33
57	June 5	Marlins	1–2	A. J. Burnett (6–5)	**Randy Wolf** (3–4)	None	13,039	23–34
–	June 6	Marlins	Postponed (rain); Makeup: September 10 as a traditional double-header					
58	June 7	@ Tigers	11–1	**Vicente Padilla** (8–4)	Jeff Weaver (4–8)	None	25,908	24–34
59	June 8	@ Tigers	2–1	**Robert Person** (2–3)	Danny Patterson (0–2)	**José Mesa** (16)	32,295	25–34
60	June 9	@ Tigers	7–5	**Brandon Duckworth** (3–4)	Steve Sparks (3–6)	**José Mesa** (17)	21,714	26–34
61	June 10	@ Indians	3–1	**Terry Adams** (3–4)	CC Sabathia (5–5)	**José Mesa** (18)	28,440	27–34
62	June 11	@ Indians	1–5	Bartolo Colón (8–4)	**Randy Wolf** (3–5)	Bob Wickman (14)	30,238	27–35
63	June 12	@ Indians	7–3	**Vicente Padilla** (9–4)	Chad Paronto (0–1)	None	35,783	28–35
64	June 14	Orioles	3–7	B. J. Ryan (1–0)	**Ricky Bottalico** (0–3)	None	16,888	28–36
65	June 15	Orioles	4–3 (10)	**Rhéal Cormier** (3–4)	Buddy Groom (2–2)	None	20,634	29–36
66	June 16	Orioles	2–4	Travis Driskill (4–0)	**Terry Adams** (3–5)	Jorge Julio (13)	41,079	29–37
67	June 18	White Sox	3–6 (12)	Antonio Osuna (4–1)	**David Coggin** (0–2)	Rocky Biddle (1)	17,424	29–38
68	June 19	White Sox	4–3	**Dan Plesac** (2–2)	Rocky Biddle (1–1)	None	21,905	30–38
69	June 20	White Sox	1–6	Mark Buehrle (10–5)	**Robert Person** (2–4)	None	22,132	30–39
70	June 21	Twins	3–0	**Brandon Duckworth** (4–4)	Kyle Lohse (6–5)	**José Mesa** (19)	17,039	31–39
71	June 22	Twins	1–4 (11)	LaTroy Hawkins (2–0)	**Dan Plesac** (2–3)	Eddie Guardado (21)	18,759	31–40
72	June 23	Twins	1–5	Tony Fiore (6–2)	**Randy Wolf** (3–6)	None	38,158	31–41
73	June 24	@ Marlins	15–4	**Vicente Padilla** (10–4)	Julián Tavárez (5–4)	None	5,465	32–41
74	June 25	@ Marlins	7–6 (11)	**José Mesa** (2–4)	Vic Darensbourg (1–2)	**Dan Plesac** (1)	5,355	33–41
75	June 26	@ Marlins	2–6	Michael Tejera (3–1)	**Brandon Duckworth** (4–5)	None	6,503	33–42
76	June 27	@ Marlins	7–3	**Terry Adams** (4–5)	Kevin Olsen (0–5)	None	6,079	34–42
77	June 28	@ Orioles	6–2	**Randy Wolf** (4–6)	Travis Driskill (5–1)	None	48,937	35–42
78	June 29	@ Orioles	1–11	Jason Johnson (3–5)	**Vicente Padilla** (10–5)	None	48,692	35–43
79	June 30	@ Orioles	8–5	**Robert Person** (3–4)	Rick Bauer (3–4)	**José Mesa** (20)	43,429	36–43

July (14–13)

#	Date	Opponent	Score	Win	Loss	Save	Attendance	Record
80	July 1	Mets	6–3	**Brandon Duckworth** (5–5)	Shawn Estes (3–6)	**José Mesa** (21)	18,422	37–43
81	July 2	Mets	6–12	Pedro Astacio (8–3)	**Terry Adams** (4–6)	None	20,826	37–44
82	July 3	Mets	8–7	**Dan Plesac** (3–3)	Scott Strickland (6–5)	**José Mesa** (22)	50,396	38–44
83	July 4	Expos	1–2	Joey Eischen (2–1)	**José Mesa** (2–5)	Scott Stewart (11)	12,303	38–45
84	July 5	Expos	3–8	Tomo Ohka (8–4)	**Robert Person** (3–5)	None	44,143	38–46
85	July 6	Expos	3–5	Javier Vázquez (6–5)	**Brandon Duckworth** (5–6)	Scott Stewart (12)	15,228	38–47
86	July 7	Expos	10–8	**Rhéal Cormier** (4–4)	Matt Herges (2–3)	**José Mesa** (23)	17,393	39–47
–	July 9	**2002 Major League Baseball All-Star Game at Miller Park in Milwaukee**						
87	July 11	@ Mets	1–9	Mark Guthrie (3–0)	**Rhéal Cormier** (4–5)	None	32,026	39–48
88	July 12	@ Mets	9–8	**Robert Person** (4–5)	Jeff D'Amico (4–8)	None	49,424	40–48
89	July 13	@ Mets	7–6 (12)	**Héctor Mercado** (2–1)	Scott Strickland (6–6)	**Carlos Silva** (1)	51,470	41–48
90	July 14	@ Mets	2–4	Pedro Astacio (9–3)	**Brandon Duckworth** (5–7)	Armando Benítez (21)	40,463	41–49
91	July 15	@ Expos	11–8	**David Coggin** (1–2)	Matt Herges (2–4)	**José Mesa** (24)	11,576	42–49
92	July 16	@ Expos	6–3	**Randy Wolf** (5–6)	Tony Armas Jr. (8–9)	**José Mesa** (25)	10,325	43–49
93	July 17	Cubs	4–3 (10)	**José Mesa** (3–5)	Jeff Fassero (3–6)	None	23,541	44–49
94	July 18	Cubs	4–6	Matt Clement (8–6)	**Vicente Padilla** (10–6)	None	27,672	44–50
95	July 19	Braves	1–4	Damian Moss (5–4)	**Brandon Duckworth** (5–8)	John Smoltz (35)	20,422	44–51
96	July 20	Braves	3–4	Jason Marquis (7–5)	**Terry Adams** (4–7)	John Smoltz (36)	23,570	44–52
97	July 21	Braves	1–2	Kevin Millwood (9–5)	**Randy Wolf** (5–7)	Tim Spooneybarger (1)	25,012	44–53
98	July 22	@ Cubs	6–7	Kyle Farnsworth (3–1)	**José Mesa** (3–6)	None	29,618	44–54
99	July 23	@ Cubs	7–4	**David Coggin** (2–2)	Matt Clement (8–7)	**José Mesa** (26)	32,770	45–54
100	July 24	@ Cubs	4–2	**Brett Myers** (1–0)	Mark Prior (4–3)	**José Mesa** (27)	32,697	46–54
101	July 25	@ Cubs	6–2	**Carlos Silva** (2–0)	Kyle Farnsworth (3–2)	None	34,565	47–54
102	July 26	@ Braves	3–2	**Randy Wolf** (6–7)	Kevin Millwood (9–6)	**José Mesa** (28)	44,744	48–54
103	July 27	@ Braves	3–5	Greg Maddux (10–3)	**Joe Roa** (0–1)	John Smoltz (38)	43,214	48–55
104	July 28	@ Braves	7–1	**Vicente Padilla** (11–6)	Tom Glavine (13–6)	None	31,764	49–55
105	July 30	Giants	3–10	Kirk Rueter (9–6)	**Brett Myers** (1–1)	None	27,330	49–56
106	July 31	Giants	8–6	**Mike Timlin** (2–3)	Troy Brohawn (0–1)	**José Mesa** (29)	22,595	50–56

August (18–10)

#	Date	Opponent	Score	Win	Loss	Save	Attendance	Record
107	August 1	Giants	2–1	**Randy Wolf** (7–7)	Russ Ortiz (7–8)	**José Mesa** (30)	20,380	51–56
108	August 2	Dodgers	3–1	**Carlos Silva** (3–0)	Paul Quantrill (2–4)	**José Mesa** (31)	17,076	52–56
109	August 3	Dodgers	6–8 (12)	Éric Gagné (1–0)	**David Coggin** (2–3)	Paul Quantrill (1)	23,506	52–57
110	August 4	Dodgers	3–4	Omar Daal (9–6)	**Brett Myers** (1–2)	Éric Gagné (36)	28,186	52–58
111	August 5	Dodgers	7–5	**Mike Timlin** (3–3)	Paul Shuey (3–1)	**José Mesa** (32)	20,259	53–58
112	August 6	@ Padres	5–4 (16)	**Rhéal Cormier** (5–5)	Bobby J. Jones (7–6)	None	17,519	54–58
113	August 7	@ Padres	2–5	Jake Peavy (3–4)	**Vicente Padilla** (11–7)	Trevor Hoffman (28)	18,583	54–59
114	August 8	@ Padres	4–7	Tom Davey (1–0)	**Terry Adams** (4–8)	None	22,076	54–60
115	August 9	@ Dodgers	6–7	Paul Shuey (4–1)	**Mike Timlin** (3–4)	Éric Gagné (38)	40,688	54–61
116	August 10	@ Dodgers	8–10	Paul Quantrill (3–4)	**Rhéal Cormier** (5–6)	Éric Gagné (39)	48,321	54–62
117	August 11	@ Dodgers	6–3	**Mike Timlin** (4–4)	Paul Shuey (4–2)	**José Mesa** (33)	38,517	55–62
118	August 13	Brewers	3–1	**Vicente Padilla** (12–7)	Glendon Rusch (6–12)	**José Mesa** (34)	14,046	56–62
119	August 14	Brewers	4–1	**Brett Myers** (2–2)	Jamey Wright (4–12)	None	14,509	57–62
120	August 15	Brewers	5–1	**Joe Roa** (1–1)	Rubén Quevedo (6–11)	None	14,288	58–62
121	August 16	Cardinals	4–0	**Randy Wolf** (8–7)	Chuck Finley (7–14)	None	31,117	59–62
122	August 17	Cardinals	1–5	Jason Simontacchi (9–4)	**David Coggin** (2–4)	None	20,242	59–63
123	August 18	Cardinals	1–5	Matt Morris (15–7)	**Vicente Padilla** (12–8)	None	58,493	59–64
124	August 20	@ Brewers	1–2	Jamey Wright (5–12)	**Brett Myers** (2–3)	Mike DeJean (20)	24,082	59–65
125	August 21	@ Brewers	13–3	**Joe Roa** (2–1)	Ben Sheets (7–15)	None	21,250	60–65
126	August 22	@ Brewers	7–0	**Randy Wolf** (9–7)	Jimmy Osting (0–1)	None	18,150	61–65
127	August 23	@ Cardinals	5–4 (14)	**Terry Adams** (5–8)	Kevin Joseph (0–1)	None	35,724	62–65
128	August 24	@ Cardinals	4–0	**Vicente Padilla** (13–8)	Andy Benes (3–4)	**José Mesa** (35)	41,033	63–65
129	August 25	@ Cardinals	5–3	**Carlos Silva** (4–0)	Jason Isringhausen (2–2)	**José Mesa** (36)	31,850	64–65
130	August 27	Expos	4–2	**Joe Roa** (3–1)	Masato Yoshii (4–6)	**José Mesa** (37)	16,126	65–65
131	August 28	Expos	3–6	Tomo Ohka (12–6)	**David Coggin** (2–5)	None	13,821	65–66
132	August 29	Expos	2–1	**Brandon Duckworth** (6–8)	Bartolo Colón (17–7)	**José Mesa** (38)	14,268	66–66
133	August 30	@ Mets	7–5	**Vicente Padilla** (14–8)	Pedro Astacio (11–8)	**José Mesa** (39)	30,976	67–66
134	August 31	@ Mets	1–0	**Randy Wolf** (10–7)	Steve Trachsel (8–10)	None	30,733	68–66

September (12–15)

#	Date	Opponent	Score	Win	Loss	Save	Attendance	Record
135	September 1	@ Mets	9–5	**Brett Myers** (3–3)	Al Leiter (11–11)	None	28,781	69–66
136	September 2	@ Expos	1–5	Tomo Ohka (13–6)	**Joe Roa** (3–2)	None	5,723	69–67
137	September 3	@ Expos	6–7 (10)	Joey Eischen (4–1)	**Terry Adams** (5–9)	None	5,723	69–68
138	September 4	@ Expos	5–8	Tony Armas Jr. (9–12)	**Vicente Padilla** (14–9)	Joey Eischen (2)	5,723	69–69
139	September 5	@ Expos	4–1	**Randy Wolf** (11–7)	Javier Vázquez (8–13)	None	2,134	70–69
140	September 6	Mets	2–7	Al Leiter (12–11)	**Brett Myers** (3–4)	None	16,335	70–70
141	September 7	Mets	4–5	Tyler Walker (1–0)	**Joe Roa** (3–3)	Armando Benítez (31)	21,747	70–71
142	September 8	Mets	3–11	John Thomson (9–11)	**Brandon Duckworth** (6–9)	None	20,047	70–72
143	September 9	Mets	4–6	Jeff D'Amico (6–10)	**Mike Timlin** (4–5)	Armando Benítez (32)	13,514	70–73
144	September 10 (1)	Marlins	4–6	Graeme Lloyd (4–4)	**Randy Wolf** (11–8)	Armando Almanza (2)	see 2nd game	70–74
145	September 10 (2)	Marlins	1–2	Justin Wayne (1–1)	**Vicente Padilla** (14–10)	Braden Looper (10)	14,345	70–75
146	September 11	Marlins	9–2	**Brett Myers** (4–4)	Brad Penny (6–6)	None	12,274	71–75
147	September 12	Marlins	6–1	**Joe Roa** (4–3)	Michael Tejera (8–8)	None	13,167	72–75
148	September 13	Pirates	3–5	Joe Beimel (2–5)	**Mike Timlin** (4–6)	Mike Williams (42)	13,718	72–76
149	September 14	Pirates	4–1	**Eric Junge** (1–0)	Brian Meadows (1–6)	**José Mesa** (40)	16,621	73–76
150	September 15	Pirates	1–0 (10)	**José Mesa** (4–6)	Scott Sauerbeck (3–3)	None	23,054	74–76
151	September 17	@ Braves	1–2	Greg Maddux (14–6)	**Vicente Padilla** (14–11)	John Smoltz (52)	23,082	74–77
152	September 18	@ Braves	6–5	**Carlos Silva** (5–0)	Kerry Ligtenberg (3–4)	**José Mesa** (41)	20,356	75–77
153	September 19	@ Braves	0–6	Tom Glavine (18–10)	**Joe Roa** (4–4)	None	23,482	75–78
–	September 20	@ Reds	Postponed (rain); Makeup: September 21 as a day-night double-header					
154	September 21 (1)	@ Reds	5–3 (10)	**Terry Adams** (6–9)	Scott Williamson (3–4)	**José Mesa** (42)	36,940	76–78
155	September 21 (2)	@ Reds	5–4 (11)	**Terry Adams** (7–9)	Joey Hamilton (4–10)	**José Mesa** (43)	40,804	77–78
156	September 22	@ Reds	4–3	**Brandon Duckworth** (7–9)	José Rijo (5–4)	**José Mesa** (44)	40,964	78–78
157	September 24	Braves	5–3	**Eric Junge** (2–0)	Tom Glavine (18–11)	**José Mesa** (45)	15,807	79–78
158	September 25	Braves	1–7	Damian Moss (12–6)	**Brett Myers** (4–5)	None	14,516	79–79
–	September 26	Braves	Cancelled (rain; Hurricane Isidore); Was not rescheduled					
159	September 27	@ Marlins	2–5	Gary Knotts (3–1)	**Randy Wolf** (11–9)	Braden Looper (13)	8,689	79–80
160	September 28	@ Marlins	9–3	**Brandon Duckworth** (8–9)	Justin Wayne (2–3)	None	11,746	80–80
161	September 29	@ Marlins	3–4 (10)	Braden Looper (2–5)	**Héctor Mercado** (2–2)	None	28,599	80–81

=== Roster ===
2002 Philadelphia Phillies
**Roster**
**Pitchers**: 51 Terry Adams; 27 Ricky Bottalico; 48 Dave Coggin; 37 Rhéal Cormier; 56 Brandon Duckworth; 28 Eric Junge; 54 Héctor Mercado; 49 José Mesa; 41 Brett Myers; 50 Doug Nickle; 44 Vicente Padilla; 31 Robert Person; 19 Dan Plesac; 35 Cliff Politte; 35 Joe Roa; 40 Jose Santiago; 52 Carlos Silva; 50 Mike Timlin; 43 Randy Wolf	**Catchers**: 39 Johnny Estrada; 24 Mike Lieberthal; 3 Todd Pratt; **Infielders**: 8 Marlon Anderson; 7 Jeremy Giambi; 15 Dave Hollins; 16 Travis Lee; 9 Tomás Pérez; 23 Plácido Polanco; 34 Nick Punto; 17 Scott Rolen; 11 Jimmy Rollins	**Outfielders**: 53 Bobby Abreu; 5 Pat Burrell; 29 Marlon Byrd; 6 Doug Glanville; 33 Ricky Ledée; 7 John Mabry; 22 Jason Michaels; 12 Eric Valent	**Manager**: 10 Larry Bowa; **Coaches**: 21 Greg Gross (hitting); 59 Ramon Henderson (bullpen); 46 Vern Ruhle (pitching); 30 Tony Scott (first base); 25 Gary Varsho (bench); 18 John Vukovich (third base)

== Player stats ==
=== Batting ===
==== Starters by position ====
Note: Pos = Position; G = Games played; AB = At bats; H = Hits; Avg. = Batting average; HR = Home runs; RBI = Runs batted in

Pos	Player	G	AB	H	Avg.	HR	RBI
C	Mike Lieberthal	130	476	133	.279	15	52
1B	Travis Lee	153	536	142	.265	13	70
2B	Marlon Anderson	145	539	139	.258	8	48
3B	Scott Rolen	100	375	52	.259	17	66
SS	Jimmy Rollins	154	637	156	.245	11	60
LF	Pat Burrell	157	586	165	.282	37	116
CF	Doug Glanville	138	422	105	.249	6	29
RF	Bobby Abreu	157	572	176	.308	20	85

==== Other batters ====
Note: G = Games played; AB = At bats; H = Hits; Avg. = Batting average; HR = Home runs; RBI = Runs batted in

Player	G	AB	H	Avg.	HR	RBI
Marlon Byrd	10	35	8	.229	1	1
Johnny Estrada	10	17	2	.118	0	2
Jeremy Giambi	82	156	38	.244	12	28
Dave Hollins	14	17	2	.118	0	0
Ricky Ledée	96	203	46	.227	8	23
John Mabry	21	21	6	.286	0	3
Jason Michaels	81	105	28	.267	2	11
Tomás Pérez	92	212	53	.250	5	20
Plácido Polanco	53	206	61	.296	4	22
Todd Pratt	39	106	33	.311	3	16
Nick Punto	9	6	1	.167	0	0
Eric Valent	7	10	2	.200	0	0

Note: Pitchers' hitting stats are not included above.

=== Pitching ===
==== Starting pitchers ====
Note: G = Games pitched; IP = Innings pitched; W = Wins; L = Losses; ERA = Earned run average; SO = Strikeouts

Player	G	IP	W	L	ERA	SO
Randy Wolf	31	210.2	11	9	3.20	172
Vicente Padilla	32	206.0	14	11	3.28	128
Brandon Duckworth	30	163.0	8	9	5.41	167
Robert Person	16	87.2	4	5	5.44	61
Brett Myers	12	72.0	4	5	4.25	34
Joe Roa	14	71.1	4	4	4.04	35

==== Other pitchers ====
Note: G = Games pitched; IP = Innings pitched; W = Wins; L = Losses; ERA = Earned run average; SO = Strikeouts

Player	G	IP	W	L	ERA	SO
Terry Adams	46	136.2	7	9	4.35	96
Dave Coggin	38	77.0	2	5	4.68	64
Eric Junge	4	12.2	2	0	1.42	11

==== Relief pitchers ====
Note: G = Games pitched; W = Wins; L = Losses; SV = Saves; ERA = Earned run average; SO = Strikeouts

Player	G	W	L	SV	ERA	SO
José Mesa	74	4	6	45	2.97	64
Carlos Silva	68	5	0	1	3.21	41
Rhéal Cormier	54	5	6	0	5.25	49
José Santiago	42	1	3	0	6.70	30
Dan Plesac	41	2	1	1	4.70	27
Héctor Mercado	31	2	2	0	4.62	40
Mike Timlin	30	3	3	0	3.79	15
Ricky Bottalico	30	0	3	0	4.61	24
Cliff Politte	13	2	0	0	3.86	15
Doug Nickle	4	0	0	0	6.23	2
Tomás Pérez	1	0	0	0	0.00	0

== Awards and honors ==
2002 Major League Baseball All-Star Game

- Jimmy Rollins, shortstop, starter
- Scott Rolen, third base, starter
- Vicente Padilla, pitcher, reserve

== Farm system ==
Level	Team	League	Manager
AAA	Scranton/Wilkes-Barre; Red Barons	International League	Marc Bombard
AA	Reading Phillies	Eastern League	Greg Legg
A	Clearwater Phillies	Florida State League	John Morris and Roly de Armas
A	Lakewood BlueClaws	South Atlantic League	Jeff Manto
A-Short Season	Batavia Muckdogs	New York–Penn League	Ronnie Ortegon
Rookie	GCL Phillies	Gulf Coast League	Rubén Amaro, Sr.

LEAGUE CHAMPIONS: GCL Phillies
