= List of Nippon Professional Baseball players (J) =

The following is a list of Nippon Professional Baseball players with the last name starting with J, retired or active.

== J ==
Name	Debut	Final Game	Position	Teams	Ref
Darrin Jackson					
Jason Jacome					
Kevin Jarvis					
Reggie Jefferson					
Doug Jennings					
Junichi Jinno					
Shinya Jinno					
Tomohiro Joh					
Tsuyoshi Johbe					
Kenji Johjima					
Jason Johnson					
Mark Johnson					
Mike Johnson					
Stan Johnson					
Masahiko Johzume					
Jimmy Jones					
Mitch Jones					
Eric Junge					
