= Juan Lopez (baseball coach, born 1952) =

Puerto Rican professional baseball coach (born 1952)

- Infielder / Coach
- Born: November 6, 1952 (age 73); Río Piedras, Puerto Rico
- Bats: Right Throws: Right
- Stats at Baseball Reference

Juan Lopez (born November 6, 1952) is a Puerto Rican former professional baseball infielder and coach. As a player, he was listed at 5 feet 10 inches (1.78 m) and 170 pounds (77 kg); he throws and bats right-handed. He was on the coaching staff of the New York Mets of Major League Baseball (MLB) during the 2002 and 2003 seasons.

== Career ==
Lopez played in Minor League Baseball from 1971 to 1984, within the farm systems of the Milwaukee Brewers and Detroit Tigers. After his playing career, he worked in coaching and related roles for multiple teams, mostly within the New York Mets organization:

- 1985 Roving instructor Detroit Tigers
- 1996 Hitting coach Pittsfield Mets
- 1997–1998, 2001 Hitting coach Capital City Bombers
- 1999–2000, 2006 Hitting coach Kingsport Mets
- 2002–2003 Batting practice coach, advance scout coordinator New York Mets
- 2004 Hitting coach Gulf Coast Mets
- 2005 Coach Brooklyn Cyclones
- 2008 Bullpen pitcher New York Mets
- 2009 Coach St. Lucie Mets
- 2009 Bench coach Kingsport Mets
- 2010 Coach Kingsport Mets
- 2011 Coach Lansing Lugnuts
- 2012 Coach GCL Blue Jays

== Personal life ==
Lopez is a cousin of Luis Isaac, who served on the coaching staff of the Cleveland Indians.
