= Mark Little (baseball) =

American baseball player (born 1972)

- Outfielder
- Born: July 11, 1972 (age 54); Edwardsville, Illinois, U.S.
- Batted: Right Threw: Right

MLB debut
- September 12, 1998, for the St. Louis Cardinals

Last MLB appearance
- July 20, 2004, for the Cleveland Indians

MLB statistics
- Batting average: .247
- Home runs: 3
- Runs batted in: 22
- Stats at Baseball Reference

Teams
- St. Louis Cardinals (1998); Colorado Rockies (2001–2002); New York Mets (2002); Arizona Diamondbacks (2002); Cleveland Indians (2004)

Mark Travis Little (born July 11, 1972) is an American former outfielder in Major League Baseball. Little retired after the 2006 season, after playing for the Florida Marlins Triple-A affiliate, the Albuquerque Isotopes. He batted and threw right-handed.

After playing for the University of Memphis in college, Little was drafted by the Texas Rangers in the 8th round of the 1994 amateur draft. Little played four years in the Rangers minor league system, getting as high as Triple-A, before being traded on August 9, 1998, along with Darren Oliver and Fernando Tatís to the St. Louis Cardinals for Royce Clayton and Todd Stottlemyre. Little was assigned to the Cardinals Triple-A affiliate, the Memphis Redbirds, before making his major league debut on September 12, 1998. In 2000, he led the Triple-A Memphis Redbirds with 22 stolen bases.

A free agent after the 2000 season, Little signed with the Colorado Rockies on November 7, 2000. 2002 saw Little get the most at bats in a single season of his entire career with 130; he did this playing for the Rockies, New York Mets, and Arizona Diamondbacks. He was acquired by the Mets along with John Thomson for Jay Payton, Mark Corey, and Robert Stratton. He was then dealt by the Mets to the Diamondbacks for P.J. Bevis. Little was released by the Diamondbacks on May 30, 2003, and signed with the Cleveland Indians on June 3, 2003. Little had his final 20 major league at bats playing for the Indians in 2004. He won the Governors' Cup with the Buffalo Bisons, the AAA affiliate of the Indians, in 2004. Released by Cleveland following the 2004 season, Little signed a minor league contract with the Florida Marlins on November 4, 2004. He played for the Marlins Triple-A affiliate, the Albuquerque Isotopes, during the 2005 and 2006 seasons, before retiring from Major League Baseball.
