= Satoru Komiyama =

Japanese baseball player

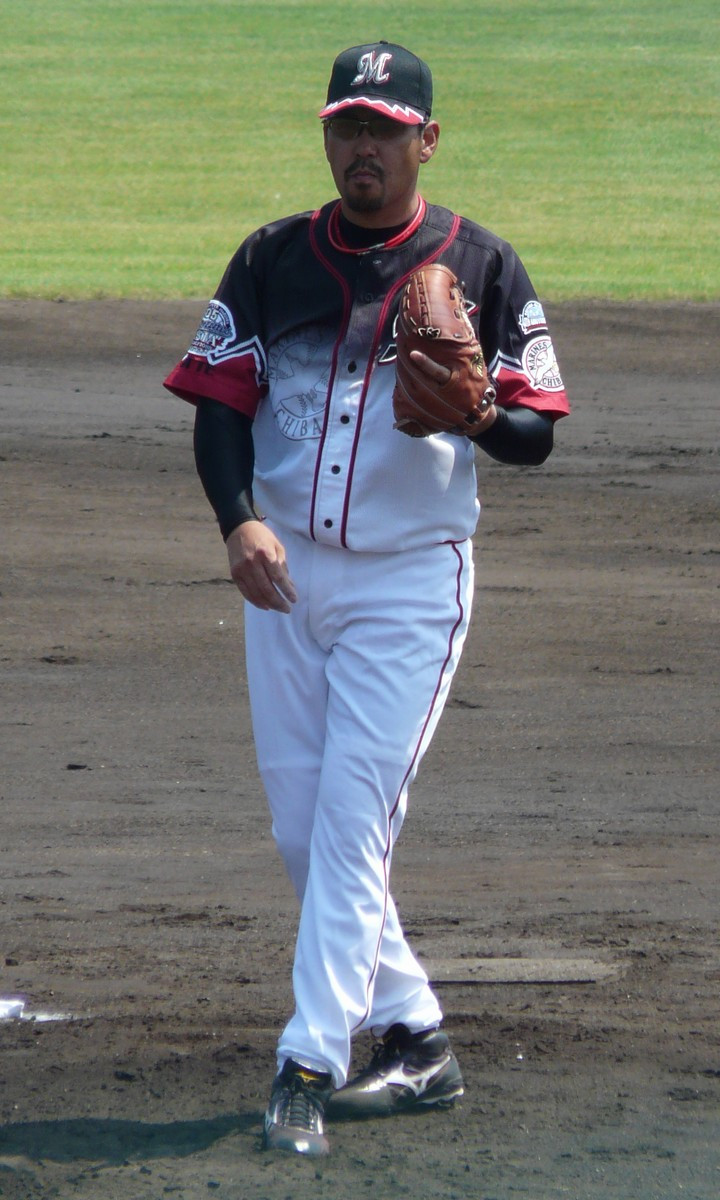
- Pitcher
- Born: September 15, 1965 (age 60); Kashiwa, Chiba, Japan
- Batted: Right Threw: Right

Professional debut
- NPB: 1990, for the Lotte Orions
- MLB: April 4, 2002, for the New York Mets

Last appearance
- MLB: September 11, 2002, for the New York Mets
- NPB: 2009, for the Chiba Lotte Marines

NPB statistics (through 2008 season)
- Win–loss record: 116-141
- Earned run average: 3.67
- Strikeouts: 1526

MLB statistics
- Win–loss record: 0-3
- Earned run average: 5.61
- Strikeouts: 33
- Stats at Baseball Reference

Teams
- Lotte Orions/Chiba Lotte Marines (1990–1999); Yokohama BayStars (2000–2001); New York Mets (2002); Chiba Lotte Marines (2004–2009)

Satoru Komiyama (小宮山 悟, Komiyama Satoru), born September 15, 1965, is a former professional baseball player from Kashiwa, Chiba, Japan. He last played with the Chiba Lotte Marines, and played in the major leagues with the New York Mets in 2002. He is currently the manager for the Waseda University baseball team.

== Biography ==
Komiyama was a star on the Waseda University college baseball team, and was drafted by the Lotte Orions (current Chiba Lotte Marines) in the first round in 1989. He won 6 games as a rookie in 1990, and won 10 games in 1992, becoming the team's ace. He would be the opening-day starter for three consecutive years after this. In 1997, he won only 11 games, but recorded a 2.49 ERA, the best in the league. The Marines cut Komiyama in 1999, and he signed with the Yokohama BayStars, playing two seasons where he posted ERA's under 4.00 as a starter. He became a free agent, and signed with the New York Mets in 2002, but returned to Japan after the season. He spent 2003 in semi-retirement, working as a baseball commentator while continuing his training. He returned to the Chiba Lotte Marines in 2004, but was mostly unable to repeat his performances from earlier in his career with the team. However, he still managed to contribute to the team's championship in 2005, mostly pitching in long relief. In 2007, he revealed that he would throw pitches under-handed (submarine) as well as his usual over-handed form.

Komiyama has appeared as a baseball commentator numerous times, even though he is still an active player. He was rumored to start the 2007 season doubling as a relief pitcher and a pitching coach, but he has announced that he will not coach until after he has retired.

== Pitching style ==
Komiyama has been known to experiment with various pitches during the off-season, and his most recent pitch, the "shakeball" (a variant of the knuckleball only reaching 50~60 mph, or 80~90 km/h) has been somewhat successful against batters. In his prime, he mostly relied on good control and outsmarting hitters. His fastball falls in the mid 80 mph range, but he has a large assortment of pitches, and has used a slider, curve, splitter, changeup, cutter, sinker, and shootball at various points in his career.
