= John Thomson (baseball) =

American baseball player (born 1973)

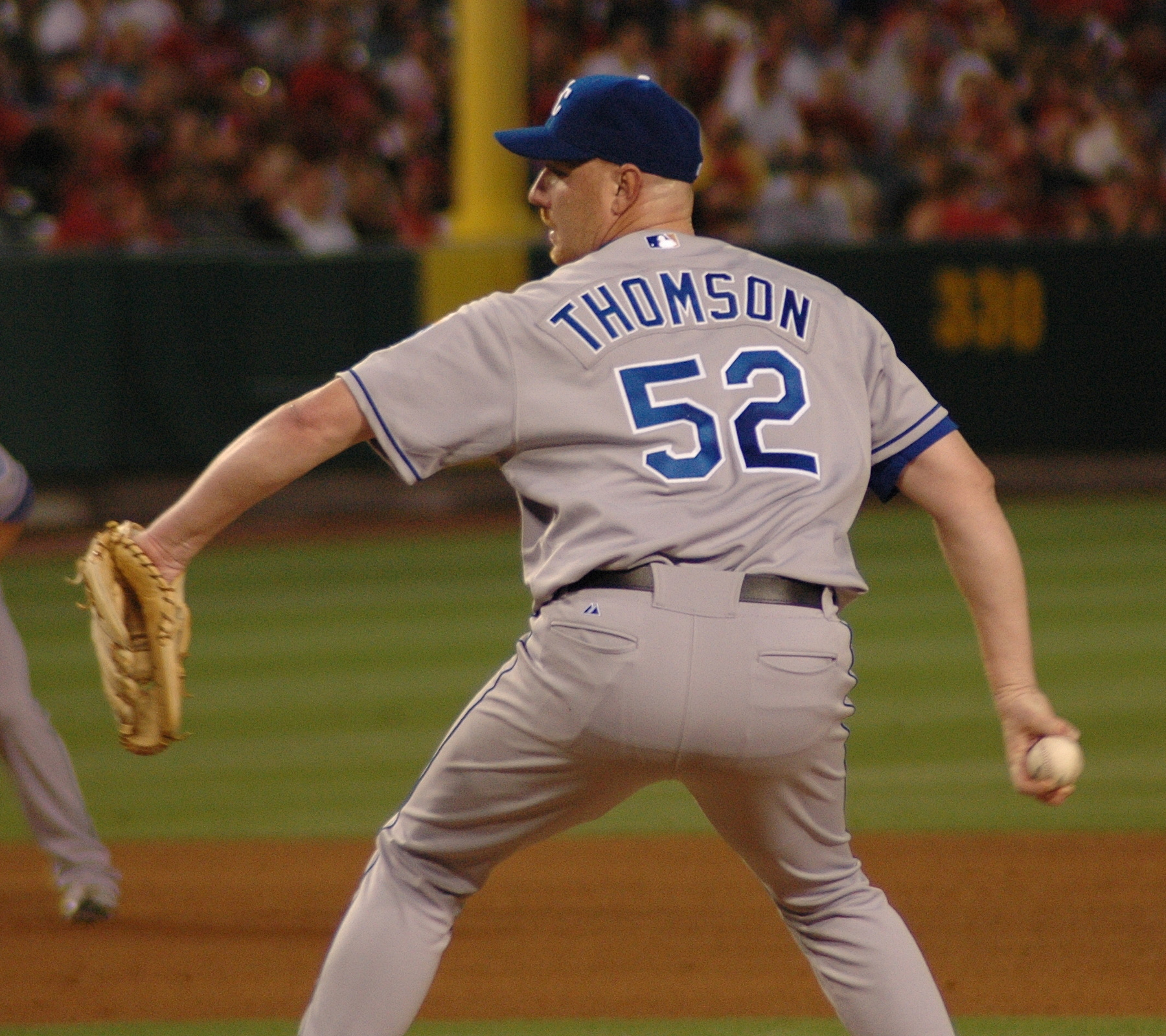
- Thomson with the Kansas City Royals
- Pitcher
- Born: October 1, 1973 (age 51); Vicksburg, Mississippi, U.S.
- Batted: Right Threw: Right

MLB debut
- May 11, 1997, for the Colorado Rockies

Last MLB appearance
- July 1, 2007, for the Kansas City Royals

MLB statistics
- Win–loss record: 63–85
- Earned run average: 4.68
- Strikeouts: 800
- Stats at Baseball Reference

Teams
- Colorado Rockies (1997–1999, 2001–2002); New York Mets (2002); Texas Rangers (2003); Atlanta Braves (2004–2006); Kansas City Royals (2007)

John Carl Thomson (born October 1, 1973) is an American former starting pitcher who last played for the Kansas City Royals of Major League Baseball. He is a 1991 graduate of Sulphur High School in Sulphur, Louisiana. He went undrafted out of high school and pitched for McNeese State University (Lake Charles, Louisiana) in 1992 and Blinn Junior College (Brenham, Texas) in 1993. The Colorado Rockies selected him in the seventh round of the June 1993 amateur draft and he made his major league debut for the Rockies on May 11, 1997. 2007 is his eleventh major league season. In addition to the Rockies, he has played for the New York Mets, Texas Rangers, Atlanta Braves and Kansas City Royals and also pitched in the Toronto Blue Jays organization from April through June 2007. He currently resides in his hometown of Sulphur, LA.

== Colorado Rockies ==
Thomson pitched in the Rockies minor league system for the Arizona Rockies of the Arizona Rookie League in 1993, the Asheville Tourists of the low single-A South Atlantic League (1994), the Central Valley Rockies of the advanced single-A California League (1994), the New Haven Ravens of the double-A Eastern League (1995–1996) and the Colorado Springs Sky Sox of the triple-A Pacific Coast League (1996–1997).

In his major league debut May 11, 1997, Thomson gave up three runs (only one earned) on five hits in 7 2/3 innings with 7 strikeouts and 4 walks in a 3–1 loss to the Philadelphia Phillies. He earned his first major league win in a complete game against the Florida Marlins June 1. He remained in the Rockies starting rotation for the rest of 1997, posting seven wins and nine losses with a 4.71 ERA and 106 strikeouts in 166 1/3 innings pitched.

Thomson made 26 starts for the Rockies in 1998 and led their starting pitchers with a 4.81 ERA. He missed a month of the season with a blister on his right middle finger that would become a recurring problem for him over the ensuing years.

The 1999 season was a poor one for Thomson. After six appearances (five starts), he was 0–5 with an 11.84 ERA and the Rockies sent him down to triple-A Colorado Springs where he didn't fare much better (0-2, 9.45 ERA in five starts). He returned to the Rockies August 14 and was credited with his first win since September 8, 1998, but failed to win another game the rest of the season. He finished 1999 at 1–10 with an 8.04 ERA. After the season, it was discovered that Thomson had a torn labrum (another injury that would recur later in his career). He had shoulder surgery October 12 and a second surgery the following day to repair his blister-prone right middle finger. With the exception of four rehabilitation appearances with the Rockies' Arizona Rookie League team and the Portland Rockies of the short-season, single-A Northwest League in August and September, he missed the entire 2000 season.

Thomson began 2001 on the disabled list (DL) as he continued rehabilitation of his surgically repaired shoulder. After five rehabilitation starts at Colorado Springs, he was activated May 12 and made three starts for Colorado before returning to the DL just two weeks later on May 26. This time, he made seven rehabilitation starts for the Sky Sox and returned to the Rockies August 2. He got his first win in more than two years August 19 against Florida. Over his final eight starts, he was 4–0 with a 3.36 ERA and for the season, he was 4–5 with a 4.05 ERA. On the final day of the season, he gave up Rickey Henderson's 3000th hit.

2002 would be Thomson's final season with the Rockies and he returned to his pre-injury form. In his first 11 starts for Colorado, he was 6–3 with a 3.86 ERA. With the Rockies unlikely to compete for a National League playoff spot and Thomson a free agent at the end of the season, he became a target of trade talks as the July 31 non-waiver deadline approached. After his final start for Colorado July 23, he was 7–8 with a 4.88 ERA in 21 starts.

== New York Mets ==
On July 31, 2002, the Rockies and Mets made a trade deadline deal that sent Thomson and outfielder Mark Little to New York for outfielder Jay Payton, relief pitcher Mark Corey and minor league outfielder Robert Stratton. He made nine starts for the Mets, going 2–6 with a 4.31 ERA. For the season, he was 9–14 with a 4.71 ERA in 30 starts.

== Texas Rangers ==
Thomson was granted free agency after the 2002 season and signed with the Texas Rangers January 3, 2003. He was 13–14 with the Rangers in 2003 with a 4.85 ERA in 35 starts and 217 innings pitched, leading the team in most statistical categories.

== Atlanta Braves ==
Thomson was again granted free agency in October 2003 and signed a two-year contract (including a club option for a third year) with the Atlanta Braves December 9. He had his best season as a major leaguer in 2004, posting a career-high 14 wins against only eight losses and a career-best 3.72 ERA. He carried this success over into 2005, going 3–2 with a 3.42 ERA over his first eight starts before a finger injury landed him on the DL May 17. He returned to the Braves August 13, but was unable to consistently regain his early season form and finished 2005 with a 4–6 record and a 4.47 ERA.

In spite of Thomson's injury troubles in 2005, the Braves exercised their option to bring him back for a third season in 2006. He struggled to a 2–6 record and a 4.68 ERA over his first 13 starts and went on the DL with a finger blister following his June 14 start against the Florida Marlins. He returned for two ineffective starts in July and was placed back on the DL—for the seventh time in his career—July 14 with shoulder stiffness. An MRI eventually revealed some fraying of his labrum and he made only one more appearance for the Braves, pitching an inning of relief September 27.

== Toronto Blue Jays ==
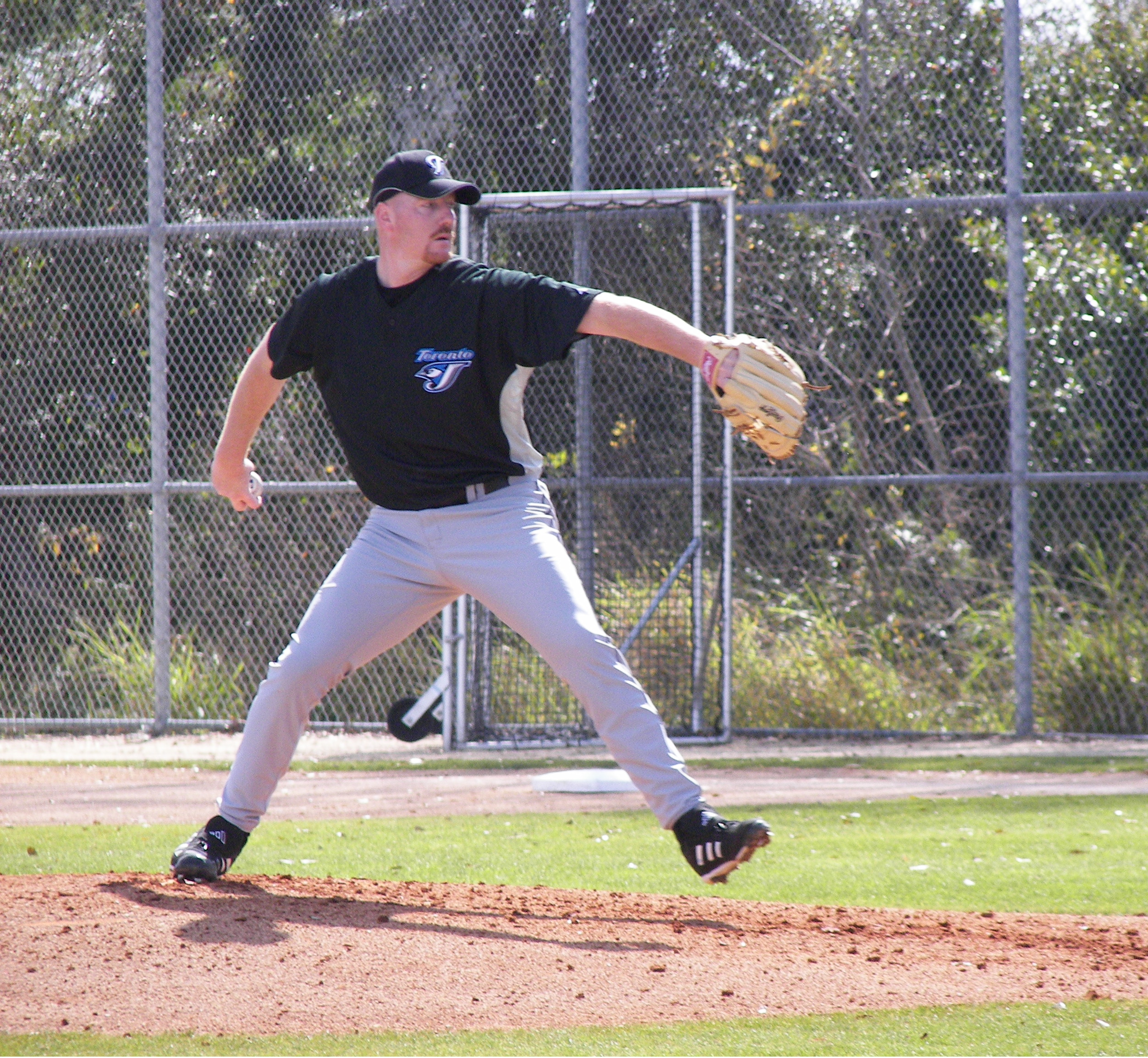
Thomson pitching for the Blue Jays in 2007 spring training.

On January 9, 2007, Thomson signed a one-year contract with the Toronto Blue Jays for a base pay of $500,000 plus up to $4,000,000 in bonuses based on the number of starts he made. The team placed him on the disabled list at the end of spring training with a recurrence of his shoulder injury and released him June 20 before he ever made an appearance with the major league club.

== Kansas City Royals ==
Thomson was signed by Kansas City on June 22, 2007, and replaced the injured Scott Elarton in the Royals' starting rotation. He filed for free agency on November 1, 2007.

== Major league and minor league statistics ==
	W	L	ERA	G	GS	IP	H	R	ER	HR	BB	SO	WHIP
Major Leagues	62	84	4.69	214	210	1,259 2/3	1,385	729	657	154	366	797	1.39
Minor Leagues	43	42	3.90	129	122	655 2/3	633	335	284	38	235	540	1.32

== Amateur Golf Career ==
On August 29, 2015, Thomson was declared champion of the 35th Annual AI Hesch golf tournament, played at the Wellshire Golf Course in Denver, Colorado.
