= Joe Roa =

American baseball player (born 1971)

- Pitcher
- Born: October 11, 1971 (age 54); Southfield, Michigan, U.S.
- Batted: Right Threw: Right

MLB debut
- September 20, 1995, for the Cleveland Indians

Last MLB appearance
- September 22, 2004, for the Minnesota Twins

MLB statistics
- Win–loss record: 9–16
- Earned run average: 4.94
- Strikeouts: 154
- Stats at Baseball Reference

Teams
- Cleveland Indians (1995–1996); San Francisco Giants (1997); Philadelphia Phillies (2002–2003); Colorado Rockies (2003); San Diego Padres (2003); Minnesota Twins (2004)

Joseph Rodger Roa (born October 11, 1971), nicknamed "the Roa Constrictor", is an American former Major League Baseball right-handed pitcher. Roa is a graduate of Hazel Park High School in Hazel Park, Michigan, and was drafted by the Atlanta Braves in the 18th round of the 1989 amateur draft. Roa was frequently called "the Roa Constrictor" by Twin Cities radio hosts.

== Minor league career ==
As a journeyman pitcher, Roa played in twelve Major League organizations during his career. In the minors, Roa played for the Atlanta Braves (1989–1991), New York Mets (1992–1994), Cleveland Indians (1994–1995, 2000), San Francisco Giants (1997–1998), Florida Marlins (2001), Philadelphia Phillies (2002), Milwaukee Brewers (2003), and Pittsburgh Pirates (2005).

From 1989 to 1995, Roa amassed a 67–35 record within the Braves, Mets, and Indians organizations. Roa continued to pitch well in the minors, garnering a 122–67 career record with a 3.49 ERA. His final minor league season came in 2005 with the Indianapolis Indians, an affiliate of the Pittsburgh Pirates. Roa appeared in 256 minor league games in his career.

== Major league career ==
In 1995, Joe Roa went 17–3 for the Cleveland Indians Triple-A affiliate, the Buffalo Bisons. His performance earned him a September call-up against the Chicago White Sox in 1995. Roa appeared in 28 games for the San Francisco Giants in 1997 after only appearing in two games since being drafted. Roa appeared in 120 major league games during his career. His best season came in 2004, when he appeared in 48 games for the Minnesota Twins, going 2–3 with a 4.50 ERA. He was released by the Pittsburgh Pirates during spring training on February 14, 2006.

== Personal life ==
Roa lives in the Detroit area with his wife Allison, and three children: sons Zack and Drake, and daughter Mackenzie. Roa was inducted into the Buffalo Baseball Hall of Fame in August 2018.
