= Eric Junge =

American baseball player & coach (born 1977)

- Pitcher
- Born: January 5, 1977 (age 49); Rye, New York
- Batted: Right Threw: Right

Professional debut
- MLB: September 11, 2002, for the Philadelphia Phillies
- NPB: April 15, 2008, for the Orix Buffaloes
- KBO: July 16, 2009, for the Hanwha Eagles
- CPBL: May 9, 2010, for the Sinon Bulls

Last appearance
- MLB: May 11, 2003, for the Philadelphia Phillies
- NPB: May 17, 2008, for the Orix Buffaloes
- KBO: September 20, 2009, for the Hanwha Eagles
- CPBL: May 22, 2010, for the Sinon Bulls

MLB statistics
- Win–loss record: 2–0
- Earned run average: 2.21
- Strikeouts: 16

NPB statistics
- Win–loss record: 0–1
- Earned run average: 6.97
- Strikeouts: 14

KBO statistics
- Win–loss record: 1–7
- Earned run average: 7.04
- Strikeouts: 56

CPBL statistics
- Win–loss record: 0–2
- Earned run average: 9.35
- Strikeouts: 5
- Stats at Baseball Reference

Teams
- Philadelphia Phillies (2002–2003); Orix Buffaloes (2008); Hanwha Eagles (2009); Sinon Bulls (2010)

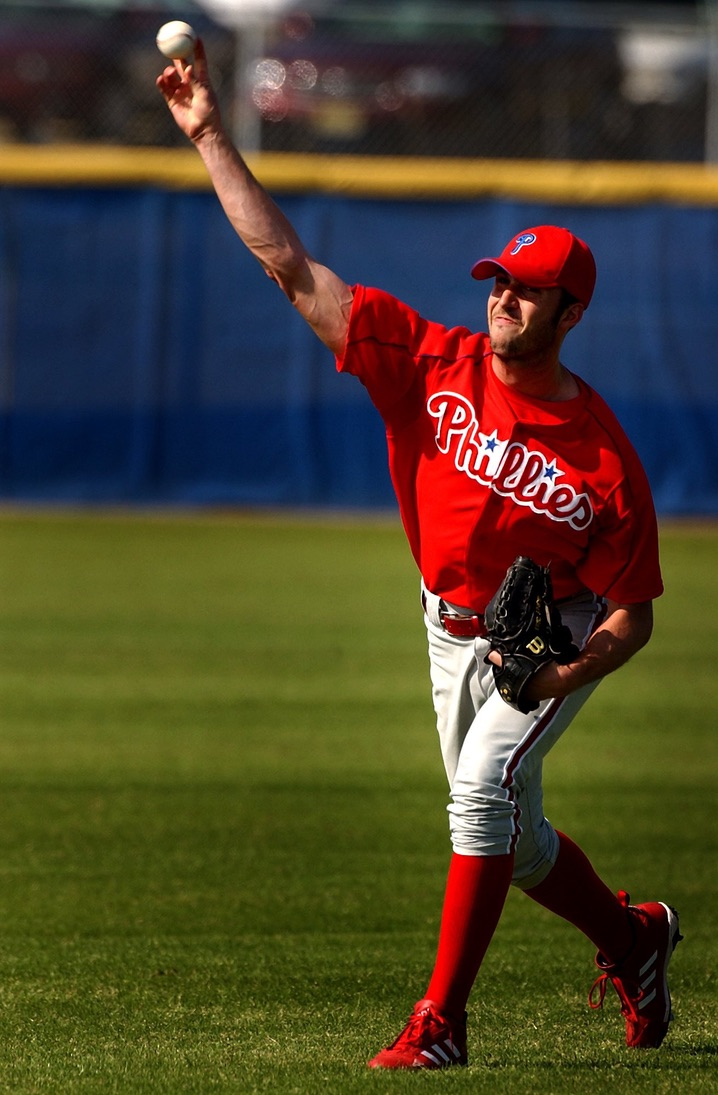
Eric Junge (Phillies, 2002)

Eric DeBari Junge (born January 5, 1977) is an American former professional baseball pitcher and current coach with the San Diego Padres. He played Major League Baseball (MLB) for the Philadelphia Phillies, and professionally in Japan (NPB), Korea (KBO), Venezuela Winter League (LVBP), Taiwan (CPBL) and MiLB for several organizations, accumulating 14 years/18 seasons of professional playing experience. Since retiring from play in January 2013, he has spent the subsequent 11 years in various roles with the San Diego Padres, including Advance Scout, Minor League Pitching Coordinator, Triple A Pitching Coach/Interim Manager, A Ball Manager and liaison to Player Development/Major League Rehab.

== Playing career ==
Junge graduated from Rye High School in Rye, New York and attended Bucknell University, graduating with a degree in business administration. Drafted by the Los Angeles Dodgers in the 11th round of the 1999 amateur draft he was traded to the Philadelphia Phillies in 2001. Appearing in 10 games for the Phillies in 2002/2003, he made his Major League debut on September 11, 2002. (See article) )His first win occurred September 14, against the Pittsburgh Pirates in Philadelphia's Veterans Stadium. His other career win came less than a week later against the Atlanta Braves, coming in a relief appearance lasting 4.2 innings. The losing pitcher that day was Tom Glavine. Junge owns a career record in the Major Leagues of 2-0, posting a 2.21 E.R.A. He has played in the minor league systems of the Los Angeles Dodgers, Philadelphia Phillies, New York Mets, San Diego Padres, New York Yankees, Los Angeles Angels of Anaheim, Atlanta Braves and Colorado Rockies, retiring with 100 career wins and 1700+ innings pitched in MiLB.

As a member of the Navegantes de Magallanes of the Venezuelan Winter League 2009-2013, Junge enjoyed particular on-field success. Helping guide his club to a league championship during the winter of 2012-2013, his individual accolades include winning the league E.R.A. title 2011-2012, posting a 1.59 mark with 56.2 IP.

== Coaching career ==
In January 2013, Junge retired as an active player and was hired as Advance Major League scout in the San Diego Padres front office and remained in that role for two seasons. Junge spent 2015-2017 as a Pitching Instructor and 2018-2020 as Pitching Coordinator in San Diego's Player Development department. 2021 he was named Triple A Pitching Coach and eventually interim manager midway through the season. In 2022, as manager of the Lake Elsinore Storm, A Ball affiliate of the Padres, Junge was named California League Manager of the Year as he led the Storm to a league championship, with a regular season record of 77-55 and a perfect 4-0 in the playoffs. Currently he works with various Major League & Minor League rehabbing players in an instructional capacity for the Padres, based out of San Diego.
