= Jason Middlebrook (baseball) =

American baseball player (born 1975)

- Pitcher
- Born: June 26, 1975 (age 51); Jackson, Michigan, U.S.
- Batted: Right Threw: Right

MLB debut
- September 17, 2001, for the San Diego Padres

Last MLB appearance
- May 15, 2003, for the New York Mets

MLB statistics
- Win–loss record: 4–4
- Earned run average: 5.33
- Strikeouts: 55
- Stats at Baseball Reference

Teams
- San Diego Padres (2001–2002); New York Mets (2002–2003)

Jason Douglas Middlebrook (born June 26, 1975) is an American former professional baseball pitcher. He played parts of three seasons in Major League Baseball, from 2001 to 2003, for the San Diego Padres and New York Mets.

On July 31, 2002, Middlebrook and Steve Reed were traded to the New York Mets in exchange for Jason Bay, Bobby Jones and Josh Reynolds.
