= Jeff D'Amico =

American baseball player (born 1975)

- Pitcher
- Born: December 27, 1975 (age 50); St. Petersburg, Florida, U.S.
- Batted: Right Threw: Right

MLB debut
- June 28, 1996, for the Milwaukee Brewers

Last MLB appearance
- May 10, 2004, for the Cleveland Indians

MLB statistics
- Win–loss record: 45–52
- Earned run average: 4.61
- Strikeouts: 498
- Stats at Baseball Reference

Teams
- Milwaukee Brewers (1996–2001); New York Mets (2002); Pittsburgh Pirates (2003); Cleveland Indians (2004)

Jeffrey Charles D'Amico (born December 27, 1975) is an American former professional baseball pitcher from 1996 to 2004. D'Amico, sometimes nicknamed "Big Daddy" due to his six-foot nine stature, was a starting pitcher who played for the Milwaukee Brewers, New York Mets, Pittsburgh Pirates, and Cleveland Indians of the Major League Baseball (MLB). His career record was 42 wins, 52 losses, 498 strikeouts and a 4.61 earned run average (ERA).

== Career ==
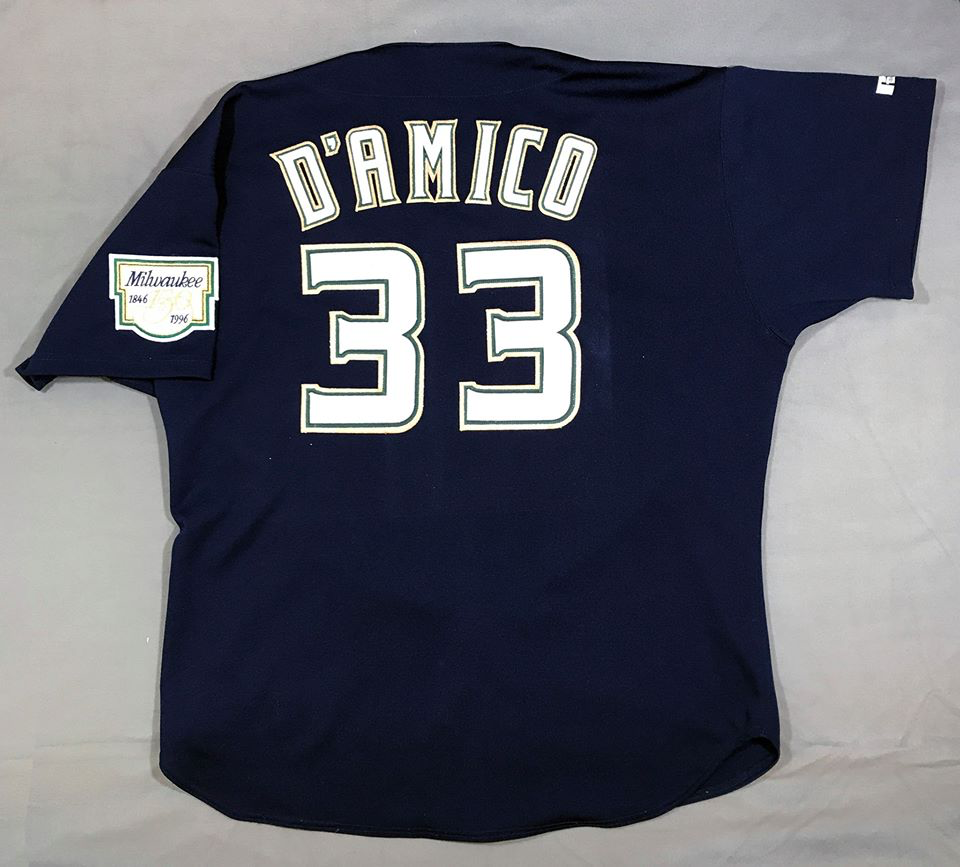
1996 Milwaukee Brewers #33 Jeff D'Amico Alternate Jersey

D'Amico was selected by the Milwaukee Brewers in the first round of the 1993 Major League Baseball draft. After three seasons in the minor leagues, he made his debut on June 28, 1996, and spent the next six years with the Brewers. After missing all of 1998 and most of 1999 due to shoulder surgery, D'Amico had a career year in 2000. That season, his ERA hovered around 2.00 for much of the season and he contended for the NL ERA title. Needing just a few innings to qualify for the title on his last start of the season, he surpassed the 162 innings minimum threshold, but in the process gave up enough runs to lose the title. D'Amico finished third, behind Kevin Brown and Randy Johnson.

On April 12, 2001, D'Amico hit the first triple at Miller Park after Houston's centerfielder Richard Hidalgo crashed into the wall trying to flag down the fly ball to center.

D'Amico was never able to follow his 2000 success as he struggled with injuries for the Brewers in 2001, before ending his career with appearances on the Mets, Pirates, and Cleveland. He led the National League in losses during the 2003 season with the Pirates and was released by the Indians in June 2004 after posting a 7.63 ERA in 7 starts.

Although a very weak hitter in his major league career, posting a .101 batting average (15-for-148) with 2 home runs and 5 RBI, he was a very good fielding pitcher. In 784 innings pitched over 139 games, he committed only one error in 116 total chances for a .991 fielding percentage.
