= Brandon Duckworth =

American baseball player and scout (born 1976)

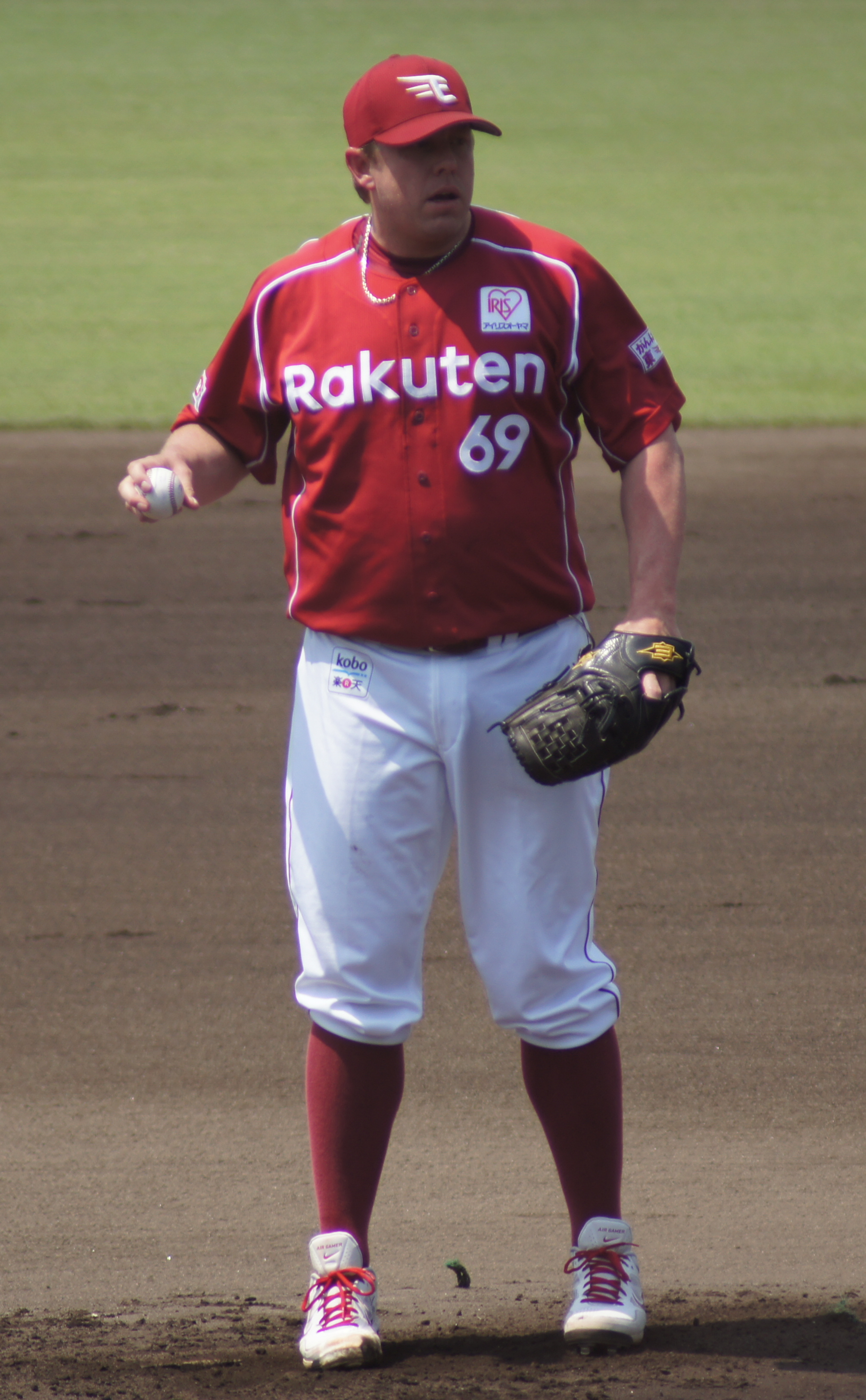
- Pitcher
- Born: January 23, 1976 (age 50); Kearns, Utah, U.S.
- Batted: Right Threw: Right

Professional debut
- MLB: August 7, 2001, for the Philadelphia Phillies
- NPB: August 25, 2012, for the Tohoku Rakuten Golden Eagles

Last appearance
- MLB: September 28, 2008, for the Kansas City Royals
- NPB: October 4, 2013, for the Tohoku Rakuten Golden Eagles

MLB statistics
- Win–loss record: 23–34
- Earned run average: 5.28
- Strikeouts: 376

NPB statistics
- Win–loss record: 8–6
- Earned run average: 4.35
- Strikeouts: 86
- Stats at Baseball Reference

Teams
- Philadelphia Phillies (2001–2003); Houston Astros (2004–2005); Kansas City Royals (2006–2008); Tohoku Rakuten Golden Eagles (2012–2013)

Career highlights and awards
- Japan Series champion (2013)

Brandon J. Duckworth (born January 23, 1976) is an American former professional baseball pitcher, who is currently a scout. He played in Major League Baseball (MLB) for the Philadelphia Phillies, Houston Astros, and Kansas City Royals, and in Nippon Professional Baseball (NPB) for the Tohoku Rakuten Golden Eagles. Since 2014, Duckworth has worked for the New York Yankees professional scouting department.

== Career ==
Duckworth graduated from Kearns High School in Kearns, Utah, in 1994. He attended the College of Southern Idaho and California State University, Fullerton. In 1997, he played collegiate summer baseball with the Brewster Whitecaps of the Cape Cod Baseball League.

On August 13, 1997, Duckworth signed with the Philadelphia Phillies as an amateur free agent. He made his MLB debut with the Phillies on August 7, 2001, in a home game versus the San Diego Padres, at Philadelphia's Veterans Stadium. From 2001 through 2003, Duckworth compiled a 15–18 win–loss record in 65 games (58 starts).

On November 3, 2003, the Phillies traded Duckworth, along with minor leaguers Taylor Buchholz and Ezequiel Astacio, to the Houston Astros for Billy Wagner. Duckworth spent the next two years in Houston, splitting his playing time between the majors and Triple-A.

Duckworth signed a minor league contract with the Pittsburgh Pirates on January 5, 2006. He began the season with the Triple-A Indianapolis Indians, going 8–3 with a 2.42 ERA in 12 starts.

On June 11, 2006, Duckworth was traded by Pittsburgh to the Kansas City Royals for cash considerations. He was immediately added to the Royals' starting rotation, and took the loss in his Royals debut on June 13 despite allowing just two earned runs in 5 2/3 innings. He finished the season with a 1–5 record and a 6.11 ERA in 10 games (eight starts). On April 28, 2007, Duckworth picked up the only save of his MLB career, going three innings of shutout baseball to close out a 8–3 victory over the Seattle Mariners. He held down the win for starter Gil Meche. Duckworth spent the majority of the season in the bullpen, going 3–5 with one save and a 4.63 ERA in 26 games (three starts).

Duckworth signed a one-year deal with the Royals to avoid arbitration on December 12, 2007. However, in January 2008, he was designated for assignment by the Royals to make room on the organizational roster for free agent signee Brett Tomko. Duckworth passed through waivers, and on February 1, the Royals announced that he had accepted an assignment to the Triple-A Omaha Royals. On August 24, 2008, Duckworth was recalled by Kansas City to start; in his first game, he went five innings while giving up three earned runs, and was credited with the win. Duckworth was 3–3 with a 4.50 ERA in seven starts to finish the 2008 season.

Duckworth spent the 2009 season with Triple-A Omaha, going 3–6 with a 5.31 ERA in 20 games (19 starts). In October 2009, Duckworth was granted free agency.

In January 2010, Duckworth signed a minor league contract to return to the Philadelphia Phillies organization.

On December 3, 2010, Duckworth signed a minor league contract with the Boston Red Sox. On July 25, 2012, the Red Sox granted him his release so he could play in Japan. Duckworth pitched for the Tohoku Rakuten Golden Eagles of Nippon Professional Baseball in 2012 and 2013.

After the 2013 season, Duckworth joined the New York Yankees as a scout. As of 2019, he remained in the employ of the Yankees professional scouting department.
