= Mark Corey =

American baseball player (born 1974)

- Pitcher
- Born: November 16, 1974 (age 52); Coudersport, Pennsylvania, U.S.
- Batted: Right Threw: Right

MLB debut
- October 2, 2001, for the New York Mets

Last MLB appearance
- October 1, 2004, for the Pittsburgh Pirates

MLB statistics
- Win–loss record: 2–7
- Earned run average: 6.02
- Strikeouts: 79
- Stats at Baseball Reference

Teams
- New York Mets (2001–2002); Colorado Rockies (2002); Pittsburgh Pirates (2003–2004)

Mark Franklin Corey (born November 16, 1974) is an American former baseball pitcher. He played in Major League Baseball (MLB) for the New York Mets, Colorado Rockies, and Pittsburgh Pirates.

== Early life ==
Corey attended Austin High School in Austin, Pennsylvania, where he played golf and basketball and threw javelin. He was the valedictorian of his class. As his graduating class had only 18 students, he relied on the American Legion to play baseball.

Corey played college baseball in NCAA Division II at Edinboro University of Pennsylvania for the Edinboro Fighting Scots. He was inducted into the school's athletics hall of fame in 2009.

== Professional career ==
Corey was drafted in the fourth round of the 1995 Major League Baseball draft by the Cincinnati Reds.

He made his Major League debut in 2001 with the New York Mets. In June 2002, Corey suffered a seizure after he and Mets teammate Tony Tarasco smoked marijuana outside of Shea Stadium. Under Major League Baseball drug policy at the time, because both players were first-time offenders, they were not subject to discipline from the league.

In 2004, with the Columbus Clippers, the New York Yankees' Triple-A affiliate, he went 7–4 with a 4.44 ERA. Corey led Triple-A with 28 saves in 2005. He pitched in the Pittsburgh Pirates organization for their Triple-A affiliate, the Indianapolis Indians, in 2007. At the time of his retirement, he had pitched in a combined 81 major league games for the Mets, Colorado Rockies, and Pirates.
