= 2002 Montreal Expos season =

2002 Montreal Expos
- League: National League
- Division: East
- Ballpark: Olympic Stadium
- City: Montreal
- Record: 83–79 (.512)
- Divisional place: 2nd
- Owners: Major League Baseball
- General managers: Omar Minaya
- Managers: Frank Robinson
- Television: Réseau des sports (Rodger Brulotte, Denis Casavant)
- Radio: CKGM (AM) (Terry Haig, Elliott Price) CKAC (AM) (Jacques Doucet, Marc Griffin)

The 2002 Montreal Expos season was the 34th season in franchise history, and their first winning season since 1996.

== Offseason ==
- October 3, 2001: The Expos sent Tim Raines to the Baltimore Orioles as part of a conditional deal.
- February 21, 2002: The Expos signed José Canseco as a free agent.
- March 7, 2002: The Expos signed Alan Mills as a free agent.
- March 24, 2002: The Expos traded Jason Bay and Jimmy Serrano to the New York Mets for Lou Collier.
- March 27, 2002: The Expos released José Canseco.
- March 28, 2002: The Expos signed Henry Rodriguez as a free agent.

== Spring training ==
In 2002, the Expos held spring training at Roger Dean Stadium in Jupiter, Florida – a facility they shared with the St. Louis Cardinals – for the fifth and final season. The following year, they moved to Space Coast Stadium in Viera, Florida, for spring training.

== Regular season ==
=== Opening Day lineup ===
Opening Day Starters
Name	Position
Peter Bergeron	Center fielder
José Vidro	Second baseman
Vladimir Guerrero	Right fielder
Orlando Cabrera	Shortstop
Lee Stevens	First baseman
Chris Truby	Third baseman
Brad Wilkerson	Left fielder
Michael Barrett	Catcher
Javier Vázquez	Starting pitcher

=== Season standings ===
==== National League East ====
NL East
Team	W	L	Pct.	GB	Home	Road
Atlanta Braves	101	59	.631	—	52‍–‍28	49‍–‍31
Montreal Expos	83	79	.512	19	49‍–‍32	34‍–‍47
Philadelphia Phillies	80	81	.497	21½	40‍–‍40	40‍–‍41
Florida Marlins	79	83	.488	23	46‍–‍35	33‍–‍48
New York Mets	75	86	.466	26½	38‍–‍43	37‍–‍43

==== Record vs. opponents ====
2002 National League record Source: MLB Standings Grid – 2002
Team	AZ	ATL	CHC	CIN	COL	FLA	HOU	LAD	MIL	MON	NYM	PHI	PIT	SD	SF	STL	AL
Arizona	—	3–3	4–2	6–0	14–5	5–1	3–3	9–10	4–2	4–2	5–2	4–3	4–2	12–7	8–11	2–4	11–7
Atlanta	3–3	—	4–2	4–2	4–3	11–8	3–3	2–4	5–1	13–6	12–7	11–7	3–3	3–3	3–3–1	5–1	15–3
Chicago	2–4	2–4	—	5–12	4–2	4–2	8–11	2–4	7–10	3–3	1–5	2–4	10–9	2–4	3–3	6–12	6–6
Cincinnati	0–6	2–4	12–5	—	3–3	5–1	6–11	4–2	13–6	1–5	2–4	2–4	11–7	5–1	2–4	8–11	2–10
Colorado	5–14	3–4	2–4	3–3	—	5–2	3–3	7–12	3–3	4–2	3–3	3–3	4–2	11–8	8–12	2–4	7–11
Florida	1–5	8–11	2–4	1–5	2–5	—	3–3	3–3	4–2	10–9	8–11	10–9	4–2	5–1	4–3	4–2	10–8
Houston	3–3	3–3	11–8	11–6	3–3	3–3	—	3–3	10–8	3–3	4–2	3–3	11–6	4–2	1–5	6–13	5–7
Los Angeles	10–9	4–2	4–2	2–4	12–7	3–3	3–3	—	5–1	5–2	4–2	4–3	4–2	10–9	8–11	2–4	12–6
Milwaukee	2–4	1–5	10–7	6–13	3–3	2–4	8–10	1–5	—	2–4	1–5	1–5	4–15	5–1	1–5	7–10	2–10
Montreal	2–4	6–13	3–3	5–1	2–4	9–10	3–3	2–5	4–2	—	11–8	11–8	3–3	3–4	4–2	3–3	12–6
New York	2–5	7–12	5–1	4–2	3–3	11–8	2–4	2–4	5–1	8–11	—	9–10	1–4	3–4	0–6	3–3	10–8
Philadelphia	3–4	7–11	4–2	4–2	3–3	9–10	3–3	3–4	5–1	8–11	10–9	—	2–4	2–4	3–3	4–2	10–8
Pittsburgh	2–4	3–3	9–10	7–11	2–4	2–4	6–11	2–4	15–4	3–3	4–1	4–2	—	2–4	2–4	6–11	3–9
San Diego	7–12	3–3	4–2	1–5	8–11	1–5	2–4	9–10	1–5	4–3	4–3	4–2	4–2	—	5–14	1–5	8–10
San Francisco	11–8	3–3–1	3–3	4–2	11–8	3–4	5–1	11–8	5–1	2–4	6–0	3–3	4–2	14–5	—	2–4	8–10
St. Louis	4–2	1–5	12–6	11–8	4–2	2–4	13–6	4–2	10–7	3–3	3–3	2–4	11–6	5–1	4–2	—	8–4

Expos vs. American League
Team	AL Central					
Team	CLE	CWS	DET	KC	MIN	TOR
**Montreal**	2–1	2–1	1–2	3–0	—	4–2

=== Notable transactions ===
- May 16, 2002: The Expos released Henry Rodriguez.
- June 27, 2002: The Expos traded Grady Sizemore, Cliff Lee, Brandon Phillips, and Lee Stevens to the Cleveland Indians for Bartolo Colón and Tim Drew.
- July 11, 2002: The Expos traded Graeme Lloyd, Mike Mordecai, Carl Pavano, Justin Wayne, and a player to be named later to the Florida Marlins for Cliff Floyd, Wilton Guerrero, Claudio Vargas, and cash. The Expos sent Donald Levinski (minors) to the Marlins on August 5, 2002, to complete the trade.
- July 19, 2002: The Expos released Sean Spencer.
- July 30, 2002: The Expos traded Cliff Floyd to the Boston Red Sox for Sun-Woo Kim and Seung Song (minors).

=== Roster ===
2002 Montreal Expos
**Roster**
**Pitchers**: 36 Tony Armas Jr.; 32 Jim Brower; 32 Bruce Chen; 40 Bartolo Colón; 54 Zach Day; 47 Tim Drew; 58 Joey Eischen; 49 Matt Herges; 31 Sun Woo Kim; 47 Graeme Lloyd; 24 Tomo Ohka; 45 Carl Pavano; 34 Britt Reames; 43 Dan Smith; 51 Scott Stewart; 25 Scott Strickland; 52 T. J. Tucker; 23 Javier Vázquez; 38 Ed Vosberg; 55 Masato Yoshii	**Catchers**: 5 Michael Barrett; 39 Brian Schneider; **Infielders**: 18 Orlando Cabrera; 2 Jamey Carroll; 22 Lou Collier; 14 Andrés Galarraga; 29 Henry Mateo; 12 Mike Mordecai; 9 Lee Stevens; 21 Fernando Tatís; 26 Chris Truby; 3 José Vidro	**Outfielders**: 11 Peter Bergeron; 29 Matt Cepicky; 19 Endy Chávez; 26 Wil Cordero; 30 Cliff Floyd; 27 Vladimir Guerrero; 4 Wilton Guerrero; 1 José Macías; 25 Troy O'Leary; 40 Henry Rodríguez; 6 Brad Wilkerson	**Manager**: 20 Frank Robinson; **Coaches**: 14 Manny Acta (Third base); 7 Wendell Kim (Bench); 17 Tommy McCraw (Hitting); 29 Jerry Morales (First base); 13 Bob Natal (Bullpen); 49 Dick Pole (Pitching); 16 Claude Raymond (Roving)

=== Game log ===
Legend
	Expos win
	Expos loss
	Postponement
**Bold**	Expos team member

2002 game log
April (16–10)

#	Date	Opponent	Score	Win	Loss	Save	Attendance	Stadium	Record
1	April 2	Marlins	7–6	**Herges** (1–0)	Looper (0–1)		34,351	Olympic Stadium	1–0
2	April 3	Marlins	5–6	Burnett (1–0)	**Armas** (0–1)	Tejera (1)	4,771	Olympic Stadium	1–1
3	April 4	Marlins	0–1	Penny (1–0)	**Pavano** (0–1)		4,551	Olympic Stadium	1–2
4	April 5	@ Reds	8–7	**Yoshii** (1–0)	Haynes (0–1)	**Lloyd** (1)	17,123	Cinergy Field	2–2
5	April 6	@ Reds	5–2	**Ohka** (1–0)	Pineda (0–1)	**Lloyd** (2)	18,176	Cinergy Field	3–2
6	April 7	@ Reds	5–6 (10)	Sullivan (1–0)	**Lloyd** (0–1)		17,549	Cinergy Field	3–3
7	April 8	@ Marlins	10–2	**Armas** (1–1)	Burnett (1–1)		23,877	Pro Player Stadium	4–3
8	April 10	@ Marlins	5–3	**Pavano** (1–1)	Penny (1–1)		5,422	Pro Player Stadium	5–3
9	April 11	@ Marlins	5–7	Tavárez (1–1)	**Yoshii** (1–1)	Núñez (1)	4,466	Pro Player Stadium	5–4
10	April 12	@ Mets	1–2	D'Amico (1–0)	**Ohka** (1–2)	Benítez (3)	32,624	Shea Stadium	5–5
11	April 13	@ Mets	9–8 (11)	**Herges** (2–0)	Strickland (0–1)		46,991	Shea Stadium	6–5
12	April 14	@ Mets	4–6	Trachsel (1–2)	**Armas** (1–2)	Benítez (4)	45,646	Shea Stadium	6–6
13	April 15	Cubs	4–6	Wood (2–0)	**Pavano** (1–2)	Alfonseca (2)	4,917	Olympic Stadium	6–7
14	April 16	Cubs	8–4	**Yoshii** (2–1)	Cruz (0–3)	**Tucker** (1)	4,486	Olympic Stadium	7–7
15	April 17	Cubs	15–8	**Chen** (1–0)	Osborne (0–1)		4,300	Olympic Stadium	8–7
16	April 18	Mets	0–1	Leiter (2–0)	**Vázquez** (0–1)		4,512	Olympic Stadium	8–8
17	April 19	Mets	5–3	**Armas** (2–2)	Trachsel (1–3)	**Herges** (1)	8,281	Olympic Stadium	9–8
18	April 20	Mets	7–5	**Pavano** (2–2)	Estes (0–2)	**Herges** (2)	11,464	Olympic Stadium	10–8
19	April 21	Mets	6–3	**Chen** (2–0)	Astacio (3–1)	**Lloyd** (3)	11,672	Olympic Stadium	11–8
20	April 23	Brewers	5–4	**Ohka** (2–1)	Sheets (1–3)	**Herges** (3)	3,561	Olympic Stadium	12–8
21	April 24	Brewers	5–4 (15)	**Tucker** (1–0)	Cabrera (1–3)		5,295	Olympic Stadium	13–8
22	April 25	Brewers	5–1	**Armas** (3–2)	Quevedo (1–2)	**Lloyd** (4)	3,501	Olympic Stadium	14–8
23	April 26	Cardinals	6–7 (11)	Stechschulte (2–0)	**Ohka** (2–2)	Veres (1)	8,545	Olympic Stadium	14–9
24	April 27	Cardinals	0–5	Matthews (1–0)	**Chen** (2–1)		6,288	Olympic Stadium	14–10
25	April 28	Cardinals	5–2	**Ohka** (3–2)	Morris (4–2)	**Herges** (4)	9,780	Olympic Stadium	15–10
26	April 30	@ Astros	5–1	**Vázquez** (1–1)	Oswalt (3–1)		28,178	Astros Field	16–10

May (11–17)

#	Date	Opponent	Score	Win	Loss	Save	Attendance	Stadium	Record
27	May 1	@ Astros	5–4	**Armas** (4–2)	Dotel (0–1)	**Herges** (5)	25,535	Astros Field	17–10
28	May 2	@ Astros	2–8	Redding (1–2)	**Pavano** (2–3)		25,788	Astros Field	17–11
29	May 3	@ Diamondbacks	3–6	Schilling (6–1)	**Chen** (2–4)	Kim (7)	31,315	Bank One Ballpark	17–12
30	May 4	@ Diamondbacks	5–6 (11)	Oropesa (1–0)	**Lloyd** (0–2)		40,427	Bank One Ballpark	17–13
31	May 5	@ Diamondbacks	2–5	Morgan (1–0)	**Vázquez** (1–2)	Kim (8)	37,027	Bank One Ballpark	17–14
32	May 7	Rockies	3–5	Thomson (5–2)	**Armas** (4–3)	Jiménez (8)	3,780	Olympic Stadium	17–15
33	May 8	Rockies	0–5	Chacón (3–4)	**Pavano** (2–4)		5,220	Olympic Stadium	17–16
34	May 9	Rockies	6–5 (12)	**Lloyd** (1–2)	White (0–4)		3,183	Olympic Stadium	18–16
35	May 10	Giants	6–3	**Vázquez** (2–2)	Hernández (4–3)		7,238	Olympic Stadium	19–16
36	May 11	Giants	2–3	Fultz (2–1)	**Reames** (0–1)	Nen (11)	29,778	Olympic Stadium	19–17
37	May 12	Giants	4–2	**Armas** (5–3)	Ortiz (3–2)	**Herges** (6)	5,528	Olympic Stadium	20–17
38	May 13	@ Padres	3–7	Tomko (3–2)	**Pavano** (2–5)		27,865	Qualcomm Stadium	20–18
39	May 14	@ Padres	4–5	Hoffman (1–0)	**Stewart** (0–1)		12,402	Qualcomm Stadium	20–19
40	May 15	@ Padres	1–2 (14)	Embree (3–1)	**Eischen** (0–1)		38,963	Qualcomm Stadium	20–20
41	May 16	@ Dodgers	3–4	Daal (4–0)	**Ohka** (3–3)	Gagné (13)	21,408	Dodger Stadium	20–21
42	May 17	@ Dodgers	5–8	Nomo (3–5)	**Armas** (5–4)	Gagné (14)	48,146	Dodger Stadium	20–22
43	May 18	@ Dodgers	3–1	**Pavano** (3–5)	Pérez (4–2)	**Tucker** (2)	42,881	Dodger Stadium	21–22
44	May 19	@ Dodgers	1–10	Ashby (3–4)	**Chen** (2–3)		31,816	Dodger Stadium	21–23
45	May 21	Braves	5–4 (10)	**Tucker** (2–0)	Holmes (2–1)		5,442	Olympic Stadium	22–23
46	May 22	Braves	0–2	Glavine (7–2)	**Armas** (5–5)		5,504	Olympic Stadium	22–24
47	May 24	Phillies	4–1	**Ohka** (4–3)	Wolf (3–3)	**Stewart** (1)	6,091	Olympic Stadium	23–24
48	May 25	Phillies	13–9 (10)	**Tucker** (3–0)	Mercado (1–1)		8,370	Olympic Stadium	24–24
49	May 26	Phillies	6–5	**Lloyd** (2–2)	Padilla (6–4)	**Stewart** (2)	19,015	Olympic Stadium	25–24
50	May 27	@ Braves	1–5	Glavine (8–2)	**Armas** (5–6)		30,187	Turner Field	25–25
51	May 28	@ Braves	2–5	Moss (2–1)	**Yoshii** (2–2)	Smoltz (14)	22,278	Turner Field	25–26
52	May 29	@ Braves	4–3	**Tucker** (4–0)	Smoltz (0–2)	**Stewart** (3)	20,162	Turner Field	26–26
53	May 30	@ Braves	2–5	Marquis (4–3)	**Pavanp** (3–6)		24,025	Turner Field	26–27
54	May 31	@ Phillies	8–7	**Vázquez** (3–2)	Duckworth (2–4)	**Stewart** (4)	15,455	Veterans Stadium	27–27

June (15–11)

#	Date	Opponent	Score	Win	Loss	Save	Attendance	Stadium	Record
55	June 1	@ Phillies	4–8	Padilla (7–4)	**Armas** (5–7)		16,601	Veterans Stadium	27–28
56	June 2	@ Phillies	3–18	Person (1–3)	**Reames** (0–2)		19,223	Veterans Stadium	27–29
57	June 3	Pirates	7–5	**Ohka** (5–3)	Wells (8–3)	**Stewart** (4)	4,821	Olympic Stadium	28–29
58	June 4	Pirates	2–5	Anderson (5–7)	**Pavano** (3–7)		4,619	Olympic Stadium	28–30
59	June 5	Pirates	3–1	**Vázquez** (4–2)	Fogg (6–4)		4,890	Olympic Stadium	29–30
60	June 7	@ White Sox	4–3	**Armas** (6–7)	Wright (5–7)	**Tucker** (3)	22,481	Comiskey Park	30–30
61	June 8	@ White Sox	2–1	**Stewart** (1–1)	Foulke (0–4)	**Tucker** (4)	24,783	Comiskey Park	31–30
62	June 9	@ White Sox	2–13	Buehrle (9–4)	**Pavano** (3–8)		21,870	Comiskey Park	31–31
63	June 10	@ Tigers	4–6	Bernero (2–2)	**Vázquez** (4–3)	Acevedo (8)	11,642	Comerica Park	31–32
64	June 11	@ Tigers	1–2	Redman (3–6)	**Herges** (2–1)	Acevedo (9)	14,100	Comerica Park	31–33
65	June 12	@ Tigers	2–1 (10)	**Stewart** (2–1)	Acevedo (1–2)	**Lloyd** (5)	16,837	Comerica Park	32–33
66	June 14	Blue Jays	8–2	**Ohka** (6–3)	Miller (4–3)		7,557	Olympic Stadium	33–33
67	June 15	Blue Jays	9–3	**Day** (1–0)	Loaiza (3–3)		12,474	Olympic Stadium	34–33
68	June 16	Blue Jays	6–5	**Stewart** (3–1)	Escobar (3–3)		15,425	Olympic Stadium	35–33
69	June 18	Royals	5–4	**Day** (2–0)	Mullen (0–1)	**Stewart** (6)	6,249	Olympic Stadium	36–33
70	June 19	Royals	6–3	**Ohka** (7–3)	Suzuki (0–2)	**Stewart** (7)	6,187	Olympic Stadium	37–33
71	June 20	Royals	5–4 (11)	**Eischen** (1–1)	Mullen (0–2)		5,773	Olympic Stadium	38–33
72	June 21	Indians	3–1	**Vázquez** (5–3)	Sabathia (5–6)	**Stewart** (8)	7,494	Olympic Stadium	39–33
73	June 22	Indians	4–5	Colón (10–4)	**Day** (2–1)	Wickman (17)	10,180	Olympic Stadium	39–34
74	June 23	Indians	7–2	**Armas** (7–7)	Finley (4–9)		13,557	Olympic Stadium	40–34
75	June 25	@ Pirates	1–4	Benson (1–4)	**Ohka** (7–4)	Williams (20)	17,543	PNC Park	40–35
76	June 26	@ Pirates	4–7	Wells (9–4)	**Vázquez** (5–4)	Williams (21)	36,966	PNC Park	40–36
77	June 27	@ Pirates	7–2 (7)	**Brower** (3–0)	Villone (2–6)		21,312	PNC Park	41–36
78	June 28	@ Blue Jays	2–1	**Armas** (8–7)	Halladay (9–4)	Williams (20)	20,848	SkyDome	42–36
79	June 29	@ Blue Jays	4–5 (10)	Escobar (4–4)	**Herges** (2–2)		24,344	SkyDome	42–37
80	June 30	@ Blue Jays	5–7	Eyre (2–3)	**Lloyd** (2–3)	Escobar (14)	24,965	SkyDome	42–38

July (11–16)

#	Date	Opponent	Score	Win	Loss	Save	Attendance	Stadium	Record
81	July 1	@ Braves	5–7	Ligtenberg (2–3)	**Vázquez** (5–5)	Smoltz (28)	26,053	Turner Field	42–39
82	July 2	@ Braves	5–2	**Colón** (11–4)	Moss (4–3)	**Stewart** (10)	25,581	Turner Field	43–39
83	July 3	@ Braves	5–6	Smoltz (1–2)	**Brower** (3–1)		23,439	Turner Field	43–40
84	July 4	@ Phillies	2–1	**Eischen** (2–1)	Mesa (2–5)	**Stewart** (11)	12,303	Veterans Stadium	44–40
85	July 5	@ Phillies	8–3	**Ohka** (8–4)	Person (3–5)		44,143	Veterans Stadium	45–40
86	July 6	@ Phillies	5–3	**Vázquez** (6–5)	Duckworth (5–6)	**Stewart** (12)	15,228	Veterans Stadium	46–40
87	July 7	@ Phillies	8–10	Cormier (4–4)	**Herges** (2–3)	Mesa (23)	17,393	Veterans Stadium	46–41
**All–Star Break (July 8–10)**
88	July 11	Braves	5–8	Millwood (7–5)	**Armas** (8–8)	Smoltz (32)	11,855	Olympic Stadium	46–42
89	July 12	Braves	3–8	Remlinger (7–0)	**Tucker** (4–1)		14,256	Olympic Stadium	46–43
90	July 13	Braves	6–3	**Colón** (12–4)	Glavine (11–5)		17,335	Olympic Stadium	47–43
91	July 14	Braves	10–3	**Vázquez** (7–5)	Moss (4–4)		25,109	Olympic Stadium	48–43
92	July 15	Phillies	8–11	Coggin (1–2)	**Herges** (2–4)	Mesa (24)	11,576	Olympic Stadium	48–44
93	July 16	Phillies	3–6	Wolf (5–6)	**Armas** (8–9)	Mesa (25)	10,325	Olympic Stadium	48–45
94	July 17	Mets	6–9	Guthrie (4–0)	**Stewart** (3–2)		13,402	Olympic Stadium	48–46
95	July 18	Mets	2–1	**Colón** (13–4)	Corey (0–2)		13,797	Olympic Stadium	49–46
96	July 19	@ Marlins	2–4	Tejera (6–2)	**Vázquez** (7–6)	Núñez (19)	6,941	Pro Player Stadium	49–47
97	July 20	@ Marlins	0–3	Penny (4–4)	**Yoshii** (2–3)	Looper (1)	8,883	Pro Player Stadium	49–48
98	July 21	@ Marlins	0–4	Beckett (3–4)	**Armas** (8–10)	Núñez (20)	8,320	Pro Player Stadium	49–49
99	July 22	@ Mets	2–5	Weathers (4–3)	**Ohka** (8–5)	Benítez (24)	23,655	Shea Stadium	49–50
100	July 23	@ Mets	3–4	D'Amico (5–8)	**Colón** (13–5)	Benítez (25)	36,289	Shea Stadium	49–51
101	July 24	@ Mets	2–1	**Vázquez** (8–6)	Estes (3–8)	**Stewart** (13)	28,526	Shea Stadium	50–51
102	July 25	Marlins	2–3	Núñez (5–3)	**Tucker** (4–2)		8,557	Shea Stadium	50–52
103	July 26	Marlins	6–5 (10)	**Tucker** (5–2)	Núñez (5–4)		9,406	Olympic Stadium	51–52
104	July 27	Marlins	2–7	Burnett (10–7)	**Ohka** (8–6)		19,373	Olympic Stadium	51–53
105	July 28	Marlins	4–1	**Colón** (14–5)	Tavárez (7–8)		16,770	Olympic Stadium	52–53
106	July 30	Diamondbacks	5–4 (10)	**Tucker** (6–2)	Kim (4–2)		11,068	Olympic Stadium	53–53
107	July 31	Diamondbacks	1–5	Johnson (15–4)	**Yoshii** (2–4)		11,747	Olympic Stadium	53–54

August (13–15)

#	Date	Opponent	Score	Win	Loss	Save	Attendance	Stadium	Record
108	August 1	Diamondbacks	2–1	**Eischen** (3–1)	Schilling (18–4)		10,873	Olympic Stadium	54–54
109	August 2	Astros	3–1	**Reames** (1–2)	Munro (2–1)	**Stewart** (14)	7,691	Olympic Stadium	55–54
110	August 3	Astros	3–5	Miller (9–3)	**Tucker** (6–3)	Wagner (22)	12,157	Olympic Stadium	55–55
111	August 4	Astros	4–5	Saarloos (4–2)	**Vázquez** (8–7)	Wagner (23)	20,027	Olympic Stadium	55–56
112	August 6	@ Cardinals	10–1	**Yoshii** (3–4)	Finley (6–13)		34,126	Busch Memorial Stadium	56–56
113	August 7	@ Cardinals	4–1	**Ohka** (9–6)	Simontacchi (7–4)	**Stewart** (15)	33,179	Busch Memorial Stadium	57–56
114	August 8	@ Cardinals	3–5	Morris (13–7)	**Reames** (1–3)	Isringhausen (25)	33,403	Busch Memorial Stadium	57–57
115	August 9	@ Brewers	11–4	**Colón** (15–5)	Quevedo (6–10)		25,919	Miller Park	58–57
116	August 10	@ Brewers	2–5	Cabrera (5–8)	**Vázquez** (8–8)	DeJean (19)	24,954	Miller Park	58–58
117	August 11	@ Brewers	2–6	Sheets (6–14)	**Yoshii** (3–5)		30,153	Miller Park	58–59
118	August 13	Dodgers	4–3	**Smith** (4–2)	Gagné (1–1)	**Stewart** (16)	13,263	Olympic Stadium	59–59
119	August 14	Dodgers	2–5	Ishii (13–7)	**Colón** (15–6)	Gagné (40)	13,416	Olympic Stadium	59–60
120	August 15	Dodgers	0–1	Daal (10–6)	**Vázquez** (8–9)	Gagné (41)	10,985	Olympic Stadium	59–61
121	August 16	Padres	11–6	**Day** (3–1)	Kershner (0–1)		7,564	Olympic Stadium	60–61
122	August 17	Padres	5–6	Johnson (1–0)	**Herges** (2–5)	Hoffman (32)	9,121	Olympic Stadium	60–62
123	August 18	Padres	9–2	**Ohka** (10–6)	Peavy (4–5)		24,872	Olympic Stadium	61–62
124	August 19	Padres	4–0	**Colón** (16–6)	Lawrence (11–7)		8,266	Olympic Stadium	62–62
125	August 20	@ Rockies	6–8	Neagle (7–7)	**Vázquez** (8–10)	Jiménez (34)	28,278	Coors Field	62–63
126	August 21	@ Rockies	13–5	**Yoshii** (4–5)	Chacón (5–11)		27,916	Coors Field	63–63
127	August 22	@ Rockies	6–14	Stark (9–3)	**Armas** (8–11)		27,231	Coors Field	63–64
128	August 23	@ Giants	7–2	**Ohka** (11–6)	Ortiz (8–10)	**Eischen** (1)	40,879	Pacific Bell Park	64–64
129	August 24	@ Giants	7–2	**Colón** (17–6)	Hernández (8–14)	**Stewart** (17)	41,165	Pacific Bell Park	65–64
130	August 25	@ Giants	4–8	Schmidt (9–6)	**Vázquez** (8–11)		41,408	Pacific Bell Park	65–65
131	August 27	@ Phillies	2–4	Roa (3–1)	**Yoshii** (4–6)	Mesa (37)	16,126	Veterans Stadium	65–66
132	August 28	@ Phillies	6–3	**Ohka** (12–6)	Coggin (2–5)		13,821	Veterans Stadium	66–66
133	August 29	@ Phillies	1–2	Duckworth (6–8)	**Colón** (17–7)	Mesa (38)	14,268	Veterans Stadium	66–67
134	August 30	Braves	2–4	Moss (9–5)	**Armas** (8–12)	Smoltz (47)	7,659	Olympic Stadium	66–68
135	August 31	Braves	3–5	Hammond (7–2)	**Vázquez** (8–12)	Smoltz (48)	8,528	Olympic Stadium	66–69

September (17–10)

#	Date	Opponent	Score	Win	Loss	Save	Attendance	Stadium	Record
136	September 1	Braves	4–6	Millwood (15–6)	**Yoshii** (4–7)	Smoltz (49)	10,581	Olympic Stadium	66–70
137	September 2	Phillies	5–1	**Ohka** (13–6)	Roa (3–2)		5,723	Olympic Stadium	67–70
138	September 3	Phillies	7–6 (10)	**Eischen** (4–1)	Adams (5–9)		3,879	Olympic Stadium	68–70
139	September 4	Phillies	8–5	**Armas** (9–12)	Padilla (14–9)	**Eischen** (2)	4,379	Olympic Stadium	69–70
140	September 5	Phillies	1–4	Wolf (11–7)	**Vázquez** (8–13)		2,134	Olympic Stadium	69–71
141	September 6	@ Braves	0–5	Millwood (16–6)	**Yoshii** (4–8)		24,361	Turner Field	69–72
142	September 7	@ Braves	0–4	Maddux (13–5)	Ohka (13–7)		34,424	Turner Field	69–73
143	September 8	@ Braves	7–0	**Colón** (18–7)	Glavine (16–10)		25,551	Turner Field	70–73
144	September 9	@ Cubs	2–3	Borowski (4–4)	**Brower** (3–2)		28,162	Wrigley Field	70–74
145	September 10	@ Cubs	6–2	**Vázquez** (9–13)	Zambrano (3–7)		29,587	Wrigley Field	71–74
146	September 11	@ Cubs	3–6	Benes (2–1)	**Yoshii** (4–9)	Alfonseca (18)	20,503	Wrigley Field	71–75
147	September 12	Mets	2–8	Middlebrook (2–3)	**Ohka** (13–8)		4,147	Olympic Stadium	71–76
148	September 13	Mets	11–8	**Colón** (19–7)	Thomson (9–12)	**Smith** (1)	7,219	Olympic Stadium	72–76
149	September 14	Mets	5–4	**Armas** (10–12)	Bacsik (3–2)	**Smith** (2)	17,278	Olympic Stadium	73–76
150	September 15	Mets	10–1	**Vázquez** (10–13)	Astacio (12–10)		16,608	Olympic Stadium	74–76
151	September 17	@ Marlins	8–5 (14)	**Stewart** (4–2)	Lloyd (4–5)		4,836	Pro Player Stadium	75–76
152	September 18	@ Marlins	4–2 (11)	**Eischen** (5–1)	Mairena (2–3)	**Drew** (1)	5,105	Pro Player Stadium	76–76
153	September 19	@ Marlins	6–5	**Colón** (20–7)	Knotts (2–1)	**Drew** (2)	5,148	Pro Player Stadium	77–76
154	September 20	@ Mets	6–1	**Armas** (11–12)	Thomson (9–13)		23,675	Shea Stadium	78–76
155	September 21	@ Mets	3–6 (11)	Benítez (1–0)	**Smith** (1–1)		30,946	Shea Stadium	78–77
156	September 22	@ Mets	5–1	**Day** (4–1)	Leiter (13–12)		36,730	Shea Stadium	79–77
157	September 24	Marlins	6–9	Pavano (6–10)	**Reames** (1–4)	Looper (12)	5,352	Olympic Stadium	79–78
158	September 25	Marlins	2–10	Beckett (6–7)	**Colón** (20–8)		7,416	Olympic Stadium	79–79
159	September 26	Marlins	4–3	**Armas** (12–12)	Penny (8–7)	**Day** (1)	5,869	Olympic Stadium	80–79
160	September 27	Reds	4–3 (11)	**Eischen** (6–1)	Riedling (2–4)		7,750	Olympic Stadium	81–79
161	September 28	Reds	6–0	**Kim** (3–0)	Moehler (3–5)		11,376	Olympic Stadium	82–79
162	September 29	Reds	7–2	**Drew** (1–0)	Haynes (15–10)		25,178	Olympic Stadium	83–79

=== Attendance ===
The Expos drew 812,045 fans during the 2002 season, and were 16th in attendance among the 16 National League teams. Their highest attendance for the season was for the Opening Day game on April 2 against the Florida Marlins, which drew 34,351 fans, while their lowest was for a game on September 5 against the Philadelphia Phillies, which drew only 2,134 fans.

== Player stats ==
=== Batting ===
Note: Pos = Position; G = Games played; AB = At bats; R = Runs scored; H = Hits; 2B = Doubles; 3B = Triples; HR = Home runs; RBI = Runs batted in; AVG = Batting average; SB = Stolen bases

Complete offensive statistics are available here.

Pos	Player	G	AB	R	H	2B	3B	HR	RBI	AVG	SB
C	Michael Barrett	117	376	41	99	20	1	12	49	.263	6
1B	Andrés Galarraga	104	292	30	76	12	0	9	40	.260	2
2B	José Vidro	152	604	103	190	43	3	19	96	.315	2
SS	Orlando Cabrera	153	563	64	148	43	1	7	56	.263	25
3B	Fernando Tatís	114	381	43	87	18	1	15	55	.228	2
LF	Troy O'Leary	97	273	27	78	12	2	3	37	.286	1
CF	Brad Wilkerson	153	507	92	135	27	8	20	59	.266	7
RF	Vladimir Guerrero	161	614	106	206	37	2	39	111	.336	40
UT	José Macías	90	231	33	59	17	1	7	33	.255	5
1B	Lee Stevens	63	205	28	39	6	1	10	31	.190	1
C	Brian Schneider	73	207	21	57	19	2	5	29	.275	1
LF	Wil Cordero	66	143	21	39	9	0	6	29	.273	2
LF	Peter Bergeron	31	123	24	23	3	2	0	7	.187	10
CF	Endy Chávez	36	125	20	37	8	5	1	9	.296	3
3B	Chris Truby	35	105	12	27	5	2	2	7	.257	1
IF	Mike Mordecai	55	74	9	15	4	0	0	4	.203	1
3B	Jamey Carroll	16	71	16	22	5	3	1	6	.310	1
LF	Matt Cepicky	32	74	7	16	3	0	3	15	.216	0
UT	Wilton Guerrero	44	62	3	12	1	0	0	1	.194	5
LF	Cliff Floyd	15	53	7	11	2	0	3	4	.208	1
OF	Henry Rodríguez	20	20	1	1	0	0	0	3	.050	0
MI	Henry Mateo	22	23	1	4	0	1	0	0	.174	2
OF	Lou Collier	13	11	3	1	1	0	0	52	.091	0
P	Javier Vázquez	33	73	7	13	0	0	0	4	.178	0
P	Tomo Ohka	30	55	3	7	1	0	0	2	.127	0
P	Tony Armas Jr.	26	50	1	5	0	1	0	2	.100	0
P	Masato Yoshii	29	35	2	2	1	0	0	0	.057	0
P	Bartolo Colón	17	39	1	5	0	0	0	3	.128	0
P	Carl Pavano	14	24	1	5	1	0	0	1	.208	0
P	Bruce Chen	14	12	3	5	1	0	0	1	.417	0
P	Britt Reames	40	9	0	1	0	0	0	1	.111	0
P	Zach Day	19	6	1	1	0	0	0	0	.167	0
P	Joey Eischen	56	8	1	1	1	0	0	0	.125	0
P	Sun-woo Kim	4	8	2	2	0	0	0	0	.250	0
P	Jim Brower	30	5	0	0	0	0	0	0	.000	0
P	Graeme Lloyd	37	4	0	0	0	0	0	0	.000	0
P	T. J. Tucker	53	4	1	3	0	0	0	0	.750	0
P	Tim Drew	7	4	0	0	0	0	0	0	.000	0
P	Dan Smith	32	3	0	0	0	0	0	0	.000	0
P	Matt Herges	58	1	0	0	0	0	0	0	.000	0
P	Scott Stewart	61	2	0	0	0	0	0	0	.000	0
P	Scott Strickland	1	0	0	0	0	0	0	0	–	0
P	Ed Vosberg	4	0	0	0	0	0	0	0	–	0
	Team totals	162	5479	735	1432	300	36	162	695	.261	118

=== Pitching ===
Note: Pos = Position; W = Wins; L = Losses; ERA = Earned run average; G = Games pitched; GS = Games started; SV = Saves; IP = Innings pitched; H = Hits allowed; R = Runs allowed; ER = Earned runs allowed; BB = Walks allowed; K = Strikeouts

Complete pitching statistics are available here.

Pos	Player	W	L	ERA	G	GS	SV	IP	H	R	ER	BB	K
SP	Javier Vázquez	10	13	3.91	34	34	0	230.1	243	111	100	49	179
SP	Tomo Ohka	13	8	3.18	32	31	0	192.2	194	83	68	45	118
SP	Tony Armas Jr.	12	12	4.44	29	29	0	164.1	149	87	81	78	131
SP	Masato Yoshii	4	9	4.11	31	20	0	131.1	143	66	60	32	74
SP	Bartolo Colón	10	4	3.31	17	17	0	117.0	115	48	43	39	74
SP	Carl Pavano	3	8	6.30	15	14	0	74.1	98	55	52	31	51
CL	Scott Stewart	4	2	3.09	67	0	17	64.0	49	29	22	22	67
RP	Britt Reames	1	4	5.03	42	6	0	68.0	70	42	38	38	76
RP	Matt Herges	2	5	4.04	62	0	6	64.2	80	33	29	26	50
RP	T. J. Tucker	6	3	4.11	57	0	4	61.1	69	32	28	31	42
RP	Joey Eischen	6	1	1.34	59	0	2	53.2	43	11	8	18	51
	Dan Smith	1	1	3.47	33	0	2	46.2	34	18	18	21	34
	Jim Brower	1	2	4.83	30	0	0	41.0	39	22	22	22	33
	Zach Day	4	1	3.62	19	2	1	37.1	28	18	15	15	25
	Bruce Chen	2	3	6.99	15	5	0	37.1	47	29	29	23	43
	Graeme Lloyd	2	3	5.87	41	0	5	30.2	41	21	20	8	17
	Sun-woo Kim	1	0	0.89	4	3	0	20.1	18	2	2	7	11
	Tim Drew	1	0	2.81	7	1	2	16.0	12	8	5	2	10
	Scott Strickland	0	0	0.00	1	0	0	1.0	0	0	0	0	2
	Ed Vosberg	0	0	18.00	4	0	0	1.0	3	3	2	1	0
	Team totals	83	79	3.97	162	162	39	1453.0	1475	718	641	508	1088

== Award winners ==
2002 Major League Baseball All-Star Game

- Jose Vidro, Second Base, Reserve
- Vladimir Guerrero, Outfield, Reserve

== Farm system ==
Level	Team	League	Manager
AAA	Ottawa Lynx	International League	Tim Leiper
AA	Harrisburg Senators	Eastern League	Dave Huppert
A	Brevard County Manatees	Florida State League	Bob Didier and Tony Torchia
A	Clinton LumberKings	Midwest League	Dave Machemer
A-Short Season	Vermont Expos	New York–Penn League	Dave Barnett
Rookie	GCL Expos	Gulf Coast League	Andy Skeels
