= 2002 Atlanta Braves season =

2002 Atlanta Braves
- National League East champions
- League: National League
- Division: East
- Ballpark: Turner Field
- City: Atlanta
- Record: 101–59 (.631)
- Divisional place: 1st
- Owners: AOL Time Warner
- General managers: John Schuerholz
- Managers: Bobby Cox
- Television: TBS Superstation; Turner South (Pete Van Wieren, Skip Caray, Don Sutton, Joe Simpson); Fox Sports South (Tom Paciorek, Bob Rathbun)
- Radio: WSB (AM) (Pete Van Wieren, Skip Caray, Don Sutton, Joe Simpson); WWWE (Marcelo Godoy, Jose Manuel Flores)

The 2002 Atlanta Braves season marked the franchise's 37th season in Atlanta and 132nd overall. The Braves won their eighth consecutive division title, finishing 19 games ahead of the second-place Montreal Expos. The Braves lost the 2002 Divisional Series to the eventual NL Champion San Francisco Giants, 3–2. This would be the first of four consecutive NLDS losses in as many years, and the first of three consecutive years to do so by losing the deciding Game 5 at Turner Field.

2002 marked the final year that pitchers Tom Glavine, Greg Maddux and John Smoltz played on the same team ending the reign of what has been considered by many the greatest pitching trio of all-time. All three would be inducted into the Baseball Hall of Fame a decade later. Smoltz set the Braves' single season record for saves (55). Chipper Jones moved to the outfield in left field to allow for Vinny Castilla to be signed and added to the lineup at third base. Julio Franco became a regular player in the second stint of his Major League career and Gary Sheffield was acquired to the Braves in 2002, playing at right field.

== Offseason ==
- October 26, 2001: Aaron Small was signed as a free agent with the Atlanta Braves.
- December 4, 2001: John Smoltz was re-signed from free agency back to the Atlanta Braves.
- December 11, 2001: Vinny Castilla signed as a free agent with the Atlanta Braves.
- December 17, 2001: Julio Franco was re-signed from free agency back to the Atlanta Braves.
- January 15, 2002: Gary Sheffield was traded by the Los Angeles Dodgers to the Atlanta Braves for Andrew Brown, Brian Jordan and Odalis Pérez.
- January 16, 2002: Doug Linton was signed as a free agent with the Atlanta Braves.
- March 20, 2002: Henry Blanco was traded by the Milwaukee Brewers to the Atlanta Braves for Paul Bako and Jose Cabrera.

== Regular season ==
=== Opening Day starters ===
- Vinny Castilla
- Rafael Furcal
- Marcus Giles
- Tom Glavine
- Andruw Jones
- Chipper Jones
- Javy López
- Gary Sheffield
- B. J. Surhoff

=== Season standings ===
==== National League East ====
NL East
| Team | W | L | Pct. | GB | Home | Road |
|---|---|---|---|---|---|---|
| Atlanta Braves | 101 | 59 | .631 | — | 52‍–‍28 | 49‍–‍31 |
| Montreal Expos | 83 | 79 | .512 | 19 | 49‍–‍32 | 34‍–‍47 |
| Philadelphia Phillies | 80 | 81 | .497 | 21½ | 40‍–‍40 | 40‍–‍41 |
| Florida Marlins | 79 | 83 | .488 | 23 | 46‍–‍35 | 33‍–‍48 |
| New York Mets | 75 | 86 | .466 | 26½ | 38‍–‍43 | 37‍–‍43 |

==== Record vs. opponents ====
2002 National League record Source: MLB Standings Grid – 2002
| Team | AZ | ATL | CHC | CIN | COL | FLA | HOU | LAD | MIL | MON | NYM | PHI | PIT | SD | SF | STL | AL |
|---|---|---|---|---|---|---|---|---|---|---|---|---|---|---|---|---|---|
| Arizona | — | 3–3 | 4–2 | 6–0 | 14–5 | 5–1 | 3–3 | 9–10 | 4–2 | 4–2 | 5–2 | 4–3 | 4–2 | 12–7 | 8–11 | 2–4 | 11–7 |
| Atlanta | 3–3 | — | 4–2 | 4–2 | 4–3 | 11–8 | 3–3 | 2–4 | 5–1 | 13–6 | 12–7 | 11–7 | 3–3 | 3–3 | 3–3–1 | 5–1 | 15–3 |
| Chicago | 2–4 | 2–4 | — | 5–12 | 4–2 | 4–2 | 8–11 | 2–4 | 7–10 | 3–3 | 1–5 | 2–4 | 10–9 | 2–4 | 3–3 | 6–12 | 6–6 |
| Cincinnati | 0–6 | 2–4 | 12–5 | — | 3–3 | 5–1 | 6–11 | 4–2 | 13–6 | 1–5 | 2–4 | 2–4 | 11–7 | 5–1 | 2–4 | 8–11 | 2–10 |
| Colorado | 5–14 | 3–4 | 2–4 | 3–3 | — | 5–2 | 3–3 | 7–12 | 3–3 | 4–2 | 3–3 | 3–3 | 4–2 | 11–8 | 8–12 | 2–4 | 7–11 |
| Florida | 1–5 | 8–11 | 2–4 | 1–5 | 2–5 | — | 3–3 | 3–3 | 4–2 | 10–9 | 8–11 | 10–9 | 4–2 | 5–1 | 4–3 | 4–2 | 10–8 |
| Houston | 3–3 | 3–3 | 11–8 | 11–6 | 3–3 | 3–3 | — | 3–3 | 10–8 | 3–3 | 4–2 | 3–3 | 11–6 | 4–2 | 1–5 | 6–13 | 5–7 |
| Los Angeles | 10–9 | 4–2 | 4–2 | 2–4 | 12–7 | 3–3 | 3–3 | — | 5–1 | 5–2 | 4–2 | 4–3 | 4–2 | 10–9 | 8–11 | 2–4 | 12–6 |
| Milwaukee | 2–4 | 1–5 | 10–7 | 6–13 | 3–3 | 2–4 | 8–10 | 1–5 | — | 2–4 | 1–5 | 1–5 | 4–15 | 5–1 | 1–5 | 7–10 | 2–10 |
| Montreal | 2–4 | 6–13 | 3–3 | 5–1 | 2–4 | 9–10 | 3–3 | 2–5 | 4–2 | — | 11–8 | 11–8 | 3–3 | 3–4 | 4–2 | 3–3 | 12–6 |
| New York | 2–5 | 7–12 | 5–1 | 4–2 | 3–3 | 11–8 | 2–4 | 2–4 | 5–1 | 8–11 | — | 9–10 | 1–4 | 3–4 | 0–6 | 3–3 | 10–8 |
| Philadelphia | 3–4 | 7–11 | 4–2 | 4–2 | 3–3 | 9–10 | 3–3 | 3–4 | 5–1 | 8–11 | 10–9 | — | 2–4 | 2–4 | 3–3 | 4–2 | 10–8 |
| Pittsburgh | 2–4 | 3–3 | 9–10 | 7–11 | 2–4 | 2–4 | 6–11 | 2–4 | 15–4 | 3–3 | 4–1 | 4–2 | — | 2–4 | 2–4 | 6–11 | 3–9 |
| San Diego | 7–12 | 3–3 | 4–2 | 1–5 | 8–11 | 1–5 | 2–4 | 9–10 | 1–5 | 4–3 | 4–3 | 4–2 | 4–2 | — | 5–14 | 1–5 | 8–10 |
| San Francisco | 11–8 | 3–3–1 | 3–3 | 4–2 | 11–8 | 3–4 | 5–1 | 11–8 | 5–1 | 2–4 | 6–0 | 3–3 | 4–2 | 14–5 | — | 2–4 | 8–10 |
| St. Louis | 4–2 | 1–5 | 12–6 | 11–8 | 4–2 | 2–4 | 13–6 | 4–2 | 10–7 | 3–3 | 3–3 | 2–4 | 11–6 | 5–1 | 4–2 | — | 8–4 |

=== Transactions ===
- June 4, 2002: Jeff Francoeur was drafted by the Atlanta Braves in the 1st round (23rd pick) of the 2002 amateur draft. Player signed July 8, 2002.
- September 30, 2002: Aaron Small was released by the Atlanta Braves.

=== Roster ===
2002 Atlanta Braves
**Roster**
| **Pitchers**: 30 Jung Bong; 33 Joey Dawley; 56 John Ennis; 48 John Foster; 47 Tom Glavine; 49 Kevin Gryboski; 36 Chris Hammond; 45 Trey Hodges; 40 Darren Holmes; 46 Kerry Ligtenberg; 32 Albie Lopez; 31 Greg Maddux; 38 Jason Marquis; 34 Kevin Millwood; 27 Damian Moss; 26 Andy Pratt; 37 Mike Remlinger; 30 Aaron Small; 29 John Smoltz; 43 Tim Spooneybarger | **Catchers**: 20 Henry Blanco; 8 Javy López; 50 Steve Torrealba; **Infielders**: 19 Vinny Castilla; 16 Mark DeRosa; 4,23 Julio Franco; 4 Matt Franco; 1 Rafael Furcal; 2 Jesse Garcia; 22 Marcus Giles; 18 Wes Helms; 7 Keith Lockhart; 15 B. J. Surhoff | **Outfielders**: 28 Darren Bragg; 25 Andruw Jones; 10 Chipper Jones; 72 Ryan Langerhans; 11 Gary Sheffield | **Manager**: 6 Bobby Cox; **Coaches**: 39 Pat Corrales (bench); 52 Bobby Dews (bullpen); 17 Glenn Hubbard (1st base); 54 Leo Mazzone (pitching); 9 Terry Pendleton (hitting); 5 Ned Yost (3rd base) |

=== Game log ===
2002 Game Log: 101–59 (Home: 52–28; Away: 49–31)
April: 12–15 (Home: 8–8; Away: 4–7)

| # | Date | Opponent | Score | Win | Loss | Save | Attendance | Record |
|---|---|---|---|---|---|---|---|---|
| 1 | April 1 | Phillies | 7–2 | **Glavine** (1–0) | Person (0–1) | — | 51,638 | 1–0 |
| 2 | April 3 | Phillies | 1–3 | Padilla (1–0) | **Millwood** (0–1) | Mesa (1) | 23,865 | 1–1 |
| 3 | April 4 | Phillies | 11–2 | **Marquis** (1–0) | Adams (0–1) | — | 24,640 | 2–1 |
| 4 | April 5 | Mets | 3–9 | Astacio (1–0) | **Lopez** (0–1) | — | 35,347 | 2–2 |
| 5 | April 6 | Mets | 2–11 | Weathers (1–0) | **Smoltz** (0–1) | — | 41,124 | 2–3 |
| 6 | April 7 | Mets | 5–2 (14) | **Lopez** (1–1) | Komiyama (0–1) | — | 34,210 | 3–3 |
| 7 | April 8 | @ Phillies | 2–1 | **Millwood** (1–1) | Padilla (1–1) | **Smoltz** (1) | 14,502 | 4–3 |
| 8 | April 9 | @ Phillies | 4–7 | Santiago (1–1) | **Marquis** (1–1) | Mesa (3) | 13,020 | 4–4 |
| 9 | April 10 | @ Phillies | 5–7 (11) | Politte (2–0) | **Ligtenberg** (0–1) | — | 14,542 | 4–5 |
| 10 | April 11 | @ Phillies | 6–2 | **Glavine** (2–0) | Coggin (0–1) | **Holmes** (1) | 14,111 | 5–5 |
| 11 | April 12 | @ Marlins | 2–0 | **Maddux** (1–0) | Beckett (0–1) | **Smoltz** (2) | 12,066 | 6–5 |
| 12 | April 13 | @ Marlins | 4–5 (14) | Knotts (1–0) | **Gryboski** (0–1) | — | 18,784 | 6–6 |
| 13 | April 14 | @ Marlins | 0–7 | Burnett (2–1) | **Marquis** (1–2) | — | 11,506 | 6–7 |
| 14 | April 15 | @ Mets | 6–7 (12) | Strickland (1–1) | **Hammond** (0–1) | — | 28,843 | 6–8 |
| 15 | April 16 | @ Mets | 1–3 | Astacio (3–0) | **Glavine** (2–1) | — | 31,472 | 6–9 |
| 16 | April 17 | @ Mets | 2–1 | **Millwood** (2–1) | D'Amico (1–1) | **Smoltz** (3) | 30,702 | 7–9 |
| 17 | April 19 | Marlins | 3–2 | **Holmes** (1–0) | Dempster (0–1) | **Smoltz** (4) | 27,256 | 8–9 |
| 18 | April 20 | Marlins | 3–1 | **Maddux** (2–0) | Burnett (2–2) | **Smoltz** (5) | 33,649 | 9–9 |
| 19 | April 21 | Marlins | 4–2 | **Glavine** (3–1) | Olsen (0–1) | **Smoltz** (6) | 27,425 | 10–9 |
| 20 | April 22 | Marlins | 3–8 | Penny (2–1) | **Millwood** (2–2) | — | 21,461 | 10–10 |
| 21 | April 23 | Diamondbacks | 2–5 | Schilling (4–1) | **Bong** (0–1) | Kim (3) | 30,674 | 10–11 |
| 22 | April 24 | Diamondbacks | 4–3 | **Foster** (1–0) | Prinz (0–1) | **Smoltz** (7) | 21,122 | 11–11 |
| 23 | April 25 | Diamondbacks | 5–11 | Helling (3–2) | **Maddux** (2–1) | — | 27,632 | 11–12 |
| 24 | April 26 | Astros | 9–0 | **Glavine** (4–1) | Redding (0–2) | — | 25,249 | 12–12 |
| 25 | April 27 | Astros | 3–6 | Mlicki (3–2) | **Millwood** (2–3) | Wagner (3) | 33,006 | 12–13 |
| 26 | April 28 | Astros | 1–7 | Hernandez (2–0) | **Lopez** (1–2) | — | 31,018 | 12–14 |
| 27 | April 30 | @ Brewers | 3–4 | Figueroa (1–1) | **Maddux** (2–2) | DeJean (5) | 16,067 | 12–15 |

May: 18–10 (Home: 8–5; Away: 10–5)

| # | Date | Opponent | Score | Win | Loss | Save | Attendance | Record |
|---|---|---|---|---|---|---|---|---|
| 28 | May 1 | @ Brewers | 3–1 | **Glavine** (5–1) | Quevedo (1–3) | **Smoltz** (8) | 17,084 | 13–15 |
| 29 | May 2 | @ Brewers | 3–2 (10) | **Holmes** (2–0) | DeJean (0–1) | **Smoltz** (9) | 18,113 | 14–15 |
| 30 | May 3 | @ Cardinals | 2–1 (11) | **Hammond** (1–1) | Stechschulte (2–1) | **Smoltz** (10) | 40,758 | 15–15 |
| 31 | May 4 | @ Cardinals | 2–3 | Simontacchi (1–0) | **Lopez** (1–3) | Isringhausen (5) | 42,455 | 15–16 |
| 32 | May 5 | @ Cardinals | 4–2 | **Maddux** (3–2) | Kile (1–2) | **Smoltz** (11) | 39,509 | 16–16 |
| 33 | May 7 | Dodgers | 5–6 (16) | Carrara (2–0) | **Ligtenberg** (0–2) | Orosco (1) | 26,914 | 16–17 |
| 34 | May 8 | Dodgers | 1–3 | Perez (4–1) | **Millwood** (2–4) | Gagne (11) | 22,163 | 16–18 |
| 35 | May 9 | Dodgers | 6–2 | **Moss** (1–0) | Ashby (2–3) | — | 23,930 | 17–18 |
| 36 | May 10 | Padres | 7–3 | **Remlinger** (1–0) | Fikac (3–2) | — | 29,075 | 18–18 |
| 37 | May 11 | Padres | 6–1 | **Marquis** (2–2) | Lawrence (4–2) | — | 36,273 | 19–18 |
| 38 | May 12 | Padres | 5–6 | Boyd (1–0) | **Glavine** (5–2) | Hoffman (12) | 25,636 | 19–19 |
| 39 | May 13 | @ Giants | 6–7 (11) | Worrell (3–0) | **Hammond** (1–2) | — | 36,331 | 19–20 |
| 40 | May 14 | @ Giants | 0–2 | Jensen (4–2) | **Moss** (1–1) | Nen (12) | 36,972 | 19–21 |
| 41 | May 15 | @ Giants | 6–1 | **Maddux** (4–2) | Hernandez (4–4) | — | 38,164 | 20–21 |
| 42 | May 16 | @ Giants | 5–4 | **Marquis** (3–2) | Schmidt (0–1) | — | 40,236 | 21–21 |
| 43 | May 17 | @ Rockies | 4–2 | **Glavine** (6–2) | Thomson (5–3) | **Smoltz** (12) | 40,357 | 22–21 |
| 44 | May 18 | @ Rockies | 3–7 | Stark (2–0) | **Millwood** (2–5) | — | 42,780 | 22–22 |
| 45 | May 19 | @ Rockies | 2–1 | **Remlinger** (2–0) | Nichting (0–1) | **Smoltz** (13) | 43,151 | 23–22 |
| 46 | May 21 | @ Expos | 4–5 (10) | Tucker (2–0) | **Holmes** (2–1) | — | 5,442 | 23–23 |
| 47 | May 22 | @ Expos | 2–0 | **Glavine** (7–2) | Armas (5–5) | — | 5,504 | 24–23 |
| 48 | May 24 | Reds | 11–2 | **Millwood** (3–5) | Hamilton (2–2) | — | 29,307 | 25–23 |
| 49 | May 25 | Reds | 4–6 | Haynes (4–5) | **Marquis** (3–3) | Graves (16) | 44,026 | 25–24 |
| 50 | May 26 | Reds | 7–5 | **Maddux** (5–2) | Reitsma (3–1) | — | 40,142 | 26–24 |
| 51 | May 27 | Expos | 5–1 | **Glavine** (8–2) | Armas (5–6) | — | 30,187 | 27–24 |
| 52 | May 28 | Expos | 5–2 | **Moss** (2–1) | Yoshii (2–2) | **Smoltz** (14) | 22,278 | 28–24 |
| 53 | May 29 | Expos | 3–4 | Tucker (4–0) | **Smoltz** (0–2) | Stewart (3) | 20,162 | 28–25 |
| 54 | May 30 | Expos | 5–2 | **Marquis** (4–3) | Pavano (3–6) | — | 24,025 | 29–25 |
| 55 | May 31 | @ Reds | 7–0 | **Maddux** (6–2) | Reitsma (3–2) | — | 38,777 | 30–25 |

June: 21–5 (Home: 10–2; Away: 11–3)

| # | Date | Opponent | Score | Win | Loss | Save | Attendance | Record |
|---|---|---|---|---|---|---|---|---|
| 56 | June 1 | @ Reds | 7–1 | **Glavine** (9–2) | Rijo (4–3) | — | 27,080 | 31–25 |
| 57 | June 2 | @ Reds | 1–5 | Dessens (4–3) | **Moss** (2–2) | — | 26,470 | 31–26 |
| 58 | June 3 | Mets | 5–4 | **Hammond** (2–2) | Trachsel (3–6) | **Smoltz** (15) | 31,704 | 32–26 |
| – | June 4 | Mets | Postponed (rain); rescheduled for September 11 | | | | | |
| 59 | June 5 | Mets | 6–4 | **Hammond** (3–2) | Strickland (5–3) | **Smoltz** (16) | 30,986 | 33–26 |
| 60 | June 6 | Mets | 3–2 | **Glavine** (10–2) | Weathers (2–2) | **Smoltz** (17) | 41,286 | 34–26 |
| 61 | June 7 | @ Rangers | 13–7 | **Hammond** (4–2) | Park (2–3) | — | 42,765 | 35–26 |
| 62 | June 8 | @ Rangers | 6–3 (10) | **Remlinger** (3–0) | Irabu (2–6) | **Smoltz** (18) | 48,776 | 36–26 |
| 63 | June 9 | @ Rangers | 9–3 | **Marquis** (5–3) | Burba (3–4) | — | 35,436 | 37–26 |
| 64 | June 10 | @ Twins | 5–6 (15) | Fiore (4–1) | **Ligtenberg** (0–3) | — | 24,534 | 37–27 |
| 65 | June 11 | @ Twins | 11–0 | **Glavine** (11–2) | Lohse (6–4) | — | 23,256 | 39–27 |
| 66 | June 12 | @ Twins | 3–2 | **Moss** (3–2) | Santana (1–1) | **Smoltz** (19) | 21,485 | 39–27 |
| 67 | June 14 | Red Sox | 2–1 | **Hammond** (5–2) | Martínez (7–2) | **Smoltz** (20) | 48,922 | 40–27 |
| 68 | June 15 | Red Sox | 4–2 | **Maddux** (7–2) | Burkett (7–2) | **Smoltz** (21) | 50,764 | 41–27 |
| 69 | June 16 | Red Sox | 1–6 | Lowe (11–2) | **Glavine** (11–3) | — | 45,666 | 41–28 |
| 70 | June 18 | Tigers | 0–6 | Weaver (5–8) | **Marquis** (5–4) | — | 28,173 | 41–29 |
| 71 | June 19 | Tigers | 4–1 | **Millwood** (4–5) | Maroth (1–1) | **Smoltz** (22) | 25,118 | 42–29 |
| 72 | June 20 | Tigers | 3–2 | **Ligtenberg** (1–3) | Acevedo (1–3) | — | 28,843 | 43–29 |
| 73 | June 21 | White Sox | 3–2 | **Gryboski** (1–1) | Ritchie (4–9) | **Smoltz** (23) | 35,102 | 44–29 |
| 74 | June 22 | White Sox | 15–2 | **Moss** (4–2) | Glover (2–3) | — | 47,276 | 45–29 |
| 75 | June 23 | White Sox | 9–1 | **Marquis** (6–4) | Wright (5–8) | — | 30,883 | 46–29 |
| 76 | June 24 | @ Mets | 3–2 | **Gryboski** (2–1) | Strickland (6–4) | **Smoltz** (24) | 34,708 | 47–29 |
| 77 | June 25 | @ Mets | 4–7 | Trachsel (6–6) | **Lopez** (1–4) | Benitez (19) | 31,607 | 47–30 |
| 78 | June 26 | @ Mets | 6–3 | **Hammond** (6–2) | Weathers (2–3) | **Smoltz** (25) | 30,974 | 48–30 |
| – | June 27 | @ Mets | Postponed (rain); rescheduled for September 27 | | | | | |
| 79 | June 28 | @ Red Sox | 4–2 | **Remlinger** (4–0) | Wakefield (2–3) | **Smoltz** (26) | 33,137 | 49–30 |
| 80 | June 29 | @ Red Sox | 2–1 | **Millwood** (5–5) | Lowe (11–4) | **Smoltz** (27) | 32,651 | 50–30 |
| 81 | June 30 | @ Red Sox | 7–3 (10) | **Remlinger** (5–0) | Urbina (0–3) | — | 32,348 | 51–30 |

July: 18–8 (Home: 10–4; Away: 8–4)

| # | Date | Opponent | Score | Win | Loss | Save | Attendance | Record |
|---|---|---|---|---|---|---|---|---|
| 82 | July 1 | Expos | 7–5 | **Ligtenberg** (2–3) | Vazquez (5–5) | **Smoltz** (28) | 26,053 | 52–30 |
| 83 | July 2 | Expos | 2–5 | Colon (11–4) | **Moss** (4–3) | Stewart (10) | 25,581 | 52–31 |
| 84 | July 3 | Expos | 6–5 | **Smoltz** (1–2) | Brower (3–1) | — | 23,439 | 53–31 |
| 85 | July 4 | Cubs | 5–1 | **Remlinger** (6–0) | Prior (2–2) | **Smoltz** (29) | 49,967 | 54–31 |
| 86 | July 5 | Cubs | 4–3 | **Millwood** (6–5) | Clement (6–6) | **Smoltz** (30) | 48,784 | 55–31 |
| 87 | July 6 | Cubs | 3–7 | Zambrano (1–1) | **Glavine** (11–4) | — | 49,961 | 55–32 |
| 88 | July 7 | Cubs | 2–0 | **Maddux** (8–2) | Lieber (6–6) | **Smoltz** (31) | 34,140 | 56–32 |
**73rd All-Star Game in Milwaukee, Wisconsin**
| 89 | July 11 | @ Expos | 8–5 | **Millwood** (7–5) | Armas (8–8) | **Smoltz** (32) | 11,855 | 57–32 |
| 90 | July 12 | @ Expos | 8–3 | **Remlinger** (7–0) | Tucker (4–1) | — | 14,256 | 58–32 |
| 91 | July 13 | @ Expos | 3–6 | Colon (12–4) | **Glavine** (11–5) | — | 17,335 | 58–33 |
| 92 | July 14 | @ Expos | 3–10 | Vazquez (7–5) | **Moss** (4–4) | — | 25,109 | 58–34 |
| 93 | July 15 | @ Cubs | 2–3 | Zambrano (2–1) | **Marquis** (6–5) | Alfonseca (12) | 40,206 | 58–35 |
| 94 | July 16 | @ Cubs | 2–0 | **Millwood** (8–5) | Lieber (6–7) | **Smoltz** (33) | 39,118 | 59–35 |
| 95 | July 17 | Marlins | 10–0 | **Maddux** (9–2) | Burnett (8–7) | — | 40,292 | 60–35 |
| 96 | July 18 | Marlins | 3–1 | **Glavine** (12–5) | Tavarez (7–6) | **Smoltz** (34) | 34,805 | 61–35 |
| 97 | July 19 | @ Phillies | 4–1 | **Moss** (5–4) | Duckworth (5–8) | **Smoltz** (35) | 20,422 | 62–35 |
| 98 | July 20 | @ Phillies | 4–3 | **Marquis** (7–5) | Adams (4–7) | **Smoltz** (36) | 23,570 | 63–35 |
| 99 | July 21 | @ Phillies | 2–1 | **Millwood** (9–5) | Wolf (5–7) | **Spooneybarger** (1) | 25,012 | 64–35 |
| 100 | July 22 | @ Marlins | 1–2 | Burnett (9–7) | **Maddux** (9–3) | Looper (2) | 10,125 | 64–36 |
| 101 | July 23 | @ Marlins | 5–3 | **Glavine** (13–5) | Tavarez (7–7) | **Smoltz** (37) | 12,210 | 65–36 |
| 102 | July 24 | @ Marlins | 10–0 | **Moss** (6–4) | Tejera (6–3) | — | 10,375 | 66–36 |
| 103 | July 26 | Phillies | 2–3 | Wolf (6–7) | **Millwood** (9–6) | Mesa (28) | 44,744 | 66–37 |
| 104 | July 27 | Phillies | 5–3 | **Maddux** (10–3) | Roa (0–1) | **Smoltz** (38) | 43,214 | 67–37 |
| 105 | July 28 | Phillies | 1–7 | Padilla (11–6) | **Glavine** (13–6) | — | 31,764 | 67–38 |
| 106 | July 30 | Brewers | 3–2 | **Moss** (7–4) | Quevedo (6–8) | **Smoltz** (39) | 30,802 | 68–38 |
| 107 | July 31 | Brewers | 9–1 | **Millwood** (10–6) | Sheets (5–13) | — | 25,874 | 69–38 |

August: 16–11 (Home: 7–3; Away: 9–8)

| # | Date | Opponent | Score | Win | Loss | Save | Attendance | Record |
|---|---|---|---|---|---|---|---|---|
| 108 | August 1 | Brewers | 4–0 | **Maddux** (11–3) | Rusch (5–11) | — | 29,168 | 70–38 |
| 109 | August 2 | Cardinals | 11–5 | **Glavine** (14–6) | Simontacchi (7–3) | — | 45,512 | 71–38 |
| 110 | August 3 | Cardinals | 6–1 | **Marquis** (8–5) | Morris (12–7) | — | 46,356 | 72–38 |
| 111 | August 4 | Cardinals | 2–1 | **Smoltz** (2–2) | Veres (4–7) | — | 33,686 | 73–38 |
| 112 | August 6 | @ Diamondbacks | 4–3 (13) | **Ligtenberg** (3–3) | Koplove (3–1) | — | 46,676 | 74–38 |
| 113 | August 7 | @ Diamondbacks | 3–6 | Mantei (2–1) | **Remlinger** (7–1) | Kim (28) | 44,948 | 74–39 |
| 114 | August 8 | @ Diamondbacks | 4–1 | **Glavine** (15–6) | Anderson (5–8) | **Smoltz** (40) | 40,115 | 75–39 |
| 115 | August 9 | @ Astros | 6–5 (13) | **Spooneybarger** (1–0) | Cruz (1–6) | **Smoltz** (41) | 41,416 | 76–39 |
| 116 | August 10 | @ Astros | 5–8 | Saarloos (5–2) | **Marquis** (8–6) | Wagner (25) | 43,332 | 76–40 |
| 117 | August 11 | @ Astros | 13–3 | **Millwood** (11–6) | Mlicki (4–8) | — | 41,092 | 77–40 |
| 118 | August 13 | Giants | 2–7 | Ortiz (8–8) | **Maddux** (11–4) | — | 39,794 | 77–41 |
| 119 | August 14 | Giants | 1–0 | **Glavine** (16–6) | Hernandez (7–13) | **Smoltz** (42) | 31,039 | 78–41 |
| 120 | August 15 | Giants | 3–3 (10) | **Game called (rain)** (game was not made up, tie does not count in record) | | | 35,340 | 78–41 |
| 121 | August 16 | Rockies | 4–1 | **Millwood** (12–6) | Chacon (5–10) | **Smoltz** (43) | 30,504 | 79–41 |
| 122 | August 17 | Rockies | 3–10 | Stark (8–3) | **Marquis** (8–7) | — | 46,104 | 79–42 |
| 123 | August 18 | Rockies | 3–6 | Jennings (14–5) | **Maddux** (11–5) | Jimenez (33) | 30,399 | 79–43 |
| 124 | August 19 | Rockies | 7–6 | **Smoltz** (3–2) | Jimenez (2–8) | — | 24,568 | 80–43 |
| 125 | August 20 | @ Padres | 2–6 | Tomko (7–8) | **Moss** (7–5) | — | 21,440 | 80–44 |
| 126 | August 21 | @ Padres | 6–3 | **Millwood** (13–6) | Tankersley (1–3) | **Smoltz** (44) | 22,471 | 81–44 |
| 127 | August 22 | @ Padres | 2–9 | Bynum (1–0) | **Marquis** (8–8) | — | 23,569 | 81–45 |
| 128 | August 23 | @ Dodgers | 3–4 | Gagne (2–1) | **Holmes** (2–2) | — | 50,341 | 81–46 |
| 129 | August 24 | @ Dodgers | 3–4 | Shuey (6–2) | **Glavine** (16–7) | Gagne (44) | 54,212 | 81–47 |
| 130 | August 25 | @ Dodgers | 7–5 | **Moss** (8–5) | Ishii (13–9) | **Smoltz** (45) | 50,306 | 82–47 |
| 131 | August 27 | @ Pirates | 5–4 | **Millwood** (14–6) | Fogg (11–10) | **Smoltz** (46) | 20,542 | 83–47 |
| 132 | August 28 | @ Pirates | 0–1 (10) | Williams (2–5) | **Remlinger** (7–2) | — | 20,136 | 83–48 |
| 133 | August 29 | @ Pirates | 1–4 | Arroyo (2–1) | **Glavine** (16–8) | Williams (38) | 17,312 | 83–49 |
| 134 | August 30 | @ Expos | 4–2 | **Moss** (9–5) | Armas (8–12) | **Smoltz** (47) | 7,659 | 84–49 |
| 135 | August 31 | @ Expos | 5–3 | **Hammond** (7–2) | Vazquez (8–12) | **Smoltz** (48) | 8,528 | 85–49 |

September: 16–10 (Home: 9–6; Away: 7–4)

| # | Date | Opponent | Score | Win | Loss | Save | Attendance | Record |
|---|---|---|---|---|---|---|---|---|
| 136 | September 1 | @ Expos | 6–4 | **Millwood** (15–6) | Yoshii (4–7) | **Smoltz** (49) | 10,581 | 86–49 |
| 137 | September 2 | Pirates | 5–1 | **Maddux** (12–5) | Meadows (1–4) | — | 30,803 | 87–49 |
| 138 | September 3 | Pirates | 0–3 | Torres (1–0) | **Glavine** (16–9) | Williams (39) | 18,931 | 87–50 |
| 139 | September 4 | Pirates | 6–0 | **Moss** (10–5) | Wells (12–13) | — | 19,525 | 88–50 |
| 140 | September 6 | Expos | 5–0 | **Millwood** (16–6) | Yoshii (4–8) | — | 24,361 | 89–50 |
| 141 | September 7 | Expos | 4–0 | **Maddux** (13–5) | Ohka (13–7) | — | 34,424 | 90–50 |
| 142 | September 8 | Expos | 0–7 | Colon (18–7) | **Glavine** (16–10) | — | 25,551 | 90–51 |
| 143 | September 10 | Mets | 12–6 | **Hodges** (1–0) | Astacio (12–9) | — | 28,214 | 91–51 |
| 144 | September 11 (1) | Mets | 8–5 | **Millwood** (17–6) | Trachsel (9–11) | **Smoltz** (50) | 19,802 | 92–51 |
| 145 | September 11 (2) | Mets | 0–5 | Leiter (13–11) | **Marquis** (8–9) | — | 26,734 | 92–52 |
| 146 | September 13 | @ Marlins | 3–13 | Pavano (5–10) | **Maddux** (13–6) | — | 10,436 | 92–53 |
| 147 | September 14 | @ Marlins | 10–5 | **Glavine** (17–10) | Beckett (5–7) | — | 13,527 | 93–53 |
| 148 | September 15 | @ Marlins | 6–4 | **Moss** (11–5) | Wayne (1–2) | **Smoltz** (51) | 7,844 | 94–53 |
| 149 | September 16 | @ Marlins | 1–5 | Penny (7–6) | **Millwood** (17–7) | — | 6,103 | 94–54 |
| 150 | September 17 | Phillies | 2–1 | **Maddux** (14–6) | Padilla (11–11) | **Smoltz** (52) | 23,082 | 95–54 |
| 151 | September 18 | Phillies | 5–6 | Silva (5–0) | **Ligtenberg** (3–4) | Mesa (41) | 20,356 | 95–55 |
| 152 | September 19 | Phillies | 6–0 | **Glavine** (18–10) | Roa (4–4) | — | 23,482 | 96–55 |
| 153 | September 20 | Marlins | 2–6 | Wayne (2–2) | **Moss** (11–6) | — | 28,869 | 96–56 |
| 154 | September 21 | Marlins | 4–6 | Penny (8–6) | **Millwood** (17–8) | Looper (11) | 37,131 | 96–57 |
| 155 | September 22 | Marlins | 4–1 | **Maddux** (15–6) | Tavarez (10–12) | **Smoltz** (53) | 32,172 | 97–57 |
| 156 | September 24 | @ Phillies | 3–5 | Junge (2–0) | **Glavine** (18–11) | Mesa (45) | 15,807 | 97–58 |
| 157 | September 25 | @ Phillies | 7–1 | **Moss** (12–6) | Myers (4–5) | — | 14,516 | 98–58 |
| – | September 26 | @ Phillies | Cancelled (rain) | | | | | |
| 158 | September 27 (1) | @ Mets | 3–1 | **Maddux** (16–6) | Thomson (9–14) | **Smoltz** (54) | N/A | 99–58 |
| 159 | September 27 (2) | @ Mets | 7–4 | **Millwood** (18–8) | Astacio (12–11) | — | 33,527 | 100–58 |
| 160 | September 28 | @ Mets | 5–2 | **Hodges** (2–0) | Leiter (13–13) | **Smoltz** (55) | 38,988 | 101–58 |
| 161 | September 29 | @ Mets | 1–6 | Trachsel (11–11) | **Remlinger** (7–3) | — | 37,721 | 101–59 |

Legend: = Win = Loss
Bold = Braves team member

== Player stats ==
=== Batting ===
==== Starters by position ====
Note: Pos = Position; G = Games played; AB = At bats; H = Hits; Avg. = Batting average; HR = Home runs; RBI = Runs batted in

| Pos | Player | G | AB | H | Avg. | HR | RBI |
|---|---|---|---|---|---|---|---|
| C | Javy López | 109 | 347 | 81 | .233 | 11 | 52 |
| 1B | Julio Franco | 125 | 338 | 96 | .284 | 6 | 30 |
| 2B | Keith Lockhart | 128 | 296 | 64 | .216 | 5 | 32 |
| SS | Rafael Furcal | 154 | 636 | 175 | .275 | 8 | 47 |
| 3B | Vinny Castilla | 143 | 543 | 126 | .232 | 12 | 61 |
| LF | Chipper Jones | 158 | 548 | 179 | .327 | 26 | 100 |
| CF | Andruw Jones | 154 | 560 | 148 | .264 | 35 | 94 |
| RF | Gary Sheffield | 135 | 492 | 151 | .307 | 25 | 84 |

==== Other batters ====
Note: G = Games played; AB = At bats; H = Hits; Avg. = Batting average; HR = Home runs; RBI = Runs batted in

| Player | G | AB | H | Avg. | HR | RBI |
|---|---|---|---|---|---|---|
| Henry Blanco | 81 | 221 | 45 | .204 | 6 | 22 |
| Marcus Giles | 68 | 213 | 49 | .230 | 8 | 23 |
| Darren Bragg | 109 | 212 | 57 | .269 | 3 | 15 |
| Mark DeRosa | 72 | 212 | 63 | .297 | 5 | 23 |
| Wes Helms | 85 | 210 | 51 | .243 | 6 | 22 |
| Matt Franco | 81 | 205 | 65 | .317 | 6 | 30 |
| B.J. Surhoff | 25 | 75 | 22 | .293 | 0 | 9 |
| Jesse Garcia | 39 | 61 | 12 | .197 | 0 | 5 |
| Steve Torrealba | 13 | 17 | 1 | .059 | 0 | 1 |
| Ryan Langerhans | 1 | 1 | 0 | .000 | 0 | 0 |

=== Pitching ===
==== Starting pitchers ====
Note: G = Games pitched; IP = Innings pitched; W = Wins; L = Losses; ERA = Earned run average; SO = Strikeouts

| Player | G | IP | W | L | ERA | SO |
|---|---|---|---|---|---|---|
| Tom Glavine | 36 | 224.2 | 18 | 11 | 2.96 | 127 |
| Kevin Millwood | 35 | 217.0 | 18 | 8 | 3.24 | 178 |
| Greg Maddux | 34 | 199.1 | 16 | 6 | 2.62 | 118 |
| Damian Moss | 33 | 179.0 | 12 | 6 | 3.42 | 111 |
| Jason Marquis | 22 | 114.1 | 8 | 9 | 5.04 | 84 |
| Jung Bong | 1 | 6.0 | 0 | 1 | 7.50 | 4 |
| John Ennis | 1 | 4.0 | 0 | 0 | 4.50 | 1 |

==== Other pitchers ====
Note: G = Games pitched; IP = Innings pitched; W = Wins; L = Losses; ERA = Earned run average; SO = Strikeouts

| Player | G | IP | W | L | ERA | SO |
|---|---|---|---|---|---|---|
| Albie Lopez | 30 | 55.2 | 1 | 4 | 4.37 | 39 |

==== Relief pitchers ====
Note: G = Games pitched; W = Wins; L = Losses; SV = Saves; ERA = Earned run average; SO = Strikeouts

| Player | G | W | L | SV | ERA | SO |
|---|---|---|---|---|---|---|
| John Smoltz | 75 | 3 | 2 | 55 | 3.25 | 85 |
| Mike Remlinger | 73 | 7 | 3 | 0 | 1.99 | 69 |
| Chris Hammond | 63 | 7 | 2 | 0 | 0.95 | 63 |
| Kevin Gryboski | 57 | 2 | 1 | 0 | 3.48 | 33 |
| Darren Holmes | 55 | 2 | 2 | 1 | 1.81 | 47 |
| Kerry Ligtenberg | 52 | 3 | 4 | 0 | 2.97 | 51 |
| Tim Spooneybarger | 51 | 1 | 0 | 1 | 2.63 | 33 |
| John Foster | 5 | 1 | 0 | 0 | 10.80 | 6 |
| Trey Hodges | 4 | 2 | 0 | 0 | 5.40 | 6 |
| Andy Pratt | 1 | 0 | 0 | 0 | 6.75 | 1 |
| Joey Dawley | 1 | 0 | 0 | 0 | 0.00 | 1 |
| Aaron Small | 1 | 0 | 0 | 0 | 27.00 | 1 |

== Postseason ==
=== Game log ===
2002 Postseason Game Log
National League Division Series: 2–3

| # | Date | Opponent | Score | Win | Loss | Save | Attendance | Record |
|---|---|---|---|---|---|---|---|---|
| 1 | October 2 | Giants | 5–8 | Ortiz (1–0) | Glavine (0–1) | Nen (1) | 41,903 | 0–1 |
| 2 | October 3 | Giants | 7–3 | Millwood (1–0) | Rueter (0–1) | — | 47,167 | 1–1 |
| 3 | October 5 | @ Giants | 10–2 | Maddux (1–0) | Schmidt (0–1) | — | 43,043 | 2–1 |
| 4 | October 6 | @ Giants | 3–8 | Hernandez (1–0) | Glavine (0–2) | — | 43,070 | 2–2 |
| 5 | October 7 | Giants | 1–3 | Ortiz (2–0) | Millwood (1–1) | Nen (2) | 45,203 | 2–3 |

=== Postseason rosters ===
Playoff rosters
National League League Division Series

- Pitchers: 47 Tom Glavine 49 Kevin Gryboski 36 Chris Hammond 40 Darren Holmes 46 Kerry Ligtenberg 31 Greg Maddux 34 Kevin Millwood 27 Damian Moss 37 Mike Remlinger 29 John Smoltz
- Catchers: 20 Henry Blanco 8 Javy López
- Infielders: 19 Vinny Castilla 16 Mark DeRosa 23 Julio Franco 4 Matt Franco 1 Rafael Furcal 22 Marcus Giles 18 Wes Helms 7 Keith Lockhart
- Outfielders: 28 Darren Bragg 25 Andruw Jones 10 Chipper Jones 11 Gary Sheffield

== Award winners ==
2002 Major League Baseball season Braves' team pitching led the league with a 3.13 ERA. John Smoltz was National League Relief Man of the Year, as he led the league with 55 saves, which was a National League record at the time (since broken by Éric Gagné in 2003). Greg Maddux and Andruw Jones were chosen for Gold Glove awards.

2002 Major League Baseball All-Star Game Representing the Braves on the 2002 National League All-Star team were pitchers Tom Glavine, Mike Remlinger and John Smoltz. Andruw Jones was elected to receive the final roster spot on the 2002 National League All-Star team.

== Farm system ==
| Level | Team | League | Manager |
|---|---|---|---|
| AAA | Richmond Braves | International League | Fredi González |
| AA | Greenville Braves | Southern League | Brian Snitker |
| A | Myrtle Beach Pelicans | Carolina League | Randy Ingle |
| A | Macon Braves | South Atlantic League | Lynn Jones |
| Rookie | Danville Braves | Appalachian League | Ralph Henriquez |
| Rookie | GCL Braves | Gulf Coast League | Jim Saul |
