= J. D. Drew =

American baseball player (born 1975)

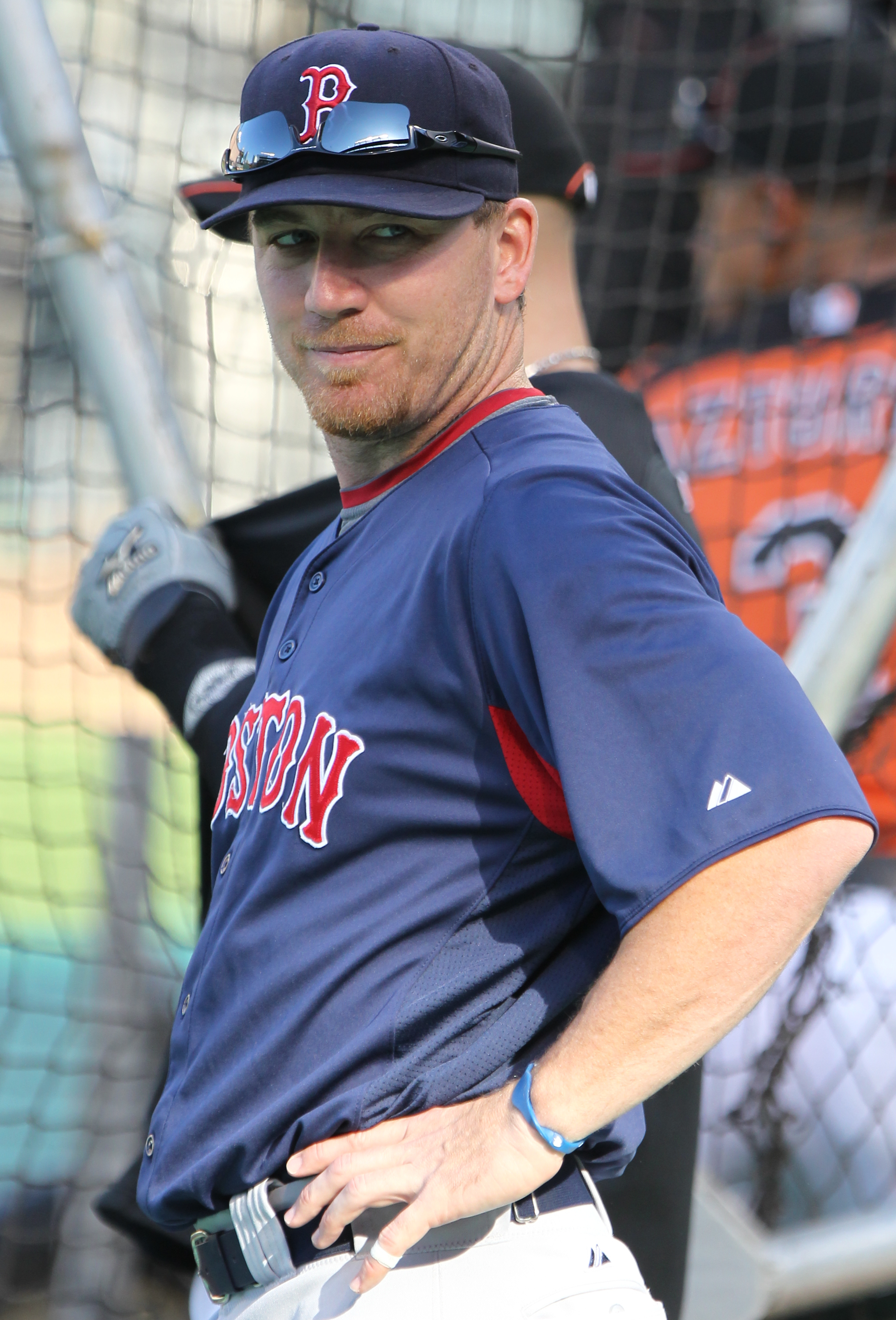
- Drew with the Boston Red Sox in 2011
- Right fielder
- Born: November 20, 1975 (age 50); Valdosta, Georgia, U.S.
- Batted: Left Threw: Right

MLB debut
- September 8, 1998, for the St. Louis Cardinals

Last MLB appearance
- September 28, 2011, for the Boston Red Sox

MLB statistics
- Batting average: .278
- Home runs: 242
- Runs batted in: 795
- Stats at Baseball Reference

Teams
- St. Louis Cardinals (1998–2003); Atlanta Braves (2004); Los Angeles Dodgers (2005–2006); Boston Red Sox (2007–2011)

Career highlights and awards
- All-Star (2008); World Series champion (2007); Golden Spikes Award (1997); Dick Howser Trophy (1997)

David Jonathan "J. D." Drew (born November 20, 1975) is an American former Major League Baseball right fielder. He began his major league career in 1998 with the St. Louis Cardinals, and also played for the Atlanta Braves, Los Angeles Dodgers, and Boston Red Sox. He is the brother of two other major league players, Stephen and Tim.

== College ==
Drew graduated from Lowndes County High School in Valdosta, Georgia in 1994. He was drafted by the San Francisco Giants in the 20th round of the 1994 draft but did not sign. He then attended Florida State University, where he played under head coach Mike Martin. At Florida State, he was the winner of the 1997 Dick Howser Trophy and the 1997 Golden Spikes Award, was named the 1997 Collegiate Baseball Player of the Year, the 1997 Sporting News Player of the Year, and was a consensus All-American (1997). He also was named the 1997 ACC Player of the Year. He was a 1996 member of Team USA. Drew was First Team in 1996, was Freshman All-American in 1995 and was named to the College World Series All Tournament Team in 1995. He was the first player in college baseball history to hit 30 home runs and steal 30 bases in the same season. He set a Florida State record by batting .455 in 1997 while becoming one of only three players in college baseball history to have 100 hits, 100 runs and 100 RBIs. During his college career, Drew broke 17 school and conference records.

== Professional career ==
=== 1997: Drafted by the Philadelphia Phillies ===
The Philadelphia Phillies made Drew the second overall pick, after pitcher Matt Anderson, in the 1997 MLB draft. Drew and his agent Scott Boras chose not to sign with the Phillies, insisting Drew would not sign for less than $10 million. The Phillies had no plan to pay an unproven player this amount of money, and despite Boras' warnings, drafted Drew nonetheless. They offered him $2.6 million. Consequently, Drew ended up playing for the St. Paul Saints of the independent Northern League. Boras had Drew sign with an independent baseball league because of a loophole in the rules of the MLB draft.

=== 1998–2003: St. Louis Cardinals ===
After playing for St. Paul in the 1997 season, Drew was selected in the first round of the 1998 MLB draft, fifth overall, by the St. Louis Cardinals. In June he signed a $7 million contract, then hit .316 through 26 games with the Triple-A Memphis Redbirds. He was recalled by the Cardinals and made his debut on September 8, 1998—the game in which teammate Mark McGwire broke the single-season home run record previously held by Roger Maris. Drew's first at bat, in the sixth inning, resulted in a strikeout, and he finished the night 0-for-2. He ended up going 15-for-36 (.417) during 1998, with five home runs.

On August 9, on what would have been Drew's first game in Philadelphia, he sat out, citing a bruised right hand. In an attempt to confuse the Philadelphia fans, he did not wear his own jersey that night, which instead was worn by bullpen catcher, Jeff Murphy. The attempt failed, however, and he was booed and heckled throughout batting practice. The only time he received cheers was when he booted three consecutive grounders in the outfield while his teammates were taking batting practice. On August 10, 1999, in Drew's first game at Veterans Stadium in Philadelphia, he was booed loudly, and even had batteries thrown at him by two fans. The Phillie Phanatic got into the act, dropping two large trash bags marked with dollar signs in the outfield between innings. Drew struggled to stay healthy, landing on the disabled list every season he played in St. Louis.

In his book Three Nights in August, Buzz Bissinger mentions former manager Tony La Russa's frustration with Drew's lack of passion. La Russa tells Bissinger that it seemed Drew had decided to "settle for 75%" of his talent, in large part because of his enormous contract.

=== 2004: Atlanta Braves ===
On December 13, 2003, Drew was traded to the Atlanta Braves along with catcher Eli Marrero for starting pitcher Jason Marquis, relief pitcher Ray King, and rookie prospect Adam Wainwright. There, he had the best season of his career while finally managing to stay healthy. In 2004, he displayed excellent power, patience, and defense, hitting .305 with 31 home runs, 118 walks, and 93 RBI, finishing sixth in the MVP voting.

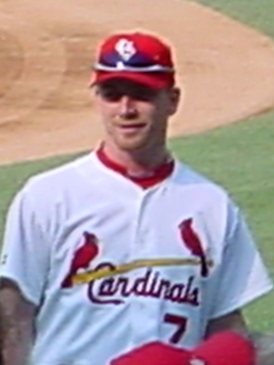
Drew in 2002

=== 2005–2006: Los Angeles Dodgers ===
In December 2004, Drew signed a five-year, $55 million contract with the Los Angeles Dodgers, which included an escape clause after the second year. Roughly halfway through the 2005 season, Drew's season was again cut short after being hit on the wrist by a pitch from Arizona Diamondbacks' pitcher Brad Halsey.

On September 18, 2006, Drew was part of only the (then) fourth-ever set of back-to-back-to-back-to-back home runs with fellow Dodgers Jeff Kent, Russell Martin, and Marlon Anderson.

In 2006, Drew exercised his contract opt-out clause, forgoing $33 million over the next three years to become a free agent. Dodgers general manager Ned Colletti said in a teleconference that he was "surprised how it came down. Everything we had heard, everything that had been written led us to believe the player loved being here." This was especially a surprise because a few days before, Drew had told an LA Times columnist on how happy he was in LA and that he was looking forward to the upcoming 2007 season. Drew had a very good season, batting .284 with 20 home runs and 100 RBI.

=== 2007–2011: Boston Red Sox ===
On January 26, 2007, Drew officially signed a five-year contract with the Red Sox worth $70 million. Drew's revised contract had a clause that allowed the Red Sox to opt out of Drew's five-year contract after three or four years if Drew has extensive injuries due to a previously existing problem in his right shoulder.

Drew was again part of a set of four consecutive home runs on April 22, 2007, in a game against the New York Yankees, this time joining with Manny Ramírez, Mike Lowell, and Jason Varitek. He is the only player to participate twice in a string of four straight home runs, and he was the second player to go deep in each instance. Drew finished the 2007 season with a .270 batting average, 11 home runs, and 64 RBI.

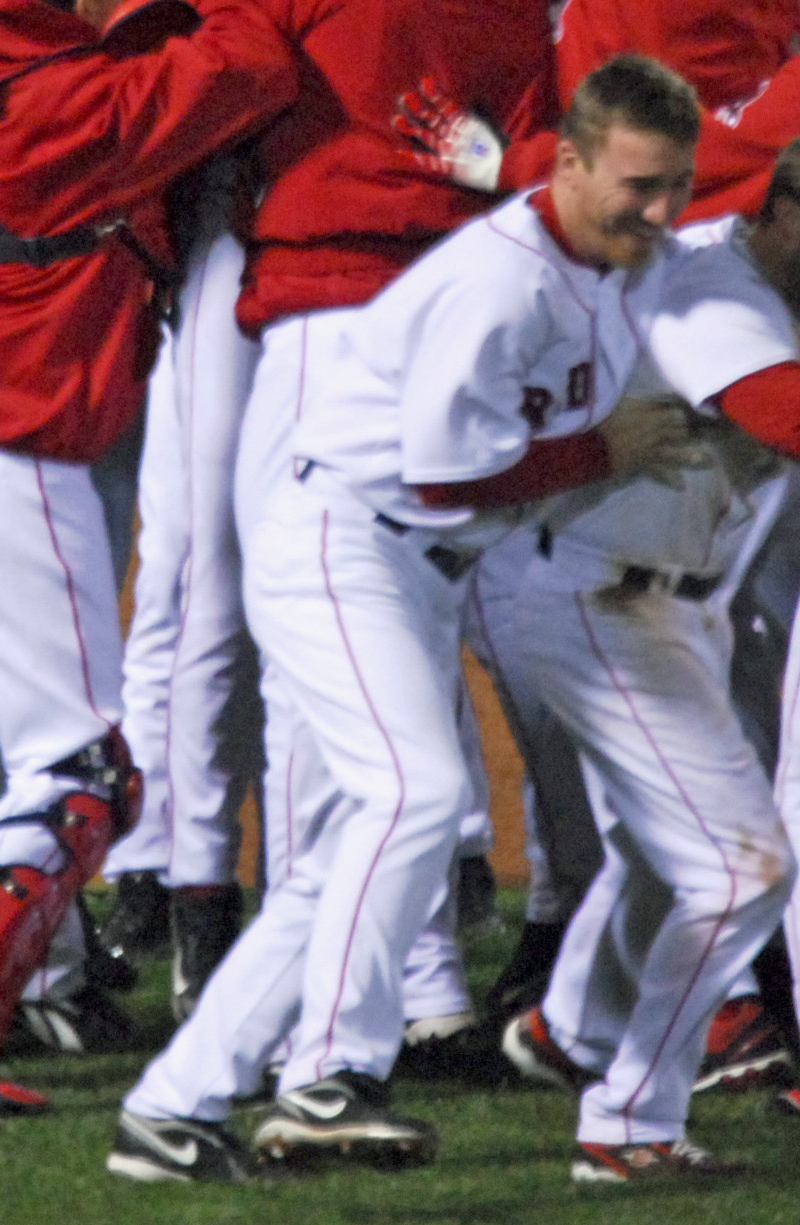
Drew celebrating a Red Sox 2008 playoff victory

On October 20, 2007, Drew hit a grand slam in Game 6 of the 2007 ALCS with the Red Sox facing elimination. The home run, along with brother Stephen Drew's for the Arizona Diamondbacks, marks the third time that two brothers have both hit home runs in the same postseason.

In 2008, Drew hit one of the longest home runs in Fenway Park history. According to the ESPN Home Run Tracker, it was measured at 460 feet. He finished with a .280 average, with an OBP of .408 and a slugging percentage of .519. At the end of June, Drew was named the AL Player of the Month after hitting .337 and hitting 12 home runs while taking over for David Ortiz's three-spot in the lineup while he was on the disabled list. Drew was officially announced as an AL All-Star reserve on July 6. This was Drew's first All-Star game appearance. He hit a two-run homer in his first at-bat as an All-Star en route to winning the game's MVP award. In what was to become the longest All-Star Game time-wise in MLB history, the American League (and Drew's Red Sox) manager Terry Francona, having almost run out of pitchers, contemplated putting Drew, a former high school hurler, on the mound to close the game. "I'd have been ready," Drew said. "I've had an opportunity to throw a lot in the outfield. I don't know if I would have gotten anyone out, but I'd have thrown something up there." Drew later visited the 15-day disabled list, spending from August 27 to September 8 on the DL with a strained lower back.

On October 3, in Game 2 of the 2008 American League Division Series against the Los Angeles Angels of Anaheim, Drew hit a go-ahead two-run home run. On October 16, in Game 5 of the American League Championship Series against the Tampa Bay Rays, Drew helped to bring the Red Sox back from a late-inning seven-run deficit with a two-run home run in the eighth inning and then delivered the walk-off hit in the ninth. The Game 5 comeback, sparked by Drew, is the second-biggest in postseason history and is the largest for a team on the brink of elimination. However, the Red Sox lost to the Rays in the seventh game.

After the 2009 season, Drew's statistics began to decline. That year, he hit .279 with an .392 OBP while hitting 24 home runs and 68 RBI. The following year, he hit .255 with 22 home runs with 68 RBI. However, he played in 139 games, his highest total since 2007 when he joined Boston. In 2011, Drew hit .222 with four home runs and 22 RBI. He played in 81 games and had a .315 OBP. Drew retired from professional baseball at the end of the 2011 season.

== Personal life ==
Drew's younger brother Tim was also drafted in the first round in 1997, making them the first brothers drafted in the first round of the MLB draft in the same year. They were teammates while on the Atlanta Braves in 2004. J. D., Tim, and their brother Stephen all played in Major League Baseball. J. D. and Stephen each won a World Series with the Boston Red Sox; J. D. in 2007 and Stephen in 2013.

Drew married his girlfriend Sheigh, on November 10, 2001, in Hahira, Georgia. Drew is a Christian.

== Career statistics ==
Years	Games	PA	AB	R	H	2B	3B	HR	RBI	SB	BB	SO	AVG	OBP	SLG	FLD%
14	1566	6153	5173	944	1437	273	48	242	795	87	862	1137	.278	.384	.489	.983

In 55 postseason games, Drew hit .261 (48-for-184) with 19 runs, six doubles, seven home runs, 25 RBI and 18 walks.

== See also ==
- List of Major League Baseball career home run leaders

Sporting positions
Preceded by Josh Hamilton	American League Player of the Month; June 2008	Succeeded by Miguel Cabrera
