= Matt Cepicky =

American baseball player (born 1977)

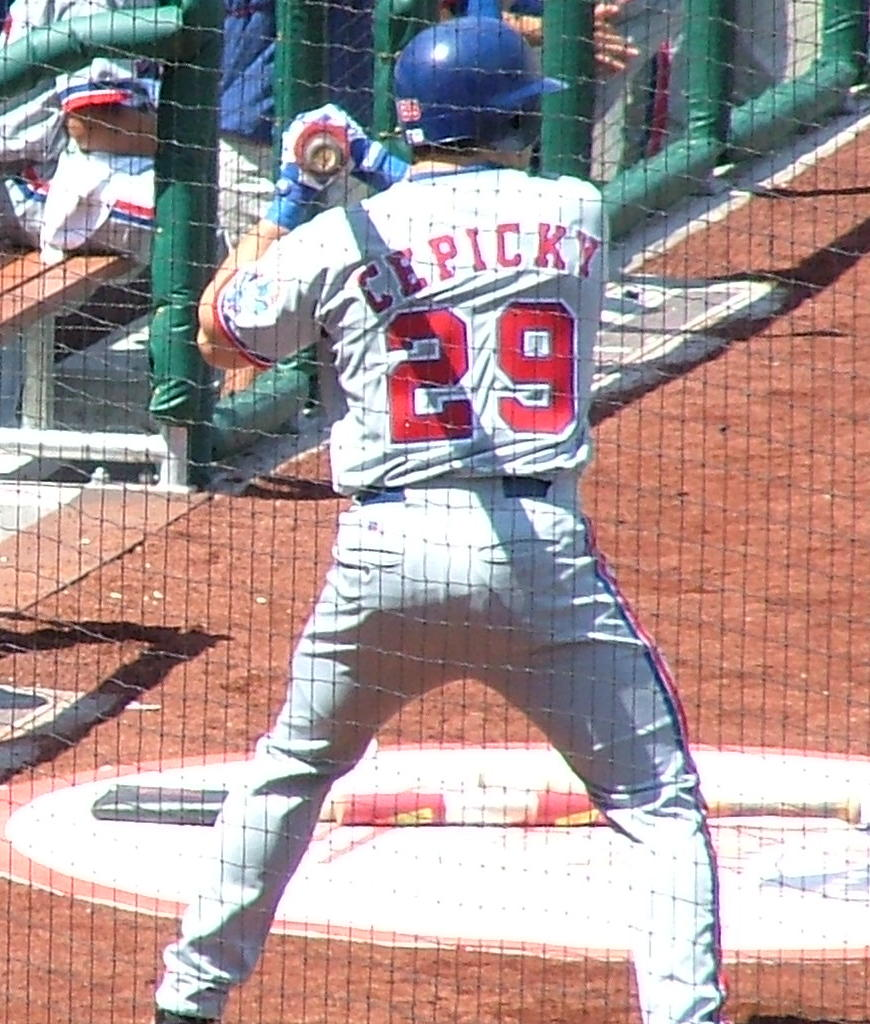
- Cepicky with the Montreal Expos in 2004
- Outfielder
- Born: November 10, 1977 (age 48); St. Louis, Missouri, U.S.
- Batted: Left Threw: Right

MLB debut
- July 31, 2002, for the Montreal Expos

Last MLB appearance
- May 2, 2006, for the Florida Marlins

MLB statistics
- Batting average: .211
- Home runs: 4
- Runs batted in: 21
- Stats at Baseball Reference

Teams
- Montreal Expos / Washington Nationals (2002–2005); Florida Marlins (2006)

Matthew William Cepicky (born November 10, 1977) is an American former professional baseball outfielder. He played in Major League Baseball (MLB) for the Montreal Expos / Washington Nationals and Florida Marlins between 2002 and 2006.

== Amateur career ==
A native of St. Louis, Missouri, Cepicky attended St. John Vianney High School and Missouri State University. In 1998, he played collegiate summer baseball with the Chatham A's of the Cape Cod Baseball League, where he was named a league all-star, helped lead Chatham to a league championship, and was named co-MVP of the league's playoffs. Cepicky was selected by the Expos in the 4th round of the 1999 MLB draft.

== Professional career ==
Cepicky's initial major league appearance came in 2002 with the Expos, and he played with the club in parts of each season through 2005, when the franchise moved to Washington. In 2006, he signed with the Marlins as a free agent, and appeared in nine games with the big league club. In 2007, he signed as a free agent with the Baltimore Orioles, and played for their Double-A affiliate, the Bowie Baysox, and Triple-A affiliate, the Norfolk Tides.
