= Andy Pratt (baseball) =

American baseball player (born 1979)

- Pitcher
- Born: August 27, 1979 (age 46); Mesa, Arizona, U.S.
- Batted: Left Threw: Left

MLB debut
- September 28, 2002, for the Atlanta Braves

Last MLB appearance
- April 12, 2004, for the Chicago Cubs

MLB statistics
- Win–loss record: 0–1
- Earned run average: 15.00
- Strikeouts: 2
- Stats at Baseball Reference

Teams
- Atlanta Braves (2002); Chicago Cubs (2004)

Andrew Elias Pratt (born August 27, 1979) is an American former Major League Baseball pitcher who played for the Atlanta Braves and Chicago Cubs. Pratt was selected by the Texas Rangers in the 9th round of the 1998 Major League Baseball draft and had a career ERA of 15.00 in 5 career appearances with the Braves and Cubs. He also played in the Texas Rangers organization from 1998–2001 and Milwaukee Brewers organization from 2004–2006. After his release from the Brewers organization in 2006, Pratt played the rest of the season for the Somerset Patriots of the independent Atlantic League. He has not played professionally since.
