= Joey Eischen =

American baseball player (born 1970)

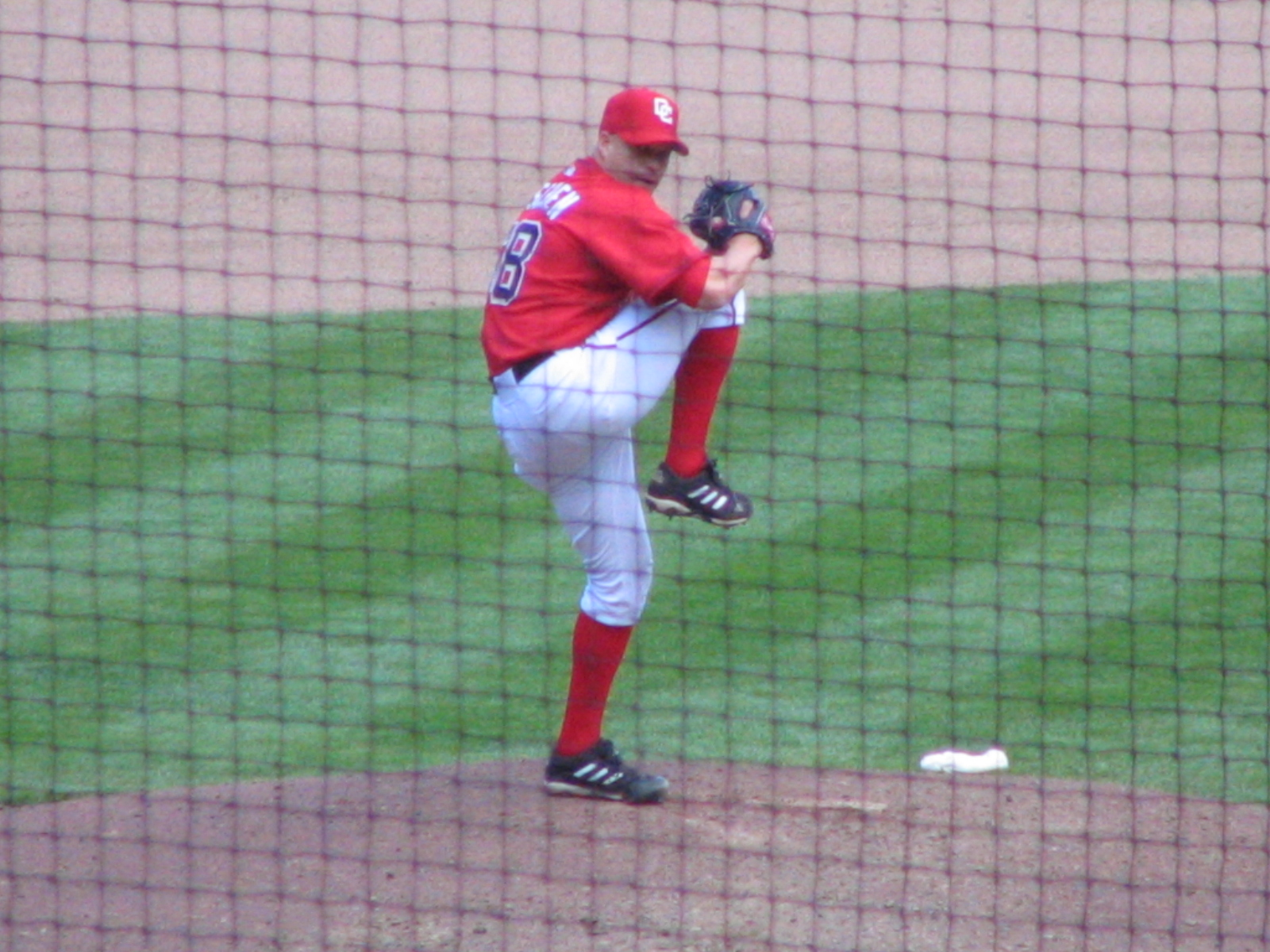
- Pitcher
- Born: May 25, 1970 (age 54); West Covina, California, U.S.
- Batted: Left Threw: Left

MLB debut
- June 19, 1994, for the Montreal Expos

Last MLB appearance
- May 29, 2006, for the Washington Nationals

MLB statistics
- Win–loss record: 11–9
- Earned run average: 3.67
- Strikeouts: 244
- Stats at Baseball Reference

Teams
- Montreal Expos (1994); Los Angeles Dodgers (1995–1996); Detroit Tigers (1996); Cincinnati Reds (1997); Montreal Expos / Washington Nationals (2001–2006)

Joseph Raymond Eischen (born May 25, 1970) is an American former relief pitcher in Major League Baseball.

== High school ==
Joey Eischen attended West Covina High School in West Covina, California, and was a letterman in football, basketball, baseball, and tennis. He graduated from West Covina High School in 1988.

== Major league career ==
Eischen made his Major League debut with the Montreal Expos on June 19, 1994. The following year he was traded to the Los Angeles Dodgers, appearing in 17 games, striking out 15 and walking 11 over 20 innings. He was traded again at the Major League trading deadline in 1996 to the Detroit Tigers. The Los Angeles Dodgers on July 31, 1996, traded him to the Tigers with pitcher John Cummings for outfielder Chad Curtis.

In his first full season, he struck out a career high 51 batters (a number he later tied in 2002). Before the 1997 season, Eischen was traded twice - first to the San Diego Padres, then again to the Cincinnati Reds.

Eischen only pitched in one game for the Reds in 1997 and did not appear in the major leagues again until 2001. He returned to the Expos in 2001 and stayed with the franchise until 2006, enjoying moderate success. He had his best season in 2002, finishing with a 6–1 record and an ERA of 1.34. In 2003, he appeared in a career high 70 games and had a very respectable 3.06 ERA. The workload apparently caught up to him the following season, as he pitched in only 21 games and his season was cut short by a shoulder injury.

He managed to come back in 2005 (with the relocated Washington Nationals) and appear in 57 games but was limited to a total of 36 innings. In one not-so-enviable instance, he went five consecutive outings without recording an out.

Eischen still managed to become a cult hero for Washington fans with his all out play and witty remarks. Commenting on Orioles owner Peter Angelos' objection to the Expos move to Washington, Eischen said "He's going to have to suck on it and like it. We're not going anywhere." It was well documented that he had to wear a mouth guard because he would grind his teeth when pitching.

Until he broke his arm diving for a ball, Eischen was an integral part of the Nationals bullpen as they led the NL East through the first half of 2005. The overachieving Nationals bullpen was worn thin and the starting pitching could not maintain the pace they had set through June. At 81-81, they finished the season in last place. Eischen was the first pitcher to register a win as a National. A favorite of Frank Robinson's, Eischen spent the first several innings of every game on the top step of the dugout alongside the Hall of Famer. Perhaps as a nod from Frank, Eischen relieved Chad Cordero and was the last Nationals hurler to throw a pitch that year.

In 2006, his last in the Majors, Eischen struggled drastically for the first two months of the season and was eventually put on the 60-day disabled list when he was scheduled to have season-ending surgery on his shoulder. After 6 consecutive seasons with the organization, he was released. His career ended after a failed comeback with the Detroit Tigers in 2007, in which he was cut during spring training.
