= Lee Stevens =

American baseball player (born 1967)

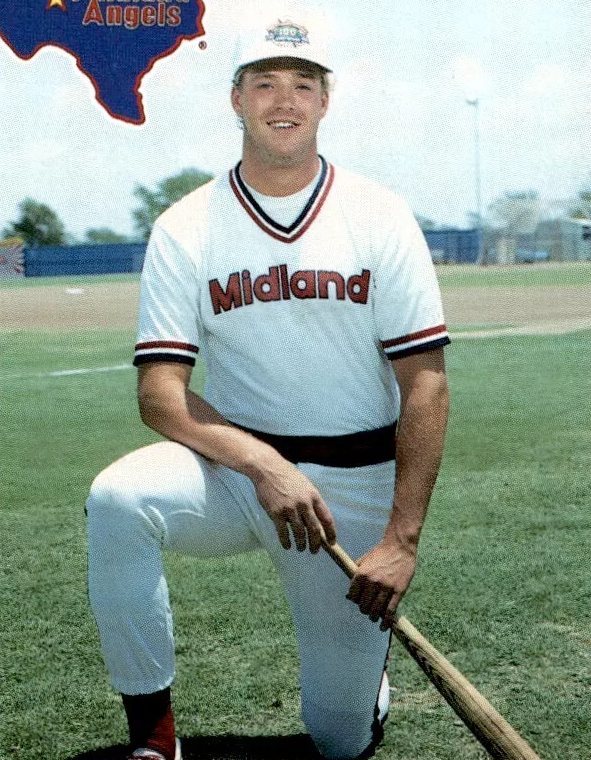
- Stevens with the Midland Angels c. 1988
- First baseman
- Born: July 10, 1967 (age 58); Kansas City, Missouri, U.S.
- Batted: Left Threw: Left

MLB debut
- July 16, 1990, for the California Angels

Last MLB appearance
- September 27, 2002, for the Cleveland Indians

MLB statistics
- Batting average: .254
- Home runs: 144
- Runs batted in: 531

NPB statistics
- Batting average: .262
- Home runs: 43
- Runs batted in: 136
- Stats at Baseball Reference

Teams
- California Angels (1990–1992); Kintetsu Buffaloes (1994–1995); Texas Rangers (1996–1999); Montreal Expos (2000–2002); Cleveland Indians (2002)

DeWain Lee Stevens (born July 10, 1967) is an American former first baseman and designated hitter in Major League Baseball. Drafted by the California Angels in 1986, he debuted for them in 1990, and also played for the Texas Rangers, Montreal Expos and Cleveland Indians over parts of ten major league seasons between 1990 and 2002. He also played for the Kintetsu Buffaloes in Nippon Professional Baseball.

== Biography ==
The California Angels selected Stevens out of Lawrence High School in Kansas in the first round (22nd overall) of the 1986 amateur draft. Rick Sutcliffe had been the only other high school player from the Kansas City area selected in the first round of the draft.

Stevens first played at the major-league level with the Angels between 1990 and 1992. A highly regarded prospect, the Angels considered him heir apparent to popular first baseman Wally Joyner; however, in parts of three major seasons he hit only .225 with little power. Stevens also batted .314 with 19 home runs for the Triple A Edmonton Trappers in 1991.

After about 200 at bats with the Angels in the 1992 season, Stevens was struggling with less than a .200 batting average and manager Buck Rodgers did not think he was open to receiving help. Working with hitting instructor Rod Carew, Stevens adjusted his batting stance to keep his bat on his shoulder. He hit .395 for the month of August and finished the season with a .221 batting average and seven home runs.

Traded to the Toronto Blue Jays organization the following January, Stevens spent the 1993 season in the minor leagues with the Class AAA Syracuse Chiefs of the International League. In 116 games, Stevens batted .264 with 14 home runs, though was not promoted to the major leagues that year. He signed with the Kintetsu Buffaloes in Japan after the 1993 season; he would get $425,000 for 1994, with an option for a second year. He hit 20 or more home runs in each of two seasons with the team.

After an American Association MVP season in 1996 where he hit 32 home runs, Stevens resurfaced with the Texas Rangers. He played in 27 games during the second half of that season. Though his role with the team was uncertain, Stevens took advantage of the opportunity to fill in for Will Clark and other injured Rangers. He hit .300 and had the first of five consecutive 20 home run seasons. Stevens played with the Montreal Expos from 2000 to the middle of the 2002 season, when he was traded to the Cleveland Indians with three minor league prospects (Cliff Lee, Brandon Phillips and Grady Sizemore) in exchange for Bartolo Colón and Tim Drew.

In 2003, Stevens was playing with the Indianapolis Indians, the Class AAA affiliate of the Milwaukee Brewers. He was hitting .281 in 18 games when he decided to retire from baseball.

In 2013, Stevens became the hitting coach for the Grand Junction Rockies, rookie affiliate of the Colorado Rockies.

He is more currently the hitting coach of the Hartford Yard Goats, the Double-A affiliate of the Rockies.
