= Tim Drew =

American baseball player (born 1978)

- Pitcher
- Born: August 31, 1978 (age 48); Valdosta, Georgia, U.S.
- Batted: Right Threw: Right

MLB debut
- May 24, 2000, for the Cleveland Indians

Last MLB appearance
- October 2, 2004, for the Atlanta Braves

MLB statistics
- Win–loss record: 2–4
- Earned run average: 7.02
- Strikeouts: 40
- Stats at Baseball Reference

Teams
- Cleveland Indians (2000–2001); Montreal Expos (2002–2003); Atlanta Braves (2004)
Medals
Men's baseball
Representing United States
World Junior Baseball Championship
| Bronze medal – third place | 1996 Sancti Spíritus | Team |

Timothy Andrew Drew (born August 31, 1978) is an American former professional baseball pitcher. Across a five year Major League Baseball (MLB) career that started in 2000, played for the Cleveland Indians, Montreal Expos, and Atlanta Braves. Drew both pitched and batted right handed. His two brothers, outfielder J.D. and infielder Stephen, also played in MLB.

Drew was drafted by the Indians in 1997 out of Lowndes High School, Georgia. He made his MLB draft in May 2000.

== Early life ==
Drew was born in Valdosta, Georgia, on August 31, 1978, and was the second of three children. He attended Lowndes High School, and like his brothers was drafted straight out of high school. However, unlike his brothers, Drew did not attend college.

At the 1996 World Junior Baseball Championship in Sancti Spíritus, Cuba, Drew earned a bronze medal with team USA.

== Career ==
=== Cleveland Indians ===
Drew was named the Indians' 1999 Minor League Player of the Year and received the Lou Boudreau Award.

In 2000, Drew made his MLB debut for the Cleveland Indians against the Detroit Tigers, in a match that ended in a 10-9 loss for the Indians. Over two years in Cleveland, Drew played eleven games.

=== Montreal Expos ===
In 2001, Drew was traded to the Montreal Expos alongside Bartolo Colón, in exchange for Grady Sizemore, Cliff Lee, Brandon Phillips and Lee Stevens. He made thirteen appearances, starting two, and pitched only 24.2 innings over his two years in Montreal. Now in the National Legaue, Drew made his batting debut in this year, having 5 at bats.

=== Atlanta Braves ===
Drew signed with the Braves in 2004 as a free agent. He went back into free agency after the 2004 season, and never played another game in the MLB.

=== Colorado Rockies ===
As a free agent, Drew signed with the Rockies in 2005 but did not make a start.

=== Post MLB Career ===
Drew signed with the Bridgeport Bluefish of the independent Atlantic League for the 2008 season. On July 29, 2008, Drew announced his retirement from professional baseball after going 3–3 with a 7.46 ERA for Bridgeport in 13 games.

== Personal life ==
Drew is a Christian.
