= T. J. Tucker =

American baseball player

- Pitcher
- Born: August 20, 1978 (age 47); Clearwater, Florida, U.S.
- Batted: Right Threw: Right

MLB debut
- June 3, 2000, for the Montreal Expos

Last MLB appearance
- June 17, 2005, for the Washington Nationals

MLB statistics
- Win–loss record: 13–9
- Earned run average: 4.57
- Strikeouts: 140
- Stats at Baseball Reference

Teams
- Montreal Expos / Washington Nationals (2000, 2002–2005)

Thomas John "T. J." Tucker (born August 20, 1978) is an American former Major League Baseball relief pitcher. Choosing to forgo his scholarship offer to kick for the University of Florida Tucker was drafted 47th overall in the MLB draft by the Montreal Expos. He pitched for the Montreal Expos in 2000, and from 2002 to 2004, and for the Washington Nationals in 2005 after they relocated from Montreal.

In 2008, Tucker pitched for the Bridgeport Bluefish until his release on August 22. He had a 7.39 ERA in 34 games.

== Personal life ==
Tucker attended River Ridge High School in New Port Richey, Florida. Tucker was an owner and Director of Operations with Z&T Lawn and Landscape in Palm Harbor, Florida.
