= Tony Armas Jr. =

Venezuelan baseball player (born 1978)

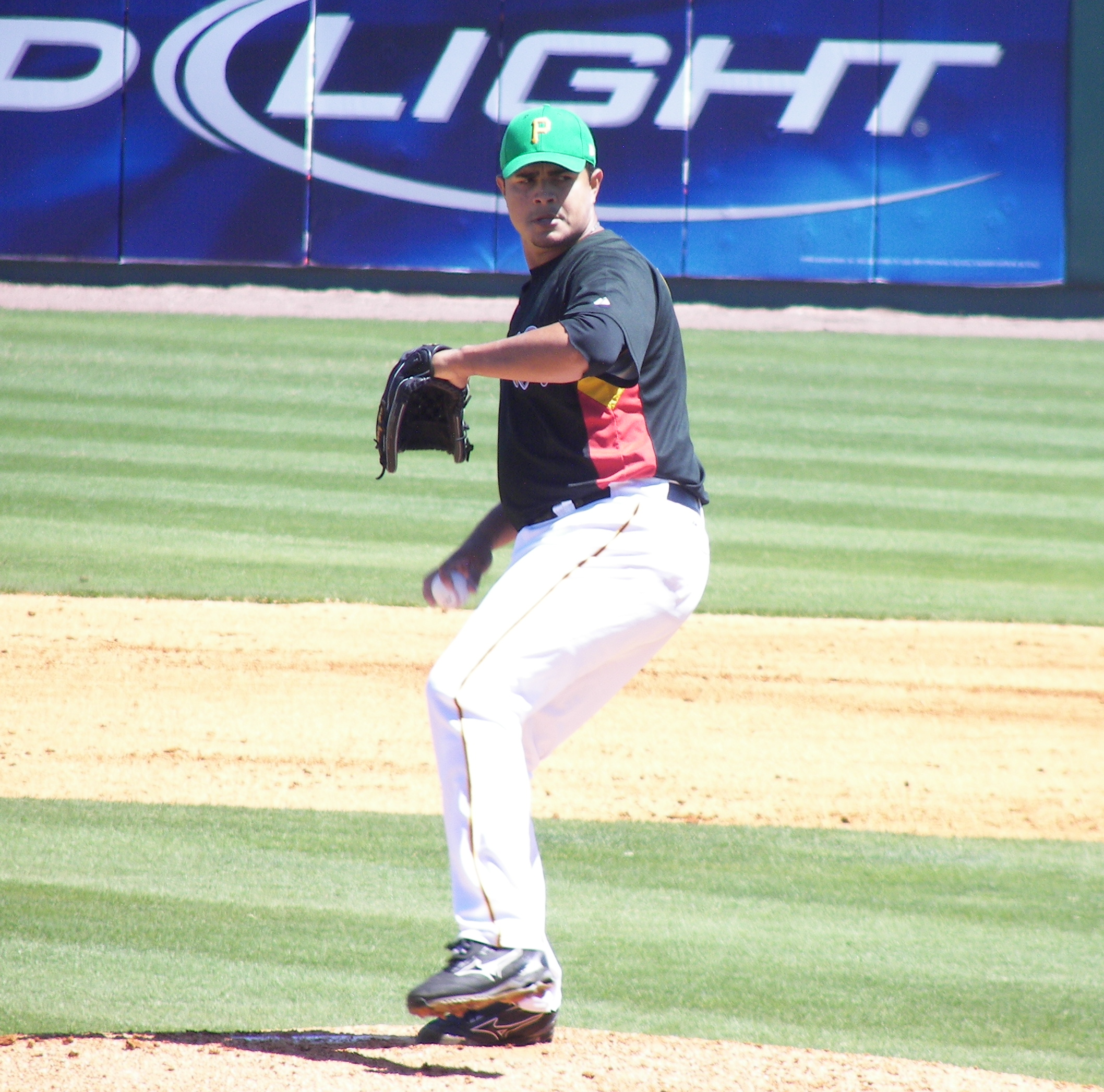
- Armas Jr. with the Pittsburgh Pirates
- Pitcher
- Born: April 29, 1978 (age 48); Puerto Píritu, Anzoátegui State, Venezuela
- Batted: Right Threw: Right

MLB debut
- August 16, 1999, for the Montreal Expos

Last MLB appearance
- July 7, 2008, for the New York Mets

MLB statistics
- Win–loss record: 53–65
- Earned run average: 4.65
- Strikeouts: 680
- Stats at Baseball Reference

Teams
- Montreal Expos / Washington Nationals (1999–2006); Pittsburgh Pirates (2007); New York Mets (2008)

Antonio José Armas (born April 29, 1978), better known as Tony Armas Jr., is a Venezuelan former professional baseball right-handed pitcher. He spent most of his active career with the Montreal Expos/Washington Nationals of Major League Baseball (MLB), and also played for the Pittsburgh Pirates and New York Mets.

== Professional career ==
=== New York Yankees ===
Armas was signed by the New York Yankees as an amateur free agent in 1994.

=== Boston Red Sox ===
Armas and a player to be named later (Jim Mecir), were traded to the Boston Red Sox in 1997 for Mike Stanley and Randy Brown.

=== Montreal Expos/Washington Nationals ===
He was sent to the Montreal Expos in 1997 along with pitcher Carl Pavano in exchange for Pedro Martínez.

Various injuries held him back until 2003, when he was the team's Opening Day starter, shutting down the Atlanta Braves at Turner Field, 10–2. But the strong start turned into a breakdown weeks later, after he was diagnosed with injuries in his arm and shoulder which required season-ending surgery. At that time, Armas had a record of 2–1, 23 strikeouts and a 2.61 ERA, with a WHIP of 1.065 and not allowing a home run until his fifth and last start.

Armas worked out in 2004 spring training, and his recovery was proceeding. Although the team initially hoped he could be ready for the start of the season, the rehabilitation was slower than expected. He finished the season with a 2–4 mark in 72 innings.

In a nine-year career, Armas had a 52–65 record with 674 strikeouts and a 4.62 ERA in 917.3 innings. At bat, he was a .098 hitter (26-for-265) with ten RBI.

During the 2006 season, Armas had a 9–12 record in 30 starts. Armas missed one month with arm problems, but in his second game back from the disabled list he pitched seven innings, allowing only one run on three hits.

On October 29, 2006, Armas filed for free agency.

=== Pittsburgh Pirates ===
On February 1, 2007, he signed with the Pittsburgh Pirates for a one-year $3.5 million contract with a 2008 mutual option. After starting the 2007 season 0–3 with an 8.92 ERA, Armas was removed from the rotation.

=== New York Mets ===
On February 11, 2008, he signed a minor league contract with an invitation to spring training with the New York Mets. He re-signed with the Mets in January 2009. However, he was released on March 31, 2009, after not making the team.

=== Atlanta Braves ===
In April 2009, he was signed by the Atlanta Braves and assigned to the Triple-A Gwinnett Braves. On July 25, 2009, the Braves released Armas.

== Pitching style ==
Armas used a low-90s moving fastball and a sharp-breaking curve to establish what he wanted to do with each hitter. He had an effective slider, a splitter, and a changeup to keep opponents out of balance.

== Personal life ==
Armas is the son of former All-Star outfielder Tony Armas, and a nephew of former first baseman Marcos Armas. Tony's father broke into the Majors with the Pittsburgh Pirates in 1976.

== See also ==
- List of Montreal Expos Opening Day starting pitchers
- List of second-generation Major League Baseball players
- List of Major League Baseball players from Venezuela
