= Damian Moss =

Australian baseball player (born 1976)

- Pitcher
- Born: 24 November 1976 (age 49); Darlinghurst, Australia
- Batted: Right Threw: Left

MLB debut
- 26 April, 2001, for the Atlanta Braves

Last MLB appearance
- 29 April, 2004, for the Tampa Bay Devil Rays

MLB statistics
- Win–loss record: 22–19
- Earned run average: 4.50
- Strikeouts: 204
- Stats at Baseball Reference

Teams
- Atlanta Braves (2001–2002); San Francisco Giants (2003); Baltimore Orioles (2003); Tampa Bay Devil Rays (2004)

Damian Joseph Moss (born 24 November 1976) is an Australian former Major League Baseball left-handed pitcher.

== Career ==
After making his Major League debut on 26 April, 2001, with the Atlanta Braves, Moss would also spend the 2002 season in Atlanta, where he placed fifth in the National League Rookie of the Year award. Moss split the 2003 season with the San Francisco Giants and Baltimore Orioles before landing with the Tampa Bay Devil Rays, where he played in 2004. While Moss excelled in his first season with the Braves, he subsequently struggled with inconsistency and poor control.

Moss has been traded twice, first from the Braves to the Giants with Merkin Valdéz for Russ Ortiz, and then, at the 2003 trading deadline, from the Giants to the Orioles with Kurt Ainsworth and Ryan Hannaman for Sidney Ponson.

Moss was suspended on 5 April 2005, while in the minor leagues for steroid use. He spent the entire season with the Triple A Tacoma Rainiers, the Triple-A affiliate of the Seattle Mariners. Despite a solid season, he was not called up to the majors.

On 12 May 2006, Moss was signed by the Long Island Ducks of the independent Atlantic League. Moss was signed by the Atlanta Braves, but they released him after just three starts in the minors. (1–2, 10.12 ERA) Moss joined the Mayaguez Indios for the 2006/2007 Winter League season in Puerto Rico.

Though a non-roster invitee for the San Francisco Giants during 2007 spring training, Moss opted to leave camp on 18 February for personal reasons, thereby moving to voluntarily retirement status. Moss signed a minor league contract with the Atlanta Braves on 14 February 2008. Moss began the season as a starting pitcher for the Braves' Triple-A affiliate before being demoted to Double-A in June. He became a free agent at the end of the season.

After both playing and being on the pitching staff of the Colorado Springs Sky Sox in 2009, Moss was signed by the Colorado Rockies to a minor-league deal on 1 February 2010.

He was released and pitched for the Long Island Ducks during 2010 and retired after the 2010 season.
