= Scott Stewart (baseball) =

American baseball player (born 1975)

- Pitcher
- Born: August 14, 1975 (age 50); Stoughton, Massachusetts, U.S.
- Batted: Right Threw: Left

MLB debut
- April 5, 2001, for the Montreal Expos

Last MLB appearance
- October 3, 2004, for the Los Angeles Dodgers

MLB statistics
- Win–loss record: 11–6
- Earned run average: 3.99
- Strikeouts: 161
- Stats at Baseball Reference

Teams
- Montreal Expos (2001–2003); Cleveland Indians (2004); Los Angeles Dodgers (2004)
Medals
Men's baseball
Representing United States
Pan American Games
| Silver medal – second place | 1999 Winnipeg | Team competition |

Scott Edward Stewart (born August 14, 1975) is an American former professional baseball pitcher.

== Career ==
Stewart attended East Gaston High School in Mount Holly, North Carolina. He was drafted by the Texas Rangers in the 20th round of the 1994 MLB draft.

He played for the Gulf Coast Rangers in 1994 and the Charleston RiverDogs in 1995 before the Rangers released him. He hooked up with the Gulf Coast Twins to finish the season. He played in an independent league in 1996 and then was purchased by the New York Mets who sent him to the St. Lucie Mets in 1997 and then to the Binghamton Mets (1998–1999) and Norfolk Tides (1998–2000).

Signed as a minor league free agent by the Montreal Expos in 2001, he played for the Ottawa Lynx briefly and then made his MLB debut with the Expos that year, appearing in 62 games in 2001, 67 in 2002 and 51 in 2003 for Montreal. In 2004, the Expos traded Stewart to the Cleveland Indians for Maicer Izturis and Ryan Church. The Indians assigned him to their AAA team, the Buffalo Bisons. He was later called up and appeared in 23 games for the Indians. After a trade to the Los Angeles Dodgers, he appeared in another 11 games for L.A. Stewart spent 2005 with the Norfolk Tides (New York Mets) and Portland Beavers (San Diego Padres), and did not pitch afterwards.
