= Masato Yoshii =

Japanese baseball player & coach (born 1965)

Masato Yoshii 吉井 理人
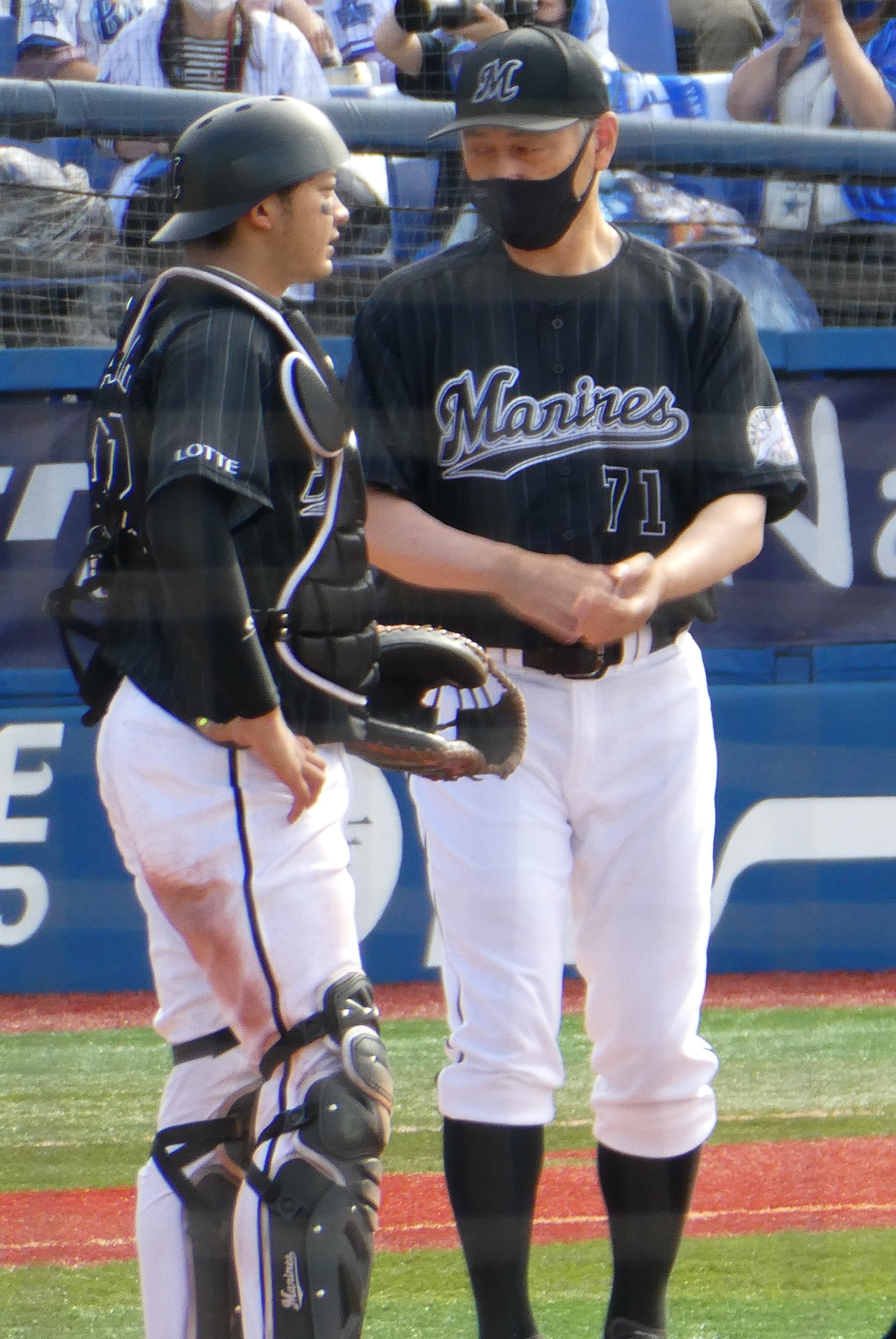
- Yoshii with the Chiba Lotte Marines

Tohoku Rakuten Golden Eagles – No. 81
- Pitcher / Coach / Manager
- Born: April 20, 1965 (age 61); Aridagawa, Wakayama, Japan
- Batted: Right Threw: Right

Professional debut
- NPB: September 16, 1985, for the Kintetsu Buffaloes
- MLB: April 5, 1998, for the New York Mets

Last appearance
- NPB: 2007, for the Chiba Lotte Marines
- MLB: September 11, 2002, for the Montreal Expos

NPB statistics
- Win–loss record: 89–82
- Earned run average: 3.86
- Strikeouts: 763

MLB statistics
- Win–loss record: 32-47
- Earned run average: 4.62
- Strikeouts: 447
- Stats at Baseball Reference

Teams
- As player: Kintetsu Buffaloes (1985–1994); Yakult Swallows (1995–1997); New York Mets (1998–1999); Colorado Rockies (2000); Montreal Expos (2001–2002); Orix BlueWave / Orix Buffaloes (2003–2007); Chiba Lotte Marines (2007); As coach: Hokkaido Nippon-Ham Fighters (2008–2012); Fukuoka SoftBank Hawks (2015); Hokkaido Nippon-Ham Fighters (2016–2018); Chiba Lotte Marines (2019–2021); As manager: Chiba Lotte Marines (2023–2025); Tohoku Rakuten Golden Eagles (2026–present)

Masato Yoshii (吉井 理人, Yoshii Masato; born April 20, 1965), nicknamed "Oiyan", is a Japanese former professional baseball pitcher, coach, and manager. He played in Nippon Professional Baseball (NPB) from 1985 to 2007 for the Kintetsu Buffaloes, Yakult Swallows, Orix BlueWave / Orix Buffaloes, and Chiba Lotte Marines. He also played in Major League Baseball (MLB) from 1998 to 2002 for the New York Mets, Colorado Rockies, and Montreal Expos.

== Playing career ==
Yoshii played in the Koshien high school baseball tournament twice. He joined the Kintetsu Buffaloes as the second round pick in the 1983 draft after graduating from the same elementary, middle, and high schools as former Seibu Lions' manager, Osamu Higashio. After spending some time in the minors, Yoshii marked his first victory in 1987. In 1988 he won 10 games and saved 24, which won him the Pacific League relief pitcher title. He won five games and marked another 20 saves his next year. In 1993, he became a starter. In 1995, he was traded to the Yakult Swallows, and finished with double digit victories each of the next three years.

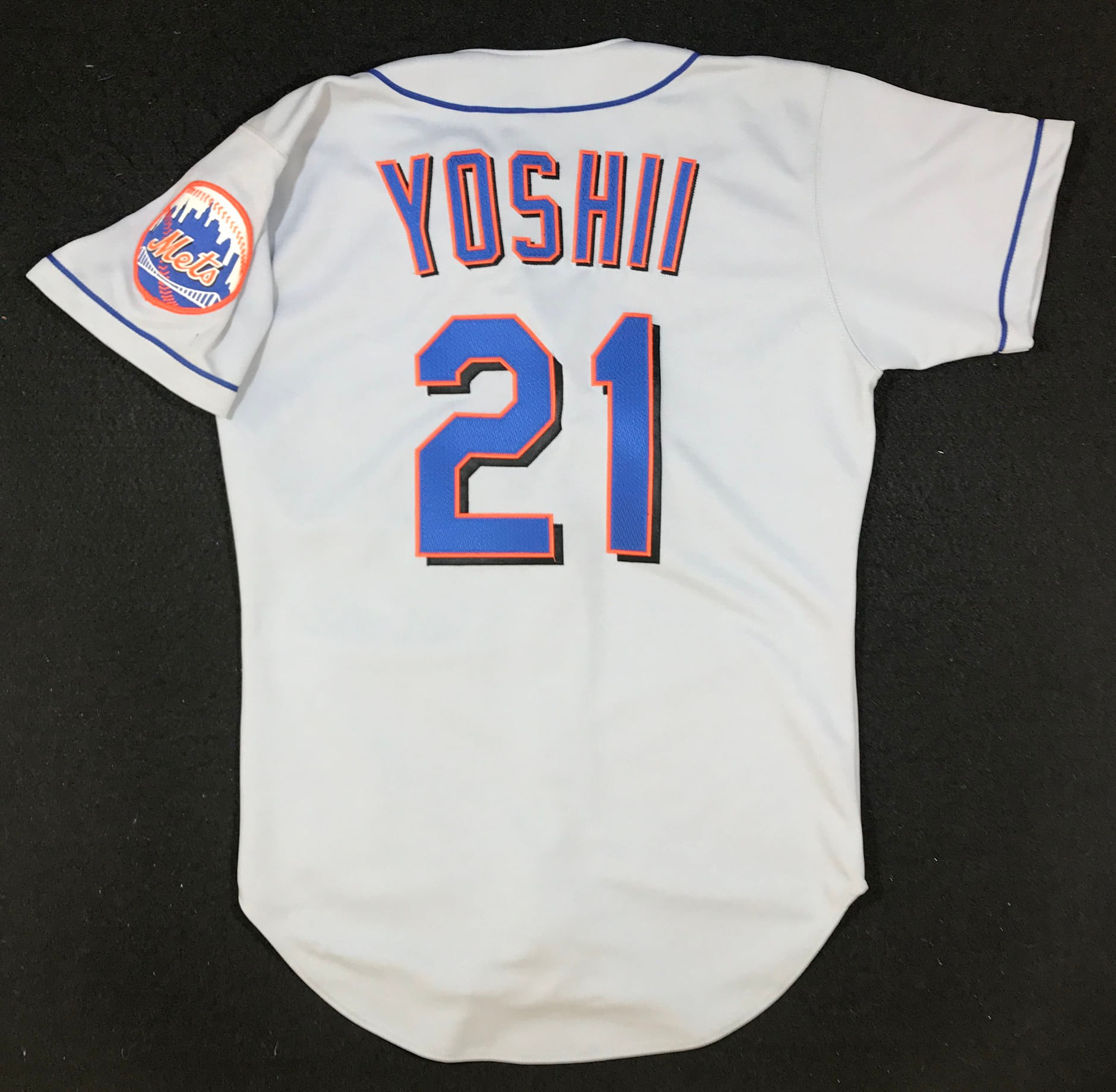
1998 New York Mets #21 Masato Yoshii road jersey

In the 1997 off-season he became a free agent, passing up on larger offers to instead sign with the New York Mets. In November 1998 he agreed to a two-year extension worth $5 million. In January 2000, with one year and $3 million left on Yoshii's contract, the Mets, in a move to save salary, traded Yoshii to the Colorado Rockies, receiving lefthander Bobby M. Jones in return. In September, Yoshii underwent surgery to remove bone spurs from his elbow. After the season, the Rockies declined a $4 million option on Yoshii for the following year. Instead, the two sides agreed to a new contract for the 2001 season, a deal which contained a low base salary to go with numerous incentive clauses. The team tried to trade him even before the season started, but eventually released Yoshii, who then signed with the Montreal Expos in March 2001. Yoshii had surgery on his left (non-pitching) shoulder in September 2002.

In 2003, Yoshii returned to Japan, joining the Orix BlueWave. He was the team's opening-day starter that year, but had surgery on his left ankle in August, ending the season with only two wins. The following year, 2004, he appeared in only three games, and was cut after the season. The Orix BlueWave merged with the Osaka Kintetsu Buffaloes during the off-season to form the Orix Buffaloes. Yoshii ended up joining the Buffaloes, and won six games over the course of the 2005 season.

In 2006, Yoshii marked a win against the Tohoku Rakuten Golden Eagles, becoming the fifth player to have recorded victories against 12 Japanese professional baseball teams. On April 1, 2007, he gave up two grand slams in one inning against the Rakuten Eagles, but the third baseman, Greg LaRocca, had committed an error before loading the bases, giving Yoshii the unusual statistic of 8 runs given up, none of them earned. On April 25, 2007, the 42-year-old Yoshii started the game against the Rakuten Eagles, with 18-year-old Masahiro Tanaka as the opposing pitcher. Yoshii pitched shutout ball over 5 innings, and was credited with the win. He thus became the sixth Japanese pitcher to have recorded a win at or above age 42, after Shinji Hamasaki, Tadashi Wakabayashi, Yoshinori Sato, Yutaka Ohno, and Kimiyasu Kudoh.

Yoshii continued to pitch during the season as a starter, but was demoted to relief duty by manager Terry Collins. Yoshii requested to be traded to another team where he could continue to start, and was sent to the Chiba Lotte Marines on June 28 in exchange for an outfielder. His pitching continued to decline, and he ended the season with a 0-10 record before being demoted to the minors. He was released by the Marines on November 13. He announced his retirement, and became a pitching coach for the Hokkaido Nippon-Ham Fighters under manager Masataka Nashida.

== Coaching career ==
On October 7, 2022, the Chiba Lotte Marines announced that Yoshii would manage the team for the upcoming season. On October 4, 2025, Marines announced his Yoshii's resignation from the team.

On June 17, 2026, the Tohoku Rakuten Golden Eagles announced that Yoshii was appointed as the new manager.

== See also ==
- List of Japanese baseball players
- List of Japanese players in Major League Baseball
