= 2002 Los Angeles Dodgers season =

2002 Los Angeles Dodgers
- League: National League
- Division: West
- Ballpark: Dodger Stadium
- City: Los Angeles
- Record: 92–70 (.568)
- Divisional place: 3rd
- Owners: Fox Entertainment Group
- President: Bob Graziano
- General managers: Dan Evans
- Managers: Jim Tracy
- Television: Fox Sports Net West 2; KCOP (13)
- Radio: KFWB; Vin Scully, Ross Porter, Rick Monday; KWKW; Jaime Jarrín, Pepe Yñiguez

The 2002 Los Angeles Dodgers season was the 113th for the franchise in Major League Baseball, and their 45th season in Los Angeles, California. The season saw Dan Evans take over as General Manager and in his first season the team won 92 games and was not eliminated from post season contention until the next-to-last day of the season, finishing third overall in the National League West. Shawn Green hit 42 home runs to become the first Los Angeles Dodger to have back-to-back 40 or more homer seasons (Duke Snider had four consecutive 40+ homer seasons when the team was in Brooklyn). He had four homers in one game on May 23 against the Milwaukee Brewers. He went 6-for-6 in that game and set a Major League mark for total bases with 19. The number broke the previous record of 18 total bases set by Joe Adcock. Éric Gagné, a former starter, was turned into the closer and proceeded to set a club record for saves with 52. This is also their first season to be broadcast on KCOP (13).

== Offseason ==
- November 9, 2001: Acquired Omar Daal from the Philadelphia Phillies for Jesus Cordero and Eric Junge.
- December 13, 2001: Acquired César Izturis and Paul Quantrill from the Toronto Blue Jays for Luke Prokopec and Chad Ricketts.
- December 21, 2001: Acquired Dave Roberts from the Cleveland Indians for Christian Bridenbaugh and Nial Hughes.
- January 15, 2002: Acquired Andrew Brown, Odalis Pérez and Brian Jordan from the Atlanta Braves for Gary Sheffield.
- February 21, 2002: Tim Crabtree was signed as a free agent.
- March 23, 2002: Acquired Guillermo Mota and Wilkin Ruan from the Montreal Expos for Matt Herges and Jorge Nunez.

== Regular season ==
=== Season standings ===
==== National League West ====
NL West
Team	W	L	Pct.	GB	Home	Road
Arizona Diamondbacks	98	64	.605	—	55‍–‍26	43‍–‍38
San Francisco Giants	95	66	.590	2½	50‍–‍31	45‍–‍35
Los Angeles Dodgers	92	70	.568	6	46‍–‍35	46‍–‍35
Colorado Rockies	73	89	.451	25	47‍–‍34	26‍–‍55
San Diego Padres	66	96	.407	32	41‍–‍40	25‍–‍56

==== Record vs. opponents ====
2002 National League record Source: MLB Standings Grid – 2002
Team	AZ	ATL	CHC	CIN	COL	FLA	HOU	LAD	MIL	MON	NYM	PHI	PIT	SD	SF	STL	AL
Arizona	—	3–3	4–2	6–0	14–5	5–1	3–3	9–10	4–2	4–2	5–2	4–3	4–2	12–7	8–11	2–4	11–7
Atlanta	3–3	—	4–2	4–2	4–3	11–8	3–3	2–4	5–1	13–6	12–7	11–7	3–3	3–3	3–3–1	5–1	15–3
Chicago	2–4	2–4	—	5–12	4–2	4–2	8–11	2–4	7–10	3–3	1–5	2–4	10–9	2–4	3–3	6–12	6–6
Cincinnati	0–6	2–4	12–5	—	3–3	5–1	6–11	4–2	13–6	1–5	2–4	2–4	11–7	5–1	2–4	8–11	2–10
Colorado	5–14	3–4	2–4	3–3	—	5–2	3–3	7–12	3–3	4–2	3–3	3–3	4–2	11–8	8–12	2–4	7–11
Florida	1–5	8–11	2–4	1–5	2–5	—	3–3	3–3	4–2	10–9	8–11	10–9	4–2	5–1	4–3	4–2	10–8
Houston	3–3	3–3	11–8	11–6	3–3	3–3	—	3–3	10–8	3–3	4–2	3–3	11–6	4–2	1–5	6–13	5–7
Los Angeles	10–9	4–2	4–2	2–4	12–7	3–3	3–3	—	5–1	5–2	4–2	4–3	4–2	10–9	8–11	2–4	12–6
Milwaukee	2–4	1–5	10–7	6–13	3–3	2–4	8–10	1–5	—	2–4	1–5	1–5	4–15	5–1	1–5	7–10	2–10
Montreal	2–4	6–13	3–3	5–1	2–4	9–10	3–3	2–5	4–2	—	11–8	11–8	3–3	3–4	4–2	3–3	12–6
New York	2–5	7–12	5–1	4–2	3–3	11–8	2–4	2–4	5–1	8–11	—	9–10	1–4	3–4	0–6	3–3	10–8
Philadelphia	3–4	7–11	4–2	4–2	3–3	9–10	3–3	3–4	5–1	8–11	10–9	—	2–4	2–4	3–3	4–2	10–8
Pittsburgh	2–4	3–3	9–10	7–11	2–4	2–4	6–11	2–4	15–4	3–3	4–1	4–2	—	2–4	2–4	6–11	3–9
San Diego	7–12	3–3	4–2	1–5	8–11	1–5	2–4	9–10	1–5	4–3	4–3	4–2	4–2	—	5–14	1–5	8–10
San Francisco	11–8	3–3–1	3–3	4–2	11–8	3–4	5–1	11–8	5–1	2–4	6–0	3–3	4–2	14–5	—	2–4	8–10
St. Louis	4–2	1–5	12–6	11–8	4–2	2–4	13–6	4–2	10–7	3–3	3–3	2–4	11–6	5–1	4–2	—	8–4

=== Opening Day lineup ===
Opening Day starters
Name	Position
Dave Roberts	Center fielder
César Izturis	Shortstop
Paul Lo Duca	Catcher
Shawn Green	Right fielder
Brian Jordan	Left fielder
Adrián Beltré	Third baseman
Eric Karros	First baseman
Mark Grudzielanek	Second baseman
Kevin Brown	Starting pitcher

=== Notable transactions ===
- July 22, 2002: Acquired Jolbert Cabrera from the Cleveland Indians for Lance Caraccioli.
- July 23, 2002: Acquired Tyler Houston and Brian Mallete from the Milwaukee Brewers for Ben Diggins and Shane Nance.
- July 25, 2002: Acquired Tom Farmer and Jason Frasor from the Detroit Tigers for Hiram Bocachica.
- July 28, 2002: Acquired Paul Shuey from the Cleveland Indians for Francisco Cruceta, Terry Mulholland and Ricardo Rodríguez.

=== Roster ===
2002 Los Angeles Dodgers
Roster
Pitchers: 57 Víctor Alvarez; 43 Andy Ashby; 58 Kevin Beirne; 27 Kevin Brown; 55 Giovanni Carrara; 49 Bryan Corey; 36 Omar Daal; 51 Robert Ellis; 38 Éric Gagné; 17 Kazuhisa Ishii; 59 Guillermo Mota; 45 Terry Mulholland; 10 Hideo Nomo; 47 Jesse Orosco; 45 Odalis Pérez; 44 Paul Quantrill; 52 Paul Shuey; 56 Dennis Springer; 54 Jeff Williams	Catchers: 21 Chad Kreuter; 16 Paul Lo Duca; 40 David Ross; Infielders: 29 Adrián Beltré; 13 Alex Cora; 8 Mark Grudzielanek; 25 Dave Hansen; 5 Tyler Houston; 3 César Izturis; 23 Eric Karros; 14 Jeff Reboulet; 41 Joe Thurston	Outfielders: 49 Luke Allen; 26 Hiram Bocachica; 50 Jolbert Cabrera; 52 Chin-Feng Chen; 15 Shawn Green; 9 Marquis Grissom; 33 Brian Jordan; 7 Mike Kinkade; 30 Dave Roberts; 26 Wilkin Ruan	Manager: 12 Jim Tracy; Coaches: 22 Jack Clark (hitting); 48 Jim Colborn (pitching); 35 Glenn Hoffman (third base); 18 Jim Lett (bullpen); 11 Manny Mota; 5 Jim Riggleman (bench); 31 John Shelby (1st base)

== Starting Pitchers stats ==
Note: G = Games pitched; GS = Games started; IP = Innings pitched; W/L = Wins/Losses; ERA = Earned run average; BB = Walks allowed; SO = Strikeouts; CG = Complete games

Name	G	GS	IP	W/L	ERA	BB	SO	CG
Odalis Pérez	32	32	222.1	15-10	3.00	38	155	4
Hideo Nomo	34	34	220.1	16-6	3.39	101	193	0
Andy Ashby	30	30	181.2	9-13	3.91	65	107	0
Omar Daal	39	23	161.1	11-9	3.90	54	105	0
Kazuhisa Ishii	28	28	154.0	14-10	4.27	106	143	0
Kevin Brown	17	10	63.2	3-4	4.81	23	58	0

== Relief Pitchers stats ==
Note: G = Games pitched; GS = Games started; IP = Innings pitched; W/L = Wins/Losses; ERA = Earned run average; BB = Walks allowed; SO = Strikeouts; SV = Saves

Name	G	GS	IP	W/L	ERA	BB	SO	SV
Éric Gagné	77	0	82.1	4-1	1.97	16	114	52
Paul Quantrill	86	0	76.2	5-4	2.70	25	53	1
Giovanni Carrara	63	0	90.2	6-3	3.28	32	56	1
Jesse Orosco	56	0	27.0	1-2	3.00	12	22	1
Guillermo Mota	43	0	60.2	1-3	4.15	27	49	0
Terry Mulholland	21	0	32.0	0-0	7.31	7	17	0
Paul Shuey	28	0	30.2	5-2	4.40	21	24	1
Kevin Beirne	12	3	29.0	2-0	3.41	17	17	0
Víctor Álvarez	4	0	10.1	0-1	4.35	2	7	0
Jeff Williams	10	0	10.0	0-0	11.70	7	11	0
Robert Ellis	3	0	2.2	0-1	10.13	0	0	0
Dennis Springer	1	0	1.1	0-1	6.75	2	1	0
Bryan Corey	1	0	1.0	0-0	0.00	0	0	0

== Batting Stats ==
Note: Pos = Position; G = Games played; AB = At bats; Avg. = Batting average; R = Runs scored; H = Hits; HR = Home runs; RBI = Runs batted in; SB = Stolen bases

Name	Pos	G	AB	Avg.	R	H	HR	RBI	SB
Paul Lo Duca	C/1B	149	580	.281	74	163	10	64	3
Chad Kreuter	C	41	95	.263	8	25	2	12	1
David Ross	C	8	10	.200	2	2	1	2	0
Eric Karros	1B	142	524	.271	52	142	13	73	4
Mark Grudzielanek	2B	150	536	.271	56	145	9	50	4
César Izturis	SS	135	439	.232	43	102	1	31	7
Adrián Beltré	3B	159	587	.257	70	151	21	75	7
Alex Cora	2B/SS	115	258	.291	37	75	5	28	7
Dave Hansen	1B/3B	96	120	.292	15	35	2	17	1
Tyler Houston	1B/3B	35	65	.200	9	13	0	8	0
Jeff Reboulet	2B/SS	38	48	.208	3	10	0	2	0
Joe Thurston	2B	8	13	.462	1	6	0	1	0
Shawn Green	RF	158	582	.285	110	166	42	114	8
Dave Roberts	CF/LF	127	422	.277	63	117	3	34	48
Brian Jordan	LF/RF	128	471	.285	65	134	18	80	2
Marquis Grissom	CF/LF/RF	111	343	.277	57	95	17	60	5
Hiram Bocachica	LF/CF/RF	49	65	.215	12	14	4	9	1
Mike Kinkade	LF/1B	37	50	.380	7	19	2	11	1
Jolbert Cabrera	OF/IF	10	12	.333	3	4	0	1	0
Wilkin Ruan	CF	12	11	.273	2	3	0	23	0
Luke Allen	RF	6	7	.143	2	1	0	0	0
Chin-Feng Chen	LF	3	5	.000	1	0	0	0	0

== 2002 Awards ==
- 2002 Major League Baseball All-Star Game
  - Éric Gagné reserve
  - Odalis Pérez reserve
- NL Pitcher of the Month
  - Éric Gagné (June 2002)
- NL Player of the Month
  - Brian Jordan (September 2002)
- NL Player of the Week
  - Odalis Pérez (April 15–21)
  - Shawn Green (May 20–26)

== Farm system ==
Level	Team	League	Manager
AAA	Las Vegas 51s	Pacific Coast League	Brad Mills
AA	Jacksonville Suns	Southern League	Dino Ebel
High A	Vero Beach Dodgers	Florida State League	Juan Bustabad
A	South Georgia Waves	South Atlantic League	Scott Little
**Rookie**	**Great Falls Dodgers**	**Pioneer League**	**Dann Bilardello**
Rookie	Gulf Coast Dodgers	Gulf Coast League	Luis Salazar
Rookie	DSL Dodgers; DSL Dodgers 2	Dominican Summer League	
Rookie	San Joaquin Dodgers	Venezuelan Summer League	

Teams in BOLD won League Championships

== Major League Baseball draft ==
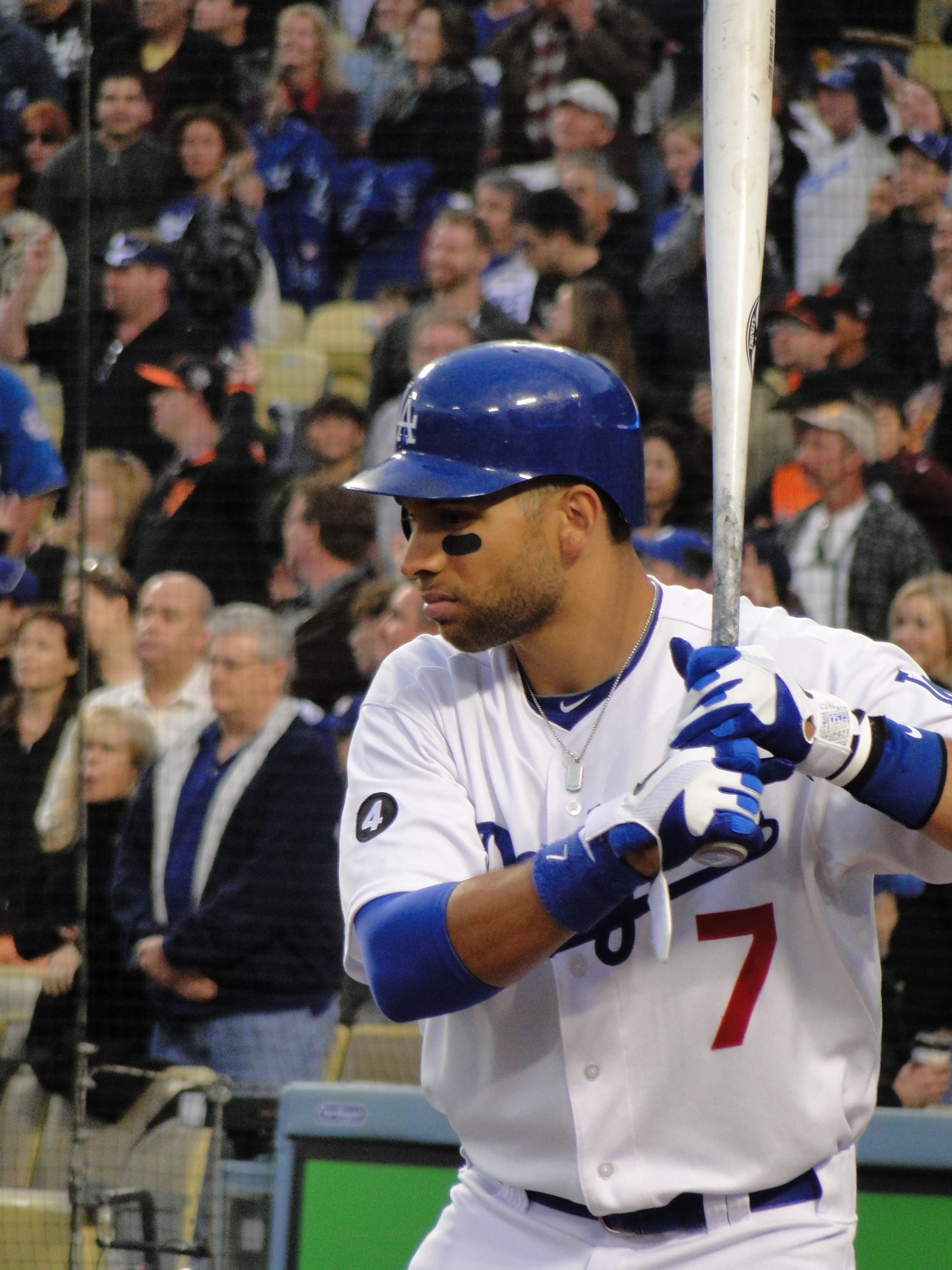
James Loney

The Dodgers selected 52 players in this draft. Of those, nine of them would eventually play Major League baseball. They gained a supplemental first round pick and an extra second round pick as compensation for losing pitcher Chan Ho Park to the Texas Rangers as a free agent.

With their first round pick, the Dodgers selected first baseman James Loney from Lawrence E Elkins High School in Missouri City, Texas. Loney would make it to the Majors in 2006 and was the Dodgers primary starting first baseman until he was traded in 2012. He hit 71 home runs and drove in 451 RBI in his seven seasons with the Dodgers, while hitting .284. The supplemental first round pick was left handed pitcher Greg Miller from Esperanza High School in Anaheim, California. Miller was a highly touted prospect and the 2003 Dodgers minor league pitcher of the year after he went 11–4 with a 2.49 ERA in 21 starts for the Vero Beach Dodgers. However, he missed the entire 2004 season with an arm injury and was never able to regain his touch. In eight minor league seasons (the last in the independent American Association) he was 24–15 with a 3.89 ERA in 221 games (53 starts).

This was a fairly successful draft, after several sub-par drafts that proceeded it. Also drafted this season were relief pitcher Jonathan Broxton (second round), starting pitchers James McDonald (11th round, drafted as a first baseman) and Eric Stults (15th round) and catcher Russell Martin (17th round, drafted as a second baseman).

2002 draft picks

Round	Name	Position	School	Signed	Career span	Highest level
1	James Loney	1B	Lawrence E Elkins High School	Yes	2002–2019	**MLB**
1s	Greg Miller	LHP	Esperanza High School	Yes	2002–2013	AAA
2	Zach Hammes	RHP	Iowa City High School	Yes	2002–2013	AAA
2	Jonathan Broxton	RHP	Burke County High School	Yes	2002–2017	**MLB**
3	Mike Nixon	C	Sunnyslope High School	Yes	2002–2005	AAA
4	Delwyn Young	2B	Santa Barbara City College	Yes	2002–2016	**MLB**
5	Mike Megrew	LHP	Chariho High School	Yes	2002–2008	AAA
6	Marshal Looney	LHP	La Pine High School	Yes	2002–2005	A
7	David Bagley	3B	University of California, San Diego	Yes	2002–2004	A+
8	Jamaal Hamilton	LHP	Monterey High School	Yes	2002–2005	AA
9	Denver Kitch	SS	University of Oklahoma	No; Orioles-2004	2004–2007	A
10	Ryan Williams	RHP	Old Dominion University	Yes	2002–2003	A+
11	James McDonald	1B	Polytechnic High School	Yes	2002–2013	**MLB**
12	Ryan Owen	C	Wichita State University	Yes	2002–2005	A
13	Julio LaSalle	RHP	Palm Beach Atlantic University	Yes	2002–2004	A
14	Karl Mejholm	RHP	Dover Bay High School	No		
15	Eric Stults	LHP	Bethel College	Yes	2002–2015	**MLB**
16	Sambu Ndungidi	OF	St. Georges High School	Yes	2003–2008	Rookie
17	Russell Martin	2B	Chipola College	Yes	2002–2019	**MLB**
18	Curtis Hudson	C	Yuba City High School	No		
19	Mike White	LHP	St. Petersburg College	Yes	2002–2005	A-
20	Andrew Walker	RHP	Cowley County Community College	No		
21	Brian Tracy	RHP	Claremont High School	No		
22	Brett Wayne	SS	St. Mary's College of California	Yes	2002–2007	AA
23	Joshua Bartusick	1B	Fountain Valley High School	No		
24	D. J. Jackson	OF	Jesuit High School	Yes	2003–2006	AAA
25	Alvin Hayes	RHP	Alabama Southern Community College	Yes	2003–2006	A-
26	Jarod Plummer	RHP	South Garland High School	Yes	2002–2010	AAA
27	Mike Potoczny	RHP	North Marion High School	Yes	2002–2003	Rookie
28	Robert Ray	RHP	Lufkin High School	No; Blue Jays-2005	2005–2012	**MLB**
29	Don Laurin	SS	East Oklahoma State College	Yes	2003–2006	A+
30	Edward Roberts	RHP	Key West High School	No		
31	Ross Hawley	RHP	Kansas State University	Yes	2002–2003	A
32	Richie Robnett	OF	Santa Barbara City College	No; Athletics-2004	2004–2010	AAA
33	Eduardo Baez	RHP	Poly High School	No		
34	Doug Mathis	RHP	Show Low High School	No; Rangers-2005	2005–2014	**MLB**
35	Matt Long	RHP	Granville High School	No; White Sox-2006	2006–2011	AAA
36	Bryan Goelz	OF	New York City College of Technology	Yes	2002–2012	A+
37	Jonathan Riggleman	3B	Hillsborough Community College	No		
38	Daiel Forrer	LHP	Jefferson Davis High School	No; Pirates-2007	2007	A-
39	Luke Hochevar	RHP	Fowler High School	No; Royals-2006	2006–2016	**MLB**
40	Eric Wolfe	1B	York Mills High School	No		
41	Ryan Lennerton	P	East Oklahoma State College	No		
42	Nathan Warrick	OF	Belton High School	No; Astros-2005	2005–2007	A
43	David Parker	RHP	Oklahoma City University	Yes	2002–2005	Rookie
44	James Bailie	C	Kodiak High School	No		
45	Justin Estrada	SS	Jesuit High School	No		
46	Mickey Jordan	OF	Armstrong Atlantic State University	Yes	2002	Rookie
47	Chad Bailey	LHP	North Idaho College	Yes	2003–2006	A+
48	Andre Trahan	OF	Yuba Community College	No		
49	Jeffrey Cristy	C	Lincoln Southeast High School	No		
50	Jason Farrand	C	Conway High School	No		
