= Paul Lo Duca =

American baseball player (born 1972)

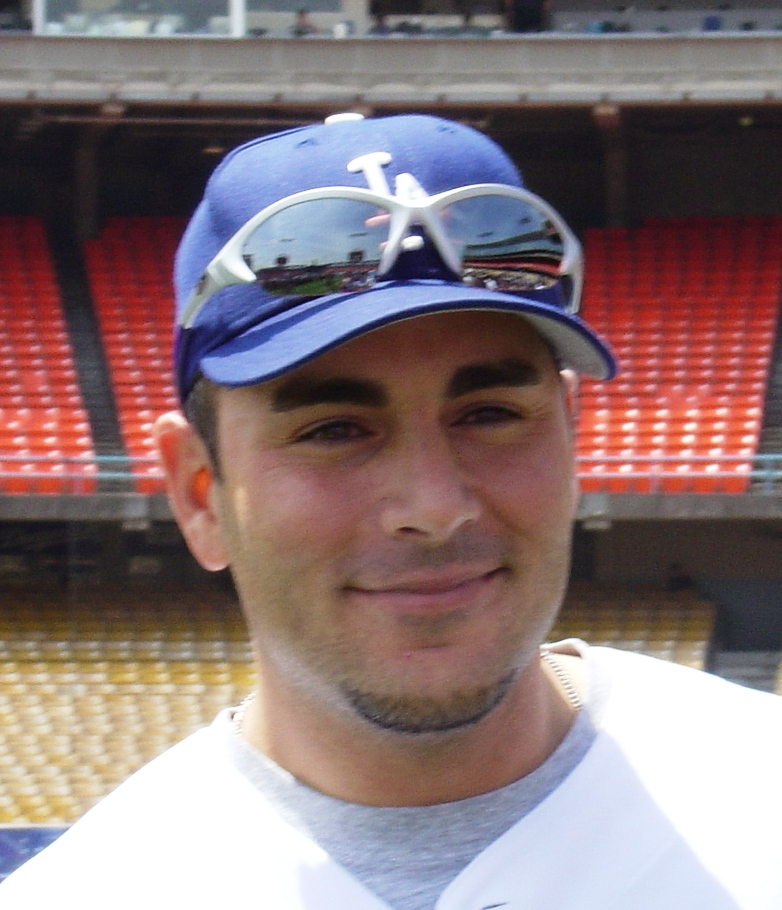
- Lo Duca with the Los Angeles Dodgers
- Catcher
- Born: April 12, 1972 (age 54); Brooklyn, New York, U.S.
- Batted: Right Threw: Right

MLB debut
- June 21, 1998, for the Los Angeles Dodgers

Last MLB appearance
- September 27, 2008, for the Florida Marlins

MLB statistics
- Batting average: .286
- Home runs: 80
- Runs batted in: 481
- Stats at Baseball Reference

Teams
- Los Angeles Dodgers (1998–2004); Florida Marlins (2004–2005); New York Mets (2006–2007); Washington Nationals (2008); Florida Marlins (2008)

Career highlights and awards
- 4× All-Star (2003–2006)

Paul Anthony Lo Duca (born April 12, 1972) is an American former professional baseball player and television personality. He played in Major League Baseball (MLB) as a catcher for the Los Angeles Dodgers (1998–2004), Florida Marlins (2004–2005, 2008), New York Mets (2006–2007), and Washington Nationals (2008). He later became a horse racing analyst for the TVG Network and New York Racing Association. In November 2019, he agreed to a contract to work for Barstool Sports as a horse racing and gambling analyst.

== Collegiate career ==
Prior to his collegiate career, Lo Duca attended Apollo High School in Glendale, Arizona where he was named Co-Player of the Year in 1990. As a result, he walked on to the baseball team at Glendale Community College in Arizona after he was not recruited or drafted out of high school. He hit .449 and .461 in his two years at the community college before transferring to Arizona State University. In 1993 (the one year he played at ASU), Lo Duca was named The Sporting News Player of the Year, setting school records with a .446 batting average and 129 hits. He also was named a finalist for the Golden Spikes Award, and his 37-game hitting streak is the second longest in school history. He was named ASU "On Deck Circle" Most Valuable Player; other winners include Dustin Pedroia, Willie Bloomquist, Ike Davis, and Barry Bonds.

== Professional career ==
=== Los Angeles Dodgers ===
Despite his college success, Lo Duca spent many years in the minor leagues after being drafted in the 25th round of the 1993 Major League Baseball draft. After spending 1995 with the Vero Beach Dodgers, Lo Duca was sent to the Australian Baseball League to play with the Dodgers' Australian affiliate, the Adelaide Giants, during the 1995–96 off-season, to help with his development. He finally achieved a breakthrough year with the Los Angeles Dodgers in 2001 at age 29, recording career highs of 25 home runs, 90 RBIs and a .320 batting average. Lo Duca drew comparisons to Dodgers predecessors Mike Scioscia and Mike Piazza; all three were capable and popular everyday catchers who were homegrown through the Dodgers' organization, and all three are of Italian-American ancestry. Lo Duca's primary strength was as a contact hitter, like Scioscia, but unlike the power-hitting Piazza.

After becoming an everyday big league player, Lo Duca was named to four All-Star Games. In 2002, he was one of the best contact hitters in the majors — only Jason Kendall struck out less often, and no one had a better percentage of swings and misses. In 2003, Lo Duca's 25-game hitting streak was the second longest in Dodgers history, and defensively, he ranked first in the National League in throwing out baserunners. In 2004, he led National League catchers in RBIs. In the field in 2004, he allowed 93 stolen bases, more than any other catcher in Major League Baseball.

=== Florida Marlins ===
Lo Duca was traded from Los Angeles along with Juan Encarnación and Guillermo Mota to the Marlins for Hee-seop Choi, Brad Penny, and minor league pitching prospect Bill Murphy at the 2004 trading deadline.

=== New York Mets ===
Later, Lo Duca was traded to the Mets for two minor league prospects: pitcher Gaby Hernandez and outfielder Dante Brinkley. This was part of a Marlin "market correction" where most of their high-paid players were traded away after the 2005 season. Lo Duca was a member of the 2006 All-Star Team, and the Mets finished that year with a 97-65 record and made the postseason (his first playoff experience). Lo Duca hit .318, his highest average since 2001. He also had a .355 on-base percentage, a career high. Lo Duca collected his 1,000th career hit on May 30, 2007, off Barry Zito. His batting average fell 48 points that year to .272, and he played only 119 games after making a trip to the disabled list in August.

=== Washington Nationals ===
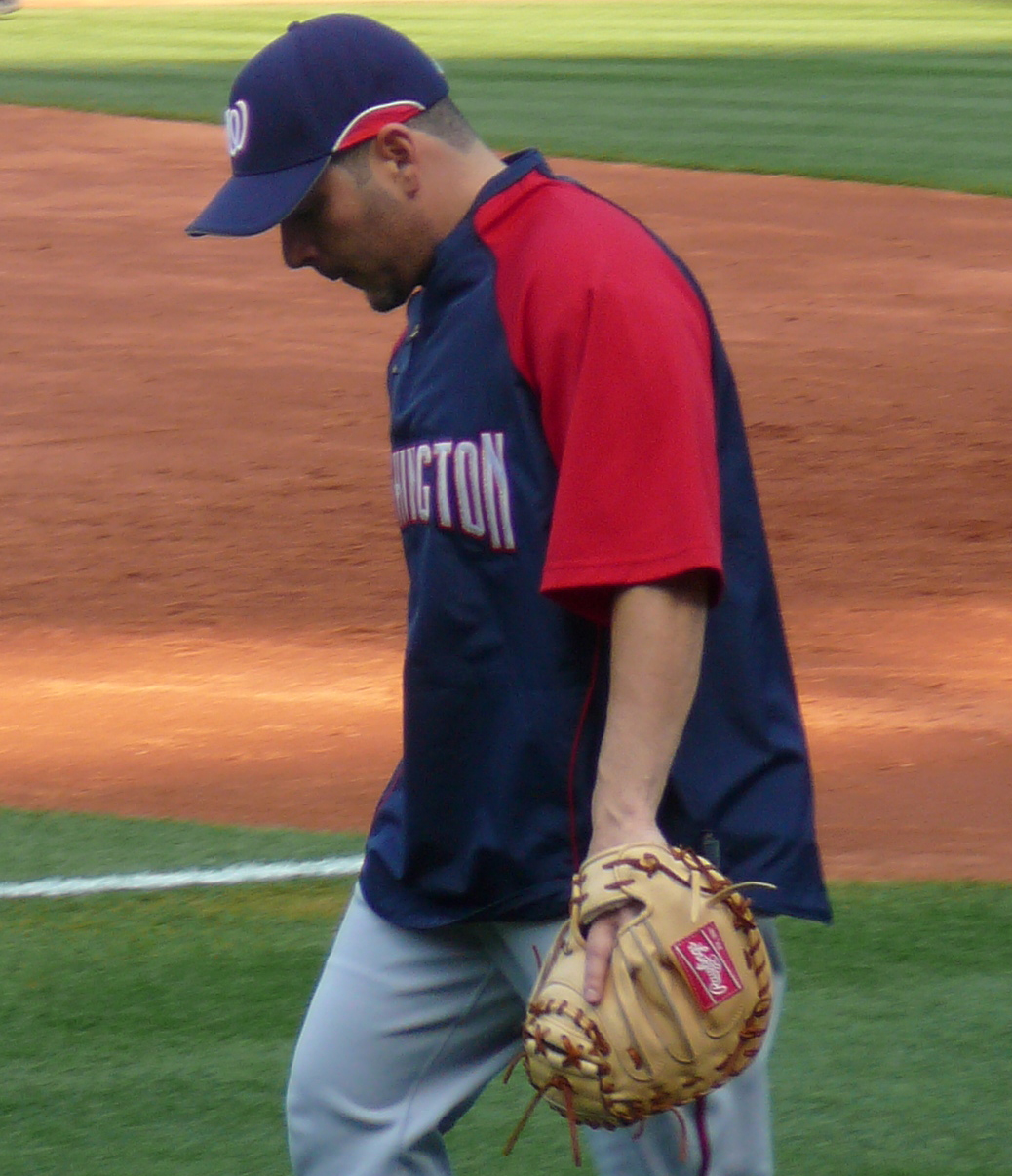
Lo Duca with the Nationals in 2008.

After the 2007 season, Lo Duca agreed to a $5 million, one-year deal with the Washington Nationals on December 10, 2007. He was released by the Nationals on July 31, 2008, after batting .230/.301/.281.

=== Florida Marlins (second stint) ===
On August 8, 2008, Lo Duca signed a minor league contract to return to the Florida Marlins organization. LoDuca was called up by the Marlins on August 16.

=== Retirement ===
Lo Duca became a free agent after the 2008 season and did not play in 2009. In June 2009, he joined TVG Network as an analyst and began working on 2009 Belmont Stakes day.

=== Colorado Rockies ===
On January 19, 2010, Lo Duca signed with the Colorado Rockies and came out of retirement. He only appeared in the minor leagues with the Triple-A Colorado Springs Sky Sox during his stint in the Rockies organization, batting .233/.292/.302.

=== Second retirement ===
On May 29, 2010, Lo Duca was released, and in June, he returned to work for TVG. He continues to work as a horse racing analyst for the network.

=== Defamation lawsuit ===
On October 22, 2019, MLB umpire Joe West filed a defamation lawsuit in New York against Lo Duca and Action Network over comments Lo Duca made on a podcast in April 2019, recalling his Mets teammate Billy Wagner telling him, "Joe loves antique cars so every time he comes into town I lend him my ’57 Chevy so he can drive it around so then he opens up the strike zone for me." In the complaint, West denied this and said he suffered unspecified damages as a result of Lo Duca's comments. Analysis of MLB records indicated that West was the home plate umpire for a single Mets game during the two seasons that Lo Duca and Wagner were teammates in New York, but Wagner did not pitch in that particular game. West was awarded a $500,000 judgment by the court.

== Mitchell Report ==
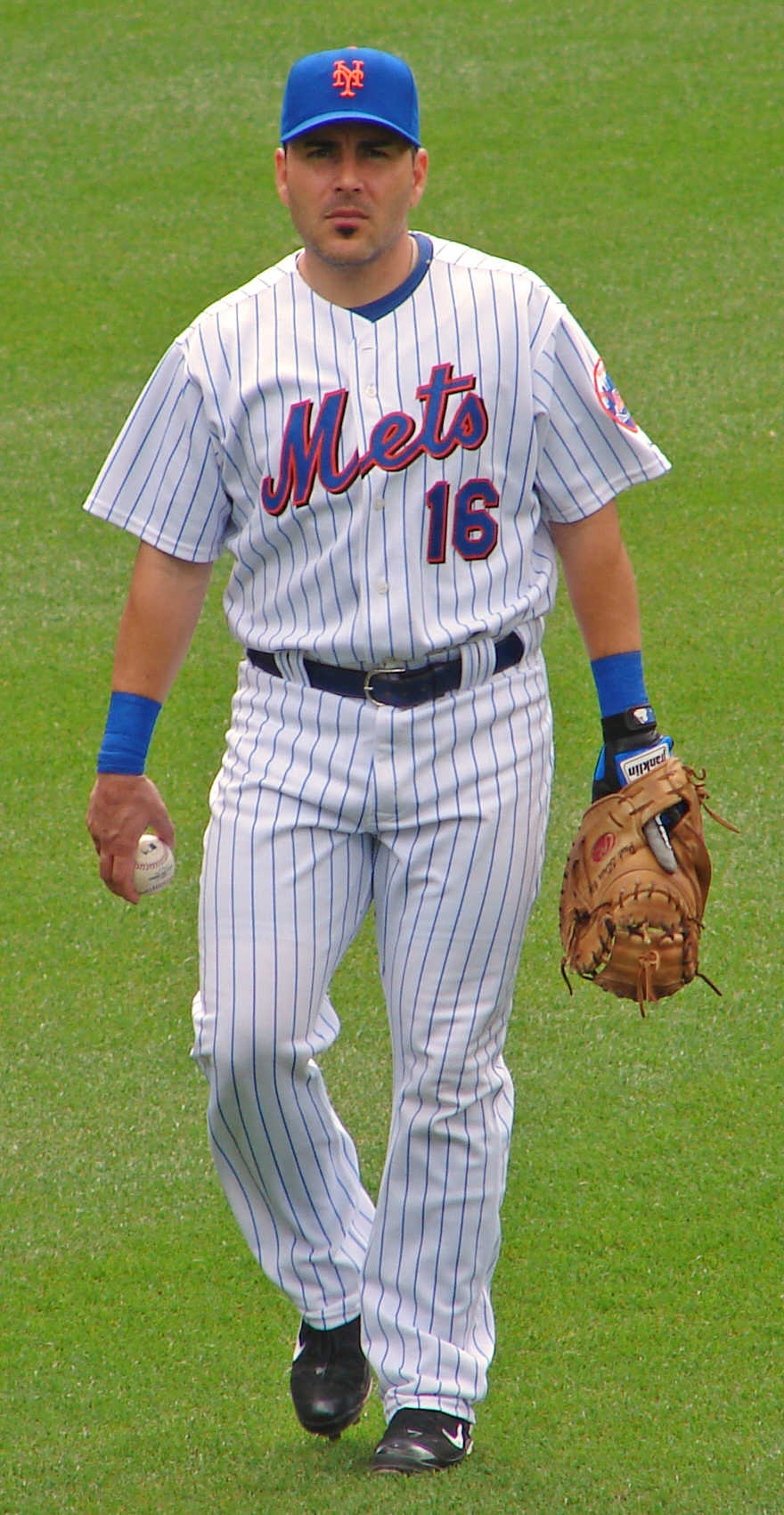
Lo Duca with the Mets

On December 13, 2007, Lo Duca was named in the Mitchell Report in connection with human growth hormone use. Lo Duca allegedly received the hormone HGH from former Mets clubhouse attendant and steroids dealer Kirk Radomski, who produced three checks from Lo Duca totaling $3,200. Federal investigators also seized handwritten notes from Lo Duca to Radomski during a search of Radomski's house. The report also claims that Lo Duca introduced several other baseball players to Radomski, including Adam Riggs, Kevin Brown, Éric Gagné, and Matt Herges.

The Mitchell Report cites an October 2003 meeting among Dodgers officials that included discussion of the possible use of steroids by some players. The notes of the meeting say:

Steroids aren't being used anymore on him. Big part of this. Might have some value to trade ... Florida might have interest. ... Got off the steroids ... Took away a lot of hard line drives. ... Can get comparable value back would consider trading. ... If you do trade him, will get back on the stuff and try to show you he can have a good year. That's his makeup. Comes to play. Last year of contract, playing for 05.

Six months later, the Dodgers traded Lo Duca to the Florida Marlins. Mitchell did not identify the Dodgers officials involved, nor if other players were traded because they stopped taking steroids.

On January 9, 2013, in response to the Baseball Hall of Fame announcement in which no players were elected, Lo Duca acknowledged his steroids use, tweeting "I took PEDs and I'm not proud of it...but people who think you can take a shot or a pill and play like the legends on that ballot need help."

== Personal life ==
Lo Duca was born in Brooklyn, New York, but was raised in Glendale, Arizona, and attended Apollo High School, after attending St Simon and Jude Middle School. On August 7, 2006, the New York media leaked a story about his divorce suit with his wife, Sonia (Flores) Lo Duca, a former Playboy model. The leak by the New York Post led Lo Duca to threaten to stop giving interviews to the media. Lo Duca had been "one of the most helpful and available players in the Mets clubhouse", and afterward resumed giving interviews, as long as they pertained to baseball. Lo Duca has a daughter, Bella Lucia, with his ex-wife. Lo Duca is a TV analyst and handicapper in the horseracing industry, currently working on the Saratoga Live telecast.

In February of 2025, the New York Post reported that Lo Duca had recently been in a “bad accident” resulting in “multiple fractures.” The injuries were so severe that Lo Duca was left unable to eat for a "couple weeks."

== See also ==
- List of Major League Baseball players named in the Mitchell Report
- List of Major League Baseball single-game hits leaders
