= Víctor Álvarez (baseball) =

Mexican baseball player (born 1976)

- Starting pitcher
- Born: November 8, 1976 (age 49); Culiacán, Sinaloa, Mexico
- Batted: Left Threw: Left

MLB debut
- July 30, 2002, for the Los Angeles Dodgers

Last MLB appearance
- August 26, 2003, for the Los Angeles Dodgers

MLB statistics
- Win–loss record: 0–2
- Earned run average: 7.31
- Strikeouts: 10
- Stats at Baseball Reference

Teams
- Los Angeles Dodgers (2002–2003)
Medals
Men's baseball
Representing Mexico
Central American and Caribbean Games
Bronze medal – third place	2006 Cartagena	Team

Víctor Aurelio Álvarez (born November 8, 1976) is a Mexican former Major League Baseball pitcher. Álvarez was signed by the Los Angeles Dodgers as an undrafted free agent on May 16, 1997.

== Professional career ==
=== Los Angeles Dodgers ===
Álvarez began his professional career with the Rookie-level Great Falls Dodgers of the Pioneer League in 1997. He went 4–1 with a 3.35 ERA in 12 games, eight for starts. He did not pitch in the 1998 season.

In 1999 Álvarez split time between the Class-A Vero Beach Dodgers and the Double-A San Antonio Missions. He went 4–4 with a 1.97 ERA in 12 games, all for starts, at Vero Beach. With the Missions he went 4–3 with a 3.97 ERA in nine games, all for starts.

Álvarez split the 2000 season with Vero Beach, San Antonio and also the Diablos Rojos del México. He was 1–1 with Vero Beach and 0–3 with the Missions before the Dodgers loaned him to Mexico City. There he went 0–2 with a 6.33 ERA in seven games, six for starts.

He split the 2001 season between the Double-A Jacksonville Suns and the Triple-A Las Vegas Stars. With the Suns he went 2–0 in eight starts with an impressive 1.20 ERA. He was soon called up the Starts where he went 7–4 with a 4.27 ERA in 20 starts.

In 2002 he split the season between the Triple-A Las Vegas 51s and the Dodgers. With the 51s he was 10–7 with a 4.70 ERA in 34 games, 15 for starts. He made his major league debut on July 30, 2002, against the Cincinnati Reds, working 1.1 innings of relief and giving up 2 runs. He pitched in four games for the Dodgers in 2002 going 0–1 with a 4.36 ERA in one start.

Álvarez primarily played for Las Vegas in 2003 but did have a short stint with the Dodgers. With the 51s he went 4–4 with a 2.70 ERA in 22 games, seven for starts. With L.A. he went 0–1 with a dismal 12.72 ERA in five games, all in relief.

=== Philadelphia Phillies ===
He was claimed on waivers by the Philadelphia Phillies after the 2003 season, but cut after spring training.

=== Mexican League ===
Álvarez began to play for the Diablos Rojos del México in 2005. He compiled a 5–2 record in 18 games, 16 for starts, in the 2005 season.

In 2006 he went 8–4 with a 4.27 ERA in 20 games, all for starts, with the Diablos Rojos.

He had a rocky 2007 season but bounced back with an impressive 2008. In 2007, he went 12–5 with a 5.41 ERA in 22 starts and in 2008 he went 9–5 with a 3.43 ERA in 19 starts.

He began the 2009 season with the Diablos Rojos, but moved on to the Guerreros de Oaxaca after just one game. He started 2010 back with the Guerreros, and later pitched for Veracruz.

=== Mexican Pacific League ===
Álvarez spent fourteen seasons playing in the Mexican Pacific League (LMP), making his debut in the 1997–98 season with the Cañeros de Los Mochis. He also played for the Tomateros de Culiacán, Algodoneros de Guasave, Águilas de Mexicali and Naranjeros de Hermosillo.
