= Matt Herges =

American baseball player & coach (born 1970)

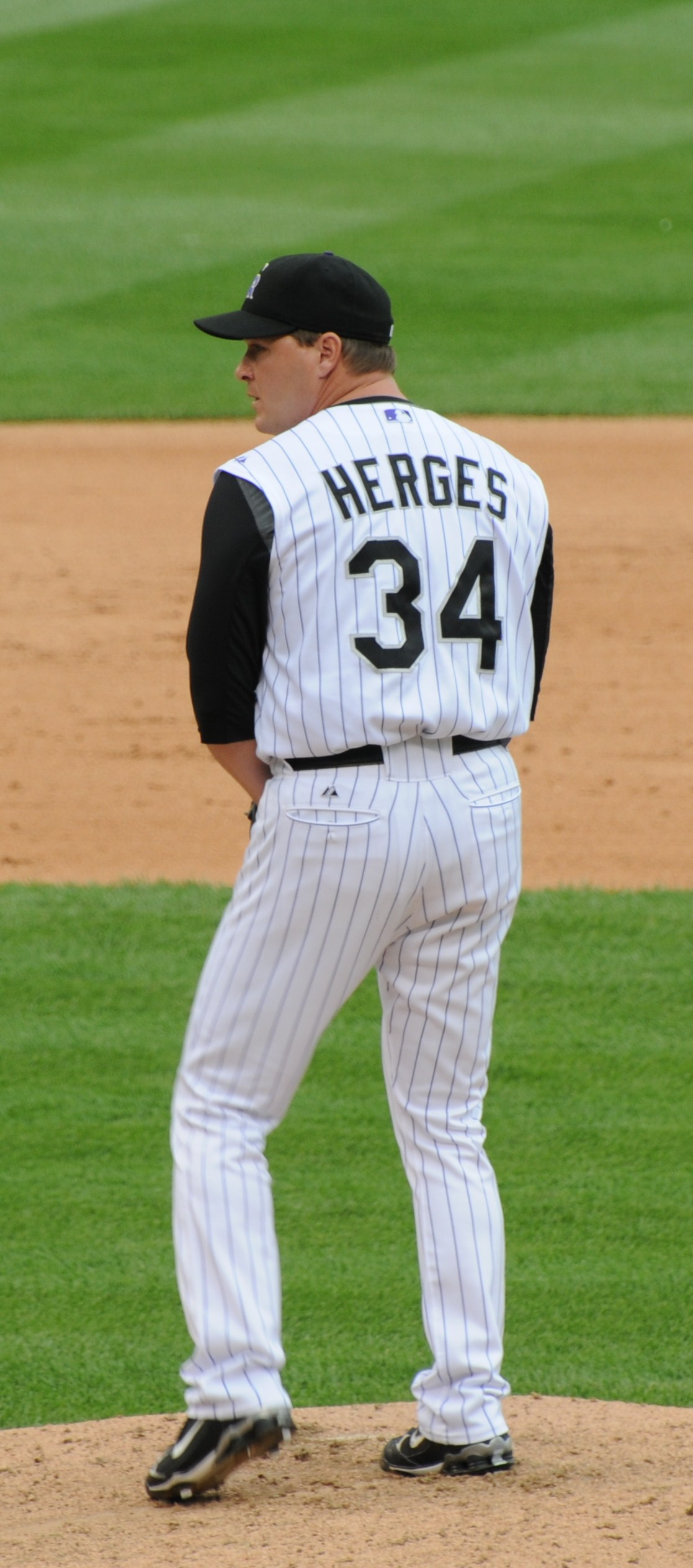
- Herges with the Rockies in 2008
- Pitcher
- Born: April 1, 1970 (age 56); Champaign, Illinois, U.S.
- Batted: Left Threw: Right

MLB debut
- August 3, 1999, for the Los Angeles Dodgers

Last MLB appearance
- October 4, 2009, for the Colorado Rockies

MLB statistics
- Win–loss record: 43–35
- Earned run average: 3.91
- Strikeouts: 473
- Stats at Baseball Reference

Teams
- Los Angeles Dodgers (1999–2001); Montreal Expos (2002); San Diego Padres (2003); San Francisco Giants (2003–2005); Arizona Diamondbacks (2005); Florida Marlins (2006); Colorado Rockies (2007–2008); Cleveland Indians (2009); Colorado Rockies (2009)

Matthew Tyler Herges (born April 1, 1970) is an American former professional baseball relief pitcher who played in Major League Baseball (MLB) from 1999 to 2009, and is the former pitching coach for the Arizona Diamondbacks.

Herges played in MLB for the Los Angeles Dodgers, Montreal Expos, San Diego Padres, San Francisco Giants, Arizona Diamondbacks, Florida Marlins, Colorado Rockies, and Cleveland Indians. He is one of only two players, along with Steve Finley, to play for all five National League West teams. He is an alumnus of Illinois State University and is the brother-in-law of former Major League Baseball player Todd Hollandsworth.

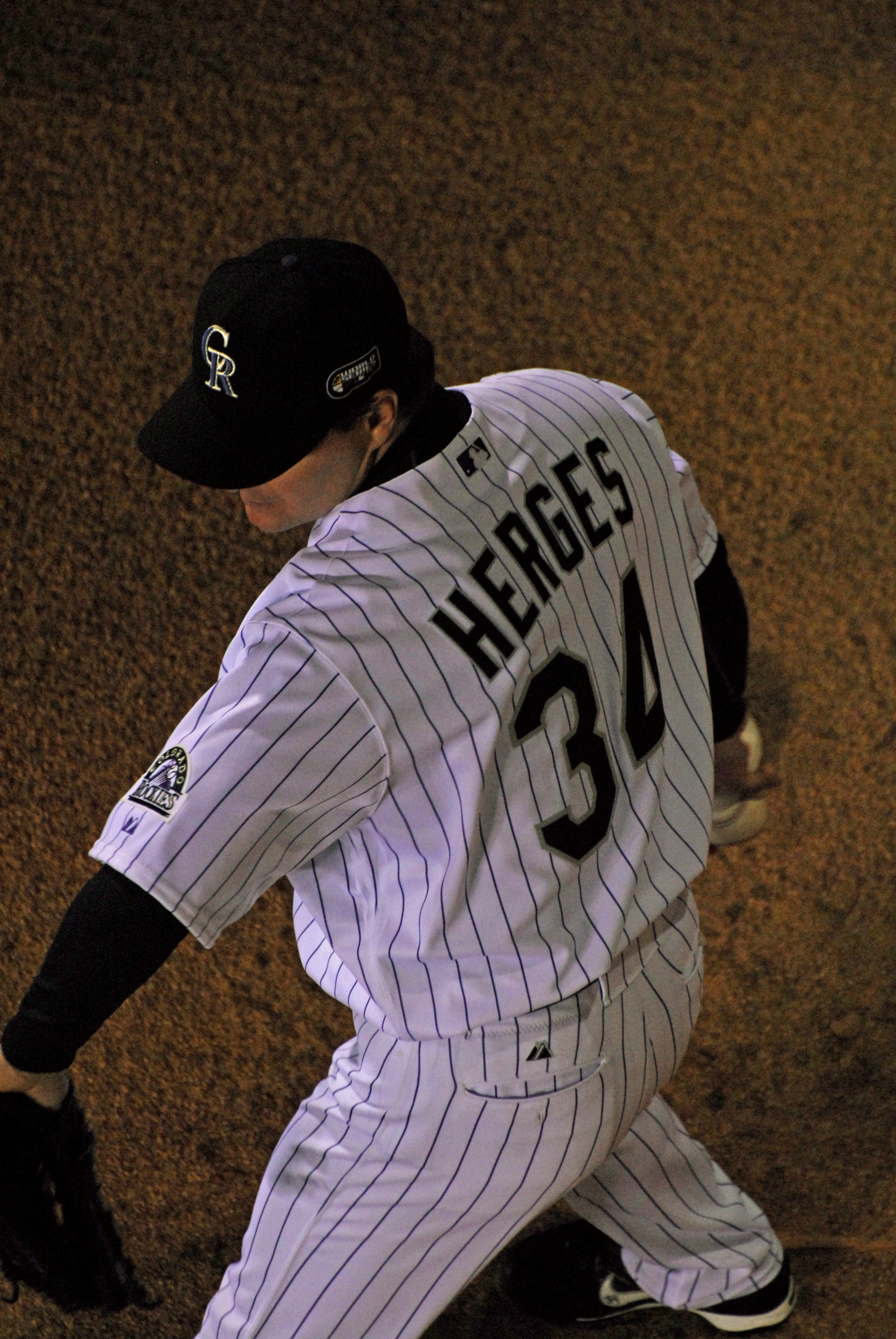
Herges warming up in the bullpen

== Career ==
=== Amateur ===
A native of Champaign, Illinois, Herges attended Champaign Centennial High School and Illinois State. In 1990, he played collegiate summer baseball with the Brewster Whitecaps of the Cape Cod Baseball League.

=== Los Angeles Dodgers ===
Herges was signed by the Los Angeles Dodgers as an amateur free agent in 1992. He began his career with the Yakima Bears in 1992, then played with the Bakersfield Dodgers (1993) and Vero Beach Dodgers (1994).

Herges went to spring training as a replacement player in 1995 when the Major League Baseball Players' Association was on strike. As a result, he was barred from membership in the Association for the rest of his career, depriving him of certain revenue sharing sources available to other players.

Herges remained in the Dodgers farm system after the strike, playing for the San Bernardino Spirit (1995), San Antonio Missions (1995–1996) and Albuquerque Dukes (1996–1999).

He also played with the Adelaide Giants in the Australian Baseball League during the 1999 off-season.

Herges made his Major League Baseball debut later that year with the Dodgers on August 3 against the Houston Astros, allowing 1 unearned run in 1.2 innings of relief. He only played in 17 games in 1999 but became a full-time member of the Dodgers bullpen the next season. He picked up his first win on April 21, 2000, against the Cincinnati Reds and went on to win his first 8 decisions. His first loss was on August 7 against the Chicago Cubs, his first game as a starting pitcher.

Between 1999 and 2001, he appeared in 151 games for the Dodgers, including starting 4 games in 2000. He posted a 20–13 record and a 3.38 ERA.

Herges went into spring training in 2002 expecting to be the Dodgers closer after the retirement of Jeff Shaw. However, he pitched poorly in spring training games, with some speculating that it was due to the Dodgers failure to sign him to a contract extension. He wound up losing the role to converted starter Éric Gagné.

=== Montreal Expos ===
The Dodgers traded Herges to the Montreal Expos on March 23, 2002, in exchange for Guillermo Mota and Wilkin Ruan. He pitched in 62 games for the Expos, with a 2–5 record and 4.04 ERA with 6 saves.

=== San Diego Padres ===
Herges was traded by the Expos to the Pittsburgh Pirates on December 20, 2002, for Chris Young. However the Pirates released him on March 26, 2003, after he was unable to win a roster spot in spring training. The San Diego Padres signed him as a free agent a few days later, on April 1. He pitched in 40 games with the Padres, with a 2–2 record and 2.86 ERA.

=== San Francisco Giants ===
Herges was traded by the Padres to the San Francisco Giants on July 13, 2003, for Clay Hensley and cash. He pitched with the Giants for parts of 3 seasons. He was the primary setup man for most of that time, but also picked up 23 saves in 2004 when he filled in at closer for the injured Robb Nen. He pitched in a total of 118 games for the Giants, with an ERA of 4.30 and a 6–6 record.

=== Arizona Diamondbacks ===
The Giants traded him to the Arizona Diamondbacks on June 3, 2005, in exchange for Doug DeVore. Herges appeared in just 7 games with the Diamondbacks and allowed 12 earned runs to score in 8 innings for a 13.50 ERA. He was promptly designated for assignment on June 18. He cleared waivers and reported to the AAA Tucson Sidewinders, where he appeared in 26 games the rest of the season with a 1–2 record and 3.14 ERA.

=== Florida Marlins ===
Herges became a free agent after the 2005 season and signed with the Florida Marlins. He appeared in 66 games for the Marlins, with a 2–3 record and 4.31 ERA.

=== Colorado Rockies ===
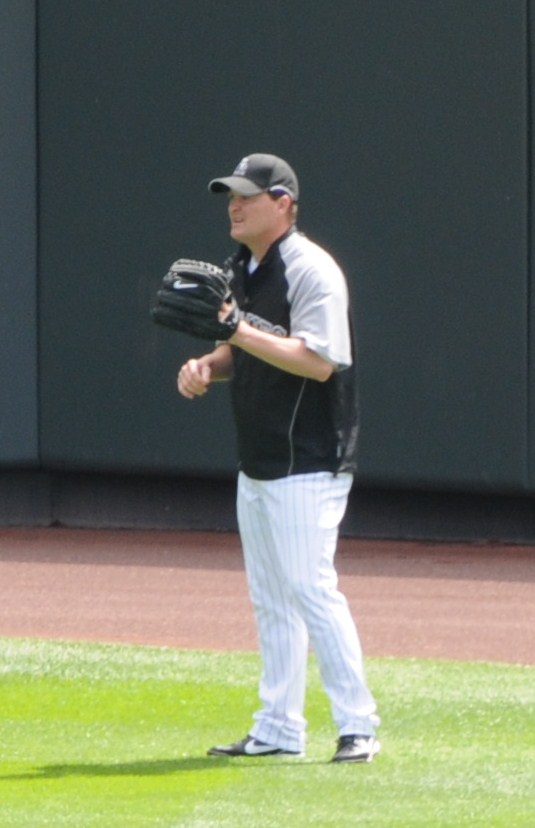
Herges warming up

Herges signed as a free agent with the Colorado Rockies on February 18, 2007. With this signing, he joined outfielder Steve Finley in being one of only two players in MLB history to play for every team within a five-team division. Herges has appeared for every team in the National League West. He tied this record on April 19, 2007.

He split the 2007 season between the Rockies and the Colorado Springs Sky Sox in AAA and then played the whole 2008 season with the Rockies. He appeared in the 2007 World Series as a member of the Rockies, pitching 3 1/3 scoreless innings in relief against the Boston Red Sox.

=== Cleveland Indians ===
He signed a minor league contract with the Cleveland Indians that contained a spring training invite on January 16, 2009. He began the season with the Columbus Clippers and was promoted to the Indians on May 6. In 21 games with the Indians, he was 2–1 with a 3.55 ERA before he was designated for assignment on July 4.

=== Return to the Colorado Rockies ===
After his release by the Indians, he re-signed with the Rockies to a minor league deal on July 20, 2009. He pitched in 13 games for Colorado Springs and another 9 for the Rockies.

=== Kansas City Royals ===
He signed as a minor league free agent with the Kansas City Royals on January 10, 2010. He did not play for the Royals but spent the entire season in AAA with the Omaha Royals, where he was 9–4 with a 4.63 ERA in 43 appearances and also started 5 games. He retired after the season.

== Coaching career ==
He was hired by the Los Angeles Dodgers as a minor league pitching instructor in 2011 and was the pitching coach for the Arizona League Dodgers. For 2012 he was promoted to be the pitching coach for the Class-A Rancho Cucamonga Quakes. After three seasons with the Quakes, he was promoted to be the pitching coach with the Double-A Tulsa Drillers of the Texas League. In 2016, Herges was promoted again, to the AAA Oklahoma City Dodgers of the Pacific Coast League. He was the bullpen coach for the San Francisco Giants in 2018 and 2019.

Herges was hired as the Arizona Diamondbacks pitching coach on October 31, 2019. He spent the 2020 and 2021 seasons with the team. In October 2021, the Diamondbacks announced that several coaches, including Herges, would not be retained.

== Steroid use ==
After he was mentioned in the Mitchell Report, Herges admitted that he had used steroids and human growth hormone during his career.

== See also ==
- List of Major League Baseball players named in the Mitchell Report
