= Wilkin Ruan =

Dominican baseball player (born 1978)

- Outfielder
- Born: September 18, 1978 (age 47); Ramon Santana, Dominican Republic
- Batted: Right Threw: Right

MLB debut
- September 1, 2002, for the Los Angeles Dodgers

Last MLB appearance
- September 28, 2003, for the Los Angeles Dodgers

MLB statistics
- Batting average: .231
- Home runs: 0
- Runs batted in: 5
- Stats at Baseball Reference

Teams
- Los Angeles Dodgers (2002–2003)

Wilkin Chal Ruan (born September 18, 1978) is a Dominican former Major League Baseball outfielder.

== Career ==
Known primarily for his speed, Ruan was signed as an undrafted free agent by the Montreal Expos on November 15, 1996. He hit .348 with 33 stolen bases for the Expos Dominican League team in 1997 before being brought to the states and placed in the Expos rookie ball team in 1998. Against more experienced U.S. pitchers he struggled slightly, hitting only .239 for the Gulf Coast Expos that season, though he still stole 13 bases.

With the Cape Fear Crocs in 1999 and 2000, he improved his average (.224, .287) each year and continued to steal bases at an amazing rate, swiping 64 bases in 2000. In 2001, he started at the Expos High-A team in Jupiter and hit .283 with 25 steals before being promoted to their Harrisburg Double-A team.

On March 23, 2002 he was traded by the Expos to the Los Angeles Dodgers along with pitcher Guillermo Mota for Jorge Nunez and Matt Herges. He started the 2002 season with the Dodgers Double-A team in Jacksonville where he hit .253 with 23 steals and finished the season with the Triple-A Las Vegas 51s where he hit .327 with 12 steals in 40 games. That earned him a September call-up to the Dodgers major league roster. He made his major league debut on September 1 as a pinch runner. He got his first major league hit the following day against the Arizona Diamondbacks. He was primarily used as a pinch runner during his month-long stay in the big leagues.

In 2003, he was the starting center fielder for the Las Vegas 51s all season, hitting .308 with a whopping 41 steals in 49 attempts. He had a couple of stints with the Dodgers in 2003 also, hitting .220 in limited opportunities.

However, he had a tough spring training in 2004 where he hit only .128 and wound up back in Jacksonville for the start of the season, hitting only .208 with 9 steals for the Suns, causing the Dodgers to release him on June 19, 2004.

On July 2, he was signed as a minor league free agent by the Kansas City Royals and sent to their Double-A team in Wichita where he rebounded slightly, hitting .276 with 11 steals. He remained at Wichita for the 2005 season, hitting .254 with 18 steals in somewhat limited playing time.

Released by the Royals after the 2005 season, he rejoined the Dodgers, signing to play once more with Jacksonville. He hit .260 with 18 steals as the starting center fielder for the Suns. In 2007, he again started the season with Jacksonville, but was called up to Las Vegas in June, where he remained for 2008. He became a free agent at the end of the season and signed a minor league contract with the Philadelphia Phillies on December 17, 2008.
