= Guillermo Mota =

Dominican baseball pitcher (born 1973)

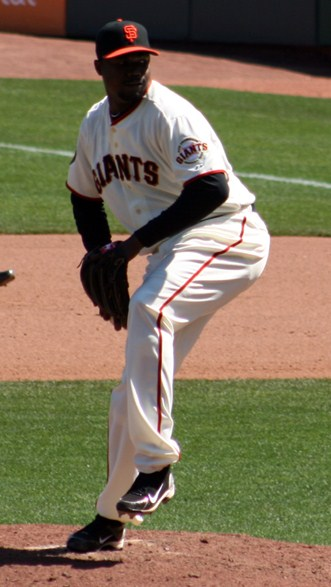
- Mota with the San Francisco Giants in 2011
- Pitcher
- Born: July 25, 1973 (age 53); San Pedro de Macorís, Dominican Republic
- Batted: Right Threw: Right

MLB debut
- May 2, 1999, for the Montreal Expos

Last MLB appearance
- October 2, 2012, for the San Francisco Giants

MLB statistics
- Win–loss record: 39–45
- Earned run average: 3.94
- Strikeouts: 696
- Stats at Baseball Reference

Teams
- Montreal Expos (1999–2001); Los Angeles Dodgers (2002–2004); Florida Marlins (2004–2005); Cleveland Indians (2006); New York Mets (2006–2007); Milwaukee Brewers (2008); Los Angeles Dodgers (2009); San Francisco Giants (2010–2012)

Career highlights and awards
- 2× World Series champion (2010, 2012)

Guillermo Reynoso Mota (born July 25, 1973) is a Dominican former professional baseball relief pitcher in Major League Baseball. In his career, he pitched for the Montreal Expos, Los Angeles Dodgers, Florida Marlins, Cleveland Indians, New York Mets, Milwaukee Brewers and San Francisco Giants. Mota is 6 feet 6 inches (1.98 m) tall and weighs 240 pounds (110 kg). He throws and bats right-handed. He throws three pitches: a fastball, a slider and a circle changeup.

Mota was originally signed by the New York Mets in 1990 as an infielder. After several years in their organization, he was drafted by the Montreal Expos in the Rule 5 draft in 1996 and converted into a pitcher in 1997. Mota had a 2.96 ERA in 1999, his rookie season, but he struggled in his next two seasons and was traded to the Los Angeles Dodgers prior to 2002. His struggles continued in his first year with the Dodgers, but Mota had a career year in 2003, as he had a 6–3 record with a 1.97 ERA in 76 games. He became the setup man to closer Éric Gagné in 2004, but was traded to the Florida Marlins midseason. Mota started 2005 as their closer, but Todd Jones took over the role when Mota got hurt in April. Following the year, Mota was traded to the Boston Red Sox.

Before Mota ever played for the Red Sox, however, he was traded again to the Cleveland Indians. He struggled in his time with the Indians in 2006 and was designated for assignment by them in August. The New York Mets acquired him, and Mota improved mightily upon joining them. Following the season, he became a free agent, but he again signed with the Mets. After struggling in 2007, he was traded to the Milwaukee Brewers. He got off to a poor start with Milwaukee in 2008 but improved in the second half. Following the season, Mota became a free agent and signed with the Dodgers again. He had his best year since 2004 and became a free agent again after the season. For the first time in his career, in 2010 he signed a minor league contract with the San Francisco Giants. After making the team out of spring training, Mota won his first career World Series despite struggling at times during the season. Following the season, he signed another minor league contract with the Giants and made the team out of spring training again. During the 2012 season, Mota became one of three players in league history to fail a drug test twice when it was shown he tested positive for Clenbuterol, a performance-enhancing drug.

== Early life ==
Mota was born on July 25, 1973, in San Pedro de Macorís, in the Dominican Republic. As a youth, he attended Jose Joaquin Perez High School. After high school, he was signed by the New York Mets on September 7, 1990, by scout Eddy Toledo.

== Professional career ==
=== Minor leagues ===
After two years playing baseball in the Dominican Republic, Mota was assigned to the rookie-league Gulf Coast League Mets in 1993 as a third baseman. He had a batting average of .249 with one home run and one stolen base and amassed a .934 fielding percentage in 43 games. The next season, he spent most of the year with the rookie-league Kingsport Mets of the Appalachian League, although he went hitless in four at bats in one game with the St. Lucie Mets of the single-A advanced Florida State League. With Kingsport, he batted .245 while he struck out 78 times in 245 at-bats.

In 1995, Mota was moved to the shortstop position and assigned to the single-A Capital City Bombers of the South Atlantic League. With the Bombers, he batted .243 and struck out 127 times in 400 at-bats while committing 40 errors at shortstop. In 1996, he returned to the St. Lucie Mets, where he batted .234 with 90 strikeouts in 304 at-bats while committing 21 errors. Following the season, he was selected by the Montreal Expos in the Rule 5 draft.

The Expos converted Mota to a pitcher in 1997 and assigned him to the Cape Fear Crocs of the South Atlantic League. Starting 23 of his 25 games for the Crocs, he had a 5–10 record with a 4.36 earned run average (ERA) and 112 strikeouts in 126 innings.

In 1998, the Expos moved Mota to the bullpen, and he began the season with the single-A advanced Jupiter Hammerheads of the Florida State League. He posted a 3–2 record with a 0.66 ERA and two saves in 20 games and was promoted to the Harrisburg Senators of the double-A Eastern League during the season. With the Senators, he had a 2–0 record with a 1.06 ERA and four saves in 12 games.

Mota began the 1999 season with the Ottawa Lynx of the triple-A International League. With the Lynx, he had a 2–0 record with a 1.89 ERA and five saves in 14 games.

=== Montreal Expos (1999–2001) ===
==== 1999 ====
Mota was called up to the Expos on May 2 to replace relief pitcher Shayne Bennett, who had been demoted to Ottawa after struggling in his first four games. Mota made his major league debut the same day, pitching a scoreless inning in an 8–7 loss to the St. Louis Cardinals. He got his first major league decision on May 11, when, after pitching 2 2/3 scoreless innings, he gave up a walk-off home run in the tenth inning to Luis Gonzalez in a 4–3 loss to the Arizona Diamondbacks. On June 1, he won his first major league game, also against Arizona after pitching three scoreless innings in the Expos' 10–8 victory on June 1. On June 9, he hit a three-run home run in his first major league at bat (against Mark Guthrie) in a 13–1 victory over the Boston Red Sox. On August 29, he allowed one run in one inning and was the winning pitcher in an 8–6 victory over the Cincinnati Reds. The win (the Expos' eighteenth in August) set a new Expos' record for wins in a month. Mota had a 1.49 ERA over his first 32 games of the year, but a 15.00 ERA over his next six games brought his ERA for the season to 3.40. However, he collected a 1.38 ERA over his final 12 games to bring his ERA for the season down to 2.93, and he finished the year with a 2–4 record in 51 games.

==== 2000 ====
The Expos sent Mota to Ottawa to begin the 2000 season. However, he was called up to the Expos on May 20, and in his first game of the season with them, he gave up one run in one inning in an 8–7 victory over the Houston Astros. On June 11, he was the losing pitcher when he pitched 1/3 inning and gave up two runs in an 8–3 loss to the Toronto Blue Jays. He was returned to Ottawa on June 17 after posting a 12.60 ERA in his first 12 games with the Expos. Mota was recalled at the end of the month, but after appearing in one game (on July 1), he was returned to the Lynx. However, he was recalled on July 19 after Tony Armas Jr. was placed on the disabled list. Mota was returned to the minor leagues on July 27 when Hideki Irabu returned from the disabled list, but he was recalled soon after. However, Mota appeared in only one game before he was again returned to the minors, and he did not return to the Expos again until the beginning of September. At this point, he had a 9.98 ERA through 17 games. On September 11, in the second game of a doubleheader against the Philadelphia Phillies, he got his only win of the year by pitching one-third of an inning in a 7–6 victory. He had a 1.84 ERA over his final 12 games to finish the year with a 1–1 record and a 6.00 ERA in 29 games. With Ottawa, he had a 4–5 record with a 2.29 ERA and seven saves in 35 games.

==== 2001 ====
In 2001, Mota made the Expos out of spring training for the first time in his career. On May 12, he had a 1.59 ERA through his first 20 games of the year. However, eight earned runs allowed over his next six games raised his ERA to 4.00. Afterwards, though, he had a 2.08 ERA through his next 12 games. On June 17, he was the winning pitcher when he threw a scoreless inning in a 4–1 victory over Toronto. In his next game, on June 19, he was the losing pitcher when he gave up three runs (only one run was earned) without recording an out in a 4–1 loss to the New York Mets. However, after that 12-game stretch, he gave up five earned runs over his next four games to bring his ERA up to 4.29. On July 13, he was placed on the disabled list for the first time in his career with right shoulder tendinitis. Mota returned at the beginning of September, but he had a 10.57 ERA and two losses in his final 11 games of the year. He finished the season with a 1–3 record and a 5.26 ERA in 53 games.

=== Los Angeles Dodgers (2002–2004) ===
==== 2002 ====
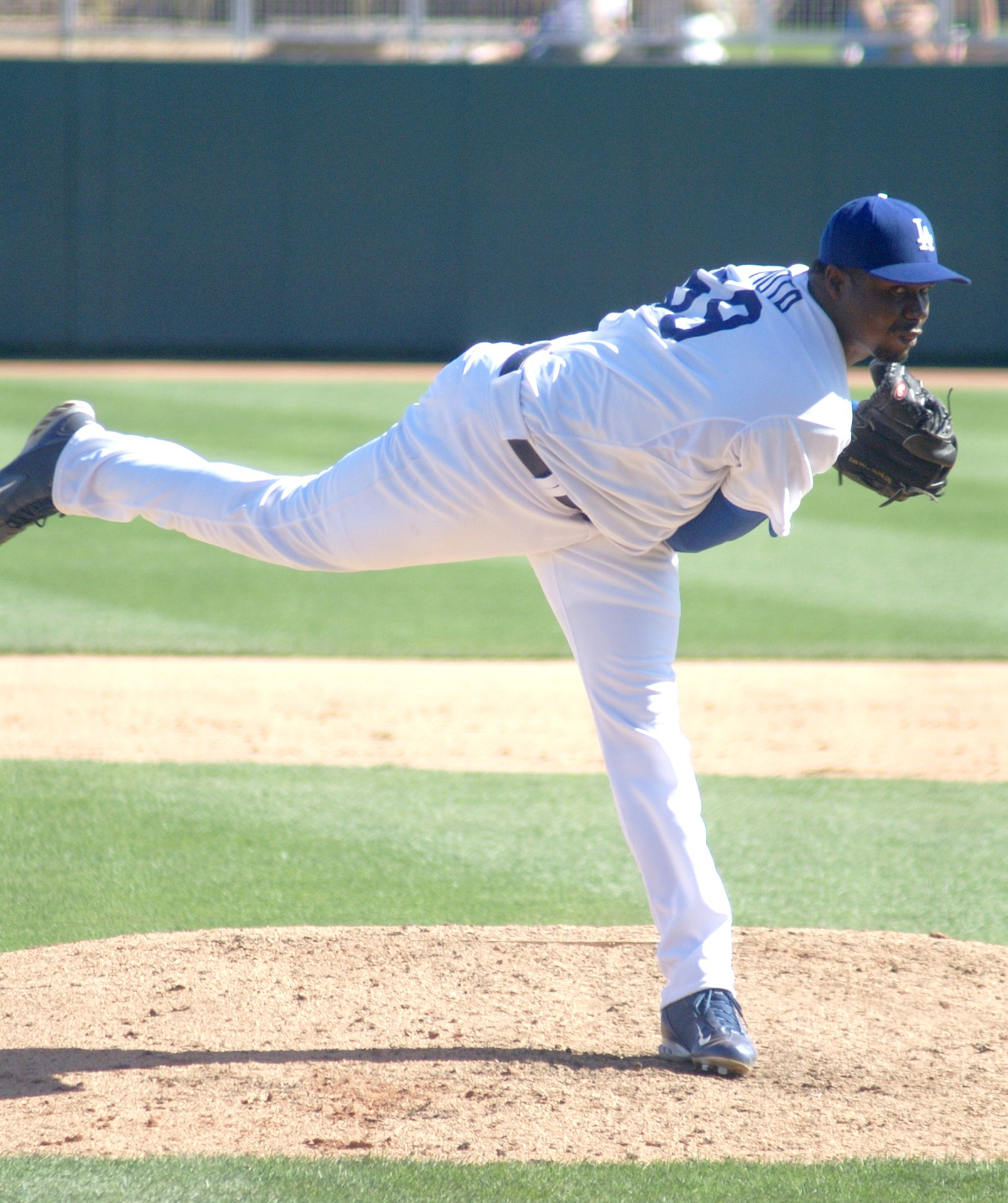
Mota with the Los Angeles Dodgers

Mota began spring training with the Expos in 2002, but was traded to the Los Angeles Dodgers with outfielder Wilkin Ruan for pitcher Matt Herges and infielder Jorge Nunez on March 23. He failed to make the Dodgers' major league club in spring training and was assigned to the Las Vegas 51s of the triple-A Pacific Coast League to begin the season. He was called up on April 20 when Kevin Brown was placed on the disabled list. After appearing in two games, he was returned to Las Vegas on April 30 when Brown came off the disabled list. On May 17, he was called up a second time. In 22 games through July 14, he had a 2.43 ERA. On June 3, he pitched a scoreless inning and earned the win in an 11–5 victory over the Colorado Rockies. However, he was returned to Las Vegas on July 28 after he had a loss and a 13.50 ERA over his next seven games. He did not return to the Dodgers until August 26, when Kevin Beirne was demoted to the minors. That same day, he was the losing pitcher when he gave up three runs (two earned) in his third inning of work in a 12-inning 6–3 loss to Arizona. He was the losing pitcher again on September 13 when he gave up three runs in the seventh inning and blew a 4–2 lead over Colorado. He posted a 3.92 ERA over his final 14 games of the year to finish with a 1–3 record and a 4.15 ERA in 43 games. With the 51s, he had a 1–3 record with a 2.95 ERA in 20 games.

==== Conflict with Mike Piazza ====
On March 28, 2002, Mota hit Mike Piazza, catcher for the Mets at the time, with a pitch in a spring training game against the Mets. After Mota was removed from the game, Piazza grabbed him by the neck and had to be separated from Mota by other players. Piazza received a $3,000 fine for his actions. Next season, in a spring training game against the Mets on March 12, Mota hit Piazza with a pitch. Piazza charged the mound, starting a brawl, and both players were ejected from the game. After the game, Piazza entered the Dodgers' clubhouse looking for Mota. Informed that Mota had left, Piazza searched the clubhouse before leaving. Mota said that hitting Piazza was not intentional, but both he and Piazza were suspended five games in the regular season and fined—Mota $1,500 and Piazza $3,000. Mota's suspension was later reduced to four games.

==== 2003 ====
In 2003, Mota earned a roster spot with the Dodgers after spring training. From May 1 to 27, he pitched 15 2/3 consecutive scoreless innings. On May 23, against the Milwaukee Brewers, he got his first save when he pitched three scoreless innings in a 6–4 victory. Manager Jim Tracy used him to get the save because he wanted to rest closer Éric Gagné. On May 29, Mota struck out six batters in three innings in a 12–5 loss to Colorado. From June 11 through July 17, he threw 19 2/3 consecutive scoreless innings. On July 13, he hit his second career home run (against Joe Roa) in a 9–3 victory over Colorado. In August, he had a 2–0 record with a 0.44 ERA in 21 games. Mota finished the season with a 6–3 record and a 1.97 ERA in 76 games, and his 105 innings pitched were the most by a Dodger reliever since 1985, when Tom Niedenfuer threw 106 1/3. His 105 innings pitched led National League (NL) relief pitchers and were just two shy of American League leader Steve Sparks. Mota, Gagné, Tom Martin, and Paul Quantrill were the first relief pitcher teammates to appear in at least 76 games in a season. His opponent batting average of .205 ranked tenth among NL relievers, and left-handers' .181 average against him ranked fourth in the NL.

==== 2004 ====
After Quantrill became a free agent, Mota became the setup man for Gagné in 2004. He started the season with eight straight scoreless games. From June 27 to July 16, he did not allow a run in 10 straight games. On July 29, he started a career-high five-game winning streak when he got a win by pitching two scoreless innings in a 2–1 victory over the San Francisco Giants. He was the winning pitcher when he pitched two scoreless innings in an 8–5 victory over the Anaheim Angels on July 3 in a game notable for Gagné getting the final save of his 84 straight converted save chances. On July 30, a day before the trade deadline, Mota had a 2.14 ERA in 52 games. That day, he was traded to the Florida Marlins with Juan Encarnación and Paul Lo Duca for Hee-seop Choi, Brad Penny, and Bill Murphy.

=== Florida Marlins (2004–2005) ===
Upon joining the Marlins, Mota was named the closer because Armando Benítez, the Marlins' closer, was injured. On August 5, he entered a game in the eighth inning with the Marlins leading 7–5 and got his first save as a Marlin in an 11–5 victory over Arizona. However, that was his only save opportunity before he was returned to the setup role because of the return of Benítez from the disabled list. Mota had a 4.81 ERA in 26 games with the Marlins, although it would have been only 3.06 if he had not given up seven runs in his final two games of the year. He finished the season with a 9–8 record and a 3.07 ERA in 78 games. His nine wins were tied with Ryan Madson for second in the NL by a relief pitcher, and his 96 2/3 innings pitched led NL relievers. His opponent batting average of .196 was fifth-best among NL relievers.

In 2005, Mota was named the Marlins' closer in spring training since Benítez became a free agent following the 2004 season. He did not get a save opportunity until April 22, which he converted in a 4–2 win over Cincinnati. He got his second save of the year the next day in another 4–2 win over Cincinnati. However, he was placed on the disabled list on May 1 (retroactive to April 24) with inflammation in his right elbow. He was activated on May 27, but Todd Jones, who had been filling in for Mota, remained the closer. Mota had a 1.69 ERA through his first 11 games, but 12 earned runs allowed over his next seven games raised his ERA to 7.27. On June 24, he was the winning pitcher in the Marlins' 7–4 victory over the Tampa Bay Devil Rays. He got his only other win of the year on August 30, when he gave up a run in two innings in a 7–6 victory over St. Louis. Mota posted a 3.81 ERA over his final 38 games to finish the season 2–2 with a 4.70 ERA in 56 games. On November 24, Mota was traded with Josh Beckett and Mike Lowell to the Boston Red Sox for four prospects: Jesús Delgado, Harvey García, Hanley Ramírez, and Aníbal Sánchez.

=== Cleveland Indians (2006) ===
Mota never played a game with the Red Sox, because on January 27, 2006, he was traded to the Cleveland Indians with Andy Marte, Kelly Shoppach, a player to be named later (eventually Randy Newsom), and cash considerations for Coco Crisp, David Riske, and Josh Bard. The trade was postponed slightly because Mota failed to pass a physical, so the Indians put him on a conditioning program before spring training. However, he was still expected to be the setup man for closer Bob Wickman. He started the season well, as he did not allow an earned run in his first seven games. However, he struggled after that, and he lost the setup role to Rafael Betancourt in May. Over his next 27 games, Mota had a 7.89 ERA, and opponents batted .314 against him. On August 11, he was designated for assignment after he had a 1–3 record with a 6.21 ERA in 34 games. On August 20, he was traded to the New York Mets with cash for a player to be named later. To date, his time with the Indians was his only stint in the American League.

=== New York Mets (2006–2007) ===
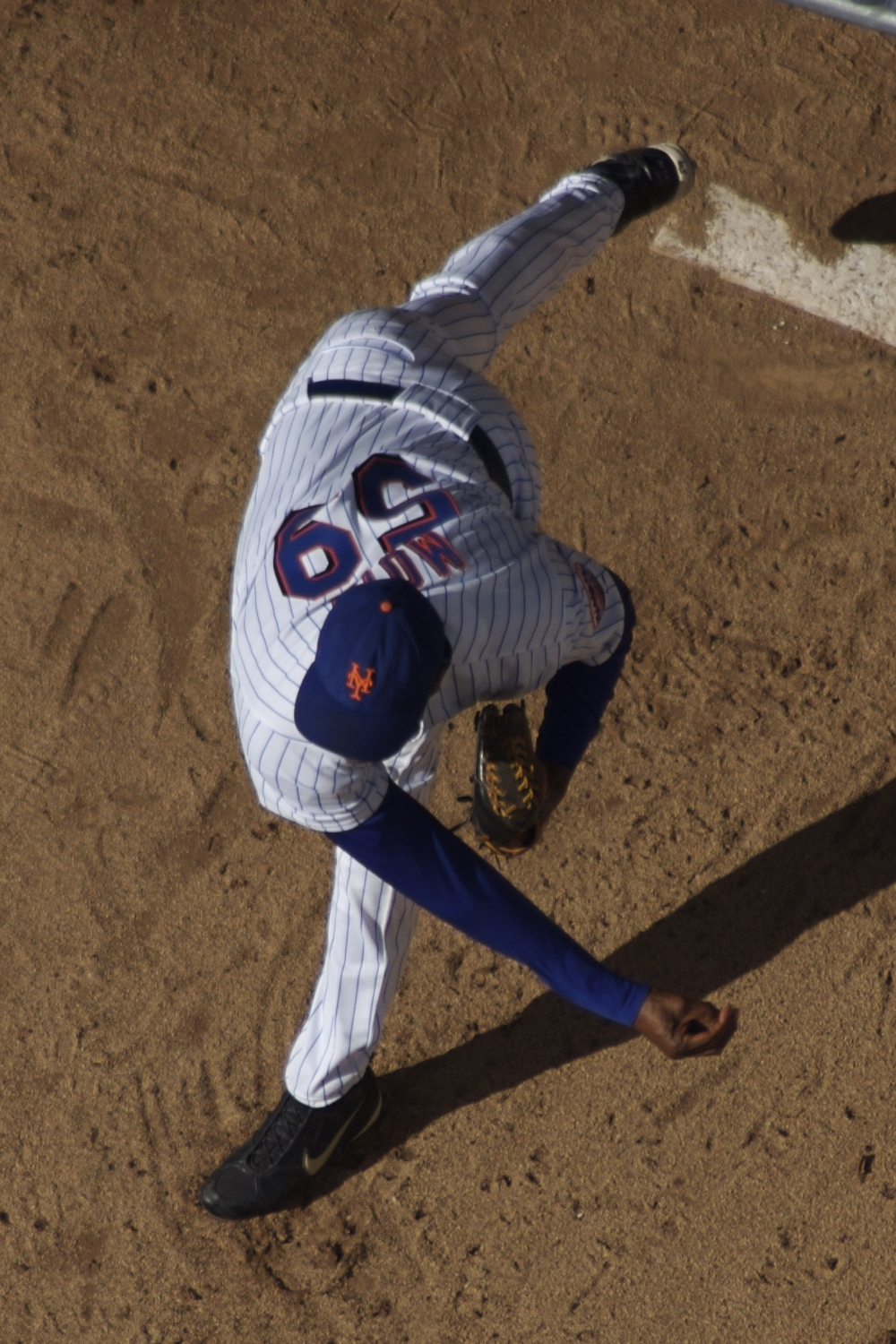
Mota with the Mets in 2007

On September 1, 2006, Mota was the winning pitcher when he pitched a scoreless inning in an 8–7 victory over Houston. He got another win by pitching a scoreless inning on September 12 in a 6–4 victory over Florida. With the Mets, he had a 3–0 record with a 1.00 ERA and 19 strikeouts in 18 games to finish the season 4–3 with a 4.53 ERA in 52 games. He made the playoffs for the first time in his career as the Mets won the NL East. In the first game of the 2006 National League Division Series against the Dodgers, Mota was the winning pitcher when he pitched two innings, although he blew a 4–1 lead by giving up three runs and allowing the Dodgers to tie the game. Mota pitched two scoreless innings in the Mets' series-winning 9–5 victory over the Dodgers in Game 3. In the 2006 National League Championship Series, Mota appeared in five of the seven games in the series. He blew a lead in an eventual Game 2 loss, but he did not give up a run in the other four games as the Mets lost to St. Louis in seven games. On October 30, he filed for free agency.

On November 1, 2006, Mota became the fifteenth MLB player to be suspended for using performance-enhancing drugs (and the first to be suspended for fifty games) when he was suspended for the first fifty games of 2007. However, the Mets re-signed him to a two-year, $5 million contract on December 7. After spending two weeks in the minors, Mota rejoined the Mets on May 30, 2007. He struggled in his first 16 games, collecting a 7.71 ERA in them. In his next 15 games, however, he amassed a 1.89 ERA. During those games, on August 3, he was the winning pitcher when he threw a scoreless inning in a 6–2 victory over the Chicago Cubs. He struggled after that, though, as he had a 7.48 ERA over his final 21 games of the season. On August 28, he was the losing pitcher when he gave up a walk-off home run to Ryan Howard in the 10th inning of a 4–2 loss to Philadelphia. He earned the win on September 12 in a 4–3 victory over the Atlanta Braves despite losing a two-run lead in the eighth inning. His final decision of the season came on September 16, when he gave up three runs without recording an out in a 10–6 loss to Philadelphia. Mota finished the season with a 2–2 record and a 5.76 ERA in 52 games. On November 20, he was traded to the Milwaukee Brewers for Johnny Estrada.

=== Milwaukee Brewers (2008) ===
Mota started the 2008 season with a 2.20 ERA in his first 15 games. On May 11, Brewers manager Ned Yost removed Gagné from the closer's role and decided to use different pitchers in save opportunities. The next day, Mota got his first save since 2005 in an 8–3 victory over St. Louis. However, that was his only save of the season, and Salomón Torres took over the closer's role. Mota began to struggle after the save, as he had a 9.00 ERA over his next 19 games to bring his ERA to 5.77 at the All-Star break. However, he began pitching better after the All-Star break as he posted a 1.59 ERA in his final 24 games of the season. On August 24, Mota was the winning pitcher in a 4–3 victory over Pittsburgh when he entered the game with the bases loaded and no outs and did not allow a run to score in one inning of work. He finished the season with a 5–6 record and a 4.11 ERA in 58 games, and he returned to the playoffs as the Brewers made the playoffs for the first time in 26 years. In the first game of the 2008 National League Division Series, he pitched a scoreless 1/3 inning in a 3–1 loss to Philadelphia. His only other appearance of the playoffs that year came in Game 4 (the final game of the series) when he allowed a solo home run to Pat Burrell in the final 1 1/3 innings of a 6–2 loss. On November 3, Mota filed for free agency.

=== Second stint with the Dodgers (2009) ===
On January 13, 2009, Mota returned to the Dodgers upon signing a one-year contract. His second stint with the Dodgers got off to a bad start, as he posted a 9.00 ERA in his first 15 games of the season. However, his statistics improved when he compiled a 0.26 ERA over his next 29 games to lower his season ERA to 2.92. From June 24 through July 29, Mota gave up no runs in 17 games (20 1/3 consecutive innings pitched). However, he had a 4.97 ERA over his next 13 games. On August 4, in a 17–4 victory over Milwaukee, Mota was ejected after he hit Brewers first baseman Prince Fielder with a pitch (in retaliation for Chris Smith hitting Manny Ramirez a few innings earlier, according to Dodgers catcher Russell Martin). After the game, Fielder attempted to gain entry into the Dodgers' clubhouse to confront Mota but was stopped by teammates. Both Mota and Fielder were fined by Major League Baseball for their actions. On August 31, Mota was placed on the disabled list with an ingrown toenail to make room for Ronnie Belliard on the roster. He was reactivated on September 14. However, after posting a 5.40 ERA in his final four games of the year, he was left off the Dodgers' playoff roster. He finished the season with a 3–4 record and a 3.44 ERA (his lowest since 2004) in 61 games. On November 6, he filed for free agency.

=== San Francisco Giants (2010–2012) ===
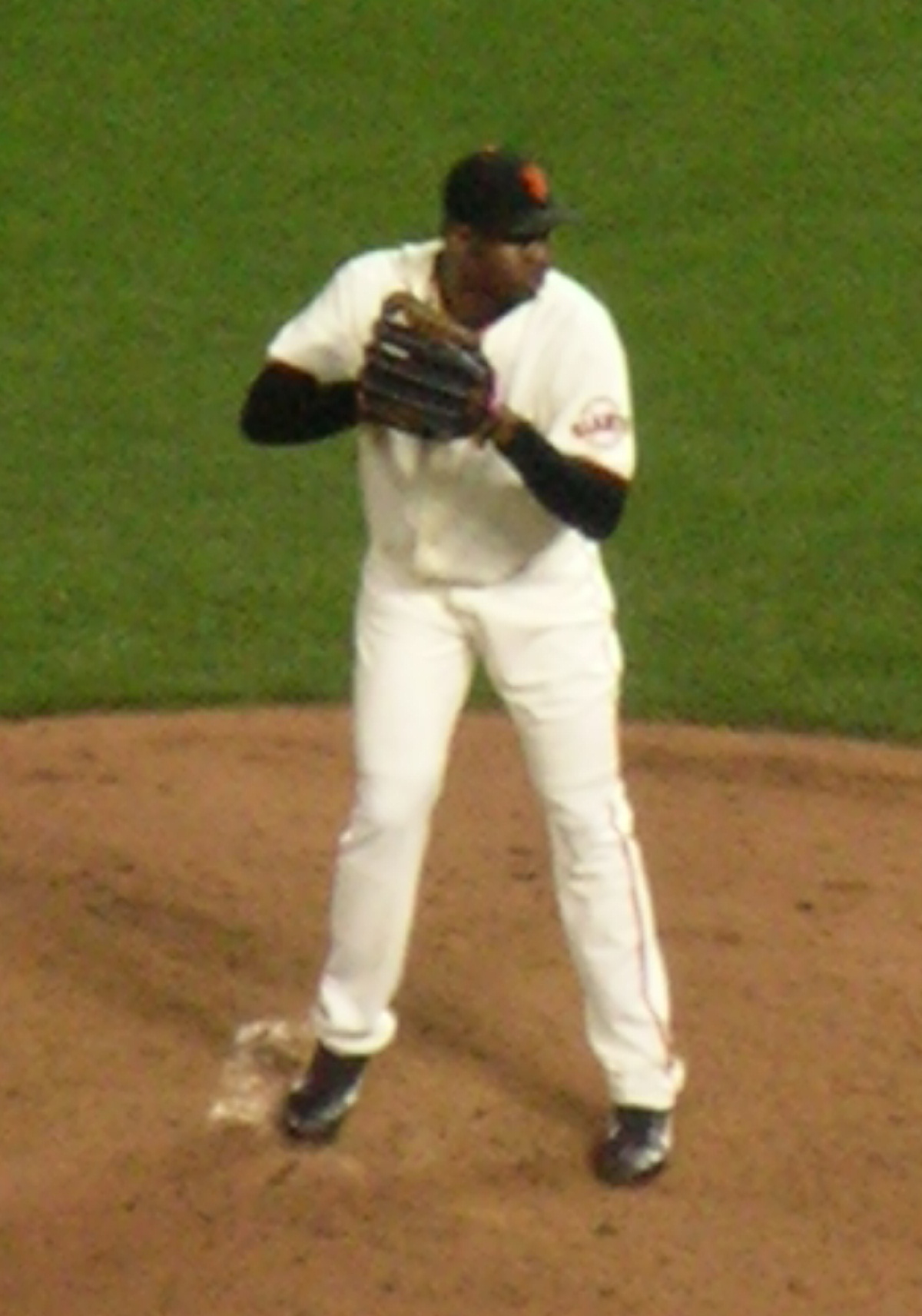
Mota with the San Francisco Giants

On February 2, 2010, Mota signed a minor league contract with the San Francisco Giants with an invitation to spring training, marking the first time he was a non-roster invitee. On April 4, he was placed in the final spot in the Giants' bullpen. He started his tenure with the Giants with nine consecutive scoreless outings. On May 5, he got his only save of 2010 in a 9–6 victory over Florida. Mota took over the setup role in May, but lost it after allowing five runs and losing one of three games from June 10 to 13. He compiled a 1.27 ERA over his first 23 games, but a 7.48 ERA over his next 28 games raised his ERA to 4.78. On July 4, he intentionally walked four batters in 1 1/3 innings (due to runners reaching third base with nobody out in the 14th and 15th innings) and was the losing pitcher when he allowed a run in the 15th inning of a 4–3 loss to Colorado. On August 23, he was placed on the disabled list with iliotibial band syndrome to make room for Cody Ross on the Giants' roster. He returned to the Giants on September 6. Mota did not give up an earned run in his final five appearances of the season to finish the year with a 1–3 record and a 4.33 ERA in 56 games, and he made the Giants' playoff roster as they won the NL West. However, he was not used until Game 2 of the 2010 World Series, when he pitched a scoreless ninth inning in a 9–0 victory over the Texas Rangers. His only other postseason appearance came when he pitched 1 1/3 scoreless innings in a 4–2 loss in Game 3. However, Mota won his first World Series when the Giants defeated Texas 4 games to 1 in the series. After the series, he filed for free agency.

On December 19, Mota signed another minor league contract with an invitation to spring training with the Giants. He won one of the final two spots in the Giants' bullpen on March 30, 2011. On April 16, after Giants' starter Barry Zito was injured in the second inning, Mota pitched a career-high 4 1/3 innings, giving up one run and earning the win in a 5–3 victory over Arizona.

On May 7, 2012, MLB announced that they were suspending Mota for 100 games due to his testing positive for Clenbuterol, a performance-enhancing substance. This was his second suspension as he had previously been suspended for 50 games in 2006. Mota returned to the team late in the year and pitched in both the NLDS and the NLCS as part of the Giants' championship run in 2012, although he did not make any appearances in the World Series.

=== Kansas City Royals ===
On January 16, 2014, Mota signed a minor league contract with the Kansas City Royals. However, he announced his retirement on March 2, 2014.

== Pitching style ==
Mota had three different kinds of pitches: a fastball, a slider, and a circle changeup, and occasionally he mixed in a splitter and a curveball. Because of a record of wildness with his fastball, his slider became his out pitch.

== See also ==
- List of doping cases in sport
- List of players with a home run in first major league at bat
