= Luke Allen =

American baseball player (1978–2022)

- Outfielder
- Born: August 4, 1978; Covington, Georgia, U.S.
- Died: April 26, 2022 (aged 43); Covington, Georgia, U.S.
- Batted: Right Threw: Right

MLB debut
- September 10, 2002, for the Los Angeles Dodgers

Last MLB appearance
- July 17, 2003, for the Colorado Rockies

MLB statistics
- Batting average: .111
- Home runs: 0
- RBIs: 0
- Stats at Baseball Reference

Teams
- Los Angeles Dodgers (2002); Colorado Rockies (2003)

Lucas Gale Allen (August 4, 1978 – April 26, 2022), was an American professional baseball outfielder, who played in Major League Baseball with the Los Angeles Dodgers and the Colorado Rockies from 2002–2003.

== Career ==
Allen played high school baseball at Newton High School in Georgia and committed to play college baseball at Southern Union State Community College in Alabama in 1997. However, Allen signed by the Los Angeles Dodgers as an amateur free agent in 1996 and was assigned to the Great Falls Dodgers for the 1996 season. After starting the 1997 season with the San Bernardino Stampede in Single-A, he was promoted to the Double-A San Antonio Missions, where he played until 2000. He started 2001 for the Jacksonville Suns (where he was selected as a Southern League All-Star outfielder) and then was promoted to the Triple-A Las Vegas 51s. In 2002 with Las Vegas, he hit .329 with 12 homers and 78 RBIs, leading to a September call-up to the Los Angeles Dodgers.

Allen made his Major League Baseball debut with the Los Angeles Dodgers on September 10, 2002, as a pinch hitter against the San Francisco Giants, drawing a walk. He recorded his first hit (a double) on September 14 against Kent Mercker of the Colorado Rockies. That was the only hit he would have in his major league career, as he played in six games for the Dodgers that season, with seven at-bats and three strikeouts.

Allen was traded by the Dodgers to the Rockies on January 27, 2003, in exchange for outfielder Jason Romano and spent most of the year with the Rockies Triple-A team, the Colorado Springs Sky Sox, before getting a September call-up for the Rockies, where he was hitless in two at-bats as a pinch hitter.

Allen left the Rockies as a free agent after the season and played for several minor league teams, playing from 2004-06 for the Triple-A affiliates of the Pittsburgh Pirates, Anaheim Angels, San Diego Padres and Boston Red Sox. In 2007, he started the season with the Jacksonville Suns, back in the Dodgers system, but hit only .236 with one home run in 33 games and was released. In 2008, he played for the New Jersey Jackals in the Can-Am League.

Allen died on April 26, 2022, in his hometown.
