= Éric Gagné =

Canadian baseball player (born 1976)

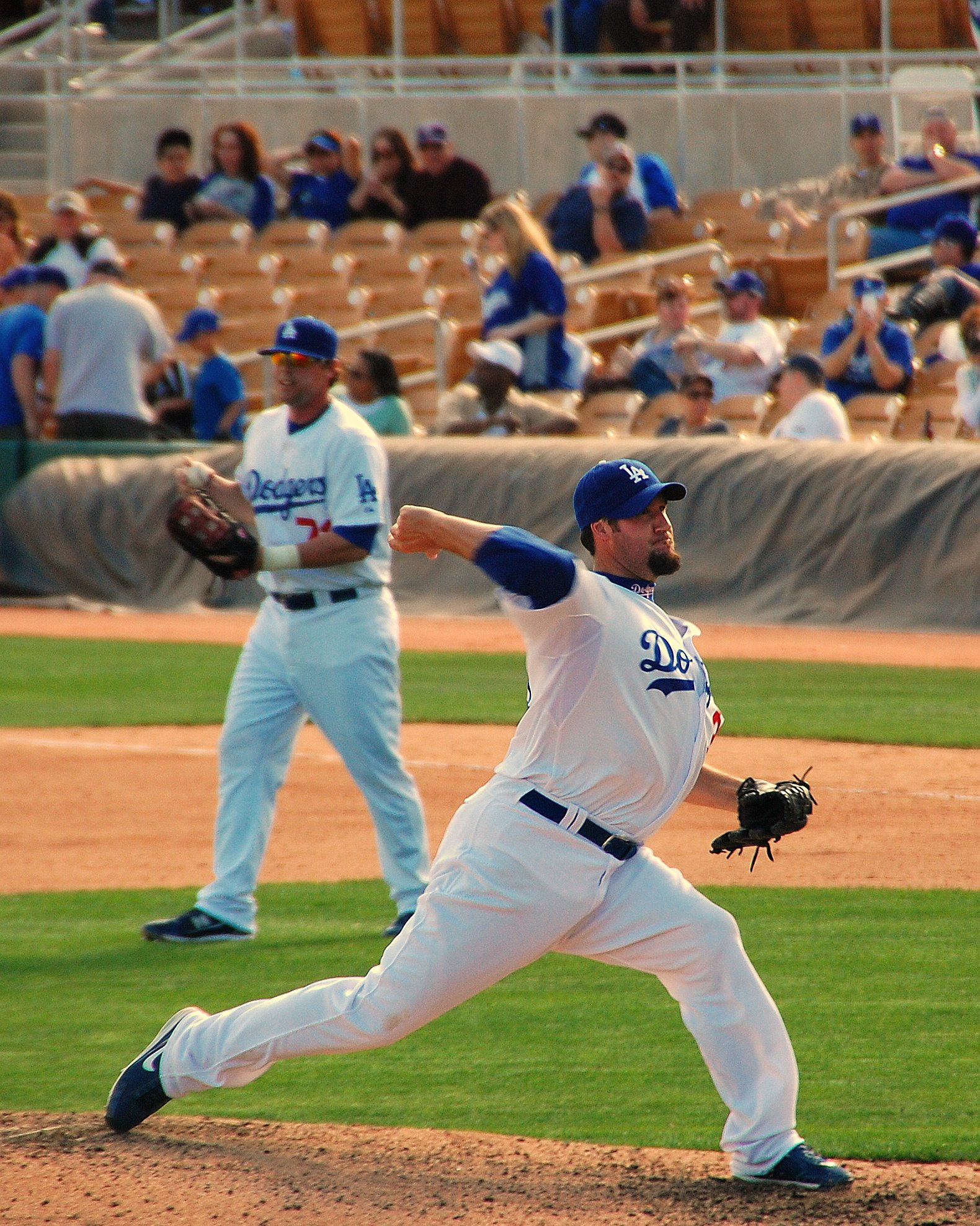
- Gagné with the Los Angeles Dodgers in 2010
- Pitcher
- Born: January 7, 1976 (age 50); Montreal, Quebec, Canada
- Batted: Right Threw: Right

MLB debut
- September 7, 1999, for the Los Angeles Dodgers

Last MLB appearance
- September 25, 2008, for the Milwaukee Brewers

MLB statistics
- Win–loss record: 33–26
- Earned run average: 3.47
- Strikeouts: 718
- Saves: 187
- Stats at Baseball Reference

Teams
- Los Angeles Dodgers (1999–2006); Texas Rangers (2007); Boston Red Sox (2007); Milwaukee Brewers (2008)

Career highlights and awards
- 3× All-Star (2002–2004); World Series champion (2007); NL Cy Young Award (2003); 2× NL Rolaids Relief Man Award (2003, 2004); NL saves leader (2003)

Éric Serge Gagné (French pronunciation: [ɡɑɲe]; born January 7, 1976) is a Canadian former professional baseball pitcher who played 10 seasons in Major League Baseball (MLB), most notably for the Los Angeles Dodgers. After signing with the Dodgers as a free agent in 1995, Gagné began his career as a starting pitcher. After he struggled in that role, the Dodgers converted Gagné from a starter to a reliever, where for three years (2002–2004) he was statistically the most outstanding closer in the league, winning the Cy Young Award in 2003. During that period, he set a major league record by converting 84 consecutive save opportunities.

Gagné played sparingly in 2005 and 2006 due to injury, undergoing elbow surgery in 2005 and back surgery in 2006. The Dodgers did not re-sign him after 2006, and Gagné started the 2007 season with the Texas Rangers, where he briefly enjoyed success again as a closer. However, he was less successful in stints with the Boston Red Sox and Milwaukee Brewers, and was released after the 2008 season.

In December 2007, days after signing a contract for 2008 with the Milwaukee Brewers, he was linked to baseball's steroids scandal after he was named in the Mitchell Report.

== Early life ==
Gagné comes from a Québécois family and grew up in the town of Mascouche, near Montreal. As a child, he played baseball and ice hockey at Montreal's Polyvalente Édouard-Montpetit High School, the same high school Russell Martin attended.

His Little League teams were coached by his father, Richard. He eventually became a star with Canada's Junior World Championship teams. He was a fan of the Montreal Expos and Montreal Canadiens throughout his childhood.

== College career ==
Gagné attended Seminole Junior College in Seminole, Oklahoma. At first, Gagné knew very little English; he became proficient in English by watching American TV while in college, mainly the sitcom Kenan and Kel. He eventually became the star pitcher for Seminole's baseball team.

== Professional career ==
=== Draft and minor leagues ===
He was a 30th-round draft choice (845th overall) of the Chicago White Sox in 1994 MLB draft, but the following year he signed with the Los Angeles Dodgers as an amateur free agent. Gagne then pitched in the minor leagues but missed the entire 1997 season due to Tommy John surgery.

=== Los Angeles Dodgers (1999–2006) ===
He made his MLB debut on September 7, when he started a game for the Dodgers against the Florida Marlins, working six shutout innings and striking out eight. In his first year in MLB, he appeared in only five games as a starting pitcher, with a 1–1 record and 2.10 ERA. Over his first three seasons, he won eleven games while losing fourteen in 48 games, 38 of them starts.

At the start of the 2002 season, following the retirement of Dodgers closer Jeff Shaw, he was converted from a starting pitcher to a relief pitcher. He picked up his first career save on April 7 against the Colorado Rockies and soon became the National League's leading reliever. He saved 10 consecutive games before he suffered his first blown save on May 7 against the Atlanta Braves. He was elected to his first All-Star Game that year, becoming the second player from Quebec to be named an All-Star (the first being Claude Raymond). In the All-Star Game he served up a two-run homer to Alfonso Soriano in the fifth, allowing the AL to cut the NL lead to 4–2. Overall, he earned 52 saves for the season.

In 2003, as a closer, Gagné converted all 55 save opportunities en route to becoming both the first pitcher to record 50 saves in more than one season and also the fastest pitcher to ever reach the 100-save plateau. His 55 saves in 2003 also equaled the National League record set the previous season by John Smoltz. Between August 26, 2002, and July 5, 2004, he converted 84 consecutive save chances, a major league record. More than half (55%) of the batters he retired during the 2003 season came by strikeout.

When Gagné entered a game at Dodger Stadium, usually in the eighth or ninth inning with the Dodgers in the lead, the words "Game Over" would flash across the scoreboard, and the PA system would play the song "Welcome to the Jungle" by Guns N' Roses.

In addition to his 55 saves, Gagné finished the 2003 season with a 1.20 earned run average and had 137 strikeouts and 20 walks in 82 1/3 innings pitched. This translated into 1.66 strikeouts per inning pitched. For his performance, he won the Rolaids Relief Man of the Year Award and became the first relief pitcher in 11 years to win the Cy Young Award. He and Ferguson Jenkins are the only two Canadian pitchers to win the most prestigious pitching award in baseball. He is the only pitcher to win the award while having a losing season (his record was 2–3). As a result, in the off-season, during contract arbitration he asked for a 14-fold raise from $550,000 to $8 million but settled for $5 million.

His streak finally ended at 84 saves on July 5, 2004, against the Arizona Diamondbacks. Ten days later, Gagné collected his 130th save as a Dodger in a 5–2 win over the Diamondbacks at Bank One Ballpark in Phoenix, Arizona, surpassing Jeff Shaw for the most career saves in team history. Gagné threw three shutout innings during his first appearance in the playoffs that year, but the Dodgers lost the division series 3–1 to the St. Louis Cardinals. Going into the 2007 season, Gagné had converted 161 saves out of 168 save opportunities for a conversion rate of 95.8%.

=== Injuries ===
Before the start of the 2005 season, Gagné and the Dodgers agreed to a two-year, $19 million contract. He sustained several injuries early that year. Although he was still an effective pitcher, 2.70 ERA and 8 for 8 in save opportunities, Gagné was only able to appear in 14 games that season. On June 21, 2005, it was announced that Gagné would undergo season-ending Tommy John surgery to repair a sprained ligament in his right elbow. Recovery would take a year or more; furthermore, a return to major league pitching after a second Tommy John operation (Gagné's first was in 1997) is nearly unheard of, having since been achieved by another Dodger reliever, the Taiwanese left-hander Hong-Chih Kuo. However, as surgeons began to operate, they discovered instead a nerve entrapped by scar tissue and were able to release it with a less invasive procedure. Gagné was still unable to play for the remainder of the 2005 season.

Gagné expressed hope that an accelerated recovery would allow him to pitch for Canada in the World Baseball Classic in March 2006, but he eventually decided that it was not worth the risk, and to focus on preparing to pitch in the regular season.

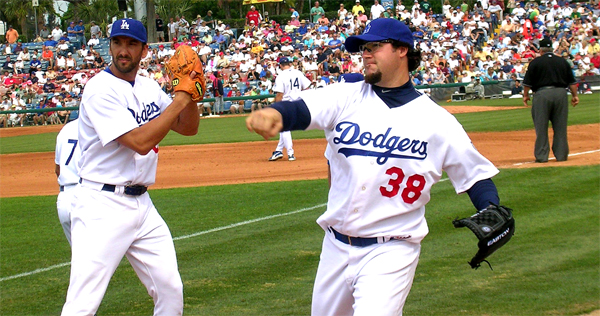
Gagné (right) during spring training in 2006

After some encouraging outings in early spring training, pain in Gagné's pitching elbow forced him to undergo a second surgery, this time to remove entirely the nerve that doctors had previously attempted to stabilize. More recovery time ensued, but Gagné finally pitched in his first regular-season game of 2006 on June 3. He made two appearances for the Dodgers, pitching two scoreless innings and earning one save, but pain from the nerve in his elbow recurred, and he returned to the disabled list on June 12. A further (and apparently unrelated) setback occurred on July 4, when Gagné awoke with intense pain in his back. An examination revealed two herniated discs, and Gagné underwent season-ending back surgery on July 8.

=== Texas Rangers (2007) ===
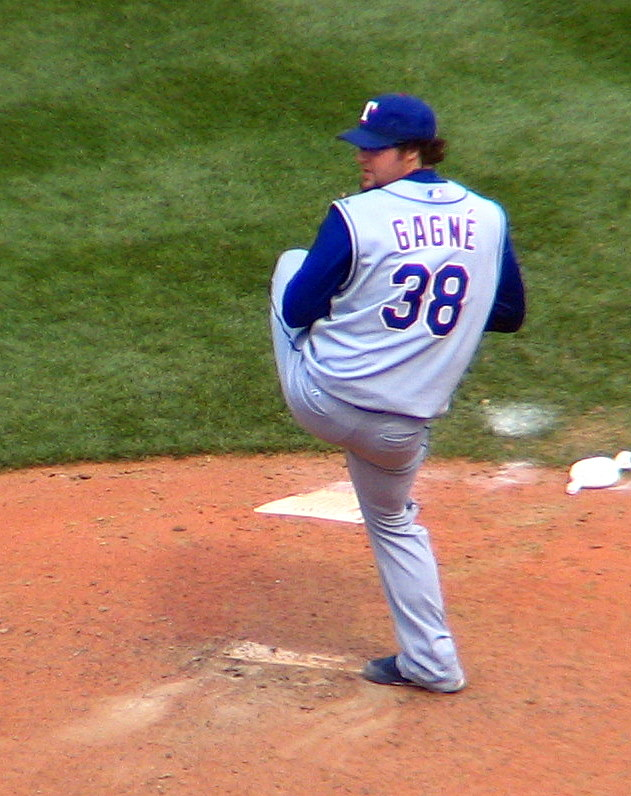
Gagné with the Texas Rangers in 2007.

The Dodgers declined to extend Gagné's $12 million contract after the season, making him a free agent. On December 12, 2006, Gagné signed a one-year deal with the Texas Rangers worth $6 million, with a possible $5 million in performance bonuses. Gagné had a poor spring training, allowing five earned runs in only three innings of work. For the third consecutive year, Gagné was placed on the disabled list to start the season to let him recover from his injuries. Gagné started to make his recovery by tossing in three minor league games, two of them on consecutive days, allowing a home run and having one loss. In his last minor league game, Gagné retired all three of the batters he faced, and he was activated on April 13.

In his first week back, Gagné pitched three innings, earning one save. But in the middle of his second save situation, Gagné left the game after complaining of leg pain. He said that it would take about a week to recover from the injury, but the Rangers, not taking the risk, placed Gagné on the disabled list with a hip injury. He was reactivated on May 8 and returned to the closer role. During his time with Texas, he was 2–0 with 16 saves and an ERA of 2.16; opposing hitters batted only .192 against him.

=== Boston Red Sox (2007) ===
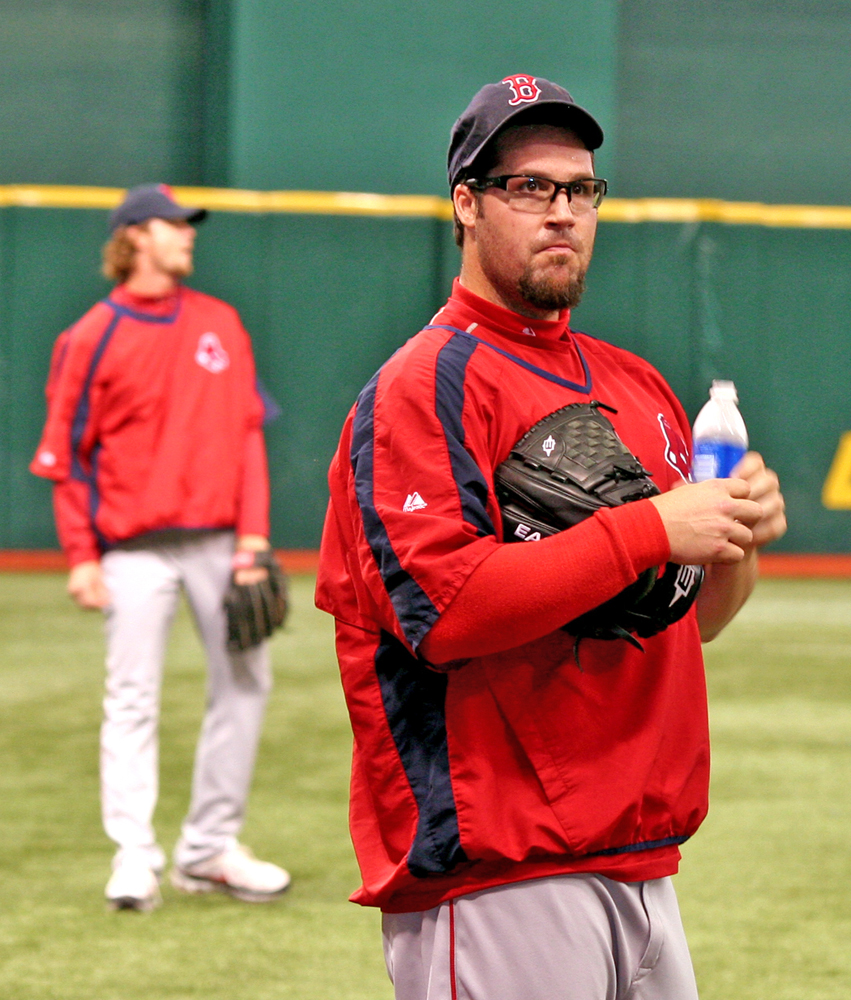
Gagné warming up for the Boston Red Sox before a game in 2007

On July 31, 2007, Gagné was traded to the Boston Red Sox for pitcher Kason Gabbard and minor league outfielders David Murphy and Engel Beltré. Gagné was expected to serve as a setup man for closer Jonathan Papelbon. Theo Epstein was quoted as saying "I think the bullpen is already a strength of the club, but acquiring a pitcher the caliber of Éric Gagné only makes it stronger and helps give us what we hope will be a truly dominant bullpen for the remainder of the year."

However, Gagné struggled in his new role with the Red Sox. In his first 15 appearances, Gagné allowed 14 earned runs in 14 innings (a 9.00 ERA) with three blown saves and an opponent batting average of over .350.

Gagné seemed to improve down the stretch and was eventually added to the playoff roster. In the playoffs, he was most often used in games in which the Red Sox were winning by a wide margin, including his only World Series appearance in which he pitched a perfect ninth inning in a 13–1 Game 1 victory. The only exception to this was his appearance in Game 2 of the American League Championship Series against the Cleveland Indians. Brought into a tie game in the top of the 11th inning, Gagné took the loss after allowing the first two runs of a 7-run 11th inning.

In Boston, Gagné wore the number 83, as starting pitcher Curt Schilling already wore Gagné's usual number 38.

=== Milwaukee Brewers (2008) ===
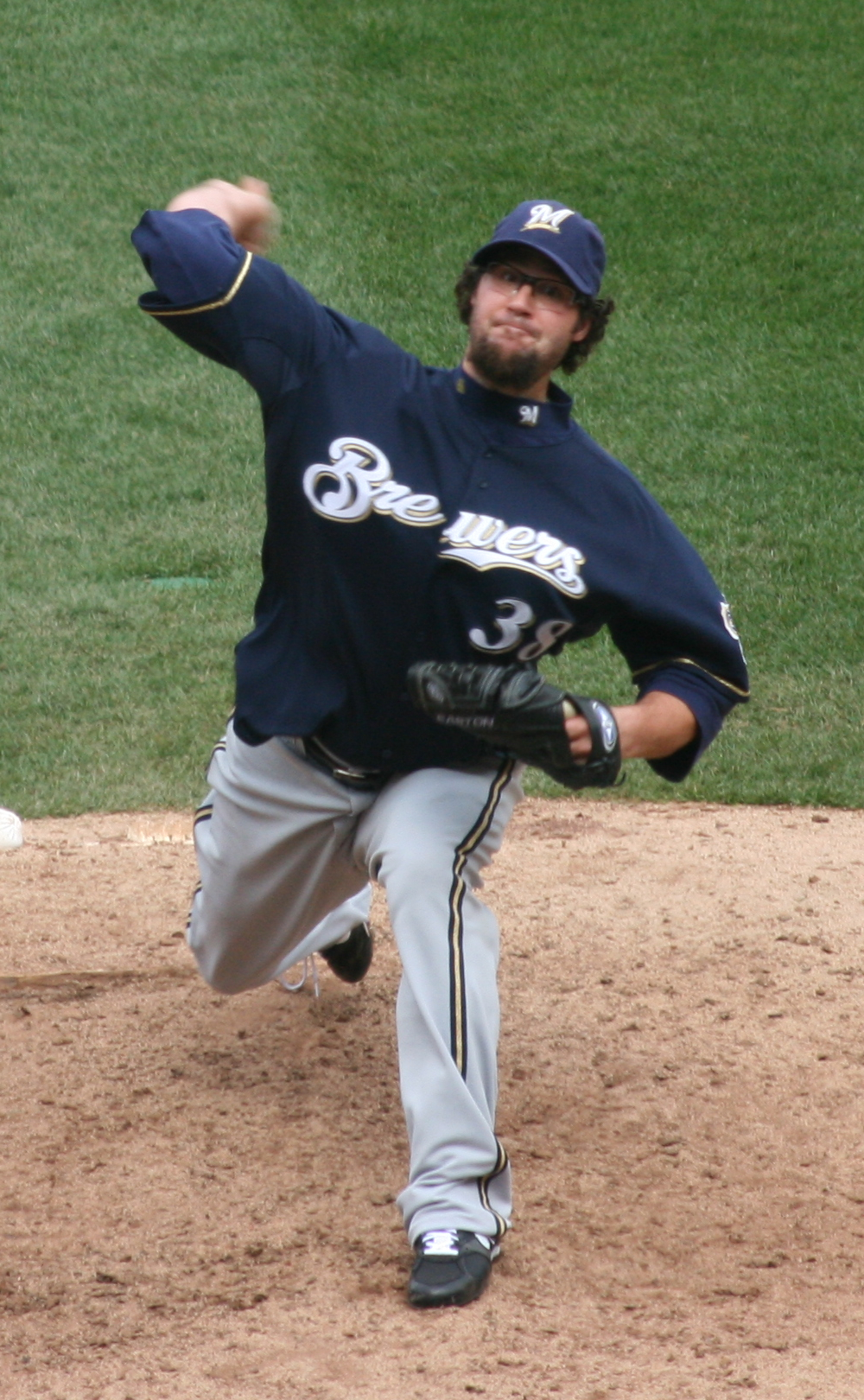
Gagné pitching for the Milwaukee Brewers on April 12, 2008

On December 9, 2007, Gagné reached a preliminary agreement with the Milwaukee Brewers. On December 10, he inked the one-year deal to become their new closer. The one-year deal had a base salary of $10 million, with incentives worth up to an extra $1 million. Gagné went back to wearing the number 38 after wearing 83 in Boston.

On May 11, Brewers manager Ned Yost announced Gagné would be removed from the closer's role for a while after three blown saves in six attempts. After a few days, Gagné indicated he was ready to return to his role as closer, and a couple of days later, got his 10th save. However, Gagné continued to struggle as the team's closer and ultimately became the set-up man after losing his closer job to the veteran Salomón Torres before hitting the disabled list with a rotator cuff injury. After Gagné's return, his struggles continued out of the bullpen, however, and he eventually lost his set-up job to Guillermo Mota. He finished the season as a middle relief pitcher, a role in which he still struggled.

Gagné finished 2008 with his worst full season in the major leagues: 10 saves in 17 opportunities, an ERA of 5.41, and 38 strikeouts in 46 innings. He did not convert a save after losing the closer job to Torres.

Gagné became a free agent following the 2008 season. He re-signed with the Brewers on a minor league deal. He was released midway through spring training in part due to a shoulder injury.

=== Québec Capitales ===
On May 26, 2009, Gagné announced he had signed with the Quebec Capitales of the independent Can-Am League as a starting pitcher/coach. Gagné began playing with the team on June 9, 2009. He had been highly praised by Capitales manager Michel Laplante for his hard work and mentorship of other pitchers and hitters on the team. Gagné helped the team win the League Championship in September 2009. On July 26, 2009, in a game versus the New Jersey Jackals, he recorded 6 no-hit innings in a 7-inning game. He would surrender two straight hits. However, the team would end the game on a triple play. In 17 starts 102.2 innings he went 6-6 with a 4.65 ERA with 64 strikeouts throwing 2 complete games and 1 shutout.

=== Attempted comeback with the Los Angeles Dodgers ===
On February 18, 2010, Gagné agreed to a minor league contract with the Los Angeles Dodgers with an invite to spring training. Dodgers reliever Ramón Troncoso, remembering Gagné's mentorship of young pitchers such as himself during Gagné's earlier stint with the Dodgers, "had no problem" releasing to Gagné his old uniform number 38. Gagné made three Spring training appearances with the Dodgers, allowing six runs on eight hits in 2 2/3 innings, for a 20.25 ERA. On March 15, he was reassigned to minor league camp, acknowledging that he needed more work to bring his game back to the Major League level. After appearing in just one minor league intrasquad game after his demotion, on March 21, Gagné asked for and was granted his release from the Dodgers, with the hope that he could find another opportunity with another team. However, he announced his retirement on April 18, 2010.

=== Trois-Rivières Aigles and Ottawa Champions ===
On August 28, 2015, six years after his last presence in professional baseball, Gagné participated in a game with the Trois-Rivières Aigles (of which he is a co-owner) of the independent Can-Am League as a starting pitcher. Gagné recorded 2 strikeouts in 4 1/3 innings, allowing only 1 run and two hits but gave up 5 walks to the opposite team, the Quebec Capitales, in a 5–3 win for the Aigles.

On September 5, 2016, Gagné pitched for the Ottawa Champions of the Can-Am League, attracting nearly 8,000 fans.

=== 2017 World Baseball Classic ===
On January 14, 2017, it was reported that Gagne, along with retired pitcher Ryan Dempster, would be joining the Team Canada pitching staff for the 2017 World Baseball Classic.

=== Second comeback attempt ===
Before the start of the 2017 season, Gagne announced that he was pondering a return to MLB. After working out with the Dodgers during spring training and pitching in the WBC, he signed a contract with the independent Long Island Ducks of the Atlantic League of Professional Baseball. He retired again on May 21, 2017. In 5 games 3.2 innings of relief he struggled immensely going 0-2 with a 12.27 ERA with 5 strikeouts.

== Coaching career ==
=== Coach for France ===
Gagné, who is Canadian and whose native language is French, served as the pitching coach for the France national baseball team during the 2013 World Baseball Classic qualifiers in September 2012. France failed to win a game and did not qualify for the main tournament.

In the fall of 2013, Gagné was named the head coach of the French national baseball team. The team finished in sixth place in the 2014 European Championships under Gagne. France competed in the 2016 World Baseball Classic Qualifiers in Panama.

=== Texas Rangers ===
Gagné rejoined the Texas Rangers organization as a coach in 2018, serving as the pitching coach of the Arizona League Rangers of the rookie-level Arizona League. In 2019, Gagné was promoted to bullpen coach of the Nashville Sounds of the Triple-A Pacific Coast League. Gagné was released by the Rangers organization following the 2019 season.

== Use of HGH ==
On December 13, 2007, Gagné was listed in the Mitchell Report — former Senator George Mitchell's report on the use of performance-enhancing drugs in baseball. Gagné was identified as a user of HGH (human growth hormone). Allegedly, Gagné received the drugs from steroids dealer Kirk Radomski. At first, Radomski said that Gagné obtained them from Dodgers teammate Paul Lo Duca, but then Radomski said in the report that he mailed two shipments of HGH directly to Gagné in 2004. Receipts of FedEx and USPS shipments indicate that Radomski received at least one payment from Gagné and two from Dodgers teammate Lo Duca on behalf of Gagné. Gagné declined to meet with Senator Mitchell to respond to the charges before the report was released.

In a 2009 interview with the Los Angeles Times, Gagné expressed remorse not only for what he had done but also for the fact that he could not speak openly about it, likely (according to the Times) due to reluctance to implicate others.

I'm not denying it. I'm not saying I did it. I just can't talk about it. It's a touchy subject. It doesn't just involve me. I've been straightforward about everything. It [stinks] that I can't be about this. I'm not looking for sympathy anyway. I have to live with this for the rest of my life. I'm going to have to explain this to my kids. It's going to be on my resume for the rest of my life.

— Éric Gagné, Los Angeles Times, July 5, 2009

Gagné acknowledged that he has been looked to as a role model and called himself an example of what one should not do. On the other hand, when asked whether he had given an honest performance to Dodgers fans, he maintained that he had always worked hard to do so.

In a February 2010 interview with the Los Angeles Times, Gagné admitted that he had used HGH, saying that it was to recover from a knee injury.

== Pitching style ==
Gagné had an assortment of pitches he used as a reliever but his most commonly used were a four-seam fastball in the mid-to-upper 90s and a Vulcan changeup in the mid-80s. Gagné also featured a two-seam fastball, a slow curveball, and a rarely used slider.

Although he was also praised for his "Bugs Bunny curveball," Gagné's changeup was considered his best pitch. Sportswriter Dan Habib wrote:

Most closers depend on one pitch that becomes synonymous with their success: Trevor Hoffman's changeup, Mariano Rivera's cut fastball. Gagné thrives on the dizzying oscillation between his changeup and his fastball. They have the same release point and the same arm speed. The fastball is straight gas ... but the changeup is a devious thing, a bowling ball rolled off a picnic table. It travels some 10 mph slower than his fastball, anywhere from 83 to 88 mph, and like a splitter it breaks late and sharp.

Gagné used this combination of pitches to rack up strikeouts at a very high rate. In his Cy Young-winning season of 2003, he had 100 more strikeouts (137) than hits he allowed (37). This produced a strikeout-to-hit ratio of 3.7, a single-season record for relief pitchers with 50 innings. He also has the highest percentage of swinging strikes as a percent of his total pitches (18.5%) among all pitchers since the 2002 season. He also owns the highest percentage of swinging strikes on pitches inside the strike zone.

Gagné exhibited an emotional presence on the mound: "I like to show my emotion, be real aggressive, and give everything I've got for one-half inning."

== Personal life ==
Gagné was previously married to Valerie Hervieux, with whom he shares four children. His father's cousin, Paul Gagné, played several seasons in the NHL.

On July 31, 2020, Gagné was involved in multiple hit-and-run accidents in Terrebonne, Quebec. Police reportedly apprehended him after he fled the scene.

== Career highlights ==
MLB Records
Accomplishment	Record
Regular season
Most consecutive save opportunities converted	84 (2002–04)
Most single season saves in National League (Note: Tied for fourth most single season saves with John Smoltz, behind Francisco Rodriguez, Edwin Diaz and Bobby Thigpen)	55 (2003)

== See also ==
- List of Major League Baseball individual streaks
- List of Major League Baseball annual saves leaders
- List of Major League Baseball players named in the Mitchell Report
