= 2005 Pittsburgh Pirates season =

2005 Pittsburgh Pirates
- League: National League
- Division: Central
- Ballpark: PNC Park
- City: Pittsburgh, Pennsylvania
- Record: 67–95 (.414)
- Divisional place: 6th
- Owners: Kevin McClatchy
- General managers: Dave Littlefield
- Managers: Lloyd McClendon; Pete Mackanin
- Television: FSN Pittsburgh
- Radio: KDKA-AM (Steve Blass, Greg Brown, Lanny Frattare, Bob Walk, John Wehner)

The 2005 Pittsburgh Pirates season was the 124th season of the franchise; the 119th in the National League. This was their fifth season at PNC Park. The Pirates finished sixth and last in the National League Central with a record of 67–95.

== Offseason ==
- November 2, 2004: Jorge Velandia was signed as a free agent with the Pittsburgh Pirates.
- November 27, 2004: Jason Kendall was traded by the Pittsburgh Pirates with cash to the Oakland Athletics for Mark Redman, Arthur Rhodes, and cash.

== Regular season ==
=== Season standings ===
NL Central
Team	W	L	Pct.	GB	Home	Road
St. Louis Cardinals	100	62	.617	—	50‍–‍31	50‍–‍31
Houston Astros	89	73	.549	11	53‍–‍28	36‍–‍45
Milwaukee Brewers	81	81	.500	19	46‍–‍35	35‍–‍46
Chicago Cubs	79	83	.488	21	38‍–‍43	41‍–‍40
Cincinnati Reds	73	89	.451	27	42‍–‍39	31‍–‍50
Pittsburgh Pirates	67	95	.414	33	34‍–‍47	33‍–‍48

=== Game log ===
2005 Game Log (67–95)
April (8–14)

#	Date	Opponent	Score	Win	Loss	Save	Attendance	Record
1	April 4	Brewers	2–9	Sheets	**Pérez** (0–1)	—	38,016	0–1
2	April 6	Brewers	2–10	Davis	**Wells** (0–1)	—	12,077	0–2
3	April 7	@ Padres	0–1 (12)	Seanez	**White** (0–1)	—	43,538	0–3
4	April 8	@ Padres	3–2	**Fogg** (1–0)	Lawrence	**Mesa** (1)	39,791	1–3
5	April 9	@ Padres	3–11	Williams	**Pérez** (0–2)	—	37,939	1–4
6	April 10	@ Padres	6–3	**Williams** (1–0)	Redding	**Mesa** (2)	33,521	2–4
7	April 11	@ Brewers	2–6	Davis	**Wells** (0–2)	—	42,458	2–5
8	April 12	@ Brewers	4–2	**Redman** (1–0)	Glover	**Mesa** (3)	10,927	3–5
9	April 13	@ Brewers	2–6	De La Rosa	**White** (0–2)	—	11,021	3–6
10	April 15	Cubs	8–5	**Torres** (1–0)	Remlinger	**Mesa** (4)	29,256	4–6
11	April 16	Cubs	3–4	Dempster	**Wells** (0–3)	Hawkins	34,783	4–7
12	April 17	Cubs	2–4	Wuertz	**Redman** (1–1)	Hawkins	20,416	4–8
13	April 18	Cardinals	1–11	Mulder	**Williams** (1–1)	—	11,220	4–9
14	April 19	Cardinals	1–7	Morris	**Fogg** (1–1)	—	12,285	4–10
15	April 20	@ Reds	4–6	Wilson	**Torres** (1–1)	Graves	16,857	4–11
16	April 21	@ Reds	4–2	**Wells** (1–3)	Milton	**Mesa** (5)	16,218	5–11
17	April 23	@ Cubs	4–3	**Grabow** (1–0)	Hawkins	**Mesa** (6)	37,695	6–11
18	April 24	@ Cubs	2–5	Wood	**Williams** (1–2)	Fox	37,452	6–12
19	April 25	Astros	2–0	**Pérez** (1–2)	Oswalt	**Mesa** (7)	8,413	7–12
20	April 27	Astros	2–0	**Wells** (2–3)	Pettitte	**Mesa** (8)	13,426	8–12
21	April 29	Giants	2–3	Tomko	**Redman** (1–2)	—	24,209	8–13
22	April 30	Giants	6–7	Walker	**Williams** (1–3)	Brower	23,972	8–14

May (15–13)

#	Date	Opponent	Score	Win	Loss	Save	Attendance	Record
23	May 1	Giants	3–8	Hennessey	**Pérez** (1–3)	—	22,100	8–15
24	May 2	@ Astros	4–11	Pettitte	**Fogg** (1–2)	—	23,882	8–16
25	May 3	@ Astros	7–4	**White** (1–2)	Qualls	**Mesa** (9)	27,809	9–16
26	May 4	@ Astros	6–4	**Torres** (2–1)	Lidge	**Mesa** (10)	29,299	10–16
27	May 5	@ Diamondbacks	6–2	**Williams** (2–3)	Estes	—	18,906	11–16
28	May 6	@ Diamondbacks	4–8	Vazquez	**Pérez** (1–4)	—	24,056	11–17
29	May 7	@ Diamondbacks	3–2	**Fogg** (2–2)	Ortiz	**Mesa** (11)	32,879	12–17
30	May 8	@ Diamondbacks	16–2	**Wells** (3–3)	Halsey	—	24,526	13–17
31	May 9	@ Giants	1–2	Tomko	**Redman** (1–3)	—	34,037	13–18
32	May 10	@ Giants	5–2	**Williams** (3–3)	Brower	**Mesa** (12)	35,668	14–18
33	May 11	@ Giants	7–2	**Fogg** (3–2)	Lowry	**White** (1)	39,200	15–18
34	May 13	Brewers	3–4	Capuano	**Mesa** (0–1)	Turnbow	23,845	15–19
35	May 14	Brewers	2–0	**Redman** (2–3)	Santos	—	21,772	16–19
36	May 15	Brewers	4–2	**Williams** (4–3)	Glover	**Mesa** (13)	15,134	17–19
37	May 17	Cubs	3–4	Ohman	**Mesa** (0–2)	Dempster	19,701	17–20
38	May 18	Cubs	2–3	Wuertz	**Mesa** (0–3)	Dempster	21,142	17–21
39	May 20	Rockies	9–4	**Redman** (3–3)	Wright	—	31,656	18–21
40	May 21	Rockies	8–3	**Pérez** (2–4)	Jennings	**Gonzalez** (1)	37,504	19–21
41	May 22	Rockies	3–4	Kennedy	**Fogg** (3–3)	Fuentes	20,853	19–22
42	May 23	@ Cardinals	2–4	Carpenter	**Williams** (4–4)	Isringhausen	33,073	19–23
43	May 24	@ Cardinals	1–2 (12)	Reyes	**Mesa** (0–4)	—	36,285	19–24
44	May 25	@ Cardinals	5–11	Mulder	**Redman** (3–4)	—	34,895	19–25
45	May 26	@ Reds	8–4	**Pérez** (3–4)	Ramirez	—	20,513	20–25
46	May 27	@ Reds	5–6	Wagner	**Gonzalez** (0–1)	—	24,370	20–26
47	May 28	@ Reds	9–2	**Williams** (5–4)	Milton	—	30,739	21–26
48	May 29	@ Reds	2–11	Claussen	**Wells** (3–4)	—	26,107	21–27
49	May 30	Marlins	3–2 (10)	**White** (2–2)	Jones	—	17,379	22–27
50	May 31	Marlins	5–4	**Meadows** (1–0)	Bump	**Mesa** (14)	12,553	23–27

June (11–16)

#	Date	Opponent	Score	Win	Loss	Save	Attendance	Record
51	June 1	Marlins	9–1	**Fogg** (4–3)	Moehler	**Torres** (1)	15,487	24–27
52	June 2	Marlins	3–6	Willis	**Williams** (5–5)	Jones	15,105	24–28
53	June 3	Braves	3–1	**Wells** (4–4)	Hudson	**Mesa** (15)	27,643	25–28
54	June 4	Braves	0–1	Foster	**Gonzalez** (0–2)	Reitsma	33,649	25–29
55	June 5	Braves	5–2	**Pérez** (4–4)	Bernero	**Mesa** (16)	28,717	26–29
56	June 6	Orioles	3–4	Julio	**Torres** (2–2)	Ryan	15,860	26–30
57	June 7	Orioles	6–5	**Meadows** (2–0)	Julio	**Mesa** (17)	21,422	27–30
58	June 8	Orioles	6–1	**Wells** (5–4)	Chen	—	37,438	28–30
59	June 10	Devil Rays	7–2	**Redman** (4–4)	Nomo	—	27,517	29–30
60	June 11	Devil Rays	18–2	**Pérez** (5–4)	Kazmir	—	31,113	30–30
61	June 12	Devil Rays	5–7 (13)	Nunez	**Meadows** (2–1)	Orvella	23,240	30–31
62	June 14	@ Yankees	0–9	Mussina	**Wells** (5–5)	—	44,541	30–32
63	June 15	@ Yankees	5–7 (10)	Rivera	**Mesa** (0–5)	—	48,828	30–33
64	June 16	@ Yankees	1–6	Johnson	**Pérez** (5–5)	—	54,734	30–34
65	June 17	@ Red Sox	5–6	Foulke	**White** (2–3)	—	35,377	30–35
66	June 18	@ Red Sox	2–0	**White** (3–3)	Embree	**Mesa** (18)	35,216	31–35
67	June 19	@ Red Sox	0–8	Clement	**Wells** (5–6)	—	35,046	31–36
68	June 20	Nationals	4–7	Hernandez	**Redman** (4–5)	Cordero	21,893	31–37
69	June 21	Nationals	11–4	**Pérez** (6–5)	Drese	—	26,006	32–37
70	June 22	Nationals	4–5	Carrasco	**Gonzalez** (0–3)	Cordero	24,064	32–38
71	June 23	@ Cardinals	11–7	**Williams** (6–5)	Morris	**White** (2)	43,590	33–38
72	June 24	@ Cardinals	1–8	Suppan	**Wells** (5–7)	—	48,184	33–39
73	June 25	@ Cardinals	0–8	Carpenter	**Redman** (4–6)	—	48,413	33–40
74	June 26	@ Cardinals	5–4 (10)	**Grabow** (2–0)	Reyes	**Mesa** (19)	45,050	34–40
75	June 28	@ Nationals	1–2	Drese	**Fogg** (4–4)	Cordero	35,828	34–41
76	June 29	@ Nationals	2–3	Ayala	**Torres** (2–3)	Cordero	31,213	34–42
77	June 30	@ Nationals	5–7	Loaiza	**Wells** (5–8)	Cordero	37,361	34–43

July (10–18)

#	Date	Opponent	Score	Win	Loss	Save	Attendance	Record
78	July 1	@ Brewers	4–8	Wise	**Redman** (4–7)	—	21,804	34–44
79	July 2	@ Brewers	3–5	Bottalico	**Torres** (2–4)	Turnbow	29,052	34–45
80	July 3	@ Brewers	11–10	**Meadows** (3–1)	Phelps	**Mesa** (20)	28,323	35–45
81	July 4	Phillies	1–12	Lidle	**Williams** (6–6)	—	37,259	35–46
82	July 5	Phillies	3–0	**Wells** (6–8)	Madson	—	13,442	36–46
83	July 6	Phillies	0–5	Padilla	**Redman** (4–8)	—	19,961	36–47
84	July 7	Phillies	2–1	**Duke** (1–0)	Myers	**Mesa** (21)	20,942	37–47
85	July 8	Mets	6–5 (10)	**Mesa** (1–5)	Looper	—	32,563	38–47
86	July 9	Mets	11–4	**Williams** (7–6)	Ishii	—	36,708	39–47
87	July 10	Mets	1–6	Martinez	**Wells** (6–9)	—	26,551	39–48
88	July 14	@ Cubs	1–5	Prior	**Redman** (4–9)	—	38,902	39–49
89	July 15	@ Cubs	1–11	Wood	**Fogg** (4–5)	—	39,512	39–50
90	July 16	@ Cubs	3–0	**Duke** (2–0)	Maddux	**Mesa** (22)	39,790	40–50
91	July 17	@ Cubs	2–8	Zambrano	**Wells** (6–10)	—	39,391	40–51
92	July 18	Astros	1–11	Backe	**Williams** (7–7)	—	17,590	40–52
93	July 19	Astros	3–9	Astacio	**Snell** (0–1)	—	—	40–53
94	July 19	Astros	4–6	Rodriguez	**Redman** (4–10)	Lidge	20,552	40–54
95	July 20	Astros	0–8	Pettitte	**Fogg** (4–6)	—	19,769	40–55
96	July 21	Rockies	8–1	**Duke** (3–0)	Francis	—	22,492	41–55
97	July 22	Rockies	3–5 (10)	Fuentes	**Mesa** (1–6)	Cortes	35,262	41–56
98	July 23	Rockies	5–3	**Williams** (8–7)	Kim	**Mesa** (23)	37,778	42–56
99	July 24	Rockies	3–0	**Redman** (5–10)	Chacon	**Mesa** (24)	18,523	43–56
100	July 26	@ Marlins	6–3	**Fogg** (5–6)	Moehler	**Mesa** (25)	26,431	44–56
101	July 27	@ Marlins	1–3	Vargas	**Vogelsong** (0–1)	Jones	21,216	44–57
102	July 28	@ Marlins	0–3	Willis	**Wells** (6–11)	Jones	19,621	44–58
103	July 29	@ Braves	1–2	Ramirez	**Williams** (8–8)	McBride	36,767	44–59
104	July 30	@ Braves	6–9	Davies	**Redman** (5–11)	Reitsma	47,441	44–60
105	July 31	@ Braves	4–5	Smoltz	**Grabow** (2–1)	Reitsma	33,275	44–61

August (11–17)

#	Date	Opponent	Score	Win	Loss	Save	Attendance	Record
106	August 1	@ Braves	4–1	**Duke** (4–0)	Hudson	**Mesa** (26)	25,875	45–61
107	August 2	Padres	3–11	Peavy	**Wells** (6–12)	—	23,624	45–62
108	August 3	Padres	9–8	**Mesa** (2–6)	Otsuka	—	23,274	46–62
109	August 4	Padres	7–12	Lawrence	**Redman** (5–12)	—	21,739	46–63
110	August 5	Dodgers	6–12	Lowe	**Fogg** (5–7)	Schmoll	37,318	46–64
111	August 6	Dodgers	9–4	**Duke** (5–0)	Perez	—	38,579	47–64
112	August 7	Dodgers	4–6	Weaver	**Snell** (0–2)	Schmoll	25,860	47–65
113	August 9	@ Rockies	12–4	**Williams** (9–8)	Acevedo	—	20,683	48–65
114	August 10	@ Rockies	5–6 (10)	Cortes	**White** (3–4)	—	20,135	48–66
115	August 11	@ Rockies	11–3	**Fogg** (6–7)	Francis	—	21,102	49–66
116	August 12	@ Astros	5–6	Wheeler	**White** (3–5)	Lidge	37,524	49–67
117	August 13	@ Astros	1–0	**Torres** (3–4)	Lidge	**Mesa** (27)	43,286	50–67
118	August 14	@ Astros	8–0	**Williams** (10–8)	Astacio	—	36,872	51–67
119	August 16	@ Mets	2–6	Benson	**Redman** (5–13)	—	37,202	51–68
120	August 17	@ Mets	1–5	Glavine	**Fogg** (6–8)	Heilman	28,730	51–69
121	August 18	@ Mets	5–0	**Duke** (6–0)	Zambrano	—	35,653	52–69
122	August 19	@ Phillies	11–2	**Wells** (7–12)	Tejeda	—	32,992	53–69
123	August 20	@ Phillies	1–6	Myers	**Williams** (10–9)	—	43,192	53–70
124	August 21	@ Phillies	3–4	Madson	**White** (3–6)	Wagner	40,689	53–71
125	August 22	Cardinals	1–3	Mulder	**Fogg** (6–9)	Isringhausen	23,751	53–72
126	August 23	Cardinals	10–0	**Torres** (4–4)	Marquis	—	23,948	54–72
127	August 24	Cardinals	3–8	Carpenter	**Wells** (7–13)	—	21,506	54–73
128	August 25	Cardinals	3–6	Morris	**Williams** (10–10)	Isringhausen	24,626	54–74
129	August 26	Reds	1–6	Harang	**Redman** (5–14)	—	28,788	54–75
130	August 27	Reds	2–4 (10)	Weathers	**Mesa** (2–7)	Mercker	23,109	54–76
131	August 28	Reds	2–7	Hudson	**Wells** (7–14)	Coffey	23,495	54–77
132	August 30	@ Brewers	6–0	**Maholm** (1–0)	Davis	—	28,337	55–77
133	August 31	@ Brewers	5–6	Turnbow	**Mesa** (2–8)	—	15,062	55–78

September (10–17)

#	Date	Opponent	Score	Win	Loss	Save	Attendance	Record
134	September 2	Cubs	3–7	Maddux	**Fogg** (6–10)	Dempster	24,976	55–79
135	September 3	Cubs	5–9	Zambrano	**Williams** (10–11)	—	22,909	55–80
136	September 4	Cubs	0–2	Williams	**Wells** (7–15)	Dempster	23,204	55–81
137	September 6	Diamondbacks	2–4 (12)	Valverde	**Grabow** (2–2)	Groom	11,186	55–82
138	September 7	Diamondbacks	2–4	Webb	**Redman** (5–15)	Valverde	12,066	55–83
139	September 8	Diamondbacks	8–7 (12)	**White** (4–6)	Groom	—	10,984	56–83
140	September 9	@ Reds	8–4	**Vogelsong** (1–1)	Hudson	—	19,244	57–83
141	September 10	@ Reds	2–6	Ortiz	**Wells** (7–16)	—	23,510	57–84
142	September 11	@ Reds	3–5	Belisle	**Grabow** (2–3)	Weathers	18,529	57–85
143	September 12	@ Cardinals	3–4	Isringhausen	**Torres** (4–5)	—	40,064	57–86
144	September 13	@ Cardinals	4–5	Thompson	**White** (4–7)	—	40,599	57–87
145	September 14	@ Cardinals	5–3	**Vogelsong** (2–1)	Marquis	**Gonzalez** (2)	40,172	58–87
146	September 16	Reds	2–8	Claussen	**Duke** (6–1)	—	—	58–88
147	September 16	Reds	5–4	**Torres** (5–5)	Weathers	—	22,715	59–88
148	September 17	Reds	4–0	**Maholm** (2–0)	Harang	—	31,174	60–88
149	September 18	Reds	9–7	**Gonzalez** (1–3)	Belisle	—	21,320	61–88
150	September 19	Astros	7–0	**Snell** (1–2)	Clemens	—	13,865	62–88
151	September 20	Astros	4–7	Pettitte	**Gorzelanny** (0–1)	—	12,927	62–89
152	September 21	Astros	8–12	Oswalt	**Wells** (7–17)	—	16,266	62–90
153	September 22	Astros	1–2	Backe	**Duke** (6–2)	Lidge	12,587	62–91
154	September 23	@ Dodgers	3–4	Houlton	**Maholm** (2–1)	Sanchez	40,170	62–92
155	September 24	@ Dodgers	8–3	**Pérez** (7–5)	Perez	—	45,730	63–92
156	September 25	@ Dodgers	2–9	Lowe	**Fogg** (6–11)	—	37,846	63–93
157	September 26	@ Dodgers	4–9	Jackson	**Wells** (7–18)	—	36,397	63–94
158	September 27	@ Cubs	5–3	**Duke** (7–2)	Maddux	**Torres** (2)	38,440	64–94
159	September 28	@ Cubs	3–2	**Maholm** (3–1)	Prior	**Gonzalez** (3)	37,491	65–94
160	September 30	Brewers	5–6	Lehr	**Vogelsong** (2–2)	Turnbow	20,922	65–95

October (2–0)

#	Date	Opponent	Score	Win	Loss	Save	Attendance	Record
161	October 1	Brewers	5–1	**Wells** (8–18)	Ohka	—	17,261	66–95
162	October 2	Brewers	3–1	**Duke** (8–2)	Capuano	**Torres** (3)	23,008	67–95

Legend: = Win = Loss
Bold = Pirates team member

=== Record vs. opponents ===
2005 National League record Source: MLB Standings Grid – 2005
Team	AZ	ATL	CHC	CIN	COL	FLA	HOU	LAD	MIL	NYM	PHI	PIT	SD	SF	STL	WAS	AL
Arizona	—	3–3	5–2	2–4	11–7	2–4	3–3	13–5	2–4	1–6	3–4	3–4	10–9	7–11	2–5	2–4	8–10
Atlanta	3–3	—	6–1	7–3	2–4	10–8	5–1	3–3	3–3	13–6	9–10	4–3	1–5	4–2	3–3	10–9	7–8
Chicago	2–5	1–6	—	6–9	4–3	5–4	9–7	4–2	7–9	2–4	2–4	11–5	4–3	5–2	10–6	1–5	6–9
Cincinnati	4–2	3–7	9–6	—	3–3	2–4	4–12	3–4	6–10	3–3	3–4	9–7	4–2	3–5	5–11	5–1	7-8
Colorado	7–11	4–2	3–4	3–3	—	3–3	1–5	11–8	1–5	3–4	2–4	3–7	7–11	7–11	4–4	2–4	6–9
Florida	4–2	8–10	4–5	4–2	3–3	—	4–3	5–2	3–4	8–10	9–10	3–4	2–4	4–2	3–4	9–9	10–5
Houston	3–3	1–5	7–9	12–4	5–1	3-4	—	4–2	10–5	5–5	6–0	9–7	4–3	3–4	5–11	5–2	7–8
Los Angeles	5–13	3–3	2–4	4–3	8–11	2–5	2–4	—	5–1	3–3	3–3	5–2	11–7	9–10	2–5	2–4	5–13
Milwaukee	4–2	3–3	9–7	10–6	5–1	4–3	5–10	1–5	—	3–3	4–5	9–7	3–4	4–3	5–11	4–4	8–7
New York	6–1	6–13	4–2	3–3	4–3	10–8	5–5	3–3	3–3	—	11–7	3–3	4–2	3–3	2–5	11–8	5–10
Philadelphia	4-3	10–9	4–2	4–3	4–2	10–9	0–6	3–3	5–4	7–11	—	4–3	6–0	5–1	4–2	11–8	7–8
Pittsburgh	4–3	3–4	5–11	7–9	7–3	4–3	7–9	2–5	7–9	3–3	3–4	—	3–4	2–4	4–12	1–5	5–7
San Diego	9–10	5–1	3–4	2–4	11–7	4–2	3–4	7–11	4–3	2–4	0–6	4–3	—	12–6	4–3	5–1	7–11
San Francisco	11–7	2–4	2–5	5–3	11–7	2–4	4–3	10–9	3–4	3–3	1–5	4–2	6–12	—	2–4	3–3	6–12
St. Louis	5–2	3–3	6–10	11–5	4–4	4-3	11–5	5–2	11–5	5–2	2–4	12–4	3–4	4–2	—	4–2	10–5
Washington	4–2	9–10	5–1	1–5	4–2	9-9	2–5	4–2	4–4	8–11	8–11	5–1	1–5	3–3	2–4	—	12–6

=== Detailed records ===
**National League**
Opponent	W	L	WP	RS	RA
**NL East**
Atlanta Braves	3	4	0.429	23	21
Florida Marlins	4	3	0.571	27	22
New York Mets	3	3	0.500	26	26
Philadelphia Phillies	3	4	0.429	21	30
Washington Nationals	1	5	0.167	27	28
Total	14	19	0.424	124	127
**NL Central**
Chicago Cubs	5	11	0.313	47	75
Cincinnati Reds	7	9	0.438	70	82
Houston Astros	7	9	0.438	63	80
Milwaukee Brewers	7	9	0.438	63	76
St. Louis Cardinals	4	12	0.250	56	91
Total	30	50	0.375	299	404
**NL West**
Arizona Diamondbacks	4	3	0.571	41	29
Colorado Rockies	7	3	0.700	67	33
Los Angeles Dodgers	2	5	0.286	36	47
San Diego Padres	3	4	0.429	31	48
San Francisco Giants	2	4	0.333	24	24
Total	18	19	0.486	199	181
**American League**
Baltimore Orioles	2	1	0.667	15	10
Boston Red Sox	1	2	0.333	7	14
New York Yankees	0	3	0.000	6	22
Tampa Bay Devil Rays	2	1	0.667	30	11
Total	5	7	0.417	58	57
Season Total	67	95	0.414	680	769

Month	Games	Won	Lost	Win %	RS	RA
April	22	8	14	0.364	65	107
May	28	15	13	0.536	136	117
June	27	11	16	0.407	122	123
July	28	10	18	0.357	94	148
August	28	11	17	0.393	140	136
September	27	10	17	0.370	115	136
October	2	2	0	1.000	8	2
Total	162	67	95	0.414	680	769

	Games	Won	Lost	Win %	RS	RA
Home	81	34	47	0.420	344	390
Away	81	33	48	0.407	336	379
Total	162	67	95	0.414	680	769

== Roster ==
2005 Pittsburgh Pirates
Roster
Pitchers: 60 Bryan Bullington; 62 Matt Capps; 57 Zach Duke; 27 Josh Fogg; 51 Mike Gonzalez; 61 Tom Gorzelanny; 39 John Grabow; 37 Mike Johnston; 30 Paul Maholm; 46 Brian Meadows; 49 José Mesa; 48 Óliver Pérez; 55 Mark Redman; 53 Ian Snell; 16 Salomón Torres; 22 Ryan Vogelsong; 32 Kip Wells; 88,00 Rick White; 58 Dave Williams	Catchers: 11 Humberto Cota; 41 Ryan Doumit; 56 Ronny Paulino; 29 David Ross; 34 Benito Santiago; Infielders: 6 Alfredo Amézaga; 7 José Bautista; 14 José Castillo; 35 Brad Eldred; 66 J. J. Furmaniak; 17 Bobby Hill; 3 Rob Mackowiak; 12 Freddy Sanchez; 31 Daryle Ward; 19 Ty Wigginton; 2 Jack Wilson	Outfielders: 38 Jason Bay; 26 Chris Duffy; 50 Matt Lawton; 59 Nate McLouth; 5 Tike Redman; 34 Michael Restovich; 43 Ray Sadler; 36 Craig Wilson	Manager: 25 Pete Mackanin; 23 Lloyd McClendon; Coaches: 10 Álvaro Espinoza (infield); 15 Rusty Kuntz (first base); 25 Pete Mackanin (bench); 28 Gerald Perry (hitting); 13 John Russell (third base); 52 Bruce Tanner (bullpen); 54 Spin Williams (pitching)

=== Opening Day lineup ===
Opening Day Starters
Name	Position
Matt Lawton	RF
Jack Wilson	SS
Tike Redman	CF
Jason Bay	LF
Daryle Ward	1B
Ty Wigginton	3B
José Castillo	2B
Benito Santiago	C
Óliver Pérez	SP

== Awards and honors ==
2005 Major League Baseball All-Star Game

- Jason Bay, OF, reserve

== Statistics ==
Hitting

Note: G = Games played; AB = At bats; H = Hits; Avg. = Batting average; HR = Home runs; RBI = Runs batted in

Regular season
Player	G	AB	H	Avg.	HR	RBI
R. Paulino	2	4	2	0.500	0	0
S. Torres	75	4	2	0.500	0	0
C. Duffy	39	126	43	0.341	1	9
J. Bay	162	599	183	0.306	32	101
F. Sanchez	132	453	132	0.291	5	35
M. Lawton	101	374	102	0.273	10	44
R. Mackowiak	142	463	126	0.272	9	58
B. Hill	58	93	25	0.269	0	11
J. Castillo	101	370	99	0.268	11	53
C. Wilson	59	197	52	0.264	5	22
B. Santiago	6	23	6	0.261	0	0
D. Ward	133	407	106	0.260	12	63
T. Wigginton	57	155	40	0.258	7	25
J. Wilson	158	587	151	0.257	8	52
N. McLouth	41	109	28	0.257	5	12
R. Doumit	75	231	59	0.255	6	35
T. Redman	135	319	80	0.251	2	26
R. Sadler	3	8	2	0.250	1	1
H. Cota	93	297	72	0.242	7	43
J. Gerut	4	18	4	0.222	0	2
D. Ross	40	108	24	0.222	3	15
B. Eldred	55	190	42	0.221	12	27
M. Restovich	52	84	18	0.214	2	5
J. Furmaniak	13	26	5	0.192	0	1
Ó. Pérez	19	33	6	0.182	0	3
K. Wells	32	57	9	0.158	1	2
J. Bautista	11	28	4	0.143	0	1
Z. Duke	14	28	4	0.143	0	1
P. Maholm	6	15	2	0.133	0	0
D. Williams	24	42	5	0.119	0	4
M. Redman	29	53	6	0.113	0	2
R. Vogelsong	41	9	1	0.111	0	0
J. Fogg	33	47	5	0.106	0	3
A. Amézaga	3	3	0	0.000	0	0
T. Gorzelanny	3	1	0	0.000	0	0
B. Meadows	63	1	0	0.000	0	0
J. Mesa	53	1	0	0.000	0	0
I. Snell	15	8	0	0.000	0	0
R. White	68	2	0	0.000	0	0
B. Bullington	1	0	0	—	0	0
M. Capps	4	0	0	—	0	0
M. Gonzalez	49	0	0	—	0	0
J. Grabow	61	0	0	—	0	0
M. Johnston	1	0	0	—	0	0
Team totals	162	5,573	1,445	0.259	139	656

Pitching

Note: G = Games pitched; IP = Innings pitched; W = Wins; L = Losses; ERA = Earned run average; SO = Strikeouts

Regular season
Player	G	IP	W	L	ERA	SO
Z. Duke	14	84 2/3	8	2	1.81	58
P. Maholm	6	41 1/3	3	1	2.18	26
M. Gonzalez	51	50	1	3	2.70	58
S. Torres	78	94 2/3	5	5	2.76	55
R. White	71	75	4	7	3.72	40
D. Williams	25	138 2/3	10	11	4.41	88
R. Vogelsong	44	81 1/3	2	2	4.43	52
M. Capps	4	4	0	0	4.50	3
B. Meadows	65	74 2/3	3	1	4.58	44
J. Mesa	55	56 2/3	2	8	4.76	37
J. Grabow	63	52	2	3	4.85	42
M. Redman	30	178 1/3	5	15	4.90	101
J. Fogg	34	169 1/3	6	11	5.05	85
K. Wells	33	182	8	18	5.09	132
I. Snell	15	42	1	2	5.14	34
Ó. Pérez	20	103	7	5	5.85	97
T. Gorzelanny	3	6	0	1	12.00	3
B. Bullington	1	1 1/3	0	0	13.50	1
M. Johnston	1	1	0	0	36.00	2
Team totals	162	1,436	67	95	4.42	958

== Farm system ==
Level	Team	League	Manager
AAA	Indianapolis Indians	International League	Trent Jewett
AA	Altoona Curve	Eastern League	Tony Beasley
A	Lynchburg Hillcats	Carolina League	Tim Leiper
A	Hickory Crawdads	South Atlantic League	Jeff Branson
A-Short Season	Williamsport Crosscutters	New York–Penn League	Tom Prince
Rookie	GCL Pirates	Gulf Coast League	Jeff Livesey
