= 2005 San Francisco Giants season =

2005 San Francisco Giants
- League: National League
- Division: West
- Ballpark: SBC Park
- City: San Francisco, California
- Record: 75–87 (.463)
- Divisional place: 3rd
- Owners: Peter Magowan
- General managers: Brian Sabean
- Managers: Felipe Alou
- Television: KTVU (Jon Miller, Greg Papa, Mike Krukow, Duane Kuiper); FSN Bay Area (Mike Krukow, Duane Kuiper)
- Radio: KNBR (Greg Papa, Dave Flemming, Jon Miller, Duane Kuiper); KLOK (Tito Fuentes, Erwin Higueros, Amaury Pi-Gonzalez)

The 2005 San Francisco Giants season was the Giants' 123rd year in Major League Baseball, their 48th year in San Francisco since their move from New York following the 1957 season, and their sixth at SBC Park. The team finished in third place in the National League West with a 75–87 record, 7 games behind the San Diego Padres.

On July 14, 2005, the Giants won their 10,000th game, defeating the rival Dodgers, 4–3. The Giants became the first professional sports franchise to have a five-figure win total.

== Offseason ==
December 16, 2004: A. J. Pierzynski was released by the San Francisco Giants.

== Regular season ==
=== Opening Day starters ===
- Edgardo Alfonzo
- Moisés Alou
- Ray Durham
- Pedro Feliz
- Marquis Grissom
- Mike Matheny
- Jason Schmidt
- J. T. Snow
- Omar Vizquel

=== Season standings ===
==== National League West ====
NL West
| Team | W | L | Pct. | GB | Home | Road |
|---|---|---|---|---|---|---|
| San Diego Padres | 82 | 80 | .506 | — | 46‍–‍35 | 36‍–‍45 |
| Arizona Diamondbacks | 77 | 85 | .475 | 5 | 36‍–‍45 | 41‍–‍40 |
| San Francisco Giants | 75 | 87 | .463 | 7 | 37‍–‍44 | 38‍–‍43 |
| Los Angeles Dodgers | 71 | 91 | .438 | 11 | 40‍–‍41 | 31‍–‍50 |
| Colorado Rockies | 67 | 95 | .414 | 15 | 40‍–‍41 | 27‍–‍54 |

==== Record vs. opponents ====
2005 National League record Source: MLB Standings Grid – 2005
| Team | AZ | ATL | CHC | CIN | COL | FLA | HOU | LAD | MIL | NYM | PHI | PIT | SD | SF | STL | WAS | AL |
|---|---|---|---|---|---|---|---|---|---|---|---|---|---|---|---|---|---|
| Arizona | — | 3–3 | 5–2 | 2–4 | 11–7 | 2–4 | 3–3 | 13–5 | 2–4 | 1–6 | 3–4 | 3–4 | 10–9 | 7–11 | 2–5 | 2–4 | 8–10 |
| Atlanta | 3–3 | — | 6–1 | 7–3 | 2–4 | 10–8 | 5–1 | 3–3 | 3–3 | 13–6 | 9–10 | 4–3 | 1–5 | 4–2 | 3–3 | 10–9 | 7–8 |
| Chicago | 2–5 | 1–6 | — | 6–9 | 4–3 | 5–4 | 9–7 | 4–2 | 7–9 | 2–4 | 2–4 | 11–5 | 4–3 | 5–2 | 10–6 | 1–5 | 6–9 |
| Cincinnati | 4–2 | 3–7 | 9–6 | — | 3–3 | 2–4 | 4–12 | 3–4 | 6–10 | 3–3 | 3–4 | 9–7 | 4–2 | 3–5 | 5–11 | 5–1 | 7-8 |
| Colorado | 7–11 | 4–2 | 3–4 | 3–3 | — | 3–3 | 1–5 | 11–8 | 1–5 | 3–4 | 2–4 | 3–7 | 7–11 | 7–11 | 4–4 | 2–4 | 6–9 |
| Florida | 4–2 | 8–10 | 4–5 | 4–2 | 3–3 | — | 4–3 | 5–2 | 3–4 | 8–10 | 9–10 | 3–4 | 2–4 | 4–2 | 3–4 | 9–9 | 10–5 |
| Houston | 3–3 | 1–5 | 7–9 | 12–4 | 5–1 | 3-4 | — | 4–2 | 10–5 | 5–5 | 6–0 | 9–7 | 4–3 | 3–4 | 5–11 | 5–2 | 7–8 |
| Los Angeles | 5–13 | 3–3 | 2–4 | 4–3 | 8–11 | 2–5 | 2–4 | — | 5–1 | 3–3 | 3–3 | 5–2 | 11–7 | 9–10 | 2–5 | 2–4 | 5–13 |
| Milwaukee | 4–2 | 3–3 | 9–7 | 10–6 | 5–1 | 4–3 | 5–10 | 1–5 | — | 3–3 | 4–5 | 9–7 | 3–4 | 4–3 | 5–11 | 4–4 | 8–7 |
| New York | 6–1 | 6–13 | 4–2 | 3–3 | 4–3 | 10–8 | 5–5 | 3–3 | 3–3 | — | 11–7 | 3–3 | 4–2 | 3–3 | 2–5 | 11–8 | 5–10 |
| Philadelphia | 4-3 | 10–9 | 4–2 | 4–3 | 4–2 | 10–9 | 0–6 | 3–3 | 5–4 | 7–11 | — | 4–3 | 6–0 | 5–1 | 4–2 | 11–8 | 7–8 |
| Pittsburgh | 4–3 | 3–4 | 5–11 | 7–9 | 7–3 | 4–3 | 7–9 | 2–5 | 7–9 | 3–3 | 3–4 | — | 3–4 | 2–4 | 4–12 | 1–5 | 5–7 |
| San Diego | 9–10 | 5–1 | 3–4 | 2–4 | 11–7 | 4–2 | 3–4 | 7–11 | 4–3 | 2–4 | 0–6 | 4–3 | — | 12–6 | 4–3 | 5–1 | 7–11 |
| San Francisco | 11–7 | 2–4 | 2–5 | 5–3 | 11–7 | 2–4 | 4–3 | 10–9 | 3–4 | 3–3 | 1–5 | 4–2 | 6–12 | — | 2–4 | 3–3 | 6–12 |
| St. Louis | 5–2 | 3–3 | 6–10 | 11–5 | 4–4 | 4-3 | 11–5 | 5–2 | 11–5 | 5–2 | 2–4 | 12–4 | 3–4 | 4–2 | — | 4–2 | 10–5 |
| Washington | 4–2 | 9–10 | 5–1 | 1–5 | 4–2 | 9-9 | 2–5 | 4–2 | 4–4 | 8–11 | 8–11 | 5–1 | 1–5 | 3–3 | 2–4 | — | 12–6 |

=== Transactions ===
- July 30, 2005: Yorvit Torrealba was traded by the San Francisco Giants with Jesse Foppert to the Seattle Mariners for Randy Winn.
- August 14, 2005: Kirk Rueter was released by the San Francisco Giants.

=== Roster ===
2005 San Francisco Giants
Roster
| Pitchers: 59 Jeremy Accardo; 49 Armando Benítez; 38 Jim Brower; 43 Matt Cain; 40 Jason Christiansen; 52 Brian Cooper; 53 Kevin Correia; 47 Scott Eyre; 14 Jeff Fassero; 34 Jesse Foppert; 32 LaTroy Hawkins; 41 Brad Hennessey; 48 Matt Herges; 38 Matt Kinney; 33 Al Levine; 51 Noah Lowry; 54 Scott Munter; 38 Brandon Puffer; 46 Kirk Rueter; 29 Jason Schmidt; 48,37 Jack Taschner; 50,35 Brett Tomko; 45 Tyler Walker; 57 Jerome Williams | Catchers: 8 Yamid Haad; 33 Justin Knoedler; 22 Mike Matheny; 8 Yorvit Torrealba; Infielders: 12 Edgardo Alfonzo; 1 Ángel Chávez; 35 Deivi Cruz; 2 Brian Dallimore; 5 Ray Durham; 7 Pedro Feliz; 36,28 Lance Niekro; 6 J. T. Snow; 13 Omar Vizquel | Outfielders: 18 Moisés Alou; 25 Barry Bonds; 56,21 Jason Ellison; 9 Marquis Grissom; 39 Todd Linden; 34 Daniel Ortmeier; 57 Julio Ramírez; 21 Alex Sánchez; 1 Adam Shabala; 21 Tony Torcato; 20 Michael Tucker; 2 Randy Winn; Other batters: 40 Doug Clark | Manager: 23 Felipe Alou; Coaches: 26 Mark Gardner (bullpen); 15 Gene Glynn (third base); 58 Bill Hayes (bullpen catcher); 16 Joe Lefebvre (hitting); 55 Luis Pujols (first base); 19 Dave Righetti (pitching); 10 Ron Wotus (bench) |

== Player stats ==
=== Batting ===
==== Starters by position ====
Note: Pos = Position; G = Games played; AB = At bats; H = Hits; Avg. = Batting average; HR = Home runs; RBI = Runs batted in

| Pos | Player | G | AB | H | Avg. | HR | RBI |
|---|---|---|---|---|---|---|---|
| C | Mike Matheny | 134 | 443 | 107 | .242 | 13 | 59 |
| 1B | J.T. Snow | 117 | 367 | 101 | .275 | 4 | 40 |
| 2B | Ray Durham | 142 | 497 | 144 | .290 | 12 | 62 |
| SS | Omar Vizquel | 152 | 568 | 154 | .271 | 3 | 45 |
| 3B | Edgardo Alfonzo | 109 | 368 | 102 | .277 | 2 | 43 |
| LF | Pedro Feliz | 156 | 569 | 142 | .250 | 20 | 81 |
| CF | Jason Ellison | 131 | 352 | 93 | .264 | 4 | 24 |
| RF | Michael Tucker | 104 | 250 | 60 | .240 | 5 | 33 |

==== Other batters ====
Note: G = Games played; AB = At bats; H = Hits; Avg. = Batting average; HR = Home runs; RBI = Runs batted in

| Player | G | AB | H | Avg. | HR | RBI |
|---|---|---|---|---|---|---|
| Moisés Alou | 123 | 427 | 137 | .321 | 19 | 63 |
| Lance Niekro | 113 | 278 | 70 | .252 | 12 | 46 |
| Randy Winn | 58 | 231 | 83 | .359 | 14 | 26 |
| Deivi Cruz | 81 | 209 | 56 | .268 | 5 | 19 |
| Todd Linden | 60 | 171 | 37 | .216 | 4 | 13 |
| Marquis Grissom | 44 | 137 | 29 | .212 | 2 | 15 |
| Yorvit Torrealba | 34 | 93 | 21 | .226 | 1 | 7 |
| Alex Sánchez | 19 | 43 | 11 | .256 | 0 | 3 |
| Barry Bonds | 14 | 42 | 12 | .286 | 5 | 10 |
| Yamid Haad | 17 | 28 | 2 | .071 | 0 | 1 |
| Daniel Ortmeier | 15 | 22 | 3 | .136 | 0 | 1 |
| Angel Chávez | 10 | 19 | 5 | .263 | 0 | 1 |
| Adam Shabala | 6 | 15 | 3 | .200 | 0 | 4 |
| Tony Torcato | 11 | 11 | 3 | .273 | 0 | 0 |
| Justin Knoedler | 8 | 10 | 1 | .100 | 0 | 0 |
| Brian Dallimore | 7 | 7 | 1 | .143 | 0 | 0 |
| Doug Clark | 8 | 5 | 0 | .000 | 0 | 0 |
| Julio Ramírez | 12 | 4 | 1 | .250 | 0 | 1 |

=== Pitching ===
==== Starting pitchers ====
Note: G = Games pitched; IP = Innings pitched; W = Wins; L = Losses; ERA = Earned run average; SO = Strikeouts

| Player | G | IP | W | L | ERA | SO |
|---|---|---|---|---|---|---|
| Noah Lowry | 33 | 204.2 | 13 | 13 | 3.78 | 172 |
| Brett Tomko | 33 | 190.2 | 8 | 15 | 4.48 | 114 |
| Jason Schmidt | 29 | 172.0 | 12 | 7 | 4.40 | 165 |
| Brad Hennessey | 21 | 118.1 | 5 | 8 | 4.64 | 64 |
| Kirk Reuter | 20 | 107.1 | 2 | 7 | 5.95 | 25 |
| Matt Cain | 7 | 46.1 | 2 | 1 | 2.33 | 30 |
| Jerome Williams | 4 | 16.2 | 0 | 2 | 6.48 | 11 |

==== Other pitchers ====
Note: G = Games pitched; IP = Innings pitched; W = Wins; L = Losses; ERA = Earned run average; SO = Strikeouts

| Player | G | IP | W | L | ERA | SO |
|---|---|---|---|---|---|---|
| Kevin Correia | 16 | 58.1 | 2 | 5 | 4.63 | 44 |
| Brian Cooper | 8 | 17.2 | 0 | 1 | 3.06 | 7 |
| Matt Kinney | 5 | 12.0 | 2 | 0 | 6.00 | 3 |
| Jesse Foppert | 3 | 10.1 | 0 | 0 | 5.23 | 6 |

===== Relief pitchers =====
Note: G = Games pitched; W = Wins; L = Losses; SV = Saves; ERA = Earned run average; SO = Strikeouts

| Player | G | W | L | SV | ERA | SO |
|---|---|---|---|---|---|---|
| Tyler Walker | 67 | 6 | 4 | 23 | 4.23 | 54 |
| Scott Eyre | 86 | 2 | 2 | 0 | 2.63 | 65 |
| Jason Christiansen | 56 | 6 | 1 | 0 | 5.36 | 17 |
| Jeff Fassero | 48 | 4 | 7 | 0 | 4.05 | 60 |
| Scott Munter | 45 | 2 | 0 | 0 | 2.56 | 11 |
| LaTroy Hawkins | 45 | 1 | 4 | 2 | 4.10 | 30 |
| Jim Brower | 32 | 2 | 1 | 1 | 6.53 | 25 |
| Armando Benítez | 30 | 2 | 3 | 19 | 4.50 | 23 |
| Jeremy Accardo | 28 | 1 | 5 | 0 | 3.94 | 16 |
| Jack Taschner | 24 | 2 | 0 | 0 | 1.59 | 19 |
| Matt Herges | 21 | 1 | 1 | 0 | 4.71 | 6 |
| Al Levine | 9 | 0 | 0 | 0 | 9.58 | 4 |
| Brandon Puffer | 3 | 0 | 0 | 0 | 10.29 | 1 |

== Awards and honors ==
- Mike Matheny, C, Willie Mac Award

All-Star Game

- Moises Alou

== Farm system ==
| Level | Team | League | Manager |
|---|---|---|---|
| AAA | Fresno Grizzlies | Pacific Coast League | Shane Turner |
| AA | Norwich Navigators | Eastern League | Dave Machemer |
| A | San Jose Giants | California League | Lenn Sakata |
| A | Augusta GreenJackets | South Atlantic League | Roberto Kelly |
| A-Short Season | Salem-Keizer Volcanoes | Northwest League | Steve Decker |
| Rookie | AZL Giants | Arizona League | Bert Hunter |

LEAGUE CHAMPIONS: San Jose, AZL Giants
