= 2005 Florida Marlins season =

2005 Florida Marlins
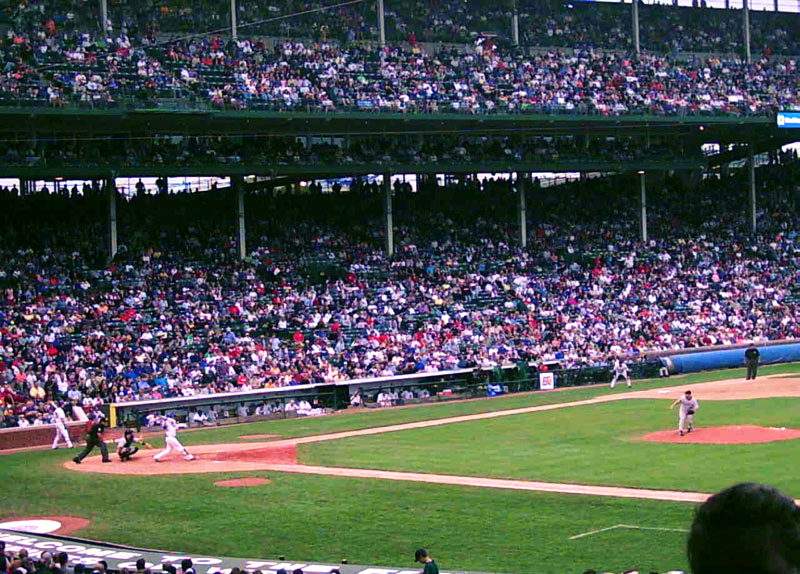
- 2005-06-15 Wrigley Field Cubs vs Marlins
- League: National League
- Division: East
- Ballpark: Dolphin Stadium
- City: Miami Gardens, Florida
- Record: 83–79 (.512)
- Divisional place: 3rd
- Owners: Jeffrey Loria
- General managers: Larry Beinfest
- Managers: Jack McKeon
- Television: FSN Florida; WPXM/WPXP (Rich Waltz, Tommy Hutton)
- Radio: WQAM (Dave Van Horne, Roxy Bernstein); WQBA (Spanish) (Felo Ramírez, Luis Quintana)

The 2005 Florida Marlins season was the 13th season for the Major League Baseball (MLB) franchise in the National League. It would begin with the team attempting to improve on their season from 2004. Their manager was Jack McKeon. They played home games at Dolphin Stadium. They finished with a record of 83–79, third in the National League East and failed to make the playoffs for the second consecutive season.

On September 30, the Marlins defeated the Atlanta Braves for their 81st win of the season. With every other team in the division having won at least 81 games, this guaranteed that for the first time in baseball history, all the teams in a division would finish the season at .500 or better.

== Offseason ==
- October 8, 2004: Billy Koch was released by the Florida Marlins.
- January 26, 2005: Carlos Delgado was signed as a free agent with the Florida Marlins.

== Regular season ==
=== Season standings ===
==== National League East ====
NL East
Team	W	L	Pct.	GB	Home	Road
Atlanta Braves	90	72	.556	—	53‍–‍28	37‍–‍44
Philadelphia Phillies	88	74	.543	2	46‍–‍35	42‍–‍39
Florida Marlins	83	79	.512	7	45‍–‍36	38‍–‍43
New York Mets	83	79	.512	7	48‍–‍33	35‍–‍46
Washington Nationals	81	81	.500	9	41‍–‍40	40‍–‍41

==== Record vs. opponents ====
2005 National League record Source: MLB Standings Grid – 2005
Team	AZ	ATL	CHC	CIN	COL	FLA	HOU	LAD	MIL	NYM	PHI	PIT	SD	SF	STL	WAS	AL
Arizona	—	3–3	5–2	2–4	11–7	2–4	3–3	13–5	2–4	1–6	3–4	3–4	10–9	7–11	2–5	2–4	8–10
Atlanta	3–3	—	6–1	7–3	2–4	10–8	5–1	3–3	3–3	13–6	9–10	4–3	1–5	4–2	3–3	10–9	7–8
Chicago	2–5	1–6	—	6–9	4–3	5–4	9–7	4–2	7–9	2–4	2–4	11–5	4–3	5–2	10–6	1–5	6–9
Cincinnati	4–2	3–7	9–6	—	3–3	2–4	4–12	3–4	6–10	3–3	3–4	9–7	4–2	3–5	5–11	5–1	7-8
Colorado	7–11	4–2	3–4	3–3	—	3–3	1–5	11–8	1–5	3–4	2–4	3–7	7–11	7–11	4–4	2–4	6–9
Florida	4–2	8–10	4–5	4–2	3–3	—	4–3	5–2	3–4	8–10	9–10	3–4	2–4	4–2	3–4	9–9	10–5
Houston	3–3	1–5	7–9	12–4	5–1	3-4	—	4–2	10–5	5–5	6–0	9–7	4–3	3–4	5–11	5–2	7–8
Los Angeles	5–13	3–3	2–4	4–3	8–11	2–5	2–4	—	5–1	3–3	3–3	5–2	11–7	9–10	2–5	2–4	5–13
Milwaukee	4–2	3–3	9–7	10–6	5–1	4–3	5–10	1–5	—	3–3	4–5	9–7	3–4	4–3	5–11	4–4	8–7
New York	6–1	6–13	4–2	3–3	4–3	10–8	5–5	3–3	3–3	—	11–7	3–3	4–2	3–3	2–5	11–8	5–10
Philadelphia	4-3	10–9	4–2	4–3	4–2	10–9	0–6	3–3	5–4	7–11	—	4–3	6–0	5–1	4–2	11–8	7–8
Pittsburgh	4–3	3–4	5–11	7–9	7–3	4–3	7–9	2–5	7–9	3–3	3–4	—	3–4	2–4	4–12	1–5	5–7
San Diego	9–10	5–1	3–4	2–4	11–7	4–2	3–4	7–11	4–3	2–4	0–6	4–3	—	12–6	4–3	5–1	7–11
San Francisco	11–7	2–4	2–5	5–3	11–7	2–4	4–3	10–9	3–4	3–3	1–5	4–2	6–12	—	2–4	3–3	6–12
St. Louis	5–2	3–3	6–10	11–5	4–4	4-3	11–5	5–2	11–5	5–2	2–4	12–4	3–4	4–2	—	4–2	10–5
Washington	4–2	9–10	5–1	1–5	4–2	9-9	2–5	4–2	4–4	8–11	8–11	5–1	1–5	3–3	2–4	—	12–6

=== Roster ===
2005 Florida Marlins
Roster
Pitchers: 57 Antonio Alfonseca; 49 Yorman Bazardo; 21 Josh Beckett; 27 Chad Bentz; 40 Nate Bump; 34 A. J. Burnett; 37 Frank Castillo; 52 Jim Crowell; 26 Valerio de los Santos; 55 Josh Johnson; 50 Todd Jones; 54 Logan Kensing; 22 Al Leiter; 45 Jim Mecir; 23 Randy Messenger; 36 Brian Moehler; 59 Guillermo Mota; 48 Scott Olsen; 46 Matt Perisho; 48 Paul Quantrill; 51 Chris Resop; 41 John Riedling; 32 Travis Smith; 31 Ismael Valdez; 56 Jason Vargas; 49 Ron Villone; 35 Dontrelle Willis	Catchers: 22 Ryan Jorgensen; 16 Paul Lo Duca; 6 Matt Treanor; Infielders: 4 Robert Andino; 1 Luis Castillo; 18 Jeff Conine; 25 Carlos Delgado; 29 Joe Dillon; 2 Damion Easley; 11 Álex González; 19 Mike Lowell; 12 Mike Mordecai; 20 Josh Wilson	Outfielders: 3 Chris Aguila; 24 Miguel Cabrera; 43 Juan Encarnación; 27 Jeremy Hermida; 9 Juan Pierre; 14 Josh Willingham; Other batters: 10 Lenny Harris	Manager: 15 Jack McKeon; Coaches: 67 Pierre Arsenault (bullpen); 47 Jeff Cox (third base); 30 Luis Dorante (bullpen); 33 Harry Dunlop (bench); 7 Perry Hill (first base); 28 Bill Robinson (hitting); 38 Mark Wiley (pitching)

== Player stats ==
= Indicates team leader

=== Batting ===
==== Starters by position ====
Note: Pos = Position; G = Games played; AB = At bats; H = Hits; Avg. = Batting average; HR = Home runs; RBI = Runs batted in

Pos	Player	G	AB	H	Avg.	HR	RBI
C	Paul Lo Duca	132	445	126	.283	6	57
1B	Carlos Delgado	144	521	157	.301	33	115
2B	Luis Castillo	122	439	132	.301	4	30
3B	Mike Lowell	150	500	118	.238	8	58
SS	Álex González	130	435	115	.264	5	45
LF	Miguel Cabrera	158	613	198	.323	33	116
CF	Juan Pierre	162	656	181	.276	2	47
RF	Juan Encarnación	141	506	145	.287	16	76

==== Other batters ====
Note: G = Games played; AB = At bats; H = Hits; Avg. = Batting average; HR = Home runs; RBI = Runs batted in

Player	G	AB	H	Avg.	HR	RBI
Jeff Conine	131	335	102	.304	3	33
Damion Easley	102	267	64	.240	9	30
Matt Treanor	58	134	27	.201	0	13
Chris Aguila	65	78	19	.244	0	4
Lenny Harris	83	70	22	.314	1	13
Robert Andino	17	44	7	.159	0	1
Jeremy Hermida	23	41	12	.293	4	11
Joe Dillon	27	36	6	.167	1	1
Josh Willingham	16	23	7	.304	0	4
Josh Wilson	11	10	1	.100	0	0
Ryan Jorgensen	4	4	0	.000	0	0
Mike Mordecai	2	2	0	.000	0	0

=== Pitching ===
==== Starting pitchers ====
Note: G = Games pitched; IP = Innings pitched; W = Wins; L = Losses; ERA = Earned run average; SO = Strikeouts

Player	G	IP	W	L	ERA	SO
Dontrelle Willis	34	236.1	22	10	2.63	170
A.J. Burnett	32	209.0	12	12	3.44	198
Josh Beckett	29	178.2	15	8	3.38	166
Al Leiter	17	80.0	3	7	6.64	52
Jason Vargas	17	73.2	5	5	4.03	59
Scott Olsen	5	20.1	1	1	3.98	21
Frank Castillo	1	4.1	0	1	10.38	4

==== Other pitchers ====
Note: G = Games pitched; IP = Innings pitched; W = Wins; L = Losses; ERA = Earned run average; SO = Strikeouts

Player	G	IP	W	L	ERA	SO
Brian Moehler	37	158.1	6	12	4.55	95
Ismael Valdez	14	50.2	2	2	5.33	27
Josh Johnson	4	12.1	0	0	3.65	10

==== Relief pitchers ====
Note: G = Games pitched; W = Wins; L = Losses; SV = Saves; ERA = Earned run average; SO = Strikeouts

Player	G	W	L	SV	ERA	SO
Todd Jones	68	1	5	40	2.10	62
Guillermo Mota	56	2	2	2	4.70	60
Jim Mecir	52	1	4	0	3.12	34
Antonio Alfonseca	33	1	1	0	4.94	16
Nate Bump	31	0	3	0	4.03	18
Randy Messenger	29	0	0	0	5.35	29
John Riedling	29	4	1	0	7.16	16
Ron Villone	27	3	2	0	6.85	29
Valerio De Los Santos	27	1	2	0	6.14	16
Matt Perisho	24	2	0	0	1.93	10
Chris Resop	15	2	0	0	8.47	15
Travis Smith	12	0	0	0	6.75	9
Paul Quantrill	6	0	1	0	8.44	1
Jim Crowell	4	0	0	0	21.60	2
Chad Bentz	4	0	0	0	31.50	0
Logan Kensing	3	0	0	0	11.12	4
Yorman Bazardo	1	0	0	0	21.60	2

== Farm system ==
Level	Team	League	Manager
AAA	Albuquerque Isotopes	Pacific Coast League	Dean Treanor
AA	Carolina Mudcats	Southern League	Gary Allenson
A	Jupiter Hammerheads	Florida State League	Tim Cossins
A	Greensboro Grasshoppers	South Atlantic League	Brandon Hyde
A-Short Season	Jamestown Jammers	New York–Penn League	Mike Mordecai
Rookie	GCL Marlins	Gulf Coast League	Edwin Rodríguez
