= 2005 Cincinnati Reds season =

2005 Cincinnati Reds
- League: National League
- Division: Central
- Ballpark: Great American Ball Park
- City: Cincinnati
- Record: 73–89 (.451)
- Divisional place: 5th
- Owners: Carl Lindner
- General managers: Dan O'Brien Jr.
- Managers: Dave Miley, Jerry Narron
- Television: FSN Ohio (George Grande, Chris Welsh)
- Radio: WLW (Marty Brennaman, Joe Nuxhall, Steve Stewart)
- Stats: ESPN.com; Baseball Reference

The 2005 Cincinnati Reds season was the 136th season for the franchise in Major League Baseball, and their third season at Great American Ball Park in Cincinnati. It consisted of the Reds finishing in fifth place in the National League Central and failing to improve on their 76–86 record from 2004. The Reds were managed by Dave Miley for most of the season, and after being fired, was followed by Jerry Narron.

The Reds missed the playoffs for the tenth straight season, tying a record set between 1980 and 1989.

== Offseason ==
- November 15, 2004: Kenny Kelly was signed as a free agent with the Cincinnati Reds.
- December 15, 2004: Dave Weathers was signed as a free agent with the Cincinnati Reds.
- December 27, 2004: Eric Milton was signed as a free agent with the Cincinnati Reds.
- February 4, 2005 Barry Larkin announced his retirement. He played all 19 seasons with the Reds.

== Regular season ==
=== Season information ===
The Reds finished with an overall record of 73–89, 16 games under .500, and in 5th place behind the division winner, the St. Louis Cardinals. They were 27 games behind the Cardinals in their division, and 16 games behind the second place team, the Houston Astros, the eventual National League champions. The Reds finished 8 games behind the third place team, the Milwaukee Brewers, and 6 games behind the fourth place team, the Chicago Cubs. The Reds were six games ahead of the last place team, the Pittsburgh Pirates.

Sean Casey led the team in batting average with an average of .312. Adam Dunn led the team in both home runs and RBI, with 40 and 101, respectively. Aaron Harang led the team in wins with 11. Felipe López was the only Red to make the National League All-Star team.

The Reds finished in 13th out of 16 teams in the National League in attendance. The Reds scored 820 runs and allowed 889 runs. Ken Griffey Jr. led the team in season salary at $12,500,000.

=== Season standings ===
==== National League Central ====
NL Central
Team	W	L	Pct.	GB	Home	Road
St. Louis Cardinals	100	62	.617	—	50‍–‍31	50‍–‍31
Houston Astros	89	73	.549	11	53‍–‍28	36‍–‍45
Milwaukee Brewers	81	81	.500	19	46‍–‍35	35‍–‍46
Chicago Cubs	79	83	.488	21	38‍–‍43	41‍–‍40
Cincinnati Reds	73	89	.451	27	42‍–‍39	31‍–‍50
Pittsburgh Pirates	67	95	.414	33	34‍–‍47	33‍–‍48

==== Record vs. opponents ====
2005 National League record Source: MLB Standings Grid – 2005
Team	AZ	ATL	CHC	CIN	COL	FLA	HOU	LAD	MIL	NYM	PHI	PIT	SD	SF	STL	WAS	AL
Arizona	—	3–3	5–2	2–4	11–7	2–4	3–3	13–5	2–4	1–6	3–4	3–4	10–9	7–11	2–5	2–4	8–10
Atlanta	3–3	—	6–1	7–3	2–4	10–8	5–1	3–3	3–3	13–6	9–10	4–3	1–5	4–2	3–3	10–9	7–8
Chicago	2–5	1–6	—	6–9	4–3	5–4	9–7	4–2	7–9	2–4	2–4	11–5	4–3	5–2	10–6	1–5	6–9
Cincinnati	4–2	3–7	9–6	—	3–3	2–4	4–12	3–4	6–10	3–3	3–4	9–7	4–2	3–5	5–11	5–1	7-8
Colorado	7–11	4–2	3–4	3–3	—	3–3	1–5	11–8	1–5	3–4	2–4	3–7	7–11	7–11	4–4	2–4	6–9
Florida	4–2	8–10	4–5	4–2	3–3	—	4–3	5–2	3–4	8–10	9–10	3–4	2–4	4–2	3–4	9–9	10–5
Houston	3–3	1–5	7–9	12–4	5–1	3-4	—	4–2	10–5	5–5	6–0	9–7	4–3	3–4	5–11	5–2	7–8
Los Angeles	5–13	3–3	2–4	4–3	8–11	2–5	2–4	—	5–1	3–3	3–3	5–2	11–7	9–10	2–5	2–4	5–13
Milwaukee	4–2	3–3	9–7	10–6	5–1	4–3	5–10	1–5	—	3–3	4–5	9–7	3–4	4–3	5–11	4–4	8–7
New York	6–1	6–13	4–2	3–3	4–3	10–8	5–5	3–3	3–3	—	11–7	3–3	4–2	3–3	2–5	11–8	5–10
Philadelphia	4-3	10–9	4–2	4–3	4–2	10–9	0–6	3–3	5–4	7–11	—	4–3	6–0	5–1	4–2	11–8	7–8
Pittsburgh	4–3	3–4	5–11	7–9	7–3	4–3	7–9	2–5	7–9	3–3	3–4	—	3–4	2–4	4–12	1–5	5–7
San Diego	9–10	5–1	3–4	2–4	11–7	4–2	3–4	7–11	4–3	2–4	0–6	4–3	—	12–6	4–3	5–1	7–11
San Francisco	11–7	2–4	2–5	5–3	11–7	2–4	4–3	10–9	3–4	3–3	1–5	4–2	6–12	—	2–4	3–3	6–12
St. Louis	5–2	3–3	6–10	11–5	4–4	4-3	11–5	5–2	11–5	5–2	2–4	12–4	3–4	4–2	—	4–2	10–5
Washington	4–2	9–10	5–1	1–5	4–2	9-9	2–5	4–2	4–4	8–11	8–11	5–1	1–5	3–3	2–4	—	12–6

=== Transactions ===
- July 1, 2005: Jason Standridge was signed as a free agent with the Cincinnati Reds.
- July 20, 2005: Kenny Kelly was selected off waivers by the Washington Nationals from the Cincinnati Reds.

=== Roster ===
2005 Cincinnati Reds
Roster
Pitchers: 31 Matt Belisle; 52 Chris Booker; 34 Brandon Claussen; 56 Todd Coffey; 32 Danny Graves; 43 Josh Hancock; 39 Aaron Harang; 54 Luke Hudson; 57 Randy Keisler; 50 Kent Mercker; 22 Eric Milton; 36 Ramón Ortiz; 45 Elizardo Ramírez; 37 Brian Shackelford; 46 Allan Simpson; 35 Jason Standridge; 52 Ricky Stone; 48 Joe Valentine; 38 Ryan Wagner; 25 David Weathers; 77 Ben Weber; 40 Paul Wilson	Catchers: 23 Jason LaRue; 29 Miguel Perez; 59 Dane Sardinha; 17 Javier Valentín; Infielders: 33 Rich Aurilia; 27 William Bergolla; 21 Sean Casey; 12 Edwin Encarnación; 6 Ryan Freel; 7 Aaron Holbert; 3 D'Angelo Jiménez; 2 Felipe López; 15 Luis López; 19 Andy Machado; 4 Ray Olmedo; 16 Joe Randa	Outfielders: 9 Jacob Cruz; 19 Chris Denorfia; 44 Adam Dunn; 30 Ken Griffey Jr.; 28 Austin Kearns; 29 Kenny Kelly; 26 Wily Mo Peña; 7 Jason Romano	Manager: 12 Dave Miley; 41 Jerry Narron; Coaches: 55 Mark Berry (third base); 49 Chris Chambliss (hitting); 35 Don Gullett (pitching); 47 Tom Hume (bullpen); 41 Jerry Narron (bench); 53 Randy Whisler (first base)

== Player stats ==
=== Batting ===
==== Starters by position ====
Note: Pos = Position; G = Games played; AB = At bats; H = Hits; Avg. = Batting average; HR = Home runs; RBI = Runs batted in

Pos	Player	G	AB	H	Avg.	HR	RBI
C	Jason LaRue	110	361	94	.260	14	60
1B	Sean Casey	137	529	165	.312	9	58
2B	Rich Aurilia	114	426	120	.282	14	68
SS	Felipe López	148	580	169	.291	23	85
3B	Joe Randa	92	332	96	.289	13	48
LF	Adam Dunn	160	543	134	.247	40	101
CF	Ken Griffey Jr.	128	491	148	.301	35	92
RF	Austin Kearns	112	387	93	.240	18	67

==== Other batters ====
Note: G = Games played; AB = At bats; H = Hits; Avg. = Batting average; HR = Home runs; RBI = Runs batted in

Player	G	AB	H	Avg.	HR	RBI
Ryan Freel	103	369	100	.271	4	21
Wily Mo Peña	99	311	79	.254	19	51
Javier Valentín	76	221	62	.281	14	50
Edwin Encarnación	69	211	49	.232	9	31
Jacob Cruz	110	127	30	.236	4	18
D'Angelo Jiménez	35	105	24	.229	0	5
Ray Olmedo	54	77	17	.221	1	4
Chris Denorfia	18	38	10	.263	1	2
William Bergolla	17	38	5	.132	0	1
Jason Romano	19	30	8	.267	1	3
Aaron Holbert	22	27	6	.222	0	2
Luis López	17	27	6	.222	0	2
Kenny Kelly	7	9	3	.333	0	2
Dane Sardinha	1	3	0	.000	0	0
Miguel Pérez	2	3	0	.000	0	0
Anderson Machado	2	2	0	.000	0	0

=== Pitching ===
==== Starting pitchers ====
Note: G = Games pitched; IP = Innings pitched; W = Wins; L = Losses; ERA = Earned run average; SO = Strikeouts

Player	G	IP	W	L	ERA	SO
Aaron Harang	32	211.2	11	13	3.83	163
Eric Milton	34	186.1	8	15	6.47	123
Ramón Ortiz	30	171.1	9	11	5.36	96
Brandon Claussen	29	166.2	10	11	4.21	121
Luke Hudson	19	84.2	6	9	6.38	53
Paul Wilson	9	46.1	1	5	7.77	30

==== Other pitchers ====
Note: G = Games pitched; IP = Innings pitched; W = Wins; L = Losses; ERA = Earned run average; SO = Strikeouts

Player	G	IP	W	L	ERA	SO
Randy Keisler	24	56.0	2	1	6.27	43
Elizardo Ramírez	6	22.1	0	3	8.46	9

==== Relief pitchers ====
Note: G = Games pitched; W = Wins; L = Losses; SV = Saves; ERA = Earned run average; SO = Strikeouts

Player	G	W	L	SV	ERA	SO
David Weathers	73	7	4	15	3.94	61
Kent Mercker	78	3	1	4	3.65	45
Matt Belisle	60	4	8	1	4.41	59
Todd Coffey	57	4	1	1	4.50	26
Ryan Wagner	42	3	2	0	6.11	39
Brian Shackelford	37	1	0	0	2.43	17
Jason Standridge	32	2	2	0	4.06	17
Ricky Stone	23	0	0	0	6.75	15
Danny Graves	20	1	1	10	7.36	8
Joe Valentine	16	0	1	0	8.16	9
Josh Hancock	11	1	0	0	1.93	5
Ben Weber	10	0	0	0	8.03	8
Allan Simpson	9	0	1	0	6.75	6
Chris Booker	3	0	0	0	31.50	2

== Farm system ==
Level	Team	League	Manager
AAA	Louisville Bats	International League	Rick Sweet
AA	Chattanooga Lookouts	Southern League	Jayhawk Owens
A	Sarasota Reds	Florida State League	Edgar Caceres
A	Dayton Dragons	Midwest League	Alonzo Powell
Rookie	GCL Reds	Gulf Coast League	Luis Aguayo
Rookie	Billings Mustangs	Pioneer League	Rick Burleson
