= 2005 San Diego Padres season =

2005 San Diego Padres
- National League West champions
- League: National League
- Division: West
- Ballpark: Petco Park
- City: San Diego, California
- Record: 82–80 (.506)
- Divisional place: 1st
- Owners: John Moores
- General managers: Kevin Towers
- Managers: Bruce Bochy
- Television: 4SD (Mark Grant, Matt Vasgersian, Tony Gwynn)
- Radio: XEPRS-AM (Jerry Coleman, Ted Leitner, Tim Flannery); XEMO (Juan Angel Avila, Eduardo Ortega)

The 2005 San Diego Padres season was the 37th season for the San Diego Padres. For the first time since 1998, the Padres qualified for the postseason after five straight losing seasons. The 2005 team is noted as having one of the weakest records among any team to qualify for the postseason, finishing 82–80, which was tied with the 1973 New York Mets for the fewest wins ever in a non-shortened year since Major League Baseball expanded to a 162-game season in 1961, and the fewest of any team since 1885 (the record was eclipsed by the 2026 Houston Astros). They also had a run differential of –42, the second lowest of any team ever to make the postseason and the lowest for a division champion; their best month of the season was in May by going 22–6 with a +43 differential while the rest of the season saw them outscored by 85 runs.

The National League West was weak in 2005, with all teams finishing below the .500 mark except for the San Diego Padres, who only finished two games above the .500 mark. The closest team, the Arizona Diamondbacks, were five games back. Three teams in the Eastern Division finished with better records than San Diego but failed to qualify for the playoffs, such as the Philadelphia Phillies, who won 88 games and won all six of their games against the Padres.

There had been some speculation that the Padres would be the first team in MLB history to win a division and finish below .500, but their victory over the Los Angeles Dodgers on September 30 gave them their 81st victory, guaranteeing a split record. They were swept in three games by the St. Louis Cardinals in the NLDS.

== Offseason ==
- December 22, 2004: Mark Sweeney was signed as a free agent with the San Diego Padres.

== Regular season ==
=== Opening Day starters ===
Played at Coors Field on April 4, 2005. The Colorado Rockies defeated the Padres 12-10.

Player	Pos
Khalil Greene	SS
Mark Loretta	2B
Brian Giles	RF
Phil Nevin	1B
Ryan Klesko	LF
Ramón Hernández	C
Xavier Nady	CF
Sean Burroughs	3B
Woody Williams	SP

=== Season standings ===
==== National League West ====
NL West
Team	W	L	Pct.	GB	Home	Road
San Diego Padres	82	80	.506	—	46‍–‍35	36‍–‍45
Arizona Diamondbacks	77	85	.475	5	36‍–‍45	41‍–‍40
San Francisco Giants	75	87	.463	7	37‍–‍44	38‍–‍43
Los Angeles Dodgers	71	91	.438	11	40‍–‍41	31‍–‍50
Colorado Rockies	67	95	.414	15	40‍–‍41	27‍–‍54

==== Record vs. opponents ====
2005 National League record Source: MLB Standings Grid – 2005
Team	AZ	ATL	CHC	CIN	COL	FLA	HOU	LAD	MIL	NYM	PHI	PIT	SD	SF	STL	WAS	AL
Arizona	—	3–3	5–2	2–4	11–7	2–4	3–3	13–5	2–4	1–6	3–4	3–4	10–9	7–11	2–5	2–4	8–10
Atlanta	3–3	—	6–1	7–3	2–4	10–8	5–1	3–3	3–3	13–6	9–10	4–3	1–5	4–2	3–3	10–9	7–8
Chicago	2–5	1–6	—	6–9	4–3	5–4	9–7	4–2	7–9	2–4	2–4	11–5	4–3	5–2	10–6	1–5	6–9
Cincinnati	4–2	3–7	9–6	—	3–3	2–4	4–12	3–4	6–10	3–3	3–4	9–7	4–2	3–5	5–11	5–1	7-8
Colorado	7–11	4–2	3–4	3–3	—	3–3	1–5	11–8	1–5	3–4	2–4	3–7	7–11	7–11	4–4	2–4	6–9
Florida	4–2	8–10	4–5	4–2	3–3	—	4–3	5–2	3–4	8–10	9–10	3–4	2–4	4–2	3–4	9–9	10–5
Houston	3–3	1–5	7–9	12–4	5–1	3-4	—	4–2	10–5	5–5	6–0	9–7	4–3	3–4	5–11	5–2	7–8
Los Angeles	5–13	3–3	2–4	4–3	8–11	2–5	2–4	—	5–1	3–3	3–3	5–2	11–7	9–10	2–5	2–4	5–13
Milwaukee	4–2	3–3	9–7	10–6	5–1	4–3	5–10	1–5	—	3–3	4–5	9–7	3–4	4–3	5–11	4–4	8–7
New York	6–1	6–13	4–2	3–3	4–3	10–8	5–5	3–3	3–3	—	11–7	3–3	4–2	3–3	2–5	11–8	5–10
Philadelphia	4-3	10–9	4–2	4–3	4–2	10–9	0–6	3–3	5–4	7–11	—	4–3	6–0	5–1	4–2	11–8	7–8
Pittsburgh	4–3	3–4	5–11	7–9	7–3	4–3	7–9	2–5	7–9	3–3	3–4	—	3–4	2–4	4–12	1–5	5–7
San Diego	9–10	5–1	3–4	2–4	11–7	4–2	3–4	7–11	4–3	2–4	0–6	4–3	—	12–6	4–3	5–1	7–11
San Francisco	11–7	2–4	2–5	5–3	11–7	2–4	4–3	10–9	3–4	3–3	1–5	4–2	6–12	—	2–4	3–3	6–12
St. Louis	5–2	3–3	6–10	11–5	4–4	4-3	11–5	5–2	11–5	5–2	2–4	12–4	3–4	4–2	—	4–2	10–5
Washington	4–2	9–10	5–1	1–5	4–2	9-9	2–5	4–2	4–4	8–11	8–11	5–1	1–5	3–3	2–4	—	12–6

=== Game log ===
2005 Game Log
April (11–13)

#	Date	Opponent	Score	Win	Loss	Save	Attendance	Record
1	April 4	@ Rockies	10–12					0–1
2	April 6	@ Rockies	14–6					1–1
3	April 7	Pirates	1–0					2–1
4	April 8	Pirates	2–3					2–2
5	April 9	Pirates	11–3					3–2
6	April 10	Pirates	3–6					3–3
7	April 11	@ Cubs	1–0					4–3
8	April 13 (1)	@ Cubs	8–3					5–3
9	April 13 (2)	@ Cubs	3–8					5–4
10	April 15	@ Dodgers	0–4					5–5
11	April 16	@ Dodgers	3–8					5–6
12	April 17	@ Dodgers	0–6					5–7
13	April 18	Giants	7–2					6–7
14	April 19	Giants	5–2					7–7
15	April 20	Dodgers	1–3					7–8
16	April 21	Dodgers	6–1					8–8
17	April 22	@ D-backs	3–5					8–9
18	April 23	@ D-backs	1–2					8–10
19	April 24	@ D-backs	6–8					8–11
20	April 25	@ Giants	5–3					9–11
21	April 26	@ Giants	5–6					9–12
22	April 27	@ Giants	3–10					9–13
23	April 29	D-backs	5–4					10–13
24	April 30	D-backs	2–0					11–13

May (22–6)

#	Date	Opponent	Score	Win	Loss	Save	Attendance	Record
25	May 1	D-backs	2–5					11–14
26	May 2	Rockies	5–4					12–14
27	May 3	Rockies	2–1					13–14
28	May 4	Rockies	8–7					14–14
29	May 5	@ Cardinals	8–3					15–14
30	May 6	@ Cardinals	6–5					16–14
31	May 7	@ Cardinals	5–4					17–14
32	May 8	@ Cardinals	5–15					17–15
33	May 9	@ Reds	6–5					18–15
34	May 10	@ Reds	1–5					18–16
35	May 11	@ Reds	7–2					19–16
36	May 13	Marlins	3–2					20–16
37	May 14	Marlins	2–1					21–16
38	May 15	Marlins	12–4					22–16
39	May 16	Braves	5–3					23–16
40	May 17	Braves	3–2					24–16
41	May 18	Braves	8–4					25–16
42	May 20	@ Mariners	6–1					26–16
43	May 21	@ Mariners	3–5					26–17
44	May 22	@ Mariners	0–5					26–18
45	May 24	@ D-backs	9–5					27–18
46	May 25	@ D-backs	11–12					27–19
47	May 26	@ D-backs	10–0					28–19
48	May 27	@ Giants	9–3					29–19
49	May 28	@ Giants	5–3					30–19
50	May 29	@ Giants	9–6					31–19
51	May 30	Brewers	2–1					32–19
52	May 31	Brewers	8–4					33–19

June (10–17)

#	Date	Opponent	Score	Win	Loss	Save	Attendance	Record
53	June 1	Brewers	2–5					33–20
54	June 2	Cubs	0–5					33–21
55	June 3	Cubs	6–2					34–21
56	June 4	Cubs	5–11					34–22
57	June 5	Cubs	0–4					34–23
58	June 7	Indians	0–2					34–24
59	June 8	Indians	1–6					34–25
60	June 9	Indians	3–2					35–25
61	June 10	White Sox	2–4					35–26
62	June 11	White Sox	2–1					36–26
63	June 12	White Sox	5–8					36–27
64	June 14	@ Tigers	4–8					36–28
65	June 15	@ Tigers	2–8					36–29
66	June 16	@ Tigers	1–3					36–30
67	June 17	@ Twins	4–5					36–31
68	June 18	@ Twins	7–2					37–31
69	June 19	@ Twins	5–1					38–31
70	June 20	Dodgers	1–0					39–31
71	June 21	Dodgers	2–1					40–31
72	June 22	Dodgers	4–6					40–32
73	June 23	Dodgers	3–4					40–33
74	June 24	Mariners	5–14					40–34
75	June 25	Mariners	8–5					41–34
76	June 26	Mariners	5–4					42–34
77	June 27	@ Dodgers	4–5					42–35
78	June 28	@ Dodgers	8–3					43–35
79	June 29	@ Dodgers	2–4					43–36

July (8–18)

#	Date	Opponent	Score	Win	Loss	Save	Attendance	Record
80	July 1	Giants	2–3					43–37
81	July 2	Giants	5–3					44–37
82	July 3	Giants	9–6					45–37
83	July 4	@ Astros	1–4					45–38
84	July 5	@ Astros	2–6					45–39
85	July 6	@ Astros	4–5					45–40
86	July 7	@ Astros	7–5					46–40
87	July 8	@ Rockies	12–2					47–40
88	July 9	@ Rockies	0–1					47–41
89	July 10	@ Rockies	8–5					48–41
90	July 14	D-backs	0–6					48–42
91	July 15	D-backs	10–7					49–42
92	July 16	D-backs	4–1					50–42
93	July 17	D-backs	1–6					50–43
94	July 19	@ Mets	1–3					50–44
95	July 20	@ Mets	3–7					50–45
96	July 21	@ Mets	0–12					50–46
97	July 22	@ Phillies	6–8					50–47
98	July 23	@ Phillies	0–2					50–48
99	July 24	@ Phillies	1–5					50–49
100	July 26	Cardinals	2–4					50–50
101	July 27	Cardinals	2–1					51–50
102	July 28	Cardinals	3–11					51–51
103	July 29	Reds	3–8					51–52
104	July 30	Reds	1–9					51–53
105	July 31	Reds	1–7					51–54

August (15–12)

#	Date	Opponent	Score	Win	Loss	Save	Attendance	Record
106	August 2	@ Pirates	11–3					52–54
107	August 3	@ Pirates	8–9					52–55
108	August 4	@ Pirates	12–7					53–55
109	August 5	@ Nationals	6–5					54–55
110	August 6	@ Nationals	3–2					55–55
111	August 7	@ Nationals	3–0					56–55
112	August 9	Mets	8–3					57–55
113	August 10	Mets	1–9					57–56
114	August 11	Mets	2–1					58–56
115	August 12	Phillies	2–3					58–57
116	August 13	Phillies	2–5					58–58
117	August 14	Phillies	3–8					58–59
118	August 16	@ Marlins	4–2					59–59
119	August 17	@ Marlins	0–6					59–60
120	August 18	@ Marlins	0–2					59–61
121	August 19	@ Braves	12–7					60–61
122	August 20	@ Braves	7–2					61–61
123	August 21	@ Braves	2–6					61–62
124	August 22	Astros	2–6					61–63
125	August 23	Astros	2–0					62–63
126	August 24	Astros	7–4					63–63
127	August 26	Rockies	3–4					63–64
128	August 27	Rockies	2–4					63–65
129	August 28	Rockies	4–3					64–65
130	August 29	D-backs	5–7					64–66
131	August 30	D-backs	5–3					65–66
132	August 31	D-backs	9–5					66–66

September (15–13)

#	Date	Opponent	Score	Win	Loss	Save	Attendance	Record
133	September 1	@ Brewers	6–5					67–66
134	September 2	@ Brewers	2–12					67–67
135	September 3	@ Brewers	6–1					68–67
136	September 4	@ Brewers	2–3					68–68
137	September 6	Rockies	5–6					68–69
138	September 7	Rockies	4–2					69–69
139	September 8	Rockies	3–2					70–69
140	September 9	@ Dodgers	3–1					71–69
141	September 10	@ Dodgers	1–3					71–70
142	September 11	@ Dodgers	3–7					71–71
143	September 12	@ Giants	3–4					71–72
144	September 13	@ Giants	4–5					71–73
145	September 14	@ Giants	5–4					72–73
146	September 16	Nationals	1–5					72–74
147	September 17	Nationals	8–5					73–74
148	September 18	Nationals	2–1					74–74
149	September 19	@ Rockies	8–7					75–74
150	September 20	@ Rockies	1–20					75–75
151	September 21	@ Rockies	5–2					76–75
152	September 22	@ Rockies	2–4					76–76
153	September 23	@ D-backs	5–3					77–76
154	September 24	@ D-backs	5–8					77–77
155	September 25	@ D-backs	3–4					77–78
156	September 26	Giants	2–3					77–79
157	September 27	Giants	9–6					78–79
158	September 28	Giants	9–1					79–79
159	September 29	Giants	1–0					80–79
160	September 30	Dodgers	3–1					81–79

October (1–1)

#	Date	Opponent	Score	Win	Loss	Save	Attendance	Record
161	October 1	Dodgers	1–2					81–80
162	October 2	Dodgers	3–1					82–80

=== Postseason Game Log ===
2005 Postseason Game Log
NLDS (0–3)

#	Date	Opponent	Score	Win	Loss	Save	Attendance	Record
1	October 4	@ Cardinals	5–8					0–1
2	October 6	@ Cardinals	2–6					0–2
3	October 8	Cardinals	4–7					0–3

=== Notable transactions ===
- June 7, 2005: Josh Geer was drafted by the San Diego Padres in the 3rd round of the 2005 amateur draft. Player signed July 1, 2005.

=== Roster ===
2005 San Diego Padres
Roster
Pitchers: 34 Pedro Astacio; 49 Craig Breslow; 56 Scott Cassidy; 53 Adam Eaton; 41 Brian Falkenborg; 29 Chris Hammond; 52 Clay Hensley; 51 Trevor Hoffman; 50 Brian Lawrence; 38 Scott Linebrink; 34 Darrell May; 16 Akinori Otsuka; 58 Chris Oxspring; 61 Chan Ho Park; 44 Jake Peavy; 46 Paul Quantrill; 39 Tim Redding; 49 Dennys Reyes; 37 Rudy Seánez; 47 Tim Stauffer; 57 Randy Williams; 17 Woody Williams	Catchers: 55 Ramón Hernández; 20 Miguel Ojeda; 14 Miguel Olivo; 9 David Ross; Infielders: 20 Manny Alexander; 27 Geoff Blum; 33 Sean Burroughs; 13 Robert Fick; 9 Jesse Garcia; 3 Khalil Greene; 8 Mark Loretta; 22 Xavier Nady; 23 Phil Nevin; 28 Joe Randa; 11 Mark Sweeney; 39 Wilson Valdéz	Outfielders: 24 Brian Giles; 14 Adam Hyzdu; 2 Damian Jackson; 4 Ben Johnson; 30 Ryan Klesko; 18 Paul McAnulty; 10 Dave Roberts; 7 Eric Young	Manager: 15 Bruce Bochy; Coaches: 48 Darrel Akerfelds (bullpen); 36 Darren Balsley (pitching); 25 Davey Lopes (first base); 12 Dave Magadan (hitting); 40 Tony Muser (bench); 5 Rob Picciolo (third base)

== Player stats ==
=== Batting ===
==== Starters by position ====
Note: Pos = Position; G = Games played; AB = At bats; H = Hits; Avg. = Batting average; HR = Home runs; RBI = Runs batted in

Pos	Player	G	AB	H	Avg.	HR	RBI
C	Ramón Hernández	99	369	107	.290	12	58
1B	Phil Nevin	73	281	72	.256	9	47
2B	Mark Loretta	105	404	113	.280	3	38
SS	Khalil Greene	121	436	109	.250	15	70
3B	Sean Burroughs	93	284	71	.250	1	17
LF	Ryan Klesko	137	443	110	.248	18	58
CF	Dave Roberts	115	411	113	.275	8	38
RF	Brian Giles	158	545	164	.301	15	83

==== Other batters ====
Note: G = Games played; AB = At bats; H = Hits; Avg. = Batting average; HR = Home runs; RBI = Runs batted in

Player	G	AB	H	Avg.	HR	RBI
Xavier Nady	124	326	85	.261	13	43
Damian Jackson	118	275	70	.255	5	23
Robert Fick	93	230	61	.265	3	30
Geoff Blum	78	224	54	.241	5	22
Joe Randa	58	223	57	.256	4	20
Mark Sweeney	135	221	65	.294	8	40
Eric Young Sr.	56	142	39	.275	2	12
Miguel Olivo	37	115	35	.304	4	16
Ben Johnson	31	75	16	.213	3	13
Miguel Ojeda	43	73	10	.137	0	6
Jesse Garcia	16	36	6	.167	2	4
Paul McAnulty	22	24	5	.208	0	0
Adam Hyzdu	17	20	3	.150	0	4
Manny Alexander	10	18	2	.111	0	0
David Ross	11	17	6	.353	0	0
Wilson Valdez	9	13	3	.231	0	1

=== Pitching ===
==== Starting pitchers ====
Note: G = Games pitched; IP = Innings pitched; W = Wins; L = Losses; ERA = Earned run average; SO = Strikeouts

Player	G	IP	W	L	ERA	SO
Jake Peavy	30	203.0	13	7	2.88	216
Brian Lawrence	33	195.2	7	15	4.83	109
Woody Williams	28	159.2	9	12	4.85	106
Adam Eaton	24	128.2	11	5	4.27	100
Tim Stauffer	15	81.0	3	6	5.33	49
Pedro Astacio	12	59.2	4	2	3.17	33
Chan Ho Park	10	45.2	4	3	5.91	33

==== Other pitchers ====
Note: G = Games pitched; IP = Innings pitched; W = Wins; L = Losses; ERA = Earned run average; SO = Strikeouts

Player	G	IP	W	L	ERA	SO
Darrell May	22	59.1	1	3	5.61	32
Tim Redding	9	29.2	0	5	9.10	17

==== Relief pitchers ====
Note: G = Games pitched; W = Wins; L = Losses; SV = Saves; ERA = Earned run average; SO = Strikeouts

Player	G	W	L	SV	ERA	SO
Trevor Hoffman	60	1	6	43	2.97	54
Scott Linebrink	73	8	1	1	1.83	70
Akinori Otsuka	66	2	8	1	3.59	60
Rudy Seánez	57	7	1	0	2.69	84
Chris Hammond	55	5	1	0	3.84	34
Dennys Reyes	36	3	2	0	5.15	35
Clay Hensley	24	1	1	0	1.70	28
Paul Quantrill	22	1	1	0	3.41	24
Craig Breslow	14	0	0	0	2.20	14
Scott Cassidy	10	1	1	0	6.57	12
Brian Falkenborg	10	0	0	0	8.18	10
Chris Oxspring	5	0	0	0	3.75	11
Randy Williams	2	1	0	0	12.46	2
Sean Burroughs	1	0	0	0	27.00	0

== Award winners ==
- Jake Peavy, National League Strikeout Champion (216)
- Trevor Hoffman, NL Pitcher of the Month (May 2005)

2005 Major League Baseball All-Star Game

- Jake Peavy

== 2005 NLDS ==
=== Game 1, October 4 ===
Busch Stadium II in St. Louis, Missouri

Team	1	2	3	4	5	6	7	8	9	R	H	E
San Diego	0	0	0	0	0	0	1	1	3	5	13	1
St. Louis	1	0	3	0	4	0	0	0	X	8	10	1
WP: Chris Carpenter (1-0) LP: Jake Peavy (0-1); Home runs: SD: Eric Young (1); STL: Jim Edmonds (1), Reggie Sanders (1)

=== Game 2, October 6 ===
Busch Stadium II in St. Louis, Missouri

Team	1	2	3	4	5	6	7	8	9	R	H	E
San Diego	0	0	0	0	0	0	1	1	0	2	10	1
St. Louis	0	0	2	2	0	0	2	0	X	6	6	0
WP: Mark Mulder (1-0) LP: Pedro Astacio (0-1)

=== Game 3, October 8 ===
Petco Park in San Diego, California

Team	1	2	3	4	5	6	7	8	9	R	H	E
St. Louis	1	4	0	0	2	0	0	0	0	7	13	1
San Diego	0	0	0	0	2	0	1	1	0	4	9	0
WP: Matt Morris (1-0) LP: Woody Williams (0-1) Sv: Jason Isringhausen (1); Home runs: STL: David Eckstein (1); SD: Dave Roberts (1), Ramón Hernández (1)

== Farm system ==
Level	Team	League	Manager
AAA	Portland Beavers	Pacific Coast League	Craig Colbert
AA	Mobile BayBears	Southern League	Gary Jones
A	Lake Elsinore Storm	California League	Rick Renteria
A	Fort Wayne Wizards	Midwest League	Anthony Contreras
A-Short Season	Eugene Emeralds	Northwest League	Roy Howell
Rookie	AZL Padres	Arizona League	Carlos Lezcano
