= J. J. Furmaniak =

American baseball player (born 1979)

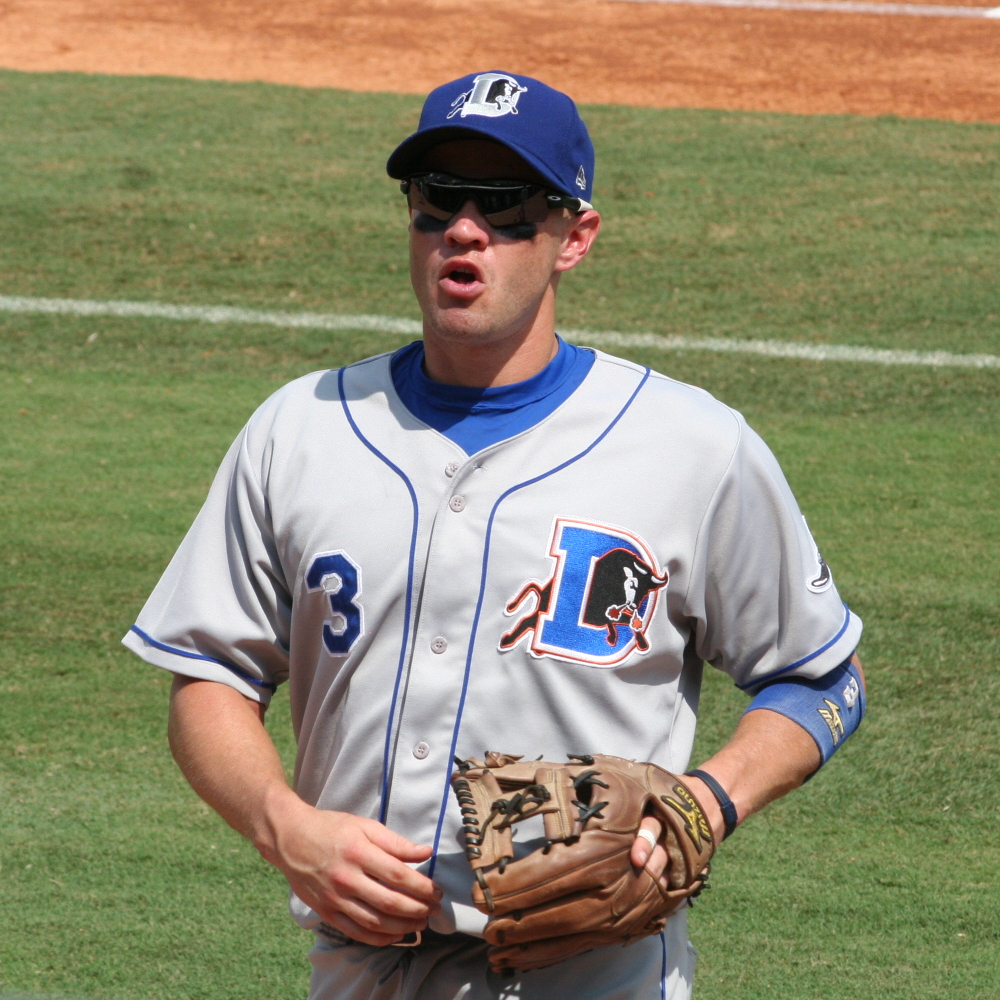
- Furmaniak with the Durham Bulls in 2010
- Infielder
- Born: July 31, 1979 (age 46); Bolingbrook, Illinois, U.S.
- Batted: Right Threw: Right

Professional debut
- MLB: September 13, 2005, for the Pittsburgh Pirates
- NPB: March 28, 2008, for the Yokohama BayStars

Last appearance
- MLB: September 29, 2007, for the Oakland Athletics
- NPB: August 7, 2008, for the Yokohama BayStars

MLB statistics
- Batting average: .186
- Home runs: 0
- Runs batted in: 2

NPB statistics
- Batting average: .157
- Home runs: 2
- Runs batted in: 5
- Stats at Baseball Reference

Teams
- Pittsburgh Pirates (2005); Oakland Athletics (2007); Yokohama BayStars (2008)

Jason Joseph "J. J." Furmaniak (born July 31, 1979) is an American former professional baseball infielder, who played in the major leagues for the Pittsburgh Pirates and the Oakland Athletics.

== Early life and career ==
Furmaniak was born in Bolingbrook, Illinois After graduating from Bolingbrook High School, Furmaniak attended college at Lewis University in Romeoville, Illinois.

He was drafted by the San Diego Padres in the 22nd round of the 2000 Major League Baseball draft. He was a Minor League All-Star in 2000, 2003 and 2005. Furmaniak made his major league debut with the Pittsburgh Pirates on September 13, 2005, and played with the Pirates for the 2005 season. He played for the Oakland Athletics during the 2007 Season. Furmaniak became a free agent on October 7, 2007, after refusing an outright assignment to the minors.

He signed with the Yokohama BayStars of Nippon Professional Baseball during the offseason, and played with the team for the 2008 season. On December 17, 2008, Furmaniak signed a minor league contract with the Philadelphia Phillies. He appeared in 118 games with the Phillies' AAA affiliate in 2009, hitting .230 with five home runs while driving in 48 runs. He later signed with the Tampa Bay Rays on February 4, 2010, as a free agent. Furmaniak played in the minors in 2010 and 2011.

== Personal life ==
He is married to Jen Furmaniak and they have one son and one daughter together.
