= Ryan Jorgensen =

American baseball player (born 1979)

- Catcher
- Born: May 4, 1979 (age 47); Jacksonville, Florida, U.S.
- Batted: Right Threw: Right

MLB debut
- August 8, 2005, for the Florida Marlins

Last MLB appearance
- September 19, 2008, for the Minnesota Twins

MLB statistics
- Batting average: .150
- Home runs: 2
- Runs batted in: 6
- Stats at Baseball Reference

Teams
- Florida Marlins (2005); Cincinnati Reds (2007); Minnesota Twins (2008)

Ryan Wayne Jorgensen (born May 4, 1979) is an American former Major League Baseball catcher. He attended Kingwood High School and Louisiana State University.

Jorgensen was originally drafted by the Tampa Bay Devil Rays in the Major League Baseball draft two times, but did not sign either time. In 1997, he was drafted in the 29th round (894th overall) and in 1998, he was drafted in the 24th round (732nd overall). In 2000, he was drafted by the Chicago Cubs in the seventh round (193rd overall), and this time he did sign a contract.

On March 27, 2002, Jorgensen was traded to the Florida Marlins along with pitchers Julián Tavárez, José Cueto, and Dontrelle Willis for pitchers Antonio Alfonseca and Matt Clement. He would spend the next four years in the Marlins organization. Jorgensen made his major league debut on August 8, 2005 against the Colorado Rockies, and played in both games of a doubleheader. He made his first major league start in the second game and went 0-for-3 with two strikeouts. He would appear in four games and had just four hitless at-bats for the Marlins in 2005.

Jorgensen was traded to the Cincinnati Reds for second baseman Carlos Piste on March 28, 2006. He played for the Louisville Bats, the Reds' Triple-A affiliate, for the entire 2006 season, batting .213 with eight home runs and 30 RBI in 74 games. In 2007, Jorgensen began the season for the Bats again. When David Ross went down with an injury, Jorgensen had his contract purchased by the big league club on August 14, 2007. On August 15, 2007, in a start for the Reds, Jorgensen recorded his first big league hit, a home run, in his first at-bat for the Reds off Chicago Cubs pitcher Ted Lilly. Despite only appearing in four games with the Reds, he hit two home runs and drove in six runs while batting .200 (3-for-15).

On September 7, 2007, Jorgensen was suspended for 50 games for a violation of MLB's Joint Drug Prevention and Treatment Program. On October 19, 2007, Jorgensen was outrighted to the minor leagues. He refused the assignment and became a free agent. On December 13, 2007, Jorgensen was one of many MLB players named in the Mitchell Report.

Jorgensen signed a minor league contract with the Minnesota Twins for the 2008 season and was assigned to Triple-A Rochester, where he began play at the conclusion of his suspension. He was called up to the majors after the September 1 roster expansions. Jorgensen appeared in two games with the Twins as a defensive replacement, going 0-for-1.

On November 19, 2008, Jorgensen signed with the Cincinnati Reds. However, he announced his retirement before the start of spring training.
