= 2005 Arizona Diamondbacks season =

2005 Arizona Diamondbacks
- League: National League
- Division: West
- Ballpark: Bank One Ballpark
- City: Phoenix, Arizona
- Record: 77–85 (.475)
- Divisional place: 2nd
- Owners: Ken Kendrick; Jeff Moorad
- General managers: Joe Garagiola Jr., Bob Gebhard
- Managers: Bob Melvin
- Television: FSN Arizona; KTVK (3TV) (Thom Brennaman, Mark Grace, Greg Schulte, Joe Garagiola, Matt Williams)
- Radio: KTAR (620 AM) (Greg Schulte, Jeff Munn, Thom Brennaman, Ken Phelps)
- Stats: ESPN.com; Baseball Reference

The 2005 Arizona Diamondbacks season was the franchise's 8th season in Major League Baseball and their 8th season at Bank One Ballpark in Phoenix, Arizona, as members of the National League West.

They looked to improve on their 51–111 record from 2004. They looked to contend in what was once again a weak National League West. They finished the season with a record of 77–85, good for second place in the division.

== Offseason ==
- December 11, 2004: Russ Ortiz was signed as a free agent with the Arizona Diamondbacks.
- December 21, 2004: Craig Counsell was signed as a free agent with the Arizona Diamondbacks.
- January 11, 2005: Shawn Green was traded by the Los Angeles Dodgers to the Arizona Diamondbacks for Dioner Navarro, Beltrán Pérez, Danny Muegge (minors), and William Juarez (minors).
- January 11, 2005: Randy Johnson was traded by the Arizona Diamondbacks to the New York Yankees for Javier Vázquez, Brad Halsey, Dioner Navarro, and cash.

== Regular season ==
=== Notable Transactions ===
- July 31, 2005: Buddy Groom was sent to the Arizona Diamondbacks by the New York Yankees as part of a conditional deal.

=== Season standings ===
==== National League West ====
NL West
Team	W	L	Pct.	GB	Home	Road
San Diego Padres	82	80	.506	—	46‍–‍35	36‍–‍45
Arizona Diamondbacks	77	85	.475	5	36‍–‍45	41‍–‍40
San Francisco Giants	75	87	.463	7	37‍–‍44	38‍–‍43
Los Angeles Dodgers	71	91	.438	11	40‍–‍41	31‍–‍50
Colorado Rockies	67	95	.414	15	40‍–‍41	27‍–‍54

==== Record vs. opponents ====
2005 National League record Source: MLB Standings Grid – 2005
Team	AZ	ATL	CHC	CIN	COL	FLA	HOU	LAD	MIL	NYM	PHI	PIT	SD	SF	STL	WAS	AL
Arizona	—	3–3	5–2	2–4	11–7	2–4	3–3	13–5	2–4	1–6	3–4	3–4	10–9	7–11	2–5	2–4	8–10
Atlanta	3–3	—	6–1	7–3	2–4	10–8	5–1	3–3	3–3	13–6	9–10	4–3	1–5	4–2	3–3	10–9	7–8
Chicago	2–5	1–6	—	6–9	4–3	5–4	9–7	4–2	7–9	2–4	2–4	11–5	4–3	5–2	10–6	1–5	6–9
Cincinnati	4–2	3–7	9–6	—	3–3	2–4	4–12	3–4	6–10	3–3	3–4	9–7	4–2	3–5	5–11	5–1	7-8
Colorado	7–11	4–2	3–4	3–3	—	3–3	1–5	11–8	1–5	3–4	2–4	3–7	7–11	7–11	4–4	2–4	6–9
Florida	4–2	8–10	4–5	4–2	3–3	—	4–3	5–2	3–4	8–10	9–10	3–4	2–4	4–2	3–4	9–9	10–5
Houston	3–3	1–5	7–9	12–4	5–1	3-4	—	4–2	10–5	5–5	6–0	9–7	4–3	3–4	5–11	5–2	7–8
Los Angeles	5–13	3–3	2–4	4–3	8–11	2–5	2–4	—	5–1	3–3	3–3	5–2	11–7	9–10	2–5	2–4	5–13
Milwaukee	4–2	3–3	9–7	10–6	5–1	4–3	5–10	1–5	—	3–3	4–5	9–7	3–4	4–3	5–11	4–4	8–7
New York	6–1	6–13	4–2	3–3	4–3	10–8	5–5	3–3	3–3	—	11–7	3–3	4–2	3–3	2–5	11–8	5–10
Philadelphia	4-3	10–9	4–2	4–3	4–2	10–9	0–6	3–3	5–4	7–11	—	4–3	6–0	5–1	4–2	11–8	7–8
Pittsburgh	4–3	3–4	5–11	7–9	7–3	4–3	7–9	2–5	7–9	3–3	3–4	—	3–4	2–4	4–12	1–5	5–7
San Diego	9–10	5–1	3–4	2–4	11–7	4–2	3–4	7–11	4–3	2–4	0–6	4–3	—	12–6	4–3	5–1	7–11
San Francisco	11–7	2–4	2–5	5–3	11–7	2–4	4–3	10–9	3–4	3–3	1–5	4–2	6–12	—	2–4	3–3	6–12
St. Louis	5–2	3–3	6–10	11–5	4–4	4-3	11–5	5–2	11–5	5–2	2–4	12–4	3–4	4–2	—	4–2	10–5
Washington	4–2	9–10	5–1	1–5	4–2	9-9	2–5	4–2	4–4	8–11	8–11	5–1	1–5	3–3	2–4	—	12–6

=== Roster ===
2005 Arizona Diamondbacks
Roster
Pitchers: 57 Armando Almanza; 41 Greg Aquino; 30 Brian Bruney; 50 Jason Bulger; 21 Randy Choate; 32 Lance Cormier; 55 Shawn Estes; 49 Édgar González; 44 Mike Gosling; 28 Buddy Groom; 37 Brad Halsey; 31 Matt Herges; 76 Mike Koplove; 36 Kerry Ligtenberg; 39 Javier López; 38 Brandon Lyon; 52 Brandon Medders; 57 Dustin Nippert; 48 Russ Ortiz; 47 José Valverde; 29 Claudio Vargas; 23 Javier Vázquez; 56 Óscar Villarreal; 17 Brandon Webb; 45 Tim Worrell	Catchers: 5 Koyie Hill; 19 Chris Snyder; 35 Kelly Stinnett; Infielders: 10 Alex Cintrón; 34 Tony Clark; 10 Royce Clayton; 4 Craig Counsell; 25 Troy Glaus; 1 Andy Green; 16 Conor Jackson; 11 Matt Kata; 18 Chad Tracy	Outfielders: 22 José Cruz Jr.; 20 Luis Gonzalez; 15 Shawn Green; 9 Scott Hairston; 6 Quinton McCracken; 27 Luis Terrero	Manager: 3 Bob Melvin; Coaches: 8 Mike Aldrete (hitting); 33 Jay Bell (bench); 2 Brett Butler (first base); 13 Mark Davis (pitching); 53 Glenn Sherlock (bullpen); 14 Carlos Tosca (third base)

== Player stats ==
=== Batting ===
==== Starters by position ====
Note: Pos = Position; G = Games played; AB = At bats; H = Hits; Avg. = Batting average; HR = Home runs; RBI = Runs batted in

Pos	Player	G	AB	H	Avg.	HR	RBI
C	Chris Snyder	115	326	66	.202	6	28
1B	Chad Tracy	145	503	155	.308	27	72
2B	Craig Counsell	150	578	148	.256	9	42
SS	Royce Clayton	143	522	141	.270	2	44
3B	Troy Glaus	149	538	139	.258	37	97
LF	Luis Gonzalez	155	579	157	.271	24	79
CF	Luis Terrero	88	161	37	.230	4	20
RF	Shawn Green	158	581	166	.286	22	73

==== Other batters ====
Note: G = Games played; AB = At bats; H = Hits; Avg. = Batting average; HR = Home runs; RBI = Runs batted in

Player	G	AB	H	Avg.	HR	RBI
Tony Clark	130	349	106	.304	30	87
Alex Cintrón	122	330	90	.237	8	48
Quinton McCracken	134	215	51	.237	1	13
José Cruz Jr.	64	202	43	.213	12	28
Kelly Stinnett	59	129	32	.248	6	12
Conor Jackson	40	85	17	.200	2	8
Koyie Hill	34	78	17	.218	0	6
Andy Green	17	31	7	.226	0	2
Matt Kata	30	31	6	.194	0	0
Scott Hairston	15	20	2	.100	0	0

=== Pitching ===
==== Starting pitchers ====
Note: G = Games pitched; IP = Innings pitched; W = Wins; L = Losses; ERA = Earned run average; SO = Strikeouts

Player	G	IP	W	L	ERA	SO
Brandon Webb	33	229.0	14	12	3.54	172
Javier Vázquez	33	215.2	11	15	4.42	192
Brad Halsey	28	160.0	8	12	4.61	82
Shawn Estes	21	123.2	7	8	4.80	63
Claudio Vargas	21	119.2	9	6	4.81	90
Russ Ortiz	22	115.0	5	11	6.89	46
Dustin Nippert	3	14.2	1	0	5.52	11

==== Other pitchers ====
Note: G = Games pitched; IP = Innings pitched; W = Wins; L = Losses; ERA = Earned run average; SO = Strikeouts

Player	G	IP	W	L	ERA	SO
Mike Gosling	13	32.1	0	3	4.45	14

===== Relief pitchers =====
Note: G = Games pitched; W = Wins; L = Losses; SV = Saves; ERA = Earned run average; SO = Strikeouts

Player	G	W	L	SV	ERA	SO
José Valverde	61	3	4	15	2.44	75
Lance Cormier	67	7	3	0	5.11	63
Brian Bruney	47	1	3	12	7.43	51
Mike Koplove	44	2	1	0	5.07	28
Greg Aquino	35	0	1	1	7.76	34
Tim Worrell	32	1	1	0	2.27	22
Brandon Lyon	32	0	2	14	6.44	17
Javier López	29	1	1	2	9.42	11
Brandon Medders	27	4	1	0	1.78	31
Buddy Groom	23	0	1	1	4.70	7
Óscar Villarreal	11	2	0	0	5.27	5
Jason Bulger	9	1	0	0	5.40	9
Randy Choate	8	0	0	0	9.00	4
Kerry Ligtenberg	7	0	0	0	13.97	5
Matt Herges	7	0	0	0	13.50	3
Armando Almanza	6	0	0	0	2.25	2
Édgar González	1	0	0	0	108.00	1

== Minor League ==
Level	Team	League	Manager
AAA	Tucson Sidewinders	Pacific Coast League	Chip Hale
AA	Tennessee Smokies	Southern League	Tony Perezchica
A	Lancaster JetHawks	California League	Bill Plummer
A	South Bend Silver Hawks	Midwest League	Mark Haley
A-Short Season	Yakima Bears	Northwest League	Jay Gainer
Rookie	Missoula Osprey	Pioneer League	Jim Presley

LEAGUE CHAMPIONS: South Bend
