= David Williams (2000s pitcher) =

American baseball player (born 1979)

- Pitcher
- Born: March 12, 1979 (age 47); Anchorage, Alaska, U.S.
- Batted: Left Threw: Left

MLB debut
- June 6, 2001, for the Pittsburgh Pirates

Last MLB appearance
- September 24, 2007, for the New York Mets

MLB statistics
- Win–loss record: 22–31
- Earned run average: 4.83
- Strikeouts: 245
- Stats at Baseball Reference

Teams
- Pittsburgh Pirates (2001–2005); Cincinnati Reds (2006); New York Mets (2006–2007); Yokohama BayStars (2008)

David Aaron Williams (born March 12, 1979) is an American former professional baseball pitcher. He played in Major League Baseball (MLB) for the Pittsburgh Pirates, Cincinnati Reds, and New York Mets, and in Nippon Professional Baseball (NPB) for the Yokohama BayStars.

== Career ==
Williams graduated in 1997 from Caesar Rodney High School in Camden, Delaware, and was drafted by the Pittsburgh Pirates the following year. He made his major league debut on June 6, 2001.

=== 2001 ===
Williams pitched in 22 games, 18 starts for the Pirates, going 3-7 despite having an earned run average of 3.71 in 114 innings.

=== 2002 ===
In 2002, Williams endured a hard season, only pitching for the Pirates in 9 starts.

=== 2003 ===
Williams wasn't called up to the majors, he spent half the season in AAA before going down for the season due to injury.

=== 2004 ===
Williams made his return to Pittsburgh, pitching in 10 games while also starting 6 games.

=== 2005 ===
Williams pitched the whole season in Pittsburgh, going 10-11 while also throwing a complete-game shutout. Williams averaged less than 6 innings, pitching only 138.2 innings in 25 starts.

=== 2006 ===
Williams was traded from the Pirates to the Cincinnati Reds for Sean Casey. On May 20, 2006, the Cincinnati Reds designated Williams for assignment after he went 2–3 with a 7.20 earned run average in eight starts. On May 25, he was traded to the New York Mets for pitcher Robert Manuel.

On August 18, the Mets recalled Williams from the Norfolk Tides to make a start in place of Pedro Martínez. Williams held the St. Louis Cardinals to two runs on seven hits and a walk while striking out four over 6.1 innings to pick up the victory in the Mets' 6–2 win. He finished the season with a 3–1 record and 5.59 earned run average in six appearances—five starts—and 29 innings with the Mets.

=== 2007 ===
The Mets signed Williams to a one-year contract, worth $1.25 million, for the 2007 season, with incentives could have brought as much as $2 million.

In February, Williams had surgery to repair a herniated disc in his neck. He came off the disabled list on July 6, and made his only start of the year against the Houston Astros on July 8, giving up 8 runs in only 3.1 innings. He was then designated for assignment on July 14 so Oliver Pérez could return to the Mets rotation from the disabled list. He was called up again on September 1 when the roster expanded.

=== 2008 ===
Williams signed to pitch for the Yokohama BayStars of Nippon Professional Baseball for the 2008 season on December 12, 2007. He was released on September 3, 2008.

=== 2009 ===
In February 2009, Williams signed a minor league contract with the Washington Nationals with an option for the major leagues. He appeared in 21 games as a relief pitcher for Washington's Double-A affiliate, the Harrisburg Senators with a record of 1-3 and an earned run average of 3.56, and 19 games for their Triple-A affiliate, the Syracuse Chiefs, with a record of 0-1 and an earned run average of 7.89.

He filed for free agency in November 2009. He did not play professionally in 2010. After retiring he played for a semiprofessional team in Long Island. After that he coached with the Toronto Blue Jays.

=== Hall of Fame ===
In 2018 he was inducted into the Delaware Sports Hall of Fame.
