= William Bergolla =

Venezuelan baseball player (born 1983)

- Second baseman
- Born: February 4, 1983 (age 43); Valencia, Carabobo, Venezuela
- Batted: Right Threw: Right

MLB debut
- May 9, 2005, for the Cincinnati Reds

Last MLB appearance
- June 25, 2005, for the Cincinnati Reds

MLB statistics
- Batting average: .132
- Home runs: 0
- Runs batted in: 1
- Stats at Baseball Reference

Teams
- Cincinnati Reds (2005)

William José Bergolla (Spanish pronunciation: [beɾˈɣoʎa]; born February 4, 1983) is a Venezuelan former Major League Baseball (MLB) second baseman. Bergolla was signed by the Cincinnati Reds as a non-drafted free agent in 1999 and made his major league debut on May 9, 2005. He bats and throws right-handed.

== Career ==
Bergolla was rated among the best prospects in the Reds organization, according to Baseball America. For three consecutive years (2002–04), Bergolla led all Reds minor leaguers in stolen bases. He received honorable mention on both the 2001 and 2002 Pioneer League All-Star teams.

In 2003 at Potomac, Bergolla led the High-A Carolina League with 142 hits and ranked among the league leaders in stolen bases (3rd, 52) and runs scored (5th, 77). In the regular season, he had a 10-game hitting streak from May 5–14 (18-for-45, .400) and a season-high 14-game hitting streak from May 20-June 2 (20-for-53, .377).

Bergolla played the 2004 season at Double–A Chattanooga Lookouts. He ranked fourth in the Southern League in stolen bases (36), also led the Lookouts in runs (79), and received his third All-Star berth. Following the season, he played for the Leones del Caracas in the Venezuelan Winter League and hit .281 in 19 games. Before the 2005 season, he was promoted to the Triple–A Louisville Bats of the International League. On August 12, 2006, Bergolla was designated for assignment.

In a five-season minors career, Bergolla hit .289 with 16 home runs, 150 RBI and 143 stolen bases in 443 games.

On November 27, 2007, Bergolla signed a minor league contract with the Washington Nationals that included an invitation to spring training. He became a free agent at the end of the season.

== See also ==
- List of Major League Baseball players from Venezuela
