= 2005 Chicago Cubs season =

2005 Chicago Cubs
- League: National League
- Division: Central
- Ballpark: Wrigley Field
- City: Chicago
- Record: 79–83 (48.8%)
- Divisional place: 4th
- Owners: Tribune Company
- General managers: Jim Hendry
- Managers: Dusty Baker
- Television: CSN Chicago; Superstation WGN; WCIU-TV (Len Kasper, Bob Brenly)
- Radio: WGN (Pat Hughes, Ron Santo)
- Stats: ESPN.com; Baseball Reference

The 2005 Chicago Cubs season was the 134th season of the Chicago Cubs franchise, the 130th in the National League and the 90th at Wrigley Field. The Cubs finished 79–83, fourth place in the National League Central. This was the first season for the WGN-TV broadcast pairing of Bob Brenly and Len Kasper.

== Offseason ==
- December 31, 2004: Todd Hollandsworth was signed as a free agent with the Chicago Cubs.
- January 20, 2005: Cody Ransom was signed as a free agent with the Chicago Cubs.
- February 2, 2005: Sammy Sosa was traded by the Chicago Cubs with cash to the Baltimore Orioles for Jerry Hairston, Mike Fontenot, and Dave Crouthers (minors).
- February 2, 2005: Jeromy Burnitz was signed as a free agent with the Chicago Cubs.
- February 8, 2005: Scott McClain was signed as a free agent with the Chicago Cubs.
- March 30, 2005: Cody Ransom was purchased by the Texas Rangers from the Chicago Cubs.

== Regular season ==
Ryne Sandberg's number 23 was retired by the Chicago Cubs in 2005.

After his Hall of Fame induction, Ryne Sandberg had his number 23 retired in a ceremony at Wrigley Field on August 28, 2005.

=== Season standings ===
==== National League Central ====
NL Central
Team	W	L	Pct.	GB	Home	Road
St. Louis Cardinals	100	62	.617	—	50‍–‍31	50‍–‍31
Houston Astros	89	73	.549	11	53‍–‍28	36‍–‍45
Milwaukee Brewers	81	81	.500	19	46‍–‍35	35‍–‍46
Chicago Cubs	79	83	.488	21	38‍–‍43	41‍–‍40
Cincinnati Reds	73	89	.451	27	42‍–‍39	31‍–‍50
Pittsburgh Pirates	67	95	.414	33	34‍–‍47	33‍–‍48

==== Record vs. opponents ====
2005 National League record Source: MLB Standings Grid – 2005
Team	AZ	ATL	CHC	CIN	COL	FLA	HOU	LAD	MIL	NYM	PHI	PIT	SD	SF	STL	WAS	AL
Arizona	—	3–3	5–2	2–4	11–7	2–4	3–3	13–5	2–4	1–6	3–4	3–4	10–9	7–11	2–5	2–4	8–10
Atlanta	3–3	—	6–1	7–3	2–4	10–8	5–1	3–3	3–3	13–6	9–10	4–3	1–5	4–2	3–3	10–9	7–8
Chicago	2–5	1–6	—	6–9	4–3	5–4	9–7	4–2	7–9	2–4	2–4	11–5	4–3	5–2	10–6	1–5	6–9
Cincinnati	4–2	3–7	9–6	—	3–3	2–4	4–12	3–4	6–10	3–3	3–4	9–7	4–2	3–5	5–11	5–1	7-8
Colorado	7–11	4–2	3–4	3–3	—	3–3	1–5	11–8	1–5	3–4	2–4	3–7	7–11	7–11	4–4	2–4	6–9
Florida	4–2	8–10	4–5	4–2	3–3	—	4–3	5–2	3–4	8–10	9–10	3–4	2–4	4–2	3–4	9–9	10–5
Houston	3–3	1–5	7–9	12–4	5–1	3-4	—	4–2	10–5	5–5	6–0	9–7	4–3	3–4	5–11	5–2	7–8
Los Angeles	5–13	3–3	2–4	4–3	8–11	2–5	2–4	—	5–1	3–3	3–3	5–2	11–7	9–10	2–5	2–4	5–13
Milwaukee	4–2	3–3	9–7	10–6	5–1	4–3	5–10	1–5	—	3–3	4–5	9–7	3–4	4–3	5–11	4–4	8–7
New York	6–1	6–13	4–2	3–3	4–3	10–8	5–5	3–3	3–3	—	11–7	3–3	4–2	3–3	2–5	11–8	5–10
Philadelphia	4-3	10–9	4–2	4–3	4–2	10–9	0–6	3–3	5–4	7–11	—	4–3	6–0	5–1	4–2	11–8	7–8
Pittsburgh	4–3	3–4	5–11	7–9	7–3	4–3	7–9	2–5	7–9	3–3	3–4	—	3–4	2–4	4–12	1–5	5–7
San Diego	9–10	5–1	3–4	2–4	11–7	4–2	3–4	7–11	4–3	2–4	0–6	4–3	—	12–6	4–3	5–1	7–11
San Francisco	11–7	2–4	2–5	5–3	11–7	2–4	4–3	10–9	3–4	3–3	1–5	4–2	6–12	—	2–4	3–3	6–12
St. Louis	5–2	3–3	6–10	11–5	4–4	4-3	11–5	5–2	11–5	5–2	2–4	12–4	3–4	4–2	—	4–2	10–5
Washington	4–2	9–10	5–1	1–5	4–2	9-9	2–5	4–2	4–4	8–11	8–11	5–1	1–5	3–3	2–4	—	12–6

=== Transactions ===
- May 2, 2005: Trenidad Hubbard was signed as a free agent with the Chicago Cubs.
- May 27, 2005: Cody Ransom was signed as a free agent with the Chicago Cubs.
- July 7, 2005: Trenidad Hubbard was released by the Chicago Cubs.
- August 29, 2005: Todd Hollandsworth was traded by the Chicago Cubs to the Atlanta Braves for Angelo Burrows (minors) and Todd Blackford (minors).

=== Roster ===
2005 Chicago Cubs
Roster
Pitchers: 56 Cliff Bartosh; 48 Joe Borowski; 46 Ryan Dempster; 47 Chad Fox; 32 LaTroy Hawkins; 53 Rich Hill; 49 John Koronka; 31 Greg Maddux; 52 Sergio Mitre; 51 Jon Leicester; 44 Roberto Novoa; 50,45 Will Ohman; 22 Mark Prior; 37 Mike Remlinger; 33 Glendon Rusch; 37 Jermaine Van Buren; 40 Todd Wellemeyer; 32 Jerome Williams; 48 Scott Williamson; 34 Kerry Wood; 43 Michael Wuertz; 38 Carlos Zambrano	Catchers: 8 Michael Barrett; 9,24 Henry Blanco; Infielders: 11 Ronny Cedeño; 29 Mike Fontenot; 5 Nomar Garciaparra; 25 Derrek Lee; 1 José Macías; 9 Scott McClain; 13 Neifi Pérez; 16 Aramis Ramírez; 55 Ryan Theriot; 7 Todd Walker; 19 Enrique Wilson; Outfielders: 3 Jeromy Burnitz; 4 Jason Dubois; 9 Jody Gerut; 4 Ben Grieve; 15 Jerry Hairston Jr.; 28 Todd Hollandsworth; 50 Matt Lawton; 19 Matt Murton; 20 Corey Patterson; Other batters: 17 Adam Greenberg; 58 Geovany Soto	Manager: 12 Dusty Baker; Coaches: 2 Gene Clines (hitting); 6 Sonny Jackson (special asst); 59 Juan Lopez (bullpen); 36 Gary Matthews (first base); 39 Dick Pole (bench); 41 Larry Rothschild (pitching); 35 Chris Speier (third base)

== Player stats ==
= Indicates team leader

= Indicates league leader

=== Batting ===
==== Starters by position ====
Note: Pos = Position; G = Games played; AB = At bats; H = Hits; Avg.= Batting average; HR = Home runs; RBI = Runs batted in

Pos	Player	G	AB	H	Avg.	HR	RBI
C	Michael Barrett	133	424	117	.276	16	61
1B	Derrek Lee	158	594	199	.335	46	107
2B	Todd Walker	110	397	121	.305	12	40
SS	Neifi Pérez	154	572	157	.274	9	54
3B	Aramis Ramírez	123	463	140	.302	31	92
LF	Todd Hollandsworth	107	268	68	.254	5	35
CF	Corey Patterson	126	451	97	.215	13	34
RF	Jeromy Burnitz	160	605	156	.258	24	87

==== Other batters ====
Note: G = Games played; AB = At bats; H = Hits; Avg. = Batting average; HR = Home runs; RBI = Runs batted in

Player	G	AB	H	Avg.	HR	RBI
Jerry Hairston Jr.	114	380	99	.261	4	30
Nomar Garciaparra	62	230	65	.283	9	30
José Macías	112	177	45	.254	1	13
Henry Blanco	54	161	39	.242	6	25
Jason Dubois	52	142	34	.239	7	22
Matt Murton	51	140	45	.321	7	14
Ronny Cedeño	41	80	24	.300	1	6
Matt Lawton	19	78	19	.244	1	5
Enrique Wilson	15	22	3	.136	0	0
Ben Grieve	23	20	5	.250	0	1
Jody Gerut	11	14	1	.071	0	0
Scott McClain	13	14	2	.143	0	1
Ryan Theriot	9	13	2	.154	0	0
Mike Fontenot	7	2	0	.000	0	0
Geovany Soto	1	1	0	.000	0	0
Adam Greenberg	1	0	0	----	0	0

=== Pitching ===
==== Starting pitchers ====
Note: G = Games pitched; IP = Innings pitched; W = Wins; L = Losses; ERA = Earned run average; SO = Strikeouts

Player	G	IP	W	L	ERA	SO
Greg Maddux	35	225.0	13	15	4.24	136
Carlos Zambrano	33	223.1	14	6	3.26	202
Mark Prior	27	166.2	11	7	3.67	188
Jerome Williams	18	106.0	6	8	3.91	59
John Koronka	4	15.2	1	2	7.47	10

==== Other pitchers ====
Note: G = Games pitched; IP = Innings pitched; W = Wins; L = Losses; ERA = Earned run average; SO = Strikeouts

Player	G	IP	W	L	ERA	SO
Glendon Rusch	46	145.1	9	8	4.52	111
Kerry Wood	21	66.0	3	4	4.23	77
Sergio Mitre	21	60.1	2	5	5.37	37
Rich Hill	10	23.2	0	2	9.13	21
Jon Leicester	6	9.0	0	2	9.00	7

==== Relief pitchers ====
Note: G = Games pitched; W = Wins; L = Losses; SV = Saves; ERA = Earned run average; SO = Strikeouts

Player	G	W	L	SV	ERA	SO
Ryan Dempster	63	5	3	33	3.13	89
Michael Wuertz	75	6	2	0	3.81	89
Will Ohman	69	2	2	0	2.91	45
Roberto Novoa	49	4	5	0	4.43	47
Mike Remlinger	35	0	3	0	4.91	30
Todd Wellemeyer	22	2	1	1	6.12	32
LaTroy Hawkins	21	1	4	4	3.32	13
Cliff Bartosh	19	0	2	0	5.49	15
Scott Williamson	17	0	0	0	5.65	23
Joe Borowski	11	0	0	0	6.55	11
Chad Fox	11	0	0	1	6.75	11
Jermaine Van Buren	6	0	2	0	3.00	3

== Farm system ==
Level	Team	League	Manager
AAA	Iowa Cubs	Pacific Coast League	Mike Quade
AA	West Tenn Diamond Jaxx	Southern League	Bobby Dickerson
A	Daytona Cubs	Florida State League	Richie Zisk
A	Peoria Chiefs	Midwest League	Julio Garcia
A-Short Season	Boise Hawks	Northwest League	Trey Forkerway
Rookie	AZL Cubs	Arizona League	Steve McFarland
