= Brian Dallimore =

American baseball player (born 1973)

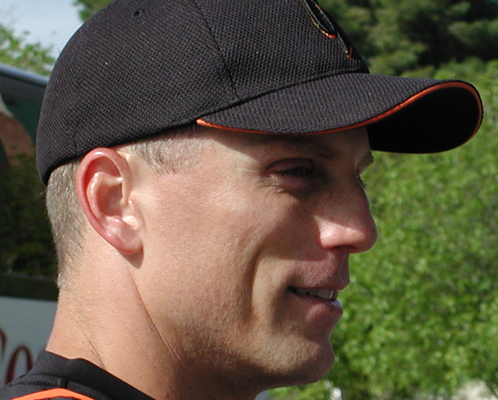
- Dallimore with the San Francisco Giants in 2005
- Infielder
- Born: November 15, 1973 (age 53); Las Vegas, Nevada, U.S.
- Batted: Right Threw: Right

MLB debut
- April 29, 2004, for the San Francisco Giants

Last MLB appearance
- July 8, 2005, for the San Francisco Giants

MLB statistics
- Batting average: .260
- Home runs: 1
- Runs batted in: 7
- Stats at Baseball Reference

Teams
- San Francisco Giants (2004–2005)

Brian Scott Dallimore (born November 15, 1973) is an American former baseball player in Major League Baseball (MLB). He was an infielder for the San Francisco Giants from 2004 to 2005. Dallimore did not make his major league debut until he was 30 years old, when he hit a grand slam for his first major league hit.

== College ==
Dallimore played college baseball for the Stanford Cardinal. He set the school record for being hit by a pitch the most times in a season. He played for the United States national team in the 1994 Baseball World Cup.

== Minor leagues ==
As a 25-year-old who was being held back in Class A, he was converted to a utility player.

Playing for the Fresno Grizzlies in 2003, Dallimore led the Pacific Coast League in batting average with a .352 average. In 2004, he was invited to the San Francisco Giants' spring training, and he won the Harry S. Jordan award, presented each year to a player in his first big-league camp "whose performance and dedication in spring training best exemplifies the San Francisco Giants spirit." He was sent down to Fresno to start the season, and sportswriters were labelling him a journeyman.

== Major leagues ==
After playing 828 minor league games over nine seasons, Dallimore made his major league debut with the San Francisco Giants as a 30-year-old rookie on April 29, 2004. In his first major league start on April 30, Dallimore hit a grand slam for his first major league hit. He joined Bobby Bonds as the second player in Giants history to get a grand slam as his first hit, and he was the fifth player in MLB history since 1974 to accomplish the feat. Dallimore got on base five times in the game, with three hits, a walk, and a hit by pitch.

Dallimore announced his retirement on February 24, 2006.

== Personal ==
Dallimore and his late wife, Kimberly, have been friends since they were five years old. They have 3 children, one son, Brady, currently plays baseball at Ole Miss.
