= Yamid Haad =

Colombian baseball player (born 1977)

- Catcher
- Born: September 2, 1977 (age 48); Cartagena, Colombia
- Batted: Right Threw: Right

MLB debut
- July 5, 1999, for the Pittsburgh Pirates

Last MLB appearance
- October 1, 2005, for the San Francisco Giants

MLB statistics
- Batting average: .069
- Home runs: 0
- Runs batted in: 1
- Stats at Baseball Reference

Teams
- Pittsburgh Pirates (1999); San Francisco Giants (2005)

Yamid Salcedo Haad (born September 2, 1977) is a Colombian former professional baseball catcher who played in Major League Baseball (MLB) for the Pittsburgh Pirates and San Francisco Giants.

== Career ==
In a brief stint with the Pittsburgh Pirates in 1999, Haad went 0-for-1 in one game played. In 2005, he served as the Giant's backup catcher behind Mike Matheny since previous backup Yorvit Torrealba was traded to the Seattle Mariners. Haad's playing time with the Giants was limited to only 10 starts, with Matheny starting the large majority of games, until a steroids suspension ended his season. For the year, he had only two hits in 28 at-bats, for a batting average of .071.

On December 1, 2006, the Tampa Bay Devil Rays signed him to a minor league contract and invited him to spring training for the 2007 season. On April 9, 2007, Haad signed a minor league contract with the Cleveland Indians.

On June 12, 2008, Haad was called up by the Indians, but on June 19, Haad was designated for assignment in favor of veteran catcher Sal Fasano without appearing in a game.

In February 2009, Haad signed a minor league contract with the Seattle Mariners.

Haad played for the Tecolotes de Nuevo Laredo of the Mexican League in 2010.

== Steroids ==
On May 31, 2006, Haad received a 50-game suspension for testing positive for performance-enhancing drugs.
