= 2005 Major League Baseball season =

2005 MLB season
- League: Major League Baseball
- Sport: Baseball
- Duration: April 3 – October 26, 2005
- Games: 162
- Teams: 30
- TV partner(s): Fox; ESPN

Draft
- Top draft pick: Justin Upton
- Picked by: Arizona Diamondbacks

Regular season
- Season MVP: AL: Alex Rodriguez (NYY); NL: Albert Pujols (STL)

Postseason
- AL champions: Chicago White Sox
- AL runners-up: Los Angeles Angels
- NL champions: Houston Astros
- NL runners-up: St. Louis Cardinals

World Series
- Champions: Chicago White Sox
- Runners-up: Houston Astros
- World Series MVP: Jermaine Dye (CWS)

MLB seasons
- ← 2004 2006 →

Locations of AL teams for the 2005–2007 MLB seasons
West Central East
Locations of NL teams for the 2005 MLB season
West Central East

The 2005 Major League Baseball season was notable for the league's new steroid policy in the wake of the BALCO scandal, which enforced harsher penalties than ever before for steroid use in Major League Baseball. Several players, including veteran Rafael Palmeiro, were suspended under the new policy. Besides the cracking down on steroids, it was also notable that every team in the NL East finished the season with at least 81 wins (at least half of the 162 games played). Additionally it was the first season featuring a baseball team in Washington, D.C. since the second iteration of the Washington Senators last played there in 1971; the Washington Nationals had moved from Montreal, the first relocation of a team in 33 years.

The Anaheim Angels changed their name to the Los Angeles Angels.

The season ended when the Chicago White Sox defeated the Houston Astros in a four-game sweep in the World Series, winning their first championship since 1917.

This was the last season in which no no-hit games were pitched until 2025; 2005 was also only the 6th year since 1949 in which no such games were thrown.^{[a]}

This was the first season since 1993 that all teams played at least 162 games with no cancellations.

== Standings ==
=== American League ===
AL East
Team	W	L	Pct.	GB	Home	Road
^{(3)} New York Yankees	95	67	.586	—	53‍–‍28	42‍–‍39
^{(4)} Boston Red Sox	95	67	.586	—	54‍–‍27	41‍–‍40
Toronto Blue Jays	80	82	.494	15	43‍–‍38	37‍–‍44
Baltimore Orioles	74	88	.457	21	36‍–‍45	38‍–‍43
Tampa Bay Devil Rays	67	95	.414	28	40‍–‍41	27‍–‍54

AL Central
Team	W	L	Pct.	GB	Home	Road
^{(1)} Chicago White Sox	99	63	.611	—	47‍–‍34	52‍–‍29
Cleveland Indians	93	69	.574	6	43‍–‍38	50‍–‍31
Minnesota Twins	83	79	.512	16	45‍–‍36	38‍–‍43
Detroit Tigers	71	91	.438	28	39‍–‍42	32‍–‍49
Kansas City Royals	56	106	.346	43	34‍–‍47	22‍–‍59

AL West
Team	W	L	Pct.	GB	Home	Road
^{(2)} Los Angeles Angels	95	67	.586	—	49‍–‍32	46‍–‍35
Oakland Athletics	88	74	.543	7	45‍–‍36	43‍–‍38
Texas Rangers	79	83	.488	16	44‍–‍37	35‍–‍46
Seattle Mariners	69	93	.426	26	39‍–‍42	30‍–‍51

=== National League ===
NL East
Team	W	L	Pct.	GB	Home	Road
^{(2)} Atlanta Braves	90	72	.556	—	53‍–‍28	37‍–‍44
Philadelphia Phillies	88	74	.543	2	46‍–‍35	42‍–‍39
Florida Marlins	83	79	.512	7	45‍–‍36	38‍–‍43
New York Mets	83	79	.512	7	48‍–‍33	35‍–‍46
Washington Nationals	81	81	.500	9	41‍–‍40	40‍–‍41

NL Central
Team	W	L	Pct.	GB	Home	Road
^{(1)} St. Louis Cardinals	100	62	.617	—	50‍–‍31	50‍–‍31
^{(4)} Houston Astros	89	73	.549	11	53‍–‍28	36‍–‍45
Milwaukee Brewers	81	81	.500	19	46‍–‍35	35‍–‍46
Chicago Cubs	79	83	.488	21	38‍–‍43	41‍–‍40
Cincinnati Reds	73	89	.451	27	42‍–‍39	31‍–‍50
Pittsburgh Pirates	67	95	.414	33	34‍–‍47	33‍–‍48

NL West
Team	W	L	Pct.	GB	Home	Road
^{(3)} San Diego Padres	82	80	.506	—	46‍–‍35	36‍–‍45
Arizona Diamondbacks	77	85	.475	5	36‍–‍45	41‍–‍40
San Francisco Giants	75	87	.463	7	37‍–‍44	38‍–‍43
Los Angeles Dodgers	71	91	.438	11	40‍–‍41	31‍–‍50
Colorado Rockies	67	95	.414	15	40‍–‍41	27‍–‍54

== Postseason ==
=== Bracket ===
Division Series (ALDS, NLDS)
1	Chicago White Sox	3
4	Boston	0
American League
2	LA Angels	3
3	NY Yankees	2
1	St. Louis	3
3	San Diego	0
National League
2	Atlanta	1
4	Houston	3

League Championship Series (NLCS, ALCS)
1	Chicago White Sox	4
2	LA Angels	1
1	St. Louis	2
4	Houston	4

World Series
AL1	Chicago White Sox	4
NL4	Houston	0

Note: Two teams in the same division could not meet in the division series.

== Statistical leaders ==
=== Batting ===
==== Team ====
Statistic	American League		National League	
Runs scored	Boston Red Sox	910	Cincinnati Reds	820
Hits	Boston Red Sox	1579	Chicago Cubs	1506
Home runs	Texas Rangers	260	Cincinnati Reds	222
Batting average	Boston Red Sox	.272	San Francisco Giants	.281
Stolen bases	Los Angeles Angels	161	New York Mets	153

==== Individual ====
Statistic	American League		National League	
Batting average	Michael Young (Texas)	.331	Derrek Lee (Chicago)	.335
Runs scored	Alex Rodriguez (New York)	124	Albert Pujols (St. Louis)	129
Hits	Michael Young (Texas)	221	Derrek Lee (Chicago)	199
Home runs	Alex Rodriguez (New York)	48	Andruw Jones (Atlanta)	51
Runs batted in	David Ortiz (Boston)	148	Andruw Jones (Atlanta)	128
Stolen bases	Chone Figgins (Los Angeles)	62	José Reyes (New York)	60

=== Pitching ===
==== Team ====
Statistic	American League		National League	
Runs allowed	Cleveland Indians	642	Houston Astros	609
Earned run average	Chicago White Sox; Cleveland Indians	3.61	St. Louis Cardinals	3.49
Hits allowed	Oakland Athletics	1315	Houston Astros	1336
Home runs allowed	Oakland Athletics	154	New York Mets	135
Strikeouts	Los Angeles Angels of Anaheim	1126	Chicago Cubs	1256

==== Individual ====
Statistic	American League		National League	
Earned run average	Kevin Millwood (Cleveland)	2.86	Roger Clemens (Houston)	1.87
Wins	Bartolo Colón (Los Angeles)	21	Dontrelle Willis (Florida)	22
Saves	Francisco Rodríguez (Los Angeles); Bob Wickman (Cleveland)	45	Chad Cordero (Washington)	47
Strikeouts	Johan Santana (Minnesota)	238	Jake Peavy (San Diego)	216

== Managers ==
=== American League ===
Team	Manager	Comments
Los Angeles Angels	Mike Scioscia	
Baltimore Orioles	Sam Perlozzo	
Boston Red Sox	Terry Francona	
Chicago White Sox	Ozzie Guillén	Won the World Series
Cleveland Indians	Eric Wedge	
Detroit Tigers±	Alan Trammell	
Kansas City Royals	Tony Peña	Replaced during the season by Bob Schaefer
Minnesota Twins	Ron Gardenhire	
New York Yankees	Joe Torre	
Oakland Athletics	Ken Macha	
Seattle Mariners	Mike Hargrove	
Tampa Bay Devil Rays	Lou Piniella	
Texas Rangers	Buck Showalter	
Toronto Blue Jays	John Gibbons	

=== National League ===
Team	Manager	Comments
Arizona Diamondbacks	Bob Melvin	
Atlanta Braves	Bobby Cox	
Chicago Cubs	Dusty Baker	
Cincinnati Reds	Dave Miley	Replaced during the season by Jerry Narron
Colorado Rockies	Clint Hurdle	
Florida Marlins	Jack McKeon	
Houston Astros	Phil Garner	Won the National League pennant
Los Angeles Dodgers	Jim Tracy	
Milwaukee Brewers	Ned Yost	
New York Mets	Willie Randolph	
Philadelphia Phillies	Charlie Manuel	
Pittsburgh Pirates	Lloyd McClendon	Replaced during the season by Pete Mackanin
St. Louis Cardinals	Tony La Russa	
San Diego Padres	Bruce Bochy	
San Francisco Giants	Felipe Alou	
Washington Nationals	Frank Robinson	

±hosted the MLB All Star Game

== Awards and honors ==
Baseball Writers' Association of America Awards
BBWAA Award	National League	American League
Rookie of the Year	Ryan Howard (PHI)	Huston Street (OAK)
Cy Young Award	Chris Carpenter (STL)	Bartolo Colón (LAA)
Manager of the Year	Bobby Cox (ATL)	Ozzie Guillén (CWS)
Most Valuable Player	Albert Pujols (STL)	Alex Rodriguez (NYY)
Gold Glove Awards
Position	National League	American League
Pitcher	Greg Maddux (CHC)	Kenny Rogers (MIN)
Catcher	Mike Matheny (SF)	Jason Varitek (BOS)
1st Base	Derrek Lee (CHC)	Mark Teixeira (TEX)
2nd Base	Luis Castillo (FLA)	Orlando Hudson (TOR)
3rd Base	Mike Lowell (FLA)	Eric Chavez (OAK)
Shortstop	Omar Vizquel (SF)	Derek Jeter (NYY)
Outfield	Bobby Abreu (PHI); Jim Edmonds (STL); Andruw Jones (ATL)	Torii Hunter (MIN); Ichiro Suzuki (SEA); Vernon Wells (TOR)
Silver Slugger Awards
Position	National League	American League
Pitcher/Designated Hitter	Jason Marquis (STL)	David Ortiz (BOS)
Catcher	Michael Barrett (CHC)	Jason Varitek (BOS)
1st Base	Derrek Lee (CHC)	Mark Teixeira (TEX)
2nd Base	Jeff Kent (LAD)	Alfonso Soriano (TEX)
3rd Base	Morgan Ensberg (HOU)	Alex Rodriguez (NYY)
Shortstop	Felipe López (CIN)	Miguel Tejada (BAL)
Outfield	Miguel Cabrera (FLA); Andruw Jones (ATL); Carlos Lee (MIL)	Vladimir Guerrero (LAA); Manny Ramirez (BOS); Gary Sheffield (NYY)

=== Other awards ===
- Comeback Players of the Year: Jason Giambi (Designated hitter/first baseman, NYY, American); Ken Griffey Jr. (Center fielder, CIN, National).
- Edgar Martínez Award (Best designated hitter): David Ortiz (BOS)
- Hank Aaron Award: David Ortiz (BOS, American); Andruw Jones (ATL, National).
- Roberto Clemente Award (Humanitarian): John Smoltz (ATL).
- Rolaids Relief Man Award: Mariano Rivera (NYY, American); Chad Cordero (WSH, National).
- Delivery Man of the Year (Best Reliever): Mariano Rivera (NYY).
- Warren Spahn Award (Best left-handed pitcher): Dontrelle Willis (FLA)

=== Player of the Month ===
Month	American League	National League
April	Brian Roberts	Derrek Lee
May	Alex Rodriguez	Bobby Abreu
June	Travis Hafner	Andruw Jones
July	Jason Giambi	Adam Dunn
August	Alex Rodriguez	Andruw Jones
September	David Ortiz	Randy Winn

=== Pitcher of the Month ===
Month	American League	National League
April	Jon Garland	Dontrelle Willis
May	Kenny Rogers	Trevor Hoffman
June	Mark Buehrle	Chad Cordero
July	Barry Zito	Andy Pettitte
August	Bartolo Colón	Noah Lowry
September	José Contreras	Andy Pettitte

=== Rookie of the Month ===
Month	American League	National League
April	Gustavo Chacín	Clint Barmes
May	Damon Hollins	Ryan Church
June	Joe Blanton	Garrett Atkins
July	Gustavo Chacín	Zach Duke
August	Joe Blanton	Zach Duke
September	Robinson Canó	Ryan Howard

== Home field attendance and payroll ==
Team name	Wins	%±	Home attendance	%±	Per game	Est. payroll	%±
New York Yankees	95	−5.9%	4,090,696	8.4%	50,502	$208,306,817	13.1%
Los Angeles Dodgers	71	−23.7%	3,603,646	3.3%	44,489	$83,039,000	−10.6%
St. Louis Cardinals	100	−4.8%	3,538,988	16.1%	43,691	$92,106,833	9.2%
Los Angeles Angels	95	3.3%	3,404,686	0.9%	42,033	$94,867,822	−5.6%
San Francisco Giants	75	−17.6%	3,181,023	−2.3%	39,272	$90,199,500	10.0%
Chicago Cubs	79	−11.2%	3,099,992	−2.2%	38,272	$87,032,933	−3.9%
San Diego Padres	82	−5.7%	2,869,787	−4.9%	35,429	$63,290,833	14.3%
Boston Red Sox	95	−3.1%	2,847,888	0.4%	35,159	$123,505,125	−3.0%
New York Mets	83	16.9%	2,829,929	22.0%	34,937	$101,305,821	−0.7%
Houston Astros	89	−3.3%	2,804,760	−9.2%	34,627	$76,779,000	1.8%
Washington Nationals	81	20.9%	2,731,993	264.5%	33,728	$48,581,500	17.9%
Seattle Mariners	69	9.5%	2,725,459	−7.3%	33,648	$87,754,334	7.7%
Philadelphia Phillies	88	2.3%	2,665,304	−18.0%	32,905	$95,522,000	2.5%
Baltimore Orioles	74	−5.1%	2,624,740	−4.3%	32,404	$73,914,333	43.2%
Texas Rangers	79	−11.2%	2,525,221	0.5%	31,176	$55,849,000	1.5%
Atlanta Braves	90	−6.3%	2,521,167	8.3%	31,126	$86,457,302	−4.1%
Chicago White Sox	99	19.3%	2,342,833	21.4%	28,924	$75,178,000	15.3%
Milwaukee Brewers	81	20.9%	2,211,023	7.2%	27,297	$39,934,833	45.1%
Oakland Athletics	88	−3.3%	2,109,118	−4.2%	26,038	$55,425,762	−6.7%
Arizona Diamondbacks	77	51.0%	2,059,424	−18.3%	25,425	$62,629,166	−10.2%
Minnesota Twins	83	−9.8%	2,034,243	6.4%	25,114	$56,186,000	4.3%
Detroit Tigers	71	−1.4%	2,024,431	5.6%	24,993	$69,092,000	47.5%
Toronto Blue Jays	80	19.4%	2,014,995	6.1%	24,876	$45,719,500	−8.6%
Cleveland Indians	93	16.3%	2,013,763	11.0%	24,861	$41,502,500	20.9%
Cincinnati Reds	73	−3.9%	1,943,067	−15.0%	23,696	$61,892,583	31.9%
Colorado Rockies	67	−1.5%	1,914,389	−18.1%	23,634	$47,839,000	−26.9%
Florida Marlins	83	0.0%	1,852,608	7.5%	22,872	$60,408,834	43.3%
Pittsburgh Pirates	67	−6.9%	1,817,245	15.0%	22,435	$38,133,000	18.3%
Kansas City Royals	56	−3.4%	1,371,181	−17.5%	16,928	$36,881,000	−22.5%
Tampa Bay Devil Rays	67	−4.3%	1,141,669	−10.5%	14,095	$29,679,067	−0.6%

== Television coverage ==
This was the fifth season that national television coverage was split between ESPN and Fox Sports. ESPN and ESPN2 aired selected weeknight and Sunday night games, and selected Division Series playoff games. Fox televised Saturday baseball, the All-Star Game, selected Division Series games, both League Championship Series, and the World Series.

== Events ==
- March 24 – a spring training game between the Arizona Diamondbacks and the Colorado Rockies was abandoned after five innings because of a swarm of bees which settled over the field.
- April 29 – The highly anticipated matchup of Roger Clemens of the Houston Astros vs. Greg Maddux of the Chicago Cubs took place at Minute Maid Park, two of the most acclaimed pitchers of the modern era (between them are 11 Cy Young awards—7 and 4, respectively). Both Clemens and Maddux had 300 career wins at this point in their careers, a feat that is arguably impossible for modern era pitchers to achieve since the advent of middle and closing relief rosters. The Cubs went on to win the game 3–2.
- June 18 – Derek Jeter of the New York Yankees hits the first grand slam of his 11-year major league career, as the Yankees defeat the Chicago Cubs 8–1.
- July 15 – Rafael Palmeiro of the Baltimore Orioles became the 26th member of the 3,000-hit club with a double in the fifth inning against the Seattle Mariners.
- July 26 – Greg Maddux of the Chicago Cubs recorded his 3,000th career strikeout by striking out Omar Vizquel of the San Francisco Giants in the third inning. Maddux became the 13th to reach this mark in Major League history.

== See also ==
- 2005 Nippon Professional Baseball season

== Notes ==
^{a} Major League Baseball seasons since 1901 without a no-hitter pitched are 1909, 1913, 1921, 1927–1928, 1932–1933, 1936, 1939, 1942–1943, 1949, 1959, 1982, 1985, 1989, 2000, 2005 and 2025.
