= 2005 Houston Astros season =

44th season in Major League Baseball for the Houston Astros

2005 Houston Astros
- National League champions National League Wild Card winners
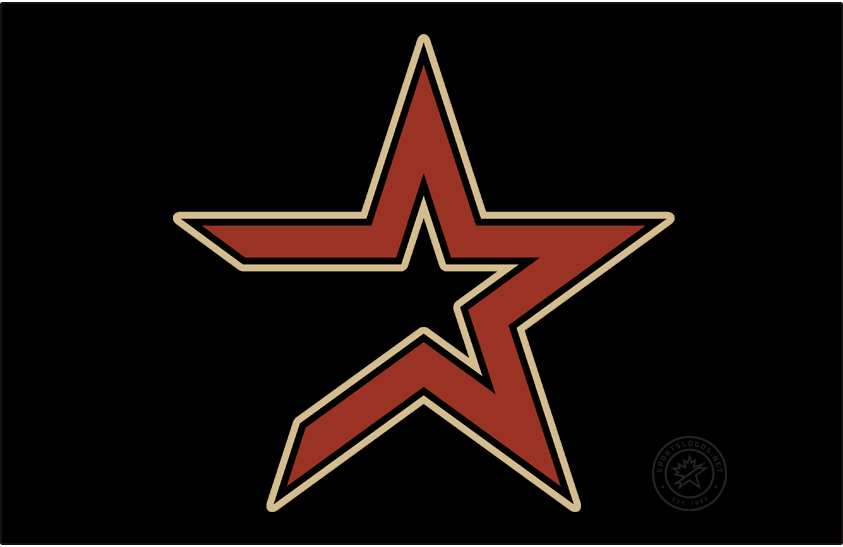
- League: National League
- Division: Central
- Ballpark: Minute Maid Park
- City: Houston, Texas
- Record: 89–73–1 (.549)
- Divisional place: 2nd
- Owners: Drayton McLane Jr.
- General managers: Tim Purpura
- Managers: Phil Garner
- Television: KNWS-TV; FSN Southwest (Bill Brown, Larry Dierker, Jim Deshaies)
- Radio: KTRH (Milo Hamilton, Alan Ashby); KLAT (Francisco Ernesto Ruiz, Alex Treviño)
- Stats: ESPN.com; Baseball Reference

The 2005 Houston Astros season was the 44th season for the Major League Baseball (MLB) franchise located in Houston, Texas, their 41st as the Astros, 44th in the National League (NL), 12th in the NL Central division, and sixth at Minute Maid Park. The Astros entered the season with a 92–70 record, having qualified for their first-ever Wild Card title, runners-up in the NL Central, and 13 games behind the division-champion and NL pennant-winning St. Louis Cardinals. However, the Astros' season halted after defeat in a classic, 7-game National League Championship Series (NLCS) to the Cardinals.

On April 5, Roy Oswalt made his third consecutive Opening Day start for the Astros, who hosted St. Louis, but were defeated, 7–3. In the amateur draft, the Astros' first round selections included left-handed pitcher Brian Bogusevic (24th overall) and outfielder Eli Iorg (38th). On June 25, the Astros retired the uniform number 24 worn by former outfielder Jimmy Wynn, the first player in club history to steal 40 bases (1965) and hit 30 home runs (1967) in one season. With expectations of a deeper postseason run in 2005, Houston initially underperformed, starting at 15–30.

Four Astros were selected to the MLB All-Star game, including pitchers Roger Clemens, Brad Lidge, and Oswalt, and third baseman Morgan Ensberg. It was the 11th career selection for Clemens, and first for each of Oswalt, Lidge, and Ensberg. On September 10, Craig Biggio became the 13th major leaguer to attain 600 doubles.

The Astros rebounded to win 74 of the final 117 games (.632 winning percentage) and posted an 89–73 overall record, runners-up in the NL Central for a fourth consecutive season and 11 games behind the repeat division-champion St. Louis Cardinals. In the Wild Card race, the Astros finished one game ahead of the Philadelphia Phillies to obtain both their second-consecutive NL Wild Card title and playoff berth. It was the Astros' sixth playoff appearance in a span of nine seasons. The ninth postseason appearance overall in franchise history, it was their second wild card qualification.

The Astros faced the Atlanta Braves for their fifth matchup in nine seasons in the National League Division Series (NLDS) format. Houston triumphed in a second consecutive NLDS, capped by the series-ending walk-off home run by Chris Burke in the 18th inning. A second consecutive rematch with St. Louis in the NLCS awaited Houston, this time yielding a 4-games-to-2 victory for their first-ever NL pennant and World Series appearance. Oswalt, who won both of his starts and allowed just 2 earned runs over 14 innings pitched (IP) for a 1.29 earned run average (ERA), was recognized as NLCS MVP. However, the Astros were swept by the Chicago White Sox, 4 games to 0, in the World Series.

Clemens won the regular season NL earned run average (1.87 ERA) title. Biggio was recognized with the Hutch Award, Ensberg with a Silver Slugger Award, and center fielder Willy Taveras as the Players Choice Award winner for NL Outstanding Rookie, The Sporting News NL Rookie of the Year, (Note: From 1961–2003, The Sporting News declared one rookie position player and one rookie pitcher from each league, the NL and the American League (AL), for this award. Starting in 2004, one rookie was selected for each league, regardless of position.) and to the Topps All-Rookie Team. Joining Wynn in receiving career accolades were Biggio and Jeff Bagwell as inductees into the Texas Sports Hall of Fame and recipients of Baseball Americas Lifetime Achievement Award, with executive Tal Smith also being conferred the latter honor.

The 2005 season was the Astros' final playoff appearance as a National League team, and for the next ten seasons, until 2015, after having transitioned to the American League.

== Offseason ==
=== Summary ===
The Houston Astros concluded the 2004 epoch with a 92–70 (.568) record, 13 games behind the NL Central division champion St. Louis Cardinals. In the NL Wild Card race, the Astros finished a game ahead of the San Francisco Giants to capture their first-ever Wild Card title. The Astros won the National League Division Series (NLDS), 3-games-to-2, over the Atlanta Braves. Hence, the Astros triumphed in a playoff series for the first time in franchise history, while also defeating Atlanta in a playoff series on their fourth attempt. The team set an all-time regular season home attendance record of 3,087,872, surpassing 3.056,139 in 2000, the first time they had reached 3 million. Right-hander Roger Clemens became the second Astro to win the Cy Young Award, the seventh of his career, and Carlos Beltrán became the second Astro to join the 30–30 club, following Jeff Bagwell. (Note: During the 1997 and 1999 seasons.)

In February 2005, longtime Astros players Jeff Bagwell and Craig Biggio were jointly inducted into the Texas Sports Hall of Fame.

Outfielder Lance Berkman missed the start of the regular season recuperating from knee surgery.

=== Transactions ===
- January 7, 2005: Adam Riggs was signed as a free agent with the Houston Astros.
- January 7, 2005: Turk Wendell was signed as a free agent with the Houston Astros.
- January 23, 2005: John Franco signed as a free agent with the Houston Astros.
- February 11, 2005: Trenidad Hubbard was signed as a free agent with the Houston Astros.

== Regular season ==
=== Summary ===
==== April ====
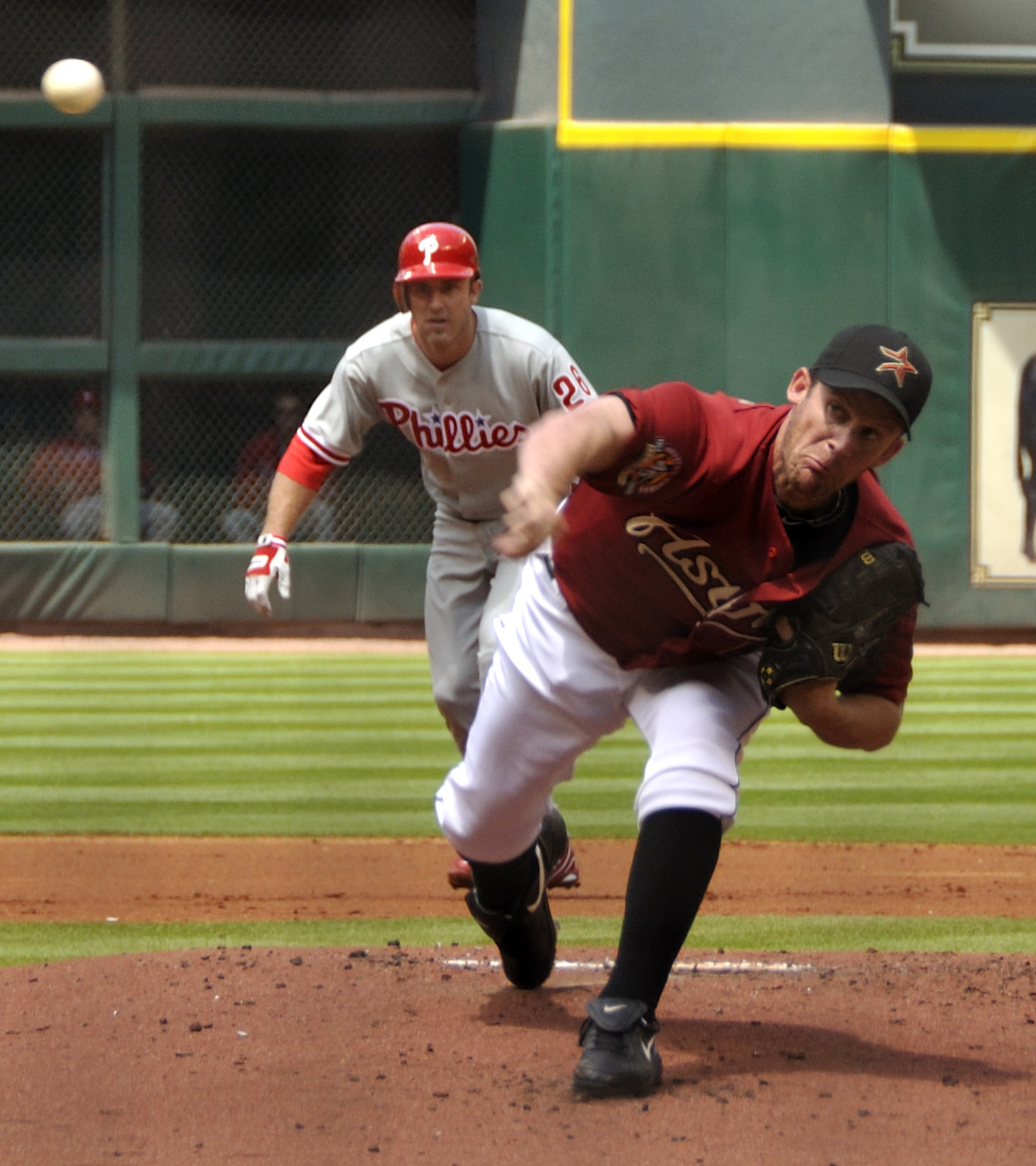
Opening Day starting pitcher Roy Oswalt with Chase Utley in the background.

Opening Day starting lineup
Uniform	Player	Position
28	Adam Everett	Shortstop
7	Craig Biggio	Second baseman
5	Jeff Bagwell	First baseman
14	Morgan Ensberg	Third baseman
30	Luke Scott (Note: Major league debut.)	Left fielder
16	Jason Lane	Right fielder
11	Brad Ausmus	Catcher
1	Willy Taveras	Center fielder
44	Roy Oswalt	Pitcher
Venue: Minute Maid Park • St. Louis 7, Houston 3 Sources:

Houston's 44th season arose with Roy Oswalt on the mound, who bore uniform number 44. The Astros hosted the St. Louis Cardinals, also the last team they had faced in defeat in a classic, seven-game 2004 National League Championship Series (NLCS). St. Louis countered with Chris Carpenter. Oswalt was not sharp, as he yielded six runs over six innings, including serving home runs to Jim Edmonds and Reggie Sanders. Oswalt took the defeat in a 7–3 loss. Craig Biggio doubled among three hits and drove in each of Houston's tallies.

On April 16, center fielder Willy Taveras cranked his first major league home run, during the bottom of the seventh off right-hander Jorge Sosa of the Atlanta Braves. A solo shot at Minute Maid Park, it gave the Astros an insurance run to increase their lead to 5 to 3. Five-to-three stood as the final score. Taveras also drew a base on balls, pilfered a base, and scored twice. Brandon Backe earned the quality start and first victory of the season, tossing seven innings in which he scattered seven hits, one walk, and struck out eight. John Franco (2) and Russ Springer (2) each worked a scoreless inning to earn the hold, and Brad Lidge followed by converting his fourth save.

On April 23, the Astros lost a third consecutive 1–0 decision in extra innings started by Roger Clemens. Clemens had surrendered just one earned run through four starts for a 0.32 earned run average (ERA).

The Astros, hosting the Chicago Cubs on April 29, featured a matchup between Clemens and fellow 300-game winner, Greg Maddux. Clemens worked 7 innings with three runs allowed and four strikeouts, while Maddux surrendered two runs over six innings, striking out three. First baseman Jeff Bagwell, who was playing through injury, hit his final major league home run against Maddux on April 29, tying him for the most against any pitcher with seven. With the contest tied 2–2, Conroe native Jeromy Burnitz led off the seventh with a home run, allowing Maddux to get the win as the Cubs won, 3–2. The 306th win of Maddux' career, Clemens entered the game with 329. The Clemens–Maddux duel was the first time in the major leagues that two pitchers who had already attained 300 or more career wins faced each other since Don Sutton of the California Angels and Steve Carlton of the Minnesota Twins on August 4, 1987. It was the first such matchup in the National League (NL) since July 21, 1892, when Tim Keefe of the Philadelphia Phillies pitched against Jim "Pud" Galvin of the St. Louis Browns.

==== May ====
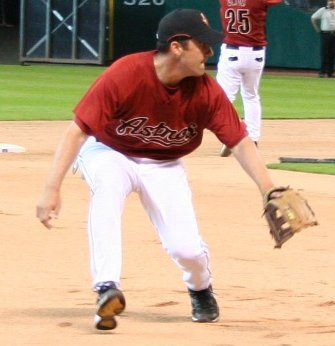
Mike Lamb on the infield at Minute Maid Park.

Mike Lamb swatted his first career grand slam on May 1, off Mark Prior of the Chicago Cubs, a go-ahead drive to give Houston the 5–3 edge. Later in the fifth, Adam Everett took Prior deep for three more tallies. Lamb picked up another RBI the next inning off Glendon Rusch, singling in Biggio. Oswalt (4–2) diffused 10 Cubs hits and three runs over five innings to pick up the victory. This was Lamb's second career five-RBI bout.

On May 5, Jeff Bagwell removed himself from the lineup. It was later announced that he would undergo capsular release surgery on his arthritic right shoulder with the goal of extending his career.

Filling in for Bagwell, on May 15, Morgan Ensberg launched a career day, blasting three home runs with 5 RBI to lead the way for the Astros, who routed the San Francisco Giants, 9–0. He became the eighth player in team history to crank three home runs in a game, and first since Richard Hidalgo on September 16, 2003. (Note: The eleventh time overall by an Astros player, Carlos Lee became the next Astro to achieve this feat on April 13, 2007.) Ensberg also stroked his third career four-hit game, and both of the three home runs and five RBI established single-game career highs.

After another defeat as of May 24, the Astros occupied last place in the NL Central with a 15–30 (.333) performance, 14 games behind the first-place Cardinals. This was Houston's seventh consecutive defeat for the team's longest losing streak of the season.

The Astros won over the Cubs on May 25 at Wrigley Field, led by seven solid innings from Brandon Backe (4–3), who defeated Greg Maddux (2–3). Turning in a quality start, Backe surrendered seven hits, one walk, and one run over seven frames, singled at the plate, and scored. Ensberg (9) took Maddux deep during the fifth inning, and Lance Berkman tallied two hits and an RBI. Backe and Willy Taveras each pilfered a base.

==== June ====
On June 7, Chris Burke swatted his first Major League home run, during the seventh inning off Pedro Martinez of the New York Mets. Burke's home run ended Martinez' no-hit bid at 6 1/3 innings. To this point, no Mets pitcher had ever tossed a no-hitter. (Note: The first no-hitter by the Mets was hurled by former Astros prospect Johan Santana on June 1, 2012.) Martinez (7–1) otherwise remained dominant, striking out 12 Astros in a two-hit complete game to outduel Roy Oswalt (6–7) and lead a 3–1 Mets' victory. Martinez' effort earned a game score of 90.

==== Retirement of Jim Wynn's uniform number 24 ====
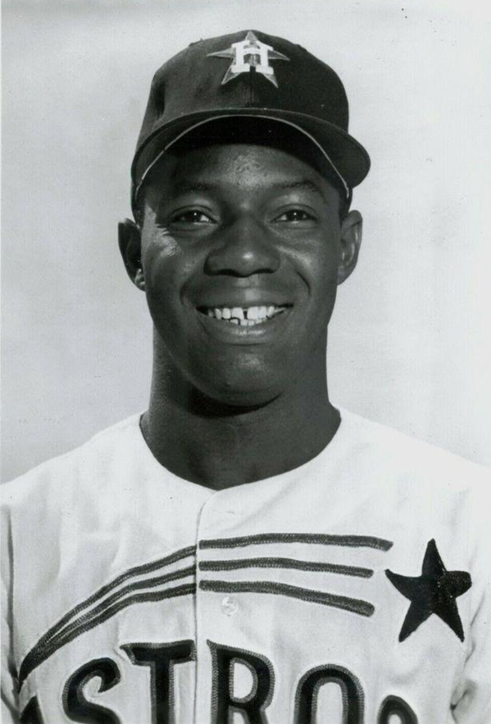
1968 Astros publicity photo of Jimmy Wynn.

During a pre-game ceremony on June 25, the club officially retired uniform number 24, donned by former outfielder Jimmy Wynn. Dubbed "The Toy Cannon," the 5 feet 9 inches (1.75 m) Wynn embodied the Colt.45s/Astros' original slugger, slamming 291 home runs during his 15-year career, including 223 with Houston—a franchise record that remained until Bagwell surpassed him in 1999. A native of the Cincinnati metropolitan area, Wynn signed out of high school with the Reds in 1962. Later that year, Houston selected him in the first-year player draft. Wynn began his major league career and spent 11 seasons with Houston from 1963 to 1973 prior to playing for Los Angeles, New York, Atlanta, and Milwaukee.

An excellent blend of power, speed, and patience, some of Wynn's distinctions included becoming the first Astros player to connect for three home runs in one game (June 15, 1967), the first to hit 30 home runs in a season (August 23, 1967), their first 40-stolen base bandit (43 in 1965), and, in 1969, a then-NL record tying 148 bases on balls fortified with an on-base streak of 52 games which tied for sixth in NL history. Following the 1973 campaign, Wynn departed Houston ranked among club leaders in hits (1,291), home runs and runs batted in (719 RBI).

==== Rest of June ====
Morgan Ensberg connected for a go-ahead grand slam on June 28 at Coors Field, placing starter Roger Clemens with a 5–1 lead, who tossed seven innings with four hits allowed and seven strikeouts. Craig Biggio collected three hits and a double (26), while Chris Burke also doubled (6) versus the Colorado Rockies. Ensberg also knocked a sacrifice fly during the first inning, tallying five RBI for the game. However, the Rockies rallied for five runs in the bottom of the eighth inning against the Astros' bullpen, to win in their final at bat, 6–5, and drop Houston's record to 34–41 (.453). The 5 RBI tied Ensberg's career high set the previous month on May 15.

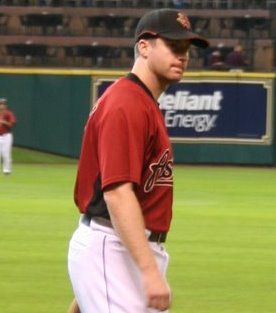
Third baseman Morgan Ensberg

On June 29, Biggio was hit by pitch for the 268th time, establishing a modern major league record.

The Astros rebounded to claim a 16–9 (.640) record during the month of June after combined result of 19–32 (.373) during April and May. As of June 30, they tied Milwaukee for third place in the NL Central division, 13 games behind St. Louis, holding a record of 49–29 (.628).

==== July, pre-All Star break ====
On July 1, forty-four-year-old southpaw John Franco made his final major league appearance after 21 seasons. Franco recorded two outs against the Cincinnati Reds, and surrendered three hits and three runs.

Over eight games for the week of June 27 to July 3, Morgan Ensberg hit ,387 / .444 / .935 / 1.380, 12 hits, nine runs, five doubles, four home runs, 12 RBI, and 29 total bases. The Astros went 5–2–1 (.688) He was thus recognized as National League (NL) Player of the Week.

==== MLB All-Star Game ====
For the second consecutive year, four Astros were selected to the MLB All-Star Game, hosted at Comerica Park in Detroit. The Astros' corps included pitchers Roger Clemens, Brad Lidge, and Roy Oswalt, and third baseman Morgan Ensberg. This was the sixth time that the Astros had sent at least four players to Midsummer Classic, succeeding the 1979, 1986 (at the Astrodome), 1994 (five players), 1999, and 2004 editions.

The American League defeated the NL squad, 7–5. All Astros selectees appeared in the contest. Oswalt was charged win two runs in his inning, prior to Clemens hurling a clean inning. Ensberg was substituted in at first base for Derrek Lee in the top of the seventh inning. Lidge, making his first All-Star appearance, entered in the bottom of the seventh, and struck out all three batters he faced. He tossed 11 total pitches, two of them balls, to Melvin Mora, Mike Sweeney, and Garret Anderson, and none of the three made contact with any of Lidge's offerings.

==== July, post All-Star break ====
On July 25, Craig Biggio (15) and Lance Berkman (11) combined for a franchise first by swatting back-to-back home runs twice in the same game. The duo homered consecutively in each of the first and third innings to spark a 7–1 victory over the Philadelphia Phillies. Jason Lane (15) also homered in the fifth inning, acounting for five off Phillies starter Cory Lidle. Astros starter Andy Pettitte (9–7) scattered seven hits and three walks and seven strikeouts to earn the victory.

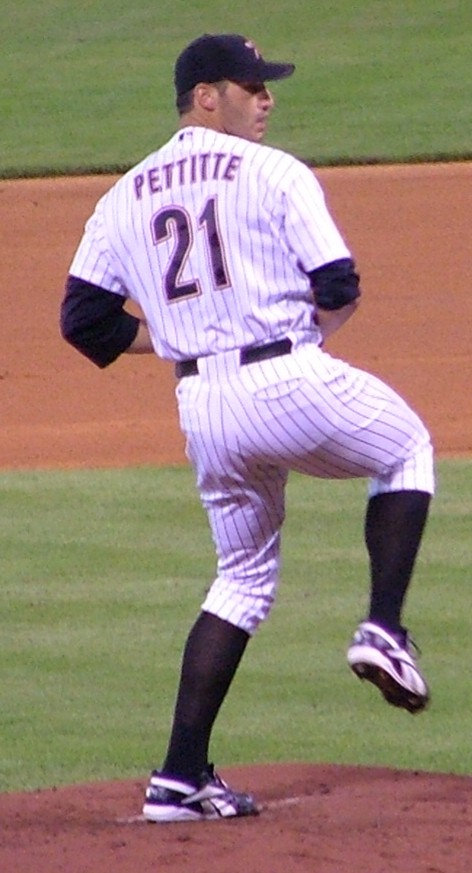
Starter Andy Pettitte on the mound at Minute Maid Park.

Two Astros hurlers claimed monthly awards for July. In six starts, southpaw Andy Pettitte posted a 5–0 win–loss record (W–L), and 0.40 earned run average (ERA)—just four runs yielded over 40 innings pitched. Pettitte surrendered two home runs, 10 walks, and a .585 on-base plus slugging against to 157 batters faced. Following this performance, Pettitte was selected for National League (NL) Pitcher of the Month honors. Pettitte succeeded rotation-mate Roger Clemens in April 2004 as the most recent Astros moundsman to be so recognized.

Over 11 appearances in July, Brad Lidge produced a 1–0 W–L, 1.64 earned run average (ERA), and eight saves. Over 11 innings pitched, Lidge surrendered four hits, one walk, one home run and struck out 15, with a 0.455 walks plus hits per inning pitched. He allowed a .111 batting average against (BAA) with a 40.54% strikeout percentage. Hence, Lidge was recognized as Delivery Man of the Month, the first monthly award of his career.

The Astros constructed a season-high seven game winning streak from July 24 to 30, to cap their best month of the season, at 22–7 (.759) in July. Led by Pettitte and Lidge, the pitching staff yielded a 2.48 ERA and 1.131 WHIP, while this winning percentage tied for third-highest in a month in team history with August 1998, trailing only May 1969 (.769) and September–October 2004 (.767). Their July 2005 performance would not be exceeded again until September 2019 (.760).

==== August ====
On August 15, Morgan Ensberg produced his fourth career four-hit game, also homering and driving in three runs, to lead a 12–4 win over the Chicago Cubs. Ensberg's 33rd home run of the season, Chris Burke (2), Adam Everett (9) and Humberto Quintero (1) all added home runs. Starter Wandy Rodríguez (8–5) worked seven innings to earn the victory, and collected a hit and scored.

==== September ====
On September 7, Craig Biggio hit his 20th home run of the season off former Astros closer Billy Wagner (4–3) in the top of the ninth inning, a three-run shot that decided an Astros 8–6 final, and sealed 6–0 sweep of the season series over the Philadelphia Phillies. In the ninth, the Astros' José Vizcaíno reached on a fielding error and Willy Taveras beat out an infield single to set up Biggio. Another former Astro Bobby Abreu hit a two-run home run in the eighth inning and a Shane Victorino RBI single temporarily gave the Phillies the lead against Dan Wheeler, but Chad Qualls (5–4) got the final two outs of the eighth before Brad Lidge locked down the bottom of the ninth for his 35th save. It was the Astros' 12th consecutive win over Philadelphia, allowing them to hold a one-game lead over the Florida Marlins in the NL Wild Card race.

Jeff Bagwell was reinstated from the disabled list on September 9 after having missed most of the season following shoulder surgery on June 7. Rendered unable to throw, he was limited to pinch hitting opportunities for the rest of the year. Were the Astros able to make the playoffs, he would be placed on the roster.

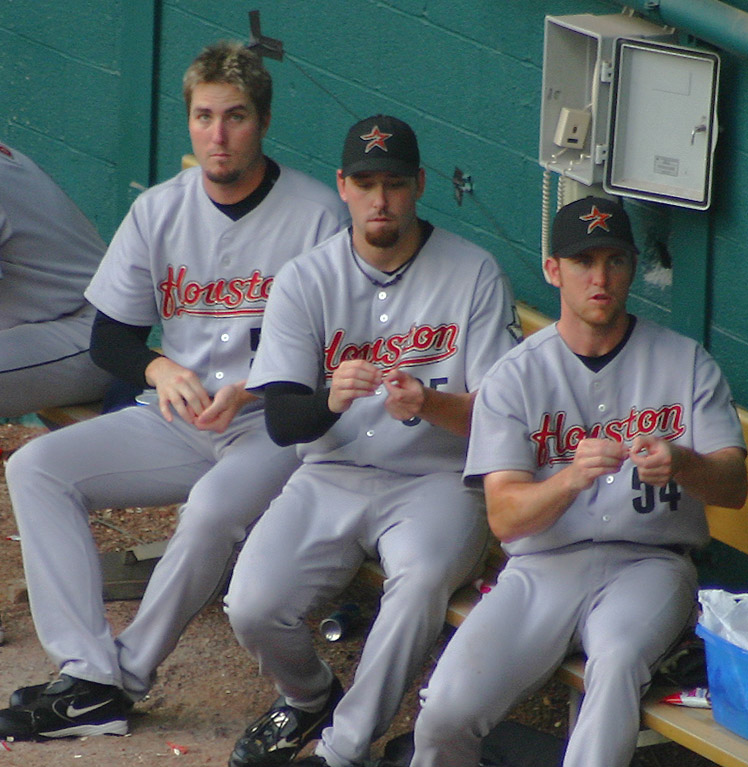
Relievers Chad Qualls, Dan Wheeler, and Brad Lidge in the bullpen.

Biggio attained yet another milestone on September 10, when he sliced a two-run double to right field during the second frame for his 600th career double. Hence, Biggio became the 13th major leaguer to attain as many as 600 doubles. The double scored Willy Taveras and Andy Pettitte, staking Houston to a 3–0 lead that they would not relinquish. Meanwhile, Pettitte (15–9) notched the victory via a quality start, while Brad Lidge picked up the final two outs to claim his 36th save in a 7–5 win over the Milwaukee Brewers. The win allowed the Astros to maintain a 1/2-game lead over the Florida Marlins in the Wild Card race. Moreover, Biggio became the first major leaguer to, in addition, have combined 2700 hits, 250 home runs and 400 stolen bases. Three more safeties yielded 2,777 total to overtake Andre Dawson for 43rd place all-time.

On September 14, Charlton Jimerson made his major league debut versus the Florida Marlins, while Roger Clemens was victorious in an emotional start following the death of his mother that morning. Jimerson entered as a ninth inning defensive substitution in center field, replacing Lance Berkman, and did not receive a plate appearance in a 10-to-2 Astros win. Clemens (12–7) allowed one run over 6 1/3 frames, while Mike Lamb tripled (5) among three hits, and Adam Everett collected two hits and three RBI (53). The victory placed Houston 1/2 game behind Florida—who dropped into a tie with the Philadelphia Phillies (78–68 each)—for the Wild Card position.

Closer Brad Lidge converted his 23rd consecutive save on September 27, breaking a club record, and this streak spanned to 24 chaces in succession. The scintilla had started June 21, surpassing former bullpen-mate Wagner (22 straight saves from July 8–September 24, 2003). Lidge's feat remained the franchise longest until Roberto Osuna converted 25 consecutive from August 22, 2018, to May 24, 2019. (Note: Longest streak of consecutive games, playing for HOU, in the regular season, requiring saves ≥ 1, sorted by most games matching criteria.) It was Lidge's 40th save of the season. also joining Wagner in 2003 as the second pitcher to achieve 40 saves in one season for the Astros.

==== Rogers Clemens' 4,500th strikeout ====
During his final regular-season start, on October 1, Roger Clemens procured the 4,500th whiff of his career. Biggio hit his career-high 26th home run, and the Astros' 3–1 victory over the Cubs clinched the NL Wild Card title. To close out the bottom of the first inning, Clemens fanned Jeromy Burnitz swinging for his first of the contes. In the top of the third, Clemens got another swinging strikeout of his mound opponent, Jerome Williams. Clemens also retired the next batter, José Macías, with a swinging strikeout for the milestone. On the day, Clemens fanned five. Clenens became the second hurler to reach 4,500 strikeouts, following Nolan Ryan. (Note: Also a member of the Astros at the time of this milestone strikeout, Ryan achieved his on September 9, 1987.)

Lidge saved the final two games of the season, both against the Cubs on October 1 and 2, to conclude with 42.

Andy Pettitte, who produced an 11–2 record, 1.69 ERA, and 0.904 WHIP over 16 starts and 111 2/3 innings over the second half of the season, concluded with a 4–0 record, 1.86 ERA, and 7.25 strikeout-to-walk ratio in 6 starts for September to October. For the second time in three months, Pettitte was recognized as NL Pitcher of the Month. Thus, Pettitte became the second Astro to win Pitcher of the Month twice during the same season, joining Randy Johnson in 1998. Besides Johnson, Pettitte became the fifth hurler to win Pitcher of the Month honors more than once with the Astros, joining J. R. Richard (thrice), Nolan Ryan, and Darryl Kile (twice each).

==== Performance overview ====
After having started the season with a 15–30 won–loss record, the Astros reversed the momentum to post a 74–43 (.632) record over their final 117 games and capture the NL Wild Card title, the best record in the major leagues over that span. The last instance any team had been mired as much as 15 games under .500 and came back to qualify for the postseason that same year transpired more than 90 years earlier as the 1914 Boston Braves, also known as the "Miracle Braves," and that campaign's World Series champions.

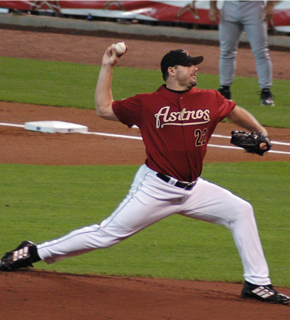
Roger Clemens on the mound at Minute Maid Park in 2005.

With a regular-season conclusion that largely resembled 2004, Houston produced an 89–73 showing, while capturing their second-successive National League Wild Card title. First, Houston wound up second to another NL Central division champion St. Louis Cardinals powerhouse who had claimed upward of 100 wins, 11 games ahead of Houston. Moreover, the Astros finished just one game ahead in the Wild Card race, this time outlasting the Philadelphia Phillies. Hence, the club actualized the third era in franchise history featuring sequential playoff entrances, succeeding the 1980, 1981, 1997, 1998, 1999, and 2004 squads.

For the eighth time in franchise history, Houston reached the 89-win threshold, while qualifying for their ninth playoff appearance, the second via the Wild Card position. Starting in 2001, it was the Astros' fifth successive campaign reaching 84 or more wins, a franchise record. Since the inception of the NL Central division in 1994, Houston had concluded the regular season in either first or second place eleven times in 12 seasons, excluding the 2000 campaign. Furthermore, during a span of 17 seasons commencing in 1992, the 2005 campaign signified the thirteenth of 15 having completed with a .500 winning percentage or above.

As such, manager Phil Garner joined Bill Virdon, Hal Lanier, and Larry Dierker as those who distinguished themselves by guiding Astros clubs to the playoffs.

Jeff Bagwell, Craig Biggio, and executive Tal Smith each received Baseball Americas Lifetime Achievement Award following the 2005 season.

Roger Clemens won the NL earned run average title (1.87 ERA)—also leading the major leagues—for the lowest in the league since Greg Maddux (1.63) in 1995. Clemens became the first Astros hurler to lead the league since Danny Darwin in 1990 (2.21), the fifth Astro and sixth time overall in franchise history. Clemens was preceded by J. R. Richard (2.71 in 1979), Nolan Ryan (twice, 1.69 in 1981, and 2.76 in 1987), and Mike Scott (2.22 in 1986). Clemens led the major leagues in hits per nine innings (6.431 H/9), the first Astro to lead the league since Pete Harnisch in 1993. This was the 12th occasion an Astro hurler had individually led the league in this category.

Meanwhile, Andy Pettitte ranked second in the NL in ERA (2.39), which also ranked third in club history among left-handed pitchers, trailing only Bob Knepper (2.18 in 1981) and Mike Cuellar (2.22 in 1966). (Note: For single seasons, throws LH, qualified for league ERA title, playing for HOU, in the regular season, sorted by ascending earned run average.)

Roy Oswalt, having won 20 games, repeated this feat in consecutive seasons, the first Astro to do so since Joe Niekro in 1979 (21) and 1980 (20).

As it was his sixth consecutive season having reached the 20-home run threshold, Lance Berkman tied Glenn Davis (1990) for the second-longest streak of this category in club annals.

Third baseman Morgan Ensberg was honored with his first career Silver Slugger Award, also becoming the first player in club history to win the award at his position. Ensberg became the first Astro to win the award win since Bagwell and Mike Hampton in 1999. Ensberg was also selected to The Sporting News NL All-Star Team.

Willy Taveras was selected as the Players Choice Award winner for NL Outstanding Rookie, the first Houston Asto selected for this award. He also won The Sporting News (TSN) NL Rookie of the Year to become the eighth Astro to win TSN Rookie of the Year Award, and first since Oswalt in 2001,

=== League standings ===
==== National League Central ====
NL Central
Team	W	L	Pct.	GB	Home	Road
St. Louis Cardinals	100	62	.617	—	50‍–‍31	50‍–‍31
Houston Astros	89	73	.549	11	53‍–‍28	36‍–‍45
Milwaukee Brewers	81	81	.500	19	46‍–‍35	35‍–‍46
Chicago Cubs	79	83	.488	21	38‍–‍43	41‍–‍40
Cincinnati Reds	73	89	.451	27	42‍–‍39	31‍–‍50
Pittsburgh Pirates	67	95	.414	33	34‍–‍47	33‍–‍48

==== Record versus opponents ====
National League

2005 National League record Source: MLB Standings Grid – 2005
Team	AZ	ATL	CHC	CIN	COL	FLA	HOU	LAD	MIL	NYM	PHI	PIT	SD	SF	STL	WAS	AL
Arizona	—	3–3	5–2	2–4	11–7	2–4	3–3	13–5	2–4	1–6	3–4	3–4	10–9	7–11	2–5	2–4	8–10
Atlanta	3–3	—	6–1	7–3	2–4	10–8	5–1	3–3	3–3	13–6	9–10	4–3	1–5	4–2	3–3	10–9	7–8
Chicago	2–5	1–6	—	6–9	4–3	5–4	9–7	4–2	7–9	2–4	2–4	11–5	4–3	5–2	10–6	1–5	6–9
Cincinnati	4–2	3–7	9–6	—	3–3	2–4	4–12	3–4	6–10	3–3	3–4	9–7	4–2	3–5	5–11	5–1	7-8
Colorado	7–11	4–2	3–4	3–3	—	3–3	1–5	11–8	1–5	3–4	2–4	3–7	7–11	7–11	4–4	2–4	6–9
Florida	4–2	8–10	4–5	4–2	3–3	—	4–3	5–2	3–4	8–10	9–10	3–4	2–4	4–2	3–4	9–9	10–5
Houston	3–3	1–5	7–9	12–4	5–1	3-4	—	4–2	10–5	5–5	6–0	9–7	4–3	3–4	5–11	5–2	7–8
Los Angeles	5–13	3–3	2–4	4–3	8–11	2–5	2–4	—	5–1	3–3	3–3	5–2	11–7	9–10	2–5	2–4	5–13
Milwaukee	4–2	3–3	9–7	10–6	5–1	4–3	5–10	1–5	—	3–3	4–5	9–7	3–4	4–3	5–11	4–4	8–7
New York	6–1	6–13	4–2	3–3	4–3	10–8	5–5	3–3	3–3	—	11–7	3–3	4–2	3–3	2–5	11–8	5–10
Philadelphia	4-3	10–9	4–2	4–3	4–2	10–9	0–6	3–3	5–4	7–11	—	4–3	6–0	5–1	4–2	11–8	7–8
Pittsburgh	4–3	3–4	5–11	7–9	7–3	4–3	7–9	2–5	7–9	3–3	3–4	—	3–4	2–4	4–12	1–5	5–7
San Diego	9–10	5–1	3–4	2–4	11–7	4–2	3–4	7–11	4–3	2–4	0–6	4–3	—	12–6	4–3	5–1	7–11
San Francisco	11–7	2–4	2–5	5–3	11–7	2–4	4–3	10–9	3–4	3–3	1–5	4–2	6–12	—	2–4	3–3	6–12
St. Louis	5–2	3–3	6–10	11–5	4–4	4-3	11–5	5–2	11–5	5–2	2–4	12–4	3–4	4–2	—	4–2	10–5
Washington	4–2	9–10	5–1	1–5	4–2	9-9	2–5	4–2	4–4	8–11	8–11	5–1	1–5	3–3	2–4	—	12–6

=== Lone Star series ===
Known as the Lone Star Series, the annual interleague games between the Houston Astros and the Texas Rangers were played in June and July.

Date	Winning team	Score	Winning pitcher	Losing pitcher	Attendance	Location
May 20	Texas	7–3	Kenny Rogers	Brandon Backe	38,109	Arlington
May 21	Texas	18–3	Chris Young	Ezequiel Astacio	35,781	Arlington
May 22	Texas	2–0	Chan Ho Park	Roy Oswalt	40,583	Arlington
June 24	Houston	5–2	Roy Oswalt	Ricardo Rodríguez	36,199	Houston
June 25	Texas	6–5	Chris Young	Brandon Backe	41,868	Houston
June 26	Houston	3–2	Chad Qualls	Juan Dominguez	35,331	Houston

†	Game during which winning team clinched season series

=== Bating orders ===
No.	Most common (18×)	Most appearances
1	Taveras	Taveras (119)
2	Biggio	Biggio (100)
3	Berkman	Berkman (63)
4	Ensberg	Ensberg (73) • Berkman (69)
5	Lane	Lane (84)
6	Everett	Lane (41) • Everett (36)
7	Burke	Everett (88)
8	Ausmus	Ausmus (102)
9	Pitcher	Oswalt (33) • Pettitte (32) • Clemens (31)

=== Transactions ===
- April 9, 2005: Brooks Kieschnick was signed as a free agent with the Houston Astros.
- April 27, 2005: Trenidad Hubbard was released by the Houston Astros.

== Roster ==
2005 Houston Astros
Roster
Pitchers: 38 Ezequiel Astacio; 41 Brandon Backe; 53 Mike Burns; 22 Roger Clemens; 58 Travis Driskill; 56 Brandon Duckworth; 31 John Franco; 45 Mike Gallo; 43 Chad Harville; 54 Brad Lidge; 44 Roy Oswalt; 21 Andy Pettitte; 50 Chad Qualls; 51 Wandy Rodríguez; 36 Russ Springer; 43 Scott Strickland; 35 Dan Wheeler	Catchers: 11 Brad Ausmus; 46 Raúl Chávez; 9 Humberto Quintero; Infielders: 5 Jeff Bagwell; 17 Lance Berkman; 7 Craig Biggio; 4 Eric Bruntlett; 14 Morgan Ensberg; 28 Adam Everett; 26 Mike Lamb; 10 José Vizcaíno	Outfielders: 2 Chris Burke; 31 Charles Gipson; 52 Charlton Jimerson; 24,16 Jason Lane; 19 Orlando Palmeiro; 30 Luke Scott; 37 Todd Self; 1 Willy Taveras	Manager: 3 Phil Garner; Coaches: 6 Mark Bailey (bullpen); 15 Cecil Cooper (bench); 25 José Cruz (first base); 8 Gary Gaetti (hitting); 48 Jim Hickey (pitching); 29 Doug Mansolino (third base)

== Player statistics ==
Table legend
League leader (Bold: MLB leader)
League top ten
Team leader

=== Batting ===
Abbreviations

- G — Games played
- AB — At bats
- R — Runs
- H — Hits
- 2B — Doubles
- 3B — Triples
- HR — Home runs
- RBI — Runs batted in
- SB — Stolen bases
- BB — Walks
- AVG — Batting average
- OBP — On-base percentage
- SLG — Slugging percentage
- OPS — On-base plus slugging

Regular season results
Player	G	AB	R	H	2B	3B	HR	RBI	SB	BB	AVG	OBP	SLG	OPS
Willy Taveras	152	592	82	172	13	4	3	29	34	25	.291	.325	.341	.666
Craig Biggio	155	590	94	156	40	1	26	69	11	37	.264	.325	.468	.792
Adam Everett	152	549	58	136	27	2	11	54	21	26	.248	.290	.364	.654
Morgan Ensberg	150	526	86	149	30	3	36	101	6	85	.283	.388	.557	.945
Jason Lane	145	517	65	138	34	4	26	78	6	32	.267	.316	.499	.815
Lance Berkman	132	468	76	137	34	1	24	82	4	91	.293	.411	.524	.934
Brad Ausmus	134	387	35	100	19	0	3	47	5	51	.258	.351	.331	.682
Mike Lamb	125	322	41	76	13	5	12	53	1	22	.236	.284	.419	.703
Chris Burke	108	318	49	79	19	2	5	26	11	23	.248	.309	.368	.676
Orlando Palmeiro	114	204	22	58	17	2	3	20	3	15	.284	.341	.431	.772
José Vizcaíno	98	187	15	46	10	2	1	23	2	15	.246	.299	.337	.636
Eric Bruntlett	91	109	19	24	5	2	4	14	7	10	.220	.292	.413	.705
Jeff Bagwell	39	100	11	25	4	0	3	19	0	18	.250	.358	.380	.738
Raúl Chávez	37	99	6	17	3	0	2	6	1	4	.172	.210	.263	.472
Luke Scott	34	80	6	15	4	2	0	4	1	9	.188	.270	.288	.557
Humberto Quintero	18	54	6	10	1	0	1	8	0	1	.185	.200	.259	.459
Todd Self	21	45	7	9	2	0	1	4	0	3	.200	.250	.311	.561
Charles Gipson	19	11	2	2	1	0	0	1	1	1	.182	.250	.273	.562
Charlton Jimerson	1	0	0	0	0	0	0	0	0	0				
Pitcher totals	163	304	13	51	5	2	0	16	1	13	.168	.206	.197	.404
**Team totals**	**163**	**5462**	**693**	**1400**	**281**	**32**	**161**	**654**	**115**	**481**	**.256**	**.322**	**.408**	**.730**

=== Pitching ===
Abbreviations key

- W — wins
- L — losses
- ERA — earned run average
- G — games pitched
- GS — games started
- SV — saves
- IP — innings pitched
- H — hits allowed
- R — runs allowed
- ER — earned runs allowed
- BB — base on balls allowed
- SO — strikeouts
- WHIP — walks plus hits per inning pitched

Regular season results
Player	W	L	ERA	G	GS	SV	IP	H	R	ER	BB	SO
Roy Oswalt	20	12	2.94	35	**35**	0	241.2	243	85	79	48	184
Andy Pettitte	17	9	2.39	33	33	0	222.1	188	66	59	41	171
Roger Clemens	13	8	**1.87**	32	32	0	211.1	151	51	44	62	185
Brandon Backe	10	8	4.76	26	25	0	149.1	151	82	79	67	97
Wandy Rodríguez	10	10	5.53	25	22	0	128.2	135	82	79	53	80
Ezequiel Astacio	3	6	5.67	22	14	0	81.0	100	56	51	25	66
Chad Qualls	6	4	3.28	77	0	0	79.2	73	33	29	23	60
Dan Wheeler	2	3	2.21	71	0	3	73.1	53	18	18	19	69
Brad Lidge	4	4	2.29	70	0	42	70.2	58	21	18	23	103
Russ Springer	4	4	4.73	62	0	0	59.0	49	34	31	21	54
Chad Harville	0	2	4.46	37	0	0	38.1	36	21	19	24	33
Mike Burns	0	0	4.94	27	0	0	31.0	29	18	17	8	20
Mike Gallo	0	1	2.66	36	0	0	20.1	18	6	6	10	12
Brandon Duckworth	0	1	11.02	7	2	0	16.1	24	20	20	7	10
John Franco	0	1	7.20	31	0	0	15.0	23	13	12	9	16
Scott Strickland	0	0	6.75	5	0	0	4.0	4	3	3	0	2
Travis Driskill	0	0	0.00	1	0	0	1.0	1	0	0	0	2
**Team totals**	**89**	**73**	**3.51**	**163**	**163**	**45**	**1443.0**	**1336**	**609**	**563**	**440**	**1164**
Other: Complete games—Oswalt (4), Backe (1), Clemens (1) • Shutouts—Backe (1), Oswalt (1) • Source:

== Game log ==
=== Regular season ===
Legend
Astros Win	Astros Loss	Game postponed

2005 Regular Season Game Log: 89–73 (Home: 53–28; Away: 36–45)
April: 9–13 (Home: 8–3; Away: 1–10)

#	Date	Opponent	Score	Win	Loss	Save	Stadium	Attendance	Record	Report
1	April 5	Cardinals	3–7	Carpenter (1–0)	Oswalt (0–1)	Isringhausen (1)	Minute Maid Park	43,567	0–1	L1
2	April 6	Cardinals	4–1	Qualls (1–0)	Tavárez (0–1)	Lidge (1)	Minute Maid Park	28,496	1–1	W1
3	April 8	Reds	3–2	Clemens (1–0)	Belisle (0–1)	Lidge (2)	Minute Maid Park	36,328	2–1	W2
4	April 9	Reds	4–3	Lidge (1–0)	Wagner (0–1)	—	Minute Maid Park	34,502	3–1	W3
5	April 10	Reds	5–2	Oswalt (1–1)	Milton (1–1)	Lidge (3)	Minute Maid Park	31,832	4–1	W4
6	April 11	@ Mets	4–8	Hernández (1–0)	Springer (0–1)	—	Shea Stadium	53,663	4–2	L1
7	April 13	@ Mets	0–1 (11)	DeJean (1–0)	Wheeler (0–1)	—	Shea Stadium	22,431	4–3	L2
8	April 14	@ Mets	3–4	Matthews (1–0)	Franco (0–1)	Looper (1)	Shea Stadium	17,214	4–4	L3
9	April 15	@ Reds	11–2	Oswalt (2–1)	Wilson (0–1)	—	Great American Ball Park	31,740	5–4	W1
10	April 16	@ Reds	2–3	Milton (2–1)	Pettitte (0–1)	Graves (3)	Great American Ball Park	26,926	5–5	L1
11	April 17	@ Reds	5–6	Wagner (1–1)	Qualls (1–1)	Graves (4)	Great American Ball Park	25,762	5–6	L2
12	April 18	Braves	0–1 (12)	Sosa (1–0)	Wheeler (0–2)	Kolb (4)	Minute Maid Park	31,672	5–7	L3
13	April 19	Braves	5–3	Backe (1–0)	Thomson (1–2)	Lidge (4)	Minute Maid Park	32,146	6–7	W1
14	April 20	Brewers	6–1	Oswalt (3–1)	Sheets (1–3)	—	Minute Maid Park	26,119	7–7	W2
15	April 21	Brewers	8–7	Pettitte (1–1)	Davis (2–2)	Lidge (5)	Minute Maid Park	32,173	8–7	W3
16	April 22	@ Cardinals	7–8	Marquis (3–0)	Duckworth (0–1)	Isringhausen (6)	Busch Memorial Stadium	44,805	8–8	L1
17	April 23	@ Cardinals	0–1 (10)	Mulder (2–1)	Qualls (1–2)	—	Busch Memorial Stadium	40,058	8–9	L2
18	April 24	@ Cardinals	5–8	Morris (2–0	Backe (1–1)	Isringhausen (7)	Busch Memorial Stadium	39,020	8–10	L3
19	April 25	@ Pirates	0–2	Pérez (1–2)	Oswalt (3–2)	Mesa (7)	PNC Park	8,413	8–11	L4
—	April 26	@ Pirates	Postponed (rain); Rescheduled to July 19							
20	April 27	@ Pirates	0–2	Wells (2–3)	Pettitte (1–2)	Mesa (8)	PNC Park	13,426	8–12	L5
21	April 29	Cubs	2–3	Maddux (1–1)	Clemens (1–1)	Hawkins (4)	Minute Maid Park	41,232	8–13	L6
22	April 30	Cubs	7–5	Backe (2–1)	Bartosh (0–1)	—	Minute Maid Park	41,615	9–13	W1

May 10–19 (Home: 6–7; Away: 4–12)

#	Date	Opponent	Score	Win	Loss	Save	Stadium	Attendance	Record	Report
23	May 1	Cubs	9–3	Oswalt (4–2)	Prior (3–1)	—	Minute Maid Park	38,014	10–13	W2
24	May 2	Pirates	11–4	Pettitte (2–2)	Fogg (1–2)	—	Minute Maid Park	23,882	11–13	W3
25	May 3	Pirates	4–7	White (1–2)	Qualls (1–3)	Mesa (9)	Minute Maid Park	27,809	11–14	L1
26	May 4	Pirates	4–6	Torres (2–1)	Lidge (1–1)	Mesa (10)	Minute Maid Park	29,299	11–15	L2
27	May 5	@ Braves	3–9	Thomson (3–2)	Backe (2–2)	—	Turner Field	20,553	11–16	L3
28	May 6	@ Braves	4–9	Smoltz (3–3)	Oswalt (4–3)	—	Turner Field	26,987	11–17	L4
29	May 7	@ Braves	1–4	Ramírez (2–2)	Pettitte (2–3)	Kolb (9)	Turner Field	36,452	11–18	L5
30	May 8	@ Braves	0–16	Hampton (4–1)	Astacio (0–1)	—	Turner Field	32,498	11–19	L6
31	May 9	@ Marlins	2–1	Clemens (2–1)	Burnett (3–3)	Lidge (6)	Dolphin Stadium	20,539	12–19	W1
32	May 10	@ Marlins	2–6	Mecir (1–0)	Springer (0–2)	—	Dolphin Stadium	11,687	12–20	L1
33	May 11	@ Marlins	1–2	Willis (7–0)	Oswalt (4–4)	Jones (3)	Dolphin Stadium	21,789	12–21	L2
34	May 12	Giants	3–6	Hennessey (2–0)	Pettitte (2–4)	Walker (2)	Minute Maid Park	29,126	12–22	L3
35	May 13	Giants	2–4	Rueter (2–2)	Astacio (0–2)	Walker (3)	Minute Maid Park	31,365	12–23	L4
36	May 14	Giants	4–1	Clemens (3–1)	Tomko (3–5)	Lidge (7)	Minute Maid Park	41,323	13–23	W1
37	May 15	Giants	9–0	Backe (3–2)	Fassero (0–1)	—	Minute Maid Park	33,633	14–23	W2
38	May 17	Diamondbacks	3–0	Oswalt (5–4)	Vázquez (4–3)	Lidge (8)	Minute Maid Park	27,156	15–23	W3
39	May 18	Diamondbacks	6–7	Ortiz (4–2)	Pettitte (2–5)	Bruney (3)	Minute Maid Park	27,790	15–24	L1
40	May 19	Diamondbacks	1–6	Halsey (3–2)	Clemens (3–2)	Valverde (1)	Minute Maid Park	32,132	15–25	L2
41	May 20	@ Rangers	3–7	Rogers (5–2)	Backe (3–3)	—	Ameriquest Field in Arlington	38,109	15–26	L3
42	May 21	@ Rangers	3–18	Young (4–2)	Astacio (0–3)	—	Ameriquest Field in Arlington	35,781	15–27	L4
43	May 22	@ Rangers	0–2	Park (4–1)	Oswalt (5–5)	Cordero (14)	Ameriquest Field in Arlington	40,583	15–28	L5
44	May 23	@ Cubs	1–4	Rusch (3–1)	Rodríguez (0–1)	Dempster (3)	Wrigley Field	38,232	15–29	L6
45	May 24	@ Cubs	2–4	Wuertz (3–2)	Lidge (1–2)	Dempster (4)	Wrigley Field	38,805	15–30	L7
46	May 25	@ Cubs	5–1	Backe (4–3)	Maddux (2–3)	—	Wrigley Field	38,118	16–30	W1
47	May 27	@ Brewers	0–3	Davis (6–5)	Oswalt (5–6)	Turnbow (7)	Miller Park	22,173	16–31	L1
48	May 28	@ Brewers	9–6	Rodríguez (1–1)	Sheets (1–4)	Lidge (9)	Miller Park	37,845	17–31	W1
49	May 29	@ Brewers	2–1	Pettitte (3–5)	Capuano (4–4)	Lidge (10)	Miller Park	34,402	18–31	W2
50	May 30	Reds	0–9	Harang (4–2)	Clemens (3–3)	—	Minute Maid Park	42,097	18–32	L1
51	May 31	Reds	4–3	Backe (5–3)	Belisle (2–5)	Lidge (11)	Minute Maid Park	28,535	19–32	W1

June: 16–9 (Home: 10–3; Away: 6–6)

#	Date	Opponent	Score	Win	Loss	Save	Stadium	Attendance	Record	Report
52	June 1	Reds	4–1	Oswalt (6–6)	Ortiz (1–4)	Lidge (12)	Minute Maid Park	31,571	20–32	W2
53	June 3	Cardinals	0–2	Carpenter (8–3)	Pettitte (3–6)	Tavárez (3)	Minute Maid Park	34,092	20–33	L1
54	June 4	Cardinals	9–11	Marquis (7–3)	Rodríguez (1–2)	Isringhausen (17)	Minute Maid Park	39,288	20–34	L2
55	June 5	Cardinals	6–4	Clemens (4–3)	Mulder (7–3)	Lidge (13)	Minute Maid Park	34,009	21–34	W1
56	June 7	@ Mets	1–3	Martínez (7–1)	Oswalt (6–7)	—	Shea Stadium	39,953	21–35	L1
57	June 8	@ Mets	4–1	Backe (6–3)	Zambrano (3–6)	Lidge (14)	Shea Stadium	23,635	22–35	W1
58	June 9	@ Mets	6–3 (11)	Springer (1–2)	Bell (0–3)	Lidge (15)	Shea Stadium	30,737	23–35	W2
59	June 10	Blue Jays	4–2	Rodríguez (2–2)	Lilly (3–7)	Lidge (16)	Minute Maid Park	28,607	24–35	W3
60	June 11	Blue Jays	6–3	Lidge (2–2)	Schoeneweis (2–2)	—	Minute Maid Park	34,925	25–35	W4
61	June 12	Blue Jays	3–0	Oswalt (7–7)	Towers (5–5)	—	Minute Maid Park	30,584	26–35	W5
62	June 13	@ Orioles	5–8	Penn (1–0)	Backe (6–4)	Ryan (17)	Camden Yards	23,297	26–36	L1
63	June 14	@ Orioles	1–6	Chen (6–4)	Pettitte (3–7)	—	Camden Yards	24,659	26–37	L2
64	June 15	@ Orioles	1–5	López (6–4)	Rodríguez (2–3)	—	Camden Yards	31,547	26–38	L3
65	June 17	@ Royals	7–0	Clemens (5–3)	Howell (1–1)	—	Kauffman Stadium	27,385	27–38	W1
66	June 18	@ Royals	6–2	Oswalt (8–7)	Carrasco (2–2)	—	Kauffman Stadium	26,523	28–38	W2
67	June 19	@ Royals	1–7	Hernández (5–7)	Backe (6–5)	—	Kauffman Stadium	20,214	28–39	L1
68	June 20	Rockies	7–0	Pettitte (4–7)	Kennedy (3–7)	—	Minute Maid Park	28,237	29–39	W1
69	June 21	Rockies	6–5	Qualls (2–3)	Wright (4–7	Lidge (17)	Minute Maid Park	28,788	30–39	W2
70	June 22	Rockies	6–2	Clemens (6–3)	Jennings (4–8)	—	Minute Maid Park	39,415	31–39	W3
71	June 24	Rangers	5–2	Oswalt (9–7)	Rodríguez (2–1)	Lidge (18)	Minute Maid Park	36,199	32–39	W4
72	June 25	Rangers	5–6	Young (7–4)	Backe (6–6)	Cordero (18)	Minute Maid Park	41,868	32–40	L1
73	June 26	Rangers	3–2 (10)	Qualls (3–3)	Dominguez (0–2)	—	Minute Maid Park	35,331	33–40	W1
74	June 27	@ Rockies	11–5	Rodríguez (3–3)	Wright (4–8)	—	Coors Field	21,877	34–40	W2
75	June 28	@ Rockies	5–6	Cortés (1–0	Springer (1–3)	Fuentes (9)	Coors Field	28,726	34–41	L1
76	June 29	@ Rockies	7–1	Oswalt (10–7)	Kim (2–7)	—	Coors Field	23,494	35–41	W1
77	June 30	@ Reds	2–2	—	—	—	Great American Ball Park	19,903	35–41	—

July: 22–7 (Home: 12–2; Away: 10–5)

#	Date	Opponent	Score	Win	Loss	Save	Stadium	Attendance	Record	Report
78	July 1	@ Reds	10–7	Pettitte (5–7)	Hudson (1–3)	Wheeler (1)	Great American Ball Park	24,923	36–41	W2
79	July 2 (1)	@ Reds	4–3	Rodríguez (4–3)	Harang (4–7)	Wheeler (2)	Great American Ball Park	see 2nd game	37–41	W3
80	July 2 (2)	@ Reds	6–11	Ortiz (4–6)	Astacio (0–4)	—	Great American Ball Park	28,236	37–42	L1
81	July 3	@ Reds	9–0	Clemens (7–3)	Claussen (4–6)	—	Great American Ball Park	27,506	38–42	W1
82	July 4	Padres	4–1	Oswalt (11–7)	Lawrence (5–7)	—	Minute Maid Park	40,550	39–42	W2
83	July 5	Padres	6–2	Backe (7–6)	Reyes (3–2)	—	Minute Maid Park	27,307	40–42	W3
84	July 6	Padres	5–4	Pettitte (6–7)	Peavy (7–3)	Wheeler (3)	Minute Maid Park	29,774	41–42	W4
85	July 7	Padres	5–7	Williams (5–5)	Rodríguez (4–4)	Hoffman (24)	Minute Maid Park	28,810	41–43	L1
86	July 8	Dodgers	3–2	Lidge (3–2)	Brazobán (2–3)	—	Minute Maid Park	36,176	42–43	W1
87	July 9	Dodgers	4–2	Oswalt (12–7)	Weaver (7–8)	Lidge (19)	Minute Maid Park	37,196	43–43	W2
88	July 10	Dodgers	6–5	Springer (2–3)	Sánchez (2–4)	Lidge (20)	Minute Maid Park	39,177	44–43	W3
76th All-Star Game in Detroit, Michigan
89	July 15	@ Cardinals	3–4 (13)	Thompson (1–0)	Harville (0–1)	—	Busch Memorial Stadium	48,420	44–44	L1
90	July 16	@ Cardinals	2–4	Marquis (9–6)	Oswalt (12–8)	Isringhausen (26)	Busch Memorial Stadium	48,034	44–45	L2
91	July 17	@ Cardinals	0–3	Carpenter (14–4)	Clemens (7–4)	—	Busch Memorial Stadium	46,584	44–46	L3
92	July 18	@ Pirates	11–1	Backe (8–6)	Williams (7–7)	—	PNC Park	17,590	45–46	W1
93	July 19 (1)	@ Pirates	9–3	Astacio (1–4)	Snell (0–1)	—	PNC Park	see 2nd game	46–46	W2
94	July 19 (2)	@ Pirates	6–4	Rodríguez (5–4)	Redman (4–10)	Lidge (21)	PNC Park	20,552	47–46	W3
95	July 20	@ Pirates	8–0	Pettitte (7–7)	Fogg (4–6)	—	PNC Park	19,769	48–46	W4
96	July 21	@ Nationals	3–2	Oswalt (13–8)	Loaiza (6–6)	Lidge (22)	Robert F. Kennedy Memorial Stadium	36,840	49–46	W5
97	July 22	@ Nationals	14–1	Clemens (8–4)	Drese (7–9)	—	Robert F. Kennedy Memorial Stadium	38,019	50–46	W6
98	July 23	@ Nationals	2–4	Armas Jr. (5–4)	Backe (8–7)	Cordero (34)	Robert F. Kennedy Memorial Stadium	42,680	50–47	L1
99	July 24	@ Nationals	4–1 (14)	Springer (3–3)	Carrasco (3–3)	Lidge (23)	Robert F. Kennedy Memorial Stadium	39,203	51–47	W1
100	July 25	Phillies	7–1	Pettitte (8–7)	Lidle (8–9)	—	Minute Maid Park	36,029	52–47	W2
101	July 26	Phillies	2–1	Oswalt (14–8)	Madson (4–4)	—	Minute Maid Park	33,867	53–47	W3
102	July 27	Phillies	3–2	Clemens (9–4)	Padilla (5–9)	Lidge (24)	Minute Maid Park	38,071	54–47	W4
103	July 28	Mets	3–2	Wheeler (1–2)	Hernández (1–0)	—	Minute Maid Park	43,552	55–47	W5
104	July 29	Mets	5–2	Rodríguez (6–4)	Benson (7–4)	Lidge (25)	Minute Maid Park	42,659	56–47	W6
105	July 30	Mets	2–0	Pettitte (9–7)	Glavine (7–9)	Lidge (26)	Minute Maid Park	43,596	57–47	W7
106	July 31	Mets	4–9	Heilman (4–3)	Wheeler (1–3)	—	Minute Maid Park	43,028	57–48	L1

August: 13–14 (Home: 8–7; Away: 5–7)

#	Date	Opponent	Score	Win	Loss	Save	Stadium	Attendance	Record	Report
107	August 2	@ Diamondbacks	3–1	Clemens (10–4)	Vargas (4–6)	Lidge (27)	Bank One Ballpark	31,696	58–48	W1
108	August 3	@ Diamondbacks	7–0	Astacio (2–4)	Vázquez (9–10)	—	Bank One Ballpark	22,283	59–48	W2
109	August 4	@ Diamondbacks	3–7	Halsey (8–7)	Rodríguez (6–5)	Valverde (3)	Bank One Ballpark	23,217	59–49	L1
110	August 5	@ Giants	0–4	Schmidt (8–6)	Pettitte (9–8)	—	SBC Park	39,686	59–50	L2
111	August 6	@ Giants	2–5	Lowry (7–11)	Oswalt (14–10)	—	SBC Park	41,959	59–51	L3
112	August 7	@ Giants	8–1	Clemens (11–4)	Eyre (2–2)	—	SBC Park	42,947	60–51	W1
113	August 9	Nationals	5–6	Patterson (6–3)	Astacio (2–5)	Cordero (37)	Minute Maid Park	34,255	60–52	L1
114	August 10	Nationals	7–6	Rodríguez (7–5)	Hernández (13–5)	Lidge (28)	Minute Maid Park	34,309	61–52	W1
115	August 11	Nationals	6–3	Pettitte (10–8)	Drese (7–12)	—	Minute Maid Park	35,036	62–52	W2
116	August 12	Pirates	6–5	Wheeler (2–3)	White (3–5)	Lidge (29)	Minute Maid Park	37,524	63–52	W3
117	August 13	Pirates	0–1	Torres (3–4)	Lidge (3–3)	Mesa (27)	Minute Maid Park	43,286	63–53	L1
118	August 14	Pirates	0–8	Williams (10–8)	Astacio (2–6)	—	Minute Maid Park	36,872	63–54	L2
119	August 15	Cubs	12–4	Rodríguez (8–5)	Rusch (5–5)	—	Minute Maid Park	26,992	64–54	W1
120	August 16	Cubs	1–4	Maddux (10–9)	Pettitte (10–9)	Dempster (17)	Minute Maid Park	31,963	64–55	L1
121	August 17	Cubs	2–4	Zambrano (10–5)	Oswalt (14–10)	Dempster (18)	Minute Maid Park	29,978	64–56	L2
122	August 18	Brewers	2–5	Ohka (8–7)	Clemens (11–5)	Turnbow (27)	Minute Maid Park	29,844	64–57	L3
123	August 19	Brewers	5–3	Springer (4–3)	Davis (9–9)	Lidge (30)	Minute Maid Park	31,651	65–57	W1
124	August 20	Brewers	2–3	Sheets (9–9)	Harville (0–2)	—	Minute Maid Park	41,101	65–58	L1
125	August 21	Brewers	8–3	Pettitte (11–9)	Santos (4–12)	—	Minute Maid Park	35,712	66–58	W1
126	August 22	@ Padres	6–2	Oswalt (15–10	Williams (6–10)	—	Petco Park	33,991	67–58	W2
127	August 23	@ Padres	0–2	Peavy (11–6)	Clemens (11–6)	—	Petco Park	37,985	67–59	L1
128	August 24	@ Padres	4–7	Park (11–6)	Rodríguez (8–6)	Hoffman (32)	Petco Park	30,928	67–60	L2
129	August 26	@ Dodgers	2–1	Pettitte (12–9)	Lowe (8–13)	Lidge (31)	Dodger Stadium	41,638	68–60	W1
130	August 27	@ Dodgers	3–8	Jackson (1–1)	Oswalt (15–11)	—	Dodger Stadium	51,738	68–61	L1
131	August 28	@ Dodgers	0–1	Weaver (13–8)	Qualls (3–4)	Sánchez (4)	Dodger Stadium	47,541	68–62	L2
132	August 30	Reds	5–2	Rodríguez (9–6)	Ortiz (8–10)	—	Minute Maid Park	29,971	69–62	W1
133	August 31	Reds	10–0	Pettitte (13–9)	Claussen (9–9)	—	Minute Maid Park	28,639	70–62	W2

September: 17–11 (Home: 7–6; Away: 10–5)

#	Date	Opponent	Score	Win	Loss	Save	Stadium	Attendance	Record	Report
134	September 1	Reds	3–1	Oswalt (16–11)	Harang (9–12)	Lidge (32)	Minute Maid Park	27,490	71–62	W3
135	September 2	Cardinals	6–5 (13)	Qualls (4–4)	Tavárez (2–3)	—	Minute Maid Park	38,511	72–62	W4
136	September 3	Cardinals	2–4	Carpenter (20–4)	Springer (4–4)	—	Minute Maid Park	42,817	72–63	L1
137	September 4	Cardinals	1–4	Marquis (11–13)	Rodríguez (9–7)	—	Minute Maid Park	38,277	72–64	L2
138	September 5	@ Phillies	4–3	Pettitte (14–9)	Myers (12–7)	Lidge (33)	Citizens Bank Park	36,144	73–64	W1
139	September 6	@ Phillies	2–1	Oswalt (17–11)	Wagner (4–2)	Lidge (34)	Citizens Bank Park	30,600	74–64	W2
140	September 7	@ Phillies	8–6	Qualls (5–4)	Wagner (4–3)	Lidge (35)	Citizens Bank Park	29,026	75–64	W3
141	September 9	@ Brewers	4–7	Davis (10–10)	Clemens (11–7)	Turnbow (30)	Miller Park	18,130	75–65	L1
142	September 10	@ Brewers	7–5	Pettitte (15–9)	Ohka (10–8)	Lidge (36)	Miller Park	24,437	76–65	W1
143	September 11	@ Brewers	2–4	Helling (2–0)	Oswalt (17–12)	Turnbow (31)	Miller Park	17,392	76–66	L1
144	September 12	Marlins	2–8	Willis (21–8)	Backe (8–8)	—	Minute Maid Park	27,538	76–67	L2
145	September 13	Marlins	2–4	Beckett (14–8)	Rodríguez (9–8)	Jones (37)	Minute Maid Park	31,512	76–68	L3
146	September 14	Marlins	10–2	Clemens (12–7)	Burnett (12–11)	—	Minute Maid Park	30,911	77–68	W1
147	September 15	Marlins	4–1	Pettitte (16–9)	Vargas (5–4)	Lidge (37)	Minute Maid Park	35,960	78–68	W2
148	September 16	Brewers	2–1	Lidge (4–3)	Eveland (1–1)	—	Minute Maid Park	33,767	79–68	W3
149	September 17	Brewers	7–0	Backe (9–8)	Obermueller (1–4)	—	Minute Maid Park	37,756	80–68	W4
150	September 18	Brewers	6–1	Rodríguez (10–8)	Capuano (17–10)	—	Minute Maid Park	35,052	81–68	W5
151	September 19	@ Pirates	0–7	Snell (1–2)	Clemens (12–8)	—	PNC Park	13,865	81–69	L1
152	September 20	@ Pirates	7–4	Pettitte (17–9)	Gorzelanny (0–1)	—	PNC Park	12,927	82–69	W1
153	September 21	@ Pirates	12–8	Oswalt (18–12)	Wells (7–17)	—	PNC Park	16,266	83–69	W2
154	September 22	@ Pirates	2–1	Backe (10–8)	Duke (6–2)	Lidge (38)	PNC Park	12,587	84–69	W3
155	September 23	@ Cubs	4–5	Rusch (8–8)	Rodríguez (10–9)	Dempster (30)	Wrigley Field	38,622	84–70	L1
156	September 24	@ Cubs	8–3	Astacio (3–6)	Zambrano (14–6)	—	Wrigley Field	39,263	85–70	W1
157	September 25	@ Cubs	2–3	Williams (6–9)	Gallo (0–1)	Dempster (31)	Wrigley Field	38,121	85–71	L1
158	September 27	@ Cardinals	3–1	Oswalt (19–12)	Morris (14–10)	Lidge (39)	Busch Memorial Stadium	40,260	86–71	W1
159	September 28	@ Cardinals	7–6	Qualls (6–4)	Isringhausen (1–2)	Lidge (40)	Busch Memorial Stadium	40,616	87–71	W2
160	September 29	Cubs	2–3	Rusch (9–8)	Rodríguez (10–10)	Dempster (32)	Minute Maid Park	37,820	87–72	L1
161	September 30	Cubs	3–4	Novoa (4–5)	Lidge (4–4)	Dempster (33)	Minute Maid Park	41,304	87–73	L2

October: 2–0 (Home: 2–0; Away: 0–0)

#	Date	Opponent	Score	Win	Loss	Save	Stadium	Attendance	Record	Report
162	October 1	Cubs	3–1	Clemens (13–8)	Williams (6–10)	Lidge (41)	Minute Maid Park	42,021	88–73	W1
163	October 2	Cubs	6–4	Oswalt (20–12)	Maddux (13–15)	Lidge (42)	Minute Maid Park	42,288	89–73	W2

=== Postseason log ===
2005 Postseason Game Log: 7–7 (Home: 4–3; Road: 3–4)
NL Division Series: 3–1 (Home: 2–0; Road: 1–1)

#	Date	Opponent	Score	Win	Loss	Save	Stadium	Attendance	Series
1	October 5	@ Braves	10–5	Pettitte (1–0)	Hudson (0–1)	—	Turner Field	40,590	1–0
2	October 6	@ Braves	1–7	Smoltz (1–0)	Clemens (0–1)	—	Turner Field	46,181	1–1
3	October 8	Braves	7–3	Oswalt (1–0)	Sosa (0–1)	—	Minute Maid Park	43,759	2–1
4	October 9	Braves	7–6 (18)	Clemens (1–1)	Devine (0–1)	—	Minute Maid Park	43,413	3–1

NL Championship Series: 4–2 (Home: 2–1; Road: 2–1)

#	Date	Opponent	Score	Win	Loss	Save	Stadium	Attendance	Series
1	October 12	@ Cardinals	3–5	Carpenter (2–0)	Pettitte (1–1)	Isringhausen (2)	Busch Memorial Stadium	52,332	0–1
2	October 13	@ Cardinals	4–1	Oswalt (2–0)	Mulder (1–1)	Lidge (1)	Busch Memorial Stadium	52,358	1–1
3	October 15	Cardinals	4–3	Clemens (2–1)	Morris (1–1)	Lidge (2)	Minute Maid Park	42,823	2–1
4	October 16	Cardinals	2–1	Qualls (1–0)	Marquis (0–1)	Lidge (3)	Minute Maid Park	43,010	3–1
5	October 17	Cardinals	4–5	Isringhausen (1–0)	Lidge (0–1)	—	Minute Maid Park	43,470	3–2
6	October 19	@ Cardinals	7–1	Oswalt (3–0)	Mulder (1–2)	—	Busch Memorial Stadium	52,438	4–2

World Series: 0–4 (Home: 0–2; Road: 0–2)

#	Date	Opponent	Score	Win	Loss	Save	Stadium	Attendance	Series
1	October 22	@ White Sox	3–5	Contreras (3–1)	Rodríguez (0–1)	Jenks (3)	U. S. Cellular Field	41,206	0–1
2	October 23	@ White Sox	6–7	Cotts (1–0)	Lidge (0–2)	—	U. S. Cellular Field	41,432	0–2
3	October 25	White Sox	5–7 (14)	Marte (1–0)	Astacio (0–1)	Buehrle (1)	Minute Maid Park	42,848	0–3
4	October 26	White Sox	0–1	Garcia (1–0)	Lidge (0–3)	Jenks (4)	Minute Maid Park	42,936	0–4

== Postseason ==
=== National League Divisional Playoffs ===
The Astros faced a rematch in the Atlanta Braves in the Division Series. This was the fifth time the two teams had met in the postseason (1997, 1999, 2001, 2004, 2005), and the Astros were looking to add on reaching the second round of the postseason in back-to-back years; the two teams had met for six games in the regular season, for which Houston won only once.

==== Games 1 through 3 ====
In Game 1 in Atlanta, the Astros struck first on a Morgan Ensberg RBI single, but Chipper Jones tied the game as the first inning ended. Ensberg gave the Astros the lead again on a bases-loaded single made it 3–1. Craig Biggio hit a sacrifice fly to drive in Brad Ausmus to make it 4–1 in the fourth, but Andruw Jones cut into the lead with a two-run shot to make it 4–3. Enberg struck again in the seventh with a RBI hit to drive in Andy Pettitte after he had hit a double. The Astros finally broke the game all the way through in the eighth, scoring five runs on the bases of four hits, three walks, and a wild pitch. The Astros prevailed in Game 1 by a score of 10–5.

Despite having Roger Clemens on the mound for Game 2, he was outmatched by John Smoltz, who allowed just one run while the Braves used the efforts of rookie Brian McCann (who hit a three-run shot in the second) to win 7–1.

Back in Houston for Game 3, the Astros struck first again by the efforts of Morgan Ensberg and Jason Lane, who made it 2-0 after one inning. McCann and pitcher Jorge Sosa tied the game on hits with two out in the next inning, but Mike Lamb would hit a home run in the third inning to make it 3–2. In the seventh, the Astros took advantage of Chris Reitsma (and others) on the mound, scoring four runs in the inning after hits by Lance Berkman, Ensberg and Lane went with a sacrifice fly by Adam Everett; the Astros prevailed 7–3.

==== Game 4 ====
Game 4 proved to be a classic for the ages despite its initial misgivings for Houston, featuring a grand slam that began a rally, a ninth-inning game-tying blast, and finally, an extra-innings, series-ending, walk-off drive. Adam LaRoche hit a grand slam off Brandon Backe to make it 4–0 in the third inning. The Braves added another run in the fifth that was matched by Houston, but the Braves scored in the top of the eighth inning with a McCann home run off Wandy Rodríguez to make it 6–1. However, the Astros struck back, punctuated by first-time home run achievements in the playoffs for the club. First, in the bottom of the eighth, Lance Berkman answered LaRoche's grand slam with his own blast off Kyle Farnsworth to shrink Atlanta's lead to 6–5. Berkman's grand slam represented the first-ever in the postseason by a Houston Astro.

One inning later, with two out in the bottom of the ninth inning, Brad Ausmus stepped up to the plate against Farnsworth and proceeded to hit a home run, tying the game at six to send it to extra innings. The two teams traded zeroes for the next eight innings while setting a record for the longest postseason game in MLB history; Roger Clemens pitched three innings of relief. In the bottom of the 18th, with Joey Devine on the mound for Atlanta, Chris Burke lined a shot to left field that cleared the scoreboard for the series-ending, walk-off home run. Burke's drive was Houston's first-ever playoff series-ending home run, and just their second-ever walk-off home run in the playoffs. In Game 1 of the 1981 NLDS, Alan Ashby ended the contest from a Dave Stewart offering for a 3–1 decision over Los Angeles. The same fan who caught Berkman's grand slam also caught Burke's walk-off home run. He turned in both baseballs to the team, which were then both donated to the Baseball Hall of Fame for the Astros' display.

This was also the second postseason series victory for the Astros, sequentially—with both having occurred against Atlanta—sending them back to the National League Championship Series.

=== National League Championship Series ===
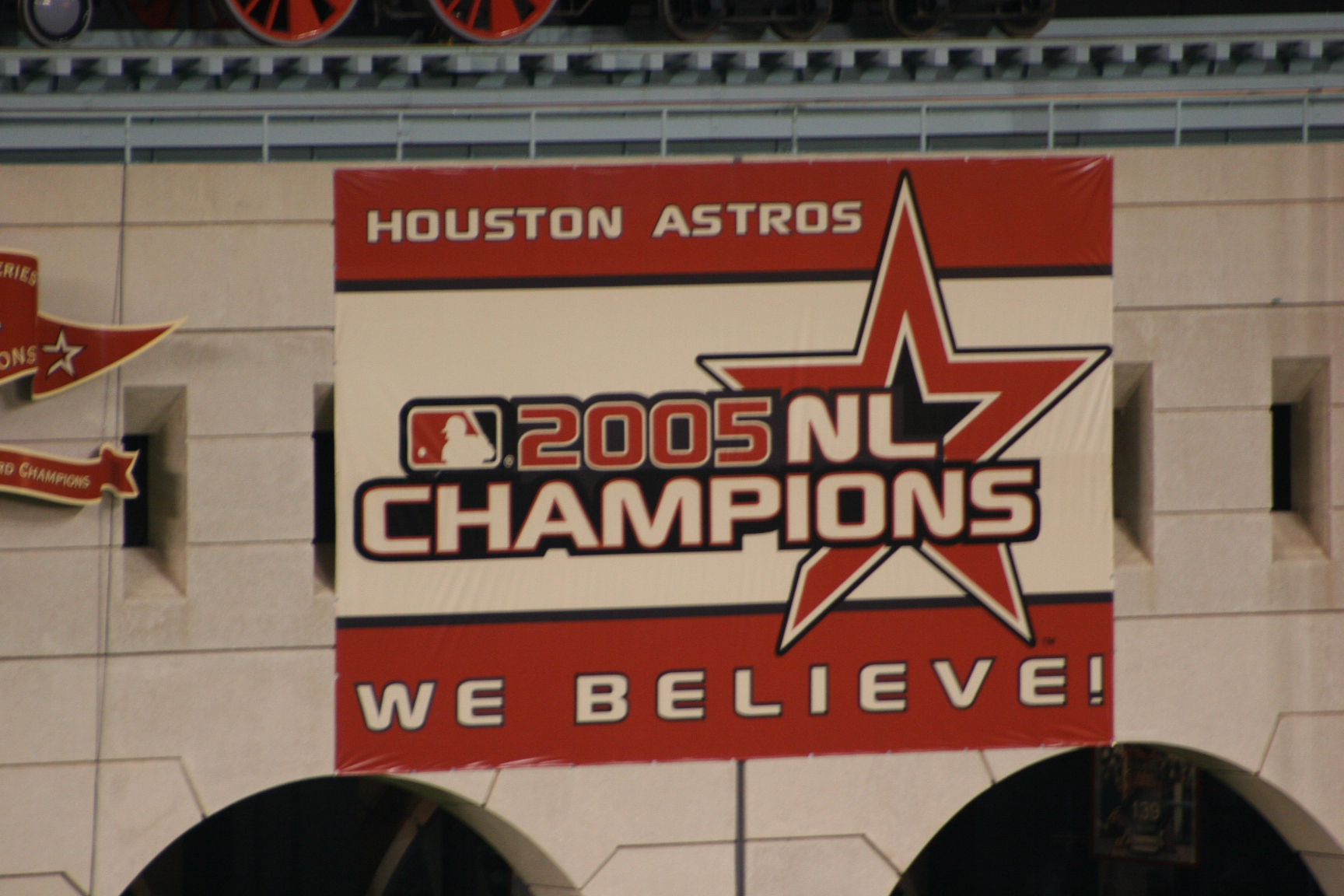
The 2005 National League championship banner at Minute Maid Park.

The opponent for the Astros in the Championship Series was a familiar foe: the St. Louis Cardinals, their rival in the National League Central. They had previously matched up against each other in the previous NLCS, which saw the Astros lose in seven games, needing only one more win to reach the Series. The Cardinals had won 100 games and had beaten Houston in eleven of sixteen games this season (worst among their division foes) Game 1 was controlled by St. Louis from the jump. Reggie Sanders hit a two-out homerun with David Eckstein on base to make it 2–0. A sacrifice bunt by the pitcher drove in a third run in the second inning. Eckstein drove a run in with a single while Albert Pujols capped the scoring for the Cardinals with a single. The only scoring for Houston came late, as Chris Burke hit a two-run shot off the bullpen to make it 5–2 in the seventh before Brad Ausmus hit a sacrifice fly to make it 5–3, but reliever Jason Isringhausen finished the Astros off with no further damage. This was the fifth straight loss for the Astros in a postseason game played in St. Louis. Game 2 proved a different story. Burke lined a triple with one out and then scored later when Cardinals pitcher Mark Mulder threw a ball past the catcher. Brad Ausmus lined a double in the fifth inning and then was driven home on a bunt and ground out to make it 2–0. Albert Pujols lined a home run to start the sixth inning, but the Cardinals were out-hit 11-6 and scored no more; Burke and Adam Everett would lend a hand with RBI hits to even the series at one.

In Game 3 back in Houston, Mike Lamb hit a two-run shot off Matt Morris to give them a 2–0 lead in the fourth inning. Roger Clemens would allow back-to-back hits in the fifth and sixth inning that saw the Cardinals score a run each to tie the game. However, in the sixth inning, Lamb hit a double that set him up to score when Jason Lane hit a single. A further single lead to Adam Everett at the plate, who hit into a fielder's choice that made it 4–2. While the Cardinals scored a run in the ninth inning on an RBI double, they could not crack Brad Lidge (who until this game had allowed no runs against St. Louis since May 2003) as Houston now led the Series. Game 4 was a tight affair that saw the bullpens flicker more than the offense, which saw eleven combined hits lead to three runs. Pujols gave the Cardinals the lead on a sacrifice fly in the 4th, but Jason Lane hit a home run off Jeff Suppan to tie it. In the seventh inning, the Astros had the bases loaded with less than two outs. With Morgan Ensberg at the plate, he hit a flyout that gave enough room to score a run from the third base. The Cardinals had a prime chance in the ninth inning when Lidge allowed back-to-back singles, but this would be followed by a groundball that led to a play at the plate that saw Pujols out at home for one out. John Mabry then grounded into a double play to give Houston a 3–1 lead. In Game 5, the Astros were one away from history. Craig Biggio started the scoring with an RBI single in the second, but St. Louis responded by hitting a single with the bases loaded to drive in two runs. In the seventh inning, with two on base and starter Chris Carpenter trying to go through the inning clean, Lance Berkman hit a home run to give the Astros a 4–2 lead. It set the stage for a pivotal ninth inning with Lidge set to close the inning. He got two easy outs before Eckstein lined a single with two strikes; this was followed by Jim Edmonds drawing a walk. Lidge now faced Albert Pujols at the plate; he hit a shot to left field that would give St. Louis a 5–4 lead that proved the difference in making the series now 3–2 in favor of Houston. Game 6, played at Busch Stadium, was a rematch between Game 2 starters Roy Oswalt and Mark Mulder. Houston set up the scoring with getting runners on second and third base in the third inning before Mulder threw a wild pitch that scored a run; Biggio then hit a single to drive in the other runner to make it 2–0. Jason Lane hit his second home run of the series in the fourth inning to make it 3–0. Roy Oswalt would dominate the Cardinals for seven innings, allowing only a run on a sacrifice fly in the fifth inning as the bullpen took control from there while adding two insurance runs in the sixth and seventh. With Dan Wheeler on the mound, Yadier Molina hit a flyball to right field that was caught by Jason Lane for the final out, clinching the first ever pennant for the Astros in history. Oswalt, who went 2–0 with a 1.29 ERA in 14 innings, was named NLCS MVP, the second time an Astro had won the award and first since Mike Scott in 1986.

=== World Series ===
By virtue of winning both their first league pennant and World Series qualification, the Astros faced both the Chicago White Sox and an American League club in the playoffs for the first time. After having played 4,714 games and their entire major league careers together in Houston, Jeff Bagwell and Craig Biggio appeared in their first World Series in 2005.

==== Game 1 ====
October 22, 2005 at U.S. Cellular Field in Chicago

Playing in their first World Series home game since 1959, the White Sox took an early lead with a home run from Jermaine Dye in the first inning. The Sox scored two more in the second when Juan Uribe doubled in A. J. Pierzynski after Carl Everett had already scored on a groundout earlier in the inning. The Astros responded again in the next inning when Lance Berkman hit a double, driving in Adam Everett and Craig Biggio. In the White Sox half of the fourth, Joe Crede hit what turned out to be the game-winning home run. In the bottom of the eighth, Scott Podsednik hit a triple with Pierzynski on second. Roger Clemens recorded his shortest World Series start, leaving after the second inning with 53 pitches including 35 for strikes, due to a sore hamstring that he had previously injured (and caused him to miss his last regular season start) as the loss went to Wandy Rodríguez. José Contreras pitched seven innings, allowing three runs on six hits for the win, and Bobby Jenks earned the save to give the White Sox a 1–0 lead in the series. When Neal Cotts entered the game in the top of the 8th it marked the first time in 5 games that the White Sox had gone to their bullpen.

Team	1	2	3	4	5	6	7	8	9	R	H	E
Houston	0	1	2	0	0	0	0	0	0	3	7	1
Chicago	1	2	0	1	0	0	0	1	X	5	10	0
WP: José Contreras (1-0) LP: Wandy Rodríguez (0-1) Sv: Bobby Jenks (1); Home runs: HOU: Mike Lamb (1); CHW: Jermaine Dye (1), Joe Crede (1)

==== Game 2 ====
October 23, 2005 at U.S. Cellular Field in Chicago

On a miserably cold (51 degrees) and rainy evening, Morgan Ensberg's first-pitch home run off starter Mark Buehrle put the Astros on top in the second inning. The White Sox answered in the bottom of the second with two runs of their own off Andy Pettitte. Lance Berkman drove in three runs in the game, two of them on a go-ahead double in the top of the fifth. In the seventh inning, Dan Wheeler loaded the bases with a double to Juan Uribe, a walk to Tadahito Iguchi, and home plate umpire Jeff Nelson's ruling that Jermaine Dye was hit by a pitched ball. The ruling was considered questionable, as television replays showed that the ball hit Dye's bat (which would have made the pitch a foul ball rather than a HBP). The Astros brought in Chad Qualls, who promptly served up a grand slam to Paul Konerko on the very first pitch he threw, the eighteenth grand slam in the annals of the Fall Classic. In the top of the ninth, White Sox closer Bobby Jenks blew the save when he gave up a two-run game-tying pinch hit single to José Vizcaíno. In the bottom half of the ninth, Astros closer Brad Lidge gave up a one-out, walk-off home run — the fourteenth in Series history — to Scott Podsednik, giving Lidge his second loss in as many post-season appearances (his previous appearance was in Game 5 of 2005 National League Championship Series). Podsednik had not hit a single homer in the regular season, and this was his second of the postseason. The Series moved to Houston with the White Sox leading 2–0.

Team	1	2	3	4	5	6	7	8	9	R	H	E
Houston	0	1	1	0	2	0	0	0	2	6	9	0
Chicago	0	2	0	0	0	0	4	0	1	7	12	0
WP: Neal Cotts (1-0) LP: Brad Lidge (0-1); Home runs: HOU: Morgan Ensberg (1); CHW: Paul Konerko (1), Scott Podsednik (1)

==== Game 3 ====
October 25, 2005 at Minute Maid Park in Houston, Texas

Game 3 was the first ever World Series game played in the state of Texas. Before the game, it was ruled by Commissioner Bud Selig that the retractable roof would be open at Minute Maid Park, weather permitting. The Astros objected, citing that their record in games with the roof closed was better than with the retractable roof open. Selig's office claimed that the ruling was based on the rules established by Houston and were consistent with how the Astros organization treated the situation all year long, as well as the weather forecasts for that period of time.

In the game – the longest World Series game in length of time (five hours and forty-one minutes) and tied for the longest in number of innings (fourteen, tied with Game 2 of the 1916 World Series) – Lance Berkman singled with one out after a Craig Biggio lead-off double in the bottom of the first as the Astros struck early. The White Sox had a rally snuffed in the top of the second inning; after Paul Konerko hit a lead-off double and A. J. Pierzynski walked, Aaron Rowand hit into a line-drive double play. Adam Everett caught the ball and then doubled Konerko off second by flipping the ball to Biggio, who stepped on the bag. Houston scored in the bottom of the third when Everett led off with a walk. Everett got caught in a rundown and got hit by the ball on a Juan Uribe throwing error that hit Everett. A Roy Oswalt sacrifice bunt and a Biggio single sent Everett home. Berkman singled again with two out, sending Biggio to third. Then Morgan Ensberg singled Biggio home for the third run of the game. Jason Lane led off the Astros' fourth with a home run to left-center field. It was later shown in replays that the ball should not have been ruled a home run, hitting the left side of the yellow line on the unusual wall in left-center field.

The White Sox rallied in the top of the fifth, true to their "Win Or Die Trying" mantra of 2005, starting with a Joe Crede lead-off homer. Uribe, on first after hitting a single, scored on a Tadahito Iguchi base hit with one out, followed by Scott Podsednik coming home on a duck-snort single by Jermaine Dye. Pierzynski hit a two-out double to Tal's Hill, driving in two runs, scoring Iguchi and Dye giving the White Sox the lead. The Astros rallied in the last of the eighth with two outs when Lane's double scored Ensberg with the tying run after back-to-back walks by Ensberg and Mike Lamb, giving Dustin Hermanson a blown save. Houston tried to rally to win in the ninth, but stranded Chris Burke at third, after he had walked, reached second on an error and stolen third.

The Astros tried again in the tenth as well as in the eleventh, but failed each time. In the top of the fourteenth, after the Sox hit into a spectacular double play started by Ensberg, Geoff Blum (a former Astro) homered to right with two outs off Ezequiel Astacio. After two infield singles by Rowand and Crede that went a total of 150 feet according to McCarver, Uribe walked, and then Chris Widger walked thanks to Astacio's sudden wildness. The Astros tried to rally with the tying runs on first and third and two outs after a Uribe error, but Game 2 starter Mark Buehrle earned the save for winning pitcher Dámaso Marte when Everett popped out, bringing the White Sox one game closer to their first World Championship in eighty-eight years. Buehrle became the first pitcher ever to start a game in the Series, and save the next one.

Many records were set or tied in the game besides time and innings: The teams combined to use seventeen pitchers (nine for the White Sox, eight for the Astros), throwing a total of 482 pitches, and walking twenty-one batters combined (a dozen by Chicago, nine by Houston); forty-three players were used (the White Sox used twenty-two and the Astros used twenty-one), and thirty men were left on base (fifteen for each team), all new high-water marks in their categories in Fall Classic history. Scott Podsednik set a new all-time record with eight official-at-bats in this game. One record that was tied was most double plays turned, with six (four by the Astros, two by the White Sox).

Team	1	2	3	4	5	6	7	8	9	10	11	12	13	14	R	H	E
Chicago	0	0	0	0	5	0	0	0	0	0	0	0	0	2	7	14	3
Houston	1	0	2	1	0	0	0	1	0	0	0	0	0	0	5	8	1
WP: Dámaso Marte (1-0) LP: Ezequiel Astacio (0-1) Sv: Mark Buehrle (1); Home runs: CHW: Joe Crede (2), Geoff Blum (1); HOU: Jason Lane (1)

==== Game 4 ====
October 26, 2005 at Minute Maid Park in Houston, Texas

Before the game, Major League Baseball unveiled its Latino Legends Team.

The fourth game was the pitchers' duel that had been promised throughout the series. Both Houston starter Brandon Backe and Chicago starter Freddy García put zeros on the scoreboard through seven innings, the longest since Game 7 of the 1991 World Series. Scott Podsednik had a two-out triple in the top of the third, but Tadahito Iguchi grounded out to second, thus snuffing that threat. The Astros had the best chance of scoring in the sixth, but Jason Lane struck out with the bases loaded to end that rally. The White Sox had a chance in the top of the seventh with runners at second and third and two out, but shortstop Juan Uribe struck out to snuff the rally. The White Sox were able to break through in the next inning against embattled Houston closer Brad Lidge. Willie Harris hit a pinch-hit single. Podsednik moved Harris to second with a sacrifice bunt. Carl Everett pinch-hit for Iguchi and grounded out to the right side to allow Harris to move over to third. Jermaine Dye, the Most Valuable Player of the series, had the game-winning single, driving in Harris.

Things got a little sticky for the Sox in the Astros half of the eighth when reliever Cliff Politte hit Willy Taveras, threw a wild pitch, sending Taveras to second, and walked Lance Berkman. After Morgan Ensberg flew out to center, ChiSox manager Ozzie Guillén brought in Neal Cotts to finish the inning. Cotts induced pinch-hitter José Vizcaíno into a ground out to Uribe. Bobby Jenks, the 24-year-old fireballer, started the ninth inning. He allowed a single to Jason Lane and a sacrifice bunt to Brad Ausmus. Chris Burke came in to pinch-hit; he fouled one off to the left side, but Uribe made an amazing catch in the stands to retire Burke.

The game ended when Orlando Palmeiro grounded to Uribe. It was a bang-bang play as Paul Konerko caught the ball from Uribe at 11:01 p.m. CDT to begin the biggest celebration in Chicago since the sixth NBA championship by the Bulls in 1998, and end the second-longest period without a World Series title (the cross-town Chicago Cubs owned the longest such streak at the time, as they had not won since 1908, until winning in 2016). The 1–0 shutout was the first 1-run game to end a World Series since the 1995 World Series, in which Game 6 was won by the Atlanta Braves over the Cleveland Indians, and the first 1–0 game in any Series game since Game 5 of the 1996 World Series when the New York Yankees shut out the Braves in the last game ever played at Atlanta–Fulton County Stadium.

Team	1	2	3	4	5	6	7	8	9	R	H	E
Chicago	0	0	0	0	0	0	0	1	0	1	8	0
Houston	0	0	0	0	0	0	0	0	0	0	5	0
WP: Freddy García (1-0) LP: Brad Lidge (0-2) Sv: Bobby Jenks (2)

==== Composite box ====
2005 World Series (4–0): Chicago White Sox (A.L.) over Houston Astros (N.L.)

Team	1	2	3	4	5	6	7	8	9	10	11	12	13	14	R	H	E
Chicago White Sox	1	4	0	1	5	0	4	2	1	0	0	0	0	2	20	44	3
Houston Astros	1	2	5	1	2	0	0	1	2	0	0	0	0	0	14	29	2
Total attendance: 166,422 Average attendance: 42,106

== Awards and achievements ==
=== Grand slams ===
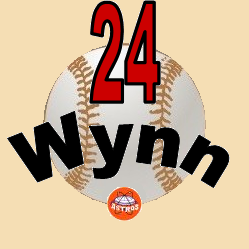
Jimmy Wynn's number 24 was retired by the Houston Astros in 2005.

No.	Date	Astros batter	Venue	Inning	Pitcher	Opposing team	Box
1	May 1	Mike Lamb (Note: 1st MLB grand slam)	Minute Maid Park	5 (Note: Tied score or took lead)	Danny Graves	Chicago Cubs	
2	June 28	Morgan Ensberg	Coors Field	5	Jason Jennings	Colorado Rockies	
3 (Note: Game 4 of National League Division Series)	October 9	Lance Berkman	Minute Maid Park	8	Kyle Farnsworth	Atlanta Braves	
	Hit during playoffs						

=== Career honors ===
Career honors received in 2005
Honor / mention received	Individual	Role	Uni.	Start	Finish	All-Star	Bio. / Games	Summ.
Houston Astros uniform numbers retired	Jimmy Wynn	Outfielder	24	1963	1973	1	1,426 games	
Texas Sports Hall of Fame inductee	Jeff Bagwell	First baseman	5	1991	2005	4	2,150 games	
Texas Sports Hall of Fame inductee	Craig Biggio	Second baseman	7	1988	2007	7	2,850 games	

=== Annual awards ===
2005 Houston Astros award winners
Name of award		Recipient	Ref.
Baseball Digest Rookie All-Star	Outfielder	Willy Taveras	
Darryl Kile Good Guy Award		Morgan Ensberg	
Delivery Man of the Month	July	Brad Lidge	
Fred Hartman Award for Long and Meritorious Service to Baseball		Gene Coleman	
Houston-Area Major League Player of the Year	CIN	Adam Dunn	
Houston Astros	Most Valuable Player (MVP)	Morgan Ensberg	
Houston Astros	Pitcher of the Year	Roger Clemens	
Houston Astros	Rookie of the Year	Willy Taveras	
Hutch Award		Craig Biggio	
MLB All-Star Game	Reserve pitcher	Roger Clemens	
MLB All-Star Game	Reserve infielder	Morgan Ensberg	
MLB All-Star Game	Reserve pitcher	Brad Lidge	
MLB All-Star Game	Reserve pitcher	Roy Oswalt	
National League Championship Series Most Valuable Player (NLCS MVP)		Roy Oswalt	
National League (NL) Pitcher of the Month	July	Andy Pettitte	
National League (NL) Pitcher of the Month	September	Andy Pettitte	
National League (NL) Player of the Week	July 3	Morgan Ensberg	
Players Choice Awards	NL Outstanding Rookie	Willy Taveras	
Silver Slugger Award	Third baseman	Morgan Ensberg	
The Sporting News	NL Rookie of the Year	Willy Taveras	
The Sporting News	NL All-Star Third baseman	Morgan Ensberg	
Topps All-Star Rookie Team	Outfielder	Willy Taveras	

Other awards results

Name of award	Voting recipient(s) (Team)	Ref.
Delivery Man of the Year	Winner—Rivera (NYY) • Finalist—Lidge (HOU)	
NL Cy Young Award	1st—Carpenter (STL) • 3rd—Clemens (HOU) • 4th—Oswalt (HOU) • 5th, tied—Pettitte (HOU)	
NL Most Valuable Player	1st—Pujols (STL) • 4th—Ensberg (HOU); Other Astros: 14th—Berkman • 22nd—Clemens • 23rd—Oswalt • 24th—Pettitte • 30th—Lidge	
NL Manager of the Year	1st—Cox (ATL) • 3rd—Garner (HOU)	
NL Rookie of the Year	1st—Howard (PHI) • 2nd—Taveras (HOU)	
This Year in Baseball Best Closer	1st—Rivera (NYY) • 2nd—Lidge (HOU)	

=== League leaders ===
NL batting leaders

- Singles: Willy Taveras (152)

NL pitching leaders

- Earned run average (ERA): Roger Clemens (1.87—led MLB)
- Fielding Independent Pitching (FIP): Roger Clemens (2.87)
- Games started: Roy Oswalt (35—tied, led MLB)
- Hits per nine innings pitched (H/9): Roger Clemens (6.4—led MLB)

=== Milestones ===
==== Major League debuts ====
Player—Appeared at position

- Mike Burns, relief pitcher
- Charlton Jimerson, center fielder
Date and opponent

- May 13 vs San Francisco
- September 14 vs Florida
Box

Also:

== Minor league system ==
=== Teams ===
Level	Team	League	Manager
AAA	Round Rock Express	Pacific Coast League	Jackie Moore
AA	Corpus Christi Hooks	Texas League	Dave Clark
A	Salem Avalanche	Carolina League	Iván DeJesús
A	Lexington Legends	South Atlantic League	Tim Bogar
A-Short Season	Tri-City ValleyCats	New York–Penn League	Gregg Langbehn
Rookie	Greeneville Astros	Appalachian League	Russ Nixon

=== Awards ===
2005 Houston Astros minor league system award winners
Name of award		Recipient	Ref.
All-Star Futures Game	Pitcher	Troy Patton	
Houston Astros Minor League Player of the Year		Hunter Pence	
South Atlantic League Most Outstanding Prospect		Hunter Pence	
Texas League Pitcher of the Year		Jason Hirsh	
Texas League All-Star	Right-handed pitcher	Jason Hirsh	

== See also ==
- List of Major League Baseball annual ERA leaders
- List of Major League Baseball career hit by pitch leaders
- List of Major League Baseball doubles records
- List of Major League Baseball franchise postseason streaks
- List of Major League Baseball players who spent their entire career with one franchise
- List of Major League Baseball retired numbers
- List of Major League Baseball titles leaders
- List of walk-off home runs in the postseason and All-Star Game
- List of World Series sweeps
