= 2005 Philadelphia Phillies season =

Major League Baseball season

2005 Philadelphia Phillies
- League: National League
- Division: East
- Ballpark: Citizens Bank Park
- City: Philadelphia
- Record: 88–74 (.543)
- Divisional place: 2nd
- Owners: Bill Giles
- General managers: Ed Wade
- Managers: Charlie Manuel
- Television: WPSG\KYW-TV; CSN Philadelphia
- Radio: WIP/WPHT (Harry Kalas, Larry Andersen, Chris Wheeler, Scott Graham, Tom McCarthy); WPWA (Bill Kulik, Danny Martinez)

The 2005 Philadelphia Phillies season was the 123rd season in the history of the franchise. The Phillies finished in second place in the National League East with a record of 88–74, two games behind the Atlanta Braves, and one game behind the NL Champion Houston Astros, who won the NL Wild Card race for the second consecutive season. The Phillies were managed by their new manager Charlie Manuel, as they played their home games at Citizens Bank Park. First baseman Ryan Howard was named the National League Rookie of the Year for the 2005 season.

== Offseason ==
- October 29, 2004: Chris Coste signed as a free agent with the Philadelphia Phillies.
- November 15, 2004: AJ Hinch was signed as a free agent with the Philadelphia Phillies.
- December 3, 2004: Kenny Lofton was traded by the New York Yankees to the Philadelphia Phillies for Felix Rodriguez.

== Regular season ==
- On September 14, 2005, Andruw Jones of the Atlanta Braves hit his 300th career home run which went 430 feet off Phils reliever Geoff Geary in a 12–4 Phillies win. The ball landed in the upper deck in left field.

The Phillies again contended for the wild card down to the last day of the season. But an 0–6 record against the eventual wild card-winning Houston Astros doomed the team. One loss included a game on September 7, in which the Phillies led 6–5 in the ninth inning. With Billy Wagner on the mound, the Phillies gave up a fielding error and an infield single with two outs before Craig Biggio went up to the plate. Biggio subsequently lined a deep shot into left field that gave the Astros an 8–6 lead that the Phillies did not recover from.

As a result of another year out of the playoffs, general manager Ed Wade was fired at the end of the season.

=== Season standings ===
==== National League East ====
NL East
Team	W	L	Pct.	GB	Home	Road
Atlanta Braves	90	72	.556	—	53‍–‍28	37‍–‍44
Philadelphia Phillies	88	74	.543	2	46‍–‍35	42‍–‍39
Florida Marlins	83	79	.512	7	45‍–‍36	38‍–‍43
New York Mets	83	79	.512	7	48‍–‍33	35‍–‍46
Washington Nationals	81	81	.500	9	41‍–‍40	40‍–‍41

==== Record vs. opponents ====
2005 National League record Source: MLB Standings Grid – 2005
Team	AZ	ATL	CHC	CIN	COL	FLA	HOU	LAD	MIL	NYM	PHI	PIT	SD	SF	STL	WAS	AL
Arizona	—	3–3	5–2	2–4	11–7	2–4	3–3	13–5	2–4	1–6	3–4	3–4	10–9	7–11	2–5	2–4	8–10
Atlanta	3–3	—	6–1	7–3	2–4	10–8	5–1	3–3	3–3	13–6	9–10	4–3	1–5	4–2	3–3	10–9	7–8
Chicago	2–5	1–6	—	6–9	4–3	5–4	9–7	4–2	7–9	2–4	2–4	11–5	4–3	5–2	10–6	1–5	6–9
Cincinnati	4–2	3–7	9–6	—	3–3	2–4	4–12	3–4	6–10	3–3	3–4	9–7	4–2	3–5	5–11	5–1	7-8
Colorado	7–11	4–2	3–4	3–3	—	3–3	1–5	11–8	1–5	3–4	2–4	3–7	7–11	7–11	4–4	2–4	6–9
Florida	4–2	8–10	4–5	4–2	3–3	—	4–3	5–2	3–4	8–10	9–10	3–4	2–4	4–2	3–4	9–9	10–5
Houston	3–3	1–5	7–9	12–4	5–1	3-4	—	4–2	10–5	5–5	6–0	9–7	4–3	3–4	5–11	5–2	7–8
Los Angeles	5–13	3–3	2–4	4–3	8–11	2–5	2–4	—	5–1	3–3	3–3	5–2	11–7	9–10	2–5	2–4	5–13
Milwaukee	4–2	3–3	9–7	10–6	5–1	4–3	5–10	1–5	—	3–3	4–5	9–7	3–4	4–3	5–11	4–4	8–7
New York	6–1	6–13	4–2	3–3	4–3	10–8	5–5	3–3	3–3	—	11–7	3–3	4–2	3–3	2–5	11–8	5–10
Philadelphia	4-3	10–9	4–2	4–3	4–2	10–9	0–6	3–3	5–4	7–11	—	4–3	6–0	5–1	4–2	11–8	7–8
Pittsburgh	4–3	3–4	5–11	7–9	7–3	4–3	7–9	2–5	7–9	3–3	3–4	—	3–4	2–4	4–12	1–5	5–7
San Diego	9–10	5–1	3–4	2–4	11–7	4–2	3–4	7–11	4–3	2–4	0–6	4–3	—	12–6	4–3	5–1	7–11
San Francisco	11–7	2–4	2–5	5–3	11–7	2–4	4–3	10–9	3–4	3–3	1–5	4–2	6–12	—	2–4	3–3	6–12
St. Louis	5–2	3–3	6–10	11–5	4–4	4-3	11–5	5–2	11–5	5–2	2–4	12–4	3–4	4–2	—	4–2	10–5
Washington	4–2	9–10	5–1	1–5	4–2	9-9	2–5	4–2	4–4	8–11	8–11	5–1	1–5	3–3	2–4	—	12–6

=== Transactions ===
- May 14, 2005: Marlon Byrd was traded by the Philadelphia Phillies to the Washington Nationals for Endy Chávez.
- June 8, 2005: Ugueth Urbina was traded by the Detroit Tigers with Ramón Martínez to the Philadelphia Phillies for Plácido Polanco.

=== Game log ===
Legend
	Phillies win
	Phillies loss
	Postponement
**Bold**	Phillies team member

2005 Game Log
Overall Record: 88–74
April (10–14)

#	Date	Opponent	Score	Win	Loss	Save	Attendance	Record
1	April 4	Nationals	8–4	**Jon Lieber** (1–0)	Liván Hernández (0–1)	None	44,080	1–0
2	April 6	Nationals	3–7	Joey Eischen (1–0)	**Tim Worrell** (0–1)	None	23,435	1–1
3	April 7	Nationals	4–5 (10)	Chad Cordero (1–0)	**Rhéal Cormier** (0–1)	None	21,693	1–2
4	April 8	@ Cardinals	5–6	Al Reyes (1–0)	**Ryan Madson** (0–1)	Jason Isringhausen (2)	50,074	1–3
5	April 9	@ Cardinals	10–4	**Gavin Floyd** (1–0)	Jeff Suppan (0–1)	None	39,242	2–3
6	April 10	@ Cardinals	13–4	**Jon Lieber** (2–0)	Chris Carpenter (1–1)	None	37,971	3–3
7	April 11	@ Marlins	4–1	**Brett Myers** (1–0)	Al Leiter (0–1)	**Billy Wagner** (1)	11,416	4–3
8	April 12	@ Marlins	2–8	A. J. Burnett (1–1)	**Randy Wolf** (0–1)	None	15,129	4–4
9	April 13	@ Marlins	0–4	Dontrelle Willis (2–0)	**Cory Lidle** (0–1)	None	14,427	4–5
10	April 15	Braves	4–11	Horacio Ramírez (1–0)	**Gavin Floyd** (1–1)	None	31,408	4–6
11	April 16	Braves	2–1	**Jon Lieber** (3–0)	John Smoltz (0–3)	**Billy Wagner** (2)	36,820	5–6
12	April 17	Braves	2–1 (10)	**Ryan Madson** (1–1)	Dan Kolb (0–2)	None	32,008	6–6
13	April 18	Mets	5–4	**Randy Wolf** (1–1)	Kaz Ishii (0–2)	**Tim Worrell** (1)	25,236	7–6
14	April 19	Mets	4–16	Víctor Zambrano (1–1)	**Vicente Padilla** (0–1)	None	28,063	7–7
15	April 20	Rockies	4–7	Jamey Wright (1–1)	**Cory Lidle** (0–2)	None	25,961	7–8
16	April 21	Rockies	6–3	**Jon Lieber** (4–0)	Joe Kennedy (1–2)	**Billy Wagner** (3)	21,749	8–8
17	April 22	@ Braves	2–6	Mike Hampton (2–0)	**Brett Myers** (1–1)	Dan Kolb (6)	26,837	8–9
18	April 23	@ Braves	1–11	Tim Hudson (2–0)	**Randy Wolf** (1–2)	None	31,656	8–10
19	April 24	@ Braves	0–4	John Thomson (2–2)	**Vicente Padilla** (0–2)	None	26,713	8–11
20	April 25	@ Nationals	5–4	**Cory Lidle** (1–2)	Zach Day (1–2)	**Billy Wagner** (4)	24,956	9–11
21	April 26	@ Nationals	1–3	John Patterson (2–1)	**Jon Lieber** (4–1)	Chad Cordero (4)	23,332	9–12
22	April 27	@ Nationals	3–0	**Rhéal Cormier** (1–1)	Esteban Loaiza (0–2)	**Billy Wagner** (5)	27,483	10–12
23	April 29	Marlins	4–6	A. J. Burnett (3–1)	**Randy Wolf** (1–3)	Todd Jones (1)	28,471	10–13
24	April 30	Marlins	1–2 (6)	Dontrelle Willis (5–0)	**Vicente Padilla** (0–3)	None	25,900	10–14

May (15–13)

#	Date	Opponent	Score	Win	Loss	Save	Attendance	Record
25	May 1	Marlins	8–6	**Cory Lidle** (2–2)	Josh Beckett (4–2)	**Billy Wagner** (6)	37,306	11–14
26	May 2	@ Mets	1–5	Pedro Martínez (3–1)	**Terry Adams** (0–1)	None	16,897	11–15
27	May 3	@ Mets	10–3	**Brett Myers** (2–1)	Tom Glavine (1–4)	None	17,051	12–15
28	May 4	@ Mets	2–3	Jae Weong Seo (2–1)	**Randy Wolf** (1–4)	Braden Looper (5)	21,356	12–16
29	May 5	@ Mets	5–7	Aaron Heilman (3–2)	**Vicente Padilla** (0–4)	Braden Looper (6)	19,553	12–17
30	May 6	@ Cubs	3–2	**Billy Wagner** (1–0)	LaTroy Hawkins (1–3)	None	38,767	13–17
31	May 7	@ Cubs	4–1	**Jon Lieber** (5–1)	Glendon Rusch (2–1)	**Billy Wagner** (7)	38,933	14–17
32	May 8	@ Cubs	1–2	Carlos Zambrano (3–1)	**Brett Myers** (2–2)	None	38,656	14–18
33	May 9	@ Brewers	4–2	**Randy Wolf** (2–4)	Víctor Santos (1–2)	**Billy Wagner** (8)	11,103	15–18
34	May 10	@ Brewers	5–8	Julio Santana (1–1)	**Terry Adams** (0–2)	Ricky Bottalico (1)	12,082	15–19
35	May 11	@ Brewers	2–5	Doug Davis (4–4)	**Cory Lidle** (2–3)	Derrick Turnbow (5)	13,175	15–20
36	May 12	Reds	5–7	Ramón Ortiz (1–1)	**Jon Lieber** (5–2)	Danny Graves (9)	33,663	15–21
37	May 13	Reds	12–2	**Brett Myers** (3–2)	Eric Milton (2–4)	None	27,071	16–21
38	May 14	Reds	4–12	Aaron Harang (2–2)	**Ryan Madson** (1–2)	None	30,189	16–22
39	May 15	Reds	4–3	**Vicente Padilla** (1–4)	Elizardo Ramírez (0–1)	**Billy Wagner** (9)	41,141	17–22
40	May 17	Cardinals	7–5	**Cory Lidle** (3–3)	Jeff Suppan (3–4)	**Billy Wagner** (10)	32,103	18–22
41	May 18	Cardinals	4–8	Chris Carpenter (6–2)	**Jon Lieber** (5–3)	None	29,130	18–23
42	May 19	Cardinals	7–4	**Brett Myers** (4–2)	Jason Marquis (5–3)	None	38,229	19–23
43	May 20	@ Orioles	9–3	**Randy Wolf** (3–4)	Daniel Cabrera (3–3)	None	34,642	20–23
44	May 21	@ Orioles	0–7	Érik Bédard (5–1)	**Vicente Padilla** (1–5)	None	42,331	20–24
45	May 22	@ Orioles	7–2	**Cory Lidle** (4–3)	Sidney Ponson (5–2)	None	41,614	21–24
46	May 23	@ Marlins	2–5	Dontrelle Willis (8–1)	**Jon Lieber** (5–4)	Todd Jones (7)	11,944	21–25
47	May 24	@ Marlins	3–4 (10)	John Riedling (2–0)	**Amaury Telemaco** (0–1)	None	18,419	21–26
48	May 25	@ Marlins	8–5	**Randy Wolf** (4–4)	Al Leiter (2–5)	**Billy Wagner** (11)	17,165	22–26
49	May 27	@ Braves	5–1	**Cory Lidle** (5–3)	John Smoltz (3–4)	None	31,501	23–26
50	May 28	@ Braves	12–5	**Jon Lieber** (6–4)	Horacio Ramírez (3–4)	None	34,975	24–26
51	May 29	@ Braves	2–7	Tim Hudson (6–3)	**Brett Myers** (4–3)	None	37,615	24–27
52	May 31	Giants	5–2	**Randy Wolf** (5–4)	Brett Tomko (4–7)	None	23,456	25–27

June (15–12)

#	Date	Opponent	Score	Win	Loss	Save	Attendance	Record
53	June 1	Giants	10–6	**Ryan Madson** (2–2)	LaTroy Hawkins (1–5)	None	24,546	26–27
54	June 2	Giants	6–5	**Jon Lieber** (7–4)	Brad Hennessey (2–2)	**Billy Wagner** (12)	25,589	27–27
–	June 3	Diamondbacks	Postponed (rain); Makeup: June 4 as a traditional double-header					
55	June 4 (1)	Diamondbacks	10–6	**Vicente Padilla** (2–5)	Javier Vázquez (5–4)	None	see 2nd game	28–27
56	June 4 (2)	Diamondbacks	5–3	**Brett Myers** (5–3)	Russ Ortiz (4–5)	**Billy Wagner** (13)	43,449	29–27
57	June 5	Diamondbacks	7–6	**Randy Wolf** (6–4)	Brad Halsey (4–3)	**Billy Wagner** (14)	37,582	30–27
58	June 6	Diamondbacks	8–10	Brandon Webb (7–2)	**Cory Lidle** (5–4)	Javier López (2)	25,570	30–28
59	June 7	Rangers	8–5	**Jon Lieber** (8–4)	Ryan Drese (4–6)	**Billy Wagner** (15)	33,616	31–28
60	June 8	Rangers	2–0	**Aaron Fultz** (1–0)	Chris Young (5–3)	**Billy Wagner** (16)	24,339	32–28
61	June 9	Rangers	10–8	**Vicente Padilla** (3–5)	Pedro Astacio (2–7)	**Billy Wagner** (17)	25,205	33–28
62	June 10	Brewers	5–2	**Ryan Madson** (3–2)	Matt Wise (0–2)	None	27,225	34–28
63	June 11	Brewers	7–5	**Rhéal Cormier** (2–1)	Ricky Bottalico (0–1)	**Ugueth Urbina** (10)	33,455	35–28
64	June 12	Brewers	6–2	**Cory Lidle** (6–4)	Ben Sheets (2–6)	None	40,385	36–28
65	June 14	@ Mariners	1–3	Gil Meche (6–4)	**Jon Lieber** (8–5)	Eddie Guardado (18)	26,818	36–29
66	June 15	@ Mariners	1–5	Aaron Sele (6–5)	**Vicente Padilla** (3–6)	None	26,019	36–30
67	June 16	@ Mariners	3–2 (13)	**Geoff Geary** (1–0)	Julio Mateo (2–2)	**Billy Wagner** (18)	27,162	37–30
68	June 17	@ Athletics	6–1	**Robinson Tejeda** (1–0)	Barry Zito (3–8)	None	15,601	38–30
69	June 18	@ Athletics	1–2	Kirk Saarloos (3–4)	**Cory Lidle** (6–5)	Justin Duchscherer (1)	20,332	38–31
70	June 19	@ Athletics	2–5	Joe Blanton (3–6)	**Jon Lieber** (8–6)	Justin Duchscherer (2)	30,619	38–32
71	June 21	Mets	5–8	Kris Benson (6–2)	**Brett Myers** (5–4)	Braden Looper (14)	43,050	38–33
72	June 22	Mets	8–4	**Ryan Madson** (4–2)	Royce Ring (0–2)	None	42,640	39–33
73	June 23	Mets	3–4	Kaz Ishii (2–6)	**Cory Lidle** (6–6)	Braden Looper (15)	45,449	39–34
74	June 24	Red Sox	0–8	Tim Wakefield (6–6)	**Jon Lieber** (8–7)	None	45,090	39–35
75	June 25	Red Sox	1–7	Matt Clement (9–1)	**Vicente Padilla** (3–7)	None	44,868	39–36
76	June 26	Red Sox	8–12	Mike Timlin (2–1)	**Rhéal Cormier** (2–2)	None	45,042	39–37
77	June 28	@ Mets	3–8	Víctor Zambrano (4–6)	**Robinson Tejeda** (1–1)	None	39,898	39–38
78	June 29	@ Mets	6–3	**Cory Lidle** (7–6)	Kaz Ishii (2–7)	**Billy Wagner** (19)	24,915	40–38
79	June 30	@ Mets	3–5	Pedro Martínez (9–2)	**Jon Lieber** (8–8)	Braden Looper (16)	36,667	40–39

July (15–12)

#	Date	Opponent	Score	Win	Loss	Save	Attendance	Record
80	July 1	Braves	1–9	John Smoltz (9–5)	**Vicente Padilla** (3–8)	None	45,004	40–40
81	July 2	Braves	6–4	**Brett Myers** (6–4)	Horacio Ramírez (7–5)	**Billy Wagner** (20)	29,205	41–40
82	July 3	Braves	3–4	Jim Brower (3–1)	**Billy Wagner** (1–1)	Chris Reitsma (7)	39,732	41–41
83	July 4	@ Pirates	12–1	**Cory Lidle** (8–6)	Dave Williams (6–6)	None	37,259	42–41
84	July 5	@ Pirates	0–3	Kip Wells (6–8)	**Ryan Madson** (4–3)	None	13,442	42–42
85	July 6	@ Pirates	5–0	**Vicente Padilla** (4–8)	Mark Redman (4–8)	None	19,961	43–42
86	July 7	@ Pirates	1–2	Zach Duke (1–0)	**Brett Myers** (6–5)	José Mesa (21)	20,942	43–43
87	July 8	Nationals	7–8	Ryan Drese (7–7)	**Robinson Tejeda** (1–2)	Chad Cordero (31)	44,688	43–44
88	July 9	Nationals	1–0	**Billy Wagner** (2–1)	Héctor Carrasco (3–2)	None	33,365	44–44
89	July 10	Nationals	5–4 (12)	**Rhéal Cormier** (3–2)	Sun-Woo Kim (1–2)	None	34,124	45–44
–	July 12	**2005 Major League Baseball All-Star Game** at Comerica Park in Detroit						
90	July 14	Marlins	13–7	**Brett Myers** (7–5)	A. J. Burnett (5–6)	None	29,660	46–44
91	July 15	Marlins	7–9	Brian Moehler (5–6)	**Cory Lidle** (8–7)	Todd Jones (14)	30,233	46–45
92	July 16	Marlins	10–5	**Jon Lieber** (9–8)	Scott Olsen (1–1)	None	33,268	47–45
93	July 17	Marlins	8–4	**Vicente Padilla** (5–8)	Dontrelle Willis (13–5)	None	36,419	48–45
94	July 19	Dodgers	5–4 (10)	**Billy Wagner** (3–1)	Yhency Brazobán (2–5)	None	29,349	49–45
95	July 20	Dodgers	2–10	Derek Lowe (6–10)	**Cory Lidle** (8–8)	None	31,164	49–46
96	July 21	Dodgers	0–1	Odalis Pérez (5–5)	**Jon Lieber** (9–9)	Yhency Brazobán (17)	36,232	49–47
97	July 22	Padres	8–6 (11)	**Aaron Fultz** (2–0)	Paul Quantrill (2–1)	None	28,600	50–47
98	July 23	Padres	2–0	**Robinson Tejeda** (2–2)	Pedro Astacio (2–9)	**Billy Wagner** (21)	33,992	51–47
99	July 24	Padres	5–1	**Brett Myers** (8–5)	Brian Lawrence (5–10)	None	35,322	52–47
100	July 25	@ Astros	1–7	Andy Pettitte (8–7)	**Cory Lidle** (8–9)	None	36,029	52–48
101	July 26	@ Astros	1–2	Roy Oswalt (14–8)	**Ryan Madson** (4–4)	None	33,867	52–49
102	July 27	@ Astros	2–3	Roger Clemens (9–4)	**Vicente Padilla** (5–9)	Brad Lidge (24)	38,071	52–50
103	July 28	@ Rockies	8–5	**Ugueth Urbina** (2–3)	Mike DeJean (4–2)	**Billy Wagner** (22)	22,015	53–50
104	July 29	@ Rockies	5–3	**Brett Myers** (9–5)	José Acevedo (2–1)	**Billy Wagner** (23)	21,855	54–50
105	July 30	@ Rockies	8–7	**Cory Lidle** (9–9)	Aaron Cook (0–1)	**Billy Wagner** (24)	33,418	55–50
106	July 31	@ Rockies	2–9	Jeff Francis (10–7)	**Jon Lieber** (9–10)	None	21,807	55–51

August (16–11)

#	Date	Opponent	Score	Win	Loss	Save	Attendance	Record
107	August 2	Cubs	1–2	Carlos Zambrano (8–4)	**Vicente Padilla** (5–10)	Ryan Dempster (15)	32,585	55–52
108	August 3	Cubs	4–3	**Billy Wagner** (4–1)	Mike Remlinger (0–3)	None	34,727	56–52
109	August 4	Cubs	6–4	**Brett Myers** (10–5)	Mark Prior (7–4)	**Billy Wagner** (25)	37,882	57–52
110	August 5	Brewers	1–3 (10)	Ben Sheets (8–7)	**Geoff Geary** (1–1)	Matt Wise (1)	31,759	57–53
111	August 6	Brewers	8–2	**Jon Lieber** (10–10)	Chris Capuano (12–7)	None	35,800	58–53
112	August 7	Brewers	0–2	Tomo Ohka (7–6)	**Vicente Padilla** (5–11)	Derrick Turnbow (24)	35,017	58–54
113	August 9	@ Dodgers	8–4	**Ryan Madson** (5–4)	Steve Schmoll (2–1)	None	44,556	59–54
114	August 10	@ Dodgers	9–5	**Ugueth Urbina** (3–3)	Yhency Brazobán (2–7)	None	44,001	60–54
115	August 11	@ Dodgers	1–5	Odalis Pérez (7–6)	**Cory Lidle** (9–10)	None	44,963	60–55
116	August 12	@ Padres	3–2	**Jon Lieber** (11–10)	Jake Peavy (10–5)	**Billy Wagner** (26)	41,153	61–55
117	August 13	@ Padres	5–2	**Ugueth Urbina** (4–3)	Trevor Hoffman (1–5)	**Billy Wagner** (27)	37,777	62–55
118	August 14	@ Padres	8–3	**Robinson Tejeda** (3–2)	Chan Ho Park (9–6)	None	37,167	63–55
119	August 15	Nationals	3–6	Liván Hernández (14–5)	**Brett Myers** (10–6)	None	40,627	63–56
–	August 16	Nationals	Postponed (rain); Makeup: August 18 as a day-night double-header					
120	August 17	Nationals	4–3	**Jon Lieber** (12–10)	Esteban Loaiza (7–9)	**Billy Wagner** (28)	33,450	64–56
121	August 18 (1)	Nationals	2–1	**Vicente Padilla** (6–11)	Tony Armas (7–6)	**Billy Wagner** (29)	30,046	65–56
122	August 18 (2)	Nationals	4–5	Luis Ayala (8–6)	**Ugueth Urbina** (4–4)	Chad Cordero (39)	34,492	65–57
123	August 19	Pirates	2–11	Kip Wells (7–12)	**Robinson Tejeda** (3–3)	None	32,992	65–58
124	August 20	Pirates	6–1	**Brett Myers** (11–6)	Dave Williams (10–9)	None	43,192	66–58
125	August 21	Pirates	4–3	**Ryan Madson** (6–4)	Rick White (3–6)	**Billy Wagner** (30)	40,689	67–58
126	August 22	@ Giants	0–5	Noah Lowry (10–11)	**Jon Lieber** (12–11)	None	38,947	67–59
127	August 23	@ Giants	10–2	**Vicente Padilla** (7–11)	Brett Tomko (7–14)	None	37,892	68–59
128	August 24	@ Giants	7–4	**Robinson Tejeda** (4–3)	Brad Hennessey (4–6)	**Billy Wagner** (31)	36,812	69–59
129	August 26	@ Diamondbacks	11–3	**Aaron Fultz** (3–0)	Brad Halsey (8–11)	None	22,397	70–59
130	August 27	@ Diamondbacks	0–2	Brandon Webb (11–10)	**Jon Lieber** (12–12)	José Valverde (5)	26,903	70–60
131	August 28	@ Diamondbacks	5–10	Claudio Vargas (8–7)	**Vicente Padilla** (7–12)	None	31,112	70–61
132	August 30	@ Mets	4–6	Juan Padilla (1–0)	**Ugueth Urbina** (4–5)	Braden Looper (28)	36,505	70–62
133	August 31	@ Mets	8–2	**Brett Myers** (12–6)	Pedro Martínez (13–6)	None	43,780	71–62

September (15–12)

#	Date	Opponent	Score	Win	Loss	Save	Attendance	Record
134	September 1	@ Mets	3–1	**Jon Lieber** (13–12)	Tom Glavine (10–12)	**Billy Wagner** (32)	38,316	72–62
135	September 2	@ Nationals	7–1	**Vicente Padilla** (8–12)	John Halama (1–3)	None	28,939	73–62
136	September 3	@ Nationals	4–5 (12)	Héctor Carrasco (4–3)	**Aquilino López** (0–1)	None	30,561	73–63
137	September 4	@ Nationals	1–6	Esteban Loaiza (10–10)	**Gavin Floyd** (1–2)	None	32,251	73–64
138	September 5	Astros	3–4	Andy Pettitte (14–9)	**Brett Myers** (12–7)	Brad Lidge (33)	36,144	73–65
139	September 6	Astros	1–2	Roy Oswalt (17–11)	**Billy Wagner** (4–2)	Brad Lidge (34)	30,600	73–66
140	September 7	Astros	6–8	Chad Qualls (5–4)	**Billy Wagner** (4–3)	Brad Lidge (35)	29,026	73–67
141	September 9	Marlins	12–5	**Cory Lidle** (10–10)	A. J. Burnett (12–10)	None	32,933	74–67
142	September 10	Marlins	6–7	Chris Resop (1–0)	**Ryan Madson** (6–5)	Todd Jones (36)	40,479	74–68
143	September 11	Marlins	11–1	**Jon Lieber** (14–12)	Ismael Valdez (2–2)	None	34,794	75–68
144	September 12	Braves	4–1	**Eude Brito** (1–0)	Tim Hudson (12–8)	**Billy Wagner** (33)	21,169	76–68
145	September 13	Braves	5–4	**Aaron Fultz** (4–0)	Blaine Boyer (2–2)	**Billy Wagner** (34)	24,311	77–68
146	September 14	Braves	12–4	**Cory Lidle** (11–10)	Horacio Ramírez (11–9)	None		78–68
147	September 15	Braves	4–6	Jorge Sosa (12–3)	**Brett Myers** (12–8)	Kyle Farnsworth (13)	27,804	78–69
148	September 16	@ Marlins	13–3	**Jon Lieber** (15–12)	Jim Mecir (1–4)	None	30,853	79–69
149	September 17	@ Marlins	10–2	**Ugueth Urbina** (5–5)	Dontrelle Willis (21–9)	None	27,203	80–69
150	September 18	@ Marlins	1–7	Josh Beckett (15–8)	**Eude Brito** (1–1)	None	25,208	80–70
151	September 20	@ Braves	1–4	Jorge Sosa (13–3)	**Cory Lidle** (11–11)	None	25,701	80–71
152	September 21	@ Braves	10–6 (10)	**Geoff Geary** (2–1)	Kyle Davies (7–4)	None	27,030	81–71
153	September 22	@ Braves	4–0	**Jon Lieber** (16–12)	Tim Hudson (13–9)	None	26,301	82–71
154	September 23	@ Reds	11–10	**Rhéal Cormier** (4–2)	David Weathers (7–4)	**Billy Wagner** (35)	22,608	83–71
155	September 24	@ Reds	2–3	Eric Milton (8–14)	**Eude Brito** (1–2)	David Weathers (15)	31,632	83–72
156	September 25	@ Reds	6–3	**Cory Lidle** (12–11)	Randy Keisler (2–1)	**Billy Wagner** (36)	23,072	84–72
157	September 26	Mets	5–6	Shingo Takatsu (2–2)	**Ugueth Urbina** (5–6)	Roberto Hernández (3)	28,679	84–73
158	September 27	Mets	2–3	Juan Padilla (3–1)	**Jon Lieber** (16–13)	Aaron Heilman (4)	36,150	84–74
159	September 28	Mets	16–6	**Vicente Padilla** (9–12)	Steve Trachsel (1–4)	None	42,250	85–74
160	September 30	@ Nationals	4–3	**Cory Lidle** (13–11)	Liván Hernández (15–10)	**Billy Wagner** (37)	30,375	86–74

October (2–0)

#	Date	Opponent	Score	Win	Loss	Save	Attendance	Record
161	October 1	@ Nationals	8–4	**Brett Myers** (13–8)	John Patterson (9–7)	None	32,903	87–74
162	October 2	@ Nationals	9–3	**Jon Lieber** (17–13)	Héctor Carrasco (5–4)	**Billy Wagner** (38)	36,491	88–74

=== Roster ===
2005 Philadelphia Phillies
**Roster**
**Pitchers**: 51 Terry Adams; 58 Eude Brito; 37 Rhéal Cormier; 34 Gavin Floyd; 46 Aaron Fultz; 56 Geoff Geary; 30 Cory Lidle; 21 Jon Lieber; 48 Pedro Liriano; 33 Aquilino López; 63 Ryan Madson; 39 Brett Myers; 44 Vicente Padilla; 50 Robinson Tejeda; 57 Amaury Telemaco; 74 Ugueth Urbina; 13 Billy Wagner; 43 Randy Wolf; 38 Tim Worrell	**Catchers**: 24 Mike Lieberthal; 3 Todd Pratt; **Infielders**: 4 David Bell; 6 Ryan Howard; 27 Matt Kata; 12 Ramón Martínez; 33 José Offerman; 9 Tomás Pérez; 27 Plácido Polanco; 11 Jimmy Rollins; 29 Danny Sandoval; 25 Jim Thome; 26 Chase Utley	**Outfielders**: 53 Bobby Abreu; 5 Pat Burrell; 29 Marlon Byrd; 47 Endy Chávez; 7 Kenny Lofton; 22 Jason Michaels; 29 Michael Tucker; 8 Shane Victorino	**Manager**: 41 Charlie Manuel; **Coaches**: 23 Marc Bombard (first base); 16 Bill Dancy (third base); 28 Rich Dubee (pitching); 31 Ramon Henderson (bullpen); 15 Milt Thompson (hitting); 19 Gary Varsho (bench)

=== First Washington Nationals game ===
- On April 4, 2005, Brad Wilkerson (after being the last player to ever wear a Montreal Expo jersey) had the honor of being the first batter for the Washington Nationals and he promptly responded with the first hit in the new team's history. Nevertheless, Kenny Lofton hit a three-run homer and Jon Lieber pitched 5 2/3 effective innings, leading the home team Philadelphia Phillies to an 8–4 victory over the new Nationals at Citizens Bank Park. (Lieber was credited with the win for the Phillies and would also score a win for Philadelphia in the last game of the 2005 Nationals season.) Outfielder Terrmel Sledge hit the Nats' first home run in the April 4 contest.
  - Scorecard

Team	1	2	3	4	5	6	7	8	9	R	H	E
Washington	0	1	0	0	0	2	1	0	0	**4**	**13**	**1**
**Philadelphia**	0	2	1	0	4	0	1	0	x	**8**	**14**	**1**
W: Lieber (1–0) L: Hernandez (0–1)
HRs: Terrmel Sledge, Kenny Lofton Attendance: 44,080. Length of game: 3:19. Umpires: HP: Darling, 1B: Poncino, 2B: Wegner, 3B: Nauert

- On April 6, 2005, the Washington Nationals recorded their first-ever regular season win by beating the Phillies, 7–3. The win came in their second game of the season and was highlighted by Wilkerson's hit for the cycle.

== Player stats ==
=== Batting ===
==== Starters by position ====
Note: Pos= Position; G = Games played; AB = At bats; H = Hits; Avg. = Batting average; HR = Home runs; RBI = Runs batted in

Pos	Player	G	AB	H	Avg.	HR	RBI
C	Mike Lieberthal	118	392	103	.263	12	47
1B	Ryan Howard	88	312	90	.288	22	63
2B	Chase Utley	147	543	158	.291	28	105
SS	Jimmy Rollins	158	677	196	.290	12	54
3B	David Bell	150	557	138	.248	10	61
LF	Pat Burrell	154	562	158	.281	32	117
CF	Kenny Lofton	110	367	123	.335	2	36
RF	Bobby Abreu	162	588	168	.286	24	102

==== Other batters ====
Note: G = Games played; AB = At bats; H = Hits; Avg = Batting average; HR = Home runs; RBI = Runs batted in

Player	G	AB	H	Avg.	HR	RBI
Jason Michaels	105	289	88	.304	4	31
Jim Thome	59	193	40	.207	7	30
Todd Pratt	60	175	44	.251	7	23
Tomás Pérez	94	159	37	.233	0	22
Plácido Polanco	43	158	50	.316	3	20
Endy Chávez	91	107	23	.215	0	10
Ramón Martínez	33	56	16	.286	1	8
José Offerman	33	33	6	.182	1	3
Michael Tucker	22	18	4	.222	0	3
Shane Victorino	21	17	5	.294	2	8
Marlon Byrd	5	13	4	.308	0	0
Matt Kata	10	6	1	.167	0	0
Danny Sandoval	3	2	0	.000	0	0

=== Pitching ===
==== Starting pitchers ====
Note: G = Games pitched; IP = Innings pitched, W = Wins; L = Losses; ERA = Earned run average; SO = Strikeouts

Player	G	IP	W	L	ERA	SO
Jon Lieber	35	218.1	17	13	4.20	149
Brett Myers	34	215.1	13	8	3.72	208
Corey Lidle	31	184.2	13	11	4.53	121
Vicente Padilla	27	147.0	9	12	4.71	103
Randy Wolf	13	80.0	6	4	4.39	61

==== Other pitchers ====
Note: G = Games pitched; IP = Innings pitched; W = Wins; L = Losses; ERA = Earned run average; SO = Strikeouts

Player	G	IP	W	L	ERA	SO
Rob Tejeda	26	85.2	4	3	3.57	72
Gavin Floyd	7	26.0	1	2	10.04	17
Eude Brito	6	22.0	1	2	3.68	15

==== Relief pitchers ====
Note: G = Games pitched; W = Wins; L = Losses; SV = Saves; ERA = Earned run average; SO = Strikeouts

Player	G	W	L	SV	ERA	SO
Billy Wagner	75	4	3	38	1.51	87
Ryan Madson	78	6	5	0	4.14	79
Aaron Fultz	62	4	0	0	2.24	54
Rhéal Cormier	57	4	2	0	5.89	34
Ugueth Urbina	56	4	3	1	4.13	66
Geoff Geary	40	2	1	0	3.72	42
Tim Worrell	19	0	1	1	7.41	17
Terry Adams	16	0	2	0	12.33	4
Aquilino López	10	0	1	0	2.13	16
Amaury Telemaco	7	0	1	0	4.22	8
Pedro Liriano	5	0	0	0	10.57	6

== Farm system ==
Level	Team	League	Manager
AAA	Scranton/Wilkes-Barre; Red Barons	International League	Gene Lamont
AA	Reading Phillies	Eastern League	Steve Swisher
A	Clearwater Threshers	Florida State League	Greg Legg
A	Lakewood BlueClaws	South Atlantic League	P. J. Forbes
A-Short Season	Batavia Muckdogs	New York–Penn League	Manny Amador
Rookie	GCL Phillies	Gulf Coast League	Jim Morrison
