= Shoulder arthritis =

Clinical condition in the shoulder

Shoulder arthritis can be one of three types of arthritis in the glenohumeral joint of the shoulder. The glenohumeral joint is a ball and socket joint, which relies on cartilage to move smoothly and to operate normally.

== Forms ==
Shoulder arthritis is a clinical condition in which the joint that connects the ball of the arm bone (humeral head) to the shoulder blade socket (glenoid) has degenerated cartilage. Normally the ends of the bone are covered with hyaline articular cartilage, a surface so smooth that the friction at the joint is less than that of ice on ice. In arthritis, this cartilage is progressively lost, exposing the bone beneath. Shoulder arthritis is characterized by pain and stiffness, and often by a grinding (crepitation) on shoulder motion.

One of the three forms of shoulder arthritis is osteoarthritis. Osteoarthritis is the gradual degeneration of the joint cartilage that occurs predominantly in elderly people, and sometimes as the result of overuse in athletes. Post-traumatic arthritis develops after a notable trauma, such as a fracture or dislocation, damages the joint and cartilage. Rheumatoid arthritis is a disease where the body attacks its own cartilage. In each of these cases, cartilage is deteriorating.

== Symptoms ==
The main symptom of shoulder arthritis is pain. Pain usually occurs in the front of the shoulder and is worse with motion. People with shoulder arthritis will also experience gradual loss of movement (stiffness).

== Diagnosis ==
A diagnosis of glenohumeral osteoarthritis is based on limitation of passive movement and radiographs. Radiographs distinguish glenohumeral arthritis from adhesive capsulitis, which is also characterized by pain and limitation of passive motion. Passive motion is limitation of joint motion unrelated to effort, pain or problems with muscle, tendon, or nerve.

== Treatment ==
Treatment of shoulder arthritis is palliative (symptom-alleviating), not disease-modifying. usually aimed at reducing pain. There is no way to replace lost cartilage except through surgery. Pain medicines available over-the-counter can be prescribed by the doctor, but another form of treatment is cryotherapy, which is the use of cold compression. Some vitamin supplements have been found to prevent further deterioration; glucosamine sulfate is an effective preserver of cartilage. Another way to prevent the further loss of cartilage would be to maintain motion in the shoulder, because once it is lost, it's difficult to regain. Steps to reduce extreme pain in cases of bad shoulder arthritis can involve the doctor giving injections directly into the shoulder, usually consisting of a steroid mixed with an anesthetic, or even shoulder surgery.

For patients with severe shoulder arthritis that does not respond to non-operative treatment, shoulder surgery can be very helpful. Depending on the condition of the shoulder and the specific expectations of the patient, surgical options include total shoulder joint replacement arthroplasty , 'ream and run' (humeral hemiarthroplasty with non prosthetic glenoid arthroplasty , and reverse (Delta) total shoulder joint replacement arthroplasty . Research has shown similar outcomes after both reverse and anatomical total shoulder replacement. There is evidence that patients with high body mass index (BMI) do well with shoulder replacement surgery, and they do not have increased risks after surgery.
