= Ezequiel Astacio =

Dominican baseball player (born 1979)

- Pitcher
- Born: November 4, 1979 (age 45); Hato Mayor del Rey, Hato Mayor, Dominican Republic
- Batted: Right Threw: Right

MLB debut
- May 3, 2005, for the Houston Astros

Last MLB appearance
- May 10, 2006, for the Houston Astros

MLB statistics
- Win–loss record: 5–6
- Earned run average: 6.02
- Strikeouts: 72
- Stats at Baseball Reference

Teams
- Houston Astros (2005–2006)

Ezequiel Franklin Astacio (born November 4, 1979) is a Dominican former professional baseball pitcher. He played in Major League Baseball (MLB) for the Houston Astros.

== Career ==
=== Philadelphia Phillies ===
Astacio begin his professional career by signing with the Philadelphia Phillies in 2001. He was assigned to the GCL Phillies upon signing. In 2002, he was promoted to the Single-A Lakewood BlueClaws, where he would spend the entire season. In 2003, he was promoted to the advanced Single-A Clearwater Phillies, with whom he would spend the season with, playing in 25 games.

=== Houston Astros ===
On November 3, 2003, Astacio was traded to the Houston Astros along with Taylor Buchholz and Brandon Duckworth in exchange for Billy Wagner. He would spend the 2004 season with the Double-A Round Rock Express. Astacio got a taste of the big leagues in 2005 posting a 3–6 record with a 5.67 ERA. He pitched 100 innings, striking out 66 and walking 25. Typical of a lot of younger pitchers with a plus fastball, he also gave up an eye opening 25 home runs. He gave up the game-winning home run to Geoff Blum in Game 3 of the 2005 World Series against the Chicago White Sox.

=== Texas Rangers ===
Astacio was claimed off of waivers by the Texas Rangers on March 26, 2007, but he failed to make the team following spring training. After clearing waivers, Astacio was optioned to Triple-A Oklahoma RedHawks. He became a free agent on October 29, 2007.

=== Cincinnati Reds ===
On January 31, 2008, Astacio signed a minor league contract with the Cincinnati Reds organization. On June 28, 2008, Astacio was released before pitching in a game.

=== Chicago Cubs ===
On September 1, 2009, Astacio signed a minor league deal with the Chicago Cubs organization, and was assigned to the Triple-A Iowa Cubs. He played in 3 games for Iowa before being released on September 15.

=== San Angelo Colts ===
Astacio signed with the San Angelo Colts of United League Baseball for the 2010 season. He played in 21 games for San Angelo, pitching to a 5.85 ERA with 125 strikeouts. He became a free agent after the season.

=== Road Warriors ===
In 2011, Astacio signed with the Road Warriors of the Atlantic League of Professional Baseball. He was released after pitching to a 14.40 ERA over 5.0 innings of work.
