= Todd Self =

American baseball player

- First baseman / Outfielder
- Born: November 9, 1978 (age 46); Shreveport, Louisiana, U.S.
- Batted: Left Threw: Right

MLB debut
- May 12, 2005, for the Houston Astros

Last MLB appearance
- June 9, 2005, for the Houston Astros

MLB statistics
- Batting average: .200
- Home runs: 1
- Runs batted in: 4
- Stats at Baseball Reference

Teams
- Houston Astros (2005)

Todd Douglas Self (born November 9, 1978) is a former Major League Baseball first baseman/outfielder. He is 6'5 and weighs 225 pounds.

In 2008, he played for the Houston Astros' Double-A affiliate, the Corpus Christi Hooks. He became a free agent at the end of the season. In 2009, he played for the independent St. Paul Saints.
