= 2005 Atlanta Braves season =

2005 Atlanta Braves
- National League East champions
- League: National League
- Division: East
- Ballpark: Turner Field
- City: Atlanta
- Record: 90–72 (.556)
- Divisional place: 1st
- Owners: Time Warner
- General managers: John Schuerholz
- Managers: Bobby Cox
- Television: TBS Superstation; Turner South (Pete Van Wieren, Skip Caray, Don Sutton, Joe Simpson, Chip Caray); FSN South (Tom Paciorek, Bob Rathbun)
- Radio: WGST; WKLS (Pete Van Wieren, Skip Caray, Don Sutton, Joe Simpson, Chip Caray); WWWE (Luis Octavio Dozal, Jose Manuel Flores)

The 2005 Atlanta Braves season marked the franchise's 40th season in Atlanta and the 135th season overall. The Braves won their 11th consecutive division title under Manager of the Year Bobby Cox, finishing 2 games ahead of the second-place Philadelphia Phillies. The Braves lost the NLDS to the Houston Astros, 3–1.

Tim Hudson joined the Braves' rotation and rookies Jeff Francoeur, Kelly Johnson and Brian McCann had their first seasons with Atlanta in 2005.

== Offseason ==
- October 15, 2004: DeWayne Wise was selected off waivers by the Detroit Tigers from the Atlanta Braves.
- December 3, 2004: Julio Franco was resigned in free agency to the Atlanta Braves.
- December 11, 2004: Dan Kolb was acquired by the Atlanta Braves from the Milwaukee Brewers for a player to be named later and José Capellán. The Atlanta Braves sent Alec Zumwalt (minors) (December 14, 2004) to the Milwaukee Brewers to complete the trade.
- December 16, 2004: Ex-All-star Tim Hudson was traded by the Oakland Athletics to the Atlanta Braves for Juan Cruz, Dan Meyer, and Charles Thomas.
- January 14, 2005: Raúl Mondesí signed as a free agent with the Atlanta Braves.
- March 31, 2005: Jorge Sosa was traded by the Tampa Bay Devil Rays to the Atlanta Braves for Nick Green.

== Regular season ==
- On September 15, 2005, Andruw Jones hit his 300th career home run which went 430 feet (130 m) off Philadelphia Phillies reliever Geoff Geary in a 12–4 Phillies win. Jones became one of the quickest in Major League history to 300 home runs. The ball landed in the upper deck in left field at Citizens Bank Park.

=== Opening Day starters ===
Position	Name
Starting Pitcher	John Smoltz
Catcher	Johnny Estrada
First Baseman	Adam LaRoche
Second Baseman	Marcus Giles
Third Baseman	Chipper Jones
Shortstop	Rafael Furcal
Left Fielder	Brian Jordan
Center Fielder	Andruw Jones
Right Fielder	Raúl Mondesí

=== Season standings ===
==== National League East ====
NL East
Team	W	L	Pct.	GB	Home	Road
Atlanta Braves	90	72	.556	—	53‍–‍28	37‍–‍44
Philadelphia Phillies	88	74	.543	2	46‍–‍35	42‍–‍39
Florida Marlins	83	79	.512	7	45‍–‍36	38‍–‍43
New York Mets	83	79	.512	7	48‍–‍33	35‍–‍46
Washington Nationals	81	81	.500	9	41‍–‍40	40‍–‍41

==== Record vs. opponents ====
2005 National League record Source: MLB Standings Grid – 2005
Team	AZ	ATL	CHC	CIN	COL	FLA	HOU	LAD	MIL	NYM	PHI	PIT	SD	SF	STL	WAS	AL
Arizona	—	3–3	5–2	2–4	11–7	2–4	3–3	13–5	2–4	1–6	3–4	3–4	10–9	7–11	2–5	2–4	8–10
Atlanta	3–3	—	6–1	7–3	2–4	10–8	5–1	3–3	3–3	13–6	9–10	4–3	1–5	4–2	3–3	10–9	7–8
Chicago	2–5	1–6	—	6–9	4–3	5–4	9–7	4–2	7–9	2–4	2–4	11–5	4–3	5–2	10–6	1–5	6–9
Cincinnati	4–2	3–7	9–6	—	3–3	2–4	4–12	3–4	6–10	3–3	3–4	9–7	4–2	3–5	5–11	5–1	7-8
Colorado	7–11	4–2	3–4	3–3	—	3–3	1–5	11–8	1–5	3–4	2–4	3–7	7–11	7–11	4–4	2–4	6–9
Florida	4–2	8–10	4–5	4–2	3–3	—	4–3	5–2	3–4	8–10	9–10	3–4	2–4	4–2	3–4	9–9	10–5
Houston	3–3	1–5	7–9	12–4	5–1	3-4	—	4–2	10–5	5–5	6–0	9–7	4–3	3–4	5–11	5–2	7–8
Los Angeles	5–13	3–3	2–4	4–3	8–11	2–5	2–4	—	5–1	3–3	3–3	5–2	11–7	9–10	2–5	2–4	5–13
Milwaukee	4–2	3–3	9–7	10–6	5–1	4–3	5–10	1–5	—	3–3	4–5	9–7	3–4	4–3	5–11	4–4	8–7
New York	6–1	6–13	4–2	3–3	4–3	10–8	5–5	3–3	3–3	—	11–7	3–3	4–2	3–3	2–5	11–8	5–10
Philadelphia	4-3	10–9	4–2	4–3	4–2	10–9	0–6	3–3	5–4	7–11	—	4–3	6–0	5–1	4–2	11–8	7–8
Pittsburgh	4–3	3–4	5–11	7–9	7–3	4–3	7–9	2–5	7–9	3–3	3–4	—	3–4	2–4	4–12	1–5	5–7
San Diego	9–10	5–1	3–4	2–4	11–7	4–2	3–4	7–11	4–3	2–4	0–6	4–3	—	12–6	4–3	5–1	7–11
San Francisco	11–7	2–4	2–5	5–3	11–7	2–4	4–3	10–9	3–4	3–3	1–5	4–2	6–12	—	2–4	3–3	6–12
St. Louis	5–2	3–3	6–10	11–5	4–4	4-3	11–5	5–2	11–5	5–2	2–4	12–4	3–4	4–2	—	4–2	10–5
Washington	4–2	9–10	5–1	1–5	4–2	9-9	2–5	4–2	4–4	8–11	8–11	5–1	1–5	3–3	2–4	—	12–6

=== Notable transactions ===
- April 15, 2005: John Foster signed as a free agent with the Atlanta Braves.
- June 1, 2005: Raúl Mondesí was released by the Atlanta Braves.
- July 31, 2005: Traded by the Detroit Tigers to the Atlanta Braves for Román Colón and Zach Miner.
- August 29, 2005: Todd Hollandsworth was traded by the Chicago Cubs to the Atlanta Braves for Angelo Burrows (minors) and Todd Blackford (minors).
- Notable picks in the 2005 Draft include Joey Devine (26th pick overall), Yunel Escobar (2nd round), and Jordan Schafer (3rd round).

=== Roster ===
2005 Atlanta Braves
**Roster**
**Pitchers**: 50 Adam Bernero; 48 Blaine Boyer; 27 Frank Brooks; 38 Jim Brower; 48 Matt Childers; 40 Román Colón; 26 Kyle Davies; 28 Joey Devine; 40 Kyle Farnsworth; 46 John Foster; 48 Seth Greisinger; 49 Kevin Gryboski; 32 Mike Hampton; 15 Tim Hudson; 36 Chuck James; 51 Dan Kolb; 50 Anthony Lerew; 38 Tom Martin; 49 Macay McBride; 43 Jay Powell; 30 Horacio Ramírez; 37 Chris Reitsma; 29 John Smoltz; 34 Jorge Sosa; 52 John Thomson; 36 Jorge Vásquez	**Catchers**: 23 Johnny Estrada; 16 Brian McCann; 8 Brayan Peña; 12 Eddie Pérez; **Infielders**: 24 Wilson Betemit; 14 Julio Franco; 1 Rafael Furcal; 22 Marcus Giles; 10 Chipper Jones; 19 Adam LaRoche; 11 Andy Marte; 4 Pete Orr	**Outfielders**: 7 Jeff Francoeur; 20 Todd Hollandsworth; 27 Kelly Johnson; 25 Andruw Jones; 33 Brian Jordan; 18 Ryan Langerhans; 43 Raúl Mondesí	**Manager**: 6 Bobby Cox; **Coaches**: 39 Pat Corrales (bench); 53 Bobby Dews (bullpen); 45 Fredi González (third base); 17 Glenn Hubbard (first base); 54 Leo Mazzone (pitching); 9 Terry Pendleton (hitting)

=== Game log ===
2005 Game Log: 90–72 (Home: 53–28; Away: 37–44)
April: 14–10 (Home: 7–4; Away: 7–6)

#	Date	Opponent	Score	Win	Loss	Save	Attendance	Record
1	April 5	@ Marlins	0–9	Beckett (1–0)	**Smoltz** (0–1)	—	57,405	0–1
2	April 6	@ Marlins	2–1 (13)	**Bernero** (1–0)	Bump (0–1)	**Kolb** (1)	20,317	1–1
3	April 7	@ Marlins	4–2	**Hudson** (1–0)	Burnett (0–1)	**Kolb** (2)	19,108	2–1
4	April 8	Mets	3–1	**Thomson** (1–0)	Zambrano (0–1)	**Kolb** (3)	50,939	3–1
5	April 9	Mets	6–3	**Bernero** (2–0)	Heilman (0–1)	—	40,604	4–1
6	April 10	Mets	1–6	Martinez (1–0)	**Smoltz** (0–2)	—	36,601	4–2
7	April 11	Nationals	11–2	**Hampton** (1–0)	Day (0–1)	—	16,584	5–2
8	April 12	Nationals	3–4	Ayala (1–0)	**Kolb** (0–1)	Cordero (1)	20,122	5–3
9	April 13	Nationals	4–11	Ohka (1–1)	**Thomson** (1–1)	—	19,093	5–4
10	April 15	@ Phillies	11–4	**Ramirez** (1–0)	Floyd (1–1)	—	31,408	6–4
11	April 16	@ Phillies	1–2	Lieber (3–0)	**Smoltz** (0–3)	Wagner (2)	36,820	6–5
12	April 17	@ Phillies	1–2 (10)	Madson (1–1)	**Kolb** (0–2)	—	32,008	6–6
13	April 18	@ Astros	1–0 (12)	**Sosa** (1–0)	Wheeler (0–2)	**Kolb** (4)	31,672	7–6
14	April 19	@ Astros	3–5	Backe (1–0)	**Thomson** (1–2)	Lidge (4)	32,146	7–7
15	April 20	@ Nationals	0–2	Day (1–1)	**Ramirez** (1–1)	Cordero (3)	27,374	7–8
16	April 21	@ Nationals	2–1	**Reitsma** (1–0)	Cordero (2–1)	**Kolb** (5)	30,728	8–8
17	April 22	Phillies	6–2	**Hampton** (2–0)	Myers (1–1)	**Kolb** (6)	26,837	9–8
18	April 23	Phillies	11–1	**Hudson** (2–0)	Wolf (1–2)	—	31,656	10–8
19	April 24	Phillies	4–0	**Thomson** (2–2)	Padilla (0–2)	—	26,713	11–8
20	April 25	@ Mets	4–5	Heilman (2–2)	**Ramirez** (1–2)	Looper (3)	16,874	11–9
21	April 26	@ Mets	4–3	**Smoltz** (1–3)	Martinez (2–1)	**Foster** (1)	31,511	12–9
22	April 27	@ Mets	8–4	**Hampton** (3–0)	Glavine (1–3)	—	21,087	13–9
23	April 29	Cardinals	5–6	Mulder (3–1)	**Hudson** (2–1)	Reyes (1)	33,833	13–10
24	April 30	Cardinals	3–2	**Kolb** (1–2)	Journell (0–1)	—	35,789	14–10

May: 14–13 (Home: 10–3; Away: 4–10)

#	Date	Opponent	Score	Win	Loss	Save	Attendance	Record
25	May 1	Cardinals	2–1	**Smoltz** (2–3)	Suppan (2–3)	**Kolb** (7)	34,304	15–10
26	May 3	Marlins	6–11	Leiter (1–2)	**Hampton** (3–1)	—	22,299	15–11
27	May 4	Marlins	5–2	**Hudson** (3–1)	Burnett (3–2)	**Kolb** (8)	25,082	16–11
28	May 5	Astros	9–3	**Thomson** (3–2)	Backe (2–2)	—	20,553	17–11
29	May 6	Astros	9–4	**Smoltz** (3–3)	Oswalt (4–3)	—	26,987	19–11
30	May 7	Astros	4–1	**Ramirez** (2–2)	Pettitte (2–3)	**Kolb** (9)	36,452	19–11
31	May 8	Astros	16–0	**Hampton** (4–1)	Astacio (0–1)	—	32,498	20–11
32	May 9	@ Rockies	6–7	Wright (2–2)	**Hudson** (3–2)	Tsao (3)	20,307	20–12
33	May 10	@ Rockies	9–5	**Sosa** (2–0)	Jennings (1–4)	—	20,415	21–12
34	May 11	@ Rockies	5–6	Tsao (1–0)	**Kolb** (1–3)	—	19,631	21–13
35	May 13	@ Dodgers	4–7	Carrara (4–0)	**Reitsma** (1–1)	Brazoban (11)	53,689	21–14
36	May 14	@ Dodgers	5–1	**Bernero** (3–0)	Perez (4–4)	—	49,112	22–14
37	May 15	@ Dodgers	5–2	**Hudson** (4–2)	Alvarez (1–1)	**Kolb** (10)	53,239	23–14
38	May 16	@ Padres	3–5	Linebrink (1–1)	**Reitsma** (1–2)	Hoffman (12)	25,958	23–15
39	May 17	@ Padres	2–3	Reyes (2–0)	**Kolb** (1–4)	—	31,330	23–16
40	May 18	@ Padres	4–8	Eaton (6–1)	**Ramirez** (2–3)	Hoffman (13)	31,670	23–17
41	May 20	@ Red Sox	3–4	Miller (1–0)	**Hudson** (4–3)	Foulke (11)	35,332	23–18
42	May 21	@ Red Sox	7–5	**Davies** (1–0)	Wakefield (4–3)	—	35,008	24–18
43	May 22	@ Red Sox	2–5	Clement (5–0)	**Colon** (0–1)	—	34,844	24–19
44	May 23	Mets	8–6	**Ramirez** (3–3)	Ishii (0–3)	**Kolb** (11)	26,132	25–19
45	May 24	Mets	4–0	**Hudson** (5–3)	Glavine (3–5)	—	28,927	26–19
46	May 25	Mets	3–0	**Davies** (2–0)	Zambrano (2–5)	**Reitsma** (1)	33,250	27–19
47	May 27	Phillies	1–5	Lidle (5–3)	**Smoltz** (3–4)	—	31,501	27–20
48	May 28	Phillies	5–12	Lieber (6–4)	**Ramirez** (3–4)	—	34,975	27–21
49	May 29	Phillies	7–2	**Hudson** (6–3)	Myers (4–3)	—	37,615	28–21
50	May 30	@ Nationals	2–3	Ohka (4–3)	**Davies** (2–1)	Cordero (12)	39,705	28–22
51	May 31	@ Nationals	4–5	Ayala (3–3)	**Colon** (0–2)	Cordero (13)	29,512	28–23

June: 15–13 (Home: 7–5; Away: 8–8)

#	Date	Opponent	Score	Win	Loss	Save	Attendance	Record
52	June 1	@ Nationals	5–4	**Smoltz** (4–4)	Carrasco (1–1)	**Reitsma** (2)	28,280	29–23
53	June 2	@ Nationals	6–8	Carrasco (2–1)	**Kolb** (1–5)	Cordero (14)	29,225	29–24
54	June 3	@ Pirates	1–3	Wells (4–4)	**Hudson** (6–4)	Mesa (15)	27,643	29–25
55	June 4	@ Pirates	1–0	**Foster** (1–0)	Gonzalez (0–2)	**Reitsma** (3)	33,649	30–25
56	June 5	@ Pirates	2–5	Perez (4–4)	**Bernero** (3–1)	Mesa (16)	28,717	30–26
57	June 6	Angels	2–4	Donnelly (3–1)	**Smoltz** (4–5)	Rodriguez (11)	23,104	30–27
58	June 7	Angels	3–2	**Ramirez** (4–4)	Byrd (5–5)	**Reitsma** (4)	25,276	31–27
59	June 8	Angels	4–8	Donnelly (4–1)	**Foster** (1–1)	—	27,747	31–28
60	June 10	Athletics	4–6	Haren (4–7)	**Colon** (0–3)	Street (3)	28,535	31–29
61	June 11	Athletics	5–3	**Smoltz** (5–5)	Duchscherer (2–1)	—	36,004	31–30
62	June 12	Athletics	5–11	Zito (3–7)	**Boyer** (0–1)	—	27,819	32–30
63	June 13	@ Rangers	3–7	Young (6–3)	**Hudson** (6–5)	—	41,594	32–31
64	June 14	@ Rangers	7–2	**Sosa** (3–0)	Astacio (2–8)	—	30,221	32–31
65	June 15	@ Rangers	5–9	Park (7–1)	**Davies** (2–2)	Cordero (17)	33,663	33–32
66	June 16	@ Reds	5–2	**Smoltz** (6–5)	Claussen (3–4)	**Reitsma** (5)	23,362	34–32
67	June 17	@ Reds	10–5	**Ramirez** (5–4)	Ortiz (2–5)	—	27,023	35–32
68	June 18	@ Reds	6–1	**Bernero** (4–1)	Milton (3–9)	—	41,737	36–32
69	June 19	@ Reds	8–11	Weathers (4–0)	**Bernero** (4–2)	—	28,836	36–33
70	June 21	Marlins	5–0	**Smoltz** (7–5)	Burnett (4–5)	—	28,686	37–33
71	June 22	Marlins	8–0	**Ramirez** (6–4)	Moehler (2–5)	—	30,216	38–33
72	June 23	Marlins	0–8	Willis (12–2)	**Sosa** (3–1)	—	29,826	38–34
73	June 24	Orioles	7–5	**Davies** (3–2)	Penn (2–1)	**Reitsma** (6)	43,822	39–34
74	June 25	Orioles	5–4	**Vasquez** (1–0)	Williams (4–4)	—	44,106	40–34
75	June 26	Orioles	8–1	**Smoltz** (8–5)	Lopez (7–3)	—	37,157	41–34
76	June 27	@ Marlins	7–2 (8)	**Ramirez** (7–4)	Moehler (2–6)	—	16,341	42–34
77	June 28	@ Marlins	9–1	**Sosa** (4–1)	Willis (12–3)	—	20,129	43–34
78	June 29	@ Marlins	5–6 (13)	Riedling (4–1)	**Bernero** (4–3)	—	23,512	43–35
79	June 30	@ Marlins	2–6	Beckett (8–5)	**Colon** (0–4)	—	23,147	43–36

July: 18–8 (Home: 11–2; Away: 7–6)

#	Date	Opponent	Score	Win	Loss	Save	Attendance	Record
80	July 1	@ Phillies	9–1	**Smoltz** (9–5)	Padilla (3–8)	—	45,004	44–36
81	July 2	@ Phillies	3–6	Myers (6–4)	**Ramirez** (7–5)	Wagner (20)	29,205	44–37
82	July 3	@ Phillies	4–3	**Brower** (3–1)	Wagner (1–1)	**Reitsma** (7)	39,732	45–37
83	July 4	Cubs	4–0	**Davies** (4–2)	Wood (1–2)	—	52,274	46–37
84	July 4	Cubs	5–1	**Colon** (1–4)	Maddux (7–6)	—	34,698	47–37
–	July 6	Cubs	Postponed (rain); rescheduled for July 7					
85	July 7 (1)	Cubs	6–0	**Ramirez** (8–5)	Prior (5–3)	—	32,711	48–37
86	July 7 (2)	Cubs	9–4	**Foster** (2–1)	Novoa (2–2)	—	34,847	49–37
87	July 8	Brewers	2–1	**Kolb** (2–5)	Santana (1–3)	—	29,402	50–37
88	July 9	Brewers	6–9	Sheets (5–6)	**Davies** (4–3)	—	40,514	50–38
89	July 10	Brewers	4–8	Capuano (10–6)	**Colon** (1–5)	—	24,916	50–39
**76th All-Star Game in Detroit, Michigan**
90	July 14	@ Mets	3–6	Hernandez (5–2)	**Brower** (3–2)	Looper (21)	43,319	50–40
91	July 15	@ Mets	2–1	**Smoltz** (10–5)	Hernandez (5–3)	**Reitsma** (8)	34,444	51–40
92	July 16	@ Mets	3–0	**Hudson** (7–5)	Zambrano (4–8)	**Reitsma** (9)	36,078	52–40
93	July 17	@ Mets	1–8	Martinez (11–3)	**Hampton** (4–2)	—	34,983	52–41
94	July 18	@ Giants	6–1	**Sosa** (5–1)	Correia (1–1)	—	42,277	53–41
95	July 19	@ Giants	4–5	Walker (3–2)	**Kolb** (2–6)	—	42,494	53–42
96	July 20	@ Giants	4–1	**Smoltz** (11–5)	Lowry (6–10)	**Reitsma** (10)	42,371	54–42
97	July 22	@ Diamondbacks	5–6 (10)	Cormier (6–1)	**Brower** (3–3)	—	27,348	54–43
98	July 23	@ Diamondbacks	3–2	**Reitsma** (2–2)	Valverde (1–4)	—	32,673	55–43
99	July 24	@ Diamondbacks	2–3	Vazquez (9–9)	**Ramirez** (8–6)	Bruney (11)	30,280	55–44
100	July 26	Nationals	3–2 (10)	**Reitsma** (3–2)	Stanton (1–3)	—	43,308	56–44
101	July 27	Nationals	4–3	**Kolb** (3–6)	Majewski (2–2)	**Reitsma** (11)	40,625	57–44
102	July 28	Nationals	5–4	**Sosa** (6–1)	Drese (7–10)	**Reitsma** (12)	40,269	58–44
103	July 29	Pirates	2–1	**Ramirez** (9–6)	Williams (8–8)	**McBride** (1)	36,767	59–44
104	July 30	Pirates	9–6	**Davies** (5–3)	Redman (5–11)	**Reitsma** (13)	47,441	60–44
105	July 31	Pirates	5–4	**Smoltz** (12–5)	Grabow (2–1)	**Reitsma** (14)	33.275	61–44

August: 14–14 (Home: 7–9; Away: 7–5)

#	Date	Opponent	Score	Win	Loss	Save	Attendance	Record
106	August 1	Pirates	1–4	Duke (4–0)	**Hudson** (7–6)	Mesa (26)	25,875	61–45
107	August 2	@ Reds	12–2	**Sosa** (7–1)	Ortiz (6–7)	—	25,680	62–45
108	August 3	@ Reds	5–8	Claussen (6–8)	**Ramirez** (9–7)	Mercker (3)	37,157	62–46
109	August 4	@ Reds	7–4	**Davies** (6–3)	Harang (7–10)	**Reitsma** (15)	23,285	63–46
110	August 5	@ Cardinals	3–11	Mulder (13–5)	**Smoltz** (12–6)	—	47,838	63–47
111	August 6	@ Cardinals	8–1	**Hudson** (8–6)	Marquis (9–10)	—	48,565	64–47
112	August 7	@ Cardinals	3–5	King (3–2)	**Reitsma** (3–3)	—	47,714	64–48
113	August 9	Giants	7–1	**Ramirez** (10–7)	Hennessey (4–4)	—	27,230	65–48
114	August 10	Giants	5–4 (12)	**Boyer** (1–1)	Cooper (0–1)	—	24,032	66–48
115	August 11	Giants	3–5	Schmidt (9–6)	**Hudson** (8–7)	Walker (20)	26,577	66–49
116	August 12	Diamondbacks	0–8	Vargas (6–6)	**Sosa** (7–2)	—	32,006	66–50
117	August 13	Diamondbacks	9–5	**Foster** (3–1)	Cormier (7–3)	—	36,817	67–50
118	August 14	Diamondbacks	13–8	**Hampton** (5–2)	Vazquez (9–12)	—	30,098	68–50
119	August 16	Dodgers	4–6	Carrara (7–4)	**Reitsma** (3–4)	Sanchez (1)	24,692	68–51
120	August 17	Dodgers	10–2	**Hudson** (9–7)	Perez (7–7)	—	23,028	69–51
121	August 18	Dodgers	4–7	Weaver (11–8)	**Thomson** (3–3)	Sanchez (2)	24,101	69–52
122	August 19	Padres	7–12	Park (10–6)	**Hampton** (5–3)	—	35,071	69–53
123	August 20	Padres	2–7 (13)	Seanez (5–1)	**Devine** (0–1)	—	37,133	69–54
124	August 21	Padres	6–2	**Sosa** (8–2)	Otsuka (1–5)	—	26,077	70–54
125	August 22	@ Cubs	4–2	**Hudson** (10–7)	Wood (3–4)	—	38,767	71–54
126	August 23	@ Cubs	1–10	Williams (4–6)	**Thomson** (3–4)	—	38,273	71–55
127	August 24	@ Cubs	3–1	**Sosa** (9–2)	Prior (9–5)	**Farnsworth** (7)	38,033	72–55
128	August 26	@ Brewers	1–3	Sheets (10–9)	**Ramirez** (10–8)	Turnbow (29)	30,670	72–56
129	August 27	@ Brewers	8–4	**Smoltz** (13–6)	Santos (4–13)	—	42,464	73–56
130	August 28	@ Brewers	5–2	**Hudson** (11–7)	Capuano (14–9)	—	35,060	74–56
–	August 29	Nationals	Postponed (rain); rescheduled for August 31					
131	August 30	Nationals	2–3	Bergmann (1–0)	**Sosa** (9–3)	Cordero (42)	20,001	74–57
132	August 31 (1)	Nationals	5–3	**Ramirez** (11–8)	Loaiza (9–10)	**Farnsworth** (8)	N/A	75–57
133	August 31 (2)	Nationals	3–4	Stanton (2–3)	**Reitsma** (3–5)	Cordero (43)	25,555	75–58

September/October: 15–14 (Home: 11–5; Away: 4–9)

#	Date	Opponent	Score	Win	Loss	Save	Attendance	Record
134	September 1	Nationals	8–7 (10)	**Davies** (7–3)	Ayala (8–7)	—	19,053	76–58
135	September 2	Reds	7–4	**Hudson** (12–7)	Milton (7–13)	**Farnsworth** (9)	27,041	77–58
136	September 3	Reds	9–3	**Sosa** (10–3)	Hudson (6–7)	—	40,212	78–58
137	September 4	Reds	3–8 (12)	Belisle (3–6)	**Kolb** (3–7)	—	34,472	78–59
138	September 5	Mets	4–2	**Boyer** (2–1)	Trachsel (1–1)	**Farnsworth** (10)	33,045	79–59
139	September 6	Mets	3–1	**Smoltz** (14–6)	Martinez (13–7)	**Farnsworth** (11)	21,068	80–59
140	September 7	Mets	4–3 (10)	**Foster** (4–1)	Looper (4–7)	—	28,564	81–59
141	September 9	@ Nationals	6–8	Majewski (3–3)	**Foster** (4–2)	Cordero (44)	36,295	81–60
142	September 10	@ Nationals	4–0	**Sosa** (11–3)	Hernandez (15–7)	—	44,083	82–60
143	September 11	@ Nationals	9–7	**McBride** (1–0)	Cordero (2–4)	**Farnsworth** (12)	31,834	83–60
144	September 12	@ Phillies	1–4	Brito (1–0)	**Hudson** (12–8)	Wagner (33)	21,169	83–61
145	September 13	@ Phillies	4–5	Fultz (4–0)	**Boyer** (2–2)	Wagner (34)	24,311	83–62
146	September 14	@ Phillies	4–12	Lidle (11–10)	**Ramirez** (11–9)	—	23,125	83–63
147	September 15	@ Phillies	6–4	**Sosa** (12–3)	Myers (12–8)	**Farnsworth** (13)	27,804	84–63
148	September 16	@ Mets	0–4	Martinez (15–7)	**Smoltz** (14–7)	—	37,519	84–64
149	September 17	@ Mets	7–4	**Hudson** (13–8)	Trachsel (1–3)	**Farnsworth** (14)	34,191	85–64
150	September 18	@ Mets	1–4	Glavine (11–13)	**Thomson** (3–5)	—	31,703	85–65
151	September 20	Phillies	4–1	**Sosa** (13–3)	Lidle (11–11)	—	25,701	86–65
152	September 21	Phillies	6–10 (10)	Geary (2–1)	**Davies** (7–4)	—	27,030	86–66
153	September 22	Phillies	0–4	Lieber (16–12)	**Hudson** (13–9)	—	26,301	86–67
154	September 23	Marlins	4–3	**Boyer** (3–2)	Jones (1–5)	**Farnsworth** (15)	39,076	87–67
155	September 24	Marlins	6–1	**Thomson** (4–5)	Moehler (6–11)	—	51,775	88–67
156	September 25	Marlins	5–3	**Boyer** (4–2)	Burnett (12–12)	**Farnsworth** (16)	48,147	89–67
157	September 26	Rockies	5–6	Speier (2–1)	**Reitsma** (3–6)	Fuentes (31)	23,788	89–68
158	September 27	Rockies	12–3	**Hudson** (14–9)	Cook (6–2)	—	25,306	90–68
159	September 28	Rockies	5–10	Francis (14–12)	**Davies** (7–5)	—	29,971	90–69
160	September 30	@ Marlins	2–5	Villone (4–5)	**Thomson** (4–6)	Jones (39)	25,461	90–70
161	October 1	@ Marlins	4–6	Resop (2–0)	**Kolb** (3–8)	Jones (40)	28,392	90–71
162	October 2	@ Marlins	6–7 (10)	Villone (5–5)	**Davies** (7–6)	—	29,214	90–72

Legend: = Win = Loss
Bold = Braves team member

== Player stats ==
=== Batting ===
==== Starters by position ====
Note: Pos= Position; G = Games played; AB = At bats; H = Hits; Avg. = Batting average; HR = Home runs; RBI = Runs batted in

Pos	Player	G	AB	H	Avg.	HR	RBI
C	Johnny Estrada	105	357	93	.261	4	39
1B	Adam LaRoche	141	451	117	.259	20	78
2B	Marcus Giles	152	577	168	.291	15	63
SS	Rafael Furcal	154	616	175	.284	12	58
3B	Chipper Jones	109	358	106	.296	21	72
LF	Kelly Johnson	87	290	70	.241	9	40
CF	Andruw Jones	160	586	154	.263	51	128
RF	Jeff Francoeur	70	257	77	.300	14	45

==== Other batters ====
Note: G = Games played; AB = At bats; H = Hits; Avg. = Batting average; HR = Home runs; RBI = Runs batted in

Player	G	AB	H	Avg.	HR	RBI
Ryan Langerhans	128	326	87	.267	8	42
Wilson Betemit	115	246	75	.305	4	20
Julio Franco	108	233	64	.275	9	42
Brian Jordan	76	231	57	.247	3	24
Brian McCann	59	180	50	.278	5	23
Pete Orr	112	150	45	.300	1	8
Raúl Mondesí	41	142	30	.211	4	17
Andy Marte	24	57	8	.140	0	4
Brayan Peña	18	39	7	.179	0	4
Eddie Pérez	16	38	5	.211	2	6
Todd Hollandsworth	24	35	6	.171	1	1

=== Starting pitchers ===
Note: G = Games pitched; IP = Innings pitched; W = Wins; L = Losses; ERA = Earned run average; SO = Strikeouts

Player	G	IP	W	L	ERA	SO
John Smoltz	33	229.2	14	7	3.06	169
Horacio Ramírez	33	202.1	11	9	4.63	80
Tim Hudson	29	192.0	14	9	3.52	115
John Thomson	17	98.2	4	6	4.47	61
Mike Hampton	12	69.1	5	3	3.50	27
Seth Greisinger	1	5.0	0	0	3.60	2

==== Other pitchers ====
Note: G = Games pitched; IP = Innings pitched; W = Wins; L = Losses; ERA = Earned run average; SO = Strikeouts

Player	G	IP	W	L	ERA	SO
Jorge Sosa	44	134.0	13	3	2.55	85
Kyle Davies	21	87.2	7	6	4.93	62
Román Colón	23	44.1	1	5	5.28	30

===== Relief pitchers =====
Note: G = Games pitched; W = Wins; L = Losses; SV = Saves; ERA = Earned run average; SO = Strikeouts

Player	G	W	L	SV	ERA	SO
Chris Reitsma	76	3	6	15	3.93	42
Danny Kolb	65	3	8	11	5.93	39
John Foster	62	4	2	1	4.15	32
Blaine Boyer	43	4	2	0	3.11	33
Jim Brower	37	1	2	0	4.20	28
Adam Bernero	36	4	3	0	6.51	37
Kevin Gryboski	31	0	0	0	2.98	8
Kyle Farnsworth	26	0	0	10	1.98	32
Macay McBride	23	1	0	1	5.79	22
Jorge Vásquez	7	1	0	0	3.00	9
Anthony Lerew	7	0	0	0	5.63	5
Joey Devine	5	0	1	0	12.60	3
Jay Powell	5	0	0	0	0.00	1
Tom Martin	4	0	0	0	19.29	0
Matt Childers	3	0	0	0	4.50	2
Chuck James	2	0	0	0	1.59	5
Frank Brooks	1	0	0	0	0.00	0

== Postseason ==
=== Game log ===
2005 Postseason Game Log: 1–3 (Home: 1–1; Road: 0–2)
National League Division Series: 1–3 (Home: 1–1; Road: 0–2)

#	Date	Opponent	Score	Win	Loss	Save	Attendance	Record
1	October 5	Astros	5–10	Pettitte (1–0)	Hudson (0–1)	—	40,590	0–1
2	October 6	Astros	7–1	Smoltz (1–0)	Clemens (0–1)	—	46,181	1–1
3	October 8	@ Astros	3–7	Oswalt (1–0)	Sosa (0–1)	—	43,759	1–2
4	October 9	@ Astros	6–7 (18)	Clemens (1–1)	Devine (0–1)	—	43,413	1–3

== Awards and honors ==
2005 Major League Baseball season

- Bobby Cox was voted the National League Manager of the Year for the second consecutive year and 3rd time in total.
- John Smoltz was chosen to receive the Roberto Clemente Award. With this honor included, Smoltz became the only player in MLB history to win a Cy Young, and reliever of the year award.
- Andruw Jones led the National League in home runs and runs batted in. He was the recipient of a Gold Glove, Silver Slugger, and the Hank Aaron Award. Jones also finished second in voting for National League Most Valuable Player.
- Jeff Francoeur finished third in voting for National League Rookie of the Year.

2005 Major League Baseball All-Star Game

Andruw Jones and John Smoltz represented the Atlanta Braves in the 2005 All Star Game. Jones hit a home run and Smoltz took the loss in the game.

== Farm system ==
Level	Team	League	Manager
AAA	Richmond Braves	International League	Pat Kelly
AA	Mississippi Braves	Southern League	Brian Snitker
A	Myrtle Beach Pelicans	Carolina League	Randy Ingle
A	Rome Braves	South Atlantic League	Rocket Wheeler
Rookie	Danville Braves	Appalachian League	Paul Runge
Rookie	GCL Braves	Gulf Coast League	Luis Ortiz
