= 2005 National League Division Series =

American baseball games

Teams
Team (Wins)		Manager	Season
St. Louis Cardinals (3)		Tony La Russa	100–62 (.617), GA: 11
San Diego Padres (0)		Bruce Bochy	82–80 (.506), GA: 5
- Dates: October 4–8
- Television: ESPN (Games 1, 3); ESPN2 (Game 2)
- TV announcers: Jon Miller, Joe Morgan, and Gary Miller (Games 1, 3); Dave O'Brien, Steve Phillips, Eric Karros, and Duke Castiglione (Game 2)
- Radio: ESPN
- Radio announcers: Gary Cohen and Luis Gonzalez
- Umpires: Ed Montague, Bill Hohn, Bruce Dreckman, Jerry Layne, Ángel Hernández, Tim Timmons

Teams
Team (Wins)		Manager	Season
Houston Astros (3)		Phil Garner	89–73 (.549), GB: 11
Atlanta Braves (1)		Bobby Cox	90–72 (.556), GA: 2
- Dates: October 5–9
- Television: ESPN (Games 1, 4); Fox (Games 2–3)
- TV announcers: Dave O'Brien, Steve Phillips, and Eric Karros (Game 1); Thom Brennaman and Steve Lyons (Game 2); Josh Lewin and Steve Lyons (Game 3); Dave O'Brien, Rick Sutcliffe, and Erin Andrews (Game 4)
- Radio: ESPN
- Radio announcers: Jim Durham and John Franco
- Umpires: Joe Brinkman, Marvin Hudson, Jeff Nelson, Gary Cederstrom, Eric Cooper, Sam Holbrook

The 2005 National League Division Series (NLDS) consisted of two best-of-five playoff series on the National League side in Major League Baseball’s (MLB) 2005 postseason, began on Tuesday, October 4, and ended on Sunday, October 9, with the champions of the three NL divisions—along with a "wild card" team—participating in two series.

Under MLB's playoff format, no two teams from the same division were matched up in the Division Series, regardless of whether their records would normally indicate such a matchup. Home field advantage went to the team with the better regular-season record with the exception of the wild card team, which defers home field advantage regardless of record. The matchups were:

- (1) St. Louis Cardinals (NL Central champions) vs. (3) San Diego Padres (NL West champions): Cardinals won the series, 3–0.
- (2) Atlanta Braves (NL East champions) vs. (4) Houston Astros (Wild Card qualifier): Astros won the series, 3–1.

The higher seeded team in each series hosts Games 1, 2, and 5 (if necessary), and the lower seeded team hosts Games 3 and 4 (if necessary).

The Cardinals and Astros went on to meet in the NL Championship Series (NLCS). The Astros became the National League champion, and lost to the American League champion Chicago White Sox in the 2005 World Series.

== Matchups ==
=== St. Louis Cardinals vs. San Diego Padres ===
St. Louis won the series, 3–0.

Game	Date	Score	Location	Time	Attendance
1	October 4	San Diego Padres – 5, St. Louis Cardinals – 8	Busch Stadium (II)	2:57	52,349
2	October 6	San Diego Padres – 2, St. Louis Cardinals – 6	Busch Stadium (II)	2:54	52,599
3	October 8	St. Louis Cardinals – 7, San Diego Padres – 4	Petco Park	3:07	45,093

=== Atlanta Braves vs. Houston Astros ===
Houston won the series, 3–1.

Game	Date	Score	Location	Time	Attendance
1	October 5	Houston Astros – 10, Atlanta Braves – 5	Turner Field	3:11	40,590
2	October 6	Houston Astros – 1, Atlanta Braves – 7	Turner Field	2:52	46,181
3	October 8	Atlanta Braves – 3, Houston Astros – 7	Minute Maid Park	2:50	43,759
4	October 9	Atlanta Braves – 6, Houston Astros – 7 (18)	Minute Maid Park	5:50	43,413

== St. Louis vs. San Diego ==
=== Game 1 ===
October 4, 2005 12:10 pm (CDT) at Busch Stadium (II) in St. Louis, Missouri 84 °F (29 °C), sunny
Team	1	2	3	4	5	6	7	8	9	R	H	E
San Diego	0	0	0	0	0	0	1	1	3	5	13	1
St. Louis	1	0	3	0	4	0	0	0	X	8	10	1
WP: Chris Carpenter (1–0) LP: Jake Peavy (0–1); Home runs: SD: Eric Young (1); STL: Jim Edmonds (1), Reggie Sanders (1); Attendance: 52,349; Boxscore

It was a matchup between Jake Peavy and eventual 2005 Cy Young Award winner Chris Carpenter. In the bottom of the first, Jim Edmonds's one-out solo home run put the Cardinals up 1–0. Then in the bottom of the third, Peavy's control slipped away as a bases-loaded wild pitch and a two-run single by Reggie Sanders gave the Cards a 4–0 lead. However, Sanders would provide more offense with a grand slam in the fifth. That would make the score 8–0 and give Sanders six RBIs in the game. The Padres would not go quietly, though. They would scratch out a run in the seventh on a sacrifice fly by Khalil Greene off Brad Thompson after a leadoff double and single, then one more on a home run by Eric Young in the eighth off Randy Flores. After the Padres put runners on the corners in the ninth off Cal Eldred, Jason Isringhausen came on to close the deal. Yet, after Young's groundout scored a run, four consecutive hits with two outs, two of which by Mark Loretta and Brian Giles, made the score 8–5 and loaded the bases with the go-ahead run at the plate. Ramón Hernández did not deliver as he struck out to end the game. It was later known that Peavy was pitching with a broken rib, which may have affected his effectiveness.

=== Game 2 ===
October 6, 2005 3:10 pm (CDT) at Busch Stadium (II) in St. Louis, Missouri 61 °F (16 °C), sunny
Team	1	2	3	4	5	6	7	8	9	R	H	E
San Diego	0	0	0	0	0	0	1	1	0	2	10	1
St. Louis	0	0	2	2	0	0	2	0	X	6	6	0
WP: Mark Mulder (1–0) LP: Pedro Astacio (0–1); Attendance: 52,599; Boxscore

Pedro Astacio faced Mark Mulder in Game 2. The game remained scoreless until the bottom of the third when a walk to Abraham Nunez and an error by Khalil Greene on Yadier Molina's ground ball put two on with no out. After a sacrifice bunt, David Eckstein's fielder's choice scored a run, then a walk loaded the bases before Albert Pujols walked to score another. After a leadoff single and double, a fielder's choice by Molina and squeeze play by Eckstein made it 4–0 Cardinals in the fourth. In the top of the seventh, after being shutout for six innings, a double and two singles, the second of which by Xavier Nady scoring a run, made it 4–1 and put the tying run at the plate. However, a double play killed the rally and the Padres would only get one. Reggie Sanders got two more RBIs with a two-run double in the bottom half of the inning off Rudy Seanez. A bases-loaded hit-by-pitch to Nady by Julián Tavárez made it 6–2 in the eighth, but Randy Flores struck out Mark Sweeney to end the threat while Jason Isringhausen retired the Padres in order in the ninth to give the Cardinals a 2–0 series lead.

=== Game 3 ===
October 8, 2005 8:10 pm (PDT) at Petco Park in San Diego, California 65 °F (18 °C), clear
Team	1	2	3	4	5	6	7	8	9	R	H	E
St. Louis	1	4	0	0	2	0	0	0	0	7	13	1
San Diego	0	0	0	0	2	0	1	1	0	4	9	0
WP: Matt Morris (1–0) LP: Woody Williams (0–1) Sv: Jason Isringhausen (1); Home runs: STL: David Eckstein (1); SD: Dave Roberts (1), Ramón Hernández (1); Attendance: 45,093; Boxscore

This was the first postseason game in PETCO Park history, which had opened the previous year. Matt Morris faced former Cardinals pitcher Woody Williams. Albert Pujols drove in David Eckstein with an RBI double in the top of the first after Eckstein singled to lead off. Then Eckstein hit a two-run home run in the second to make it 3–0. The Cards did stop there, loaded the bases double, walk and hit-by-pitch before Reggie Sanders collected two more RBIs on a two-run double to make it 5–0 later. That would bring Sanders' RBI total to ten for the series. Then Yadier Molina's two-run single off Clay Hensley in the top of the fifth made it 7–0 Cardinals. In the bottom of the inning, Joe Randa doubled before RBI singles by Eric Young and Mark Loretta made it 7–2 Cardinals. Then home runs by Dave Roberts's in the seventh off Brad Thompson and Ramón Hernández in the eighth off Julián Tavárez made it 7–4 Cardinals, but Jason Isringhausen came on to slam the door on the Padres in the ninth despite allowing a single and walk with Ryan Klesko's groundout ending the series.

The 2005 Padres became the first team to qualify for the postseason in a non-shortened season and end up losing more games (83) than it won (82) in the regular season and playoffs (the 1981 Royals were 50–53 in the strike-shortened regular season, then were swept in three games in the American League West Division Series by the Athletics).

=== Composite box ===
2005 NLDS (3–0): St. Louis Cardinals over San Diego Padres

Team	1	2	3	4	5	6	7	8	9	R	H	E
St. Louis Cardinals	2	4	5	2	6	0	2	0	0	21	29	2
San Diego Padres	0	0	0	0	2	0	3	3	3	11	32	2
Total attendance: 150,041 Average attendance: 50,014

== Atlanta vs. Houston ==
=== Game 1 ===
October 5, 2005 4:10 pm (EDT) at Turner Field in Atlanta, Georgia 80 °F (27 °C), overcast & windy
Team	1	2	3	4	5	6	7	8	9	R	H	E
Houston	1	0	2	1	0	0	1	5	0	10	11	1
Atlanta	1	0	0	2	0	0	0	1	1	5	9	0
WP: Andy Pettitte (1–0) LP: Tim Hudson (0–1); Home runs: HOU: None; ATL: Chipper Jones (1), Andruw Jones (1); Attendance: 40,590; Boxscore

Andy Pettitte faced Tim Hudson in Game 1. Hudson struggled in his half of the first, giving up one run (on Morgan Ensberg's RBI single) on a walk and two hits, but got out of the inning with a crucial double play. Pettitte allowed a home run to Chipper Jones to tie the game, but otherwise cruised. The game remained 1–1 until the third when a bases-loaded (on a double and two walks) two-run single by Ensberg made it 3–1 Astros. A hit-by-pitch loaded the bases again, but Hudson got Adam Everett to ground out to end the inning. Next inning, Brad Ausmus hit a leadoff double, moved to third on a sacrifice bunt, and scored on Craig Biggio's sacrifice fly to make it 4–1 Astros. In the Braves' fourth, Andruw Jones hit a two-run home run to make it a one-run game. A walk and a bunt single put the tying run in scoring position later in the inning, but Brian Jordan grounded into a double play to end the rally. Pettitte would help his own cause in the seventh with the game still at 4–3, doubling and scoring on an RBI hit by Ensberg. It was now 5–3 and Hudson was finished. In the eighth, with Chris Reitsma pitching, the Astros opened the floodgates with a five-run rally, loading the bases on two singles and a walk before Jeff Bagwell's RBI single made it 6–3 Astros. John Foster in relief struck out Lance Berkman, but walked Ensberg to force in a run before a wild pitch scored another. After Jason Lane was intentionally walked to reload the bases, Orlando Palmeiro capped the inning's scoring with a two-run single that made it 10–3 Astros. The Braves scored two runs on Jones's RBI double in the eighth with two on off Dan Wheeler and the ninth on Johnny Estrada's RBI single after a leadoff triple off Russ Springer, but Mike Gallo got Rafael Furcal to hit into the game-ending double play as the Astros won Game 1 10–5.

=== Game 2 ===
October 6, 2005 8:20 pm (EDT) at Turner Field in Atlanta, Georgia 71 °F (22 °C), overcast & windy
Team	1	2	3	4	5	6	7	8	9	R	H	E
Houston	1	0	0	0	0	0	0	0	0	1	8	1
Atlanta	0	3	2	0	0	0	2	0	X	7	11	0
WP: John Smoltz (1–0) LP: Roger Clemens (0–1); Home runs: HOU: None; ATL: Brian McCann (1); Attendance: 46,181; Boxscore

Roger Clemens faced John Smoltz in Game 2. Smoltz ran into trouble when he allowed two consecutive singles with one out. After a forceout, Jason Lane singled in Lance Berkman to make it 1–0 Astros. He intentionally loaded the bases, but got out of the inning with no more damage done. Then the Braves struck back against Clemens. With two outs and two men on, Brian McCann came up in his first ever postseason at-bat. He then slammed a three-run home run to right field, becoming the first Brave ever to homer in his first postseason at-bat. That sparked the Braves as they would go on to score two more in the third on a two-run double by Adam LaRoche. Smoltz pitched masterfully and the Braves added to their lead in the seventh on RBI singles by Andruw Jones and Jeff Francoeur off Chad Qualls. The Braves' victory in Game 2 was their last postseason win until 2010.

=== Game 3 ===
October 8, 2005 7:09 pm (CDT) at Minute Maid Park in Houston, Texas 72 °F (22 °C), roof closed
Team	1	2	3	4	5	6	7	8	9	R	H	E
Atlanta	0	2	0	0	0	0	0	1	0	3	8	0
Houston	2	0	1	0	0	0	4	0	X	7	12	1
WP: Roy Oswalt (1–0) LP: Jorge Sosa (0–1); Home runs: ATL: None; HOU: Mike Lamb (1); Attendance: 43,759; Boxscore

Jorge Sosa faced Roy Oswalt in Game 3. Sosa fell behind early, allowing a double and hit-by-pitch before Morgan Ensberg's double and Jason Lane's sacrifice fly gave the Astros two runs in the first. The Braves tied the game in the next inning with back-to-back two out RBI singles by Brian McCann and Sosa. However, Mike Lamb hit the go-ahead home run in the bottom of the third. The two pitchers dueled until the bottom of the seventh when Chris Reitsma once again came into a close game. Reitsma allowed a double and single and the Braves' bullpen could do little to stop the Astros' rally. Lance Berkman hit an RBI single off John Foster, then Joey Devine allowed an RBI double to Ensberg and RBI single to Lane. Adam Everett's sacrifice fly off Jim Brower capped the inning's scoring. The Braves got a run in the eighth thanks to an RBI double by Andruw Jones off Dan Wheeler after Marcus Giles singled to lead off against Roy Oswalt, but no more. Brad Lidge pitched a scoreless ninth as the Astros won Game 3, 7–3.

=== Game 4 ===
October 9, 2005 12:10 pm (CDT) Minute Maid Park in Houston, Texas 72 °F (22 °C), roof closed
Team	1	2	3	4	5	6	7	8	9	10	11	12	13	14	15	16	17	18	R	H	E
Atlanta	0	0	4	0	1	0	0	1	0	0	0	0	0	0	0	0	0	0	6	13	0
Houston	0	0	0	0	1	0	0	4	1	0	0	0	0	0	0	0	0	1	7	10	1
WP: Roger Clemens (1–1) LP: Joey Devine (0–1); Home runs: ATL: Adam LaRoche (1), Brian McCann (2); HOU: Lance Berkman (1), Brad Ausmus (1), Chris Burke (1); Attendance: 43,413; Boxscore

The final game of the series lasted 18 innings and set records as the longest game in the history of Major League Baseball's postseason, both in terms of time and number of innings. This was two innings longer than another Astros playoff game that had the previous record for innings, Game 6 of the 1986 NLCS, which went 16 innings, with the New York Mets prevailing 7–6. It also broke the record for the longest playoff game duration with 5 hours and 50 minutes, beating Game 3 of the 2000 National League Division Series between the San Francisco Giants and the Mets, which lasted 5 hours and 22 minutes. This record was broken (by 2/3 of an inning) by Game 2 of the 2014 NLDS, when the San Francisco Giants defeated the Washington Nationals, 2–1. Coincidentally enough, Tim Hudson started both the 2005 and 2014 games, in the former as a Brave and the latter as a Giant. Additionally, Adam LaRoche was on the losing team in both games, playing for the Nationals in 2014. Coincidentally also, the score of this game matched the score of Game 6 of the 1986 Series, except that in 1986, the Astros were on the losing end.

In the third, the Braves struck first when Rafael Furcal walked, Marcus Giles hit a force play before Chipper Jones walked and a hit-by-pitch to Andruw Jones loaded the bases off Astros starter Brandon Backe. Adam LaRoche's grand slam put them up 4–0. In the fifth, Giles singled and Jones doubled before Andruw Jones's sacrifice fly scored Giles to make it 5–0 and knocked Backe out of the game. The Braves then loaded the bases, but Mike Gallo in relief got a ground out to escape further damage. In the bottom of the inning, the Astros loaded the bases on three singles but only scored once on pinch-hitter Orlando Palmeiro's sacrifice fly. In the top of the seventh, LaRoche attempted to score from first on Jeff Francoeur's double, but was thrown out at the plate in what proved to be a crucial play. Francoeur moved to third on the throw home but was stranded. Brian McCann's home run in the eighth off Wandy Rodriguez made it 6–1 Braves, but in the bottom of the inning, Hudson walked Brad Ausmus and allowed an infield single to pinch-hitter Eric Bruntlett to end his night. Kyle Farnsworth relived Hudson and got one out, but threw a wild pitch that advanced Ausmus and Bruntlett to second and third and walked pinch-hitter Luke Scott on a full count to load the bases. Lance Berkman then hit a grand slam to cut the lead to 6-5. In the ninth and down to their final out, Brad Ausmus hit a solo home run that barely cleared the left-center wall and Andruw Jones's glove off Farnsworth to tie the game and force extra innings.

Each team had opportunities to score in extra innings. In the top of the tenth, Atlanta's Ryan Langerhans doubled with one out off Astros reliever Chad Qualls, but he was stranded. In the bottom of the tenth, Scott hit what appeared to be a walk-off home run down the left-field line, but the ball hooked at the last second and barely missed the foul pole. Scott grounded out. Houston nearly scored when Berkman doubled with two outs, but Braves reliever Chris Reitsma intentionally walked Morgan Ensberg retired pinch-hitter Jeff Bagwell to end the inning. In the eleventh, the Braves put runners on second and third with one out, but Astros closer Brad Lidge escaped the jam. In the top of the 14th, the Braves loaded the bases with one out off Dan Wheeler, but Wheeler struck out McCann and got a force play to keep the game tied. In the bottom of the 15th, the Astros put runners on first and second with one out, but Braves reliever Jim Brower got Ensberg to ground into an inning-ending double play. The Astros got three innings of relief by Roger Clemens, appearing as a pinch-hitter in the 15th inning (hitting a sacrifice bunt) and pitching in relief for only the second time in his career and his first time since 1984 (and appearing this time only because the Astros were out of pitchers). Clemens atoned for his Game 2 loss with three scoreless innings, striking out four, and allowing only one hit. Chris Burke hit the game-ending home run with one out in the bottom of the 18th off Atlanta rookie Joey Devine, giving Houston the series victory and sending them to the NLCS to face the St. Louis Cardinals.

In addition to being at the time the longest postseason game in MLB history, it was also the only postseason game to include two grand slams, Lance Berkman's and Adam LaRoche's. At the time, some commentators pointed to this game as the greatest game in Houston Astros history, and one of the best games in the history of MLB playoffs.

Even more remarkable than the game's length, perhaps, is the fact that the fan who caught Chris Burke's walk-off homer in the 18th was the same fan who had caught Lance Berkman's grand slam in the eighth (Section 102, Row 2, Seat 15); the fan later donated both balls to the Baseball Hall of Fame.

=== Composite box ===
2005 NLDS (3–1): Houston Astros over Atlanta Braves

Team	1	2	3	4	5	6	7	8	9	10	11	12	13	14	15	16	17	18	R	H	E
Houston Astros	4	0	3	1	1	0	5	9	1	0	0	0	0	0	0	0	0	1	25	41	4
Atlanta Braves	1	5	6	2	1	0	2	3	1	0	0	0	0	0	0	0	0	0	21	41	0
Total attendance: 173,943 Average attendance: 43,486
