= 2005 Major League Baseball postseason =

2005 Major League Baseball playoffs

Tournament details
- Dates: October 4–26, 2005
- Teams: 8

Final positions
- Champions: Chicago White Sox (3rd title)
- Runners-up: Houston Astros

Tournament statistics
- Most HRs: Paul Konerko (CHW) (5)
- Most SBs: Scott Podsednik (CHW) (6)
- Most Ks (as pitcher): Roy Oswalt (HOU) (22)

Awards
- MVP: Jermaine Dye (CHW)

The 2005 Major League Baseball postseason was the playoff tournament of Major League Baseball for the 2005 season. The winners of the League Division Series would move on to the League Championship Series to determine the pennant winners that face each other in the World Series.

In the American League, the New York Yankees returned for the eleventh straight year, the Boston Red Sox returned for the third year in a row and sixth in the last nine years, the now-Los Angeles Angels of Anaheim made their third appearance in the past four years, and the Chicago White Sox returned for the second time in six years.

In the National League, the Atlanta Braves made their fourteenth straight postseason appearance, the San Diego Padres returned for the first time since 1998, the St. Louis Cardinals returned for the fifth time in six years, and the Houston Astros returned for the sixth time in eight years. This was Houston's last postseason appearance as a member of the National League, and their last postseason appearance overall until 2015.

The postseason began on October 4, 2005, and ended on October 26, 2005, with the White Sox sweeping the Astros in the 2005 World Series. It was the Chicago's first World Series title since 1917 and the third overall for the White Sox, which marked the end of the Curse of the Black Sox.

== Playoff seeds ==
The following teams qualified for the postseason:

American League Teams National League Teams

=== American League ===
1. Chicago White Sox – 99–63, AL Central champions
2. Los Angeles Angels of Anaheim – 95–67, AL West champions (6–4 head-to-head record vs. NYY)
3. New York Yankees – 95–67, AL East champions (4–6 head-to-head record vs. LAA; 10–9 head-to-head record vs. BOS)
4. Boston Red Sox – 95–67 (9–10 head-to-head record vs. NYY)

=== National League ===
1. St. Louis Cardinals – 100–62, NL Central champions
2. Atlanta Braves – 90–72, NL East champions
3. San Diego Padres – 82–80, NL West champions
4. Houston Astros – 89–73

== Playoff bracket ==
Division Series (ALDS, NLDS)
1	Chicago White Sox	3
4	Boston	0
American League
2	LA Angels	3
3	NY Yankees	2
1	St. Louis	3
3	San Diego	0
National League
2	Atlanta	1
4	Houston	3

League Championship Series (NLCS, ALCS)
1	Chicago White Sox	4
2	LA Angels	1
1	St. Louis	2
4	Houston	4

World Series
AL1	Chicago White Sox	4
NL4	Houston	0

Note: Two teams in the same division could not meet in the division series.

== American League Division Series ==
=== (1) Chicago White Sox vs. (4) Boston Red Sox ===
Chicago won the series, 3–0.

Game	Date	Score	Location	Time	Attendance
1	October 4	Boston Red Sox – 2, Chicago White Sox – 14	U.S. Cellular Field	2:56	40,717
2	October 5	Boston Red Sox – 4, Chicago White Sox – 5	U.S. Cellular Field	2:29	40,799
3	October 7	Chicago White Sox – 5, Boston Red Sox – 3	Fenway Park	3:28	35,496

The White Sox swept the defending World Series champion Red Sox to return to the ALCS for the first time since 1993. It was the first playoff series win for the White Sox since the 1917 World Series.

In Game 1, four different players - A. J. Pierzynski, Paul Konerko, Juan Uribe, and Scott Podsednik - all homered for the White Sox as they blew out the Red Sox. In Game 2, ignited by a two-run RBI single from Manny Ramirez, the Red Sox jumped out to an early 4–0 lead, but the White Sox put up five unanswered runs in the bottom of the fifth, capped off by a three-run home run from Tadahito Iguchi, to take a 2–0 series lead headed to Boston. Game 3 remained tied until the top of the sixth when Konerko homered again to put the White Sox in the lead for good.

To date, this remains the White Sox's only victory in the ALDS.

=== (2) Los Angeles Angels of Anaheim vs. (3) New York Yankees ===
Los Angeles won the series, 3–2.

Game	Date	Score	Location	Time	Attendance
1	October 4	New York Yankees – 4, Los Angeles Angels of Anaheim – 2	Angel Stadium of Anaheim	2:59	45,142
2	October 5	New York Yankees – 3, Los Angeles Angels of Anaheim – 5	Angel Stadium of Anaheim	3:05	45,150
3	October 7	Los Angeles Angels of Anaheim – 11, New York Yankees – 7	Yankee Stadium (I)	4:00	56,277
4	October 9†	Los Angeles Angels of Anaheim – 2, New York Yankees – 3	Yankee Stadium (I)	3:13	56,226
5	October 10	New York Yankees – 3, Los Angeles Angels of Anaheim – 5	Angel Stadium of Anaheim	3:29	45,133

†: Game was postponed due to rain on October 8

This was the second postseason meeting between the Yankees and Angels. The Angels defeated the Yankees in five games to return to the ALCS for the second time in five years.

The Yankees’ offense got to AL Cy Young winner Bartolo Colón early as they stole Game 1 in Anaheim. In Game 2, the Yankees jumped out to yet another early lead, but the Angels rallied with a 5–1 run in between the fifth and eighth innings in part thanks to home runs from Juan Rivera and Bengie Molina to even the series headed to the Bronx. Game 3 was an offensive shootout that was won by the Angels to take the series lead. In Game 4, the Angels jumped out to a 2–0 lead in the top of the sixth, but the Yankees rallied with three unanswered runs thanks to RBI singles from Derek Jeter and Rubén Sierra to force a decisive fifth game back in Anaheim. However, the Angels held on as they came from behind once again to win and advance.

The Angels and Yankees would meet again in the ALCS in 2009, which was won by the Yankees en route to a World Series title.

== National League Division Series ==
=== (1) St. Louis Cardinals vs. (3) San Diego Padres ===
St. Louis won the series, 3–0.

Game	Date	Score	Location	Time	Attendance
1	October 4	San Diego Padres – 5, St. Louis Cardinals – 8	Busch Stadium (II)	2:57	52,349
2	October 6	San Diego Padres – 2, St. Louis Cardinals – 6	Busch Stadium (II)	2:54	52,599
3	October 8	St. Louis Cardinals – 7, San Diego Padres – 4	PETCO Park	3:07	45,093

This was the second postseason meeting between Cardinals and Padres. They last met in the NLDS in 1996, which was won by the Cardinals. The Cardinals swept the Padres once again to return to the NLCS for the second year in a row.

Game 1 was taken by the Cardinals, in part thanks to a home run from Jim Edmonds and a grand slam from Reggie Sanders. Mark Mulder pitched six solid innings as the Cardinals won 6–2 to take a 2–0 series lead headed to San Diego. In Game 3, the Cardinals jumped out to a big lead early and held it to win 7-4 and complete the sweep.

Both teams would meet again in the NLDS the next year and in the Wild Card round in 2020, with the Cardinals winning the former and the Padres winning the latter.

=== (2) Atlanta Braves vs. (4) Houston Astros ===
Houston won the series, 3–1.

Game	Date	Score	Location	Time	Attendance
1	October 5	Houston Astros – 10, Atlanta Braves – 5	Turner Field	3:11	40,590
2	October 6	Houston Astros – 1, Atlanta Braves – 7	Turner Field	2:52	46,181
3	October 8	Atlanta Braves – 3, Houston Astros – 7	Minute Maid Park	2:50	43,759
4	October 9	Atlanta Braves – 6, Houston Astros – 7 (18)	Minute Maid Park	5:50	43,413

In the fifth postseason meeting between these two teams, the Astros once again defeated the Braves to advance to the NLCS for the second year in a row.

Andy Pettitte pitched seven solid innings despite surrendering five runs as the Astros prevailed in a blowout in Game 1. In Game 2, John Smoltz would pitch seven solid innings as the Braves blew out the Astros to even the series headed to Houston. Roy Oswalt went seven innings for the Astros as they won 7–3 to regain the series lead.

Game 4 was the most memorable contest of the series - it was an offensive shootout between both teams. Adam LaRoche and Lance Berkman traded grand slams, and Brad Ausmus hit a solo home run in the bottom of the ninth to force what would be nine extra innings. The Astros prevailed in the bottom of the eighteenth thanks to a walk-off solo home run from Chris Burke. Game 4 was at the time the longest game in postseason history, both in terms of time and number of innings played. The eighteen inning record of Game 4 was broken (by 2/3 of an inning) by Game 2 of the 2014 NLDS, and the time record of five hours and fifty minutes was broken by Game 3 of the 2018 World Series, which lasted seven hours and twenty minutes.

The loss to the Astros in the NLDS marked the end of the Braves’ postseason appearance streak, which started in 1991. The Braves’ 14-year streak of consecutive postseason appearances stood alone as an MLB record until it was tied by the Los Angeles Dodgers in 2026.

The Braves and Astros would meet again in the 2021 World Series, which the Braves won in six games.

== American League Championship Series ==
=== (1) Chicago White Sox vs. (2) Los Angeles Angels of Anaheim ===
Chicago won the series, 4–1.

Game	Date	Score	Location	Time	Attendance
1	October 11	Los Angeles Angels of Anaheim – 3, Chicago White Sox – 2	U.S. Cellular Field	2:47	40,659
2	October 12	Los Angeles Angels of Anaheim – 1, Chicago White Sox – 2	U.S. Cellular Field	2:34	41,013
3	October 14	Chicago White Sox – 5, Los Angeles Angels of Anaheim – 2	Angel Stadium of Anaheim	2:42	44,725
4	October 15	Chicago White Sox – 8, Los Angeles Angels of Anaheim – 2	Angel Stadium of Anaheim	2:46	44,857
5	October 16	Chicago White Sox – 6, Los Angeles Angels of Anaheim – 3	Angel Stadium of Anaheim	3:11	44,712

The White Sox defeated the Angels in five games to return to the World Series for the first time since 1959, ending what was the longest pennant drought in the American League at that time.

Paul Byrd pitched six solid innings as the Angels stole Game 1 on the road, which would be the only loss the White Sox suffered in the entire 2005 postseason. In Game 2, Mark Buehrle pitched a five-hit complete game as the White Sox evened the series headed to Anaheim. In Game 3, Jon Garland pitched another complete game for the White Sox, giving up only four hits in a 5–2 win. Freddy Garcia pitched Chicago's third straight complete game in Game 4 as the White Sox blew out the Angels to go up 3–1 in the series. Then, in Game 5, José Contreras pitched a fourth straight complete game in a 6–3 victory to secure the pennant. The White Sox became the second team in MLB history to pitch four straight complete games in the postseason; the only other team to do so being their cross-town rivals in the Chicago Cubs, who first accomplished that feat in the 1907 World Series.

The Angels returned to the ALCS in 2009, but they fell to the eventual World Series champion New York Yankees in six games.

As of 2026, this is the last time the White Sox won the AL pennant.

== National League Championship Series ==
=== (1) St. Louis Cardinals vs. (4) Houston Astros ===
Houston won the series, 4–2.

Game	Date	Score	Location	Time	Attendance
1	October 12	Houston Astros – 3, St. Louis Cardinals – 5	Busch Stadium (II)	2:29	52,332
2	October 13	Houston Astros – 4, St. Louis Cardinals – 1	Busch Stadium (II)	3:03	52,358
3	October 15	St. Louis Cardinals – 3, Houston Astros – 4	Minute Maid Park	3:00	42,823
4	October 16	St. Louis Cardinals – 1, Houston Astros – 2	Minute Maid Park	3:11	43,010
5	October 17	St. Louis Cardinals – 5, Houston Astros – 4	Minute Maid Park	3:19	43,470
6	October 19	Houston Astros – 5, St. Louis Cardinals – 1	Busch Stadium (II)	2:53	52,438

This was a rematch of the previous year's NLCS, which the Cardinals won in seven games before falling in the World Series. This time, the Astros returned the favor, knocking off the defending National League champion Cardinals in six games to advance to the World Series for the first time in franchise history.

Chris Carpenter pitched eight solid innings as the Cardinals took Game 1. Roy Oswalt and the Astros’ bullpen kept the Cardinals’ offense stagnant in Game 2 as the Astros evened the series headed to Houston. Roger Clemens won his twelfth postseason game as the Astros took Game 3 and the series lead. Game 4 saw both teams go through their bullpens throughout the course of the game, however the Astros would win by one run to take a 3-1 series lead. Game 4 was notable for Cardinals’ manager Tony La Russa’s ejection after a heated argument with umpires over balls and strikes, as he was the first manager to be ejected from a postseason game since the Cleveland Indians’ Mike Hargrove in the 1998 ALCS. The Astros looked poised to clinch their first pennant in front of their home fans, but things didn’t go their way just yet. In Game 5, the Astros lead 4-2 in the top of the ninth and were a strike away from clinching the pennant despite putting two on base. However, Albert Pujols hit a three-run home run to put the Cardinals ahead for good, sending the series back to St. Louis. However, the Astros would clinch the pennant in Game 6, as Oswalt pitched seven solid innings and the Astros’ bullpen kept the Cardinals bats silent. Oswalt was named NLCS MVP. Game 6 was the last game ever played at Busch Memorial Stadium.

This would be the last playoff series win by the Astros as a member of the National League, as in 2013 they would join the American League. The Astros would win their next pennant in 2017 over the New York Yankees in seven games en route to a World Series title.

The Cardinals returned to the NLCS the next year, and upset the New York Mets in seven games en route to a World Series title.

== 2005 World Series ==
=== (AL1) Chicago White Sox vs. (NL4) Houston Astros ===
Chicago (AL) won the series, 4–0.

Game	Date	Score	Location	Time	Attendance
1	October 22	Houston Astros – 3, Chicago White Sox – 5	U.S. Cellular Field	3:13	41,206
2	October 23	Houston Astros – 6, Chicago White Sox – 7	U.S. Cellular Field	3:11	41,432
3	October 25	Chicago White Sox – 7, Houston Astros – 5 (14)	Minute Maid Park	5:41	42,848
4	October 26	Chicago White Sox – 1, Houston Astros – 0	Minute Maid Park	3:20	42,936

This was the first postseason meeting between the White Sox and Astros, and the first World Series ever played in Texas. The White Sox swept the Astros to win their first World Series title since 1917, ending the Curse of the Black Sox and what was the second longest championship drought in North American sports at that time.

Even though this World Series ended in a sweep, all four games were decided by two runs or less. In the first World Series game played in Chicago in 46 years, the White Sox took Game 1 by a narrow 5–3 score, a game which was notable for Roger Clemens' shortest World Series start, which lasted two innings and 53 pitches due to a sore hamstring. In Game 2, the Astros possessed a 4–2 lead going into the bottom of the seventh inning, until Chicago's Paul Konerko hit a grand slam to put the White Sox in the lead. The Astros tied the game in the top of the ninth thanks to a base hit from José Vizcaíno which scored two runs. However, the White Sox prevailed in the bottom of the ninth, as Astros' closer Brad Lidge gave up a walk-off home run to Scott Podsednik, giving them a 2–0 series lead headed to Houston. In the first World Series game ever played in Texas, the Astros held a 4–0 lead after four innings of play, however the White Sox rallied with a 5-run fifth inning to take the lead. The Astros tied the game in the bottom of the eighth which eventually sent the game into extra innings, and remained scoreless until the top of the fourteenth, where the White Sox scored two runs to take the lead for good, and closed out the Astros in the bottom of the inning to take a commanding three games to none series lead. Then, after seven scoreless innings in Game 4, Chicago's Jermaine Dye drove in Willie Harris to take a 1–0 lead, which the White Sox would not relinquish as they closed out the Astros in the ninth to secure their first title in 88 years.

As of 2026, this is the last postseason appearance outside of the Divisional round for the White Sox. After their World Series victory, the White Sox entered a slump as they only made the postseason three more times, and in 2024, the team set a mark of baseball futility by losing an MLB-record 121 games.

This would be the last postseason appearance by the Astros as a member of the National League. In 2013, they joined the American League. They would return to the World Series in 2017, defeating the Los Angeles Dodgers in seven games.

The White Sox and Astros would meet again in the ALDS in 2021 and the Wild Card round in 2026, with the Astros winning the former and the White Sox winning the latter.

== Broadcasting ==
This was the third of four years that Division Series games aired across ESPN, ESPN2, and Fox. Fox then aired both League Championship Series and the World Series.
