= Wes Helms =

American baseball player

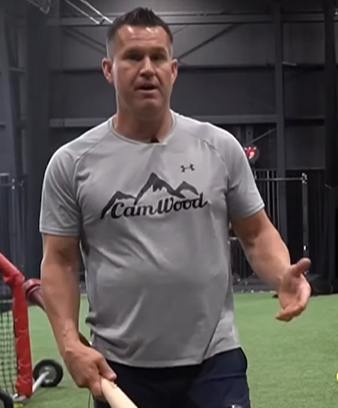
- Helms in 2023
- Third baseman / First baseman
- Born: May 12, 1976 (age 49); Gastonia, North Carolina, U.S.
- Batted: Right Threw: Right

MLB debut
- September 5, 1998, for the Atlanta Braves

Last MLB appearance
- August 13, 2011, for the Florida Marlins

MLB statistics
- Batting average: .256
- Home runs: 75
- Runs batted in: 374
- Stats at Baseball Reference

Teams
- Atlanta Braves (1998, 2000–2002); Milwaukee Brewers (2003–2005); Florida Marlins (2006); Philadelphia Phillies (2007); Florida Marlins (2008–2011)

Wesley Ray Helms (born May 12, 1976) is an American former professional baseball player. During his 13-year playing career, Helms played for the Atlanta Braves, Milwaukee Brewers, Florida Marlins, and Philadelphia Phillies. He played primarily as a third baseman and first baseman. Helms also served as the manager of the Charlotte Knights, the Triple-A affiliate of the Chicago White Sox.

== Professional career ==
Helms attended and played baseball at Ashbrook High School in Gastonia, North Carolina. The Atlanta Braves selected Helms in the 10th round of the 1994 Major League Baseball draft. He made his major league debut with the Braves on September 5, 1998.

On December 16, 2002, the Braves traded Helms and John Foster to the Milwaukee Brewers in exchange for Ray King. Following a successful first season with the Brewers, in which he hit 23 home runs and collected 67 RBI, he suffered a knee injury in a game against the Montreal Expos. After returning from the disabled list, he struggled to regain his previous form as well as playing time, being demoted to backup duties behind Russell Branyan.

On November 15, 2006, Helms agreed to a two-year, $5.5 million contract-in-principle with the Philadelphia Phillies, which included a club option for the third year. On April 2, 2008, he was designated for assignment by the Phillies, and three days later was traded to the Florida Marlins, in exchange for cash considerations. He was released by the Marlins on August 13, 2011.

On August 17, 2011, he signed a minor league contract with the Atlanta Braves and was assigned to the Triple-A Gwinnett Braves. He was released by the Braves on September 1, 2011.

== Coaching career ==
Helms was the bench coach of the Triple-A Lehigh Valley IronPigs for the 2018 season, followed by the Double-A Birmingham Barons for the 2019 season. In 2020, he was named manager of the Triple-A Charlotte Knights.

On May 20, 2022, the White Sox put Helms on an indefinite leave of absence from the Knights.

== Personal life ==
Helms is the nephew of former big-leaguer Tommy Helms.
