= Joey Devine =

American baseball player (born 1983)

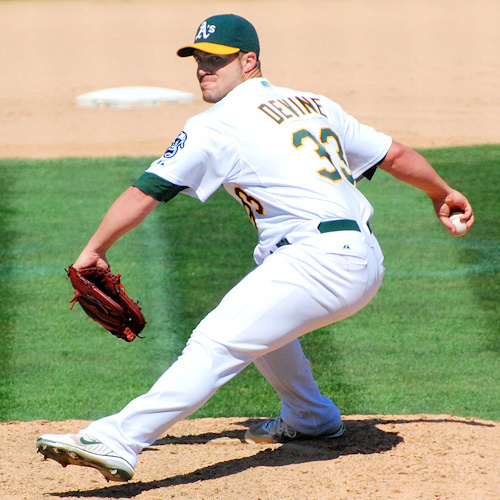
- Joey Devine pitches for the Oakland Athletics
- Relief pitcher
- Born: September 19, 1983 (age 42); Junction City, Kansas, U.S.
- Batted: Right Threw: Right

MLB debut
- August 20, 2005, for the Atlanta Braves

Last MLB appearance
- July 24, 2011, for the Oakland Athletics

MLB statistics
- Win–loss record: 8–3
- Earned run average: 2.75
- Strikeouts: 89
- Stats at Baseball Reference

Teams
- Atlanta Braves (2005–2007); Oakland Athletics (2008, 2011)
Medals
Men's baseball
Representing United States
World University Championship
Gold medal – first place	2004 Tainan	Team

Joseph Neal Devine (born September 19, 1983) is an American former professional baseball pitcher. He played in Major League Baseball (MLB) for the Atlanta Braves and Oakland Athletics.

== Baseball career ==
=== Atlanta Braves ===
Devine was the Braves' first selection (27th overall) in the first round of the 2005 Major League Baseball draft out of North Carolina State University, where he had set the Wolfpack record for saves with 24 and made the All-Atlantic Coast Conference team three times. After being drafted, Devine spent only two months in the minor leagues, pitching with the High-A Myrtle Beach Pelicans and the Double-A Mississippi Braves, before being called up to the major leagues on August 20. He was the first player in his draft class to make his MLB debut.

Devine encountered early struggles once being called up to the major leagues, becoming the first pitcher in major league history to allow a grand slam in each of his first two games. Braves manager Bobby Cox showed faith in Devine, however, by including him on the postseason roster despite his pitching only five innings with the big-league club during the regular season. In the 18th inning of Game 4 of the 2005 National League Division Series, Devine gave up a walk-off home run to Houston Astros rookie Chris Burke to end the Braves' season.

In 2006, Atlanta planned to have Devine start the season at Triple-A Richmond as the closer, but injuries to Horacio Ramírez and Blaine Boyer forced the Braves to call him up along with fellow reliever Ken Ray. Devine struggled once again, however, pitching a total of one inning in two games against the San Francisco Giants and giving up seven runs on five hits, five walks, and two wild pitches. Devine was optioned back to Richmond afterwards, with Peter Moylan serving as his replacement in Atlanta's bullpen. Devine was called up again in September and continued to pitch in Atlanta until the end of the regular season. Baseball America rated Devine as the Braves' ninth-best prospect entering 2007. Devine spent the majority of the 2007 season at Mississippi, though he was called up by Atlanta several times. On September 22, Devine earned his first major league victory against the Milwaukee Brewers. He finished the 2007 season 1–0 with a 1.08 ERA.

=== Oakland Athletics ===
On January 14, 2008, Devine was traded to the Oakland Athletics along with minor league pitcher Jamie Richmond in exchange for center fielder Mark Kotsay. Devine had a breakout season with the Athletics in 2008; in 45 2/3 innings, Devine gave up just 23 hits, walked only 15, struck out 49, held major-league batters to a .148 BA, and finished with a remarkable 0.59 ERA; the second lowest ever in MLB history among pitchers with a minimum of 45 innings since ERA became an official statistic in 1912. This record is not officially recognized because the MLB minimum is 50 innings.

Devine missed the 2009 season following Tommy John surgery on his right elbow. The operation was performed Tuesday, April 21, 2009, by Dr. James Andrews on Devine's ulnar collateral ligament. On December 2, Devine avoided arbitration and agreed to a one-year contract with the Oakland Athletics.

Devine remained inactive through the 2010 season while still recovering from the surgery. He finally returned to action in 2011. However, after struggling to find control in a flukish spring training game, Devine was sent down to the A's Triple-A affiliate, the Sacramento River Cats, to work out the kinks. He instantly regained his 2008 form and commenced to not allow a single earned run over his first 12 1/3 innings, striking out a solid 17, giving up only 4 hits, and walking a mere one batter. Devine was recalled to Oakland's Major League Roster on May 20, 2011. Devine's longest streak of innings without yielding an earned run (33 2/3 innings) was broken on June 3, due to inherited runs acquired through reliever Brian Fuentes.

After pitching relatively well after his return to the MLB roster in 2011, Devine struggled in late July during his last three outings of that month (Devine attributed control issues to heat and lack of grip during a heat wave in which temps. were over 100 °F (56 °C)). On July 22, 2011, he walked three consecutive Yankees, throwing a wild pitch behind Brandon Laird to initiate the latter's debut major-league at-bat. His control issues lead to his being demoted back to Sacramento on July 28, despite the fact that many of the earned runs he had acquired to that point were inherited after he stepped off the mound. Prior to his last three outings, Devine was one of the leading pitchers on Oakland's MLB pitching staff statistically: 2.14 ERA and declining, over 9K/9 innings, and high octane pitch speeds of up to 97 MPH, with additional nasty off speed pitch movement in his slider, low hits/outs ratio, hitters average under .200, no homers allowed, and an average walk rate.

It was announced on April 10, 2012, that Devine had undergone his second career Tommy John surgery. Devine was placed on the disabled list for the entirety of the 2012 season. On October 30, Devine was removed from the 40-man roster and sent outright to Triple-A; however, he rejected the assignment and elected free agency.

== Personal life ==
After leaving baseball, Devine worked for a sports agency, earned a degree from NC State while living in Raleigh, North Carolina and worked as a graduate assistant for his former college team.

In 2017, Devine told The Atlanta Journal-Constitution that Brian McCann was still one of his closest friends.

As of July 2018, he was married and had three young children.
