= Ray King (baseball) =

American baseball player (born 1974)

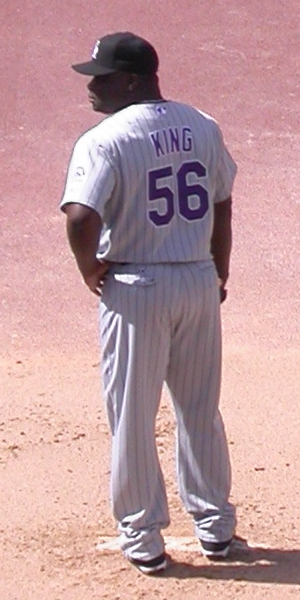
- King with the Colorado Rockies in 2006
- Pitcher
- Born: January 15, 1974 (age 52); Chicago, Illinois, U.S.
- Batted: Left Threw: Left

MLB debut
- May 21, 1999, for the Chicago Cubs

Last MLB appearance
- April 23, 2008, for the Washington Nationals

MLB statistics
- Win–loss record: 20–23
- Earned run average: 3.46
- Strikeouts: 278
- Stats at Baseball Reference

Teams
- Chicago Cubs (1999); Milwaukee Brewers (2000–2002); Atlanta Braves (2003); St. Louis Cardinals (2004–2005); Colorado Rockies (2006); Washington Nationals (2007); Milwaukee Brewers (2007); Washington Nationals (2008)

Raymond Keith King (born January 15, 1974) is an American former professional baseball relief pitcher. He played in Major League Baseball for the Chicago Cubs, Milwaukee Brewers, Atlanta Braves, St. Louis Cardinals, Colorado Rockies, and Washington Nationals from 1999 to 2008.

== Amateur career ==
King attended Ripley High School in Ripley, Tennessee. He lettered in football, basketball, and baseball. In baseball, he won All-America honors as a senior. He attended Lambuth University and played college baseball for the Lambuth Eagles.

== Professional career ==
In ten seasons in the major leagues, King appeared in 593 games and pitched 411 innings. He was 20–23 lifetime with a 3.46 ERA, 181 walks, 278 strikeouts and 2 saves. As a batter he was 0–6 at the plate with three strikeouts.

=== Early career ===
The Cincinnati Reds selected King in the eighth round of the 1995 MLB draft. He spent the next four seasons playing for minor league affiliates in the Reds, Atlanta Braves and Chicago Cubs organizations before finally making his major league debut on May 21, 1999 as a member of the Cubs.

=== Milwaukee Brewers ===
After two different stints with Chicago in 1999, King was dealt to the Milwaukee Brewers the following spring. During the 2001 and 2002 seasons the relief pitcher was a staple in the Brewers' bullpen, appearing in over 75 games each of those seasons.

=== Atlanta Braves ===
That off-season, King was dealt back to Atlanta for infielder Wes Helms and pitcher John Foster. King showed his durability once again, appearing in 80 games as the Braves' primary left-handed reliever. He also made his first career postseason appearance that season, pitching a scoreless inning of relief. He was on the move again, however, during the winter of 2003, joining the St. Louis Cardinals along with fellow pitchers Jason Marquis and Adam Wainwright.

=== St. Louis Cardinals ===
The 2004 season was King's finest in the majors to date. The rubber-armed lefty appeared in a career and team high 86 games for the Cardinals, also notching career bests in holds (31), wins and earned run average along the way to a 5–2 record and 2.61 ERA. From May to July, King built a 30-game scoreless streak, another personal best. He also pitched 6 2/3 innings that postseason as St. Louis captured the National League pennant.

=== Colorado Rockies ===
King joined the Colorado Rockies for the 2006 season after a trade from St. Louis for outfielder Larry Bigbie and second baseman Aaron Miles.

=== Washington Nationals ===
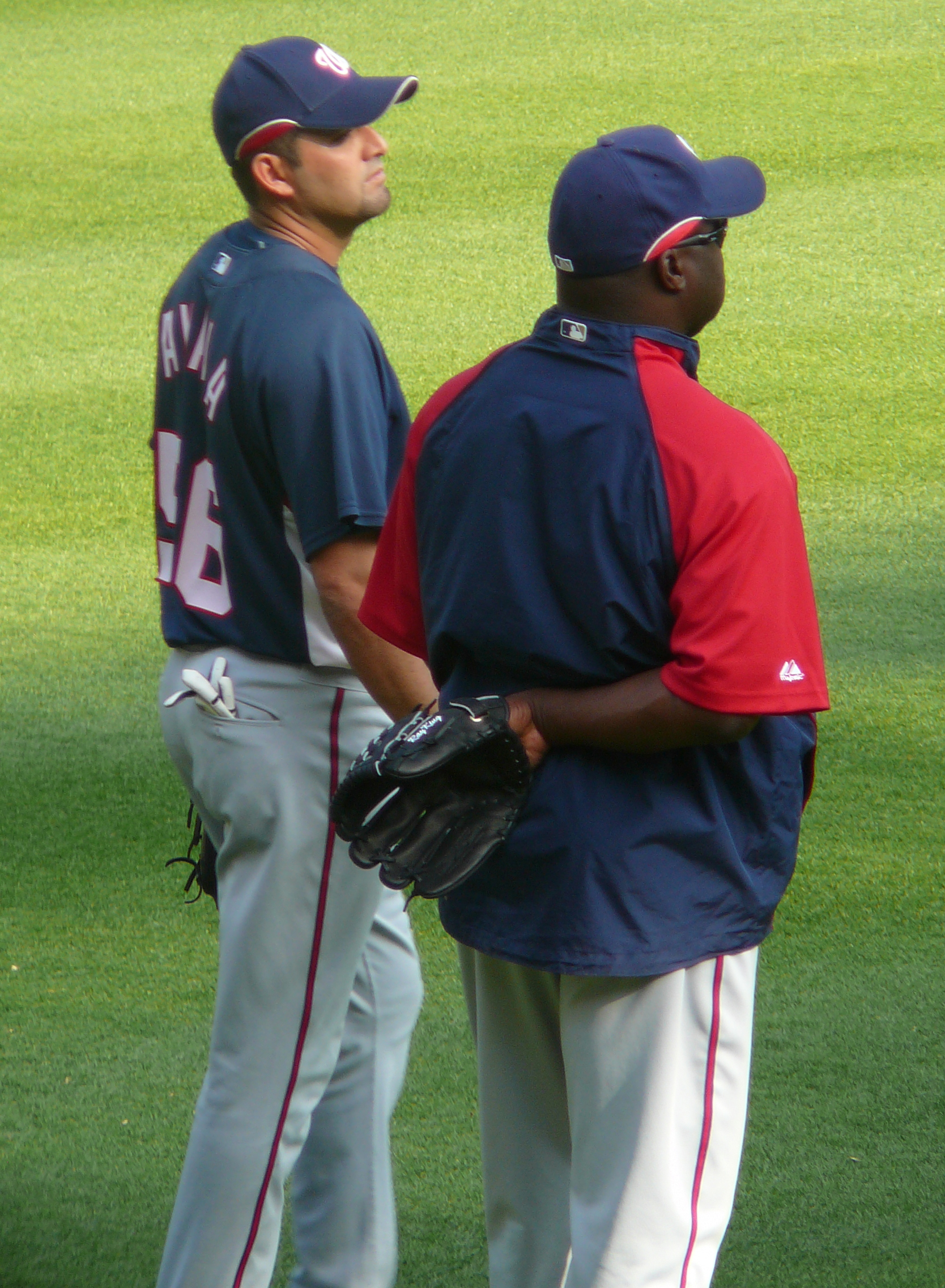
King (right) with teammate Luis Ayala in 2008

He joined the Washington Nationals on a minor league contract with an invitation to spring training the following winter. He made the Nationals 2007 Opening Day roster.

=== Milwaukee Brewers (second stint) ===
In September 2007, King was acquired by the Brewers in exchange for a player to be named later to help with their playoff run. King completed the 2007 season with a 1-1 record and a 4.76 ERA in 67 games. He became a free agent after the season.

=== Washington (second stint) ===
On November 30, 2007, King re-signed with the Nationals, to a minor league contract with an invitation to spring training. King made the Nationals roster and pitched in relief on opening day. King appeared in 12 games and went 0-0 with a 5.68 ERA during the month of April. He pitched in his final MLB game on April 23, allowing two runs in 2/3 of an inning. On April 24, King was optioned to Triple-A Columbus, but he refused the assignment and was granted free agency on April 29.

=== Chicago White Sox ===
On May 5, 2008, King signed a minor league contract with the Chicago White Sox, but was released on May 20 after only four Triple-A appearances.

=== Houston Astros ===
On May 29, 2008, King signed a minor league contract with the Houston Astros. He pitched in 32 games for the Triple-A Round Rock Express. He became a free agent at the end of the season.

== Scouting report ==
A lefty specialist with a durable arm, King ranked amongst the top ten National League relievers in appearances from 2001 through 2005. Armed with a late-moving, low 90s fastball and sharp breaking slider, King pitched to the bottom of the strike zone and allowed few home runs. He was also adept at holding runners, and fielding his position, having committed only seven errors in 577 career games.

== Facts ==
- Despite almost 600 career games, King had only 2 saves. He never started a game.
- King holds the second most number of single-season appearances for two organizations; the Atlanta Braves (80 appearances in 2003) and the Milwaukee Brewers (84 appearances in 2001).
- King earned Milwaukee's Manager's Award and the Amanda Curran Award for Community Service in 2004.
- King went 328 games without issuing an intentional walk, spanning over 4 years. This is the longest known streak of its kind. On August 6, 2007, King allowed a leadoff double to Ryan Klesko in the bottom of the 11th inning and intentionally walked Dave Roberts to end the streak. The Giants eventually scored, and King took the loss. While pitching for the Atlanta Braves, King threw a wild pitch on an intentional walk that scored the game's winning run from third base.

== Coaching career ==
On November 28, 2023, King was appointed the first pitching coach of the Oakland Ballers of the Pioneer League.
