= Brian McCann (baseball) =

American baseball catcher (born 1984)

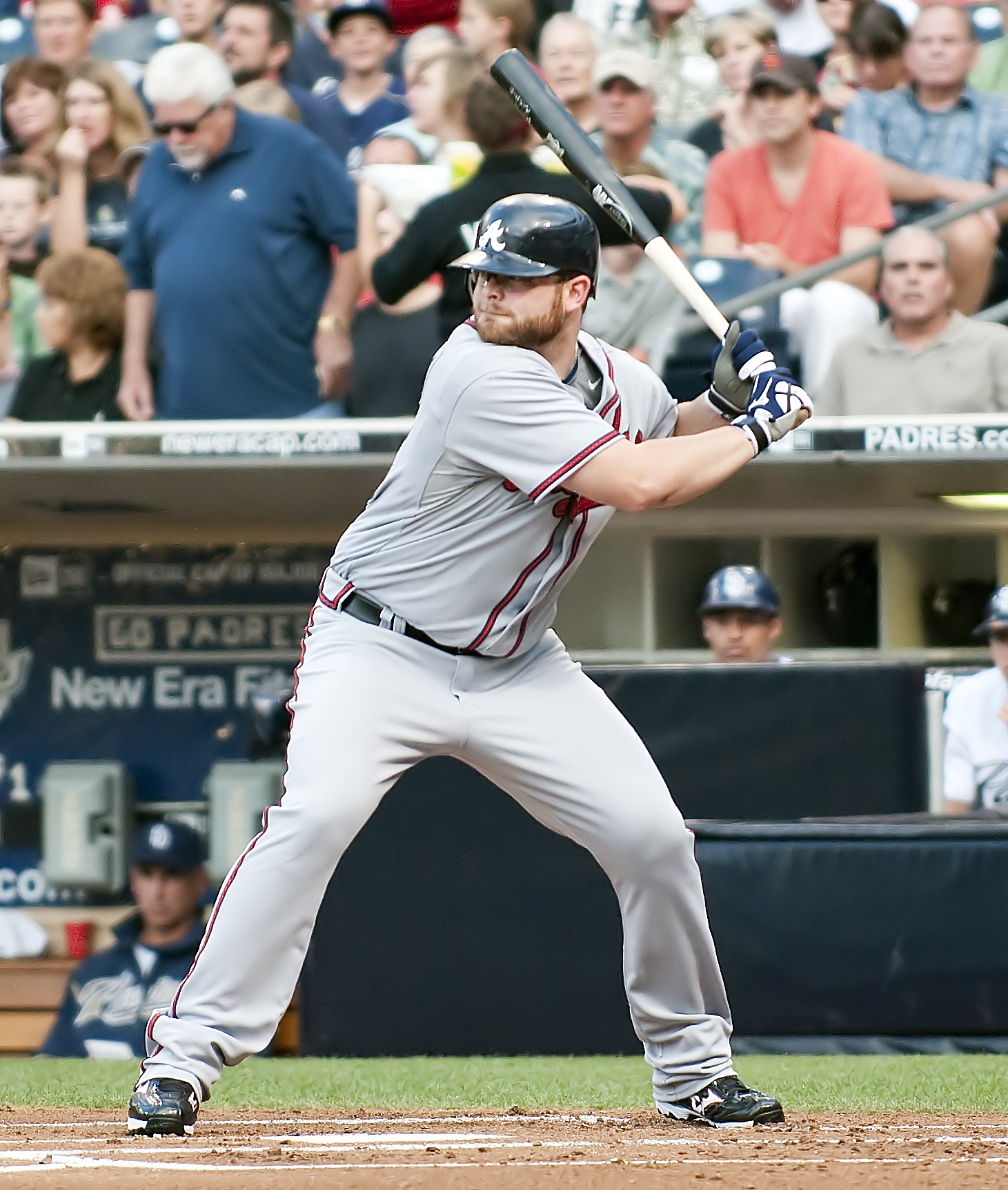
- McCann with the Atlanta Braves in 2009
- Catcher
- Born: February 20, 1984 (age 42); Athens, Georgia, U.S.
- Batted: Left Threw: Right

MLB debut
- June 10, 2005, for the Atlanta Braves

Last MLB appearance
- September 29, 2019, for the Atlanta Braves

MLB statistics
- Batting average: .262
- Home runs: 282
- Runs batted in: 1,018
- Stats at Baseball Reference

Teams
- Atlanta Braves (2005–2013); New York Yankees (2014–2016); Houston Astros (2017–2018); Atlanta Braves (2019)

Career highlights and awards
- 7× All-Star (2006–2011, 2013); World Series champion (2017); 6× Silver Slugger Award (2006, 2008–2011, 2015)

Brian Michael McCann (born February 20, 1984) is an American former professional baseball catcher. He played 15 seasons in Major League Baseball (MLB) for the Atlanta Braves, New York Yankees, and Houston Astros. A seven-time All-Star and a six-time Silver Slugger Award winner, he won the 2017 World Series with the Astros. He is one of only four catchers to win the Silver Slugger Award six times and the only catcher to win the award in both the National League and American League.

== Early life ==
McCann was born to Howard and Sherry McCann in Athens, Georgia. At the time, his father worked as an assistant baseball coach for the Georgia Bulldogs Baseball under Steve Webber and his mother worked at Athens Regional Hospital. Both of his parents attended Oswego High School in Oswego, New York, where they would later be inducted into the school's athletics hall of fame. McCann's father played college baseball at Mississippi State. Howard McCann would eventually become the head coach at Marshall.

McCann's older brother, Brad, played at Clemson and was selected in the sixth round of the 2004 Major League Baseball draft by the Florida Marlins but was out of professional baseball by 2007.

McCann attended Duluth High School in Duluth, Georgia. He was ranked the 26th best high school prospect by Baseball America and initially committed to play college baseball for Alabama.

== Professional career ==
=== Draft and minor leagues ===
The Atlanta Braves selected him in the second round of the 2002 MLB draft.

=== Atlanta Braves (2005–2013) ===
McCann made his MLB debut with the Braves on June 10, 2005 after playing in the minor leagues for the Rome Braves. A personal catcher for John Smoltz for most of the 2005 season, McCann hit his first home run in just his second regular-season game and became the first Braves player in franchise history to hit a home run in his first playoff at-bat on October 6, 2005. He accomplished the feat in the second inning of a 7–1 victory over Roger Clemens and the Houston Astros in Game 2 of the 2005 National League Division Series. McCann was named the everyday starter when the Braves traded Johnny Estrada to the Diamondbacks.

During the 2006 season, McCann hit .333 with 24 homers and 94 RBI. He led all Major League catchers in homers, and his RBI total was matched only by Jorge Posada and Victor Martinez. The Braves rewarded McCann by buying out his arbitration years with a six-year, $27.8 million contract during spring training in 2007.

McCann was selected to play in the 2006 MLB All-Star Game, in his first full major league season, and then again in both 2007 and 2008, making him the first Braves player ever to be selected to the National League All-Star team in each of his first three seasons. In 2008, he allowed more stolen bases than any other NL catcher, with 93.

Beginning in April 2009, McCann was bothered by blurry vision in his left eye, due to a slight vision change following 2007 LASIK surgery. He decided to opt for glasses when contact lenses proved uncomfortable. In May 2009, Oakley, Inc. made special glasses for McCann to correct the vision problem and allow for comfort under the catcher's mask. McCann remarked, "I need my Oakleys. I have to have the wraparounds for my peripheral vision." In 2009, he had more errors at catcher than any other major leaguer, with 12, and had the lowest fielding percentage among them (.988).

McCann was again selected for the All-Star Game in 2009 and 2010. In the latter, he was named the MVP after driving in all three of the National League's runs with a bases-clearing double in the seventh inning (driving in Scott Rolen, Matt Holliday, and Marlon Byrd), off of Chicago White Sox reliever Matt Thornton, giving the NL a 3–1 victory, its first in the midsummer classic since 1996. On August 29, McCann hit the first walk-off home run reviewed by instant replay. McCann hit a line drive to right field. The ball struck the top of the right field wall. The umpires called it a double, but McCann and Braves bench coach Chino Cadahia argued the call. The umpires went to go review instant replay. Replays showed that the ball struck the top of the right field wall, bounced into the stands, and then got onto the field. Thus, the umpires overturned the call and called it a walk-off home run. In 2010, he allowed more stolen bases than any other NL catcher, with 84.

During spring training, on March 9, 2011, McCann hit a line drive foul ball which struck minor league manager Luis Salazar, blinding him in the left eye. On May 17, 2011, McCann hit a ninth-inning, game-tying, pinch-hit home run and an 11th-inning game-winning two-run home run to defeat the Houston Astros 3–1. Also in 2011, he allowed 104 stolen bases, more than any other major league catcher.

On July 27, 2012, he became the first player since Jim Thome in 2007 to homer in six straight games versus an opponent. He did this on the same day Chipper Jones tied Pete Rose's major league record for extra base hits by a switch hitter.

On July 14, 2013, McCann was chosen by National League manager Bruce Bochy to replace injured Braves first baseman Freddie Freeman in the 2013 All-Star Game.

=== New York Yankees (2014–2016) ===
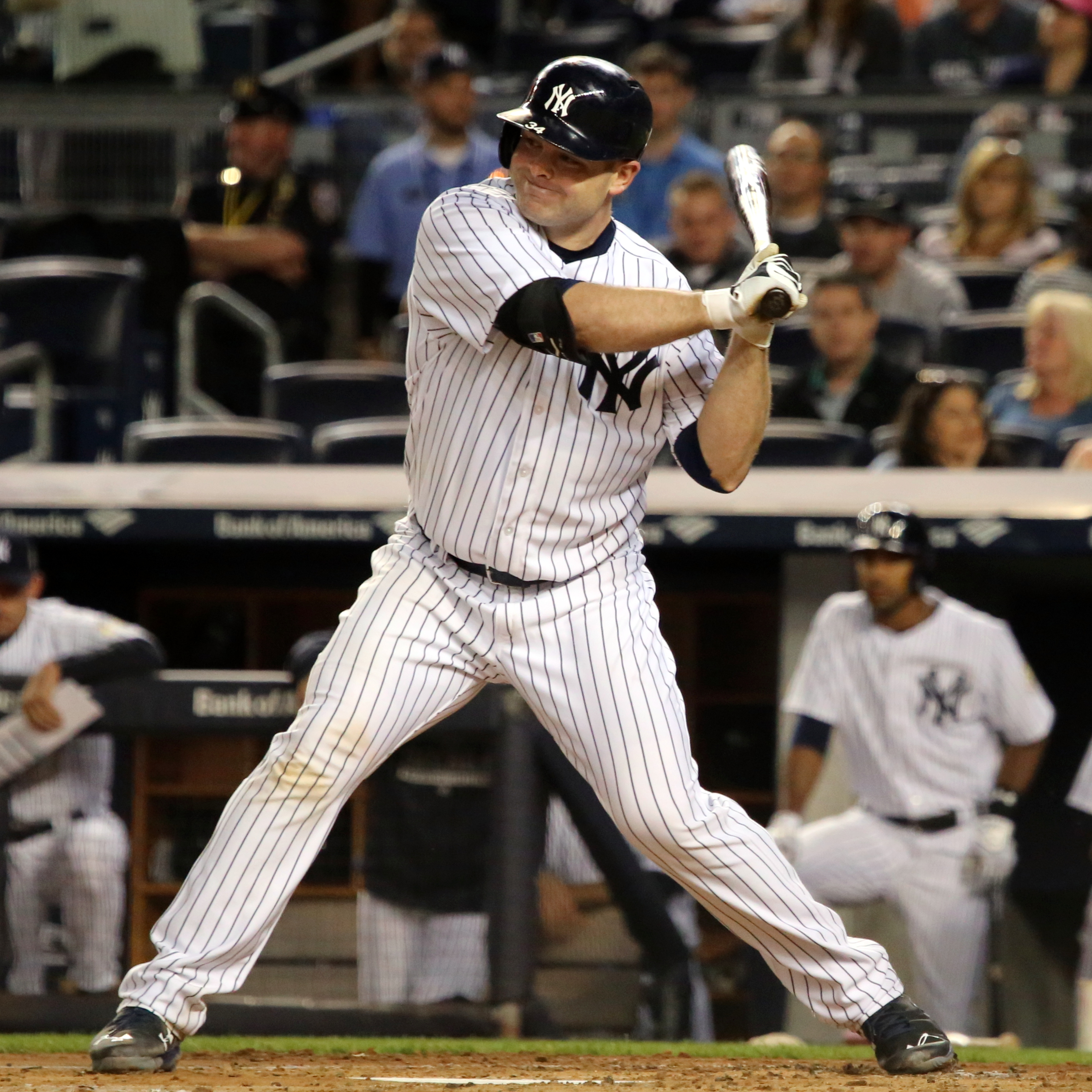
McCann batting for the New York Yankees in 2015

On November 23, 2013, McCann agreed to a five-year, $85 million contract with the New York Yankees, with a vesting option for a sixth year. The Yankees officially announced the deal on December 3. McCann wore the number 34 as number 16 is retired in honor of Whitey Ford.

On May 28, 2014, with limited options at first base, manager Joe Girardi slotted McCann into his first career start at first against the St. Louis Cardinals, going 2-for-4 with an RBI, a run scored, and a walk in a 7–4 Yankee win. On September 28, 2014, McCann entered the game against the Boston Red Sox as a pinch runner for Derek Jeter, after Jeter's final career hit. McCann led the Yankees in home runs (23) and RBI (75).

On September 6, 2015, McCann hit his career-high 25th home run of the season, a game-tying three-run shot off of Chris Archer of the Tampa Bay Rays. McCann ended the season with 26 home runs and a career-high 96 RBI. On November 12, 2015, he earned his sixth Silver Slugger Award at catcher (his first in the American League).

McCann struggled early on during the 2016 season. After the Yankees released Alex Rodriguez, rookie catcher Gary Sánchez was brought up to share in catching duties. After Sánchez had a big impact both on offense and defense, McCann became the primary designated hitter for the team. In 130 games, McCann batted .242 with 20 home runs and 58 RBI, the ninth season in a row in which McCann hit at least 20 home runs.

=== Houston Astros (2017–2018) ===
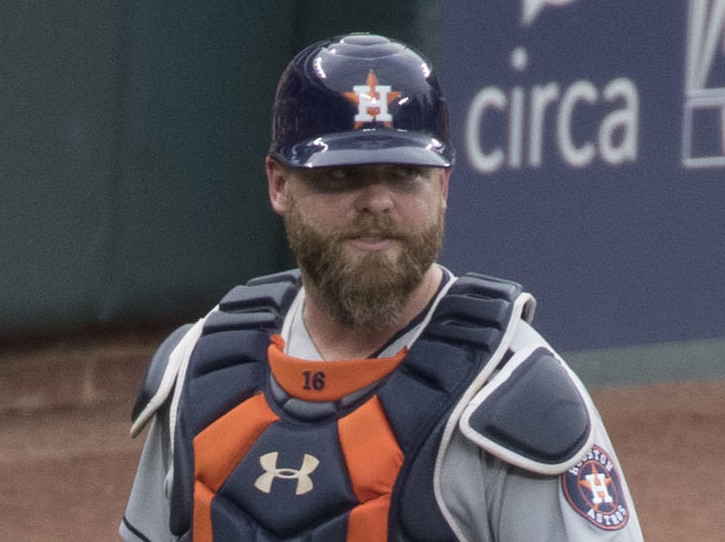
Brian McCann with the Houston Astros in 2017

On November 17, 2016, the Yankees traded McCann to the Houston Astros for Albert Abreu and Jorge Guzmán. On April 14, 2017, McCann became the 14th catcher to record over 10,000 putouts at the position. On May 21, Houston put McCann on the 7-day disabled list for players who have sustained a concussion. Playing in only 97 games, McCann hit 18 home runs. He failed to reach 20 home runs for the first time since 2007, ending his streak at nine consecutive 20-home run seasons.

In the 2017 American League Championship Series, McCann hit RBI doubles in Games 6 and 7 against his former team, the Yankees, to help the Astros reach the 2017 World Series. McCann caught every inning of the World Series, and hit 5-for-25 with a pivotal home run in Game 5 as the Astros defeated the Los Angeles Dodgers in 7 games.

On April 23, 2018, McCann became the 10th catcher all-time to record 11,000 career putouts at the position. For the season, he batted .212/.301/.339. He had the slowest baserunning sprint speed of all major league catchers, and the second-slowest speed of all major league players, at 22.7 feet/second.

On October 31, 2018, the Astros declined the 2019 option on his contract, making him a free agent.

=== Return to Atlanta (2019) ===
On November 26, 2018, McCann signed a one-year, $2 million contract with the Atlanta Braves, marking his return to the club. He was assigned uniform number 16, the number he wore during his first stint with the Braves; Charlie Culberson, who had worn the number during the 2018 season, switched his number to 8.

On June 14, 2019, McCann recorded his 1,000th career RBI, a walk-off single against the Philadelphia Phillies.

For the season, he batted .249/.323/.412. In 2019, he had the slowest sprint speed of all major league players, at 22.2 feet/second.

On October 9, 2019, shortly after the Braves' Game 5 loss in the National League Division Series against the St. Louis Cardinals, McCann announced his retirement from baseball.

=== 2009 World Baseball Classic ===
McCann played for the United States national baseball team in the 2009 World Baseball Classic.

== Personal life ==
McCann married Ashley Jarusinski in December 2007. Their first child, a son, was born in July 2012. Their second child, a daughter, was born in September 2013. They reside in Gwinnett County, Georgia.

In 2017, McCann's mother married the father of Mark Teixeira. McCann and Teixeira were teammates on the Braves from 2007 to 2008 and the Yankees from 2014 to 2016.

== Philanthropy ==
In 2008, McCann released a charity wine (The McCann Merlot) with 100% of his proceeds supporting the Rally Foundation for Childhood Cancer Research, an organization dedicated to raising funds to support pediatric cancer research and treatments. McCann also has baseball clinics for kids aged 5–18.

== See also ==
- Atlanta Braves award winners and league leaders
- List of Major League Baseball career home run leaders
- List of Major League Baseball career putouts as a catcher leaders
