= Jorge Sosa (baseball) =

Dominican baseball player (born 1977)

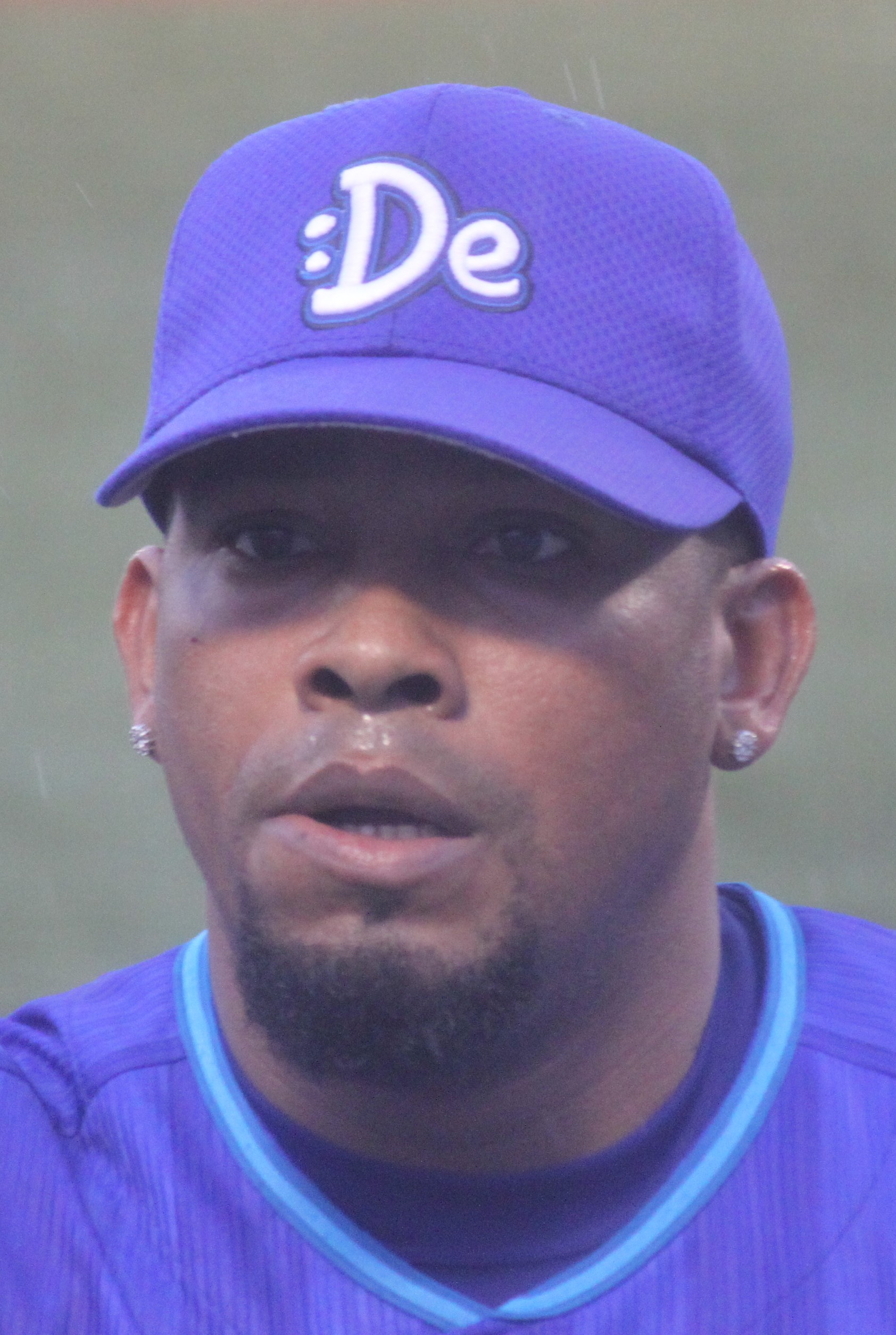
- Sosa with the Yokohama DeNA BayStars in 2013
- Pitcher
- Born: April 28, 1977 (age 49); Santo Domingo, Dominican Republic
- Batted: Right Threw: Right

Professional debut
- MLB: April 4, 2002, for the Tampa Bay Devil Rays
- NPB: April 7, 2012, for the Chunichi Dragons

Last appearance
- MLB: October 2, 2010, for the Florida Marlins
- NPB: July 1, 2014, for the Yokohama DeNA BayStars

MLB statistics
- Win–loss record: 44–53
- Earned run average: 4.72
- Strikeouts: 491

NPB statistics
- Win–loss record: 8–8
- Earned run average: 2.32
- Strikeouts: 118
- Stats at Baseball Reference

Teams
- Tampa Bay Devil Rays (2002–2004); Atlanta Braves (2005–2006); St. Louis Cardinals (2006); New York Mets (2007–2008); Washington Nationals (2009); Florida Marlins (2010); Chunichi Dragons (2012); Yokohama DeNA BayStars (2013–2014)

Jorge Bolivar Sosa (born April 28, 1977) is a Dominican former professional baseball pitcher. He played in Major League Baseball (MLB) for the Tampa Bay Devil Rays, Atlanta Braves, St. Louis Cardinals, New York Mets, Washington Nationals, and Florida Marlins. Sosa also played in Nippon Professional Baseball (NPB) for the Chunichi Dragons and Yokohama DeNA BayStars.

== Professional career ==
=== Minor leagues ===
Signed by the Colorado Rockies as an amateur free agent in 1995, Sosa spent his first five minor league seasons as an outfielder, but was converted to a pitcher when it was discovered that his arm strength was superior to his batting abilities. He throws his fastball as high as 99 MPH, but usually resides in the mid-90s. He also throws a curveball, slider, and a changeup.

Sosa spent time in the minor league organizations of the Rockies, Seattle Mariners, and Milwaukee Brewers before heading to the Tampa Bay Devil Rays as a Rule 5 draft pick. Sosa was traded from the Devil Rays to the Atlanta Braves for infielder Nick Green just before the 2005 season.

=== Atlanta Braves ===
==== 2005 ====
Sosa enjoyed a breakout season with the Braves in 2005. After starting the year in the bullpen, he was moved to the rotation in June following a rash of injuries to Braves starting pitchers. Sosa was excited about having the opportunity to start, and responded by going 11-3 as a starter and giving the rotation a major shot in the arm for the season's stretch run. For the year, Sosa was 13-3 with an impressive 2.55 ERA. More impressive, however, was his 8-0 record on the road. This earned him a start in game three of the National League Division Series in Houston, Texas against the Houston Astros.

Sosa pitched well in his postseason debut, but was outdueled by Astros ace Roy Oswalt in an eventual Houston win, finally handing Sosa a defeat away from Turner Field in Atlanta. Still, if not for his performance, it's likely that Atlanta's consecutive string of division championships (which reached 14 before the 2006 season, when the Braves' run finally ended) would have been snapped.

During his strong 2005 season, Sosa earned a reputation for his extraordinary ability to get out of jams he created for himself, as opposing batters hit just .194 with runners in scoring position, and .063 with the bases loaded.

==== 2006 ====
Sosa signed a one-year contract worth $2.2 million with the Braves, and entered the 2006 season back in the rotation. He had a poor start, going 2-9, and allowing a high number of home runs. His struggles, coupled with the Braves' unstable bullpen, prompted manager Bobby Cox to try Sosa in relief. Sosa was ineffective in that role and was designated for assignment on July 30, 2006. He was traded to the St. Louis Cardinals for minor league pitcher Rich Scalamandre on July 31, 2006. Sosa compiled a 5.28 ERA in his short stint with the Cardinals and was not included on the postseason roster, missing the Cardinals' victory in the 2006 World Series. He was not offered a 2007 contract, making him a free agent.

The pitcher hit his first career home run on April 6, 2006, off Jeff Fassero of the San Francisco Giants. The only other two hits Sosa recorded that season were also home runs. Sosa also pitched for the Dominican Republic in the 2006 World Baseball Classic.

=== New York Mets ===
==== 2007 ====
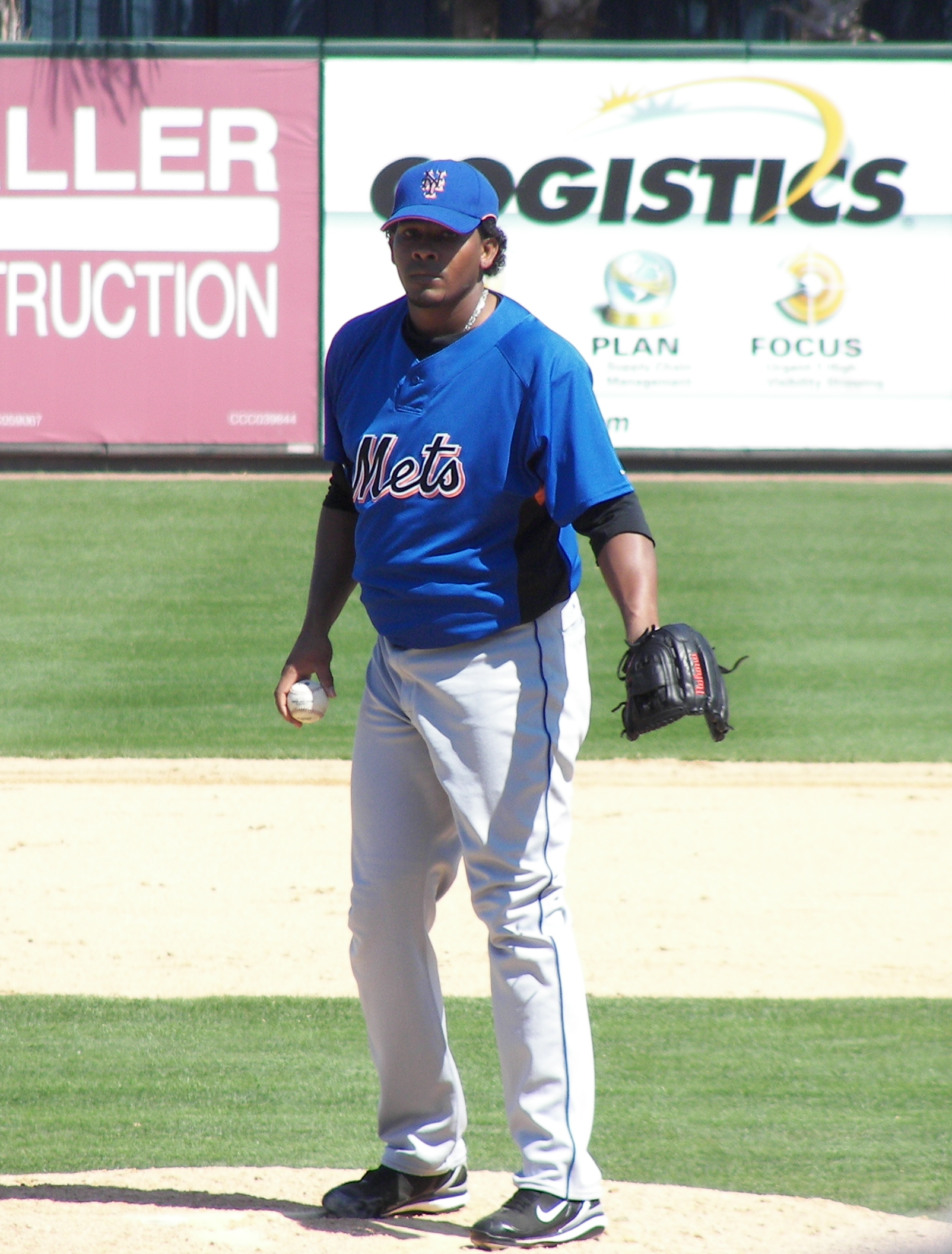
Sosa with the Mets

Sosa started the 2007 season with yet another one-year contract, this time for $1.25 million and as a member of the New York Mets, and playing for the Mets' Triple-A affiliate in New Orleans. One month into the season, Orlando Hernández suffered an injury, and Sosa was called up to take his place in the starting rotation while he was recovering.

On May 5, 2007, he made his season debut for the Mets, in a road game against the Arizona Diamondbacks. In a very solid performance, Sosa held the Diamondbacks scoreless for the first 6 innings of the game. After recording the first out in the 7th, he was pulled from the game when he allowed the next 2 men to reach bases. Both runners would eventually come around to score. However, the Mets bullpen allowed no further runs to be scored, securing a win for the Mets and for Sosa by the score of 6-2. Sosa's final stat line for his Mets debut was: 6 1/3 IP, 4 hits, 2 Runs, 2 ERs, 2 BBs, 3 Ks.

Sosa continued to pitch well in his games following his debut. In his first three starts with the Mets, he lasted more than 6 innings in every start and gave up no more than 2 runs in any of these appearances. As a result of his hot start, when the time came for Hernandez to come off the disabled list, the Mets chose to keep Sosa with the team and have him replace struggling rookie Mike Pelfrey in the starting rotation on a permanent basis.

On June 8, after pitching eight shutout innings, Sosa became the first Mets pitcher in team history to win six of his first seven starts with the team.

On July 2, The Mets placed Sosa on the 15-day disabled list, after he suffered a hamstring injury.

On July 17, Sosa returned from the DL to pitch well in a start against the San Diego Padres, giving up only 2 runs in 6 innings pitched. He ended up a hard-luck loser in the game as the Mets offense failed to provide him much run support, and the bullpen failed to keep the game close at the end. The Mets lost this game by a score of 5-1. Sosa made two starts after this game, but his performances in them were awful.

After July 31, Sosa was used as a relief pitcher instead of a starter, and pitcher Brian Lawrence replaced him in the starting rotation. Sosa performed well early on in this new role, posting a 1.69 ERA in the first 16 innings following his move to the bullpen. However, Sosa stumbled as a reliever in the final month of the season. His ERA in September was 6.57 in the 12 1/3 innings.

==== 2008 ====
Sosa began the 2008 season as a member of the Mets bullpen. His late 2007 struggles as a reliever continued, as Sosa allowed 17 earned runs in 21.2 innings pitched. On May 13, a day after giving up 4 earned runs in one inning against the Washington Nationals, Sosa was designated for assignment by the New York Mets. On May 21, Sosa was released.

On May 28, Sosa signed a minor league contract with the Houston Astros, but was released in July. On July 25, he signed another minor league contract with the Seattle Mariners, and was assigned to the Triple-A Tacoma Rainiers.

On August 22, Jorge was suspended 50 games by major league baseball for using an amphetamine that is used as a performance-enhancing drug.

=== Washington Nationals ===
==== 2009 ====
On December 18, 2008, Sosa signed a minor league contract with the Washington Nationals. He had his contract selected to the major league roster on July 31. On September 8, 2009, the Nationals released Sosa.

=== Florida Marlins ===
==== 2010 ====
On January 15, 2010, Sosa signed a minor-league deal with the Boston Red Sox. He was later released and signed with the Florida Marlins. He was a member of the starting rotation for the AAA minor league affiliate of the Marlins, until he was promoted to the Marlins on June 21. He cleared waivers and was sent outright to Triple-A on June 23. He had his contract selected to the major league roster again on July 21. He was designated for assignment a second time on August 3, he cleared waivers and was again sent outright to Triple-A the next day. He became a free agent following the season on November 7.

=== Leones de Yucatán ===
==== 2011 ====
On May 22, 2011, Sosa signed with the Leones de Yucatán of the Mexican League. He became a free agent following the season. In 10 starts 61 innings he went 5-4 with a 3.69 ERA and 43 strikeouts.

=== Nippon Professional Baseball ===
==== 2012 ====
On February 5, 2012, Sosa signed with the Chunichi Dragons of Nippon Professional Baseball. Sosa posted a 5-1 record with 4 saves and a 1.85 ERA during 2012. He became a free agent following the season.

==== 2013 ====
On December 26, 2012, Sosa signed with the Yokohama DeNA BayStars of Nippon Professional Baseball. Sosa started as a set-up man but was soon moved to the closer role after Shun Yamaguchi struggled. He posted a 3-4 record with 19 saves and a 1.79 ERA in 55 appearances. He became a free agent following the 2014 season.
