= Jim Brower =

American baseball player (born 1972)

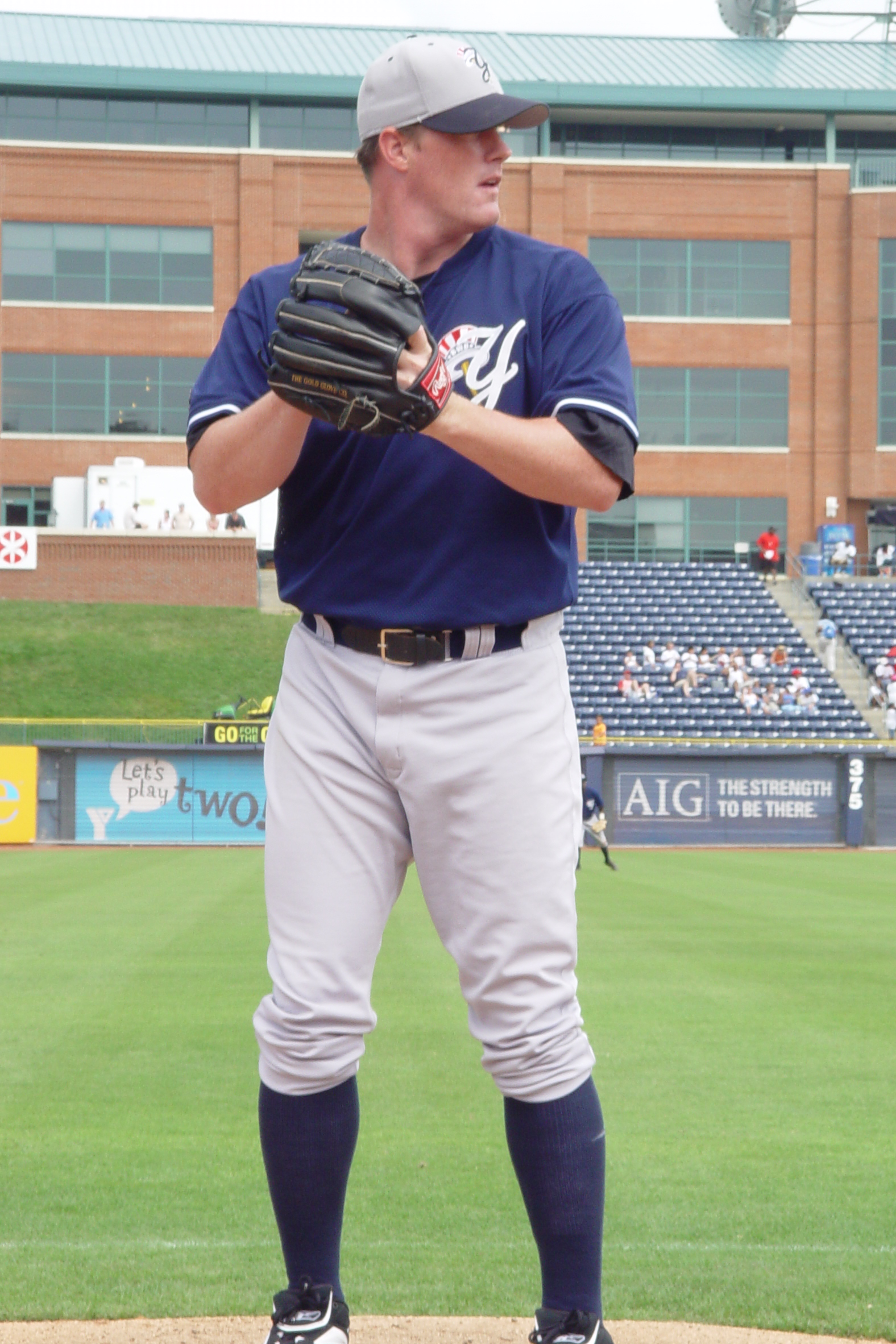
- Brower with the Scranton/Wilkes-Barre Yankees in 2008
- Pitcher
- Born: December 29, 1972 (age 53); Edina, Minnesota, U.S.
- Batted: Right Threw: Right

Professional debut
- MLB: September 5, 1999, for the Cleveland Indians
- NPB: August 3, 2008, for the Hiroshima Toyo Carp

Last appearance
- MLB: August 14, 2007, for the New York Yankees
- NPB: September 16, 2008, for the Hiroshima Toyo Carp

MLB statistics
- Win–loss record: 33–32
- Earned run average: 4.67
- Strikeouts: 397

NPB statistics
- Win–loss record: 0–2
- Earned run average: 3.98
- Strikeouts: 13
- Stats at Baseball Reference

Teams
- As player: Cleveland Indians (1999–2000); Cincinnati Reds (2001–2002); Montreal Expos (2002); San Francisco Giants (2003–2005); Atlanta Braves (2005); San Diego Padres (2006); Baltimore Orioles (2006); New York Yankees (2007); Hiroshima Toyo Carp (2008); As coach: Seattle Mariners (2018–2019)

James Robert Brower (born December 29, 1972) is an American former professional baseball pitcher. He played for eight Major League Baseball (MLB) teams: the Cleveland Indians (1999-2000), Cincinnati Reds (2001-2002), Montreal Expos (2002), San Francisco Giants (2003-2004), Atlanta Braves (2005), Baltimore Orioles (2006), San Diego Padres (2006), and New York Yankees (2007).

== Playing career ==
Brower was originally drafted by the Pittsburgh Pirates out of Minnetonka High School in the 56th round of the 1991 amateur draft, but did not sign, choosing instead to attend the University of Minnesota, where he was named a Big Ten Conference All-Star and Dave Winfield Award recipient in 1994. He was drafted by the Texas Rangers in the 6th round of the 1994 draft, and signed on June 5. He spent nearly four years in the Rangers system before being released early in 1998. He quickly signed with the Cleveland Indians, spending the 1998 season in AA, then splitting the next two seasons between the Indians and their AAA club.

Brower was traded to the Cincinnati Reds following the 2000 season. In June 2002, the Reds traded him to the Montreal Expos for pitcher Bruce Chen. In March 2003, he was traded to San Francisco in the trade that sent Liván Hernández to the Expos. In 2004, he tied the Giants' team record and led MLB in appearances with 89.

Following a slow start to the 2005 season, Brower was released by the Giants on June 12, and signed by the Atlanta Braves. He signed a minor league contract with the Baltimore Orioles in February 2006 and made the Opening Day roster, but was later released. On May 11, Brower signed with the San Diego Padres, who traded him to the Florida Marlins on August 1. He did not pitch for the Marlins at the Major League level, but appeared in 16 games for their AAA club.

Brower signed a minor league contract with the Pittsburgh Pirates prior to the 2007 season, but was given his release to sign a minor league contract by the New York Yankees, and served as the closer for their AAA club, posting a 1.65 earned run average and earning 20 saves. On August 6, 2007, he was promoted by the Yankees, replacing Mike Myers on the 40-man roster.

In December, Brower agreed to a minor league contract with the Cincinnati Reds. On May 30, 2008, Brower was traded by the Reds to the Chicago Cubs for cash considerations. Brower was released in July and signed with the Houston Astros. After making only two appearances with Triple-A Round Rock, Brower had his rights sold to the Hiroshima Toyo Carp of Nippon Professional Baseball. He split the 2009 season between three teams: the Long Island Ducks of the Atlantic League, the American Association's St. Paul Saints, and the Venezuelan team Caribes de Anzoátegui. Brower pitched one final season in 2010, with Telemarket Rimini of the Italian Baseball League before ending his playing career.

== Coaching career ==
In 2010, Brower was hired by the Kansas City Royals to be a minor league pitching coach.

In 2016, Brower became the Minor League Pitching Coordinator for the Chicago Cubs.

The Seattle Mariners hired him to be their bullpen coach on the major league staff before the 2018 season and he was fired after the 2019 season.

== Personal life ==
Brower and his wife had their first child in August 2007. Currently he resides in Deephaven, MN.
