= Chris Reitsma =

Canadian-American baseball player (born 1977)

- Pitcher
- Born: December 31, 1977 (age 48); Minneapolis, Minnesota, U.S.
- Batted: Right Threw: Right

MLB debut
- April 4, 2001, for the Cincinnati Reds

Last MLB appearance
- July 29, 2007, for the Seattle Mariners

MLB statistics
- Win–loss record: 32–46
- Earned run average: 4.70
- Strikeouts: 359
- Stats at Baseball Reference

Teams
- Cincinnati Reds (2001–2003); Atlanta Braves (2004–2006); Seattle Mariners (2007)

Christopher Michael Reitsma (born December 31, 1977) is a Canadian American former professional baseball right-handed pitcher. He played seven seasons in Major League Baseball (MLB), from 2001 until 2007, with the Cincinnati Reds, Atlanta Braves, and Seattle Mariners.

== Professional career ==
=== Red Sox and Reds ===
Reitsma, drafted in the first round of the 1996 MLB draft by the Boston Red Sox (34th overall), made his MLB debut in 2001 for the Cincinnati Reds. After spending three seasons with the Reds as both a starter and reliever, the Atlanta Braves traded for him on March 26, 2004, to bolster their bullpen.

=== Atlanta Braves ===
Reitsma was used as a setup man for Atlanta's closer John Smoltz in 2004. He appeared in 84 games and did a serviceable job, however he was shelled in Game 5 of the 2004 National League Division Series against the Houston Astros, allowing the game to be broken open, and essentially ending the Braves' season.

In 2005, with newly acquired closer Danny Kolb getting off to a rough start, the Braves elected to use Reitsma as the closer rather than returning John Smoltz to that role. Reitsma did relatively well, earning 15 saves, but on the last day of non-waiver trades, the Braves traded for relief pitcher Kyle Farnsworth from the Detroit Tigers. Farnsworth soon replaced Reitsma as the closer, sending Reitsma back to being a setup man.

With the Braves unable to retain Farnsworth, who signed with the New York Yankees following the 2005 season, the team feverishly searched to fill the closer's role through free agency or a trade. However, they were not able to find anyone to fill the hole left by Farnsworth's departure, and because of this, Reitsma had numerous chances to be the Braves' closer in 2006. However, he proved to be ineffective in the job throughout his abbreviated season.

On July 3, 2006, Reitsma was placed on the disabled list with ulnar neuritis in his right arm. He spent the rest of the season on the disabled list. Bob Wickman was brought in to replace Reitsma near the trade deadline, and after performing well, Wickman was signed to a contract in the offseason by the Braves.

=== Seattle Mariners ===
Reitsma was non-tendered by the Braves on December 12, 2006. The Seattle Mariners signed him to a one-year deal with a club option for 2008 on January 5, 2007, to be their setup man for incumbent closer J. J. Putz. Reitmsa's 2007 season was marred by injuries, making his last appearance on July 29. He was placed on the 15-day disabled list on July 30 and was transferred to the 60-day disabled list on September 4, ending his season. After the season, his club option was not picked up and Reitsma became a free agent. On January 10, 2008, he re-signed with the Mariners to a minor league contract with an invitation to spring training. However, he never pitched with the Mariners in 2008, and has not played professionally since.

== International career ==
Reitsma was selected Canada national baseball team at the 2006 World Baseball Classic and 2008 Beijing Olympic Games.

== Pitching style ==
Reitsma featured three pitches, a sinking fastball which sometimes would induce groundballs, as well a changeup. He also possessed a big, looping curveball which he did not throw as much as his fastball and changeup. Atlanta Braves coaches attempted to have Reitsma focus on only two pitches in an attempt to simplify his delivery.

== Personal life ==
He is married to Janelle and has three daughters, Kylie, Emily and Allyson. He graduated from Calgary Christian High School in Calgary, Alberta, Canada, with three varsity letters in basketball. He is also a dual citizen of both Canada and the United States. He is a born-again Christian.

=== The Grim Reitsma ===
Reitsma's team nickname on the Mariners was "The Grim Reitsma". Reitsma himself was apparently the last to know his bullpen brethren had taken to wearing T-shirts with his name on them. The relievers began wearing gray shirts with the words "The Grim Reitsma" on them, complete with a maple leaf logo — Reitsma is Canadian — and the picture of a Grim Reaper.

Seattle reliever George Sherrill and strength coach Allen Wirtala had the shirts made up shortly after a game at Yankee Stadium. Reitsma had gotten up in the bullpen when a fan stood up in the stands and shouted, "Grim Reitsma!" Reitsma went on the disabled list shortly after. "I didn't even know about the shirts until I got back", he said. "I saw everybody wearing them."

=== Philanthropy ===
Reitsma also performs generous charity work in the off season with the mentally and physically handicapped.

On June 20, 2008, Reitsma was named as spokesman for the Parkinson's Society of Southern Alberta's SuperWalk fundraiser. Reitsma's father Mike, former senior pastor of River Park Church in Calgary, was diagnosed with Parkinson's in 1985.

Chris is the founder of Reitsma's Relievers, whose mission is to benefit at-risk children, youth and their families by providing assistance, programs and events designed to build self-esteem, provide unique life changing opportunities and help them to set and achieve their life goals.
