= John Foster (baseball) =

American baseball player and coach (born 1978)

Athletics
- Relief pitcher / Coach
- Born: May 17, 1978 (age 47); Stockton, California, U.S.
- Batted: Left Threw: Left

MLB debut
- May 14, 2002, for the Atlanta Braves

Last MLB appearance
- October 2, 2005, for the Atlanta Braves

MLB statistics
- Win–loss record: 7–2
- Earned run average: 4.90
- Strikeouts: 54
- Stats at Baseball Reference

Teams
- As player: Atlanta Braves (2002); Milwaukee Brewers (2003); Atlanta Braves (2005); As coach: Lehman College (2009–2010); Chinatrust Brothers (2017–2023)

Career highlights and awards
- 2× Taiwan Series champion (2021–2022)

John Norman Foster (born May 17, 1978) is an American former professional baseball pitcher and current coach. He played in Major League Baseball (MLB) for the Atlanta Braves and Milwaukee Brewers. After retiring as a player, Foster coached summer league and college baseball. From 2017 to 2024, Foster coached in Taiwan's Chinese Professional Baseball League (CPBL), for the CTBC Brothers. He currently serves as a minor league pitching rehab coordinator for the Athletics.

== Career ==
Foster played in Western Little League, graduated from Stagg High School, before playing college baseball at San Joaquin Delta College for two years. He subsequently transferred to continue his baseball career with Lewis–Clark State College, where he won the 1999 NAIA World Series. He was drafted by the Atlanta Braves in the 25th round of the 1999 Major League Baseball draft. Foster advanced steadily through the Braves' minor league system, starting with a 4–1 record and 1.38 ERA with the Danville Braves. The following year, he pitched with the Myrtle Beach Pelicans, going 2–1 with a 1.85 ERA for Myrtle Beach. During the 2001 season, Foster was 8–7 with a 3.02 ERA for the Greenville Braves. Foster began his big league career with the Atlanta Braves in 2002, after being called up from the Triple-A Richmond Braves. In his rookie season, he went 1–0 with a 10.80 earned run average and 6 strikeouts.

On December 16, 2002, Foster was traded, along with Wes Helms, to the Milwaukee Brewers for Ray King. With Milwaukee, he went 2–0, with a 4.71 ERA and 16 strikeouts.

In 2005, after being picked by the Chicago Cubs in the Rule 5 draft in 2004 and undergoing surgery on a torn labrum, Foster returned to the Braves when his contract was purchased from Triple-A Richmond.

Foster was signed by the Atlanta Braves during the 2005 season and recalled to the major leagues after Opening Day left-hander Tom Martin struggled in four appearances. During the 2005 season, Foster posted a career low 4.15 ERA while working 34.2 innings in 62 games (both career highs). He also had career highs in walks (19) and strikeouts (32), and recorded his only career save.

Foster missed the 2006 season with an elbow injury. On October 11, 2006, he was released by the Atlanta Braves. Foster signed a minor league contract for the 2008 season with the Kansas City Royals, and was invited to spring training. In late March 2009 at the end of spring training, Foster retired from professional baseball.

== Coaching career ==
In 2009, Foster served as the pitching coach for the Newport Gulls of the New England Collegiate Baseball League. The following summer, he coached the Cape Cod Baseball League's Wareham Gatemen.

He coached NCAA Division III Lehman College during the 2009 and 2010 seasons. Starting in 2012, Foster worked with the Monroe University baseball program as a junior varsity coach. He was elevated to a player development role in 2014. That year, Foster was also named coach of the East Texas Pump Jacks. In 2017, Foster became the pitching coach of the Chinatrust Brothers of the Chinese Professional Baseball League. On May 10, 2023, Foster shifted to the position of farm director for pitchers. At the start of the 2025 regular season Foster and his family returned to the United States, and he began working as a minor league pitching rehab coordinator for the Athletics.

== Personal life ==
Foster married Anisha after the 2005 season ended. The couple raised three children.

== See also ==
- Rule 5 draft results
