= 2005 Colorado Rockies season =

2005 Colorado Rockies
- League: National League
- Division: West
- Ballpark: Coors Field
- City: Denver, Colorado
- Record: 67–95 (.414)
- Divisional place: 5th
- Owner: Jerry McMorris
- General manager: Dan O'Dowd
- Manager: Clint Hurdle
- Television: KTVD; Fox Sports Rocky Mountain (George Frazier, Drew Goodman)
- Radio: KOA (AM) (Jack Corrigan, Jeff Kingery)
- Stats: ESPN.com; Baseball Reference

The Colorado Rockies' 2005 season was the 13th for the Rockies, attempting to win the National League West. Clint Hurdle was the manager. They played home games at Coors Field. They finished with a record of 67–95, last in the NL West. The team have their lowest home attendance with below 2 million fans in total largely due to poor play.

In their 8–0 loss to the Washington Nationals on August 13, the Rockies had 19 baserunners without scoring a run, an MLB record for a 9-inning game.

== Offseason ==
- December 18, 2004: Danny Ardoin was signed as a free agent by the Colorado Rockies.
- January 6, 2005: Desi Relaford and Dustan Mohr were signed as free agents by the Colorado Rockies.
- March 30, 2005: Charles Johnson was traded by the Colorado Rockies with Chris Narveson to the Boston Red Sox for Byung-hyun Kim and cash.

== Regular season ==
=== Season standings ===
==== National League West ====
NL West
| Team | W | L | Pct. | GB | Home | Road |
|---|---|---|---|---|---|---|
| San Diego Padres | 82 | 80 | .506 | — | 46‍–‍35 | 36‍–‍45 |
| Arizona Diamondbacks | 77 | 85 | .475 | 5 | 36‍–‍45 | 41‍–‍40 |
| San Francisco Giants | 75 | 87 | .463 | 7 | 37‍–‍44 | 38‍–‍43 |
| Los Angeles Dodgers | 71 | 91 | .438 | 11 | 40‍–‍41 | 31‍–‍50 |
| Colorado Rockies | 67 | 95 | .414 | 15 | 40‍–‍41 | 27‍–‍54 |

==== Record vs. opponents ====
2005 National League record Source: MLB Standings Grid – 2005
| Team | AZ | ATL | CHC | CIN | COL | FLA | HOU | LAD | MIL | NYM | PHI | PIT | SD | SF | STL | WAS | AL |
|---|---|---|---|---|---|---|---|---|---|---|---|---|---|---|---|---|---|
| Arizona | — | 3–3 | 5–2 | 2–4 | 11–7 | 2–4 | 3–3 | 13–5 | 2–4 | 1–6 | 3–4 | 3–4 | 10–9 | 7–11 | 2–5 | 2–4 | 8–10 |
| Atlanta | 3–3 | — | 6–1 | 7–3 | 2–4 | 10–8 | 5–1 | 3–3 | 3–3 | 13–6 | 9–10 | 4–3 | 1–5 | 4–2 | 3–3 | 10–9 | 7–8 |
| Chicago | 2–5 | 1–6 | — | 6–9 | 4–3 | 5–4 | 9–7 | 4–2 | 7–9 | 2–4 | 2–4 | 11–5 | 4–3 | 5–2 | 10–6 | 1–5 | 6–9 |
| Cincinnati | 4–2 | 3–7 | 9–6 | — | 3–3 | 2–4 | 4–12 | 3–4 | 6–10 | 3–3 | 3–4 | 9–7 | 4–2 | 3–5 | 5–11 | 5–1 | 7-8 |
| Colorado | 7–11 | 4–2 | 3–4 | 3–3 | — | 3–3 | 1–5 | 11–8 | 1–5 | 3–4 | 2–4 | 3–7 | 7–11 | 7–11 | 4–4 | 2–4 | 6–9 |
| Florida | 4–2 | 8–10 | 4–5 | 4–2 | 3–3 | — | 4–3 | 5–2 | 3–4 | 8–10 | 9–10 | 3–4 | 2–4 | 4–2 | 3–4 | 9–9 | 10–5 |
| Houston | 3–3 | 1–5 | 7–9 | 12–4 | 5–1 | 3-4 | — | 4–2 | 10–5 | 5–5 | 6–0 | 9–7 | 4–3 | 3–4 | 5–11 | 5–2 | 7–8 |
| Los Angeles | 5–13 | 3–3 | 2–4 | 4–3 | 8–11 | 2–5 | 2–4 | — | 5–1 | 3–3 | 3–3 | 5–2 | 11–7 | 9–10 | 2–5 | 2–4 | 5–13 |
| Milwaukee | 4–2 | 3–3 | 9–7 | 10–6 | 5–1 | 4–3 | 5–10 | 1–5 | — | 3–3 | 4–5 | 9–7 | 3–4 | 4–3 | 5–11 | 4–4 | 8–7 |
| New York | 6–1 | 6–13 | 4–2 | 3–3 | 4–3 | 10–8 | 5–5 | 3–3 | 3–3 | — | 11–7 | 3–3 | 4–2 | 3–3 | 2–5 | 11–8 | 5–10 |
| Philadelphia | 4-3 | 10–9 | 4–2 | 4–3 | 4–2 | 10–9 | 0–6 | 3–3 | 5–4 | 7–11 | — | 4–3 | 6–0 | 5–1 | 4–2 | 11–8 | 7–8 |
| Pittsburgh | 4–3 | 3–4 | 5–11 | 7–9 | 7–3 | 4–3 | 7–9 | 2–5 | 7–9 | 3–3 | 3–4 | — | 3–4 | 2–4 | 4–12 | 1–5 | 5–7 |
| San Diego | 9–10 | 5–1 | 3–4 | 2–4 | 11–7 | 4–2 | 3–4 | 7–11 | 4–3 | 2–4 | 0–6 | 4–3 | — | 12–6 | 4–3 | 5–1 | 7–11 |
| San Francisco | 11–7 | 2–4 | 2–5 | 5–3 | 11–7 | 2–4 | 4–3 | 10–9 | 3–4 | 3–3 | 1–5 | 4–2 | 6–12 | — | 2–4 | 3–3 | 6–12 |
| St. Louis | 5–2 | 3–3 | 6–10 | 11–5 | 4–4 | 4-3 | 11–5 | 5–2 | 11–5 | 5–2 | 2–4 | 12–4 | 3–4 | 4–2 | — | 4–2 | 10–5 |
| Washington | 4–2 | 9–10 | 5–1 | 1–5 | 4–2 | 9-9 | 2–5 | 4–2 | 4–4 | 8–11 | 8–11 | 5–1 | 1–5 | 3–3 | 2–4 | — | 12–6 |

=== Transactions ===
- June 7, 2005: Troy Tulowitzki was drafted by the Colorado Rockies in the 1st round of the 2005 amateur draft. Player signed June 10, 2005.
- July 13, 2005: Preston Wilson was traded by the Colorado Rockies to the Washington Nationals for Zach Day, J.J. Davis, and cash.
- July 13, 2005: Joe Kennedy was traded by the Colorado Rockies with Jay Witasick to the Oakland Athletics for Eric Byrnes and Omar Quintanilla.
- July 28, 2005: Shawn Chacón was traded by the Colorado Rockies to the New York Yankees for Ramón Ramírez and Eduardo Sierra (minors).
- July 30, 2005: Eric Byrnes was traded by the Colorado Rockies to the Baltimore Orioles for Larry Bigbie.
- July 31, 2005: Desi Relaford was released by the Colorado Rockies.
- August 5, 2005: Sun-Woo Kim was selected off waivers by the Colorado Rockies from the Washington Nationals.

=== Major League debuts ===
- Batters:
  - Jeff Baker (Apr 4)
  - Cory Sullivan (Apr 4)
  - Eddy Garabito (May 27)
  - Ryan Shealy (Jun 14)
  - Ryan Spilborghs (Jul 16)
  - Omar Quintanilla (Jul 31)
- Pitchers:
  - Ryan Speier (Apr 4)
  - Marcos Carvajal (Apr 6)
  - Mike Esposito (Sep 21)

=== Roster ===
2005 Colorado Rockies
Roster
| Pitchers: 30 José Acevedo; 14 Matt Anderson; 62 Marcos Carvajal; 34 Shawn Chacón; 28 Aaron Cook; 50 David Cortés; 45 Zach Day; 18 Mike DeJean; 47 Scott Dohmann; 35 Mike Esposito; 26 Jeff Francis; 40 Brian Fuentes; 32 Jason Jennings; 37 Joe Kennedy; 49 Byung-hyun Kim; 51 Sun-Woo Kim; 51 Aquilino López; 45 Javier López; 58 Dan Miceli; 39 Blaine Neal; 46 Bobby Seay; 51 Allan Simpson; 23 Ryan Speier; 71 Chin-hui Tsao; 54 Randy Williams; 41 Jay Witasick; 16 Jamey Wright | Catchers: 55 Danny Ardoin; 7 J. D. Closser; 20 Todd Greene; Infielders: 15 Alfredo Amézaga; 27 Garrett Atkins; 10 Jeff Baker; 12 Clint Barmes; 25 Eddy Garabito; 4 Luis González; 17 Todd Helton; 1 Anderson Machado; 6 Aaron Miles; 8 Omar Quintanilla; 8 Desi Relaford; 38 Ryan Shealy | Outfielders: 34 Larry Bigbie; 35 Eric Byrnes; 21 Choo Freeman; 11 Brad Hawpe; 5 Matt Holliday; 22 Dustan Mohr; 3 Jorge Piedra; 25 Michael Restovich; 19 Ryan Spilborghs; 31 Cory Sullivan; 44 Preston Wilson; Other batters: 48 Tim Olson | Manager: 13 Clint Hurdle; Coaches: 36 Bob Apodaca (pitching); 29 Dave Collins (first base); 52 Duane Espy (hitting); 2 Mike Gallego (third base); 53 Rick Mathews (bullpen); 9 Jamie Quirk (bench); 56 Mark Strittmatter (bullpen catcher) |

=== Game log ===
2005 Game Log
April (6–15)

| # | Date | Opponent | Score | Win | Loss | Save | Attendance | Record |
|---|---|---|---|---|---|---|---|---|
| 1 | April 4 | Padres | 12–10 | Speier (1–0) | Hoffman (0–1) | | 47,661 | 1–0 |
| 2 | April 6 | Padres | 14–6 | Hammond (1–0) | Jennings (0–1) | | 20,721 | 1–1 |
| 3 | April 8 | @ Giants | 10–8 | Christiansen (1–0) | Fuentes (0–1) | | 37,015 | 1–2 |
| 4 | April 9 | @ Giants | 4–2 | Eyre (1–0) | Dohmann (0–1) | Benítez (2) | 37,993 | 1–3 |
| 5 | April 10 | @ Giants | 11–4 | Schmidt (2–0) | Kennedy (0–1) | | 38,588 | 1–4 |
| 6 | April 11 | @ Diamondbacks | 2–0 | Halsey (1–0) | Jennings (0–2) | Lyon (3) | 18,742 | 1–5 |
| 7 | April 12 | @ Diamondbacks | 4–2 | Webb (2–0) | Fuentes (0–2) | Lyon (4) | 37,355 | 1–6 |
| 8 | April 13 | @ Diamondbacks | 5–2 | Estes (1–0) | B. Kim (0–1) | Bruney (1) | 19,272 | 1–7 |
| 9 | April 15 | Giants | 13–6 | Lowry (1–0) | Wright (0–1) | | 22,551 | 1–8 |
| 10 | April 16 | Giants | 5–4 | Kennedy (1–1) | Schmidt (2–1) | Tsao (1) | 23,439 | 2–8 |
| 11 | April 17 | Giants | 8–6 | Herges (1–0) | B. Kim (0–2) | Benítez (3) | 27,107 | 2–9 |
| 12 | April 18 | Diamondbacks | 5–3 | Webb (3–0) | Speier (1–1) | Lyon (5) | 18,563 | 2–10 |
| 13 | April 19 | Diamondbacks | 8–1 | Francis (1–0) | Estes (1–1) | | 18,235 | 3–10 |
| 14 | April 20 | @ Phillies | 7–4 | Wright (1–1) | Lidle (0–2) | | 25,961 | 4–10 |
| 15 | April 21 | @ Phillies | 6–3 | Lieber (4–0) | Kennedy (1–2) | Wagner (3) | 21,749 | 4–11 |
| 16 | April 22 | Dodgers | 9–1 | Jennings (1–2) | Weaver (2–1) | | 20,321 | 5–11 |
| 17 | April 23 | Dodgers | 8–6 | Chacón (1–0) | Pérez (3–1) | Tsao (2) | 30,272 | 6–11 |
| 18 | April 24 | Dodgers | 8–6 | Carrara (3–0) | B. Kim (0–3) | Brazobán (5) | 28,117 | 6–12 |
| 19 | April 26 | Marlins | 9–3 | Beckett (4–1) | Wright (1–2) | | 18,855 | 6–13 |
| 20 | April 29 | @ Dodgers | 6–3 | Pérez (4–1) | Jennings (1–3) | Brazobán (6) | 40,150 | 6–14 |
| 21 | April 30 | @ Dodgers | 6–2 | Penny (1–0) | Kennedy (1–3) | Brazobán (7) | 54,123 | 6–15 |

May (9–20)

| # | Date | Opponent | Score | Win | Loss | Save | Attendance | Record |
|---|---|---|---|---|---|---|---|---|
| 22 | May 1 | @ Dodgers | 2–1 | Lowe (2–2) | Chacón (1–1) | Brazobán (8) | 46,243 | 6–16 |
| 23 | May 2 | @ Padres | 5–4 | Eaton (3–1) | Francis (1–1) | Hoffman (5) | 20,966 | 6–17 |
| 24 | May 3 | @ Padres | 2–1 | Otsuka (1–2) | Witasick (0–1) | Hoffman (6) | 22,547 | 6–18 |
| 25 | May 4 | @ Padres | 8–7 (12) | Reyes (1–0) | Carvajal (0–1) | | 25,444 | 6–19 |
| 26 | May 6 | @ Marlins | 7–0 | Willis (6–0) | Kennedy (1–4) | | 21,566 | 6–20 |
| 27 | May 7 | @ Marlins | 4–1 | Beckett (5–2) | Chacón (1–2) | Jones (2) | 26,218 | 6–21 |
| 28 | May 8 | @ Marlins | 8–3 | Francis (2–1) | Leiter (1–3) | | 17,538 | 7–21 |
| 29 | May 9 | Braves | 7–6 | Wright (2–2) | Hudson (3–2) | Tsao (3) | 20,307 | 8–21 |
| 30 | May 10 | Braves | 9–5 | Sosa (2–0) | Jennings (1–4) | | 20,415 | 8–22 |
| 31 | May 11 | Braves | 6–5 | Tsao (1–0) | Kolb (1–3) | | 19,631 | 9–22 |
| 32 | May 12 | Diamondbacks | 6–3 | Ortiz (3–2) | Chacón (1–3) | | 18,184 | 9–23 |
| 33 | May 13 | Diamondbacks | 18–3 | Francis (3–1) | Halsey (2–2) | | 20,233 | 10–23 |
| 34 | May 14 | Diamondbacks | 10–4 | Webb (5–0) | Wright (2–3) | | 23,367 | 10–24 |
| 35 | May 15 | Diamondbacks | 5–4 | Estes (4–3) | Jennings (1–5) | Bruney (2) | 28,071 | 10–25 |
| 36 | May 17 | Giants | 9–4 | Kennedy (2–4) | Lowry (1–5) | | 20,026 | 11–25 |
| 37 | May 18 | Giants | 3–2 | Brower (2–1) | Fuentes (0–3) | Walker (4) | 18,620 | 11–26 |
| 38 | May 19 | Giants | 3–1 | Francis (4–1) | Tomko (3–6) | Fuentes (1) | 21,877 | 12–26 |
| 39 | May 20 | @ Pirates | 9–4 | Redman (3–3) | Wright (2–4) | | 31,656 | 12–27 |
| 40 | May 21 | @ Pirates | 8–3 | Pérez (2–4) | Jennings (1–6) | González (1) | 37,504 | 12–28 |
| 41 | May 22 | @ Pirates | 4–3 | Kennedy (3–4) | Fogg (3–3) | Fuentes (2) | 20,853 | 13–28 |
| 42 | May 23 | @ Brewers | 2–1 | Capuano (4–3) | Chacón (1–4) | Bottalico (2) | 11,855 | 13–29 |
| 43 | May 24 | @ Brewers | 6–1 | Santos (2–4) | Francis (4–2) | | 17,759 | 13–30 |
| 44 | May 25 | @ Brewers | 11–1 | Glover (3–3) | Wright (2–5) | | 24,916 | 13–31 |
| 45 | May 26 | @ Cubs | 5–2 | Jennings (2–6) | Zambrano (3–3) | | 38,393 | 14–31 |
| 46 | May 27 | @ Cubs | 10–3 | Wellemeyer (1–0) | Kennedy (3–5) | | 38,771 | 14–32 |
| 47 | May 28 | @ Cubs | 5–1 | Rusch (4–1) | B. Kim (0–4) | | 39,368 | 14–33 |
| 48 | May 29 | @ Cubs | 11–6 | Novoa (1–1) | Carvajal (0–2) | | 40,322 | 14–34 |
| 49 | May 30 | Cardinals | 5–4 | Marquis (6–3) | Witasick (0–2) | Isringhausen (15) | 34,239 | 14–35 |
| 50 | May 31 | Cardinals | 2–1 | Jennings (3–6) | Mulder (7–2) | Fuentes (3) | 23,519 | 15–35 |

June (12–15)

| # | Date | Opponent | Score | Win | Loss | Save | Attendance | Record |
|---|---|---|---|---|---|---|---|---|
| 51 | June 1 | Cardinals | 8–6 | Morris (6–0) | Neal (0–2) | Isringhausen (16) | 22,266 | 15–36 |
| 52 | June 2 | Cardinals | 8–7 | Fuentes (1–3) | Isringhausen (0–1) | | 21,381 | 16–36 |
| 53 | June 3 | Reds | 12–4 | Francis (5–2) | Milton (3–7) | | 20,035 | 17–36 |
| 54 | June 4 | Reds | 7–5 | Wright (3–5) | Harang (4–3) | Fuentes (4) | 20,561 | 18–36 |
| 55 | June 5 | Reds | 8–6 | Neal (1–2) | Wagner (2–2) | Fuentes (5) | 24,426 | 19–36 |
| 56 | June 6 | White Sox | 9–3 | García (6–3) | Kennedy (3–6) | | 25,030 | 19–37 |
| 57 | June 7 | White Sox | 2–1 | Contreras (3–2) | B. Kim (0–5) | Hermanson (14) | 21,576 | 19–38 |
| 58 | June 8 | White Sox | 15–5 | Hernández (7–1) | Francis (5–3) | | 23,268 | 19–39 |
| 59 | June 10 | Tigers | 2–0 | Wright (4–5) | Maroth (4–7) | Fuentes (6) | 20,275 | 20–39 |
| 60 | June 11 | Tigers | 6–4 | Bonderman (7–4) | Jennings (3–7) | Percival (4) | 30,192 | 20–40 |
| 61 | June 12 | Tigers | 7–3 | B. Kim (1–5) | Robertson (2–4) | | 22,078 | 21–40 |
| 62 | June 14 | @ Indians | 11–2 | Westbrook (3–9) | Francis (5–4) | | 17,631 | 21–41 |
| 63 | June 15 | @ Indians | 7–6 (11) | Howry (4–1) | Neal (1–3) | | 20,986 | 21–42 |
| 64 | June 16 | @ Indians | 2–1 | Millwood (2–4) | Wright (4–6) | Wickman (18) | 19,244 | 21–43 |
| 65 | June 17 | @ Orioles | 2–1 | Jennings (4–7) | Cabrera (5–6) | Fuentes (7) | 49,004 | 22–43 |
| 66 | June 18 | @ Orioles | 7–2 | Ponson (7–4) | B. Kim (1–6) | | 43,067 | 22–44 |
| 67 | June 19 | @ Orioles | 4–2 | Penn (2–0) | Francis (5–5) | Ryan (18) | 45,945 | 22–45 |
| 68 | June 20 | @ Astros | 7–0 | Pettitte (4–7) | Kennedy (3–7) | | 28,237 | 22–46 |
| 69 | June 21 | @ Astros | 6–5 | Qualls (2–3) | Wright (4–7) | Lidge (17) | 28,788 | 22–47 |
| 70 | June 22 | @ Astros | 6–2 | Clemens (6–3) | Jennings (4–8) | | 39,415 | 22–48 |
| 71 | June 24 | Royals | 12–4 | B. Kim (2–6) | Carrasco (2–3) | | 24,584 | 23–48 |
| 72 | June 25 | Royals | 4–2 | Francis (6–5) | Hernández (5–8) | Fuentes (8) | 27,673 | 24–48 |
| 73 | June 26 | Royals | 9–4 | Kennedy (4–7) | Lima (1–6) | | 21,080 | 25–48 |
| 74 | June 27 | Astros | 11–5 | Rodríguez (3–3) | Wright (4–8) | | 21,877 | 25–49 |
| 75 | June 28 | Astros | 6–5 | Cortés (1–0) | Springer (1–3) | Fuentes (9) | 28,726 | 26–49 |
| 76 | June 29 | Astros | 7–1 | Oswalt (10–7) | B. Kim (2–7) | | 23,494 | 26–50 |
| 77 | June 30 | @ Cardinals | 7–0 | Francis (7–5) | Suppan (7–7) | | 44,036 | 27–50 |

July (10–17)

| # | Date | Opponent | Score | Win | Loss | Save | Attendance | Record |
|---|---|---|---|---|---|---|---|---|
| 78 | July 1 | @ Cardinals | 6–0 | Carpenter (12–4) | Kennedy (4–8) | | 40,128 | 27–51 |
| 79 | July 2 | @ Cardinals | 3–1 | Wright (5–8) | Marquis (8–6) | Fuentes (10) | 47,913 | 28–51 |
| 80 | July 3 | @ Cardinals | 5–4 | King (2–1) | Witasick (0–3) | | 47,811 | 28–52 |
| 81 | July 4 | Dodgers | 4–3 (11) | Carrara (6–2) | Witasick (0–4) | Brazobán (16) | 48,538 | 28–53 |
| 82 | July 5 | Dodgers | 6–1 | Francis (8–5) | Peréz (4–5) | | 20,063 | 29–53 |
| 83 | July 6 | Dodgers | 9–5 | Penny (5–5) | Chacón (1–5) | | 21,603 | 29–54 |
| 84 | July 7 | Dodgers | 8–5 | DeJean (4–1) | Carrara (6–3) | Fuentes (11) | 21,739 | 30–54 |
| 85 | July 8 | Padres | 12–2 | Stauffer (3–4) | Wright (5–9) | | 23,301 | 30–55 |
| 86 | July 9 | Padres | 1–0 | Jennings (5–8) | Lawrence (5–8) | Fuentes (12) | 30,228 | 31–55 |
| 87 | July 10 | Padres | 8–5 | Quantrill (2–0) | Francis (8–6) | Hoffman (25) | 23,386 | 31–56 |
| 88 | July 15 | @ Reds | 4–3 | Harang (5–8) | Jennings (5–9) | Weathers (4) | 21,116 | 31–57 |
| 89 | July 16 | @ Reds | 7–6 | Standridge (1–0) | Miceli (0–1) | Weathers (5) | 28,951 | 31–58 |
| 90 | July 17 | @ Reds | 9–4 | Ortiz (5–6) | Wright (5–10) | | 20,736 | 31–59 |
| 91 | July 18 | @ Nationals | 5–4 | Acevedo (1–0) | Cordero (2–2) | Fuentes (13) | 30,165 | 32–59 |
| 92 | July 19 | @ Nationals | 4–0 | Patterson (4–2) | Chacón (1–6) | Cordero (33) | 30,655 | 32–60 |
| 93 | July 20 | @ Nationals | 3–2 | Jennings (6–9) | Hernández (12–4) | Fuentes (14) | 32,381 | 33–60 |
| 94 | July 21 | @ Pirates | 8–1 | Duke (3–0) | Francis (8–7) | | 22,492 | 33–61 |
| 95 | July 22 | @ Pirates | 5–3 (10) | Fuentes (2–3) | Mesa (1–6) | Cortés (1) | 35,262 | 34–61 |
| 96 | July 23 | @ Pirates | 5–3 | Williams (8–7) | B. Kim (2–8) | Mesa (23) | 37,778 | 34–62 |
| 97 | July 24 | @ Pirates | 3–0 | Redman (5–10) | Chacón (1–7) | Mesa (24) | 18,523 | 34–63 |
| 98 | July 25 | Mets | 5–3 | Acevedo (2–0) | Glavine (7–8) | Fuentes (15) | 22,216 | 35–63 |
| 99 | July 26 | Mets | 4–3 | Francis (9–7) | Ishii (3–9) | Fuentes (16) | 22,518 | 36–63 |
| 100 | July 27 | Mets | 9–3 | Zambrano (5–9) | Wright (5–11) | | 26,183 | 36–64 |
| 101 | July 28 | Phillies | 8–5 | Urbina (2–3) | DeJean (4–2) | Wagner (22) | 22,015 | 36–65 |
| 102 | July 29 | Phillies | 5–3 | Myers (9–5) | Acevedo (2–1) | Wagner (23) | 21,855 | 36–66 |
| 103 | July 30 | Phillies | 8–7 | Lidle (9–9) | Cook (0–1) | Wagner (24) | 33,418 | 36–67 |
| 104 | July 31 | Phillies | 9–2 | Francis (10–7) | Lieber (9–10) | | 21,807 | 37–67 |

August (15–14)

| # | Date | Opponent | Score | Win | Loss | Save | Attendance | Record |
|---|---|---|---|---|---|---|---|---|
| 105 | August 2 | @ Giants | 4–3 | Wright (6–11) | Tomko (7–11) | Fuentes (17) | 39,349 | 38–67 |
| 106 | August 3 | @ Giants | 3–2 | Miceli (1–1) | Walker (3–4) | Fuentes (18) | 36,239 | 39–67 |
| 107 | August 4 | @ Giants | 6–4 | Munter (2–0) | Miceli (1–2) | Walker (19) | 40,721 | 39–68 |
| 108 | August 5 | @ Diamondbacks | 6–4 | DeJean (5–2) | Cormier (7–2) | Fuentes (19) | 22,596 | 40–68 |
| 109 | August 6 | @ Diamondbacks | 14–7 | Francis (11–7) | Gosling (0–3) | | 31,186 | 41–68 |
| 110 | August 7 | @ Diamondbacks | 9–4 | Vargas (5–6) | Wright (6–12) | | 28,028 | 41–69 |
| 111 | August 8 | Marlins | 4–3 (11) | Dohmann (1–1) | De Los Santos (1–1) | | | 42–69 |
| 112 | August 8 | Marlins | 5–3 | B. Kim (3–8) | Valdez (1–1) | Fuentes (20) | 19,784 | 43–69 |
| 113 | August 9 | Pirates | 12–4 | Williams (9–8) | Acevedo (2–2) | | 20,683 | 43–70 |
| 114 | August 10 | Pirates | 6–5 (10) | Cortés (2–0) | White (3–4) | | 20,135 | 44–70 |
| 115 | August 11 | Pirates | 11–3 | Fogg (6–7) | Francis (11–8) | | 21,102 | 44–71 |
| 116 | August 12 | Nationals | 4–2 | Loaiza (7–8) | Wright (6–13) | Cordero (38) | 28,598 | 44–72 |
| 117 | August 13 | Nationals | 8–0 | Armas (7–5) | B. Kim (3–9) | | 31,447 | 44–73 |
| 118 | August 14 | Nationals | 9–2 | Patterson (7–3) | Acevedo (2–3) | | 24,552 | 44–74 |
| 119 | August 15 | Brewers | 11–2 | Cook (1–1) | Sheets (8–9) | | 18,596 | 45–74 |
| 120 | August 16 | Brewers | 6–4 | Santos (4–11) | Francis (11–9) | Turnbow (25) | 18,582 | 45–75 |
| 121 | August 17 | Brewers | 2–0 | Capuano (13–8) | Wright (6–14) | Turnbow (26) | 19,288 | 45–76 |
| 122 | August 19 | Cubs | 5–3 | Prior (9–4) | B. Kim (3–10) | Dempster (19) | 30,175 | 45–77 |
| 123 | August 20 | Cubs | 4–2 | Cook (2–1) | Rusch (5–6) | Fuentes (21) | 35,787 | 46–77 |
| 124 | August 21 | Cubs | 9–7 | S. Kim (2–2) | Maddux (10–10) | | 30,111 | 47–77 |
| 125 | August 23 | @ Dodgers | 8–3 | Weaver (12–8) | Wright (6–15) | | 44,416 | 47–78 |
| 126 | August 24 | @ Dodgers | 2–1 | Williams (2–0) | Schmoll (2–2) | Fuentes (22) | 40,196 | 48–78 |
| 127 | August 25 | @ Dodgers | 5–4 | Cook (3–1) | Penny (6–8) | Fuentes (23) | 40,019 | 49–78 |
| 128 | August 26 | @ Padres | 4–3 | Francis (12–9) | Eaton (9–3) | Fuentes (24) | 33,621 | 50–78 |
| 129 | August 27 | @ Padres | 4–2 | S. Kim (3–2) | Lawrence (7–13) | Cortés (2) | 32,585 | 51–78 |
| 130 | August 28 | @ Padres | 4–3 | Astacio (4–10) | Wright (6–16) | Hoffman (33) | 28,899 | 51–79 |
| 131 | August 29 | @ Giants | 2–1 | B. Kim (4–10) | Cain (0–1) | Fuentes (25) | 36,433 | 52–79 |
| 132 | August 30 | @ Giants | 4–3 | Taschner (1–0) | DeJean (5–3) | Benítez (8) | 36,439 | 52–80 |
| 133 | August 31 | @ Giants | 5–3 | Fassero (4–6) | Francis (12–10) | Benítez (9) | 36,508 | 52–81 |

September (14–13)

| # | Date | Opponent | Score | Win | Loss | Save | Attendance | Record |
|---|---|---|---|---|---|---|---|---|
| 134 | September 2 | Dodgers | 11–3 | S. Kim (4–2) | Weaver (13–9) | Acevedo (1) | 19,272 | 53–81 |
| 135 | September 3 | Dodgers | 11–1 | B. Kim (5–10) | Houlton (5–8) | | 23,398 | 54–81 |
| 136 | September 4 | Dodgers | 7–6 (10) | Dohmann (2–1) | Sánchez (4–5) | | 25,069 | 55–81 |
| 137 | September 6 | @ Padres | 6–5 | Cook (4–1) | Park (12–7) | Fuentes (26) | 26,483 | 56–81 |
| 138 | September 7 | @ Padres | 4–2 | Eaton (10–3) | Francis (12–11) | Hoffman (36) | 23,893 | 56–82 |
| 139 | September 8 | @ Padres | 3–2 (10) | Linebrink (6–1) | Acevedo (2–4) | | 34,366 | 56–83 |
| 140 | September 9 | Diamondbacks | 7–1 | Estes (7–7) | B. Kim (5–11) | | 20,045 | 56–84 |
| 141 | September 10 | Diamondbacks | 8–5 | Vargas (9–8) | Day (1–3) | Valverde (7) | 20,284 | 56–85 |
| 142 | September 11 | Diamondbacks | 7–2 | Cook (5–1) | Ortiz (5–10) | | 20,476 | 57–85 |
| 143 | September 12 | @ Dodgers | 7–0 | Weaver (14–9) | Francis (12–12) | | 33,255 | 57–86 |
| 144 | September 13 | @ Dodgers | 6–4 | S. Kim (5–2) | Jackson (1–2) | Fuentes (27) | 30,535 | 58–86 |
| 145 | September 14 | @ Dodgers | 8–7 | Wright (7–16) | Brazobán (4–9) | Fuentes (28) | 30,329 | 59–86 |
| 146 | September 16 | @ Diamondbacks | 6–5 | Williams (3–0) | Medders (2–1) | Fuentes (29) | 20,207 | 60–86 |
| 147 | September 17 | @ Diamondbacks | 6–5 | Villareal (1–0) | Williams (3–1) | Valverde (8) | 24,701 | 60–87 |
| 148 | September 18 | @ Diamondbacks | 7–1 | Francis (13–12) | Ortiz (5–11) | | 24,351 | 61–87 |
| 149 | September 19 | Padres | 8–7 | Linebrink (8–1) | Fuentes (2–4) | Hoffman (39) | 18,238 | 61–88 |
| 150 | September 20 | Padres | 20–1 | Wright (8–16) | Williams (8–12) | | 18,336 | 62–88 |
| 151 | September 21 | Padres | 5–2 | Peavy (13–7) | Esposito (0–1) | Hoffman (40) | 18,437 | 62–89 |
| 152 | September 22 | Padres | 4–2 | Cook (6–1) | Eaton (10–5) | Fuentes (30) | 18,119 | 63–89 |
| 153 | September 23 | Giants | 7–6 | Accardo (1–4) | DeJean (5–4) | Walker (23) | 35,265 | 63–90 |
| 154 | September 24 | Giants | 6–0 | S. Kim (6–2) | Lowry (13–13) | | 25,141 | 64–90 |
| 155 | September 25 | Giants | 6–2 | Walker (5–4) | Fuentes (2–5) | | 31,746 | 64–91 |
| 156 | September 26 | @ Braves | 6–5 | Speier (2–1) | Reitsma (3–6) | Fuentes (31) | 23,788 | 65–91 |
| 157 | September 27 | @ Braves | 12–3 | Hudson (14–9) | Cook (6–2) | | 25,306 | 65–92 |
| 158 | September 28 | @ Braves | 10–5 | Francis (14–12) | Davies (7–5) | | 29,971 | 66–92 |
| 159 | September 29 | @ Mets | 11–0 | Glavine (13–13) | S. Kim (6–3) | | 27,570 | 66–93 |
| 160 | September 30 | @ Mets | 3–2 | Benson (10–8) | B. Kim (5–12) | Heilman (5) | 29,133 | 66–94 |

October (1–1)

| # | Date | Opponent | Score | Win | Loss | Save | Attendance | Record |
|---|---|---|---|---|---|---|---|---|
| 161 | October 1 | @ Mets | 3–1 | Seo (8–2) | Esposito (0–2) | Hernández (4) | 36,385 | 66–95 |
| 162 | October 2 | @ Mets | 11–3 | Cook (7–2) | Zambrano (7–12) | | 47,718 | 67–95 |

== Player stats ==
| = Indicates team leader |

=== Batting ===
==== Starters by position ====
Note: Pos = Position; G = Games played; AB = At bats; H = Hits; Avg. = Batting average; HR = Home runs; RBI = Runs batted in

| Pos | Player | G | AB | H | Avg. | HR | RBI |
|---|---|---|---|---|---|---|---|
| C | Danny Ardoin | 80 | 210 | 48 | .229 | 6 | 22 |
| 1B | Todd Helton | 144 | 509 | 163 | .320 | 20 | 79 |
| 2B | Aaron Miles | 99 | 324 | 91 | .281 | 2 | 28 |
| SS | Clint Barmes | 81 | 350 | 101 | .289 | 10 | 46 |
| 3B | Garrett Atkins | 138 | 519 | 149 | .287 | 13 | 89 |
| LF | Matt Holliday | 125 | 479 | 147 | .307 | 19 | 87 |
| CF | Cory Sullivan | 139 | 378 | 111 | .294 | 4 | 30 |
| RF | Brad Hawpe | 101 | 305 | 80 | .262 | 9 | 47 |

==== Other batters ====
Note: G = Games played; AB = At bats; H = Hits; Avg. = Batting average; HR = Home runs; RBI = Runs batted in

| Player | G | AB | H | Avg. | HR | RBI |
|---|---|---|---|---|---|---|
| Luis González | 128 | 404 | 118 | .292 | 9 | 44 |
| Preston Wilson | 71 | 267 | 69 | .258 | 15 | 47 |
| Dustan Mohr | 98 | 266 | 57 | .214 | 17 | 38 |
| J.D. Closser | 92 | 237 | 52 | .219 | 7 | 27 |
| Desi Relaford | 73 | 210 | 47 | .224 | 1 | 16 |
| Omar Quintanilla | 39 | 128 | 28 | .219 | 0 | 7 |
| Todd Greene | 38 | 126 | 32 | .254 | 7 | 23 |
| Jorge Piedra | 61 | 112 | 35 | .313 | 6 | 16 |
| Ryan Shealy | 36 | 91 | 30 | .330 | 2 | 16 |
| Eddy Garabito | 42 | 88 | 27 | .307 | 1 | 8 |
| Larry Bigbie | 23 | 66 | 14 | .212 | 0 | 2 |
| Eric Byrnes | 15 | 53 | 10 | .189 | 0 | 5 |
| Jeff Baker | 12 | 38 | 8 | .211 | 1 | 4 |
| Michael Restovich | 14 | 31 | 9 | .290 | 1 | 3 |
| Choo Freeman | 18 | 22 | 6 | .273 | 0 | 0 |
| Anderson Machado | 4 | 10 | 0 | .000 | 0 | 2 |
| Ryan Spilborghs | 1 | 4 | 2 | .500 | 0 | 1 |
| Alfredo Amézaga | 2 | 3 | 1 | .333 | 0 | 0 |
| Tim Olson | 3 | 2 | 0 | .000 | 0 | 0 |

=== Pitching ===
==== Starting pitchers ====
Note: G = Games pitched; IP = Innings pitched; W = Wins; L = Losses; ERA = Earned run average; SO = Strikeouts

| Player | G | IP | W | L | ERA | SO |
|---|---|---|---|---|---|---|
| Jeff Francis | 33 | 183.2 | 14 | 12 | 5.68 | 128 |
| Jamey Wright | 34 | 171.1 | 8 | 16 | 5.46 | 101 |
| Jason Jennings | 20 | 122.0 | 6 | 9 | 5.02 | 75 |
| Joe Kennedy | 16 | 92.0 | 4 | 8 | 7.04 | 52 |
| Aaron Cook | 13 | 83.1 | 7 | 2 | 3.67 | 24 |
| Shawn Chacón | 13 | 72.2 | 1 | 7 | 4.09 | 39 |
| Mike Esposito | 3 | 14.2 | 0 | 2 | 6.75 | 5 |

==== Other pitchers ====
Note: G = Games pitched; IP = Innings pitched; W = Wins; L = Losses; ERA = Earned run average; SO = Strikeouts

| Player | G | IP | W | L | ERA | SO |
|---|---|---|---|---|---|---|
| Byung-hyun Kim | 40 | 148.0 | 5 | 12 | 4.86 | 115 |
| Sun-Woo Kim | 12 | 53.1 | 5 | 1 | 4.22 | 38 |
| Zach Day | 5 | 11.1 | 0 | 1 | 6.75 | 5 |

==== Relief pitchers ====
Note: G = Games pitched; W = Wins; L = Losses; SV = Saves; ERA = Earned run average; SO = Strikeouts

| Player | G | W | L | SV | ERA | SO |
|---|---|---|---|---|---|---|
| Brian Fuentes | 78 | 2 | 5 | 31 | 2.91 | 91 |
| David Cortés | 50 | 2 | 0 | 2 | 4.10 | 36 |
| Marcos Carvajal | 39 | 0 | 2 | 0 | 5.09 | 47 |
| Mike DeJean | 38 | 2 | 3 | 0 | 3.19 | 35 |
| José Acevedo | 36 | 2 | 4 | 1 | 6.47 | 31 |
| Jay Witasick | 32 | 0 | 4 | 0 | 2.52 | 40 |
| Scott Dohmann | 32 | 2 | 1 | 0 | 6.10 | 35 |
| Randy Williams | 30 | 2 | 1 | 0 | 5.73 | 19 |
| Ryan Speier | 22 | 2 | 1 | 0 | 3.65 | 10 |
| Dan Miceli | 19 | 1 | 2 | 0 | 5.89 | 19 |
| Bobby Seay | 17 | 0 | 0 | 0 | 8.49 | 11 |
| Matt Anderson | 12 | 0 | 0 | 0 | 12.60 | 4 |
| Blaine Neal | 11 | 1 | 2 | 0 | 6.14 | 8 |
| Chin-hui Tsao | 10 | 1 | 0 | 3 | 6.55 | 4 |
| Javier Lopez | 3 | 0 | 0 | 0 | 22.50 | 1 |
| Allan Simpson | 2 | 0 | 0 | 0 | 67.50 | 0 |
| Aquilino López | 1 | 0 | 0 | 0 | 2.25 | 6 |

== Farm system ==
| Level | Team | League | Manager |
|---|---|---|---|
| AAA | Colorado Springs Sky Sox | Pacific Coast League | Marv Foley |
| AA | Tulsa Drillers | Texas League | Tom Runnells |
| A | Modesto Nuts | California League | Stu Cole |
| A | Asheville Tourists | South Atlantic League | Joe Mikulik |
| A-Short Season | Tri-City Dust Devils | Northwest League | Ron Gideon |
| Rookie | Casper Rockies | Pioneer League | P. J. Carey |

Records
| Preceded by 2004 | Colorado Rockies seasons 2005 | Succeeded by 2006 |
