= Denny Bautista =

Dominican baseball player (born 1980)

- Pitcher
- Born: August 23, 1980 (age 45); Sánchez, Dominican Republic
- Batted: Right Threw: Right

Professional debut
- MLB: May 25, 2004, for the Baltimore Orioles
- KBO: July 6, 2011, for the Hanwha Eagles

Last appearance
- MLB: August 14, 2010, for the San Francisco Giants
- KBO: October 5, 2013, for the Hanwha Eagles

MLB statistics
- Win–loss record: 11–15
- Earned run average: 5.88
- Strikeouts: 180

KBO statistics
- Win–loss record: 14–13
- Earned run average: 3.70
- Strikeouts: 321
- Stats at Baseball Reference

Teams
- Baltimore Orioles (2004); Kansas City Royals (2004–2006); Colorado Rockies (2006–2007); Detroit Tigers (2008); Pittsburgh Pirates (2008–2009); San Francisco Giants (2010); Hanwha Eagles (2011–2013)

Denny M. Bautista Germán (born August 23, 1980) is a Dominican former professional baseball pitcher. Bautista is 6 feet 5 inches (1.96 m) tall and weighs 190 pounds (86 kg). He played in Major League Baseball (MLB) for the Baltimore Orioles, Kansas City Royals, Colorado Rockies, Detroit Tigers, Pittsburgh Pirates, and San Francisco Giants from 2004 to 2010. From 2011 through 2013, he played for the Hanwha Eagles of the KBO League. He bats and throws right-handed. Bautista throws three pitches: a fastball, a curveball, and a changeup. He has struggled with control throughout his career.

Bautista grew up receiving instruction on pitching from his second cousin, Pedro Martínez. The Florida Marlins signed him in 2000 but traded him to the Baltimore Orioles before Bautista reached the major leagues. He debuted with the Orioles in 2004, appearing in two games before getting traded to the Kansas City Royals. Bautista was ranked Kansas City's number two prospect by Baseball America entering the 2005 season, but he made just seven starts before missing the rest of the season with an injury. He posted a 5.66 earned run average (ERA) for the Royals in 2006 before getting traded to the Colorado Rockies. He appeared in nine games (all in relief) for the Rockies in 2007, spending most of the year in the minor leagues.

After 2007, Bautista never made another start in the major leagues. He began 2008 with the Detroit Tigers bullpen but had an injury and was traded to the Pittsburgh Pirates during the year. He re-signed with Pittsburgh in 2009 but only appeared in 14 games, spending most of the year in the minors. Bautista posted a 3.74 ERA with the San Francisco Giants in 2010 but was never on their playoff roster and was released during the playoffs. In 2011, he signed with the Seattle Mariners but was assigned to the minor leagues. Halfway through the season, he joined the Hanwha Eagles of the Korea Baseball Organization. On April 18, 2015, it was announced that he had signed a minor league deal with the Boston Red Sox.

== Early life ==
Bautista was born on August 23, 1980, in Santo Domingo, Dominican Republic. He had an early connection to Major League Baseball (MLB): as a teenager he pitched in a park built by professional baseball players Pedro Martínez, Ramón Martínez, and Juan Guzmán. Pedro, then one of baseball's outstanding starting pitchers, mentored Bautista and trained with him during the offseason.

== Professional career ==
=== Minor league career ===
==== Florida Marlins organization ====
The Florida Marlins signed Bautista on June 21, 2000, and assigned him to the Gulf Coast Marlins, their rookie-level minor league affiliate. He started 11 games for the Marlins, posting a 6–2 win–loss record with an earned run average (ERA) of 2.43 and 17 walks. He was tied for second in the league in wins (along with six other pitchers behind Jeff Randazzo's seven), second in the league in ERA (behind Yoel Hernández's 1.35), tied for second with 58 strikeouts (along with Randazzo behind Manuel Esquivia's 77), third in the league with 63 innings pitched (behind Randazzo's 68 2/3 and Esquivia's 64 2/3), and tied for second in the league in complete games with two (tied with Hernández behind Randazzo's three). He also appeared in one game for the Single-A short season Utica Blue Sox of the New York–Penn League that year. He split 2001 between Utica and the Single-A Kane County Cougars of the Midwest League, going a combined 6–2 with an ERA of 3.23, 51 strikeouts, 20 walks, and 78 1/3 innings pitched in 15 games (14 starts). In the playoffs, he pitched a shutout for the Cougars, allowing just one hit, striking out eight, and helping the Cougars win their first Midwest League title.

After the 2001 season, Baseball America ranked Bautista the third-best prospect in the Marlins' organization. The following April, a USA Today article said that Bautista had similar career potential to Pedro Martínez, noting that Bautista's fastball had become about 10 mph faster during his time in the minor leagues. In 2002, he pitched with the Single-A Advanced Jupiter Hammerheads of the Florida State League, where he went 4–6 with an ERA of 4.99, 79 strikeouts, 40 walks, and 88 1/3 innings pitched in 19 games (15 starts). He recovered in 2003, making 25 starts between the Hammerheads and the Double-A Carolina Mudcats of the Southern League. He finished the year with a 12–9 win–loss record, an improved ERA of 3.41, 138 strikeouts, and 70 walks in 137 1/3 innings pitched.

=== Major League career ===
==== Baltimore Orioles ====
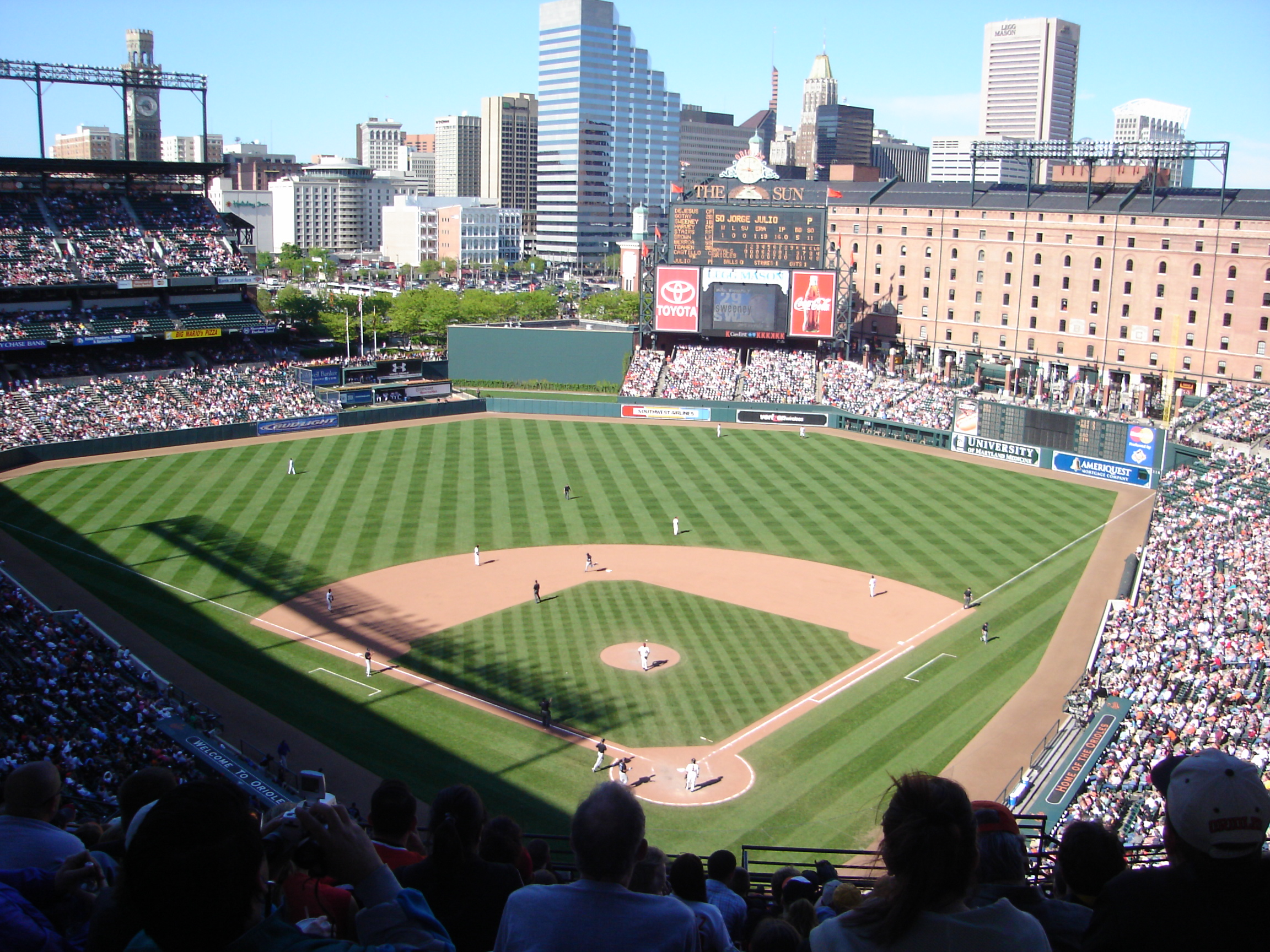
Bautista made his major league debut at Oriole Park at Camden Yards

On August 31, 2003, the Marlins traded Bautista and fellow minor leaguer Don Levinski to the Baltimore Orioles for veteran Jeff Conine. Before the 2004 season, Baseball America ranked him the Orioles' fifth-best prospect. The Orioles assigned Bautista to the Double-A Bowie Baysox of the Eastern League, where he went 3–5 with a 4.74 ERA, 72 strikeouts, 33 walks, and 62 2/3 innings pitched in 14 games (13 starts) during the 2004 season. Bautista made his major league debut that year: the Orioles called him up as part of a roster reshuffle, and he made his first appearance, in relief, on May 25, 2004, against the New York Yankees. He recorded three outs in the first inning he pitched, but he got into difficulties and surrendered four runs on three hits before getting removed during his second inning. After a second relief appearance on May 27 (in which he allowed four runs in 1/3 of an inning) amid a three-game sweep of the Orioles by the Yankees, Bautista was sent back to Bowie. A month later the Orioles traded him to the Kansas City Royals for veteran relief pitcher Jason Grimsley.

==== Kansas City Royals ====
===== 2004 =====
The Royals assigned Bautista to the Double-A Wichita Wranglers of the Texas League, where he went 4–3 with an ERA of 2.53, 73 strikeouts, 32 walks, and 81 2/3 innings pitched in 12 starts. In September, he was called up and added to the Royals' starting rotation when the team decided to go to a six-man staff to limit their pitchers' innings. He made his first major league start on September 6, allowing four runs over six innings and taking the loss in a 7–3 defeat to the Detroit Tigers. In five starts for the Royals, Bautista had an 0–4 record, a 6.51 ERA, 18 strikeouts, and 11 walks in 27 2/3 innings pitched.

===== 2005 =====
Bautista was ranked the second-best prospect in the Royals' organization before the 2005 season by Baseball America. After a productive spring training in 2005, Bautista was named to the Royals' starting rotation again; he started seven games, going 2–2 with an ERA of 5.80, 23 strikeouts, and 17 walks in 35 2/3 innings pitched before tendinitis in his shoulder put him on the disabled list for the remainder of the season. On April 8, 2005, Bautista won his first MLB game, holding the Los Angeles Angels of Anaheim to one run in eight innings pitched.

===== 2006 =====
At the start of the 2006 season, Bautista was again in the Royals' starting rotation, but after a poor start (interrupted by a disabled list stint from April 14 to May 8) in which he went 0–2 with an ERA of 5.66, 22 strikeouts, and 17 walks in 35 innings pitched, the Royals sent him to the Triple-A Omaha Royals of the Pacific Coast League. There he continued to struggle, posting a 2–5 record, a 7.36 ERA, 28 strikeouts, 32 walks, and 44 innings pitched in 10 starts. On August 1, the Royals traded him along with Jeremy Affeldt to the Colorado Rockies for Ryan Shealy and Scott Dohmann.

==== Colorado Rockies ====
===== 2006 =====
The Rockies assigned Bautista to the Triple-A Colorado Springs Sky Sox of the Pacific Coast League where he started six games, posting a 1–4 record, a 4.50 ERA, 35 strikeouts, and 16 walks in 36 innings pitched before being called up to the Rockies in September. He appeared in four games, three of them in relief with Colorado. In 12 games (eight starts) with Kansas City and Colorado on the season, Bautista had an 0–3 record, a 5.62 ERA, 27 strikeouts, and 21 walks in 41 2/3 innings. His Pacific Coast League totals for 2006 were a 3–9 record, a 6.08 ERA, 63 strikeouts, and 40 walks in 80 innings pitched.

===== 2007 =====
Bautista was optioned to Colorado Springs halfway through spring training in 2007. On April 29, he was called up by the Rockies to replace Ryan Speier in the bullpen. He gave up one run over 4 2/3 innings and won two of the first four games he appeared in before he then allowed 11 runs in one inning pitched over his next three outings. After Bautista allowed six runs in 1/3 of an inning on May 13 in a 15–2 loss to the San Francisco Giants, bringing his ERA to 19.06, he was sent back to Colorado Springs. In 51 games, all in relief, at Colorado Springs, he had a 3–2 record, a 2.92 ERA, 63 strikeouts, and 31 walks in 64 2/3 innings. He was recalled when rosters expanded in September. On September 12, he made his final major league start in a bullpen game, throwing two scoreless innings in a 12–0 victory over the Philadelphia Phillies. In nine games, he had a 2–1 record, a 12.46 ERA, eight strikeouts, and four walks in 8 2/3 innings pitched. He was left off the playoff roster as the Rockies went to the World Series. On December 4, the Rockies traded Bautista to the Detroit Tigers for pitcher José Capellán.

==== Detroit Tigers ====
Bautista began 2008 with the Tigers in a relief role, often pitching in the eighth-inning as the "setup man" for veteran closer Todd Jones. In his debut on Opening Day (March 31), he gave up a run in the 11th inning and took the loss in a 5–4 defeat to the Royals. After that game, he had nine consecutive scoreless outings. He then allowed five runs over three outings in a row before getting placed on the disabled list on May 3 with a sore shoulder. He came off the disabled list on June 5 and appeared in three more games with the Tigers. In 16 games with the Tigers, Bautista had an 0–1 record, a 3.32 ERA, 10 strikeouts, and 14 walks in 19 innings. Due to the return of Joel Zumaya from the disabled list, Bautista was designated for assignment and was traded to the Pittsburgh Pirates on June 25 for right-handed pitcher Kyle Pearson.

==== Pittsburgh Pirates ====
===== 2008 =====
Bautista made thirty-five appearances for the Pirates in 2008, all in relief. On July 2, he threw 3 1/3 scoreless innings of relief to pick up the win in a 9–5 victory over the Cincinnati Reds. With Pittsburgh, Bautista posted a 4–3 record, an ERA of 6.10, 34 strikeouts, and 28 walks in 41 1/3 innings. His combined totals for the season were a 4–4 record, a 5.22 ERA, 44 strikeouts, 42 walks, and 60 1/3 innings in 51 games. Bautista was eligible for arbitration but the Pirates declined to tender an offer, although general manager Neal Huntington stated "We'd like to get him back."

===== 2009 =====
On December 22, 2008, Bautista signed a minor league contract with an invitation to spring training to return to the Pirates in 2009. He failed to make the team and began 2009 with the Triple-A Indianapolis Indians of the International League. In 36 games with Indianapolis, he had a 2–3 record, a 4.88 ERA, 58 strikeouts, and 34 walks in 48 innings. On August 15, he had his contract purchased from Indianapolis to replace the injured José Ascanio in the bullpen. He threw two scoreless innings to earn the win on August 27 in a 3–2 victory over the Philadelphia Phillies. In 14 games, he had a 1–1 record, a 5.27 ERA, 15 strikeouts, and seven walks in 13 2/3 innings. On October 27, he became a free agent.

==== San Francisco Giants ====
On January 21, 2010, Bautista signed a minor league contract with the San Francisco Giants with an invite to spring training. He competed with Guillermo Mota for the final spot in the Giants' bullpen but was sent to the minors on April 4 as Mota won the job. Bautista served as the closer for the Fresno Grizzlies of the Pacific Coast League before he was recalled to the major league team on May 7. Giants' manager Bruce Bochy said, "He's been the best pitcher down there." With the Giants, Bautista often pitched in long relief. He posted a 2.16 ERA in his first 19 games through June 30, but in 12 games after that, his ERA was 8.31. In his most recent major league appearance, on August 4, he allowed back-to-back home runs to Carlos González and Troy Tulowitzki in a 6–1 loss to Colorado. On August 5, Bautista was designated for assignment by the Giants to make room for Todd Wellemeyer on the roster. Shortly thereafter, he was outrighted to Fresno. In 31 games with the Giants, he had a 2–0 record, a 3.74 ERA, 44 strikeouts, and 27 walks in 33 2/3 innings. In 19 games with Fresno, he had a 3–2 record, a 3.18 ERA, 28 strikeouts, 9 walks, and six saves in 22 2/3 innings pitched. He did not pitch at all in the postseason for the Giants as they won the 2010 World Series; in fact, he was granted free agency during the playoffs on October 12.

==== Seattle Mariners organization ====
On December 14, 2010, Bautista signed a minor league contract with the Seattle Mariners including an invite to spring training. He stayed with the Mariners through most of spring training but was reassigned to the minor leagues on March 27, 2011. In 24 games with the Tacoma Rainiers of the Pacific Coast League, Bautista had a 1–2 record, a 4.21 ERA, 49 strikeouts, and 22 walks in 36 1/3 innings. He was released on June 30 so that he could join the Korea Baseball Organization.

==== Hanwha Eagles ====
Bautista signed with the Hanwha Eagles in Korea on June 29, 2011. He served as Hanwha's closer upon joining the team in 2011, posting a 3–0 record, a 2.02 ERA, 122 strikeouts, 41 walks, and 35 2/3 innings pitched in 27 games. On April 11, 2013, he allowed a three-run home run to Lee Seung-Yeop in a 4–0 loss to the Samsung Lions. While pitching for Hanwha, he has become friends with Kim Tae-kyun. Used as a starter in 2013 after the departure of Hyun-jin Ryu, Bautista had a 7–7 record, a 4.24 ERA, and 153 strikeouts in 138 innings. After the 2013 season, the Eagles chose not to resign Bautista, opting to make Félix Pie and Caleb Clay the foreign players on their roster.

=== Boston Red Sox ===
Bautista signed a minor league deal with the Boston Red Sox in April 2015. He was released in June 2015.

== Pitching style ==
Bautista throws three pitches: a fastball, a curveball, and a changeup. His fastball travels in the high 90 mph range. His curve can break down sharply, and he learned the changeup from Pedro Martínez. Wildness had been a problem for Bautista throughout his career. He has trouble controlling his fastball and walks a great deal of hitters, which has often contributed to his departure from teams.

== Personal life ==
Bautista is married to Elizabeth; the couple has one son and resides in Santo Domingo. The relationship between Bautista and Pedro Martínez has been reported variously as first cousin and second cousin, with Bautista at one point denying there was a connection at all. Bautista finally confirmed that he and Martínez are second cousins through Bautista's mother.
