= Marcos Carvajal =

Venezuelan baseball player (1984-2018)

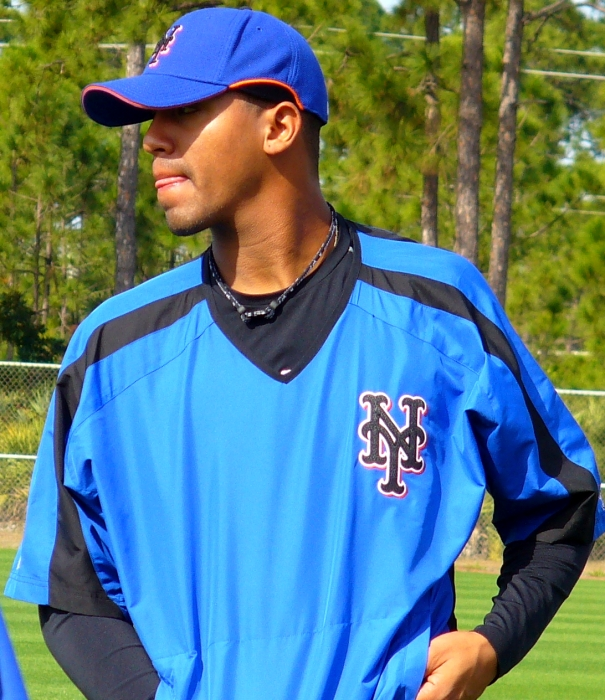
- Relief pitcher
- Born: August 19, 1984; Ciudad Bolívar, Bolívar, Venezuela
- Died: January 24, 2018 (aged 33); Ciudad Bolívar, Bolívar, Venezuela
- Batted: Right Threw: Right

MLB debut
- April 6, 2005, for the Colorado Rockies

Last MLB appearance
- September 29, 2007, for the Florida Marlins

MLB statistics
- Win–loss record: 0–2
- Earned run average: 5.21
- Strikeouts: 49
- Stats at Baseball Reference

Teams
- Colorado Rockies (2005); Florida Marlins (2007)

Marcos José Carvajal (Spanish pronunciation: [ˈmaɾkos xoˈse kaɾβaˈxal]; August 19, 1984 – January 24, 2018) was a Venezuelan professional baseball relief pitcher. He played in Major League Baseball (MLB) for the Colorado Rockies and Florida Marlins. Listed at 6' 4", (1.93 m), 175 lb. (79 k), Carvajal batted and threw right-handed.

== Career ==
Carvajal was originally signed as an undrafted free agent by the Los Angeles Dodgers in 2000.

On May 3, 2004, for the Single-A Columbus Catfish, Carvajal combined with starter Chuck Tiffany for a seven-inning no-hitter. Tiffany pitched the first five innings followed by Carvajal, who threw the final two innings. He then was selected in the Rule 5 draft by the Milwaukee Brewers on December 13, 2004. On that same day, the Colorado Rockies acquired him for cash or a player to be named later.

Carvajal made his major league debut on April 6, 2005, with the Colorado Rockies, as he became the youngest player in Rockies history at 20 years and 230 days old, beating Jamey Wright's previous record of 21 years and 191 days old. He then spent the whole 2005 season with the Rockies because he was a Rule 5 draft choice; if he had been taken off the roster, the Dodgers would have had the right to claim him back.

On December 7, 2005, Carvajal was traded to the Seattle Mariners for catcher Yorvit Torrealba. On April 6, 2006, he was sent to the Tampa Bay Devil Rays in exchange for a minor leaguer. He would then spend the whole 2006 season with the Double-A Montgomery Biscuits, posting a 3.86 ERA in 72.1 innings.

On February 16, 2007, Carvajal was claimed off waivers by the New York Mets. He began the year for the Double-A Binghamton Mets, where he was converted to a starter.

On September 7, 2007, the Mets designated him for assignment and on September 12, and he was claimed off waivers by the Florida Marlins. He was released by the Marlins on July 6, 2008. After that Carvajal pitched until 2011 in the Minors, Italian Baseball, Mexican League, and the Venezuelan Winter League.

== Death ==
Carvajal died on January 24, 2018, in Ciudad Bolívar at the age of 33 of pneumonia due to medicine shortages in Venezuela.

== See also ==
- List of Major League Baseball players from Venezuela
