= Scott Dohmann =

American baseball pitcher (born 1978)

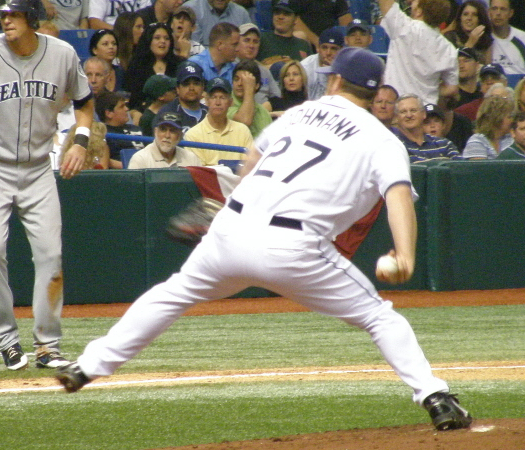
- Pitcher
- Born: February 13, 1978 (age 48); New Orleans, Louisiana, U.S.
- Batted: Switch Threw: Right

Professional debut
- MLB: May 15, 2004, for the Colorado Rockies
- NPB: April 5, 2009, for the Hiroshima Toyo Carp

Last appearance
- MLB: May 7, 2008, for the Tampa Bay Rays
- NPB: June 11, 2009, for the Hiroshima Toyo Carp

MLB statistics
- Win–loss record: 9–8
- Earned run average: 5.32
- Strikeouts: 166

NPB statistics
- Win–loss record: 0–0
- Earned run average: 17.28
- Strikeouts: 4
- Stats at Baseball Reference

Teams
- Colorado Rockies (2004–2006); Kansas City Royals (2006); Tampa Bay Devil Rays / Rays (2007–2008); Hiroshima Toyo Carp (2009)

Christopher Scott Dohmann (born February 13, 1978) is an American former baseball pitcher. Dohmann graduated from St. Thomas More High School (LA) where he was a member of two district champion teams. He attended the University of Louisiana at Lafayette where he pitched in the 2000 College World Series.

== Professional career ==
=== Colorado Rockies ===
Dohmann was drafted by the Colorado Rockies in the sixth round of the 2000 MLB draft. He made his major league debut on May 15, 2004, against the Philadelphia Phillies, allowing two runs in two innings of work. He pitched in 41 games for the Rockies in 2004, 32 in 2005 and 27 in 2006. On April 28, 2006, Dohmann picked up his only major league save, nailing down a Rockies extra inning victory over the Marlins.

=== Kansas City Royals ===
On July 31, 2006, he and Ryan Shealy were traded from the Rockies to the Kansas City Royals for Jeremy Affeldt and Denny Bautista. He appeared in 21 games for the Royals, finishing 1–3 with a 7.99 ERA.

=== Tampa Bay Devil Rays/Tampa Bay Rays ===
On January 22, 2007, the Tampa Bay Devil Rays signed him as a free agent. He was in 31 games with the Devil Rays in 2007, finishing 3–0 with a 3.31 ERA and in 2008 he was 2–0 with a 6.14 ERA in 12 games with the Rays.

=== Hiroshima Toyo Carp ===
On October 15, 2008, the Rays granted free agency to Dohmann and he signed with the Hiroshima Toyo Carp on December 17, 2008.

=== Arizona Diamondbacks ===
In June 2009 Dohmann was released by the Japanese team and signed a minor league contract with the Arizona Diamondbacks where he spent the remainder of the season with the Reno Aces of the Pacific Coast League. He was 0–1 with a 6.75 ERA in 14 appearances for the Aces.

=== Los Angeles Dodgers ===
On January 11, 2010, Dohmann signed a minor league contract with the Los Angeles Dodgers with an invite to spring training. He was assigned to the Triple-A Albuquerque Isotopes. In 47 games with the Isotopes, he was 1–2 with a 5.82 ERA and 16 saves.
