= Randy Williams (baseball) =

American baseball player (born 1975)

- Pitcher
- Born: September 18, 1975 (age 50); Harlingen, Texas, U.S.
- Batted: Left Threw: Left

Professional debut
- MLB: September 11, 2004, for the Seattle Mariners
- NPB: May 4, 2012, for the Saitama Seibu Lions

Last appearance
- MLB: August 5, 2011, for the Boston Red Sox
- NPB: October 3, 2014, for the Saitama Seibu Lions

MLB statistics
- Win–loss record: 3–4
- Earned run average: 5.82
- Strikeouts: 75

NPB statistics
- Win–loss record: 11–9
- Earned run average: 2.25
- Strikeouts: 145
- Stats at Baseball Reference

Teams
- Seattle Mariners (2004); San Diego Padres (2005); Colorado Rockies (2005); Chicago White Sox (2009–2010); Boston Red Sox (2011); Saitama Seibu Lions (2012–2014)
Medals
Men's baseball
Representing United States
Pan American Games
Silver medal – second place	2011 Guadalajara	National team

Randall Duane Williams (born September 18, 1975) is an American former professional baseball pitcher. He played with the Seattle Mariners, San Diego Padres, Colorado Rockies, Chicago White Sox and Boston Red Sox of Major League Baseball (MLB) from 2004 to 2011. Williams played college baseball for the Lamar University Cardinals.

== Career ==
Drafted by the Chicago Cubs in the 12th round of the 1997 MLB draft, Williams was released by the Cubs on March 24, 2001. He played all of 2002 with the independent Central Baseball League for the Edinburg Roadrunners. In 42 games, he had a 1.42 ERA and 77 strikeouts.

On September 30, 2002, he signed with the Seattle Mariners and made his MLB debut on September 11, 2004. He appeared in 6 games for the Mariners in 2004 and during the offseason, he was traded to the San Diego Padres for Billy Hogan. After appearing in just 2 games for the Padres in 2005, he was claimed off waivers by the Colorado Rockies. He went 2-1 with the Rockies the rest of the season and had a 5.73 ERA. He became a free agent at the end of the season.

In 2006, he re-signed with the Rockies and played the entire year for their Triple-A affiliate, the Colorado Springs Sky Sox. In 2007, Williams played in the Texas Rangers organization and in 2008, the Florida Marlins organization. He became a free agent at the end of the 2008 season and signed a minor league contract with an invitation to spring training the Chicago White Sox on January 12, 2009.

After the 2011 season, he elected for free agency.

In 2012, Williams signed with the Saitama Seibu Lions in Nippon Professional Baseball (NPB).
