= José Acevedo (baseball) =

Dominican baseball player (born 1977)

- Pitcher
- Born: December 18, 1977 (age 48); Santo Domingo, Dominican Republic
- Batted: Right Threw: Right

MLB debut
- June 19, 2001, for the Cincinnati Reds

Last MLB appearance
- September 29, 2005, for the Colorado Rockies

MLB statistics
- Win–loss record: 18–25
- Earned run average: 5.74
- Strikeout: 253
- Stats at Baseball Reference

Teams
- Cincinnati Reds (2001–2004); Colorado Rockies (2005)

José Omar Acevedo (born December 18, 1977) is a Dominican former right-handed Major League Baseball (MLB) pitcher who last played for the Baltimore Orioles organization. Acevedo played previously with the Cincinnati Reds from 2001 to 2004 and the Colorado Rockies from 2005 to 2006. In his five-year career, Acevedo has a career record of 18–25 with an ERA of 5.74. He is a cousin of Hall of Fame pitcher Juan Marichal. He has no relation to pitcher Juan Acevedo, as he is from Mexico. Acevedo was released by the Baltimore Orioles on March 12, 2007.
