= David Cortés (baseball) =

Mexican baseball player (born 1973)

- Relief pitcher
- Born: October 15, 1973 (age 52); Mexicali, Mexico
- Batted: Right Threw: Right

MLB debut
- August 30, 1999, for the Atlanta Braves

Last MLB appearance
- July 13, 2006, for the Colorado Rockies

MLB statistics
- Win–loss record: 5–1
- Earned run average: 4.47
- Strikeouts: 53

KBO statistics
- Win–loss record: 2–1
- Earned run average: 2.84
- Strikeouts: 10
- Stats at Baseball Reference

Teams
- Atlanta Braves (1999); Cleveland Indians (2003); Colorado Rockies (2005–2006); Lotte Giants (2008)

David Cárdenas Cortés (born October 15, 1973) is a Mexican former professional baseball pitcher. He has played in Major League Baseball for the Atlanta Braves (1999), Cleveland Indians (2003), and Colorado Rockies (2005–2006).

Cortés was a member of the Mexicali, Mexico, team who were the runners-up of the 1985 Little League World Series. As a teenager, he left his family to attend high school and play baseball in El Centro, California. He was undrafted out of high school and next played college baseball at Imperial Valley College where he did not attract any attention from scouts. His grades were too poor for a four-year school and, after finishing junior college at 19, took a job at a department store for $4.75 per hour (equivalent to $10.59 in 2025) while pitching for an amateur team in Tijuana. Three years later, in 1996, with a three-month-old daughter at home, he was convinced to attend a Cincinnati Reds tryout in San Diego. The Reds did not sign Cortés on the grounds that he was too short at 5 ft 11 in (1.80 m) but he was referred to an amateur team in San Diego, which he could afford to join only after being given $20 in gas money. Playing in San Diego, he impressed a Braves scout who was monitoring Marcus Giles; he received a signing bonus of $2,500 from the Braves.

On December 8, 2006, Cortés signed with the San Francisco Giants, but before pitching for the Giants, he was loaned to the Triple-A Mexican League where in 2008 he made the midseason All-Star team. Cortés signed with the Lotte Giants of the Korea Baseball Organization in August 2008 and served as their closer until the end of the season.
