= Eddy Garabito =

Dominican baseball player (born 1976)

- Second baseman
- Born: December 2, 1976 (age 49); Bajos de Haina, Dominican Republic
- Batted: Switch Threw: Right

MLB debut
- May 27, 2005, for the Colorado Rockies

Last MLB appearance
- August 8, 2005, for the Colorado Rockies

MLB statistics
- Batting average: .307
- Home runs: 1
- Runs batted in: 8
- Stats at Baseball Reference

Former teams
- Colorado Rockies (2005)

Eddy Jorge Garabito (born December 2, 1976) is a Dominican former Major League Baseball (MLB) second baseman. He played for the St. George Roadrunners of the Golden Baseball League and played in MLB for the Colorado Rockies and in the minor leagues for the Baltimore Orioles.
