= Ryan Shealy =

American baseball player (born 1979)

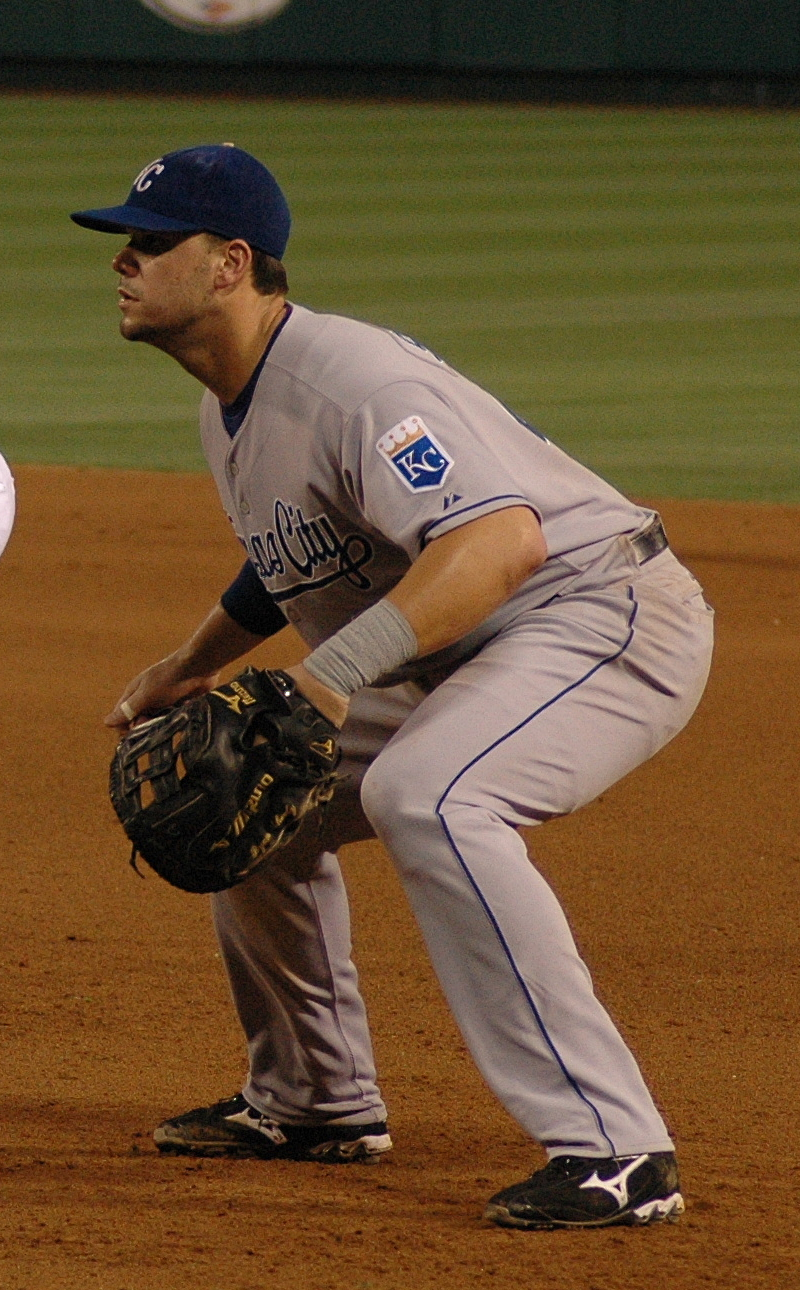
- Shealy with the Kansas City Royals
- First baseman
- Born: August 29, 1979 (age 46); Fort Lauderdale, Florida, U.S.
- Batted: Right Threw: Right

MLB debut
- June 14, 2005, for the Colorado Rockies

Last MLB appearance
- July 20, 2010, for the Boston Red Sox

MLB statistics
- Batting average: .268
- Home runs: 19
- Runs batted in: 94
- Stats at Baseball Reference

Teams
- Colorado Rockies (2005–2006); Kansas City Royals (2006–2008); Boston Red Sox (2010)

Ryan Nelson Shealy (born August 29, 1979) is an American former professional baseball player who played six seasons in Major League Baseball as a first baseman. Shealy played college baseball for the University of Florida, and thereafter, he played professionally for the Colorado Rockies, Kansas City Royals and Boston Red Sox.

Shealy was born in Fort Lauderdale, Florida. He attended Cardinal Gibbons High School in Fort Lauderdale, where he played high school baseball for the Cardinal Gibbons Chiefs.

Shealy received an athletic scholarship to attend the University of Florida in Gainesville, Florida, and played for coach Andy Lopez and coach Pat McMahon's Florida Gators baseball teams from 1998 to 2002. He graduated from Florida with a bachelor's degree in advertising in 2002.

The Colorado Rockies selected Shealy in the 11th round of the 2002 Major League Baseball draft. Shealy began his career playing for the Casper Rockies (now the Grand Junction Rockies), an advanced rookie team that is part of the Pioneer Baseball League. He won the USA Baseball Richard W. "Dick" Case Player of the Year Award in 2005.

Shealy made his major league debut on June 14, 2005. In his rookie year, he compiled an impressive .330 batting average (30–for–91) with two home runs, 16 RBI, and no errors in 36 games played. Shealy was the Rockies' primary backup to starting first baseman and five-time All-Star Todd Helton, and was also the designated hitter during interleague games in 2005. Shealy also played in 2005 for the Triple-A Colorado Springs Sky Sox.

Shealy played all of 2006 in Triple-A prior to the All-Star Game, batting .284 with 15 home runs and 55 RBI in 58 games. On July 31, 2006, he was traded to the Kansas City Royals for Jeremy Affeldt and Denny Bautista. He made a big impact, hitting .280 with seven home runs and 36 RBI in 51 games, before being stopped by illness.

On December 17, 2009, Shealy signed a minor league contract with the Tampa Bay Rays with an invitation to spring training.

On June 17, 2010, he signed a minor league deal with the Boston Red Sox. He was called up on July 7, due to an injury to Kevin Youkilis. He was outrighted to the Triple-A Pawtucket Red Sox two weeks later, after going hitless in seven at-bats. On August 14, 2010, the Boston Red Sox released Shealy.

He played in 2011 in the Toronto Blue Jays organization with the Triple-A Las Vegas 51s. In 62 games, he hit .272 with 11 home runs and 56 RBI.

== See also ==
- Florida Gators
- List of Florida Gators baseball players
- List of University of Florida alumni
