= Jamey Wright =

American baseball player (born 1974)

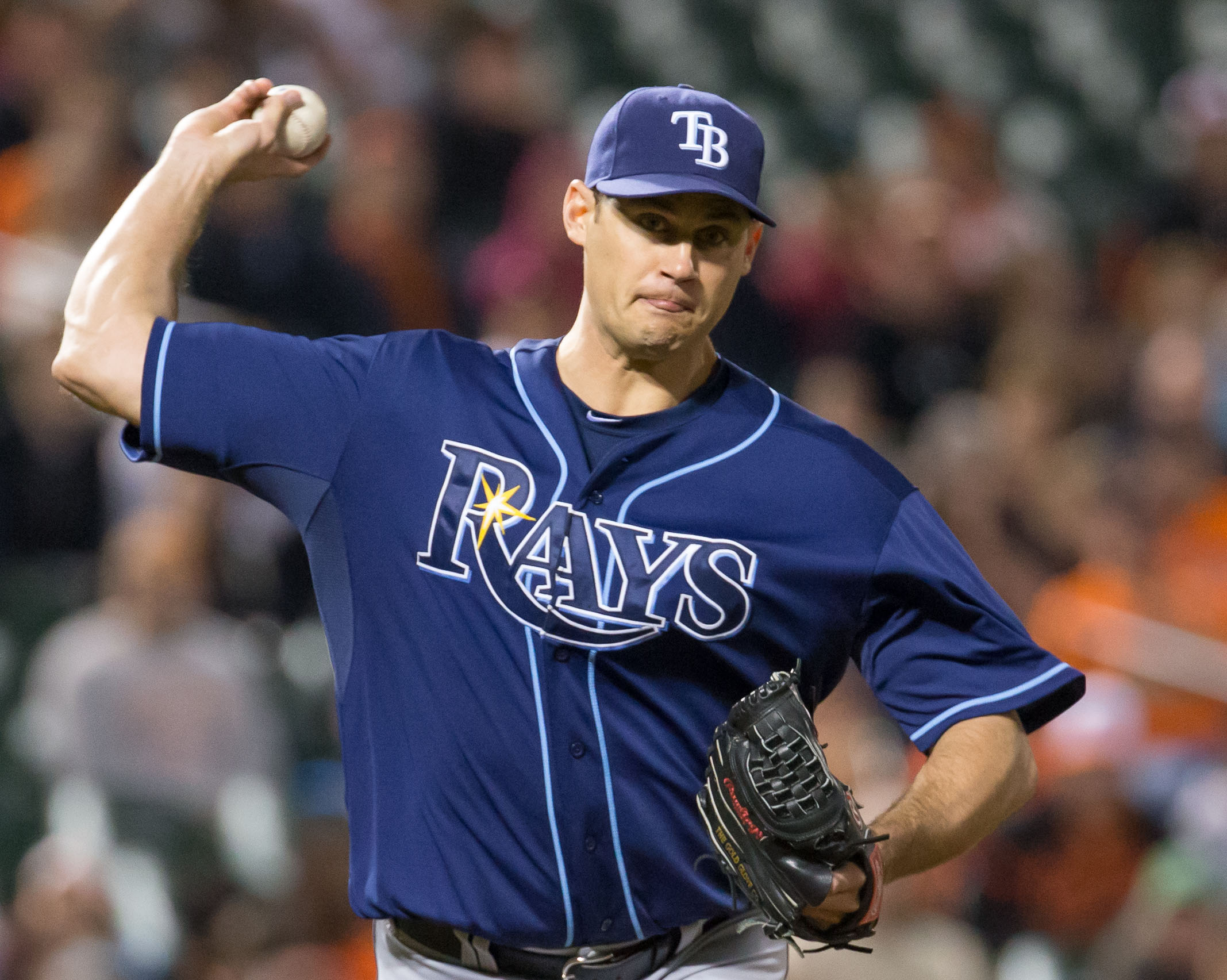
- Wright with the Tampa Bay Rays
- Pitcher
- Born: December 24, 1974 (age 50); Oklahoma City, Oklahoma, U.S.
- Batted: Right Threw: Right

MLB debut
- July 3, 1996, for the Colorado Rockies

Last MLB appearance
- September 27, 2014, for the Los Angeles Dodgers

MLB statistics
- Win–loss record: 97–130
- Earned run average: 4.81
- Strikeouts: 1,189
- Stats at Baseball Reference

Teams
- Colorado Rockies (1996–1999); Milwaukee Brewers (2000–2002); St. Louis Cardinals (2002); Kansas City Royals (2003); Colorado Rockies (2004–2005); San Francisco Giants (2006); Texas Rangers (2007–2008); Kansas City Royals (2009); Cleveland Indians (2010); Seattle Mariners (2010–2011); Los Angeles Dodgers (2012); Tampa Bay Rays (2013); Los Angeles Dodgers (2014)

Jamey Alan Wright (born December 24, 1974) is an American former professional baseball pitcher. He played for 10 different teams in Major League Baseball (MLB): the Colorado Rockies, Milwaukee Brewers, St. Louis Cardinals, Kansas City Royals, San Francisco Giants, Texas Rangers, Cleveland Indians, Seattle Mariners, Los Angeles Dodgers, and Tampa Bay Rays. Wright batted and threw right-handed.

An Oklahoma City native, Wright was a first round draft pick of the Rockies in 1993. He reached the majors with them in 1996 and was part of their starting rotation through the 1999 season. Traded to Milwaukee before the 2000 season, he became the Brewers' Opening Day starter in 2001, winning a career-high 11 games. After being traded to St. Louis during the 2002 season, he spent most of 2003 in the minor leagues, then pitched for the Rockies again in 2004 and 2005. He was named the fifth starter for the Giants and the Rangers in 2006 and 2007, respectively, but both times he was removed from the rotation during the year. After the 2007 season, he served almost exclusively as a reliever.

With the Rangers in 2008, Wright tied for third in the American League (AL) with 75 games pitched. He spent 2009 with the Royals, split 2010 between the Indians and Mariners, and spent 2011 with the Mariners. After a year with the Dodgers in 2012, he reached the playoffs for the first time in his 18th season, with the Rays in 2013. He pitched one final year for the Dodgers in 2014, then retired after failing to make an MLB roster in 2015 and 2016. In 719 appearances (248 starts), he had a 97–130 record and a 4.81 earned run average.

== Early life ==
Jamey Alan Wright was born on December 24, 1974, in Oklahoma City, Oklahoma. Growing up, he was part of three Little League Baseball championship teams. He attended Oklahoma City's Westmoore High School, where he was a second team High School All-American and the Southwest Region Gatorade Player of the Year in 1993. As a senior that year, he had a 7–2 record and an 0.57 earned run average (ERA), with 94 strikeouts in 62 innings pitched, leading Westmoore to a third-place finish in the state tournament. Wright also lettered in basketball at Westmoore. He was the first baseball player from Westmoore to reach the major leagues, followed by Kyle Tyler in 2021.

== Professional career ==
=== Colorado Rockies, first stint ===
Wright was drafted in the first round of the 1993 Major League Baseball (MLB) draft by the Colorado Rockies, the 28th overall pick. He began his professional career with eight starts for the rookie-level Arizona League Rockies in 1993 and was promoted to the Class A Asheville Tourists in 1994. Wright split 1995 between the Single-A advanced Salem Avalanche and the Double-A New Haven Ravens in 1995, then played with New Haven and the Triple-A Colorado Springs Sky Sox in 1996. According to sportswriter Larry Stone, he "dominated" in the minor leagues.

Wright made his Major League debut when he started for the Rockies against the San Francisco Giants on July 3, 1996, allowing one run in six innings. He recorded his first major league win with a seven-inning start against the Giants on July 17, where he allowed only one earned run. The pitcher also recorded his first major league hit that day, a double against Osvaldo Fernández, though he injured his knee when sliding into second base. The injury did not end his season; Wright started 16 games (and made 1 relief appearance) in 1996, finishing with a 4–4 record and a 4.93 ERA in his debut season. He had arthroscopic surgery to repair the knee, then slipped on some ice in the off-season, requiring a second surgery.

Recovered by 1997, Wright made the Rockies roster out of spring training. He spent most of the season with Colorado, other than a stretch from May 15 through June 8 when he was on the disabled list with right shoulder inflammation and a stint from June 18 through July 2 when he was demoted to Colorado Springs. He pitched his first complete game with a 7–1 win over the Chicago Cubs on July 24, giving up a solo home run to Sammy Sosa. He made 26 starts for the Rockies in 1997, posting an 8–12 record and a 6.25 ERA.

The 1998 season saw Wright spend the whole year in Colorado's starting rotation, setting what would be career highs in starts (34) and innings pitched (206 1/3). On August 5, he hit a two-run home run against Francisco Córdova and pitched a complete game in a 6–2 victory over the Pittsburgh Pirates. He had a 9–14 record, a 5.67 ERA, and 86 strikeouts. Wright finished ninth in the National League (NL) with 235 hits allowed.

After posting a 7.58 ERA in his first four starts of 1999, Wright was demoted to Colorado Springs. In 17 games (16 starts) for Colorado Springs, he had a 5–7 record, posting a slightly lower ERA at 6.46. Recalled on August 2, he posted a 4.18 ERA the rest of the season for the Rockies. He won four straight decisions from August 22 to September 20, the best winning streak of his career. In 16 starts for Colorado, he had a 4–3 record and a 4.87 ERA.

=== Milwaukee Brewers ===
On December 30, 1999, Wright and Henry Blanco were traded to the Milwaukee Brewers in a three-team trade in which the Oakland Athletics sent Jimmy Haynes to Milwaukee, the Rockies sent Justin Miller to the Athletics, and the Brewers sent Jeff Cirillo and Scott Karl to the Rockies. He began the 2000 season on the disabled list with a right rotator cuff tear, but he joined the starting rotation after being activated on May 23. Despite entering August with a 6–4 record, Wright won only one more game for the Brewers all season, giving up four runs (three earned) over 7 1/3 innings in a 7–4 victory over the Cincinnati Reds on September 26. In 26 games (25 starts), he had a 7–9 record and a 4.10 ERA. Wright led the NL with 18 hit batsmen.

The Brewers tapped Wright to open the 2001 season, starting on April 2 against the Los Angeles Dodgers. He went seven innings, allowing the only run of the 1–0 loss with a solo homer to Gary Sheffield. He threw his first shutout on April 29, allowing just two hits in a 10–0 triumph over the Montreal Expos. Wright missed some time from May 21 through June 10, when he was on the disabled list recovering from a right intercostal strain. On June 28, he hit three Pirates over 6 2/3 innings but allowed just one run, though that was all the scoring in a 1–0 loss to Pittsburgh. He struck out a career-high 12 batters over 8 2/3 innings on August 31 against the Houston Astros, though he took the loss in a 3–2 defeat. From July 19 through September 5, Wright hit a batter in 10 straight starts, the longest streak in the major leagues since 1970. Wright had a career-high 11 wins in 2001 and struck out over 100 batters (129) for the first time, posting an 11–12 record and a 4.90 ERA. His 20 hit batsmen tied Chan Ho Park for the league lead and set a Brewers single-season record. After the season, on October 30, he had arthroscopic surgery to remove a bone spur from his right elbow.

Wright fell to third in Milwaukee's rotation in 2002, behind Ben Sheets and Rubén Quevedo. He was placed on the disabled list with a right rotator cuff tear after his first start of the year on April 4; Wright did not return until May 24. On July 1, he allowed just three hits in a 2–0 shutout of the Pirates. Through August 30, he had a 5–13 record and a 5.35 ERA.

=== St. Louis Cardinals ===
On July 1, 2002, Wright was traded with cash to the St. Louis Cardinals for a player to be named later (Mike Matthews) and Chris Morris. Wright had a 2–0 record in four appearances (three starts) for the Cardinals, with a 4.80 ERA. In 23 games (22 starts) total in 2002, he had a 7–13 record and a 5.29 ERA. The Cardinals won the NL Central title and advanced to the NL Championship Series (NLCS), losing to the Giants, but Wright was not part of the playoff roster. In 2013, when Wright expressed his desire to make an appearance in the playoffs, he told reporters that his time with St. Louis "definitely does not count." After the season, he became a free agent.

=== Journeyman ===
On January 28, 2003, Wright signed with the Seattle Mariners. It was a one-year, minor league contract with a $400,000 option if he made the majors. He spent most of spring training with them but was released on March 18, the last player cut prior to the regular season. He re-signed with the Brewers organization on March 26. After he appeared in seven games (four starts) with the Triple-A Indianapolis Indians, he was released on April 28. He was then signed by the Texas Rangers on May 7, and he made seven starts for the Triple-A Oklahoma RedHawks, where he was 2–1 with a 4.12 ERA. Texas released him on June 15, and he signed with the Kansas City Royals on June 20. He made 13 appearances (12 starts) with the Triple-A Omaha Royals and was 3–5 with a 3.64 ERA. The Royals called him up to the majors on September 6, and he pitched a complete game that day against the Anaheim Angels, though the team from California won 3–1. His next start, on September 13 against the Detroit Tigers, was a complete-game shutout as the Royals beat the Tigers 7–0. With Kansas City, he was 1–2 with a 4.26 ERA in four starts. After the season, he became a free agent.

Wright signed with the Cubs on December 29, 2003, but was released before the start of the 2004 season on March 27. He signed a minor league deal with the Royals on April 2 and made 18 starts in Omaha, where he was 8–6 with a 4.21 ERA. Wright made the Triple-A All-Star Game but was released on July 21.

=== Colorado Rockies, second stint ===
A day after being released by the Royals, Wright re-signed with the Rockies and was added to the starting rotation. Making his MLB season debut on July 24, he held the Arizona Diamondbacks to one run in five innings, earning his first victory since September 13 of the previous season. However, he won just one more game all season, holding the Giants to one run in seven innings on September 1 in a 4–1 triumph. He was 2–3 with a 4.12 ERA in 14 starts in 2004.

After the 2004 season, Wright became a free agent, but he re-signed with the Rockies on December 22, 2004. He spent most of the 2005 season in their rotation. From June 4 through 16, he threw 14 1/3 consecutive scoreless innings. After beating the Giants on August 2, Wright proceeded to lose his next five starts. After posting a 6–16 record and a 5.71 ERA, the Rockies moved Wright to the bullpen at the end of August to make room for Zach Day and Sunny Kim in Colorado's rotation. "This could be the beginning of the second half of my career, and I would like it to be here," Wright said of the move. He was 8–16 with a 5.46 ERA in 34 appearances (27 starts) in 2005. Wright's 16 losses were topped only by Kip Wells's 18 in the NL. After the season, he became a free agent.

=== San Francisco Giants ===
Wright signed a minor league contract with the Giants on January 17, 2006. He went to spring training in 2006 as a non-roster invitee. Following a strong performance there, in which Wright pitched nine scoreless innings, the Giants promoted him to the major leagues as their No. 5 starter. Wright beat out Brad Hennessey for the job. On May 16, he allowed three runs in seven innings, earning the win against the Astros in a 14–3 triumph. The win was his first ever victory against Houston after 12 losses, the most by a starting pitcher to start his career against any team since Don Sutton lost his first 13 decisions against the Cubs from 1966 to 1969. On August 11, Giants' manager Felipe Alou announced that Hennessey would replace the struggling Wright in the rotation. At the time, Wright was 6–10 with a 5.18 ERA, but since May 22 his record had been 1–7 with a 6.40 ERA. Trouble locating his pitches and a flat sinkerball contributed to his struggles. Overall, he appeared in 34 games, making 21 starts in 2006 with a 6–10 record and 5.19 ERA. According to sportswriter Rich Draper, Wright "fell far short of expectations in 2006." However, he did lead NL pitchers in batting with a .261 average. On November 1, 2006, the Giants declined their option on Wright for the 2007 season, making him a free agent.

=== Texas Rangers ===
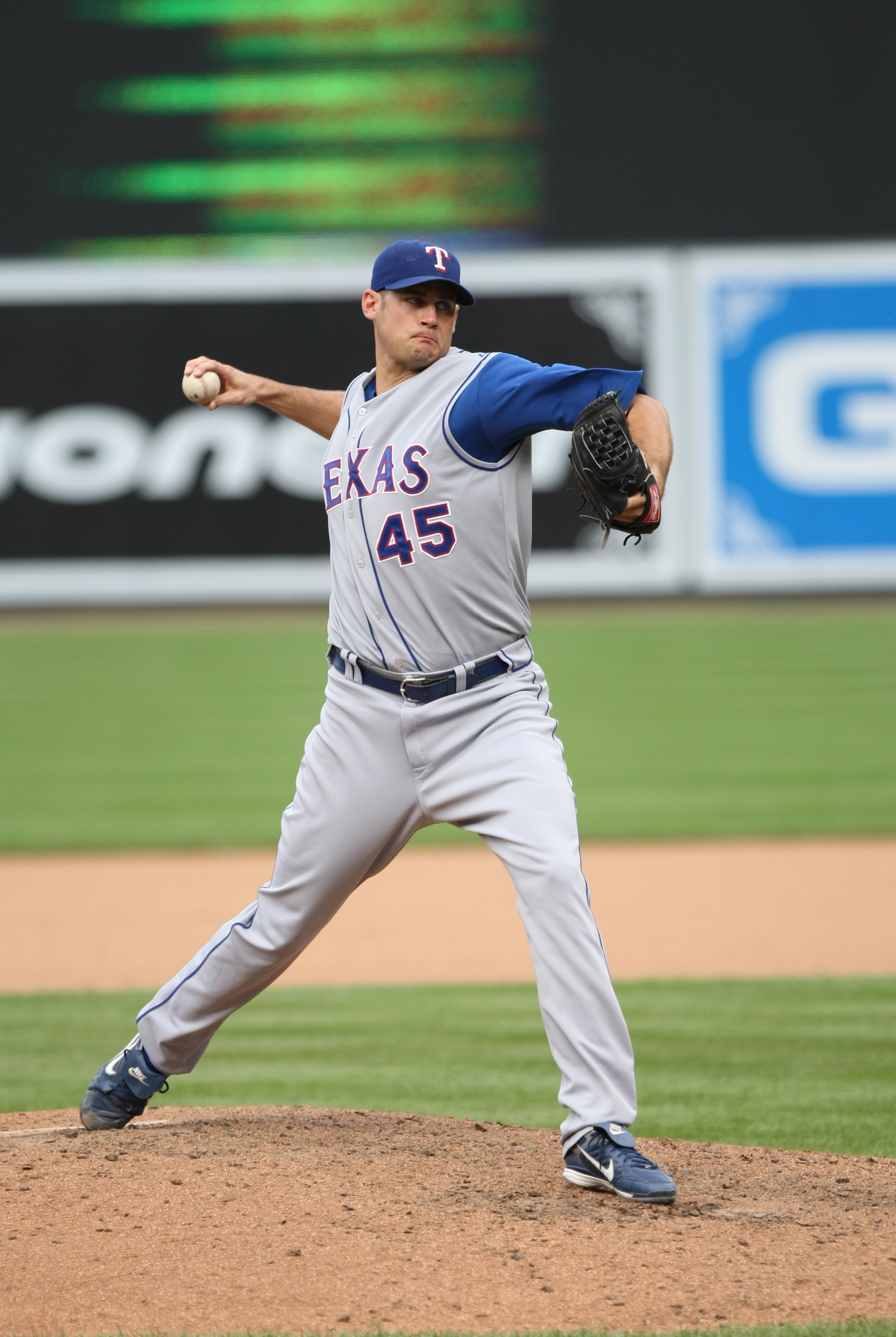
Wright during his tenure with the Rangers in 2008

On January 25, 2007, the Texas Rangers signed Wright to a minor-league contract with an invitation to spring training. He competed with Kameron Loe and Bruce Chen for a spot in the starting rotation. Winning the fifth spot, Wright made one short start for the Rangers on April 10 before being placed on the 15-day disabled list with right shoulder inflammation. After four rehab starts, he was activated on June 15. "My arm strength is good. I'm ready to go and to get back out there," he said. He rejoined the rotation upon being activated on June 15, posting a 3–4 record and a 4.57 ERA through August 3. Long opposed to pitching exclusively in relief, Wright reluctantly moved to the bullpen during the 2007 season, starting just one game for the rest of the season. The transition would be permanent, as he would start just two more games for the rest of his career. In 20 games (nine starts), he had a 4–5 record and a 3.62 ERA, his finest to that point.

Remaining with the Rangers in 2008, Wright pitched exclusively out of the bullpen, posting an 8–7 record and a 5.12 ERA. His 75 games pitched tied with Dennys Reyes for third in the AL, behind Matt Guerrier's and Francisco Rodríguez's 76. Wright also had the second-most wins of AL relievers and the third-most innings pitched (84 1/3). After the season, he became a free agent.

=== Kansas City Royals ===
On February 10, 2009, Wright signed a minor league contract with the Royals and was invited to spring training. He was the only non-roster invitee that year to be named to the team's Opening Day roster. He had a 1.66 ERA through May 16 and also pitched scoreless ball in seven games in a row from August 6 through 22. Wright struggled to hold inherited runners, however, allowing 22 of 47 to score. He was 3–5 with a 4.33 ERA in 65 games. After the season, he became a free agent.

=== Cleveland Indians and Seattle Mariners ===
On February 9, 2010, Wright signed a minor league contract with the Cleveland Indians with an invitation to spring training. He made the team and was 1–2 with a 5.48 ERA. On June 4, the Indians designated Wright for assignment. He was released six days later.

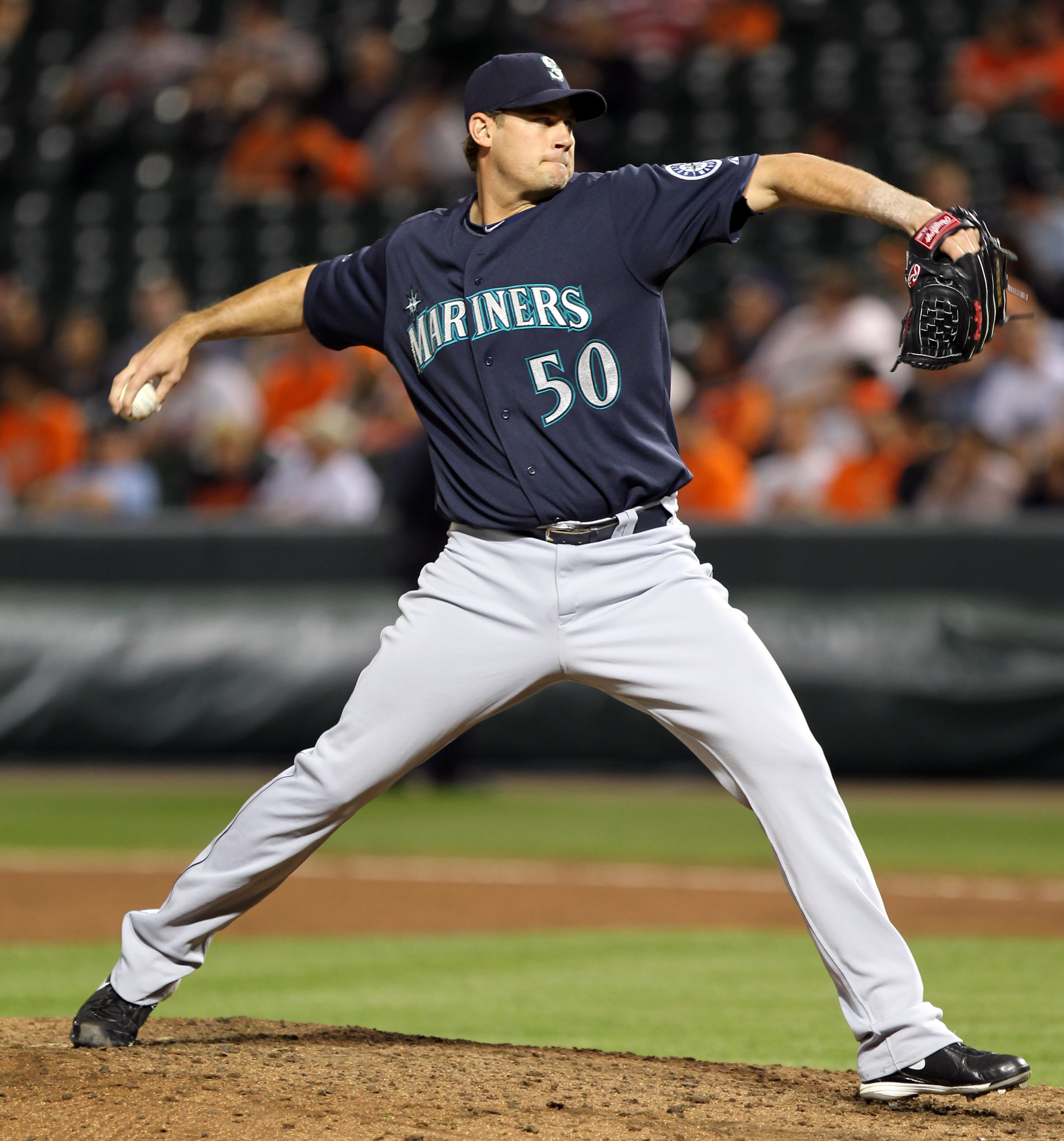
Wright pitching for the Mariners in 2011

Wright signed a minor league contract with the Oakland Athletics on June 16. He made 10 appearances with the Triple-A Sacramento River Cats, where he was 1–0 with a 9.00 ERA. On July 15, he opted out of his contract to sign with the Mariners, who added him to the major league roster. In 28 games for the Mariners, he had an 0–1 record and a 3.41 ERA. Over 46 games between Cleveland and Seattle, he had a 1–3 record and a 4.17 ERA.

Following the 2010 season, Wright became a free agent, but he resigned with Seattle for 2011. After Wright held opponents scoreless until his 10th game of 2011, Stone wrote that he had "become an increasingly vital member of Seattle's bullpen". On July 5, he earned his first career save, throwing a scoreless 10th inning in a 4–2 victory over Oakland. The save came in his 500th game; only Frank Tanana took more games (530) to get his first save. From July 29 to the end of the year, he had a 1.37 ERA in 19 games. In 60 games, he was 2–3 with a 3.16 ERA. He became a free agent after the season.

=== Los Angeles Dodgers, first stint ===
On February 7, 2012, Wright signed a minor league contract with the Los Angeles Dodgers that contained a spring training invitation. He was added to the roster before the start of the season on March 27. Wright pitched better at Dodger Stadium than on the road, posting a 5–0 record and a 1.71 ERA at home versus an 0–3 record and a 5.50 ERA in away games. He allowed no runs in 15 of his last 17 games. In 66 games, he had a 5–3 record and 3.72 ERA. After the season, he became a free agent.

=== Tampa Bay Rays ===
On January 22, 2013, Wright signed a minor league contract with the Tampa Bay Rays. By this time, he was one of three players in the last three decades to play for at least 17 years and never make the playoffs. His contract was selected by the Rays on March 31. On September 1, with the Rays facing a predominantly left-handed Oakland lineup, Rays manager Joe Maddon elected to skip right-handed starter Roberto Hernández's start in favor of a bullpen game handled mostly by left-handers. Wright, making his first start since 2007, allowed one run in 1 2/3 innings and left with the game tied, but Oakland won 5–1. He finished the season with a 2–2 record in 66 appearances, and his 3.09 ERA was the lowest of his career.

Wright finally reached the playoffs, as the Rays won a wild card berth and defeated the Indians in the AL Wild Card Game. He made two appearances in the AL Division Series (ALDS) against the Red Sox. In Game 1, he finished a game the Rays trailed 8–2, allowing four runs in the eighth inning of a 12–2 loss at Fenway Park. He relieved Jeremy Hellickson with no outs and the bases loaded in the second inning of Game 4, getting out of the inning with no runs scoring by striking out Jarrod Saltalamacchia and inducing Stephen Drew to hit into a double play. However, Tampa ultimately lost the game 3–1 and was eliminated from the playoffs. After the season, he became a free agent.

=== Los Angeles Dodgers, second stint ===
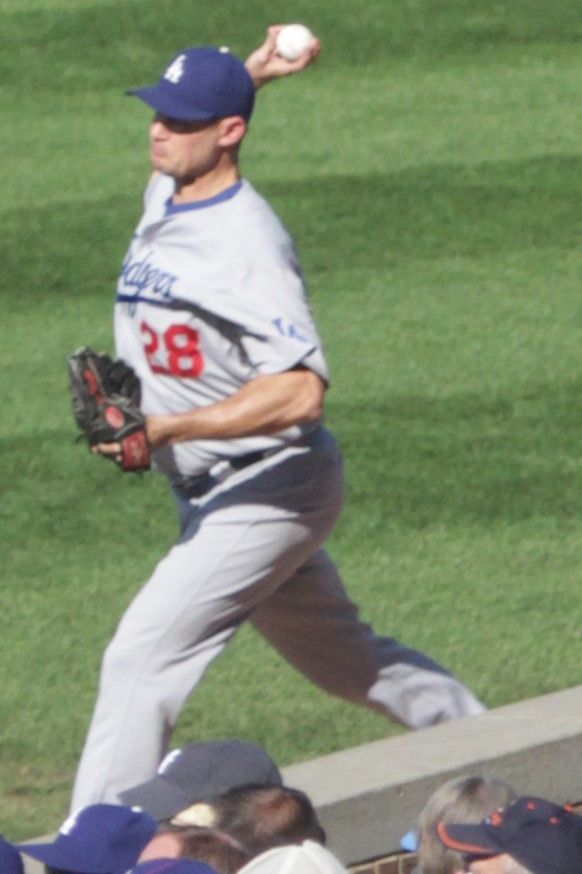
Wright pitching for the Dodgers in 2014

On December 24, 2013, the Dodgers announced that they had signed Wright to a one-year Major League contract, the first time since 2005 that he was guaranteed a spot on the roster coming into spring training. He pitched better in the first half of the season than the second half, posting a 3.50 ERA prior to the All-Star break and a 5.74 ERA thereafter. On September 21, he filled in for a start against the Cubs. Though he hoped to last five or six innings, he only pitched two. He allowed one run in an eventual 8–5 victory. Wright appeared in 61 games, posting a 5–4 record and a 4.35 ERA. The Dodgers won the NL West, and Wright was part of the playoff roster, though he did not pitch as Los Angeles was eliminated by the Cardinals in four games in the NLDS. After the season, he became a free agent.

=== End of career and statistics ===
On February 14, 2015, Wright signed a minor league contract with the Rangers. However, he was released on March 31 when he was unable to make the roster during spring training. He sat out the rest of the season, then signed a minor league contract with the Dodgers on February 24, 2016. Unable to make the Dodgers Opening Day roster, he announced his retirement on March 28, 2016.

Wright pitched for 19 seasons in the major leagues. Of his 719 appearances, 248 were starts. He had a 97–130 record, a 4.81 ERA, 1,189 strikeouts, 978 walks, and 2,168 hits allowed in 2,036 2/3 innings. Wright hit 155 batters, which is tied for 18th all-time with Bert Blyleven, though Blyleven faced more than twice as many batters as Wright.

After retiring, Wright worked for his agent for a few years before rejoining the Dodgers organization in 2020 as a special assistant. In 2021, Wright was hired as the pitching coach for the Triple-A Oklahoma City Dodgers. He was replaced in 2022 by Dave Borkowski.

== Pitching style ==
Wright was a sinkerballer, throwing the pitch at 90–93 mph with an average speed of approximately 92 mph. He also threw a cut fastball at 88–90 mph and an occasional four-seamer in the low 90s. His main breaking ball was a sharp curveball which travelled around 77–81 mph. Wright had a tendency to get ground ball outs. Prior to the 2011 season, he threw a changeup; he stopped throwing it in 2011 and 2012 but brought it back about nine percent of the time in 2013. He threw a slider through 2007, bringing it back in 2010. Once he joined the Mariners in 2010, pitching coach Rick Adair encouraged him to lower his hands to waist-level before starting to throw, which generated a faster arm action. "I've learned to be more aggressive and attack the hitter a little more than I have in the past," he said in 2011.

== Personal life ==
Wright and his wife, Marnie, have one daughter, Presley, and two sons, Jett and Kingston. Presley's middle name, Kile, is in reference to Darryl Kile, Wright's former teammate. "I followed that guy around like a puppy dog. He helped me more than anybody else could," Wright said after Kile's untimely death in 2002. "He was a great person and a great friend." The Wrights currently live in Dallas, Texas. An Oklahoma native, the Oklahoma Sooners are his favorite college team; he wore the same gray "Oklahoma Sooners" shirt for many years during his career.

== See also ==
- List of Major League Baseball career hit batsmen leaders
