= Ryan Speier =

American baseball player (born 1979)

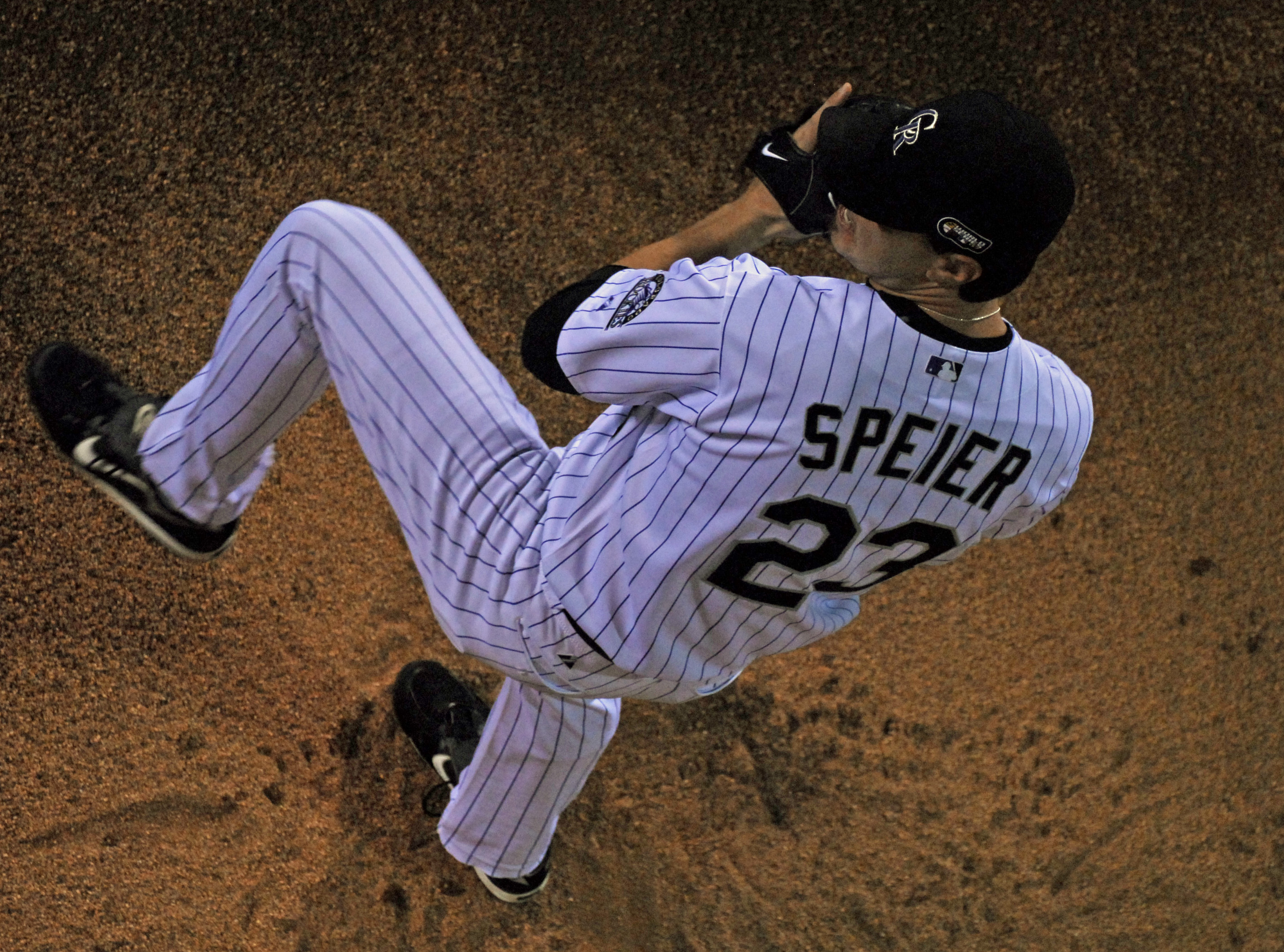
- Speier with the Colorado Rockies in 2007
- Relief pitcher
- Born: July 24, 1979 (age 47); Frankfort, Kentucky, U.S.
- Batted: Right Threw: Right

Professional debut
- MLB: April 4, 2005, for the Colorado Rockies
- NPB: April 12, 2011, for the Tohoku Rakuten Golden Eagles

Last appearance
- MLB: April 19, 2009, for the Colorado Rockies
- NPB: October 10, 2011, for the Tohoku Rakuten Golden Eagles

MLB statistics
- Win–loss record: 7–3
- Earned run average: 3.99
- Strikeouts: 58

NPB statistics
- Win–loss record: 1–4
- Earned run average: 4.60
- Strikeouts: 27
- Stats at Baseball Reference

Teams
- Colorado Rockies (2005, 2007–2009); Tohoku Rakuten Golden Eagles (2011)

Ryan Andrew Speier (born July 24, 1979) is an American former right-handed professional baseball pitcher. He played with the Colorado Rockies for his entire Major League Baseball (MLB) career, from 2005 when he was called up to July 24, 2009 when he was designated for assignment.

== Early life ==
=== High school ===
Speier was a standout pitcher at West Springfield High School in Springfield, Virginia along with Joe Saunders.

=== College ===
Speier attended Radford University in Virginia, where he was a standout pitcher for the Highlanders baseball team. In 2001, he played collegiate summer baseball for the Bourne Braves of the Cape Cod Baseball League (CCBL). Speier set a league record with 16 saves, and allowed only 10 hits, one walk, and one earned run in his 20 innings of relief. He was inducted into the CCBL Hall of Fame in 2013. Speier was signed by the Rockies in 2001 as an undrafted free agent.

== Professional career ==
=== Colorado Rockies ===
Speier won the Minor League Rolaids Relief Award in 2004 and set the single season saves record for the Texas League (AA) with 37. He was drafted and remained in the Colorado Rockies organization until the 2010 season. Speier sports a 3.22 ERA and 1.212 WHIP away from Coors Field and is praised for his ability to keep the ball in the ball park by only allowing four home runs in 99 1/3 innings. He is also a significantly more productive second half pitcher with a 2.38 ERA and 1.28 WHIP during his career with the Colorado Rockies.

=== Washington Nationals ===
On December 11, 2009, Speier signed a minor league contract with the Washington Nationals.

=== Southern Maryland Blue Crabs ===
He played at Southern Maryland Blue Crabs of Atlantic League in 2010.

=== Tohoku Rakuten Golden Eagles ===
On February 16, 2011, Speier signed with Tohoku Rakuten Golden Eagles of the Nippon Professional Baseball (NPB).

On April 12, 2011, Speier made his NPB debut. On November 29, 2011, he became free agent.
