= Masaumi Shimizu =

Japanese baseball player & coach (born 1975)

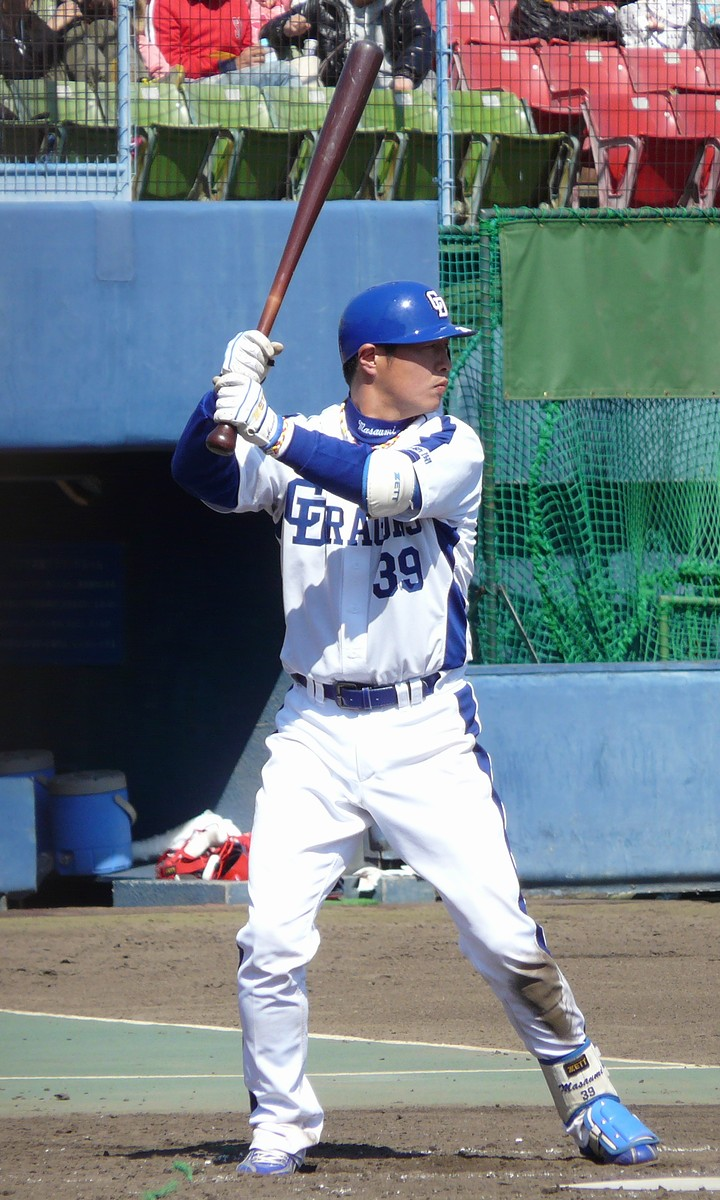
- Shimizu with the Chunichi Dragons when active player era.

Fukuoka SoftBank Hawks – No. 83
- Catcher / Coach
- Born: January 9, 1975 (age 50); Takasaki, Gunma, Japan
- Batted: Right Threw: Right

NPB debut
- April 5, 1997, for the Chiba Lotte Marines

Last NPB appearance
- August 9, 2011, for the Fukuoka SoftBank Hawks

NPB statistics
- Batting average: .212
- Home runs: 9
- Run batted in: 119
- Hits: 314

Teams
- As player: Chiba Lotte Marines (1997–2004); Chunichi Dragons (2005–2010); Fukuoka SoftBank Hawks (2010–2011); As coach: Fukuoka SoftBank Hawks (2012–2017); Chiba Lotte Marines (2018–2022); Fukuoka SoftBank Hawks (2023–present)

Career highlights and awards
- As player: 2× Japan Series champion (2007, 2011); As coach: Japan Series champion (2025)
- Last updated on: 7 December 2023

Masaumi Shimizu (清水 将海, Shimizu Masaumi; born January 9, 1975) is a Japanese former professional baseball catcher, and current second squad battery coach for the Fukuoka SoftBank Hawks of Nippon Professional Baseball (NPB). He played in NPB for the Chiba Lotte Marines, Chunichi Dragons, and Hawks.

== Early baseball career ==
Shimizu went on to Aoyama Gakuin University, where he won the 1996 Japan National Collegiate Baseball Championship with classmates Tadahito Iguchi, Shinji Kurano, and Toshikazu Sawazaki. They also defeated Sumitomo Metal Industries, a corporate baseball club, in the 1996 All-Japan Amateur Baseball Championship in their senior year.

== Professional career ==
=== Active player era ===
On November 21, 1996, Shimizu was drafted first round pick by the Chiba Lotte Marines in the 1996 Nippon Professional Baseball draft.

He debuted in the Pacific League in his rookie season of 1997, played in 77 games. During the 2001 season he became a regular catcher, playing in a career-high 123 games.

He played eight seasons for the Marines but was traded to the Chunichi Dragons after the 2004 season.

Shimizu played only 48 games in the Central League in five and a half seasons with the Dragons, and on June 25, 2010 he was traded to the Fukuoka SoftBank Hawks in exchange for Koji Mise.

He played one and a half seasons with the Hawks and announced his retirement on October 7, 2011.

In his 15-season career, Shimizu played a total of 683 games, batting .212 with 314 hits, nine home runs, and 119 RBI.

=== After retirement ===
After his retirement, Shimizu became the second squad battery coach for the Fukuoka Softbank Hawks in the 2012 season. He also served as a third squad battery coach from the 2014-2015 season and as a first squad coach from the 2016-2017 season.

He served as the first squad battery coach for the Chiba Lotte Marines from the 2018-2022 season.

On November 1, 2022, Shimizu announced at a press conference that he will serve as the fourth squad battery coach from the 2023 season.

On December 2, 2023, he was transferred to the second squad battery coach.
