= Shinji Kurano =

Japanese baseball player and coach (born 1974)

Fukuoka SoftBank Hawks – No. 94
- Pitcher / Coach
- Born: September 15, 1974 (age 51); Obata, Mie, Japan
- Batted: Right Threw: Right

NPB debut
- April 10, 1997, for the Fukuoka Daiei Hawks

Last NPB appearance
- May 20, 2006, for the Fukuoka SoftBank Hawks

NPB statistics
- Win–loss record: 19–9
- Earned run average: 4.59
- Strikeouts: 176
- Stats at Baseball Reference

Teams
- As player: Fukuoka Daiei Hawks/Fukuoka SoftBank Hawks (1997–2007); As coach: Fukuoka SoftBank Hawks (2009–2021); Texas Rangers (2023); Fukuoka SoftBank Hawks (2024–present)

Career highlights and awards
- As player: 2× Japan Series champion (1999, 2003); As coach: Japan Series champion (2025)
- Last updated on: 5 December 2023

Shinji Kurano (倉野 信次, Kurano Shinji; born September 15, 1974 in Obata, Mie, Japan) is a Japanese former professional baseball pitcher, and current first squad pitching coach for the Fukuoka SoftBank Hawks of Nippon Professional Baseball (NPB). He played in NPB for the Hawks from 1997 to 2007.

== Early baseball career ==
Kurano went on to Aoyama Gakuin University, where he won the 1996 Japan National Collegiate Baseball Championship with classmates Tadahito Iguchi, Masaumi Shimizu, and Toshikazu Sawazaki. They also defeated Sumitomo Metal Industries, a corporate baseball club, in the 1996 All-Japan Amateur Baseball Championship in their senior year.

== Professional career ==
=== Active player era ===
On November 21, 1996, Kurano was drafted fourth round pick by the Fukuoka Daiei Hawks in the 1996 Nippon Professional Baseball draft.

Kurano pitched in 164 games in 11 seasons with the Hawks, posting a record of 19 wins, 9 losses, and one save.

=== After retirement ===
Kurano worked as a team staff member for the Fukuoka SoftBank Hawks and served as their pitching coach from 2009 to the 2021 season.

He received coaching training for the Texas Rangers in Double-A and Triple-A during the 2022 season, and served as a coach for the 2023 season.

On October 31, 2023, Kurano again served as the first squad pitching coach of the Fukuoka SoftBank Hawks.
