= Hiroki Kuroda =

Japanese baseball player (born 1975)

Hiroki Kuroda 黒田 博樹
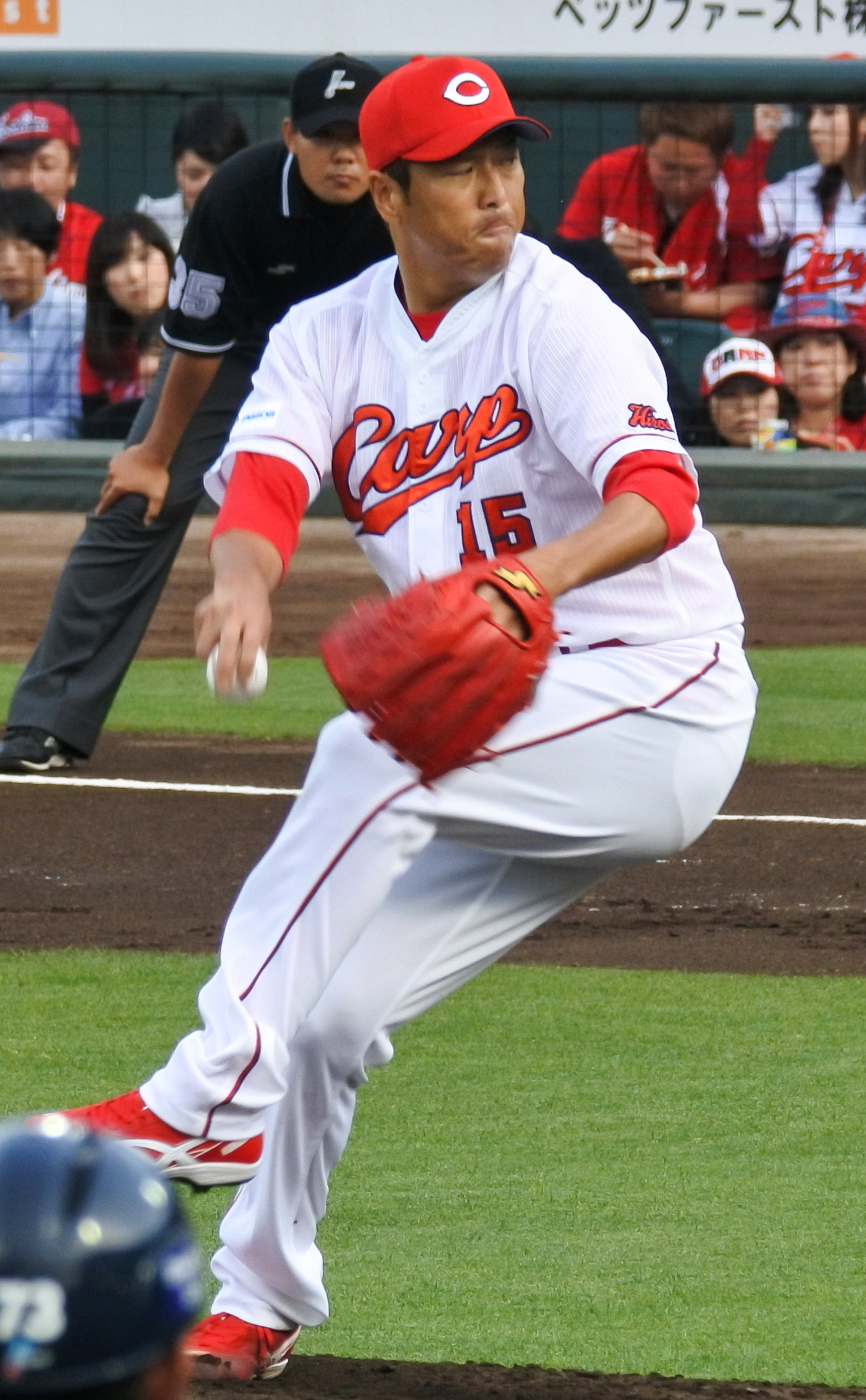
- Kuroda with the Hiroshima Toyo Carp
- Pitcher
- Born: February 10, 1975 (age 51); Osaka, Japan
- Batted: Right Threw: Right

Professional debut
- NPB: April 25, 1997, for the Hiroshima Toyo Carp
- MLB: April 4, 2008, for the Los Angeles Dodgers

Last appearance
- MLB: September 25, 2014, for the New York Yankees
- NPB: 2016, for the Hiroshima Toyo Carp

NPB statistics
- Win–loss record: 124–105
- Earned run average: 3.55
- Strikeouts: 1,461

MLB statistics
- Win–loss record: 79–79
- Earned run average: 3.45
- Strikeouts: 986
- Stats at Baseball Reference

Teams
- Hiroshima Toyo Carp (1997–2007); Los Angeles Dodgers (2008–2011); New York Yankees (2012–2014); Hiroshima Toyo Carp (2015–2016)

Career highlights and awards
- 5× NPB All-Star (2001, 2005–2007, 2015); Best Nine Award (2005); Golden Glove Award (2005); Hiroshima Toyo Carp No. 15 retired

Member of the Japanese

Baseball Hall of Fame
- Induction: 2024

Hiroki Kuroda
Medal record

Men's baseball

Representing Japan

Olympic Games
Bronze medal – third place	2004 Athens	Team

Hiroki Kuroda (黒田 博樹, Kuroda Hiroki; born February 10, 1975) is a Japanese former professional baseball pitcher. He pitched in Nippon Professional Baseball (NPB) for Hiroshima Toyo Carp from 1997 to 2007 before playing in Major League Baseball (MLB) for the Los Angeles Dodgers from 2008 to 2011 and New York Yankees from 2012 to 2014. After the 2014 season, he chose to return to the Carp to finish out his career. Between the two leagues, he won 203 games.

In NPB, Kuroda won the Best Nine Award in 2005 and was NPB ERA Champion in 2006. He also won a bronze medal at the 2004 Summer Olympics with the Japanese national baseball team.

Kuroda was appointed UNITAR Goodwill Ambassador on 14 September 2015. In 2024, he was inducted into the Japanese Baseball Hall of Fame.

== Early days ==
Kuroda was born and lived in Osaka (Suminoe-ku, Osaka-shi, Osaka-fu). His father, Kazuhiro Kuroda, was also a professional baseball player who played for the Nankai Hawks. He attended Uenomiya High School in Osaka, where he would attend classes and practices from 5 am until 10 pm. He then attended Senshu University in Tokyo.

== Playing career ==
=== Nippon Professional Baseball ===
He joined the Hiroshima Toyo Carp in 1996 as a second-round draft pick. During his early career, he was overshadowed by the 1996 first-round draft pick, Toshikazu Sawazaki, who was the same age as Kuroda and won the Japanese Rookie of the Year award in 1997. However, Kuroda gradually built up his status to become a consistent part of the starting rotation while Sawazaki began to fade away. In 1999 he pitched in the International Cup held in Sydney, and marked a win against Korea and a complete-game shutout against Taiwan.

Kuroda won over 10 games for three consecutive years from 2001. In 2003, he became the opening-day starter, taking over for former ace Shinji Sasaoka. He pitched poorly at the beginning of the season, but improved after the all-star break to end the season with 13 wins. He marked two wins as a reliever in the 2004 Summer Olympics, contributing to the Japanese team's bronze medal. In 2005, he led the Central League with 15 wins, and won the Best Nine Award and the Golden Glove. He continued his success in 2006, ending the season with a league-leading 1.85 ERA to solidify his reputation as one of the best pitchers in Japan. The last Japanese starter to end the season with an ERA below 2.00 was Masaki Saito in 1989. He also made his first save that year on October 16 against the Chunichi Dragons, and led the league in complete games over a six-year period from 1999 to 2005.

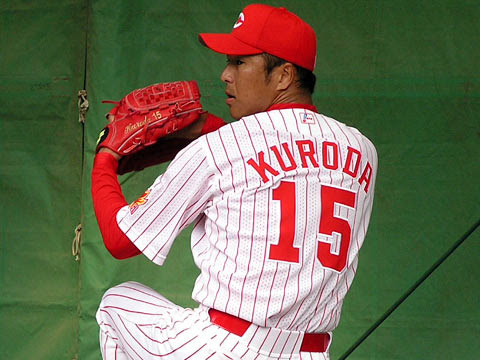
Kuroda's first stint with the Hiroshima Toyo Carp

In 2006, he was one of two players from the Hiroshima Toyo Carp selected to play in the 2006 World Baseball Classic, along with Takahiro Arai. He was touted as one of the obscure but key players on the Japanese team along with, then current, MLB players Akinori Iwamura and Kosuke Fukudome, but was injured getting hit by a baseball off the bat to the right hand during a practice game on February 24, forcing him to withdraw from the competition.

Kuroda became a free agent as early as May 2006, but announced that he would remain with the Carp for the 2007 season. During the off-season, he traveled to the United States to receive cleaning surgery in his right elbow at the suggestion of manager Marty Brown.

Kuroda pitched as the team's opening-day starter for the fifth consecutive year in 2007. He marked his 100th career win on July 14, 2007, against the Yomiuri Giants at the Tokyo Dome (his first professional win was also at the Tokyo Dome). Though Kuroda had been most effective during the summer in past years, he struggled to make quality starts during the later half of the season, perhaps due to the surgery he had received during the off-season. He ended the season with a 12–8 record, with a 3.56 ERA.

Along with Shinobu Fukuhara, Daisuke Miura, and Shingo Ono, Kuroda was known for receiving very poor run support in Japan. In 2005, he was the starter for a 12 inning pitching relay in a game that ended in a scoreless tie (April 15 against the Yokohama BayStars; the opposing starter was Daisuke Miura). In 2006 against the Hanshin Tigers, he left the game with a 2–1 lead after pitching 8 innings, but failed to get the win when closer Katsuhiro Nagakawa let up a tying home run with two outs in the 9th inning. He was also recognized as a "Giants Killer", as he seemed to pitch exceptionally well against the Yomiuri Giants.

=== Free agency ===
Kuroda obtained free agency on May 31, 2006, and announced that he was willing to hear offers from other teams. The Hiroshima Toyo Carp had a staunch policy against free agency because it would lead to higher salaries which the team would not be able to provide due to lack of financial structure. The team's management traditionally never attempted to re-negotiate with players of their own team who declared free agency (for example, the team ignored outfielder Tomoaki Kanemoto's offers to reconsider staying on the team because he had already declared free agency). Numerous teams showed interest in Kuroda, including the Seibu Lions and Hanshin Tigers, who had lost their key starters Daisuke Matsuzaka and Kei Igawa to the posting system. The well-financed Fukuoka SoftBank Hawks aggressively pursued Kuroda, while the Chunichi Dragons and Yomiuri Giants, who had been in pursuit of free agent Michihiro Ogasawara, were also thought to have interest.

Despite the team's anti-free agent policy, the Carp was facing serious problems with its weak pitching staff, which had kept them in the bottom half of the standings since 1997. The prospect of losing Kuroda, by far the most effective and consistent pitcher on the team, forced them into negotiations. On October 15, 2006, the team offered a 4-year, 1 billion yen deal with post-retirement benefits, showing that they were absolutely intent on retaining Kuroda. In terms of base salary, Kuroda had been paid 200 million yen in 2006, and this contract would only give a 50 million yen increase for 2007, with no further increases over the next three years. However, this was a major step-up for the Carp management considering that only two other players on the team (Tomonori Maeda and Tomoaki Kanemoto) had ever been paid more than 200 million yen per year. On November 6, 2006, Kuroda agreed to a 4-year 1.2 billion yen deal (250 million yen base salary+bonuses) to remain in Hiroshima. This new contract included a provision that Kuroda would be able to negotiate with major league teams as a free agent at any point during the 4-year deal. At the same time, Kuroda announced that he would play for no other Japanese teams besides the Hiroshima Toyo Carp. Although the deal ultimately concluded with a salary increase, Kuroda's negotiations showed a rare instance where free agency did not inflate salaries to ridiculous amounts.

Kuroda's response was received favorably by both the fans and the media, and in Kuroda's final start of the season, fans filled Hiroshima Municipal Stadium, old holding red cardboard cutouts of the number 15 (Kuroda's jersey number). However, Kuroda had repeatedly expressed a desire to win a championship, and there was a high possibility that he would leave for the major leagues if the team continued to play poorly. The team ended up struggling to escape from last place in the league throughout the season; far removed from the third-place finish that would have enabled the team to participate in the newly created Climax Series playoffs.

Kuroda declared his intention to play in the major leagues next season on October 18, 2007. It was briefly rumored that he would use the posting system to move to the major leagues, giving the poorly financed Hiroshima team some monetary benefits from the process, but he ended up declaring free agency, which enabled him to negotiate freely with any of the major league teams. The Texas Rangers, Seattle Mariners, Kansas City Royals, Arizona Diamondbacks, and Los Angeles Dodgers showed varying degrees of interest in signing Kuroda, and he signed a three-year, $35.3 million contract with the Los Angeles Dodgers on December 12, 2007.

=== Los Angeles Dodgers ===
In his first start for the Dodgers, Kuroda pitched seven innings against the San Diego Padres, holding them to 1 run and getting the first win of his American baseball career. Kuroda went 3–6 with an ERA of 4.04 before going on the DL with mild tendinitis.

Upon his return, he pitched seven shutout innings against the Houston Astros. However, his next start was even more impressive. On July 7, 2008, Kuroda pitched seven perfect innings in a game against the Atlanta Braves before allowing a double to Matt Stairs to lead off the eighth inning. Despite the double, he shutout the Braves on one hit with no walks over nine innings, Teixeira was the only baserunner Kuroda would allow in a 91-pitch complete game one-hit shutout. He became the first Dodger to throw a one-hitter since Derek Lowe threw one against the Chicago Cubs on August 31, 2005. He became the first rookie pitcher since Orel Hershiser in 1984 to take a perfect game into the eighth inning.

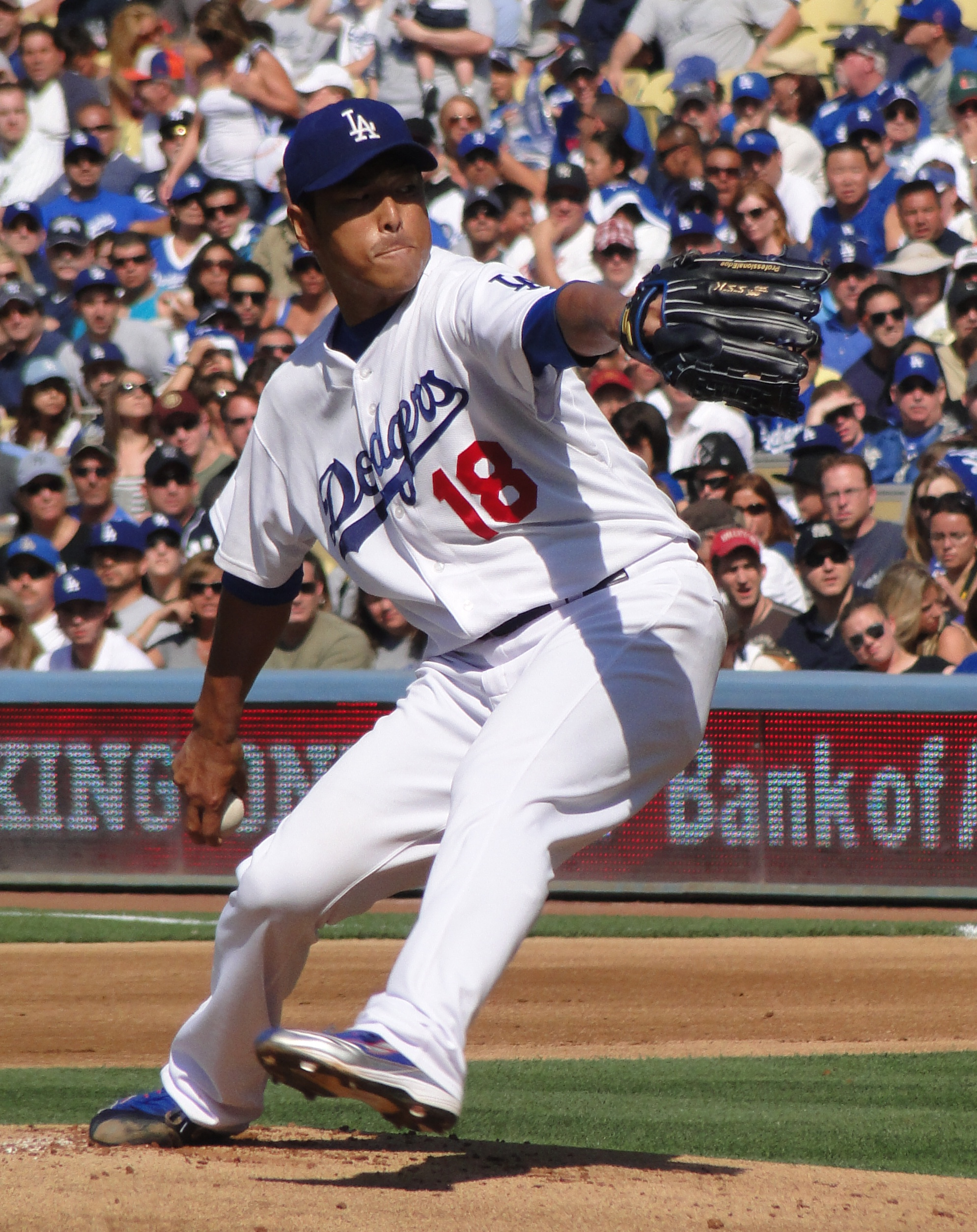
Kuroda pitching for the Los Angeles Dodgers in 2010

On September 15, 2008, Kuroda was deprived of the opportunity to become the first Dodgers pitcher since Hideo Nomo to throw 3 complete game shutouts in a single season. After pitching 7 innings in which he allowed only 3 hits and no walks, Kuroda was taken out of the game, with an 8–0 lead, so that the Dodgers could give Brad Penny and Takashi Saito some live practice. The Dodgers would go on to win that game 8–2.

On October 4, 2008, Kuroda made his first postseason appearance in the major leagues as the starting pitcher for Game 3 of the Dodgers' first playoff series against the Chicago Cubs, in which the Dodgers led two games to none. He gave a remarkable 6 1/3 shutout inning performance, winning the game and helping the Dodgers complete the sweep of the Cubs to advance to the next round National League Championship Series. On October 12, 2008, Kuroda started Game 3 against the Philadelphia Phillies in the 2008 NLCS with the Dodgers down two games to none. He pitched effectively again, giving up two runs in six innings (plus three batters faced in the seventh inning), and went on to notch his second postseason victory.

Kuroda was named the Dodgers opening day starter in 2009 and picked up the win, allowing only one run in six innings. However, he suffered an injury during a bullpen session soon afterwards and did not rejoin the rotation until June 1.

On August 15, 2009, while pitching in the bottom of the 6th inning against the Arizona Diamondbacks, Kuroda was hit on the side of his head by a line drive off the bat of Rusty Ryal. He had to be taken off the field on a stretcher and spent the night at the hospital. A CT scan was negative and he was released the next morning.

Despite missing much of the season while battling numerous injuries, Kuroda made 20 starts in 2009 and finished with an 8–7 record and 3.76 ERA. He was named the Game 3 starter in the NLCS against the Phillies even though he had missed the first round of the playoffs with a "bulging disk in his neck". However, he pitched poorly in the NLCS, failing to get out of the second inning and allowing six runs to score.

On August 30, 2010, Kuroda took a no-hitter into the 8th inning against the visiting Phillies; with one out, Matt Stairs broke up the Dodger hurler's "no-no" with a line drive single to right field. Kuroda received a standing ovation from the home crowd.

In 2010, Kuroda made 31 starts for the Dodgers, finishing the season with an 11–13 record and 3.39 ERA. He had a career best 196.1 innings pitched and 159 strikeouts. He became a free agent at the conclusion of the season, but was re-signed by the Dodgers to a one-year $12 million contract.

On July 27, 2011, Kuroda lost to the Colorado Rockies 1–3, becoming the first Dodger starting pitcher to have two consecutive seasons of at least 13 losses since Orel Hershiser in 1992 and 1993.

There was speculation that Kuroda would be traded at the trading deadline in 2011, but he chose not to waive the "no-trade clause" in his contract because he wanted to remain with the Dodgers for the rest of the season.

Kuroda finished the 2011 season with a 13–16 record, posting career highs in both wins and losses. His final ERA was 3.07, the best of his career and he struck out 161 batters on the season. He became a free agent at the end of the season.

=== New York Yankees ===
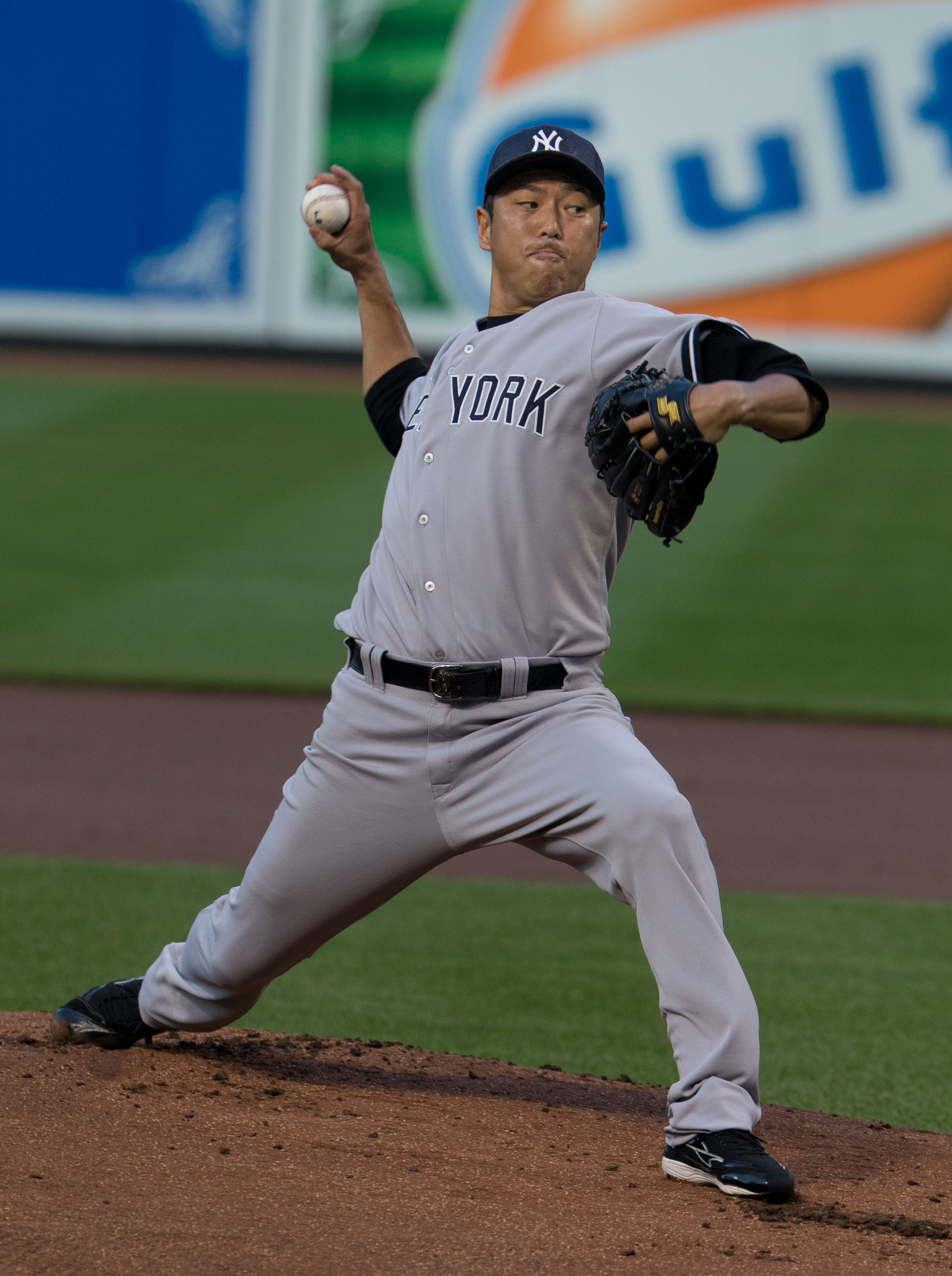
Kuroda with the New York Yankees in 2013

On January 13, 2012, Kuroda agreed to a one-year, $10 million contract with the New York Yankees. He was added to the Yankees roster on January 26, 2012.

After a successful first year with the Yankees which featured a 16–11 record with a 3.32 ERA in 219.2 regular season in IP and a 2.81 ERA in 16 post-season innings, the Yankees re-signed Kuroda to a 1-year deal worth $15 million on November 20, 2012. At the end of the 1st half in 2013, Kuroda led the AL in earned run average with 2.65. After the All-Star Break, Kuroda's velocity began to weaken as he went 3–7 with a 4.25 ERA in 13 starts. Overall in 2013, Kuroda went 11–13 with a 3.31 ERA in 32 starts. The next year he would go on to finish 11–9 with an ERA of 3.71 in 32 starts. Following the 2014 season, he would return to Japan – Kuroda would never post an ERA higher than 3.76 in his MLB career.

=== Return to Japan ===
On December 26, 2014, it was reported that Kuroda had decided to return to Japan for the 2015 season and would sign with his old team, the Hiroshima Toyo Carp, on a one-year $3.3 million contract.

Upon rejoining the Carp at age 40 after seven seasons in the MLB, Kuroda recorded one of his finer seasons as a professional. Despite an 11–8 record, Kuroda made 26 starts (topped only three times in his 12 other NPB season), recorded a 2.55 ERA (a full 1.04 below his NPB average), and finished with a 1.102 WHIP (topped only twice). By allowing just 8 home runs all season, Kuroda's HR/9 of 0.4 was easily a career best. Kuroda was named the Central League starting pitcher in the 2015 All-Star Game, his fifth overall selection. His opponent on the mound representing the Pacific League, Shohei Ohtani, was 19 years Kuroda's junior (40 and 21).

After some deliberation, Kuroda signed a contract to return to the Carp in 2016. The contract is worth a reported $4.9 million, making Kuroda the NPB's highest-paid player at age 41. Kuroda had a 10–8 record and a 3.09 ERA in 2016. Hiroshima reached the 2016 Japan Series. Kuroda announced that he would retire following the series' conclusion.

== Pitching style ==
Kuroda threw a mix of five pitches. His lead pitch was a shuuto—similar to a sinker and labeled as such by PITCHf/x—which he threw between 90 and 94 mph. Kuroda's shuuto topped out at 97 mph when he pitched for the Los Angeles Dodgers. Although Kuroda's shuuto velocity declined in his later career, the pitch still made him an effective ground-ball pitcher. His main off-speed pitch was a slider in the 83–85 range. Kuroda rounded out his repertoire with a four-seam fastball (90–94), a splitter (86–88), and an occasional curveball (76–78). Nearly 90% of the pitches Kuroda threw to right-handed batters were shuutos or sliders, split about evenly. Against lefties, he added considerable variety and drew on his splitter as a strikeout pitch. Kuroda was prone to leave a slider low and away against righties in two-strike counts.

== Family ==
Kuroda and his wife, Masayo, have two daughters, Hinatsu Kuroda (born November 18, 2002) and Wakana Kuroda (born August 13, 2005).

Preceded by Brad Penny	Los Angeles Dodgers Opening Day; Starting pitcher 2009	Succeeded by Vicente Padilla
