= Ramón Martínez (pitcher) =

Dominican baseball player (born 1968)

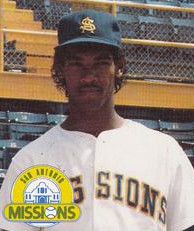
- Martínez in 1988
- Pitcher
- Born: March 22, 1968 (age 58); Santo Domingo, Dominican Republic
- Batted: Switch Threw: Right

MLB debut
- August 13, 1988, for the Los Angeles Dodgers

Last MLB appearance
- May 1, 2001, for the Pittsburgh Pirates

MLB statistics
- Win–loss record: 135–88
- Earned run average: 3.67
- Strikeouts: 1,427
- Stats at Baseball Reference

Teams
- Los Angeles Dodgers (1988–1998); Boston Red Sox (1999–2000); Pittsburgh Pirates (2001)

Career highlights and awards
- All-Star (1990); Pitched no-hitter on July 14, 1995

Ramón Jaime Martínez (born March 22, 1968) is a Dominican-American former professional baseball pitcher. He played in Major League Baseball (MLB) for the Los Angeles Dodgers, Boston Red Sox, and Pittsburgh Pirates. He won 135 games over a 13-year career, mostly with the Dodgers. He is the older brother of Hall of Fame pitcher Pedro Martínez, and is currently a senior advisor in Latin America for the Baltimore Orioles.

== Baseball career ==
=== Los Angeles Dodgers ===
Martínez was signed by the Los Angeles Dodgers as an amateur free agent on September 1, 1984, and was the youngest player in the National League when he made his major league debut on August 13, 1988, against the San Francisco Giants. He allowed only one run on four hits in 7 2/3 innings in a game the Dodgers eventually won in 11 innings. He got his first career win on August 29 against the Montreal Expos. The Dodgers won the World Series in October, and Martinez received a World Series ring.

He had a breakout season in 1990, when he won 20 games, struck out 18 batters in a game (on June 4), was selected an All-Star, led the major leagues with 12 complete games, and finished second in strikeouts as well as in the Cy Young Award balloting. He remained a solid pitcher for several years, winning 17 games in 1991 and 1995. On July 14 of the latter year, Martínez no-hit the Florida Marlins 7-0 at Dodger Stadium. In his no-hitter, the only thing that kept him from a perfect game was a walk to Tommy Gregg with two outs in the 8th inning.

Early in the 1998 season, Martínez suffered a torn rotator cuff and torn cartilage, which was surgically repaired on June 30. The Dodgers did not pick up a $5.6 million option after 1998 and he signed with the Boston Red Sox.

In 11 seasons with the Dodgers, he was 123–77 with a 3.45 ERA and 1,314 strikeouts, and was the team's opening day starter five times.

=== Later career ===
Martínez started the 1999 season in the minor leagues for rehabilitation. He was called up by the Red Sox in August, to pitch again alongside brother Pedro, making four starts for a 3–1 record with an ERA of 3.05. Martínez was less successful in 2000, with a record of 10–8 and a 6.03 ERA, and his option for 2001 was not picked up by the Red Sox.

After his two years with the Red Sox, he signed again with the Dodgers, but they released him at the end of spring training. He played briefly with the Pittsburgh Pirates in 2001 before retiring.

== Family ==
Ramón has three brothers, Pedro, Nelson, and Jesus.

While he was a starter for the Dodgers, Martínez repeatedly asserted that Pedro was an even better pitcher than he was. Nevertheless, Dodgers management thought Pedro was too small to be successful and traded him away. Pedro went on to win three Cy Young Awards with the Expos and Red Sox, and was a first-ballot inductee to the Hall of Fame in 2015. Martínez and Pedro were eventually reunited as teammates during Martínez's two years with the Red Sox.

His youngest brother, Jesus, also played professional baseball in the Dodgers farm system. He was briefly called up to the majors in September 1996, but never got into a game.

== See also ==
- List of Major League Baseball single-game strikeout leaders
- List of Major League Baseball no-hitters

Sporting positions
Preceded by Tim Belcher; Orel Hershiser	Los Angeles Dodgers Opening Day; Starting pitcher 1992; 1995–1998	Succeeded by Orel Hershiser; Kevin Brown
Preceded by Kenny Rogers	No-hitter pitcher July 14, 1995	Succeeded by Al Leiter
