= Vicente Padilla =

Nicaraguan baseball player (born 1977)

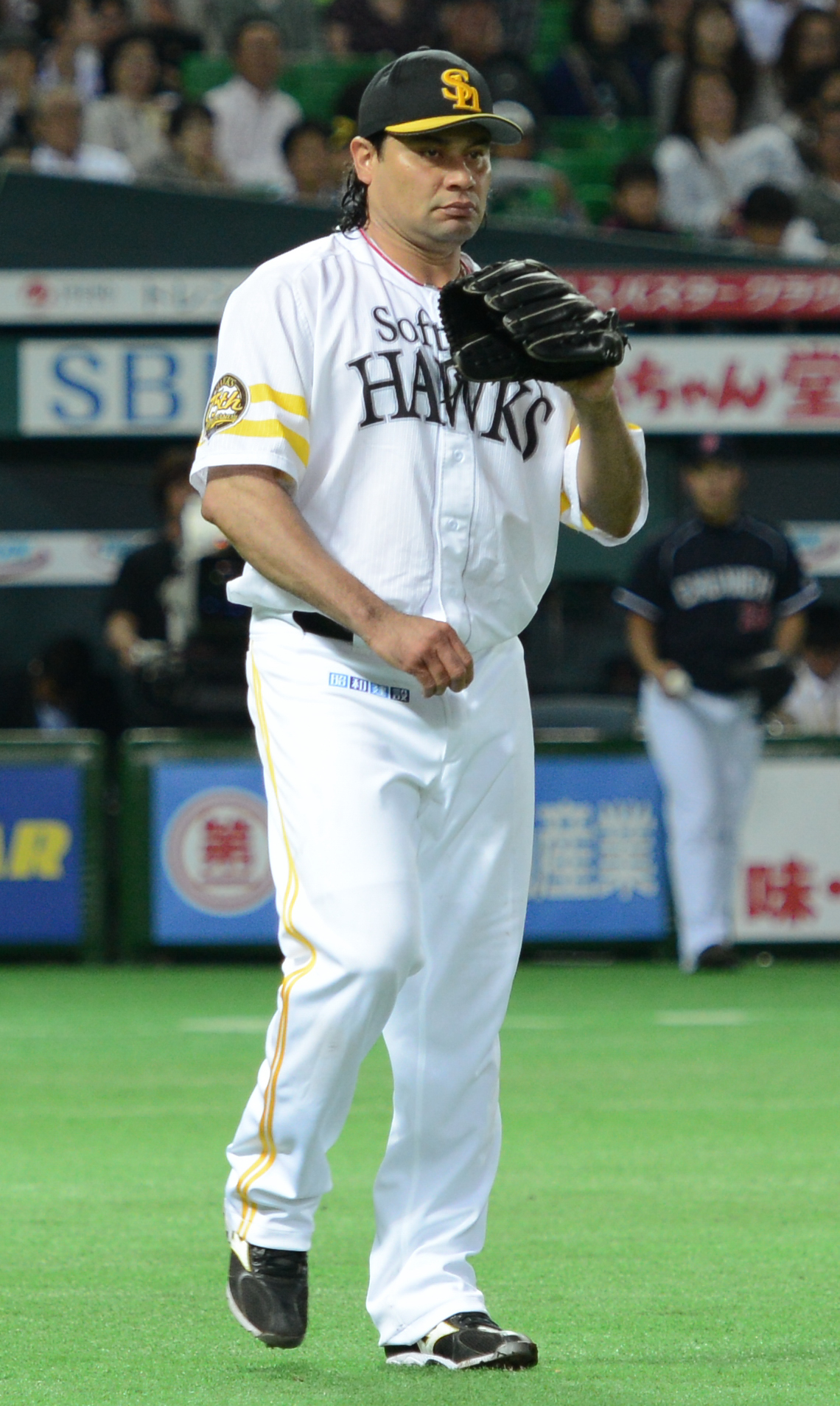
- Padilla with the Fukuoka SoftBank Hawks
- Pitcher
- Born: September 27, 1977 (age 48); Chinandega, Nicaragua
- Batted: Right Threw: Right

Professional debut
- MLB: June 29, 1999, for the Arizona Diamondbacks
- NPB: April 4, 2013, for the Fukuoka SoftBank Hawks

Last appearance
- MLB: October 2, 2012, for the Boston Red Sox
- NPB: August 9, 2013, for the Fukuoka SoftBank Hawks

MLB statistics
- Win–loss record: 108–91
- Earned run average: 4.32
- Strikeouts: 1,121

NPB statistics
- Win–loss record: 3–6
- Earned run average: 3.84
- Strikeouts: 40
- Stats at Baseball Reference

Teams
- Arizona Diamondbacks (1999–2000); Philadelphia Phillies (2000–2005); Texas Rangers (2006–2009); Los Angeles Dodgers (2009–2011); Boston Red Sox (2012); Fukuoka SoftBank Hawks (2013)

Career highlights and awards
- All Star (2002)
Medals
Men's baseball
Representing Nicaragua
Central American and Caribbean Games
Silver medal – second place	1998 Maracaibo	Team

Vicente de la Cruz Padilla (born September 27, 1977) is a Nicaraguan former professional baseball pitcher. Padilla played in Major League Baseball (MLB) for the Arizona Diamondbacks, Philadelphia Phillies, Texas Rangers, Los Angeles Dodgers and Boston Red Sox and in Nippon Professional Baseball (NPB) for the Fukuoka SoftBank Hawks.

== Baseball career ==
=== International competition ===
Padilla pitched for Nicaragua in the 1998 Baseball World Cup, helping his team win the Bronze medal as the closer. He also appeared in the Central American Games the same year, as his team finished in second place.

=== Arizona Diamondbacks ===
After working with former MLB pitcher Dennis Martínez to improve his change-up, Padilla was signed as an international free agent by the Arizona Diamondbacks on August 31, 1998. He debuted in the minor leagues in 1999, playing for the Class-A Advanced High Desert Mavericks and earning a promotion to the Class-AAA Tucson Sidewinders.

Padilla made his Major League debut on June 29 against the Cincinnati Reds, pitching in the ninth inning and giving up four hits and three runs without recording an out, getting the loss and a blown save for the effort. Padilla appeared in four more games in 1999. He also appeared in 27 games in relief for the Diamondbacks in 2000, finishing 2–1 with a 2.31 ERA, with his first win coming on May 9 against the Los Angeles Dodgers.

=== Philadelphia Phillies ===
On July 26, 2000, Padilla was traded from the Diamondbacks to the Philadelphia Phillies along with three other players (Travis Lee, Nelson Figueroa and Omar Daal) for pitcher Curt Schilling.

He was moved to the starting rotation in 2002 and made his first start on April 3 against the Atlanta Braves, working six innings and picking up the win. He finished the season 14–11 with a 3.28 ERA in 32 starts and was selected to appear in the All-Star Game.

He battled injuries during the 2004 and 2005 seasons, posting a combined win–loss record of 16–19.

After posting a 4.71 ERA and a 1.50 WHIP during the 2005 season, Padilla was traded to the Texas Rangers for Ricardo Rodríguez.

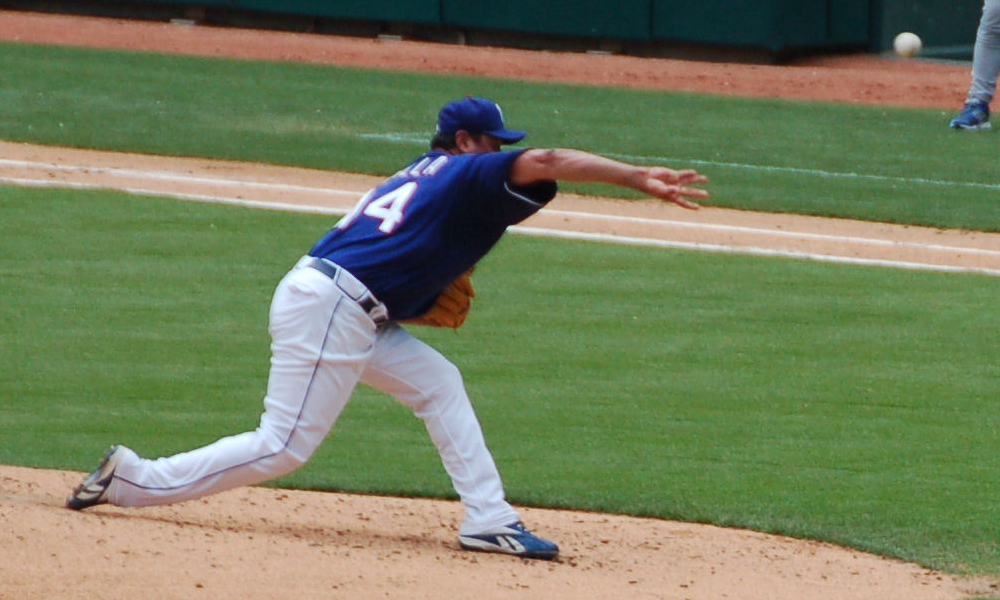
Padilla pitching for the Texas Rangers in 2007.

=== Texas Rangers ===
During the 2006 season, he also came under fire for his "lack of control" on the mound. Padilla caused a controversy in Chicago when he twice hit White Sox catcher A. J. Pierzynski, and later in the season again caused a benches-clearing brawl against the Angels when he repeatedly threw at Angels batters, showing particular interest in slugger Vladimir Guerrero. On September 16, 2007, Padilla hit Oakland Athletics outfielder Nick Swisher after two pitches earlier in the plate appearances were inside that almost hit Swisher. Swisher then charged the mound starting a brawl and resulting in both players getting ejected. He also has history of hitting former teammate Mark Teixeira on June 6, 2009.

In 2006, he and Kevin Millwood won 15 games; a total not matched by a Rangers pitcher until Scott Feldman surpassed it in 2009.

His 11 road victories in 2008 matched a club record set by Rick Helling (1998), later surpassed by Scott Feldman (2009).

On July 22, 2009, Padilla tested positive for swine flu, and was believed to be the first major U.S. athlete to catch the disease.

On August 7, 2009, Padilla was designated for assignment by the Rangers after going 8–6 with a 4.92 ERA in 18 starts. Ten days later Padilla was given his release. He was released because he was "regarded as a disruptive clubhouse presence."

=== Los Angeles Dodgers ===
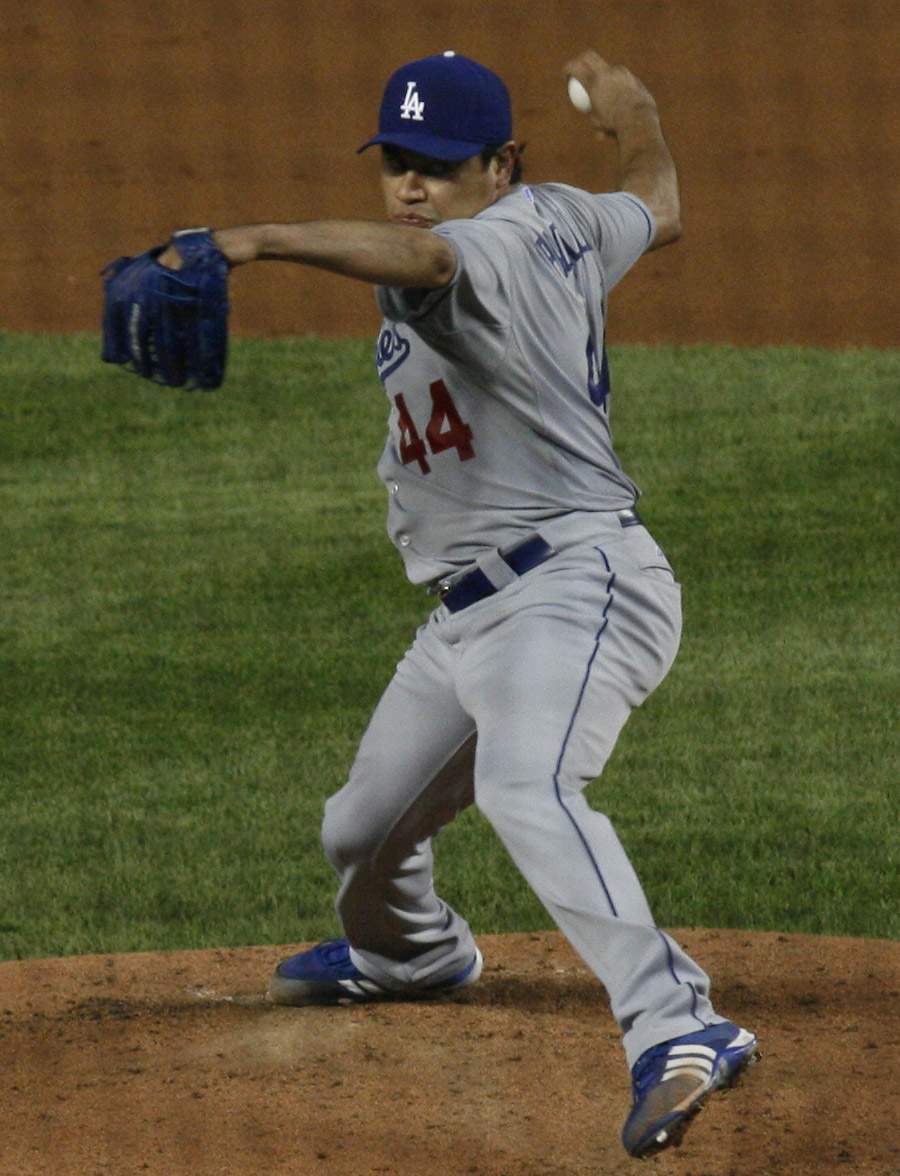
Padilla during his tenure with the Los Angeles Dodgers in 2009.

On August 19, 2009, Padilla signed a minor league contract with the Los Angeles Dodgers. He made one start with the AAA Albuquerque Isotopes and then was activated on August 27 to start for the Dodgers against the Colorado Rockies. He made seven starts for the Dodgers in August and September, finishing with a record of 4–0 and a 3.20 ERA.

On October 10, 2009, Padilla was the starting and winning pitcher in the clinching Game 3 of the National League Division Series against the St. Louis Cardinals, pitching seven scoreless innings. He also pitched well in Game 2 of the NLCS against the Philadelphia Phillies, working 7 1/3 innings and only allowing one run in a game the Dodgers eventually won. However, he picked up the loss, giving up six earned runs in three innings of work, in the deciding Game 5, allowing the Philadelphia Phillies to advance to the World Series for the second straight year.

On November 3, 2009, Padilla was injured when he was accidentally shot in the leg at a shooting range in Nicaragua. It was not a serious injury.

On January 21, 2010, Padilla re-signed with the Dodgers, a one-year, $5.025 million deal, with $1 million of that in the form of a signing bonus.

On March 25, 2010, the Dodgers announced that Padilla would be their opening day starter for the 2010 season. Due to a number of recurring injuries, Padilla only was able to start 16 games for the Dodgers in 2010, finishing 6–5 with a 4.31 ERA. His best performance was a complete-game shutout against the San Diego Padres on August 4. He made just three more starts after that before he was shut down for the season. After the season, Padilla re-signed with the Dodgers on a one-year, incentive-laden deal.

He was injured in spring training in 2011 and began the season on the disabled list, rejoining the team on April 23 as a reliever. In his new role, he picked up his first save since 2000 in a 10-inning game against the Florida Marlins on April 27. He became the Dodgers closer for a brief time after Jonathan Broxton was placed on the disabled list. However, he also wound up on the disabled list on May 14. He was first shut down with a forearm injury and later with neck problems, which required surgery. He was unable to return to the Dodgers in 2011, appearing in only nine games, pitching 8 2/3 innings with a 4.15 ERA and three saves. This was the fewest appearances for Padilla since his first season, and the first year he did not start any games since 2001 with the Phillies. He became a free agent following the season.

=== Boston Red Sox ===
On January 16, 2012, Padilla signed a minor league deal with the Boston Red Sox that included an invitation to spring training. He earned $1.5 million when he was promoted to major league level. Padilla made the 25-man roster and pitched out of the bullpen. He became a free agent following the season.

=== Fukuoka SoftBank Hawks ===
On January 16, 2013, Padilla signed a one-year deal with the Fukuoka SoftBank Hawks of the Nippon Professional Baseball League. He became a free agent following the season.

== Pitching style ==
Padilla threw a wide variety of pitches during his career: a fastball, a curveball, a sinker, a slider, a changeup, and an eephus pitch. The fastball was his main pitch; it reached speeds of 92–94 mph. However, he was also one of the few pitchers in baseball to throw an eephus pitch, a slow curve that travels about 55 mph. Padilla tended to hit a lot of batters: his total of 106 hit batters (HB) is 70th all-time, and he led the American League in hit batters in 2006.

== See also ==
- List of Major League Baseball career hit batsmen leaders

Preceded by Hiroki Kuroda	Los Angeles Dodgers Opening Day; Starting pitcher 2010	Succeeded by Clayton Kershaw
