= Brad Penny =

American baseball pitcher (born 1978)

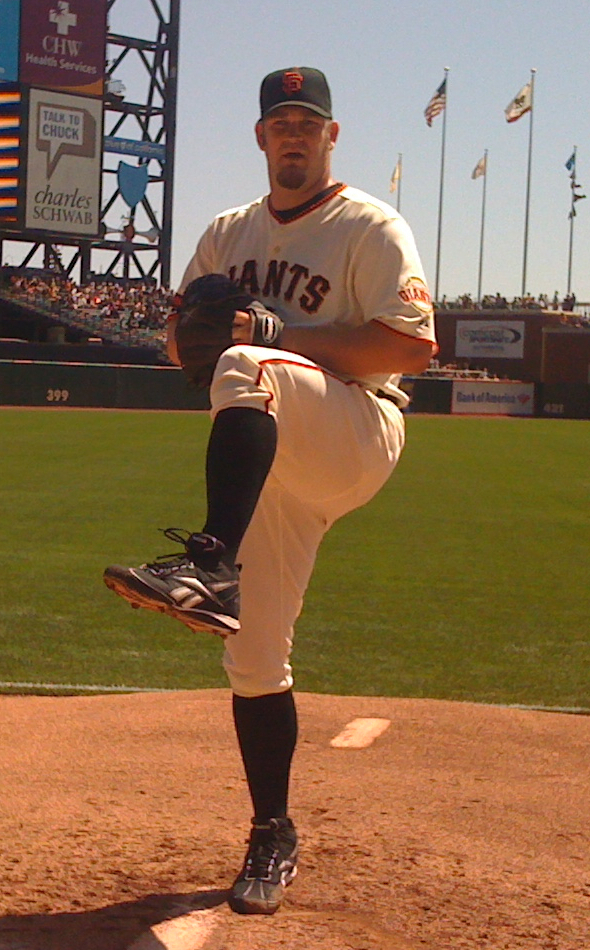
- Penny with the San Francisco Giants
- Pitcher
- Born: May 24, 1978 (age 48); Blackwell, Oklahoma, U.S.
- Batted: Right Threw: Right

Professional debut
- MLB: April 7, 2000, for the Florida Marlins
- NPB: April 4, 2012, for the Fukuoka SoftBank Hawks

Last appearance
- NPB: April 4, 2012, for the Fukuoka SoftBank Hawks
- MLB: September 26, 2014, for the Miami Marlins

MLB statistics
- Win–loss record: 121–101
- Earned run average: 4.29
- Strikeouts: 1,273

NPB statistics
- Win–loss record: 0–1
- Earned run average: 10.80
- Strikeouts: 1
- Stats at Baseball Reference

Teams
- Florida Marlins (2000–2004); Los Angeles Dodgers (2004–2008); Boston Red Sox (2009); San Francisco Giants (2009); St. Louis Cardinals (2010); Detroit Tigers (2011); Fukuoka SoftBank Hawks (2012); San Francisco Giants (2012); Miami Marlins (2014)

Career highlights and awards
- 2× All Star (2006, 2007); World Series champion (2003); NL wins leader (2006)
Medals
Men's baseball
Representing United States
Pan American Games
Silver medal – second place	1999 Winnipeg	Team

Bradley Wayne Penny (born May 24, 1978) is an American former professional baseball pitcher. Penny played in Major League Baseball (MLB) for the Florida / Miami Marlins, Los Angeles Dodgers, Boston Red Sox, San Francisco Giants, St. Louis Cardinals, and Detroit Tigers, and in Nippon Professional Baseball (NPB) for the Fukuoka SoftBank Hawks. He was an All Star in 2006 and 2007.

== Early life ==
Penny was born in Blackwell, Oklahoma. He graduated from Broken Arrow Senior High, where he was an All-State selection and Frontier Conference Pitcher of the Year.

== Professional career ==
=== Arizona Diamondbacks ===
==== Minor leagues ====
Penny was selected by the Arizona Diamondbacks in the fifth round (155th overall) of the 1996 MLB draft, and signed with the Diamondbacks on June 4, 1996.

He was immediately assigned to the Arizona Summer League, where he ranked fourth in the league in ERA (2.36) and was named Arizona's Organizational Pitcher of the Month in August. With the South Bend Silver Hawks in 1997, he was 10–5 with an ERA of 2.73 in 25 starts.

In 1998, with the High Desert Mavericks, he went 14–5 with a 2.96 ERA in 28 starts and was named to Baseball America's first team Minor League All-Stars, the California League Pitcher of the Year, California League Most Valuable Player, Arizona Diamondbacks Minor League Player of the Year and "A" Level Player of the Year.

In 1999, he started the year with the El Paso Diablos at the Diamondbacks Double-A level, and had a 2–7 record with a 4.80 ERA when he was traded to the Florida Marlins.

=== Florida Marlins ===
On July 8, 1999, Penny was traded to the Florida Marlins along with Abraham Núñez and Vladimir Núñez in exchange for relief pitcher Matt Mantei. The Marlins assigned him to their Double-A affiliate, the Portland Sea Dogs. In his first game in the Marlins organization on August 8, Penny combined with Luis Arroyo for the first no-hitter in Portland history.

==== Major leagues ====
After a good spring, Penny made the Marlins starting rotation in 2000. He made his first MLB appearance in a start on April 7, 2000, against the Colorado Rockies. Penny pitched seven innings, giving up only one run, to get his first MLB win in the Marlins' 4–3 victory. At the end of the season, he ranked second among NL rookies in winning percentage (.533), third in wins, tied for fourth with 22 games started and was sixth in both innings pitched (119 2/3) and strikeouts (80).

In 2001, Penny pitched 205 innings for the Marlins. He finished 10–10 in 31 starts. In 2002, due to injuries and ineffectiveness, Penny's ERA rose from 3.69 in 2001 to 4.66 in 2002.

In 2003, Penny bounced back, finishing the season with 14 wins for the Marlins and helping them reach the playoffs. Penny collected the win in Florida's NLCS clinching victory over the Chicago Cubs and in the World Series against the New York Yankees he went 2–0 with a 2.19 ERA in his two starts.

Penny started the 2004 season with an 8–8 record with a 3.15 ERA in 21 starts for the Marlins.

=== Los Angeles Dodgers ===
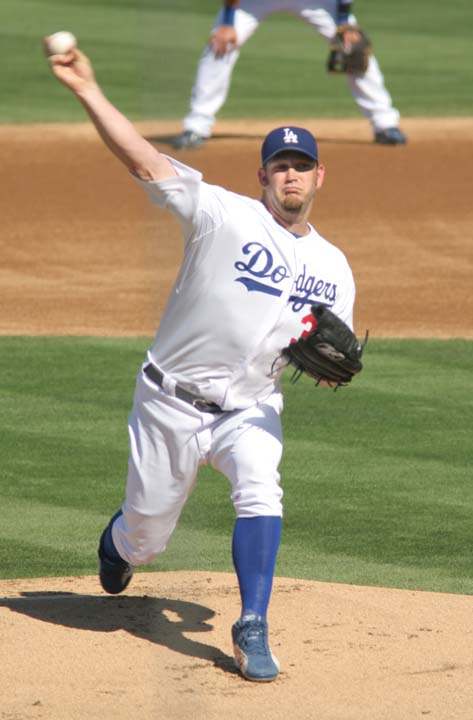
Penny pitching for the Los Angeles Dodgers during spring training action in Arizona, 2008

On July 30, 2004, Penny was traded with Hee-Seop Choi and pitching prospect Bill Murphy to the Los Angeles Dodgers for Guillermo Mota, Juan Encarnación, and Paul Lo Duca. However, in the first inning of his second start with the Dodgers he suffered a serious arm injury and went on the disabled list (DL). He returned in September but reinjured himself after three innings in his first start off the DL. He began the following season on the disabled list, still recovering from the injury, but he rejoined the Dodgers on April 24, 2005, and had a solid season.

On June 12, 2005, Penny signed a three-year contract extension worth a guaranteed $25 million and a team option for the 2009 season.

Penny was named by Houston Astros manager Phil Garner as the National League's starting pitcher in the 2006 All-Star Game. He pitched two innings, allowing a home run to Vladimir Guerrero after striking out the side (Ichiro Suzuki, Derek Jeter, and David Ortiz) in the first inning.

On September 23, 2006, against the Arizona Diamondbacks, Penny joined the small club of pitchers who have struck out four batters in one inning. Due to the uncaught third strike rule, Penny was credited with striking out Chad Tracy, but because catcher Russell Martin failed to catch the ball cleanly, Tracy was allowed to attempt to run to first base, and made it there before he could be thrown out. Despite giving up three runs in the inning, Penny recorded three more strikeouts to complete the four-strikeout inning.

He also threw the fastest fastball of all NL starters in 2006, averaging 93.9 miles per hour.

Penny had a strong start to 2007 that continued throughout the season, with an ERA of 3.03 for the season and was the first Dodger pitcher to start out with a 12–1 record since Phil Regan went 14–1 in 1966. Penny was selected to the All-Star game for a second consecutive year. Penny had several memorable outings in 2007, including on May 7, 2007, against his former team, the Florida Marlins. Penny struck out a career-high 14 batters that day in a 6–1 Dodger win. Another memorable performance was against the San Diego Padres in a pitcher's duel against All-Star teammate Jake Peavy just before the All-Star break. The match ended in a draw with both pitchers going seven innings giving up one earned run on five hits. Penny struck out seven, while Peavy struck out six. The Padres would eventually win the game 3–1 in 12 innings. He also threw the fastest fastball of all NL starters in 2007, averaging 93.4 miles per hour.

Besides being a hard throwing pitcher, Penny developed into a good hitting pitcher since being traded to the Dodgers. In 2006, his batting average was .185, but was above .200 for most of the season and was as high as .240 before Penny ended the year in an 0-for-12 slump. He batted .246 in 2007. Penny also had six doubles, seven RBI, and seven runs scored.

For the 2008 season, Penny was selected as opening day starter against the San Francisco Giants, shutting them out over seven innings, but he struggled in 2008 overall, going 6–9 with a 6.27 ERA and a stint on the DL. After coming back from the DL in September, Penny made a few appearances out of the bullpen but struggled in that role and returned to the DL. After the season, the Dodgers declined his option year, making Penny a free agent.

=== Boston Red Sox ===
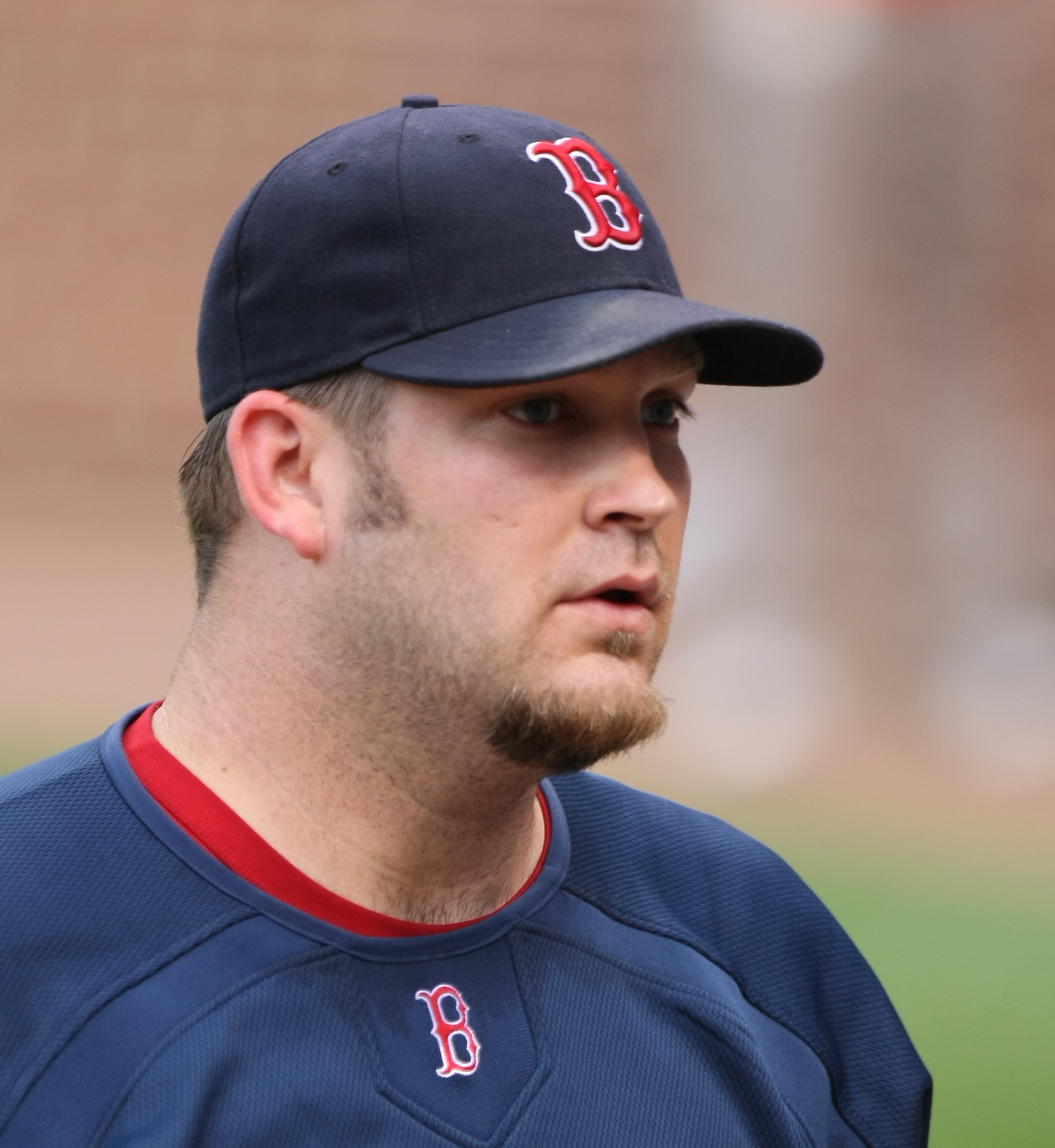
Penny during his tenure with the Boston Red Sox in 2009

On January 9, 2009, Penny signed a one-year deal with the Boston Red Sox with a base salary of $5M. Incentives and performance bonuses were included to increase the total deal another $3M.

Penny recorded his 100th career win on June 17, 2009, against his former team the Florida Marlins, in a five-inning effort only giving up one unearned run. The win came on the Red Sox's 500th consecutive sell out at Fenway Park.

During his last five starts with the Red Sox, Penny was 0–4 with a 9.11 ERA. After a disastrous start against the rival Yankees, Boston management decided on August 22 that Penny would leave the rotation, replaced by veteran knuckleballer Tim Wakefield, who was coming off the disabled list. During Wakefield's August 26 start, Penny was placed in the bullpen as insurance, but was never needed with Wakefield pitching a strong seven inning effort giving up only one run. With Wakefield completing a healthy start, reliever Billy Wagner being added to the roster, and Penny not wanting to be a reliever, the Red Sox granted his wish to be released late that night. During his time in Boston, Penny's record was 7–8, with a 5.61 ERA.

=== San Francisco Giants ===
On August 31, 2009, Penny signed with the San Francisco Giants after clearing waivers. The Giants paid Penny only the pro-rated portion of the $400,000 MLB minimum salary (i.e., under $100k), with the Red Sox paying the remainder of his $5 million salary for the year. In his debut, Penny pitched eight shutout innings in a 4–0 win over Philadelphia. Penny demonstrated his past success in the National League, going 4-1 in 6 starts for the Giants. He became a free agent after the season.

=== St. Louis Cardinals ===
On December 9, 2009, Penny agreed to a one-year contract with the St. Louis Cardinals. On May 21, 2010, Penny hit his first career grand slam, giving St. Louis an 8–4 lead during interleague play against the Angels. He was pulled the next inning with an injury and did not earn the win. The injury was an aggravation of a pre-existing oblique muscle strain that landed him on the disabled list for the remainder of the season. He became a free agent following the season

=== Detroit Tigers ===
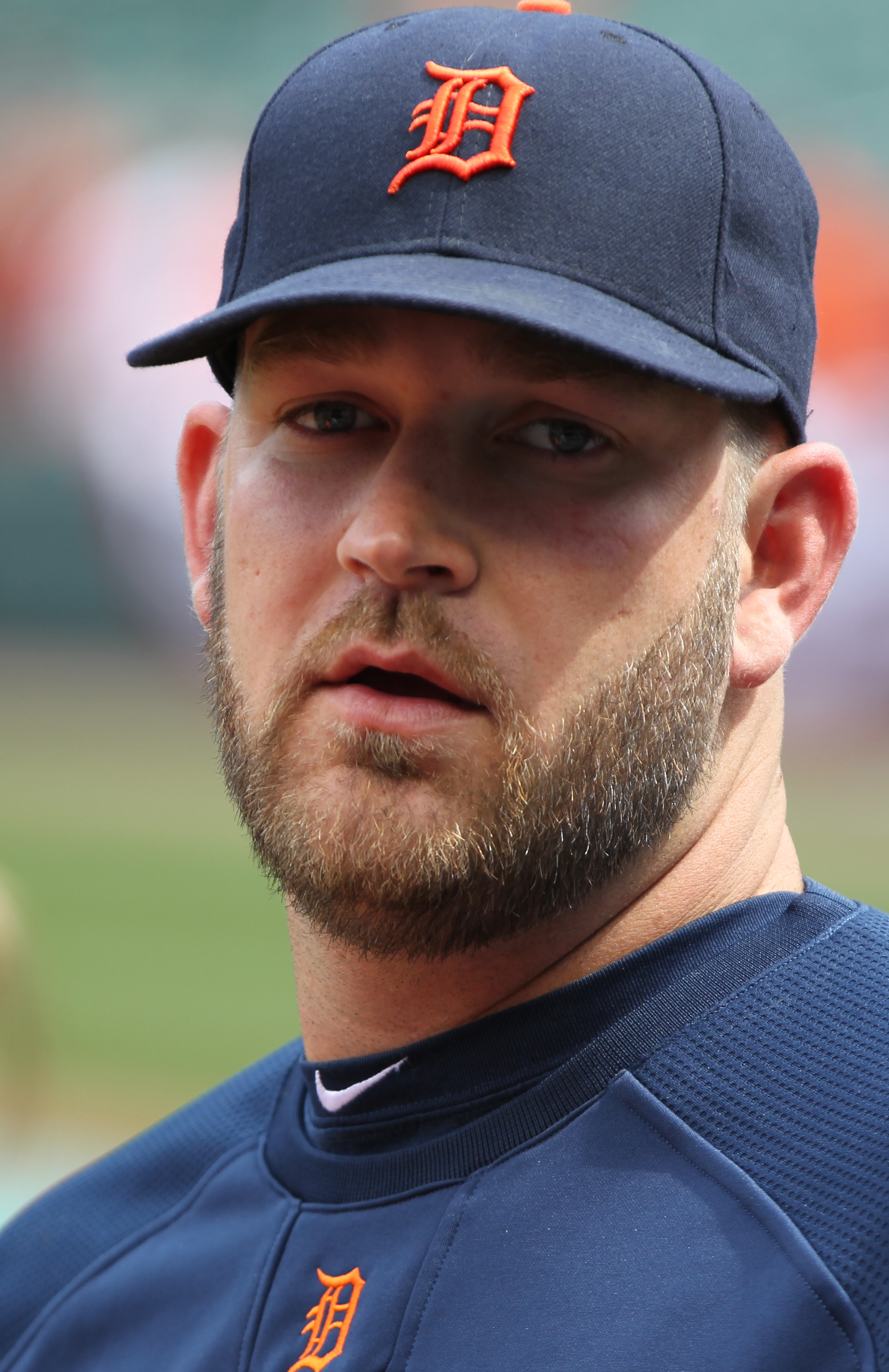
Penny with the Tigers in 2011

On January 18, 2011, Penny agreed to a one-year, $3 million contract with the Detroit Tigers. Joining the Tigers roster reunited Penny with past teammates in Miguel Cabrera from the Marlins and Víctor Martínez from the Red Sox.

Penny started off the season with the Tigers as their number two starter, behind Justin Verlander and in front of Max Scherzer. Aside from May, when Penny went 3–1 in five starts with an ERA of 3.24, Penny had a sub-par first half of the season, going 6–6 with a 4.50 ERA, and with the Tigers' acquisition of Doug Fister in July, in addition to the success of Scherzer, Penny was moved to the number four spot in the rotation. Penny had a worse second half, going 5–5 with a 6.53 ERA after the All-Star break. Overall, Penny's 5.30 ERA was the worst among qualified starters in 2011.

When the Tigers went to the postseason, he was added to the roster in the bullpen. He appeared in Game 6 of the American League Championship Series against the Texas Rangers, his only appearance in the playoffs, and pitched 1 2/3 innings while giving up 5 runs. The Tigers went on to lose that game 15–5, sending the Rangers to the World Series. The Rangers lost in 7 games to Penny's former club, the St. Louis Cardinals.

=== Fukuoka SoftBank Hawks ===
On February 5, 2012, Penny agreed to a one-year, $3 million contract with the Fukuoka SoftBank Hawks of Nippon Professional Baseball.

However, after allowing six runs and five stolen bases in only 3 1/3 innings in his NPB debut game, Penny claimed that he injured his elbow and asked to be removed from the game. He was immediately sent to the disabled list and took two MRI exams (one in Fukuoka, and one in the United States), but both results were negative. Penny was released from his contract a month later, on May 8. He was a "huge disappointment," and a local newspaper reported that signing Penny was "the worst decision in franchise history."

=== San Francisco Giants (second stint) ===
On May 18, 2012, Penny signed a minor league contract with the San Francisco Giants. He had his contract selected to the major league roster on June 29. On June 30, Penny faced the Cincinnati Reds in his first game of the season. He went 2 1/3 innings, giving up 0 hits and 0 earned runs while striking out 1 batter. He finished the season 0-1 with a 6.11 ERA while appearing in 22 games. He became a free agent following the season.

=== Miami Marlins ===
On January 16, 2014, Penny signed a minor league contract with the Kansas City Royals. He was released prior to the start of the season on March 7, after experiencing struggles in spring training.

On June 18, 2014, Penny agreed to a minor league contract with the Miami Marlins. He had his contract selected to the major league roster and he made his first start with the club in over ten years on August 9, against the Cincinnati Reds. He became a free agent following the season.

=== Chicago White Sox ===
On December 16, 2014, Penny signed a minor league deal with the Chicago White Sox. After a mixed spring training in 2015 (1–1 record with a 6.89 ERA in 15 2/3 innings), he failed to win a spot in Chicago's rotation and played with their Triple-A affiliate, the Charlotte Knights. He elected free agency on November 6, 2015.

On December 18, 2015, Penny signed a minor league contract with the Toronto Blue Jays that included an invitation to spring training. On March 18, 2016, Penny announced his retirement from professional baseball.

== Personal life ==
In October 2009, Penny began dating professional dancer Karina Smirnoff. They became engaged in October 2010, but ended the engagement in December 2011.

Penny subsequently began dating former Oklahoma City Thunder dancer Kaci Cook. They became engaged in January 2013, and married on August 1, 2013, in Hawaii.

== See also ==
- List of Major League Baseball annual wins leaders
- List of Major League Baseball single-inning strikeout leaders

Preceded by Derek Lowe	Los Angeles Dodgers Opening Day; Starting pitcher 2008	Succeeded by Hiroki Kuroda
Preceded by Chris Carpenter	National League All-Star Game Starting Pitcher; 2006	Succeeded by Jake Peavy
