= List of Los Angeles Dodgers Opening Day starting pitchers =

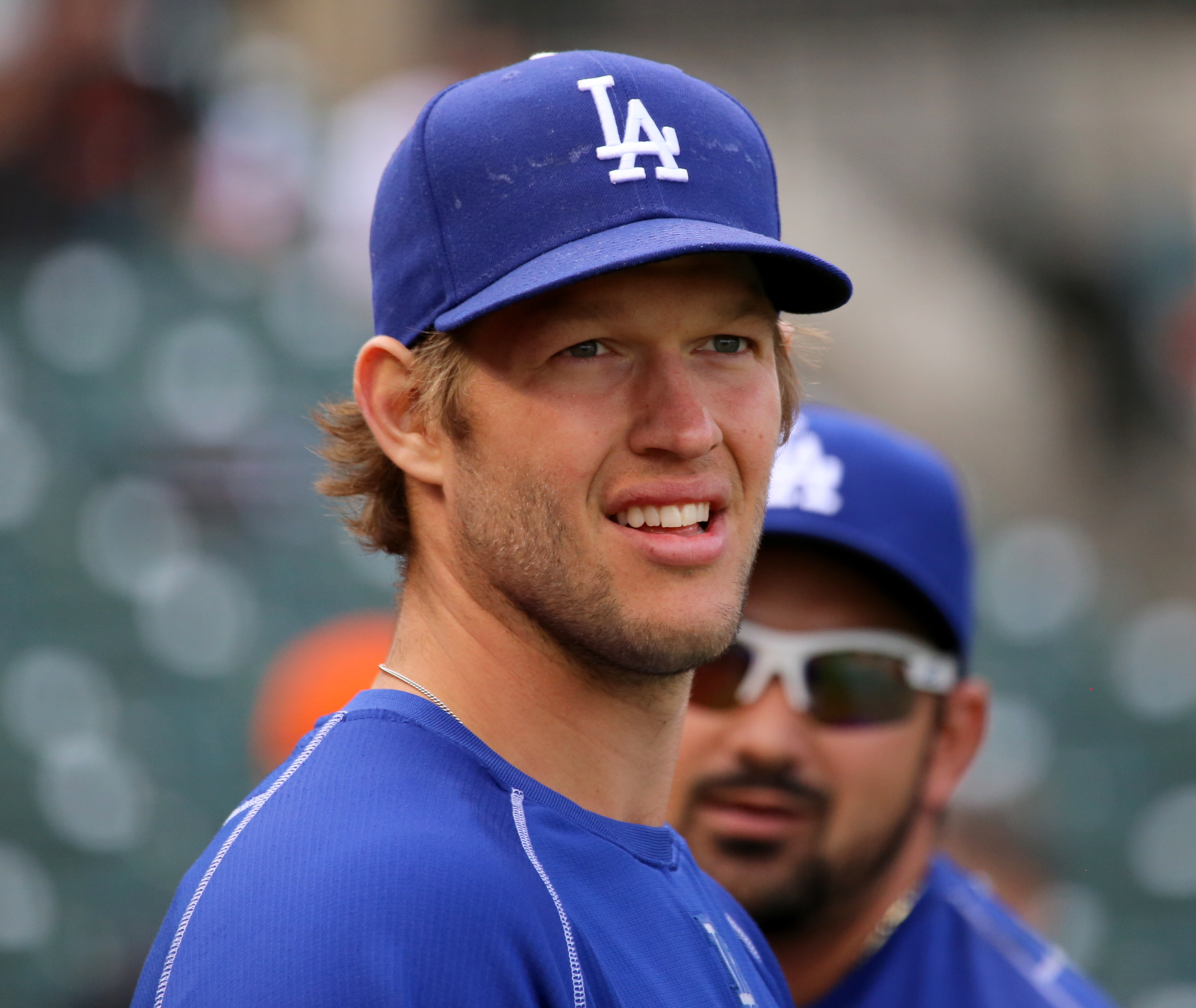
Clayton Kershaw holds the Dodgers' record for most Opening Day starts with nine (2011–2018 & 2021).

The Los Angeles Dodgers are a Major League Baseball (MLB) franchise based in Los Angeles. They play in the National League West division. The first game of the new baseball season for a team is played on Opening Day, and being named the Opening Day starter is an honor, which is often given to the player who is expected to lead the pitching staff that season, though there are various strategic reasons why a team's best pitcher might not start on Opening Day. The Dodgers have used 27 different Opening Day starting pitchers in their 68 seasons in Los Angeles. The 27 starters have a combined Opening Day record of 30 wins, 27 losses and 10 no decisions.

The Dodgers started playing in Los Angeles in 1958, after moving from Brooklyn. The first Opening Day game for the Dodgers in Los Angeles was played in San Francisco against the San Francisco Giants on April 15, 1958. California native Don Drysdale was the Dodgers' Opening Day starting pitcher that day, in a game the Dodgers lost 8–0. Dodgers starting pitchers won both of their Opening Day starts in their first home ballpark in Los Angeles, Los Angeles Memorial Coliseum.

Clayton Kershaw's nine Opening Day starts for the Dodgers from 2011 to 2018 and 2021 are the most ever by a Dodgers starter, two more than Don Drysdale and Don Sutton. Fernando Valenzuela, Ramón Martínez and Orel Hershiser have had at least four Opening Day starts, with six, five and four respectively. Hall of Famer Sandy Koufax, who won three Cy Young Awards during the 1960s, only made one Opening Day start for the Dodgers, in 1964. Drysdale and Kershaw are also tied for the Los Angeles Dodgers record for most wins as an Opening Day starter, with five wins. They both also have two losses.

Koufax (1964), Chan Ho Park (2001), Brad Penny (2008), Hiroki Kuroda (2009), Julio Urías (2023) and Yoshinobu Yamamoto (2025) are the only Los Angeles Dodgers Opening Day starting pitchers to have won all their Opening Day decisions, Martinez and Derek Lowe share the Los Angeles Dodgers record for most Opening Day losses, with three. The Los Angeles Dodgers won the World Series championship in 1959, 1963, 1965, 1981, 1988 and 2020, 2024 and 2025 World Series. Drysdale (1959, 1963 and 1965), Valenzuela (1981 and 1988), Dustin May (2020), Tyler Glasnow (2024) and Yoshinobu Yamamoto (2025) were the Dodgers' Opening Day starting pitchers those years. The 2024 Dodgers opened their season in Korea for the Seoul Series, and Glasnow was the starter for the Dodgers’ home opener in LA as well. The Dodgers' starting pitcher won the Opening Day game in 1963, 1965, 1981 and the home opener in 2024, but lost in 1959 and 1988. In 2020 and the 2024 season opener, the starter did not factor in the decision.

== Key ==
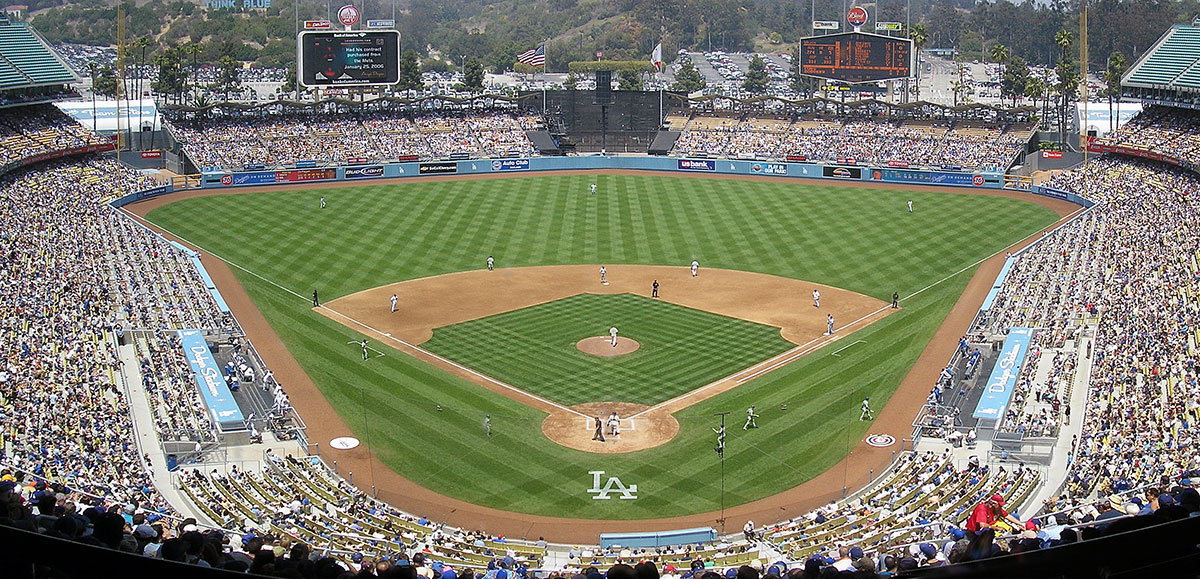
Dodger Stadium has been the Los Angeles Dodgers' home field since 1962. Dodgers' Opening Day starting pitchers have a record there of nine wins, ten losses and five no decisions.

Season	Each year is linked to an article about that particular Dodgers season.
Pitcher (#)	Number of appearances as Opening Day starter with the Dodgers
W	Win
L	Loss
ND (W)	No decision by starting pitcher; Dodgers won game
ND (L)	No decision by starting pitcher; Dodgers lost game
Final score	Game score with Dodgers runs listed first
Location	Stadium in italics for home game
*	Advanced to the post-season
**	NL Champions
†	World Series Champions

== Pitchers ==
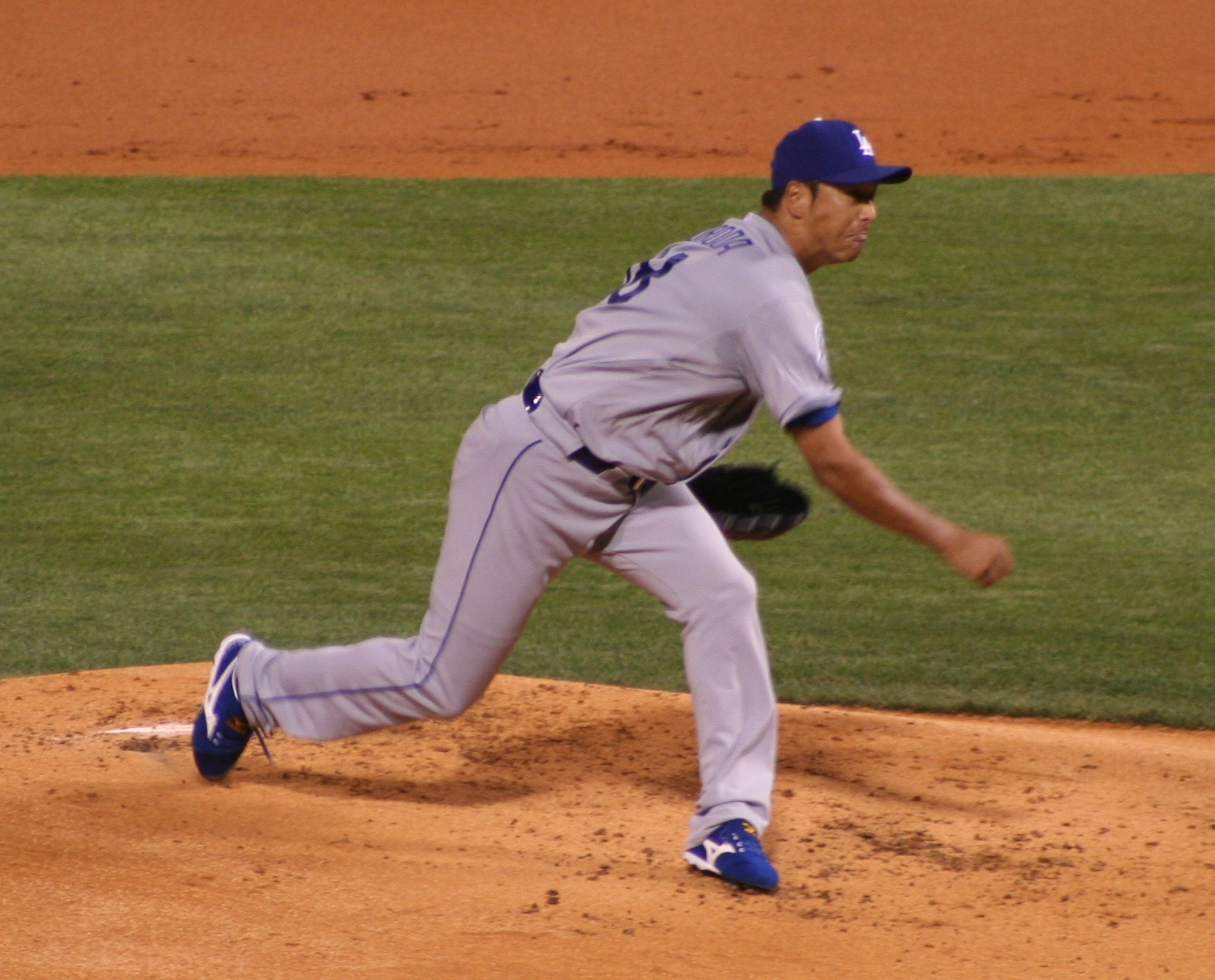
Hiroki Kuroda was the Dodgers' Opening Day starting pitcher in 2009.

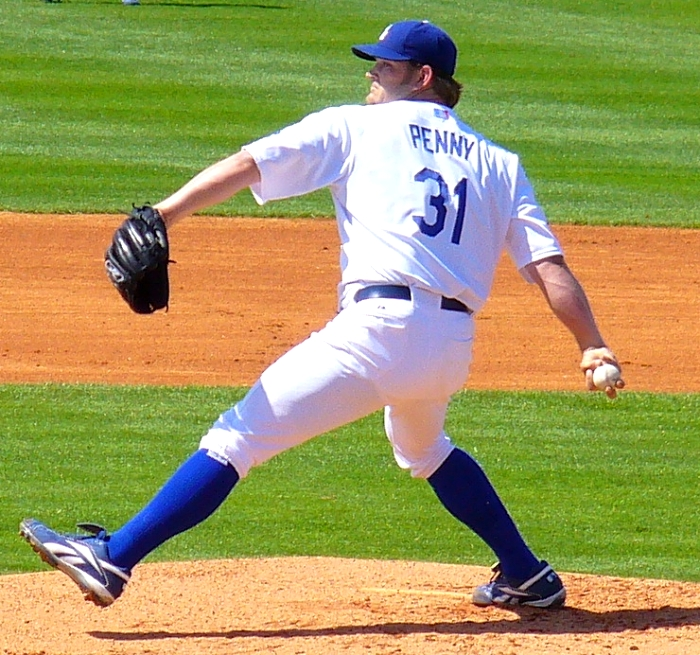
Brad Penny was the Dodgers' Opening Day starting pitcher in 2008.

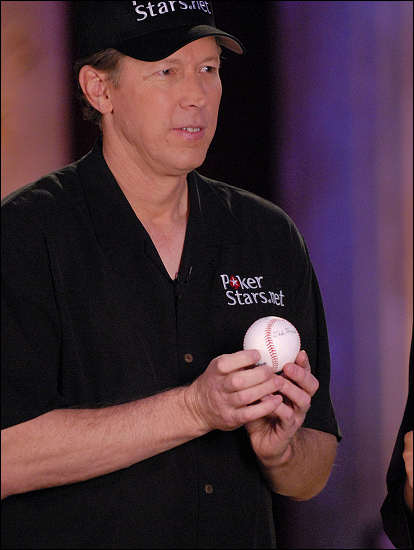
Orel Hershiser made four Opening Day starts for the Dodgers in the 1980s and 1990s.

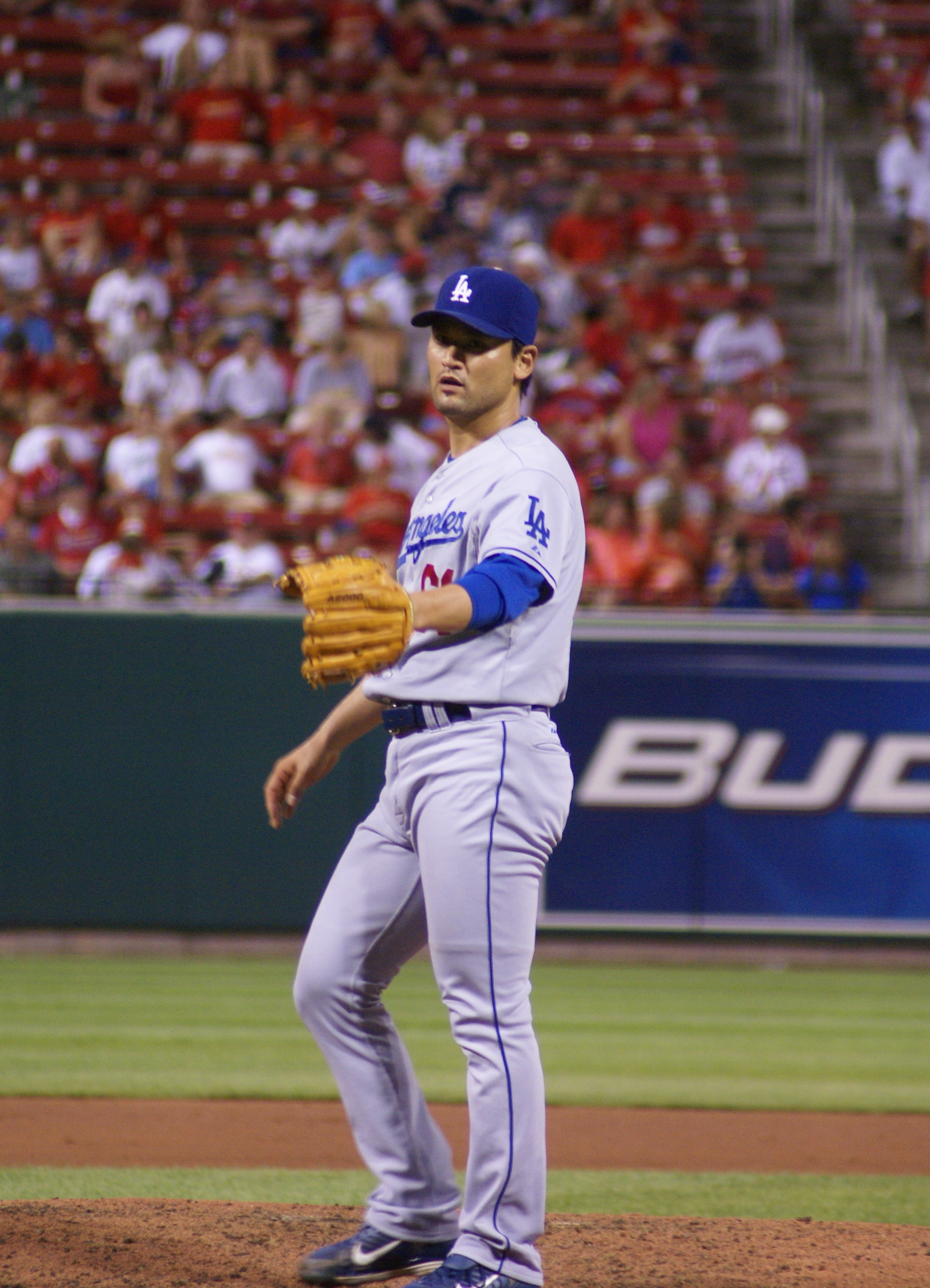
Chan Ho Park was the Dodgers' Opening Day starter in 2001.

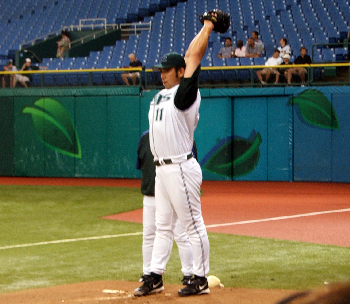
Hideo Nomo made two Opening Day starts for the Dodgers in 2003 and 2004.

Season	Pitcher	Decision	Final score	Opponent	Location	Ref(s)
1958	Don Drysdale	L	0–8	San Francisco Giants	Seals Stadium	
1959†	Don Drysdale (2)	L	1–6	Chicago Cubs	Wrigley Field	
1960	Don Drysdale (3)	W	3–2	Chicago Cubs	Los Angeles Memorial Coliseum	
1961	Don Drysdale (4)	W	6–2	Philadelphia Phillies	Los Angeles Memorial Coliseum	
1962	Johnny Podres	L	3–6	Cincinnati Reds	Dodger Stadium	
1963†	Don Drysdale (5)	W	5–1	Chicago Cubs	Wrigley Field	
1964	Sandy Koufax	W	4–0	St. Louis Cardinals	Dodger Stadium	
1965†	Don Drysdale (6)	W	6–1	New York Mets	Shea Stadium	
1966**	Claude Osteen	W	3–2	Houston Astros	Dodger Stadium	
1967	Bob Miller	L	1–6	Cincinnati Reds	Crosley Field	
1968	Claude Osteen (2)	L	0–2	Philadelphia Phillies	Dodger Stadium	
1969	Don Drysdale (7)	W	3–2	Cincinnati Reds	Dodger Stadium	
1970	Claude Osteen (3)	L	0–4	Cincinnati Reds	Dodger Stadium	
1971	Bill Singer	L	2–5	Houston Astros	Astrodome	
1972	Don Sutton	W	3–1	Cincinnati Reds	Riverfront Stadium	
1973	Don Sutton (2)	L	2–4	San Diego Padres	San Diego Stadium	
1974**	Don Sutton (3)	W	1–2	San Diego Padres	Dodger Stadium	
1975	Don Sutton (4)	ND (L)	1–2	Cincinnati Reds	Riverfront Stadium	
1976	Don Sutton (5)	L	2–4	San Francisco Giants	Candlestick Park	
1977**	Don Sutton (6)	W	5–1	San Francisco Giants	Dodger Stadium	
1978**	Don Sutton (7)	W	13–4	Atlanta Braves	Atlanta–Fulton County Stadium	
1979	Burt Hooton	ND (L)	3–4	San Diego Padres	Dodger Stadium	
1980	Burt Hooton (2)	L	2–3	Houston Astros	Astrodome	
1981†	Fernando Valenzuela	W	2–0	Houston Astros	Dodger Stadium	
1982	Jerry Reuss	ND (W)	4–3	San Francisco Giants	Dodger Stadium	
1983*	Fernando Valenzuela (2)	ND (W)	16–7	Houston Astros	Astrodome	
1984	Fernando Valenzuela (3)	L	7–11	St. Louis Cardinals	Dodger Stadium	
1985*	Fernando Valenzuela (4)	L	1–2	Houston Astros	Astrodome	
1986	Fernando Valenzuela (5)	W	2–1	San Diego Padres	Dodger Stadium	
1987	Orel Hershiser	L	3–4	Houston Astros	Astrodome	
1988†	Fernando Valenzuela (6)	L	1–5	San Francisco Giants	Dodger Stadium	
1989	Tim Belcher	L	4–6	Cincinnati Reds	Riverfront Stadium	
1990	Orel Hershiser (2)	ND (W)	4–2	San Diego Padres	Dodger Stadium	
1991	Tim Belcher (2)	W	6–4	Atlanta Braves	Atlanta–Fulton County Stadium	
1992	Ramón Martínez	L	1–8	San Francisco Giants	Dodger Stadium	
1993	Orel Hershiser (3)	L	3–6	Florida Marlins	Joe Robbie Stadium	
1994	Orel Hershiser (4)	ND (W)	4–3	Florida Marlins	Dodger Stadium	
1995*	Ramón Martínez (2)	W	8–7	Florida Marlins	Joe Robbie Stadium	
1996*	Ramón Martínez (3)	W	4–3	Houston Astros	Astrodome	
1997	Ramón Martínez (4)	L	0–3	Philadelphia Phillies	Dodger Stadium	
1998	Ramón Martínez (5)	L	0–6	St. Louis Cardinals	Busch Memorial Stadium	
1999	Kevin Brown	ND (W)	8–6	Arizona Diamondbacks	Dodger Stadium	
2000	Kevin Brown (2)	W	10–4	Montreal Expos	Olympic Stadium	
2001	Chan Ho Park	W	1–0	Milwaukee Brewers	Dodger Stadium	
2002	Kevin Brown (3)	L	2–9	San Francisco Giants	Dodger Stadium	
2003	Hideo Nomo	W	8–0	Arizona Diamondbacks	Bank One Ballpark	
2004*	Hideo Nomo (2)	L	2–8	San Diego Padres	Dodger Stadium	
2005	Derek Lowe	L	2–4	San Francisco Giants	SBC Park	
2006*	Derek Lowe (2)	L	10–11	Atlanta Braves	Dodger Stadium	
2007	Derek Lowe (3)	L	1–7	Milwaukee Brewers	Miller Park	
2008*	Brad Penny	W	5–0	San Francisco Giants	Dodger Stadium	
2009*	Hiroki Kuroda	W	4–1	San Diego Padres	Petco Park	
2010	Vicente Padilla	L	5–11	Pittsburgh Pirates	PNC Park	
2011	Clayton Kershaw	W	2–1	San Francisco Giants	Dodger Stadium	
2012	Clayton Kershaw (2)	ND (W)	5–3	San Diego Padres	Petco Park	
2013*	Clayton Kershaw (3)	W	4–0	San Francisco Giants	Dodger Stadium	
2014*	Clayton Kershaw (4)	W	3–1	Arizona Diamondbacks	Sydney Cricket Ground	
2015*	Clayton Kershaw (5)	ND (W)	6–3	San Diego Padres	Dodger Stadium	
2016*	Clayton Kershaw (6)	W	15–0	San Diego Padres	Petco Park	
2017**	Clayton Kershaw (7)	W	14–3	San Diego Padres	Dodger Stadium	
2018**	Clayton Kershaw (8)	L	0 –1	San Francisco Giants	Dodger Stadium	
2019 *	Hyun-jin Ryu	W	12 –5	Arizona Diamondbacks	Dodger Stadium	
2020 †	Dustin May	ND (W)	8 –1	San Francisco Giants	Dodger Stadium	
2021 *	Clayton Kershaw (9)	L	5 –8	Colorado Rockies	Coors Field	
2022 *	Walker Buehler	W	5 –3	Colorado Rockies	Coors Field	
2023 *	Julio Urías	W	8 –2	Arizona Diamondbacks	Dodger Stadium	
2024 †	Tyler Glasnow	ND (W)	5 –2	San Diego Padres	Gocheok Sky Dome	
2025 †	Yoshinobu Yamamoto	W	4 –1	Chicago Cubs	Tokyo Dome	
2026 *	Yoshinobu Yamamoto (2)	W	8–2	Arizona Diamondbacks	Dodger Stadium	
