= Toshikazu Sawazaki =

Japanese baseball player

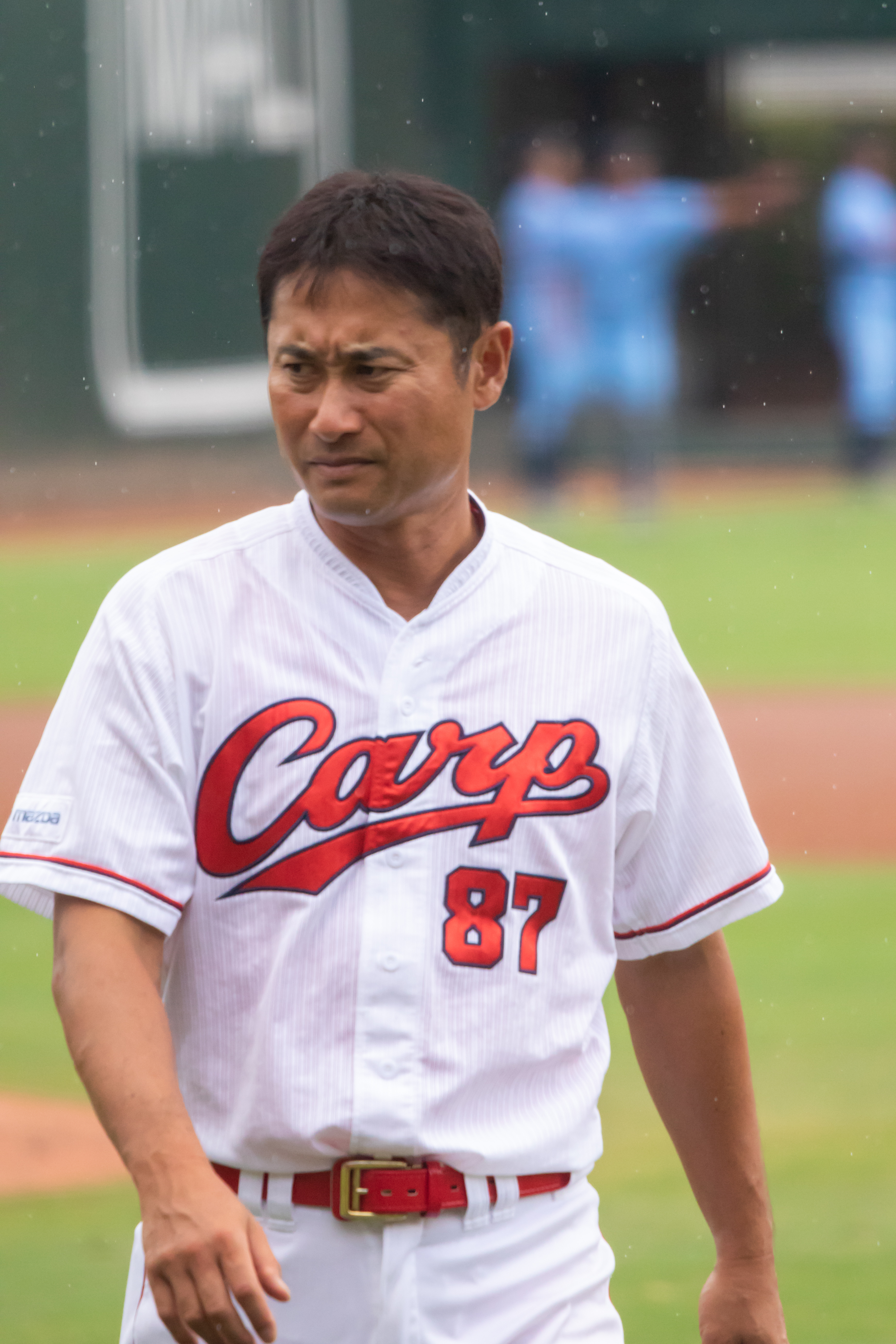
- Pitcher / Coach
- Born: September 21, 1974 (age 51); Chiba, Chiba, Japan
- Batted: Right Threw: Right

NPB debut
- April 6, 1997, for the Hiroshima Toyo Carp

Last NPB appearance
- April 5, 2005, for the Hiroshima Toyo Carp

NPB statistics (through 2005)
- Win–loss record: 24-17
- Saves: 15
- ERA: 4.70
- Strikeouts: 243

Teams
- As player: Hiroshima Toyo Carp (1997–2005); As coach: Hiroshima Toyo Carp (2006–2021)

Career highlights and awards
- 1997 Central League Rookie of the Year; 1x NPB All-Star (1997)

Toshikazu Sawazaki (澤﨑 俊和, Sawazaki Toshikazu; born March 16, 1973 in Chiba, Chiba, Japan) is a professional Japanese baseball player.
