= 2003 Colorado Rockies season =

2003 Colorado Rockies
- League: National League
- Division: West
- Ballpark: Coors Field
- City: Denver, Colorado
- Record: 74–88 (.457)
- Divisional place: 4th
- Owner: Jerry McMorris
- General manager: Dan O'Dowd
- Manager: Clint Hurdle
- Television: KTVD; Fox Sports Rocky Mountain (George Frazier, Drew Goodman)
- Radio: KOA (AM) (Jack Corrigan, Jeff Kingery)
- Stats: ESPN.com; Baseball Reference

The 2003 Colorado Rockies season was their 11th season in Major League Baseball and 9th season season at Coors Field. Clint Hurdle was the manager. They finished with a record of 74 wins and 88 losses, fourth in the National League West Division, and missing the postseason for the 8th consecutive season.

== Offseason ==
- November 16, 2002: Mike Hampton was traded by the Colorado Rockies with Juan Pierre and cash to the Florida Marlins for Charles Johnson, Preston Wilson, Pablo Ozuna, and Vic Darensbourg.
- January 8, 2003: Chris Stynes was signed as a free agent by the Colorado Rockies.
- January 23, 2003: Steve Reed was signed as a free agent by the Colorado Rockies.
- January 24, 2003: José Hernández and Mark Sweeney were signed as free agents by the Colorado Rockies.
- February 3, 2003: Darren Oliver was signed as a free agent by the Colorado Rockies.
- March 21, 2003: Jack Cust was traded by the Colorado Rockies to the Baltimore Orioles for Chris Richard.

== Regular season ==
=== Season standings ===
==== National League West ====
NL West
Team	W	L	Pct.	GB	Home	Road
San Francisco Giants	100	61	.621	—	57‍–‍24	43‍–‍37
Los Angeles Dodgers	85	77	.525	15½	46‍–‍35	39‍–‍42
Arizona Diamondbacks	84	78	.519	16½	45‍–‍36	39‍–‍42
Colorado Rockies	74	88	.457	26½	49‍–‍32	25‍–‍56
San Diego Padres	64	98	.395	36½	35‍–‍46	29‍–‍52

==== Record vs. opponents ====
2003 National League record Source: MLB Standings Grid – 2003
Team	AZ	ATL	CHC	CIN	COL	FLA	HOU	LAD	MIL	MON	NYM	PHI	PIT	SD	SF	STL	AL
Arizona	—	2–5	2–4	7–2	10–9	2–5	5–1	10–9	3–3	4–2	4–2	4–2	3–3	9–10	5–14	3–3	11–4
Atlanta	5–2	—	4–2	3–3	6–0	9–10	5–1	4–2	4–2	12–7	11–8	9–10	7–2	6–1	2–4	4–2	10–5
Chicago	4–2	2–4	—	10–7	3–3	4–2	9–7	2–4	10–6	3–3	5–1	1–5	10–8	4–2	4–2	8–9	9–9
Cincinnati	2–7	3–3	7–10	—	4–2	2–4	5–12	2–4	8–10	2–4	2–4	5–4	5–11	3–3	3–3	9–7	7–5
Colorado	9–10	0–6	3–3	2–4	—	4–2	2–4	7–12	5–1	3–4	2–5	2–4	3–6	12–7	7–12	4–2	9–6
Florida	5–2	10–9	2–4	4–2	2–4	—	1–5	2–5	7–2	13–6	12–7	13–6	2–4	5–1	1–5	3–3	9–6
Houston	1–5	1–5	7–9	12–5	4–2	5–1	—	4–2	9–8	3–3	2–4	2–4	10–6	3–3	2–4	11–7	11–7
Los Angeles	9–10	2–4	4–2	4–2	12–7	5–2	2–4	—	4–2	4–2	3–3	2–5	5–1	8–11	6–13	4–2	11–7
Milwaukee	3–3	2–4	6–10	10–8	1–5	2–7	8–9	2–4	—	0–6	6–3	4–2	10–7	5–1	1–5	3–13	5–7
Montreal	2–4	7–12	3–3	4–2	4–3	6–13	3–3	2–4	6–0	—	14–5	8–11	3–3	4–2	7–0	1–5	9–9
New York	2–4	8–11	1–5	4–2	5–2	7–12	4–2	3–3	3–6	5–14	—	7–12	4–2	3–3	4–2	1–5	5–10
Philadelphia	2–4	10–9	5–1	4–5	4–2	6–13	4–2	5–2	2–4	11–8	12–7	—	2–4	4–3	3–3	4–2	8–7
Pittsburgh	3–3	2–7	8–10	11–5	6–3	4–2	6–10	1–5	7–10	3–3	2–4	4–2	—	4–2	2–4	7–10	5–7
San Diego	10–9	1–6	2–4	3–3	7–12	1–5	3–3	11–8	1–5	2–4	3–3	3–4	2–4	—	5–14	2–4	8–10
San Francisco	14–5	4–2	2–4	3–3	12–7	5–1	4–2	13–6	5–1	0–7	2–4	3–3	4–2	14–5	—	5–1	10–8
St. Louis	3–3	2–4	9–8	7–9	2–4	3–3	7–11	2–4	13–3	5–1	5–1	2–4	10–7	4–2	1–5	—	10–8

=== Notable transactions ===
- April 9, 2003: Greg Vaughn was signed as a free agent by the Colorado Rockies.
- June 3, 2003: Ian Stewart was drafted by the Colorado Rockies in the 1st round of the 2003 amateur draft. Player signed June 11, 2003.
- June 20, 2003: José Hernández was traded by the Colorado Rockies to the Chicago Cubs for Mark Bellhorn.
- June 28, 2003: Gabe Kapler was purchased by the Boston Red Sox from the Colorado Rockies.
- July 13, 2003: Ben Petrick was traded by the Colorado Rockies to the Detroit Tigers for Adam Bernero.
- August 26, 2003: Gregg Zaun was signed as a free agent by the Colorado Rockies.

=== Major League debuts ===
- Batters:
  - René Reyes (Jul 22)
  - Garrett Atkins (Aug 3)
  - Clint Barmes (Sep 5)
- Pitchers:
  - Javier López (Apr 1)
  - Jason Young (May 12)
  - Matt Miller (Jun 27)
  - Chin-hui Tsao (Jul 25)

=== Roster ===
2003 Colorado Rockies
Roster
Pitchers: 43 Adam Bernero; 34 Shawn Chacón; 28 Aaron Cook; 36,35 Nelson Cruz; 27 Vic Darensbourg; 50 Scott Elarton; 40 Brian Fuentes; 32 Jason Jennings; 16 José Jiménez; 59 Todd Jones; 45 Javier López; 43 Dan Miceli; 46 Matt Miller; 15 Denny Neagle; 37 Darren Oliver; 39 Steve Reed; 51 Joe Roa; 55 Jesús Sánchez; 30 Justin Speier; 41 Denny Stark; 71 Chin-hui Tsao; 47 Cory Vance; 49 Jason Young	Catchers: 8 Bobby Estalella; 23 Charles Johnson; 19 Kit Pellow; 6 Mandy Romero; 31 Gregg Zaun; Infielders: 27 Garrett Atkins; 12 Clint Barmes; 26 Mark Bellhorn; 10 Ronnie Belliard; 5 Brent Butler; 17 Todd Helton; 18 José Hernández; 14 Greg Norton; 1 Pablo Ozuna; 7 Chris Stynes; 4 Juan Uribe; 5 Tony Womack	Outfielders: 19 Gabe Kapler; 24 Jay Payton; 6 Ben Petrick; 3 René Reyes; 21 Chris Richard; 25 Mark Sweeney; 20 Greg Vaughn; 33 Larry Walker; 44 Preston Wilson; Other batters: 11 Luke Allen	Manager: 13 Clint Hurdle; Coaches: 2 Sandy Alomar Sr. (third base); 36 Bob Apodaca (pitching); 29 Dave Collins (first base); 52 Duane Espy (hitting); 53 Rick Mathews (bullpen); 9 Jamie Quirk (bench); 56 Mark Strittmatter (bullpen catcher)

=== Game log ===
2003 Game Log
April (15-12)

#	Date	Opponent	Score	Win	Loss	Save	Attendance	Record
1	April 1	@ Astros	10–4	Oswalt (1–0)	Jennings (0–1)		43,241	0–1
2	April 2	@ Astros	8–7	Wagner (1–0)	Jiménez (0–1)		21,082	0–2
3	April 3	@ Astros	10–5	Cruz (1–0)	Robertson (0–1)		21,171	1–2
4	April 4	Diamondbacks	2–1	Chacón (1–0)	Kim (0–1)	Jiménez (1)	48,087	2–2
5	April 5	Diamondbacks	4–3 (10)	Reed (1–0)	Batista (0–1)		25,197	3–2
6	April 6	Diamondbacks	8–3	Jennings (1–1)	Schilling (0–1)		25,443	4–2
7	April 8	Cardinals	15–12 (13)	Eldred (1–0)	Miceli (0–1)		21,563	4–3
8	April 9	Cardinals	9–4	Cruz (2–0)	Tomko (0–1)		24,110	5–3
9	April 10	Cardinals	7–6	López (1–0)	Kline (0–1)	Jiménez (2)	24,586	6–3
10	April 11	@ Padres	6–4	Lawrence (2–0)	Oliver (0–1)	Villafuerte (2)	21,190	6–4
11	April 12	@ Padres	3–2	Speier (1–0)	Villafuerte (0–1)	Jiménez (3)	30,830	7–4
12	April 13	@ Padres	6–2	Wright (1–1)	Cook (0–1)		20,316	7–5
13	April 14	@ Diamondbacks	5–3	Cruz (3–0)	Kim (0–3)	Jiménez (4)	25,688	8–5
14	April 15	@ Diamondbacks	12–1	Chacón (2–0)	Patterson (0–1)		31,182	9–5
15	April 16	@ Diamondbacks	4–3	Mantei (3–0)	Jiménez (0–2)		28,588	9–6
16	April 17	@ Diamondbacks	11–2	Schilling (1–2)	Jennings (1–2)		32,507	9–7
17	April 18	Padres	12–1	Cook (1–1)	Pérez (0–2)		27,609	10–7
18	April 19	Padres	10–9	Reed (2–0)	Villafuerte (0–2)		27,031	11–7
19	April 20	Padres	8–0	Chacón (3–0)	Peavy (3–1)		28,005	12–7
20	April 22	@ Phillies	5–2	Millwood (3–1)	Oliver (0–2)	Mesa (4)	13,431	12–8
21	April 23	@ Phillies	6–4	Myers (1–2)	Jennings (1–3)	Mesa (5)	13,444	12–9
22	April 24	@ Phillies	9–1	Wolf (3–1)	Cook (1–2)		16,947	12–10
23	April 25	Cubs	11–7	Prior (4–1)	Cruz (3–1)		32,162	12–11
24	April 26	Cubs	8–5	Chacón (4–0)	Estes (1–3)	Jiménez (5)	35,604	13–11
25	April 27	Cubs	6–3	Oliver (1–2)	Zambrano (3–2)	Jiménez (6)	35,070	14–11
26	April 29	Reds	10–5	Jennings (2–3)	Reitsma (1–1)		26,206	15–11
27	April 30	Reds	13–11	Sullivan (2–0)	Miceli (0–2)	Williamson (6)	26,436	15–12

May (12-17)

#	Date	Opponent	Score	Win	Loss	Save	Attendance	Record
28	May 1	Reds	7–2	Austin (1–1)	Cruz (3–2)		28,788	15–13
29	May 2	@ Cubs	7–4	Estes (2–3)	Chacón (4–1)	Borowski (5)	29,236	15–14
30	May 3	@ Cubs	6–4	Speier (2–0)	Guthrie (0–2)	Jiménez (7)	38,332	16–14
31	May 4	@ Cubs	5–4 (10)	Borowski (1–0)	Reed (2–1)		37,223	16–15
32	May 6	@ Braves	3–2	Hernández (3–0)	Jones (0–1)	Smoltz (13)	18,108	16–16
33	May 8	@ Braves	12–6	Reynolds (2–1)	Cruz (3–3)	Smoltz (14)		16–17
34	May 8	@ Braves	5–2	Ortiz (4–2)	Chacón (4–2)	Smoltz (15)	22,829	16–18
35	May 9	@ Marlins	5–4	Looper (3–1)	Speier (2–1)		10,272	16–19
36	May 10	@ Marlins	5–4	Jennings (3–3)	Tejera (0–1)	Jiménez (8)	16,543	17–19
37	May 11	@ Marlins	7–2	Pavano (3–4)	Cook (1–3)		9,205	17–20
38	May 12	Mets	9–6	Trachsel (1–2)	Young (0–1)	Benítez (12)	25,443	17–21
39	May 13	Mets	9–8	Reed (3–1)	Cerda (0–1)	Jiménez (9)	25,043	18–21
40	May 14	Mets	6–5	Reed (4–1)	Stanton (2–3)	Jiménez (10)	26,755	19–21
41	May 15	Expos	4–2	Jones (1–1)	Tucker (0–1)	Jiménez (11)	23,197	20–21
42	May 16	Expos	4–1	Ayala (3–1)	Cruz (3–4)	Biddle (11)	27,117	20–22
43	May 17	Expos	6–4 (10)	Ayala (4–1)	Jones (1–2)	Biddle (12)	30,052	20–23
44	May 18	Expos	4–0	Chacón (5–2)	Ohka (3–5)		30,720	21–23
45	May 20	@ Dodgers	3–1	Brown (5–1)	Oliver (1–3)	Gagné (16)	27,251	21–24
46	May 21	@ Dodgers	3–2	Ishii (4–1)	Jennings (3–4)	Gagné (17)	25,332	21–25
47	May 22	@ Dodgers	4–3	Dreifort (4–3)	Cook (1–4)	Gagné (18)	27,461	21–26
48	May 23	Giants	10–7	Chacón (6–2)	Moss (5–3)		30,043	22–26
49	May 24	Giants	5–1	Ainsworth (4–4)	Elarton (0–1)		31,475je	22–27
50	May 25	Giants	5–1	Oliver (2–3)	Foppert (2–4)		33,723	23–27
51	May 26	Giants	12–7	Fuentes (1–0)	Nathan (5–2)		28,340	24–27
52	May 27	Dodgers	7–3	Cook (2–4)	Ishii (4–2)		26,465	25–27
53	May 28	Dodgers	6–0	Chacón (7–2)	Dreifort (4–4)		27,108	26–27
54	May 29	Dodgers	12–5	Elarton (1–1)	Pérez (4–3)		27,007	27–27
55	May 30	@ Giants	6–2	Ainsworth (5–4)	Oliver (2–4)		38,439	27–28
56	May 31	@ Giants	2–1	Foppert (3–4)	Jennings (3–5)	Worrell (14)	40,256	27–29

June (15-13)

#	Date	Opponent	Score	Win	Loss	Save	Attendance	Record
57	June 1	@ Giants	4–0	Rueter (6–1)	Cook (2–5)		41,404	27–30
58	June 2	@ Giants	4–1	Chacón (8–2)	Schmidt (4–2)	Jiménez (12)	34,231	28–30
59	June 3	Indians	7–3	Elarton (2–1)	Rodríguez (3–6)		22,326	29–30
60	June 4	Indians	2–1	Oliver (3–4)	Traber (2–3)	Jiménez (13)	22,222	30–30
61	June 5	Indians	7–4	Jennings (4–5)	Sabathia (4–3)	Jiménez (14)	25,221	31–30
62	June 7	Royals	13–11	George (6–4)	Chacón (8–3)	MacDougal (14)	25,421	31–31
63	June 7	Royals	9–5	Gilfillan (1–0)	Jones (1–3)		26,435	31–32
64	June 8	Royals	8–7	Elarton (3–1)	DeHart (0–2)	Jiménez (15)	30,084	32–32
65	June 10	@ Twins	5–0	Jennings (5–5)	Radke (5–6)		18,886	33–32
66	June 11	@ Twins	7–4	Lohse (6–4)	Cook (2–6)	Guardado (18)	17,942	33–33
67	June 12	@ Twins	15–3	Rogers (5–2)	Oliver (3–5)		18,003	33–34
68	June 13	@ Tigers	7–2	Chacón (9–3)	Cornejo (3–4)		19,212	34–34
69	June 14	@ Tigers	9–7	Ledezma (2–2)	Elarton (3–2)	Spurling (3)	19,260	34–35
70	June 15	@ Tigers	5–4	Jennings (6–5)	Knotts (2–5)	Jiménez (16)	19,323	35–35
71	June 16	Padres	7–5	Witasick (1–1)	Jiménez (0–3)	Beck (2)	22,716	35–36
72	June 17	Padres	4–3 (8)	Peavy (6–5)	Neagle (0–1)	Witasick (1)	22,178	35–37
73	June 18	Padres	5–3	Chacón (10–3)	Jarvis (0–1)	Speier (1)	22,033	36–37
74	June 19	Padres	10–5	Oliver (4–5)	Lawrence (4–8)		23,515	37–37
75	June 20	Tigers	7–5	Maroth (2–11)	Elarton (3–3)		29,603	37–38
76	June 21	Tigers	9–6	Jennings (7–5)	Sparks (0–4)		35,660	38–38
77	June 22	Tigers	5–3	Neagle (1–1)	Bernero (1–10)	Jiménez (17)	34,723	39–38
78	June 23	@ Padres	5–1	Chacón (11–3)	Jarvis (0–2)		18,072	40–38
79	June 24	@ Padres	5–2	Oliver (5–5)	Lawrence (4–9)	Jiménez (18)	15,915	41–38
80	June 25	@ Padres	7–6	Hackman (2–1)	Jones (1–4)	Beck (4)	19,908	41–39
81	June 27	@ Pirates	5–3	Fogg (4–3)	Jennings (7–6)	Williams (21)	37,566	41–40
82	June 28	@ Pirates	5–4	Neagle (2–1)	Benson (5–8)	Jiménez (19)	25,083	42–40
83	June 29	@ Pirates	9–0	Suppan (6–7)	Chacón (11–4)		20,475	42–41
84	June 30	Diamondbacks	8–7 (12)	Randolph (3–0)	Jiménez (0–4)		33,533	42–42

July (14-13)

#	Date	Opponent	Score	Win	Loss	Save	Attendance	Record
85	July 1	Diamondbacks	7–4	López (2–0)	Good (3–2)	Speier (2)	25,209	43–42
86	July 2	Diamondbacks	6–2	Jennings (8–6)	Patterson (1–4)	Fuentes (1)	47,032	44–42
87	July 3	Diamondbacks	8–4	Webb (5–2)	Neagle (2–2)		48,560	44–43
88	July 4	@ Brewers	8–6	Reed (5–1)	Estrella (2–1)	Speier (3)	21,144	45–43
89	July 5	@ Brewers	9–8	Oliver (6–5)	Ford (0–1)	Fuentes (2)	30,731	46–43
90	July 6	@ Brewers	3–1	Sheets (7–6)	Jiménez (0–5)	DeJean (17)	21,623	46–44
91	July 7	@ Diamondbacks	14–6	Randolph (4–0)	Cruz (3–5)		32,019	46–45
92	July 8	@ Diamondbacks	9–3	Webb (6–2)	Reed (5–2)		36,436	46–46
93	July 9	Giants	11–7	Cook (3–6)	Foppert (5–8)		31,139	47–46
94	July 10	Giants	11–3	Oliver (7–5)	Powell (0–1)		30,954	48–46
95	July 11	Dodgers	7–6	Fuentes (2–0)	Shuey (3–2)	Speier (4)	34,150	49–46
96	July 12	Dodgers	5–3	Jennings (9–6)	Ashby (2–6)	Speier (5)	41,696	50–46
97	July 13	Dodgers	9–3	Álvarez (1–1)	Neagle (2–3)		32,483	50–47
98	July 17	@ Giants	8–4	Moss (8–6)	Jennings (9–7)		41,052	50–48
99	July 18	@ Giants	7–0	Brower (6–2)	Oliver (7–6)		41,690	50–49
100	July 19	@ Giants	5–3	Schmidt (10–4)	Chacón (11–5)	Worrell (21)	42,607	50–50
101	July 20	@ Giants	8–4	Foppert (6–8)	Neagle (2–4)		42,620	50–51
102	July 21	@ Dodgers	4–1	Stark (1–0)	Ashby (2–7)		27,243	51–51
103	July 22	@ Dodgers	5–2	Nomo (11–8)	Jennings (9–8)	Gagné (34)	30,416	51–52
104	July 23	@ Dodgers	8–3	Oliver (8–6)	Ishii (9–4)		33,589	52–52
105	July 24	@ Dodgers	1–0 (11)	Shuey (4–2)	López (2–1)		33,144	52–53
106	July 25	Brewers	7–3	Tsao (1–0)	Obermueller (0–1)		39,013	53–53
107	July 26	Brewers	13–8	Cook (4–6)	De Los Santos (1–3)		40,675	54–53
108	July 27	Brewers	6–1	Jennings (10–8)	Franklin (7–7)		30,108	55–53
109	July 29	@ Reds	5–3	Oliver (9–6)	Haynes (2–11)	Speier (6)	25,663	56–53
110	July 30	@ Reds	3–2 (10)	Reitsma (8–3)	Jiménez (0–6)		23,962	56–54
111	July 31	@ Reds	5–4 (10)	Riedling (1–3)	Fuentes (2–1)		24,861	56–55

August (9-19)

#	Date	Opponent	Score	Win	Loss	Save	Attendance	Record
112	August 1	@ Pirates	12–11	Sánchez (1–0)	Bernero (1–13)		22,413	56–56
113	August 2	@ Pirates	1–0	Meadows (2–1)	Jennings (10–9)	Lincoln (4)	37,820	56–57
114	August 3	@ Pirates	16–4	Oliver (10–6)	D'Amico (6–11)	Jiménez (20)	16,839	57–57
115	August 5	Phillies	7–2	Myers (11–6)	Chacón (11–6)		28,034	57–58
116	August 6	Phillies	5–1	Tsao (2–0)	Duckworth (4–6)		27,599	58–58
117	August 7	Phillies	4–3	López (3–1)	Millwood (11–8)	Speier (7)	27,855	59–58
118	August 8	Pirates	13–6	Jiménez (1–6)	Mahomes (0–1)		28,362	60–58
119	August 9	Pirates	10–4	D'Amico (7–11)	Oliver (10–7)		34,611	60–59
120	August 10	Pirates	5–3	Figueroa (1–0)	Chacón (11–7)	Lincoln (5)	26,904	60–60
121	August 11	@ Expos	3–1	Day (6–4)	Jennings (10–10)	Biddle (28)	6,401	60–61
122	August 12	@ Expos	6–3 (11)	Fuentes (3–1)	Biddle (3–5)	López (1)	7,277	61–61
123	August 13	@ Expos	6–5	Vázquez (10–8)	Stark (1–1)	Ayala (3)	6,724	61–62
124	August 15	@ Mets	5–0	Glavine (8–11)	Oliver (10–8)		28,081	61–63
125	August 16	@ Mets	13–4	Seo (6–8)	Chacón (11–8)		28,233	61–64
126	August 17	@ Mets	6–4	Leiter (12–6)	Jennings (10–11)	Weathers (4)	28,393	61–65
127	August 18	@ Mets	8–0	Trachsel (12–7)	Tsao (2–1)		23,865	61–66
128	August 19	Marlins	10–2	Stark (2–1)	Pavano (9–11)		25,889	62–66
129	August 20	Marlins	9–3	Vance (1–0)	Redman (10–7)		23,534	63–66
130	August 21	Marlins	5–4	Speier (3–1)	Looper (4–3)		23,846	64–66
131	August 22	Braves	9–3	Maddux (12–10)	Jennings (10–12)		35,578	64–67
132	August 23	Braves	5–4	Hampton (12–5)	Tsao (2–2)	Smoltz (44)	42,303	64–68
133	August 24	Braves	12–6	Ortiz (18–5)	Stark (2–2)		31,227	64–69
134	August 26	Giants	3–1	Schmidt (13–5)	Oliver (10–9)	Worrell (28)	24,100	64–70
135	August 27	Giants	6–4	Ponson (16–9)	Jiménez (1–7)	Worrell (29)	24,972	64–71
136	August 28	Giants	6–1	Jennings (11–12)	Correia (1–1)		23,645	65–71
137	August 29	@ Dodgers	6–4	Brown (13–7)	Vance (1–1)	Gagné (45)	39,092	65–72
138	August 30	@ Dodgers	5–0	Mota (4–2)	Stark (2–3)		35,136	65–73
139	August 31	@ Dodgers	3–0	Pérez (11–10)	Oliver (10–10)	Gagné (46)	41,146	65–74

September (9-14)

#	Date	Opponent	Score	Win	Loss	Save	Attendance	Record
140	September 2	@ Giants	2–1	Herges (3–2)	Bernero (1–14)	Worrel (33)	39,419	65–75
141	September 3	@ Giants	7–6	Nathan (9–3)	Fuentes (3–2)		38,490	65–76
142	September 5	Dodgers	8–7	Mota (5–2)	Reed (5–3)	Gagné (48)	26,828	65–77
143	September 6	Dodgers	10–2	Pérez (12–10)	Oliver (10–11)		24,393	65–78
144	September 7	Dodgers	6–2	Álvarez (4–1)	Jiménez (1–8)	Gagné (49)	24,553	65–79
145	September 9	@ Cardinals	8–1	Jennings (12–12)	Haren (3–6)		27,591	66–79
146	September 10	@ Cardinals	10–2	Tomko (12–8)	Elarton (3–4)		25,396	66–80
147	September 11	@ Cardinals	9–4	Oliver (11–11)	Hitchcock (3–4)		28,801	67–80
148	September 12	@ Diamondbacks	8–2	Jiménez (2–8)	Dessens (7–8)		32,922	68–80
149	September 13	@ Diamondbacks	16–6	Batista (10–8)	Young (0–2)		37,139	68–81
150	September 14	@ Diamondbacks	5–0	Johnson (5–8)	Jennings (12–13)		35,153	68–82
151	September 16	Astros	14–4	Robertson (15–7)	Tsao (2–3)		22,328	68–83
152	September 17	Astros	7–5	Oliver (12–11)	Villone (6–5)	Speier (8)	22,454	69–83
153	September 18	Astros	6–0	Miller (14–12)	Jiménez (2–9)		21,718	69–84
154	September 19	Padres	6–5	Elarton (4–4)	Howard (1–3)	Fuentes (3)	31,976	70–84
155	September 20	Padres	11–3	Lawrence (9–15)	Vance (1–2)		28,028	70–85
156	September 21	Padres	5–3	Tsao (3–3)	Eaton (8–12)	Fuentes (4)	28,167	71–85
157	September 23	Diamondbacks	20–9	Oliver (13–11)	Webb (10–8)		22,686	72–85
158	September 24	Diamondbacks	6–3	Johnson (6–8)	Jiménez (2–10)	Mantei (27)	24,465	72–86
159	September 25	Diamondbacks	8–7	Villarreal (10–7)	Fuentes (3–3)	Mantei (28)	23,056	72–87
160	September 26	@ Padres	5–0	Eaton (9–12)	Vance (1–3)		45,588	72–88
161	September 27	@ Padres	10–2	Stark (3–3)	Bynum (1–4)		42,479	73–88
162	September 28	@ Padres	10–8	López (4–1)	Witasick (3–7)	Speier (9)	60,988	74–88

== Player stats ==
= Indicates team leader

=== Batting ===
==== Starters by position ====
Note: Pos = Position; G = Games played; AB = At bats; H = Hits; Avg. = Batting average; HR = Home runs; RBI = Runs batted in

Pos	Player	G	AB	H	Avg.	HR	RBI
C	Charles Johnson	108	356	82	.230	20	61
1B	Todd Helton	160	583	209	.358	33	117
2B	Ronnie Belliard	116	447	124	.277	8	50
SS	Juan Uribe	87	316	80	.253	10	33
3B	Chris Stynes	138	443	113	.335	11	73
LF	Jay Payton	157	600	181	.302	28	89
CF	Preston Wilson	155	600	169	.282	36	141
RF	Larry Walker	143	454	129	.284	16	79

==== Other batters ====
Note: G = Games played; AB = At bats; H = Hits; Avg. = Batting average; HR = Home runs; RBI = Runs batted in

Player	G	AB	H	Avg.	HR	RBI
José Hernández	69	257	61	.237	8	27
Greg Norton	114	179	47	.263	6	31
Bobby Estalella	46	140	28	.200	7	21
René Reyes	53	116	30	.259	2	7
Mark Bellhorn	48	110	26	.236	0	4
Mark Sweeney	67	97	25	.258	2	14
Brent Butler	37	90	19	.211	1	4
Tony Womack	21	79	15	.190	0	5
Garrett Atkins	25	69	11	.159	0	4
Gabe Kapler	39	67	15	.224	0	4
Gregg Zaun	15	46	12	.261	3	8
Pablo Ozuna	17	40	8	.200	0	2
Greg Vaughn	22	37	7	.189	3	5
Chris Richard	19	27	6	.222	1	3
Clint Barmes	12	25	8	.320	0	2
Kit Pellow	11	18	8	.444	1	4
Mandy Romero	3	7	3	.429	0	0
Ben Petrick	3	2	0	.000	0	0
Luke Allen	2	2	0	.000	0	0

=== Pitching ===
==== Starting pitchers ====
Note: G = Games pitched; IP = Innings pitched; W = Wins; L = Losses; ERA = Earned run average; SO = Strikeouts

Player	G	IP	W	L	ERA	SO
Jason Jennings	32	181.1	12	13	5.11	119
Darren Oliver	33	180.1	13	11	5.04	88
Shawn Chacón	23	137.0	11	8	4.60	93
Denny Stark	17	78.2	3	3	5.83	30
Scott Elarton	11	51.2	4	4	6.27	20
Chin-hui Tsao	9	43.1	3	3	6.02	29
Denny Neagle	7	35.1	2	4	7.90	21

==== Other pitchers ====
Note: G = Games pitched; IP = Innings pitched; W = Wins; L = Losses; ERA = Earned run average; SO = Strikeouts

Player	G	IP	W	L	ERA	SO
Aaron Cook	43	124.0	4	6	6.02	43
Nelson Cruz	20	53.2	3	5	7.21	38
Cory Vance	9	27.1	1	3	5.60	12
Jason Young	8	21.1	0	2	8.44	18

==== Relief pitchers ====
Note: G = Games pitched; W = Wins; L = Losses; SV = Saves; ERA = Earned run average; SO = Strikeouts

Player	G	W	L	SV	ERA	SO
José Jiménez	63	2	10	20	5.22	45
Brian Fuentes	75	3	3	4	2.75	82
Javier López	75	4	1	1	3.70	40
Justin Speier	72	3	1	9	4.05	66
Steve Reed	67	5	3	0	3.27	39
Todd Jones	33	1	4	0	8.24	28
Adam Bernero	31	0	2	0	5.23	26
Dan Miceli	14	0	2	0	5.66	18
Jesús Sánchez	9	0	0	0	9.00	2
Joe Roa	4	0	0	0	4.05	4
Matt Miller	4	0	0	0	2.08	5
Vic Darensbourg	3	0	0	0	0.00	0

== Farm system ==
Level	Team	League	Manager
AAA	Colorado Springs Sky Sox	Pacific Coast League	Rick Sofield
AA	Tulsa Drillers	Texas League	Marv Foley
A	Visalia Oaks	California League	Stu Cole
A	Asheville Tourists	South Atlantic League	Joe Mikulik
A-Short Season	Tri-City Dust Devils	Northwest League	Ron Gideon
Rookie	Casper Rockies	Pioneer League	P. J. Carey

Records
Preceded by 2002	Colorado Rockies seasons 2003	Succeeded by 2004
