= 2003 Chicago Cubs season =

Major League Baseball season

2003 Chicago Cubs
- National League Central champions
- League: National League
- Division: Central
- Ballpark: Wrigley Field
- City: Chicago
- Record: 88–74 (.543)
- Divisional place: 1st
- Owners: Tribune Company
- General managers: Jim Hendry
- Managers: Dusty Baker
- Television: FSN Chicago; Superstation WGN; WCIU-TV (Chip Caray, Steve Stone)
- Radio: WGN (Pat Hughes, Ron Santo)
- Stats: ESPN.com; Baseball Reference

The 2003 Chicago Cubs season was the 132nd season of the Chicago Cubs franchise, the 128th in the National League and the 88th at Wrigley Field. The Cubs were managed by Dusty Baker in his first year in Chicago. The Cubs went 88–74 during the 2003 season and won the National League Central for the first time since the division's formation in 1994, and the team's first division title since its 1989 NL East title. In the NLDS, the Cubs defeated the Atlanta Braves three games to two for their first postseason series win since 1908. The Cubs lost to the Florida Marlins four games to three in the NLCS.

== Previous season ==
The Cubs were coming off of a poor year in 2002, finishing 67–95 in fifth place in the NL Central and costing manager Don Baylor his job. The Cubs hired Dusty Baker, fresh off his World Series appearance with the San Francisco Giants, to replace Baylor.

== Offseason ==
- December 4, 2002: Todd Hundley and Chad Hermansen were traded by the Cubs to the Los Angeles Dodgers for Mark Grudzielanek and Eric Karros.
- January 13, 2003: Midre Cummings was signed as a free agent with the Cubs.
- January 13, 2003: Aaron Small was signed as a free agent with the Cubs.
- March 4, 2003: Trenidad Hubbard was signed as a free agent with the Cubs.
- March 29, 2003: Aaron Small was released by the Cubs.

== Regular season ==
=== Summary ===
The team's success can be attributed first and foremost to its starting rotation, which featured Mark Prior, Kerry Wood, Carlos Zambrano, and Matt Clement, each of whom won at least 13 games. The pitching staff as a whole led the National League in strikeouts with 1,404, over 100 more than any other team. While not nearly as dominant in hitting, the Cubs' lineup was bolstered by acquisitions at what was a very active trade deadline, including Aramis Ramírez, Randall Simon, and Kenny Lofton.

The team started slow but finished September with a 19–8 record to win the NL Central. As the division winner with the third best record, the Cubs faced the Atlanta Braves who had finished the season in a tie for the best record in the majors in a best of five games format. The Cubs won the first game of the series and the teams alternated wins leading to a game 5 at Turner Field to determine the series winner. The Cubs won the game 5–1.

The series win, their first since 1908, resulted in a matchup against the Florida Marlins for the right to go to the World Series. The Marlins won the first game in Chicago, but the Cubs won the next three to take a three games to one lead. Florida won game five as the series shifted back to Chicago for games six and seven. With Mark Prior on the mound, the Cubs took a 3–1 lead into the 8th inning before a series of errors led to an 8-run inning for the Marlins. The win forced a game seven with Kerry Wood on the mound for the Cubs. In a high-scoring affair that included a Kerry Wood home run, the Marlins shocked the Cubs 9–6 to deny the Cubs a trip to their first World Series since 1945.

The 2003 season brought a great deal of national attention to the Cubs, both positive and negative. On one hand, their surprising regular season run to first place in the NL Central, and the excellent performances of their top three pitchers, all of whom were age 26 or younger, seemed to suggest that the Cubs would be contenders for the foreseeable future. At the same time, however, the Cubs' squandering of the 3–1 series lead in the NLCS, and the manner in which it occurred, seemed to reaffirm the perceptions of the Cubs as "lovable losers" and a cursed franchise.

=== Season standings ===
==== National League Central ====
NL Central
Team	W	L	Pct.	GB	Home	Road
Chicago Cubs	88	74	.543	—	44‍–‍37	44‍–‍37
Houston Astros	87	75	.537	1	48‍–‍33	39‍–‍42
St. Louis Cardinals	85	77	.525	3	48‍–‍33	37‍–‍44
Pittsburgh Pirates	75	87	.463	13	39‍–‍42	36‍–‍45
Cincinnati Reds	69	93	.426	19	35‍–‍46	34‍–‍47
Milwaukee Brewers	68	94	.420	20	31‍–‍50	37‍–‍44

==== Record vs. opponents ====
2003 National League record Source: MLB Standings Grid – 2003
Team	AZ	ATL	CHC	CIN	COL	FLA	HOU	LAD	MIL	MON	NYM	PHI	PIT	SD	SF	STL	AL
Arizona	—	2–5	2–4	7–2	10–9	2–5	5–1	10–9	3–3	4–2	4–2	4–2	3–3	9–10	5–14	3–3	11–4
Atlanta	5–2	—	4–2	3–3	6–0	9–10	5–1	4–2	4–2	12–7	11–8	9–10	7–2	6–1	2–4	4–2	10–5
Chicago	4–2	2–4	—	10–7	3–3	4–2	9–7	2–4	10–6	3–3	5–1	1–5	10–8	4–2	4–2	8–9	9–9
Cincinnati	2–7	3–3	7–10	—	4–2	2–4	5–12	2–4	8–10	2–4	2–4	5–4	5–11	3–3	3–3	9–7	7–5
Colorado	9–10	0–6	3–3	2–4	—	4–2	2–4	7–12	5–1	3–4	2–5	2–4	3–6	12–7	7–12	4–2	9–6
Florida	5–2	10–9	2–4	4–2	2–4	—	1–5	2–5	7–2	13–6	12–7	13–6	2–4	5–1	1–5	3–3	9–6
Houston	1–5	1–5	7–9	12–5	4–2	5–1	—	4–2	9–8	3–3	2–4	2–4	10–6	3–3	2–4	11–7	11–7
Los Angeles	9–10	2–4	4–2	4–2	12–7	5–2	2–4	—	4–2	4–2	3–3	2–5	5–1	8–11	6–13	4–2	11–7
Milwaukee	3–3	2–4	6–10	10–8	1–5	2–7	8–9	2–4	—	0–6	6–3	4–2	10–7	5–1	1–5	3–13	5–7
Montreal	2–4	7–12	3–3	4–2	4–3	6–13	3–3	2–4	6–0	—	14–5	8–11	3–3	4–2	7–0	1–5	9–9
New York	2–4	8–11	1–5	4–2	5–2	7–12	4–2	3–3	3–6	5–14	—	7–12	4–2	3–3	4–2	1–5	5–10
Philadelphia	2–4	10–9	5–1	4–5	4–2	6–13	4–2	5–2	2–4	11–8	12–7	—	2–4	4–3	3–3	4–2	8–7
Pittsburgh	3–3	2–7	8–10	11–5	6–3	4–2	6–10	1–5	7–10	3–3	2–4	4–2	—	4–2	2–4	7–10	5–7
San Diego	10–9	1–6	2–4	3–3	7–12	1–5	3–3	11–8	1–5	2–4	3–3	3–4	2–4	—	5–14	2–4	8–10
San Francisco	14–5	4–2	2–4	3–3	12–7	5–1	4–2	13–6	5–1	0–7	2–4	3–3	4–2	14–5	—	5–1	10–8
St. Louis	3–3	2–4	9–8	7–9	2–4	3–3	7–11	2–4	13–3	5–1	5–1	2–4	10–7	4–2	1–5	—	10–8

=== Transactions ===
- April 21, 2003: Trenidad Hubbard was purchased by the Cubs from Oaxaca (Mexican League).
- May 9, 2003: Alan Benes was sent to the Texas Rangers by the Cubs as part of a conditional deal.
- June 3, 2003: Sam Fuld was drafted by the Cubs in the 24th round of the 2003 amateur draft, but did not sign.
- June 3, 2003: Tim Lincecum was drafted by the Cubs in the 48th round of the 2003 amateur draft, but did not sign.
- June 20, 2003: Mark Bellhorn was traded by the Cubs to the Colorado Rockies for José Hernández.
- July 23, 2003: Kenny Lofton and Aramis Ramírez were traded by the Pittsburgh Pirates with cash to the Cubs for a player to be named later, José Hernández, and Matt Bruback. The Cubs sent Bobby Hill (August 15, 2003) to the Pirates to complete the trade.
- August 17, 2003: Randall Simon was traded by the Pirates to the Cubs for Ray Sadler.

=== Roster ===
2003 Chicago Cubs
Roster
Pitchers: 57 Antonio Alfonseca; 35 Alan Benes; 48 Joe Borowski; 30 Matt Clement; 51 Juan Cruz; 55 Shawn Estes; 44 Kyle Farnsworth; 31 Mark Guthrie; 52 Sergio Mitre; 50 Phil Norton; 22 Mark Prior; 37 Mike Remlinger; 62 Félix Sánchez; 43 Dave Veres; 40 Todd Wellemeyer; 34 Kerry Wood; 38 Carlos Zambrano	Catchers: 9 Paul Bako; 27 Damian Miller; 29 Josh Paul; Infielders: 28 Mark Bellhorn; 19 Hee-Seop Choi; 8 Alex Gonzalez; 11 Mark Grudzielanek; 29 Lenny Harris; 15 José Hernández; 17 Bobby Hill; 32 Eric Karros; 7,6 Ramón Martínez; 1 Augie Ojeda; 15,16 Aramis Ramírez; 35 Randall Simon; 5 Tony Womack	Outfielders: 18 Moisés Alou; 4 Doug Glanville; 5,24 Tom Goodwin; 45 Trenidad Hubbard; 28 David Kelton; 1,7 Kenny Lofton; 25 Troy O'Leary; 20 Corey Patterson; 21 Sammy Sosa	Manager: 12 Dusty Baker; Coaches: 2 Gene Clines (first base); 15 Sonny Jackson (special asst); 3 Wendell Kim (third base); 59 Juan Lopez (bullpen); 36 Gary Matthews (hitting); 46 Dick Pole (bench); 41 Larry Rothschild (pitching)

=== Game log ===
2003 Game Log: 88–74
March: 1–0

#	Date	Opponent	Score	Win	Loss	Save	Attendance	Record	Box
1	March 31	@ Mets	15–2	Wood (1–0)	Glavine (0–1)		53,586	1–0	

April: 14–12

#	Date	Opponent	Score	Win	Loss	Save	Attendance	Record	Box
2	April 2	@ Mets	4–1	Leiter (1–0)	Clement (0–1)	Benítez (1)	20,594	1–1	
3	April 3	@ Mets	6–3	Prior (1–0)	Trachsel (0–1)		17,244	2–1	
4	April 4	@ Reds	10–9	Williamson (1–0)	Veres (0–1)		29,048	2–2	
5	April 5	@ Reds	9–7	Zambrano (1–0)	Haynes (0–2)	Borowski (1)	28,908	3–2	
6	April 6	@ Reds	5–4	White (1–0)	Guthrie (0–1)	Williamson (1)	24,023	3–3	
–	April 7	Expos	Postponed (snow) Rescheduled for April 8						
7	April 8	Expos	6–1	Clement (1–1)	Day (1–1)		29,138	4–3	
8	April 9	Expos	3–0	Prior (2–0)	Vázquez (1–1)		29,966	5–3	
9	April 10	Expos	7–1	Armas (2–1)	Estes (0–1)		30,225	5–4	
10	April 11	Pirates	3–2	D'Amico (1–1)	Zambrano (1–1)	Williams (5)	33,605	5–5	
11	April 12	Pirates	4–0	Wood (2–0)	Benson (2–1)	Borowski (2)	35,226	6–5	
12	April 13	Pirates	4–3	Farnsworth (1–0)	Boehringer (0–1)	Borowski (3)	29,558	7–5	
13	April 14	Reds	11–3	Anderson (1–1)	Prior (2–1)	Riedling (1)	37,528	7–6	
14	April 15	Reds	11–1	Estes (1–1)	Graves (0–2)		31,642	8–6	
15	April 16	Reds	10–4	Zambrano (2–1)	Wilson (0–1)		27,388	9–6	
16	April 17	Reds	16–3	Wood (3–0)	Haynes (0–4)	Benes (1)	29,672	10–6	
17	April 18	@ Pirates	7–2	Clement (2–1)	Benson (2–2)		15,037	11–6	
18	April 19	@ Pirates	6–1 (10)	Prior (3–1)	Sauerbeck (0–1)		31,518	12–6	
19	April 20	@ Pirates	8–2	Torres (2–0)	Estes (1–2)		14,854	12–7	
20	April 22	Padres	7–2	Zambrano (3–1)	Lawrence (2–2)		35,185	13–7	
21	April 23	Padres	2–0	Eaton (1–1)	Wood (3–1)	Herges (1)	35,768	13–8	
22	April 24	Padres	2–1	Pérez (1–2)	Clement (2–2)	Wright (2)	35,673	13–9	
23	April 25	@ Rockies	11–7	Prior (4–1)	Cruz (3–1)		32,162	14–9	
24	April 26	@ Rockies	8–5	Chacón (4–0)	Estes (1–3)	Jiménez (5)	35,604	14–10	
25	April 27	@ Rockies	6–3	Oliver (1–2)	Zambrano (3–2)	Jiménez (6)	35,070	14–11	
26	April 29	@ Giants	4–2	Wood (4–1)	Rueter (2–1)	Borowski (4)	39,839	15–11	
27	April 30	@ Giants	5–0	Schmidt (3–0)	Clement (2–3)		40,124	15–12	

May: 14–12

#	Date	Opponent	Score	Win	Loss	Save	Attendance	Record	Box
28	May 1	@ Giants	5–1 (10)	Cruz (1–0)	Worrell (1–1)		41,524	16–12	
29	May 2	Rockies	7–4	Estes (2–3)	Chacón (4–1)	Borowski (5)	29,236	17–12	
30	May 3	Rockies	6–4	Speier (2–0)	Guthrie (0–2)	Jiménez (7)	38,332	17–13	
31	May 4	Rockies	5–4 (10)	Borowski (1–0)	Reed (2–1)		37,223	18–13	
32	May 5	Brewers	5–3	Sheets (3–3)	Clement (2–4)	DeJean (6)	35,304	18–14	
33	May 6	Brewers	9–6	Leskanic (2–0)	Cruz (1–1)	DeJean (7)	34,240	18–15	
34	May 7	Brewers	2–1	Estes (3–3)	Rusch (1–6)	Borowski (6)	37,574	19–15	
35	May 9	Cardinals	6–3	Morris (4–2)	Zambrano (3–3)	Fassero (1)	38,531	19–16	
36	May 10	Cardinals	3–2 (10)	Remlinger (1–0)	Eldred (2–1)		38,106	20–16	
–	May 11	Cardinals	Postponed (rain) Rescheduled for September 2						
37	May 12	@ Brewers	11–5	Prior (5–1)	Rusch (1–7)		19,106	21–16	
38	May 13	@ Brewers	7–2	Estes (4–3)	Quevedo (0–1)		18,454	22–16	
39	May 14	@ Brewers	6–1	Zambrano (4–3)	Kinney (2–3)		27,566	23–16	
40	May 15	@ Brewers	4–2 (17)	Farnsworth (2–0)	Kieschnick (0–1)	Wellemeyer (1)	31,624	24–16	
41	May 16	@ Cardinals	7–4	Williams (5–0)	Clement (2–5)	Eldred (2)	42,589	24–17	
42	May 17	@ Cardinals	2–1	Remlinger (2–0)	Kline (1–4)	Borowski (7)	45,385	25–17	
43	May 18	@ Cardinals	6–3	Hermanson (1–1)	Cruz (1–2)	Eldred (3)	45,773	25–18	
44	May 19	@ Cardinals	2–0	Morris (5–3)	Zambrano (4–4)		46,734	25–19	
–	May 20	@ Pirates	Postponed (rain) Rescheduled for September 19						
45	May 21	@ Pirates	5–2	D'Amico (4–4)	Wood (4–2)	Williams (13)	35,086	25–20	
46	May 22	@ Pirates	3–2	Remlinger (3–0)	Sauerbeck (0–4)	Borowski (8)	14,544	26–20	
47	May 23	@ Astros	7–5	Linebrink (1–1)	Prior (5–2)	Wagner (13)	29,660	26–21	
48	May 24	@ Astros	3–2	Estes (5–3)	Redding (3–4)	Borowski (9)	37,839	27–21	
49	May 25	@ Astros	7–3	Zambrano (5–4)	Miller (2–6)		37,565	28–21	
50	May 26	Pirates	10–0	Fogg (2–2)	Wood (4–3)		40,225	28–22	
51	May 27	Pirates	9–4	Benson (5–5)	Clement (2–6)		35,961	28–23	
52	May 28	Pirates	5–4	Prior (6–2)	D'Amico (4–5)	Borowski (10)	32,406	29–23	
53	May 30	Astros	9–1	Miller (3–6)	Estes (5–4)		36,687	29–24	
54	May 31	Astros	1–0 (16)	Wellemeyer (1–0)	Stone (4–1)		37,719	30–24	

June: 12–15

#	Date	Opponent	Score	Win	Loss	Save	Attendance	Record	Box
55	June 1	Astros	9–3	Robertson (4–3)	Wood (4–4)		37,787	30–25	
56	June 3	Devil Rays	3–2	Remlinger (4–0)	Levine (2–2)		32,210	31–25	
57	June 4	Devil Rays	5–2	Zambrano (2–3)	Estes (5–5)		33,317	31–26	
58	June 5	Devil Rays	8–1	Clement (3–6)	Brazelton (1–5)		28,713	32–26	
59	June 6	Yankees	5–3	Wells (8–2)	Zambrano (5–5)	Rivera (5)	39,359	32–27	
60	June 7	Yankees	5–2	Wood (5–4)	Clemens (6–4)		39,363	33–27	
61	June 8	Yankees	8–7	Prior (7–2)	Pettitte (5–6)	Borowski (11)	39,341	34–27	
62	June 10	@ Orioles	4–0	Estes (6–5)	Hentgen (1–4)		32,484	35–27	
63	June 11	@ Orioles	7–6	Clement (4–6)	Daal (4–7)	Borowski (12)	28,013	36–27	
64	June 12	@ Orioles	6–1	Helling (4–4)	Zambrano (5–6)	Driskill (1)	30,557	36–28	
65	June 13	@ Blue Jays	5–1	Escobar (4–3)	Wood (5–5)		23,018	36–29	
66	June 14	@ Blue Jays	4–2	Prior (8–2)	Davis (3–4)	Borowski (13)	33,167	37–29	
67	June 15	@ Blue Jays	5–4 (10)	López (1–1)	Guthrie (0–3)		34,221	37–30	
68	June 16	@ Reds	4–3	Clement (5–6)	Anderson (1–3)	Borowski (14)	28,669	38–30	
69	June 17	@ Reds	2–1 (10)	Williamson (4–2)	Remlinger (4–1)		28,999	38–31	
70	June 18	@ Reds	4–1	Wood (6–5)	Haynes (1–6)		39,053	39–31	
71	June 19	@ Reds	3–1	Wilson (5–4)	Prior (8–3)	Williamson (17)	41,692	39–32	
72	June 20	White Sox	12–3	Garland (5–6)	Estes (6–6)		39,080	39–33	
73	June 21	White Sox	7–6	Buehrle (4–10)	Clement (5–7)	Koch (10)	38,938	39–34	
74	June 22	White Sox	2–1	Zambrano (6–6)	Marte (2–1)	Borowski (15)	38,223	40–34	
75	June 24	Brewers	9–1	Wood (7–5)	Quevedo (1–4)		40,389	41–34	
76	June 25	Brewers	12–6 (10)	Vizcaíno (2–3)	Wellemeyer (1–1)		38,357	41–35	
77	June 26	Brewers	5–3	Estrella (2–0)	Borowski (1–1)	DeJean (16)	39,711	41–36	
78	June 27	@ White Sox	4–3	Koch (3–4)	Alfonseca (0–1)		45,147	41–37	
79	June 28	@ White Sox	7–6	Koch (4–4)	Cruz (1–3)		45,440	41–38	
80	June 29	@ White Sox	5–2	Wood (8–5)	Loaiza (11–3)		44,858	42–38	
81	June 30	@ Phillies	4–3	Padilla (7–7)	Estes (6–7)	Mesa (18)	23,323	42–39	

July: 12–14

#	Date	Opponent	Score	Win	Loss	Save	Attendance	Record	Box
82	July 1	@ Phillies	4–3	Adams (1–2)	Remlinger (4–2)		25,307	42–40	
83	July 2	@ Phillies	1–0	Farnsworth (3–0)	Wendell (1–2)	Borowski (16)	23,591	43–40	
84	July 3	@ Phillies	12–2	Myers (8–6)	Zambrano (6–7)		57,326	43–41	
85	July 4	Cardinals	11–8	Tomko (5–5)	Wood (8–6)		39,756	43–42	
86	July 5	Cardinals	6–5	Remlinger (5–2)	Fassero (1–4)		38,953	44–42	
87	July 6	Cardinals	4–1	Williams (11–3)	Prior (8–4)	Isringhausen (3)	37,713	44–43	
88	July 7	Marlins	6–3	Clement (6–7)	Beckett (3–4)	Borowski (17)	38,662	45–43	
89	July 8	Marlins	4–3	Bump (2–0)	Remlinger (5–3)	Looper (16)	33,227	45–44	
90	July 9	Marlins	5–1	Wood (9–6)	Pavano (6–10)		33,054	46–44	
91	July 10	Braves	13–3	Maddux (7–8)	Estes (6–8)		38,756	46–45	
92	July 11	Braves	9–5	Hampton (5–5)	Prior (8–5)		39,334	46–46	
93	July 12	Braves	7–3	Clement (7–7)	Ramírez (8–3)		39,980	47–46	
94	July 13	Braves	7–2	Reynolds (7–4)	Zambrano (6–8)		39,832	47–47	
95	July 18	@ Marlins	6–0	Redman (8–4)	Clement (7–8)		26,174	47–48	
96	July 19	@ Marlins	1–0	Wood (10–6)	Penny (8–7)		30,432	48–48	
97	July 20	@ Marlins	16–2	Zambrano (7–8)	Willis (9–2)		25,574	49–48	
98	July 21	@ Braves	15–6	Veres (1–1)	Reynolds (7–5)		39,950	50–48	
99	July 22	@ Braves	8–4	Maddux (9–8)	Mitre (0–1)		39,226	50–49	
100	July 23	Phillies	3–0	Wolf (11–5)	Clement (7–9)		40,377	50–50	
101	July 24	Phillies	14–6	Padilla (9–8)	Wood (10–7)		40,266	50–51	
102	July 25	@ Astros	5–3	Zambrano (8–8)	Dotel (6–4)	Borowski (18)	43,013	51–51	
103	July 26	@ Astros	3–1	Redding (7–9)	Cruz (1–4)	Wagner (31)	42,679	51–52	
104	July 27	@ Astros	5–3	Estes (7–8)	Robertson (10–4)	Borowski (19)	42,422	52–52	
105	July 29	Giants	3–0	Clement (8–9)	Moss (9–7)		40,221	53–52	
106	July 30	Giants	6–3	Schmidt (11–4)	Wood (10–8)		39,973	53–53	
107	July 31	Giants	9–4	Zambrano (9–8)	Brower (7–3)		39,422	54–53	

August: 15–13

#	Date	Opponent	Score	Win	Loss	Save	Attendance	Record	Box
108	August 1	D-backs	4–3 (14)	Alfonseca (1–1)	Oropesa (2–2)		38,738	55–53	
109	August 2	D-backs	4–3	Villarreal (7–4)	Borowski (1–2)	Mantei (12)	40,304	55–54	
110	August 3	D-backs	2–1	Clement (9–9)	Villarreal (7–5)	Veres (1)	39,473	56–54	
111	August 5	@ Padres	3–0	Prior (9–5)	Lawrence (5–14)	Borowski (20)	30,932	57–54	
112	August 6	@ Padres	3–2	Wood (11–8)	Eaton (6–8)	Borowski (21)	29,265	58–54	
113	August 7	@ Padres	9–3	Zambrano (10–8)	Jarvis (4–4)		27,673	59–54	
114	August 8	@ Dodgers	3–1	Ashby (3–9)	Estes (7–9)	Gagné (31)	52,911	59–55	
115	August 9	@ Dodgers	6–1	Álvarez (2–1)	Clement (9–10)		54,181	59–56	
116	August 10	@ Dodgers	3–1	Prior (10–5)	Brown (11–6)		51,729	60–56	
117	August 11	Astros	3–1	Miller (9–10)	Wood (11–9)	Wagner (34)	39,889	60–57	
118	August 12	Astros	3–0	Zambrano (11–8)	Redding (8–10)		39,751	61–57	
119	August 13	Astros	6–4	Guthrie (1–3)	Robertson (11–6)	Borowski (22)	39,631	62–57	
120	August 14	Astros	7–1	Clement (10–10)	Fernandez (1–2)		39,769	63–57	
121	August 15	Dodgers	2–1	Prior (11–5)	Kida (0–1)		40,188	64–57	
122	August 16	Dodgers	10–5	Pérez (9–9)	Remlinger (5–4)		40,032	64–58	
123	August 17	Dodgers	3–0	Nomo (14–9)	Zambrano (11–9)	Gagné (41)	40,124	64–59	
124	August 19	@ Astros	12–8	Miceli (2–3)	Clement (10–11)		32,707	64–60	
125	August 20	@ Astros	6–0	Prior (12–5)	Fernandez (1–3)		32,810	65–60	
126	August 21	@ Astros	9–3	Villone (5–2)	Wood (11–10)		29,555	65–60	
127	August 22	@ D-backs	4–1	Zambrano (12–9)	Schilling (7–7)		39,612	66–61	
128	August 23	@ D-backs	13–2	Batista (8–7)	Estes (7–10)		40,820	66–62	
129	August 24	@ D-backs	5–3	Clement (11–11)	Randolph (7–1)	Borowski (23)	40,129	67–62	
130	August 26	@ Cardinals	7–4	Prior (13–5)	Stephenson (7–13)		36,563	68–62	
131	August 27	@ Cardinals	4–2	Kline (5–5)	Farnsworth (3–1)	Isringhausen (15)	32,667	68–63	
132	August 28	@ Cardinals	3–2	DeJean (5–7)	Remlinger (5–5)		37,370	68–64	
133	August 29	Brewers	4–2	Clement (12–11)	Sheets (10–11)		38,215	69–64	
134	August 30	Brewers	9–5	Kinney (10–9)	Estes (7–11)		39,805	69–65	
135	August 31	Brewers	2–0	Davis (6–6)	Cruz (1–5)	Kolb (14)	38,946	69–66	

September: 19–8

#	Date	Opponent	Score	Win	Loss	Save	Attendance	Record	Box
136	September 1	Cardinals	7–0	Prior (14–5)	Williams (14–7)		38,410	70–66	
137	September 2	Cardinals	4–2 (15)	Guthrie (2–3)	Fassero (1–7)		31,990	71–66	
138	September 2	Cardinals	2–0	Morris (9–6)	Wood (11–11)	Isringhausen (17)	39,290	71–67	
139	September 3	Cardinals	8–7	Borowski (2–2)	Williams (14–8)		32,710	72–67	
140	September 4	Cardinals	7–6	Remlinger (6–5)	DeJean (5–8)	Borowski (24)	35,129	73–67	
141	September 5	@ Brewers	4–2	Cruz (2–5)	Sheets (10–12)	Borowski (25)	42,909	74–67	
142	September 6	@ Brewers	8–4	Prior (15–5)	Kinney (10–10)		46,218	75–67	
143	September 7	@ Brewers	9–2	Wood (12–11)	Davis (6–7)		42,127	76–67	
144	September 9	@ Expos	4–3	Zambrano (13–9)	Day (7–7)	Borowski (26)	15,632	77–67	
145	September 10	@ Expos	8–4	Ayala (9–3)	Farnsworth (3–2)		18,002	77–68	
146	September 11	@ Expos	3–2	Ohka (9–12)	Prior (15–6)	Eischen (1)	12,559	77–69	
147	September 12	Reds	7–6	Alfonseca (2–1)	Randall (2–2)	Borowski (27)	38,219	78–69	
148	September 13	Reds	9–6	Alfonseca (3–1)	Belisle (1–1)	Borowski (28)	39,983	79–69	
149	September 14	Reds	1–0	Riedling (2–3)	Zambrano (13–10)	Reitsma (9)	38,827	79–70	
150	September 15	Mets	4–1	Clement (13–11)	Griffiths (1–3)	Borowski (29)	38,698	80–70	
151	September 16	Mets	3–2	Prior (16–6)	Seo (8–12)	Borowski (30)	39,534	81–70	
152	September 17	Mets	2–0	Wood (13–11)	Leiter (14–9)		38,482	82–70	
153	September 19	@ Pirates	10–9	Veres (2–1)	Figueroa (2–1)	Borowski (31)		83–70	
154	September 19	@ Pirates	10–6	Torres (6–5)	Cruz (2–6)		16,248	83–71	
155	September 20	@ Pirates	8–2	Vogelsong (2–1)	Clement (13–12)		32,869	83–72	
156	September 21	@ Pirates	4–1	Prior (17–6)	Pérez (4–10)	Borowski (32)	21,497	84–72	
157	September 23	@ Reds	6–0	Wood (14–11)	Randall (2–4)		26,124	85–72	
158	September 24	@ Reds	8–0	Estes (8–11)	Hall (0–2)		27,021	86–72	
159	September 25	@ Reds	9–7	Van Poppel (3–1)	Zambrano (13–11)	Reitsma (12)	36,963	86–73	
–	September 26	Pirates	Postponed (rain) Rescheduled for September 27						
160	September 27	Pirates	4–2	Prior (18–6)	Fogg (10–9)	Borowski (33)		87–73	
161	September 27	Pirates	7–2	Clement (14–12)	Vogelsong (2–2)		40,121	88–73	
162	September 28	Pirates	3–2	Wells (10–9)	Cruz (2–7)	Tavárez (11)	39,940	88–74	

== Player stats ==
=== Batting ===
Note: G = Games played; AB = At bats; R = Runs; H = Hits; 2B = Doubles; 3B = Triples; HR = Home runs; RBI = Runs batted in; Avg. = Batting average; OBP = On base percentage; SLG = Slugging percentage; SB = Stolen bases

Player	G	AB	R	H	2B	3B	HR	RBI	AVG	OBP	SLG	SB
Moises Alou	151	565	83	158	35	1	22	91	.280	.357	.462	3
Paul Bako	70	188	19	43	13	3	0	17	.229	.311	.330	0
Mark Bellhorn	51	139	15	29	7	1	2	22	.209	.341	.317	3
Alan Benes	3	1	0	0	0	0	0	0	.000	.000	.000	0
Hee-Seop Choi	80	202	31	44	17	0	8	28	.218	.350	.421	1
Matt Clement	32	62	3	9	2	0	0	3	.145	.159	.177	0
Juan Cruz	25	12	1	3	0	1	0	1	.250	.250	.417	0
Shawn Estes	30	39	4	7	1	0	1	3	.179	.214	.282	0
Kyle Farnsworth	1	0	0	0	0	0	0	0	.000	.000	.000	0
Doug Glanville	28	51	2	12	0	0	1	2	.235	.259	.294	0
Alex Gonzalez	152	536	71	122	37	0	20	59	.228	.295	.406	3
Tom Goodwin	87	171	26	49	10	0	1	12	.287	.328	.363	19
Mark Grudzielanek	121	481	73	151	38	1	3	38	.314	.366	.416	6
Mark Guthrie	65	1	0	0	0	0	0	0	.000	.000	.000	0
Lenny Harris	75	131	11	24	3	0	1	7	.183	.255	.229	1
José Hernández	23	69	6	13	3	1	2	9	.188	.222	.348	0
Bobby Hill	5	4	0	1	0	0	0	0	.250	.400	.250	0
Trent Hubbard	10	16	2	4	1	0	0	2	.250	.429	.313	1
Eric Karros	114	336	37	96	16	1	12	40	.286	.340	.446	1
David Kelton	10	12	1	2	1	0	0	1	.167	.167	.250	0
Kenny Lofton	56	208	39	68	13	4	3	20	.327	.381	.471	12
Ramón Martínez	108	293	30	83	16	1	3	34	.283	.333	.375	0
Damian Miller	114	352	34	82	19	1	9	36	.233	.310	.369	1
Sergio Mitre	3	2	1	1	0	0	0	0	.500	.500	.500	0
Troy O'Leary	93	174	18	38	9	0	5	28	.218	.275	.356	3
Augie Ojeda	12	25	2	3	0	0	0	0	.120	.185	.120	0
Corey Patterson	83	329	49	98	17	7	13	55	.298	.329	.511	16
Josh Paul	3	6	0	0	0	0	0	0	.000	.000	.000	0
Mark Prior	32	72	6	18	4	0	1	6	.250	.270	.347	0
Aramis Ramírez	63	232	31	60	7	1	15	39	.259	.314	.491	1
Mike Remlinger	73	1	0	0	0	0	0	0	.000	.000	.000	0
Randall Simon	33	103	13	29	3	0	6	21	.282	.318	.485	0
Sammy Sosa	137	517	99	144	22	0	40	103	.279	.358	.553	0
Todd Wellemeyer	15	1	0	0	0	0	0	0	.000	.500	.000	0
Tony Womack	21	51	4	12	2	1	0	2	.235	.250	.314	2
Kerry Wood	32	61	4	10	1	0	2	6	.164	.177	.279	0
Carlos Zambrano	32	75	9	18	5	0	2	6	.240	.250	.387	0
Team totals	162	5519	724	1431	302	24	172	691	.259	.323	.416	73

=== Pitching ===
Note: W = Wins; L = Losses; ERA = Earned run average; G = Games pitched; GS = Games started; SV = Saves; IP = Innings pitched; H = Hits allowed; R = Runs allowed; ER = Earned runs allowed; BB = Walks allowed; K = Strikeouts

Player	W	L	ERA	G	GS	SV	IP	H	R	ER	BB	K
Antonio Alfonseca	3	1	5.83	60	0	0	66.1	76	43	43	27	51
Alan Benes	0	0	2.16	3	0	1	8.1	8	2	2	6	9
Joe Borowski	2	2	2.63	68	0	33	68.1	53	23	20	19	66
Matt Clement	14	12	4.11	32	32	0	201.2	169	100	92	79	171
Juan Cruz	2	7	6.05	25	6	0	61.0	66	44	41	28	65
Shawn Estes	8	11	5.73	29	28	0	152.1	182	113	97	83	103
Kyle Farnsworth	3	2	3.30	77	0	0	76.1	53	31	28	36	92
Mark Guthrie	2	3	2.74	65	0	0	42.2	40	14	13	22	24
Sergio Mitre	0	1	8.31	3	2	0	8.2	15	8	8	4	3
Phil Norton	0	0	5.40	4	0	0	3.1	2	2	2	3	0
Mark Prior	18	6	2.43	30	30	0	211.1	183	67	57	50	245
Mike Remlinger	6	5	3.65	73	0	0	69.0	54	30	28	39	83
Félix Sánchez	0	0	10.80	3	0	0	1.2	2	2	2	3	2
Dave Veres	2	1	4.68	31	0	1	32.2	36	17	17	5	26
Todd Wellemeyer	1	1	6.51	15	0	1	27.2	25	22	20	19	30
Kerry Wood	14	11	3.20	32	32	0	211.0	152	77	75	100	266
Carlos Zambrano	13	11	3.11	32	32	0	214.0	188	88	74	94	168
Team totals	88	74	3.83	162	162	36	1456.1	1304	683	619	617	1404

== Postseason ==
=== 2003 NLDS ===
Atlanta Braves vs. Chicago Cubs

==== Game 5 – Chicago 5, Atlanta 1 ====
Team	1	2	3	4	5	6	7	8	9	R	H	E
Chicago	1	1	0	0	0	2	0	0	1	5	9	0
Atlanta	0	0	0	0	0	1	0	0	0	1	5	1
WP: Kerry Wood (2–0) LP: Mike Hampton (0–1); Home runs: CHC: Alex S. Gonzalez (1), Aramis Ramírez (1); ATL: None

For the first time since October 14. 1908, the Cubs had won a postseason series, doing so at Turner Field in Atlanta.

=== 2003 NLCS ===
==== Game 1 ====
October 7: Wrigley Field, Chicago

Team	1	2	3	4	5	6	7	8	9	10	11	R	H	E
Florida	0	0	5	0	0	1	0	0	2	0	1	9	14	1
Chicago	4	0	0	0	0	2	0	0	2	0	0	8	11	1
WP: Ugueth Urbina (1-0) LP: Mark Guthrie (0-1) Sv: Braden Looper (1); Home runs: Fla: I. Rodríguez (1), M. Cabrera (1), J. Encarnación (1), M. Lowell (1); ChC: M. Alou (1), A. Gonzalez (1), S. Sosa (1)

==== Game 2 ====
October 8: Wrigley Field, Chicago

Team	1	2	3	4	5	6	7	8	9	R	H	E
Florida	0	0	0	0	0	2	0	1	0	3	9	1
Chicago	2	3	3	0	3	1	0	0	X	12	16	1
WP: Mark Prior (1-0) LP: Brad Penny (0-1); Home runs: Fla: D. Lee (1), M. Cabrera (2); ChC: S. Sosa (2), A. Ramírez (1), A. Gonzalez 2 (3)

==== Game 3 ====
October 10: Pro Player Stadium, Miami, Florida

Team	1	2	3	4	5	6	7	8	9	10	11	R	H	E
Chicago	1	1	0	0	0	0	0	2	0	0	1	5	12	0
Florida	0	1	0	0	0	0	2	1	0	0	0	4	10	0
WP: Joe Borowski (1-0) LP: Michael Tejera (0-1) Sv: Mike Remlinger (1); Home runs: ChC: Randall Simon (1); Fla: None

==== Game 4 ====
October 11: Pro Player Stadium, Miami

Team	1	2	3	4	5	6	7	8	9	R	H	E
Chicago	4	0	2	1	0	0	1	0	0	8	8	0
Florida	0	0	0	0	2	0	0	1	0	3	9	0
WP: Matt Clement (1-0) LP: Dontrelle Willis (0-1); Home runs: ChC: Aramis Ramírez (2); Fla: None

==== Game 5 ====
October 12: Pro Player Stadium, Miami

With the Marlins facing elimination, Josh Beckett kept them alive by dominating the Cubs, holding them to just two hits and one walk as part of his standout 2003 postseason. The game was scoreless until the sixth inning when Mike Lowell hit a two-run homer. Iván Rodríguez and Jeff Conine homered in the seventh and eighth innings respectively. Even with the loss, the Cubs looked good going back home with their two aces, Mark Prior and Kerry Wood ready to start Games 6 and 7.

Team	1	2	3	4	5	6	7	8	9	R	H	E
Chicago	0	0	0	0	0	0	0	0	0	0	2	0
Florida	0	0	0	0	2	0	1	1	X	4	8	0
WP: Josh Beckett (1-0) LP: Carlos Zambrano (0-1); Home runs: ChC: None; Fla: Mike Lowell (2), Iván Rodríguez (2), Jeff Conine (1)

==== Game 6 ====
October 14: Wrigley Field, Chicago, Illinois

The Cubs were 5 outs from reaching the World Series and 5 wins away from winning the World Series in 2003

The Cubs held a 3–0 lead going into the top of the eighth inning in Game 6 and, after Mike Mordecai hit a high pop fly to left field for the first out of the inning, had only two outs left in the inning—leaving the team a mere 5 outs away from their first World Series berth since 1945.

Prior had retired the last eight hitters and had allowed only three hits up to that point. Center fielder Juan Pierre (who was later traded to the Cubs) then hit a double off Prior.

On the eighth pitch of his at bat, Luis Castillo hit a high foul ball toward the left field wall. Cubs left fielder Moisés Alou headed toward the stands to catch the ball for the potential second out. As Alou reached for the ball, Cubs fan Steve Bartman, along with others near the area, did the same. The ball bounced off Bartman's hand and into the stands. Though the Cubs pleaded for a call of fan interference, the umpire ruled that the ball had left the field of play and was therefore up for grabs. Alou initially said that he would not have made the catch, though he later denied making the statement, saying that if he had, it was only to make Bartman feel better.

As a result, Castillo remained an active batter at home plate. On the next pitch, Prior walked Castillo on a wild pitch that got away from catcher Paul Bako, also allowing Pierre to advance to third base.

Next, Iván Rodríguez hit an 0-2 pitch hard into left field, singling and scoring Pierre. Miguel Cabrera then hit a ground ball toward Cubs shortstop Alex Gonzalez that could have ended the inning on a double play. Gonzalez, who led all NL shortstops in fielding percentage, closed his glove a little too early and the ball landed in the dirt, allowing Cabrera to get on base, loading the bases. On the next pitch, Derrek Lee (a future Cubs' All-Star) drilled a double into left field, scoring Castillo and Rodríguez to tie the game at 3-3.

Prior was then taken out of the game and replaced by Kyle Farnsworth, who intentionally walked Mike Lowell to load the bases. Jeff Conine then hit a sacrifice fly to right field for the second out of the inning, allowing Cabrera to score from third and the other runners to each advance one base. This gave the Marlins their first lead of the night. Farnsworth intentionally walked Todd Hollandsworth (another future Cub) to once again load the bases.

The Marlins now having batted around the order, Farnsworth faced Mike Mordecai, who was looking to make up for his earlier out. This time, Mordecai prevailed, hitting a bases-clearing double to left-center field, allowing Lee, Lowell and Hollandsworth to score and making it a 7-3 Marlins lead.

Farnsworth was then taken out of the game and replaced by Mike Remlinger, who gave up a single to Pierre to score Mordecai from second base. Finally, Luis Castillo hit a high pop fly ball to shallow right field for the third out.

The Marlins' lead held, forcing a final Game 7.

Team	1	2	3	4	5	6	7	8	9	R	H	E
Florida	0	0	0	0	0	0	0	8	0	8	9	0
Chicago	1	0	0	0	0	1	1	0	0	3	10	2
WP: Chad Fox (1-0) LP: Mark Prior (1-1)

==== Game 7 ====
October 15: Wrigley Field, Chicago, Illinois

The Marlins got off to a quick 3–0 lead in the first inning against Cubs pitching ace Kerry Wood, who hadn't lost at Wrigley Field in nearly six weeks. The Cubs responded by tying the ball game 3–3 in the second inning, which featured a two-run home run by Wood. Moisés Alou's two-run home run the following inning put Chicago up 5–3, but the lead wouldn't last. In the fifth inning, Florida capitalized on a pair of walks and scored three runs to go on top 6–5, a lead they would not relinquish. The Marlins added a run in the sixth and two more in the seventh to expand their lead to 9–5. Cubs pinch-hitter Troy O'Leary hit a home run the bottom of the seventh, making the score 9–6. After the Cubs were retired in order in the eighth inning, Florida closer Ugueth Urbina hit Aramis Ramírez with a pitch to lead off the ninth inning and proceeded to retire the following three batters, giving the Marlins their second National League pennant in their eleven-year existence.

Team	1	2	3	4	5	6	7	8	9	R	H	E
Florida	3	0	0	0	3	1	2	0	0	9	12	0
Chicago	0	3	2	0	0	0	1	0	0	6	9	0
WP: Brad Penny (1-1) LP: Kerry Wood (0-1) Sv: Ugueth Urbina (1); Home runs: Fla: Miguel Cabrera (3); ChC: Kerry Wood (1), Moisés Alou (2), Troy O'Leary (1)

== Farm system ==
Level	Team	League	Manager
AAA	Iowa Cubs	Pacific Coast League	Mike Quade
AA	West Tenn Diamond Jaxx	Southern League	Bobby Dickerson
A	Daytona Cubs	Florida State League	Rick Kranitz
A	Lansing Lugnuts	Midwest League	Julio Garcia
A-Short Season	Boise Hawks	Northwest League	Steve McFarland
Rookie	AZL Cubs	Arizona League	Carmelo Martínez

LEAGUE CHAMPIONS: Lansing
