= 2003 Atlanta Braves season =

2003 Atlanta Braves
- National League East champions
- League: National League
- Division: East
- Ballpark: Turner Field
- City: Atlanta
- Record: 101–61 (.623)
- Divisional place: 1st
- Owners: AOL Time Warner
- General managers: John Schuerholz
- Managers: Bobby Cox
- Television: TBS Superstation (Don Sutton, Joe Simpson); Turner South (Pete Van Wieren); FSN South (Tom Paciorek, Bob Rathbun)
- Radio: WSB (AM) (Pete Van Wieren, Skip Caray); WWWE (Luis Octavio Dozal, Jose Manuel Flores)

The 2003 Atlanta Braves season marked the franchise's 38th season in Atlanta and 133rd overall. The Braves won their ninth consecutive division title, finishing 10 games ahead of the second-place Florida Marlins. The Braves lost the NLDS to the Chicago Cubs, 3–2. The Braves finished 2003 with their best offensive season up to that point in franchise history, hitting a franchise record 235 home runs. Atlanta also had one of the most noteworthy combined offensive outfield productions in league history.

The Braves' starting rotation had new faces in 2003, but aged pitchers. Opposite of what they were traditionally known for in years earlier. Greg Maddux was joined by trade acquisitions Mike Hampton and Russ Ortiz, free agent Shane Reynolds and rookie Horacio Ramírez. Critics noted had Atlanta had a younger staff with this offense, they would've been more likely to win the World Series. Marcus Giles had an All-Star season as the Braves' second baseman and Gary Sheffield as the Braves' right fielder. Sheffield finished with a top 5 voting in NL MVP voting. 2003 also marked the last season for Maddux, ending his tenure in Atlanta after 11 seasons.

== Offseason ==
- November 18, 2002: Mike Hampton was traded by the Florida Marlins with cash to the Atlanta Braves for Ryan Baker (minors) and Tim Spooneybarger. (Hampton had been traded to the Marlins from the Colorado Rockies on November 16, 2002)
- November 20, 2002: Donzell McDonald was signed as a free agent with the Atlanta Braves.
- December 16, 2002: Ray King was traded by the Milwaukee Brewers to the Atlanta Braves for John Foster and Wes Helms.
- December 17, 2002: Russ Ortiz was traded by the San Francisco Giants to the Atlanta Braves for Damian Moss and Merkin Valdez.
- December 18, 2002: Paul Byrd was signed as a free agent with the Atlanta Braves. (Byrd did not play for the Braves in 2003)
- December 19, 2002: Greg Maddux was signed as a free agent with the Atlanta Braves.
- December 20, 2002: Johnny Estrada was traded by the Philadelphia Phillies to the Atlanta Braves for Kevin Millwood.
- January 6, 2003: Robert Fick signed as a free agent with the Atlanta Braves.
- January 8, 2003: Julio Franco was signed as a free agent with the Atlanta Braves.
- January 23, 2003: Roberto Hernandez signed as a free agent with the Atlanta Braves.
- April 10, 2003: Shane Reynolds signed as a free agent with the Atlanta Braves.

== Regular season ==
- In 2003, John Smoltz set a Major League record (since tied) by having 34 saves before the All-Star Break.
- May 23, 2003 – During the Atlanta Braves 15-3 victory over the Cincinnati Reds, Braves players Rafael Furcal, Mark DeRosa and Gary Sheffield hit consecutive home runs to start the game.
- On August 10, 2003, Rafael Furcal of the Braves had an unassisted triple play. He caught the liner, touched second base, and tagged the runner going back to first base.

=== Opening Day starters ===
| Position | Name |
|---|---|
| Starting Pitcher | Greg Maddux |
| Catcher | Henry Blanco |
| First Baseman | Robert Fick |
| Second Baseman | Marcus Giles |
| Third Baseman | Vinny Castilla |
| Shortstop | Rafael Furcal |
| Left Fielder | Chipper Jones |
| Center Fielder | Andruw Jones |
| Right Fielder | Gary Sheffield |

=== Season standings ===
==== National League East ====
NL East
| Team | W | L | Pct. | GB | Home | Road |
|---|---|---|---|---|---|---|
| Atlanta Braves | 101 | 61 | .623 | — | 55‍–‍26 | 46‍–‍35 |
| Florida Marlins | 91 | 71 | .562 | 10 | 53‍–‍28 | 38‍–‍43 |
| Philadelphia Phillies | 86 | 76 | .531 | 15 | 49‍–‍32 | 37‍–‍44 |
| Montreal Expos | 83 | 79 | .512 | 18 | 52‍–‍29 | 31‍–‍50 |
| New York Mets | 66 | 95 | .410 | 34½ | 34‍–‍46 | 32‍–‍49 |

==== Record vs. opponents ====
2003 National League record Source: MLB Standings Grid – 2003
| Team | AZ | ATL | CHC | CIN | COL | FLA | HOU | LAD | MIL | MON | NYM | PHI | PIT | SD | SF | STL | AL |
|---|---|---|---|---|---|---|---|---|---|---|---|---|---|---|---|---|---|
| Arizona | — | 2–5 | 2–4 | 7–2 | 10–9 | 2–5 | 5–1 | 10–9 | 3–3 | 4–2 | 4–2 | 4–2 | 3–3 | 9–10 | 5–14 | 3–3 | 11–4 |
| Atlanta | 5–2 | — | 4–2 | 3–3 | 6–0 | 9–10 | 5–1 | 4–2 | 4–2 | 12–7 | 11–8 | 9–10 | 7–2 | 6–1 | 2–4 | 4–2 | 10–5 |
| Chicago | 4–2 | 2–4 | — | 10–7 | 3–3 | 4–2 | 9–7 | 2–4 | 10–6 | 3–3 | 5–1 | 1–5 | 10–8 | 4–2 | 4–2 | 8–9 | 9–9 |
| Cincinnati | 2–7 | 3–3 | 7–10 | — | 4–2 | 2–4 | 5–12 | 2–4 | 8–10 | 2–4 | 2–4 | 5–4 | 5–11 | 3–3 | 3–3 | 9–7 | 7–5 |
| Colorado | 9–10 | 0–6 | 3–3 | 2–4 | — | 4–2 | 2–4 | 7–12 | 5–1 | 3–4 | 2–5 | 2–4 | 3–6 | 12–7 | 7–12 | 4–2 | 9–6 |
| Florida | 5–2 | 10–9 | 2–4 | 4–2 | 2–4 | — | 1–5 | 2–5 | 7–2 | 13–6 | 12–7 | 13–6 | 2–4 | 5–1 | 1–5 | 3–3 | 9–6 |
| Houston | 1–5 | 1–5 | 7–9 | 12–5 | 4–2 | 5–1 | — | 4–2 | 9–8 | 3–3 | 2–4 | 2–4 | 10–6 | 3–3 | 2–4 | 11–7 | 11–7 |
| Los Angeles | 9–10 | 2–4 | 4–2 | 4–2 | 12–7 | 5–2 | 2–4 | — | 4–2 | 4–2 | 3–3 | 2–5 | 5–1 | 8–11 | 6–13 | 4–2 | 11–7 |
| Milwaukee | 3–3 | 2–4 | 6–10 | 10–8 | 1–5 | 2–7 | 8–9 | 2–4 | — | 0–6 | 6–3 | 4–2 | 10–7 | 5–1 | 1–5 | 3–13 | 5–7 |
| Montreal | 2–4 | 7–12 | 3–3 | 4–2 | 4–3 | 6–13 | 3–3 | 2–4 | 6–0 | — | 14–5 | 8–11 | 3–3 | 4–2 | 7–0 | 1–5 | 9–9 |
| New York | 2–4 | 8–11 | 1–5 | 4–2 | 5–2 | 7–12 | 4–2 | 3–3 | 3–6 | 5–14 | — | 7–12 | 4–2 | 3–3 | 4–2 | 1–5 | 5–10 |
| Philadelphia | 2–4 | 10–9 | 5–1 | 4–5 | 4–2 | 6–13 | 4–2 | 5–2 | 2–4 | 11–8 | 12–7 | — | 2–4 | 4–3 | 3–3 | 4–2 | 8–7 |
| Pittsburgh | 3–3 | 2–7 | 8–10 | 11–5 | 6–3 | 4–2 | 6–10 | 1–5 | 7–10 | 3–3 | 2–4 | 4–2 | — | 4–2 | 2–4 | 7–10 | 5–7 |
| San Diego | 10–9 | 1–6 | 2–4 | 3–3 | 7–12 | 1–5 | 3–3 | 11–8 | 1–5 | 2–4 | 3–3 | 3–4 | 2–4 | — | 5–14 | 2–4 | 8–10 |
| San Francisco | 14–5 | 4–2 | 2–4 | 3–3 | 12–7 | 5–1 | 4–2 | 13–6 | 5–1 | 0–7 | 2–4 | 3–3 | 4–2 | 14–5 | — | 5–1 | 10–8 |
| St. Louis | 3–3 | 2–4 | 9–8 | 7–9 | 2–4 | 3–3 | 7–11 | 2–4 | 13–3 | 5–1 | 5–1 | 2–4 | 10–7 | 4–2 | 1–5 | — | 10–8 |

=== Notable transactions ===
- August 29, 2003: Jaret Wright was selected off waivers by the Atlanta Braves from the San Diego Padres.
- Notable draft signings in 2003 include Jarrod Saltalamacchia (36th overall) and Jonny Venters (30th round).

=== Roster ===
2003 Atlanta Braves
**Roster**
| **Pitchers**: 51 Jung Bong; 26 Will Cunnane; 43 Joey Dawley; 49 Kevin Gryboski; 32 Mike Hampton; 34 Roberto Hernández; 45 Trey Hodges; 40 Darren Holmes; 46 Ray King; 31 Greg Maddux; 38 Jason Marquis; 50 Kent Mercker; 48 Russ Ortiz; 30 Horacio Ramírez; 37 Shane Reynolds; 29 John Smoltz; 27 Jaret Wright | **Catchers**: 20 Henry Blanco; 23 Johnny Estrada; 8 Javy López; **Infielders**: 19 Vinny Castilla; 5 Robert Fick; 14 Julio Franco; 1 Rafael Furcal; 2 Jesse Garcia; 22 Marcus Giles | **Outfielders**: 28 Darren Bragg; 12 Mike Hessman; 25 Andruw Jones; 10 Chipper Jones; 18 Ryan Langerhans; 11 Gary Sheffield; **Other batters**: 16 Mark DeRosa; 4 Matt Franco | **Manager**: 6 Bobby Cox; **Coaches**: 39 Pat Corrales (bench); 52 Bobby Dews (bullpen); 33 Fredi González (third base); 17 Glenn Hubbard (first base); 54 Leo Mazzone (pitching); 9 Terry Pendleton (hitting) |

=== Game log ===
2003 Game Log: 101–61 (Home: 55–26; Away: 46–35)
March/April: 17–10 (Home: 10–6; Away: 7–4)

| # | Date | Opponent | Score | Win | Loss | Save | Attendance | Record |
|---|---|---|---|---|---|---|---|---|
| 1 | March 31 | Expos | 2–10 | Armas (1–0) | **Maddux** (0–1) | — | 40,258 | 0–1 |
| 2 | April 2 | Expos | 0–3 | Day (1–0) | **Ramirez** (0–1) | Biddle (1) | 19,116 | 0–2 |
| 3 | April 3 | Expos | 0–4 | Vazquez (1–0) | **Ortiz** (0–1) | — | 19,505 | 0–3 |
| 4 | April 4 | Marlins | 12–7 | **Hernandez** (1–0) | Nunez (0–1) | **Smoltz** (1) | 20,642 | 1–3 |
| 5 | April 5 | Marlins | 1–17 | Beckett (1–1) | **Maddux** (0–2) | — | 23,081 | 1–4 |
| 6 | April 6 | Marlins | 13–4 | **Ramirez** (1–1) | Penny (0–1) | — | 21,253 | 2–4 |
| 7 | April 7 | Marlins | 3–0 | **Ortiz** (1–1) | Pavano (0–2) | **Smoltz** (2) | 19,326 | 3–4 |
| 8 | April 8 | @ Phillies | 3–4 (10) | Mesa (1–0) | **Gryboski** (0–1) | — | 13,283 | 3–5 |
| 9 | April 9 | @ Phillies | 2–16 | Padilla (1–1) | **Maddux** (0–3) | — | 14,724 | 3–6 |
| 10 | April 10 | @ Phillies | 6–2 | **Holmes** (1–0) | Roa (0–2) | — | 14,840 | 4–6 |
| 11 | April 11 | @ Marlins | 4–7 | Penny (1–1) | **Ramirez** (1–2) | Looper (1) | 12,045 | 4–7 |
| 12 | April 12 | @ Marlins | 5–12 | Pavano (1–2) | **Ortiz** (1–2) | — | 25,203 | 4–8 |
| 13 | April 13 | @ Marlins | 7–1 | **Maddux** (1–3) | Redman (1–2) | **Smoltz** (3) | 21,834 | 5–8 |
| 14 | April 15 | @ Expos* | 2–1 (10) | **Bong** (1–0) | Smith (1–1) | **Smoltz** (4) | 13,399 | 6–8 |
| 15 | April 16 | @ Expos* | 3–2 | **Ramirez** (2–2) | Ohka (1–2) | **Smoltz** (5) | 15,571 | 7–8 |
| 16 | April 17 | @ Expos* | 14–8 (10) | **Bong** (2–0) | Biddle (1–1) | — | 13,170 | 8–8 |
| 17 | April 18 | Phillies | 5–4 | **Gryboski** (1–1) | Wolf (2–1) | **Smoltz** (6) | 28,100 | 9–8 |
| 18 | April 19 | Phillies | 0–4 | Padilla (3–1) | **Hampton** (0–1) | — | 29,777 | 9–9 |
| 19 | April 20 | Phillies | 8–1 | **Reynolds** (1–0) | Duckworth (0–1) | — | 22,978 | 10–9 |
| 20 | April 22 | Cardinals | 5–3 | **Ortiz** (2–2) | Stephenson (1–2) | **Smoltz** (7) | 20,969 | 11–9 |
| 21 | April 23 | Cardinals | 4–2 | **Maddux** (2–3) | Morris (1–2) | **Smoltz** (8) | 21,338 | 12–9 |
| 22 | April 24 | Cardinals | 4–3 | **King** (1–0) | Kline (0–2) | — | 24,184 | 13–9 |
| 23 | April 25 | Brewers | 5–12 | Sheets (2–2) | **Reynolds** (1–1) | — | 21,938 | 13–10 |
| 24 | April 26 | Brewers | 3–2 | **King** (2–0) | de los Santos (0–2) | **Smoltz** (9) | 27,313 | 14–10 |
| 25 | April 27 | Brewers | 7–1 | **Ortiz** (3–2) | Rusch (1–4) | — | 26,349 | 15–10 |
| 26 | April 29 | @ Astros | 3–1 | **Maddux** (3–3) | Oswalt (2–3) | **Smoltz** (10) | 28,467 | 16–10 |
| 27 | April 30 | @ Astros | 11–1 | **Hampton** (1–1) | Miller (0–3) | — | 24,018 | 17–10 |
*Games the Montreal Expos played at Hiram Bithorn Stadium in San Juan, Puerto Rico, during the 2003 season counted as Expos home games.

May: 20–8 (Home: 9–3; Away: 11–5)

| # | Date | Opponent | Score | Win | Loss | Save | Attendance | Record |
|---|---|---|---|---|---|---|---|---|
| 28 | May 1 | @ Astros | 8–7 | **Hernandez** (2–0) | Wagner (1–2) | **Smoltz** (11) | 24,673 | 18–10 |
| 29 | May 2 | @ Diamondbacks | 4–2 (11) | **Bong** (3–0) | Mantei (3–1) | — | 38,287 | 19–10 |
| 30 | May 3 | @ Diamondbacks | 6–7 | Villarreal (2–2) | **Gryboski** (1–2) | Mantei (5) | 44,398 | 19–11 |
| 31 | May 4 | @ Diamondbacks | 7–4 (11) | **Hodges** (1–0) | Capuano (0–1) | **Smoltz** (12) | 38,851 | 20–11 |
| 32 | May 6 | Rockies | 3–2 | **Hernandez** (3–0) | Jones (0–1) | **Smoltz** (13) | 18,108 | 21–11 |
| – | May 7 | Rockies | Postponed (rain); rescheduled for May 8 | | | | | |
| 33 | May 8 (1) | Rockies | 12–6 | **Reynolds** (2–1) | Cruz (3–3) | **Smoltz** (14) | N/A | 22–11 |
| 34 | May 8 (2) | Rockies | 5–2 | **Ortiz** (4–2) | Chacon (4–2) | **Smoltz** (15) | 22,829 | 23–11 |
| 35 | May 9 | Giants | 2–9 | Foppert (2–2) | **Maddux** (3–4) | Brower (2) | 32,040 | 23–12 |
| 36 | May 10 | Giants | 6–3 | **Gryboski** (2–2) | Nathan (4–1) | — | 39,357 | 24–12 |
| 37 | May 11 | Giants | 7–3 | **Hampton** (2–1) | Schmidt (3–1) | — | 28,329 | 25–12 |
| 38 | May 12 | @ Dodgers | 11–4 | **Bong** (4–0) | Gagne (0–1) | — | 27,458 | 26–12 |
| 39 | May 13 | @ Dodgers | 3–1 | **Ortiz** (5–2) | Quantrill (0–2) | **Smoltz** (16) | 31,021 | 27–12 |
| 40 | May 14 | @ Dodgers | 1–5 | Brown (4–1) | **Maddux** (3–5) | — | 29,343 | 27–13 |
| 41 | May 15 | @ Padres | 15–6 | **Ramirez** (3–2) | Deago (0–1) | — | 15,818 | 28–13 |
| 42 | May 16 | @ Padres | 6–4 | **Gryboski** (3–2) | Nagy (0–1) | **Smoltz** (17) | 24,229 | 29–13 |
| 43 | May 17 | @ Padres | 12–2 | **Reynolds** (3–1) | Loewer (0–1) | — | 28,551 | 30–13 |
| 44 | May 18 | @ Padres | 6–3 | **Ortiz** (6–2) | Lawrence (2–5) | **Smoltz** (18) | 23,776 | 31–13 |
| 45 | May 20 | @ Reds | 8–9 | Sullivan (5–0) | **Hernandez** (3–1) | Williamson (11) | 24,076 | 31–14 |
| 46 | May 21 | @ Reds | 3–9 | Reitsma (3–1) | **Hampton** (2–2) | — | 33,355 | 31–15 |
| 47 | May 22 | @ Reds | 9–4 | **Reynolds** (4–1) | Dempster (1–4) | — | 28,962 | 32–15 |
| 48 | May 23 | Mets | 5–6 | Trachsel (3–2) | **Ortiz** (6–3) | Benitez (14) | 33,270 | 32–16 |
| 49 | May 24 | Mets | 10–4 | **Ramirez** (4–2) | Glavine (5–4) | — | 40,912 | 33–16 |
| 50 | May 25 | Mets | 3–1 | **Hernandez** (4–1) | Weathers (1–4) | **Smoltz** (19) | 41,432 | 34–16 |
| 51 | May 26 | Reds | 6–7 (11) | White (2–0) | **Hernandez** (4–2) | — | 33,455 | 34–17 |
| 52 | May 27 | Reds | 3–2 (10) | **Hodges** (2–0) | Reitsma (3–2) | — | 23,041 | 35–17 |
| 53 | May 28 | Reds | 15–3 | **Ortiz** (7–3) | Austin (2–3) | **Bong** (1) | 25,713 | 36–17 |
| 54 | May 30 | @ Mets | 5–2 | **Maddux** (4–5) | Glavine (5–5) | **Smoltz** (20) | 26,439 | 37–17 |
| 55 | May 31 | @ Mets | 2–4 | Seo (2–2) | **Hampton** (2–3) | Benitez (16) | 33,378 | 37–18 |

June: 14–11 (Home: 8–3; Away: 6–8)

| # | Date | Opponent | Score | Win | Loss | Save | Attendance | Record |
|---|---|---|---|---|---|---|---|---|
| 56 | June 1 | @ Mets | 4–10 | Leiter (6–2) | **Gryboski** (3–3) | — | 25,162 | 37–19 |
| 57 | June 3 | Rangers | 6–5 | **Gryboski** (4–3) | Urbina (0–2) | **Smoltz** (21) | 30,444 | 38–19 |
| 58 | June 4 | Rangers | 5–2 | **Maddux** (5–5) | Thomson (3–7) | **Smoltz** (22) | 30,836 | 39–19 |
| 59 | June 5 | Rangers | 8–4 | **Bong** (5–0) | Fultz (1–1) | — | 35,944 | 40–19 |
| – | June 6 | Pirates | Postponed (rain); rescheduled for September 5 | | | | | |
| 60 | June 7 | Pirates | 8–6 | **Hernandez** (5–2) | Boehringer (3–2) | **Smoltz** (23) | 35,397 | 41–19 |
| 61 | June 8 | Pirates | 6–5 | **Hodges** (3–0) | Fogg (2–3) | **Smoltz** (24) | 29,869 | 42–19 |
| 62 | June 10 | @ Athletics | 3–4 (12) | Bradford (5–3) | **Bong** (5–1) | — | 22,088 | 42–20 |
| 63 | June 11 | @ Athletics | 11–6 | **Ramirez** (5–2) | Lilly (3–5) | — | 35,618 | 43–20 |
| 64 | June 12 | @ Athletics | 4–2 | **Reynolds** (5–1) | Zito (7–5) | **Smoltz** (25) | 21,173 | 44–20 |
| 65 | June 13 | @ Mariners | 1–2 | Garcia (7–6) | **Ortiz** (7–4) | Nelson (4) | 45,791 | 44–21 |
| 66 | June 14 | @ Mariners | 3–1 | **Hampton** (3–3) | Moyer (10–3) | **Smoltz** (26) | 45,971 | 45–21 |
| 67 | June 15 | @ Mariners | 1–2 | Meche (9–3) | **Maddux** (5–6) | Nelson (5) | 45,732 | 45–22 |
| 68 | June 17 | @ Phillies | 4–5 | Wendell (1–1) | **Holmes** (1–1) | — | 24,133 | 45–23 |
| 69 | June 18 | @ Phillies | 6–1 | **Ortiz** (8–4) | Millwood (8–5) | — | 26,475 | 46–23 |
| 70 | June 19 | @ Phillies | 2–3 | Mesa (2–4) | **Smoltz** (0–1) | — | 27,207 | 46–24 |
| 71 | June 20 | Orioles | 6–3 | **Maddux** (6–6) | Ponson (9–4) | **Smoltz** (27) | 35,526 | 47–24 |
| 72 | June 21 | Orioles | 10–2 | **Ramirez** (6–2) | Lopez (1–4) | — | 46,860 | 48–24 |
| 73 | June 22 | Orioles | 3–9 | Johnson (6–3) | **Reynolds** (5–2) | Hentgen (1) | 34,904 | 48–25 |
| 74 | June 24 | Phillies | 5–3 | **Ortiz** (9–4) | Millwood (8–6) | **Smoltz** (28) | 31,796 | 49–25 |
| 75 | June 25 | Phillies | 1–8 | Padilla (6–7) | **Maddux** (6–7) | — | 31,724 | 49–26 |
| 76 | June 26 | Phillies | 1–8 | Wolf (9–3) | **Hampton** (3–4) | — | 30,405 | 49–27 |
| 77 | June 27 | @ Devil Rays | 8–2 | **Ramirez** (7–2) | Gonzalez (3–4) | — | 16,398 | 50–27 |
| 78 | June 28 | @ Devil Rays | 7–9 | Zambrano (5–4) | **Reynolds** (5–3) | Carter (13) | 26,696 | 50–28 |
| 79 | June 29 | @ Devil Rays | 2–0 | **Ortiz** (10–4) | Sosa (1–6) | **Smoltz** (29) | 22,670 | 51–28 |
| 80 | June 30 | @ Marlins | 1–8 | Redman (6–3) | **Maddux** (6–8) | — | 11,254 | 51–29 |

July: 20–8 (Home: 11–4; Away: 9–4)

| # | Date | Opponent | Score | Win | Loss | Save | Attendance | Record |
|---|---|---|---|---|---|---|---|---|
| 81 | July 1 | @ Marlins | 1–20 | Beckett (3–3) | **Hampton** (3–5) | — | 13,073 | 51–30 |
| 82 | July 2 | @ Marlins | 2–1 (13) | **Gryboski** (5–3) | Almanza (4–5) | **Smoltz** (30) | 30,634 | 52–30 |
| 83 | July 3 | Expos | 4–5 | Vargas (6–3) | **Reynolds** (5–4) | Manon (1) | 31,607 | 52–31 |
| 84 | July 4 | Expos | 8–6 | **Ortiz** (11–4) | Ohka (7–8) | **Smoltz** (31) | 48,923 | 53–31 |
| 85 | July 5 | Expos | 3–2 | **Bong** (6–1) | Biddle (3–3) | — | 34,454 | 54–31 |
| 86 | July 6 | Expos | 7–5 | **Hampton** (4–5) | Drew (0–1) | **Smoltz** (32) | 27,724 | 55–31 |
| 87 | July 7 | @ Mets | 7–3 | **Ramirez** (8–2) | Seo (5–5) | — | 32,399 | 56–31 |
| 88 | July 8 | @ Mets | 5–3 | **Reynolds** (6–4) | Roach (0–2) | **Smoltz** (33) | 29,096 | 57–31 |
| 89 | July 9 | @ Mets | 6–3 | **Ortiz** (12–4) | Glavine (6–9) | **Smoltz** (34) | 30,308 | 58–31 |
| 90 | July 10 | @ Cubs | 13–3 | **Maddux** (7–8) | Estes (6–8) | — | 38,756 | 59–31 |
| 91 | July 11 | @ Cubs | 9–5 | **Hampton** (5–5) | Prior (8–5) | — | 39,334 | 60–31 |
| 92 | July 12 | @ Cubs | 3–7 | Clement (7–7) | **Ramirez** (8–3) | — | 39,980 | 60–32 |
| 93 | July 13 | @ Cubs | 7–2 | **Reynolds** (7–4) | Zambrano (6–8) | — | 39,832 | 61–32 |
**74th All-Star Game in Chicago, Illinois**
| 94 | July 17 | Mets | 3–2 | **Maddux** (8–8) | Franco (0–2) | — | 36,688 | 62–32 |
| 95 | July 18 | Mets | 11–4 | **Hampton** (6–5) | Seo (5–6) | — | 44,815 | 63–32 |
| 96 | July 19 | Mets | 7–4 | **Ortiz** (13–4) | Glavine (6–10) | **Smoltz** (35) | 45,759 | 64–32 |
| 97 | July 20 | Mets | 11–8 | **King** (3–0) | Stanton (2–4) | **Smoltz** (36) | 36,029 | 65–32 |
| 98 | July 21 | Cubs | 6–15 | Veres (1–1) | **Reynolds** (7–5) | — | 39,950 | 65–33 |
| 99 | July 22 | Cubs | 8–4 | **Maddux** (9–8) | Mitre (0–1) | — | 39,226 | 66–33 |
| 100 | July 23 | Marlins | 4–5 (12) | Bump (3–0) | **Hodges** (3–1) | — | 27,137 | 66–34 |
| 101 | July 24 | Marlins | 5–2 | **Ortiz** (14–4) | Penny (8–8) | **Smoltz** (37) | 33,711 | 67–34 |
| 102 | July 25 | @ Expos | 8–9 (11) | Ayala (7–2) | **Bong** (6–2) | — | 10,069 | 67–35 |
| 103 | July 26 | @ Expos | 15–4 | **Reynolds** (8–5) | Day (4–4) | — | 14,132 | 68–35 |
| 104 | July 27 | @ Expos | 10–13 | Manon (1–2) | **King** (3–1) | Biddle (25) | 16,074 | 68–36 |
| 105 | July 28 | @ Expos | 10–8 | **Hampton** (7–5) | Vazquez (8–7) | **Smoltz** (38) | 9,750 | 69–36 |
| 106 | July 29 | Astros | 6–3 | **Ortiz** (15–4) | Stone (5–4) | **Smoltz** (39) | 30,415 | 70–36 |
| 107 | July 30 | Astros | 3–7 | Villone (3–1) | **Ramirez** (8–4) | — | 27,960 | 70–37 |
| 108 | July 31 | Astros | 7–4 | **Reynolds** (9–5) | Miller (7–10) | **Smoltz** (40) | 30,047 | 71–37 |

August: 16–12 (Home: 8–5; Away: 8–7)

| # | Date | Opponent | Score | Win | Loss | Save | Attendance | Record |
|---|---|---|---|---|---|---|---|---|
| 109 | August 1 | Dodgers | 2–0 | **Maddux** (10–8) | Nomo (12–9) | **Smoltz** (41) | 37,951 | 72–37 |
| 110 | August 2 | Dodgers | 6–4 | **Hampton** (8–5) | Ashby (2–9) | **Smoltz** (42) | 47,506 | 73–37 |
| 111 | August 3 | Dodgers | 4–8 | Mota (3–2) | **Ortiz** (15–5) | — | 34,930 | 73–38 |
| 112 | August 5 | @ Brewers | 3–4 | DeJean (3–7) | **Holmes** (1–2) | Kolb (5) | 20,986 | 73–39 |
| 113 | August 6 | @ Brewers | 10–2 | **Maddux** (11–8) | Franklin (7–9) | — | 30,010 | 74–39 |
| 114 | August 7 | @ Brewers | 7–1 | **Hampton** (9–5) | Obermueller (0–3) | — | 31,097 | 75–39 |
| 115 | August 8 | @ Cardinals | 7–2 | **Ortiz** (16–5) | Fassero (1–6) | — | 45,796 | 76–39 |
| 116 | August 9 | @ Cardinals | 1–3 | Stephenson (6–11) | **Reynolds** (9–6) | Isringhausen (10) | 47,692 | 76–40 |
| 117 | August 10 | @ Cardinals | 2–3 | Eldred (5–4) | **Smoltz** (0–2) | Isringhausen (11) | 39,320 | 76–41 |
| 118 | August 12 | Padres | 4–14 | Eaton (7–8) | **Maddux** (11–9) | — | 25,422 | 76–42 |
| 119 | August 13 | Padres | 7–1 | **Hampton** (10–5) | Jarvis (4–5) | — | 20,862 | 77–42 |
| 120 | August 14 | Padres | 7–4 | **Ortiz** (17–5) | Peavy (9–9) | **Smoltz** (43) | 23,923 | 78–42 |
| 121 | August 15 | Diamondbacks | 10–4 | **Reynolds** (10–6) | Johnson (3–5) | — | 34,544 | 79–42 |
| 122 | August 16 | Diamondbacks | 10–6 | **Gryboski** (6–3) | Oropesa (3–3) | — | 49,127 | 80–42 |
| 123 | August 17 | Diamondbacks | 0–2 | Schilling (7–6) | **Maddux** (11–10) | Mantei (18) | 37,606 | 80–43 |
| 124 | August 18 | Diamondbacks | 6–1 | **Hampton** (11–5) | Batista (7–7) | — | 23,986 | 81–43 |
| 125 | August 19 | @ Giants | 4–5 (10) | Worrell (4–3) | **King** (3–2) | — | 42,307 | 81–44 |
| 126 | August 20 | @ Giants | 1–2 | Nathan (8–3) | **Gryboski** (6–4) | — | 41,974 | 81–45 |
| 127 | August 21 | @ Giants | 3–4 (10) | Rodriguez (7–2) | **Hodges** (3–2) | — | 41,745 | 81–46 |
| 128 | August 22 | @ Rockies | 9–3 | **Maddux** (12–10) | Jennings (10–12) | — | 35,578 | 82–46 |
| 129 | August 23 | @ Rockies | 5–4 | **Hampton** (12–5) | Tsao (2–2) | **Smoltz** (44) | 42,303 | 83–46 |
| 130 | August 24 | @ Rockies | 12–6 | **Ortiz** (18–5) | Stark (2–2) | — | 31,227 | 84–46 |
| 131 | August 26 | Mets | 5–6 | Seo (8–8) | **Reynolds** (10–7) | Stanton (4) | 24,694 | 84–47 |
| 132 | August 27 | Mets | 4–1 | **Maddux** (13–10) | Heilman (2–6) | **Mercker** (1) | 23,755 | 85–47 |
| 133 | August 28 | Mets | 1–3 | Leiter (13–7) | **Hampton** (12–6) | Weathers (5) | 27,856 | 85–48 |
| 134 | August 29 | @ Pirates | 5–6 | Tavárez (3–3) | **Cunnane** (0–1) | — | 27,415 | 85–49 |
| 135 | August 30 | @ Pirates | 13–6 | **Ramirez** (9–4) | Perez (4–8) | — | 21,323 | 86–49 |
| 136 | August 31 | @ Pirates | 10–4 | **Reynolds** (11–7) | D'Amico (8–13) | — | 23,822 | 87–49 |

September: 14–12 (Home: 9–5; Away: 5–7)

| # | Date | Opponent | Score | Win | Loss | Save | Attendance | Record |
|---|---|---|---|---|---|---|---|---|
| 137 | September 1 | @ Mets | 2–3 | Wheeler (1–2) | **Hodges** (3–3) | Weathers (6) | 23,877 | 87–50 |
| 138 | September 2 | @ Mets | 1–3 | Leiter (14–7) | **Hampton** (12–7) | Weathers (7) | 24,390 | 87–51 |
| 139 | September 3 | @ Mets | 3–9 | Trachsel (14–8) | **Ortiz** (18–6) | — | 16,439 | 87–52 |
| 140 | September 5 (1) | Pirates | 3–2 (10) | **Cunnane** (1–1) | Corey (0–2) | — | N/A | 88–52 |
| 141 | September 5 (2) | Pirates | 3–5 | Corey (1–2) | **Reynolds** (11–8) | Tavárez (5) | 31,849 | 88–53 |
| 142 | September 6 | Pirates | 9–2 | **Maddux** (14–10) | D'Amico (8–14) | — | 36,932 | 89–53 |
| 143 | September 7 | Pirates | 2–1 | **Hampton** (13–7) | Wells (7–8) | **Cunnane** (1) | 27,703 | 90–53 |
| 144 | September 8 | Phillies | 6–4 | **Ortiz** (19–6) | Millwood (14–10) | **Cunnane** (2) | 17,543 | 91–53 |
| 145 | September 9 | Phillies | 5–18 | Wolf (14–9) | **Reynolds** (11–9) | — | 21,257 | 91–54 |
| 146 | September 10 | Phillies | 4–2 | **Ramirez** (10–4) | Padilla (13–10) | **Cunnane** (3) | 21,321 | 92–54 |
| 147 | September 11 | Phillies | 3–8 | Myers (14–7) | **Maddux** (14–11) | — | 23,811 | 92–55 |
| 148 | September 12 | @ Marlins | 4–5 | Looper (6–3) | **King** (3–3) | — | 25,622 | 92–56 |
| 149 | September 13 | @ Marlins | 3–8 | Willis (13–6) | **Ortiz** (19–7) | — | 40,414 | 92–57 |
| 150 | September 14 | @ Marlins | 8–4 | **Cunnane** (2–1) | Looper (6–4) | — | 18,725 | 93–57 |
| 151 | September 15 | @ Expos | 10–6 | **Ramirez** (11–4) | L. Hernandez (15–9) | — | 9,696 | 94–57 |
| 152 | September 16 | @ Expos | 4–5 (10) | Biddle (5–8) | **R. Hernandez** (5–3) | — | 9,843 | 94–58 |
| 153 | September 17 | @ Expos | 14–4 | **Hampton** (14–7) | Tucker (1–3) | — | 17,526 | 95–58 |
| 154 | September 19 | Marlins | 1–0 | **Ortiz** (20–7) | Beckett (8–8) | — | 35,942 | 96–58 |
| 155 | September 20 | Marlins | 5–6 (11) | Helling (8–8) | **Cunnane** (2–2) | — | 42,496 | 96–59 |
| 156 | September 21 | Marlins | 8–0 | **Maddux** (15–11) | Pavano (11–13) | — | 33,827 | 97–59 |
| 157 | September 22 | Marlins | 3–6 | Redman (14–9) | **Hampton** (14–8) | Urbina (29) | 17,345 | 97–60 |
| 158 | September 23 | Expos | 2–0 | **Wright** (2–5) | Vazquez (13–12) | **Smoltz** (45) | 22,539 | 98–60 |
| 159 | September 24 | Expos | 9–1 | **Ortiz** (21–7) | Day (9–8) | — | 23,594 | 99–60 |
| 160 | September 26 | @ Phillies | 6–0 | **Ramirez** (12–4) | Padilla (14–12) | — | 58,096 | 100–60 |
| 161 | September 27 | @ Phillies | 6–7 (10) | Cormier (8–0) | **King** (3–4) | — | 58,303 | 100–61 |
| 162 | September 28 | @ Phillies | 5–2 | **Maddux** (16–11) | Millwood (14–12) | **Marquis** (1) | 58,554 | 101–61 |

Legend: = Win = Loss
Bold = Braves team member

== Player stats ==
=== Batting ===
Note: Pos = Position; G = Games played; AB = At bats; H = Hits; Avg. = Batting average; HR = Home runs; RBI = Runs batted in

| Pos | Player | G | AB | H | Avg. | HR | RBI |
|---|---|---|---|---|---|---|---|
| C | Javy López | 129 | 457 | 150 | .328 | 43 | 109 |
| 1B | Robert Fick | 126 | 409 | 110 | .269 | 11 | 80 |
| 2B | Marcus Giles | 145 | 551 | 174 | .316 | 21 | 69 |
| SS | Rafael Furcal | 156 | 664 | 194 | .292 | 15 | 61 |
| 3B | Vinny Castilla | 147 | 542 | 150 | .277 | 22 | 76 |
| LF | Chipper Jones | 153 | 555 | 169 | .305 | 27 | 106 |
| CF | Andruw Jones | 156 | 595 | 165 | .277 | 36 | 116 |
| RF | Gary Sheffield | 155 | 576 | 190 | .330 | 39 | 132 |

==== Other batters ====
Note: G = Games played; AB = At bats; H = Hits; Avg. = Batting average; HR = Home runs; RBI = Runs batted in

| Player | G | AB | H | Avg. | HR | RBI |
|---|---|---|---|---|---|---|
| Mark DeRosa | 103 | 266 | 70 | .263 | 6 | 22 |
| Julio Franco | 103 | 197 | 58 | .294 | 5 | 31 |
| Darren Bragg | 104 | 162 | 39 | .241 | 0 | 9 |
| Henry Blanco | 55 | 151 | 30 | .199 | 1 | 13 |
| Matt Franco | 112 | 134 | 33 | .246 | 3 | 15 |
| Johnny Estrada | 16 | 36 | 11 | .306 | 0 | 2 |
| Mike Hessman | 19 | 21 | 6 | .286 | 2 | 3 |
| Ryan Langerhans | 16 | 15 | 4 | .267 | 0 | 0 |
| Jesse Garcia | 13 | 10 | 4 | .400 | 0 | 2 |

=== Pitching ===
==== Starting pitchers ====
Note: G = Games pitched; IP = Innings pitched; W = Wins; L = Losses; ERA = Earned run average; SO = Strikeouts

| Player | G | IP | W | L | ERA | SO |
|---|---|---|---|---|---|---|
| Greg Maddux | 36 | 218.1 | 16 | 11 | 3.96 | 124 |
| Russ Ortiz | 34 | 212.1 | 21 | 7 | 3.81 | 149 |
| Mike Hampton | 31 | 190.0 | 14 | 8 | 3.84 | 110 |
| Horacio Ramírez | 29 | 182.1 | 12 | 4 | 4.00 | 100 |
| Shane Reynolds | 30 | 167.1 | 11 | 9 | 5.43 | 94 |

===== Relief pitchers =====
Note: G = Games pitched; W = Wins; L = Losses; SV = Saves; ERA = Earned run average; SO = Strikeouts

| Player | G | W | L | SV | ERA | SO |
|---|---|---|---|---|---|---|
| John Smoltz | 62 | 0 | 2 | 45 | 1.12 | 73 |
| Ray King | 80 | 3 | 4 | 0 | 3.51 | 43 |
| Roberto Hernandez | 66 | 5 | 3 | 0 | 4.35 | 45 |
| Kevin Gryboski | 64 | 6 | 4 | 0 | 3.86 | 32 |
| Trey Hodges | 52 | 3 | 3 | 0 | 4.66 | 66 |
| Darren Holmes | 48 | 1 | 2 | 0 | 4.29 | 46 |
| Jung Bong | 44 | 6 | 2 | 1 | 5.05 | 47 |
| Jason Marquis | 21 | 0 | 0 | 1 | 5.53 | 19 |
| Will Cunnane | 20 | 2 | 2 | 3 | 2.70 | 20 |
| Kent Mercker | 18 | 0 | 0 | 1 | 1.06 | 7 |
| Jaret Wright | 11 | 1 | 0 | 0 | 2.00 | 9 |
| Joey Dawley | 5 | 0 | 0 | 0 | 18.00 | 8 |

== Postseason ==
=== Game log ===
2003 Postseason Game Log
National League Division Series: 2–3

| # | Date | Opponent | Score | Win | Loss | Save | Attendance | Record |
|---|---|---|---|---|---|---|---|---|
| 1 | September 30 | Cubs | 2–4 | Wood (1–0) | Ortiz (0–1) | Borowski (1) | 52,043 | 0–1 |
| 2 | October 1 | Cubs | 5–3 | Smoltz (1–0) | Veres (0–1) | — | 52,743 | 1–1 |
| 3 | October 3 | @ Cubs | 1–3 | Prior (1–0) | Maddux (0–1) | — | 39,982 | 1–2 |
| 4 | October 4 | @ Cubs | 6–4 | Ortiz (1–1) | Clement (0–1) | Smoltz (1) | 39,983 | 2–2 |
| 5 | October 5 | Cubs | 1–5 | Wood (2–0) | Hampton (0–1) | — | 54,357 | 2–3 |

== Award winners ==
2003 Major League Baseball All-Star Game

== Farm system ==
| Level | Team | League | Manager |
|---|---|---|---|
| AAA | Richmond Braves | International League | Pat Kelly |
| AA | Greenville Braves | Southern League | Brian Snitker |
| A | Myrtle Beach Pelicans | Carolina League | Randy Ingle |
| A | Rome Braves | South Atlantic League | Rocket Wheeler |
| Rookie | Danville Braves | Appalachian League | Kevin McMullan |
| Rookie | GCL Braves | Gulf Coast League | Ralph Henriquez |

LEAGUE CHAMPIONS: Rome, GCL Braves
