= Félix Sánchez =

Félix Sánchez may refer to:

- Félix Sánchez (football manager) (born 1975), Spanish football manager
- Félix Sánchez (hurdler) (born 1977), Dominican track and field athlete
  - Félix Sánchez Olympic Stadium, stadium in the Dominican Republic named after the athlete
- Félix Sánchez (baseball) (born 1981), Dominican baseball pitcher
