= Scott Randall =

American baseball player (born 1975)

- Pitcher
- Born: October 29, 1975 (age 49); Fullerton, California, U.S.
- Batted: Right Threw: Right

MLB debut
- August 26, 2003, for the Cincinnati Reds

Last MLB appearance
- September 28, 2003, for the Cincinnati Reds

MLB statistics
- Win–loss record: 2–5
- Earned run average: 6.51
- Strikeouts: 25
- Stats at Baseball Reference

Teams
- Cincinnati Reds (2003)

Scott Phillip Randall (born October 29, 1975) is an American former professional baseball pitcher. Randall's Major League Baseball (MLB) career began in June 1995 when he was drafted by the Colorado Rockies in the 11th round of the Major League Baseball draft. He was later traded to the Minnesota Twins for outfielder and switch hitter Chris Latham. Randall went on to play for the Texas Rangers and both the Rockies and Twins for a second time before his MLB debut with the Cincinnati Reds. He appeared in 15 games for the Cincinnati Reds (2003). Randall's final Major League game took place on September 28, 2003, with the Cincinnati Reds.

Before joining the major leagues, Randall played for Santa Barbara City College's baseball team, The Vaqueros, in 1995.
