= Cory Vance =

American baseball player (born 1979)

- Pitcher
- Born: June 20, 1979 (age 46); Dayton, Ohio, U.S.
- Batted: Left Threw: Left

MLB debut
- September 21, 2002, for the Colorado Rockies

Last MLB appearance
- September 26, 2003, for the Colorado Rockies

MLB statistics
- Win–loss record: 1–3
- Earned run average: 5.74
- Strikeouts: 13
- Stats at Baseball Reference

Teams
- Colorado Rockies (2002–2003)

Cory Wade Vance (born June 20, 1979) is a former Major League Baseball pitcher who played for the Colorado Rockies from 2002 to 2003.

== Amateur career ==
Vance attended Georgia Tech and in 1998 and 1999, he played collegiate summer baseball with the Falmouth Commodores of the Cape Cod Baseball League. He went 13-3 with a 3.40 ERA and 123 strikeouts in 2000. This performance earned him an Atlantic Coast Conference All-Star selection, and he was also named a 3rd team College All-American.

== Professional career ==
He was drafted by the Colorado Rockies in the 4th round of the 2000 Major League Baseball draft. He had a 1.12 ERA in 24 innings with Low-A Portland to finish the 2000 season. In 2001, he went 10-8 with a 3.10 ERA for High-A Salem and 10-8 with a 3.78 ERA for Double-A Carolina in 2002. Vance also appeared in 2 games for the major league team after a September call up. After posting his first losing record (9-11) with the Triple-A Colorado Springs Sky Sox in 2003, though he did play 9 games in the majors, he was claimed off waivers by the Texas Rangers on April 8, 2004. He has the distinction of being in the mound when Rickey Henderson stole his 1406th base of his career on Vance's a pick up throw to first base. Henderson, then with the Los Angeles Dodgers, beat first baseman Todd Helton's throw to second base for the final stolen base of his career in a 2003 game between the Rockies and Dodgers. Vance played 8 games with the Rangers' Triple-A team in Oklahoma in 2004 before his career ended.

== Personal life ==
Today Cory serves the City of Casa Grande (AZ) Fire Department and holds the rank of Engineer. He has been a firefighter with the City of Casa Grande Fire Department since March 2008. He lives with his wife and two daughters in the Phoenix Metro area.
