= Jason Young (baseball) =

American baseball player (born 1979)

- Pitcher
- Born: September 28, 1979 (age 46); Oakland, California, U.S.
- Batted: Right Threw: Right

MLB debut
- May 12, 2003, for the Colorado Rockies

Last MLB appearance
- May 21, 2004, for the Colorado Rockies

MLB statistics
- Win–loss record: 0-3
- Earned run average: 9.71
- Strikeouts: 25
- Stats at Baseball Reference

Teams
- Colorado Rockies (2003–2004)

Jason Kariya Young (born September 28, 1979) is an American former professional baseball player. A right-handed pitcher, he played two seasons in Major League Baseball for the Colorado Rockies.

Young attended Stanford University. In 1998, he played collegiate summer baseball in the Cape Cod Baseball League for the Yarmouth-Dennis Red Sox.

Drafted by the Colorado Rockies in the 2nd round of the 2000 MLB amateur draft, Young made his Major League Baseball debut with the Rockies on May 12, 2003.

He retired in summer 2011 at the age of 31,, although he had not played professionally since 2005.
