= Brandon Villafuerte =

American baseball player (born 1975)

- Pitcher
- Born: December 17, 1975 (age 50); Hilo, Hawaii, U.S.
- Batted: Right Threw: Right

MLB debut
- May 23, 2000, for the Detroit Tigers

Last MLB appearance
- July 21, 2004, for the Arizona Diamondbacks

MLB statistics
- Win–loss record: 1–7
- Earned run average: 4.12
- Strikeouts: 77
- Stats at Baseball Reference

Teams
- Detroit Tigers (2000); Texas Rangers (2001); San Diego Padres (2002–2003); Arizona Diamondbacks (2004)

Brandon Paul Villafuerte (born December 17, 1975) is an American former professional baseball pitcher. He played in Major League Baseball (MLB) for the Detroit Tigers, Texas Rangers, San Diego Padres and Arizona Diamondbacks.

In 2008, he played in the Florida Marlins organization for the Triple-A Albuquerque Isotopes. In 62 games, he went 7–3 with a 3.50 ERA and 57 strikeouts.

Villafuerte pitched two seasons for the Bravos de Margarita club of the Venezuelan Winter League.

He lives in the Tucson, Arizona area and works as a computer technician.
