= René Reyes =

Venezuelan baseball player (born 1978)

- Outfielder / Coach
- Born: February 21, 1978 (age 48); Isla Margarita, Venezuela
- Batted: Switch Threw: Right

MLB debut
- July 22, 2003, for the Colorado Rockies

Last MLB appearance
- June 2, 2004, for the Colorado Rockies

MLB statistics
- Batting average: .220
- Home runs: 2
- Runs batted in: 8
- Stats at Baseball Reference

Teams
- Colorado Rockies (2003–2004)
Medals
Men's baseball
Representing Venezuela
Central American and Caribbean Games
Bronze medal – third place	2006 Cartagena	Team

René José Reyes Velásquez (born February 21, 1978) is a Venezuelan former professional baseball outfielder and switch-hitter. He played in Major League Baseball (MLB) for the Colorado Rockies in the 2003 and 2004 seasons.

== Playing career ==
=== Colorado Rockies ===
Reyes' only MLB experience came as a member of the Colorado Rockies in part of two seasons spanning 2003–2004. In a two-season career, Reyes batted .220 with two home runs and eight RBI in 81 games.

=== Rojos del Aguila de Veracruz ===
Reyes would go on to spend 2006 with the Rojos del Aguila de Veracruz of the Mexican League. He played in four games for the team, going 2-for-15 (.133) with one RBI and two walks.

=== Petroleros de Minatitlan ===
Reyes spent the 2007 campaign with the Petroleros de Minatitlan of the Mexican League. Reyes played in 12 games for Minatitlan, hitting .326/.444/.512 with one home run, seven RBI, and one stolen base.

=== Pericos de Puebla ===
Reyes signed with the Pericos de Puebla of the Mexican League prior to the 2008 season. He played in 75 games for the team, hitting .337/.387/.540 with 12 home runs, 46 RBI, and 13 stolen bases.

In 2009, Reyes made 105 appearances for the Pericos, batting .355/.431/.551 with 12 home runs, 87 RBI, and 12 stolen bases. He played in 105 contests for Puebla during the 2010 season, slashing .336/.401/.535 with 16 home runs, 84 RBI, and seven stolen bases.

=== Rieleros de Aguascalientes ===
Reyes signed with the Rieleros de Aguascalientes on March 16, 2012. In 105 appearances for Aguascalientes, he batted .306/.411/.510 with 16 home runs, 86 RBI, and 25 stolen bases.

Reyes made 80 appearances for the Rieleros in 2013, slashing .332/.429/.503 with 11 home runs, 60 RBI, and seven stolen bases.

=== Diablos Rojos del México ===
On June 29, 2013, Reyes was traded to the Diablos Rojos del México of the Mexican League. He played in 30 games for the Diablos, batting .297/.356/.483 with five home runs and 20 RBI.

=== Leones de Yucatán ===
On March 31, 2014, Reyes was assigned to the Leones de Yucatán of the Mexican League. He made 109 appearances for Yucatán, batting .316/.418/.513 with 14 home runs, 71 RBI, and 11 stolen bases.

=== Rieleros de Aguascalientes (second stint) ===
On February 6, 2015, Reyes signed with the Rieleros de Aguascalientes of the Mexican League. In 23 games for the team, he batted .341/.452/.482 with two home runs, 18 RBI, and one stolen bases. On May 8, Reyes was released by the Rieleros.

=== Toros de Tijuana ===
On May 21, 2015, Reyes was assigned to the Toros de Tijuana of the Mexican League. In 33 appearances for the Toros, he slashed .320/.380/.541 with seven home runs, 20 RBI, and two stolen bases. Reyes was released by Tijuana on July 6.

=== Vaqueros Unión Laguna ===
On May 10, 2016, Reyes signed with the Vaqueros Unión Laguna. In 16 appearances for the Vaqueros, he batted .325/.422/.541 with 10 home runs, 48 RBI, and four stolen bases. Reyes was released by Unión Laguna on September 21.

=== Tigres de Quintana Roo ===
On May 16, 2017, Reyes signed with the Tigres de Quintana Roo of the Mexican League. In 33 games for Quintana Roo, he batted .275/.378/.459 with six home runs and 24 RBI.

=== Olmecas de Tabasco ===
On July 5, 2017, Reyes was traded to the Olmecas de Tabasco of the Mexican League. He played in 10 games for the Olmecas, going 5-for-35 (.143) with one RBI and two walks. On July 18, Reyes was released by Tabasco.

== Coaching career ==
Reyes spent the 2025 season as a coach for the Toros de Tijuana of the Mexican League. On October 15, 2025, Reyes and the Toros parted ways.

== See also ==
- List of Major League Baseball players from Venezuela
