= Jung Bong =

South Korean baseball player (born 1980)

Bong Jung-keun
- Pitcher
- Born: July 15, 1980 (age 45); Seoul, South Korea
- Batted: Left Threw: Left

Professional debut
- MLB: April 23, 2002, for the Atlanta Braves
- KBO: April 11, 2007, for the LG Twins

Last appearance
- MLB: June 20, 2004, for the Cincinnati Reds
- KBO: October 4, 2016, for the LG Twins

MLB statistics
- Win–loss record: 7–4
- Earned run average: 5.17
- Strikeouts: 62

KBO statistics
- Win–loss record: 55–46
- Earned run average: 3.41
- Strikeouts: 654
- Saves: 109
- Stats at Baseball Reference

Teams
- Atlanta Braves (2002–2003); Cincinnati Reds (2004); LG Twins (2007–2016)

Career highlights and awards
- All-World Baseball Classic Team (2009)
Medals
Men's baseball
Representing South Korea
Olympic Games
Gold medal – first place	2008 Beijing	Team
World Baseball Classic
Silver medal – second place	2009 Los Angeles	Team
Bronze medal – third place	2006 San Diego	Team

- Jung Bong
- Hangul: 봉중근
- Hanja: 奉重根
- RR: Bong Junggeun
- MR: Pong Chunggŭn

Bong Jung-keun (Korean: 봉중근; Hanja: 奉重根; Korean pronunciation: [poŋdʑuŋɡɯ̽n] or [poŋ] [t͡ɕuŋɡɯ̽n]; born July 15, 1980) is a South Korean former professional baseball player. He played in Major League Baseball with the Atlanta Braves and Cincinnati Reds, and in the KBO League with the LG Twins. He batted and threw left-handed.

== Career ==
=== Amateur ===
Bong is often considered one of the greatest hitting pitchers in Korean high school baseball history. While attending Shinil High School in Seoul, he was a highly regarded five-tool player and control pitcher in the Korean High School baseball league, playing as the team's 3rd batter and No.1 starter.

In September 1996, as a freshman at Shinil High School, Bong was named the Best Pitcher in the 50th Golden Lion Flag National High School Baseball Championship, taking 4 of the team's 5 wins. As the team's leadoff hitter, he batted .353 with 6 hits in 17 at-bats.

In May 1997, Bong led his team to its national title at the 52nd Blue Dragon Flag National High School Baseball Championship, going 11-for-16 with 9 RBIs as a batter and racking up 3 wins as a starting pitcher. He won batting (.688), RBI and wins titles, and was unanimously named the tournament MVP.

In September 1997, Bong helped his team to capture another national title at the 51st Golden Lion Flag National High School Baseball Championship. He was named Best Pitcher, earning 4 out of the team's 5 wins as a utility pitcher. As a batter, Bong finished runner-up in batting (.571, 8-for-14) and won the stolen bases title.

=== International ===
In August 1997, Bong competed for the South Korea national junior baseball team in the World Junior Baseball Championship held in Moncton, Canada. In the round robin phase, he went 15-for-25 with 11 RBIs and 13 runs, and hit home runs in 4 consecutive games, playing in 5 preliminary games as a center fielder and relief pitcher. South Korea was eliminated by USA 7–0 in the quarterfinals, but Bong additionally accumulated 3 hits and 3 RBIs in the 5th–8th classification games. He finished the tournament with a .500 batting average (18-for-36), 14 RBIs and 4 home runs, and was named the tournament MVP. He also won the home run title and was selected to the All-Star team as an outfielder as well.

Bong also helped Korea to the gold medal at the 2008 Olympics in Beijing.

Bong also appeared in the 2009 World Baseball Classic against Japan as a starter, allowing 3 hits and scoring 2 strikeouts in 5 1/3 innings for a 1–0 victory.

=== Notable international careers ===
Year	Venue	Competition	Team	Individual note
1997	Canada	World Junior Baseball Championship	5th	.500 BA (18-for-36), 4 HR, 14 RBI; MVP, All-Star (OF), HR title
2006	United States	World Baseball Classic	Silver medal	0–0, 0.00 ERA (3 G, 2.2 IP, 0 ER, 1 K)
2008	China	Olympic Games	Gold medal	0–0, 8.31 ERA (2 G, 8.2 IP, 8 ER, 6 K)
2009	United States	World Baseball Classic	Silver medal	2–0, 0.51 ERA (4 G, 17.2 IP, 1 ER, 4 K); All-Star (P)
2010	China	Asian Games	Gold medal	0–0, 0.00 ERA (1 G, 1.1 IP, 0 ER, 1 K)

=== Major League Baseball career ===
Bong began his career with the Braves, signing with the team in 1998 while still in High school for a bonus of $1.7 million. Bong made his major league debut in 2002 pitching 6 innings in one game. The next year, he was moved to the bullpen and pitched in 44 games, winning six and losing two, and recorded his first save. With the Reds in 2004, he pitched 15 1/3 innings, winning one game and losing one. He missed the whole 2005 season due to shoulder surgery, and the Reds outrighted him to Triple-A Louisville after the season.

=== KBO League career ===
The Reds released him on May 12, 2006; he returned to Korea to continue his career.

In 2008, with the LG Twins, Bong had a 2.66 ERA and 140 strikeouts.

Bong retired from professional baseball on September 19, 2018, after 12 years playing for the LG Twins.

=== Personal records ===
Year	Team	G	GS	W	L	SV	H	CG	ShO	IP	H	HR	BB	K	R	ER	ERA
2002	ATL	1	1	0	1	0	0	0	0	6.0	8	0	2	4	5	5	7.50
2003	ATL	44	0	6	2	1	2	0	0	57.0	56	8	31	47	32	32	5.05
2004	CIN	3	3	1	1	0	0	0	0	15.1	17	3	10	11	13	8	4.70
2007	LG	24	22	6	7	0	0	0	0	111.2	121	6	60	56	71	66	5.32
2008	LG	28	28	11	8	0	0	0	0	186.1	153	13	80	140	66	55	2.66
2009	LG	26	26	11	12	0	0	0	0	172.1	160	13	71	127	70	63	3.29
2010	LG	28	28	10	9	0	0	0	0	178.1	166	13	83	130	74	71	3.58
2011	LG	4	4	1	2	0	0	0	0	16.1	13	1	14	7	9	9	4.96
2012	LG	40	0	0	1	26	0	0	0	38.0	26	1	14	36	5	5	1.18
2013	LG	55	0	8	1	38	0	0	0	61.0	44	2	17	54	10	9	1.33
2014	LG	50	0	2	4	30	0	0	0	49.2	51	2	17	45	16	16	2.90
2015	LG	47	2	5	1	15	0	0	0	49.1	60	10	23	39	28	27	4.93
2016	LG	19	5	1	0	0	2	0	0	36.1	41	4	22	20	23	20	4.95
TOTAL		276	119	62	49	110	4	0	0	976.2	916	76	444	716	422	386	3.95

== Filmography ==
=== Television shows ===
Year	Title	Role	Ref.
2022	Back to the Ground	Contestant	
