= John Riedling =

American baseball player (born 1975)

- Pitcher
- Born: August 29, 1975 (age 50); Fort Lauderdale, Florida, U.S.
- Batted: Right Threw: Right

MLB debut
- August 30, 2000, for the Cincinnati Reds

Last MLB appearance
- August 28, 2005, for the Florida Marlins

MLB statistics
- Win–loss record: 17–13
- Earned run average: 4.41
- Strikeouts: 198
- Stats at Baseball Reference

Teams
- Cincinnati Reds (2000–2004); Florida Marlins (2005)

John Richard Riedling (born August 29, 1975) is a former Major League Baseball pitcher.

Riedling was drafted by the Cincinnati Reds in the 22nd round of the 1994 Major League Baseball draft. His major league debut occurred on August 30, 2000. Riedling played for the Long Island Ducks of the independent Atlantic League in 2007. Riedling is currently a baseball instructor and has also worked with Expert Village.
