= Denny Stark =

American baseball player (born 1974)

- Pitcher
- Born: October 27, 1974 (age 51); Edgerton, Ohio, U.S.
- Batted: Right Threw: Right

MLB debut
- September 15, 1999, for the Seattle Mariners

Last MLB appearance
- June 2, 2009, for the Seattle Mariners

MLB statistics
- Win–loss record: 15–14
- Earned run average: 5.81
- Strikeouts: 127
- Stats at Baseball Reference

Former teams
- Seattle Mariners (1999, 2001); Colorado Rockies (2002–2004); Seattle Mariners (2009)

Dennis James Stark (born October 27, 1974) is an American former Major League Baseball (MLB) right-handed pitcher who played with the Seattle Mariners across two separate stints, as well as for the Colorado Rockies, from 1999 to 2009.

== Amateur career ==
A native of Edgerton, Ohio, Stark attended Edgerton High School and the University of Toledo. In 1995 he played collegiate summer baseball with the Wareham Gatemen of the Cape Cod Baseball League.

== Professional career ==
=== Seattle Mariners ===
Drafted by the Seattle Mariners in the fourth round of the 1996 Major League Baseball draft, Stark would make his major league debut with the Mariners on September 15, 1999.

=== Colorado Rockies ===
On December 16, 2001, the Mariners traded Stark with Brian Fuentes and José Paniagua to the Colorado Rockies for Jeff Cirillo. In 2002, Stark saw his best year statistically to date. Playing for the Colorado Rockies he went 11–4 with a 4.00 ERA in 32 games, 20 of those were starts. Stark's career started to decline from here, in 2003 he appeared in 17 games, 13 started, and had a record of 3–3 with a 5.83 ERA. Stark's worst year statistically was in 2004, when he went 0–5 in six games, all starts, with an 11.42 ERA.

=== Cleveland Indians ===
After his tumultuous season in 2004, Stark signed a minor league deal with the Cleveland Indians. Stark pitched in spring training but never made the team and was shut down for the season due to an elbow injury.

Stark missed the entire 2006 and 2007 seasons after undergoing two Tommy John surgeries.

=== Seattle Mariners (second stint) ===
On March 8, 2008, Stark signed a minor league contract with the Seattle Mariners. He spent the season working his way back into pitching shape pitching for the Double-A West Tenn Diamond Jaxx and Triple-A Tacoma Rainiers. He was re-signed by the Mariners at the end of the season. He made his first major league appearance since 2004 on May 3, 2009 when he pitched 2/3 of an inning against the Oakland Athletics. He was designated for assignment by the Mariners on June 7. He was granted free agency on October 15, 2009.

=== Bridgeport Bluefish ===
Stark played for the Bridgeport Bluefish of the Atlantic League of Professional Baseball in 2010. In 37 games (17 starts) 134 2/3 innings he went 8–4 with a 4.68 ERA with 86 strikeouts and 1 save.
