= Jesse Foppert =

American baseball player (born 1980)

- Pitcher
- Born: July 10, 1980 (age 46); Reading, Pennsylvania, U.S.
- Batted: Right Threw: Right

MLB debut
- April 14, 2003, for the San Francisco Giants

Last MLB appearance
- June 24, 2005, for the San Francisco Giants

MLB statistics
- Win–loss record: 8–9
- Earned run average: 5.00
- Strikeouts: 109
- Stats at Baseball Reference

Teams
- San Francisco Giants (2003–2005)

Jesse William Foppert (/ˈfɒpərt/; born July 10, 1980) is an American former Major League Baseball pitcher.

== High school and collegiate career ==
Foppert attended San Rafael High School, where he was a two-time all-MCAL player as a shortstop. He then went to the University of San Francisco. He went 8–4 with a 3.75 ERA in 16 games during 2001. Foppert was then selected in the 2nd round (74th overall) by the San Francisco Giants in the 2001 Major League Baseball draft.

== Professional career ==
After immediately signing with the Giants, Foppert was assigned to the Salem-Keizer Volcanoes, the Giants Low Single A team. There, he went 8–1 with a 1.93 ERA in 14 starts and helped the Volcanoes make the playoffs. He was named the Volcanoes Player of the Month for July and August of that year. He helped the Volcanoes to the league title after pitching a 6-inning shutout with 12 strikeouts for the victory in the Northwest League postseason.

Foppert continued his quick rise through the Giants system. In 2002, he split the season between Double A Shreveport and Triple A Fresno. He led all of Giants minor leaguers with 183 strikeouts and was named to the Texas League All-Star game. He was the Giants minor league player of the year that year.

Foppert was ranked the 5th highest prospect by Baseball America and the best pitching prospect in 2003. He would be in the Giants starting rotation that season. He made one start for Fresno before having his contract purchased on April 10 when Ryan Jensen went on the disabled list. On April 14, he made his major league debut in relief. On April 22, he made his first major league start against the Pittsburgh Pirates, but got the loss as he only lasted 4 innings and gave up 5 runs. He would get his first major league win on May 3 against the Cincinnati Reds when he went 5 1/3 innings and gave up 4 runs.

On August 20, 2003, he was pulled from a start against the Atlanta Braves after pitching just 3 2/3 innings. He was diagnosed with neuritis in his right elbow. He then underwent Tommy John surgery in September 2003. He went 8–9 with a 5.03 ERA in 2003.

He would pitch in the final game of the 2004 season against the Los Angeles Dodgers. It would be his only game of that season. He pitched 1 inning of scoreless relief, striking out two.

Foppert spent the first two months of the 2005 with Fresno. He made 3 appearances (2 starts) in June for the Giants. On July 30, 2005, he was then traded to the Seattle Mariners along with catcher Yorvit Torrealba for outfielder Randy Winn. For the rest of the 2005 season, he would pitch for the Mariners Triple A team, the Tacoma Rainiers including 2 starts in the postseason for them.

Foppert played in just 5 games for the Rainiers in 2006 after spending most of the season on the disabled list.

Foppert was released on March 19, 2007 from the Mariners after failing to make the club as a nonroster invitee. He rejoined the Giants on March 24, 2007 when he was signed to a minor league contract. Foppert began the 2008 season with the Fresno Grizzlies of the Pacific Coast League. He became a free agent at the end of the season and re-signed with the Giants in December. In June 2009, the Giants released Foppert.

== Personal life ==
Foppert resides in Greenbrae with his wife, McKenna (the daughter of former NFL quarterback Craig Morton), and is the head coach at Marin Catholic High School in Kentfield. In the 2012/2013 season, his first as the varsity head coach, Foppert's Wildcats went 15–12. Jesse also runs the Jesse Foppert Pitching Academy, which is based in Kentfield.
