= José Jiménez (baseball) =

Dominican baseball player (born 1973)

- Pitcher
- Born: July 7, 1973 (age 53); San Pedro de Macoris, Dominican Republic
- Batted: Right Threw: Right

MLB debut
- September 9, 1998, for the St. Louis Cardinals

Last MLB appearance
- July 5, 2004, for the Cleveland Indians

MLB statistics
- Win–loss record: 24–44
- Earned run average: 4.92
- Strikeouts: 319
- Saves: 110
- Stats at Baseball Reference

Teams
- St. Louis Cardinals (1998–1999); Colorado Rockies (2000–2003); Cleveland Indians (2004)

Career highlights and awards
- Pitched a no-hitter on June 25, 1999

José Jiménez (born July 7, 1973) is a Dominican former professional baseball pitcher who played in Major League Baseball (MLB). He appeared in seven seasons from 1998 to 2004 for the St. Louis Cardinals, Colorado Rockies, and Cleveland Indians. The Cardinals signed him as an amateur free agent in his native Dominican Republic in 1991. Jiménez' career in MLB commenced as a starting pitcher with the Cardinals and he converted to relief pitching with the Rockies, saving more than 100 games.

As a rookie with the Cardinals in 1999, Jiménez pitched a no-hitter in the first of two consecutive starts defeating the Arizona Diamondbacks and future Hall of Famer Randy Johnson in 1−0 complete game shutouts. After converting to relief with the Rockies, he set club records for saves in a single season with 41 in 2002 and career with 102. Results were mixed in his last three seasons, as his earned run average in 2002 was 3.56 and he experienced consecutive season with 2−10 win–loss records and 1−7 in his final MLB season of 2004.

== St.Louis Cardinals ==
The Cardinals signed Jiménez as an amateur free agent in 1991.

=== Major League debut (1998) ===
The Cardinals first called Jiménez up to the major league roster in 1998, and he made his major league debut on against the Cincinnati Reds on September 9, 1998. He completed three innings pitched, allowing no earned runs, one hit and one walk with two strikeouts. Jiménez made four major league appearances with three starts in 1998, allowing seven earned runs in 21 1/3 innings for a 2.95 earned run average (ERA).

=== Rookie season and no-hitter (1999) ===
Still considered a rookie in 1999, Jiménez became a regular in the Cardinals' starting rotation. He pitched a no-hitter against eventual Hall of Famer Randy Johnson and the Arizona Diamondbacks on June 25, 1999. The Cardinals were victorious by a score of 1–0. He is one of the 24 rookie pitchers to have pitched a no-hitter in Major League history. For the week ending June 27, he earned National League Player of the Week honors. In Jiménez' second start after the no-hitter, he again faced Johnson and the Diamondbacks, winning a second consecutive complete game shutout decision by a 1−0 score while allowing two hits. The two starts against Johnson and the Diamondbacks were the only two shutouts of Jiménez' major league career. He finished the 1999 season with a 5−14 record and a 5.85 ERA in 29 appearances and 28 starts.

== Colorado Rockies ==
Jiménez was acquired by the 2000 season and became a staple in the Rockies bullpen, transitioning from starter to closer. From 2000-2003 he collected 102 saves for the Rockies, becoming the all-time saves leader in the Rockies franchise. He set a franchise record 41 saves in 2002, while having an ERA of 3.56 despite having a record of 2–10. The following season he swung back into a starter, making seven starts and 20 saves for the Rockies, but ballooned his ERA to 5.22 and again having a record of 2–10.

== Cleveland Indians ==
At 30 years old, he pitched in 2004 for the Indians; he would wind up released after going 1–7 with an 8.42 ERA.

== Post-Major League career ==
At the 2007 Pan-American Games, Jiménez tested positive for a banned substance and was subsequently removed from the competition.

== See also ==
- List of Colorado Rockies team records
- List of Major League Baseball no-hitters
- List of Major League Baseball players from the Dominican Republic

Preceded by David Wells	No-hitter pitcher June 25, 1999	Succeeded by David Cone
