= Félix Sánchez (baseball) =

Dominican baseball player (born 1981)

- Pitcher
- Born: August 3, 1981 (age 44); Puerto Plata, Dominican Republic
- Batted: Right Threw: Left

MLB debut
- September 3, 2003, for the Chicago Cubs

Last MLB appearance
- September 20, 2003, for the Chicago Cubs

MLB statistics
- Win–loss record: 0–0
- Earned run average: 10.80
- Strikeouts: 2
- Stats at Baseball Reference

Teams
- Chicago Cubs (2003)

Félix Antonio Sánchez (born August 3, 1981) is a Dominican former Major League Baseball pitcher who played in the major leagues briefly with the Chicago Cubs as a September callup in 2003.

With Double-A West Tenn in 2003, Sánchez had a 3.23 ERA in 30 games and was called up by the Cubs after rosters expanded in September. He appeared in 3 games and gave up 2 earned runs. On April 29, 2004, he was traded to the Detroit Tigers and spent the rest of the season with Double-A Erie. In 2005, he played for the High-A Lakeland Tigers in what would be his last professional season.
