= Kevin Jarvis =

American baseball player (born 1969)

- Pitcher
- Born: August 1, 1969 (age 56); Lexington, Kentucky, U.S.
- Batted: Left Threw: Right

Professional debut
- MLB: April 6, 1994, for the Cincinnati Reds
- NPB: April 8, 1998, for the Chunichi Dragons

Last appearance
- NPB: May 3, 1998, for the Chunichi Dragons
- MLB: September 24, 2006, for the Boston Red Sox

MLB statistics
- Win–loss record: 34–49
- Earned run average: 6.03
- Strikeouts: 453

NPB statistics
- Win–loss record: 1–2
- Earned run average: 4.41
- Strikeouts: 7
- Stats at Baseball Reference

Teams
- Cincinnati Reds (1994–1997); Detroit Tigers (1997); Minnesota Twins (1997); Chunichi Dragons (1998); Oakland Athletics (1999); Colorado Rockies (2000); San Diego Padres (2001–2003); Seattle Mariners (2004); Colorado Rockies (2004); St. Louis Cardinals (2005); Arizona Diamondbacks (2006); Boston Red Sox (2006)

Kevin Thomas Jarvis (born August 1, 1969) is an American former Major League Baseball pitcher. He played professionally for many teams including the Cincinnati Reds, Minnesota Twins, Detroit Tigers, Oakland Athletics, Colorado Rockies, San Diego Padres, Seattle Mariners, St. Louis Cardinals, the Arizona Diamondbacks and the Boston Red Sox. As of 2015, he is a scout for the Los Angeles Angels of Anaheim.

== Career ==
Jarvis was born in Lexington, Kentucky and graduated from Tates Creek High School in Lexington. He played college baseball at Wake Forest University. In 1989, he played collegiate summer baseball with the Harwich Mariners of the Cape Cod Baseball League, and returned to the league in 1990 to play for the Cotuit Kettleers.

Jarvis was drafted by the Cincinnati Reds in the 21st round of the 1991 Major League Baseball draft. He made his major league debut in the strike-affected 1994 season, posting a 1–1 record in 6 games from 17 2/3 innings pitched, playing for the Cincinnati Reds. He played with the Reds until 1997, posting an overall record of 12–15, before being claimed off waivers by the Detroit Tigers on May 2, but was claimed again by the Minnesota Twins just one week later. He played in 6 games for the Twins without a decision in any game and a 12.46 ERA, before the Tigers claimed him back off waivers on June 17. At the end of the season, Jarvis ended up with an 0–4 record from 27 games pitched.

In 1998, Jarvis moved to the Chunichi Dragons franchise in Japan, but only played in 4 games before signing a minor league contract with the Reds. 1999 saw Jarvis at the Oakland Athletics, but only amassed 4 games for them. But he did help the Triple-A affiliate of the A's, the Vancouver Canadians to the Triple-A World Championship posting an excellent record of 10–2, before winning game 2 of the Triple-A World Championship.

2000 saw the 5th different franchise of Jarvis' career - the Colorado Rockies. He pitched mainly as a starter, starting 19 of his 24 games played, posting a 3–4 record, from 115 innings pitched. 2001 saw the first of three seasons with the San Diego Padres, and was given the role of starting pitcher in every season. 2001 was by far his best major league season. He was 12–11 in 193 innings pitched with a 4.79 ERA, 133 strikeouts, and hit the only home run of his career (off Kent Bottenfield), but these numbers fell away, with the Padres (2002-2003), Seattle Mariners (2004), Rockies (2004), St. Louis Cardinals (2005), Diamondbacks (2006), and Boston Red Sox (2006).

== Personal life ==
Jarvis is married to Elizabeth and they have two children (Bryce and Kennedy). Prior to joining the Angels' scouting staff, Jarvis held a similar post with the San Diego Padres. His son Bryce is a pitcher for the Arizona Diamondbacks of Major League Baseball.
