= Nelson Cruz (pitcher) =

Dominican baseball player (born 1972)

- Pitcher
- Born: September 13, 1972 (age 53); Puerto Plata, Dominican Republic
- Batted: Right Threw: Right

MLB debut
- August 1, 1997, for the Chicago White Sox

Last MLB appearance
- July 9, 2003, for the Colorado Rockies

MLB statistics
- Win–loss record: 15–23
- Earned run average: 5.04
- Strikeouts: 277
- Stats at Baseball Reference

Teams
- Chicago White Sox (1997); Detroit Tigers (1999–2000); Houston Astros (2001–2002); Colorado Rockies (2003)

Nelson Cruz (born September 13, 1972) is a Dominican former professional baseball pitcher. He played all or parts of six seasons in Major League Baseball (MLB) for the Chicago White Sox, Detroit Tigers, Houston Astros, and Colorado Rockies, and one season in Korea Professional Baseball for the SK Wyverns.

== Career ==
He was signed by the Montreal Expos as an amateur free agent in 1989. Cruz played his first professional season with their Rookie league Gulf Coast Expos in 1991, and his last affiliated season with the Detroit Tigers' Triple-A Toledo Mud Hens in 2005. He finished his career with the Toros de Tijuana of the Mexican League in 2006.
