= Mike DeJean =

American baseball player (born 1970)

- Pitcher
- Born: September 28, 1970 (age 55); Baton Rouge, Louisiana, U.S.
- Batted: Right Threw: Right

MLB debut
- May 2, 1997, for the Colorado Rockies

Last MLB appearance
- April 7, 2006, for the Colorado Rockies

MLB statistics
- Win–loss record: 30–33
- Earned run average: 4.30
- Strikeouts: 446
- Stats at Baseball Reference

Teams
- Colorado Rockies (1997–2000); Milwaukee Brewers (2001–2003); St. Louis Cardinals (2003); Baltimore Orioles (2004); New York Mets (2004–2005); Colorado Rockies (2005–2006)

Michael Dwain DeJean (/ˈdeɪʒɒn/; born September 28, 1970) is an American former right-handed relief pitcher in Major League Baseball.

== Career ==
DeJean played shortstop during his college career at Mississippi Delta Community College and Livingston University. In 1992, while playing for Livingston in the Division II College World Series, DeJean pitched to two batters, retiring both. He was selected in the 24th round of the 1992 amateur draft by the New York Yankees and signed to a professional contract as a pitcher.

The Yankees traded DeJean to the Colorado Rockies for Joe Girardi after the 1995 season. He made his major league debut on May 2, 1997, pitching a scoreless inning in relief against the Philadelphia Phillies. DeJean achieved modest success as a closer for the Milwaukee Brewers in 2001 and 2002, but struggled mightily during brief tenures with the St. Louis Cardinals and Baltimore Orioles. He was named National League Player of the Week for May 26 through June 1, 2003. He was traded to the New York Mets during the 2004 season, but was released in June 2005. With the Mets, DeJean posted 3–1 record and 6.31 ERA. In July 2005, DeJean signed with the Rockies, re-joining the team that he began his career with in 1997. With the Rockies, DeJean posted 2–3 record and 3.19 ERA in 38 games, all in relief.

On October 27, 2005, the Rockies announced they signed DeJean to a one-year contract, guaranteeing him $1.3 million ($1.15 million in base salary and $150,000 on a mutual option of $1.5 million salary in 2007). He appeared in 20 games for AAA Colorado Springs Sky Sox on an injury rehab assignment, but was released before making an appearance with the major league club. After signing a minor league contract with the Houston Astros during the 2007-2008 off-season, Dejean was released before appearing in a game.

DeJean is married with two children and resides in West Monroe, Louisiana.
