= Rule 5 draft results =

List of Major League Baseball player drafts

Below are lists of Rule 5 draft results since 1997. Players selected in the Major League Baseball (MLB) phase of the Rule 5 draft must be kept on their new team's active roster for the entire following MLB season, or they are placed on waivers and offered back to their original team if not claimed. Players chosen in the Minor League Baseball phase(s) of the Rule 5 draft remain with their new organization without restrictions.

The Rule 5 draft has happened every year since 1920. The 2021 MLB lockout led to the postponement of the major league phase of the Rule 5 draft, but the minor league phase proceeded as scheduled.

== Key ==
Pos	Position
C	Catcher
1B	First baseman
2B	Second baseman
3B	Third baseman
SS	Shortstop
IF	Infielder
OF	Outfielder
RHP	Right-handed pitcher
LHP	Left-handed pitcher

== Results ==
All Star Selection

=== 2025 ===
Major league phase

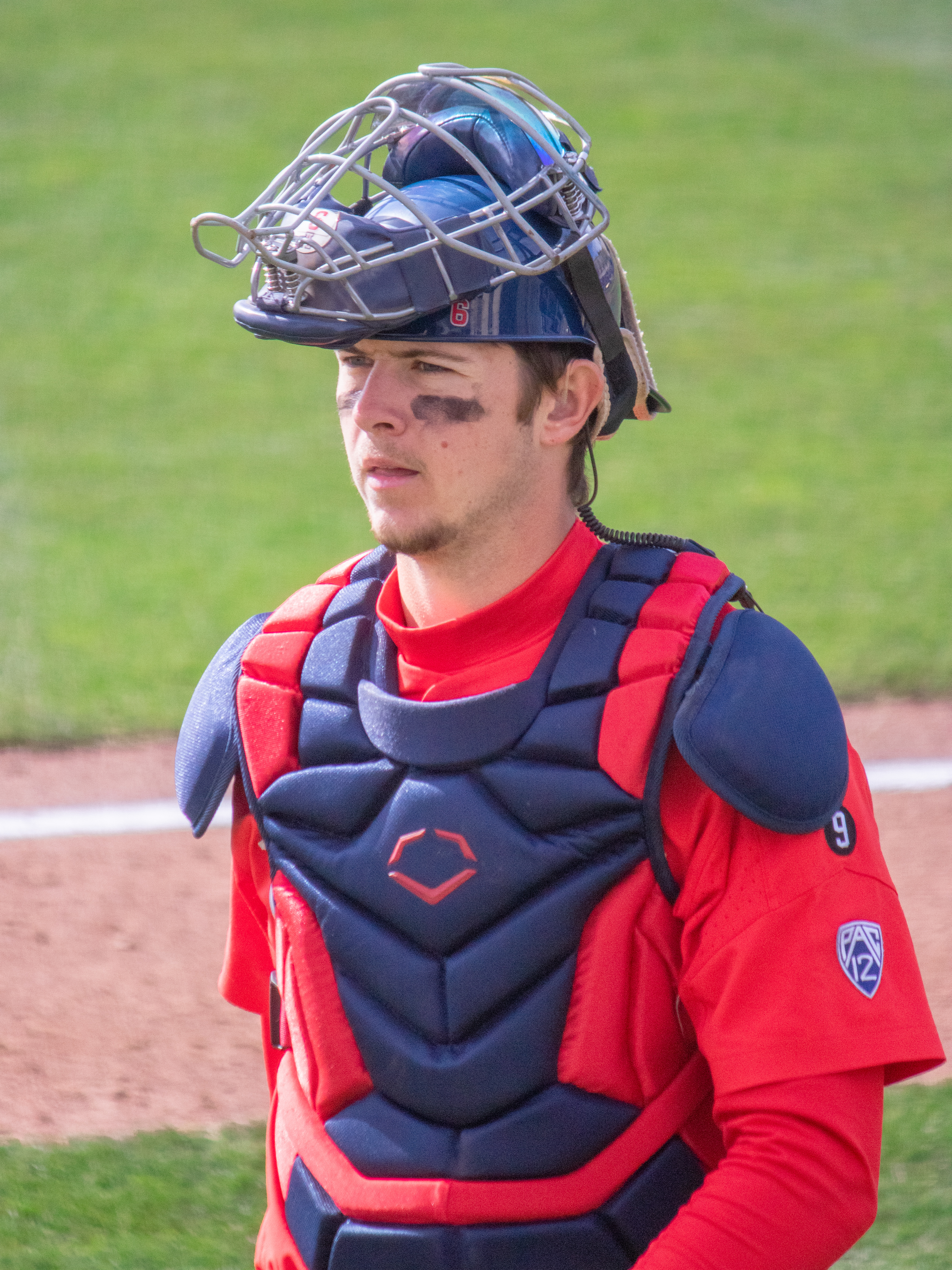
Daniel Susac in 2022

Pick	By	Player	Pos	From	Notes
1	Colorado Rockies	RJ Petit	RHP	Detroit Tigers	Returned to Detroit on November 3
2	Chicago White Sox	Jedixson Páez	RHP	Boston Red Sox	Returned to Boston on April 4, added to Boston's active roster September 1
3	Washington Nationals	Griff McGarry	RHP	Philadelphia Phillies	Returned to Philadelphia on March 24
4	Minnesota Twins	Daniel Susac	C	Athletics	Traded to San Francisco
5	Pittsburgh Pirates	Carter Baumler	RHP	Baltimore Orioles	Traded to Texas
6	Athletics	Ryan Watson	RHP	San Francisco Giants	Traded to Boston, claimed by Angels off waivers August 7
7	St. Louis Cardinals	Matt Pushard	RHP	Miami Marlins	Returned to Marlins on June 3
8	Houston Astros	Roddery Muñoz	RHP	Cincinnati Reds	Outrighted to AAA Sugar Land on April 9 after Cincinnati declined his return
9	Cleveland Guardians	Peyton Pallette	RHP	Chicago White Sox	Returned to Chicago on May 30
10	Toronto Blue Jays	Spencer Miles	RHP	San Francisco Giants	
11	New York Yankees	Cade Winquest	RHP	St. Louis Cardinals	Returned to Cardinals on April 13
12	Philadelphia Phillies	Zach McCambley	RHP	Miami Marlins	Returned to Marlins on March 22
13	Chicago White Sox	Alexander Alberto	RHP	Tampa Bay Rays	Returned to Rays on March 19

Notable players chosen in the minor league phase (in order of selection)

- TJ Shook, RHP, Colorado Rockies from the New York Mets
- Cole Phillips, RHP, Milwaukee Brewers from the Seattle Mariners
- Justin Armbruester, RHP, New York Mets from the Baltimore Orioles
- Ryan Murphy, RHP, St. Louis Cardinals from the San Francisco Giants

=== 2024 ===
Major league phase

Pick	By	Player	Pos	From	Notes
1	Chicago White Sox	Shane Smith	RHP	Milwaukee Brewers	
2	Miami Marlins	Liam Hicks	C	Detroit Tigers	
3	Los Angeles Angels	Garrett McDaniels	LHP	Los Angeles Dodgers	Returned to the Dodgers on June 14.
4	Athletics	Noah Murdock	RHP	Kansas City Royals	Returned to the Royals on May 12.
5	Washington Nationals	Evan Reifert	RHP	Tampa Bay Rays	Returned to the Rays on March 18.
6	Toronto Blue Jays	Angel Bastardo	RHP	Boston Red Sox	Spent entire 2025 season on injured list, returned to the Red Sox on April 1, 2026.
7	Cincinnati Reds	Cooper Bowman	2B	Athletics	Returned to the Athletics on March 12.
8	Tampa Bay Rays	Nate Lavender	LHP	New York Mets	Returned to the Mets on November 12.
9	Minnesota Twins	Eiberson Castellano	RHP	Philadelphia Phillies	Returned to the Phillies on March 25.
10	Chicago Cubs	Gage Workman	SS	Detroit Tigers	Traded to the Chicago White Sox on April 26. Returned to Tigers on May 14.
11	Atlanta Braves	Anderson Pilar	RHP	Miami Marlins	Returned to the Marlins on March 19.
12	San Diego Padres	Juan Núñez	RHP	Baltimore Orioles	Returned to the Orioles on March 25.
13	Milwaukee Brewers	Connor Thomas	LHP	St. Louis Cardinals	
14	Philadelphia Phillies	Mike Vasil	RHP	New York Mets	Traded to the Rays on December 11. Claimed off waivers by the White Sox on March 23.
15	Atlanta Braves	Christian Cairo	SS	Cleveland Guardians	Returned to the Guardians on March 19.

Minor league phase (in order of selection)

- Hyun-il Choi, RHP, Washington Nationals from the Los Angeles Dodgers
- Hobie Harris, RHP, Boston Red Sox from the New York Mets
- Will Wilson, SS, Cleveland Guardians from the San Francisco Giants
- John Rhodes, OF, Los Angeles Dodgers from the Baltimore Orioles
- Jack Winkler, IF, Miami Marlins from the Oakland Athletics
- Landon Marceaux, RHP, Kansas City Royals from the New York Mets
- Zach Peek, RHP, Milwaukee Brewers from the Baltimore Orioles
- Randy Labaut, LHP, Pittsburgh Pirates from the Cleveland Guardians
- Jack Anderson, RHP, Boston Red Sox from the Detroit Tigers
- Matt Cronin, LHP, Seattle Mariners from the Washington Nationals
- Nick Swiney, LHP, Houston Astros from the San Francisco Giants
- Dan Hammer, RHP, Tampa Bay Rays from the Baltimore Orioles

=== 2023 ===
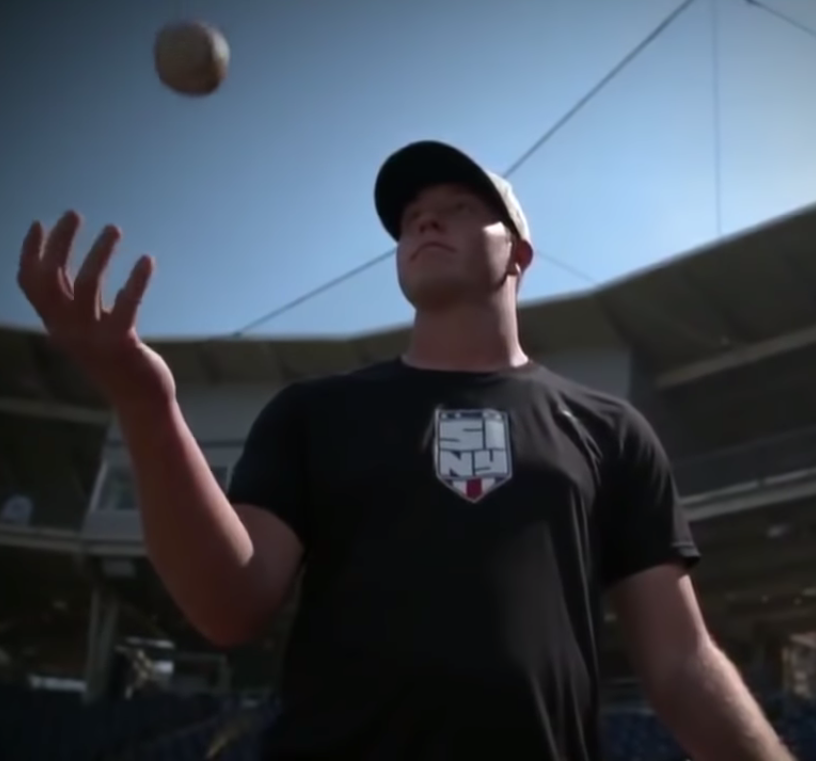
Matt Sauer in 2018

Major league phase

Pick	By	Player	Pos	From	Notes
1	Oakland Athletics	Mitch Spence	RHP	New York Yankees	
2	Kansas City Royals	Matt Sauer	RHP	New York Yankees	Returned to the Yankees on May 26.
3	Colorado Rockies	Anthony Molina	RHP	Tampa Bay Rays	
4	Chicago White Sox	Shane Drohan	LHP	Boston Red Sox	Returned to the Red Sox on June 12.
5	Washington Nationals	Nasim Nuñez	SS	Miami Marlins	
6	St. Louis Cardinals	Ryan Fernandez	RHP	Boston Red Sox	
7	New York Mets	Justin Slaten	RHP	Texas Rangers	Traded to the Red Sox on December 6, 2023.
8	Cleveland Guardians	Deyvison De Los Santos	3B	Arizona Diamondbacks	Returned to the Diamondbacks on March 23, 2024.
9	San Diego Padres	Stephen Kolek	RHP	Seattle Mariners	
10	Texas Rangers	Carson Coleman	RHP	New York Yankees	Returned to the Yankees on November 19, 2024.

Notable players chosen in the minor league phase (in order of selection)

- Eric Wagaman, 1B, Los Angeles Angels from the New York Yankees
- Mickey Gasper, C, Boston Red Sox from the New York Yankees
- T. J. Sikkema, LHP, Cincinnati Reds from the Kansas City Royals
- Clay Dungan, SS, San Diego Padres from the Kansas City Royals
- Tyler Thomas, LHP, Atlanta Braves from the New York Mets
- Ryan Miller, RHP Los Angeles Angels from the Boston Red Sox
- Seth Beer, 1B, Pittsburgh Pirates from the Arizona Diamondbacks
- Connor Gillispie, RHP, Cleveland Guardians from the Baltimore Orioles
- Omar Cruz, LHP, San Diego Padres from the Pittsburgh Pirates
- Kervin Castro, RHP, New York Yankees from the Houston Astros
- Ryan Fitzgerald, 2B, Kansas City Royals from the Boston Red Sox
- Daison Acosta, RHP, Washington Nationals from the New York Mets
- John Doxakis, LHP, Cleveland Guardians from the Tampa Bay Rays
- Levi Jordan, SS, Cincinnati Reds from the Chicago Cubs
- Bryce Ball, 1B, Philadelphia Phillies from the Cleveland Guardians

=== 2022 ===
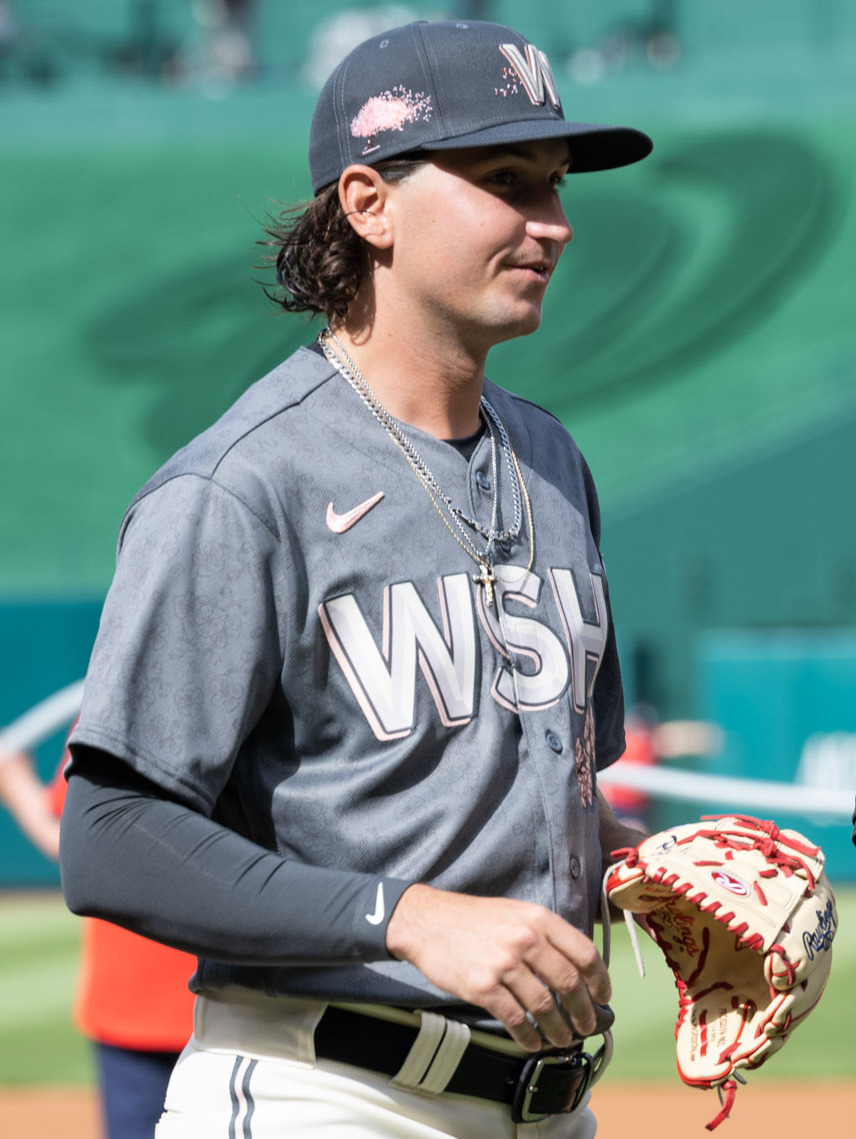
Thaddeus Ward in 2023

Major league phase

Pick	By	Player	Pos	From	Notes
1	Washington Nationals	Thaddeus Ward	RHP	Boston Red Sox	
2	Oakland Athletics	Ryan Noda	1B	Los Angeles Dodgers	
3	Pittsburgh Pirates	José Hernández	LHP	Los Angeles Dodgers	
4	Cincinnati Reds	Blake Sabol	OF	Pittsburgh Pirates	Traded to the San Francisco Giants
5	Detroit Tigers	Mason Englert	RHP	Texas Rangers	
6	Colorado Rockies	Kevin Kelly	RHP	Cleveland Guardians	Traded to the Tampa Bay Rays
7	Miami Marlins	Nic Enright	RHP	Cleveland Guardians	Returned to the Guardians on June 1
8	Chicago White Sox	Nick Avila	RHP	San Francisco Giants	Returned to the Giants on March 28
9	Baltimore Orioles	Andrew Politi	RHP	Boston Red Sox	Returned to Red Sox on March 28
10	Milwaukee Brewers	Gus Varland	RHP	Los Angeles Dodgers	Returned to Dodgers on May 22
11	Philadelphia Phillies	Noah Song	RHP	Boston Red Sox	Returned to Red Sox on August 4
12	San Diego Padres	José López	LHP	Tampa Bay Rays	Returned to Rays on March 26
13	Seattle Mariners	Chris Clarke	RHP	Chicago Cubs	Returned to Cubs on March 26
14	St. Louis Cardinals	Wilking Rodríguez	RHP	New York Yankees	Spent entire season on injured list, released and re-signed to minor league contract November 21
15	New York Mets	Zach Greene	RHP	New York Yankees	Returned to Yankees on March 14

Notable players chosen in the minor league phase (in order of selection)

- Wei-Chieh Huang, RHP, Pittsburgh Pirates from the San Francisco Giants
- Dane Myers, 3B, Miami Marlins from the Detroit Tigers
- Taylor Rashi, RHP, Arizona Diamondbacks from the San Francisco Giants
- Joe Jacques, LHP, Boston Red Sox from the Pittsburgh Pirates
- Evan Mendoza, 3B, San Diego Padres from the St. Louis Cardinals
- Héctor Pérez, RHP, Tampa Bay Rays from the Baltimore Orioles
- Josh Palacios, OF, Pittsburgh Pirates from the Washington Nationals
- Jared Oliva, OF, Los Angeles Angels from the Pittsburgh Pirates
- Nick Burdi, RHP, Chicago Cubs from the San Diego Padres
- Trey McGough, LHP, Baltimore Orioles from the Pittsburgh Pirates
- Logan Warmoth, SS, Seattle Mariners from the Toronto Blue Jays
- Bryan King, LHP, Houston Astros from the Chicago Cubs
- Peter Solomon, RHP, Arizona Diamondbacks from the Pittsburgh Pirates
- Jonathan Araúz, 2B, New York Mets from the Baltimore Orioles
- Josh Stowers, OF, Los Angeles Dodgers from the Texas Rangers
- Mateo Gil, SS, New York Mets from the Colorado Rockies
- Oliver Dunn, 2B, Philadelphia Phillies from the New York Yankees
- Isaac Collins, 2B, Milwaukee Brewers from the Colorado Rockies
- Ryan Miller, RHP, Boston Red Sox from the New York Yankees
- Bradley Hanner, RHP, Cleveland Guardians from Minnesota Twins

=== 2021 ===
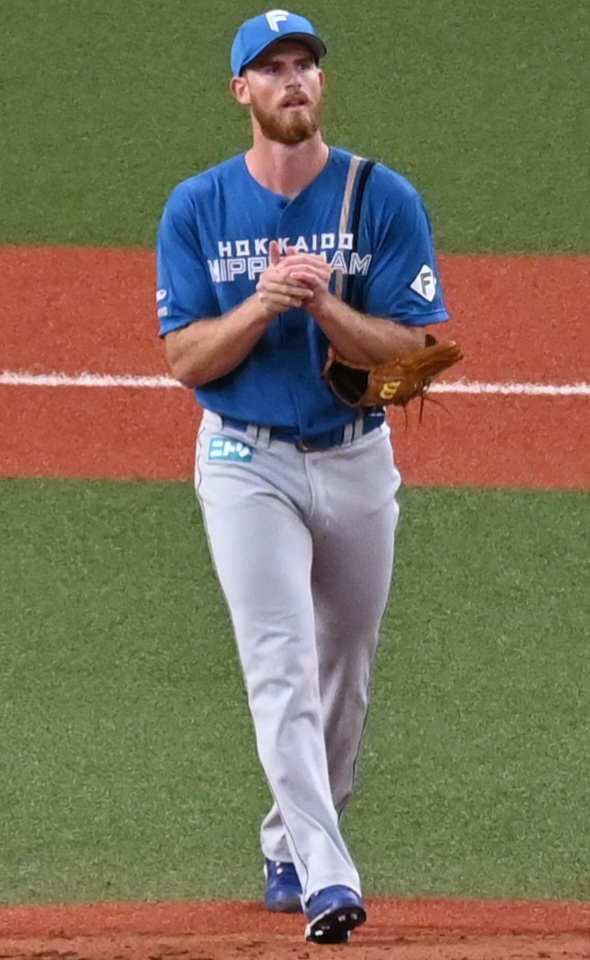
Conner Menez in 2022

The major league phase of the Rule 5 draft following the 2021 season was postponed due to the 2021 MLB lockout. When the lockout was resolved, the draft was cancelled.

Notable players chosen in the minor league phase (in order of selection)

- Nolan Hoffman, RHP, Baltimore Orioles from the Seattle Mariners
- Andrew Young, 2B, Washington Nationals from the Arizona Diamondbacks
- Charles Leblanc, IF, Miami Marlins from the Texas Rangers
- Conner Menez, LHP, Chicago Cubs from the San Francisco Giants
- Elvis Alvarado, RHP Detroit Tigers from the Seattle Mariners
- Kenny Rosenberg, LHP, Los Angeles Angels from the Tampa Bay Rays
- Erik Sabrowski, LHP, Cleveland Guardians from the San Diego Padres
- Matt Seelinger, RHP, Philadelphia Phillies from the San Francisco Giants
- Ronnie Dawson, OF, Cincinnati Reds from the Houston Astros
- John Nogowski, 1B, Atlanta Braves from the San Francisco Giants
- Ben DeLuzio, OF, St. Louis Cardinals from the Arizona Diamondbacks
- Caleb Boushley, RHP, Milwaukee Brewers from the San Diego Padres
- Cole Uvila, RHP, Baltimore Orioles from the Texas Rangers
- Curtis Taylor, RHP, Washington Nationals from the Toronto Blue Jays
- Robert Garcia, LHP, Miami Marlins from the Kansas City Royals
- Brian Keller, RHP, Boston Red Sox from the New York Yankees
- Carson Fulmer, RHP, Los Angeles Dodgers from the Cincinnati Reds
- Allan Winans, RHP, Atlanta Braves from the New York Mets
- Jon Duplantier, RHP, Los Angeles Dodgers from the San Francisco Giants
- Luarbert Arias, RHP, Miami Marlins from the San Diego Padres
- Tanner Andrews, RHP, Atlanta Braves from the Miami Marlins

=== 2020 ===
Major league phase

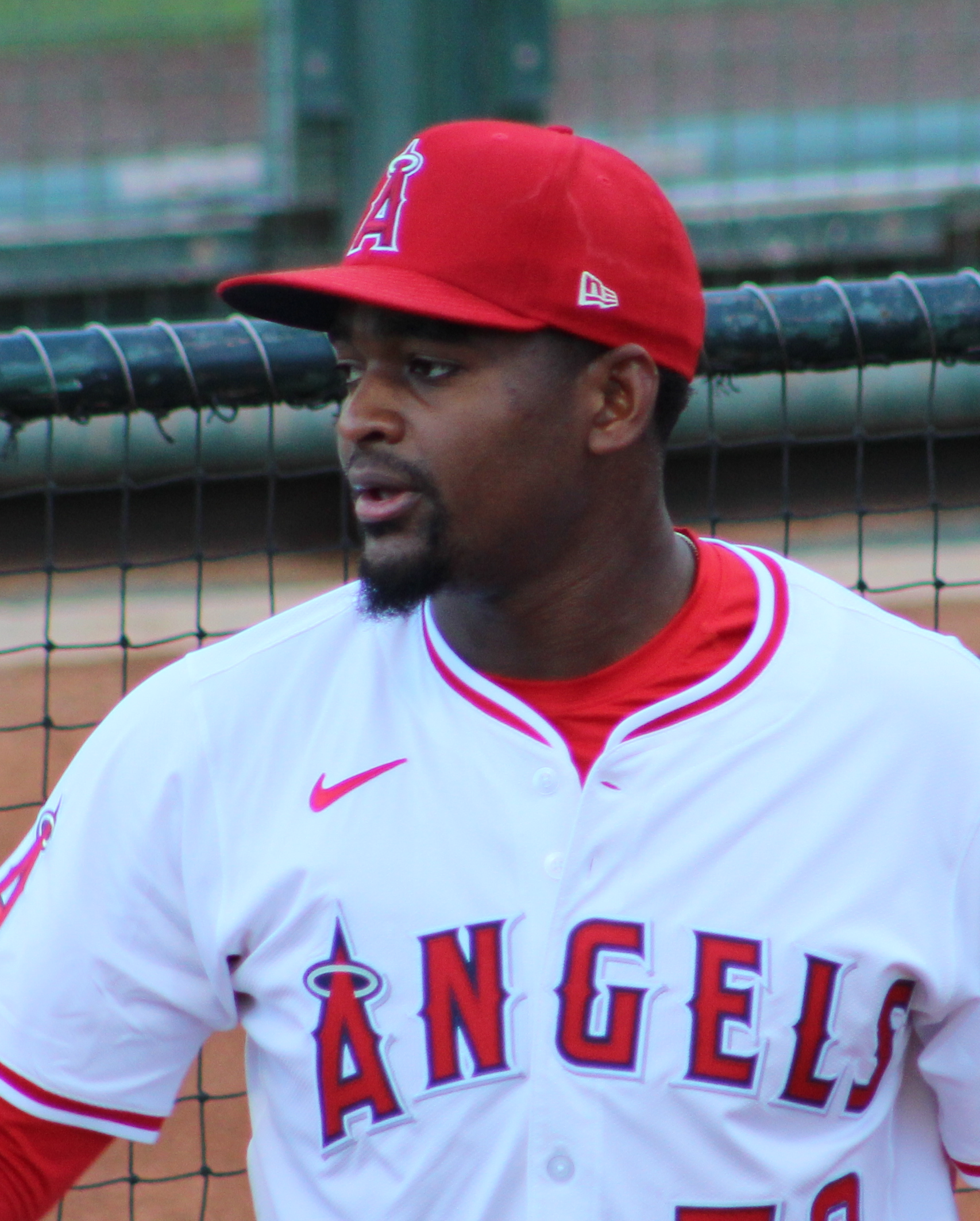
José Soriano in 2025

Pick	By	Player	Pos	From	Notes
1	Pittsburgh Pirates	José Soriano	RHP	Los Angeles Angels	Spent entire season on injured list, returned to Angels on November 14
2	Texas Rangers	Brett de Geus	RHP	Los Angeles Dodgers	Claimed off waivers by the Arizona Diamondbacks on June 25
3	Detroit Tigers	Akil Baddoo	OF	Minnesota Twins	
4	Boston Red Sox	Garrett Whitlock	RHP	New York Yankees	
5	Baltimore Orioles	Mac Sceroler	RHP	Cincinnati Reds	Returned to Reds on June 26
6	Arizona Diamondbacks	Zach Pop	RHP	Baltimore Orioles	Traded to the Miami Marlins
7	Colorado Rockies	Jordan Sheffield	RHP	Los Angeles Dodgers	
8	Los Angeles Angels	José Alberto Rivera	RHP	Houston Astros	Returned to Astros on March 24
9	New York Mets	Luis Oviedo	RHP	Cleveland Indians	Traded to the Pittsburgh Pirates
10	Seattle Mariners	Will Vest	RHP	Detroit Tigers	Returned to Tigers on July 17
11	Philadelphia Phillies	Kyle Holder	SS	New York Yankees	Traded to the Cincinnati Reds, returned to Yankees on March 30.
12	San Francisco Giants	Dedniel Núñez	RHP	New York Mets	Spent entire season on injured list, returned to Mets on November 19
13	Miami Marlins	Paul Campbell	RHP	Tampa Bay Rays	
14	Chicago Cubs	Gray Fenter	RHP	Baltimore Orioles	Returned to Orioles on March 12
15	Cleveland Indians	Trevor Stephan	RHP	New York Yankees	
16	Oakland Athletics	Ka'ai Tom	OF	Cleveland Indians	Claimed off waivers by the Pittsburgh Pirates on April 21. Designated for assignment on August 16 and outrighted to Triple-A after Indians declined to take him back. Released by Pirates on September 20.
17	Baltimore Orioles	Tyler Wells	RHP	Minnesota Twins	
18	Oakland Athletics	Dany Jiménez	RHP	Toronto Blue Jays	Returned to Blue Jays on March 15

Notable players chosen in the minor league phase

- Shea Spitzbarth, RHP, Pittsburgh Pirates from the Los Angeles Dodgers
- Tyler Gilbert, LHP, Arizona Diamondbacks from the Los Angeles Dodgers
- Brendon Davis, IF, Los Angeles Angels from the Texas Rangers
- Jake Fishman, LHP, Miami Marlins from the Toronto Blue Jays
- Matt Krook, LHP, New York Yankees from the Tampa Bay Rays
- Nicholas Padilla, RHP, Chicago Cubs from the Tampa Bay Rays
- Chris Roller, OF, Cleveland Indians from the Los Angeles Dodgers
- A.J. Puckett, RHP, Atlanta Braves from the Chicago White Sox
- Zach Jackson, RHP, Oakland Athletics from the Toronto Blue Jays
- Reggie McClain, RHP, New York Yankees from the Philadelphia Phillies
- Brett Graves, RHP, Oakland Athletics from the Miami Marlins
- Drew Jackson, 2B, New York Mets from the Los Angeles Dodgers
- Chuckie Robinson, C, Cincinnati Reds from the Houston Astros
- Yohel Pozo, C/DH, Texas Rangers from San Diego Padres
- Kaleb Ort, RHP, Boston Red Sox from the New York Yankees
- Gustavo Campero, C, Los Angeles Angels from the New York Yankees
- Ronnie Williams, RHP, San Francisco Giants from the St. Louis Cardinals
- Seth Martinez, RHP, Houston Astros from the Oakland Athletics
- Steven Leyton, SS, Cincinnati Reds from the Arizona Diamondbacks

=== 2019 ===
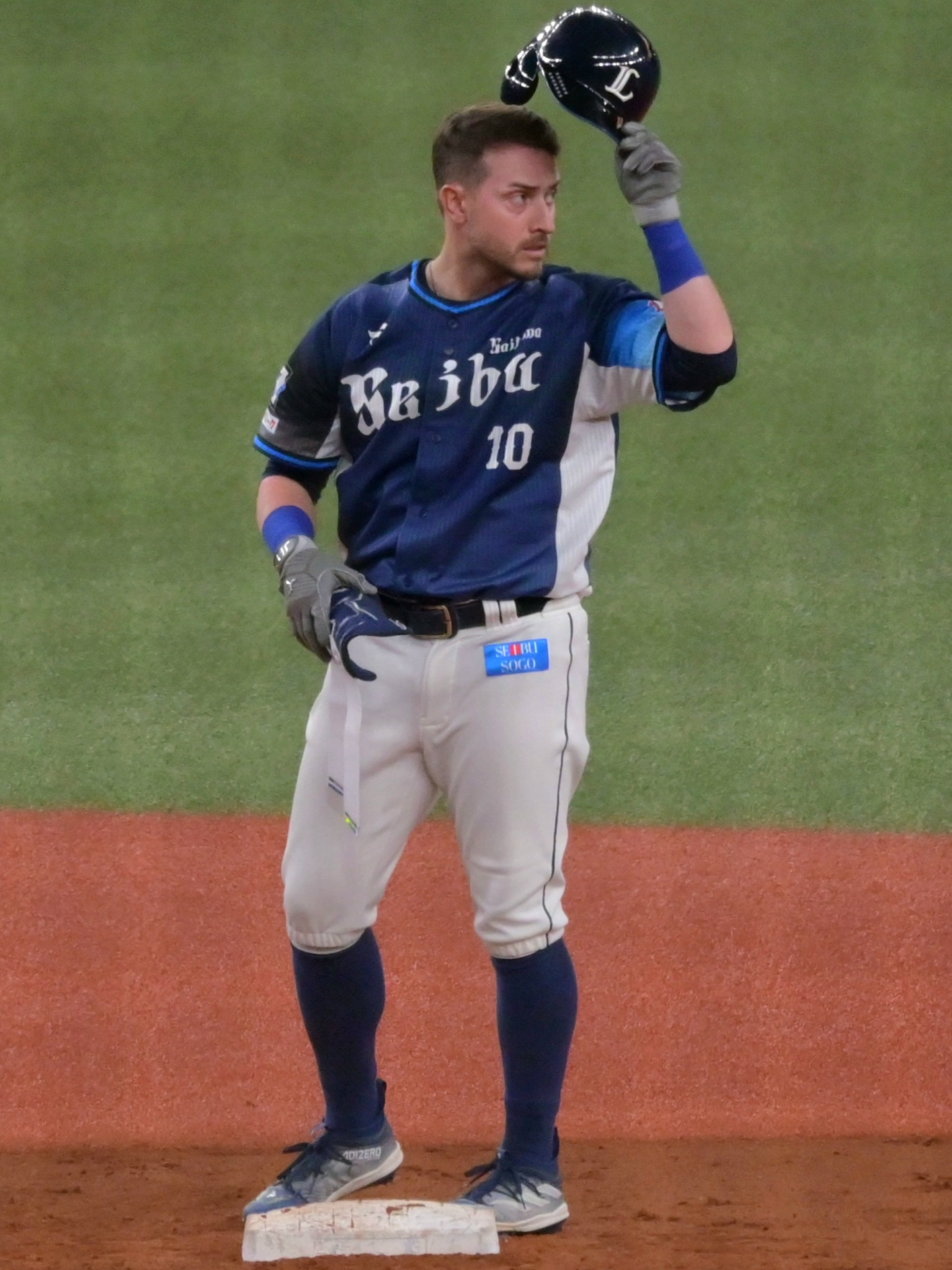
Mark Payton in 2023

Major league phase

Pick	By	Player	Pos	From	Notes
1	Detroit Tigers	Rony García	RHP	New York Yankees	
2	Baltimore Orioles	Brandon Bailey	RHP	Houston Astros	Returned to Astros
3	Miami Marlins	Sterling Sharp	RHP	Washington Nationals	Returned to Nationals
4	Kansas City Royals	Stephen Woods Jr.	RHP	Tampa Bay Rays	Returned to Rays, then traded back to Royals
5	Seattle Mariners	Yohan Ramírez	RHP	Houston Astros	
6	Cincinnati Reds	Mark Payton	OF	Oakland Athletics	Returned to Athletics, then traded back to Reds
7	San Francisco Giants	Dany Jiménez	RHP	Toronto Blue Jays	Returned to Blue Jays
8	Philadelphia Phillies	Vimael Machín	IF	Chicago Cubs	Traded to the Oakland Athletics
9	Chicago Cubs	Trevor Megill	RHP	San Diego Padres	Returned to Padres, then traded back to Cubs
10	Boston Red Sox	Jonathan Araúz	IF	Houston Astros	
11	Baltimore Orioles	Michael Rucker	RHP	Chicago Cubs	Returned to Cubs

Notable players chosen in the minor league phase

- Hobie Harris, RHP, Toronto Blue Jays from the New York Yankees
- Brian O'Keefe, C, Seattle Mariners from the St. Louis Cardinals
- Bryan Torres, C, San Francisco Giants from the Milwaukee Brewers
- Brock Stewart, RHP, Chicago Cubs from the Toronto Blue Jays
- Raynel Espinal, RHP, Boston Red Sox from the New York Yankees
- Adam Oller, RHP, New York Mets from the San Francisco Giants
- Danny Young, LHP, Cleveland Indians from the Toronto Blue Jays
- Jason Krizan, OF, Oakland Athletics from the New York Mets
- José Espada, RHP, Boston Red Sox from the Toronto Blue Jays
- Jacob Bosiokovic, RHP, St. Louis Cardinals from the Colorado Rockies

=== 2018 ===
Major league phase

Pick	By	Player	Pos	From	Notes
1	Baltimore Orioles	Richie Martin	SS	Oakland Athletics	
2	Kansas City Royals	Sam McWilliams	RHP	Tampa Bay Rays	Returned to the Rays
3	Chicago White Sox	Jordan Romano	RHP	Toronto Blue Jays	Traded to the Texas Rangers, and returned to the Blue Jays
4	Miami Marlins	Riley Ferrell	RHP	Houston Astros	Returned to the Astros
5	Detroit Tigers	Reed Garrett	RHP	Texas Rangers	Returned to the Rangers
6	Cincinnati Reds	Connor Joe	IF/OF	Los Angeles Dodgers	Traded to the San Francisco Giants, and returned to the Dodgers
7	Texas Rangers	Chris Ellis	RHP	St. Louis Cardinals	Traded to the Royals, returned to the Cardinals
8	San Francisco Giants	Travis Bergen	LHP	Toronto Blue Jays	Returned to Blue Jays.
9	Toronto Blue Jays	Elvis Luciano	RHP	Kansas City Royals	
10	New York Mets	Kyle Dowdy	RHP	Cleveland Indians	Claimed by Rangers, and returned to Cleveland on July 28, 2019.
11	Philadelphia Phillies	Drew Jackson	SS	Los Angeles Dodgers	Traded to the Baltimore Orioles in exchange for international bonus slot money, and returned to the Dodgers
12	Arizona Diamondbacks	Nick Green	RHP	New York Yankees	Returned to the Yankees
13	Seattle Mariners	Brandon Brennan	RHP	Colorado Rockies	
14	San Francisco Giants	Drew Ferguson	OF	Houston Astros	Returned to the Astros

Notable players chosen in the minor league phase

- Braxton Lee, OF, New York Mets from the Miami Marlins
- Dusten Knight, P, Minnesota Twins from the San Francisco Giants
- Ryan Thompson, P, Tampa Bay Rays from Houston Astros
- Luis Lugo, LHP, Chicago Cubs from the Kansas City Royals
- Corban Joseph, 2B, Oakland Athletics from the Baltimore Orioles
- Sam Moll, RHP, San Francisco Giants from the Toronto Blue Jays
- Mark Payton, OF, Oakland Athletics from the New York Yankees
- Chris Mazza, RHP, New York Mets from the Seattle Mariners
- Ian Gardeck, RHP, Tampa Bay Rays from the San Francisco Giants

=== 2017 ===
Major league phase

Pick	By	Player	Pos	From	Notes
1	Detroit Tigers	Víctor Reyes	OF	Arizona Diamondbacks	
2	San Francisco Giants	Julián Fernández	RHP	Colorado Rockies	Spent entire season on the disabled list, traded to the Miami Marlins, spent another season on the disabled list, returned to Rockies
3	Philadelphia Phillies	Nick Burdi	RHP	Minnesota Twins	Traded to the Pittsburgh Pirates, started the season on the disabled list
4	Chicago White Sox	Carlos Tocci	OF	Philadelphia Phillies	Traded to the Texas Rangers, made the Rangers' Opening Day roster
5	Cincinnati Reds	Brad Keller	RHP	Arizona Diamondbacks	Traded to the Kansas City Royals
6	New York Mets	Burch Smith	RHP	Tampa Bay Rays	Traded to the Kansas City Royals
7	Atlanta Braves	Anyelo Gómez	RHP	New York Yankees	Returned to the Yankees
8	Pittsburgh Pirates	Jordan Milbrath	RHP	Cleveland Indians	Returned to the Indians
9	Baltimore Orioles	Néstor Cortés Jr.	LHP	New York Yankees	Made the Orioles' Opening Day roster, returned to the Yankees on April 13
10	Miami Marlins	Elieser Hernández	RHP	Houston Astros	
11	Seattle Mariners	Mike Ford	1B	New York Yankees	Returned to the Yankees
12	Los Angeles Angels	Luke Bard	RHP	Minnesota Twins	Made the Angels' Opening Day roster, returned to Twins on April 27
13	Minnesota Twins	Tyler Kinley	RHP	Miami Marlins	Made the Twins' Opening Day roster, designated for assignment on April 26 and returned to Marlins
14	Arizona Diamondbacks	Albert Suárez	RHP	San Francisco Giants	
15	Houston Astros	Anthony Gose	LHP/OF	Texas Rangers	Returned to the Rangers
16	Baltimore Orioles	Pedro Araújo	RHP	Chicago Cubs	Made the Orioles' Opening Day roster, designated for assignment on April 3, 2019, returned to the Cubs, traded to Orioles
17	Miami Marlins	Brett Graves	RHP	Oakland Athletics	
18	Baltimore Orioles	José Mesa Jr.	RHP	New York Yankees	Returned to the Yankees

Minor league phase

- Yermín Mercedes, C, Chicago White Sox from the Baltimore Orioles
- Mitch Nay, 3B, Cincinnati Reds from the Toronto Blue Jays
- Damien Magnifico, RHP, Pittsburgh Pirates from the Los Angeles Angels
- Martin Červenka, C, Baltimore Orioles from the San Francisco Giants
- Joseph Odom, C, Seattle Mariners from the Atlanta Braves
- Locke St. John, LHP, Texas Rangers from the Detroit Tigers
- Daniel Duarte, RHP, Kansas City Royals from the Texas Rangers
- Jacob Wilson, 2B, Washington Nationals from the St. Louis Cardinals
- R. C. Orlan, RHP, Cleveland Indians from the Washington Nationals
- Tyler Smith, SS, Atlanta Braves from the Texas Rangers
- Iván Castillo, IF/OF, Toronto Blue Jays from the Cleveland Indians

=== 2016 ===
Major League phase

Pick	By	Player	Pos	From	Notes
1	Minnesota Twins	Miguel Díaz	RHP	Milwaukee Brewers	Traded to the San Diego Padres
2	Cincinnati Reds	Luis Torrens	C	New York Yankees	Traded to the San Diego Padres
3	San Diego Padres	Allen Córdoba	SS	St. Louis Cardinals	Made the Padres' Opening Day roster
4	Tampa Bay Rays	Kevin Gadea	RHP	Seattle Mariners	Started the season on the disabled list, waived and released in August 2019
5	Atlanta Braves	Armando Rivero	RHP	Chicago Cubs	Started the season on the disabled list
6	Arizona Diamondbacks	Tyler Jones	RHP	New York Yankees	Returned to the Yankees
7	Milwaukee Brewers	Caleb Smith	LHP	New York Yankees	Traded to the Chicago Cubs, and returned to the Yankees
8	Los Angeles Angels	Justin Haley	RHP	Boston Red Sox	Traded to the San Diego Padres, and then to the Minnesota Twins, returned to Boston July 2017
9	Chicago White Sox	Dylan Covey	RHP	Oakland Athletics	Made the White Sox' Opening Day roster
10	Pittsburgh Pirates	Tyler Webb	LHP	New York Yankees	Returned to the Yankees
11	Detroit Tigers	Daniel Stumpf	LHP	Kansas City Royals	Elected free agency after waived by Detroit, and resigned with Detroit
12	Baltimore Orioles	Aneury Tavárez	OF	Boston Red Sox	Returned to the Red Sox
13	Toronto Blue Jays	Glenn Sparkman	RHP	Kansas City Royals	Started the season on the disabled list and returned to the Royals
14	Boston Red Sox	Josh Rutledge	SS	Colorado Rockies	Started the season on the disabled list
15	Cleveland Indians	Hoby Milner	LHP	Philadelphia Phillies	Returned to the Phillies
16	Texas Rangers	Mike Hauschild	RHP	Houston Astros	Made the Rangers' Opening Day roster, returned to Astros
17	Cincinnati Reds	Stuart Turner	C	Minnesota Twins	Made the Reds' Opening Day roster
18	Baltimore Orioles	Anthony Santander	OF	Cleveland Indians	Started the season on the disabled list

Minor league phase – notable players

- Ty Hensley, RHP, Tampa Bay Rays from the New York Yankees
- Anthony Bemboom, C, Colorado Rockies from the Los Angeles Angels
- Cal Towey, OF, Miami Marlins from the Los Angeles Angels
- Austin Wilson, OF, St. Louis Cardinals from the Seattle Mariners
- Nick Maronde, LHP, Miami Marlins from the Cleveland Indians
- Colten Brewer, RHP, New York Yankees from the Pittsburgh Pirates
- Brian Moran, LHP, Baltimore Orioles from the Atlanta Braves
- Alex Yarbrough, 2B, Miami Marlins from the Los Angeles Angels

=== 2015 ===
Major League phase

Pick	By	Player	Pos	From	Notes
1	Philadelphia Phillies	Tyler Goeddel	OF	Tampa Bay Rays	Remained with the Phillies for the entire season
2	Cincinnati Reds	Jake Cave	OF	New York Yankees	Returned to the New York Yankees
3	Atlanta Braves	Evan Rutckyj	LHP	New York Yankees	Returned to the New York Yankees
4	Colorado Rockies	Luis Perdomo	RHP	St. Louis Cardinals	Traded to the San Diego Padres, remained with the Padres for the entire season
5	Milwaukee Brewers	Colin Walsh	2B	Oakland Athletics	Returned to the Oakland Athletics
6	Oakland Athletics	Jabari Blash	OF	Seattle Mariners	Traded to the San Diego Padres
7	San Diego Padres	Josh Martin	RHP	Cleveland Indians	Returned to the Cleveland Indians
8	Baltimore Orioles	Joey Rickard	OF	Tampa Bay Rays	Remained with the Orioles for the entire season
9	Los Angeles Angels	Deolis Guerra	RHP	Pittsburgh Pirates	Remained with the Angels for the entire season
10	Toronto Blue Jays	Joe Biagini	RHP	San Francisco Giants	Remained with the Blue Jays for the entire season
11	St. Louis Cardinals	Matt Bowman	RHP	New York Mets	Remained with the Cardinals for the entire season
12	Philadelphia Phillies	Daniel Stumpf	LHP	Kansas City Royals	Returned to the Kansas City Royals
13	Cincinnati Reds	Chris O'Grady	LHP	Los Angeles Angels	Returned to the Los Angeles Angels
14	Milwaukee Brewers	Zack Jones	RHP	Minnesota Twins	Returned to the Minnesota Twins
15	San Diego Padres	Blake Smith	RHP	Chicago White Sox	Returned to the White Sox
16	Los Angeles Angels	Ji-man Choi	1B	Baltimore Orioles	

Minor league phases – notable players

- Ariel Hernandez, RHP, Cincinnati Reds from the Arizona Diamondbacks
- Enderson Franco, RHP, Atlanta Braves from the Miami Marlins
- Brian Moran, LHP Cleveland Indians from the Seattle Mariners
- Zack Cox, 3B, Washington Nationals from the Miami Marlins
- Yefry Ramírez, RHP, New York Yankees from the Arizona Diamondbacks
- David Freitas, C, Chicago Cubs from the Baltimore Orioles
- John Brebbia, RHP, St. Louis Cardinals from the Arizona Diamondbacks
- D. J. Johnson, RHP, Los Angeles Angels from the Miami Marlins

=== 2014 ===
Major League phase

Pick	By	Player	Pos	From	Notes
1	Arizona Diamondbacks	Oscar Hernández	C	Tampa Bay Rays	
2	Colorado Rockies	Mark Canha	IF	Miami Marlins	Traded to the Oakland Athletics
3	Texas Rangers	Delino DeShields Jr.	OF	Houston Astros	
4	Houston Astros	Jason Garcia	RHP	Boston Red Sox	Traded to the Baltimore Orioles
5	Minnesota Twins	J. R. Graham	RHP	Atlanta Braves	
6	Boston Red Sox	Jandel Gustave	RHP	Houston Astros	Traded to the Kansas City Royals, claimed by the San Diego Padres, returned to the Astros
7	Chicago Cubs	Taylor Featherston	SS	Colorado Rockies	Traded to the Los Angeles Angels
8	Philadelphia Phillies	Odúbel Herrera	IF	Texas Rangers	
9	Miami Marlins	Andrew McKirahan	LHP	Chicago Cubs	Claimed by the Atlanta Braves
10	New York Mets	Sean Gilmartin	LHP	Minnesota Twins	
11	Atlanta Braves	Daniel Winkler	RHP	Colorado Rockies	Did not spend 90 days on active roster. Needed about 2 months on the active roster to remain with the Braves
12	Seattle Mariners	David Rollins	LHP	Houston Astros	
13	Baltimore Orioles	Logan Verrett	RHP	New York Mets	Claimed by the Texas Rangers, made the Rangers' Opening Day roster, returned to the Mets
14	Philadelphia Phillies	Andy Oliver	LHP	Pittsburgh Pirates	Outrighted to the minors by the Phillies, but opted for free agency

Minor league phase – notable players

- Tim Crabbe, RHP, Arizona Diamondbacks from the Cincinnati Reds
- Greg Peavey, RHP, Minnesota Twins from the New York Mets
- Sean Halton, OF, Baltimore Orioles from the Milwaukee Brewers
- Brett Jackson, OF, San Francisco Giants from the Arizona Diamondbacks
- Randy Fontanez, RHP, Los Angeles Dodgers from the New York Mets
- Kentrail Davis, OF, Los Angeles Angels from the Milwaukee Brewers

=== 2013 ===
Major League phase

Pick	By	Player	Pos	From	Notes
1	Houston Astros	Patrick Schuster	LHP	Arizona Diamondbacks	Sent to the San Diego Padres as the player to be named later for Anthony Bass, Returned to the Diamondbacks
2	Chicago White Sox	Adrián Nieto	C	Washington Nationals	
3	Philadelphia Phillies	Kevin Munson	RHP	Arizona Diamondbacks	Returned to the Diamondbacks
4	Colorado Rockies	Tommy Kahnle	RHP	New York Yankees	
5	Toronto Blue Jays	Brian Moran	LHP	Seattle Mariners	Traded to the Los Angeles Angels
6	New York Mets	Seth Rosin	RHP	Philadelphia Phillies	Traded to the Los Angeles Dodgers, Claimed off waivers by the Rangers, Returned to the Phillies
7	Milwaukee Brewers	Wei-Chung Wang	LHP	Pittsburgh Pirates	
8	Arizona Diamondbacks	Marcos Mateo	RHP	Chicago Cubs	Returned to the Cubs during spring training
9	Baltimore Orioles	Michael Almanzar	3B	Boston Red Sox	Returned to the Red Sox, later traded to Orioles

Minor league phase – notable players

- Justin Bour, 1B, Miami Marlins from the Chicago Cubs
- Evan Crawford, LHP, Chicago White Sox from the Toronto Blue Jays
- Kevin Mattison, OF, Milwaukee Brewers from the Miami Marlins
- Julio Borbón, OF, Baltimore Orioles from the Chicago Cubs
- Russell Wilson, 2B, Texas Rangers from the Colorado Rockies
- Enderson Franco, RHP, Tampa Bay Rays from the Houston Astros
- Tim Atherton, RHP, Oakland Athletics from the Minnesota Twins
- Omar Narváez, C, Chicago White Sox from the Tampa Bay Rays
- Richard Bleier, LHP, Toronto Blue Jays from the Texas Rangers
- A. J. Morris, RHP, Pittsburgh Pirates from the Chicago Cubs

=== 2012 ===
Major League phase

Pick	By	Player	Pos	From	Notes
1	Houston Astros	Josh Fields	RHP	Boston Red Sox	
2	Chicago Cubs	Héctor Rondón	RHP	Cleveland Indians	
3	Colorado Rockies	Danny Rosenbaum	LHP	Washington Nationals	Returned to the Nationals
4	Minnesota Twins	Ryan Pressly	RHP	Boston Red Sox	
5	Cleveland Indians	Chris McGuiness	1B	Texas Rangers	Returned to the Rangers
6	Miami Marlins	Alfredo Silverio	OF	Los Angeles Dodgers	
7	Boston Red Sox	Jeff Kobernus	2B	Washington Nationals	Traded to Detroit Tigers, returned to the Nationals
8	New York Mets	Kyle Lobstein	LHP	Tampa Bay Rays	Traded to Detroit Tigers, acquired from the Rays and outrighted to the minor leagues
9	Arizona Diamondbacks	Starling Peralta	RHP	Chicago Cubs	Returned to the Cubs
10	Philadelphia Phillies	Ender Inciarte	OF	Arizona Diamondbacks	Returned to the Diamondbacks
11	Chicago White Sox	Ángel Sánchez	IF	Los Angeles Angels	
12	Baltimore Orioles	T. J. McFarland	LHP	Cleveland Indians	
13	Texas Rangers	Coty Woods	RHP	Colorado Rockies	Returned to the Rockies
14	Houston Astros	Nate Freiman	1B	San Diego Padres	Claimed on waivers by the Oakland Athletics
15	Miami Marlins	Braulio Lara	LHP	Tampa Bay Rays	Returned to Tampa Bay

Minor league phases – notable players

- Eric Farris, 2B, Seattle Mariners from the Milwaukee Brewers
- Diego Goris, 3B, San Diego Padres from the Kansas City Royals
- Robbie Widlansky, 1B, Los Angeles Angels from the Baltimore Orioles
- Tommy Mendonca, 3B, Oakland Athletics from the Texas Rangers
- Ryan Dennick, LHP, Cincinnati Reds from the Kansas City Royals
- Federico Castañeda, RHP, San Diego Padres from the Kansas City Royals
- Efraín Nieves, LHP, Toronto Blue Jays from the Detroit Tigers

=== 2011 ===
Major League phase

Pick	By	Player	Pos	From	Notes
1	Houston Astros	Rhiner Cruz	RHP	New York Mets	
2	Minnesota Twins	Terry Doyle	RHP	Chicago White Sox	Returned to Chicago, later signed with the Fukuoka SoftBank Hawks in Japan
3	Seattle Mariners	Lucas Luetge	LHP	Milwaukee Brewers	
4	Baltimore Orioles	Ryan Flaherty	IF	Chicago Cubs	
5	Kansas City Royals	César Cabral	LHP	Boston Red Sox	Traded to the New York Yankees for cash.
6	Chicago Cubs	Lendy Castillo	RHP	Philadelphia Phillies	
7	Pittsburgh Pirates	Gustavo Núñez	SS	Detroit Tigers	
8	Atlanta Braves	Robert Fish	LHP	Los Angeles Angels	
9	St. Louis Cardinals	Erik Komatsu	OF	Washington Nationals	Claimed off waivers by the Minnesota Twins and later returned to Washington.
10	Boston Red Sox	Marwin González	SS	Chicago Cubs	Traded to the Houston Astros for Marco Duarte.
11	Arizona Diamondbacks	Brett Lorin	RHP	Pittsburgh Pirates	Rights permanently acquired by Arizona from Pittsburgh in exchange for Robby Rowland.
12	New York Yankees	Brad Meyers	RHP	Washington Nationals	

Minor league phase – notable players

- Aaron Poreda, LHP, Pittsburgh Pirates from the San Diego Padres
- Barret Browning, LHP, St. Louis Cardinals from the Los Angeles Angels
- Matt Buschmann, RHP, Washington Nationals from the San Diego Padres

=== 2010 ===
Major League phase

Pick	By	Player	Pos	From	Notes
1	Pittsburgh Pirates	Josh Rodriguez	SS	Cleveland Indians	Returned to Cleveland on April 29, 2011. Reacquired by Pittsburgh on June 21.
2	Seattle Mariners	José Flores	RHP	Cleveland Indians	Returned to Cleveland on March 25, 2011.
3	Arizona Diamondbacks	Joe Paterson	LHP	San Francisco Giants	
4	Baltimore Orioles	Adrian Rosario	RHP	Milwaukee Brewers	Returned to Milwaukee on March 24, 2011.
5	Kansas City Royals	Nate Adcock	RHP	Pittsburgh Pirates	
6	Washington Nationals	Elvin Ramírez	RHP	New York Mets	Returned to New York Mets on October 18, 2011.
7	Chicago Cubs	Mason Tobin	RHP	Los Angeles Angels	Traded to Texas on December 9, 2010.
8	Houston Astros	Aneury Rodríguez	RHP	Tampa Bay Rays	
9	Milwaukee Brewers	Pat Egan	RHP	Baltimore Orioles	Returned to Baltimore on March 24, 2011
10	New York Mets	Brad Emaus	2B	Toronto Blue Jays	Returned to Toronto on April 21, 2011, then traded to Colorado on April 22, 2011.
11	San Diego Padres	George Kontos	RHP	New York Yankees	Returned to New York Yankees on March 14, 2011.
12	Minnesota Twins	Scott Diamond	LHP	Atlanta Braves	Rights acquired by Minnesota from Atlanta in exchange for Billy Bullock.
13	New York Yankees	Robert Fish	LHP	Los Angeles Angels	Claimed off waivers by Kansas City on March 13, 2011. Returned to Los Angeles Angels on March 27.
14	Tampa Bay Rays	César Cabral	LHP	Boston Red Sox	Claimed off waivers by Toronto on March 12, 2011, and by Tampa Bay on March 14. Returned to Boston on March 28.
15	Philadelphia Phillies	Michael Martínez	IF	Washington Nationals	
16	Washington Nationals	Brian Broderick	RHP	St. Louis Cardinals	Returned to St. Louis on May 23, 2011.
17	Houston Astros	Lance Pendleton	RHP	New York Yankees	Returned to New York Yankees on March 27, 2011.
18	New York Mets	Pedro Beato	RHP	Baltimore Orioles	
19	New York Yankees	Daniel Turpen	RHP	Boston Red Sox	Returned to Boston on March 13, 2011.

Minor league phases – notable players

- Dashenko Ricardo, C, San Francisco Giants from the Baltimore Orioles
- Quintin Berry, OF, New York Mets from the San Diego Padres

=== 2009 ===
Major league phase

Pick	By	Player	Pos	From	Notes
1	Washington Nationals	Jamie Hoffmann	OF	Los Angeles Dodgers	Acquired by the New York Yankees as the player to be named later in the trade for Brian Bruney. Returned to Los Angeles on March 22, 2010.
2	Pittsburgh Pirates	John Raynor	OF	Florida Marlins	Returned to Marlins on May 4, 2010
3	Baltimore Orioles	Ben Snyder	LHP	San Francisco Giants	Acquired by the Texas Rangers as the player to be named later in the trade for Kevin Millwood. Texas traded Edwin Escobar to San Francisco to retain his rights and outrighted him to the minors
4	Kansas City Royals	Edgar Osuna	LHP	Atlanta Braves	Outrighted to the minor leagues after Atlanta declined to reclaim him
5	Cleveland Indians	Héctor Ambriz	RHP	Arizona Diamondbacks	
6	Arizona Diamondbacks	Zach Kroenke	LHP	New York Yankees	
7	New York Mets	Carlos Monasterios	RHP	Philadelphia Phillies	Sold to the Los Angeles Dodgers for cash on day of draft
8	Houston Astros	Jorge Jiménez	3B	Boston Red Sox	Acquired by the Florida Marlins as the player to be named later for Matt Lindstrom. Returned to Boston on March 21, 2010.
9	Oakland Athletics	Bobby Cassevah	RHP	Los Angeles Angels	Returned to Los Angeles on March 15, 2010
10	Toronto Blue Jays	Zech Zinicola	RHP	Washington Nationals	Returned to Washington on March 18, 2010.
11	Milwaukee Brewers	Chuck Lofgren	LHP	Cleveland Indians	Milwaukee traded Omar Aguilar to Cleveland to retain his rights. Lofgren was then outrighted to the minor leagues.
12	Chicago Cubs	Mike Parisi	RHP	St. Louis Cardinals	Outrighted to the minor leagues after St. Louis declined to reclaim him.
13	Tampa Bay Rays	Armando Zerpa	LHP	Boston Red Sox	Traded to Los Angeles Dodgers on December 10, 2009, returned to Boston on March 15, 2010
14	Seattle Mariners	Kanekoa Texeira	RHP	New York Yankees	Designated for assignment on May 31, 2010, claimed off waivers by the Kansas City Royals
15	San Francisco Giants	Steve Johnson	RHP	Baltimore Orioles	Returned to Baltimore March 16, 2010.
16	St. Louis Cardinals	Ben Jukich	LHP	Cincinnati Reds	Returned to Cincinnati on March 18, 2010.
17	Philadelphia Phillies	David Herndon	RHP	Los Angeles Angels	

Minor league phase – notable players

- Brian Horwitz, OF, Cleveland Indians from the San Francisco Giants

=== 2008 ===
Major league phase

Pick	By	Player	Pos	From	Notes
1	Washington Nationals	Terrell Young	RHP	Cincinnati Reds	
2	Seattle Mariners	Reegie Corona	IF	New York Yankees	Returned to the Yankees on April 2, 2009
3	San Diego Padres	Everth Cabrera	SS	Colorado Rockies	
4	Pittsburgh Pirates	Donnie Veal	LHP	Chicago Cubs	
5	Baltimore Orioles	Lou Palmisano	C	Milwaukee Brewers	Traded to the Houston Astros for cash considerations. Retained by Houston after Milwaukee declined to accept him back on March 21, 2009.
6	San Francisco Giants	Luis Perdomo	RHP	St. Louis Cardinals	Started the season with San Francisco, but later designated for assignment and claimed by the San Diego Padres on April 10, 2009
7	Cincinnati Reds	David Patton	RHP	Colorado Rockies	Traded to the Chicago Cubs for cash considerations.
8	Detroit Tigers	Kyle Bloom	LHP	Pittsburgh Pirates	Returned to the Pirates on March 29, 2009
9	Kansas City Royals	Jose Lugo	LHP	Minnesota Twins	Traded to the Seattle Mariners for cash considerations. Returned to Twins on April 1, 2009
10	Oakland Athletics	Benjamin Copeland	CF	San Francisco Giants	
11	Arizona Diamondbacks	James Skelton	C	Detroit Tigers	
12	Florida Marlins	Zach Kroenke	LHP	New York Yankees	Returned to Yankees March 16, 2009
13	Houston Astros	Gilbert De La Vara	LHP	Kansas City Royals	Returned to Royals on March 31, 2009
14	Minnesota Twins	Jason Jones	RHP	New York Yankees	The Twins traded Charles Nolte to New York for Jones' rights.
15	New York Mets	Darren O'Day	RHP	Los Angeles Angels	Claimed off waivers by the Texas Rangers April 22, 2009
16	Milwaukee Brewers	Eduardo Morlan	RHP	Tampa Bay Rays	Returned to Tampa Bay on March 19, 2009
17	Philadelphia Phillies	Bobby Mosebach	RHP	Los Angeles Angels	Returned to Anaheim on April 1, 2009
18	Boston Red Sox	Miguel González	RHP	Los Angeles Angels	Missed the entire season due to Tommy John surgery
19	Tampa Bay Rays	Derek Rodriguez	RHP	Chicago White Sox	Returned to Chicago White Sox on March 23, 2009
20	San Diego Padres	Iván Nova	RHP	New York Yankees	Returned to Yankees on March 29, 2009
21	New York Mets	Rocky Cherry	RHP	Baltimore Orioles	Released by Mets after Baltimore refused to take him back

Minor league phases – notable players

- Ricardo Nanita, OF, Washington Nationals from the Chicago White Sox
- Guilder Rodríguez, SS, Texas Rangers from the Milwaukee Brewers
- Dave Shinskie, RHP, Toronto Blue Jays from the Minnesota Twins

=== 2007 ===
Major league phase

Pick	By	Player	Pos	From	Notes
1	Tampa Bay Rays	Tim Lahey	RHP	Minnesota Twins	Traded to Chicago Cubs on December 6, 2007, claimed off waivers by Philadelphia Phillies on March 28, 2008, returned to Minnesota on April 12, 2008
2	Pittsburgh Pirates	Evan Meek	RHP	Tampa Bay Rays	Remained with the Pirates after Pittsburgh negotiated to retain his rights.
3	Baltimore Orioles	Randor Bierd	RHP	Detroit Tigers	
4	San Francisco Giants	José Capellán	LHP	Boston Red Sox	Claimed by the Cincinnati Reds off waivers on March 12, 2008, returned to Boston on March 28
5	Florida Marlins	Carlos Guevara	RHP	Cincinnati Reds	Traded to the San Diego Padres for cash considerations on December 6, 2007, rights acquired from the Cincinnati Reds and he was outrighted the Padres' minor-league system
6	Cincinnati Reds	Sergio Valenzuela	RHP	Atlanta Braves	Returned to Atlanta on March 10, 2008
7	Washington Nationals	Matthew Whitney	3B	Cleveland Indians	Returned to Cleveland on March 22, 2008
8	Houston Astros	Wesley Wright	LHP	Los Angeles Dodgers	
9	Oakland Athletics	Fernando Hernandez Jr.	RHP	Chicago White Sox	Returned to Chicago on April 16, 2008
10	St. Louis Cardinals	Brian Barton	OF	Cleveland Indians	
11	Toronto Blue Jays	Randy Wells	RHP	Chicago Cubs	Returned to Chicago on April 16, 2008
12	Seattle Mariners	R. A. Dickey	RHP	Minnesota Twins	Rights traded to Seattle in exchange for Jair Fernandez on March 29, 2008
13	New York Mets	Steven Register	RHP	Colorado Rockies	Returned to Colorado on March 27, 2008
14	San Diego Padres	Michael Gardner	RHP	New York Yankees	Returned to New York on March 18, 2008
15	Philadelphia Phillies	Travis Blackley	LHP	San Francisco Giants	Rights acquired by Philadelphia
16	Washington Nationals	Garrett Guzman	OF	Minnesota Twins	Rights traded to Washington on March 23, 2008, in exchange for a player to be named later or cash
17	San Diego Padres	Callix Crabbe	2B	Milwaukee Brewers	Returned to Milwaukee on May 16, 2008
18	Philadelphia Phillies	Lincoln Holdzkom	RHP	Boston Red Sox	Later made a free agent after Boston refused to take him back and eventually given a one-year deal by Boston.

Minor league phases – notable players

- Joshua Hill, RHP, Pittsburgh Pirates from the Minnesota Twins
- Levi Romero, RHP, Texas Rangers from the Houston Astros
- Víctor Gárate, LHP, Los Angeles Dodgers from the Houston Astros
- Juan Cedeño, LHP, Detroit Tigers from the Washington Nationals
- Dustin Majewski, OF, Texas Rangers from the Toronto Blue Jays
- Brett Campbell, RHP, Milwaukee Brewers from the Washington Nationals
- Clayton Hamilton, RHP, Texas Rangers from the Pittsburgh Pirates
- Scott Mitchinson, RHP, Oakland Athletics from the Philadelphia Phillies
- Adalberto Méndez, RHP, Florida Marlins from the Chicago Cubs
- Ben Fritz, RHP, Detroit Tigers from the Oakland Athletics

=== 2006 ===
Major league phase

Pick	By	Player	Pos.	From	Notes
1	Tampa Bay Devil Rays	Ryan Goleski	OF	Cleveland Indians	Traded to Oakland on December 7, 2006. Returned to Cleveland on March 28, 2007.
2	Kansas City Royals	Joakim Soria	RHP	San Diego Padres	
3	Chicago Cubs	Josh Hamilton	OF	Tampa Bay Devil Rays	Traded by the Cubs to the Cincinnati Reds for cash considerations.
4	Pittsburgh Pirates	Sean White	RHP	Atlanta Braves	Traded by the Pirates to the Seattle Mariners for cash considerations.
5	Baltimore Orioles	Alfredo Simón	RHP	Texas Rangers	Traded by the Orioles to the Philadelphia Phillies for Adam Donachie and cash considerations. He was returned to the Rangers on March 18, 2007.
6	Washington Nationals	Jesús Flores	C	New York Mets	
7	Milwaukee Brewers	Edward Campusano	LHP	Chicago Cubs	Traded by the Brewers to the Detroit Tigers for cash considerations, returned to the Cubs on October 10, 2007
8	Cincinnati Reds	Jared Burton	RHP	Oakland Athletics	
9	Houston Astros	Lincoln Holdzkom	RHP	Chicago Cubs	Returned to the Cubs on March 11, 2007
10	Philadelphia Phillies	Adam Donachie	C	Kansas City Royals	Traded by the Phillies to the Baltimore Orioles for Alfredo Simón
11	Boston Red Sox	Nick Debarr	RHP	Tampa Bay Devil Rays	Returned to the Devil Rays on March 12, 2007
12	Toronto Blue Jays	Jason Smith	IF	Chicago Cubs	
13	San Diego Padres	Kevin Cameron	RHP	Minnesota Twins	
14	Oakland Athletics	Jay Marshall	LHP	Chicago White Sox	
15	Minnesota Twins	Alejandro Machado	IF	Washington Nationals	
16	New York Yankees	Josh Phelps	IF	Baltimore Orioles	
17	Washington Nationals	Levale Speigner	RHP	Minnesota Twins	
18	Philadelphia Phillies	Jim Ed Warden	RHP	Cleveland Indians	Returned to the Indians on March 28, 2007
19	Philadelphia Phillies	Ryan Budde	C	Los Angeles Angels	Returned to the Angels on April 23, 2007

Notable players chosen in the minor league phases

- Salomón Manríquez, C, Colorado Rockies from the Washington Nationals
- Josh Labandeira, INF, Florida Marlins from the Washington Nationals
- Francisco Mateo, LHP, Cincinnati Reds from the Toronto Blue Jays
- Cristhian Martínez, RHP, Florida Marlins from the Detroit Tigers
- Brian Buscher, INF, Minnesota Twins from the San Francisco Giants

=== 2005 ===
Major league phase

Pick	By	Player	Pos.	From	Notes
1	Kansas City Royals	Fabio Castro	LHP	Chicago White Sox	Traded to the Texas Rangers for Esteban Germán
2	Colorado Rockies	Luis Enrique Gonzales	LHP	Los Angeles Dodgers	
3	Tampa Bay Devil Rays	Steve Andrade	RHP	Toronto Blue Jays	Traded to San Diego on December 7, 2005. Claimed off waivers by Kansas City on March 28, 2006. Released by Kansas City on June 9.
4	Pittsburgh Pirates	Víctor Santos	RHP	Kansas City Royals	Traded to the Philadelphia Phillies for cash considerations
5	Detroit Tigers	Chris Booker	RHP	Washington Nationals	
6	San Diego Padres	Seth Etherton	RHP	Kansas City Royals	
7	New York Mets	Mitchell Wylie	RHP	San Francisco Giants	
8	Florida Marlins	Dan Uggla	2B	Arizona Diamondbacks	Played in the 2006 MLB All-Star Game
9	Minnesota Twins	Jason Pridie	OF	Tampa Bay Devil Rays	Returned to Tampa Bay before start of season
10	Boston Red Sox	James Vermilyea	RHP	Toronto Blue Jays	Returned to Toronto on March 14, 2006
11	St. Louis Cardinals	Juan Mateo	RHP	Chicago Cubs	
12	Florida Marlins	Michael Megrew	LHP	Los Angeles Dodgers	

Notable players chosen in the minor league phases

- Brandon Weeden, RHP, Kansas City Royals from the Los Angeles Dodgers
- Jason Bourgeois, IF, Seattle Mariners from the Atlanta Braves
- Eddie Bonine, Detroit Tigers from the San Diego Padres
- Eugenio Vélez, IF, San Francisco Giants from the Toronto Blue Jays
- Jayce Tingler, OF, Texas Rangers from the Toronto Blue Jays
- Ben Diggins, RHP, Houston Astros from the Milwaukee Brewers
- Tim Hummel, IF, Chicago White Sox from the St. Louis Cardinals
- Alexi Ogando, OF, Texas Rangers from the Oakland Athletics
- Cole Armstrong, C, Chicago White Sox from the Atlanta Braves
- Dewon Day, LHP, Chicago White Sox from the Toronto Blue Jays

=== 2004 ===
Major league phase

Pick	By	Player	Pos.	From	Notes
1	Arizona Diamondbacks	Angel Garcia	RHP	Minnesota Twins	Traded to Tampa Bay, returned to Minnesota on March 30, 2005.
2	Kansas City Royals	Andrew Sisco	LHP	Chicago Cubs	
3	Washington Nationals	Tyrell Godwin	OF	Toronto Blue Jays	
4	Milwaukee Brewers	Marcos Carvajal	RHP	Los Angeles Dodgers	Sold by the Brewers to the Colorado Rockies
5	Colorado Rockies	Matt Merricks	LHP	Los Angeles Dodgers	
6	Baltimore Orioles	Luke Hagerty	LHP	Chicago Cubs	Traded by the Orioles to the Florida Marlins
7	Philadelphia Phillies	Shane Victorino	OF	Los Angeles Dodgers	
8	Oakland Athletics	Tyler Johnson	LHP	St. Louis Cardinals	
9	Minnesota Twins	Ryan Rowland-Smith	LHP	Seattle Mariners	
10	Los Angeles Dodgers	D. J. Houlton	RHP	Houston Astros	
11	Boston Red Sox	Adam Stern	OF	Atlanta Braves	
12	Washington Nationals	Tony Blanco	IF	Cincinnati Reds	

Notable players chosen in the minor league phases

- Chris Demaria, RHP, Kansas City Royals from the Pittsburgh Pirates
- Lee Gronkiewicz, RHP, Toronto Blue Jays, from the Cleveland Indians
- Keith Ramsey, LHP, Colorado Rockies, from the Cleveland Indians
- Jean Machi, RHP, Tampa Bay Devil Rays, from the Philadelphia Phillies
- Henry Owens, RHP, New York Mets, from the Pittsburgh Pirates
- Rodrigo Rosario, RHP, Florida Marlins, from the Houston Astros
- Chris Gomez, INF, Philadelphia Phillies, from the Baltimore Orioles
- Arturo López, LHP, San Diego Padres, from the Los Angeles Dodgers
- Víctor Moreno, RHP, Oakland Athletics, from the Minnesota Twins
- Jan Granado, LHP, Minnesota Twins, from the Cincinnati Reds
- Aaron Herr, INF, Seattle Mariners, from the Atlanta Braves
- Edgar González, INF, Washington Nationals, from the Texas Rangers
- Juan Cerros, RHP, Milwaukee Brewers, from the Cincinnati Reds
- Armando Gabino, INF, Minnesota Twins, from the Cleveland Indians
- José García, RHP, St. Louis Cardinals, from the Texas Rangers
- Alejandro De Aza, OF, Florida Marlins, from the Los Angeles Dodgers
- Jim Kavourias, OF, Washington Nationals, from the Florida Marlins
- Jhonny Rivera, OF, Tampa Bay Devil Rays, from the Chicago White Sox
- Dan Kolb, RHP, Washington Nationals, from the Milwaukee Brewers

=== 2003 ===
Major league phase

Pick	By	Player	Pos.	From	Notes
1	Detroit Tigers	Chris Shelton	C/IF	Pittsburgh Pirates	
2	San Diego Padres	Rich Thompson	OF	Pittsburgh Pirates	Traded to the Kansas City Royals for No. 10 pick Jason Szuminski
3	Tampa Bay Devil Rays	Alec Zumwalt	RHP	Atlanta Braves	Returned to Atlanta on March 17, 2004
4	New York Mets	Frank Brooks	LHP	Pittsburgh Pirates	Traded to the Oakland Athletics
5	Milwaukee Brewers	Jeff Bennett	RHP	Pittsburgh Pirates	
6	Baltimore Orioles	José Bautista	IF	Pittsburgh Pirates	
7	Cincinnati Reds	David Mattox	RHP	New York Mets	
8	Texas Rangers	Chris Mabeus	RHP	Oakland Athletics	
9	Colorado Rockies	Matt White	LHP	Cleveland Indians	
10	Kansas City Royals	Jason Szuminski	RHP	Chicago Cubs	Traded to the San Diego Padres for No. 2 pick Rich Thompson
11	Montreal Expos	Andy Fox	IF	Texas Rangers	
12	Toronto Blue Jays	Talley Haines	RHP	Tampa Bay Devil Rays	
13	Chicago White Sox	Jason Grilli	RHP	Florida Marlins	
14	St. Louis Cardinals	Héctor Luna	IF	Cleveland Indians	
15	Boston Red Sox	Lenny DiNardo	LHP	New York Mets	
16	Houston Astros	Willy Taveras	OF	Cleveland Indians	
17	Detroit Tigers	Mike Bumatay	LHP	Colorado Rockies	
18	Colorado Rockies	Luis González	IF/OF	Cleveland Indians	
19	Boston Red Sox	Colter Bean	RHP	New York Yankees	
20	Detroit Tigers	Lino Urdaneta	RHP	Cleveland Indians	

Notable players chosen in the minor league phases

- Eric Valent, OF, New York Mets, from the Cincinnati Reds
- Willie Collazo, LHP, Anaheim Angels, from the Atlanta Braves
- Leslie Nacar, RHP, Kansas City Royals, from the San Francisco Giants
- Ender Chávez, OF, Montreal Expos, from the New York Mets
- Luis Jimenez, INF, Los Angeles Dodgers, from the Baltimore Orioles
- John Foster, LHP, Chicago Cubs, from the Milwaukee Brewers
- Tim Corcoran, RHP, Tampa Bay Devil Rays, from the Baltimore Orioles
- Pete Zoccolillo, OF, Texas Rangers, from the Milwaukee Brewers
- Danny Sandoval, INF, Colorado Rockies, from the Philadelphia Phillies
- Alex Pelaez, INF, Anaheim Angels, from the San Diego Padres
- Francisco Campos, RHP, Chicago White Sox, from the Milwaukee Brewers
- Sergio Contreras, OF, Tampa Bay Devil Rays, from the Anaheim Angels

=== 2002 ===
Major League phase

Pick	By	Player	Pos.	From	Notes
1	Milwaukee Brewers	Enrique Cruz	IF	New York Mets	
2	Tampa Bay Devil Rays	Héctor Luna	IF	Cleveland Indians	Returned to Cleveland on March 29, 2003
3	San Diego Padres	Buddy Hernandez	RHP	Atlanta Braves	
4	Detroit Tigers	Wil Ledezma	LHP	Boston Red Sox	
5	Chicago Cubs	Derek Thompson	LHP	Cleveland Indians	
6	Kansas City Royals	D. J. Carrasco	RHP	Pittsburgh Pirates	
7	Pittsburgh Pirates	Matt Roney	RHP	Colorado Rockies	
8	Colorado Rockies	Victor Hall	OF	Arizona Diamondbacks	
9	Texas Rangers	Marshall McDougall	IF	Cleveland Indians	
10	Cleveland Indians	Travis Chapman	IF	Philadelphia Phillies	
11	Cincinnati Reds	Luke Prokopec	RHP	Los Angeles Dodgers	
12	Toronto Blue Jays	Aquilino López	RHP	Seattle Mariners	
13	Boston Red Sox	Javier López	LHP	Arizona Diamondbacks	
14	Montreal Expos	Luis Ayala	RHP	Arizona Diamondbacks	
15	Minnesota Twins	José Morban	IF	Texas Rangers	
16	Oakland Athletics	Mike Neu	RHP	Cincinnati Reds	
17	Atlanta Braves	Chris Spurling	RHP	Pittsburgh Pirates	
18	Milwaukee Brewers	Matt Ford	RHP	Toronto Blue Jays	
19	San Diego Padres	Shane Victorino	OF	Los Angeles Dodgers	
20	Kansas City Royals	Ronny Paulino	C	Pittsburgh Pirates	
21	Texas Rangers	John Koronka	RHP	Cincinnati Reds	
22	Cincinnati Reds	Blake Williams	RHP	St. Louis Cardinals	
23	Toronto Blue Jays	Gary Majewski	RHP	Chicago White Sox	
24	Boston Red Sox	Matt White	LHP	Cleveland Indians	
25	Oakland Athletics	Rontrez Johnson	OF	Texas Rangers	
26	Cincinnati Reds	Jerome Gamble	RHP	Boston Red Sox	
27	Toronto Blue Jays	Jason Dubois	OF	Chicago Cubs	
28	Boston Red Sox	Adrian Brown	OF	Pittsburgh Pirates	

Notable minor league selections

- David Manning, RHP, Milwaukee Brewers from the Minnesota Twins
- Rico Washington, C, San Diego Padres from the Pittsburgh Pirates
- Juan Cerros, RHP Cincinnati Reds from the New York Mets
- Franklyn Gracesqui, LHP, Miami Marlins from the Toronto Blue Jays
- Mike Cervenak, 3B, San Francisco Giants from the New York Yankees
- Andy Cavazos, RHP, St. Louis Cardinals from the Texas Rangers
- Junior Herndon, RHP, Boston Red Sox from the San Diego Padres
- Nate Bland, LHP, Houston Astros from the New York Mets

=== 2001 ===
Major league phase

Pick	By	Player	Pos.	From	Notes
1	Tampa Bay Devil Rays	Kevin McGlinchy	RHP	Atlanta Braves	
2	Pittsburgh Pirates	Luis Ugueto	IF	Florida Marlins	Later traded by the Pirates to the Seattle Mariners for cash considerations.
3	Kansas City Royals	Miguel Asencio	RHP	Philadelphia Phillies	
4	Montreal Expos	Joe Valentine	RHP	Chicago White Sox	Later traded by the Expos to the Detroit Tigers for cash considerations.
5	Detroit Tigers	Jeff Farnsworth	RHP	Seattle Mariners	
6	Milwaukee Brewers	Jorge Sosa	RHP	Seattle Mariners	Claimed off waivers from Milwaukee by Tampa Bay on March 18, 2002.
7	Anaheim Angels	Steve Kent	LHP	Seattle Mariners	Sent to Tampa Bay for cash considerations on December 17, 2001.
8	Toronto Blue Jays	Corey Thurman	RHP	Kansas City Royals	
9	San Diego Padres	Ryan Baerlocher	RHP	Kansas City Royals	
10	Oakland Athletics	Jason Grabowski	IF	Seattle Mariners	
11	San Francisco Giants	Félix Escalona	IF	Houston Astros	Claimed off waivers from San Francisco by Tampa Bay on March 27, 2002
12	Milwaukee Brewers	Ryan Christenson	OF	Arizona Diamondbacks	

Notable players chosen in the minor league phases

- Jeff Pickler, 2B, Texas Rangers from the Milwaukee Brewers
- Graham Koonce, 1B, Oakland Athletics from the San Diego Padres
- Ntema Ndungidi, OF, Seattle Mariners from the Baltimore Orioles
- Joe Dillon, 1B, Minnesota Twins from the Kansas City Royals

=== 2000 ===
Major League Phase

Pick	By	Player	Pos.	From
1	Chicago Cubs	Scott Chiasson	RHP	Oakland Athletics
2	Minnesota Twins	Brandon Knight	RHP	New York Yankees
3	Montreal Expos	Ted Rose	RHP	Cincinnati Reds
4	Baltimore Orioles	Jay Gibbons	IF	Toronto Blue Jays
5	Kansas City Royals	Endy Chávez	OF	New York Mets
6	Detroit Tigers	Jermaine Clark	IF	Seattle Mariners
7	San Diego Padres	Donaldo Méndez	IF	Houston Astros
8	Anaheim Angels	Rendy Espina	LHP	Toronto Blue Jays
9	Los Angeles Dodgers	José Antonio Núñez	LHP	New York Mets
10	New York Mets	Julio Santana	RHP	San Francisco Giants

=== 1999 ===
Major League Phase

Pick	By	Player	Pos.	From	Notes
1	Minnesota Twins	Jared Camp	RHP	Cleveland Indians	Later traded by the Twins to the Florida Marlins for Johan Santana.
2	Florida Marlins	Johan Santana	LHP	Houston Astros	Later traded by the Marlins to the Minnesota Twins for Jared Camp.
3	Kansas City Royals	Damian Rolls	IF	Los Angeles Dodgers	Immediately sent to Tampa Bay as part of a conditional deal.
4	Tampa Bay Devil Rays	Chad Ogea	RHP	Detroit Tigers	
5	Montreal Expos	Marty McLeary	RHP	Boston Red Sox	
6	Detroit Tigers	Mark Johnson	RHP	New York Yankees	
7	Anaheim Angels	Derrick Turnbow	RHP	Philadelphia Phillies	
8	San Diego Padres	Kory DeHaan	OF	Pittsburgh Pirates	
9	Milwaukee Brewers	Matt Williams	LHP	New York Yankees	Returned to New York on May 3, 2000.
10	Seattle Mariners	Chad Alexander	OF	Houston Astros	
11	Toronto Blue Jays	DeWayne Wise	OF	Cincinnati Reds	
12	Oakland Athletics	Bo Porter	OF	Chicago Cubs	
13	Pittsburgh Pirates	Brian Smith	RHP	Toronto Blue Jays	
14	San Francisco Giants	Dave Maurer	LHP	San Diego Padres	
15	Cincinnati Reds	Adrian Burnside	LHP	Los Angeles Dodgers	
16	New York Mets	Jim Mann	RHP	Toronto Blue Jays	
17	Tampa Bay Devil Rays	Chris Reitsma	RHP	Boston Red Sox	Returned to Boston on March 28, 2000.

=== 1998 ===
Major League Phase

Pick	By	Player	Pos.	From
1	Florida Marlins	Alberto Blanco	LHP	Houston Astros
2	Tampa Bay Devil Rays	David Lamb	IF	Baltimore Orioles
3	Detroit Tigers	Eric Ludwick	RHP	Florida Marlins
4	Montreal Expos	Ricky Williams	OF	Philadelphia Phillies
5	Minnesota Twins	Josue Espada	IF	Oakland Athletics
6	Pittsburgh Pirates	Scott Sauerbeck	LHP	New York Mets
7	Oakland Athletics	Eric Stuckenschneider	OF	Los Angeles Dodgers
8	Philadelphia Phillies	David Miller	OF	Cleveland Indians
9	Chicago White Sox	Jay Walker Chapman	RHP	Minnesota Twins
10	St. Louis Cardinals	Alberto Castillo	C	Philadelphia Phillies
11	Boston Red Sox	Joel Adamson	LHP	Oakland Athletics
12	Houston Astros	Glen Barker	OF	Detroit Tigers
13	Chicago White Sox	Tyrone Pendergrass	OF	Atlanta Braves

=== 1997 ===
Major League Phase

Pick	By	Player	Pos.	From	Notes
1	Seattle Mariners	Jeff Huson	IF	Colorado Rockies	Released by Seattle July 8, 1998
2	Philadelphia Phillies	Héctor Mercado	LHP	Florida Marlins	Later traded by Philadelphia to the New York Mets for Mike Welch
3	Texas Rangers	Scott Podsednik	OF	Florida Marlins	
4	Atlanta Braves	Brian Edmondson	RHP	New York Mets	
5	Arizona Diamondbacks	Stephen Randolph	LHP	New York Yankees	
6	Los Angeles Dodgers	Frank Lankford	RHP	New York Yankees	Returned by the Dodgers to the Yankees May 15, 1998
7	Detroit Tigers	Sean Runyan	LHP	San Diego Padres	
8	Cincinnati Reds	Keith Glauber	RHP	St. Louis Cardinals	
9	Toronto Blue Jays	Luis Saturria	OF	St. Louis Cardinals	Returned by the Blue Jays to the Cardinals March 20, 1998
10	New York Yankees	Matt Williams	LHP	Tampa Bay Devil Rays	
11	Chicago White Sox	Joe Davenport	RHP	Toronto Blue Jays	
