= Griff McGarry =

American baseball player (born 1999)

Los Angeles Dodgers
- Pitcher
- Born: June 8, 1999 (age 27); San Francisco, California, U.S.
- Bats: Right Throws: Right

Griffin Thomas McGarry (born June 8, 1999) is an American professional baseball pitcher in the Los Angeles Dodgers organization.

== Early life and education ==
McGarry grew up in Portola Valley, California and attended the Menlo School in Atherton, California.

McGarry attended the University of Virginia, where he played college baseball for the Virginia Cavaliers. He posted an 8.15 earned run average (ERA) in 11 appearances as a freshman. Following the season, he played collegiate summer baseball with the Keene Swamp Bats of the New England Collegiate Baseball League. McGarry was named the Cavaliers' opening day starter going into his sophomore season and went 3–5 with a 4.56 ERA. After the 2019 season he played for the Hyannis Harbor Hawks in the Cape Cod Baseball League. As a junior, McGarry went 3–0 with a 1.35 ERA and 31 strikeouts in 20 innings pitched before the season was cut short due to the coronavirus pandemic. As a senior, he struggled with his control at the start of the season and lost his spot in Virginia's starting rotation. He regained form in the second half of the season after striking out eight batters in 3.1 innings against Old Dominion and finished the season with an 0–5 record with a 5.44 ERA, 69 strikeouts and 42 walks in 43 innings pitched.

== Professional career ==
=== Philadelphia Phillies ===
Coming out of high school, McGarry was selected in the 31st round by the Texas Rangers in the 2017 Major League Baseball draft, but opted not to sign with the team. As a senior at Virginia, McGarry was selected by the Philadelphia Phillies in the fifth round of the 2021 Major League Baseball draft and this time chose to turn pro.

McGarry began his professional career with the Low-A Clearwater Threshers. He was promoted to the High-A Jersey Shore BlueClaws and finished the season with 1–0 record with one save and a 2.96 ERA and 43 strikeouts in 24 1/3 innings pitched. After reaching Triple-A for the first time with the Lehigh Valley IronPigs the following year, entering the 2023 season, McGarry was ranked by MLB Pipeline as the Phillies' third-best prospect. However, McGarry struggled and spent much of the year back at the Class-AA level with the Reading Fightin' Phils. He pitched to a 6.00 ERA across three levels while issuing 50 walks in 60 innings pitched. Ahead of the 2024 season, the Phillies announced McGarry would move out of the starting rotation into a full-time relief role.

As a reliever, McGarry's command issues were amplified. He walked 10.23 batters per nine innings and was ultimately transitioned back into a starting role in the Arizona Fall League after the 2024 season. Coming off a strong showing with the Glendale Desert Dogs, McGarry returned to Lehigh Valley's rotation in 2025 with a drastically reduced walk rate.

Despite McGarry's improved results, the Phillies opted not to add him to the 40-man roster ahead of the Rule 5 draft, leaving him exposed. On December 10, 2025, McGarry was selected by the Washington Nationals with the third overall pick in the Rule 5 draft. He was designated for assignment by the Nationals on March 22, 2026. On March 24, McGarry was returned to the Phillies organization. He made five appearances for Triple-A Lehigh Valley, but struggled to a 9.00 ERA with four strikeouts over four innings of work.

=== Los Angeles Dodgers ===
On April 14, 2026, McGarry was traded to the Los Angeles Dodgers in exchange for international bonus pool space as well as a player to be named later or cash. He was subsequently assigned to the Oklahoma City Comets, where he pitched 27 2/3 inning over 31 games with a 7.48 ERA.

== See also ==
- Rule 5 draft results
