= Gray Fenter =

American baseball player (born 1996)

- Pitcher
- Born: January 25, 1996 (age 30); West Memphis, Arkansas, U.S.
- Bats: Right Throws: Right

Gray Price Fenter (born January 25, 1996) is an American former professional baseball pitcher. The Baltimore Orioles selected Fenter in the seventh round of the 2015 MLB draft.

== Career ==
Fenter attended West Memphis High School in West Memphis, Arkansas, and played for the school's baseball team. As a senior, his fastball was recorded at 97 miles per hour (156 km/h). He committed to play college baseball for Mississippi State University.

=== Baltimore Orioles ===
The Baltimore Orioles selected Fenter in the seventh round, with the 223rd overall selection, of the 2015 MLB draft, and convinced him to begin his professional career rather than go to college, with a $1 million signing bonus.

Fenter made his professional debut with the Gulf Coast Orioles of the Rookie-level Gulf Coast League in 2015, and was 0–0 with a 1.66 ERA, but experienced elbow pain that required Tommy John surgery. He missed the entire 2016 season while recuperating. He returned to the Gulf Coast League in 2017, posting a 3.45 ERA in 11 games, also making one appearance for the Low-A Aberdeen IronBirds. In 2018, he pitched for the Single-A Delmarva Shorebirds as a relief pitcher, before he was sent to Aberdeen to pitch as a starting pitcher. Fenter had an 8–2 win–loss record and a 1.81 earned run average in 22 games (17 starts) for Delmarva in 2019. Fenter did not play in a game in 2020 due to the cancellation of the minor league season because of the COVID-19 pandemic.

On December 10, 2020, the Chicago Cubs selected Fenter from the Orioles in the 2020 Rule 5 draft. On March 12, 2021, Fenter was returned to the Orioles. He spent the year with the Double-A Bowie Baysox, pitching to a 6–4 record and 5.47 ERA with 86 strikeouts in 77 1/3 innings pitched across 21 games. He elected free agency following the season on November 7.

=== San Francisco Giants ===
On December 3, 2021, Fenter signed a minor league contract with the San Francisco Giants. Fenter was assigned to the Double-A Richmond Flying Squirrels to start the 2022 season. In 22 games for the team, he pitched to an 0-4 record and 5.13 ERA with 50 strikeouts across 40 1/3 innings of work. Fenter was released by the Giants organization on July 21, 2022.

=== Lancaster Barnstormers ===
On August 1, 2022, Fenter signed with the Lancaster Barnstormers of the Atlantic League of Professional Baseball. Fenter made 9 appearances (2 starts) for the Barnstormers down the stretch, logging a 2-1 record and 2.95 ERA with 32 strikeouts in 21 1/3 innings pitched. With Lancaster, Fenter won the 2022 Atlantic League championship.

=== New York Yankees ===
On February 1, 2023, Fenter signed a minor league contract with the New York Yankees organization. In 10 starts for the Double–A Somerset Patriots, he recorded a 5.01 ERA with 51 strikeouts across 41 1/3 innings pitched. Fenter elected free agency following the season on November 6.

== See also ==
- Rule 5 draft results
