= Ben Jukich =

American baseball player

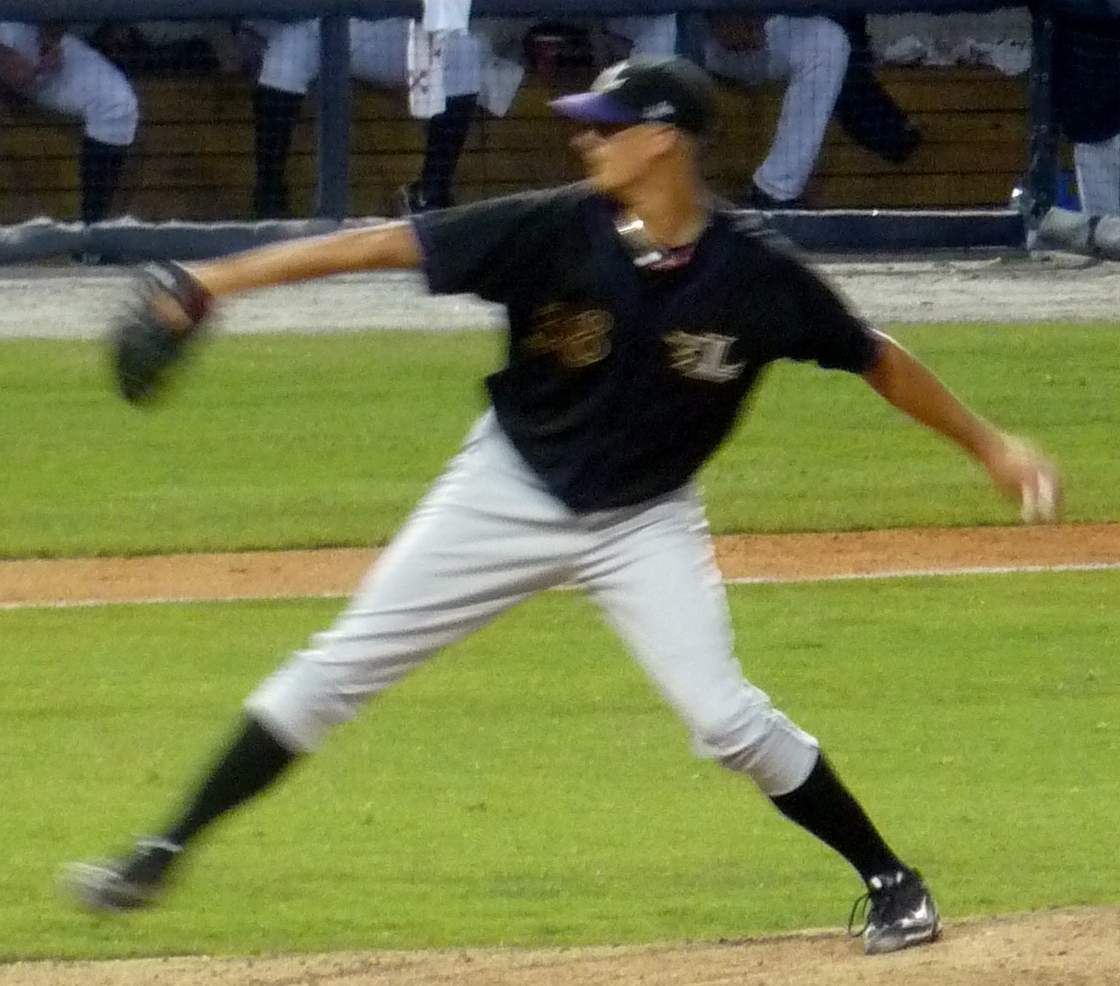
- Jukich with the Louisville Bats in 2009
- Relief pitcher
- Born: October 17, 1982 (age 44); Duluth, Minnesota
- Batted: Left Threw: Left

KBO debut
- April 5, 2011, for the LG Twins

Last KBO appearance
- August 13, 2013, for the LG Twins

KBO statistics
- Win–loss record: 25–22
- Earned run average: 4.00
- Strikeouts: 295
- Stats at Baseball Reference

Teams
- LG Twins (2011–2013)

Ben Jukich (born October 17, 1982) is an American former professional baseball pitcher. He played for the LG Twins of the Korea Baseball Organization (KBO).

== Early years ==
Jukich was born on October 17, 1982, in Duluth, Minnesota. He played college baseball at both McCook Community College and Dakota Wesleyan. He was the first Dakota Wesleyan graduate to be selected in the MLB draft.

== Professional career ==
Jukich was originally drafted by the Oakland Athletics in the 13th round of the 2006 MLB draft. During the 2006 season, Jukich went 3–2 with a 2.52 ERA in 16 games pitching primarily for the Vancouver Canadians. In 2007, Jukich was sent to the Cincinnati Reds to complete an earlier trade. He pitched in the Reds' organization until 2010 eventually reaching AAA. In 2010, he compiled a 7–4 record with an earned run average of 3.90. On December 12, 2009, Jukich was selected by the St. Louis Cardinals in the Rule 5 Draft, though he was eventually returned to the Louisville Bats. In the fall of 2010, while Jukich was pitching for Los Leones del Caracas in Venezuela, he was informed that the Reds had sold his contract to LG Twins of the Korea Professional Baseball league.

Jukich played three seasons with the Twins. Overall, he posted record of 25–22 with an ERA of 4.00.

== See also ==
- Rule 5 draft results
