= Héctor Luna =

Dominican baseball player (born 1980)

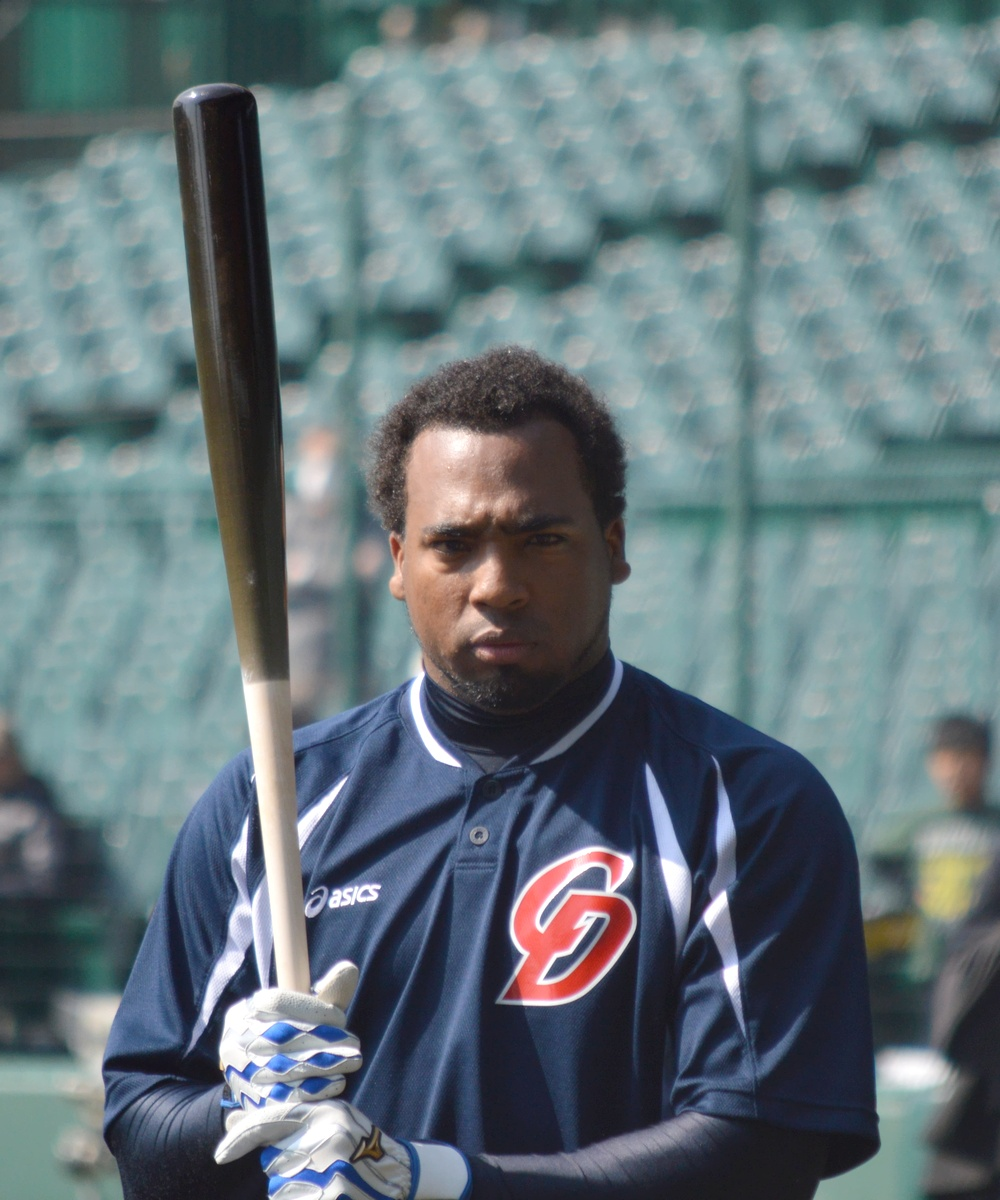
- Luna with the Chunichi Dragons
- Infielder
- Born: February 1, 1980 (age 46); Monte Cristi, Dominican Republic
- Batted: Right Threw: Right

Professional debut
- MLB: April 8, 2004, for the St. Louis Cardinals
- NPB: March 29, 2013, for the Chunichi Dragons

Last appearance
- MLB: August 17, 2012, for the Philadelphia Phillies
- NPB: 2016, for the Hiroshima Toyo Carp

MLB statistics
- Batting average: .262
- Home runs: 15
- Runs batted in: 96

NPB statistics
- Batting average: .309
- Home runs: 39
- Runs batted in: 218
- Stats at Baseball Reference

Teams
- St. Louis Cardinals (2004–2006); Cleveland Indians (2006); Toronto Blue Jays (2007–2008); Florida Marlins (2010); Philadelphia Phillies (2012); Chunichi Dragons (2013–2015); Hiroshima Toyo Carp (2016)

Career highlights and awards
- NPB: 1× Central League Best Nine Award (2014)

Héctor R. Luna (born February 1, 1980) is a Dominican former professional baseball infielder. He last played for the Hiroshima Carp in Nippon Professional Baseball. He is primarily an infielder, but has played every position at the major league level except pitcher and catcher.

== Career ==
=== Cleveland Indians ===
Luna was signed as an undrafted free agent by the Cleveland Indians in 1999 and played from 2000 to 2003 with the Indians farm system, reaching as high as AA with the Akron Aeros in 2003.

=== Tampa Bay Devil Rays ===
The Tampa Bay Devil Rays drafted Luna from the Indians in the 2002 Rule 5 Draft. He returned to the Indians in April 2003.

=== St. Louis Cardinals ===
Luna was drafted by the St. Louis Cardinals from the Indians in the Rule 5 Draft in December 2003. He made his major league debut with the Cardinals on April 8, 2004. He hit a home run in his first Major League at-bat, against Milwaukee Brewers pitcher Chris Capuano.

In the 2004 World Series, while playing against the Boston Red Sox, Luna appeared in one game. In the eighth inning of the Game 4, he pinch hit for second baseman Tony Womack and struck out.

=== Return to Indians ===
On July 30, 2006, Luna was traded by the Cardinals to the Cleveland Indians for second baseman Ronnie Belliard. He split second base duties with Joe Inglett for the remainder of the season.

After the 2006 season, the Indians acquired Josh Barfield from the San Diego Padres to be the team's everyday second baseman, leaving Luna to fight for a utility infield role with three other candidates during the team's 2007 spring training. He performed poorly during spring training, committing eight errors and batting just .012 in 28 spring games. The Indians kept Mike Rouse as their utility infielder and Luna began 2007 with the AAA Buffalo Bisons.

=== Toronto Blue Jays ===
On August 3, 2007, the Toronto Blue Jays claimed Luna off waivers, and he played in 22 games in 2007 and two in 2008 with Toronto.

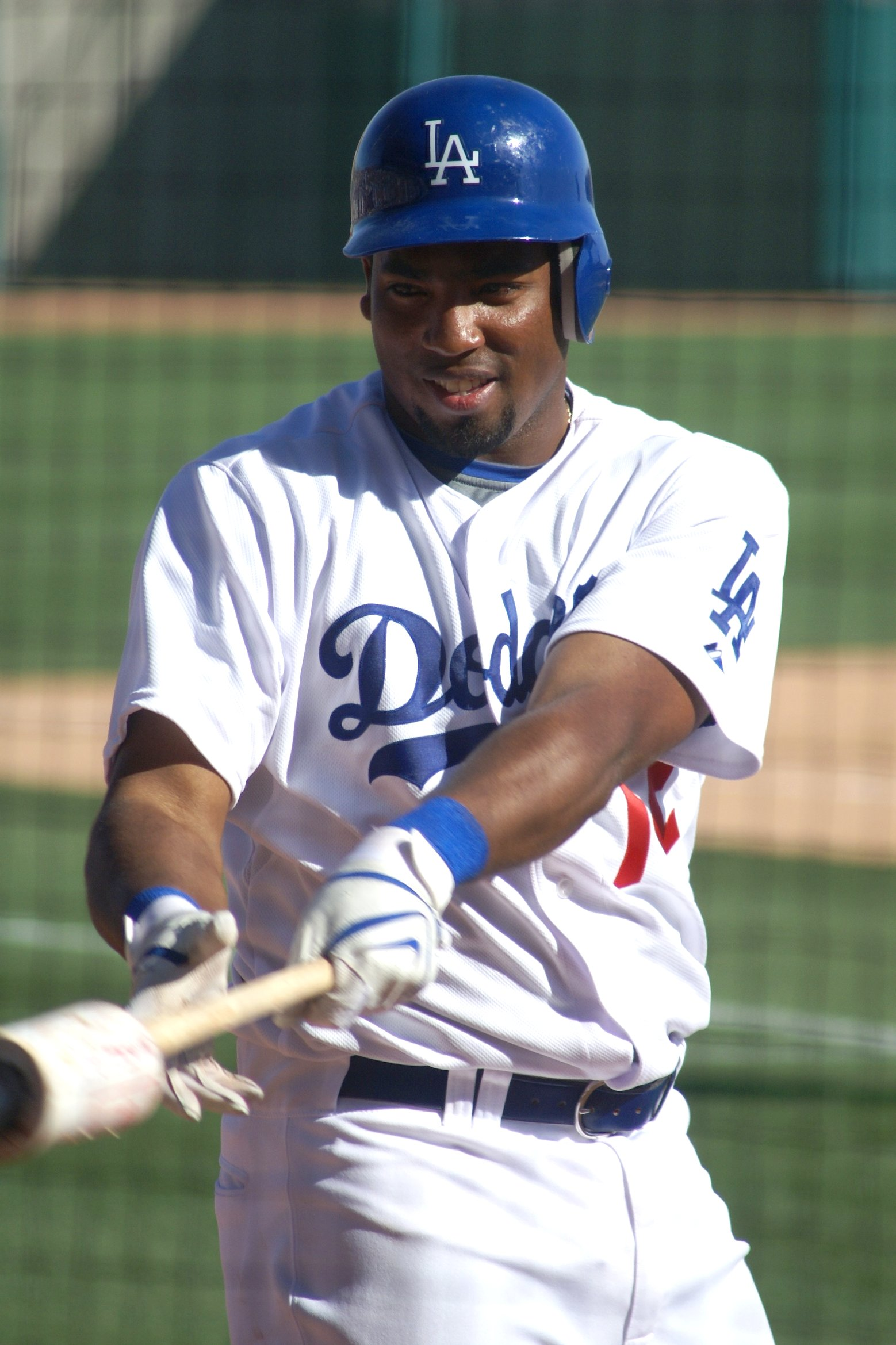
Luna with the Dodgers in 2009 spring training

=== Los Angeles Dodgers ===
Luna became a free agent after the 2008 season and signed a minor league contract with the Los Angeles Dodgers.

Luna was assigned to the AAA Albuquerque Isotopes for the 2009 season. He had a successful year for the Isotopes, hitting .351 with 17 home runs and 62 RBI in 92 games.

=== Florida Marlins ===
On December 4, 2009, Luna signed a minor league contract with the Florida Marlins. He spent the majority of the season in the Marlins system and appeared in 27 games for the Marlins late in the season, hitting .138 with two home runs and 4 RBI.

=== Boston Red Sox ===
On January 3, 2011, Luna signed a minor league contract with the Boston Red Sox.

=== Philadelphia Phillies ===
On December 21, 2011, Luna signed a minor league contract with the Philadelphia Phillies. After opening the 2012 season with the AAA Lehigh Valley IronPigs, his contract was purchased by the Phillies on May 11. Luna replaced the injured Laynce Nix on the Phillies' 25-man roster. He hit a grand slam in his first official at-bat as a Phillie five days later against the Chicago Cubs at Wrigley Field. He was released by the Phillies on August 30, 2012.

=== Pittsburgh Pirates ===
Luna signed with the Pirates on August 31, 2012. In November 2012, Luna became a free agent.

=== Chunichi Dragons ===
In November 2012, Luna signed with the Chunichi Dragons worth $450,000 with up to $200,000 in incentives. With the conclusion of the 2015 NPB season, his third year with the Chunichi Dragons, Luna had batted .316 with 34 home runs and 184 RBIs in 346 games played.

=== Hiroshima Carp ===
On December 18, 2015, as a free agent, Luna signed with the Hiroshima Carp on a one-year deal. In 2016, Luna played in 67 games for the Carp, batting .272 with five home runs and 34 RBI. At the end of the season, Luna was one of 3 foreign players cut by the Carp including Jason Pridie and Steve Delabar.

Through four seasons in NPB, Luna had a career batting average of .309.

== See also ==
- List of Major League Baseball players with a home run in their first major league at bat
- Rule 5 draft results
