= Clayton Hamilton (baseball) =

American baseball player

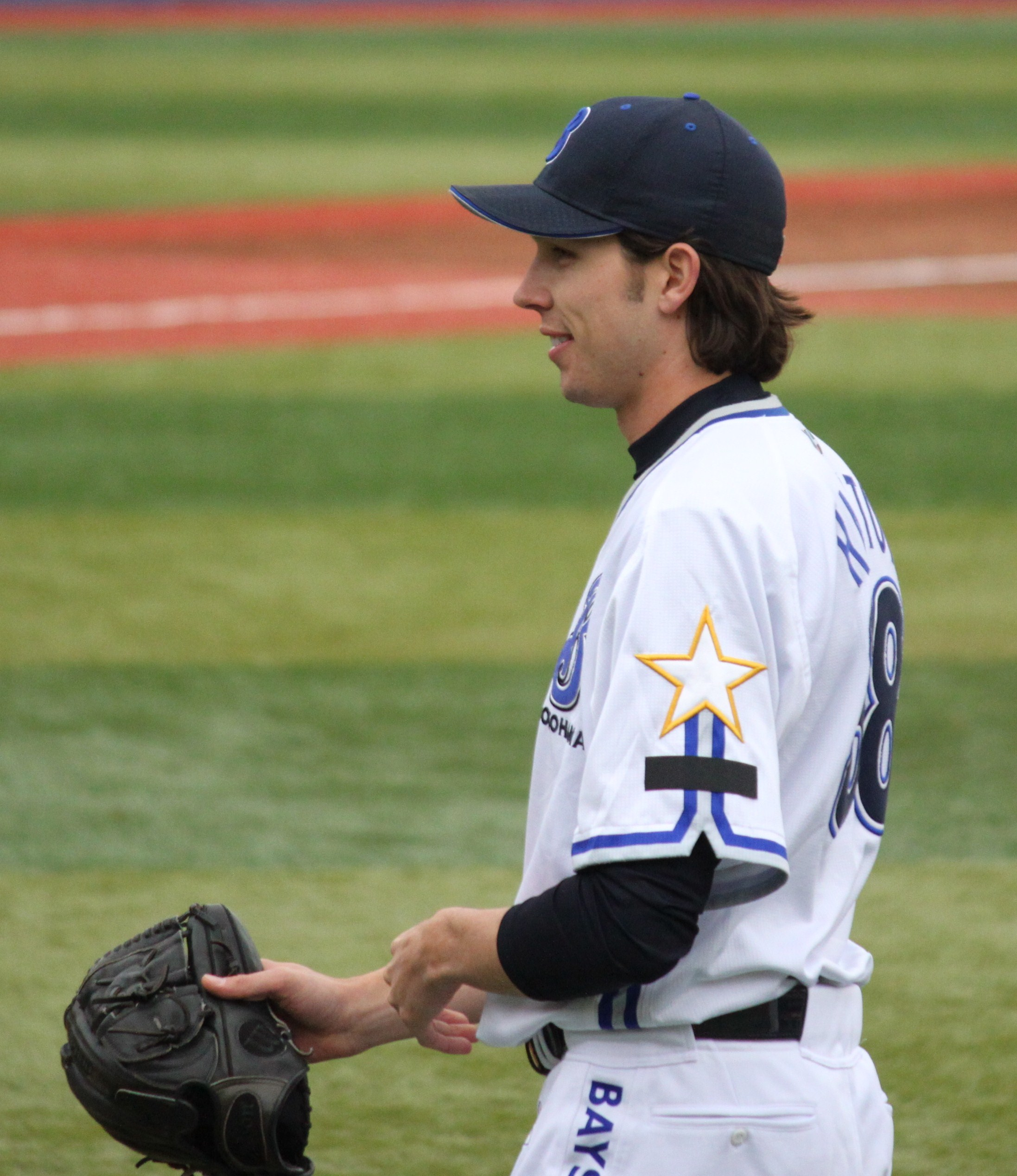
- Pitcher
- Born: June 15, 1982 (age 42); Beaver Falls, Pennsylvania
- Bats: Right Throws: Right

NPB statistics
- Win–loss record: 1–4
- Earned run average: 7.25
- Strikeouts: 25

Teams
- Yokohama DeNA BayStars (2011–2012)

Clayton Hamilton (born June 15, 1982) is an American retired professional baseball pitcher. He played for the Yokohama DeNA BayStars of Nippon Professional Baseball in 2011 and 2012.

== Biography ==
From Penn State University, he was selected by the San Diego Padres in the 17th Round (492nd overall) of the 2004 amateur entry draft. He was signed by scout Josh Boyd.

On December 8, 2005, he was sent by the San Diego Padres to the Pittsburgh Pirates as a player to be named later in a November 21, 2005 trade. On December 6, 2007, he was picked up in the Minor League phase of the Rule 5 Draft by the Texas Rangers. Hamilton split 2008 between the Bakersfield Blaze and Frisco RoughRiders. In 2009, he worked with Frisco and the Oklahoma City RedHawks.

In 2005, Hamilton won the Fort Wayne Wizards' "Pitcher/Prospect of the Year" award, and was selected for the Eastern Division's All-Star team.

== Nippon Professional Baseball ==
In October 2010, Hamilton traveled to Yokohama, Japan to try out with the Yokohama BayStars of the Nippon Professional Baseball league.

In November 2010, Hamilton signed a 1-year contract with the Baystars

Following the 2011 Tōhoku earthquake and tsunami, Hamilton was allowed to return to the United States while the NPB figured out the fate of the season. Clayton decided to return to Japan after discussions with his family.

== See also ==
- Rule 5 draft results
