= Mark Payton =

American baseball player (born 1991)

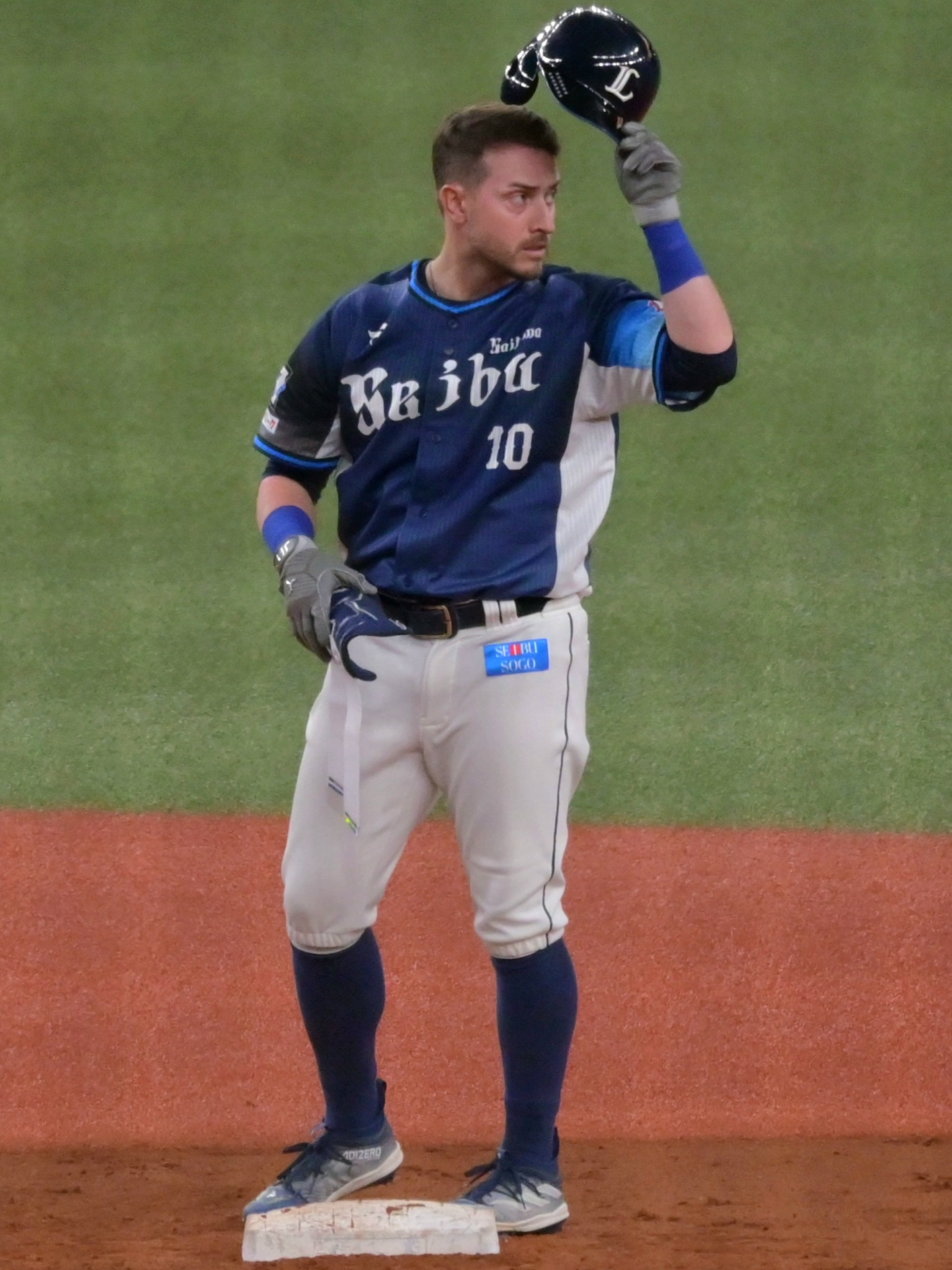
- Payton with the Saitama Seibu Lions in 2023

Free agent
- Outfielder
- Born: December 7, 1991 (age 34); Orland Park, Illinois, U.S.
- Bats: Left Throws: Left

Professional debut
- MLB: August 22, 2020, for the Cincinnati Reds
- NPB: March 31, 2023, for the Saitama Seibu Lions

MLB statistics (through 2022 season)
- Batting average: .164
- Home runs: 0
- Runs batted in: 1

NPB statistics (through 2023 season)
- Batting average: .215
- Home runs: 5
- Runs batted in: 22
- Stats at Baseball Reference

Teams
- Cincinnati Reds (2020–2021); Chicago White Sox (2022); Saitama Seibu Lions (2023)

Mark David Payton (born December 7, 1991) is an American professional baseball outfielder who is a free agent. He has previously played in Major League Baseball (MLB) for the Cincinnati Reds and Chicago White Sox, and in Nippon Professional Baseball (NPB) for the Saitama Seibu Lions.

== Amateur career ==
Payton was first drafted by the Minnesota Twins in the 31st round of the 2010 MLB draft out of St. Rita of Cascia High School in Chicago, Illinois. He did not sign with the Twins and went on to play college baseball at the University of Texas at Austin for the Longhorns. While at Texas, he had a Big-12 record 101 straight games getting on base. After his junior season he was drafted by the Cleveland Indians in the 16th round of the 2013 MLB draft, but did not sign and returned to Texas for his senior season. In 2013, he played collegiate summer baseball with the Cotuit Kettleers of the Cape Cod Baseball League. Payton played in 234 games during his four-year college career, batting .318/.425/.444 with seven home runs.

== Professional career ==
=== New York Yankees ===
Payton was then drafted by the New York Yankees in the seventh round of the 2014 MLB draft. He signed and spent 2014 with both the Charleston RiverDogs and Tampa Yankees, slashing .320/.418/.497 with four home runs over 48 total games.

In 2015, he played for both Tampa and the Trenton Thunder, batting a combined .267/.346/.368 with six home runs and 52 RBIs.

In 2016, he played for Tampa, Trenton, and the Scranton/Wilkes-Barre RailRiders, batting a combined .282/.358/.423 with ten home runs and 62 RBIs.

In 2017, he played for Trenton and Scranton/Wilkes-Barre, batting .256/.313/.389 with six home runs and 23 RBIs in 94 total games.

=== Oakland Athletics ===
During the 2018 Winter Meetings, the Oakland Athletics selected Payton from the Yankees in the minor league phase of the Rule 5 draft.

In 2019, Payton played for the AAA Las Vegas Aviators, batting .334/.400/.653 with 80 runs, 30 home runs, and 97 RBIs (8th in the Pacific Coast League) in 395 at bats. He was the PCL Player of the Week on July 14.

After the season, on October 10, 2019, he was selected for the United States national baseball team in the 2019 WBSC Premier 12.

=== Cincinnati Reds ===
On December 12, 2019, Payton was selected by the Cincinnati Reds in the 2019 Rule 5 draft. On July 21, 2020, Payton was returned by the Reds to the Athletics. On August 7, Payton was traded back to Cincinnati in exchange for cash considerations.

On August 22, Payton was selected to the major league roster. He made his major league debut that day against the St. Louis Cardinals. He finished the year 3-for-18 (.167) in 8 games with the Reds.

Payton was assigned to the Triple-A Louisville Bats to begin the 2021 season, and was designated for assignment on July 19, 2021 after hitting .182/.250/.182 with no home runs or RBI in 24 games with Cincinnati.

=== New York Mets ===
On July 24, 2021, Payton was traded to the New York Mets in exchange for cash considerations.

On November 30, 2021, Payton was non-tendered by the Mets, making him a free agent.

=== Chicago White Sox ===
On March 28, 2022, Payton signed a minor league deal with the Chicago White Sox organization. He was assigned to the Triple–A Charlotte Knights, where he hit .289/.365/.522 with 20 home runs and 77 RBI in 102 games. On September 3, the White Sox selected Payton's contract, adding him to the major league roster. In 8 games for Chicago, he went 3–for–21 (.143) with 1 RBI and 4 walks. On November 18, he was non–tendered and became a free agent. On November 21, the White Sox re–signed Payton to a minor league deal. He was released on December 26, in order to pursue an opportunity in Japan.

=== Saitama Seibu Lions ===
On December 26, 2022, Payton signed with the Saitama Seibu Lions of Nippon Professional Baseball. He became a free agent following the 2023 season.

=== Chicago White Sox (second stint) ===
On November 15, 2023, Payton signed a minor league contract with the Chicago White Sox. He made 112 appearances for the Triple-A Charlotte Knights, slashing .309/.383/.463 with 10 home runs, 53 RBI, and five stolen bases. Payton elected free agency following the season on November 4, 2024.

=== Toros de Tijuana ===
On May 28, 2025, Payton signed with the Toros de Tijuana of the Mexican League. In eight appearances for Tijuana, he went 1-for-22 (.045) with no home runs or RBI. Payton was released by the Toros on June 11.

=== Algodoneros de Unión Laguna ===
On July 2, 2025, Payton signed with the Algodoneros de Unión Laguna of the Mexican League. In 14 games he hit .222/.243/.389 with 1 home run and 3 RBIs. He was released on January 30, 2026.

== See also ==
- Rule 5 draft results
