= Armando Rivero =

Cuban baseball player

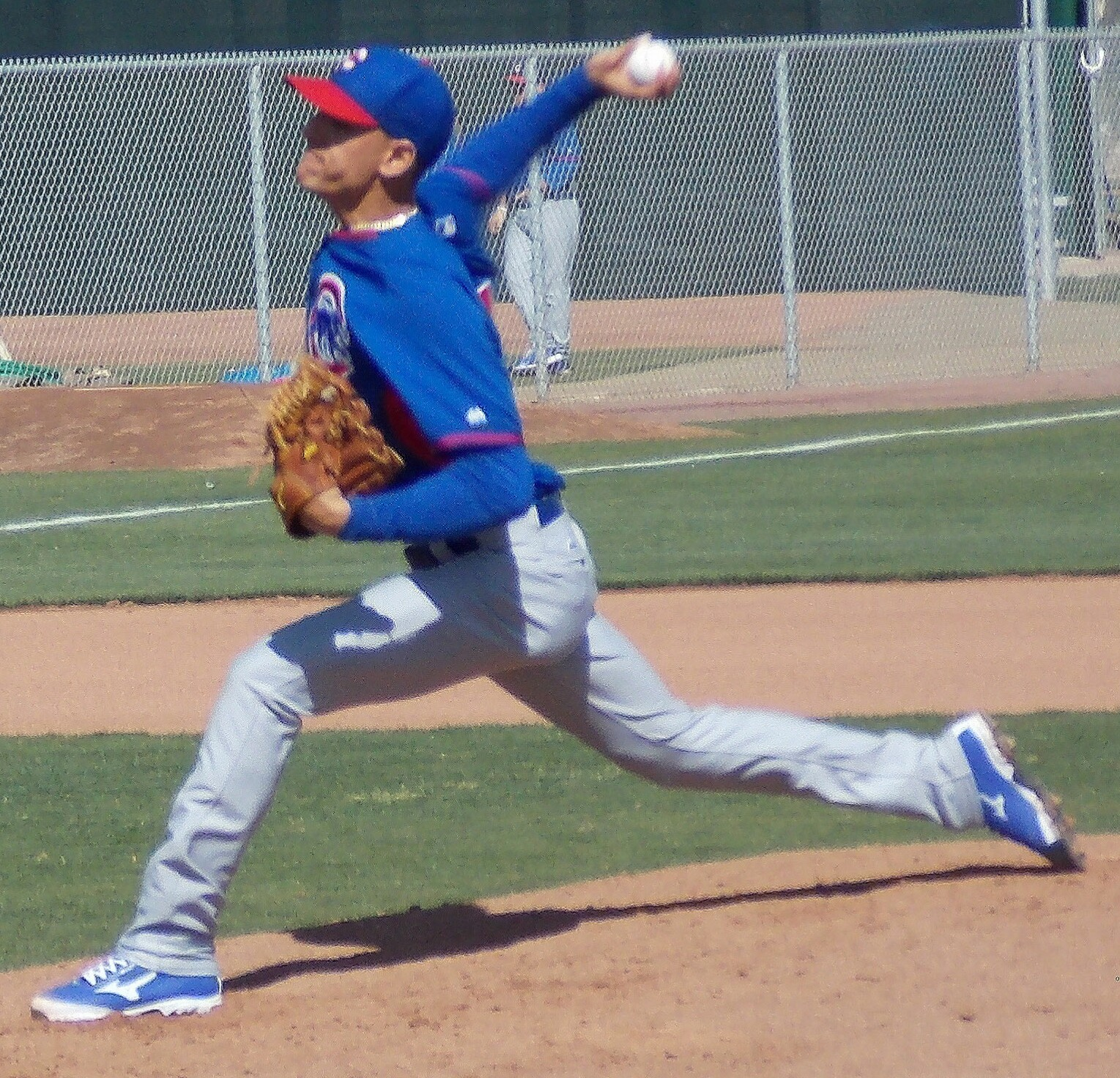
- Rivero pitching for the Chicago Cubs in 2014 Spring Training

Criollos de Caguas
- Pitcher
- Born: February 1, 1988 (age 38); La Habana, Cuba
- Bats: Right Throws: Right
- Stats at Baseball Reference

Armando Rivero Luzardo (born February 1, 1988) is a Cuban professional baseball pitcher who plays for Criollos de Caguas.

== Career ==
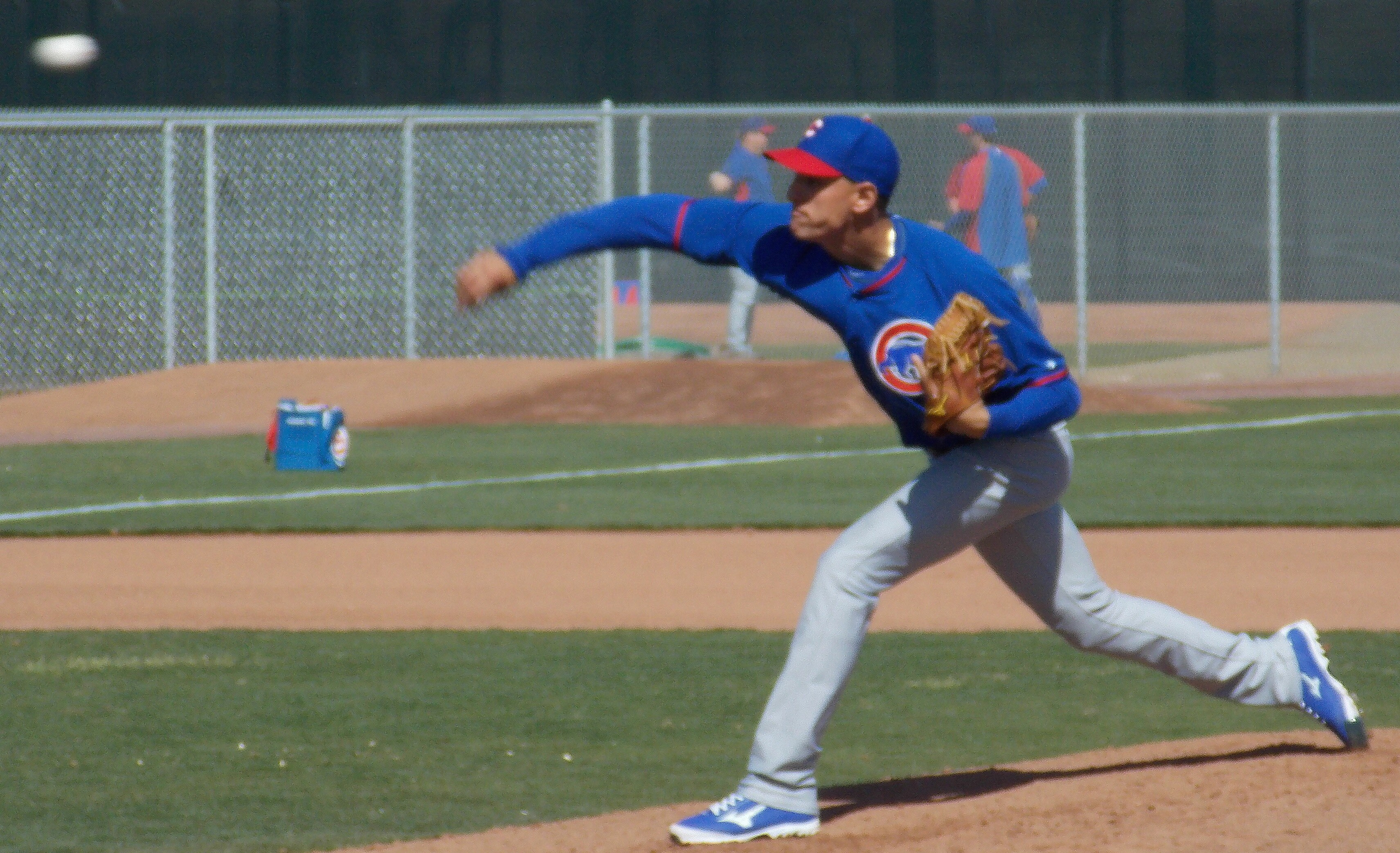
Rivero pitching for the Chicago Cubs in 2014 Spring Training

Rivero previously played for the Industriales in the Cuban National Series. After 2011 he defected from Cuba to pursue a Major League Baseball career. In March 2013, he signed a minor league contract with the Chicago Cubs worth $3.1 million. He made his debut in June of that year with the Kane County Cougars. He was later promoted to the Daytona Cubs and the Double-A Tennessee Smokies. He finished the season 0–1 with a 4.15 earned run average (ERA) and 45 strikeouts in 30 1/3 innings. After the season, he played in the Arizona Fall League. Rivero started the 2014 season back with Tennessee. He was promoted to the Triple-A Iowa Cubs in June. Rivero ended 2014 with a 5-1 record along with a 2.22 ERA. Rivero has been with Iowa since his 2014 promotion, posting a 3.16 ERA in 2015 and a 2.13 ERA in 2016.

On December 8, 2016, Rivero was selected by the Atlanta Braves in the 2016 Rule 5 draft. He was released on October 31, 2017.

On July 19, 2018, Rivero signed with the Piratas de Campeche of the Mexican Baseball League. He became a free agent after the season.

== See also ==
- Rule 5 draft results
