= Enderson Franco =

Venezuelan baseball player (born 1992)

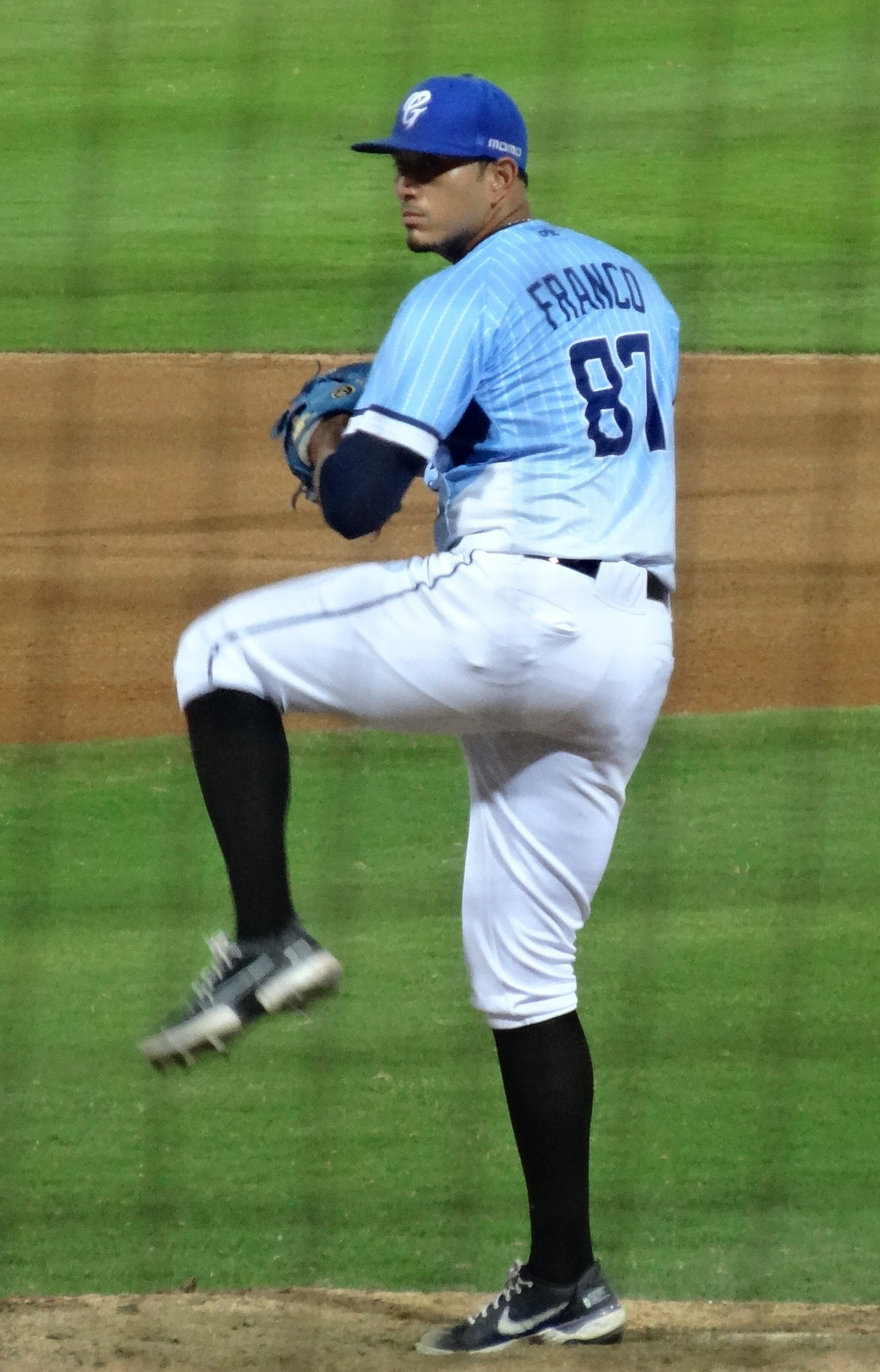
- Franco with the Fubon Guardians

Guerreros de Oaxaca – No. 46
- Pitcher
- Born: December 29, 1992 (age 33); Anaco, Venezuela
- Bats: Right Throws: Right

Professional debut
- MLB: September 18, 2019, for the San Francisco Giants
- KBO: April 6, 2021, for the Lotte Giants
- CPBL: July 5, 2022, for the Fubon Guardians

MLB statistics (through 2019 season)
- Win–loss record: 0–0
- Earned run average: 3.38
- Strikeouts: 4

KBO statistics (through 2021 season)
- Win–loss record: 9–8
- Earned run average: 5.40
- Strikeouts: 124

CPBL statistics (through 2025 season)
- Win–loss record: 14–13
- Earned run average: 1.86
- Strikeouts: 212
- Saves: 35
- Stats at Baseball Reference

Teams
- San Francisco Giants (2019); Lotte Giants (2021); Fubon Guardians (2022–2025)

Enderson Daniel Franco (born December 29, 1992) is a Venezuelan professional baseball pitcher for the Guerreros de Oaxaca of the Mexican League. He has previously played in Major League Baseball (MLB) for the San Francisco Giants, in the KBO League for the Lotte Giants, and in the Chinese Professional Baseball League (CPBL) for the Fubon Guardians. Franco was signed as an international free agent by the Houston Astros in 2009. He made his MLB debut in 2019.

== Career ==
=== Houston Astros ===
Franco was signed as an international free agent by the Houston Astros on July 4, 2009. He spent the 2010 with the DSL Astros, going 1–3 with a 3.67 ERA in 34 innings. He spent the 2011 season with the Gulf Coast Astros, going 1–2 with a 4.40 ERA in 47 innings. He returned to the GCL Astros in 2012, going 3–2 with a 4.86 ERA in 50 innings. In 2013, he played for the Greeneville Astros, going 2–5 with a 5.05 ERA in 51.2 innings.

=== Tampa Bay Rays ===
On December 13, 2013, Franco was selected by the Tampa Bay Rays in the minor league phase of the Rule 5 draft. He played for the Low-A Hudson Valley Renegades in 2014, going 7–3 with a 3.28 ERA and 50 strikeouts in 68 2/3 innings. Franco opened the 2015 season with the Bowling Green Hot Rods, going 5–6 with a 3.89 ERA and 47 strikeouts in 71 2/3 innings.

=== Miami Marlins ===
On July 3, 2015, Franco was traded to the Miami Marlins in exchange for international bonus slots. He finished the 2015 season with the Single-A Greensboro Grasshoppers, going 1–6 with 7.29 ERA and 37 strikeouts in 54 innings.

=== Atlanta Braves ===
On December 10, 2015, Franco was selected by the Atlanta Braves in the minor league phase of the Rule 5 draft. He played for the High-A Carolina Mudcats in 2016, going 6–12 with a 4.69 ERA and 97 strikeouts in 144 innings (3rd in the Carolina League). Franco was selected as a member of the Venezuela national baseball team at the 2017 World Baseball Classic. He split the 2017 season between the Single-A Rome Braves, High-A Florida Fire Frogs, and the Triple-A Gwinnett Braves, going 6–6 with a 3.86 ERA and 103 strikeouts in 120 innings. Franco split the 2018 season between the Double-A Mississippi Braves and Triple-A Gwinnett Stripers, going a combined 7–9 with a 3.85 ERA and 131 strikeouts in 132 innings. Franco elected free agency following the season in November 2, 2018.

=== San Francisco Giants ===
On January 24, 2019, Franco signed a minor league with the San Francisco Giants. He spent the 2019 minor league season with the Triple–A Sacramento River Cats, going 6–5 with a 5.97 ERA in 113 innings.

On September 15, 2019, the Giants selected Franco's contract and promoted him to the major leagues. He made his major league debut on September 18 versus the Boston Red Sox, allowing one run over one inning of relief. In 2019 in five relief appearances for the Giants, he pitched 5 1/3 innings and had a 3.38 ERA. On June 30, 2020, Franco was outrighted off of the 40-man roster. He did not play in a game in 2020 due to the cancellation of the minor league season because of the COVID-19 pandemic. Franco became a free agent on November 2.

=== Lotte Giants ===
On November 21, 2020, Franco signed a $245K contract with the Lotte Giants of the KBO League. The contract also includes a $55K signing bonus. He made his KBO debut on April 6, 2021. Franco became a free agent following the season.

=== Generales de Durango ===
On March 2, 2022, Franco signed with the Generales de Durango of the Mexican League. In 6 starts, he posted a 0–3 record with a 9.85 ERA over 28 1/3 innings pitched. Franco was released on May 25.

=== Fubon Guardians ===
On June 17, 2022, Franco signed with the Fubon Guardians of the Chinese Professional Baseball League. He appeared in 40 contests for the team down the stretch, recording a 4.41 ERA with 94 strikeouts and 10 saves in 100 innings pitched.

In 2023, Franco made 52 appearances out of the bullpen, recording a stellar 0.95 ERA with 71 strikeouts and 9 saves across 66 1/3 innings of work. Franco re-signed with the Guardians on January 15, 2024. In 61 relief appearances for the team, he compiled a 4-6 record and 2.34 ERA with 56 strikeouts and 20 saves across 57 2/3 innings pitched.

On February 14, 2025, Franco re-signed with the Guardians. In 37 relief appearances for the team, he posted a 4-1 record and 1.90 ERA with 34 strikeouts and one save across 42 2/3 innings pitched. On August 11, Franco was released by the Guardians. When questioned, manager Chin-Feng Chen explained that he was prioritizing starting pitchers over relievers.

=== Saraperos de Saltillo ===
On April 14, 2026, Franco signed with the Saraperos de Saltillo of the Mexican League. In 32 relief appearances for the Saraperos, he posted a 1–2 record with a 7.22 ERA, 23 strikeouts, and 12 walks across 28 2/3 innings pitched. On July 12, Franco was waived by Saltillo.

=== Guerreros de Oaxaca ===
On July 14, 2026, Franco was claimed off waivers by the Guerreros de Oaxaca of the Mexican League.

== See also ==
- Rule 5 draft results
