= Jason Szuminski =

American baseball player (born 1978)

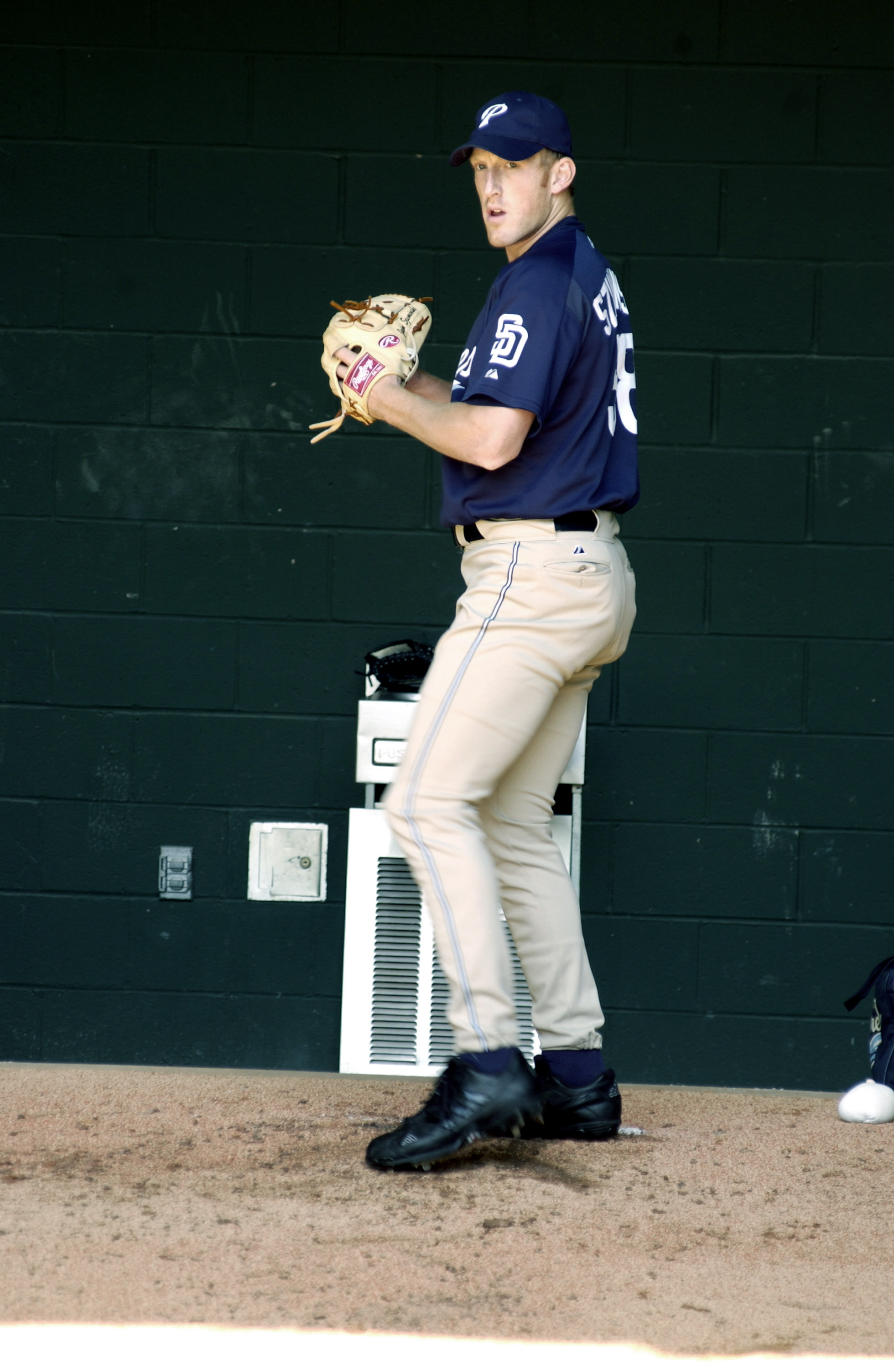
- Szuminski in 2004
- Pitcher
- Born: December 11, 1978 (age 47); San Diego, California, U.S.
- Batted: Right Threw: Right

MLB debut
- April 11, 2004, for the San Diego Padres

Last MLB appearance
- May 9, 2004, for the San Diego Padres

MLB statistics
- Win–loss record: 0-0
- Earned run average: 7.20
- Strikeouts: 5
- Stats at Baseball Reference

Teams
- San Diego Padres (2004)

Jason Ernest Szuminski (born December 11, 1978) is an American former professional baseball right-handed pitcher. He played in Major League Baseball (MLB) for the San Diego Padres in 2004. Szuminski is the first athlete from Massachusetts Institute of Technology and the first United States Air Force reservist to play in MLB.

== Career ==
Szuminski attended Massachusetts Institute of Technology (MIT) and played college baseball for the MIT Engineers. played collegiate summer baseball for the Newport Gulls of the New England Collegiate Baseball League. Szuminski was a 27th round draft pick in the 2000 Major League Baseball draft by the Chicago Cubs, and was signed by Cubs' scout Tom Shafer. He obtained his degree at MIT in Aeronautical and Astronautical Engineering.

Szuminski spent his rookie season in 2000 splitting time between the Cubs rookie league affiliate in Arizona and the short-season Single-A Lansing Lugnuts. He finished the season with a combined record of 5–2 with the 2 squads and a combined ERA of 2.76 in 62 innings pitched. In 2001, Szuminski would spend the entire season with Lansing going 4–3 with a 6.44 ERA in 36.1 innings mainly out of the bullpen. Jason was promoted to the Cubs high Single-A team, The Daytona Cubs for the 2002 season. He responded with a solid 5–2 record and a 5.12 ERA in 39 appearances, most of which, were again out of the bullpen. In 2003 Szuminski would play at all 3 levels of minor league baseball, splitting time again with the Daytona Cubs of Single-A, as well as the Double-A West Tenn Diamond Jaxx and the Triple-A Iowa Cubs. He put forth a great season combining for a 9–5 record with a 2.78 ERA in a total of 97 innings pitched. He would make a total of 45 appearances, 40 of which were in relief and also recorded 2 saves.

At the end of the 2003 season he was a Rule 5 draft pick by the San Diego Padres in and earned a spot on the 25-man major league roster for the 2004 season through a strong showing in spring training. Szuminski made his Major League debut on April 11, 2004. In his first major league appearance, a nationally televised Sunday night game against the San Francisco Giants, Szuminski pitched a scoreless inning, in the process recording the third out against home run champion Barry Bonds on a long fly ball to the warning track. During his brief stint in the majors, Szuminski, on account of his military background, was selected to toss out the ceremonial first pitch for the Padres on their first ever "Military Appreciation Night" (April 15, 2004) to honor the large armed forces community in the San Diego area.

Due to the Padres' early-season successes, Szuminski, a long reliever out of the bullpen, saw limited game action. In May 2004, he was dropped from the Padres' 25-man roster and returned to the Cubs (per terms of the Rule 5 draft) after incurring just 37 days of major league service.

While he was finishing the year with the Cubs' Triple-A affiliate in Iowa, Szuminski injured his throwing shoulder and was released by the organization. He was 3–2 with Iowa with a 4.94 ERA prior to his release. He has since been out of baseball.
