= 2003 St. Louis Cardinals season =

Major League Baseball season

2003 St. Louis Cardinals
- League: National League
- Division: Central
- Ballpark: Busch Memorial Stadium
- City: St. Louis, Missouri
- Record: 85–77 (.525)
- Divisional place: 3rd
- Owners: William DeWitt, Jr.
- General managers: Walt Jocketty
- Managers: Tony La Russa
- Television: Fox Sports Midwest (Joe Buck, Dan McLaughlin, Al Hrabosky); KPLR (Bob Carpenter, Rick Horton)
- Radio: KMOX (Mike Shannon, Wayne Hagin)

The 2003 St. Louis Cardinals season was the 122nd season for the St. Louis Cardinals, a Major League Baseball franchise in St. Louis, Missouri. It was the 112th season for the Cardinals in the National League and their 38th in Busch Memorial Stadium.

The Cardinals went 85–77 during the season and finished third in the National League Central, three games behind the Chicago Cubs, who won the NL Central at 88–74, and two behind the NL Central runners-up, the Houston Astros (87–75).

Catcher Mike Matheny, shortstop Édgar Rentería, third baseman Scott Rolen, and outfielder Jim Edmonds won Gold Gloves this year.

== Offseason ==
- December 13, 2002: Chris Carpenter was signed as a free agent with the St. Louis Cardinals.

== Regular season ==
=== Opening Day starters ===
- Jim Edmonds
- Eli Marrero
- Tino Martinez
- Mike Matheny
- Matt Morris
- Albert Pujols
- Édgar Rentería
- Scott Rolen
- Fernando Viña

=== Season standings ===
==== National League Central ====
NL Central
Team	W	L	Pct.	GB	Home	Road
Chicago Cubs	88	74	.543	—	44‍–‍37	44‍–‍37
Houston Astros	87	75	.537	1	48‍–‍33	39‍–‍42
St. Louis Cardinals	85	77	.525	3	48‍–‍33	37‍–‍44
Pittsburgh Pirates	75	87	.463	13	39‍–‍42	36‍–‍45
Cincinnati Reds	69	93	.426	19	35‍–‍46	34‍–‍47
Milwaukee Brewers	68	94	.420	20	31‍–‍50	37‍–‍44

==== Record vs. opponents ====
2003 National League record Source: MLB Standings Grid – 2003
Team	AZ	ATL	CHC	CIN	COL	FLA	HOU	LAD	MIL	MON	NYM	PHI	PIT	SD	SF	STL	AL
Arizona	—	2–5	2–4	7–2	10–9	2–5	5–1	10–9	3–3	4–2	4–2	4–2	3–3	9–10	5–14	3–3	11–4
Atlanta	5–2	—	4–2	3–3	6–0	9–10	5–1	4–2	4–2	12–7	11–8	9–10	7–2	6–1	2–4	4–2	10–5
Chicago	4–2	2–4	—	10–7	3–3	4–2	9–7	2–4	10–6	3–3	5–1	1–5	10–8	4–2	4–2	8–9	9–9
Cincinnati	2–7	3–3	7–10	—	4–2	2–4	5–12	2–4	8–10	2–4	2–4	5–4	5–11	3–3	3–3	9–7	7–5
Colorado	9–10	0–6	3–3	2–4	—	4–2	2–4	7–12	5–1	3–4	2–5	2–4	3–6	12–7	7–12	4–2	9–6
Florida	5–2	10–9	2–4	4–2	2–4	—	1–5	2–5	7–2	13–6	12–7	13–6	2–4	5–1	1–5	3–3	9–6
Houston	1–5	1–5	7–9	12–5	4–2	5–1	—	4–2	9–8	3–3	2–4	2–4	10–6	3–3	2–4	11–7	11–7
Los Angeles	9–10	2–4	4–2	4–2	12–7	5–2	2–4	—	4–2	4–2	3–3	2–5	5–1	8–11	6–13	4–2	11–7
Milwaukee	3–3	2–4	6–10	10–8	1–5	2–7	8–9	2–4	—	0–6	6–3	4–2	10–7	5–1	1–5	3–13	5–7
Montreal	2–4	7–12	3–3	4–2	4–3	6–13	3–3	2–4	6–0	—	14–5	8–11	3–3	4–2	7–0	1–5	9–9
New York	2–4	8–11	1–5	4–2	5–2	7–12	4–2	3–3	3–6	5–14	—	7–12	4–2	3–3	4–2	1–5	5–10
Philadelphia	2–4	10–9	5–1	4–5	4–2	6–13	4–2	5–2	2–4	11–8	12–7	—	2–4	4–3	3–3	4–2	8–7
Pittsburgh	3–3	2–7	8–10	11–5	6–3	4–2	6–10	1–5	7–10	3–3	2–4	4–2	—	4–2	2–4	7–10	5–7
San Diego	10–9	1–6	2–4	3–3	7–12	1–5	3–3	11–8	1–5	2–4	3–3	3–4	2–4	—	5–14	2–4	8–10
San Francisco	14–5	4–2	2–4	3–3	12–7	5–1	4–2	13–6	5–1	0–7	2–4	3–3	4–2	14–5	—	5–1	10–8
St. Louis	3–3	2–4	9–8	7–9	2–4	3–3	7–11	2–4	13–3	5–1	5–1	2–4	10–7	4–2	1–5	—	10–8

=== Transactions ===
- May 27, 2003: Scott Seabol was signed as a free agent with the St. Louis Cardinals.

=== Game log ===
2003 St. Louis Cardinals Game Log (85–77)
March: (1–0)

#	Date	Opponent	Score	Win	Loss	Save	Attendance	Record
1	March 31	Brewers	11–9	Springer	DeJean	Kline	49,561	1–0

April: (12–12)

#	Date	Opponent	Score	Win	Loss	Save	Attendance	Record
2	April 2	Brewers	7–0	W. Williams	Rusch		26,790	2–0
3	April 3	Brewers	6–4	Stephenson	Kinney	Kline	26,952	3–0
4	April 4	Astros	5–6	Stone	Springer	Lidge	32,661	3–1
5	April 5	Astros	1–2	Munro	Fassero	Wagner	33,878	3–2
6	April 8	@ Rockies	15–12	Eldred	Miceli		21,563	4–2
7	April 9	@ Rockies	4–9	Cruz	Tomko		24,110	4–3
8	April 10	@ Rockies	6–7	Lopez	Kline	Jimenez	24,586	4–4
9	April 11	@ Astros	2–3	Dotel	Morris		25,185	4–5
10	Apr 12	@ Astros	3–0	W. Williams	Redding	Hermanson	33,509	5–5
11	April 13	@ Astros	11–8	Calero	Oswalt		30,078	6–5
12	April 14	@ Brewers	7–5	Tomko	Ritchie	Kline	10,684	7–5
13	April 15	@ Brewers	1–6	Sheets	Stephenson		12,149	7–6
14	April 16	@ Brewers	15–2	Morris	Franklin		12,387	8–6
15	April 18	D'Backs	6–3	W. Williams	Dessens		36,239	9–6
16	April 19	D'Backs	3–4	Kim	Simontacchi	Mantei	38,742	9–7
17	April 20	D'Backs	0–1	Villarreal	Tomko	Mantei	26,152	9–8
18	April 22	@ Braves	3–5	Ortiz	Stephenson	Smoltz	20,969	9–9
19	April 23	@ Braves	2–4	Maddux	Morris	Smoltz	21,338	9–10
20	April 24	@ Braves	3–4	King	Kline		24,184	9–11
21	April 25	@ Marlins	9–2	Tomko	Burnett		12,081	10–11
22	April 26	@ Marlins	3–5	Beckett	Kline	Looper	12,286	10–12
23	April 27	@ Marlins	7–6	Kline	Pavano		10,075	11–12
24	April 29	Mets	13–3	Morris	Leiter		30,275	12–12
25	April 30	Mets	13–4	W. Williams	Astacio		30,265	13–12

May: (14–15)

#	Date	Opponent	Score	Win	Loss	Save	Attendance	Record
26	May 1	Mets	6–5	Eldred	Strickland		35,283	14–12
27	May 2	Expos	8–1	Simontacchi	Ohka		41,810	15–12
28	May 3	Expos	3–1	Stephenson	Vargas	Calero	36,176	16–12
29	May 4	Expos	6–2	Morris	Vazquez		39,605	17–12
30	May 5	@ Reds	4–5	Williamson	Hermanson		20,145	17–13
31	May 6	@ Reds	5–6	Reitsma	Calero		25,917	17–14
32	May 7	@ Reds	2–4	Graves	Simontacchi	Williamson	20,849	17–15
33	May 8	@ Reds	6–8	Sullivan	Crudale	Williamson	30,567	17–16
34	May 9	@ Cubs	6–3	Morris	Zambrano	Fassero	38,531	18–16
35	May 10	@ Cubs	2–3	Remlinger	Eldred		38,106	18–17
36	May 13	Reds	2–7	Wilson	Simontacchi		34,276	18–18
37	May 14	Reds	0–4	Graves	Morris		31,731	18–19
38	May 15	Reds	6–3	Stephenson	Riedling	Eldred	37,904	19–19
39	May 16	Cubs	7–4	W. Williams	Clement	Eldred	42,589	20–19
40	May 17	Cubs	1–2	Remlinger	Kline	Borowski	45,385	20–20
41	May 18	Cubs	6–3	Hermanson	Cruz	Eldred	45,773	21–20
42	May 19	Cubs	2–0	Morris	Zambrano		46,734	22–20
43	May 20	@ Astros	2–3	Miller	Stephenson	Wagner	23,623	22–21
44	May 21	@ Astros	7–4	W. Williams	Munro	Eldred	22,441	23–21
45	May 22	@ Astros	2–5	Robertson	Tomko	Wagner	23,866	23–22
46	May 23	@ Pirates	10–8	Eldred	Meadows	Fassero	18,660	24–22
47	May 24	@ Pirates	6–0	Morris	Suppan		35,733	25–22
48	May 25	@ Pirates	7–8	Boehringer	Hermanson	M. Williams	25,983	25–23
49	May 26	Astros	10–5	W. Williams	Munro		35,600	26–23
50	May 27	Astros	4–7	Robertson	Tomko	Wagner	32,476	26–24
51	May 28	Astros	3–1	Simontacchi	Johnson		28,667	27–24
52	May 29	Astros	4–7	Saarloos	Fassero	Wagner	41,977	27–25
53	May 30	Pirates	3–7	Suppan	Stephenson		30,599	27–26
54	May 31	Pirates	3–4	Wells	W. Williams	M. Williams	43,789	27–27

June: (16–11)

#	Date	Opponent	Score	Win	Loss	Save	Attendance	Record
55	June 1	Pirates	5–4	Kline	Beimel	Fassero	46,103	28–27
56	June 3	Blue Jays	11–5	Morris	Escobar		28,907	29–27
57	June 4	Blue Jays	8–5	Simontacchi	Lidle	Eldred	28,840	30–27
58	June 5	Blue Jays	13–5	W. Williams	Hendrickson		33,729	31–27
59	June 6	Orioles	8–6	Yan	Julio	Eldred	34,817	32–27
60	June 7	Orioles	1–8	Ponson	Stephenson		43,369	32–28
61	June 8	Orioles	11–10	Simontacchi	Driskill	Eldred	33,313	33–28
62	June 10	@ Red Sox	9–7	Kline	Lyon	Eldred	34,937	34–28
63	June 11	@ Red Sox	1–13	Burkett	Tomko		33,453	34–29
64	June 12	@ Red Sox	8–7	Yan	Mendoza		34,389	35–29
65	June 13	@ Yankees	2–5	Clemens	Simontacchi	Rivera	55,214	35–30
66	June 14	@ Yankees	4–13	Pettitte	Morris		55,174	35–31
67	June 15	@ Yankees	2–5	Mussina	W. Williams	Rivera	54,797	35–32
68	June 16	@ Brewers	4–9	Leskanic	Eldred		24,951	35–33
69	June 17	@ Brewers	12–3	Stephenson	Kinney		16,659	36–33
70	June 18	@ Brewers	9–1	Simontacchi	Rusch		17,495	37–33
71	June 19	@ Brewers	8–4	Tomko	Quevedo	Isringhausen	20,776	38–33
72	June 20	Royals	4–10	Lima	Morris		38,226	38–34
73	June 21	Royals	8–1	W. Williams	May		44,473	39–34
74	June 22	Royals	2–5	Affeldt	Stephenson	MacDougal	39,962	39–35
75	June 24	Reds	4–7	Heredia	Fassero	Graves	33,352	39–36
76	June 25	Reds	9–6	Morris	Wilson	Isringhausen	34,863	40–36
77	June 26	Reds	11–7	W. Williams	Anderson		34,738	41–36
78	June 27	@ Royals	3–6	May	Stephenson	MacDougal	40,189	41–37
79	June 28	@ Royals	13–9	Fassero	Affeldt		40,347	42–37
80	June 29	@ Royals	13–6	Tomko	George		38,270	43–37
81	June 30	Giants	1–5	Schmidt	Haren		33,873	43–38

July: (13–14)

#	Date	Opponent	Score	Win	Loss	Save	Attendance	Record
82	July 1	Giants	1–5	Brower	W. Williams		39,894	43–39
83	July 2	Giants	1–4	J. Williams	Stephenson	Worrell	33,835	43–40
84	July 3	Giants	9–5	Simontacchi	Rueter		38,129	44–40
85	July 4	@ Cubs	11–8	Tomko	Wood		39,756	45–40
86	July 5	@ Cubs	5–6	Remlinger	Fassero		38,953	45–41
87	July 6	@ Cubs	4–1	W. Williams	Prior	Isringhausen	37,713	46–41
88	July 7	@ Giants	1–5	J. Williams	Stephenson		42,674	46–42
89	July 8	@ Giants	3–8	Brower	Haren		42,672	46–43
90	July 9	Dodgers	5–6	Ishii	Tomko	Gagné	32,325	46–44
91	July 10	Dodgers	4–9	Perez	Morris	Quantrill	35,610	46–45
92	July 11	Padres	4–2	W. Williams	Lawrence	Isringhausen	33,725	47–45
93	July 12	Padres	9–7	Simontacchi	Herges		48,774	48–45
94	July 13	Padres	3–1	Simontacchi	Matthews	Isringhausen	48,102	49–45
95	July 17	@ Dodgers	3–6	Nomo	Stephenson	Gagné	40,331	49–46
96	July 18	@ Dodgers	5–8	Ishii	Eldred	Gagné	43,504	49–47
97	July 19	@ Dodgers	3–1	Haren	Brown	Isringhausen	41,195	50–47
98	July 20	@ Dodgers	10–7	W. Williams	Perez	Isringhausen	46,110	51–47
99	July 21	@ Padres	4–5	Witasick	Painter		26,881	51–48
100	July 22	@ Padres	2–3	Pérez	Fassero	Beck	22,291	51–49
101	July 23	@ Padres	8–4	Tomko	Lawrence		20,574	52–49
102	July 25	Pirates	5–10	Meadows	Eldred		45,296	52–50
103	July 26	Pirates	13–8	W. Williams	Fogg	Isringhausen	44,249	53–50
104	July 27	Pirates	4–3	Eldred	Lincoln		34,851	54–50
105	July 28	Pirates	0–3	Suppan	Tomko		33,977	54–51
106	July 29	@ Expos	2–1	Stephenson	Hernandez		7,418	55–51
107	July 30	@ Expos	11–1	Haren	Vargas		6,129	56–51
108	July 31	@ Expos	2–3	Day	W. Williams	Biddle	9,145	56–52

August: (16–12)

#	Date	Opponent	Score	Win	Loss	Save	Attendance	Record
109	August 1	@ Mets	8–2	Kline	Wheeler		23,578	57–52
110	August 2	@ Mets	10–9	Tomko	Seo	Yan	30,898	58–52
111	August 3	@ Mets	5–13	Griffiths	Stephenson		27,592	58–53
112	August 5	Marlins	0–4	Penny	W. Williams		35,468	58–54
113	August 6	Marlins	3–7	Willis	Haren		31,606	58–55
114	August 7	Marlins	3–0	Tomko	Beckett	Isringhausen	31,002	59–55
115	August 8	Braves	2–7	Ortiz	Fassero		45,796	59–56
116	August 9	Braves	3–1	Stephenson	Reynolds	Isringhausen	47,692	60–56
117	August 10	Braves	3–2	Eldred	Smoltz	Isringhausen	39,320	61–56
118	August 11	@ Pirates	6–4	Haren	Wells	Isringhausen	17,647	62–56
119	August 12	@ Pirates	10–6	Tomko	Fogg	Simontacchi	21,013	63–56
120	August 13	@ Pirates	5–6	Tavárez	Borbón		18,505	63–57
121	August 14	@ Pirates	4–3	Stephenson	D'Amico	Isringhausen	16,157	64–57
122	August 15	@ Phillies	4–7	Padilla	W. Williams	Plesac	28,962	64–58
123	August 16	@ Phillies	4–5	Myers	Haren	Mesa	35,046	64–59
124	August 17	@ Phillies	4–6	Telemaco	Tomko	M. Williams	42,153	64–60
125	August 19	Pirates	13–5	Eldred	Beimel		28,869	65–60
126	August 20	Pirates	0–14	D'Amico	Stephenson		25,741	65–61
127	August 21	Pirates	6–3	Eldred	Lincoln		26,849	66–61
128	August 22	Phillies	4–9	Cormier	Kline		33,824	66–62
129	August 23	Phillies	5–3	Hitchcock	Telemaco	Isringhausen	37,318	67–62
130	August 24	Phillies	3–0	Tomko	Millwood	DeJean	37,679	68–62
131	August 26	Cubs	4–7	Prior	Stephenson		36,563	68–63
132	August 27	Cubs	4–2	Kline	Farnsworth	Isringhausen	32,667	69–63
133	August 28	Cubs	3–2	DeJean	Remlinger		37,370	70–63
134	August 29	@ Reds	5–8	Bale	Haren	Graves	27,121	70–64
135	August 30	@ Reds	6–3	Tomko	Harang	Isringhausen	39,380	71–64
136	August 31	@ Reds	5–0	Hitchcock	Serafini		29,272	72–64

September: (13–13)

#	Date	Opponent	Score	Win	Loss	Save	Attendance	Record
137	September 1	@ Cubs	0–7	Prior	W. Williams		38,410	72–65
138	September 2	@ Cubs	2–4	Guthrie	Fassero		31,990	72–66
139	September 2 (2)	@ Cubs	2–0	Morris	Wood	Isringhausen	39,290	73–66
140	September 3	@ Cubs	7–8	Borowski	W. Williams		32,710	73–67
141	September 4	@ Cubs	6–7	Remlinger	DeJean	Borowski	35,129	73–68
142	September 5	Reds	2–4	Randall	Simontacchi	Reitsma	29,608	73–69
143	September 6	Reds	13–6	W. Williams	Serafini		39,718	74–69
144	September 7	Reds	9–0	Morris	Etherton		34,389	75–69
145	September 9	Rockies	1–8	Jennings	Haren		27,591	75–70
146	September 10	Rockies	10–2	Tomko	Elarton		25,396	76–70
147	September 11	Rockies	4–9	Oliver	Hitchcock		28,801	76–71
148	September 12	@ Astros	5–14	Miller	W. Williams		35,633	76–72
149	September 13	@ Astros	0–2	Oswalt	Morris	Wagner	42,435	76–73
150	September 14	@ Astros	1–4	Redding	Haren	Wagner	37,548	76–74
151	September 15	Brewers	11–2	Tomko	Obermueller		27,925	77–74
152	September 16	Brewers	6–5	Hitchcock	L. Martinez	Isringhausen	27,405	78–74
153	September 17	Brewers	6–7	Estrella	Isringhausen	Kolb	27,567	78–75
154	September 18	Brewers	13–0	W. Williams	Kinney		29,729	79–75
155	September 19	Astros	1–8	Oswalt	Morris		38,997	79–76
156	September 20	Astros	3–2	Simontacchi	Miceli		44,878	80–76
157	September 21	Astros	6–4	Hitchcock	Robertson	Isringhausen	41,397	81–76
158	September 23	@ Brewers	5–1	W. Williams	Sheets		15,042	82–76
159	September 24	@ Brewers	8–4	Morris	Kinney	Isringhausen	21,965	83–76
160	September 26	@ D'Backs	6–7	Randolph	Tomko	Mantei	37,180	83–77
161	September 27	@ D'Backs	3–2	Hitchcock	Capuano	Isringhausen	39,650	84–77
162	September 28	@ D'Backs	9–5	W. Williams	Webb	Isringhausen	42,882	85–77

=== Roster ===
2003 St. Louis Cardinals
Roster
Pitchers: 52 Pedro Borbón Jr.; 77,40 Kiko Calero; 54 Mike Crudale; 47 Mike DeJean; 23 Cal Eldred; 13 Jeff Fassero; 50 Dan Haren; 32 Dustin Hermanson; 41 Sterling Hitchcock; 44 Jason Isringhausen; 77 Jimmy Journell; 49 Steve Kline; 56 Gabe Molina; 35 Matt Morris; 43 Kevin Ohme; 28 Lance Painter; 60 Josh Pearce; 53 Jason Pearson; 46 Jason Simontacchi; 48 Russ Springer; 30 Brett Tomko; 19 Woody Williams; 43 Esteban Yan	Catchers: 8 Joe Girardi; 22 Mike Matheny; 50,32 Chris Widger; Infielders: 41,12 Miguel Cairo; 47 Wilson Delgado; 31 Bo Hart; 21 Tino Martinez; 3 Édgar Rentería; 27 Scott Rolen; 4 Fernando Viña	Outfielders: 7 J. D. Drew; 15 Jim Edmonds; 26 Eli Marrero; 16 Orlando Palmeiro; 33 Eduardo Pérez; 5 Albert Pujols; 0 Kerry Robinson; 99 So Taguchi	Manager: 10 Tony La Russa; Coaches: 18 Dave Duncan (pitching); 38 Marty Mason (bullpen); 39 Dave McKay (first base); 11 José Oquendo (third base); 12 Mitchell Page (hitting); 24 Joe Pettini (bench)

== Player stats ==
=== Batting ===
==== Starters by position ====
Note: Pos = Position; G = Games played; AB = At bats; H = Hits; Avg. = Batting average; HR = Home runs; RBI = Runs batted in

Player	Pos	G	AB	H	Avg.	HR	RBI
Albert Pujols	LF	157	591	212	.359	43	124
Edgar Renteria	SS	157	587	194	.330	13	100
J.D. Drew	RF	100	287	83	.289	15	42
Scott Rolen	3B	154	559	160	.286	28	104
Bo Hart	2B	77	296	82	.277	4	28
Jim Edmonds	CF	137	447	123	.275	39	89
Tino Martinez	1B	138	476	130	.273	15	69
Mike Matheny	C	141	441	111	.252	8	47

==== Other batters ====
Note: G = Games played; AB = At bats; H = Hits; Avg. = Batting average; HR = Home runs; RBI = Runs batted in

Player	G	AB	H	Avg.	HR	RBI
Orlando Palmeiro	141	317	86	.271	3	33
Miguel Cairo	92	261	64	.245	5	32
Fernando Viña	61	259	65	.251	4	23
Eduardo Pérez	105	253	72	.285	11	41
Kerry Robinson	116	208	52	.250	1	16
Eli Marrero	41	107	24	.224	2	20
Chris Widger	44	102	24	.235	0	14
Wilson Delgado	43	77	13	.169	0	3
So Taguchi	43	54	14	.259	3	13
Joe Girardi	16	23	3	.130	0	1

=== Pitching ===
==== Starting pitchers ====
Note: G = Games pitched; IP = Innings pitched; W = Wins; L = Losses; ERA = Earned run average; SO = Strikeouts

Player	G	IP	W	L	ERA	SO
Woody Williams	34	220.2	18	9	3.87	153
Brett Tomko	33	202.2	13	9	5.28	114
Garrett Stephenson	32	174.1	7	13	4.59	91
Matt Morris	27	172.1	11	8	3.76	120
Dan Haren	14	72.2	3	7	5.08	43
Sterling Hitchcock	8	38.0	5	1	3.79	32

==== Other pitchers ====
Note: G = Games pitched; IP = Innings pitched; W = Wins; L = Losses; ERA = Earned run average; SO = Strikeouts

Player	G	IP	W	L	ERA	SO
Jason Simontacchi	46	126.1	9	5	5.56	74

==== Relief pitchers ====
Note: G = Games pitched; W = Wins; L = Losses; SV = Saves; ERA = Earned run average; SO = Strikeouts

Player	G	W	L	SV	ERA	SO
Jason Isringhausen	40	0	1	22	2.36	41
Steve Kline	78	5	5	3	3.82	31
Jeff Fassero	62	1	7	3	5.68	55
Cal Eldred	62	7	4	8	3.74	67
Esteban Yan	39	2	0	1	6.02	28
Kiko Calero	26	1	1	1	2.82	51
Dustin Hermanson	23	1	2	1	5.46	12
Lance Painter	22	0	1	0	5.50	11
Mike DeJean	18	1	1	1	4.00	13
Russ Springer	17	1	1	0	8.31	11
Mike Crudale	13	0	1	0	2.38	6
Jimmy Journell	7	0	0	0	6.00	8
Josh Pearce	7	0	0	0	3.00	4
Pedro Borbón Jr.	7	0	1	0	20.25	0
Gabe Molina	3	0	0	0	13.50	1
Kevin Ohme	2	0	0	0	0.00	2
Jason Pearson	2	0	0	0	63.00	1

== Farm system ==
Level	Team	League	Manager
AAA	Memphis Redbirds	Pacific Coast League	Tom Spencer and Danny Sheaffer
AA	Tennessee Smokies	Southern League	Mark DeJohn
A	Palm Beach Cardinals	Florida State League	Tom Nieto
A	Peoria Chiefs	Midwest League	Joe Cunningham, Jr.
A-Short Season	New Jersey Cardinals	New York–Penn League	Tommy Shields
Rookie	Johnson City Cardinals	Appalachian League	Ron Warner
