= 2003 Pittsburgh Pirates season =

2003 Pittsburgh Pirates
- League: National League
- Division: Central
- Ballpark: PNC Park
- City: Pittsburgh, Pennsylvania
- Record: 75–87 (.463)
- Divisional place: 4th
- Owners: Kevin McClatchy
- General managers: Dave Littlefield
- Managers: Lloyd McClendon
- Television: Fox Sports Net Pittsburgh
- Radio: KDKA-AM (Steve Blass, Greg Brown, Lanny Frattare, Bob Walk)

The 2003 Pittsburgh Pirates season was the 122nd season of the franchise; the 117th in the National League. This was their third season at PNC Park. The Pirates finished fourth in the National League Central with a record of 75–87 and missed the playoffs for the 11th consecutive season.

== Offseason ==
- November 25, 2002: Randall Simon was traded by the Detroit Tigers to the Pittsburgh Pirates for a player to be named later and Adrian Burnside (minors). The Pittsburgh Pirates sent Roberto Novoa (December 16, 2002) to the Detroit Tigers to complete the trade.
- January 28, 2003: Jeff D'Amico was signed as a free agent with the Pittsburgh Pirates.
- March 14, 2003: Kenny Lofton signed as a free agent with the Pittsburgh Pirates.

== Regular season ==
- June 24, 2003 – Brad Wilkerson of the Montreal Expos hit for the cycle in a game against the Pirates.

=== Season standings ===
NL Central
Team	W	L	Pct.	GB	Home	Road
Chicago Cubs	88	74	.543	—	44‍–‍37	44‍–‍37
Houston Astros	87	75	.537	1	48‍–‍33	39‍–‍42
St. Louis Cardinals	85	77	.525	3	48‍–‍33	37‍–‍44
Pittsburgh Pirates	75	87	.463	13	39‍–‍42	36‍–‍45
Cincinnati Reds	69	93	.426	19	35‍–‍46	34‍–‍47
Milwaukee Brewers	68	94	.420	20	31‍–‍50	37‍–‍44

=== Game log ===
2003 Game Log (75–87)
March (1–0) April (11–14)

#	Date	Opponent	Score	Win	Loss	Save	Attendance	Record
1	March 31	@ Reds	10–1	**Benson** (1–0)	Haynes	—	42,343	1–0
2	April 2	@ Reds	7–4	**Torres** (1–0)	Manzanillo	**Williams** (1)	22,878	2–0
3	April 3	@ Reds	7–5	**Fogg** (1–0)	Anderson	**Williams** (2)	26,096	3–0
4	April 4	@ Phillies	9–1	**Suppan** (1–0)	Roa	**Torres** (1)	59,269	4–0
5	April 5	@ Phillies	1–16	Silva	**D'Amico** (0–1)	—	22,693	4–1
6	April 6	@ Phillies	2–0	**Benson** (2–0)	Myers	**Williams** (3)	30,113	5–1
7	April 8	Brewers	3–5	Rusch	**Wells** (0–1)	DeJean	36,003	5–2
8	April 9	Brewers	2–3	Ritchie	**Fogg** (1–1)	DeJean	23,332	5–3
9	April 10	Brewers	3–1	**Suppan** (2–0)	Sheets	**Williams** (4)	10,384	6–3
10	April 11	@ Cubs	3–2	**D'Amico** (1–1)	Zambrano	**Williams** (5)	33,605	7–3
11	April 12	@ Cubs	0–4	Wood	**Benson** (2–1)	Borowski	35,226	7–4
12	April 13	@ Cubs	3–4	Farnsworth	**Boehringer** (0–1)	Borowski	29,558	7–5
13	April 15	Mets	1–3	Glavine	**Fogg** (1–2)	Benitez	14,728	7–6
14	April 16	Mets	6–3	**Suppan** (3–0)	Cone	—	12,609	8–6
15	April 17	Mets	2–7	Seo	**D'Amico** (1–2)	—	11,299	8–7
16	April 18	Cubs	2–7	Clement	**Benson** (2–2)	—	15,037	8–8
17	April 19	Cubs	1–6 (10)	Prior	**Sauerbeck** (0–1)	—	31,518	8–9
18	April 20	Cubs	8–2	**Torres** (2–0)	Estes	—	14,854	9–9
19	April 22	Giants	5–2	**Suppan** (4–0)	Foppert	—	10,650	10–9
20	April 23	Giants	3–4 (13)	Brower	**Tavarez** (0–1)	—	13,009	10–10
21	April 24	Giants	1–3	Moss	**Benson** (2–3)	Worrell	15,967	10–11
22	April 25	Dodgers	2–5	Brohawn	**Williams** (0–1)	Gagne	16,090	10–12
23	April 26	Dodgers	3–4	Nomo	**Sauerbeck** (0–2)	Gagne	22,267	10–13
24	April 27	Dodgers	2–6	Ishii	**Suppan** (4–1)	—	19,679	10–14
25	April 29	@ Padres	7–2	**D'Amico** (2–2)	Eaton	—	15,556	11–14
26	April 30	@ Padres	8–5	**Benson** (3–3)	Perez	**Williams** (6)	13,845	12–14

May (12–16)

#	Date	Opponent	Score	Win	Loss	Save	Attendance	Record
27	May 1	@ Padres	5–2	**Wells** (1–1)	Peavy	**Williams** (7)	13,420	13–14
28	May 2	@ Dodgers	5–3	**Beimel** (1–0)	Quantrill	**Williams** (8)	53,820	14–14
29	May 3	@ Dodgers	1–4	Dreifort	**Suppan** (4–2)	Gagne	45,737	14–15
30	May 4	@ Dodgers	2–3	Brown	**D'Amico** (2–3)	Gagne	40,544	14–16
31	May 5	@ Astros	1–8	Miller	**Benson** (3–4)	—	22,765	14–17
32	May 6	@ Astros	9–10	Bland	**Sauerbeck** (0–3)	Wagner	27,023	14–18
33	May 7	@ Astros	4–13	Dotel	**Tavarez** (0–2)	—	22,706	14–19
34	May 8	@ Astros	2–6	Stone	**Suppan** (4–3)	—	28,836	14–20
35	May 9	Diamondbacks	0–5	Schilling	**D'Amico** (2–4)	—	18,080	14–21
36	May 10	Diamondbacks	5–4	**Benson** (4–4)	Dessens	**Williams** (9)	30,776	15–21
37	May 11	Diamondbacks	1–2	Batista	**Wells** (1–2)	Mantei	14,976	15–22
38	May 12	Astros	4–9	Stone	**Torres**	—	9,095	15–23
39	May 13	Astros	3–6	Munro	**Williams**	Wagner	10,535	15–24
40	May 14	Astros	3–2	**D'Amico**	Miller	**Williams** (10)	11,730	16–24
41	May 15	Astros	2–6	Oswalt	**Benson**	—	16,752	16–25
42	May 16	@ Diamondbacks	8–5 (12)	**Boehringer**	Mantei	**Williams** (11)	31,578	17–25
43	May 17	@ Diamondbacks	8–5	**Torres**	Capuano	**Williams** (12)	42,858	18–25
44	May 18	@ Diamondbacks	6–8	Webb	**Suppan** (4–4)	—	34,669	18–26
45	May 21	Cubs	5–2	**D'Amico**	Wood	**Williams** (13)	35,086	19–26
46	May 22	Cubs	2–3	Remlinger	**Sauerbeck**	Borowski	14,544	19–27
47	May 23	Cardinals	8–10 (10)	Eldred	**Meadows**	Fassero	18,660	19–28
48	May 24	Cardinals	0–6	Morris	**Suppan** (4–5)	—	35,733	19–29
49	May 25	Cardinals	8–7	**Boehringer**	Hermanson	**Williams** (14)	25,983	20–29
50	May 26	@ Cubs	10–0	**Fogg**	Wood	—	40,225	21–29
51	May 27	@ Cubs	9–4	**Benson**	Clement	—	35,961	22–29
52	May 28	@ Cubs	4–5	Prior	**D'Amico**	Borowski	32,406	22–30
53	May 30	@ Cardinals	7–3	**Suppan** (5–5)	Stephenson	—	30,599	23–30
54	May 31	@ Cardinals	4–3	**Wells**	Williams	**Williams** (15)	43,789	24–30

June (10–14)

#	Date	Opponent	Score	Win	Loss	Save	Attendance	Record
55	June 1	@ Cardinals	4–5	Kline	**Beimel**	Fassero	46,103	24–31
56	June 4	Red Sox	4–11	Kim	**Benson**	—	—	24–32
57	June 4	Red Sox	3–8	Lowe	**D'Amico**	—	27,769	24–33
58	June 5	Red Sox	5–4	**Boehringer**	Mendoza	**Williams** (16)	33,372	25–33
59	June 7	@ Braves	6–8	Hernandez	**Boehringer**	Smoltz	35,397	25–34
60	June 8	@ Braves	5–6	Hodges	**Fogg**	Smoltz	29,869	25–35
61	June 10	@ Blue Jays	8–13	Lidle	**Benson**	—	14,090	25–36
62	June 11	@ Blue Jays	5–8	Halladay	**D'Amico**	—	32,036	25–37
63	June 12	@ Blue Jays	4–5	Hendrickson	**Suppan** (5–6)	Politte	15,015	25–38
64	June 13	@ Devil Rays	1–7	Zambrano	**Wells**	—	9,487	25–39
65	June 14	@ Devil Rays	12–9	**Fogg**	Bell	**Williams** (17)	14,063	26–39
66	June 15	@ Devil Rays	9–5	**Sauerbeck**	Levine	**Williams** (18)	13,943	27–39
67	June 18	Expos	7–3	**D'Amico**	Hernandez	**Williams** (19)	—	28–39
68	June 18	Expos	4–3	**Torres**	Biddle	—	22,557	29–39
69	June 19	Expos	2–5	Ohka	**Torres**	Biddle	16,050	29–40
70	June 20	Indians	5–4 (15)	**Torres**	Baez	—	26,305	30–40
71	June 21	Indians	7–6 (15)	**Sauerbeck**	Miceli	—	36,856	31–40
72	June 22	Indians	5–8	Sabathia	**Vogelsong**	Baez	37,803	31–41
73	June 23	@ Expos	0–3	Vargas	**Suppan** (5–7)	Biddle	5,641	31–42
74	June 24	@ Expos	4–6	Ohka	**D'Amico**	Biddle	5,872	31–43
75	June 25	@ Expos	6–5	**Sauerbeck**	Eischen	**Williams** (20)	5,717	32–43
76	June 27	Rockies	5–3	**Fogg**	Jennings	**Williams** (21)	37,566	33–43
77	June 28	Rockies	4–5	Neagle	**Benson**	Jimenez	25,083	33–44
78	June 29	Rockies	9–0	**Suppan** (6–7)	Chacon	—	20,475	34–44

July (15–13)

#	Date	Opponent	Score	Win	Loss	Save	Attendance	Record
79	July 1	Reds	3–5	Graves	**Tavarez**	Williamson	17,803	34–45
80	July 2	Reds	3–4	Heredia	**Williams**	Williamson	15,322	34–46
81	July 3	Reds	8–7	**Fogg**	Dempster	**Williams** (22)	19,947	35–46
82	July 4	Astros	3–2	**Boehringer**	Munro	**Williams** (23)	30,082	36–46
83	July 5	Astros	4–3	**Suppan** (7–7)	Saarloos	**Williams** (24)	22,258	37–46
84	July 6	Astros	8–3	**D'Amico**	Miller	—	18,741	38–46
85	July 7	@ Brewers	2–9	Franklin	**Wells**	—	12,322	38–47
86	July 8	@ Brewers	8–7 (10)	**Williams**	DeJean	**Torres** (2)	12,425	39–47
87	July 9	@ Brewers	1–2 (12)	Kieschnick	**Beimel**	—	22,490	39–48
88	July 10	@ Brewers	5–4	**Suppan** (8–7)	Ford	—	21,190	40–48
89	July 11	@ Astros	2–4	Miller	**D'Amico**	Wagner	31,474	40–49
90	July 12	@ Astros	5–2	**Wells**	Oswalt	**Williams** (25)	34,762	41–49
91	July 13	@ Astros	2–5	Redding	**Fogg**	Wagner	32,273	41–50
92	July 17	Brewers	5–7	Franklin	**Benson**	Estrella	32,304	41–51
93	July 18	Brewers	7–2	**Suppan** (9–7)	Rusch	—	31,697	42–51
94	July 19	Brewers	0–1	Sheets	**D'Amico**	Kolb	24,461	42–52
95	July 20	Brewers	6–3	**Wells**	Ford	**Lincoln** (1)	22,643	43–52
96	July 21	Astros	5–3	**Fogg**	Redding	**Lincoln** (2)	14,271	44–52
97	July 22	Astros	0–2	Robertson	**Torres**	Wagner	16,661	44–53
98	July 23	@ Reds	6–5	**Boehringer**	Mercker	**Lincoln** (3)	27,629	45–53
99	July 24	@ Reds	7–5 (11)	**Lincoln**	Reitsma	—	35,504	46–53
100	July 25	@ Cardinals	10–5	**Meadows**	Eldred	—	45,296	47–53
101	July 26	@ Cardinals	8–13	Williams	**Fogg**	Isringhausen	44,249	47–54
102	July 27	@ Cardinals	3–4	Eldred	**Lincoln**	—	34,851	47–55
103	July 28	@ Cardinals	3–0	**Suppan** (10–7)	Tomko	—	33,977	48–55
104	July 29	Padres	7–8	Roa	**Lincoln**	Beck	15,201	48–56
105	July 30	Padres	7–2	**Wells**	Lawrence	**Meadows** (1)	23,709	49–56
106	July 31	Padres	7–10	Eaton	**Fogg**	Beck	18,045	49–57

August (13–15)

#	Date	Opponent	Score	Win	Loss	Save	Attendance	Record
107	August 1	Rockies	12–11	**Sanchez**	Bernero	—	22,413	50–57
108	August 2	Rockies	1–0	**Meadows**	Jennings	**Lincoln** (4)	37,820	51–57
109	August 3	Rockies	4–16	Oliver	**D'Amico**	Jimenez	16,839	51–58
110	August 5	@ Giants	0–3	Schmidt	**Wells**	Worrell	41,501	51–59
111	August 6	@ Giants	2–0	**Tavarez**	Ponson	—	41,662	52–59
112	August 7	@ Giants	5–7	Eyre	**Boehringer**	Worrell	42,334	52–60
113	August 8	@ Rockies	6–13	Jimenez	**Mahomes**	—	28,362	52–61
114	August 9	@ Rockies	10–4	**D'Amico**	Oliver	—	34,611	53–61
115	August 10	@ Rockies	5–3	**Figueroa**	Chacon	**Lincoln** (5)	26,904	54–61
116	August 11	Cardinals	4–6	Haren	**Wells**	Isringhausen	17,647	54–62
117	August 12	Cardinals	6–10	Tomko	**Fogg**	Simontacchi	21,013	54–63
118	August 13	Cardinals	6–5	**Tavarez**	Borbon	—	18,505	55–63
119	August 14	Cardinals	3–4	Stephenson	**D'Amico**	Isringhausen	16,157	55–64
120	August 15	Brewers	6–3	**Figueroa**	Kinney	**Tavarez** (1)	21,096	56–64
121	August 16	Brewers	4–6	Vizcaino	**Lincoln**	Kolb	28,143	56–65
122	August 17	Brewers	5–2	**Fogg**	Franklin	**Tavarez** (2)	24,092	57–65
123	August 19	@ Cardinals	5–13	Eldred	**Beimel**	—	28,869	57–66
124	August 20	@ Cardinals	14–0	**D'Amico**	Stephenson	—	25,741	58–66
125	August 21	@ Cardinals	3–6	Eldred	**Lincoln**	—	26,849	58–67
126	August 22	@ Brewers	2–3	Franklin	**Wells**	Kolb	22,413	58–68
127	August 23	@ Brewers	6–7	Estrella	**Corey**	—	25,432	58–69
128	August 24	@ Brewers	9–10	Kolb	**Gonzalez**	—	36,238	58–70
129	August 26	Marlins	4–3	**Lincoln**	Redman	**Tavarez** (3)	12,219	59–70
130	August 27	Marlins	4–0	**Wells**	Penny	—	18,264	60–70
131	August 28	Marlins	5–0	**Fogg**	Willis	—	12,679	61–70
132	August 29	Braves	6–5	**Tavarez**	Cunnane	—	27,415	62–70
133	August 30	Braves	6–13	Ramirez	**Perez**	—	21,323	62–71
134	August 31	Braves	4–10	Reynolds	**D'Amico**	—	23,822	62–72

September (13–15)

#	Date	Opponent	Score	Win	Loss	Save	Attendance	Record
135	September 2	@ Marlins	3–2	**Wells**	Willis	**Tavarez** (4)	10,327	63–72
136	September 3	@ Marlins	0–3	Beckett	**Fogg**	Urbina	11,135	63–73
137	September 4	@ Marlins	1–5	Tejera	**Torres**	—	10,213	63–74
138	September 5	@ Braves	2–3 (10)	Cunnane	**Corey**	—	—	63–75
139	September 5	@ Braves	5–3	**Corey**	Reynolds	**Tavarez** (5)	31,849	64–75
140	September 6	@ Braves	2–9	Maddux	**D'Amico**	—	36,932	64–76
141	September 7	@ Braves	1–2	Hampton	**Wells**	Cunnane	27,703	64–77
142	September 8	@ Reds	9–1	**Fogg**	Bale	—	19,073	65–77
143	September 9	@ Reds	6–10	Belisle	**Boehringer**	—	21,241	65–78
144	September 10	@ Reds	3–2	**Lincoln**	Reitsma	**Tavarez** (6)	20,560	66–78
145	September 11	@ Reds	2–3	Randall	**D'Amico**	Reitsma	20,479	66–79
146	September 12	Phillies	8–4	**Wells**	Telemaco	—	18,895	67–79
147	September 13	Phillies	5–3	**Fogg**	Millwood	**Tavarez** (7)	33,480	68–79
148	September 14	Phillies	7–10	Wolf	**Torres**	Williams	16,383	68–80
149	September 15	Reds	6–3	**Vogelsong**	Van Poppel	**Tavarez** (8)	8,565	69–80
150	September 16	Reds	4–12	Harang	**Perez**	Reith	11,995	69–81
151	September 17	Reds	8–5	**D'Amico**	Etherton	**Tavarez** (9)	10,625	70–81
152	September 18	Reds	7–0	**Wells**	Randall	—	10,390	71–81
153	September 19	Cubs	9–10	Veres	**Figueroa**	Borowski	—	71–82
154	September 19	Cubs	10–6	**Torres**	Cruz	—	16,248	72–82
155	September 20	Cubs	8–2	**Vogelsong**	Clement	—	32,869	73–82
156	September 21	Cubs	1–4	Prior	**Perez**	Borowski	21,497	73–83
157	September 23	@ Mets	0–1	Leiter	**Wells**	—	17,830	73–84
158	September 24	@ Mets	3–5	Trachsel	**D'Amico**	Stanton	22,134	73–85
159	September 25	@ Mets	3–1	**Torres**	Roberts	**Tavarez** (10)	25,081	74–85
160	September 27	@ Cubs	2–4	Prior	**Fogg**	Borowski	—	74–86
161	September 27	@ Cubs	2–7	Clement	**Vogelsong**	—	40,121	74–87
162	September 28	@ Cubs	3–2	**Wells**	Cruz	**Tavarez** (11)	39,940	75–87

Legend: = Win = Loss
Bold = Pirates team member

=== Record vs. opponents ===
2003 National League record Source: MLB Standings Grid – 2003
Team	AZ	ATL	CHC	CIN	COL	FLA	HOU	LAD	MIL	MON	NYM	PHI	PIT	SD	SF	STL	AL
Arizona	—	2–5	2–4	7–2	10–9	2–5	5–1	10–9	3–3	4–2	4–2	4–2	3–3	9–10	5–14	3–3	11–4
Atlanta	5–2	—	4–2	3–3	6–0	9–10	5–1	4–2	4–2	12–7	11–8	9–10	7–2	6–1	2–4	4–2	10–5
Chicago	4–2	2–4	—	10–7	3–3	4–2	9–7	2–4	10–6	3–3	5–1	1–5	10–8	4–2	4–2	8–9	9–9
Cincinnati	2–7	3–3	7–10	—	4–2	2–4	5–12	2–4	8–10	2–4	2–4	5–4	5–11	3–3	3–3	9–7	7–5
Colorado	9–10	0–6	3–3	2–4	—	4–2	2–4	7–12	5–1	3–4	2–5	2–4	3–6	12–7	7–12	4–2	9–6
Florida	5–2	10–9	2–4	4–2	2–4	—	1–5	2–5	7–2	13–6	12–7	13–6	2–4	5–1	1–5	3–3	9–6
Houston	1–5	1–5	7–9	12–5	4–2	5–1	—	4–2	9–8	3–3	2–4	2–4	10–6	3–3	2–4	11–7	11–7
Los Angeles	9–10	2–4	4–2	4–2	12–7	5–2	2–4	—	4–2	4–2	3–3	2–5	5–1	8–11	6–13	4–2	11–7
Milwaukee	3–3	2–4	6–10	10–8	1–5	2–7	8–9	2–4	—	0–6	6–3	4–2	10–7	5–1	1–5	3–13	5–7
Montreal	2–4	7–12	3–3	4–2	4–3	6–13	3–3	2–4	6–0	—	14–5	8–11	3–3	4–2	7–0	1–5	9–9
New York	2–4	8–11	1–5	4–2	5–2	7–12	4–2	3–3	3–6	5–14	—	7–12	4–2	3–3	4–2	1–5	5–10
Philadelphia	2–4	10–9	5–1	4–5	4–2	6–13	4–2	5–2	2–4	11–8	12–7	—	2–4	4–3	3–3	4–2	8–7
Pittsburgh	3–3	2–7	8–10	11–5	6–3	4–2	6–10	1–5	7–10	3–3	2–4	4–2	—	4–2	2–4	7–10	5–7
San Diego	10–9	1–6	2–4	3–3	7–12	1–5	3–3	11–8	1–5	2–4	3–3	3–4	2–4	—	5–14	2–4	8–10
San Francisco	14–5	4–2	2–4	3–3	12–7	5–1	4–2	13–6	5–1	0–7	2–4	3–3	4–2	14–5	—	5–1	10–8
St. Louis	3–3	2–4	9–8	7–9	2–4	3–3	7–11	2–4	13–3	5–1	5–1	2–4	10–7	4–2	1–5	—	10–8

=== Detailed records ===
**National League**
Opponent	W	L	WP	RS	RA
**NL East**
Atlanta Braves	2	7	0.222	37	59
Florida Marlins	4	2	0.667	17	13
Montreal Expos	3	3	0.500	23	25
New York Mets	2	4	0.333	15	20
Philadelphia Phillies	4	2	0.667	32	34
Total	15	18	0.455	124	151
**NL Central**
Chicago Cubs	8	10	0.444	82	74
Cincinnati Reds	11	5	0.688	96	72
Houston Astros	6	10	0.375	57	84
Milwaukee Brewers	7	10	0.412	74	75
St. Louis Cardinals	7	10	0.412	96	100
Total	39	45	0.464	405	405
**NL West**
Arizona Diamondbacks	3	3	0.500	28	29
Colorado Rockies	6	3	0.667	56	55
Los Angeles Dodgers	1	5	0.167	15	25
San Diego Padres	4	2	0.667	41	29
San Francisco Giants	2	4	0.333	16	19
Total	16	17	0.485	156	157
**American League**
Boston Red Sox	1	2	0.333	12	23
Cleveland Indians	2	1	0.667	17	18
Tampa Bay Devil Rays	2	1	0.667	22	21
Toronto Blue Jays	0	3	0.000	17	26
Total	5	7	0.417	68	88
Season Total	75	87	0.463	753	801

Month	Games	Won	Lost	Win %	RS	RA
March	1	1	0	1.000	10	1
April	25	11	14	0.440	91	104
May	28	12	16	0.429	126	144
June	24	10	14	0.417	124	140
July	28	15	13	0.536	135	127
August	28	13	15	0.464	147	163
September	28	13	15	0.464	120	122
Total	162	75	87	0.463	753	801

	Games	Won	Lost	Win %	RS	RA
Home	81	39	42	0.481	371	398
Away	81	36	45	0.444	382	403
Total	162	75	87	0.463	753	801

== Roster ==
2003 Pittsburgh Pirates
Roster
Pitchers: 53 Joe Beimel; 34 Kris Benson; 71 Brian Boehringer; 44 Mark Corey; 41 Jeff D'Amico; 37 Nelson Figueroa; 27 Josh Fogg; 51 Mike Gonzalez; 39 John Grabow; 57 Mike Lincoln; 39 Pat Mahomes; 48 Jim Mann; 46 Brian Meadows; 48 Óliver Pérez; 44 Dennys Reyes; 45 Duaner Sánchez; 47 Scott Sauerbeck; 37 Jeff Suppan; 50 Julián Tavárez; 31 Salomón Torres; 22 Ryan Vogelsong; 32 Kip Wells; 43 Mike Williams	Catchers: 11 Humberto Cota; 30 J. R. House; 18 Jason Kendall; Infielders: 16 José Hernández; 17 Bobby Hill; 6 Abraham Núñez; 16 Aramis Ramírez; 49 Jeff Reboulet; 3 Pokey Reese; 55 Carlos Rivera; 35 Randall Simon; 2 Jack Wilson; 29 Kevin Young	Outfielders: 38 Jason Bay; 26 J. J. Davis; 24 Brian Giles; 38 Adam Hyzdu; 7 Kenny Lofton; 59 Rob Mackowiak; 5 Tike Redman; 19 Reggie Sanders; 12 Matt Stairs; 36 Craig Wilson	Manager: 23 Lloyd McClendon; Coaches: 48,15 Rusty Kuntz (first base); 25 Pete Mackanin (bench); 28 Gerald Perry (hitting); 37 John Russell (third base); 52 Bruce Tanner (bullpen); 54 Spin Williams (pitching)

=== Opening Day lineup ===
Opening Day Starters
Name	Position
Kenny Lofton	CF
Jason Kendall	C
Brian Giles	LF
Aramis Ramírez	3B
Randall Simon	1B
Reggie Sanders	RF
Pokey Reese	2B
Jack Wilson	SS
Kris Benson	SP

== Awards and honors ==
2003 Major League Baseball All-Star Game

- Mike Williams, P, reserve

== Statistics ==
Hitting

Note: G = Games played; AB = At bats; H = Hits; Avg. = Batting average; HR = Home runs; RBI = Runs batted in

Regular season
Player	G	AB	H	Avg.	HR	RBI
J.R. House	1	1	1	1.000	0	0
B. Hill	1	3	1	0.333	0	0
T. Redman	56	230	76	0.330	3	19
J. Kendall	150	587	191	0.325	6	58
B. Giles	105	388	116	0.299	16	70
J. Suppan	20	41	12	0.293	0	2
M. Stairs	121	305	89	0.292	20	57
J. Bay	27	79	23	0.291	3	12
R. Sanders	130	453	129	0.285	31	87
A. Ramírez	96	375	105	0.280	12	67
K. Lofton	84	339	94	0.277	9	26
R. Simon	91	307	84	0.274	10	51
R. Mackowiak	77	174	47	0.270	6	19
C. Wilson	116	309	81	0.262	18	48
J. Wilson	150	558	143	0.256	9	62
H. Cota	10	16	4	0.250	0	1
P. Mahomes	9	4	1	0.250	0	0
A. Núñez	118	311	77	0.248	4	35
J. Reboulet	93	261	63	0.241	3	25
J. Hernández	58	193	43	0.223	3	21
C. Rivera	78	95	21	0.221	3	10
P. Reese	37	107	23	0.215	1	12
A. Hyzdu	51	63	13	0.206	1	8
K. Young	52	84	17	0.202	2	7
J. Davis	19	35	7	0.200	1	4
K. Wells	33	68	13	0.191	1	5
J. Fogg	25	42	8	0.190	0	1
R. Vogelsong	5	6	1	0.167	0	0
J. D'Amico	28	48	6	0.125	1	3
B. Meadows	33	14	1	0.071	0	0
S. Torres	40	32	2	0.063	0	1
J. Beimel	67	5	0	0.000	0	0
K. Benson	17	30	0	0.000	0	0
N. Figueroa	12	7	0	0.000	0	0
Ó. Pérez	5	6	0	0.000	0	0
S. Sauerbeck	50	1	0	0.000	0	0
J. Tavárez	63	4	0	0.000	0	0
B. Boehringer	60	0	0	—	0	0
M. Corey	22	0	0	—	0	0
M. Gonzalez	16	0	0	—	0	0
J. Grabow	5	0	0	—	0	0
M. Lincoln	36	0	0	—	0	0
J. Mann	2	0	0	—	0	0
D. Reyes	12	0	0	—	0	0
D. Sánchez	6	0	0	—	0	0
M. Williams	37	0	0	—	0	0
Team totals	162	5,581	1,492	0.267	163	711

Pitching

Note: G = Games pitched; IP = Innings pitched; W = Wins; L = Losses; ERA = Earned run average; SO = Strikeouts

Regular season
Player	G	IP	W	L	ERA	SO
K. Wells	31	197 1/3	10	9	3.28	147
N. Figueroa	12	35 1/3	2	1	3.31	23
J. Suppan	21	141	10	7	3.57	78
J. Grabow	5	5	0	0	3.60	9
J. Tavárez	64	83 2/3	3	3	3.66	39
S. Sauerbeck	53	40	3	4	4.05	32
B. Meadows	34	76 1/3	2	1	4.72	38
S. Torres	41	121	7	5	4.76	84
J. D'Amico	29	175 1/3	9	16	4.77	100
P. Mahomes	9	22 1/3	0	1	4.84	13
K. Benson	18	105	5	9	4.97	68
J. Beimel	69	62 1/3	1	3	5.05	42
M. Lincoln	36	36 1/3	3	4	5.20	28
J. Fogg	26	142	10	9	5.26	71
M. Corey	22	30 1/3	1	2	5.34	27
B. Boehringer	62	62 1/3	5	4	5.49	47
Ó. Pérez	5	23	0	3	5.87	24
M. Williams	40	37 1/3	1	3	6.27	20
R. Vogelsong	6	22	2	2	6.55	15
M. Gonzalez	16	8 1/3	0	1	7.56	6
D. Reyes	12	10 1/3	0	0	10.45	11
J. Mann	2	1 2/3	0	0	10.80	1
D. Sánchez	6	6	1	0	16.50	3
Team totals	162	1,444 1/3	75	87	4.64	926

== Transactions ==
- July 22, 2003: Brandon Lyon was traded by the Boston Red Sox with Anastacio Martinez to the Pittsburgh Pirates for Mike Gonzalez and Scott Sauerbeck.
- July 23, 2003: Kenny Lofton was traded by the Pittsburgh Pirates with Aramis Ramírez and cash to the Chicago Cubs for a player to be named later, Jose Hernandez, and Matt Bruback (minors). The Chicago Cubs sent Bobby Hill (August 15, 2003) to the Pittsburgh Pirates to complete the trade.
- July 31, 2003: Freddy Sanchez was traded by the Boston Red Sox with Mike Gonzalez and cash to the Pittsburgh Pirates for Brandon Lyon, Jeff Suppan, and Anastacio Martinez.
- August 17, 2003: Randall Simon was traded by the Pittsburgh Pirates to the Chicago Cubs for Ray Sadler.
- August 26, 2003: Jason Bay was traded by the San Diego Padres with a player to be named later and Óliver Pérez to the Pittsburgh Pirates for Brian Giles. The San Diego Padres sent Corey Stewart (minors) (October 2, 2003) to the Pittsburgh Pirates to complete the trade.

== Draft picks ==
2003 Top 10 Rounds Draft Picks
Rd	#	Player	Pos	DOB and Age	School
1	8	Paul Maholm	LHP	June 25, 1982 (aged 20)	Mississippi State University (Mississippi State, Mississippi)
2	45	Tom Gorzelanny	LHP	July 12, 1982 (aged 20)	University of Kansas (Lawrence, Kansas)
3	75	Steven Lerud	C	October 13, 1984 (aged 18)	Galena High School (Reno, Nevada)
4	105	Kyle Pearson	RHP	October 8, 1984 (aged 18)	A. Crawford Mosley High School (Lynn Haven, Florida)
5	135	Craig Stansberry	3B	March 8, 1982 (aged 21)	Rice University (Houston, Texas)
6	165	C.J. Smith	1B	February 22, 1982 (aged 21)	University of Florida (Gainesville, Florida)
7	195	Russ Johnson	RHP	January 6, 1973 (aged 30)	Benjamin Russell High School (Alexander City, AL)
8	225	Sergio Silva	RHP	December 22, 1981 (aged 21)	University of the Pacific (Stockton, California)
9	255	Kent Wulf	2B	April 26, 1985 (aged 18)	Quartz Hill High School (Quartz Hill, California)
10	285	John Peabody	OF	August 24, 1985 (aged 17)	Rancho Bernardo High School (San Diego, California)

Note

- Age at time of draft.

== Farm system ==
Level	Team	League	Manager
AAA	Nashville Sounds	Pacific Coast League	Trent Jewett
AA	Altoona Curve	Eastern League	Dale Sveum
A	Lynchburg Hillcats	Carolina League	Dave Clark
A	Hickory Crawdads	South Atlantic League	Tony Beasley
A-Short Season	Williamsport Crosscutters	New York–Penn League	Andy Stewart
Rookie	GCL Pirates	Gulf Coast League	Woody Huyke
Rookie	DSL Pirates	Dominican Summer League	Ramon Zapata

LEAGUE CHAMPIONS: Williamsport, DSL Pirates
