= 2003 San Francisco Giants season =

2003 San Francisco Giants
- National League West champions
- League: National League
- Division: West
- Ballpark: Pacific Bell Park
- City: San Francisco, California
- Record: 100–61 (.621)
- Divisional place: 1st
- Owners: Peter Magowan
- General managers: Brian Sabean
- Managers: Felipe Alou
- Television: KTVU (Mike Krukow, Joe Angel, Jon Miller); FSN Bay Area (Mike Krukow, Duane Kuiper)
- Radio: KNBR (Mike Krukow, Dave Flemming, Duane Kuiper, Jon Miller, Joe Angel, Dave Raymond); KZSF (Erwin Higueros, Amaury Pi-Gonzalez)

The 2003 San Francisco Giants season was the Giants' 121st season in Major League Baseball, their 46th season in San Francisco since their move from New York following the 1957 season, and their fourth season at Pacific Bell Park. The Giants entered the 2003 season as defending National League champions, aiming to get back to the World Series and win it. They finished in first place in the National League West with a record of 100 wins and 61 losses. They lost the NLDS in four games to the Florida Marlins, marking the 2003 Giants from what many described a failed season. The Giants would not return to the postseason or win the National League West until 2010.

== Offseason ==
- November 13, 2002: Felipe Alou was hired as Giants new manager, after Dusty Baker left to become the new manager of the Chicago Cubs.
- November 15, 2002: Tsuyoshi Shinjo was released by the San Francisco Giants.
- December 7, 2002: Marquis Grissom signed as a free agent with the San Francisco Giants.
- December 7, 2002: Ray Durham was signed as a free agent with the San Francisco Giants.
- March 18, 2003: Clay Bellinger was signed as a free agent with the San Francisco Giants.

== Regular season ==
The Giants only played 161 games. The Giants elected to not make up one game (at New York Mets) that was postponed due to the Northeast blackout of 2003. Had the Giants made up the game and won, the Giants would've been assured home-field advantage in a potential NLCS meeting with the Atlanta Braves due to the Giants winning the season series if both teams held identical records of 101–61. No Division Series matchups would've been altered due to the Marlins and Braves being restricted from meeting in the Division Series as both teams are from the NL East.

Ray Durham and Benito Santiago became the first pair of Giants teammates to homer in each of the team's first two games of a season since at least 1901.

On June 23 against the Los Angeles Dodgers, Barry Bonds stole second in the 11th inning, the 500th steal of his career. He became the first major leaguer to collect 500 home runs and 500 stolen bases in a career.

=== Opening day starters ===
- J.T. Snow
- Ray Durham
- Rich Aurilia
- Edgardo Alfonzo
- Barry Bonds
- Marquis Grissom
- Jose Cruz Jr.
- Benito Santiago
- Kirk Rueter

=== Season standings ===
==== National League West ====
NL West
Team	W	L	Pct.	GB	Home	Road
San Francisco Giants	100	61	.621	—	57‍–‍24	43‍–‍37
Los Angeles Dodgers	85	77	.525	15½	46‍–‍35	39‍–‍42
Arizona Diamondbacks	84	78	.519	16½	45‍–‍36	39‍–‍42
Colorado Rockies	74	88	.457	26½	49‍–‍32	25‍–‍56
San Diego Padres	64	98	.395	36½	35‍–‍46	29‍–‍52

==== Record vs. opponents ====
2003 National League record Source: MLB Standings Grid – 2003
Team	AZ	ATL	CHC	CIN	COL	FLA	HOU	LAD	MIL	MON	NYM	PHI	PIT	SD	SF	STL	AL
Arizona	—	2–5	2–4	7–2	10–9	2–5	5–1	10–9	3–3	4–2	4–2	4–2	3–3	9–10	5–14	3–3	11–4
Atlanta	5–2	—	4–2	3–3	6–0	9–10	5–1	4–2	4–2	12–7	11–8	9–10	7–2	6–1	2–4	4–2	10–5
Chicago	4–2	2–4	—	10–7	3–3	4–2	9–7	2–4	10–6	3–3	5–1	1–5	10–8	4–2	4–2	8–9	9–9
Cincinnati	2–7	3–3	7–10	—	4–2	2–4	5–12	2–4	8–10	2–4	2–4	5–4	5–11	3–3	3–3	9–7	7–5
Colorado	9–10	0–6	3–3	2–4	—	4–2	2–4	7–12	5–1	3–4	2–5	2–4	3–6	12–7	7–12	4–2	9–6
Florida	5–2	10–9	2–4	4–2	2–4	—	1–5	2–5	7–2	13–6	12–7	13–6	2–4	5–1	1–5	3–3	9–6
Houston	1–5	1–5	7–9	12–5	4–2	5–1	—	4–2	9–8	3–3	2–4	2–4	10–6	3–3	2–4	11–7	11–7
Los Angeles	9–10	2–4	4–2	4–2	12–7	5–2	2–4	—	4–2	4–2	3–3	2–5	5–1	8–11	6–13	4–2	11–7
Milwaukee	3–3	2–4	6–10	10–8	1–5	2–7	8–9	2–4	—	0–6	6–3	4–2	10–7	5–1	1–5	3–13	5–7
Montreal	2–4	7–12	3–3	4–2	4–3	6–13	3–3	2–4	6–0	—	14–5	8–11	3–3	4–2	7–0	1–5	9–9
New York	2–4	8–11	1–5	4–2	5–2	7–12	4–2	3–3	3–6	5–14	—	7–12	4–2	3–3	4–2	1–5	5–10
Philadelphia	2–4	10–9	5–1	4–5	4–2	6–13	4–2	5–2	2–4	11–8	12–7	—	2–4	4–3	3–3	4–2	8–7
Pittsburgh	3–3	2–7	8–10	11–5	6–3	4–2	6–10	1–5	7–10	3–3	2–4	4–2	—	4–2	2–4	7–10	5–7
San Diego	10–9	1–6	2–4	3–3	7–12	1–5	3–3	11–8	1–5	2–4	3–3	3–4	2–4	—	5–14	2–4	8–10
San Francisco	14–5	4–2	2–4	3–3	12–7	5–1	4–2	13–6	5–1	0–7	2–4	3–3	4–2	14–5	—	5–1	10–8
St. Louis	3–3	2–4	9–8	7–9	2–4	3–3	7–11	2–4	13–3	5–1	5–1	2–4	10–7	4–2	1–5	—	10–8

=== Roster ===
2003 San Francisco Giants
Roster
Pitchers: 32 Kurt Ainsworth; 16 Manny Aybar; 38 Jim Brower; 40 Jason Christiansen; 50,53 Kevin Correia; 49 Scott Eyre; 34 Jesse Foppert; 48 Matt Herges; 32 Dustin Hermanson; 43 Ryan Jensen; 60 Noah Lowry; 28 Damian Moss; 36 Joe Nathan; 43 Sidney Ponson; 51 Brian Powell; 47 Félix Rodríguez; 46 Kirk Rueter; 29 Jason Schmidt; 57 Jerome Williams; 45 Tim Worrell; 41 Chad Zerbe	Catchers: 50,37 Alberto Castillo; 52 Trey Lunsford; 33 Benito Santiago; 8 Yorvit Torrealba; Infielders: 13 Edgardo Alfonzo; 35 Rich Aurilia; 5 Ray Durham; 39 Pedro Feliz; 14 Andrés Galarraga; 28 Lance Niekro; 1 Neifi Pérez; 2 Cody Ransom; 6 J. T. Snow; 21 Eric Young	Outfielders: 25 Barry Bonds; 22 José Cruz Jr.; 56 Jason Ellison; 9 Marquis Grissom; 16 Jeffrey Hammonds; 50 Todd Linden; 21 Rubén Rivera; 16 Francisco Santos; 20 Tony Torcato; 21 Carlos Valderrama; Other batters: 7 Marvin Benard	Manager: 23 Felipe Alou; Coaches: 26 Mark Gardner (bullpen); 15 Gene Glynn (third base); 18 Joe Lefebvre (hitting); 55 Luis Pujols (first base); 19 Dave Righetti (pitching); 10 Ron Wotus (bench)

== Player stats ==
=== Batting ===
==== Starters by position ====
Note: Pos = Position; G = Games played; AB = At bats; H = Hits; Avg. = Batting average; HR = Home runs; RBI = Runs batted in

Pos	Player	G	AB	H	Avg.	HR	RBI
C	Benito Santiago	108	401	112	.279	11	56
1B	J.T. Snow	103	330	90	.273	8	51
2B	Ray Durham	110	410	117	.285	8	33
SS	Rich Aurilia	129	505	140	.277	13	58
3B	Edgardo Alfonzo	142	514	133	.259	13	81
LF	Barry Bonds	130	390	133	.341	45	90
CF	Marquis Grissom	149	587	176	.300	20	79
RF	José Cruz Jr.	158	539	135	.250	20	68

==== Other batters ====
Note: G = Games played; AB = At bats; H = Hits; Avg. = Batting average; HR = Home runs; RBI = Runs batted in

Player	G	AB	H	Avg.	HR	RBI
Neifi Pérez	120	328	84	.256	1	31
Andrés Galarraga	110	272	82	.301	12	42
Pedro Feliz	95	235	58	.247	16	48
Yorvit Torrealba	66	200	52	.260	4	29
Jeffrey Hammonds	36	94	26	.277	3	10
Eric Young	26	71	14	.197	0	3
Marvin Benard	46	71	14	.197	0	4
Rubén Rivera	31	50	9	.180	2	4
Todd Linden	18	38	8	.211	1	6
Cody Ransom	20	27	6	.222	1	1
Tony Torcato	14	16	3	.188	0	1
Alberto Castillo	11	15	3	.200	1	4
Francisco Santos	8	15	3	.200	1	1
Jason Ellison	7	10	1	.100	0	0
Carlos Valderrama	7	7	1	.143	0	0
Lance Niekro	5	5	1	.200	0	2
Trey Lunsford	1	1	0	.000	0	0

=== Pitching ===
==== Starting pitchers ====
Note: G = Games pitched; IP = Innings pitched; W = Wins; L = Losses; ERA = Earned run average; SO = Strikeouts

Player	G	IP	W	L	ERA	SO
Jason Schmidt	29	207.2	17	5	2.34	208
Kirk Rueter	27	147.0	10	5	4.53	41
Jerome Williams	21	131.0	7	5	3.30	88
Damian Moss	21	115.0	9	7	4.70	57
Jesse Foppert	23	111.0	8	9	5.03	101
Sidney Ponson	10	68.0	3	6	3.71	34
Kurt Ainsworth	11	66.0	5	4	3.82	48
Brian Powell	1	4.2	0	1	13.50	3

==== Other pitchers ====
Note: G = Games pitched; IP = Innings pitched; W = Wins; L = Losses; ERA = Earned run average; SO = Strikeouts

Player	G	IP	W	L	ERA	SO
Jim Brower	51	100.0	8	5	3.96	65
Kevin Correia	10	39.1	3	1	3.66	28
Dustin Hermanson	9	39.0	2	1	3.00	27
Ryan Jensen	6	13.1	0	0	10.80	3

==== Relief pitchers ====
Note: G = Games pitched; W = Wins; L = Losses; SV = Saves; ERA = Earned run average; SO = Strikeouts

Player	G	W	L	SV	ERA	SO
Tim Worrell	76	4	4	38	2.87	65
Joe Nathan	78	12	4	0	2.96	83
Scott Eyre	74	2	1	1	3.32	35
Félix Rodríguez	68	8	2	2	3.10	46
Jason Christiansen	40	0	0	0	5.19	22
Chad Zerbe	33	1	1	0	4.71	17
Matt Herges	27	1	0	0	2.31	28
Noah Lowry	4	0	0	0	0.00	5
Manny Aybar	3	0	0	0	6.00	2

== 2003 National League Division Series ==
The Giants lost to the Florida Marlins in the NLDS.

Game 1 – Florida 0, San Francisco 2
Game 2 – Florida 9, San Francisco 5
Game 3 – San Francisco 3, Florida 4
Game 4 – San Francisco 6, Florida 7

This was the last playoff series that the Giants lost before winning 11 straight, a streak that ended in the 2016 Division Series against the Chicago Cubs.

== Awards and honors ==
- Barry Bonds, National League Most Valuable Player
- Marquis Grissom CF, Willie Mac Award

All-Star Game

- Barry Bonds
- Jason Schmidt

== Farm system ==
Level	Team	League	Manager
AAA	Fresno Grizzlies	Pacific Coast League	Fred Stanley
AA	Norwich Navigators	Eastern League	Shane Turner
A	San Jose Giants	California League	Jack Lind
A	Hagerstown Suns	South Atlantic League	Mike Ramsey
A-Short Season	Salem-Keizer Volcanoes	Northwest League	Joe Strain
Rookie	AZL Giants	Arizona League	Bert Hunter
