= 2003 San Diego Padres season =

2003 San Diego Padres
- League: National League
- Division: West
- Ballpark: Qualcomm Stadium
- City: San Diego, California
- Record: 64–98 (.395)
- Divisional place: 5th
- Owners: John Moores
- General managers: Kevin Towers
- Managers: Bruce Bochy
- Television: KUSI-TV; 4SD (Mark Grant, Matt Vasgersian, Rick Sutcliffe)
- Radio: KOGO (Jerry Coleman, Ted Leitner); KURS (Rene Mora, Juan Avila, Eduardo Ortega)

The 2003 San Diego Padres season was the 35th season in franchise history. The team was managed by Bruce Bochy, as the team played their final season of home games at Qualcomm Stadium before moving the club to Petco Park the following season.

== Offseason ==
- November 19, 2002: Jesse Orosco signed as a free agent with the San Diego Padres.
- December 10, 2002: Jaret Wright signed as a free agent with the San Diego Padres.

== Regular season ==
=== Opening Day starters ===
- Gary Bennett
- Sean Burroughs
- Ryan Klesko
- Mark Kotsay
- Brian Lawrence
- Mark Loretta
- Xavier Nady
- Ramón Vázquez
- Rondell White

=== Notable transactions ===
- June 3, 2003: Tim Stauffer was drafted by the San Diego Padres in the 1st round (4th pick) of the 2003 amateur draft. Player signed August 9, 2003.
- June 3, 2003: Dirk Hayhurst was drafted by the San Diego Padres in the 8th round of the 2003 amateur draft. Player signed June 10, 2003.
- July 22, 2003: Jesse Orosco was sent to the New York Yankees by the San Diego Padres as part of a conditional deal.
- August 12, 2003: Jason Bay was traded by the San Diego Padres with a player to be named later and Óliver Pérez to the Pittsburgh Pirates for Brian Giles. The San Diego Padres sent Corey Stewart (minors) (October 2, 2003) to the Pittsburgh Pirates to complete the trade.
- August 15, 2003: Jaret Wright was selected off waivers by the Atlanta Braves from the San Diego Padres.

=== Season standings ===
==== National League West ====
NL West
Team	W	L	Pct.	GB	Home	Road
San Francisco Giants	100	61	.621	—	57‍–‍24	43‍–‍37
Los Angeles Dodgers	85	77	.525	15½	46‍–‍35	39‍–‍42
Arizona Diamondbacks	84	78	.519	16½	45‍–‍36	39‍–‍42
Colorado Rockies	74	88	.457	26½	49‍–‍32	25‍–‍56
San Diego Padres	64	98	.395	36½	35‍–‍46	29‍–‍52

==== Record vs. opponents ====
2003 National League record Source: MLB Standings Grid – 2003
Team	AZ	ATL	CHC	CIN	COL	FLA	HOU	LAD	MIL	MON	NYM	PHI	PIT	SD	SF	STL	AL
Arizona	—	2–5	2–4	7–2	10–9	2–5	5–1	10–9	3–3	4–2	4–2	4–2	3–3	9–10	5–14	3–3	11–4
Atlanta	5–2	—	4–2	3–3	6–0	9–10	5–1	4–2	4–2	12–7	11–8	9–10	7–2	6–1	2–4	4–2	10–5
Chicago	4–2	2–4	—	10–7	3–3	4–2	9–7	2–4	10–6	3–3	5–1	1–5	10–8	4–2	4–2	8–9	9–9
Cincinnati	2–7	3–3	7–10	—	4–2	2–4	5–12	2–4	8–10	2–4	2–4	5–4	5–11	3–3	3–3	9–7	7–5
Colorado	9–10	0–6	3–3	2–4	—	4–2	2–4	7–12	5–1	3–4	2–5	2–4	3–6	12–7	7–12	4–2	9–6
Florida	5–2	10–9	2–4	4–2	2–4	—	1–5	2–5	7–2	13–6	12–7	13–6	2–4	5–1	1–5	3–3	9–6
Houston	1–5	1–5	7–9	12–5	4–2	5–1	—	4–2	9–8	3–3	2–4	2–4	10–6	3–3	2–4	11–7	11–7
Los Angeles	9–10	2–4	4–2	4–2	12–7	5–2	2–4	—	4–2	4–2	3–3	2–5	5–1	8–11	6–13	4–2	11–7
Milwaukee	3–3	2–4	6–10	10–8	1–5	2–7	8–9	2–4	—	0–6	6–3	4–2	10–7	5–1	1–5	3–13	5–7
Montreal	2–4	7–12	3–3	4–2	4–3	6–13	3–3	2–4	6–0	—	14–5	8–11	3–3	4–2	7–0	1–5	9–9
New York	2–4	8–11	1–5	4–2	5–2	7–12	4–2	3–3	3–6	5–14	—	7–12	4–2	3–3	4–2	1–5	5–10
Philadelphia	2–4	10–9	5–1	4–5	4–2	6–13	4–2	5–2	2–4	11–8	12–7	—	2–4	4–3	3–3	4–2	8–7
Pittsburgh	3–3	2–7	8–10	11–5	6–3	4–2	6–10	1–5	7–10	3–3	2–4	4–2	—	4–2	2–4	7–10	5–7
San Diego	10–9	1–6	2–4	3–3	7–12	1–5	3–3	11–8	1–5	2–4	3–3	3–4	2–4	—	5–14	2–4	8–10
San Francisco	14–5	4–2	2–4	3–3	12–7	5–1	4–2	13–6	5–1	0–7	2–4	3–3	4–2	14–5	—	5–1	10–8
St. Louis	3–3	2–4	9–8	7–9	2–4	3–3	7–11	2–4	13–3	5–1	5–1	2–4	10–7	4–2	1–5	—	10–8

=== Roster ===
2003 San Diego Padres
Roster
Pitchers: 45 Rod Beck; 54 Mike Bynum; 41 Clay Condrey; 58 Roger Deago; 53 Adam Eaton; 58,16 Luther Hackman; 52 Matt Herges; 51 Trevor Hoffman; 39 Ben Howard; 32 Kevin Jarvis; 57 Randy Keisler; 50 Brian Lawrence; 38 Scott Linebrink; 37 Carlton Loewer; 49 Mike Matthews; 39 Charles Nagy; 47 Jesse Orosco; 44 Jake Peavy; 59 Óliver Pérez; 37 Joe Roa; 45 Dennis Tankersley; 55 Brian Tollberg; 43 Brandon Villafuerte; 55 Kevin Walker; 46 Jay Witasick; 21 Jaret Wright	Catchers: 29 Gary Bennett; 7 Wiki González; 20 Miguel Ojeda; 11 Humberto Quintero; 10 Mike Rivera; Infielders: 33 Sean Burroughs; 3 Khalil Greene; 25 Dave Hansen; 30 Ryan Klesko; 18 Keith Lockhart; 8 Mark Loretta; 17 Donaldo Méndez; 28 Lou Merloni; 23 Phil Nevin; 9 Todd Sears; 1 Ramón Vázquez	Outfielders: 2 Jason Bay; 34 Brian Buchanan; 17 Jermaine Clark; 24 Brian Giles; 14 Mark Kotsay; 13 Gary Matthews, Jr.; 22 Xavier Nady; 3 Shane Victorino; 27 Rondell White	Manager: 15 Bruce Bochy; Coaches: 48 Darrel Akerfelds (bullpen); 36 Darren Balsley (pitching, May 17-); 38 Greg Booker (pitching, beginning of season-May 16); 24,27 Davey Lopes (first base); 12 Dave Magadan (hitting); 40 Tony Muser (bench); 5 Rob Picciolo (third base)

== Player stats ==
=== Batting ===
==== Starters by position ====
Note: Pos = Position: G = Games played; AB = At bats; H = Hits; Avg. = Batting average; HR = Home runs; RBI = Runs batted in

Pos	Player	G	AB	H	Avg.	HR	RBI
C	Gary Bennett	96	307	73	.238	2	42
1B	Ryan Klesko	121	397	100	.252	21	67
2B	Mark Loretta	154	589	185	.314	13	72
SS	Ramón Vázquez	116	422	110	.261	3	30
3B	Sean Burroughs	146	517	148	.286	7	58
LF	Rondell White	115	413	115	.278	18	66
CF	Mark Kotsay	128	482	128	.266	7	38
RF	Xavier Nady	110	371	99	.267	9	39

==== Other batters ====
Note: G = Games played; AB = At bats; H = Hits; Avg. = Batting average; HR = Home runs; RBI = Runs batted in

Player	G	AB	H	Avg.	HR	RBI
Gary Matthews Jr.	103	306	83	.271	4	22
Phil Nevin	59	226	63	.279	13	46
Brian Buchanan	115	198	52	.263	8	29
Lou Merloni	65	151	41	.272	1	17
Miguel Ojeda	61	141	33	.234	4	22
Dave Hansen	110	135	33	.244	2	15
Brian Giles	29	104	31	.298	4	18
Keith Lockhart	62	95	23	.242	3	8
Donaldo Méndez	26	84	19	.226	2	9
Shane Victorino	36	73	11	.151	0	4
Wiki González	24	65	13	.200	0	10
Khalil Greene	20	65	14	.215	2	6
Mike Rivera	19	53	9	.170	1	2
Humberto Quintero	12	23	5	.217	0	2
Jason Bay	3	8	2	.250	1	2
Todd Sears	9	8	2	.250	0	0
Jermaine Clark	1	2	0	.000	0	1

=== Pitching ===
==== Starting pitchers ====
Note: G = Games pitched; IP = Innings pitched; W = Wins; L = Losses; ERA = Earned run average; SO = Strikeouts

Player	G	IP	W	L	ERA	SO
Brian Lawrence	33	210.2	10	15	4.19	116
Jake Peavy	32	194.2	12	11	4.11	156
Adam Eaton	31	183.0	9	12	4.08	146
Óliver Pérez	19	103.2	4	7	5.38	117
Kevin Jarvis	16	92.0	4	8	5.87	49
Ben Howard	6	34.2	1	3	3.63	24
Carlton Loewer	5	21.2	1	2	6.65	11
Brian Tollberg	3	10.1	0	2	6.97	2
Roger Deago	2	10.1	0	1	7.84	10
Randy Keisler	2	6.0	0	1	12.00	5
Dennis Tankersley	1	0.0	0	1	inf	0

==== Other pitchers ====
Note: G = Games pitched; IP = Innings pitched; W = Wins; L = Losses; ERA = Earned run average; SO = Strikeouts

Player	G	IP	W	L	ERA	SO
Mike Bynum	13	36.0	1	4	8.75	35
Clay Condrey	9	34.0	1	2	8.47	25

===== Relief pitchers =====
Note: G = Games pitched; W = Wins; L = Losses; SV = Saves; ERA = Earned run average; SO = Strikeouts

Player	G	W	L	SV	ERA	SO
Rod Beck	36	3	2	20	1.78	32
Mike Matthews	77	6	4	0	4.45	44
Luther Hackman	65	2	2	0	5.17	48
Jay Witasick	46	3	7	2	4.53	42
Scott Linebrink	43	2	1	0	2.82	51
Jesse Orosco	42	1	1	2	7.56	22
Matt Herges	40	2	2	3	2.86	40
Jaret Wright	39	1	5	2	8.37	41
Brandon Villafuerte	31	0	2	2	4.20	34
Joe Roa	18	1	1	0	6.75	18
Kevin Walker	11	0	0	0	5.40	5
Trevor Hoffman	9	0	0	0	2.00	11
Charles Nagy	5	0	2	0	4.38	7
Wiki González	1	0	0	0	0.00	0

== Award winners ==
2003 Major League Baseball All-Star Game

- Rondell White

== Farm system ==
Level	Team	League	Manager
AAA	Portland Beavers	Pacific Coast League	Rick Sweet
AA	Mobile BayBears	Southern League	Craig Colbert
A	Lake Elsinore Storm	California League	Jeff Gardner
A	Fort Wayne Wizards	Midwest League	Gary Jones
A-Short Season	Eugene Emeralds	Northwest League	Roy Howell
Rookie	Idaho Falls Padres	Pioneer League	Carlos Lezcano
