= Roger Deago =

Panamanian baseball player (born 1977)

- Pitcher
- Born: June 21, 1977 (age 49); Monagrillo, Panama
- Batted: Right Threw: Right

MLB debut
- May 10, 2003, for the San Diego Padres

Last MLB appearance
- May 15, 2003, for the San Diego Padres

MLB statistics
- Win–loss record: 0–1
- Earned run average: 7.84
- Strikeouts: 10
- Stats at Baseball Reference

Teams
- San Diego Padres (2003)
Medals
Men's baseball
Representing Panama
Bolivarian Games
| Gold medal – first place | 2001 Guayaquil | Team |
Central American and Caribbean Games
| Silver medal – second place | 2002 San Salvador | Team |

Roger I. Villarreal Deago (born June 21, 1977) is a Panamanian baseball player who last played professionally in 2008. He played in Major League Baseball for the San Diego Padres in 2003, and has also played in numerous international baseball events as well.

== Professional baseball ==
Deago played for Technika Brno in Brno, Czech Republic before signing as an amateur free agent by the Padres in 2002, and in 2003 he made his Major League debut. He spent most of the 2003 season with the Mobile BayBears, going 8–7 with a 4.03 ERA in 26 games (20 starts) with them. On May 10, 2003, he made his big league debut against the New York Mets. He pitched well in his first big league game, allowing two runs on five hits and three walks in six innings of work, coming away with a no-decision. He pitched poorly against the Atlanta Braves in his next start on May 15, allowing seven earned runs in 4 1/3 innings of work. That would be the final game of his big league career. Overall, he went 0–1 with a 7.84 ERA in his big league career.

Although Deago's big league career was over after only two games, he continued to play professionally for several years. In 2004, he pitched for the Lake Elsinore Storm, BayBears and Portland Beavers, going a combined 3–2 with a 2.00 ERA in 20 games (eight starts). He pitched for the BayBears and Beavers in 2005, going a combined 1–2 with a 5.40 ERA in five starts. For the BayBears and Beavers in 2006, Deago went a combined 10–8 with a 4.49 ERA in 28 games (21 starts). He played for the Beavers and San Antonio Missions in 2007, going a combined 6–8 with a 5.13 ERA in 35 games (21 starts). He ended up in the Tampa Bay Rays organization in 2008, and he pitched for their Double-A team, the Montgomery Biscuits. That season, he went 2–5 with a 2.95 ERA in 59 relief appearances.

In 2011, Deago returned to the Czech Republic to play for Technika Brno.

== International competition ==
In the 2001 Baseball World Cup, Deago was 1–1 with a 4.08 ERA. He went 2–0 with 19 strikeouts and a 1.29 ERA in 14 innings of work in the 2002 Intercontinental Cup. During the Confederación Panamericana de Béisbol qualifiers for the 2008 Olympics, Deago allowed three runs in 11 innings - however, Panama failed to advance to the Olympics. He appeared in two games in the 2006 World Baseball Classic, pitching 1 1/3 innings and allowing three hits and two runs (neither of them were earned). He posted a 0.00 ERA.
