= Francisco Santos (baseball) =

Dominican baseball player (born 1974)

- Outfielder
- Born: March 9, 1974 (age 52); Santo Domingo, Dominican Republic
- Batted: Left Threw: Left

MLB debut
- June 18, 2003, for the San Francisco Giants

Last MLB appearance
- July 3, 2003, for the San Francisco Giants

MLB statistics
- Batting average: .200
- Home runs: 1
- Runs batted in: 1
- Stats at Baseball Reference

Teams
- San Francisco Giants (2003)

Francisco Alejandro Santos Carmona (born March 9, 1974) is a Dominican former Major League Baseball (MLB) outfielder who played for the San Francisco Giants in 2003.

He played for six seasons in the minor leagues. During the 2001 season with the Hagerstown Suns, he was selected for the South Atlantic League All-Star Game. During this season, he had personal season highs in the areas of plate appearances, at bats, runs, home runs, runs batted in, stolen bases and bases on balls. At the time he was known as a 20-year-old 1st baseman, Deivis Santos. However, it was revealed in 2003 that Santos' first name was in fact named Francisco and that he was 29 years old. Therefore, when he had his All Star season in Hagerstown he was in fact 27 years old. He played his final professional season in 2005 with the Newark Bears of the independent Atlantic League.
