= Carlos Valderrama (baseball) =

Venezuelan baseball player (born 1977)

- Outfielder
- Born: November 30, 1977 (age 48); Maracaibo, Zulia, Venezuela
- Batted: Right Threw: Right

MLB debut
- June 21, 2003, for the San Francisco Giants

Last MLB appearance
- June 29, 2003, for the San Francisco Giants

MLB statistics
- Batting average: .143
- Hits: 1
- Stolen bases: 1
- Stats at Baseball Reference

Teams
- San Francisco Giants (2003)

Carlos Alberto Valderrama Cordero (born November 30, 1977) is a Venezuelan former outfielder in Major League Baseball who appeared in seven games for the San Francisco Giants during the 2003 season.

== Career ==
Born in Maracaibo, Zulia and listed at 6 feet (1.83 m) and 180 pounds (81.7 kg), Valderrama played nine seasons in Minor League Baseball (MiLB). He has a minor league career .298 average with 57 home runs, 334 runs batted in, 427 runs, and 203 stolen bases.

Valderrama is the former manager of the Augusta GreenJackets, the Low-A East affiliate of the Atlanta Braves. He is currently the manager of the Eugene Emeralds, the High-A West affiliate of the San Francisco Giants.

== See also ==
- List of Major League Baseball players from Venezuela

== Sources ==
- Career statistics from ESPN · Baseball Reference · Baseball Reference (Minors) · Retrosheet · Baseball Almanac, or Retrosheet
