= 2003 Los Angeles Dodgers season =

2003 Los Angeles Dodgers
- League: National League
- Division: West
- Ballpark: Dodger Stadium
- City: Los Angeles
- Record: 85–77 (.525)
- Divisional place: 2nd
- Owners: Fox Entertainment Group
- President: Bob Graziano
- General managers: Dan Evans
- Managers: Jim Tracy
- Television: Fox Sports Net West 2 KCOP (13)
- Radio: KFWB; Vin Scully, Ross Porter, Rick Monday; KWKW; Jaime Jarrín, Pepe Yñiguez, Fernando Valenzuela

The 2003 Los Angeles Dodgers season was the 114th for the franchise in Major League Baseball, and their 46th season in Los Angeles, California. It was a turbulent season as Fox Entertainment Group was seeking to sell the team. Nevertheless, the Dodgers fell just short of a Wild Card berth, winning 85 games while finishing second in the National League West. The Dodgers pitching staff led baseball in earned run average (3.16), Éric Gagné became the first Dodger to earn the NL Cy Young Award since 1988 as he converted all 55 of his save opportunities. Shawn Green set a new Dodgers single season record with 49 doubles and Paul Lo Duca had a 25-game hitting streak.

== Offseason ==
- December 4, 2002: Acquired Todd Hundley and Chad Hermansen from the Chicago Cubs for Mark Grudzielanek and Eric Karros.
- December 16, 2002: Acquired Derek Thompson from the Chicago Cubs for cash.
- January 25, 2003: Acquired Daryle Ward from the Houston Astros for Ruddy Lugo.
- January 27, 2003: Acquired Jason Romano from the Colorado Rockies for Luke Allen.
- January 30, 2003: Ron Coomer was signed as a free agent.

== Regular season ==
=== Season standings ===
==== National League West ====
NL West
Team	W	L	Pct.	GB	Home	Road
San Francisco Giants	100	61	.621	—	57‍–‍24	43‍–‍37
Los Angeles Dodgers	85	77	.525	15½	46‍–‍35	39‍–‍42
Arizona Diamondbacks	84	78	.519	16½	45‍–‍36	39‍–‍42
Colorado Rockies	74	88	.457	26½	49‍–‍32	25‍–‍56
San Diego Padres	64	98	.395	36½	35‍–‍46	29‍–‍52

==== Record vs. opponents ====
2003 National League record Source: MLB Standings Grid – 2003
Team	AZ	ATL	CHC	CIN	COL	FLA	HOU	LAD	MIL	MON	NYM	PHI	PIT	SD	SF	STL	AL
Arizona	—	2–5	2–4	7–2	10–9	2–5	5–1	10–9	3–3	4–2	4–2	4–2	3–3	9–10	5–14	3–3	11–4
Atlanta	5–2	—	4–2	3–3	6–0	9–10	5–1	4–2	4–2	12–7	11–8	9–10	7–2	6–1	2–4	4–2	10–5
Chicago	4–2	2–4	—	10–7	3–3	4–2	9–7	2–4	10–6	3–3	5–1	1–5	10–8	4–2	4–2	8–9	9–9
Cincinnati	2–7	3–3	7–10	—	4–2	2–4	5–12	2–4	8–10	2–4	2–4	5–4	5–11	3–3	3–3	9–7	7–5
Colorado	9–10	0–6	3–3	2–4	—	4–2	2–4	7–12	5–1	3–4	2–5	2–4	3–6	12–7	7–12	4–2	9–6
Florida	5–2	10–9	2–4	4–2	2–4	—	1–5	2–5	7–2	13–6	12–7	13–6	2–4	5–1	1–5	3–3	9–6
Houston	1–5	1–5	7–9	12–5	4–2	5–1	—	4–2	9–8	3–3	2–4	2–4	10–6	3–3	2–4	11–7	11–7
Los Angeles	9–10	2–4	4–2	4–2	12–7	5–2	2–4	—	4–2	4–2	3–3	2–5	5–1	8–11	6–13	4–2	11–7
Milwaukee	3–3	2–4	6–10	10–8	1–5	2–7	8–9	2–4	—	0–6	6–3	4–2	10–7	5–1	1–5	3–13	5–7
Montreal	2–4	7–12	3–3	4–2	4–3	6–13	3–3	2–4	6–0	—	14–5	8–11	3–3	4–2	7–0	1–5	9–9
New York	2–4	8–11	1–5	4–2	5–2	7–12	4–2	3–3	3–6	5–14	—	7–12	4–2	3–3	4–2	1–5	5–10
Philadelphia	2–4	10–9	5–1	4–5	4–2	6–13	4–2	5–2	2–4	11–8	12–7	—	2–4	4–3	3–3	4–2	8–7
Pittsburgh	3–3	2–7	8–10	11–5	6–3	4–2	6–10	1–5	7–10	3–3	2–4	4–2	—	4–2	2–4	7–10	5–7
San Diego	10–9	1–6	2–4	3–3	7–12	1–5	3–3	11–8	1–5	2–4	3–3	3–4	2–4	—	5–14	2–4	8–10
San Francisco	14–5	4–2	2–4	3–3	12–7	5–1	4–2	13–6	5–1	0–7	2–4	3–3	4–2	14–5	—	5–1	10–8
St. Louis	3–3	2–4	9–8	7–9	2–4	3–3	7–11	2–4	13–3	5–1	5–1	2–4	10–7	4–2	1–5	—	10–8

=== Opening Day lineup ===
Opening Day starters
Name	Position
Dave Roberts	Center fielder
Paul Lo Duca	Catcher
Shawn Green	Right fielder
Brian Jordan	Left fielder
Fred McGriff	First baseman
Adrián Beltré	Third baseman
Jolbert Cabrera	Second baseman
César Izturis	Shortstop
Hideo Nomo	Starting pitcher

=== Notable transactions ===
- July 14, 2003: Acquired Jeromy Burnitz from the New York Mets for Jose S. Diaz, Victor Diaz and Kole Strayhorn
- July 31, 2003: Acquired Robin Ventura from the New York Yankees for Bubba Crosby and Scott Proctor

=== Roster ===
2003 Los Angeles Dodgers
Roster
Pitchers: 57 Víctor Alvarez; 47 Wilson Álvarez; 43 Andy Ashby; 27 Kevin Brown; 54 Troy Brohawn; 50 Steve Colyer; 37 Darren Dreifort; 38 Éric Gagné; 17 Kazuhisa Ishii; 36 Edwin Jackson; 60 Masao Kida; 51 Tom Martin; 59 Guillermo Mota; 49 Scott Mullen; 58 Rodney Myers; 10 Hideo Nomo; 45 Odalis Pérez; 46 Paul Quantrill; 44 Paul Shuey	Catchers: 9 Todd Hundley; 16 Paul Lo Duca; 40 David Ross; Infielders: 29 Adrián Beltré; 8 Ron Coomer; 13 Alex Cora; 28 Fred McGriff; 3 César Izturis; 49 Joe Thurston; 23 Robin Ventura	Outfielders: 21 Jeromy Burnitz; 6 Jolbert Cabrera; 49 Bubba Crosby; 15 Shawn Green; 25 Rickey Henderson; 41 Chad Hermansen; 33 Brian Jordan; 7 Mike Kinkade; 30 Dave Roberts; 5 Jason Romano; 26 Wilkin Ruan; Other batters: 14 Larry Barnes; 52 Chin-Feng Chen; 55 Koyie Hill; 36 Daryle Ward	Manager: 12 Jim Tracy; Coaches: 22 Jack Clark (hitting); 48 Jim Colborn (pitching); 22 George Hendrick (hitting); 35 Glenn Hoffman (third base); 18 Jim Lett (bullpen); 11 Manny Mota; 25 Jim Riggleman (bench); 31 John Shelby (1st base)

== Game log ==
=== Regular season ===
Legend
	Dodgers win
	Dodgers loss
	Postponement
	Eliminated from playoff race
**Bold**	Dodgers team member

2003 regular season game log: 85–77 (Home: 46–35; Away: 39–42)
March: 1–0 (Home: 0–0; Away: 1–0)

#	Date	Time (PT)	Opponent	Score	Win	Loss	Save	Time of Game	Attendance	Record	Box/ Streak
1	March 31	2:05 p.m. PST	@ Diamondbacks	**W** 8–0	**Nomo** (1–0)	Johnson (0–1)	—	2:51	47,356	1–0	W1

April: 13–14 (Home: 7–5; Away: 6–9)

#	Date	Time (PT)	Opponent	Score	Win	Loss	Save	Time of Game	Attendance	Record	Box/ Streak
2	April 1	5:35 p.m. PST	@ Diamondbacks	L 4–5 (10)	Mantei (1–0)	**Shuey** (0–1)	—	2:51	35,979	1–1	L1
3	April 2	5:35 p.m. PST	@ Diamondbacks	**W** 5–0	**Brown** (1–0)	Dessens (0–1)	—	2:33	30,374	2–1	W1
4	April 3		@ Padres	L 1–6						2–2	L1
5	April 4		@ Padres	L 2–4						2–3	L2
6	April 5		@ Padres	L 0–3						2–4	L3
7	April 6		@ Padres	**W** 41–3 (10)						3–4	W1
8	April 7	1:10 p.m. PDT	Diamondbacks	L 4–6 (12)	Mantei (2–0)	**Ashby** (0–1)	Service (1)	3:54	53,819	3–5	L1
9	April 8	7:10 p.m. PDT	Diamondbacks	**W** 5–3	**Shuey** (1–1)	Batista (0–2)	**Gagné** (1)	2:52	30,341	4–5	W1
10	April 9	1:10 p.m. PDT	Diamondbacks	**W** 5–2	**Dreifort** (1–1)	Kim (0–2)	**Gagné** (2)	2:58	25,764	5–5	W2
14	April 15		Padres	L 2–3						5–9	L1
15	April 16		Padres	**W** 3–0						5–9	W1
16	April 17		Padres	**W** 4–3						5–9	W2
23	April 25		@ Pirates	**W** 5–2						10–13	W1
24	April 26		@ Pirates	**W** 4–3						11–13	W2
25	April 27		@ Pirates	**W** 6–2						12–13	W3

May: 17–10 (Home: 10–5; Away: 7–5)

#	Date	Time (PT)	Opponent	Score	Win	Loss	Save	Time of Game	Attendance	Record	Box/ Streak
30	May 2		Pirates	L 3–5						15–16	L2
31	May 3		Pirates	**W** 4–1						15–16	W1
32	May 4		Pirates	**W** 3–2						16–16	W2
39	May 12		Braves	L 4–11						20–19	L1
40	May 13		Braves	L 1–3						20–20	L2
41	May 14		Braves	**W** 5–1						21–20	W1
42	May 16		Marlins	**W** 2–1						22–20	W2
43	May 17		Marlins	**W** 4–1						22–20	W3
44	May 18		Marlins	**W** 2–1						24–20	W4

June: 14–11 (Home: 7–6; Away: 7–5)

#	Date	Time (PT)	Opponent	Score	Win	Loss	Save	Time of Game	Attendance	Record	Box/ Streak
57	June 3		Royals	**W** 4–3						32–25	W1
58	June 4		Royals	L 1–2						32–26	L1
59	June 5		Royals	**W** 5–2						33–26	W1
60	June 6		White Sox	**W** 2–1						34–26	W2
61	June 7		White Sox	L 1–4						34–27	L1
62	June 8		White Sox	L 3–10						34–28	L2
63	June 10		@ Tigers	**W** 3–1 (12)						35–28	W1
64	June 11		@ Tigers	**W** 3–1						36–28	W2
65	June 12		@ Tigers	**W** 3–2						37–28	W3
72	June 20	7:10 p.m. PDT	Angels	**W** 5–2	**Nomo** (8–6)	Washburn (6–8)	**Gagné** (28)	2:32	54,573	43–29	W1
73	June 21	1:10 p.m. PDT	Angels	**W** 4–2	**Ashby** (2–4)	Lackey (4–7)	**Gagné** (29)	2:31	51,874	44–29	W2
74	June 22	1:10 p.m. PDT	Angels	L 3–6	Appier (5–4)	**Brown** (10–2)	Percival (12)	3:10	54,631	44–30	L1
78	June 27	7:05 p.m. PDT	@ Angels	L 0–3	Lackey (5–7)	**Brown** (10–3)	Percival (14)	2:17	43,700	45–33	L1
79	June 28	7:05 p.m. PDT	@ Angels	L 1–3	Appier (6–4)	**Ishii** (7–3)	Percival (15)	2:36	43,726	45–34	L2
80	June 29	1:05 p.m. PDT	@ Angels	L 1–3	Sele (4–6)	**Pérez** (4–7)	Percival (16)	2:37	43,766	45–35	L3

July: 9–18 (Home: 5–9; Away: 4–9)

#	Date	Time (PT)	Opponent	Score	Win	Loss	Save	Time of Game	Attendance	Record	Box/ Streak
81	July 1		Padres	L 1–7						45–36	L1
82	July 2		Padres	L 3–4 (10)						45–37	L1
83	July 3		Padres	L 4–7						45–38	L1
84	July 4	6:10 p.m. PDT	Diamondbacks	L 1–3 (10)	Villarreal (6–4)	**Martin** (0–2)	Mantei (8)	3:23	55,038	45–39	L7
85	July 5	1:10 p.m. PDT	Diamondbacks	**W** 2–0	**Pérez** (5–7)	Dessens (5–5)	**Gagné** (30)	2:21	38,956	46–39	W1
86	July 6	5:10 p.m. PDT	Diamondbacks	L 1–2	Good (4–2)	**Nomo** (9–8)	Mantei (9)	2:48	41,769	46–40	L1
87	July 7		@ Padres	L 1–7						46–41	L2
88	July 8		@ Padres	L 5–8						46–42	L3
89	July 9		@ Cardinals	**W** 6–5						47–42	W1
90	July 10		@ Cardinals	**W** 9–4						48–42	W2
—	July 15	5:38 p.m. PDT	74th All-Star Game	National League vs. American League (U.S. Cellular Field, Chicago, Illinois)							
94	July 17		Cardinals	**W** 6–3						50–44	W2
95	July 18		Cardinals	**W** 8–5						51–44	W3
96	July 19		Cardinals	L 1–3						51–45	L1
97	July 20		Cardinals	L 7–10						51–46	L2
102	July 25	7:05 p.m. PDT	@ Diamondbacks	L 1–2 (15)	Randolph (5–0)	**Quantrill** (1–3)	—	4:10	41,382	53–49	L1
103	July 26	1:05 p.m. PDT	@ Diamondbacks	L 0–1	Dessens (6–7)	**Ashby** (2–8)	Mantei (11)	2:28	45,421	53–50	L2
104	July 27	1:35 p.m. PDT	@ Diamondbacks	**W** 1–0	**Nomo** (12–8)	Schilling (5–6)	**Gagné** (35)	2:39	42,067	54–50	W1

August: 17–11 (Home: 11–4; Away: 6–7)

#	Date	Time (PT)	Opponent	Score	Win	Loss	Save	Time of Game	Attendance	Record	Box/ Streak
108	August 1		@ Braves	L 0–2						54–54	L4
109	August 2		@ Braves	L 4–6						54–55	L5
110	August 3		@ Braves	**W** 8–4						55–55	W1
114	August 8		Cubs	**W** 3–1						59–55	W5
115	August 9		Cubs	**W** 6–1						60–55	W6
116	August 10		Cubs	L 1–3						60–56	L1
117	August 11		@ Marlins	**W** 9–3						61–56	W1
118	August 12		@ Marlins	L 4–5 (13)						61–57	L1
119	August 13		@ Marlins	L 1–2 (11)						61–58	L2
120	August 14		@ Marlins	**W** 6–4						62–58	W1
121	August 15		@ Cubs	L 1–2						62–59	L1
122	August 16		@ Cubs	**W** 10–5						63–59	W1
123	August 17		@ Cubs	**W** 3–0						64–59	W2

September: 14–13 (Home: 6–6; Away: 8–7)

#	Date	Time (PT)	Opponent	Score	Win	Loss	Save	Time of Game	Attendance	Record	Box/ Streak
142	September 8	6:35 p.m. PDT	@ Diamondbacks	**W** 10–3	**Mota** (6–2)	Villarreal (7–7)	—	2:57	25,937	76–66	W4
143	September 9	6:35 p.m. PDT	@ Diamondbacks	**W** 4–1	**Jackson** (1–0)	Johnson (4–8)	**Gagné** (50)	2:22	36,488	77–66	W5
144	September 10	6:35 p.m. PDT	@ Diamondbacks	L 4–5	Villarreal (8–7)	**Quantrill** (1–5)	Mantei (22)	2:43	28,985	77–67	L1
145	September 11	6:35 p.m. PDT	@ Diamondbacks	L 0–2	Capuano (2–3)	**Pérez** (12–11)	Mantei (23)	2:22	28,459	77–68	L2
146	September 12		Padres	**W** 6–0						78–68	W1
147	September 13		Padres	**W** 4–0						79–68	W2
148	September 14		Padres	**W** 5–2						80–68	W3
149	September 16	7:10 p.m. PDT	Diamondbacks	L 2–3	Schilling (8–8)	**Ishii** (9–6)	Mantei (24)	2:44	31,689	80–69	L1
150	September 17	7:10 p.m. PDT	Diamondbacks	L 0–2	Webb (10–7)	**Jackson** (1–1)	Mantei (25)	2:33	35,162	80–70	L2
151	September 18	1:05 p.m. PDT	Diamondbacks	**W** 2–0	**Álvarez** (6–1)	Batista (10–9)	**Gagné** (52)	2:24	36,523	81–70	W1
155	September 22		@ Padres	L 5–9						82–73	L1
4	September 23		@ Padres	**W** 2–1						83–73	W1
4	September 24		@ Padres	**W** 2–1 (10)						84–73	W2
4	September 25		@ Padres	L 1–6						84–74	L1

=== Detailed records ===
**National League**
Opponent	Home	Away	Total	Pct.	Runs scored	Runs allowed
**NL East**
Atlanta Braves	1–2	1–2	2–4	.333	22	27
Florida Marlins	4–0	1–2	5–2	.714	28	17
	**5–2**	**1–4**	**7–6**	**.538**	**50**	**44**
**NL Central**
Chicago Cubs	2–1	2–1	4–2	.667	24	12
Pittsburgh Pirates	3–0	2–1	5–1	.833	25	15
St. Louis Cardinals	2–2	2–0	4–2	.800	37	30
	**7–3**	**6–2**	**13–5**	**.722**	**86**	**57**
**NL West**
Arizona Diamondbacks	4–5	5–5	9–10	.474	59	40
Colorado Rockies	8–2	4–5	12–7	.632	84	75
**Los Angeles Dodgers**	—	—	—	—	—	—
San Diego Padres	5–4	3–7	8–11	.421	55	74
San Francisco Giants
	**17–11**	**12–15**	**29–26**	**.527**	**198**	**189**

**American League**
Opponent	Home	Away	Total	Pct.	Runs scored	Runs allowed
**AL Central**
Chicago White Sox	1–2	0–0	1–2	.333	6	15
Detroit Tigers	0–0	3–0	3–0	1.000	9	4
Kansas City Royals	2–1	0–0	2–1	.667	10	7
	**3–3**	**3–0**	**6–3**	**.667**	**25**	**26**
**AL West**
Anaheim Angels	2–1	0–3	2–4	.333	14	19
	**2–1**	**0–3**	**2–4**	**.333**	**14**	**19**

== Starting Pitchers stats ==
Note: G = Games pitched; GS = Games started; IP = Innings pitched; W/L = Wins/Losses; ERA = Earned run average; BB = Walks allowed; SO = Strikeouts; CG = Complete games

Name	G	GS	IP	W/L	ERA	BB	SO	CG
Hideo Nomo	33	33	218.1	16-13	3.09	98	177	2
Kevin Brown	32	32	211.0	14-9	2.39	56	185	0
Odalis Pérez	30	30	185.1	12-12	4.52	46	141	0
Kazuhisa Ishii	27	27	147.0	9-7	3.86	101	140	0
Wilson Álvarez	21	12	95.0	6-2	2.37	23	82	1
Andy Ashby	21	12	73.0	3-10	5.18	17	41	0
Darren Dreifort	10	10	60.1	4-4	4.03	25	67	0
Edwin Jackson	4	3	22.0	2-1	2.45	11	19	0
Masao Kida	3	2	12.0	0-1	3.00	3	8	0

== Relief Pitchers stats ==
Note: G = Games pitched; GS = Games started; IP = Innings pitched; W/L = Wins/Losses; ERA = Earned run average; BB = Walks allowed; SO = Strikeouts; SV = Saves

Name	G	GS	IP	W/L	ERA	BB	SO	SV
Éric Gagné	77	0	82.1	2-3	1.20	20	137	55
Paul Quantrill	89	0	77.1	2-5	1.75	15	44	1
Tom Martin	80	0	51.0	1-2	3.53	24	51	0
Guillermo Mota	76	0	105.0	6-3	1.97	26	99	1
Paul Shuey	62	0	69.0	6-4	3.00	33	60	0
Steve Colyer	13	0	19.2	0-0	2.75	9	16	0
Troy Brohawn	12	0	11.2	2-0	3.86	4	13	0
Rodney Myers	4	0	9.0	0-0	6.00	4	5	0
Víctor Alvarez	5	0	5.2	0-1	12.71	6	3	0
Scott Mullen	1	0	3.0	0-0	9.00	5	1	0

== Batting Stats ==
Note: Pos = Position; G = Games; AB = At bats; Avg. = Batting average; R = Runs scored; H = Hits; HR = Home runs; RBI = Runs batted in; SB = Stolen bases

Name	Pos	G	AB	Avg.	R	H	HR	RBI	SB
Paul Lo Duca	C/1B	147	568	.273	64	155	7	52	0
David Ross	C	40	124	.258	19	32	10	18	0
Todd Hundley	C	21	33	.182	2	6	2	11	0
Koyie Hill	C	3	3	.333	0	1	0	0	0
Fred McGriff	1B	86	297	.249	32	74	13	40	0
Alex Cora	2B/SS	148	477	.249	39	119	4	34	4
César Izturis	SS	158	558	.251	47	140	1	40	10
Adrián Beltré	3B	158	559	.240	50	134	23	80	2
Ron Coomer	1B/3B	69	125	.240	11	30	4	15	0
Robin Ventura	1B/3B	49	109	.220	11	24	5	13	0
Joe Thurston	2B	12	10	.200	2	2	0	0	0
Shawn Green	RF	160	611	.280	84	171	19	85	6
Dave Roberts	CF	107	388	.250	56	97	2	16	40
Jeromy Burnitz	LF	61	230	.204	25	47	13	4	
Jolbert Cabrera	OF/IF	128	347	.282	43	98	6	37	6
Brian Jordan	LF/CF/RF	66	224	.299	28	67	6	28	1
Mike Kinkade	LF/RF/1B/3B	88	162	.216	25	35	5	14	1
Daryle Ward	LF/1B	52	109	.183	6	20	0	9	0
Rickey Henderson	LF	30	72	.208	7	15	2	5	3
Wilkin Ruan	CF	21	41	.220	2	9	0	2	1
Larry Barnes	LF	30	38	.211	2	8	0	2	0
Jason Romano	LF/RF/CF/2B	37	36	.083	3	3	0	0	2
Chad Hermansen	LF	11	25	.160	2	4	0	2	0
Bubba Crosby	LF	9	12	.083	0	1	0	1	0
Chin-Feng Chen	OF	1	1	.000	0	0	0	0	0

== 2003 Awards ==
- 2003 Major League Baseball All-Star Game
  - Éric Gagné reserve
  - Paul Lo Duca reserve
  - Kevin Brown did not play due to injury
- National League Cy Young Award
  - Éric Gagné
- Rolaids Relief Man of the Year
  - Éric Gagné
- TSN National League All-Star
  - Éric Gagné
- TSN NL Pitcher of the Year
  - Éric Gagné
- TSN NL Reliever of the Year Award
  - Éric Gagné
- Players choice: NL Outstanding Pitcher
  - Éric Gagné
- NL Pitcher of the Month
  - Kevin Brown (May 2003)
- NL Player of the Week
  - Éric Gagné (Aug. 4–10)

== Farm system ==
Level	Team	League	Manager
AAA	Las Vegas 51s	Pacific Coast League	John Shoemaker
AA	Jacksonville Suns	Southern League	Dino Ebel
High A	Vero Beach Dodgers	Florida State League	Scott Little
A	South Georgia Waves	South Atlantic League	Dann Bilardello
Rookie	Ogden Raptors	Pioneer League	Travis Barbary
Rookie	Gulf Coast Dodgers	Gulf Coast League	Luis Salazar
Rookie	DSL Dodgers; DSL Dodgers 2	Dominican Summer League	

== Major League Baseball draft ==
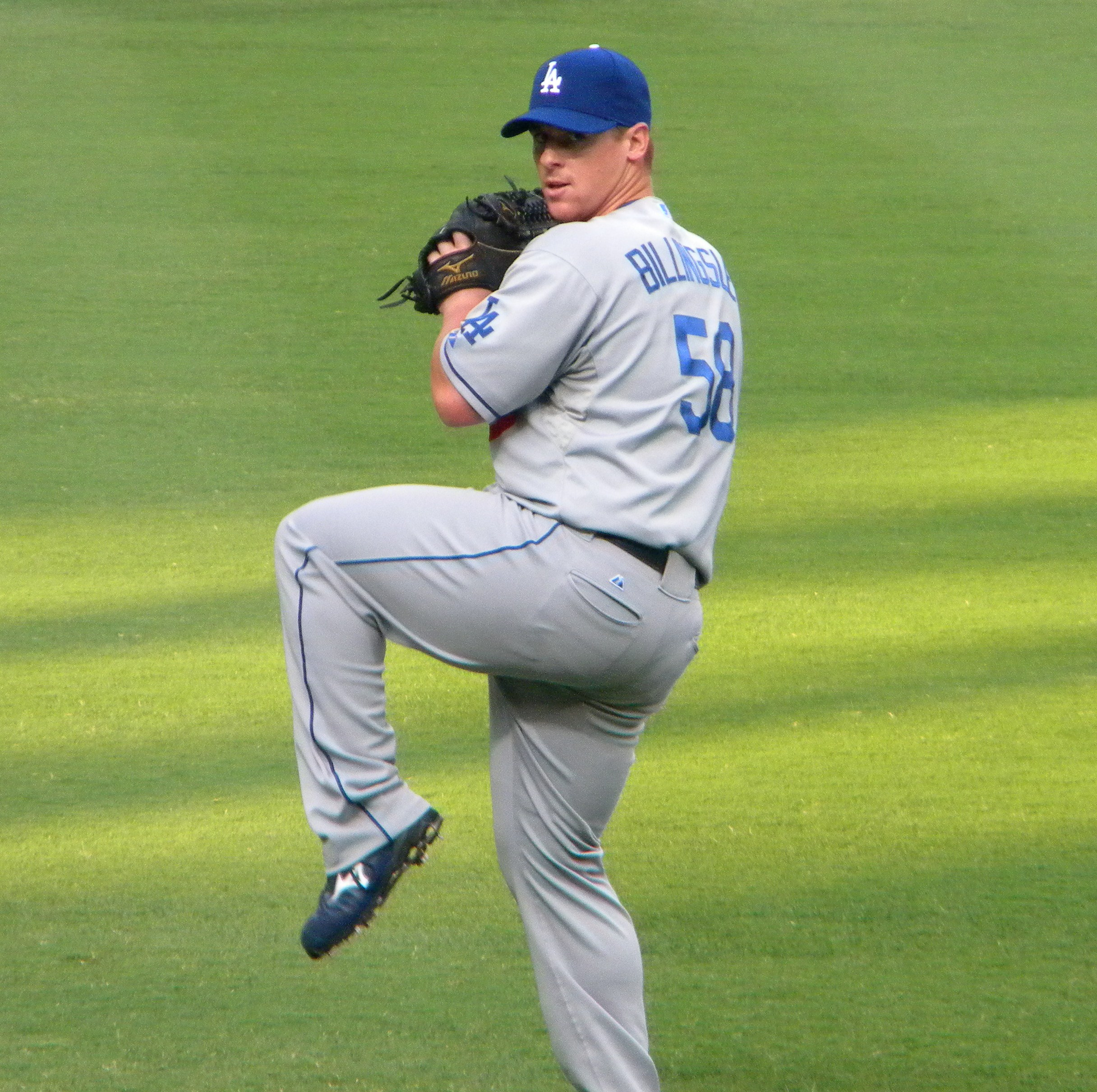
Chad Billingsley

The Dodgers selected 50 players in this draft. Of those, 12 of them would eventually play Major League baseball.

The first round pick was right handed pitcher Chad Billingsley from Defiance High School in Defiance, Ohio. He was a 2009 All-Star and pitched eight seasons with the Dodgers with an 81–61 record and 3.65 ERA in 219 games (190 starts) before missing most of 2013 and all of 2014 with serious arm injuries.

The sixth round pick, outfielder Matt Kemp from Midwest City High School would lead the National League in Home Runs and RBIs in 2011 as well as finishing second in the MVP vote that year.

The draft class also included catcher A. J. Ellis (18th round), who would become the Dodgers starting catcher in 2012.

2003 draft picks

Round	Name	Position	School	Signed	Career span	Highest level
1	Chad Billingsley	RHP	Defiance High School	Yes	2003–2015	MLB
2	Chuck Tiffany	LHP	Charter Oak High School	Yes	2003–2011	AA
3	Cory VanAllen	LHP	Clements High School	No; Nationals-2006	2006–2015	AAA
4	Xavier Paul	OF	Slidell High School	Yes	2003–2018	MLB
5	Jordan Pratt	RHP	Central High School	Yes	2003–2010	AAA
6	Matt Kemp	OF	Midwest City High School	Yes	2003–2020	MLB
7	Wesley Wright	LHP	Goshen High School	Yes	2003–2017	MLB
8	Lucas May	3B	Parkway West High School	Yes	2003–2014	MLB
9	Brett Dowdy	2B	University of Florida	No; Orioles-2004	2003–2012	AAA
10	Phil Sobkow	RHP	University of Central Missouri	Yes	2003–2009	A
11	Anthony Harper	C	Oak Creek High School	Yes	2004–2007	A+
12	Cody White	LHP	Pleasant Grove High School	Yes	2004–2012	AAA
13	Derik Olvey	RHP	Pelham High School	No		
14	David Pfeiffer	LHP	Lincoln Park Academy	Yes	2004–2011	AAA
15	Russ Mitchell	SS	Cartersville High School	Yes	2003–2013	MLB
16	James Peterson	1B	Indian Hills Community College	Yes	2004–2007	A
17	Steven Sapp	OF	West High School	Yes	2003–2005	A
18	A. J. Ellis	C	Austin Peay State University	Yes	2003–2018	MLB
19	Matt Antonelli	SS	St. John's Preparatory School	No; Padres-2006	2006–2013	MLB
20	Chad Barben	3B	Taylorsville High School	No		
21	Travis Denker	2B	Brea Olinda High School	Yes	2003–2017	MLB
22	Douglas Frame	LHP	Tomball High School	No		
23	Taylor Slimak	C	California Lutheran University	Yes	2003	Rookie
24	Ben Snyder	LHP	Bellevue High School	No; Giants-2006	2006–2012	AAA
25	Kevin Skogley	LHP	Hermiston Senior High School	No; White Sox	2007–2009	A
26	Thomas Piazza	C	Palm Beach Atlantic University	Yes	2003–2005	Rookie
27	Jesús Castillo	RHP	Tucson High School	Yes	2004–2022	AAA
28	Adam Moore	C	Northeast Texas Community College	No; Mariners-2006	2006–2019	MLB
29	Adam Parliament	OF	Penticton Secondary School	No; Braves-2005	2005–2007	A+
30	Mark Melancon	RHP	Golden High School	No; Yankees-2006	2006–2023	MLB
31	Garrett Kohler	RHP	Cimarron-Memorial High School	No		
32	Kyle Reichert	RHP	Porterville College	No		
33	Ryan Zaft	RHP	Yuba Community College	No		
34	James Lawler	1B	A&M Consolidated High School	No		
35	Antonio Anderson	OF	Greene County High School	No		
36	Andrew Jeffcoat	LHP	James W. Martin High School	No		
37	Mike Ludwig	1B	St. Olaf College	Yes	2003–2004	Rookie
38	Justin Ferreira	OF	Stoneman–Douglas High School	No		
39	Andy LaRoche	SS	Grayson County College	Yes	2003–2016	MLB
40	D. J. Lewis	1B	San Fernando High School	No; Cubs-2005	2005–2007	A
41	Matthew Votaw	3B	Brea Olinda High School	No		
42	Cory Vanderhook	C	Golden West College	No; Cubs-2006	2006–2007	Rookie
43	Clayton Van Hook	SS	Brenham High School	No		
44	Travis Check	C	Logan High School	No	2007	Ind
45	Cass Rhynes	C	Bluefield High School	No		
46	Steven Paddock	OF	Milford High School	No		
47	Matthew Chase	RHP	Florin High School	No		
48	Kyle Rapp	OF	Milford High School	No		
49	Clarence Farmer	OF	University of Arizona	No		
50	Curtis Hudson	C	Yuba Community College	No		

51.
