= Kevin Ohme =

American baseball player (born 1971)

- Pitcher
- Born: April 13, 1971 (age 55); Palm Beach, Florida, U.S.
- Batted: Left Threw: Left

Professional debut
- NPB: April 5, 2000, for the Nippon-Ham Fighters
- MLB: April 14, 2003, for the St. Louis Cardinals

Last appearance
- NPB: April 6, 2001, for the Nippon-Ham Fighters
- MLB: April 15, 2003, for the St. Louis Cardinals

NPB statistics
- Win–loss record: 2–5
- Earned run average: 6.20
- Strikeouts: 33

MLB statistics
- Win–loss record: 0–0
- Earned run average: 0.00
- Strikeouts: 2
- Stats at Baseball Reference

Teams
- Nippon-Ham Fighters (2000–2001); St. Louis Cardinals (2003)

Kevin Arthur Ohme (born April 13, 1971) is an American former Major League Baseball (MLB) pitcher. Ohme played for the St. Louis Cardinals in 2003. In 2 career games, he had a 0–0 record, with a 0.00 ERA. He pitched in 4.1 innings in his 2 career games, with 2 strikeouts. He batted and threw left-handed, and a hit in his only MLB at-bat gave him a rare career batting average of 1.000.

Ohme was drafted by the Minnesota Twins in the 9th round of the 1993 amateur draft.

He also played in Japan's Nippon Professional Baseball, in 2000 and 2001, with the Nippon-Ham Fighters.
