= Bo Hart =

American baseball player (born 1976)

- Second baseman
- Born: September 27, 1976 (age 50); Creswell, Oregon, U.S.
- Batted: Right Threw: Right

MLB debut
- June 19, 2003, for the St. Louis Cardinals

Last MLB appearance
- April 29, 2004, for the St. Louis Cardinals

MLB statistics
- Batting average: .274
- Home runs: 4
- Runs batted in: 30
- Stats at Baseball Reference

Teams
- St. Louis Cardinals (2003–2004)

Bodhi J. "Bo" Hart (born September 27, 1976) is an American former professional baseball player. He played second base in Major League Baseball in 2003 and 2004 for the St. Louis Cardinals.

== Early years ==
Hart was born in Creswell, Oregon, in 1976, but spent much of his childhood in Capitola, California. After graduating from Soquel High School, he attended Gonzaga University, where he played college baseball for the Bulldogs from 1999 to 2000. In 1998, he played collegiate summer baseball with the Cotuit Kettleers of the Cape Cod Baseball League. He was later drafted in the 33rd round of the 1999 Major League Baseball draft by the St. Louis Cardinals.

== St. Louis Cardinals ==
Hart made his Major League Baseball debut with the St. Louis Cardinals on June 19, 2003. He broke a major league record (previously held by Kirby Puckett) when he hit .460 in his first ten games with St. Louis, making his first month in the majors among the best debut months for a player in major league history. Hart's batting average remained above .300 until August 14, 2003, and he finished the season with 82 hits and a .277 average. After the first month of the 2004 season, Hart was assigned to the minor leagues.

== Post-MLB career ==
On February 10, 2006, Hart signed a minor league contract with the Colorado Rockies with an invitation to spring training, but did not make the major league club. Hart then played a portion of the 2007 baseball season with the Lancaster Barnstormers, where he hit .245 with 12 RBI and 2 home runs in 98 at bats. On June 15, 2007, he signed a contract with the Chicago Cubs and joined the clubs' Triple-A affiliate in Iowa. On July 16, 2007, Hart was traded to the Baltimore Orioles and assigned to their Triple-A team.

=== 2008 season ===
In his last professional season, Hart played part of 2008 with the Schaumburg Flyers of the independent Northern League. He was released on July 17, 2008. He later signed with the Kansas City T-Bones of the Northern League on July 20, 2008.
