= Mike Williams (baseball) =

American baseball player (born 1968)

- Pitcher
- Born: July 29, 1968 (age 58); Radford, Virginia, U.S.
- Batted: Right Threw: Right

MLB debut
- June 30, 1992, for the Philadelphia Phillies

Last MLB appearance
- September 28, 2003, for the Philadelphia Phillies

MLB statistics
- Win–loss record: 32–54
- Earned run average: 4.45
- Strikeouts: 584
- Saves: 144
- Stats at Baseball Reference

Teams
- Philadelphia Phillies (1992–1996); Kansas City Royals (1997); Pittsburgh Pirates (1998–2001); Houston Astros (2001); Pittsburgh Pirates (2002–2003); Philadelphia Phillies (2003)

Career highlights and awards
- 2× All-Star (2002, 2003)

Michael Darren Williams (born July 29, 1968) is an American former professional baseball pitcher who played in Major League Baseball for 12 seasons with the Philadelphia Phillies, Kansas City Royals, Houston Astros and the Pittsburgh Pirates from 1992 through 2003. Listed at 6' 2", 190 lb., Williams batted and threw right handed. He was born in Radford, Virginia.

Williams was a two-time National League All-Star in 2002 and 2003. In 2002, he finished third in the league with 46 saves. In his career, he posted a record of 32–54 with 144 saves and a 4.45 earned run average. When he was selected to the 2003 All-Star game, he set the record for being the pitcher with the highest ERA while making an All-Star team. He still remains the only pitcher to play in an All-Star game while having an ERA of over 6.00 during the same regular season. One of Williams's most famous games was with the Phillies was on July 7, 1993, against the Los Angeles Dodgers. He was brought in as a reliever in the 14th inning, and pitched five shutout innings, gave up a single run in the top of the 20th inning, but subsequently won the game after the Phillies loaded the bases in the bottom of the inning and Lenny Dykstra hit a winning RBI double.

On September 24, 1996, after being hit by a ball in a previous inning, Williams threw a pitch inside to opposing pitcher Pedro Martínez of the Montreal Expos nearly hitting him, which led to Martínez charging after Williams and starting a bench-clearing brawl.

Williams grew up in Giles County in southwestern Virginia. Following his playing retirement, he returned to Giles County and has helped with many charities, being a big contributor to the Relay for Life cancer foundation in the community. Besides, the baseball field at Giles High School is named after him and his wife Melissa.

Williams played college baseball at Virginia Tech and in 2004 he was enshrined in the Virginia Tech Sports Hall of Fame.

== See also ==
- List of Major League Baseball career saves leaders
