= Mike Lincoln =

American baseball player (born 1975)

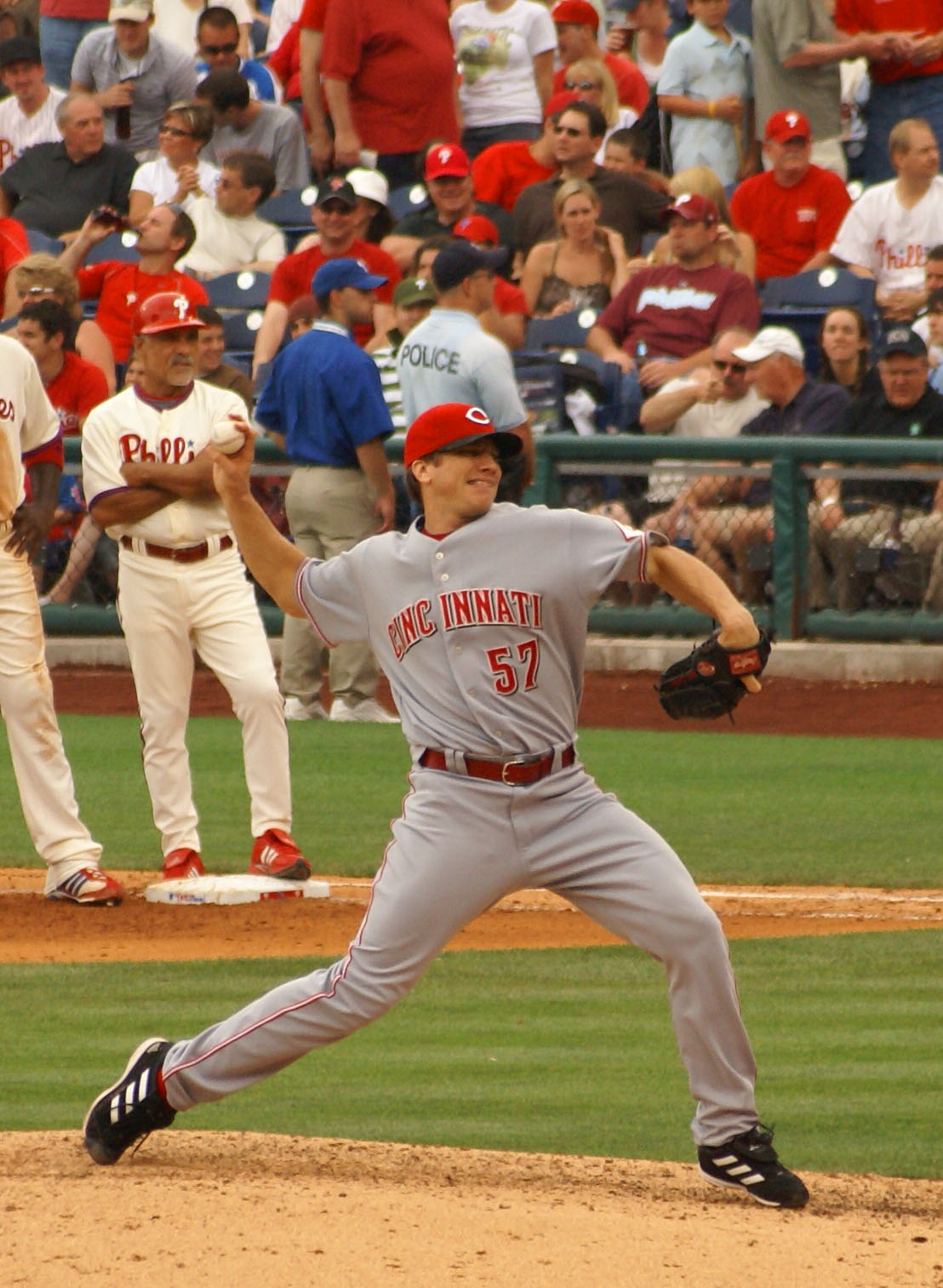
- Lincoln with the Cincinnati Reds in 2008
- Pitcher
- Born: April 10, 1975 (age 51); Carmichael, California, U.S.
- Batted: Right Threw: Right

MLB debut
- April 7, 1999, for the Minnesota Twins

Last MLB appearance
- May 31, 2010, for the Cincinnati Reds

MLB statistics
- Win–loss record: 17–30
- Earned run average: 5.33
- Strikeouts: 236
- Stats at Baseball Reference

Teams
- Minnesota Twins (1999–2000); Pittsburgh Pirates (2001–2003); St. Louis Cardinals (2004); Cincinnati Reds (2008–2010)

Michael George Lincoln (born April 10, 1975) is an American former professional baseball relief pitcher. Drafted in the 13th round of the 1996 Major League Baseball draft from the University of Tennessee by the Minnesota Twins, and he made his major league debut on April 7, 1999.

Lincoln had played in Major League Baseball (MLB) for the Minnesota Twins, Pittsburgh Pirates, and St. Louis Cardinals before signing as a free agent with the Cincinnati Reds on February 5, 2008, to a minor league contract with an invitation to spring training. He made the team out of spring training and went 2-5 with a 4.48 ERA in 64 games. On December 4, 2008, Lincoln signed a two-year contract to stay with the Reds.
