= 2003 Major League Baseball season =

2003 MLB season
- League: Major League Baseball
- Sport: Baseball
- Duration: March 30 – October 25, 2003
- Games: 162
- Teams: 30
- TV partner(s): Fox; ESPN

Draft
- Top draft pick: Delmon Young
- Picked by: Tampa Bay Devil Rays

Regular Season
- Season MVP: AL: Alex Rodriguez (TEX); NL: Barry Bonds (SF)

Postseason
- AL champions: New York Yankees
- AL runners-up: Boston Red Sox
- NL champions: Florida Marlins
- NL runners-up: Chicago Cubs

World Series
- Champions: Florida Marlins
- Runners-up: New York Yankees
- World Series MVP: Josh Beckett (FLA)

MLB seasons
- ← 2002 2004 →

Locations of AL teams for the 2000–2004 MLB seasons
West Central East
Locations of NL teams for the 2003 MLB season
West Central East

The 2003 Major League Baseball season ended when the Florida Marlins defeated the New York Yankees in a six-game World Series. The Detroit Tigers set the American League record for losses in a season, with 119, and the Marlins became the first franchise to win the World Series twice as a wild card team.

== Managers ==
=== American League ===
| Team | Manager | Comments |
|---|---|---|
| Anaheim Angels | Mike Scioscia | |
| Baltimore Orioles | Mike Hargrove | |
| Boston Red Sox | Grady Little | |
| Chicago White Sox± | Jerry Manuel | Hosted the All-Star Game |
| Cleveland Indians | Eric Wedge | |
| Detroit Tigers | Alan Trammell | |
| Kansas City Royals | Tony Peña | |
| Minnesota Twins | Ron Gardenhire | |
| New York Yankees | Joe Torre | Won the AL pennant |
| Oakland Athletics | Ken Macha | |
| Seattle Mariners | Bob Melvin | |
| Tampa Bay Devil Rays | Lou Piniella | |
| Texas Rangers | Buck Showalter | |
| Toronto Blue Jays | Carlos Tosca | |

=== National League ===
| Team | Manager | Comments |
|---|---|---|
| Arizona Diamondbacks | Bob Brenly | |
| Atlanta Braves | Bobby Cox | |
| Chicago Cubs | Dusty Baker | |
| Cincinnati Reds | Bob Boone | Replaced during the season by Dave Miley |
| Colorado Rockies | Clint Hurdle | |
| Florida Marlins | Jeff Torborg | Replaced during the season by Jack McKeon, won World Series |
| Houston Astros | Jimy Williams | |
| Los Angeles Dodgers | Jim Tracy | |
| Milwaukee Brewers | Ned Yost | |
| Montreal Expos | Frank Robinson | |
| New York Mets | Art Howe | |
| Philadelphia Phillies | Larry Bowa | |
| Pittsburgh Pirates | Lloyd McClendon | |
| St. Louis Cardinals | Tony La Russa | |
| San Diego Padres | Bruce Bochy | |
| San Francisco Giants | Felipe Alou | |

±hosted the MLB All Star Game

== Standings ==
=== American League ===
AL East
| Team | W | L | Pct. | GB | Home | Road |
|---|---|---|---|---|---|---|
| ^{(1)} New York Yankees | 101 | 61 | .623 | — | 50‍–‍32 | 51‍–‍29 |
| ^{(4)} Boston Red Sox | 95 | 67 | .586 | 6 | 53‍–‍28 | 42‍–‍39 |
| Toronto Blue Jays | 86 | 76 | .531 | 15 | 41‍–‍40 | 45‍–‍36 |
| Baltimore Orioles | 71 | 91 | .438 | 30 | 40‍–‍40 | 31‍–‍51 |
| Tampa Bay Devil Rays | 63 | 99 | .389 | 38 | 36‍–‍45 | 27‍–‍54 |

AL Central
| Team | W | L | Pct. | GB | Home | Road |
|---|---|---|---|---|---|---|
| ^{(3)} Minnesota Twins | 90 | 72 | .556 | — | 48‍–‍33 | 42‍–‍39 |
| Chicago White Sox | 86 | 76 | .531 | 4 | 51‍–‍30 | 35‍–‍46 |
| Kansas City Royals | 83 | 79 | .512 | 7 | 40‍–‍40 | 43‍–‍39 |
| Cleveland Indians | 68 | 94 | .420 | 22 | 38‍–‍43 | 30‍–‍51 |
| Detroit Tigers | 43 | 119 | .265 | 47 | 23‍–‍58 | 20‍–‍61 |

AL West
| Team | W | L | Pct. | GB | Home | Road |
|---|---|---|---|---|---|---|
| ^{(2)} Oakland Athletics | 96 | 66 | .593 | — | 57‍–‍24 | 39‍–‍42 |
| Seattle Mariners | 93 | 69 | .574 | 3 | 50‍–‍31 | 43‍–‍38 |
| Anaheim Angels | 77 | 85 | .475 | 19 | 45‍–‍37 | 32‍–‍48 |
| Texas Rangers | 71 | 91 | .438 | 25 | 43‍–‍38 | 28‍–‍53 |

=== National League ===
NL East
| Team | W | L | Pct. | GB | Home | Road |
|---|---|---|---|---|---|---|
| ^{(1)} Atlanta Braves | 101 | 61 | .623 | — | 55‍–‍26 | 46‍–‍35 |
| ^{(4)} Florida Marlins | 91 | 71 | .562 | 10 | 53‍–‍28 | 38‍–‍43 |
| Philadelphia Phillies | 86 | 76 | .531 | 15 | 49‍–‍32 | 37‍–‍44 |
| Montreal Expos | 83 | 79 | .512 | 18 | 52‍–‍29 | 31‍–‍50 |
| New York Mets | 66 | 95 | .410 | 34½ | 34‍–‍46 | 32‍–‍49 |

NL Central
| Team | W | L | Pct. | GB | Home | Road |
|---|---|---|---|---|---|---|
| ^{(3)} Chicago Cubs | 88 | 74 | .543 | — | 44‍–‍37 | 44‍–‍37 |
| Houston Astros | 87 | 75 | .537 | 1 | 48‍–‍33 | 39‍–‍42 |
| St. Louis Cardinals | 85 | 77 | .525 | 3 | 48‍–‍33 | 37‍–‍44 |
| Pittsburgh Pirates | 75 | 87 | .463 | 13 | 39‍–‍42 | 36‍–‍45 |
| Cincinnati Reds | 69 | 93 | .426 | 19 | 35‍–‍46 | 34‍–‍47 |
| Milwaukee Brewers | 68 | 94 | .420 | 20 | 31‍–‍50 | 37‍–‍44 |

NL West
| Team | W | L | Pct. | GB | Home | Road |
|---|---|---|---|---|---|---|
| ^{(2)} San Francisco Giants | 100 | 61 | .621 | — | 57‍–‍24 | 43‍–‍37 |
| Los Angeles Dodgers | 85 | 77 | .525 | 15½ | 46‍–‍35 | 39‍–‍42 |
| Arizona Diamondbacks | 84 | 78 | .519 | 16½ | 45‍–‍36 | 39‍–‍42 |
| Colorado Rockies | 74 | 88 | .457 | 26½ | 49‍–‍32 | 25‍–‍56 |
| San Diego Padres | 64 | 98 | .395 | 36½ | 35‍–‍46 | 29‍–‍52 |

== Postseason ==
=== Bracket ===
Division Series (ALDS, NLDS)
1 | NY Yankees | 3
3 | Minnesota | 1
American League
2 | Oakland | 2
4 | Boston | 3
1 | Atlanta | 2
3 | Chicago Cubs | 3
National League
2 | San Francisco | 1
4 | Florida | 3

League Championship Series (NLCS, ALCS)
1 | NY Yankees | 4
4 | Boston | 3
3 | Chicago Cubs | 3
4 | Florida | 4

World Series
AL1 | NY Yankees | 2
NL4 | Florida | 4

Note: Two teams in the same division could not meet in the division series.

== Statistical leaders ==
| Statistic | American League | | National League | |
|---|---|---|---|---|
| AVG | Bill Mueller BOS | .326 | Albert Pujols STL | .359 |
| HR | Alex Rodriguez TEX | 47 | Jim Thome PHI | 47 |
| RBI | Carlos Delgado TOR | 145 | Preston Wilson COL | 141 |
| Wins | Roy Halladay TOR | 22 | Russ Ortiz ATL | 21 |
| ERA | Pedro Martínez BOS | 2.22 | Jason Schmidt SF | 2.34 |
| SO | Esteban Loaiza CWS | 207 | Kerry Wood CHC | 266 |
| SV | Keith Foulke OAK | 43 | Éric Gagné LAD | 55 |
| SB | Carl Crawford TB | 55 | Juan Pierre FLA | 65 |

== Awards ==
Baseball Writers' Association of America Awards
| BBWAA Award | National League | American League |
|---|---|---|
| Rookie of the Year | Dontrelle Willis (FLA) | Ángel Berroa (KC) |
| Cy Young Award | Éric Gagné (LAD) | Roy Halladay (TOR) |
| Manager of the Year | Jack McKeon (FLA) | Tony Peña (KC) |
| Most Valuable Player | Barry Bonds (SF) | Alex Rodriguez (TEX) |
Gold Glove Awards
| Position | National League | American League |
| Pitcher | Mike Hampton (ATL) | Mike Mussina (NYY) |
| Catcher | Mike Matheny (STL) | Bengie Molina (ANA) |
| 1st Base | Derrek Lee (FLA) | John Olerud (SEA) |
| 2nd Base | Luis Castillo (FLA) | Bret Boone (SEA) |
| 3rd Base | Scott Rolen (STL) | Eric Chavez (OAK) |
| Shortstop | Édgar Rentería (STL) | Alex Rodriguez (TEX) |
| Outfield | José Cruz Jr. (SF); Jim Edmonds (STL); Andruw Jones (ATL) | Mike Cameron (SEA); Torii Hunter (MIN); Ichiro Suzuki (SEA) |
Silver Slugger Awards
| Position | National League | American League |
| Pitcher/Designated Hitter | Mike Hampton (ATL) | Edgar Martínez (SEA) |
| Catcher | Javy López (ATL) | Jorge Posada (NYY) |
| 1st Base | Todd Helton (COL) | Carlos Delgado (TOR) |
| 2nd Base | José Vidro (MON) | Bret Boone (SEA) |
| 3rd Base | Mike Lowell (FLA) | Bill Mueller (BOS) |
| Shortstop | Édgar Rentería (STL) | Alex Rodriguez (TEX) |
| Outfield | Barry Bonds (SGF); Albert Pujols (STL); Gary Sheffield (ATL) | Garret Anderson (ANA); Manny Ramirez (BOS); Vernon Wells (TOR) |

=== Other awards ===
- Outstanding Designated Hitter Award: David Ortiz (BOS)
- Hank Aaron Award: Alex Rodriguez (TEX), American); Albert Pujols (STL), National).
- Roberto Clemente Award (Humanitarian): Jamie Moyer (SEA).
- Rolaids Relief Man Award: Keith Foulke (OAK, American); Éric Gagné (LAD, National).
- Warren Spahn Award (Best left-handed pitcher): Andy Pettitte (NYY)

=== Player of the Month ===
| Month | American League | National League |
|---|---|---|
| April | Alfonso Soriano | Todd Helton |
| May | Edgar Martínez | Albert Pujols |
| June | Jason Giambi | Albert Pujols |
| July | Magglio Ordóñez | Barry Bonds |
| August | Alex Rodriguez | Vladimir Guerrero |
| September | Alfonso Soriano | Jim Thome |

=== Pitcher of the Month ===
| Month | American League | National League |
|---|---|---|
| April | Esteban Loaiza | Shawn Chacón |
| May | Roy Halladay | Kevin Brown |
| June | Freddy García | Dontrelle Willis |
| July | José Lima | Liván Hernández |
| August | Johan Santana | Mark Prior |
| September | Roy Halladay | Mark Prior |

=== Rookie of the Month ===
| Month | American League | National League |
|---|---|---|
| April | Rocco Baldelli | Hee-seop Choi |
| May | Rocco Baldelli | Xavier Nady |
| June | Hideki Matsui | Dontrelle Willis |
| July | Ángel Berroa | Miguel Cabrera |
| August | Rafael Soriano | Scott Podsednik |
| September | Reed Johnson | Miguel Cabrera |

== Home field attendance and payroll ==
| Team name | Wins | %± | Home attendance | %± | Per game | Est. payroll | %± |
|---|---|---|---|---|---|---|---|
| New York Yankees | 101 | −1.9% | 3,465,600 | 0.0% | 42,263 | $152,749,814 | 21.3% |
| Seattle Mariners | 93 | 0.0% | 3,268,509 | −7.7% | 40,352 | $86,959,167 | 8.3% |
| San Francisco Giants | 100 | 5.3% | 3,264,898 | 0.4% | 40,307 | $82,852,167 | 5.8% |
| Los Angeles Dodgers | 85 | −7.6% | 3,138,626 | 0.2% | 38,748 | $105,872,620 | 11.6% |
| Anaheim Angels | 77 | −22.2% | 3,061,094 | 32.8% | 37,330 | $79,031,667 | 28.0% |
| Chicago Cubs | 88 | 31.3% | 2,962,630 | 10.0% | 36,576 | $79,868,333 | 5.5% |
| St. Louis Cardinals | 85 | −12.4% | 2,910,386 | −3.4% | 35,931 | $83,786,666 | 12.2% |
| Arizona Diamondbacks | 84 | −14.3% | 2,805,542 | −12.3% | 34,636 | $80,657,000 | −21.6% |
| Boston Red Sox | 95 | 2.2% | 2,724,165 | 2.8% | 33,632 | $99,946,500 | −7.8% |
| Baltimore Orioles | 71 | 6.0% | 2,454,523 | −8.5% | 30,303 | $73,877,500 | 14.6% |
| Houston Astros | 87 | 3.6% | 2,454,241 | −2.5% | 30,299 | $71,040,000 | 12.0% |
| Atlanta Braves | 101 | 0.0% | 2,401,084 | −7.8% | 29,643 | $106,243,667 | 13.7% |
| Cincinnati Reds | 69 | −11.5% | 2,355,259 | 26.9% | 29,077 | $59,355,667 | 31.8% |
| Colorado Rockies | 74 | 1.4% | 2,334,085 | −14.7% | 28,816 | $67,179,667 | 18.2% |
| Philadelphia Phillies | 86 | 7.5% | 2,259,948 | 39.6% | 27,901 | $70,780,000 | 22.1% |
| Oakland Athletics | 96 | −6.8% | 2,216,596 | 2.2% | 27,365 | $50,260,834 | 25.6% |
| New York Mets | 66 | −12.0% | 2,140,599 | −23.7% | 26,757 | $117,176,429 | 23.8% |
| Texas Rangers | 71 | −1.4% | 2,094,394 | −11.0% | 25,857 | $103,491,667 | −2.1% |
| San Diego Padres | 64 | −3.0% | 2,030,084 | −8.6% | 25,063 | $45,210,000 | 9.1% |
| Minnesota Twins | 90 | −4.3% | 1,946,011 | 1.1% | 24,025 | $55,505,000 | 37.3% |
| Chicago White Sox | 86 | 6.2% | 1,939,524 | 15.7% | 23,945 | $51,010,000 | −10.6% |
| Toronto Blue Jays | 86 | 10.3% | 1,799,458 | 9.9% | 22,216 | $51,269,000 | −33.3% |
| Kansas City Royals | 83 | 33.9% | 1,779,895 | 34.5% | 22,249 | $40,518,000 | −14.3% |
| Cleveland Indians | 68 | −8.1% | 1,730,002 | −33.9% | 21,358 | $48,584,834 | −38.4% |
| Milwaukee Brewers | 68 | 21.4% | 1,700,354 | −13.7% | 20,992 | $40,627,000 | −19.2% |
| Pittsburgh Pirates | 75 | 4.2% | 1,636,751 | −8.3% | 20,207 | $54,812,429 | 29.5% |
| Detroit Tigers | 43 | −21.8% | 1,368,245 | −9.0% | 16,892 | $49,168,000 | −10.7% |
| Florida Marlins | 91 | 15.2% | 1,303,215 | 60.3% | 16,089 | $49,450,000 | 17.8% |
| Tampa Bay Devil Rays | 63 | 14.5% | 1,058,695 | −0.7% | 13,070 | $19,630,000 | −42.9% |
| Montreal Expos | 83 | 0.0% | 1,025,639 | 26.3% | 12,662 | $51,948,500 | 34.3% |

== Television coverage ==
This was the third season that national television coverage was split between ESPN and Fox Sports. ESPN and ESPN2 aired selected weeknight and Sunday night games, and selected Division Series playoff games. Fox televised Saturday baseball, the All-Star Game, selected Division Series games, both League Championship Series, and the World Series.

== Events ==
- April 2 – The Detroit Tigers become the first team to have four pitchers make their Major League debut in the same game. Jeremy Bonderman, Wilfredo Ledezma, Chris Spurling and Matt Roney all played in the 8–1 loss to the Minnesota Twins.
- May 11 – Rafael Palmeiro of the Texas Rangers became the 19th player in Major League history to hit 500 home runs in the seventh inning against the Cleveland Indians.
- May 23 – During the Atlanta Braves 15–3 victory over the Cincinnati Reds, Braves players Rafael Furcal, Mark DeRosa and Gary Sheffield hit consecutive home runs to start the game.
- June 13 – Roger Clemens of the New York Yankees:
  - Became the third member of the 4,000 strikeout club by striking out Édgar Rentería of the St. Louis Cardinals in the second inning.
  - Became the 21st member of the 300-win club, defeating the St. Louis Cardinals 5–2.
- June 23 – Barry Bonds steals his 500th career base, becoming the only member of baseball's 500 home run/500 stolen base club.

== See also ==
- 2003 Nippon Professional Baseball season
