= 2003 Milwaukee Brewers season =

2003 Milwaukee Brewers
- League: National League
- Division: Central
- Ballpark: Miller Park
- City: Milwaukee, Wisconsin, United States
- Record: 68–94 (.420)
- Divisional place: 6th
- Owners: Bud Selig
- General managers: Doug Melvin
- Managers: Ned Yost
- Television: WCGV-TV; FSN Wisconsin (Daron Sutton, Bill Schroeder)
- Radio: WTMJ (AM) (Bob Uecker, Jim Powell)

The 2003 Milwaukee Brewers season was the 34th season for the Brewers in Milwaukee, their 6th in the National League, and their 35th overall. The Brewers finished sixth in the National League Central with a record of 68 wins and 94 losses.

== Offseason ==
- October 11, 2002: Scott Podsednik was selected off waivers by the Milwaukee Brewers from the Seattle Mariners.
- November 5, 2002: Brooks Kieschnick was signed as a free agent with the Milwaukee Brewers.
- November 13, 2002: Scott Seabol was signed as a free agent with the Milwaukee Brewers.
- January 31, 2003: John Vander Wal was signed as a free agent with the Milwaukee Brewers.
- February 13, 2003: Tim Crabtree was signed as a free agent with the Milwaukee Brewers.

== Regular season ==
- On September 19, 2003, Arizona Diamondbacks pitcher Randy Johnson hit a home run off of Brewers pitcher Doug Davis, his only MLB home run.

=== Season standings ===
==== National League Central ====
NL Central
Team	W	L	Pct.	GB	Home	Road
Chicago Cubs	88	74	.543	—	44‍–‍37	44‍–‍37
Houston Astros	87	75	.537	1	48‍–‍33	39‍–‍42
St. Louis Cardinals	85	77	.525	3	48‍–‍33	37‍–‍44
Pittsburgh Pirates	75	87	.463	13	39‍–‍42	36‍–‍45
Cincinnati Reds	69	93	.426	19	35‍–‍46	34‍–‍47
Milwaukee Brewers	68	94	.420	20	31‍–‍50	37‍–‍44

==== Record vs. opponents ====
2003 National League record Source: MLB Standings Grid – 2003
Team	AZ	ATL	CHC	CIN	COL	FLA	HOU	LAD	MIL	MON	NYM	PHI	PIT	SD	SF	STL	AL
Arizona	—	2–5	2–4	7–2	10–9	2–5	5–1	10–9	3–3	4–2	4–2	4–2	3–3	9–10	5–14	3–3	11–4
Atlanta	5–2	—	4–2	3–3	6–0	9–10	5–1	4–2	4–2	12–7	11–8	9–10	7–2	6–1	2–4	4–2	10–5
Chicago	4–2	2–4	—	10–7	3–3	4–2	9–7	2–4	10–6	3–3	5–1	1–5	10–8	4–2	4–2	8–9	9–9
Cincinnati	2–7	3–3	7–10	—	4–2	2–4	5–12	2–4	8–10	2–4	2–4	5–4	5–11	3–3	3–3	9–7	7–5
Colorado	9–10	0–6	3–3	2–4	—	4–2	2–4	7–12	5–1	3–4	2–5	2–4	3–6	12–7	7–12	4–2	9–6
Florida	5–2	10–9	2–4	4–2	2–4	—	1–5	2–5	7–2	13–6	12–7	13–6	2–4	5–1	1–5	3–3	9–6
Houston	1–5	1–5	7–9	12–5	4–2	5–1	—	4–2	9–8	3–3	2–4	2–4	10–6	3–3	2–4	11–7	11–7
Los Angeles	9–10	2–4	4–2	4–2	12–7	5–2	2–4	—	4–2	4–2	3–3	2–5	5–1	8–11	6–13	4–2	11–7
Milwaukee	3–3	2–4	6–10	10–8	1–5	2–7	8–9	2–4	—	0–6	6–3	4–2	10–7	5–1	1–5	3–13	5–7
Montreal	2–4	7–12	3–3	4–2	4–3	6–13	3–3	2–4	6–0	—	14–5	8–11	3–3	4–2	7–0	1–5	9–9
New York	2–4	8–11	1–5	4–2	5–2	7–12	4–2	3–3	3–6	5–14	—	7–12	4–2	3–3	4–2	1–5	5–10
Philadelphia	2–4	10–9	5–1	4–5	4–2	6–13	4–2	5–2	2–4	11–8	12–7	—	2–4	4–3	3–3	4–2	8–7
Pittsburgh	3–3	2–7	8–10	11–5	6–3	4–2	6–10	1–5	7–10	3–3	2–4	4–2	—	4–2	2–4	7–10	5–7
San Diego	10–9	1–6	2–4	3–3	7–12	1–5	3–3	11–8	1–5	2–4	3–3	3–4	2–4	—	5–14	2–4	8–10
San Francisco	14–5	4–2	2–4	3–3	12–7	5–1	4–2	13–6	5–1	0–7	2–4	3–3	4–2	14–5	—	5–1	10–8
St. Louis	3–3	2–4	9–8	7–9	2–4	3–3	7–11	2–4	13–3	5–1	5–1	2–4	10–7	4–2	1–5	—	10–8

=== Transactions ===
- May 15, 2003: Scott Seabol was released by the Milwaukee Brewers.
- June 3, 2003: Tony Gwynn, Jr. was drafted by the Milwaukee Brewers in the 2nd round of the 2003 amateur draft. Player signed June 19, 2003.

== Roster ==
2003 Milwaukee Brewers
Roster
Pitchers: 43 Dave Burba; 48 Mike Crudale; 49 Doug Davis; 28 Valerio de los Santos; 48 Mike DeJean; 56 Jayson Durocher; 53 Leo Estrella; 52 Matt Ford; 40 John Foster; 26 Wayne Franklin; 55 Brooks Kieschnick; 50 Matt Kinney; 41 Dan Kolb; 33 Curtis Leskanic; 33 David Manning; 31 Luis Martínez; 47 Shane Nance; 33 Wes Obermueller; 37 Rubén Quevedo; 48,46 Todd Ritchie; 39 Glendon Rusch; 15 Ben Sheets; 51 Luis Vizcaíno	Catchers: 21 Keith Osik; 12 Eddie Pérez; Infielders: 10 Royce Clayton; 9 Enrique Cruz; 6 Keith Ginter; 2 Bill Hall; 18 Wes Helms; 11 Richie Sexson; 23 Rickie Weeks; 7 Eric Young	Outfielders: 27 Brady Clark; 9,22 Jason Conti; 41 Jeffrey Hammonds; 5 Geoff Jenkins; 20 Scott Podsednik; 22 Alex Sánchez; 24 John Vander Wal; Other batters: 29 Mark Smith; 57 Pete Zoccolillo	Manager: 3 Ned Yost; Coaches: 35 Bill Castro (Bullpen); 25 Rich Dauer (bench); 45 Rich Donnelly (third base); 36 Mike Maddux (pitching); 14 Dave Nelson (first base); 16 Butch Wynegar (hitting)

== Players stats ==
=== Batting ===
==== Starters by position ====
Note: Pos = Position; G = Games played; AB = At bats; H = Hits; Avg. = Batting average; HR = Home runs; RBI = Runs batted in

Pos	Player	G	AB	H	Avg.	HR	RBI
C	Eddie Pérez	107	350	95	.271	11	45
1B	Richie Sexson	162	606	165	.272	45	124
2B	Eric Young Sr.	109	404	105	.260	15	31
SS	Royce Clayton	146	483	110	.228	11	39
3B	Wes Helms	134	476	124	.261	23	67
LF	Geoff Jenkins	124	487	144	.296	28	95
CF	Scott Podsednik	154	558	175	.314	9	58
RF	John Vander Wal	117	327	84	.257	14	45

==== Other batters ====
Note: G = Games played; AB = At bats; H = Hits; Avg. = Batting average; HR = Home runs; RBI = Runs batted in

Player	G	AB	H	Avg.	HR	RBI
Keith Ginter	127	358	92	.257	14	44
Brady Clark	128	315	86	.273	6	40
Keith Osik	80	241	60	.249	2	21
Alex Sánchez	43	163	46	.282	0	10
Bill Hall	52	142	37	.261	5	20
Enrique Cruz	60	71	6	.085	0	2
Mark Smith	33	63	15	.238	3	10
Jason Conti	30	48	11	.229	2	7
Jeffrey Hammonds	10	38	6	.158	1	3
Peter Zoccolillo	20	37	4	.108	0	3
Rickie Weeks	7	12	2	.167	0	0

=== Pitching ===
==== Starting pitchers ====
Note: G = Games pitched; IP = Innings pitched; W = Wins; L = Losses; ERA = Earned run average; SO = Strikeouts

Player	G	IP	W	L	ERA	SO
Ben Sheets	34	220.2	11	13	4.45	157
Wayne Franklin	36	194.2	10	13	5.50	116
Matt Kinney	33	190.2	10	13	5.19	152
Wes Obermueller	12	65.2	2	5	5.07	34
Doug Davis	8	52.1	3	2	2.58	35
Rubén Quevedo	9	42.2	1	4	6.75	19
Todd Ritchie	5	28.1	1	2	5.08	15
Luis Martínez	4	16.1	0	3	9.92	10
David Manning	2	6.2	0	2	16.20	2

==== Other pitchers ====
Note: G = Games pitched; IP = Innings pitched; W = Wins; L = Losses; ERA = Earned run average; SO = Strikeouts

Player	G	IP	W	L	ERA	SO
Glendon Rusch	32	123.1	1	12	6.42	93
Dave Burba	17	43.1	1	1	3.53	35

==== Relief pitchers ====
Note: G = Games pitched; W = Wins; L = Losses; SV = Saves; ERA = Earned run average; SO = Strikeouts

Player	G	W	L	SV	ERA	SO
Danny Kolb	37	1	2	21	1.96	39
Luis Vizcaíno	75	4	3	0	6.39	61
Leo Estrella	58	7	3	3	4.36	25
Mike DeJean	58	4	7	18	4.87	58
Valerio De Los Santos	45	3	3	1	4.13	35
Brooks Kieschnick	42	1	1	0	5.26	39
Curt Leskanic	26	4	0	0	2.70	28
Shane Nance	26	0	2	0	4.81	25
Matt Ford	25	0	3	0	4.33	26
John Foster	23	2	0	0	4.71	16
Mike Crudale	9	0	0	0	2.89	7
Jayson Durocher	6	2	0	0	11.05	7

== Farm system ==
The Brewers' farm system consisted of eight minor league affiliates in 2003. The Brewers operated a Venezuelan Summer League team as a co-op with the Cincinnati Reds.

Level	Team	League	Manager
Triple-A	Indianapolis Indians	International League	Cecil Cooper
Double-A	Huntsville Stars	Southern League	Frank Kremblas
Class A-Advanced	High Desert Mavericks	California League	Tim Blackwell
Class A	Beloit Snappers	Midwest League	Don Money
Rookie	Helena Brewers	Pioneer League	Ed Sedar
Rookie	AZL Brewers	Arizona League	Héctor Torres
Rookie	DSL Brewers	Dominican Summer League	—
Rookie	VSL Cagua	Venezuelan Summer League	—
