= 2003 Cincinnati Reds season =

2003 Cincinnati Reds
- League: National League
- Division: Central
- Ballpark: Great American Ball Park
- City: Cincinnati
- Record: 69–93 (.426)
- Divisional place: 5th
- Owners: Carl Lindner
- General managers: Jim Bowden
- Managers: Bob Boone, Ray Knight, Dave Miley
- Television: FSN Ohio (George Grande, Chris Welsh)
- Radio: WLW (Marty Brennaman, Joe Nuxhall)

The 2003 Cincinnati Reds season was the 134th season for the franchise in Major League Baseball, and their first season at Great American Ball Park in Cincinnati. They failed to improve on their 78–84 record from 2002.

== Offseason ==
- November 18, 2002: Ryan Freel was signed as a free agent by the Reds.
- December 15, 2002: Elmer Dessens and cash were traded by the Reds to the Arizona Diamondbacks as part of a 4-team trade. The Toronto Blue Jays sent Felipe López to the Reds. The Diamondbacks sent Erubiel Durazo to the Oakland Athletics. The Athletics sent a player to be named later to the Blue Jays. The Athletics completed the deal by sending Jason Arnold (minors) to the Blue Jays on December 16.
- January 22, 2003: Josías Manzanillo was signed as a free agent with the Cincinnati Reds.

== Regular season ==
=== Season summary ===
The Reds finished in fifth place in their division, nineteen games behind the division winner, the Chicago Cubs. They finished with a record of 69-93 and a winning percentage of .421. The Reds finished eighteen games behind the second place team, the Houston Astros. They finished sixteen games behind the third place team, the St. Louis Cardinals. They finished six games behind the fourth place team, the Pittsburgh Pirates, and one game ahead of the sixth place team, the Milwaukee Brewers.

In the middle of the season, the Reds fired manager Bob Boone and promoted Louisville Bats manager Dave Miley to interim manager.

=== Season standings ===
==== National League Central ====
NL Central
Team	W	L	Pct.	GB	Home	Road
Chicago Cubs	88	74	.543	—	44‍–‍37	44‍–‍37
Houston Astros	87	75	.537	1	48‍–‍33	39‍–‍42
St. Louis Cardinals	85	77	.525	3	48‍–‍33	37‍–‍44
Pittsburgh Pirates	75	87	.463	13	39‍–‍42	36‍–‍45
Cincinnati Reds	69	93	.426	19	35‍–‍46	34‍–‍47
Milwaukee Brewers	68	94	.420	20	31‍–‍50	37‍–‍44

==== Record vs. opponents ====
2003 National League record Source: MLB Standings Grid – 2003
Team	AZ	ATL	CHC	CIN	COL	FLA	HOU	LAD	MIL	MON	NYM	PHI	PIT	SD	SF	STL	AL
Arizona	—	2–5	2–4	7–2	10–9	2–5	5–1	10–9	3–3	4–2	4–2	4–2	3–3	9–10	5–14	3–3	11–4
Atlanta	5–2	—	4–2	3–3	6–0	9–10	5–1	4–2	4–2	12–7	11–8	9–10	7–2	6–1	2–4	4–2	10–5
Chicago	4–2	2–4	—	10–7	3–3	4–2	9–7	2–4	10–6	3–3	5–1	1–5	10–8	4–2	4–2	8–9	9–9
Cincinnati	2–7	3–3	7–10	—	4–2	2–4	5–12	2–4	8–10	2–4	2–4	5–4	5–11	3–3	3–3	9–7	7–5
Colorado	9–10	0–6	3–3	2–4	—	4–2	2–4	7–12	5–1	3–4	2–5	2–4	3–6	12–7	7–12	4–2	9–6
Florida	5–2	10–9	2–4	4–2	2–4	—	1–5	2–5	7–2	13–6	12–7	13–6	2–4	5–1	1–5	3–3	9–6
Houston	1–5	1–5	7–9	12–5	4–2	5–1	—	4–2	9–8	3–3	2–4	2–4	10–6	3–3	2–4	11–7	11–7
Los Angeles	9–10	2–4	4–2	4–2	12–7	5–2	2–4	—	4–2	4–2	3–3	2–5	5–1	8–11	6–13	4–2	11–7
Milwaukee	3–3	2–4	6–10	10–8	1–5	2–7	8–9	2–4	—	0–6	6–3	4–2	10–7	5–1	1–5	3–13	5–7
Montreal	2–4	7–12	3–3	4–2	4–3	6–13	3–3	2–4	6–0	—	14–5	8–11	3–3	4–2	7–0	1–5	9–9
New York	2–4	8–11	1–5	4–2	5–2	7–12	4–2	3–3	3–6	5–14	—	7–12	4–2	3–3	4–2	1–5	5–10
Philadelphia	2–4	10–9	5–1	4–5	4–2	6–13	4–2	5–2	2–4	11–8	12–7	—	2–4	4–3	3–3	4–2	8–7
Pittsburgh	3–3	2–7	8–10	11–5	6–3	4–2	6–10	1–5	7–10	3–3	2–4	4–2	—	4–2	2–4	7–10	5–7
San Diego	10–9	1–6	2–4	3–3	7–12	1–5	3–3	11–8	1–5	2–4	3–3	3–4	2–4	—	5–14	2–4	8–10
San Francisco	14–5	4–2	2–4	3–3	12–7	5–1	4–2	13–6	5–1	0–7	2–4	3–3	4–2	14–5	—	5–1	10–8
St. Louis	3–3	2–4	9–8	7–9	2–4	3–3	7–11	2–4	13–3	5–1	5–1	2–4	10–7	4–2	1–5	—	10–8

=== Notable transactions ===
- July 30, 2003: José Guillén was traded by the Reds to the Oakland Athletics for Aaron Harang, Joe Valentine, and Jeff Bruksch (minors).
- August 24, 2003: Scott Service was signed as a free agent by the Reds.

=== Roster ===
2003 Cincinnati Reds
Roster
Pitchers: 29 José Acevedo; 45 Jimmy Anderson; 51 Jeff Austin; 57 John Bale; 70 Matt Belisle; 71 Juan Cerros; 34 Ryan Dempster; 62 Seth Etherton; 32 Danny Graves; 58 Josh Hall; 54 Joey Hamilton; 39 Aaron Harang; 43 Jimmy Haynes; 49 Félix Heredia; 39 Josías Manzanillo; 50 Kent Mercker; 66 Phil Norton; 65 Scott Randall; 52 Brian Reith; 41 Chris Reitsma; 46 John Riedling; 50 Dan Serafini; 56 Scott Sullivan; 48 Joe Valentine; 45 Todd Van Poppel; 38 Ryan Wagner; 61 Mark Watson; 36 Gabe White; 48 Scott Williamson; 40 Paul Wilson	Catchers: 23 Jason LaRue; 22 Corky Miller; 67 Dane Sardinha; 31 Kelly Stinnett; Infielders: 17 Aaron Boone; 33 Russell Branyan; 21 Sean Casey; 7 Juan Castro; 64 Jim Chamblee; 60 Tim Hummel; 3 D'Angelo Jiménez; 11 Barry Larkin; 16 Brandon Larson; 12,62 Felipe López; 4 Ray Olmedo	Outfielders: 44 Adam Dunn; 6 Ryan Freel; 30 Ken Griffey Jr.; 6 José Guillén; 28 Austin Kearns; 15 Rubén Mateo; 26 Wily Mo Peña; 37 Stephen Smitherman; 63 Dernell Stenson; 19 Reggie Taylor; Other batters: 53 Mark Budzinski; 68 Eric Valent	Manager: 9 Bob Boone; 12 Dave Miley; Coaches: 2 José Cardenal (first base); 10 Tim Foli (third base); 35 Don Gullett (pitching); 47 Tom Hume (bullpen); 25 Ray Knight (bench); 57 Tom Robson (hitting)

== Player stats ==
=== Batting ===
==== Starters by position ====
Note: Pos = Position; G = Games played; AB = At bats; H = Hits; Avg. = Batting average; HR = Home runs; RBI = Runs batted in

Pos	Player	G	AB	H	Avg.	HR	RBI
C	Jason LaRue	118	379	87	.230	16	50
1B	Sean Casey	147	573	167	.291	14	80
2B	D'Angelo Jiménez	73	290	84	.290	7	31
SS	Barry Larkin	70	241	68	.282	2	18
3B	Aaron Boone	106	403	110	.273	18	65
LF	Adam Dunn	116	381	82	.215	27	57
CF	Ken Griffey Jr.	53	166	41	.247	13	26
RF	José Guillén	91	315	106	.337	23	63

==== Other batters ====
Note: G = Games played; AB = At bats; H = Hits; Avg. = Batting average; HR = Home runs; RBI = Runs batted in

Player	G	AB	H	Avg.	HR	RBI
Juan Castro	113	320	81	.253	9	33
Austin Kearns	82	292	77	.264	15	58
Ray Olmedo	79	230	55	.239	0	17
Rubén Mateo	74	207	50	.242	3	18
Felipe López	59	197	42	.213	2	13
Kelly Stinnett	60	179	41	.229	3	19
Russell Branyan	74	176	38	.216	9	26
Wily Mo Peña	80	165	36	.218	5	16
Ryan Freel	43	137	39	.285	4	12
Reggie Taylor	100	130	39	.217	5	19
Brandon Larson	32	89	9	.101	1	9
Tim Hummel	26	84	19	.226	2	10
Dernell Stenson	37	81	20	.247	3	13
Stephen Smitherman	21	44	7	.159	1	6
Eric Valent	18	42	9	.214	0	1
Corky Miller	14	30	8	.267	0	1
Mark Budzinski	4	7	0	.000	0	0
Dane Sardinha	1	2	0	.000	0	0
Jim Chamblee	2	2	0	.000	0	0

=== Pitching ===
==== Starting pitchers ====
Note: G = Games pitched; IP = Innings pitched; W = Wins; L = Losses; ERA = Earned run average; SO = Strikeouts

Player	G	IP	W	L	ERA	SO
Danny Graves	30	169.0	4	15	5.33	60
Paul Wilson	28	166.2	8	10	4.64	93
Ryan Dempster	22	115.2	3	7	6.54	84
Jimmy Haynes	18	94.1	2	12	6.30	49
John Bale	10	46.1	1	2	4.47	37
Aaron Harang	9	46.0	4	3	5.28	26
Jimmy Anderson	8	38.2	1	5	8.84	13
Seth Etherton	7	30.0	2	4	6.90	17
Jeff Austin	7	28.1	2	3	8.58	22
José Acevedo	5	27.0	2	0	2.67	23
Josh Hall	6	24.2	0	2	6.57	18

==== Other pitchers ====
Note: G = Games pitched; IP = Innings pitched; W = Wins; L = Losses; ERA = Earned run average; SO = Strikeouts

Player	G	IP	W	L	ERA	SO
Todd Van Poppel	9	35.2	2	1	4.54	25
Dan Serafini	10	30.0	1	3	5.40	13

==== Relief pitchers ====
Note: G = Games pitched; W = Wins; L = Losses; SV = Saves; ERA = Earned run average; SO = Strikeouts

Player	G	W	L	SV	ERA	SO
Scott Williamson	42	5	3	21	3.19	53
Chris Reitsma	57	9	5	12	4.29	53
Félix Heredia	57	5	2	1	3.00	41
John Riedling	55	2	3	1	4.90	65
Scott Sullivan	50	6	0	0	3.62	43
Kent Mercker	49	0	2	0	2.35	41
Brian Reith	42	2	3	1	4.11	39
Gabe White	34	3	0	0	3.93	23
Ryan Wagner	17	2	0	0	1.66	25
Phil Norton	17	0	0	0	2.45	7
Scott Randall	15	2	5	0	6.51	25
Juan Cerros	11	0	0	0	4.85	9
Josías Manzanillo	9	0	2	0	12.66	7
Matt Belisle	6	1	1	0	5.19	6
Joey Hamilton	3	0	0	0	12.66	7
Joe Valentine	2	0	0	0	18.00	1
Mark Watson	2	0	0	0	4.50	2

== Farm system ==
Level	Team	League	Manager
AAA	Louisville Bats	International League	Dave Miley and Rick Burleson
AA	Chattanooga Lookouts	Southern League	Phillip Wellman
A	Potomac Cannons	Carolina League	Jayhawk Owens
A	Dayton Dragons	Midwest League	Donnie Scott
Rookie	GCL Reds	Gulf Coast League	Edgar Caceres
Rookie	Billings Mustangs	Pioneer League	Rick Burleson and Jay Sorg

LEAGUE CHAMPIONS: Billings
