= 2000 Houston Astros season =

39th season in Major League Baseball for the Houston Astros

2000 Houston Astros
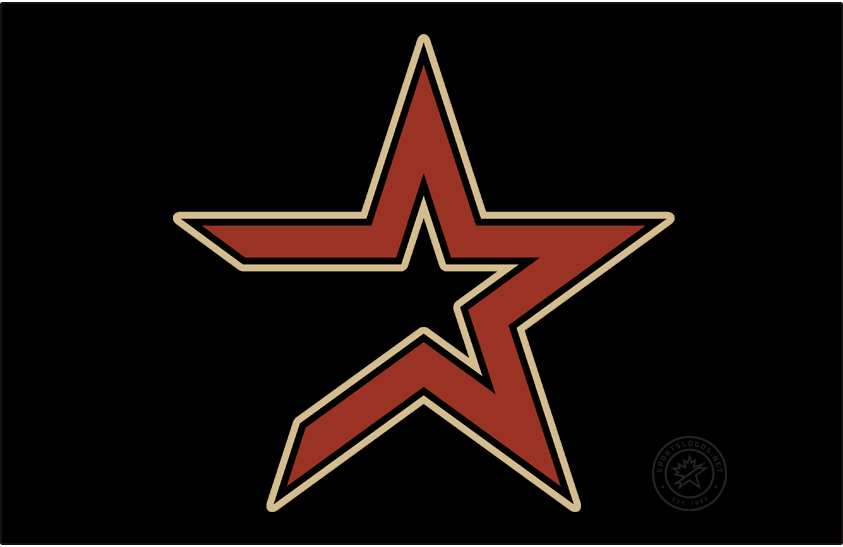
- League: National League
- Division: Central
- Ballpark: Enron Field
- City: Houston, Texas
- Record: 72–90 (.444)
- Divisional place: 4th
- Owners: Drayton McLane, Jr.
- General managers: Gerry Hunsicker
- Managers: Larry Dierker
- Television: KNWS-TV; FSN Southwest (Bill Brown, Jim Deshaies, Bill Worrell)
- Radio: KTRH (Milo Hamilton, Alan Ashby); KXYZ (Francisco Ernesto Ruiz, Alex Treviño)

The 2000 Houston Astros season was the 39th season for the Major League Baseball (MLB) franchise located in Houston, Texas, their 36th as the Astros, 39th in the National League (NL), seventh in the NL Central division, and first at Enron Field, later christened as Minute Maid Park. The Astros entered the season as three-time defending NL Central champions with a 97–65 record in their final season at The Astrodome. However, their season ended in a 3-games-to-1 defeat by the Atlanta Braves in the 1999 National League Division Series (NLDS), also the NL pennant winners.

The season commenced for the Astros on April 4 at Three Rivers Stadium, where pitcher Shane Reynolds made his fifth of five consecutive Opening Day starts for the Astros, who defeated the Pittsburgh Pirates, 5–2. The Astros hosted the Philadelphia Phillies on April 7 for the first regular season game played at Enron Field, but lost, 4–1. In the amateur draft, their first round selection was right-handed pitcher Robert Stiehl, at 27th overall, and in the second round, right-hander Chad Qualls.

Reynolds also represented the Astros at the MLB All-Star Game and played for the National League, his only career selection. On August 19, first baseman Jeff Bagwell connected for his 300th home run, becoming the 87th major leaguer to reach the milestone. On September 12, Richard Hidalgo became the 11th major leaguer to log an extra-base hit in 10 consecutive games.

With a 72–90 finish in fourth place and 23 games behind the division-champion St. Louis Cardinals, it ended eight consecutive seasons with a record of .500 or better, and seven consecutive winning seasons, both the longest runs in franchise history. Between 1992 and 2008, Houston's only other regular season record below .500 occurred in 2007.

In spite of the downturn of 25 wins from the season prior, a number franchise records records fell during the inaugural season of Enron Field, including both in runs scored (938) and runs allowed (944), home runs hit (249) and attendance, among others. For the first time in Astros history, fans surpassed 3 million in attendance at 3.056,139, and the team exceeded the 900-run threshold in either category. The 249 home runs hit also established an NL record, which stood until 2019, when it was eclipsed by the Los Angeles Dodgers.

== Offseason ==
=== Summary ===
The Houston Astros concluded the 1999 season with a 97–65 (.599) record and NL Central division champions, while having played their final game at the Astrodome after 35 seasons. This Astros team established then-club records with 168 home runs and 728 bases on balls, and scored 823 runs which, at the time, had ranked second to the 1998 squad (856). They also set a then all-time team attendance record for a second successive campaign, at 2,706,017.

First baseman Jeff Bagwell slugged 42 home runs and stole 30 bases to become a repeat entrant into the 30–30 club, following 1997 campaign. Second baseman Craig Biggio became the first Major League since George Kell (Detroit Tigers) in 1950 to amass 56 or more doubles, and twelfth overall. (Note: For single seasons, in the regular season, requiring doubles ≥ 56, sorted by ascending season.) Southpaw Mike Hampton and righty José Lima became Houston's first 20-game winner duo during the same campaign, while Hampton was recognized with The Sporting News NL Pitcher of the Year. (Note: From its inception in 1944 until 2012, The Sporting News recognized one pitcher each from the NL and the American League (AL) for this award. Beginning in 2013, the award was redesignated to recognize one starting pitcher and relief pitcher from each league.) Moreover, Bagwell and Hampton both won Silver Slugger Awards, while closer Billy Wagner won the Rolaids Relief Man Award.

Having consummated their final contest as tenants of the Astrodome, Houston would experience play in not one, but two, stadiums for the first time prior to Opening Day in 2000.

==== International play ====
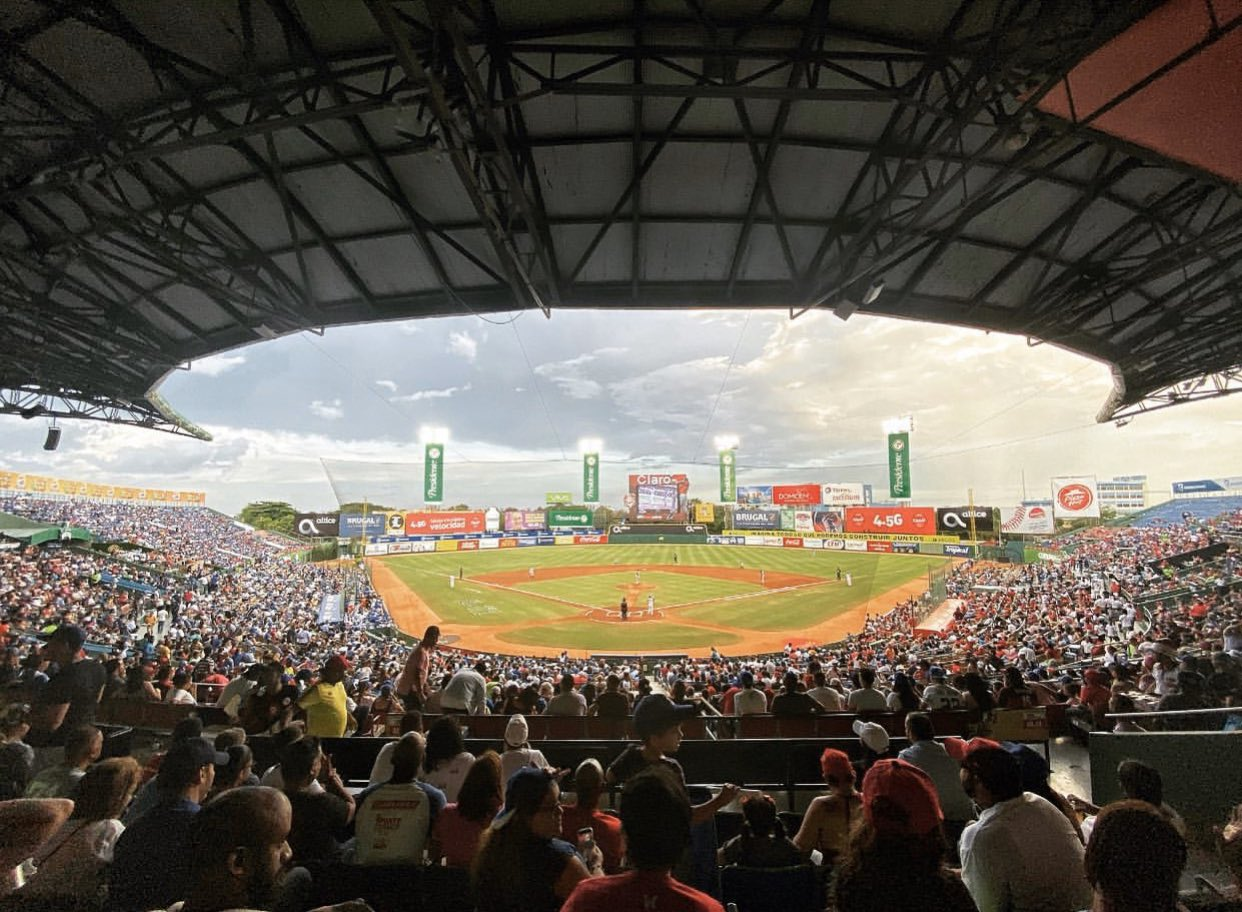
THe Houston Astros played at Estadio Quisqueya Juan Marichal to participate in the first MLB game in the Dominican Republic.

For the first time, Major League Baseball expanded their presence of game play into the Dominican Republic, showcasing the Astros versus the Boston Red Sox. On March 11, Houston dropped Boston, 4–3, at Estadio Quisqueya in Santo Domingo. Jeff Bagwell scalded two home runs to pace the Houston victory. The next day, native-born right-hander José Lima thrilled his countrymen to lead a 3–2 Astros triumph.

On March 12, two gunmen robbed six Astros minor leaguers at a motel in Kissimmee, Florida. One of the perpetrators was apprehended at the scene while the other jumped out the window from the second storey to flee. One of the players suffered bite wounds to the neck.

==== Exhibition opening game at Enron Field ====
In accordance with the manner that the Astros opened play for the first time at the Astrodome in 1965, they hosted the defending World Series-champion New York Yankees in an exhibition contest for the inaugural game at Enron Field on March 30, 2000, with over 40,000 fans in attendance. Hall of Famer Nolan Ryan threw out the ceremonial first pitch, while Dwight Gooden, who made his major league debut at the Astrodome as a New York Met, was the starting pitcher for Houston. Roger Clemens, a future Astro, was the starting pitcher for the Yankees. In the bottom of the first inning, Jeff Bagwell singled for the first hit at the stadium. Gooden lasted 5 innings for Houston. Ricky Ledee, who pinch hit for Clemens, hit the first home run at Enron. In the eighth inning, Houston scored four to rally for the win, capped by Daryle Ward's home run, the first for an Astros player at Enron. The Astros won, 6–5, as closer Billy Wagner registered two strikeouts for the save.

Two years later, with the corporation Enron embroiled in legal controversy, bankruptcy and eventual collapse, the Astros bought out their contract with Enron for $2.1 million. Minute Maid, headquartered in nearby Sugar Land, purchased the naming rights to the stadium during the 2002 season.

=== Transactions ===
- December 13, 1999: Johan Santana was drafted from the Astros by the Florida Marlins in the 1999 rule 5 draft.
- December 14, 1999: Traded outfielder Carl Everett to the Boston Red Sox for shortstop Adam Everett (minors).
- December 23, 1999: Traded outfielder Derek Bell and left-handed pitcher Mike Hampton to the New York Mets for outfielder Roger Cedeño, right-handed pitcher Octavio Dotel, and minor league left-handed pitcher Kyle Kessel.
- January 6, 2000: Signed free agent pitcher Dwight Gooden.

== Regular season ==
=== Summary ===
==== Early April ====
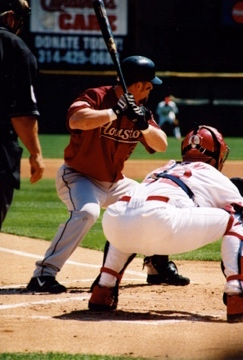
Jeff Bagwell in pre-pitch stance in the batter's box

Opening Day starting lineup
Uniform	Player	Position	Starts
7	Craig Biggio	Second baseman	12
28	Bill Spiers	Left fielder	1
5	Jeff Bagwell	First baseman	10
11	Ken Caminiti	Third baseman	8
18	Moisés Alou	Right fielder	2
20	Tony Eusebio	Catcher	2
15	Richard Hidalgo	Center fielder	3
27	Tim Bogar	Shortstop	1
37	Shane Reynolds	Pitcher	5
Venue: Three Rivers Stadium • Final: Houston 5, Pittsburgh 2

During the regular season Opening Day at Three Rivers Stadium on April 4, center fielder Richard Hidalgo connected for the first grand slam on an Opening Day in franchise history to cap a 5–2 victory over the Pittsburgh Pirates. Hidalgo connected for the historic drive in the seventh off Pittsburgh's Opening Day starter, Jason Schmidt. Astros hitters also coaxed six bases on balls from Schmidt (0–1) as he surrendered each of the five Astros runs, who were all driven in by Hidalgo. Meanwhile Astros starter Shane Reynolds (1–0) tossed seven strong innings to earn the win in his fifth consecutive Opening Day start. Doug Henry followed and pitched a shutout eighth to earn the hold, and Wagner recorded his first official save of the season with a scoreless ninth. Hidalgo's slam was the only home run of this type during his major league career. This was the final MLB Opening Day hosted at Three Rivers Stadium; in 2001, the Pirates moved to PNC Park.

A number of Opening Day milestones were realized. Craig Biggio extended his club-record 12th opening day start, including the ninth as the second baseman, following his first three as catcher, also his 1,700th career game in the lineup. Biggio passed José Cruz for most Opening Day starts, who made 11 through the 1987 campaign. Jeff Bagwell made his 10th Opening Day start to become the fourth Astro to do so, also joining César Cedeño (1981), as well as extending his all-time club lead at first base. Meanwhile, Ken Caminiti's eighth start broke the club record for third basemen, jointly held by Bob Aspromonte, who started each of the first seven in club history (1962 to 1968), and Doug Rader, who started each of the following seven (1969 to 1975). Meanwhile, Reynolds' five Opening Day starts tied him with J. R. Richard and Mike Scott for most by an Astros pitcher, until the record was broken by Roy Oswalt, who logged eight consecutive (2003 to 2010).

The following day, April 5, Biggio opened a career-best 16-game hitting streak. He slashed .313 / .429 / .438 /.866 and accrued three stolen bases during that stretch.

==== Inaugural game at Enron Field ====
Like the regular season home opener of the Astrodome in 1965 when Houston hosted the Philadelphia Phillies, the Astros hosted Philadelphia on April 7 for the first regular season game at Enron Field and 2000 home opener. Octavio Dotel was the starting pitcher for the Astros, while the Phillies countered with Randy Wolf. Phillies center fielder Doug Glanville collected both of the first at bat and first hit in regular season play at Enron Field, while Scott Rolen connected in the top of the seventh off Dotel for the first home run. Second baseman Craig Biggio led off the bottom half of the first with a single to center field for the Astros' first regular season base hit in their new stadium, and in the seventh, Hidalgo connected off Wolf for the first Astros home run at Enron. Philadelphia won, 4–1. Wolf (1–0) was the winning pitcher while Dotel (0–1) took the loss.

==== Rest of April ====
On April 11, Thomas Howard of the St. Louis Cardinals crushed the first-ever grand slam at Enron. Hit during the seventh inning off Chris Holt, Howard's drive was instrumental in securing a 10–6 win for St. Louis, who exploded for seven runs total in the seventh. It was St. Louis' 7th win of 8 games to start the campaign, while the Astros dropped to 3–5.

On April 14 at Qualcomm Stadium, Reynolds worked five innings, allowed 10 hits, one walk, three runs and struck out three. He helped out his own cause in the fifth inning with by connecting for his fourth career home run, a solo shot that tied the score at 3–3. During the sixth, Bagwell took southpaw Kevin Walker deep for his third career grand slam. Moisés Alou also slugged his fourth home run.

From April 27—May 14, Moisés Alou was on the disabled list (DL) with a right calf strain.

Chris Holt fired a one-hit shutout of the Milwaukee Brewers on April 28, while Bagwell, Hidalgo and Ward all backed him with long balls. A second-inning single by Ron Belliard became Milwaukee's only team hit in Holt's brilliant performance, the only one-hitter of his career. Astros hitters worked 11 walks. Holt earned a game score of 86.

On April 29, the Astros drew another 14 bases on balls, which set a club record for a nine-inning game. They defeated Milwaukee, 10 to 3. (Note: Surpassed 12 (twice), on June 27, 1969, and September 5, 1979. Criteria: For single games, from 1898 to 2026, for HOU, in the regular season, sorted by descending bases on balls.)

For the month of April, Reynolds sported a 4–0 record and 3.35 earned run average (ERA) over 37 2/3 innings pitched (IP).

==== May ====
On May 7, Roger Cedeño's three-run home run capped a seven-run tenth inning that sunk the Los Angeles Dodgers, 14-8. Rookie Mitch Meluskey connected for five hits while Ken Caminiti and Hidalgo added deep blasts.

At Coors Field on May 8, Biggio hit second in the batting order for the first time since September 29, 1996, breaking a string of 497 starts as Houston's leadoff hitter. The following game, May 9, Biggio collected a season-high four runs batted in (RBI) versus the Colorado Rockies. In the bottom of the fifth, Caminiti drilled a Scott Karl offering for a grand slam to deep left field, slicing the Astros' deficit to 7–6. The drive was Caminiti's sixth career grand slam and third in an Astros uniform. The next frame, Biggio lined a bases-clearing triple deep to left-center field, giving the Astros the lead for good, 9–7. inning to lead a 13–8 come-from-behind win over Rockies.

On May 27 versus the Atlanta Braves, Reynolds took his first loss of the year, snapping a five-game winning streak which had tied a career high. That game also ended a string of 16 IP for Reynolds without having surrendered any bases on balls, starting May 16.

Holt tied his career high with eight strikeouts on May 28.

==== June—July ====
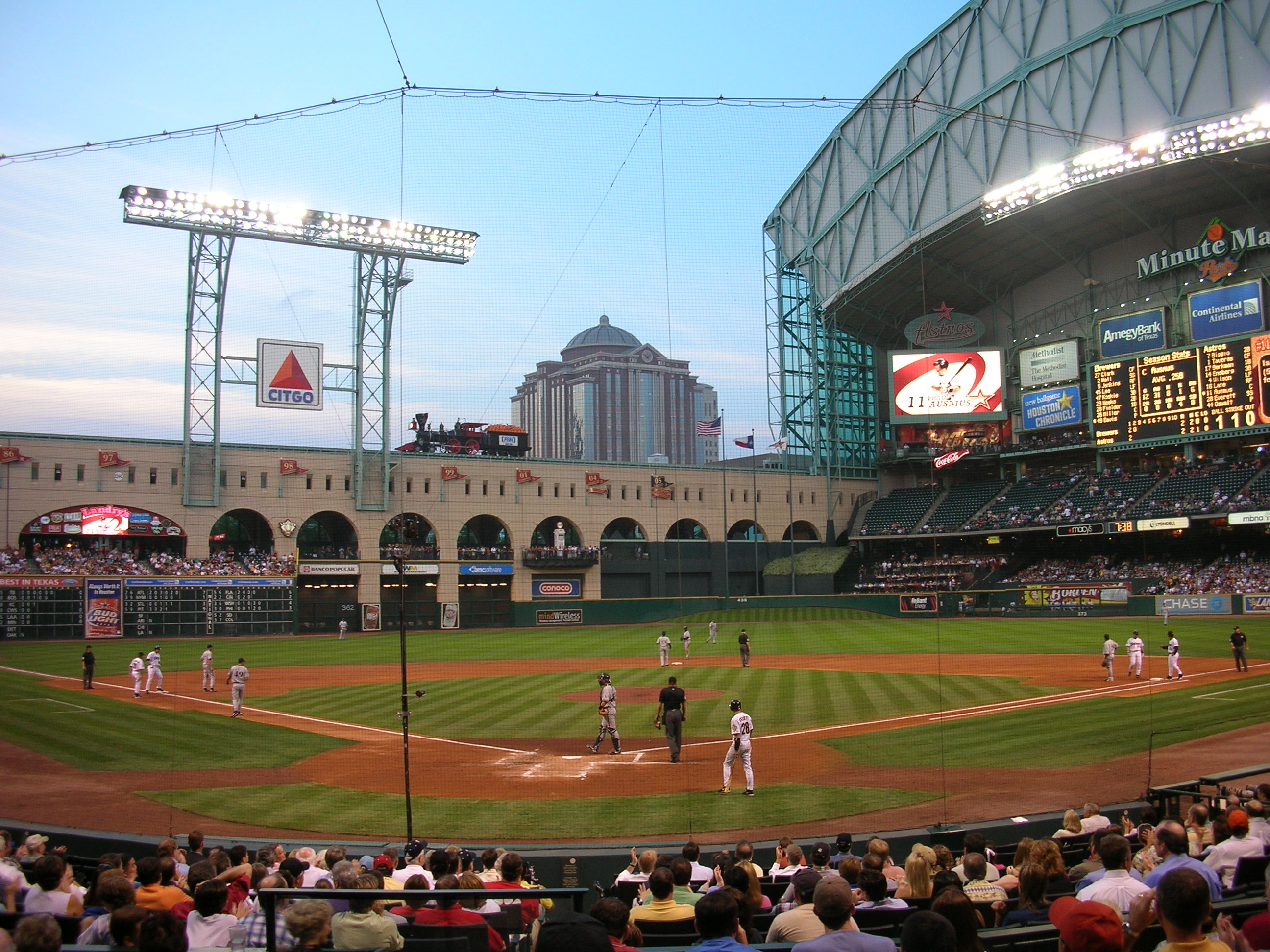
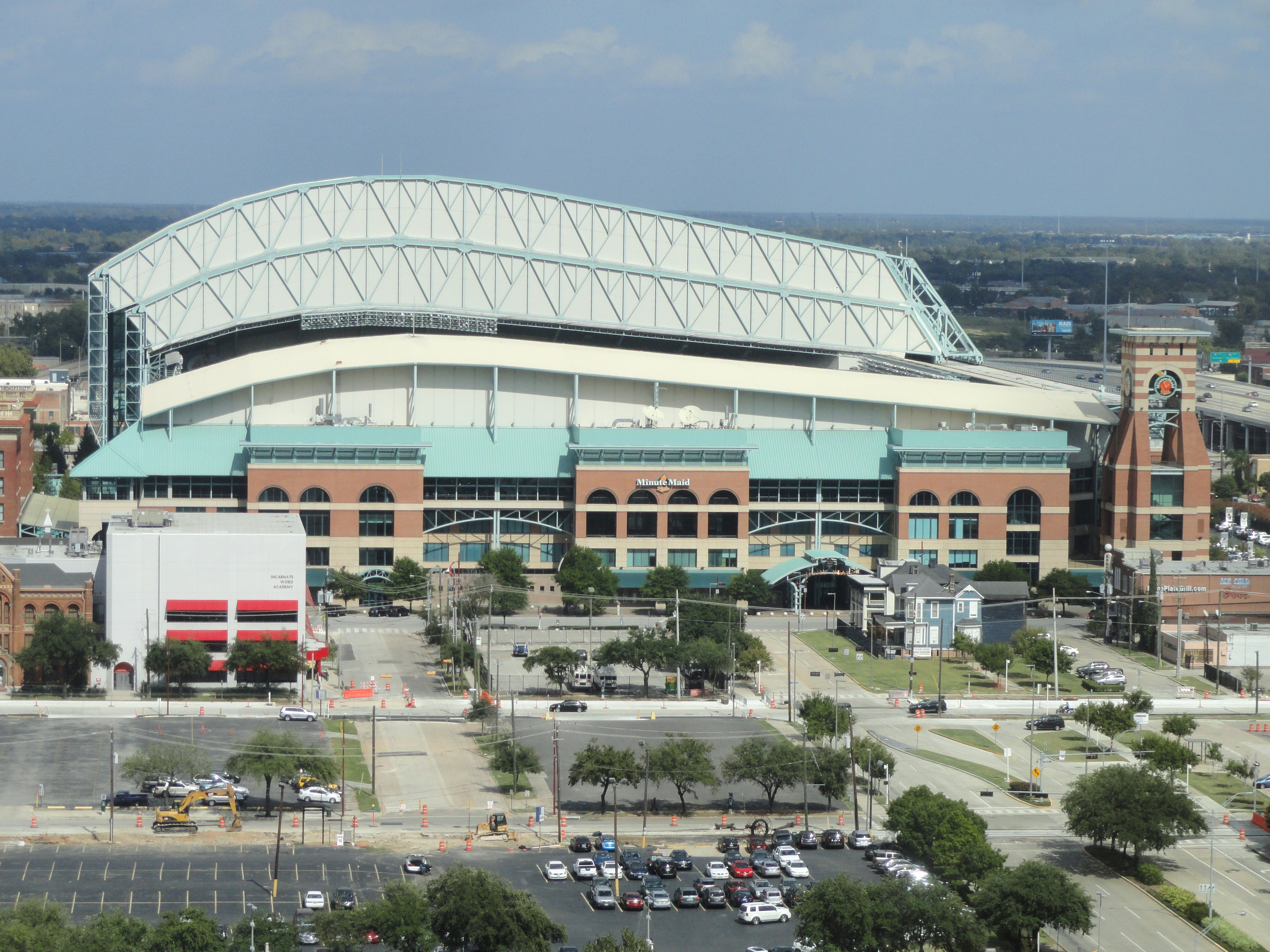
Enron Field interior, roof open (left), and exterior (right).

The Astros hit five home runs on June 14 to power an 8–4 win over Colorado, including back-to-back-to-back home runs from Alou, Hidalgo, and Tony Eusebio. It was Alou's second of the evening. Meanwhile, Bagwell also homered.

At Pacific Bell Park on June 16, Biggio registered his 6.630th at bat during a contest versus the San Francisco Giants to surpass José Cruz for most in franchise history.

Wagner was placed on the 15-day DL on June 21 due to a flexor tendon strain in his left elbow and would require season-ending surgery. His velocity notably reduced, Wagner was 2–4 with a 6.18 earned run average (ERA) over 28 games. The Astros recalled right-hander José Cabrera from the AAA New Orleans Zeyphers.

On June 26 at Arizona Diamondbacks, Biggio singled for his 1,938th hit to pass Cruz for most in franchise history.

Starting July 9, Eusebio authored a 24-game hitting streak to set a club record, surpassing the record of 23-games shared by Art Howe in 1981 and by Luis Gonzalez in 1997. That July 9 game, Lima halted a 13-game personal losing streak during a 9–6 victory over the Kansas City Royals. Lance Berkman homered twice, Alou homered and Bill Spiers doubled twice and tripled.

However, Eusebio's streak was unusual in that, as a backup catcher and pinch hitter it spanned 54 days, ending on August 28. The fifth longest by a catcher since 1900, he batted .409 during the streak, raising his on-base plus slugging percentage (OPS) from .643 to .809. It stood as the Astros' club record until 2004 when it was broken by Jeff Kent.

==== MLB All-Star Game ====
Reynolds, an Astros' five-time Opening Day starter, received his only career MLB All-Star selection, held at Turner Field, and was also the Astros' lone representative. He had already turned in a number of quality seasons, including 70–53 W–L with a 3.73 ERA over the previous five years while leading the pitching staff on three NL Central division title winners. In 2000, the batting order featured multiple viable candidates with copious offensive output; however, only Reynolds gained selection. As of the All-Star break, he was 6–6 with a 4.59 ERA; meanwhile, the Astros were 30–57 (.345) and 21 games behind in the division.

A second Astro narrowly missed the opportunity to join Reynolds as an All-Star: After being struck on the head by an errant fastball from Clemens on July 8, Mike Piazza had to forego the contest. To replace Piazza, NL manager Bobby Cox sought Astros' rookie catcher Mitch Meluskey. However, Cox was unable to contact Meluskey, who was vacationing on South Padre Island; instead, he chose the Cubs' Joe Girardi to replace Piazza.

==== Rest of July ====
At Jacobs Field on July 18 to deal to the Cleveland Indians, Reynolds surrendered a career-high six walks and season-high eight earned runs.

On July 23, Spiers' signature game powered a 15–7 rout of the St. Louis Cardinals. He collected six RBI via two of his team's six homers—the first for two runs in the second inning and his third career grand slam in the seventh. The six home runs tied the club record. Cardinals starter Andy Benes, who surrendered four of the longballs, became just the 17th major leaguer to do so one game. The grand slam was the third of Spiers' career. Meanwhile, Reynolds bounced back from a tough start against the Indians to work 6 2/3 innings and earn the win.

In a start at Turner Field on July 29, Reynolds completed just one inning versus Atlanta in what would be his final start of the year. He was placed on the DL the following day due to back pain.

For the month of July, Alou hit .371 with 6 HRs and 20 RBI.

==== August ====
While attempting to turn a double play on August 1, Biggio was injured in a collision with Preston Wilson of the Florida Marlins, leaving the game with a severe knee injury. Imaging later revealed tears of both the anterior cruciate and medial collateral ligaments of the left knee, which needed surgery and would rule him out for the rest of the season. For Houston, Scott Elarton pitched 8 1/3 solid innings, and Alou drove in Biggio prior to the injury, and Bagwell, for the game-winning RBIs and 4–3 final. This was the first time in his major league career that Biggio had landed on the DL, spanning 13 seasons and 1,800 games played.

From August 2–20, Bagwell constructed an 18-game hitting steak, which tied his career high set in 1994. (Note: During the 2000 season, Bagwell also put together three other hitting streaks of 10 games or more.)

On August 6, Scott Elarton (12–4) tossed his first complete game of the season, while leading a four-hit, 8–1 triumph over the Montreal Expos. Third baseman Chris Truby connected for a tie-breaking grand slam in the third inning, the first grand slam of Truby's career, while establishing a career-high six RBI. Including two starts—one against the Florida Marlins on August 1—Elarton won both, and logged 17 1/3 innings pitched while yielding 10 hits and four runs for a 2.08 earned run average (ERA), .200 batting average against (BAA), and mean game score of 71. For the week ended August 6, Elarton was recognized as National League (NL) Player of the Week.

Bagwell homered twice on August 10 for the record-tying, and recording-breaking, blasts for the club record for team home runs in a single season. During the bottom of the first, Bagwell took Bobby J. Jones deep for the Astros' 168th home run of the season, tying the record set just the year before. In the bottom of the fourth inning, Bagwell connected off Jones a second time for Houston's record-setting and 169th blast. The Astros, in spite of getting 12 hits—including five doubles—were just 1-for-12 with runners in scoring position, dropping a 10–3 bout to the Mets. Mike Piazza and Robin Ventura collected four RBI each, while Piazza also had four hits.

On August 13 at Philadelphia, Bagwell homered twice and tied a club record with seven RBI in a 14–7 win, (Note: Previously accomplished by Rafael Ramírez (August 29, 1988) and Pete Incaviglia (June 14, 1992).) Alou also homered twice, and Hidalgo and Chris Truby also went deep for Houston, who matched the club record with six home runs. This was also the third time of the season the Astros had six home runs in one game.

On August 14 at Pittsburgh, Alou cranked a second successive mutlti-home run game to tie a club record. Over the two games, he was 6-for-9 with 8 RBI.

Bagwell again homered twice on August 19 against the Brewers for the 299th and 300th of his career; the second home run broke an eighth-inning tie to give Houston a 10–8 win. He joined Hank Aaron, Joe DiMaggio, Frank Robinson and Ted Williams as the fifth player in major league history to record 300 home runs, 1,000 RBI and 1,000 runs scored within his first ten seasons. Bagwell became the 87th player to reach the 300-home run plateau.

In August, Alou hit .385 with 9 home runs and 26 RBI.

==== September—October ====
In 10 straight contests from September 3 to 12, Richard Hidalgo connected for an extra-base hit to establish a franchise record. He hit 9 doubles, 1 triple, 5 home runs and 17 RBI, with a slash line of .512 / .511 / 1.146 / 1.657. Hidalgo became the 11th major leaguer to fashion such a stripe of 10 games or longer, and the first since Ken Griffey Jr. of the Seattle Mariners hit in 10 games in a row, July 19–29, 1993. Paul Waner of Pittsburgh (14 in 1927) held the record, which Chipper Jones of Atlanta later equalied in 2006. (Note: Longest streak of consecutive games, in the regular season, requiring extra-base hits ≥ 1, sorted by most games matching criteria.) Hidalgo's franchise-record streak of 10 games was later matched on August 10, 2017, by Alex Bregman.

During a 13–10 win over the Chicago Cubs on September 8, Julio Lugo tied a club record by going 5-for-5 at the plate over 9 innings. The following game, on September 9 also at Wrigley Field, the Astros launched seven home runs against Cubs pitching to set the franchise record, surpassing the 6 they had hit in two separate games just earlier in the season. Tim Bogar collected four hits and five RBI to lead a trio of hitters who each blasted two home runs—including Hidalgo and Lance Berkman—and power a 14–4 rout of the Cubs. Daryle Ward hit the other home run. Lugo, Bagwell, Chris Truby and Frank Charles each doubled as the Astros piled on 19 hits. This date corresponded to another occasion in 2019 in which Houston again erupted for seven home runs against the Oakland Athletics to tie the franchise record.

For the week ended September 10, Hidalgo and Lugo were recognized with co-NL Player of the Week Awards. Over 7 games, Lugo batted .563 / .588 / 1.000, including 18-for-32, three doubles, three home runs, and 8 RBI. He scored 12 runs and stroked 6 multi-hit games to lead Houston on a season-high 6-game winning streak. Hidalgo batted .483, 14-for-29, five doubles, four home runs and 11 runs scored.

Just days after his extra-base hit streak ended, starting September 15, Hidalgo began another similar streak which lasted 7 consecutive games, with 2 doubles and 6 home runs, slashing .586 / .625 / 1.276 / 1.901. Also on September 15, Chris Truby went a single short of hitting for the cycle and plated five runs while Alou drove home four to lead a 16–7 lambasting of Pittsburgh. Right-hander Brian Powell etched the win in relief.

On September 19, Hidalgo blasted his 40th home run of the season off Cardinals starter Pat Hentgen. The first of four consecutive games in which he homered, it represented a season-high for the Astros. Hidalgo's slash line was .563 / .611 / 1.500 / 2.111. (Note: Longest streak of consecutive games, in 2000, playing for HOU, in the regular season, requiring home runs ≥ 1, sorted by most games matching criteria.)

Hidalgo went deep twice on September 22, giving him five home runs in four games. His second home run, off Scott Sullivan during the top of the eighth inning, was the 239th for the Astros, tying them with the 1997 Colorado Rockies for the all-time National League record. (Note: For single seasons, up to 2000, in the NL, in the regular season, sorted by descending home runs.) Berkman then homered off Sullivan in the top of the ninth inning for Houston's record-breaking 240th home run. However, the Reds jumped starter José Lima for seven runs in two innings while outhomering the Astros, 6–3, and winning the contest by a score of 12–5.

Hidalgo concluded the season carrying a 14-game hitting streak, during which he hit .509, 27-for-53, with six homers and 13 RBI. He capped a breakout season with an outstanding September, including hitting safely in 28 of 29 games during the month and logging 102 total bases. Other totals included batting .476 (49-for-103) with 11 homers and 31 RBI. He led the NL with 49 hits, a .971 slugging percentage, .533 on-base percentage, 36 runs scored and 14 doubles. At the time, Hidalgo's 1.486 OPS ranked as second-highest for any month in NL history (to Todd Helton's 1.588 OPS in May earlier this year), and 11th among all major leaguers (.001 points behind Joe DiMaggio in July 1937). (Note: In the regular season, from 1898 to 2000, for any choice in months, requiring on-base plus slugging ≥ 1.400 and plate appearances ≥ 95, sorted by greatest on-base plus slugging.) Further, Hidalgo's batting average ranked among the very highest over any calendar month in major league history and established the Astros franchise record, which stood until Jose Altuve (.485) surpassed this in July 2017. Hence, Hidalgo was recognized with his first career NL Player of the Month Award.

Alou maintained his strong production in the month of September, hitting .330 with 5 home runs and 32 RBI. Over the final three months, he totaled 78 RBI.

The Astros improved their results following the All-Star break, with a record of 42–33 (.560).

==== Performance overview ====
The Astros concluded the regular season at 72–90 (.444), in fourth place of six clubs in the NL Central and 23 games behind (GB) the division-champion St. Louis. This anomalous result interrupted a catenation of three successive NL Central division titles and would be followed by a fourth in a span of five campaigns. Moreover, the 2000 campaign was the Astros' first losing season and furthest from first place that they had finished since 1991 (65–97 (.401) and 29 GB), ending eight consecutive seasons with a record of .500 or better, and seven consecutive winning seasons. Both of those streaks were the longest runs in franchise history. Prior to 2000, Houston had also finished either in first or second place in the NL Central division each year since 1994, its inaugural season, also a franchise record. Overall, between 1992 and 2008, Houston's only other regular season record below .500 occurred in 2007, marking one of the most successful periods in franchise history.

Despite finishing 18 games below .500, the Astros set club records with 249 home runs, 938 runs scored, and 944 runs allowed. During their first season at Enron Field, the Astros drew 3 million fans for the first time in franchise history, with a total of 3.056,139. The 2000 season was also the first time in franchise history that the club had crossed the 900-run threshold, accomplished by both the pitching staff and offense. Their pitching staff surrendered 5.83 runs against per game—highest in the National League—while the offense ranked second (5.79), trailing only the Colorado Rockies in runs scored per game. Hence, the Astros underperformed their Pythagorean expectation 81–81 (.500).

The Astros led the major leagues in home runs hit, slugging percentage (.477) and tied with the Cleveland Indians for the lead in on-base plus slugging (.837 OPS). This set the all-time NL record for most home runs hit by one team during the regular season, (Note: Surpassed the 1997 Colorado Rockies (239).) which stood until September 4, 2019, when surpassed by the Los Angeles Dodgers. One week after the Dodgers broke the NL home run record, the Astros' franchise record fell when George Springer connected for the team's 250th drive of the 2019 season. For the first time in club history, the Astros hit five grand slams each in consecutive seasons, also one under the then-club record six hit in 1989.

Jeff Bagwell hit 47 home runs and scored 152 runs to establish Astros club records, both most recently set in 1997. (Note: Preceded by himself (home runs, 43), and Biggio (runs, 146).) Bagwell hit twenty-eight of the home runs at home to break the club record. (Note: Set by himself (23) at the Astrodome during the strike-shortened 1994 season.) Also leading the major leagues in runs scored, Bagwell's was the highest total in a season since Lou Gehrig in 1936, and with 295 runs total from 1999–2000 established a National League two-season record. Bagwell led the National League in home runs hit at home (28), ranked second both in runs scored (87) and RBI (87), and third in slugging (.720). (Note: In the regular season, in 2000, playing in the NL, home (within Home or Away), requiring PA ≥ 502 over season/career, slugging % for this split.) Bagwell, along with Frank Thomas, became the fourth and fifth major leaguers to bat .300, amass 100 runs, 30 doubles, 40 home runs, 100 RBI, and draw 100 walks, each within two different seasons. (Note: Last accomplished by Bagwell in 1999. The next Astro to accomplish these benchmarks in one season was Yordan Alvarez in 2026. Criteria: Number of seasons player meets criteria, in the regular season, requiring Doubles ≥ 30 and Home Runs ≥ 40 and Runs Batted In ≥ 100 and Batting Average ≥ .300 and Runs ≥ 100 and Bases on Balls ≥ 100, sorted by descending instances.)

At the time, Richard Hidalgo had joined Bagwell as the only players in franchise history to have hit 40 home runs in a single season, and third Venezuelan-born player to reach this milestone, following Tony Armas Sr., and Andrés Galarraga. Hidalgo also became the fourth player in franchise history who posted a single season of at least each of 30 homers, 100 runs scored, and 100 RBI.

Alou posted a .355 batting average, second-highest all-time in franchise history, trailing only Bagwell's .368 average in 1994.

Outfielder Lance Berkman broke the club record for home runs by rookie with 21, overtaking Glenn Davis, who slugged 20 in 1985. (Note: Berkman's record was surpassed by Carlos Correa, who hit 22 in 2015.)

Octavio Dotel, who had opened the campaign in Houston's starting rotation, was shifted to the bullpen to help replace the injured Wagner. With these assignments, Dotel made 15 starts and converted 16 saves, which was first season by an NL hurler to accumulate 15 of both in the same season. This achievement had occurred twice previously in the American League (AL). (Note: The first 15 starts/15 saves season occurred in 1957, when Ray Narleski started 15 games and converted 16 saves with the Cleveland Indians, and in 1999, when Tim Wakefield had 17 starts and attained 15 saves for the Boston Red Sox. In 2004, Dustin Hermanson started 18 and registered 17 saves for the San Francisco Giants.)

=== League standings ===
==== National League Central ====
NL Central
Team	W	L	Pct.	GB	Home	Road
St. Louis Cardinals	95	67	.586	—	50‍–‍31	45‍–‍36
Cincinnati Reds	85	77	.525	10	43‍–‍38	42‍–‍39
Milwaukee Brewers	73	89	.451	22	42‍–‍39	31‍–‍50
Houston Astros	72	90	.444	23	39‍–‍42	33‍–‍48
Pittsburgh Pirates	69	93	.426	26	37‍–‍44	32‍–‍49
Chicago Cubs	65	97	.401	30	38‍–‍43	27‍–‍54

==== Record versus opponents ====
National League

2000 National League record Source: NL Standings Head-to-Head
Team	AZ	ATL	CHC	CIN	COL	FLA	HOU	LAD	MIL	MON	NYM	PHI	PIT	SD	SF	STL	AL
Arizona	—	3–6	5–4	2–5	7–6	4–5	6–1	7–6	4–5	4–5	2–7	8–1	7–2	9–4	6–7	5–4	6–9
Atlanta	6–3	—	4–5	2–5	5–4	6–6	5–4	7–2	6–3	6–7	7–6	8–5	5–2	8–1	6–3	3–4	11–7
Chicago	4–5	5–4	—	4–8	4–5	1–6	5–7	3–6	6–7	4–5	2–5	6–3	3–9	3–5	4–5	3–10	8–7
Cincinnati	5–2	5–2	8–4	—	6–3	3–6	7–5	4–5	5–8–1	6–3	5–4	3–4	7–6	4–5	3–6	7–6	7–8
Colorado	6–7	4–5	5–4	3–6	—	4–5	5–4	4–9	4–5	7–2	3–6	6–3	7–2	7–6	6–7	5–3	6–6
Florida	5–4	6–6	6–1	6–3	5–4	—	3–5	2–7	3–4	7–6	6–6	9–4	5–4	2–7	3–6	3–6	8–9
Houston	1–6	4–5	7–5	5–7	4–5	5–3	—	3–6	7–6	4–5	2–5	5–4	10–3	2–7	1–8	6–6	6–9
Los Angeles	6–7	2–7	6–3	5–4	9–4	7–2	6–3	—	3–4	5–3	4–5	5–4	4–5	8–5	7–5	3–6	6–9
Milwaukee	5–4	3–6	7–6	8–5–1	5–4	4–3	6–7	4–3	—	4–5	2–7	2–5	7–5	2–7	3–6	5–7	6–9
Montreal	5–4	7–6	5–4	3–6	2–7	6–7	5–4	3–5	5–4	—	3–9	5–7	3–4	3–6	3–6	2–5	7–11
New York	7–2	6–7	5–2	4–5	6–3	6–6	5–2	5–4	7–2	9–3	—	6–7	7–2	3–6	3–5	6–3	9–9
Philadelphia	1–8	5–8	3–6	4–3	3–6	4–9	4–5	4–5	5–2	7–5	7–6	—	3–6	2–5	2–7	2–7	9–9
Pittsburgh	2–7	2–5	9–3	6–7	2–7	4–5	3–10	5–4	5–7	4–3	2–7	6–3	—	7–2	2–6	4–8	6–9
San Diego	4–9	1–8	5–3	5–4	6–7	7–2	7–2	5–8	7–2	6–3	6–3	5–2	2–7	—	5–7	0–9	5–10
San Francisco	7–6	3–6	5–4	6–3	7–6	6–3	8–1	5–7	6–3	6–3	5–3	7–2	6–2	7–5	—	5–4	8–7
St. Louis	4–5	4–3	10–3	6–7	3–5	6–3	6–6	6–3	7–5	5–2	3–6	7–2	8–4	9–0	4–5	—	7–8

=== Notable transactions ===
- March 31, 2000: Tony Mounce was released by the Astros.
- April 13, 2000: Dwight Gooden was purchased from the Astros by the Tampa Bay Devil Rays.

=== Roster ===
2000 Houston Astros
Roster
Pitchers: 51 José Cabrera; 41 Octavio Dotel; 50 Scott Elarton; 60 Wayne Franklin; 54 Jason Green; 56 Kip Gross; 19 Doug Henry; 44 Chris Holt; 42 José Lima; 36 Scott Linebrink; 36 Mike Maddux; 59 Tony McKnight; 38 Rusty Meacham; 52 Wade Miller; 46 Yorkis Pérez; 45 Brian Powell; 39 Jay Powell; 37 Shane Reynolds; 58 Joe Slusarski; 16 Marc Valdes; 13 Billy Wagner	Catchers: 6 Paul Bako; 56 Frank Charles; 46 Raúl Chávez; 20 Tony Eusebio; 21 Mitch Meluskey; Infielders: 5 Jeff Bagwell; 7 Craig Biggio; 27 Tim Bogar; 11 Ken Caminiti; 10 Tripp Cromer; 2 Morgan Ensberg; 1 Keith Ginter; 9 Russ Johnson; 68 Julio Lugo; 28 Bill Spiers; 64 Chris Truby	Outfielders: 18 Moisés Alou; 29 Glen Barker; 33 Lance Berkman; 19 Roger Cedeño; 15 Richard Hidalgo; 23 Matt Mieske; 31 Daryle Ward; Other batters: 23 Eddie Zosky	Manager: 49 Larry Dierker; Coaches: 25 José Cruz (first base); 24 Mike Cubbage (third base); 8 Matt Galante (bench); 22 Tom McCraw (hitting); 48 Vern Ruhle (pitching); 30 John Tamargo (bullpen)

== Game log ==
=== Regular season ===
Legend
	Astros win
	Astros loss
	Postponement
	Eliminated from playoff race
**Bold**	Astros team member

2000 regular season game log: 72–90 (Home: 39–42; Away: 33–48)
April: 9–14 (Home: 3–9; Away: 6–5)

#	Date	Time (CT)	Opponent	Score	Win	Loss	Save	Time of Game	Attendance	Record	Box/ Streak

May: 10–19 (Home: 7–6; Away: 3–13)

#	Date	Time (CT)	Opponent	Score	Win	Loss	Save	Time of Game	Attendance	Record	Box/ Streak

June: 8–19 (Home: 3–9; Away: 5–10)

#	Date	Time (CT)	Opponent	Score	Win	Loss	Save	Time of Game	Attendance	Record	Box/ Streak

July: 12–14 (Home: 5–6; Away: 7–8)

#	Date	Time (CT)	Opponent	Score	Win	Loss	Save	Time of Game	Attendance	Record	Box/ Streak
—	July 11	7:35 p.m. CDT	**71st All-Star Game in Atlanta, GA**								

August: 16–12 (Home: 10–6; Away: 6–6)

#	Date	Time (CT)	Opponent	Score	Win	Loss	Save	Time of Game	Attendance	Record	Box/ Streak

September: 16–12 (Home: 10–5; Away: 6–7)

#	Date	Time (CT)	Opponent	Score	Win	Loss	Save	Time of Game	Attendance	Record	Box/ Streak

October: 1–0 (Home: 1–0; Away: 0–0)

#	Date	Time (CT)	Opponent	Score	Win	Loss	Save	Time of Game	Attendance	Record	Box/ Streak

=== Detailed records ===
National League
Opponent	W	L	WP	RS	RA
NL East
Div Total
NL Central
**Houston Astros**					
Div Total
NL West
Div Total
League Total
American League
League Total
Season Total

Month	Games	Won	Lost	Win %	RS	RA
April
May
June
July
August
September
October
Total

	Games	Won	Lost	Win %	RS	RA
Home
Away
Total

== Major League Baseball draft ==
Houston Astros 2000 MLB draft selections
Rd.	Slot	Draftee	Position	School	Origin	Signed	Notes	Bio
1	27	Rob Stiehl	Right-handed pitcher	El Camino	(Louisiana)	Y		
2	67	Chad Qualls	Right-handed pitcher	Nevada	(California)	Y	(Note: MLB debut on July 22, 2004, with Houston)	
3	97	Tony Pluta	Right-handed pitcher	Las Vegas HS	(California)	Y		
4	127	Eric Keefner	Third baseman	De La Salle	(Illinois)	N	(Note: Signed with the Chicago White Sox from the 2002 draft.)	
5	157	Jake Whitesides	Outfielder	Hickman HS	(Missouri)	Y		
6	187	Tony Whiteman	Shortstop	Oklahoma	(Oklahoma)	Y		
15	457	Todd Self	Right-handed pitcher	Louisiana	(Louisiana)	Y	(Note: MLB debut on May 12, 2005, with Houston)	
Sources:

- Round 7 – no. 217: Joey Lydic – 3B • Pittsburgh, (Pennsylvania) • Signed • Career
- Round 8 – no. 247: Cory Doyne –RHP • Land O' Lakes HS • (Florida) • Signed • Career (Note: MLB debut on June 16, 2007, with the Baltimore Orioles)
- Round 9 – no. 277: Eric Bruntlett – SS • Stanford • 2000, Stanford, California • Signed • Career
- Round 10 – no. 307: Nate Nelson– 3B • Louisiana • Lafayette, Louisiana • Signed • Career
- Round 11 – no. 337: Bob McCrory – RHP • Columbus HS, (Mississippi) • Not signed (Note: Signed with the Baltimore Orioles from the 2003 draft.) • Career (Note: MLB debut on April 30, 2008, with Baltimore)
- Round 19 – no. 577: Michael Bourn – OF • Nimitz High School, Houston, TX • Not signed (Note: Signed with the Philadelphia Phillies from the 2003 draft.) • Career (MLB debut: July 30, 2006)
- Round 30 – no. 907: Mike Burns – RHP • Cal State Los Angeles, CA • Signed • Career (Note: MLB debut on May 13, 2005, with Houston)

== Player statistics ==
Table legend
League leader (Bold: MLB leader)	Team leader	*	Left-handed batter or pitcher
League top ten	Leader in appearances at position	#	Switch hitter

Abbreviations key

- ⌖ — primary position
- G — games played
- PA — plate appearances
- AB — at bats
- R — Runs
- H — hits
- 2B — doubles
- HR — home runs
- RBI — runs batted in
- BB — base on balls
- SB — stolen bases
- TB — total bases
- AVG — batting average
- OBP — on-base percentage
- SLG — slugging percentage
- OPS — on-base plus slugging

=== Batting ===
==== Starters by position ====
Individual batting results
⌖	Player	G	AB	R	H	2B	HR	RBI	AVG	OBP	SLG
C	Mitch Meluskey	117	337	47	101	21	14	69	.300	.401	.487
1B	Jeff Bagwell	159	590	**152**	183	37	47	132	.310	.424	.615
2B	Craig Biggio	101	377	61	101	13	8	35	.268	.388	.393
SS	Tim Bogar	110	304	32	63	9	7	33	.207	.292	.319
3B	Chris Truby	78	258	28	67	15	11	59	.260	.295	.477
LF	Daryle Ward*	119	264	36	68	10	20	47	.258	.295	.538
CF	Richard Hidalgo	153	558	118	175	42	44	122	.314	.391	.636
RF	Moisés Alou	126	454	82	161	28	30	114	.355	.416	.623

==== Other batters ====
Individual batting results
Player	G	AB	H	Avg.	HR	RBI
Julio Lugo	116	420	119	.283	10	40
Bill Spiers*	124	355	107	.301	3	43
Lance Berkman^{#}	114	353	105	.297	21	67
Roger Cedeño^{#}	74	259	73	.282	6	26
Tony Eusebio	74	218	61	.280	7	33
Ken Caminiti^{#}	59	208	63	.303	15	45
Matt Mieske	62	81	14	.173	1	5
Glen Barker^{#}	84	67	15	.224	2	6
Russ Johnson	26	45	8	.178	0	3
Raúl Chávez	14	43	11	.256	1	5
Keith Ginter	5	8	2	.250	1	3
Tripp Cromer	9	8	1	.125	0	0
Morgan Ensberg	4	7	2	.286	0	0
Frank Charles	4	7	3	.429	0	2
Eddie Zosky	4	4	0	.000	0	0
Paul Bako*	1	2	0	.000	0	0

=== Pitching ===
==== Starting pitchers ====
Note: G = Games pitched; IP = Innings pitched; W = Wins; L = Losses; ERA = Earned run average; SO = Strikeouts

Individual pitching results
Player	G	IP	W	L	ERA	SO
Chris Holt	34	207.0	8	16	5.35	136
José Lima	33	196.1	7	16	6.65	124
Scott Elarton	30	192.2	17	7	4.81	131
Shane Reynolds	22	131.0	7	8	5.22	93
Wade Miller	16	105.0	6	6	5.14	89
Tony McKnight	6	35.0	4	1	3.86	23
Dwight Gooden	1	4.0	0	0	9.00	1

==== Other pitchers ====
Note: G = Games pitched; IP = Innings pitched; W = Wins; L = Losses; ERA = Earned run average; SO = Strikeouts

Individual pitching results
Player	G	IP	W	L	SV	ERA	SO
Octavio Dotel	50	125.0	3	7	16	5.40	142
Brian Powell	9	31.1	2	1	0	5.74	14
Kip Gross	2	4.1	0	1	0	10.38	3

==== Relief pitchers ====
Note: G = Games pitched; W = Wins; L = Losses; SV = Saves; ERA = Earned run average; SO = Strikeouts

Individual pitching results
Player	G	W	L	SV	ERA	SO
Joe Slusarski	54	2	7	3	4.21	54
Marc Valdes	53	5	5	2	5.08	35
José Cabrera	52	2	3	2	5.92	41
Doug Henry	45	1	3	1	4.42	46
Yorkis Pérez	33	2	1	0	5.16	21
Jay Powell	29	1	1	0	5.67	16
Billy Wagner	28	2	4	6	6.18	28
Wayne Franklin	25	0	0	0	5.48	21
Mike Maddux	21	2	2	0	6.26	17
Jason Green	14	1	1	0	6.62	19
Scott Linebrink	8	0	0	0	4.66	6
Rusty Meacham	5	0	0	0	11.57	3
Tim Bogar	2	0	0	0	4.50	1

== Awards and honors ==
=== Grand slams ===
No.	Date	Astros batter	Venue	Inning	Pitcher	Opposing team	Box
1	April 4 (Note: Opening Day)	Richard Hidalgo (Note: 1st MLB grand slam)	Three Rivers Stadium	6	Jason Schmidt	Pittsburgh Pirates	
2	April 14	Jeff Bagwell	Qualcomm Stadium	6	Kevin Walker	San Diego Padres	
3	May 9	Ken Caminiti	Enron Field	5	Scott Karl	Colorado Rockies	
4	July 23	Bill Spiers	Enron Field	7	Heathcliff Slocumb	St. Louis Cardinals	
5	August 6	Chris Truby	Enron Field	3 (Note: Tied score or took lead)	Mike Thurman	Montreal Expos	

=== Career honors ===
- Radio Hall of Fame inductee—2000: Milo Hamilton

=== Records established ===
NL records established
Predecessor	Achievement	Record-holder	Successor	Ref
	Home runs, single season, team	2000 Houston Astros (249)	2019 Dodgers	
	Runs scored, two-seasons, individual	Jeff Bagwell (295)	Incumbent	

==== Other achievements ====
- Bagwell: 152 runs scored—4th highest in NL history, 10th all-time (Note: The other players preceding Bagwell included Lefty O'Doul (1929), Woody English (1930), Al Simmons (1930) and Chuck Klein (1932).)
  - First NL player—45 HR / 100 RBI / 150 runs scored season (Note: Preceded by Babe Ruth, Joe DiMaggio, Jimmie Foxx and Lou Gehrig in the American League (AL).)

=== Awards ===
2000 Houston Astros award winners
Name of award		Recipient	Ref
Baseball Digest Rookie All-Star	Catcher	Mitch Meluskey	
Fred Hartman Award for Long and Meritorious Service to Baseball		Milo Hamilton	
Houston-Area Major League Player of the Year	NYY	Andy Pettitte	
Houston Astros	Most Valuable Player (MVP)	Jeff Bagwell	
Houston Astros	Pitcher of the Year	Scott Elarton	
Houston Astros	Rookie of the Year	Mitch Meluskey	
MLB All-Star Game	Reserve pitcher	Shane Reynolds	
National League (NL) Player of the Month	September	Richard Hidalgo	
National League (NL) Player of the Week	August 6	Scott Elarton	
National League (NL) Player of the Week	August 13	Jeff Bagwell	
National League (NL) Player of the Week	September 10	Richard Hidalgo	
National League (NL) Player of the Week	September 10	Julio Lugo	

Other awards results

Name of award	Voting recipient(s) (Team)	Ref.
NL Most Valuable Player	1st—Kent (SFG) • 7th—Bagwell (HOU); Other Astros: 20th (tied)—Alou • Hidalgo	
NL Rookie of the Year	1st—Furcal (ATL) • 5th—Meluskey (HOU) • 6th—Berkman (HOU)	

=== League leaders ===
NL batting leaders

- Double plays grounded into: Moisés Alou (21)
- Runs scored: Jeff Bagwell (152—led MLB)

NL pitching leaders

- Earned runs allowed: José Lima (145—led MLB)
- Home runs allowed: José Lima (48—led MLB)

=== Milestones ===
==== Major League debuts ====
Player—Appeared at position

- Julio Lugo, pinch runner
Date and opponent

- April 15 at San Diego
Box

Also:

== Minor league system ==
Level	Team	League	Manager
AAA	New Orleans Zephyrs	Pacific Coast League	Tony Peña
AA	Round Rock Express	Texas League	Jackie Moore
A	Kissimmee Cobras	Florida State League	Manny Acta
A	Michigan Battle Cats	Midwest League	Al Pedrique
A-Short Season	Auburn Doubledays	New York–Penn League	John Massarelli
Rookie	Martinsville Astros	Appalachian League	Brad Wellman

LEAGUE CHAMPIONS: Round Rock, Michigan

Awards

2000 Astros minor league system award winners
Name of award			Recipient	Ref
Baseball America Minor League All-Stars	First Team	Second baseman	Keith Ginter	
Baseball America Minor League All-Stars	First Team	Starting pitcher	Roy Oswalt	
Double-A All-Stars		Second baseman	Keith Ginter	
Double-A All-Stars		Pitcher	Roy Oswalt	
Houston Astros Minor League Player of the Year			Roy Oswalt	
Olympic Games • Sydney (Note: Both participants competed in Houston's minor league system at time of Olympic Games assignment.)		United States (gold)	Adam Everett	
Olympic Games • Sydney		United States (gold)	Roy Oswalt	
Texas League All-Star		Second baseman	Keith Ginter	
Texas League Most Valuable Player Award (MVP)			Keith Ginter	

== See also ==
- List of Major League Baseball annual runs scored leaders
- List of Major League Baseball franchise postseason streaks
- List of Olympic medalists in baseball
