= Smitherman =

Smitherman is a surname. Notable people with the surname include:

- A. J. Smitherman (1883-1961), American journalist
- George Smitherman (born 1964), Canadian politician
- Carole Smitherman (born 1952), American politician, served as City Councilor and Mayor of Birmingham, Alabama
- Rodger Smitherman, American politician, Democratic member of the Alabama Senate
- Christopher Smitherman, American politician, Cincinnati City Council
- Stephen Smitherman (born 1978), American Major League Baseball left fielder
- Joseph T. Smitherman (1929–2005), American politician, Mayor of Selma, Alabama from 1964 to 2000
  - Joseph T. Smitherman Historic Building, a historical building in Selma
