= 2003 Houston Astros season =

2003 Houston Astros
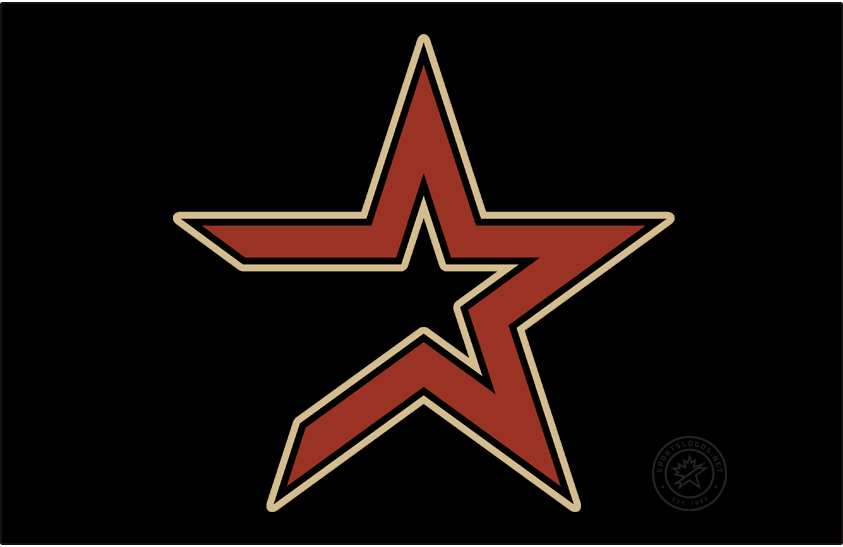
- League: National League
- Division: Central
- Ballpark: Minute Maid Park
- City: Houston, Texas
- Record: 87–75 (.537)
- Divisional place: 2nd
- Owners: Drayton McLane, Jr.
- General managers: Gerry Hunsicker
- Managers: Jimy Williams
- Television: KNWS-TV; FSN Southwest (Bill Brown, Jim Deshaies, Bill Worrell)
- Radio: KTRH (Milo Hamilton, Alan Ashby); KXYZ (Francisco Ernesto Ruiz, Alex Treviño)

The 2003 Houston Astros season was the 42nd season for the Major League Baseball (MLB) franchise located in Houston, Texas, their 39th as the Astros, 42nd in the National League (NL), tenth in the NL Central division, and fourth at Minute Maid Park. The Astros entered the season having finished in second place in the NL Central division with an 84–78 record.

On April 1, pitcher Roy Oswalt made his first of eight consecutive Opening Day starts for the Astros, who hosted Colorado Rockies, and won, 10–4. In the amateur draft, the Astros' top selection was in the second-round with right-handed pitcher Jason Hirsh (59th overall). (Note: Houston forfeited their first round selection to the San Francisco Giants by signing free agent second baseman Jeff Kent.) On April 26, Jeff Bagwell collected his 2,000th career hit, joining teammate Craig Biggio as the second Astro to recood all 2,000 with the team.

On June 11, six Astros pitchers combined to hurl a no-hitter against the New York Yankees, establishing a major league record for most pitchers contributing to a no-hitter. The six were Roy Oswalt, Pete Munro, Kirk Saarloos, Brad Lidge, Octavio Dotel and Billy Wagner. Moreover, Dotel became the first to strike out four batters in one inning during a no-hitter, and the 45th pitcher overall.

Wagner represented the Astros and played for the National League at the MLB All-Star Game, his third career selection. On July 10, Biggio became the 40th major leaguer to reach 500 doubles, while, Bagwell on July 20, hit his 400th career home run, becoming the 35th player in major league history to do so.

The Astros concluded the season with an 87–75 record, runners-up in the NL Central—one game behind the Chicago Cubs and two games ahead of the St. Louis Cardinals—after having led the division most of the season. In the NL Wild Card race, Houston also ranked second, trailing the eventual World Series champion Florida Marlins by 4 games. Hence, the Astros missed the playoffs by one game. This was the 10th winning season in the previous 11 for Houston, and the ninth time in 10 seasons since moving to the NL Central that they had finished in either first or second place.

== Offseason ==
=== Summary ===
The Astros concluded the 2002 campaign with an 84–78 (.519) record, as runners-up in the NL Central division runners-up, 13 games behind the division-champion St. Louis Cardinals. In the NL Wild Card race, he Astros ranked third, trailing the eventual NL-champion San Francisco Giants by 11 1/2 games. This was the fourth time within five seasons that Houston won 84 or more games, an unprecedented feat for the team within any five-year span.

To commemorate the life and humanitarian qualities of former pitcher Darryl Kile, who had died suddenly prior to a game in Chicago on June 22, 2002, the Astros and St. Louis Cardinals—two of Kile's former teams—united to create the "Darryl Kile Good Guy Award." Intended for bestowal upon one Astros and one Cardinals player following each season, its recognition would signify that player exemplifies Kile’s qualities as "a good teammate, a great friend, a fine father and a humble man." During his career, Kile posted a 133-119 win–loss record (W–L) and an earned run average (ERA) of 4.12. Jeff Bagwell became the first recipient for Houston following the 2003 season, while Mike Matheny was the first for St. Louis.

Following its issuance to Kile from 1991–1997, no other Astros have worn the uniform number 57 since.

Outfielder Richard Hidalgo survived a scare and remained largely unharmed during a carjacking attempt on him in Venezuela on November 22, 2002. He had sustained a gunshot wound to his left arm. However, he appeared to have escaped significant injury, without signs either of fracture or ligament damage.

On March 27, 2003, starting rotation mainstay Shane Reynolds was released, surprising Astros veterans. Reynolds was soon thereafter signed by the Atlanta Braves, posting an 11–9 win–loss record for the season.

=== Transactions ===
- October 11, 2002: Declined team option on right-handed pitcher Shane Reynolds.
- December 18, 2002: Signed free agent second baseman Jeff Kent to a 2-year, $18.2 million contract.

== Regular season ==
=== Summary ===
With Houston having signed second baseman Jeff Kent in free agency, franchise stalwart Craig Biggio changed positions for the second time in his career. He served as the club's primary center fielder starting in 2003.

==== April—May ====
Opening Day starting lineup
| Uniform | Player | Position |
|---|---|---|
| 7 | Craig Biggio | Center fielder |
| 27 | Geoff Blum | Third baseman |
| 5 | Jeff Bagwell | First baseman |
| 17 | Lance Berkman | Left fielder |
| 12 | Jeff Kent | Second baseman |
| 15 | Richard Hidalgo | Right fielder |
| 11 | Brad Ausmus | Catcher |
| 4 | Julio Lugo | Shortstop |
| 44 | Roy Oswalt | Pitcher |
Venue: Minute Maid Park • Houston 10, Colorado 4 Sources:

During his first at bat in an Astros uniform on Opening Day, Jeff Kent homered as the Astros downed the Colorado Rockies, 10–4. Jeff Bagwell ripped two home runs, while Geoff Blum also homered and collected three runs batted in (RBI). Starter Roy Oswalt earned the victory.

On April 2, Craig Biggio swatted a single in the bottom of the ninth for his franchise-record tying 13th career walk-off hit. Biggio's hit netted both the game-tying and walk-off runs, stunning Colorado, 8–7. This capped a five-run rally, all in the bottom of the ninth. The Astros mustered four consecutive singles, while Orlando Merced doubled to precede Biggio's heroics. Billy Wagner was the winning pitcher. Biggio tied José Cruz for most walk-off hits in club history.

Catcher Brad Ausmus smoked two home runs on April 4—including a grand slam—to bookend a 6–5, 12-inning triumph over the St. Louis Cardinals. He hit the grand slam in the first inning, while the second homer also provided the go-ahead run in the top of 12th inning. Behind the plate, Ausmus registered three runners caught stealing, including Fernando Viña for the final out of the contest. This was the only multi-homer game of Ausmus' career, while he tied his career-high with 5 RBI. Meanwhile, Brad Lidge earned his first Major League save.

On April 18, Biggio connected for his 200th career home run during the top of the eighth inning. Biggio hit the milestone blast off right-hander Luis Vizcaíno of the Milwaukee Brewers.

During a 3–2 loss to the Montreal Expos on April 26, first baseman Jeff Bagwell hit an infield single for his 2,000th career hit—all as a member of the Astros—joining teammate Craig Biggio as the only players to achieve this feat (May 4, 2001). Bagwell became the third player overall to reach 2,000 hits in Astros uniform, also joining José Cruz (September 15, 1985).

The Astros concluded April with an 11–15 (.423) record.

In the first inning on May 1, Lance Berkman homered off former teammate Shane Reynolds to overtake Ken Caminiti for the club record in home runs among switch hitters.

Following a game at Minute Maid Park on May 1, shortstop Julio Lugo was arrested and charged with assaulting his wife in their vehicle while driving on the Eastex Freeway the evening before. He was then designated for assignment, subsequently cleared waivers, and given an unconditional release by the club.

From May 2 to 8, the Astros set a season-high seven-game winning streak, their first of two this season.

The Astros placed Oswalt on the disabled list (DL) on May 18 due to a right groin strain.

The Astros rebounded to produce an 11–15 (.423) showing during the month of May.

==== June ====
In his return from the DL on June 7, Richard Hidalgo connected for a game-winning three-run home over the Tampa Bay Devil Rays which resulted in a 5–4 score. Part of a 3-hit night, Hidalgo had been hospitalized with tonsillitis just one week prior. Meanwhile, Lance Berkman hit a ballpark-record 464 feet (141 m) home run, and Billy Wagner converted the 199th save of his career to tie a franchise record, first achieved by Dave Smith.

On June 8, Wagner earned his 200th career save against Tampa Bay.

==== Oswalt—Munro—Saarloos—Lidge—Dotel—Wagner combined no-hitter ====
Following an early departure by starter Roy Oswalt due to a groin injury on June 11 at Yankee Stadium, five Astros relievers supervened to toss a no-hitter for the first against the New York Yankees in 45 years. Houston's early access into the bullpen segued into establishing the major league record for most pitchers contributing to such a contest during an 8–0 Astros victory. Succeeding Oswalt from the second inning on, Pete Munro, Kirk Saarloos, Brad Lidge, Octavio Dotel and Wagner each delivered in this historic contest. Lidge (4–0), who worked the sixth and seventh innings, was credited with the win.

In the top of the fourth, Berkman launched a deep blast to right field that also plated Geoff Blum, capping Houston's scoring while mounting a 4–0 advantage. In addition to Berkman's home run, the Astros aggregated five doubles, including two from Hidalgo, and a triple from Orlando Merced.

Dotel assumed the mound for Houston for the eighth frame, which culminated into its own unique event. The right-hander whiffed Juan Rivera on three pitches for the first out. Next, Alfonso Soriano fouled off three consecutive offerings before swinging and missing on a wild pitch bounced in the dirt that eluded catcher Brad Ausmus for an uncaught third strike, acquiescing passage for Soriano to scamper safely to first base. Derek Jeter then coaxed a full count, but struck out swinging, and Dotel retired Jason Giambi with a swing-and-miss on a 2–2 count. Not only did Dotel became the 44th pitcher to sling a major-league record tying four-strikeout inning, but he became the first to do so during a no-hitter.

During top of the opening frame, the Astros lineup leveraged the wild pitch from Yankees starter Jeff Weaver to ignite the scoring. Biggio led the contest off with a double. Blum then flied out deep enough to center field to advance Biggio to third. Next, Bagwell grounded out to the pitcher, and Jeff Kent followed with a walk. With Berkman at the plate, Weaver's wild pitch on a 1–2 count allowed Biggio to score and Kent to go to second, while the Astros assumed a 1–0 advantage. Berkman also grounded out to Weaver to retire the side.

During the bottom of the first, Oswalt retired the Yankees in order, while concluding the frame via successive punchouts of Jeter and Giambi. Oswalt received a game score of 55 for his lone inning of work.

After Merced's triple to left-center in the top of the second, José Vizcaíno lifted a sacrifice fly to center field to bring him home and increase the Astros' lead to 2–0.

Munro, who replaced Oswalt, injected the bulk of the effort for Houston's bullpen. Over 2 2/3 total frames, Munro struck out a pair, while navigating three bases on balls. They were New York's only other batters who reached base besides Soriano: Jeter, Jorge Posada, and Todd Zeile.

Wagner entered in the top of the ninth and proceeded to whiff both Posada and Bubba Trammell, who pinch-hit for Robin Ventura. The southpaw then generated a groundball tapper from Hideki Matsui back to himself, who flipped the ball to Bagwell at first to polish off the masterpiece.

Dotel further became the second Astro to complete the comeback for that fourth strikeout during a single inning, and first since Mike Scott on September 3, 1986, versus the Chicago Cubs. (Note: Just weeks after executing the four-strikeout inning, Scott tossed a no-hitter versus the San Francisco Giants on September 25, 1986.) In all, Astros pitching induced 13 whiffs. during the club's first-ever game in The Bronx.

For Saarloos, this was the second no-hitter to which he had contributed since entering professional baseball. As a member of the Lexington Legends of the South Atlantic League, on July 30, 2001, he closed out a three-man combined effort. It was the first no-hitter in Lexington team history.

This was the first combined no-hit effort in Houston's club history, their tenth overall, and the first occasion in a major-league record 6.980 contests that the Yankees had been no-hit. The previous occurrence was on September 20, 1958, when Hoyt Wilhelm of the Baltimore Orioles hurled a no-hitter that resulted in a 1–0 decision over New York.

The most recent no-hit game by a Houston Astro had been Darryl Kile's gem on September 8, 1993, and the following such outing was posted by Mike Fiers on August 21, 2015.

==== Rest of June ====
Oswalt missed time following that start in The Bronx, and was out of action until 26 days later on July 7, when he surrendered one run in six innings to lead a 7–1 victory over the Cincinnati Reds.

Inserted as a pinch hitter for his first major league plate appearance on June 27, Dave Matranga connected for a home run off Joaquin Benoit in the fifth inning, which tied the game with the Texas Rangers at 4-4. However, Texas later rallied to win this contest, 10–7. Matranga became the first Astros player to hit a home run in his first major league plate appearance since pitcher José Sosa connected off Danny Frisella of the San Diego Padres on July 30, 1975, at the Astrodome. The next Astros player to accomplish this feat was Charlton Jimerson on September 4, 2006, also as pinch hitter, whose drive ended a perfect game bid by Cole Hamels after 5 2/3 innings.

==== July ====
Highlighting a six-run first inning on July 9, shortstop Adam Everett hit his first career grand slam to lead a 12–2 rout of the Cincinnati Reds at Minute Maid Park. Everett also set a career-high 4 RBI on that first-inning swing. Lance Berkman and Hidalgo hit consecutive home runs for Houston, while Gregg Zaun had another. Biggio and Hidalgo collected three hits apiece to lead the Astros. Ken Griffey Jr. connected for his 478th career home run for Cincinnati.

On July 10, Biggio extended his club record with his 500th career double. Biggio became the 40th major leaguer to reach 500 doubles. During this contest, the Astros exploded for a club-record nine runs during the first inning to topple Cincinnati, 9–2. Geoff Blum registered two safeties and two RBI during that momentous first frame. Richard Hidalgo tallied 4 RBI. The triumph expanded the Spacemen's lead to two games in the Central while they sat five games above .500.

==== Jeff Bagwell's 400th home run ====
In another contest versus Cincinnati on July 20, Bagwell hit two home runs for the 400th of his career off Danny Graves, becoming the 35th player in MLB history to do so. The leader in club history since April 21, 1999, Bagwell continued to add to his record. His drive became the highest milestone home hit by an Astros player since Eddie Mathews on July 14, 1967, who connected for his 500th home run at Candlestick Park.

==== August—September ====
On August 6, Everett hit the first-ever inside-the-park home run at Minute Maid Park, one of four Astros home runs against the New York Mets.

ESPN published "The List" on August 20, which profiled and ranked Bagwell and Biggio as the second- and third-most underrated athletes, respectively, of the top four North American professional sports leagues.

Jeff Kent drove in five runs on August 26 to lead a 18–4 rout of the Los Angeles Dodgers, his 18th career game of five or more RBI. This was the club's season-high in runs scored in a single game.

On September 1, Jeff Kent slugged the 100th grand slam in Colt .45s/Astros franchise history. Kent's blast occurred at Dodger Stadium, during the top of the ninth inning off Rodney Myers, and plated Craig Biggio, Geoff Blum, and Jeff Bagwell.

On September 9, Billy Wagner converted his 40th save of the season, becoming the first pitcher in club history to reach the milestone. This surpassed his own club record of 39 saves each in 1999 and 2001. (Note: Tied by José Valverde in 2008. Criteria: For single seasons, playing for HOU, in the regular season, requiring saves ≥ 25, sorted by ascending season.) The southpaw earned the save by tossing a scoreless ninth against the Milwaukee Brewers to finalize a 7–6 victory, including a pair of whiffs.

At Coors Field on September 16, Hidalgo launched three home runs in a single game, becoming the seventh Houston Astro to accomplish the feat. Hidalgo went 3-for-4 with four runs scored and five RBI to lead a 14–4 win over the Colorado Rockies. Hidalgo succeeded Lance Berkman on April 16, 2002, as the seventh Astro to connect for three home runs in a single game. (Note: On May 15, 2005, Morgan Ensberg became the next Astro to hit for a three-home run game.)

==== Performance overview ====
The Astros nearly made the playoffs for the fifth time over seven seasons, in the midst of an unprecedented period of success in franchise history. With an 85–77 record, Houston wound up second in the NL Central division, one game behind the division-champion Chicago Cubs. In the Wild Card race, the Astros trailed the Florida Marlins—that year's eventual World Series champion—by just 4 games, also in second place.

Having scored 805 runs and yielded 677, the club underperformed their Pythagorean expectation of 94–68 (.580).

Though Houston improved by one win from the year prior, it was the second consecutive season missing the playoffs, while missing on consecutive seasons for the first time since 1996. This was also the most games won missing the playoffs since 1993, the year before the Wild Card era. However, the 2003 season continued one of the greatest periods of success, in that it was the third of six consecutive with a winning record, through the 2006 campaign, the second-longest such in club history. They had also agglomerated 84 wins or more in six of each of the seven prior seasons (with 2000 being the exception) and continued to win 84 or more through 2005.

Having soaked the second-most innings pitched (IP) in MLB (581 1/3), this Astros bullpen led the major leagues with 495 strikeouts and surrendered just a .225 batting average against. With the combinatoin of Dotel, Lidge, and Wagner, journalist Buster Olney rated this bullpen as third-finest in his top ten all-time one decade after this season. Only World Series champions 1998 New York Yankees and 1990 Cincinnati Reds fortified by the Nasty Boys preceded this Astros edition.

Hidalgo, who led the major leagues with 22 outfield assists, was recognized with the club's Most Valuable Player (MVP) Award.

Closer Billy Wagner set the Astros' single-season franchise record with a career-high 44 saves, breaking his own club record of 39 (twice, 1999 and 2001).

Astros rookie pitching established record-setting performances in 2003. Starter Jeriome Robertson set a club rookie record with 15 wins, which led all MLB rookies—as well as the Astros' pitching staff—netting him Baseball Digest Rookie All-Star starting pitcher honors. Meanwhile, reliever Brad Lidge, who was the winning pitcher during the Astros' six-man no-hitter on June 11, established a club rookie record for relievers with 97 strikeouts, surpassing Dave Veres' 94 strikeouts during the 1995 campaign. (Note: Surpassed by Chris Devenski (104) in 2016. Criteria: For single seasons, at least 80% games in relief, playing for HOU, a rookie, in the regular season, requiring strikeouts ≥ 65, sorted by ascending season.) Lidge also led rookie relievers in the major leagues in strikeouts. (Note: For single seasons, in 2003, at least 80% games in relief, a rookie, in the regular season, requiring strikeouts ≥ 50, sorted by descending strikeouts.) The Astros' selection in the 1998 MLB draft via the compensation pick (17th overall) granted to Houston as a result of the Colorado Rockies signing the late Darryl Kile, Lidge was the Astros' Rookie of the Year.

=== League standings ===
==== National League Central ====
NL Central
| Team | W | L | Pct. | GB | Home | Road |
|---|---|---|---|---|---|---|
| Chicago Cubs | 88 | 74 | .543 | — | 44‍–‍37 | 44‍–‍37 |
| Houston Astros | 87 | 75 | .537 | 1 | 48‍–‍33 | 39‍–‍42 |
| St. Louis Cardinals | 85 | 77 | .525 | 3 | 48‍–‍33 | 37‍–‍44 |
| Pittsburgh Pirates | 75 | 87 | .463 | 13 | 39‍–‍42 | 36‍–‍45 |
| Cincinnati Reds | 69 | 93 | .426 | 19 | 35‍–‍46 | 34‍–‍47 |
| Milwaukee Brewers | 68 | 94 | .420 | 20 | 31‍–‍50 | 37‍–‍44 |

==== Record versus opponents ====
National League

2003 National League record Source: MLB Standings Grid – 2003
| Team | AZ | ATL | CHC | CIN | COL | FLA | HOU | LAD | MIL | MON | NYM | PHI | PIT | SD | SF | STL | AL |
|---|---|---|---|---|---|---|---|---|---|---|---|---|---|---|---|---|---|
| Arizona | — | 2–5 | 2–4 | 7–2 | 10–9 | 2–5 | 5–1 | 10–9 | 3–3 | 4–2 | 4–2 | 4–2 | 3–3 | 9–10 | 5–14 | 3–3 | 11–4 |
| Atlanta | 5–2 | — | 4–2 | 3–3 | 6–0 | 9–10 | 5–1 | 4–2 | 4–2 | 12–7 | 11–8 | 9–10 | 7–2 | 6–1 | 2–4 | 4–2 | 10–5 |
| Chicago | 4–2 | 2–4 | — | 10–7 | 3–3 | 4–2 | 9–7 | 2–4 | 10–6 | 3–3 | 5–1 | 1–5 | 10–8 | 4–2 | 4–2 | 8–9 | 9–9 |
| Cincinnati | 2–7 | 3–3 | 7–10 | — | 4–2 | 2–4 | 5–12 | 2–4 | 8–10 | 2–4 | 2–4 | 5–4 | 5–11 | 3–3 | 3–3 | 9–7 | 7–5 |
| Colorado | 9–10 | 0–6 | 3–3 | 2–4 | — | 4–2 | 2–4 | 7–12 | 5–1 | 3–4 | 2–5 | 2–4 | 3–6 | 12–7 | 7–12 | 4–2 | 9–6 |
| Florida | 5–2 | 10–9 | 2–4 | 4–2 | 2–4 | — | 1–5 | 2–5 | 7–2 | 13–6 | 12–7 | 13–6 | 2–4 | 5–1 | 1–5 | 3–3 | 9–6 |
| Houston | 1–5 | 1–5 | 7–9 | 12–5 | 4–2 | 5–1 | — | 4–2 | 9–8 | 3–3 | 2–4 | 2–4 | 10–6 | 3–3 | 2–4 | 11–7 | 11–7 |
| Los Angeles | 9–10 | 2–4 | 4–2 | 4–2 | 12–7 | 5–2 | 2–4 | — | 4–2 | 4–2 | 3–3 | 2–5 | 5–1 | 8–11 | 6–13 | 4–2 | 11–7 |
| Milwaukee | 3–3 | 2–4 | 6–10 | 10–8 | 1–5 | 2–7 | 8–9 | 2–4 | — | 0–6 | 6–3 | 4–2 | 10–7 | 5–1 | 1–5 | 3–13 | 5–7 |
| Montreal | 2–4 | 7–12 | 3–3 | 4–2 | 4–3 | 6–13 | 3–3 | 2–4 | 6–0 | — | 14–5 | 8–11 | 3–3 | 4–2 | 7–0 | 1–5 | 9–9 |
| New York | 2–4 | 8–11 | 1–5 | 4–2 | 5–2 | 7–12 | 4–2 | 3–3 | 3–6 | 5–14 | — | 7–12 | 4–2 | 3–3 | 4–2 | 1–5 | 5–10 |
| Philadelphia | 2–4 | 10–9 | 5–1 | 4–5 | 4–2 | 6–13 | 4–2 | 5–2 | 2–4 | 11–8 | 12–7 | — | 2–4 | 4–3 | 3–3 | 4–2 | 8–7 |
| Pittsburgh | 3–3 | 2–7 | 8–10 | 11–5 | 6–3 | 4–2 | 6–10 | 1–5 | 7–10 | 3–3 | 2–4 | 4–2 | — | 4–2 | 2–4 | 7–10 | 5–7 |
| San Diego | 10–9 | 1–6 | 2–4 | 3–3 | 7–12 | 1–5 | 3–3 | 11–8 | 1–5 | 2–4 | 3–3 | 3–4 | 2–4 | — | 5–14 | 2–4 | 8–10 |
| San Francisco | 14–5 | 4–2 | 2–4 | 3–3 | 12–7 | 5–1 | 4–2 | 13–6 | 5–1 | 0–7 | 2–4 | 3–3 | 4–2 | 14–5 | — | 5–1 | 10–8 |
| St. Louis | 3–3 | 2–4 | 9–8 | 7–9 | 2–4 | 3–3 | 7–11 | 2–4 | 13–3 | 5–1 | 5–1 | 2–4 | 10–7 | 4–2 | 1–5 | — | 10–8 |

=== Notable transactions ===
- May 1, 2003: Julio Lugo was designated for assignment, and then released 10 days later after "hitting his wife in the face and slamming her head on a car hood" outside of Minute Maid Park.
- June 3, 2003: Josh Anderson was drafted by the Houston Astros in the 4th round of the 2003 amateur draft. Player signed June 13, 2003.
- August 21, 2003: Gregg Zaun was released by the Houston Astros.

=== Roster ===
2003 Houston Astros
Roster
| Pitchers: 35 Nate Bland; 56 Kirk Bullinger; 31 Bruce Chen; 41 Jared Fernández; 45 Mike Gallo; 41 Jonathan Johnson; 54 Brad Lidge; 36 Scott Linebrink; 58 Dan Miceli; 52 Wade Miller; 39 Brian Moehler; 53 Peter Munro; 44 Roy Oswalt; 59 Brandon Puffer; 51 Tim Redding; 60,62 Jeriome Robertson; 60 Rodrigo Rosario; 23 Kirk Saarloos; 20 Ricky Stone; 31 Ron Villone; 13 Billy Wagner; 20 Octavio Dotel; 50 Rick White | Catchers: 11 Brad Ausmus; 46 Raúl Chávez; 2 Gregg Zaun; Infielders: 5 Jeff Bagwell; 27 Geoff Blum; 4 Eric Bruntlett; 14 Morgan Ensberg; 28 Adam Everett; 12 Jeff Kent; 4 Julio Lugo; 1 Dave Matranga; 10 José Vizcaíno | Outfielders: 17 Lance Berkman; 7 Craig Biggio; 15 Richard Hidalgo; 21 Brian Hunter; 24 Jason Lane; 16 Orlando Merced; 9 Colin Porter; Other batters: 3 Tripp Cromer; 2 Mitch Meluskey | Manager: 22 Jimy Williams; Coaches: 6 Mark Bailey (bullpen); 25 José Cruz (first base); 48 Burt Hooton (pitching); 38 Gene Lamont (third base); 8 Harry Spilman (hitting); 30 John Tamargo (bench) |

== Players stats ==
=== Batting ===
==== Starters by position ====
Note: Pos = Position; G = Games played; AB = At bats; H = Hits; Avg. = Batting average; HR = Home runs; RBI = Runs batted in

| Pos | Player | G | AB | H | Avg. | HR | RBI |
|---|---|---|---|---|---|---|---|
| C | Brad Ausmus | 143 | 450 | 103 | .229 | 4 | 47 |
| 1B | Jeff Bagwell | 160 | 605 | 168 | .278 | 39 | 100 |
| 2B | Jeff Kent | 130 | 505 | 150 | .297 | 22 | 93 |
| SS | Adam Everett | 128 | 387 | 99 | .256 | 8 | 51 |
| 3B | Morgan Ensberg | 127 | 385 | 112 | .291 | 25 | 60 |
| LF | Lance Berkman | 153 | 538 | 155 | .288 | 25 | 93 |
| CF | Craig Biggio | 153 | 628 | 166 | .264 | 15 | 62 |
| RF | Richard Hidalgo | 141 | 514 | 159 | .309 | 28 | 88 |

==== Other batters ====
Note: G = Games played; AB = At bats; H = Hits; Avg. = Batting average; HR = Home runs; RBI = Runs batted in

| Player | G | AB | H | Avg. | HR | RBI |
|---|---|---|---|---|---|---|
| Geoff Blum | 123 | 420 | 110 | .262 | 10 | 52 |
| Orlando Merced | 123 | 212 | 49 | .231 | 3 | 26 |
| José Vizcaíno | 91 | 189 | 47 | .249 | 3 | 26 |
| Gregg Zaun | 59 | 120 | 26 | .217 | 1 | 13 |
| Brian Hunter | 56 | 98 | 23 | .235 | 0 | 13 |
| Julio Lugo | 22 | 65 | 16 | .246 | 0 | 2 |
| Eric Bruntlett | 31 | 54 | 14 | .259 | 1 | 4 |
| Raúl Chávez | 19 | 37 | 10 | .270 | 1 | 4 |
| Colin Porter | 24 | 32 | 6 | .188 | 0 | 0 |
| Jason Lane | 18 | 27 | 8 | .296 | 4 | 10 |
| Mitch Meluskey | 12 | 9 | 1 | .111 | 0 | 2 |
| Dave Matranga | 6 | 5 | 1 | .200 | 1 | 1 |
| Tripp Cromer | 3 | 4 | 1 | .250 | 0 | 1 |

=== Pitching ===
==== Starters ====
Note: G = Games pitched; IP = Innings pitched; W = Wins; L = Losses; ERA = Earned run average; SO = Strikeouts

| Player | G | IP | W | L | ERA | SO |
|---|---|---|---|---|---|---|
| Wade Miller | 33 | 187.1 | 14 | 13 | 4.13 | 161 |
| Tim Redding | 33 | 176.0 | 10 | 14 | 3.68 | 116 |
| Jeriome Robertson | 32 | 160.2 | 15 | 9 | 5.10 | 99 |
| Roy Oswalt | 21 | 127.1 | 10 | 5 | 2.97 | 108 |
| Ron Villone | 19 | 106.2 | 6 | 6 | 4.13 | 91 |
| Jonathan Johnson | 4 | 15.1 | 0 | 1 | 5.87 | 7 |
| Brian Moehler | 3 | 13.2 | 0 | 0 | 7.90 | 5 |
| Rodrigo Rosario | 2 | 8.0 | 1 | 0 | 1.13 | 6 |

==== Other pitchers ====
Note: G = Games pitched; IP = Innings pitched; W = Wins; L = Losses; ERA = Earned run average; SO = Strikeouts

| Player | G | IP | W | L | ERA | SO |
|---|---|---|---|---|---|---|
| Jared Fernández | 12 | 38.1 | 3 | 3 | 3.99 | 19 |
| Scott Linebrink | 9 | 31.2 | 1 | 1 | 4.26 | 17 |

==== Relief pitchers ====
Note: G = Games pitched; W = Wins; L = Losses; SV = Saves; ERA = Earned run average; SO = Strikeouts

| Player | G | W | L | SV | ERA | SO |
|---|---|---|---|---|---|---|
| Billy Wagner | 78 | 1 | 4 | 44 | 1.78 | 105 |
| Brad Lidge | 78 | 6 | 3 | 1 | 3.60 | 97 |
| Octavio Dotel | 76 | 6 | 4 | 4 | 2.48 | 97 |
| Ricky Stone | 65 | 6 | 4 | 1 | 3.69 | 47 |
| Peter Munro | 40 | 3 | 4 | 0 | 4.67 | 27 |
| Kirk Saarloos | 36 | 2 | 1 | 0 | 4.93 | 43 |
| Mike Gallo | 32 | 1 | 0 | 0 | 3.00 | 16 |
| Dan Miceli | 23 | 1 | 1 | 0 | 2.10 | 20 |
| Nate Bland | 22 | 1 | 2 | 0 | 5.75 | 18 |
| Rick White | 15 | 0 | 0 | 0 | 3.72 | 17 |
| Brandon Puffer | 13 | 0 | 0 | 0 | 5.14 | 10 |
| Bruce Chen | 11 | 0 | 0 | 0 | 6.00 | 8 |
| Kirk Bullinger | 7 | 0 | 0 | 0 | 6.75 | 5 |

== Awards and achievements ==
=== Grand slams ===
| No. | Date | Astros batter | Venue | Inning | Pitcher | Opposing team | Box |
|---|---|---|---|---|---|---|---|
| 1 | April 4 | Brad Ausmus | Busch Stadium | 1 | Brett Tomko | St. Louis Cardinals | |
| 2 | June 3 | Morgan Ensberg (Note: 1st MLB grand slam) | Minute Maid Park | 8 | Kerry Ligtenberg | Baltimore Orioles | |
| 1 | July 9 | Adam Everett | Minute Maid Park | 1 | Danny Graves | Cincinnati Reds | |
| 4 | September 1 | Jeff Kent | Dodger Stadium | 9 | Rodney Myers | Los Angeles Dodgers | |

=== Awards ===
2003 Houston Astros award winners
| Name of award | | Recipient | Ref. |
|---|---|---|---|
| Baseball Digest Rookie All-Star | Starting pitcher | Jeriome Robertson | |
| Darryl Kile Good Guy Award | | Jeff Bagwell | |
| Fred Hartman Award for Long and Meritorious Service to Baseball | | Charlie Maiorana | |
| Houston-Area Major League Player of the Year | NYY | Andy Pettitte | |
| Houston Astros | Most Valuable Player (MVP) | Richard Hidalgo | |
| Houston Astros | Pitcher of the Year | Billy Wagner | |
| Houston Astros | Rookie of the Year | Brad Lidge | |
| MLB All-Star Game | Reserve pitcher | Billy Wagner | |
| National League (NL) Player of the Week | June 8 | Morgan Ensberg | |

Other awards results

| Name of award | Voting recipient(s) (Team) | Ref. |
|---|---|---|
| NL Most Valuable Player | 1st—Bonds (SFG) • 14th—Bagwell (HOU); Other Astros: 18th–Hidalgo • 23rd—Wagner | |
| NL Rookie of the Year | 1st—Willis (FLA) • 5th—Lidge (HOU) • 7th—Robertson (HOU) | |

=== League leaders ===
NL batting leaders

- Hit by pitch: Craig Biggio (27, led MLB)

NL pitching leaders

- Games finished: Billy Wagner (67, led MLB)

== Minor league system ==
| Level | Team | League | Manager |
|---|---|---|---|
| AAA | New Orleans Zephyrs | Pacific Coast League | Chris Maloney |
| AA | Round Rock Express | Texas League | Jackie Moore |
| A | Salem Avalanche | Carolina League | John Massarelli |
| A | Lexington Legends | South Atlantic League | Russ Nixon |
| A-Short Season | Tri-City ValleyCats | New York–Penn League | Iván DeJesús |
| Rookie | Martinsville Astros | Appalachian League | Jorge Orta |

Awards

- All-Star Futures Game—Second baseman: Chris Burke
- Houston Astros Minor League Player of the Year: Chris Burke

== See also ==
- List of Major League Baseball career doubles leaders
- List of Major League Baseball career hits leaders
- List of Major League Baseball career home run leaders
- List of Major League Baseball career saves leaders
- List of Major League Baseball no-hitters
- List of Major League Baseball players with a home run in their first major league at bat
- List of Major League Baseball single-inning strikeout leaders
