= Rodrigo Rosario =

Dominican baseball player (born 1978)

- Pitcher
- Born: March 4, 1978 (age 48); San Pedro de Macorís, Dominican Republic
- Batted: Right Threw: Right

MLB debut
- June 21, 2003, for the Houston Astros

Last MLB appearance
- June 27, 2003, for the Houston Astros

MLB statistics
- Win–loss record: 1–0
- Earned run average: 1.13
- Strikeouts: 6
- Stats at Baseball Reference

Teams
- Houston Astros (2003)

Rodrigo Rosario (born March 4, 1978), is a Dominican former professional baseball player. A pitcher, Rosario made his Major League Baseball debut in 2003 for the Houston Astros. His rookie season was limited to two starts. His debut was a win versus the Texas Rangers but had to leave his second start in the second inning because of shoulder tightness to which he required surgery to repair partial tears of his rotator cuff and biceps tendon.
