= David Weathers =

American baseball player (born 1969)

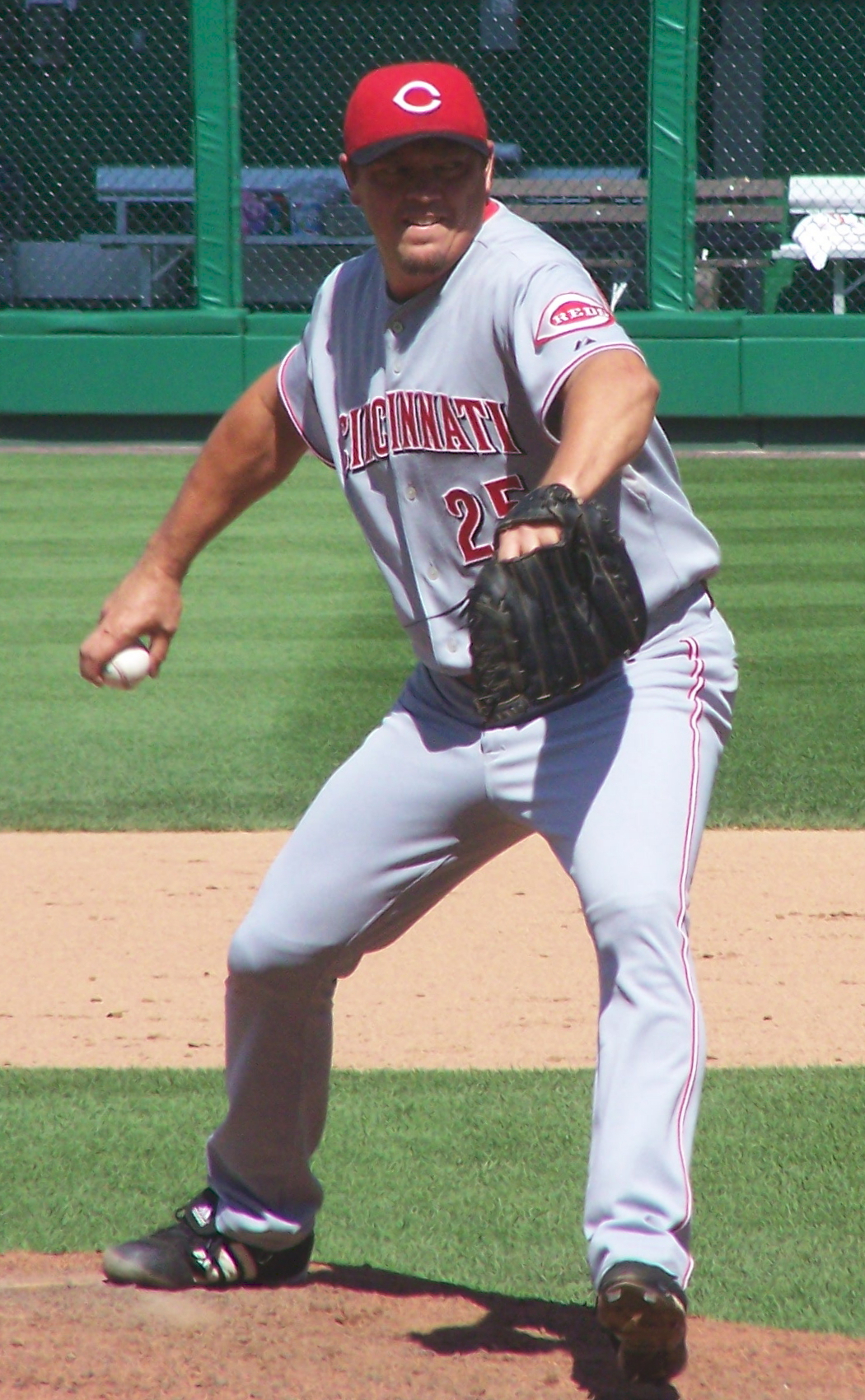
- Weathers with the Cincinnati Reds in 2008
- Pitcher
- Born: September 25, 1969 (age 57); Lawrenceburg, Tennessee, U.S.
- Batted: Right Threw: Right

MLB debut
- August 2, 1991, for the Toronto Blue Jays

Last MLB appearance
- October 3, 2009, for the Milwaukee Brewers

MLB statistics
- Win–loss record: 73–88
- Earned run average: 4.25
- Strikeouts: 976
- Stats at Baseball Reference

Teams
- Toronto Blue Jays (1991–1992); Florida Marlins (1993–1996); New York Yankees (1996–1997); Cleveland Indians (1997); Cincinnati Reds (1998); Milwaukee Brewers (1998–2001); Chicago Cubs (2001); New York Mets (2002–2004); Houston Astros (2004); Florida Marlins (2004); Cincinnati Reds (2005–2009); Milwaukee Brewers (2009)

Career highlights and awards
- World Series champion (1996)

John David Weathers (born September 25, 1969) is an American former Major League Baseball pitcher. He was a part of the New York Yankees' 1996 World Series championship over the Atlanta Braves.

== Early career ==
Weathers attended Motlow State Community College in Moore County, Tennessee, and was drafted by the Toronto Blue Jays in the 3rd round of the 1988 Major League Baseball draft. Weathers made his Major League debut with the Blue Jays on August 2, 1991, and was drafted by the Florida Marlins in the 1992 Major League Baseball expansion draft.

== Mid-career ==
Weathers played for the Marlins until 1996, when he was traded to the New York Yankees for Mark Hutton. Weathers won a World Series with the Yankees that year. He was traded by the Yankees to the Cleveland Indians on June 9, 1997, for outfielder Chad Curtis.

On December 20, 1997, Weathers was claimed off waivers by the Cincinnati Reds. On June 24, 1998, Weathers was claimed off waivers by the Milwaukee Brewers. Weathers stayed with Milwaukee until July 30, 2001, when he was traded to the Chicago Cubs, along with Robert Miniel, for Ruben Quevedo and Pete Zoccolillo. He became a free agent at the end of the season and signed with the New York Mets. Weathers pitched for the Mets until June 17, 2004, when he and Jeremy Griffiths were traded to the Houston Astros for Richard Hidalgo. Weathers was released by the Astros on September 7, 2004, and signed with the Marlins the following day.

== Later career ==
A free agent at the end of the season, Weathers signed with the Cincinnati Reds (returning to the team he played for in early 1998), where he had an ERA under 4.00 every year that he was with the club. He was the closer for the Reds in 2007 and had 33 saves.

On August 9, 2009, the Cincinnati Reds traded Weathers to the Milwaukee Brewers for a player to be named later. Weathers was quoted as saying of Cincinnati, "I really felt like this is probably where I would end my career, and I really wanted to. But in this game, things don't go like you want them or how you plan them. It's a good day but, to be honest with you, it's a tough day emotionally because you form a lot of bonds, a lot of trust with guys you've been with for five or six years. You just don't find that every day, especially in this game." Weathers played 25 more games with the Brewers before playing in his final Major League game on October 3, 2009.

== Personal life ==
His son, Ryan Weathers, is a pitcher in MLB. His daughter, Karly, plays basketball at Alabama.
