= Dave Matranga =

American baseball player (born 1977)

- Second baseman
- Born: January 8, 1977 (age 49); Orange, California, U.S.
- Batted: Right Threw: Right

MLB debut
- June 27, 2003, for the Houston Astros

Last MLB appearance
- May 8, 2005, for the Los Angeles Angels of Anaheim

MLB statistics
- Batting average: .167
- Home runs: 1
- Runs batted in: 1
- Stats at Baseball Reference

Teams
- Houston Astros (2003); Los Angeles Angels of Anaheim (2005)

David Michael Matranga (born January 8, 1977) is an American former professional baseball infielder. He played parts of two seasons in Major League Baseball (MLB) for the Houston Astros in 2003 and Los Angeles Angels of Anaheim in 2005.

== Career ==
Matranga played for the Texas Rangers Triple-A affiliate, the Oklahoma Redhawks, in 2007. In January 2008, Matranga signed a minor league contract with the Kansas City Royals. He became a free agent at the end of the season and signed a minor league contract with the Florida Marlins in February 2009. After playing the entire season for their top farm team, the New Orleans Zephyrs, he became a free agent once again.

Matranga was the 86th player in major league history and the second player in Houston Astros history to hit a home run in his first plate appearance, doing so on June 27, 2003. Pinch-hitting in the ninth spot, Matranga batted in the fifth inning against Joaquin Benoit, which tied the game 4-4, although the Rangers later rallied to win it, 10–7.

As it turned out, it was his only major league hit, as he failed to get a hit in his next five plate appearances in MLB, with his final appearance being the lone one with the Los Angeles Angels of Anaheim in 2005. After being released by the team on July 9, 2005, he signed as a free agent with four teams over the next four years, although he never made it back to the big leagues.

After retiring at 32, Matranga became a sports agent, becoming Director of Scouting at PSI Sports Management.

== See also ==
- List of Major League Baseball players with a home run in their first major league at bat
