= Juan Cerros =

Mexican baseball player (born 1976)

Saraperos de Saltillo
- Pitcher / Coach
- Born: September 25, 1976 (age 49); Monterrey, Mexico
- Batted: Right Threw: Right

MLB debut
- September 8, 2003, for the Cincinnati Reds

Last MLB appearance
- September 28, 2003, for the Cincinnati Reds

MLB statistics
- Win–loss record: 0–0
- Earned run average: 4.85
- Strikeouts: 9
- Stats at Baseball Reference

Teams
- Cincinnati Reds (2003)

Juan Cerros (born September 25, 1976) is a Mexican former professional baseball pitcher who played with the Cincinnati Reds of Major League Baseball (MLB). He is currently the pitching coach for the Saraperos de Saltillo of the Mexican League.
