= Josh Hall (baseball) =

American baseball player (born 1980)

- Pitcher
- Born: December 16, 1980 (age 45); Lynchburg, Virginia, U.S.
- Batted: Right Threw: Right

MLB debut
- August 2, 2003, for the Cincinnati Reds

Last MLB appearance
- September 24, 2003, for the Cincinnati Reds

MLB statistics
- Win–loss record: 0–2
- Earned run average: 6.57
- Strikeouts: 18
- Stats at Baseball Reference

Teams
- Cincinnati Reds (2003)

Joshua Alan Hall (born December 16, 1980) is an American former Major League Baseball starting pitcher. He has played in Major League Baseball for the Cincinnati Reds in 2003.

Hall was drafted by the Cincinnati Reds in the 7th round of the 1998 Major League Baseball draft. His best minor league season was in 2001 with the Single-A Dayton Dragons. He went 11–5 with a 2.66 ERA and 122 strikeouts. He made his major league debut against the San Francisco Giants on August 2, 2003, as a spot starter going 5 innings, giving up 2 earned runs, and getting a no-decision. Hall missed the entire 2004 season due to an injury and began 2005 back in the minors. First at High-A Sarasota, he was then promoted to Double-A Chattanooga where he had a 3.53 ERA. He played mostly with Chattanooga again in 2006, but also some with Triple-A Louisville.

Hall became a free agent after the 2006 season and signed with the Washington Nationals on November 6, 2006. In 2007, Hall was mostly a relief pitcher for Double-A Harrisburg, but in 2008, again with Harrisburg, he was a starter. After 7 games, he was released by the Nationals and signed a minor league contract with the Colorado Rockies. With Colorado, he split the rest of the season with Double-A Tulsa and Triple-A Colorado Springs. He became a free agent at the end of the season and re-signed with the Rockies in January 2009. Hall was released by the Colorado Rockies at the end of Spring training. On May 11, 2009 Hall agreed to a minor league deal with the Mariners. He declared free agency in November of that year.
