= Pete Zoccolillo =

American baseball player (born 1977)

- Outfielder
- Born: February 6, 1977 (age 49); Bronx, New York, U.S.
- Batted: Left Threw: Right

MLB debut
- September 5, 2003, for the Milwaukee Brewers

Last MLB appearance
- September 28, 2003, for the Milwaukee Brewers

MLB statistics
- Batting average: .108
- Hits: 4
- Runs batted in: 3
- Stats at Baseball Reference

Teams
- Milwaukee Brewers (2003)

Peter Jude Zoccolillo (born February 6, 1977) is an American former professional baseball outfielder. He played part of the 2003 season in Major League Baseball for the Milwaukee Brewers.

== Career ==
He played college baseball at Rutgers University where he was three times All-Big East First Team. He graduated with a degree in communications and a minor in psychology. He was drafted by the Chicago Cubs in the 23rd round of the 1999 amateur draft. At the trade deadline in 2001, the Cubs traded him and Rubén Quevedo to the Brewers for David Weathers and a minor leaguer.

Zoccolillo made his Major League debut on September 5, 2003 at Miller Park. He recorded his first Major League hit on September 9 against Tim Redding of the Houston Astros. Following the season, the Texas Rangers selected him from the Brewers in the minor league phase of the Rule 5 draft.

After spending the 2005 season in the minors with the St. Louis Cardinals, he signed a contract with the Colorado Rockies. After playing with Italy at the 2006 World Baseball Classic, however, he decided to retire from professional baseball.

== Personal life ==
Zoccolillo's father, Al, coached the Iona Gaels baseball team. His mother, Terry, was a teacher. He met his wife, Denise, before his final year at Rutgers.

In 2011, he was living in Randolph, New Jersey, working as a salesman for Enzo Clinical Labs and coaching youth baseball. In 2021, he was living in Mount Olive Township, New Jersey and was hired to coach the baseball team at Mount Olive High School.
