= Luis Martínez (pitcher) =

Dominican baseball player (born 1980)

- Pitcher
- Born: January 20, 1980 (age 46); Santo Domingo, Dominican Republic
- Batted: Left Threw: Left

MLB debut
- September 3, 2003, for the Milwaukee Brewers

Last MLB appearance
- September 28, 2003, for the Milwaukee Brewers

MLB statistics
- Win–loss record: 0–3
- Earned run average: 9.92
- Strikeouts: 10
- Stats at Baseball Reference

Teams
- Milwaukee Brewers (2003); Chunichi Dragons (2005–2006); La New Bears (2007)

Luis Martínez (born January 20, 1980) is a Dominican former professional baseball pitcher. He has pitched four games in Major League Baseball, all as a starting pitcher for the Milwaukee Brewers during the 2003 season, and two seasons with the Chunichi Dragons of Nippon Professional Baseball in 2005–06. He most recently pitched for the Coastal Bay Thunder of United League Baseball in 2010. Listed at 6' 6", 200 lb., Martínez bats and throws left-handed.

== Career ==
Born in Santo Domingo, Dominican Republic, Martínez was signed as a 16-year-old amateur free agent by the Brewers in 1996. He was assigned to their minor league complex, spending six years in the minors (1998–2003) before joining the big club in late September 2003. He posted a 0–3 record with a 9.92 ERA in four starts for Milwaukee, allowing 18 runs on 25 hits, while striking out 10 and walking 15 in 16.1 innings of work.

Following his majors stint, Martínez played in the St. Louis Cardinals and Colorado Rockies minor league systems in 2004. While in St. Louis, he was traded to the Rockies the same transaction that brought Larry Walker to the Cardinals. He became a free agent after the 2004 season and signed with the Arizona Diamondbacks. Prior to the start of the 2005 season, he went to Japan, where he played two seasons for the Dragons. In his two NPB seasons, he went 14–13 with a 3.82 ERA.

He later pitched in the Dominican Winter League and for the 2008 Saraperos de Saltillo of the Mexican League. After sitting out the 2009 season, Martínez split the 2010 season between the Thunder and the Rio Grande Valley WhiteWings, both of ULB.

== See also ==
- List of MLB players from the Dominican Republic

== Sources ==
- Career statistics from MLB · Baseball Reference · Fangraphs · Baseball Reference (Minors) · Retrosheet · Baseball Almanac
- Retrosheet
