= Frank Charles (baseball) =

American baseball player (born 1969)

- Pinch hitter/Catcher
- Born: February 23, 1969 (age 57); Fontana, California
- Batted: Right Threw: Right

MLB debut
- September 5, 2000, for the Houston Astros

Last MLB appearance
- October 1, 2000, for the Houston Astros

MLB statistics
- Batting average: .429
- Home runs: 0
- Runs batted in: 2
- Stats at Baseball Reference

Teams
- Houston Astros (2000)

Franklin Scott Charles (born February 23, 1969) is a former professional baseball catcher. He played part of one season in Major League Baseball for the Houston Astros in 2000.

== Amateur career ==
A native of Fontana, California, Charles attended Montclair College Preparatory School and Cal State Fullerton. In 1989 and 1990, he played collegiate summer baseball with the Brewster Whitecaps of the Cape Cod Baseball League. He was selected by the San Francisco Giants in the 17th round of the 1991 amateur entry draft.

== Professional career ==
In March 1994 he was purchased by the Rangers from the St. Paul Saints of the Northern League. In March 1998 he was signed as free agent by the Giants, and in December 1998 by the Padres. In January 1999 he was signed as free agent by the Astros. In 2000, he played four games for the Houston Astros, batting .429 in seven at bats. Over 14 minor league seasons, Charles batted .273.

== Personal ==
Charles is Jewish.

== See also ==
- List of Jewish Major League Baseball players
