= Enrique Cruz (baseball) =

Dominican baseball player (born 1981)

- Infielder
- Born: November 21, 1981 (age 44); Santo Domingo, Dominican Republic
- Batted: Right Threw: Right

MLB debut
- April 2, 2003, for the Milwaukee Brewers

Last MLB appearance
- April 16, 2007, for the Cincinnati Reds

MLB statistics
- Batting average: .083
- Home runs: 0
- Runs batted in: 2

Teams
- Milwaukee Brewers (2003); Cincinnati Reds (2007)

Enrique Manuel Cruz (born November 21, 1981) is a Dominican former professional baseball player. He spent two seasons in Major League Baseball, playing for the Milwaukee Brewers and the Cincinnati Reds. He was signed as an undrafted free agent by the New York Mets in 1998. Cruz played his first professional season with their Rookie league GCL Mets. He last played in 2012 for the Kansas City T-Bones of the American Association of Independent Professional Baseball.
