= Jim Chamblee =

American baseball player (born 1975)

- Third baseman / Pinch hitter
- Born: May 6, 1975; Denton, Texas, U.S.
- Batted: Right Threw: Right

MLB debut
- August 24, 2003, for the Cincinnati Reds

Last MLB appearance
- August 25, 2003, for the Cincinnati Reds

MLB statistics
- Games played: 2
- At bats: 2
- Hits: 0
- Stats at Baseball Reference

Teams
- Cincinnati Reds (2003)

James Nathaniel Chamblee (born May 6, 1975) is an American former Major League Baseball player. Chamblee played in two games for the Cincinnati Reds in 2003 as a third baseman and pinch hitter.
