= Jason Green =

Canadian baseball player (born 1975)

- Pitcher
- Born: June 5, 1975 (age 51); Port Hope, Ontario, Canada
- Batted: Right Threw: Right

MLB debut
- July 23, 2000, for the Houston Astros

Last MLB appearance
- September 29, 2000, for the Houston Astros

MLB statistics
- Win–loss record: 1–1
- Earned run average: 6.62
- Strikeouts: 19
- Stats at Baseball Reference

Teams
- Houston Astros (2000)
Medals
Men's baseball
Representing Canada
Pan American Games
Bronze medal – third place	1999 Winnipeg	Team

David Jason Green (born June 5, 1975) is a Canadian former professional baseball pitcher who played for the Houston Astros of Major League Baseball (MLB) in 2000.
