= Rubén Quevedo =

Venezuelan baseball player (1979–2016)

- Pitcher
- Born: January 5, 1979; Valencia, Venezuela
- Died: June 7, 2016 (aged 37); La Guaira, Venezuela
- Batted: Right Threw: Right

MLB debut
- April 14, 2000, for the Chicago Cubs

Last MLB appearance
- September 28, 2003, for the Milwaukee Brewers

MLB statistics
- Win–loss record: 14–30
- Earned run average: 6.15
- Strikeouts: 237
- Stats at Baseball Reference

Teams
- Chicago Cubs (2000); Milwaukee Brewers (2001–2003)

Rubén Eduardo Quevedo (Spanish pronunciation: [ruˈβeŋ keˈβeðo]; January 5, 1979 – June 7, 2016) was a Venezuelan professional baseball pitcher. He played in Major League Baseball (MLB) for the Chicago Cubs (2000) and Milwaukee Brewers (2001–03).

== Career ==
Quevedo was signed as an international free agent by the Atlanta Braves in 1995 and was traded to the Cubs in 1999. He played with the Cubs in 2000 and was traded to the Milwaukee Brewers in 2001 with Pete Zoccolillo for right-handed pitcher David Weathers. After three years with Milwaukee, Quevedo signed as a free agent with the Baltimore Orioles in 2004. He appeared in one game for Baltimore's Double–A affiliate, the Bowie Baysox.

Quevedo's most effective pitch was his changeup, which he threw with the same arm motion as his 89 MPH fastball. Meanwhile, his slider and curve were average. He allowed a significant number of fly balls, resulting in a high number of home runs allowed. In a four-year MLB career, Quevedo posted a 14–30 record with 237 strikeouts and a 6.15 ERA in 326.1 innings. During his minor league career he was named a Triple–A All-Star in 2001 while pitching for the Iowa Cubs.

== Personal life ==
Quevedo died of a heart attack on June 7, 2016.

== See also ==
- List of Major League Baseball players from Venezuela
