= Mitch Meluskey =

American baseball player (born 1973)

- Catcher
- Born: September 18, 1973 (age 53); Yakima, Washington, U.S.
- Batted: Both Threw: Right

MLB debut
- August 30, 1998, for the Houston Astros

Last MLB appearance
- September 26, 2003, for the Houston Astros

MLB statistics
- Batting average: .283
- Home runs: 15
- Runs batted in: 75
- Stats at Baseball Reference

Teams
- Houston Astros (1998–2000); Detroit Tigers (2002); Houston Astros (2003)

Mitchell Wade Meluskey (born September 18, 1973) is an American former professional baseball player. He played all or parts of five seasons in Major League Baseball, between 1998 and 2003, for the Houston Astros and Detroit Tigers, primarily as a catcher.

== Professional career ==
Meluskey played his entire career in the National League with the Astros except for 8 games with Detroit in 2002. He is best remembered by Astros fans for punching fellow Astro Matt Mieske in the eye during batting practice in on June 11, 2000. Meluskey was late for his turn at bat and then tried to cut in front of Mieske. Heated words were exchanged, and Meluskey responded by punching Mieske in the eye. Immediately afterwards Meluskey was hustled from the field while Mieske was treated on the ground for his injury. Astros star player Craig Biggio expressed his frustration over the incident, stating, "To me, it has everything to do with respect. You know, some people have it and some people don't. I'm going to leave it at that. There's no way in the world something like that should happen."

On April 20, 1999, Meluskey hit his first major league home run off of Chicago Cubs pitcher Matt Karchner.

In 2000, Meluskey finished fifth in balloting for the National League Rookie of the Year award after hitting .300 with 14 home runs and 69 runs batted in. That same year, Mike Piazza had to drop out of the All-Star game after being hit in the head by a Roger Clemens fastball on July 8, 3 days earlier. NL manager Bobby Cox wanted Meluskey to be Piazza's replacement, but was unable to contact Meluskey due to Mitch being on a trip to South Padre Island, Texas. Chicago Cub Joe Girardi was selected instead.

The 2000 season marked the peak of his career and his final year with the Astros, as he was traded to Detroit in a six-player deal during the offseason. In March 2001, a shoulder injury sidelined him for the entire season. Injuries continued to hamper his performance over the next two years, during which he failed to hit a single home run.

Meluskey retired in 2004, never making an All-Star team.

== Personal life ==
Meluskey resides in Yakima, Washington.
