= Stephen Smitherman =

American baseball player (born 1978)

- Left fielder
- Born: September 1, 1978 (age 47); McAlester, Oklahoma, U.S.
- Batted: Right Threw: Right

MLB debut
- July 1, 2003, for the Cincinnati Reds

Last MLB appearance
- September 25, 2003, for the Cincinnati Reds

MLB statistics
- Batting average: .159
- Home runs: 1
- Runs batted in: 6
- Stats at Baseball Reference

Teams
- Cincinnati Reds (2003)

Stephen Lydell Smitherman (born September 1, 1978) is an American former Major League Baseball left fielder who played for the Cincinnati Reds in 2003.

He played his final professional season in 2006 for the Double-A Mobile BayBears in the San Diego Padres organization, where he hit .240 with 19 home runs and 58 RBI.
