= 2002 San Francisco Giants season =

Major League Baseball season

2002 San Francisco Giants
- National League champions National League Wild Card winners
- League: National League
- Division: West
- Ballpark: Pacific Bell Park
- City: San Francisco
- Record: 95–66 (.590)
- Divisional place: 2nd
- Owners: Peter Magowan
- General managers: Brian Sabean
- Managers: Dusty Baker
- Television: KTVU (Mike Krukow, Joe Angel, Jon Miller, Lon Simmons, Duane Kuiper, Tim McCarver); FSN Bay Area (Mike Krukow, Duane Kuiper)
- Radio: KNBR (Mike Krukow, Lon Simmons, Jon Miller, Joe Angel, Duane Kuiper); KZSF (Erwin Higueros, Amaury Pi-Gonzalez)

The 2002 season was the 120th in the history of the San Francisco Giants, the franchise's 45th season in San Francisco, and their third in Pacific Bell Park. The season ended with the Giants winning the National League pennant but losing to the Anaheim Angels in the World Series.

The Giants finished the regular season with a record of 95–66, 2 1/2 games behind the Arizona Diamondbacks in the National League West standings. By virtue of having the best record among second-place teams in the National League, they won the NL wild card to earn a postseason berth.

In the postseason, the Giants faced the Atlanta Braves in the NLDS. After being brought to the brink of elimination, the Giants won Games 4 and 5 to clinch the series, three games to two. They went on to defeat the St. Louis Cardinals in the NLCS, four games to one to win the franchise's 17th NL championship and its third in San Francisco. Then, in the World Series, they brought the Angels to the brink of elimination before the Angels came from behind to win Games 6 and 7.

2002 was manager Dusty Baker's tenth and final season managing the Giants. Following the season he departed to manage the Chicago Cubs.

== Offseason ==
- November 28, 2001: Wayne Gomes was released by the San Francisco Giants.
- December 16, 2001: Tsuyoshi Shinjo was traded by the New York Mets with Desi Relaford to the San Francisco Giants for Shawn Estes.
- December 18, 2001: Jason Schmidt was signed as a free agent with the San Francisco Giants.
- January 25, 2002: David Bell was traded by the Seattle Mariners to the San Francisco Giants for Desi Relaford and cash.

== Regular season ==
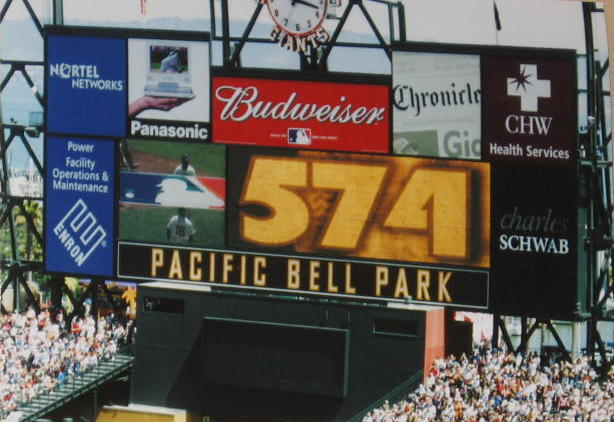
Barry Bonds passes Harmon Killebrew for seventh on the all-time home run list on May 13, 2002.

=== Opening Day starters ===
- SP- Jason Schmidt
- C- Benito Santiago
- 1B – J. T. Snow
- 2B – Jeff Kent
- SS – Rich Aurilia
- 3B – Pedro Feliz
- LF – Barry Bonds
- CF – Tsuyoshi Shinjo
- RF – Reggie Sanders

=== Season standings ===
==== National League West ====
NL West
Team	W	L	Pct.	GB	Home	Road
Arizona Diamondbacks	98	64	.605	—	55‍–‍26	43‍–‍38
San Francisco Giants	95	66	.590	2½	50‍–‍31	45‍–‍35
Los Angeles Dodgers	92	70	.568	6	46‍–‍35	46‍–‍35
Colorado Rockies	73	89	.451	25	47‍–‍34	26‍–‍55
San Diego Padres	66	96	.407	32	41‍–‍40	25‍–‍56

==== Record vs. opponents ====
2002 National League record Source: MLB Standings Grid – 2002
Team	AZ	ATL	CHC	CIN	COL	FLA	HOU	LAD	MIL	MON	NYM	PHI	PIT	SD	SF	STL	AL
Arizona	—	3–3	4–2	6–0	14–5	5–1	3–3	9–10	4–2	4–2	5–2	4–3	4–2	12–7	8–11	2–4	11–7
Atlanta	3–3	—	4–2	4–2	4–3	11–8	3–3	2–4	5–1	13–6	12–7	11–7	3–3	3–3	3–3–1	5–1	15–3
Chicago	2–4	2–4	—	5–12	4–2	4–2	8–11	2–4	7–10	3–3	1–5	2–4	10–9	2–4	3–3	6–12	6–6
Cincinnati	0–6	2–4	12–5	—	3–3	5–1	6–11	4–2	13–6	1–5	2–4	2–4	11–7	5–1	2–4	8–11	2–10
Colorado	5–14	3–4	2–4	3–3	—	5–2	3–3	7–12	3–3	4–2	3–3	3–3	4–2	11–8	8–12	2–4	7–11
Florida	1–5	8–11	2–4	1–5	2–5	—	3–3	3–3	4–2	10–9	8–11	10–9	4–2	5–1	4–3	4–2	10–8
Houston	3–3	3–3	11–8	11–6	3–3	3–3	—	3–3	10–8	3–3	4–2	3–3	11–6	4–2	1–5	6–13	5–7
Los Angeles	10–9	4–2	4–2	2–4	12–7	3–3	3–3	—	5–1	5–2	4–2	4–3	4–2	10–9	8–11	2–4	12–6
Milwaukee	2–4	1–5	10–7	6–13	3–3	2–4	8–10	1–5	—	2–4	1–5	1–5	4–15	5–1	1–5	7–10	2–10
Montreal	2–4	6–13	3–3	5–1	2–4	9–10	3–3	2–5	4–2	—	11–8	11–8	3–3	3–4	4–2	3–3	12–6
New York	2–5	7–12	5–1	4–2	3–3	11–8	2–4	2–4	5–1	8–11	—	9–10	1–4	3–4	0–6	3–3	10–8
Philadelphia	3–4	7–11	4–2	4–2	3–3	9–10	3–3	3–4	5–1	8–11	10–9	—	2–4	2–4	3–3	4–2	10–8
Pittsburgh	2–4	3–3	9–10	7–11	2–4	2–4	6–11	2–4	15–4	3–3	4–1	4–2	—	2–4	2–4	6–11	3–9
San Diego	7–12	3–3	4–2	1–5	8–11	1–5	2–4	9–10	1–5	4–3	4–3	4–2	4–2	—	5–14	1–5	8–10
San Francisco	11–8	3–3–1	3–3	4–2	11–8	3–4	5–1	11–8	5–1	2–4	6–0	3–3	4–2	14–5	—	2–4	8–10
St. Louis	4–2	1–5	12–6	11–8	4–2	2–4	13–6	4–2	10–7	3–3	3–3	2–4	11–6	5–1	4–2	—	8–4

=== Transactions ===
- June 4, 2002: Matt Cain was drafted by the San Francisco Giants in the 1st round (25th pick) of the 2002 amateur draft. Player signed June 26, 2002.
- July 28, 2002: Kenny Lofton was traded by the Chicago White Sox to the San Francisco Giants for Felix Diaz and Ryan Meaux (minors).
- September 4, 2002: Bill Mueller was traded by the Chicago Cubs with cash to the San Francisco Giants for Jeff Verplancke (minors).

== Game log and schedule ==
Legend
	Giants win
	Giants loss
	Postponement
**Bold**	Giants team member

2002 Game Log (95–66) (Home: 50–31; Road: 45–35)
April (15–11) (Home: 7–4; Road: 8–7)

#	Date	Opponent	Score	Win	Loss	Save	Stadium	Attendance	Record	Report
1	April 2	@ Dodgers	9–2	**Hernández** (1–0)	Brown (0-1)	–	Dodger Stadium	53,356	1–0	W1
2	April 3	@ Dodgers	12–0	**Ortiz** (1–0)	Nomo (0–1)	–	Dodger Stadium	36,374	2–0	W2
3	April 4	@ Dodgers	3–0	**Jensen** (1–0)	Perez (0–1)	**Nen** (1)	Dodger Stadium	32,064	3–0	W3
4	April 5	Padres	3–1 (10)	**Worrell** (1–0)	Reed (0-1)		**Pacific Bell Park**	41,714	4–0	W4
5	April 6	Padres	4–1	**Fultz** (1–0)	Jarvis (0–2)	**Nen** (2)	**Pacific Bell Park**	40,894	5–0	W5
6	April 7	Padres	10–1	**Hernández** (2–0)	Tollberg (0–2)		**Pacific Bell Park**	40,819	6–0	W6
7	April 9	Dodgers	0–3	Nomo (1–1)	**Ortiz** (1–1)	Gagne (2)	**Pacific Bell Park**	40,706	6–1	L1
8	April 10	Dodgers	2–1	**Nen** (1–0)	Quantrill (0–1)	–	**Pacific Bell Park**	40,762	7–1	W1
9	April 11	Dodgers	3–4	Daal (1–0)	**Rueter** (0–1)	Gagne (3)	**Pacific Bell Park**	40,934	7–2	L1
10	April 12	Brewers	5–1	**Ainsworth** (1–0)	Sheets (1–2)		**Pacific Bell Park**	37,483	8–2	W1
11	April 13	Brewers	3–2	**Hernández** (3–0)	Figueroa (0-1)	**Nen** (3)	**Pacific Bell Park**	41,206	9–2	W2
12	April 14	Brewers	3–4	Vizcaino (1-1)	**Rodríguez** (0–1)		**Pacific Bell Park**	40,936	9–3	L1
13	April 15	@ Padres	3–4	Embree (2-0)	**Christiansen** (0–1)		Qualcomm Stadium	14,675	9–4	L2
14	April 16	@ Padres	5–1	**Rueter** (1–1)	Tomko (0-1)		Qualcomm Stadium	20,930	10–4	W1
15	April 17	@ Padres	3–5	Jarvis (1-3)	**Ainsworth** (1–1)	Hoffman (6)	Qualcomm Stadium	22,438	10–5	L1
16	April 19	@ Astros	3–2	**Hernández** (4–0)	Reynolds (2–2)	**Nen** (4)	Astros Field	32,028	11–5	W1
17	April 20	@ Astros	13–9	**Ortiz** (2–1)	Redding (0-1)	**Nen** (5)	Astros Field	35,969	12–5	W2
18	April 21	@ Astros	0–4	Mlicki (2–2)	**Jensen** (1–1)		Astros Field	32,305	12–6	L1
19	April 23	@ Cubs	12–4	**Rueter** (2–1)	Bere (1–2)		Wrigley Field	30,643	13–6	W1
20	April 24	@ Cubs	4–10	Borowski (1-0)	**Fultz** (1–1)		Wrigley Field	28,817	13–7	L1
21	April 25	@ Cubs	1–2	Lieber (3-0)	**Hernández** (4–1)	Alfonseca (4)	Wrigley Field	33,138	13–8	L2
22	April 26	@ Reds	3–4	Sullivan (3-0)	**Rodríguez** (0–2)	Graves (9)	Cinergy Field	28,341	13–9	L3
23	April 27	@ Reds	4–8 (8)	Rijo (2-0)	**Jensen** (1–2)		Cinergy Field	22,616	13–10	L4
24	April 28	@ Reds	5–4	**Rueter** (3–1)	Haynes (2-3)	**Nen** (6)	Cinergy Field	23,426	14–10	W1
25	April 29	Phillies	8–5	**Worrell** (2–0)	Cormier (1-3)	**Nen** (7)	**Pacific Bell Park**	35,136	15–10	W2
26	April 30	Phillies	2–8	Padilla (3–2)	**Hernández** (4–2)		**Pacific Bell Park**	34,918	15–11	L1

May (15–12) (Home: 10–6; Road: 5–6)

#	Date	Opponent	Score	Win	Loss	Save	Stadium	Attendance	Record	Report
27	May 1	Phillies	2–1	**Rodríguez** (1–2)	Bottalico (0–2)	**Nen** (8)	**Pacific Bell Park**	36,304	16–11	W1
28	May 3	Reds	6–1	**Rueter** (4–1)	Rijo (2–1)		**Pacific Bell Park**	39,845	17–11	W2
29	May 4	Reds	3–0	**Jensen** (2–2)	Haynes (2–4)	**Nen** (9)	**Pacific Bell Park**	40,959	18–11	W3
30	May 5	Reds	6–5 (10)	**Nen** (2–0)	Pineda (0–3)		**Pacific Bell Park**	41,263	19–11	W4
31	May 7	@ Mets	5–1	**Ortiz** (3–1)	Trachsel (2–4)		Shea Stadium	40,016	20–11	W5
32	May 8	@ Mets	8–2	**Rueter** (5–1)	Estes (1–4)		Shea Stadium	29,267	21–11	W6
33	May 9	@ Mets	4–3	**Jensen** (3–2)	Astacio (5–2)	**Nen** (10)	Shea Stadium	28,757	22–11	W7
34	May 10	@ Expos	3–6	Vázquez (2–2)	**Hernández** (4–3)		Olympic Stadium	7,238	22–12	L1
35	May 11	@ Expos	3–2	**Fultz** (2–1)	Reames (0–1)	**Nen** (11)	Olympic Stadium	29,778	23–12	W1
36	May 12	@ Expos	2–4	Armas Jr (5–3)	**Ortiz** (3–2)	Herges (6)	Olympic Stadium	5,528	23–13	L1
37	May 13	Braves	7–6 (11)	**Worrell** (3–0)	Hammond (1–2)		**Pacific Bell Park**	36,331	24–13	W1
38	May 14	Braves	2–0	**Jensen** (4–2)	Moss (1–1)	**Nen** (12)	**Pacific Bell Park**	36,972	25–13	W2
39	May 15	Braves	1–6	Maddux (4–2)	**Hernández** (4–4)		**Pacific Bell Park**	38,164	25–14	L1
40	May 16	Braves	4–5	Marquis (3–2)	**Schmidt** (0–1)		**Pacific Bell Park**	40,236	25–15	L2
41	May 17	Marlins	9–3	**Ortiz** (4–2)	Dempster (2–4)	**Nen** (13)	**Pacific Bell Park**	37,977	26–15	W1
42	May 18	Marlins	10–5	**Rueter** (6–1)	Penny (3–3)	**Nen** (14)	**Pacific Bell Park**	40,922	27–15	W2
43	May 19	Marlins	2–4	Beckett (2–2)	**Jensen** (4–3)	Núñez (9)	**Pacific Bell Park**	40,805	27–16	L1
44	May 21	@ Diamondbacks	4–9	Johnson (8–1)	**Fultz** (2–2)		Bank One Ballpark	47,602	27–17	L2
45	May 22	@ Diamondbacks	12–5	**Zerbe** (1–0)	Morgan (1–1)		Bank One Ballpark	40,351	28–17	W1
46	May 24	@ Rockies	5–8	Stark (3–0)	**Ortiz** (4–3)	Jiménez (12)	Coors Field	37,627	28–18	L1
47	May 25	@ Rockies	3–6	Nichting (1–1)	**Rueter** (6–2)		Coors Field	41,957	28–19	L2
48	May 26	@ Rockies	6–10	Jennings (5–2)	**Jensen** (4–4)		Coors Field	48,073	28–20	L3
49	May 27	Diamondbacks	7–3	**Hernández** (5–4)	Anderson (0–4)		**Pacific Bell Park**	42,005	29–20	W1
50	May 28	Diamondbacks	1–0 (10)	**Nen** (3–0)	Myers (3–2)		**Pacific Bell Park**	38,390	30–20	W2
51	May 29	Diamondbacks	3–7	Schilling (10–1)	**Ortiz** (4–4)		**Pacific Bell Park**	40,198	30–21	L1
52	May 30	Diamondbacks	0–1	Helling (5–5)	**Rueter** (6–3)	Kim (13)	**Pacific Bell Park**	41,156	30–22	L2
53	May 31	Rockies	2–6	Jennings (6–2)	**Jensen** (4–5)	Jones (1)	**Pacific Bell Park**	38,337	30–23	L3

June (15–12) (Home: 7–6; Road: 8–6)

#	Date	Opponent	Score	Win	Loss	Save	Stadium	Attendance	Record	Report
54	June 1	Rockies	4–5	Hampton (3–6)	**Hernández** (5–5)	Jiménez (15)	**Pacific Bell Park**	40,893	30–24	L4
55	June 2	Rockies	9–2	**Schmidt** (1–1)	Thomson (6–4)		**Pacific Bell Park**	40,651	31–24	W1
56	June 3	@ Padres	11–3	**Ortiz** (5–4)	Middlebrook (1–2)		Qualcomm Stadium	16,534	32–24	W2
57	June 4	@ Padres	3–1	**Rueter** (7–3)	Jones (3-4)	**Nen** (15)	Qualcomm Stadium	23,567	33–24	W3
58	June 5	@ Padres	12–2	**Jensen** (5–5)	Tankersley (1–2)		Qualcomm Stadium	21,498	34–24	W4
59	June 7	@ Yankees	1–2	Mussina (9–2)	**Hernández** (5–6)	Rivera (18)	Yankee Stadium	55,053	34–25	L1
60	June 8	@ Yankees	4–3	**Schmidt** (2–1)	Rivera (1–3)	**Nen** (16)	Yankee Stadium	55,194	35–25	W1
61	June 9	@ Yankees	2–4	Clemens (8–2)	**Rodríguez** (1–3)		Yankee Stadium	55,335	35–26	L1
62	June 10	@ Blue Jays	5–6	Thurman (1–1)	**Rueter** (7–4)	Escobar (13)	SkyDome	18,081	35–27	L2
63	June 11	@ Blue Jays	9–2	**Jensen** (6–5)	Lyon (1–4)		SkyDome	20,228	36–27	W1
64	June 12	@ Blue Jays	6–3	**Hernández** (6–6)	Halladay (7–3)	**Nen** (17)	SkyDome	21,106	37–27	W2
65	June 14	Athletics	2–3	Hudson (4–6)	**Schmidt** (2–2)	Koch (14)	**Pacific Bell Park**	41,457	37–28	L1
66	June 15	Athletics	6–2	**Zerbe** (2–0)	Harang (2–2)		**Pacific Bell Park**	41,298	38–28	W1
67	June 16	Athletics	1–2	Zito (9–2)	**Rueter** (7–5)	Koch (15)	**Pacific Bell Park**	41,550	38–29	L1
68	June 18	Devil Rays	3–8	Kennedy (5–5)	**Hernández** (6–7)		**Pacific Bell Park**	36,869	38–30	L2
69	June 19	Devil Rays	8–0	**Schmidt** (3–2)	Rupe (5–9)		**Pacific Bell Park**	35,909	39–30	W1
70	June 20	Devil Rays	10–2	**Ortiz** (6–4)	Sturtze (0–8)		**Pacific Bell Park**	39,101	40–30	W2
71	June 21	Orioles	4–3	**Rodríguez** (2–3)	Bauer (3–3)	**Nen** (18)	**Pacific Bell Park**	40,634	41–30	W3
72	June 22	Orioles	2–4	Driskill (5–0)	**Jensen** (6–6)	Julio (14)	**Pacific Bell Park**	41,269	41–31	L1
73	June 23	Orioles	1–3	Johnson (2–5)	**Hernández** (6–8)	Julio (15)	**Pacific Bell Park**	41,980	41–32	L2
74	June 24	@ Padres	7–6	**Worrell** (4–0)	Hoffman (1-1)	**Nen** (19)	Qualcomm Stadium	17,475	42–32	W1
75	June 25	@ Padres	7–10	Myers (1-0)	**Rodríguez** (2–4)	Hoffman (20)	Qualcomm Stadium	15,856	42–33	L1
76	June 26	Padres	6–5 (12)	**Witasick** (1–0)	Myers (1-1)		**Pacific Bell Park**	40,037	43–33	W1
77	June 27	Padres	11–6	**Jensen** (7–6)	Middlebrook (1-3)	**Nen** (20)	**Pacific Bell Park**	39,519	44–33	W2
78	June 28	@ Athletics	6–10	Mulder (9–4)	**Hernández** (6–9)		Network Associates Coliseum	46,345	44–34	L1
79	June 29	@ Athletics	5–3	**Schmidt** (4–2)	Lidle (2–7)	**Nen** (21)	Network Associates Coliseum	53,501	45–34	W1
80	June 30	@ Athletics	0–7	Hudson (6-7)	**Ortiz** (6–5)		Network Associates Coliseum	54,123	45–35	L1

July (14–13) (Home: 6–7; Road: 8–6)

#	Date	Opponent	Score	Win	Loss	Save	Stadium	Attendance	Record	Report
81	July 1	@ Rockies	8–6	**Rodríguez** (3–4)	Jiménez (2–5)	**Nen** (22)	Coors Field	31,115	46–35	W1
82	July 2	@ Rockies	18–5	**Jensen** (8–6)	Neagle (4–6)		Coors Field	30,838	47–35	W2
83	July 3	@ Rockies	4–14	Jennings (9–4)	**Hernández** (6–10)		Coors Field	48,504	47–36	L1
84	July 4	@ Diamondbacks	3–6	Anderson (4–7)	**Schmidt** (4–3)	Kim (22)	Bank One Ballpark	45,686	47–37	L2
85	July 5	@ Diamondbacks	1–2	Schilling (14–3)	**Ortiz** (6–6)		Bank One Ballpark	45,211	47–38	L3
86	July 6	@ Diamondbacks	3–2	**Worrell** (5–0)	Mantei (1–1)	**Nen** (23)	Bank One Ballpark	47,687	48–38	W1
87	July 7	@ Diamondbacks	5–2	**Jensen** (9–6)	Helling (7–7)	**Nen** (24)	Bank One Ballpark	41,1400	49–38	W2
88	July 11	Rockies	3–2	**Worrell** (6–0)	Jiménez (2–6)		**Pacific Bell Park**	39,644	50–38	W3
89	July 12	Rockies	9–0	**Hernández** (7–10)	Hampton (5–10)		**Pacific Bell Park**	40,963	51–38	W4
90	July 13	Rockies	6–1	**Schmidt** (5–3)	Thomson (7–8)		**Pacific Bell Park**	41,434	52–38	W5
91	July 14	Rockies	3–5	Chacon (4–6)	**Rueter** (7–6)		**Pacific Bell Park**	41,980	52–39	L1
92	July 15	Diamondbacks	6–3	**Jensen** (10–6)	Helling (7–8)		**Pacific Bell Park**	41,645	53–39	W1
93	July 16	Diamondbacks	3–5	Johnson (13-3)	**Rodríguez** (3–5)	Kim (26)	**Pacific Bell Park**	41,936	53–40	L1
94	July 17	@ Cardinals	5–4	**Worrell** (7–0)	Veres (3–5)	**Nen** (25)	Busch Stadium	44,355	54–40	W1
95	July 18	@ Cardinals	1–5	Morris (11–6)	**Schmidt** (5–4)		Busch Stadium	44,118	54–41	L1
96	July 19	@ Dodgers	3–2 (12)	**Nen** (4–0)	Mota (1–1)	–	Dodger Stadium	53,033	55–41	W1
97	July 20	@ Dodgers	2–4	Quantrill (2–3)	**Rodríguez** (3–6)	Gagne (34)	Dodger Stadium	50,093	55–42	L1
98	July 21	@ Dodgers	6–4	**Ortiz** (7–6)	Carrara (5-3)	**Nen** (26)	Dodger Stadium	54,344	56–42	W1
99	July 22	Cardinals	3–5	Hackman (3–3)	**Worrell** (7–1)	Isringhausen (23)	**Pacific Bell Park**	40,607	56–43	L1
100	July 23	Cardinals	0–4	Morris (12–6)	**Schmidt** (5–5)		**Pacific Bell Park**	40,453	56–44	L2
101	July 24	Cardinals	6–4	**Rueter** (8–6)	Benes (0-3)	**Nen** (27)	**Pacific Bell Park**	41,005	57–44	W1
102	July 25	Cardinals	3–4	Smith (4–1)	**Jensen** (10–7)	Isringhausen (24)	**Pacific Bell Park**	41,503	57–45	L1
103	July 26	Dodgers	6–11	Nomo (10–6)	**Ortiz** (7–7)	–	**Pacific Bell Park**	41,675	57–46	L2
104	July 27	Dodgers	1–5	Daal (8–5)	**Hernández** (7–11)	–	**Pacific Bell Park**	41,814	57–47	L3
105	July 28	Dodgers	3–1	**Schmidt** (6–5)	Ashby (7-9)	**Nen** (28)	**Pacific Bell Park**	41,642	58–47	W1
106	July 30	@ Phillies	10–3	**Rueter** (9–6)	Myers (1–1)		Veterans Stadium	27,330	59–47	W2
107	July 31	@ Phillies	6–8	Timlin (2–3)	**Brohawn** (0–1)	Mesa (29)	Veterans Stadium	22,595	59–48	L1

August (18–10) (Home: 8–4; Road: 10–6)

#	Date	Opponent	Score	Win	Loss	Save	Stadium	Attendance	Record	Report
108	August 1	@ Phillies	1–2	Wolf (7–7)	**Ortiz** (7–8)	Mesa (30)	Veterans Stadium	20,380	59–49	L2
109	August 2	@ Pirates	5–6	Boehringer (4–3)	**Nen** (4–1)		PNC Park	28,203	59–50	L3
110	August 3	@ Pirates	11–6	**Schmidt** (7–5)	Wells (10–9)		PNC Park	38,275	60–50	W1
111	August 4	@ Pirates	10–5	**Rueter** (10–6)	Benson (4–6)		PNC Park	31,398	61–50	W2
112	August 6	Cubs	11–10	**Worrell** (8–1)	Farnsworth (3–4)	**Nen** (29)	**Pacific Bell Park**	41,991	62–50	W3
113	August 7	Cubs	4–3 (10)	**Nen** (5–1)	Alfonseca (1–3)		**Pacific Bell Park**	41,408	63–50	W4
114	August 8	Cubs	3–9	Clement (9–8)	**Hernández** (7–12)		**Pacific Bell Park**	41,617	63–51	L1
115	August 9	Pirates	3–4	Wells (11–9)	**Schmidt** (7–6)	Williams (34)	**Pacific Bell Park**	41,897	63–52	L2
116	August 10	Pirates	8–3	**Aybar** (1–0)	Lincoln (0–3)		**Pacific Bell Park**	41,146	64–52	W1
117	August 11	Pirates	5–4 (11)	**Nen** (6–1)	Williams (1–3)		**Pacific Bell Park**	41,479	65–52	W2
118	August 13	@ Braves	7–2	**Ortiz** (8–8)	Maddux (11–4)		Turner Field	39,794	66–52	W3
119	August 14	@ Braves	0–1	Glavine (16–6)	**Hernández** (7–13)	Smoltz (42)	Turner Field	31,039	66–53	L1
120	August 15	@ Braves	3–3 (10)	**Game called (rain)** (game was not made up, tie does not count in record)			Turner Field	35,340	66–53	T1
121	August 16	@ Marlins	2–4	Tejera (8–5)	**Rueter** (10–7)	Looper (6)	Pro Player Stadium	14,724	66–54	L1
122	August 17	@ Marlins	3–7	Beckett (5–6)	**Jensen** (10–8)		Pro Player Stadium	20,926	66–55	L2
123	August 18	@ Marlins	0–3	Burnett (12–9)	**Ortiz** (8–9)		Pro Player Stadium	11,158	66–56	L3
124	August 19	@ Marlins	3–0	**Hernández** (8–13)	Tavárez (8–10)		Pro Player Stadium	7,100	67–56	W1
125	August 20	Mets	1–0	**Schmidt** (8–6)	Leiter (10–10)		**Pacific Bell Park**	41,283	68–56	W2
126	August 21	Mets	3–1	**Rueter** (11–7)	Thomson (7–11)	**Nen** (30)	**Pacific Bell Park**	41,021	69–56	W3
127	August 22	Mets	3–1	**Jensen** (11–8)	Bacsik (2–1)	**Nen** (31)	**Pacific Bell Park**	41,207	70–56	W4
128	August 23	Expos	2–7	Ohka (11–6)	**Ortiz** (8–10)	Eischen (1)	**Pacific Bell Park**	40,879	70–57	L1
129	August 24	Expos	2–7	Colón (17–6)	**Hernández** (8–14)	Stewart (17)	**Pacific Bell Park**	41,165	70–58	L2
130	August 25	Expos	8–4	**Schmidt** (9–6)	Vazquez (8–11)		**Pacific Bell Park**	41,408	71–58	W1
131	August 26	@ Rockies	4–3	**Rodríguez** (4–6)	Jones (1–3)	**Nen** (32)	Coors Field	26,877	72–58	W2
132	August 27	@ Rockies	7–4	**Rodríguez** (5–6)	Jones (1–4)	**Nen** (33)	Coors Field	26,592	73–58	W3
133	August 28	@ Rockies	9–1	**Ortiz** (9–10)	Jennings (15-6)		Coors Field	27,080	74–58	W4
134	August 29	@ Rockies	10–6	**Hernández** (9–14)	Hampton (7-14)		Coors Field	26,330	75–58	W5
135	August 30	@ Diamondbacks	7–6	**Schmidt** (10–6)	Johnson (19-5)	**Nen** (34)	Bank One Ballpark	47,366	76–58	W6
136	August 31	@ Diamondbacks	5–0	**Rueter** (12–7)	Schilling (21-5)		Bank One Ballpark	41,915	77–58	W7

September (18–8) (Home: 12–4; Road: 6–4)

#	Date	Opponent	Score	Win	Loss	Save	Stadium	Attendance	Record	Report
137	September 1	@ Diamondbacks	6–7	Kim (8–2)	**Nen** (6–2)		Bank One Ballpark	41,707	77–59	L1
138	September 3	Rockies	4–2	**Ortiz** (10–10)	Hampton (7–15)	**Nen** (35)	**Pacific Bell Park**	33,483	78–59	W1
139	September 4	Rockies	1–2	Neagle (8–9)	**Hernández** (9–15)	Jiménez (36)	**Pacific Bell Park**	34,342	78–60	L1
140	September 5	Diamondbacks	5–8	Schilling (22–5)	**Schmidt** (10–7)		**Pacific Bell Park**	37,995	78–61	L2
141	September 6	Diamondbacks	1–0	**Rodríguez** (6–6)	Fetters (3–1)		**Pacific Bell Park**	40,782	79–61	W1
142	September 7	Diamondbacks	4–3	**Rodríguez** (7–6)	Kim (8–3)		**Pacific Bell Park**	41,016	80–61	W2
143	September 8	Diamondbacks	3–1	**Ortiz** (11–10)	Anderson (6–11)	**Nen** (36)	**Pacific Bell Park**	41,100	81–61	W3
144	September 9	Dodgers	6–5	**Hernández** (10–15)	Perez (13–9)	**Nen** (37)	**Pacific Bell Park**	40,740	82–61	W4
145	September 10	Dodgers	5–2	**Schmidt** (11–7)	Brown (3–4)	**Nen** (38)	**Pacific Bell Park**	41,325	83–61	W5
146	September 11	Dodgers	3–7	Nomo (14–6)	**Rueter** (12–8)		**Pacific Bell Park**	41,310	83–62	L1
147	September 12	@ Padres	2–3 (10)	Hoffman (2–4)	**Worrell** (8–2)		Qualcomm Stadium	16,143	83–63	L2
148	September 13	@ Padres	10–3	**Ortiz** (12–10)	Lawrence (12–11)		Qualcomm Stadium	25,857	84–63	W1
149	September 14	Padres	12–4	**Hernández** (11–15)	Tomko (9–10)		**Pacific Bell Park**	41,506	85–63	W2
150	September 15	Padres	1–4	Peavy (6–7)	**Ainsworth** (1–2)	Hoffman (37)	**Pacific Bell Park**	41,116	85–64	L1
151	September 16	@ Dodgers	6–7	Nomo (15–6)	**Schmidt** (11–8)	Gagne (49)	Dodger Stadium	35,767	85–65	L2
152	September 17	@ Dodgers	6–4	**Rueter** (13–8)	Daal (11–9)	**Nen** (39)	Dodger Stadium	40,161	86–65	W1
153	September 18	@ Dodgers	7–4	**Ortiz** (13–10)	Ellis (0–1)	–	Dodger Stadium	40,164	87–65	W2
154	September 19	@ Dodgers	3–6	Perez (15–9)	**Hernández** (11–16)	–	Dodger Stadium	43,921	87–66	L1
155	September 20	@ Brewers	5–1	**Jensen** (12–8)	Neugebauer (1–7)		Miller Park	29,271	88–66	W1
156	September 21	@ Brewers	3–1	**Schmidt** (12–8)	Diggins (0–3)	**Nen** (40)	Miller Park	28,119	89–66	W2
157	September 22	@ Brewers	3–1	**Rodríguez** (8–6)	Vizcaino (5–2)	**Nen** (41)	Miller Park	34,856	90–66	W3
158	September 24	Padres	12–3	**Ortiz** (14–10)	Perez (3–5)		**Pacific Bell Park**	37,772	91–66	W4
159	September 25	Padres	6–0	**Hernández** (12–16)	Condrey (1–2)		**Pacific Bell Park**	38,001	92–66	W5
160	September 27	Astros	2–1	**Schmidt** (13–8)	Miller (15–4)	**Nen** (42)	**Pacific Bell Park**	41,385	93–66	W6
161	September 28	Astros	5–2	**Rueter** (14–8)	Robertson (0–2)	**Nen** (43)	**Pacific Bell Park**	41,045	94–66	W7
162	September 29	Astros	7–0	**Jensen** (13–8)	Oswalt (19–9)		**Pacific Bell Park**	40,944	95–66	W8

=== Postseason ===
2002 Postseason Game Log
National League Division Series (3–2)

Game	Date	Opponent	Score	Win	Loss	Save	Stadium	Attendance	Series	Report
1 NLDS	October 2	@ Braves	8–5	**Ortiz** (1–0)	Glavine (0–1)	**Nen** (1)	Turner Field	41,903	1–0	W1
2 NLDS	October 3	@ Braves	3–7	Milwood (1–0)	**Rueter** (0–1)		Turner Field	47,167	1–1	L1
3 NLDS	October 5	Braves	2–10	Maddux (1–0)	**Schmidt** (0–1)		**Pacific Bell Park**	43,043	1–2	L2
4 NLDS	October 6	Braves	8–3	**Hernández** (1–0)	Glavine (0–2)		**Pacific Bell Park**	43,070	2–2	W1
5 NLDS	October 7	@ Braves	3–1	**Ortiz** (2–0)	Milwood (1–1)	**Nen** (2)	Turner Field	45,203	3–2	W2

National League Championship Series (4–1)

Game	Date	Opponent	Score	Win	Loss	Save	Stadium	Attendance	Series	Report
1 NLCS	October 9	@ Cardinals	9–6	**Rueter** (1–0)	Morris (0–1)	**Nen** (1)	Busch Stadium	52,175	1–0	W1
2 NLCS	October 10	@ Cardinals	4–1	**Schmidt** (1–0)	Williams (0–1)	**Nen** (2)	Busch Stadium	52,195	2–0	W1
3 NLCS	October 12	Cardinals	4–5	Finley (1–0)	**Witasick** (0–1)	Isringhausen (1)	**Pacific Bell Park**	42,177	2–1	L1
4 NLCS	October 13	Cardinals	4–3	**Worrell** (1–0)	White (0–1)	**Nen** (3)	**Pacific Bell Park**	42,676	3–1	W1
5 NLCS	October 14	Cardinals	2–1	**Worrell** (2–0)	Morris (0–2)		**Pacific Bell Park**	42,673	4–1	W2

World Series (3–4)

Game	Date	Opponent	Score	Win	Loss	Save	Stadium	Attendance	Series	Report
1 WS	October 19	@ Angels	4–3	**Schmidt** (1–0)	Washburn (0–1)	**Nen** (1)	Edison International Field of Anaheim	44,603	1–0	W1
2 WS	October 20	@ Angels	10–11	Rodríguez (1–0)	**Rodríguez** (0–1)	Percival (1)	Edison International Field of Anaheim	44,584	1–1	L1
3 WS	October 22	Angels	4–10	Ortiz (1–0)	**Hernández** (0–1)		**Pacific Bell Park**	42,707	1–2	L2
4 WS	October 23	Angels	4–3	**Worrell** (1–0)	Rodríguez (1–1)	**Nen** (2)	**Pacific Bell Park**	42,703	2–2	W1
5 WS	October 24	Angels	16–4	**Schmidt** (2–0)	Washburn (0–2)		**Pacific Bell Park**	42,713	3–2	W2
6 WS	October 26	@ Angels	5–6	Donnelly (1–0)	**Worrell** (1–1)	Percival (2)	Edison International Field of Anaheim	44,506	3–3	L1
7 WS	October 27	@ Angels	1–4	Lackey (1–0)	**Hernández** (0–2)	Percival (3)	Edison International Field of Anaheim	44,598	3–4	L2

=== Roster ===
2002 San Francisco Giants
**Roster**
**Pitchers**: 22 Kurt Ainsworth; 50 Manny Aybar; 51 Troy Brohawn; 40 Jason Christiansen; 49 Scott Eyre; 38 Aaron Fultz; 61 Liván Hernández; 43 Ryan Jensen; 36 Joe Nathan; 31 Robb Nen; 48 Russ Ortiz; 47 Félix Rodríguez; 46 Kirk Rueter; 29 Jason Schmidt; 26 Jay Witasick; 45 Tim Worrell; 41 Chad Zerbe	**Catchers**: 52 Trey Lunsford; 33 Benito Santiago; 9 Yorvit Torrealba; **Infielders**: 35 Rich Aurilia; 28 David Bell; 39 Pedro Feliz; 21 Jeff Kent; 34 Ramón Martínez; 37 Damon Minor; 32 Bill Mueller; 2 Cody Ransom; 6 J. T. Snow	**Outfielders**: 7 Marvin Benard; 25 Barry Bonds; 23 Shawon Dunston; 8 Tom Goodwin; 1 Kenny Lofton; 8 Calvin Murray; 16 Reggie Sanders; 5 Tsuyoshi Shinjo; 14 Tony Torcato	**Manager**: 12 Dusty Baker; **Coaches**: 20 Gene Clines (hitting); 15 Sonny Jackson (third base); 18 Joe Lefebvre (first base); 59 Juan Lopez (bullpen); 19 Dave Righetti (pitching); 10 Ron Wotus (bench)

== Player stats ==
=== Batting ===
==== Starters by position ====
Note: Pos = Position; G = Games played; AB = At bats; H = Hits; Avg. = Batting average; HR = Home runs; RBI = Runs batted in

Pos	Player	G	AB	H	Avg.	HR	RBI
C	Benito Santiago	126	478	133	.278	16	74
1B	J.T. Snow	143	422	104	.246	6	53
2B	Jeff Kent	152	623	195	.313	37	108
SS	Rich Aurilia	133	538	138	.257	15	61
3B	David Bell	154	552	144	.261	20	73
LF	Barry Bonds	143	403	149	.370	46	110
CF	Tsuyoshi Shinjo	118	362	86	.238	9	37
RF	Reggie Sanders	140	505	126	.250	23	85

==== Other batters ====
Note: G = Games played; AB = At bats; H = Hits; Avg. = Batting average; HR = Home runs; RBI = Runs batted in

Player	G	AB	H	Avg.	HR	RBI
Ramón Martínez	72	181	49	.271	4	25
Kenny Lofton	46	180	48	.267	3	9
Damon Minor	83	173	41	.237	10	24
Tom Goodwin	78	154	40	.260	1	17
Shawon Dunston	72	147	34	.231	1	9
Pedro Feliz	67	146	37	.253	2	13
Yorvit Torrealba	53	136	38	.279	2	14
Marvin Benard	65	123	34	.276	1	13
Bill Mueller	8	13	2	.154	0	1
Calvin Murray	11	12	0	.000	0	0
Tony Torcato	5	11	3	.273	0	0
Cody Ransom	7	3	2	.667	0	1
Trey Lunsford	3	3	2	.667	0	1

=== Pitching ===
==== Starting pitchers ====
Note: G = Games pitched; IP = Innings pitched; W = Wins; L = Losses; ERA = Earned run average; SO = Strikeouts

Player	G	IP	W	L	ERA	SO
Liván Hernández	33	216.0	12	16	4.38	134
Russ Ortiz	33	214.1	14	10	3.61	137
Kirk Rueter	33	203.2	14	8	3.23	76
Jason Schmidt	29	185.1	13	8	3.45	196
Ryan Jensen	32	171.2	13	8	4.51	105

==== Other pitchers ====
Note: G = Games pitched; IP = Innings pitched; W = Wins; L = Losses; ERA = Earned run average; SO = Strikeouts

Player	G	IP	W	L	ERA	SO
Kurt Ainsworth	6	25.2	1	2	2.10	15

==== Relief pitchers ====
Note: G = Games pitched; W = Wins; L = Losses; SV = Saves; ERA = Earned run average; SO = Strikeouts

Player	G	W	L	SV	ERA	SO
Robb Nen	68	6	2	43	2.20	81
Tim Worrell	80	8	2	0	2.25	55
Félix Rodríguez	71	8	6	0	4.17	58
Chad Zerbe	50	2	0	0	3.04	26
Jay Witasick	44	1	0	0	2.37	54
Aaron Fultz	43	2	2	0	4.79	31
Scott Eyre	21	0	0	0	1.59	7
Manny Aybar	15	1	0	0	2.51	11
Troy Brohawn	11	0	1	0	6.35	3
Jason Christiansen	6	0	1	0	5.40	1
Joe Nathan	4	0	0	0	0.00	2

== National League Divisional Playoffs ==
=== San Francisco Giants vs. Atlanta Braves ===
San Francisco wins the series, 3-2

Game	Home	Score	Visitor	Score	Date	Stadium	Series
1	Atlanta	5	San Francisco	8	October 2	Turner Field	1-0 (SFO)
2	Atlanta	7	San Francisco	3	October 3	Turner Field	1-1
3	San Francisco	2	Atlanta	10	October 5	Pacific Bell Park	2-1 (ATL)
4	San Francisco	8	Atlanta	3	October 6	Pacific Bell Park	2-2
5	Atlanta	1	San Francisco	3	October 7	Turner Field	3-2 (SFO)

== National League Championship Series ==
=== Game 1 ===
October 9: Busch Stadium, St. Louis, Missouri

Team	1	2	3	4	5	6	7	8	9	R	H	E
San Francisco	1	4	1	0	1	2	0	0	0	9	11	0
St. Louis	0	1	0	0	2	2	0	1	0	6	11	0
WP: Kirk Rueter (1-0) LP: Matt Morris (0-1) Sv: Robb Nen (1); Home runs: SFG: Kenny Lofton (1), David Bell (1), Benito Santiago (1); STL: Albert Pujols (1), Miguel Cairo (1), J. D. Drew (1)

=== Game 2 ===
October 10: Busch Stadium, St. Louis, Missouri

Team	1	2	3	4	5	6	7	8	9	R	H	E
San Francisco	1	0	0	0	2	0	0	0	1	4	7	0
St. Louis	0	0	0	0	0	0	0	1	0	1	6	0
WP: Jason Schmidt (1-0) LP: Woody Williams (0-1) Sv: Robb Nen (2); Home runs: SFG: Rich Aurilia 2 (2); STL: Eduardo Pérez (1)

=== Game 3 ===
October 12: Pac Bell Park, San Francisco

Team	1	2	3	4	5	6	7	8	9	R	H	E
St. Louis	0	0	2	1	1	1	0	0	0	5	6	1
San Francisco	0	1	0	0	3	0	0	0	0	4	10	0
WP: Chuck Finley (1-0) LP: Jay Witasick (0-1) Sv: Jason Isringhausen (1); Home runs: STL: Mike Matheny (1), Jim Edmonds (1), Eli Marrero (1); SFG: Barry Bonds (1)

=== Game 4 ===
October 13: Pac Bell Park, San Francisco

Team	1	2	3	4	5	6	7	8	9	R	H	E
St. Louis	2	0	0	0	0	0	0	0	1	3	12	0
San Francisco	0	0	0	0	0	2	0	2	X	4	4	1
WP: Tim Worrell (1-0) LP: Rick White (0-1) Sv: Robb Nen (3); Home runs: STL: None; SFG: Benito Santiago (2)

=== Game 5 ===
October 14: Pac Bell Park, San Francisco

Team	1	2	3	4	5	6	7	8	9	R	H	E
St. Louis	0	0	0	0	0	1	0	0	0	1	9	0
San Francisco	0	0	0	0	0	0	0	1	1	2	7	0
WP: Tim Worrell (2-0) LP: Matt Morris (0-2)

== World Series ==
=== Game 1 ===
October 19, 2002 at Edison International Field of Anaheim in Anaheim, California

San Francisco won 4–3 at Edison International Field of Anaheim (now Angel Stadium of Anaheim) to take a 1–0 lead. Barry Bonds hit a home run in his first career World Series at-bat. He was one of three Giants to homer in the game (the other two were Reggie Sanders and JT Snow). Troy Glaus hit two home runs for the Angels.

Team	1	2	3	4	5	6	7	8	9	R	H	E
San Francisco	0	2	0	0	2	0	0	0	0	4	6	0
Anaheim	0	1	0	0	2	0	0	0	0	3	9	0
WP: Jason Schmidt (1-0) LP: Jarrod Washburn (0-1) Sv: Robb Nen (1); Home runs: SFG: Barry Bonds (1), Reggie Sanders (1), J. T. Snow (1); ANA: Troy Glaus 2 (2)

=== Game 2 ===
October 20, 2002 at Edison International Field of Anaheim in Anaheim, California

Anaheim won 11–10 at home in a game where the lead kept fluctuating between the two teams, tying up the series. Bonds again hit a mammoth homer with two outs in the 9th inning, off of Troy Percival. The biggest home run of the night, however, was hit by Tim Salmon, a longtime Angel, with two outs and one on in the bottom of the 8th. The dramatic blast broke a 9–9 tie and ultimately won the game for the Angels.

Team	1	2	3	4	5	6	7	8	9	R	H	E
San Francisco	0	4	1	0	4	0	0	0	1	10	12	1
Anaheim	5	2	0	0	1	1	0	2	X	11	16	1
WP: Francisco Rodríguez (1-0) LP: Félix Rodríguez (0-1) Sv: Troy Percival (1); Home runs: SFG: Reggie Sanders (2), David Bell (1), Jeff Kent (1), Barry Bonds (2); ANA: Tim Salmon 2 (2)

=== Game 3 ===
October 22, 2002 at Pacific Bell Park in San Francisco

Anaheim won 10–4 in the first game at Pacific Bell Park (now Oracle Park). The Angels batted around twice without a home run in either of their 4-run innings. Barry Bonds hit another home run, becoming the first man to homer in his first three World Series games.

Team	1	2	3	4	5	6	7	8	9	R	H	E
Anaheim	0	0	4	4	0	1	0	1	0	10	16	0
San Francisco	1	0	0	0	3	0	0	0	0	4	6	2
WP: Ramón Ortiz (1-0) LP: Liván Hernández (0-1); Home runs: ANA: None; SFG: Rich Aurilia (1), Barry Bonds (3)

=== Game 4 ===
October 23, 2002 at Pacific Bell Park in San Francisco

San Francisco scored a 4–3 victory to tie the series. NLCS MVP Benito Santiago tied the game with a single in the 5th inning after the Angels walked Barry Bonds with a runner on second and two outs. David Bell put the Giants ahead with an RBI single in the bottom of the 8th. The run was unearned due to Anaheim catcher Bengie Molina's passed ball during the previous at-bat, allowing J. T. Snow to move to second.

Team	1	2	3	4	5	6	7	8	9	R	H	E
Anaheim	0	1	2	0	0	0	0	0	0	3	10	1
San Francisco	0	0	0	0	3	0	0	1	X	4	12	1
WP: Tim Worrell (1-0) LP: Francisco Rodríguez (1-1) Sv: Robb Nen (2); Home runs: ANA: Troy Glaus (3); SFG: None

=== Game 5 ===
October 24, 2002 at Pacific Bell Park in San Francisco

San Francisco took a 16–4 blowout win in a game in which the Angels never led. The most well-known moment in this game occurred when Giants first baseman J. T. Snow scored off a Kenny Lofton triple. 3-year-old batboy Darren Baker, son of Giants manager Dusty Baker, ran to home plate to collect Lofton's bat before the play was completed and was quickly lifted by the jacket by Snow as he crossed the plate, with David Bell close on his heels. Had Snow not acted quickly, Darren could have been seriously injured.

Team	1	2	3	4	5	6	7	8	9	R	H	E
Anaheim	0	0	0	0	3	1	0	0	0	4	10	2
San Francisco	3	3	0	0	0	2	4	4	X	16	16	0
WP: Jason Schmidt (2-0) LP: Jarrod Washburn (0-2); Home runs: ANA: None; SFG: Jeff Kent 2 (3), Rich Aurilia (2)

=== Game 6 ===
October 26, 2002 at Edison International Field of Anaheim in Anaheim, California

The turning point in the series came in Game 6. Leading 5–0 with one out in the bottom of the 7th inning, eight outs away from the Giants' first World Series title in San Francisco, Giants manager Dusty Baker pulled starting pitcher Russ Ortiz for setup man Félix Rodríguez after Ortiz gave up consecutive singles to third baseman Troy Glaus and designated hitter Brad Fullmer. In a widely publicized move, Baker gave Ortiz the game ball as he sent him back to the dugout. During the pitching change the Rally Monkey came on the JumboTron, sending 45,037 Angels fans into a frenzy. Angel first baseman Scott Spiezio came to the plate and fouled off pitch after pitch before finally hitting a three-run home run that barely cleared the wall in right field. The rally continued in the 8th inning, as Angel center fielder Darin Erstad hit a leadoff line-drive home run, followed by consecutive singles by Tim Salmon and Garret Anderson (Chone Figgins pinch ran for Salmon). When Bonds misplayed Anderson's shallow left field bloop single, Figgins and Anderson took third and second respectively. With no outs, two runners in scoring position and now only a 5–4 lead, Baker brought in closer Robb Nen to pitch to Glaus, hoping that Nen could induce a strikeout that might yet preserve the Giants' slim lead. However, Glaus slugged a double to the left-center field gap over Bonds' head to drive in the tying and winning runs. In the 9th inning, Angels closer Troy Percival struck out Rich Aurilia to preserve the 6–5 victory in front of the jubilant home crowd.

Team	1	2	3	4	5	6	7	8	9	R	H	E
San Francisco	0	0	0	0	3	1	1	0	0	5	8	1
Anaheim	0	0	0	0	0	0	3	3	X	6	10	1
WP: Brendan Donnelly (1-0) LP: Tim Worrell (1-1) Sv: Troy Percival (2); Home runs: SFG: Shawon Dunston (1), Barry Bonds (4); ANA: Scott Spiezio (1), Darin Erstad (1)

=== Game 7 ===
October 27, 2002 at Edison International Field of Anaheim in Anaheim, California

Game 7 proved to be somewhat anticlimactic after the drama of Game 6. The Giants scored the first run on a sacrifice, but the Angels responded with a run-scoring double from catcher Bengie Molina and a three-run double to right field from left fielder Garret Anderson to open a 4–1 lead. Rookie starting pitcher John Lackey maintained that lead. In the 9th inning, closer Troy Percival provided some tense moments as he opened the inning by putting two Giants on base, with only one out. But Tsuyoshi Shinjo – the first Japanese player in a World Series game – struck out swinging, and Kenny Lofton, also representing the tying run, flied out to Darin Erstad in right-center field to end the Series. The Angels won Game 7, 4–1, to claim their franchise's first and so far only World Series Championship. John Lackey became the first rookie pitcher to win a World Series game 7 since 1909.

Team	1	2	3	4	5	6	7	8	9	R	H	E
San Francisco	0	1	0	0	0	0	0	0	0	1	6	0
Anaheim	0	1	3	0	0	0	0	0	X	4	5	0
WP: John Lackey (1-0) LP: Liván Hernández (0-2) Sv: Troy Percival (3)

== Awards and honors ==
- David Bell 3B, Willie Mac Award
- Barry Bonds, National League Most Valuable Player
- Barry Bonds, Major League record (since broken), highest on-base percentage in one season (.582)
- Benito Santiago, 2002 NLCS MVP

All-Star Game (played July 9, 2002)

- Barry Bonds
- Benito Santiago
- Rob Nen

== Farm system ==
Level	Team	League	Manager
AAA	Fresno Grizzlies	Pacific Coast League	Lenn Sakata
AA	Shreveport Swamp Dragons	Texas League	Mario Mendoza
A	San Jose Giants	California League	Bill Hayes
A	Hagerstown Suns	South Atlantic League	Mike Ramsey
A-Short Season	Salem-Keizer Volcanoes	Northwest League	Fred Stanley
Rookie	AZL Giants	Arizona League	Bert Hunter
