= 2002 National League Division Series =

American baseball games

Teams
| Team (Wins) | | Manager | Season |
| San Francisco Giants (3) | | Dusty Baker | 95–66 (.590), GB: 2 1/2 |
| Atlanta Braves (2) | | Bobby Cox | 101–59 (.631), GA: 19 |
- Dates: October 2–7
- Television: ABC Family (Game 1); Fox (Games 2, 4–5); FX (Game 3)
- TV announcers: Dave O'Brien and Tony Gwynn (Game 1); Thom Brennaman and Steve Lyons (Games 2, 4); Josh Lewin and Steve Lyons (Game 3); Joe Buck and Tim McCarver (Game 5)
- Radio: ESPN
- Radio announcers: Gary Cohen and Rob Dibble
- Umpires: Games 1–2 & 5: Mike Reilly, Paul Emmel, Ángel Hernández, Jerry Layne, Tim Tschida, Ted Barrett; Games 3–4: Bruce Froemming, Bill Miller, Ron Kulpa, Gary Darling, Steve Rippley, Mark Hirschbeck

Teams
| Team (Wins) | | Manager | Season |
| St. Louis Cardinals (3) | | Tony La Russa | 97–65 (.599), GA: 13 |
| Arizona Diamondbacks (0) | | Bob Brenly | 98–64 (.605), GA: 2 1/2 |
- Dates: October 1–5
- Television: ABC Family
- TV announcers: Chris Berman and Rick Sutcliffe (Games 1–2); Jon Miller and Joe Morgan (Game 3)
- Radio: ESPN
- Radio announcers: Jim Durham and Buck Showalter
- Umpires: Games 1–2: Bruce Froemming, Bill Miller, Ron Kulpa, Gary Darling, Steve Rippley, Mark Hirschbeck; Game 3: Mike Reilly, Paul Emmel, Ángel Hernández, Jerry Layne, Tim Tschida, Ted Barrett

The 2002 National League Division Series (NLDS) consisted of two best-of-five playoff series on the National League side of Major League Baseball’s 2002 postseason, began on Tuesday, October 1, and ended on Monday, October 7, with the champions of the three NL divisions—along with a "wild card" team—participating in two series.

Under MLB's playoff format, no two teams from the same division were matched up in the Division Series, regardless of whether their records would normally indicate such a matchup. Home field advantage went to the team with the better regular-season record with the exception of the wild card team, which defers home field advantage regardless of record. The matchups were:

- (1) Atlanta Braves (NL East champions) vs. (4) San Francisco Giants (Wild Card qualifier): Giants won the series, 3–2.
- (2) Arizona Diamondbacks (NL West champions) vs. (3) St. Louis Cardinals (NL Central champions): Cardinals won the series, 3–0.

The higher seeded team in each series hosts Games 1, 2, and 5 (if necessary), and the lower seeded team hosts Games 3 and 4 (if necessary).

The Cardinals and Giants went on to meet in the NL Championship Series (NLCS). The Giants became the National League champion, and lost to the American League champion Anaheim Angels in the 2002 World Series.

== Matchups ==
=== Atlanta Braves vs. San Francisco Giants ===
San Francisco won the series, 3–2.

| Game | Date | Score | Location | Time | Attendance |
|---|---|---|---|---|---|
| 1 | October 2 | San Francisco Giants – 8, Atlanta Braves – 5 | Turner Field | 3:24 | 41,903 |
| 2 | October 3 | San Francisco Giants – 3, Atlanta Braves – 7 | Turner Field | 2:58 | 47,167 |
| 3 | October 5 | Atlanta Braves – 10, San Francisco Giants – 2 | Pacific Bell Park | 3:23 | 43,043 |
| 4 | October 6 | Atlanta Braves – 3, San Francisco Giants – 8 | Pacific Bell Park | 3:03 | 43,070 |
| 5 | October 7 | San Francisco Giants – 3, Atlanta Braves – 1 | Turner Field | 3:47 | 45,203 |

=== Arizona Diamondbacks vs. St. Louis Cardinals ===
St. Louis won the series, 3–0.

| Game | Date | Score | Location | Time | Attendance |
|---|---|---|---|---|---|
| 1 | October 1 | St. Louis Cardinals – 12, Arizona Diamondbacks – 2 | Bank One Ballpark | 2:55 | 49,154 |
| 2 | October 3 | St. Louis Cardinals – 2, Arizona Diamondbacks – 1 | Bank One Ballpark | 2:55 | 48,856 |
| 3 | October 5 | Arizona Diamondbacks – 3, St. Louis Cardinals – 6 | Busch Stadium | 3:57 | 52,189 |

== Atlanta vs. San Francisco ==
The Atlanta Braves had continued to move forward in a golden era of consistency that had resulted in their eleventh consecutive division title since 1991 (with only the cancelled 1994 season being the exception), marked by consistent pitching from Tom Glavine, Greg Maddux, and Kevin Millwood (who combined for 52 wins to 25 losses) to go with John Smoltz and his league-leading 55 saves. They won over 100 games for the first since 1999, having experienced an improvement of thirteen games from the previous year. The Braves led the National League in runs allowed, ERA (3.13), and hits allowed (San Francisco led in home runs allowed). For the San Francisco Giants, this was their third postseason appearance in the past six seasons. While a five-game improvement from last year was not enough to catch the NL West title, it was enough to loom over the lone Wild Card spot, marked by ending the year with an eight-game winning streak. As for the Giants, Barry Bonds (who experienced back-to-back NLCS losses to the Braves in 1991 and 1992 as the left fielder for the Pittsburgh Pirates) continued his unprecedented run to start the 21st century. While he had less games played and home runs from the previous year, he managed to hit 46 while drawing a record of 198 walks while batting a career high .370 to coast to the Major League Baseball Most Valuable Player Award, which was his fifth as a player and second of ultimately four in a row. Right beside Bonds in offense was Jeff Kent, who hit .313 with 37 home runs with 195 hits in 152 games. While Kirk Rueter and Russ Ortiz led the Giants in wins as a pitcher (14), it was Robb Nen who served as the key star in pitching once again. In his fifth season with the Giants, he went to the All-Star Game for the third time while garnering 43 saves.

For Bonds, this was a chance to end the narrative as a playoff under-performer. Bonds, who broke the single-season home run record in 2001, entered the 2002 playoffs with just one home run in 97 career postseason at-bats.

Additionally, this was a chance for the Giants to avenge their 1993 pennant race defeat to the Braves, who blew a ten game lead in the National League West to Braves in the last two and a half months of the season, while also becoming the only team to win over 100 games and not make the playoffs in the divisional play era. It had since been referred to as the last real pennant race due to the playoff format changing the next season, which allowed a team to make the playoffs without winning the division (also known as a wild card).

=== Game 1 ===
October 2, 2002 1:00 pm (EDT) at Turner Field in Atlanta, Georgia 82 °F (28 °C), cloudy
| Team | 1 | 2 | 3 | 4 | 5 | 6 | 7 | 8 | 9 | R | H | E |
|---|---|---|---|---|---|---|---|---|---|---|---|---|
| San Francisco | 0 | 3 | 0 | 3 | 0 | 2 | 0 | 0 | 0 | 8 | 12 | 2 |
| Atlanta | 0 | 2 | 0 | 0 | 0 | 0 | 0 | 3 | 0 | 5 | 10 | 0 |
WP: Russ Ortiz (1–0) LP: Tom Glavine (0–1) Sv: Robb Nen (1); Home runs: SF: None; ATL: Gary Sheffield (1), Javy López (1); Attendance: 41,903; Boxscore

In Game 1, Russ Ortiz faced Tom Glavine. In the top of the second, after Benito Santiago and Reggie Sanders hit back-to-back one-out singles, J. T. Snow hit a two-run double, then David Bell singled Snow home to make it 3–0 Giants. Glavine would help his own cause by hitting a bases-loaded two-run single to left field that almost tied the game thanks to an error by Bonds in the bottom half of the second. In the fourth, David Bell and Russ Ortiz back-to-back one-out singles, then Kenny Lofton's RBI single and Rich Aurilia's two-run double made it 6–2 Giants. Chris Hammond relieved Glavine in the sixth and after a two-out double and intentional walk, Santiago's double scored both runners. In the bottom of the eighth Gary Sheffield's homer off Tim Worrell made it 8–3. With one on and one out, Santiago dropped a foul fly ball hit by Javy López, who then homered to make it 8–5. In the ninth, the Braves put the tying run at the plate off Robb Nen for Sheffield, but he hit into a game-ending double play.

=== Game 2 ===
October 3, 2002 4:00 pm (EDT) at Turner Field in Atlanta, Georgia 79 °F (26 °C), cloudy
| Team | 1 | 2 | 3 | 4 | 5 | 6 | 7 | 8 | 9 | R | H | E |
|---|---|---|---|---|---|---|---|---|---|---|---|---|
| San Francisco | 0 | 1 | 0 | 0 | 0 | 1 | 0 | 0 | 1 | 3 | 7 | 0 |
| Atlanta | 1 | 3 | 0 | 3 | 0 | 0 | 0 | 0 | X | 7 | 8 | 0 |
WP: Kevin Millwood (1–0) LP: Kirk Rueter (0–1); Home runs: SF: J. T. Snow (1), Rich Aurilia (1), Barry Bonds (1); ATL: Javy López (2), Vinny Castilla (1); Attendance: 47,167; Boxscore

In Game 2, Kirk Rueter faced Kevin Millwood, who was looking to keep the Braves' hopes alive in the series. The Braves struck first when Julio Franco walked with one out, moved to second on a ground out and scored on Chipper Jones's RBI single in the first, but J. T. Snow homered to tie the game in the top of the second. Back-to-back homers by Javy Lopez and Vinny Castilla made it 3–1 Braves in the bottom half. Then Mark DeRosa doubled and scored on Rafael Furcal's RBI single one out later to make it 4–1 Braves. In the fourth, DeRosa followed a leadoff single and walk with a two-run triple to knock Rueter out of the game. DeRosa then scored on a passed ball by Manny Aybar to make it 7–1 Braves. The Giants got home runs from Rich Aurilia off Millwood in the sixth and Barry Bonds in the ninth off John Smoltz, but the Braves won the game 7–3 to tie the series.

=== Game 3 ===
October 5, 2002 1:00 pm (PDT) at Pacific Bell Park in San Francisco, California 71 °F (22 °C), sunny
| Team | 1 | 2 | 3 | 4 | 5 | 6 | 7 | 8 | 9 | R | H | E |
|---|---|---|---|---|---|---|---|---|---|---|---|---|
| Atlanta | 0 | 0 | 1 | 0 | 0 | 5 | 0 | 0 | 4 | 10 | 10 | 0 |
| San Francisco | 1 | 0 | 0 | 0 | 0 | 1 | 0 | 0 | 0 | 2 | 5 | 0 |
WP: Greg Maddux (1–0) LP: Jason Schmidt (0–1); Home runs: ATL: Keith Lockhart (1); SF: Barry Bonds (2); Attendance: 43,043; Boxscore

In Game 3, Greg Maddux of the Braves faced Jason Schmidt of the Giants. In the bottom of the first, Kenny Lofton hit a leadoff single and scored on Jeff Kent's doubled to make it 1–0 Giants. In the top of the third, Rafael Furcal hit a leadoff triple and scored on a groundout by Julio Franco. The game remained tied until the sixth. With one out, three consecutive walks ended Schmidt's night. Vinny Castilla singled in two runs off Manny Aybar, then Keith Lockhart followed with a towering three-run homer to make it 6–1 Braves. Barry Bonds's homer in the bottom half made it 6–2, but the ninth saw the Braves add insurance. Two singles and a walk loaded the bases with one out off Tim Worrell. Chipper Jones hit an RBI single off Aaron Fultz, who was relieved by Robb Nen. Andruw Jones's single scored two, then one out later, Lockhart's single scored another. Kevin Gryboski retired the Giants in order in the bottom of the inning as the Braves' 10–2 win gave them a 2–1 series lead. This would be the last series lead the Braves would hold in a postseason series until winning Game 3 of the 2019 NLDS.

=== Game 4 ===
October 6, 2002 4:55 pm (PDT) at Pacific Bell Park in San Francisco, California 78 °F (26 °C), sunny
| Team | 1 | 2 | 3 | 4 | 5 | 6 | 7 | 8 | 9 | R | H | E |
|---|---|---|---|---|---|---|---|---|---|---|---|---|
| Atlanta | 0 | 0 | 0 | 0 | 1 | 2 | 0 | 0 | 0 | 3 | 9 | 0 |
| San Francisco | 2 | 2 | 3 | 0 | 1 | 0 | 0 | 0 | X | 8 | 11 | 0 |
WP: Liván Hernández (1–0) LP: Tom Glavine (0–2); Home runs: ATL: None; SF: Rich Aurilia (2); Attendance: 43,070; Boxscore

In Game 4, Glavine would be sent to the mound once again, this time facing Liván Hernández. Glavine's struggles would continue, as he allowed two singles and a walk to load the bases with no outs in the first, Barry Bonds's sacrifice fly and Benito Santiago's groundout scored a run each. Next inning, David Bell hit a leadoff single, moved to second on a sacrifice bunt, and scored on Rich Aurilia's single. Another single and intentional walk loaded the bases before Santiago walked to force in another run. Aurilia's two-out three-run homer made it 7–0 in the third, knocking Glavine out of the game. The Braves got on the board in the fifth on Rafael Furcal's RBI double with a runner on third, but the Giants got that run back in the bottom half off Damian Moss on Santiago's RBI double with two on. The Braves scored two runs in the sixth on Javy Lopez's double and Vinny Castilla's single, but nothing else as the Giants' 8–3 win forced a Game 5 in Atlanta.

=== Game 5 ===
October 7, 2002 8:35 pm (EDT) at Turner Field in Atlanta, Georgia 70 °F (21 °C), cloudy
| Team | 1 | 2 | 3 | 4 | 5 | 6 | 7 | 8 | 9 | R | H | E |
|---|---|---|---|---|---|---|---|---|---|---|---|---|
| San Francisco | 0 | 1 | 0 | 1 | 0 | 0 | 1 | 0 | 0 | 3 | 6 | 2 |
| Atlanta | 0 | 0 | 0 | 0 | 0 | 1 | 0 | 0 | 0 | 1 | 7 | 0 |
WP: Russ Ortiz (2–0) LP: Kevin Millwood (1–1) Sv: Robb Nen (2); Home runs: SF: Barry Bonds (3); ATL: None; Attendance: 45,203; Boxscore

In the clinching Game 5, Russ Ortiz returned to the mound to face Kevin Millwood. The Giants struck first in the second inning; Barry Bonds hit a single to leadoff the inning, and Reggie Sanders would drive him home from second base on a two-out RBI single. In the fourth inning, on a 3-2 count, Bonds would line a ball into left-center to make it 2–0. The Braves had a golden opportunity in the fifth inning, having loaded the bases on an error and two walks, but Chipper Jones grounded out to the shortstop. The Braves would be rewarded for their patience in the next inning, which started with singles by Andruw Jones and Vinny Castilla to drive Ortiz out of the game. With one out, facing Aaron Fultz, Mark DeRosa lined a single to center to score Jones and cut the lead to one while Fultz was replaced by Felix Rodriguez. He would induce two subsequent outs to end the inning. The Giants returned the favor in the 7th, starting with a double by J.T. Snow and two walks by Mike Remlinger to load the bases. With one out, Kenny Lofton hit a flyball off Darren Holmes to center to score Snow. In the ninth, with the Braves trailing 3–1, Gary Sheffield and Chipper Jones each came to the plate with two men on to face against Robb Nen, representing the Division Series-winning run. However, Sheffield struck out and Jones would hit into a double play to end the series. For the first time since the 1989 National League Championship Series, the Giants had won a postseason series. As for the Braves, this continued a chain of postseason series losses that would not subside until eighteen years later.

=== Composite box ===
2002 NLDS (3–2): San Francisco Giants over Atlanta Braves

| Team | 1 | 2 | 3 | 4 | 5 | 6 | 7 | 8 | 9 | R | H | E |
|---|---|---|---|---|---|---|---|---|---|---|---|---|
| San Francisco Giants | 3 | 7 | 3 | 4 | 1 | 4 | 1 | 0 | 1 | 24 | 41 | 4 |
| Atlanta Braves | 1 | 5 | 1 | 3 | 1 | 8 | 0 | 3 | 4 | 26 | 44 | 0 |
Total attendance: 220,386 Average attendance: 44,077

== Arizona vs. St. Louis ==
The Arizona Diamondbacks won the West for the second straight year, having a better record than the previous year when they won the 2001 World Series. The St. Louis Cardinals were making their third straight postseason appearance.

=== Game 1 ===
October 1, 2002 8:00 pm (MST) at Bank One Ballpark in Phoenix, Arizona 80 °F (27 °C), roof open; clear
| Team | 1 | 2 | 3 | 4 | 5 | 6 | 7 | 8 | 9 | R | H | E |
|---|---|---|---|---|---|---|---|---|---|---|---|---|
| St. Louis | 2 | 0 | 0 | 3 | 0 | 1 | 6 | 0 | 0 | 12 | 14 | 1 |
| Arizona | 1 | 0 | 1 | 0 | 0 | 0 | 0 | 0 | 0 | 2 | 8 | 2 |
WP: Matt Morris (1–0) LP: Randy Johnson (0–1); Home runs: STL: Jim Edmonds (1), Scott Rolen (1); AZ: None; Attendance: 49,154; Boxscore

In Game 1, Matt Morris faced eventual 2002 Cy Young Award winner Randy Johnson, who dominated the 2001 postseason with ease. However, in the top of the first an error by Tony Womack put a runner on for Jim Edmonds, who then hit a home run to make it 2–0 Cardinals. The Diamondbacks scratched out a run in the bottom half on Steve Finley's sacrifice fly with runners on first and third. In the bottom of the third, Quinton McCracken tied the game with an RBI single. In the fourth, the floodgates began to open as Albert Pujols led off the inning with a triple and Scott Rolen followed with a two-run homer. Then Édgar Rentería's singled, stole second, moved to third on a ground out and scored on Mike Matheny's RBI single to make it is 5–2 Cards. Eli Marrero's sacrifice fly in the sixth made it 6–2 Cardinals before they blew the game open in the seventh. Matt Mantei allowed a single and walk, then Tino Martinez walked off Greg Swindell to load the bases. Swindell's errant throw on Matheny's bunt attempt allowed two runs to score, then Matt Morris's single scored two more runs. Mike Fetters relieved Swindell and walked Jim Edmonds with two outs to reload the bases before Albert Pujols's two-run single capped the scoring at 12–2 Cardinals, giving them a 1–0 series lead.

=== Game 2 ===
October 3, 2002 8:30 pm (MST) at Bank One Ballpark in Phoenix, Arizona 72 °F (22 °C), roof closed
| Team | 1 | 2 | 3 | 4 | 5 | 6 | 7 | 8 | 9 | R | H | E |
|---|---|---|---|---|---|---|---|---|---|---|---|---|
| St. Louis | 0 | 0 | 1 | 0 | 0 | 0 | 0 | 0 | 1 | 2 | 10 | 1 |
| Arizona | 0 | 0 | 0 | 0 | 0 | 0 | 0 | 1 | 0 | 1 | 6 | 0 |
WP: Jeff Fassero (1–0) LP: Mike Koplove (0–1) Sv: Jason Isringhausen (1); Home runs: STL: J. D. Drew (1); AZ: None; Attendance: 48,856; Boxscore

In Game 2, Chuck Finley faced Curt Schilling. J. D. Drew got the scoring started with a homer in the third to put the Cardinals up 1–0. Finley and Schilling dueled until Finley left with a cramp in his pitching hand. When Albert Pujols moved from left field in the eighth, he immediately created trouble by misplaying a ball hit by Greg Colbrunn off Rick White. Then Quinton McCracken tied the game with a double. The Cardinals regained the lead in the top of the ninth, however, when Édgar Rentería hit a leadoff single off Mike Koplove, moved to second on a sacrifice bunt, and scored on a Miguel Cairo RBI single. Jason Isringhausen shut the D'Backs down 1–2–3 in the bottom of the inning for the save, giving the Cardinals a 2–0 lead in the series. Jeff Fassero got the win in relief by retiring the last batter of the eighth.

=== Game 3 ===
October 5, 2002 7:00 pm (CDT) at Busch Stadium (II) in St. Louis, Missouri 73 °F (23 °C), clear
| Team | 1 | 2 | 3 | 4 | 5 | 6 | 7 | 8 | 9 | R | H | E |
|---|---|---|---|---|---|---|---|---|---|---|---|---|
| Arizona | 0 | 2 | 0 | 0 | 1 | 0 | 0 | 0 | 0 | 3 | 4 | 0 |
| St. Louis | 0 | 1 | 1 | 2 | 0 | 0 | 0 | 2 | X | 6 | 9 | 0 |
WP: Jeff Fassero (2–0) LP: Miguel Batista (0–1) Sv: Jason Isringhausen (2); Home runs: AZ: David Dellucci (1), Rod Barajas (1); STL: None; Attendance: 52,189; Boxscore

Trying to avoid a series sweep, the Diamondbacks struck first in the second off starter Andy Benes when David Dellucci homered after a walk to put them up 2–0. However, against Miguel Batista, Miguel Cairo's RBI single in the bottom half cut the lead to 2–1. Then Pujols would tie the game with an RBI single in the third. In the fourth with runners on first and third, Benes's sacrifice bunt allowed Cairo to score to give the Cardinals the lead. Fernando Viña's RBI single then made it 4–2 Cardinals. Rod Barajas homered to make it a one-run game in the fifth, but the Cardinals padded their lead in the eighth when Albert Pujols drew a leadoff walk off Byung-Hyun Kim and scored on Cairo's double. After an intentional walk, Kerry Robinson's RBI single made it 6–3 Cardinals. Jason Isringhausen got the series winning save by once again shutting down the Diamondbacks 1–2–3 in the ninth, and avenge last year's NLDS defeat.

=== Composite box ===
2002 NLDS (3–0): St. Louis Cardinals over Arizona Diamondbacks

| Team | 1 | 2 | 3 | 4 | 5 | 6 | 7 | 8 | 9 | R | H | E |
|---|---|---|---|---|---|---|---|---|---|---|---|---|
| St. Louis Cardinals | 2 | 1 | 2 | 5 | 0 | 1 | 6 | 2 | 1 | 20 | 33 | 2 |
| Arizona Diamondbacks | 1 | 2 | 1 | 0 | 1 | 0 | 0 | 1 | 0 | 6 | 18 | 2 |
Total attendance: 150,199 Average attendance: 50,066
