= Tim Salmon =

American baseball player (born 1968)

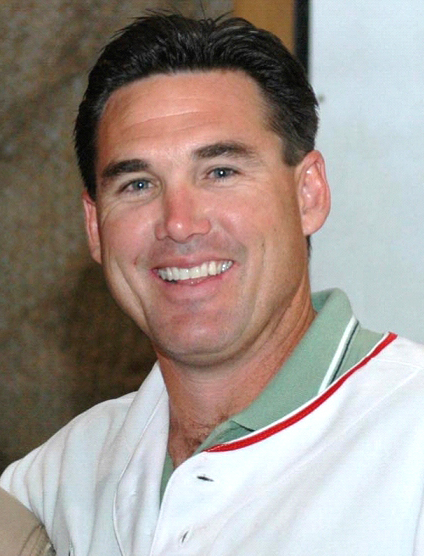
- Salmon at the Bagram Air Base in 2008
- Right fielder
- Born: August 24, 1968 (age 58); Long Beach, California, U.S.
- Batted: Right Threw: Right

MLB debut
- August 21, 1992, for the California Angels

Last MLB appearance
- October 1, 2006, for the Los Angeles Angels of Anaheim

MLB statistics
- Batting average: .282
- Home runs: 299
- Runs batted in: 1,016
- Stats at Baseball Reference

Teams
- California / Anaheim / Los Angeles Angels of Anaheim (1992–2004, 2006)

Career highlights and awards
- World Series champion (2002); AL Rookie of the Year (1993); Silver Slugger Award (1995); Angels Hall of Fame

Timothy James Salmon (born August 24, 1968), nicknamed "King Fish", is an American former professional baseball player and current sportcaster. He played his entire career in Major League Baseball (MLB) from 1992 to 2006 with the California / Anaheim / Los Angeles Angels as an outfielder and designated hitter. Salmon was an integral member of the Angels team that won the 2002 World Series. He is an analyst for Bally Sports West's Angels Live pre-and-postgame shows.

Salmon is considered one of the most prolific and beloved players in Angels history. At the time of his retirement, Salmon had the most home runs in Angels history with 299, since surpassed by Mike Trout in 2020. He was inducted into the Angels Hall of Fame in 2015.

== Early life ==
Salmon was born on August 24, 1968, in Long Beach, California, and was raised in the Belmont Shore neighborhood of the city. When he was three years old, Salmon provoked a two-hour search after he wandered out of the house and was found watching games at the baseball field in a local park. Salmon's parents divorced when he was young, causing him to initially move to Texas with his mother and brother before splitting time between there and his father's house in Arizona under joint custody. Salmon cites his older brother and grandmother as sources of stability in his childhood.

Salmon attended Greenway High School in Phoenix, Arizona. He was a three-sport varsity athlete, primarily playing baseball and football while also playing basketball. As a member of the school's football team, Salmon played various positions, mostly punter and wide receiver, and received scouting interest from various college football programs. As a senior in 1986, Salmon was a member of a state championship-winning Babe Ruth League team. At the age of 17, he was drafted in the 18th round by the Atlanta Braves in the 1986 amateur draft but he did not sign. In high school, Salmon was undecided about which sport to pursue, but he ultimately chose to join Grand Canyon University's baseball team. In 1988, he played collegiate summer baseball with the Cotuit Kettleers of the Cape Cod Baseball League.

== Professional career ==
=== Minor leagues ===
Salmon was selected by the California Angels in the third round of the 1989 MLB draft, the 69th overall pick. He was initially assigned to the Bend Bucks, an Angels affiliate in the Class A Short Season Northwest League. In his first minor league season, Salmon posted a .245 batting average with 6 home runs and 31 RBIs in 55 games. In 1990, he was promoted to the A-Advanced Palm Springs Angels. During a May 26 game against the San Bernardino Spirit, Salmon was hit in the face by Kerry Woodson's fastball, fracturing his jaw. He was hospitalized and had his jaw wired shut, sidelining him for a large portion of the season. One doctor likened Salmon's injury to "breaking glass in a sock," but Salmon stated he didn't feel any pain. Up until the injury, he was batting .288 with 2 home runs and 21 RBIs in 36 games. Salmon returned to the field in 1990 with the Double-A Midland Angels, posting a .268 batting average with 3 home runs and 16 RBIs in 27 games. He spent all of 1991 with Midland, batting .245 and hitting 23 home runs with 94 RBIs in 131 games. In the 1992 season, Salmon was promoted to play for the Triple-A Edmonton Trappers, batting .347 with 29 home runs and 105 RBIs, all of which were new career highs in his minor league tenure. He won the Baseball America Minor League Player of the Year Award that season.

=== Major leagues ===
==== 1992–1995: Early success, Rookie of the Year ====
On August 20, 1992, Salmon was called up to the big leagues by the Angels. Some baseball media members considered Salmon to be the most anticipated Angels call-up since Wally Joyner in 1986. He made his MLB debut on August 21, starting in right field and going 0-for-4 with a walk against the New York Yankees in Yankee Stadium. Salmon recorded his first hit the next day, a single off of Yankees starter Mélido Pérez in the 7th inning. He recorded his first career home run on August 23, a solo shot to left field off eventual teammate Scott Sanderson in the 4th inning. In his brief first season in the majors, Salmon batted .177 with 2 home runs and 6 RBIs in 23 games.

In 1993, Salmon joined the team as the everyday starter in right field for his true rookie season. By August, Salmon was batting .279 with 23 home runs and 71 RBIs, earning him media consideration as the frontrunner for the American League's Rookie of the Year award. Salmon finished the season batting .283 with 31 home runs and 95 RBIs. He won the American League Rookie of the Year award, only the fourth AL player ever to receive a unanimous vote.

Salmon started his 1994 season slow. Through May 3, he was batting .225 with 3 home runs, a point at which Angels hitting instructor Rod Carew had a meeting with Salmon, persuading him to be more aggressive at the plate. He took Carew's advice and results quickly followed: in a three-game stretch from May 10 to May 13, Salmon compiled a total of 13 hits, joining Joe Cronin and Walt Dropo in a three-way tie for the most hits in a three-game period in American League history. The set of games included a 5-for-5 performance with 2 home runs in a blowout victory over the Seattle Mariners in the Kingdome on May 13, raising his season batting average to .336 by the end of the day. Salmon received the AL Player of the Week Award for May 9–May 15, a first for his career. He finished the strike-shortened season batting .287 with 23 home runs and 70 RBIs in 100 games.

1995 was one of Salmon's career-best years at the plate. He set career highs in batting average at .330, on-base plus slugging (OPS) at 1.024, hits with 177, runs with 111, and total bases with 319. He received a Silver Slugger Award that year, and his 6.6 wins above replacement (WAR) ranked 7th among all players and 5th among position players in the American League. He placed 7th in AL Most Valuable Player Award voting.

==== 1996–1999: Move to cleanup spot ====
With the emergence of Angels left fielder Garret Anderson in the previous season and continued production from center fielder Jim Edmonds, Salmon was the eldest of a young outfield that some members of the media considered to be second-best in the AL, only behind the Cleveland Indians trio of Albert Belle, Kenny Lofton, and Manny Ramirez. Through April 1996, Salmon was batting .281 with 3 home runs and 11 RBIs. By the All-Star break, he was batting .293 with 22 home runs and 58 RBIs, but he did not receive an All-Star selection. Salmon finished the season batting .286 with a team-leading 30 home runs and 98 RBIs. He led AL right fielders in putouts with 302 and was second in right fielder assists with 13. He led the AL in most games played in the outfield with 153.

In 1997, Salmon was moved to the cleanup spot for the first time in his career after primarily batting third every year since his true rookie season. The move resulted in an increased amount of RBIs for Salmon, including 60 before the All-Star break. Salmon finished the year batting .296 with 33 home runs and set career-highs in plate appearances with 695, At bats with 582, and RBIs with 129. He drove in Darin Erstad 23 times and Dave Hollins 22 times. He led AL outfielders in double plays with 5 and right field assists with 15. His 129 RBIs ranked 7th in the major leagues. He finished seventh in AL MVP voting, receiving 84 points and a 21% share.

During spring training in 1998, Salmon suffered a strain to his Achilles tendon but was able to continue playing. On April 22, Salmon left the game in the third inning after straining the arch in his left foot. He was placed on the 15-day disabled list and would not return until May 9. Salmon was named the AL Player of the Week for August 9, a span in which he batted .480 with 12 hits, 4 home runs, and 9 RBIs. He finished the season batting .300 with 26 home runs and 88 RBI. His .410 on-base percentage (OBP) ranked fourth in the American League. Salmon maintained his status as the cleanup batter throughout the year, making 93 of his 130 starts there.

Salmon received the third AL Player of the Week award of his career on April 18, 1999, after batting .481 with 2 home runs and 12 RBIs. On May 3, Salmon was removed from a game with an injury to his left wrist; X-rays taken that evening were negative and he was diagnosed with a sprain. On May 11, Salmon was placed on the 15-day disabled list, retroactive to May 4. Salmon missed 62 games with the injury and did not return until July 17. He finished the 1999 season batting .266 with 17 home runs and 69 RBIs in 98 games.

==== 2000–2002: Veteran presence and World Series ====
With longtime pitcher Chuck Finley departing the team after 1999 and shortstop Gary DiSarcina playing his final MLB game on May 8, Salmon became the longest-tenured player on the field for the Angels early in the 2000 season. He received his fourth career AL Player of the Week award on August 6 after batting .583 with 2 home runs and 7 RBIs. On August 18, Salmon hit a fourth-inning home run off Roger Clemens, the 223rd home run of his career, surpassing Brian Downing for the most in Angels history. He earned the Player of the Week award again for August 27 after batting .500 with 2 home runs, one of which gave him his 30th on the year and made the Angels the first AL team that season to have four different players hit 30 home runs. His season stats improved from his injury-shortened 1999 season, batting .290 with 34 home runs and 97 RBIs while setting career highs in games played with 158 and walks with 104. His 108 runs scored ranked 10th in the AL and his 4 outfield double plays ranked second.

During the 2000–01 offseason, Salmon underwent surgery on both his right foot and his left shoulder, preventing him from conducting his regular weight training regimen. During spring training, he suffered a strain on his abdomen. Before the start of the season, Salmon, who was about to finish a four-year contract, briefly considered signing with the Arizona Diamondbacks, but instead signed a four-year, $40-million extension with the Angels. Through the first month of the 2001 season, Salmon batted .233 with 3 home runs, 10 RBIs, and 12 strikeouts. His struggles continued throughout the season and his batting average dipped to a season-low .195 on May 26. By the end of the season, he was batting .227, a career-low when excluding his abbreviated 1992 call-up season. He hit 17 home runs and 49 RBIs in 137 games. Team manager Mike Scioscia attributed Salmon's struggles to the two surgeries and spring training injury he endured.

In 2002, Salmon's regular season stats rebounded as he batted .286 with 22 home runs and 88 RBIs in 138 games. He helped lead the Angels to a 99-win season and a berth into the 2002 American League Division Series as the wild card team – it was the first postseason appearance of Salmon's career and the first for the Angels franchise since the 1986 American League Championship Series. During the ALDS, Salmon went 5-for-19 (.263) with 2 home runs and 7 RBIs in the team's 3–1 series victory over the New York Yankees. During the 2002 American League Championship Series, he went 3-for-14 (.214) with 3 walks as the Angels sealed their first ever American League pennant and a trip to the World Series with a 4–1 series victory over the Minnesota Twins. During Game 2 of the 2002 World Series, Salmon went 4-for-4 with 2 home runs, the first being a 2-run home run off Russ Ortiz in the second inning to make the score 7–4 Angels and the second also coming as a 2-run home run off of Félix Rodríguez to break the tie and give the Angels the 11–9 lead en route to their 11–10 victory. In Game 3, Salmon went 1-for-4 with an RBI, 2 walks, and 2 runs scored, and a stolen base. During Game 6, he went 2-for-4. Overall, Salmon went 9-for-26 (.346) with 2 home runs, 5 RBIs, 4 walks, and a 1.067 OPS as the Angels defeated the San Francisco Giants to win their first ever World Series. Salmon posted a 21.89% championship win probability added (cWPA) during the series, the highest out of anyone on the team and second-highest in the series behind Barry Bonds's 22.94%.

==== 2003–2006: Surgery and final seasons ====
In 2003, his age-34 season, Salmon faced a positional change for the first time in his career as he platooned with Jeff DaVanon in right field and made the rest of his appearances as a designated hitter. He played 78 games in right field and 68 as the designated hitter. He finished the season batting .275 with 19 home runs and 72 RBIs.

In 2004, Salmon's stint as a primary outfielder for the team effectively came to an end as he was the designated hitter in 39 appearances, pinch hitter in 14, and outfielder in 8. Through 60 games, Salmon was batting .253 with 2 home runs and 23 RBIs. On July 26, Salmon told the media that he was contemplating retiring after the 2005 season, the extent of his contract. On August 12, it was announced that Salmon would need surgery for his torn rotator cuff and biceps tendon. He signaled a desire to finish out the season and help the Angels in their playoff hunt before undergoing the procedure. By August 29, Salmon was experiencing too much pain in his arm to swing a bat but still said he hoped to return that season; he was placed on the 15-day disabled list in the meantime. On September 1, Salmon decided to undergo the surgery that would end his 2004 season and likely sideline him for all of 2005 due to its expected eight-to-10 month recovery window. Because Salmon's contract was due to expire following the 2005 season, there was speculation that the injury and subsequent surgery could be career-ending. As expected, Salmon missed all of the 2005 season while recovering.

In January 2006, a 37-year-old Salmon was extended a non-roster invite to spring training. Following spring training, Salmon made the major league roster and signed a one-year deal worth $400,000 to serve as a designated hitter. On May 13, Salmon hit the 1,000th RBI of his career, following Garret Anderson as the second player in Angels history to drive in 1,000 runs for the franchise. On September 28, Salmon announced he would officially retire at the end of the 2006 season. He played his final major league game on October 1, 2006, against the Oakland Athletics. His name and jersey number were cut into the infield and outfield grass of the playing field at Angel Stadium. Salmon finished his major league career with a .282 batting average, 1,674 hits, 299 home runs, 1,016 RBIs, 986 runs scored, 48 stolen bases, a .385 OBP, .498 SLG, 128 OPS+, 40.5 WAR, and 1,672 games played.

== Legacy ==
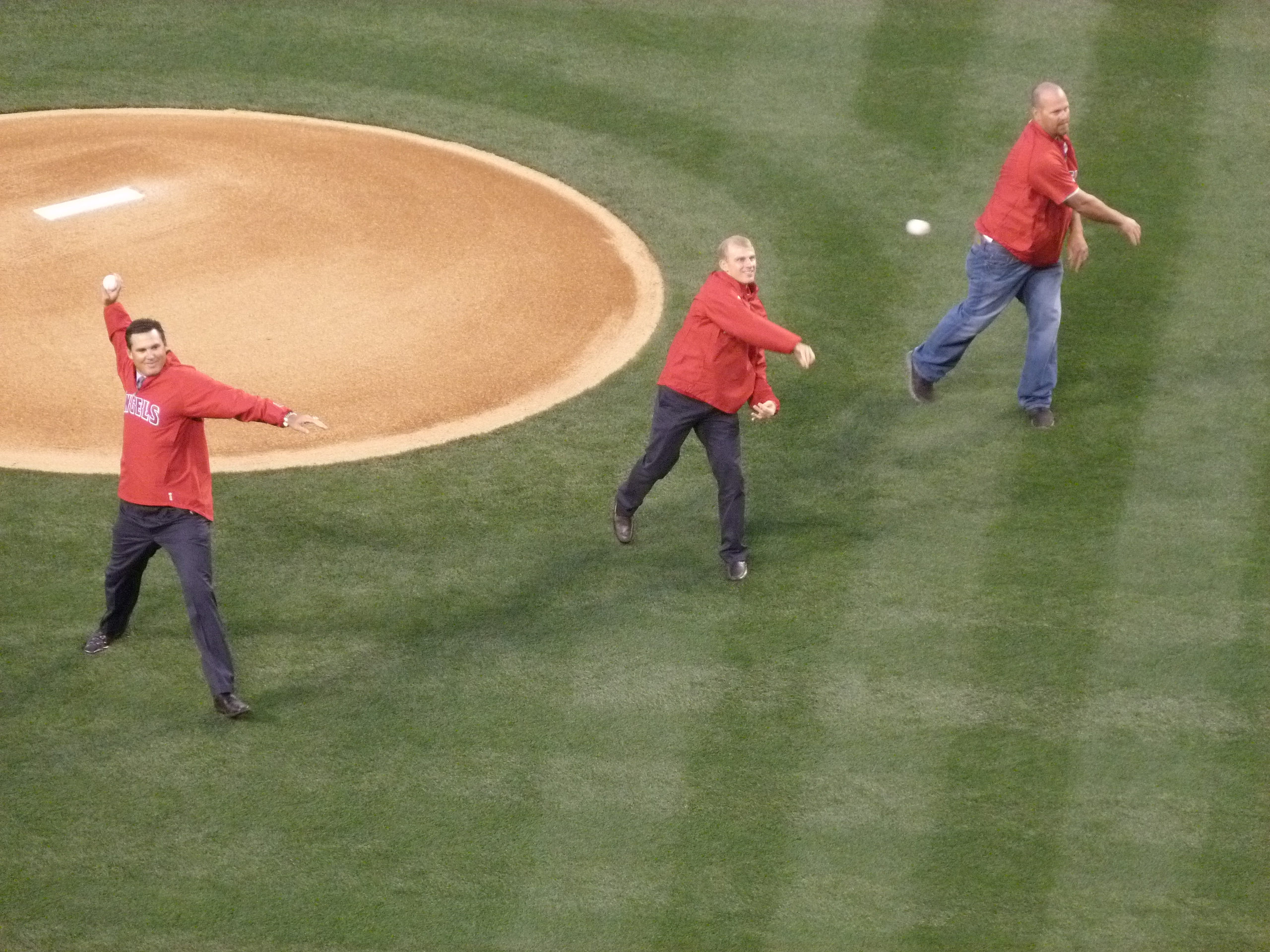
Salmon (left) throwing a ceremonial first pitch alongside David Eckstein (center) and Troy Percival (right) in 2012

As of 2026, Salmon is the Angels' all-time leader in walks (965). He is second in franchise history with 299 home runs, 1,016 RBIs and 986 runs scored. He is one of only three Angels players to have won the Rookie of the Year award, the others being Mike Trout in 2012 and Shohei Ohtani in 2018.

Salmon returned to Angel Stadium as a player in the 2010 All-Star Legends & Celebrity Softball Game where he received a standing ovation before hitting two home runs for the American League and receiving the game's MVP award.

Salmon's jersey number, 15, has not been officially retired by the Angels. The number was out of circulation from his retirement until the team issued it to Randal Grichuk in 2023. On August 22, 2015, Salmon was inducted into the Angels Hall of Fame alongside former pitchers Dean Chance and Mike Witt during a pregame ceremony at Angel Stadium. On August 29, 2016, he was inducted into the Pacific Coast League Hall of Fame with a ceremony at Smith's Ballpark in Salt Lake City, the home of the Angels' Triple-A affiliate Salt Lake Bees.

== Personal life ==
Salmon, his wife Marci, and their four children reside in Scottsdale, Arizona. While Salmon was with the Angels, the family lived in Newport Beach, California. His son played baseball while his daughter played softball.

Salmon is a Christian. During his time with the Angels, he would lead weekly chapel services in the team's clubhouse. Salmon has served as the head baseball coach at Scottsdale Christian Academy since 2015. He coached his son from 2015 to 2018.

== See also ==
- List of Major League Baseball career home run leaders
- List of Major League Baseball career runs batted in leaders
- List of Major League Baseball players who spent their entire career with one franchise

Awards and achievements
Preceded by Jeff King	American League Player of the Month; July 1997	Succeeded by Bernie Williams
