= Robb Nen =

American baseball player (born 1969)

- Pitcher
- Born: November 28, 1969 (age 56); San Pedro, California, U.S.
- Batted: Right Threw: Right

MLB debut
- April 10, 1993, for the Texas Rangers

Last MLB appearance
- September 28, 2002, for the San Francisco Giants

MLB statistics
- Win–loss record: 45–42
- Earned run average: 2.98
- Strikeouts: 793
- Saves: 314
- Stats at Baseball Reference

Teams
- Texas Rangers (1993); Florida Marlins (1993–1997); San Francisco Giants (1998–2002)

Career highlights and awards
- 3× All-Star (1998, 1999, 2002); World Series champion (1997); NL saves leader (2001); San Francisco Giants Wall of Fame

Robb Allen Nen (born November 28, 1969) is an American former Major League Baseball right-handed relief pitcher. He spent most of his career as a closer. He is the son of former major league first baseman Dick Nen.

Nen pitched for the Florida Marlins (1993–97); in 1997, Nen won the World Series championship with the Marlins. He also played with the San Francisco Giants (1998–2002), with whom he was a three-time All-Star and played in the 2002 World Series, and the Texas Rangers (1993).

Nen has 314 career saves with the Marlins (1993–1997; 108 saves) and Giants (1998–2002; 206 saves). He was 8th overall in career saves when he retired, and stands 25th overall as of September 13, 2023.

== Early life ==
Robb Allen Nen was born on November 28, 1969, in San Pedro, California. He attended Los Alamitos High School and played on the varsity baseball team with future Giants Gold Glove-winning first baseman J. T. Snow. Nen played mostly at third base, and also did some pitching. He skipped college and went directly to the minor leagues.

== Professional career ==
=== Texas Rangers (1993) ===
Nen was selected by the Rangers as a pitcher in the 32nd round of the 1987 MLB draft. The Rangers promoted him to their Major League roster in 1993. His partial season with the Rangers was marred by injuries and subpar results on the mound, resulting in a 6.35 earned run average.

=== Florida Marlins (1993–1997) ===
On July 17 of his first year, the Rangers traded Nen and pitcher Kurt Miller to the Florida Marlins for Cris Carpenter. Nen started one game for his new team and finished the 1993 season with a disappointing 7.02 ERA. The following season, the Marlins moved him to the bullpen in an effort to reduce the frequency of his arm injuries. Nen flourished in his new role and became the Marlins' new closer that year. He finished the strike-shortened 1994 season with 15 saves and a 2.95 ERA. Nen would continue to be a dominating closer for the Marlins, racking up a total of 108 saves and establishing himself as one of the elite closers of the 1990s. During the 1997 postseason, Nen pitched in eight games, including two saves in the World Series, as well as 1 2/3 innings of scoreless relief in the 9th and 10th innings of Game 7 while the Marlins came back in the last inning, and subsequently won the World Series in the bottom of the 11th. Throughout the 1997 playoffs, Florida didn't lose a single game in which Nen made an appearance.

In a controversial move, the Marlins held a "fire sale" in which they traded away most of their high-caliber players in favor of gaining prospects and utilizing many of their minor league players, all while keeping their team payroll low.

=== San Francisco Giants (1998–2002) ===
On November 18, 1997, Nen was traded to the Giants for Mike Villano, Joe Fontenot and Mick Pageler.

Nen was expected to fill in the closer role, a role recently vacated by Rod Beck, who left via free agency to the Chicago Cubs. If Beck had set the bar high for a San Francisco closer (199 saves in his seven-year tenure with the Giants), Nen would raise the bar. His first year yielded 40 saves with a 1.52 ERA and 110 strikeouts in 88 2/3 innings. As a Giant, Nen was selected to three All-Star Games (1998, 1999, 2002) and finished 4th in voting for the 2000 National League Cy Young Award and 12th in the NL MVP voting (the award went to teammate Jeff Kent), both high honors for a closer. The following year, Nen led the National League with 45 saves. The 9th inning was affectionately renamed the "Nenth" by fans.

The Giants, the National League wild card team, and the Anaheim Angels, the American League wild card team, played a seven-game series in which Nen earned two saves. Behind the pitching of starter Russ Ortiz, the Giants appeared to be cruising to an easy 5–0 victory in the critical Game 6 of 2002 World Series and their first World Series title since 1954 (when they were still the New York Giants). In the seventh inning, however, Ortiz ran into trouble and was relieved by Felix Rodríguez. Rodriguez then gave up a three-run home run to the Angels' Scott Spiezio.

The Angels tacked on another run in the eighth with a lead-off home run by Darin Erstad. After two more runners reached base safely in the eighth, Nen came in to relieve Tim Worrell and try to protect what was now a shaky one-run Giants lead. Nen was unable to shut down the Angels' surge, and gave up a two-run double to eventual series MVP Troy Glaus, which put the Angels ahead by one run. They hung on to win the game, and won the series following a win the next day. Nen pitched with full awareness that he was likely jeopardizing his career and remains admired by Giants' fans for his self-sacrifice. It was, in fact, his final appearance. The eight save opportunities (with seven saved) in one postseason is a record, tied in 2015 by Jeurys Familia & 2023 by Paul Sewald; the seven saves ties the mark with five other pitchers (John Wetteland, Troy Percival, Brad Lidge, Koji Uehara and Greg Holland).

During the next two seasons, Nen spent time rehabilitating from three surgeries for a torn rotator cuff that he had aggravated during the middle of the 2002 season. The tear went through 40 to 75% of his right shoulder. When his contract with the Giants ended after the 2004 season, Nen filed for free agency but was not picked up by any team.

On February 20, 2005, Nen formally announced his retirement. He is the all-time saves leader for the Giants with 206 saves. His locker was maintained throughout the 2003 and 2004 seasons as he last left it and was formally retired in 2005, but his jersey continued to hang in the locker room both at home and on the road. He would have a day dedicated to him in San Francisco at their home park (known at the time as SBC Park) on July 9 of that year; he noted at the time of his retirement that he had no regrets for how his career ended.

== Pitching style ==
Nen was known for an unusual delivery in which he tapped his toe on the ground before releasing the ball. His signature pitch, a slider, was nicknamed "The Terminator" with a velocity of up to 92 mph. In addition to the slider, Nen had a fastball that reached the upper 90s. A splitter rounded out Nen's pitching arsenal.

== Post-playing career ==
Nen joined the Giants' baseball operations department as an instructor on both the major and minor league levels, while also advising general manager Brian Sabean on an as-needed basis.

== Honors ==
Plaque commemorating Nen's 300th career save.

In a ceremony before their July 9, 2005, game against the St. Louis Cardinals, the Giants honored Nen with a plaque commemorating his 300th career save. The plaque is now located on the public walkway behind the right-field wall of Oracle Park, not far from McCovey Cove.

== See also ==
- List of Major League Baseball annual saves leaders
