= Kirk Rueter =

American baseball player (born 1970)

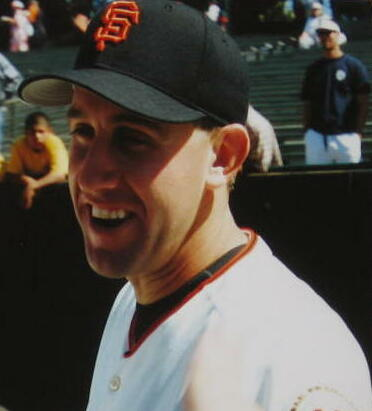
- Pitcher
- Born: December 1, 1970 (age 55); Hoyleton, Illinois, U.S.
- Batted: Left Threw: Left

MLB debut
- July 7, 1993, for the Montreal Expos

Last MLB appearance
- July 29, 2005, for the San Francisco Giants

MLB statistics
- Win–loss record: 130–92
- Earned run average: 4.27
- Strikeouts: 818
- Stats at Baseball Reference

Teams
- Montreal Expos (1993–1996); San Francisco Giants (1996–2005)

Career highlights and awards
- San Francisco Giants Wall of Fame

Kirk Wesley Rueter (/ˈriːtər/ REE-ter; born December 1, 1970), nicknamed "Woody", is an American former professional baseball pitcher who played 13 seasons in Major League Baseball (MLB), primarily for the San Francisco Giants. He also played for the Montreal Expos who had drafted him in 1991.

== Early life and education ==
Rueter was born in Centralia, Illinois, grew up in Hoyleton, Illinois, and graduated from Nashville Community High School in Nashville, Illinois, in 1988. He attended and played for Murray State University.

== Baseball career ==
=== Montreal Expos ===
Reuter was drafted 477th overall by the Montreal Expos in 1991, and he broke into the majors in 1993 at 22 years old, posting an 8-0 record in 14 starts. He pitched for the Expos through the 1996 season and compiled an overall 25-12 record. He would also go on to be the last player in the Nationals organization to wear the number 42 before its league-wide retirement the following season.

=== San Francisco Giants ===
On July 30, 1996, he was traded to the San Francisco Giants along with Tim Scott for Mark Leiter. Rueter blossomed into one of the Giants' most dependable starters. The following year, Rueter pitched in his first full season. To great success, he went 13-6 with a 3.45 ERA in 32 starts with a career high 115 K's. In 1998, despite achieving a career high 16 victories, Rueter's ERA rose from the previous season, finishing with a 4.36 in 187+ innings.

In 1999, backed with a lot of run support, Rueter reached 15 wins despite posting an ERA of 5.41, while also serving 28 home runs.

In 2000, Rueter was the first pitcher to start a major league game at Pacific Bell Park in San Francisco. By the end of the season, Rueter bounced back to post an ERA of 3.96, while also collecting 11 wins. For many fans, Rueter's defining moment as a Giant was his gutsy bullpen performance in Game 2 of the 2000 NLDS, where he relieved starter Shawn Estes after Estes sprained his ankle on a baserunning play.

2002, a year which saw a Giants' World Series appearance, was statistically Rueter's best year. He went 14-8 with a 3.23 ERA. Rueter was the pitcher in Game 4 of the 2002 World Series; he went six innings, allowing three earned runs. Rueter also pitched shutout ball in relief of Liván Hernández in Game 7 of the 2002 Series, but the Giants failed to score enough runs to come back.

In 2003, despite posting a record of 10-5 in 27 starts, Rueter had an ERA of 4.53 and went through control problems throughout the season, recording 47 walks while striking out just 41.

He began to struggle in 2004 with a 9-12 record and a 4.73 ERA, while continuing with his control issues from the previous season. Despite starting 33 games for the Giants, Rueter issued 66 walks while striking out 56.

In 2005, after posting a 2-7 record and 5.95 ERA, the Giants designated him for assignment. His nine-year tenure in San Francisco ended with some controversy, as Rueter complained about having to pitch out of the bullpen and only pitching three times in his last 41 days as a Giant. Rueter's trademarks were his fast-paced pitching style and his large ears.

On March 6, 2006, Rueter announced his retirement from the game after 13 seasons. He retired as the Giants franchise record holder for career wins by a left-handed pitcher in the San Francisco Era (since broken by Madison Bumgarner), with 105 of his 130 career wins in a Giants uniform. Rueter has the 20th most wins all-time in Giants franchise history. He is the third all-time in wins during the San Francisco Era. He made the third most career starts in San Francisco Giants history. Only Juan Marichal and Gaylord Perry had more career starts and wins. The Giants honored Rueter's career during pregame ceremonies on "Kirk Rueter Day" at SBC Park on August 19, 2006, by giving Rueter a lifesize bobblehead of his likeness and giving him and his family a trip to Hawaii.

== Scouting report ==
Rueter was primarily a control and changeup pitcher. His fastball rarely hit 90 mph. He threw changeups, fastballs, sinkers, curveballs, cut fastballs, and sliders. He also was an exceptional fielder, ranking highly in defensive metrics throughout his career. He posted a career .988 fielding percentage with only seven errors in 581 total chances covering 1918 innings.

Some credited the effects of the QuesTec umpiring system to his decline, because Rueter's success came mostly from being able to "paint the corners" of the strike zone and the system effectively took that ability away from him because it encouraged umpires to call a tighter strike zone. Rueter was never a strikeout pitcher; he struck out more than a hundred batters in a season only twice in his career. Former teammate Rich Aurilia said, "He was very, very capable of winning with his stuff because he had confidence in what he could do. He always pitched to what his strengths were."

== Personal life ==
Rueter and his wife Karla have two daughters, and they live in Nashville, Illinois. His property includes a large, separate building known as "The Shed", which contains a theater and game room, and houses many pieces of sports memorabilia collected by Rueter during his career.

Although Rueter never attended the University of North Carolina, he is a fan of Tar Heels basketball. He also serves as an MLB coach at the Gary Gaetti Sports Academy, in Centralia, Illinois. He previously was the pitching coach at McKendree University.
