= Ryan Jensen (baseball, born 1975) =

American baseball player (born 1975)

- Pitcher
- Born: September 17, 1975 (age 50); Salt Lake City, Utah, U.S.
- Batted: Right Threw: Right

MLB debut
- May 19, 2001, for the San Francisco Giants

Last MLB appearance
- July 9, 2005, for the Kansas City Royals

MLB statistics
- Win–loss record: 17–12
- Earned run average: 5.06
- Strikeouts: 152
- Stats at Baseball Reference

Teams
- San Francisco Giants (2001–2003); Kansas City Royals (2005)

Larry Ryan Jensen (born September 17, 1975) is an American former professional baseball pitcher. He played in Major League Baseball (MLB) for the San Francisco Giants and Kansas City Royals. He won 13 games in 2002 for the Giants.

== Career ==
Jensen was born in Salt Lake City, Utah. He attended Cottonwood High School, Snow College, and Southern Utah University, and then signed his first professional baseball contract with the Giants in June 1996.

Jensen pitched for various minor league teams over the next five years, including the Pacific Coast League's Fresno Grizzlies from 1998–2001. In 2001, he went 11–2 with a 3.48 earned run average. Jensen made the San Francisco starting rotation in 2002 and went 13–8 in 171.2 innings. It was his only full major league season.

In 2003, Jensen started off slow and was sent back down to Fresno, where he went 1-10. In November 2004, he signed with the Kansas City Royals. He made 18 starts for the Omaha Royals in 2005; he went 2–11 with a 7.20 ERA before being released.

Jensen also signed with the Baltimore Orioles and Texas Rangers. His baseball career ended in 2006.
