= Trey Lunsford =

American baseball player

- Catcher
- Born: May 25, 1979 (age 46); Odessa, Texas, U.S.
- Batted: Right Threw: Right

MLB debut
- September 12, 2002, for the San Francisco Giants

Last MLB appearance
- June 18, 2003, for the San Francisco Giants

MLB statistics
- Batting average: .500
- Home runs: 0
- Runs batted in: 1
- Stats at Baseball Reference

Teams
- San Francisco Giants (2002–2003)

James Lewis "Trey" Lunsford (born May 25, 1979) is a former baseball catcher who last played in the San Francisco Giants farm system with the Double-A Norwich Navigators. Lunsford attended Central High School in San Angelo, Texas. After graduating, he went to Grayson County College before transferring to Texas Tech University for his junior season.

== Draft ==
Lunsford was originally drafted by the Chicago Cubs in the 37th round of the 1998 draft (1096th overall). He declined to sign and attended Texas Tech instead. In 2000, Lunsford was drafted by the San Francisco Giants in the 33rd round of the draft (991st overall). He signed with the Giants on June 14, 2000.

== Career ==
=== Single-A ===
After being drafted by the Giants, Lunsford was sent to the Salem-Keizer Volcanoes of the Short Season Single-A Northwest League. He played for the Volcanoes for the entire 2000 season. He was honored as a Northwest League All-Star during the season.

Lunsford was promoted to the Hagerstown Suns of the Single-A South Atlantic League for the 2001 season. He hit .237 in 114 games with the Suns. Defensively, Lunsford had a .986 fielding percentage as a catcher and threw out 31% of attempted basestealers.

=== 2002 and promotion ===
After recovering from a fractured hand, Lunsford progressed quickly through the Giants' system in 2002, playing at Advanced-A, Double-A, and Triple-A levels. On September 12, 2002, Lunsford made his Major League debut at the age of 23. In his first Major League at-bat, Lunsford singled in the 10th inning off San Diego Padres pitcher Trevor Hoffman.

In three games in 2002, Lunsford collected two hits in three at-bats, with one double, one RBI and one strikeout. After the 2002 season, Lunsford played for the Grand Canyon Rafters of the Arizona Fall League.

In 2003, Lunsford appeared in one game as a pinch hitter/defensive replacement. He went 0 for 1 and caught the last two innings of the game. A sprained right thumb ended his 2003 season early, however.

Overall, Lunsford hit .500 in four major league at-bats. As a fielder, he committed one error in five chances for an .800 fielding percentage.

=== 2004–present ===
After recovering from his thumb injury, Lunsford played in the Giants minor league system in the 2004 and 2005 seasons. In 2004, Lunsford was a member of the Fresno Grizzlies of the Triple-A Pacific Coast League. In 2005, he played for the Norwich Navigators of the Double-A Eastern League. In March 2006, Lunsford had Tommy John surgery on his right elbow. He has not played professional baseball since the surgery.

== Personal life ==
Lunsford now resides in Southaven, Mississippi with his wife Holly, and three kids.
