= Tim Worrell =

American baseball player (born 1967)

- Worrell with the San Francisco Giants
- Pitcher
- Born: July 5, 1967 (age 58); Pasadena, California, U.S.
- Batted: Right Threw: Right

MLB debut
- June 25, 1993, for the San Diego Padres

Last MLB appearance
- June 27, 2006, for the San Francisco Giants

MLB statistics
- Win–loss record: 48–59
- Earned run average: 3.97
- Strikeouts: 758
- Stats at Baseball Reference

Teams
- San Diego Padres (1993–1997); Cleveland Indians (1998); Detroit Tigers (1998); Oakland Athletics (1998–1999); Baltimore Orioles (2000); Chicago Cubs (2000); San Francisco Giants (2001–2003); Philadelphia Phillies (2004–2005); Arizona Diamondbacks (2005); San Francisco Giants (2006)

Timothy Howard Worrell (born July 5, 1967) is an American former professional baseball pitcher. A right-hander, he pitched all or parts of 14 seasons in Major League Baseball, primarily as a relief pitcher. During his major league career, Worrell pitched for nine teams, including the San Diego Padres, Cleveland Indians, Detroit Tigers, Oakland Athletics, Baltimore Orioles, Chicago Cubs, San Francisco Giants (twice), Philadelphia Phillies, and Arizona Diamondbacks.

== Playing career ==
Worrell's greatest success came in 2003 when he replaced the injured Robb Nen as the closer for San Francisco. After the season Worrell signed with the Philadelphia Phillies, where he returned to his previous role as a set-up pitcher, often pitching the eighth inning before Phillies closer Billy Wagner entered the game.

On May 6, 2005, Worrell stated that he was dealing with "personal psychological issues" that had to be resolved and was subsequently placed on the 15-day disabled list. Prior to this disclosure Worrell had struggled, posting a 9.82 ERA, by far the worst of his career. Seemingly back to his old self, Worrell returned to pitch a perfect ninth on July 4, 2005, and completed the season in Arizona with an exceptional 0.90 ERA over his last 18 games.

On December 1, 2005, Worrell's return to the San Francisco Giants was confirmed, with a two-year contract valued at $4 million.

On January 10, 2007, he announced his retirement due to a persistent nerve problem in his neck. Worrell stated that his major league career is not completely over as he wanted to get into coaching. He is currently the rehab pitching coach for the Peoria Padres.

== Personal life ==
Worrell is the younger brother of former Major League pitcher Todd Worrell, himself a former closer for the St. Louis Cardinals and Los Angeles Dodgers. On June 13, 1997, they both earned a save, becoming the second pair of brothers to do so on one day.
