= Jason Schmidt =

American baseball player (born 1973)

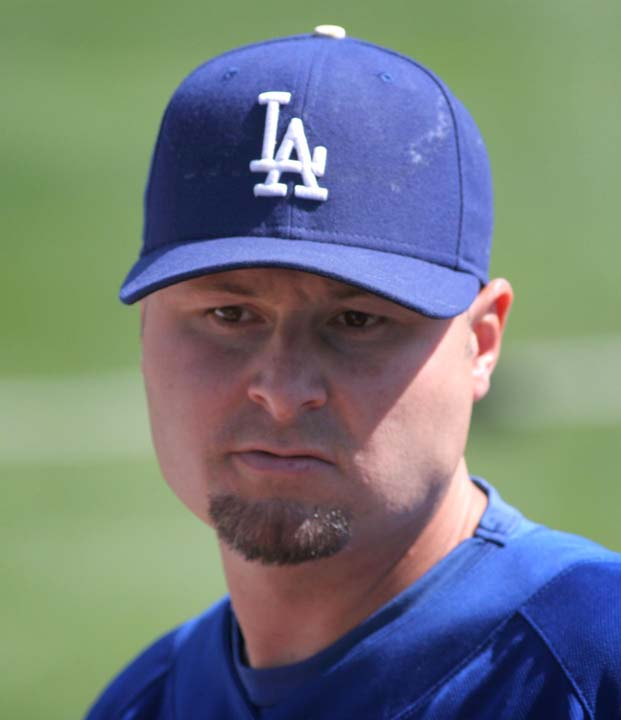
- Schmidt with the Los Angeles Dodgers
- Pitcher
- Born: January 29, 1973 (age 53); Lewiston, Idaho, U.S.
- Batted: Right Threw: Right

MLB debut
- April 28, 1995, for the Atlanta Braves

Last MLB appearance
- August 5, 2009, for the Los Angeles Dodgers

MLB statistics
- Win–loss record: 130–96
- Earned run average: 3.96
- Strikeouts: 1,758
- Stats at Baseball Reference

Teams
- Atlanta Braves (1995–1996); Pittsburgh Pirates (1996–2001); San Francisco Giants (2001–2006); Los Angeles Dodgers (2007, 2009)

Career highlights and awards
- 3× All-Star (2003, 2004, 2006); NL ERA leader (2003); San Francisco Giants Wall of Fame

Jason David Schmidt (born January 29, 1973) is an American former Major League Baseball pitcher. In his career, he has played for the Los Angeles Dodgers (2007–2009), San Francisco Giants (2001–06), Pittsburgh Pirates (1996–2001) and Atlanta Braves (1995–96), by whom he had been drafted in the eighth round, 206th overall, of the 1991 draft.

== Early life ==
Jason David Schmidt was born on January 29, 1973, in Lewiston, Idaho. Schmidt attended Kelso High School in Kelso, Washington, where he played football and basketball in addition to baseball. In 1991 as a senior he tossed a no-hitter, striking out 20 of 21 batters he faced. He was named Washington's Gatorade State Player of the Year and All-State MVP in baseball. He was offered a scholarship to the University of Arizona.

== Professional career ==
=== Draft and minor leagues ===
Schmidt chose to sign with the Atlanta Braves after they drafted him in the eighth round of the 1991 MLB draft. Schmidt made his professional debut with the Gulf Coast Braves in 1991, starting eleven games and finishing with a 3–4 record and 2.38 ERA. He worked his way through the Braves farm system from 1992 to 1995, playing with the Pulaski Braves (1992-rookie league), Macon Braves (1992-Class A), Durham Bulls (1993-Class A), Greenville Braves (1994-Class AA) and Richmond Braves (1995-Class AAA).

=== Atlanta Braves (1995–1996) ===
He made his major league debut in relief on April 28, 1995, against the Los Angeles Dodgers. Schmidt recorded his first ML victory in his first start, pitching eight scoreless innings against the Chicago Cubs on September 3, 1995.

In 1996 he started the season in the Braves rotation but also spent time in Richmond and on the disabled list before he was traded to the Pittsburgh Pirates (with Ron Wright) for Denny Neagle on August 30, 1996.

=== Pittsburgh Pirates (1996–2001) ===
As a member of the Pirates, Schmidt won 10, 11, and 13 games in 1997, 1998, and 1999, respectively. However, he was on a losing team each season in Pittsburgh. He was the last player on the team to wear number 42, as all of Major League Baseball retired it for Jackie Robinson in 1997, except those who chose to keep the number (e.g. Mariano Rivera). Schmidt then switched to number 22 for the remainder of his stay with the team, and wore number 29 after leaving the Pirates.

=== San Francisco Giants (2001–2006) ===
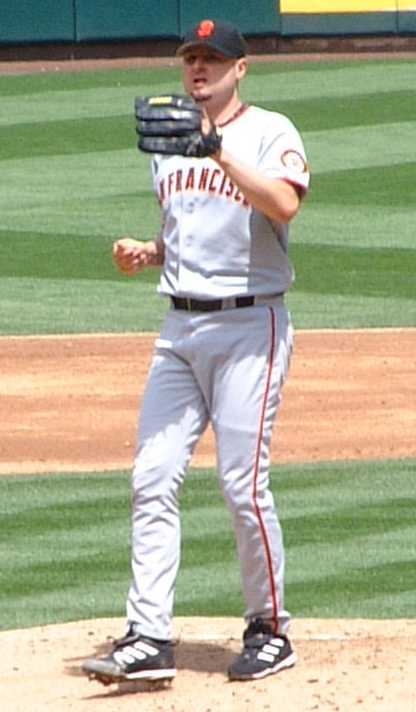
Schmidt pitching for the San Francisco Giants in 2006

Schmidt was then acquired by the Giants in 2001 with John Vander Wal in exchange for Armando Ríos and Ryan Vogelsong. Schmidt saw more success in San Francisco. Between his stints in Pittsburgh and San Francisco during the 2001 season, Schmidt compiled thirteen wins. Schmidt re-signed as a free agent with San Francisco that winter, in what would become a five-year $41 million deal. He went on to win thirteen again in 2002 when the Giants made a World Series appearance, but lost to the Anaheim Angels. Schmidt started Games 1 and 5 of the 2002 World Series, picking up the win in Game 1 and a no-decision in Game 5. In 2003, he won 17 games. Schmidt threw a 2–0 shutout in Game 1 of the 2003 NLDS, beating Josh Beckett, but his team lost once again in the playoffs, this time to the Florida Marlins. Schmidt was an All-Star this year as well as the league leader with a 2.34 earned run average. He placed second to Éric Gagné in the 2003 National League Cy Young Award voting.

On May 18, 2004, Schmidt pitched a one-hitter against the Chicago Cubs and Matt Clement. The Giants won the game, 1–0. This performance was overshadowed by Randy Johnson's perfect game against the Atlanta Braves the same day. Schmidt also pitched a one-hitter against the Boston Red Sox one month later on June 20, 2004. Schmidt would go on to win 18 games in 2004 and be voted the TSN Pitcher of the Year in the National League, and fourth in Cy Young voting. He also set a San Francisco single-season record of 251 strikeouts, which was broken when Tim Lincecum struck out 265 in 2008.

Plaque commemorating Schmidt's 16-strikeout game located on the public walkway behind right field at Oracle Park in San Francisco

On June 6, 2006 at AT&T Park, in a 2–1 win over the Florida Marlins, Schmidt pitched a complete game and struck out a career-high 16 batters. The game included a ninth-inning wild pitch that moved base runners to second and third with no outs. Schmidt struck out the final three batters of the game, starting with cleanup hitter Miguel Cabrera, Josh Willingham and Jeremy Hermida. Not only did he tie the franchise all-time single-game strikeouts record originally set by Christy Mathewson of the New York Giants on October 3, 1904, against the St. Louis Cardinals, but he also surpassed Gaylord Perry's San Francisco Giants single-game strikeouts record, when Perry struck out 15 batters on July 22, 1966, against the Philadelphia Phillies. In addition, he set AT&T Park's individual single-game strikeout record in the short history of the ballpark.

=== Los Angeles Dodgers (2007–2009) ===
Schmidt signed a three-year, $47 million deal with the Los Angeles Dodgers prior to the 2007 season. After only three starts he missed forty-five days with a right shoulder injury before being reactivated from the disabled list (DL) on June 5. He started three games after his return from the DL, the last two created more concern. On June 18 he was returned to the DL and underwent exploratory surgery to find the cause of his ineffectiveness. The damage to his shoulder was more severe than expected and he missed the rest of the 2007 season due to injury. The Dodgers hoped to have Schmidt back before the end of the 2008 season, but manager Joe Torre later said that Schmidt would not be back, making only a few rehab starts in the minors during the year.

Heading into 2009, Schmidt was expected to compete for a spot in the Dodgers' rotation but pitched poorly in spring training and began the season once more on the disabled list. After several rehab starts in the minors, Schmidt was activated on July 20, 2009, to start against the Cincinnati Reds, his first appearance in a Major League game since 2007. He went five innings, allowed three runs and picked up the win. He made another start on July 26 against the Florida Marlins, but pitched poorly and allowed five runs (four earned) in three innings and was credited with the loss. He started against the Atlanta Braves on July 31 and pitched six shutout innings, getting the win as the Dodgers won 5–0. On August 7, he was again placed on the DL, with Torre speculating that Schmidt's career might be over.

== Accomplishments ==
- 3× MLB All-Star (2003–2004, 2006)

== Records ==
San Francisco Giants Records

- 16 strikeouts in a single-game on June 6, 2006, against the Florida Marlins at AT&T Park (tied with Christy Mathewson)

== Personal life ==
Schmidt and his wife Bethany have three children: Makynlee (born January 14, 2001), Mason (born January 29, 2004), and Madden (born April 22, 2007). Schmidt's mother Vicki died from brain cancer on April 22, 2003, at age 53.

== See also ==
- List of Major League Baseball annual ERA leaders

Preceded by Curt Schilling	National League All-Star Game Starting Pitcher; 2003	Succeeded by Roger Clemens
