= Manny Aybar =

Dominican baseball player (born 1972)

Conspiradores de Querétaro
- Pitcher / Coach
- Born: May 4, 1972 (age 53); Baní, Dominican Republic
- Batted: Right Threw: Right

MLB debut
- August 4, 1997, for the St. Louis Cardinals

Last MLB appearance
- June 10, 2005, for the New York Mets

MLB statistics
- Win–loss record: 17–18
- Earned run average: 5.11
- Strikeouts: 273
- Stats at Baseball Reference

Teams
- St. Louis Cardinals (1997–1999); Colorado Rockies (2000); Cincinnati Reds (2000); Florida Marlins (2000); Chicago Cubs (2001); San Francisco Giants (2002–2003); Uni-President Lions (2004); New York Mets (2005); LG Twins (2006)

Manuel Antonio Aybar (born May 4, 1972) is a Dominican former pitcher and coach who has played in Major League Baseball and Korea Baseball Organization. He batted and threw right-handed. Aybar is currently a coach for the Conspiradores de Querétaro of the Mexican League.

Aybar began his professional career in 1992 as a shortstop in the St. Louis Cardinals organization, but switched to pitching in 1993. He made his major league debut on August 4, 1997, with St. Louis in a 4–2 loss to the New York Mets. After that, he was unable to fully establish himself as a major leaguer, spending time in the Colorado Rockies, Cincinnati Reds, Chicago Cubs, Florida Marlins, Tampa Bay Devil Rays, San Francisco Giants, New York Mets and LG Twins organizations at both the major league and Triple-A levels and in Korean baseball. Aybar played for the Dorados de Chihuahua of the Mexican League for the 2010 season.

In 2015, he served as pitching coach for the DSL Mets 1.
