= Rich Aurilia =

American baseball player (born 1971)

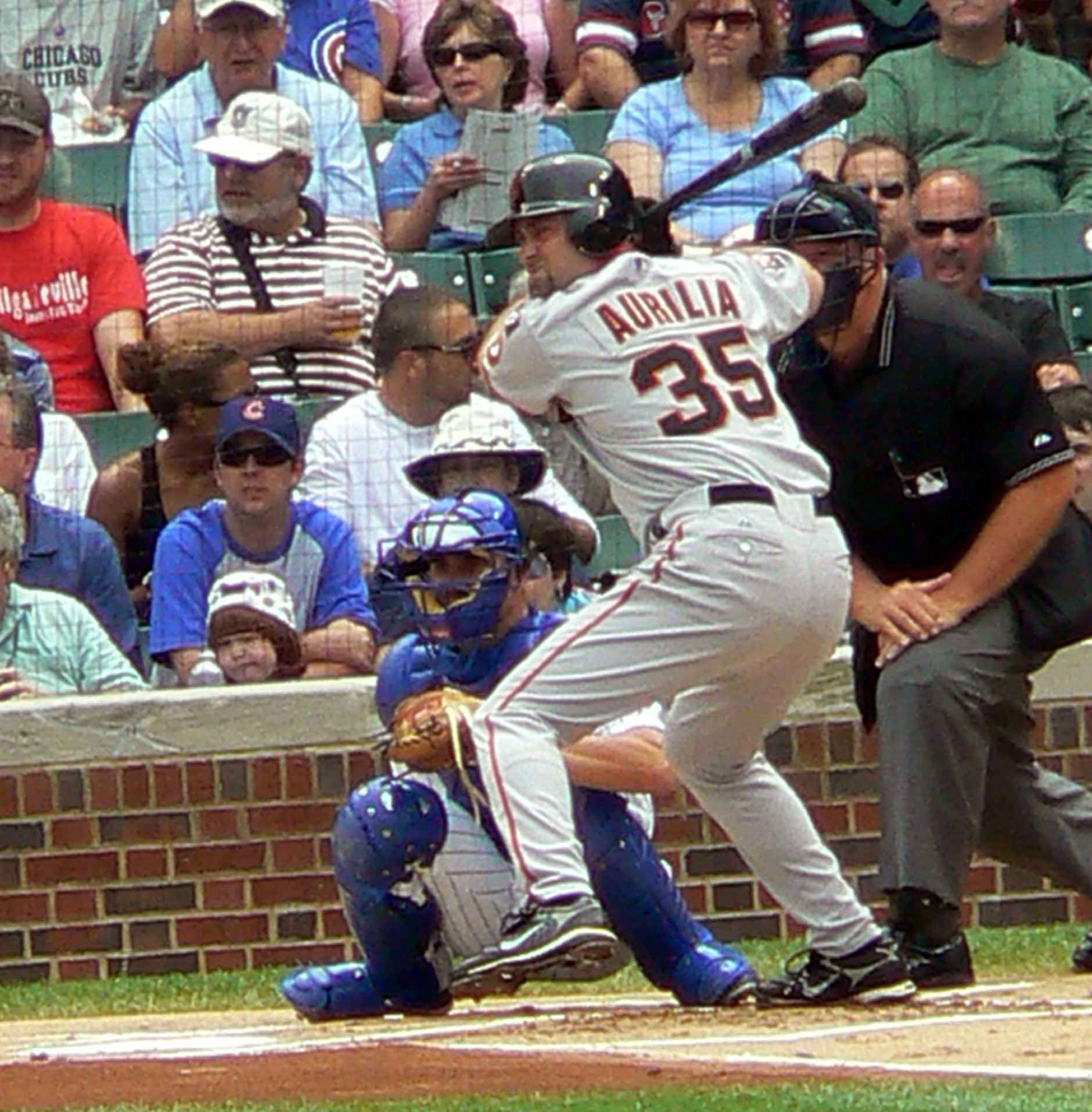
- Aurilia with the Giants in 2007
- Shortstop
- Born: September 2, 1971 (age 55); Brooklyn, New York, U.S.
- Batted: Right Threw: Right

MLB debut
- September 6, 1995, for the San Francisco Giants

Last MLB appearance
- October 4, 2009, for the San Francisco Giants

MLB statistics
- Batting average: .275
- Home runs: 186
- Runs batted in: 756
- Stats at Baseball Reference

Teams
- San Francisco Giants (1995–2003); Seattle Mariners (2004); San Diego Padres (2004); Cincinnati Reds (2005–2006); San Francisco Giants (2007–2009)

Career highlights and awards
- All-Star (2001); Silver Slugger Award (2001); San Francisco Giants Wall of Fame

Richard Santo Aurilia (/əˈriːliə/; born September 2, 1971) is an American former professional baseball shortstop. He played in Major League Baseball (MLB) between 1995 and 2009 for the San Francisco Giants, Seattle Mariners, San Diego Padres, and Cincinnati Reds.

== Early life ==
Richard Santo Aurilia was born on September 2, 1971, in Brooklyn, New York, and he grew up a New York Mets fan. Aurilia attended Xaverian High School in Brooklyn, New York, where he excelled in baseball. He was inducted into the school's Hall of Fame, and his number 22 was retired by his local baseball league, Our Lady of Grace, where he played as a youngster in Gravesend, Brooklyn, New York.

== College career ==
Before being drafted by Texas, Aurilia was a standout at St. John's University, where he represented the Red Storm as an All-Big East selection in 1992. In 1991, he played collegiate summer baseball in the Cape Cod Baseball League for the Hyannis Mets.

== Professional career ==
=== Draft and minor leagues ===
The 24th-round pick of the Texas Rangers in the 1992 Major League Baseball draft, Aurilia played in the Rangers minor league system before being traded along with Desi Wilson to the San Francisco Giants for John Burkett on December 22, 1994. He had worked as a stagehand at the Metropolitan Opera House during the 1993–94 baseball offseason.

=== San Francisco Giants (1995–2003) ===
Aurilia made his Major League debut on September 6, 1995, as a defensive replacement in a game against the Montreal Expos. This would begin his long, solid run as the Giants shortstop. On June 14, 1997, during his first stint with the Giants, Aurilia hit the first-ever grand slam in interleague play at the expense of the Anaheim Angels' Allen Watson, a former teammate. The Giants went on to win the game 10–3. 2001 would prove to be a banner year for Aurilia as he collected a National League best 206 hits, all leading to a .324 batting average with 37 home runs, 97 RBI, an NL All-Star nod, and a Silver Slugger Award. However, his career best 37 home run year in 2001 was overshadowed by teammate Barry Bonds' record breaking 73 home runs in the same season.

From 1999 to 2001, he led NL shortstops in home runs. Production trailed off in 2002, but Aurilia shined once again in San Francisco's failed 2002 run for a World Series Championship. In 14 postseason games that season, he batted .296, with 5 home runs and 14 RBI (an NL record for a shortstop in the postseason). He also was a Roberto Clemente Award nominee.

=== Seattle Mariners (2004) ===
After offensive stagnation in 2003, the Giants severed their nine-year relation with the shortstop, granting him free agency on October 27. Soon after, Aurilia signed on with the Seattle Mariners to patrol the M's infield.

=== San Diego Padres (2004) ===
The lifetime National Leaguer could not get a grip on American League pitching, and was dealt to the San Diego Padres in July 2004. He continued to struggle in spacious Petco Park, and was not tendered a contract for 2005.

=== Cincinnati Reds (2005–2006) ===
Needing a veteran infielder, the Reds signed Aurilia to a minor league contract on January 22, 2005. The versatile infielder played well for the Reds, collecting 14 home runs and 68 RBI while playing games at shortstop, second base, and third base. The Reds then re-signed him on January 8, 2006.

Aurilia served as an everyday player rotating between shortstop, second base, first base and third base for the Reds in 2006. He finished the year with 23 home runs, 70 RBI, and a batting average of exactly .300—his highest in all three categories since 2001.

=== Second stint with San Francisco Giants (2007–2009) ===
In the 2006 offseason, Aurilia signed a two-year, $8 million contract with his old team, the Giants. During the 2007 season, he appeared in 99 games (mostly at first base), starting in 81 of them. Aurilia was placed on the 15-day disabled list with a neck injury that had been slow to heal, limiting his range of movement and causing headaches. At the time, he was batting only .236 with two home runs. Aurilia returned to the Giants' lineup on July 4, hitting a home run in a 9–5 win over the Cincinnati Reds. He finished the season batting .252 with five home runs, 33 RBI, and a .304 on-base percentage. Aurilia posted better numbers in each of those categories during the 2008 season, where he remained generally healthy throughout the year, one factor that led him to have considerably more playing time (99 games started).

On February 9, 2009, Aurilia re-signed with the San Francisco Giants to a minor league deal. It was announced on April 4 that Aurilia had made the Giants final roster. He went on to appear in 60 games during the 2009 season, starting in 22 of them, playing either first or third base. There was considerable uncertainty whether Aurilia would stay with the team for the entire season, but he was placed on the DL twice in order to free up a roster spot long enough for the September roster expansion. Knowing that the organization would not be bringing him back for the 2010 season, Aurilia played his final game as a Giant on October 1 at home against the Arizona Diamondbacks, receiving standing ovations from the home fans in appreciation for 12 years with the team.

=== Retirement ===
Aurilia announced his retirement on April 11, 2010. He is currently a member of NBC Sports Bay Area.

=== Career statistics ===
In 1652 games over 15 seasons, Aurilia posted a .275 batting average (1576-for-5721) with 745 runs, 301 doubles, 22 triples, 186 home runs, 756 RBI, 450 bases on balls, .328 on-base percentage and .433 slugging percentage. He finished his career with a .976 fielding percentage playing at shortstop, first, second and third base. In 25 postseason games, he hit .224 (22-for-98) with 17 runs, 6 doubles, 6 home runs, 18 RBI and 7 walks.

== Personal life ==
He finished second in a pro on pro challenge on Guy's Grocery Games on September 20, 2015. His charity was the Make-A-Wish Foundation.

Aurilia married Raquel Garcia on January 18, 1997, with whom he has two sons: Chaz Aiden, (born August 18, 2001) and Gavin Shea, (born October 1, 2003). Both he and his wife appeared as Jurors No. 9 and 10 in episodes of General Hospital which aired on December 11 and 12, 2003. The storyline was the trial of Sonny Corinthos, played by Maurice Benard who made the arrangement possible and is a cousin of Aurilia's Giants teammate Marvin Benard.

He and his family reside in homes in Healdsburg, California and Phoenix, Arizona.

== See also ==
- List of NL Silver Slugger Winners at Shortstop
