= Félix Rodríguez (baseball) =

Dominican baseball player (born 1972)

- Relief pitcher
- Born: September 9, 1972 (age 52); Montecristi, Dominican Republic
- Batted: Right Threw: Right

Professional debut
- MLB: May 13, 1995, for the Los Angeles Dodgers
- KBO: June 1, 2007, for the Kia Tigers

Last appearance
- MLB: September 30, 2006, for the Washington Nationals
- KBO: August 23, 2007, for the Kia Tigers

MLB statistics
- Win–loss record: 38–26
- Earned run average: 3.71
- Strikeouts: 512

KBO statistics
- Win–loss record: 0–1
- Earned run average: 3.13
- Strikeouts: 15
- Stats at Baseball Reference

Teams
- Los Angeles Dodgers (1995); Cincinnati Reds (1997); Arizona Diamondbacks (1998); San Francisco Giants (1999–2004); Philadelphia Phillies (2004); New York Yankees (2005); Washington Nationals (2006); Kia Tigers (2007)

Félix Antonio Rodríguez (born September 9, 1972) is a Dominican former Major League Baseball relief pitcher.

== Major league career (1996–2006) ==
Rodríguez was signed by the Los Angeles Dodgers in 1989 as a free agent, originally as a catcher. He batted .291 as a catcher, but his arm was so impressive that the organization moved him to the mound in 1993. During the northern hemisphere winter, the Dodgers sent Rodríguez to play for their Australian affiliate the Adelaide Giants in the Australian Baseball League in 1993 as part of his pitching development.

He began his major league career in 1995 with the Dodgers, was on waivers throughout 1996, was picked up by the Cincinnati Reds, where he played in 1997. In 1998, he played for the Arizona Diamondbacks, then with the San Francisco Giants from 1999-2004. He started 2004 with the Giants before being traded to the Philadelphia Phillies. It was with the Giants that Rodriguez had several crucial postseason failures. In Game 2 of the 2000 NLDS, he allowed a two-run homer to Edgardo Alfonzo of the New York Mets in the 9th inning and later an RBI single in the 10th inning that won the game for the Mets.

In Game Two of the 2002 World Series, Rodriguez gave up a two-run home run to Tim Salmon of the Angels in the eighth inning that proved to be the deciding blow. In Game Six of the 2002 World Series, he gave up the rally-starting three-run home run to Angels first baseman Scott Spiezio that started the rally that lost the game for the Giants—a game in which the Giants had led 5–0 at one point. The resulting loss is often cited as the decisive turning point in the series. And in the 2003 NLDS Rodriguez gave up a key two out, two run single in Game 4 that eventually proved the difference in the game that won the series for the Florida Marlins. He began 2005 with the New York Yankees, after being traded from the Phillies for center fielder Kenny Lofton in a one-for-one deal. In spring training 2006, he signed with the Montreal Expos, he was designated for assignment at the end of the season.

== Years after Majors (2007–2009) ==
He signed a minor league deal with the Florida Marlins but didn't make the team and was released on March 28. He finished the 2007 season playing for the Kia Tigers in the Korea Baseball Organization.

In 2008, Rodríguez played for the Camden Riversharks in the independent Atlantic League and had a 1.09 ERA in 32 games. In February 2009, he signed a minor league contract with the Boston Red Sox. Though he did not make the spring training roster and was released. He returned to the Camden Riversharks for the 2009 season.
