= Russ Ortiz =

American baseball player (born 1974)

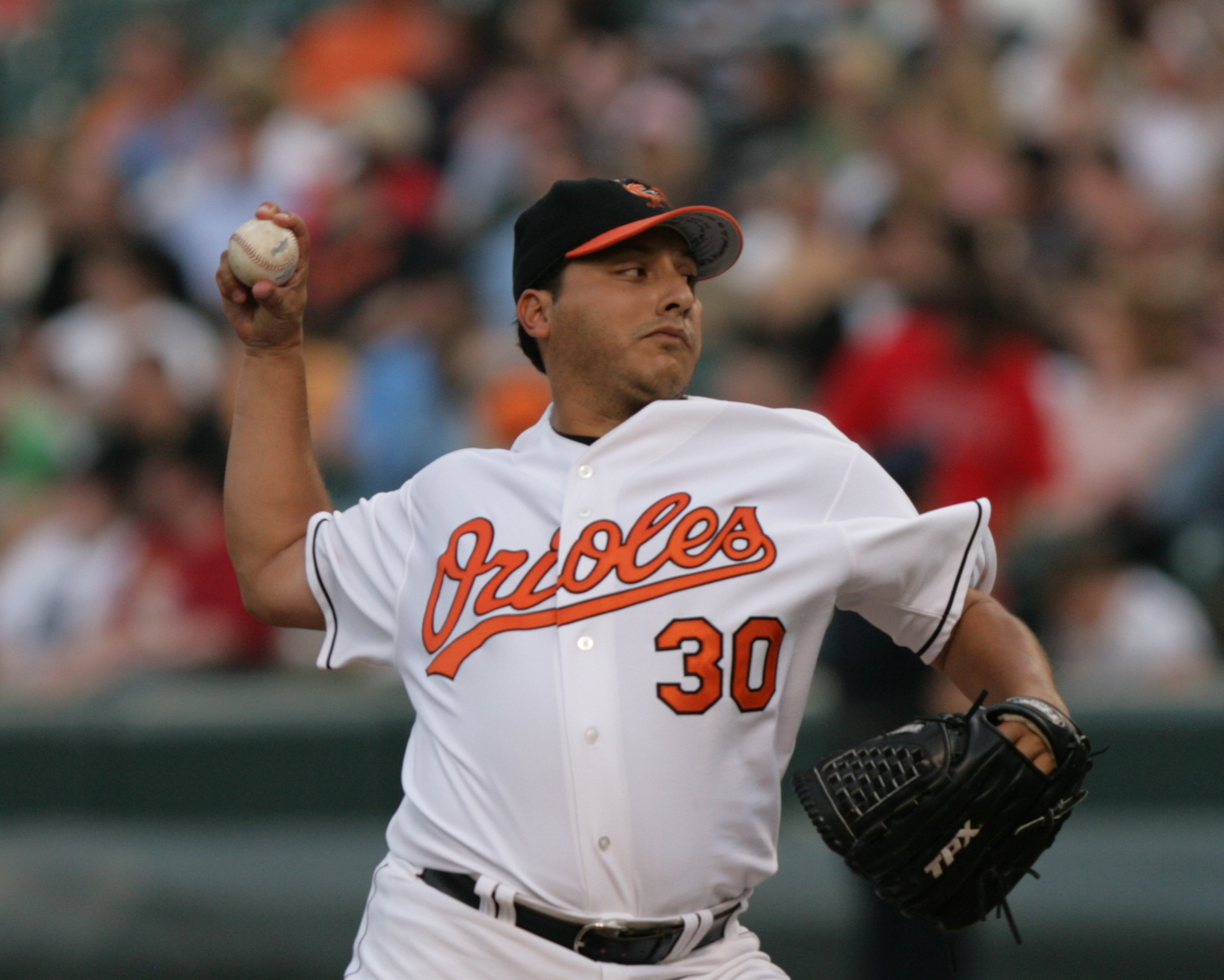
- Ortiz with the Baltimore Orioles in 2006
- Pitcher
- Born: June 5, 1974 (age 52); Van Nuys, California, U.S.
- Batted: Right Threw: Right

MLB debut
- April 2, 1998, for the San Francisco Giants

Last MLB appearance
- April 17, 2010, for the Los Angeles Dodgers

MLB statistics
- Win–loss record: 113–89
- Earned run average: 4.51
- Strikeouts: 1,192
- Stats at Baseball Reference

Teams
- San Francisco Giants (1998–2002); Atlanta Braves (2003–2004); Arizona Diamondbacks (2005–2006); Baltimore Orioles (2006); San Francisco Giants (2007); Houston Astros (2009); Los Angeles Dodgers (2010)

Career highlights and awards
- All-Star (2003); NL wins leader (2003)

Russell Reid Ortiz (born June 5, 1974) is an American former professional baseball pitcher. He played in Major League Baseball (MLB) for the San Francisco Giants, Atlanta Braves, Arizona Diamondbacks, Baltimore Orioles, Houston Astros, and Los Angeles Dodgers. He is 6 ft 1 in (1.85 m) tall, and weighs 220 pounds.

== Early life ==
Russell Reid Ortiz was born on June 5, 1974, in Van Nuys, California. He attended Montclair College Preparatory in Van Nuys, California.

== College career ==
Ortiz attended University of Oklahoma. In 1994, he pitched for a Sooners squad that would win the College World Series. In 38 innings, he had three saves and 30 strikeouts. In 1994, he played collegiate summer baseball in the Cape Cod Baseball League for the Yarmouth-Dennis Red Sox.

== Professional career ==
=== Draft and minor leagues ===
The right-hander was selected by the San Francisco Giants in the 4th round of the June 1995 Major League Baseball draft. He was drafted as a closer, but converted to the starting rotation while in the Giants' farm system.

=== San Francisco Giants (1998–2002) ===
On April 2, 1998, Ortiz made his major league debut in relief, collecting four strikeouts over two innings. The rookie bounced all over the Giants pitching staff and between San Francisco and Triple-A Fresno, working in relief, out of the rotation and in the minors as injuries and inconsistency plagued the Giants rotation.

In 1999, Ortiz came into his own and held on to his spot in the Giants' rotation, jumping on the scene as one of the National League's premier starters. His 18 wins was good for a tie of fourth in the NL and was in the top ten in the senior circuit in many other pitching statistics.

2000 was a tale of two seasons for Ortiz, as he was rocked hard before the All-Star break to a tune of three wins, eight losses and 7.55 ERA falling out of favor with manager Dusty Baker. He allowed ten runs in a game versus the Milwaukee Brewers on May 21, 2000. Despite the ten runs, Ortiz won the game as the Giants outslugged Milwaukee 16–10, making Ortiz the first pitcher since Bob Friend in 1954 to allow ten or more runs and still earn a win. Injuries in the second half of the season gave Ortiz the opportunity to redeem himself, and the California native shined. His 10–4 record and 3.22 ERA after the mid-summer classic helped San Francisco into the National League playoffs, and Ortiz started Game 3 of 2000 NLDS versus the New York Mets.

Ortiz returned to form in 2001 owning a 17–9 record a solid 3.29 ERA, anchoring the pitching staff for a competitive Giants squad. He also set career highs in innings (218 2/3 innings) and strikeouts (169).

2002 would prove to be another good effort on Ortiz's part as he and the Giants came within one game of a world championship. Yet again, Ortiz had another stellar second half effort helping the Giants capture the 2002 NL Wild Card. His personal six-game winning streak down the stretch propelled San Francisco into the playoffs and Ortiz captured two more victories (with a 2.19 ERA) over Atlanta in the Division Series. He was not as successful however in the NLCS versus St. Louis surrendering four runs in 4 2/3 innings in Game 3 of that series. The World Series versus the Angels also featured two polar opposite games for the starter. The Halos shelled him for seven runs in Game 2 of the World Series, as the Giants went on to lose 11–10. He returned to pitch the pivotal Game 6, and again redeemed himself working 6 1/3 innings of two-hit baseball before giving up consecutive singles in the seventh inning. Manager Dusty Baker gave him the game ball when he took him out, assuming they would hold on to a 5–0 lead. The Angels came back to win the game by a final score of 6–5, and went on to win the World Series in seven games.

Years later, Ortiz reflected on the moment of getting the ball from Baker, stating that it was an "honor" getting the ball as a sign of Baker's affection for his players, and Ortiz stated that he has it displayed in his office; while he mused that he wish he had not been taken out, he stated that if "You hand it off to those three guys, I guarantee you if there was a chance again, it would’ve gone our way.”

=== Atlanta Braves (2003–2004) ===
Ortiz landed on the trade block in the 2002 offseason and was dealt to Atlanta for pitchers Damian Moss and Merkin Valdéz on December 17, 2002. United with pitching guru Leo Mazzone, Ortiz put together a spectacular season, going 21–7 with a 3.81 ERA and collecting his only All-Star nod. With Ortiz as staff ace, the Braves won their 12th consecutive NL East title, and Ortiz took fourth place in the NL Cy Young voting. In a demonstration of how far the pitcher had come, Ortiz pitched a 1–0 complete game shutout and knocked in the game's only run against the eventual world champion Florida Marlins. Ortiz lost Game 1 of the 2003 NLDS against Chicago however, but once again bounced back to win Game 4 and force a deciding Game 5 that Atlanta would lose.

Ortiz displayed more pitching prowess in 2004 helping Atlanta to another division title while collecting a 15–9 record, with a slightly inflated 4.19 ERA. Another stellar late season game came in Montréal on September 4, as Ortiz carried a perfect game into the 6th inning and allowed only two Expos to reach second base in the complete game 9–0 shutout. That improved Ortiz to 5–0 with 1.13 ERA against the Expos in 2004. Still, Ortiz and the Braves could not advance past the first round of the playoffs as he was clobbered by Houston for 5 runs in 3 innings as the Astros advanced.

=== Arizona Diamondbacks (2005–2006) ===
Ortiz was on the move again in 2005, this time to Arizona as the Diamondbacks tried to overhaul their starting rotation and line-up after a 111 loss season the year before. Arizona's hefty four-year, $33 million deal lured the righty to the desert. The pitcher who had never spent as much as a day on the disabled list in the previous seven seasons, battled a rib fracture after winning four of his first six games for the D-Backs. When he returned from the disabled list, Ortiz proceeded to lose six straight decisions and ended the year on a 1–9 slide.

2006 saw another injury (this time to his calf) and more poor pitching performances. On June 13, 2006, Ortiz was designated for assignment by the Diamondbacks as he sunk to 0–5 with an ERA of 7.54. The five losses contributed to 1–14 mark from May 2005 to May 2006, and the Diamondbacks simply could not afford to allow Ortiz to work out his issues at the major league level. With nearly $22 million and over two-and-a-half years remaining on the contract, Arizona's cut of Ortiz is thought to be the most expensive release in Major League Baseball history.

=== Baltimore Orioles (2006) ===
On June 25, 2006, the Orioles signed Ortiz to a one-year deal. His first start for Baltimore and in the American League ended in a no decision on July 1 against one of his former clubs, the Atlanta Braves; but by the time the season ended, Ortiz had compiled a record of 0–8 with an ERA of 8.14.

To his credit up to this point, in 251 career games (241 starts) and 1,483.2 IP, Ortiz had 108 career wins to 76 losses, and an overall ERA of 4.28. He also had 1,072 career strikeouts to 773 walks. Ortiz had been a decent batter (for a pitcher) with a .208 lifetime batting average and 96 hits in 462 at-bats. He also had 22 career doubles, 6 career home runs and 44 total RBI. The pitcher also had a solid glove, committing only four errors in over 1,400 innings of work.

=== Return to San Francisco Giants (2007) ===
Ortiz was picked up by the Giants on January 9, 2007, and signed to a one-year contract for $380,000 to compete in spring training for the fifth starting position in the Giants' rotation. San Francisco general manager Brian Sabean noted that Ortiz while pitching winter ball in Puerto Rico showed both increased velocity and renewed movement in his pitches and was signed on that basis.

Ortiz won the fifth starter spot with an excellent spring training, posting a 3.00 ERA – over five points lower than his regular season ERA the previous year – in 18 innings pitched. In his second regular start, he posted his first win since 2005, and in his third start, he won again, this time defeating the Diamondbacks, who were still paying Ortiz the large majority of his salary.

However, later in the year, Ortiz was placed on the DL for an inflamed elbow, and when top prospect Tim Lincecum shined in his place, Ortiz was sent to the bullpen after his return. Ortiz was later placed again on the DL for a forearm strain and he returned in early August. On August 21, 2007, Ortiz left a game in the 5th inning after throwing three balls. Ortiz appeared to be suffering from elbow pain. Ortiz had missed 73 games in 2007 before this injury. Ortiz underwent Tommy John surgery, and missed the entire 2008 MLB season.

=== Houston Astros (2009) ===
On January 13, 2009, the Houston Astros signed Ortiz to a minor league contract with an invitation to spring training. Ortiz won the job as the fifth starter for the Astros with a 3.18 ERA in seven spring training games. Pitching in relief on April 8, 2009, he gave up a three-run home run to Mike Fontenot on his first pitch in an official major league game in almost two years. However, after struggling in his first outing, Ortiz started this season 2–0. After that he went 1–6. He had a record of 3–6 with a 5.57 ERA on July 30, 2009, when he was released by the Astros.

=== New York Yankees (2009) ===
On August 5, 2009, Ortiz signed a minor league contract with the New York Yankees. He reported to AAA Scranton/Wilkes-Barre and joined a minor league starting rotation. On August 17, Ortiz opted out of his contract with the Yankees to become a free agent.

=== Colorado Rockies (2009) ===
On August 22, 2009, Ortiz signed a minor-league deal with the Colorado Rockies and was assigned to the Triple-A affiliate Colorado Springs. After going 0–1 with a 7.07 ERA for Colorado Springs he was released by the Rockies on September 5, 2009.

=== Los Angeles Dodgers (2010) ===
On January 8, 2010, Ortiz signed a minor league deal with the Los Angeles Dodgers with an invite to spring training. After good performances in spring training games, Ortiz was added to the Dodgers Major League roster to start the season. He was 0–1 with a 10.29 ERA in six appearances for the Dodgers and then was designated for assignment on April 18. He chose to decline a minor league assignment and became a free agent. He announced his retirement shortly afterward.

== Personal life ==
Ortiz resides in Mesa, Arizona with his wife Stacy, two daughters Grace Elaine and Lilian Reid and son Hudson.

In high school he was a teammate of future major league DH Brad Fullmer. Fullmer's Angels faced off against Ortiz' Giants in the 2002 World Series, and a 7th inning, Game 6 single by Fullmer led to Ortiz's exit from the game (despite the Giants being up 5–0 at the time). Anaheim would rally to win the game 6–5 and eventually the World Series four games to three.

He was the creator/owner of 2nd Guy Golf, a clothing company. One-hundred percent of proceeds from sales went to charity, which ran for seven years. He also has served in volunteer work with youth sports such as athletic director and Little League.

== See also ==
- List of Major League Baseball annual wins leaders
