= 1983 California Angels season =

Major League Baseball season

1983 California Angels
- League: American League
- Division: West
- Ballpark: Anaheim Stadium
- City: Anaheim, California
- Record: 70–92 (.432)
- Divisional place: 5th
- Owner: Gene Autry
- General manager: Buzzie Bavasi
- Manager: John McNamara
- Television: KTLA
- Radio: KMPC (Ron Fairly, Bob Starr, Joe Buttitta, Allan Elconin); KLVE (Antonio Gonzalez, Ulpiano Cos Villa)
- Stats: ESPN.com; Baseball Reference

The 1983 California Angels season was the 23rd season of the California Angels franchise in the American League, the 18th in Anaheim, and their 18th season playing their home games at Anaheim Stadium. The Angels finished in fifth place in the American League west with a record of 70 wins and 92 losses.

== Offseason ==
- January 21, 1983: Ellis Valentine was signed as a free agent by the Angels.

== Regular season ==
=== Season standings ===
AL West
Team	W	L	Pct.	GB	Home	Road
Chicago White Sox	99	63	.611	—	55‍–‍26	44‍–‍37
Kansas City Royals	79	83	.488	20	45‍–‍36	34‍–‍47
Texas Rangers	77	85	.475	22	44‍–‍37	33‍–‍48
Oakland Athletics	74	88	.457	25	42‍–‍39	32‍–‍49
California Angels	70	92	.432	29	35‍–‍46	35‍–‍46
Minnesota Twins	70	92	.432	29	37‍–‍44	33‍–‍48
Seattle Mariners	60	102	.370	39	30‍–‍51	30‍–‍51

=== Record vs. opponents ===
1983 American League record Sources:
Team	BAL	BOS	CAL	CWS	CLE	DET	KC	MIL	MIN	NYY	OAK	SEA	TEX	TOR
Baltimore	—	8–5	7–5	7–5	6–7	5–8	8–4	11–2	8–4	6–7	8–4	8–4	9–3	7–6
Boston	5–8	—	6–6	6–6	7–6	4–9	5–7	4–9	5–7	7–6	8–4	7–5	7–5	7–6
California	5–7	6–6	—	3–10	8–4	4–8	6–7	6–6	6–7	5–7	5–8	6–7	6–7	4–8
Chicago	5–7	6–6	10–3	—	8–4	8–4	9–4	4–8	8–5	8–4	8–5	12–1	8–5	5–7
Cleveland	7–6	6–7	4–8	4–8	—	5–8	7–5	3–10	6–6	6–7	7–5	8–4	3–9	4–9
Detroit	8–5	9–4	8–4	4–8	8–5	—	7–5	6–7	9–3	5–8	6–6	8–4	8–4	6–7
Kansas City	4–8	7–5	7–6	4–9	5–7	5–7	—	6–6	6–7	6–6	7–6	8–5	8–5–1	6–6
Milwaukee	2–11	9–4	6–6	8–4	10–3	7–6	6–6	—	8–4	4–9	6–6	5–7	8–4	8–5
Minnesota	4–8	7–5	7–6	5–8	6–6	3–9	7–6	4–8	—	4–8	4–9	9–4	5–8	5–7
New York	7–6	6–7	7–5	4–8	7–6	8–5	6–6	9–4	8–4	—	8–4	7–5	7–5	7–6
Oakland	4–8	4–8	8–5	5–8	5–7	6–6	6–7	6–6	9–4	4–8	—	9–4	2–11	6–6
Seattle	4–8	5–7	7–6	1–12	4–8	4–8	5–8	7–5	4–9	5–7	4–9	—	6–7	4–8
Texas	3–9	5–7	7–6	5–8	9–3	4–8	5–8–1	4–8	8–5	5–7	11–2	7–6	—	4–8
Toronto	6–7	6–7	8–4	7–5	9–4	7–6	6–6	5–8	7–5	6–7	6–6	8–4	8–4	—

=== Roster ===
1983 California Angels
Roster
Pitchers: 48 Curt Brown; 36 Steve Brown; 23 Doug Corbett; 16 John Curtis; 43 Ken Forsch; 30 Dave Goltz; 41 Andy Hassler; 35 Tommy John; 24 Bruce Kison; 33 Bob Lacey; 27 Byron McLaughlin; 40 Luis Sánchez; 42 Rick Steirer; 35 Bill Travers; 39 Mike Witt; 38 Geoff Zahn	Catchers: 8 Bob Boone; 13 Joe Ferguson; 34 Jerry Narron; 3 Mike O'Berry; Infielders: 48,31 Ricky Adams; 7 Rick Burleson; 29 Rod Carew; 11 Doug DeCinces; 10 Tim Foli; 4 Bobby Grich; 15 Ron Jackson; 28 Steve Lubratich; 30 Dick Schofield; 6 Daryl Sconiers; 9 Rob Wilfong	Outfielders: 12 Juan Beníquez; 37 Mike Brown; 32 Bobby Clark; 5 Brian Downing; 19 Fred Lynn; 20 Gary Pettis; 17 Ellis Valentine; Other batters: 44 Reggie Jackson	Manager: 2 John McNamara; Coaches: 49 Bob Clear; 18 Preston Gómez; 1 Bobby Knoop; 47 Tom Morgan; 50 Jimmie Reese

== Player stats ==
=== Batting ===
==== Starters by position ====
Note: Pos = Position; G = Games played; AB = At bats; H = Hits; Avg. = Batting average; HR = Home runs; RBI = Runs batted in

Pos	Player	G	AB	H	Avg.	HR	RBI
C	Bob Boone	142	468	120	.256	9	52
1B	Rod Carew	129	472	160	.339	2	44
2B	Bobby Grich	120	387	113	.292	16	62
SS	Tim Foli	88	330	83	.252	2	29
3B	Doug DeCinces	95	370	104	.281	18	65
LF	Brian Downing	113	403	99	.246	19	53
CF	Fred Lynn	117	437	119	.272	22	74
RF	Ellis Valentine	86	271	65	.240	13	43
DH	Reggie Jackson	116	397	77	.194	14	49

==== Other batters ====
Note: G = Games played; AB = At bats; H = Hits; Avg. = Batting average; HR = Home runs; RBI = Runs batted in

Player	G	AB	H	Avg.	HR	RBI
Ron Jackson	102	348	80	.230	8	39
Juan Beníquez	92	315	96	.305	3	34
Daryl Sconiers	106	314	86	.274	8	46
Bobby Clark	76	212	49	.231	5	21
Rob Wilfong	65	177	45	.254	2	17
Steve Lubratich	57	156	34	.218	0	7
Rick Burleson	33	119	34	.286	0	11
Ricky Adams	58	112	28	.250	2	6
Mike Brown	31	104	24	.231	3	9
Gary Pettis	22	85	25	.294	3	6
Mike O'Berry	26	60	10	.167	1	5
Dick Schofield	21	54	11	.204	3	4
Joe Ferguson	12	27	2	.074	0	2
Jerry Narron	10	22	3	.136	1	4

=== Pitching ===
==== Starting pitchers ====
Note: G = Games pitched; IP = Innings pitched; W = Wins; L = Losses; ERA = Earned run average; SO = Strikeouts

Player	G	IP	W	L	ERA	SO
Tommy John	34	234.2	11	13	4.33	65
Ken Forsch	31	219.1	11	12	4.06	81
Geoff Zahn	29	203.0	9	11	3.33	81

==== Other pitchers ====
Note: G = Games pitched; IP = Innings pitched; W = Wins; L = Losses; ERA = Earned run average; SO = Strikeouts

Player	G	IP	W	L	ERA	SO
Mike Witt	43	154.0	7	14	4.91	77
Bruce Kison	26	126.2	11	5	4.05	83
Dave Goltz	15	63.2	0	6	6.22	27
Rick Steirer	19	61.2	3	2	4.82	25
Byron McLaughlin	16	55.2	2	4	5.17	45
Steve Brown	12	46.0	2	3	3.52	23
Bill Travers	10	42.2	0	3	5.91	24

==== Relief pitchers ====
Note: G = Games pitched; W = Wins; L = Losses; SV = Saves; ERA = Earned run average; SO = Strikeouts

Player	G	W	L	SV	ERA	SO
Luis Sánchez	56	10	8	7	3.66	49
Andy Hassler	42	0	5	4	5.45	20
John Curtis	37	1	2	5	3.80	36
Doug Corbett	11	1	1	0	3.63	18
Curt Brown	10	1	1	0	7.31	7
Bob Lacey	8	1	2	0	5.19	7

== Farm system ==
Level	Team	League	Manager
AAA	Edmonton Trappers	Pacific Coast League	Moose Stubing
AA	Nashua Angels	Eastern League	Winston Llenas
A	Redwood Pioneers	California League	Jack Lind
A	Peoria Suns	Midwest League	Joe Coleman
A-Short Season	Salem Angels	Northwest League	Joe Maddon

LEAGUE CHAMPIONS: Redwood

Records
Preceded by 1982	California Angels seasons 1983	Succeeded by 1984
