= 1982 California Angels season =

Major League Baseball season

1982 California Angels
- American League West champions
- League: American League
- Division: West
- Ballpark: Anaheim Stadium
- City: Anaheim, California
- Record: 93–69 (.574)
- Divisional place: 1st
- Owner: Gene Autry
- General manager: Buzzie Bavasi
- Manager: Gene Mauch
- Television: KTLA
- Radio: KMPC (Ron Fairly, Bob Starr, Joe Buttitta)
- Stats: ESPN.com; Baseball Reference

The 1982 California Angels season was the 22nd season of the California Angels franchise in the American League, the 17th in Anaheim, and their 17th season playing their home games at Anaheim Stadium. The Angels finished first in the American League West for the second time in team history, with a record of 93 wins and 69 losses. However, the Angels fell to the Milwaukee Brewers in the ALCS in 5 games. This was future Hall of Famer Reggie Jackson’s first season with the Angels.

== Offseason ==
- December 6, 1981: Bob Boone was purchased by the Angels from the Philadelphia Phillies.
- December 7, 1981: José Moreno was selected by the Angels from the San Diego Padres in the rule 5 draft.
- December 8, 1981: Dave Smith was selected by the Angels from the New York Mets in the minor league draft.
- December 11, 1981: Brian Harper was traded by the Angels to the Pittsburgh Pirates for Tim Foli.
- January 22, 1982: Reggie Jackson was signed as a free agent by the California Angels.
- January 28, 1982: Dan Ford was traded by the California Angels to the Baltimore Orioles for Doug DeCinces and Jeff Schneider.

== Regular season ==
- April 27, 1982: Reggie Jackson returned to Yankee Stadium with the Angels. He broke out of a terrible season-starting slump to hit a home run off former teammate Ron Guidry. The at-bat began with Yankee fans, angry at owner George Steinbrenner for letting Jackson get away, starting the "Reg-GIE!" chant, and ended it with the fans chanting "Steinbrenner sucks!" By the time of Jackson's election to the Hall of Fame, Steinbrenner had begun to say that letting him go was the biggest mistake he has made as Yankee owner.

=== Season standings ===
AL West
| Team | W | L | Pct. | GB | Home | Road |
|---|---|---|---|---|---|---|
| California Angels | 93 | 69 | .574 | — | 52‍–‍29 | 41‍–‍40 |
| Kansas City Royals | 90 | 72 | .556 | 3 | 56‍–‍25 | 34‍–‍47 |
| Chicago White Sox | 87 | 75 | .537 | 6 | 49‍–‍31 | 38‍–‍44 |
| Seattle Mariners | 76 | 86 | .469 | 17 | 42‍–‍39 | 34‍–‍47 |
| Oakland Athletics | 68 | 94 | .420 | 25 | 36‍–‍45 | 32‍–‍49 |
| Texas Rangers | 64 | 98 | .395 | 29 | 38‍–‍43 | 26‍–‍55 |
| Minnesota Twins | 60 | 102 | .370 | 33 | 37‍–‍44 | 23‍–‍58 |

=== Record vs. opponents ===
1982 American League record Sources:
| Team | BAL | BOS | CAL | CWS | CLE | DET | KC | MIL | MIN | NYY | OAK | SEA | TEX | TOR |
|---|---|---|---|---|---|---|---|---|---|---|---|---|---|---|
| Baltimore | — | 4–9 | 7–5 | 5–7 | 6–7 | 7–6 | 4–8 | 9–4–1 | 8–4 | 11–2 | 7–5 | 7–5 | 9–3 | 10–3 |
| Boston | 9–4 | — | 7–5 | 4–8 | 6–7 | 8–5 | 6–6 | 4–9 | 6–6 | 7–6 | 8–4 | 7–5 | 10–2 | 7–6 |
| California | 5–7 | 5–7 | — | 8–5 | 8–4 | 5–7 | 7–6 | 6–6 | 7–6 | 7–5 | 9–4 | 10–3 | 8–5 | 8–4 |
| Chicago | 7–5 | 8–4 | 5–8 | — | 6–6 | 9–3 | 3–10 | 3–9 | 7–6 | 8–4 | 9–4 | 6–7 | 8–5 | 8–4 |
| Cleveland | 7–6 | 7–6 | 4–8 | 6–6 | — | 6–7 | 2–10 | 7–6 | 8–4 | 4–9 | 4–8 | 9–3 | 7–5 | 7–6 |
| Detroit | 6–7 | 5–8 | 7–5 | 3–9 | 7–6 | — | 6–6 | 3–10 | 9–3 | 8–5 | 9–3 | 6–6 | 8–4 | 6–7 |
| Kansas City | 8–4 | 6–6 | 6–7 | 10–3 | 10–2 | 6–6 | — | 7–5 | 7–6 | 5–7 | 7–6 | 7–6 | 7–6 | 4–8 |
| Milwaukee | 4–9–1 | 9–4 | 6–6 | 9–3 | 6–7 | 10–3 | 5–7 | — | 7–5 | 8–5 | 7–5 | 8–4 | 7–5 | 9–4 |
| Minnesota | 4–8 | 6–6 | 6–7 | 6–7 | 4–8 | 3–9 | 6–7 | 5–7 | — | 2–10 | 3–10 | 5–8 | 5–8 | 5–7 |
| New York | 2–11 | 6–7 | 5–7 | 4–8 | 9–4 | 5–8 | 7–5 | 5–8 | 10–2 | — | 7–5 | 6–6 | 7–5 | 6–7 |
| Oakland | 5–7 | 4–8 | 4–9 | 4–9 | 8–4 | 3–9 | 6–7 | 5–7 | 10–3 | 5–7 | — | 6–7 | 5–8 | 3–9 |
| Seattle | 5–7 | 5–7 | 3–10 | 7–6 | 3–9 | 6–6 | 6–7 | 4–8 | 8–5 | 6–6 | 7–6 | — | 9–4 | 7–5 |
| Texas | 3–9 | 2–10 | 5–8 | 5–8 | 5–7 | 4–8 | 6–7 | 5–7 | 8–5 | 5–7 | 8–5 | 4–9 | — | 4–8 |
| Toronto | 3–10 | 6–7 | 4–8 | 4–8 | 6–7 | 7–6 | 8–4 | 4–9 | 7–5 | 7–6 | 9–3 | 5–7 | 8–4 | — |

=== Transactions ===
- April 11, 1982: Ron Jackson was signed as a free agent with the California Angels.
- May 12, 1982: Tom Brunansky, Mike Walters, and $400,000 were traded by the Angels to the Minnesota Twins for Doug Corbett and Rob Wilfong.
- August 2, 1982: Luis Tiant was purchased by the Angels from Tabasco of the Mexican League.
- August 31, 1982: The Angels traded a player to be named later to the New York Yankees for Tommy John. The Angels completed the trade by sending Dennis Rasmussen to the Yankees on November 24.

=== Roster ===
1982 California Angels
Roster
| Pitchers: 46 Don Aase; 34 Stan Bahnsen; 23 Doug Corbett; 16 John Curtis; 43 Ken Forsch; 30 Dave Goltz; 41 Andy Hassler; 35 Tommy John; 24 Bruce Kison; 22 Mickey Mahler; 21 Ángel Moreno; 45 Steve Renko; 40 Luis Sánchez; 42 Rick Steirer; 33 Luis Tiant; 39 Mike Witt; 38 Geoff Zahn | Catchers: 8 Bob Boone; 13 Joe Ferguson; Infielders: 48 Ricky Adams; 7 Rick Burleson; 29 Rod Carew; 11 Doug DeCinces; 10,20 Tim Foli; 4 Bobby Grich; 15 Ron Jackson; 2 Mick Kelleher; 21 Jose Moreno; 6 Daryl Sconiers; 9 Rob Wilfong | Outfielders: 12 Juan Beníquez; 32 Bobby Clark; 5 Brian Downing; 44 Reggie Jackson; 19 Fred Lynn; 20 Gary Pettis; Other batters: 25 Don Baylor | Manager: 3 Gene Mauch; Coaches: 49 Bob Clear; 18 Preston Gómez; 1 Bobby Knoop; 47 Tom Morgan; 50 Jimmie Reese; 17 Merv Rettenmund |

== Player stats ==
| = Indicates team leader |

| = Indicates league leader |

=== Batting ===
==== Starters by position ====
Note: Pos = Position; G = Games played; AB = At bats; H = Hits; Avg. = Batting average; HR = Home runs; RBI = Runs batted in

| Pos | Player | G | AB | H | Avg. | HR | RBI |
|---|---|---|---|---|---|---|---|
| C | Bob Boone | 143 | 472 | 121 | .256 | 7 | 58 |
| 1B | Rod Carew | 138 | 523 | 167 | .319 | 3 | 44 |
| 2B | Bobby Grich | 145 | 506 | 132 | .261 | 19 | 65 |
| 3B | Doug DeCinces | 153 | 575 | 173 | .301 | 30 | 97 |
| SS | Tim Foli | 150 | 480 | 121 | .252 | 3 | 56 |
| LF | Brian Downing | 158 | 623 | 175 | .281 | 28 | 84 |
| CF | Fred Lynn | 138 | 472 | 141 | .299 | 21 | 86 |
| RF | Reggie Jackson | 153 | 530 | 146 | .275 | 39 | 101 |
| DH | Don Baylor | 157 | 608 | 160 | .263 | 24 | 93 |

==== Other batters ====
Note: G = Games played; AB = At bats; H = Hits; Avg. = Batting average; HR = Home runs; RBI = Runs batted in

| Player | G | AB | H | Avg. | HR | RBI |
|---|---|---|---|---|---|---|
| Juan Beniquez | 112 | 196 | 52 | .265 | 3 | 24 |
| Ron Jackson | 53 | 142 | 47 | .331 | 2 | 19 |
| Rob Wilfong | 55 | 102 | 25 | .245 | 1 | 11 |
| Bobby Clark | 102 | 90 | 19 | .211 | 2 | 8 |
| Joe Ferguson | 36 | 84 | 19 | .226 | 3 | 8 |
| Mick Kelleher | 34 | 49 | 8 | .163 | 0 | 1 |
| Rick Burleson | 11 | 45 | 7 | .156 | 0 | 2 |
| Ricky Adams | 8 | 14 | 2 | .143 | 0 | 0 |
| Daryl Sconiers | 12 | 13 | 2 | .154 | 0 | 2 |
| Gary Pettis | 10 | 5 | 1 | .200 | 1 | 1 |
| José Moreno | 11 | 3 | 0 | .000 | 0 | 0 |

=== Pitching ===
==== Starting pitchers ====
Note: G = Games pitched; IP = Innings pitched; W = Wins; L = Losses; ERA = Earned run average; SO = Strikeouts

| Player | G | IP | W | L | ERA | SO |
|---|---|---|---|---|---|---|
| Geoff Zahn | 34 | 229.1 | 18 | 8 | 3.73 | 81 |
| Ken Forsch | 37 | 228.0 | 13 | 11 | 3.87 | 73 |
| Tommy John | 7 | 35.0 | 4 | 2 | 3.86 | 14 |
| Luis Tiant | 6 | 29.2 | 2 | 2 | 5.76 | 30 |

==== Other pitchers ====
Note: G = Games pitched; IP = Innings pitched; W = Wins; L = Losses; ERA = Earned run average; SO = Strikeouts

| Player | G | IP | W | L | ERA | SO |
|---|---|---|---|---|---|---|
| Mike Witt | 33 | 179.2 | 8 | 6 | 3.51 | 85 |
| Steve Renko | 31 | 156.0 | 11 | 6 | 4.44 | 81 |
| Bruce Kison | 33 | 142.0 | 10 | 5 | 3.17 | 86 |
| Dave Goltz | 28 | 86.0 | 8 | 5 | 4.08 | 49 |
| Angel Moreno | 13 | 49.1 | 3 | 7 | 4.74 | 22 |

==== Relief pitchers ====
Note: G = Games pitched; W = Wins; L = Losses; SV = Saves; ERA = Earned run average; SO = Strikeouts

| Player | G | W | L | SV | ERA | SO |
|---|---|---|---|---|---|---|
| Doug Corbett | 33 | 1 | 7 | 8 | 5.05 | 37 |
| Andy Hassler | 54 | 2 | 1 | 4 | 2.78 | 38 |
| Luis Sánchez | 46 | 7 | 4 | 5 | 3.21 | 58 |
| Don Aase | 24 | 3 | 3 | 4 | 3.46 | 40 |
| Rick Steirer | 10 | 1 | 0 | 0 | 3.76 | 14 |
| John Curtis | 8 | 0 | 1 | 1 | 6.00 | 10 |
| Stan Bahnsen | 7 | 0 | 1 | 0 | 4.66 | 5 |
| Mickey Mahler | 6 | 2 | 0 | 0 | 1.13 | 5 |

== Game log ==
1982 Game Log: 93–69 (Home: 52–29; Away: 41–40)
April: 15–7 (Home: 9–0; Away: 6–7)

| # | Date | Time (PT) | Opponent | Score | Win | Loss | Save | Attendance | Record | Box/ Streak |

May: 16–11 (Home: 9–7; Away: 7–4)

| # | Date | Time (PT) | Opponent | Score | Win | Loss | Save | Attendance | Record | Box/ Streak |
|---|---|---|---|---|---|---|---|---|---|---|
| — | May 24 | | @ Red Sox | Postponed (Rain); Makeup: August 26 | | | | | | |

June: 14–12 (Home: 9–9; Away: 5–3)

| # | Date | Time (PT) | Opponent | Score | Win | Loss | Save | Attendance | Record | Box/ Streak |

July: 13–14 (Home: 8–5; Away: 5–9)

| # | Time (PT)Date | Opponent | Score | Win | Loss | Save | Attendance | Record | Box/ Streak |

August: 17–12 (Home: 7–6; Away: 10–6)

| # | Date | Time (PT) | Opponent | Score | Win | Loss | Save | Attendance | Record | Box/ Streak |
|---|---|---|---|---|---|---|---|---|---|---|
| — | August 9 | | @ Twins | Postponed (Schedule change); Makeup: August 12 | | | | | | |

September: 15–13 (Home: 7–2; Away: 8–11)

| # | Date | Time (PT) | Opponent | Score | Win | Loss | Save | Attendance | Record | Box/ Streak |

October: 3–0 (Home: 3–0; Away: 0–0)

| # | Date | Time (PT) | Opponent | Score | Win | Loss | Save | Attendance | Record | Box/ Streak |

Legend: = Win = Loss = Postponement
Bold = Angels team member

== ALCS ==
=== Game log ===
1982 Postseason Game Log: 2–3 (Home: 2–0; Away: 0–3)
1982 AL Championship Series: vs. Milwaukee Brewers 2–3 (Home: 2–0; Away: 0–3)

| # | Date | Time (PT) | Opponent | Score | Win | Loss | Save | Attendance | Record | Box/ Streak |
|---|---|---|---|---|---|---|---|---|---|---|
| 1 | October 5 | 5:25 p.m. PDT | Brewers | 8–3 | **John** (1–0) | Caldwell (0–1) | – | 64,406 | 1–0 | W1 |
| 2 | October 6 | 5:15 p.m. PDT | Brewers | 4–2 | **Kison** (1–0) | Vuckovich (0–1) | – | 64,179 | 2–0 | W2 |
| 3 | October 8 | 12:15 p.m. PDT | @ Brewers | 3–5 | Sutton (1–0) | **Zahn** (0–1) | Ladd (1) | 50,135 | 2–1 | L1 |
| 4 | October 9 | 10:00 a.m. PDT | @ Brewers | 5–9 | Haas (1–0) | **John** (1–1) | Slaton (1) | 51,003 | 2–2 | L2 |
| 5 | October 10 | 1:20 p.m. PDT | @ Brewers | 3–4 | McClure (1–0) | **Sánchez** (0–1) | Ladd (2) | 54,968 | 2–3 | L3 |

Legend: = Win = Loss = Postponement
Bold = Angels team member

=== Game 1, October 5 ===
Anaheim Stadium, Anaheim, California

| Team | 1 | 2 | 3 | 4 | 5 | 6 | 7 | 8 | 9 | R | H | E |
|---|---|---|---|---|---|---|---|---|---|---|---|---|
| Milwaukee | 0 | 2 | 1 | 0 | 0 | 0 | 0 | 0 | 0 | **3** | **7** | **2** |
| **California** | 1 | 0 | 4 | 2 | 1 | 0 | 0 | 0 | X | **8** | **10** | **0** |
W: Tommy John (1-0) L: Mike Caldwell (0-1) S: None
HR: **MIL** – Gorman Thomas (1) **CAL** – Fred Lynn (1)
Pitchers: **MIL** – Caldwell, Slaton (4), Ladd (7), Bernard (8) **CAL** – John
Attendance: 64,406

=== Game 2, October 6 ===
Anaheim Stadium, Anaheim, California

| Team | 1 | 2 | 3 | 4 | 5 | 6 | 7 | 8 | 9 | R | H | E |
|---|---|---|---|---|---|---|---|---|---|---|---|---|
| Milwaukee | 0 | 0 | 0 | 0 | 2 | 0 | 0 | 0 | 0 | **2** | **5** | **0** |
| **California** | 0 | 2 | 1 | 1 | 0 | 0 | 0 | 0 | x | **4** | **6** | **0** |
W: Bruce Kison (1-0) L: Pete Vuckovich (0-1) S: None
HR: **MIL** – Paul Molitor (1) **CAL** – Reggie Jackson (1)
Pitchers: **MIL** – Vuckovich **CAL** – Kison
Attendance: 64,179

=== Game 3, October 8 ===
County Stadium, Milwaukee, Wisconsin

| Team | 1 | 2 | 3 | 4 | 5 | 6 | 7 | 8 | 9 | R | H | E |
|---|---|---|---|---|---|---|---|---|---|---|---|---|
| California | 0 | 0 | 0 | 0 | 0 | 0 | 0 | 3 | 0 | **3** | **8** | **0** |
| **Milwaukee** | 0 | 0 | 0 | 3 | 0 | 0 | 2 | 0 | 0 | **5** | **6** | **0** |
W: Don Sutton (1-0) L: Geoff Zahn (0-1) S: Pete Ladd (1)
HR: **CAL** – Bob Boone (1) **MIL** – Paul Molitor (2)
Pitchers: **CAL** – Zahn, Witt (4), Hassler (7) **MIL** – Sutton, Ladd (8)
Attendance: 50,135

=== Game 4, October 9 ===
County Stadium, Milwaukee, Wisconsin

| Team | 1 | 2 | 3 | 4 | 5 | 6 | 7 | 8 | 9 | R | H | E |
|---|---|---|---|---|---|---|---|---|---|---|---|---|
| California | 0 | 0 | 0 | 0 | 0 | 1 | 4 | 0 | 0 | **5** | **5** | **3** |
| **Milwaukee** | 0 | 3 | 0 | 3 | 0 | 1 | 0 | 2 | 0 | **9** | **9** | **2** |
W: Moose Haas (1-0) L: Tommy John (0-1) S: Jim Slaton (1)
HR: **CAL** – Don Baylor (1) **MIL** – Mark Brouhard (1)
Pitchers: **CAL** – John, Goltz (4), Sanchez (8) **MIL** – Haas, Slaton (8)
Attendance: 51,003

=== Game 5, October 10 ===
County Stadium, Milwaukee, Wisconsin

| Team | 1 | 2 | 3 | 4 | 5 | 6 | 7 | 8 | 9 | R | H | E |
|---|---|---|---|---|---|---|---|---|---|---|---|---|
| California | 1 | 0 | 1 | 1 | 0 | 0 | 0 | 0 | 0 | **3** | **11** | **1** |
| **Milwaukee** | 1 | 0 | 0 | 1 | 0 | 0 | 2 | 0 | x | **4** | **6** | **4** |
W: Bob McClure (1-0) L: Luis Sánchez (0-1) S: Pete Ladd (2)
HR: **CAL** – None **MIL** – Ben Oglivie (1)
Pitchers: **CAL** – Kison, Sanchez (6), Hassler (7) **MIL** – Vuckovich, McClure (7), Ladd (9)
Attendance: 54,968

== Awards and honors ==
- Fred Lynn, American League Championship Series Most Valuable Player
- Reggie Jackson OF, American League Leader Home Runs (39)

All-Star Game

- Rod Carew
- Bobby Grich (starting 2B)
- Reggie Jackson (starting RF)
- Fred Lynn (starting CF)

== Farm system ==
| Level | Team | League | Manager |
|---|---|---|---|
| AAA | Spokane Indians | Pacific Coast League | Moose Stubing |
| AA | Holyoke Millers | Eastern League | Jack Hiatt |
| A | Redwood Pioneers | California League | Chris Cannizzaro |
| A | Danville Suns | Midwest League | Gus Gil and Aurelio Monteagudo |
| A-Short Season | Salem Angels | Northwest League | Joe Maddon |

LEAGUE CHAMPIONS: Salem

Records
| Preceded by 1981 | California Angels seasons 1982 | Succeeded by 1983 |
