= League Championship Series =

Major League Baseball postseason series

The League Championship Series (LCS) is the semifinal round of postseason play in Major League Baseball, featuring the American League Championship Series (ALCS) and the National League Championship Series (NLCS). The LCS has been conducted since 1969, determining the winner of the pennant for each league and each league's representative in the World Series. In 1981 and since 1995, the LCS matches up the winners of the Division Series from each league.

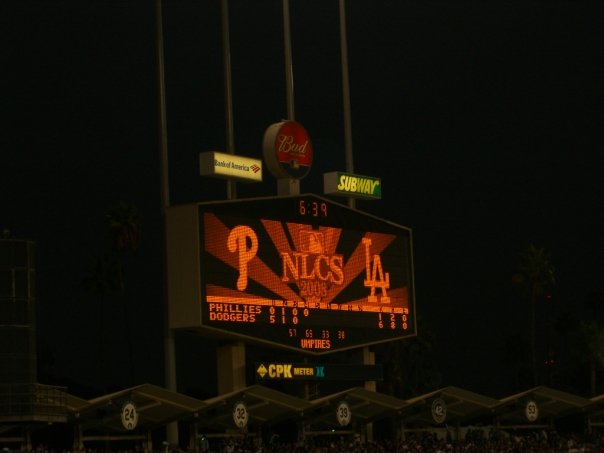
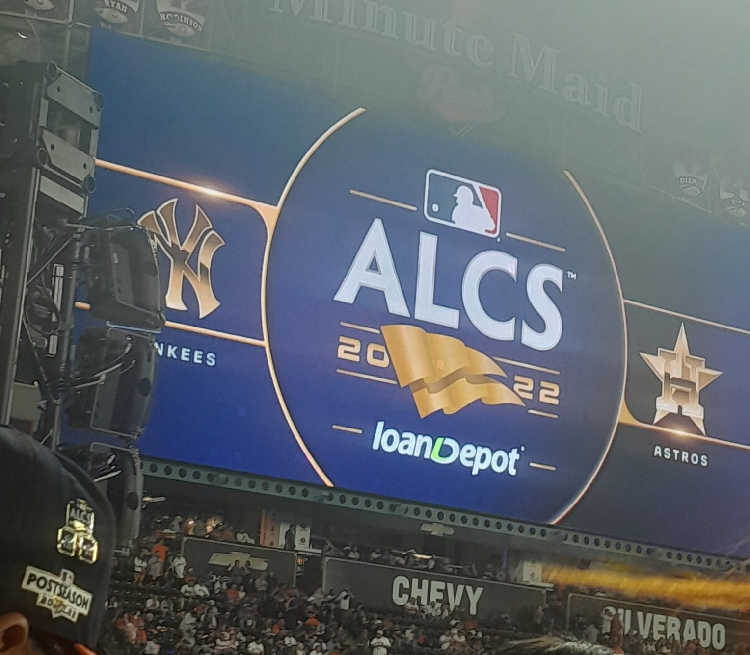
Photos showing the two LCS in pregame preparations (left: NLCS, 2008 and right: ALCS, 2022)

== History ==
Prior to 1969, the champion of both leagues was determined by regular season win-loss record. In instances of tiebreakers, there were tiebreaker contests held, which served as unofficial postseason games. The American League held a single-game tiebreaker in 1948 to determine the league champion for that season. The National League held a best-of-three tiebreaker series in 1946, 1951, 1959, and 1962.

In 1969, when both the American League and National League expanded from 10 teams to 12 (the American League added the Kansas City Royals and Seattle Pilots, and the National League added the Montreal Expos and San Diego Padres), both leagues split their teams into newly-formed East and West divisions. The League Championship Series was created as a new postseason round to determine the champion of each league and featuring the first-place teams from each of the new divisions.

For its first 16 seasons, the League Championship Series were best-of-five, using the 2–3 format in which the team without home field advantage hosted the first two games, and the team with it hosted the rest of the LCS, making it impossible for the disadvantaged team to win the series at home. It also allowed those teams the unusual luxury of starting a series at home, possibly having home-field advantage in a three-game series, and a guarantee that they play two games at home.

In 1985, the LCS was lengthened to best-of-seven games in the 2–3–2 format with the team holding home-field advantage opening the series at home and playing the next three games on the road, before returning home for two more possible games. The disadvantaged team would have had more games played at home than on the road if the series ends in five games.

Since 1995, the LCS has matched up the winners of the Division Series, which were added when both leagues realigned into three divisions.

Until 1998, the home-field advantage in the LCS was allocated on a rotating basis between the two (three from 1995 through 1997) division champions; since 1998, that advantage is given to the team with the better regular season record, except that if a division champion faces a wild card team, the division champion always gets home-field advantage regardless of record.

As of 2026, all thirty MLB teams have reached the LCS at least once. The Houston Astros and Milwaukee Brewers are the only teams to have played in and won both the ALCS and NLCS. Four teams have never lost an LCS: the Colorado Rockies (won in 2007), the Miami Marlins (won as the Florida Marlins in 1997 and 2003), the Tampa Bay Rays (won in 2008, 2020, and 2026), and the Texas Rangers (won in 2010, 2011, and 2023). The Seattle Mariners are the only team to have never won an LCS (lost in 1995, 2000, 2001, and 2025).

Nine managers have led a team to the ALCS in three consecutive seasons; the record for most consecutive ALCS appearances by a manager is jointly held by Joe Torre, who led the New York Yankees to four in a row (1998, 1999, 2000, 2001), and Dusty Baker, who led the Houston Astros to four in a row (2020, 2021, 2022, 2023). Seven managers have led a team to the NLCS in three consecutive seasons; however, the most consecutive NLCS appearances by one manager is held by Bobby Cox, who led the Atlanta Braves to eight straight from 1991 to 1999. Tony La Russa and Jim Leyland are the only managers to lead their teams to three consecutive League Championship Series appearances in both leagues.

The Milwaukee Brewers, an American League team between 1969 and 1997, and the Houston Astros, a National League team between 1962 and 2012, are the only franchises to play in and win both the ALCS and NLCS. The Astros won the NLCS in 2005, and the ALCS in 2017, 2019, 2021, and 2022. The Brewers won the ALCS in 1982 and the NLCS in 2026. The Astros made four NLCS appearances before moving to the AL in 2013, where they appeared in seven straight ALCS from 2017 to 2023. The Brewers have made 4 NLCS appearances since their lone ALCS appearance.

== Trophies ==
The William Harridge Trophy is awarded to the AL champion, named in honor of former AL president Will Harridge. The Warren C. Giles Trophy is awarded to the NL champion, named in honor of former NL president Warren Giles.

The League Championship Series Most Valuable Player Award is given to the most outstanding player in each LCS. The National League began its LCS MVP award in 1977, the American League began its LCS MVP award in 1980.

The MVP award has been given to a player on the losing team twice, in 1986 to Mike Scott of the Houston Astros and in 1987 to Jeffrey Leonard of the San Francisco Giants. The ALCS MVP Award is named in honor of former AL president Lee MacPhail.

== Results ==
=== American League Championship Series ===
Key
†	Wild card
*	MVP did not play for winning team

Year	Winning team	Manager	Games	Losing team	Manager	Series MVP
1969	Baltimore Orioles	Earl Weaver	3–0	Minnesota Twins	Billy Martin	
1970	Baltimore Orioles	Earl Weaver	3–0	Minnesota Twins	Bill Rigney	
1971	Baltimore Orioles	Earl Weaver	3–0	Oakland Athletics	Dick Williams	
1972	Oakland Athletics	Dick Williams	3–2	Detroit Tigers	Billy Martin	
1973	Oakland Athletics	Dick Williams	3–2	Baltimore Orioles	Earl Weaver	
1974	Oakland Athletics	Alvin Dark	3–1	Baltimore Orioles	Earl Weaver	
1975	Boston Red Sox	Darrell Johnson	3–0	Oakland Athletics	Alvin Dark	
1976	New York Yankees	Billy Martin	3–2	Kansas City Royals	Whitey Herzog	
1977	New York Yankees	Billy Martin	3–2	Kansas City Royals	Whitey Herzog	
1978	New York Yankees	Bob Lemon	3–1	Kansas City Royals	Whitey Herzog	
1979	Baltimore Orioles	Earl Weaver	3–1	California Angels	Jim Fregosi	
1980	Kansas City Royals	Jim Frey	3–0	New York Yankees	Dick Howser	Frank White, Kansas City
1981	New York Yankees	Bob Lemon	3–0	Oakland Athletics	Billy Martin	Graig Nettles, New York
1982	Milwaukee Brewers	Harvey Kuenn	3–2	California Angels	Gene Mauch	Fred Lynn, California*
1983	Baltimore Orioles	Joe Altobelli	3–1	Chicago White Sox	Tony La Russa	Mike Boddicker, Baltimore
1984	Detroit Tigers	Sparky Anderson	3–0	Kansas City Royals	Dick Howser	Kirk Gibson, Detroit
1985	Kansas City Royals	Dick Howser	4–3	Toronto Blue Jays	Bobby Cox	George Brett, Kansas City
1986	Boston Red Sox	John McNamara	4–3	California Angels	Gene Mauch	Marty Barrett, Boston
1987	Minnesota Twins	Tom Kelly	4–1	Detroit Tigers	Sparky Anderson	Gary Gaetti, Minnesota
1988	Oakland Athletics	Tony La Russa	4–0	Boston Red Sox	Joe Morgan	Dennis Eckersley, Oakland
1989	Oakland Athletics	Tony La Russa	4–1	Toronto Blue Jays	Cito Gaston	Rickey Henderson, Oakland
1990	Oakland Athletics	Tony La Russa	4–0	Boston Red Sox	Joe Morgan	Dave Stewart, Oakland
1991	Minnesota Twins	Tom Kelly	4–1	Toronto Blue Jays	Cito Gaston	Kirby Puckett, Minnesota
1992	Toronto Blue Jays	Cito Gaston	4–2	Oakland Athletics	Tony La Russa	Roberto Alomar, Toronto
1993	Toronto Blue Jays	Cito Gaston	4–2	Chicago White Sox	Gene Lamont	Dave Stewart, Toronto
1994	No Series due to a players' strike.					
1995	Cleveland Indians	Mike Hargrove	4–2	Seattle Mariners	Lou Piniella	Orel Hershiser, Cleveland
1996	New York Yankees	Joe Torre	4–1	Baltimore Orioles^{†}	Davey Johnson	Bernie Williams, New York
1997	Cleveland Indians	Mike Hargrove	4–2	Baltimore Orioles	Davey Johnson	Marquis Grissom, Cleveland
1998	New York Yankees	Joe Torre	4–2	Cleveland Indians	Mike Hargrove	David Wells, New York
1999	New York Yankees	Joe Torre	4–1	Boston Red Sox^{†}	Jimy Williams	Orlando Hernández, New York
2000	New York Yankees	Joe Torre	4–2	Seattle Mariners^{†}	Lou Piniella	David Justice, New York
2001	New York Yankees	Joe Torre	4–1	Seattle Mariners	Lou Piniella	Andy Pettitte, New York
2002	Anaheim Angels^{†}	Mike Scioscia	4–1	Minnesota Twins	Ron Gardenhire	Adam Kennedy, Anaheim
2003	New York Yankees	Joe Torre	4–3	Boston Red Sox^{†}	Grady Little	Mariano Rivera, New York
2004	Boston Red Sox^{†}	Terry Francona	4–3	New York Yankees	Joe Torre	David Ortiz, Boston
2005	Chicago White Sox	Ozzie Guillén	4–1	Los Angeles Angels of Anaheim	Mike Scioscia	Paul Konerko, Chicago
2006	Detroit Tigers^{†}	Jim Leyland	4–0	Oakland Athletics	Ken Macha	Plácido Polanco, Detroit
2007	Boston Red Sox	Terry Francona	4–3	Cleveland Indians	Eric Wedge	Josh Beckett, Boston
2008	Tampa Bay Rays	Joe Maddon	4–3	Boston Red Sox^{†}	Terry Francona	Matt Garza, Tampa Bay
2009	New York Yankees	Joe Girardi	4–2	Los Angeles Angels of Anaheim	Mike Scioscia	CC Sabathia, New York
2010	Texas Rangers	Ron Washington	4–2	New York Yankees^{†}	Joe Girardi	Josh Hamilton, Texas
2011	Texas Rangers	Ron Washington	4–2	Detroit Tigers	Jim Leyland	Nelson Cruz, Texas
2012	Detroit Tigers	Jim Leyland	4–0	New York Yankees	Joe Girardi	Delmon Young, Detroit
2013	Boston Red Sox	John Farrell	4–2	Detroit Tigers	Jim Leyland	Koji Uehara, Boston
2014	Kansas City Royals^{†}	Ned Yost	4–0	Baltimore Orioles	Buck Showalter	Lorenzo Cain, Kansas City
2015	Kansas City Royals	Ned Yost	4–2	Toronto Blue Jays	John Gibbons	Alcides Escobar, Kansas City
2016	Cleveland Indians	Terry Francona	4–1	Toronto Blue Jays^{†}	John Gibbons	Andrew Miller, Cleveland
2017	Houston Astros	A. J. Hinch	4–3	New York Yankees^{†}	Joe Girardi	Justin Verlander, Houston
2018	Boston Red Sox	Alex Cora	4–1	Houston Astros	A. J. Hinch	Jackie Bradley Jr., Boston
2019	Houston Astros	A. J. Hinch	4–2	New York Yankees	Aaron Boone	Jose Altuve, Houston
2020	Tampa Bay Rays	Kevin Cash	4–3	Houston Astros ^{†}	Dusty Baker	Randy Arozarena, Tampa Bay
2021	Houston Astros	Dusty Baker	4–2	Boston Red Sox^{†}	Alex Cora	Yordan Alvarez, Houston
2022	Houston Astros	Dusty Baker	4–0	New York Yankees	Aaron Boone	Jeremy Peña, Houston
2023	Texas Rangers^{†}	Bruce Bochy	4–3	Houston Astros	Dusty Baker	Adolis García, Texas
2024	New York Yankees	Aaron Boone	4–1	Cleveland Guardians	Stephen Vogt	Giancarlo Stanton, New York
2025	Toronto Blue Jays	John Schneider	4–3	Seattle Mariners	Dan Wilson	Vladimir Guerrero Jr., Toronto
2026	Tampa Bay Rays	Kevin Cash	4–2	Cleveland Guardians	Stephen Vogt	Freddy Peralta, Tampa Bay

==== Appearances by team ====
Apps	Team	Wins	Losses	Win %	Most recent win	Most recent appearance	Games won	Games lost	Game win %
19	New York Yankees	12	7	.632	2024	2024	54	45	.545
12	Boston Red Sox	6	6	.500	2018	2021	32	36	.471
11	Athletics	6	5	.545	1990	2006	23	23	.500
10	Baltimore Orioles	5	5	.500	1983	2014	21	20	.512
8	Kansas City Royals	4	4	.500	2015	2015	20	17	.541
8	Toronto Blue Jays	3	5	.375	2025	2025	20	27	.426
7	Houston Astros	4	3	.571	2022	2023	23	19	.548
7	Cleveland Guardians	3	4	.429	2016	2026	20	21	.488
7	Detroit Tigers	3	4	.429	2012	2013	18	15	.545
6	Los Angeles Angels	1	5	.167	2002	2009	13	19	.406
5	Minnesota Twins	2	3	.400	1991	2002	9	12	.429
4	Seattle Mariners	0	4	.000	Never	2025	8	16	.333
3	Tampa Bay Rays	3	0	1.000	2026	2026	12	8	.600
3	Chicago White Sox	1	2	.333	2005	2005	7	8	.467
3	Texas Rangers	3	0	1.000	2023	2023	12	7	.632
1	Milwaukee Brewers (Note: The Milwaukee Brewers moved to the National League in 1998.)	1	0	1.000	1982	1982	3	2	.600

==== Years of appearance ====
In the sortable table below, teams are ordered first by number of wins, then by number of appearances, and finally by year of first appearance. In the "Season(s)" column, bold years indicate winning appearances.

Apps	Team	Wins	Losses	Win %	Season(s)
19	New York Yankees	12	7	.632	1976, 1977, 1978, 1980, 1981, 1996, 1998, 1999, 2000, 2001, 2003, 2004, 2009, 2010, 2012, 2017, 2019, 2022, 2024
12	Boston Red Sox	6	6	.500	1975, 1986, 1988, 1990, 1999, 2003, 2004, 2007, 2008, 2013, 2018, 2021
11	Athletics	6	5	.545	1971, 1972, 1973, 1974, 1975, 1981, 1988, 1989, 1990, 1992, 2006
10	Baltimore Orioles	5	5	.500	1969, 1970, 1971, 1973, 1974, 1979, 1983, 1996, 1997, 2014
8	Kansas City Royals	4	4	.500	1976, 1977, 1978, 1980, 1984, 1985, 2014, 2015
7	Houston Astros	4	3	.571	2017, 2018, 2019, 2020, 2021, 2022, 2023
8	Toronto Blue Jays	3	5	.375	1985, 1989, 1991, 1992, 1993, 2015, 2016, 2025
7	Detroit Tigers	3	4	.429	1972, 1984, 1987, 2006, 2011, 2012, 2013
7	Cleveland Guardians	3	4	.429	1995, 1997, 1998, 2007, 2016, 2024, 2026
3	Texas Rangers	3	0	1.000	2010, 2011, 2023
3	Tampa Bay Rays	3	0	1.000	2008, 2020, 2026
5	Minnesota Twins	2	3	.400	1969, 1970, 1987, 1991, 2002
6	Los Angeles Angels	1	5	.167	1979, 1982, 1986, 2002, 2005, 2009
3	Chicago White Sox	1	2	.333	1983, 1993, 2005
1	Milwaukee Brewers	1	0	1.000	1982
4	Seattle Mariners	0	4	.000	1995, 2000, 2001, 2025

==== Recurring matchups ====
Count	Matchup	Record	Years
4	Kansas City Royals vs. New York Yankees	Yankees, 3–1	1976, 1977, 1978, 1980
3	Baltimore Orioles vs. Athletics	Athletics, 2–1	1971, 1973, 1974
3	Boston Red Sox vs. Athletics	Athletics, 2–1	1975, 1988, 1990
3	Boston Red Sox vs. New York Yankees	Yankees, 2–1	1999, 2003, 2004
3	Houston Astros vs. New York Yankees	Astros, 3–0	2017, 2019, 2022
2	Baltimore Orioles vs. Minnesota Twins	Orioles, 2–0	1969, 1970
2	Athletics vs. Toronto Blue Jays	Tied, 1–1	1989, 1992
2	New York Yankees vs. Seattle Mariners	Yankees, 2–0	2000, 2001
2	Detroit Tigers vs. Athletics	Tied, 1–1	1972, 2006
2	Kansas City Royals vs. Toronto Blue Jays	Royals, 2–0	1985, 2015
2	Boston Red Sox vs. Houston Astros	Tied, 1–1	2018, 2021
2	Cleveland Guardians vs. New York Yankees	Yankees, 2–0	1998, 2024

=== National League Championship Series ===
Key
†	Wild card
*	MVP did not play for winning team

Year	Winning team	Manager	Games	Losing team	Manager	Series MVP
1969	New York Mets	Gil Hodges	3–0	Atlanta Braves	Lum Harris	
1970	Cincinnati Reds	Sparky Anderson	3–0	Pittsburgh Pirates	Danny Murtaugh	
1971	Pittsburgh Pirates	Danny Murtaugh	3–1	San Francisco Giants	Charlie Fox	
1972	Cincinnati Reds	Sparky Anderson	3–2	Pittsburgh Pirates	Bill Virdon	
1973	New York Mets	Yogi Berra	3–2	Cincinnati Reds	Sparky Anderson	
1974	Los Angeles Dodgers	Walter Alston	3–1	Pittsburgh Pirates	Danny Murtaugh	
1975	Cincinnati Reds	Sparky Anderson	3–0	Pittsburgh Pirates	Danny Murtaugh	
1976	Cincinnati Reds	Sparky Anderson	3–0	Philadelphia Phillies	Danny Ozark	
1977	Los Angeles Dodgers	Tommy Lasorda	3–1	Philadelphia Phillies	Danny Ozark	Dusty Baker, Los Angeles
1978	Los Angeles Dodgers	Tommy Lasorda	3–1	Philadelphia Phillies	Danny Ozark	Steve Garvey, Los Angeles
1979	Pittsburgh Pirates	Chuck Tanner	3–0	Cincinnati Reds	John McNamara	Willie Stargell, Pittsburgh
1980	Philadelphia Phillies	Dallas Green	3–2	Houston Astros	Bill Virdon	Manny Trillo, Philadelphia
1981	Los Angeles Dodgers	Tommy Lasorda	3–2	Montreal Expos	Jim Fanning	Burt Hooton, Los Angeles
1982	St. Louis Cardinals	Whitey Herzog	3–0	Atlanta Braves	Joe Torre	Darrell Porter, St. Louis
1983	Philadelphia Phillies	Paul Owens	3–1	Los Angeles Dodgers	Tommy Lasorda	Gary Matthews, Philadelphia
1984	San Diego Padres	Dick Williams	3–2	Chicago Cubs	Jim Frey	Steve Garvey, San Diego
1985	St. Louis Cardinals	Whitey Herzog	4–2	Los Angeles Dodgers	Tommy Lasorda	Ozzie Smith, St. Louis
1986	New York Mets	Davey Johnson	4–2	Houston Astros	Hal Lanier	Mike Scott, Houston*
1987	St. Louis Cardinals	Whitey Herzog	4–3	San Francisco Giants	Roger Craig	Jeffrey Leonard, San Francisco*
1988	Los Angeles Dodgers	Tommy Lasorda	4–3	New York Mets	Davey Johnson	Orel Hershiser, Los Angeles
1989	San Francisco Giants	Roger Craig	4–1	Chicago Cubs	Don Zimmer	Will Clark, San Francisco
1990	Cincinnati Reds	Lou Piniella	4–2	Pittsburgh Pirates	Jim Leyland	Rob Dibble and Randy Myers, Cincinnati
1991	Atlanta Braves	Bobby Cox	4–3	Pittsburgh Pirates	Jim Leyland	Steve Avery, Atlanta
1992	Atlanta Braves	Bobby Cox	4–3	Pittsburgh Pirates	Jim Leyland	John Smoltz, Atlanta
1993	Philadelphia Phillies	Jim Fregosi	4–2	Atlanta Braves	Bobby Cox	Curt Schilling, Philadelphia
1994	No Series due to a players' strike.					
1995	Atlanta Braves	Bobby Cox	4–0	Cincinnati Reds	Davey Johnson	Mike Devereaux, Atlanta
1996	Atlanta Braves	Bobby Cox	4–3	St. Louis Cardinals	Tony La Russa	Javy López, Atlanta
1997	Florida Marlins^{†}	Jim Leyland	4–2	Atlanta Braves	Bobby Cox	Liván Hernández, Florida
1998	San Diego Padres	Bruce Bochy	4–2	Atlanta Braves	Bobby Cox	Sterling Hitchcock, San Diego
1999	Atlanta Braves	Bobby Cox	4–2	New York Mets^{†}	Bobby Valentine	Eddie Pérez, Atlanta
2000	New York Mets^{†}	Bobby Valentine	4–1	St. Louis Cardinals	Tony La Russa	Mike Hampton, New York
2001	Arizona Diamondbacks	Bob Brenly	4–1	Atlanta Braves	Bobby Cox	Craig Counsell, Arizona
2002	San Francisco Giants^{†}	Dusty Baker	4–1	St. Louis Cardinals	Tony La Russa	Benito Santiago, San Francisco
2003	Florida Marlins^{†}	Jack McKeon	4–3	Chicago Cubs	Dusty Baker	Iván Rodríguez, Florida
2004	St. Louis Cardinals	Tony La Russa	4–3	Houston Astros^{†}	Phil Garner	Albert Pujols, St. Louis
2005	Houston Astros^{†}	Phil Garner	4–2	St. Louis Cardinals	Tony La Russa	Roy Oswalt, Houston
2006	St. Louis Cardinals	Tony La Russa	4–3	New York Mets	Willie Randolph	Jeff Suppan, St. Louis
2007	Colorado Rockies^{†}	Clint Hurdle	4–0	Arizona Diamondbacks	Bob Melvin	Matt Holliday, Colorado
2008	Philadelphia Phillies	Charlie Manuel	4–1	Los Angeles Dodgers	Joe Torre	Cole Hamels, Philadelphia
2009	Philadelphia Phillies	Charlie Manuel	4–1	Los Angeles Dodgers	Joe Torre	Ryan Howard, Philadelphia
2010	San Francisco Giants	Bruce Bochy	4–2	Philadelphia Phillies	Charlie Manuel	Cody Ross, San Francisco
2011	St. Louis Cardinals^{†}	Tony La Russa	4–2	Milwaukee Brewers	Ron Roenicke	David Freese, St. Louis
2012	San Francisco Giants	Bruce Bochy	4–3	St. Louis Cardinals^{†}	Mike Matheny	Marco Scutaro, San Francisco
2013	St. Louis Cardinals	Mike Matheny	4–2	Los Angeles Dodgers	Don Mattingly	Michael Wacha, St. Louis
2014	San Francisco Giants^{†}	Bruce Bochy	4–1	St. Louis Cardinals	Mike Matheny	Madison Bumgarner, San Francisco
2015	New York Mets	Terry Collins	4–0	Chicago Cubs^{†}	Joe Maddon	Daniel Murphy, New York
2016	Chicago Cubs	Joe Maddon	4–2	Los Angeles Dodgers	Dave Roberts	Javier Báez and Jon Lester, Chicago
2017	Los Angeles Dodgers	Dave Roberts	4–1	Chicago Cubs	Joe Maddon	Chris Taylor and Justin Turner, Los Angeles
2018	Los Angeles Dodgers	Dave Roberts	4–3	Milwaukee Brewers	Craig Counsell	Cody Bellinger, Los Angeles
2019	Washington Nationals^{†}	Dave Martinez	4–0	St. Louis Cardinals	Mike Shildt	Howie Kendrick, Washington
2020	Los Angeles Dodgers	Dave Roberts	4–3	Atlanta Braves	Brian Snitker	Corey Seager, Los Angeles
2021	Atlanta Braves	Brian Snitker	4–2	Los Angeles Dodgers^{†}	Dave Roberts	Eddie Rosario, Atlanta
2022	Philadelphia Phillies^{†}	Rob Thomson	4–1	San Diego Padres^{†}	Bob Melvin	Bryce Harper, Philadelphia
2023	Arizona Diamondbacks^{†}	Torey Lovullo	4–3	Philadelphia Phillies^{†}	Rob Thomson	Ketel Marte, Arizona
2024	Los Angeles Dodgers	Dave Roberts	4–2	New York Mets^{†}	Carlos Mendoza	Tommy Edman, Los Angeles
2025	Los Angeles Dodgers	Dave Roberts	4–0	Milwaukee Brewers	Pat Murphy	Shohei Ohtani, Los Angeles
2026	Milwaukee Brewers	Pat Murphy	4–0	Los Angeles Dodgers	Dave Roberts	Jake Bauers, Milwaukee

==== Appearances by team ====
Apps	Team	Wins	Losses	Win %	Most recent win	Most recent appearance	Games won	Games lost	Game win %
18	Los Angeles Dodgers	10	8	.556	2025	2026	47	48	.495
14	St. Louis Cardinals	7	7	.500	2013	2019	38	43	.469
13	Atlanta Braves	6	7	.462	2021	2021	34	39	.466
11	Philadelphia Phillies	6	5	.545	2022	2023	29	25	.537
9	Pittsburgh Pirates	2	7	.222	1979	1992	17	25	.405
8	Cincinnati Reds	5	3	.625	1990	1995	18	14	.563
9	New York Mets	5	4	.556	2015	2024	28	21	.571
7	San Francisco Giants	5	2	.714	2014	2014	24	15	.615
6	Chicago Cubs	1	5	.167	2016	2017	11	21	.344
4	Houston Astros (Note: The Houston Astros moved to the American League in 2013.)	1	3	.250	2005	2005	11	13	.458
4	Milwaukee Brewers	1	3	.250	2026	2026	9	12	.429
3	Arizona Diamondbacks	2	1	.667	2023	2023	8	8	.500
3	San Diego Padres	2	1	.667	1998	2022	8	8	.500
2	Miami Marlins	2	0	1.000	2003	2003	8	5	.615
2	Washington Nationals	1	1	.500	2019	2019	6	3	.667
1	Colorado Rockies	1	0	1.000	2007	2007	4	0	1.000

==== Years of appearance ====
In the sortable table below, teams are ordered first by number of wins, then by number of appearances, and finally by year of first appearance. In the "Season(s)" column, bold years indicate winning appearances.

Apps	Team	Wins	Losses	Win %	Season(s)
18	Los Angeles Dodgers	10	8	.556	1974, 1977, 1978, 1981, 1983, 1985, 1988, 2008, 2009, 2013, 2016, 2017, 2018, 2020, 2021, 2024, 2025, 2026
14	St. Louis Cardinals	7	7	.500	1982, 1985, 1987, 1996, 2000, 2002, 2004, 2005, 2006, 2011, 2012, 2013, 2014, 2019
13	Atlanta Braves	6	7	.462	1969, 1982, 1991, 1992, 1993, 1995, 1996, 1997, 1998, 1999, 2001, 2020, 2021
11	Philadelphia Phillies	6	5	.545	1976, 1977, 1978, 1980, 1983, 1993, 2008, 2009, 2010, 2022, 2023
9	New York Mets	5	4	.556	1969, 1973, 1986, 1988, 1999, 2000, 2006, 2015, 2024
8	Cincinnati Reds	5	3	.625	1970, 1972, 1973, 1975, 1976, 1979, 1990, 1995
7	San Francisco Giants	5	2	.714	1971, 1987, 1989, 2002, 2010, 2012, 2014
9	Pittsburgh Pirates	2	7	.222	1970, 1971, 1972, 1974, 1975, 1979, 1990, 1991, 1992
3	San Diego Padres	2	1	.667	1984, 1998, 2022
3	Arizona Diamondbacks	2	1	.667	2001, 2007, 2023
2	Miami Marlins	2	0	1.000	1997, 2003
6	Chicago Cubs	1	5	.167	1984, 1989, 2003, 2015, 2016, 2017
4	Houston Astros	1	3	.250	1980, 1986, 2004, 2005
4	Milwaukee Brewers	1	3	.250	2011, 2018, 2025, 2026
2	Washington Nationals	1	1	.500	1981, 2019
1	Colorado Rockies	1	0	1.000	2007

==== Frequent matchups ====
Count	Matchup	Record	Years
5	Cincinnati Reds vs. Pittsburgh Pirates	Reds, 4–1	1970, 1972, 1975, 1979, 1990
5	Los Angeles Dodgers vs. Philadelphia Phillies	Phillies, 3–2	1977, 1978, 1983, 2008, 2009
4	San Francisco Giants vs. St. Louis Cardinals	Giants, 3–1	1987, 2002, 2012, 2014
3	Los Angeles Dodgers vs. Milwaukee Brewers	Dodgers, 2–1	2018, 2025, 2026
2	Atlanta Braves vs. Pittsburgh Pirates	Braves, 2–0	1991, 1992
2	Atlanta Braves vs. St. Louis Cardinals	Tied, 1–1	1982, 1996
2	Atlanta Braves vs. New York Mets	Tied, 1–1	1969, 1999
2	Houston Astros vs. St. Louis Cardinals	Tied, 1–1	2004, 2005
2	New York Mets vs. St. Louis Cardinals	Tied, 1–1	2000, 2006
2	Los Angeles Dodgers vs. St. Louis Cardinals	Cardinals, 2–0	1985, 2013
2	Chicago Cubs vs. Los Angeles Dodgers	Tied, 1–1	2016, 2017
2	Atlanta Braves vs. Los Angeles Dodgers	Tied, 1–1	2020, 2021
2	Los Angeles Dodgers vs. New York Mets	Dodgers, 2–0	1988, 2024

== See also ==
- MLB postseason
- Wild Card Series
- Division Series
