= List of Los Angeles Angels seasons =

Los Angeles Angels
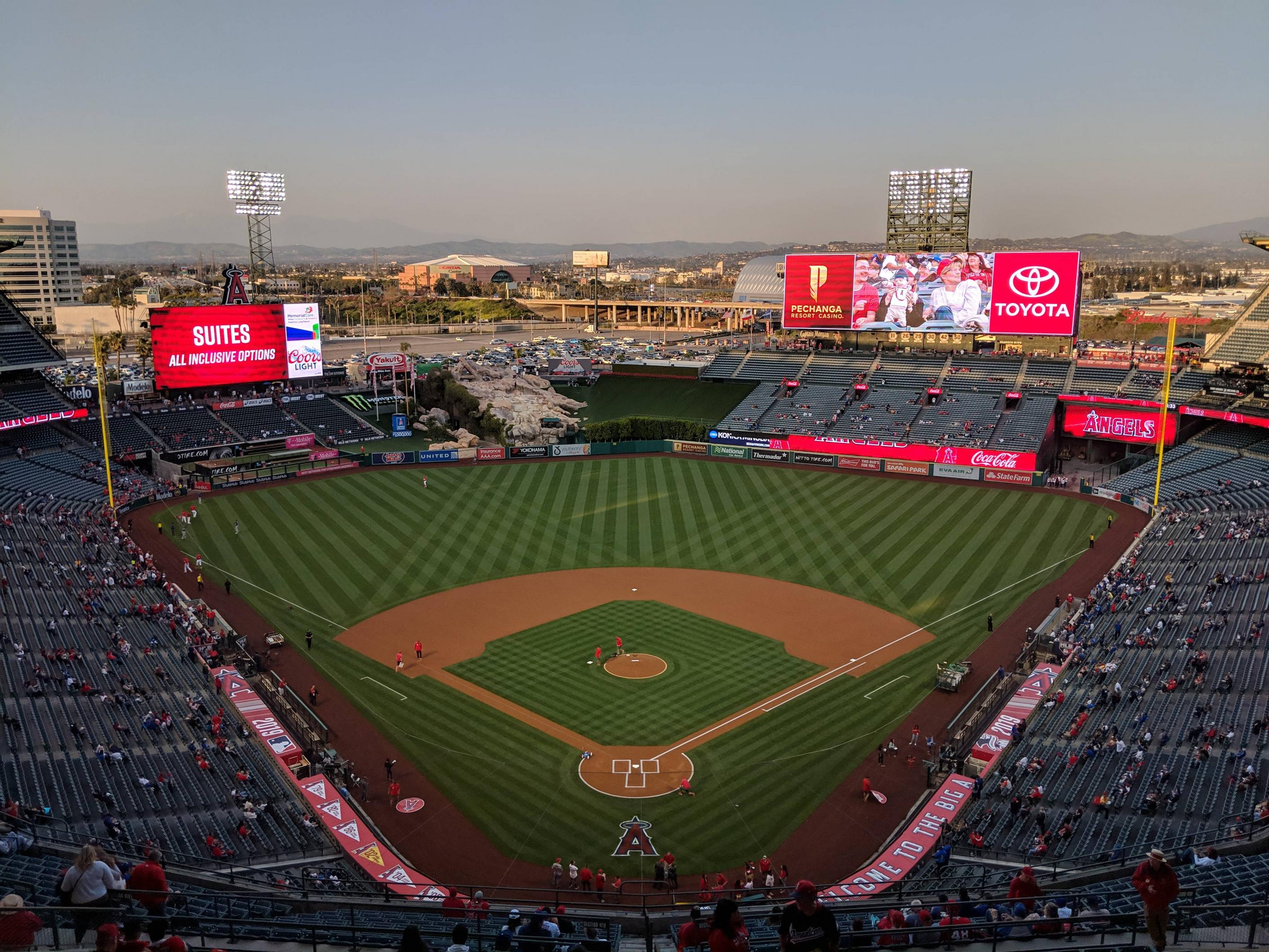
- Angel Stadium, where the Angels have played since 1966.

Franchise History
- Established: April 11, 1961; 65 years ago
- Major League: Major League Baseball
- Current League / Division: American League / West
- Seasons Played: 66 (as of 2026 season)

Accomplishments
- World Series Titles: 1
- League Pennants: 1 (AL)
- Division Titles: 9

This is a list of seasons completed by the Los Angeles Angels, also known as the California Angels from 1965 to 1996, the Anaheim Angels from 1997 to 2004 and the Los Angeles Angels of Anaheim from 2005 to 2015. They are a professional baseball franchise based in Anaheim, California. They play in the Western Division of Major League Baseball's (MLB) American League.

Established in 1961, the Angels played their first four seasons in Los Angeles under two stadiums: Wrigley Field, the venue previously used by the Pacific Coast League (PCL) Los Angeles Angels team that the Angels named themselves after, and Dodger Stadium, which the Angels referred to as "Chavez Ravine Stadium". They moved to the city of Anaheim in 1966 shortly after changing their name to California Angels to refer to the entire state of California while playing in Anaheim Stadium, where they still play today but now called Angel Stadium. The Angels were created in 1960 as part of a boom in baseball coming to the state of California. They were the third MLB team to play in California but the first to actually originate in the state. Gene Autry was the first owner of the franchise, having bought the rights in 1960. The inaugural season for the team resulted in 70 wins and 91 losses, which stands as the best winning percentage for an expansion MLB team. They would contend in parts of the 1960s, finishing 3rd twice in the decade but never finishing closer than ten games out of a pennant. The 1970s brought a number of miserable seasons, which included seven straight losing seasons from 1971 to 1977. However, the Angels had a few shining spots in that era, which included Nolan Ryan (who threw four no-hitters with the team). In 1979, the Angels won the AL West and reached the postseason for the first time ever. They lost to the Baltimore Orioles in four games, while Ryan departed Anaheim in free agency in the winter. The Angels won the AL West twice in the next decade but fell short of the World Series by one game each time.

In 1997, The Walt Disney Company bought ownership in the team. As such, the team name was changed to reflect the actual city the team played in while renovations were done for the stadium, which took corporate branding that referred to it as "Edison International Field of Anaheim", which stayed that way until 2003. Losing a one-game tiebreaker for the AL West in 1995 was the closest the Angels were to reaching the postseason in the 1990s. However, the Angels steadily grew talent in the next few years that soon made them a relative contender, done under manager Mike Scioscia. In 2002, the Angels went from losing 87 games to winning 99 to set a franchise record for wins at the time while making the postseason for the first time in sixteen years. They would roll to a World Series victory during the postseason, which included winning the final two games while facing elimination. Arte Moreno bought the team from Disney after the season ended. In the next twelve seasons, the Angels would reach the postseason six times. Despite seeing two players awarded the American League's Most Valuable Player award four times (2016, 2019, 2021, 2023) over the next couple of years, the Angels, all under Moreno's leadership as owner, have failed to reach the postseason since 2014 and have had eleven straight losing seasons from 2016 to 2026, the greatest stretch of losing seasons in franchise history and currently the longest drought of reaching the postseason among all teams in the league.

The Angels in total have completed 66 seasons in Major League Baseball, qualifying for the postseason ten times with one World Series championship (2002).

== Table key ==
ALCS	American League Championship Series
ALDS	American League Division Series
CYA	Cy Young Award
Finish	Final position in league or division
GB	"Games Back" from first-place team^{[a]}
Losses	Number of regular season losses
MOY	Manager of the Year
MVP	Most Valuable Player
ROY	American League Rookie of the Year
Season	Each year is linked to an article about that particular MLB season
Team	Each year is linked to an article about that particular Angels season
Wins	Number of regular season wins

== Year by year ==
World Series champions †	AL champions^{[b]} *	Division champions (1969–present) ^	Wild card berth (1994–present) ¤

MLB season	Team season	Level	League	Division	Finish	Wins	Losses	Win%	GB^{[c]}	Postseason	Awards
Los Angeles Angels
1961	1961	MLB	AL		8th	70	91	.435	38½		
1962	1962	MLB	AL		3rd	86	76	.531	10		
1963	1963	MLB	AL		9th	70	91	.435	34		
1964	1964	MLB	AL		5th	82	80	.494	17		Dean Chance (CYA)
California Angels
1965	1965	MLB	AL		7th	75	87	.463	27		
1966	1966	MLB	AL		6th	80	82	.494	18		
1967	1967	MLB	AL		5th	84	77	.522	7½		
1968	1968	MLB	AL		8th	67	95	.414	36		
1969	1969	MLB	AL	West^{[d]}	3rd	71	91	.438	26		
1970	1970	MLB	AL	West	3rd	86	76	.531	12		
1971	1971	MLB	AL	West	4th	76	86	.469	25½		
1972^{[e]}	1972	MLB	AL	West	5th	75	80	.484	18		
1973	1973	MLB	AL	West	4th	79	83	.488	15		
1974	1974	MLB	AL	West	6th	68	94	.420	22		
1975	1975	MLB	AL	West	6th	72	89	.447	25½		
1976	1976	MLB	AL	West	4th	76	86	.469	14		
1977	1977	MLB	AL	West	5th	74	88	.457	28		
1978	1978	MLB	AL	West	2nd	87	75	.537	5		
1979	1979	MLB	AL	West ^	1st	88	74	.543		Lost ALCS (Orioles) 3–1	Don Baylor (MVP)
1980	1980	MLB	AL	West	6th	65	95	.406	31		
1981^{[f]}	1981	MLB	AL	West	4th	31	29	.517			
1981^{[f]}	1981	MLB	AL	West	7th	20	30	.400			
1982	1982	MLB	AL	West ^	1st	93	69	.574		Lost ALCS (Brewers) 3–2	
1983	1983	MLB	AL	West	5th	70	92	.432	29		
1984	1984	MLB	AL	West	2nd	81	81	.500	3		
1985	1985	MLB	AL	West	2nd	90	72	.556	1		
1986	1986	MLB	AL	West ^	1st	92	70	.568		Lost ALCS (Red Sox) 4–3	
1987	1987	MLB	AL	West	6th	75	87	.463	10		
1988	1988	MLB	AL	West	4th	75	87	.463	29		
1989	1989	MLB	AL	West	3rd	91	71	.562	8		
1990	1990	MLB	AL	West	4th	80	82	.494	23		
1991	1991	MLB	AL	West	7th	81	81	.500	14		
1992	1992	MLB	AL	West	5th	72	90	.444	24		
1993	1993	MLB	AL	West	5th	71	91	.438	23		Tim Salmon (ROY)
1994^{[g]}	1994	MLB	AL	West	4th	47	68	.409	5½	Playoffs canceled	
1995^{[h]}	1995	MLB	AL	West	2nd	78	67	.538	1		
1996	1996	MLB	AL	West	4th	70	91	.435	19½		
Anaheim Angels
1997	1997	MLB	AL	West	2nd	84	78	.519	6		
1998	1998	MLB	AL	West	2nd	85	77	.525	3		
1999	1999	MLB	AL	West	4th	70	92	.432	25		
2000	2000	MLB	AL	West	3rd	82	80	.506	9½		
2001	2001	MLB	AL	West	3rd	75	87	.463	41		
2002	2002	MLB †	AL *	West	2nd ¤	99	63	.611	4	Won ALDS (Yankees) 3–1; Won ALCS (Twins) 4–1; Won World Series (Giants) 4–3 †	Mike Scioscia (MOY)
2003	2003	MLB	AL	West	3rd	77	85	.475	19		
2004	2004	MLB	AL	West ^	1st	92	70	.568		Lost ALDS (Red Sox) 3–0	Vladimir Guerrero (MVP)
Los Angeles Angels
2005	2005	MLB	AL	West ^	1st	95	67	.586		Won ALDS (Yankees) 3–2; Lost ALCS (White Sox) 4–1	Bartolo Colón (CYA)
2006	2006	MLB	AL	West	2nd	89	73	.549	4		
2007	2007	MLB	AL	West ^	1st	94	68	.580		Lost ALDS (Red Sox) 3–0	
2008	2008	MLB	AL	West ^	1st	100	62	.617		Lost ALDS (Red Sox) 3–1	
2009	2009	MLB	AL	West ^	1st	97	65	.599		Won ALDS (Red Sox) 3–0; Lost ALCS (Yankees) 4–2	Mike Scioscia (MOY)
2010	2010	MLB	AL	West	3rd	80	82	.494	10		
2011	2011	MLB	AL	West	2nd	86	76	.531	10		
2012	2012	MLB	AL	West	3rd	89	73	.549	5		Mike Trout (ROY)
2013	2013	MLB	AL	West	3rd	78	84	.481	18		
2014	2014	MLB	AL	West ^	1st	98	64	.605		Lost ALDS (Royals) 3–0	Mike Trout (MVP)
2015	2015	MLB	AL	West	3rd	85	77	.525	3		
2016	2016	MLB	AL	West	4th	74	88	.457	21		Mike Trout (MVP)
2017	2017	MLB	AL	West	2nd	80	82	.494	21		
2018	2018	MLB	AL	West	4th	80	82	.494	23		Shohei Ohtani (ROY)
2019	2019	MLB	AL	West	4th	72	90	.444	35		Mike Trout (MVP)
2020*	2020	MLB	AL	West	3rd	26	34	.433	10		
2021	2021	MLB	AL	West	4th	77	85	.475	18		Shohei Ohtani (MVP)
2022	2022	MLB	AL	West	3rd	73	89	.451	33		
2023	2023	MLB	AL	West	4th	73	89	.451	17		Shohei Ohtani (MVP)
2024	2024	MLB	AL	West	5th	63	99	.389	25½		
2025	2025	MLB	AL	West	5th	72	90	.444	18		
2026	2026	MLB	AL	West	5th	62	100	.383	19		
Totals						Wins	Losses	Win%			
Totals						5,155	5,305	.493	All-time regular season record (1961–2026)		
Totals						27	37	.422	All-time postseason record		
Totals						5,182	5,342	.492	All-time regular and postseason record		

== Record by decade ==
The following table describes the Angels' MLB win–loss record by decade.

Decade	Wins	Losses	Pct
1960s	685	770	.471
1970s	781	831	.484
1980s	783	783	.500
1990s	738	817	.475
2000s	900	720	.556
2010s	822	798	.507
2020s	446	586	.432
All-time	5,155	5,305	.493

These statistics are from Baseball Reference's Los Angeles Angels Team History & Encyclopedia.

== Postseason appearances ==
Year	Wild Card Game/Series	LDS		LCS		World Series	
1979	None (Won AL West)			Baltimore Orioles	L (1–3)		
1982	None (Won AL West)			Milwaukee Brewers	L (2–3)		
1986	None (Won AL West)			Boston Red Sox	L (3–4)		
2002	None (Won AL Wild Card)	New York Yankees	W (3–1)	Minnesota Twins	W (4–1)	San Francisco Giants	W (4–3)
2004	None (Won AL West)	Boston Red Sox	L (0–3)				
2005	None (Won AL West)	New York Yankees	W (3–2)	Chicago White Sox	L (1–4)		
2007	None (Won AL West)	Boston Red Sox	L (0–3)				
2008	None (Won AL West)	Boston Red Sox	L (1–3)				
2009	None (Won AL West)	Boston Red Sox	W (3–0)	New York Yankees	L (2–4)		
2014	None (Won AL West)	Kansas City Royals	L (0–3)				

== Postseason record by year ==
The Angels have made the postseason ten times in their history with their first being in 1979 and the most recent being in 2014.

Postseason record by year
Year	Finish	Round	Opponent	Result		
1979	American League West Champions	ALCS	Baltimore Orioles	Lost	1	3
1982	American League West Champions	ALCS	Milwaukee Brewers	Lost	2	3
1986	American League West Champions	ALCS	Boston Red Sox	Lost	3	4
2002	World Series Champions	ALDS	New York Yankees	Won	3	1
2002	World Series Champions	ALCS	Minnesota Twins	Won	4	1
2002	World Series Champions	World Series	San Francisco Giants	Won	4	3
2004	American League West Champions	ALDS	Boston Red Sox	Lost	0	3
2005	American League West Champions	ALDS	New York Yankees	Won	3	2
2005	American League West Champions	ALCS	Chicago White Sox	Lost	1	4
2007	American League West Champions	ALDS	Boston Red Sox	Lost	0	3
2008	American League West Champions	ALDS	Boston Red Sox	Lost	1	3
2009	American League West Champions	ALDS	Boston Red Sox	Won	3	0
2009	American League West Champions	ALCS	New York Yankees	Lost	2	4
2014	American League West Champions	ALDS	Kansas City Royals	Lost	0	3
10	Totals			5–9	27	37

== Notes ==
- ^{a} This is determined by calculating the difference in wins plus the difference in losses divided by two.
- ^{b} For lists of all American League pennant winners, see List of American League pennant winners and League Championship Series.
- ^{c} Half-game increments are possible because games can be cancelled due to rain. If a postponed game is the last of the season between two teams in one of their stadiums, it may not be made up if it does not affect the playoff race.
- ^{d} In 1969, the American League split into East and West divisions.
- ^{e} The 1972 Major League Baseball strike forced the cancellation of the Angels' first seven games of the season.
- ^{f} The 1981 Major League Baseball strike caused the season to be split into two halves.
- ^{g} The 1994–95 Major League Baseball strike, which started on August 12, led to the cancellation of the playoffs and World Series. As a result of the abbreviated season, MLB did not officially award division championships.
- ^{h} The 1994 MLB strike lasted until April 2, 1995, causing the shortening of the 1995 season to 144 games.
