= 1982 American League Championship Series =

1982 Major League Baseball playoff series

Team (Wins)	Managers	Season
Milwaukee Brewers (3)	Harvey Kuenn	95–67, .586, GA: 1
California Angels (2)	Gene Mauch	93–69, .574, GA: 3
- Dates: October 5–10
- MVP: Fred Lynn (California)
- Umpires: Larry Barnett; Bill Kunkel; Rich Garcia; Steve Palermo; Don Denkinger (crew chief); Al Clark

Broadcast
- Television: ABC; KTLA (CAL); WVTV (MIL)
- TV announcers: ABC: Keith Jackson, Earl Weaver, and Jim Palmer; KTLA: Ron Fairly, Bob Starr and Joe Buttitta; WVTV: Mike Hegan and Steve Shannon
- Radio: CBS; KMPC (CAL); WISN (MIL)
- Radio announcers: CBS: Ernie Harwell and Denny Matthews; KMPC: Ron Fairly, Bob Starr and Joe Buttitta; WISN: Bob Uecker and Dwayne Mosely

The 1982 American League Championship Series was a best-of-five playoff semifinal postseason series in Major League Baseball’s 1982 postseason between the Milwaukee Brewers and the California Angels for the American League (AL) pennant and the right to play in the 1982 World Series. The 14th ALCS in league history, it began on October 5 and concluded on October 10. The Brewers overcame a two-games-to-none series deficit to defeat the Angels in five games, advancing to the World Series for the first time in franchise history.

This was the first ALCS not to feature either the Oakland Athletics, Baltimore Orioles, or New York Yankees. This ALCS was marked by a dramatic comeback by the Brewers, who lost the first two games of the series and were trailing late in the final game, and the series was the first League Championship Series where the home team won every game.

The series was noteworthy as being the first to feature a matchup between two "expansion" teams (i.e., franchises not included among the 16 operating in the major leagues for most of the first half of the 20th century), for featuring two teams that had never before won a pennant, and for being the first time a team came from a 2–0 deficit to win the series.

This was the only time the Brewers won a league pennant until 2026.

== Background ==
The American League East race would come down to a winner-take-all game against the Milwaukee Brewers and Baltimore Orioles. A game where both teams were tied for 1st on the last game of the regular season had happened only once before in baseball history — the 1949 American League race between the Boston Red Sox and New York Yankees. The 1982 Game 162 were to be pitched by future Hall of Famers, Don Sutton and the Orioles’ Jim Palmer. Adding more drama was that it was Baltimore's legendary manager Earl Weaver's last game, who already announced this would be his last season (Weaver would later come out of retirement to manage the Orioles from 1985 to 1986). The race was also significant because the Brewers and Orioles had high expectations coming into the season, but both teams got off to dreadful starts and were given up on midway through the season. To get to this point, Baltimore, who were eight games back of Milwaukee and Boston in mid-August, won the first three games of the four-game series. Baltimore fans even brought brooms to Memorial Stadium, anticipating the final scene of one the greatest comebacks in MLB history.

In the first inning, Robin Yount, the AL MVP for the season in 1982, took a solo home run the other way against Jim Palmer. Yount homered to center in the third, and in the eighth inning he tripled and scored. The Brewers clung to a 5–1 lead with Sutton pitching well.

Sutton then walked two batters and gave up a hit in the bottom of the eighth, to cut the lead to 5–2. Joe Nolan came up to pinch hit with two outs and runners on the corners. Nolan laced a low line drive into the left field corner. It looked certain to score two more runs. Instead, left fielder Ben Oglivie went sliding feet first and made the catch, as his legs rolled up the wall that was on the right on top of the foul line. The rally was turned back around, and the Brewers scored five times in the top of the ninth, giving the Brewers a 10–2 win and a hard-fought AL East title.

Awaiting the Brewers in the ALCS was the California Angels, who were built on Gene Autry's plan to acquire veterans with winning pedigrees. They had traded for Bob Boone, a catcher from the 1980 champion Philadelphia Phillies; Tim Foli, a shortstop on the World Series winning 1979 Pirates; Doug DeCinces, a longtime Orioles' third baseman who won a pennant in 1979; All-Star left fielder Fred Lynn came over in a trade in 1981, who nearly won a World Series in 1975 with the Red Sox; and most importantly, big ticket free-agent signee Reggie Jackson, a 5x World Champion and 2x World Series MVP winner. Coincidentally, all the recent acquisitions but Jackson grew up in Southern California.

These new additions joined an everyday lineup. Rod Carew was now 36-years-old at first base, and hit .319 in 1982; Brian Downing hit 28 home runs, playing left field and batting leadoff. Bobby Grich, the second baseman, hit a .261/.371/.449; and Don Baylor, the DH, hit 24 home runs and drove in 98 runs. Grich and Baylor were also former Orioles, who Autry had signed through free agency in 1977.

While not as close as the AL East race, the AL West would come down to the 2nd to last day of the season, with the Angels holding off the Kansas City Royals.

== Summary ==
=== Milwaukee Brewers vs. California Angels ===
Milwaukee won the series, 3–2.

Game	Date	Score	Location	Time	Attendance
1	October 5	Milwaukee Brewers – 3, California Angels – 8	Anaheim Stadium	2:31	64,406
2	October 6	Milwaukee Brewers – 2, California Angels – 4	Anaheim Stadium	2:06	64,179
3	October 8	California Angels – 3, Milwaukee Brewers – 5	County Stadium	2:31	50,135
4	October 9	California Angels – 5, Milwaukee Brewers – 9	County Stadium	3:10	51,003
5	October 10	California Angels – 3, Milwaukee Brewers – 4	County Stadium	3:01	54,968

== Game summaries ==
=== Game 1 ===
October 5, 1982 5:25 pm (PDT) at Anaheim Stadium in Anaheim, California
Team	1	2	3	4	5	6	7	8	9	R	H	E
Milwaukee	0	2	1	0	0	0	0	0	0	3	7	2
California	1	0	4	2	1	0	0	0	X	8	10	0
WP: Tommy John (1–0) LP: Mike Caldwell (0–1); Home runs: MIL: Gorman Thomas (1); CAL: Fred Lynn (1)

The Angels jumped to a 1–0 lead in the first when Brian Downing scored an unearned run on a sacrifice fly by Don Baylor. Milwaukee came back to take a 3–1 lead with a two-run homer by Gorman Thomas in the second and a run scored by Paul Molitor on a groundout in the third. But the Angels took back the lead for good in their half of the third with a four-run rally highlighted by Baylor's two-run triple. Baylor capped off a five-RBI game with a two-run single in the fourth, and the Angels got another run in the fifth when eventual series MVP Fred Lynn homered. California starter Tommy John, who lent his name to the famous surgical procedure, settled down after the third and gave the Brewers little over the final six innings on his way to a complete-game victory.

=== Game 2 ===
October 6, 1982 5:15 pm (PDT) at Anaheim Stadium in Anaheim, California
Team	1	2	3	4	5	6	7	8	9	R	H	E
Milwaukee	0	0	0	0	2	0	0	0	0	2	5	0
California	0	2	1	1	0	0	0	0	X	4	6	0
WP: Bruce Kison (1–0) LP: Pete Vuckovich (0–1); Home runs: MIL: Paul Molitor (1); CAL: Reggie Jackson (1)

California got off to a 4–0 lead in Game 2 and never looked back. The Angels got two in the second on an RBI single from Tim Foli and a squeeze bunt by Bob Boone. California's Reggie Jackson homered in the third to make it 3–0, and Boone plated the Angels' fourth run with a sacrifice fly in the fourth. The Brewers made a game of it in the fifth on Paul Molitor's two-run inside-the-park homer, but could get no closer the rest of the way against the strong pitching of Bruce Kison. Those complete-game efforts helped produce the snappy 2:06 time of game. California was now up 2–0 in the series and needed only one more win for the franchise's first trip to the World Series.

=== Game 3 ===
October 8, 1982 2:15 p.m. (CDT) at County Stadium in Milwaukee, Wisconsin
Team	1	2	3	4	5	6	7	8	9	R	H	E
California	0	0	0	0	0	0	0	3	0	3	8	0
Milwaukee	0	0	0	3	0	0	2	0	X	5	6	0
WP: Don Sutton (1–0) LP: Geoff Zahn (0–1) Sv: Pete Ladd (1); Home runs: CAL: Bob Boone (1); MIL: Paul Molitor (2)

The series moved to Milwaukee and produced the Brewers' first win. Milwaukee opened the scoring in the fourth with three runs on an RBI double by Cecil Cooper, who would eventually get the series-winning hit, and sacrifice flies by Gorman Thomas and Don Money. Paul Molitor got two more runs for Milwaukee with a seventh-inning homer, this one over the fence. Brewers starter Don Sutton pitched strongly for the first seven innings but tired in the eighth, yielding three runs on a Bob Boone homer and doubles by Fred Lynn and Don Baylor. Pete Ladd came out of the Milwaukee bullpen to get the final four outs for the save.

=== Game 4 ===
October 9, 1982 12 Noon (CDT) at County Stadium in Milwaukee, Wisconsin
Team	1	2	3	4	5	6	7	8	9	R	H	E
California	0	0	0	0	0	1	0	4	0	5	5	3
Milwaukee	0	3	0	3	0	1	0	2	X	9	9	2
WP: Moose Haas (1–0) LP: Tommy John (1–1) Sv: Jim Slaton (1); Home runs: CAL: Don Baylor (1); MIL: Mark Brouhard (1)

The Brewers again staved off elimination and evened the series in a rather sloppy but high-scoring Game 4. The teams combined for five errors to allow three unearned runs. Milwaukee built a 6–0 lead with three-run rallies in the second and fourth. The Brewers got a lot of help from two California errors and three wild pitches by Angels starter Tommy John, who took the loss. The teams traded runs in the sixth: Fred Lynn doubled home Reggie Jackson for the Angels, and Jim Gantner singled home Mark Brouhard for the Brewers. Brouhard, who only appeared in 40 regular season games, was subbing for Ben Oglivie. Brouhard contributed 3 hits, 4 runs and 3 RBI's in this, the only postseason appearance of his career. California rallied for four runs in the eighth on a grand slam by Don Baylor to cut Milwaukee's lead to 7–5. But the Brewers bounced back with a two-run homer by Brouhard in the bottom of the inning to put the game away and level the series 2–2.

=== Game 5 ===
October 10, 1982 3:20 p.m. (CDT) at County Stadium in Milwaukee, Wisconsin
Team	1	2	3	4	5	6	7	8	9	R	H	E
California	1	0	1	1	0	0	0	0	0	3	11	1
Milwaukee	1	0	0	1	0	0	2	0	X	4	6	4
WP: Bob McClure (1–0) LP: Luis Sánchez (0–1) Sv: Pete Ladd (2); Home runs: CAL: None; MIL: Ben Oglivie (1)

Game 5 proved to be the most dramatic of the series. The Angels got a quick 1–0 lead in the first on a double by Brian Downing and a single by Fred Lynn. But Milwaukee tied the game in the bottom of the inning when Paul Molitor doubled and eventually came home on a sacrifice fly by Ted Simmons. The Angels made it 2–1 in the third on an RBI single from Fred Lynn, and stretched the lead to 3–1 in the fourth on a run-scoring single from Bob Boone. Milwaukee cut the lead to 3–2 in the bottom of the fourth on Ben Oglivie's homer. In the 5th inning, the Angels nearly threatened again, until Reggie Jackson was thrown out trying to reach third on a Fred Lynn single. The score remained unchanged until the bottom of the seventh, when disaster struck the Angels. Milwaukee loaded the bases on two singles and a walk. Cecil Cooper then cracked the series-winning hit, a two-run single that put the Brewers ahead 4–3. The Milwaukee bullpen kept the Angels off the board in the final two innings, helped by a spectacular catch by reserve outfielder Marshall Edwards, robbing Don Baylor of extra bases. The Angels threatened again in the 9th with a runner on second, and Rod Carew at the plate. Pete Ladd got Carew to ground out to Robin Yount, and the Brewers took home the franchise's first and only American League pennant and its first World Series appearance.

== Composite box ==
1982 ALCS (3–2): Milwaukee Brewers over California Angels

Team	1	2	3	4	5	6	7	8	9	R	H	E
Milwaukee Brewers	1	5	1	7	2	1	4	2	0	23	33	8
California Angels	2	2	6	4	1	1	0	7	0	23	40	4
Total attendance: 284,691 Average attendance: 56,938

== Aftermath ==
1982 would not be the closest the Angels came to winning a pennant in the 1980s. In 1986, the Angels were up 3–1 in the AL Championship Series, leading 5–2 in ninth inning, reaching within one strike of their first-ever AL pennant. Dave Henderson of the opposing Red Sox caught hold of a Donnie Moore forkball and launched a home run into the left field seats to give the Red Sox a momentary, 6–5 lead on the top of the ninth inning in a game the Red Sox would go on to win the game 7–6 in eleven innings; the Angels went down lifelessly in the following two games as the Red Sox completed the 3–1 series comeback. It would not be until 2002 when the Angels won their first pennant, on their way to their first World Series in franchise history.

This was the Milwaukee Brewers first and only American League pennant, as they moved to the National League in 1998. The Brewers would not win a pennant in the National League until 2026.
