= Pete Ladd =

American baseball player (1956–2023)

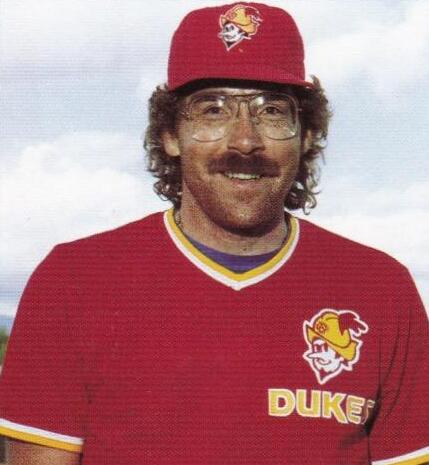
- Ladd with the Albuquerque Dukes c. 1987
- Pitcher
- Born: July 17, 1956; Portland, Maine, U.S.
- Died: October 20, 2023 (aged 67)
- Batted: Right Threw: Right

MLB debut
- August 17, 1979, for the Houston Astros

Last MLB appearance
- October 3, 1986, for the Seattle Mariners

MLB statistics
- Win–loss record: 17–23
- Earned run average: 4.14
- Strikeouts: 209
- Stats at Baseball Reference

Teams
- Houston Astros (1979); Milwaukee Brewers (1982–1985); Seattle Mariners (1986)

Peter Linwood Ladd (July 17, 1956 – October 20, 2023) was an American professional baseball pitcher. Ladd pitched in all or part of six seasons in Major League Baseball (MLB) between 1979 and 1986. Mainly used as a relief pitcher, Ladd started just one game out of 205 total games pitched. He played collegiately at the University of Mississippi, Oxford.

== Career ==
Ladd was originally drafted by the Boston Red Sox in the 25th round of the 1977 Major League Baseball draft. He was traded to the Houston Astros in June 1979 as part of a deal for Bob Watson, and made his major league debut for Houston two months later. After spending the next two seasons in the Astros' farm system, Ladd was traded to the Milwaukee Brewers for Rickey Keeton.

Ladd spent the first half of 1982 with the Vancouver Canadians. He was called up to the majors in July, and posted a 1–3 record with a 4.00 earned run average in 16 games down the stretch. Despite his lack of experience, Ladd was named the Brewers' closer for the 1982 postseason following an injury to Rollie Fingers. He appeared three times (3.1 innings pitched) without giving up a baserunner while notching 5 strikeouts and picked up a pair of saves in the Brewers' win over the California Angels in the ALCS, including pitching the series clinching ground ball to Rod Carew in Game 5. After allowing the go-ahead run to score in relief of Bob McClure in game 2 of the World Series, he did not appear again in a series that went seven games in a loss to the St. Louis Cardinals.

While serving as the closer during the 1983 season, Ladd saved 25 games in 44 appearances with a 2.55 ERA. He pitched two more seasons for the Brewers before being released. His final major league season was with the Seattle Mariners in 1986. In 1987, he pitched his last professional season for the Albuquerque Dukes in the Los Angeles Dodgers organization.

== Death ==
Ladd died on October 20, 2023, following a short battle with cancer. He was 67.
