= Ricky Adams =

American baseball player (1959–2011)

- Infielder
- Born: January 21, 1959; Upland, California, U.S.
- Died: October 28, 2011 (aged 52); Rancho Cucamonga, California, U.S.
- Batted: Right Threw: Right

MLB debut
- September 15, 1982, for the California Angels

Last MLB appearance
- October 5, 1985, for the San Francisco Giants

MLB statistics
- Batting average: .215
- Home runs: 4
- Runs batted in: 16
- Stats at Baseball Reference

Teams
- California Angels (1982–1983); San Francisco Giants (1985)

Ricky Lee Adams (January 21, 1959 – October 28, 2011) was an American professional baseball player who played three seasons for the California Angels and San Francisco Giants of the Major League Baseball (MLB). In a three-season career, Adams had a batting average of .215 and four home runs.

== Career ==
On June 7, 1977, he was drafted by the Houston Astros in the first round, as the 14th pick, of the 1977 MLB draft. They released him April 4, 1980, after three years in the Astros farm system. On May 2, 1980, he signed as a free agent with the California Angels.

Adams made his debut with the Angels on September 15, 1982, in a loss to the Chicago White Sox. Adams came into the game in the bottom of the 5th inning, replacing Tim Foli at shortstop. He did not get a chance to bat, however, being pulled for pinch hitter Daryl Sconiers in the top of the 7th inning. Adams played in 64 games for the Angels over the next two seasons, primarily on the left side of the infield. He spent all of 1984 in the minor leagues and was granted free agency on October 15. He would sign with the San Francisco Giants on December 25. Adams played in 54 games for the Giants, and would end his career with 75 games for Angels affiliates in 1987.

== Death ==
Adams died on October 28, 2011, in Rancho Cucamonga, California, after a long battle with cancer.
