= Steve Brown (baseball) =

American baseball player (born 1957)

- Pitcher
- Born: February 12, 1957 (age 68); San Francisco, California, U.S.
- Batted: Right Threw: Right

MLB debut
- August 1, 1983, for the California Angels

Last MLB appearance
- April 24, 1984, for the California Angels

MLB statistics
- Win–loss record: 2–4
- Earned run average: 4.58
- Strikeouts: 28
- Stats at Baseball Reference

Teams
- California Angels (1983–1984)

Steven Elbert Brown (born February 12, 1957) is an American former professional baseball player who played two seasons for the California Angels of Major League Baseball (MLB).

Brown is a graduate of the University of California, Davis.he now teaches at Gray Avenue Middle School in Yuba City, California
