= Rob Wilfong =

American baseball player (born 1953)

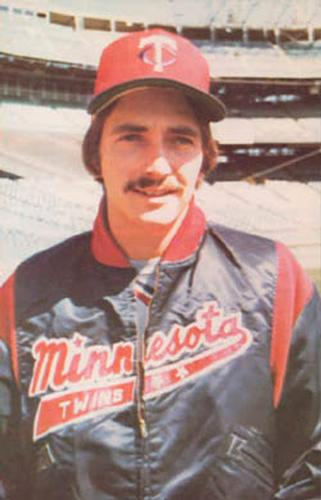
- Second baseman
- Born: September 1, 1953 (age 72); Pasadena, California, U.S.
- Batted: Left Threw: Right

MLB debut
- April 10, 1977, for the Minnesota Twins

Last MLB appearance
- May 8, 1987, for the San Francisco Giants

MLB statistics
- Batting average: .248
- Home runs: 39
- Runs batted in: 261
- Stats at Baseball Reference

Teams
- Minnesota Twins (1977–1982); California Angels (1982–1986); San Francisco Giants (1987)

Robert Donald Wilfong (born September 1, 1953) is an American professional baseball scout and a former Major League Baseball second baseman for the Minnesota Twins (1977–1982), California Angels (1982–1986), and San Francisco Giants (1987). He batted left-handed, threw right-handed, stood 6 feet 1 inch (1.85 m) tall, and weighed 180 pounds (82 kg).

After graduating from Northview High School (Covina, California), Wilfong started his pro career in 1973 with the Twins organization. He made his big-league debut in 1977 and was with the Twins until a trade sent him to the Angels in 1982, reuniting Wilfong with his first Major League manager, Gene Mauch. Wilfong helped the Angels win the American League West Division in 1982 and 1986. Wilfong was the ALCS game 7 starter at 2nd base, but had to come out of the game due to injury. He was replaced by Rick Burleson. The Angels would lose the game and the series to the Red Sox. He finished his career in 1987, playing two games for the Giants. After his playing career, Wilfong became an area scout in Southern California for the Detroit Tigers. In 2012, he was listed as a scout by the Angels, based in San Dimas, California.

He led the American League in Sacrifice Hits (25) in 1979.

In 11 seasons, he played in 959 Games and had 2,690 At Bats, 318 Runs, 668 Hits, 97 Doubles, 23 Triples, 39 Home Runs, 261 RBI, 54 Stolen Bases, 205 Walks, .248 Batting Average, .303 On-base percentage, .345 Slugging Percentage, 928 Total Bases, 86 Sacrifice Hits, 19 Sacrifice Flies, and 13 Intentional Walks.

== Sources ==
- Career statistics from Baseball Reference · Baseball Reference (Minors) · Retrosheet · Baseball Almanac
