= José Moreno (baseball) =

Dominican baseball player (1957–2019)

- Utility player
- Born: November 1, 1957; Santo Domingo, Dominican Republic
- Died: September 6, 2019 (aged 61); Santo Domingo, Dominican Republic
- Batted: Right Threw: Right

MLB debut
- May 24, 1980, for the New York Mets

Last MLB appearance
- May 11, 1982, for the California Angels

MLB statistics
- Batting average: .206
- Home runs: 2
- Runs batted in: 15

CPBL statistics
- Batting average: .240
- Home runs: 11
- Runs batted in: 43
- Stats at Baseball Reference

Teams
- New York Mets (1980); San Diego Padres (1981); California Angels (1982); Mercuries Tigers (1990)

José de los Santos Mauricio Moreno (November 1, 1957 – September 6, 2019) was a Dominican Major League Baseball player. He played all or part of three seasons in the majors between 1980 and 1982, playing for a different team in each season.

Although Moreno played in 82 games in his major league career, he played no more than seven games in the field at any one position, and just 20 games in the field in all. Most of his appearances came as a pinch hitter, with some as a pinch runner as well.

Moreno died on September 6, 2019, at the age of 61.
