= Ron Jackson (baseball, born 1953) =

American baseball player (born 1953)

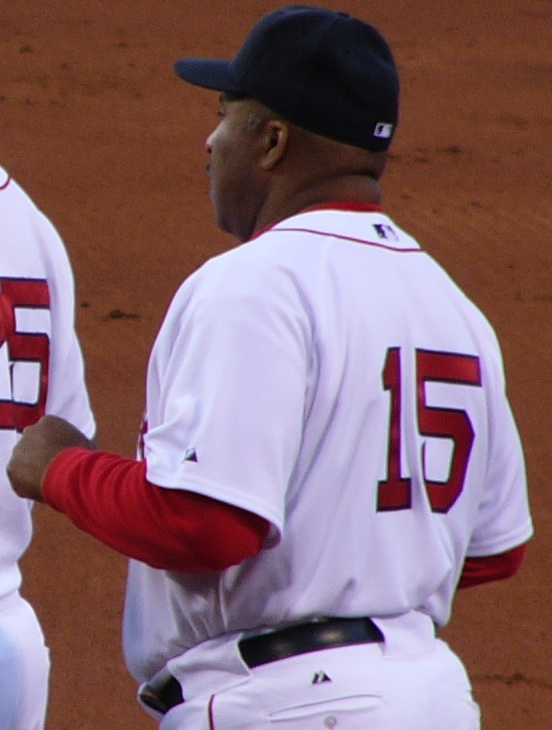
- Jackson with the Boston Red Sox in 2006
- First baseman / Third baseman
- Born: May 9, 1953 (age 72); Birmingham, Alabama, U.S.
- Batted: Right Threw: Right

MLB debut
- September 12, 1975, for the California Angels

Last MLB appearance
- September 29, 1984, for the Baltimore Orioles

MLB statistics
- Batting average: .259
- Home runs: 56
- Runs batted in: 342
- Stats at Baseball Reference

Teams
- California Angels (1975–1978); Minnesota Twins (1979–1981); Detroit Tigers (1981); California Angels (1982–1984); Baltimore Orioles (1984)

Ronnie Damien Jackson (born May 9, 1953) is an American coach and a former player in Major League Baseball. He was the hitting coach for the Boston Red Sox in 2004 when they won their first World Series in 86 seasons.

From 1975 through 1984, Jackson played first base and third base with the California Angels (1975–78, 1982–84), Minnesota Twins (1979–81), Detroit Tigers (1981) and Baltimore Orioles (1984). He batted and threw right-handed.

Jackson was called up to the Angels after hitting .281 in 144 games for the Salt Lake City Gulls of the Pacific Coast League, and made his major league debut on September 12, 1975.

In a 10-year career, Jackson compiled a .259 batting average with 56 home runs and 342 RBI in 926 games.

Jackson played for managers Gene Mauch, Sparky Anderson, Dick Williams and Jim Fregosi. With the Angels, he hit a career-high .297 in 1978, and in 1979 posted personal highs in hits (158), doubles (40), home runs (14), RBI (68), runs (85) and games (153) for Minnesota. In that season, his .9943 fielding percentage at first base broke Rod Carew's Twins' record.

Following his retirement as a player, Jackson coached for the Brewers, Dodgers and White Sox systems. The 2006 season marked his 18th year as a major league or minor league hitting coach, and his fourth with the Boston Red Sox. In his first two seasons with Boston, the Red Sox led the majors in runs, batting average, doubles, extra-base hits, total bases, on-base percentage and slugging average. In 2003 the Sox set ML records for extra-base hits, total bases and slugging, finishing one off the major league lead with 238 home runs. The Red Sox tied an ML record with 373 doubles in 2004.

Jackson served as the hitting coach for the Round Rock Express, then the top affiliate of the Houston Astros from 2007 to 2009.

He currently serves as a guest instructor at the New York Baseball Academy and coached Birmingham's Willie Mays Youth Baseball team to the 2014 championship of the Junior RBI Classic in Minneapolis.

| Preceded by Dwight Evans | Boston Red Sox hitting coach 2003–2006 | Succeeded by Dave Magadan |
