= Rick Steirer =

American baseball player (born 1956)

- Pitcher
- Born: August 27, 1956 (age 69); Baltimore, Maryland, U.S.
- Batted: Right Threw: Right

MLB debut
- August 5, 1982, for the California Angels

Last MLB appearance
- September 24, 1984, for the California Angels

MLB statistics
- Win–loss record: 4–3
- Earned run average: 4.86
- Strikeouts: 41
- Stats at Baseball Reference

Teams
- California Angels (1982–1984)

Ricky Francis Steirer (born August 27, 1956) is an American former professional baseball player who played three seasons for the California Angels of Major League Baseball (MLB) from 1982 through 1984. He was selected in the fifth round of the 1977 MLB draft by the Angels.
