= Tim Foli =

American baseball player (born 1950)

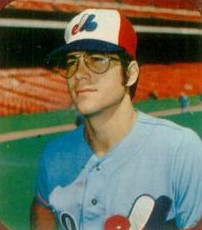
- Foli in 1975
- Shortstop
- Born: December 6, 1950 (age 75); Culver City, California, U.S.
- Batted: Right Threw: Right

MLB debut
- September 11, 1970, for the New York Mets

Last MLB appearance
- June 15, 1985, for the Pittsburgh Pirates

MLB statistics
- Batting average: .251
- Home runs: 25
- Runs batted in: 501
- Stats at Baseball Reference

Teams
- New York Mets (1970–1971); Montreal Expos (1972–1977); San Francisco Giants (1977); New York Mets (1978–1979); Pittsburgh Pirates (1979–1981); California Angels (1982–1983); New York Yankees (1984); Pittsburgh Pirates (1985)

Career highlights and awards
- World Series champion (1979)

Timothy John Foli (born December 6, 1950) is an American former professional baseball player, coach and minor league manager. He played in Major League Baseball (MLB) as a shortstop for the New York Mets, Montreal Expos, San Francisco Giants, Pittsburgh Pirates, California Angels and New York Yankees from 1970 to 1985. At age 17, Foli was the first pick in the Major League Baseball draft in 1968 and went on to be a member of the 1979 World Series champion Pirates. Foli was known as a fiery player who was a reliable fielder but only an average hitter. Foli was a free swinger, especially in 1982 when he walked only 14 times, the lowest total ever for 150 or more games played (Ozzie Guillén broke Foli's dubious record three years later). His free swinging did not aim for the fences, however, as he averaged less than two home runs per season.

His lack of power, combined with a lack of running speed (averaging approximately a stolen base every 20 games) resulted in Foli typically batting either second in the lineup or near the bottom. Although he accumulated few walks, Foli was also one of the most difficult to strike out, posting the league's best strikeout percentage three times and finishing in the top ten five times. Foli compiled a .333 batting average in the 1979 postseason, contributing to Pittsburgh's last World Championship. He was an accomplished bunter, finishing in the league top ten in sacrifice hits eight times including an American League-leading 26 in 1982.

Defensively, Foli led league shortstops in fielding percentage in 1980 and 1982. He led the National League in double plays twice, in total chances twice, and in putouts once. Foli's defensive low occurred on September 9, 1972, when he committed three errors in one inning, leading to three runs in Montreal's 8–3 loss to the Pittsburgh Pirates at Jarry Park.

== Early years ==
Foli was born in Culver City, California, and attended Notre Dame High School in Sherman Oaks, Los Angeles, California. He was a high school star in both baseball and football and was offered a football scholarship by the University of Southern California. When the New York Mets made Foli the first overall draft pick in the 1968 Major League Baseball draft, he decided to forgo football for the major leagues.

== Playing career ==
At age seventeen, Foli started out poorly with the Marion Mets of the Appalachian League. The following year, while the Mets were on their way to winning the 1969 World Series, Foli hit over .300 for their high Class A minor league team, the Visalia Mets of the California League. In 1970, Foli posted decent numbers for the Triple-A Tidewater Tides and the Mets called the 19-year-old up to the majors on September 11. At the time, he was the fourth youngest player in the majors, behind César Cedeño, Balor Moore and Don Gullett. In his second game, Foli started at third base, picked up two hits and drove in a late run as the Mets defeated the St. Louis Cardinals. The defending champions faded the rest of the way and missed the playoffs.

Foli spent all of 1971 with the Mets, fighting for playing time at second base and third base. On May 9, he had an RBI triple and a three-run double in the first two innings for his first four-RBI game. It would prove to be his last four-RBI game until 1979. In 97 games, his batting average was .226, with both his on-base percentage and slugging percentage below .300.

=== Montreal ===
Before the 1972 season, the Mets packaged Foli with fellow young prospects Ken Singleton and Mike Jorgensen and sent them to the Montreal Expos for star outfielder Rusty Staub. Foli became a mainstay at shortstop in Montreal for the next five seasons. Although Foli, Singleton and Jorgensen played well in Montreal, the Expos never posted a winning record until after Foli was gone and even lost 107 games in 1976.

Foli's offensive numbers in five seasons with Montreal were representative of his whole career. He batted between .238 and .264 each season, only once slugging over .300, and only once reaching .300 in on-base percentage. 1976 was the only offensive season that stood out for Foli, as he posted career highs with 36 doubles (fifth-highest in the N.L.), six home runs and a .366 slugging average. On April 21, 1976, Foli hit a single, double and triple against the Chicago Cubs before the game was suspended on account of darkness. (Wrigley Field did not have lights at that point.) When the game was resumed the next day, Foli hit a home run to complete the first cycle in Montreal Expos history. In addition, Foli's cycle was the first "natural cycle" (where the single, double, triple and home run are hit in that sequence) in almost a decade.

Foli was popular in Montreal, as evidenced on July 8, 1973, when Houston Astros left fielder Bob Watson slid hard into Foli at second base trying to break up a double play, breaking Foli's jaw. When Watson returned to left field in the next half-inning, the Montreal fans at Jarry Park hurled debris at him. Foli missed the next month of the season.

=== Journeyman ===
1977 was the beginning of Foli's time as a major league journeyman. In his final nine seasons, Foli spent seven different stints with six different franchises. His travels began on April 26, 1977, when he was traded from the Expos to the San Francisco Giants for Chris Speier in an exchange of starting shortstops. Foli, who was batting .175 at the time of the trade, hit only .228 for the Giants, who finished well out of playoff contention. Foli's Giants highlight was on July 22, when he had the only two-homer game of his career.

After the 1977 season, Foli's original team, the Mets, purchased his contract from San Francisco. 1978 was a typical season for Foli, who played 113 games and batted .257, while the Mets finished with the worst record in the National League.

=== Championship in Pittsburgh ===
After playing just three games for the Mets in 1979, Foli and a minor league player were traded to the Pittsburgh Pirates in exchange for shortstop Frank Taveras. The trade sent Foli from the worst team in the league to one of the best. Pittsburgh was locked in a season-long battle with Montreal for first place, but took the lead for good in the final days of the season. Foli set career highs in batting average, RBI, runs, hits and on-base percentage. He also struck out once every 38 at bats, a strikeout ratio which has not been bested since.

Pittsburgh went on to sweep the Cincinnati Reds in the 1979 National League Championship Series, with Foli driving in a run in all three games. In the World Series, Foli had a hit in six of the seven games. With the Pirates trailing three games to one, and facing 23-game winner and 1979 Cy Young Award winner Mike Flanagan in game 5, Foli scored the tying run and drove in three insurance runs to keep the Pirates alive in the series. Foli then scored a run in Game 6 against Jim Palmer and the Pirates forced a Game 7, which they won the next day to capture the fifth World Championship in team history.

Foli posted typical numbers for him in 1980 and the strike-shortened 1981 season, but the Pirates, suffering from the decline of future Baseball Hall of Fame member Willie Stargell, as well as other intangibles, dropped from World Champions to mediocrity.

=== Late career ===
After the 1981 season and shortly after his 31st birthday, Foli was traded again, moving from Pittsburgh to the California Angels in exchange for 22-year-old catcher Brian Harper. Foli was reunited with Gene Mauch, his manager from Montreal. He was slated to be a utility infielder for the Angels, but when Rick Burleson suffered a torn rotator cuff in mid-April, Foli spent the season as the starting shortstop. A mid-September winning streak propelled the Angels into first place and into the 1982 American League playoffs, but they lost to the Milwaukee Brewers three games to two, as Foli managed only two hits and one RBI.

Foli played very little in the last third of the next season, finishing with only 88 games. Towards the end of the season, Foli was suspended by the team for not being in uniform after a September 11 rain delay. The Angels traded Foli to the New York Yankees for pitcher Curt Kaufman after the season. In 61 games, Foli played all four infield positions for the Yankees, who traded him to Pittsburgh after the season in a trade which brought 20-year-old Jay Buhner to the Yankees.

Foli batted just .189 in 19 games with the Pirates in 1985, before Pittsburgh released him on June 17. Foli, then aged 34, was signed by the Single-A Miami Marlins, but retired after playing just one game with the team.

== Post-playing career ==
After retirement as a player, Tim Foli turned to coaching. He was the third base coach and infield coach for the Texas Rangers in 1986 and 1987. During the off-season in early 1987, Foli was the manager of the Caguas, Puerto Rico, team in the Caribbean World Series when his fiery personality made news. After losing the first two games to the Dominican Republic, Caguas general manager Félix Millán fired Foli, claiming he had been disrespectful. Caguas recovered to win the championship.

On November 19, 1991, Foli was named the first base coach and infield coach for the Milwaukee Brewers, rejoining fellow coach Duffy Dyer, who had been a teammate of his while with the Mets. On September 29, 1995, Foli and Dyer were both let go by the Brewers. Foli spent 1996 as a coach with the Kansas City Royals under manager Bob Boone, who was Foli's teammate with the California Angels. He then managed the Rookie-level Kingsport Mets of the Appalachian League in 1998 and spent 1998 to 2000 with the New York Mets organization as an infield and base running coordinator.

On September 16, 2000, Foli began three tumultuous seasons as a coach with the Cincinnati Reds, reunited with former Angels catcher Bob Boone, who was the Reds' manager. Just a few months into his coaching job, Foli became embroiled in a physical confrontation with fellow coach Ron Oester after a game. Foli required stitches. The turmoil in Cincinnati did not soon end, as Oester was let go after the season, the team's superstar, Ken Griffey Jr. was injured in four consecutive seasons, coach Ken Griffey Sr. resigned on bad terms, and the Reds posted three consecutive losing seasons. As a result, Foli, Boone, the general manager and another coach were all fired on July 28, 2003.

After taking 2004 off, Foli spent two seasons as manager of the Washington Nationals' Triple-A team, the New Orleans Zephyrs of the Pacific Coast League; the team had a record of 64–76 (14th place) in 2005, and 72–71 (9th place) in 2006. In 2007, he served as minor league field coordinator for the Nationals. He then managed Washington's Triple-A teams in the International League for two seasons; in 2008 the Columbus Clippers (69–73, tied for 7th place) and in 2009 the Syracuse Chiefs (76–68, 5th place).

== Personal life ==
In 1981, Foli was described by George Vecsey in The New York Times as an "intense born-again."

Foli's son, Daniel Foli, was drafted by the Chicago Cubs in the 31st round of the 2001 MLB draft. He pitched in the minor leagues from 2001 through 2009, for teams affiliated with the Cubs (2001–2003), Mets (2004–2005), Nationals (2006–2007), and Astros (2007). He spent his final two seasons in the independent Atlantic League with the York Revolution (2008–2009). In nine seasons, he compiled a record of 35–50 with a 5.07 ERA and 1.587 WHIP.

== See also ==
- List of Major League Baseball players to hit for the cycle

Achievements
Preceded by Lou Brock	Hitting for the cycle April 22, 1976	Succeeded by Larry Hisle
