= Daryl Sconiers =

American baseball player (born 1958)

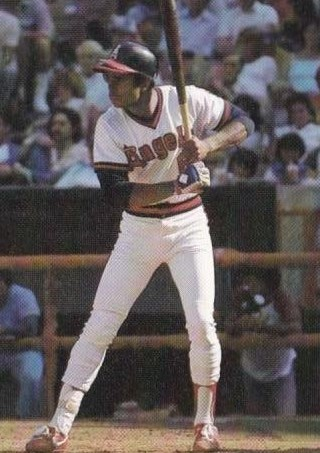
- First baseman
- Born: October 3, 1958 (age 67); San Bernardino, California, U.S.
- Batted: Left Threw: Left

MLB debut
- September 13, 1981, for the California Angels

Last MLB appearance
- October 6, 1985, for the California Angels

MLB statistics
- Batting average: .265
- Home runs: 15
- Runs batted in: 84
- Stats at Baseball Reference

Teams
- California Angels (1981–1985)

Daryl Anthony Sconiers (born October 3, 1958) is an American former professional baseball first baseman.

Sconiers attended Fontana High School in Fontana, California though he told the Los Angeles Times his friends were not interested in school and he attended only often enough to maintain eligibility for the school's baseball team. As a senior at Fontana, he had a batting average of .515. He was undrafted out of high school and played college baseball at Orange Coast College.

He played all or part of five seasons with the California Angels of Major League Baseball (MLB), between 1981 and 1985.

For a period in May 1982, Sconiers was absent from the team without permission or explanation and the Angels organization was unable to locate or contact him. After the same occurred during spring training in 1985, Sconiers admitted to having a substance abuse problem. He was let go after the season and never played in the major leagues again. Before his release, he was considered the heir apparent to future Hall of Famer Rod Carew's starting first base job. He continued to play in the minor leagues until 1991.

In 1986 and 1987, Sconiers played unaffiliated ball with the San Jose Bees along with several other former Major League players who had been afflicted by substance abuse problems. Sconiers once went missing from the team for three days on a crack cocaine binge.

== Sources ==
- Career statistics from Baseball Reference · Baseball Reference (Minors) · Retrosheet · Baseball Almanac
