= Fred Lynn =

American baseball player (born 1952)

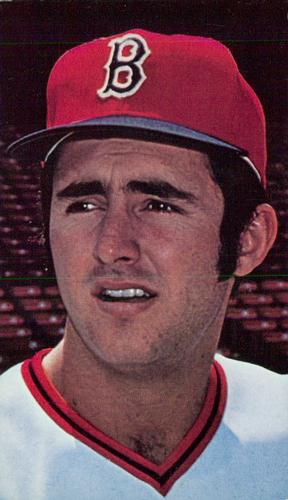
- Lynn with the Boston Red Sox in 1976
- Center fielder
- Born: February 3, 1952 (age 74); Chicago, Illinois, U.S.
- Batted: Left Threw: Left

MLB debut
- September 5, 1974, for the Boston Red Sox

Last MLB appearance
- October 3, 1990, for the San Diego Padres

MLB statistics
- Batting average: .283
- Home runs: 306
- Runs batted in: 1,111
- Stats at Baseball Reference

Teams
- Boston Red Sox (1974–1980); California Angels (1981–1984); Baltimore Orioles (1985–1988); Detroit Tigers (1988–1989); San Diego Padres (1990)

Career highlights and awards
- 9× All-Star (1975–1983); AL MVP (1975); AL Rookie of the Year (1975); ALCS MVP (1982); 4× Gold Glove Award (1975, 1978–1980); AL batting champion (1979); Boston Red Sox Hall of Fame

Member of the National College

Baseball Hall of Fame
- Induction: 2007
Medals
Men's baseball
Representing United States
Pan American Games
Silver medal – second place	1971 Cali	Team

Fredric Michael Lynn (born February 3, 1952) is an American former professional baseball center fielder who played 17 seasons in Major League Baseball (MLB), mostly with the Boston Red Sox and the California Angels. He was the first player to win MLB's Rookie of the Year Award and Most Valuable Player Award in the same year, which he accomplished in 1975 with the Red Sox.

Lynn was inducted into the Boston Red Sox Hall of Fame in 2002 and to the College Baseball Hall of Fame in 2007.

== Early life ==
Lynn was born in Chicago, and graduated from El Monte High School located in Los Angeles County in 1969. He was drafted by the New York Yankees in the 3rd round in the 1970 amateur draft but he chose to attend the University of Southern California, where he was a member of the USC Trojans baseball teams that won the College World Series in 1971, 1972, and 1973. He represented the United States at the 1971 Pan American Games, where he won a silver medal. He was selected by the Red Sox in the second round of the 1973 MLB draft, with the 41st overall pick. Lynn played in Boston's minor league system during 1973 (with the Double-A Bristol Red Sox) and during 1974 (with the Triple-A Pawtucket Red Sox).

== Professional career ==
=== Boston Red Sox (1974–1980) ===
Lynn made his major league debut on September 5, 1974, in a Boston loss to the Milwaukee Brewers. He appeared in 15 games through the end of the season, batting 18-for-43 (.419).

Lynn had an outstanding 1975 season; in 145 games with the Red Sox, he batted .331 with 21 home runs and 105 RBIs. He led the American League (AL) in doubles, runs scored, and slugging percentage, finished second in batting (Rod Carew of the Minnesota Twins hit .359), and won a Gold Glove Award for his defensive play. Lynn won both the Most Valuable Player Award and Rookie of the Year Award, becoming the first player to win both in the same season; the feat was later duplicated by Seattle Mariners right fielder Ichiro Suzuki in 2001. That year, he was also named the Associated Press Athlete of the Year. In a game on June 18 at Tiger Stadium, Lynn hit three home runs, had 10 RBIs, and 16 total bases in one game. Lynn and fellow rookie outfielder Jim Rice were dubbed the "Gold Dust Twins". In the 1975 World Series, which Boston lost in seven games to the Cincinnati Reds, Lynn batted 7-for-25 (.280) with a home run and five RBIs.

Lynn won three more Gold Gloves (1978, 1979, and 1980), and in 1979 won the AL batting title with a .333 average and finished fourth in MVP voting. He was elected to the All-Star team each season from 1975 through 1980 with Boston. On May 13, 1980, he hit for the cycle.

In seven seasons with the Red Sox, Lynn batted .308 with 124 home runs and 521 RBIs in 828 games played.

=== California Angels (1981–1984) ===
In January 1981, Lynn and Steve Renko were traded to the Angels for Frank Tanana, Jim Dorsey, and Joe Rudi. Lynn was limited to 76 games in his first year with the Angels, 1981, due to a knee injury. For the season, he batted just .219 with five home runs and 31 RBIs. He played three more seasons with the Angels, batting .299 in 138 games during 1982, .272 in 117 games in 1983, and .271 in 142 games in 1984. His .299 average in 1982 would be the closest he would come to batting .300 again.

In 1982, Lynn and the Angels won the AL West division and made the playoffs, but lost in the 1982 ALCS to the Milwaukee Brewers in 5 games. Even so, Lynn was selected as MVP of the ALCS, becoming the first player from a losing team to be so honored. Lynn batted an astounding .611 (11 hits in 18 at-bats), with a home run and 5 RBI's. Lynn was an All-Star in his first three seasons with the Angels, bringing his total number of selections to nine; he was the MVP of the 1983 All-Star Game, hitting the first grand slam in All-Star Game history. Overall, in his four seasons with the Angels, Lynn appeared in 473 games, batting .271 with 71 home runs and 270 RBIs.

In 1981, Lawrence Ritter and Donald Honig included Lynn in their book, The 100 Greatest Baseball Players of All Time, with Lynn being ranked 99.

=== Baltimore Orioles (1985–1988) ===
A free agent following the 1984 season, Lynn defied expectations that he would continue his career with a West Coast team by accepting the best offer and signing a five-year $6.8 million contract with the Baltimore Orioles on December 11. His signing, along with that of Lee Lacy and Don Aase, cost the ballclub three of its top five picks in the 1985 MLB draft and was part of Edward Bennett Williams' ill-fated attempt to buy championships which only resulted in last-place finishes in 1986 and 1988. Lynn's time in Baltimore was most noted for his complaints about the Orioles' caps which he called "the hat with the funny little duck on it" due to the smiling cartoon bird on the front. Lynn played for the Orioles from the start of the 1985 seasons through August 1988, appearing in a total of 434 games while batting .265 with 87 home runs and 232 RBIs.

=== Detroit Tigers (1988–1989) ===
On August 31, 1988, the Orioles traded Lynn to the Detroit Tigers for Chris Hoiles, Cesar Mejia, and Robinson Garces. Detroit traded for Lynn for their 1988 pennant drive, and there was some initial controversy about his postseason eligibility. His acquisition was made on the day of the MLB trade deadline, and Lynn did not arrive in Chicago (where the Tigers had played that day) until after the deadline had passed; he was initially declared ineligible for postseason play. MLB commissioner Peter Ueberroth later overruled this decision, declaring that as long as the transaction was completed by the deadline, the player did not need to physically "report" to his new team before the deadline. The controversy later proved to be moot, as Detroit finished one game behind Boston in the AL East.

Lynn appeared in 27 games with Detroit through the end of the 1988 season, batting .222 with seven home runs and 19 RBIs. In 1989, he appeared in 117 games, batting .241 with 11 home runs and 46 RBIs. In November 1989, Lynn became a free agent.

=== San Diego Padres (1990) ===
In December 1989, Lynn signed with the Padres, his first and only National League team. He played 90 games during the 1990 season, batting .240 with six home runs and 23 RBIs at age 38. After the season, he again became a free agent. He was not invited to spring training by any team in 1991, and although he kept in shape in case an opportunity to join a team arose, he did not play in the major leagues again.

=== Career statistics ===
In his 17-year career, Lynn batted .283 with 1,111 RBIs, 1,960 hits, 1,063 runs, 306 home runs, 388 doubles, 43 triples, and 72 stolen bases in 1969 games. From 1982 to 1988, he had seven consecutive seasons of hitting more than twenty home runs (his totals were 21-22-23-23-23-23-25). His 306 career home runs place him, through the end of the 2017 seasons, in 13th place among center fielders. Defensively, Lynn recorded a career .988 fielding percentage at centerfield, his primary position.

In 15 career postseason games, Lynn batted 22-for-54 (.407) with two home runs and 13 RBIs. Lynn was a nine-time All-Star, batting an overall 6-for-20 (.300) in All-Star Games with four home runs and ten RBIs, including the first (and to date, only) grand slam in All-Star Game history, which he hit in the 1983 game. His four home runs in All-Star Games is second only to Stan Musial with six.

Lynn's career was hampered by some injuries caused by fearless play, such as a broken rib from crashing into an outfield wall, or knee injuries from breaking up double plays, and playing all-out defensively. He never played more than 150 games in a season, and only topped 140 games four times.

Lynn played for five different teams, but considers himself a member of the Red Sox family. "I'm a Red Sock. I didn't want to leave the Red Sox," said Lynn, further noting, "I came up with them and from 1973 to 1980 I was their property. I thought I'd end up spending my entire career in Boston. It was tough, even though I was going to a great team [the Angels] and playing for a great owner in Gene Autry."

== Post-playing career ==
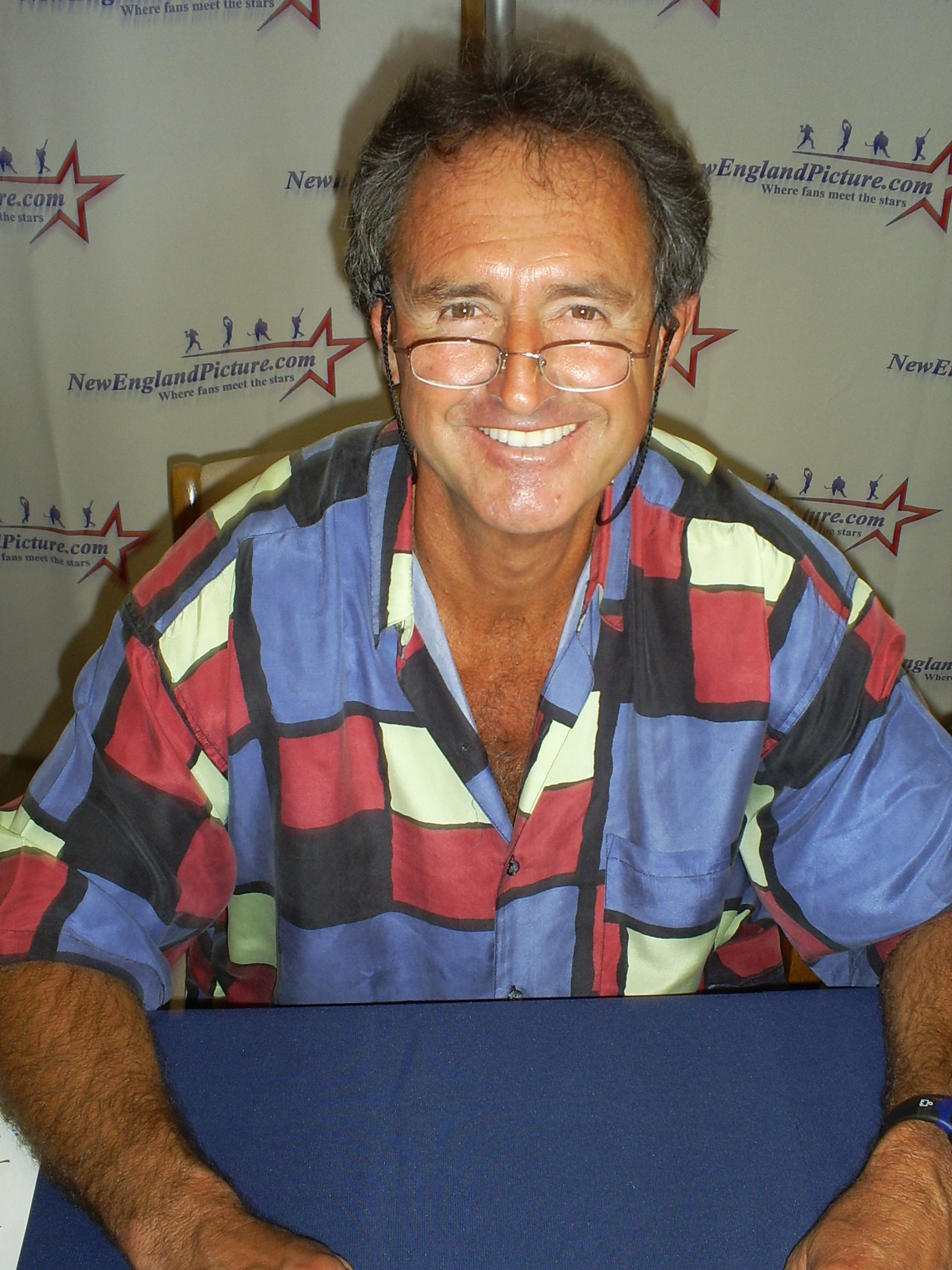
Fred Lynn in 2007

Lynn worked as a baseball color analyst for ESPN from 1991 to 1998, doing some College World Series games and some west coast MLB games. He has also been a spokesman for Gillette and MasterCard, and occasionally entertains clients at Red Sox games from the Legends Skybox at Fenway Park.

Lynn has raised thousands of dollars through charity work for Childhaven, a home for abused and neglected children, and FACE Foundation, an animal charity. He has been a frequent participant in the All-Star Legends and Celebrity Softball Game, held annually since 2001 in the days leading up to the MLB All-Star Game.

Lynn was inducted into the USC Hall of Fame in 1994, and was selected by fans to the Red Sox' All-Fenway Team in 2012.

== Personal life ==
While in high school, Lynn met a fellow student named Diane May Minkle, a cheerleader who went by the name "Dee Dee". The two married in February 1974, and went on to have two children, son Jason and daughter Jennifer. Fred and Dee Dee later divorced. Lynn has three grandchildren through his first marriage.

In 1986, Lynn married second wife Natalie Cole. As of 2014, Lynn resided in Carlsbad, California, with his wife.

== See also ==
- List of Major League Baseball career home run leaders
- List of Major League Baseball career runs scored leaders
- List of Major League Baseball career runs batted in leaders
- List of Major League Baseball players who hit for the cycle
- List of Major League Baseball batting champions
- List of Major League Baseball annual runs scored leaders
- List of Major League Baseball annual doubles leaders

Achievements
Preceded by Iván DeJesús	Hitting for the cycle May 13, 1980	Succeeded by Mike Easler
