= Luis Sánchez (baseball) =

Venezuelan baseball player (1953–2005)

- Relief pitcher
- Born: September 24, 1953; Cariaco, Venezuela
- Died: February 4, 2005 (aged 51); La Guaira, Venezuela
- Batted: Right Threw: Right

Professional debut
- MLB: April 10, 1981, for the California Angels
- NPB: April 6, 1986, for the Yomiuri Giants

Last appearance
- MLB: October 6, 1985, for the California Angels
- NPB: October 18, 1987, for the Yomiuri Giants

MLB statistics
- Win–loss record: 28–21
- Earned run average: 3.75
- Strikeouts: 216
- Stats at Baseball Reference

Teams
- California Angels (1981–1985); Yomiuri Giants (1986–1987)

Luis Mercedes Escobar Sánchez (September 24, 1953 – February 4, 2005), nicknamed "Escoba" (broom), was a Venezuelan relief pitcher in Major League Baseball who played for the California Angels. He also played in Japan for the Yomiuri Giants. And in Venezuela's LVBP with Tiburones de la Guaira from 1972 till 1992. He batted and threw right-handed.

== Career ==
A native of Cariaco, Venezuela, Sánchez was signed by the Houston Astros as an amateur free agent in 1971. After playing through 1976 in the minor league systems of Houston and Cincinnati, Sánchez appeared in the Mexican League.

Sánchez was the Angels' closer from 1983 to 1984. After the emergence of Donnie Moore in 1985, he divided his time in the bullpen as a middle reliever or set-up man. In 1986 and 1987, he pitched for the Yomiuri Giants.

In a five-year major league career, Sánchez posted a 28–21 record with 216 strikeouts, 27 saves and a 3.75 ERA in 369 innings.

Sánchez died in Vargas State, Venezuela at age 51.

== See also ==
- List of Major League Baseball players from Venezuela
