= Gene Mauch =

American baseball player and manager (1925–2005)

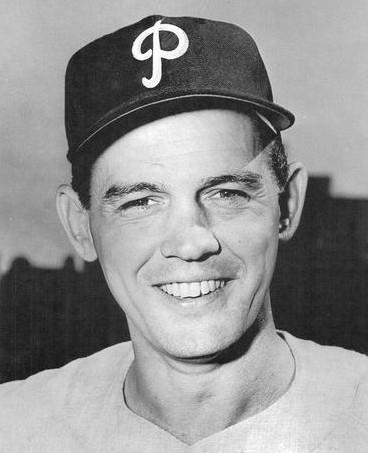
- Mauch in 1961
- Infielder / Manager
- Born: November 18, 1925; Salina, Kansas, U.S.
- Died: August 8, 2005 (aged 79); Rancho Mirage, California, U.S.
- Batted: Right Threw: Right

MLB debut
- April 18, 1944, for the Brooklyn Dodgers

Last MLB appearance
- September 28, 1957, for the Boston Red Sox

MLB statistics
- Batting average: .239
- Home runs: 5
- Runs batted in: 62
- Managerial record: 1,902–2,037
- Winning %: .483
- Stats at Baseball Reference
- Managerial record at Baseball Reference

Teams
- As player: Brooklyn Dodgers (1944); Pittsburgh Pirates (1947); Brooklyn Dodgers (1948); Chicago Cubs (1948–1949); Boston Braves (1950–1951); St. Louis Cardinals (1952); Boston Red Sox (1956–1957); As manager: Philadelphia Phillies (1960–1968); Montreal Expos (1969–1975); Minnesota Twins (1976–1980); California Angels (1981–1982, 1985–1987)

Career highlights and awards
- Montreal Expos Hall of Fame

Gene William Mauch (November 18, 1925 – August 8, 2005) was an American professional baseball player and manager who played in Major League Baseball (MLB) as a second baseman for the Brooklyn Dodgers (1944, 1948), Pittsburgh Pirates (1947), Chicago Cubs (1948–1949), Boston Braves (1950–1951), St. Louis Cardinals (1952) and Boston Red Sox (1956–1957).

Mauch was best known for managing four teams from 1960 to 1987. He is by far the winningest manager to have never won a league pennant or the World Series (breaking the record formerly held by Jimmy Dykes), three times coming within a single victory of reaching the World Series. Mauch additionally has the most wins of any eligible manager not elected to the National Baseball Hall of Fame. Mauch managed the Philadelphia Phillies (1960–1968), Montreal Expos (1969–1975 — as their inaugural manager), Minnesota Twins (1976–1980) and California Angels (1981–1982, 1985–1987). His 1,902 career victories ranked 8th in MLB history when he retired, and his 3,942 total games managed ranked 4th. Mauch gained a reputation for playing a distinctive "small ball" style, which emphasized defense, speed, and base-to-base tactics on offense, rather than power hitting.

== Playing career ==
Born in Salina, Kansas, Mauch was raised there and in Los Angeles, where he graduated from John C. Fremont High School. His professional baseball career began in 1943, when he was 17. Reaching the majors the following season during the World War II manpower shortage, Mauch played for six different clubs over all or parts of nine MLB seasons between 1944 and 1957. In 304 games and 737 at-bats, Mauch hit .239, with 176 hits, including 25 doubles, seven triples and five home runs. He was credited with 62 RBIs, striking out 82 times. He missed part of 1944 and all of the 1945 season while performing wartime service in the United States Army Air Forces.

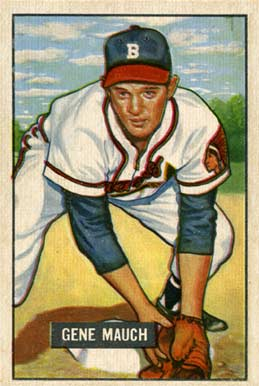
A 1951 Bowman Gum card of Mauch

In 1953, the Milwaukee Braves named Mauch, then 27 years old, the player-manager of their Double-A Atlanta Crackers farm team in the Southern Association, his first managerial assignment. His team finished 84–70, in third place, three games behind the Memphis Chickasaws, and fell in the first round of the playoffs to the eventual league champion Nashville Vols. The combative Mauch was known for frequent skirmishes with the league's umpires and he later conceded that he was too young for the assignment. But seven years later, John J. Quinn, who as the Braves' general manager had hired him for the Crackers' job, would give Mauch his first big-league managerial opportunity with the 1960 Phillies.

From 1954 to 1957, Mauch was strictly a player, first for the Los Angeles Angels of the Pacific Coast League, then the Red Sox. His final big-league season, 1957 with Boston, was his most productive. He started 65 games as the Bosox' second baseman and batted a career-high .270 with 60 hits. But the following season, he began his managerial career in earnest. In 1958–59, he piloted the Red Sox' Triple-A affiliate, the Minneapolis Millers, reaching the Junior World Series as American Association champion each season, and winning the 1958 JWS championship.

During the off-season prior to the 1960 campaign, Mauch declined an offer to interview with Quinn for an opening on the Phillies' coaching staff, saying he wanted to focus on managing. He went to spring training with the Millers and prepared for his third season as their manager. In the final days of spring drills, Quinn called Mauch again and asked him to replace veteran Phillies' pilot Eddie Sawyer, who had resigned after the team's opening game on April 12. Four days later, Mauch—34 years old at time—became the youngest manager in the Major Leagues in 1960.

== Managerial career ==
Mauch was a strong advocate of "small ball", the emphasis on offensive fundamentals such as bunting, sacrifice plays, and other ways of advancing runners, as opposed to trying to score runs primarily through slugging. His teams generally played in ballparks that were not friendly to home run hitters, which increased the effectiveness of this approach. While his teams occasionally featured power hitters such as Dick Allen, Rusty Staub, and Reggie Jackson, they depended just as heavily on hitters adept at getting on base through contact hitting and patience at the plate, such as Rod Carew and Brian Downing, and on strong defensive play by such stars as Bobby Grich, Bob Boone, and Doug DeCinces. As far as pitchers were concerned, he stressed the importance of changing eye levels, arguing that they should follow up low pitches with high pitches and vice versa in order to confuse the batters.

Renowned as an excellent manager of his bench, Mauch also had a reputation for provoking opposing teams with taunting and of having a strong temperament that stressed himself and his teams excessively in the belief that he could win by sheer will. Mauch had frequent fiery exchanges with umpires. Mauch was not shy when arguing with an umpiring play. He used his bombastic personality to help his team gain any possible advantage on the baseball diamond. Mauch had a brilliant baseball mind and is sometimes credited with starting the "double player switch". Mauch gained a reputation for being loyal to his players and became known as the Little General.

=== Philadelphia Phillies ===
Mauch took command of the Phillies two games into the 1960 season. He managed them to a 58–94 record. The following year, they finished 47–107; from July 29 to August 20, they lost 23 straight games, which ranks as the third-longest losing streak in baseball history along with the longest in the 20th century. The following year, they finished 81–80. This was their first season over .500 since 1953. He was named Manager of the Year by the Associated Press that year. "It makes me very happy," he said of the honor. "The only thing that will make me any happier is when the Phillies are the Team of the Year." The Phillies improved to an 87–75 record the next season, which was also the first time that the team had two straight winning seasons since 1952-1953.

In late September 1964, his Phillies had a record of 90–60, a 6 1/2-game lead in the National League with 12 games left to play, and were starting a 7-game home stand. Mauch decided to start his two pitching aces, Jim Bunning and Chris Short, in 7 of the last 10 games, 4 of those starts on 2 days' rest (all of which they lost). The Phillies faded, losing 10 games in a row before winning their last 2 games to finish tied for second place with the Cincinnati Reds, one game behind Johnny Keane's St. Louis Cardinals in a collapse infamously known as the "Phold." Ultimately, the season was the peak for the team in terms of wins and finish in his tenure, although Mauch became the first Phillies manager to have three straight winning seasons since Pat Moran from 1915 to 1917.

Due to Keane leaving the Cardinals for the New York Yankees after the season, Mauch was selected to manage the 1965 Major League Baseball All-Star Game, which the National League won 6–5. His next three full seasons all resulted in over .500 finishes, though they did not finish above 4th. Mauch was let go after the Phillies were 27–27 during the 1968 season. His 646 wins as manager stood as a team record until 2011, when Charlie Manuel passed him. Mauch still ranks 1st in club history with losses (684).

=== Montreal Expos ===
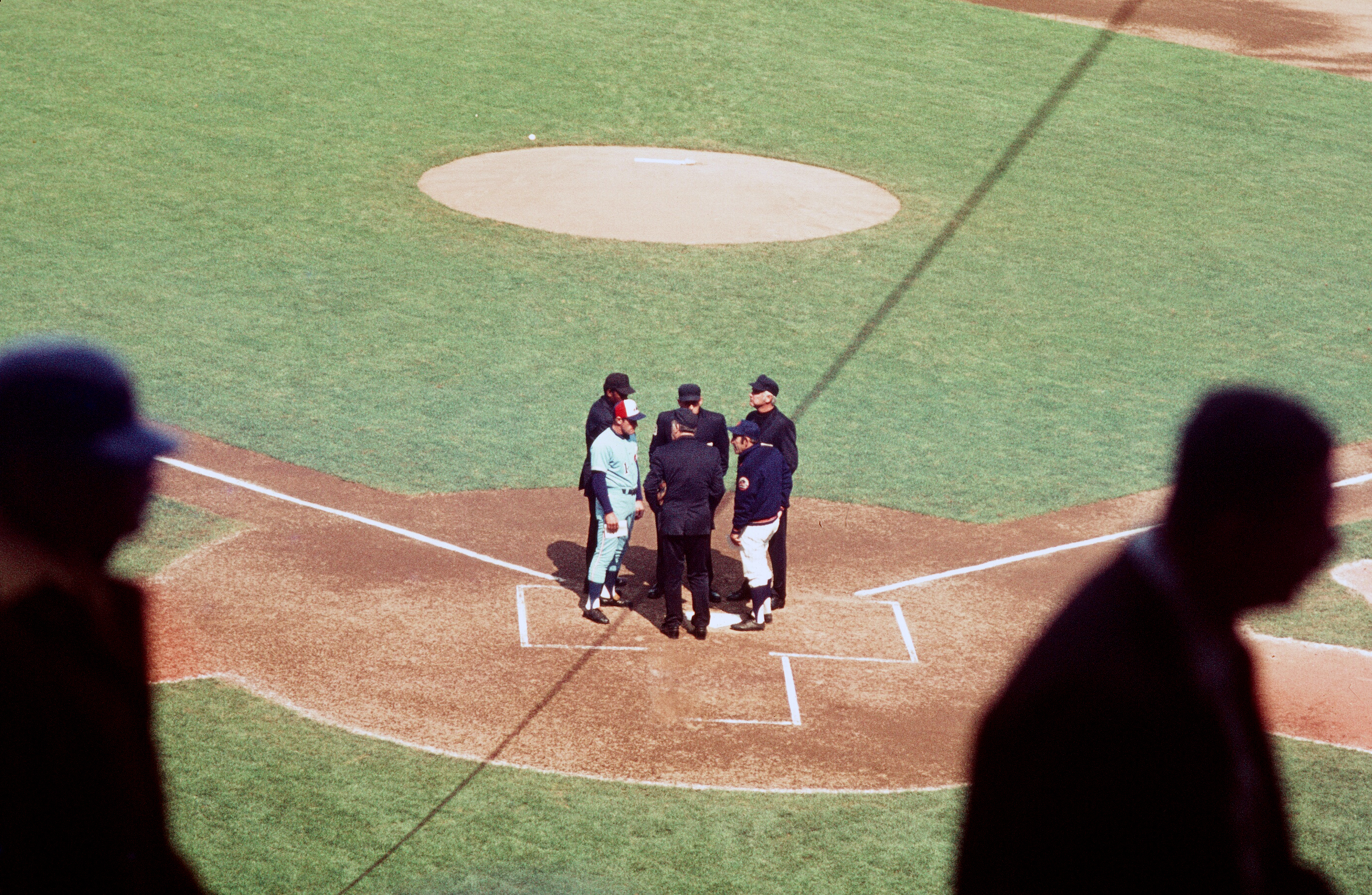
Mauch (left) managing the Montreal Expos in July 1969 at Shea Stadium, New York.

In 1969, Mauch became the inaugural manager of the Montreal Expos. In their first season, the team went 52–110. It was his second and last season managing a team with over 100 losses, while finishing in last place in the NL East. While the team finished in last the following year, they went 73–89, a 21-game improvement. Over the next five seasons, the Expos did not finish in last place, managing to win 70 games or more each season, though their best finish was 4th in 1973 and 1974, finishing 3 1/2 behind the New York Mets in the former and 8 1/2 behind the Pittsburgh Pirates in the latter. On April 23, 1974, the Expos beat the San Francisco Giants to win Mauch's 1,000th game as a manager. The Expos won 79 games in both years, though they did not finish above .500. After the team finished 75–87 in 1975, Mauch was fired by the Expos.

=== Minnesota Twins ===
In 1976, Minnesota Twins owner Calvin Griffith hired Mauch to manage his team, which had Rod Carew at the time. He guided the Twins to an 85–77 that year, good enough for third place in the American League West, five games behind the Kansas City Royals. Despite having just one win fewer the following season, the Twins finished fourth, this time 17 1/2 games behind the Royals. The team plummeted to a 73–89 record in 1978, though they went 82–80 the following year, finishing fourth in both years. Mauch resigned during the following season, with the team at 54–71 (the team would finish at 77–84).

=== California Angels ===
1985 shot of Mauch as manager of the California Angels

Mauch took over during the strike shortened 1981 season for the California Angels. He went 29–34, while the team overall finished 51–59. In 1982, his Angels team won the American League's Western Division after going 93–69. The Angels won the first two games in Anaheim in a best-of-5 ALCS against the Milwaukee Brewers. The Angels needed only one more victory to advance to their first World Series. Chances were great, since no team had ever lost the ALCS after winning the first two games. But Milwaukee came back to win all three remaining games (in Milwaukee) and the AL pennant. Some blamed Mauch, who chose to start Tommy John and Bruce Kison, winners of the first two games, in Games 4 and 5 on three days' rest each. John thought it was not a bad idea, but he noted that by waiting until after California lost Game 3 to announce the strategy, Mauch made it look like he was panicking. Mauch was replaced by John McNamara before being hired back in 1985.

In Mauch's return to managing the Angels in 1985, they finished 90–72, finishing one game behind the Kansas City Royals after being eliminated on the second to last day of the season.

In 1986, the Angels again won the Western title after going 92–70, and led in the fifth game of the (by now best-of-7) ALCS against the Boston Red Sox, just one strike away from the Fall Classic, but Boston's Dave Henderson hit a home run off Angels reliever Donnie Moore to put the Red Sox ahead. The Angels tied the game in the bottom of the 9th, but the Red Sox went on to win the game in extra innings as well as the remaining two games in Boston to take the Series, and denied Mauch his last real chance to win a pennant and a World Series championship.

The following year, the Angels went 75–87 along with a 7th-place finish (10 games back of the Minnesota Twins). Mauch suddenly retired for health reasons as manager of the Angels during spring training in 1988 at age 62. The team's advance scout, Cookie Rojas, who had played for Mauch with the Phillies, took command of the club. Seven years after his retirement as a manager, Mauch returned in 1995 as bench coach with the Kansas City Royals to assist Bob Boone, who was in his first year as a big league skipper.

=== Losing streaks ===
Compounding his ill-starred reputation as a manager, he was the skipper during two of the longest losing streaks in Major League history. His 1961 Phillies lost 23 in a row, one short of the Major League record. His expansion 1969 Expos lost 20 in a row before finally ending it, as Mauch had to endure media reminders of his teams' previous loss streaks in 1961 and 1964.

=== Legacy ===
Writing in 1980, fellow manager Alvin Dark called Mauch "the best manager in baseball today", praising the fact that "he's an active manager and a great competitor". Dark particularly admired Mauch's ability to encourage players that were not doing well, or reprimand a star player if necessary. Tommy John noted that he "knew the baseball rule book better than anyone in baseball," calling him a "brilliant strategist" and "one of the most astute bench managers I ever saw." However, John also noted that "he never won a pennant because he didn't understand pitching." Mauch thought a pitcher could easily be replaced with a pitching machine.

Mauch ultimately served as a manager in 26 seasons (with 24 as full-time manager), and he had a winning record in twelve of those seasons. On July 27, 1987, he lost his 2,000th game as a manager, becoming the third manager to ever do so (since then, three more managers have joined him). As of the end of the 2023 season, Mauch has the fifth-most losses (2,037) as a manager, while ranking 15th in wins (1,902) and tenth in games managed (3,942).

He managed his nephew Roy Smalley III during his tenure with the Minnesota Twins. Smalley's father, Roy Jr., married Mauch's sister, Jolene. Roy Jr. and Mauch grew up and played sandlot baseball together in Los Angeles, California.

== Managerial record ==
Team	Year	Regular season					Postseason			
Team	Year	Games	Won	Lost	Win %	Finish	Won	Lost	Win %	Result
PHI	1960	154	58	94	.382	8th in NL	–	–	–	–
PHI	1961	155	47	107	.305	8th in NL	–	–	–	–
PHI	1962	161	81	80	.503	7th in NL	–	–	–	–
PHI	1963	162	87	75	.537	4th in NL	–	–	–	–
PHI	1964	162	92	70	.568	2nd in NL	–	–	–	–
PHI	1965	162	85	76	.528	6th in NL	–	–	–	–
PHI	1966	162	87	75	.537	4th in NL	–	–	–	–
PHI	1967	162	82	80	.506	5th in NL	–	–	–	–
PHI	1968	54	27	27	.500	(fired)	–	–	–	–
PHI total		1,332	646	684	.486		–	–	–	–
MTL	1969	162	52	110	.321	6th in NL East	–	–	–	–
MTL	1970	162	73	89	.451	6th in NL East	–	–	–	–
MTL	1971	162	71	90	.441	5th in NL East	–	–	–	–
MTL	1972	156	70	86	.449	5th in NL East	–	–	–	–
MTL	1973	162	79	83	.488	4th in NL East	–	–	–	–
MTL	1974	162	79	82	.491	4th in NL East	–	–	–	–
MTL	1975	162	75	87	.463	6th in NL East	–	–	–	–
MTL total		1,127	499	627	.443		–	–	–	–
MIN	1976	162	85	77	.525	3rd in AL West	–	–	–	–
MIN	1977	161	84	77	.522	4th in AL West	–	–	–	–
MIN	1978	162	73	89	.451	4th in AL West	–	–	–	–
MIN	1979	162	82	80	.506	4th in AL West	–	–	–	–
MIN	1980	125	54	71	.432	(resigned)	–	–	–	–
MIN total		772	378	394	.490		–	–	–	–
CAL	1981	13	9	4	.692	4th in AL West	–	–	–	–
CAL	1981	50	20	30	.400	7th in AL West	–	–	–	–
CAL	1982	162	93	69	.574	1st in AL West	2	3	.400	Lost ALCS (MIL)
CAL	1985	162	90	72	.556	2nd in AL West	–	–	–	–
CAL	1986	162	92	70	.568	1st in AL West	3	4	.429	Lost ALCS (BOS)
CAL	1987	162	75	87	.463	6th in AL West	–	–	–	–
CAL total		711	379	332	.533		5	7	.417	
Total		3,942	1,902	2,037	.483		5	7	.417	

== Death ==
After retiring from baseball, Mauch lived in a desert community in California. Mauch died at age 79 at Eisenhower Medical Center in Rancho Mirage, California, from lung cancer.

== See also ==
- List of Major League Baseball managers with most career ejections
- List of Major League Baseball managerial wins and winning percentage leaders

Sporting positions
Preceded by Dixie Walker	Atlanta Crackers manager 1953	Succeeded by Whit Wyatt
Preceded by Red Davis	Minneapolis Millers manager 1958–1959	Succeeded by Eddie Popowski
