= 2002 Major League Baseball postseason =

2002 Major League Baseball playoffs

Tournament details
- Dates: October 1–27, 2002
- Teams: 8

Final positions
- Champions: Anaheim Angels (1st title)
- Runners-up: San Francisco Giants

Tournament statistics
- Most HRs: Barry Bonds (SF) (8)
- Most SBs: Kenny Lofton (SF) (5)
- Most Ks (as pitcher): Francisco Rodríguez (ANA) (28)

Awards
- MVP: Troy Glaus (ANA)

The 2002 Major League Baseball postseason was the playoff tournament of Major League Baseball for the 2002 season. The winners of the League Division Series would move on to the League Championship Series to determine the pennant winners that face each other in the World Series.

In the American League, the Anaheim Angels, formerly known as the California Angels, returned to the postseason for the first time since 1986. Joining them were the New York Yankees, who made their eighth straight postseason appearance, the Oakland Athletics, who returned for the third year in a row, and the Minnesota Twins, who made their first appearance since 1991.

In the National League, the San Francisco Giants returned for the second time in three years, the Arizona Diamondbacks returned for the third time in four years, the St. Louis Cardinals returned for the third straight time, and the Atlanta Braves made their eleventh consecutive appearance.

The postseason began on October 1, 2002, and ended on October 27, 2002, with the Angels defeating the Giants in seven games in the 2002 World Series to win their first World Series title in franchise history. This was the first World Series to feature both Wild Card teams from the American and National Leagues. It was also the last World Series to feature teams from the same state.

This was the first edition of the postseason to have no extra-inning games played, a phenomenon that has only occurred once since, in 2006.

== Playoff seeds ==
American League Teams National League Teams

The following teams qualified for the postseason:

=== American League ===
1. New York Yankees – 103–58, AL East champions
2. Oakland Athletics – 103–59, AL West champions
3. Minnesota Twins – 94–67, AL Central champions
4. Anaheim Angels – 99–63

=== National League ===
1. Atlanta Braves – 101–59, NL East champions
2. Arizona Diamondbacks – 98–64, NL West champions
3. St. Louis Cardinals – 97–65, NL Central champions
4. San Francisco Giants – 95–66

== Playoff bracket ==
Division Series (ALDS, NLDS)
1	NY Yankees	1
4	Anaheim	3
American League
2	Oakland	2
3	Minnesota	3
1	Atlanta	2
4	San Francisco	3
National League
2	Arizona	0
3	St. Louis	3

League Championship Series (NLCS, ALCS)
4	Anaheim	4
3	Minnesota	1
4	San Francisco	4
3	St. Louis	1

World Series
AL4	Anaheim	4
NL4	San Francisco	3

== American League Division Series ==
=== (1) New York Yankees vs. (4) Anaheim Angels ===
Anaheim won the series, 3–1.

Game	Date	Score	Location	Time	Attendance
1	October 1	Anaheim Angels – 5, New York Yankees – 8	Yankee Stadium (I)	3:27	56,710
2	October 2	Anaheim Angels – 8, New York Yankees – 6	Yankee Stadium (I)	4:11	56,695
3	October 4	New York Yankees – 6, Anaheim Angels – 9	Edison International Field of Anaheim	3:52	45,072
4	October 5	New York Yankees – 5, Anaheim Angels – 9	Edison International Field of Anaheim	3:37	45,067

This was the first postseason meeting between the Angels and Yankees. The Angels knocked off the four-time defending American League champion Yankees in four games to reach the ALCS for the first time since 1986.

This was the first playoff series win in franchise history for the Angels. The Yankees took Game 1, as they prevailed in an offensive slugfest by an 8–5 score thanks to home runs from Derek Jeter, Jason Giambi, Rondell White, and Bernie Williams respectively. Game 2 was yet another offensive showdown between both teams, however the Angels would narrowly emerge victorious by an 8–6 score, thanks to home runs from Tim Salmon, Scott Spiezio, Garret Anderson, and Troy Glaus respectively. When the series shifted to Anaheim, the Yankees jumped out to a 6–1 lead after the top of the third, however the Angels scored eight unanswered runs to come from behind and win by a 9–6 score. In Game 4, the Yankees led 2–1 after the top of the fifth, but the Angels again rallied with eight runs in the bottom of the fifth to take a lead they would not relinquish, as they won 9–5, ending the Yankees' bid for a fifth straight AL pennant.

Both teams would meet again in the ALDS in 2005 and the ALCS in 2009, with the Angels winning the former and the Yankees winning the latter en route to a World Series title.

=== (2) Oakland Athletics vs. (3) Minnesota Twins ===
Minnesota won the series, 3–2.

Game	Date	Score	Location	Time	Attendance
1	October 1	Minnesota Twins – 7, Oakland Athletics – 5	Network Associates Coliseum	3:44	34,853
2	October 2	Minnesota Twins – 1, Oakland Athletics – 9	Network Associates Coliseum	3:04	31,953
3	October 4	Oakland Athletics – 6, Minnesota Twins – 3	Hubert H. Humphrey Metrodome	3:26	55,932
4	October 5	Oakland Athletics – 2, Minnesota Twins – 11	Hubert H. Humphrey Metrodome	3:20	55,960
5	October 6	Minnesota Twins – 5, Oakland Athletics – 4	Network Associates Coliseum	3:23	32,146

This was the first postseason meeting between the Twins and Athletics. The Twins defeated the Athletics in five games to return to the ALCS for the first time since 1991.

In Game 1, the Twins prevailed in an offensive slugfest. In Game 2, the A's offense got the best of Twins' starter Joe Mays as they prevailed in a blowout win to even the series headed to Minneapolis. In Game 3, the Athletics won 6–3 to take the series lead, thanks to home runs from Ray Durham, Scott Hatteberg, Terrance Long, and Jermaine Dye respectively. In Game 4, Eric Milton pitched seven solid innings as the Twins blew out the Athletics to force a decisive fifth game back in Oakland. In Game 5, with the Twins leading 5–1 and one out away from advancing, the Athletics mounted a furious comeback as Mark Ellis hit a three-run homer to cut the Twins’ lead to one. However, the Athletics fouled out to end the series two batters later. This was the first playoff series won by the Twins since the 1991 World Series.

Both teams would meet again in the ALDS in 2006, which the Athletics won in a sweep.

This was the last time the Twins won a playoff series until 2023. As of 2026, this remains the Twins’ only LDS series win.

== National League Division Series ==
=== (1) Atlanta Braves vs. (4) San Francisco Giants ===
San Francisco won the series, 3–2.

Game	Date	Score	Location	Time	Attendance
1	October 2	San Francisco Giants – 8, Atlanta Braves – 5	Turner Field	3:24	41,903
2	October 3	San Francisco Giants – 3, Atlanta Braves – 7	Turner Field	2:58	47,167
3	October 5	Atlanta Braves – 10, San Francisco Giants – 2	Pacific Bell Park	3:23	43,043
4	October 6	Atlanta Braves – 3, San Francisco Giants – 8	Pacific Bell Park	3:03	43,070
5	October 7	San Francisco Giants – 3, Atlanta Braves – 1	Turner Field	3:47	45,203

This was the first postseason meeting between the Giants and Braves. The Giants knocked off the top-seeded Braves in five games to advance to the NLCS for the first time since 1989.

Game 1 was an offensive slugfest that was won by the Giants. In Game 2, back-to-back homers from Javy López and Vinny Castilla in the bottom of the second gave the Braves a lead they wouldn’t let go of as they evened the series headed to San Francisco. In Game 3, Greg Maddux pitched six solid innings as the Braves blew out the Giants to take a 2–1 series lead. Liván Hernández pitched eight solid innings as the Giants blew out the Braves to force a decisive fifth game back in Atlanta. Russ Ortiz out-dueled Kevin Millwood as the Giants won the series with a 3–1 victory. The loss to the Giants marked the start of a chain of playoff series losses for the Braves that did not end until 2020.

Both teams would meet again in the NLDS in 2010, which the Giants also won en route to a World Series title.

=== (2) Arizona Diamondbacks vs. (3) St. Louis Cardinals ===
St. Louis won the series, 3–0.

Game	Date	Score	Location	Time	Attendance
1	October 1	St. Louis Cardinals – 12, Arizona Diamondbacks – 2	Bank One Ballpark	2:55	49,154
2	October 3	St. Louis Cardinals – 2, Arizona Diamondbacks – 1	Bank One Ballpark	2:55	48,856
3	October 5	Arizona Diamondbacks – 3, St. Louis Cardinals – 6	Busch Stadium (II)	3:57	52,189

This was the second straight postseason meeting between the Cardinals and Diamondbacks. They met in the NLDS the previous year, which the Diamondbacks won in five games en route to a World Series title. The Cardinals swept the defending World Series champion Diamondbacks to advance to the NLCS for the second time in three years.

In Phoenix for Game 1, things got ugly for the Diamondbacks fast, as St. Louis' Matt Morris outdueled Cy Young winner Randy Johnson in a 12–2 blowout win for the Cardinals. In Game 2, the Cardinals held off a potential rally by the Diamondbacks to win 2–1, thanks to stellar pitching from relief pitcher Jason Isringhausen. When the series shifted to St. Louis, the Cardinals completed the sweep with a 6–3 victory in Game 3.

== American League Championship Series ==
=== (3) Minnesota Twins vs. (4) Anaheim Angels ===
Anaheim won the series, 4–1.

Game	Date	Score	Location	Time	Attendance
1	October 8	Anaheim Angels – 1, Minnesota Twins – 2	Hubert H. Humphrey Metrodome	2:58	55,562
2	October 9	Anaheim Angels – 6, Minnesota Twins – 3	Hubert H. Humphrey Metrodome	3:13	55,990
3	October 11	Minnesota Twins – 1, Anaheim Angels – 2	Edison International Field of Anaheim	3:13	44,234
4	October 12	Minnesota Twins – 1, Anaheim Angels – 7	Edison International Field of Anaheim	2:49	44,830
5	October 13	Minnesota Twins – 5, Anaheim Angels – 13	Edison International Field of Anaheim	3:30	44,835

This was the first ALCS since 1993 to not feature either the New York Yankees, Cleveland Indians or Seattle Mariners.

After three previous defeats, the Angels finally broke through, defeating the Twins in five games to advance to the World Series for the first time in franchise history (in the process denying a rematch of the 1933 World Series between the Giants and Twins (who were then known as the Washington Senators)).

Minnesota's Joe Mays out-dueled Anaheim's Kevin Appier in a tight Twins' victory in Game 1. In Game 2, the Angels jumped out to a big lead early thanks to home runs from Darin Erstad and Brad Fullmer and held on to win 6–3 to even the series headed to Anaheim. Troy Glaus led the Angels to victory in Game 3 with a solo home run in the bottom of the eighth. Game 4 started off as a pitchers' duel between John Lackey and Brad Radke, but things then got ugly for the Twins as the Angels' offense came alive in the bottom of the seventh, and they blew out the Twins to take a 3–1 series lead. In Game 5, the Angels blew out the Twins again to clinch the pennant, a game which was notable for Adam Kennedy's three home runs and the Angels scoring ten runs in the bottom of the seventh.

While the Angels and Twins experienced regular-season success in the following years, 2002 marked a high point for both franchises. As of 2026, this is the last postseason appearance outside of the divisional round for the Twins. After the series loss, the Twins would go on to win the American League Central in three of the next four seasons, although they would lose in the ALDS each time. In 2020, the Twins set a mark of postseason futility when they lost their 18th straight playoff game, setting a record for major professional sports in North America.

As of 2026, this is the only time the Angels won the AL pennant. They would return to the ALCS in 2005, but lost to the eventual World Series champion Chicago White Sox in five games, who won their first pennant in 46 years.

== National League Championship Series ==
=== (3) St. Louis Cardinals vs. (4) San Francisco Giants ===
San Francisco won the series, 4–1.

Game	Date	Score	Location	Time	Attendance
1	October 9	San Francisco Giants – 9, St. Louis Cardinals – 6	Busch Stadium (II)	3:31	52,175
2	October 10	San Francisco Giants – 4, St. Louis Cardinals – 1	Busch Stadium (II)	3:17	52,195
3	October 12	St. Louis Cardinals – 5, San Francisco Giants – 4	Pacific Bell Park	3:32	42,177
4	October 13	St. Louis Cardinals – 3, San Francisco Giants – 4	Pacific Bell Park	3:26	42,676
5	October 14	St. Louis Cardinals – 1, San Francisco Giants – 2	Pacific Bell Park	3:01	42,673

This was a rematch of the 1987 NLCS, which the Cardinals won in seven games before falling in the World Series. This time, the Giants returned the favor and defeated the Cardinals in five games, advancing to the World Series for the first time since 1989.

Game 1 was an offensive slugfest that was won by the Giants, capped off by a two-run homer by Benito Santiago in the top of the sixth. Jason Schmidt pitched seven innings of shutout ball as the Giants prevailed to take a 2-0 series lead headed to San Francisco. In Game 3, the Cardinals staved off a sweep thanks to a solo home run from Eli Marrero in the sixth inning which put them ahead for good. The Cardinals attempted to tie the series with a late rally in Game 4, but Giants closer Robb Nen struck out Albert Pujols and J.D. Drew to put the Giants up 3–1 in the series. Game 5 was a pitchers’ duel that saw both teams go through their bullpens, which saw the game go into the bottom of the ninth, where Kenny Lofton won the pennant for the Giants with a walk-off RBI single.

The Giants would win their next pennant in 2010 against the Philadelphia Phillies in six games en route to a World Series victory, which marked the start of a dynasty for the team.

The Cardinals returned to the NLCS two years later, and defeated the Houston Astros in seven games after being ten outs away from elimination in Game 7, but would fall in the World Series.

The Cardinals and Giants would meet in the NLCS again, in 2012 and 2014, and both times the Giants won en route to winning the World Series.

== 2002 World Series ==
=== (AL4) Anaheim Angels vs. (NL4) San Francisco Giants ===
Anaheim won the series, 4–3.

Game	Date	Score	Location	Time	Attendance
1	October 19	San Francisco Giants – 4, Anaheim Angels – 3	Edison International Field of Anaheim	3:44	44,603
2	October 20	San Francisco Giants – 10, Anaheim Angels – 11	Edison International Field of Anaheim	3:57	44,584
3	October 22	Anaheim Angels – 10, San Francisco Giants – 4	Pacific Bell Park	3:37	42,707
4	October 23	Anaheim Angels – 3, San Francisco Giants – 4	Pacific Bell Park	3:02	42,703
5	October 24	Anaheim Angels – 4, San Francisco Giants – 16	Pacific Bell Park	3:53	42,713
6	October 26	San Francisco Giants – 5, Anaheim Angels – 6	Edison International Field of Anaheim	3:48	44,506
7	October 27	San Francisco Giants – 1, Anaheim Angels – 4	Edison International Field of Anaheim	3:16	44,598

This was the first of six consecutive World Series to feature at least one Wild Card team. This was the first to feature two Wild Card teams, a phenomenon that would repeat twice since - in 2014 - another World Series that featured the Giants, and 2023.

This was the fourth all-California World Series (1974, 1988, 1989) and the last to feature two teams from the same state. It was also the third World Series between the San Francisco Bay Area and the Greater Los Angeles area (1974, 1988). In what is considered to be one of the greatest World Series ever played, the Angels defeated the Giants in seven games to win their first (and only) title in franchise history.

The Giants stole Game 1 on the road thanks to home runs from Barry Bonds, Reggie Sanders, and J.T. Snow. In Game 2, the Angels prevailed in a massive back-and-forth slugfest by an 11–10 score to even the series headed to San Francisco. In Game 3, the Angels blew out the Giants to go up 2–1 in the series as Ramón Ortiz got the best of Liván Hernández. In Game 4, the Angels lead 3-0 after the fourth inning, but the Giants put up four unanswered runs to even the series. In Game 5, the Giants embarrassed the Angels in a 16–4 blowout to take a 3-2 series lead headed back to Anaheim, now one win away from their first title in 48 years.

Game 6 became famous for a late rally by the Angels - the Giants jumped out to a 5-0 lead going into the bottom of the seventh, where the Angels cut their lead to two thanks to a three-run homer by Scott Spiezio. Then in the bottom of the eighth, with the Giants six outs away from the championship, the Angels put up three more unanswered runs to take the lead for good, capped off by a two-run RBI double from Troy Glaus, and they never looked back. The Angels’ comeback from five runs down set a World Series record for the largest comeback in an elimination game.

In Game 7, with the game tied after two innings, the Angels took the lead for good with a three-run RBI double from Garret Anderson in the bottom of the third, and the strong Angels bullpen led by closer Troy Percival closed out the series in the top of the ninth despite putting two runners on base. The Angels made MLB history in Game 7 as John Lackey became the first rookie pitcher to win a World Series Game 7 since Babe Adams did so in 1909. This was the first Game 7 ever won by the Angels in franchise history.

Due to the Angels claiming the championship in Game 7, the Game 6 collapse entered baseball lore as part of the Curse of Coogan's Bluff superstition used to explain the Giants' championship drought after the 1954 World Series. As of 2026, this is the last time the Giants lost in the World Series. They would eventually break through in 2010, where they defeated the Texas Rangers in five games to end the curse and began a dynasty.

As of 2026, this remains the Angels’ only World Series victory and appearance, and they remain the most recent American League team to win Game 7 of the World Series at home. Along with the Los Angeles Lakers winning the 2002 NBA Finals, the Greater Los Angeles area had NBA and World Series champions in the same season or calendar year for the first time since the Dodgers and Lakers did so in 1988.

In 2020, ESPN rated the 2002 World Series as the 22nd greatest Fall Classic of all time.

== Broadcasting ==
This was the only postseason in which Division Series games aired across ABC Family, Fox, and Fox's sister network FX in the United States. After Fox sold Fox Family to ESPN's parent company Disney in November 2001, and rebranded it as ABC Family, it was decided that the channel could still air selected Division Games in 2002. The ABC Family broadcasts were ESPN-produced telecasts. After the season, ABC Family's rights for selected Division Series games were transferred to ESPN proper.

Both League Championship Series and the World Series aired on Fox.
