= 2002 National League Championship Series =

Major League Baseball playoff series

Team (Wins)	Managers	Season
San Francisco Giants (4)	Dusty Baker	95–66 (.590), GB: 2 1/2
St. Louis Cardinals (1)	Tony La Russa	97–65 (.599), GA: 13
- Dates: October 9–14
- MVP: Benito Santiago (San Francisco)
- Umpires: Randy Marsh, Jeff Nelson, Dale Scott, Jeff Kellogg, Tim Welke, Charlie Reliford

Broadcast
- Television: Fox
- TV announcers: Joe Buck and Tim McCarver
- Radio: ESPN
- Radio announcers: Dan Shulman and Dave Campbell
- NLDS: San Francisco Giants over Atlanta Braves (3–2); St. Louis Cardinals over Arizona Diamondbacks (3–0)

The 2002 National League Championship Series (NLCS) was a best-of-seven playoff series in Major League Baseball’s 2002 postseason pitting the third-seeded St. Louis Cardinals against the fourth-seeded San Francisco Giants for the National League pennant. The Series began October 9 and ended on October 14. The Cardinals held home-field advantage by virtue of having a better regular season record.

It was a rematch of the 1987 NLCS, in which the Cardinals defeated the Giants in seven games.

The Giants won the series in five games but were defeated by the Anaheim Angels in seven games in the World Series.

== Summary ==
=== St. Louis Cardinals vs. San Francisco Giants ===
San Francisco won the series, 4–1.

Game	Date	Score	Location	Time	Attendance
1	October 9	San Francisco Giants – 9, St. Louis Cardinals – 6	Busch Stadium (II)	3:31	52,175
2	October 10	San Francisco Giants – 4, St. Louis Cardinals – 1	Busch Stadium (II)	3:17	52,195
3	October 12	St. Louis Cardinals – 5, San Francisco Giants – 4	Pacific Bell Park	3:32	42,177
4	October 13	St. Louis Cardinals – 3, San Francisco Giants – 4	Pacific Bell Park	3:26	42,676
5	October 14	St. Louis Cardinals – 1, San Francisco Giants – 2	Pacific Bell Park	3:01	42,673

== Game summaries ==
=== Game 1 ===
October 9, 2002 7:24 pm (CDT) at Busch Stadium (II) in St. Louis, Missouri 67 °F (19 °C), cloudy
Team	1	2	3	4	5	6	7	8	9	R	H	E
San Francisco	1	4	1	0	1	2	0	0	0	9	11	0
St. Louis	0	1	0	0	2	2	0	1	0	6	11	0
WP: Kirk Rueter (1–0) LP: Matt Morris (0–1) Sv: Robb Nen (1); Home runs: SF: Kenny Lofton (1), David Bell (1), Benito Santiago (1); STL: Albert Pujols (1), Miguel Cairo (1), J. D. Drew (1); Attendance: 52,175; Boxscore

The Giants struck first in Game 1 off Matt Morris with two on via Benito Santiago's RBI single to score Kenny Lofton from second. Next inning, Morris struck out David Bell and Kirk Rueter, but then gave up four runs before finally retiring Reggie Sanders. Lofton singled, stole second, and scored on Rich Aurilia's RBI single. After Jeff Kent singled, Barry Bonds's two-run triple scored Aurilia and Kent before Bonds scored on Santiago's RBI single, giving the Giants an early 5−0 lead. The Cardinals got on the board in the bottom of the inning off Rueter on Fernando Viña's RBI groundout with runners on second and third, but solo home runs by Lofton in the third and Bell in the fifth off Morris gave the Giants a 7−1 lead. Albert Pujols hit a two-run home run in the bottom of the fifth off Rueter cutting the Giants' lead to 7−3, but the Giants got those runs back in the sixth on Santiago's two-run home run off Mike Crudale. The Cardinals cut the lead to 9−5 on Miguel Cairo's two-run home run in the bottom of the inning, then made it 9−6 on J.D. Drew's home run in the eighth off Tim Worrell, but Robb Nen pitched a scoreless ninth for the save as the Giants went up 1−0 in the series.

=== Game 2 ===
October 10, 2002 7:22 pm (CDT) at Busch Stadium (II) in St. Louis, Missouri 70 °F (21 °C), cloudy
Team	1	2	3	4	5	6	7	8	9	R	H	E
San Francisco	1	0	0	0	2	0	0	0	1	4	7	0
St. Louis	0	0	0	0	0	0	0	1	0	1	6	0
WP: Jason Schmidt (1–0) LP: Woody Williams (0–1) Sv: Robb Nen (2); Home runs: SF: Rich Aurilia 2 (2); STL: Eduardo Pérez (1); Attendance: 52,195; Boxscore

In Game 2, the Giants went up 1−0 on Rich Aurilia's home run in the first off Woody Williams. His two-run home run in the fifth made it 3−0, also off Williams. Those were the only runs Williams allowed in six solid innings, but Giants starter Jason Schmidt pitched 7 2/3 shutout innings before allowing Eduardo Pérez's home run in the eighth for the only run the Cardinals would score. The Giants added a run in the ninth on Ramón Martínez's groundout off Jason Isringhausen with runners on first and third while Robb Nen pitched a scoreless bottom of the inning for his second consecutive save. The Giants went up 2−0 in the series heading to San Francisco.

=== Game 3 ===
October 12, 2002 4:30 pm (PDT) at Pacific Bell Park in San Francisco, California 70 °F (21 °C), sunny
Team	1	2	3	4	5	6	7	8	9	R	H	E
St. Louis	0	0	2	1	1	1	0	0	0	5	6	1
San Francisco	0	1	0	0	3	0	0	0	0	4	10	0
WP: Chuck Finley (1–0) LP: Jay Witasick (0–1) Sv: Jason Isringhausen (1); Home runs: STL: Mike Matheny (1), Jim Edmonds (1), Eli Marrero (1); SF: Barry Bonds (1); Attendance: 42,177; Boxscore

In Game 3, the Giants loaded the bases in the second with no outs off Chuck Finley, but only scored once on Rich Aurilia's sacrifice fly. The Cardinals responded in the third off Russ Ortiz with Édgar Rentería's sacrifice fly and Jim Edmonds' RBI groundout scoring a run each after managing to put runners on second and third. They extended their lead to 4−1 on solo home runs by Mike Matheny in the fourth and Edmonds in the fifth, but Barry Bonds' three-run "splash hit" home run into McCovey Cove in the fifth tied the game, 4−4. This was the first (and, so far, only) time a Giants player had recorded a "splash hit" in the postseason. In the sixth, Eli Marrero hit a leadoff home run off Jay Witasick to take back the lead for the Cardinals. In the ninth, Jason Isringhausen walked Bonds with one out, but then retired Benito Santiago and Reggie Sanders to seal the Cardinals' 5−4 win and cut the Giants' series lead to 2−1.

=== Game 4 ===
October 13, 2002 5:00 pm (PDT) at Pacific Bell Park in San Francisco, California 70 °F (21 °C), sunny
Team	1	2	3	4	5	6	7	8	9	R	H	E
St. Louis	2	0	0	0	0	0	0	0	1	3	12	0
San Francisco	0	0	0	0	0	2	0	2	X	4	4	1
WP: Tim Worrell (1–0) LP: Rick White (0–1) Sv: Robb Nen (3); Home runs: STL: None; SF: Benito Santiago (2); Attendance: 42,676; Boxscore

In the first inning of Game 4, the Cardinals took an early 2–0 lead off Liván Hernández, scoring on Jim Edmonds' RBI groundout and Tino Martinez' RBI single. After being held scoreless for the first five innings, the Giants' bats would answer in the sixth, when J. T. Snow hit a game-tying two-run double to score Jeff Kent and Barry Bonds. In the eighth, Benito Santiago would deliver the key blow for San Francisco with a two-run home run following an intentional walk to Bonds. In the ninth, the Cardinals would threaten against Robb Nen, cutting the deficit to 4–3 with Edmonds' RBI single, which put runners at first and third base with one out for slugger Albert Pujols. However, Nen struck out Pujols and J. D. Drew to give the Giants a 3–1 series advantage.

=== Game 5 ===
October 14, 2002 5:20 pm (PDT) at Pacific Bell Park in San Francisco, California 62 °F (17 °C), cloudy
Team	1	2	3	4	5	6	7	8	9	R	H	E
St. Louis	0	0	0	0	0	0	1	0	0	1	9	0
San Francisco	0	0	0	0	0	0	0	1	1	2	7	0
WP: Tim Worrell (2–0) LP: Matt Morris (0–2); Attendance: 42,673; Boxscore

Game 5 was a pitchers' duel between Matt Morris and Kirk Rueter throughout the first six innings as the Giants looked for their first pennant since 1989. The Cardinals got on the board in the seventh with a sacrifice fly by Fernando Viña, but the Giants responded in the eighth with a sacrifice fly by Barry Bonds. In the ninth, Morris retired Ramón Martínez and J.T. Snow before giving up back-to-back singles to David Bell and Shawon Dunston. Steve Kline was then brought in to pitch to Kenny Lofton, who had yelled at the Cardinals dugout earlier after an inside pitch. On the first pitch, Lofton delivered a walk-off RBI single to right field, scoring Bell as J.D. Drew's throw was off-line, giving the Giants their first pennant since 1989.

== Composite line score ==
2002 NLCS (4–1): San Francisco Giants over St. Louis Cardinals

Team	1	2	3	4	5	6	7	8	9	R	H	E
San Francisco Giants	2	5	1	0	6	4	0	3	2	23	39	1
St. Louis Cardinals	2	1	2	1	3	3	1	2	1	16	44	1
Total attendance: 231,896 Average attendance: 46,379

== Aftermath ==
In the Barry Bonds era (1993–2007), the 2002 postseason would be the only October where the Giants experienced a run of team success, let alone win a playoff series (winning two). However, it still did not lead to an elusive World Championship for San Francisco. In the 2002 World Series against the Anaheim Angels, the Giants were eight outs away from winning the Series in Game 6, but late game home runs by Scott Spiezio and Darin Erstad, as well as a two-RBI double by Troy Glaus helped the Angels overcome a five-run, seventh-inning deficit to win. A three-run double by Garret Anderson was the difference in the Angels' Game 7 win to clinch the World Series. In the Series, the two teams set the record for combined runs over the course of the series. The Giants did not win a World Series until 2010.

Despite Dusty Baker's success in San Francisco, he had an increasingly strained relationship with owner Peter Magowan, one that even the Giants' first pennant in thirteen years could not mend. Baker and the Giants mutually parted ways after the season. Baker was not out of work for long as he was quickly snatched up by the Chicago Cubs to become their manager. Baker's Cubs reached the 2003 National League Championship Series, but the team famously fell apart in Game 6 when the Cubs were up 3-0 and five outs from their first World Series appearance in almost 60 years. He would experience success managing the Cincinnati Reds (2010–2013), Washington Nationals (2016–2018), and the Houston Astros (2020–2023) in later years. In 2012, his Reds faced his former team the Giants in the National League Division Series. Like many times before with his previous teams, Baker's Reds fell apart after leading the series 2–0, eventually losing to the Giants in five games. Baker eventually achieved World Series glory as manager, winning a World Series in 2022 with the Astros. He retired the following season at the age of 73, after the Astros lost in the American League Championship Series to the eventual World Series champion Texas Rangers.

The St. Louis Cardinals continued to be a perennial playoff team until 2016, winning two World Championships in 2006 and 2011. Meanwhile, San Francisco began re-tooling their roster after losing a close NL West race to the Dodgers on the last weekend of the season in 2004. They did not make the postseason from 2004 to 2009.

The Giants continued their winning ways in the October against St. Louis, beating them in the 2012 National League Championship Series and the 2014 National League Championship Series, on their way to a World Championship in both seasons. In their 2014 meeting, the Giants again clinched the pennant with a walk-off hit, when outfielder Travis Ishikawa hit a three-run home run off Michael Wacha to send the Giants to the World Series. Overall, it was the third time the Giants clinched a pennant on a walk-off hit, following Kenny Lofton in the 2002 NLCS and Bobby Thompson's Shot Heard' Round The World.

In 2021, Dusty Baker and Tony La Russa would face off again in the American League Division Series. By then, the two men were the oldest managers in MLB at a combined age of 149. Baker's Astros beat La Russa's White Sox in four games on his way to his fourth League Championship Series as manager. He proceeded to win that series, which made him at the age of 72 the second oldest manager to appear in a World Series, with the 19-year gap between pennants being the second longest for a manager in MLB history.
