= 2002 American League Championship Series =

33rd edition of Major League Baseball's American League Championship Series

Team (Wins)	Managers	Season
Anaheim Angels (4)	Mike Scioscia	99–63 (.611), GB: 4
Minnesota Twins (1)	Ron Gardenhire	94–67 (.584), GA: 13 1/2
- Dates: October 8–13
- MVP: Adam Kennedy (Anaheim)
- Umpires: Ed Montague, Mike Everitt, Brian Gorman, Larry Young, Dana DeMuth, Ed Rapuano

Broadcast
- Television: Fox (United States); MLB International (International)
- TV announcers: Thom Brennaman and Steve Lyons (Fox); Gary Thorne and Ken Singleton (MLB International)
- Radio: ESPN
- Radio announcers: Jon Miller and Joe Morgan
- ALDS: Anaheim Angels over New York Yankees (3–1); Minnesota Twins over Oakland Athletics (3–2)

The 2002 American League Championship Series (ALCS) was a best-of-seven playoff series in Major League Baseball’s 2002 postseason pitting the third-seeded Minnesota Twins and the fourth-seeded Anaheim Angels for the American League pennant. The Series began on October 8 and ended on October 13. The Twins held home-field advantage by virtue of winning their division.

The Angels won the Series four games to one and went on to defeat the San Francisco Giants in the 2002 World Series to win their first World Series championship.

== Summary ==
=== Minnesota Twins vs. Anaheim Angels ===
Anaheim won the series, 4–1.

Game	Date	Score	Location	Time	Attendance
1	October 8	Anaheim Angels – 1, Minnesota Twins – 2	Hubert H. Humphrey Metrodome	2:58	55,562
2	October 9	Anaheim Angels – 6, Minnesota Twins – 3	Hubert H. Humphrey Metrodome	3:13	55,990
3	October 11	Minnesota Twins – 1, Anaheim Angels – 2	Edison International Field of Anaheim	3:13	44,234
4	October 12	Minnesota Twins – 1, Anaheim Angels – 7	Edison International Field of Anaheim	2:49	44,830
5	October 13	Minnesota Twins – 5, Anaheim Angels – 13	Edison International Field of Anaheim	3:30	44,835

== Game summaries ==
=== Game 1 ===
October 8, 2002 8:20 pm (CDT) at Hubert H. Humphrey Metrodome in Minneapolis, Minnesota 72 °F (22 °C), dome
Team	1	2	3	4	5	6	7	8	9	R	H	E
Anaheim	0	0	1	0	0	0	0	0	0	1	4	0
Minnesota	0	1	0	0	1	0	0	0	X	2	5	1
WP: Joe Mays (1–0) LP: Kevin Appier (0–1) Sv: Eddie Guardado (1); Attendance: 55,562; Boxscore

Joe Mays outdueled Kevin Appier as the Twins won Game 1. A. J. Pierzynski hit a sacrifice fly with runners on first and third to put the Twins out in front in the second, but in the third, the Angels got back-to-back two-out singles by Adam Kennedy and David Eckstein before shortstop Cristian Guzmán's error on Darin Erstad's ground ball tied the game. The Twins would take a one-run lead when Corey Koskie doubled in a run in the fifth. Though three Angel relievers kept the Twins scoreless for the rest of the game, Mays pitched eight innings Eddie Guardado got the save as the Twins took a 1–0 series lead. Until 2023, this was the last postseason game the Twins won at home.

=== Game 2 ===
October 9, 2002 7:20 pm (CDT) at Hubert H. Humphrey Metrodome in Minneapolis, Minnesota 72 °F (22 °C), dome
Team	1	2	3	4	5	6	7	8	9	R	H	E
Anaheim	1	3	0	0	0	2	0	0	0	6	10	0
Minnesota	0	0	0	0	0	3	0	0	0	3	11	1
WP: Ramón Ortiz (1–0) LP: Rick Reed (0–1) Sv: Troy Percival (1); Home runs: ANA: Darin Erstad (1), Brad Fullmer (1); MIN: None; Attendance: 55,990; Boxscore

The Angels took their first lead in the series when Darin Erstad hit a home run in the first with one out off of Rick Reed. In the second, Troy Glaus hit a leadoff single, then Brad Fullmer doubled before Scott Spiezio's RBI double made it 2–0 Angels. Two outs later, with Spiezio at third and Adam Kennedy at first, Spiezio stole home while Adam Kennedy tried to steal second. He was caught up in the rundown and knocked the ball away from Pierzynski, although no one called interference. Adam Kennedy went to third and would score on David Eckstein's RBI single to make it 4–0 Angels. A two-run homer by Brad Fullmer gave the Angels a six-run lead in the sixth. In the bottom half, Cristian Guzman hit a leadoff double and scored on Corey Koskie's single. After David Ortiz struck out, Torii Hunter doubled before Doug Mientkiewicz's two-run single cut the Angels' lead in half. Neither team would score afterward off each other's bullpen and Troy Percival earned the save as the Angels tied the series heading to Anaheim.

=== Game 3 ===
October 11, 2002 5:20 pm (PDT) at Edison International Field of Anaheim in Anaheim, California 68 °F (20 °C), cloudy
Team	1	2	3	4	5	6	7	8	9	R	H	E
Minnesota	0	0	0	0	0	0	1	0	0	1	6	0
Anaheim	0	1	0	0	0	0	0	1	X	2	7	2
WP: Francisco Rodríguez (1–0) LP: J. C. Romero (0–1) Sv: Troy Percival (2); Home runs: MIN: None; ANA: Garret Anderson (1), Troy Glaus (1); Attendance: 44,234; Boxscore

The third game saw Minnesota send Eric Milton to the mound against Jarrod Washburn for the Angels. The two pitchers dueled for seven innings that saw the teams leave a combined sixteen players on base. Garret Anderson started the scoring by hitting a lead-off home run in the bottom of the second.

The Twins tied the game in the seventh when Dustan Mohr hit a leadoff single and scored on Jacque Jones's two-out double in the seventh; Francisco Rodríguez was sent to relieve Washburn in the eighth inning. In the bottom of the eighth, Troy Glaus hit a lead-off home run off J. C. Romero to put the Angels a 2–1 lead. Troy Percival got the save in the ninth with three perfect outs to give the Angels the lead in the series.

=== Game 4 ===
October 12, 2002 5:15 pm (PDT) at Edison International Field of Anaheim in Anaheim, California 67 °F (19 °C), overcast
Team	1	2	3	4	5	6	7	8	9	R	H	E
Minnesota	0	0	0	0	0	0	0	0	1	1	6	2
Anaheim	0	0	0	0	0	0	2	5	X	7	10	0
WP: John Lackey (1–0) LP: Brad Radke (0–1); Attendance: 44,830; Boxscore

The game remained scoreless into the seventh inning as Brad Radke and John Lackey waged a classic pitcher's duel, but the Angels would strike in the bottom of the seventh. A single, stolen base in combination with an error, and walk put runners on first and third with no outs. After Garret Anderson popped out to third, Troy Glaus's RBI single made it 1–0 Angels. Radke struck out Brad Fullmer, but Scott Spiezio's RBI double made it 2–0 Angels. Next inning, Darin Erstad singled with one out off of Johan Santana, moved to second on an error, and then to third on a groundout by Alex Ochoa before scoring on Anderson's single off of J. C. Romero. Mike Jackson relieved Romero and allowed a single to Glaus before Fullmer's two-run double made it 5–0 Angels. After Spiezio was intentionally walked, Bengie Molina's two-run triple made it 7–0 Angels. Ben Weber in the ninth allowed a two-out double to Corey Koskie and subsequent RBI single to David Ortiz before striking out Torii Hunter to end the game and give the Angels a 3–1 series lead.

=== Game 5 ===
October 13, 2002 1:20 pm (PDT) at Edison International Field of Anaheim in Anaheim, California 72 °F (22 °C), sunny
Team	1	2	3	4	5	6	7	8	9	R	H	E
Minnesota	1	1	0	0	0	0	3	0	0	5	9	0
Anaheim	0	0	1	0	2	0	10	0	X	13	18	0
WP: Francisco Rodríguez (2–0) LP: Johan Santana (0–1); Home runs: MIN: None; ANA: Adam Kennedy 3 (3), Scott Spiezio (1); Attendance: 44,835; Boxscore

Game 1 winner Joe Mays took the mound to try to send the series back to the Metrodome. He was opposed by Kevin Appier and the Twins struck first when Corey Koskie walked with two outs in the first, moved to second on a wild pitch and scored on David Ortiz's double. The next inning, Dustan Mohr doubled with one out and scored on A. J. Pierzynski's single with Pierzynski being tagged out at second, but the lead would be cut in half on an Adam Kennedy home run in the third. In the fifth a leadoff homer by Scott Spiezio and the second home run of the day by Kennedy two batters later made it 3–2 Angels. In the seventh, the Twins loaded the bases on three straight one-out singles by Doug Mientkiewicz, Mohr, and Pierzynski off of Brendan Donnelly, who was relieved by Francisco Rodriguez. Rodriguez walked pinch hitter Bobby Kielty to force in Mientkiewicz, threw a wild pitch to Jacque Jones to score Mohr, and allowed Jones to hit a sacrifice fly to drive in Pierzynski to put the Twins ahead 5–3. In the bottom of the inning, Scott Spezio and Bengie Molina hit consecutive leadoff singles off of Johan Santana before Kennedy's third home run of the game put the Angels back in front 6–5. LaTroy Hawkins relieved Santana and allowed three straight singles to David Eckstein, Darin Erstad, and Tim Salmon to load the bases with no outs. J. C. Romero relieved Hawkins and walked Garret Anderson to force in Eckstein. After Troy Glaus struck out, Shawn Wooten's single scored Erstad, then a wild pitch scored Alex Ochoa (who was pinch-running for Salmon) before Spezio's second single of the inning scored Wooten to make it 11–5 Angels. Bob Wells relieved Romero and allowed two straight singles to Chone Figgins and Kennedy to re-load the bases, then hit Eckstein with a pitch to force in Spiezio before Darin Erstad's groundout scored Figgins for the last run of the inning. Ben Weber and Troy Percival pitched a scoreless eighth and ninth, respectively as the Angels' 13–5 win earned them the American League pennant, their first in franchise history.

== Composite box ==
2002 ALCS (4–1): Anaheim Angels over Minnesota Twins

Team	1	2	3	4	5	6	7	8	9	R	H	E
Anaheim Angels	1	4	2	0	2	2	12	6	0	29	49	2
Minnesota Twins	1	2	0	0	1	3	4	0	1	12	37	4
Total attendance: 245,451 Average attendance: 49,090

== Impact and aftermath ==
The Anaheim Angels would go on to win the World Series against the San Francisco Giants. Within six months, another Anaheim-Minnesota postseason match-up would take place. The Minnesota Wild would face off against the Mighty Ducks of Anaheim in the 2003 Western Conference Final during the Stanley Cup Playoffs. The Mighty Ducks would sweep the Wild to advance to the Stanley Cup Final for the first time in franchise history, before losing to the New Jersey Devils. The Minnesota Twins, despite having lost the American League Championship Series, would go on to win the American League Central in the following two seasons, although they would lose in the American League Division Series both years to the New York Yankees.

This turned out to be the only AL Championship Series between 1998 through 2004 to not feature the Yankees.

While the Angels and Twins experienced regular-season success in the following years, 2002 would mark a high point for both franchises. To date, the Angels have only won two postseason series since 2002, while the Twins did not win another postseason until 2023. In 2020, the Twins set a mark of postseason futility when they lost their 18th straight postseason game, setting a record for major professional sports in North America.

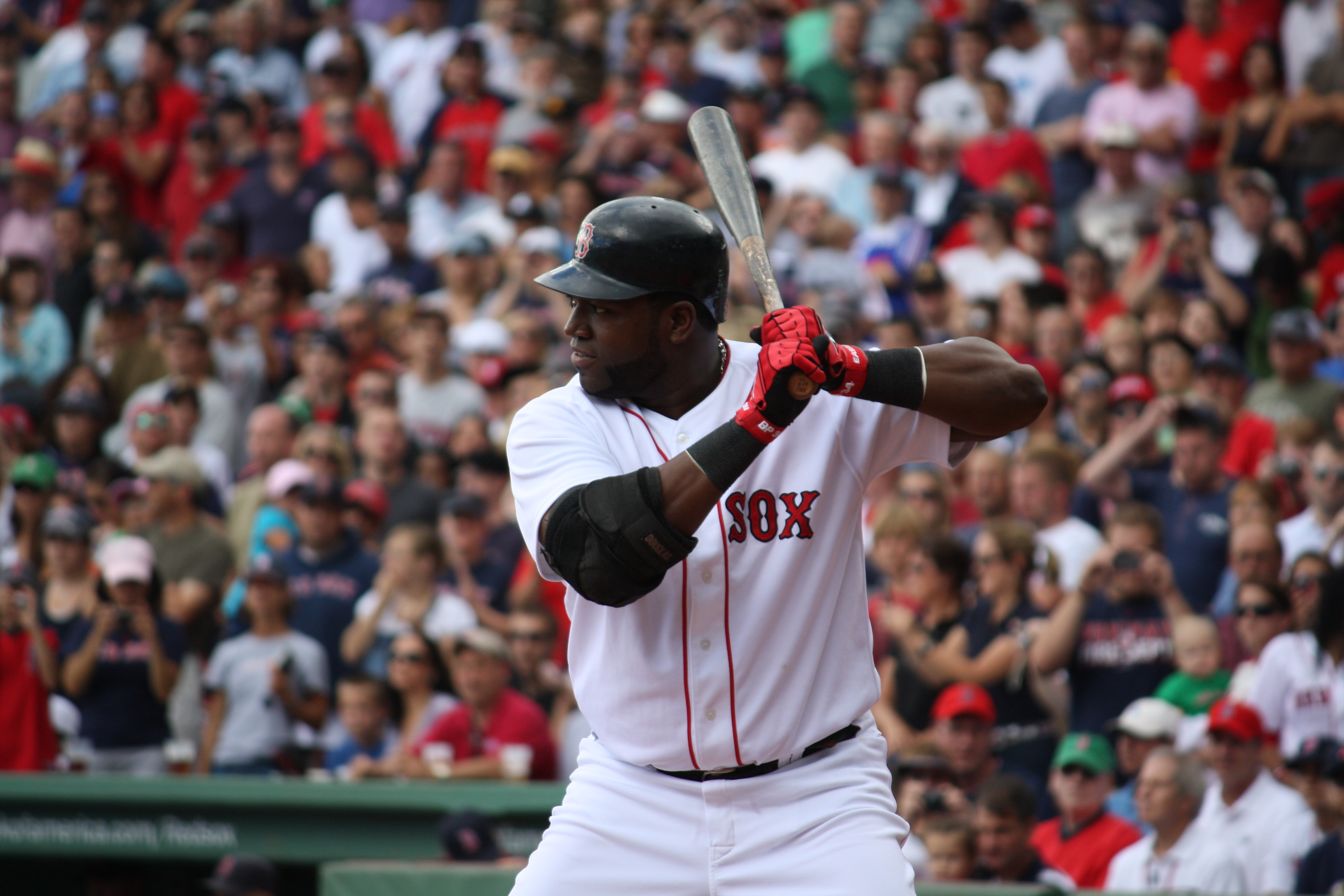
David Ortiz, or 'Big Papi' as a nickname he would later be known by, batting for the Red Sox in 2009

The Twins would infamously release David Ortiz during the off-season as a cost-cutting move on December 16, 2002, after being unable to swing a trade for him. Within a month after his release, Ortiz signed with the Boston Red Sox as a favor to star pitcher Pedro Martinez (Ortiz and Martinez were friends growing up in the Dominican Republic together). This seemingly insignificant signing for Boston turned into one of their best moves in franchise history. Ortiz turned into a hitting superstar for the Red Sox, becoming a 10-time All-Star with seven Silver Slugger Awards at the DH position. In 2004, Ortiz helped the Red Sox break their 86-year drought, providing clutch hits in the League Championship Series against the Yankees. Overall, Ortiz hit in the middle of the line-up for three of Boston's World Series winners (2004, 2007, and 2013). He was elected to the National Baseball Hall of Fame in his first year of eligibility in 2022. Before releasing him in 2003, Ortiz was only due for a roughly $1 million raise, and the player who replaced Ortiz on the Twins' roster, Jose Morban, would never play in a game for the team. Recently, some Twins fans have considered the team cursed due to the decision to release Ortiz in 2002.

After leaving Minnesota in 2007, center fielder Torii Hunter signed a five-year free agent contract with the Angels, where he continued his gold glove work in center field until moving to right field due to age and the emergence of Mike Trout. Hunter returned to the Twins in 2014, which was the last season of his career. He was later inducted into the Minnesota Twins Hall of Fame in 2016.
