= 2002 World Series =

American baseball championship series

Team (Wins)	Managers	Season
Anaheim Angels (4)	Mike Scioscia	99–63 (.611), GB: 4
San Francisco Giants (3)	Dusty Baker	95–66 (.590), GB: 2 1/2
- Dates: October 19–27
- Venue(s): Edison International Field (Anaheim); Pacific Bell Park (San Francisco)
- MVP: Troy Glaus (Anaheim)
- Umpires: Jerry Crawford (crew chief), Ángel Hernández, Tim Tschida, Mike Winters, Mike Reilly, Tim McClelland
- Hall of Famers: Angels: None; Giants: Jeff Kent

Broadcast
- Television: Fox (United States); MLB International (International)
- TV announcers: Joe Buck and Tim McCarver (Fox); Gary Thorne and Ken Singleton (MLB International)
- Radio: ESPN; KLAC (ANA); KNBR (SF)
- Radio announcers: Jon Miller and Joe Morgan (ESPN); Rory Markas and Terry Smith (KLAC); Duane Kuiper, Joe Angel, and Mike Krukow (KNBR)
- ALCS: Anaheim Angels over Minnesota Twins (4–1)
- NLCS: San Francisco Giants over St. Louis Cardinals (4–1)

The 2002 World Series was the championship series of Major League Baseball (MLB)'s 2002 season. The 98th edition of the World Series, it was a best-of-seven playoff between the American League (AL) champion Anaheim Angels and the National League (NL) champion San Francisco Giants; the Angels defeated the Giants in seven games to win their first, and, to date, only World Series championship. This was the first professional sports championship ever won by an Anaheim-based team. The series was played from October 19–27, 2002, at Pacific Bell Park in San Francisco and Edison International Field of Anaheim in Anaheim. It was also the first World Series since 1997 to not feature the New York Yankees.

This was the first World Series since the 1995 inception of the wild card in MLB in which both wild card teams would vie for the title, a phenomenon that has only been repeated twice since, in 2014 and 2023. This was also the fourth all-California World Series, after 1974, 1988, and 1989.

This World Series was notable for its Game 6, where the Giants led 5–0 and were six outs away from winning the championship, but home runs by Scott Spiezio and Darin Erstad, as well as a two-RBI double by Troy Glaus helped the Angels overcome a five-run deficit in the bottom of the eighth to win. The Giants’ Game 6 collapse has been often cited as another manifestation of the Curse of Coogan's Bluff. The two teams set a record for combined most home runs in a World Series (21), which stood until 2017.

As of 2026, this is the only time the Angels made or won the World Series, and is the last time the Giants lost in the World Series.

== Background ==
This was the fourth all-California World Series (1974, 1988, 1989), and the last World Series as of 2026 involving two teams from the same state (since 2000 between cross-town rivals New York Mets and New York Yankees). This was also the third World Series between teams from the Greater Los Angeles area and the San Francisco Bay Area (1974, 1988). This was the first World Series to feature opposing managers who had been teammates on a World Championship team as players.

=== San Francisco Giants ===
Since their 1958 move from New York City to San Francisco, the Giants franchise and its fans had a long history of futility, frustration, and disappointment. The Giants had won their last World Series crown before the move, in 1954. Since the move, the Giants made it to the World Series twice but lost both times. These included a dramatic, down-to-the-wire loss to the New York Yankees in the seven-game classic 1962 World Series, and a four-game sweep by their crosstown rival Oakland Athletics in the 1989 World Series, which was marred by the Loma Prieta earthquake, and what would also be the only all-Bay Area Fall Classic. In addition, the Giants narrowly missed winning the National League pennant in 1959, 1964, 1965, 1966, 1971, and 1987. They also finished in second place five years in a row from 1965 to 1969.

2002 was Dusty Baker's tenth season as manager of the Giants. It was also their third season playing at Pacific Bell Park (now Oracle Park). The Giants finished the previous season with a record of 90–72, finishing in second place in the National League West, two games behind the Arizona Diamondbacks. They also finished in second place in the NL wild card standings, three games behind the St. Louis Cardinals. Notable player departures included 2001 midseason acquisition Andrés Galarraga, who departed as a free agent, and Shawn Estes, who was traded to the New York Mets in exchange for Tsuyoshi Shinjo and Desi Relaford. Notable player acquisitions included Reggie Sanders, a free agent, and David Bell, who the Giants received from the Seattle Mariners in exchange for Desi Relaford and cash. During the season the Giants also acquired Kenny Lofton from the Chicago White Sox in exchange for two minor leaguers. Sanders, Bell, Shinjo, and Lofton helped bolster a Giants offense led by longtime Giants Barry Bonds, J. T. Snow, Rich Aurilia, and Jeff Kent, as well as relative newcomer Benito Santiago. The starting pitching rotation was led by Kirk Rueter and Jason Schmidt, with a bullpen led by Tim Worrell and closer Robb Nen.

During the 2002 regular season, the Giants led the NL West standings for most of April and a few days in May; however, by the end of May they had fallen to third place behind the Los Angeles Dodgers and Arizona Diamondbacks. They spent most of the next three months in third place, but on September 9 they took second place for good, while the Dodgers either tied them or fell to third place for the rest of the season. The Giants finished the regular season with a record of 95–66, 2 1/2 games behind the NL West champion Diamondbacks. They won the NL wild card, 3 1/2 games ahead of the runner-up Dodgers.

In the 2002 postseason, the wild-card Giants' first opponent was the top-seeded Atlanta Braves in the NLDS, who they defeated in five games to return to the NLCS for the first time since 1989. In the NLCS, the Giants defeated the third-seeded St. Louis Cardinals in five games to advance to the World Series for the 17th time in franchise history. Dusty Baker became the first black manager to participate in a World Series since Cito Gaston for Toronto in 1992 and 1993.

This was Giants' outfielder Reggie Sanders' second consecutive World Series appearance with different teams—in 2001 he got there with the Arizona Diamondbacks. This was the first time this happened since Don Baylor did it in three consecutive years with the Boston Red Sox in 1986, the Minnesota Twins in 1987, and with the Oakland Athletics in 1988.

=== Anaheim Angels ===
Like the Giants, the Angels and their fans carried a long history of futility and disappointment. Enfranchised in 1961, the Angels had never before played in the World Series. They also made the postseason only three times previously, which all ended with devastating losses in the ALCS. In their first postseason appearance in 1979, the Angels were soundly defeated by the Baltimore Orioles in four games in the ALCS. In 1982, the Angels would blow a two-games-to-none series lead to the Milwaukee Brewers and lose in five games after being nine outs away from the pennant in Game 5. Then, in their last appearance in 1986, they blew a 3–1 series lead to the Boston Red Sox and lost in seven games after being a strike away from the pennant in Game 5.

2002 was the Angels' third season under manager Mike Scioscia. The Angels finished the previous injury marred season with a record of 75–87, finishing in third place in the AL West. The most notable personnel change during the offseason was the trade of first baseman Mo Vaughn to the New York Mets in exchange for pitcher Kevin Appier. Offensively, the team was led by longtime Angels Garret Anderson, Darin Erstad, Troy Glaus and Tim Salmon, as well as relative newcomers Adam Kennedy and David Eckstein. The starting pitching rotation was led by Ramón Ortiz and Jarrod Washburn, as well as mid-season call-up John Lackey, while the bullpen was led by setup man Brendan Donnelly and closer Troy Percival. The bullpen was bolstered in late September by the addition of 20-year-old reliever prospect Francisco Rodriguez.

The Angels spent much of the season trailing the first-place Seattle Mariners and on occasion the Oakland Athletics in the AL West standings. However, the Athletics and Angels both mounted late-season comebacks that, coupled with a poor August record for the Mariners, knocked the Mariners down to third place. The Athletics won 20 straight games at one point, and the Angels finished the season in second place with a 99–63 record, four games behind the Athletics, but won the AL wild card, six games ahead of the Boston Red Sox and Seattle Mariners. Their 99 wins was third best in the A.L. and fourth best in baseball. It was also a new franchise record.

In the 2002 postseason, the wild-card Angels first faced off against the overall #1 seed and four-time defending American League champion New York Yankees in the ALDS. The Angels shocked the four-time defending AL champions in four games to return to the ALCS for the first time since 1986, winning their first playoff series in franchise history. Their opponent in the ALCS was the third-seeded Minnesota Twins, who they defeated in five games to advance to the World Series for the first time in franchise history, ending a streak of three consecutive ALCS defeats.

== Summary ==
Anaheim won the series, 4–3.

Game	Date	Score	Location	Time	Attendance
1	October 19	San Francisco Giants – 4, Anaheim Angels – 3	Edison International Field of Anaheim	3:44	44,603
2	October 20	San Francisco Giants – 10, Anaheim Angels – 11	Edison International Field of Anaheim	3:57	44,584
3	October 22	Anaheim Angels – 10, San Francisco Giants – 4	Pacific Bell Park	3:37	42,707
4	October 23	Anaheim Angels – 3, San Francisco Giants – 4	Pacific Bell Park	3:02	42,703
5	October 24	Anaheim Angels – 4, San Francisco Giants – 16	Pacific Bell Park	3:53	42,713
6	October 26	San Francisco Giants – 5, Anaheim Angels – 6	Edison International Field of Anaheim	3:48	44,506
7	October 27	San Francisco Giants – 1, Anaheim Angels – 4	Edison International Field of Anaheim	3:16	44,598

== Matchups ==
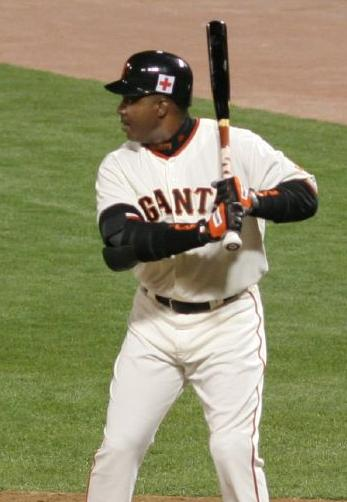
Barry Bonds hit a solo home run in the second inning that gave the Giants the winning margin in Game 1.

=== Game 1 ===
October 19, 2002 5:04 pm (PDT) at Edison International Field in Anaheim, California 63 °F (17 °C), Mostly Clear
Team	1	2	3	4	5	6	7	8	9	R	H	E
San Francisco	0	2	0	0	0	2	0	0	0	4	6	0
Anaheim	0	1	0	0	0	2	0	0	0	3	9	0
WP: Jason Schmidt (1–0) LP: Jarrod Washburn (0–1) Sv: Robb Nen (1); Home runs: SF: Barry Bonds (1), Reggie Sanders (1), J. T. Snow (1); ANA: Troy Glaus 2 (2); Attendance: 44,603; Boxscore

San Francisco won 4–3 at Edison International Field of Anaheim (now Angel Stadium of Anaheim) to take a 1–0 series lead. As he strode into the batter's box to open the second inning, Barry Bonds was finally making his first (and only) World Series appearance; in his first at bat on a 2–1 pitch from Angels starter Jarrod Washburn, Bonds hit a line drive for a home run to right field, which gave the Giants a quick 1–0 lead. Reggie Sanders then followed that up with an opposite-field homer later in the inning. With the Giants leading 2–1 in the fifth, Giants batter J. T. Snow (who formerly played for the Angels) hit a two-run shot over the center field wall after Sanders singled to give San Francisco a three-run advantage. Eventual Series MVP Troy Glaus hit two home runs for the Angels, one in the second and another in the sixth off Giants starter Jason Schmidt. Adam Kennedy drove in a run with a base hit in the sixth as well to trim the deficit to 4–3. However, Schmidt was effective otherwise, along with reliever Félix Rodríguez and closer Robb Nen, as they held off the Halos the rest of the way.

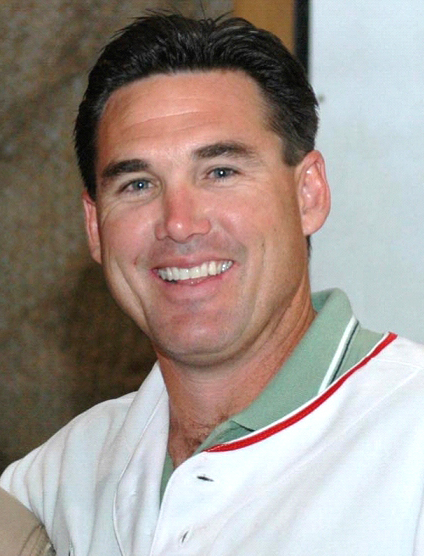
Tim Salmon's two-run home run in the eighth inning of Game 2 tied up the series at one win apiece.

=== Game 2 ===
October 20, 2002 5:04 pm (PDT) at Edison International Field in Anaheim, California 60 °F (16 °C), Overcast
Team	1	2	3	4	5	6	7	8	9	R	H	E
San Francisco	0	4	1	0	4	0	0	0	1	10	12	1
Anaheim	5	2	0	0	1	1	0	2	X	11	16	1
WP: Francisco Rodríguez (1–0) LP: Félix Rodríguez (0–1) Sv: Troy Percival (1); Home runs: SF: Reggie Sanders (2), David Bell (1), Jeff Kent (1), Barry Bonds (2); ANA: Tim Salmon 2 (2); Attendance: 44,584; Boxscore

Game 2 was a slugfest that saw the lead fluctuate wildly between the two teams. The Angels plated five runs in the first inning by batting around against Giants starting pitcher Russ Ortiz. David Eckstein singled to lead off and scored on Darin Erstad's double. After Tim Salmon singled, Garret Anderson's RBI single made it 2–0 Angels. After Troy Glaus flew out, consecutive RBI singles by Brad Fullmer and Scott Spiezio made it 4–0 Angels. Fullmer stole home plate for the Angels' fifth run of the inning.

In the second inning, however, Kevin Appier surrendered most of the lead by allowing a three-run homer to Sanders followed by a shot to David Bell. The Angels answered with a two-run home run from veteran Tim Salmon to make it 7–4 in the Angels' favor. Ortiz would not finish the inning and was relieved by Chad Zerbe, who provided four innings of relief.

Appier did not last much longer than Ortiz, as he was pulled in the third and replaced by John Lackey, the Angels scheduled starter for Game 4, after surrendering a lead-off home run to Jeff Kent. Lackey temporarily quieted the Giants' offense but ran into trouble in the fifth inning, allowing a double and intentional walk. Ben Weber relieved him but allowed a single to Benito Santiago to load the bases, then a two-run single to J. T. Snow that tied the game. After Reggie Sanders struck out, consecutive RBI singles by David Bell and Shawon Dunston gave the Giants a 9–7 lead.

The Angels turned to 20-year-old rookie reliever Francisco Rodriguez, who answered by shutting down the Giants offense for the next three innings. He retired nine batters in a row on 25 pitches (22 were strikes). Meanwhile, the Angels chipped away at their deficit. In the bottom of the fifth, Glaus and Fullmer hit back-to-back leadoff singles before the former scored on Spezio's sacrifice fly. Next inning, Erstad doubled with two outs. Zerbe was relieved by Jay Witasick, who walked Tim Salmon. Aaron Fultz relieved Witasick and allowed an RBI single to Anderson to tie the game, but Salmon was thrown out at third to end the inning.

Salmon drilled a two-run home run with two outs in the eighth inning off of Félix Rodríguez, giving Anaheim an 11–9 lead. Closer Troy Percival retired the first two batters in the ninth, and, after allowing a mammoth shot from Bonds that landed halfway up the right field bleachers, retired Benito Santiago to even the series. Bonds became the first player since Ted Simmons in the 1982 World Series to hit a home run in his first two World Series games, joining Simmons, Dusty Rhodes in the 1954 World Series and Jimmie Foxx in the 1929 World Series. The feat would later be duplicated by Craig Monroe of the Tigers in the 2006 World Series.

Giants pitchers failed to strike out a batter for the entire game, the first time this had happened in the World Series since Game 7 of the 1960 World Series; as of 2026 it remains the last time a team has not recorded a strikeout in a World Series game. The Angels won despite giving up four home runs to the Giants, compared to two by the Angels.

Earlier in the day, the Los Angeles Galaxy won MLS Cup and the Angels would later win this World Series a couple of days later, which meant the Angels and Galaxy were the first MLB and MLS champions from the same metropolitan area within the same season.

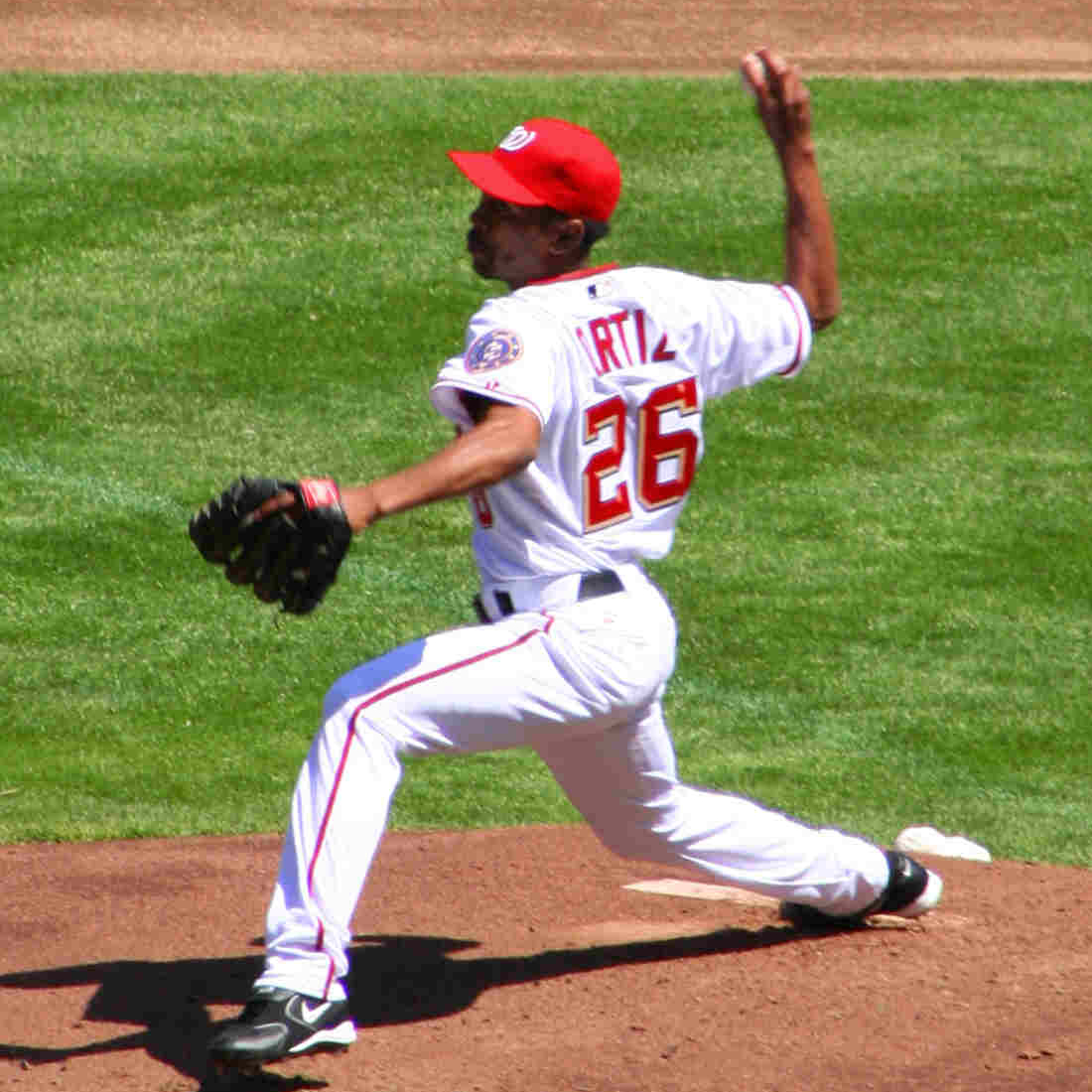
Ramón Ortiz started and won Game 3 for the Angels.

=== Game 3 ===
October 22, 2002 5:27 pm (PDT) at Pacific Bell Park in San Francisco, California 57 °F (14 °C), Mostly Cloudy
Team	1	2	3	4	5	6	7	8	9	R	H	E
Anaheim	0	0	4	4	0	1	0	0	1	10	16	0
San Francisco	1	0	0	0	3	0	0	0	0	4	6	2
WP: Ramón Ortiz (1–0) LP: Liván Hernández (0–1); Home runs: ANA: None; SF: Rich Aurilia (1), Barry Bonds (3); Attendance: 42,707; Boxscore

Anaheim won 10–4 in the first World Series game at Pacific Bell Park (now Oracle Park). The Angels batted around twice without a home run in either of their four-run innings. They became the first team in World Series history to bat around in consecutive innings. Barry Bonds hit another home run, becoming the first player to homer in his first three World Series games.

The Giants struck first on Benito Santiago's based-loaded groundout in the first off of Ramón Ortiz, but Giants starter Liván Hernández walked David Eckstein to lead off the third and allowed a subsequent double to Darin Erstad. An error on Tim Salmon's groundball allowed Eckstein to score. After Garret Anderson flew out, Troy Glaus hit an RBI single and Scott Spiezio followed with a two-run triple. Next inning, Anderson's RBI groundout with runners on second and third chased Hernandez. Jay Witasick entered in relief and walked Glaus before allowing RBI singles to Spiezio, Adam Kennedy and Bengie Molina, which increased Anaheim's lead to 8–1. Rich Aurilia hit a one-out home run in the fifth for the Giants. After Jeff Kent singled, Bonds's home run made it 8–4, but the Giants did not score after that. The Angels added to their lead on Eckstein's RBI single in the sixth off of Aaron Fultz and Erstad's bases-loaded fielder's choice in the eighth off of Scott Eyre.

Giants public address announcer Renel Brooks-Moon is recognized by the Baseball Hall of Fame as the first female announcer of a championship game in any professional sport for her role in the 2002 World Series. Her scorecard from Game 3 is on display in the National Baseball Hall of Fame and Museum in Cooperstown, New York. Until 2014, this game was the Giants' only World Series loss at home since Pacific Bell Park opened in 2000. They proceeded to win the final two games in this series, then won four straight home games in their next two World Series appearances in 2010 and 2012 until finally losing at home in Game 3 in 2014.

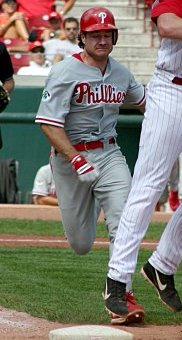
David Bell hit the game-winning RBI single for the Giants in the eighth inning of Game 4.

=== Game 4 ===
October 23, 2002 5:35 pm (PDT) at Pacific Bell Park in San Francisco, California 55 °F (13 °C), Overcast
Team	1	2	3	4	5	6	7	8	9	R	H	E
Anaheim	0	1	2	0	0	0	0	0	0	3	10	1
San Francisco	0	0	0	0	3	0	0	1	X	4	12	1
WP: Tim Worrell (1–0) LP: Francisco Rodríguez (1–1) Sv: Robb Nen (2); Home runs: ANA: Troy Glaus (3); SF: None; Attendance: 42,703; Boxscore

The Angels struck first in the second on David Eckstein's bases-loaded sacrifice fly, then made it 3–0 next inning on Troy Glaus's two-run home run off of starter Kirk Rueter. In the bottom of the fifth, however, Angels starter John Lackey allowed three consecutive leadoff singles, the last of which by Rich Aurilia scoring Rueter. Jeff Kent's sacrifice fly cut the Angels' lead to 3–2 and NLCS MVP Benito Santiago tied the game with a single in after the Angels walked Barry Bonds with a runner on second and two outs. David Bell put the Giants ahead with an RBI single in the bottom of the eighth off of Francisco Rodriguez. The run was unearned, due to Anaheim catcher Bengie Molina's passed ball during the previous at-bat, allowing J. T. Snow to move to second. Tim Worrell got the win for the Giants. San Francisco scored a 4–3 victory to tie the series and ensured a return trip to Anaheim.

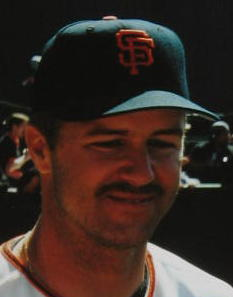
Jeff Kent hit two home runs in the Giants' Game 5 win.

=== Game 5 ===
October 24, 2002 5:22 pm (PDT) at Pacific Bell Park in San Francisco, California 59 °F (15 °C), Mostly Cloudy
Team	1	2	3	4	5	6	7	8	9	R	H	E
Anaheim	0	0	0	0	3	1	0	0	0	4	10	2
San Francisco	3	3	0	0	0	2	4	4	X	16	16	0
WP: Chad Zerbe (1–0) LP: Jarrod Washburn (0–2); Home runs: ANA: None; SF: Jeff Kent 2 (3), Rich Aurilia (2); Attendance: 42,713; Boxscore

San Francisco took a 16–4 blowout win in a game in which the Angels never led. The most well-known moment in this game occurred in the bottom of the seventh when Giants first baseman J. T. Snow scored off a Kenny Lofton triple. Three-year-old batboy Darren, son of Giants manager Dusty Baker, ran to home plate to collect Lofton's bat before the play was completed and was quickly lifted by the jacket by Snow with one hand as he crossed the plate, with David Bell close on his heels. Had Snow not acted quickly, Darren could have been seriously injured in a play at home plate.

Giants' second-baseman Jeff Kent hit two home runs to break out of a slump (hitting his first home run since Game 2), driving in four runs.

In the bottom of the first, Barry Bonds's double off of Jarrod Washburn with runners on first and second gave the Giants an early lead. Benito Santiago's sacrifice fly, followed by three consecutive walks made it 3–0 Giants. Next inning, Benito's bases-loaded single scored two and Reggie Sanders's sacrifice fly scored another. Orlando Palmeiro doubled to lead off the top of the fifth, moved to third on David Eckstein's single and scored on Darin Erstad's sacrifice fly. After Tim Salmon singled, a wild pitch by starter Jason Schmidt allowed Eckstein to score. After Garret Anderson struck out, Troy Glaus's RBI double cut the Giants' lead to 6–3. The Angels cut it to 6–4 next inning off of Chad Zerbe on Eckstein's groundout with runners on second and third, but did not score again. Kent's two-run home run in the bottom half off of Ben Weber widened the Giants' lead to 8–4. Next inning, Kenny Lofton's two-run triple made it 10-4 Giants. Scot Shields relieved Weber and after Aurilia struck out, Kent's second home run of the game made it 12–4 Giants. Next inning, Shields allowed consecutive one-out singles to J. T. Snow and David Bell, then an error on Tsuyoshi Shinjo's ground ball made it 13–4 Giants. After Lofton grounded out, Aurilia capped the scoring with a three-run home run. Scott Eyre retired the Angels in order in the ninth as the Giants were one win away from a World Series title. Chad Zerbe earned the win for the Giants.

This game shares one peculiar record with Game 2 of the 1960 World Series. The two games share the World Series record for most runs scored by a game winning team who ultimately went on to lose the series.

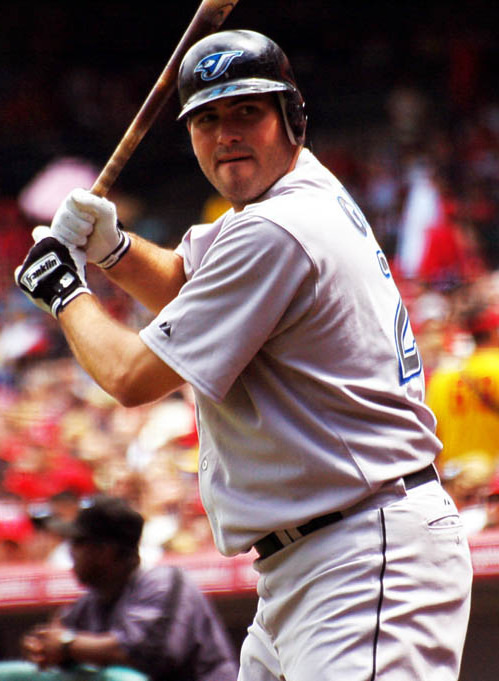
Troy Glaus's two-RBI double in the eighth inning of Game 6 capped off a dramatic come-from-behind victory for the Angels.

=== Game 6 ===
October 26, 2002 4:58 pm (PDT) at Edison International Field in Anaheim, California 61 °F (16 °C), Mostly Clear
Team	1	2	3	4	5	6	7	8	9	R	H	E
San Francisco	0	0	0	0	3	1	1	0	0	5	8	1
Anaheim	0	0	0	0	0	0	3	3	X	6	10	1
WP: Brendan Donnelly (1–0) LP: Tim Worrell (1–1) Sv: Troy Percival (2); Home runs: SF: Shawon Dunston (1), Barry Bonds (4); ANA: Scott Spiezio (1), Darin Erstad (1); Attendance: 44,506; Boxscore

The turning point in the Series came in Game 6. Following the top of the seventh inning, the Giants led 5–0 but then proceeded to surrender three runs in the bottom of the inning and another three runs in the bottom of the eighth inning and lost the game 6–5.

The game was scoreless through the first four innings. In the top of the fifth, San Francisco took the lead. David Bell singled with one out, then Shawon Dunston's home run made it 2–0 Giants. After Kenny Lofton doubled, Francisco Rodríguez relieved Kevin Appier. Lofton stole third and scored on a wild pitch. In the top of the sixth, Barry Bonds homered off Rodriguez to make it 4–0, and the Giants added another run in the top of the seventh when Lofton singled and stole second and was driven in by a single by Jeff Kent.

Leading 5–0 with one out in the bottom of the seventh inning, eight outs away from the Giants' first World Series title since moving to San Francisco in 1958, Giants manager Dusty Baker pulled starting pitcher Russ Ortiz, who had shut out the Angels during the game, for setup man Félix Rodríguez after Ortiz gave up consecutive singles to third baseman Troy Glaus and designated hitter Brad Fullmer. In a move noted in later years, Baker gave Ortiz the game ball as he sent him back to the dugout, as Ortiz wanted a souvenir ball (contrary to some belief, the Angels did not see the move in real time). During the pitching change the Rally Monkey came on the JumboTron, sending Angels fans into a frenzy.

Angels first baseman Scott Spiezio then fouled off pitch after pitch before finally hitting a three-run home run that barely cleared the wall and outfielder Reggie Sanders' glove in right field. Ortiz would be charged with two runs and a no-decision, his second of the series. Tim Worrell recorded the final out of the seventh inning with two runners on, but he allowed the rally to continue in the eighth, as Angels center fielder Darin Erstad hit a leadoff line-drive home run, followed by consecutive singles by Tim Salmon and Garret Anderson. When Bonds misplayed Anderson's shallow left field bloop single, Chone Figgins (who had pinch-run for Salmon) and Anderson took third and second base, respectively. With no outs, two runners in scoring position and now only a 5–4 lead, Baker brought in closer Robb Nen to pitch to Glaus, hoping that Nen could induce a strikeout that might yet preserve the Giants' slim lead; prior to that game, he was seven of seven in postseason saves that year despite dealing with a shoulder injury. However, Glaus slugged a double to the left-center field gap over Bonds' head to drive in the tying and go-ahead runs and giving Nen a blown save. Nen managed to keep Glaus from scoring before leaving the game, which ended up being his final appearance as a major league player.

In the ninth inning, Angels closer Troy Percival struck out Tom Goodwin, induced a foul popout from Lofton, and struck out Rich Aurilia to preserve the 6–5 victory in front of the jubilant home crowd. The comeback from a five-run deficit was the largest overcome in World Series history for a team facing elimination, and had been cited as another manifestation of the Curse of Coogan's Bluff. No other team overcame a five-run deficit to win a World Series game until Game 1 of the 2022 World Series, when the Philadelphia Phillies did so against the Houston Astros. That Astros team, like the Giants, was managed by Dusty Baker. The Los Angeles Dodgers also overcame a 5-run deficit in Game 5 of the 2024 World Series against the New York Yankees to clinch the series, 4 games to 1.

This game ranked number 2 as ESPN's Game of the Year in 2002.

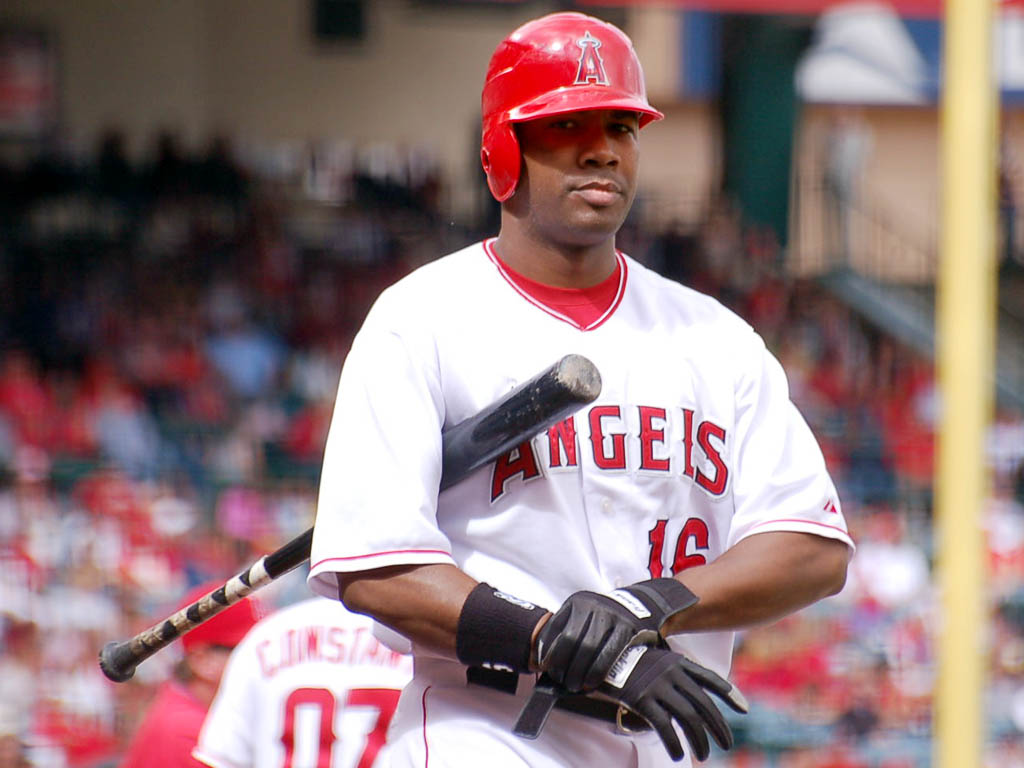
Garret Anderson's bases-loaded double in the third inning gave the Angels a 3-run lead that they never relinquished.

=== Game 7 ===
October 27, 2002 5:02 pm (PST) at Edison International Field in Anaheim, California 63 °F (17 °C), Mostly clear
Team	1	2	3	4	5	6	7	8	9	R	H	E
San Francisco	0	1	0	0	0	0	0	0	0	1	6	0
Anaheim	0	1	3	0	0	0	0	0	X	4	5	0
WP: John Lackey (1–0) LP: Liván Hernández (0–2) Sv: Troy Percival (3); Attendance: 44,598; Boxscore

Game 7 proved to be somewhat anticlimactic after the drama of Game 6. The Giants scored the first run in the top of the second inning when Reggie Sanders hit a sacrifice fly to score Benito Santiago from third (after back-to-back singles from Santiago and J.T. Snow), but the Angels responded with a run-scoring double from catcher Bengie Molina that scored Scott Spiezio from first after he had walked with two outs. In the bottom of the third, David Eckstein and Darin Erstad led off with back-to-back singles and Tim Salmon was hit in his hand by a pitch to load the bases with no outs (Salmon would later leave the game due to the injury, being replaced by Alex Ochoa). Left fielder Garret Anderson then hit a bases-clearing three-run double to push the Angels to a 4–1 lead and gave San Francisco starter Liván Hernández the loss. Hernández was yanked after walking Troy Glaus to put two on, but Chad Zerbe got out of the nightmarish inning.

Zerbe, Kirk Rueter, and Tim Worrell held the Angels scoreless for the rest of the game, allowing only one hit, but did not get any run support. Rookie starting pitcher John Lackey maintained the three-run lead through five innings, and turned the game over to the strong Angels bullpen. Brendan Donnelly stranded two runners in the sixth inning by striking out Tom Goodwin before pitching a perfect seventh, while Francisco Rodriguez struck out three of the four batters he faced in the eighth to bring his ERA in his breakout postseason under 2.00.

In the ninth inning, closer Troy Percival provided some tense moments. J.T. Snow led off with a single and was forced out at second by Tom Goodwin. David Bell then walked, putting two men on with only one out and the tying run at the plate. But Tsuyoshi Shinjo—the first Japanese-born player in a World Series game—struck out swinging, and Kenny Lofton, also representing the tying run, flied out to Darin Erstad in right-center field to end the Series. The Angels won Game 7, 4–1, to claim their franchise's first and only World Series championship to date. John Lackey became the first rookie pitcher to win a World Series Game 7 since 1909. In Game 7, three rookie pitchers (Lackey, Donnelly, and Rodriguez) combined to throw eight innings while only giving up one run combined.

The Angels won the World Series despite scoring fewer runs (41) than the Giants (44). The Angels lost the first game in all three rounds of the playoffs (Division Series, League Championship Series, and World Series), yet rebounded to win each time. They were the first, and to date only, team to do this since the new postseason format was created in 1994.

Until 2017, this was the last time a franchise would win its first World Series title. It was also the second year in a row that the feat had been accomplished; in 2001, the Diamondbacks beat the Yankees in just their fourth year of existence. Also in those two years, both teams won the World Series in just their first appearance, which did not happen again until 2019, when the Washington Nationals would accomplish the feat.

The Angels became the first American League (AL) champion team not representing the AL East Division to win the World Series since the Minnesota Twins in 1991. The Angels were also the first American League Wild Card winner to win the World Series. With this win the Angels got rid of the supposed curse on their head stemming from Anaheim Stadium being built on an ancient Indian burial ground.

== Composite box ==
2002 World Series (4–3): Anaheim Angels (A.L.) over San Francisco Giants (N.L.)

Team	1	2	3	4	5	6	7	8	9	R	H	E
Anaheim Angels	5	5	9	4	4	5	3	6	0	41	76	5
San Francisco Giants	4	10	1	0	13	5	5	5	1	44	66	5
Total attendance: 306,414 Average attendance: 43,773; Winning player's share: $272,147 Losing player's share: $186,186

The Angels and the Giants combined to log 85 runs over the course of the series, the largest combined run total for both teams in World Series history.

== Series overview and aftermath ==
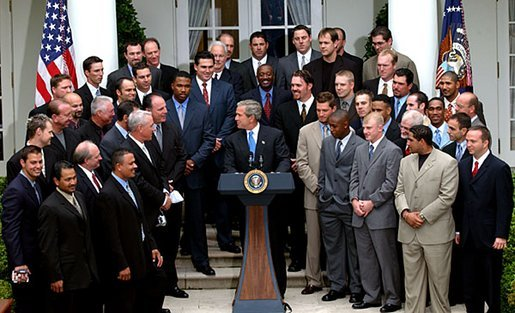
Victorious Angels players being honored at the White House Rose Garden by President George W. Bush.

There would not be another World Series that was played entirely within one state until 2020, which took place entirely at a single neutral site (Globe Life Field in Arlington, Texas) due to the COVID-19 pandemic. There would not be another postseason match-up between two California teams until the 2020 National League Division Series between the Los Angeles Dodgers and San Diego Padres, also played at Globe Life Field, and there has yet to be another World Series between two teams from the same state.

This was the last World Series where home-field advantage alternated between the National and American Leagues each year. As a result of the tie in the 2002 All-Star Game, beginning in 2003, home-field advantage in the World Series was controversially granted to the league that won the All-Star Game. That practice ended after the 2016 Series; since 2017, the team with the better regular season record now enjoys home field advantage, the same format used in the National Basketball Association (NBA)'s Finals and National Hockey League (NHL)'s Stanley Cup Final.

Following the Darren Baker incident in game 5, MLB changed their rules requiring batboys and batgirls be at least 14 years old.

=== Angels ===
Just before the start of the 2003 season, the Walt Disney Company sold the Angels for $180 million to businessman Arte Moreno. Nevertheless, the 2002 World Series win began the most successful era in Angels franchise history, making six postseason appearances from 2002 to 2009. Before 2002, they had been to the postseason three times in franchise history (1979, 1982, and 1986). They advanced to the ALCS in 2005 and 2009, but lost those series respectively to the Chicago White Sox and New York Yankees, each while en route to their own World Series championship. The Angels were the most recent team to win the championship in its first World Series appearance until the Washington Nationals accomplished the feat in 2019; between 2002 and 2019, all first-time World Series participants would lose—the Houston Astros in 2005, Colorado Rockies in 2007, Tampa Bay Rays in 2008, and Texas Rangers in 2010. The 2002 Angels also remain the most recent American League team to win Game 7 of the World Series at home.

The Angels were the last of four Los Angeles area teams to win a championship in 2002, with the Lakers, Sparks, and Galaxy all winning a title in their respective leagues prior. It was the first time ever four teams in the same metropolitan area won a championship within the same season. The seven days between the Galaxy's Cup win and the Angels' World Series was the shortest timespan for two championships in the same metro area.

The Angels would sparingly use the Rally Monkey mascot after the 2002 World Series and unofficially retired it after the 2009 postseason.

Although Francisco Rodriguez wasn't the first young pitcher to come up from the minors in September and dominate throughout the postseason, this idea was popularized during the Angels' postseason run. The theory is that a contending team calls up a minor league pitcher in September just before the end of the regular season; hitters in the postseason have very little idea what to expect from the pitcher, a situation that often favors the pitcher. Examples of this in the future were David Price for the Tampa Bay Rays in 2008 and Trey Yesavage for the Toronto Blue Jays in 2025.

Both David Eckstein and Scott Spiezio later played for the 2006 St. Louis Cardinals world championship team. Eckstein and Spiezio played alongside Yadier Molina, younger brother of Bengie and José Molina, on the Cardinals. José later won a second World Series title with the 2009 Yankees, while John Lackey added two World Series rings with the 2013 Boston Red Sox and 2016 Chicago Cubs.

=== Giants ===
Due to the Angels claiming the title in Game 7, the Game 6 collapse entered baseball lore as part of the Curse of Coogan's Bluff superstition used to explain the Giants' championship drought since the 1954 World Series.

Game 7 of the series was Dusty Baker's final game as manager of the Giants, as he left in the offseason to take the same position with the Cubs due to disagreements with ownership. Game 7 was also Jeff Kent's last game in San Francisco, as he signed a free-agent contract to play for the Houston Astros during the off-season. The departure of manager Baker, a season-long feud with Barry Bonds and a desire to be closer to his family's Texas ranch factored into Kent's eventual decision to leave the Giants. He retired as the all-time leader in home runs as a second baseman. Although Kent failed on his initial tries to be inducted into the National Baseball Hall of Fame, he was later inducted in 2026. He was the first, and to date, only player from the 2002 World Series to be placed in the Hall of Fame.

The Giants would return to the postseason the following season under new manager Felipe Alou with a 100 win-season (the first time in ten years), but they would lose in the NLDS to the Florida Marlins, a Wild Card team that later won the World Series championship. After a second-place finish in 2004, the Giants had losing seasons for the next four years, and they replaced Alou with Bruce Bochy in 2007. After losing 90 games in 2008, the Giants won 88 games for a surprising third-place finish in 2009. Building on their 2009 season, the Giants returned to the postseason in 2010 by winning the NL West, defeating the Braves in the NLDS, and the Phillies in the NLCS en route to the World Series, where they defeated the Rangers in five games, earning the long-awaited championship they could not reach in 2002. In 2012, after fighting back from down two games to none in the NLDS against the Cincinnati Reds (led by Baker) and down three games to one against the defending World Series Champion St. Louis Cardinals in the NLCS, they swept the Detroit Tigers for their second World Series Championship in three years. In 2014, the Giants added their third title in five seasons by defeating the Kansas City Royals in seven games.

Of the players from the 2002 Giants (excluding previous World Series champions Liván Hernández, Robb Nen, and Reggie Sanders), only Scott Eyre and Pedro Feliz went on to win a World Series ring with another team. Eyre and Feliz became teammates on the 2008 Philadelphia Phillies world championship team. There were no members of the 2002 squad on any of the three championship squads of the 2010s; Bonds retired in 2007, Aurilia retired in 2009 (the year before the Giants' first title in San Francisco), and Joe Nathan, who pitched in less than four innings for the Giants in the regular season, didn't return to the team until his final season in 2016.

==== Barry Bonds ====
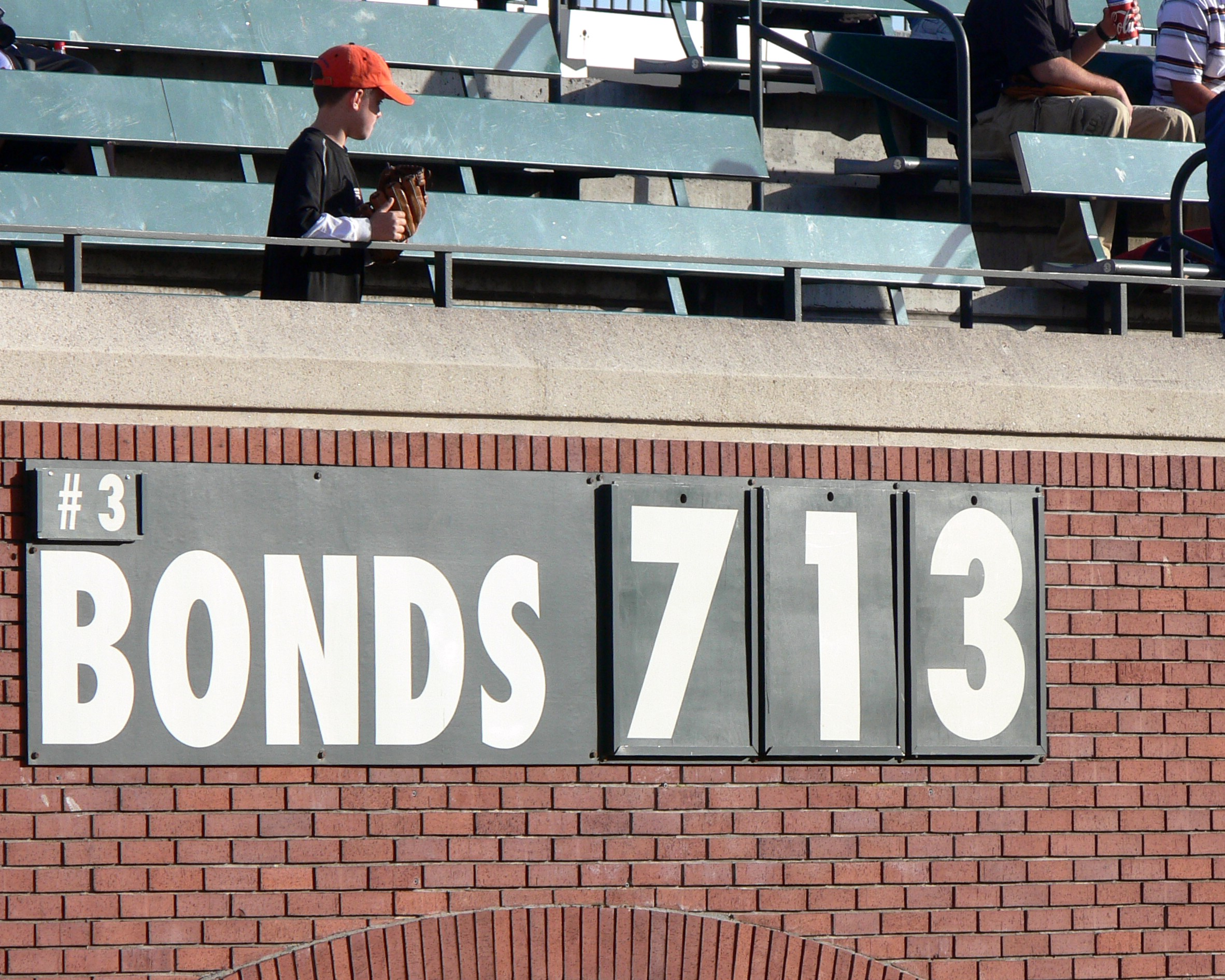
A sign displays Bonds' home run count at 713 (at the time, just one shy of Babe Ruth for third all-time in MLB history).

In terms of personal accolades, Barry Bonds would break Hank Aaron's all-time homerun record in 2007. Bonds also won two more National League MVPs in 2003 and 2004, extending his record for most MVP Awards to seven. Bonds would enter free agency at the end of the 2007 season for the first time since coming over from Pittsburgh to San Francisco in 1993, but there were no teams interested in signing him. Bonds would not play another major league game after the 2007 season. He retired as one of the greatest players in MLB history to never to win a championship, along with Ted Williams and Ty Cobb, with the three straight NLCS trips in 1990, 1991, and 1992 with Pittsburgh and 2002 being his only real shot at a World Series in his 21-year career.

Bonds' last few seasons and his post-playing career would be mired due to performance enhancing drugs (PEDs) allegations. The only way Bonds could make the National Baseball Hall of Fame would be through the Veterans Committee, as he lost out to David Ortiz in the 2022 ballot, his 10th and final one. This was met with negative reaction from some fans, as fans complained that Ortiz had made the Hall of Fame, despite testing positive for PEDs in 2003, whilst Bonds never tested positive for any PEDs.

==== Dusty Baker ====
Dusty Baker received great fan ire for his decision to pull Russ Ortiz in Game 6 with a 5–0 lead and just a few more outs away from clinching San Francisco's first World Series in the city.

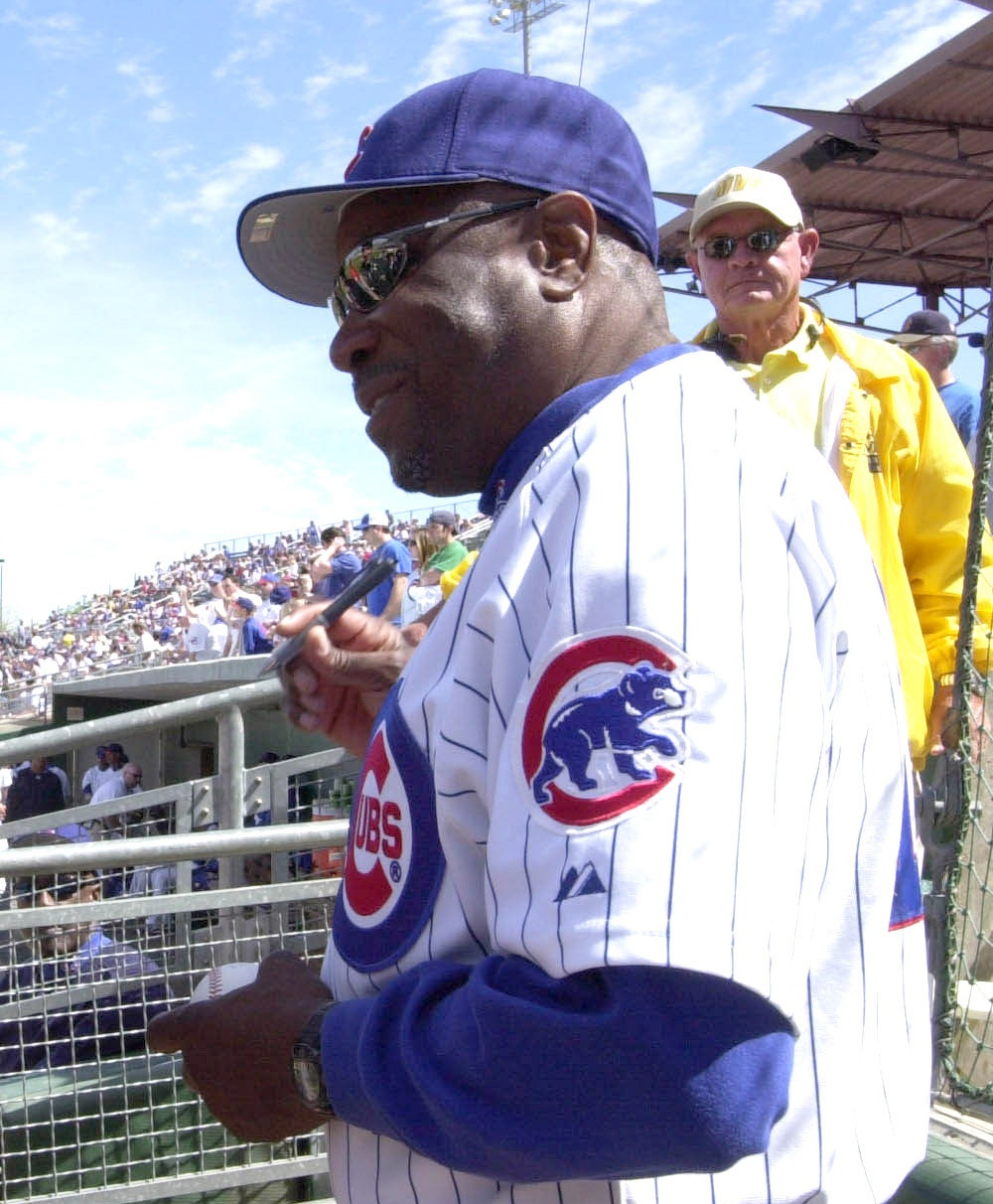
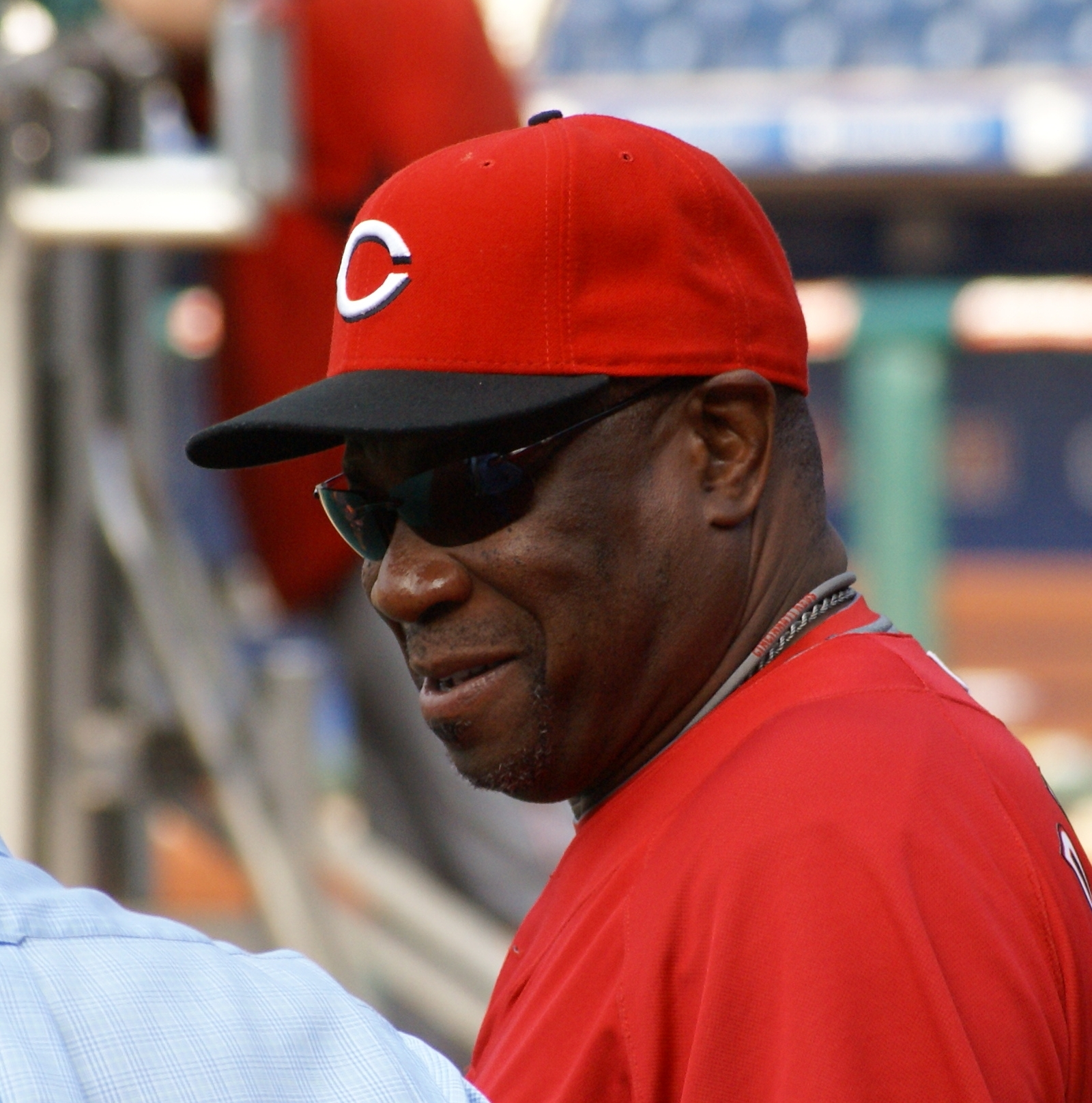
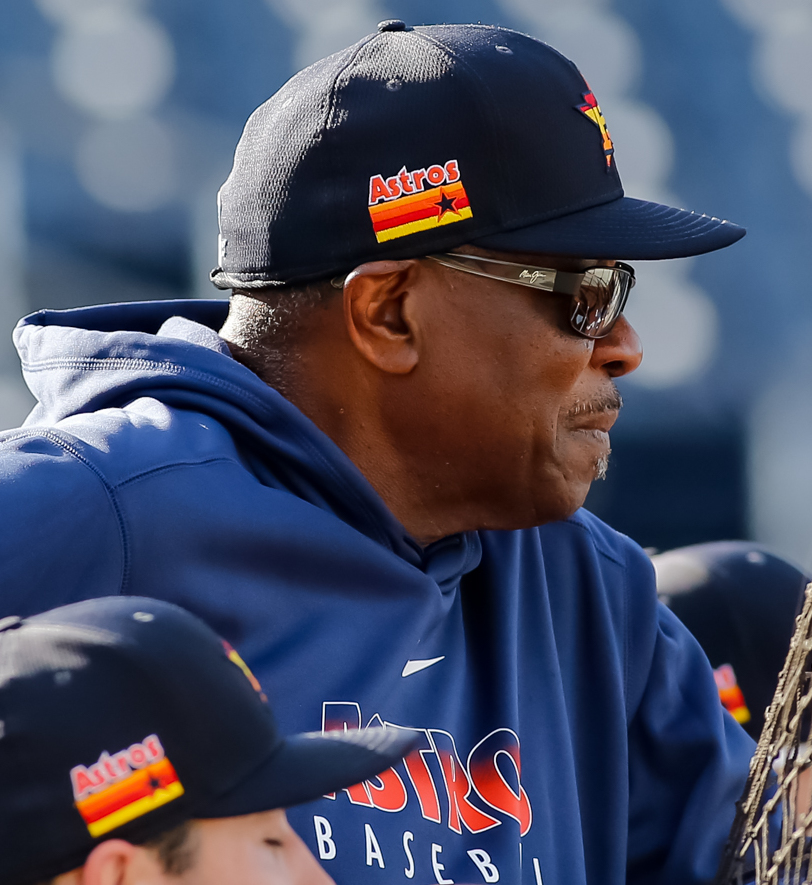
Baker managed multiple teams after his Giants tenure (pictured clockwise: Cubs, Reds, Nationals, Astros). He would not win a World Series until 20 years later in 2022 with the Astros.

Baker would serve as the manager for the Chicago Cubs in 2003 after mutually parting ways in San Francisco after the World Series. As with the Giants, he would help break a postseason drought, as he led them to a series victory in the 2003 National League Division Series over Atlanta, the first postseason series victory in 95 years for Chicago. However, they would lose in the 2003 National League Championship Series to the Florida Marlins when they were five outs from clinching a pennant in Game 6. This was the first of a long line of postseason futility for Baker, who went to the postseason five further times in his next eleven seasons as a manager but failed to win a single series. In 2020, he was hired to manage the Houston Astros. He broke his postseason drought with the team by winning in the Wild Card Series that year (2020) and then returned to the World Series the following year (where they ultimately lost to Atlanta in six games) after winning the 2021 American League Championship Series. In 2022, he finally won a World championship on his third try, defeating Philadelphia in six games to set a new mark of being the manager with the most regular season victories (2,093) before winning their first championship. Russ Ortiz, the pitcher who nearly won Baker a world championship 20 years prior, congratulated Baker on his first championship as a manager on Instagram. After his retirement in 2023, Baker joined the Giants front office as a special advisor, his third stint with the club (player in 1984, manager from 1993–2002).

Dusty's son Darren, who was nearly injured in Game 5 in a collision at home plate, eventually made the major leagues, debuting with the Washington Nationals in 2024.

== Radio and television ==
- Fox's telecast of this World Series marked the first time the World Series was telecast in high-definition.
- Jon Miller, who called this World Series for ESPN Radio, has been play-by-play man for the San Francisco Giants since 1997. Coincidentally, KNBR, the Giants' longtime flagship station, was also San Francisco's ESPN Radio affiliate.
- This would be the only World Series called by Angels play-by-play man Rory Markas, who died of a heart attack in January 2010.

== See also ==
- 2002 Japan Series
- Curse of Coogan's Bluff
