= Chad Zerbe =

American baseball player (born 1972)

- Pitcher
- Born: April 27, 1972 (age 54); Findlay, Ohio, U.S.
- Batted: Left Threw: Left

MLB debut
- September 18, 2000, for the San Francisco Giants

Last MLB appearance
- September 27, 2003, for the San Francisco Giants

MLB statistics
- Win–loss record: 6–1
- Earned run average: 3.87
- Strikeouts: 70
- Stats at Baseball Reference

Teams
- San Francisco Giants (2000–2003)

William Chad Zerbe (born April 27, 1972) is an American former professional baseball relief pitcher. He played in Major League Baseball for the San Francisco Giants from 2000 to 2003.

== Career ==
Zerbe played nine seasons in minor league baseball before making his major league debut in 2000. He began his career in the Los Angeles Dodgers organization in 1991, and was released at the end of the 1996 season. After a brief stint with the Arizona Diamondbacks organization, he was signed by the Giants after the 1997 season.

In the major leagues, Zerbe had a career record of 6–1 with an ERA of 3.87. He was the winning pitcher in Game 5 of the 2002 World Series against the Anaheim Angels. As of 2011, he holds the all-time Major League Baseball record for registering the most career appearances before his first loss.

Following his career in baseball, Zerbe became a Deputy Sheriff with the San Bernardino County Sheriff's Department.
