= Kevin Appier =

American baseball player (born 1967)

- Pitcher
- Born: December 6, 1967 (age 58); Lancaster, California, U.S.
- Batted: Right Threw: Right

MLB debut
- June 4, 1989, for the Kansas City Royals

Last MLB appearance
- April 23, 2004, for the Kansas City Royals

MLB statistics
- Win–loss record: 169–137
- Earned run average: 3.74
- Strikeouts: 1,994
- Stats at Baseball Reference

Teams
- Kansas City Royals (1989–1999); Oakland Athletics (1999–2000); New York Mets (2001); Anaheim Angels (2002–2003); Kansas City Royals (2003–2004)

Career highlights and awards
- All-Star (1995); World Series champion (2002); AL ERA leader (1993); Kansas City Royals Hall of Fame

Robert Kevin Appier (/ˈeɪpiər/; born December 6, 1967) is an American former professional baseball pitcher who played 16 seasons in Major League Baseball (MLB), primarily for the Kansas City Royals.

Appier's solid pitching during his first full season in the majors earned him several rookie accolades in 1990. His fastball, tight slider and nasty forkball contributed to impressive pitching statistics, distinguishing himself as one of the American League's top right-handed starting pitchers throughout much of the 1990s. Appier enjoyed the most success with the Royals in the early to mid-1990s as one of the league's earned run average leaders, a Cy Young Award contender in 1993 and culminating in 1995 with a selection to the American League All-Star team. He was a starting pitcher on the World Series champion Anaheim Angels in 2002, before retiring four seasons later.

== Career ==
=== Kansas City Royals ===
Appier had a strong rookie campaign for the Kansas City Royals in 1990, going 12-8 and posting the league's fourth-best ERA (2.76), thus earning him Rookie Pitcher of the Year honors. In 1991, he had 13 wins (tied for the team best), and pitched 3 shutouts, two of which were back to back against the Boston Red Sox and New York Yankees. He was the Opening Day starter in 1992 and posted a 15–8 record with the league's second-best ERA (2.46) for a team that only went 72–90. Highlights of the season included a career-high nine-game winning streak and the American League Pitcher of the Month award for July, in which he went 4–0 with a 1.55 ERA. In 1993, Appier posted an 18–8 record with an AL leading 2.56 ERA, set a club record of 33 consecutive scoreless innings, and finished third in Cy Young Award balloting. In 1995, he was selected for his only All-Star team, pitching 2 perfect innings for the American League. He reached a career high in strikeouts in 1996 with 207, and won his first of two Roberto Clemente Awards (the other in 1998). Appier suffered through his first sub-.500 season in 1997, despite posting a 3.40 ERA (7th best in AL)

Despite being one of the better pitchers in baseball during this time period, his accomplishments went largely unnoticed due to playing for the Royals, a small market team that was generally not in contention during Appier's tenure. In 1997, under the promise of the team's improvement, he signed a long-term extension. During that offseason, he suffered a fall at his home resulting in a separated clavicle. Though he recovered from that injury, in March 1998 he needed surgery for an unrelated long-term progressing shoulder ailment, the repair of a torn labrum, causing him to miss nearly the entire 1998 season. In 1999, after losing faith in the direction of the Royals organization and eager to play with a contender, Appier requested to be traded.

=== Oakland Athletics ===
In the middle of the 1999 season, Appier was dealt to the Oakland Athletics for three pitchers, Jeff D'Amico, Brad Rigby and Blake Stein. As the Athletics made their surprising run winning the AL West title in 2000, Appier provided a solid veteran arm in support of Oakland's developing young starters, making his eight Opening Day start and winning 15 games for the fifth time in his career. Despite a good showing, he lost his only start in that year's ALDS when the Athletics were shut out. In Game 5, after the Yankees scored 6 runs in the first inning, Appier (for the first time in 10 years) came in to relieve in the 2nd inning, pitching four innings and allowing one run. For the series, Appier posted a 3.48 ERA with 13 strikeouts in 10.1 innings pitched.

=== New York Mets ===
A free agent after the season, Appier signed a four-year, $42 million contract with the New York Mets, with which he tied for the team lead in wins, going 11–10 with a 3.57 ERA and went undefeated in his final 12 appearances, going 6-0 during that span. Making a playoff push, the Mets went 6–0 in his final six starts with Appier going 4–0 with a 1.87 ERA.

=== Anaheim Angels ===
After the one season campaign in New York, Appier was traded to the Anaheim Angels for Mo Vaughn. During a solid season with the World Series winning Angels in 2002, Appier went 14–12 with a 3.92 ERA. In Game 2 of the ALDS, Appier went 5 innings, giving up 3 runs, and left the game leading 4–3, but received a no-decision in an Angels victory after a blown save by Francisco Rodríguez. In Game One of the ALCS, Appier went 5 innings in a 2–1 loss against the Minnesota Twins. He also started Game 5, going 5 1/3 innings and leaving with the Angels leading 3–2 in the game that sent Anaheim to the World Series, though he once again did not receive the decision. He finished the ALCS with a 3.48 ERA. Starting Game 2 of the World Series, Appier did not factor into the decision after allowing 5 runs in two innings, as the Angels went on to win the game 11–10. With the Angels facing elimination, Appier started Game 6, pitching four innings of shutout ball before yielding a two-run home run in the fifth inning, and leaving with a man on base who eventually scored via stolen base and wild pitch off Francisco Rodriguez, leaving him with an 11.37 ERA for the Series, which the Angels won in seven games.

=== Return to Kansas City ===
In 2003, Appier was plagued with a previously undiagnosed flexor tendon injury and was eventually released at the end of July. He signed with the Royals, but after four starts needed surgery. After missing most of 2004, Appier briefly retired, but came out of retirement and re-signed with the Royals to a minor-league contract before the 2005 season, failing to make the team in Spring training and retiring on March 29.

In 2011, Appier was inducted into the Kansas City Royals Hall of Fame. During his 13 seasons with Kansas City, he accumulated an overall record of 115–92 with an ERA of 3.49 over the course of 287 games.

=== Seattle Mariners ===
In October 2005, Appier applied for reinstatement with Major League Baseball and signed a minor-league contract with the Seattle Mariners. During 10 games with the AAA Tacoma Rainiers, Appier was 1–2 with a 4.54 ERA. On June 3, 2006, Appier asked for and was granted his release by the Mariners, officially retiring the next month.

== Personal life ==
Appier married his first wife, Deann, in 1987. The marriage ended in divorce in 1994. Since 1996 Appier has been married to Laurie. The couple has three children: Garrett, Britney, and Evelyn.

After retiring from baseball, Appier and his family moved full time to Paola, Kansas, where he has a soybean farm.

== See also ==
- List of Major League Baseball annual ERA leaders
- List of Major League Baseball single-inning strikeout leaders
- List of Major League Baseball career strikeout leaders
