= Troy Percival =

American baseball player (born 1969)

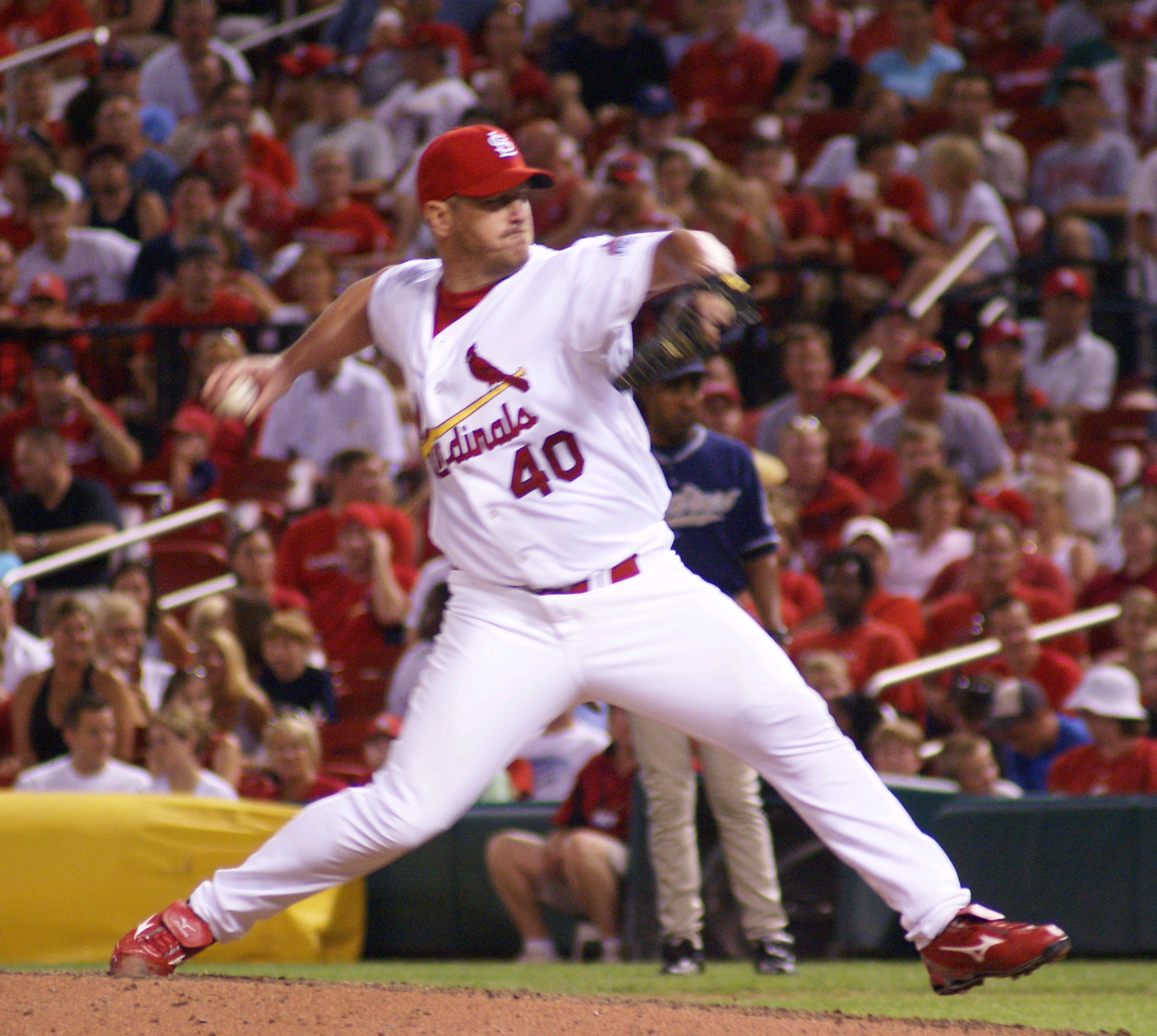
- Percival with the St. Louis Cardinals in 2007

Long Beach Coast
- Pitcher / Manager
- Born: August 9, 1969 (age 57); Fontana, California, U.S.
- Batted: Right Threw: Right

MLB debut
- April 26, 1995, for the California Angels

Last MLB appearance
- May 21, 2009, for the Tampa Bay Rays

MLB statistics
- Win–loss record: 35–43
- Earned run average: 3.17
- Strikeouts: 781
- Saves: 358
- Stats at Baseball Reference

Teams
- California / Anaheim Angels (1995–2004); Detroit Tigers (2005); St. Louis Cardinals (2007); Tampa Bay Rays (2008–2009)

Career highlights and awards
- 4× All-Star (1996, 1998, 1999, 2001); World Series champion (2002)

Troy Eugene Percival (born August 9, 1969) is an American professional baseball coach and former pitcher. He is currently the manager of the Long Beach Coast of the Pioneer League. During a 14-year baseball career spanning from 1995 to 2009, he pitched for four Major League Baseball (MLB) teams, primarily with the California/Anaheim Angels. He was an integral part of that franchise's 2002 World Series championship team, and gained fame as a closer.

== Amateur career ==
Percival started playing baseball at Moreno Valley Youth Federation (MVYF). Percival played on the Moreno Valley High School baseball team, before attending the University of California, Riverside, where he played college baseball for the Highlanders from 1987–1990.

== Professional career ==
=== California Angels / Anaheim Angels ===
Percival was then drafted by the California Angels in the 6th round, with the 175th overall selection, of the 1990 Major League Baseball draft as a catcher. He batted .203 in his only season as a catcher with the Boise Hawks and was converted to a pitcher when coaches noticed that his return throws to the mound were actually faster than the pitches he caught. He made his major league debut as a reliever in 1995, and was mostly used as a setup man for Lee Smith. He was coached by his father Richard Percival for all of his childhood years.

In 1996, he became the regular closer for the Angels and had 36 saves with 100 strikeouts in 74 innings. He is one of only six pitchers in the Angels' 44-year history to strike out at least 100 batters in a season without starting a game. The others are Mark Clear (105, 1980), DeWayne Buice (109, 1987), Bryan Harvey (101, 1991) Scot Shields (109, 2004) and Francisco Rodríguez (123, 2004).

He had a career-high 42 saves in 1998, and enjoyed his best season in 2002 with a 4–1 record, 40 saves, 68 strikeouts, and a 1.92 ERA. That year en route to winning the World Series, he was 7 for 7 in save opportunities, tying John Wetteland for most saves in one postseason (since tied by Brad Lidge, Koji Uehara and Greg Holland; Robb Nen was also 7 for 7 but blew one on the eighth opportunity).

A four-time All-Star, Percival compiled a 29–38 record with a 2.99 ERA in 586.2 innings for the Angels. His 355 saves grant him inclusion in the 300 save club. However, his strikeouts per nine innings went down considerably after his years as an elite closer. In 2001, his K/9 rate was 11.08 and decreased to 5.98 in 2004. His fastball, once clocked consistently at 96–100 MPH, was down to about 92–93 MPH in 2004, due to a degenerative hip condition that first appeared in 2003, which forced him to alter his pitching delivery.

Percival's contract with the Angels expired in 2004 and he became a free agent at the end of that season. Rather than bring Percival back, the Angels decided to turn to young phenom Francisco Rodríguez to close, motivated largely by Rodríguez's much lower price tag and concerns about Percival's age and health. The Angels offered to negotiate a reduced role (at a correspondingly reduced salary) for Percival to return as a setup man, but Percival decided to seek opportunities elsewhere that would allow him to remain a closer.

=== Detroit Tigers ===
Percival signed with the Detroit Tigers as a free agent for the 2005 season. However, after a mediocre start to his career at Comerica Park, during which he converted eight saves from 11 opportunities and posted an ERA of 5.76, Percival suffered a serious injury to his right forearm in early July. The severity of the injury ended his season, and put the rest of his career in doubt.

After attempting to recuperate, Percival reported to spring training for the Tigers in 2006. However, on his first outing he again suffered significant pain and left the team. After spending the entire 2006 season on the Tigers' disabled list and working for the team as an advance scout, Percival's contract with the Tigers expired at the end of the 2006 season.

Though he didn't pitch a game during the Tigers' run to the American League Championship, the team voted Percival a ring and a full playoff share. Appreciative of this gesture, he used the money to buy a suite at Comerica Park for his teammates' wives.

In November and December 2006, during his time off from baseball, Percival funded and personally built a new clubhouse at the Riverside Sports Complex, the home venue of his college baseball program, UC Riverside.

=== St. Louis Cardinals ===
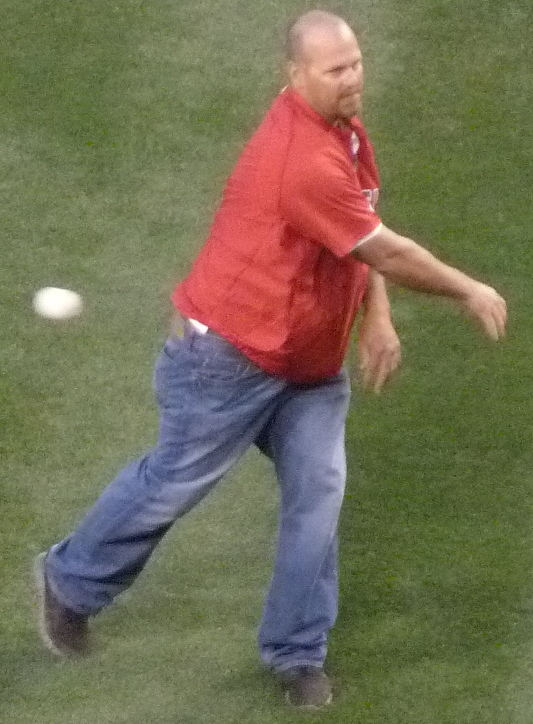
Percival throwing out the ceremonial first pitch before an Angels game in 2012

On January 19, 2007, the Los Angeles Angels of Anaheim hired Percival as a special assignment pitching instructor. However, believing his arm to have finally healed, he requested his release from his minor league coaching contract to pursue a comeback. Percival signed a contract with the St. Louis Cardinals and joined the major league team on June 26. Percival was the fourth member of the 2002 championship Angels team to play for the 2007 Cardinals, joining David Eckstein, Scott Spiezio, and Adam Kennedy, as well as former Angels teammate Jim Edmonds.

Percival made his first appearance in the Majors since 2005 on June 29, 2007, against the Cincinnati Reds. He struck out the first batter he faced, David Ross, and was also credited with the win.

=== Tampa Bay Rays ===
On November 29, 2007, Percival signed a two-year, $8 million contract with the Tampa Bay Rays. The contract contained up to $4 million in performance-based incentives. Percival was the team's primary closer in 2008.

On May 22, 2009, a day after allowing two runs in 1/3 of an inning against the Oakland Athletics, Percival was placed on Tampa Bay's disabled list. On August 11, he announced that he was likely to retire, and would cease his attempts at coming back from his injury.

== Coaching career ==
From 2010 to 2012, Percival was a volunteer pitching coach at Riverside Polytechnic High School. On September 24, 2012, Percival was hired as head varsity baseball coach at his alma mater, Moreno Valley High School. On July 26, 2014, he was named head coach of the UC Riverside baseball team. On November 11, 2020, Percival resigned as head coach of the Highlanders, citing the desire to help his son through the professional ranks as his reason for resignation.

On January 12, 2024, Percival was announced as the manager of the Idaho Falls Chukars of the Pioneer League. Following the 2025 season, Percival left Idaho Falls to manage the Pioneer League's expansion team in Long Beach, California.

== Head coaching record ==
Record table
Season	Team	Overall	Conference	Standing	Postseason
UC Riverside Highlanders (Big West Conference) (2015–2020)
2015	UC Riverside	15–40	4–20	9th	
2016	UC Riverside	26–29	12–12	T–4th	
2017	UC Riverside	22–32	8–16	T–7th	
2018	UC Riverside	19–33	7–17	8th	
2019	UC Riverside	20–36	8–16	T–7th	
2020	UC Riverside	9–7	0–0		Season canceled due to COVID-19
Total:		111–177			

== Personal life ==
Percival's son, Cole, was drafted by the Arizona Diamondbacks in the 31st round of the 2017 MLB draft.

== See also ==
- List of Major League Baseball career saves leaders
