= Reggie Sanders =

American baseball player (born 1967)

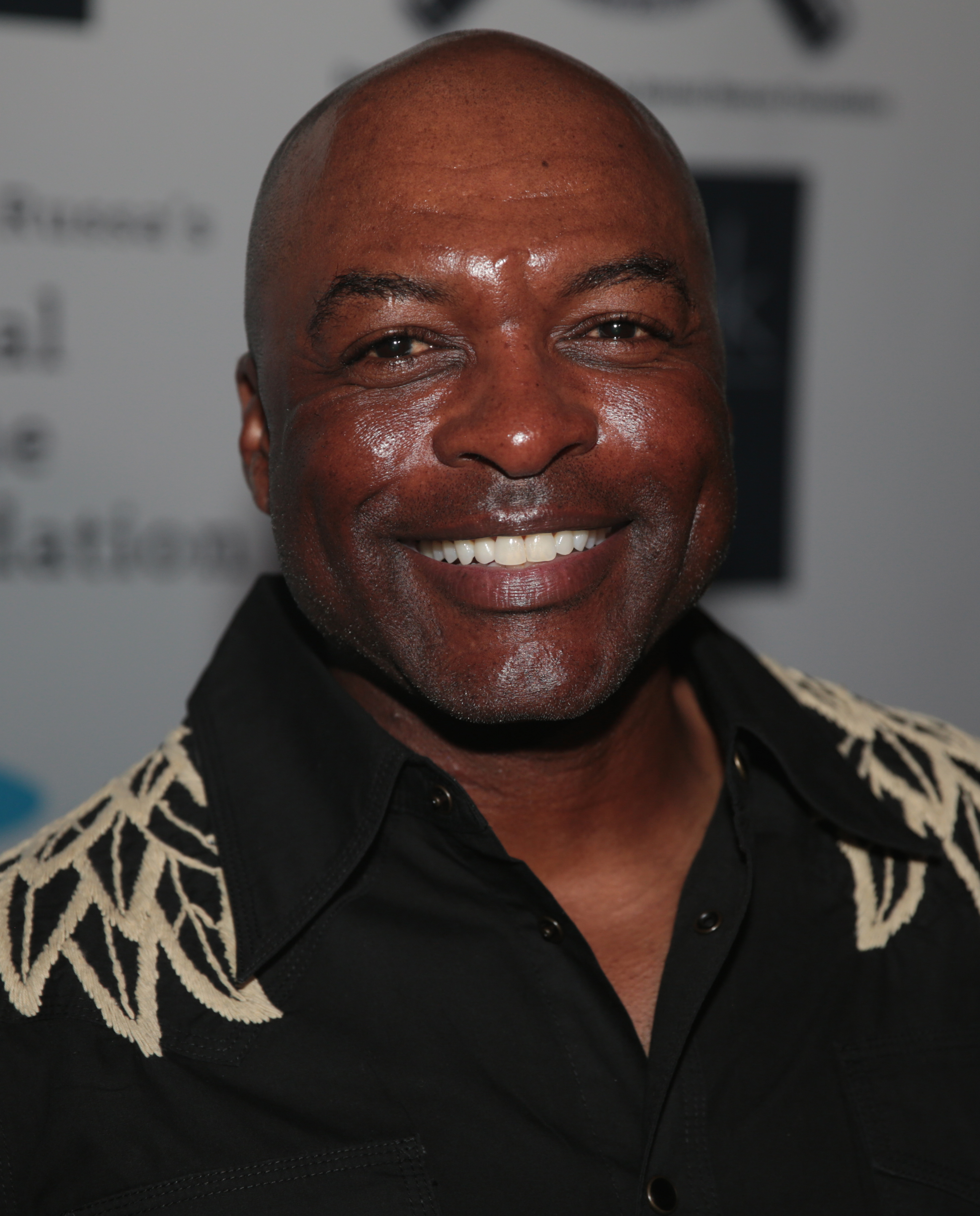
- Sanders in 2017
- Outfielder
- Born: December 1, 1967 (age 58); Florence, South Carolina, U.S.
- Batted: Right Threw: Right

MLB debut
- August 22, 1991, for the Cincinnati Reds

Last MLB appearance
- July 29, 2007, for the Kansas City Royals

MLB statistics
- Batting average: .267
- Home runs: 305
- Runs batted in: 983
- Stats at Baseball Reference

Teams
- Cincinnati Reds (1991–1998); San Diego Padres (1999); Atlanta Braves (2000); Arizona Diamondbacks (2001); San Francisco Giants (2002); Pittsburgh Pirates (2003); St. Louis Cardinals (2004–2005); Kansas City Royals (2006–2007)

Career highlights and awards
- All-Star (1995); World Series champion (2001); Cincinnati Reds Hall of Fame

Reginald Laverne Sanders (born December 1, 1967) is an American former right fielder in Major League Baseball and current executive for the Kansas City Royals. He batted and threw right-handed. He played professionally with the Cincinnati Reds, San Diego Padres, Atlanta Braves, Arizona Diamondbacks, San Francisco Giants, Pittsburgh Pirates, St. Louis Cardinals, and the Kansas City Royals.

He had his best batting year in the 1995 season when he batted .306 with 28 home runs; in over 800 games with the team, he batted .271 before he was traded in early 1999 to San Diego. He was traded after one season with the team to Atlanta and spent the next couple of years playing for teams on one-year deals. With the Diamondbacks in 2001, he had a career-high 33 home runs and had 14 hits in 16 postseason games as the team won the World Series for the first time in franchise history; Sanders reached the World Series twice more with San Francisco in 2002 and St. Louis in 2004. In the 2006 season with the Royals, Sanders recorded his 300th stolen base and 300th home run to become only the fifth player to record each statistic in MLB history. Injuries forced Sanders to play his final game in July 2007; in 1,777 games, Sanders had 1,666 hits with 305 home runs and 304 stolen bases. Possessing both power and speed, Sanders is one of eight MLB players to record over 300 home runs and over 300 stolen bases. He was inducted into the Cincinnati Reds Hall of Fame in 2025.

In 2017, Sanders was hired as a special assistant to baseball operations for player and staff engagement for the Kansas City Royals, where he currently serves.

== Early career ==
Sanders was 23 years old when he debuted in Major League Baseball (MLB) on August 22, 1991, after being selected in the seventh round of the 1987 MLB draft by the Cincinnati Reds. He attended Spartanburg Methodist College before beginning his pro career with the Rookie-level Billings Mustangs of the Pioneer League in 1988.

== Baseball career ==
=== Cincinnati Reds (1991–1998) ===
Sanders was called up to the majors in August 1991. He made his major league debut on August 22 versus the Atlanta Braves, going 0-for-4. He played in nine games that year and hit his first MLB home run on September 26 against Atlanta pitcher Armando Reynoso. The following year, he played more in the outfield, splitting between left and center field for 110 games (with a few pinch hit appearances). In 116 total games, he batted .270 with twelve home runs and 104 hits while striking out 98 times with 48 walks and stealing 16 bases on 23 attempts; he finished 4th in Rookie of the Year voting. He was put as the primary right fielder for 1993 and played 138 games while batting .274 with twenty home runs and 83 RBIs and 27 stolen bases on 37 attempts.

In the strike-shortened 1994 season, he batted just .263 while hitting 17 home runs with 21 stolen bases on 30 attempts but he also led the NL in strikeouts with 114. Sanders gained some notoriety during the 1994 season when Pedro Martínez hit him with a pitch to end his bid for a perfect game with one out in the eighth inning. Sanders responded by charging the mound and igniting a bench-clearing brawl. He was ridiculed by some in the press for believing that a pitcher would abandon an attempt at a perfect game to intentionally hit a batter. In 1995, crediting a decision to adjust his batting stance (where he moved his hands from high and back to low and toward the front of the plate) for timing, Sanders had a career year, playing in 133 games and batting a career high .306 with 99 RBIs while hitting 28 home runs and stealing 36 bases on 48 attempts to go with 148 hits and 69 walks (all except the home runs wound up being career highs for Sanders). The Reds won the NL Central title that year and Sanders played as the right fielder for each game of their postseason run. He batted .154 in the NLDS with one home run and nine strikeouts as the Reds won in a three-game sweep over the Dodgers. It did not get better for Sanders as the Reds met the Braves in the 1995 NLCS, as Sanders proceeded to bat .125 with two total hits and ten strikeouts as the Braves swept Cincinnati.

1996 saw him plagued with injuries that saw him go on the disabled list three times with a lower back strain in April, a sore rib cage in June, and torn ligaments in his right thumb in August. He played 81 total games and batted .251 with 14 home runs and 24 stolen bases. Sanders was plagued by further injuries the following year, having had a bulging disc in his lower back in April to then pair up with severely spraining his right ankle in late May 1997 while sliding into second base trying to avoid a game-ending double play. He played 86 games and batted .253 with 19 home runs and 13 stolen bases. He was healthier in 1998 for the Reds, playing in 135 games and batting .268 with 14 home runs and 20 stolen bases, although he struck out a career-high 137 times. On February 2, 1999, Sanders was traded by the Reds (along with Josh Harris and Damian Jackson) for Mark Sweeney and Greg Vaughn.

=== Five teams in five years (1999–2003) ===
In his one season with San Diego, he batted .285 in 133 games while having 26 home runs and 72 RBIs. On December 22, 1999, he was traded (alongside Wally Joyner and Quilvio Veras) to the Atlanta Braves for Bret Boone, Ryan Klesko and Jason Shiell. Sanders would play as a free agent for five different teams in the next five seasons. With Atlanta in 2000, he batted .232 in 103 games while playing mostly in left field but got to return to the postseason; in the NLDS, he went 0-for-9 with two walks as the Braves lost. With Arizona in 2001, he played 126 games and batted .263 with 90 RBIs and a career-high 33 home runs to go with 14 stolen bases as the Diamondbacks made a run to the World Series. Sanders got his first postseason home run in six years when he broke a scoreless tie in Game 5 of the NLDS versus St. Louis. It was his only RBI of that series, but Arizona won the game 2–1 to move on to the NLCS. Facing Atlanta, Sanders batted .118 while playing in right field, but Arizona won in five games anyway. In the 2001 World Series versus the New York Yankees, Sanders played the first six games in right field and batted .304 but stole just one base with one RBI. He didn't play in Game 7 due to being benched by manager Bob Brenly but Arizona won to give Sanders a World Series ring.

With San Francisco in 2002, he played 140 games and batted .250 while hitting 23 home runs with 18 stolen bases. He played in each of the 16 postseason games for the Giants in that year, which included the 2002 World Series. He hit a home run in both Game 1 and Game 2 of the series, but the Giants lost the series in seven games; Sanders had seven RBIs in the postseason, albeit with all but one being in the World Series. With Pittsburgh in 2003, he batted .285 while having 31 home runs and 15 stolen bases. On August 20, 2003, Sanders became one of a select group in MLB history to hit two home runs in an inning, doing so against the St. Louis Cardinals in the top of the 5th inning. He was only the third Pirates player to accomplish the feat. Sanders' first home run of the inning came as the third in a back-to-back-to-back string for the Pirates; the second was a grand slam.

=== Last years (2004–2007) ===
With St. Louis in 2004, he played in 135 games and batted .260 while hitting for 22 home runs with 21 stolen bases. He played in all but one of the postseason games during the trip to the World Series, which saw him have eight total hits with one RBI and go hitless in the World Series, which ended in a sweep for Boston. He returned to the Cards for 2005, which saw him bat .271 in just 93 games with 21 home runs and 14 stolen bases. Sanders had a breakout of sorts during the 2005 National League Division Series against the San Diego Padres. In a three-game sweep of the Padres, Sanders had ten runs batted in (with six coming in Game 1) a new record for a division series. In Game 1 of the 2005 NLCS, Sanders hit a two-run home run to give the Cardinals a two-run lead, making it his seventh career postseason home run. Sanders went cold from that game on however, having just two total hits after Game 1 as the Cardinals would lose the series in six games, giving the Houston Astros their first NL pennant and trip to the World Series.

Sanders played in 88 games and batted .246 with 11 home runs and 7 stolen bases as a free agent who signed with the Royals for 2006. On June 10, 2006, as a member of the Royals, Sanders hit his 300th home run. This made him the fifth member of Major League Baseball's 300-300 club, as he had stolen the 300th base of his career on May 1. He became the first player in history to join the club at his home stadium. Steve Finley of the San Francisco Giants joined the 300-300 club as its sixth member on June 14, four days after Sanders achieved the feat. Sanders missed the majority of the 2007 season due to an injury and became a free agent after the season. In what ended up as his final game on July 29, 2007, Sanders went 1-for-3, with his final hit being a single that scored a run in a 10–0 victory for Kansas City.

Sanders had eight 20-HR seasons in his career, doing so for six different teams. He hit at least 10 home runs in a season for every major league team he played for (eight in all).

On December 16, 2025, Sanders was elected to the Cincinnati Reds Hall of Fame.

== Career statistics ==
Years	Games	PA	AB	R	H	2B	3B	HR	RBI	SB	BB	SO	AVG	OBP	SLG	FLD%
17	1,777	7043	6,241	1,037	1,666	341	60	305	983	304	674	1,614	.267	.343	.487	.981

In 64 postseason games, Sanders batted .195 (43-for-221) with 24 runs, 7 home runs, 25 RBI, 9 stolen bases, and 26 walks.

== See also ==
- List of Major League Baseball career home run leaders
- List of Major League Baseball career runs scored leaders
