= Scott Spiezio =

American baseball player (born 1972)

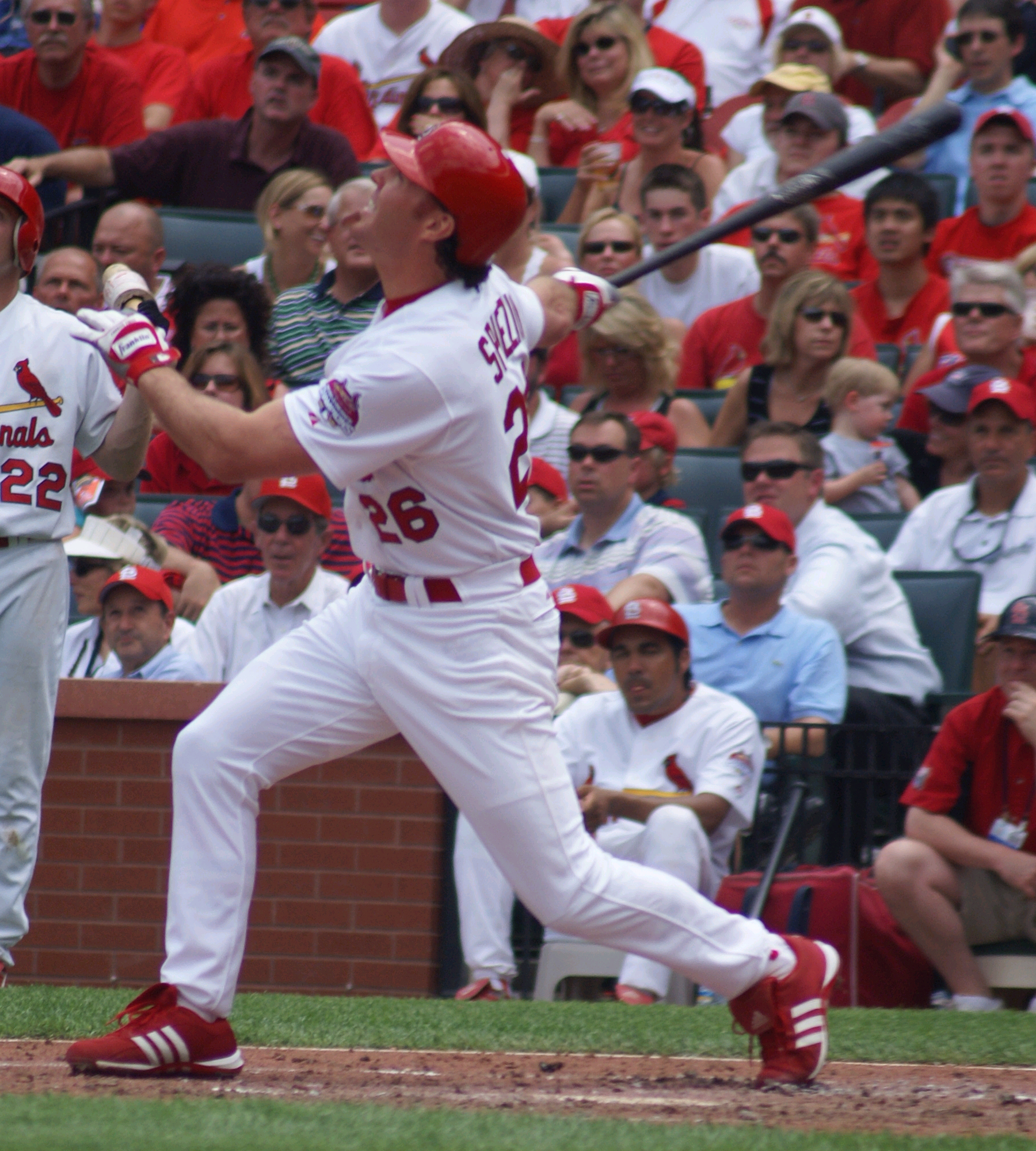
- Spiezio with the Cardinals in 2006
- Infielder
- Born: September 21, 1972 (age 54); Joliet, Illinois, U.S.
- Batted: Switch Threw: Right

MLB debut
- September 14, 1996, for the Oakland Athletics

Last MLB appearance
- September 30, 2007, for the St. Louis Cardinals

MLB statistics
- Batting average: .255
- Home runs: 119
- Runs batted in: 549
- Stats at Baseball Reference

Teams
- Oakland Athletics (1996–1999); Anaheim Angels (2000–2003); Seattle Mariners (2004–2005); St. Louis Cardinals (2006–2007)

Career highlights and awards
- 2× World Series champion (2002, 2006)
Medals
Men's baseball
Representing United States
World Junior Baseball Championship
Bronze medal – third place	1990 Cuba	Team

Scott Edward Spiezio (/ˈspiːzi.oʊ/ SPEE-zee-oh) is an American former professional baseball infielder. He is well known for his time as a member of the Anaheim Angels, when he hit a three-run home run in Game Six of the 2002 World Series against the San Francisco Giants, sparking the Angels to a dramatic come-from-behind victory. He also played in Major League Baseball (MLB) for the Oakland Athletics, Seattle Mariners, and St. Louis Cardinals, and is the son of former major leaguer Ed Spiezio.

In addition to Spiezio's pivotal moment helping the Angels win the World Series, 2002 was also his most productive full season, with a .807 OPS. Spiezio was a utility player on the St. Louis Cardinals 2006 World Series championship team.

== Amateur career ==
Spiezio attended Morris High School in Morris, Illinois, and was a letterman in baseball. In baseball, he was named his league's MVP and was an All-State selection.

Spiezio played college baseball for the University of Illinois at Urbana–Champaign. He made the All-Big 10 Team in baseball in 1992 and 1993. In 1992, he played collegiate summer baseball with the Wareham Gatemen of the Cape Cod Baseball League, and returned to the league in 1993 to play for the Cotuit Kettleers.

== Professional career ==
=== Oakland A's ===
Spiezio was selected by the Oakland Athletics in the 1993 player draft and signed later that year. He made his debut with the 1996 A's and established himself as a classic utility player, making starts at first base, second base, and third base, and as a switch hitter with more power when batting left-handed.

=== Anaheim Angels ===
Spiezio signed as a free agent with the Anaheim Angels ahead of the 2000 season. During his years with the Angels, he made appearances in left field and right field, as well as first, second, and third base. In 2002, he had a career year. Playing every day, he set career highs in batting average, on-base percentage and RBI. It was in the postseason that he had his greatest success. Spiezio batted 18 for 55 (.327) for Anaheim in the playoffs that year. In Game 6 of the 2002 World Series, with Anaheim trailing three games to two in the series, trailing 5–0 in the seventh inning of the game, and facing a Series loss, Spiezio hit a three-run homer off of Félix Rodríguez to pull his team to within two runs. A lead off homer by Darin Erstad followed by a two-run double by Troy Glaus in the next inning won the game for the Angels by a 6–5 score, and the Angels would go on to win their first ever World Series championship 4–3. Spiezio tied Sandy Alomar Jr.'s postseason record with 19 RBI in one postseason that was set in 1997.

=== Seattle Mariners ===
After the 2003 season, Spiezio became a free agent and signed a contract with the Seattle Mariners. The next two seasons were the worst of his career. He tripped over a mound during 2004 spring training, resulting in a debilitating back injury. At one point, there were concerns the injury could threaten his career and potentially leave him paralyzed. He hit .215 that season and played only 29 games the next year (compiling an .064 average) before the Mariners released him on August 19, 2005.

=== St. Louis Cardinals ===
On February 18, 2006, Spiezio signed a minor league contract with the St. Louis Cardinals with an invitation to the club's spring training. Spiezio played well enough during the Cardinals' exhibition to secure a roster spot with the team as a reserve infielder entering the 2006 season. This move would reunite Spiezio with his former Angels teammate, shortstop David Eckstein.

Spiezio, used as a pinch hitter and all-around reserve player as well as the primary backup to Scott Rolen at third base, had his best season since 2002 for the 2006 Cardinals, hitting 13 home runs and driving in 52 runs despite only getting 276 at-bats. He would have another dramatic moment in the playoffs. With the Cardinals trailing, 6–4, in the seventh inning of Game 2 of the 2006 National League Championship Series, Spiezio hit a two-run triple to tie the score. The Cardinals went on to win the game and the series in seven games, then proceeded to win the 2006 World Series, earning Spiezio his second World Series ring.

On November 16, 2006, Spiezio signed a two-year contract to return to the Cardinals until the end of the 2008 season, with a club option for 2009. The deal was worth an estimated $4.5 million.

On June 15, 2007, Spiezio took the mound as a relief pitcher in the bottom of the eighth inning of a lopsided loss against the Athletics. His fastball was clocked as high as 87 mph. He pitched one inning, giving up one walk, no hits, no runs, and no strikeouts. After having pitched in one game, Spiezio played six positions in his career (seven counting designated hitter), missing catcher, shortstop, and center field.

=== Release ===
On August 7, 2007, Spiezio received IV fluids. He was described as being "irritable and anxious". Spiezio disconnected his IV and left the stadium rather than accept medical treatment. On August 9, 2007, the Cardinals placed him on the restricted list. The Cardinals stated that Spiezio would be seeking treatment for an unspecified substance abuse problem. On September 14, 2007, Spiezio was removed from the restricted list after 36 days and also reactivated to play in that evening's home game.

On February 27, 2008, the Cardinals released Spiezio after police in Irvine, California issued a warrant for his arrest. The warrant was issued on six charges relating to a car crash on December 30, 2007. According to Irvine police, a drunken Spiezio crashed his BMW into a fence, then ran from the scene. In April, he pleaded guilty to two misdemeanors and was sentenced to three years' probation and 80 hours community service. He was also ordered to undergo three months of alcohol treatment and attend Alcoholics Anonymous meetings.

On March 31, 2008, Spiezio signed a minor league deal with the Atlanta Braves and was assigned to their top affiliate, the Richmond Braves. He showed signs of his old form, batting .333 in five games. However, he was released on April 12 for being unprepared to play in a game. Spiezio later said that while he was sober at the time, he was in a deep depression after being released by the Cardinals and wasn't ready to take the field. Combined with a strained relationship with his first wife and the prospect of not being able to see his kids for two months, he decided to go home for the year.

=== Independent leagues ===
Spiezio believed he was finished with baseball after his major league career, but decided to give it another shot in 2009. The Angels put him in touch with the Orange County Flyers of the independent Golden Baseball League. Flyers manager Phil Nevin, a former major leaguer, decided to sign Spiezio after letting him work out for a week and getting assurances he was mentally ready to play. Spiezio signed another one-year deal to play the 2010 season for the Newark Bears. He hit .279 with three home runs and 35 RBI while appearing in 52 games.

== Personal life ==
Spiezio is the son of two-time World Series champion Ed Spiezio.

On April 7, 2015, at 2:30 AM, police in Ottawa, Illinois, responded to a call that Spiezio punched out a window at the apartment where his then-girlfriend and infant son lived. Spiezio fled police and was later found through the use of a K-9 tracker behind a building, resulting in him being tased in order to be brought into custody. No charges were immediately filed.

In a 2022 interview with The Athletic, Spiezio revealed that he had spent the better part of 13 years battling substance abuse. He traced his downward spiral to the 2004 spring training injury, when the strain of being sidelined led him to begin drinking heavily, eventually drinking as much as a gallon of vodka per day. Over the years, he also became a cocaine addict. He admitted that during his time with the Cardinals, he frequently drank during games. As early as 2006, he had alienated so many of his friends in his hometown that no one joined him to celebrate the 2006 World Series win; in contrast, his friends threw him a huge party after the 2002 Series. By 2022, he had 12 stints in rehab and five arrests. His drug habit cost him both of his marriages and strained relationships with his family. His parents did not speak to him at all from 2005 to 2007 and had only sporadic contact with him from 2007 to 2011. He finally bottomed out in 2018, when he went to the hospital with severe jaundice from a badly damaged liver. He has been sober since then.

== See also ==
- List of second-generation Major League Baseball players
