= Los Angeles Angels award winners and league leaders =

This is a list of award winners and league leaders for the Los Angeles Angels professional baseball team.

== Awards ==
=== Most Valuable Player ===
- Don Baylor (1979)
- Vladimir Guerrero (2004)
- Mike Trout (2014, 2016, 2019)
- Shohei Ohtani (2021, 2023)

=== Cy Young ===
- Dean Chance (1964)
- Bartolo Colón (2005)

=== Rookie of the Year ===
- Tim Salmon (1993)
- Mike Trout (2012)
- Shohei Ohtani (2018)

=== Hank Aaron Award ===
- Mike Trout (2014, 2019)
- Shohei Ohtani (2023)

=== Edgar Martínez Award ===
- Shohei Ohtani (2021, 2022, 2023)

=== AL Manager of the Year ===
See footnote

- Mike Scioscia (2002, 2009)

=== All-MLB Team ===
- Mike Trout (1st team OF – 2019, 2020, 2022)
- Shohei Ohtani (1st team DH and 2nd team SP – 2021, 1st team SP and 2nd team DH – 2022, 1st team DH and 1st team SP – 2023)
- Raisel Iglesias (2nd team RP – 2021)

=== Gold Glove Award ===
- Vic Power (1964)
- Bobby Knoop (1966, 1967, 1968)
- Jim Fregosi (1967)
- Jim Spencer (1970)
- Ken Berry (1972)
- Rick Miller (1978)
- Bob Boone (1982, 1986, 1987, 1988)
- Gary Pettis (1985, 1986)
- Devon White (1988, 1989)
- Mark Langston (1991, 1992, 1993, 1994, 1995)
- J. T. Snow (1995, 1996)
- Jim Edmonds (1997, 1998)
- Darin Erstad (2000, 2002, 2004)
- Bengie Molina (2002, 2003)
- Orlando Cabrera (2007)
- Torii Hunter (2008, 2009)
- Erick Aybar (2011)
- Kole Calhoun (2015)
- Martin Maldonado (2017)
- Andrelton Simmons (2017, 2018)
- Griffin Canning (2020)

=== Wilson Overall Defensive Player of the Year ===
See explanatory note at Atlanta Braves award winners and league leaders.

- Mike Trout (in American League) (2012)

=== Wilson Defensive Player of the Year Award ===
Team (all positions)

- Mike Trout (2012)
- J. B. Shuck (2013)

=== Silver Slugger Award ===
- Bobby Grich (1981)
- Rick Burleson (1981)
- Doug DeCinces (1982)
- Reggie Jackson (1982)
- Lance Parrish (1990)
- Tim Salmon (1995)
- Darin Erstad (2000)
- Troy Glaus (2000, 2001)
- Garret Anderson (2002, 2003)
- Vladimir Guerrero (2004, 2005, 2006, 2007)
- Torii Hunter (2009)
- Mike Trout (2012, 2013, 2014, 2015, 2016, 2018, 2019, 2020, 2022)
- Justin Upton (2017)
- Shohei Ohtani (2021, 2023)

=== MLB "This Year in Baseball Awards" ===
Note: These awards were renamed the "GIBBY Awards" in 2010 and then the "Esurance MLB Awards" in 2015.

==== "GIBBY Awards" Best Everyday Player ====
- 2014 – Mike Trout

=== World Series MVP Award ===
- 2002 – Troy Glaus

=== ALCS MVP Award ===
See: League Championship Series Most Valuable Player Award

- 1982 – Fred Lynn
- 2002 – Adam Kennedy

=== All-Star Game MVP Award ===
Note: This was re-named the Ted Williams Most Valuable Player Award in 2002.

- 1962 – Leon Wagner
- 1983 – Fred Lynn
- 2003 – Garret Anderson
- 2014, 2015 - Mike Trout

=== All-Star Game—Home Run Derby champion ===
See: Home Run Derby

- 1986 – Wally Joyner
- 2003 – Garret Anderson
- 2007 – Vladimir Guerrero

=== DHL Hometown Heroes (2006) ===
- Rod Carew — voted by MLB fans as the most outstanding player in the history of the franchise, based on on-field performance, leadership quality and character value

Franchise Four (2015)

- Vladimir Guerrero
- Nolan Ryan
- Tim Salmon
- Mike Trout

=== Baseball America Major League Player of the Year ===
- Mike Trout (2012, 2013, 2016)

=== Baseball America All-Rookie Team ===
See: Baseball America#Baseball America All-Rookie Team

- 2011 – Jordan Walden (RP; one of two)

=== Topps All-Star Rookie teams ===
- 1961 — Lee Thomas (OF)
- 1962 — Dean Chance (RHP) & Buck Rodgers (C)
- 1965 — Jose Cardenal (OF), Marcelino Lopez (LHP) & Paul Schaal (3B)
- 1974 — Frank Tanana (LHP)
- 1975 — Jerry Remy (2B)
- 1979 — Mark Clear (RHP)
- 1986 — Wally Joyner (1B)
- 1987 — Devon White (OF)
- 1989 — Jim Abbott (LHP)
- 1993 — Tim Salmon (OF) & J. T. Snow (1B)
- 1994 — Brian Anderson (LHP)
- 1995 — Garret Anderson (OF)
- 1997 — Jason Dickson (RHP) & Mike Holtz (LHP)
- 2000 — Adam Kennedy (2B) & Bengie Molina (C)
- 2001 — Shawn Wooten (C)
- 2011 — Mark Trumbo (1B)
- 2012 — Mike Trout (OF)
- 2018 — Shohei Ohtani (P/DH)
- 2020 — Jared Walsh (1B)
- 2022 — Reid Detmers (LHP)

=== Branch Rickey Award ===
- 2009 — Torii Hunter

=== The Sporting News Manager of the Year Award ===
See footnote

- Bill Rigney (1962) (in both leagues)
- Mike Scioscia (2002, 2009) (in AL)

=== Baseball America Manager of the Year ===
See: Baseball America#Major League Baseball awards
See footnote

- Mike Scioscia (2002, 2009)

=== Associated Press Manager of the Year ===
See: Associated Press#AP sports awards
See footnote

- Bill Rigney (1962) (in AL)

== Team award ==
- 2002 – William Harridge Trophy (American League champion)
- 2002 – Commissioner's Trophy (World Series)
- 2003 (2002 Anaheim Angels) – Outstanding Team ESPY Award

== Minor-league system ==
=== Baseball America Minor League Player of the Year Award ===
- 1992 – Tim Salmon (Edmonton Trappers; AAA)
- 2011 – Mike Trout (Arkansas Travelers; AA)

=== Minor League Baseball Yearly (MiLBY) Awards Hitter of the Year ===
- 2008 – Roberto Lopez (Orem Owlz)

=== Sporting News Minor League Organization of the Year ===
- 2003 – Los Angeles Angels of Anaheim

=== Minor League News Farm System of the Year ===
- 2007 – Los Angeles Angels of Anaheim

== Other achievements ==
=== Hall of Famers ===
See: Los Angeles Angels of Anaheim#Baseball Hall of Famers

=== Angels Hall of Fame ===
See: Los Angeles Angels of Anaheim#Angels Hall of Fame

=== California Sports Hall of Fame ===
Los Angeles Angels in the California Sports Hall of Fame
No.	Name	Position(s)	Seasons	Notes
32	Dave Winfield	RF	1990–1991	Elected mainly on his performance with San Diego Padres
36	Fernando Valenzuela	P	1991	Elected mainly on his performance with Los Angeles Dodgers
44	Reggie Jackson	RF	1982–1986	Elected mainly on his performance with Oakland Athletics and New York Yankees

=== Retired numbers ===
See: Los Angeles Angels of Anaheim#Retired numbers

=== Gene Autry Trophy ===
The Gene Autry Trophy, named for former Angels owner Gene Autry, is given to the team most valuable player. The award is voted on by the players.

Year	Winner
1990	Chuck Finley
1991	Jim Abbott & Bryan Harvey
1992	Luis Polonia
1993	Mark Langston & Tim Salmon (1)
1994	Chili Davis
1995	Tim Salmon (2)
1996	Troy Percival
1997	Tim Salmon (3)
1998	Gary DiSarcina
1999	Garret Anderson (1)
2000	Darin Erstad
2001	Garret Anderson (2)
2002	Garret Anderson (3)
2003	Garret Anderson (4)
2004	Vladimir Guerrero
2005	Chone Figgins & Bartolo Colón
2006	Vladimir Guerrero (2)
2007	Vladimir Guerrero (3)
2008	Francisco Rodriguez
2012	Mike Trout
2013	Mike Trout (2)
2014	Mike Trout (3)
2015	Mike Trout (4)
2016	Mike Trout (5)
2017	Andrelton Simmons & Mike Trout (6)
2018	Mike Trout (7)
2019	Mike Trout (8)
2020	Mike Trout (9)
2021	Shohei Ohtani
2022	Shohei Ohtani

=== Nick Adenhart Award ===
The Nick Adenhart Pitcher of the Year Award, named for former Angels player Nick Adenhart, is given to an Angels pitcher for outstanding performance throughout the regular season. The award is voted on by the players.

Year	Winner
2015	Huston Street
2017	Yusmeiro Petit
2018	Andrew Heaney
2019	Andrew Heaney (2)
2020	Dylan Bundy
2021	Shohei Ohtani
2022	Shohei Ohtani
2023	Carlos Estevez

== American League statistical leaders (batting) ==
=== Batting Average ===
- Alex Johnson .329 (1970)

=== Slugging Percentage ===
- Bobby Grich .543 (1981)
- Mike Trout .590 (2015)
- Mike Trout .629 (2017)
- Shohei Ohtani .654 (2023)

=== On Base Percentage ===
- Mike Trout .441 (2016)
- Mike Trout .442 (2017)
- Mike Trout .460 (2018)
- Mike Trout .438 (2019)
- Shohei Ohtani .412 (2023)

=== OPS+ ===
- Bobby Grich 165 (1981)
- Mike Trout 168 (2012)
- Mike Trout 176 (2015)
- Mike Trout 173 (2016)
- Mike Trout 186 (2017)
- Mike Trout 198 (2018)
- Mike Trout 182 (2019)
- Shohei Ohtani 184 (2023)

=== Games ===
- Sandy Alomar Sr. 162 (1970) Co-Leader
- Sandy Alomar Sr. 162 (1971)
- Don Baylor 162 (1979) Co-Leader
- Rick Burleson 109 (1981) Co-Leader

=== At Bats ===
- Sandy Alomar Sr. 689 (1971)
- Darin Erstad 676 (2000)

=== Runs ===
- Albie Pearson 115 (1962)
- Don Baylor 120 (1979)
- Vladimir Guerrero 124 (2004)
- Mike Trout 129 (2012)
- Mike Trout 109 (2013)
- Mike Trout 115 (2014)
- Mike Trout 123 (2016)

=== Hits ===
- Darin Erstad 240 (2000)

=== Total Bases ===
- Vladimir Guerrero 366 (2004)
- Mike Trout 338 (2014)
- Shohei Ohtani 325 (2023) American League

=== Doubles ===
- Garret Anderson 56 (2002) Co-Leader
- Garret Anderson 49 (2003) Co-Leader

=== Triples ===
- Bobby Knoop 11 (1966)
- Jim Fregosi 13 (1968)
- Mickey Rivers 11 (1974)
- Mickey Rivers 13 (1975) Co-Leader
- Shohei Ohtani 8 (2021) Co-Leader

=== Home Runs ===
- Bobby Grich 22 (1981) Co-Leader
- Reggie Jackson 39 (1982) Co-Leader
- Troy Glaus 47 (2000)
- Shohei Ohtani 44 (2023) American League

=== RBI ===
- Don Baylor 139 (1979)
- Mike Trout 111 (2014)

=== Walks ===
- Brian Downing 106 (1987) Co-Leader
- Mike Trout 110 (2013)
- Mike Trout 116 (2016)
- Mike Trout 122 (2018)

=== Strikeouts ===
- Reggie Jackson 156 (1982)
- Mo Vaughn 181 (2000)
- Mike Trout 184 (2014)

=== Stolen Bases ===
- Mickey Rivers 70 (1975)
- Mike Trout 49 (2012)

=== Caught Stealing ===
- Chad Curtis 24 (1993)
- Shohei Ohtani 10 (2021)

=== Singles ===
- Albie Pearson 139 (1963)
- Alex Johnson 156 (1970)
- Garret Anderson 142 (1997) Co-Leader
- Darin Erstad 170 (2000)

=== Hit By Pitch ===
- Rick Reichardt 13 (1966)
- Don Baylor 18 (1978)
- David Eckstein 21 (2001)
- David Eckstein 27 (2002)

=== Sacrifice Hits ===
- Jim Fregosi 15 (1965)
- Tim Foli 26 (1982)
- Luis Sojo 19 (1991)
- David Eckstein 16 (2001)
- David Eckstein 14 (2002)

=== Sacrifice Flies ===
- Bobby Knoop 7 (1966) Co-Leader
- Roger Repoz 8 (1968) Co-Leader
- Don Baylor 12 (1978)
- Dan Ford 13 (1979) Co-Leader
- Carney Lansford 11 (1980)
- Wally Joyner 12 (1986)
- Chili Davis 10 (1988) Co-Leader

=== Intentional Walks ===
- Vladimir Guerrero 26 (2005)
- Vladimir Guerrero 25 (2006)
- Vladimir Guerrero 28 (2007)
- Vladimir Guerrero 16 (2008)
- Mike Trout 15 (2017)
- Mike Trout 25 (2018)
- Shohei Ohtani 20 (2021)

=== Grounded into Double Plays ===
- Lyman Bostock 26 (1978)
- Vladimir Guerrero 27 (2008)
- Albert Pujols 28 (2014)
- Albert Pujols 26 (2017)

=== At Bats per Strikeout ===
- Tim Foli 21.8 (1982)
- Bengie Molina 14.3 (2000)
- David Eckstein 11.6 (2004)

=== At Bats per Home Run ===
- Bobby Grich 16.0 (1981)
- Reggie Jackson 13.6 (1982)

=== Outs ===
- Sandy Alomar Sr. 536 (1971)
- Devon White 517 (1989)
- Chad Curtis 369 (1994)

=== Runs Created ===
- Vladimir Guerrero 140 (2004)
- Mike Trout 155 (2013)
- Mike Trout 137 (2014)

=== Adj. On-Base Plus Slugging ===
- Bobby Grich 165 (1981)
- Mike Trout 171 (2012)

=== Adj. Batting Runs ===
- Vladimir Guerrero 51 (2004)
- Mike Trout 56 (2014)

=== Adj. Batting Wins ===
- Vladimir Guerrero 4.7 (2004)
- Mike Trout 5.6 (2014)

=== Power-Speed Number ===
- Bobby Bonds 38.9 (1977)
- Darin Erstad 26.4 (2000)
- Mike Trout 37.2 (2012)
- Mike Trout 29.7 (2013)
- Shohei Ohtani 33.2 (2021)

=== Offensive Win Perc. ===
- Mike Trout .786 (2012)

=== Win Probability Added ===
- Mike Trout 5.3 (2012)
- Mike Trout 6.9 (2014)
- Shohei Ohtani 5.1 (2021)

=== Wins Above Replacement (Baseball Reference) ===
- Dean Chance 8.6 (1964)
- Mike Trout 10.9 (2012)
- Mike Trout 8.9 (2013)
- Mike Trout 7.9 (2014)
- Shohei Ohtani 9.1 (2021)

=== Wins Above Replacement for Position Players (Baseball-Reference) ===
- Mike Trout 10.9 (2012)
- Mike Trout 8.9 (2013)
- Mike Trout 7.9 (2014)

=== Offensive Wins Above Replacement (Baseball Reference) ===
- Tim Salmon 7.2 (1995) Co-Leader
- Mike Trout 8.8 (2012)
- Mike Trout 9.7 (2013)
- Mike Trout 8.7 (2014)

== American League statistical leaders (pitching) ==
=== ERA ===
- Dean Chance 1.65 (1964)
- Frank Tanana 2.54 (1977)
- John Lackey 3.01 (2007)

=== Wins ===
- Dean Chance 20 (1964) Co-Leader (A.L CY YOUNG WINNER)
- Bartolo Colón 21 (2005)
- Jered Weaver 20 (2012) Co-Leader
- Jered Weaver 18 (2014) Co-Leader

=== WHIP ===
- Frank Tanana 0.988 (1976)
- Jered Weaver 1.018 (2012)

=== Hits Allowed/9IP ===
- Andy Messersmith 6.08 (1969)
- Andy Messersmith 6.66 (1970)
- Nolan Ryan 5.26 (1972)
- Nolan Ryan 5.98 (1974)
- Nolan Ryan 6.11 (1976)
- Nolan Ryan 5.96 (1977)
- Nolan Ryan 6.83 (1979)
- Jered Weaver 7.01 (2012)

=== Strikeouts/9IP ===
- Nolan Ryan 10.43 (1972)
- Nolan Ryan 10.57 (1973)
- Nolan Ryan 9.93 (1974)
- Frank Tanana 9.41 (1975)
- Nolan Ryan 10.35 (1976)
- Nolan Ryan 10.26 (1977)
- Nolan Ryan 9.97 (1978)
- Nolan Ryan 9.01 (1979)
- Shohei Ohtani 11.9 (2021)

=== FIP ===
- Andy Messersmith 2.35 (1972)

=== Saves ===
- Minnie Rojas 27 (1967)
- Bryan Harvey 46 (1991)
- Francisco Rodríguez 45 (2005) Co-Leader
- Francisco Rodríguez 47 (2006)
- Francisco Rodríguez 62 (2008) MLB RECORD

=== Innings ===
- Dean Chance 278 1/3 (1964)
- Nolan Ryan 332 2/3 (1974)
- Chuck Finley 183 1/3 (1994)

=== Strikeouts ===
- Nolan Ryan 329 (1972)
- Nolan Ryan 383 (1973)MLB RECORD
- Nolan Ryan 367 (1974)
- Frank Tanana 269 (1975)
- Nolan Ryan 327 (1976)
- Nolan Ryan 341 (1977)
- Nolan Ryan 260 (1978)
- Nolan Ryan 223 (1979)
- Jered Weaver 233 (2010)

=== Games Started ===
- Chuck Finley 25 (1994) Co-Leader
- Jered Weaver 34 (2010)
- Jered Weaver 34 (2014)

=== Complete Games ===
- Dean Chance 15 (1964)
- Nolan Ryan 22 (1977) Co-Leader
- Chuck Finley 13 (1993)

=== Shutouts ===
- Dean Chance 11 (1964)
- Jim McGlothlin 6 (1967) Co-Leader
- Nolan Ryan 9 (1972)
- Nolan Ryan 7 (1976)
- Frank Tanana 7 (1977)
- Nolan Ryan 5 (1979) Co-Leader
- Ken Forsch 4 (1981) Co-Leader
- Geoff Zahn 5 (1984) Co-Leader
- Bert Blyleven 5 (1989)
- John Lackey 2 (2003) Co-Leader
- John Lackey 2 (2006)
- John Lackey 2 (2007)

=== Win/Loss Percentage ===
- Jered Weaver .800 (2012)

=== Home Runs Allowed ===
- Geoff Zahn 18 (1981) Co-Leader
- Willie Fraser 33 (1988)
- Shawn Boskie 40 (1996) Co-Leader
- Allen Watson 37 (1997)
- Ramón Ortiz 40 (2002)
- Jarrod Washburn 34 (2003) Co-Leader
- Ervin Santana 39 (2012)

=== Walks Allowed ===
- Bo Belinsky 122 (1962)
- Dean Chance 114 (1966)
- Nolan Ryan 157 (1972)
- Nolan Ryan 162 (1973)
- Nolan Ryan 202 (1974)
- Nolan Ryan 183 (1976)
- Nolan Ryan 204 (1977)
- Nolan Ryan 148 (1978)

=== Hits Allowed ===
- Tommy John 287 (1983)
- Jim Abbott 246 (1990)

=== Strikeout to Walk ===
- Frank Tanana 3.68 (1975)
- Frank Tanana 3.58 (1976)

=== Losses ===
- George Brunet 19 (1967)
- George Brunet 17 (1968)
- Nolan Ryan 18 (1976)
- Kirk McCaskill 19 (1991)
- Jim Abbott 18 (1996)

=== Earned Runs Allowed ===
- Geoff Zahn 79 (1981)
- Mike Witt 111 (1989) Co-Leader

=== Wild Pitches ===
- Andy Messersmith 16 (1969) Co-Leader
- Tom Murphy 16 (1969) Co-Leader
- Tom Murphy 17 (1971)
- Nolan Ryan 18 (1972)
- Nolan Ryan 21 (1977)
- Nolan Ryan 13 (1978)
- Chuck Finley 17 (1996)
- Chuck Finley 15 (1999)

=== Hit Batsmen ===
- Ken McBride 14 (1963)
- Ken McBride 16 (1964)
- Marcelino López 9 (1966)
- Tom Murphy 21 (1969)
- Mike Witt 11 (1981) Co-Leader
- Ken Forsch 11 (1982)
- Mark Leiter 9 (1994)
- Shawn Boskie 13 (1996) Co-Leader
- Jason Grimsley 13 (1996 Co-Leader)

=== Batters Faced ===
- Nolan Ryan 1,392 (1974)
- Nolan Ryan 1,272 (1977)
- Chuck Finley 774 (1994)

=== Games Finished ===
- Minnie Rojas 53 (1967)
- Bryan Harvey 63 (1991)
- Francisco Rodríguez 69 (2008)

=== Oldest Player ===
- Art Fowler 41 (1964)
- Hoyt Wilhelm 46 (1969)
- Orlando Peña 40 (1974)
- Orlando Peña 41 (1975)
- Mike Cuellar 40 (1977)
- Ron Fairly 39 (1978)
- Andrés Galarraga 43 (2004)

=== Youngest Player ===
- Ed Kirkpatrick 17 (1962)
- Willie Montañez 18 (1966)
- Lloyd Allen 19 (1969)
- Brian Harper 19 (1979)
- Miguel García 20 (1987)
- Francisco Rodríguez 20 (2002)
- Mike Trout 19 (2011)

== All-Star Game selections ==
Pitcher

- Tyler Anderson (2024)
- Dean Chance (1964)
- Mark Clear (1979)
- Bartolo Colón (2005)
- Jason Dickson (1997)
- Brendan Donnelly (2003)
- Ryne Duren (1961^{1})
- Carlos Estévez (2023)
- Chuck Finley [4] (1989, 1990, 1995, 1996)
- Ken Forsch (1981)
- Brian Fuentes (2009)
- Bryan Harvey (1991)
- Yusei Kikuchi (2025)
- John Lackey (2007)
- Mark Langston [3] (1991, 1992, 1993)
- Dave LaRoche (1977)
- Bob Lee (1965)
- Ken McBride [3] (1961^{2}, 1962^{2}, 1963)
- Jim McGlothlin (1967)
- Andy Messersmith (1971)
- Donnie Moore (1985)
- Shohei Ohtani [3] (2021, 2022, 2023)
- Troy Percival [4] (1996, 1998, 1999, 2001)
- Francisco Rodríguez [3] (2004, 2007, 2008)
- Nolan Ryan [5] (1972, 1973, 1975, 1977, 1979)
- Ervin Santana (2008)
- Héctor Santiago (2015)
- Joe Saunders (2008)
- Bill Singer (1973)
- Lee Smith (1995)
- Frank Tanana [3] (1976, 1977, 1978)
- Jordan Walden (2011)
- Jered Weaver [3] (2010, 2011, 2012)
- C. J. Wilson (2012)
- Mike Witt [2] (1986, 1987)
- Clyde Wright (1970)

Catcher

- Bob Boone (1983)
- Brian Downing (1979)
- Lance Parrish (1990)

First baseman

- Rod Carew [6] (1979, 1980, 1981, 1982, 1983, 1984)
- Albert Pujols (2015)
- Wally Joyner (1986)
- Don Mincher (1967)
- Jared Walsh (2021)

Second baseman

- Sandy Alomar Sr. (1970)
- Bobby Grich [3] (1979, 1980, 1982)
- Howie Kendrick (2011)
- Bobby Knoop (1966)
- Tommy La Stella (2019)
- Billy Moran [2] (1962^{1}, 1962^{2})
- Johnny Ray (1988)

Third baseman

- Dave Chalk [2] (1974, 1975)
- Doug DeCinces (1983)
- Chone Figgins (2009)
- Troy Glaus [3] (2000, 2001, 2003)

Shortstop

- Erick Aybar (2014)
- Rick Burleson (1981)
- Gary DiSarcina (1995)
- Jim Fregosi [6] (1964, 1966, 1967, 1968, 1969, 1970)

Outfielder

- Garret Anderson [3] (2002, 2003, 2005)
- Don Baylor (1979)
- Jim Edmonds (1995)
- Darin Erstad [2] (1998, 2000)
- Vladimir Guerrero [4] (2004, 2005, 2006, 2007)
- Torii Hunter [2] (2009, 2010)
- Reggie Jackson [2] (1982, 1984)
- Alex Johnson (1970)
- Fred Lynn [3] (1981, 1982, 1983)
- Albie Pearson (1963)
- Frank Robinson (1974)
- Lee Thomas [2] (1962^{1}, 1962^{2})
- Mike Trout [12] (2012, 2013, 2014, 2015, 2016, 2017, 2018, 2019, 2021, 2022, 2023, 2026)
- Mark Trumbo (2012)
- Leon Wagner [3] (1962^{1}, 1962^{2}, 1963)
- Devon White (1989)

Designated hitter

- Chili Davis (1994)
- Reggie Jackson (1983)
- Shohei Ohtani [3] (2021, 2022, 2023)

Manager

- Mike Scioscia (2003)
- Dick Williams (1974)

Italics indicates selected starters

== See also ==
- Baseball awards
- List of MLB awards
