= List of Los Angeles Angels team records =

The Los Angeles Angels are a Major League Baseball (MLB) team based in Anaheim, California. They have competed in the American League (AL) since 1961, and in the AL West division since it was formed in 1969. Having undergone a number of name changes, the team has previously been known as the California Angels, Anaheim Angels and Los Angeles Angels of Anaheim. The franchise's list of records includes those set in single games, single seasons and careers, by both the team and individual players.

== Career batting leaders ==
- Batting Average: Vladimir Guerrero (.319)
- On Base Percentage: Mike Trout (.412)
- Slugging Percentage: Mike Trout (.582)
- OPS: Mike Trout (.994)
- Games: Garret Anderson (2,013)
- At Bats: Garret Anderson (7,989)
- Runs: Mike Trout (1,106)
- Hits: Garret Anderson (2,368)
- Total Bases: Garret Anderson (3,743)
- Doubles: Garret Anderson (489)
- Triples: Jim Fregosi (70)
- Home Runs: Mike Trout (426)
- Runs Batted In: Garret Anderson (1,292)
- Walks: Mike Trout (971)
- Strikeouts: Mike Trout (1,458)
- Stolen Bases: Chone Figgins (280)
- Singles: Garret Anderson (1,572)
- Runs Created: Mike Trout (1,399)
- Adjusted OPS+: Mike Trout (173)
- Extra Base Hits: Garret Anderson (796)
- Times on Base: Garret Anderson (2,771)
- Offensive Win %: Mike Trout (.791)
- Hit by Pitch: Brian Downing (105)
- Sacrifice Hits: Bob Boone (90)
- Sacrifice Flies: Garret Anderson (76)
- Intentional Walks: Mike Trout (119)
- Grounded into Double Plays: Garret Anderson (180)
- Ground Outs: Vladimir Guerrero (980)
- At Bats per Strikeout: Albie Pearson (14.7)
- At Bats per Home Run: Shohei Ohtani (14.5)

== Single season batting leaders ==
- Batting Average: Darin Erstad, .355 (2000)
- On-base percentage: Mike Trout, .460 (2018)
- Slugging Percentage: Shohei Ohtani, .654 (2023)
- OPS: Mike Trout, 1.088 (2018)
- At Bats: Sandy Alomar Sr., 689 (1971)
- Runs: Mike Trout, 129 (2012)
- Hits: Darin Erstad, 240 (2000)
- Total Bases: Darin Erstad, 366 (2000), Vladimir Guerrero, 366 (2004)
- Doubles: Garret Anderson, 56 (2002)
- Triples: Chone Figgins, 17 (2004)
- Home Runs: Troy Glaus, 47 (2000)
- RBI: Don Baylor, 139 (1979)
- Walks: Mike Trout, 122 (2018)
- Strikeouts: Shohei Ohtani, 189 (2021)
- Stolen bases: Mickey Rivers, 70 (1975)
- Singles: Darin Erstad, 170 (2000)
- Runs Created: Mike Trout, 155 (2013)
- Extra-Base Hits: Garret Anderson, 88 (2002)
- Times on Base: Mike Trout, 309 (2013)
- Hit By Pitch: David Eckstein, 27 (2002)
- Sacrifice Hits: Tim Foli, 26 (1982)
- Sacrifice Flies: Dan Ford, 13 (1979)
- Intentional Walks: Vladimir Guerrero, 28 (2007)
- Grounded into Double Plays: Albert Pujols, 28 (2014)
- At Bats per Strikeout: Tim Foli, 21.8, (1982)
- At Bats per Home Run: Mike Trout, 10.4 (2019)
- Win Probability Added (WPA): Mike Trout, 7.0 (2014)

== Career pitching leaders ==
- ERA: Andy Messersmith (2.78)
- Wins: Chuck Finley (165)
- Won-Loss %: Jarrod Washburn (.568)
- WHIP: Troy Percival (1.101)
- Hits Allowed per 9 Innings Pitched: Troy Percival (6.03)
- Walks per 9 Innings Pitched: Bert Blyleven (1.74)
- Strikeouts per 9 Innings Pitched: Francisco Rodríguez (11.74)
- Games: Troy Percival (579)
- Saves: Troy Percival (316)
- Innings: Chuck Finley (2,675)
- Strikeouts: Nolan Ryan (2,416)
- Games Started: Chuck Finley (379)
- Complete Games: Nolan Ryan (156)
- Shutouts: Nolan Ryan (40)
- Home Runs Allowed: Chuck Finley (254)
- Walks Allowed: Nolan Ryan (1,302)
- Hits Allowed: Chuck Finley (2,544)
- SO to Walk: Frank Tanana (2.92)
- Losses: Chuck Finley (140)
- Earned Runs Allowed: Chuck Finley (1,107)
- Wild Pitches: Chuck Finley (117)
- Hit Batsmen: Chuck Finley (71)
- Batters Faced: Chuck Finley (11,398)
- Games Finished: Troy Percival (466)

== Single season pitching leaders ==
- ERA: Dean Chance, 1.65 (1964)
- Wins: Clyde Wright, 22 (1970), Nolan Ryan, 22 (1974)
- Losses: George Brunet, 19 (1967), Clyde Wright, 19 (1973), Frank Tanana, 19 (1974), Kirk McCaskill, 19 (1991)
- Won-Loss %: Jered Weaver, .846 (2006)
- WHIP: Frank Tanana, .988 (1976)
- Hits Allowed per 9 Innings Pitched: Nolan Ryan, 5.26 (1972)
- Walks per 9 Innings Pitched: Paul Byrd, 1.23 (2005)
- Strikeouts per 9 Innings Pitched: Nolan Ryan, 10.57 (1973)
- Games: Scot Shields, 78 (2005)
- Saves: Francisco Rodríguez, 62 (2008)
- Innings: Nolan Ryan, 332 2/3 (1974)
- Strikeouts: Nolan Ryan, 383 (1973)
- Games Started: Nolan Ryan, 41 (1974)
- Complete Games: Nolan Ryan, 26 (1973 and 1974)
- Shutouts: Dean Chance, 11 (1964)
- Strikeouts/Base on Balls: Jered Weaver, 4.900 (2010)
- Walks Allowed: Nolan Ryan, 204 (1977)
- Hits Allowed: Tommy John, 287 (1983)
- SO to Walk: Frank Tanana, 3.68 (1975)
- Earned Runs Allowed: Jim Abbott, 118 (1996)
- Wild Pitches: Nolan Ryan, 21 (1977)
- Hit Batsmen: Tom Murphy, 21 (1969)
- Batters Faced: Nolan Ryan, 1,392 (1974)
- Games Finished: Francisco Rodríguez, 69 (2008)

== Team single season records ==
- Most Games Won: 100 (2008)
- Most Games Lost: 99 (2024)
- Highest Winning Percentage: .617 (2008)
- Lowest Winning Percentage: .389 (2024)
- Longest Winning Streak: 11 games (June 16–June 26, 1964)
- Longest Losing Streak: 14 games (May 25, 2022 – June 8, 2022)
- Home Runs: 236 (2000)
- Runs Batted In: 837 (2000)
- Team Batting Average: .282 (1979, 2002, 2004)
- Team Slugging Percentage: .472 (2000)
- Hits: 1,603 (2002, 2004)
- Runs: 866 (1979)
- Doubles: 333 (2002)
- Triples: 54 (1966)
- Total Bases: 2,659 (2000)
- Extra Base Hits: 579 (2000)
- Grand Slams: 8 (1979, 1983)
- Walks: 681 (1961)
- Strikeouts: 1,080 (1968)
- Hit by Pitch: 77 (2001)
- Sacrifice Hits: 114 (1982)
- Sacrifice Flies: 64 (2002)
- Grounded Into Double Plays: 148 (1996)
- Stolen Bases: 220 (1975)
- Pitching Earned Run Average: 2.91 (1964)
- Pitching Strikeouts: 1,164 (2004)
- Pitching Walks: 713 (1961)

== Team game records ==
- Longest Game, Innings: 20 (at Oakland, July 9, 1971 and vs Seattle, April 13, 1982)
- Longest Game, Time: 6 hours, 37 minutes (at Oakland, April 29, 2013 - 19 innings)
- Longest Game, Time (9 innings): 4 hours, 12 minutes (at New York, August 25, 1998)
- Home Runs: 7 (June 4, 2003)
- Home Runs (Inning): 4 (May 28, 2000 and June 24, 2023)
- Hits: 28 (June 24, 2023)
- Runs: 25 (June 24, 2023)
- Runs (Inning): 13 (May 12, 1997 and June 24, 2023)
- Singles: 20 (August 23, 1967)
- Doubles: 10 (April 12, 1999)
- Triples: 3, several times (last Sept. 3, 2000)
- Total Bases: 52 (June 20, 1980)
- Total Bases (Inning): 24 (April 30, 1966)
- Extra Base Hits: 13 (August 25, 1979 and June 20, 1980)
- Strikeouts: 20 (September 25, 2012)
- Stolen Bases: 7 (August 25, 1981)
- Runs Allowed: 21 (Sept. 30, 2000)
- Runs Allowed (Inning): 13 (July 8, 1990 and July 5, 1996)
- Strikeouts by Pitcher: 26 (June 8, 2004 - 17 inn.)
- Strikeouts by Pitcher (9 Innings): 19 (August 12, 1974)
- Walks Given Up by Pitcher: 13 (August 6, 1994 - 10 inn. and July 12, 1992 - 10 inn.)
- Walks Given Up by Pitcher (9 Innings: 12, four times (last Sept. 30, 2000)
- Home Runs Given Up by Pitcher: 8 (June 27, 1996)
- Wild Pitches: 6 (April 13, 1991)
- Hit Batsmen: 4, several times (June 13, 1999)

== Individual game records ==
- Home Runs: 3, twelve times, last Torii Hunter (June 4, 2009)
- Runs Batted In: 10, Garret Anderson (August 21, 2007)
- Hits: 6, Garret Anderson (Sept. 27, 1996) 6, Chone Figgins (June 18, 2007)
- Runs: 5, Tim Salmon and Mickey Moniak (April 12, 1998 and June 24, 2023)
- Doubles: 3, several times, last Mickey Moniak (June 24, 2023)
- Triples: 2, several times, last Peter Bourjos (April 26, 2011)
- Total Bases: 15, Dave Winfield (April 13, 1991)
- Walks: 4, several times, last Tim Salmon (August 30, 2001)
- Strikeouts: 6, six times, last Matt Shoemaker (June 11, 2016)
- Stolen Bases: 4, Devon White (Sept. 9, 1989), Luis Polonia (June 10, 1992), Chad Curtis April 27, 1993)
- Strikeouts by Pitcher: 19, Nolan Ryan (June 14, 1974, August 12, 1974, August 20, 1974 and June 8, 1977)
- Hits Given Up by Pitcher: 15, Paul Hartzell (Sept. 9, 1976)
- Walks Given Up by Pitcher: 11, Rudy May (Sept. 17, 1973 - 12 2/3 inn.)
- Home Runs Given Up by Pitcher: 5, Willie Fraser (August 16, 1998)
- Most Hit Batsmen: 4, four times, last Scott Schoeneweis (June 7, 2001)

== Angels who have hit for the cycle ==
- Jim Fregosi July 28, 1964 vs. New York Yankees
- Jim Fregosi May 20, 1968 vs. Boston Red Sox
- Dan Ford August 10, 1975 vs. Seattle Mariners
- Dave Winfield June 24, 1991 at Kansas City Royals
- Jeff DaVanon August 25, 2004 vs. Kansas City Royals
- Chone Figgins September 16, 2006 at Texas Rangers
- Mike Trout May 21, 2013 vs. Seattle Mariners
- Shohei Ohtani June 13, 2019 at Tampa Bay Rays
- Jared Walsh June 11, 2022 vs. New York Mets
