= Vladimir Guerrero =

Dominican baseball player (born 1975)

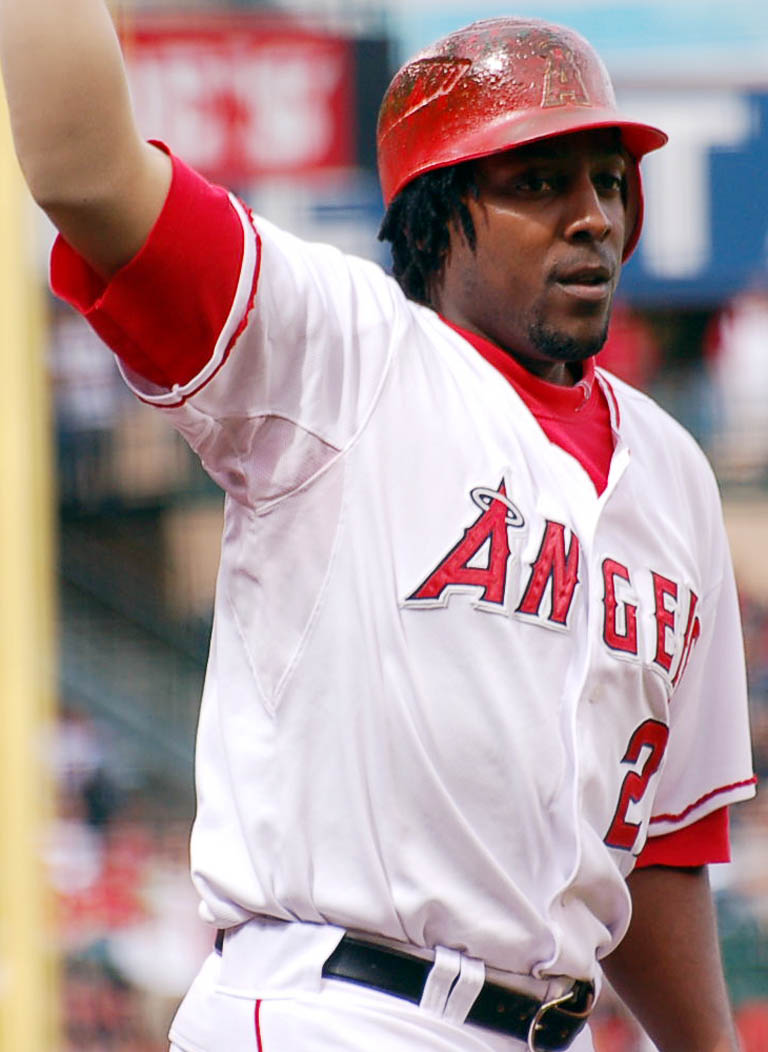
- Guerrero with the Los Angeles Angels in 2007
- Right fielder / Designated hitter
- Born: February 9, 1975 (age 51); Nizao, Dominican Republic
- Batted: Right Threw: Right

MLB debut
- September 19, 1996, for the Montreal Expos

Last MLB appearance
- September 28, 2011, for the Baltimore Orioles

MLB statistics
- Batting average: .318
- Hits: 2,590
- Home runs: 449
- Runs batted in: 1,496
- Stats at Baseball Reference

Teams
- Montreal Expos (1996–2003); Anaheim Angels / Los Angeles Angels of Anaheim (2004–2009); Texas Rangers (2010); Baltimore Orioles (2011)

Career highlights and awards
- 9× All-Star (1999–2002, 2004–2007, 2010); AL MVP (2004); 8× Silver Slugger Award (1999, 2000, 2002, 2004–2007, 2010); Angels Hall of Fame

Member of the National

Baseball Hall of Fame
- Induction: 2018
- Vote: 92.9% (second ballot)

Vladimir Guerrero Alvino (Note: While Guerrero's son became known as Vladimir Guerrero Jr., father and son have different maternal family names: Alvino and Ramos, respectively.) (born February 9, 1975), nicknamed "Vlad the Impaler", is a Dominican former professional baseball player who spent 16 seasons in Major League Baseball (MLB) as a right fielder and designated hitter. He played for the Montreal Expos (1996–2003), Anaheim Angels / Los Angeles Angels of Anaheim (2004–2009), Texas Rangers (2010), and Baltimore Orioles (2011).

A nine-time All-Star, Guerrero was widely recognized for his impressive offensive production—regularly hitting for power and average—as well as his defensive range and strong throwing arm. In 2004, he was voted the American League (AL) Most Valuable Player (MVP). Guerrero helped lead the Angels to five AL West championships between 2004 and 2009 and was voted one of the most feared hitters in baseball in a 2008 poll of all 30 major league managers.

Regarded as the game's premier "bad-ball hitter", Guerrero consistently hit balls thrown well outside the strike zone, a skill evident on August 14, 2009, when he hit a pitch after it bounced in front of home plate. With his aggressive batting style, he hit more than 30 home runs (HR) in each of 8 seasons and surpassed 100 runs batted in (RBI) 10 times, though he had just 2 seasons with at least 65 walks. In the first pitch of an at-bat, Guerrero hit 126 home runs and put 1,780 balls in play.

On September 26, 2011, Guerrero surpassed Julio Franco as the all-time MLB leader for hits by a Dominican player, a record since broken by Adrián Beltré in 2014. In 2018, Guerrero was inducted into the National Baseball Hall of Fame. In 2021, Guerrero and his son Vladimir Jr. became the second father-son duo in MLB history to each have a 40-home run season in their careers, joining Cecil and Prince Fielder. His .318 career batting average is the highest of any player who primarily played in the 21st century.

== Early life and amateur career ==
Guerrero was raised in Don Gregorio, Dominican Republic, in a house made of mud and brick and a palm-leaf roof. Guerrero's mother, Altagracia, made money selling food on the street until Hurricane David ravaged the country in 1979. After the hurricane, his mother traveled between the Dominican Republic and Venezuela in order to find work, while Guerrero and his siblings were in the care of a great aunt.

One of nine children, Guerrero is the younger brother of former MLB player Wilton Guerrero of the Montreal Expos, where the two were teammates for several seasons. Guerrero and his brothers played baseball using makeshift gloves assembled from milk cartons and socks filled with plastic bags as baseballs. Guerrero did not own a real baseball glove until he was 15 years old, when he received one from his older brother, a minor leaguer. Guerrero's brothers, Eleazar and Julio Cesar, played in the farm systems of the Boston Red Sox and Los Angeles Dodgers, respectively. Guerrero is also the cousin of minor leaguers Armando Guerrero and Cristian Guerrero, and the uncle of major leaguer Gabriel Guerrero.

As a teenager, Guerrero worked out for the Dodgers at their baseball complex in the Dominican Republic but he was ultimately sent home after eight months without a contract. In 1993, scout Arturo DeFreites convinced the Montreal Expos to sign Guerrero for $2,100 (equivalent to $4,700 in 2025). During the process, he lied about his age, claiming to be born February 9, 1976. It was not until March 2009 that he inadvertently revealed that he was born in 1975.

== Professional career ==
=== Montreal Expos ===
Guerrero was signed by the Montreal Expos as an unsigned amateur free agent, on March 1, 1993. He advanced quickly through the Expos' Minor League Baseball (MiLB) farm system, making his MLB debut on September 19, 1996. That night, Guerrero went 1-for-5 at the plate; his first big league hit, a single to center field, came against Atlanta Braves' starting pitcher Steve Avery, in the top of the fourth inning, at Atlanta–Fulton County Stadium. Two nights later, on September 21, Braves' closer Mark Wohlers yielded Guerrero's first career home run (HR) — a ninth-inning blast that capped Montreal's scoring, in a 5–4 loss. That contest is also significant, in that it marks Guerrero's first multi-hit game.

Guerrero was criticized during his first full season in 1997 (he had played only nine games in 1996) for being too aggressive at the plate. Nonetheless, he put up solid numbers for a rookie, batting .302, with 11 home runs and 40 runs batted in (RBI), in just 325 at bats (AB).

Guerrero led all major league outfielders in errors, in 1997 (12; tied), 1998 (17), 1999 (19), 2000 (10; tied), and 2001 (12; tied). He also led all NL outfielders in errors in 2002 (10), and led all AL outfielders in 2006 (11), and 2007 (nine).

Scorn for Guerrero's free-swinging ways changed into admiration in 1998. While he continued to swing at pitches that were clearly balls, he also continued to hit them with authority. In one instance, Guerrero got a base hit off a pitch that bounced before arriving at home plate. His superior hand-eye coordination and prodigious strength allowed him to be unusually aggressive at the plate, but still put up high batting averages year after year. Despite Guerrero's freeswinging style, he never struck out 100 times in a season (his highest strikeout count in a season was 95 in 1998).

In 1998, Guerrero batted .324, with 38 home runs, and 109 RBI. Before the end of that season, he agreed to a $28 million deal. Guerrero represented the Expos at the 1999 All-Star Game. During the 1999 season, he maintained a 31-game hitting streak‚ the longest in the majors in 12 years. Guerrero finished the season with 131 RBI, and in 2000, he hit 44 home runs; both figures are career highs.

On July 7, 2001, Guerrero threw out Alberto Castillo in one of the best throws in MLB history. After a base hit by Toronto, Castillo (on second base) saw an opportunity to score a run, as the batter had hit the ball well into deep right field. Guerrero caught the ball off a bounce and threw it to his catcher, who caught it squarely. Castillo was tagged out short of home plate. The throw's distance has been estimated to have been roughly three hundred feet, with its vertical arch peaking at merely 21 feet.

Guerrero posted similar or slightly improved numbers through the 2002 season. He had also developed a running game, stealing 37 bases the year prior. Additionally, Guerrero hit 34 home runs, joining the 30–30 club for the first time in his career and leading the major leagues in power–speed number (35.4). That season, Guerrero led the National League with 206 base hits and 364 total bases. He also stole a career-high 40 bases and fell one home run short of becoming the fourth member of the 40–40 club. He became the first player in major league history to hit 30 home runs, steal 40 bases, and hit above .330 in one season. Despite this, Guerrero led the majors in times caught stealing (20).

Guerrero's 2003 season was shortened due to a back injury. In 394 at-bats, he hit .330, with 25 home runs and 79 RBIs. Because of the injury, some in the media thought signing him would be a risk. While Guerrero played injured, he still managed to hit for the cycle on September 14, 2003. He would be the final Expo to hit for the cycle before their relocation to Washington after the 2004 season.

Throughout his career, Guerrero set single season Expos' records in batting average, slugging, on-base plus slugging (OPS), home runs, RBI, total bases (TB), hits, extra base hits (XBH), TOB, IBB, as well as several others. He is the all time Expos' career leader in batting (.323), homers (234), slugging (.588), and OPS (.978). Guerrero won the Montreal Expos Player of the Year award in 1998, 1999, 2000, and 2002.

=== Anaheim Angels / Los Angeles Angels of Anaheim ===
Guerrero was a free agent for the first time after the 2003 season, and signed a five-year, $70 million deal that included a mutual $15 million option for a sixth year with the Anaheim Angels on January 14, 2004, after being courted by several teams. The owner of the Angels, Arte Moreno, was the first Hispanic and Latino American controlling owner of a Major League ball club, and Guerrero cited Moreno's heritage as a motivating factor for choosing the Angels over other teams.

During his first season with the Angels, Guerrero led his club (and in some cases the American League (AL)) in several offensive categories, including 124 runs (set new club record and led the AL), 13 outfield assists (tied for first in AL), 366 total bases (tied club record and led AL), and a season-ending batting average of .337 (third in AL). He was the second player in club history with .300/30/100 statistics. Among AL leaders, he finished in the top 10 of 20 major offensive categories, which led to Guerrero being nominated for the Gene Autry Trophy (team's MVP) by his teammates. Making his fifth MLB All-Star game appearance in July, he led AL outfielders with 3,024,870 votes and was the first Angel outfielder to be a starter since Reggie Jackson in 1984.

Guerrero continued his offensive dominance in September, earning American League Player of the Month after batting .371 with 24 runs scored, six doubles, a triple, 10 home runs and 23 RBIs. Over the final seven games of the season, his 10 runs, six home runs and 11 RBIs helped the Angels overcome a 3-game deficit, which ultimately led to an American League West Division Crown.

In the 2004 MLB season, Mike Scioscia, the Angels' manager, said that Guerrero "really carried us on his back" in the last month of the season, as the team overtook first place from the faltering Oakland Athletics, who finished the season one game behind in the standings. Guerrero led the Angels to their first Western Division title since 1986. His late-season efforts led to Guerrero being chosen as the second Angel to win the AL MVP in franchise history. He finished with 354 points, 100 more than second-place finisher Gary Sheffield.

In the opening best-of-5 round of the playoffs, the Angels were swept by the Boston Red Sox, and Guerrero had an odd batting line: a .167 with six RBIs in three games. He also had a grand slam in Game 3.

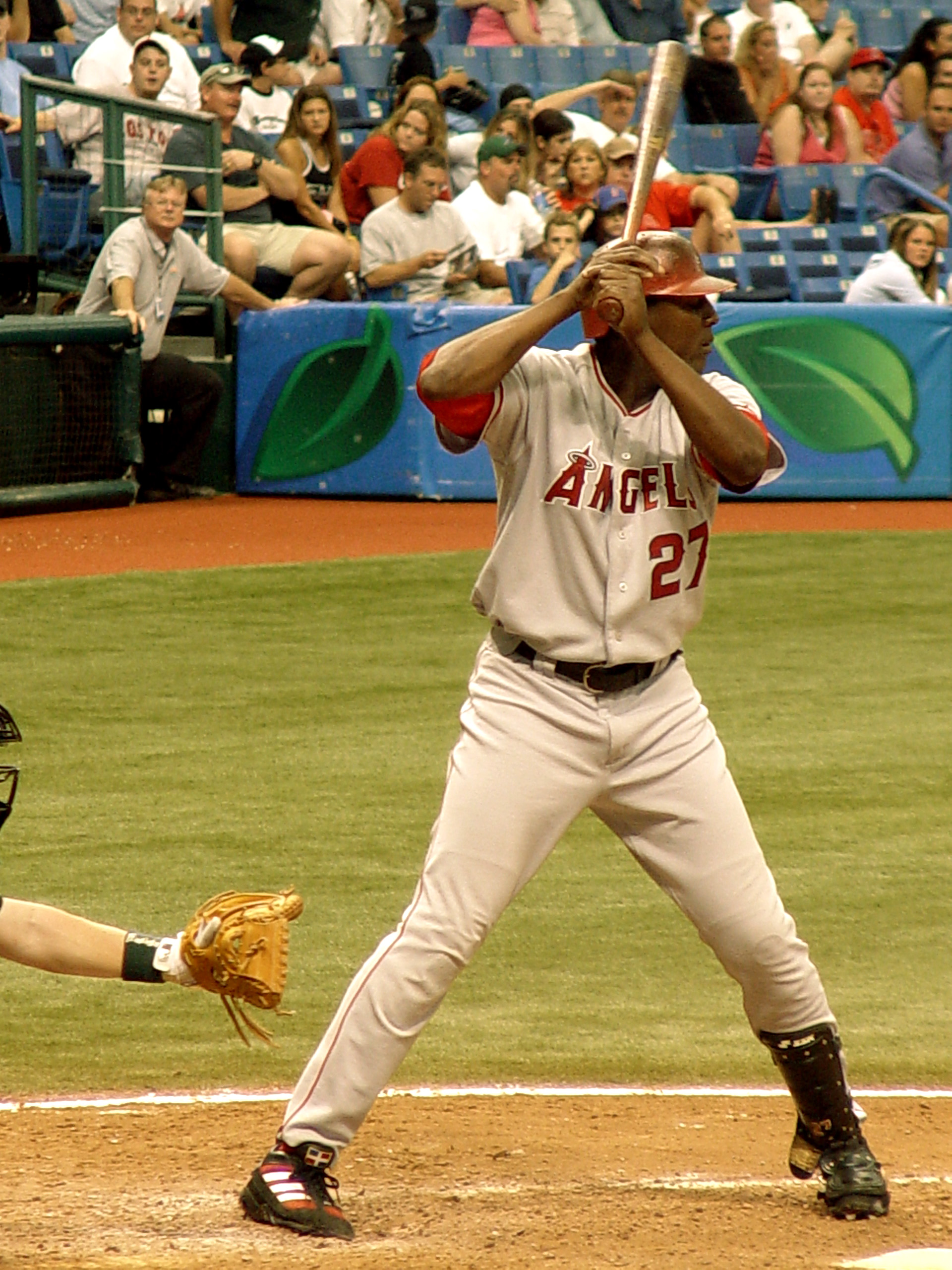
Guerrero at bat vs. the Tampa Bay Devil Rays, August 28, 2005.

The Angels won the Western Division again in 2005, with Guerrero batting .317 with 32 home runs and 108 RBIs in 520 at bats. Late in the season, Guerrero became the 12th player to hit his 300th home run before the age of 30 (along with Hank Aaron, Jimmie Foxx, Mickey Mantle, Eddie Mathews, Harmon Killebrew, Mel Ott, Frank Robinson, Alex Rodriguez, Ken Griffey Jr., Juan González, and Andruw Jones).

Guerrero had an up-and-down 2005 postseason, batting .389 in the ALDS victory over the New York Yankees, but just .050 in the ALCS in the Angels' loss to the Chicago White Sox. Guerrero also appeared in Game 4 of the 2005 World Series, where he was introduced as a member of Major League Baseball's Latino Legends Team.

Guerrero recorded his 1,000th career RBI on July 15, 2006, at home against the Tampa Bay Devil Rays.

Making his eighth MLB All-Star Game appearance, Guerrero subsequently won his first career Home Run Derby in the 2007 season, highlighted by a 503-foot (153 m) home run. He is the third Angel to win the Derby (after Wally Joyner in 1986, and Garret Anderson in 2003). Guerrero was chosen for the All-Star Game in each of his first four seasons with the Angels (2004–2007).

In 2009, Guerrero and the Angels exercised their mutual option and he remained with the team for a sixth year. Guerrero's stellar fielding talent dwindled in the late 2000s due to age and injuries, prompting the long-time outfielder to be reassigned as a designated hitter at the start of the season. That year, he was named number 37 on the Sporting News' list of the 50 greatest current players in baseball. A panel of 100 baseball people, many of them members of the Baseball Hall of Fame and winners of major baseball awards, was polled to arrive at the list. On August 10, Guerrero hit his 400th career home run off Tampa Bay Rays' pitcher Russ Springer. On August 26, he recorded his 1,000th career hit as an Angel, a single off Detroit Tigers' pitcher Edwin Jackson. This hit made Guerrero the fourth player (following Frank Robinson, Dave Winfield, and Fred McGriff) to record 1,000 hits as both a National League player and an American League player. On October 11, in the ninth inning against the Boston Red Sox, Guerrero delivered a two-run single off Jonathan Papelbon, scoring Bobby Abreu and Chone Figgins, which gave the Angels a 7–6 lead. Their eventual win advanced the team to the ALCS, where they beat the Red Sox for the first time in the postseason. For the first time in his career, Guerrero finished the season with a batting average below .300 (.295), an OPS below .800 (.794), and a doubles total less than 20 (16).

=== Texas Rangers ===
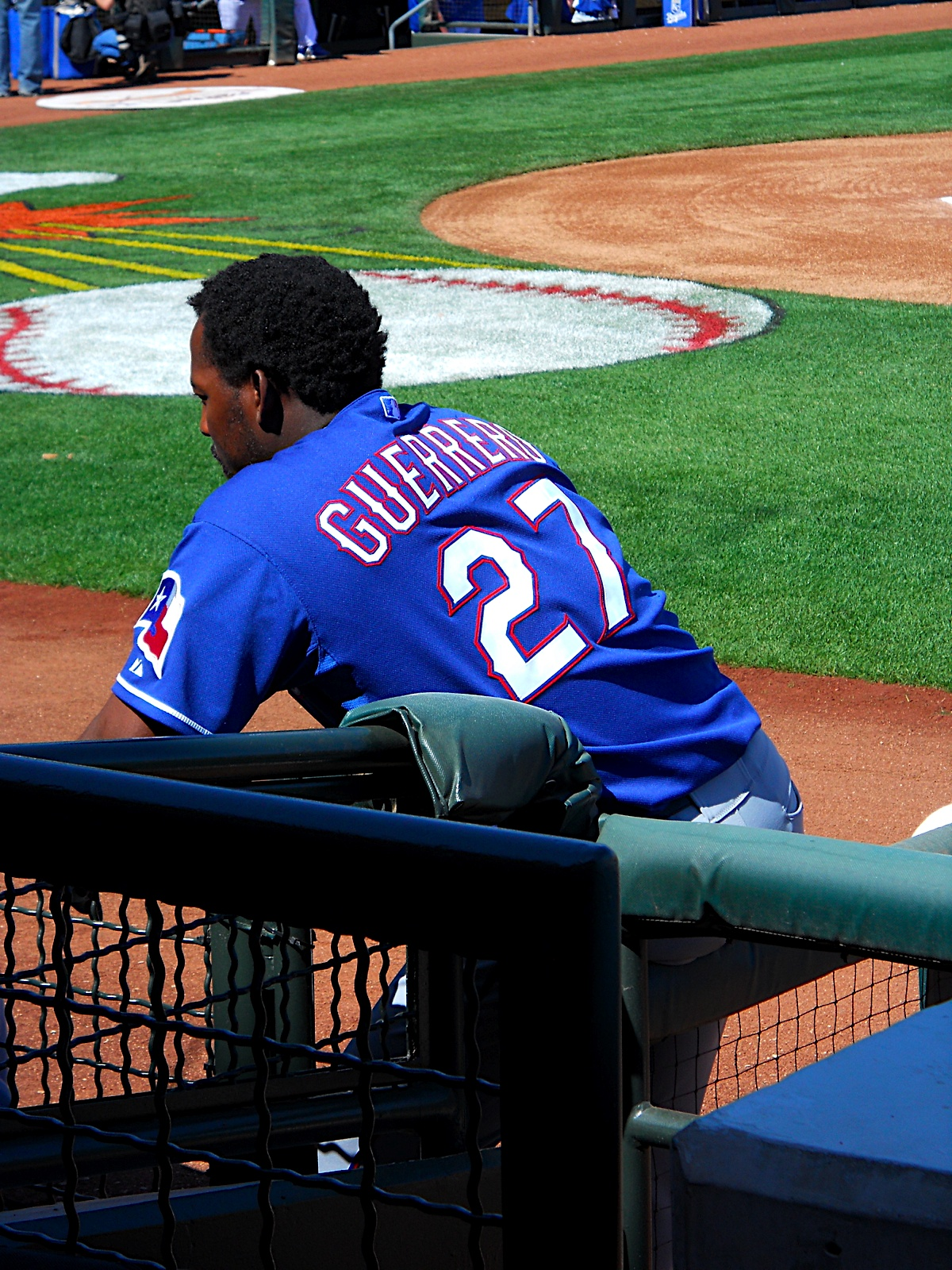
Guerrero in 2010 spring training.

On January 11, 2010, Guerrero signed a one-year, $5.5 million deal with incentives and a 2011 option with the Texas Rangers.

He broke up a no-hitter by Shaun Marcum in the seventh inning of the Opening Day game against the Toronto Blue Jays on April 5, 2010. On May 6, Guerrero hit two home runs against the Kansas City Royals to secure a 13–12 win. On May 13, Guerrero's walk-off line drive to left field won the final game of a three-game series against the Oakland Athletics in the bottom of the 12th. On May 25, he hit two more home runs to secure another win over the Royals. On June 30, against his former Angels, Guerrero hit two home runs and went 4-for-4 with 5 RBIs.

Guerrero wound up appearing in 152 games with a batting average of .300, 29 home runs and 115 RBIs. He earned a Silver Slugger Award in the regular season for a Texas Rangers' club that wound up winning its division and the first pennant in the team's history. Guerrero also won the Edgar Martínez Award and earned his ninth invitation to the All-Star Game. On October 22, Guerrero drove in 3 runs during Game 6 of the ALCS against the New York Yankees, capturing the first American League pennant for the Rangers. In the 2010 World Series against the San Francisco Giants, Guerrero was the starting right fielder for Game 1 in San Francisco. He didn't play in Game 2, but when the series went back to Texas, he played as the designated hitter. Guerrero batted .071 with just one hit while driving in two runs as the Rangers lost the series in five games. On November 3, the Rangers declined to pick up Guerrero's 2011 option, making him a free agent.

=== Baltimore Orioles ===
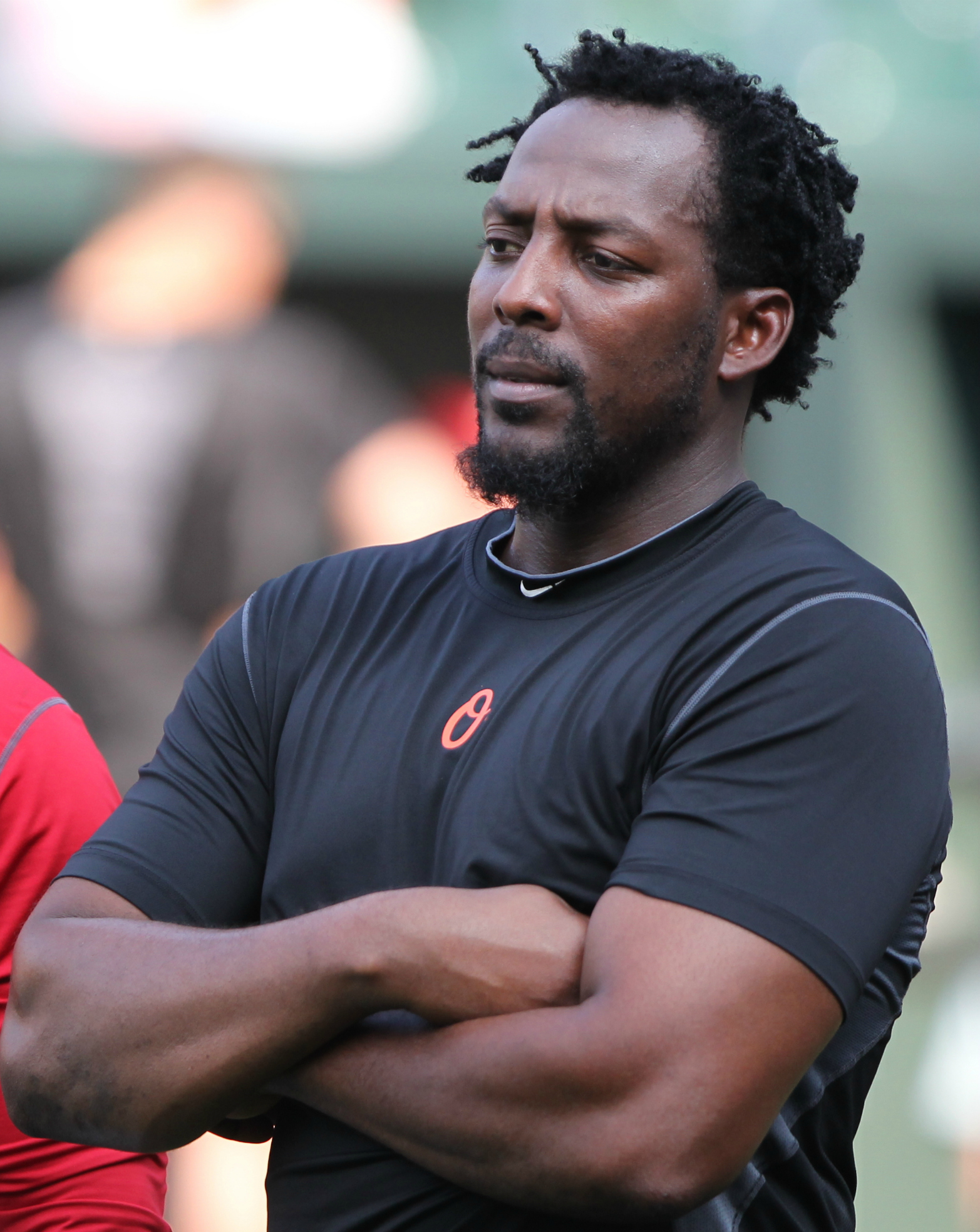
Guerrero in 2011

Guerrero signed a one-year, $8 million contract with the Baltimore Orioles on February 18, 2011. On September 26, he became the all-time MLB hits leader among Dominican-born players when he singled off Josh Beckett in the sixth inning of a 6–3 victory over the Boston Red Sox at Camden Yards. That season, Guerrero hit .290, his lowest batting average since his rookie year with the Montreal Expos in 1996. He also had 13 home runs, 63 RBIs, and 163 base hits for the Orioles.

=== Toronto Blue Jays ===
Guerrero remained unsigned by any team going into the 2012 MLB season. Despite speculation about his potential retirement, Guerrero insisted that he would not retire. On May 10, 2012, Guerrero signed a minor league contract with the Toronto Blue Jays. During his first game for the Advanced-A Dunedin Blue Jays on May 27, Guerrero hit a home run. Guerrero played in 4 games for Dunedin, with 9 hits in 20 at bats, including 4 home runs. He was then promoted to the Triple-A Las Vegas 51s. With the 51s, he played in 8 games, with 10 hits in 33 at-bats (.303 avg). He asked for, and was granted, his release on June 12.

=== Dominican Professional Baseball League ===
After leaving Toronto, Guerrero started playing in the Dominican Professional Baseball League with the Estrellas Orientales. On November 4, 2012, he returned to the league to play with the Tigres del Licey. He played only eight games with Licey, logging a batting average of .188 without a home run. On November 20, Guerrero quit the team after he was informed by team management that he would be used only as a pinch hitter.

=== Long Island Ducks ===
On April 4, 2013, Guerrero signed with the Long Island Ducks of the Atlantic League. He informed the team that he had family issues to attend to and would not be joining them to start the season. He never appeared with the team.

=== Retirement and Hall of Fame induction ===
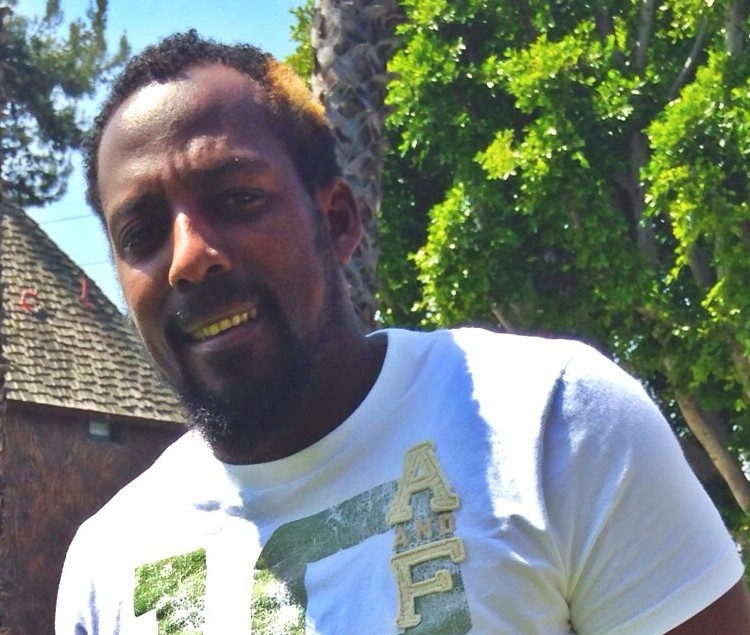
Vladimir Guerrero in 2014

On March 31, 2014, Guerrero signed a one-day contract with the Los Angeles Angels of Anaheim and officially retired from professional baseball. Having played his last game in 2011, he became eligible for induction to the Baseball Hall of Fame in 2017 and was inducted in 2018 along with Chipper Jones, Jim Thome, and Trevor Hoffman, earning 92.9% of the vote. Guerrero is the first member of the Hall to be depicted with an Angels cap, even though he appeared in more games (1004 versus 846) and played in more seasons (8 versus 6) as a Montreal Expo.

=== Career statistics ===
In 2,147 games over 16 seasons, Guerrero posted a .318 batting average (2,590-for-8,155) with 1,328 runs, 477 doubles, 46 triples, 449 home runs, 1,496 RBIs, 181 stolen bases, 737 walks, .379 on-base percentage, and .553 slugging percentage. Defensively, he finished his career with a .963 fielding percentage. In 44 postseason games, he hit .263 (45-for-171) with 17 runs, seven doubles, two home runs, 20 RBIs, two stolen bases, and 14 walks.

== International career ==
Guerrero was named to the Dominican Republic's roster for the 2006 World Baseball Classic, although he eventually withdrew due to the death of three cousins in a car accident immediately before the tournament. He also represented Canada in a few games.

== Player profile ==
Guerrero batted without wearing batting gloves, a custom rarely seen in modern baseball. In an interview with Yahoo! Sports, he attributed this to helping his grandfather pull cows home barehanded as a young boy in the Dominican Republic. To improve his grip on the bat, Guerrero coated his batting helmet with pine tar and rubbed it before going to the on-deck circle. As the season progressed, his helmet became increasingly covered in the substance.

Guerrero batted over .300 from 1997 to 2008. He drove in over 100 runs for seven seasons between 1998 and 2005 (2003 being the exception with 71). Along with his 2004 MVP season, he finished sixth (2000), fourth (2002), third (2005), ninth (2006), and third (2007) in MVP voting.

In 2008, Guerrero swung at a higher percentage of pitches outside the strike zone (45.5%) than any other hitter in major league baseball up to that time. This resulted in significantly fewer balls taken by Guerrero compared to other batters of his caliber, although it did reduce the percentage of strikes Guerrero took.

Guerrero had a 44-game hitting streak exclusively against the Texas Rangers from 2004 to 2006, the longest such player-versus-team streak in MLB history since 1969. The streak occurred over his first 44 appearances against the Rangers. It finally came to an end in August 2006 in a game in which Guerrero was intentionally walked three times, walked four times overall, and finished 0-for-1. He decimated Ranger pitching over the course of his major league career, putting up a career batting line of .395/.461/.661/1.122, with 25 home runs, 34 doubles, and 70 RBIs, in 108 games played.

During the 2009 postseason, Cal Ripken Jr. commented during a TBS postgame report that Guerrero was "the best bad-ball hitter I've ever seen". In a game against the Baltimore Orioles, Guerrero hit a pitch that bounced in the dirt in front of home plate. Even more unusual, his bat struck the ground as well before hitting the ball.

== Personal life ==
Guerrero has eight children with five different women. His son, Vladimir Jr., was born in Montreal in 1999 during the elder Guerrero's time with the Expos. Vladimir Jr. signed with the Toronto Blue Jays on July 2, 2015, made his major league debut on April 26, 2019, and won the All-Star Game MVP on July 13, 2021. His second son, Pablo Guerrero, signed with the Texas Rangers as an international free agent in January 2023.. His youngest son, Vladimir Miguel Guerrero, signed with the New York Mets on January 15, 2024.

Guerrero has provided job opportunities in his hometown in the Dominican Republic through his business ventures: a concrete-block factory, a propane distribution company, a supermarket, a livestock and vegetable farm, and a women's clothing store.

== Awards and honors ==
- Inducted into the Baseball Hall of Fame (2018)
- Inducted into the Canadian Baseball Hall of Fame (2017)
- American League Most Valuable Player (2004)
- Edgar Martínez Outstanding Designated Hitter Award (2010)
- 9× MLB All-Star (1999, 2000, 2001, 2002, 2004, 2005, 2006, 2007, 2010)
- 8× Silver Slugger Award winner (1999, 2000, 2002, 2004, 2005, 2006, 2007, 2010)
- 2× Montreal Expos Minor League Player of the Year (1995, 1996)
- 4× Montreal Expos Player of the Year (1998, 1999, 2000, 2002)
- 4× Los Angeles Angels Player of the Year (2004, 2005, 2006, 2007)
- 2× Baseball America First-Team Major League All-Star OF (2000, 2004)
- 3× Baseball America Second-Team Major League All-Star OF (1998, 1999, 2005)
- South Atlantic League All-Star OF (1995)
- Eastern League MVP (1996)
- Double-A Player of the Year (1996)
- Baseball America 1st team Minor League All-Star OF (1996)
- Double-A All-Star OF (1996)
- Eastern League All-Star OF (1996)
- Eastern League Rookie of the Year (1996)

== Career statistical highlights ==
=== League top ten ===
- Top 10 in MVP voting (2000, 2002, 2004(won), 2005, 2006, 2007)
- Top 10 in AVG (1998, 2000, 2002, 2003, 2004, 2005, 2006, 2007)
- Top 10 in home runs (1998, 1999, 2000, 2002, 2004, 2005, 2007, 2010)
- Top 10 in RBI (1999, 2000, 2002, 2003, 2004, 2005, 2006, 2007, 2010)
- Top 10 in slugging percentage (1998, 1999, 2000, 2002, 2003, 2004, 2005, 2006, 2007, 2008)
- Top 10 in OBA (2002, 2003, 2004, 2005, 2007)
- Top 10 in OPS (1999, 2000, 2002, 2003, 2004, 2005, 2006, 2007, 2008)
- Top 10 in hits (1998, 1999, 2000, 2001, 2002, 2004, 2006)
- Top 10 in runs (2002, 2004)
- Top 10 in stolen bases (2001, 2002)

== See also ==
- List of Major League Baseball annual runs scored leaders
- List of Major League Baseball career batting average leaders
- List of Major League Baseball career doubles leaders
- List of Major League Baseball career extra base hits leaders
- List of Major League Baseball career home run leaders
- List of Major League Baseball career runs batted in leaders
- List of Major League Baseball career slugging percentage leaders
- List of Major League Baseball career stolen bases leaders
- List of Major League Baseball career total bases leaders
- List of Major League Baseball players from the Dominican Republic
- List of Major League Baseball players to hit for the cycle
- List of Washington Nationals team records
- Los Angeles Angels award winners and league leaders

== Notes ==
Awards and achievements
Preceded by Sammy Sosa; Mark McGwire; Greg Vaughn; Barry Bonds; Barry Bonds	National League Player of the Month; July 1998; August 1999; April 2000; April 2002; August 2003	Succeeded by Jeff Kent; Greg Vaughn; Todd Helton; Todd Helton; Jim Thome
Preceded by Travis Hafner	Hitting for the cycle September 14, 2003	Succeeded by Chad Moeller
Preceded by Ichiro Suzuki	American League Player of the Month; September 2004	Succeeded by Brian Roberts
