= Chuck Finley =

American baseball player (born 1962)

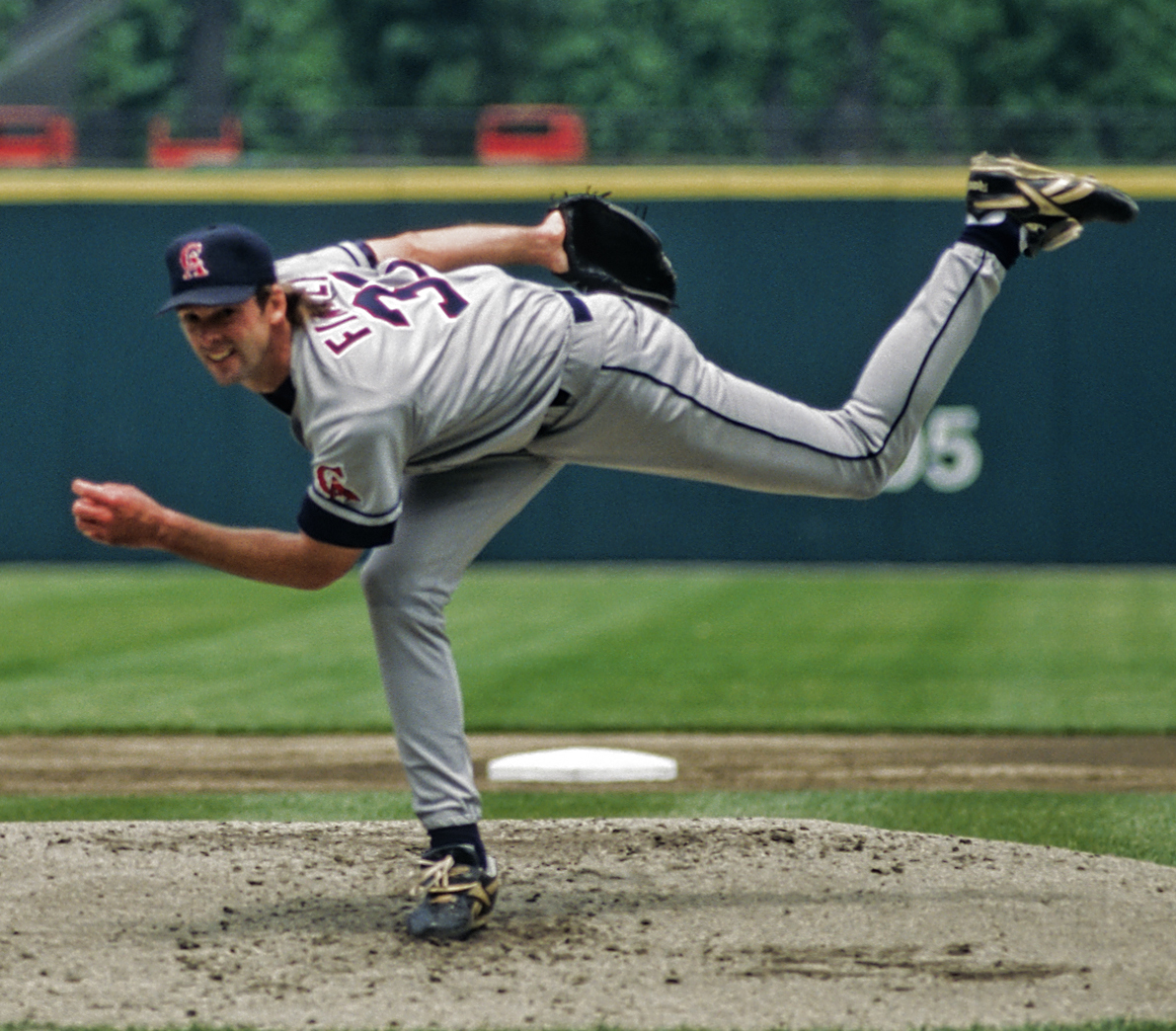
- Finley with the California Angels in 1996
- Pitcher
- Born: November 26, 1962 (age 63); Monroe, Louisiana, U.S.
- Batted: Left Threw: Left

MLB debut
- May 29, 1986, for the California Angels

Last MLB appearance
- September 28, 2002, for the St. Louis Cardinals

MLB statistics
- Win–loss record: 200–173
- Earned run average: 3.85
- Strikeouts: 2,610
- Stats at Baseball Reference

Teams
- California / Anaheim Angels (1986–1999); Cleveland Indians (2000–2002); St. Louis Cardinals (2002)

Career highlights and awards
- 5× All-Star (1989, 1990, 1995, 1996, 2000); Angels Hall of Fame

Charles Edward Finley (born November 26, 1962) is an American former professional baseball pitcher. He pitched from 1986 to 2002 for three teams in Major League Baseball (MLB), primarily with the California Angels. After a 14-year tenure with the Angels, he played for the Cleveland Indians for two-and-a-half seasons, then was traded to the St. Louis Cardinals and played there for a half-season. Listed at 6 feet 6 inches (1.98 m) and 220 pounds (100 kg), he threw and batted left-handed. During a 17-year major-league career, Finley compiled 200 wins, 2,610 strikeouts, and a 3.85 earned run average. He holds multiple Angels team records for a career, including games started (379), wins (165), losses (140), and innings pitched (2,675).

== Baseball career ==
Finley was born in Monroe, Louisiana, and pitched for West Monroe High School. After first playing college baseball for Louisiana Tech University, he transferred to Northeast Louisiana University. His ability to pitch for more than two or three innings was initially limited by mechanical issues, as his delivery at this time was "crude" and inconsistent. He was selected by the California Angels in the 15th round of the 1984 MLB draft, held in June, but he did not sign. The Angels chose Finley again with the fourth overall pick of the secondary phase of the draft, held in January 1985. After pitching for Northeast Louisiana during the spring, he signed with the Angels by late May.

Finley began his professional baseball career in 1985 with the minor league Salem Angels, a Class A Short Season team in the Northwest League. In 18 appearances, all in relief, he recorded a 4.66 earned run average (ERA) and a 3–1 win–loss record while earning five saves. In 1986, he made 10 relief appearances for the Quad Cities Angels of the Class A Midwest League, allowing only four hits and no earned runs in 12 innings pitched while striking out 16 batters and notching six saves. He was called up to the major-league Angels in late May.

=== California Angels / Anaheim Angels ===
Finley made his MLB debut with the Angels on May 29, 1986, during a 7–4 loss to the Detroit Tigers. In relief of starting pitcher Don Sutton, Finley allowed two runs on two hits in one inning pitched. He also recorded his first major-league strikeout, coming against Pat Sheridan. Finley made a total of 25 appearances, all in relief, with the 1986 Angels, pitching to a 3.30 ERA and a 3–1 record while striking out 37 batters in 46 1/3 innings. In his only postseason appearances with the Angels, Finley played in three games of the 1986 American League Championship Series against the Boston Red Sox, allowing one hit in two innings pitched.

Finley pitched to a 2–7 record with a 4.67 ERA in 1987, appearing in 35 games including three starts at the end of the season. The 32 relief appearances he made were the last of his major league career, as he was subsequently used exclusively as a starter. During 1988, Finley made 31 starts, accruing a 9–15 record with 4.17 ERA. His first MLB win as a starting pitcher came on April 13, a 5–2 win over the Chicago White Sox, and later that month he recorded his first complete game, a 6–1 win over the Toronto Blue Jays on April 30.

Finley was selected to the MLB All-Star Game in both 1989 and 1990. In the former season, he was 16–9 in 29 starts with a 2.57 ERA, while in the latter season he was 18–9 with a career-low 2.40 ERA in 32 starts. He received one vote in 1990 Cy Young Award balloting for the American League (AL), with the award going to Bob Welch of the Oakland Athletics. Finley again was 18–9 in 1991, albeit with a higher ERA of 3.80. His ERA further increased to 3.96 in 1992, and his record fell to 7–12.

Finley led the major leagues in complete games in 1993, with 13, en route to a 16–14 record with a 3.15 ERA in a career-high 251 1/3 innings pitched. In the strike-shortened 1994 season, he led the AL in starts (25) and innings pitched (183 1/3) while going 10–10 with a 4.32 ERA. Finley was selected to his third and fourth MLB All-Star Games in 1995 and 1996, winning 15 games each season, against 12 losses in 1995 with a 4.21 ERA, and 16 losses in 1996 with a 4.16 ERA. Finley became a free agent for the first time following the 1995 season, and was re-signed by the Angels.

In 1997, the team changed its name from California Angels to Anaheim Angels. During spring training, Finley was struck by a bat and sustained a broken orbital bone under his right eye. He made two rehabilitation starts, with the Class A-Advanced Lake Elsinore Storm of the California League. For the major-league season, he registered a 4.23 ERA and 13–6 record with the Angels. In 1998, he was 11–9 with a 3.39 ERA. During the 1999 season, Finley made 33 starts, compiling a 12–11 record with a 4.43 ERA. Finley also became the first pitcher in major league history to record four strikeouts in a single inning more than once, accomplishing the feat for the Angels on May 12 and August 15; he later accomplished it for a third time on April 16, 2000. He remains the only player to do it 3 times in his career.

After the 1999 season, Finley again became a free agent, and did not return to the Angels. In his 14 seasons with the team, he accrued an overall record of 165–140 with 3.72 ERA in 2,675 innings pitched; he won 15 or more games six times and pitched over 200 innings eight times.

=== Cleveland Indians ===
Finley signed with the Cleveland Indians in mid-December 1999. In 2000, he went 16–11 with a 4.17 ERA and was named an MLB All-Star for the fifth and final time of his career. In January 2001, Finley underwent arthroscopic knee surgery, and went on the disabled list twice during the season for neck and shoulder spasms. He made two rehabilitation appearances with the Akron Aeros of the Double-A Eastern League, and in 22 appearances with Cleveland posted an 8–7 record with a 5.54 ERA. In the 2001 American League Division Series, Finley started two games against the Seattle Mariners, losing both and pitching to a 7.27 ERA. In 2002, he was 4–11 in 18 starts for Cleveland with a 4.44 ERA before being traded.

=== St. Louis Cardinals ===
Finley was traded to the St. Louis Cardinals on July 19, 2002, for minor-league outfielder Luis Garcia and a player to be named later. Outfielder Coco Crisp was sent to Cleveland in early August to complete the deal, making his MLB debut later that month. Finley went 7–4 with a 3.80 ERA in 14 starts through the remainder of the season. In the 2002 postseason, Finley started one game of the 2002 National League Division Series, getting a no decision as the Cardinals swept the Arizona Diamondbacks. In the 2002 National League Championship Series, he won his only start, a 5–4 win over the San Francisco Giants in Game 3, as the Cardinals were eliminated in five games.

In November 2002, Finley filed for free agency. He remained unsigned into the 2003 season, and did not play again professionally. Overall, during his 17 seasons in MLB, Finley compiled a record of 200–173 with a 3.85 ERA and 1.376 WHIP. Defensively, he had a .907 fielding percentage, while offensively he had three hits in 53 at bats for an .057 batting average. He was only ejected from two MLB games, one each in 1990 and 1991.

Finely became eligible for the National Baseball Hall of Fame on the 2008 Baseball Hall of Fame ballot, but only received one vote and fell off the ballot.

== Personal life ==
As of 2021, Finley lives in Newport Beach, California.

=== Marriage ===
Finley was married to actress Tawny Kitaen from 1997 to 2002. They had two daughters. Finley and Kitaen were featured together in the 1999 Sports Illustrated Swimsuit Issue.

On April 4, 2002, Finley filed for divorce three days after Kitaen was charged with committing domestic violence against him, twisting his ear and having beaten him repeatedly with a stiletto heel in the arm, leg and foot while he was driving a car in Orange County, California, two weeks earlier. In the divorce filings, he stated, "I am fearful that (Kitaen)... will harm herself or will harm others, including me or including my children." He received a temporary restraining order preventing her from seeing him and he received temporary custody of the children.

During hearings on the domestic violence charge of spousal abuse, Kitaen initially pleaded not guilty but admitted that she was addicted to prescription medications which she had taken for two years for migraines, and voluntarily entered both substance abuse treatment and anger management classes for 52 weeks to get the charges dropped. Tawny Finley, in a declaration to the Orange County Superior Court, claimed Finley used steroids, among other drugs. She also claimed he bragged about being able to circumvent MLB's testing policy. When told of his wife's accusations, which also included heavy marijuana use and alcohol abuse, Finley replied: "I can't believe she left out the cross-dressing."

So prevalent was his personal life troubles that in April 16, 2002, road game against the Chicago White Sox, the Comiskey Park musical director took a subtle dig at Finley's messy divorce, and played "Here I Go Again" by the band Whitesnake, referencing Kitaen's appearance in that band's videos and her previous marriage to the band's lead singer, David Coverdale. Lasting only 1 2/3 innings, Finley gave up nine runs (eight earned) including two home runs. The musical director was later fired, and the White Sox apologized.

Finley's third daughter Briena was born in 2007 from a relationship at the time.

=== Library Scandal ===
In 2016, staff at the East Lake County Library in Sorrento, Florida, created a fictitious patron named “Chuck Finley” to manipulate the library’s circulation records. The name, borrowed from retired Major League Baseball pitcher Chuck Finley, was used to check out over 2,600 books within a nine-month period. The scheme was designed to prevent the library’s automated weeding system from discarding titles that had not been borrowed for an extended time. Library officials claimed this practice helped retain popular books that would otherwise have been removed and later repurchased.

Following an anonymous tip, an investigation by the Lake County Clerk of Courts’ inspector general’s office uncovered multiple fabricated accounts, leading to the suspension of staff involved and a system-wide audit of the county’s libraries. While the librarians did not personally benefit from the scheme, their actions as an attempt to “teach the system” how to better reflect reader interest rather than rely solely on circulation metrics. The former major league pitcher was not involved in the scandal.

== Honors ==
Finley became eligible for the National Baseball Hall of Fame as of 2008; he received one vote, and was dropped from future consideration for falling below the 5% threshold required to remain on the ballot.

Finley was inducted to the Louisiana Sports Hall of Fame in 2006. In November 2007, the Louisiana–Monroe Warhawks baseball program (known as Northeast Louisiana when Finley played there) retired Finley's no. 31 jersey; he was previously inducted to the university's hall of fame in 1996. Finley was inducted to the Angels Hall of Fame on August 27, 2009.

== In popular culture ==
In the show Burn Notice, the character Sam Axe, played by Bruce Campbell, frequently uses the alias Chuck Finley (or Charles Finley for more sophisticated circumstances), which is said to be chosen by Sam because he successfully bet on Chuck Finley many times. Reportedly, Campbell's father was once friends with a coworker also named Chuck Finley.

== See also ==
- List of Major League Baseball career wins leaders
- List of Major League Baseball single-inning strikeout leaders
- List of Major League Baseball career strikeout leaders
