= 2003 Major League Baseball All-Star Game =

2003 American baseball competition

	1	2	3	4	5	6	7	8	9	R	H	E
National League	0	0	0	0	5	0	1	0	0	6	11	1
American League	0	0	1	0	0	2	1	3	x	7	9	0
- Date: July 15, 2003
- Venue: U.S. Cellular Field
- City: Chicago, Illinois
- Managers: Dusty Baker (CHC); Mike Scioscia (ANA)
- MVP: Garret Anderson (ANA)
- Attendance: 47,609
- Television: Fox (United States); MLB International (International)
- TV announcers: Joe Buck and Tim McCarver (Fox); Gary Thorne and Ken Singleton (MLB International)
- Radio: ESPN
- Radio announcers: Dan Shulman and Dave Campbell

The 2003 Major League Baseball All-Star Game was the 74th midsummer classic between the all-stars of the American League (AL) and National League (NL), the two leagues constituting Major League Baseball, and celebrated the 70th anniversary of the inaugural All-Star Game played in Chicago, Illinois in 1933.

The game was held on July 15, 2003 at U.S. Cellular Field, the home of the Chicago White Sox of the American League. The game resulted in the American League defeating the National League 7–6, thus awarding an AL team (which was eventually the New York Yankees) home-field advantage in the 2003 World Series. This game was the first All-Star Game to award home-field advantage in the World Series to the winning league, a rule that stemmed from a controversial 7–7 tie in the previous year's edition. In the days leading up to the game, Fox advertised it with the tagline: "This time it counts." Subsequent editions altered the slogan to "This one counts" to reflect the new method of determining the World Series' home-field advantage; that arrangement ended with the 2016 edition, where the AL team (which became the Cleveland Indians, now the Cleveland Guardians) also won home-field advantage; the AL would win the next six years, as well as the last four. The winning league had a 9–5 record in the corresponding year's World Series, with the AL going 6–5 in the 11 years it won the All Star Game and the NL going 3–0 in the three years it won the All Star Game.

This All-Star Game marked the seventh All-Star appearance for the Naval Station Great Lakes color guard from North Chicago, Illinois, who this year was joined by police officers from the Kane County Sheriff's Department who presented the Canadian and American flags in the outfield. Both the five-man color guard and the sheriff's department officers accompanied jazz singer-songwriter Michael Bublé, who sang O Canada, and singer-songwriter Vanessa Carlton, who sang The Star-Spangled Banner accompanied by a celloist. Contemporary Christian music singer Amy Grant performed "God Bless America during the seventh inning stretch. Bublé's performance of "O Canada" was not televised until after the game in the Chicago area, while Carlton's performance was followed by fireworks that shot off the U.S. Cellular Field scoreboard. This was also the last All-Star game to have the stadium's public address announcer announce the all-star rosters and coaches; the game's play-by-play announcer (in this case, Joe Buck) proceeds that custom starting the next year's game and onwards.

== Rosters ==
Players in italics have since been inducted into the National Baseball Hall of Fame.

=== National League ===
Starters
Position	Player	Team	All-Star Games
P	Jason Schmidt	Giants	1
C	Javy López	Braves	3
1B	Todd Helton	Rockies	4
2B	José Vidro	Expos	3
3B	Scott Rolen	Cardinals	2
SS	Édgar Rentería	Cardinals	3
OF	Jim Edmonds	Cardinals	3
OF	Albert Pujols	Cardinals	2
OF	Gary Sheffield	Braves	7
DH	Barry Bonds	Giants	12

Pitchers
Position	Player	Team	All-Star Games
P	Armando Benítez	Mets	1
P	Kevin Brown^{[a]}	Dodgers	6
P	Shawn Chacón^{[a]}	Rockies	1
P	Éric Gagné	Dodgers	2
P	Russ Ortiz	Braves	1
P	Mark Prior	Cubs	1
P	John Smoltz	Braves	6
P	Billy Wagner	Astros	3
P	Mike Williams	Pirates	2
P	Woody Williams	Cardinals	1
P	Dontrelle Willis^{[c]}	Marlins	1
P	Randy Wolf	Phillies	1
P	Kerry Wood^{[c]}	Cubs	1

Reserves
Position	Player	Team	All-Star Games
C	Paul Lo Duca	Dodgers	1
1B	Richie Sexson	Brewers	2
2B	Luis Castillo^{[c]}	Marlins	2
2B	Marcus Giles^{[b]}	Braves	1
3B	Aaron Boone	Reds	1
3B	Mike Lowell	Marlins	2
SS	Rafael Furcal	Braves	1
OF	Luis Gonzalez	Diamondbacks	4
OF	Geoff Jenkins^{[FV]}	Brewers	1
OF	Andruw Jones	Braves	3
OF	Rondell White	Padres	1
OF	Preston Wilson	Rockies	1

=== American League ===
Starters
Position	Player	Team	All-Star Games
P	Esteban Loaiza	White Sox	1
C	Jorge Posada	Yankees	4
1B	Carlos Delgado	Blue Jays	2
2B	Alfonso Soriano	Yankees	2
3B	Troy Glaus	Angels	3
SS	Alex Rodriguez	Rangers	7
OF	Manny Ramirez^{[b]}	Red Sox	7
OF	Hideki Matsui	Yankees	1
OF	Ichiro Suzuki	Mariners	3
DH	Edgar Martínez	Mariners	7

Pitchers
Position	Player	Team	All-Star Games
P	Lance Carter	Devil Rays	1
P	Roger Clemens^{[c]}	Yankees	9
P	Brendan Donnelly	Angels	1
P	Keith Foulke	Athletics	1
P	Eddie Guardado	Twins	2
P	Roy Halladay	Blue Jays	2
P	Shigetoshi Hasegawa	Mariners	1
P	Mike MacDougal	Royals	1
P	Jamie Moyer	Mariners	1
P	Mark Mulder	Athletics	1
P	CC Sabathia	Indians	1
P	Barry Zito^{[a]}	Athletics	2

Reserves
Position	Player	Team	All-Star Games
C	Ramón Hernández	Athletics	1
C	Jason Varitek^{[FV]}	Red Sox	1
1B	Jason Giambi^{[c]}	Yankees	4
1B	Mike Sweeney^{[a]}	Royals	4
2B	Bret Boone	Mariners	3
3B	Hank Blalock	Rangers	1
SS	Nomar Garciaparra	Red Sox	5
OF	Melvin Mora	Orioles	1
OF	Magglio Ordóñez^{[c]}	White Sox	4
OF	Garret Anderson^{[c]}	Angels	2
OF	Vernon Wells	Blue Jays	1
DH	Carl Everett	White Sox	2
DH	Dmitri Young	Tigers	1

Notes

- ^{a} Player was unable to play due to injury.
- ^{b} Player was selected to start, but was unable to play due to injury.
- ^{c} Player replaced an injured player.
- ^{FV} Player was selected by the fans through the All-Star Final Vote.

== Game ==
=== Coaching staffs ===
National League
Coach	Position	Team
Dusty Baker	Manager	Chicago Cubs
Lloyd McClendon	Pittsburgh Pirates manager	
Tony La Russa	St. Louis Cardinals manager	
Dick Pole	Bench coach	Chicago Cubs
Larry Rothschild	Pitching coach	Chicago Cubs
Gary Matthews	Hitting coach	Chicago Cubs
Juan López	Bullpen coach	Chicago Cubs
Gene Clines	First base coach	Chicago Cubs
Wendell Kim	Third base coach	Chicago Cubs

American League
Coach	Position	Team
Mike Scioscia	Manager	Anaheim Angels
Jerry Manuel	Chicago White Sox manager	
Ron Gardenhire	Minnesota Twins manager	
Joe Maddon	Bench coach	Anaheim Angels
Bud Black	Pitching coach	Anaheim Angels
Mickey Hatcher	Hitting coach	Anaheim Angels
Orlando Mercado	Bullpen coach	Anaheim Angels
Alfredo Griffin	First base coach	Anaheim Angels
Ron Roenicke	Third base coach	Anaheim Angels

=== Umpires ===
Position	Umpire
Home Plate	Tim McClelland
First Base	Larry Young
Second Base	Gary Darling
Third Base	Gary Cederstrom
Left Field	Mark Carlson
Right Field	Bill Welke

=== Starting lineups ===
National League				American League			
Order	Player	Team	Position	Order	Player	Team	Position
1	Édgar Rentería	Cardinals	SS	1	Ichiro Suzuki	Mariners	RF
2	Jim Edmonds	Cardinals	CF	2	Alfonso Soriano	Yankees	2B
3	Albert Pujols	Cardinals	LF	3	Carlos Delgado	Blue Jays	1B
4	Barry Bonds	Giants	DH	4	Alex Rodriguez	Rangers	SS
5	Gary Sheffield	Braves	RF	5	Garret Anderson	Angels	LF
6	Todd Helton	Rockies	1B	6	Edgar Martínez	Mariners	DH
7	Scott Rolen	Cardinals	3B	7	Hideki Matsui	Yankees	CF
8	Javy López	Braves	C	8	Troy Glaus	Angels	3B
9	José Vidro	Expos	2B	9	Jorge Posada	Yankees	C
	Jason Schmidt	Giants	P		Esteban Loaiza	White Sox	P

=== Game summary ===
Tuesday, July 15, 2003 7:38 pm (CDT) at U.S. Cellular Field in Chicago, Illinois
Team	1	2	3	4	5	6	7	8	9	R	H	E
National League	0	0	0	0	5	0	1	0	0	6	11	1
American League	0	0	1	0	0	2	1	3	X	7	9	0
WP: Brendan Donnelly (1–0) LP: Éric Gagné (0–1) Sv: Keith Foulke (1); Home runs: NL: Todd Helton (1), Andruw Jones (1); AL: Garret Anderson (1), Jason Giambi (1), Hank Blalock (1)

Starters Esteban Loaiza and Jason Schmidt were sharp early on, each throwing a scoreless couple of innings to start the game. In the third, Roger Clemens relieved Loaiza and threw a scoreless inning himself. Randy Wolf could not do the same, allowing Carlos Delgado to single home Ichiro Suzuki with the game's first run, and a 1–0 lead for the AL.

The lead would stand until the fifth inning, when Todd Helton gave the NL the lead with a two-run homer off Shigetoshi Hasegawa. The National League would go on to score three more runs that inning, on the strength of a two-run double from Andruw Jones and an RBI single from Albert Pujols, giving the NL a 5–1 lead.

In the sixth, Garret Anderson hit a two-run homer off Woody Williams to bring the AL back within two. Andruw Jones would get one of those runs back the next inning by hitting a solo shot off Mark Mulder. Jason Giambi got the run right back with a solo shot off Billy Wagner in the seventh.

In the eighth came Éric Gagné, who did not blow any saves in the 2003 regular season. The All-Star Game would prove to be the one blemish on his record for the year. Staked to a 6–4 lead, Gagne gave up a one-out double to Garret Anderson, who was replaced by pinch-runner Melvin Mora. Vernon Wells singled Mora home to make it a one-run game. Then Hank Blalock hit a dramatic, two-out go-ahead home run to put the AL up 7–6.

Keith Foulke came in the ninth to try to earn the save. Foulke closed the door and set the side down 1-2-3. Garret Anderson, who batted 3–4 with a double, home run and two RBI, was awarded the game's MVP honors, a night after winning the 2003 Home Run Derby.

== Home Run Derby ==
U.S. Cellular Field, Chicago—A.L. 47, N.L. 39
Player	Team	Round 1	Semis	Finals	Totals
Garret Anderson	Angels	7	6	9	22
Albert Pujols	Cardinals	4	14	8	26
Jason Giambi	Yankees	12	11	–	23
Jim Edmonds	Cardinals	4	4	–	8
Gary Sheffield	Braves	4	–	–	4
Carlos Delgado	Blue Jays	2	–	–	2
Richie Sexson	Brewers	1	–	–	1
Bret Boone	Mariners	0	–	–	0

Semifinals
1	Jason Giambi	11
4	Albert Pujols	14
2	Garret Anderson	6
3	Jim Edmonds	4

Finals
4	Albert Pujols	8
2	Garret Anderson	9

== Notes ==
- For the first time since 1978 (Reds: Pete Rose, Joe Morgan, and George Foster) an all-star team had the first three hitters from the same regular season team (Cardinals: Renteria, Edmonds, and Pujols).
- From 1997-July 1998, Jason Schmidt and Esteban Loaiza were teammates in Pittsburgh.
- The honorary captains for the game were Hall of Famers Gary Carter (N.L.) and Luis Aparicio (A.L.).
- This was Eric Gagné's only blown save of 2003, as he went a perfect 55 for 55 in save opportunities in the regular season.
- This was the first All-Star Game in which one of the managers was not the manager of the team he had taken to the World Series the year before. NL manager Dusty Baker had led the San Francisco Giants to the NL pennant in 2002, but during the offseason had left the Giants to become manager of the Chicago Cubs. Baker, and not his San Francisco replacement, Felipe Alou, still managed the team.
