= Brendan Donnelly =

American baseball player (born 1971)

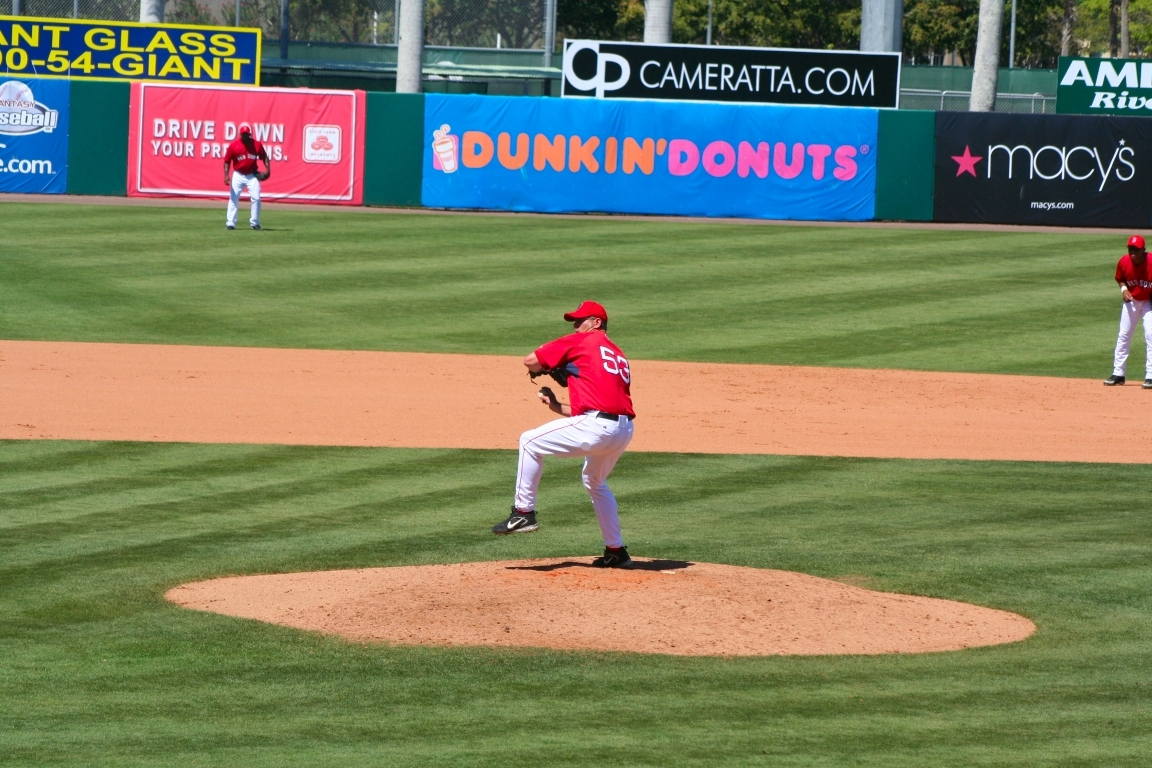
- Pitcher
- Born: July 4, 1971 (age 55); Washington, D.C., U.S.
- Batted: Right Threw: Right

MLB debut
- April 9, 2002, for the Anaheim Angels

Last MLB appearance
- July 23, 2010, for the Pittsburgh Pirates

MLB statistics
- Win–loss record: 32–10
- Earned run average: 3.22
- Strikeouts: 369
- Stats at Baseball Reference

Teams
- Anaheim / Los Angeles Angels of Anaheim (2002–2006); Boston Red Sox (2007); Cleveland Indians (2008); Florida Marlins (2009); Pittsburgh Pirates (2010)

Career highlights and awards
- All-Star (2003); World Series champion (2002)

Brendan Kevin Donnelly (born July 4, 1971) is an American former Major League Baseball relief pitcher. A right-hander, Donnelly pitched for twenty-one teams (two of them independents), twelve organizations, two independent leagues, eleven organized minor leagues, and both the American League and the National League.

Donnelly won the World Series in 2002 with the Anaheim Angels and was on the roster for the Boston Red Sox during their 2007 World Series victory. Donnelly was also the winning pitcher of the 2003 All-Star Game. After ten seasons in the minors and eight seasons in MLB, he retired in 2011.

== Career ==
=== Minor leagues ===
Donnelly was drafted by the Chicago White Sox in the 27th round (764th overall) of the 1992 Major League Baseball (MLB) draft. The White Sox released him in April 1993. In June 1993, he signed with the Chicago Cubs organization; the Cubs released him before the start of the 1994 season. In 1994, he played for the independent Ohio Valley Redcoats.

In March 1995, Donnelly signed with the Cincinnati Reds and participated in spring training as a replacement player during the 1994–95 MLB strike. Due to his participation as a replacement player, Donnelly was permanently barred from joining the Major League Baseball Players Association. Donnelly remained in the Reds organization until he was released on April 3, 1999.

Donnelly started the 1999 season with the independent Nashua Pride. On May 15, his contract was purchased by the Tampa Bay Devil Rays. He was released on August 12. On August 18, Donnelly was signed by the Pittsburgh Pirates. He was released on August 25. On August 26, he was signed by the Toronto Blue Jays. He was released on July 28, 2000. On August 10, he signed with the Chicago Cubs. He became a free agent after the 2000 season.

=== Anaheim Angels ===
On January 20, 2001, Donnelly signed with the Anaheim Angels. He spent the 2001 season with the Double-A Arkansas Travelers and Triple-A Salt Lake Stingers, where he posted a 9–2 record, 13 saves and a 2.43 earned run average (ERA) in 56 relief appearances. On April 9, 2002, Donnelly made his major league debut with the Angels at 30 years of age. In the game, he allowed three runs (two earned) in one inning of work as the Angels lost 5–1. He was later sent back to Salt Lake, and recalled again in June when Julio Ramírez was placed on the disabled list. After mostly subpar performances in the majors at that point, Donnelly cemented his role in the Angels' bullpen with an exceptional July in which he did not allow a single run, lowering his ERA from 6.14 to 2.33. Donnelly made 46 relief appearances in his first major league season, going 1–1 with one save and a 2.17 ERA.

Donnelly was an immediate fan favorite because of his intensity, his goggles, and his effectiveness as the main setup man to Troy Percival. Donnelly would play an integral part of the Angels' bullpen during their playoff run in 2002. After struggling in the ALDS and ALCS, Donnelly excelled in the World Series against the San Francisco Giants, allowing zero runs in five appearances (7 2/3 innings, four walks, six strikeouts). He was also the winning pitcher in Game 6, tossing a scoreless eighth inning in Anaheim's 6–5 win. In the decisive Game 7, Donnelly tossed two scoreless innings while striking out two batters, helping the Angels to their first World Series title.

Donnelly was the third replacement player to win the World Series, behind Shane Spencer of the 1998, 1999 and 2000 New York Yankees and Damian Miller of the 2001 Arizona Diamondbacks. His name does not appear on any official commemorative merchandise from the Angels 2002 World Series win, due to him being barred from the MLBPA.

In 2003, Donnelly continued his role as the Angels' setup man, posting a 2–2 record, three saves and a 1.58 ERA in 63 games. His performance led to him becoming a rare example of a non-closer who was selected as an All-Star. Donnelly went on to be the winning pitcher in that game.

Donnelly suffered a broken nose while shagging fly balls during spring training in 2004, causing him to undergo three surgeries and to miss the first two months of the season. Donnelly remained fairly effective throughout 2004, finishing 5–2 with a 3.00 ERA in 40 appearances. In 2005, Donnelly began to see a decline in performance, including a decrease in velocity on his fastball as a setup man for closer Francisco Rodríguez after Percival's departure. In June 2005, Donnelly was suspended ten days for having pine tar on his glove, an incident that caused a scrum and accusations that former teammate Jose Guillén tipped manager Frank Robinson. The suspension was the culmination of three weeks of extra scrutiny on Donnelly from opposing managers and umpires, including an accusation from then-Chicago White Sox manager Ozzie Guillén accusing Donnelly of touching his mouth too often. Donnelly would later advocate for the legalization of pine tars for pitchers. Donnelly finished the season 9–3 with a 3.72 ERA in 65 relief appearances.

In 2006, Donnelly settled into a middle relief role and went 6–0 with a 3.94 ERA in 62 relief appearances.

=== Boston Red Sox ===
On December 15, 2006, Donnelly was traded to the Boston Red Sox for Phil Seibel. He made 27 relief appearances with the Red Sox, going 2–1 with a 3.05 ERA. On June 17, Donnelly was placed on the disabled list with right forearm tightness.

On July 31, 2007, it was announced that Donnelly would need Tommy John surgery, ending his season. During his absence, the Red Sox would win the World Series. Donnelly became a free agent after the 2007 season.

=== Cleveland Indians ===
On February 6, 2008, the Cleveland Indians signed Donnelly to a minor league contract with an invitation to spring training. The Indians hoped Donnelly would provide bullpen help at the end of the season when he recovered from Tommy John surgery.

Donnelly was brought up to the Indians in August 2008 as a replacement for Tom Mastny. He struggled in Cleveland, going 1–0 with an ERA of 8.56 in 15 relief appearances.

=== 2009 ===
On February 7, 2009, Donnelly signed a minor league contract with the Texas Rangers. He was released on March 26. On April 28, he signed with the Houston Astros. Donnelly made 24 relief appearances with the Triple-A Round Rock Express, going 2–0 with six saves and a 1.75 ERA. He was released on July 1. On July 5, Donnelly signed a major league contract with the Florida Marlins and was immediately added to their bullpen. In 30 relief appearances with the Marlins, he went 3–0 with two saves and a 1.78 ERA. He became a free agent after the 2009 season.

=== Pittsburgh Pirates ===
On January 16, 2010, Donnelly agreed with the Pittsburgh Pirates on a one-year deal worth $1.5 million. He made 38 relief appearances with the Pirates, going 3–1 with a 5.58 ERA. Before he could reach incentives that would have approximately doubled his salary, the Pirates released Donnelly in July 2010, denying that the incentives were the reason for the release. He was the last of the replacement players still in the major leagues. His name, likeness, and uniform number were still replaced by fictional players in video games.

=== Retirement ===
Donnelly announced his retirement on March 9, 2011.

== Mitchell Report ==
Donnelly was named in the December 13, 2007 Mitchell Report regarding the use of performance-enhancing drugs in baseball. According to former clubhouse attendant and steroids distributor Kirk Radomski, Donnelly sought him out in 2004 looking to purchase oxandrolone, an anabolic steroid. Radomski says he made one sale of nandrolone to Donnelly, for which he received $250–$300. In response to the report, Donnelly admitted contacting Radomski in 2004 regarding oxandrolone, hoping it would help him recover from injuries faster. Donnelly denied ever buying or using the drug because he was made aware that it was considered a steroid.

== See also ==
- List of Major League Baseball replacement players
- List of Major League Baseball players named in the Mitchell Report
