= Garret Anderson =

American baseball player (1972–2026)

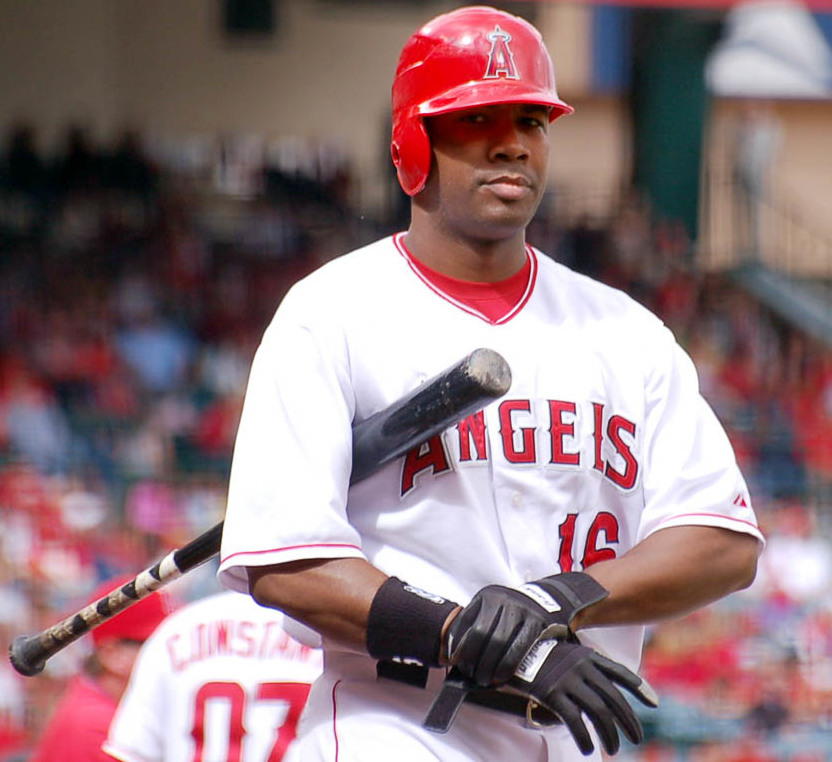
- Anderson with the Angels in 2007
- Left fielder
- Born: June 30, 1972; Los Angeles, California, U.S.
- Died: April 16, 2026 (aged 53); Newport Beach, California, U.S.
- Batted: Left Threw: Left

MLB debut
- July 27, 1994, for the California Angels

Last MLB appearance
- August 6, 2010, for the Los Angeles Dodgers

MLB statistics
- Batting average: .293
- Hits: 2,529
- Home runs: 287
- Runs batted in: 1,365
- Stats at Baseball Reference

Teams
- California / Anaheim Angels / Los Angeles Angels of Anaheim (1994–2008); Atlanta Braves (2009); Los Angeles Dodgers (2010)

Career highlights and awards
- 3× All-Star (2002, 2003, 2005); World Series champion (2002); 2× Silver Slugger Award (2002, 2003); Angels Hall of Fame

Garret Joseph Anderson (June 30, 1972 – April 16, 2026) was an American professional baseball left fielder who played 17 seasons in Major League Baseball (MLB) from 1994 to 2010, primarily for the California / Anaheim Angels / Los Angeles Angels of Anaheim. He also played for the Atlanta Braves and Los Angeles Dodgers.

A three-time All-Star, Anderson drove in the championship-winning runs in the 2002 World Series, and was named Most Valuable Player of the 2003 All-Star Game. He holds Angels franchise records for career games played (2,013), at bats (7,989), hits (2,368), runs scored (1,024), runs batted in (RBIs) (1,292), total bases (3,743), extra base hits (796), singles (1,572), doubles (489), grand slams (8), RBIs in a single game (10) and consecutive games with an RBI (12), as well as home runs by a left-handed hitter (272).

== Early life ==
Anderson attended Kennedy High School in Granada Hills, California. He was a three-sport star in baseball, football, and basketball. In baseball, he won two All-Los Angeles City honors and two All-League Honors, and as a junior, helped his team win the Los Angeles City Championship. In basketball, as a senior he won All-Los Angeles City honors and All-League honors. He accepted an athletic scholarship to attend California State University, Fresno and play college baseball for the Fresno State Bulldogs.

== Professional career ==
=== Anaheim Angels ===
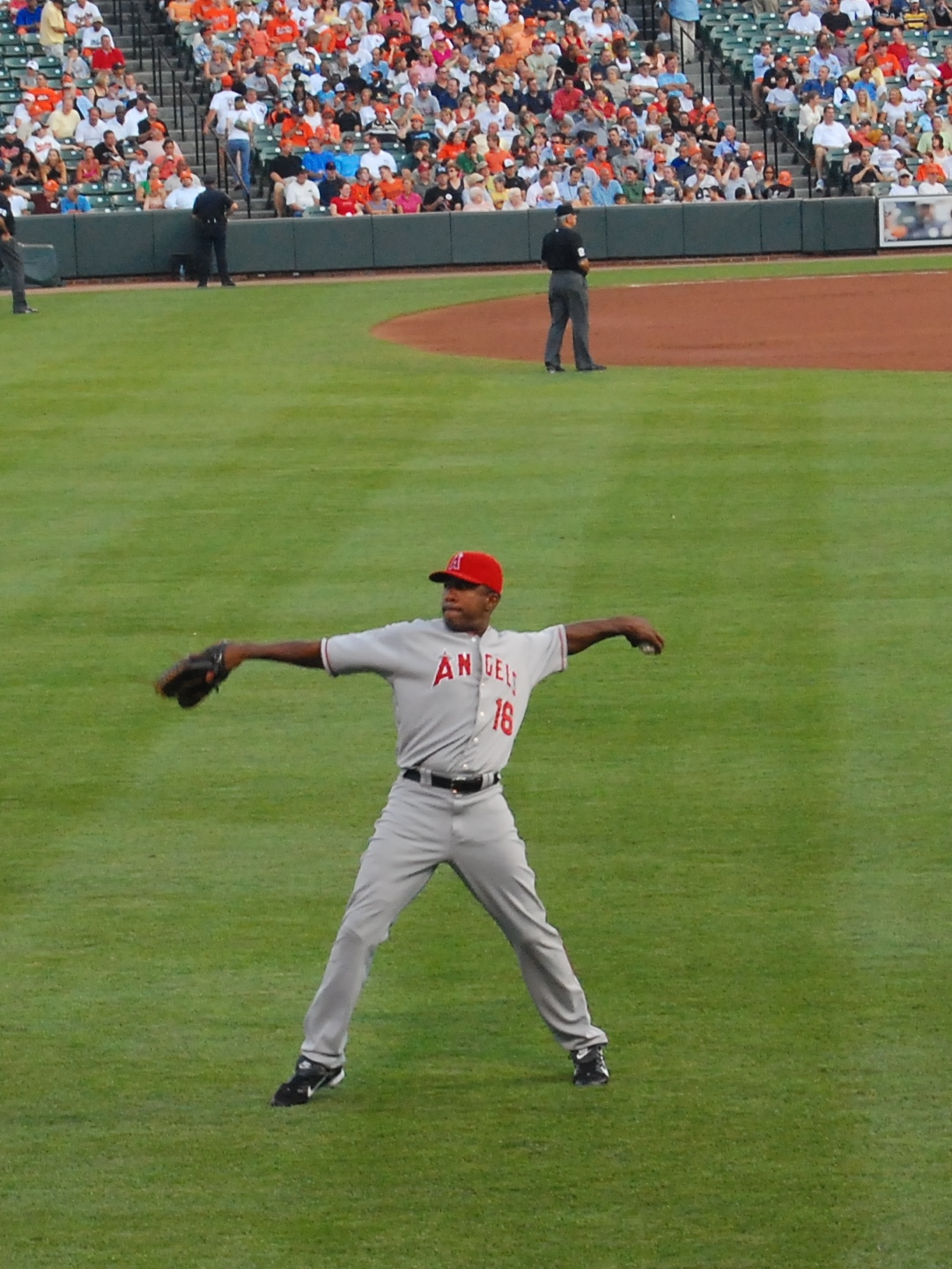
Anderson in 2008

The Angels selected Anderson in the fourth round of the 1990 MLB draft. He signed with the Angels rather than enroll at Fresno State. He began the 1992 season with the Class A Palm Springs Angels and batted .323 before being promoted to the AA Midland Angels. In 1993, he played for the AAA Vancouver Canadians and returned there to begin the 1994 season.

Anderson made his major league debut on July 27, 1994. He had two hits in four at bats in that game, recording his first career hit on a single to right field off Oakland Athletics pitcher Ron Darling in the bottom of the third inning. He appeared in five games with the Angels in 1994, getting five hits in 13 at bats.

In 1995, Anderson was called up to the major leagues on April 26 and spent the rest of the year in the majors. He hit his first career home run on June 13 against Kevin Tapani of the Minnesota Twins. He was named the American League Player of the Month for July 1995, after batting .410 with 22 runs scored and 31 runs batted in (RBIs) in 25 games played. He batted .321 in 106 games with 16 home runs and 69 RBIs, and finished second in the Rookie of the Year voting to Marty Cordova of the Twins. From that point forward, Anderson became a mainstay in the Angels lineup. Over the next eight seasons, he accumulated at least 600 at bats every year, breaking 90 RBIs and 20 home runs five times while compiling a batting average near .300. Anderson hit a career-high 35 home runs in 2000.

In 2002, when the Angels won their first World Series championship, Anderson finished fourth in the Most Valuable Player voting after compiling a .306 average with 29 home runs and 123 RBIs, including a three-run double in the third inning of Game 7 which would turn out to be the series-winning hit. Anderson also scored a career-high 93 runs; however, the fact that he never scored 100 in a season was a result of his main weakness as a player – an inability to draw walks and achieve a high on-base percentage. Anderson had a similarly strong performance in 2003, and was named an American League All-Star. That All-Star weekend, he became the Home Run Derby Champion and voted the Most Valuable Player in the All-Star Game, the first player to win both since Cal Ripken Jr. in 1991. In 2002 and 2003, Anderson tied for the American League lead in doubles with Nomar Garciaparra and Vernon Wells, respectively.

On April 13, 2004, Anderson agreed to a $48 million, four-year contract extension through 2008. The deal included a team option for 2009 with a $3 million buyout. Anderson began experiencing chronic ailments in 2004 that limited his playing time and production, including an arthritic condition and plantar fasciitis in his feet. In 2005, he began to see more regular time as a designated hitter to ease the wear and tear on his body. Anderson's production in 2006 was roughly on par with his 2005 production, with both seasons seeing him hit 17 home runs and drive in at least 85 runs. He recorded his 2,000th career hit on July 1, 2006.

On August 21, 2007, Anderson drove in a team-record 10 runs, including a grand slam and a three-run home run, in the Angels' 18–9 win over the New York Yankees. Anderson became the 13th player in major jeague history to have 10 RBIs in a game. On September 7, Anderson drove in a run on an RBI single, to set a franchise record for most consecutive games with an RBI with 11. The streak lasted for 12 games, during which time he drove in 22 runs.

On October 28, 2008, the Angels announced they would decline their $14 million option on Anderson's contract and exercised a $3 million buyout.

=== Atlanta Braves ===
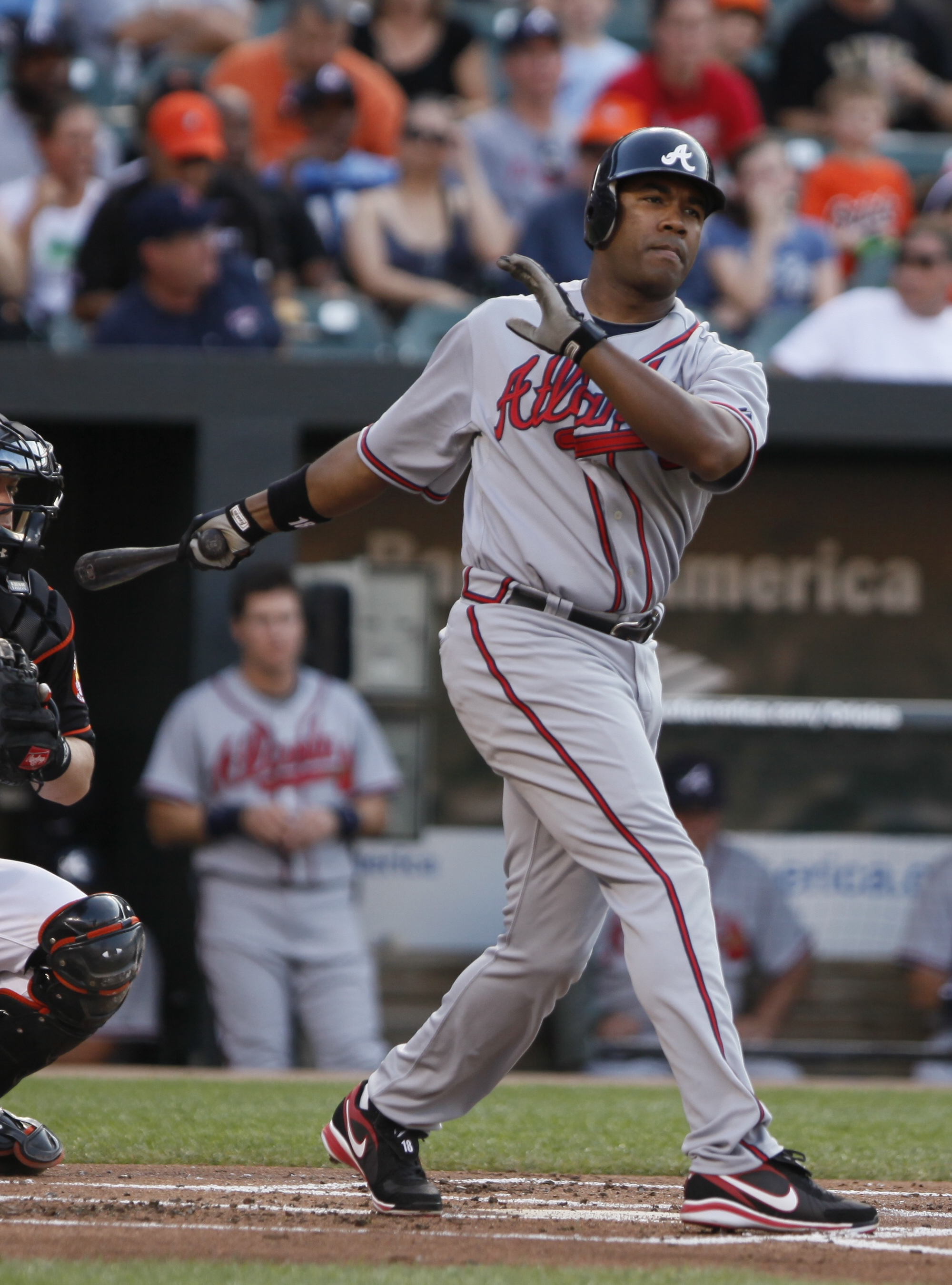
Anderson with the Braves in 2009

On February 24, 2009, Anderson agreed to a one-year deal with the Atlanta Braves for $2.5 million.

On July 2, 2009, Anderson hit the first career pinch-hit home run of his career.

On October 1, 2009, Anderson became the 89th MLB player to reach 2,500 base hits, getting a single off Washington Nationals pitcher Garrett Mock.

=== Los Angeles Dodgers ===
On March 3, 2010, Anderson agreed to a minor league deal with the Los Angeles Dodgers. He made the 25-man opening day roster as a reserve outfielder. In his first at bat with the Dodgers, he hit a pinch-hit single off Brendan Donnelly, his former Angels teammate. His first home run with the Dodgers came on April 22, when he hit a pinch-hit 2-run homer against the Cincinnati Reds.

Anderson was designated for assignment by the Dodgers on August 8, after hitting only .181 in 155 at bats, and he was granted his release on August 10.

== Retirement ==
On March 1, 2011, Anderson announced his retirement in a statement issued by the Angels. In 2012, he was an Angels pregame and postgame reporter during home games and some road games on Fox Sports West.

He appeared on the ballot for the National Baseball Hall of Fame and Museum 2016 election and earned one vote.

In 2016, Anderson was inducted into the Angels' Hall of Fame.

== Highlights ==
=== Awards ===
- Three-time All-Star (2002–2003, 2005)
- All-Star Game MVP (2003)
- The Sporting News Rookie of the Year (1995)
- Two-time Silver Slugger Award winner (2002–03)
- Top 10 in voting for MVP (2002, 4th)

== Personal life and death ==
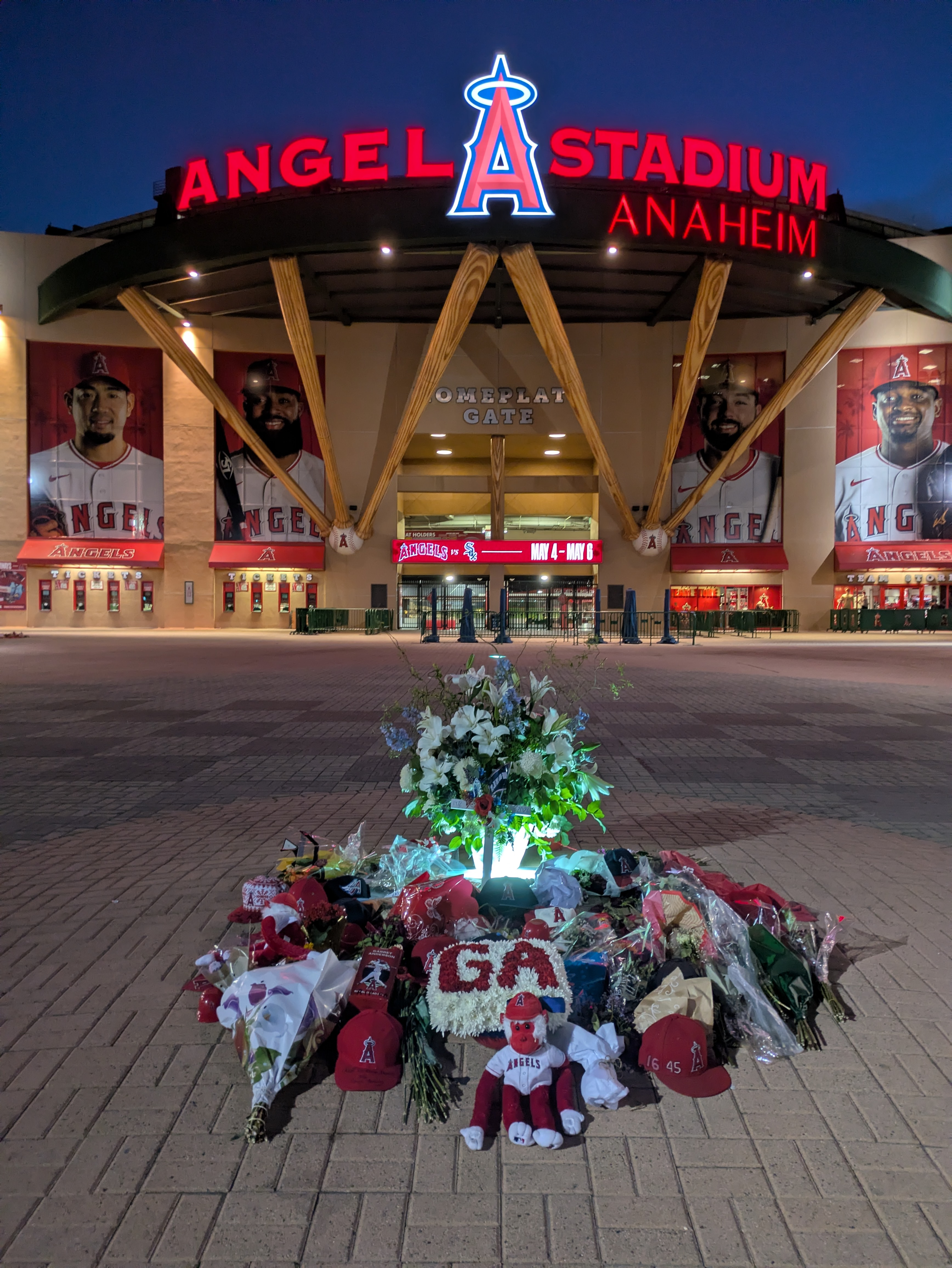
Memorial in honor of Anderson outside of Angel Stadium following Anderson's passing in April 2026

Anderson met his wife, Teresa, in junior high school. They had three children. He was a practicing Christian.

Anderson died on April 16, 2026, at his home in Newport Beach, California. The cause of death was later revealed to be acute necrotizing pancreatitis. Prior to their home game on April 17, the Angels held a moment of silence for Anderson and played a tribute video. The Angels are wearing a "GA" patch in his honor for the remainder of the 2026 season.

== See also ==
- List of Major League Baseball career home run leaders
- List of Major League Baseball doubles records
- List of Major League Baseball career hits leaders
- List of Major League Baseball career doubles leaders
- List of Major League Baseball career runs batted in leaders
- List of Major League Baseball career total bases leaders
- List of Major League Baseball annual doubles leaders
- List of Major League Baseball single-game hits leaders

Awards and achievements
Preceded by Edgar Martínez	American League Player of the Month; July 1995	Succeeded by Albert Belle
