= 2001 Arizona Diamondbacks season =

Major League Baseball season

2001 Arizona Diamondbacks
- World Series champions National League champions National League West champions
- League: National League
- Division: West
- Ballpark: Bank One Ballpark
- City: Phoenix, Arizona
- Record: 92–70 (.568)
- Divisional place: 1st
- Owners: Jerry Colangelo
- General managers: Joe Garagiola Jr.
- Managers: Bob Brenly
- Television: Fox Sports Net Arizona; KTVK (3TV) (Thom Brennaman, Rod Allen, Greg Schulte, Jim Traber, Joe Garagiola)
- Radio: KTAR (620 AM) (Thom Brennaman, Rod Allen, Greg Schulte, Jim Traber, Jeff Munn); KSUN (Spanish) (Richard Saenz, Oscar Soria, Miguel Quintana)
- Stats: ESPN.com; Baseball Reference

The 2001 Arizona Diamondbacks season was the franchise's 4th season in Major League Baseball and their 4th season at Bank One Ballpark in Phoenix, Arizona, as members of the National League West.

They looked to improve on their 2000 season. They had to contend in what was a strong division.

Arizona had the best one-two pitching combination in the majors: Curt Schilling and Randy Johnson (the NL Cy Young award winner), who combined for 43 victories. Outfielder Luis Gonzalez slugged 57 home runs. They finished the regular season with a record of 92–70, which was good enough for the division title.

In the playoffs, they won their NLDS matchup vs. St. Louis on a walk-off hit by Tony Womack. They defeated the Braves in five games in the NLCS. In the World Series, they won a dramatic seven-game series against the New York Yankees on a walk-off hit by Gonzalez, against Yankees closer Mariano Rivera. The Diamondbacks became the fastest expansion franchise in Major League history to win a World Series title in just their fourth season. The championship remains the only one won by an Arizona-based sports team.

== Offseason ==
- November 2, 2000: Ken Huckaby was signed as a free agent with the Arizona Diamondbacks.
- December 8, 2000: Mark Grace signed as a free agent with the Arizona Diamondbacks.
- December 15, 2000: Midre Cummings was signed as a free agent with the Arizona Diamondbacks.
- March 8, 2001: Mike Mohler was signed as a free agent with the Arizona Diamondbacks.

== Spring training ==
The 2001 Arizona Diamondbacks held their 4th spring training at Tucson Electric Park in Tucson, Arizona.

== Regular season ==
- Randy Johnson recorded 20 strikeouts in nine innings against the Cincinnati Reds on May 8, 2001. Johnson shares the record with Roger Clemens, Kerry Wood, and most recently Max Scherzer.
- On July 19, 2001, Johnson set another record when the previous night's game against the San Diego Padres was delayed by two electrical explosions that knocked out a light tower in Qualcomm Stadium. When the game resumed the following day, Johnson replaced the original starter Curt Schilling in the top of the third inning. He pitched the next seven innings and struck out 16 Padres. Johnson set a new record for strikeouts in a relief appearance, a record that was set 88 years previously by Walter Johnson, who struck out 15 batters in 11 1/3 innings on July 25, 1913.
- Johnson went on to win 20 games for the second time in his career while striking out over 300 hitters for the fourth consecutive year. On October 2, 2001, Randy Johnson earned his 200th career win.

=== Opening Day starters ===
- Jay Bell
- David Dellucci
- Steve Finley
- Luis Gonzalez
- Mark Grace
- Damian Miller
- Randy Johnson
- Matt Williams
- Tony Womack

=== Season standings ===
NL West
Team	W	L	Pct.	GB	Home	Road
Arizona Diamondbacks	92	70	.568	—	48‍–‍33	44‍–‍37
San Francisco Giants	90	72	.556	2	49‍–‍32	41‍–‍40
Los Angeles Dodgers	86	76	.531	6	44‍–‍37	42‍–‍39
San Diego Padres	79	83	.488	13	35‍–‍46	44‍–‍37
Colorado Rockies	73	89	.451	19	41‍–‍40	32‍–‍49

=== Record vs. opponents ===
2001 National League record Source: MLB Standings Grid – 2001
Team	AZ	ATL	CHC	CIN	COL	FLA	HOU	LAD	MIL	MON	NYM	PHI	PIT	SD	SF	STL	AL
Arizona	—	5–2	6–3	5–1	13–6	4–2	2–4	10–9	3–3	3–3	3–3	3–4	4–2	12–7	10–9	2–4	7–8
Atlanta	2–5	—	4–2	4–2	4–2	9–10	3–3	2–5	3–3	13–6	10–9	10–9	5–1	3–3	4–2	3–3	9–9
Chicago	3–6	2–4	—	13–4	3–3	3–3	8–9	4–2	8–9	3–3	4–2	4–2	10–6	2–4	3–3	9–8	9–6
Cincinnati	1–5	2–4	4–13	—	3–6	4–2	6–11	4–2	6–10	4–2	4–2	2–4	9–8	2–4	4–2	7–10	4–11
Colorado	6–13	2–4	3–3	6–3	—	4–2	2–4	8–11	5–1	3–4	4–3	2–4	2–4	9–10	9–10	6–3	2–10
Florida	2–4	10–9	3–3	2–4	2–4	—	3–3	2–5	4–2	12–7	7–12	5–14	4–2	3–4	2–4	3–3	12–6
Houston	4–2	3–3	9–8	11–6	4–2	3–3	—	2–4	12–5	6–0	3–3	3–3	9–8	3–6	3–3	9–7	9–6
Los Angeles	9–10	5–2	2–4	2–4	11–8	5–2	4–2	—	5–1	2–4	2–4	3–3	7–2	9–10	11–8	3–3	6–9
Milwaukee	3–3	3–3	9–8	10–6	1–5	2–4	5–12	1–5	—	4–2	3–3	3–3	6–11	1–5	5–4	7–10	5–10
Montreal	3–3	6–13	3–3	2–4	4–3	7–12	0–6	4–2	2–4	—	8–11	9–10	5–1	3–3	2–5	2–4	8–10
New York	3–3	9–10	2–4	2–4	3–4	12–7	3–3	4–2	3–3	11–8	—	11–8	4–2	1–5	3–4	1–5	10–8
Philadelphia	4–3	9–10	2–4	4–2	4–2	14–5	3–3	3–3	3–3	10–9	8–11	—	5–1	5–2	3–3	2–4	7–11
Pittsburgh	2–4	1–5	6–10	8–9	4–2	2–4	8–9	2–7	11–6	1–5	2–4	1–5	—	2–4	1–5	3–14	8–7
San Diego	7–12	3–3	4–2	4–2	10–9	4–3	6–3	10–9	5–1	3–3	5–1	2–5	4–2	—	5–14	1–5	6–9
San Francisco	9–10	2–4	3–3	2–4	10–9	4–2	3–3	8–11	4–5	5–2	4–3	3–3	5–1	14–5	—	4–2	10–5
St. Louis	4–2	3–3	8–9	10–7	3–6	3–3	7–9	3–3	10–7	4–2	5–1	4–2	14–3	5–1	2–4	—	8–7

Diamondbacks vs. American League
Team	AL West				AL Central	
Team	ANA	OAK	SEA	TEX	DET	KC
Arizona	2–1	0–3	1–2	–	2–1	2–1

=== Notable transactions ===
- June 5, 2001: Dan Uggla was drafted by the Arizona Diamondbacks in the 11th round of the 2001 amateur draft. Uggla signed June 6, 2001.
- June 5, 2001: Ian Kinsler was drafted by the Arizona Diamondbacks in the 26th round of the 2001 amateur draft, but did not sign.

=== Roster ===
2001 Arizona Diamondbacks
Roster
Pitchers: 34 Brian Anderson; 43 Miguel Batista; 47 Nick Bierbrodt; 54 Troy Brohawn; 55 Robert Ellis; 50 Geraldo Guzmán; 51 Randy Johnson; 49 Byung-hyun Kim; 57 Eric Knott; 58 Mike Koplove; 32 Albie Lopez; 31 Matt Mantei; 52 Mike Mohler; 36 Mike Morgan; 41 Bret Prinz; 27 Armando Reynoso; 56 Erik Sabel; 38 Curt Schilling; 36,46 Russ Springer; 22 Greg Swindell; 40 Bobby Witt	Catchers: 48 Rod Barajas; 8 Mike DiFelice; 45 Ken Huckaby; 26 Damian Miller; 39 Chad Moeller; Infielders: 33 Jay Bell; 10 Alex Cintrón; 28 Greg Colbrunn; 4 Craig Counsell; 44 Erubiel Durazo; 17 Mark Grace; 2 Juan Sosa; 37 Junior Spivey; 9 Matt Williams; 5 Tony Womack	Outfielders: 29 Danny Bautista; 6 Ryan Christenson; 6 Jason Conti; 13 Midre Cummings; 19 Jack Cust; 25 David Dellucci; 12 Steve Finley; 20 Luis Gonzalez; 16 Reggie Sanders; Other batters: 61 Lyle Overbay; 8 Rob Ryan	Manager: 15 Bob Brenly; Coaches: 3 Bob Melvin (Bench); 21 Dwayne Murphy (Hitting); 14 Eddie Rodríguez (1st Base); 53 Glenn Sherlock (Bullpen); 35 Chris Speier (3rd Base); 32,24 Bob Welch (Pitching)

=== Game log ===
Legend
Diamondbacks Win	Diamondbacks Loss	Game postponed

2001 Regular Season Game Log (92–70) (Home: 48–33; Road: 44–37)
April (13–12) (Home: 8–8; Road: 5–4)

#	Date	Opponent	Score	Win	Loss	Save	Stadium	Attendance	Record	Streak
1	April 3	@ Dodgers	3–2	Johnson (1–0)	Nunez (0–1)	Mantei (1)	Dodger Stadium	22,927	1–0	W1
2	April 4	@ Dodgers	7–2	Schilling (1–0)	Dreifort (0–1)	—	Dodger Stadium	34,301	2–0	W2
3	April 5	@ Dodgers	5–7	Ashby (1–0)	Anderson (0–1)	Shaw (2)	Dodger Stadium	20,542	2–1	L1
4	April 6	Cardinals	9–12	Hermanson (1–0)	Reynoso (0–1)	—	Bank One Ballpark	46,079	2–2	L2
5	April 7	Cardinals	4–8	Kile (1–1)	Witt (0–1)	—	Bank One Ballpark	34,404	2–3	L3
6	April 8	Cardinals	4–9	Ankiel (1–0)	Johnson (1–1)	Timlin (1)	Bank One Ballpark	36,714	2–4	L4
7	April 10	Dodgers	2–0	Schilling (2–0)	Brown (0–1)	—	Bank One Ballpark	29,191	3–4	W1
8	April 11	Dodgers	5–11	Dreifort (1–1)	Anderson (0–2)	—	Bank One Ballpark	25,974	3–5	L1
9	April 12	Dodgers	4–5	Ashby (2–0)	Reynoso (0–2)	Shaw (3)	Bank One Ballpark	29,465	3–6	L2
10	April 13	@ Rockies	7–3	Johnson (2–1)	Bohanon (0–2)	—	Coors Field	38,564	4–6	W1
11	April 14	@ Rockies	8–9	Myers (1–1)	Kim (0–1)	Jimenez (3)	Coors Field	42,319	4–7	L1
12	April 15	@ Rockies	7–10 (10)	Estrada (1–1)	Brohawn (0–1)	—	Coors Field	36,841	4–8	L2
13	April 16	@ Cardinals	2–1	Ellis (1–0)	Morris (1–2)	Mantei (2)	Busch Memorial Stadium	25,625	5–8	W1
14	April 17	@ Cardinals	17–4	Reynoso (1–2)	Hermanson (1–1)	—	Busch Memorial Stadium	28,517	6–8	W2
15	April 18	@ Cardinals	1–3	Kile (2–2)	Johnson (2–2)	Kline (2)	Busch Memorial Stadium	29,144	6–9	L1
16	April 20	Rockies	3–2	Kim (1–1)	White (0–2)	—	Bank One Ballpark	32,011	7–9	W1
17	April 21	Rockies	10–5	Ellis (2–0)	Villone (0–1)	—	Bank One Ballpark	31,724	8–9	W2
18	April 22	Rockies	1–2	Astacio (3–1)	Reynoso (1–3)	Jimenez (5)	Bank One Ballpark	31,076	8–10	L1
19	April 23	Marlins	9–0	Johnson (3–2)	Dempster (2–2)	—	Bank One Ballpark	23,328	9–10	W1
20	April 24	Marlins	9–8	Prinz (1–0)	Almanza (0–1)	Springer (1)	Bank One Ballpark	24,135	10–10	W2
21	April 25	Marlins	10–7	Schilling (3–0)	Grilli (2–2)	Prinz (1)	Bank One Ballpark	23,097	11–10	W3
22	April 26	Braves	13–6	Ellis (3–0)	Maddux (2–2)	—	Bank One Ballpark	27,362	12–10	W4
23	April 27	Braves	0–9	Burkett (1–3)	Reynoso (1–4)	—	Bank One Ballpark	32,663	12–11	L1
24	April 28	Braves	1–3	Glavine (4–1)	Johnson (3–3)	Rocker (6)	Bank One Ballpark	45,264	12–12	L2
25	April 29	Braves	7–5	Sabel (1–0)	Perez (1–4)	Brohawn (1)	Bank One Ballpark	34,356	13–12	W1

May (18–10) (Home: 5–4; Road: 13–6)

#	Date	Opponent	Score	Win	Loss	Save	Stadium	Attendance	Record	Streak
26	May 1	@ Expos	8–3	Schilling (4–0)	Reames (2–2)	—	Olympic Stadium	4,340	14–12	W2
27	May 2	@ Expos	3–4	Armas (1–4)	Anderson (0–3)	Lloyd (1)	Olympic Stadium	4,352	14–13	L1
28	May 3	@ Expos	2–1	Kim (2–1)	Lloyd (2–1)	Prinz (2)	Olympic Stadium	4,788	15–13	W1
29	May 4	@ Mets	2–4	Reed (4–1)	Batista (0–1)	Franco (1)	Shea Stadium	36,945	15–14	L1
30	May 5	@ Mets	1–8	Rusch (2–1)	Ellis (3–1)	—	Shea Stadium	35,630	15–15	L2
31	May 6	@ Mets	8–2	Schilling (5–0)	Trachsel (1–5)	—	Shea Stadium	37,673	16–15	W1
32	May 7	Reds	4–5 (10)	Graves (1–0)	Swindell (0–1)	—	Bank One Ballpark	25,636	16–16	L1
33	May 8	Reds	4–3 (11)	Brohawn (1–1)	Graves (1–1)	—	Bank One Ballpark	29,817	17–16	W1
34	May 9	Reds	5–2	Batista (1–1)	Mercado (1–2)	Prinz (3)	Bank One Ballpark	26,150	18–16	W2
35	May 11	Phillies	1–5	Wolf (3–4)	Schilling (5–1)	—	Bank One Ballpark	30,291	18–17	L1
36	May 12	Phillies	5–6 (10)	Bottalico (2–2)	Batista (1–2)	Mesa (10)	Bank One Ballpark	33,515	18–18	L2
37	May 13	Phillies	6–1	Johnson (4–3)	Person (3–4)	—	Bank One Ballpark	32,223	19–18	W1
38	May 15	@ Reds	5–1	Sabel (2–0)	Wohlers (1–1)	Kim (1)	Cinergy Field	19,201	20–18	W2
39	May 16	@ Reds	2–1	Schilling (6–1)	Reith (0–1)	Kim (2)	Cinergy Field	21,843	21–18	W3
40	May 17	@ Reds	7–2	Anderson (1–3)	Brower (2–2)	—	Cinergy Field	23,723	22–18	W4
41	May 18	@ Cubs	4–0	Johnson (5–3)	Lieber (3–3)	—	Wrigley Field	37,830	23–18	W5
42	May 19	@ Cubs	2–6	Wood (2–4)	Batista (1–3)	—	Wrigley Field	40,153	23–19	L1
43	May 20	@ Cubs	5–6	Tapani (6–1)	Ellis (3–2)	Fassero (10)	Wrigley Field	39,350	23–20	L2
44	May 21	Giants	4–2	Schilling (7–1)	Rueter (4–5)	—	Bank One Ballpark	28,628	24–20	W1
45	May 22	Giants	12–8	Anderson (2–3)	Ortiz (6–3)	—	Bank One Ballpark	33,323	25–20	W2
46	May 23	Giants	1–5	Gardner (1–3)	Johnson (5–4)	—	Bank One Ballpark	34,922	25–21	L1
47	May 24	@ Padres	1–3	Serrano (2–1)	Brohawn (1–2)	Hoffman (10)	Qualcomm Stadium	19,450	25–22	L2
48	May 25	@ Padres	7–1	Sabel (3–0)	Jones (2–6)	—	Qualcomm Stadium	29,965	26–22	W1
49	May 26	@ Padres	3–1	Schilling (8–1)	Eaton (6–3)	—	Qualcomm Stadium	49,300	27–22	W2
50	May 27	@ Padres	6–4	Swindell (1–1)	Hoffman (2–2)	Prinz (4)	Qualcomm Stadium	34,053	28–22	W3
51	May 28	@ Giants	2–1 (12)	Batista (2–3)	Worrell (1–1)	—	Pacific Bell Park	41,341	29–22	W4
52	May 29	@ Giants	1–0 (18)	Batista (3–3)	Vogelsong (0–1)	Swindell (1)	Pacific Bell Park	39,709	30–22	W5
53	May 30	@ Giants	4–3	Ellis (4–2)	Hernandez (3–8)	Prinz (5)	Pacific Bell Park	40,313	31–22	W6

June (18–9) (Home: 12–6; Road: 6–3)

#	Date	Opponent	Score	Win	Loss	Save	Stadium	Attendance	Record	Streak
54	June 1	Padres	4–2	Schilling (9–1)	Williams (5–4)	Kim (3)	Bank One Ballpark	32,234	32–22	W7
55	June 2	Padres	2–1	Prinz (2–0)	Davey (0–1)	—	Bank One Ballpark	34,325	33–22	W8
56	June 3	Padres	8–4	Johnson (6–4)	Jarvis (3–5)	—	Bank One Ballpark	37,500	34–22	W9
57	June 4	Dodgers	4–8	Park (7–4)	Reynoso (1–5)	—	Bank One Ballpark	26,485	34–23	L1
58	June 5	Dodgers	5–6	Herges (3–4)	Kim (2–2)	Shaw (18)	Bank One Ballpark	32,699	34–24	L2
59	June 6	Dodgers	4–1	Schilling (10–1)	Prokopec (6–2)	—	Bank One Ballpark	31,046	35–24	W1
60	June 7	Dodgers	13–9	Batista (4–3)	Dreifort (3–5)	—	Bank One Ballpark	32,658	36–24	W2
61	June 8	@ Royals	11–4	Johnson (7–4)	Byrd (0–2)	—	Kauffman Stadium	20,349	37–24	W3
62	June 9	@ Royals	2–3	Stein (3–4)	Reynoso (1–6)	Hernandez (9)	Kauffman Stadium	26,879	37–25	L1
63	June 10	@ Royals	12–5	Ellis (5–2)	Reichert (5–6)	—	Kauffman Stadium	16,573	38–25	W1
64	June 12	Cubs	2–6	Wood (6–4)	Schilling (10–2)	—	Bank One Ballpark	40,191	38–26	L1
65	June 13	Cubs	13–3	Bierbrodt (1–0)	Tapani (8–2)	—	Bank One Ballpark	33,670	39–26	W1
66	June 14	Cubs	3–2	Johnson (8–4)	Bere (4–3)	Swindell (2)	Bank One Ballpark	40,093	40–26	W2
67	June 15	Tigers	2–5	Holt (5–5)	Brohawn (1–3)	Anderson (5)	Bank One Ballpark	31,683	40–27	L1
68	June 16	Tigers	3–1	Ellis (6–2)	Blair (0–1)	Prinz (6)	Bank One Ballpark	35,028	41–27	W1
69	June 17	Tigers	8–3	Schilling (11–2)	Mlicki (4–8)	—	Bank One Ballpark	39,760	42–27	W2
70	June 19	@ Dodgers	9–2	Johnson (9–4)	Dreifort (4–6)	—	Dodger Stadium	31,160	43–27	W3
71	June 20	@ Dodgers	3–4	Shaw (3–2)	Sabel (3–1)	—	Dodger Stadium	35,561	43–28	L1
72	June 21	@ Rockies	14–5	Bierbrodt (2–0)	Hampton (9–3)	—	Coors Field	40,036	44–28	W1
73	June 22	@ Rockies	5–4 (10)	Swindell (2–1)	Jimenez (3–1)	Prinz (7)	Coors Field	44,655	45–28	W2
74	June 23	@ Rockies	9–5	Kim (3–2)	White (1–4)	—	Coors Field	41,612	46–28	W3
75	June 24	@ Rockies	6–7	Neagle (6–2)	Johnson (9–5)	Jimenez (12)	Coors Field	41,682	46–29	L1
76	June 25	Astros	0–6	Miller (9–3)	Batista (4–4)	—	Bank One Ballpark	27,230	46–30	L2
77	June 26	Astros	7–10	Dotel (5–4)	Bierbrodt (2–1)	Wagner (16)	Bank One Ballpark	30,566	46–31	L3
78	June 27	Astros	7–5	Schilling (12–2)	Elarton (4–8)	—	Bank One Ballpark	28,802	47–31	W1
79	June 29	Rockies	5–3	Johnson (10–5)	Astacio (5–9)	Kim (4)	Bank One Ballpark	34,291	48–31	W2
80	June 30	Rockies	6–5	Brohawn (2–3)	Davis (0–2)	Prinz (8)	Bank One Ballpark	36,165	49–31	W3

July (11–15) (Home: 4–8; Road: 7–7)

#	Date	Opponent	Score	Win	Loss	Save	Stadium	Attendance	Record	Streak
81	July 1	Rockies	5–4 (13)	Prinz (3–0)	White (1–6)	—	Bank One Ballpark	31,999	50–31	W4
82	July 3	@ Astros	5–6	Mlicki (5–8)	Schilling (12–3)	Wagner (18)	Enron Field	40,982	50–32	L1
83	July 4	@ Astros	3–2	Johnson (10–5)	Reynolds (8–7)	Kim (5)	Enron Field	41,216	51–32	W1
84	July 5	@ Astros	1–5	Oswalt (7–1)	Ellis (6–3)	—	Enron Field	35,112	51–33	L1
85	July 6	Athletics	0–3	Mulder (9–6)	Anderson (2–4)	—	Bank One Ballpark	34,008	51–34	L2
86	July 7	Athletics	1–5	Hudson (9–5)	Batista (4–5)	—	Bank One Ballpark	36,978	51–35	L3
87	July 8	Athletics	1–2	Zito (6–6)	Schilling (12–4)	Isringhausen (17)	Bank One Ballpark	31,927	51–36	L4
–	July 10	72nd All-Star Game	AL defeats NL 4–1 at Safeco Field							
88	July 12	@ Angels	1–4	Schoeneweis (7–8)	Anderson (2–5)	Percival (22)	Edison International Field of Anaheim	18,724	51–37	L5
89	July 13	@ Angels	6–2	Schilling (13–4)	Valdez (5–5)	—	Edison International Field of Anaheim	32,777	52–37	W1
90	July 14	@ Angels	7–5	Prinz (4–0)	Percival (3–2)	Kim (6)	Edison International Field of Anaheim	30,044	53–37	W2
91	July 15	@ Mariners	0–8	Sele (11–1)	Ellis (6–4)	—	Safeco Field	45,855	53–38	L1
92	July 16	@ Mariners	5–3	Batista (5–5)	Halama (6–6)	Kim (7)	Safeco Field	45,770	54–38	W1
93	July 17	@ Mariners	1–6	Abbott (8–2)	Anderson (2–6)	—	Safeco Field	45,894	54–39	L1
–	July 18	@ Padres	Suspended (power failure, continuation July 19)							
94	July 19	@ Padres	3–0	Johnson (12–5)	Williams (6–8)	—	Qualcomm Stadium	22,184	55–39	W1
95	July 19	@ Padres	4–8	Jarvis (7–7)	Ellis (6–5)	Hoffman (21)	Qualcomm Stadium	22,583	55–40	L1
96	July 20	@ Giants	0–1	Hernandez (8–11)	Batista (5–6)	Nen (29)	Pacific Bell Park	41,287	55–41	L2
97	July 21	@ Giants	9–2	Schilling (14–4)	Jensen (0–2)	—	Pacific Bell Park	41,669	56–41	W1
98	July 22	@ Giants	12–4	Anderson (3–6)	Rueter (9–7)	—	Pacific Bell Park	41,901	57–41	W2
99	July 23	Padres	2–4	Williams (7–8)	Bierbrodt (2–2)	Hoffman (23)	Bank One Ballpark	28,687	57–42	L1
100	July 24	Padres	11–0	Johnson (13–5)	Jarvis (7–8)	—	Bank One Ballpark	36,940	58–42	W1
101	July 25	Padres	9–6	Batista (6–6)	Hitchcock (2–1)	Kim (8)	Bank One Ballpark	28,376	59–42	W2
102	July 26	Giants	3–11	Hernandez (9–11)	Schilling (14–5)	—	Bank One Ballpark	33,666	59–43	L1
103	July 27	Giants	5–9	Rueter (10–7)	Anderson (3–7)	—	Bank One Ballpark	35,853	59–44	L2
104	July 28	Giants	4–11	Ortiz (12–3)	Lopez (5–13)	—	Bank One Ballpark	47,570	59–45	L3
105	July 29	Giants	3–4	Estes (8–5)	Kim (3–3)	Nen (30)	Bank One Ballpark	38,093	59–46	L4
106	July 31	Expos	3–1	Schilling (15–5)	Munoz (0–1)	—	Bank One Ballpark	27,726	60–46	W1

August (18–11) (Home: 10–4; Road: 8–7)

#	Date	Opponent	Score	Win	Loss	Save	Stadium	Attendance	Record	Streak
107	August 1	Expos	5–8	Thurman (6–7)	Anderson (3–8)	Stewart (1)	Bank One Ballpark	25,668	60–47	L1
108	August 2	Expos	0–1	Vazquez (10–10)	Lopez (5–14)	Stewart (2)	Bank One Ballpark	28,688	60–48	L2
109	August 3	Mets	7–0	Johnson (14–5)	Leiter (6–9)	—	Bank One Ballpark	43,806	61–48	W1
110	August 4	Mets	2–4	Appier (6–10)	Batista (6–7)	Benitez (25)	Bank One Ballpark	36,750	61–49	L1
111	August 5	Mets	2–1	Schilling (16–5)	White (3–2)	Kim (9)	Bank One Ballpark	36,870	62–49	W1
112	August 7	@ Marlins	4–10	Clement (7–7)	Lopez (5–15)	—	Pro Player Stadium	13,050	62–50	L1
113	August 8	@ Marlins	7–1	Johnson (15–5)	Sanchez (2–1)	—	Pro Player Stadium	17,261	63–50	W1
114	August 9	@ Marlins	1–3	Darensbourg (1–0)	Swindell (2–2)	Alfonseca (23)	Pro Player Stadium	15,615	63–51	L1
115	August 10	@ Braves	7–0	Schilling (17–5)	Millwood (2–5)	—	Turner Field	40,101	64–51	W1
116	August 11	@ Braves	3–1	Batista (7–7)	Marquis (2–4)	Kim (10)	Turner Field	48,367	65–51	W2
117	August 12	@ Braves	9–1	Lopez (6–15)	Maddux (15–7)	—	Turner Field	34,702	66–51	W3
118	August 13	Pirates	3–0	Johnson (16–5)	Anderson (6–13)	—	Bank One Ballpark	32,386	67–51	W4
119	August 14	Pirates	4–3 (10)	Batista (8–7)	Marte (0–1)	—	Bank One Ballpark	31,006	68–51	W5
120	August 15	Pirates	5–2	Schilling (18–5)	Williams (1–5)	—	Bank One Ballpark	28,703	69–51	W6
121	August 17	Cubs	7–2	Lopez (7–15)	Tapani (8–10)	Kim (11)	Bank One Ballpark	42,667	70–51	W7
122	August 18	Cubs	5–3	Johnson (17–5)	Bere (8–7)	Kim (12)	Bank One Ballpark	47,489	71–51	W8
123	August 19	Cubs	13–6	Witt (1–1)	Ohman (0–1)	—	Bank One Ballpark	44,449	72–51	W9
124	August 21	@ Pirates	2–4	Olivares (6–7)	Schilling (18–6)	Fetters (4)	PNC Park	35,131	72–52	L1
125	August 22	@ Pirates	6–0	Lopez (8–15)	Beimel (5–10)	—	PNC Park	26,531	73–52	W1
126	August 23	@ Pirates	1–5	McKnight (2–3)	Johnson (17–6)	Fetters (5)	PNC Park	30,794	73–53	L1
127	August 24	@ Phillies	5–6	Daal (12–4)	Anderson (3–9)	Mesa (33)	Veterans Stadium	35,173	73–54	L2
128	August 25	@ Phillies	4–3	Batista (9–7)	Coggin (4–3)	Kim (13)	Veterans Stadium	23,953	74–54	W1
129	August 26	@ Phillies	4–3 (10)	Kim (4–3)	Politte (0–2)	—	Veterans Stadium	35,093	75–54	W2
130	August 27	@ Phillies	1–2	Person (12–6)	Lopez (8–16)	Mesa (34)	Veterans Stadium	18,303	75–55	L1
131	August 28	Giants	4–1	Johnson (18–6)	Hernandez (11–13)	Kim' (14)	Bank One Ballpark	41,502	76–55	W1
132	August 29	Giants	2–0	Witt (2–1)	Rueter (12–10)	Kim (15)	Bank One Ballpark	31,990	77–55	W2
133	August 30	Giants	5–13	Schmidt (10–7)	Batista (9–8)	—	Bank One Ballpark	34,269	77–56	L1
134	August 31 (1)	@ Padres	4–1	Schilling (19–6)	Jodie (0–2)	Prinz (9)	Qualcomm Stadium	N/A	78–56	W1
135	August 31 (2)	@ Padres	5–6	Nunez (3–2)	Prinz (4–1)	Hoffman (34)	Qualcomm Stadium	24,372	78–57	L1

September (10–11) (Home: 6–3; Road: 4–8)

#	Date	Opponent	Score	Win	Loss	Save	Stadium	Attendance	Record	Streak
136	September 1	@ Padres	5–7	Lee (1–0)	Kim (4–4)	Hoffman (35)	Qualcomm Stadium	34,252	78–58	L2
137	September 2	@ Padres	0–1 (13)	Serrano (3–2)	Kim (4–5)	—	Qualcomm Stadium	23,475	78–59	L3
138	September 4	@ Giants	2–5	Schmidt (11–7)	Swindell (2–3)	Nen (39)	Pacific Bell Park	40,869	78–60	L4
139	September 5	@ Giants	7–2	Schilling (20–6)	Ortiz (14–9)	—	Pacific Bell Park	40,972	79–60	W1
140	September 6	@ Giants	5–9	Fultz (3–1)	Lopez (8–17)	—	Pacific Bell Park	41,155	79–61	L1
141	September 7	Padres	3–4	Fikac (2–0)	Swindell (2–4)	Hoffman (36)	Bank One Ballpark	32,184	79–62	L2
142	September 8	Padres	8–6 (10)	Kim (5–5)	Serrano (3–3)	—	Bank One Ballpark	39,929	80–62	W1
143	September 9	Padres	8–2	Witt (3–1)	Jones (8–18)	Kim (16)	Bank One Ballpark	33,741	81–62	W2
–	September 11	Rockies	Postponed (9/11 attacks, makeup October 2)							
–	September 12	Rockies	Postponed (9/11 attacks, makeup October 3)							
–	September 13	Rockies	Postponed (9/11 attacks, makeup October 4)							
–	September 14	@ Brewers	Postponed (9/11 attacks, makeup October 5)							
–	September 15	@ Brewers	Postponed (9/11 attacks, makeup October 6)							
–	September 16	@ Brewers	Postponed (9/11 attacks, makeup October 7)							
144	September 17	@ Rockies	7–3	Johnson (19–6)	Davis (1–4)	—	Coors Field	31,111	82–62	W3
145	September 18	@ Rockies	9–10	Myers (2–3)	Kim (5–6)	—	Coors Field	30,552	82–63	L1
146	September 19	@ Rockies	2–8	Hampton (14–11)	Lopez (8–18)	—	Coors Field	30,301	82–64	L2
147	September 20	@ Dodgers	2–3 (13)	Prokopec (8–6)	Swindell (2–5)	—	Dodger Stadium	31,776	82–65	L3
148	September 21	@ Dodgers	10–0	Batista (10–8)	Mulholland (1–1)	—	Dodger Stadium	44,321	83–65	W1
149	September 22	@ Dodgers	5–6 (11)	Gagne (5–7)	Koplove (0–1)	—	Dodger Stadium	40,215	83–66	L1
150	September 23	@ Dodgers	6–1	Schilling (21–6)	Adams (12–8)	—	Dodger Stadium	48,410	84–66	W1
151	September 25	Brewers	4–9	D'Amico (2–3)	Lopez (8–19)	—	Bank One Ballpark	35,032	84–67	L1
152	September 26	Brewers	15–9	Witt (4–1)	Buddie (0–1)	—	Bank One Ballpark	30,658	85–67	W1
153	September 27	Brewers	13–11	Johnson (20–6)	Quevedo (4–5)	Kim (17)	Bank One Ballpark	28,359	86–67	W2
154	September 28	Dodgers	4–3 (11)	Morgan (1–0)	Trombley (3–8)	—	Bank One Ballpark	46,838	87–67	W3
155	September 29	Dodgers	8–1	Batista (11–8)	Baldwin (9–11)	—	Bank One Ballpark	43,936	88–67	W4
156	September 30	Dodgers	1–2	Park (15–11)	Swindell (2–6)	Shaw (40)	Bank One Ballpark	43,138	88–68	L1

October (4–2) (Home: 3–0; Road: 1–2)

#	Date	Opponent	Score	Win	Loss	Save	Stadium	Attendance	Record	Streak
157	October 2	Rockies	10–1	Johnson (21–6)	Hampton (14–13)	—	Bank One Ballpark	36,263	89–68	W1
158	October 3	Rockies	4–3	Schilling (22–6)	Chacón (6–10)	Kim (18)	Bank One Ballpark	32,521	90–68	W2
159	October 4	Rockies	5–4	Anderson (4–9)	Neagle (9–8)	Kim (19)	Bank One Ballpark	29,382	91–68	W3
160	October 5	@ Brewers	5–0	Lopez (9–19)	Levrault (6–10)	—	Miller Park	24,700	92–68	W4
161	October 6	@ Brewers	4–5	Fox (5–2)	Sabel (3–2)	—	Miller Park	40,038	92–69	L1
162	October 7	@ Brewers	5–15	Sheets (11–10)	Knott (0–1)	—	Miller Park	31,761	92–70	L2

== Player stats ==
= Indicates team leader

=== Batting ===
Note: Pos = Position; G = Games played; AB = At bats; H = Hits; HR = Home runs; RBI = Runs batted in; Avg. = Batting average

Pos.	Player	G	AB	H	HR	RBI	Avg.
C	Damian Miller	123	380	103	13	47	.271
1B	Mark Grace	145	476	142	15	78	.298
2B	Jay Bell	129	428	106	13	46	.248
3B	Matt Williams	106	408	112	16	65	.275
SS	Tony Womack	125	481	128	3	30	.266
LF	Luis Gonzalez	162	609	198	57	142	.325
CF	Steve Finley	140	495	136	14	73	.275
RF	Reggie Sanders	126	441	116	33	90	.263

==== Other batters ====
Note: G = Games played; AB = At bats; H = Hits; HR = Home runs; RBI = Runs batted in; Avg. = Batting average

Player	G	AB	H	HR	RBI	Avg.
Craig Counsell	141	458	126	4	38	.275
Danny Bautista	100	222	67	5	26	.302
David Dellucci	115	217	60	10	40	.276
Erubiel Durazo	92	175	47	12	38	.269
Junior Spivey	72	163	42	5	21	.258
Rod Barajas	51	106	17	3	9	.160
Greg Colbrunn	59	97	28	4	18	.289
Chad Moeller	25	56	13	1	2	.232
Mike DiFelice	12	21	1	0	1	.048
Midre Cummings	20	20	6	0	1	.300
Alex Cintrón	8	7	2	0	0	.286
Jason Conti	5	4	1	0	0	.250
Ryan Christenson	19	4	1	0	1	.250
Jack Cust	3	2	1	0	0	.500
Lyle Overbay	2	2	1	0	0	.500
Juan Sosa	2	1	0	0	0	.000
Rob Ryan	1	1	0	0	0	.000
Ken Huckaby	1	1	0	0	0	.000

=== Starting pitchers ===
Note: G = Games pitched; IP = Innings pitched; W = Wins; L = Losses; ERA = Earned run average; SO = Strikeouts

Player	G	IP	W	L	ERA	SO
Curt Schilling	35	256.2	22	6	2.98	293
Randy Johnson	35	249.2	21	6	2.49	372
Brian Anderson	29	133.1	4	9	5.20	55
Robert Ellis	19	92.0	6	5	5.77	41
Albie Lopez	13	81.0	4	7	4.00	69
Armando Reynoso	9	46.2	1	6	5.98	15
Nick Bierbrodt	5	23.0	2	2	8.22	17

==== Other pitchers ====
Note: G = Games pitched; IP = Innings pitched; W = Wins; L = Losses; ERA = Earned run average; SO = Strikeouts

Player	G	IP	W	L	ERA	SO
Miguel Batista	48	139.1	11	8	3.36	90
Bobby Witt	14	43.1	4	1	4.78	31
Eric Knott	3	4.2	0	1	1.93	4

===== Relief pitchers =====
Note: G = Games pitched; IP = Innings pitched; W = Wins; L = Losses; SV = Saves; ERA = Earned run average; SO = Strikeouts

Player	G	IP	W	L	SV	ERA	SO
Byung-hyun Kim	78	98.0	5	6	19	2.94	113
Greg Swindell	64	53.2	2	6	2	4.53	42
Troy Brohawn	59	49.1	2	3	1	4.93	30
Bret Prinz	46	41.0	4	1	9	2.63	27
Erik Sabel	42	51.1	3	2	0	4.38	25
Mike Morgan	31	38.0	1	0	0	4.26	24
Russ Springer	18	17.2	0	0	1	7.13	12
Mike Mohler	13	13.2	0	0	0	7.24	7
Mike Koplove	9	10.0	0	1	0	3.60	14
Matt Mantei	8	7.0	0	0	2	2.57	12
Geraldo Guzmán	4	9.1	0	0	0	2.89	4
Steve Finley	1	1.0	0	0	0	0.00	0

== Postseason ==
=== NLDS ===
Arizona wins the series, 3–2

Game	Home	Score	Visitor	Score	Date	Series
1	Arizona	1	St. Louis	0	October	1-0 (AZ)
2	Arizona	1	St. Louis	4	October 10	1-1
3	St. Louis	3	Arizona	5	October 12	2-1 (AZ)
4	St. Louis	4	Arizona	1	October 13	2-2
5	Arizona	2	St. Louis	1	October 14	3-2 (AZ)

=== NLCS ===
Game	Date	Visitor	Score	Home	Score	Record (ATL-ARI)	Attendance
1	October 16	Atlanta	0	Arizona	2	0-1	37,729
2	October 17	Atlanta	8	Arizona	1	1-1	49,334
3	October 19	Arizona	5	Atlanta	1	1-2	41,624
4	October 20	Arizona	11	Atlanta	4	1-3	42,291
5	October 21	Arizona	3	Atlanta	2	1-4	35,652
Arizona wins series 4–1 and advances to the World Series

=== Game 1 ===
October 27, 2001 at Bank One Ballpark in Phoenix, Arizona

Team	1	2	3	4	5	6	7	8	9	R	H	E
New York	1	0	0	0	0	0	0	0	0	1	3	2
Arizona	1	0	4	4	0	0	0	0	x	9	10	0
WP: Curt Schilling (1-0) LP: Mike Mussina (0-1); Home runs: NYY: None; ARI: Craig Counsell (1), Luis Gonzalez (1)

=== Game 2 ===
October 28, 2001 at Bank One Ballpark in Phoenix, Arizona

Team	1	2	3	4	5	6	7	8	9	R	H	E
New York	0	0	0	0	0	0	0	0	0	0	3	0
Arizona	0	1	0	0	0	0	3	0	x	4	5	0
WP: Randy Johnson (1-0) LP: Andy Pettitte (0-1); Home runs: NYY: None; ARI: Matt Williams (1)

=== Game 3 ===
October 30, 2001 at Yankee Stadium in New York

Team	1	2	3	4	5	6	7	8	9	R	H	E
Arizona	0	0	0	1	0	0	0	0	0	1	3	3
New York	0	1	0	0	0	1	0	0	x	2	7	1
WP: Roger Clemens (1-0) LP: Brian Anderson (0-1) Sv: Mariano Rivera (1); Home runs: ARI: None; NYY: Jorge Posada (1)

=== Game 4 ===
October 31, 2001 at Yankee Stadium in New York City

Team	1	2	3	4	5	6	7	8	9	10	R	H	E
Arizona	0	0	0	1	0	0	0	2	0	0	3	6	0
New York	0	0	1	0	0	0	0	0	2	1	4	7	0
WP: Mariano Rivera (1-0) LP: Byung-hyun Kim (0-1); Home runs: ARI: Mark Grace (1); NYY: Shane Spencer (1), Tino Martinez (1), Derek Jeter (1)

=== Game 5 ===
November 1, 2001 at Yankee Stadium in New York

Team	1	2	3	4	5	6	7	8	9	10	11	12	R	H	E
Arizona	0	0	0	0	2	0	0	0	0	0	0	0	2	8	0
New York	0	0	0	0	0	0	0	0	2	0	0	1	3	9	1
WP: Sterling Hitchcock (1-0) LP: Albie Lopez (0-1); Home runs: ARI: Steve Finley (1), Rod Barajas (1); NYY: Scott Brosius (1)

=== Game 6 ===
November 3, 2001 at Bank One Ballpark in Phoenix, Arizona

Team	1	2	3	4	5	6	7	8	9	R	H	E
New York	0	0	0	0	0	2	0	0	0	2	7	1
Arizona	1	3	8	3	0	0	0	0	x	15	22	0
WP: Randy Johnson (2-0) LP: Andy Pettitte (0-2)

=== Game 7 ===
November 4, 2001 at Bank One Ballpark in Phoenix, Arizona

Team	1	2	3	4	5	6	7	8	9	R	H	E
New York	0	0	0	0	0	0	1	1	0	2	6	3
Arizona	0	0	0	0	0	1	0	0	2	3	11	0
WP: Randy Johnson (3-0) LP: Mariano Rivera (1-1); Home runs: NYY: Alfonso Soriano (1); ARI: None

=== Game log ===
Legend
Diamondbacks Win	Diamondbacks Loss	Game postponed

2001 Post Season Game Log
National League Division Series vs. St. Louis – Arizona wins series 3–2

#	Date	Opponent	Score	Win	Loss	Save	Stadium	Attendance	Series	Report
1	October 9	Cardinals	1–0	Schilling (1–0)	Morris (0–1)		Bank One Ballpark	42,251	1–0	NLDS 1
2	October 10	Cardinals	1–4	Williams (1–0)	Johnson (0–1)	Kline (1)	Bank One Ballpark	41,793	1–1	NLDS 2
3	October 12	@ Cardinals	5–3	Batista (1–0)	Matthews (0–1)	Kim (1)	Busch Memorial Stadium	52,273	2–1	NLDS 3
4	October 13	@ Cardinals	1–4	Smith (1–0)	Lopez (0–1)	Kline (2)	Busch Memorial Stadium	52,194	2–2	NLDS 4
5	October 14	Cardinals	2–1	Schilling (2–0)	Kline (0–1)		Bank One Ballpark	42,810	3–2	NLDS 5

National League Championship Series vs. Atlanta – Arizona wins series 4–1

#	Date	Opponent	Score	Win	Loss	Save	Stadium	Attendance	Series	Report
1	October 16	Braves	2–0	Johnson (1–0)			Bank One Ballpark	37,729	1–0	NLCS 1
2	October 17	Braves	1–8		Batista (0–1)		Bank One Ballpark	49,334	1–1	NLCS 2
3	October 19	@ Braves	5–1	Schilling (1–0)			Turner Field	41,624	2–1	NLCS 3
4	October 20	@ Braves	11–4	Anderson (1–0)		Kim (1)	Turner Field	42,291	3–1	NLCS 4
5	October 21	@ Braves	3–2	Johnson (2–0)		Kim (2)	Turner Field	35,652	4–1	NLCS 5

World Series vs. New York (AL) – Arizona wins series 4–3

#	Date	Opponent	Score	Win	Loss	Save	Stadium	Attendance	Series	Report
1	October 27	Yankees	9–1	Schilling (1–0)	Mussina (0–1)		Bank One Ballpark	49,646	1–0	WS 1
2	October 28	Yankees	4–0	Johnson (1–0)	Pettitte (0–1)		Bank One Ballpark	49,646	2–0	WS 2
3	October 30	@ Yankees	1–2	Clemens (1–0)	Anderson (0–1)	Rivera (1)	Yankee Stadium	55,820	2–1	WS 3
4	October 31	@ Yankees	3–4 (10 inn.)	Rivera (1–0)	Kim (0–1)		Yankee Stadium	55,863	2–2	WS 4
5	November 1	@ Yankees	2–3 (12 inn.)	Hitchcock (1–0)	Lopez (0–1)		Yankee Stadium	56,018	2–3	WS 5
6	November 3	Yankees	15–2	Johnson (2–0)	Pettitte (0–2)		Bank One Ballpark	49,707	3–3	WS 6
7	November 4	Yankees	3–2	Johnson (3–0)	Rivera (1–1)		Bank One Ballpark	49,589	4–3	WS 7

Notes:

^{a} All times in Mountain Standard Time.

==== Game times ====
#	Date	Opponent	Time	Network TV	Local Radio	Network Radio
1 NLDS	October 9	Cardinals	5:15 PM MST	Fox Family	KTAR-AM	ESPN Radio
2 NLDS	October 10	Cardinals	1:20 PM MST	Fox Family	KTAR-AM	ESPN Radio
3 NLDS	October 12	@ Cardinals	5:15 PM MST	Fox Family	KTAR-AM	ESPN Radio
4 NLDS	October 13	@ Cardinals	10:15 AM MST	Fox Family	KTAR-AM	ESPN Radio
5 NLDS	October 14	Cardinals	4:50 PM MST	Fox	KTAR-AM	ESPN Radio
1 NLCS	October 16	Braves	5:20 PM MST	Fox	KTAR-AM	ESPN Radio
2 NLCS	October 17	Braves	5:20 PM MST	Fox	KTAR-AM	ESPN Radio
3 NLCS	October 19	@ Braves	5:20 PM MST	Fox	KTAR-AM	ESPN Radio
4 NLCS	October 20	@ Braves	4:50 PM MST	Fox	KTAR-AM	ESPN Radio
5 NLCS	October 21	@ Braves	4:50 PM MST	Fox	KTAR-AM	ESPN Radio
1 WS	October 27	Yankees	4:30 PM MST	Fox	KTAR-AM	ESPN Radio
2 WS	October 28	Yankees	5:30 PM MST	Fox	KTAR-AM	ESPN Radio
3 WS	October 30	@ Yankees	6:00 PM MST	Fox	KTAR-AM	ESPN Radio
4 WS	October 31	@ Yankees	6:00 PM MST	Fox	KTAR-AM	ESPN Radio
5 WS	November 1	@ Yankees	6:00 PM MST	Fox	KTAR-AM	ESPN Radio
6 WS	November 3	Yankees	5:30 PM MST	Fox	KTAR-AM	ESPN Radio
7 WS	November 4	Yankees	5:30 PM MST	Fox	KTAR-AM	ESPN Radio

===== Umpires =====
#	Date	Opponent	Home Plate	First Base	Second Base	Third Base	Left Field	Right Field
1 NLDS	October 9	St. Louis	Randy Marsh	John Hirschbeck	Larry Young	Tim Tschida	Dale Scott	Alfonso Márquez
2 NLDS	October 10	St. Louis	John Hirschbeck	Larry Young	Tim Tschida	Dale Scott	Alfonso Márquez	Randy Marsh
3 NLDS	October 12	@ St. Louis	Mike Winters	Brian Gorman	Jim Joyce	Mike Everitt	Bruce Froemming	Chuck Meriwether
4 NLDS	October 13	@ St. Louis	Brian Gorman	Jim Joyce	Mike Everitt	Bruce Froemming	Chuck Meriwether	Mike Winters
5 NLDS	October 14	St. Louis	Jim Joyce	Mike Everitt	Bruce Froemming	Chuck Meriwether	Mike Winters	Brian Gorman
1 NLCS	October 16	Atlanta	Jerry Crawford	Jeff Kellogg	Angel Hernandez	Mike Reilly	Gerry Davis	Tim McClelland
2 NLCS	October 17	Atlanta	Jeff Kellogg	Angel Hernandez	Mike Reilly	Gerry Davis	Tim McClelland	Jerry Crawford
3 NLCS	October 19	@ Atlanta	Angel Hernandez	Mike Reilly	Gerry Davis	Tim McClelland	Jerry Crawford	Jeff Kellogg
4 NLCS	October 20	@ Atlanta	Mike Reilly	Gerry Davis	Tim McClelland	Jerry Crawford	Jeff Kellogg	Angel Hernandez
5 NLCS	October 21	@ Atlanta	Gerry Davis	Tim McClelland	Jerry Crawford	Jeff Kellogg	Angel Hernandez	Mike Reilly
1 WS	October 27	New York (AL)	Steve Rippley	Mark Hirschbeck	Dale Scott	Ed Rapuano	Jim Joyce	Dana DeMuth
2 WS	October 28	New York (AL)	Mark Hirschbeck	Dale Scott	Ed Rapuano	Jim Joyce	Dana DeMuth	Steve Rippley
3 WS	October 30	@ New York (AL)	Dale Scott	Ed Rapuano	Jim Joyce	Dana DeMuth	Steve Rippley	Mark Hirschbeck
4 WS	October 31	@ New York (AL)	Ed Rapuano	Jim Joyce	Dana DeMuth	Steve Rippley	Mark Hirschbeck	Dale Scott
5 WS	November 1	@ New York (AL)	Jim Joyce	Dana DeMuth	Steve Rippley	Mark Hirschbeck	Dale Scott	Ed Rapuano
6 WS	November 3	New York (AL)	Dana DeMuth	Steve Rippley	Mark Hirschbeck	Dale Scott	Ed Rapuano	Jim Joyce
7 WS	November 4	New York (AL)	Steve Rippley	Mark Hirschbeck	Dale Scott	Ed Rapuano	Jim Joyce	Dana DeMuth

== Awards and honors ==
- Curt Schilling and Randy Johnson, Pitchers, Sports Illustrated Sportsman of the Year
- Curt Schilling and Randy Johnson, Pitchers, World Series Most Valuable Player
- Craig Counsell, National League Championship Series Most Valuable Player
- Luis Gonzalez, National League Silver Slugger Award
- Randy Johnson, National League Cy Young Award
- Curt Schilling, Hutch Award
- Curt Schilling, Pitcher, Roberto Clemente Award

2001 Major League Baseball All-Star Game

== League leaders ==
Luis Gonzalez

- #3 in NL in home runs (57)
- #3 in NL in RBI (142)
- #3 in NL in slugging percentage (.688)
- #4 in NL in runs scored (128)

Randy Johnson

- Led MLB in ERA (2.49)
- Led MLB in strikeouts (372)
- #3 in NL in wins (21)

Curt Schilling

- Led MLB in wins (22)
- Led NL in complete games (6)
- #2 in NL in ERA (2.98)
- #2 in NL in strikeouts (293)

== Media ==
=== Local TV ===
Channel	Play-by-play #1	Play-by-play #2	Color commentators
KTVK-TV	Thom Brennaman or Greg Schulte	Greg Schulte or Joe Garagiola	Rod Allen and Jim Traber

=== Local Cable TV ===
Cable Channel	Play-by-play #1	Play-by-play #2	Color commentators
Fox Sports Net Arizona	Thom Brennaman or Greg Schulte	Greg Schulte or Joe Garagiola	Rod Allen and Jim Traber

=== Local Radio ===
Flagship station	Play-by-play #1	Play-by-play #2	Color commentators
KTAR-AM	Thom Brennaman or Greg Schulte	Greg Schulte or Jeff Munn	Rod Allen and Jim Traber

- -Some 2001 Arizona Diamondbacks radio network games broadcast on alternate flagship station KKLT-FM because of broadcast conflict with the (Phoenix Suns) of the (NBA) and the (Arizona Cardinals) of the (NFL).

== Farm system ==
Level	Team	League	Manager
AAA	Tucson Sidewinders	Pacific Coast League	Tom Spencer
AA	El Paso Diablos	Texas League	Al Pedrique
A	Lancaster JetHawks	California League	Scott Coolbaugh
A	South Bend Silver Hawks	Midwest League	Steve Scarsone
A-Short Season	Yakima Bears	Northwest League	Greg Lonigro
Rookie	Missoula Osprey	Pioneer League	Chip Hale
