= Lethbridge Black Diamonds =

- 1992–1998; Lethbridge, Alberta

Minor league affiliations
- Class: Rookie Advanced
- League: Pioneer League
- Division: North Division

Major league affiliations
- Team: Arizona Diamondbacks (1996–1998)

Minor league titles
- League titles: none

Team data
- Name: Lethbridge Black Diamonds (1996–1998); Lethbridge Mounties (1992–1995)
- Ballpark: Henderson Stadium

The Lethbridge Black Diamonds were a minor league baseball team located in Lethbridge, Alberta, Canada. The team was previously known as the Lethbridge Mounties from 1992–1995 before becoming the Lethbridge Black Diamonds from 1996–1998. They were one of the first two farm clubs of the Arizona Diamondbacks. Only 16 months after Arizona was granted a major league baseball franchise, the first farm club — the Lethbridge Black Diamonds — took the field. The team started playing two years before their parent club even played a game. The team played their first game in June 1996, whereas the Arizona Diamondbacks started playing in April 1998. The team played in the Pioneer League, which is a rookie league, with a shortened season, in Minor League Baseball. Their home stadium was Henderson Stadium. In 1999, the team was moved and became the Missoula Osprey.

== Team history ==
Within their first year, in 1996, the Lethbridge Black Diamonds had the best record going 50-22 before falling in the opening round of the playoffs. With manager Chris Speier, they led the league in defence/pitching, with 339 runs allowed which was 102 less than the number two place, and in offense, with 637 runs, which was 94 more than the next team in the league. The team drew in 49,124 fans that year. There were many All-Star players on the team the first year.

The second season manager Tommy Jones led the team to a 39-33 record, which tied them for third in the league with the Idaho Falls Braves, but the Black Diamonds fell within the first round of the playoffs. During 1997, no player on the team made the All-Star team or lead the Pioneer League in any key stat.

The last season the Black Diamonds were in Lethbridge they went 43-32 with manage Joe Almaraz. The team defeated Great Falls Dodgers 2 games to 1, then lost in the finals to Idaho Falls Braves.

== Notable alumni ==
- Rod Barajas (1996)
- Alex Cintron (1997-1998)
- Jack Cust (1998)
- Chris Speier (1996) 3 x MLB All-Star
- Junior Spivey (1996) MLB All-Star

=== 1996 ===
- Kevin Sweeney – league MVP – who also led the Pioneer League in average, slugging, OBP, runs and walks which was 94 more than the next team in the league.
- Vladimir Núñez – led the circuit in ERA by a full point and was voted top prospect in the league
- Nick Bierbrodt – rated #3 prospect in the league
- Larry Rodriguez – voted #4 prospect within the league

=== 1997 ===
- Jamie Puorto – was third in ERA
- Jhensy Sandoval – named top prospect of the season

== Players who played in the Major Leagues ==
- Jason Conti – Arizona Diamondbacks, Tampa Bay Rays, Milwaukee Brewers, Texas Rangers
- Rob Ryan (baseball) – Arizona Diamondback, Oakland Athletics
- Rod Barajas – Arizona Diamondbacks, Texas Rangers, Philadelphia Phillies, Toronto Blue Jays, New York Mets, Los Angeles Dodgers
- José Antonio Núñez – Los Angeles Dodgers, San Diego Padres
- Junior Spivey – Arizona Diamondbacks, Milwaukee Brewers
- Vladimir Núñez – Arizona Diamondbacks, Florida Marlins, Colorado Rockies, Atlanta Braves
- Erik Sabel – Arizona Diamondbacks, Detroit Tigers
- Nick Bierbrodt – Arizona Diamondbacks, Tampa Bay Rays, Cleveland Indians, Texas Rangers
- Ron Calloway – Montreal Expos
- Alex Cintrón – Arizona Diamondbacks, Chicago White Sox, Washington Nationals
- Eric Knott – Arizona Diamondbacks, Montreal Expos
- Abraham Núñez (outfielder) – Florida Marlins, Kansas City Royals
- Jack Cust – Arizona Diamondbacks, Colorado Rockies, Baltimore Orioles, San Diego Padres, Oakland Athletics, Seattle Mariners
- Robby Hammock – Arizona Diamondbacks
- Mike Koplove – Arizona Diamondbacks, Cleveland Indians
- Bret Prinz – Arizona Diamondbacks, New York Yankees, Los Angeles Angels, Chicago White Sox

== See also ==
- List of defunct baseball teams in Canada
