= 2003 Arizona Diamondbacks season =

2003 Arizona Diamondbacks
- League: National League
- Division: West
- Ballpark: BankOne Ballpark
- City: Phoenix, Arizona
- Record: 84–78 (.519)
- Divisional place: 3rd
- Owners: Ken Kendrick; Jerry Colangelo
- General managers: Joe Garagiola Jr.
- Managers: Bob Brenly
- Television: FSN Arizona; KTVK (3TV) (Thom Brennaman, Steve Lyons, Greg Schulte, Jim Traber, Joe Garagiola)
- Radio: KTAR (620 AM) (Greg Schulte, Jeff Munn, Victor Rojas)
- Stats: ESPN.com; Baseball Reference

The 2003 Arizona Diamondbacks season was the franchise's 6th season in Major League Baseball and their 6th season at Bank One Ballpark in Phoenix, Arizona, as members of the National League West. They looked to improve on their 98–64 record from 2002. They looked to contend in what was once again a strong National League West. They finished the season with a record of 84–78, good enough for third place in the division.

== Offseason ==
- December 15, 2002: Erubiel Durazo was traded by the Diamondbacks to the Oakland Athletics as part of a 4-team trade. The Cincinnati Reds sent Elmer Dessens and cash to the Diamondbacks. The Toronto Blue Jays sent Felipe López to the Reds. The Athletics sent a player to be named later to the Blue Jays. The Athletics completed the deal by sending Jason Arnold (minors) to the Blue Jays on December 16.
- January 30, 2003: Ricky Bottalico was signed as a free agent by the Diamondbacks.
- February 14, 2003: Scott Service was signed as a free agent by the Diamondbacks.

== Regular season ==
- September 19, 2003: Diamondbacks pitcher Randy Johnson hit a home run off of Milwaukee Brewers pitcher Doug Davis, his only home run in his MLB career.

=== Season standings ===
==== National League West ====
NL West
Team	W	L	Pct.	GB	Home	Road
San Francisco Giants	100	61	.621	—	57‍–‍24	43‍–‍37
Los Angeles Dodgers	85	77	.525	15½	46‍–‍35	39‍–‍42
Arizona Diamondbacks	84	78	.519	16½	45‍–‍36	39‍–‍42
Colorado Rockies	74	88	.457	26½	49‍–‍32	25‍–‍56
San Diego Padres	64	98	.395	36½	35‍–‍46	29‍–‍52

==== Record vs. opponents ====
2003 National League record Source: MLB Standings Grid – 2003
Team	AZ	ATL	CHC	CIN	COL	FLA	HOU	LAD	MIL	MON	NYM	PHI	PIT	SD	SF	STL	AL
Arizona	—	2–5	2–4	7–2	10–9	2–5	5–1	10–9	3–3	4–2	4–2	4–2	3–3	9–10	5–14	3–3	11–4
Atlanta	5–2	—	4–2	3–3	6–0	9–10	5–1	4–2	4–2	12–7	11–8	9–10	7–2	6–1	2–4	4–2	10–5
Chicago	4–2	2–4	—	10–7	3–3	4–2	9–7	2–4	10–6	3–3	5–1	1–5	10–8	4–2	4–2	8–9	9–9
Cincinnati	2–7	3–3	7–10	—	4–2	2–4	5–12	2–4	8–10	2–4	2–4	5–4	5–11	3–3	3–3	9–7	7–5
Colorado	9–10	0–6	3–3	2–4	—	4–2	2–4	7–12	5–1	3–4	2–5	2–4	3–6	12–7	7–12	4–2	9–6
Florida	5–2	10–9	2–4	4–2	2–4	—	1–5	2–5	7–2	13–6	12–7	13–6	2–4	5–1	1–5	3–3	9–6
Houston	1–5	1–5	7–9	12–5	4–2	5–1	—	4–2	9–8	3–3	2–4	2–4	10–6	3–3	2–4	11–7	11–7
Los Angeles	9–10	2–4	4–2	4–2	12–7	5–2	2–4	—	4–2	4–2	3–3	2–5	5–1	8–11	6–13	4–2	11–7
Milwaukee	3–3	2–4	6–10	10–8	1–5	2–7	8–9	2–4	—	0–6	6–3	4–2	10–7	5–1	1–5	3–13	5–7
Montreal	2–4	7–12	3–3	4–2	4–3	6–13	3–3	2–4	6–0	—	14–5	8–11	3–3	4–2	7–0	1–5	9–9
New York	2–4	8–11	1–5	4–2	5–2	7–12	4–2	3–3	3–6	5–14	—	7–12	4–2	3–3	4–2	1–5	5–10
Philadelphia	2–4	10–9	5–1	4–5	4–2	6–13	4–2	5–2	2–4	11–8	12–7	—	2–4	4–3	3–3	4–2	8–7
Pittsburgh	3–3	2–7	8–10	11–5	6–3	4–2	6–10	1–5	7–10	3–3	2–4	4–2	—	4–2	2–4	7–10	5–7
San Diego	10–9	1–6	2–4	3–3	7–12	1–5	3–3	11–8	1–5	2–4	3–3	3–4	2–4	—	5–14	2–4	8–10
San Francisco	14–5	4–2	2–4	3–3	12–7	5–1	4–2	13–6	5–1	0–7	2–4	3–3	4–2	14–5	—	5–1	10–8
St. Louis	3–3	2–4	9–8	7–9	2–4	3–3	7–11	2–4	13–3	5–1	5–1	2–4	10–7	4–2	1–5	—	10–8

=== Notable transactions ===
- June 3, 2003: 2003 Major League Baseball draft
  - Conor Jackson was drafted by the Diamondbacks in the 1st round (19th pick). Player signed June 16, 2003.
  - Carlos Quentin was drafted by the Diamondbacks in the 1st round (29th pick). Player signed July 2, 2003.
- June 16, 2003: Scott Service was selected off waivers from the Diamondbacks by the Toronto Blue Jays.
- June 29, 2003: Matt Williams was released by the Diamondbacks.
- July 29, 2003: David Dellucci, Bret Prinz, and John Prowl (minors) were traded by the Diamondbacks to the New York Yankees for Raúl Mondesí and cash.

=== Roster ===
2003 Arizona Diamondbacks
Roster
Pitchers: 43,25 Miguel Batista; 26 Ricky Bottalico; 57 Chris Capuano; 45 Elmer Dessens; 49 Édgar González; 52 Andrew Good; 51 Randy Johnson; 49 Byung-hyun Kim; 58 Mike Koplove; 31 Matt Mantei; 35 Mike Myers; 54 Eddie Oropesa; 24 John Patterson; 41 Bret Prinz; 36 Brady Raggio; 34 Stephen Randolph; 40 Dennys Reyes; 38 Curt Schilling; 36 Scott Service; 47 José Valverde; 56 Óscar Villarreal; 55 Brandon Webb	Catchers: 48 Rod Barajas; 7 Robby Hammock; 16 Chad Moeller; Infielders: 3 Carlos Baerga; 10 Alex Cintrón; 4 Craig Counsell; 17 Mark Grace; 28 Shea Hillenbrand; 23 Lyle Overbay; 37 Junior Spivey; 9 Matt Williams; 5 Tony Womack	Outfielders: 29 Danny Bautista; 25 David Dellucci; 12 Steve Finley; 20 Luis Gonzalez; 6 Quinton McCracken; 43 Raúl Mondesí; 27 Luis Terrero; Other batters: 8 Félix José	Manager: 15 Bob Brenly; Coaches: 13 Mark Davis (bullpen); 50 Chuck Kniffin (pitching); 21 Dwayne Murphy (hitting); 14 Eddie Rodríguez (third base); 53 Glenn Sherlock (bench); 19 Robin Yount (first base)

== Player stats ==
=== Batting ===
==== Starters by position ====
Note: Pos = Position; G = Games played; AB = At bats; H = Hits; Avg. = Batting average; HR = Home runs; RBI = Runs batted in

Pos	Player	G	AB	H	Avg.	HR	RBI
C	Chad Moeller	78	239	64	.268	7	29
1B	Lyle Overbay	86	254	70	.276	4	28
2B	Junior Spivey	106	365	93	.255	13	50
SS	Alex Cintrón	117	448	142	.317	13	51
3B	Craig Counsell	89	303	71	.234	3	21
LF	Luis Gonzalez	156	579	176	.304	26	104
CF	Steve Finley	147	516	148	.287	22	70
RF	Danny Bautista	88	284	78	.275	4	36

==== Other batters ====
Note: G = Games played; AB = At bats; H = Hits; Avg. = Batting average; HR = Home runs; RBI = Runs batted in

Player	G	AB	H	Avg.	HR	RBI
Shea Hillenbrand	85	330	88	.267	17	59
Matt Kata	78	288	74	.257	7	29
Rod Barajas	80	220	48	.218	3	28
Tony Womack	61	219	52	.237	2	15
Carlos Baerga	105	207	71	.343	4	39
Quinton McCracken	115	203	46	.227	0	18
Robby Hammock	65	195	55	.282	8	28
David Dellucci	70	165	40	.242	2	19
Raúl Mondesí	45	162	49	.302	8	22
Mark Grace	66	135	27	.200	3	16
Matt Williams	44	134	33	.246	4	16
Félix José	18	18	6	.333	1	6
Luis Terrero	5	4	1	.250	0	0

=== Pitching ===
==== Starting pitchers ====
Note: G = Games pitched; IP = Innings pitched; W = Wins; L = Losses; ERA = Earned run average; SO = Strikeouts

Player	G	IP	W	L	ERA	SO
Miguel Batista	36	193.1	10	9	3.54	142
Brandon Webb	29	180.2	10	9	2.84	172
Elmer Dessens	34	175.2	8	8	5.07	113
Curt Schilling	24	168.0	8	9	2.95	194
Randy Johnson	18	114.0	6	8	4.26	125
Byung-Hyun Kim	7	43.0	1	5	3.56	33

==== Other pitchers ====
Note: G = Games pitched; IP = Innings pitched; W = Wins; L = Losses; ERA = Earned run average; SO = Strikeouts

Player	G	IP	W	L	ERA	SO
Andrew Good	16	66.1	4	2	5.29	42
John Patterson	16	55.0	1	4	6.05	43
Chris Capuano	9	33.0	2	4	4.64	23
Édgar González	9	18.1	2	1	4.91	14

==== Relief pitchers ====
Note: G = Games pitched; W = Wins; L = Losses; SV = Saves; ERA = Earned run average; SO = Strikeouts

Player	G	W	L	SV	ERA	SO
Matt Mantei	50	5	4	29	2.62	68
Óscar Villarreal	86	10	7	0	2.57	80
Mike Myers	64	0	1	0	5.70	21
José Valverde	54	2	1	10	2.15	71
Steve Randolph	50	8	1	0	4.05	50
Eddie Oropesa	47	3	3	0	5.82	39
Mike Koplove	31	3	0	0	2.15	27
Scott Service	18	0	2	1	4.91	18
Brady Raggio	10	0	0	1	6.48	8
Dennys Reyes	3	0	0	0	11.57	5
Ricky Bottalico	2	1	0	0	5.40	2
Bret Prinz	1	0	0	0	0.00	1

== Farm system ==
Level	Team	League	Manager
AAA	Tucson Sidewinders	Pacific Coast League	Al Pedrique
AA	El Paso Diablos	Texas League	Scott Coolbaugh
A	Lancaster JetHawks	California League	Mike Aldrete
A	South Bend Silver Hawks	Midwest League	Von Hayes
A-Short Season	Yakima Bears	Northwest League	Bill Plummer
Rookie	Missoula Osprey	Pioneer League	Tony Perezchica
