= Phillip Wellman =

American baseball coach (born 1961)

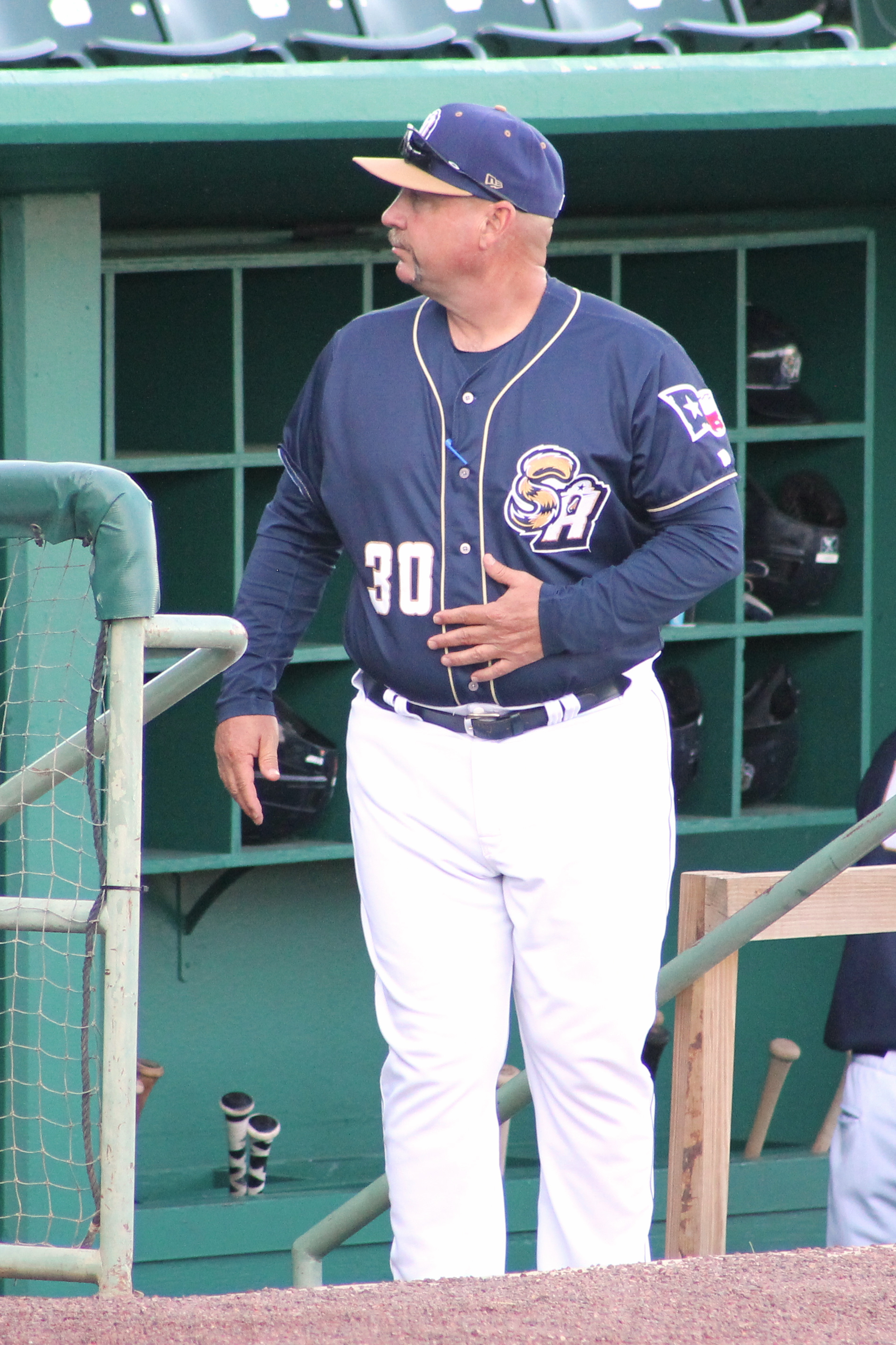
- Wellman managing the San Antonio Missions in 2016
- Outfielder / Coach / Manager
- Born: December 5, 1961 (age 64); Marlin, Texas, U.S.
- Bats: Switch Throws: Right

MiLB statistics
- Batting average: .250
- Home runs: 36
- Runs batted in: 161
- Coaching win–loss record: 862–939
- Winning %: .479
- Stats at Baseball Reference

Teams
- As player: Anderson Braves (1984); Sumter Braves (1985); Durham Bulls (1986); Kenosha Twins (1986); Harrisburg Senators (1987); As manager: GCL Orioles (1992); Lethbridge Mounties (1993–1994); River City Rumblers (1995); Winston-Salem Warthogs (1996); Burlington Bees (1997–1998); Chattanooga Lookouts (1999, 2001–2003); Mississippi Braves (2007–2010); Arkansas Travelers (2014); San Antonio Missions (2016–2018); Amarillo Sod Poodles (2019–2020); San Antonio Missions (2021–2022); El Paso Chihuahuas (2023)

Phillip Lane Wellman (born December 5, 1961, in Marlin, Texas), is an American professional baseball coach and manager. He is the current bench coach for the Greensboro Grasshoppers, High-A affiliate of the Pittsburgh Pirates of Major League Baseball. Wellman entered minor league baseball as a player in 1984 and began coaching in 1988. Wellman attended Sam Houston State University and Southwestern University.

== Managerial career ==
Wellman began his coaching career with the 1988 Pulaski Braves. He was a coach in the Atlanta Braves system from 1988 to 1991, including 1990 with the Burlington Braves and 1991 with the Durham Bulls.

Wellman managed outside of the Braves organization from 1992 to 2003, with the exception of 2000, when he was a coach for the minor league Louisville RiverBats. He returned to the Braves as the hitting coach for the Greenville Braves in 2004-2005, and the Mississippi Braves in 2006. Wellman was the skipper of Mississippi from 2007 to 2010.

After the Mississippi Braves finished the 2010 season with a 63–74 record, Wellman's contract was not renewed. He joined the Springfield Cardinals of the Texas League, Double-A affiliate of the St. Louis Cardinals, as hitting coach, and served three years (2011–2013) in that post before his appointment as manager of the Travelers, who also play in the Texas League. He left the Travelers at the end of the season and worked for a trucking company in Chattanooga, Tennessee. Wellman returned to minor league baseball in 2016 as manager of the San Antonio Missions.

In 2026, Wellman was named bench coach for the Greensboro Grasshoppers the High-A affiliate of the Pittsburgh Pirates.

=== Umpire altercation and tirade ===
On June 1, 2007, Wellman gained international attention when he went on a tirade against the umpires during a game against the Chattanooga Lookouts at AT&T Field. He protested the umpire's decision to throw his pitcher out of the game for using a foreign substance by covering home plate with dirt, then tracing in the dirt a new, significantly larger home plate. He then went on to uproot bases and throw them, crawl in a prone position across the infield like a soldier, and pretend to bite and hurl the rosin bag at an umpire as if it were a hand grenade. He concluded his tirade by pretending to eject the umpires themselves with a fist-pump and then blowing a farewell kiss to the crowd while taking a bow. The episode was broadcast on sports shows across the United States and gained him widespread fame on the Internet. This incident occurred one day before Lou Piniella's infamous meltdown against the Atlanta Braves. Wellman was given a three-game suspension effective June 4, 2007. The Braves reappointed Wellman manager of the Mississippi Braves on December 7, 2007.

In March 2009, ESPN showed the top-10 meltdowns in sports history and judged Wellman's to be #1. Upon showing the clip, Hannah Storm said, "and there he goes, never to be seen from again." Co-anchor Josh Elliott added, "end of his career." However, this was incorrect. He was still the manager; and on September 13, 2008, he led the Mississippi Braves to the Southern League championship beating the Carolina Mudcats 3-2 in the 10th inning of the decisive Game 5. He was also brought up to the major league Atlanta Braves team for a couple of weeks in September 2008, a tradition for top minor-league managers in the Braves organization.

On May 26, 2016, in a game against the Northwest Arkansas Naturals, he was ejected after protesting a runner being called out. Before being ejected, he stood in what appeared to be a military parade rest position, then threw the rosin bag as a grenade. Upon being ejected by the umpire, he first kicked the second base, then pulled the base from the ground and walked away with it. He then tossed the base in front of the San Antonio Missions dugout before walking off the field.

== Personal life ==
Wellman is married to Montee, with whom he has a daughter, Britnee, and son, Brett.

Brett attended Auburn University at Montgomery and played in the Toronto Blue Jays minor league system from 2014 to 2016, then later coached for the Chattanooga Lookouts, and a youth baseball team in Dallas. After the 2020 Minor League Baseball season was cancelled due to the COVID-19 pandemic, Brett managed the Amarillo Sod Squad, a Texas Collegiate League team that used the home ballpark of the Amarillo Sod Poodles, the team Phillip had managed the previous season.

== Managerial records ==
Year	Team	League	Record	Finish	Organization	Playoffs
1992	GCL Orioles	Gulf Coast League	29-29	9th	Baltimore Orioles	
1993	Lethbridge Mounties	Pioneer League	29-44	7th	Co-op	
1994	Lethbridge Mounties	Pioneer League	29-43	7th	Co-op	
1995	River City Rumblers	Appalachian League	22-45	10th	Co-op	
1996	Winston-Salem Warthogs	Carolina League	74-65	3rd	Cincinnati Reds	
1997	Burlington (IA) Bees	Midwest League	72-68	3rd	Cincinnati Reds	Lost in 1st round
1998	Burlington (IA) Bees	Midwest League	63-77	13th	Cincinnati Reds	
1999	Chattanooga Lookouts	Southern League	78-62	2nd	Cincinnati Reds	Lost in 1st round
2001	Chattanooga Lookouts	Southern League	72-67	5th	Cincinnati Reds	Lost in 1st round
2002	Chattanooga Lookouts	Southern League	60-80	9th	Cincinnati Reds	
2003	Chattanooga Lookouts	Southern League	66-74	8th	Cincinnati Reds	
2007	Mississippi Braves	Southern League	67-72	6th	Atlanta Braves	Lost in 1st round
2008	Mississippi Braves	Southern League	73-66	3rd	Atlanta Braves	League Champs
2009	Mississippi Braves	Southern League	65-73	5th	Atlanta Braves	
2010	Mississippi Braves	Southern League	63-74	8th	Atlanta Braves	
2014	Arkansas Travelers	Texas League	75-65	3rd/1st	LA Angels	Lost in 1st round
2016	San Antonio Missions	Texas League	58-62	8th	San Diego Padres	
2017	San Antonio Missions	Texas League	78-62	1st	San Diego Padres	Lost in 1st round
2018	San Antonio Missions	Texas League	71-67	3rd	San Diego Padres	Lost League Finals
2019	Amarillo Sod Poodles	Texas League	72-66	1st	San Diego Padres	League Champs
2021	San Antonio Missions	Double-A Central	57–63	8th	San Diego Padres	
2022	San Antonio Missions	Texas League	68-68	5th	San Diego Padres	Lost in 1st round
2023	El Paso Chihuahuas	Pacific Coast League	62-88	9th	San Diego Padres	

== See also ==
- Bobby Cox
- Joe Mikulik
- Lou Piniella
