= Jason Conti =

American baseball player (1975–2025)

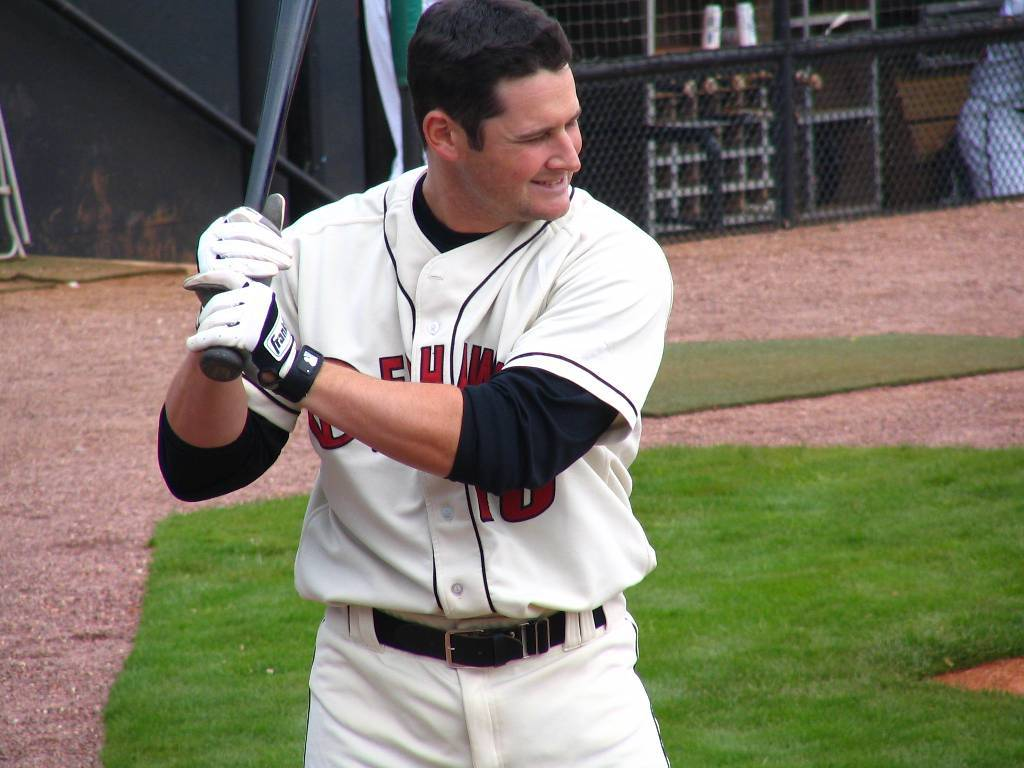
- Conti in 2005
- Outfielder
- Born: January 27, 1975; Pittsburgh, Pennsylvania, U.S.
- Died: May 17, 2025 (aged 50); Chandler, Arizona, U.S.
- Batted: Left Threw: Right

MLB debut
- June 29, 2000, for the Arizona Diamondbacks

Last MLB appearance
- July 18, 2004, for the Texas Rangers

MLB statistics
- Batting average: .238
- Home runs: 6
- Runs batted in: 47
- Stats at Baseball Reference

Former teams
- Arizona Diamondbacks (2000–2001); Tampa Bay Devil Rays (2002–2003); Milwaukee Brewers (2003–2004); Texas Rangers (2004)

Stanley Jason Conti (/ˈkɒntaɪ/ KON-ty; January 27, 1975 – May 17, 2025) was an American professional baseball outfielder who played five seasons in Major League Baseball (MLB), for the Arizona Diamondbacks, Tampa Bay Devil Rays, Milwaukee Brewers, and Texas Rangers.

== Career ==
Conti was drafted out of the University of Pittsburgh in the 32nd round of the 1996 amateur draft by the Arizona Diamondbacks. After five years in the Diamondbacks organization – including parts of two seasons at the Major League level – he was traded to the Tampa Bay Devil Rays along with pitcher Nick Bierbrodt for pitcher Albie Lopez and catcher Mike DiFelice. Prior to the start of the 2003 season, Conti was traded to the Milwaukee Brewers for catcher Javier Valentín. After the conclusion of the 2003 campaign, Conti signed as a free agent with the Texas Rangers and spent two years in the club's system, hitting .328 during one campaign with their Triple-A affiliate, the Oklahoma Redhawks. While with Texas, Conti grabbed attention by robbing Houston's Carlos Beltrán of an extra-base hit by climbing up the center field mound known as Tal's Hill, and making an over-the-shoulder catch at Houston's Minute Maid Park.

In total, Conti appeared in 182 games over the course of his five seasons in the big leagues. His best showing was in 2002, when he played 78 games for the Devil Rays, batting .257. Overall in his career, Conti hit 6 home runs and had 47 RBI.

In 2006, he batted .259, with 2 home runs and 6 RBI with the New York Yankees Triple-A affiliate, the Columbus Clippers. With the Memphis Redbirds, the Triple-A affiliate of the St. Louis Cardinals, he batted .267 with 1 home run and 7 RBI. At the conclusion of 2006, Conti was a member of the Independent League's Camden Riversharks.

Conti gained slight fame during his major league career by showing off an excellent defensive throwing arm from the outfield. Conti, as a member of the Arizona Diamondbacks, on consecutive nights threw out Atlanta's Brian Jordan at third base with throws from deep in right field. A few seasons later as a member of the Tampa Bay Devil Rays, Conti gunned down Chicago's Frank Thomas at home plate on consecutive nights.

For the 2007 season, Conti played in Italy for the Bologna Italieri of the Serie 1-A Championship League.

== Death ==
Conti died after suffering a brain injury on May 17, 2025, at the age of 50.
