= Mike DiFelice =

American baseball player (born 1969)

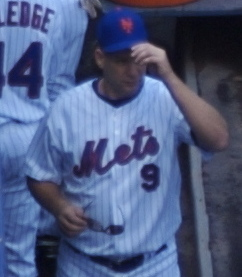
- DiFelice with the New York Mets in 2007
- Catcher
- Born: May 28, 1969 (age 56); Philadelphia, Pennsylvania, U.S.
- Batted: Right Threw: Right

MLB debut
- September 1, 1996, for the St. Louis Cardinals

Last MLB appearance
- April 18, 2008, for the Tampa Bay Rays

MLB statistics
- Batting average: .236
- Home runs: 28
- Runs batted in: 167
- Stats at Baseball Reference

Teams
- St. Louis Cardinals (1996–1997); Tampa Bay Devil Rays (1998–2001); Arizona Diamondbacks (2001); St. Louis Cardinals (2002); Kansas City Royals (2003); Detroit Tigers (2004); Chicago Cubs (2004); New York Mets (2005–2007); Tampa Bay Rays (2008)

Michael William DiFelice (/ˌdiːfɪˈliːs/; born May 28, 1969) is an American former Major League Baseball journeyman catcher. He is a graduate from the University of Tennessee, and was drafted by the St. Louis Cardinals in the 11th round of the 1991 Major League Baseball draft. He made his major league debut in 1996 with the Cards. On April 17, 1997, he recorded his first stolen base with a steal of home against pitcher Kevin Brown who threw a wild pitchout.

DiFelice was chosen by the Tampa Bay Devil Rays with the 20th selection of the 1997 MLB Expansion Draft. On July 25, 2001, he was traded with Albie Lopez to the Arizona Diamondbacks for Jason Conti and Nick Bierbrodt. His time in Arizona was short and tumultuous. In a game against the Pittsburgh Pirates on August 14, DiFelice got into a fight with Kevin Young at home plate. He was suspended for two games but appealed the suspension; Pirates' manager Lloyd McClendon said "That guy deliberately stood on Kevin and kneed him. There's absolutely no excuse for that." In 2002, he signed as a free agent to play with the St. Louis Cardinals. Later, he played for the Kansas City Royals, Detroit Tigers, was sent to the Chicago Cubs as part of a conditional deal, then signed with the Florida Marlins, New York Mets, Washington Nationals, and again with the Mets.

Over the first two seasons he spent with the Mets, (2005 and 2006), his batting averages were very bad, in 2005, he had a batting average of .118, (2–17), in 2006 he had only an .080 batting average, (2-25). However, in 2007, his final year with the Mets, his batting average improved to .250, (10–40). Even with that, the Mets still declined to offer salary arbitration to DiFelice.

On January 6, 2008, he signed a minor league deal with the Tampa Bay Rays. He saw his last action at the major league level in April of that season, appearing in seven games. At his request, he was released in early September and retired.

On February 5, 2009, DiFelice was named the manager of the Rookie-level Kingsport Mets in the New York Mets organization. DiFelice's at-bat song was 'You've Got Another Thing Comin' by Judas Priest, which was recommended by former teammate Paul Ellis. He and Dan Wheeler are the only Tampa Bay players to suit up in all three of the franchise's uniforms. An interesting fact about DiFelice is that he was included on the Rays' 40-man roster in the baseball video game MLB 09: The Show, even though he had retired in September 2008, and when the game was released, he was the manager of the Kingsport Mets.
