= Fritzie Connally =

American baseball player (born 1958)

- Third baseman
- Born: May 19, 1958 (age 67); Bryan, Texas, U.S.
- Batted: Right Threw: Right

MLB debut
- September 9, 1983, for the Chicago Cubs

Last MLB appearance
- July 2, 1985, for the Baltimore Orioles

MLB statistics
- Batting average: .221
- Home runs: 3
- Runs batted in: 15
- Stats at Baseball Reference

Teams
- Chicago Cubs (1983); Baltimore Orioles (1985)

Fritzie Lee Connally (born May 19, 1958) is an American former professional baseball player. A right-handed third baseman, he played parts of two seasons in Major League Baseball for the Baltimore Orioles and Chicago Cubs.

== Career ==
After a career at Baylor University, Connally was drafted by the Cubs in the 7th round of the 1980 June amateur entry draft. Connally played in the minors for four seasons, getting a late-season call-up to the Cubs in 1983. He made his debut with the Cubs on September 9 as a pinch hitter for Tom Grant. St. Louis Cardinals pitcher Neil Allen struck him out.

Connally had six more pinch-hit appearances that year, as well as one start at third base, but didn't get his first major league hit until his final at-bat of the year, October 2 against the Cardinals, when he was again called upon to pinch-hit for Grant. This time, Connally singled against Dave Rucker. He remained in the game to play third base in what would prove to be his last game as a Cub. On December 7, Connally was sent to the San Diego Padres as part of a three-team trade involving (among others) Craig Lefferts, Carmelo Martinez, and Scott Sanderson.

Connally spent 1984 with the Las Vegas Stars, the Padres' AAA affiliate, before being traded February 7, 1985, to the Orioles for Vic Rodriguez. He made Baltimore's Opening Day roster and made most of his appearances at third base, also seeing time at first base and designated hitter. Connally's first two major league home runs were notably grand slams. The first came off the Toronto Blue Jays' Doyle Alexander, and the second came at the expense of the Seattle Mariners' Matt Young. Though he was batting .280 in early June, Connally fell into a 3-for-31 slump, dropping his average to .232, before being sent down to AAA Rochester for the remainder of the campaign.

Connally retired after the 1985 season.

== Personal ==
Connally lives in Arlington, Texas.
