= Vic Rodriguez (baseball) =

American baseball player and coach (born 1961)

Houston Astros – No. 47
- Infielder / Coach
- Born: July 14, 1961 (age 65); New York City, U.S.
- Batted: Right Threw: Right

MLB debut
- September 5, 1984, for the Baltimore Orioles

Last MLB appearance
- July 30, 1989, for the Minnesota Twins

MLB statistics
- Batting average: .429
- Home runs: 0
- Runs batted in: 2
- Stats at Baseball Reference

Teams
- As player: Baltimore Orioles (1984); Minnesota Twins (1989); As coach: Boston Red Sox (2013–2017); Cleveland Indians / Guardians (2018–2023); San Diego Padres (2024–2025); Houston Astros (2026–present)

Victor Manuel Rodriguez Rivera (born July 14, 1961) is an American professional baseball coach and former infielder who currently serves as the hitting coach for the Houston Astros of Major League Baseball (MLB). He played in MLB for the Baltimore Orioles in 1984 and the Minnesota Twins in 1989, appearing in 17 games. He has previously held the assistant hitting coach role for the Boston Red Sox (2013–2017) and Cleveland Guardians (2018–2023), and the primary hitting coach role for the San Diego Padres (2024–2025).

Born in New York City, Rodriguez attended high school in Puerto Rico. He threw and batted right-handed and as an active player was listed as 5 feet 11 inches (1.80 m) tall and 173 pounds (78 kg). He played 1,759 games in the minor leagues, batting .295 with 102 home runs. In 13 seasons at Triple-A, he batted .290.

== Playing career ==
=== Orioles ===
Rodriguez was originally signed at the age of 15 as an amateur free agent by the Baltimore Orioles in 1977. He played mostly as a second baseman as he moved his way slowly up through the Orioles organization, not reaching the Triple-A level for even a partial season until 1982. After another full season at Double-A with the Charlotte O's in 1983, Rodriguez returned to Triple-A for good in 1984 with the Rochester Red Wings.

That was the season in which Rodriguez got his first chance at the majors. Called up in September when rosters expanded, Rodriguez appeared in 11 games for the Orioles, seven of them at second base, and went 7-for-17 for a batting average of .412. That would be the end of his career in the Orioles' organization, however, as he was traded to the San Diego Padres for fellow infielder Fritzie Connally.

=== Padres and Cardinals ===
Rodriguez lasted just one season in the Padres' system, playing for the Las Vegas Stars in 1985 and batting .312. He became a free agent after the season and signed with the St. Louis Cardinals, and spent the next two seasons with their top farm team, the Louisville Redbirds. By this time, Rodriguez had been shifted from second base to third base defensively.

=== Twins ===
After the 1987 season, he again became a free agent, signing with the Minnesota Twins during the offseason. He spent all of 1988 and 1989 with their Triple-A team, the Portland Beavers, before finally getting another chance in the majors. Called up in July to fill in for the injured Wally Backman, Rodriguez again posted impressive batting numbers, going 5-for-11 with 2 doubles for a .455 batting average and .636 slugging average. However, he was sent back to the minors in early August.

Rodriguez remained in the Twins system for two more seasons, continuing to play for the Beavers. In 1992, he moved on to the Philadelphia Phillies, playing two seasons for the Scranton/Wilkes-Barre Red Barons. In 1994, he played for the Edmonton Trappers in the Florida Marlins' system, then finished his career playing for the Boston Red Sox' top farm club, the Pawtucket Red Sox, in 1995.

After his playing career ended in 1995 with the Pawtucket Red Sox, Rodriguez remained in the Red Sox organization as a minor league coach and instructor for 17 seasons, including seven years (2002; 2007–2012) as roving minor league hitting coordinator and four (2003–2006) as Latin American field coordinator of instruction.

== Coaching career ==
=== Boston Red Sox ===
On November 30, 2012, the Boston Red Sox appointed Rodriguez as their assistant hitting coach. Following manager John Farrell's dismissal on October 11, 2017, Farrell's coaches were told they were free to seek employment elsewhere.

=== Cleveland Indians/Guardians ===
On November 8, 2017, Rodriguez succeeded Matt Quatraro as the Cleveland Indians' assistant hitting coach.

=== San Diego Padres ===
On December 22, 2023, Rodriguez was hired by the San Diego Padres to serve as the team's primary hitting coach.

=== Houston Astros ===
On November 5, 2025, the Houston Astros hired Rodriguez to serve as the team's new hitting coach, replacing Troy Snitker and Alex Cintrón.

Sporting positions
| Preceded by Alex Cintrón | Houston Astros hitting coach 2026–present | Succeeded by Incumbent |
