= Hirschbeck =

Hirschbeck is a surname. Notable people with the surname include:

- John Hirschbeck (born 1954), American baseball umpire
- Mark Hirschbeck (born 1960), American baseball umpire
