= Robert Ellis (baseball) =

American baseball player (born 1970)

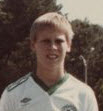
- Ellis in 1983
- Pitcher
- Born: December 15, 1970 (age 55); Baton Rouge, Louisiana, U.S.
- Batted: Right Threw: Right

MLB debut
- September 12, 1996, for the California Angels

Last MLB appearance
- August 16, 2003, for the Texas Rangers

MLB statistics
- Win–loss record: 7–7
- Earned run average: 6.03
- Strikeouts: 54
- Stats at Baseball Reference

Teams
- California Angels (1996); Arizona Diamondbacks (2001); Los Angeles Dodgers (2002); Texas Rangers (2003)

Robert Randolph Ellis (born December 15, 1970) is an American former starting pitcher who played in Major League Baseball between 1996 and 2003. He batted and threw right-handed.

== Career ==
Listed at 6' 5", 220 lb., Ellis was selected by the Chicago White Sox in the 1990 Major League Baseball draft out of the Northwestern State University of Louisiana. From 1991–1996, he pitched at five different minor league levels. Ellis began his pro baseball career in the minors with the New York–Penn League's Utica Blue Sox in 1991. Ellis spent the next season playing for both the Gulf Coast League White Sox and the Single-A South Bend White Sox of the Mid West League in 1992. In 1993, Ellis once again played for two different teams playing for the Single-A Sarasota White Sox of the Florida State League. And later for the Double-A Birmingham Barons of the Southern League. On July 27, 1996, Ellis was traded to the California Angels for Pat Borders.

Ellis reached the majors in 1996 with the Angels, spending one year with them before moving to the Arizona Diamondbacks (2001), Los Angeles Dodgers (2002) and Texas Rangers (2003). His most productive season came in 2001 with Arizona, when he set career-highs in wins (6), strikeouts (41) and innings pitched (92.0).

In a four-season career, Ellis posted a 7–7 record with 54 strikeouts and a 6.03 ERA in 118.0 innings.

After that, Ellis pitched in the International League for the Cleveland and Philadelphia organizations.

On February 4, 2009, Ellis was named the Gulf Coast Mets pitching coach.

Beginning in late 2009, Ellis was the strength and conditioning and head baseball coach at Henderson High School in Henderson, Texas.

In August 2012, Ellis became Assistant Athletic Director and head baseball coach at Central Heights High School in Nacogdoches, Texas.

Following stints at Bullard High School, where he served as head baseball coach from 2015 to 2022 and Center Independent School District, where he served as athletic coordinator starting in 2023, Ellis became the head baseball coach at Longview High School in 2025.

== Personal life ==
Ellis is a family friend and mentor of pitcher Philip Humber.

Ellis' son, Duke, is a Major League Baseball outfielder. As of September 2025, he plays for the New York Yankees organization.
