= David Dellucci =

American baseball player (born 1973)

- Outfielder
- Born: October 31, 1973 (age 52); Baton Rouge, Louisiana, U.S.
- Batted: Left Threw: Left

MLB debut
- June 3, 1997, for the Baltimore Orioles

Last MLB appearance
- July 22, 2009, for the Toronto Blue Jays

MLB statistics
- Batting average: .256
- Home runs: 101
- Runs batted in: 398
- Stats at Baseball Reference

Teams
- Baltimore Orioles (1997); Arizona Diamondbacks (1998–2003); New York Yankees (2003); Texas Rangers (2004–2005); Philadelphia Phillies (2006); Cleveland Indians (2007–2009); Toronto Blue Jays (2009)

Career highlights and awards
- World Series champion (2001)

David Michael Dellucci (born October 31, 1973) is an American retired professional baseball outfielder, who played 13 seasons in Major League Baseball (MLB) for seven teams.

== High school ==
Dellucci graduated from Catholic High School in Baton Rouge, Louisiana in 1991. He earned the team's Most Valuable Player honors in both baseball and football, and All-State honors for baseball. He was also awarded the Catholic High Man of the Year award as a senior in 1991. During the winter of 2001, he was inducted into the Catholic High School Hall of Fame as a Grizzly Great.

== College ==
Dellucci played four seasons at the University of Mississippi (Ole Miss), where he was an All-Southeastern Conference (SEC) selection in both 1994 and 1995 and earned All-American status in 1995, setting 10 school records and winning the SEC batting title in hitting. He was named Athlete of the Year at Ole Miss in 1995. Dellucci was elected into the Ole Miss "M Club" Athletic Hall of Fame in 2010 and was named as one of the 50 Greatest Athletes in Ole Miss history. He was selected by the Minnesota Twins in the 11th round (295th overall) of the 1994 Major League Baseball draft, but chose to remain at Ole Miss.

== Career ==
In spite of playing well and racking up solid statistics as a college player, Dellucci was viewed by MLB Central Scouting as a utility outfielder when compared to the thick talent pool of other players in the 1995 Major League Baseball draft. As a result, he did not rate as a high pick, and he was eventually selected by the Baltimore Orioles in the 10th round (276th overall).

Dellucci made his major league debut with Baltimore on June 3, 1997, going 0-for-4 with a walk in a 7–5 win over the New York Yankees. On June 11, he recorded his first major league hit, an RBI single off Boston Red Sox pitcher Tom Gordon, which hit off of the Green Monster in Fenway Park. Dellucci hit his first major league home run on June 25 in a road game against Cal Eldred of the Milwaukee Brewers. In 17 games with the Orioles, he batted .222 with a home run and 3 RBI.

While playing in the Arizona Fall League during the offseason, Dellucci was selected by the Arizona Diamondbacks in the 1997-98 Major League Baseball expansion draft. He played for Arizona from the team's inaugural season in 1998 to 2003, and was a member of the World Series-winning squad in 2001.

As a rookie in 1998, Dellucci finished the season batting .260 with five home runs and 51 RBI in 124 games. He also led the National League in triples (12).

Dellucci got off to a hot start in 1999, posting a batting average of .394 with 27 runs, seven doubles, a triple, a home run and 15 RBI in 63 games. However, his season was cut short in late July when he was diagnosed with a degenerative bone disease in his left wrist, known as Kienböck's disease. He underwent reconstructive surgery on his left wrist on July 28. In honor of Dellucci, each Diamondback player and coach displayed his number on the side of their caps. Initially, the injury was thought to be potentially career-ending, but after the successful surgery and extensive rehabilitation, he returned to the team during spring training the next year. Dellucci hit .300 (15-for-50) with 2 RBI in 34 games with Arizona in 2000.

In 115 games during the 2001 season, Dellucci hit .276 with 10 home runs and 40 RBI in just 217 at bats. Six of the home runs came as a utility player and pinch hitter. In the 2001 postseason, Dellucci appeared in six games, mainly as a pinch hitter, and recorded two hits in four at bats while scoring one run. The Diamondbacks went on to defeat the New York Yankees in Game 7 of the 2001 World Series, giving Dellucci his first World Series ring.

On July 29, 2003, Dellucci was traded to the New York Yankees along with pitcher Bret Prinz and catcher John Sprowl, in exchange for outfielder Raúl Mondesí. He finished the 2003 season as a member of the American League champion Yankees and appeared in the 2003 World Series against the Florida Marlins. Dellucci recorded one hit in five at bats, while scoring three runs in eight playoff games. The Yankees lost the series to the Marlins in six games. On December 19, Dellucci was non-tendered by the Yankees, making him a free agent.

In December 2003, Dellucci signed a one-year, $750,000 contract with the Texas Rangers. For the 2004 season, Dellucci, in 331 at bats, hit .242 with 17 home runs and 61 RBI in 107 games. On September 23, with the Rangers looking to stay alive in the playoff race, Dellucci hit a walk-off two-run double to beat the Oakland Athletics 5–4 and keep the Rangers' playoff hopes alive. The Rangers went on to miss the postseason, but Dellucci's double has been described as one of the most memorable plays in Rangers franchise history. After the season, Dellucci agreed to a two-year, $1.8 million contract to remain with the Rangers on December 20.

In 2005, Dellucci had one of his best years as a professional. He hit .251 in 128 games, and recorded a season high in total at bats (435), home runs (29) and RBI (65). He is tied for second in Rangers history with four leadoff home runs.

On April 1, 2006, Dellucci was traded to the Philadelphia Phillies for pitcher Robinson Tejeda and minor league outfielder Jake Blalock. Until the trade of Bobby Abreu, Dellucci was used mostly as a pinch hitter/reserve outfielder, but still hit .292 with 13 home runs and 39 RBI in 264 at bats.

Dellucci signed a three-year, $11.5 million contract with the Cleveland Indians on December 6, 2006. On June 19, 2007, while running to first base, Dellucci tore his left hamstring tendon while running to first base, which required surgery and a trip to the disabled list. He was activated on September 6. Dellucci played in 56 games in his first season with Cleveland, batting .230 with four home runs and 20 RBI. In 2008, he appeared in 113 games and hit .238 with 11 home runs and 47 RBI.

Dellucci missed time early in Spring Training 2009 due to a surgically repaired thumb after smashing it in the tailgate of his trailer. He started the 2009 season on the disabled list with a strained left calf. While hitting .275 with an RBI in 40 at bats, he was designated for assignment by the Indians on May 29, and after clearing waivers, was released on June 1.

On June 10, 2009, Dellucci agreed to terms on a minor league contract with the Toronto Blue Jays. He was assigned to the Las Vegas 51's of the Pacific Coast League, where he hit .317 with three home runs and 9 RBI in 16 games. This led to the Blue Jays purchasing Dellucci's contract, on July 3. After a brief stint with the big league club in Toronto, he was designated for assignment on July 24, 2009, after recording one hit in 25 at bats (.040) as a Blue Jay. Electing not to accept his designation, he was released on July 31. Dellucci did not return to playing, and chose to retire.

== Career after baseball ==
Dellucci currently works as a color analyst for SEC Network and ESPN. He is also on the National Wildlife Federation's Vanishing Paradise advisory board.

In 2011, Dellucci was inducted into the Louisiana American Italian Hall of Fame.

In 2022, Dellucci was inducted into the Mississippi Sports Hall of Fame.

On March 29, 2025, Dellucci was elected to the city council of St. George, Louisiana.

== Charity ==
Dellucci has worked with several charities, such as Easter Seals, Special Olympics, Children with AIDS Foundation, and the Make-A-Wish Foundation. He is also on the board of directors for the Miracle League of Baton Rouge.

In 2005, after hurricanes Katrina and Rita, Dellucci formed his own charity called Catch 22 for Blue, in which he raised and personally distributed money for individuals, groups and schools which were affected by the tragedy along from Southeast Texas to Gulfport, Mississippi. He received a Commendation from the Louisiana House of Representatives and was recognized by the state Senate for his efforts. The foundation's name was later changed to the Dream Foundation in 2008, with new goals of supporting military families, sports and education camps for developing youth, and the restoration of parks and playgrounds throughout Cleveland and the state of Louisiana.

== Personal life ==
Dellucci is married to The Price Is Right model Rachel Reynolds and has appeared on four episodes of The Price Is Right with her; the first was for an engagement episode in 2010 in which he modeled a tuxedo, the second announcing the couple's first pregnancy on September 24, 2012, and the third in February 2018 for Valentine's Day. The couple welcomed their first child, Ruby Rey, on February 13, 2013, right on their third wedding anniversary. On June 6, 2023, the family appeared on The Price Is Right, commemorating Rachel's 20th anniversary on the popular game show.

== See also ==
- Arizona Diamondbacks award winners and league leaders
- List of Major League Baseball annual triples leaders
