= Nick Bierbrodt =

American baseball player (born 1978)

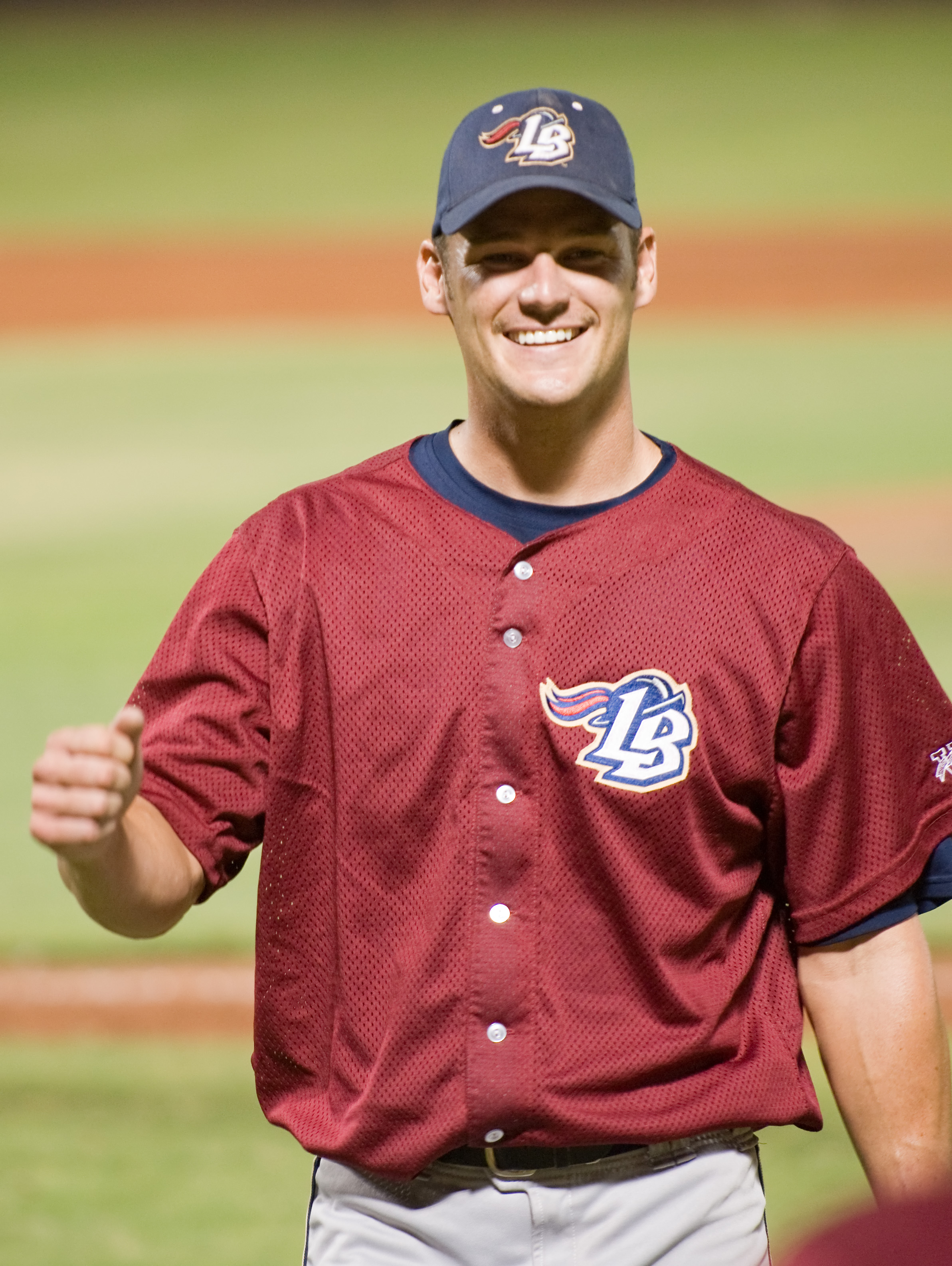
- Bierbrodt with the Long Beach Armada in 2008
- Pitcher
- Born: May 16, 1978 (age 48); Tarzana, California, U.S.
- Batted: Left Threw: Left

MLB debut
- June 7, 2001, for the Arizona Diamondbacks

Last MLB appearance
- July 6, 2004, for the Texas Rangers

MLB statistics
- Win–loss record: 6–9
- Earned run average: 6.66
- Strikeouts: 112
- Stats at Baseball Reference

Former teams
- Arizona Diamondbacks (2001); Tampa Bay Devil Rays (2001, 2003); Cleveland Indians (2003); Texas Rangers (2004)

Nicholas Raymond Bierbrodt (/ˈbɪərbrɔːt/ BEER-brawt; born May 16, 1978) is an American former professional baseball pitcher. He spent four seasons from 2001 to 2004 in Major League Baseball (MLB) with the Arizona Diamondbacks, Tampa Bay Devil Rays, Cleveland Indians and Texas Rangers.

== Career ==
He was a first-round pick for the Arizona Diamondbacks in the 1996 MLB draft, becoming the first player ever drafted by the franchise. He had compiled a minor league record of 28-28 from 1996 to 2001, when in 2001 he was promoted to the Major League team and added to the Diamondbacks rotation. He made 5 starts for the Diamondbacks before being traded to the Tampa Bay Devil Rays for Albie Lopez and Mike DiFelice. Between Arizona and Tampa Bay, Bierbrodt finished with a record of 5–6 with a 5.55 ERA in 16 starts.

Bierbrodt was shot three times in the arm and chest in a taxi cab in Charleston, South Carolina in June 2002. He missed the entire 2002 season while recovering.

In 2003, Bierbrodt made the Opening Day roster. His return to the Majors was short lived, as in 13 games for the Devil Rays, he had a 9.14 ERA and was later claimed off waivers by the Cleveland Indians In 2004, he signed as a free agent with the Texas Rangers, appearing in 4 starts for them that year.

In 2005, Bierbrodt signed with the Somerset Patriots, an independent league team. He would remain with the Patriots for two years before signing with the Bridgeport Bluefish. After playing for the Brother Elephants of the Chinese Professional Baseball League in 2007, he returned to the United States the next year, joining the Long Beach Armada of the independent Golden Baseball League.

In 2010, Bierbrodt signed a minor league deal with the Colorado Rockies. In 2011, the Baltimore Orioles signed Bierbrodt to a minor league deal. He spent 2011 in the Orioles farm system before retiring.
