= José Núñez (left-handed pitcher) =

Dominican baseball player (born 1979)

- Pitcher
- Born: March 14, 1979 (age 46); Monte Cristi, Dominican Republic
- Batted: Left Threw: Left

MLB debut
- April 3, 2001, for the Los Angeles Dodgers

Last MLB appearance
- April 1, 2002, for the San Diego Padres

MLB statistics
- Win–loss record: 4–2
- Earned run average: 4.50
- Strikeouts: 60
- Stats at Baseball Reference

Teams
- Los Angeles Dodgers (2001); San Diego Padres (2001–2002)

José Antonio Núñez (born March 14, 1979) is a Dominican former professional baseball pitcher. He pitched in Major League Baseball during parts of the 2001 and 2002 seasons for the Los Angeles Dodgers and San Diego Padres.
