= Alex Cintrón =

Puerto Rican baseball player and coach (born 1978)

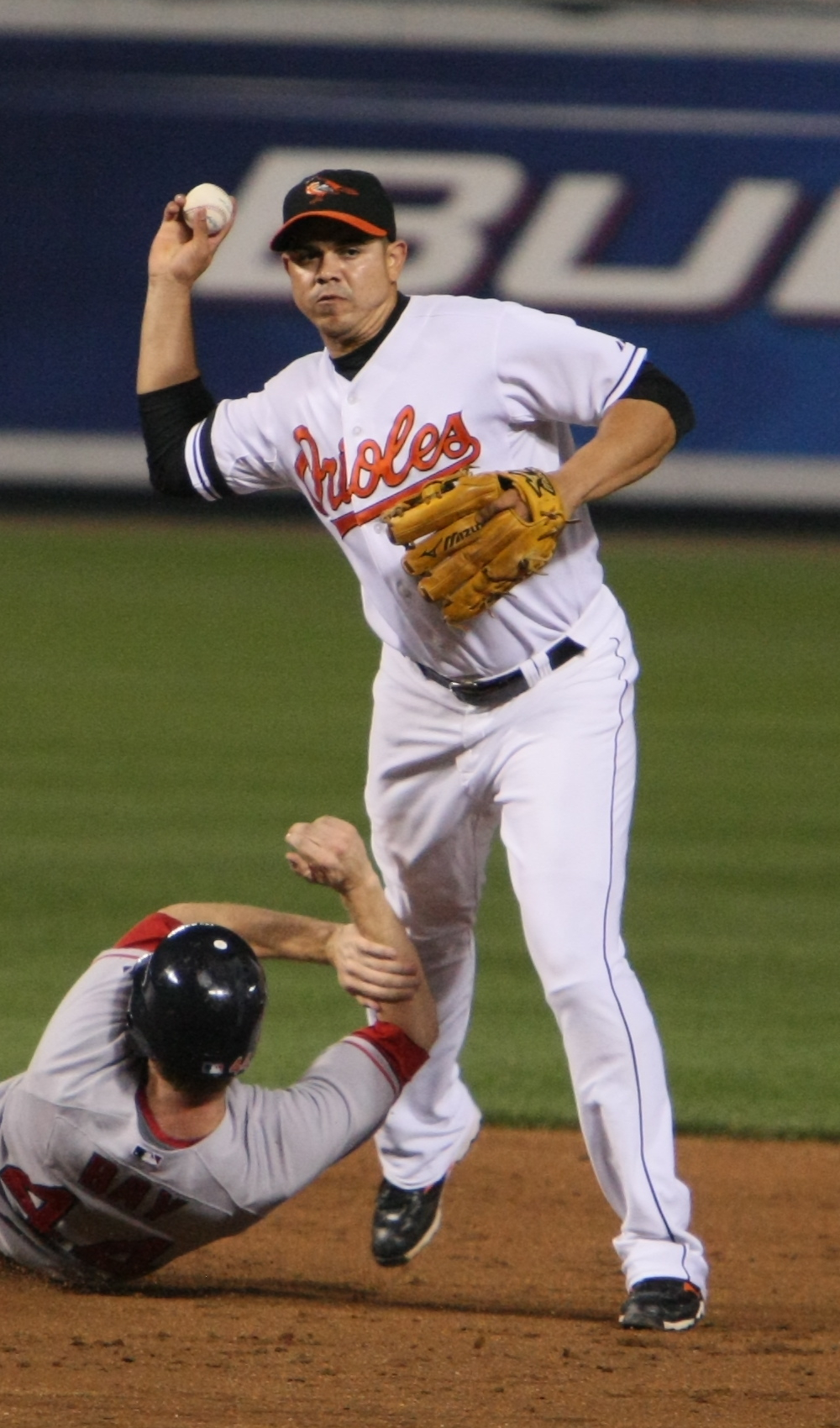
- Cintrón with the Baltimore Orioles in 2008

Texas Rangers – No. 73
- Infielder / Coach
- Born: December 17, 1978 (age 47); Humacao, Puerto Rico
- Batted: Switch Threw: Right

MLB debut
- July 24, 2001, for the Arizona Diamondbacks

Last MLB appearance
- May 19, 2009, for the Washington Nationals

MLB statistics
- Batting average: .275
- Home runs: 33
- Runs batted in: 222
- Stats at Baseball Reference

Teams
- As player: Arizona Diamondbacks (2001–2005); Chicago White Sox (2006–2007); Baltimore Orioles (2008); Washington Nationals (2009); As coach: Houston Astros (2018–2025); Texas Rangers (2026–present)

Career highlights and awards
- World Series champion (2022)

Alexander Cintrón (born December 17, 1978) is a Puerto Rican former professional baseball infielder who is currently the hitting coach for the Texas Rangers of Major League Baseball (MLB). He played in MLB for the Arizona Diamondbacks, Chicago White Sox, Baltimore Orioles, and Washington Nationals and was also the hitting coach for the Houston Astros.

== Playing career ==
=== Arizona Diamondbacks ===
Cintrón was drafted in the 36th round (1,103rd overall) of the 1997 Major League Baseball draft by the Arizona Diamondbacks. He spent the 1997 season with the Arizona League Diamondbacks where he hit .197 with six doubles, a triple and 20 RBI in 43 games. He also appeared in one game with the Lethbridge Black Diamonds in the Pioneer League and went 1-for-3.

In 1998, Cintrón spent the season with Rookie-League Lethbridge and hit .264 with 11 doubles, four triples, three home runs and 34 RBI in 67 games.

Cintrón hit .307 with 25 doubles, four triples, three home runs and 64 RBI in 128 games with the Class-A Advanced High Desert Mavericks during the 1999 season. He was also named to the California League All-Star team.

Cintrón played in 125 games for the Double-A El Paso Diablos and hit .301 with 30 doubles, six triples, four home runs and 59 RBIs in 2000. He was fourth in the Texas League in hits with 157, fifth in at-bats with 522 and tenth in average. He was also named to the Texas League All-Star team.

In 2001, Cintrón hit .292 with 24 doubles, three triples, three home runs and 35 RBIs in 107 games for the Triple-A Tucson Sidewinders. He was recalled from Tucson to the Diamondbacks on July 23. Cintrón made his major league debut with the D-Backs on July 24, 2001. He collected his first major-league hit with a single off the New York Mets' Donne Wall on August 3. Cintrón hit .286 with a triple in eight games with the Diamondbacks, and was optioned back to Tucson on August 6.

Cintrón played in 38 games with the D'Backs over four separate stints in 2002, batting .213 with 4 RBI. He was initially recalled on May 8, but played in just two games. He was recalled a second time on June 11 and reported to Yankee Stadium to play against the New York Yankees. He was optioned to Tucson again on June 26, but returned on July 1 after Erubiel Durazo was injured. Cintrón was returned to Tucson after the All-Star Break but was recalled for the final time on August 21.

In 2003, Cintrón had a break-out season after being recalled on May 6 following an injury to Craig Counsell. Cintrón went on to lead Arizona with a .317 average, ranked second with 26 doubles and third with 70 runs scored and a .489 slugging percentage. He started 90 games at shortstop, 14 at third base and five at second base. He batted .311 with runners in scoring position. He hit his first major-league home run on May 14 against the Philadelphia Phillies, a solo shot off Brett Myers. Cintrón posted three straight three-hit games from June 14 to June 17. He hit his first walk-off home run on June 20 against the Cincinnati Reds off Scott Williamson.

Cintrón continued his success into 2004, where he led the Diamondbacks in games played (154) and at-bats (564) and finished second in doubles (31) and third in hits (148). He was the everyday shortstop for most of the season until a late-season stretch of starts at second base. Cintrón became the first player in franchise history to hit a home run from both sides of the plate on July 8 against the San Francisco Giants, hitting a solo home run off Dustin Hermanson in the fourth inning and a three-run shot off Wayne Franklin in the seventh, finishing with a career-high 4 RBI.

Cintrón appeared in 122 games with Arizona in 2005, down from 154 in 2004. He played in 39 games at shortstop, 32 at third base and 23 at second base. He hit .304 with three doubles, three home runs and 12 RBIs as a pinch-hitter, sharing the major-league lead among pinch-hitters in home runs, tied for third in the National League in RBIs and ranked ninth in average. He hit the pinch-hit homers off Jim Brower, Kent Mercker and Jon Lieber. Cintrón had four walk-off hits during the season, the most in MLB in 2005.

=== Chicago White Sox ===
On March 8, 2006, Cintrón was traded to the Chicago White Sox for Jeff Bajenaru. That season, Cintrón made 41 appearances at shortstop, 26 at second base and 11 at third base, compiling a .972 fielding percentage. Cintrón stole a career high 10 bases. He batted .288 with all of his five home runs left-handed and .274 from the right side of the plate. He went only 2–18 as a pinch hitter. Cintrón recorded at least one at-bat in all positions in the lineup except leadoff, his best spot being second batting .315. He made two starts at designated hitter going 2–12 and hit .310 in interleague play. Cintrón hit two triples on April 13 against the Detroit Tigers, the first Sox player to accomplish the feat since José Valentín in 2004.

He batted .243 with two home runs and 19 RBI in 68 games in his second season with the White Sox in 2007. He made 19 appearances at third base, 17 at shortstop and 14 at second base. He also made two starts as designated hitter going 0–7. Cintrón compiled a .941 fielding percentage and batted .244 with two home runs left-handed and from the right side of the plate. He hit .273 on the road, compared to .209 at home. He hit .333 with runners in scoring position. The White Sox waived Cintrón on November 28, 2007.

=== Baltimore Orioles ===
Cintrón signed a minor league contract with an invitation to spring training with the Chicago Cubs on February 18, 2008. He was released on March 26, and was signed to another minor league contract by the Baltimore Orioles on March 31. After starting the season with the Norfolk Tides, his contract was purchased by the Orioles, and he was added to the active roster on May 11. He went 4-for-4 in his first start with Baltimore on May 17 against the Washington Nationals. On July 1, Cintrón was placed on the disabled list with a strained left hamstring. He was activated on August 1. He hit .352 at Camden Yards. 27 of 28 starts came at shortstop. Cintrón filed for free agency after the 2008 season.

=== Washington Nationals ===
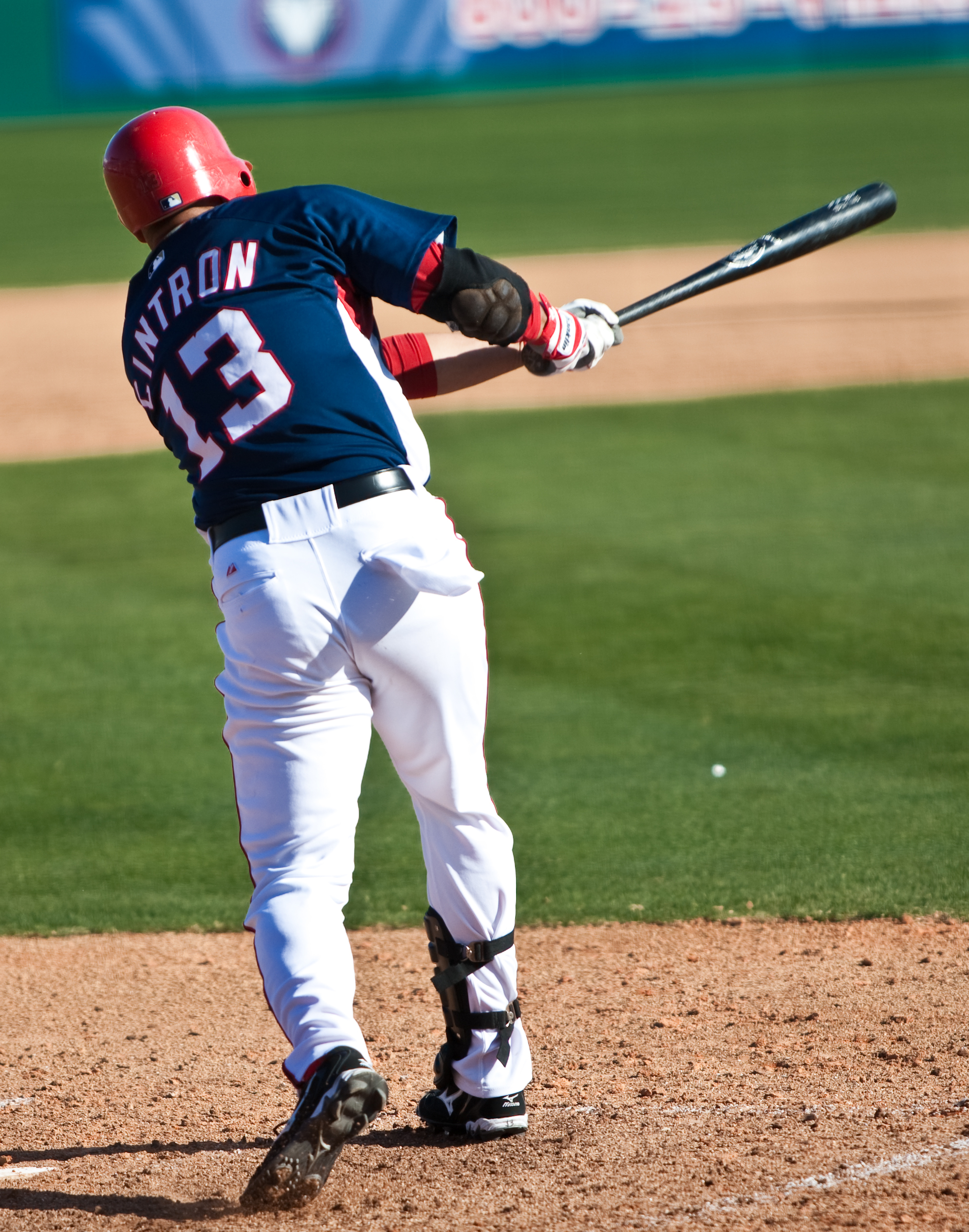
Cintrón with the Washington Nationals

Cintrón signed a minor league contract with the Washington Nationals for the 2009 season. Although he competed for a spot on the Nationals' roster during spring training, Cintrón was sent to the minors on April 4. His contract was purchased from the Triple-A Syracuse Chiefs on April 18. He went 2-for-26 (.077) in 21 games with the Nationals before he was designated for assignment on May 19.

=== Later career ===
On July 8, 2009, Cintrón signed a minor league contract with the Seattle Mariners. He played 30 games with the Triple-A Tacoma Rainiers, batting .248 with two home runs and 9 RBI. After the 2009 season, he signed a minor league deal with the New York Mets. With the Triple-A Buffalo Bisons, Cintrón batted .228 with a home run and 3 RBI in 20 games.

On February 8, 2011, Cintrón signed a minor league deal with the Washington Nationals. He signed a minor league contract with the San Diego Padres on May 3, 2011.

On May 24, 2011, Padres minor league broadcaster Tim Hagerty announced through Twitter that Cintrón had retired. No details were given; the tweet simply said "Alex Cintron has retired." It was reported on July 18 that he was considering coming out of retirement.

In early 2012, Cintrón came out of retirement to play for the Sugar Land Skeeters of the Atlantic League of Professional Baseball.

== Coaching career ==
Cintrón was Manager of the Azucareros de Yabucoa (his hometown) in Puerto Rico's Superior Baseball League (Double-A Category).

The Houston Astros hired Cintrón as the club's Spanish-language interpreter, advance scout, and assistant coach for the 2017 season. He served as the Astros' first base coach in 2018. The Astros reassigned him as hitting coach following the 2019 season.

On August 11, 2020, Cintrón was suspended 20 games for inciting a brawl with Ramón Laureano on August 9, one of the longest ever suspensions of an MLB coach for an on-field incident. Cintrón had stepped out of the Astros dugout onto the field and taunted Laureano to approach him, as if to fight, after Laureano complained about getting hit by pitches. Cintrón remained behind several Astros players when Laureano charged at him.

Cintrón was announced as the first manager of RA12 before their inaugural 2020–21 season but withdrew from the team in late October due to health concerns.

In 2022, the Astros won 106 games, the second-highest total in franchise history. They advanced to the World Series and defeated the Philadelphia Phillies in six games. In the pivotal Game 6, Cintron and fellow hitting coach Troy Snitker noticed that Yordan Alvarez had a hitch in his swing (namely due to his weight being shifted in his front leg) that merited adjustment. Cintron looked at video from a few months ago and saw that Alvarez's hands had dropped in his stance from June, which made it harder to deal with a fastball. Alvarez would go on to hit the go-ahead home run in the sixth inning to deliver the championship. The win gave Cintrón his first World Series title as an Astro.

Prior to the 2023 season, the Toronto Blue Jays interviewed Cintrón for their bench coach position. While the Blue Jays had still yet to finalize their decision, it was announced on November 21, 2022, that the Astros signed Cintrón to a contract to remain through the 2025 season. On October 9, 2025, Cintrón and the Astros parted ways.

On November 13, 2025, Cintrón was hired by the Texas Rangers to serve as the team's assistant hitting coach.

== See also ==
- List of Major League Baseball players from Puerto Rico
- Houston Astros sign stealing scandal

Sporting positions
Preceded by Rich Dauer	Houston Astros first base coach 2018	Succeeded by Don Kelly
Preceded by Dave Hudgens	Houston Astros hitting coach 2019–2025	Succeeded by Vic Rodriguez
Preceded by Bret Boone	Texas Rangers hitting coach 2026–present	Succeeded by Incumbent
