= Eric Knott =

American baseball player (born 1974)

- Pitcher
- Born: September 23, 1974 (age 51); Harvey, Illinois, U.S.
- Batted: Left Threw: Left

Professional debut
- NPB: July 6, 2000, for the Chiba Lotte Marines
- MLB: September 1, 2001, for the Arizona Diamondbacks

Last appearance
- NPB: August 19, 2000, for the Chiba Lotte Marines
- MLB: August 26, 2003, for the Montreal Expos

NPB statistics
- Win–loss record: 1–1
- Earned run average: 11.02
- Strikeouts: 6

MLB statistics
- Win–loss record: 1–3
- Earned run average: 4.50
- Strikeouts: 21
- Stats at Baseball Reference

Teams
- Chiba Lotte Marines (2000); Arizona Diamondbacks (2001); Montreal Expos (2003)

Eric James Knott (born September 23, 1974) is an American former professional baseball pitcher who played Major League Baseball for two seasons. He pitched for the Arizona Diamondbacks in 2001 and the Montreal Expos in 2003, playing in 16 career games.

Knott attended Florida Southwestern State College and Stetson University, and in 1994 he played collegiate summer baseball with the Harwich Mariners of the Cape Cod Baseball League. He was selected by the Diamondbacks in the 24th round of the 1996 MLB draft.
