= Erik Sabel =

American baseball player (born 1974)

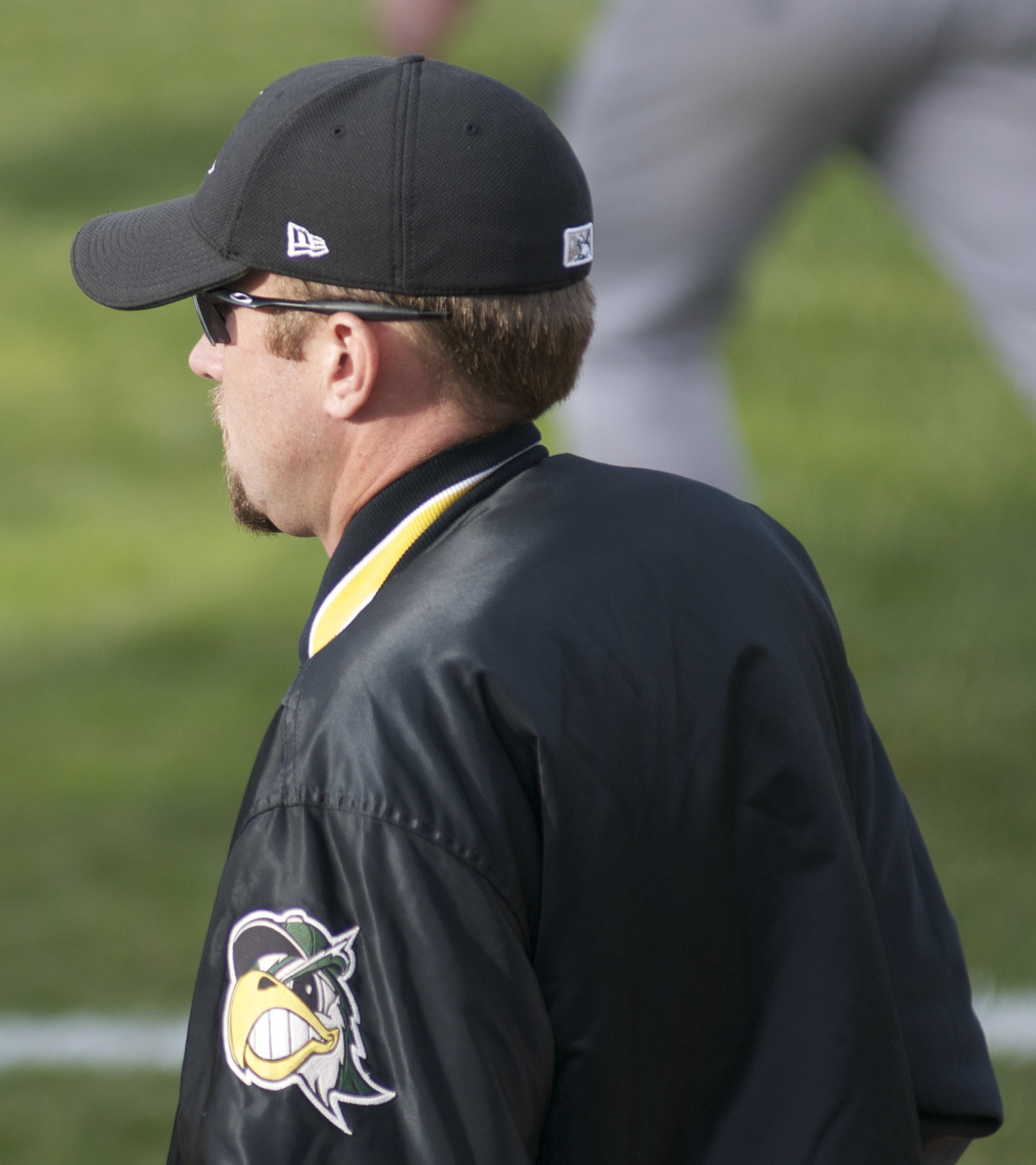
- Sabel with the South Bend Silver Hawks in 2008
- Pitcher
- Born: October 14, 1974 (age 51); West Lafayette, Indiana, U.S.
- Batted: Right Threw: Right

MLB debut
- July 9, 1999, for the Arizona Diamondbacks

Last MLB appearance
- July 28, 2002, for the Detroit Tigers

MLB statistics
- Win–loss record: 3–2
- Earned run average: 5.02
- Strikeouts: 31
- Stats at Baseball Reference

Teams
- Arizona Diamondbacks (1999, 2001); Detroit Tigers (2002)

Erik Sabel (born October 14, 1974) is an American former Major League Baseball pitcher who played for three seasons. He played for the Arizona Diamondbacks in 1999 and 2001 and the Detroit Tigers in 2002.

== Career ==
Following his playing career, Sabel has been pitching coach for the minor league Yakima Bears (2005–2007), South Bend Silver Hawks (2008–2009), and Visalia Rawhide (2010). In 2011, he became baseball coach for Mountain View High School in Tucson, Arizona.
