= Junior Spivey =

American baseball player (born 1975)

- Second baseman
- Born: January 28, 1975 (age 51); Oklahoma City, Oklahoma, U.S.
- Batted: Right Threw: Right

MLB debut
- June 2, 2001, for the Arizona Diamondbacks

Last MLB appearance
- September 27, 2005, for the Washington Nationals

MLB statistics
- Batting average: .270
- Home runs: 48
- Runs batted in: 201
- Stats at Baseball Reference

Teams
- Arizona Diamondbacks (2001–2003); Milwaukee Brewers (2004–2005); Washington Nationals (2005)

Career highlights and awards
- All-Star (2002)

Ernest Lee "Junior" Spivey Jr. (born January 28, 1975) is an American former second baseman in Major League Baseball. In his five-year major league career, Spivey batted .270 with 48 home runs and 201 runs batted in in 457 games. He made the National League All-Star team in 2002. He batted and threw right-handed.

== Career ==
Spivey attended Cowley County College in Arkansas City, Kansas. He was selected by the Arizona Diamondbacks in the 36th round of the 1996 amateur draft and played in the major leagues for the Diamondbacks from 2001 to 2003. He was a member of the Arizona Diamondbacks team when they won the World Series in 2001, 4 games to 3, against the New York Yankees.

Spivey was traded to the Milwaukee Brewers with Craig Counsell, Lyle Overbay, Chad Moeller, Chris Capuano and Jorge de la Rosa for Richie Sexson, Shane Nance and Noochie Varner. Spivey played for the Brewers in 2004 and 2005, until he was traded on June 10, 2005, to the Washington Nationals for pitcher Tomokazu Ohka. He signed with the St. Louis Cardinals on December 23, and spent the entire 2006 season with the Triple-A Memphis Redbirds. He filed for free agency from the Cardinals after the season.

Following a stint with the Bridgeport Bluefish of the independent Atlantic League of Professional Baseball in 2007, the Boston Red Sox signed Spivey to a minor league contract and assigned him to the Pawtucket Red Sox, their triple-A affiliate. Spivey re-signed with the Red Sox in January 2008, but was released during spring training.

Spivey was signed to a minor league contract by the New York Mets on March 16, 2009. However, he was released on March 31. During the 2009 season, Spivey played for the Camden Riversharks of the Atlantic League and the Tucson Toros of the Golden Baseball League.

In 2010, Junior Spivey retired from baseball.
