= Mike Koplove =

American baseball player (born 1976)

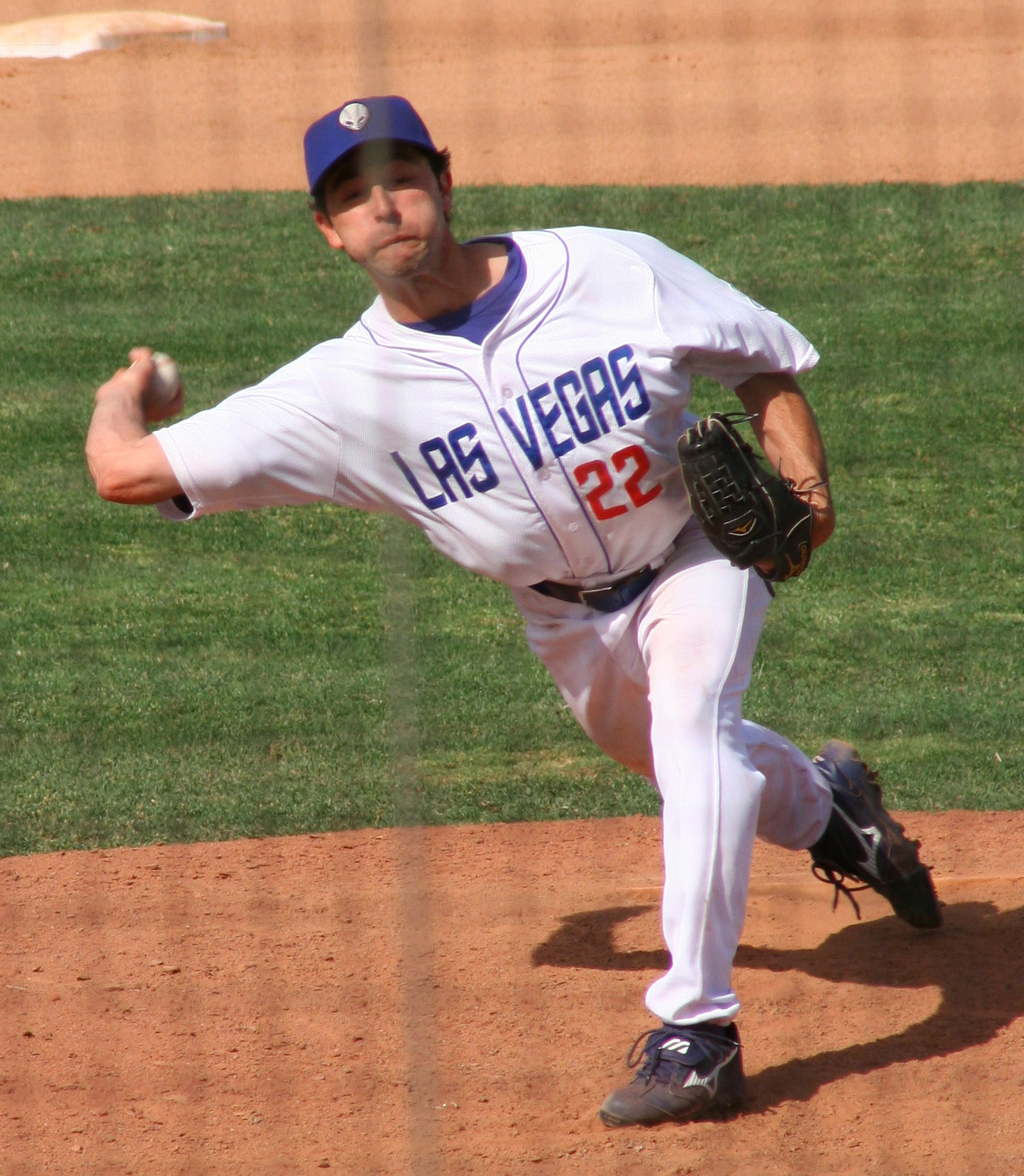
- Koplove pitching for the Las Vegas 51s in 2008
- Relief pitcher
- Born: August 30, 1976 (age 50); Philadelphia, Pennsylvania, U.S.
- Batted: Right Threw: Right

MLB debut
- September 6, 2001, for the Arizona Diamondbacks

Last MLB appearance
- September 26, 2007, for the Cleveland Indians

MLB statistics
- Win–loss record: 15–7
- Earned run average: 3.82
- Strikeouts: 175
- Stats at Baseball Reference

Teams
- Arizona Diamondbacks (2001–2006); Cleveland Indians (2007)
Medals
Men's baseball
Representing United States
Olympic Games
Bronze medal – third place	2008 Beijing	Team

Michael Paul Koplove (/ˈkɒpləv/; born August 30, 1976) is an American professional baseball scout and former pitcher. He played in Major League Baseball (MLB) for the Arizona Diamondbacks and Cleveland Indians.

A sidearm relief pitcher, Koplove threw with a different arm angle than most pitchers. His arm angle was perpendicular to his body, which allowed his fastball to sink and his curveball and slider to stay on the same plane, making it appear to be a fastball. He won a bronze medal with Team USA in the 2008 Olympics.

== Early life ==
Koplove was born in Philadelphia, Pennsylvania. He is the son of Steve (an attorney) and Lorraine Milito, and is half Jewish and half Christian. He is the older brother of Joey Criniti and minor league and Team Israel pitcher Kenny Koplove, who is 17 years younger. He also has three sisters; named Andrea and Erica and Franca.

Koplove grew up in South Philadelphia and attended Chestnut Hill Academy in Philadelphia (where he was a first-team Philadelphia Daily News All-City selection as a senior) from which he graduated in 1995. After high school Koplove first attended Northwestern University for two years where he played shortstop and pitched, before transferring to the University of Delaware prior to his junior year. In 1997, he played collegiate summer baseball with the Chatham A's of the Cape Cod Baseball League. During his junior season at the University of Delaware, he helped lead the team to the 1998 America East Championship and the NCAA Atlantic II Regional. He was voted an Academic All American. He was drafted by the Arizona Diamondbacks in the 29th round of the 1998 Major League Baseball draft.

== Playing career ==
=== Arizona Diamondbacks (2001–06) ===
He played for the Diamondbacks 2001 World Series championship team, for which he was 0–1 with a 3.60 ERA, but was not on the World Series roster.

In 2002, Koplove was 6–1 with a 3.36 ERA in 55 games, giving up only 47 hits in 61.2 innings (holding batters to a .213 batting average and a .276 slugging percentage; with men on base he was even stingier – .207/.228). In games that were late and close, he held batters to a .188 batting average. He was named the Diamondbacks 2002 Rookie of the Year.

In 2003, Koplove was 3–0 with a 2.14 ERA in 31 games. With runners in scoring position, he held batters to a .100 batting average, and a .133 slugging percentage, and he held the first batters he faced to a .074 batting average. He had surgery for a frayed labrum and rotator cuff.

In 2004, Koplove set career highs in appearances (76), innings pitched (86.2), strikeouts (55), and saves (2), but his ERA was at 4.05. He was awarded the Diamondbacks 2004 Good Guy Award.

In 2005, Koplove's struggles continued as his ERA ballooned even higher (5.07) in 44 appearances.

Koplove only appeared in two games in the 2006 season. He spent the majority of the year in Triple-A, where he had a 5–0 record in 48 games.

In 6 seasons with the Diamondbacks (2001–06), Koplove made 217 relief appearances (3rd in team history as of May 2007), compiling a 15–7 record with 2 saves and a 3.76 ERA.

=== Florida Marlins organization (2007) ===
In January 2007, the Florida Marlins extended a spring training invitation to Koplove, who signed a minor league contract with the ballclub, but in March 2007 they released him.

=== Cleveland Indians (2007) ===
In March 2007, the Cleveland Indians agreed to terms with Koplove on a minor league contract. On May 23, the team called him up from the Triple-A Buffalo Bisons. He was 2–0 with 3 saves and a 1.00 ERA in 17 relief appearances (18 innings, 15 hits, 2 earned runs, 8 walks, 14 strikeouts). He limited batters to a .224 average and a .111 average with runners in scoring position.

Eight days later, the team optioned Koplove to the Bisons. Koplove appeared in three games after being called up. He allowed two earned runs in four innings for a 4.50 ERA. In 2007, with the Buffalo Bisons he was 4–2 with 14 saves and a 2.50 ERA in 51 relief appearances.

=== Los Angeles Dodgers organization (2008) ===
After becoming a minor league free agent following the conclusion of the 2007 season, Koplove signed a minor league contract with an invitation to spring training with the Los Angeles Dodgers on December 12, 2007. He pitched the entire year for the Dodgers Triple-A affiliate, the Las Vegas 51s.

=== Olympics (2008) ===
In 2008, he was named to the United States national baseball team for the 2008 Olympics in Beijing. Koplove played for the 2008 US Olympic team, earning a bronze medal with the club in Beijing, China. He was the only American pitcher not to give up a hit; he pitched 5 1/3 innings in four appearances, and struck out six.

=== Philadelphia Phillies organization (2009) ===
Koplove was signed by the Philadelphia Phillies to a minor league contract after the 2008 season, and was invited to spring training as a non-roster invitee. After spring training, however, he was sent to the Lehigh Valley IronPigs in the International League. His contract called for him to be paid $16,000 per month in the minors, as opposed to $550,000 if he made it to the big league team. On June 1, 2009, Koplove exercised a clause in his contract that stated if he was not on the major league roster by June 1, he would be granted his outright release.

=== Pittsburgh Pirates organization (2009) ===
On June 6, 2009, Koplove signed a minor league deal with the Pittsburgh Pirates, and was assigned to the Indianapolis Indians, also in the International League.

=== Seattle Mariners organization (2009–10) ===
On August 4, 2009, the Pirates traded Koplove to the Seattle Mariners for minor league shortstop Deybis Benitez. He was granted free agency in November 2009.

On December 22, 2009, Koplove signed a minor league contract with the Seattle Mariners. On July 1, 2010, Koplove was released by Seattle.

=== San Diego Padres organization (2010–11) ===
The Padres signed Koplove in August 2010, and re-signed him in February 2011. However, he didn't make the spring training roster and was cut in March 2011.

=== Camden Riversharks (2011) ===
He signed with Camden Riversharks of the Indy league in April 2011. He filed for free agency hoping to sign on to a new team.

== Scouting career ==
Koplove worked for six seasons on the scouting staff of the Anaheim Angels. He then joined the Philadelphia Phillies as a special assignment scout before the 2018 season.

In the fall of 2019 the Philadelphia Phillies interviewed Koplove for the position of scouting director.

== Hall of Fame ==
In 2019 he was inducted into the Philadelphia Jewish Sports Hall of Fame.
