= Bret Prinz =

American baseball player (born 1977)

- Pitcher
- Born: June 15, 1977 (age 49); Chicago Heights, Illinois, U.S.
- Batted: Right Threw: Right

MLB debut
- April 22, 2001, for the Arizona Diamondbacks

Last MLB appearance
- June 12, 2007, for the Chicago White Sox

MLB statistics
- Win–loss record: 5–4
- Earned run average: 4.89
- Strikeouts: 64
- Stats at Baseball Reference

Teams
- Arizona Diamondbacks (2001–2003); New York Yankees (2003–2004); Los Angeles Angels of Anaheim (2005); Chicago White Sox (2007)

Bret Randolph Prinz (born June 15, 1977) is an American former Major League Baseball (MLB) relief pitcher who played with the Arizona Diamondbacks (2001–2003), New York Yankees (2003–2004), Los Angeles Angels of Anaheim (2005), and Chicago White Sox (2007). He batted and threw right-handed.

He began his major league career with the Diamondbacks in 2001, achieving success out of the bullpen. He would remain with the team until 2003, where he was traded to the New York Yankees. Prinz would remain with the Yankees for a season and a half, going 1–0 with a 5.93 ERA. The Yankees then traded Prinz to the Los Angeles Angels of Anaheim for catcher Wil Nieves.

In 2006, Prinz signed a minor league deal with the Colorado Rockies. In 2007, Prinz pitched for three organizations before being signed by the White Sox. After being designated for assignment on June 15, 2007, by the White Sox, Prinz chose to become a free agent, and signed a deal to pitch for the Chicago Cubs' Triple-A affiliate, the Iowa Cubs.

On February 29, 2008, Prinz signed with the Somerset Patriots of the independent Atlantic League of Professional Baseball. He served as their closer until May 31, 2008, when his contract was purchased by the Oakland Athletics and assigned to Triple-A Sacramento. He became a free agent at the end of the season and re-signed with the Patriots on March 4, 2009.

He has worked for Waste Management since 2010.
