= Albie Lopez =

American baseball player (born 1971)

- Pitcher
- Born: August 18, 1971 (age 54); Mesa, Arizona, U.S.
- Batted: Right Threw: Right

MLB debut
- July 6, 1993, for the Cleveland Indians

Last MLB appearance
- June 19, 2003, for the Kansas City Royals

MLB statistics
- Win–loss record: 47–58
- Earned run average: 4.94
- Strikeouts: 558
- Stats at Baseball Reference

Teams
- Cleveland Indians (1993–1997); Tampa Bay Devil Rays (1998–2001); Arizona Diamondbacks (2001); Atlanta Braves (2002); Kansas City Royals (2003)

Career highlights and awards
- World Series champion (2001)
Medals
Men's baseball
Representing United States
World Junior Baseball Championship
Gold medal – first place	1989 Trois-Rivières	Team

Albert Anthony "Albie" Lopez (born August 18, 1971) is an American former Major League Baseball pitcher. He graduated from Mesa Community College. He was drafted by the Cleveland Indians in the 20th round of the 1991 Major League Baseball draft. Lopez spent five years with the Indians, compiling a record of 12–14 with a 5.99 ERA between 1993 and 1997.

Lopez was selected by the Tampa Bay Devil Rays in the second round (48th pick overall) of the expansion draft in 1997. In 1998, Lopez had a career best 2.60 ERA in 54 games for the expansion team Devil Rays.

In 1999, his ERA rose to 4.64 while appearing in 51 games. In 2000, Lopez was a swingman, appearing in 45 games while also starting 24 games for the Devil Rays. He won a career-high 11 games while throwing 4 complete games and 2 saves.

The Devil Rays then traded Lopez to the Arizona Diamondbacks in 2001 after going 5–12 in 20 starts for the Devil Rays. With the Diamondbacks, Lopez recorded 4 wins in 13 starts. Between both clubs, Lopez finished the 2001 season with a major league leading 19 losses, although not officially leading any league due to him having been traded and splitting time between both leagues. He was part of the 2001 World Series winning team over the New York Yankees. Lopez was criticized for his poor performance on the team, which led him to sign with the Atlanta Braves at the end of that season. Lopez was 1–4 in 55.2 innings for the Braves.

He then signed with the Kansas City Royals for the 2003 season. Despite having a record of 4–2 in 15 games, his ERA sat at 12.71 for the Royals, which prompted them to releasing Lopez.

Lopez then signed a minor league contract with the Pittsburgh Pirates in 2005, but was released on March 23, 2005. He signed with the Seattle Mariners on April 19, 2005, but was released just under a month later on May 15.

During an 11-year baseball career, Lopez compiled 47 wins, 558 strikeouts, and a 4.94 earned run average. He was an Eastern League All-Star with the Canton–Akron Indians, which was the Indians' Double A affiliate in 1993. Lopez pitched during the 2011 season for the Edmonton Capitals of the North American League.

Preceded by Steve Trachsel	Tampa Bay Devil Rays Opening Day; Starting pitcher 2001	Succeeded by Tanyon Sturtze
