= 2001 National League Division Series =

American baseball games

Teams
Team (Wins)		Manager	Season
Atlanta Braves (3)		Bobby Cox	88–74 (.543), GA: 2
Houston Astros (0)		Larry Dierker	93–69 (.574), GA: 0
- Dates: October 9–12
- Television: Fox Family (Games 1–2); Fox (Game 3)
- TV announcers: Kenny Albert (Games 1–2), Mel Proctor (Game 3), and Rod Allen
- Radio: ESPN
- Radio announcers: Wayne Hagin and Buck Showalter
- Umpires: Games 1–2: Bruce Froemming, Chuck Meriwether, Mike Winters, Brian Gorman, Jim Joyce, Mike Everitt; Games 3: Randy Marsh, John Hirschbeck, Larry Young, Tim Tschida, Dale Scott, Alfonso Márquez

Teams
Team (Wins)		Manager	Season
Arizona Diamondbacks (3)		Bob Brenly	92–70 (.568), GA: 2
St. Louis Cardinals (2)		Tony La Russa	93–69 (.574), GB: 0
- Dates: October 9–14
- Television: Fox Family (Games 1–4); Fox (Game 5)
- TV announcers: Thom Brennaman and Steve Lyons (Games 1–2); Joe Buck and Tim McCarver (Games 3–5)
- Radio: ESPN
- Radio announcers: Charley Steiner and Dave Campbell
- Umpires: Games 1–2: Randy Marsh, John Hirschbeck, Larry Young, Tim Tschida, Dale Scott, Alfonso Márquez; Games 3–5: Bruce Froemming, Chuck Meriwether, Mike Winters, Brian Gorman, Jim Joyce, Mike Everitt

The 2001 National League Division Series (NLDS), consisted of two best-of-five playoff series on the National League side in Major League Baseball’s (MLB) 2001 postseason, began on Tuesday, October 9, and ended on Sunday, October 14, with the champions of the three NL divisions—along with a "wild card" team—participating in two series.

Under MLB's playoff format, no two teams from the same division were matched up in the Division Series, regardless of whether their records would normally indicate such a matchup. Home field advantage went to the team with the better regular-season record with the exception of the wild card team, which defers home field advantage regardless of record. The matchups were:

- (1) Houston Astros (NL Central champions) vs. (3) Atlanta Braves (NL East champions): Braves won the series, 3–0.
- (2) Arizona Diamondbacks (NL West champions) vs. (4) St. Louis Cardinals (Wild Card qualifier): Diamondbacks won the series, 3–2.

The higher seeded team in each series hosts Games 1, 2, and 5 (if necessary), and the lower seeded team hosts Games 3 and 4 (if necessary).

The Diamondbacks and Braves went on to meet in the NL Championship Series (NLCS). The Diamondbacks became the National League champion, and defeated the American League champion New York Yankees in the 2001 World Series.

== Matchups ==
=== Houston Astros vs. Atlanta Braves ===
Atlanta won the series, 3–0.

Game	Date	Score	Location	Time	Attendance
1	October 9	Atlanta Braves – 7, Houston Astros – 4	Enron Field	2:51	35,553
2	October 10	Atlanta Braves – 1, Houston Astros – 0	Enron Field	2:41	35,704
3	October 12	Houston Astros – 2, Atlanta Braves – 6	Turner Field	2:33	39,923

=== Arizona Diamondbacks vs. St. Louis Cardinals ===
Arizona won the series, 3–2.

Game	Date	Score	Location	Time	Attendance
1	October 9	St. Louis Cardinals – 0, Arizona Diamondbacks – 1	Bank One Ballpark	2:36	42,251
2	October 10	St. Louis Cardinals – 4, Arizona Diamondbacks – 1	Bank One Ballpark	3:15	41,793
3	October 12	Arizona Diamondbacks – 5, St. Louis Cardinals – 3	Busch Stadium (II)	3:36	52,273
4	October 13	Arizona Diamondbacks – 1, St. Louis Cardinals – 4	Busch Stadium (II)	2:47	52,194
5	October 14	St. Louis Cardinals – 1, Arizona Diamondbacks – 2	Bank One Ballpark	3:05	42,810

== Houston vs. Atlanta ==
The Atlanta Braves won their tenth straight division title, despite having the worst record (88–74) among playoff teams. With that record, 2001 was also the Braves' worst season since 1990, when they had the worst record in baseball. The Houston Astros were in the playoffs for the seventh time, hoping to avenge two postseason losses in the 1990s to the Braves. At 93–69, and having home field advantage throughout the playoffs, the Astros were heavily favored to win this series.

=== Game 1 ===
October 9, 2001 12:12 pm (CDT) at Enron Field in Houston, Texas 80 °F (27 °C), Roof open, cloudy
Team	1	2	3	4	5	6	7	8	9	R	H	E
Atlanta	1	0	0	1	0	0	0	4	1	7	13	1
Houston	0	0	0	0	2	1	0	0	1	4	6	1
WP: Rudy Seánez (1–0) LP: Mike Jackson (0–1) Sv: John Smoltz (1); Home runs: ATL: Brian Jordan (1), Chipper Jones (1), Andruw Jones (1); HOU: Brad Ausmus (1), Vinny Castilla (1); Attendance: 35,553; Boxscore

In Game 1, Greg Maddux of Atlanta faced Wade Miller of Houston. Brian Jordan drove in the first two runs of the game, hitting a sacrifice fly in the first with runners on first and third and a homer in the fourth. Brad Ausmus's two-run homer after a walk tied the game in the fifth for the Astros. Then Moisés Alou's groundout with runners on second and third in the sixth gave the Astros the lead, but the Braves refused to concede. In the eighth, Keith Lockhart hit a leadoff double off of Mike Jackson and scored on Marcus Giles's single to tie the game. Julio Franco reached on an error before Billy Wagner relieved Jackson and allowed a tie-breaking three-run home run to Chipper Jones. Andruw Jones's leadoff home run in the ninth off of Mike Williams made it 7–3. Vinny Castilla's leadoff home run in the bottom half gave the Astros that run back, but John Smoltz got the save as the Braves won 7–4.

=== Game 2 ===
October 10, 2001 12:12 pm (CDT) at Enron Field in Houston, Texas 80 °F (27 °C), Roof open, cloudy
Team	1	2	3	4	5	6	7	8	9	R	H	E
Atlanta	0	1	0	0	0	0	0	0	0	1	7	0
Houston	0	0	0	0	0	0	0	0	0	0	7	2
WP: Tom Glavine (1–0) LP: Dave Mlicki (0–1) Sv: John Smoltz (2); Attendance: 35,704; Boxscore

In Game 2, Tom Glavine and Dave Mlicki started a classic pitching duel. In the top of the second, B. J. Surhoff doubled to lead off the inning. Then Andruw Jones singled to the shortstop and an error by Julio Lugo put Surhoff on third. Rey Sánchez would then ground into a double play, but Surhoff would score to make it 1–0 Braves. In all but two innings the Astros had a hit and stranded five in the game. Glavine pitched eight innings and Smoltz recorded his second consecutive postseason save.

=== Game 3 ===
October 12, 2001 4:20 pm (EDT) at Turner Field in Atlanta, Georgia, 77 °F (25 °C), Cloudy
Team	1	2	3	4	5	6	7	8	9	R	H	E
Houston	0	0	0	0	0	0	2	0	0	2	6	0
Atlanta	0	2	1	1	0	0	0	2	X	6	10	0
WP: John Burkett (1–0) LP: Shane Reynolds (0–1); Home runs: HOU: Daryle Ward (1); ATL: Paul Bako (1), Julio Franco (1), Chipper Jones (2); Attendance: 39,923; Boxscore

In Game 3, Shane Reynolds of Houston faced John Burkett of the Braves. In the bottom of the second, Rey Sanchez doubled with two outs before Paul Bako's two-run homer put the Braves up 2–0. In the third, Julio Franco homered to make it 3–0. Then a squeeze play sacrifice bunt by Bako in the fourth with runners on first and third made it 4–0. Reynolds only lasted four innings and Burkett cruised until giving up a two-run homer to Daryle Ward in the seventh. Chipper Jones's two-run homer provided insurance in the bottom of the eighth of off Octavio Dotel and Smoltz once again dominated the ninth. Ausmus flied to center to end the series. Once again, the Astros had been denied by the Braves for their first ever postseason series win. This was the last postseason series win by the Braves until 2020, when they swept the Cincinnati Reds in the newly-added Wild Card Series.

=== Composite box ===
2001 NLDS (3–0): Atlanta Braves over Houston Astros

Team	1	2	3	4	5	6	7	8	9	R	H	E
Atlanta Braves	1	3	1	2	0	0	0	6	1	14	30	1
Houston Astros	0	0	0	0	2	1	2	0	1	6	19	3
Total attendance: 111,180 Average attendance: 37,060

== Arizona vs. St. Louis ==
The St. Louis Cardinals were making their second straight postseason appearance and they hoped to avenge their NLCS loss against the New York Mets in 2000. The Arizona Diamondbacks were making their second playoff appearance and they too were stunned by the Mets in 1999, having won 100 games that year. This was the first NLDS to go to 5 games.

=== Game 1 ===
October 9, 2001 5:15 pm (MST) at Bank One Ballpark in Phoenix, Arizona 82 °F (28 °C), Roof Open, Clear
Team	1	2	3	4	5	6	7	8	9	R	H	E
St. Louis	0	0	0	0	0	0	0	0	0	0	3	1
Arizona	0	0	0	0	1	0	0	0	X	1	8	1
WP: Curt Schilling (1–0) LP: Matt Morris (0–1); Attendance: 42,251; Boxscore

Game 1 was a game of excellent starting pitching. Matt Morris faced Curt Schilling, who made the most of his first playoff start in eight years. Both pitchers were on even terms until Arizona scored the game's only run in the bottom of the fifth when Steve Finley singled home Damian Miller, who was hit by a pitch leading off the inning and moved to second on a sacrifice bunt. Schilling pitched a complete-game three-hit shutout as Arizona won 1–0 to take a 1–0 series lead.

=== Game 2 ===
October 10, 2001 1:20 pm (MST) at Bank One Ballpark in Phoenix, Arizona 72 °F (22 °C), Roof Closed
Team	1	2	3	4	5	6	7	8	9	R	H	E
St. Louis	2	0	1	0	0	0	0	0	1	4	7	0
Arizona	0	0	0	0	0	0	0	1	0	1	5	2
WP: Woody Williams (1–0) LP: Randy Johnson (0–1) Sv: Steve Kline (1); Home runs: STL: Albert Pujols (1); AZ: None; Attendance: 41,793; Boxscore

In Game 2, Woody Williams of St. Louis faced Randy Johnson of Arizona. Johnson seemingly had the Cardinals in the first when he got Plácido Polanco to ground into a double play. But Édgar Rentería walked and the soon-to-be-named NL Rookie of the Year Albert Pujols hit his first playoff home run to make it 2–0. Williams hit a leadoff doubled in the third, moved to third on a sacrifice bunt, and scored on Polanco's sac fly that made it 3–0 Cardinals. The D'Backs scored a run in the eighth on Danny Bautista's groundout off of Steve Kline with runners on second and third (the run charged to Williams), but an errant throw to first by pitcher Miguel Batista in the ninth on Kerry Robinson's ground ball with runners on second and third gave the Cardinals that run back. Williams pitched seven excellent innings, and Steve Kline got the save in the bottom of the ninth to even the series.

=== Game 3 ===
October 12, 2001 7:15 pm (CDT) at Busch Stadium (II) in St. Louis, Missouri 66 °F (19 °C), cloudy
Team	1	2	3	4	5	6	7	8	9	R	H	E
Arizona	0	0	0	0	0	1	4	0	0	5	9	0
St. Louis	0	0	0	2	0	0	1	0	0	3	6	0
WP: Miguel Batista (1–0) LP: Mike Matthews (0–1) Sv: Byung-hyun Kim (1); Home runs: AZ: Luis Gonzalez (1), Craig Counsell (1); STL: Jim Edmonds (1), Édgar Rentería (1); Attendance: 52,273; Boxscore

In Game 3, Batista returned to the mound to start for Arizona. Opposing him would be Darryl Kile. Both pitchers kept the game scoreless until Jim Edmonds's two-run homer in the bottom of the fourth gave the Cardinals a 2–0 lead. Luis Gonzalez responded with a homer off the right field pole to make it a one-run game in the sixth. Then the Diamondbacks came back in dramatic fashion. After Kile allowed a leadoff walk in the top of the seventh, Mike Matthews came on in relief and allowed a one-out single before Greg Colbrunn tied the game with an RBI single. A fielder's choice put two men on for eventual NLCS MVP Craig Counsell. He then hit a three-run home run to right that put the D'Backs up 5–2. Rentería's home run in the bottom of the inning off of Brian Anderson made it 5–3, but Byung-hyun Kim closed the door in the ninth despite allowing a leadoff single and subsequent walk to earn the save. Tragically, this wound up being Kile's final playoff game.

=== Game 4 ===
October 13, 2001 3:48 pm (CDT) at Busch Stadium (II) in St. Louis, Missouri 64 °F (18 °C), Overcast
Team	1	2	3	4	5	6	7	8	9	R	H	E
Arizona	1	0	0	0	0	0	0	0	0	1	6	0
St. Louis	1	1	2	0	0	0	0	0	X	4	7	1
WP: Bud Smith (1–0) LP: Albie Lopez (0–1) Sv: Steve Kline (2); Home runs: AZ: None; STL: Jim Edmonds (2), Fernando Viña (1); Attendance: 52,194; Boxscore

Originally slated for a 12:12 pm first pitch, the game was delayed 3 hours & 36 minutes due to inclement weather.

Albie Lopez looked to close the door on the Cards. Opposing him would be rookie Bud Smith. Smith got into trouble in the top of the first when he allowed two walks and Steve Finley singled home a run to make it 1–0 Diamondbacks. However, Fernando Viña hit a leadoff single, stole second, moved to third on a groundout and scored on J. D. Drew's single to tie the game in the bottom half of the inning. Then Jim Edmonds's home run in the bottom of the second put the Cardinals up for good. Fernando Viña's two-run homer after a walk in the third gave the Cardinals insurance. Smith pitched five innings, allowing just one run, for the win. Both bullpens held the other team to nothing for the rest of the game as the series was once again tied.

=== Game 5 ===
October 14, 2001 5:15 pm (MST) at Bank One Ballpark in Phoenix, Arizona 72 °F (22 °C), roof closed
Team	1	2	3	4	5	6	7	8	9	R	H	E
St. Louis	0	0	0	0	0	0	0	1	0	1	6	1
Arizona	0	0	0	1	0	0	0	0	1	2	9	1
WP: Curt Schilling (2–0) LP: Steve Kline (0–1); Home runs: STL: J. D. Drew (1); AZ: Reggie Sanders (1); Attendance: 42,810; Boxscore

In the decisive Game 5, Matt Morris once again faced Curt Schilling. Both pitchers were on their game, allowing only one run throughout the entire game. Morris was the first to falter in the bottom of the fourth when he gave up a solo home run to Reggie Sanders, but that was the only run he allowed in eight innings. Schilling was masterful and was four outs away from winning the series. He was working on a four-hit shutout when J. D. Drew tied the game with a home run in the eighth. Schilling pitched a complete game and in the ninth, a leadoff double by Matt Williams off of Dave Veres put the winning run on base. A sacrifice bunt by Damian Miller put pinch runner Midre Cummings on third. Steve Kline relieved Veres and after Greg Colbrunn was walked intentionally, Cummings tried to steal home on the squeeze play attempt and got caught. Colbrunn went to second and Danny Bautista came on to pinch run. Then Tony Womack delivered the series winning single to left field. The Diamondbacks won their first postseason series ever and advanced to their first ever NLCS.

=== Composite box ===
2001 NLDS (3–2): Arizona Diamondbacks over St. Louis Cardinals

Team	1	2	3	4	5	6	7	8	9	R	H	E
Arizona Diamondbacks	1	0	0	1	1	1	4	1	1	10	37	4
St. Louis Cardinals	3	1	3	2	0	0	1	1	1	12	29	3
Total attendance: 231,321 Average attendance: 46,264

== Media coverage ==
For the first and only time, Fox Family and Fox carried the National League Division Series, with Kenny Albert and Rod Allen calling the action of Game 1 and Game 2 of the Atlanta–Houston series for Fox Family, while Mel Proctor and Rod Allen called the action of Game 3 of the Atlanta–Houston series for Fox. Fox Family and Fox carried the National League Division Series, with Thom Brennaman (himself a Diamondbacks broadcaster) and Steve Lyons calling the action of Game 1 and Game 2 of the Arizona–St. Louis series for Fox Family, while Joe Buck and Tim McCarver called the action of Game 3, Game 4 and Game 5 of the Arizona–St. Louis series for Fox Family (Games 3–4), and Fox (Game 5). ESPN Radio provided national radio coverage for the fourth consecutive year, with Wayne Hagin and Buck Showalter calling the action of the Atlanta–Houston series, while Charley Steiner and Dave Campbell called the action of the Arizona–St. Louis series.

Locally, the Arizona–St. Louis portion of the 2001 NLDS was called on KTAR-AM in Phoenix by Greg Schulte, Jeff Munn, Rod Allen (Games 4–5) and Jim Traber, and on KMOX-AM in St. Louis by Jack Buck (Games 3–4), Mike Shannon and Dan McLaughlin (Games 1–2, 5), while the Atlanta–Houston portion of the 2001 NLDS was called on WSB-AM in Atlanta by Pete Van Wieren, Skip Caray, Don Sutton and Joe Simpson, and on KTRH-AM in Houston by Milo Hamilton and Alan Ashby.
