= 2001 National League Championship Series =

Team (Wins)	Managers	Season
Arizona Diamondbacks (4)	Bob Brenly	92–70 (.568), GA: 2
Atlanta Braves (1)	Bobby Cox	88–74 (.543), GA: 2
- Dates: October 16–21
- MVP: Craig Counsell (Arizona)
- Umpires: Jerry Crawford, Jeff Kellogg, Ángel Hernández, Mike Reilly, Gerry Davis, Tim McClelland

Broadcast
- Television: Fox (United States); MLB International (International)
- TV announcers: Joe Buck and Tim McCarver (Games 1–2); Thom Brennaman and Steve Lyons (Games 3–5) (Fox); Gary Thorne and Ken Singleton (MLB International)
- Radio: ESPN
- Radio announcers: Charley Steiner and Dave Campbell
- NLDS: Atlanta Braves over Houston Astros (3–0); Arizona Diamondbacks over St. Louis Cardinals (3–2)

The 2001 National League Championship Series (NLCS) was a best-of-seven playoff series in Major League Baseball’s 2001 postseason pitting the second-seeded Arizona Diamondbacks against the third-seeded Atlanta Braves for the National League pennant. The Diamondbacks held home-field advantage due to having a better regular season record.

The Diamondbacks won the series in five games and went on to defeat the New York Yankees in seven games to win the World Series.

== Background ==
The Diamondbacks won their division with a 92–70 record, which was good enough for the second seed in the National League. One strength of their team was the pitching duo of Randy Johnson and Curt Schilling, who led the team in wins above replacement. The primary weapon for Arizona on offense was Luis Gonzalez, who belted 57 home runs during the season. The Diamondbacks had outlasted the wild card St. Louis Cardinals in the NLDS to reach their first NLCS.

The Atlanta Braves won their tenth straight division title, but it had not been by a wide margin in 2001. They struggled to an 88–74 record, their worst since 1990, and were the third seed in the National League. Greg Maddux had another big season for the Braves, winning 17 games. Chipper Jones was the leader of the Atlanta offense, batting .330 during the season to go along with his 38 home runs. After their embarrassing defeat to the St. Louis Cardinals in the 2000 NLDS, the underdog Braves blitzed the top-seeded Houston Astros in the 2001 NLDS, sweeping them in three games.

== Summary ==
=== Arizona Diamondbacks vs. Atlanta Braves ===
Arizona won the series, 4–1.

Game	Date	Score	Location	Time	Attendance
1	October 16	Atlanta Braves – 0, Arizona Diamondbacks – 2	Bank One Ballpark	2:44	37,729
2	October 17	Atlanta Braves – 8, Arizona Diamondbacks – 1	Bank One Ballpark	2:54	49,334
3	October 19	Arizona Diamondbacks – 5, Atlanta Braves – 1	Turner Field	2:59	41,624
4	October 20	Arizona Diamondbacks – 11, Atlanta Braves – 4	Turner Field	3:47	42,291
5	October 21	Arizona Diamondbacks – 3, Atlanta Braves – 2	Turner Field	3:13	35,652

== Game summaries ==
=== Game 1 ===
October 16, 2001 1:20 pm (MST) at Bank One Ballpark in Phoenix, Arizona 72 °F (22 °C), roof closed
Team	1	2	3	4	5	6	7	8	9	R	H	E
Atlanta	0	0	0	0	0	0	0	0	0	0	3	1
Arizona	1	0	0	0	1	0	0	0	X	2	8	0
WP: Randy Johnson (1–0) LP: Greg Maddux (0–1); Attendance: 37,729; Boxscore

The 2001 NLCS began with a pitching matchup of multiple-Cy Young Award winners Randy Johnson and Greg Maddux. Reggie Sanders plated a run in the first with a single to give Arizona a 1–0 lead. The Diamondbacks went ahead 2–0 after Luis Gonzalez drove in Craig Counsell, who doubled with two outs with a single in the fifth. Though Maddux went seven innings, Johnson pitched a complete-game three-hit shutout with 11 strikeouts.

=== Game 2 ===
October 17, 2001 5:20 pm (MST) at Bank One Ballpark in Phoenix, Arizona 89 °F (32 °C), roof open; sunny
Team	1	2	3	4	5	6	7	8	9	R	H	E
Atlanta	1	0	0	0	0	0	2	5	0	8	8	0
Arizona	0	0	0	0	0	1	0	0	0	1	5	1
WP: Tom Glavine (1–0) LP: Miguel Batista (0–1); Home runs: ATL: Marcus Giles (1), Javy López (1), B. J. Surhoff (1); AZ: None; Attendance: 49,334; Boxscore

The Braves responded to Johnson's dominating performance with one of their own from Tom Glavine. Marcus Giles led the game off with a home run for the Braves off Miguel Batista. Glavine went seven innings, scattering five hits and giving up one run in the sixth when Reggie Sanders walked with two outs and scored two batters later on Matt Williams's single. In the top of the seventh, Andruw Jones walked two outs off of Batista before Javy López hit a two-run homer to make it 3–1. Atlanta scored five runs in the eighth with two outs to break the game open. Julio Franco singled and Chipper Jones walked off of Mike Morgan before both scored on Brian Jordan's double. Greg Swindell relieved Morgan and allowed a two-run home run to B. J. Surhoff. Bobby Witt relieved Swindell and allowed back-to-back singles to Jones and Lopez before Rey Sanchez's RBI single made it 8–1 Braves. Steve Karsay and John Smoltz pitched perfect eighth and ninth, respectively as the Braves' win tied the series 1–1 heading to Atlanta.

=== Game 3 ===
October 19, 2001 8:20 pm (EDT) at Turner Field in Atlanta, Georgia 61 °F (16 °C), cloudy
Team	1	2	3	4	5	6	7	8	9	R	H	E
Arizona	0	0	2	0	3	0	0	0	0	5	9	1
Atlanta	0	0	0	1	0	0	0	0	0	1	4	1
WP: Curt Schilling (1–0) LP: John Burkett (0–1); Attendance: 41,624; Boxscore

Curt Schilling, who earned an MVP award in the 1993 NLCS against the Braves, got the start in Game 3 in Atlanta. Braves starter John Burkett gave up two runs in the third when Steve Finley doubled with two on. That would be all Schilling would need, as he, much like Johnson, controlled the Braves lineup. Atlanta got a run in the fourth when Marcus Giles hit a leadoff double and scored on Chipper Jones's one-out single, but with the bases loaded with one out, Steve Reed relieved Burkett and a Chipper Jones error at third base on Matt Williams's groundball allowed two runs to score. Mike Remlinger relieved Reed and allowed an RBI single to Finley. Ahead 5–1, Schilling cruised the rest of the way, tossing a complete game and striking out 12 men.

=== Game 4 ===
October 20, 2001 7:50 pm (EDT) at Turner Field in Atlanta, Georgia 68 °F (20 °C), clear
Team	1	2	3	4	5	6	7	8	9	R	H	E
Arizona	0	0	4	2	0	0	0	1	4	11	12	0
Atlanta	1	1	0	0	0	0	1	1	0	4	13	4
WP: Brian Anderson (1–0) LP: Greg Maddux (0–2) Sv: Byung-Hyun Kim (1); Home runs: AZ: Luis Gonzalez (1); ATL: Andruw Jones (1); Attendance: 42,291; Boxscore

Looking to tie the series, Bobby Cox started Greg Maddux on short rest. For two innings, the move appeared to work. The Braves struck first off of Diamondback starter Albie Lopez when Marcus Giles walked to lead off the first and scored on RBI double by Chipper Jones. Next inning, a lead off homer by Andruw Jones made it 2–0 Braves. However, the wheels came off for Atlanta in the third when two errors, a single, and fielder's choice allowed Arizona to load the bases with one out. Steve Finley's single scored two with Finley going to second on another error, then Matt Williams and Mark Grace hit back-to-back RBI singles to put Arizona up 4–2. Manager Bob Brenly went for the jugular in the fourth, pinch hitting David Dellucci for Lopez to lead off the inning. Dellucci singled, then Tony Womack singled before Craig Counsell hit a two-run double to left to make it 6–2. Brian Anderson, who picked up the win, pitched 3 1/3. The Braves scored in the seventh off of Mike Morgan on Brian Jordan's RBI single with the run charged to Anderson, but in the eighth, Arizona got the run back off of Steve Karsay when Womack singled with one out and scored on Counsell's double. The Braves loaded the bases in the bottom half on three straight leadoff singles off of Miguel Batista, but Byung-Hyun Kim in relief allowed just one run on Javy López's double play. In the ninth, Jason Marquis struck out the first two men he faced, but a walk and error was followed by Counsell's RBI single. Luis Gonzalez's three-run homer broke the game open at 11–4 Arizona, all four runs unearned. Kim pitched a perfect bottom of the ninth as the win put Arizona firmly in control of the series, ahead three games to one with a rested Randy Johnson set to pitch.

=== Game 5 ===
October 21, 2001 7:50 pm (EDT) at Turner Field in Atlanta, Georgia 70 °F (21 °C), clear
Team	1	2	3	4	5	6	7	8	9	R	H	E
Arizona	0	0	0	1	2	0	0	0	0	3	6	1
Atlanta	0	0	0	1	0	0	1	0	0	2	7	1
WP: Randy Johnson (2–0) LP: Tom Glavine (1–1) Sv: Byung-Hyun Kim (2); Home runs: AZ: Erubiel Durazo (1); ATL: Julio Franco (1); Attendance: 35,652; Boxscore

Game 1 winner Randy Johnson and Game 2 winner Tom Glavine faced off as Arizona looked to advance to their first ever World Series appearance. Former Brave Danny Bautista broke a scoreless tie in the fourth by singling home Mark Grace. The Braves promptly tied the game when veteran Julio Franco led off the fourth with a home run, the first run Johnson had allowed the whole series. However, Arizona answered right back in the top of the fifth when Erubiel Durazo hit a two-out two-run blast off Glavine to make it 3–1, one run unearned. In the seventh, Franco added another RBI with a single that made it 3–2. However, Byung-Hyun Kim came into the game and kept the Braves from getting any closer. He pitched two scoreless innings and Arizona won its first National League pennant.

== Composite box ==
2001 NLCS (4–1): Arizona Diamondbacks over Atlanta Braves

Team	1	2	3	4	5	6	7	8	9	R	H	E
Arizona Diamondbacks	1	0	6	3	6	1	0	1	4	22	40	3
Atlanta Braves	2	1	0	2	0	0	4	6	0	15	35	7
Total attendance: 206,630 Average attendance: 41,326

== Media coverage ==
Fox carried the National League Division Series over its network with its top broadcast team, Joe Buck and Tim McCarver, calling the action of Game 1 and Game 2, and Thom Brennaman (himself a Diamondbacks broadcaster) and Steve Lyons calling the action of Game 3, Game 4 and Game 5. Game 5 of the 2001 NLCS was played at the same time as Game 4 of the 2001 ALCS and was a split national broadcast on Fox and Fox Sports Net. ESPN Radio provided national radio coverage for the fourth consecutive year, with Charley Steiner and Dave Campbell calling the action.

Locally, the NLCS was called on KTAR-AM in Phoenix by Greg Schulte, Jeff Munn, Rod Allen and Jim Traber, and on WSB-AM in Atlanta by Pete Van Wieren, Skip Caray, Don Sutton, and Joe Simpson.

== Aftermath ==
Arizona would continue to ride the duo of Randy Johnson and Curt Schilling to a World Series victory against the Yankees in a dramatic seven game series. The Diamondbacks, in their fourth season of existence, were the fastest expansion team to win a World Series, beating out the 1997 Florida Marlins, who had done it in their fifth season.

After dominating the National League in the 1990s (which included five consecutive victories in the NLDS to go with eight total NLCS trips and one World Series win in 1995), this was the closest that Atlanta would get to going back to the World Series in the Bobby Cox era. The Braves returned to the postseason in 2002, 2003, 2004, and 2005, but they did not get past the National League Division Series. By their 2004 and 2005 teams, the Braves gave significant playing time to their younger players and had moved on from star veterans such as Tom Glavine, Greg Maddux, Gary Sheffield, and Javy López. Cox retired in 2010, leading managers all-time in multiple categories, such as playoff appearances, 100-win seasons (shared at six with John McGraw), and ejections, and was inducted into the National Baseball Hall of Fame in 2014. Game 5 also marked the final time that Turner Field hosted either a League Championship Series or a World Series game. Atlanta would not win another playoff series until 2020 and would not win another World Series until 2021.

Arizona would not return an NLCS until 2007, which by this time, they did not have any players from the 2001 team. They did not win another pennant until 2023 when they upset the Phillies in seven games.
