= Rod Barajas =

American baseball player and coach (born 1975)

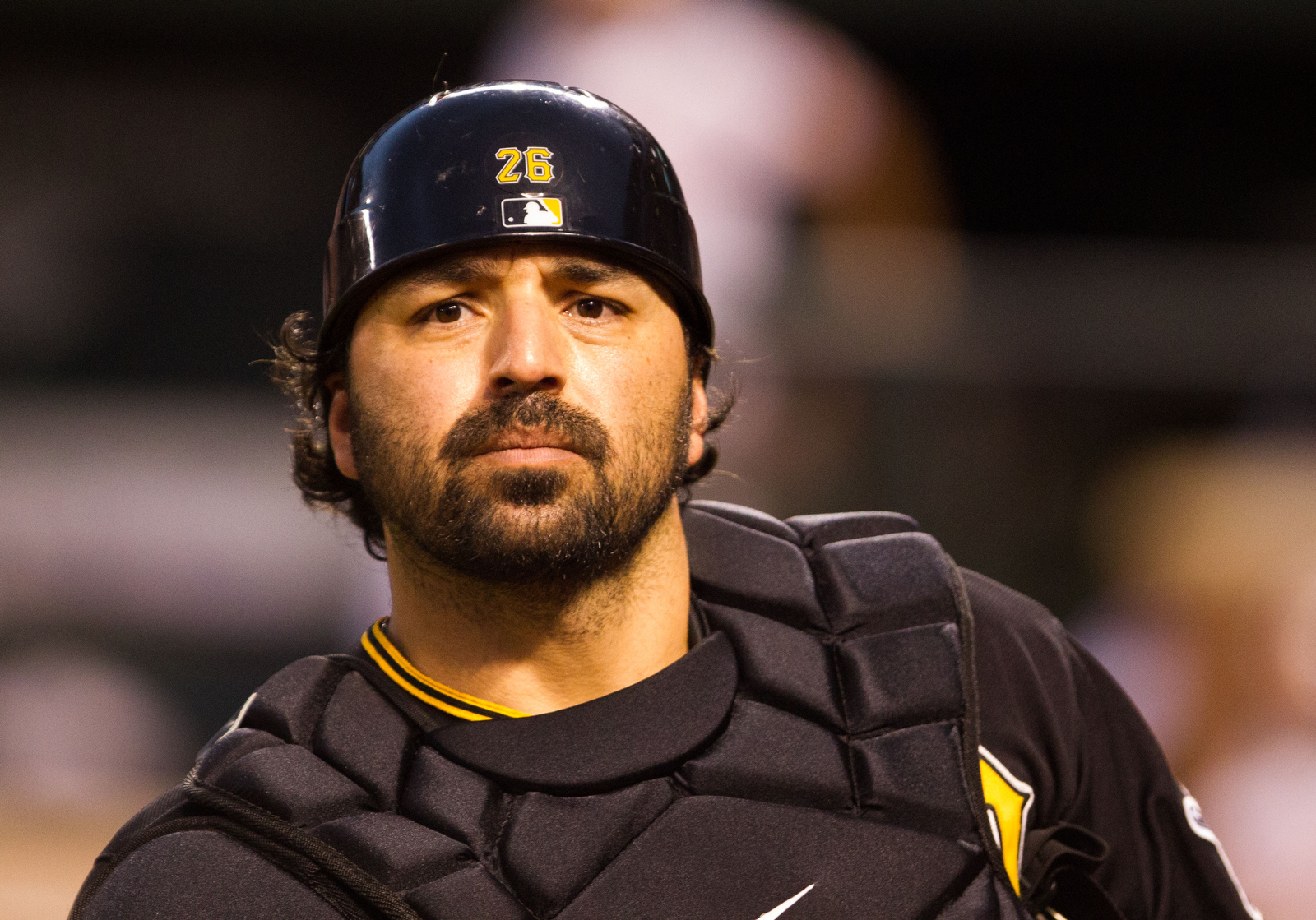
- Barajas with the Pittsburgh Pirates in 2012

Texas Rangers – No. 88
- Catcher / Coach
- Born: September 5, 1975 (age 51); Ontario, California, U.S.
- Batted: Right Threw: Right

MLB debut
- September 25, 1999, for the Arizona Diamondbacks

Last MLB appearance
- October 3, 2012, for the Pittsburgh Pirates

MLB statistics
- Batting average: .235
- Home runs: 136
- Runs batted in: 480
- Managerial record: 1–7
- Winning %: .125
- Stats at Baseball Reference

Teams
- As player: Arizona Diamondbacks (1999–2003); Texas Rangers (2004–2006); Philadelphia Phillies (2007); Toronto Blue Jays (2008–2009); New York Mets (2010); Los Angeles Dodgers (2010–2011); Pittsburgh Pirates (2012); As manager: San Diego Padres (2019); As coach: San Diego Padres (2019–2021); Miami Marlins (2023–2024); Texas Rangers (2026–present)

Career highlights and awards
- World Series champion (2001)

Rodrigo Richard Barajas (born September 5, 1975) is an American former professional baseball catcher and current quality control coach for the Texas Rangers of Major League Baseball (MLB). Barajas served as the interim manager for the San Diego Padres after Andy Green's firing on September 21, 2019. As a player in MLB, he played for the Arizona Diamondbacks, Texas Rangers, Philadelphia Phillies, Toronto Blue Jays, New York Mets, Los Angeles Dodgers, and Pittsburgh Pirates. With the Diamondbacks, he won the 2001 World Series over the then reigning, three-time world champion New York Yankees. Barajas also played for the Mexico national baseball team.

== Professional career ==
=== Arizona Diamondbacks ===
Barajas was originally signed by the Arizona Diamondbacks as an amateur free agent on December 23, 1996. He was immediately sent to the minor leagues. He played for the Lethbridge Black Diamonds of the Pioneer League (Rk), the lowest level of the minors as a rookie, but excelled, hitting .337 in 51 games. He played his way to the top of the minor leagues in the Diamondbacks' system.

Barajas made his Major League debut for the Diamondbacks on September 25, 1999, against the San Francisco Giants. He was hitless in three at-bats in that game. He hit his first career home run in the last game of the season on October 3, 1999, against the San Diego Padres, a line-drive to left-center field off of Heath Murray. He played in a total of 10 games with the Diamondbacks in 1999 and 2000. He homered twice and did not commit a single error while playing catcher.

Barajas struggled at the plate in 2001, hitting just .160 in 51 games, though he only committed one error while serving as a backup for Damian Miller. He was on the Diamondbacks' World Series roster. In Game 5 of the World Series, he homered off Mike Mussina of the New York Yankees.

Barajas continued to serve as a backup for Miller in 2002. In 70 games, he hit .234 with three home runs and 23 RBI. Despite the poor offensive numbers in 2002, Barajas did not commit a single error behind the plate. In 2003, he pulled off similar numbers in 80 games, batting just .218 with three home runs and 28 RBI. He became a free agent after the season.

=== Texas Rangers ===
Before 2004, Barajas had never played more than 80 games, hit more than three home runs, or batted higher than .234 in a full season. In January 2004, the Texas Rangers signed Barajas to a minor league contract and invited him to spring training. He won the backup catcher's job during the spring and made the team's Opening Day roster. After starting catcher Gerald Laird was sidelined with a sprained thumb, Barajas took over the starting job with Laird and Danny Ardoin serving as his backups. At the end of the season, he established career highs in games played (108), home runs (15), RBIs (58), and batting average (.249). Barajas also played some first base when needed, compiling ten career games there as a defensive replacement, through the 2007 season. In 2005, he hit .254 with a career-high 21 home runs and 60 RBI in 120 games, serving as the starter once again. In 2006, he split time with Laird at catcher, and finished the season batting .256 with 11 home runs and 41 RBI in 97 games.

=== Philadelphia Phillies ===
In November 2006, Barajas was originally going to sign a two-year, $5.25 million deal with the Toronto Blue Jays, but he backed out of the deal at the last minute, claiming he never approved the contract, and fired both of his agents. On December 18, 2006, it was announced that he had reached an agreement with the Philadelphia Phillies for a one-year, $2.5 million deal, worth less than half of the Blue Jays' offer a month earlier. Barajas claimed he was happy with the new deal and had no regrets. He shared time behind the plate with Carlos Ruiz, and batted .230 with four home runs and 10 RBI in 48 games with the Phillies. On October 11, 2007, the Phillies declined his option, making him a free agent.

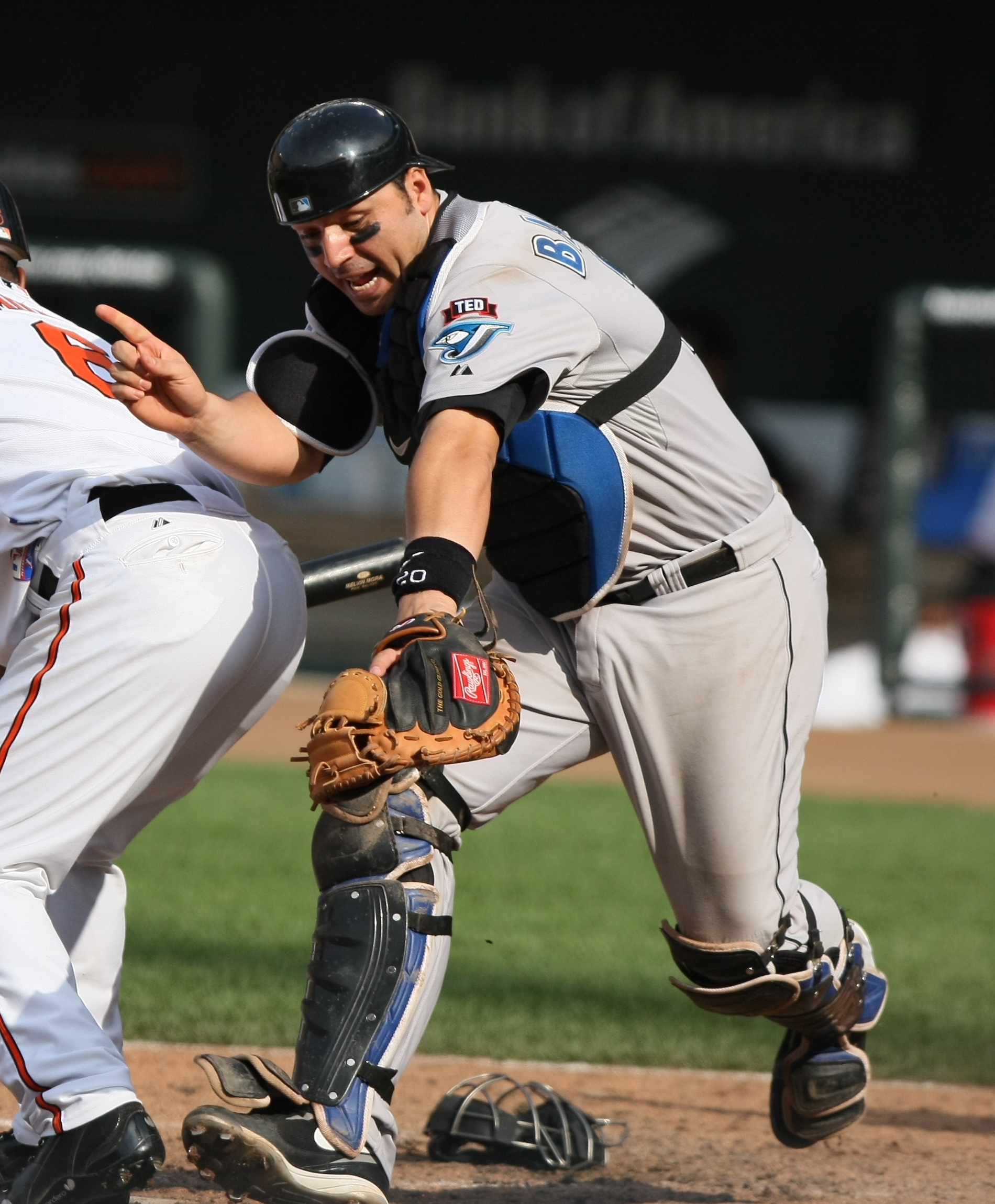
Barajas with the Toronto Blue Jays in 2009

=== Toronto Blue Jays ===
On January 24, 2008, Barajas signed a one-year, $1.2 million deal with the Toronto Blue Jays, the team he backed out of a contract with the previous off-season, this time as the backup to incumbent catcher Gregg Zaun. Zaun had signed a two-year deal with the team only after negotiations with Barajas fell apart. Blue Jays general manager J. P. Ricciardi said he had no hard feelings towards Barajas. Zaun was supposed to be the starting catcher, but due to his poor offensive numbers and overall difficulties, manager Cito Gaston made Barajas the starter after he took over for John Gibbons, and he continued in that role in 2009. He finished the 2008 season batting .249 with 11 home runs, 49 RBIs, a .294 on-base percentage, and a .410 slugging percentage over 104 games.

Barajas finished the 2009 season batting .226 with 19 home runs and a career high 71 RBI in 125 games.

=== New York Mets ===
On February 24, 2010, Barajas signed a one-year, $1 million contract with the New York Mets and was named the opening day catcher. On May 7, 2010, he hit the first walk-off home run in the history of Citi Field, giving him three multi-home run games in his first five weeks as a Met. Barajas became the first Met catcher to hit 12 or more home runs since Mike Piazza's last year with the Mets in 2005.

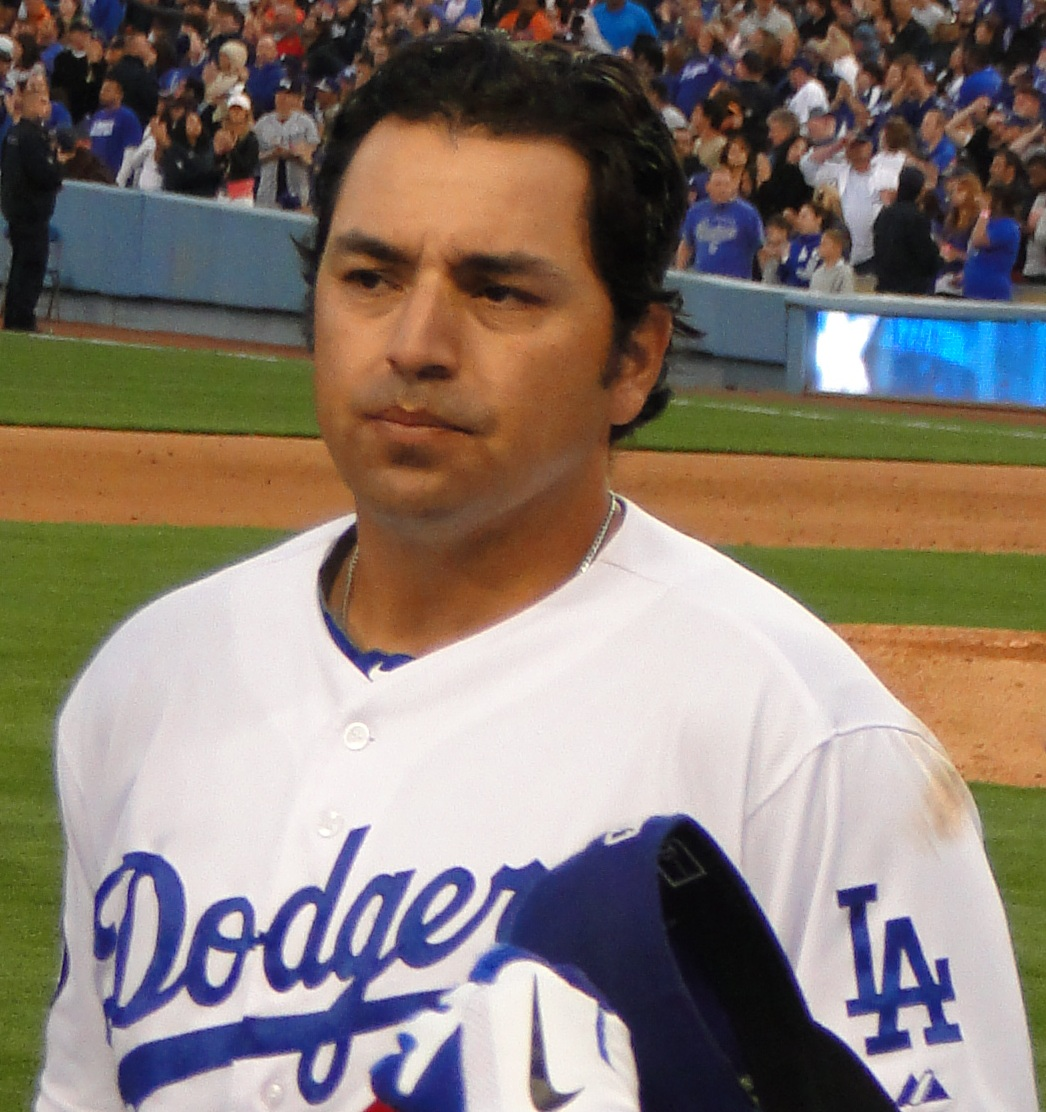
Barajas with the Los Angeles Dodgers in 2011

=== Los Angeles Dodgers ===
On August 22, 2010, Barajas was claimed off waivers by the Los Angeles Dodgers and acquired for cash considerations.

In his first game with Los Angeles against the Milwaukee Brewers, Barajas hit two doubles and a three-run home run. Barajas became the first Dodger to hit three extra-base hits in his first game with the club. In his first home game in Dodger Stadium, Barajas hit a home run in the fifth inning.

Barajas appeared in 25 games with the Dodgers in 2010, hitting .297 with five home runs and 13 RBI. On December 3, 2010, he re-signed with the Dodgers on a one-year, $3.25 million deal for 2011.

In 2011, he played in 98 games with the Dodgers, hitting .230 with 16 home runs and 47 RBI. He became a free agent after the season.

=== Pittsburgh Pirates ===
On November 10, 2011, Barajas signed a one-year contract with a club option for 2013 with the Pittsburgh Pirates. He batted .206 with 11 home runs and 31 RBI in 104 games as a Pirate in 2012. The Pirates declined his 2013 option on October 31, 2012.

=== Arizona Diamondbacks (second stint) ===
On February 8, 2013, Barajas signed a minor league contract with the Arizona Diamondbacks. Barajas was released by the organization prior to the start of the season on March 25.

== Managing and coaching career ==
Before the 2014 season, Barajas was named manager of the Arizona League Padres. Barajas replaced Jamie Quirk as the manager of the San Antonio Missions on June 17, 2015, after Quirk was promoted to coach at Triple-A El Paso. Because the game was postponed by rain, his debut occurred with a double-header on June 18 against the Midland RockHounds. He was later the manager for the El Paso Chihuahuas Triple–A baseball team.

In October 2018, Barajas was named as the bench coach for the San Diego Padres. On September 21, 2019, Barajas was named the interim manager for the Padres following the team's firing of Andy Green. Barajas managed the Padres' last eight games of the season, going 1–7. He was named the Padres' catching and quality control coach prior to the 2020 season.

On November 27, 2022, Barajas was hired by the Miami Marlins to serve as the team's quality assurance coach for the 2023 season. On October 2, 2024, Barajas was fired alongside the entirety of the Marlins coaching staff.

Barajas was a coach for the Los Angeles Angels' Double-A affiliate, the Rocket City Trash Pandas in 2025.

Barajas was named the quality control coach for the Texas Rangers prior to the 2026 season.

Team	From	To	Regular season record			Post–season record		
Team	From	To	W	L	Win %	W	L	Win %
San Diego Padres	2019		1	7	.125	DNQ		

== Personal life ==
Barajas is of Mexican descent. His mother and father are from Baja California, respectively. He and his wife Stacie have four sons, Andrew, Bryce, Rod Jr. and Jace, and four daughters, Aunalilia, Aubrielle, Starlette and Emiko. Rod attended Santa Fe High School, Santa Fe Springs, California and Cerritos Community College. He lived in Norwalk, California for most of his childhood.
