= List of Arizona Diamondbacks broadcasters =

This article is a list of Arizona Diamondbacks broadcasters. The following is a historical list of the all-time Arizona Diamondbacks broadcasters:

Television Analysts

- Rod Allen, Television Analyst (1998–2002)
- Bob Brenly, Television Analyst (1998–2000, 2013–present)
- Joe Garagiola, Television Analyst (1998–2012)
- Al McCoy, Television Analyst (1998)
- Luis Gonzalez, Television Analyst (2012–present)
- Mark Grace, Television Analyst (2004–2012)
- Steve Lyons, Television Analyst (2003–2004)
- Jim Traber, Television Analyst (2001–2003)

Television Play-by-Play

- Chris Garagiola, Television Play-by-Play (2026–present)
- Steve Berthiaume, Television Play-by-Play (2013–2026)
- Thom Brennaman, Television Play-by-Play (1998–2006)
- Greg Schulte, Radio and Television Play-by-Play (1998–2023)
- Daron Sutton, Television Play-by-Play (2006–2012)

Radio

- Chris Garagiola, Fill-In/Secondary radio play-by-play (2022–2026). Primary Radio Play-by-Play (2024–2026)
- Tom Candiotti, Radio Analyst (2006–present)
- Miguel Quintana, Spanish Radio Play-by-Play (1998–present)
- Oscar Soria, Spanish Television and Radio Analyst (2000–present)
- Richard Saenz, Spanish Radio Analyst (2001–present)
- Mike Ferrin, Fill-In/Secondary radio play-by-play (2016–2021, 2023–present)
- Cole Tucker, Fill-In/Secondary Radio Analyst (2026–present)
- Jeff Munn, Fill-in/Secondary Radio Play-by-Play (2001–2015)
- Rod Allen, Radio Analyst (1998–2002)
- Thom Brennaman, Radio Play-by-Play (1998–2006)
- Ken Phelps, Radio Analyst (2004)
- Greg Schulte, Radio Play-by-Play (1998–2023)
- Victor Rojas, Radio Analyst (2003)
- Jim Traber, Radio Analyst (2001–2003)

== See also ==
- List of current Major League Baseball broadcasters
