= The Whammer =

The Whammer is a nickname that may refer to:

- Jim Traber, major league baseball player and sportscaster
- "The Whammer" (WordGirl), a villain in the TV series WordGirl
- Walter 'The Whammer' Whambold, a character in the novel The Natural
