= Greg Swindell =

American baseball player (born 1965)

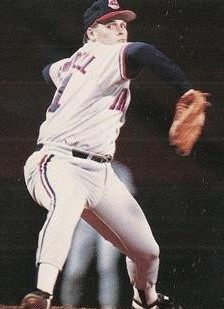
- Swindell in 1987
- Pitcher
- Born: January 2, 1965 (age 61); Fort Worth, Texas, U.S.
- Batted: Right Threw: Left

MLB debut
- August 21, 1986, for the Cleveland Indians

Last MLB appearance
- September 23, 2002, for the Arizona Diamondbacks

MLB statistics
- Win–loss record: 123–122
- Earned run average: 3.86
- Strikeouts: 1,542
- Stats at Baseball Reference

Teams
- Cleveland Indians (1986–1991); Cincinnati Reds (1992); Houston Astros (1993–1996); Cleveland Indians (1996); Minnesota Twins (1997–1998); Boston Red Sox (1998); Arizona Diamondbacks (1999–2002)

Career highlights and awards
- All-Star (1989); World Series champion (2001)

Member of the College

Baseball Hall of Fame
- Induction: 2008

Forest Gregory Swindell (born January 2, 1965) is an American former professional baseball player. He had a 17-year career in Major League Baseball as a left-handed pitcher from 1986 to 2002. He played for the Cleveland Indians, Minnesota Twins and Boston Red Sox of the American League and the Cincinnati Reds, Houston Astros and Arizona Diamondbacks of the National League. He was a member of the Diamondbacks team that defeated the New York Yankees to win the 2001 World Series.

== Early life ==
Swindell was born on January 2, 1965, to Tonii and Harold Swindell in Fort Worth, Texas. He was the youngest of four children, two sisters Treva and Chrystie and a brother Corky

He graduated from Sharpstown High School in 1983. The previous year, led his high school team to a Texas Class 5A state championship going 14–0 on the mound with a 0.65 ERA.

== Collegiate career ==
Swindell attended the University of Texas at Austin where he was a member of Sigma Nu fraternity. According to the Texas Longhorns media guide, he was one of the most decorated pitchers in school history, with a 43–8 record in 77 games and a 1.92 ERA. He made 50 starts, pitching 32 complete games and notching school records for shutouts (14) and strikeouts (501). He remains among the top 10 all-time in Longhorns history for ERA (10th), victories (3rd), innings (2nd), strikeouts (1st), appearances (4th), starts (3rd), complete games (3rd) and shutouts (1st). Swindell also had 13 career saves, which ranks sixth at UT and the top two single-season strikeout totals in UT history (204 in 1985 and 180 in 1986). He helped UT capture three straight Southwest Conference titles, post at least 51 wins during each of his three seasons, and finish second at the College World Series in 1984 and 1985.

In 1985, he had a 19–2 record and 1.67 ERA to go along with 15 complete games, six shutouts, and 204 strikeouts over 172 innings. He was named as the 1985 Baseball America National Player of the Year. He was selected a first-team All-American and All-Southwest Conference performer all three seasons and received Freshman All-America honors as well as Baseball America's Freshman of the Year Award in 1984. He also was a three time finalist for the Golden Spikes Award.

== Professional career ==
Cleveland selected him in the first round of the 1986 draft. The highly touted player was brought up almost immediately in 1986 and had moderate success, going 5–2 in his rookie year that saw him pitch nine games with one being a complete game while having a 4.23 ERA. In 1987, he started the season 3-8 and then injured his elbow. ending his season after 16 appearances (15 starts) with a 5.10 ERA.

He returned in 1988 and over the next four years displayed good form on a poor-performing Indians ballclub. His record from 1988 to 1991 was 52–43, posting an earned run average below 4.00 in three of the four seasons. His best season was 1988 when he went 18–14 with a 3.20 ERA. He struck out 180 and walked only 45. The next year, he was named to the American League All-Star team.

Swindell was traded to Cincinnati after the 1991 season and spent one year with the Reds. He returned to his native Texas as a free agent in 1992 with the Astros. At that point, his effectiveness began to wane. In three and a half years, he was 30–35 with an ERA over 4.00. After another stint with Cleveland in 1996, he signed with Minnesota where he reinvented himself as a reliever.

As a relief pitcher, Swindell pitched well for the Twins and Red Sox before he signed with Arizona. He was effective for the Diamondbacks and was a part of the 2001 championship squad. He faced eighteen total batters and allowed one run total through the whole postseason. In 2002, he retired from baseball after 17 seasons, finishing his career by getting only one out in four batters faced in two games of the 2002 NLDS, allowing four runs (one earned).

== Post-playing career ==
In 2004, Swindell was a volunteer assistant coach at Texas State University–San Marcos. In 2005, he returned to coach his alma mater, Texas Longhorns baseball, helping the team win its sixth NCAA College World Series crown.

In 2007 and 2008, Swindell served a second stint on the Texas Longhorns coaching staff, as the first base coach and helping with the pitchers.

Swindell was inducted into the College Baseball Hall of Fame in the class of 2008.

During the 2009 Major League Baseball season, Swindell worked as a post-game analyst on Fox Sports Arizona following Arizona Diamondbacks telecast. Since 2010, he has been on Thursday morning "Talk Baseball" segments on 1300 the zone (KVET-AM).

Since 2016, Swindell has served as the TV analyst for the Texas Longhorns on Longhorn Network.
