= Tony Womack =

American baseball player (born 1969)

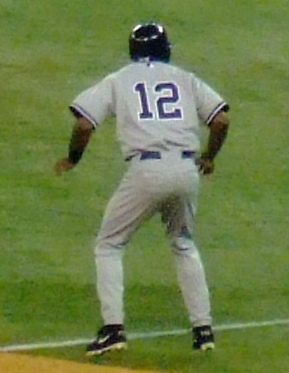
- Womack with the New York Yankees in 2005
- Second baseman / Shortstop
- Born: September 25, 1969 (age 56); Danville, Virginia, U.S.
- Batted: Left Threw: Right

MLB debut
- September 10, 1993, for the Pittsburgh Pirates

Last MLB appearance
- June 24, 2006, for the Chicago Cubs

MLB statistics
- Batting average: .273
- Home runs: 36
- Runs batted in: 368
- Stolen bases: 363
- Stats at Baseball Reference

Teams
- Pittsburgh Pirates (1993–1994, 1996–1998); Arizona Diamondbacks (1999–2003); Colorado Rockies (2003); Chicago Cubs (2003); St. Louis Cardinals (2004); New York Yankees (2005); Cincinnati Reds (2006); Chicago Cubs (2006)

Career highlights and awards
- All-Star (1997); World Series champion (2001); 3× NL stolen base leader (1997–1999)

Anthony Darrell Womack (born September 25, 1969) is an American former professional baseball player. He played in 13 seasons of Major League Baseball (MLB), with most of his career spent with the Pittsburgh Pirates and the Arizona Diamondbacks, then with several other teams during his last four years. A middle infielder, Womack was recognized for his speed, his base-stealing prowess, and his key hits in the 2001 playoffs, which led to the Diamondbacks' 2001 World Series win over the New York Yankees.

== Early life ==
Womack was born in Danville, Virginia. He is a graduate of Gretna High School in Gretna, Virginia, and Guilford College in Greensboro, North Carolina.

== Career ==
Womack was drafted by the Pittsburgh Pirates in 1991 MLB draft and became their everyday second baseman in 1997. That year, which was his first full year in the MLB, he played in his only All-Star Game and led the National League in stolen bases (60). In 1998, he again led the National League in stolen bases (58). After the 1998 season, he was traded to the Diamondbacks for two minor leaguers. The Diamondbacks moved Womack from second base to right field in 1999, then to shortstop in 2000. In 1999, Womack led the major leagues in stolen bases (72) which set a Diamondback record for most stolen bases in a season.

Womack was an important part of the Arizona Diamondbacks' world championship team in 2001, especially with two key base hits that both came in the bottom of the ninth inning of deciding games in the playoffs. Womack ended the first-round series with a walk-off single off the Cardinals' Steve Kline. Later, Womack set up Luis Gonzalez' famous game-winning single in Game 7 of the World Series with a game-tying one-out hit against the Yankees' Mariano Rivera. Womack's game-tying double was cited by The Wall Street Journal in 2006 as the most significant clutch hit in baseball history. Womack owns the Diamondbacks record for most stolen bases in a career (182).

Womack signed with the Red Sox but was traded to the Cardinals before the start of the 2004 season, and he was moved back to his original position at second base. After recovering from Tommy John surgery and a disappointing 2003 season, Womack batted a career-high .307 with five home runs, 38 runs batted in, and 26 stolen bases for the Cardinals.

After the 2004 season, Womack chose to sign with the New York Yankees, rather than wait for the Cardinals to offer him an extension. Despite turning in a productive 2004, Womack struggled with the Yankees in 2005, losing his starting second base job to Robinson Canó.

In 2006, after being released by the Reds, the Chicago Cubs signed him to a minor league deal and called him up on May 26. Womack was designated for assignment on June 30 and became a free agent on July 10. He received a non-roster invitation to spring training with the Washington Nationals for the 2007 season, but was released on March 8, ending his playing career.

== See also ==
- Arizona Diamondbacks award winners and league leaders
- List of Arizona Diamondbacks team records
- List of Major League Baseball annual stolen base leaders
- List of Major League Baseball annual triples leaders
- List of Major League Baseball career stolen bases leaders
- List of Major League Baseball stolen base records
