= Greg Colbrunn =

American baseball player (born 1969)

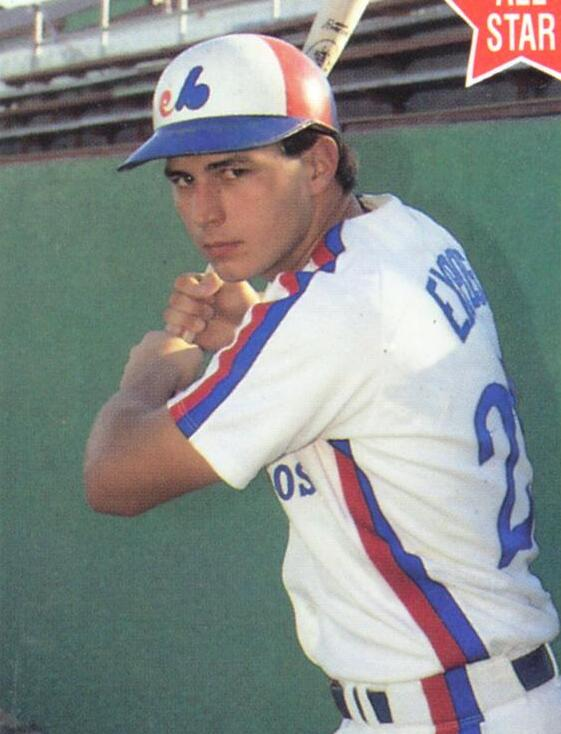
- Colbrunn with the Rockford Expos c. 1988
- First baseman
- Born: July 26, 1969 (age 57); Fontana, California, U.S.
- Batted: Right Threw: Right

MLB debut
- July 9, 1992, for the Montreal Expos

Last MLB appearance
- June 28, 2004, for the Arizona Diamondbacks

MLB statistics
- Batting average: .289
- Home runs: 98
- Runs batted in: 422
- Stats at Baseball Reference

Teams
- As player: Montreal Expos (1992–1993); Florida Marlins (1994–1996); Minnesota Twins (1997); Atlanta Braves (1997); Colorado Rockies (1998); Atlanta Braves (1998); Arizona Diamondbacks (1999–2002); Seattle Mariners (2003); Arizona Diamondbacks (2004); As coach: Boston Red Sox (2013–2014)

Career highlights and awards
- 2× World Series champion (2001, 2013)

Gregory Joseph Colbrunn (born July 26, 1969) is an American former Major League baseball player and hitting coach. Primarily a first baseman during his active career, the Fontana, California, native played in the Major Leagues for 13 seasons (1992–2004) and seven different teams. He threw and batted right-handed and was listed at 6 feet (1.8 m) tall and 190 pounds (86 kg). He served as the Boston Red Sox hitting coach during the 2013 and 2014 seasons.

Colbrunn graduated from Fontana High School and was selected by the Montreal Expos in the sixth round of the 1987 Major League Baseball draft, turning down a scholarship from Stanford University to begin his professional baseball career. Despite missing the entire 1991 season with an injury, he rose through the Montreal farm system and made his MLB debut with the Expos on July 9, 1992, and singled in his first at bat off Francisco Oliveras of the San Francisco Giants.

== Playing career ==
After his debut with Montreal, Colbrunn would also play for the Florida Marlins, Minnesota Twins, Colorado Rockies, Atlanta Braves, Arizona Diamondbacks and Seattle Mariners. He batted over .300 five times during his Major League career, and had his most successful seasons with the Marlins and Diamondbacks, exceeding the 100-games played mark in 1995, 1996 and 2000. He set personal bests in home runs (23) and runs batted in (89) for the 1995 Marlins, and amassed 146 hits for the Marlins in both 1995 and 1996. He batted .310 in 334 career games with the D-Backs, with a career-high .333 mark during part-time duty in 2002. He hit for the cycle on September 18, 2002, against the San Diego Padres.

Colbrunn was part of the Diamondbacks' victorious 2001 World Series team, starting at first base in Game 6 and collecting two singles in five at bats, with a base on balls, two runs scored and one RBI, in Arizona's 15–2 thrashing of the New York Yankees.

In his 13-season MLB career, Colbrunn batted .289; his 801 career hits included 155 doubles, 12 triples and 98 homers.

== Batting coach ==
After his playing career ended in 2005, Colbrunn became a coach in the Yankees' organization, serving as the hitting instructor for the Charleston RiverDogs of the Single-A South Atlantic League from 2007 to 2009 and 2011 to 2012. In 2010, Colbrunn managed the RiverDogs to a 65–74 (.468) record.

Then, following the 2012 season, Colbrunn joined the coaching staff of new Red Sox manager John Farrell as primary batting instructor. Under his guidance, the 2013 Red Sox led the Major Leagues in runs scored (853), runs per game (5.27), slugging percentage (.446), on-base percentage (.349), on-base plus slugging (.795), total bases (2,521) and extra-base hits (570). The Red Sox won the American League East Division title, the American League pennant and the 2013 World Series.

Colbrunn returned to Farrell's staff for 2014. On June 4, he was compelled to take a medical leave of absence after he suffered a cerebral hemorrhage during the Red Sox' road trip to Cleveland, Ohio, and was hospitalized in the Cleveland Clinic. He returned to his duties on a part-time basis on June 30. However, the 2014 Red Sox struggled offensively all season long, finishing at or near the bottom of the American League in almost every category, including runs scored (12th, with 634). After the 2014 season concluded, Colbrunn stepped down from his position with the Red Sox and declined another assignment within the organization.

Colbrunn, a resident of nearby Mount Pleasant, South Carolina, then returned to the Yankees' organization and the Charleston RiverDogs as their batting coach for 2015–16. In 2017, the Yankees promoted him to roving minor league hitting coordinator, but he returned to being the hitting coach for the 2019 Charleston team, in order to be closer to his family.

== See also ==
- List of Major League Baseball players to hit for the cycle

Achievements
Preceded by Craig Biggio	Hitting for the cycle September 18, 2002	Succeeded by Brad Wilkerson
Sporting positions
Preceded by Dave Magadan	Boston Red Sox hitting coach 2013–2014	Succeeded by Chili Davis
