= Damian Miller =

American baseball player (born 1969)

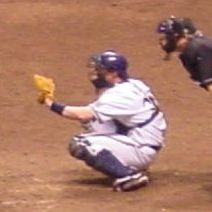
- Miller with the Milwaukee Brewers in 2005
- Catcher
- Born: October 13, 1969 (age 57); La Crosse, Wisconsin, U.S.
- Batted: Right Threw: Right

MLB debut
- August 10, 1997, for the Minnesota Twins

Last MLB appearance
- September 30, 2007, for the Milwaukee Brewers

MLB statistics
- Batting average: .262
- Home runs: 87
- Runs batted in: 406
- Stats at Baseball Reference

Teams
- Minnesota Twins (1997); Arizona Diamondbacks (1998–2002); Chicago Cubs (2003); Oakland Athletics (2004); Milwaukee Brewers (2005–2007)

Career highlights and awards
- All-Star (2002); World Series champion (2001)

Damian Donald Miller (born October 13, 1969) is an American former professional baseball catcher. He played in Major League Baseball (MLB) from 1997 to 2007 with five different teams, and was a member of the 2001 World Series champion Arizona Diamondbacks.

== Early life ==
Miller attended West Salem High School in West Salem, Wisconsin and was a student and a letterman in football, basketball and baseball. Miller graduated from West Salem High School in 1987.

== College and professional career ==
Miller attended Viterbo University in La Crosse, Wisconsin, and as a junior was named the NAIA District 14 Player of the Year and helped lead his team to the NAIA semifinals.

Miller is not a member of the Major League Baseball Players Association, as he was a replacement player during the 1994–95 Major League Baseball strike. These players are barred from joining the players' union. His name also does not appear on any official commemorative merchandise from the Arizona Diamondbacks' 2001 World Series win.

Through his career, Miller has also played for the Minnesota Twins, Arizona Diamondbacks (winning the 2001 World Series), Chicago Cubs and Oakland Athletics. In May 2000, he hit the first walk-off grand slam in the history of both Chase Field and the Diamondbacks, doing so in the bottom of the 12th inning against Orel Hershiser of the Los Angeles Dodgers. In Game 7 of the 2001 World Series he played a pivotal role in the 9th inning comeback against closer Mariano Rivera. With no outs and pinch runner David Dellucci on first base he bunted an 0-1 pitch right back to Rivera, who then attempted to throw to Derek Jeter at second base. Jeter would get tangled up in the legs of Dellucci who slid to break up the double play. Midre Cummings then pinch ran for Miller after Jay Bell’s failed sacrifice bunt turned fielder's choice. Cummings would score the tying run in the bottom of the ninth before Arizona ultimately won the World Series. The following year, Miller was named to the National League All-Star team.

On June 27, 2007, in a home game against the Houston Astros, Miller hit his second career walk-off home run in the bottom of the 11th inning to win the game for the Brewers. It was his first home run of the 2007 season. The walk-off came on La Crosse Day at Miller Park. In his next game, he recorded a franchise-tying seven runs batted in, which included a grand slam and a two-run home run.

After becoming a free agent after the 2007 season, Miller attracted interest from a couple of teams, but declined, saying the Brewers were the only team he wanted to play for.

== See also ==
- List of Major League Baseball replacement players
