= Midre Cummings =

American baseball player (born 1971)

- Outfielder
- Born: October 14, 1971 (age 55); St. Croix, Virgin Islands
- Batted: Left Threw: Right

MLB debut
- September 10, 1993, for the Pittsburgh Pirates

Last MLB appearance
- August 6, 2005, for the Baltimore Orioles

MLB statistics
- Batting average: .257
- Home runs: 22
- Runs batted in: 124

CPBL statistics
- Batting average: .214
- Home runs: 1
- Runs batted in: 1
- Stats at Baseball Reference

Teams
- Pittsburgh Pirates (1993–1997); Philadelphia Phillies (1997); Boston Red Sox (1998); Minnesota Twins (1999–2000); Boston Red Sox (2000); Arizona Diamondbacks (2001); Tampa Bay Devil Rays (2004); Baltimore Orioles (2005); La New Bears (2006)

Career highlights and awards
- World Series champion (2001)

Midre Almeric Cummings (/ˈmiːdreɪ/ MEE-dray; born October 14, 1971) is an American former professional baseball outfielder, who played in Major League Baseball (MLB) for the Pittsburgh Pirates (1993-1997), Philadelphia Phillies (1997), Boston Red Sox (1998 and 2000), Minnesota Twins (1999-2000), Arizona Diamondbacks (2001), Tampa Bay Devil Rays (2004), and Baltimore Orioles (2005). He spent 2006 with the La New Bears of the Chinese Professional Baseball League (CPBL).

== Amateur career ==
Cummings was born and raised in the United States Virgin Islands. Given that there was no high school baseball in the U.S. Virgin Islands, Cummings "played in a lot of open leagues, amateur leagues" sometimes against players as old as 21 when he was only 16. In 1987, he played for the St. Croix team which represented the U.S. Virgin Islands at the 1987 Senior League World Series. Cummings moved to Miami for his senior year of high school so that he could play baseball at Miami Edison Senior High School in the hopes of earning a college baseball scholarship. Cummings had a .400 batting average in his only season of high school baseball. Prior to the 1990 Major League Baseball draft, one talent evaluator said Cummings "could outrun Vince Coleman." Another said he was "the best outfielder to ever play in Dade County."

== Professional career ==
Cummings was drafted by the Minnesota Twins in the 1st round (29th overall) of the 1990 Major League Baseball draft. On March 17, 1992, he was traded by the Twins along with Denny Neagle to the Pirates for John Smiley, making his major league debut for the Pirates in 1993. In his fifth season with the Pirates, he was claimed off waivers by the Phillies on July 8. Cummings was released by the Phillies on February 24, 1998, and signed with the Cincinnati Reds three days later only to be claimed off waivers by the Red Sox in spring training. The Red Sox released him on March 30, 1999, and Cummings signed with the Twins on May 14. On August 31, 2000, he was traded to the Red Sox for minor leaguer Hector De Los Santos. Cummings became a free agent after the season and signed with the Arizona Diamondbacks.

Cummings helped the Diamondbacks win the 2001 World Series over the New York Yankees, scoring the tying run in the ninth inning during Game 7. It would be three years before Cummings played in the majors again, spending time in the Milwaukee Brewers and Chicago Cubs minor league systems from 2002-2003. On February 10, 2004, he signed with the Devil Rays and batted .278 in 54 at bats that year. He was released after the season and signed with the Baltimore Orioles, but got only two at bats that year and retired after the season.

Cummings signed with the La New Bears of the Chinese Professional Baseball League for the 2006 season.
