= Danny Bautista =

Dominican baseball player (born 1972)

- Outfielder
- Born: May 24, 1972 (age 54); Santo Domingo, Dominican Republic
- Batted: Right Threw: Right

MLB debut
- September 15, 1993, for the Detroit Tigers

Last MLB appearance
- September 28, 2004, for the Arizona Diamondbacks

MLB statistics
- Batting average: .272
- Home runs: 62
- Runs batted in: 319
- Stats at Baseball Reference

Teams
- Detroit Tigers (1993–1996); Atlanta Braves (1996–1998); Florida Marlins (1999–2000); Arizona Diamondbacks (2000–2004)

Career highlights and awards
- World Series champion (2001)

Daniel Bautista Alcántara (born May 24, 1972) is a Dominican former Major League Baseball (MLB) outfielder.

Bautista was signed by the Detroit Tigers in 1989. In 1993, he joined the major leagues with the Tigers. Although he hit for an average of .331 his first season as a Tiger, his power numbers there were not spectacular, and his batting average as a member of the Tigers decreased considerably over the next four seasons.

In 1996, he was traded to the Atlanta Braves for a minor leaguer. He played three seasons there as a reserve outfielder, but he also failed to produce good offensive numbers, his best batting average as a Brave being .250 in 1998. His most notable moment as a Brave may have been on June 27, 1996, when a pitch by Jeff Parrett hit him in the face and broke his eye socket, sending him to the hospital and ending his season.

He produced somewhat better offensive numbers as a member of the Florida Marlins in 1999, hitting for an average of .288. In 2000, he continued his improvement in offensive numbers, hitting double digits in homeruns for the first time in his career (11), while hitting for an average of .317 after a midseason trade to the Arizona Diamondbacks. He ended that year hitting a combined season average of .283. He would reach double digit homeruns once more in his final MLB season; hitting 11 in 2004.

Bautista won a World Series ring when the Diamondbacks beat the New York Yankees in seven games at the 2001 World Series, hitting .583 in the Series, fifth all-time in a single World Series.

In 2004, Bautista hit safely in 21 consecutive games. The streak ended during a game against the Philadelphia Phillies when Bautista went hitless in two at-bats. Bautista announced his retirement from baseball on March 19, 2005, following an ankle injury. Bautista had, at the time of his retirement, 685 hits at the major league level with a batting average of .272.

Danny played in the Atlantic League of Professional Baseball, which is not affiliated with MLB, for the York Revolution in the first season of the team's existence. After a trade, he played for the Camden Riversharks.

== See also ==
- List of players from Dominican Republic in Major League Baseball
