= Jeff Munn =

American public address announcer

Jeff Munn is an American public address announcer for the Arizona Diamondbacks of Major League Baseball and the former public address announcer for the Phoenix Suns of the National Basketball Association.

Munn began his broadcasting career as a senior at Phoenix Carl Hayden High School, then later announced games at Phoenix College in the late 1970s. After this, he served as the stadium voice of the Tostitos Fiesta Bowl for 13 years. Munn has announced at several major events. He served as an announcer for the 1993 U.S. Figure Skating Championships, the 1995 NBA All-Star Game, the 2000 WNBA All-Star Game, and the 2001 World Series. In 1996, he was selected as one of four announcers for the basketball competition at the Summer Olympics in Atlanta and handled the announcing duties for the Men's Gold Medal Game. In 2004, Munn was hired as the play-by-play voice for the Arizona State University women's basketball team.

Munn, who served as the arena voice for the Suns for 12 seasons, is also the fill-in radio play-by-play voice of the Diamondbacks.
