= Jim Traber =

American baseball player (born 1961)

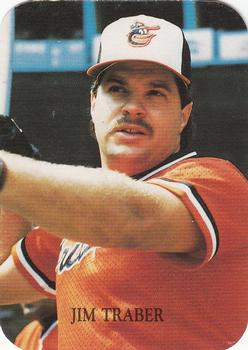
- First baseman
- Born: December 26, 1961 (age 64); Columbus, Ohio, U.S.
- Batted: Left Threw: Left

Professional debut
- MLB: September 21, 1984, for the Baltimore Orioles
- NPB: April 8, 1990, for the Kintetsu Buffaloes

Last appearance
- MLB: October 1, 1989, for the Baltimore Orioles
- NPB: October 10, 1991, for the Kintetsu Buffaloes

MLB statistics
- Batting average: .227
- Home runs: 27
- Runs batted in: 117

NPB statistics
- Batting average: .287
- Home runs: 53
- Runs batted in: 184
- Stats at Baseball Reference

Teams
- Baltimore Orioles (1984, 1986, 1988–1989); Kintetsu Buffaloes (1990–1991)

James Joseph Traber (born December 26, 1961) is an American former professional baseball first baseman, who played in Major League Baseball (MLB) for the Baltimore Orioles and in Nippon Professional Baseball (NPB) for the Kintetsu Buffaloes. After retiring from baseball, he pursued a career in broadcast media.

Traber was born in Columbus, Ohio, but grew up in Columbia, Maryland. While attending Wilde Lake High School in Columbia, he was an All-American — playing football, baseball, and other sports. Traber attended Oklahoma State University in the early 1980s, where he played both baseball (appearing twice in the College World Series) and football.

Traber was drafted by the Baltimore Orioles in the 21st round (544th overall) of the 1982 Major League Baseball draft. and played parts of four seasons for the Orioles between 1984 and 1989, where his nickname was "The Whammer". He soon found himself on a career-best hot streak that saw him crank out six homers and 17 runs batted in (RBI), while hitting .340, in his first 13 games, after being recalled in the summer of 1986. Traber's success with Baltimore was hindered by unfortunate timing — as veteran first baseman, Eddie Murray, wasn't ready to retire and Traber was anxious to play in that position — and he had not received any instruction as an outfielder in Minor League Baseball (MiLB), as his manager Earl Weaver lamented. Thus, Traber's options were limited to being a reserve-first baseman, DH, and pinch hitter.

Traber sang the national anthem at Memorial Stadium the night of his MLB debut.

After his MLB career, Traber played baseball in Japan for the Kintetsu Buffaloes in 1990 and 1991, and one season for Monterrey of the Mexican League in 1993. His time in Japan is perhaps most memorable for an incident in which Traber rushed the mound subsequent to being hit by a pitch, chasing the retreating Lotte Orions pitcher Kazumi Sonokawa into the outfield at the Akita Yabase Baseball Stadium. After charging the pitcher a second time, he was knocked off balance by the catcher while running and was kicked in the face on the way down by the Orions' manager, Masaichi Kaneda. Grainy footage of this incident is still widely distributed on the Internet.

Traber's involvement with sports talk radio began after his retirement from professional sports. He served as a television color analyst for Fox Sports' regional coverage of the Arizona Diamondbacks during the team's World Series victory season of 2001, for which he was awarded a World Series ring. Traber was also part-time color analyst for the 2001 World Series radio broadcast. He can be heard cheering in celebration behind Greg Schulte during the famous play-by-play call of "A little blooper... Base hit! Diamondbacks Win!" for Luis Gonzalez's game-winning hit. Traber continued announcing in 2002 and 2003. Currently, Traber hosts "The Afternoon Sports Beat" and "Total Dominance Hour," shows on WWLS-FM radio station in Oklahoma City, Oklahoma. He sometimes refers to callers as Yardbirds.

Traber has two sons with his ex-wife, and three daughters with his second wife Julie.
