= Greg Schulte =

American sportscaster (born 1967)

Greg Schulte is an American sportscaster, and is best known as the radio play-by-play voice of the Arizona Diamondbacks Major League Baseball team, a position he held from the team's inaugural season in 1998 until his retirement in 2023. Schulte's nickname is The Gub'nuh (like "The Governor" with an exaggerated English accent). He is known for his unique home run call, "Deep drive..warning track..wall..you can touch 'em all, (player's name)!” Schulte's most famous call was that of Luis Gonzalez's ninth-inning single to win Game 7 of the 2001 World Series.

Schulte called his 3,000th Diamondbacks game on April 19, 2017.

Schulte also covered the Phoenix Suns for many years, where he first produced the broadcasts, and later served as a color commentator to Al McCoy.

Schulte was the original pre-game and post-game host for the Arizona Cardinals.

In February 2023, the Diamondbacks announced that Schulte would retire at the end of the 2023 season. The final game that he called was Game 5 of the 2023 World Series.
