= History of the Arizona Diamondbacks =

American baseball team's history

The Arizona Diamondbacks (often shortened as the D-Backs) are an American professional baseball team based in Phoenix, Arizona. They were formed in 1998 and are based at Chase Field (formerly Bank One Ballpark), after five years of preparation under the leadership of Jerry Colangelo. The Diamondbacks won the 2001 World Series against the Yankees, becoming the fastest expansion team in Major League Baseball to win a championship, doing so in only the fourth season since their first in 1998. Financial difficulties later ensued, leading to the home field being renamed Chase Field in 2005, as a result of Bank One Corporation's merger with JPMorgan Chase & Co. After a lean period, the team won the National League West division in 2011. During the 2023 season, the team finished as a wild card; however, they would upset several teams en route to their second-ever World Series appearance. They would lose the 2023 World Series 4-1 to the Texas Rangers. They have not made the postseason since.

== 1940–1997: Bringing Major League Baseball to Arizona ==
Baseball had a rich tradition in Arizona long before talk of bringing a big-league team even started. The state has been a frequent spring training site since 1946. With a large number of people relocating to the state from the Midwest and the Northeast, as well as from California, many teams (most notably the Chicago Cubs and the San Francisco Giants) have normally had large followings in Arizona. By the 1980s, the Phoenix metropolitan area's explosive growth since the end of World War II had made it the 14th-largest in the nation, with over two million residents. Phoenix proper had risen to the ninth largest city in the nation after being 99th in 1950. It was a foregone conclusion that the city would eventually get a major league team.

The first serious attempt to land an expansion team for the Phoenix area was mounted by and Martin Stone, owner of the Phoenix Firebirds, the city's triple-A minor league baseball team and the top affiliate of the San Francisco Giants. In the late 1980s Stone approached St. Louis (football) Cardinals owner Bill Bidwill about sharing a proposed 70,000 seat domed stadium in Phoenix that would have been the centerpiece of a major plan to redevelop downtown Phoenix. It would have been financed with $150 million in municipal bonds, which would have been repaid with the proceeds from skyboxes and luxury seats. It was taken for granted that a domed stadium was a must for a major-league team to be a viable venture in the Phoenix area. Phoenix is by far the hottest major city in North America; the average high temperature during baseball's regular season is 99.1 °F (37.3 °C), and game-time temperatures well above 100 °F (38 °C) are very common during the summer.

Bidwill, with plans already in the works to leave St. Louis, opted instead to sign a long-term lease with Arizona State University to use its Sun Devil Stadium as the home of his soon-to-be Arizona-based NFL franchise. Since baseball-only stadiums were not seen as fiscally viable during that era, Stone pulled his support for the stadium. In 1989, Phoenix voters overwhelmingly rejected the issuance of the first $100 million in bonds for the proposed stadium. In response, the Arizona Legislature authorized Phoenix to bypass a referendum in order to build a stadium. It also authorized Maricopa County, home to Phoenix and most of its suburbs, to finance any proposed stadium with a 0.25 percent sales tax.

In the fall of 1993, Jerry Colangelo, majority owner of the Phoenix Suns, the area's NBA franchise, announced he was assembling an ownership group, "Arizona Baseball, Inc.", to apply for a Major League Baseball expansion team. This was after a great deal of lobbying by the Maricopa County Sports Authority, a local group formed to preserve Cactus League spring training in Arizona and eventually secure a Major League franchise for the state.

Colangelo's group was so confident that they would be awarded a franchise that they held a public contest to name the prospective team. As a demonstration of their certainty, they took out a full-page advertisement in the sports section of the February 13, 1995 edition of the Arizona Republic, the state's leading newspaper, to promote the naming contest. First prize was a pair of lifetime season tickets awarded to the person who submitted the winning entry. The winning choice was "Diamondbacks", after the Western diamondback, a rattlesnake native to the region known for injecting a large amount of venom when it strikes. In addition to a write-in option, the four provided choices that did not win were the Arizona "Coyotes", "Phoenix", "Rattlers", and "Scorpions".

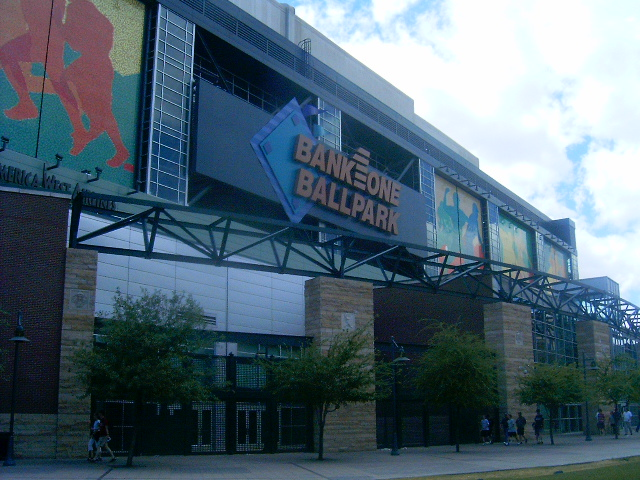
Bank One Ballpark (now Chase Field) in April 2005

Colangelo's bid received strong support from one of his friends, Chicago White Sox and Chicago Bulls owner Jerry Reinsdorf, and media reports say that then-acting Commissioner of Baseball and Milwaukee Brewers founder Bud Selig was also a strong supporter of Colangelo's bid. Plans were also made for a new retractable-roof ballpark, Bank One Ballpark, nicknamed the BOB, (renamed in 2005 to Chase Field) to be built in an industrial/warehouse district on the southeast edge of downtown Phoenix, one block from the Suns' America West Arena (now Mortgage Matchup Center).

On March 9, 1995, Colangelo's group was awarded a franchise to begin play for the 1998 season. A $130 million franchise fee was paid to Major League Baseball. The Tampa Bay area was also granted a franchise, the Devil Rays (to be based in St. Petersburg), at the same time.

Arizona had originally been intended to join Tampa Bay in the American League. However, five American League teams had threatened to block the league assignments because of concerns that they would have additional games out of their time zone, causing early starts that would decrease revenue and TV ratings. Thus, on January 16, 1997, the Diamondbacks were officially voted into the National League while their expansion counterparts in Tampa Bay were voted into the American League. MLB reserved the right to unilaterally move either the Diamondbacks or Devil Rays to another league within the first five years of existence. After the 2001 season, with the possibility of the Twins and Expos being eliminated, it was possible the Diamondbacks would move to the American League. However, MLB's franchise contraction plans never materialized.

According to the original press release from Colangelo's group (which remained posted on the team website during the first few seasons) the chosen team colors were Arizona turquoise, copper, black and purple. "... Turquoise was chosen because the greenish-blue stone is indigenous to Arizona, copper because Arizona is one [of] the nation's top copper-producing states and purple because it has become a favorite color for Arizona sports fans, thanks to the success of the National Basketball Association's Phoenix Suns." The distinctive "A" logo and color scheme was developed by Campbell Fisher Ditko, a Phoenix-based graphic design firm (which also designed the now-iconic "Streaking Sun" logo for the Suns for the 1992 season).

In the earliest days, the Diamondbacks operated as a subsidiary of the Suns; several executives and managers with the Suns and America West Arena were brought over to the Diamondbacks in similar roles. As the expansion draft had yet to take place, there were no actual Diamondback players, so members of the Suns team, including team captain and three-time NBA All-Star point guard Kevin Johnson (who was actually drafted by the Oakland A's in 1986 as a shortstop; he chose to focus exclusively on his basketball career as a pro), Danny Ainge (who actually briefly played in Major League Baseball at the beginning of his career for the Toronto Blue Jays), Danny Manning and coach Paul Westphal, joined Colangelo and modeled the first prototype Diamondbacks uniforms, also designed by Campbell Fisher Ditko, at a publicity event in early November 1995. These uniforms and caps were immediately made available for sale to the public.

From the beginning, Colangelo wanted to market the Diamondbacks to a statewide fan base and not limit fan appeal to Phoenix and its suburbs. Colangelo decided to call the team the "Arizona Diamondbacks" rather than the "Phoenix Diamondbacks". Although every Major League Baseball team does cultivate fans from outside its immediate metropolitan area, and even though the greater Phoenix area has 2/3 of the statewide population, there are long-standing historic rivalries between Phoenix and Arizona's other cities, such as Tucson, which at times diminish statewide appeal and enthusiasm for a Phoenix-based team.

A series of team-sponsored fan motor coach trips from Tucson to Bank One Ballpark were inaugurated for the opening season and are still in operation to this day (it is now known as the "D-backs Express"). The Diamondbacks are also known for the "Hometown Tour", held in January, where selected players, management and broadcasters make public appearances, hold autograph signings, etc., in various locations around Phoenix and Tucson, as well as many small and mid-sized towns in other areas of Arizona.

Despite their early efforts to appeal to the entire state, in 2009 the Diamondbacks moved their Triple-A Pacific Coast League farm team, the Tucson Sidewinders, to Reno, where they are now known as the Aces. In 2011, they also moved their spring training base from Tucson to a new stadium near the Phoenix suburb of Scottsdale.

Two years before their first opening day, Colangelo hired the then-recently fired Buck Showalter, the American League Manager of the Year in 1994 with the New York Yankees, as the D-Backs' first manager.

Their lower level Minor League Baseball teams began play in 1996; the expansion draft was held in November 1997. The Diamondbacks would replace the above-mentioned Firebirds as the main baseball team in Phoenix; they would move south to Tucson and become the Sidewinders, serving as the AAA club for the new team.

== 1998–2002: Expansion days, World Series surprise ==
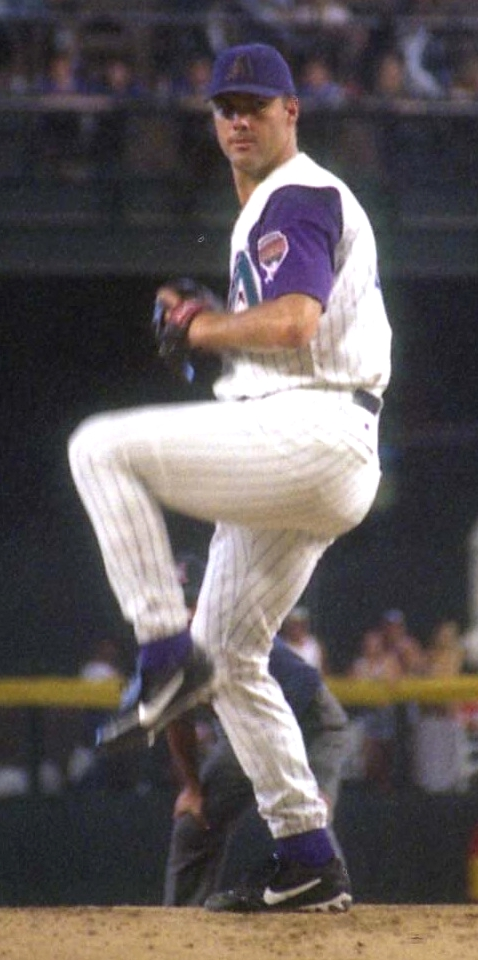
Pitcher Andy Benes threw the first ever regular season pitch in Arizona Diamondbacks history.

The Diamondbacks' first major league game was played against the Colorado Rockies on March 31, 1998, at Bank One Ballpark before a standing-room only crowd of 50,179. Tickets had gone on sale on January 10 and sold out before lunch. The Rockies won, 9–2, with Andy Benes on the mound for the Diamondbacks, and Travis Lee being the first Diamondbacks player to get a hit (a single in his first MLB at bat), then became the first Diamondback to score, homer and drive in a run in his second MLB plate appearance.

In their first five seasons of existence, the Diamondbacks won three division titles (1999, 2001, 2002) a National League pennant (2001) and a World Series championship (2001). In 1999, Arizona won 100 games in only its second season to win the NL West title. They lost to the New York Mets in four games in the NLDS.

Colangelo fired Showalter after a relatively disappointing 2000 season, and replaced him with Bob Brenly, the former Giants catcher and coach, who had up to that point been working as a color analyst on Diamondbacks television broadcasts. In 2001, the team was led by two of the most dominant pitchers in all of baseball: Randy Johnson and Curt Schilling. Arizona had postseason victories over the St. Louis Cardinals (3–2 in the NLDS) and the Atlanta Braves (4–1 in the NLCS) to advance to the World Series where, in the wake of the September 11 terrorist attacks in New York City, they beat the three-time reigning champions, the New York Yankees, 4–3, to become the youngest expansion franchise to win the World Series (in just their fourth season of play). The previous mark was held by the Florida Marlins. This was the first time since 1991 that the home team won all seven games of a World Series, and the Diamondbacks were the first National League team to prevail in such a World Series.

An estimated orderly crowd of over 300,000 celebrated at the Diamondbacks victory parade, held at Bank One Ballpark and the surrounding downtown Phoenix streets on November 7, 2001. This was the first men's major professional sports championship for the state of Arizona and the first for a team (in the four major North American professional sports leagues) owned or controlled by Colangelo, whose basketball Phoenix Suns made it to the NBA Finals in 1976 and 1993 but lost both times.

The team finished the 2002 season with a 98–64 record and won their third NL West title in five years, but were swept out in the NLDS by the St. Louis Cardinals. Randy Johnson was awarded with his fourth consecutive Cy Young Award as well the Major League Baseball Triple Crown.

== 2003–2004: The end Of the Colangelo era ==
Arizona ended the 2003 season with an 84–78 record, in 3rd place in the NL West. Both Johnson and Schilling had suffered injuries during the season and Schilling was traded in the off season to the Boston Red Sox where he contributed to that team's 2004 World Series victory.

By this time, Colangelo and the other partners were embroiled in a dispute over the financial health and direction of the Diamondbacks. In his push to build a competitive team right away, Colangelo signed blue-chip free agents to large contracts with deferred salaries. Notably, more than half the payroll for the 2001 World Series championship team was deferred. The Diamondbacks were forced to significantly increase ticket prices several times in the early 2000s, and were forced to trade Schilling and Johnson in 2003 and 2004, respectively, in hopes of stemming the tide. Even with these measures, by 2004, the club owed $150 million in deferred salaries.

Colangelo's willingness to go into debt and acquire players through free agency had led to one of the quickest free falls in major sports history. In 2004, the Diamondbacks were only above .500 once all season, and by the end of June they were 28–50, their season all but finished. Just three years after winning the World Series and two years after winning their third division title in four years, the Diamondbacks had dropped to a dismal 51–111 record, the worst in Major League Baseball and one of the 10 worst records (in terms of losses) in the modern era. This came despite Johnson pitching a perfect game on May 18 of that season. Brenly was fired partway through the season and was replaced on an interim basis by third base coach Al Pedrique. The .315 winning percentage is still the worst in franchise history.

Colangelo also did not finish out the season. He was forced to resign as managing general partner in the late summer of 2004. In a 2004 interview with columnist Hal Bodley of USA TODAY, Colangelo defended his actions:

I understand where some people felt I wasn't doing it appropriately. The only analogy I can use is that Tampa Bay (the other '98 expansion team) went one direction and where did they end up? (Six last-place finishes and low attendance) ... We went another direction to establish a fan base because our investment was much larger than Tampa Bay's. And we put so much money into our own stadium ($130 million). After the first year and the decrease in season tickets, I was convinced we had to build a fan base ... We bought three division titles, a World Series and established a fan base ... ... I believe what we did will last a long, long time ... Right or wrong, a number of teams today are in the $50 million payroll range and competitive – Oakland, Minnesota, Texas are examples. Our goal was to get returns from our farm system. We built into our cash-flow that we would be paying out the deferments and that our payroll could drop to $50 million for a few years ... A few things hurt us ... The economy was bad, and I was hoping for more national money (from baseball's central fund) coming in.

Colangelo sold his general partnership shares to a group of investors who were all involved as partners in the founding of the team in 1995. The investors include equal partners Ken Kendrick, Mike Chipman, and Jeffrey Royer. Kendrick became managing general partner. Jeff Moorad, a former sports agent, joined the partnership, and was named the team's CEO; becoming its primary public face.

== 2004–2007: Uniform redesign, return to the postseason ==
Following the 2004 season, the Diamondbacks hired Wally Backman to be the team's manager. Backman was formerly manager of the Class A California League Lancaster JetHawks, one of the Diamondbacks' minor-league affiliates. In a turn of events that proved to be a minor embarrassment for the reorganized ownership group, Backman was almost immediately fired after management learned, after the fact, of legal troubles and improprieties in Backman's past. Former Seattle Mariners manager and Diamondbacks bench coach Bob Melvin became the new manager after only a ten-day tenure for Backman.

Following the Backman incident, the Diamondbacks spent heavily on free agents in order to re-build. The club signed third baseman Troy Glaus, pitcher Russ Ortiz, shortstop Royce Clayton, and second baseman Craig Counsell, among others. They then entered into a three-way deal with the New York Yankees and Los Angeles Dodgers: Randy Johnson was sent to the New York Yankees, for Javier Vázquez, Brad Halsey, and Dioner Navarro who was then dealt to the Dodgers for Shawn Green. Finally, they traded Casey Fossum to the Tampa Bay Devil Rays for José Cruz Jr. The Diamondbacks were considered by some to be the favorite to win the division after spending on the aforementioned free agents; however, injuries hurt the team's chances of reaching its expected potential.

The Diamondbacks, led by Melvin, finished the 2005 season with a record of 77 wins and 85 losses. Though a losing season, this was a 26-game improvement over 2004, and sufficient for second place in a woefully weak NL West, five games behind the San Diego Padres.

In May 2005, the Diamondbacks hired Derrick Hall from the Los Angeles Dodgers. He was named president of the club in September of the next year. In October 2005 the Diamondbacks hired 35-year-old Josh Byrnes, assistant general manager of the Boston Red Sox, to replace the outgoing Joe Garagiola Jr. as Diamondbacks General Manager. Garagiola took a position in Major League Baseball's main offices in New York City.

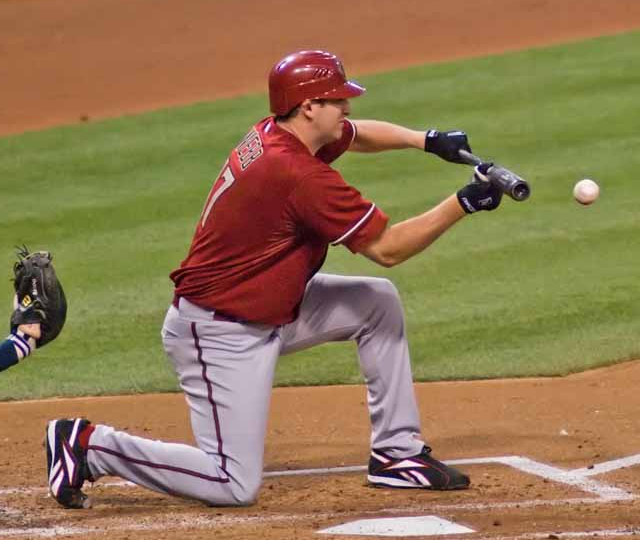
Pitcher Brandon Webb, winner of the 2006 Cy Young Award, was a prominent member of the team in the late 2000s.

In a weak NL West division, the Diamondbacks failed to improve on their 2005 performance, finishing fourth with a slightly worse record than the year before. The season did include two excellent individual performances, however. 2B Orlando Hudson became the recipient of his second career Gold Glove Award, as announced on November 3 becoming only the sixth infielder in major league history to win a Gold Glove award in both the American and National Leagues. On November 14, it was announced that RHP Brandon Webb was the recipient of the Cy Young Award for the National League. Webb, a specialist in throwing the sinkerball, received 15 of 32 first-place votes in balloting by the Baseball Writers' Association of America. Webb went 16–8 with a 3.10 ERA and in the 2006 season was named to his first All-Star team.

Several significant trades were made during the off season. The Diamondbacks and Brewers made a trade on November 25, 2006. Johnny Estrada, Greg Aquino, and Claudio Vargas were dealt to the Milwaukee Brewers for Doug Davis, Dana Eveland, and Dave Krynzel. On Sunday January 7, it was announced that Randy Johnson would return to the Diamondbacks on a two-year contract, pending a physical. He was obtained from the Yankees in exchange for Luis Vizcaíno, Ross Ohlendorf, Alberto González and Steven Jackson, with the Yankees paying $2 million of Johnson's $26 million salary. The Diamondbacks and Florida Marlins made a deal March 26 to acquire RHP Yusmeiro Petit in exchange for Jorge Julio and cash.

The Diamondbacks announced in early September 2006 that their uniforms, which remained largely unchanged since the team's first season, would be completely redesigned for the 2007 season. Details were supposed to be kept from the public until after the 2006 postseason as per MLB rules, but the Diamondback page from the 2007 MLB Official Style Guide was somehow leaked around September 25, and local media broadcast printed the new design for all to see. Of great surprise to many fans was a brand new color scheme; apparently the original colors used by the franchise since Major League Baseball awarded it to Jerry Colangelo's ownership group in 1995 were to be discontinued.

While some fans applauded the redesign, most of the reaction to the new color scheme, which included the changing of the historical purple and traditional Arizonan colors of copper and turquoise to a reddish color known as "Sedona Red" similar to those of the Coyotes and Cardinals color schemes, was pointedly negative. The official unveiling of the uniforms came at a charity event on November 8 in nearby Scottsdale, where several of the players modeled the uniforms on a runway, and posed for publicity photos. The distinctive "A" design remained unchanged save for the colors. The stylized snake-like "D" logo, also used since the early days for the road uniforms, was slightly redesigned and a completely new shoulder patch introduced. The lettering on the jerseys was completely redesigned. "Sedona Red" became the dominant color scheme used throughout Chase Field and in all marketing and promotional materials for the Diamondback ball club. Also, the team officially adopted the shortened nickname "D-Backs" for marketing purposes; it was added to the front of the uniforms. The shortened name had been used since the franchise's inception. but since 2007, "Diamondbacks" and "D-Backs" have been officially interchangeable.

Not only did the Diamondbacks uniforms change, but many faces of the organization changed as well. Fan favorite and Diamondbacks stalwart Luis Gonzalez did not return as the left fielder for the Diamondbacks. The most popular player in franchise history, "Gonzo" signed a one-year contract worth just under $7 million on December 7 to play for the rival Los Angeles Dodgers for the 2007 season. Craig Counsell, Miguel Batista and Jay Bell also signed with other teams, as did Thom Brennaman, the original Diamondbacks play-by-play man.

In the 2007 regular season, the Diamondbacks enjoyed success with a young team including Brandon Webb, Conor Jackson, Stephen Drew, Carlos Quentin, Chad Tracy, Chris Young, Miguel Montero, Mark Reynolds (called up from Double-A in May) and Justin Upton (called up from Double-A in August). Despite being outscored over the season, the Diamondbacks posted the best record in the NL with 90 wins and 72 losses. Their unorthodox style led to the team adopting an unofficial motto coined by 1st baseman Tony Clark: "Anybody, Anytime." On September 28, the Diamondbacks defeated the Colorado Rockies to secure a position in the 2007 playoffs. After the Padres' defeat at the hands of the Milwaukee Brewers on September 29, the Diamondbacks secured both the NL West title and home field advantage throughout the NL playoffs.

After taking the first two games at home against the Cubs, in the National League Division Series, they took the series to Wrigley Field, where they completed their sweep, earning their first berth in the National League Championship Series since 2001. In the NLCS, they faced the Colorado Rockies again. The Rockies had been on an incredible winning pace since the All Star break, and they swept the Diamondbacks in four games.

On December 3, 2007, the Diamondbacks traded Carlos Quentin, who had failed to perform to expectation, to the Chicago White Sox for first base prospect Chris Carter.

On December 14, in a blockbuster trade, the Diamondbacks acquired starting RHP Dan Haren from the Oakland Athletics for six players: LHP Brett Anderson, LHP Dana Eveland and LHP Greg Smith; the above-mentioned just-acquired infielder Chris Carter; and outfielders Aaron Cunningham and Carlos González. The team also traded relief pitcher José Valverde, who led the major leagues in saves in 2007 with 47, to the Houston Astros for reliever Chad Qualls, RHP Juan Gutiérrez and IF/OF Chris Burke. Haren was 15–9 with a 3.07 ERA for Oakland in 2007. On August 5, 2008 Dan Haren signed a four-year, $44.75 million deal with the Diamondbacks worth a guaranteed $41.25 million through 2012 and including a $15.5 million club option for 2013 with a $3.5 million buyout.

== 2008–2010: Mediocre years ==
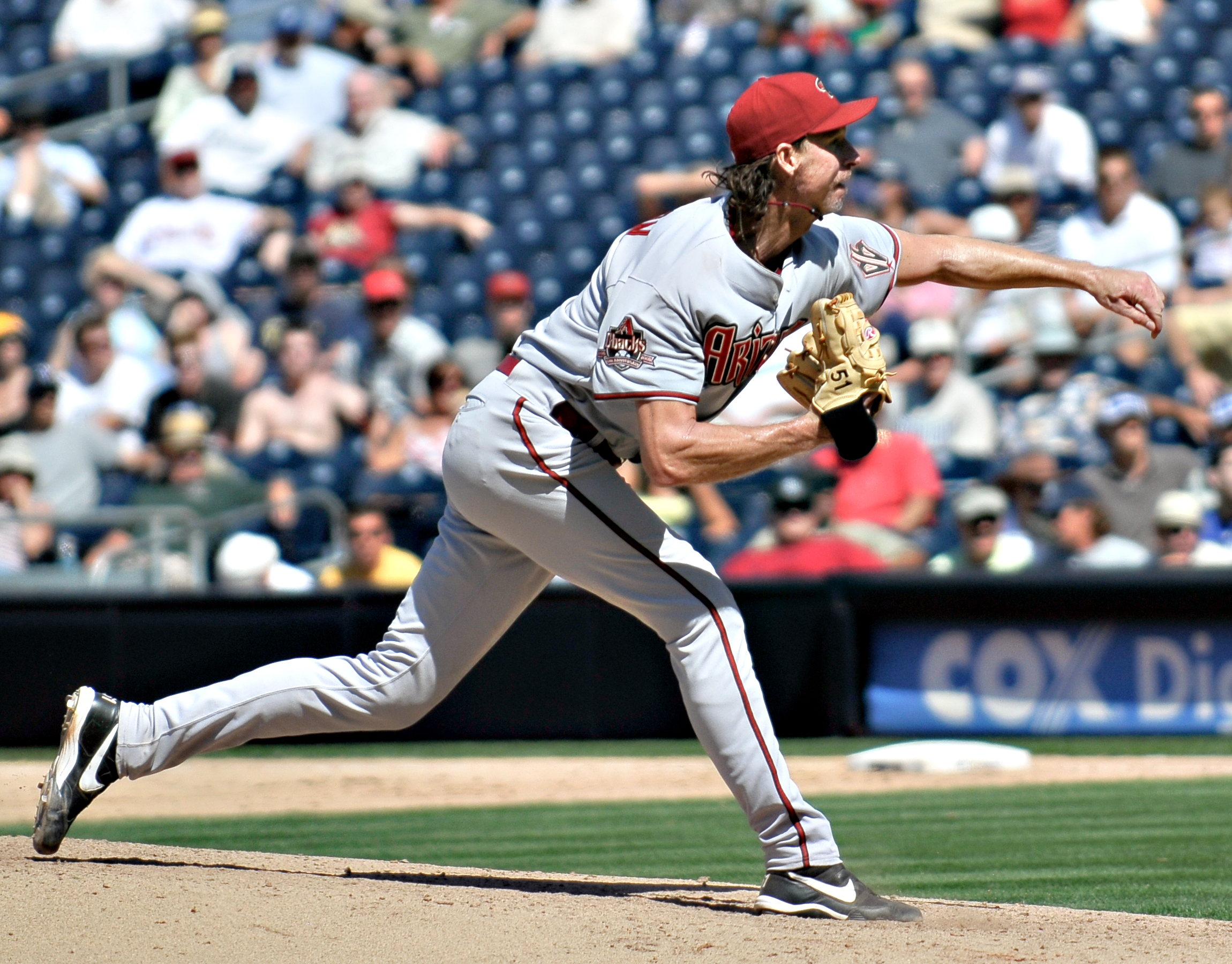
Randy Johnson pitching for the Arizona Diamondbacks

Looking to capitalize on the previous season's unexpected playoff run, the Arizona Diamondbacks got off to a hot start in 2008. After winning the opening game of the season on March 31 on the road against the Cincinnati Reds, the Diamondbacks found themselves with the best record in Major League Baseball, 20–8, by the start of May. At that time, they also led the NL West by 6.5 games. Despite the strong start, the team played poorly in May and June and entered the All Star break at 47–48, still leading the NL West.

Orlando Hudson underwent season-ending surgery on his left wrist August 9 in the wake of a collision with catcher Brian McCann of the Atlanta Braves. Hudson was due to become a free agent at the end of the season and would not be re-signed. LF Eric Byrnes was on the 60-day disabled list from late June, with a torn left hamstring, and was out for the remainder of the season.

On August 11, 2008, Dallas Buck, RHP Micah Owings, and C Wilkin Castillo were traded to the Reds (in last place in the NL Central at the time) in exchange for OF Adam Dunn. Dunn, who was tied for the major league lead with 32 home runs, was expected to provide a significant boost to an offense that has struggled to score runs for most of the season. Dunn seemed quite positive about being traded to a ball club in first place in its division in August. The move was seen by some fans as a belated attempt by the D-backs to counter the trade by their division rival, the Los Angeles Dodgers, for Boston Red Sox power-hitting OF Manny Ramirez on July 31 and also to compensate for the injuries to Hudson and Byrnes, generally considered two of the more "power-hitting" Diamondbacks on a team which has relied heavily on pitching and defense in recent years. A free agent at the end of the season, on February 11, 2009, Dunn agreed to a two-year $20 million contract with the Washington Nationals. On August 31, the Diamondbacks acquired former World Series MVP David Eckstein to fill the hole at second base which was opened after Orlando Hudson was placed on the disabled list. Eckstein was traded from the Toronto Blue Jays for Minor League pitcher Chad Beck. Despite the acquisitions, the team failed to improve and finished with a record of 82–80, in second place behind the Los Angeles Dodgers.

In January 2009, team President Derrick Hall was named CEO as Jeff Moorad left the Diamondbacks to pursue an ownership bid with the San Diego Padres. Managing general partner Kendrick now became the public face of the ownership group and the operating head of the franchise. On May 8, after going 12–17 in 29 games, the Diamondbacks released manager Bob Melvin and hired A. J. Hinch. The 2009 Diamondbacks ended the season in last place and a record of 70 wins and 92 losses. The Diamondbacks' tough year was blamed on a struggling offense, and an inadequate pitching staff which had a collective ERA of 4.18.

The Diamondbacks ended the 2010 season with a 65–97 record. This poor performance was blamed on an extremely weak bullpen, which finished with a collective 5.47 ERA, and a lack of offense which was punctuated by the team setting the single season strikeout record with 1,529. On July 1, general manager Josh Byrnes and manager A. J. Hinch were fired and replaced on an interim basis by Jerry Dipoto and Kirk Gibson respectively. (Gibson was later named the manager on a permanent basis, but Dipoto was replaced by Kevin Towers)

== 2011: One-year revival ==
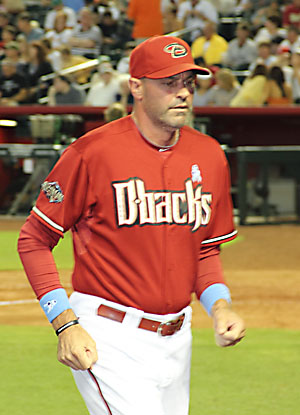
Kirk Gibson managed the 2011 NL West Champion Diamondbacks

In a season projected by many to be a last place finish, the Arizona Diamondbacks bucked expectations maintaining playoff contention at the All Star break with a 49–43 record, only 3 games behind the 1st place San Francisco Giants. The Diamondbacks' success has been credited to the approach of manager Kirk Gibson as well as strong starting pitching behind Ian Kennedy, Daniel Hudson, Joe Saunders, and rookie Josh Collmenter as well as a much improved bullpen led by closer J. J. Putz.

The franchise opened Salt River Fields at Talking Stick, their new Spring training home in Scottsdale to rave reviews. The D-backs share the complex with the Colorado Rockies.

The Diamondbacks' ballpark, Chase Field played host to the 2011 All-Star game on July 12. This was highlighted by the first use of the designated hitter rule in a National League ballpark.

Toward the end of the trade deadline on July 31, 2011, the Diamondbacks acquired Washington Nationals right-handed pitcher Jason Marquis to strengthen their starting rotation, in exchange for Minor League shortstop Zach Walters. The day after, in a move to boost their bullpen strength, consistency and depth, the Diamondbacks acquired reliever Brad Ziegler from the Oakland Athletics in exchange for first baseman Brandon Allen and reliever Jordan Norberto. On August 23, the Diamondbacks traded struggling second baseman Kelly Johnson to the Toronto Blue Jays for second baseman Aaron Hill and shortstop John McDonald. The Diamondbacks surged after the All Star Break, posting a 45–25 record. On September 23, the Diamondbacks defeated the San Francisco Giants 3–1 to clinch the National League West division title. They ended the season with a 94–68 record, a 29-game reversal over the prior year's performance. The Arizona Diamondbacks faced the Milwaukee Brewers in the 2011 National League Division Series, but lost 3–2 in the decisive game 5 in 10 innings.

== 2012–2016: Return To mediocrity ==
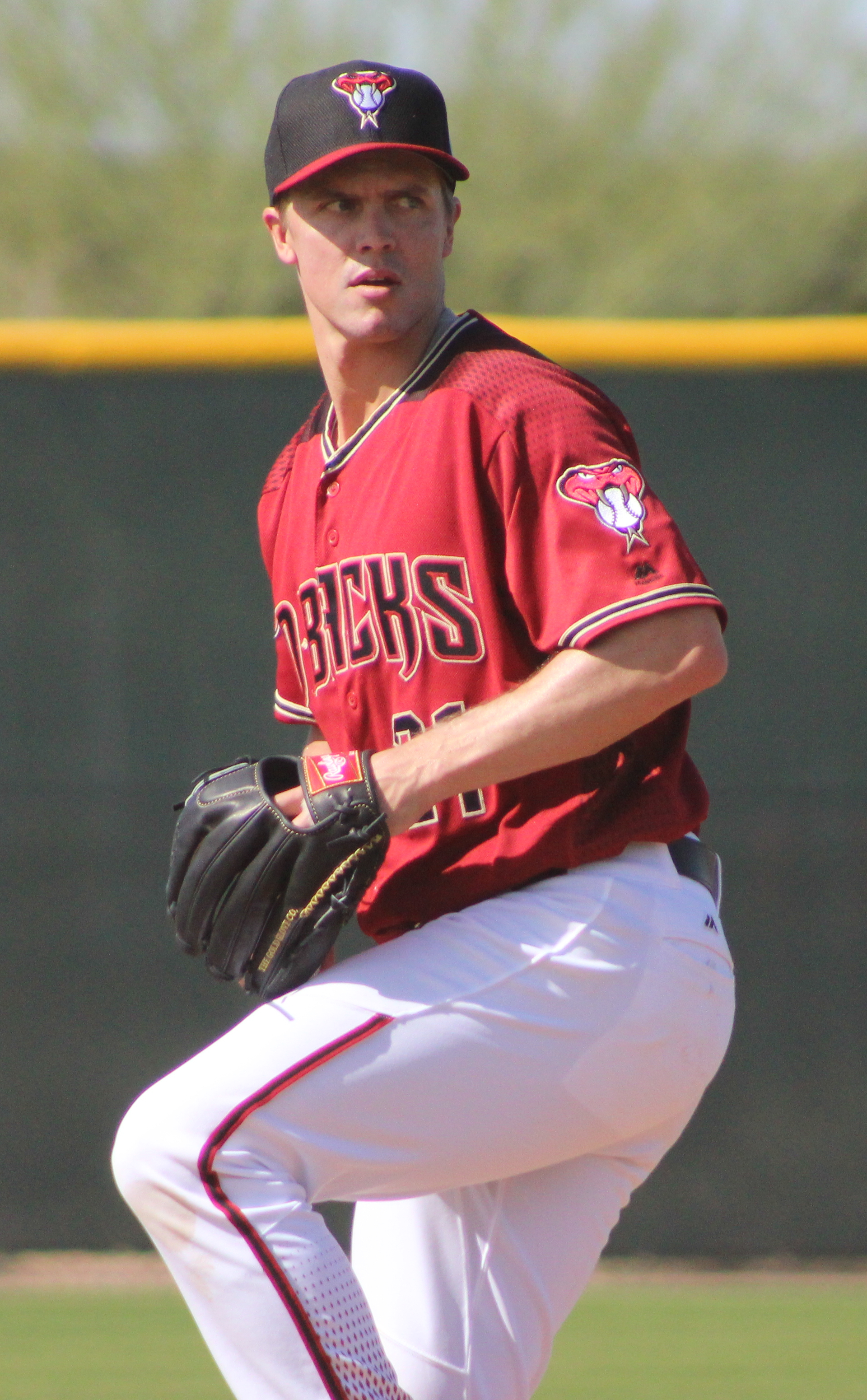
Pitcher Zack Greinke served as the team ace in the late 2010s before the front office traded him to the Houston Astros in the middle of the 2019 season.

The Diamondbacks' 2012 season was less fruitful. The team's collection of players could not match the level of success they had had the year prior. In June, Aaron Hill made history by becoming the first player to hit two cycles in one year during the modern era. He was the fourth to do so all time, joining the ranks of John Reilly, Babe Herman, and Tip O'Neill. He was also the fastest to do so, accomplishing this feat within 2 weeks. In July, Daniel Hudson had season-ending Tommy John surgery, and in August Stephen Drew was traded to the Oakland A's. In the off season the D-backs traded star Chris Young to the A's and acquired closer Heath Bell from the Miami Marlins. The 2012 season did introduce new stars such as Wade Miley and Chris Johnson. Miley was a rookie who led the team in wins and strike outs, and also broke the franchise record for most wins by a rookie, while Johnson was acquired in a trade with the Houston Astros and hit 5 home runs including a grand slam in his first 10 games.

The 2013 Diamondbacks finished second in the NL West despite having a record of 81–81 for the second consecutive season. It marked the 3rd straight non-losing season which was their best streak since their early days of 1999–2003.

The 2014 Diamondbacks ended the year with a Major League worst 64–98 record. General manager Kevin Towers was fired on September 5 and replaced by Dave Stewart. On September 26, manager Kirk Gibson was also fired, ending his 4 1/2-year tenure as the Diamondbacks' manager. On October 13, Chip Hale was announced as the new Diamondbacks' manager.

The 2015 D-backs improved under new manager Chip Hale and finished with a 79–83 record and in third place in the NL West. On April 28, highly regarded pitching prospect Archie Bradley suffered a sinus fracture when he was hit in the face by a line drive off the bat of Colorado Rockies outfielder Carlos González, and was placed on the 15-day disabled list. This led to the call up of pitching prospect Robbie Ray on May 6.

During the off season, on December 8, star pitcher and former Cy Young Award winner Zack Greinke signed a 6-year, $206.5 million contract with the Diamondbacks, to be their ace and Opening Day starter for the upcoming season.

Despite the acquisition of Greinke, in 2016, the team finished 69–93 for their third consecutive losing season, while spending the majority of the season in a back-and-forth battle with the San Diego Padres at the bottom of the NL West standings. Following the season, General Manager Dave Stewart and Manager Chip Hale were fired.

== 2017–present: Up, back to World Series, then down again ==
2017 marked the first playoff berth since 2011 and the first-ever wild card berth for Arizona. The Diamondbacks finished 93–69, a 24-game reversal of 2016. They faced the division rival Colorado Rockies in a thrilling wild card playoff which resulted in an 11–8 win to face the Dodgers in the NLDS. However their season came down to an end in a 3–0 sweep. 2018 marked another winning season at 82–80, a feat not achieved since 2007–08 but failed to qualify for consecutive playoff berths, finishing 3rd in the NL West.

The Diamondbacks had a mediocre start to 2019, reaching the end of July with a 54–55 record. They traded Greinke to the Houston Astros on July 31, but improved the following two months to finish second in the NL West at 85–77. In the pandemic-shortened 2020 season, the Diamondbacks fell to last place in the NL West with a 25–35 record. In 2021, the Diamondbacks started at 15–13 before going on a 5–40 stretch over their next 45 games including two losing streaks of 10 games or more including a franchise record 17 losses in a row that plunged their record to 20–53. They also broke the MLB record for most consecutive road losses in the modern era at 24 in a row which also tied them all-time with the 1889 Louisville Colonels. They ended the season at a dismal 52–110 record, tied with the Baltimore Orioles for the worst in baseball that year and the second-worst in Diamondbacks history, just one loss behind 2004. Nevertheless, Lovullo's contract with Arizona was extended through the 2022 season, where the team finished fourth in the NL West with a 74–88 record.

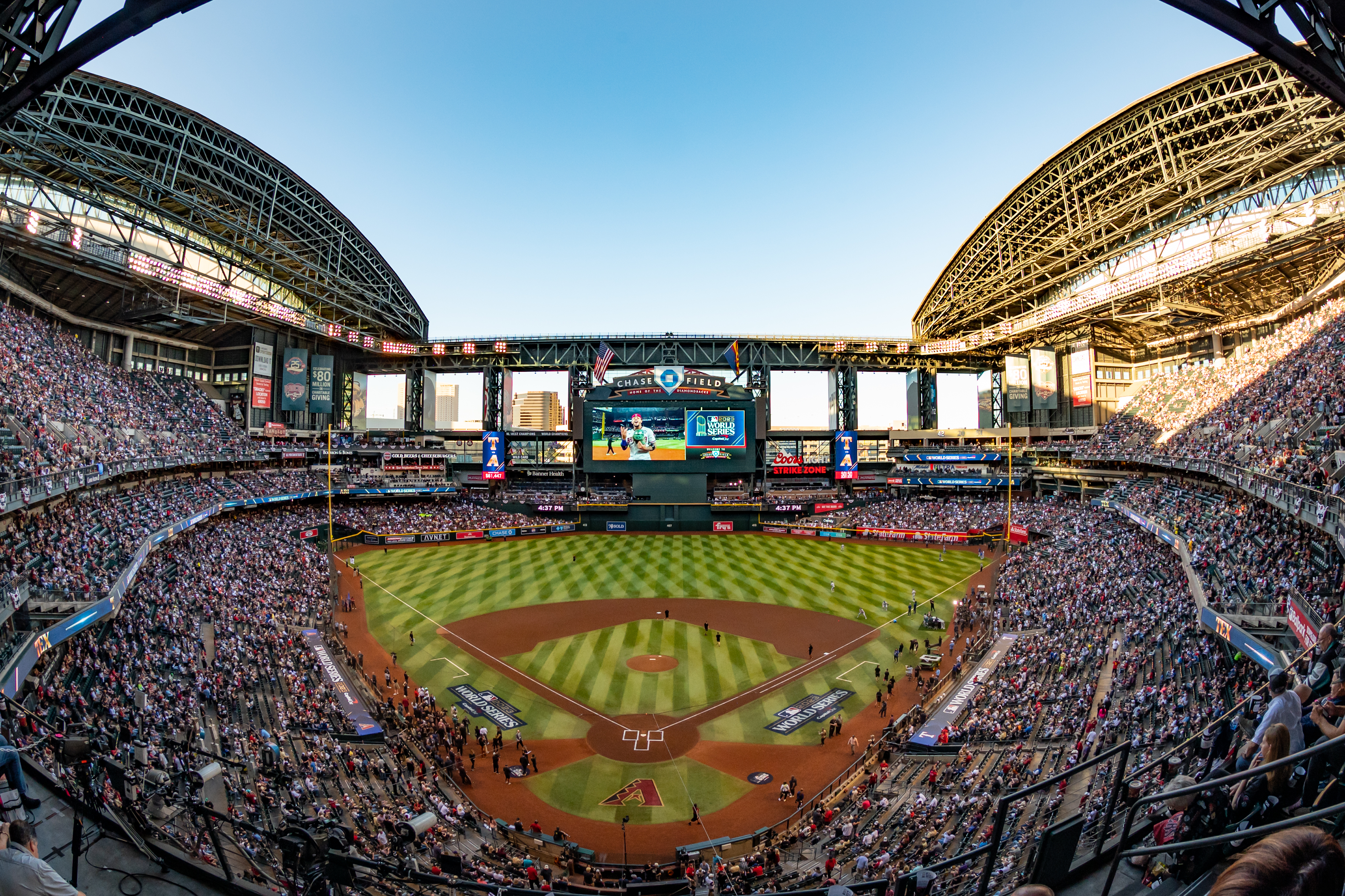
Chase Field hosted games 3, 4, and 5 of the 2023 World Series

In 2023, the Diamondbacks finished 84–78 to record their first winning season since 2019, while also securing the 3rd National League wild card slot for their first postseason appearance since 2017. The season also included Corbin Carroll becoming the first rookie in MLB history to record 25 home runs and 50 stolen bases in a single season. The Diamondbacks defeated the Milwaukee Brewers in 2 games in the Wild Card Series, becoming only the 4th team in postseason history to win their first two postseason games with multi-run comebacks. They proceeded to sweep the Dodgers in 3 games to advance to the NLCS for the first time since 2007, along the way becoming the first team in postseason history to hit 4 homeruns in a single inning. The Diamondbacks then proceeded to beat the heavily favored Philadelphia Phillies and win the NL Pennant in 7 games. They would ultimately fall to the Texas Rangers 4–1 as that team won their first ever World Series.

In 2024, the Diamondbacks finished 3rd in the NL West with a 89–73 record. Despite this decent result, the team would miss out on the last wild card spot, losing on head to head tiebreakers to the Atlanta Braves and New York Mets.

In the 2025 Season the Diamondbacks would again miss the playoffs after falling to 4th in the NL West with an 80–82 record.

In 2026, the Diamondbacks posted a 86-76 record, but failed to make the postseason once again after ending up 2 games back of a wild card spot, led by the Padres, Cubs, and Phillies.
