= List of Arizona Diamondbacks team records =

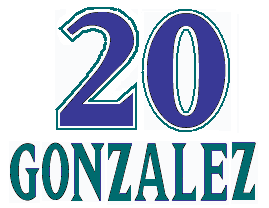
Luis Gonzalez holds 19 franchise records, including 10 career records and 9 single-season records.

The Arizona Diamondbacks are a professional baseball team based in Phoenix, Arizona. They compete in the Western Division of Major League Baseball's (MLB) National League (NL). Arizona first competed in MLB during the 1998 season as an expansion team. The list below documents players and teams that hold particular club records.

In 28 seasons from 1998 through 2026, the team has won 2,253 games and one World Series championship, in 2001. The team has appeared in seven postseasons and has won two league pennants. Luis Gonzalez holds many franchise career and single-season batting records. Randy Johnson owns many franchise career and single-season pitching records. Corbin Carroll is the active leader MLB triples after only 587 games played.

Having won the World Series in 2001, the franchise's fourth season in existence, the Diamondbacks hold the distinction of being the fastest MLB expansion team to win a championship. In addition, three no-hitters have been thrown in franchise history.

Statistics are current through the 2026 season.

== Individual career records ==
These are records of players with the best performance in particular statistical categories during their tenure with the Diamondbacks.

=== Career batting ===
Career batting records
Statistic	Player	Record	Diamondbacks career	Ref
Batting average	Luis Gonzalez	.298	1999–2006	
On-base percentage	Paul Goldschmidt	.398	2011–2018	
Slugging percentage	Paul Goldschmidt	.532	2011–2018	
On-base plus slugging	Paul Goldschmidt	.930	2011–2018	
Runs	Luis Gonzalez	780	1999–2006	
Plate appearances	Luis Gonzalez	5,246	1999–2006	
At bats	Luis Gonzalez	4,488	1999–2006	
Hits	Luis Gonzalez	1,337	1999–2006	
Total bases	Luis Gonzalez	2,373	1999–2006	
Singles	Luis Gonzalez	776	1999–2006	
Doubles	Luis Gonzalez	310	1999–2006	
Triples	Corbin Carroll	60	2022–present	
Home runs	Luis Gonzalez	224	1999–2006	
Runs batted in	Luis Gonzalez	774	1999–2006	
Walks	Paul Goldschmidt	655	2011–2018	
Strikeouts	Paul Goldschmidt	1,059	2011–2018	
Stolen bases	Tony Womack	182	1999–2003	
Games played	Ketel Marte	1,195	2017–2026	

=== Career pitching ===
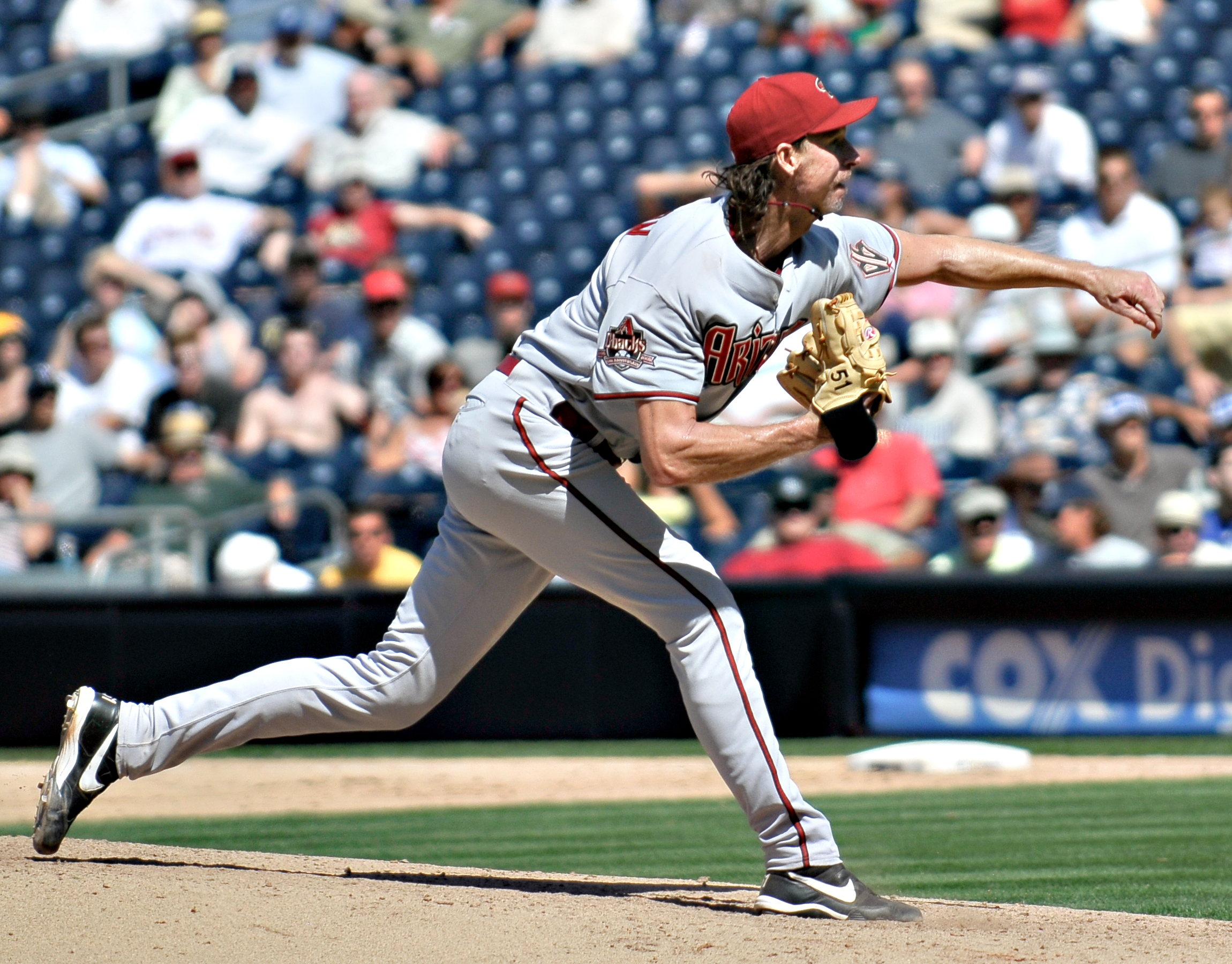
Randy Johnson holds ten Diamondbacks career pitching records, including most wins, most strikeouts and lowest ERA.

Career pitching records
Statistic	Player	Record	Diamondbacks career	Ref(s)
Wins	Randy Johnson	118	1999–2004; 2007–2008	
Losses	Merrill Kelly	63	2019–2025, 2026–	
Win–loss percentage	Curt Schilling	.674	2000–2003	
Earned run average^{[a]}	Randy Johnson	2.83	1999–2004; 2007–2008	
Saves	José Valverde	98	2003–2007	
Strikeouts	Randy Johnson	2,077	1999–2004; 2007–2008	
Shutouts	Randy Johnson	14	1999–2004; 2007–2008	
Games	Andrew Chafin	380	2014–2020, 2023	
Innings pitched	Randy Johnson	1,630⅓	1999–2004; 2007–2008	
Games started	Randy Johnson	232	1999–2004; 2007–2008	
Games finished	José Valverde	181	2003–2007	
Complete games	Randy Johnson	38	1999–2004; 2007–2008	
Walks	Brandon Webb	435	2003–2009	
Hits allowed	Randy Johnson	1,325	1999–2004; 2007–2008	
Wild pitches	Brandon Webb	56	2003–2009	
Hit batsmen	Randy Johnson	74	1999–2004; 2007–2008	

== Individual single-season records ==
These are records of Diamondbacks players with the best performance in particular statistical categories during a single season.

=== Single-season batting ===
Single-season batting records
Statistic	Player	Record	Season	Ref(s)
Batting average	Luis Gonzalez	.336	1999	
Home runs	Luis Gonzalez	57	2001	
RBI	Luis Gonzalez	142	2001	
RBI	Matt Williams	142	1999	
Runs	Jay Bell	132	1999	
Hits	Luis Gonzalez	206	1999	
Singles	Jean Segura	135	2016	
Doubles	Luis Gonzalez	52	2006	
Triples	Corbin Carroll	17	2025	
Stolen bases	Tony Womack	72	1999	
At bats	Jean Segura	637	2016	
Slugging percentage	Luis Gonzalez	.688	2001	
Extra-base hits	Luis Gonzalez	100	2001	
Total bases	Luis Gonzalez	419	2001	
On-base percentage	Paul Goldschmidt	.435	2015	
On-base plus slugging	Luis Gonzalez	1.117	2001	
Walks	Paul Goldschmidt	118	2015	
Strikeouts	Mark Reynolds	223	2009	

=== Single-season pitching ===
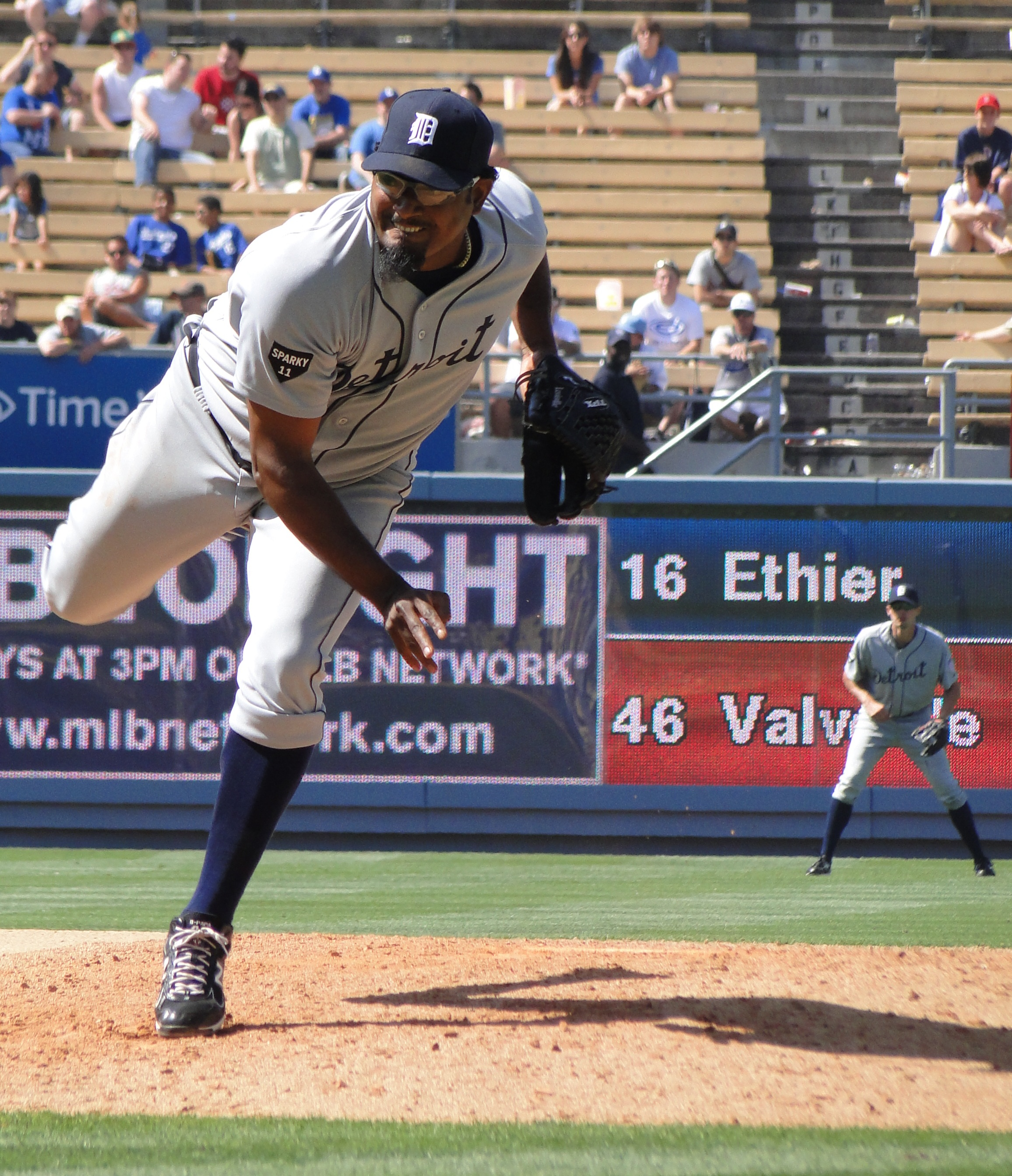
José Valverde holds the Diamondbacks single-season saves record with 47 in 2007.

Single-season pitching records
Statistic	Player	Record	Season	Ref(s)
Wins	Randy Johnson	24	2002	
Losses	Rodrigo López	16	2010	
Losses	Brandon Webb	16	2004	
Strikeouts	Randy Johnson	372	2001	
ERA	Randy Johnson	2.32	2002	
Earned runs allowed	Liván Hernández	112	2007	
Hits allowed	Liván Hernández	247	2007	
Shutouts	Randy Johnson	4	2002	
Saves	José Valverde	47	2007	
Games	Óscar Villarreal	86	2003	
Games started	Randy Johnson	35	1999, 2000, 2002, 2004	
Games started	Curt Schilling	35	2001, 2002	
Games started	Brandon Webb	35	2004	
Complete games	Randy Johnson	12	1999	
Innings pitched	Randy Johnson	271.2	1999	

== Team single-game records ==
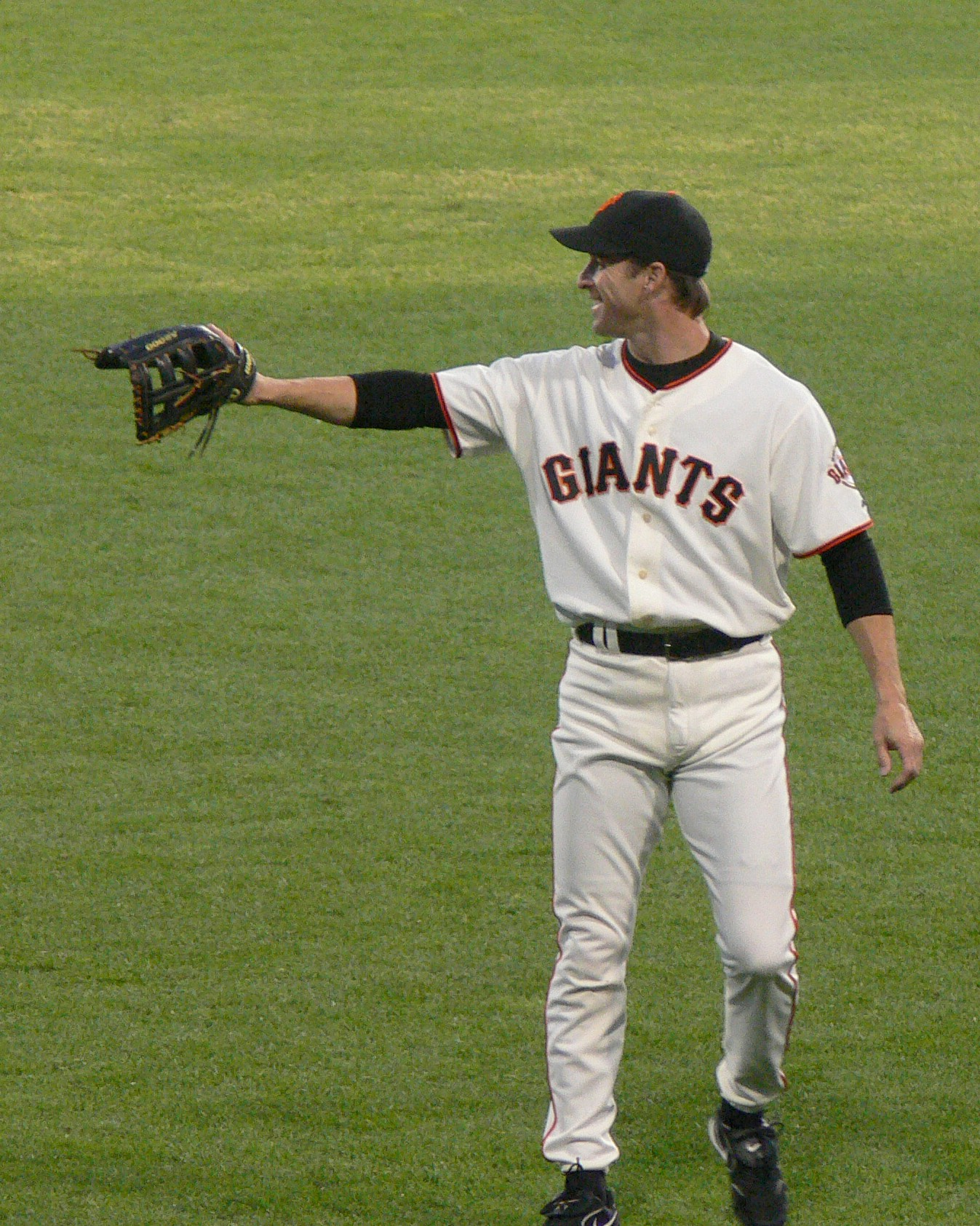
Steve Finley hit three doubles during the Diamondbacks' franchise record eight-double game on June 2, 1999.

These are records of Diamondbacks teams with the best performance in particular statistical categories during a single game.

=== Single-game batting ===
Single-game batting records
Statistic	Record	Opponent	Date
Home runs hit	8	Philadelphia Phillies	June 10, 2019
Runs scored	20	San Diego Padres	July 7, 2018
Hits	22 (3x)	Washington Nationals (most recent)	July 30, 2024 (most recent)
Doubles	8	Montreal Expos	June 2, 1999
Triples	4 (5×)	Colorado Rockies (most recent)	October 4, 2017 (most recent)
Runners left on base	16 (2×)	Los Angeles Dodgers (most recent)	April 30, 2007 (most recent)
Strikeouts	18	San Diego Padres	April 25, 2007
Stolen bases	7	New York Mets	May 19, 2000

=== Single-game pitching ===
Single-game pitching records
Statistic	Record	Opponent	Date
Hits allowed, inning	10	St. Louis Cardinals	September 23, 2002
Runs allowed, inning	11	Texas Rangers	June 23, 1998
Home runs allowed, inning	3 (5×)	Kansas City Royals (most recent)	May 23, 2022 (most recent)
Strikeouts	20	Cincinnati Reds	May 8, 2001

== Team season records ==
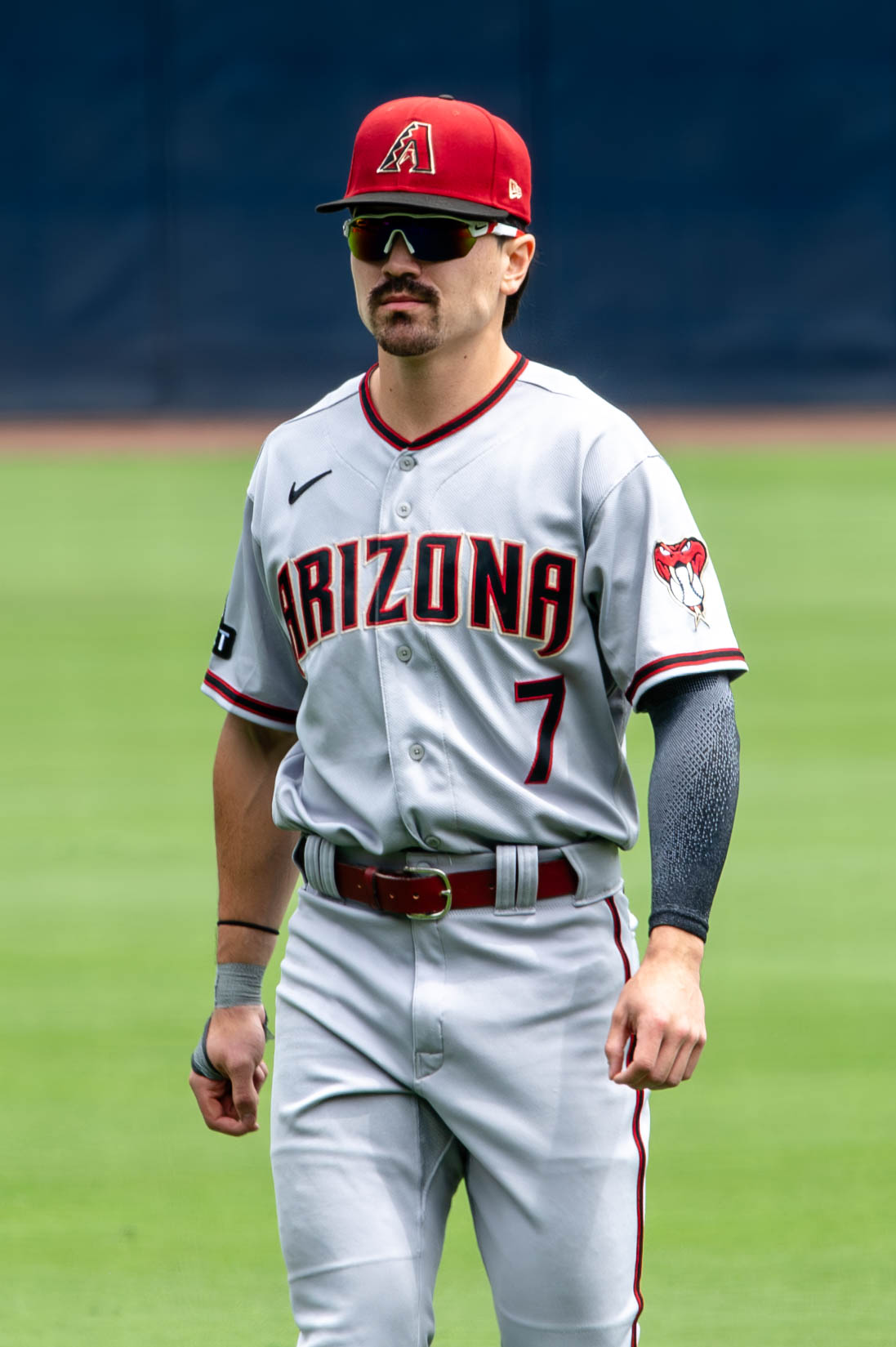
Corbin Carroll led the team in stolen bases in 2023, stealing 54 bases of the Diamondbacks' franchise record of 166 that season.

These are records of Diamondbacks teams with the best and worst performances in particular statistical categories during a single season.

=== Season batting ===
Season batting records
Statistic	Record	Season
Home runs	220	2017, 2019
Runs	908	1999
Hits	1,566	1999
Doubles	331	2006
Triples	56	2016
Runners left on base	1,211	2002
Strikeouts	1,529	2010
Stolen bases	166	2023

=== Season pitching ===
Season pitching records
Statistic	Record	Season
Hits allowed	1,580	2005
Runs allowed	899	2004
Home runs allowed	232	2021
Strikeouts	1,482	2017
Shutouts	13	2001

== Team all-time statistics ==
As of the end of the 2026 season

Team all-time statistics
Statistic	Record
Home runs	4,925
Runs	21,035
Hits	39,862
Batting average	.254
ERA	4.28
Runs allowed	21,305

== Notes ==
- ^{a} Earned run average is calculated as 9 × (ER ÷ IP), where $ER$ is earned runs and $IP$ is innings pitched.

== See also ==
- Baseball statistics
- History of the Arizona Diamondbacks
- Arizona Diamondbacks award winners and league leaders
- List of Arizona Diamondbacks no-hitters
