= Jacob Gonzalez (baseball, born 1998) =

American baseball player (born 1998)

- First baseman
- Born: June 26, 1998 (age 28); Scottsdale, Arizona, U.S.
- Bats: Right Throws: Right

Jacob Christopher Gonzalez (born June 26, 1998) is an American former professional baseball first baseman.

== Career ==
Gonzalez attended Chaparral High School.

=== San Francisco Giants ===
Gonzalez was drafted by the San Francisco Giants in the 2nd round, with the 58th overall selection, of the 2017 Major League Baseball draft. He made his professional debut with the rookie-level Arizona League Giants, hitting .339 in 46 games.

Gonzalez played 2018 with the Single-A Augusta GreenJackets, making 122 appearances and hitting .227/.296/.331 with eight home runs, 45 RBI, and seven stolen bases. Returning to Augusta in 2019, he played in 125 games, slashing .241/.312/.368 with 10 home runs and 57 RBI. Gonzalez did not play in a game in 2020 due to the cancellation of the minor league season because of the COVID-19 pandemic.

=== Pittsburgh Pirates ===
On December 8, 2021, Gonzalez was selected by the Pittsburgh Pirates in the minor league phase of the Rule 5 draft. He split the 2022 campaign between the Single-A Bradenton Marauders and High-A Greensboro Grasshoppers. In 112 appearances split between the two affiliates, Gonzalez batted .305/.377/.459 with career-highs in home runs (13) and RBI (61).

In 2023, Gonzalez played in 86 games for the Double–A Altoona Curve, hitting .237/.293/.351 with 8 home runs and 44 RBI. He elected free agency following the season on November 6, 2023.

=== Philadelphia Phillies ===
On December 11, 2023, Gonzalez signed a minor league contract with the Philadelphia Phillies. He was released by the Phillies organization on March 20, 2024.

== Personal life ==
His father is Luis Gonzalez.
