= List of Major League Baseball career at bat leaders =

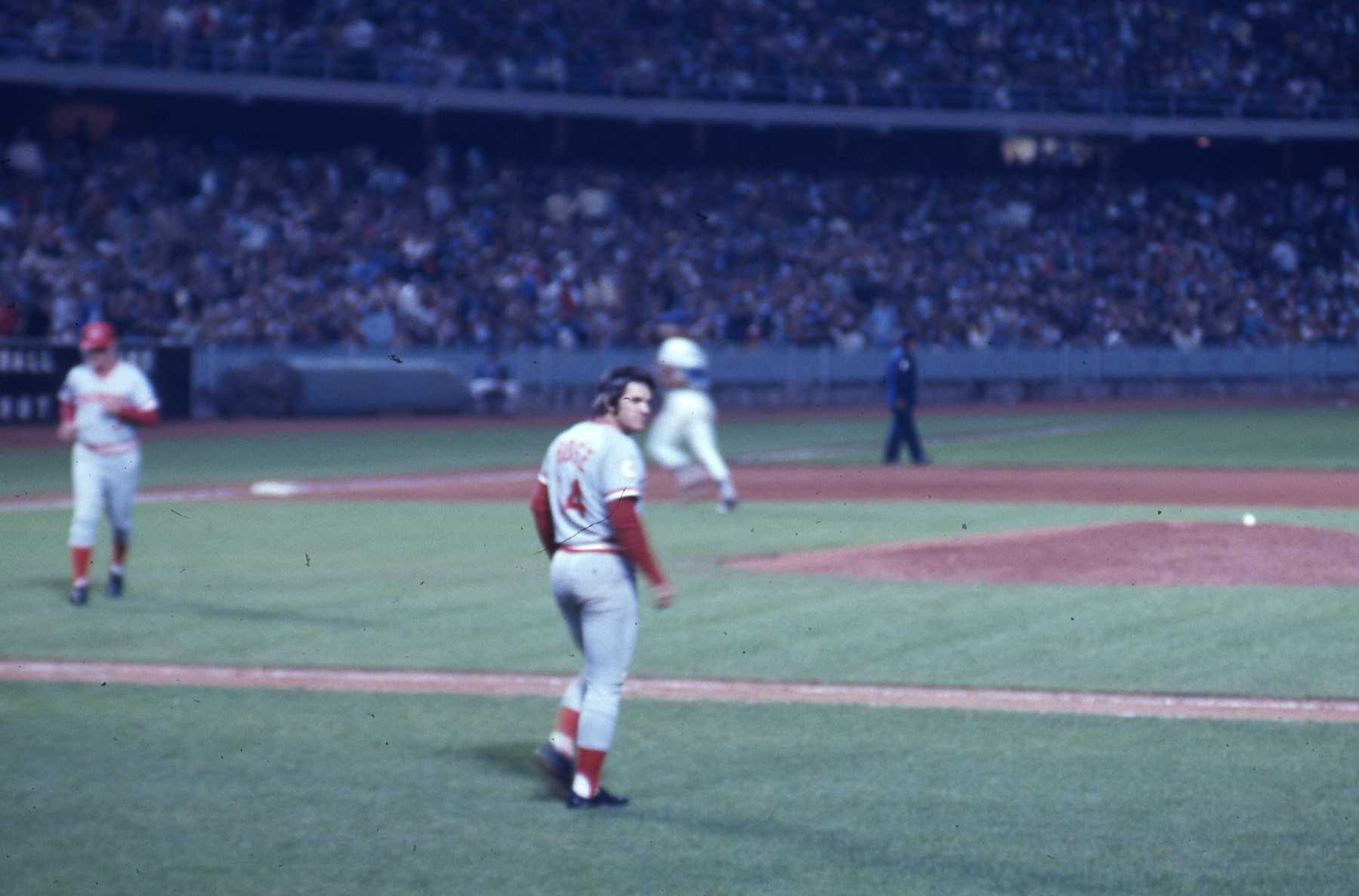
Pete Rose, the all-time leader in at-bats.

In baseball, an at bat (AB) or time at bat is a batter's turn batting against a pitcher. An at bat is different from a plate appearance. A batter is credited with a plate appearance no matter what happens during his turn at bat. A batter is not credited with an at bat if he:

- Receives a base on balls (BB). (Note: In 1887, Major League Baseball counted bases on balls as hits. The result was high batting averages, including some near .500, and the experiment was abandoned the following season.)
- Is hit by a pitch (HBP).
- Hits a sacrifice fly or a sacrifice bunt (also known as sacrifice hit).
- Is awarded first base due to interference or obstruction, usually by the catcher.
- Is replaced by another hitter before his at bat is completed, in which case the plate appearance and any related statistics go to the pinch hitter (unless he is replaced with two strikes and his replacement completes a strikeout, in which case the at bat and strikeout are still charged to the first batter).

At bats are used to calculate certain statistics, including batting average, on-base percentage, and slugging percentage. A player can only qualify for the season-ending rankings in these categories if he accumulates 502 plate appearances during the season.

Pete Rose is the all-time leader in at bats with 14,053, and the only player in MLB history with more than 12,400 at bats. Only 30 MLB players have reached 10,000 career at bats. As of September 27, 2026, only one active players is in the top 100 of career at-bats. The active leader is Freddie Freeman, 95th all-time with 8,693.

== Key ==
**Rank**	Rank among leaders in career at-bats. A blank field indicates a tie.
**Player (2026 ABs)**	Name (at-bats in 2026)
**AB**	Career at-bats
*	Elected to National Baseball Hall of Fame.
**Bold**	Active player. (Note: A player is considered inactive if he has announced his retirement or not played for a full season.)

== List ==
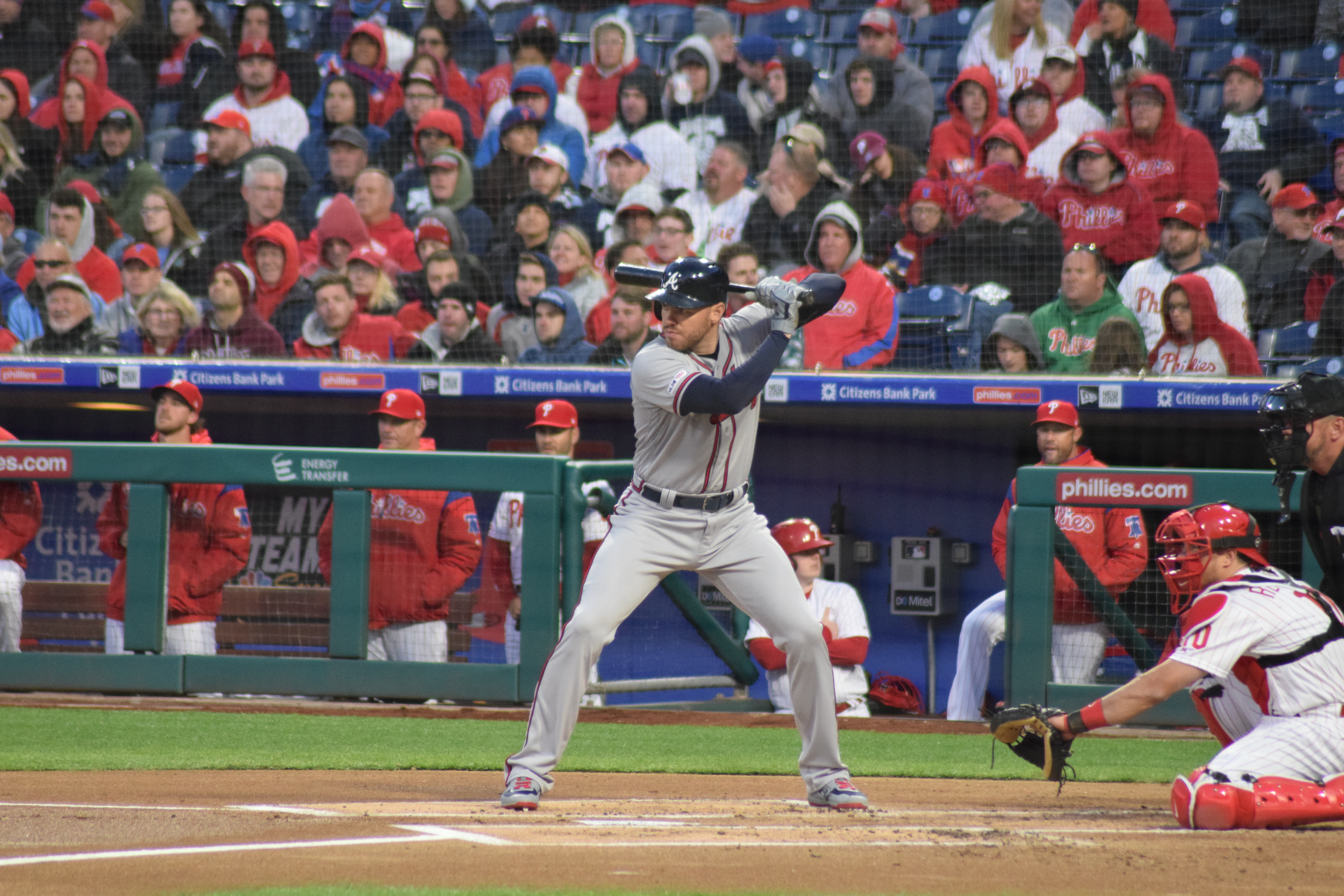
Freddie Freeman, the active leader and 95th all-time in career at bats.

- Stats updated as of September 27, 2026.

Rank	Player (2026 ABs)	AB
1	Pete Rose	14,053
2	Hank Aaron*	12,364
3	Carl Yastrzemski*	11,988
4	Cal Ripken Jr.*	11,551
5	Ty Cobb*	11,440
6	Albert Pujols	11,421
7	Eddie Murray*	11,336
8	Derek Jeter*	11,195
9	Adrián Beltré*	11,068
10	Robin Yount*	11,008
11	Dave Winfield*	11,003
12	Stan Musial*	10,972
13	Rickey Henderson*	10,961
14	Willie Mays*	10,881
15	Craig Biggio*	10,876
16	Paul Molitor*	10,835
17	Brooks Robinson*	10,654
18	Omar Vizquel	10,586
19	Alex Rodriguez	10,566
20	Rafael Palmeiro	10,472
21	Honus Wagner*	10,439
22	Miguel Cabrera	10,356
23	George Brett*	10,349
24	Lou Brock*	10,332
25	Cap Anson*	10,281
26	Luis Aparicio*	10,230
27	Tris Speaker*	10,195
28	Al Kaline*	10,116
29	Rabbit Maranville*	10,078
30	Frank Robinson*	10,006
31	Eddie Collins*	9,949
32	Ichiro Suzuki*	9,934
33	Andre Dawson*	9,927
34	Harold Baines*	9,908
35	Reggie Jackson*	9,864
36	Barry Bonds	9,847
37	Ken Griffey Jr.*	9,801
38	Tony Pérez*	9,778
39	Carlos Beltrán*	9,768
40	Johnny Damon	9,736
41	Rusty Staub	9,720
42	Vada Pinson	9,645
43	Iván Rodríguez*	9,592
44	Nap Lajoie*	9,589
45	Sam Crawford*	9,570
46	Jake Beckley*	9,551
47	Paul Waner*	9,459
48	Mel Ott*	9,456
49	Roberto Clemente*	9,454
50	Ernie Banks*	9,421

Rank	Player (2026 ABs)	AB
51	Bill Buckner	9,397
	Steve Finley	9,397
53	Ozzie Smith*	9,396
54	Max Carey*	9,363
55	Dave Parker*	9,358
56	Billy Williams*	9,350
57	Rod Carew*	9,315
58	Jimmy Rollins	9,294
59	Tony Gwynn*	9,288
60	Joe Morgan*	9,277
61	Sam Rice*	9,269
62	Nellie Fox*	9,232
63	Gary Sheffield	9,217
64	Wade Boggs*	9,180
65	Willie Davis	9,174
66	Luis Gonzalez	9,157
67	Doc Cramer	9,140
68	Frankie Frisch*	9,112
69	Zack Wheat*	9,106
70	Lave Cross	9,084
71	Roberto Alomar*	9,073
72	Al Oliver	9,049
73	George Davis*	9,045
74	Bill Dahlen	9,036
75	Dwight Evans	8,996
76	Buddy Bell	8,995
77	Graig Nettles	8,986
78	Chipper Jones*	8,984
79	Darrell Evans	8,973
80	Gary Gaetti	8,951
81	Tim Raines*	8,872
82	Charlie Gehringer*	8,860
83	Torii Hunter	8,857
84	Luke Appling*	8,856
85	Steve Garvey	8,835
86	Tommy Corcoran	8,824
87	Sammy Sosa	8,813
88	Harry Hooper*	8,785
89	Robinson Canó	8,773
90	Al Simmons*	8,759
91	Fred McGriff*	8,757
92	Carlton Fisk*	8,756
93	Mickey Vernon	8,731
94	Dave Concepción	8,723
95	**Freddie Freeman (579)**	8,693
96	Bert Campaneris	8,684
97	Ted Simmons*	8,680
98	Julio Franco	8,677
99	Chili Davis	8,673
100	Goose Goslin*	8,656
