= Luis Gonzalez (outfielder, born 1967) =

American baseball player (born 1967)

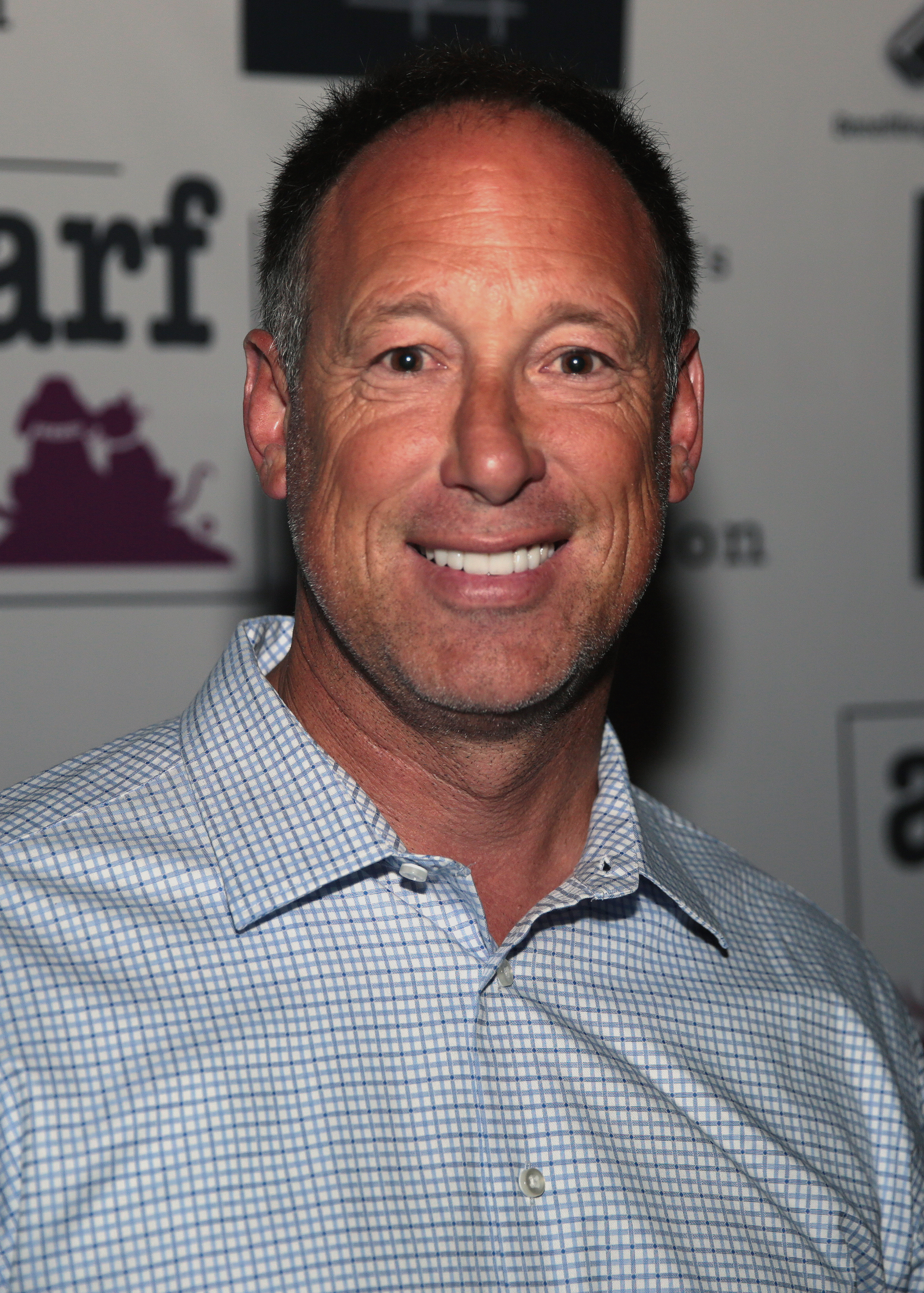
- Gonzalez in 2017
- Left fielder
- Born: September 3, 1967 (age 59); Tampa, Florida, U.S.
- Batted: Left Threw: Right

MLB debut
- September 4, 1990, for the Houston Astros

Last MLB appearance
- September 28, 2008, for the Florida Marlins

MLB statistics
- Batting average: .283
- Hits: 2,591
- Home runs: 354
- Runs batted in: 1,439
- Stats at Baseball Reference

Teams
- Houston Astros (1990–1995); Chicago Cubs (1995–1996); Houston Astros (1997); Detroit Tigers (1998); Arizona Diamondbacks (1999–2006); Los Angeles Dodgers (2007); Florida Marlins (2008)

Career highlights and awards
- 5× All-Star (1999, 2001–2003, 2005); World Series champion (2001); Silver Slugger Award (2001); Arizona Diamondbacks No. 20 retired; Arizona Diamondbacks Hall of Fame

Luis Emilio Gonzalez (born September 3, 1967), nicknamed "Gonzo", is an American former baseball outfielder who played 19 seasons in Major League Baseball (MLB) for seven teams. Gonzalez spent his best years with the Arizona Diamondbacks and was one of the most popular players in the organization's history. His game-winning hit in Game 7 of the 2001 World Series against New York Yankees closer Mariano Rivera clinched the Diamondbacks' first and only World Series championship. Gonzalez was a five-time All-Star and won a Silver Slugger Award in 2001. In addition to good power (354 career home runs), Gonzalez was known as an exceptional gap hitter. His 596 career doubles currently rank 19th on the all-time MLB list.

After retiring from baseball in 2008, Gonzalez joined the Diamondbacks' front office in 2009 as a special assistant to the president. The following year, the team retired his uniform number #20, making him the first player so honored by the Diamondbacks.

== Early life ==
Gonzalez grew up in the West Tampa neighborhood of Tampa, Florida in a Cuban-American household. He graduated from Thomas Jefferson High School in 1985 along with childhood friend Tino Martinez.

== College career ==
After high school, he attended the University of South Alabama, where he earned Baseball America's All-Freshman Second Team honors. He was drafted by the Houston Astros in the fourth round of the 1988 amateur draft. Gonzalez played American Legion Baseball for Post 248. Other Post 248 alumni include Lou Piniella, Tony La Russa, Tino Martinez, and Gary Sheffield.

== Professional career ==
=== Houston Astros (1988–1995) ===
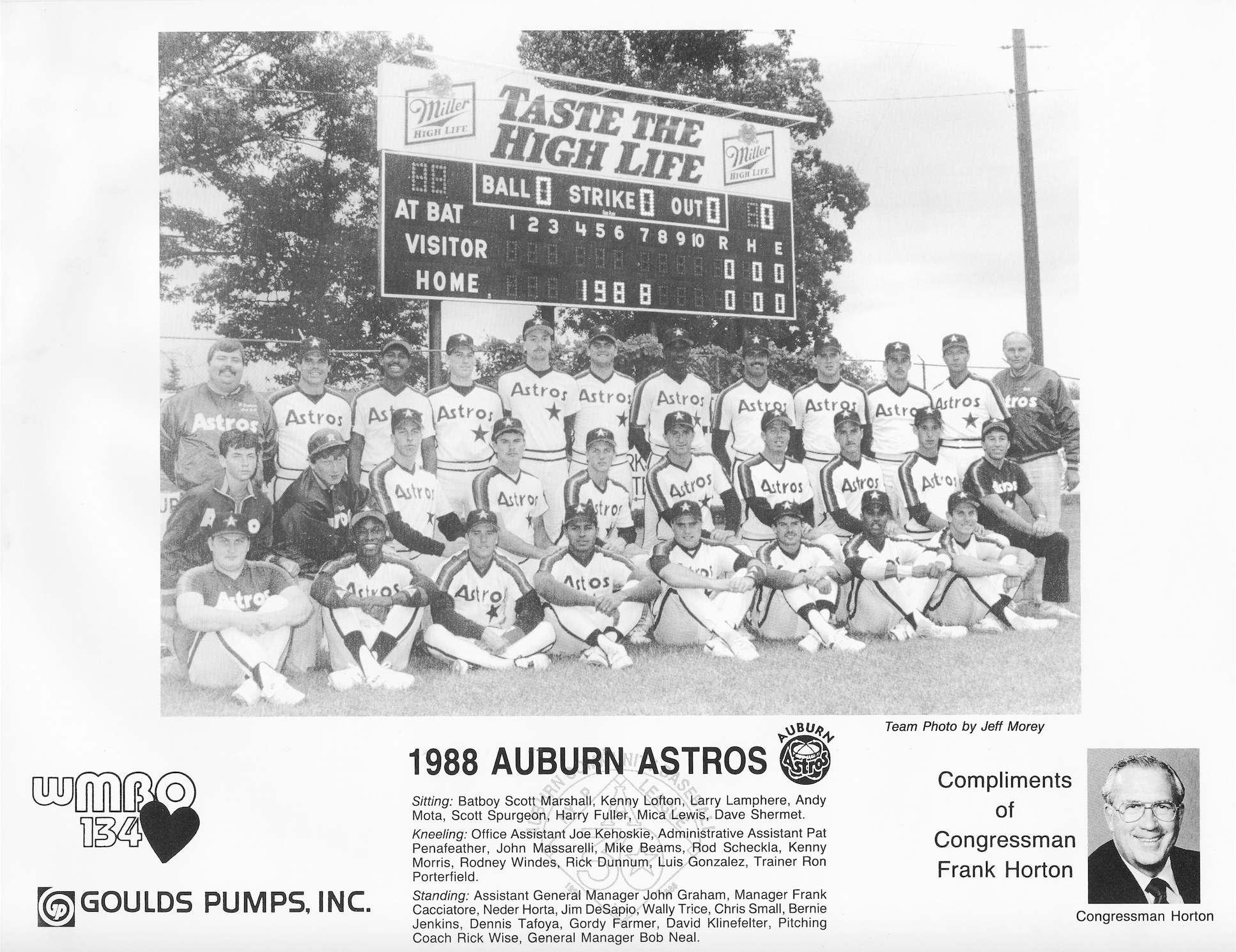
1988 Auburn Astros team photo

Gonzalez was drafted by the Houston Astros in the 4th round of the 1988 June draft. After signing, he was assigned to the short-season Class A Auburn Astros of the New York–Penn League, where Kenny Lofton, the Astros' 17th-round pick in 1988, was also making his pro debut. Gonzalez hit .312 with 5 home runs and 10 doubles in 39 games for Auburn before being promoted to the Asheville Tourists to finish the season.

Gonzalez made his major league debut on September 4, 1990. He finished the rest of the 1990 season with four hits (two doubles). The year of 1991 became the first full season of Gonzalez's career. During 1991, he batted .254 with 13 home runs and 69 RBI. In 1992, he batted .243 with 10 home runs and 55 RBI. In 1993, he batted .300 with 15 home runs, 72 RBI, and an NL leading 10 sacrifice flies. In 1994, he batted .273 with eight homers and 67 RBI. His 1995 season began with a .258 batting average, six homers and 35 RBI.

=== Chicago Cubs (1995–1996) ===
Gonzalez along with Scott Servais were traded to the Chicago Cubs for Rick Wilkins. Gonzalez finished the 1995 season with the Cubs by batting .290 with seven homers and 34 RBI. Overall in 1995, Gonzalez had a .276 average, 13 homers and 69 RBI combined while he played with the Astros and Cubs. In 1996, Gonzalez batted .271 with 15 homers and 79 RBI.

=== Second stint with the Houston Astros (1997) ===
Gonzalez signed a one-year deal to return to the Astros in 1997. During 1997, he batted .258 with 10 homers and 68 RBI.

=== Detroit Tigers (1998) ===
Gonzalez signed a one-year deal for the Tigers in 1998. In 1998, he batted .267 with 23 homers and 71 RBI. He hit the first home run at Tropicana Field (the home stadium of the expansion Tampa Bay Devil Rays) on Opening Day.

=== Arizona Diamondbacks (1999–2006) ===
In 1999, Gonzalez was traded to the Diamondbacks for Karim García. He had a strong debut season for Arizona on his way to becoming a star during his tenure with the team, leading the NL in hits with 206 and posting a .336 batting average to help them win the National League's western division. Arizona would fall to the New York Mets in the divisional playoff series. Gonzalez was selected to his first All-Star Team in 1999. In 2000, the Diamondbacks fell to third place in their division, but Gonzalez had a fine season, blasting 31 home runs among his 192 hits, while hitting .311 and driving in 114 runs.

In 2001, Gonzalez astonished many when he hit 57 home runs, his personal best for one season and almost twice as many as he hit in any other season. This included a record nine home runs in his first 10 games (shared with Mike Schmidt in 1976). The total is the third-most in National League history for a left-handed batter (behind Barry Bonds's record 73, which also came in 2001, and Ryan Howard, who hit 58 in 2006). Gonzalez was selected to his second All-Star Team and won the Home Run Derby at the mid-season classic. He ranked second in the National League in hits with 198, while batting .325 and posting career highs in runs (128), RBI (142) and walks (100). He finished third in the 2001 NL Most Valuable Player voting.

The Diamondbacks reached the World Series that year and faced off against the New York Yankees, who featured Gonzalez's childhood friend Tino Martinez starting at first base. In a climactic moment, Gonzalez came to the plate in the bottom of the 9th inning of game 7, with the score even at 2–2, the bases loaded and one out. The Yankee pitcher was Mariano Rivera, widely regarded as one of the best closers of all time (Rivera had never blown a save chance in a World Series before, or since). Gonzalez swung at Rivera's 0–1 pitch and hit the game-winning bloop single into left field that sealed the first franchise World Series title for Arizona.

He was also selected to All-Star Teams in 2002 and 2003. During the 2002 season, Gonzalez received publicity as a piece of gum chewed by Gonzalez during a spring training game was sold for $10,000 on April 15, 2002. The buyer was Curt Mueller, owner of Mueller Sports Medicine Inc., manufacturer of the gum, Quench. In 2003, Gonzalez topped .300 (.304) for the fourth time in his first five seasons in Arizona, and eclipsed 100 RBI (104) for the fifth consecutive season.

On May 22, 2004, Gonzalez got his 2,000th career hit in a game against the Florida Marlins, though his season ended early when he had Tommy John surgery in August. In 2005, he was selected to his fifth All-Star Team. On April 18, 2006, he got his 500th career double, becoming the 20th player in Major League history to hit 500 doubles and 300 home runs. On May 13, 2006, he passed Babe Ruth for 38th place all-time for the most doubles hit in league history.

On June 15, 2006, The Arizona Republic printed an interview by columnist E. J. Montini with Diamondback managing general partner Ken Kendrick. In the interview, Kendrick mentioned whispers of alleged steroid use by Gonzalez; in the interview Kendrick never directly accused Gonzalez of using performance-enhancing drugs. The interview came eight days after Diamondback relief pitcher Jason Grimsley was released by the team after the team learned that federal agents had searched his home looking for evidence that he was a distributor of human growth hormone and other performance-enhancing drugs. On June 16, 2006, an angry Gonzalez called a press conference to deny that he had ever used steroids.

=== Los Angeles Dodgers (2007) ===
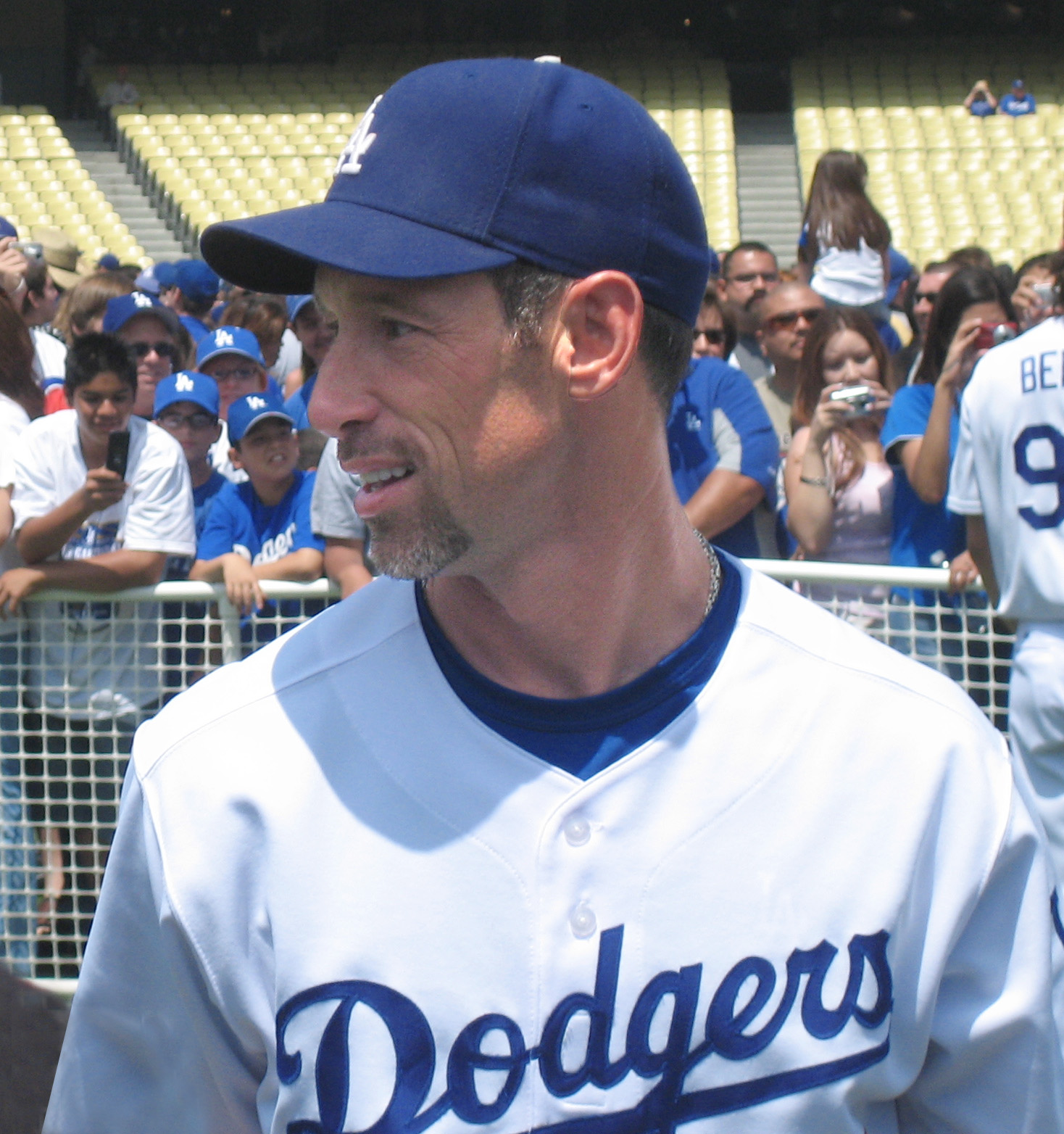
Luis Gonzalez as a Dodger.

On September 14, 2006, the Diamondbacks announced that they would not pick up the team option of $10 million to re-sign Gonzalez after the 2006 season. On December 7, Gonzalez signed a one-year contract with the Los Angeles Dodgers for $7 million for the 2007 season.

Gonzalez hit his first home run as a Dodger on Sunday, April 8, 2007, versus Barry Zito of the San Francisco Giants. He hit two home runs in that game. In his only season with the Dodgers, he was productive offensively, but struggled defensively. Many times throughout the season, he was benched for a defensive replacement. Towards the end of the season, he was benched in favor of Matt Kemp, a top Dodger prospect at the time. He was upset about it and publicly said he was not interested in returning to the Dodgers before the season was even over. He hit .278 with 15 home runs and 68 RBI in 2007.

Gonzalez was the first player to hit a home run off of the touch tank in Tropicana Field, on June 24.

=== Florida Marlins (2008) ===
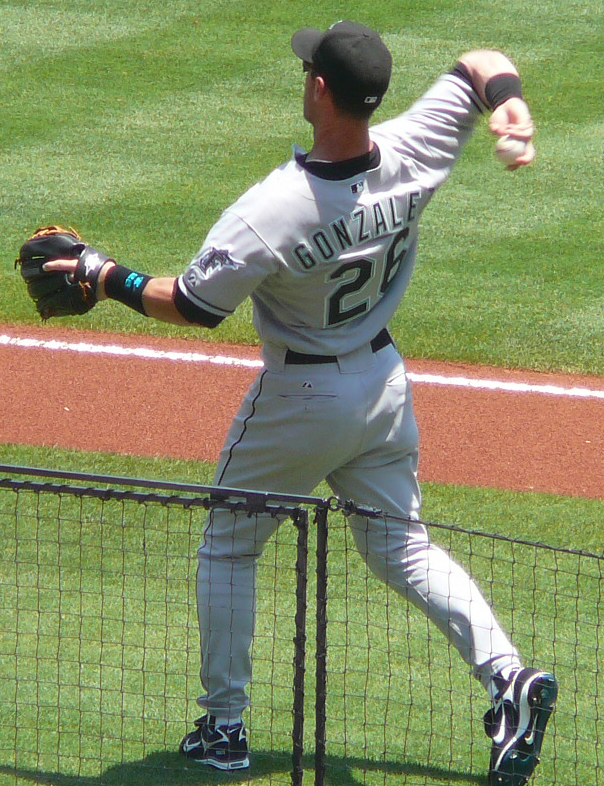
Gonzalez with the Marlins in 2008.

On February 7, 2008, he signed with the Florida Marlins. The deal was reportedly worth $2 million for one season. Gonzalez played in 136 games for the Marlins in 2008, batting .261.

=== Retirement ===
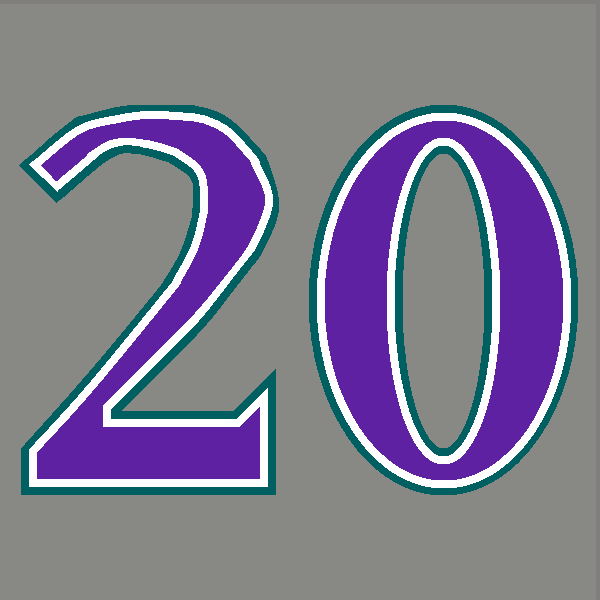
Luis Gonzalez's number 20 was retired by the Arizona Diamondbacks in 2010.

Gonzalez announced his retirement on August 29, 2009, and joined the Diamondbacks front office as a special assistant to the president. In 2010, Gonzalez's number 20 jersey was retired on August 7, making him the first player to have his number retired by the team.

=== Career statistics ===
In 2,591 games over 19 seasons, Gonzalez posted a .283 batting average (2,591-for-9,157) with 1,412 runs, 596 doubles, 68 triples, 354 home runs, 1,439 RBI, 1,155 bases on balls, 128 stolen bases, .367 on-base percentage and .479 slugging percentage. He finished his career with a .986 fielding percentage primarily as a left fielder. In 24 postseason games, he hit .253 (22-for-87) with 12 runs, 3 doubles, 4 home runs, 12 RBI and 11 walks.

== Other activities ==
With businessman and entrepreneur Anthony Conti, Gonzalez founded IsTalking, LLC, a Phoenix-based company that develops new social networking Web sites exclusively for college students. The company launched a new social network with Arizona State University called ASUIsTalking.com. He has also formed a partnership with the ASU Alumni Association to be the exclusive online social-network for its 250,000 members.

Gonzalez has served as a color commentator on ESPN Radio's broadcasts of National League Division Series games in recent years, and also worked on Fox Sports' television broadcast of the 2006 National League Championship Series.

Gonzalez formerly owned and operated a restaurant called Gonzo's, located in oldtown/downtown Gilbert, Arizona. After several name changes, it closed in 2009. In 2012, Postino opened its 3rd Arizona location in its place. Gonzalez is a prominent member of the Republican Party. As a resident of Arizona, he wrote a letter of endorsement for Arizona's Junior Senator, Jon Kyl, who won his bid for re-election in 2006. He endorsed Arizona's other Senator, 2008 GOP Presidential Nominee John McCain, over former congressman J.D. Hayworth in 2010. In 2022 he endorsed Kari Lake for the 2022 Arizona gubernatorial election. Gonzalez was the Celebrity face for a cornfield maze in Queen Creek, Arizona for the Schnepf Farms' annual Celebrity Maze. Gonzalez is the first local celebrity featured; Oprah Winfrey, Larry King, and Jay Leno were previously featured.

Gonzalez serves as a member of the board of the Baseball Assistance Team, a 501(c)(3) non-profit organization dedicated to helping former Major League, Minor League, and Negro league players through financial and medical hardships.

The Diamondbacks built a Little League ballfield in his honor at Tempe Beach Park in Tempe, Arizona.

Gonzalez was inducted into the Hispanic Heritage Baseball Museum Hall of Fame on July 9, 2011, at the MLB All-Star Fan Fest in Phoenix.

== Personal life ==
Gonzalez lives in Scottsdale, Arizona. He and his family (wife Christine and triplets Megan, Jacob, and Alyssa) are residents of Scottsdale. Jacob was selected by the San Francisco Giants in the 2017 MLB draft.

== See also ==
- Arizona Diamondbacks award winners and league leaders
- Houston Astros award winners and league leaders
- List of Arizona Diamondbacks team records
- List of Major League Baseball career assists leaders
- List of Major League Baseball career at bat leaders
- List of Major League Baseball career bases on balls leaders
- List of Major League Baseball career double plays leaders
- List of Major League Baseball career doubles leaders
- List of Major League Baseball career extra base hits leaders
- List of Major League Baseball career fielding errors leaders
- List of Major League Baseball career games played as a left fielder leaders
- List of Major League Baseball career games played as an outfielder leaders
- List of Major League Baseball career games played leaders
- List of Major League Baseball career home run leaders
- List of Major League Baseball career hit by pitch leaders
- List of Major League Baseball career hits leaders
- List of Major League Baseball career intentional bases on balls leaders
- List of Major League Baseball career plate appearance leaders
- List of Major League Baseball career putouts leaders
- List of Major League Baseball career runs batted in leaders
- List of Major League Baseball career runs scored leaders
- List of Major League Baseball career times on base leaders
- List of Major League Baseball career total bases leaders
- List of Major League Baseball career WAR leaders
- List of Major League Baseball doubles records
- List of Major League Baseball hit records
- List of Major League Baseball players to hit for the cycle
- List of people from Tampa, Florida
- 50 home run club

Awards and achievements
| Preceded by Richard Hidalgo; Barry Bonds | National League Player of the Month; April 2001; June 2001 | Succeeded by Barry Bonds; Jeff Bagwell |
| Preceded by Art Howe | Houston Astros longest hitting streak 1997—2000 (tied) | Succeeded by Tony Eusebio |
| Preceded by Eric Chavez | Hitting for the cycle July 5, 2000 | Succeeded by Damion Easley |
