= Corbin Carroll =

American baseball player (born 2000)

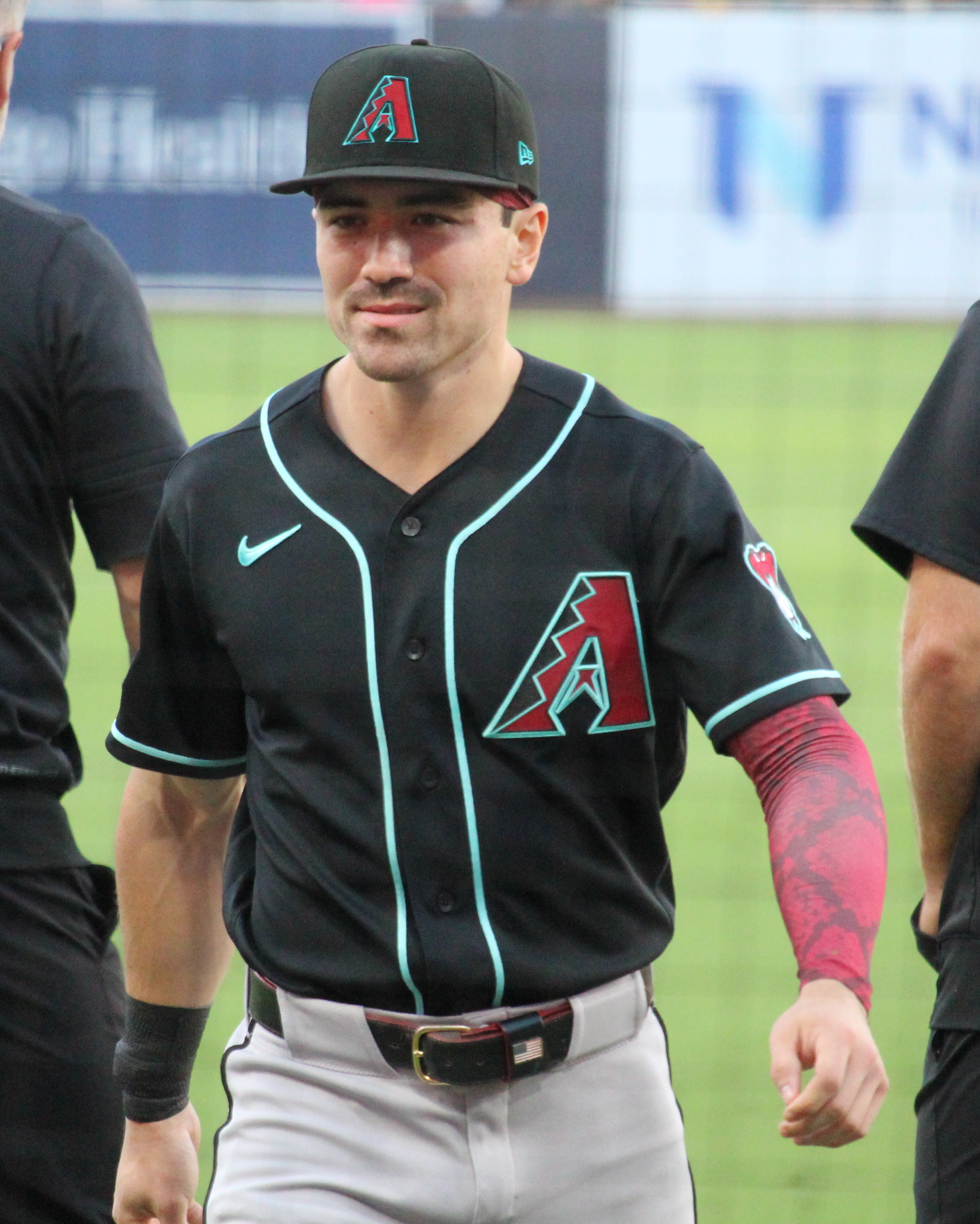
- Carroll with the Diamondbacks in 2026

Arizona Diamondbacks – No. 7
- Outfielder
- Born: August 21, 2000 (age 26); Seattle, Washington, U.S.
- Bats: Left Throws: Left

MLB debut
- August 29, 2022, for the Arizona Diamondbacks

MLB statistics (through 2026 season)
- Batting average: .253
- Home runs: 104
- Runs batted in: 326
- Stolen bases: 144
- Stats at Baseball Reference

Teams
- Arizona Diamondbacks (2022–present)

Career highlights and awards
- 3× All-Star (2023, 2025, 2026); All-MLB First Team (2023); NL Rookie of the Year (2023); Gold Glove Award (2026); Silver Slugger Award (2025)
Medals
Men's baseball
Representing United States
COPABE U-18 Pan-American Championship
Gold medal – first place	2018 Panama	Team

Corbin Franklin Carroll (born August 21, 2000) is an American professional baseball outfielder for the Arizona Diamondbacks of Major League Baseball (MLB). The Diamondbacks selected Carroll 16th overall in the first round of the 2019 MLB draft. He made his MLB debut in 2022. In 2023, Carroll was an MLB All-Star and was named the National League Rookie of the Year en route to winning Arizona's first National League pennant since 2001. Carroll was again named an All-Star in 2025 and 2026. In 2026 Carroll won his first Gold Glove Award in right field. He is the active leader in triples with 60 and became the first Major League player to lead the entire league in triples for three consecutive seasons as well as four consecutive for the National League.

== Early life ==
Corbin Franklin Carroll was born on August 21, 2000, in Seattle, Washington, to Brant and Pey-Lin Carroll. his father is Irish-American, and his mother was born in Taiwan and moved to Louisiana with her parents at the age of four. Carroll has a younger sister who went to Holy Names Academy and became a soccer player. Carroll participated in cross-country sports to improve his speed.

== Amateur career ==
Carroll played on the USA U-18 National Team that won Gold in the 2018 COPABE Pan-American Championships. He attended Lakeside School in Seattle. As a senior in 2019, he hit .540 with nine home runs and a 1.859 OPS. He committed to play college baseball at UCLA.

== Professional career ==
=== Draft and minor leagues ===
The Arizona Diamondbacks selected Carroll with the 16th overall pick in the first round of the 2019 Major League Baseball draft. He signed for $3.7 million and was assigned to the Arizona League Diamondbacks to make his professional debut. After batting .291 with two home runs, 14 RBIs, and 16 stolen bases over 31 games, he was promoted to the Hillsboro Hops on August 8. Over 11 games with Hillsboro, he batted .326 with six RBIs. Between the two teams, he batted .299/.409/.487 in 154 at bats, with 18 stolen bases in 19 attempts.

Carroll did not play a minor league game in 2020 due to the cancellation of the minor league season caused by the COVID-19 pandemic. He returned to Hillsboro to begin the 2021 season. However, in early May, Carroll injured his shoulder while hitting a home run and later underwent season-ending shoulder surgery. At the time, he was 10-for-23 (.435) for the season.

Carroll opened the 2022 season with the Amarillo Sod Poodles of the Texas League. In early July, he was promoted to the Reno Aces of the Pacific Coast League. With three minor league teams in 2022 he batted .307/.425/.611 in 362 at bats with 24 home runs and 31 steals in 36 attempts.

=== Arizona Diamondbacks (2022–present) ===
==== 2022 ====
The Diamondbacks promoted Carroll to the major leagues on August 29, 2022. He made his debut later that day, against the Philadelphia Phillies. He went 1–for-5 with a two-RBI double. On September 7, Carroll hit his first career home run, a solo shot off of San Diego Padres starter Yu Darvish. In 2022 with Arizona, he batted .260/.330/.500 in 104 at bats, playing primarily left field, and was the seventh-youngest ballplayer in the National League. He had the fastest sprint speed of any major league player, at 30.7 feet/second.

==== 2023 ====
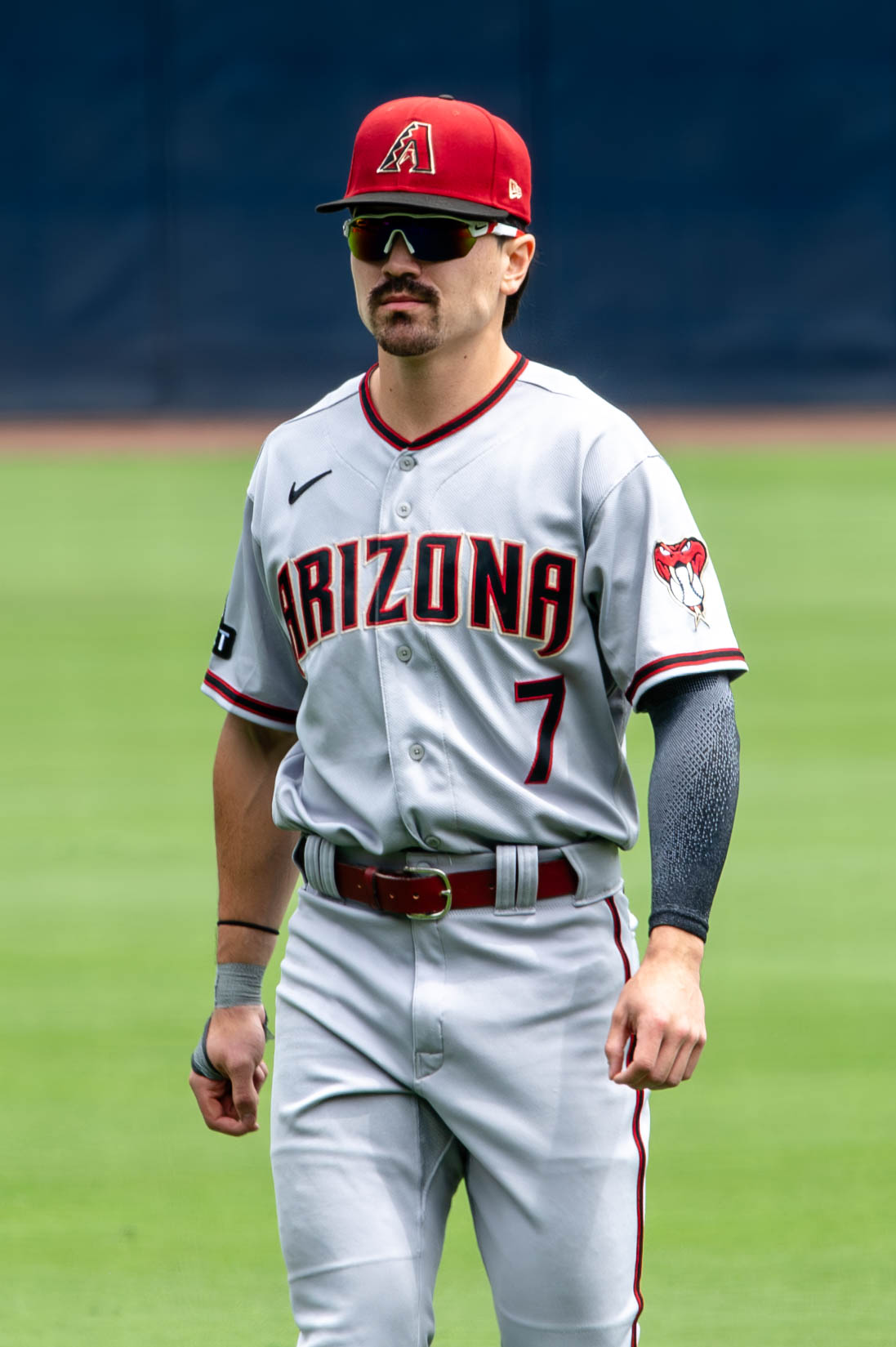
Carroll in 2023

On March 11, 2023, Carroll signed a contract extension worth $111 million over eight years with the Diamondbacks, after having played in only 32 major league games. Carroll immediately made an impact for the Diamondbacks to begin the 2023 season, hitting .309 with a .910 OPS and 10 stolen bases in the month of April. On June 1 against the Colorado Rockies, Carroll hit a two-out, two-run single in the ninth inning, marking the first walk-off hit of his career. Carroll hit his first career grand slam on June 9 against the Detroit Tigers, and later won the National League Rookie of the Month for June, hitting .291 with eight homers, 22 RBIs, and eight steals. On June 29, it was announced Carroll would be a starting outfielder in the 2023 All-Star Game in his hometown of Seattle, marking his first career All-Star appearance.

In his first full season in the majors, Carroll slashed .285/.362/.506 with 30 doubles, 10 triples, 25 homers, 76 RBI, 57 walks, and 54 stolen bases in 155 games. He became the first rookie in major league history to join the 20–50 club, reaching 20+ home runs and 50+ stolen bases in the same season. He also became the first player ever to have 10+ triples, 25+ doubles, 25+ home runs, and 50+ stolen bases in a single season. Carroll won the Major League Baseball Rookie of the Year Award by a unanimous vote, becoming the first Diamondbacks player to win the award (the Diamondbacks were the only remaining franchise not to have a player win it at the time), and the first Asian-American to win it. He was also named to the All-MLB First Team as an outfielder and finished fifth in NL MVP voting.

Carroll helped the Diamondbacks advance to the 2023 postseason, where they faced the Milwaukee Brewers in the Wild Card Series. Down 3–0 early in game 1, Carroll hit a 444-foot, two-run home run to spark six unanswered Diamondback runs as they won 6–3. Carroll and the Diamondbacks closed out the Brewers in game 2 and swept the Los Angeles Dodgers in the Division Series, with Carroll boasting a slash line of .412/.565/.824 across the five games. In the NLCS against the Philadelphia Phillies, Carroll struggled with a .222 average and a .489 OPS, but he turned it around in game 7, going 3-for-4 with two RBIs and two stolen bases, becoming the second-youngest player in MLB history (behind Ty Cobb in the 1908 World Series) to achieve at least three hits and two steals in a playoff game. Carroll reached the 2023 World Series in his first full season with the Diamondbacks, where they lost in five games to the Texas Rangers, with Carroll driving in four runs in the series.

==== 2024 ====
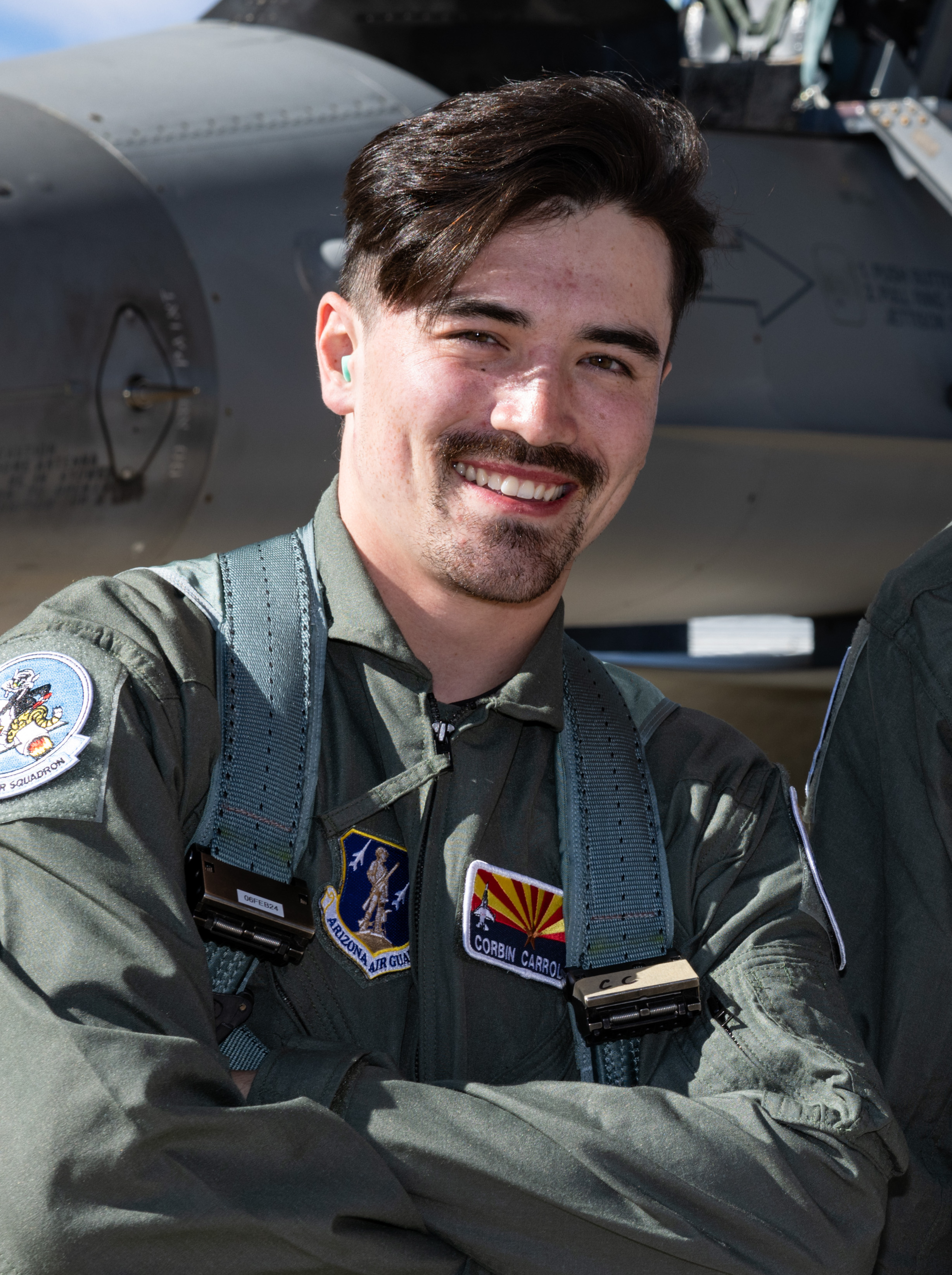
Carroll in 2024

In the first half of the 2024 season, Carroll's performance declined significantly. Prior to the All-Star Game, Carroll had a dismal batting average of .212 with only five home runs, 32 RBIs, and 18 stolen bases through 94 games. This was a sharp dropoff compared to the first half of his rookie season, in which Carroll batted .289 with 18 home runs, 48 RBIs, and 26 stolen bases before the All-Star Game. Carroll achieved his first-half rookie numbers in 86 games, eight games fewer than in 2024, further highlighting his sophomore slump.

In the second half of the 2024 season, Carroll turned his power numbers around by focusing on making better contact and driving the ball in the air. Following a .334 slugging percentage and five home runs at the All-Star break, Carroll slugged .660 with 14 homers in the first 40 games following the All-Star break, including a surge in power against high-velocity fastballs. On July 29 against the Washington Nationals, Carroll hit a pinch-hit, two-run home run to cap off a five-run ninth-inning rally as the Diamondbacks won 9–8. The home run marked Carroll's first career walk-off home run.

On August 16, Carroll hit a two-out, two-run home run off closer Pete Fairbanks of the Tampa Bay Rays in the ninth to tie the game, but the Diamondbacks ultimately lost in extra innings. On August 28, he hit two home runs against the New York Mets, including a two-out go-ahead grand slam in the eighth inning against closer Edwin Diaz to lead the Diamondbacks to an 8–5 victory. Carroll was later named the NL Player of the Month for August, slashing .280/.342/.700 with 11 homers, 24 RBI, and 30 runs scored in the month. In his second full season in the majors, Carroll slashed .231/.424/.740 with 22 doubles, 14 triples, 22 homers, 74 RBI, 73 walks, and 35 stolen bases in 158 games.

==== 2025 ====
On June 13, 2025, Carroll hit his 20th homer of the year as part of a three-run rally in the fifth inning, which led to Arizona's 5-1 victory over the San Diego Padres. It's the third straight season Carroll has reached the 20-homer mark. On September 21, Carroll stole his 30th stolen base to become the 50th member of the 30-30 club, and the first in Diamondback history. Due to reaching that milestone, Carroll became the second player in MLB history to record 30+ HR, 30+ SB, 30+ 2B, and 15+ 3B in a season, joining Jimmy Rollins (2007).

Carroll ended the 2025 season with a slash line of .259/.343/.491 with 31 home runs in 143 games and a career-high Wins Above Replacement (WAR) of 5.8 on Baseball Reference, and 6.5 on Fangraphs. Fangraphs ranked him as tied for fourth among all National League players in 2025.

==== 2026 ====
On February 11, 2026, it was announced that Carroll would require surgery to repair a broken hamate bone suffered in batting practice. On May 24, Carroll hit his 50th career triple, in a game where he went 4-for-4 against the Colorado Rockies. On June 26, Carroll hit his 10th triple of the season, the 53rd of his career, breaking Stephen Drew's Arizona Diamondbacks franchise record of 52 career triples. On August 12, 2026, Carroll hit his 100th career home run off Colorado Rockies pitcher Brennan Bernardino, passing Willie Mays to became the fastest player in MLB history with more than 100 career homeruns, 100 steals and 50 triples in 606 career games.

==== 2027 ====
In November 2026, Carroll underwent surgery to clear loose bodies from his right elbow.

== Awards and honors ==
MLB

- 3× All-Star (2023, 2025, 2026)
- National League Rookie of the Year (2023)
- 2× All-MLB Team selection:
  - All-MLB First Team (2023)
  - All-MLB Second Team (2025)
- 3× MLB Triples Leader (2024–2026):
  - 4× National League Triples Leader (2023–2026)
- Silver Slugger Award (2025)
- Gold Glove Award (2026)
- National League Player of the Month (August 2024)
- National League Rookie of the Month (June 2023)
- 3× National League Player of the Week (June, 11 2023; September, 1 2024; August, 16 2026)
- Players Choice Award for National League Outstanding Rookie (2023)

MiLB

- USA Today Minor League Player of the Year Award (2022)
- All-Star Futures Game selection (2022)
- Baseball America Triple-A All-Star selection (2022)
- Baseball America Double-A All-Star selection (2022)
- Texas League Postseason All-Star selection (2023)

International

- COPABE U-18 Pan-American Championships Gold Medalist (2018)

High school

- Under Armour All-America Baseball Game selection (2018)
- Perfect Game All-American Classic selection (2018)
- Washington Gatorade Player of the Year (2018–19)
- The Seattle Times Baseball Player of the Year (2019)
- Washington State Baseball Coaches Association Player of the Year (2019)
- 2× MaxPreps High School Baseball All-American First Team (2018, 2019)
- MaxPreps Underclass All-American Baseball Junior Team (2019)
- Perfect Game All-American Classic MVP (2018)

=== MLB statistical achievements ===
MLB statistical leader
Category	Times	Seasons
Triples leader	3	2024, 2025, 2026
Notes: Per Baseball-Reference.com. Through the 2026 season.

National League statistical leader
Category	Times	Seasons
Triples leader	4	2023, 2024, 2025, 2026
Notes: Per Baseball-Reference.com. Through the 2026 season.

- 20–50 club – September 20, 2023, San Francisco Giants
- 30–30 club – September 21, 2025, Philadelphia Phillies

== International career ==
Carroll was invited to join the Taiwanese national baseball team for the 2026 World Baseball Classic. He declined, informing Chinese Professional Baseball League commissioner Tsai Chi-chang that he would seek a roster spot on the United States national baseball team. Ultimately, Carroll did not end up playing for Team USA in the World Baseball Classic due to a broken hamate bone in his right hand.

== See also ==
- All-Star Futures Game all-time roster
- Arizona Diamondbacks award winners and league leaders
- List of Arizona Diamondbacks team records
- List of Major League Baseball annual triples leaders
- 30–30 club

Awards and achievements
Preceded by Brenton Doyle	National League Player of the Month; August 2024	Succeeded by Shohei Ohtani
