= José Valverde =

Dominican baseball player (born 1978)

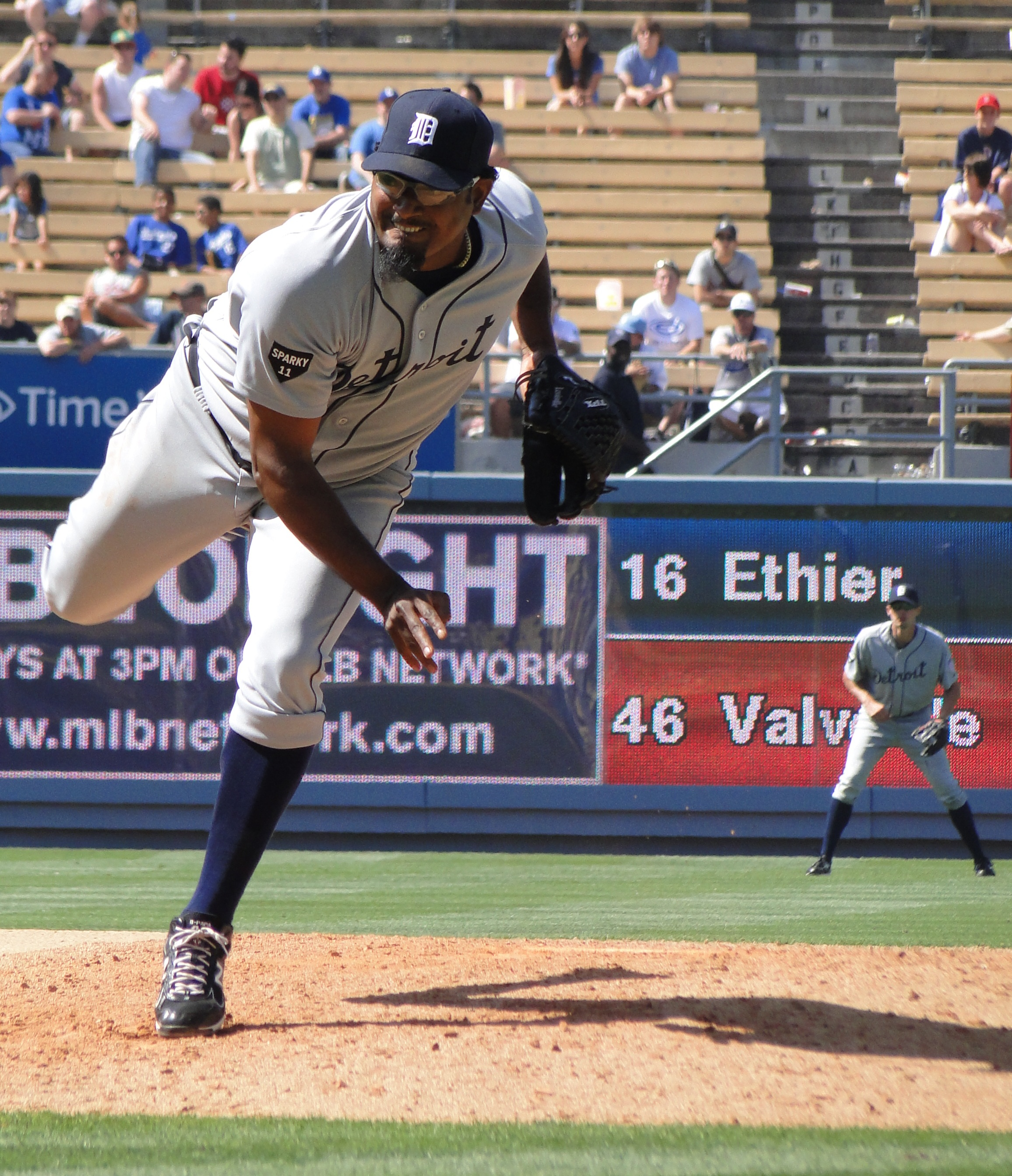
- Valverde pitching for the Detroit Tigers in 2011
- Pitcher
- Born: March 24, 1978 (age 48); San Pedro de Macorís, Dominican Republic
- Batted: Right Threw: Right

MLB debut
- June 1, 2003, for the Arizona Diamondbacks

Last MLB appearance
- May 26, 2014, for the New York Mets

MLB statistics
- Win–loss record: 27–33
- Earned run average: 3.27
- Strikeouts: 692
- Saves: 288
- Stats at Baseball Reference

Teams
- Arizona Diamondbacks (2003–2007); Houston Astros (2008–2009); Detroit Tigers (2010–2013); New York Mets (2014)

Career highlights and awards
- 3× All-Star (2007, 2010, 2011); 2× Rolaids Relief Man Award (2007, 2011); Delivery Man of the Year (2011); 3× Saves leader (2007, 2008, 2011)

José Rafael Valverde (born March 24, 1978) is a Dominican former professional baseball pitcher who played 12 seasons in Major League Baseball (MLB) for the Arizona Diamondbacks, Houston Astros, Detroit Tigers, and New York Mets. He is nicknamed "Papa Grande" (Spanish for "Big papa").

== Career ==
=== Arizona Diamondbacks ===
==== 2003 ====
Valverde made his Major League Baseball debut in 2003 to help out when Arizona Diamondbacks closer Matt Mantei was injured. He was named the National League Player of the Week on June 23, 2003. For the season, he finished with 10 saves in 54 appearances. His ERA finished at 2.15 with 71 strikeouts in 50.1 innings pitched.

In September 2003 Valverde hit a double on the first pitch that he faced in the major leagues, thrown by Leo Estrella. He then scored on an RBI single from Steve Finley. In the rest of his career he would bat only once more, striking out in 2008.

==== 2004 ====
Injured for most of the 2004 season, Valverde only managed to appear in 29 games.

==== 2005 ====
He gained the Diamondbacks closer role after replacing Brian Bruney in 2005. He ended the season with a 2.44 ERA and 15 saves in 61 games.

==== 2006 ====
Valverde had some troubles in June 2006, and management sent him to the Diamondbacks' Triple-A affiliate, the Tucson Sidewinders. He returned to the closer role in early September and pitched well in his return. Valverde finished the 2006 season with a record of two wins, three losses, an ERA of 5.84 and 18 saves.

==== 2007 ====
On June 23, 2007, Valverde passed Matt Mantei as the Diamondbacks all-time saves leader, with his 75th, a perfect ninth against the Baltimore Orioles. Valverde made the 2007 MLB All-Star Game as a closer for Arizona. Until he was traded during the 2007 offseason, Valverde was the Diamondbacks closer, and led all of Major League Baseball in saves (47) during the 2007 regular season.

On September 25, 2007, Valverde was named as one of 10 finalists for the Delivery Man of the Year Award.

=== Houston Astros ===
On December 14, 2007, Valverde was traded to the Houston Astros for pitchers Chad Qualls, Juan Gutiérrez and IF/OF Chris Burke.

==== 2008 ====
He finished his first year in Houston with 44 saves in 51 chances, a 6–4 record, 83 strikeouts, and an ERA of 3.38. He led the NL in saves for the second straight year and was second in the majors in saves for 2008. When Valverde entered into the game, his walk up song was "Ladies and Gentlemen", by the band Saliva.

==== 2009 ====
In 2009, Valverde saved just 25 games as he was hampered by an injury throughout the season. Following the 2009 season, Valverde filed for free agency, rejecting the Astros' offer of salary arbitration.

=== Detroit Tigers ===
==== 2010 ====
On January 19, 2010, Valverde signed a two-year, $14 million contract, with a third year team option for $9 million with the Detroit Tigers. Through the first half of the season he had an ERA of 0.94 and had scoreless streak of 24 innings, which is longest in Tigers history passing Todd Jones who previously held the record at 22 innings in 2000.

Valverde represented the Tigers at the 2010 All-Star Game along with Justin Verlander and Miguel Cabrera. Following the All-Star break, he suffered some nagging injuries, finishing the year with 26 saves and a 3.00 ERA.

==== 2011 ====
On May 8, 2011, Valverde recorded his 200th career save. Valverde was elected to his third All-Star Game, and American League manager Ron Washington selected Valverde to serve as the team's closer.

On September 11, 2011, Valverde recorded his 43rd save of the season, passing Todd Jones as the Tigers' single-season saves leader. His 45th save of the season on September 16 secured the AL Central Division title for the Tigers. On the final day of the regular season he recorded his 49th straight save, completing his perfect regular season. It was his 51st consecutive save opportunity converted since 2010. He won the 2011 Delivery Man of the Year Award and the American League Rolaids Relief Man Award as the most outstanding relief pitcher of the regular season. In 2011, he led AL pitchers in saves, games (75), and games finished (70). Through 2011, he was sixth among all active pitchers in career saves (242).

He recorded two saves in the 2011 ALDS, the second of which sent the Tigers to the 2011 ALCS. He recorded one save in the Tigers' two ALCS wins.

Valverde finished fifth in the 2011 AL Cy Young Award voting, which was won by teammate Justin Verlander.

==== 2012 ====
On October 28, 2011, the Tigers picked up the 2012 club option on Valverde's contract. On opening day, his consecutive save streak ended after blowing a 2–0 lead versus the Boston Red Sox, although he earned the win after the Tigers won, 3–2.

Valverde finished the 2012 season with 35 saves and a 3.78 ERA, his highest since the 2006 season. His strikeouts per 9 innings pitched rate was a career-low 6.3.

On October 10, 2012, Valverde blew a save against the Oakland Athletics in Game 4 of the 2012 ALDS. The Tigers held a 3–1 lead entering the bottom of the ninth when Valverde entered the game. He gave up three consecutive hits before recording an out in a game the A's eventually won, 4–3.

On October 13, 2012, Valverde blew a 4–0 lead against the New York Yankees in the bottom of the ninth in Game 1 of the 2012 ALCS by allowing a pair of two-run home runs, one by Ichiro Suzuki and the other by Raúl Ibañez. Although the Tigers won 6–4 in twelve innings, Phil Coke replaced Valverde as the Tigers' closer for the remainder of the postseason.

On October 30, 2012, Valverde became a free agent.

==== 2013 ====
On April 4, 2013, The Tigers signed Valverde to a minor league contract. He pitched in 3 games in Class-A for the Lakeland Flying Tigers. On April 23, the Tigers called him up to the Majors, which necessitated signing him to a new Major League contract. He recorded a save in his first game back with the Tigers on April 24.

On May 31, 2013, Valverde gave up a walk-off home run from Baltimore Orioles player Chris Dickerson. This gave him his first loss of the season.

Valverde played his last game with the Tigers on June 19, 2013, giving up 4 earned runs in 10 pitches against the Baltimore Orioles.

Valverde was designated for assignment on June 21, 2013. After clearing waivers, Valverde was outrighted from the 40-man roster and accepted the assignment to the Triple-A Toledo Mud Hens. Valverde was released on August 7, 2013.

After saving 75 games in his first 78 save opportunities with the Tigers, Valverde was 44 for 52 over his last two seasons with the team. Despite fans souring on him in late 2012 and into 2013, he left the Tigers having established the best save conversion percentage (119-for-130, 91.5%) of any closer in team history.

=== New York Mets ===
==== 2014 ====
On February 12, 2014, Valverde signed a minor league deal with an invite to Spring training with the New York Mets. He was added to the Mets 40-man roster on March 26. On May 26, Valverde allowed 4 earned runs, blowing a 2–1 lead over the Pittsburgh Pirates and earning his first loss of the season. Immediately after the game ended, Valverde was released by the Mets.

=== Washington Nationals ===
On January 10, 2015, Valverde signed a minor league contract with the San Diego Padres, and was released on April 2.

On April 29, 2015, Valverde signed a minor league contract with the Washington Nationals. On July 22, Valverde was released by the Nationals organization. He recorded 10 saves with the Syracuse Chiefs, the Triple-A affiliate of the Nationals. On August 14, Valverde was suspended 80 games for a violation of the MLB drug policy, having tested positive for stanozolol.

=== Rieleros de Aguascalientes ===
On April 10, 2017, Valverde signed with the Rieleros de Aguascalientes of the Mexican League. He made 52 appearances for Aguascalientes, posting a 2–4 record and 2.81 ERA with 72 strikeouts and 25 saves across 57 2/3 innings pitched. Valverde was released by the Rieleros on February 9, 2018.

Valverde re-signed with the Rieleros on January 25, 2019, after spending 2018 out of the league due to injuries. In 40 appearances for Aguascalientes, he struggled to a 6.16 ERA and 2–2 record with 29 strikeouts over 38 innings of relief. Valverde was later released again by the team on July 11.

As his last MLB appearance was in 2014, Valverde was one of the players selected to appear on the 2020 Baseball Hall of Fame ballot. He did not receive any votes.

== Pitching style ==
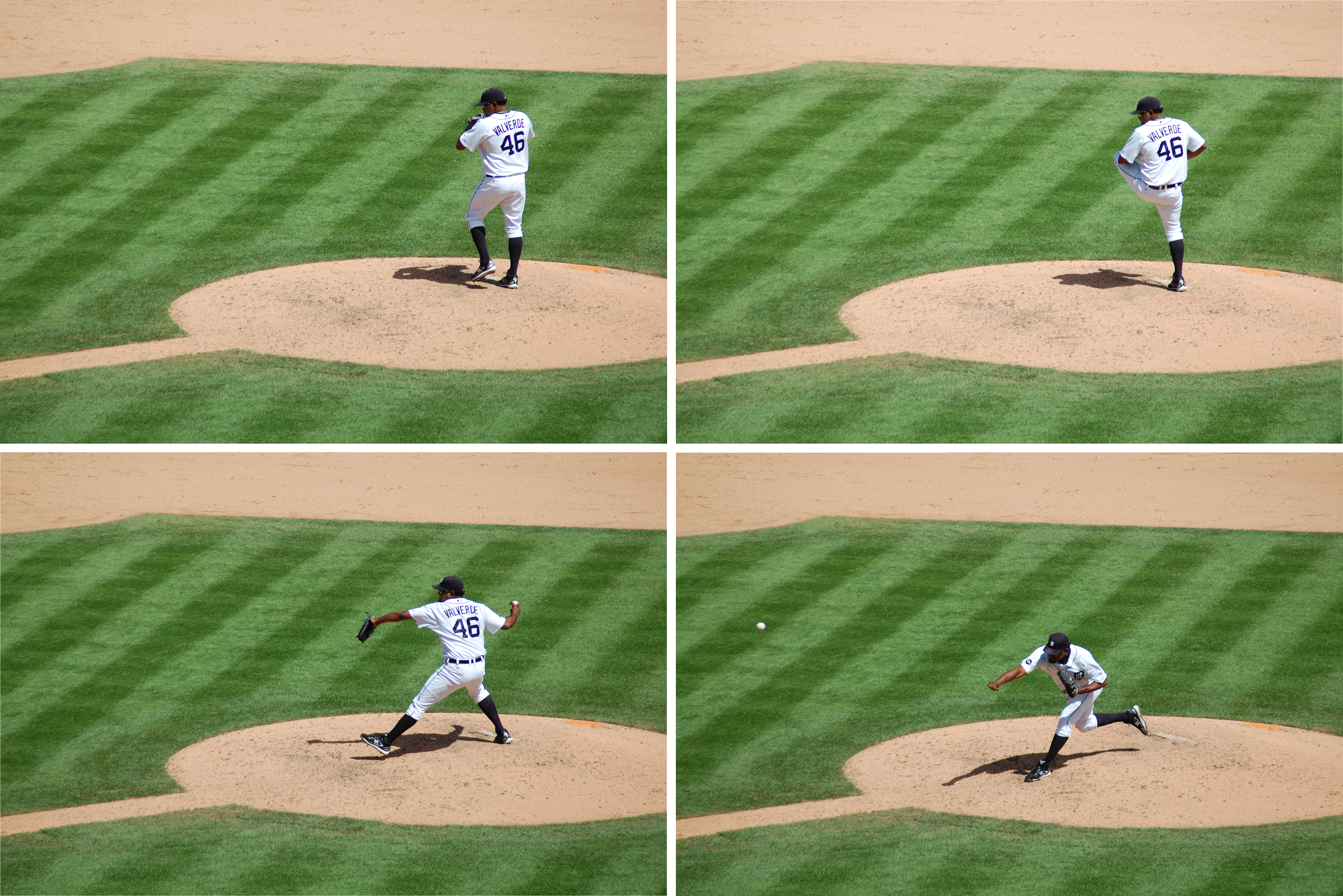
Valverde's pitching motion from 2010

Valverde throws just two pitches, a four-seam fastball (93–96 mph) and a forkball (84–87). He throws a slightly higher percentage of forkballs to left-handed hitters. He is comfortable using the pitch in almost all counts, although he throws it most often when it is 0–2 or 1–2. Valverde's control is sometimes spotty, as he has an above average career rate of 3.9 walks per nine innings. This balances a dominating 10.3 strikeouts per nine innings ratio.

Valverde is also known for his energetic, highly emotional style on the mound. He frequently celebrates outs and saves very demonstratively. Some have questioned the sportsmanship of his behavior, including former teammate Miguel Montero of the Arizona Diamondbacks who has called him "unprofessional".

== See also ==
- Arizona Diamondbacks award winners and league leaders
- Houston Astros award winners and league leaders
- List of Arizona Diamondbacks team records
- List of Houston Astros team records
- List of Major League Baseball career games finished leaders
- List of Major League Baseball career saves leaders
- List of Major League Baseball players from the Dominican Republic
