= MRI (disambiguation) =

MRI, or magnetic resonance imaging, is a medical imaging technique.

MRI or mri can also refer to:

== Science, medicine, and technology ==
- Magnetic Resonance Imaging (journal), a scientific journal
- Magnetorotational instability, in astrophysics
- Mean Recurrence Interval, of floods and other variable events
- Meuse-Rhine-Issel, a breed of cattle
- Monoamine reuptake inhibitor, a type of drug class, primarily for use as antidepressants
- Ruby MRI (Matz's Ruby Interpreter), the reference implementation of the Ruby programming language

== Places ==
- Manchester Royal Infirmary, a hospital in Manchester, England
- Manggarai railway station, Jakarta, Indonesia (station code)
- Maritime Rescue Institute, a former maritime training and rescue charity
- Mauritius, an IOC code
- Max Rubner Institute, a government health agency in Germany
- Member of the Royal Institution, Westminster, United Kingdom
- Mental Research Institute, a systemic and family therapy organization in Palo Alto, California, United States
- Merrill Field, Alaska, United States, an IATA code
- Microwave Research Institute, now called Weber Research Institute, a research group at the Polytechnic Institute of New York University
- Midwest Research Institute, a Kansas City-based non-profit research institute since 1944, Missouri, United States

== Organizations ==
- Magnum Research, Inc., an American firearm manufacturer

== Other uses ==
- Mri (fictional alien species), in the Faded Sun Trilogy
- Māori language, an ISO 639-3 code
