= Dustin Pedroia =

American baseball player (born 1983)

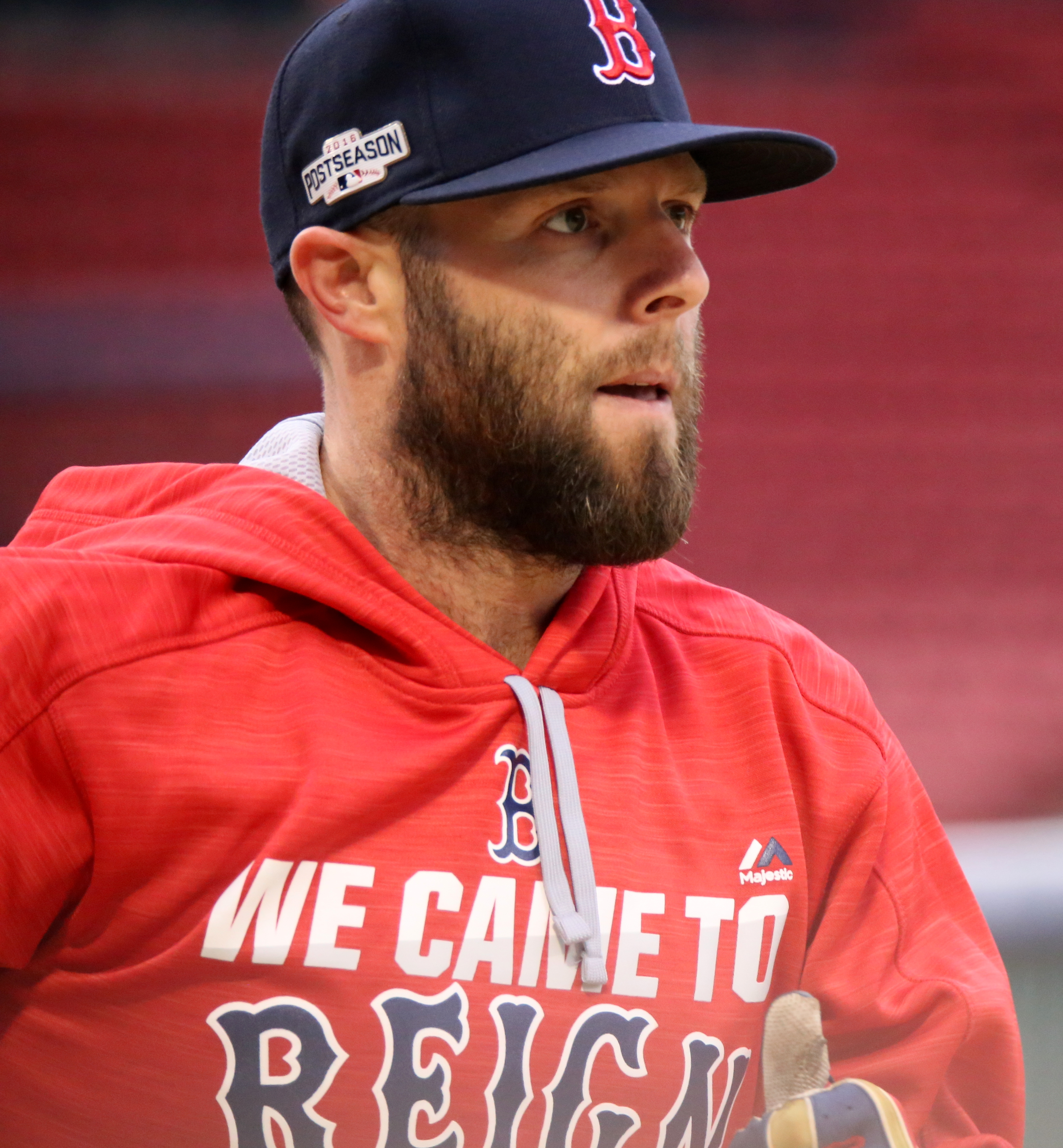
- Pedroia with the Boston Red Sox in 2016
- Second baseman
- Born: August 17, 1983 (age 43); Woodland, California, U.S.
- Batted: Right Threw: Right

MLB debut
- August 22, 2006, for the Boston Red Sox

Last MLB appearance
- April 17, 2019, for the Boston Red Sox

MLB statistics
- Batting average: .299
- Home runs: 140
- Runs batted in: 725
- Stats at Baseball Reference

Teams
- Boston Red Sox (2006–2019)

Career highlights and awards
- 4× All-Star (2008–2010, 2013); 2× World Series champion (2007, 2013); AL MVP (2008); AL Rookie of the Year (2007); 4× Gold Glove Award (2008, 2011, 2013, 2014); Silver Slugger Award (2008); Boston Red Sox Hall of Fame
Medals
Men's baseball
Representing United States
Pan American Games
Silver medal – second place	2003 Santo Domingo	Team

Dustin Luis Pedroia (born August 17, 1983) is an American former professional baseball second baseman who played his entire Major League Baseball (MLB) career for the Boston Red Sox, from 2006 to 2019. He was a four-time All-Star, and won the American League (AL) Rookie of the Year Award in 2007 and the AL Most Valuable Player and Silver Slugger Award in 2008. He has also received four Gold Glove Awards and was named AL Defensive Player of the Year in 2013.

Pedroia was selected by the Red Sox in the 2004 MLB draft and made his major league debut in 2006. He became a full-time player for Boston in 2007, winning the AL Rookie of the Year Award. He was a member of the Red Sox World Series championship teams in 2007 and 2013. Pedroia was the last player from the 2007 World Series team to leave the club. A knee injury late in the 2017 season marked the end of his effective play. After playing in only nine major league games over the 2018 and 2019 seasons, including missing the 2018 postseason, he also missed all of the shortened 2020 season. He announced his retirement on February 1, 2021.

Pedroia was a proficient contact hitter with a very low strikeout rate and "a surprising amount of power," whose defense at second base has been rated significantly above-average. Pedroia was the first Red Sox infielder to win four Gold Gloves.

== Early life ==
Born and raised in Woodland, California, northwest of Sacramento, Pedroia's parents operated a tire shop where they worked 14-hour days. His mother, Debbie Pedroia, played tennis at Sacramento City College. Pedroia's older brother, Brett, played baseball as a catcher at Shasta College.

Pedroia attended Woodland High School and played football and baseball. His football career ended as a freshman quarterback; a hit from future All-Pro NFL linebacker Lance Briggs shattered his ankle. As a senior baseball player, Pedroia did not strike out all season, compiled a .445 batting average and was chosen as his league's most valuable player.

== College career ==
Pedroia attended Arizona State University (ASU), where he played college baseball for the Arizona State Sun Devils baseball team. He was teammates with Ian Kinsler and Andre Ethier. Kinsler and Pedroia competed for the shortstop position at ASU. Ultimately, Pedroia stayed at shortstop, while Kinsler ended up at second base before transferring to the University of Missouri. In three years at ASU, Pedroia never hit below .347 and had a career average of .384, starting all 185 games. To help ASU recruit better pitchers, Pedroia also relinquished the last two years of his athletic scholarship. He was named ASU On Deck Circle Most Valuable Player; other winners have included Ike Davis, Willie Bloomquist, Paul Lo Duca, and Barry Bonds.

== Professional career ==
=== Draft and minor leagues ===
Pedroia was drafted by the Red Sox in the second round of the 2004 MLB draft, with the 65th pick overall. Pedroia, the eighth shortstop drafted, received a $575,000 signing bonus.

During three seasons in Minor League Baseball, Pedroia batted .308 while playing second base and shortstop. He spent 2004 with the Class A Augusta GreenJackets and Class A-Advanced Sarasota Red Sox, part of 2005 with the Double-A Portland Sea Dogs, and parts of 2005 and 2006 with the Triple-A Pawtucket Red Sox.

=== Boston Red Sox ===
==== 2006–2007 ====
After a brief call-up in 2006, when he hit just .191 in 89 at-bats, Pedroia became the regular second baseman for the Red Sox in 2007 replacing Mark Loretta. Pedroia suffered through an early-season hitting slump, but recovered, later putting up a 13-game hitting streak and a five-hit game against the Giants. He notably made a diving stop to preserve fellow rookie Clay Buchholz's no-hitter on September 1. Pedroia won the AL Rookie of the Year award and was selected to the 2007 Topps Major League Rookie All-Star Team.

The Red Sox played the Indians in the 2007 ALCS. In Game 7 of the series, Pedroia homered and doubled, collecting five RBI to secure the Red Sox' spot in the World Series, to face the Rockies. Pedroia homered in the first at bat of the series, making him only the second player, and the first rookie, to lead off the Series with a home run. The Red Sox went on to win their second World Series title in four seasons – and the first World Series championship for Pedroia.

==== 2008: MVP season ====
Pedroia performed very well during the 2008 regular season, and received AL MVP, Gold Glove and Silver Slugger awards. He was the first-ever Red Sox second baseman to win a Silver Slugger Award, the first Red Sox second baseman to win a Gold Glove since Doug Griffin in 1972, and the first second baseman to win an American League MVP Award since Nellie Fox in 1959. He hit .326 with 17 home runs over 726 PAs, for a 127 wRC+. Pedroia was defensively great, making only six errors through 157 games, saving +9.7 runs over the season, according to UZR. 2008 was also Pedroia's most productive season on the basepaths; he stole 20 bases in 21 attempts, for baserunning worth 4.9 runs above average.

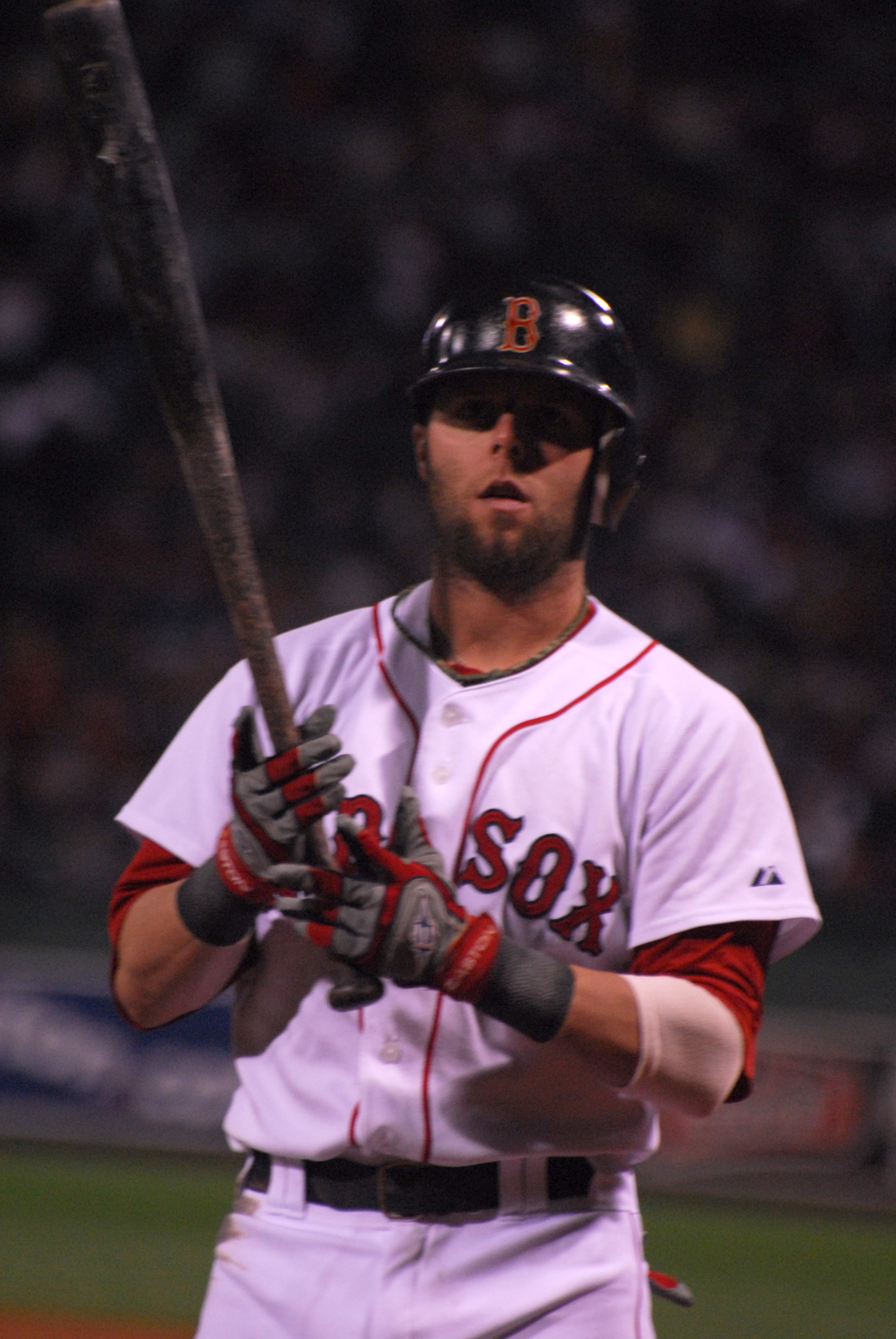
Pedroia on deck in 2008 against the Cleveland Indians

Pedroia's contribution in the regular season was rated 6.5 WAR by Fangraphs, a "superstar" level of performance. He became only the third player in MLB history to win Rookie of the Year and Most Valuable Player in consecutive seasons joining Cal Ripken Jr. and Ryan Howard, and later was followed by Kris Bryant.

Pedroia was hitless through the first three games of the 2008 ALDS, recording only an RBI double in Game 4. The Red Sox defeated the Angels in four games. In the ALCS against the Tampa Bay Rays, Pedroia collected nine hits in 26 plate appearances, including three home runs and a double. The rest of the team struggled to a .234 batting average against the Tampa pitching staff, and the Red Sox lost the series.

==== 2009 ====
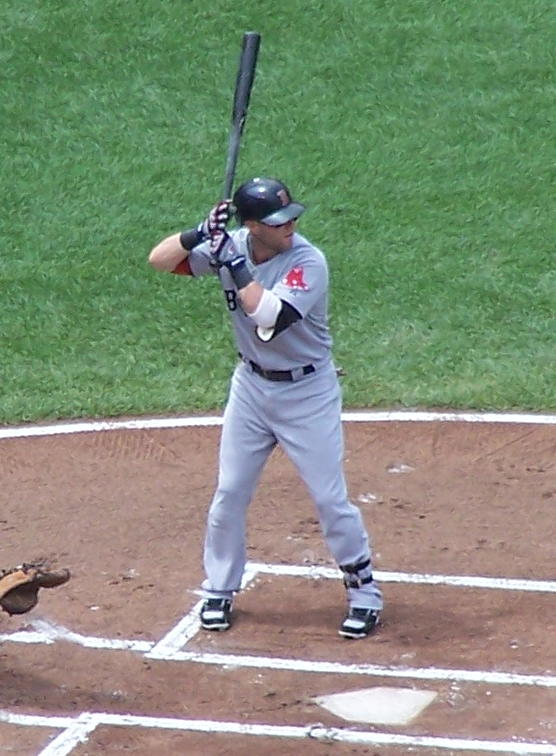
Pedroia bats against Baltimore in August 2009.

On December 3, 2008, Pedroia signed a six-year contract extension worth $40.5 million, with an additional team option for 2015 worth $11 million.

Pedroia announced on December 15, 2008, that he would play for the United States team in the 2009 World Baseball Classic. He recorded the first Major League hit in Citi Field history during an April 3 exhibition game against the Mets. He hit a home run in his first at bat of the 2009 season.

Pedroia was selected to start for the 2009 AL All Star Team. However, Pedroia had to withdraw from the team to stay with his wife Kelli, who was experiencing pregnancy complications with the couple's first child. The same issue had caused him to miss a regular season game prior to the All Star break.

Pedroia achieved his first multi-home run game on September 8, 2009, against the Orioles.

==== 2010 ====
In 2010, MLB umpire Joe West made controversial statements regarding the speed of play between the Red Sox and Yankees. Pedroia responded by saying, "What he doesn't understand is that when we don't do well in these games against the Yankees, we get killed. If he doesn't want to do Red Sox and Yankee games, he should tell the umpires' union. Then when we're in the World Series, he'll be out of that assignment, too."

On June 24, 2010, Pedroia went 5 for 5, with 5 RBI, and hit three home runs in a game against the Rockies that the Red Sox won, 13–11, in the tenth inning. The next day, Pedroia fouled a ball off his foot in an at-bat versus the Giants. MRI results the next day confirmed that he had a broken bone in his foot, and he was placed on the 15-day disabled list. Pedroia was under doctor's orders not to put weight on his injured foot for two weeks, but continued to practice fielding grounders while on his knees.

Pedroia was named to be a reserve player on the 2010 AL All Star team, but did not participate due to this injury, and had former Arizona State teammate Ian Kinsler replace him on the roster. Pedroia returned to the lineup on August 17 against the Angels, only to be put back on the DL after playing 2 games. Pedroia would end the 2010 season having played only 75 games.

==== 2011 ====
In 2011, Pedroia bounced back, batting .307 and slugging 21 home runs over 159 games. He won a Fielding Bible Award in 2011 as the best fielding second baseman in MLB, and had his best defensive season by ultimate zone rating, with 18.1 runs saved. In June and July, Pedroia had a 25-game hitting streak, the longest for a Red Sox second baseman. On August 16, Pedroia was involved in throwing a triple play, started by Jed Lowrie. Pedroia's 2011 season was rated at 7.6 Wins Above Replacement by Fangraphs, an "MVP-caliber" performance.

==== 2012 ====
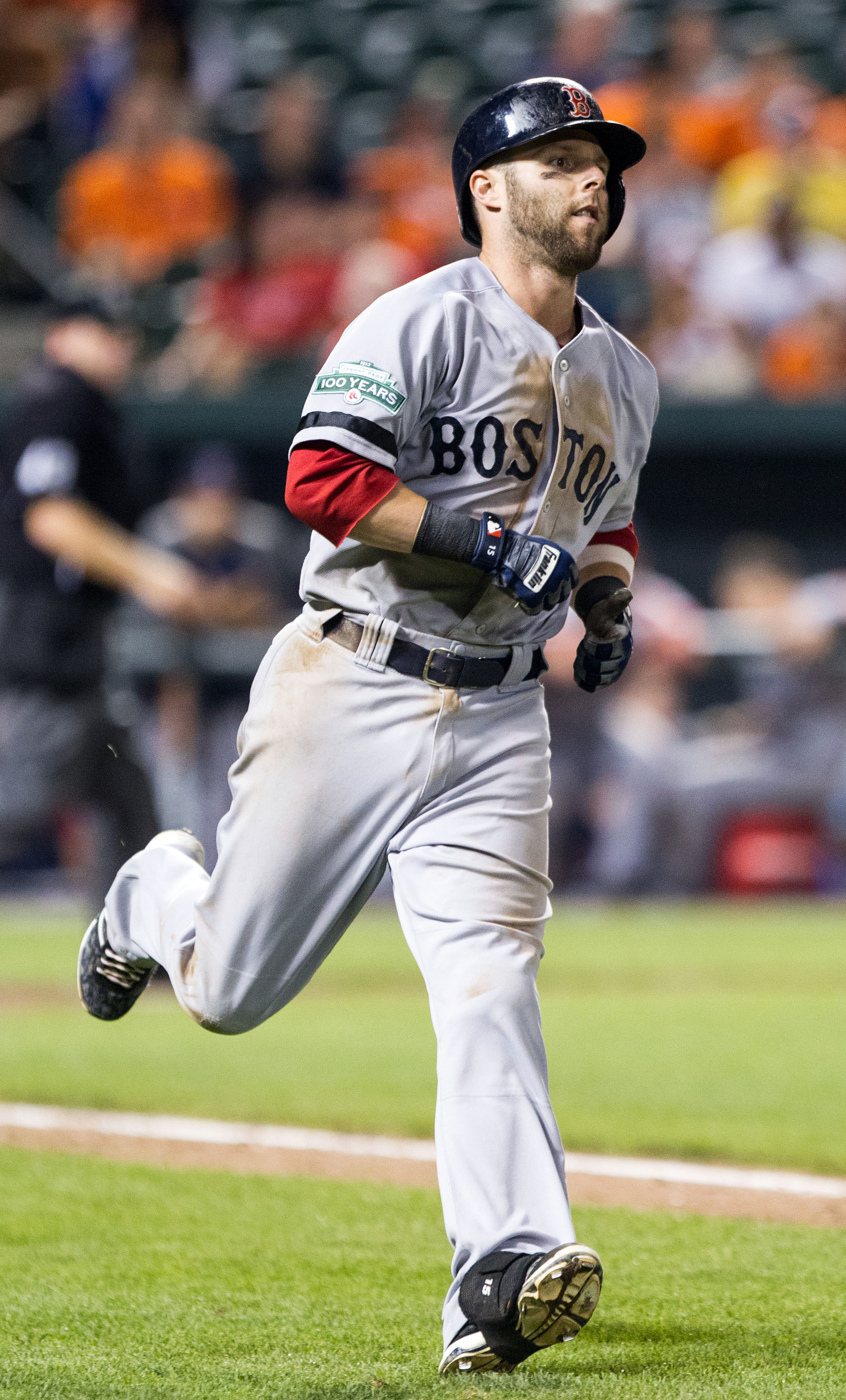
Pedroia with the Red Sox in 2012

On September 30, 2012, Pedroia broke his left ring finger but, after being reassured the injury would not degrade with use, he made the decision to play through the pain in the following season-ending series at Yankee Stadium.

==== 2013 ====
Pedroia batting against the Toronto Blue Jays

On July 23, 2013, Pedroia and the Red Sox agreed to an eight-year extension worth $110 million. Pedroia was represented in negotiations by Sam Levinson and Seth Levinson of ACES Inc.

Pedroia bounced back from his injury-affected 2012 season to become the only player on the Red Sox to play more than 150 games during the team's 2013 regular season, playing in 160 games. Pedroia posted a strong regular season performance, and was awarded his third Gold Glove, second Fielding Bible Award, and the Wilson Overall Defensive Player of the Year Award for the American League. The Red Sox won their division and went on to win the World Series.

In November 2013, Pedroia underwent thumb surgery to repair a torn UCL, an injury he suffered when sliding to first base on opening day.

==== 2014 ====
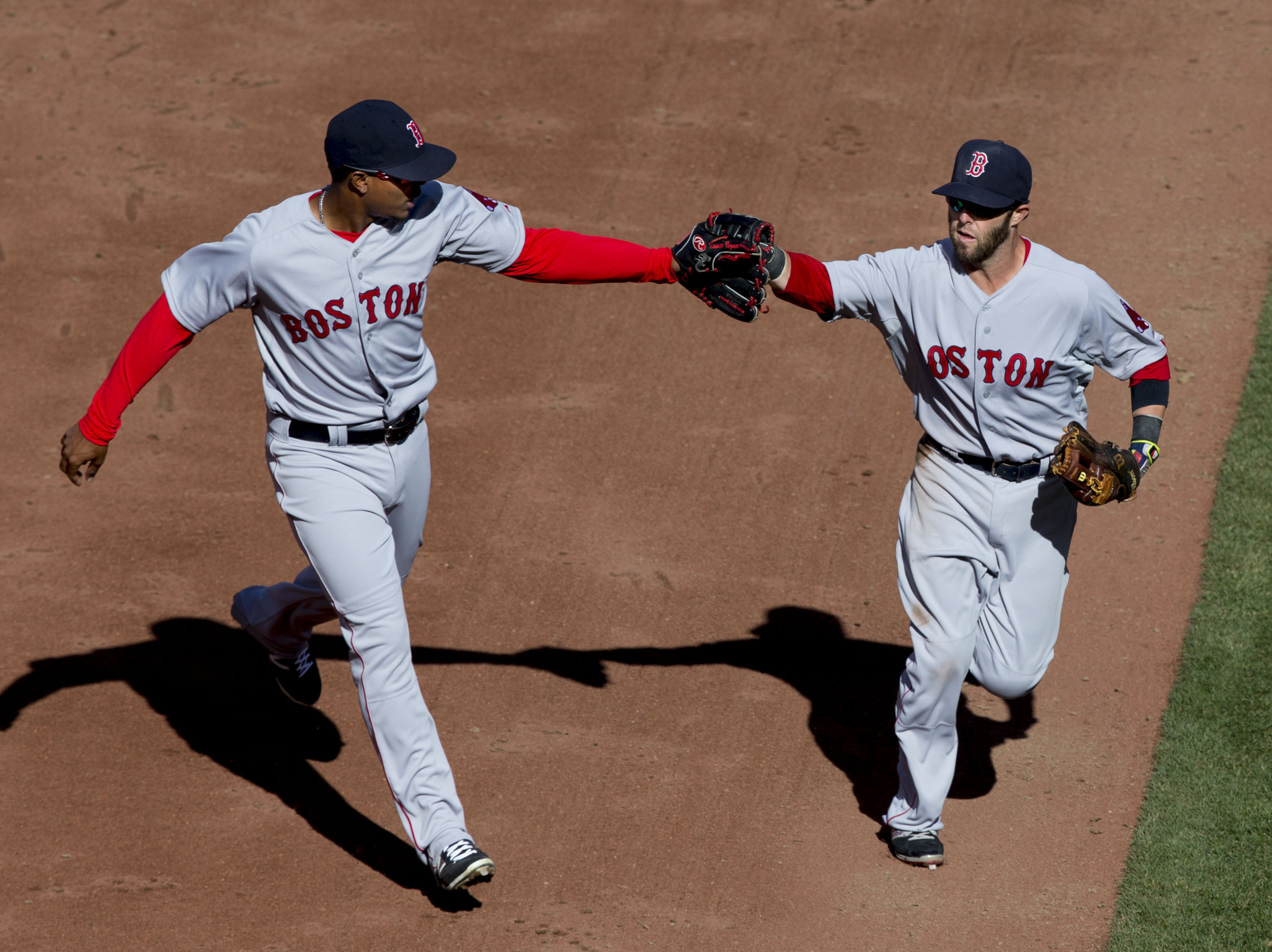
Pedroia with Xander Bogaerts in 2014

In May 2014, Pedroia hit his 100th career home run and his 300th career double. Pedroia hit only four home runs before the 2014 All Star break, and his hitting productivity dropped to league average. For the season he batted .278/.337/.376. However, his fielding numbers remained strong. For his defensive performance, Pedroia was honored with the American League Gold Glove award at second base—his fourth in his nine-year career—along with his third Fielding Bible Award. This made him the first Red Sox infielder to win four Gold Gloves.

==== 2015 ====
Pedroia began the 2015 MLB season with two home runs in the Red Sox opening game, on the road at Citizens Bank Park, Philadelphia. On June 25, 2015, the Red Sox placed him on the 15-day disabled list due to a right hamstring strain.

==== 2016 ====
Pedroia had a strong month as a hitter in August, culminating in a streak of three games, from August 25 through 27, over which he hit safely in 11 consecutive at bats, falling one hit shy of tying the major league record of 12 consecutive at bats with a base hit (shared by three players since 1902). During the streak, Pedroia had 10 singles, one double, scored two runs and drove in three. He also walked once during the streak, thus reaching base safely over 12 consecutive plate appearances. In 154 games played, Pedroia batted .318 with 201 hits, 36 doubles, 105 runs scored, 15 home runs, and 74 RBI. He tied for second in the AL in double plays grounded into, with 24.

The Red Sox finished the 2016 season with a 93–69 record, clinching the AL East division, but were swept in three games by the Indians in the 2016 ALDS. On October 13, Pedroia underwent left knee surgery, a partial medial meniscectomy and chondroplasty. He won a 2016 Fielding Bible award. He also won the 2016 Wilson Defensive Player of the Year Award for second base, in all of MLB.

==== 2017 ====
On May 30, Pedroia was placed on the 10-day disabled list due to a left wrist sprain. On August 1, he was again placed on the 10-day disabled list due to left knee soreness, after being spiked in the knee by Orioles player Manny Machado. On August 12, Pedroia was placed on the disabled list for the third time of the season due to soreness in the same knee. Limited to 105 games, Pedroia finished the 2017 Red Sox season with a .293 batting average, 7 home runs, and 62 RBI. On October 25, it was revealed that Pedroia underwent surgery on his knee for a complete cartilage restoration, meaning that he would miss the start of the 2018 season.

==== 2018 ====
Following his late 2017 knee surgery, Pedroia started the 2018 Red Sox season on the disabled list. On May 14, he was optioned to the Triple-A Pawtucket Red Sox for a rehabilitation assignment. He was activated on May 26, but after three games (batting 1-for-11), he wound up back on the disabled list with left knee inflammation. On August 4, Pedroia was transferred to the 60-day disabled list. On September 7, the Red Sox announced that Pedroia would take no further part in any action for the remainder of 2018. The Red Sox finished the year 108–54 and went on to win the World Series over the Los Angeles Dodgers. Although Pedroia did not play in the postseason and was not on the team's World Series roster, he and other various personnel not on the World Series roster did receive 2018 World Series rings, as championship rings are issued by a team at their discretion.

==== 2019 ====
On March 7, 2019, Pedroia made his spring training debut, hitting a single in his lone at bat of the game while playing in the field for two innings; it was his first game action since May 2018. He began the season on the injured list. On April 4, he was sent to the Class A Greenville Drive on a rehabilitation assignment, where he played in three games, batting 3-for-9. Pedroia was activated for Boston's home opener on April 9, appeared in six games while batting 2-for-20 (.100/.143/.100), and returned to the injured list on April 18 due to left knee irritation. He began a rehabilitation assignment with Double-A Portland on May 2. On May 11, he was scratched from a start due to knee discomfort, and his assignment with Portland was halted on May 13. He restarted his rehabilitation, first with Triple-A Pawtucket on May 17, and then with Double-A Portland on May 24. Pedroia was removed from Portland's May 24 game due to left knee soreness.

After being evaluated, he announced on May 27 that he was going to take some time to evaluate his future. When asked if he would ever play again, he said "I'm not sure." The same day, the Red Sox moved Pedroia to the 60-day injured list. On August 6, Pedroia underwent a left knee joint preservation surgery. In 2019, he had the slowest sprint speed of all American League second basemen, at 25.0 feet/second.

==== 2020 ====
On January 21, 2020, it was reported that Pedroia suffered a "significant setback" with his left knee. On February 23, the team placed Pedroia on the 60-day injured list. Due to his injury, Pedroia missed the entirety of the shortened 2020 season.

==== Career statistics ====
In 1,512 games over 14 seasons, Pedroia posted a career .299 batting average (1805-for-6031) with 922 runs, 394 doubles, 15 triples, 140 home runs, 725 runs batted in, 138 stolen bases, 624 walks, .365 on-base percentage, and .439 slugging percentage. Defensively, he recorded a .991 fielding percentage as a second baseman. In 51 postseason games, he batted .233 (48-for-206) with 32 runs, 14 doubles, 5 home runs, 25 RBI, 3 stolen bases and 23 walks.

==== Retirement ====
On February 1, 2021, Pedroia announced his retirement from Major League Baseball after 14 seasons.

On June 25, 2021, the Red Sox honored Pedroia in a pre-game ceremony at Fenway Park, and announced his induction to the Boston Red Sox Hall of Fame as part of the class of 2022.

In 2025, his first year on the ballot for election to the Baseball Hall of Fame, Pedroia received 11.9% of votes, short of the 75% required for election. The following year, his vote total increased to 20.7%.

== Honors and awards ==
=== Amateur and minor league awards ===
- 2003 First Team All-American (Louisville Slugger)
- 2003 Pac-10 Co-Player of the Year
- 2003 NCAA Defensive Player of the Year
- 2004 Golden Spikes Award Finalist
- 2004 First-Team Baseball America and USA Today All-American
- Red Sox Minor League Base Runner of the Month (April 2005)
- Red Sox Minor League Quality Plate Appearances Award (June 2005)
- 2005 Post-Season Eastern League All-Star
- 2005 Red Sox Minor League Offensive Player of the Year
- 2005 Minor League News MLN FAB50 Baseball 2005 – No. 45
- Red Sox Minor League Defensive Player of the Month (June 2006)
- Red Sox Minor League Offensive Player of the Month (July 2006)
- 2006 Minor League News MLN FAB50 Baseball 2006 – No. 23
- 2006 International League All-Star

=== Major league awards ===
- 2007 American League Rookie of the Month–May
- 2007 American League Player of the Week (May 28 – June 3)
- 2007 Players Choice American League Outstanding Rookie
- 2007 World Series Champion (Boston Red Sox)
- 2007 American League Rookie of the Year
- 2008 American League All-Star Starter
- 2008 American League Gold Glove Winner
- 2008 American League Silver Slugger Award
- 2008 American League Most Valuable Player Award
- 2009 American League All-Star Starter
- 2010 American League All-Star Reserve
- 2010–12 Heart & Hustle Award Nominee
- 2011 American League Player of the Month–July
- 2011 Fielding Bible Award (at 2B, in all of MLB)
- 2011 American League Gold Glove Winner
- 2013 American League All-Star Reserve
- 2013 Wilson Overall Defensive Player of the Year Award (in entire American League)
- 2013 Fielding Bible Award (at 2B, in all of MLB)
- 2013 American League Gold Glove Winner
- 2013 Heart & Hustle Award Winner
- 2013 World Series Champion (Boston Red Sox)
- 2014 Fielding Bible Award (at 2B, in all of MLB)
- 2014 American League Gold Glove Winner
- 2014–16 Heart & Hustle Award Nominee
- 2016 Wilson Defensive Player of the Year Award (at 2B, in all of MLB)
- 2016 Fielding Bible Award (at 2B, in all of MLB)

Having last played in MLB in 2019, Pedroia was eligible to appear on the ballot for the National Baseball Hall of Fame class of 2025. He finished 14th in the voting, receiving 47 votes, short of the 296 needed for election.

== Personal life ==
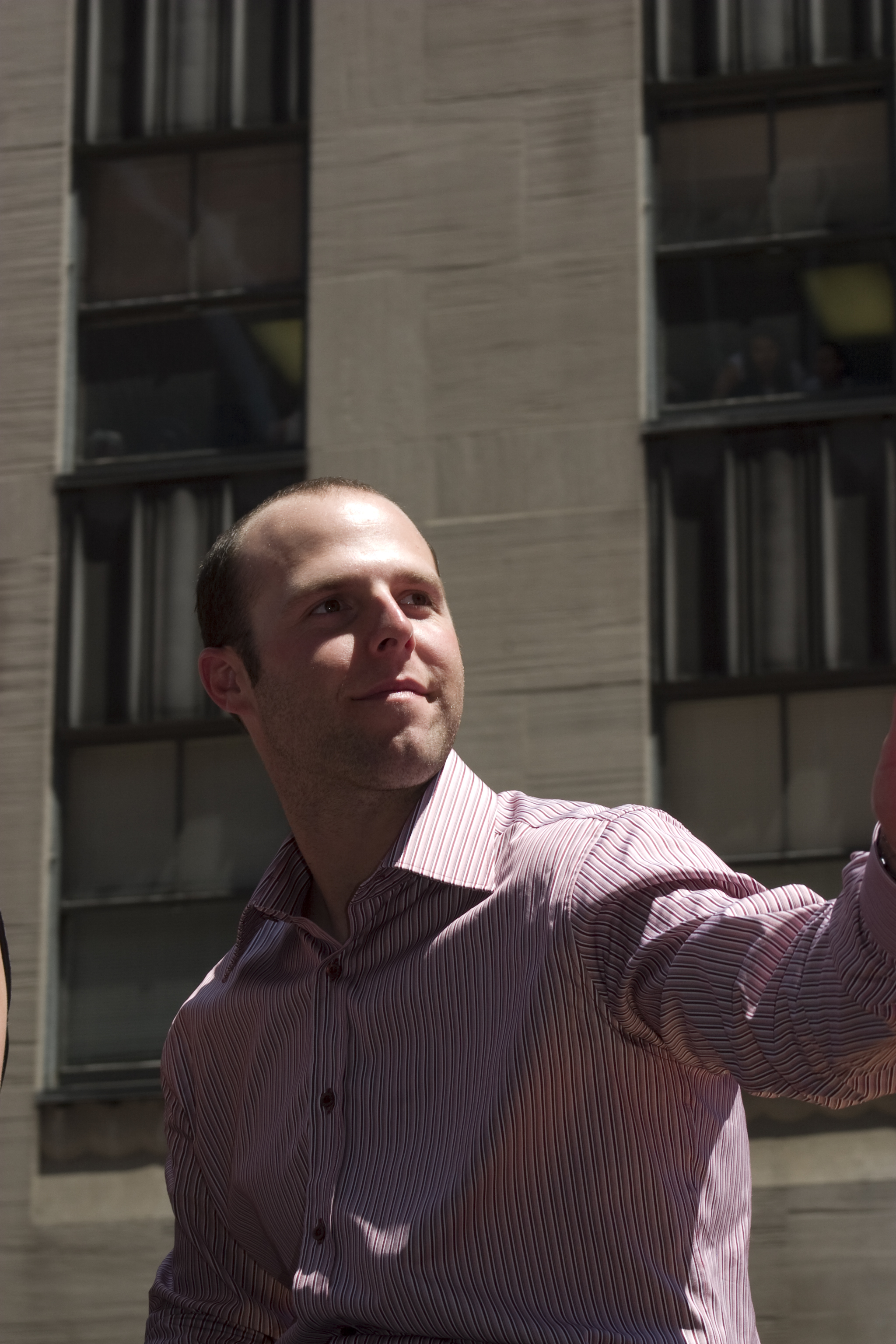
Pedroia in 2008

Pedroia has garnered multiple nicknames during his time in Boston, including Pedey, the Laser Show, and the Muddy Chicken. His family is of Swiss Italian and Portuguese heritage. The Red Sox officially lists Pedroia at 5 feet 9 inches (1.75 m), but he said he is 5 feet 7 inches (1.70 m) in 2016. Pedroia has expressed an interest in Bigfoot, including tweeting about the show Finding Bigfoot from his Twitter account. Pedroia enjoys playing the game cribbage; he and former manager Terry Francona used to play together. Pedroia is a fan of the NBA's Sacramento Kings, and the NFL's San Francisco 49ers.

On January 9, 2009, Pedroia was named as the cover athlete of the baseball video game MLB 09: The Show, and appeared in several commercials for the game.

In August 2009, Pedroia's wife, Kelli, gave birth to the couple's first child, a son. In September 2012, Pedroia's wife Kelli had a second son. In June 2014, the couple had their third son. They owned a home in Chestnut Hill, Massachusetts, but sold it in 2020. They reside in Chandler, Arizona. Pedroia is the nephew of Nebraska football associate head coach Phil Snow.

In a 2009 interview given to Boston magazine, Pedroia criticized his hometown of Woodland, California, calling it a "dump" and a city that never embraced him. This generated backlash from his hometown and his family received death threats. Pedroia later clarified his comments saying he was only joking and his comments were taken out of context. The original article's author, however, insisted that his use of the comment was not misleading. His transcript of the interview quoted Pedroia as saying "It's a dump. You can quote me on that. I don't give a shit."

Pedroia has authored an autobiography, and a children's book about Red Sox mascot Wally the Green Monster as a continuation of a series started by Jerry Remy:

- Pedroia, Dustin (2009). Born to Play: My Life in the Game. with Edward J. Delaney. Gallery Books. ISBN 978-1439157756.
- Pedroia, Dustin (2012). Wally the Green Monster's Journey Through Time. Illustrated by Gabhor Utomo. Mascot Books. ISBN 978-1-936319-83-1. Archived from the original on July 30, 2020.

== See also ==
- List of Major League Baseball annual runs scored leaders
- List of Silver Slugger Award winners at second base
- List of Gold Glove Award winners at second base
- List of Major League Baseball players who spent their entire career with one franchise

Awards and achievements
Preceded by Justin Verlander	Sporting News AL Rookie of the Year; 2007	Succeeded by Evan Longoria
Preceded by Justin Verlander	Players Choice AL Most Outstanding Rookie; 2007	Succeeded by Evan Longoria
Preceded by Ichiro Suzuki	Major League Hits Champion; 2008 (with Ichiro Suzuki)	Succeeded by Ichiro Suzuki
Preceded by Alex Rodriguez	American League Runs Scored Champion; 2008 & 2009	Succeeded by Mark Teixeira
Preceded by Magglio Ordóñez	Major League Doubles Champion; 2008	Succeeded by Brian Roberts
