= Arizona Diamondbacks award winners and league leaders =

This is a list of award winners and league leaders for the Arizona Diamondbacks professional baseball team. The Diamondbacks began play as a member of the National League in 1998 as a part of the most recent MLB expansion.

== Awards ==
=== Cy Young Award (NL) ===
- 1999 – Randy Johnson
- 2000 – Randy Johnson
- 2001 – Randy Johnson
- 2002 – Randy Johnson
- 2006 – Brandon Webb

=== Triple Crown ===
- 2002 – Randy Johnson

=== Rookie of the Year Award (NL) ===
- 2023 – Corbin Carroll

=== Manager of the Year Award (NL) ===
See footnote

- 2007 – Bob Melvin
- 2011 – Kirk Gibson
- 2017 – Torey Lovullo

=== Gold Glove Award (NL) ===
- Pitcher
  - Zack Greinke [4] (2016–2019)
- First base
  - Paul Goldschmidt [3] (2013, 2015, 2017)
  - Christian Walker [3] (2022–2024)
- Second base
  - Orlando Hudson [2] (2006, 2007)
- Shortstop
  - Nick Ahmed [2] (2018, 2019)
  - Geraldo Perdomo (2026)
- Outfield
  - Steve Finley [3] (1999, 2000, 2004)
  - Gerardo Parra [2] (2011, 2013)
  - A. J. Pollock (2015)
  - David Peralta (2019)
  - Corbin Carroll (2026)
- Catcher
  - Gabriel Moreno [2] (2023, 2026)

=== Silver Slugger Award (NL) ===
- Pitcher
  - Micah Owings (2007)
  - Daniel Hudson (2011)
  - Zack Greinke (2019)
- Catcher
  - Gabriel Moreno (2026)
- First base
  - Paul Goldschmidt [4] (2013, 2015, 2017, 2018)
- Second base
  - Aaron Hill (2012)
  - Ketel Marte [2] (2024, 2025)
- Shortstop
  - Geraldo Perdomo (2025)
- Outfield
  - Corbin Carroll (2025)
  - Luis Gonzalez (2001)
  - Justin Upton (2011)
  - David Peralta (2018)

=== World Series Most Valuable Player Award ===
- 2001 – Randy Johnson
- 2001 – Curt Schilling

=== National League Championship Series Most Valuable Player Award ===
- 2001 – Craig Counsell
- 2023 – Ketel Marte

=== All-MLB Team ===
- First team
  - Corbin Carroll (OF: 2023)
  - Zac Gallen (SP: 2023)
  - Ketel Marte (2B: 2024, 2025)
  - Gabriel Moreno (C: 2026)
- Second team
  - Corbin Carroll (OF: 2025)
  - Zack Greinke (SP: 2019)

=== Rolaids Relief Man Award ===
- 2007 – José Valverde

=== Roberto Clemente Award ===
- 2001 – Curt Schilling

=== Hank Aaron Award (NL) ===
- 2013 – Paul Goldschmidt

=== Wilson Defensive Player of the Year Award ===
- 2013 – Gerardo Parra (NL)

=== Warren Spahn Award ===
- 1999 – Randy Johnson
- 2000 – Randy Johnson
- 2001 – Randy Johnson
- 2002 – Randy Johnson

=== Lou Gehrig Memorial Award ===
- 2000 – Todd Stottlemyre

=== Branch Rickey Award ===
- 2000 – Todd Stottlemyre
- 2001 – Curt Schilling
- 2005 – Luis Gonzalez

=== Baseball America Rookie of the Year Award ===
- 2003 – Brandon Webb
- 2023 – Corbin Carroll

=== The Sporting News Pitcher of the Year Award ===
- 2001 – Curt Schilling
- 2002 – Curt Schilling

=== The Sporting News Reliever of the Year Award ===
- 2007 – José Valverde

=== The Sporting News Rookie of the Year Award ===
- 2012 – Wade Miley
- 2023 – Corbin Carroll

=== The Sporting News Manager of the Year Award ===
See footnote

- 2007 – Bob Melvin
- 2011 – Kirk Gibson

=== Topps All-Star Rookie Team ===
- 2003 – Brandon Webb (RHP)
- 2004 – Chad Tracy (3B)
- 2007 – Chris Young (OF)
- 2012 – Wade Miley (LHP)
- 2023 – Corbin Carroll (OF)

== Team awards ==
- 1999 – NL West Division title
- 2001 – NL West Division title
- 2001 – Warren C. Giles Trophy (National League pennant)
- 2001 – Commissioner's Trophy (World Series champion)
- 2002 – NL West Division title
- 2013 – Defensive Team of the Year
- 2015 – Defensive Team of the Year
- 2018 – Defensive Team of the Year
- 2023 – Warren C. Giles Trophy (National League pennant)

== All-Star Game selections ==
Pitcher

- Patrick Corbin [2] (2013, 2018)
- Zac Gallen (2023)
- Zack Greinke [3] (2017, 2018, 2019)
- Dan Haren [2] (2008, 2009)
- Randy Johnson [5] (1999, 2000, 2001, 2002, 2004)
- Byung-hyun Kim (2002)
- Joe Mantiply (2022)
- Wade Miley (2012)
- Robbie Ray (2017)
- Eduardo Rodríguez (2026)
- Curt Schilling [2] (2001, 2002)
- José Valverde (2007)
- Brandon Webb [3] (2006, 2007, 2008)

Catcher

- Damian Miller (2002)
- Miguel Montero [2] (2011, 2014)

First baseman

- Paul Goldschmidt [6] (2013, 2014, 2015, 2016, 2017, 2018)

Second baseman

- Jay Bell (1999)
- Orlando Hudson (2007)
- Ketel Marte [3] (2019, 2024, 2025)
- Junior Spivey (2002)

Third baseman

- Eduardo Escobar (2021)
- Jake Lamb (2017)
- Eugenio Suárez (2025)
- Matt Williams (1999)

Shortstop

- Geraldo Perdomo (2023)

Outfielder

- Corbin Carroll [3] (2023, 2025, 2026)
- Steve Finley (2000)
- Luis Gonzalez [5] (1999, 2001, 2002, 2003, 2005)
- Lourdes Gurriel Jr. (2023)
- A. J. Pollock (2015)
- Justin Upton [2] (2009, 2011)
- Devon White (1998)
- Chris Young (2010)

Manager

- Bob Brenly (2002)
- Torey Lovullo (2024)

Italics indicates selected starters

== Minor league awards ==
=== USA Today Minor League Player of the Year Award ===
- 2007 – Justin Upton (Mobile BayBears, AA & Visalia Oaks, High-A)
- 2011 – Paul Goldschmidt (Mobile BayBears, AA)
- 2022 – Corbin Carroll (Reno Aces, AAA & Amarillo Sod Poodles, AA)

=== Joe Bauman Home Run Award ===
- 2019 – Kevin Cron (Reno Aces, AAA)

=== Pacific Coast League Top MLB Prospect Award ===
- 2008 – Josh Whitesell (Salt Lake Stingers, AAA)
- 2011 – Collin Cowgill (Reno Aces, AAA)
- 2012 – Adam Eaton (Reno Aces, AAA)
- 2013 – Chris Owings (Reno Aces, AAA)
- 2024 – Deyvison De Los Santos (Reno Aces, AAA)

=== Southern League Most Valuable Player Award ===
- 2011 – Paul Goldschmidt (Mobile BayBears, AA)
- 2014 – Jake Lamb (Mobile BayBears, AA)
- 2017 – Kevin Cron (Jackson Generals, AA)

=== Southern League Pitcher of the Year Award ===
- 2013 – Archie Bradley (Mobile BayBears, AA)

=== Texas League Most Valuable Player Award ===
- 2002 – Chad Tracy (El Paso Diablos, AA)

=== Midwest League Most Valuable Player Award ===
- 2005 – Carlos González (South Bend Silver Hawks, A)
- 2019 – Alek Thomas (Kane County Cougars, A)

=== Midwest League Top MLB Prospect Award ===
- 2005 – Carlos González (South Bend Silver Hawks, A)
- 2014 – Andrew Velazquez (South Bend Silver Hawks, A)

=== California League Most Valuable Player Award ===
- 1998 – Brad Penny (High Desert Mavericks, High-A)
- 2010 – Paul Goldschmidt (Visalia Rawhide, High-A)

=== Northwest League Most Valuable Player Award ===
- 2003 – Conor Jackson (Yakima Bears, Short-A)
- 2006 – Cyle Hankerd (Yakima Bears, Short-A)

== Other achievements ==
=== National Baseball Hall of Fame ===
Three individuals who spent part of their careers with the Diamondbacks have been inducted into the National Baseball Hall of Fame. † indicates player was inducted as a Diamondback. Names in bold are depicted on their Hall of Fame plaques wearing a Diamondbacks cap insignia.

Player	Years with D-backs	Role with D-backs	Inducted as	Year inducted	Vote%	Ballot or Election type
Roberto Alomar	2004	Player	Player	2011	90.0%	2nd ballot
**Randy Johnson**	1999–2004, 2007–2008	Player	Player	2015	97.3%	1st ballot
Alan Trammell	2011–2014	Coach, manager	Player	2018	81.3%	Modern Baseball Era Committee

=== Ford C. Frick Award recipients ===
Names in bold received the award based primarily on their work as broadcasters for the Diamondbacks.

- Joe Garagiola

== National League leaders ==
=== Hitting ===
==== Batting champions ====
- 2026 – Gabriel Moreno (.311)

==== Triples ====
- 1998 – David Dellucci (12)
- 2000 – Tony Womack (14)
- 2003 – Steve Finley (10)
- 2015 – David Peralta (10)
- 2016 – Chris Owings (11)
- 2018 – Ketel Marte (12)
- 2019 – Eduardo Escobar (10)
- 2021 – David Peralta (8)
- 2023 – Corbin Carroll (10)
- 2024 – Corbin Carroll (14)
- 2025 – Corbin Carroll (17)
- 2026 – Corbin Carroll (17)

==== Home runs ====
- 2013 – Paul Goldschmidt (36)

==== Runs batted in ====
- 2013 – Paul Goldschmidt (125)

==== Stolen bases ====
- 1999 – Tony Womack (72)

=== Pitching ===
==== Wins ====
- 2001 – Curt Schilling (22)
- 2002 – Randy Johnson (24)
- 2006 – Brandon Webb (16)
- 2008 – Brandon Webb (22)
- 2011 – Ian Kennedy (21)

==== Saves ====
- 2007 – José Valverde (47)

==== Shutouts ====
- 2000 – Randy Johnson (3)
- 2006 – Brandon Webb (3)
- 2007 – Brandon Webb (3)
- 2018 – Patrick Corbin (1)
- 2023 – Zac Gallen (1)

==== Strikeouts ====
- 1999 – Randy Johnson (364)
- 2000 – Randy Johnson (347)
- 2001 – Randy Johnson (372)
- 2002 – Randy Johnson (334)
- 2004 – Randy Johnson (290)

==== Earned run average ====
- 1999 – Randy Johnson (2.48)
- 2001 – Randy Johnson (2.49)
- 2002 – Randy Johnson (2.32)

== See also ==
- Baseball awards
- List of Major League Baseball awards
