= Wilson Defensive Player of the Year Award =

Major League Baseball award

- Sport: Baseball
- League: Major League Baseball
- Awarded for: Best defensive player at each position; best overall defensive player; best defensive team
- Sponsored by: Wilson Sporting Goods
- Presented by: Major League Baseball

History
- First award: 2012; 14 years ago
- Most recent: Roberto Pérez (overall); Houston Astros (team)

The Wilson Defensive Player of the Year Award was awarded annually to the best defensive player at each fielding position in Major League Baseball (MLB). The award was given between 2012 and 2019. An overall Defensive Player of the Year and a Defensive Team of the Year were also selected annually. Unlike the Rawlings Gold Glove Awards, which are voted on by major league managers and coaches, the Wilson Defensive Player of the Year Award winners were determined by statistics using sabermetrics.

== History ==
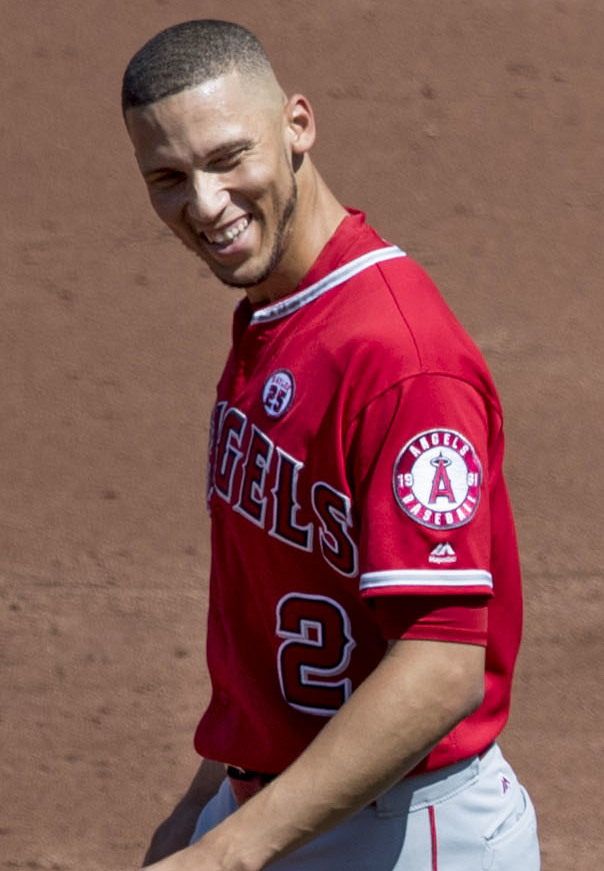
Andrelton Simmons received a Defensive Player of the Year Award six times as a shortstop.

In 2012, baseball glove manufacturer Wilson created the Defensive Player of the Year Award to honor the best defensive player on each team in Major League Baseball (MLB). Additionally, one player was selected from each league as that league's overall Defensive Player of the Year. Starting in 2014, the individual awards are given to the best defensive player at each position, regardless of league, and there is a single Defensive Player of the Year for all of MLB. Since 2012, a single Defensive Team of the Year across all of MLB has also been named.

Various players have won a Defensive Player award multiple times, with Andrelton Simmons having the most wins, six. Zack Greinke is the only pitcher to have won multiple times, three. Denard Span was the first person to receive Defensive Player awards with two different teams, and in both leagues, having won in 2012 with the Minnesota Twins and in 2013 with the Washington Nationals. No one has been named Overall Defensive Player more than once, although the Atlanta Braves have had three winners and the Boston Red Sox have had two winners. The Arizona Diamondbacks are the only team to have been named Defensive Team of the Year multiple times, three.

== Key ==
Year	Links to the corresponding Major League Baseball season
1B	First baseman
2B	Second baseman
3B	Third baseman
SS	Shortstop
LF	Left fielder
CF	Center fielder
RF	Right fielder
C	Catcher
P	Pitcher

== Winners ==
During the first two years, the award was given to the best defensive player on each team in Major League Baseball. Starting in 2014, the award is given to the best fielder at each position in all of Major League Baseball. Numbers after a player's name indicate multiple times winning the award.

=== American League (2012–2013) ===
2012
Player	Team	Position
J. J. Hardy	Baltimore Orioles	SS
Dustin Pedroia	Boston Red Sox	2B
Robinson Canó	New York Yankees	2B
José Molina	Tampa Bay Rays	C
Brett Lawrie	Toronto Blue Jays	3B
Alexei Ramírez	Chicago White Sox	SS
Jason Kipnis	Cleveland Indians	2B
Austin Jackson	Detroit Tigers	OF
Lorenzo Cain	Kansas City Royals	OF
Denard Span	Minnesota Twins	OF
Mike Trout	Los Angeles Angels of Anaheim	OF
Josh Reddick	Oakland Athletics	OF
Brendan Ryan	Seattle Mariners	SS
Adrián Beltré	Texas Rangers	3B

=== National League (2012–2013) ===
2012
Player	Team	Position
Michael Bourn	Atlanta Braves	OF
Giancarlo Stanton	Miami Marlins	OF
David Wright	New York Mets	3B
Carlos Ruiz	Philadelphia Phillies	C
Adam LaRoche	Washington Nationals	1B
Darwin Barney	Chicago Cubs	2B
Brandon Phillips	Cincinnati Reds	2B
Justin Maxwell	Houston Astros	OF
Carlos Gómez	Milwaukee Brewers	OF
Andrew McCutchen	Pittsburgh Pirates	OF
Yadier Molina	St. Louis Cardinals	C
Aaron Hill	Arizona Diamondbacks	2B
Carlos González	Colorado Rockies	OF
Matt Kemp	Los Angeles Dodgers	OF
Chase Headley	San Diego Padres	3B
Brandon Crawford	San Francisco Giants	SS

2013
Player	Team	Position
Manny Machado	Baltimore Orioles	3B
Dustin Pedroia (2)	Boston Red Sox	2B
Robinson Canó (2)	New York Yankees	2B
Evan Longoria	Tampa Bay Rays	3B
Colby Rasmus	Toronto Blue Jays	OF
Gordon Beckham	Chicago White Sox	2B
Yan Gomes	Cleveland Indians	C
Austin Jackson (2)	Detroit Tigers	OF
Lorenzo Cain (2)	Kansas City Royals	OF
Brian Dozier	Minnesota Twins	2B
J. B. Shuck	Los Angeles Angels of Anaheim	OF
Matt Dominguez	Houston Astros	3B
Josh Reddick (2)	Oakland Athletics	OF
Dustin Ackley	Seattle Mariners	2B
Craig Gentry	Texas Rangers	OF

2013
Player	Team	Position
Andrelton Simmons	Atlanta Braves	SS
Donovan Solano	Miami Marlins	2B
Juan Lagares	New York Mets	OF
Carlos Ruiz (2)	Philadelphia Phillies	C
Denard Span (2)	Washington Nationals	OF
Darwin Barney (2)	Chicago Cubs	2B
Jay Bruce	Cincinnati Reds	OF
Carlos Gómez (2)	Milwaukee Brewers	OF
Russell Martin	Pittsburgh Pirates	C
Yadier Molina (2)	St. Louis Cardinals	C
Gerardo Parra	Arizona Diamondbacks	OF
DJ LeMahieu	Colorado Rockies	2B
Juan Uribe	Los Angeles Dodgers	3B
Chris Denorfia	San Diego Padres	OF
Gregor Blanco	San Francisco Giants	OF

=== Major League Baseball (2014–2019) ===
Year	1B	2B	3B	SS	LF	CF	RF	C	P	Ref.
2014	Adrián González	Ian Kinsler	Juan Uribe (2)	Andrelton Simmons (2)	Alex Gordon	Lorenzo Cain (3)	Jason Heyward	Russell Martin (2)	Johnny Cueto	
2015	Paul Goldschmidt	Dee Gordon	Nolan Arenado	Andrelton Simmons (3)	Starling Marte	Kevin Pillar	Jason Heyward (2)	Buster Posey	Jacob deGrom	
2016	Anthony Rizzo	Dustin Pedroia (3)	Nolan Arenado (2)	Brandon Crawford (2)	Brett Gardner	Kevin Kiermaier	Mookie Betts	Buster Posey (2)	Zack Greinke	
2017	Carlos Santana	DJ LeMahieu (2)	Nolan Arenado (3)	Andrelton Simmons (4)	Alex Gordon (2)	Byron Buxton	Yasiel Puig	Martin Maldonado	Tyler Chatwood	
2018	Freddie Freeman	DJ LeMahieu (3)	Matt Chapman	Andrelton Simmons (5)	Alex Gordon (3)	Kevin Kiermaier (2)	Mookie Betts (2)	Mike Zunino	Zack Greinke (2)	
2019	Freddie Freeman (2)	Kolten Wong	Matt Chapman (2)	Andrelton Simmons (6)	David Peralta	Lorenzo Cain (4)	Aaron Judge	Roberto Pérez	Zack Greinke (3)	

== Overall Defensive Player of the Year ==
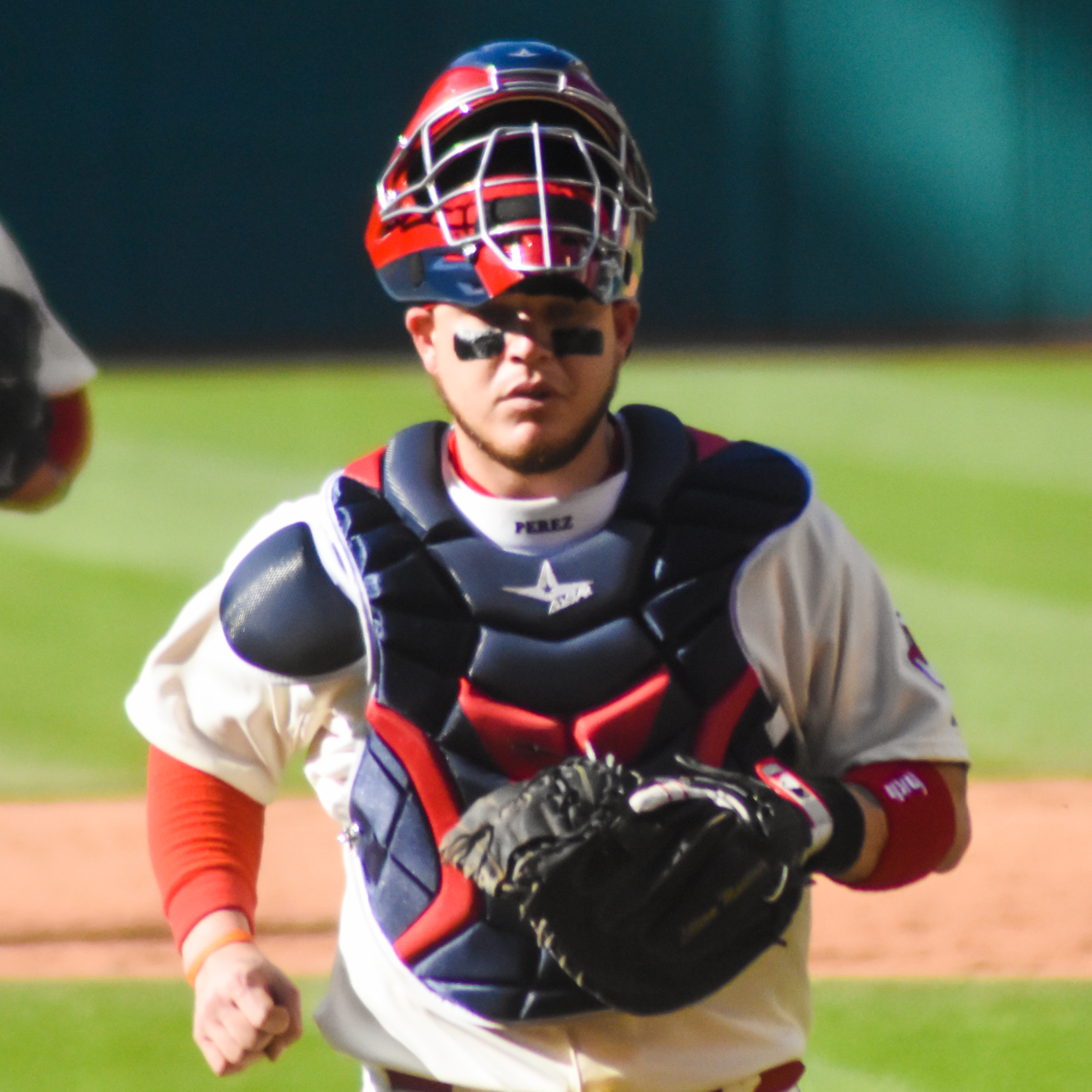
Roberto Pérez, 2019 Defensive Player of the Year

The Overall Defensive Player of the Year Award was inaugurated in 2012, with one player each from the American and National Leagues receiving the award. In 2014, the separate awards per league were eliminated, and in 2015 to 2019 only one player in all of Major League Baseball received the honor.

Year	League	Player	Team	Pos.	Ref.
2012 (AL)	American	Mike Trout	Los Angeles Angels of Anaheim	OF	
2012 (NL)	National	Michael Bourn	Atlanta Braves	OF	
2013 (AL)	American	Dustin Pedroia	Boston Red Sox	2B	
2013 (NL)	National	Gerardo Parra	Arizona Diamondbacks	OF	
2014	National	Jason Heyward	Atlanta Braves	RF	
2015	National	Andrelton Simmons	Atlanta Braves	SS	
2016	American	Mookie Betts	Boston Red Sox	RF	
2017	American	Byron Buxton	Minnesota Twins	CF	
2018	American	Matt Chapman	Oakland Athletics	3B	
2019	American	Roberto Pérez	Cleveland Indians	C	

== Defensive Team of the Year ==
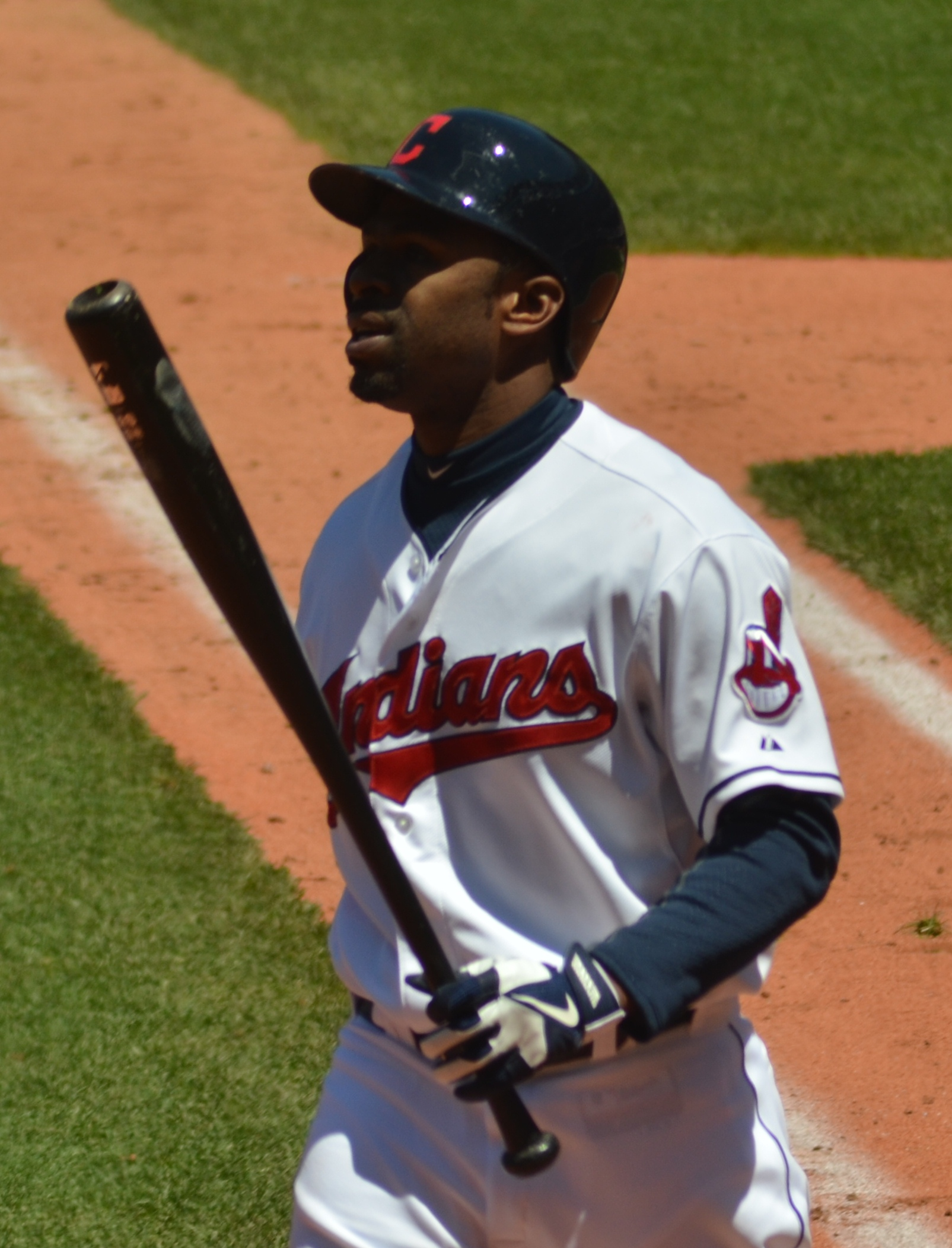
Michael Bourn was a member of the 2012 Atlanta Braves, first Defensive Team of the Year award winner.

Numbers after a team's name indicate multiple times winning the award.

Year	Team	League	Ref.
2012	Atlanta Braves	National	
2013	Arizona Diamondbacks	National	
2014	Cincinnati Reds	National	
2015	Arizona Diamondbacks (2)	National	
2016	San Francisco Giants	National	
2017	Los Angeles Dodgers	National	
2018	Arizona Diamondbacks (3)	National	
2019	Houston Astros	American	

== See also ==
- Fielding Bible Award
- Esurance MLB Awards – includes Best Defensive Player
- Baseball awards § United States
