= European Food Information Resource Network =

EuroFIR AISBL
- Founder: Former partner institutions of EuroFIR NoE
- Type: Non-profit
- Location: Brussels, Belgium
- Region served: Worldwide
- Product: Food Information
- Method: Research, service provision, consultancy
- Members: 80
- Key people: Paul Finglas (President); Prof Maria Glibetic, Prof Barbara Korousic Seljak, Dr Aida Turrini, Luísa Oliveira and Susanne Westenbrink (Executive directors)
- Employees: 4
- Website: eurofir.org

EuroFIR (European Food Information Resource) is a non-profit international association, which supports use of existing food composition data and future resources through cooperation and harmonization of data quality, functionality and global standards.

The purpose of the association is the development, management, publication and exploitation of food composition data, and the promotion of international cooperation and harmonization through improved data quality, food composition database searchability and standards, for example, with the European Committee for Standardization on the standard for food data. Other work includes that on ethnic and traditional foods and critical evaluation of data on nutrients

== Membership ==
=== Full members ===
(*) Member organisations, which are also national food composition database compilers.

Institution	Acronym	Country
Agricultural University of Athens	AUA	Greece
British Nutrition Foundation	BNF	United Kingdom
ETH Zurich	ETHZ	Switzerland
French Agency for Food, Environmental and Occupational Health and Safety	ANSES *	France
Food Research Institute	FRI *	Slovakia
FoodCon	FCN	Belgium
Hellenic Health Foundation	HHF *	Greece
Institute of Food Research	IFR *	United Kingdom
Institute of Medical Research, University of Belgrade	IMR *	Serbia
Institute of Public Health and the Environment	RIVM *	Netherlands
Instituto Nacional de Saúde Dr. Ricardo Jorge	INSA *	Portugal
Istituto Nazionale di Ricerca per gli Alimenti e la Nutrizione	INRAN *	Italy
Ricerca dell'Istituto Europeo di Oncologica	IEO *	Italy
National Food & Nutrition Institute	NFNI	Poland
National Institute for Health and Welfare	THL *	Finland
Nutrienten Belgie vzw	NUBEL *	Belgium
National Food Administration	NFA *	Sweden
Swedish University of Agricultural Sciences	SLU	Sweden
The National Food Institute at the Technical University of Denmark	DTU *	Denmark
The Norwegian Food Safety Authority	NFSA	Norway
Tubitak Marmara Research Centre	TUBITAK *	Turkey
University College Cork	UCC *	Ireland
University of Helsinki	UHEL	Finland
University of Leeds	UL	United Kingdom
Wageningen University	WU	Netherlands

=== Associate members ===
(*) Member organisations, which are also national food composition database compilers.

Institution	Acronym	Country
Food Centre of Food and Veterinary Service of Latvia	FCF-VS *	Latvia
Food Standards Australia New Zealand	FSANZ *	Australia
Gent University	UGENT	Belgium
Government of Canada		Canada
Institute of Agricultural Economics and Information	IAEI	Czech Republic
Jožef Stefan Institute	JSI *	Slovenia
Matis - Icelandic Food and Biotech R&D	MATIS *	Iceland
Max Rubner Institute	MRI *	Germany
State Environmental Health Centre	SEHC *	Lithuania
University of Granada	UGR *	Spain
University of Vienna	UVI	Austria

=== Ordinary members ===
Institution	Acronym	Country
Culmarex S.A.		Spain
Ian D. Unwin Food Information Consultancy	IDUFIC	United Kingdom
Ministry of Health and Consumer Affairs of the Balearic Islands		Spain
Polytec	Polytec	Denmark
Procter & Gamble		United Kingdom
REPLY Santer	REPLY	Italy
Treviso Tecnologia - Azienda Speciale per l'Innovazione della Camera Di Commercio Di Treviso	TVT	Italy
Uzhhorod National University Medical Faculty		Ukraine
Universidad Complutense De Madrid		Spain
Universidad Politecnica de Cartagena	UPCT	Spain
Universita Del Salento		Italy
University of Ljubljana	UoL	Slovenia
University of Vigo	UoV	Spain
University of Wolverhampton	UoW	United Kingdom
Verein zur Förderung des Technologietransfers an der Hochschule Bremerhaven e.V.	TTZ	Germany
vitakid gemeinnützige GmbH		Germany
Zeinler Financial & Partner GmbH		Austria

=== Honoured members ===
Institution	Acronym	Country
Danish Food Information	DFI *	Denmark

List of EuroFIR AISBL key people, members and collaborators on the EuroFIR website.
