= International Food Code =

Unique identifiers

Many national food composition databases (FCDB) encode foods with unique codes to enable consistent identification and data exchange. International collaborative efforts such as Food and Agriculture Organization International Network of Food Data Systems (FAO/INFOODS) guidelines recommend unique food identifiers, and secondary resources use a composite identifier format that has been referred to as an International Food Code (IFC) to reference foods across multiple FCDBs.

== Structure of an IFC ==
An IFC begins with a database identifier: An ISO 3166-1 alpha-2 code which identifies the source country, followed by a two digit code which represents the year of publication of the source database. A dot is usually used to separate the database identifier from the food code used by the publisher. The publisher's code can be up to 8 characters long, so the maximum length for an IFC is 12 characters, excluding the optional dot.

== Examples ==
GB15.14-318
The code above shows "Bananas, flesh only" from UK published "COFIDS Includes McCance & Widdowson 2021"
IE09.5068
The code above shows "Porridge, made with low fat milk" from Irish published "Irish Food Composition database 2009"
US15.15083
The code above shows "Fish, salmon, pink, raw" from US published "United States Department of Agriculture, SR28 2015"

== Use on Barcodes and numeric systems ==
A common variation on the IFC structure is to replace the leading ISO 3166-1 alpha-2 letters with their numeric equivalents. The publisher's code is then prefixed with leading zeros and the dot is excluded to create a 13 digit code. This allows the IFC to be used as a Universal Product Code for barcode identification.

Example: GB15.14-318 becomes 8261500014318
