= Phenol-Explorer =

Content
- Description: Food polyphenol database

Contact
- Research center: INRA
- Laboratory: Unité de Nutrition Humaine, Clermont-Ferrand, France
- Primary citation: Neveu & al. (2010)
- Release date: 2009

Access
- Website: http://www.phenol-explorer.eu/

Miscellaneous
- Version: 3.0

Phenol-Explorer is a comprehensive database on natural phenols and polyphenols including food composition, food processing, and polyphenol metabolites in human and experimental animals.

== See also ==
- Food composition data
