= Food composition data =

Data on chemical composition of food

Food composition data (FCD) are detailed sets of information on the nutritionally important components of foods and provide values for energy and nutrients including protein, carbohydrates, fat, vitamins and minerals and for other important food components such as fibre. The data are presented in food composition databases (FCDBs).

In the UK, FCD is listed in tables known as The Chemical Composition of Foods, McCance and Widdowson (1940) and in the first edition the authors stated that:

‘A knowledge of the chemical composition of foods is the first essential in the dietary treatment of disease or in any quantitative study of human nutrition’.

This demonstrates the main reason for establishing FCD at that time. To this day, food composition studies remain central to nutrition research into the role of food components and their interactions in health and disease. However, due to increasing levels of sophistication and complexity in nutrition science, there is a greater demand for complete, current and reliable FCD, together with information on a wider range of food components, including bioactive compounds.

FCD are important in many fields including clinical practice, research, nutrition policy, public health and education, and the food manufacturing industry and is used in a variety of ways including: national programmes for the assessment of diet and nutritional status at a population level (e.g. epidemiological researchers assessing diets at a population level); development of therapeutic diets (e.g. to treat obesity, diabetes, nutritional deficiencies, food allergy and intolerance) and institutional diets (e.g. schools, hospitals, prisons, day-care centres) and nutrition labelling of processed foods.

The earliest food composition tables were based solely on chemical analyses of food samples, which were mostly undertaken specifically for the tables. However, as the food supply has evolved, and with the increasing demand for nutritional and related components, it has become more difficult for compilers to rely only on chemical analysis when compiling FCDBs. For example, in the UK the third edition of The Composition of Foods presented data on vitamin content of foods. However, due to the amount of information already available and in order to avoid the need to analyse every food for every vitamin, values from the scientific literature were included, although the tables are still predominately based on analytical data. Nowadays, food composition databases tend to be compiled using a variety of methods as described below.

== Chemical analysis ==
Chemical analysis of food samples carried out in analytical laboratories is typically the preferred method for creating FCD. The food samples are carefully chosen using a defined sampling plan to ensure that they are representative of the foods being consumed in a country. This includes accounting for factors that could affect the nutrient content of a food as purchased (e.g. region and/or country of origin, season, brand, fortification) or as consumed (e.g. storage, preparation and cooking methods). If necessary, further preparation and cooking takes place prior to the analysis using appropriate analytical methods and often appropriate samples of foods are combined rather than taking averages of individually analysed food samples. Ideally, the methods used for analysis should have been shown to be reliable and reproducible, i.e. those recommended by organisation such as the Association of Official Analytical Chemists (AOAC) or the International Organization for Standardization (ISO).

== Imputing and calculating values from data already within the database ==
It is not feasible to determine FCD using chemical analysis for every nutrient in every food type due to insufficient resources. Therefore, compilers of FCDB use other approaches to determine the required FCD within a FCDB. For example, to estimate values for a cooked food values for a raw food or dish can often be used, together with information on likely weight (or yield) gain/loss and nutrient changes (e.g. vitamin losses) due to cooking.

== Estimating FCD values from other sources ==
Another approach commonly used by FCD compilers is to ‘borrow’ or ‘adopt’ nutrient values that were originally generated by another organisation. Possible sources for borrowed data: are FCD from other countries, nutrient analyses from scientific literature or manufacturers’ data (e.g. from food labels). Compilers will need to evaluate the data in terms of both data quality and applicability of foods before incorporating it from any of these sources into their FCDBs. For example, fortification values can differ between countries so a fortified breakfast cereal for one country’s FCD might not be appropriate for another country.

== Data evaluation and quality ==
An important step for both new analytical FCD and for values borrowed from other sources is for the compiler to evaluate the quality of the data before it can be added into FCDBs. Basic evaluation, where feasible, should be considered such as comparing the values to similar foods from other sources and checking whether the sums of the values equate to ~100% e.g. sum of water, protein, fat, carbohydrate and dietary fibre. In addition, a range of data quality measures need to be undertaken relating to the food identity and sampling and analytical aspects. For example, the USA has developed a multi-nutrient data quality evaluation system for which five evaluation categories are used including: sampling plan, number of samples, sample handling, analytical method and analytical quality control. Ratings for each category are combined to give a ‘Quality Index’ and a confidence code indicating to users the level of confidence for each value. In Europe, EuroFIR is currently developing a data quality evaluation system for European data based on the USA’s version.

== Food composition dataset ==
Food composition datasets (FCDBs) or food composition tables are resources that provide detailed food composition data (FCD) on the nutritionally important components of foods. FCDBs provide values for energy and nutrients including protein, carbohydrates, fat, vitamins and minerals and for other important food components such as fibre.

Before computer technology, these resources existed in printed tables with the oldest tables dating back to the early 19th century.

In the UK, FCD are listed in tables known as The Chemical Composition of Foods, McCance and Widdowson (1940). FCDBs have become available online on the internet, for example, the USDA Dataset in the States, the Japanese food composition dataset and a number of European food composition datasets. Foods from these national FCDBs can be identified by International Food Code (IFC).

FCDBs differ in both the data that is available and in the amount of data that is held. For example, some FCDBs have values for individual amino acids and/or vitamin fractions (e.g. individual carotenoids, such as lycopene and lutein). Some specialised datasets are also available e.g. bioactive compounds are included in the EuroFIR eBASIS dataset, in the US isoflavone dataset and in the French Phenol-Explorer dataset. In addition, the 2009 version of the Swiss FCDB contains 935 foods, while the recent version of the USDA FCDB includes over 7,500 foods. Some datasets include a wider range of processed foods, composite dishes and recipes as well as foods prepared and cooked in different ways. For example, in the UK FCDB bacon rashers are included as raw, dry-fried, grilled, grilled crispy or microwaved.

The data are estimations.

- Variability in the composition of foods between countries, owing to, for example, season, cultivar or variety, brand, fortification levels
- Incomplete coverage of foods or nutrients leading to missing values
- Age of data (limited resources mean that, inevitably, some values are not current)

=== Collection process ===
FCDBs are usually created using a variety of methods including (see Food composition data):

- Chemical analysis of food samples carried out in analytical laboratories
- Imputing and calculating values from data already within the dataset
- Estimating values from other sources, including manufacturers food labels, scientific literature and FCDBs from other countries.

=== History ===
Some of the earliest work related to detecting adulterated foods and finding the active components of medicinal herbs.

Food composition tables in the format known today were published towards the end of the 19th century although, some tables on the chemical composition of mineral waters were assembled by Morveau as early as 1780. In 1896, tables from the USA were published, incorporating nearly 2600 analyses of a wide range of foods including the main food groups, as well as some processed foods. Values for foods were presented as ‘refuse’, water, protein, fats, carbohydrates, ash, and ‘fuel value’.

The first UK tables, known as McCance and Widdowson’s The Composition of Foods, were published in 1940. The Food and Agriculture Organization (FAO) published tables for international use and initially intended these for the assessment of food availability at the global level. A list of International FCDBs can be found on the National Food Institute - Technical University of Denmark's (DTU) website.

== Documentation ==
The documentation of FCD is an important process of compiling FCDBs because it enables the user to assess the quality of the data and whether the food and values are appropriate for the user’s intended purpose. Moreover, documentation is valuable to the compilers, both to update the FCDB and to validate decisions made during compilation. With systems generally now being computerised, it is much easier to make documentation available. For example, the French national database provides information, where possible, on minimum and maximum values found from the different data sources used, the number of samples used to determine the selected value, a reference code corresponding to data sources for a given value, and a confidence code characterising the quality of the given value. EuroFIR has developed a framework for the documentation of FCD, which forms the basis of a new European standard for the interchange and harmonisation of FCD across Europe.

== See also ==
- Nutrition analysis
