= Gerardo Parra =

Venezuelan baseball player (born 1987)

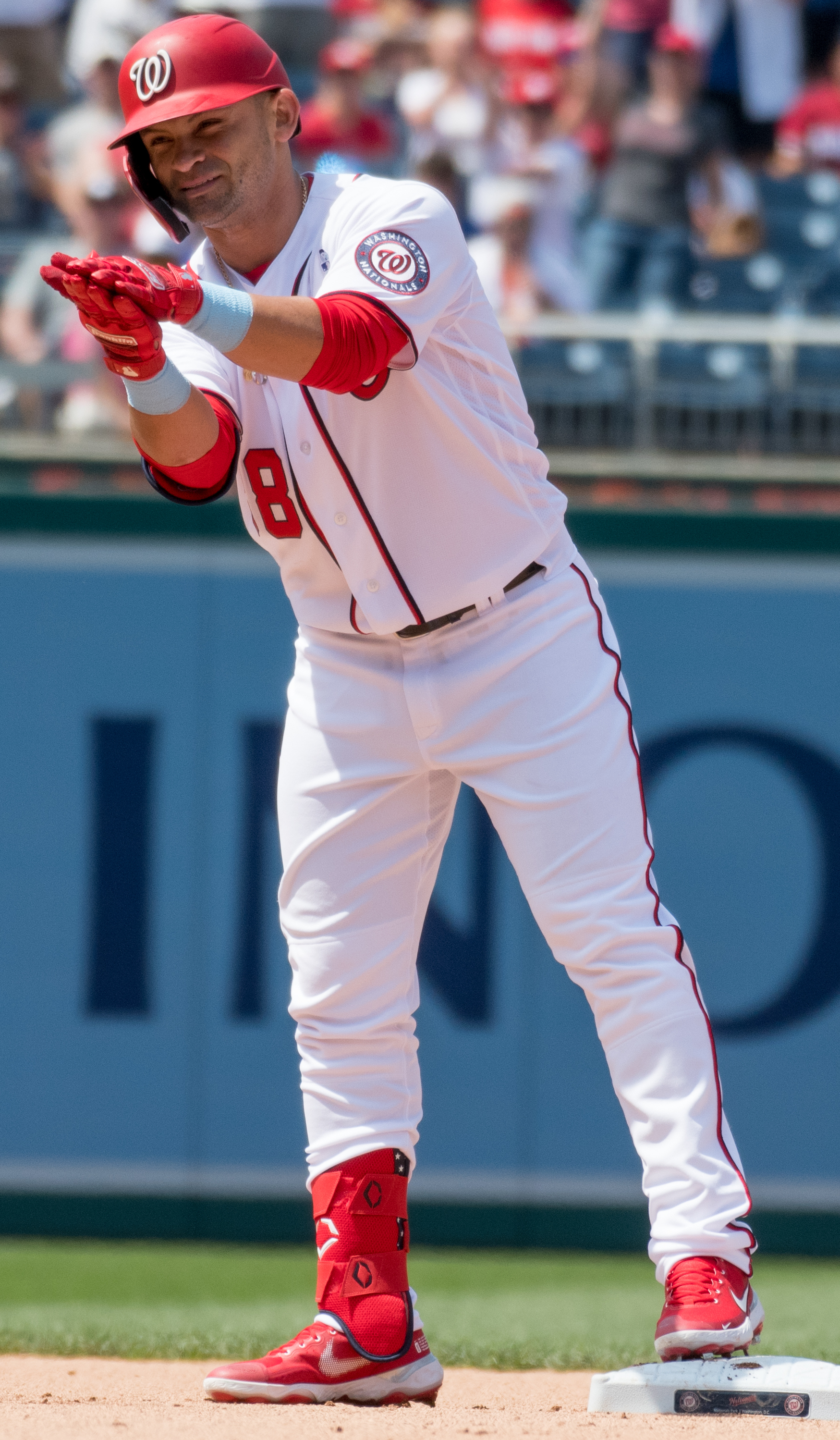
- Parra in 2021
- Outfielder
- Born: May 6, 1987 (age 39); Santa Barbara del Zulia, Venezuela
- Batted: Left Threw: Left

Professional debut
- MLB: May 13, 2009, for the Arizona Diamondbacks
- NPB: June 19, 2020, for the Yomiuri Giants

Last appearance
- NPB: 2020, for the Yomiuri Giants
- MLB: October 3, 2021, for the Washington Nationals

MLB statistics
- Batting average: .275
- Home runs: 90
- Runs batted in: 532

NPB statistics
- Batting average: .267
- Home runs: 4
- Runs batted in: 13
- Stats at Baseball Reference

Teams
- As player: Arizona Diamondbacks (2009–2014); Milwaukee Brewers (2014–2015); Baltimore Orioles (2015); Colorado Rockies (2016–2018); San Francisco Giants (2019); Washington Nationals (2019); Yomiuri Giants (2020); Washington Nationals (2021); As coach: Washington Nationals (2024–2025)

Career highlights and awards
- World Series champion (2019); 2× Gold Glove Award (2011, 2013)

Gerardo Enrique Parra (born May 6, 1987) is a Venezuelan former professional baseball outfielder. He played in Major League Baseball (MLB) for the Arizona Diamondbacks, Milwaukee Brewers, Baltimore Orioles, Colorado Rockies, San Francisco Giants and Washington Nationals, as in Nippon Professional Baseball (NPB) for the Yomiuri Giants. Parra is a two-time Gold Glove Award winner and won the 2019 World Series as a member of the Nationals.

== Playing career ==
=== Minor leagues ===
Parra signed with the Arizona Diamondbacks as a free agent in August 2004. He made his professional debut in 2006 with the Missoula Osprey in the rookie-level Pioneer League and was named a Post-Season All-Star. He spent the majority of the 2007 season with the South Bend Silver Hawks of the Class-A Midwest League. He batted .320 and won the Midwest League batting title.

Parra entered 2008 ranked as the Diamondbacks' third-best prospect according to Baseball America. He split the season between the Visalia Oaks of the Class-A Advanced California League and the Mobile BayBears of the Double-A Southern League. He was chosen to represent Team World at the 2008 Futures Game and collected a single.

=== Arizona Diamondbacks ===
On May 13, 2009, the Diamondbacks promoted Parra to the major leagues from the Double-A Mobile BayBears when left fielder Conor Jackson was placed on the disabled list. He was inserted into the starting lineup the same day, and in his first Major League at bat he became the 100th player in MLB history to hit a home run in his first at bat.

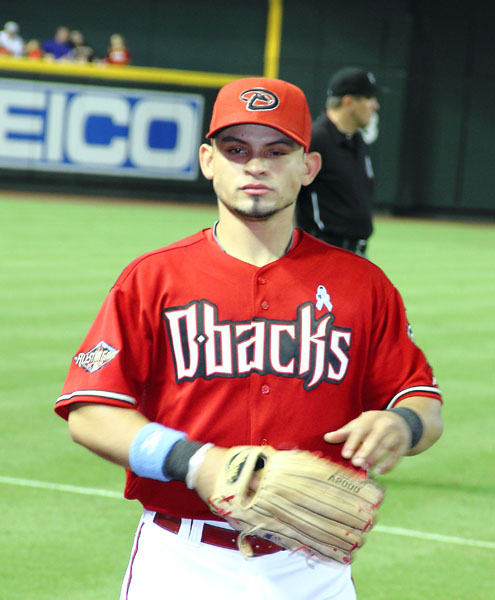
Parra with the Arizona Diamondbacks in 2011

In his first five games he had at least one RBI, becoming the second player since Mike Lansing (1993) in the last 30 years to accomplish this feat. Parra was named NL Rookie of the Month for May and reached base in each of his first 17 games.

In 2011, Parra broke out batting .292 with 8 home runs and 46 runs batted in. Not only did he do well offensively, he also established himself as a threat with his powerful throwing arm, throwing out runners on various occasions. He was a very underrated player in 2011 as he was a key ingredient in leading the Diamondbacks turnaround.

After an outstanding season defensively Parra was awarded the 2011 National League Left Fielder Gold Glove award on November 1, 2011.

In an 18-inning game on August 24–25, 2013 at the Philadelphia Phillies, Parra collected a career-high five hits. The teams drew a combined 28 bases on balls, a National League record. The Diamondbacks' 18 walks tied the National League mark. The game lasted seven hours and six minutes, the longest in franchise history for both clubs. Parra won his second career Gold Glove Award following the 2013 season.

=== Milwaukee Brewers ===
On July 31, 2014, the Diamondbacks traded Parra to the Milwaukee Brewers in exchange for minor leaguers Mitch Haniger and Anthony Banda. Parra hit between Arizona and Milwaukee .261 with 9 home runs and 40 RBIs.

Parra entered the 2015 season as Milwaukee's fourth outfielder.

=== Baltimore Orioles ===
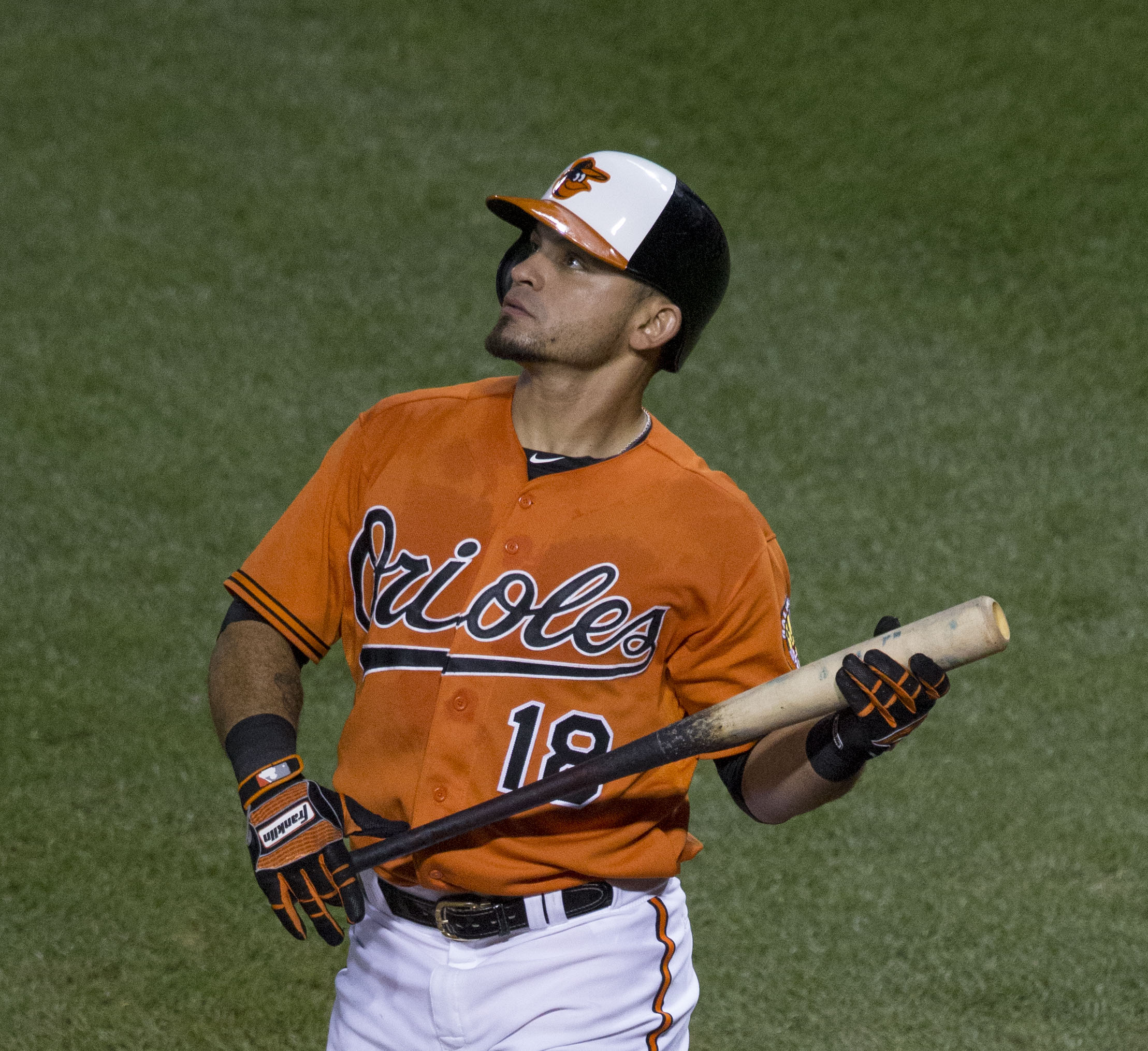
Parra with the Orioles in 2015

On July 31, 2015, the Brewers traded Parra to the Baltimore Orioles for Zach Davies. After a slow start with the Orioles, Parra tied a career-high in hits with five on August 16 in an 18–2 victory over the Oakland Athletics.

=== Colorado Rockies ===
On January 19, 2016, Parra signed a three-year contract with the Colorado Rockies. In his first season as a Rockie, he spent time on the disabled list. He played in 102 games, hitting just .253/.271/.399 with a strikeout to walk ratio of 73/9. He had career highs in average (.309) and RBIs (71) the following season.

On April 13, 2018, Parra was suspended for four games due to his involvement in a brawl that occurred with the Padres two days prior. He ended his three-year contract hitting .284/.342/.372 with 6 home runs and 53 runs batted in.

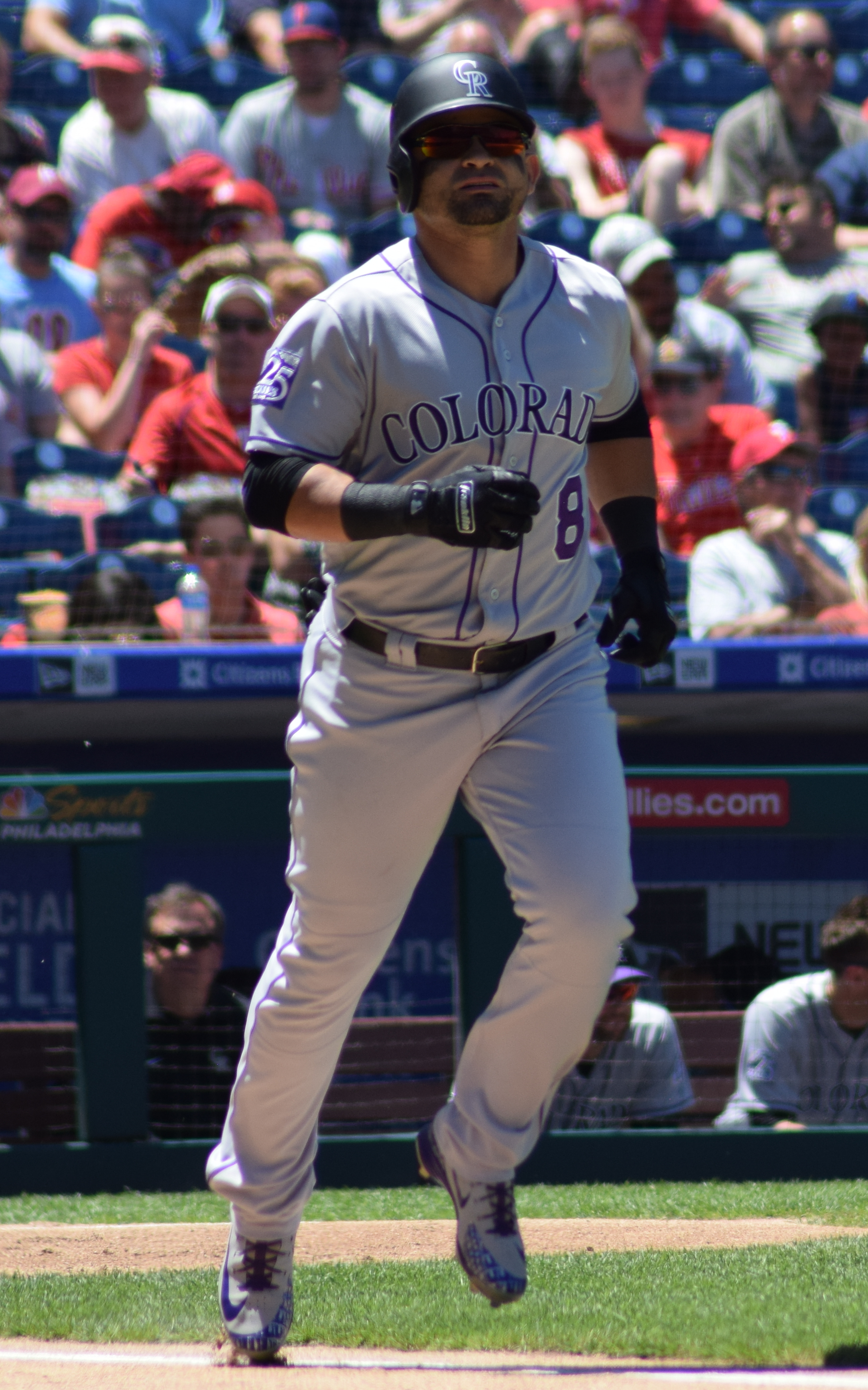
Parra with the Rockies in 2018

On October 30, 2018, the Rockies declined the 2019 option on Parra's contract, instead paying him a $1.5 million buyout and making him a free agent.

=== San Francisco Giants ===
On February 12, 2019, Parra signed a minor league deal with the San Francisco Giants that included an invitation to spring training. In 30 major league games for the Giants, he batted .198/.278/.267. He was designated for assignment on May 3, 2019.

=== Washington Nationals ===
On May 9, 2019, Parra signed a one-year major league contract with the Washington Nationals. His first hit with the team was a go-ahead grand slam in a May 11 game against the Los Angeles Dodgers.

In a game against the Arizona Diamondbacks on August 3, Parra was called upon to pitch in the 8th inning with the Nationals trailing 11–4. He gave up 5 runs on 1 hit and 4 walks before being replaced by another position player, Brian Dozier, and the Nationals eventually lost 18–7. The 25 career pitches thrown by Parra are the most without retiring a batter since at least 2000.

In 2019 with the Nationals he batted .250/.300/.447. Between the Giants and the Nationals combined, in 2019 he batted .234/.293/.391 with nine home runs and 48 RBIs in 274 at bats. During his time with the Nationals, at the suggestion of his children, Parra changed his walk-up music to the popular children's song "Baby Shark". This became a crowd favorite throughout the second half of 2019, as crowds at Nationals Park began to sing along and do the accompanying motions whenever Parra came up to bat. Fans throughout the stadium were seen doing the "shark dance" when Parra was called up to bat in Game 4 of the 2019 National League Championship Series, and then again when Parra was called up to pinch-hit in Games 3, 4, and 5 of the 2019 World Series vs. the Houston Astros. The Nationals won the World Series in 7 games, their first in franchise history.

=== Yomiuri Giants ===
On November 20, 2019, Parra signed a one-year contract with the Yomiuri Giants of Nippon Professional Baseball. In 47 games with Yomiuri, Parra slashed .267/.305/.384 with 4 home runs and 13 RBI.

On December 2, 2020, he became a free agent.

=== Washington Nationals (second stint) ===
On February 3, 2021, Parra signed a minor league deal to return to the Nationals. He was assigned to the Triple-A Rochester Red Wings to begin the season. On June 20, Parra was selected to the active roster.

On March 13, 2022, Parra re-signed with the Nationals on a minor league deal. He was released by the Nationals organization on May 1 without appearing in a major league game.

== Post-playing career ==
Parra retired from professional baseball on May 8, 2022, and took a front office job with the Nationals.

After the 2023 season, the Nationals named Parra their first base coach. In the 2026 season, he became an advisor for player development.

== See also ==
- Arizona Diamondbacks award winners and league leaders
- List of Major League Baseball players with a home run in their first major league at bat
- List of Major League Baseball players from Venezuela
