= David Peralta =

Venezuelan baseball player (born 1987)

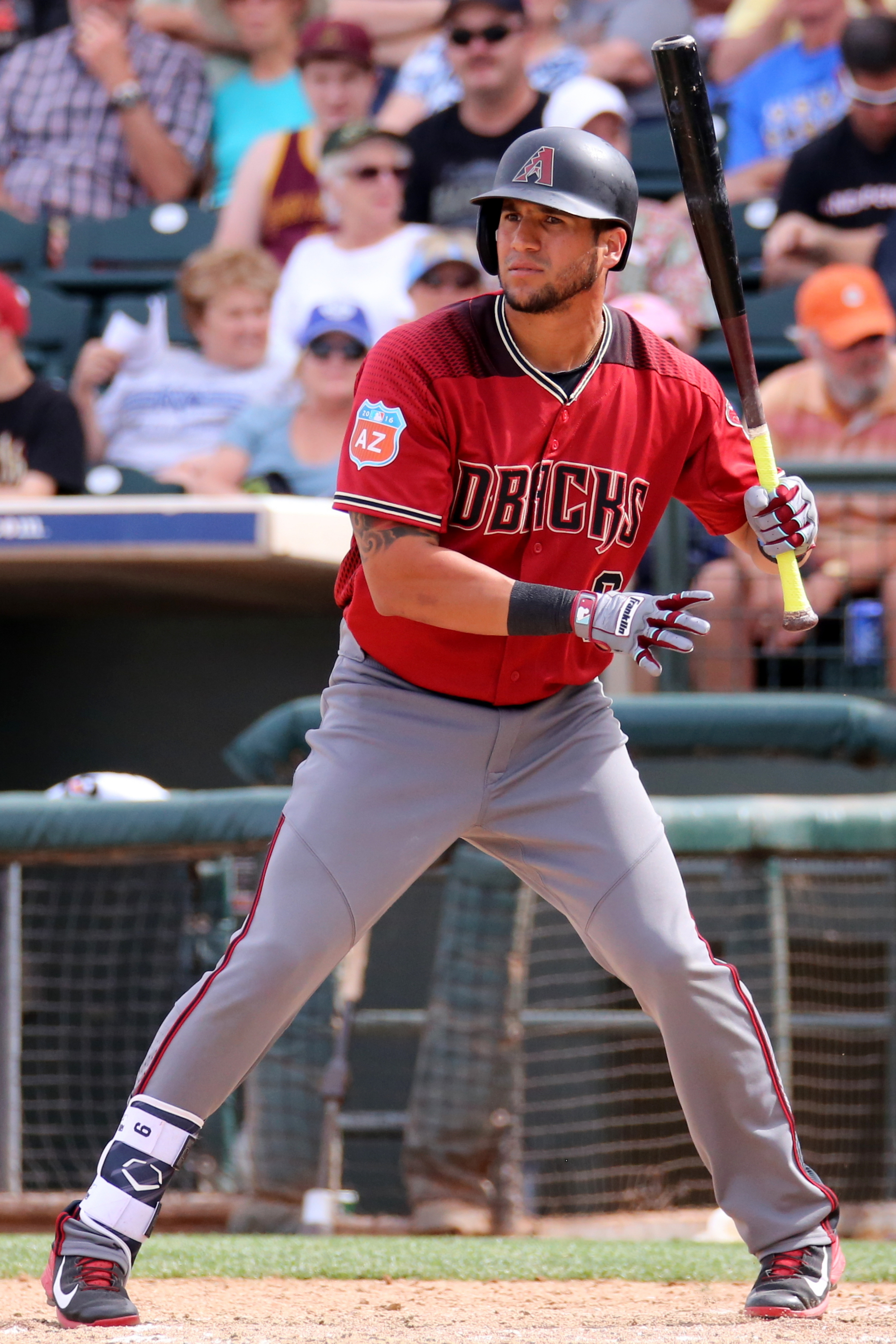
- Peralta with the Arizona Diamondbacks in 2016
- Left fielder
- Born: August 14, 1987 (age 38); Valencia, Carabobo, Venezuela
- Batted: Left Threw: Left

MLB debut
- June 1, 2014, for the Arizona Diamondbacks

Last MLB appearance
- September 29, 2024, for the San Diego Padres

MLB statistics
- Batting average: .278
- Home runs: 125
- Runs batted in: 569
- Stats at Baseball Reference

Teams
- Arizona Diamondbacks (2014–2022); Tampa Bay Rays (2022); Los Angeles Dodgers (2023); San Diego Padres (2024)

Career highlights and awards
- Gold Glove Award (2019); Silver Slugger Award (2018)

Senger David Peralta Guerreiro (born August 14, 1987) is a Venezuelan former professional baseball left fielder. He played in Major League Baseball (MLB) for the Arizona Diamondbacks, Tampa Bay Rays, Los Angeles Dodgers, and San Diego Padres.

Peralta signed with the St. Louis Cardinals organization in 2004 as a pitcher. After getting released and playing in independent baseball leagues, where he became an outfielder, Peralta made his MLB debut in 2014 with the Diamondbacks. He won the Silver Slugger Award in 2018 and the Gold Glove Award in 2019. The Diamondbacks traded Peralta to the Rays during the 2022 season. He played for the Dodgers in 2023 and the Padres in 2024.

== Early life ==
David Peralta was born on August 14, 1987, in Valencia, Venezuela, where he grew up with two sisters, Ivonne and Erika. His father is also named David Peralta, and his mother is Diocelina Peralta.

== Career ==
=== Early career ===
Peralta signed with the St. Louis Cardinals as an international free agent in 2004 for a $35,000 signing bonus. He began his professional career as a pitcher in the Dominican Summer League. He played in the Appalachian League in 2006 and 2007, but required two surgeries on his shoulder and spent the 2008 season rehabilitating. The Cardinals released Peralta in May 2009.

Peralta then played for three seasons as an outfielder in independent baseball for the Rio Grande Valley WhiteWings, Wichita Wingnuts, and Amarillo Sox.

=== Arizona Diamondbacks ===
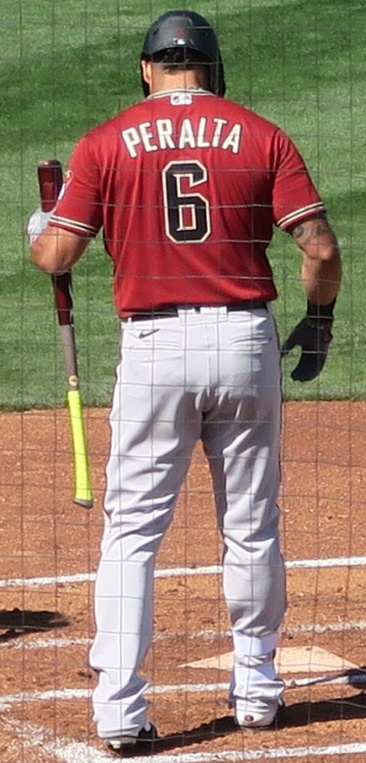
Peralta in 2020

On July 3, 2013, Peralta signed with the Arizona Diamondbacks. They paid $2,500 to buy out his contract with the Amarillo Sox. He played for the Visalia Rawhide of the High–A California League after he signed and began the 2014 season with the Mobile BayBears of the Double–A Southern League.

The Diamondbacks promoted Peralta to the major leagues for the first time on June 1, 2014. He made his major league debut that day. He tied a Diamondbacks record by recording seven multi-hit games in his first 15 games, hitting .328 with one home run and two RBIs. In 2015, Peralta batted .312 with 17 home runs and an NL-leading 10 triples as the Diamondbacks' primary left fielder.

Peralta played in 48 games for the Diamondbacks in 2016, hitting .251/.295/.433 with 4 home runs and 43 hits in 171 at-bats. In 2017 with Arizona, Peralta played in 140 games for the club, batting .293/.352/.444 with 154 hits and 14 home runs in 525 at-bats. In 2018, Peralta hit .293/.352/.516 in 146 games for the Diamondbacks, with a career high 164 hits and a career high 30 home runs. Peralta was awarded the Silver Slugger award at the end of the season. In 2019, Peralta batted .275/.343/.461 in 99 games for Arizona, with 105 hits and 12 home runs. He was awarded the Gold Glove award at the end of the season. Peralta would continue his success offensively in the 2020 season, hitting an even .300 with 5 home runs and finishing second on the team in RBI with 34.

On May 14, 2021, Peralta made his pitching debut, allowing 3 runs in an inning during a blowout loss versus the Washington Nationals. In the appearance, he notched his first major league strikeout, punching out Nationals outfielder Yadiel Hernández. In 2021, Peralta batted .259/.325/.402 with 8 home runs and 63 RBIs. He was tied for the major league lead with eight triples.

=== Tampa Bay Rays ===
On July 30, 2022, Peralta was traded to the Tampa Bay Rays in exchange for Christian Cerda. Peralta singled twice on October 1, against Cristian Javier of the Houston Astros to earn his 1,000th career hit. With Tampa Bay in 2022, he batted .255/.317/.335 with no home runs in 161 at-bats.

=== Los Angeles Dodgers ===
On February 16, 2023, Peralta signed a one-year, $6.5 million contract with the Los Angeles Dodgers. He played in 133 games, and hit .259/.294/.381 with seven home runs and 55 RBI. At the conclusion of the season, Peralta underwent a flexor tendon repair procedure on his left arm to repair an injury he suffered around mid-season. He became a free agent following the season.

=== Chicago Cubs ===
On February 19, 2024, Peralta signed a minor league contract with the Chicago Cubs. In 20 games for the Triple–A Iowa Cubs, he hit .217/.341/.348 with two home runs and eight RBI. On May 10, Peralta opted out of his contract and elected free agency.

=== San Diego Padres ===
On May 18, 2024, Peralta signed a minor league contract with the San Diego Padres. After three games for the Triple–A El Paso Chihuahuas, he had his contract selected to the active roster on May 22. He primarily played right field with Fernando Tatís Jr. injured, and had a slash line of .267/.335/.415, his highest since the shortened 2020 season.

=== Bravos de Margarita ===
After not playing in the summer of 2025, Peralta signed with the Bravos de Margarita of the Venezuelan Professional Baseball League. In 12 games for Margarita, he had 10 hits in 47 at-bats. On February 4, 2026, he announced that he would be retiring from professional baseball.

== Personal life ==
Peralta's wife Jordan gave birth to their first child in August 2017.

== See also ==
- Arizona Diamondbacks award winners and league leaders
- List of Major League Baseball annual triples leaders
- List of Major League Baseball career games played as a left fielder leaders
- List of Major League Baseball players from Venezuela
