= Max Rubner Institute =

Federal agency in Germany

The Max Rubner Institute (MRI), Federal Research Institute of Nutrition and Food is a higher federal authority of the Federal Republic of Germany in the portfolio of the Federal Ministry of Food and Agriculture (BMEL). The research focus is on consumer health protection in the nutrition sector. In this field, the MRI advises the BMEL.

The institute was named after the physician and physiologist Max Rubner. Until January 1, 2008, the institute was called the Federal Research Institute of Nutrition and Food (BfEL). The president of the MRI is Tanja Schwerdtle.

The institution's headquarters are in Karlsruhe. Other locations are Kiel, Detmold and Kulmbach. The Münster site has been closed; "the fish quality department is currently still located in Hamburg." In total, the institute employs around 200 scientists at its various sites.

The MRI is a member of the Working Group of Departmental Research Institutions.

== History ==
The MRI's predecessor, the Federal Research Institute of Nutrition and Food, was established on January 1, 2004, through the merger of the following institutions:

- Federal Institute for Cereal, Potato and Fat Research in Detmold and Münster.
- Federal Dairy Research Station in Kiel
- Federal Research Station for Nutrition in Karlsruhe
- Federal Institute for Meat Research in Kulmbach
- Fish Quality Branch of the Institute for Fishery Technology and Fish Quality of the Federal Research Institute for Fisheries in Hamburg-Altona, Palmaille 9.
