= Magnetic Resonance Imaging (journal) =

- Discipline: Radiology and medical imaging
- Language: English
- Edited by: John C. Gore

Publication details
- History: 1982–present
- Publisher: Elsevier
- Frequency: 10/year
- Impact factor: 2.546 (2020)

Standard abbreviations
- ISO 4: Magn. Reson. Imaging

Indexing
- ISSN: 0730-725X
- OCLC no.: 177674307

Links
- Journal homepage

Magnetic Resonance Imaging is a peer-reviewed scientific journal published by Elsevier, encompassing biology, physics, and clinical science as they relate to the development and use of magnetic resonance imaging technology. Magnetic Resonance Imaging was established in 1982 and the current editor-in-chief is John C. Gore. The journal produces 10 issues per year.
