= 2003 Montreal Expos season =

2003 Montreal Expos
- League: National League
- Division: East
- Ballpark: Olympic Stadium (59 games) and Estadio Hiram Bithorn (22 games)
- City: Montreal, Canada and San Juan, Puerto Rico
- Record: 83–79 (.512)
- Divisional place: 4th
- Owners: Major League Baseball
- General managers: Omar Minaya
- Managers: Frank Robinson
- Television: Réseau des sports (Rodger Brulotte, Denis Casavant)
- Radio: CKGM (AM) (Mitch Melnick, Elliott Price, guest minor league play-by-play broadcasters) CKAC (AM) (Jacques Doucet, Marc Griffin)

The 2003 Montreal Expos season was the 35th Major League Baseball (MLB) season for the Montreal Expos, and the team's penultimate season in Canada. The team competed as members of the National League East. The Expos played most of their home games at Olympic Stadium in Montreal, while also playing 22 home games at Estadio Hiram Bithorn in San Juan, Puerto Rico.

On August 28, 2003, the Expos were tied atop the Wild Card race of the National League, with several other teams all having a .526 winning percentage. However, the team faded during the stretch and failed to make the postseason, finishing 18 games behind the Atlanta Braves in the National League East and 8 games behind the Florida Marlins in the Wild Card race. The Expos' season record of 83–79 (.512) was identical to the one they finished with the previous season. This was the Expos' last winning season in Montreal, and their last overall as a franchise until 2012. When rosters expanded on September 1, MLB refused to allow the league-owned team to add any players.

== Spring training ==
After holding spring training at Roger Dean Stadium in Jupiter, Florida, from 1998 through 2002, the Expos moved to Space Coast Stadium in Viera, Florida, for spring training in 2003. The move to Viera came about as the result of a deal in which Major League Baseball bought the Expos from Jeffrey Loria, who then purchased the Florida Marlins; as part of the deal, the Marlins traded spring training sites with the Expos, moving from Viera to Jupiter. The franchise, as the Expos in 2003 and 2004 and then from 2005 as the Washington Nationals, would hold spring training at Space Coast Stadium through 2016.

== Regular season ==
- June 24, 2003 – Brad Wilkerson hit for the cycle in a game against the Pittsburgh Pirates.
- June 28, 2003 - Texas Rangers outfielder Juan Gonzalez rejected a trade to the Expos, exercising the no-trade clause in his contract after the teams agreed to a deal.
- August 26, 2003 – The Expos rallied from being down 8-0 and 10–3 to claim a 14–10 win against the Philadelphia Phillies and be within two games of the National League Wild Card. It was the second biggest comeback in Expos history.
- September 14, 2003 – Vladimir Guerrero hits for the cycle against the New York Mets.

On August 30, 2002, MLB signed a collective bargaining agreement with the players association, which prohibited contraction through the end of the agreement in 2006.

Ultimately, the Expos finished 8 games behind the Wild Card (and World Series Champion) Florida Marlins.

=== Puerto Rico ===
Although their attendance increased from 7,935 per game in 2001 to 10,031 in 2002, MLB decided that the Expos would play 22 of their home games at Hiram Bithorn Stadium in San Juan, Puerto Rico in 2003. Despite being a considerably smaller facility (seating approximately 19,000) than Montreal's Olympic Stadium, attendance in San Juan's Hiram Bithorn Stadium averaged 14,222, compared with 12,081 in Montreal. The Puerto Rican baseball fans embraced "Los Expos" (particularly Puerto Rican players José Vidro, Javier Vázquez and Wil Cordero, and other Latin players like Vladimir Guerrero and Liván Hernández) as their home team (as well as the Latin players from other teams), all the while hoping the team would make a permanent move to Puerto Rico. Thanks in part to the San Juan games, the Expos were able to draw over a million fans at home in 2003 for the first time since 1997. The Expos' season in Puerto Rico was chronicled in the MLB-produced DVD Boricua Beisbol – Passion of Puerto Rico.

=== Opening Day lineup ===
Opening Day Starters
Name	Position
Endy Chávez	Center fielder
José Vidro	Second baseman
Ron Calloway	Right fielder
Wil Cordero	First baseman
Brad Wilkerson	Left fielder
Orlando Cabrera	Shortstop
Fernando Tatís	Third baseman
Michael Barrett	Catcher
Tony Armas Jr.	Starting pitcher

=== Season standings ===
==== National League East ====
NL East
Team	W	L	Pct.	GB	Home	Road
Atlanta Braves	101	61	.623	—	55‍–‍26	46‍–‍35
Florida Marlins	91	71	.562	10	53‍–‍28	38‍–‍43
Philadelphia Phillies	86	76	.531	15	49‍–‍32	37‍–‍44
Montreal Expos	83	79	.512	18	52‍–‍29	31‍–‍50
New York Mets	66	95	.410	34½	34‍–‍46	32‍–‍49

==== Record vs. opponents ====
2003 National League record Source: MLB Standings Grid – 2003
Team	AZ	ATL	CHC	CIN	COL	FLA	HOU	LAD	MIL	MON	NYM	PHI	PIT	SD	SF	STL	AL
Arizona	—	2–5	2–4	7–2	10–9	2–5	5–1	10–9	3–3	4–2	4–2	4–2	3–3	9–10	5–14	3–3	11–4
Atlanta	5–2	—	4–2	3–3	6–0	9–10	5–1	4–2	4–2	12–7	11–8	9–10	7–2	6–1	2–4	4–2	10–5
Chicago	4–2	2–4	—	10–7	3–3	4–2	9–7	2–4	10–6	3–3	5–1	1–5	10–8	4–2	4–2	8–9	9–9
Cincinnati	2–7	3–3	7–10	—	4–2	2–4	5–12	2–4	8–10	2–4	2–4	5–4	5–11	3–3	3–3	9–7	7–5
Colorado	9–10	0–6	3–3	2–4	—	4–2	2–4	7–12	5–1	3–4	2–5	2–4	3–6	12–7	7–12	4–2	9–6
Florida	5–2	10–9	2–4	4–2	2–4	—	1–5	2–5	7–2	13–6	12–7	13–6	2–4	5–1	1–5	3–3	9–6
Houston	1–5	1–5	7–9	12–5	4–2	5–1	—	4–2	9–8	3–3	2–4	2–4	10–6	3–3	2–4	11–7	11–7
Los Angeles	9–10	2–4	4–2	4–2	12–7	5–2	2–4	—	4–2	4–2	3–3	2–5	5–1	8–11	6–13	4–2	11–7
Milwaukee	3–3	2–4	6–10	10–8	1–5	2–7	8–9	2–4	—	0–6	6–3	4–2	10–7	5–1	1–5	3–13	5–7
Montreal	2–4	7–12	3–3	4–2	4–3	6–13	3–3	2–4	6–0	—	14–5	8–11	3–3	4–2	7–0	1–5	9–9
New York	2–4	8–11	1–5	4–2	5–2	7–12	4–2	3–3	3–6	5–14	—	7–12	4–2	3–3	4–2	1–5	5–10
Philadelphia	2–4	10–9	5–1	4–5	4–2	6–13	4–2	5–2	2–4	11–8	12–7	—	2–4	4–3	3–3	4–2	8–7
Pittsburgh	3–3	2–7	8–10	11–5	6–3	4–2	6–10	1–5	7–10	3–3	2–4	4–2	—	4–2	2–4	7–10	5–7
San Diego	10–9	1–6	2–4	3–3	7–12	1–5	3–3	11–8	1–5	2–4	3–3	3–4	2–4	—	5–14	2–4	8–10
San Francisco	14–5	4–2	2–4	3–3	12–7	5–1	4–2	13–6	5–1	0–7	2–4	3–3	4–2	14–5	—	5–1	10–8
St. Louis	3–3	2–4	9–8	7–9	2–4	3–3	7–11	2–4	13–3	5–1	5–1	2–4	10–7	4–2	1–5	—	10–8

Expos vs. American League
Team	AL West				
Team	ANA	OAK	SEA	TEX	TOR
**Montreal**	1–2	0–3	2–1	3–0	3–3

=== Notable transactions ===
- August 20, 2003: The Expos signed Todd Zeile as a free agent.

=== Roster ===
2003 Montreal Expos
**Roster**
**Pitchers**: 59 Héctor Almonte; 36 Tony Armas Jr.; 56 Luis Ayala; 60 Rocky Biddle; 53 Roy Corcoran; 62 Chad Cordero; 45 Vic Darensbourg; 54 Zach Day; 37 Scott Downs; 47 Tim Drew; 58 Joey Eischen; 32 Anthony Ferrari; 59 Bryan Hebson; 61 Liván Hernández; 31 Sun Woo Kim; 41 Eric Knott; 44 Julio Mañón; 50 José Mercedes; 24 Tomo Ohka; 34 Britt Reames; 43 Dan Smith; 51 Scott Stewart; 52 T. J. Tucker; 33 Claudio Vargas; 23 Javier Vázquez	**Catchers**: 5 Michael Barrett; 39 Brian Schneider; **Infielders**: 18 Orlando Cabrera; 2 Jamey Carroll; 12 Wil Cordero; 35 Edwards Guzman; 45 Jeff Liefer; 21 Fernando Tatís; 3 José Vidro; 7 Todd Zeile	**Outfielders**: 53,22 Ron Calloway; 29 Matt Cepicky; 19 Endy Chávez; 27 Vladimir Guerrero; 1 José Macías; 32 Joe Vitiello; 6 Brad Wilkerson; **Other batters**: 4 Henry Mateo	**Manager**: 20 Frank Robinson; **Coaches**: 14 Manny Acta (Third base); 17 Tommy McCraw (Hitting); 9 Brad Mills (Bench); 29 Jerry Morales (First base); 13 Bob Natal (Bullpen); 16 Claude Raymond (Roving); 46 Randy St. Claire (Pitching)

=== Game log ===
Legend
	Expos win
	Expos loss
	Postponement
**Bold**	Expos team member

2003 game log
March (1–0)

#	Date	Opponent	Score	Win	Loss	Save	Attendance	Stadium	Record
1	March 31	@ Braves	10–2	**Armas** (1–0)	Maddux (0–1)		40,258	Turner Field	1–0

April (16–10)

#	Date	Opponent	Score	Win	Loss	Save	Attendance	Stadium	Record
2	April 2	@ Braves	3–0	**Day** (1–0)	Ramírez (0–1)	**Biddle** (1)	19,116	Turner Field	2–0
3	April 3	@ Braves	4–0	**Vázquez** (1–0)	Ortiz (0–1)		19,505	Turner Field	3–0
4	April 4	@ Mets	0–4	Cone (1–0)	**Ohka** (0–1)		18,040	Shea Stadium	3–1
5	April 5	@ Mets	1-3	Glavine (1-1)	**Armas** (1–1)	Benítez (2)	36,817	Shea Stadium	3–2
6	April 6	@ Mets	8–5	**Stewart** (1–0)	Benítez (0–1)	**Biddle** (2)	35,093	Shea Stadium	4–2
–	April 7	@ Cubs	Postponed (snow) Rescheduled for April 8						
7	April 8	@ Cubs	1–6	Clement (1-1)	**Day** (1-1)		29,138	Wrigley Field	4–3
8	April 9	@ Cubs	0–3	Prior (2–0)	**Vázquez** (1–1)		29,966	Wrigley Field	4–4
9	April 10	@ Cubs	7–1	**Armas** (2–1)	Estes (0–1)		30,225	Wrigley Field	5–4
10	April 11	vs. Mets @ San Juan, PR (Note: Games the Montreal Expos played at Hiram Bithorn Stadium in San Juan, Puerto Rico, during the 2003 season counted as Expos home games.)	10–0	**Ohka** (1-1)	Cone (1-1)		17,906	Hiram Bithorn Stadium	6–4
11	April 12	vs. Mets @ San Juan, PR	5–4	**Hernández** (1–0)	Seo (0–1)	**Biddle** (3)	18,264	Hiram Bithorn Stadium	7–4
12	April 13	vs. Mets @ San Juan, PR	2–1 (10)	**Biddle** (1–0)	Stanton (0–2)		16,332	Hiram Bithorn Stadium	8–4
13	April 14	vs. Mets @ San Juan, PR	5–3	**Smith** (1–0)	Strickland (0–1)	**Biddle** (4)	13,155	Hiram Bithorn Stadium	9–4
14	April 15	vs. Braves @ San Juan, PR	1–2 (10)	Bong (1–0)	**Smith** (1-1)	Smoltz (4)	13,339	Hiram Bithorn Stadium	9–5
15	April 16	vs. Braves @ San Juan, PR	2–3	Ramírez (1–2)	**Okha** (1–2)	Smoltz (5)	15,571	Hiram Bithorn Stadium	9–6
16	April 17	vs. Braves @ San Juan, PR	8–14 (10)	Bong (2–0)	**Biddle** (1–1)		13,170	Hiram Bithorn Stadium	9–7
–	April 18	vs. Reds @ San Juan, PR	Postponed (rain) Rescheduled for April 19 as part of a doubleheader						
17	April 19 (1)	vs. Reds @ San Juan, PR	8–7 (10)	**Ayala** (1–0)	Williamson (2–1)		10,296	Hiram Bithorn Stadium	10–7
18	April 19 (2)	vs. Reds @ San Juan, PR	9–5	**Vázquez** (2–1)	Anderson (1–2)		13,109	Hiram Bithorn Stadium	11–7
19	April 20	vs. Reds @ San Juan, PR	5–7	Sullivan (1–0)	**Ayala** (1–2)	Williamson (3)	11,619	Hiram Bithorn Stadium	11–8
20	April 22	Diamondbacks	4–0	**Ohka** (2-2)	Good (1-1)		36,879	Olympic Stadium	12–8
21	April 23	Diamondbacks	2–6	Dessens (2-2)	**Hernández** (1-1)		6,380	Olympic Stadium	12–9
22	April 24	Diamondbacks	1–0	**Vázquez** (3–1)	Kim (1–4)	**Biddle** (5)	5,954	Olympic Stadium	13–9
23	April 25	Astros	10–2	**Day** (2–1)	Robertson (1–3)		6,863	Olympic Stadium	14–9
24	April 26	Astros	3–2 (10)	**Biddle** (2–1)	Wagner (1–1)		8,492	Olympic Stadium	15–9
25	April 27	Astros	3–6	Redding (2–2)	**Ohka** (2–3)	Dotel (7)	52,900	Olympic Stadium	15–10
26	April 29	@ Brewers	3–2	**Stewart** (2–0)	DeJean (0–2)	**Biddle** (6)	10,044	Miller Park	16–10
27	April 30	@ Brewers	10–4	**Hernández** (2–1)	Sheets (2–3)		10,945	Miller Park	17–10

May (16–12)

#	Date	Opponent	Score	Win	Loss	Save	Attendance	Stadium	Record
28	May 1	@ Brewers	5–0	**Day** (3–1)	Franklin (1–3)		13,180	Miller Park	18–10
29	May 2	@ Cardinals	1–8	Simontacchi (1–1)	**Ohka** (2–4)		41,810	Busch Memorial Stadium	18–11
30	May 3	@ Cardinals	1–3	Stephenson (2–2)	**Vargas** (0–1)	Calero (1)	36,176	Busch Memorial Stadium	18–12
31	May 4	@ Cardinals	2–6	Morris (3–2)	**Vázquez** (3–2)		39,605	Busch Memorial Stadium	18–13
32	May 6	Padres	4–2	**Hernández** (3–1)	Peavy (4–3)	**Biddle** (7)	5,841	Olympic Stadium	19–13
33	May 7	Padres	12-9 (10)	**Biddle** (3–1)	Orosco (0–1)		5,111	Olympic Stadium	20–13
34	May 8	Padres	12-5	**Ohka** (3–4)	Lawrence (2–4)		5,274	Olympic Stadium	21–13
35	May 9	Dodgers	5-9	Mota (2–1)	**Stewart** (2–1)		10,675	Olympic Stadium	21–14
36	May 10	Dodgers	6-5	**Ayala** (2–1)	Martin (0–1)	**Biddle** (8)	8,084	Olympic Stadium	22–14
37	May 11	Dodgers	4-3	Pérez (2-2)	**Hernández** (3–2)	Gagné (12)	14,488	Olympic Stadium	22–15
38	May 12	@ Giants	4-3	**Day** (4–1)	Moss (5–1)	**Biddle** (9)	33,071	Pacific Bell Park	23–15
39	May 13	@ Giants	6-4	**Smith** (2–1)	Ainsworth (3-3)	**Biddle** (10)	32,991	Pacific Bell Park	24–15
40	May 14	@ Giants	6-3	**Vargas** (1-1)	Foppert (2–3)		38,963	Pacific Bell Park	25–15
41	May 15	@ Rockies	2-4	Jones (2–0)	**Tucker** (0–1)	Jiménez (11)	23,197	Coors Field	25–16
42	May 16	@ Rockies	4-1	**Ayala** (3–1)	Cruz (3–4)	**Biddle** (11)	27,117	Coors Field	26–16
43	May 17	@ Rockies	6-4 (10)	**Ayala** (4–1)	Jones (1–2)		30,052	Coors Field	27–16
44	May 18	@ Rockies	0-4	Chacón (5–2)	**Ohka** (3–5)		30,720	Coors Field	27–17
45	May 20	Marlins	6-4	**Vázquez** (4–2)	Willis (1-1)	**Biddle** (13)	5,435	Olympic Stadium	28–17
46	May 21	Marlins	7-2	**Vargas** (2–1)	Pavano (3–5)		5,282	Olympic Stadium	29–17
47	May 22	Marlins	8–2	**Hernández** (4–2)	Tejera (0–3)		6,249	Olympic Stadium	30–17
48	May 23	Phillies	2–4	Millwood (7–1)	**Day** (4–2)	Mesa (13)	9,511	Olympic Stadium	30–18
49	May 24	Phillies	3–2	**Ayala** (5–1)	Silva (3–1)		33,236	Olympic Stadium	31–18
50	May 25	Phillies	5–3	**Vázquez** (5–2)	Myers (4–4)	**Biddle** (14)	17,023	Olympic Stadium	32–18
51	May 26	@ Marlins	1–5	Pavano (4–5)	**Vargas** (2–2)		8,362	Pro Player Stadium	32–19
–	May 27	@ Marlins	Postponed (rain) Rescheduled for May 28 as part of a doubleheader						
52	May 28 (1)	@ Marlins	3–4	Phelps (2–0)	**Hernández** (4–3)	Looper (8)	(Note: The two games on May 10 were played as a single-admission doubleheader with attendance counted only for the two games combined.)	Pro Player Stadium	32–20
53	May 28 (2)	@ Marlins	0–6	Tejera (1–3)	**Day** (4–3)		9,169	Pro Player Stadium	32–21
54	May 29	@ Marlins	3–2	**Ohka** (4–5)	Almanza (3–3)	**Biddle** (15)	9,052	Pro Player Stadium	33–21
55	May 30	@ Phillies	5–12	Cormier (2–0)	**Vázquez** (5–3)		18,311	Veterans Stadium	33–22
–	May 31	@ Phillies	Postponed (rain) Rescheduled for June 1 as part of a doubleheader						

June (12–15)

#	Date	Opponent	Score	Win	Loss	Save	Attendance	Record	
56	June 1 (1)	@ Phillies	3–4	Wolf (6–3)	**Hernández** (4–4)	Mesa (14)	(Note: The two games on June 1 were played as a single-admission doubleheader with attendance counted only for the two games combined.)	Veterans Stadium	33–23
57	June 1 (2)	@ Phillies	1–4	Myers (5–4)	**Smith** (2–2)	Mesa (15)	36,685	Veterans Stadium	33–24
58	June 3	vs. Angels @ San Juan, PR	4–15	Ortiz (5–5)	**Ohka** (4–6)		10,034	Hiram Bithorn Stadium	33–25
59	June 4	vs. Angels @ San Juan, PR	2–11	Washburn (6–5)	**Kim** (0–1)		10,501	Hiram Bithorn Stadium	33–26
60	June 5	vs. Angels @ San Juan, PR	8–7 (14)	**Eischen** (5–2)	Callaway (1–4)		10,598	Hiram Bithorn Stadium	34–26
61	June 6	vs. Rangers @ San Juan, PR	13–10	**Hernández** (5–4)	Lewis (4–4)		18,005	Hiram Bithorn Stadium	35–26
62	June 7	vs. Rangers @ San Juan, PR	5–4	**Vargas** (3–2)	Shouse (0–1)	**Ayala** (1)	18,003	Hiram Bithorn Stadium	36–26
63	June 8	vs. Rangers @ San Juan, PR	3–2	**Stewart** (3–1)	Cordero (2–6)	**Biddle** (16)	18,001	Hiram Bithorn Stadium	37–26
64	June 10	@ Mariners	7–3	**Vázquez** (6–3)	Meche (8–3)	**Ayala** (2)	34,811	Safeco Field	38–26
65	June 11	@ Mariners	3–1	**Hernández** (6–4)	Piñeiro (5–5)	**Biddle** (17)	32,853	Safeco Field	39–26
66	June 12	@ Mariners	0–1	Franklin (5–4)	**Vargas** (3–3)	Rhodes (1)	33,761	Safeco Field	39–27
67	June 13	@ Athletics	4–8	Mulder (9–4)	**Ohka** (4–7)		14,186	Network Associates Coliseum	39–28
68	June 14	@ Athletics	4–5	Rincón (3–3)	**Ayala** (5–2)	Foulke (16)	26,447	Network Associates Coliseum	39–29
69	June 15	@ Athletics	1–9	Hudson (5–2)	**Vázquez** (6–4)		31,024	Network Associates Coliseum	39–30
–	June 17	@ Pirates	Postponed (rain) Rescheduled for June 18 as part of a doubleheader						
70	June 18 (1)	@ Pirates	3–7	D'Amico (5–7)	**Hernández** (6–5)	Williams (19)	(Note: The two games on June 18 were played as a single-admission doubleheader with attendance counted only for the two games combined.)	PNC Park	39–31
71	June 18 (2)	@ Pirates	3–4	Torres (4–1)	**Biddle** (3–2)		22,557	PNC Park	39–32
72	June 19	@ Pirates	5–2	**Ohka** (5–7)	Torres (4–2)		16,050	PNC Park	40–32
73	June 20	Blue Jays	4–8	Lidle (10–4)	**Vázquez** (6–5)		11,355	Olympic Stadium	40–33
74	June 21	Blue Jays	8–5	**Ayala** (6–2)	Politte (1–5)	**Biddle** (19)	11,483	Olympic Stadium	41–33
75	June 22	Blue Jays	2–4	Halladay (11–2)	**Hernández** (6–6)	Politte (11)	15,508	Olympic Stadium	41–34
76	June 23	Pirates	3–0	**Vargas** (4–3)	Suppan (5–7)	**Biddle** (20)	5,641	Olympic Stadium	42–34
77	June 24	Pirates	6–4	**Ohka** (6–7)	D'Amico (5–8)	**Biddle** (21)	5,872	Olympic Stadium	43–34
78	June 25	Pirates	5–6	Sauerbeck (3–4)	**Eischen** (1–1)	Williams (20)	5,717	Olympic Stadium	43–35
79	June 27	@ Blue Jays	5–6	Miller (1–1)	**Mañón** (0–1)		24,024	SkyDome	43–36
80	June 28	@ Blue Jays	4–2	**Vargas** (5–3)	Davis (4–5)	**Biddle** (22)	33,334	SkyDome	44–36
81	June 29	@ Blue Jays	10–2	**Ohka** (7–7)	Escobar (5–5)		37,354	SkyDome	45–36
82	June 30	@ Mets	1–3	Trachsel (7–5)	**Vázquez** (6–6)	Benítez (19)	29,829	Shea Stadium	45–37

July (10–17)

#	Date	Opponent	Score	Win	Loss	Save	Attendance	Stadium	Record
83	July 1	@ Mets	6–7	Benítez (2–3)	**Mañón** (0–2)		30,084	Shea Stadium	45–38
84	July 2	@ Mets	11–4	**Hernández** (7–6)	Seo (5–4)		35,547	Shea Stadium	46–38
85	July 3	@ Braves	5–4	**Vargas** (6–3)	Reynolds (5–4)	**Mañón** (1)	31,607	Turner Field	47–38
86	July 4	@ Braves	6–8	Ortiz (11–4)	**Ohka** (7–8)	Smoltz (31)	48,923	Turner Field	47–39
87	July 5	@ Braves	2–3	Bong (1–3)	**Biddle** (3–3)		34,454	Turner Field	47–40
88	July 6	@ Braves	5–7	Hampton (4–5)	**Drew** (0–1)	Smoltz (32)	27,724	Turner Field	47–41
89	July 7	Phillies	8–1	**Hernández** (8–6)	Duckworth (3–3)		7,099	Olympic Stadium	48–41
90	July 8	Phillies	6–13	Myers (9–6)	**Vargas** (6–4)		8,225	Olympic Stadium	48–42
91	July 9	Phillies	0–2	Millwood (10–6)	**Ohka** (7–9)		7,005	Olympic Stadium	48–43
92	July 11	Marlins	4–5	Penny (8–6)	**Biddle** (3–4)	Looper (17)	7,251	Olympic Stadium	48–44
93	July 12	Marlins	7–1	**Hernández** (9–6)	Redman (7–4)		28,170	Olympic Stadium	49–44
94	July 13	Marlins	4–11	Willis (9–1)	**Vargas** (6–5)		16,084	Olympic Stadium	49–45
**All–Star Break (July 14–16)**
95	July 17	@ Phillies	2–5 (11)	Plesac (2–0)	**Drew** (0–2)		23,874	Veterans Stadium	49–46
96	July 18	@ Phillies	3–1	**Vázquez** (7–6)	Wolf (10–5)		22,789	Veterans Stadium	50–46
97	July 19	@ Phillies	3–4 (11)	Mesa (5–5)	**Almonte** (0–2)		28,794	Veterans Stadium	50–47
98	July 20	@ Phillies	2–3	Myers (10–6)	**Vargas** (6–6)	Mesa (19)	37,552	Veterans Stadium	50–48
99	July 21	@ Marlins	1–4	Beckett (4–4)	**Knott** (0–1)		10,769	Pro Player Stadium	50–49
100	July 22	@ Marlins	1–9	Pavano (7–10)	**Ohka** (7–10)		10,512	Pro Player Stadium	50-50
101	July 23	Mets	5–2	**Vázquez** (8–6)	Seo (5–7)	**Biddle** (23)	8,853	Olympic Stadium	51–50
102	July 24	Mets	5–1	**Hernández** (10–6)	Glavine (6–11)	**Biddle** (24)	9,337	Olympic Stadium	52–50
103	July 25	Braves	9–8 (11)	**Ayala** (7–2)	Bong (6–2)		10,069	Olympic Stadium	53–50
104	July 26	Braves	4–15	Reynolds (8–5)	**Day** (4–4)		14,132	Olympic Stadium	53–51
105	July 27	Braves	13–10	**Mañón** (1–2)	King (3–1)	**Biddle** (25)	16,074	Olympic Stadium	54–51
106	July 28	Braves	8–10	Hampton (7–5)	**Vázquez** (8–7)	Smoltz (38)	9,750	Olympic Stadium	54–52
107	July 29	Cardinals	1–2	Stephenson (5–10)	**Hernández** (10–7)		7,418	Olympic Stadium	54–53
108	July 30	Cardinals	1–11	Haren (2–2)	**Vargas** (6–7)		6,129	Olympic Stadium	54-54
109	July 31	Cardinals	3–2	**Day** (5–4)	Williams (14–4)	**Biddle** (26)	9,145	Olympic Stadium	55–54

August (16–13)

#	Date	Opponent	Score	Win	Loss	Save	Attendance	Stadium	Record
110	August 1	Brewers	8–4	**Ohka** (8–10)	Franklin (7–8)		6,518	Olympic Stadium	56–54
111	August 2	Brewers	7–1	**Vázquez** (9–7)	Manning (0–1)		22,180	Olympic Stadium	57–54
112	August 3	Brewers	4–2	**Hernández** (11–7)	Sheets (10–8)	**Biddle** (27)	17,953	Olympic Stadium	58–54
113	August 5	@ Diamondbacks	5–8	Johnson (2–4)	**Vargas** (6–8)	Mantei (13)	37,959	Bank One Ballpark	58–55
114	August 6	@ Diamondbacks	2–3	Oropesa (3–2)	**Ayala** (7–3)	Mantei (14)	28,328	Bank One Ballpark	58–56
115	August 7	@ Diamondbacks	4–5 (10)	Valverde (2–0)	**Knott** (0–2)		28,852	Bank One Ballpark	58–57
116	August 8	@ Astros	1–5	Miceli (5–6)	**Vázquez** (9–8)		30,037	Minute Maid Park	58-58
117	August 9	@ Astros	3–1	**Hernández** (12–7)	Fernández (1–1)		35,295	Minute Maid Park	59–58
118	August 10	@ Astros	2–8	Villone (4–2)	**Downs** (0–1)		32,340	Minute Maid Park	59-59
119	August 11	Rockies	3–1	**Day** (6–4)	Jennings (10–10)	**Biddle** (28)	6,401	Olympic Stadium	60–59
120	August 12	Rockies	3–6 (11)	Fuentes (3–1)	**Biddle** (3–5)	López (1)	7,277	Olympic Stadium	60-60
121	August 13	Rockies	6–5	**Vázquez** (10–8)	Stark (1–1)	**Ayala** (3)	6,724	Olympic Stadium	61–60
122	August 15	Giants	4–1	**Hernández** (13–7)	Foppert (8–9)		10,551	Olympic Stadium	62–60
123	August 16	Giants	4–1	**Day** (7–4)	Schmidt (12–5)	**Biddle** (29)	16,446	Olympic Stadium	63–60
124	August 17	Giants	4–2	**Biddle** (4–5)	Ponson (14–9)		17,665	Olympic Stadium	64–60
125	August 18	Giants	4–0	**Vázquez** (11–8)	Hermanson (2–3)		9,224	Olympic Stadium	65–60
126	August 19	@ Dodgers	7–5	**Ayala** (8–3)	Quantrill (1–4)	**Biddle** (30)	30,107	Dodger Stadium	66–60
127	August 20	@ Dodgers	1–4 (10)	Gagné (2–3)	**Biddle** (4–6)		31,427	Dodger Stadium	66–61
128	August 21	@ Dodgers	1–2	Pérez (10–9)	**Day** (7–5)	Gagné (42)	33,319	Dodger Stadium	66–62
129	August 22	@ Padres	3–5	Linebrink (3–2)	**Eischen** (1–2)	Beck (18)	17,590	Qualcomm Stadium	66–63
130	August 23	@ Padres	0–1 (10)	Matthews (4–4)	**Biddle** (4–7)		29,450	Qualcomm Stadium	66–64
131	August 24	@ Padres	8–4	**Knott** (1–2)	Jarvis (4–6)		24,707	Qualcomm Stadium	67–64
132	August 25	Phillies	12–1	**Hernández** (14–7)	Wolf (12–9)		30,501	Olympic Stadium	68–64
133	August 26	Phillies	14–10	**Eischen** (2–2)	Williams (1–6)	**Ayala** (4)	12,509	Olympic Stadium	69–64
134	August 27	Phillies	9–6	**Almonte** (1–2)	Plesac (2–1)	**Biddle** (31)	20,105	Olympic Stadium	70–64
135	August 28	Phillies	4–0	**Vázquez** (12–8)	Telemaco (1–2)		20,030	Olympic Stadium	71–64
136	August 29	@ Marlins	2–3	Looper (5–3)	**Biddle** (4–8)		12,231	Pro Player Stadium	71–65
137	August 30	@ Marlins	3–4	Pavano (11–11)	**Hernández** (14–8)	Looper (25)	20,724	Pro Player Stadium	71–66
138	August 31	@ Marlins	3–5	Redman (11–8)	**Day** (7–6)	Urbina (27)	11,105	Pro Player Stadium	71–67

September (12–12)

#	Date	Opponent	Score	Win	Loss	Save	Attendance	Stadium	Record
139	September 1	@ Marlins	2–5	Penny (12–10)	**Ohka** (8–11)	Looper (26)	12,413	Pro Player Stadium	71–68
140	September 2	@ Phillies	3–5	Cormier (5–0)	**Vázquez** (12–9)	Plesac (2)	26,719	Veterans Stadium	71–69
141	September 3	@ Phillies	3–8	Millwood (14–9)	**Tucker** (0–2)		18,002	Veterans Stadium	71–70
142	September 5	vs. Marlins @ San Juan, PR	6–2	**Hernández** (15–8)	Redman (11–9)		11,509	Hiram Bithorn Stadium	72–70
143	September 6	vs. Marlins @ San Juan, PR	4–14	Penny (13–10)	**Ohka** (8–12)		14,570	Hiram Bithorn Stadium	72–71
144	September 7	vs. Marlins @ San Juan, PR	1–3	Willis (12–6)	**Vázquez** (12–10)	Looper (27)	12,647	Hiram Bithorn Stadium	72-72
145	September 9	vs. Cubs @ San Juan, PR	3–4	Zambrano (13–9)	**Day** (7–7)	Borowski (26)	15,632	Hiram Bithorn Stadium	72–73
146	September 10	vs. Cubs @ San Juan, PR	8–4	**Ayala** (9–3)	Farnsworth (3–2)		18,002	Hiram Bithorn Stadium	73-73
147	September 11	vs. Cubs @ San Juan, PR	3–2	**Ohka** (9–12)	Prior (15–6)	Eischen (1)	12,559	Hiram Bithorn Stadium	74–73
148	September 12	Mets	7–4	**Tucker** (1–2)	Leiter (14–8)	**Ayala** (5)	10,701	Olympic Stadium	75–73
149	September 13	Mets	4–5	Trachsel (15–9)	**Vázquez** (12–11)	Roberts (1)	15,086	Olympic Stadium	75–74
150	September 14	Mets	7–3	**Day** (8–7)	Glavine (9–13)		21,417	Olympic Stadium	76–74
151	September 15	Braves	6–10	Ramírez (11–4)	**Hernández** (15–9)		9,696	Olympic Stadium	76–75
152	September 16	Braves	5–4 (10)	**Biddle** (5–8)	Hernández (5–3)		9,843	Olympic Stadium	77–75
153	September 17	Braves	4–14	Hampton (14–7)	**Tucker** (1–3)		17,526	Olympic Stadium	77–76
154	September 18	@ Mets	1–0	**Vázquez** (13–11)	Trachsel (15–10)	**Cordero** (1)	18,914	Shea Stadium	78–76
155	September 19	@ Mets	7–1	**Day** (9–7)	Glavine (9–14)		33,083	Shea Stadium	79–76
156	September 20	@ Mets	4–3 (10)	**Cordero** (1–0)	Stanton (2–7)	**Biddle** (32)	37,294	Shea Stadium	80–76
157	September 21	@ Mets	4–2	**Ayala** (10–3)	Roberts (0–2)	**Biddle** (33)	28,702	Shea Stadium	81–76
158	September 23	@ Braves	0–2	Wright (2–5)	**Vázquez** (13–12)	Smoltz (45)	22,539	Turner Field	81–77
159	September 24	@ Braves	1–9	Ortiz (21–7)	**Day** (9–8)		23,594	Turner Field	81–78
160	September 26	@ Reds	5–1	**Ohka** (10–12)	Harang (5–6)		28,870	Great American Ballpark	82–78
161	September 27	@ Reds	2–4	Reith (2–3)	**Hernández** (15–10)		31,199	Great American Ballpark	82–79
162	September 28	@ Reds	2–1	**Tucker** (2–3)	Randall (2–5)	**Biddle** (34)	32,322	Great American Ballpark	83–79

=== Attendance ===
Including both games played in Montreal and "home" games played in San Juan, the Expos drew 1,025,639 fans during the 2003 season, and were 16th in attendance among the 16 National League teams. Their highest attendance for the season was a game in Montreal on April 22, which attracted 36,879 fans to see them play the Arizona Diamondbacks, while their lowest was for a game in Montreal on May 7 against the San Diego Padres, which drew only 5,111 fans. For games played in San Juan, the largest crowd was 18,264 for a game against the New York Mets on April 12, and the smallest was a crowd of 10,034 that came to a game against the Anaheim Angels on June 3.

== Player stats ==
=== Batting ===
Note: Pos = Position; G = Games played; AB = At bats; R = Runs scored; H = Hits; 2B = Doubles; 3B = Triples; HR = Home runs; RBI = Runs batted in; AVG = Batting average; SB = Stolen bases

Complete offensive statistics are available here.

Pos	Player	G	AB	R	H	2B	3B	HR	RBI	AVG	SB
C	Brian Schneider	108	335	34	77	26	1	9	46	.230	0
1B	Wil Cordero	130	436	57	121	27	0	16	71	.278	1
2B	José Vidro	144	509	77	158	36	0	15	65	.310	3
SS	Orlando Cabrera	162	626	95	186	47	2	17	80	.297	24
3B	Jamey Carroll	105	227	31	59	10	1	1	10	.260	5
LF	Brad Wilkerson	146	504	78	135	34	4	19	77	.268	13
CF	Endy Chávez	141	483	66	121	25	5	5	47	.251	18
RF	Vladimir Guerrero	112	394	71	130	20	3	25	79	.330	9
OF	Ron Calloway	126	340	36	81	17	1	9	52	.238	9
UT	José Macías	111	272	31	65	15	2	4	22	.239	4
C	Michael Barrett	70	226	33	47	9	2	10	30	.208	0
3B	Fernando Tatís	53	175	15	34	65	0	2	15	.194	2
2B	Henry Mateo	100	154	29	37	3	1	0	7	.240	11
3B	Edwards Guzmán	52	146	15	35	5	0	1	14	.240	0
3B	Todd Zeile	34	136	11	29	2	2	5	19	.257	1
1B	Jeff Liefer	35	88	6	17	3	0	3	18	.193	0
UT	Joe Vitiello	38	76	12	26	6	0	3	13	.342	0
OF	Matt Cepicky	5	8	0	2	1	0	0	0	.250	0
P	Liván Hernández	31	74	2	14	1	0	0	6	.189	0
P	Javier Vázquez	32	65	5	10	0	1	0	6	.154	0
P	Tomo Ohka	33	55	2	10	0	0	0	3	.182	1
P	Zach Day	23	47	2	2	0	0	0	2	.043	0
P	Claudio Vargas	21	30	1	0	0	0	0	0	.000	0
P	T. J. Tucker	44	19	1	5	1	0	0	0	.263	0
P	Tony Armas Jr.	5	10	0	2	0	0	0	0	.200	0
P	Eric Knott	13	5	0	0	0	0	0	0	.000	0
P	Joey Eischen	67	4	1	1	0	0	0	0	.250	0
P	Sun-woo Kim	4	3	0	0	0	0	0	0	.000	0
P	Dan Smith	30	2	0	0	0	0	0	0	.000	0
P	Tim Drew	6	2	1	0	0	0	0	0	.000	0
P	Scott Stewart	48	2	0	0	0	0	0	0	.000	0
P	Chad Cordero	12	0	0	0	0	0	0	0	–	0
P	Rocky Biddle	71	1	0	0	0	0	0	0	.000	0
P	Roy Corcoran	5	1	0	0	0	0	0	0	.000	0
P	Luis Ayala	62	1	0	0	0	0	0	0	.000	0
P	Britt Reames	2	1	0	0	0	0	0	0	.000	0
P	Scott Downs	1	1	0	0	0	0	0	0	.000	0
P	Héctor Almonte	28	1	0	0	0	0	0	0	.000	0
P	Vic Darensbourg	7	1	0	0	0	0	0	0	.000	0
P	Julio Mañón	19	1	0	0	0	0	0	0	.000	0
P	Bryan Hebson	2	0	0	0	0	0	0	0	–	0
P	José Mercedes	5	0	0	0	0	0	0	0	–	0
P	Anthony Ferrari	2	0	0	0	0	0	0	0	–	0
	Team totals	162	5437	711	1404	294	25	144	682	.258	100

=== Pitching ===
Note: Pos = Position; W = Wins; L = Losses; ERA = Earned run average; G = Games pitched; GS = Games started; SV = Saves; IP = Innings pitched; H = Hits allowed; R = Runs allowed; ER = Earned runs allowed; BB = Walks allowed; K = Strikeouts

Complete pitching statistics are available here.

Pos	Player	W	L	ERA	G	GS	SV	IP	H	R	ER	BB	K
SP	Liván Hernández	15	11	3.20	33	33	0	233.1	225	92	83	57	178
SP	Javier Vázquez	13	12	3.24	34	34	0	230.3	198	93	83	57	241
SP	Tomo Ohka	10	12	4.16	34	34	0	199.0	233	106	92	45	118
SP	Zach Day	9	8	4.18	23	23	0	131.1	132	64	61	59	61
SP	Claudio Vargas	6	8	4.34	23	20	0	114.0	111	59	55	41	62
CL	Rocky Biddle	5	8	4.65	73	0	34	71.2	71	43	37	40	54
RP	T. J. Tucker	2	3	4.73	45	7	0	80.0	90	49	42	20	47
RP	Luis Ayala	10	3	2.92	65	0	5	71.0	65	27	23	13	46
RP	Joey Eischen	2	2	3.06	70	0	1	53.0	57	27	18	13	40
RP	Scott Stewart	3	1	3.98	51	0	0	43.0	52	22	19	13	29
	Dan Smith	2	2	5.26	32	0	0	37.2	42	22	19	13	29
	Tony Armas Jr.	2	1	2.61	5	5	0	31.0	25	9	9	8	23
	Héctor Almonte	1	1	6.83	28	0	0	29.0	34	22	22	17	26
	Julio Mañón	1	2	4.13	23	0	1	28.1	26	13	13	17	15
	Eric Knott	1	2	5.12	13	1	0	19.1	23	12	11	6	17
	Sun-woo Kim	0	1	8.36	4	3	0	14.0	24	13	13	8	5
	Chad Cordero	1	0	1.64	12	0	1	11.0	4	2	2	3	12
	Tim Drew	0	2	12.46	6	1	0	8.2	12	12	12	8	3
	José Mercedes	0	0	0.00	5	0	0	7.1	6	3	0	5	3
	Roy Corcoran	0	0	1.23	5	0	0	7.1	7	2	1	3	2
	Vic Darensbourg	0	0	10.80	6	0	0	6.2	13	8	8	1	4
	Anthony Ferrari	0	0	6.75	4	0	0	4.0	4	3	3	5	1
	Scott Downs	0	1	15.00	1	1	0	3.0	5	5	5	3	4
	Bryan Hebson	0	0	13.50	2	0	0	2.0	4	3	3	1	1
	Britt Reames	0	0	27.00	2	0	0	1.1	4	4	4	2	1
	Team totals	83	79	4.01	162	162	42	1437.2	1467	716	640	463	1028

== Award winners ==
- Liván Hernández, National League Pitcher of the Month, July

2003 Major League Baseball All-Star Game

== Farm system ==
Level	Team	League	Manager
AAA	Edmonton Trappers	Pacific Coast League	Dave Huppert
AA	Harrisburg Senators	Eastern League	Dave Machemer
A	Brevard County Manatees	Florida State League	Doug Sisson
A	Savannah Sand Gnats	South Atlantic League	Joey Cora
A-Short Season	Vermont Expos	New York–Penn League	Dave Barnett
Rookie	GCL Expos	Gulf Coast League	Bob Henley
