= 2003 New York Mets season =

2003 New York Mets
- League: National League
- Division: East
- Ballpark: Shea Stadium
- City: New York
- Record: 66–95 (.410)
- Divisional place: 5th
- Owners: Fred Wilpon
- General managers: Steve Phillips, Jim Duquette
- Manager: Art Howe
- Television: WPIX (Tom Seaver, Ted Robinson, Ralph Kiner, Dave O'Brien); Fox Sports New York/MSG/MetroTV (Ralph Kiner, Fran Healy, Howie Rose, Ted Robinson, Keith Hernandez)
- Radio: WFAN (Bob Murphy, Gary Cohen, Ted Robinson); WADO (Spanish) (Juan Alicea, Billy Berroa)

The 2003 New York Mets season was the 42nd regular season for the Mets. They went 66–95 and finished fifth in the National League East, thirty-four and a half games behind the first place Atlanta Braves. This was the first season under full ownership of Fred Wilpon, who decided in the offseason to replace Bobby Valentine with Art Howe as manager; previously, Howe had managed the Oakland Athletics for the past seven seasons. The Mets played home games at Shea Stadium. The Mets would not finish last in the NL East again until 2026.

== Offseason ==
- November 25, 2002: Jorge Velandia was signed as a free agent with the New York Mets.
- December 5, 2002: Tom Glavine was signed as a free agent with the New York Mets.
- December 19, 2002: Mike Stanton was signed as a free agent with the New York Mets.
- January 11, 2003: Tsuyoshi Shinjo was signed as a free agent with the New York Mets.
- February 11, 2003: Jay Bell signed as a free agent with the New York Mets.
- February 13, 2003: David Cone signed as a free agent with the New York Mets.

== Regular season ==
After their disappointing 2002 season the Mets entered 2003 hoping to contend for a playoff spot. But the season ended up being a massive disappointment as they were defeated by the Cubs at home 15–2 on opening day and finished just 66–95.

=== Opening Day starters ===
- Roberto Alomar
- Jeromy Burnitz
- Roger Cedeño
- Cliff Floyd
- Tom Glavine
- Mike Piazza
- Rey Sánchez
- Mo Vaughn
- Ty Wigginton

=== Detailed record ===
Team	Home	Away	Total	Win %
NL East
Atlanta Braves	5–4	3–7	8–11	.421
Florida Marlins	3–6	4–6	7–12	.368
Montreal Expos	4–6	1–8	5–14	.263
Philadelphia Phillies	3–7	4–5	7–12	.368
Total	15–23	12–26	27–49	.355
NL Central
Chicago Cubs	1–2	0–3	1–5	.167
Cincinnati Reds	1–2	3–0	4–2	.667
Houston Astros	2–1	2–1	4–2	.667
Milwaukee Brewers	1–5	2–1	3–6	.333
Pittsburgh Pirates	2–1	2–1	4–2	.667
St. Louis Cardinals	1–2	0–3	1–5	.167
Total	8–13	9–9	17–22	.436
NL West
Arizona Diamondbacks	1–2	1–2	2–4	.333
Colorado Rockies	4–0	1–2	5–2	.714
Los Angeles Dodgers	1–2	2–1	3–3	.500
San Diego Padres	2–1	1–2	3–3	.500
San Francisco Giants	2–0	2–2	4–2	.667
Total	10–5	7–9	17–14	.548
American League
Anaheim Angels	—	2–1	2–1	.667
New York Yankees	0–3	0–3	0–6	.000
Seattle Mariners	1–2	—	1–2	.333
Texas Rangers	—	2–1	2–1	.667
Total	1–5	4–5	5–10	.333

Month	Games	Won	Lost	Win %
March	1	0	1	.000
April	26	11	15	.423
May	28	14	14	.500
June	26	10	16	.385
July	27	9	18	.333
August	27	15	12	.556
September	26	7	19	.269
Total	161	66	95	.410

	Games	Won	Lost	Win %
Home	80	34	46	.425
Away	81	32	49	.395

== Season standings ==
=== National League East ===
NL East
Team	W	L	Pct.	GB	Home	Road
Atlanta Braves	101	61	.623	—	55‍–‍26	46‍–‍35
Florida Marlins	91	71	.562	10	53‍–‍28	38‍–‍43
Philadelphia Phillies	86	76	.531	15	49‍–‍32	37‍–‍44
Montreal Expos	83	79	.512	18	52‍–‍29	31‍–‍50
New York Mets	66	95	.410	34½	34‍–‍46	32‍–‍49

=== Record vs. opponents ===
2003 National League record Source: MLB Standings Grid – 2003
Team	AZ	ATL	CHC	CIN	COL	FLA	HOU	LAD	MIL	MON	NYM	PHI	PIT	SD	SF	STL	AL
Arizona	—	2–5	2–4	7–2	10–9	2–5	5–1	10–9	3–3	4–2	4–2	4–2	3–3	9–10	5–14	3–3	11–4
Atlanta	5–2	—	4–2	3–3	6–0	9–10	5–1	4–2	4–2	12–7	11–8	9–10	7–2	6–1	2–4	4–2	10–5
Chicago	4–2	2–4	—	10–7	3–3	4–2	9–7	2–4	10–6	3–3	5–1	1–5	10–8	4–2	4–2	8–9	9–9
Cincinnati	2–7	3–3	7–10	—	4–2	2–4	5–12	2–4	8–10	2–4	2–4	5–4	5–11	3–3	3–3	9–7	7–5
Colorado	9–10	0–6	3–3	2–4	—	4–2	2–4	7–12	5–1	3–4	2–5	2–4	3–6	12–7	7–12	4–2	9–6
Florida	5–2	10–9	2–4	4–2	2–4	—	1–5	2–5	7–2	13–6	12–7	13–6	2–4	5–1	1–5	3–3	9–6
Houston	1–5	1–5	7–9	12–5	4–2	5–1	—	4–2	9–8	3–3	2–4	2–4	10–6	3–3	2–4	11–7	11–7
Los Angeles	9–10	2–4	4–2	4–2	12–7	5–2	2–4	—	4–2	4–2	3–3	2–5	5–1	8–11	6–13	4–2	11–7
Milwaukee	3–3	2–4	6–10	10–8	1–5	2–7	8–9	2–4	—	0–6	6–3	4–2	10–7	5–1	1–5	3–13	5–7
Montreal	2–4	7–12	3–3	4–2	4–3	6–13	3–3	2–4	6–0	—	14–5	8–11	3–3	4–2	7–0	1–5	9–9
New York	2–4	8–11	1–5	4–2	5–2	7–12	4–2	3–3	3–6	5–14	—	7–12	4–2	3–3	4–2	1–5	5–10
Philadelphia	2–4	10–9	5–1	4–5	4–2	6–13	4–2	5–2	2–4	11–8	12–7	—	2–4	4–3	3–3	4–2	8–7
Pittsburgh	3–3	2–7	8–10	11–5	6–3	4–2	6–10	1–5	7–10	3–3	2–4	4–2	—	4–2	2–4	7–10	5–7
San Diego	10–9	1–6	2–4	3–3	7–12	1–5	3–3	11–8	1–5	2–4	3–3	3–4	2–4	—	5–14	2–4	8–10
San Francisco	14–5	4–2	2–4	3–3	12–7	5–1	4–2	13–6	5–1	0–7	2–4	3–3	4–2	14–5	—	5–1	10–8
St. Louis	3–3	2–4	9–8	7–9	2–4	3–3	7–11	2–4	13–3	5–1	5–1	2–4	10–7	4–2	1–5	—	10–8

=== Notable transactions ===
- July 1, 2003: Roberto Alomar was traded by the New York Mets with cash to the Chicago White Sox for Edwin Almonte, Royce Ring, and Andrew Salvo.
- July 16, 2003: Armando Benítez was traded by the New York Mets to the New York Yankees for Ryan Bicondoa, Jason Anderson and Anderson Garcia.
- July 29, 2003: Kenny Kelly was traded by the Seattle Mariners to the New York Mets for Rey Sánchez and cash.

== Game log ==
=== Regular season ===
Legend
Mets Win	Mets Loss	Game Postponed
Bold = Mets team member

2003 Game Log
Overall: 66–95 (Home: 34–46; Away: 32–49)
March/April: (11–16) Home: 8–7; Away: 3–9

#	Date	Opponent	Score	Win	Loss	Save	Location	Attendance	Record
1	March 31	Cubs	2–15	Wood (1–0)	**Glavine** (0–1)	—	**Shea Stadium**	53,586	0–1
2	April 2	Cubs	4–1	**Leiter** (1–0)	Clement (0–1)	**Benitez** (1)	**Shea Stadium**	20,594	1–1
3	April 3	Cubs	3–6	Prior (1–0)	**Trachsel** (0–1)	—	**Shea Stadium**	17,244	1–2
4	April 4	Expos	4–0	**Cone** (1–0)	Ohka (0–1)	—	**Shea Stadium**	18,040	2–2
5	April 5	Expos	3–1	**Glavine** (1–1)	Armas (1–1)	**Benitez** (2)	**Shea Stadium**	36,817	3–2
6	April 6	Expos	5–8	Stewart (1–0)	**Benitez** (0–1)	Biddle (2)	**Shea Stadium**	35,093	3–3
7	April 8	@ Marlins	4–2	**Leiter** (2–0)	Redman (1–1)	**Benitez** (3)	Pro Player Stadium	10,103	4–3
8	April 9	@ Marlins	2–3	Looper (1–0)	**Stanton** (0–1)	—	Pro Player Stadium	10,052	4–4
9	April 10	@ Marlins	3–4	Spooneybarger (1–0)	**Benitez** (0–2)	—	Pro Player Stadium	10,267	4–5
10	April 11	@ Expos*	0–10	Ohka (1–1)	**Cone** (1–1)	—	Hiram Bithorn Stadium	17,906	4–6
11	April 12	@ Expos*	4–5	Hernandez (1–0)	**Seo** (0–1)	Biddle (3)	Hiram Bithorn Stadium	18,264	4–7
12	April 13	@ Expos*	1–2 (10)	Biddle (1–0)	**Stanton** (0–2)	—	Hiram Bithorn Stadium	16,332	4–8
13	April 14	@ Expos*	3–5	Smith (1–0)	**Strickland** (0–1)	Biddle (4)	Hiram Bithorn Stadium	13,155	4–9
14	April 15	@ Pirates	3–1	**Glavine** (2–1)	Fogg (1–2)	**Benitez** (4)	PNC Park	14,728	5–9
15	April 16	@ Pirates	3–6	Suppan (3–0)	**Cone** (1–2)	—	PNC Park	12,609	5–10
16	April 17	@ Pirates	7–2	**Seo** (1–1)	D'Amico (1–2)	—	PNC Park	11,299	6–10
17	April 18	Marlins	6–3	**Weathers** (1–0)	Nunez (0–2)	**Benitez** (5)	**Shea Stadium**	18,525	7–10
18	April 19	Marlins	5–6	Looper (2–0)	**Benitez** (0–3)	—	**Shea Stadium**	36,448	7–11
19	April 20	Marlins	7–4	**Glavine** (3–1)	Nunez (0–3)	—	**Shea Stadium**	26,245	8–11
20	April 22	Astros	2–6	Redding (1–2)	**Cone** (1–3)	—	**Shea Stadium**	31,733	8–12
21	April 23	Astros	4–2	**Leiter** (3–0)	Oswalt (2–2)	**Benitez** (6)	**Shea Stadium**	20,322	9–12
22	April 24	Astros	7–4	**Astacio** (1–0)	Miller (0–2)	**Benitez** (7)	**Shea Stadium**	31,656	10–12
23	April 25	Diamondbacks	4–3	**Stanton** (1–2)	Villarreal (1–1)	**Benitez** (8)	**Shea Stadium**	24,725	11–12
–	April 26	Diamondbacks	Postponed (rain); rescheduled for April 27						
24	April 27 (1)	Diamondbacks	1–6	Webb (1–0)	**Glavine** (3–2)	—	**Shea Stadium**	N/A	11–13
25	April 27 (2)	Diamondbacks	3–7	Johnson (1–2)	**Seo** (1–2)	Mantei (3)	**Shea Stadium**	36,491	11–14
26	April 29	@ Cardinals	3–13	Morris (2–2)	**Leiter** (3–1)	—	Busch Stadium	30,275	11–15
27	April 30	@ Cardinals	4–13	Williams (4–0)	**Astacio** (1–1)	—	Busch Stadium	30,265	11–16
*Games the Montreal Expos played at Hiram Bithorn Stadium in San Juan, Puerto Rico, during the 2003 season counted as Expos home games.

May: (14–14) Home: 6–5; Away: 8–9

#	Date	Opponent	Score	Win	Loss	Save	Location	Attendance	Record
28	May 1	@ Cardinals	5–6 (10)	Eldred (2–0)	**Strickland** (0–2)	—	Busch Stadium	35,283	11–17
29	May 2	@ Brewers	9–3	**Glavine** (4–2)	Rusch (1–5)	—	Miller Park	16,315	12–17
30	May 3	@ Brewers	2–3	Foster (2–0)	**Weathers** (1–1)	DeJean (5)	Miller Park	19,796	12–18
31	May 4	@ Brewers	5–3	**Leiter** (4–1)	Kinney (2–2)	**Benitez** (9)	Miller Park	18,571	13–18
32	May 6	Dodgers	3–2	**Astacio** (2–1)	Perez (1–2)	**Benitez** (10)	**Shea Stadium**	21,173	14–18
33	May 7	Dodgers	1–2	Nomo (4–4)	**Trachsel** (0–2)	Gagne (11)	**Shea Stadium**	18,965	14–19
34	May 8	Dodgers	1–6	Ishii (3–1)	**Glavine** (4–3)	—	**Shea Stadium**	18,729	14–20
35	May 9	Padres	4–5	Hackman (1–0)	**Weathers** (1–2)	Orosco (2)	**Shea Stadium**	29,855	14–21
36	May 10	Padres	4–2 (10)	**Stanton** (2–2)	Wright (1–5)	—	**Shea Stadium**	32,930	15–21
37	May 11	Padres	3–2	**Lloyd** (1–0)	Matthews (1–1)	**Benitez** (11)	**Shea Stadium**	30,694	16–21
38	May 12	@ Rockies	9–6	**Trachsel** (1–2)	Young (0–1)	**Benitez** (12)	Coors Field	25,433	17–21
39	May 13	@ Rockies	8–9	Reed (3–1)	**Cerda** (0–1)	Jimenez (9)	Coors Field	25,043	17–22
40	May 14	@ Rockies	5–6	Reed (4–1)	**Stanton** (2–3)	Jimenez (10)	Coors Field	26,755	17–23
41	May 15	@ Giants	3–11	Rueter (4–1)	**Leiter** (4–2)	—	Pacific Bell Park	36,542	17–24
42	May 16	@ Giants	5–7	Nathan (5–1)	**Weathers** (1–3)	Worrell (12)	Pacific Bell Park	39,160	17–25
43	May 17	@ Giants	5–1	**Trachsel** (2–2)	Moss (5–2)	—	Pacific Bell Park	42,259	18–25
44	May 18	@ Giants	5–1	**Glavine** (5–3)	Ainsworth (3–4)	—	SBC Park	42,590	19–25
45	May 20	Phillies	7–11	Myers (4–3)	**Lloyd** (1–1)	—	**Shea Stadium**	25,281	19–26
46	May 21	Phillies	5–4	**Benitez** (1–3)	Adams (0–2)	—	**Shea Stadium**	29,551	20–26
47	May 22	Phillies	6–3	**Astacio** (3–1)	Padilla (3–6)	**Benitez** (13)	**Shea Stadium**	20,101	21–26
48	May 23	@ Braves	6–5	**Trachsel** (3–2)	Ortiz (6–3)	**Benitez** (14)	Turner Field	33,270	22–26
49	May 24	@ Braves	4–10	Ramirez (4–2)	**Glavine** (5–4)	—	Turner Field	40,912	22–27
50	May 25	@ Braves	1–3	Hernandez (4–1)	**Weathers** (1–4)	Smoltz (19)	Turner Field	41,432	22–28
51	May 27	@ Phillies	4–2	**Leiter** (5–2)	Wolf (5–3)	**Benitez** (15)	Veterans Stadium	18,081	23–28
52	May 28	@ Phillies	3–11	Padilla (4–6)	**Astacio** (3–2)	—	Veterans Stadium	21,389	23–29
53	May 29	@ Phillies	5–0	**Trachsel** (4–2)	Millwood (7–2)	—	Veterans Stadium	19,568	24–29
54	May 30	Braves	2–5	Maddux (4–5)	**Glavine** (5–5)	Smoltz (20)	**Shea Stadium**	26,439	24–30
55	May 31	Braves	4–2	**Seo** (2–2)	Hampton (2–3)	**Benitez** (16)	**Shea Stadium**	33,378	25–30

June: (10–16) Home: 4–9; Away: 6–7

#	Date	Opponent	Score	Win	Loss	Save	Location	Attendance	Record
56	June 1	Braves	10–4	**Leiter** (6–2)	Gryboski (3–3)	—	**Shea Stadium**	25,162	26–30
–	June 3	Brewers	Postponed (rain); rescheduled for June 5						
–	June 4	Brewers	Postponed (rain); rescheduled for July 28						
57	June 5 (1)	Brewers	7–8	Kinney (4–4)	**Trachsel** (4–3)	DeJean (13)	**Shea Stadium**	N/A	26–31
58	June 5 (2)	Brewers	3–5	Sheets (6–4)	**Glavine** (5–6)	DeJean (14)	**Shea Stadium**	19,048	26–32
59	June 6	Mariners	3–2	**Seo** (3–2)	Franklyn (4–4)	**Benitez** (17)	**Shea Stadium**	26,684	27–32
–	June 7	Mariners	Postponed (rain); rescheduled for June 8						
60	June 8 (1)	Mariners	1–13	Garcia (6–6)	**Leiter** (6–3)	—	**Shea Stadium**	N/A	27–33
61	June 8 (2)	Mariners	0–7	Moyer (10–2)	**Bacsik** (0–1)	—	**Shea Stadium**	39,820	27–34
62	June 10	@ Rangers	7–9	Thomson (4–7)	**Trachsel** (4–4)	Urbina (18)	The Ballpark in Arlington	20,581	27–35
63	June 11	@ Rangers	8–2	**Seo** (4–2)	Santos (0–1)	—	The Ballpark in Arlington	19,087	28–35
64	June 12	@ Rangers	11–0	**Leiter** (7–3)	Lewis (4–5)	—	The Ballpark in Arlington	19,044	29–35
65	June 13	@ Angels	7–3	**Bacsik** (1–1)	Sele (3–4)	—	Edison International Field of Anaheim	38,294	30–35
66	June 14	@ Angels	3–13	Ortiz (7–5)	**Roach** (0–1)	—	Edison International Field of Anaheim	43,449	30–36
67	June 15	@ Angels	8–0	**Trachsel** (5–4)	Washburn (6–7)	—	Edison International Field of Anaheim	43,721	31–36
68	June 16	@ Marlins	0–1	Willis (6–1)	**Glavine** (5–7)	—	Pro Player Stadium	10,624	31–37
69	June 17	@ Marlins	5–0	**Seo** (5–2)	Pavano (5–8)	—	Pro Player Stadium	10,359	32–37
70	June 18	@ Marlins	10–5	**Leiter** (8–3)	Penny (5–5)	**Wheeler** (1)	Pro Player Stadium	11,326	33–37
71	June 19	@ Marlins	1–5	Phelps (3–2)	**Bacsik** (1–2)	—	Pro Player Stadium	10,400	33–38
72	June 20	Yankees	0–5	Pettitte (7–6)	**Trachsel** (5–5)	—	**Shea Stadium**	55,386	33–39
–	June 21	Yankees	Postponed (rain); rescheduled for June 28						
73	June 22	Yankees	3–7 (11)	Rivera (2–0)	**Lloyd** (1–2)	—	**Shea Stadium**	55,031	33–40
74	June 24	Marlins	4–8	Penny (6–5)	**Leiter** (8–4)	Tejera (1)	**Shea Stadium**	22,226	33–41
75	June 25	Marlins	6–3	**Trachsel** (6–5)	Redman (5–3)	**Benitez** (18)	**Shea Stadium**	22,563	34–41
76	June 26	Marlins	1–6	Willis (8–1)	**Heilman** (0–1)	—	**Shea Stadium**	30,378	34–42
77	June 27	@ Yankees	4–6	Wells (10–2)	**Seo** (5–3)	Miceli (1)	Yankee Stadium	55,226	34–43
78	June 28 (1)	@ Yankees	1–7	Clemens (8–5)	**Griffiths** (0–1)	—	Yankee Stadium	55,343	34–44
79	June 28 (2)	Yankees	8–9	Claussen (1–0)	**Glavine** (5–8)	Rivera (13)	**Shea Stadium**	36,372	34–45
80	June 29	@ Yankees	3–5	Weaver (4–6)	**Leiter** (8–5)	Rivera (14)	Yankee Stadium	55,444	34–46
81	June 30	Expos	3–1	**Trachsel** (7–5)	Vazquez (6–6)	**Benitez** (19)	**Shea Stadium**	29,829	35–46

July: (9–18) Home: 4–12; Away: 5–6

#	Date	Opponent	Score	Win	Loss	Save	Location	Attendance	Record
82	July 1	Expos	7–6	**Benitez** (2–3)	Manon (0–2)	—	**Shea Stadium**	30,084	36–46
83	July 2	Expos	4–11	Hernandez (7–6)	**Seo** (5–4)	—	**Shea Stadium**	35,547	36–47
84	July 4	@ Reds	7–2	**Glavine** (6–8)	Haynes (1–8)	**Benitez** (20)	Great American Ball Park	35,511	37–47
85	July 5	@ Reds	6–2	**Trachsel** (8–5)	Graves (4–8)	**Weathers** (1)	Great American Ball Park	41,020	38–47
86	July 6	@ Reds	7–5	**Cerda** (1–1)	Reith (1–1)	**Benitez** (21)	Great American Ball Park	31,054	39–47
87	July 7	Braves	3–7	Ramirez (8–2)	**Seo** (5–5)	—	**Shea Stadium**	32,399	39–48
88	July 8	Braves	3–5	Reynolds (6–4)	**Roach** (0–2)	Smoltz (33)	**Shea Stadium**	29,096	39–49
89	July 9	Braves	3–6	Ortiz (12–4)	**Glavine** (6–9)	Smoltz (34)	**Shea Stadium**	30,308	39–50
90	July 10	Phillies	2–7	Padilla (8–8)	**Trachsel** (8–6)	—	**Shea Stadium**	25,913	39–51
91	July 11	Phillies	3–10	Wolf (10–4)	**Heilman** (0–2)	—	**Shea Stadium**	35,884	39–52
92	July 12	Phillies	2–4 (11)	Mesa (4–5)	**Franco** (0–1)	—	**Shea Stadium**	33,452	39–53
93	July 13	Phillies	4–3	**Benitez** (3–3)	Adams (1–3)	—	**Shea Stadium**	31,630	40–53
**74th All-Star Game in Chicago, Illinois**
94	July 17	@ Braves	2–3	Maddux (8–8)	**Franco** (0–2)	—	Turner Field	36,688	40–54
95	July 18	@ Braves	4–11	Hampton (6–5)	**Seo** (5–6)	—	Turner Field	44,815	40–55
96	July 19	@ Braves	4–7	Ortiz (13–4)	**Glavine** (6–10)	Smoltz (35)	Turner Field	45,759	40–56
97	July 20	@ Braves	8–11	King (3–0)	**Stanton** (2–4)	Smoltz (36)	Turner Field	36,029	40–57
98	July 21	@ Phillies	8–6	**Heilman** (1–2)	Duckworth (3–4)	**Franco** (1)	Veterans Stadium	33,208	41–57
99	July 22	@ Phillies	7–5	**Trachsel** (9–6)	Millwood (10–7)	**Wheeler** (2)	Veterans Stadium	37,164	42–57
100	July 23	@ Expos	2–5	Vazquez (8–6)	**Seo** (5–7)	Biddle (23)	Olympic Stadium	8,853	42–58
101	July 24	@ Expos	1–5	Hernandez (10–6)	**Glavine** (6–11)	Biddle (24)	Olympic Stadium	9,337	42–59
102	July 25	Reds	3–1	**Leiter** (9–5)	Graves (4–11)	**Stanton** (1)	**Shea Stadium**	34,021	43–59
103	July 26	Reds	3–8	Acevedo (2–0)	**Heilman** (1–3)	—	**Shea Stadium**	29,305	43–60
104	July 27	Reds	5–8	Wilson (6–8)	**Trachsel** (9–7)	Williamson (21)	**Shea Stadium**	30,173	43–61
105	July 28	Brewers	2–4	Estrella (3–2)	**Weathers** (1–5)	Kolb (3)	**Shea Stadium**	6,056	43–62
106	July 29	Brewers	3–6	Sheets (10–7)	**Wheeler** (0–1)	DeJean (18)	**Shea Stadium**	22,846	43–63
107	July 30	Brewers	2–0	**Leiter** (10–5)	Obermueller (0–2)	**Weathers** (2)	**Shea Stadium**	22,389	44–63
108	July 31	Brewers	3–4	Kinney (7–8)	**Heilman** (1–4)	Kolb (4)	**Shea Stadium**	27,590	44–64

August: (15–12) Home: 7–5; Away: 8–7

#	Date	Opponent	Score	Win	Loss	Save	Location	Attendance	Record
109	August 1	Cardinals	2–8	Kline (4–4)	**Wheeler** (0–2)	—	**Shea Stadium**	23,578	44–65
110	August 2	Cardinals	9–10	Tomko (7–7)	**Seo** (5–8)	Yan (1)	**Shea Stadium**	30,898	44–66
111	August 3	Cardinals	13–5	**Griffiths** (1–1)	Stephenson (5–11)	—	**Shea Stadium**	27,592	45–66
112	August 5	@ Astros	10–1	**Leiter** (11–5)	Villone (3–2)	—	Minute Maid Park	31,582	46–66
113	August 6	@ Astros	1–11	Miller (8–10)	**Heilman** (1–5)	—	Minute Maid Park	30,154	46–67
114	August 7	@ Astros	5–4	**Trachsel** (10–7)	Lidge (4–2)	**Stanton** (2)	Minute Maid Park	31,250	47–67
115	August 8	@ Diamondbacks	3–1	**Glavine** (7–11)	Webb (7–5)	**Stanton** (3)	Bank One Ballpark	36,335	48–67
116	August 9	@ Diamondbacks	1–2	Randolph (6–0)	**Franco** (0–3)	—	Bank One Ballpark	41,934	48–68
117	August 10	@ Diamondbacks	4–7	Johnson (3–4)	**Leiter** (11–6)	Mantei (15)	Bank One Ballpark	37,521	48–69
118	August 12	Giants	5–4	**Heilman** (2–5)	Ponson (14–8)	**Weathers** (3)	**Shea Stadium**	37,461	49–69
119	August 13	Giants	9–2	**Trachsel** (11–7)	Williams (5–3)	—	**Shea Stadium**	31,759	50–69
–	August 14	Giants	Cancelled (power outage)						
120	August 15	Rockies	5–0	**Glavine** (8–11)	Oliver (10–8)	—	**Shea Stadium**	28,081	51–69
121	August 16	Rockies	13–4	**Seo** (6–8)	Chacon (11–8)	—	**Shea Stadium**	28,233	52–69
122	August 17	Rockies	6–4	**Leiter** (12–6)	Jennings (10–11)	**Weathers** (4)	**Shea Stadium**	28,393	53–69
123	August 18	Rockies	8–0	**Trachsel** (12–7)	Tsao (2–1)	—	**Shea Stadium**	23,865	54–69
124	August 19	@ Padres	2–3	Limebrink (2–2)	**Stanton** (2–5)	Beck (17)	Qualcomm Stadium	21,794	54–70
125	August 20	@ Padres	1–2	Beck (3–1)	**Roberts** (0–1)	—	Qualcomm Stadium	16,532	54–71
126	August 21	@ Padres	5–1	**Seo** (7–8)	Perez (4–7)	—	Qualcomm Stadium	21,958	55–71
127	August 22	@ Dodgers	1–2	Nomo (15–9)	**Leiter** (12–7)	Gagne (43)	Dodger Stadium	40,714	55–72
128	August 23	@ Dodgers	4–0	**Trachsel** (13–7)	Ashby (3–10)	—	Dodger Stadium	44,449	56–72
129	August 24	@ Dodgers	2–1	**Glavine** (9–11)	Brown (12–7)	**Franco** (2)	Dodger Stadium	45,496	57–72
130	August 26	@ Braves	6–5	**Seo** (8–8)	Reynolds (10–7)	**Stanton** (4)	Turner Field	24,694	58–72
131	August 27	@ Braves	1–4	Maddux (13–10)	**Heilman** (2–6)	Mercker (1)	Turner Field	23,755	58–73
132	August 28	@ Braves	3–1	**Leiter** (13–7)	Hampton (12–6)	**Weathers** (5)	Turner Field	27,856	59–73
133	August 29	Phillies	0–7	Millwood (13–9)	**Trachsel** (13–8)	—	**Shea Stadium**	33,208	59–74
134	August 30	Phillies	2–4	Wolf (13–9)	**Glavine** (9–12)	Mesa (23)	**Shea Stadium**	26,769	59–75
135	August 31	Phillies	1–4	Padilla (12–9)	**Seo** (8–9)	Mesa (24)	**Shea Stadium**	26,180	59–76

September: (7–19) Home: 5–8; Away: 2–11

#	Date	Opponent	Score	Win	Loss	Save	Location	Attendance	Record
136	September 1	Braves	3–2	**Wheeler** (1–2)	Hodges (3–3)	**Weathers** (6)	**Shea Stadium**	23,877	60–76
137	September 2	Braves	3–1	**Leiter** (14–7)	Hampton (12–7)	**Weathers** (7)	**Shea Stadium**	24,390	61–76
138	September 3	Braves	9–3	**Trachsel** (14–8)	Ortiz (18–6)	—	**Shea Stadium**	16,439	62–76
139	September 4	@ Phillies	5–6	de los Santos (4–3)	**Stanton** (2–6)	—	Veterans Stadium	19,259	62–77
140	September 5	@ Phillies	0–1	Padilla (13–9)	**Seo** (8–10)	Cormier (1)	Veterans Stadium	26,712	62–78
141	September 6	@ Phillies	6–9	Myers (13–7)	**Griffiths** (1–2)	Wendell (1)	Veterans Stadium	38,671	62–79
142	September 7	@ Phillies	4–5 (11)	Cormier (6–0)	**Wheeler** (1–3)	—	Veterans Stadium	29,159	62–80
143	September 8	Marlins	0–5	Beckett (8–7)	**Trachsel** (14–9)	—	**Shea Stadium**	15,155	62–81
144	September 9	Marlins	1–3	Urbina (3–4)	**Weathers** (1–6)	Looper (28)	**Shea Stadium**	29,410	62–82
145	September 10	Marlins	3–7	Redman (12–9)	**Seo** (8–11)	—	**Shea Stadium**	16,699	62–83
146	September 12	@ Expos	4–7	Tucker (1–2)	**Leiter** (14–8)	Ayala (5)	Olympic Stadium	10,701	62–84
147	September 13	@ Expos	5–4	**Trachsel** (15–9)	Vazquez (12–11)	**Roberts** (1)	Olympic Stadium	15,086	63–84
148	September 14	@ Expos	3–7	Day (8–7)	**Glavine** (9–13)	—	Olympic Stadium	21,417	63–85
149	September 15	@ Cubs	1–4	Clement (13–11)	**Griffiths** (1–3)	Borowski (29)	Wrigley Field	38,698	63–86
150	September 16	@ Cubs	2–3	Prior (16–6)	**Seo** (8–12)	Borowski (30)	Wrigley Field	39,534	63–87
151	September 17	@ Cubs	0–2	Wood (13–11)	**Leiter** (14–9)	—	Wrigley Field	38,482	63–88
152	September 18	Expos	0–1	Vazquez (13–11)	**Trachsel** (15–10)	Cordero (1)	**Shea Stadium**	18,914	63–89
153	September 19	Expos	1–7	Day (9–7)	**Glavine** (9–14)	—	**Shea Stadium**	33,083	63–90
154	September 20	Expos	3–4 (10)	Cordero (1–0)	**Stanton** (2–7)	Biddle (32)	**Shea Stadium**	37,294	63–91
155	September 21	Expos	2–4	Ayala (10–3)	**Roberts** (0–2)	Biddle (33)	**Shea Stadium**	28,702	63–92
156	September 23	Pirates	1–0	**Leiter** (15–9)	Wells (9–9)	—	**Shea Stadium**	17,830	64–92
157	September 24	Pirates	5–3	**Trachsel** (16–10)	D'Amico (9–16)	**Stanton** (5)	**Shea Stadium**	22,134	65–92
158	September 25	Pirates	1–3	Torres (7–5)	**Roberts** (0–3)	Tavarez (10)	**Shea Stadium**	25,081	65–93
159	September 26	@ Marlins	3–4	Pavano (12–13)	**Heilman** (2–7)	Urbina (32)	Pro Player Stadium	33,215	65–94
160	September 27	@ Marlins	9–3	**Seo** (9–11)	Tejera (3–4)	—	Pro Player Stadium	30,204	66–94
161	September 28	@ Marlins	0–4	Willis (14–6)	**Griffiths** (1–4)	—	Pro Player Stadium	27,529	66–95

== Roster ==
2003 New York Mets
Roster
Pitchers: 56 Edwin Almonte; 17 Jason Anderson; 34 Pedro Astacio; 33 Mike Bacsik; 49 Armando Benítez; 43 Jaime Cerda; 16 David Cone; 55 Pedro Feliciano; 45 John Franco; 47 Tom Glavine; 46 Jeremy Griffiths; 48 Aaron Heilman; 22 Al Leiter; 17 Graeme Lloyd; 27 Jason Middlebrook; 49 Orber Moreno; 57 Jason Roach; 36 Grant Roberts; 40 Jae Seo; 32 Mike Stanton; 38 Pat Strange; 28 Scott Strickland; 29 Steve Trachsel; 39 David Weathers; 39 Dan Wheeler	Catchers: 31 Mike Piazza; 3 Vance Wilson; Infielders: 12 Roberto Alomar; 44 Jay Bell; 00,52 Tony Clark; 12 Danny Garcia; 11 Joe McEwing; 23 Jason Phillips; 7 José Reyes; 10 Rey Sánchez; 26 Marco Scutaro; 42 Mo Vaughn; 13 Jorge Velandia; 9 Ty Wigginton	Outfielders: 20 Jeromy Burnitz; 19 Roger Cedeño; 61 Jeff Duncan; 30 Cliff Floyd; 21 Raul González; 6 Timo Pérez; 20 Prentice Redman; 5 Tsuyoshi Shinjo; Other batters: 10 Joe DePastino; 27 Mike Glavine; 50 Matt Watson	Manager: 18 Art Howe; Coaches: 25 Don Baylor (bench); 4 Matt Galante (third base); 2 Gary Pettis (first base); 53 Vern Ruhle (pitching); 52 Rick Waits (bullpen); 15 Denny Walling (hitting)

== Player stats ==
=== Batting ===
==== Starters by position ====
Note: Pos = Position; G = Games played; AB = At bats; H = Hits; Avg. = Batting average; HR = Home runs; RBI = Runs batted in

Pos	Player	G	AB	H	Avg.	HR	RBI
C	Vance Wilson	96	268	65	.243	8	39
1B	Jason Phillips	119	403	120	.298	11	58
2B	Roberto Alomar	73	263	69	.262	2	22
SS	José Reyes	69	274	84	.307	5	32
3B	Ty Wigginton	156	573	146	.255	11	71
LF	Cliff Floyd	108	365	106	.290	18	68
CF	Jeff Duncan	56	139	27	.194	1	10
RF	Roger Cedeño	148	484	129	.267	7	37

==== Other batters ====
Note: G = Games played; AB = At bats; H = Hits; Avg. = Batting average; HR = Home runs; RBI = Runs batted in

Player	G	AB	H	Avg.	HR	RBI
Timo Pérez	127	346	93	.269	4	42
Joe McEwing	119	278	67	.241	1	16
Tony Clark	125	254	59	.232	16	43
Mike Piazza	68	234	67	.286	11	34
Jeromy Burnitz	65	234	64	.274	18	45
Raúl González	107	217	50	.230	2	21
Rey Sánchez	56	174	36	.207	0	12
Jay Bell	72	116	21	.181	0	3
Tsuyoshi Shinjo	62	114	22	.193	1	7
Mo Vaughn	27	79	15	.190	3	15
Marco Scutaro	48	75	16	.213	2	6
Jorge Velandia	23	58	11	.190	0	8
Daniel Garcia	19	56	12	.214	2	6
Prentice Redman	15	24	3	.125	1	2
Matt Watson	15	23	4	.174	0	2
Mike Glavine	6	7	1	.143	0	0
Joe DePastino	2	2	0	.000	0	0

=== Pitching ===
==== Starting pitchers ====
Note: G = Games pitched; IP = Innings pitched; W = Wins; L = Losses; ERA = Earned run average; SO = Strikeouts

Player	G	IP	W	L	ERA	SO
Steve Trachsel	33	204.2	16	10	3.78	111
Jae Weong Seo	32	188.1	9	12	3.82	110
Tom Glavine	32	183.1	9	14	4.52	82
Al Leiter	30	180.2	15	9	3.99	139
Aaron Heilman	14	65.1	2	7	6.75	51
Pedro Astacio	7	36.2	3	2	7.36	20
David Cone	5	18.0	1	3	6.50	13
Jason Roach	2	9.0	0	2	12.00	2

==== Other pitchers ====
Note: G = Games pitched; IP = Innings pitched; W = Wins; L = Losses; ERA = Earned run average; SO = Strikeouts

Player	G	IP	W	L	ERA	SO
Jeremy Griffiths	9	41.0	1	4	7.02	25
Mike Bacsik	5	17.2	1	2	10.19	12

==== Relief pitchers ====
Note: G = Games pitched; W = Wins; L = Losses; SV = Saves; ERA = Earned run average; SO = Strikeouts

Player	G	W	L	SV	ERA	SO
Armando Benítez	45	3	3	21	3.10	50
David Weathers	77	1	6	7	3.08	75
Mike Stanton	50	2	7	5	4.57	34
John Franco	38	0	3	2	2.62	16
Graeme Lloyd	36	1	2	0	3.31	17
Dan Wheeler	35	1	3	2	3.71	35
Jaime Cerda	27	1	1	0	5.85	19
Pedro Feliciano	23	0	0	0	3.35	43
Scott Strickland	19	0	2	0	2.25	16
Grant Roberts	18	0	3	1	3.79	10
Edwin Almonte	12	0	0	0	11.12	7
Orber Moreno	7	0	0	0	7.88	5
Jason Anderson	6	0	0	0	5.06	7
Pat Strange	6	0	0	0	11.00	5
Jason Middlebrook	5	0	0	0	10.29	3

== Farm system ==
Level	Team	League	Manager
AAA	Norfolk Tides	International League	Bobby Floyd
AA	Binghamton Mets	Eastern League	John Stearns
A	St. Lucie Mets	Florida State League	Ken Oberkfell
A	Capital City Bombers	South Atlantic League	Tony Tijerina
A-Short Season	Brooklyn Cyclones	New York–Penn League	Tim Teufel
Rookie	Kingsport Mets	Appalachian League	Mookie Wilson

LEAGUE CHAMPIONS: St. Lucie
