= 2003 Philadelphia Phillies season =

Major League Baseball season

2003 Philadelphia Phillies
- League: National League
- Division: East
- Ballpark: Veterans Stadium
- City: Philadelphia
- Record: 86–76 (.531)
- Divisional place: 3rd
- Owners: Bill Giles
- General managers: Ed Wade
- Managers: Larry Bowa
- Television: WPSG; CSN Philadelphia
- Radio: WPEN (Harry Kalas, Larry Andersen, Chris Wheeler, Scott Graham, John Kruk)

The 2003 Philadelphia Phillies season was the 121st season in the history of the franchise. The Phillies finished in third place in the National League East, 15 games behind the Atlanta Braves, and five games behind the 2003 World Series champion Florida Marlins, who were the NL's wild-card winner. The Phillies were managed by their former shortstop Larry Bowa, as they played their final season of home games at Veterans Stadium, before moving the club to Citizens Bank Park in 2004.

The Phillies missed the playoffs for the ninth straight season, tying a divisional era (since 1969) record set between 1984 and 1992.

== Offseason ==
- December 2, 2002: David Bell was signed as a free agent with the Philadelphia Phillies.
- December 6, 2002: Jim Thome signed as a free agent with the Philadelphia Phillies.
- December 7, 2002: Dan Plesac was signed as a free agent with the Philadelphia Phillies.
- March 29, 2003: Wayne Gomes was signed as a free agent with the Philadelphia Phillies.

== Regular season ==
=== Season standings ===
==== National League East ====
NL East
Team	W	L	Pct.	GB	Home	Road
Atlanta Braves	101	61	.623	—	55‍–‍26	46‍–‍35
Florida Marlins	91	71	.562	10	53‍–‍28	38‍–‍43
Philadelphia Phillies	86	76	.531	15	49‍–‍32	37‍–‍44
Montreal Expos	83	79	.512	18	52‍–‍29	31‍–‍50
New York Mets	66	95	.410	34½	34‍–‍46	32‍–‍49

==== Record vs. opponents ====
2003 National League record Source: MLB Standings Grid – 2003
Team	AZ	ATL	CHC	CIN	COL	FLA	HOU	LAD	MIL	MON	NYM	PHI	PIT	SD	SF	STL	AL
Arizona	—	2–5	2–4	7–2	10–9	2–5	5–1	10–9	3–3	4–2	4–2	4–2	3–3	9–10	5–14	3–3	11–4
Atlanta	5–2	—	4–2	3–3	6–0	9–10	5–1	4–2	4–2	12–7	11–8	9–10	7–2	6–1	2–4	4–2	10–5
Chicago	4–2	2–4	—	10–7	3–3	4–2	9–7	2–4	10–6	3–3	5–1	1–5	10–8	4–2	4–2	8–9	9–9
Cincinnati	2–7	3–3	7–10	—	4–2	2–4	5–12	2–4	8–10	2–4	2–4	5–4	5–11	3–3	3–3	9–7	7–5
Colorado	9–10	0–6	3–3	2–4	—	4–2	2–4	7–12	5–1	3–4	2–5	2–4	3–6	12–7	7–12	4–2	9–6
Florida	5–2	10–9	2–4	4–2	2–4	—	1–5	2–5	7–2	13–6	12–7	13–6	2–4	5–1	1–5	3–3	9–6
Houston	1–5	1–5	7–9	12–5	4–2	5–1	—	4–2	9–8	3–3	2–4	2–4	10–6	3–3	2–4	11–7	11–7
Los Angeles	9–10	2–4	4–2	4–2	12–7	5–2	2–4	—	4–2	4–2	3–3	2–5	5–1	8–11	6–13	4–2	11–7
Milwaukee	3–3	2–4	6–10	10–8	1–5	2–7	8–9	2–4	—	0–6	6–3	4–2	10–7	5–1	1–5	3–13	5–7
Montreal	2–4	7–12	3–3	4–2	4–3	6–13	3–3	2–4	6–0	—	14–5	8–11	3–3	4–2	7–0	1–5	9–9
New York	2–4	8–11	1–5	4–2	5–2	7–12	4–2	3–3	3–6	5–14	—	7–12	4–2	3–3	4–2	1–5	5–10
Philadelphia	2–4	10–9	5–1	4–5	4–2	6–13	4–2	5–2	2–4	11–8	12–7	—	2–4	4–3	3–3	4–2	8–7
Pittsburgh	3–3	2–7	8–10	11–5	6–3	4–2	6–10	1–5	7–10	3–3	2–4	4–2	—	4–2	2–4	7–10	5–7
San Diego	10–9	1–6	2–4	3–3	7–12	1–5	3–3	11–8	1–5	2–4	3–3	3–4	2–4	—	5–14	2–4	8–10
San Francisco	14–5	4–2	2–4	3–3	12–7	5–1	4–2	13–6	5–1	0–7	2–4	3–3	4–2	14–5	—	5–1	10–8
St. Louis	3–3	2–4	9–8	7–9	2–4	3–3	7–11	2–4	13–3	5–1	5–1	2–4	10–7	4–2	1–5	—	10–8

=== Game log ===
Legend
	Phillies win
	Phillies loss
	Postponement
**Bold**	Phillies team member

2003 Game Log
Overall Record: 86–76
March (1–0)

#	Date	Opponent	Score	Win	Loss	Save	Attendance	Record
1	March 31	@ Marlins	8–5	**Kevin Millwood** (1–0)	Josh Beckett (0–1)	**José Mesa** (1)	37,137	1–0

April (15–12)

#	Date	Opponent	Score	Win	Loss	Save	Attendance	Record
2	April 2	@ Marlins	8–2	**Randy Wolf** (1–0)	Carl Pavano (0–1)	None	10,534	2–0
3	April 3	@ Marlins	3–8	Mark Redman (1–0)	**Vicente Padilla** (0–1)	None	14,585	2–1
4	April 4	Pirates	1–9	Jeff Suppan (1–0)	**Joe Roa** (0–1)	Salomón Torres (1)	59,269	2–2
5	April 5	Pirates	16–1	**Carlos Silva** (1–0)	Jeff D'Amico (0–1)	None	22,693	3–2
6	April 6	Pirates	0–2	Kris Benson (2–0)	**Brett Myers** (0–1)	Mike Williams (3)	30,113	3–3
7	April 8	Braves	4–3 (10)	**José Mesa** (1–0)	Kevin Gryboski (0–1)	None	13,283	4–3
8	April 9	Braves	16–2	**Vicente Padilla** (1–1)	Greg Maddux (0–3)	None	14,724	5–3
9	April 10	Braves	2–6	Darren Holmes (1–0)	**Joe Roa** (0–2)	None	14,840	5–4
10	April 11	@ Reds	6–7	Scott Williamson (2–0)	**José Mesa** (1–1)	None	27,738	5–5
11	April 12	@ Reds	8–5	**Kevin Millwood** (2–0)	Jimmy Haynes (0–3)	None	28,598	6–5
12	April 13	@ Reds	13–1	**Randy Wolf** (2–0)	Ryan Dempster (1–1)	None	24,535	7–5
13	April 14	Marlins	5–2	**Vicente Padilla** (2–1)	A. J. Burnett (0–1)	**José Mesa** (2)	13,611	8–5
14	April 15	Marlins	4–3	**Carlos Silva** (2–0)	Josh Beckett (1–2)	**José Mesa** (3)	17,508	9–5
15	April 16	Marlins	1–3	Brad Penny (2–1)	**Brett Myers** (0–2)	Braden Looper (2)	15,167	9–6
16	April 17	Marlins	3–7	Carl Pavano (2–2)	**Kevin Millwood** (2–1)	None	13,968	9–7
17	April 18	@ Braves	4–5	Kevin Gryboski (1–1)	**Randy Wolf** (2–1)	John Smoltz (6)	28,100	9–8
18	April 19	@ Braves	4–0	**Vicente Padilla** (3–1)	Mike Hampton (0–1)	None	29,777	10–8
19	April 20	@ Braves	1–8	Shane Reynolds (1–0)	**Brandon Duckworth** (0–1)	None	22,978	10–9
20	April 22	Rockies	5–2	**Kevin Millwood** (3–1)	Darren Oliver (0–2)	**José Mesa** (4)	13,431	11–9
21	April 23	Rockies	6–4	**Brett Myers** (1–2)	Jason Jennings (1–3)	**José Mesa** (5)	13,444	12–9
22	April 24	Rockies	9–1	**Randy Wolf** (3–1)	Aaron Cook (1–2)	None	16,947	13–9
23	April 25	Giants	4–7	Joe Nathan (2–0)	**Vicente Padilla** (3–2)	None	20,650	13–10
24	April 26	Giants	10–2	**Brandon Duckworth** (1–1)	Jerome Williams (0–1)	**Carlos Silva** (1)	19,464	14–10
25	April 27	Giants	1–0	**Kevin Millwood** (4–1)	Jesse Foppert (0–2)	None	40,016	15–10
26	April 28	@ Dodgers	3–0	**Brett Myers** (2–2)	Darren Dreifort (1–3)	**José Mesa** (6)	24,241	16–10
27	April 29	@ Dodgers	2–6	Kevin Brown (2–1)	**Randy Wolf** (3–2)	None	27,815	16–11
28	April 30	@ Dodgers	0–4	Odalis Pérez (1–1)	**Vicente Padilla** (3–3)	Éric Gagné (8)	24,940	16–12

May (13–13)

#	Date	Opponent	Score	Win	Loss	Save	Attendance	Record
29	May 1	@ Dodgers	4–1	**Brandon Duckworth** (2–1)	Hideo Nomo (3–4)	**José Mesa** (7)	24,008	17–12
30	May 2	@ Padres	4–5 (10)	Mike Matthews (1–0)	**José Mesa** (1–2)	None	20,595	17–13
31	May 3	@ Padres	5–4 (10)	**Carlos Silva** (3–0)	Jaret Wright (1–4)	**José Mesa** (8)	29,725	18–13
32	May 4	@ Padres	3–1	**Randy Wolf** (4–2)	Adam Eaton (1–3)	**José Mesa** (9)	21,526	19–13
33	May 5	@ Diamondbacks	1–10	Miguel Batista (2–2)	**Vicente Padilla** (3–4)	None	25,407	19–14
34	May 6	@ Diamondbacks	5–6	Óscar Villarreal (3–2)	**Terry Adams** (0–1)	None	32,151	19–15
35	May 7	@ Diamondbacks	5–2	**Kevin Millwood** (5–1)	Brandon Webb (1–1)	**José Mesa** (10)	28,485	20–15
36	May 9	Astros	5–3	**Brett Myers** (3–2)	Roy Oswalt (2–4)	**José Mesa** (11)	20,109	21–15
37	May 10	Astros	2–0	**Randy Wolf** (5–2)	Wade Miller (1–4)	None	20,726	22–15
38	May 11	Astros	7–10	Pete Munro (2–1)	**Vicente Padilla** (3–5)	Billy Wagner (8)	29,054	22–16
39	May 13	Diamondbacks	1–6	Mike Koplove (1–3)	**José Mesa** (1–3)	None	19,016	22–17
40	May 14	Diamondbacks	0–2	Curt Schilling (3–2)	**Brett Myers** (3–3)	None	19,195	22–18
41	May 15	Diamondbacks	6–4	**Rhéal Cormier** (1–0)	Óscar Villarreal (3–3)	**José Mesa** (12)	24,012	23–18
42	May 16	@ Astros	2–4	Octavio Dotel (3–1)	**Turk Wendell** (0–1)	Billy Wagner (10)	28,085	23–19
43	May 17	@ Astros	9–4	**Brandon Duckworth** (3–1)	Nate Bland (1–1)	None	30,289	24–19
44	May 18	@ Astros	3–1	**Kevin Millwood** (6–1)	Tim Redding (3–3)	None	28,585	25–19
45	May 20	@ Mets	11–7	**Brett Myers** (4–3)	Graeme Lloyd (1–1)	None	25,281	26–19
46	May 21	@ Mets	4–5	Armando Benítez (1–3)	**Terry Adams** (0–2)	None	29,551	26–20
47	May 22	@ Mets	3–6	Pedro Astacio (3–1)	**Vicente Padilla** (3–6)	Armando Benítez (13)	20,101	26–21
48	May 23	@ Expos	4–2	**Kevin Millwood** (7–1)	Zach Day (4–2)	**José Mesa** (13)	9,511	27–21
49	May 24	@ Expos	2–3	Luis Ayala (5–1)	**Carlos Silva** (3–1)	None	33,236	27–22
50	May 25	@ Expos	3–5	Javier Vázquez (5–2)	**Brett Myers** (4–4)	Rocky Biddle (14)	17,023	27–23
51	May 27	Mets	2–4	Al Leiter (5–2)	**Randy Wolf** (5–3)	Armando Benítez (15)	18,081	27–24
52	May 28	Mets	11–3	**Vicente Padilla** (4–6)	Pedro Astacio (3–2)	None	21,389	28–24
53	May 29	Mets	0–5	Steve Trachsel (4–2)	**Kevin Millwood** (7–2)	None	19,568	28–25
54	May 30	Expos	12–5	**Rhéal Cormier** (2–0)	Javier Vázquez (5–3)	None	18,311	29–25
–	May 31	Expos	Postponed (rain); Makeup: June 1 as a traditional double-header					

June (16–9)

#	Date	Opponent	Score	Win	Loss	Save	Attendance	Record
55	June 1 (1)	Expos	4–3	**Randy Wolf** (6–3)	Liván Hernández (4–4)	**José Mesa** (14)	see 2nd game	30–25
56	June 1 (2)	Expos	4–1	**Brett Myers** (5–4)	Dan Smith (2–2)	**José Mesa** (15)	36,685	31–25
57	June 3	Mariners	0–4	Jamie Moyer (9–2)	**Kevin Millwood** (7–3)	None	18,029	31–26
58	June 4	Mariners	2–7	Gil Meche (8–2)	**Vicente Padilla** (4–7)	None	16,232	31–27
59	June 5	Mariners	4–5	Julio Mateo (1–0)	**José Mesa** (1–4)	Kazuhiro Sasaki (10)	21,145	31–28
60	June 6	Athletics	4–7	Barry Zito (7–4)	**Brett Myers** (5–5)	None	29,583	31–29
–	June 7	Athletics	Postponed (rain); Makeup: June 8 as a traditional double-header					
61	June 8 (1)	Athletics	7–1	**Kevin Millwood** (8–3)	Mark Mulder (8–4)	None	see 2nd game	32–29
62	June 8 (2)	Athletics	8–3	**Randy Wolf** (7–3)	Aaron Harang (0–1)	None	37,662	33–29
63	June 9	@ Angels	3–0	**Vicente Padilla** (5–7)	Jarrod Washburn (6–6)	**José Mesa** (16)	25,902	34–29
64	June 10	@ Angels	1–2	John Lackey (4–5)	**Brandon Duckworth** (3–2)	Troy Percival (9)	34,037	34–30
65	June 11	@ Angels	3–5	Ben Weber (2–0)	**Brett Myers** (5–6)	Troy Percival (10)	31,130	34–31
66	June 13	@ Reds	1–15	Jimmy Haynes (1–5)	**Kevin Millwood** (8–4)	None	30,144	34–32
67	June 14	@ Reds	12–2	**Randy Wolf** (8–3)	Danny Graves (3–6)	None	35,398	35–32
–	June 15	@ Reds	Postponed (rain); Makeup: July 28					
68	June 17	Braves	5–4	**Turk Wendell** (1–1)	Darren Holmes (1–1)	None	24,133	36–32
69	June 18	Braves	1–6	Russ Ortiz (8–4)	**Kevin Millwood** (8–5)	None	26,475	36–33
70	June 19	Braves	3–2	**José Mesa** (2–4)	John Smoltz (0–1)	None	27,207	37–33
–	June 20	Red Sox	Postponed (rain); Makeup: September 1					
71	June 21	Red Sox	6–5 (13)	**José Mesa** (3–4)	Rudy Seánez (0–1)	None	35,512	38–33
72	June 22	Red Sox	5–0	**Brett Myers** (6–6)	Byung-hyun Kim (2–6)	None	60,960	39–33
73	June 24	@ Braves	3–5	Russ Ortiz (9–4)	**Kevin Millwood** (8–6)	John Smoltz (28)	31,796	39–34
74	June 25	@ Braves	8–1	**Vicente Padilla** (6–7)	Greg Maddux (6–7)	None	31,724	40–34
75	June 26	@ Braves	8–1	**Randy Wolf** (9–3)	Mike Hampton (3–4)	None	30,405	41–34
76	June 27	@ Orioles	4–2 (17)	**Dan Plesac** (1–0)	Omar Daal (4–10)	**Héctor Mercado** (1)	46,405	42–34
77	June 28	@ Orioles	9–5	**Brett Myers** (7–6)	Pat Hentgen (1–5)	None	49,549	43–34
78	June 29	@ Orioles	4–3	**Kevin Millwood** (9–6)	Rick Helling (5–6)	**José Mesa** (17)	44,723	44–34
79	June 30	Cubs	4–3	**Vicente Padilla** (7–7)	Shawn Estes (6–7)	**José Mesa** (18)	23,323	45–34

July (15–13)

#	Date	Opponent	Score	Win	Loss	Save	Attendance	Record
80	July 1	Cubs	4–3	**Terry Adams** (1–2)	Mike Remlinger (4–2)	None	25,307	46–34
81	July 2	Cubs	0–1	Kyle Farnsworth (3–0)	**Turk Wendell** (1–2)	Joe Borowski (16)	23,591	46–35
82	July 3	Cubs	12–2	**Brett Myers** (8–6)	Carlos Zambrano (6–7)	None	57,326	47–35
83	July 4	Marlins	1–2	Braden Looper (4–2)	**José Mesa** (3–5)	None	19,690	47–36
84	July 5	Marlins	4–5	Brad Penny (7–6)	**Vicente Padilla** (7–8)	Braden Looper (15)	52,110	47–37
85	July 6	Marlins	3–6	Mark Redman (7–3)	**Randy Wolf** (9–4)	None	26,244	47–38
86	July 7	@ Expos	1–8	Liván Hernández (8–6)	**Brandon Duckworth** (3–3)	None	7,099	47–39
87	July 8	@ Expos	13–6	**Brett Myers** (9–6)	Claudio Vargas (6–4)	None	8,225	48–39
88	July 9	@ Expos	2–0	**Kevin Millwood** (10–6)	Tomo Ohka (7–9)	None	7,005	49–39
89	July 10	@ Mets	7–2	**Vicente Padilla** (8–8)	Steve Trachsel (8–6)	None	25,913	50–39
90	July 11	@ Mets	10–3	**Randy Wolf** (10–4)	Aaron Heilman (0–2)	None	35,884	51–39
91	July 12	@ Mets	4–2 (11)	**José Mesa** (4–5)	John Franco (0–1)	None	33,452	52–39
92	July 13	@ Mets	3–4	Armando Benítez (3–3)	**Terry Adams** (1–3)	None	31,630	52–40
–	July 15	**2003 Major League Baseball All-Star Game at U.S. Cellular Field in Chicago**						
93	July 17	Expos	5–2 (11)	**Dan Plesac** (2–0)	Tim Drew (0–2)	None	23,874	53–40
94	July 18	Expos	1–3	Javier Vázquez (7–6)	**Randy Wolf** (10–5)	None	22,789	53–41
95	July 19	Expos	4–3 (11)	**José Mesa** (5–5)	Héctor Almonte (0–2)	None	28,794	54–41
96	July 20	Expos	3–2	**Brett Myers** (10–6)	Claudio Vargas (6–6)	**José Mesa** (19)	37,552	55–41
97	July 21	Mets	6–8	Aaron Heilman (1–2)	**Brandon Duckworth** (3–4)	John Franco (1)	33,208	55–42
98	July 22	Mets	5–7	Steve Trachsel (9–6)	**Kevin Millwood** (10–7)	Dan Wheeler (2)	37,164	55–43
99	July 23	@ Cubs	3–0	**Randy Wolf** (11–5)	Matt Clement (7–9)	None	40,377	56–43
100	July 24	@ Cubs	14–6	**Vicente Padilla** (9–8)	Kerry Wood (10–7)	None	40,266	57–43
101	July 25	@ Marlins	5–11	Ugueth Urbina (1–4)	**Mike Williams** (1–4)	None	18,106	57–44
102	July 26	@ Marlins	5–10	Josh Beckett (5–4)	**Brandon Duckworth** (3–5)	Braden Looper (18)	20,545	57–45
103	July 27	@ Marlins	6–7	Ugueth Urbina (2–4)	**Mike Williams** (1–5)	None	12,467	57–46
104	July 28	@ Reds	5–6 (10)	Scott Williamson (5–3)	**Terry Adams** (1–4)	None	29,200	57–47
105	July 29	Dodgers	2–0	**Vicente Padilla** (10–8)	Kaz Ishii (9–5)	**José Mesa** (20)	31,099	58–47
106	July 30	Dodgers	4–2	**Turk Wendell** (2–2)	Paul Shuey (4–3)	**José Mesa** (21)	26,580	59–47
107	July 31	Dodgers	7–3	**Brandon Duckworth** (4–5)	Odalis Pérez (6–9)	None	24,932	60–47

August (13–16)

#	Date	Opponent	Score	Win	Loss	Save	Attendance	Record
108	August 1	Padres	6–0	**Kevin Millwood** (11–7)	Kevin Jarvis (4–3)	None	18,655	61–47
109	August 2 (1)	Padres	4–6	Jake Peavy (9–8)	**Randy Wolf** (11–6)	None	see 2nd game	61–48
110	August 2 (2)	Padres	10–4	**Rhéal Cormier** (3–0)	Joe Roa (1–3)	None	35,239	62–48
111	August 3	Padres	2–5 (10)	Jay Witasick (3–2)	**José Mesa** (5–6)	Rod Beck (15)	43,839	62–49
112	August 5	@ Rockies	7–2	**Brett Myers** (11–6)	Shawn Chacón (11–6)	None	28,034	63–49
113	August 6	@ Rockies	1–5	Chin-hui Tsao (2–0)	**Brandon Duckworth** (4–6)	None	27,599	63–50
114	August 7	@ Rockies	3–4	Javier López (3–1)	**Kevin Millwood** (11–8)	Justin Speier (7)	27,855	63–51
115	August 8	@ Giants	1–9	Jesse Foppert (8–8)	**Randy Wolf** (11–7)	None	42,595	63–52
116	August 9	@ Giants	8–6 (10)	**Turk Wendell** (3–2)	Jim Brower (7–4)	None	42,572	64–52
117	August 10	@ Giants	2–5	Kevin Correia (1–0)	**Brett Myers** (11–7)	None	42,520	64–53
118	August 12	Brewers	3–6	Wayne Franklin (8–9)	**Brandon Duckworth** (4–7)	Dan Kolb (7)	23,136	64–54
119	August 13	Brewers	11–4	**Kevin Millwood** (12–8)	Ben Sheets (10–10)	None	24,683	65–54
120	August 14	Brewers	4–3	**Randy Wolf** (12–7)	Wes Obermueller (0–4)	**Mike Williams** (26)	23,394	66–54
121	August 15	Cardinals	7–4	**Vicente Padilla** (11–8)	Woody Williams (14–6)	**Dan Plesac** (1)	28,962	67–54
122	August 16	Cardinals	5–4	**Brett Myers** (12–7)	Dan Haren (3–4)	**José Mesa** (22)	35,046	68–54
123	August 17	Cardinals	6–4	**Amaury Telemaco** (1–0)	Brett Tomko (9–8)	**Mike Williams** (27)	42,153	69–54
124	August 19	@ Brewers	4–6	Mike DeJean (4–7)	**Turk Wendell** (3–3)	Dan Kolb (9)	17,028	69–55
125	August 20	@ Brewers	1–10	Matt Kinney (8–9)	**Randy Wolf** (12–8)	None	18,115	69–56
126	August 21	@ Brewers	2–5	Leo Estrella (4–2)	**Vicente Padilla** (11–9)	Dan Kolb (10)	19,885	69–57
127	August 22	@ Cardinals	9–4	**Rhéal Cormier** (4–0)	Steve Kline (4–5)	None	33,824	70–57
128	August 23	@ Cardinals	3–5	Sterling Hitchcock (2–3)	**Amaury Telemaco** (1–1)	Jason Isringhausen (14)	37,318	70–58
129	August 24	@ Cardinals	0–3	Brett Tomko (10–8)	**Kevin Millwood** (12–9)	Mike DeJean (19)	37,679	70–59
130	August 25	@ Expos	1–12	Liván Hernández (14–7)	**Randy Wolf** (12–9)	None	30,501	70–60
131	August 26	@ Expos	10–14	Joey Eischen (2–2)	**Mike Williams** (1–6)	Luis Ayala (4)	12,509	70–61
132	August 27	@ Expos	6–9	Héctor Almonte (1–2)	**Dan Plesac** (2–1)	Rocky Biddle (31)	20,105	70–62
133	August 28	@ Expos	0–4	Javier Vázquez (12–8)	**Amaury Telemaco** (1–2)	None	20,030	70–63
134	August 29	@ Mets	7–0	**Kevin Millwood** (13–9)	Steve Trachsel (13–8)	None	33,208	71–63
135	August 30	@ Mets	4–2	**Randy Wolf** (13–9)	Tom Glavine (9–12)	**José Mesa** (23)	26,769	72–63
136	August 31	@ Mets	4–1	**Vicente Padilla** (12–9)	Jae Weong Seo (8–9)	**José Mesa** (24)	26,180	73–63

September (13–13)

#	Date	Opponent	Score	Win	Loss	Save	Attendance	Record
137	September 1	Red Sox	9–13	Byung-hyun Kim (7–9)	**José Mesa** (5–7)	None	61,068	73–64
138	September 2	Expos	5–3	**Rhéal Cormier** (5–0)	Javier Vázquez (12–9)	**Dan Plesac** (2)	26,719	74–64
139	September 3	Expos	8–3	**Kevin Millwood** (14–9)	T. J. Tucker (0–2)	None	18,002	75–64
140	September 4	Mets	6–5	**Valerio De Los Santos** (4–3)	Mike Stanton (2–6)	None	19,259	76–64
141	September 5	Mets	1–0	**Vicente Padilla** (13–9)	Jae Weong Seo (8–10)	**Rhéal Cormier** (1)	26,712	77–64
142	September 6	Mets	9–6	**Brett Myers** (13–7)	Jeremy Griffiths (1–2)	**Turk Wendell** (1)	38,671	78–64
143	September 7	Mets	5–4 (11)	**Rhéal Cormier** (6–0)	Dan Wheeler (1–3)	None	29,159	79–64
144	September 8	@ Braves	4–6	Russ Ortiz (19–6)	**Kevin Millwood** (14–10)	Will Cunnane (2)	17,543	79–65
145	September 9	@ Braves	18–5	**Randy Wolf** (14–9)	Shane Reynolds (11–9)	None	21,257	80–65
146	September 10	@ Braves	2–4	Horacio Ramírez (10–4)	**Vicente Padilla** (13–10)	Will Cunnane (3)	21,321	80–66
147	September 11	@ Braves	8–3	**Brett Myers** (14–7)	Greg Maddux (14–11)	None	23,811	81–66
148	September 12	@ Pirates	4–8	Kip Wells (8–8)	**Amaury Telemaco** (1–3)	None	18,895	81–67
149	September 13	@ Pirates	3–5	Josh Fogg (10–8)	**Kevin Millwood** (14–11)	Julián Tavárez (7)	33,480	81–68
150	September 14	@ Pirates	10–7	**Randy Wolf** (15–9)	Salomón Torres (5–5)	**Mike Williams** (28)	16,383	82–68
151	September 16	Marlins	14–0	**Vicente Padilla** (14–10)	Carl Pavano (11–12)	None	36,479	83–68
152	September 17	Marlins	4–11	Mark Redman (13–9)	**Brett Myers** (14–8)	None	33,761	83–69
153	September 18	Marlins	5–4	**Rhéal Cormier** (7–0)	Chad Fox (3–3)	None	20,950	84–69
154	September 19	Reds	7–3	**Randy Wolf** (16–9)	Josh Hall (0–1)	None	30,191	85–69
155	September 20	Reds	0–2	Todd Van Poppel (2–1)	**Amaury Telemaco** (1–4)	Chris Reitsma (10)	35,239	85–70
156	September 21	Reds	3–4	Dan Serafini (1–3)	**Vicente Padilla** (14–11)	Chris Reitsma (11)	57,883	85–71
157	September 23	@ Marlins	4–5	Michael Tejera (3–3)	**Mike Williams** (1–7)	Ugueth Urbina (30)	25,311	85–72
158	September 24	@ Marlins	5–6	Josh Beckett (9–8)	**Brett Myers** (14–9)	Ugueth Urbina (31)	28,520	85–73
159	September 25	@ Marlins	4–8	Brad Penny (14–10)	**Randy Wolf** (16–10)	None	31,935	85–74
160	September 26	Braves	0–6	Horacio Ramírez (12–4)	**Vicente Padilla** (14–12)	None	58,096	85–75
161	September 27	Braves	7–6 (10)	**Rhéal Cormier** (8–0)	Ray King (3–4)	None	58,303	86–75
162	September 28	Braves	2–5	Greg Maddux (16–11)	**Kevin Millwood** (14–12)	Jason Marquis (1)	58,554	86–76

=== Roster ===
2003 Philadelphia Phillies
**Roster**
**Pitchers**: 51 Terry Adams; 37 Rhéal Cormier; 28 Valerio de los Santos; 31 Brandon Duckworth; 56 Geoff Geary; 50 Josh Hancock; 28 Eric Junge; 57 Ryan Madson; 54 Héctor Mercado; 49 José Mesa; 34 Kevin Millwood; 39 Brett Myers; 44 Vicente Padilla; 19 Dan Plesac; 35 Joe Roa; 52 Carlos Silva; 47 Amaury Telemaco; 13 Turk Wendell; 41 Mike Williams; 43 Randy Wolf	**Catchers**: 24 Mike Lieberthal; 3 Todd Pratt; 35 Kelly Stinnett; **Infielders**: 4 David Bell; 23 Travis Chapman; 2 Tyler Houston; 9 Tomás Pérez; 27 Plácido Polanco; 8 Nick Punto; 6 Jimmy Rollins; 25 Jim Thome; 26 Chase Utley	**Outfielders**: 53 Bobby Abreu; 5 Pat Burrell; 29 Marlon Byrd; 33 Ricky Ledée; 22 Jason Michaels; **Other batters**: 12 Anderson Machado	**Manager**: 10 Larry Bowa; **Coaches**: 21 Greg Gross (hitting); 59 Ramon Henderson (bullpen); 45 Joe Kerrigan (pitching); 30 Tony Scott (first base); 25 Gary Varsho (bench); 18 John Vukovich (third base)

== Player stats ==
=== Batting ===
Note: G = Games played; AB = At bats; H = Hits; Avg. = Batting average; HR = Home runs; RBI = Runs batted in

Player	G	AB	H	Avg.	HR	RBI
Bobby Abreu	158	577	173	.300	20	101
David Bell	85	297	58	.195	4	37
Pat Burrell	146	522	109	.209	21	64
Marlon Byrd	135	495	150	.303	7	45
Travis Chapman	1	1	0	.000	0	0
Tyler Houston	54	97	27	.278	2	14
Ricky Ledée	121	255	63	.247	13	46
Mike Lieberthal	131	508	159	.313	13	81
Anderson Machado	1	0	0	----	0	0
Jason Michaels	76	109	36	.330	5	17
Tomás Pérez	125	298	79	.265	5	33
Placido Polanco	122	492	142	.289	14	63
Todd Pratt	43	125	34	.272	4	20
Nick Punto	64	92	20	.217	1	4
Jimmy Rollins	156	628	165	.263	8	62
Kelly Stinnett	7	7	3	.429	0	0
Jim Thome	159	578	154	.266	47	131
Chase Utley	43	134	32	.239	2	21
Pitcher totals	162	328	44	.134	0	18
Team totals	162	5543	1448	.261	166	757

=== Starting pitchers ===
Note: G = Games pitched; IP = Innings pitched; W = Wins; L = Losses; ERA = Earned run average; SO = Strikeouts

Player	G	IP	W	L	ERA	S0
Kevin Millwood	35	222.0	14	12	4.01	169
Brett Myers	32	193.0	14	9	4.43	143
Vincente Padilla	32	208.2	14	12	3.62	133
Randy Wolf	33	200.0	16	10	4.23	177
Amaury Telemaco	8	45.1	1	4	3.97	29

=== Other pitchers ===
Note: G = Games pitched; IP = Innings pitched; W = Wins; L = Losses; ERA = Earned run average; SO = Strikeouts

Player	G	IP	W	L	ERA	SO
Brandon Duckworth	24	93.0	4	7	4.94	68
Joe Roa	6	19.1	0	2	6.05	16

=== Relief pitchers ===
Note: G = Games pitched; IP = Innings pitched; W = Wins; L = Losses; SV = Saves; ERA = Earned run average: SO = Strikeouts

Player	G	IP	W	L	SV	ERA	SO
Terry Adams	66	68.0	1	4	0	2.65	51
Rhéal Cormier	65	84.2	8	0	1	1.70	67
Valerio De Los Santos	6	4.0	1	0	0	9.00	4
Geoff Geary	5	6.0	0	0	0	4.50	3
Josh Hancock	2	3.0	0	0	0	3.00	4
Eric Junge	6	7.2	0	0	0	3.52	5
Ryan Madson	1	2.0	0	0	0	0.00	0
Héctor Mercado	13	18.2	0	0	1	5.79	15
José Mesa	61	58.0	5	7	24	6.52	45
Dan Plesac	58	33.1	2	1	2	2.70	37
Carlos Silva	62	87.1	3	1	1	4.43	48
Turk Wendell	56	64.0	3	3	1	3.38	27
Mike Williams	28	25.2	0	4	3	5.96	19
Team Pitching Totals	162	1443.2	86	76	33	4.04	1060

== Farm system ==
Level	Team	League	Manager
AAA	Scranton/Wilkes-Barre; Red Barons	International League	Marc Bombard
AA	Reading Phillies	Eastern League	Greg Legg
A	Clearwater Phillies	Florida State League	Roly de Armas
A	Lakewood BlueClaws	South Atlantic League	Buddy Biancalana
A-Short Season	Batavia Muckdogs	New York–Penn League	Luis Meléndez
Rookie	GCL Phillies	Gulf Coast League	Rubén Amaro, Sr.
