= Anthony Ferrari =

American baseball player (born 1978)

- Pitcher
- Born: June 22, 1978 (age 47); San Francisco
- Batted: Left Threw: Left

MLB debut
- June 7, 2003, for the Montreal Expos

Last MLB appearance
- June 18, 2003, for the Montreal Expos

MLB statistics
- Win–loss record: 0–0
- Earned run average: 6.75
- Strikeouts: 1
- Stats at Baseball Reference

Teams
- Montreal Expos (2003)

Anthony Michael Ferrari (born June 22, 1978) is a former Major League Baseball player. A pitcher, Ferrari appeared in four games for the Montreal Expos in 2003.

Ferrari attended Redwood High School (Larkspur, California) and Lewis-Clark State College. He was drafted by the Expos in the 44th round of the 2000 Major League Baseball draft. After three years in the minors, he made his major league debut on June 7, 2003. He spent just twelve days in the majors before being sent back down on June 18.

After his brief term in the majors, Ferrari played in the minors for several more years. He most recently pitched for the Camden Riversharks of the Atlantic League in 2007.
