= Bryan Hebson =

American baseball player (born 1976)

- Pitcher
- Born: March 12, 1976 (age 49); Columbus, Georgia, U.S.
- Batted: Right Threw: Right

MLB debut
- July 6, 2003, for the Montreal Expos

Last MLB appearance
- July 8, 2003, for the Montreal Expos

MLB statistics
- Win–loss record: 0–0
- Earned run average: 13.50
- Strikeouts: 1
- Stats at Baseball Reference

Teams
- Montreal Expos (2003)

Bryan McCall Hebson (born March 12, 1976) is an American former Major League Baseball pitcher who played in 2003 with the Montreal Expos.

Hebson attended Central High School in Phenix City, Alabama and initially committed to play college baseball at Tallahassee Community College. However, before his senior season, he reached out to Auburn University and asked that their baseball coaches watch him pitch. That year, he finished with a 1.54 earned run average and led his school to the state finals. In June, he accepted a scholarship to play for the Auburn Tigers baseball team.

In July 2003, he reached the majors for the first time after Expos pitcher Dan Smith was placed on the disabled list with an injury to his rotator cuff.
