= Danny Garcia (second baseman) =

American baseball player (born 1980)

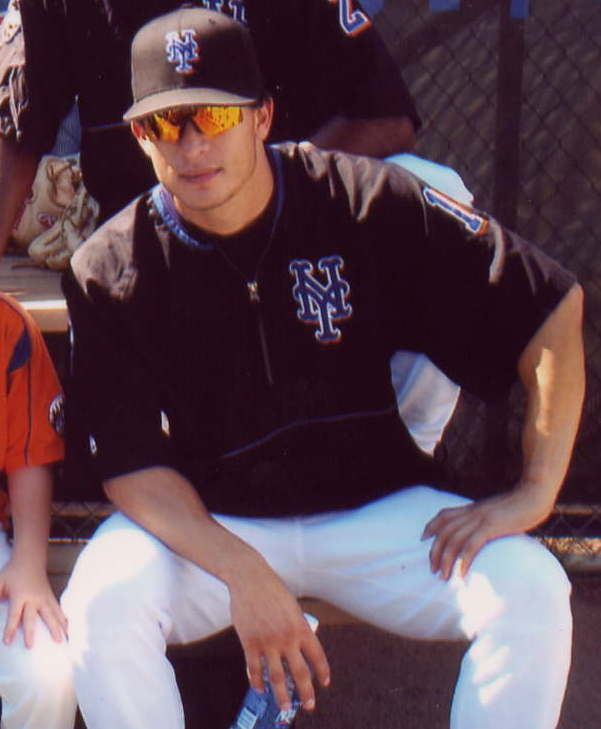
- Garcia at Shea Stadium in 2004
- Second baseman
- Born: April 12, 1980 (age 46); Riverside, California, U.S.
- Batted: Right Threw: Right

MLB debut
- September 2, 2003, for the New York Mets

Last MLB appearance
- October 3, 2004, for the New York Mets

MLB statistics
- Batting average: .227
- Home runs: 5
- Runs batted in: 23
- Stats at Baseball Reference

Teams
- New York Mets (2003–2004)

Daniel Joseph Garcia (born April 12, 1980) is a retired Major League Baseball second baseman who played for the New York Mets in 2003 and 2004.

In 2006, with the New York Yankees Triple-A affiliate, the Columbus Clippers, Garcia hit .242, with 3 home runs, and 39 RBI. In 2007, playing for the Somerset Patriots of the independent Atlantic League, Garcia hit .273 and stole 39 bases which led the league. Garcia currently resides in Florida with his family.
