= Joe DePastino =

American baseball player (born 1973)

- Catcher
- Born: September 4, 1973; Philadelphia, Pennsylvania, U.S.
- Batted: Right Threw: Right

MLB debut
- August 5, 2003, for the New York Mets

Last MLB appearance
- August 6, 2003, for the New York Mets

MLB statistics
- Batting average: .000
- Games Played: 2
- At Bats: 2

Teams
- New York Mets (2003)

Joseph Bernard DePastino (born September 4, 1973) is an American professional baseball player. A catcher, DePastino made his Major League Baseball debut in 2003 for the New York Mets.

DePastino played baseball and attended Riverview High School.

After spending over 10 years in the minor leagues as a journeyman catcher, DePastino was called up to the Mets in early August 2003 due to injuries. He made his Major League debut on August 5, pinch-hitting and striking out against the Houston Astros. He only lasted one more at-bat the following day against Houston before being sent down. He retired in 2005.

DePastino served as manager for the Detroit Tigers' Class A affiliate, West Michigan Whitecaps of the Midwest League, from 2008-2010. He is currently serving as the Tigers minor league-wide roving catching coordinator. He also has 2 kids Gia and Rocco depastino who both play softball or baseball.
