= Ron Calloway =

American baseball player (born 1976)

- Outfielder
- Born: September 4, 1976 (age 48); San Jose, California, U.S.
- Batted: Left Threw: Left

MLB debut
- March 31, 2003, for the Montreal Expos

Last MLB appearance
- August 26, 2004, for the Montreal Expos

MLB statistics
- Batting average: .224
- Home runs: 10
- Runs batted in: 62
- Stats at Baseball Reference

Teams
- Montreal Expos (2003–2004)

Ronald Isiah Calloway (born September 4, 1976) is an American former baseball outfielder who played two seasons in Major League Baseball with the Montreal Expos. He batted and threw left-handed.

== Career ==
Calloway was selected in the eighth round of the 1997 draft by the Arizona Diamondbacks. He played in the Major Leagues for the Montreal Expos from 2003 to 2004. Calloway spent the 2005 season with the Norfolk Tides, the Triple-A affiliate of the New York Mets and 2006 for the Pawtucket Red Sox, the Triple-A affiliate of the Boston Red Sox. Prior to the 2007 season, he signed a minor league contract with the Philadelphia Phillies and was assigned to their Triple-A affiliate, the Ottawa Lynx. On May 18, 2007, Calloway announced his retirement.

Calloway attended James Lick High School and graduated in 1994.
