= Jason Roach (baseball) =

American baseball player (born 1976)

- Starting pitcher
- Born: April 20, 1976 (age 49); Kinston, North Carolina, U.S.
- Batted: Right Threw: Right

MLB debut
- June 14, 2003, for the New York Mets

Last MLB appearance
- July 8, 2003, for the New York Mets

MLB statistics
- Win–loss record: 0–2
- Earned run average: 12.00
- Strikeouts: 2
- Stats at Baseball Reference

Teams
- New York Mets (2003)

Jason Glenn Roach (born April 20, 1976) is a former Major League Baseball starting pitcher. He batted and threw right-handed.

Roach graduated from North Lenoir High School before attending UNC Wilmington. He was drafted by the New York Mets in the 20th round of the 1997 Major League Baseball draft. He was primarily a third baseman until spring training in 2000, at which point the Mets converted him to pitching, believing it would give him a quicker route to the majors. He played in 2003 with the Mets, wearing #57. He had a 0-2 record in 2 games, with a 12.00 ERA.

Singles in his only two at-bats left Roach with a rare MLB career batting average of 1.000.
