= Edwards Guzmán =

Puerto Rican baseball player (born 1976)

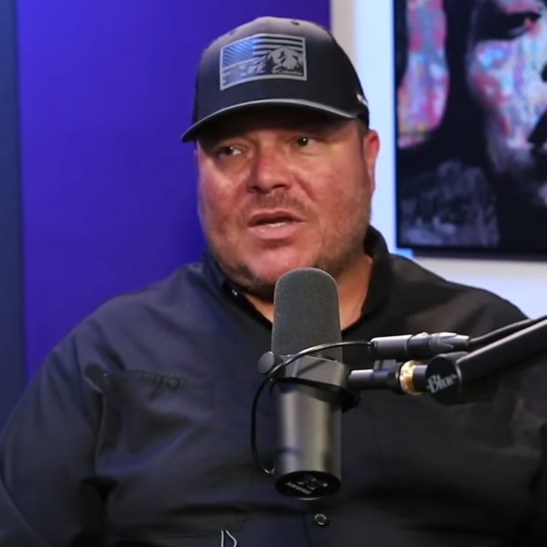
- Guzmán in 2024
- Catcher / Third baseman
- Born: September 11, 1976 (age 50); Bayamón, Puerto Rico
- Batted: Left Threw: Right

MLB debut
- April 6, 1999, for the San Francisco Giants

Last MLB appearance
- September 28, 2003, for the Montreal Expos

MLB statistics
- Batting average: .228
- Home runs: 4
- Runs batted in: 21
- Stats at Baseball Reference

Teams
- San Francisco Giants (1999, 2001); Montreal Expos (2003)

Edwards Guzmán (born September 11, 1976) is a Puerto Rican former Major League Baseball player who is currently the manager in the Puerto Rico Baseball League for the Gigantes de Carolina. He also serves as a scout for the Chicago Cubs.

A catcher and infielder, Guzmán played for the San Francisco Giants and Montreal Expos.
