= Grant Roberts =

American baseball player (born 1977)

- Relief pitcher
- Born: September 13, 1977 (age 48); El Cajon, California, U.S.
- Batted: Right Threw: Right

MLB debut
- July 27, 2000, for the New York Mets

Last MLB appearance
- April 18, 2004, for the New York Mets

MLB statistics
- Win–loss record: 4–4
- Earned run average: 4.25
- Strikeouts: 77
- Stats at Baseball Reference

Teams
- New York Mets (2000–2004)

Grant William Roberts (born September 13, 1977) is a former pitcher in Major League Baseball. A right-handed relief pitcher, Roberts pitched for the New York Mets from 2000 to 2004. His career was derailed by injuries and a 2005 violation of baseball's steroid policy.

== Early life and career ==
Roberts graduated from Grossmont High School in El Cajon, California. He was selected by the Mets in the 11th round of the Major League Baseball draft and the 17-year-old signed on June 1, 1995. Roberts pitched mostly out of the bullpen in 1995, but was a starting pitcher in 1996, posting a 9-1 record and 2.10 earned run average.

With the Single-A Capital City Bombers, Roberts again pitched well and played in the 1997 South Atlantic League All-star game. After an 11-3 record, 2.36 ERA and 8.47 strikeouts per 9 innings pitched, Roberts was named the league's Most Outstanding Pitcher. In 1998, Roberts' numbers declined with the St. Lucie Mets and he had elbow surgery in November. He returned from surgery with mediocre numbers in 1999 for both the Double-A Binghamton Mets and Triple-A Norfolk Tides.

In 2000, Roberts' pitching improved for Norfolk and he was selected to the All-Star Futures Game. On July 27, 2000, with the Mets holding a slight lead in the National League wild card race, Roberts made his major league debut with a terrible start against the Montreal Expos, getting knocked out in the second inning. After what turned out to be the only start of his major league career, Roberts was sent back to the minors until September. When he returned, the Mets were comfortably in the wild card lead and Roberts was in the bullpen for three appearances, highlighted by a four-inning one-hit performance on the last day of the season. Roberts did not pitch in the postseason.

When 2001 started, Roberts was back in Norfolk and back to pitching mostly in relief, despite having spent most of his minor league career as a starter. The Mets brought him back up for a very good relief appearance in June and Roberts spent all of August and September in the majors.

== Highlight year interrupted ==
2002 was the highlight of Roberts' career. He made the majors out of spring training and did not give up a single run until his eighth game. He ended April with a 0.69 ERA including his most dominant game on April 15 when he struck out five of the seven batters he faced over two innings pitched. In early June, his ERA dipped to a league-low 0.59, but after surrendering 3 earned runs in one inning on June 8, he was placed on the disabled list with a rotator cuff problem. He returned a few weeks later, but was back on the disabled list with tendinitis after only five games.

Roberts was out of action for two months until mid-September. Shortly after, Newsday published a story that seven Mets players, including Roberts, had used marijuana during the season and included a 1998 photograph of Roberts smoking marijuana. Roberts alleged that a former girlfriend made the photograph public after unsuccessfully trying to extort money from him. In 2003, the Queens district attorney decided not to press charges on the woman.

Continuing problems with his rotator cuff caused Roberts to start the 2003 season on the disabled list. In May, he was moved to the 60-day disabled list and he did not pitch until August. After the season, the Mets cleared Roberts for surgery, but he declined. During spring training of 2004, Roberts was a leading candidate to be the fifth starter, but he began the season in the bullpen after a poor last start. In April 2004, Roberts had an ERA of 17.36 in four relief appearances before returning to the disabled list. In mid-May, Roberts was within minutes of having shoulder surgery when the Mets designated him for assignment cancelling the procedure. The team relented later in the month and Roberts had surgery ending his season. Roberts was granted free agency after the season, but re-signed to a minor league contract with the Mets.

Roberts did not make the team after spring training 2005 and was released on April 14. On April 22, Roberts and eight other players were suspended for violating baseball's minor league steroids policy. Among the players suspended, Roberts was the only one with major league experience. He was suspended for 15 days which was standard for a first offense at the time.

On May 26, 2005, Roberts was signed by the New York Yankees, but he was released on August 22 without pitching in the majors.

== See also ==
- List of sportspeople sanctioned for doping offences
