= Héctor Almonte =

Dominican baseball player (born 1975)

- Pitcher
- Born: October 17, 1975 (age 50); Santo Domingo, Dominican Republic
- Batted: Right Threw: Right

Professional debut
- MLB: July 26, 1999, for the Florida Marlins
- NPB: July 1, 2001, for the Yomiuri Giants
- CPBL: August 1, 2008, for the dmedia T-REX

Last appearance
- NPB: October 4, 2002, for the Yomiuri Giants
- MLB: September 28, 2003, for the Montreal Expos
- CPBL: September 21, 2008, for the dmedia T-REX

MLB statistics
- Win–loss record: 1–4
- Earned run average: 6.27
- Strikeouts: 40

NPB statistics
- Win–loss record: 0–1
- Earned run average: 2.28
- Strikeouts: 23

CPBL statistics
- Win–loss record: 0–0
- Earned run average: 2.61
- Strikeouts: 13
- Stats at Baseball Reference

Teams
- Florida Marlins (1999); Yomiuri Giants (2001–2002); Boston Red Sox (2003); Montreal Expos (2003); dmedia T-REX (2008)

Héctor Almonte (born October 17, 1975) is a Dominican former relief pitcher in Major League Baseball. From 1999 through 2003, Almonte played for the Florida Marlins (1999), Boston Red Sox (2003) and Montreal Expos (2003). He bats and throws right-handed.

== Baseball career ==
Almonte played for two seasons with the Yomiuri Giants in Japan from 2001–2002. In 2005, he pitched in the Atlanta Braves organization and finished the season with Saraperos de Saltillo (Saltillo Sarape Makers) in the Triple-A Mexican League with a 2–0 record and a 1.54 ERA in ten games pitched. From 2006–2007, Almonte played for the Atlantic League's Somerset Patriots in Bridgewater, New Jersey and also had a brief stint with the Chicago Cubs Triple-A affiliate. In 2008, he played for the Atlantic League's Southern Maryland Blue Crabs. He signed to play with the Edmonton Capitals of the Golden Baseball League in 2009 and appeared in two games with them.

== Personal life ==
His brother, Erick Almonte, is a former player for the New York Yankees and manager of the Peoria Chiefs.
