= Julio Mañón =

Dominican baseball player (born 1973)

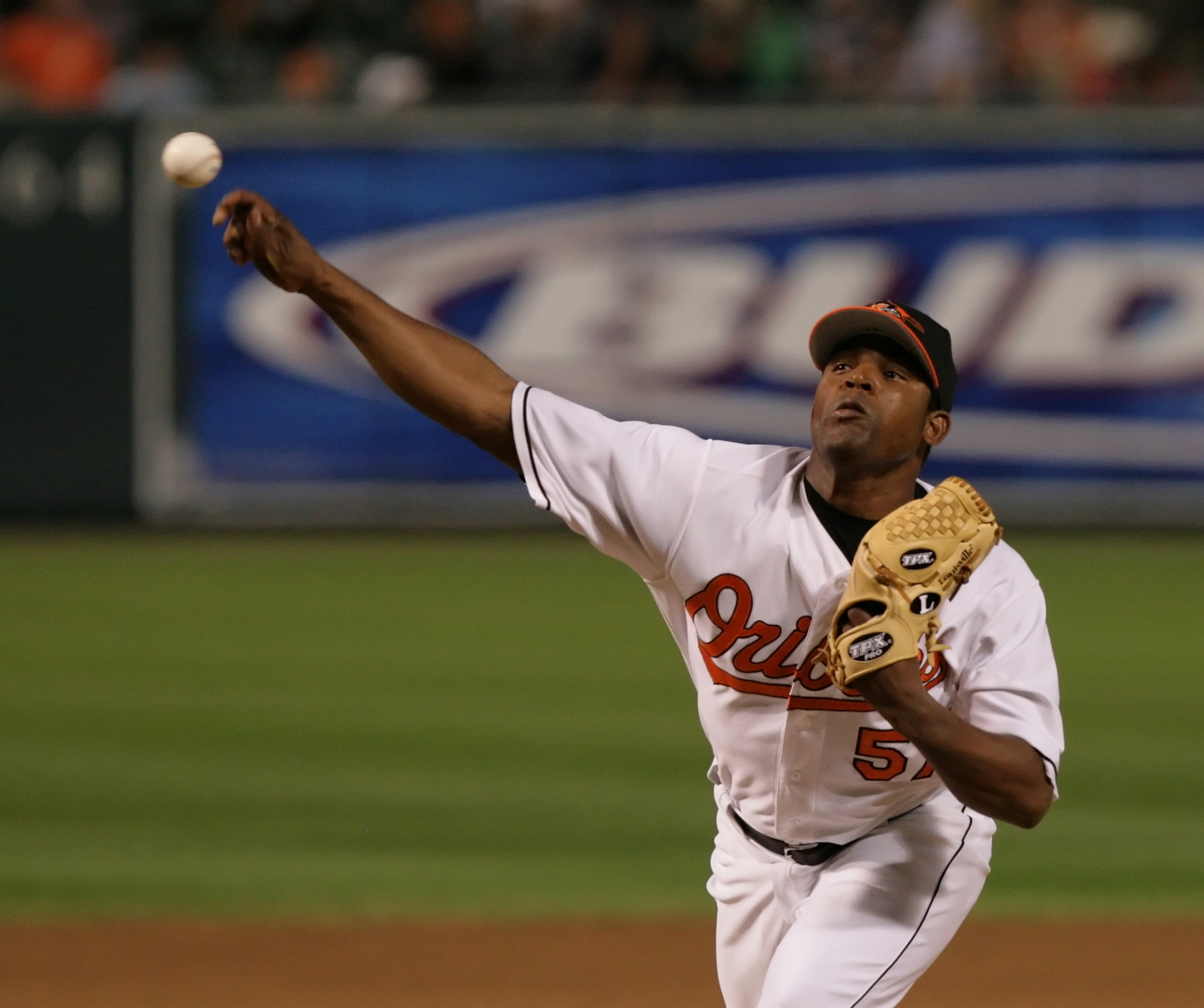
- Relief pitcher
- Born: June 10, 1973 (age 52); San Antonio de Guerra, Dominican Republic
- Batted: Right Threw: Right

MLB debut
- June 5, 2003, for the Montreal Expos

Last MLB appearance
- October 1, 2006, for the Baltimore Orioles

MLB statistics
- Win–loss record: 1–3
- Earned run average: 4.66
- Strikeouts: 37

KBO statistics
- Win–loss record: 8–9
- Earned run average: 4.17
- Strikeouts: 83

CPBL statistics
- Win–loss record: 0–2
- Earned run average: 3.66
- Strikeouts: 15
- Stats at Baseball Reference

Teams
- Montreal Expos (2003); Kia Tigers (2004); Uni-President Lions (2005); Baltimore Orioles (2006)

Julio Alberto Mañón [mah'-nion] (born June 10, 1973) is a Dominican former professional baseball relief pitcher.

== Career ==
=== Starting from the Dominican ===
Mañón was originally signed as an undrafted free agent by the St. Louis Cardinals in 1993. He did not make his debut until 2003 with the Montreal Expos. He went 1–2 with a 4.13 ERA in 23 games.

=== Asian baseball ===
After the 2003 season, his contract was sold to the Kia Tigers of the Korean Baseball League. He spent the 2005 season in Taiwan, with the Uni-President Lions of the Chinese Professional Baseball League.

=== Back in MLB ===
Mañón came back to baseball in the United States in 2006, when he signed a minor league contract with the Baltimore Orioles on March 6. He would later go on to go 0–1 with a 5.40 ERA in 22 games for the Orioles and played in the Triple A All-star game whilst playing for the Ottawa Lynx. He then was granted free agency after the 2006 season on November 19. On June 5, 2007, he signed a minor league contract with the Cincinnati Reds. After that, he was traded to the Athletics on July 13 to complete an earlier deal that had sent pitchers Kirk Saarloos and Dan Denham to the Reds and pitcher David Shafer to the Athletics. He spent most of the 2008 season playing in the Orioles organization for the Double-A Bowie Baysox.

=== Independent & Mexican Leagues ===
On September 12, 2008, Mañón signed with the Long Island Ducks of the Atlantic League. He pitched the rest of 2008 for the Ducks. He played in 2009 World Baseball Classic representing his native country Dominican Republic who were upset by the Netherlands in the March Classic. In 2009, he continued to play for the Ducks. In 2010, he played Sultanes de Monterrey of the Mexican League and the York Revolution of the Atlantic League. In 2011, his final season, he played for the Bridgeport Bluefish of the Atlantic League and the Vaqueros Laguna of the Mexican League.
