= Mike Matthews =

American baseball player (born 1973)

- Pitcher
- Born: October 24, 1973 (age 51); Woodbridge, Virginia, U.S.
- Batted: Left Threw: Left

MLB debut
- May 31, 2000, for the St. Louis Cardinals

Last MLB appearance
- April 24, 2005, for the New York Mets

MLB statistics
- Win–loss record: 14–10
- Earned run average: 4.54
- Strikeouts: 175
- Stats at Baseball Reference

Teams
- St. Louis Cardinals (2000–2002); Milwaukee Brewers (2002); San Diego Padres (2003); Cincinnati Reds (2004); New York Mets (2005)

Michael Scott Matthews (born October 24, 1973) is a former Major League Baseball pitcher who pitched from 2000 to 2005. Matthews graduated from Woodbridge Senior High School in Woodbridge, Virginia. Matthews pitched a single season at Montgomery Junior College in Rockville, Maryland in 1992 before being drafted by the Cleveland Indians in the second round of that year's amateur draft. In August 1999, he was traded twice in a single month, first to the Boston Red Sox organization, then to the St. Louis Cardinals three weeks later. He made his major league debut with the Cardinals on May 31, 2000.

Matthews was a relief pitcher in the major leagues. He was traded to the Milwaukee Brewers toward the end of the 2002 season, signed as a free agent with the San Diego Padres for 2003, with the Cincinnati Reds for 2004, and with the New York Mets for 2005.
