= Rocky Biddle =

American baseball player (born 1976)

- Pitcher
- Born: May 21, 1976 (age 48); Las Vegas, Nevada, U.S.
- Batted: Right Threw: Right

MLB debut
- August 2, 2000, for the Chicago White Sox

Last MLB appearance
- September 6, 2004, for the Montreal Expos

MLB statistics
- Win–loss record: 20–30
- Earned run average: 5.47
- Strikeouts: 261
- Saves: 46
- Stats at Baseball Reference

Teams
- Chicago White Sox (2000–2002); Montreal Expos (2003–2004)

Lee Francis "Rocky" Biddle (born May 21, 1976) is an American former relief pitcher in Major League Baseball. He played for the Chicago White Sox and Montreal Expos. He was drafted by the White Sox in the 1st round (51st pick) of the 1997 amateur draft.
