= Tomo Ohka =

Japanese baseball player and coach (born 1976)

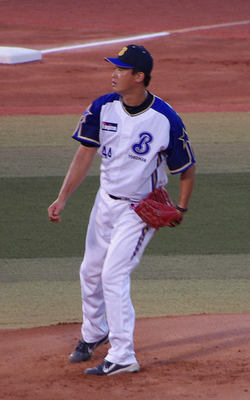
- Ohka with the Yokohama BayStars

Chiba Lotte Marines – No. 89
- Pitcher / Pitching coach
- Born: 18 March 1976 (age 50); Ukyō-ku, Kyoto, Japan
- Batted: Switch Threw: Right

Professional debut
- NPB: 1994, for the Yokohama BayStars
- MLB: July 19, 1999, for the Boston Red Sox

Last appearance
- MLB: October 4, 2009, for the Cleveland Indians
- NPB: August 24, 2011, for the Yokohama BayStars

NPB statistics
- Win–loss record: 8–17
- Earned run average: 5.23
- Strikeouts: 112

MLB statistics
- Win–loss record: 51–68
- Earned run average: 4.26
- Strikeouts: 590
- Stats at Baseball Reference

Teams
- As player: Yokohama BayStars (1994–1998); Boston Red Sox (1999–2001); Montreal Expos / Washington Nationals (2001–2005); Milwaukee Brewers (2005–2006); Toronto Blue Jays (2007); Cleveland Indians (2009); Yokohama BayStars (2010–2011); As coach: Yokohama DeNA BayStars (2018–2023; Chiba Lotte Marines (2025–present)

Tomokazu Ohka (大家 友和, Ōka Tomokazu; IPA: [oːka tomokazɯ]) (born 18 March 1976) is a Japanese former professional baseball pitcher. He played in Major League Baseball (MLB) for the Boston Red Sox (1999–2001), Montreal Expos / Washington Nationals (2001–2005), Milwaukee Brewers (2005–2006), Toronto Blue Jays (2007), Cleveland Indians (2009), in Japan's Baseball Challenge League for the Fukushima Hopes, and in Nippon Professional Baseball (NPB) for the Yokohama BayStars. He throws right-handed and is a switch hitter.

== Coming to America ==
On November 20, 1998, Ohka's contract was purchased by the Boston Red Sox from the Yokohama BayStars (Japan's Central League). Ohka's statistics in Japan were less than flattering, but his ability to control his pitches sparked the interest of the Red Sox.

=== Early success ===
In 1999, Ohka began his North America professional career with the Double-A affiliate of the Boston Red Sox, the Trenton Thunder. In 12 starts he went 8–0 with a 3.00 earned run average (ERA). He was promoted to the Triple-A Pawtucket Red Sox where he had a 1.92 ERA and a 7–0 record. On July 19, 1999, he made his major league debut.

Ohka found himself in the minors again in 2000. That season with Pawtucket, he went 9–6 in 19 starts with a 2.96 ERA, with three complete games. He pitched a perfect game on June 1, 2000, defeating the Charlotte Knights, 2–0, at McCoy Stadium, needing just 76 pitches to retire all 27 Charlotte batters.

In both 1999 and 2000, The Red Sox named Ohka their minor league player of the year. He was in the All-Star Futures Game in 1999 and 2000, and in 2000 he was the Triple-A All-Star Game starting pitcher.

== Major league career ==
Ohka became the first player from Japan to play for the Red Sox when he debuted in 1999. During the middle of the 2001 season, Ohka was sent to Montreal for the veteran closer Ugueth Urbina. Ohka had a mildly successful run with the Expos. His most productive season came with the Expos in 2002, when he posted 13–8 with 118 strikeouts and a 3.18 ERA.

In June 2004, Ohka's right forearm was broken when he was hit by a line drive off the bat of Carlos Beltrán in Kansas City. Ohka underwent major surgery and was out until mid-September. He finished 3–7 with a 3.40 ERA in 15 starts.

=== Washington Nationals and Milwaukee Brewers ===
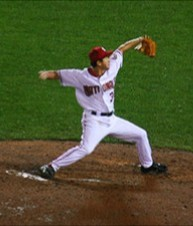
Ohka pitching for the Washington Nationals in 2005

As the Expos moved to Washington, D.C. for the 2005 season, Ohka was part of a starting rotation that included Liván Hernández, Esteban Loaiza and Tony Armas Jr. Ohka was involved in an incident with Washington manager Frank Robinson. Ohka protested being removed from a game, a move which resulted in an undisclosed fine from the team. On June 10, 2005, the Washington Nationals traded Ohka to the Milwaukee Brewers for second baseman Junior Spivey. In Ohka's first game with his new club on June 14, he threw a shutout against the Tampa Bay Devil Rays during interleague play.

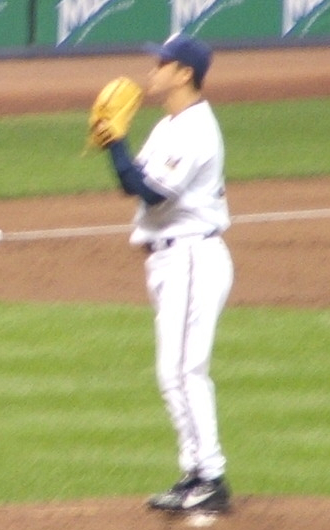
Ohka pitching for the Milwaukee Brewers in 2006

=== Toronto Blue Jays ===
On January 23, 2007, the right-hander reached a tentative agreement with the Toronto Blue Jays on a one-year contract. The agreement was made official on January 25, 2007, and the contract was announced to be worth $1,500,000. Ohka could earn an additional $1,500,000 in incentives. Incentives are usually based upon innings pitched or game appearances.

=== St. Louis Cardinals and Seattle Mariners ===
On June 7, after compiling a 2–5 record in 10 starts, the Toronto Blue Jays designated Ohka for assignment and subsequently released him on June 18. On June 19, 2007, he signed a minor league contract with the St. Louis Cardinals. He was released by the Cardinals on July 3, 2007, after going 0–2 with a 6.87 ERA in 3 starts for their Triple A team, the Memphis Redbirds. Ohka then signed a minor league contract on July 13, 2007, with the Seattle Mariners.

Ohka was released by Seattle on August 5, 2007, after going 0–3 with a 10.32 ERA in four outings, allowing 26 runs in 22 2/3 innings with the Tacoma Rainiers, Seattle's AAA affiliate.

=== Chicago White Sox ===
On February 21, 2008, Ohka signed a minor league contract with the Chicago White Sox, but did not play in the major leagues that year. He became a free agent at the end of the season.

In an eight-year career, Ohka has compiled a 48–57 record with 538 strikeouts and a 4.04 ERA in 943 innings.

=== Cleveland Indians ===
On December 5, 2008, Ohka signed a minor league contract with the Cleveland Indians with an invitation to Spring Training. On March 15, he was reassigned to the minor league camp. He was called up to the majors on May 30. He became a free agent following the season.

=== Return to Japan ===
On April 6, 2010, Ohka signed a contract with his former team, the Yokohama BayStars in Japan. He pitched for them through 2011.

In 2013, he reinvented himself as a knuckleball pitcher and played for the Toyama Thunderbirds of the Baseball Challenge League.

=== Toronto Blue Jays ===
Ohka signed a minor league contract with the Toronto Blue Jays on December 11, 2013. He was a non-roster invitee to spring training, but was reassigned to minor-league camp on March 2, 2014, without making an appearance. He was released by the Blue Jays at the end of spring training.

=== Bridgeport Bluefish ===
On April 30, 2014, Ohka signed with the Bridgeport Bluefish of the Atlantic League of Professional Baseball. In 26 starts for Bridgeport, he compiled a 7–12 record and 5.15 ERA with 49 strikeouts across 157 1/3 innings pitched. Ohka became a free agent following the season.

=== Fukushima Hope ===
Ohka returned to Japan and played with the Toyama Thunderbirds and Fukushima Hope of the semi-pro Baseball Challenge League for the 2015 season.

=== Baltimore Orioles ===
On December 15, 2016, the Baltimore Orioles signed Ohka to a minor league contract. He was released on April 1, 2017, as the Orioles' spring training came to a close.

== Milestone ==
- Ohka pitched a nine-inning perfect game for the Triple-A Pawtucket Red Sox on June 1, 2000. Ohka retired all 27 batters he faced in a 2–0 win over the Charlotte Knights, and threw only 77 pitches to toss the first nine-inning perfect game in the International League since 1952.

== Pop culture ==
- Ohka is the first and only member of the Montreal Expos to be named on The Simpsons. In the March 16, 2003, episode entitled "C. E. D'oh!," Bart Simpson exclaims "Look at me! I'm Tomokazu Ohka of the Montreal Expos!" while playing baseball, to which Milhouse replies "Well, I'm Esteban Yan of the Tampa Bay Devil Rays!", referencing the relative obscurity of the two pitchers and their respective teams.
