= Zach Day =

American baseball player (born 1978)

- Pitcher
- Born: June 15, 1978 (age 48); Cincinnati, Ohio, U.S.
- Batted: Right Threw: Right

MLB debut
- June 15, 2002, for the Montreal Expos

Last MLB appearance
- May 22, 2006, for the Washington Nationals

MLB statistics
- Win–loss record: 21–27
- Earned run average: 4.66
- Strikeouts: 189
- Stats at Baseball Reference

Teams
- Montreal Expos / Washington Nationals (2002–2005); Colorado Rockies (2005–2006); Washington Nationals (2006)

Stephen Zachary Day (born June 15, 1978) is an American former professional baseball right-handed sinker-ball pitcher. He played in Major League Baseball (MLB) for the Montreal Expos / Washington Nationals and Colorado Rockies from 2002 to 2006.

== Career history ==
Day graduated from La Salle High School in Cincinnati in 1996, where he played basketball, baseball and golf and was prep player of the year in Cincinnati in 1995. He went on to attend the University of Cincinnati, studying pre-business. Day was drafted in the fifth round in 1996 by the New York Yankees. He spent four seasons in the organization before being sent to the Cleveland Indians alongside Jake Westbrook in July 2000, to complete a trade for David Justice. In July 2001, Cleveland dealt Day to the Montreal Expos for outfielder Milton Bradley.

=== 2002 ===
Day made his major league debut for the Expos on June 15, 2002, his 24th birthday. He got the win, and was the first pitcher to debut and win on his birthday since at least 1901, possibly ever. He finished 2002 at 4–1 with a 3.62 ERA in 19 games. He also had one save, in which he pitched the final three innings in perfect fashion (0 runs, 0 hits, 5 strikeouts) to nail down a 4–3 win against the Florida Marlins.

=== 2003 ===
Day made 23 starts, going 9–8. He led the majors in wild pitches with 13. He was initially named NL Rookie of the Month in April, but the award was revoked and given to Hee-seop Choi due to Day having reached the rookie limit of service days in 2002.

=== 2004 ===
On May 12, Day hit his first and only career home run, off Wes Obermueller. Day's 2004 season was cut short due to injury. He hit the Disabled List in July with a shoulder injury and then again in August after breaking his middle finger trying to bunt. He made 19 starts, having a respectable 3.93 ERA despite going 5-10 for the Montreal Expos, who relocated and became the Washington Nationals after the season.

=== 2005 ===
Day pitched in 12 games for the Nationals before being traded to Colorado.

He was 0–1 in 5 games for the Rockies.

=== 2006 ===
Day began the season with the Rockies but was designated for assignment after posting an ERA of 10.80 in 3 starts.

After being claimed off waivers by the Nationals, Day was looking to bounce back to his former self. However, after five appearances, Day was placed on the 60-day DL on May 23 for right shoulder tendinitis and underwent rotator cuff surgery on June 6, ending his 2006 season. The Nationals released Day on October 3, 2006, ending his second stint with the team.

=== 2007 ===
On December 20, 2006, he signed a minor league deal with the Kansas City Royals. He spent the year playing for the Triple-A Omaha Royals, starting nine games and relieving in two more. Day became a free agent at the end of the season.

=== 2008 ===
On January 11, 2008, Day signed a minor league contract with the Minnesota Twins, but was released in early May having made 6 appearances for the Fort Myers Miracle. After his release, he announced his retirement due to continuing shoulder problems.

After retiring, Day went back to school to get his degree. He also joined TrackMan and became a prominent figure in baseball analytics and tracking technology.
