= Dan Smith (right-handed pitcher) =

American baseball player (born 1975)

- Pitcher
- Born: September 15, 1975 (age 50); Flemington, New Jersey, U.S.
- Batted: Right Threw: Right

MLB debut
- June 8, 1999, for the Montreal Expos

Last MLB appearance
- June 25, 2003, for the Montreal Expos

MLB statistics
- Win–loss record: 7–12
- Earned run average: 5.23
- Strikeouts: 142
- Stats at Baseball Reference

Teams
- Montreal Expos (1999); Boston Red Sox (2000); Montreal Expos (2002–2003)

Daniel Charles Smith Jr. (born September 15, 1975) is an American former professional right-handed baseball pitcher who played Major League Baseball from 1999–2003 for the Texas Rangers, Montreal Expos and Boston Red Sox. In his major league debut, Smith struck out nine batters, retiring 20 in a row at one point, in a win over the Boston Red Sox. Tony Gwynn recorded his 3,000th career hit off Smith on August 6, 1999. In July 2003, he was placed on the disabled list with inflammation in his rotator cuff which required surgery and would not pitch in the majors again.

In July 2018, Smith was named the CEO of Watco, a transportation company based in Pittsburg, Kansas.
