= 2003 Florida Marlins season =

2003 Florida Marlins
- World Series champions National League champions National League Wild Card winners
- League: National League
- Division: East
- Ballpark: Pro Player Stadium
- City: Miami Gardens, Florida
- Record: 91–71 (.562)
- Divisional place: 2nd
- Owners: Jeffrey Loria
- General managers: Larry Beinfest
- Managers: Jeff Torborg, Jack McKeon
- Television: FSN Florida; WPXM (Len Kasper, Tommy Hutton)
- Radio: WQAM (Dave Van Horne, Jon Sciambi); WQBA (Spanish) (Felo Ramírez, Luis Quintana)

The 2003 Florida Marlins season was the 11th season for the Major League Baseball (MLB) franchise in the National League. The Marlins were the National League Wild Card winners, the National League champions, and the World Series champions. They defeated the New York Yankees in the World Series in six games to win their second World Series championship. The Marlins became the second team in baseball history to win a World Series championship despite being 10 or more games below .500 (as low as 19–29) at some point in the season; the other team was the 1914 Boston Braves.

This was the last Marlins team to make the postseason until 2020, and last Marlins team to make the postseason in a full season until 2023.

== Offseason ==
The Marlins pulled off some blockbuster deals during the 2003 off season, the most impressive being that of 10-time Gold Glove winning catcher Iván Rodríguez. They also traded catcher Charles Johnson and outfielder Preston Wilson to the Colorado Rockies for lead-off man Juan Pierre.

- November 16, 2002: Charles Johnson was traded by the Florida Marlins with Vic Darensbourg, Pablo Ozuna, and Preston Wilson to the Colorado Rockies for Juan Pierre, Mike Hampton, and cash (shortly thereafter, Mike Hampton was traded to the Atlanta Braves for Tim Spooneybarger).
- November 12, 2002: Matt Treanor signed as a free agent with the Florida Marlins.
- January 8, 2003: Todd Hollandsworth signed as a free agent with the Florida Marlins.
- January 28, 2003: Iván Rodríguez signed as a free agent with the Florida Marlins.
- February 13, 2003: Al Martin signed as a free agent with the Florida Marlins.
- February 15, 2003: Kevin Millar was purchased by the Boston Red Sox from the Florida Marlins.
- March 28, 2003: Al Martin was released by the Florida Marlins.

== Regular season ==
=== Opening Day starters ===
- Josh Beckett – SP
- Luis Castillo – 2B
- Juan Encarnación – RF
- Álex González – SS
- Todd Hollandsworth – LF
- Derrek Lee – 1B
- Mike Lowell – 3B
- Juan Pierre – CF
- Iván Rodríguez – C

=== Season standings ===
==== National League East ====
NL East
Team	W	L	Pct.	GB	Home	Road
Atlanta Braves	101	61	.623	—	55‍–‍26	46‍–‍35
Florida Marlins	91	71	.562	10	53‍–‍28	38‍–‍43
Philadelphia Phillies	86	76	.531	15	49‍–‍32	37‍–‍44
Montreal Expos	83	79	.512	18	52‍–‍29	31‍–‍50
New York Mets	66	95	.410	34½	34‍–‍46	32‍–‍49

==== Record vs. opponents ====
2003 National League record Source: MLB Standings Grid – 2003
Team	AZ	ATL	CHC	CIN	COL	FLA	HOU	LAD	MIL	MON	NYM	PHI	PIT	SD	SF	STL	AL
Arizona	—	2–5	2–4	7–2	10–9	2–5	5–1	10–9	3–3	4–2	4–2	4–2	3–3	9–10	5–14	3–3	11–4
Atlanta	5–2	—	4–2	3–3	6–0	9–10	5–1	4–2	4–2	12–7	11–8	9–10	7–2	6–1	2–4	4–2	10–5
Chicago	4–2	2–4	—	10–7	3–3	4–2	9–7	2–4	10–6	3–3	5–1	1–5	10–8	4–2	4–2	8–9	9–9
Cincinnati	2–7	3–3	7–10	—	4–2	2–4	5–12	2–4	8–10	2–4	2–4	5–4	5–11	3–3	3–3	9–7	7–5
Colorado	9–10	0–6	3–3	2–4	—	4–2	2–4	7–12	5–1	3–4	2–5	2–4	3–6	12–7	7–12	4–2	9–6
Florida	5–2	10–9	2–4	4–2	2–4	—	1–5	2–5	7–2	13–6	12–7	13–6	2–4	5–1	1–5	3–3	9–6
Houston	1–5	1–5	7–9	12–5	4–2	5–1	—	4–2	9–8	3–3	2–4	2–4	10–6	3–3	2–4	11–7	11–7
Los Angeles	9–10	2–4	4–2	4–2	12–7	5–2	2–4	—	4–2	4–2	3–3	2–5	5–1	8–11	6–13	4–2	11–7
Milwaukee	3–3	2–4	6–10	10–8	1–5	2–7	8–9	2–4	—	0–6	6–3	4–2	10–7	5–1	1–5	3–13	5–7
Montreal	2–4	7–12	3–3	4–2	4–3	6–13	3–3	2–4	6–0	—	14–5	8–11	3–3	4–2	7–0	1–5	9–9
New York	2–4	8–11	1–5	4–2	5–2	7–12	4–2	3–3	3–6	5–14	—	7–12	4–2	3–3	4–2	1–5	5–10
Philadelphia	2–4	10–9	5–1	4–5	4–2	6–13	4–2	5–2	2–4	11–8	12–7	—	2–4	4–3	3–3	4–2	8–7
Pittsburgh	3–3	2–7	8–10	11–5	6–3	4–2	6–10	1–5	7–10	3–3	2–4	4–2	—	4–2	2–4	7–10	5–7
San Diego	10–9	1–6	2–4	3–3	7–12	1–5	3–3	11–8	1–5	2–4	3–3	3–4	2–4	—	5–14	2–4	8–10
San Francisco	14–5	4–2	2–4	3–3	12–7	5–1	4–2	13–6	5–1	0–7	2–4	3–3	4–2	14–5	—	5–1	10–8
St. Louis	3–3	2–4	9–8	7–9	2–4	3–3	7–11	2–4	13–3	5–1	5–1	2–4	10–7	4–2	1–5	—	10–8

=== Game log ===
Legend
Marlins win	Marlins loss	Game postponed

2003 game log (91–71)
March/April (14–15)

#	Date	Opponent	Score	Win	Loss	Save	Attendance	Record	Streak
1	March 31	Phillies	5–8	Millwood (1–0)	Beckett (0–1)	Mesa (1)	37,137	0–1	L1
2	April 2	Phillies	2–8	Wolf (1–0)	Pavano (0–1)	—	10,534	0–2	L2
3	April 3	Phillies	8–3	Redman (1–0)	Padilla (0–1)	—	14,585	1–2	W1
4	April 4	@ Braves	7–12	Hernandez (1–0)	Nunez (0–1)	Smoltz (1)	20,642	1–3	L1
5	April 5	@ Braves	17–1	Beckett (1–1)	Maddux (0–2)	—	23,081	2–3	W1
6	April 6	@ Braves	4–13	Ramirez (1–1)	Penny (0–1)	—	21,253	2–4	L1
7	April 7	@ Braves	0–3	Ortiz (1–1)	Pavano (0–2)	Smoltz (2)	19,326	2–5	L2
8	April 8	Mets	2–4	Leiter (2–0)	Redman (1–1)	Benitez (3)	10,103	2–6	L3
9	April 9	Mets	3–2	Looper (1–0)	Stanton (0–1)	—	10,052	3–6	W1
10	April 10	Mets	4–3	Spooneybarger (1–0)	Benitez (0–2)	—	10,267	4–6	W2
11	April 11	Braves	7–4	Penny (1–1)	Ramirez (1–2)	Looper (1)	12,045	5–6	W3
12	April 12	Braves	12–5	Pavano (1–2)	Ortiz (1–2)	—	25,203	6–6	W4
13	April 13	Braves	1–7	Maddux (1–3)	Redman (1–2)	Smoltz (3)	21,834	6–7	L1
14	April 14	@ Phillies	2–5	Padilla (2–1)	Burnett (0–1)	Mesa (2)	13,611	6–8	L2
15	April 15	@ Phillies	3–4	Silva (2–0)	Beckett (1–2)	Mesa (3)	17,508	6–9	L3
16	April 16	@ Phillies	3–1	Penny (2–1)	Myers (0–2)	Looper (2)	15,167	7–9	W1
17	April 17	@ Phillies	7–3	Pavano (2–2)	Millwood (2–1)	—	13,968	8–9	W2
18	April 18	@ Mets	3–6	Weathers (1–0)	Nunez (0–2)	Benitez (5)	18,525	8–10	L1
19	April 19	@ Mets	6–5	Looper (2–0)	Benitez (0–3)	—	36,448	9–10	W1
20	April 20	@ Mets	4–7	Glavine (3–1)	Nunez (0–3)	—	26,245	9–11	L1
21	April 22	Brewers	4–2	Almanza (1–0)	de los Santos (0–1)	Looper (3)	10,115	10–11	W1
22	April 23	Brewers	5–4 (12)	Almanza (2–0)	Nance (0–1)	—	9,182	11–11	W2
23	April 24	Brewers	4–2	Redman (2–2)	Ritchie (1–2)	—	9,069	12–11	W3
24	April 25	Cardinals	2–9	Tomko (2–2)	Burnett (0–2)	—	12,081	12–12	L1
25	April 26	Cardinals	5–3	Beckett (2–2)	Kline (0–3)	Looper (4)	12,286	13–12	W1
26	April 27	Cardinals	6–7 (20)	Kline (1–3)	Pavano (2–3)	—	10,075	13–13	L1
27	April 28	@ Diamondbacks	1–7	Dessens (3–2)	Wayne (0–1)	—	25,468	13–14	L2
28	April 29	@ Diamondbacks	7–5	Redman (3–2)	Kim (1–5)	—	29,380	14–14	W1
29	April 30	@ Diamondbacks	3–7	Batista (1–2)	Pavano (2–4)	Mantei (4)	24,306	14–15	L1

May (12–16)

#	Date	Opponent	Score	Win	Loss	Save	Attendance	Record	Streak
30	May 1	@ Diamondbacks	4–3	Almanza (3–0)	Villarreal (1–2)	Looper (5)	25,044	15–15	W1
31	May 2	@ Astros	3–4	Stone (2–0)	Penny (2–2)	Wagner (5)	22,659	15–16	L1
32	May 3	@ Astros	2–5	Redding (3–2)	Wayne (0–2)	Dotel (2)	28,188	15–17	L2
33	May 4	@ Astros	2–5	Lidge (3–0)	Spooneybarger (1–1)	Wagner (6)	31,764	15–18	L3
34	May 6	Giants	2–4	Nathan (3–0)	Almanza (3–1)	Worrell (9)	11,701	15–19	L4
35	May 7	Giants	2–3	Moss (5–0)	Beckett (2–3)	Worrell (10)	11,464	15–20	L5
36	May 8	Giants	2–3	Nathan (4–0)	Looper (2–1)	Worrell (11)	13,812	15–21	L6
37	May 9	Rockies	5–4	Looper (3–1)	Speier (2–1)	—	10,272	16–21	W1
38	May 10	Rockies	4–5	Jennings (3–3)	Tejera (0–1)	Jimenez (8)	16,543	16–22	L1
39	May 11	Rockies	7–2	Pavano (3–4)	Cook (1–3)	—	9,205	17–22	W1
40	May 12	@ Padres	6–1	Levrault (1–0)	Condrey (1–2)	—	15,869	18–22	W2
41	May 13	@ Padres	5–6 (10)	Herges (1–0)	Looper (3–2)	—	13,203	18–23	L1
42	May 14	@ Padres	10–3	Willis (1–0)	Bynum (0–2)	—	10,935	19–23	W1
43	May 16	@ Dodgers	1–2	Dreifort (3–3)	Almanza (3–2)	Gagne (13)	47,383	19–24	L1
44	May 17	@ Dodgers	1–4	Perez (3–2)	Tejera (0–2)	Gagne (14)	38,248	19–25	L2
45	May 18	@ Dodgers	1–2	Nomo (5–4)	Penny (2–3)	Gagne (15)	43,775	19–26	L3
46	May 20	@ Expos	4–6	Vazquez (4–2)	Willis (1–1)	Biddle (13)	5,435	19–27	L4
47	May 21	@ Expos	2–7	Vargas (2–1)	Pavano (3–5)	—	5,282	19–28	L5
48	May 22	@ Expos	2–8	Hernandez (4–2)	Tejera (0–3)	—	6,249	19–29	L6
49	May 23	@ Reds	8–4	Phelps (1–0)	Austin (2–2)	—	30,596	20–29	W1
50	May 24	@ Reds	5–4	Penny (3–3)	Wilson (2–4)	Looper (6)	41,285	21–29	W2
51	May 25	@ Reds	6–2	Willis (2–1)	Graves (3–3)	Looper (7)	35,073	22–29	W3
52	May 26	Expos	5–1	Pavano (4–5)	Vargas (2–2)	—	8,362	23–29	W4
–	May 27	Expos	Postponed (rain, makeup May 28)						
53	May 28 (1)	Expos	4–3	Phelps (2–0)	Hernandez (4–3)	Looper (8)	N/A	24–29	W5
54	May 28 (2)	Expos	6–0	Tejera (1–3)	Day (4–3)	—	9,169	25–29	W6
55	May 29	Expos	2–3	Ohka (4–5)	Almanza (3–3)	Biddle (15)	9,052	25–30	L1
56	May 30	Reds	3–4 (11)	White (3–0)	Almanza (3–4)	Williamson (12)	17,385	25–31	L2
57	May 31	Reds	3–2	Willis (3–1)	Graves (3–4)	Looper (9)	16,190	26–31	W1

June (16–11)

#	Date	Opponent	Score	Win	Loss	Save	Attendance	Record	Streak
58	June 1	Reds	6–9	Sullivan (6–0)	Pavano (4–6)	Williamson (13)	12,236	26–32	L1
59	June 3	Athletics	13–2	Penny (4–3)	Mulder (8–3)	—	10,195	27–32	W1
60	June 4	Athletics	5–6	Bradford (4–3)	Spooneybarger (1–2)	Foulke (15)	10,215	27–33	L1
61	June 5	Athletics	2–0	Willis (4–1)	Lilly (3–4)	Looper (10)	10,140	28–33	W1
62	June 6	Angels	4–1	Pavano (5–6)	Appier (4–3)	Looper (11)	13,188	29–33	W2
63	June 7	Angels	2–9	Sele (3–3)	Phelps (2–1)	—	23,483	29–34	L1
64	June 8	Angels	5–8	Ortiz (6–5)	Penny (4–4)	Percival (8)	12,620	29–35	L2
65	June 10	@ Brewers	12–4	Redman (4–2)	Sheets (6–5)	—	11,598	30–35	W1
66	June 11	@ Brewers	6–5	Willis (5–1)	Franklin (3–5)	Looper (12)	12,419	31–35	W2
67	June 12	@ Brewers	5–6	Kinney (5–4)	Pavano (5–7)	DeJean (15)	13,075	31–36	L1
68	June 13	@ Rangers	8–0	Penny (5–4)	Mounce (0–1)	—	26,075	32–36	W1
69	June 14	@ Rangers	2–13	Valdez (6–2)	Phelps (2–2)	—	37,443	32–37	L1
70	June 15	@ Rangers	10–4	Redman (5–2)	Thomson (4–8)	—	26,021	33–37	W1
71	June 16	Mets	1–0	Willis (6–1)	Glavine (5–7)	—	10,624	34–37	W2
72	June 17	Mets	0–5	Seo (5–2)	Pavano (5–8)	—	10,359	34–38	L1
73	June 18	Mets	5–10	Leiter (8–3)	Penny (5–5)	Wheeler (1)	11,326	34–39	L2
74	June 19	Mets	5–1	Phelps (3–2)	Bacsik (1–2)	—	10,400	35–39	W1
75	June 20	Devil Rays	3–1 (11)	Almanza (4–4)	Levine (2–5)	—	12,515	36–39	W2
76	June 21	Devil Rays	2–0 (5)	Willis (7–1)	Standridge (0–2)	—	15,397	37–39	W3
77	June 22	Devil Rays	3–2	Pavano (6–8)	Gonzalez (3–3)	Looper (13)	10,392	38–39	W4
78	June 24	@ Mets	8–4	Penny (6–5)	Leiter (8–4)	Tejera (1)	22,226	39–39	W5
79	June 25	@ Mets	3–6	Trachsel (6–5)	Redman (5–3)	Benitez (18)	22,563	39–40	L1
80	June 26	@ Mets	6–1	Willis (8–1)	Heilman (0–1)	—	30,378	40–40	W1
81	June 27	@ Red Sox	8–25	Kim (3–6)	Pavano (6–9)	—	34,764	40–41	L1
82	June 28	@ Red Sox	10–9	Bump (1–0)	Lyon (3–4)	Looper (14)	34,804	41–41	W1
83	June 29	@ Red Sox	7–11	Lowe (9–3)	Penny (6–6)	—	34,476	41–42	L1
84	June 30	Braves	8–1	Redman (6–3)	Maddux (6–8)	—	11,254	42–42	W1

July (17–7)

#	Date	Opponent	Score	Win	Loss	Save	Attendance	Record	Streak
85	July 1	Braves	20–1	Beckett (3–3)	Hampton (3–5)	—	13,073	43–42	W2
86	July 2	Braves	1–2 (13)	Gryboski (5–3)	Almanza (4–5)	Smoltz (30)	30,634	43–43	L1
87	July 4	@ Phillies	2–1	Looper (4–2)	Mesa (3–5)	—	19,690	44–43	W1
88	July 5	@ Phillies	5–4	Penny (7–6)	Padilla (7–8)	Looper (15)	52,110	45–43	W2
89	July 6	@ Phillies	6–3	Redman (7–3)	Wolf (9–4)	—	26,244	46–43	W3
90	July 7	@ Cubs	3–6	Clement (6–7)	Beckett (3–4)	Borowski (17)	38,662	46–44	L1
91	July 8	@ Cubs	4–3	Bump (2–0)	Remlinger (5–3)	Looper (16)	33,227	47–44	W1
92	July 9	@ Cubs	1–5	Wood (9–6)	Pavano (6–10)	—	33,054	47–45	L1
93	July 11	@ Expos	5–4	Penny (8–6)	Biddle (3–4)	Looper (17)	7,251	48–45	W1
94	July 12	@ Expos	1–7	Hernandez (9–6)	Redman (7–4)	—	28,170	48–46	L1
95	July 13	@ Expos	11–4	Willis (9–1)	Vargas (6–5)	—	16,084	49–46	W1
–	July 15	74th All-Star Game in Chicago, IL							
96	July 18	Cubs	6–0	Redman (8–4)	Clement (7–8)	—	26,174	50–46	W2
97	July 19	Cubs	0–1	Wood (10–6)	Penny (8–7)	—	30,432	50–47	L1
98	July 20	Cubs	2–16	Zambrano (7–8)	Willis (9–2)	—	25,574	50–48	L2
99	July 21	Expos	4–1	Beckett (4–4)	Knott (0–1)	—	10,769	51–48	W1
100	July 22	Expos	9–1	Pavano (7–10)	Ohka (7–10)	—	10,512	52–48	W2
101	July 23	@ Braves	5–4 (12)	Bump (3–0)	Hodges (3–1)	—	27,137	53–48	W3
102	July 24	@ Braves	2–5	Ortiz (14–4)	Penny (8–8)	Smoltz (37)	33,711	53–49	L1
103	July 25	Phillies	11–5	Urbina (1–4)	Williams (1–4)	—	18,106	54–49	W1
104	July 26	Phillies	10–5	Beckett (5–4)	Duckworth (3–5)	Looper (18)	20,545	55–49	W2
105	July 27	Phillies	7–6	Urbina (2–4)	Williams (1–5)	—	12,467	56–49	W3
106	July 28	Diamondbacks	3–2	Redman (9–4)	Batista (7–6)	Looper (19)	10,472	57–49	W4
107	July 29	Diamondbacks	2–1	Penny (9–8)	Webb (7–4)	Looper (20)	11,469	58–49	W5
108	July 30	Diamondbacks	3–1	Willis (10–2)	Johnson (1–4)	Looper (21)	37,735	59–49	W6

August (14–14)

#	Date	Opponent	Score	Win	Loss	Save	Attendance	Record	Streak
109	August 1	Astros	1–2	Redding (8–9)	Beckett (5–5)	Wagner (32)	12,392	59–50	L1
110	August 2	Astros	5–2	Pavano (8–10)	Robertson (10–5)	Looper (22)	25,206	60–50	W1
111	August 3	Astros	1–3	Fernandez (1–0)	Redman (9–5)	Wagner (33)	12,262	60–51	L1
112	August 5	@ Cardinals	4–0	Penny (10–8)	Williams (14–5)	—	35,468	61–51	W1
113	August 6	@ Cardinals	7–3	Willis (11–2)	Haren (2–3)	—	31,606	62–51	W2
114	August 7	@ Cardinals	0–3	Tomko (8–7)	Beckett (5–6)	Isringhausen (9)	31,002	62–52	L1
115	August 8	@ Brewers	5–3	Pavano (9–10)	Sheets (10–9)	Looper (23)	25,022	63–52	W1
116	August 9	@ Brewers	7–1	Redman (10–5)	Manning (0–2)	—	28,488	64–52	W2
117	August 10	@ Brewers	4–5	de los Santos (2–3)	Penny (10–9)	Kolb (6)	37,521	64–53	L1
118	August 11	Dodgers	3–9	Od. Perez (8–9)	Willis (11–3)	—	20,288	64–54	L2
119	August 12	Dodgers	5–4 (13)	Fox (2–2)	Shuey (4–4)	—	12,025	65–54	W1
120	August 13	Dodgers	2–1 (11)	Bump (4–0)	Alvarez (0–1)	—	12,323	66–54	W2
121	August 14	Dodgers	4–6	Brown (12–6)	Redman (10–6)	Gagne (40)	12,561	66–55	L1
122	August 15	Padres	10–0	Penny (11–9)	Ol. Perez (4–6)	—	18,349	67–55	W1
123	August 16	Padres	6–3	Fox (3–2)	Witasick (3–3)	Looper (24)	26,104	68–55	W2
124	August 17	Padres	11–7	Beckett (6–6)	Eaton (7–9)	Tejera (2)	12,052	69–55	W3
125	August 19	@ Rockies	2–10	Stark (2–1)	Pavano (9–11)	—	25,889	69–56	L1
126	August 20	@ Rockies	3–9	Vance (1–0)	Redman (10–7)	—	23,534	69–57	L2
127	August 21	@ Rockies	4–5	Speier (3–1)	Looper (4–3)	—	23,846	69–58	L3
128	August 22	@ Giants	4–6	Ponson (15–9)	Willis (11–4)	Worrell (26)	42,244	69–59	L4
129	August 23	@ Giants	2–3	Brower (8–4)	Beckett (6–7)	Worrell (27)	42,189	69–60	L5
130	August 24	@ Giants	7–4	Pavano (10–11)	Reuter (7–4)	—	41.886	70–60	W1
131	August 26	@ Pirates	3–4	Lincoln (2–4)	Redman (10–8)	Tavarez (3)	12,219	70–61	L1
132	August 27	@ Pirates	0–4	Wells (6–7)	Penny (11–10)	—	18,264	70–62	L2
133	August 28	@ Pirates	0–5	Fogg (8–7)	Willis (11–5)	—	12,679	70–63	L3
134	August 29	Expos	3–2	Looper (5–3)	Biddle (4–8)	—	12,231	71–63	W1
135	August 30	Expos	4–3	Pavano (11–11)	Hernandez (14–8)	Looper (25)	20,724	72–63	W2
136	August 31	Expos	5–3	Redman (11–8)	Day (7–6)	Urbina (27)	11,105	73–63	W3

September (18–8)

#	Date	Opponent	Score	Win	Loss	Save	Attendance	Record	Streak
137	September 1	Expos	5–2	Penny (12–10)	Ohka (8–11)	Looper (26)	12,413	74–63	W4
138	September 2	Pirates	2–3	Wells (7–7)	Willis (11–6)	Tavarez (4)	10,327	74–64	L1
139	September 3	Pirates	3–0	Beckett (7–7)	Fogg (8–8)	Urbina (28)	11,135	75–64	W1
140	September 4	Pirates	5–1	Tejera (2–3)	Torres (5–4)	—	10,213	76–64	W2
141	September 5	@ Expos (Note: Games the Montreal Expos played at Hiram Bithorn Stadium in San Juan, Puerto Rico, during the 2003 season counted as Expos home games.)	2–6	Hernandez (15–8)	Redman (11–9)	—	11,509	76–65	L1
142	September 6	@ Expos	14–4	Penny (13–10)	Ohka (8–12)	—	14,570	77–65	W1
143	September 7	@ Expos	3–1	Willis (12–6)	Vazquez (12–10)	Looper (27)	12,647	78–65	W2
144	September 8	@ Mets	5–0	Beckett (8–7)	Trachsel (14–9)	—	15,155	79–65	W3
145	September 9	@ Mets	3–1	Urbina (3–4)	Weathers (1–6)	Looper (28)	29,410	80–65	W4
146	September 10	@ Mets	7–3	Redman (12–9)	Seo (8–11)	—	16,699	81–65	W5
147	September 12	Braves	5–4	Looper (6–3)	King (3–3)	—	25,622	82–65	W6
148	September 13	Braves	8–3	Willis (13–6)	Ortiz (19–7)	—	40,414	83–65	W7
149	September 14	Braves	4–8	Cunnane (2–1)	Looper (6–4)	—	18,725	83–66	L1
150	September 16	@ Phillies	0–14	Padilla (14–10)	Pavano (11–12)	—	36,479	83–67	L2
151	September 17	@ Phillies	11–4	Redman (13–9)	Myers (14–8)	—	33,761	84–67	W1
152	September 18	@ Phillies	4–5	Cormier (7–0)	Fox (3–3)	—	20,950	84–68	L1
153	September 19	@ Braves	0–1	Ortiz (20–7)	Beckett (8–8)	—	35,942	84–69	L2
154	September 20	@ Braves	6–5 (11)	Helling (8–8)	Cunnane (2–2)	—	42,496	85–69	W1
155	September 21	@ Braves	0–8	Maddux (15–11)	Pavano (11–13)	—	33,827	85–70	L1
156	September 22	@ Braves	6–3	Redman (14–9)	Hampton (14–8)	Urbina (29)	17,345	86–70	W1
157	September 23	Phillies	5–4	Tejera (3–3)	Williams (1–7)	Urbina (30)	25,311	87–70	W2
158	September 24	Phillies	6–5	Beckett (9–8)	Myers (14–9)	Urbina (31)	28,520	88–70	W3
159	September 25	Phillies	8–4	Penny (14–10)	Wolf (16–10)	—	31,935	89–70	W4
160	September 26	Mets	4–3	Pavano (12–13)	Heilman (2–7)	Urbina (32)	33,215	90–70	W5
161	September 27	Mets	3–9	Seo (9–11)	Tejera (3–4)	—	30,204	90–71	L1
162	September 28	Mets	4–0	Willis (14–6)	Griffiths (1–4)	—	27,529	91–71	W1

=== Postseason game log ===
Legend
Marlins win	Marlins loss	Game postponed

2003 postseason game log (11–6)
NLDS vs San Francisco (3–1)

#	Date	Opponent	Score	Win	Loss	Save	Attendance	Record
1	September 30	@ Giants	0–2	Schmidt (1–0)	Beckett (0–1)	—	43,704	0–1
2	October 1	@ Giants	9–5	Pavano (1–0)	Nathan (0–1)	—	43,766	1–1
3	October 3	Giants	4–3 (11)	Looper (1–0)	Worrell (0–1)	—	61,488	2–1
4	October 4	Giants	7–6	Pavano (2–0)	Rodriguez (0–1)	Urbina (1)	65,464	3–1

NLCS vs Chicago (4–3)

#	Date	Opponent	Score	Win	Loss	Save	Attendance	Record
1	October 7	@ Cubs	9–8 (11)	Urbina (1–0)	Guthrie (0–1)	Looper (1)	39,567	1–0
2	October 8	@ Cubs	3–12	Prior (1–0)	Penny (0–1)	—	39,562	1–1
3	October 10	Cubs	4–5 (11)	Borowski (1–0)	Tejera (0–1)	Remlinger (1)	65,115	1–2
4	October 11	Cubs	3–8	Clement (1–0)	Willis (0–1)	—	65,829	1–3
5	October 12	Cubs	4–0	Beckett (1–0)	Zambrano (0–1)	—	65,279	2–3
6	October 14	@ Cubs	8–3	Fox (1–0)	Prior (1–1)	—	39,577	3–3
7	October 15	@ Cubs	9–6	Penny (1–1)	Wood (0–1)	Urbina (1)	39,574	4–3

World Series vs New York (4–2)

#	Date	Opponent	Score	Win	Loss	Save	Attendance	Record
1	October 18	@ Yankees	3–2	Penny (1–0)	Wells (0–1)	Urbina (1)	55,769	1–0
2	October 19	@ Yankees	1–6	Pettitte (1–0)	Redman (0–1)	—	55,750	1–1
3	October 21	Yankees	1–6	Mussina (1–0)	Beckett (0–1)	Rivera (1)	65,731	1–2
4	October 22	Yankees	4–3 (12)	Looper (1–0)	Weaver (0–1)	—	65,934	2–2
5	October 23	Yankees	6–4	Penny (2–0)	Contreras (0–1)	Urbina (2)	65,975	3–2
6	October 25	@ Yankees	2–0	Beckett (1–1)	Pettitte (1–1)	—	55,773	4–2

=== Sluggish start ===
Jeff Torborg, the manager at the start of the season, led the team to a 16-22 start. Adding to that, their three top pitchers A. J. Burnett, Josh Beckett and Mark Redman, had each endured injuries that season, but Beckett and Redman were able to return to finish the rest of 2003. On May 11, Torborg was fired and replaced with Jack McKeon, a 72-year-old who began his major league managerial career in 1973 with the Kansas City Royals.

=== Midseason acquisitions ===
- Miguel Cabrera – 3B → called up from the AA Carolina Mudcats
- Jeff Conine – 1B → acquired from Baltimore in exchange for two minor league players.
- Dontrelle Willis – LHP → called up from the Mudcats.
- Ugueth Urbina – RHP → acquired from Texas in exchange for Adrián González and two other minor league players.
- Aaron Small (RHP) signed as a free agent.

=== Roster ===
2003 Florida Marlins
Roster
Pitchers: 29 Armando Almanza; 32 Juan Alvarez; 61,21 Josh Beckett; 33 Toby Borland; 40 Nate Bump; 34 A. J. Burnett; 49 Chad Fox; 38 Rick Helling; 44 Allen Levrault; 41 Braden Looper; 39 Blaine Neal; 36 Vladimir Núñez; 56 Kevin Olsen; 45 Carl Pavano; 31 Brad Penny; 57 Tommy Phelps; 55 Mark Redman; 91 Tim Spooneybarger; 58 Michael Tejera; 74 Ugueth Urbina; 48 Justin Wayne; 35 Dontrelle Willis	Catchers: 17 Ramón Castro; 52 Mike Redmond; 7 Iván Rodríguez; Infielders: 1 Luis Castillo; 11 Álex González; 25 Derrek Lee; 19 Mike Lowell	Outfielders: 21 Chad Allen; 20 Miguel Cabrera; 18 Jeff Conine; 43 Juan Encarnación; 14 Todd Hollandsworth; 9 Juan Pierre; 4 Gerald Williams; Other batters: 22 Brian Banks; 6 Andy Fox; 10 Lenny Harris; 12 Mike Mordecai	Manager: 15 Jack McKeon; 10 Jeff Torborg; Coaches: 38 Brad Arnsberg (pitching); 67 Pierre Arsenault (bullpen); 47 Jeff Cox (bench/bullpen); 23 Doug Davis (bench); 13 Ozzie Guillén (third base); 16 Perry Hill (first base); 28 Bill Robinson (hitting); 26 Wayne Rosenthal (pitching)

== Player stats ==
= Indicates team leader

=== Batting ===
==== Starters by position ====
Note: Pos = Position; G = Games played; AB = At bats; H = Hits; Avg. = Batting average; HR = Home runs; RBI = Runs batted in

Pos	Player	G	AB	H	Avg.	HR	RBI
C	Iván Rodríguez	144	511	152	.297	16	85
1B	Derrek Lee	155	539	146	.271	31	92
2B	Luis Castillo	152	595	187	.314	6	39
3B	Mike Lowell	130	492	136	.276	32	105
SS	Álex González	150	528	135	.256	18	77
LF	Todd Hollandsworth	93	228	58	.254	3	20
CF	Juan Pierre	162	668	204	.305	1	41
RF	Juan Encarnación	156	601	162	.270	19	94

==== Other batters ====
Note: G = Games played; AB = At bats; H = Hits; Avg. = Batting average; HR = Home runs; RBI = Runs batted in

Player	G	AB	H	Avg.	HR	RBI
Miguel Cabrera	87	314	84	.268	12	62
Brian Banks	92	149	35	.235	4	23
Mike Redmond	59	125	30	.240	0	11
Andy Fox	70	108	21	.194	0	8
Mike Mordecai	65	89	19	.213	2	8
Jeff Conine	25	84	20	.238	5	15
Ramón Castro	40	53	15	.283	5	8
Gerald Williams	27	31	4	.129	0	3
Chad Allen	12	24	5	.208	0	0
Lenny Harris	13	14	4	.286	0	1

=== Pitching ===
==== Starting pitchers ====
Note: G = Games pitched; GS = Games started; IP = Innings pitched; W = Wins; L = Losses; ERA = Earned run average; SO = Strikeouts

Player	G	GS	IP	W	L	ERA	SO
Carl Pavano	33	32	201.0	12	13	4.30	133
Brad Penny	32	32	196.1	14	10	4.13	138
Mark Redman	29	29	190.2	14	9	3.59	151
Dontrelle Willis	27	27	160.2	14	6	3.30	142
Josh Beckett	24	23	142.0	9	8	3.04	152
A. J. Burnett	4	4	23.0	0	2	4.70	21
Justin Wayne	2	2	5.1	0	2	11.81	1

==== Other pitchers ====
Note: G = Games pitched; IP = Innings pitched; W = Wins; L = Losses; ERA = Earned run average; SO = Strikeouts

Player	G	IP	W	L	ERA	SO
Michael Tejera	50	81.0	3	4	4.67	58
Tommy Phelps	27	63.0	3	2	4.00	43

==== Relief pitchers ====
Note: G = Games pitched; W = Wins; L = Losses; SV = Saves; ERA = Earned run average; SO = Strikeouts

Player	G	W	L	SV	ERA	SO
Braden Looper	74	6	4	28	3.68	56
Armando Almanza	51	4	5	0	6.08	49
Tim Spooneybarger	33	1	2	0	4.07	32
Ugueth Urbina	33	3	0	6	1.41	37
Nate Bump	32	4	0	0	4.71	17
Chad Fox	21	2	1	0	2.13	27
Allen Levrault	19	1	0	0	3.86	21
Blaine Neal	18	0	0	0	8.14	10
Vladimir Núñez	14	0	3	0	16.03	10
Rick Helling	11	1	0	0	0.55	12
Juan Alvarez	9	0	0	0	3.09	6
Kevin Olsen	7	0	0	0	12.75	12
Toby Borland	7	0	0	0	1.86	4

== Postseason ==
With a 4–3 win over the New York Mets on September 26, the Marlins clinched their second wildcard in team history, and finishing with an overall record of 91–71.

=== National League Division Series ===
The Marlins won the Division Series over the heavily favored defending National League champion San Francisco Giants. The series ended with a play at the plate with catcher Iván Rodríguez prevailing over Giants first baseman J. T. Snow. Coupled with a perfect throw from Conine and an amazing catch from Rodríguez, Snow was attempting to score by using a football type bulldozing move, but Rodríguez held on and the Marlins won, marking the first time that a post-season series ended with the potential tying run being thrown out at home plate.

=== NLCS ===
The 2003 National League Championship Series is one of the most infamous post-season series in MLB history. The Florida Marlins had previously been as low as 19-29 (.396) in the National League. The Cubs jumped to a 3-1 lead including 2 games in Miami and were the favorites to take the series. Game Five brought the series back to Wrigley Field where the Cubs needed only one more win to advance to the World Series. In Game Six, the Cubs lost to the Marlins despite holding a 3-0 lead in the eighth inning, tying the series. This was the game of the Steve Bartman incident. In game seven, the Marlins beat the Cubs in Chicago clinching their second pennant in 6 years.

=== 2003 World Series ===
In the World Series, the underdog Marlins prevailed over the Yankees, 4 games to 2. This World Series marked the 100th anniversary of the annual event, although because there had not been a World Series played in what would have been its second year (1904), and the cancellation of all post-season play as a result of the strike in 1994, it was only the 99th World Series played. Josh Beckett was named the World Series MVP.

==== Quote ====
Trying to win it all again. Posada, slow roller, right side. Beckett picks it up, tags Posada, and the Florida Marlins are World Champions. The Marlins have stunned the Yankees, shocked New York, and this improbable team, improbable ride, they end up on top, winning in 6 games over the Yankees.

— Joe Buck, FOX Sports

== Farm system ==
Level	Team	League	Manager
AAA	Albuquerque Isotopes	Pacific Coast League	Dean Treanor
AA	Carolina Mudcats	Southern League	Tracy Woodson
A	Jupiter Hammerheads	Florida State League	Luis Dorante
A	Greensboro Bats	South Atlantic League	Steve Phillips
A-Short Season	Jamestown Jammers	New York–Penn League	Benny Castillo
Rookie	GCL Marlins	Gulf Coast League	Tim Cossins

LEAGUE CHAMPIONS: Carolina
