= Michael Tejera =

Cuban baseball player & coach (born 1976)

- Pitcher
- Born: October 18, 1976 (age 49); Havana, Cuba
- Batted: Left Threw: Left

Professional debut
- MLB: September 8, 1999, for the Florida Marlins
- CPBL: May 29, 2010, for the Sinon Bulls

Last appearance
- MLB: June 9, 2005, for the Texas Rangers
- CPBL: July 10, 2010, for the Sinon Bulls

MLB statistics
- Win–loss record: 11–13
- Earned run average: 5.14
- Strikeouts: 172

CPBL statistics
- Win–loss record: 2–2
- Earned run average: 2.20
- Strikeouts: 10
- Stats at Baseball Reference

Teams
- Florida Marlins (1999, 2002–2004); Texas Rangers (2004–2005); Sinon Bulls (2010)

Career highlights and awards
- World Series champion (2003)

Michael Tejera (born October 18, 1976) is a Cuban former professional baseball pitcher and current pitching coach for the Harrisburg Senators. He played in Major League Baseball (MLB) for the Florida Marlins and Texas Rangers.

== Playoff appearances ==
Tejera made two playoff appearances in 2003 for the Florida Marlins, both in the NLCS against the Chicago Cubs. After pitching a scoreless inning in game two, he took the loss in game three. He gave up just one hit in the latter game, a single to Kenny Lofton in the 11th inning. Lofton came around to score on a triple by Doug Glanville, which turned out to be the winning run.

In the 2003 NLCS, Tejera threw a ball into the stands from the mound after a pitch slipped from his hand midway through his delivery.

After starting the 2009 season in the Mexican League, Tejera signed a minor league contract with the Cleveland Indians on July 10, 2009. He was let go at the end of the season, and in 2010 returned to the Mexican League with Tabasco.

== Coaching career ==
Tejera has served as the pitching coach for the Gulf Coast Nationals and Harrisburg Senators.

== See also ==
- List of baseball players who defected from Cuba
