= Tommy Phelps =

American baseball pitcher (born 1974)

- Pitcher
- Born: March 4, 1974 (age 52); Seoul, South Korea
- Batted: Left Threw: Left

MLB debut
- March 31, 2003, for the Florida Marlins

Last MLB appearance
- July 7, 2005, for the Milwaukee Brewers

MLB statistics
- Win–loss record: 4–5
- Earned run average: 4.34
- Strikeouts: 85
- Stats at Baseball Reference

Teams
- Florida Marlins (2003–2004); Milwaukee Brewers (2005)

Thomas Allen Phelps (born March 4, 1974) is an American former professional baseball pitcher. He played in Major League Baseball for the Florida Marlins and Milwaukee Brewers. He is currently a coach in the now Miami Marlins organization.

== Career ==
=== Playing career ===
He began his Major League Baseball (MLB) career in 2003 with the Florida Marlins, where he spent two seasons, pitching in 46 games, (starting 11) and winning four. Phelps was a member of the Marlins team that won the 2003 World Series, although he did not appear in the series. In 2005, he pitched in 29 games with the Milwaukee Brewers, recording no wins and two losses. In 2006, he signed a minor league deal with the New York Yankees and started 17 games for their Triple-A affiliate, the Columbus Clippers, finishing the season with a 7–4 record and a 4.45 ERA.

=== Coaching career ===
Phelps began his coaching career in 2008 as a minor league coach for the Yankees, eventually becoming the pitching coach for the Triple-A Scranton/Wilkes-Barre RailRiders. He is currently the assistant minor league pitching coordinator for the Miami Marlins.

== See also ==
- List of Major League Baseball players from South Korea
