= Brian Banks (baseball) =

American baseball player (born 1970)

- First baseman / Outfielder / Catcher
- Born: September 28, 1970 (age 55); Mesa, Arizona, U.S.
- Batted: Switch Threw: Right

Professional debut
- MLB: September 9, 1996, for the Milwaukee Brewers
- NPB: May 6, 2000, for the Fukuoka Daiei Hawks

Last appearance
- MLB: September 28, 2003, for the Florida Marlins
- NPB: August 11, 2000, for the Fukuoka Daiei Hawks

MLB statistics
- Batting average: .246
- Home runs: 13
- Runs batted in: 64
- Stats at Baseball Reference

Teams
- Milwaukee Brewers (1996–1999); Fukuoka Daiei Hawks (2000); Florida Marlins (2002–2003)

Career highlights and awards
- World Series champion (2003)

Brian Glen Banks (born September 28, 1970), is an American former professional baseball player. Banks hails from Mountain View High School and played first base, outfield, and catcher from 1993–2004. He played for the Florida Marlins and Milwaukee Brewers of Major League Baseball (MLB). Banks was a part of the 2003 World Series Champion Florida Marlins. He retired from professional baseball on August 20, 2004.

Following his baseball career, Banks returned to school and graduated in 2011 from the Arizona School of Dentistry and Oral Health. He now runs the Banks Pediatric Dentistry in Mesa, Arizona.

Banks is a member of the Church of Jesus Christ of Latter-day Saints.
