= Gerald Williams (baseball) =

American baseball player (1966–2022)

- Williams with the New York Yankees in 2001
- Outfielder
- Born: August 10, 1966; New Orleans, Louisiana, U.S.
- Died: February 8, 2022 (aged 55); Tampa, Florida, U.S.
- Batted: Right Threw: Right

MLB debut
- September 15, 1992, for the New York Yankees

Last MLB appearance
- October 2, 2005, for the New York Mets

MLB statistics
- Batting average: .255
- Home runs: 85
- Runs batted in: 365
- Stats at Baseball Reference

Teams
- New York Yankees (1992–1996); Milwaukee Brewers (1996–1997); Atlanta Braves (1998–1999); Tampa Bay Devil Rays (2000–2001); New York Yankees (2001–2002); Florida Marlins (2003); New York Mets (2004–2005)

Gerald Floyd Williams (August 10, 1966 – February 8, 2022) was an American professional baseball outfielder who played in Major League Baseball for the New York Yankees, Milwaukee Brewers, Atlanta Braves, Tampa Bay Devil Rays, and New York Mets from 1992 to 2005.

== Professional career ==
=== Draft and minor leagues ===
The New York Yankees selected Williams in the 14th round, with the 366th overall selection, of the 1987 Major League Baseball draft out of Grambling State University. In 1988, in the New York–Penn League for Oneonta, he batted .365/.447/.504 with two home runs in 115 at bats. He was then promoted to High-A ball where he hit .210 in the next two seasons. Playing in a league that is notoriously tough for hitters (Florida State League) he hit .289/.344/.461. Mid-season, he was sent up to AA and the Eastern League. There, he batted .250/.328/.435. Combined, he hit .265 with 140 hits, 20 home runs, 101 runs batted in (RBIs), and 37 stolen bases. For 1992, he hit .285/.334/.452 with 16 home runs, 86 RBIs, and 36 stolen bases.

=== New York Yankees (1992–1996) ===
Williams, at the age of 25 years, made his MLB debut September 15, 1992. After a brief stint in the minor leagues in 1993, Williams returned to the big leagues in 1994, but he was injured and played infrequently. He batted only .239. He had more opportunity to play off the bench in 1995 and batted .247 with six home runs in 182 at bats.

Williams saw more action in 1996, hitting .270 with five home runs in 233 at bats. He started in seventy games for the Yankees in left field that season, more than any other player. On May 1, he set a Yankees team record with six hits against the Baltimore Orioles in a 15-inning game. On May 14, in the top of the sixth inning against the Seattle Mariners, Williams made a running, back-handed catch in deep center field to rob Alex Rodriguez of an RBI double and preserve Dwight Gooden's no-hitter.

=== Milwaukee Brewers (1996–1997) ===
On August 23, 1996, the Yankees traded Williams and Bob Wickman to the Milwaukee Brewers for Graeme Lloyd, Pat Listach, and Ricky Bones. After the trade in 1996, Williams batted .207. For the season, Williams had 325 at bats, and batted .252 with 28 extra-base hits. Despite the trade, Williams received his first World Series Championship ring when the New York Yankees later won the series that year.

Williams was the regular center fielder for the Brewers in 1997 which was Williams' first season as a regular. With the Milwaukee Brewers that season, he batted .253 with 10 home runs, 41 RBI, 23 stolen bases, and 44 extra-base hits.

=== Atlanta Braves (1998–1999) ===
After the 1997 season, the Brewers acquired Marquis Grissom to be their new starting center fielder. They traded Williams to the Atlanta Braves for reliever Chad Fox. Williams then spent the 1998 and 1999 seasons as a semi-regular player for the Atlanta Braves, batting .286 with 27 home runs. In 1999, he played against his old team, the Yankees during the 1999 World Series, but the Braves lost the series in a four-game sweep.

=== Tampa Bay Devil Rays (2000–2001) ===
After the 1999 season, the Tampa Bay Devil Rays signed Williams to a two-year contract worth $5.75 million. In 2000, Williams set career highs with 21 home runs, 34 walks, 89 RBIs, 173 hits, 87 runs, and 30 doubles. Tampa Bay writers named Williams the team's most valuable player. On August 29, 2000, Williams was hit by a pitch thrown by Boston Red Sox pitcher Pedro Martínez. Williams charged the mound and started a bench-clearing brawl. During the brawl, he was one of eight members of the Rays ejected.

Williams began the 2001 season batting .207, and the Devil Rays released him on June 25.

=== New York Yankees (2001–2002) ===
Williams went back to the Yankees to finish the 2001 season and served as a backup outfielder. He remained on the postseason roster until the team lost the 2001 World Series to the Arizona Diamondbacks. In 2002, he spent most of the season in the minors, but played 33 games in the majors.

=== Florida Marlins (2003) ===
Williams signed a one-year contract for the Florida Marlins in 2003. He played 27 games and batted .129 overall. Williams got his second career World Series ring after the Marlins won the 2003 World Series over his former team, the New York Yankees. The Marlins signed Williams to a minor league contract for the 2004 season, but released him in April.

=== New York Mets (2004–2005) ===
In April 2004, Williams signed a minor league contract with the Mets. During his two years with the Mets, he batted .233 in 57 games in 2004 and batted .233 in 39 games in 2005.

== Personal life and death ==
Williams had 12 brothers and sisters. He resided in Tampa, Florida, and was one of the best friends of Yankee shortstop Derek Jeter. Jeter said of Williams that he "always looked out for me". During his playing career, The New York Times described him as Yankee outfielder Bernie Williams' best friend.

Williams was one of three Atlanta Braves to appear on Saturday Night Live when he made a cameo appearance alongside teammates Mark Wohlers and Pedro Borbón Jr. on the December 20, 1997 episode hosted by Helen Hunt.

Williams died of cancer on February 8, 2022, at the age of 55.

== See also ==
- List of Major League Baseball single-game hits leaders
