= List of Silver Slugger Award winners at pitcher =

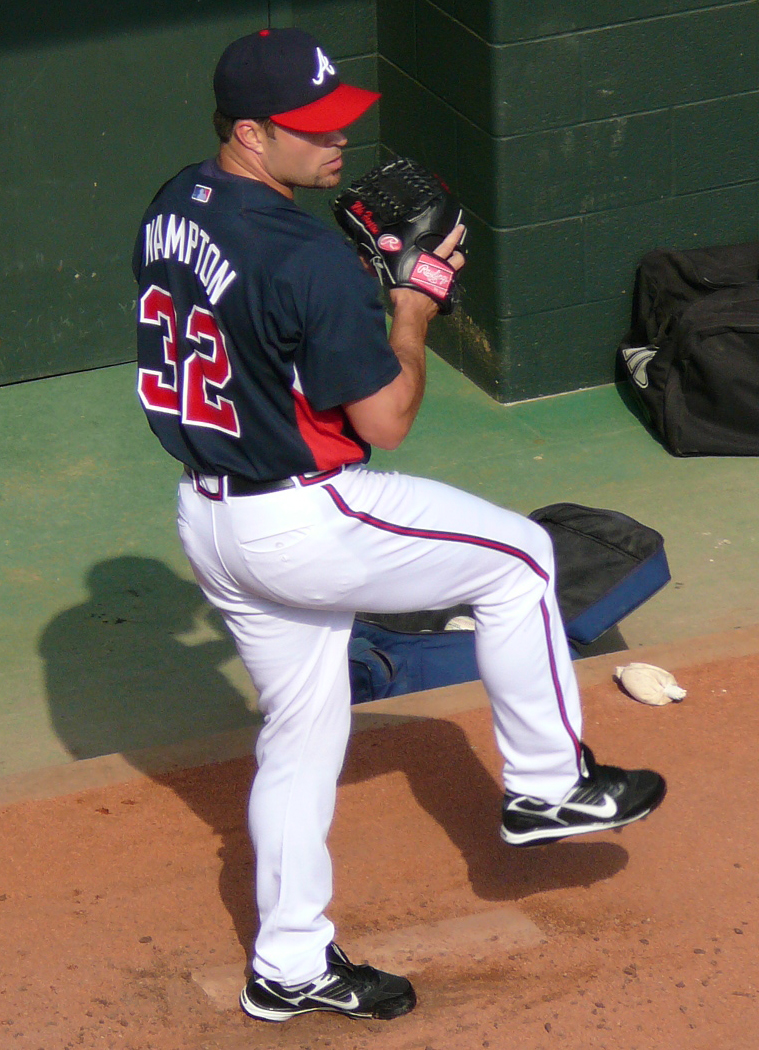
Mike Hampton has won five Silver Slugger Awards, best among all pitchers.

The Silver Slugger Award is awarded annually to the best offensive player at each position in both the American League (AL) and the National League (NL), as determined by the coaches and managers of Major League Baseball (MLB). These voters consider several offensive categories in selecting the winners, including batting average, slugging percentage, and on-base percentage, in addition to "coaches' and managers' general impressions of a player's overall offensive value". Managers and coaches are not permitted to vote for players on their own team. The Silver Slugger was first awarded in 1980 and is given by Hillerich & Bradsby, the manufacturer of Louisville Slugger bats. The award is a bat-shaped trophy, 3 feet (91 cm) tall, engraved with the names of each of the winners from the league and plated with sterling silver.

Only National League pitchers ever received a Silver Slugger Award; from the Silver Slugger Award's inception until 2019, and in 2021, a designated hitter generally took the place of the pitcher in the batting order in the National League. A Silver Slugger Award for designated hitters was given only in the American League during that time.

Mike Hampton has won the most Silver Sluggers as a pitcher, earning five consecutive awards with four different teams from 1999 to 2003. Tom Glavine is a four-time winner (1991, 1995–1996, 1998) with the Atlanta Braves. Rick Rhoden (1984–1986), Don Robinson (1982, 1989–1990), and Carlos Zambrano (2006, 2008–2009) each own three Silver Sluggers. Two-time winners include the inaugural winner, Bob Forsch (1980, 1987), Fernando Valenzuela (1981, 1983), who won the Cy Young Award, the Rookie of the Year Award, and the Silver Slugger in his first full major league season, and Madison Bumgarner (2014–2015).

Hampton has hit the most home runs in a pitcher's Silver Slugger-winning season, with seven in 2001. He is tied with Robinson as the leader in runs batted in, with 16 (Hampton, 2001; Robinson, 1982). Zack Greinke leads all Silver Slugger-winning pitchers in on-base percentage with a .409 clip set in 2013. Orel Hershiser leads winning pitchers in batting average, with the .356 mark he set in 1993. Micah Owings is the slugging percentage leader among winners (.683 in 2007).

In 2020, the use of the designated hitter was temporarily expanded to both leagues, and no Silver Slugger Award for a pitcher was given. In 2022, the use of the designated hitter was permanently allowed in both leagues, and the Silver Slugger Award for pitchers was retired. Max Fried was the final pitcher to win a Silver Slugger Award in 2021.

== Key ==
Year	Links to the corresponding Major League Baseball season
AVG	Batting average
OBP	On-base percentage
SLG	Slugging percentage
HR	Home runs
RBI	Runs batted in
Ref	References
*	Winner of the most Silver Sluggers in Major League Baseball as a pitcher
†	Member of the National Baseball Hall of Fame and Museum

== Winners ==
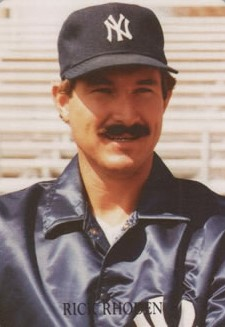
Rick Rhoden was the first player to win the Silver Slugger Award at pitcher in consecutive years.

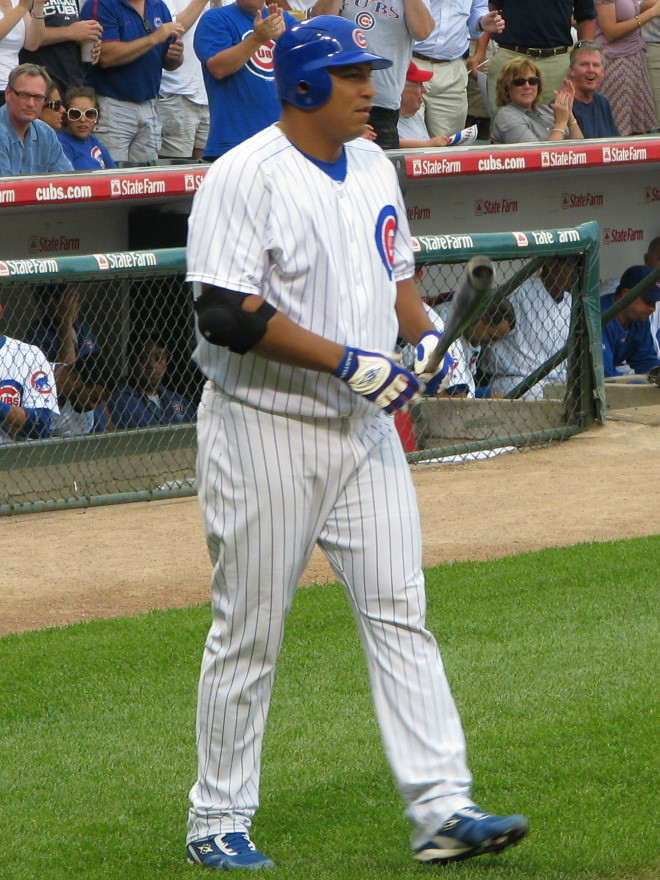
Carlos Zambrano is the most recent three-time winner of the Silver Slugger Award at pitcher.

Year	Player	Team	AVG	OBP	SLG	HR	RBI	Ref
1980	Bob Forsch	St. Louis Cardinals	.295	.313	.474	3	10	
1981	Fernando Valenzuela	Los Angeles Dodgers	.250	.262	.281	0	7	
1982	Don Robinson	Pittsburgh Pirates	.282	.311	.412	2	16	
1983	Fernando Valenzuela (2)	Los Angeles Dodgers	.187	.194	.253	1	9	
1984	Rick Rhoden	Pittsburgh Pirates	.333	.345	.405	0	4	
1985	Rick Rhoden (2)	Pittsburgh Pirates	.189	.211	.230	0	6	
1986	Rick Rhoden (3)	Pittsburgh Pirates	.278	.298	.411	1	10	
1987	Bob Forsch (2)	St. Louis Cardinals	.298	.333	.509	2	8	
1988	Tim Leary	Los Angeles Dodgers	.269	.286	.313	0	9	
1989	Don Robinson (2)	San Francisco Giants	.185	.195	.309	3	7	
1990	Don Robinson (3)	San Francisco Giants	.143	.143	.254	2	7	
1991	Tom Glavine^{†}	Atlanta Braves	.230	.288	.243	0	6	
1992	Dwight Gooden	New York Mets	.264	.274	.375	1	9	
1993	Orel Hershiser	Los Angeles Dodgers	.356	.373	.411	0	6	
1994	Mark Portugal	San Francisco Giants	.354	.360	.500	0	8	
1995	Tom Glavine^{†} (2)	Atlanta Braves	.222	.258	.286	1	8	
1996	Tom Glavine^{†} (3)	Atlanta Braves	.289	.333	.342	0	3	
1997	John Smoltz^{†}	Atlanta Braves	.228	.307	.266	0	4	
1998	Tom Glavine^{†} (4)	Atlanta Braves	.239	.250	.282	0	7	
1999	Mike Hampton*	Houston Astros	.311	.373	.432	0	10	
2000	Mike Hampton* (2)	New York Mets	.274	.313	.274	0	8	
2001	Mike Hampton* (3)	Colorado Rockies	.291	.309	.582	7	16	
2002	Mike Hampton* (4)	Colorado Rockies	.344	.354	.516	3	5	
2003	Mike Hampton* (5)	Atlanta Braves	.183	.246	.350	2	8	
2004	Liván Hernández	Montreal Expos	.247	.256	.370	1	10	
2005	Jason Marquis	St. Louis Cardinals	.310	.326	.460	1	10	
2006	Carlos Zambrano	Chicago Cubs	.151	.160	.397	6	11	
2007	Micah Owings	Arizona Diamondbacks	.333	.349	.683	4	15	
2008	Carlos Zambrano (2)	Chicago Cubs	.337	.337	.554	4	14	
2009	Carlos Zambrano (3)	Chicago Cubs	.217	.225	.464	4	11	
2010	Yovani Gallardo	Milwaukee Brewers	.254	.329	.508	4	10	
2011	Daniel Hudson	Arizona Diamondbacks	.277	.309	.369	1	14	
2012	Stephen Strasburg	Washington Nationals	.277	.333	.426	1	7	
2013	Zack Greinke	Los Angeles Dodgers	.328	.409	.379	0	4	
2014	Madison Bumgarner	San Francisco Giants	.258	.286	.470	4	15	
2015	Madison Bumgarner (2)	San Francisco Giants	.247	.275	.468	5	9	
2016	Jake Arrieta	Chicago Cubs	.262	.304	.415	2	7	
2017	Adam Wainwright	St. Louis Cardinals	.262	.279	.452	2	11	
2018	Germán Márquez	Colorado Rockies	.300	.300	.350	1	5	
2019	Zack Greinke (2)	Arizona Diamondbacks/Houston Astros	.271	.300	.583	3	8	
2020	Pitchers' Silver Slugger Award not given							
2021	Max Fried	Atlanta Braves	.273	.322	.327	0	5	
