= Tim Spooneybarger =

American baseball player

- Pitcher
- Born: October 21, 1979 (age 46); San Diego, California, U.S.
- Batted: Right Threw: Right

MLB debut
- September 5, 2001, for the Atlanta Braves

Last MLB appearance
- June 11, 2003, for the Florida Marlins

MLB statistics
- Win–loss record: 2–3
- Earned run average: 3.24
- Strikeouts: 68
- Stats at Baseball Reference

Teams
- Atlanta Braves (2001–2002); Florida Marlins (2003)

Timothy Floyd Spooneybarger (born October 21, 1979) is an American former professional baseball relief pitcher. He played in Major League Baseball (MLB) for the Atlanta Braves and Florida Marlins. He batted and threw right-handed.

== Career ==
=== Atlanta Braves ===
Spooneybarger was drafted by the Atlanta Braves in the 29th round, with the 881st overall selection, of the 1998 Major League Baseball draft. He spent three seasons in the minors (playing for the rookie-level Danville Braves, Single-A Macon Braves, High-A Myrtle Beach Pelicans, Double-A Greenville Braves and Triple-A Richmond Braves) where he compiled an outstanding record of 11 wins, 2 losses and 16 saves with a 1.79 ERA.

Spooneybarger made his major league debut with the Braves on September 5, 2001. He finished his rookie campaign with a 2.25 ERA across 4 contests. He spent most of the 2002 season in the majors recording a 2.63 ERA with 33 strikeouts and 1 save in 51 1/3 innings pitched across 51 games for the Braves.

=== Florida Marlins ===
On November 18, 2002, Spooneybarger was traded to the Florida Marlins along with minor league pitcher Ryan Baker for Mike Hampton.

He started 2003 with the Marlins, appearing in 33 games before going on the disabled list with elbow tendinitis; the team went on to win the 2003 World Series. Before beginning a rehabilitation assignment, he was forced to have Tommy John surgery and miss the entire 2004 season.

On July 20, 2005, while rehabilitating with the High-A Jupiter Hammerheads, he left the game due to pain and later learned he would have to undergo Tommy John surgery for a second time. On October 3, 2005, Marlins released Spooneybarger, and he would be out of professional baseball for the next two years.

=== Baltimore Orioles ===
On April 25, 2008, Spooneybarger signed a minor league contract with the Baltimore Orioles organization. In 6 games for the Low-A Aberdeen IronBirds, he posted a 3.68 ERA with 12 strikeouts in 7 1/3 innings pitched. Spooneybarger elected free agency following the season on November 3.

== Personal life ==
Spooneybarger plays in a rock band called Madder Ink with former Marlins teammate A. J. Burnett. The group is so named because Burnett and Spooneybarger both sport many tattoos.
