= Armando Almanza =

American baseball player (born 1972)

- Pitcher
- Born: October 26, 1972 (age 53); El Paso, Texas, U.S.
- Batted: Left Threw: Left

MLB debut
- July 29, 1999, for the Florida Marlins

Last MLB appearance
- July 20, 2005, for the Arizona Diamondbacks

MLB statistics
- Win–loss record: 14–13
- Earned run average: 4.82
- Strikeouts: 232
- Stats at Baseball Reference

Teams
- Florida Marlins (1999–2003); Atlanta Braves (2004); Arizona Diamondbacks (2005)

Armando N. Almanza (born October 26, 1972) is an American former left-handed relief pitcher, who last played for the Arizona Diamondbacks of Major League Baseball (MLB). He also played for the Florida Marlins and the Atlanta Braves. He was a hard-thrower, with a fastball in the mid-90s and a big, slow curveball, but had issues with his control his entire career. He was 6"3 and weighed approximately 240 pounds.

== Career ==
After attending Bel Air High School in his native El Paso, Texas, and then pitching for New Mexico Junior College, Almanza was selected by the St. Louis Cardinals in the 21st round of the 1993 MLB draft. Almanza pitched at the Rookie level in 1993 and missed the entire 1994 season, undergoing surgery to repair a ligament tear in his pitching elbow. He remained in the Cardinals minor league system until they traded him to the Florida Marlins after the 1998 season.

Going into the 1999 season, Almanza was expected to pitch at the Triple-A level with a chance to make the Marlins roster. However, he did not pitch well in spring training or early in the regular season, and he ended up with the Marlins' Double-A affiliate, the Portland Sea Dogs. However, after a short stint in Portland, Almanza was promoted directly from Double-A to the major leagues.

Almanza was still with the Florida Marlins when they upset the New York Yankees in the 2003 World Series. Almanza, however, did not get to participate in postseason play, as he had undergone season-ending arthroscopic surgery on his pitching elbow that August. The Marlins released Almanza in December 2003, and he was signed by the Atlanta Braves two days later.

Almanza's 2004 contract in Atlanta paid him a base salary of $500,000 with incentives that could have bumped up his earnings to $1.1 million, including a clause worth $100,000 if he stayed on the Braves active roster through the end of the season. Almanza played mostly in the minor leagues in 2004 and 2005, which were his last two seasons in professional baseball. He appeared in 13 games for the Braves in 2004 and 6 games for the Arizona Diamondbacks in 2005.
