= Mike Hampton =

American baseball player (born 1972)

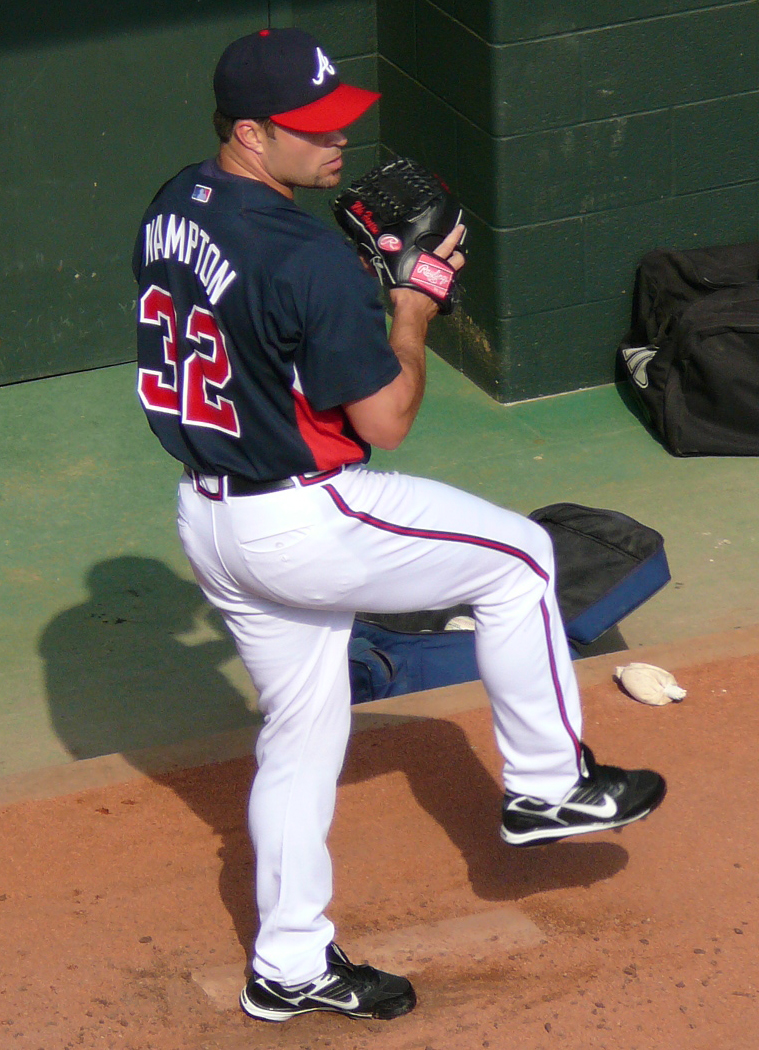
- Hampton with the Braves in 2008
- Pitcher
- Born: September 9, 1972 (age 54); Brooksville, Florida, U.S.
- Batted: Right Threw: Left

MLB debut
- April 17, 1993, for the Seattle Mariners

Last MLB appearance
- October 3, 2010, for the Arizona Diamondbacks

MLB statistics
- Win–loss record: 148–115
- Earned run average: 4.06
- Strikeouts: 1,387
- Stats at Baseball Reference

Teams
- Seattle Mariners (1993); Houston Astros (1994–1999); New York Mets (2000); Colorado Rockies (2001–2002); Atlanta Braves (2003–2005, 2008); Houston Astros (2009); Arizona Diamondbacks (2010)

Career highlights and awards
- 2× All-Star (1999, 2001); NLCS MVP (2000); Gold Glove Award (2003); 5× Silver Slugger Award (1999–2003); NL wins leader (1999)

Michael William Hampton, Jr. (born September 9, 1972) is an American former professional baseball player. Hampton played in Major League Baseball (MLB) as a pitcher from 1993 through 2010. He pitched for the Seattle Mariners, Houston Astros, New York Mets, Colorado Rockies, Atlanta Braves and Arizona Diamondbacks. He was the bullpen coach for the Mariners before resigning on July 9, 2017.

Hampton was named to two All-Star Games and won five Silver Slugger Awards and a Gold Glove Award. He was the Most Valuable Player of the 2000 National League Championship Series, and he pitched in the 2000 World Series for the Mets.

== Early life ==
Hampton was born in Brooksville, Florida, when his father, Mike Hampton Sr., was 19 and his mother, Joan, was 16. He was the oldest of three children. Hampton was raised in Homosassa, Florida, and attended Crystal River High School.

In high school, Hampton was recruited to play college football as a defensive back at Notre Dame, Miami and Florida State.

== Career ==
=== Seattle Mariners ===
Hampton was drafted by the Seattle Mariners in the sixth round of the 1990 Major League Baseball draft. He made his Major League debut in 1993. After the season, he was traded to the Houston Astros with Mike Felder for Eric Anthony.

=== Houston Astros ===
Hampton became a starter for Houston in 1995, and kept his ERA under 4.00 for every season he was with the Astros. In 1999, Hampton had his best year, finishing with a 22–4 record, best in the National League, and a 2.90 ERA. He picked up his first of five Silver Slugger Awards and narrowly finished second in National League Cy Young Award voting to Randy Johnson. That season, Hampton batted .311 (23 for 74).

=== New York Mets ===
Entering the final year of his contract, Hampton was dealt to the New York Mets. He went 15–10 with a 3.12 ERA and helped the Mets reach the postseason. With two wins and no earned runs in two starts, Hampton was named the MVP of the 2000 NLCS. Hampton received a loss in his only World Series appearance.

=== Colorado Rockies ===
The Colorado Rockies signed Hampton to an eight-year, $121 million contract on December 9, 2000. It was the largest contract in baseball history at the time, although it would quickly be passed by Alex Rodríguez's ten-year, $252 million contract with the Texas Rangers only two days later. Hampton once claimed that he had chosen to move to Colorado because of "the school system", a statement derided by baseball executive Sandy Alderson and sportswriters. The Rockies hoped Hampton, who had been one of the best pitchers in the league over the past few seasons, would be able to succeed in the tough pitching conditions of Coors Field.

Hampton went 14–13 with a 5.41 ERA in 2001, often struggling with control problems. He ranked 9th in the NL in walks issued. The next season, 2002, Hampton went 7–15 with his ERA climbing to a league-high 6.15 and batters hitting .313 off of him.

His best all-around offensive season came in 2001 with Colorado, when he would hit .291 with seven home runs. The next year he hit three home runs and batted .344, the third highest batting average for a pitcher in a season in the DH era. From 1999 to 2003, Hampton won five consecutive Silver Slugger Awards.

Coors Field at the time was one of the most hitter-friendly parks in MLB history during Hampton's tenure with the Rockies. Park-adjusted statistics such as ERA- and FIP- suggest Hampton was below average but not the worst pitcher in the majors while with the Rockies.

=== Atlanta Braves ===
On November 16, 2002, the Rockies traded Hampton to the Florida Marlins with Juan Pierre and cash for Charles Johnson, Preston Wilson, Vic Darensbourg, and Pablo Ozuna. Two days later, the Marlins traded Hampton and cash to the Atlanta Braves for Tim Spooneybarger and Ryan Baker. Hampton won 14 games and lowered his ERA to 3.84 in 2003. He won the Gold Glove Award for pitchers in 2003, the only player other than Greg Maddux to win the award for that position in the National League from 1990 to 2008. Moreover, in 2003, Hampton became the first pitcher to win both the Gold Glove and Silver Slugger during the same season. (Note: In 2019, Zack Greinke became the second pitcher to win a Gold Glove and Siler Slgger in the same season.) Hampton overcame a slow start in 2004 by winning 10 of his last 11 decisions and helping to propel the Braves to another division championship.

Hampton's 2005 season was limited heavily by injuries. He went 5–3 in 12 starts, but was lost for the rest of the season with an elbow injury on August 19, 2005. Hampton had Tommy John surgery on September 25, 2005, and missed the entire 2006 season rehabbing.

The Braves were hoping for Hampton to be ready to rejoin the rotation in time for the start of the 2007 season. The rehab was on schedule until Hampton tore his oblique muscle on March 7, 2007, which was to sideline him until at least May. Soon after, the Braves signed Mark Redman to be a left-handed starting pitcher for them in case Hampton was not able to return to action soon. After Hampton threw a bullpen session on April 8, the Braves shut Hampton down due to recurring elbow pain and said that he would see Dr. David Altchek, who had performed his Tommy John surgery in 2005. The next day, it was announced after having another left elbow procedure, that Hampton would miss the entire 2007 season.

Hampton began a rehab assignment on November 22, 2007, for Navojoa of the Mexican Winter League. In the first inning, he attempted to make a play on a comebacker and left during warmups before the second inning, feeling discomfort in his hamstring. The rest of his rehab was left in doubt.

However, Hampton reported to "Camp Roger" on time in late January. He threw off the mound for Bobby Cox and Roger McDowell, both of whom were impressed with Hampton's steady progress. Hampton arrived a day before pitchers and catchers were due to report at Lake Buena Vista. He ran sprints, played catch with teammates, continued to pitch off the mound, threw to live batters: Mark Kotsay, Tim Hudson, and Corky Miller.

On April 3, 2008, Hampton was scheduled to make his long-anticipated return to the Braves rotation in a game against the Pittsburgh Pirates. While warming up, however, Hampton strained his left pectoral muscle, and was placed on the 15-day disabled list. On July 26, Hampton made his first major league start since August 2005 against the Philadelphia Phillies. However, he was soon injured again, and finished the season with only 13 appearances. His final 2008 stats included a 3–4 record and a 4.85 ERA.

=== Houston Astros (second stint) ===
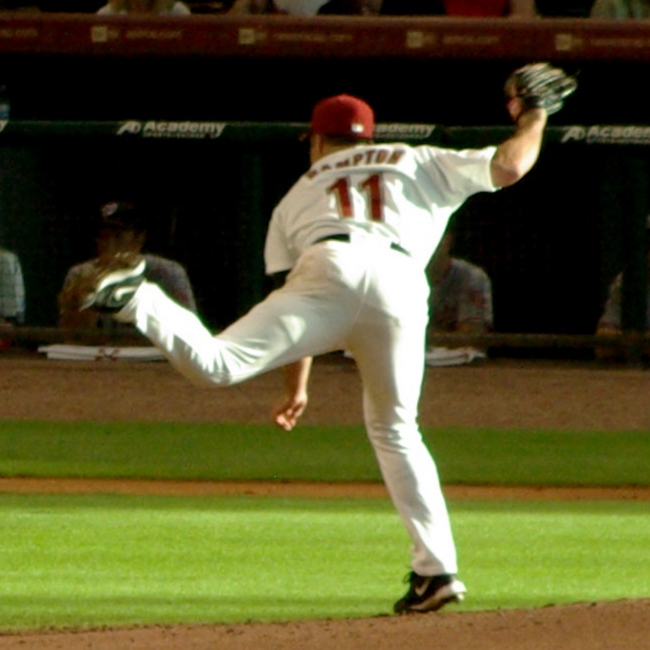
Hampton pitching for the Astros in 2009.

On December 3, 2008, Hampton signed a 1-year contract worth $2 million with the Houston Astros. Hampton could have earned another $2 million in performance-based incentives.

Hampton chose to wear uniform #11 in his return to Houston to honor his old friend, longtime Astro catcher Brad Ausmus. His #10 that he wore during his first stint with Houston was being worn by Miguel Tejada. He pitched in the number four spot behind Brian Moehler.

On September 15, 2009, Hampton underwent full rotator cuff surgery to repair a tear and was expected to miss the entire 2010 season.

=== Arizona Diamondbacks ===
Despite initially being expected to miss the whole season, on August 21, 2010, Hampton signed a minor league contract with the Arizona Diamondbacks. He returned to the major leagues with the Diamondbacks, throwing 4 1/3 innings in ten appearances.

After the season, Hampton re-signed with Arizona to a minor league deal for 2011. On March 26, 2011, Hampton announced his retirement from baseball.

=== Hitting stats ===
Hampton was one of the best hitting pitchers in MLB history. In 423 games over 16 seasons, Hampton posted a .246 batting average (178-for-725) with 97 runs, 22 doubles, 5 triples, 16 home runs, 79 RBI, 47 walks and a .356 slugging percentage. In 11 postseason games, Hampton batted .250 (5-for-20) with 1 run and 1 RBI.

== Coaching career ==
=== Los Angeles Angels of Anaheim organization ===
In 2013, Hampton was named the pitching coach for the Arkansas Travelers, the AA affiliate for the Angels, joining manager Tim Bogar, who was his teammate on the Astros from 1997 to 1999. Hampton was not retained as coach after the 2013 season.

=== Seattle Mariners ===
After two years off from coaching, he was hired to be the bullpen coach for the Mariners, the team he played for his rookie year. He joined former Astros teammates Scott Servais (1994–95) and the aforementioned Tim Bogar on the coaching staff. He resigned on July 9, 2017.

== Awards and accomplishments ==
- 2-time All-Star (1999, 2001)
- 2000 NLCS MVP
- Led NL in winning percentage (.8462, 1999)
- Became the first pitcher ever to win the Gold Glove Award and Silver Slugger Award in the same season (2003). The Gold Glove also snapped then-Atlanta teammate Greg Maddux's streak of 13 consecutive Gold Gloves. Hampton was the only National League pitcher other than Maddux to win a Gold Glove during Maddux's career from 1989 and onward.
- Hampton holds the record for most Silver Slugger awards for a pitcher, with five.

== See also ==
- Atlanta Braves award winners and league leaders
- List of Houston Astros team records
- Houston Astros award winners and league leaders
- List of Major League Baseball all-time leaders in home runs by pitchers
- New York Mets award winners and league leaders
