= Nate Bump =

American baseball player (born 1976)

- Pitcher
- Born: July 24, 1976 (age 50); Towanda, Pennsylvania, U.S.
- Batted: Left Threw: Right

MLB debut
- June 28, 2003, for the Florida Marlins

Last MLB appearance
- July 16, 2005, for the Florida Marlins

MLB statistics
- Win–loss record: 6–7
- Earned run average: 4.68
- Strikeouts: 79
- Stats at Baseball Reference

Teams
- Florida Marlins (2003–2005)

Career highlights and awards
- World Series champion (2003)

Nathan Louis Bump (born July 24, 1976) is an American former Major League Baseball relief pitcher who played for the Florida Marlins from 2003 to 2005.

== Biography ==
A native of Towanda, Pennsylvania, Bump attended Penn State University, and in 1996 he played collegiate summer baseball with the Cotuit Kettleers of the Cape Cod Baseball League. He was selected by the San Francisco Giants in the 1998 Major League Baseball draft as the 25th overall pick.

He was traded in 1999 by the Giants with Jason Grilli in exchange for Liván Hernández from the Florida Marlins. Bump played for the Marlins between 2003 and 2005, but was a free agent from 2006 to 2007. On July 26, 2004, Bump recorded his only MLB save. During a blowout victory against the Phillies, Bump pitched 3 shutout innings to close out an 11-3 Marlins victory.

In May 2008, Bump signed a minor league contract with the Giants and was assigned to their Double-A affiliate, the Connecticut Defenders. He became a free agent after the season, and was signed by the Camden Riversharks on April 6, 2009.

On July 3, 2009, Bump signed with the Detroit Tigers and was assigned to their Triple-A affiliate, the Toledo Mudhens. Bump became a free agent at the end of the season. On December 24, 2009, Bump signed a minor league contract with the Philadelphia Phillies. On November 2, 2011, Bump elected free agency.
