= Juan Encarnación =

Dominican baseball player (born 1976)

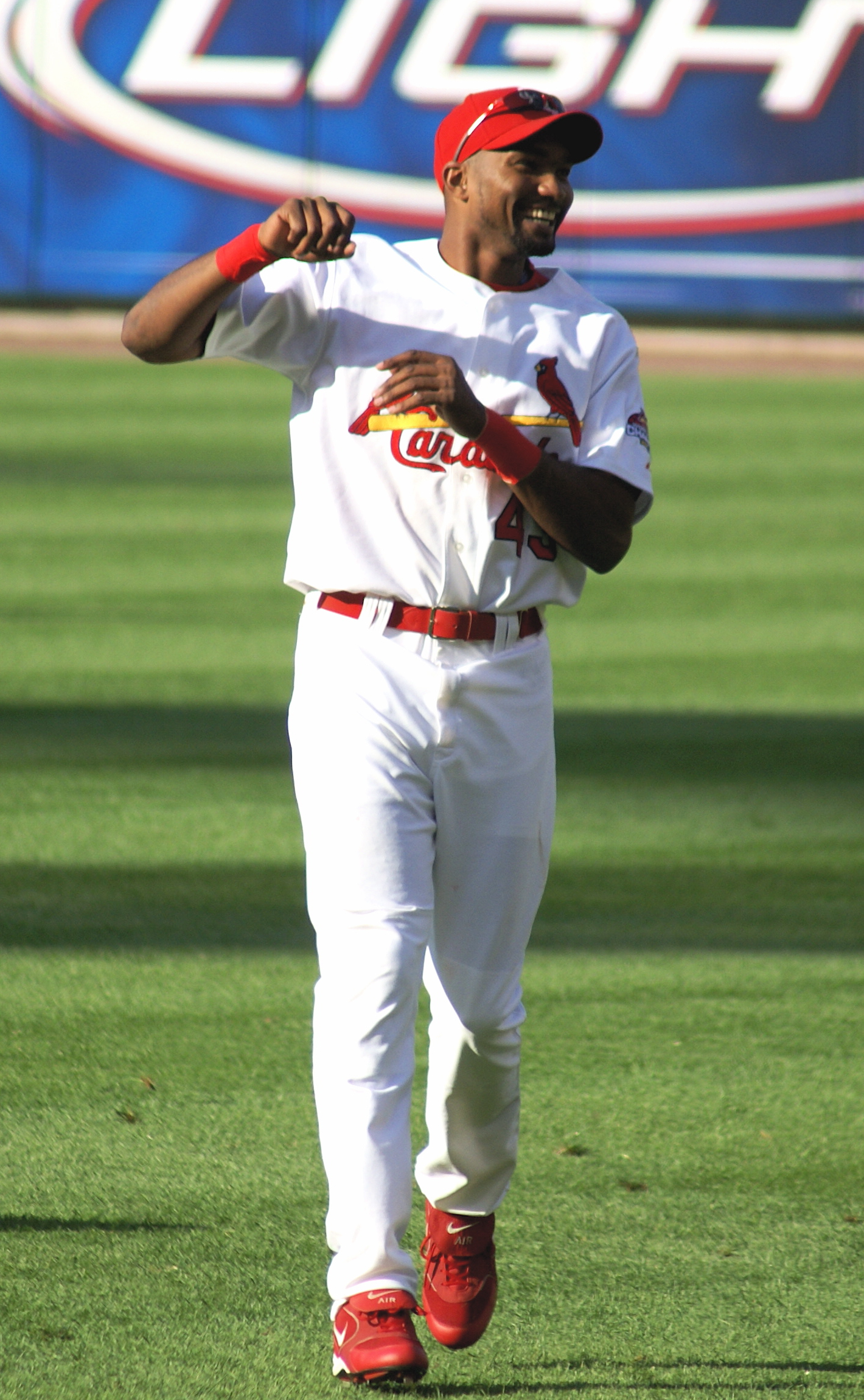
- Encarnacion with the St. Louis Cardinals
- Outfielder
- Born: March 8, 1976 (age 49); Las Matas de Farfán, Dominican Republic
- Batted: Right Threw: Right

MLB debut
- September 2, 1997, for the Detroit Tigers

Last MLB appearance
- August 30, 2007, for the St. Louis Cardinals

MLB statistics
- Batting average: .270
- Home runs: 156
- Runs batted in: 667
- Stats at Baseball Reference

Teams
- Detroit Tigers (1997–2001); Cincinnati Reds (2002); Florida Marlins (2002–2003); Los Angeles Dodgers (2004); Florida Marlins (2004–2005); St. Louis Cardinals (2006–2007)

Career highlights and awards
- 2× World Series champion (2003, 2006)

Juan De Dios Encarnación (born March 8, 1976) is a Dominican former professional baseball outfielder. He played 11 seasons in Major League Baseball (MLB) from 1997 to 2007 for the Detroit Tigers, Cincinnati Reds, Florida Marlins, Los Angeles Dodgers, and St. Louis Cardinals. Encarnación suffered a career-ending injury after getting hit in the eye by a foul ball on August 31, 2007.

== Career ==
Encarnación was signed by the Detroit Tigers as an amateur free agent in 1992, at age 17, and made his Major League debut in 1997 at age 21 for the Tigers. He was the fourth youngest player in the AL that year. He had two career best 19-game hitting streaks in 2000 with Detroit. Encarnación played for the Tigers until 2002, when he was traded and had his best season as a Cincinnati Red and Florida Marlin, hitting a career-high 24 home runs and driving in 85 runs. In 2003, he set two more career highs with 94 RBI and a team-leading 37 doubles on the way to a World Series ring after winning the 2003 World Series with Florida. He was then traded to the Los Angeles Dodgers in December of that year. He was traded back to Florida midway through the 2004 season along with Paul Lo Duca and Guillermo Mota for Brad Penny, Bill Murphy, and Hee-seop Choi after hitting a disappointing .235 in 86 games. Encarnación bounced back with a solid year in 2005, batting .287 with 16 homers and 76 runs batted in. He was also on the roster for the Dominican team in the inaugural World Baseball Classic. Encarnación signed a three-year contract with St. Louis on December 23, 2005, worth $15 million.

=== 2006 season ===
Encarnación finished the 2006 season, his first with the Cardinals, batting .278 with 19 home runs and 79 RBI for the Cards, with six steals. He led the Cardinals in games played (153) and at bats (557), was third in runs scored (74), second in hits (155), fourth in doubles (25), tied for first with Aaron Miles in triples (5), tied for fourth with Jim Edmonds in home runs (19), third in RBI (79), third in total bases (247), tied for eighth with Chris Duncan in walks (30), third in strikeouts (86), sixth in steals (6), second in caught stealing (5), 11th in on-base percentage (.317), sixth in slugging average (.443), and seventh in batting average (.278). He also had 265 putouts, four assists, and six errors in 275 total chances, for a .978 fielding percentage.

In the playoffs, he was 8-for-44 (.182) with two triples and five RBI. He hit an RBI triple in Game 4 of the NLDS which turned out to be the game-winner, as the Cardinals went on to beat the Padres, 6–4, winning the series. However, he struggled the rest of the postseason and sat the final three games of the World Series, in which the Cardinals defeated the Detroit Tigers 4–1. Encarnación confused many fans when he, without explanation, did not appear at the Cardinals' World Series victory parade. It is rumored that he was upset over not playing in Game 5 of the World Series. This marked the second time he has won a World Series but skipped the victory parade with the winning team; he also skipped the 2003 Florida Marlins World Series victory parade.

=== 2007 season ===
The 2007 season marked Encarnación's tenth in the major leagues and his second with the Cardinals. Before the season, he had surgery on his left wrist and was not ready for opening day. He started the year on the 15-day disabled list. Encarnación rehabbed first in Florida at extended Spring training, homering twice in three games. He did not appear in any games during regular Spring training. Next, he had a rehabilitation assignment at Double-A Springfield. He batted just .155 (9-for-58) with 4 doubles and 4 runs batted in during the assignment. He returned to the Cardinals on Mother's Day, May 13, playing right field vs. San Diego, going 0-for-3. From May 30 to June 18, Encarnación had an 18-game hitting streak, just one short of his career-high of 19, which he set in 2000. He lost some playing time after the emergence of pitcher-turned outfielder Rick Ankiel.

==== Eye injury ====
On August 31, Encarnación was struck in the face by a foul ball hit by teammate Aaron Miles while he was in the on-deck circle. Encarnación suffered multiple fractures to his left eye socket and an injury to his left eye and missed the remainder of the 2007 season.

On January 16, 2008 it was reported that he would miss the entire 2008 season, and the future of his career was in serious jeopardy. On May 2, 2008, during a web chat hosted by MLB and the St. Louis Cardinals for fans to talk with the team's new general manager, John Mozeliak, a question was asked regarding the possibility of Encarnación returning to the team. Mozeliak stated, "I'm sorry to say that he will not. His injury will likely result in his career ending."

== Life after baseball ==
In July 2009, a Dominican news organization reported that Encarnación was organizing a run to become a senator in the Dominican Republic, representing his home province of San Juan de la Maguana. The St. Louis Post-Dispatch later reported that the reports were unsubstantiated and without merit, and Encarnación had instead been working heavily on his charity, the Juan Encarnación Foundation. On February 7, 2011, Encarnación inaugurated the National Campaign Headquarters in San Juan de la Maguana of his independent Political Movement, M-12 in support of the PRD Party's Presidential Candidate, Miguel Vargas Maldonado. Encarnación was also the leader of the National Sports Committee for Miguel Vargas' Presidential Project as part of the National Board of Director of Independent Movements with Vargas.

== Records ==
- In 2003, he was one of just three outfielders without an error, along with Milwaukee's Geoff Jenkins and St. Louis' Orlando Palmeiro. He was also the first Marlins outfielder to post a 1.000 fielding percentage in their history.
- His stint of 227 errorless games in the outfield was the second-longest streak in baseball behind the Mets' Joe McEwing (228).
- He hit two grand slams in April 2005 (including one off Atlanta's John Smoltz on Opening Day), and became just the 16th player in history to record grand slams in their first two homers of the season. Encarnación only had one grand slam in his career prior to that.
