= Ugueth Urbina =

Venezuelan baseball player (born 1974)

- Pitcher
- Born: February 15, 1974 (age 52); Caracas, Venezuela
- Batted: Right Threw: Right

MLB debut
- May 9, 1995, for the Montreal Expos

Last MLB appearance
- October 2, 2005, for the Philadelphia Phillies

MLB statistics
- Win–loss record: 44–49
- Earned run average: 3.45
- Strikeouts: 814
- Saves: 237
- Stats at Baseball Reference

Teams
- Montreal Expos (1995–2001); Boston Red Sox (2001–2002); Texas Rangers (2003); Florida Marlins (2003); Detroit Tigers (2004–2005); Philadelphia Phillies (2005)

Career highlights and awards
- 2× All-Star (1998, 2002); World Series champion (2003); NL saves leader (1999)

Ugueth Urtaín Urbina Villarreal
- Born: February 15, 1974 (age 52); Caracas, Venezuela
- Status: Released
- Conviction: Found guilty on March 28, 2007
- Criminal charges: Attempted murder, illegal deprivation of liberty
- Penalty: 14 years in prison (served 7)

Ugueth Urtaín Urbina Villarreal (/uːˈɡɛt ʊərˈbiːnə/; born February 15, 1974) is a Venezuelan former relief pitcher in Major League Baseball. A two-time All-Star, Urbina led the National League in saves with 41 in the 1999 season and helped the Florida Marlins win the 2003 World Series. He is the only player in major league history with the initials "UU" or "UUU". His baseball career was cut short after the 2005 season, as he was arrested by Venezuelan authorities for attempted murder, for which he served seven years in prison.

== Playing career ==
In 11 major league seasons, Urbina compiled a 44–49 record with 237 saves, 814 strikeouts, and a 3.45 ERA. He played with the Montreal Expos (1995–2001), Boston Red Sox (2001–2002), Texas Rangers (2003), Florida Marlins (2003), Detroit Tigers (2004–2005), and Philadelphia Phillies (2005).

=== Montreal Expos (1995–2001) ===
Urbina started his career as a middle reliever with the Montreal Expos, where he pitched for six seasons and was an All-Star once, in 1998.

As a 21-year-old in 1995, Urbina made seven pitching appearances, starting four, and went 2–2 with a 6.17 ERA. In 1996 he established himself on Montreal's pitching staff, as he hurled 33 games, including 17 starts and a career-high 114 innings, and posted a 10–5 record with a 3.71 ERA. His career as a closer began In 1997, when he collected 27 saves with a 3.71 ERA and a 5–8 record in 63 relief appearances.

Urbina improved in 1998, going 6–3 with 34 saves and a 1.30 ERA in 64 games. In 1999, he topped the National League with 41 saves, while notching a 6–6 record and a 3.69 ERA in 71 contests. In 2000, Urbina was limited to 13 appearances and ended the year with an 0–1 mark, eight saves and a 4.05 ERA.

Urbina started the 2001 season well, going 2–1 with a 4.24 ERA while notching 15 saves in 45 games before being traded to the Boston Red Sox on July 31.

=== Boston Red Sox (2001–2002) ===
Urbina was headed to the Red Sox in the same transaction that sent Tomo Ohka and Rich Rundles to Montreal. Urbina appeared in 19 games with Boston, saving nine and compiling a 0–1 record with a 2.25 ERA. Overall, he went 2–2 with 24 saves and a 3.65 ERA in 64 relief opportunities.

Urbina earned his second All-Star berth in 2002, when he went 1–6 with 40 saves and a 3.00 ERA in 61 games.

=== Texas Rangers (2003) ===
Urbina signed as a free agent with the Texas Rangers on December 23, 2002. He went 0–4 with 26 saves and a 4.19 ERA in 39 games for the Rangers in 2003 before being traded during the midseason.

=== Florida Marlins (2003) ===
On July 11, 2003, Urbina was traded by Texas to the Florida Marlins in exchange for Adrián González, Ryan Snare, and a minor leaguer. For the remainder of the season, Urbina served as a setup man for Marlins closer Braden Looper, going 3–0 with six saves and a 1.41 ERA in 33 games. He posted a combined record of 3–4 with 32 saves and a 2.81 ERA in 54 appearances during the 2003 season.

Urbina finished his short stint with the Marlins by helping them win the 2003 World Series title, while defeating the New York Yankees in six games. During his only postseason in the majors, he went 1-0 along with four saves and a 3.46 ERA in 10 games.

=== Detroit Tigers (2004–2005) ===
Urbina signed a two-year contract with the Detroit Tigers on March 29, 2004. That marked his last year where he was closer for at least part of the season. In 54 games, he went 4–6 with 21 saves and a 4.50 ERA. He began the 2005 season in good form, collecting a 1–3 record with a 2.63 ERA while contributing with nine saves, but then found himself on the move again for the third time in his career.

=== Philadelphia Phillies (2005) ===
On June 8, 2005, the Tigers traded Urbina along with infielder Ramón Martínez to the Philadelphia Phillies in exchange for second baseman Plácido Polanco.

Urbina went 4–3 with a 4.13 ERA and one save in 56 games for the Phillies. Overall, he posted a 5–6 record with 10 saves and a 3.62 ERA in a career-high 81 games.

He made his last Major League appearance on October 2, 2005, during a 9–3 Phillies victory over the Washington Nationals at RFK Stadium.

== Pitching style ==
Urbina's pitches included a moving fastball and a slider that enabled him to hold left-handed hitters in check. He also threw a changeup which tailed away from right-handers and a splitter that broke sharply.

== Mother's kidnapping ==
In September 2004, Urbina's 54-year-old mother, Maura Villarreal, was kidnapped and held for a $6 million ransom in southwest Venezuela. Urbina's family refused to pay the ransom and an anti-kidnapping unit rescued her in a military-style operation on February 18, 2005.

== Attempted murder conviction ==
On November 7, 2005, Urbina was arrested in Venezuela for attempted murder, stemming from an incident on October 16. He assaulted five farm workers on his property, accusing them of stealing a gun. Urbina used a machete and tried to douse them with gasoline. On March 28, 2007, Urbina was convicted of attempted murder and sentenced to fourteen years and seven months in prison. He was released on December 24, 2012, after serving just over seven years of his sentence.

== Family ==
Urbina has a son Juan who pitched in the Mets organization, appearing in three seasons for the short season single-A Brooklyn Cyclones.

== See also ==
- List of Major League Baseball annual saves leaders
- List of Major League Baseball players from Venezuela
