= Braden Looper =

American baseball player (born 1974)

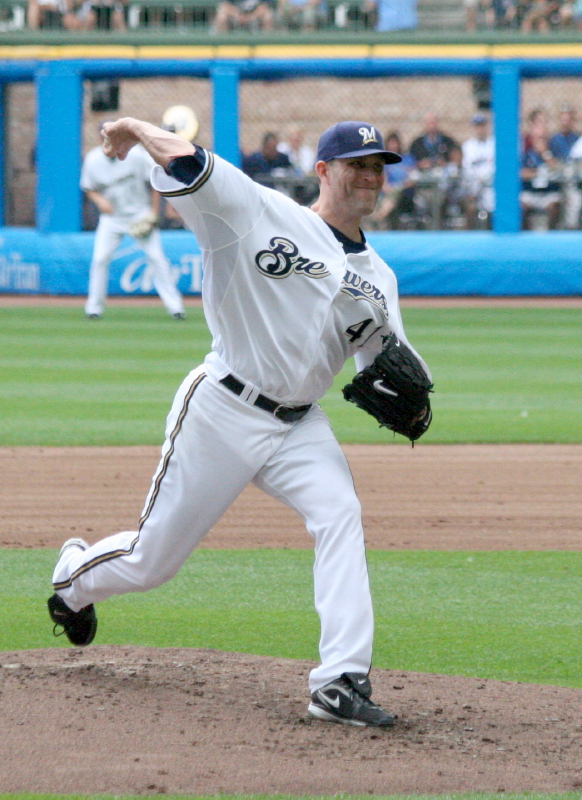
- Looper with the Milwaukee Brewers in 2009
- Pitcher
- Born: October 28, 1974 (age 51); Weatherford, Oklahoma, U.S.
- Batted: Right Threw: Right

MLB debut
- March 31, 1998, for the St. Louis Cardinals

Last MLB appearance
- October 2, 2009, for the Milwaukee Brewers

MLB statistics
- Win–loss record: 72–65
- Earned run average: 4.15
- Strikeouts: 669
- Saves: 103
- Stats at Baseball Reference

Teams
- St. Louis Cardinals (1998); Florida Marlins (1999–2003); New York Mets (2004–2005); St. Louis Cardinals (2006–2008); Milwaukee Brewers (2009)

Career highlights and awards
- 2× World Series champion (2003, 2006)
Medals
Men's baseball
Representing United States
Olympic Games
Bronze medal – third place	1996 Atlanta	Team

Braden LaVerne Looper (born October 28, 1974) is an American former Major League Baseball pitcher who played for several teams between 1998 and 2009.

== High school ==
Looper was a scholar athlete while a student at Mangum High School in Mangum, Oklahoma. He graduated in 1993 with four letters each in baseball and basketball, and two in football, while also a member of the National Honor Society.

== College and Olympics ==
Looper focused on baseball while attending Wichita State, and was inducted into their sports Hall of Fame in 2003. In 1994, he played collegiate summer baseball with the Cotuit Kettleers of the Cape Cod Baseball League. In 1996, he competed in the College World Series, and was a first-team All-American as a junior. Looper was also a member of the bronze medal-winning Team USA in the 1996 Olympics in Atlanta.

== Major leagues ==
=== St. Louis Cardinals ===
Looper was selected by the St. Louis Cardinals as the third pick in the first round of the 1996 Major League Baseball draft. He made his major league debut against the Los Angeles Dodgers on March 31, 1998, striking out the side in a relief appearance. After the 1998 season, he was traded to the Florida Marlins for shortstop Édgar Rentería.

=== Florida Marlins ===
Looper was inconsistent with the Marlins; despite working his way into the closer role, he had a penchant for blowing easy saves. Toward the end of the 2003 season, as the Marlins were in a pennant race that culminated in a World Series win, Looper faltered and was replaced as closer by Ugueth Urbina. Looper appeared in relief in the fourth game of the World Series, which went 12 innings. His performance gained him a win, as the Marlins won the game in the bottom of the 12th.

=== New York Mets ===
In January 2004, Looper signed with the New York Mets as a free agent and had his best season to date going 2–5 with 29 saves and a 2.70 ERA. However, Looper had many crucial blown saves during the 2005 season, including blown saves on Opening Day, in a game that would have clinched a Met sweep at Yankee Stadium and as part of an eight-run collapse by the Mets pen against the Nationals. These performances still fresh in fans' minds, he was greeted with loud boos and "Looper sucks!" chants upon his returns to Shea with the Cardinals, most prominently during the 2006 NLCS.

In September 2005, Looper underwent shoulder surgery to repair a blown AC joint. This, in addition to the emergence of Aaron Heilman and acquisition by the Mets of other relief pitchers, kept the Mets from picking up his $5 million option for 2006.

=== St. Louis Cardinals (second stint) ===
On December 15, 2005, Looper signed a three-year, $13.5M contract with the Cardinals to set up star closer and former Met Jason Isringhausen. He was part of the 2006 World Series winning St. Louis Cardinals team. Primarily an eighth inning setup man, Looper posted a 9–3 record as the team's bullpen wins leader.

Beginning in the 2007 season, Looper became a starting pitcher for the first time in his major league career. Before the season began, Looper stated that his goal was to reach 200 innings pitched in the season. In his first season as a starter, Looper reached career highs in wins (12), innings pitched (175), and strikeouts (84) in 30 starts (31 total appearances).

=== Milwaukee Brewers ===
On October 30, 2008, Looper filed for free agency. On February 12, 2009, Looper signed a one-year deal with an option for 2010 with the Milwaukee Brewers. Although Looper had a 14–7 record in 2009, he led the major leagues by allowing 113 earned runs. After the season the Brewers did not pick up the option on Looper for 2010, making him a free agent.

=== Retirement ===
After not pitching in the 2010 season, Looper was a non-roster invitee of the Chicago Cubs to spring training as a candidate to be either a starter or reliever on the team. Looper had stated that the Cubs were the only team he would attempt a comeback with. However, on March 25, Looper was informed he would not make the opening day roster, and he retired.
