= Chad Fox =

American baseball player (born 1970)

- Pitcher
- Born: September 3, 1970 (age 55); Conroe, Texas, U.S.
- Batted: Right Threw: Right

MLB debut
- July 13, 1997, for the Atlanta Braves

Last MLB appearance
- May 9, 2009, for the Chicago Cubs

MLB statistics
- Win–loss record: 10–12
- Earned run average: 3.79
- Strikeouts: 262
- Stats at Baseball Reference

Teams
- Atlanta Braves (1997); Milwaukee Brewers (1998–1999, 2001–2002); Boston Red Sox (2003); Florida Marlins (2003–2004); Chicago Cubs (2005, 2008–2009)

Career highlights and awards
- World Series champion (2003)

Chad Douglas Fox (born September 3, 1970) is an American former Major League Baseball pitcher. Fox played for the Atlanta Braves, Milwaukee Brewers, Boston Red Sox, Florida Marlins, and the Chicago Cubs. He won the 2003 World Series as a member of the Marlins. He is also known for his injuries that have set him back in his career, undergoing Tommy John surgery twice, including having been injured in the 2004 and 2005 seasons. He has reached 50 innings—the minimum standard for a rookie season—only twice in his career, and threw fewer than 11 innings in the majors nine times between 1999 and 2009. He now teaches players of all ages at Woodlands Baseball Academy Facility in The Woodlands, Texas.

== Amateur career ==
Fox attended Tarleton State University.

== Professional career ==
The Cincinnati Reds drafted Fox in the 23rd round of the 1992 Major League Baseball draft. He was traded to the Atlanta Braves in 1996 with a player to be named later (Ray King) for Mike Kelly.

=== Milwaukee Brewers ===
Fox was traded to the Brewers for Gerald Williams in 1997.

Fox's best season came in 2001, after not pitching in the majors at all the year before. Fox was voted the Brewers Most Valuable Pitcher. Taking on a setup role, Fox threw a career-best 66 2/3 innings, posting a 5-2 record and 1.89 ERA while striking out 80. This would be his last injury-free season in the majors.

=== Boston Red Sox, Florida Marlins ===
Fox would face rehab stints in 2002 with the Brewers and 2003 with the Red Sox, though he managed to stay healthy after signing with the Florida Marlins in August 2003, posting a 2.13 ERA in 21 appearances and adding nine more outings in the postseason to help them to a World Series title. He returned to the Marlins in 2004, but was ineffective in 12 April appearances before being shut down the rest of the season with ulnar neuritis. He was equally ineffective trying to return the following season with the Chicago Cubs, this time throwing just eight innings before reinjuring his throwing elbow on April 26, 2005. This injury would temporarily end his career.

=== Chicago Cubs ===
On January 11, 2008, he signed a one-year minor league deal with the Chicago Cubs hoping to make a comeback. After several rehab starts with the Cubs' A and AA affiliates, Fox was added to the 25-man major league roster on May 2. After a three-year absence he made his major league comeback debut on May 2, 2008 against the St. Louis Cardinals. He went 1-2-3 in the bottom of the 10th inning but gave up a 2-run home run in the 11th inning to take the loss.

He would go on to make appearances on May 5 and May 11, throwing two scoreless innings before returning to the disabled list on May 20 with ulnar neuritis. Fox opted to rest rather than undergo another surgery on his elbow, but was ultimately transferred to the 60-day disabled list on September 2, ending his season. In the offseason, he was re-signed by the Cubs to a minor league contract for 2009.

On May 9, 2009; in the bottom of the 8th inning in a game against the Milwaukee Brewers, Fox threw a wild pitch and, coming up in obvious pain, was removed from the game. He retired as a result.
