= Mark Redman =

American baseball player (born 1974)

- Pitcher
- Born: January 5, 1974 (age 52); San Diego, California, U.S.
- Batted: Left Threw: Left

MLB debut
- July 24, 1999, for the Minnesota Twins

Last MLB appearance
- July 13, 2008, for the Colorado Rockies

MLB statistics
- Win–loss record: 68–85
- Earned run average: 4.85
- Strikeouts: 747
- Stats at Baseball Reference

Teams
- Minnesota Twins (1999–2001); Detroit Tigers (2001–2002); Florida Marlins (2003); Oakland Athletics (2004); Pittsburgh Pirates (2005); Kansas City Royals (2006); Atlanta Braves (2007); Colorado Rockies (2007–2008)

Career highlights and awards
- All-Star (2006); World Series champion (2003)

Mark Allen Redman (born January 5, 1974) is an American former professional baseball left-handed starting pitcher. He played in Major League Baseball (MLB) for the Minnesota Twins, Detroit Tigers, Florida Marlins, Oakland Athletics, Pittsburgh Pirates, Kansas City Royals, Atlanta Braves, and Colorado Rockies.

== Early career ==
A 1992 graduate of Escondido High School in California, he played baseball and football before attending The Master's College in Santa Clarita, California for one year and then transferring to the University of Oklahoma.

In his sophomore year at Oklahoma, Redman set school records for strikeouts (136) and innings pitched (135.1) during the regular season and posted a 5-0 record in post-season play as he helped the Sooners win the 1994 College World Series title.

Redman named 1st Team All-Big Eight, Big Eight Newcomer of the Year, NCAA All-Regional team and was a member of the College World Series All-Tournament team in 1994. In addition, he was selected as a 1st Team All-American in both of his seasons at Oklahoma.

== Professional career ==
Redman was selected by Detroit Tigers in 41st Round (1,148th overall) of the 1992 Major League Baseball draft, but did not sign with the team. He would get drafted again in 1995 by the Minnesota Twins in the 1st Round (13th overall).

=== Minnesota Twins ===
He would make his Major League debut with the Minnesota Twins on July 24, 1999, pitching 4 2/3 innings, giving up 3 runs, and totaling 3 strikeouts and 3 walks, in 10–3 victory over the Seattle Mariners. Following his debut, he would be sent back down to the minors, before returning to the majors in mid-September, making 4 appearances out of the bullpen, where he gave up 10 runs in 8 innings pitched.

In 2000, Redman was named to the opening day roster, and began the season coming out of the bullpen again, before moving into the starting rotation in May, going on to make 24 starts for the Twins, finishing with a 12–9 record with a 4.76 ERA over 151 1/3 innings. He would finish in a 4-way tie for 6th place in AL Rookie of the Year voting, receiving a single vote.

The following season he made 9 starts for Minnesota, going 2–4 with a 4.22 ERA over 49 innings before being traded to the Detroit Tigers at the trade deadline.

=== Detroit Tigers ===
On July 28, 2001, Redman was traded to the Detroit Tigers in exchange for All-Star pitcher Todd Jones. He only made 2 starts for Detroit following the trade due to a triceps injury. The next year in 2002, his lone full season with the Tigers, he made 30 starts for the first time and finished with an 8–15 record with a 4.21 ERA in 203 innings.

=== Florida Marlins ===
In the offseason, Redman was traded to the Florida Marlins along with prospect Jerrod Feull in exchange for top 10 prospect Rob Henkel as well as Gary Knotts and Nate Robertson. In 2003, Redman had a career year, setting career highs in wins (14), ERA (3.59), and strikeouts (151). The Marlins would go on to win 2003 World Series over the New York Yankees, despite Redman struggling throughout the postseason. In his 4 postseason starts, Redman went 0–1 with 6.50 ERA in 18 innings, including his lone start in the World Series, where he only lasted 2 1/3 innings, giving up 5 hits and 4 runs, in the eventual 6–1 loss in Game 2.

=== Oakland Athletics ===
After the 2003 World Series, the Marlins traded Redman to the Oakland Athletics in exchange for Mike Neu and a player to be named later (Bill Murphy was eventually added to the deal, 7 days later). Following the trade, Redman became a free agent, and re-signed with the Athletics on a 3-year deal worth $12 million. He finished his lone season with the team with an 11–12 record and a 4.71 ERA over 191 innings.

=== Pittsburgh Pirates ===
On November 27, 2004, Redman was traded to the Pittsburgh Pirates along with Arthur Rhodes in exchange for former All-Star catcher Jason Kendall. Redman endured his worst statistical season, finishing 5–15 for the last place Pirates. He had a 4.90 ERA in 30 starts.

=== Kansas City Royals ===
Following that poor 2005 season, Redman was once again traded in the offseason, this time to the Kansas City Royals. Redman was chosen to the American League squad in the 2006 Major League Baseball All-Star Game as the Royals' lone representative, but he did not play. His selection was considered to be "one of the worst All-Star selections ever", with Hall of Famer Joe Morgan using Redman's selection as a reason why every team should not be guaranteed an All-Star. He was 6–4 with an ERA of 5.27 at the All-Star break. He would finish the season with a team-high 11 wins and a 5.71 ERA in 167 innings.

=== Atlanta Braves ===
On March 9, 2007, he signed a minor league deal with the Atlanta Braves. On March 26, the Braves purchased Redman's contract from the Triple-A Richmond Braves. Redman struggled mightily to open the season, pitching in 3 of the Braves' first 5 losses of the season. Through the first month of the season, Redman was 0–3 with a 10.13 ERA in only 18 2/3 innings. In his next start on May 1, Redman only lasted 1 2/3 innings, giving up 5 hits and 4 runs, picking up another loss, moving him to 0–4 on the year, and increasing his season ERA to 10.62. The following day, it was reported that he would be undergoing surgery for an ingrown toenail. He would make one final appearance for Atlanta on May 19, coming on in relief in the first game of a doubleheader against the Boston Red Sox, where he pitched 1 1/3 innings, and gave up 4 hits and 4 runs, raising his ERA to 11.63.

3 days later, the Braves released him on May 22.

=== Colorado Rockies ===
After being released by the Braves, he signed on to minor league deals with Texas and Toronto, who ultimately both released him. He would later join his fourth organization in 2007 when he signed a minor league contract with the Colorado Rockies on August 20. He was assigned to the Double-A Tulsa Drillers and made a start that same day. On August 25, he was promoted to their Triple-A affiliate, the Colorado Springs Sky Sox. On September 7, Mark Redman was promoted to the Rockies and made an emergency replacement after Elmer Dessens went down in the 2nd inning with a hamstring injury.

Redman made 5 appearances for Colorado in September, 3 of which were starts. He went 2–0 with a 3.20 ERA in 19 2/3 innings. Despite his success down the stretch, Redman was left off the Rockies postseason roster, they eventually advanced to the franchise's first and only World Series, where they were swept by the Boston Red Sox.

Over 11 games between Atlanta and Colorado, Redman had a cumulative record of 2–4 with a 7.62 ERA in 41 1/3 innings.

On December 13, 2007, he re-signed with the Rockies on a 1-year, $1 million contract.

On April 26, 2008 at Dodger Stadium, Redman became the first MLB starter since 1900 to give up 10 or more runs in the first inning and still complete the inning, allowing 10 earned runs and managing to follow it with 5 scoreless innings before finishing for the day.

On July 18, 2008, Redman was designated for assignment. He was subsequently sent down to Triple-A Colorado Springs on July 22, 2008.

In his final major league season, Redman went 2–5 with a 7.54 ERA in 45 1/3 innings.
