= 2003 World Series =

99th edition of Major League Baseball's championship series

Team (Wins)	Managers	Season
Florida Marlins (4)	Jack McKeon	91–71 (.562), GB: 10
New York Yankees (2)	Joe Torre	101–61 (.623), GA: 6
- Dates: October 18–25
- Venue(s): Yankee Stadium (New York); Pro Player Stadium (Florida)
- MVP: Josh Beckett (Florida)
- Umpires: Randy Marsh (crew chief), Larry Young, Gary Darling, Jeff Kellogg, Ed Rapuano, Tim Welke
- Hall of Famers: Marlins: Iván Rodríguez; Yankees: Derek Jeter; Mike Mussina; Mariano Rivera; Joe Torre (manager)

Broadcast
- Television: Fox (United States); MLB International (International)
- TV announcers: Joe Buck and Tim McCarver (Fox); Gary Thorne and Ken Singleton (MLB International)
- Radio: ESPN; WQAM (FLA); WCBS (NYY)
- Radio announcers: Jon Miller and Joe Morgan (ESPN); Dave Van Horne and Jon Sciambi (WQAM); John Sterling and Charley Steiner (WCBS)
- ALCS: New York Yankees over Boston Red Sox (4–3)
- NLCS: Florida Marlins over Chicago Cubs (4–3)

The 2003 World Series (also known as the Centennial World Series) was the championship series of Major League Baseball's (MLB) 2003 season. The 99th edition of the World Series, it was a best-of-seven playoff between the National League (NL) champion Florida Marlins and the American League (AL) champion New York Yankees; the Marlins upset the heavily-favored Yankees, four games to two. The series was played from October 18 to 25, 2003. This was the most recent Series in which the losing team outscored the winning team until 2025; the Yankees lost, despite outscoring the Marlins 21–17 in the Series. This was the Marlins' second World Series championship win, having won their first in 1997. The Marlins would not return to the postseason until 2020.

== Background ==
The 2003 World Series featured the New York Yankees in their sixth Series appearance in eight years. Opposing them were the wild card Florida Marlins, appearing in their second World Series in their 11-year franchise history. The Marlins became the second straight wild card team to win the World Series; the Anaheim Angels won in 2002. The series was, however, somewhat overshadowed by the League Championship Series that year, when the Chicago Cubs and the Boston Red Sox, both teams that had gone decades without winning a World Series (95 years for Chicago, 85 for Boston), went down in dramatic defeats only five outs away from the pennant, and each in seven games. By losing the series, the Yankees became the first team to lose two World Series to post 1960 expansion teams; losing to the Arizona Diamondbacks, who entered the National League in 1998, in the 2001 World Series and now the Marlins who entered the National League in 1993.

It was the 100th anniversary of the World Series, and advertised as such. However, it was only the 99th event due to a strike cancelling the 1994 World Series and the boycott of the 1904 World Series by the National League.

The Marlins started the season 16–22 when they fired manager Jeff Torborg and hired McKeon, who had been retired from baseball for over two years. They went 75–49 under McKeon to win the wild card. At 72, McKeon would become the oldest manager to win a World Series. They lost the first game of the National League Division Series to the San Francisco Giants, but came back to win the final three. After going down three games to one to the Cubs in the National League Championship Series, they rallied to win the final three games. In the World Series, the Marlins put up their young roster with a $54 million payroll up against the storied Yankees and their $164 million payroll. By facing the Marlins, the Yankees faced every team in the National League that had won a National League pennant. Since then, the 2005 Houston Astros, 2007 Colorado Rockies and the 2019 Washington Nationals have reached the World Series without facing the Yankees (although the Astros would face the Yankees in the postseason after their switch to the American League in 2013).

The 2003 Marlins were largely led by players picked up in the Marlins' post-1997 championship fire sale, such as Derrek Lee, A. J. Burnett, Braden Looper, Mike Lowell, Josh Beckett, and Juan Pierre.

== Broadcasting ==
Fox again provided coverage of the World Series on American television. Joe Buck and Tim McCarver broadcast the series for Fox. National radio coverage was provided by ESPN Radio, with Jon Miller and Joe Morgan calling the action.

The Marlins' local broadcast aired on WQAM in Miami and on the Marlins Radio Network. Jon Sciambi and Dave Van Horne were in the booth. The Yankees' local broadcast was carried by WCBS-AM and the New York Yankees Radio Network, with John Sterling and Charley Steiner broadcasting.

== Summary ==
The Yankees had been awarded home-field advantage for this World Series, because the AL won the 2003 All-Star game. MLB had alternated home-field advantage for the World Series between the two leagues prior to this, and the NL would have been due for home-field in 2003 before the change.

Florida won the series, 4–2.

Game	Date	Score	Location	Time	Attendance
1	October 18	Florida Marlins – 3, New York Yankees – 2	Yankee Stadium	3:43	55,769
2	October 19	Florida Marlins – 1, New York Yankees – 6	Yankee Stadium	2:56	55,750
3	October 21	New York Yankees – 6, Florida Marlins – 1	Pro Player Stadium	3:21 (:39 delay)	65,731
4	October 22	New York Yankees – 3, Florida Marlins – 4 (12)	Pro Player Stadium	4:03	65,934
5	October 23	New York Yankees – 4, Florida Marlins – 6	Pro Player Stadium	3:05	65,975
6	October 25	Florida Marlins – 2, New York Yankees – 0	Yankee Stadium	2:57	55,773

== Matchups ==
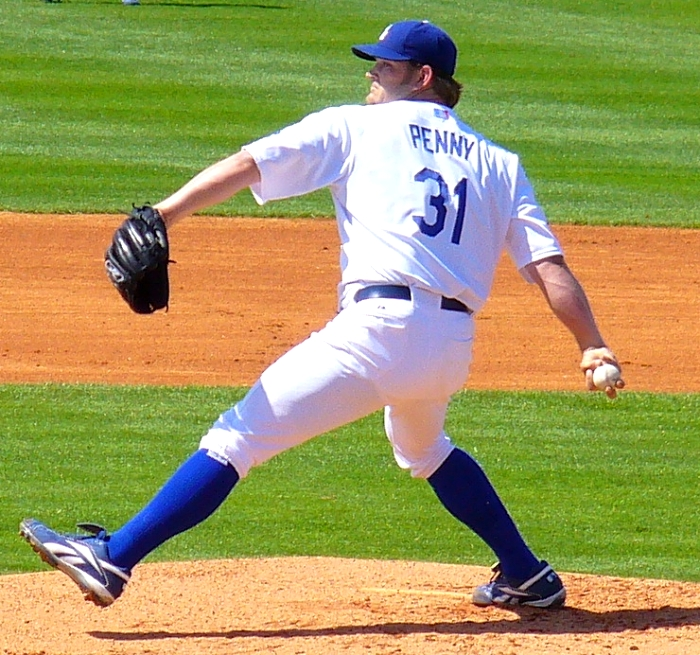
Brad Penny, the winning pitcher in Game 1.

=== Game 1 ===
October 18, 2003 8:06 pm (EDT) at Yankee Stadium in Bronx, New York 50 °F (10 °C), cloudy
Team	1	2	3	4	5	6	7	8	9	R	H	E
Florida	1	0	0	0	2	0	0	0	0	3	7	1
New York	0	0	1	0	0	1	0	0	0	2	9	0
WP: Brad Penny (1–0) LP: David Wells (0–1) Sv: Ugueth Urbina (1); Home runs: FLA: None; NYY: Bernie Williams (1); Boxscore

A trio of Marlins pitchers managed to keep the Yankees in check. Brad Penny, Dontrelle Willis, and Ugueth Urbina held New York to two runs. Juan Pierre scored Florida's first run in the first on Iván Rodríguez's sacrifice fly and drove in the other two with a two-run single in the fifth after Jeff Conine and Juan Encarnación reached base and advanced on a sacrifice bunt. The Yankees scored on a single by Derek Jeter in the third and a home run by Bernie Williams in the sixth, the 18th postseason home run of his career, tying a mark shared by Reggie Jackson and Mickey Mantle.

Urbina ran into immediate trouble in the ninth, walking Jason Giambi to lead off the inning and, one out later, walking pinch-hitter Rubén Sierra to put pinch-runner David Dellucci in scoring position. However, Alfonso Soriano was called out looking on a 3–2 pitch and Nick Johnson flied out to center to end the game.

David Wells pitched seven solid innings for New York in a losing effort. The defeat marked the first Yankees loss of a home World Series contest since Game 2 of the 1996 World Series.

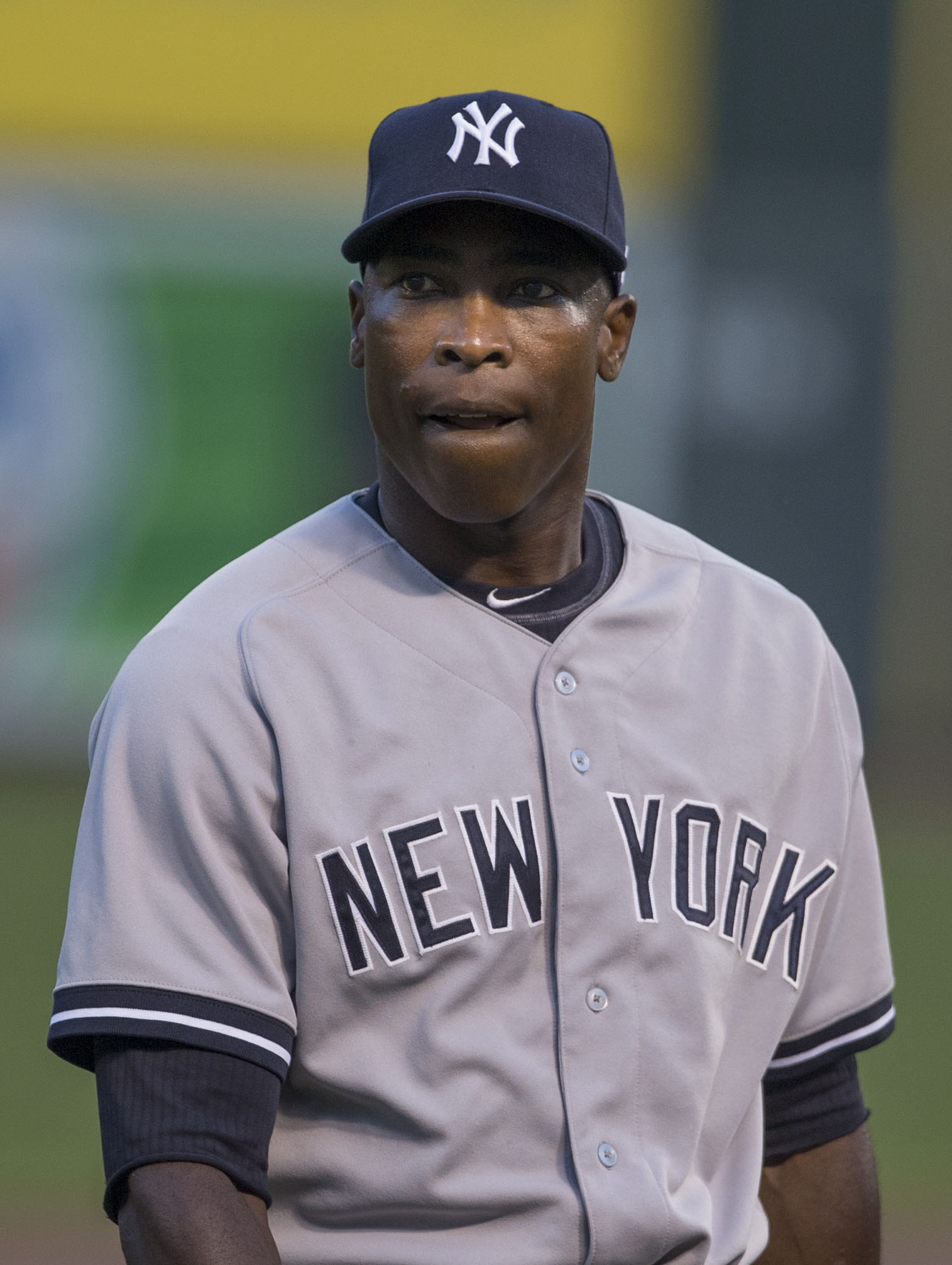
Alfonso Soriano hit a two-run home run in the fourth inning of Game 2 to ice the game for the Yankees.

=== Game 2 ===
October 19, 2003 8:00 pm (EDT) at Yankee Stadium in Bronx, New York 48 °F (9 °C), clear
Team	1	2	3	4	5	6	7	8	9	R	H	E
Florida	0	0	0	0	0	0	0	0	1	1	6	0
New York	3	1	0	2	0	0	0	0	X	6	10	2
WP: Andy Pettitte (1–0) LP: Mark Redman (0–1); Home runs: FLA: None; NYY: Hideki Matsui (1), Alfonso Soriano (1); Boxscore

The Yankees bounced back behind the arm of Andy Pettitte who allowed only six hits and one walk in 8 2/3 innings. He allowed only one unearned run on a single by Derrek Lee in the ninth. The Yankees' Hideki Matsui hit a three-run home run in the first inning on a 3–0 pitch, becoming the first Japanese player to hit a home run in a World Series, and also became the second Japanese player to play a World Series game. Nick Johnson hit a bunt single in the second with one out and scored on Juan Rivera's double with Rivera being tagged out at third. Alfonso Soriano hit a two-run shot off reliever Rick Helling in the fourth. Florida's starter Mark Redman lasted only 2 1/3 innings while allowing four runs. It would be the last World Series game won by the Yankees at the old Yankee Stadium.

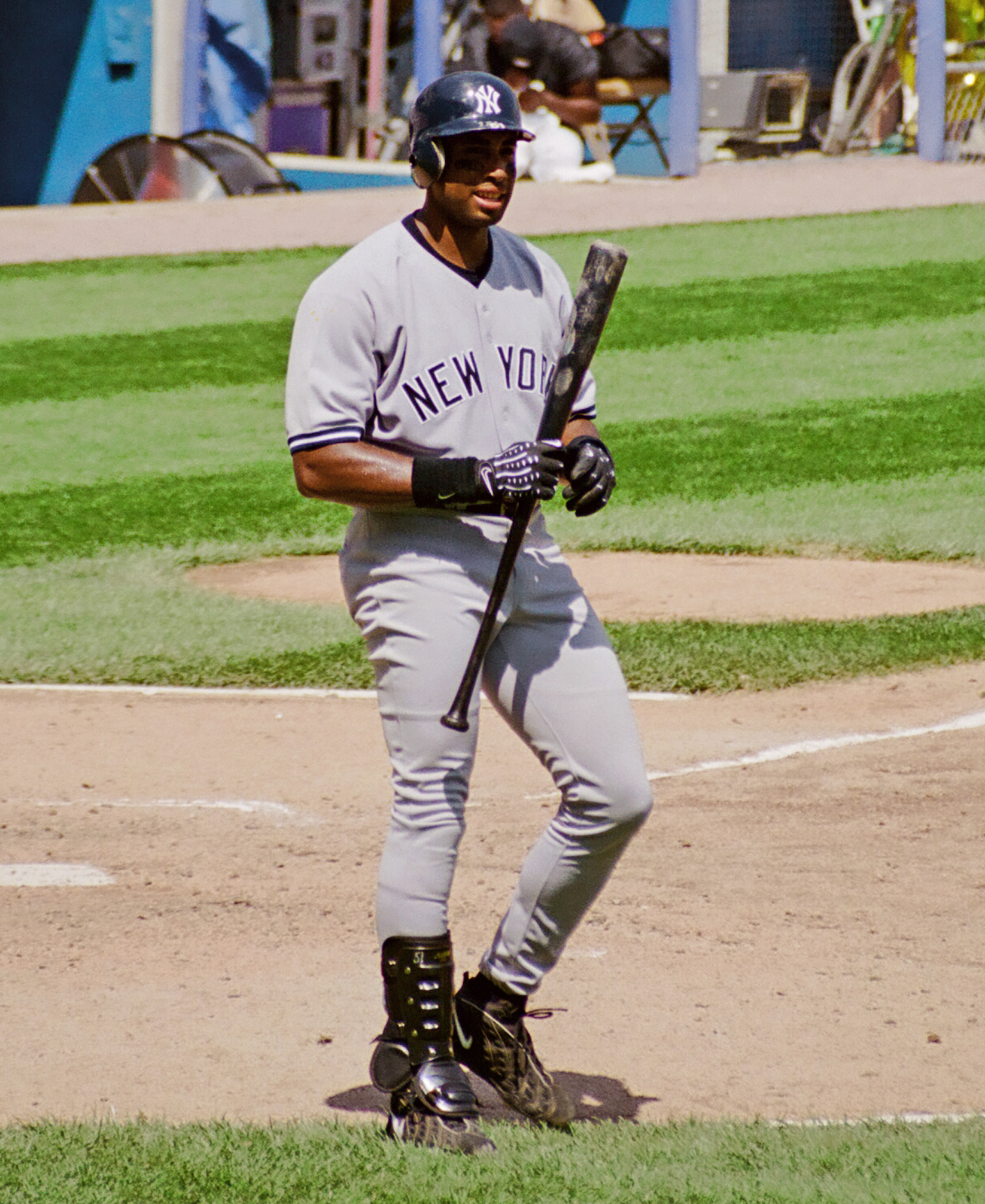
Bernie Williams hit a three-run home run in the ninth inning of Game 3 to extend the Yankees' lead to five.

=== Game 3 ===
October 21, 2003 8:32 pm (EDT) at Pro Player Stadium in Miami Gardens, Florida 78 °F (26 °C), overcast
Team	1	2	3	4	5	6	7	8	9	R	H	E
New York	0	0	0	1	0	0	0	1	4	6	6	1
Florida	1	0	0	0	0	0	0	0	0	1	8	0
WP: Mike Mussina (1–0) LP: Josh Beckett (0–1) Sv: Mariano Rivera (1); Home runs: NYY: Aaron Boone (1), Bernie Williams (2); FLA: None; Boxscore

Game 3 was a pitcher's duel for the first seven innings. Florida starter Josh Beckett held the Yankees to one run through seven innings, the lone run coming on a bases-loaded walk after two consecutive borderline pitches that were called balls. The Marlins struck early off New York starter Mike Mussina with Miguel Cabrera singling in Juan Pierre in the bottom of the first. Mussina settled down and did not allow another run to the Marlins in seven strong innings. Beckett pitched strong into the eighth until he started to tire. He left with one out in the eighth having recorded ten strikeouts for the night.

Reliever Dontrelle Willis entered the 1–1 game and got one out, but gave up an opposite-field single to Hideki Matsui to give the Yankees their first lead of the night. Chad Fox relieved Willis and struck out Rubén Sierra to end the inning. The Yankees offense would return in the ninth. Aaron Boone led off the inning with a home run to left, and after a walk by Alfonso Soriano, Derek Jeter was hit by a pitch before Bernie Williams hit a three-run shot to center to give the Yankees a 6–1 lead. Williams' home run was his 19th in the postseason, a new Major League record. His 65 RBIs were also the most in postseason history. Yankees closer Mariano Rivera pitched the final two innings for his record 30th career postseason save. Mussina received his fifth postseason win. The game was interrupted in the fifth by a 39-minute rain delay, the first weather-related delay of a World Series game since Game 1 of the 1996 World Series at Yankee Stadium.

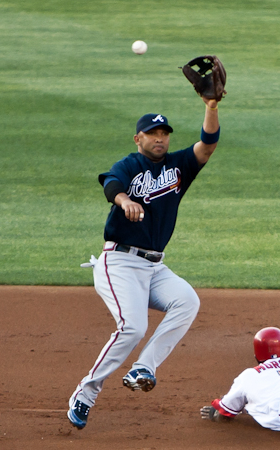
Álex González hit a walk-off solo home run in the twelfth inning of Game 4 to even the series at two games apiece for the Marlins.

=== Game 4 ===
October 22, 2003 8:24 pm (EDT) at Pro Player Stadium in Miami Gardens, Florida 78 °F (26 °C), clear
Team	1	2	3	4	5	6	7	8	9	10	11	12	R	H	E
New York	0	1	0	0	0	0	0	0	2	0	0	0	3	12	0
Florida	3	0	0	0	0	0	0	0	0	0	0	1	4	10	0
WP: Braden Looper (1–0) LP: Jeff Weaver (0–1); Home runs: NYY: None; FLA: Miguel Cabrera (1), Álex González (1); Boxscore

The Marlins jumped out to an early lead against Yankees starter Roger Clemens. Miguel Cabrera hit a two-run homer in the first and Derrek Lee hit an RBI single. Clemens settled down and held the Marlins scoreless in the next six innings. When Clemens struck out Luis Castillo to end the seventh, it was then thought to have marked the end of his Major League career. With flashbulbs lighting up the stadium, the crowd gave him a standing ovation; the Marlins even paused to applaud in recognition of Clemens' what then appeared to be a Hall-of-Fame career (as it turned out, Clemens would put off his retirement to sign with the Houston Astros for 2004). Meanwhile, the Yankees scored their first run on a sacrifice fly by Aaron Boone in the second inning. Marlins starter Carl Pavano held the Yankees to that lone run through eight strong innings.

Clemens was set to get the loss until the Yankees rallied in the ninth inning against Ugueth Urbina. Bernie Williams singled with one out, Hideki Matsui walked and Jorge Posada grounded into a force play with Matsui out at second. Pinch-hitter Rubén Sierra fouled off two full-count pitches before tripling into the right-field corner to score Williams and pinch-runner David Dellucci to tie the ball game. The game headed to extra innings. The Yankees threatened to score in the top of the 11th inning when they loaded the bases with one out off Chad Fox. Braden Looper relieved Fox and struck out Boone, and replacement catcher John Flaherty popped out to third. The Marlins won the game in dramatic fashion in the bottom of the 12th inning when Álex González led off with a home run off Jeff Weaver that just cleared the fence in left to help the Marlins win 4–3. Prior to the home run, Gonzalez had been 5-for-53 in the 2003 postseason.

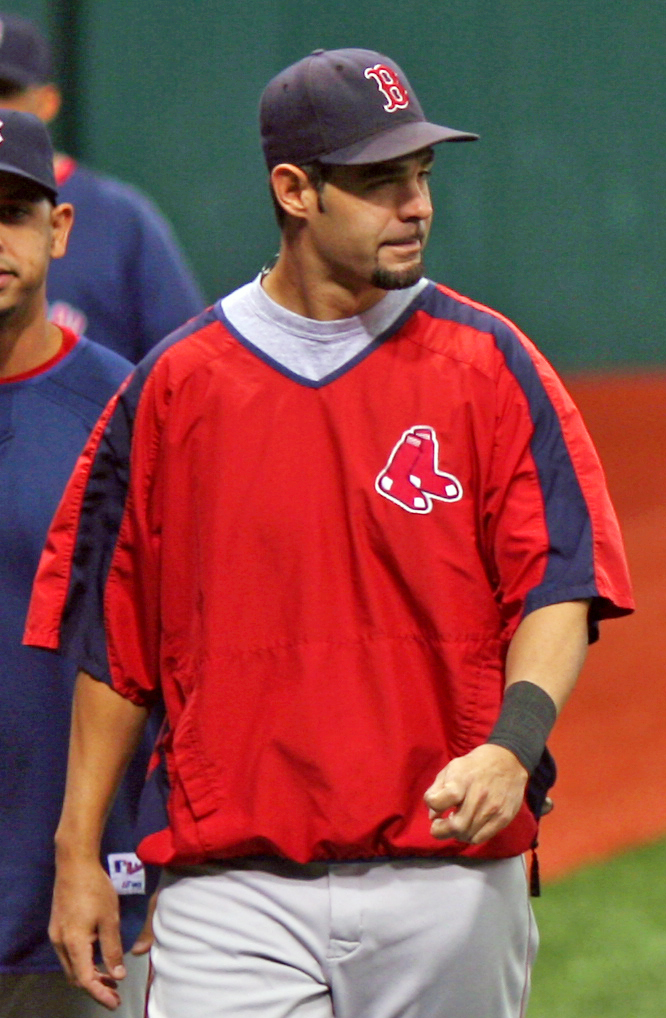
Mike Lowell hit a two-run single in the fifth inning that provided the winning margin for the Marlins in Game 5.

=== Game 5 ===
October 23, 2003 8:24 pm (EDT) at Pro Player Stadium in Miami Gardens, Florida 81 °F (27 °C), cloudy
Team	1	2	3	4	5	6	7	8	9	R	H	E
New York	1	0	0	0	0	0	1	0	2	4	12	1
Florida	0	3	0	1	2	0	0	0	X	6	9	1
WP: Brad Penny (2–0) LP: José Contreras (0–1) Sv: Ugueth Urbina (2); Home runs: NYY: Jason Giambi (1); FLA: None; Boxscore

Game 5 featured a rematch of Game 1's starters, Florida's Brad Penny versus New York's David Wells. Before a sellout crowd of 65,975, the Yankees did not appear very sharp, botching a rundown play in the fifth inning that led to two Marlin runs. Slumping Alfonso Soriano was benched and first baseman Jason Giambi nursed a leg injury. Wells left the game after pitching just one inning due to back spasms. His replacement, José Contreras, pitched three shaky innings, allowing three walks and four runs. The Yankees drew first blood with a sacrifice fly from Bernie Williams in the first. In the second, the Marlins scored on an RBI double by Álex González and Brad Penny helped his own cause by singling in two more runs. They scored again on a Juan Pierre double in the fourth and a two-run single by Mike Lowell in the fifth, to give the Marlins a 6–1 lead.

The Yankees began clawing away at that lead with a Derek Jeter RBI-single in the seventh. Dontrelle Willis relieved Penny by pitching a scoreless eighth. In the ninth, Jason Giambi hit a pinch-hit home run to right field off reliever Braden Looper. That made it 6–3 Marlins. After a Jeter single, Enrique Wilson doubled him home to cut the Marlins' lead to 6–4. Ugueth Urbina relieved Looper and retired Bernie Williams on a fly ball near the outfield wall which was caught by Juan Encarnación just inches away from a home run and Hideki Matsui on a ground ball to first base to preserve the Marlins win.

This would be the seventh and final World Series game at what was then Pro Player Stadium; the Marlins would continue to play at the stadium until the end of the 2011 Major League Baseball season. This was the first of two consecutive games in this World Series to mark the final World Series game in its respective park. This game also marked the first time in MLB history that 1st inning runs had been scored in the first 5 games played in a World Series.

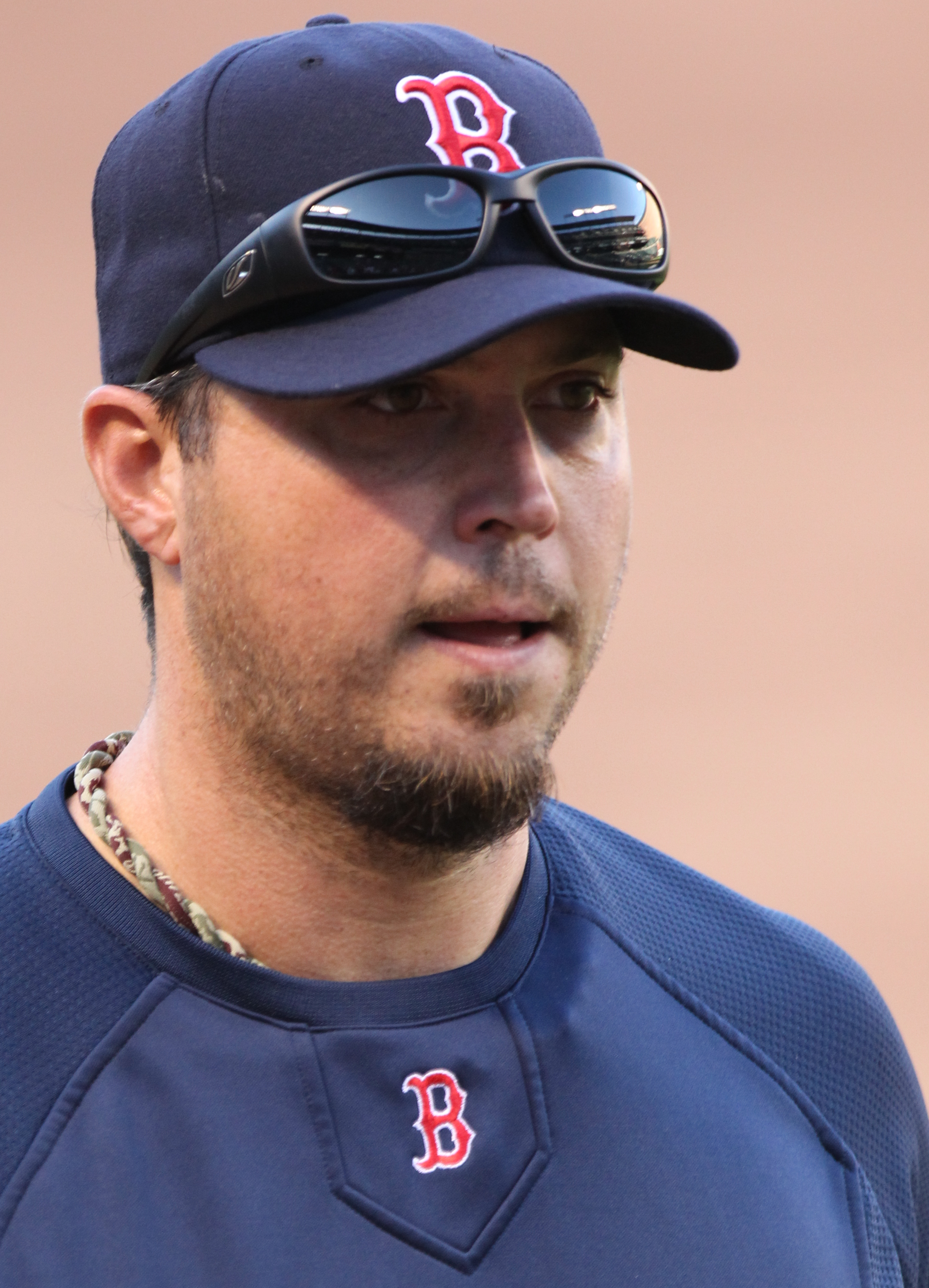
Josh Beckett pitched a complete game shutout in Game 6 to clinch the Marlins' second World Series title.

=== Game 6 ===
October 25, 2003 7:55 pm (EDT) at Yankee Stadium in Bronx, New York 56 °F (13 °C), cloudy
Team	1	2	3	4	5	6	7	8	9	R	H	E
Florida	0	0	0	0	1	1	0	0	0	2	7	0
New York	0	0	0	0	0	0	0	0	0	0	5	1
WP: Josh Beckett (1–1) LP: Andy Pettitte (1–1); Boxscore

The series headed back to New York for Game 6, marking the 100th World Series game played at Yankee Stadium. Marlins manager Jack McKeon decided to start 23-year-old Josh Beckett on three days' rest instead of Mark Redman, who had struggled in his Game 2 start. Beckett made the move seem brilliant—his complete-game shutout in the final game of the World Series made him the first to accomplish the feat since Jack Morris of the Minnesota Twins in 1991. The Marlins scored the game's only runs on three consecutive two-out singles by Álex González, Juan Pierre and Luis Castillo in the fifth and Juan Encarnación's sacrifice fly that scored Jeff Conine, who had reached on an error the next inning.

Andy Pettitte pitched seven strong innings in a losing cause, with only one run being earned. Mariano Rivera pitched the last two innings for New York.

With the victory, the Marlins became the first National League team since the 1981 Los Angeles Dodgers, the last opposing team to win a Series championship at Yankee Stadium, to win the World Series without having home field advantage. They are just the fourth team overall to do it since the 1984 Detroit Tigers, 1992 Toronto Blue Jays and 1999 New York Yankees. They also became the second expansion team in the National League to win two World Series titles, following the New York Mets who achieved this feat in 1986; the Toronto Blue Jays of the American League, who pulled this off in 1992 and 1993, are the third major-league expansion franchise to do so. The Marlins also became the fastest expansion team to win two World Series titles, as the Mets won their second title in their 25th season, and the Blue Jays did it in their 17th (the Royals, joining the group 12 years later, got their second title in their 47th season).

The championship was the Marlins' second despite never having won a division title. The Atlanta Braves had won the NL East every year since 1995 going into this World Series, a strike ended the 1994 season without division winners, and the Philadelphia Phillies won the Marlins' division in 1993 (that streak would end in 2006, when the New York Mets claimed the NL East title). The Marlins also became the first team since the creation of the Division Series to win the World Series without having home-field advantage during their entire post-season. As of 2020, the Marlins have a 6-1 record in postseason series play; until the Tampa Bay Rays lost the 2008 World Series, they had extended their home state's perfect streak to 8-0. The now-Miami Marlins recorded their first postseason series loss against the Atlanta Braves in 2020. This was the last World Series game held in the original Yankee Stadium before its closure after the 2008 season. The last World Series in which two stadiums hosted their final World Series games until this year was the 1959 World Series.

== Composite box ==
2003 World Series (4–2): Florida Marlins (N.L.) over New York Yankees (A.L.)

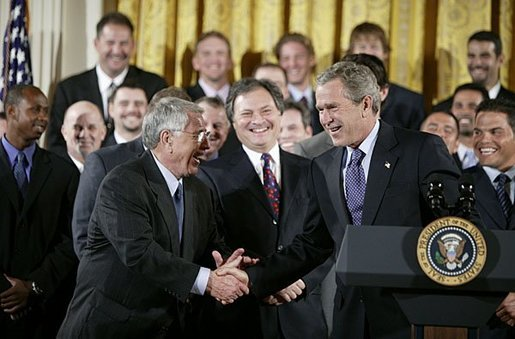
Jack McKeon and George W. Bush

Team	1	2	3	4	5	6	7	8	9	10	11	12	R	H	E
Florida Marlins	5	3	0	1	5	1	0	0	1	0	0	1	17	47	2
New York Yankees	4	2	1	3	0	1	1	1	8	0	0	0	21	54	5
Total attendance: 364,932 Average attendance: 60,822; Winning player's share: $306,150 Losing player's share: $180,890

This World Series is notable for being one of the few six-game series in which the winning team was outscored. It happened previously in 1918, 1959, 1977, 1992, and 1996. Seven-game series winners were outscored in 1957, 1960, 1962, 1964, 1971, 1972, 1973, 1975, 1991, 1997, 2002, and 2025); (equaled in 2016 and 2017).

== Aftermath ==
=== The Marlins second post-World Series fire sale ===
There were slight tweaks to the Marlins over the next two years as they traded away Derrek Lee, Mark Redman and Brad Penny and lost Carl Pavano and Ivan Rodriguez to free agency.

But the team began a full blown fire sale after the 2005 season. They let Burnett, Todd Jones, Antonio Alfonseca, Jeff Conine and Juan Encarnación leave as free agents. They then traded Carlos Delgado and Paul Lo Duca to the New York Mets in two separate deals that brought in prospects Mike Jacobs and Yusmeiro Petit. On the same day as the Delgado deal, they also sent Mike Lowell, Josh Beckett and Guillermo Mota to the Boston Red Sox for future Rookie of the Year Hanley Ramirez, Anibal Sanchez (who threw a no-hitter in 2006), Harvey Garcia and Jesus Delgado. Just days after that deal, second baseman Luis Castillo was sent to the Minnesota Twins for Travis Bowyer and Scott Tyler. For his part, outfielder Juan Pierre was then sent to the Chicago Cubs for Sergio Mitre, Ricky Nolasco and Renyel Pinto.

Despite these deals, or potentially because of them, the Marlins actually contended for most of the 2006 season before a late slump dropped them below .500. They are the only team in MLB history to have been 20 games under .500 and have a winning record at different points in the same season. This was in stark contrast to their terrible performance in 1998, in which they lost 108 games one year after their original post-World Series fire sale that followed their first championship.

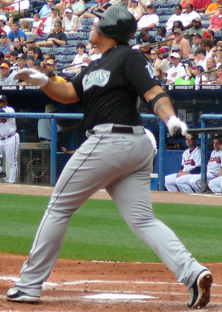
Despite just 5 seasons with the Marlins, “Miggy” Cabrera is considered one of the best players in franchise history.

The fire-sale continued into the 2007-2008 off-season, when the Marlins sent Miguel Cabrera to Detroit along with Dontrelle Willis for Burke Badenhop, Frankie De La Cruz, Cameron Maybin, Andrew Miller and Mike Rabelo (plus a minor leaguer). Cabrera went on to Detroit, going to eight more All-Star games, winning back-to-back MVP awards and a triple crown in 2013. Meanwhile, for the Marlins, Maybin never developed into the star he was projected to be, Andrew Miller failed as a starter and became a star reliever after leaving the club, De La Cruz pitched a total of 18 innings in a Marlins uniform, Rabelo hit .202 in 34 games in Miami, while Badenhop had a decent career for the Marlins as a middle reliever.

Over the years, the Marlins gained a reputation for fire-selling. Following the sale of the now-Miami Marlins by Jeffrey Loria to Bruce Sherman and the installation of Hall of Fame former player Derek Jeter as team president, after the 2017 season, there was some hope that the Miami franchise would become a more competitive organization. However, the new management team announced they would instead reduce the team's investment into player salaries as the team was in a negative financial situation. During the 2017-2018 off-season, the team traded its star outfield consisting of All-Stars Marcel Ozuna, Christian Yelich, and Giancarlo Stanton.

Despite two World championships in a seven year span and a state of the art ballpark built in 2012, the Marlins still have not been able to build a sizable fanbase, in large part due to their two post-World Series fire-sales.

The Marlins would not return to the playoffs until the shortened regular season in 2020. That season saw the Marlins lose their first playoff series in franchise history, losing the 2020 NLDS to the Atlanta Braves after winning their first seven postseason series.

=== Exit Boone, Enter Rodriguez ===
In January 2004, Aaron Boone tore the anterior cruciate ligament in his left knee during a pick-up basketball game in his hometown in Newport Beach, California. In the game, Boone caught a pass from his teammate on the court and an opponent wiped him out on his side in a violent manner. Boone, who disobeyed the terms of his contract with the Yankees by playing basketball, was released fourteen days after the incident and ended up missing the entirety of the 2004 season.

With spring training a month away, the Yankees found themselves in the market for a third baseman. On February 15, 2004, the Rangers traded Alex Rodriguez to the New York Yankees for second baseman Alfonso Soriano and a player to be named later (Joaquín Árias was sent to the Rangers on March 24). The Rangers also agreed to pay $67 million of the $179 million left on Rodriguez's contract. Rodriguez agreed to switch positions from shortstop to third base, paving the way for the trade, because the popular Derek Jeter was already entrenched at shortstop. This was only the second time in MLB history that a reigning MVP was traded, with the first coming in 1914 when Eddie Collins was traded to the Chicago White Sox from the Philadelphia Athletics for cash considerations.

Rodriguez ended up having a successful, yet controversial career with New York. He put up huge numbers throughout his tenure in pinstripes, which included two MVP seasons in 2005 and 2007. Despite this, he was often the most criticized on the team when the Yankees flamed out in post-season, such as blowing a 3-0 lead to the Red Sox in the 2004 American League Championship Series. Rodriguez was also popped for steroids twice in pinstripes. Nevertheless, Rodriguez and the Yankees would win a World Series in 2009. In that postseason, he batted .365, hit six homeruns, and drove in 18 runs. Rodriguez also hit home run number 600 with the Yankees, becoming only the eighth player in baseball history to reach 600 home runs.

Aaron Boone would become the Yankees manager in 2018, replacing Joe Girardi. Boone’s job prior to becoming manager was a color analyst for ESPN’s Sunday Night Baseball, in which he was ironically replaced again by Alex Rodriguez.

=== Torre's last hurrah ===
For the Yankees, it would prove to be their final appearance in the World Series with Joe Torre as their manager. They would not get back to the World Series until 2009 when they beat the defending Champion Philadelphia Phillies in six games, this time with second-year manager Joe Girardi; Torre had stepped down after the 2007 season. After parting ways with the Yankees, Torre managed the Los Angeles Dodgers from 2008-2010. For his success with the Yankees, Torre was inducted into the National Baseball Hall of Fame in 2014. Since retiring in 2010, he has worked various jobs in the commissioner’s office, serving as a special assistant to the Commissioner since 2020.

=== Other notes ===
Josh Beckett and Mike Lowell later won a second World Series together with the 2007 Boston Red Sox, with Beckett winning ALCS MVP and Lowell earning World Series MVP that year. Braden Looper and Juan Encarnación also won a second World Series title as members of the 2006 St. Louis Cardinals. On the Yankees' side, Jeff Weaver played alongside Looper and Encarnación on the Cardinals' 2006 title team, and José Contreras won a World Series ring with the 2005 Chicago White Sox.

== See also ==
- 2003 Japan Series
