= 1999 Florida Marlins season =

1999 Florida Marlins
- League: National League
- Division: East
- Ballpark: Pro Player Stadium
- City: Miami Gardens, Florida
- Record: 64–98 (.395)
- Divisional place: 5th
- Owners: John W. Henry
- General managers: Dave Dombrowski
- Managers: John Boles
- Television: Sports Channel Florida; WAMI-TV (Joe Angel, Dave O'Brien, Tommy Hutton)
- Radio: WQAM (Joe Angel, Dave O'Brien, Jon Sciambi); WQBA (Spanish) (Felo Ramírez, Jesús Díaz)

The 1999 Florida Marlins season was the seventh season for the Major League Baseball (MLB) franchise in the National League. It would begin with the team attempting to improve on their season from 1998. Their manager was John Boles. They played home games at Pro Player Stadium. They finished with a record of 64–98, fifth in the National League East.

== Offseason ==
- October 28, 1998: Bruce Aven was selected off waivers by the Florida Marlins from the Cleveland Indians.
- December 14, 1998: Édgar Rentería was traded by the Florida Marlins to the St. Louis Cardinals for Armando Almanza, Braden Looper, and Pablo Ozuna.
- December 23, 1998: Gregg Zaun was sent to the Texas Rangers by the Florida Marlins as part of a conditional deal.

== Regular season ==
=== Opening Day starters ===
1	Luis Castillo	2B
8	Alex Gonzalez	SS
7	Mark Kotsay	RF
25	Derrek Lee	1B
17	Todd Dunwoody	CF
44	Preston Wilson	LF
27	Kevin Orie	3B
52	Mike Redmond	C
32	Alex Fernandez	P

=== Season standings ===
NL East
Team	W	L	Pct.	GB	Home	Road
Atlanta Braves	103	59	.636	—	56‍–‍25	47‍–‍34
New York Mets	97	66	.595	6½	49‍–‍32	48‍–‍34
Philadelphia Phillies	77	85	.475	26	41‍–‍40	36‍–‍45
Montreal Expos	68	94	.420	35	35‍–‍46	33‍–‍48
Florida Marlins	64	98	.395	39	35‍–‍45	29‍–‍53

=== Record vs. opponents ===
1999 National League record Source: MLB Standings Grid – 1999
Team	AZ	ATL	CHC	CIN	COL	FLA	HOU	LAD	MIL	MON	NYM	PHI	PIT	SD	SF	STL	AL
Arizona	—	4–5	7–2	1–8	6–7	8–1	5–4	7–6	5–4	6–3	7–2	8–1	5–2	11–2	9–3	4–4	7–8
Atlanta	5–4	—	2–5	8–1	5–4	9–4	6–1	5–4	5–2	9–4	9–3	8–5	6–3	5–4	4–5	8–1	9–9
Chicago	2–7	5–2	—	5–8	4–5	6–3	3–9	2–7	6–6	2–5	3–6	2–7	7–6	6–3	1–7	7–5	6–9
Cincinnati	8–1	1–8	8–5	—	7–2	6–1	9–4	4–3	6–6	4–3	5–5	6–3	7–6	6–3	4–5	8–4	7–8
Colorado	7–6	4–5	5–4	2–7	—	5–4	2–6	8–5	6–3	6–3	4–5	5–4	2–7	4–9	4–9	4–5	4–8
Florida	1–8	4–9	3–6	1–6	4–5	—	2–7	7–2	5–4	8–4	3–10	2–11	3–4	3–6	4–5	3–4	11–7
Houston	4–5	1–6	9–3	4–9	6–2	7–2	—	6–3	8–5	7–2	4–5	6–1	5–7	8–1	5–4	5–7	12–3
Los Angeles	6–7	4–5	7–2	3–4	5–8	2–7	3–6	—	7–2	5–4	4–4	6–3	3–6	3–9	8–5	3–6	8–7
Milwaukee	4–5	2–5	6–6	6–6	3–6	4–5	5–8	2–7	—	5–4	2–5	5–4	8–4	3–5	4–5	7–6	8–6
Montreal	3–6	4–9	5–2	3–4	3–6	4–8	2–7	4–5	4–5	—	5–8	6–6	3–6	5–3	4–5	5–4	8–10
New York	2–7	3–9	6–3	5–5	5–4	10–3	5–4	4–4	5–2	8–5	—	6–6	7–2	7–2	7–2	5–2	12–6
Philadelphia	1–8	5–8	7–2	3–6	4–5	11–2	1–6	3–6	4–5	6–6	6–6	—	3–4	6–3	2–6	4–5	11–7
Pittsburgh	2–5	3–6	6–7	6–7	7–2	4–3	7–5	6–3	4–8	6–3	2–7	4–3	—	3–6	4–5	7–5	7–8
San Diego	2–11	4–5	3–6	3–6	9–4	6–3	1–8	9–3	5–3	3–5	2–7	3–6	6–3	—	5–7	2–7	11–4
San Francisco	3–9	5–4	7–1	5–4	9–4	5–4	4–5	5–8	5–4	5–4	2–7	6–2	5–4	7–5	—	6–3	7–8
St. Louis	4–4	1–8	5–7	4–8	5–4	4–3	7–5	6–3	6–7	4–5	2–5	5–4	5–7	7–2	3–6	—	7–8

=== Transactions ===
- June 15, 1999: Craig Counsell was traded by the Florida Marlins to the Los Angeles Dodgers for a player to be named later. The Los Angeles Dodgers sent Ryan Moskau (minors) (July 15, 1999) to the Florida Marlins to complete the trade.

=== Citrus Series ===
The season series each year between the Devil Rays and the Florida Marlins has come to be known as the Citrus Series. In 1999, the Marlins won the series 5 games to 1.

- June 4 - Marlins @ Devil Rays: 10 – 0
- June 5 - Marlins @ Devil Rays: 9 – 7
- June 6 - Marlins @ Devil Rays: 11 – 6
- July 9 - Marlins vs Devil Rays: 11 – 4
- July 10 - Marlins vs Devil Rays: 8 – 9
- July 11 - Marlins vs Devil Rays: 3 – 2

=== Roster ===
1999 Florida Marlins
Roster
Pitchers: 57 Antonio Alfonseca; 55 Armando Almanza; 59 Héctor Almonte; 48 Brent Billingsley; 43 A. J. Burnett; 43,50 Archie Corbin; 38 Reid Cornelius; 40 Vic Darensbourg; 50 Ryan Dempster; 20 Brian Edmondson; 32 Alex Fernandez; 61 Liván Hernández; 41 Braden Looper; 33 Matt Mantei; 34 Brian Meadows; 47 Rafael Medina; 39,36 Vladimir Núñez; 24 Kirt Ojala; 21 Jesús Sánchez; 49 Dennis Springer; 58 Michael Tejera	Catchers: 6 Ramón Castro; 14 Jorge Fábregas; 9 Guillermo Garcia; 52 Mike Redmond; 19 John Roskos; Infielders: 10 Dave Berg; 1 Luis Castillo; 30 Chris Clapinski; 30 Craig Counsell; 45 Amaury García; 11 Álex González; 25 Derrek Lee; 28 Mike Lowell; 18 Kevin Millar; 27 Kevin Orie	Outfielders: 29,46 Bruce Aven; 23 Danny Bautista; 17 Todd Dunwoody; 15 Cliff Floyd; 26 Tim Hyers; 7 Mark Kotsay; 37 Julio Ramírez; 44 Preston Wilson	Manager: 13 John Boles; Coaches: 12 Joe Breeden (bench); 31 Rich Dubee (pitching); 37,33 Fredi González (third base); 22 Rusty Kuntz (first base); 16 Jack Maloof (hitting); 8 Tony Taylor (bullpen)

== Player stats ==
=== Batting ===
==== Starters by position ====
Note: Pos = Position; G = Games played; AB = At bats; H = Hits; Avg. = Batting average; HR = Home runs; RBI = Runs batted in

Pos	Player	G	AB	H	Avg.	HR	RBI
C	Mike Redmond	84	242	73	.302	1	27
1B	Kevin Millar	105	351	100	.285	9	67
2B	Luis Castillo	128	487	147	.302	0	28
SS	Álex González	136	560	155	.277	14	59
3B	Mike Lowell	97	308	78	.253	12	47
LF	Bruce Aven	137	381	110	.289	12	70
CF	Preston Wilson	149	482	135	.280	26	71
RF	Mark Kotsay	148	495	134	.271	8	50

==== Other batters ====
Note: G = Games played; AB = At bats; H = Hits; Avg. = Batting average; HR = Home runs; RBI = Runs batted in

Player	G	AB	H	Avg.	HR	RBI
Dave Berg	109	304	87	.286	3	25
Cliff Floyd	69	251	76	.303	11	49
Kevin Orie	77	240	61	.254	6	29
Jorge Fábregas	82	223	46	.206	3	21
Derrek Lee	70	218	45	.206	5	20
Danny Bautista	70	205	59	.288	5	24
Todd Dunwoody	64	186	41	.220	2	20
Tim Hyers	58	81	18	.222	2	12
Ramón Castro	24	67	12	.179	2	4
Craig Counsell	37	66	10	.152	0	2
Chris Clapinski	36	56	13	.232	0	2
Amaury García	10	24	6	.250	2	2
Julio Ramírez	15	21	3	.143	0	2
John Roskos	13	12	2	.167	0	1
Guillermo Garcia	4	4	1	.250	0	0

=== Pitching ===
==== Starting pitchers ====
Note: G = Games pitched; IP = Innings pitched; W = Wins; L = Losses; ERA = Earned run average; SO = Strikeouts

Player	G	IP	W	L	ERA	SO
Dennis Springer	38	196.1	6	16	4.86	83
Brian Meadows	31	178.1	11	15	5.60	72
Ryan Dempster	25	147.0	7	8	4.71	126
Alex Fernandez	24	141.0	7	8	3.38	91
Liván Hernández	20	136.0	5	9	4.76	97
A.J. Burnett	7	41.1	4	2	3.48	33

==== Other pitchers ====
Note: G = Games pitched; IP = Innings pitched; W = Wins; L = Losses; ERA = Earned run average; SO = Strikeouts

Player	G	IP	W	L	ERA	SO
Jesús Sánchez	59	76.1	5	7	6.01	62
Vladimir Núñez	17	74.2	4	8	4.58	58
Reid Cornelius	5	19.1	1	0	3.26	12
Kirt Ojala	8	10.2	0	1	14.34	5
Michael Tejera	3	6.1	0	0	11.37	7

==== Relief pitchers ====
Note: G = Games pitched; W = Wins; L = Losses; SV = Saves; ERA = Earned run average; SO = Strikeouts

Player	G	W	L	SV	ERA	SO
Antonio Alfonseca	73	4	5	21	3.24	46
Braden Looper	72	3	3	0	3.80	50
Brian Edmondson	68	5	8	1	5.84	58
Vic Darensbourg	56	0	1	0	8.83	16
Matt Mantei	35	1	2	10	2.72	50
Rafael Medina	20	1	1	0	5.79	16
Archie Corbin	17	0	1	0	7.29	30
Héctor Almonte	15	0	2	0	4.20	8
Armando Almanza	14	0	1	0	1.72	20
Brent Billingsley	8	0	0	0	16.43	3

== Farm system ==
Level	Team	League	Manager
AAA	Calgary Cannons	Pacific Coast League	Lynn Jones
AA	Portland Sea Dogs	Eastern League	Frank Cacciatore
A	Brevard County Manatees	Florida State League	Dave Huppert
A	Kane County Cougars	Midwest League	Rick Renteria
A-Short Season	Utica Blue Sox	New York–Penn League	Ken Joyce
Rookie	GCL Marlins	Gulf Coast League	Jon Deeble
