= Amaury García =

Amaury García may refer to:

- Amaury García (baseball) (born 1975), Dominican baseball player
- Amaury García (footballer) (born 2001), Mexican footballer
