= Julio Ramírez (baseball) =

Dominican baseball player (born 1977)

- Outfielder
- Born: August 10, 1977 (age 48); San Juan de la Maguana, Dominican Republic
- Batted: Right Threw: Right

MLB debut
- September 10, 1999, for the Florida Marlins

Last MLB appearance
- October 2, 2005, for the San Francisco Giants

MLB statistics
- Batting average: .167
- Home runs: 1
- Runs batted in: 11
- Stats at Baseball Reference

Teams
- Florida Marlins (1999); Chicago White Sox (2001); Anaheim Angels (2002–2003); San Francisco Giants (2005)

Julio Cesar Ramírez (born 10 August 1977) is a Dominican former Major League Baseball center fielder. He played five seasons, starting in 1999 with the Florida Marlins, then moving on to the Chicago White Sox, Anaheim Angels and San Francisco Giants. Julio is currently the OF coach for the White Sox Dominican league team
