= Amaury García (baseball) =

Dominican baseball player (born 1975)

- Second baseman
- Born: May 20, 1975 (age 50); Santo Domingo, Dominican Republic
- Batted: Right Threw: Right

MLB debut
- July 5, 1999, for the Florida Marlins

Last MLB appearance
- October 3, 1999, for the Florida Marlins

MLB statistics
- Batting average: .250
- Home runs: 2
- Runs batted in: 2

KBO statistics
- Batting average: .260
- Home runs: 2
- Runs batted in: 8

CPBL statistics
- Batting average: .339
- Home runs: 1
- Runs batted in: 23
- Stats at Baseball Reference

Teams
- Florida Marlins (1999); Hanwha Eagles (2002); Macoto Cobras (2006)

Amaury Miguel García (born May 20, 1975) is a Dominican former Major League Baseball second baseman and current hitting coach for the Hagerstown Suns. He played for the Florida Marlins for ten games during the 1999 Florida Marlins season.
