= Xavier Edwards =

American baseball player (born 1999)

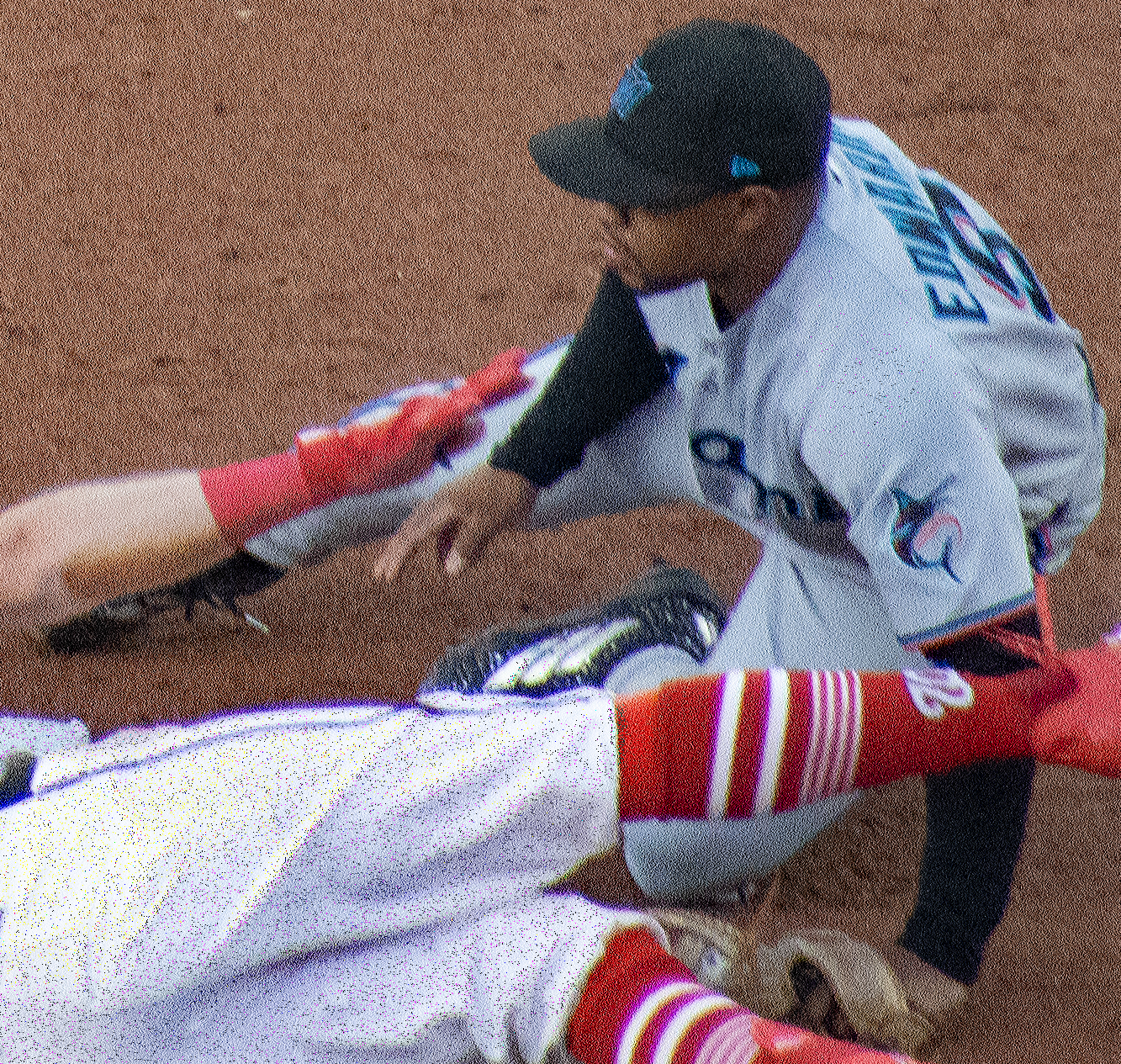
- Edwards with the Miami Marlins in 2026

Miami Marlins – No. 9
- Second baseman / Shortstop
- Born: August 9, 1999 (age 27); Mineola, New York, U.S.
- Bats: Switch Throws: Right

MLB debut
- May 2, 2023, for the Miami Marlins

MLB statistics (through 2026 season)
- Batting average: .291
- Home runs: 10
- Runs batted in: 124
- Stats at Baseball Reference

Teams
- Miami Marlins (2023–present)

Xavier James Edwards (born August 9, 1999) is an American professional baseball infielder for the Miami Marlins of Major League Baseball (MLB). He made his MLB debut in 2023.

== Early life and amateur career ==
Edwards was born at Mineola Hospital in Mineola, New York. His father, Jovon, played in Minor League Baseball. The Edwards family lived in different places in Long Island until he was five years old, when they moved to South Florida, where his older sister could compete in junior tennis all year. Xavier grew up playing baseball and tennis, before beginning to focus more on baseball by the time he was eight years old.

Edwards graduated from North Broward Preparatory School in Coconut Creek, Florida. As a senior, he batted .406 with 16 runs batted in (RBIs), 24 stolen bases, and a .532 on-base percentage. He committed to play college baseball at Vanderbilt University.

== Professional career ==
=== San Diego Padres ===
The San Diego Padres selected Edwards with the 38th overall pick in the 2018 Major League Baseball (MLB) draft, and he signed for $2.6 million. He made his professional debut with the AZL Padres and was promoted to the Tri-City Dust Devils on August 8. In 45 total games with the two teams, Edwards slashed .346/.453/.409, with 16 RBIs and 22 stolen bases.

In 2019, he began with the Fort Wayne TinCaps, earning Midwest League All-Star honors. After slashing .336/.392/.414, with one home run, 30 RBIs, and 20 stolen bases in 77 games, he was promoted to the Lake Elsinore Storm on July 9. In 46 games with Lake Elsinore, he hit .301/.349/.367 with 14 stolen bases.

After the season, Edwards was selected for the United States national baseball team in the 2019 WBSC Premier12. In the tournament, he appeared in four games, hitting two singles and striking out three times in six at bats.

=== Tampa Bay Rays ===
On December 6, 2019, the Padres traded Edwards, Hunter Renfroe, and a player to be named later (PTBNL) to the Tampa Bay Rays in exchange for Tommy Pham and Jake Cronenworth. The PTBNL, Esteban Quiroz, was named in March 2020. Rays pitcher Blake Snell referred to Edwards as a "slapdick prospect" upon learning about the trade, later apologizing and explaining that his reaction was about losing his friend Pham to the Padres.

Edwards did not play in 2020, due to the cancellation of the Minor League Baseball season because of the COVID-19 pandemic. In 2021, he played for the Montgomery Biscuits, slashing .302/.377/.368, with 27 RBI and 19 stolen bases over 79 games.

=== Miami Marlins ===
On November 15, 2022, the Rays traded Edwards and J. T. Chargois to the Miami Marlins for Marcus Johnson and Santiago Suarez. The Marlins subsequently added him to their 40-man roster to protect him from the Rule 5 draft. Edwards was optioned to the Triple-A Jacksonville Jumbo Shrimp to begin the 2023 season. He played in 20 games for Jacksonville, batting .306/.427/.361 with no home runs, four RBIs, and seven stolen bases.

On May 2, 2023, the Marlins promoted Edwards to the major leagues. They optioned him to Jacksonville on May 30 and promoted him back to the Marlins on September 1. In 30 games for Miami in total, Edwards batted .295/.329/.333 with no home runs, three RBIs, and five stolen bases. He hit a single in his only postseason at bat, scoring the Marlins' lone run in a series-ending loss to the Philadelphia Phillies on October 4, 2023.

Edwards began the 2024 season on the 10-day injured list with a bacterial infection in his left foot. He was transferred to the 60-day injured list on May 7. On May 27, Edwards was activated and optioned to Triple-A Jacksonville. He was recalled to Miami on June 7 and played in three games before being optioned back to Jacksonville on June 10. He was recalled to Miami on July 2.

On July 28, 2024, Edwards hit his first career triple and home run in addition to hitting for the cycle in a 6–2 loss against the Milwaukee Brewers, becoming the second player in franchise history to hit for the cycle, after Luis Arráez on April 11, 2023, against the Phillies. On September 27, Edwards hit three triples in a 15–5 victory over the Toronto Blue Jays, becoming the first player to achieve the feat since Yasiel Puig in 2014.

In May 2025, the Marlins announced that they were shifting Edwards to second base and Otto Lopez to shortstop.

== Personal life ==
In 2018, Edwards began hosting the Xavier Edwards Baseball Camp on the campus of North Broward Prep. The annual event helps 170 children train in baseball. He has also paired it with a showcase for college baseball recruiting.

== See also ==
- List of Major League Baseball players to hit for the cycle

Achievements
Preceded by Yordan Alvarez	Hitting for the cycle July 28, 2024	Succeeded by Weston Wilson
