= Brent Billingsley =

American baseball player (1975–2024)

- Pitcher
- Born: April 19, 1975; Downey, California, U.S.
- Died: December 25, 2024 (aged 49); Corona, California, U.S.
- Batted: Left Threw: Left

MLB debut
- May 20, 1999, for the Florida Marlins

Last MLB appearance
- October 3, 1999, for the Florida Marlins

MLB statistics
- Win–loss record: 0–0
- Earned run average: 16.43
- Strikeouts: 3
- Stats at Baseball Reference

Teams
- Florida Marlins (1999)

Brent Aaron Billingsley (April 19, 1975 – December 25, 2024) was an American Major League Baseball relief pitcher. Billingsley played for the Florida Marlins in the 1999 season, appearing in eight games for a total of 7.2 innings pitched. He batted and threw left-handed.

Billingsley was drafted by the Marlins in the 5th round of the 1996 MLB amateur draft out of Cal State Fullerton, having transferred there from East Carolina University.

Billingsley died on December 25, 2024, aged 49.
