= Alex Fernandez (baseball) =

American baseball player (born 1969)

- Pitcher
- Born: August 13, 1969 (age 57); Miami Beach, Florida, U.S.
- Batted: Right Threw: Right

MLB debut
- August 2, 1990, for the Chicago White Sox

Last MLB appearance
- May 18, 2000, for the Florida Marlins

MLB statistics
- Win–loss record: 107–87
- Earned run average: 3.74
- Strikeouts: 1,252
- Stats at Baseball Reference

Teams
- Chicago White Sox (1990–1996); Florida Marlins (1997, 1999–2000)

Career highlights and awards
- World Series champion (1997); Golden Spikes Award (1990); Dick Howser Trophy (1990)

Alexander Fernandez (born August 13, 1969) is an American former professional baseball pitcher. He pitched for the Chicago White Sox (1990–96) and Florida Marlins (1997, 1999–2000) in his 11-year Major League Baseball career. He was a member of the Florida Marlins when they won their first-ever World Series championship. After pitching the entire regular season for the Marlins, Fernandez was on the 1997 postseason roster for the NLDS and NLCS. However, due to a shoulder injury, he was unavailable during the World Series. Fernandez retired in 2001, citing shoulder problems that were incurred in the 1997 postseason.

On April 10 of that 1997 season, against the Chicago Cubs at Wrigley Field, Fernandez had a no-hitter broken up with one out in the ninth on a Dave Hansen single (the ball going under Fernandez' glove and under his right leg), the only hit Fernandez would allow in defeating the Cubs 1-0. The no-hitter would have been the first pitched against the Cubs since Sandy Koufax's perfect game in 1965.

Fernandez was born in Miami Beach, Florida in 1969. He attended Monsignor Edward Pace High School in Miami Gardens, FL. In 1990, Fernandez won the Dick Howser Trophy for National College Baseball player of the year while pitching at Miami-Dade Community College (MDCC). He previously played at the University of Miami before transferring to MDCC to be eligible to enter the Baseball Major League Draft.

Going on a different path after retiring from baseball, Fernandez is involved in radio and becoming active in politics in his hometown of Miami Beach, where he campaigned for and helped elect its mayor. He is the former director of baseball operations at Archbishop McCarthy High School in Southwest Ranches, Florida.

Fernandez was inducted into the Hispanic Heritage Baseball Museum Hall of Fame on September 13, 2008. The induction took place during a pregame ceremony before a Florida Marlins vs Washington Nationals game at Dolphin Stadium in Miami, Florida.
