= Todd Dunwoody =

American baseball player (born 1975)

- Center fielder
- Born: April 11, 1975 (age 51); Lafayette, Indiana, U.S.
- Batted: Left Threw: Left

MLB debut
- May 10, 1997, for the Florida Marlins

Last MLB appearance
- June 21, 2002, for the Cleveland Indians

MLB statistics
- Batting average: .233
- Home runs: 11
- Runs batted in: 81
- Stats at Baseball Reference

Teams
- Florida Marlins (1997–1999); Kansas City Royals (2000); Chicago Cubs (2001); Cleveland Indians (2002)

Todd Franklin Dunwoody (born April 11, 1975) is an American former Major League Baseball player.

Dunwoody was chosen in the seventh round of the 1993 amateur draft by the Florida Marlins. Throughout his 13-year professional career, he played for the Florida Marlins, Kansas City Royals, Chicago Cubs, and Cleveland Indians. In 1995, Dunwoody was named a Midwest League All-Star, and was named one of baseball's top 100 prospects by Baseball America in 1997 and 1998. However, he could not master the strike zone and hit just .233 in the majors.

In 2006, Dunwoody served as hitting coach for the South Bend Silver Hawks in the Arizona Diamondbacks organization. In following years, he worked as a sales manager at the Bob Rohrman Ford dealership in Lafayette, Indiana.
