= Mike Redmond =

American baseball player and coach (born 1971)

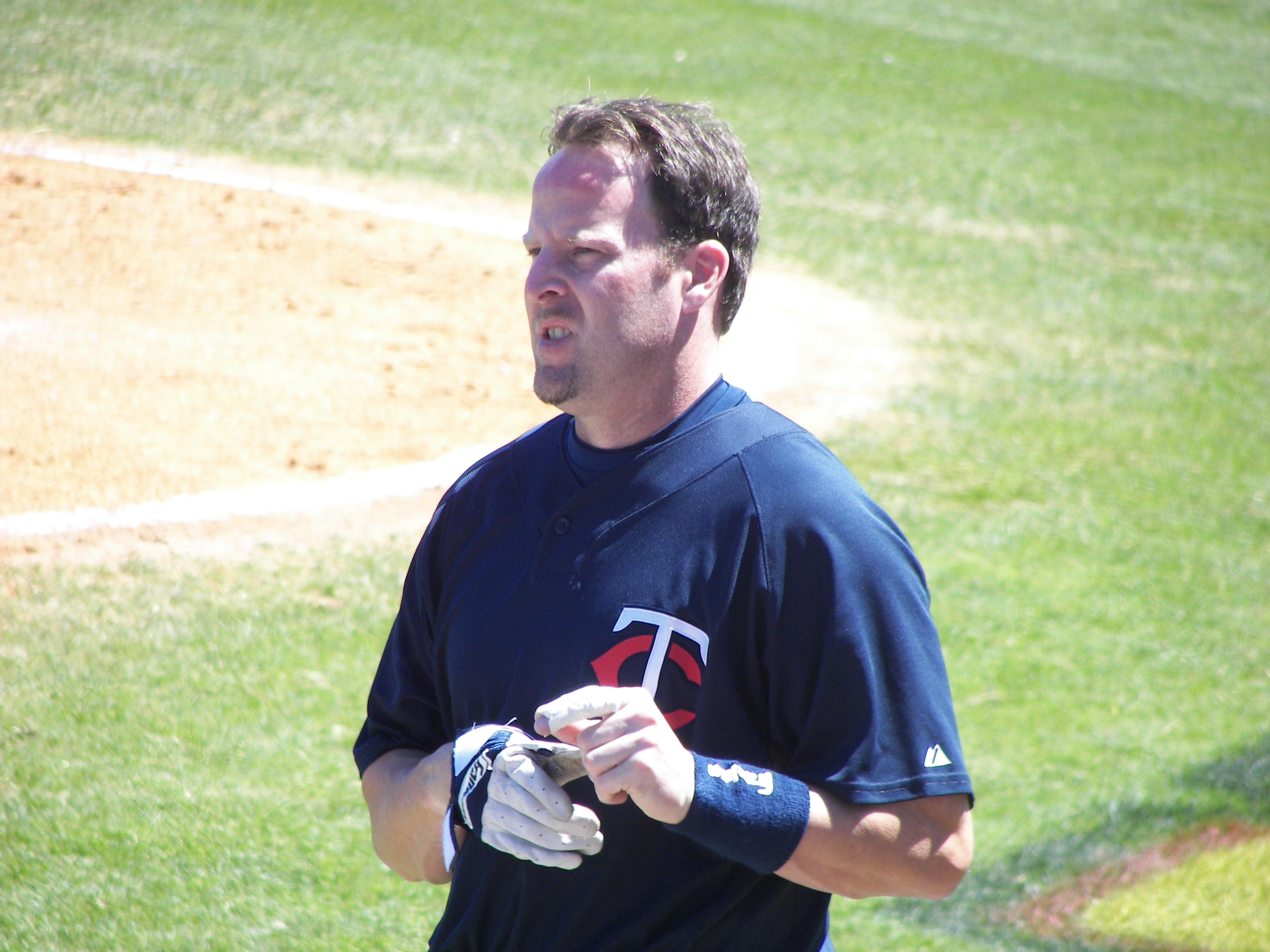
- Redmond with the Minnesota Twins in 2007
- Catcher / Manager / Coach
- Born: May 5, 1971 (age 55); Seattle, Washington, U.S.
- Batted: Right Threw: Right

MLB debut
- May 31, 1998, for the Florida Marlins

Last MLB appearance
- July 2, 2010, for the Cleveland Indians

MLB statistics
- Batting average: .287
- Home runs: 13
- Runs batted in: 243
- Managerial record: 155–207
- Winning %: .428
- Stats at Baseball Reference

Teams
- As player: Florida Marlins (1998–2004); Minnesota Twins (2005–2009); Cleveland Indians (2010); As manager: Miami Marlins (2013–2015); As coach: Colorado Rockies (2017–2025)

Career highlights and awards
- World Series champion (2003)

Michael Patrick Redmond (born May 5, 1971) is an American former professional baseball catcher, coach, and manager, who was most recently the bench coach for the Colorado Rockies of Major League Baseball (MLB). He played for 13 seasons in Major League Baseball with the Florida Marlins, Minnesota Twins, and the Cleveland Indians. In 864 career games, Redmond recorded a batting average of .287 and accumulated 13 home runs, and 243 runs batted in (RBI).

Redmond batted and threw right-handed. He made his major league debut on May 31, 1998, and played his final game on July 2, 2010. He was also part of the Florida Marlins team that won the 2003 World Series. Redmond was named the manager of the Marlins on November 1, 2012. After two and a half years, he was fired on May 17, 2015. In 2017, he was then hired by the Colorado Rockies as a coach.

== Early life ==
Redmond was born on May 5, 1971, in Seattle, five minutes after his fraternal twin brother, Patrick Michael. His father, Pat Sr., was a grocery store buyer.

Redmond grew up in Kirkland, Washington, where he played Little League baseball. His family moved to Spokane, Washington, where Mike and his brother attended Gonzaga Preparatory School, graduating in 1989. Mike, a catcher, and Patrick, a shortstop, both played baseball for the Gonzaga Prep baseball team. In his senior season at Gonzaga Prep, Mike had a .300 batting average with three home runs and 21 runs batted in. He set a single-game record for putouts by a catcher with 15, the single-season record for assists with 114.

Both Redmond brothers committed to attend Gonzaga University, where they played college baseball for the Gonzaga Bulldogs baseball team, when it competed in the Pacific-10 Conference (Pac-10), from 1990 through 1993. Redmond was named a first team Pac-10 all-conference selection in 1991 and 1992. Redmond was invited to Homestead, Florida, where he participated in the United States national baseball team trials for the 1992 Summer Olympics.

== Professional career ==
=== Minor league baseball (1993–1998) ===
Undrafted in the 1992 Major League Baseball draft, Redmond signed with the Florida Marlins as an undrafted free agent on August 18, 1992. He made his professional debut in minor league baseball with the Kane County Cougars of the Class A Midwest League in 1993, and also played for the Cougars in 1994. He was promoted to the Brevard County Manatees of the Class A-Advanced Florida State League in 1994, and the Portland Sea Dogs of the Class AA Eastern League in 1995. After playing with Portland in 1996, he was promoted to the Charlotte Knights of the Class AAA International League in 1997. Redmond had shoulder surgery in 1997, and was presented the option of playing for Portland or remaining with the organization as a coach. Redmond opted to continue playing, returning to Portland in 1998.

=== Florida Marlins (1998–2004) ===
Redmond made his Major League debut with Florida on May 31, 1998, against the Milwaukee Brewers, receiving the opportunity after the Marlins traded Charles Johnson and Mike Piazza. In his first career game, Redmond went 3-for-3, and hit his first major league home run in the sixth inning off Brewers pitcher Scott Karl. Despite his efforts, the Marlins lost 7–6. Redmond hit .331 with two home runs and 12 RBI in 37 games that year for the Marlins. He played with the Marlins as a backup catcher, often sharing time with Johnson, Jorge Fábregas, and Paul Bako. In 2002, Redmond posted career-highs in both batting average (.305) and games played (89). In the following season, he served as the backup to Iván Rodríguez, as the Marlins won the 2003 World Series. When the Marlins fell into a slump in 2003, he would take batting practice wearing only batting gloves, socks, and shoes.

In 2004, with Rodríguez signing with the Detroit Tigers, Redmond split catching duties with Ramón Castro. However, he got injured early into the season when, while running the bases, his left pinky finger was spiked by Marcus Giles, resulting in a chipped fracture. Redmond finished the 2004 season batting .256 with two home runs and 25 RBI in 81 games.

=== Minnesota Twins (2005–2009) ===
On November 24, 2004, Redmond signed a two-year, $1.8 million contract with the Minnesota Twins to backup starting catcher Joe Mauer. His 2005 season ended prematurely due to a torn plantar fascia in his right foot. During the 2006 season, Redmond signed a two-year contract extension with a club option for the 2009 season. He played in 82 games during the 2007 season due to an injury to Mauer, though he continued to play through his own injuries, including a broken finger, bruised shoulder, and stitches in his head. During the 2008 season, Redmond frequently joined Dan Gladden on the Twins Radio Network live broadcasts prior to the game to give his insight from the dugout. After the 2008 season, the Twins exercised an option on Redmond's contract, paying him $950,000 for the 2009 season. He suffered injury in the beginning of the 2009 season in a game against the Seattle Mariners; after escaping unscathed from a hit to the shoulder by a broken bat, Redmond aggravated a groin muscle while attempting to run out a ground ball.

On May 28, 2009, Redmond was ejected from a game for the first time in his career after a furious reaction to a safe call at home plate. The call occurred in a game against the Boston Red Sox that saw both teams have their managers and catchers ejected in the same inning. Redmond successfully relayed an outfield assist from Jason Kubel and tagged Jeff Bailey out just before he reached home plate—which subsequent replays confirmed—but home plate umpire Todd Tichenor ruled that Bailey was safe. Redmond then got into a face-to-face argument with Tichenor, which led to his ejection. Tichenor also ejected Twins manager Ron Gardenhire for defending Redmond, before subsequently throwing both Terry Francona and Jason Varitek out for an unrelated matter.

=== Cleveland Indians (2010) ===
The Twins let Redmond leave after the 2009 season, opting to use Drew Butera and José Morales as their backup catchers. On January 15, 2010, Redmond signed a one-year contract with a guaranteed salary of $850,000 to play for the Cleveland Indians. The Indians credited Redmond with helping Fausto Carmona have a strong start to the 2010 season. He committed an error on May 23, 2010, which was his first error since July 22, 2004. The 253-game streak without an error set a new MLB record for catchers, besting Mike Matheny's 252 consecutive errorless games from 2002 to 2004. However, Redmond batted .206 with 5 RBI in 22 games, and was designated for assignment on July 10, 2010, to make room on the 40-man roster for catcher/outfielder Chris Gimenez. Redmond had only played in three games since June 8, and the Indians wanted to develop their younger players. On July 16, 2010, Redmond was released by the Indians.

=== Coaching and managing career ===
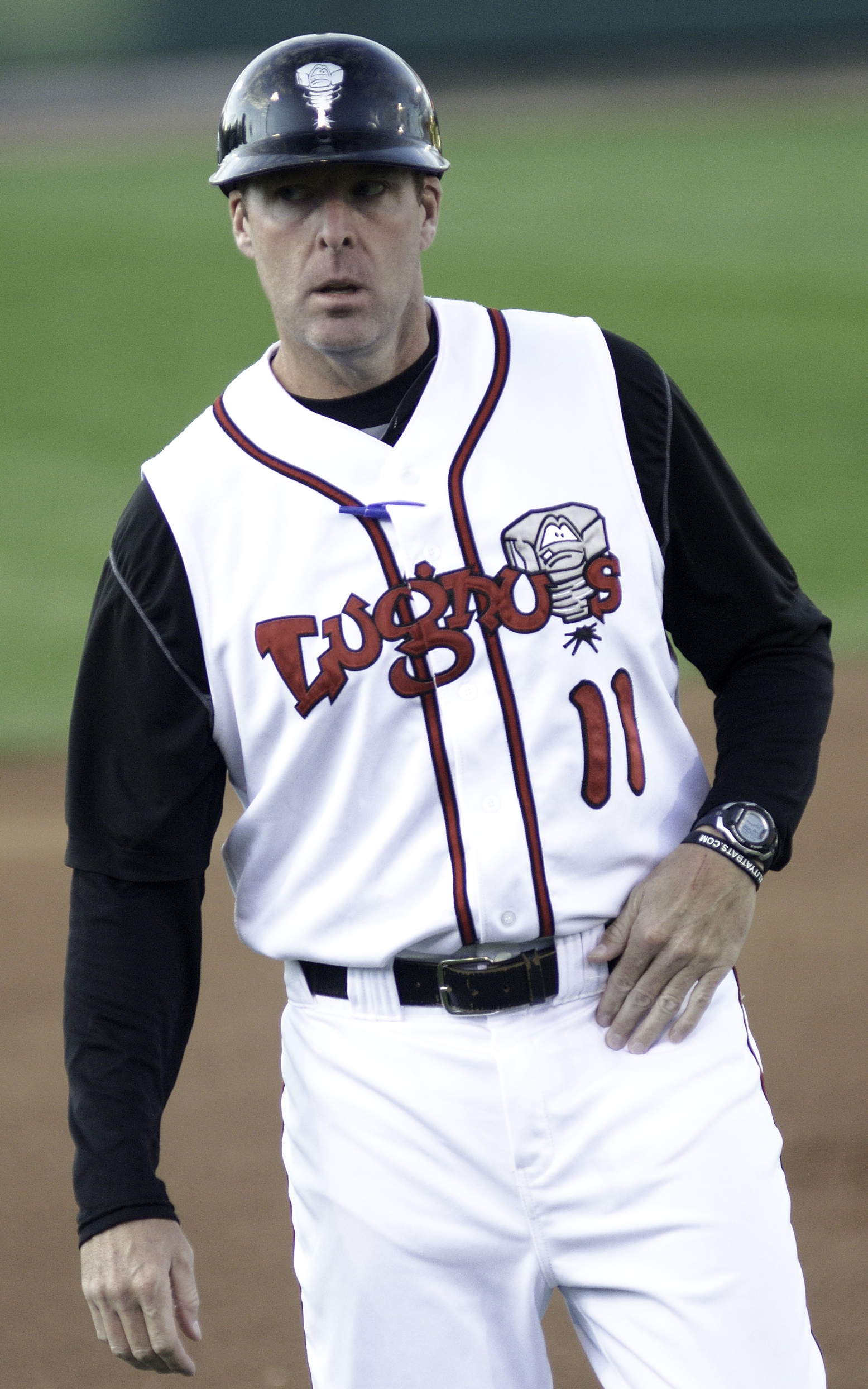
Redmond as Lansing Lugnuts manager, 2011

Redmond retired on October 4, 2010. In 2011, Redmond managed the Lansing Lugnuts of the Midwest League, the Class A affiliate of the Toronto Blue Jays. The Lugnuts had their best record in team history under Redmond, and reached the league finals. He was named Midwest League Manager of the Year. In 2012, he managed the Dunedin Blue Jays of the Florida State League, the Blue Jays' Class A-Advanced affiliate.

On November 1, 2012, Redmond was named manager of the Miami Marlins, and given a three-year deal. After the conclusion of the 2014 season, Redmond received a contract extension until 2017.

After struggling to start the 2015 season, rumors indicated that Marlins' owner Jeffrey Loria, was considering firing Redmond. The Marlins fired Redmond on May 17, just under an hour after the Marlins lost to the Braves, leaving the team at 16–22 on the season.

On November 16, 2016, Redmond was hired as the bench coach for the Colorado Rockies.

On May 11, 2025, after a franchise-worst 7–33 start to the season, Redmond along with manager Bud Black were dismissed by the team.

=== Managerial record ===
Team	From	To	Regular season record			Post–season record		
Team	From	To	W	L	Win %	W	L	Win %
Miami Marlins	2013	2015	155	207	.428	0	0	–
Total			155	207	.428	0	0	–

=== Playing and managing style ===
As a catcher, Redmond was known for his skill in calling the right pitches for the pitcher to throw. He was also noted for his veteran leadership and clubhouse presence. He was also known for his defensive ability. He caught R. A. Dickey and Dennis Springer, who both threw a knuckleball, considered a difficult pitch to catch. Redmond is tied for fourth in career fielding percentage as a catcher, finishing with 99.6%.

=== Honors ===
In 1999, Redmond won the Charlie Hough Good Guy Award. He was inducted into the Unum Portland Sea Dogs Hall of Fame in 2010. However, Redmond could not attend the induction ceremony due to his family commitments.

== Personal ==
Mike and his wife Michele (née Rowe) have two sons, Ryan and Michael. They live in Spokane, Washington.

Sporting positions
Preceded by Tom Runnells	Colorado Rockies Bench Coach; 2017–	Succeeded by Incumbent
