= Ramón Castro (catcher) =

Puerto Rican baseball player (born 1976)

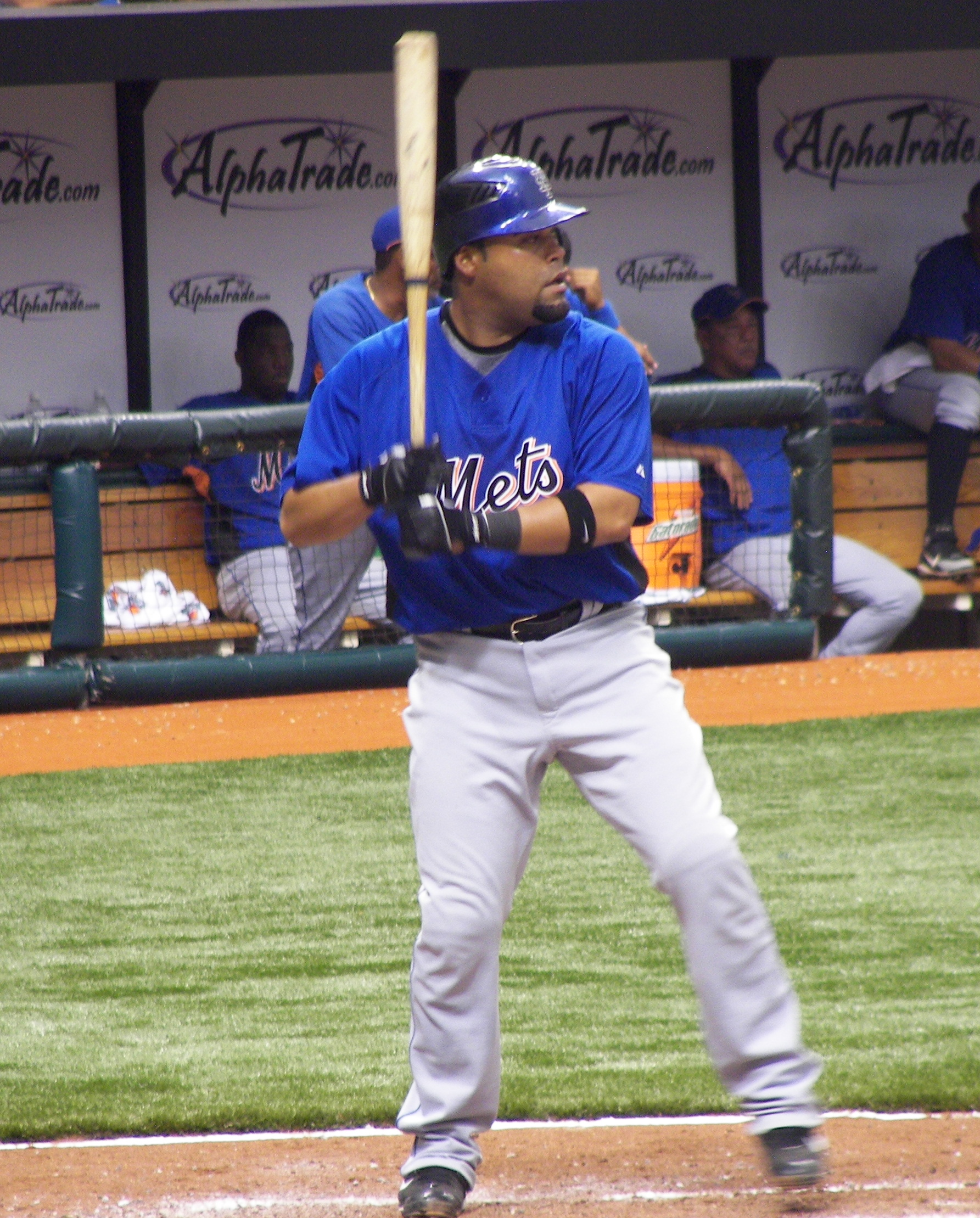
- Castro with the New York Mets
- Catcher
- Born: March 1, 1976 (age 50); Vega Baja, Puerto Rico
- Batted: Right Threw: Right

MLB debut
- August 27, 1999, for the Florida Marlins

Last MLB appearance
- July 9, 2011, for the Chicago White Sox

MLB statistics
- Batting average: .237
- Home runs: 67
- Runs batted in: 217
- Stats at Baseball Reference

Teams
- Florida Marlins (1999–2004); New York Mets (2005–2009); Chicago White Sox (2009–2011)

Ramón Abraham Castro (born March 1, 1976) is a Puerto Rican former professional baseball catcher, who played in Major League Baseball (MLB) for the Florida Marlins, New York Mets and Chicago White Sox.

== Career ==
=== Early career ===
On June 2, 1994, Castro was selected by the Houston Astros in the first round (17th overall pick) of the Major League Baseball draft, becoming the first player to be drafted out of Puerto Rico in the first round. He remained the highest-selected player drafted directly from a Puerto Rico high school until 2012, when Carlos Correa became the first overall pick.

=== Florida Marlins ===
He was traded to the Florida Marlins in 1998 for relief pitcher Jay Powell.

Castro made his major league debut on August 27, 1999 in a game against the Houston Astros. He spent 1999 and 2000 competing with Mike Redmond for playing time and, when Charles Johnson arrived in Florida, Castro spent most of the 2001 season in the minor leagues. In 2002, he was back in the majors but as a third option and, in 2003, he played behind Iván Rodríguez as the Marlins won the 2003 World Series. However, Castro did not appear in the series. In 2004 Rodríguez was gone, giving Castro his first opportunity as a starter but a .135 batting average and an early-June season-ending injury finished his time in Florida. Paul Lo Duca finished out the Marlins' catching duties for 2004. The Marlins released Castro in October 2004.

Castro is known as a good defensive catcher, but, despite showing occasional home run power, he was never allowed to get enough at bats to show his sufficient hitting skills to win a job as a starter, along with struggling with injuries throughout his career. While never hitting for a superior average, however, his homeruns are often well-timed.

=== New York Mets ===
In December 2004, Castro signed with the New York Mets. In 2005, he was backup catcher to Mike Piazza, with 41 RBIs in 209 at-bats, a career-best .244 batting average, and playing solid defense.

When Piazza became a free agent after the season, it looked like Castro might again get a chance to be a starter, but the Mets traded for Paul Lo Duca who previously had replaced Castro in Florida. Injuries further reduced his role in 2006, limiting him to 126 at-bats.

When Lo Duca left after the 2007 season, many fans called for Castro to start, but the job instead went to newcomer Brian Schneider. It was most likely due to his injury-riddled career, which became evident once more when he strained his hamstring late in spring training that year, missing the beginning of the season.

=== Chicago White Sox ===
On May 29, 2009, Ramon was traded to the Chicago White Sox for pitcher Lance Broadway after Omir Santos won the backup job with the return of Brian Schneider from the DL.

On July 23, 2009, Castro became the 17th backstop in Major League Baseball history to catch a perfect game, receiving Mark Buehrle's second no-hitter. It was his first time catching for Buehrle, who stated afterwards that he did not shake off Castro at any time during the game.

On January 12, 2010, Castro re-signed with the Chicago White Sox on a 1-year $800,000 contract with a club option for 2011. He played in 37 games in 2010 and 23 games in 2011.

=== Los Angeles Dodgers ===
On January 3, 2013, After not playing in 2012, Castro signed a minor league contract with the Los Angeles Dodgers. He was released on March 18, 2013.

=== Long Island Ducks ===
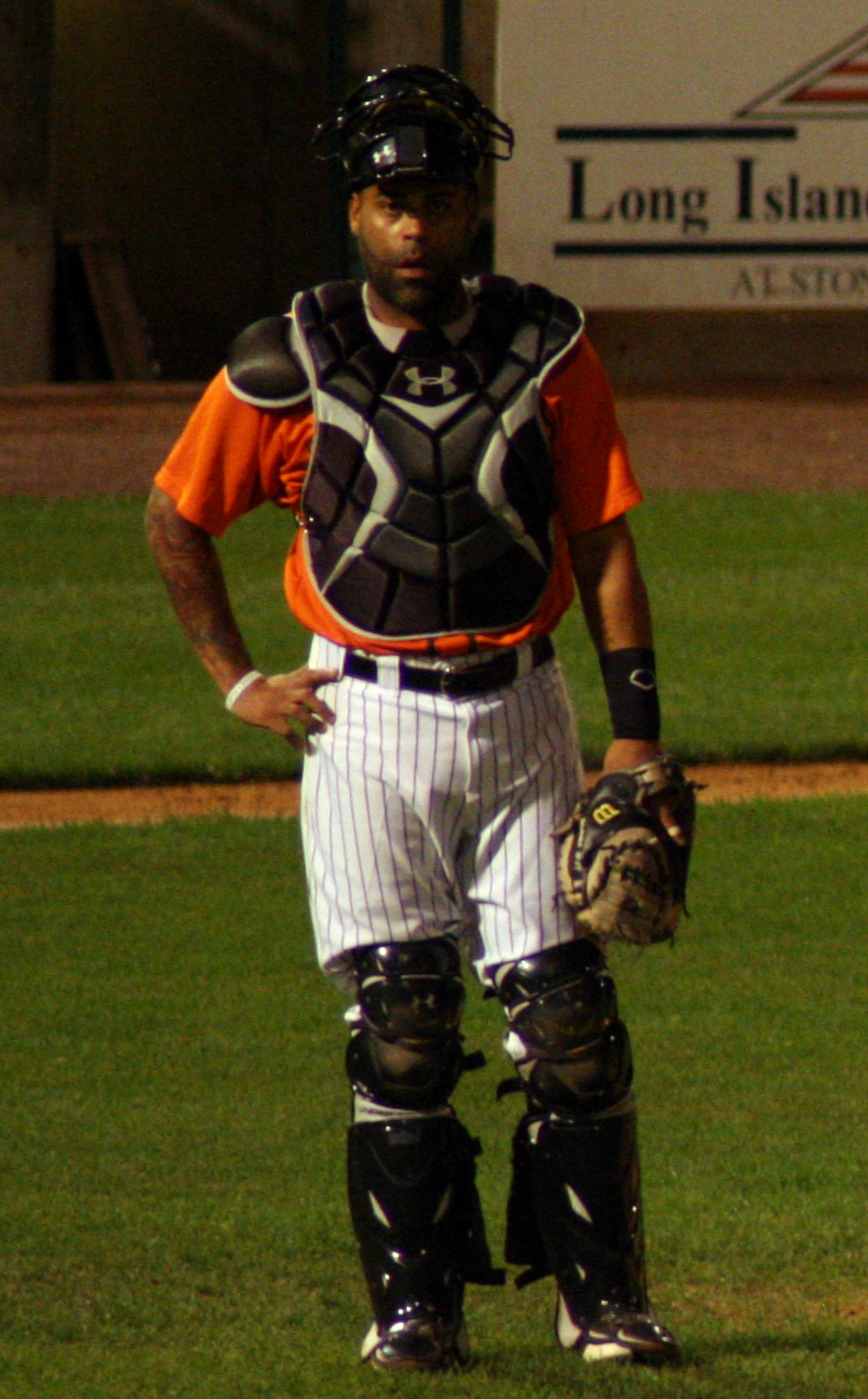
Castro playing for the Long Island Ducks of the Atlantic League of Professional Baseball in 2013

On April 6, 2013, Castro signed with the Long Island Ducks of the Atlantic League of Professional Baseball. He became a free agent following the season. In 81 games he hit .260/.295/.378 with 8 home runs and 31 RBIs.

=== Telemarket Rimini ===
On December 27, 2013, Castro signed a contract to play with Telemarket Rimini of Italian Baseball League for the 2014 season.

== Personal life ==
Castro is married with three daughters and has another daughter from a previous relationship. The family resides in Miramar, Florida.

== See also ==
- List of Major League Baseball players from Puerto Rico
