= Miami Marlins =

Major League Baseball franchise in Miami, Florida

- 2026 Miami Marlins season

Logo	Cap insignia
- Established in 1993

Major league affiliations
- National League (1993–present); East Division (1993–present)

Current uniform
- Retired numbers: 42

Colors
- Midnight black, Miami blue, Caliente red, Slate grey

Name
- Miami Marlins (2012–present); Florida Marlins (1993–2011)

Nicknames
- The Fish

Ballpark
- LoanDepot Park (2012–present); Sun Life Stadium (1993–2011)

Major league titles
- World Series titles (2): 1997; 2003
- NL pennants (2): 1997; 2003
- East division titles (0): None
- Wild card berths (4): 1997; 2003; 2020; 2023

Front office
- Principal owner: Bruce Sherman
- President: Caroline O'Connor (President of Business Operations)
- President of baseball operations: Peter Bendix
- General manager: Gabe Kapler
- Manager: Clayton McCullough
- Website: mlb.com/marlins

The Miami Marlins are an American professional baseball team based in Miami. The Marlins compete in Major League Baseball (MLB) as a member club of the National League (NL) East Division. The team plays its home games at LoanDepot Park.

The franchise began play as an expansion team in the 1993 season as the Florida Marlins. The Marlins originally played home games at Joe Robbie Stadium, which they shared with the Miami Dolphins of the National Football League (NFL). In 2012, the team moved to LoanDepot Park (then known as Marlins Park), their first exclusive home designed for baseball. As part of an agreement with the park owner, Miami-Dade County, to use the stadium, the franchise changed its name to the Miami Marlins prior to the 2012 season.

With a record of 2,382–2,792 (.460), the Marlins have the second lowest winning percentage and fewest postseason appearances (four) among active MLB franchises. Despite this, the Marlins won the World Series during their first two playoff runs in 1997 and 2003. Jeff Conine (an inaugural member of the franchise) was the only player to appear for the Marlins in the World Series in both of their championship seasons.

All four of their playoff appearances came as wild card teams, making them one of two MLB franchises (along with the Colorado Rockies) to have never won a division title, as well as the only franchise to have never appeared in back-to-back postseasons. The Marlins were the first team to win the World Series as a wild card.

The franchise's only retired number is Jackie Robinson's universally retired #42. (Note: The Marlins formerly retired number #5 for inaugural Marlins team president Carl Barger, who collapsed and died at the 1992 winter meetings. The Marlins retired number 5 in honor of Barger's favorite player, Joe DiMaggio, but the team chose to issue the number when they moved into their new stadium in 2012 and instead honored Barger with a plaque at their new park. Logan Morrison was the first to wear #5, for the 2012 season, and several players have since worn the number.) However, #16 has been out of circulation since the death of José Fernández in 2016.

== History ==
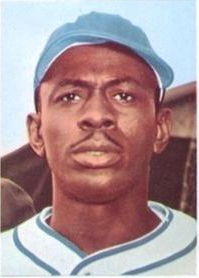
Hall of Famer Satchel Paige pitched for the Miami Marlins (AAA) from 1956 to 1958.

Wayne Huizenga, CEO of Blockbuster Entertainment Corporation, was awarded an expansion franchise in the National League (NL) for a $95 million expansion fee and the team began operations in 1993 as the Florida Marlins. MLB had announced a few months earlier that it intended to add two new teams to the National League. It was a foregone conclusion that one of them would be placed in Florida; the only question was whether Huizenga would beat out competing groups from Orlando and Tampa Bay. Orlando waged a very spirited campaign bolstered by its family-oriented tourism industry. Tampa Bay already had a baseball park—the Florida Suncoast Dome in St. Petersburg, completed in 1990. However, on June 10, 1991, the National League awarded a Miami-based franchise to Huizenga. The franchise adopted the name "Marlins" from previous minor league teams, the Miami Marlins of the Triple-A International League from 1956 to 1960, and the Miami Marlins (1962–70) and Miami Marlins (1982–88) teams that played in the Florida State League.

The Marlins' first manager was Rene Lachemann, a former catcher who had previously managed the Seattle Mariners and Milwaukee Brewers, and who at the time of his hiring was a third base coach for the Oakland Athletics. The team drafted its initial lineup of players in the 1992 MLB Expansion Draft. The Marlins defeated the Houston Astros 12–8 in their inaugural spring training game. Jeff Conine hit Florida's first homer before a crowd of 6,696 at the Cocoa Expo Sports Complex. The Marlins won their first game on April 5, 1993, against the Dodgers. Charlie Hough was the starting pitcher for that game. Jeff Conine went 4-for-4 as well, making him an immediate crowd favorite. By the end of his tenure with Florida, he had earned the nickname "Mr. Marlin." Gary Sheffield and Bryan Harvey represented the Marlins as the club's first All-Star Game selections, and Sheffield homered in the Marlins' first All-Star Game at-bat. The team finished the year five games ahead of the last-place New York Mets and with an attendance of 3,064,847. In that season, the Marlins traded young set-up reliever Trevor Hoffman and two minor-league prospects to the San Diego Padres for third baseman Gary Sheffield. While Sheffield helped Florida immediately and became an all-star, Hoffman eventually emerged as the best closer in the National League. After the 1993 season, Donald A. Smiley was named the second president in club history. The Marlins finished last (51–64) in their division in the strike-shortened season of 1994 and fourth (67–76) in 1995. Lachemann was replaced as manager midway through the 1996 season by director of player development John Boles.

=== 1997: First World Series title ===
Following an 80–82 record in 1996, former Pittsburgh Pirates manager Jim Leyland was hired to lead the club heading into 1997.

In 1997, the Marlins finished nine games back of the Division Champion Atlanta Braves, but earned the wild card berth. Veteran additions such as LF Moisés Alou, 3B Bobby Bonilla, and trade-deadline additions Darren Daulton and Jim Eisenreich added experience and clutch hits. Talented young stars Luis Castillo (2B) and Édgar Rentería (SS) comprised one of the best double play combos in the NL. The Marlins swept the San Francisco Giants 3–0 in the National League Division Series, and then went on to beat the Atlanta Braves 4–2 in the National League Championship Series, overcoming the loss of Alex Fernandez to a torn rotator cuff, and Kevin Brown to a virus. Brown's place was taken in Game 5 by rookie pitcher Liván Hernández, who struck out 15 Braves and outdueled multiple Cy Young Award winner Greg Maddux to a 2–1 victory. The underdog Marlins went on to face the Cleveland Indians in the 1997 World Series, and won in seven games. In Game 7, Craig Counsell's sacrifice fly in the bottom of the ninth tied the game at 2, then, with the bases loaded and two outs in the bottom of the 11th, Édgar Rentería's soft liner glanced off the glove of Cleveland pitcher Charles Nagy and into center field to score Counsell and give the Marlins the win.

=== 2003: Second World Series victory ===
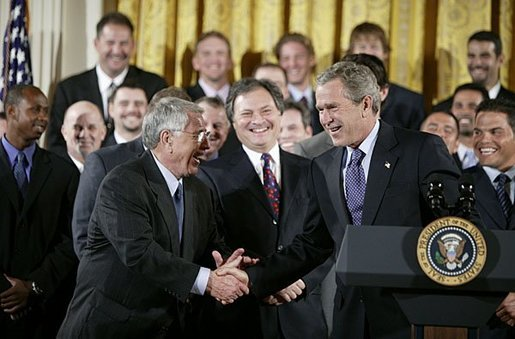
Shaking hands with manager Jack McKeon, President George W. Bush hosts a visit by the 2003 World Series Champions, the Florida Marlins, to the White House Friday, January 23, 2004.

On May 9, the Marlins called up high-kicking southpaw Dontrelle Willis from the Double-A Carolina Mudcats and helped carry the injury-plagued Marlins with an 11–2 record in his first 17 starts. Miguel Cabrera (also from the Mudcats) filled in well, hitting a walk-off home run in his first major league game, against the Tampa Bay Devil Rays at Pro Player Stadium. Both Willis and Cabrera would later prove to be essential parts of the Marlins' playoff success. Jeff Conine – an original Marlin and member of the 1997 World Series team – returned from Baltimore, Hall of Fame catcher Iván Rodríguez signed with the Marlins as a free agent and closer Ugueth Urbina arrived from the Texas Rangers. These acquisitions helped to keep the team in contention, and although they finished ten games behind the Braves, the Marlins captured the NL wild card.

On October 15, the Marlins defeated the Chicago Cubs four games to three in the 2003 National League Championship Series, coming back from a 3–1 deficit. Game 6 saw the Marlins play a role in one of baseball's most infamous moments, the Steve Bartman incident. With one out in the eighth inning and the Cubs three runs ahead, Marlins second baseman Luis Castillo hit a pop foul a row into the stands along the third baseline. Cubs fan Steve Bartman reached for the ball, preventing Cubs left fielder Moisés Alou from making the out and setting off an eight-run Marlins rally. The incident with Bartman and a come-from-behind win in Wrigley Field in Game 7 helped the Marlins capture their second NL pennant, keeping the "Curse of the Billy Goat" alive and well.

In the 2003 World Series, the Marlins defeated the heavily favored New York Yankees in six games, winning the sixth game in Yankee Stadium. Shortstop Álex González helped the Marlins win Game 4 of the series with a walk-off home run in extra innings. Josh Beckett was named the Most Valuable Player for the series after twirling a five-hit complete-game shutout in Game 6. Skipper Jack McKeon became the oldest manager ever to win a World Series title.

=== 2012–present ===
In 2012, the team moved from the football-oriented Sun Life Stadium in Miami Gardens to Marlins Park in downtown Miami. As a condition of the move, the team was renamed the Miami Marlins, and adopted a new logo and colors. On November 16, 2017, Giancarlo Stanton won the National League MVP, becoming the first Marlin to win the award.

During the 2020 shortened season, the Marlins finished with a 31–29 overall record and 2nd place in the NL East. In the Wild Card Series they swept the Chicago Cubs in 2 games. Miami lost in three games to the Atlanta Braves in the NLDS.

On November 13, 2020, the Marlins became the first club in any American major-level sports league to hire a woman to an executive position when Kim Ng was announced as the team's general manager. In addition, she became the MLB's first Asian American general manager. On February 28, 2022, it was announced Derek Jeter stepped down as CEO of the Marlins. On September 30, 2023, with the Marlins 7–3 win in Pittsburgh, the Marlins clinched their fourth postseason berth, making Kim Ng the first woman GM in MLB history to lead a playoff team.

== Uniform history ==
=== 1993–2002 ===
The Florida Marlins wore three different uniforms during their debut season. The primary and alternate home uniforms shared the same design: "Marlins" (with an underline after the letter "S") in teal with black trim and letters were rendered in black with teal trim, along with teal pinstripes. The alternate home uniforms were sleeveless, and teal undershirts were added to the ensemble. The road uniforms featured "Florida" (with the marlin wrapped around the letter "F") in teal with black trim and letters were rendered in black with teal trim. The primary logo patch was placed on the left sleeve. The Marlins wore three different cap designs, all featuring the "F" insignia in front of a leaping marlin. The all-teal home cap and the black-brimmed teal road cap were initially the primary headwear the team used, with the all-black cap as the alternate.

By the late 1990s, teal was gradually de-emphasized and the Marlins wore black caps and undershirts for the remainder of the uniform's run.

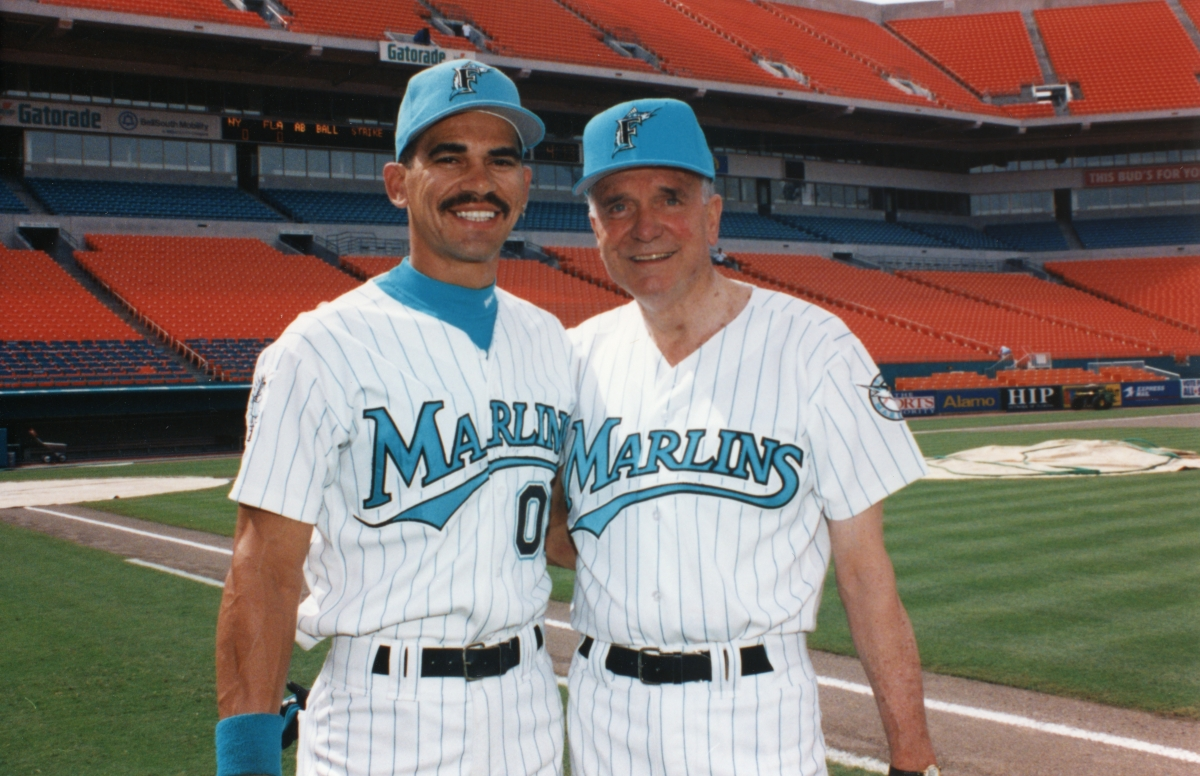
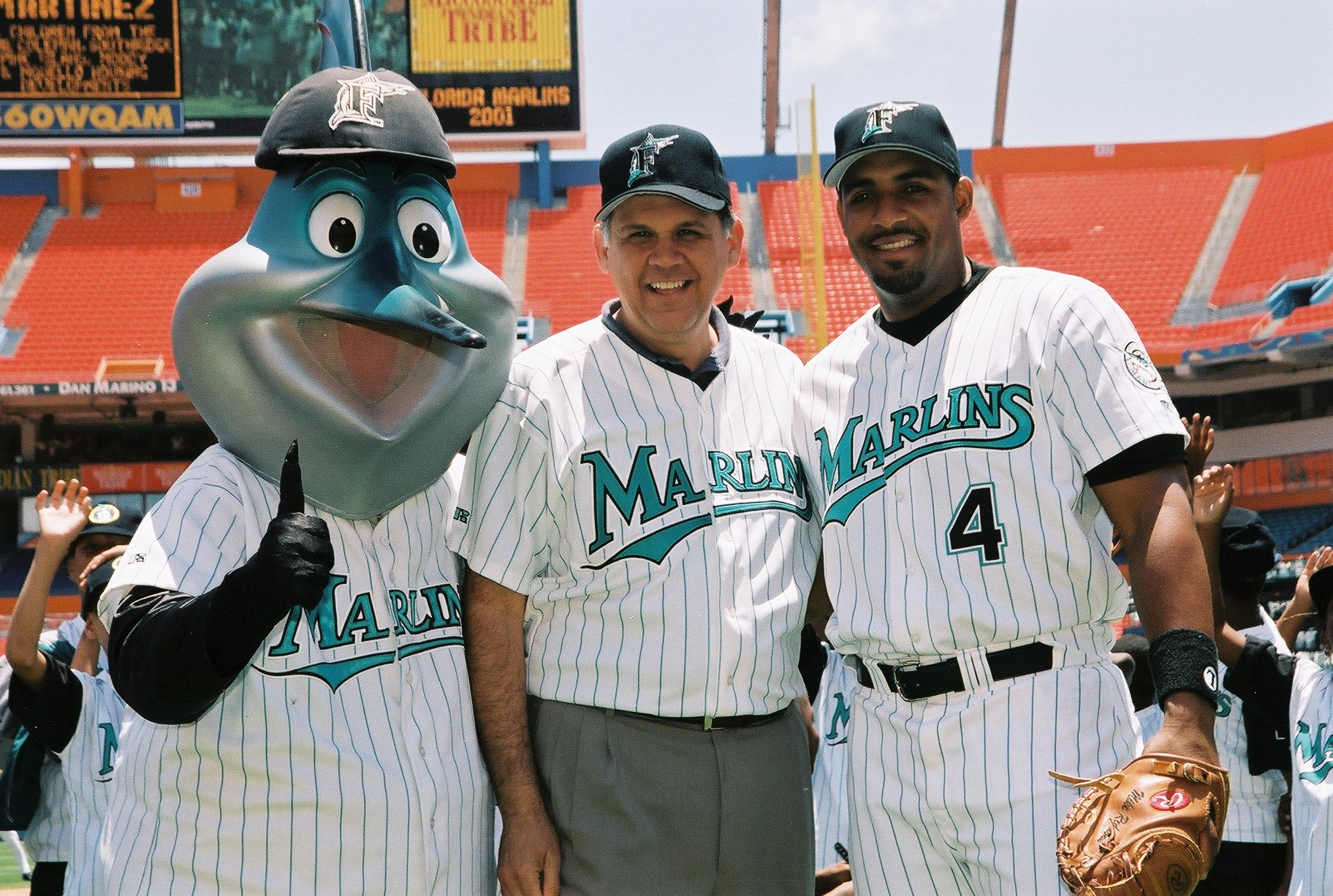
Benito Santiago and Florida Governor Lawton Chiles (left) in the original home uniform with teal caps; Lyle Mouton, Billy the Marlin and Secretary of Housing and Urban Development Mel Martínez (right) in the original home uniform with black caps.

=== 2003–2011 ===
The Marlins introduced new uniforms before their second World Series-winning season. On the home uniforms, teal was relegated to accent color status with black the primary lettering and pinstripe color. Silver accents were also added to the letters. A sleeved alternate pinstriped home uniform replaced the original sleeveless version, sharing the same design as the primary home uniform except with the "F" logo on the left chest. The "F" logo also took its place on the left sleeve in place of the primary logo. Road uniforms again featured "Florida" but shared the same script look and color scheme as the home uniform (with an underline after the letter "A"). White accents were added to the letters. In addition, the Marlins began wearing a black alternate uniform, featuring the same "Marlins" script but in silver with teal, black and white accents. Both alternate uniforms lacked the front chest numbers.

In 2010, the Marlins changed its road uniform design, replacing "Florida" with "Marlins". The sleeve logo patches were also removed.

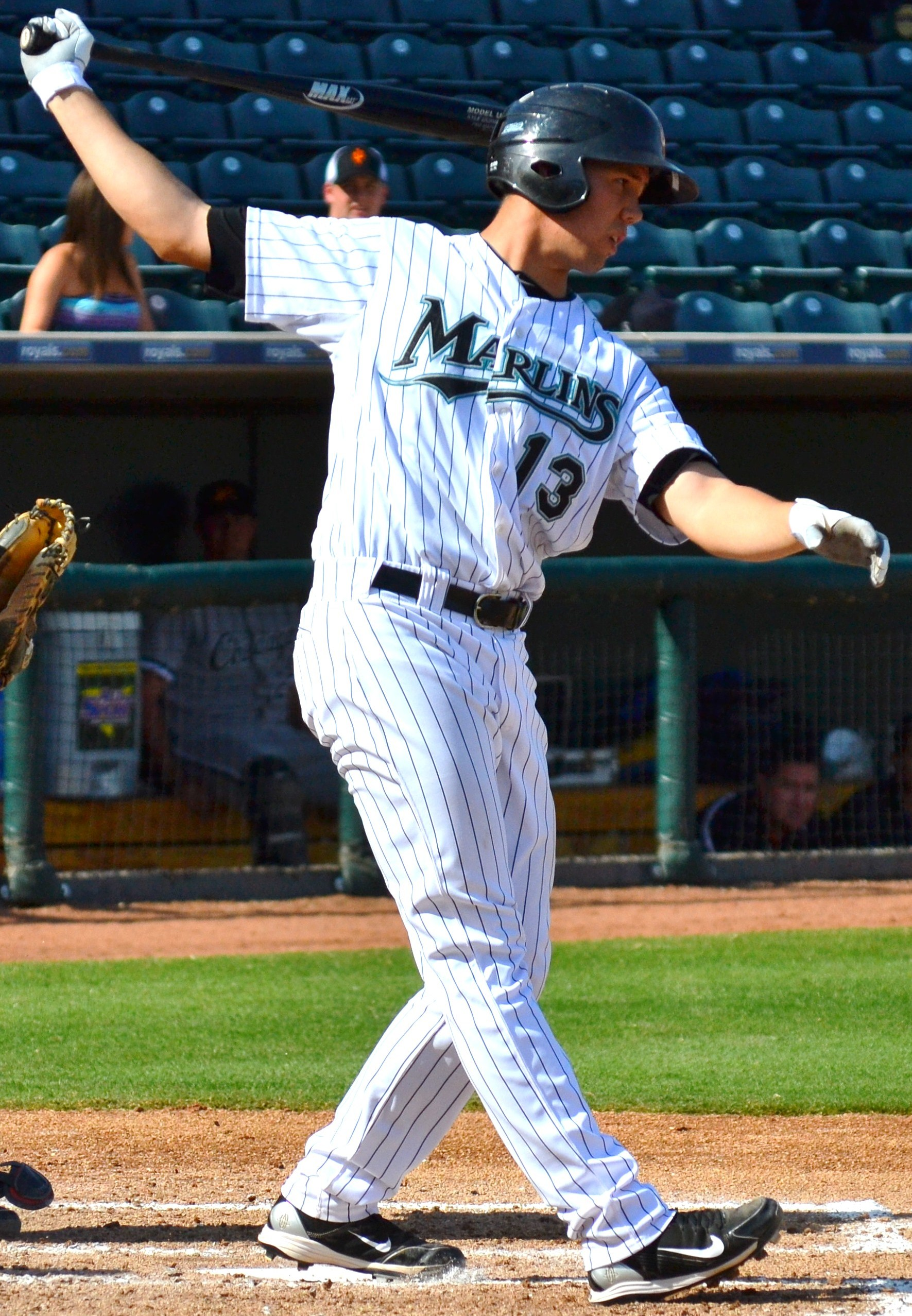
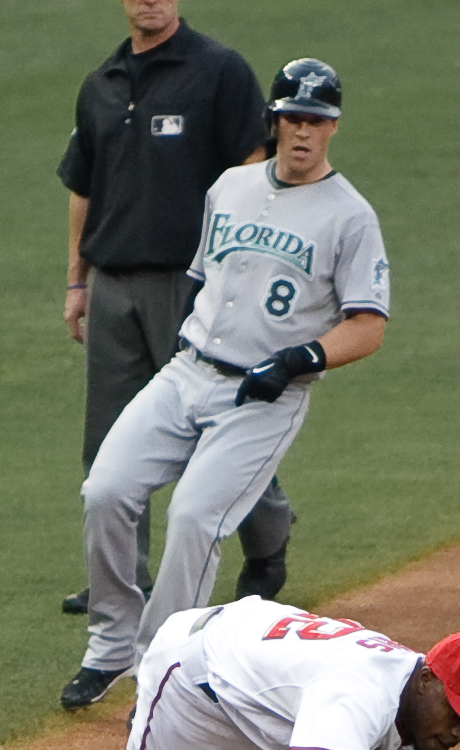
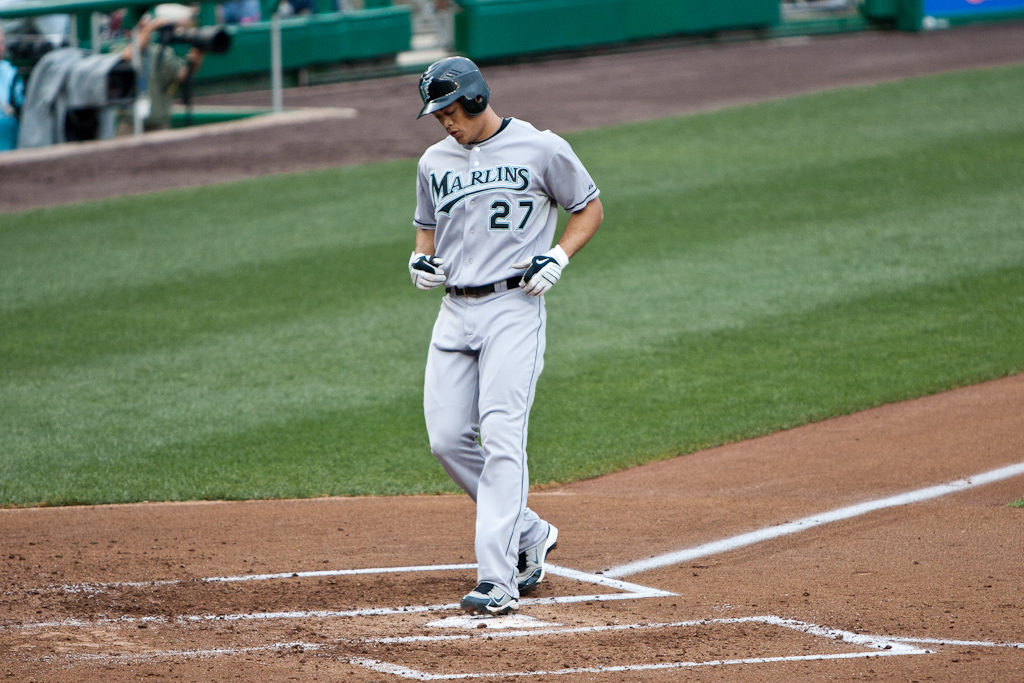
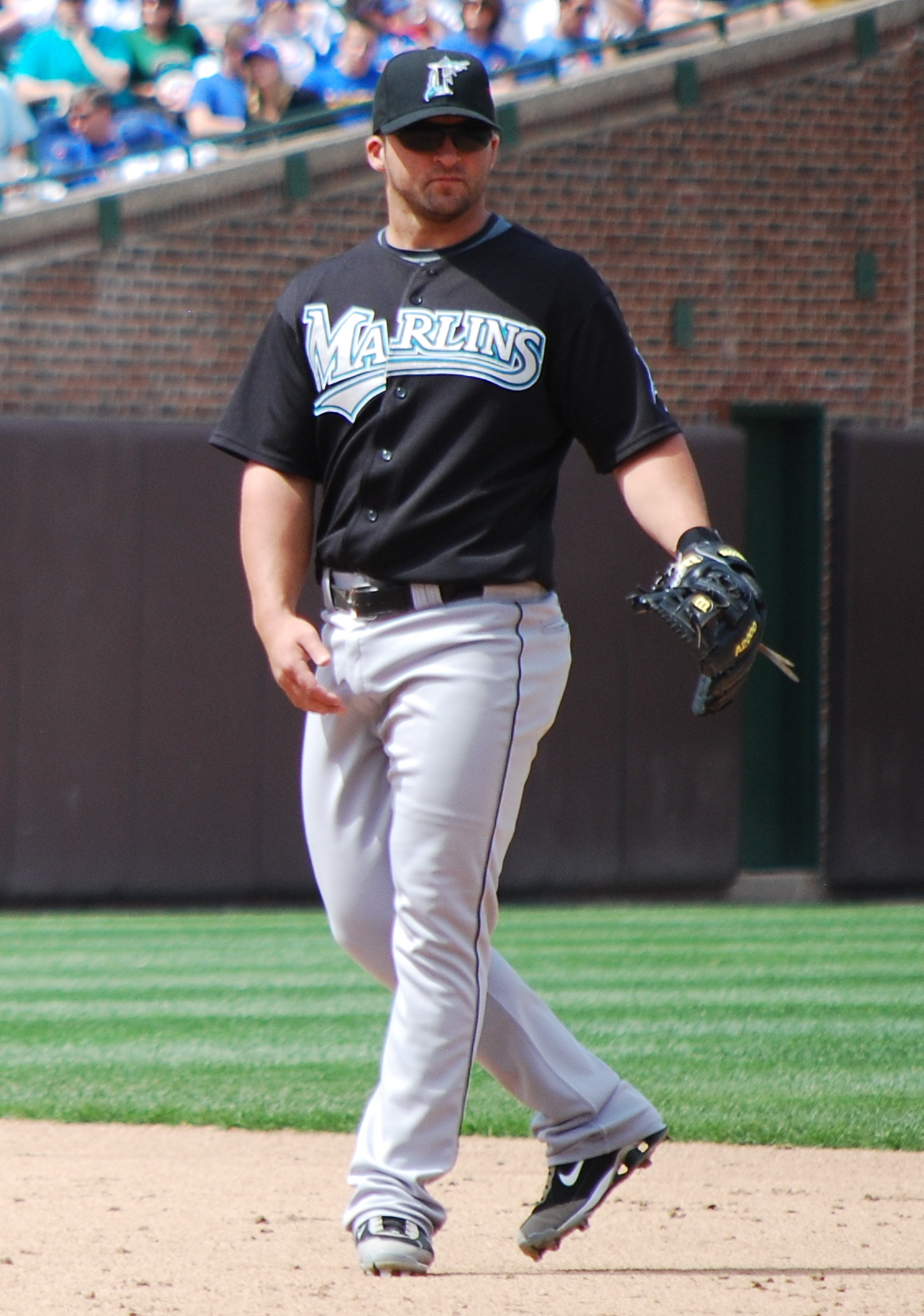
Kyle Skipworth (left) in the 2003–2011 home uniform; Chris Coghlan (2nd from left) in the 2003–2009 road uniform; Giancarlo Stanton (2nd from right) in the 2010–2011 road uniform; Dan Uggla (right) in the 2003–2011 black alternate uniform.

=== 2012–2018 ===
Rebranding as the Miami Marlins, the team introduced a new color scheme with orange, black and blue. The "M" insignia is white with orange, yellow and sky blue accents, along with a stylized abstract marlin on top. This logo served as a cap logo as well as a patch on the left sleeve. The primary home, road and black alternate uniforms all feature "Miami" in front, with the first "M" shaped similarly to the cap and sleeve logos. The home and road uniform feature black letters with silver trim, along with orange drop shadows on the numbers, while the alternate black uniform features white letters with silver trim and orange numbers with silver trim and black drop shadows. The orange alternate uniform featured the team name in white with sky blue accents; however, the abstract marlin was located atop the letter "I". Letters were black with silver trim, while sky blue drop shadows were featured on the numbers. The Marlins primarily wore all-black caps, though for a brief period they wore alternate all-orange caps.

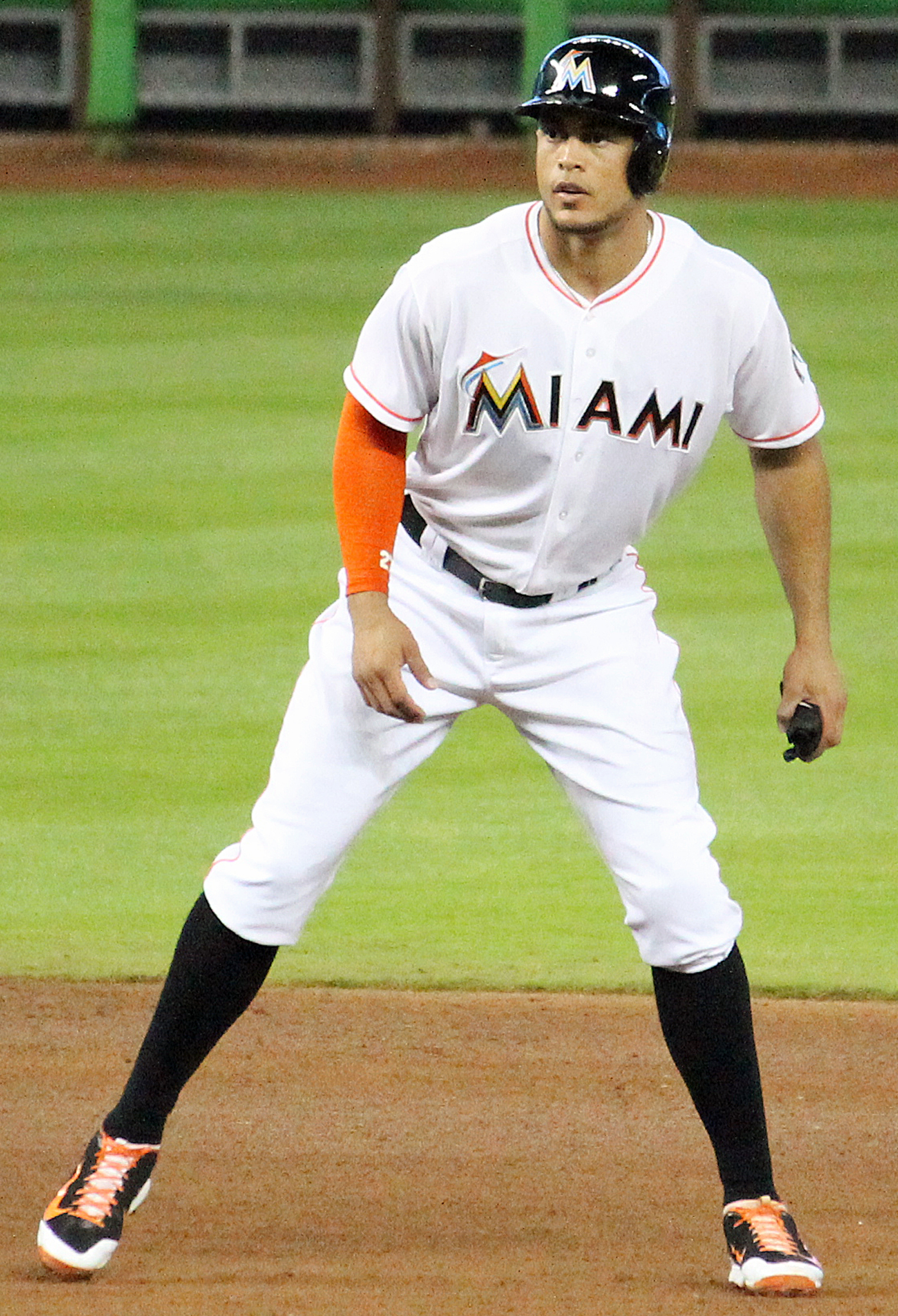
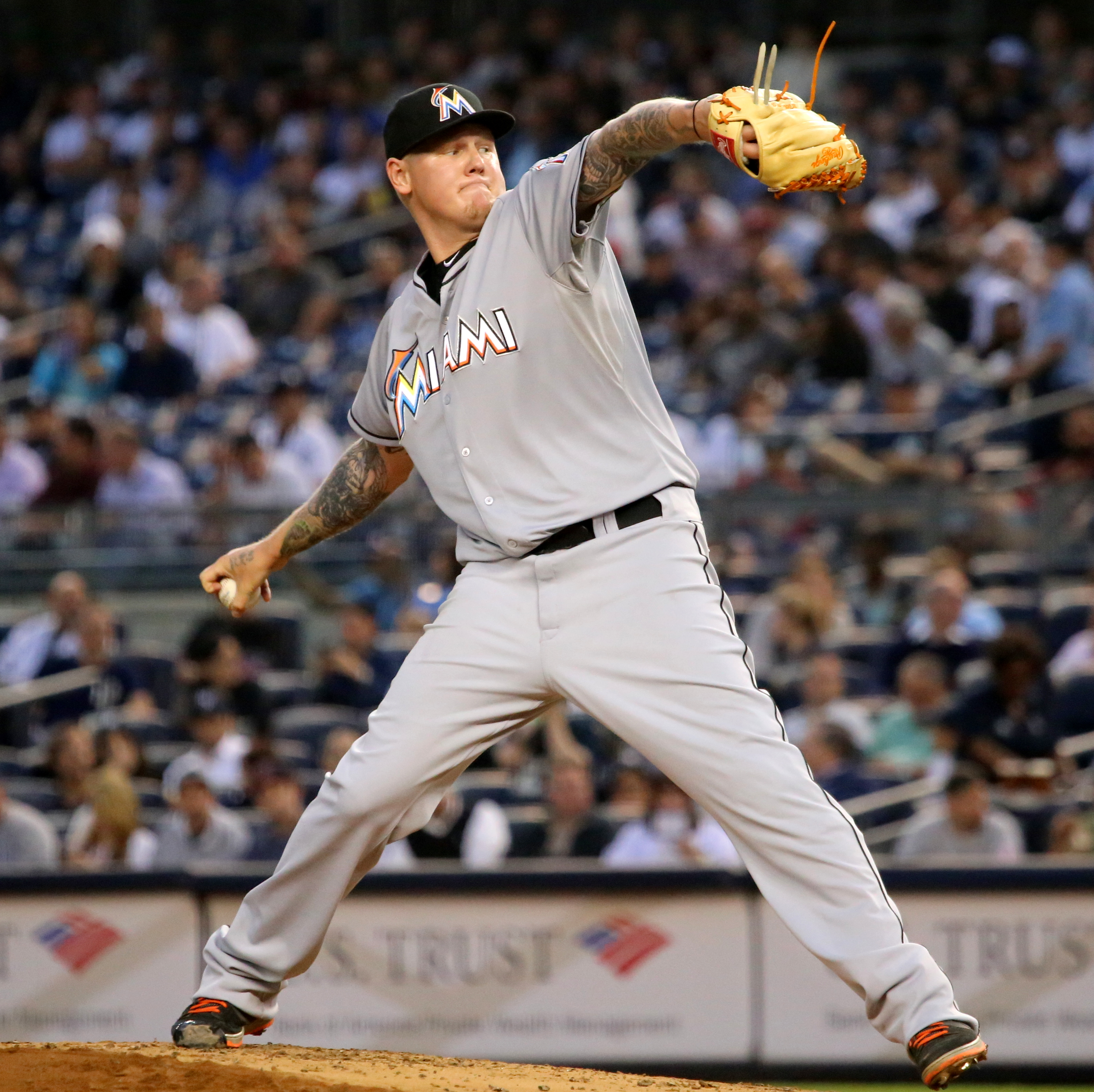
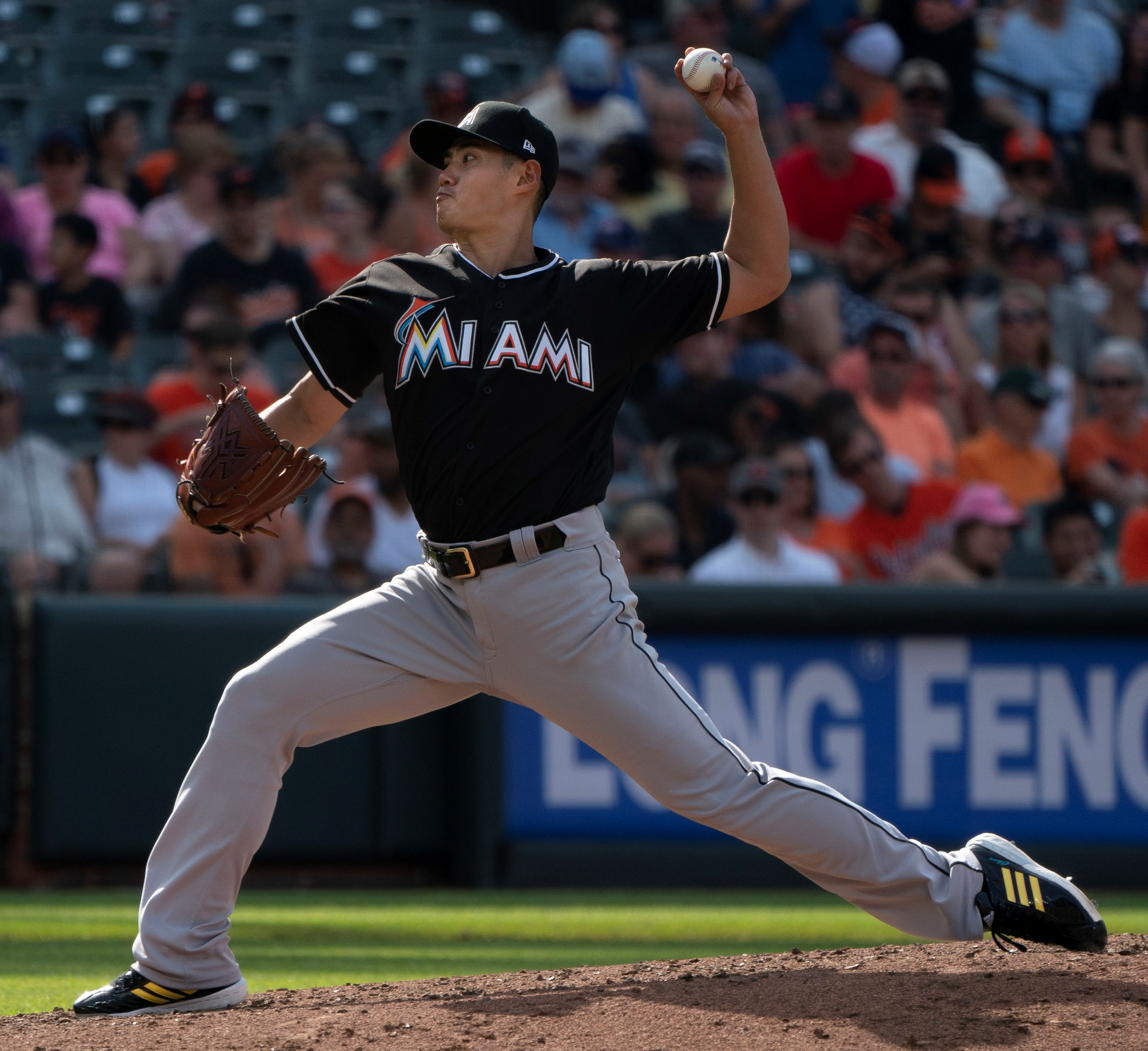
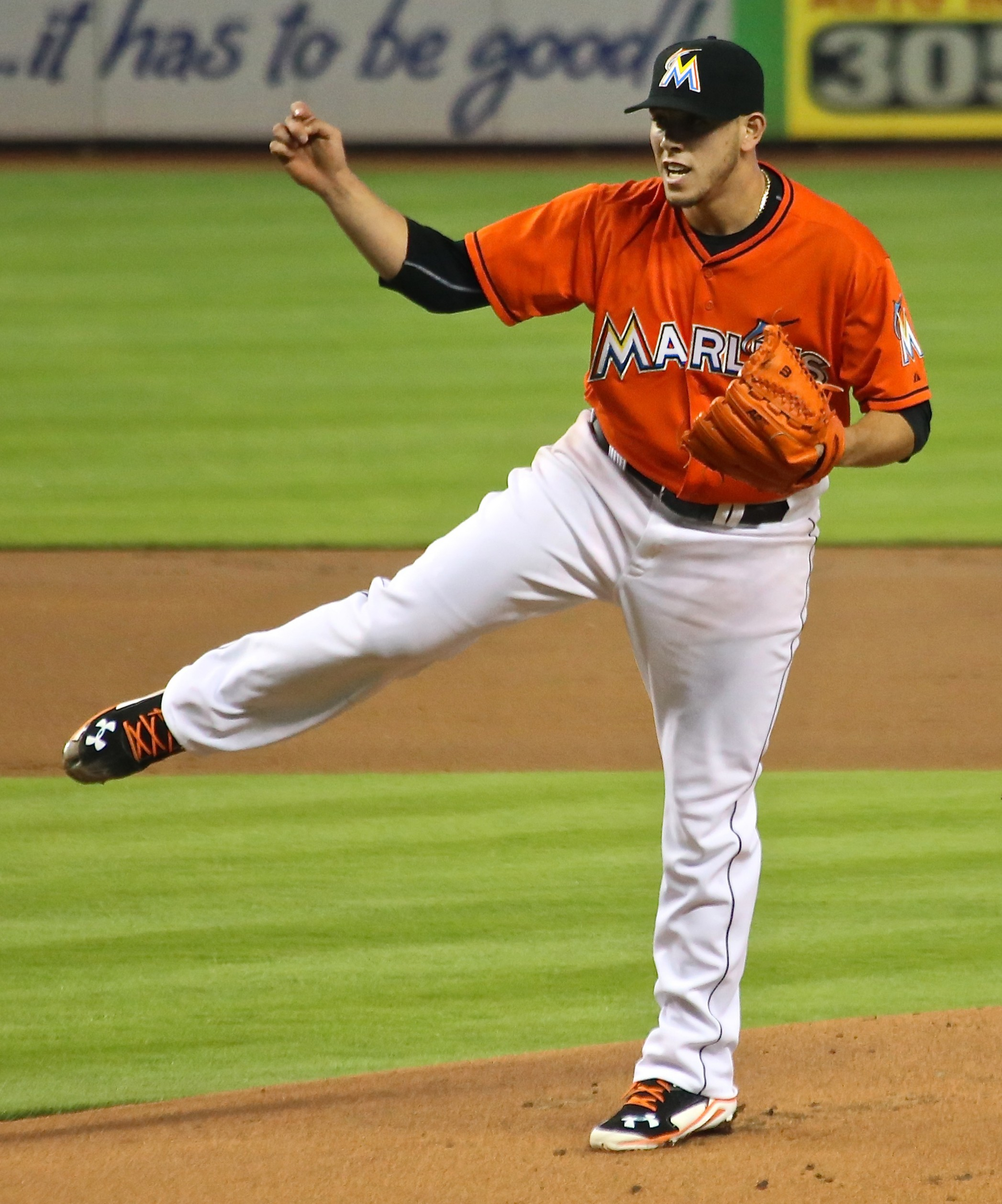
Giancarlo Stanton (left) in the 2012–2018 home uniform; Mat Latos (2nd from left) in the 2012–2018 road uniform; Wei-Yin Chen (2nd from right) in the 2012–2018 black alternate uniform; José Fernández (right) in the 2012–2018 orange alternate uniform.

=== 2019–present ===
The Marlins released updated logos and color schemes, replacing orange and silver with bright Caliente red, Miami blue and slate grey. Home and road uniforms contain 'Miami" and letters in black with red drop shadows and blue accents, while the black alternate uniform contain "Marlins" and letters in black with red drop shadows and blue accents. The cap logo, used on the all-black cap, is a stylized "M" with a more realistic marlin on top. The Marlin logo also appears on the left sleeve.

In 2021, the Marlins unveiled a City Connect uniform. The primarily red uniform with Miami blue trim paid homage to the Cuban Sugar Kings.

In 2024, the Marlins updated their black alternate uniform, changing the letters to white in order to improve visibility. They also introduced a new Miami blue alternate uniform, featuring the black "Marlins" lettering with white trim and red drop shadows. This was originally their Spring Training uniform, albeit with the "M" logo on the left chest.

The Marlins released a second City Connect uniform in 2025. The primarily black uniform with teal and pink accents paid homage to the vibrant Miami electric glow skyline and the original Florida Marlins look.

In 2026, the Marlins unveiled a teal throwback uniform which they would wear on home games every Sunday. The Marlins previously wore teal tops as their spring training uniform. These replaced the blue alternates in the rotation.

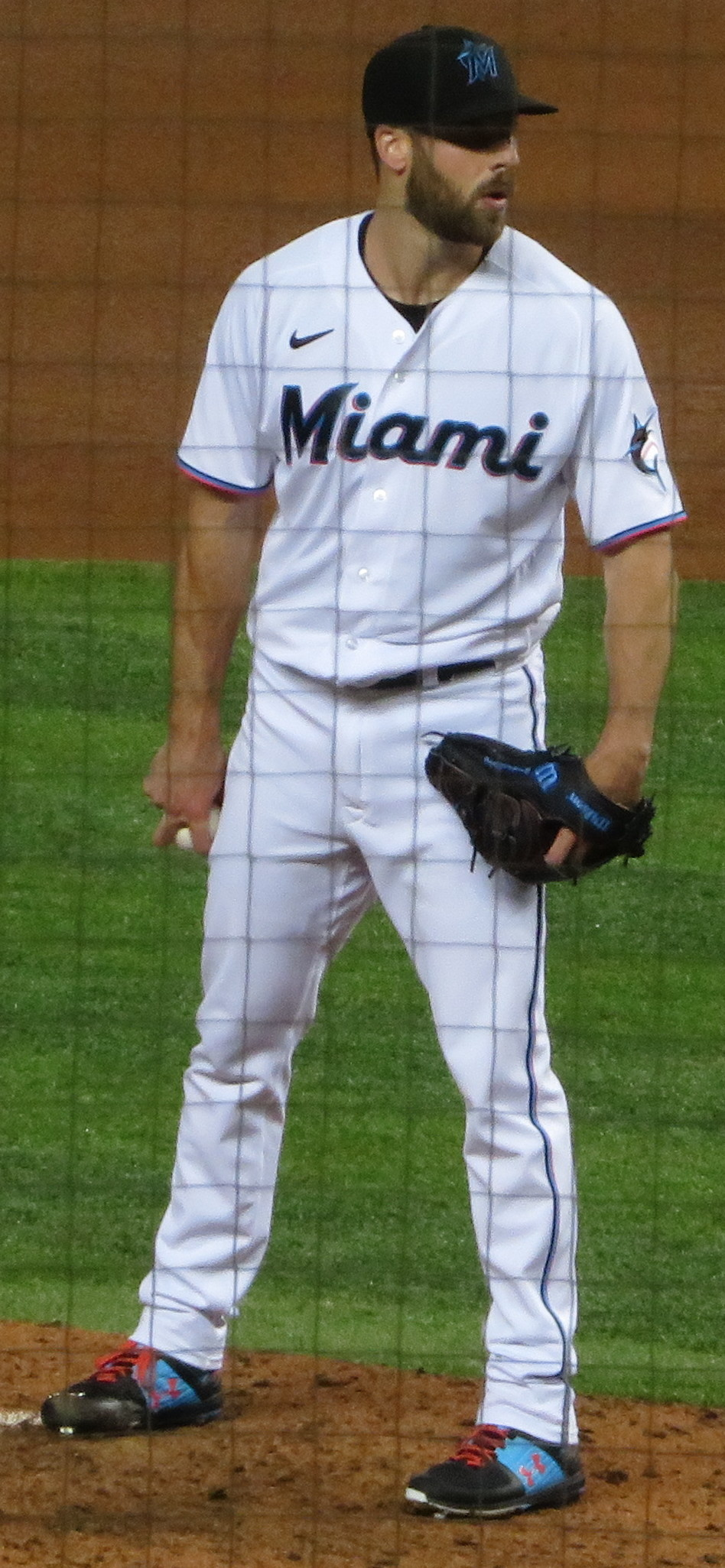
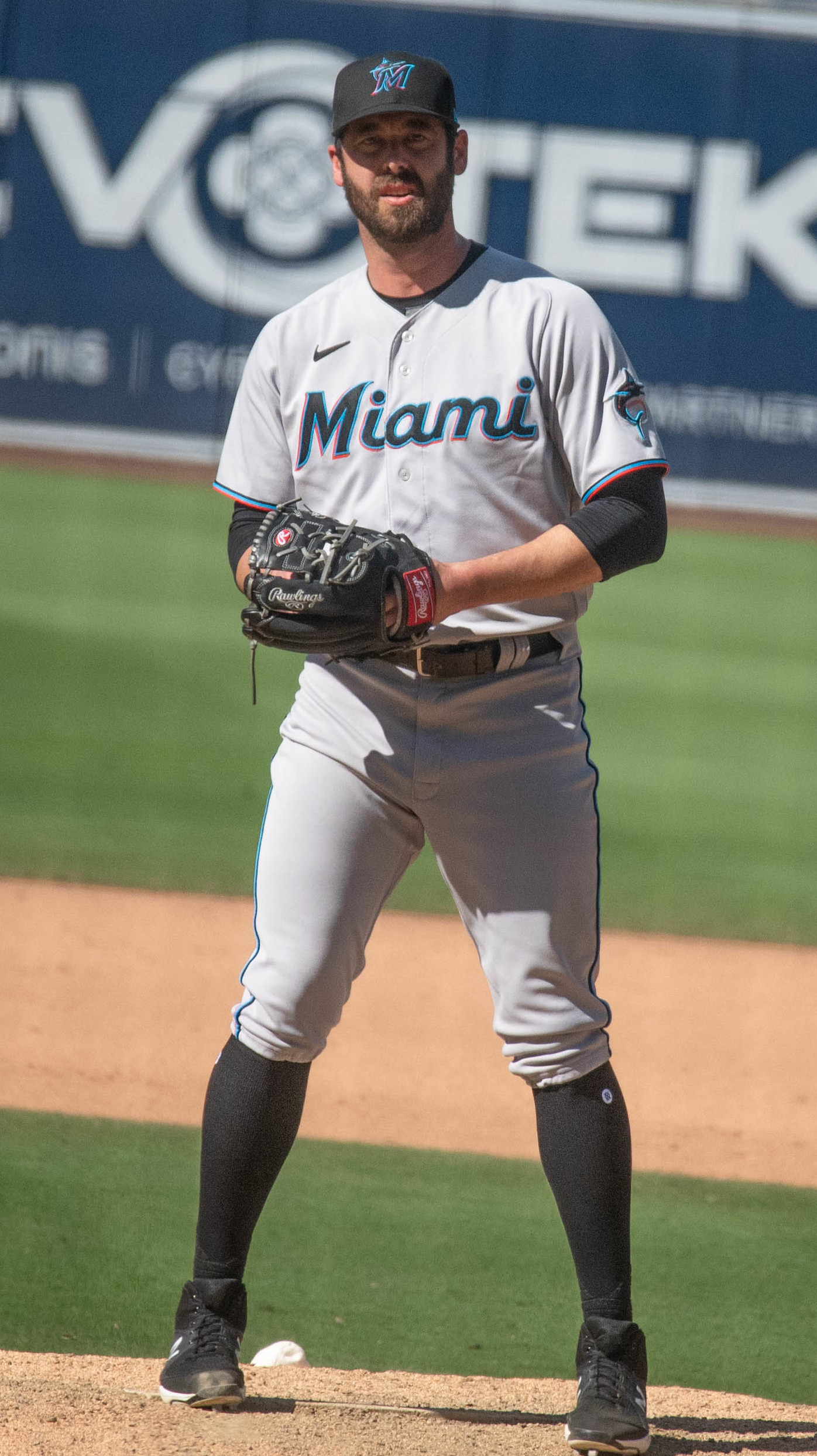
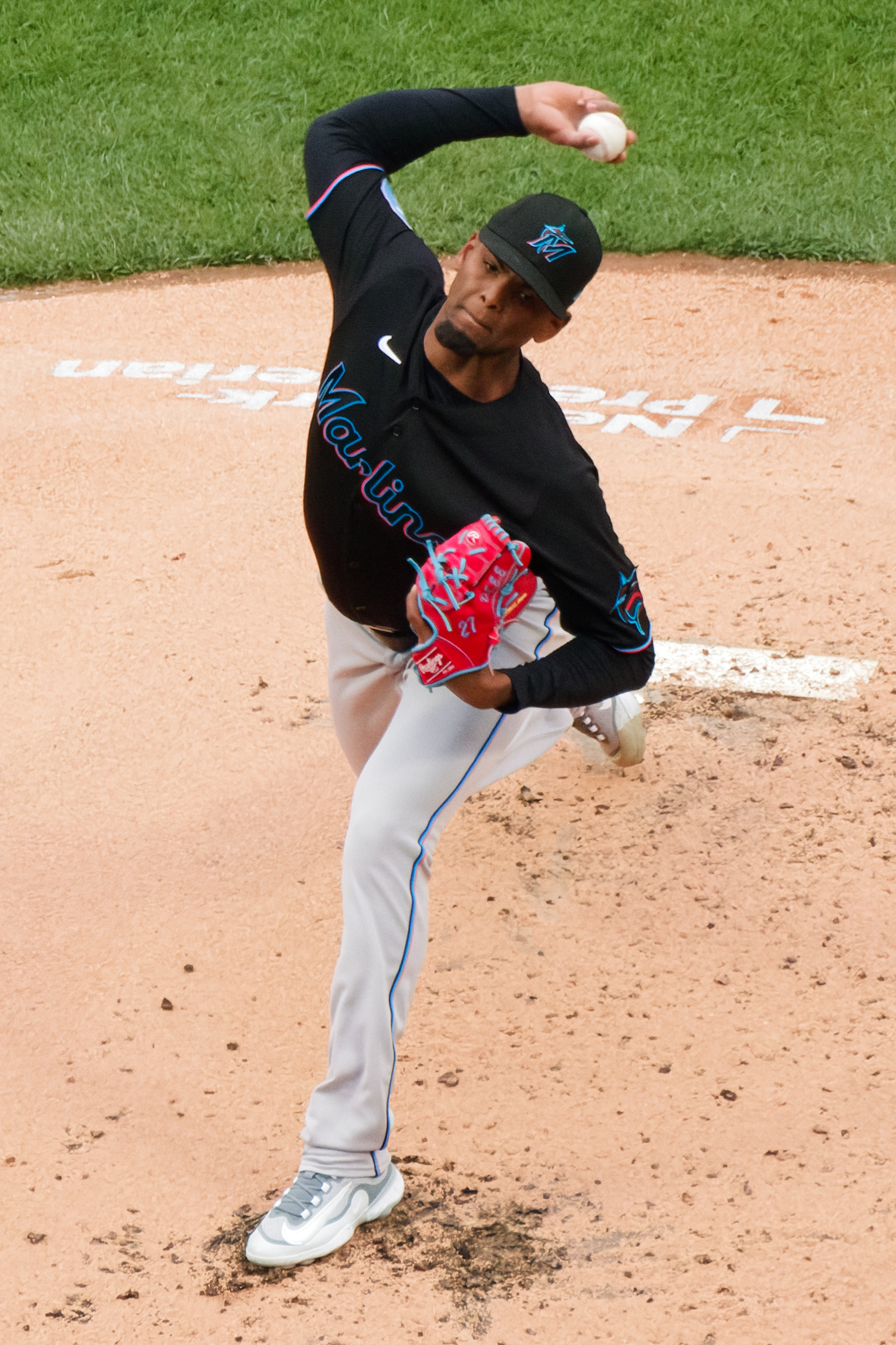
Anthony Bass (left) in the home uniform; Dylan Floro (middle) in the road uniform; Edward Cabrera (right) in the 2019–2023 black alternate uniform

== Rivalry ==
=== Citrus Series ===
The Rays also have a geographical, interleague rivalry with the Miami Marlins. Tampa Bay currently leads the series, 81–60.

== World Series championships ==
The Marlins won the World Series in 1997 and 2003, but both titles were followed by controversial periods where the team sold off all the high-priced players and rebuilt. Between 2003 and 2019, the team's two World Series runs also marked their sole postseason appearances. Their three playoff qualifications and seven winning seasons are the fewest among MLB franchises.

Despite never winning a division title, the Florida Marlins are the only team to make the playoffs and win a World Series in its first two winning seasons.

Season	Manager	Opponent	Series Score	Record
1997	Jim Leyland	Cleveland Indians	4–3	92–70
2003	Jack McKeon	New York Yankees	4–2	91–71
Total World Series championships:				2

== Roster ==
Miami Marlins 2027 spring training roster
40-man roster		Non-roster invitees	Coaches / other
Pitchers: 22 Sandy Alcántara; 37 Anthony Bender; -- Brandan Bidois; 31 Bradley Blalock; 62 Zach Brzykcy; 95 Josh Ekness; 29 Pete Fairbanks; 53 Calvin Faucher; 90 Dax Fulton; 58 Cade Gibson; 67 Wikelman González; 65 Ryan Gusto; 26 Janson Junk; 23 Max Meyer; 44 Patrick Monteverde; 39 Eury Pérez; 49 Michael Petersen; 30 Tyler Phillips; 79 Jack Ralston; 38 Victor Vodnik; 59 Josh White; 55 Tyler Zuber	Catchers: 33 Logan Driscoll; 80 Joe Mack; 64 Brian Navarreto; Infielders: 24 Maximo Acosta; 63 Deyvison De Los Santos; 9 Xavier Edwards; 6 Otto Lopez; 21 Graham Pauley; 8 Javier Sanoja; 68 Jared Serna; 28 Kyle Stowers; Outfielders: 17 Owen Caissie; 18 Griffin Conine; 13 Heriberto Hernández; 87 Jakob Marsee; 3 Esteury Ruiz; Designated hitters: 50 Agustín Ramírez		Manager: 86 Clayton McCullough; Coaches: 48 Blake Butler (infield); 82 Corbin Day (assistant hitting); 81 Craig Driver (first base / catching instructor); 97 Tanner Garrison (bullpen catcher); 85 Pedro Guerrero (hitting); 70 Chris Hess (assistant hitting); 45 Blake Lalli (third base); 72 Aaron Leanhardt (field coordinator); 56 Rob Marcello (assistant pitching); 52 Brandon Mann (bullpen / pitching strategist); 57 Daniel Moskos (pitching); -- Bryson Nakamura (performance); 25 Carson Vitale (bench); 98 Harry Wilonsky (bullpen catcher); 60-day injured list: 32 Ronny Henriquez; 71 William Kempner; 60 Adam Mazur; 43 Andrew Nardi; 61 Robby Snelling; 39 active, 0 inactive, 0 non-roster invitees; 7-, 10-, or 15-day injured list; * Not on active roster; ^{†} Suspended list; Roster, coaches, and NRIs updated September 29, 2026; Transactions • Depth chart; → All MLB rosters

== Opening Day lineups ==
Year	1	2	3	4	5	6	7	8	9
2026	Austin Slater RF	Agustín Ramírez C	Jakob Marsee CF	Otto Lopez SS	Connor Norby 1B	Heriberto Hernández LF	Xavier Edwards 2B	Owen Caissie DH	Javier Sanoja 3B
2025	Xavier Edwards SS	Kyle Stowers LF	Jonah Bride DH	Matt Mervis 1B	Otto Lopez 2B	Griffin Conine RF	Derek Hill CF	Graham Pauley 3B	Nick Fortes C
2024	Luis Arráez 2B	Josh Bell 1B	Bryan De La Cruz DH	Jazz Chisholm Jr. CF	Jake Burger 3B	Jesús Sánchez RF	Tim Anderson SS	Nick Gordon LF	Nick Fortes C
2023	Luis Arráez 2B	Jean Segura 3B	Garrett Cooper 1B	Jazz Chisholm Jr. CF	Jorge Soler DH	Avisaíl García RF	Bryan De La Cruz LF	Jacob Stallings C	Joey Wendle SS
2022	Jorge Soler LF	Garrett Cooper 1B	Jesús Sánchez CF	Jesús Aguilar DH	Avisaíl García RF	Joey Wendle 3B	Miguel Rojas SS	Jacob Stallings C	Jazz Chisholm Jr. 2B
2021	Corey Dickerson LF	Starling Marte CF	Jesús Aguilar 1B	Adam Duvall RF	Brian Anderson 3B	Jazz Chisholm Jr. 2B	Jorge Alfaro C	Miguel Rojas SS	Sandy Alcántara P
2020	Jonathan Villar CF	Jesús Aguilar 1B	Corey Dickerson LF	Harold Ramírez RF	Brian Anderson 3B	Garrett Cooper DH	Isan Díaz 2B	Francisco Cervelli C	Miguel Rojas SS
2019	Lewis Brinson CF	Brian Anderson 3B	Starlin Castro 2B	Garrett Cooper RF	Martín Prado 1B	Jorge Alfaro C	Miguel Rojas SS	Rosell Herrera LF	José Ureña P
Year	1	2	3	4	5	6	7	8	9
2018	Lewis Brinson CF	Derek Dietrich LF	Starlin Castro 2B	Justin Bour 1B	Brian Anderson 3B	Garrett Cooper RF	Miguel Rojas SS	Chad Wallach C	José Ureña P
2017	Dee Gordon 2B	J. T. Realmuto C	Christian Yelich CF	Giancarlo Stanton RF	Justin Bour 1B	Marcell Ozuna LF	Derek Dietrich 3B	Adeiny Hechavarria SS	Edinson Vólquez P
2016	Dee Gordon 2B	Marcell Ozuna CF	Christian Yelich LF	Giancarlo Stanton RF	Martín Prado 3B	Justin Bour 1B	J. T. Realmuto C	Adeiny Hechavarria SS	Wei-Yin Chen P
2015	Dee Gordon 2B	Christian Yelich LF	Giancarlo Stanton RF	Michael Morse 1B	Martín Prado 3B	Marcell Ozuna CF	Jarrod Saltalamacchia C	Adeiny Hechavarria SS	Henderson Álvarez P
2014	Christian Yelich LF	Jeff Baker 2B	Giancarlo Stanton RF	Casey McGehee 3B	Garrett Jones 1B	Jarrod Saltalamacchia C	Marcell Ozuna CF	Adeiny Hechavarria SS	José Fernández P
2013	Juan Pierre LF	Chris Coghlan CF	Giancarlo Stanton RF	Plácido Polanco 3B	Rob Brantly C	Donovan Solano 2B	Casey Kotchman 1B	Adeiny Hechavarria SS	Ricky Nolasco P
2012	Jose Reyes SS	Emilio Bonifacio CF	Hanley Ramírez 3B	Giancarlo Stanton RF	Logan Morrison LF	Gaby Sánchez 1B	Omar Infante 2B	John Buck C	Josh Johnson P
Year	1	2	3	4	5	6	7	8	9
2011	Chris Coghlan CF	Omar Infante 2B	Hanley Ramírez SS	Giancarlo Stanton RF	Gaby Sánchez 1B	Logan Morrison LF	John Buck C	Donnie Murphy 3B	Josh Johnson P
2010	Chris Coghlan LF	Cameron Maybin CF	Hanley Ramírez SS	Jorge Cantú 3B	Dan Uggla 2B	Ronny Paulino C	Cody Ross RF	Gaby Sánchez 1B	Josh Johnson P
2009	Emilio Bonifacio 3B	John Baker C	Hanley Ramírez SS	Jorge Cantú 1B	Dan Uggla 2B	Jeremy Hermida LF	Cody Ross RF	Cameron Maybin CF	Ricky Nolasco P
2008	Hanley Ramírez SS	Dan Uggla 2B	Mike Jacobs 1B	Josh Willingham LF	Jorge Cantú 3B	Cody Ross CF	Luis Gonzalez RF	Matt Treanor C	Mark Hendrickson P
2007	Hanley Ramírez SS	Dan Uggla 2B	Miguel Cabrera 3B	Mike Jacobs 1B	Josh Willingham LF	Joe Borchard RF	Miguel Olivo C	Alejandro De Aza CF	Dontrelle Willis P
2006	Hanley Ramírez SS	Jeremy Hermida RF	Miguel Cabrera 3B	Mike Jacobs 1B	Josh Willingham LF	Dan Uggla 2B	Miguel Olivo C	Eric Reed CF	Dontrelle Willis P
2005	Juan Pierre CF	Luis Castillo 2B	Miguel Cabrera LF	Carlos Delgado 1B	Mike Lowell 3B	Paul Lo Duca C	Juan Encarnación RF	Álex González SS	Josh Beckett P
2004	Juan Pierre CF	Luis Castillo 2B	Miguel Cabrera RF	Mike Lowell 3B	Jeff Conine LF	Hee-Seop Choi 1B	Ramón Castro C	Alex González SS	Josh Beckett P
2003	Luis Castillo 2B	Juan Pierre CF	Iván Rodríguez C	Derrek Lee 1B	Mike Lowell 3B	Juan Encarnación RF	Todd Hollandsworth LF	Alex González SS	Josh Beckett P
2002	Luis Castillo 2B	Preston Wilson CF	Cliff Floyd LF	Kevin Millar RF	Mike Lowell 3B	Derrek Lee 1B	Alex González SS	Mike Redmond C	Ryan Dempster P
2001	Luis Castillo 2B	Eric Owens RF	Cliff Floyd LF	Preston Wilson CF	Mike Lowell 3B	Charles Johnson C	Derrek Lee 1B	Alex González SS	Ryan Dempster P
2000	Luis Castillo 2B	Alex González SS	Cliff Floyd LF	Preston Wilson CF	Mike Lowell 3B	Kevin Millar 1B	Brant Brown RF	Mike Redmond C	Alex Fernandez P
1999	Luis Castillo 2B	Alex González SS	Mark Kotsay CF	Derrek Lee 1B	Todd Dunwoody CF	Preston Wilson LF	Kevin Orie 3B	Mike Redmond C	Alex Fernandez P
1998	Cliff Floyd LF	Édgar Rentería SS	Ryan Jackson 1B	Gary Sheffield RF	Mark Kotsay CF	Charles Johnson C	Craig Counsell 2B	Josh Booty 3B	Liván Hernández P
1997	Luis Castillo 2B	Édgar Rentería SS	Gary Sheffield RF	Bobby Bonilla 3B	Moisés Alou LF	Devon White CF	Jeff Conine 1B	Charles Johnson C	Kevin Brown P
1996	Quilvio Veras 2B	Devon White CF	Gary Sheffield RF	Jeff Conine LF	Terry Pendleton 3B	Greg Colbrunn 1B	Charles Johnson C	Kurt Abbott SS	Kevin Brown P
1995	Quilvio Veras 2B	Alex Arias SS	Gary Sheffield RF	Jeff Conine LF	Terry Pendleton 3B	Greg Colbrunn 1B	Charles Johnson C	Chuck Carr CF	John Burkett P
1994	Chuck Carr CF	Jerry Browne 3B	Gary Sheffield RF	Orestes Destrade 1B	Jeff Conine LF	Bret Barberie 2B	Benito Santiago C	Kurt Abbott SS	Charlie Hough P
1993	Scott Pose CF	Bret Barberie 2B	Junior Felix RF	Orestes Destrade 1B	Dave Magadan 3B	Benito Santiago C	Jeff Conine LF	Walt Weiss SS	Charlie Hough P

== Achievements ==
=== Awards ===
- No-Hitters: Marlins pitchers have pitched six no-hitters in team regular-season history, five coming against teams in the NL West and one against a team from the American League (AL).

Pitcher	Date	Team	Result	Site
Al Leiter	May 11, 1996	Rockies	11–0	Pro Player Stadium
Kevin Brown	June 10, 1997	Giants	9–0	Candlestick Park
A. J. Burnett	May 12, 2001	Padres	3–0	Qualcomm Stadium
Aníbal Sánchez	September 6, 2006	Diamondbacks	2–0	Dolphin Stadium
Henderson Álvarez	September 29, 2013	Tigers	1–0	Marlins Park
Edinson Vólquez	June 3, 2017	Diamondbacks	3–0	Marlins Park

- Hitting for the cycle: Two Marlins players have hit for the cycle.

Player	Date	Opponent	Site
Luis Arráez	April 11, 2023	Phillies	Citizens Bank Park
Xavier Edwards	July 28, 2024	Brewers	American Family Field

=== Retired numbers ===
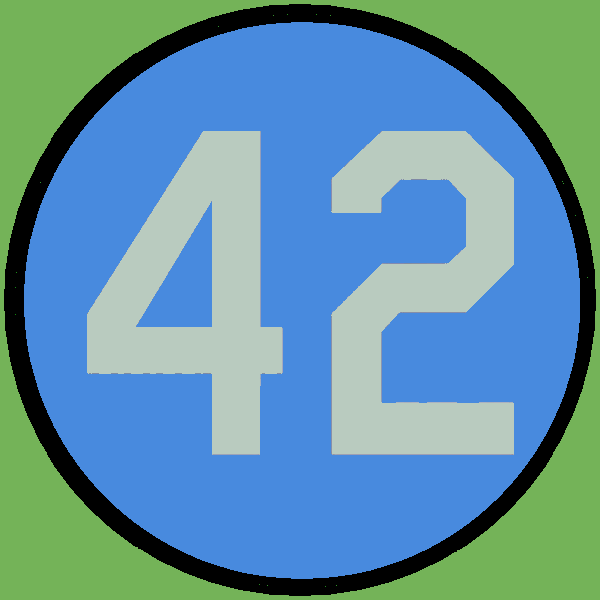
Jackie
Robinson
All MLB
Honored April 15, 1997

From 1993 until 2011, the Marlins had retired the number 5 in honor of Carl Barger, the first president of the Florida Marlins, who had died prior to the team's inaugural season. Barger's favorite player was Joe DiMaggio, thus the selection of number 5. With the move to LoanDepot Park, the team opted to honor Barger with a plaque instead, and opened number 5 to circulation. Logan Morrison, a Kansas City native and fan of Royals Hall-of-Famer George Brett (who wore that number with the Royals), became the first Marlins player to wear the number. As of 2024, the Marlins are the only franchise with no retired numbers for former players, and while eight former players are in the Hall of Fame, none wear a Marlins cap on their plaque or have the Marlins listed as their primary team.

After José Fernández's death as a result of a boating accident on September 25, 2016, the Miami Marlins built a memorial at LoanDepot Park in his honor, which displays his number 16. Fernández's number has yet to be officially retired, but remains inactive.

=== Baseball Hall of Famers ===
Miami Marlins Hall of Famers
Affiliation according to the National Baseball Hall of Fame and Museum
Florida Marlins

Andre Dawson

Trevor Hoffman
Jim Leyland

Mike Piazza
Tim Raines

Iván Rodríguez

Miami Marlins

Ichiro Suzuki

- Players and managers listed in **bold** are depicted on their Hall of Fame plaques wearing a Marlins cap insignia.
- * Miami Marlins listed as primary team according to the Hall of Fame

=== Ford C. Frick Award recipients ===
Miami Marlins Ford C. Frick Award recipients
Affiliation according to the National Baseball Hall of Fame and Museum

**Felo Ramírez**

Dave Van Horne

- **Names in bold** received the award based primarily on their work as broadcasters for the Marlins.

=== Florida Sports Hall of Fame ===
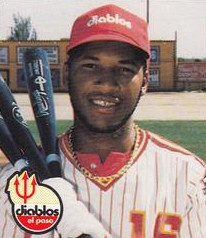
Gary Sheffield

Marlins in the Florida Sports Hall of Fame
No.	Name	Position	Tenure	Notes
—	Wayne Huizenga	Owner	1993–1998	
10	Gary Sheffield	OF/3B	1993–1998	Born in Tampa
18, 19	Jeff Conine	1B/LF	1993–1997; 2003–2005	Known as "Mr. Marlin" for his significant history with the club
30, 32	Tim Raines	LF	2002	Elected mainly on his performance with Montreal Expos, Born in Sanford
8	Andre Dawson	OF	1995-1996	Elected mainly on his performance with Montreal Expos, Born in Miami
22, 25	Al Leiter	P	1996–1997, 2005	

=== Marlins Legends Hall of Fame ===
On February 9, 2025, the Marlins announced its Legends Hall of Fame, which honors former players, coaches, managers and staff members who made significant achievements and contributions to the organization and South Florida community. The 2025 inaugural Hall of Fame class features four members, each of whom will be inducted during certain points of the season.

Jeff Conine was the first to have an induction ceremony on March 30, 2025.

Key
Year	Year inducted
**Bold**	Member of the Baseball Hall of Fame
†	Member of the Baseball Hall of Fame as a Marlin
**Bold**	Recipient of the Hall of Fame's Ford C. Frick Award

Marlins Legends Hall of Fame
Year	No.	Name	Position	Tenure	Date
2025	34, 1	Luis Castillo	2B	1996–2005	August 24, 2025
2025	18, 19	Jeff Conine	1B/LF	1993–1997; 2003–2005	March 30, 2025
2025	10	**Jim Leyland**	MGR	1997–1998	July 6, 2025
2025	15, 25	Jack McKeon	MGR	2003–2005; 2011	August 3, 2025
2026	61, 21	Josh Beckett	P	2001–2005	September 6, 2026
2026	35	Dontrelle Willis	P	2003–2007	September 13, 2026

== Minor league affiliations ==
The Miami Marlins farm system consists of seven minor league affiliates.

Class	Team	League	Location	Ballpark	Affiliated
Triple-A	Jacksonville Jumbo Shrimp	International League	Jacksonville, Florida	VyStar Ballpark	2009
Double-A	Pensacola Blue Wahoos	Southern League	Pensacola, Florida	Blue Wahoos Stadium	2021
High-A	Beloit Sky Carp	Midwest League	Beloit, Wisconsin	ABC Supply Stadium	2021
Single-A	Jupiter Hammerheads	Florida State League	Jupiter, Florida	Roger Dean Chevrolet Stadium	2002
Rookie	FCL Marlins	Florida Complex League	Jupiter, Florida	Roger Dean Chevrolet Stadium	1992
Rookie	DSL Marlins	Dominican Summer League	Boca Chica, Santo Domingo	Academia de Prospecto Complex	1993
Rookie	DSL Miami	Dominican Summer League	Boca Chica, Santo Domingo	Academia de Prospecto Complex	2022

== Radio and television ==
The Marlins' flagship radio station from their inception in 1993 through 2007 was WQAM 560 AM. Although the Marlins had plans to leave WQAM after 2006, they remained with WQAM for the 2007 season. On October 11, 2007, the Marlins announced an agreement with WAXY 790 AM to broadcast all games for the 2008 season. Longtime Montreal Expo and Marlins play-by-play radio announcer Dave Van Horne won the Hall of Fame's Ford C. Frick Award for excellence in baseball broadcasting in 2010. As of 2026, the Marlins radio broadcasts are called by Jack McMullen on play-by-play, with Rod Allen and A. J. Ramos splitting duties as color analysts.

Games are also broadcast in Spanish on Radio Mambi 710 AM. Felo Ramírez called play-by-play on that station from 1993 to 2017 along with Luis Quintana. Ramirez won the Ford C. Frick Award from the National Baseball Hall of Fame in 2001.

Until 2025, Marlins games were televised by FanDuel Sports Network Florida. On January 8, 2026, the team terminated its contract with the parent company of FanDuel Sports Network, Main Street Sports Group, after a missed partial rights payment was not delivered on January 1, 2026. The Miami Marlins are expected to air under a different manner for the 2026 season. The options are via local television station Channel 39 WSFL, MLB Network, or the MLB Network with select simulcast transmission to local stations.

Marlins games on Marlins.TV are called by Kyle Sielaff on play-by-play with Tommy Hutton, Gaby Sánchez and Jeff Nelson on color commentary.

== Culture ==
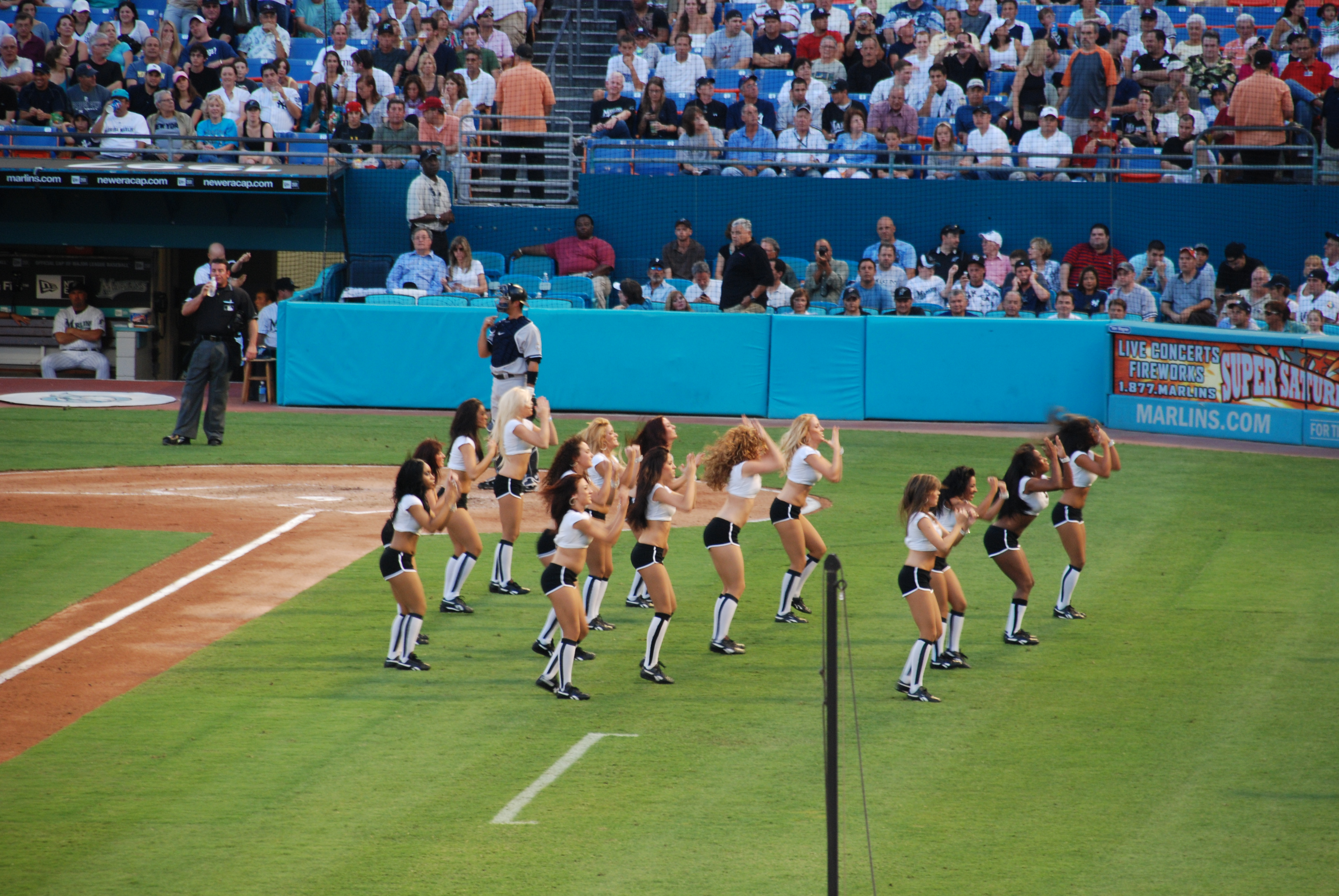
Marlins Mermaids on June 19, 2009

In 1989, Back to the Future Part II had a reference to the Chicago Cubs defeating a baseball team from Miami in the 2015 World Series, ending the longest championship drought in all four of the major North American professional sports leagues. In actuality, the Cubs were swept in four games by the New York Mets in the NLCS, the Marlins failed to make the postseason, and the 2015 World Series was between the Kansas City Royals and the New York Mets, with the Royals winning in five games. Also, both the Cubs and Marlins are part of the National League, rendering a World Series matchup between the two teams impossible.

The Marlins were the first team in Major League Baseball to have a dance/cheer team. Debuting in 2003, the "Marlins Mermaids" influenced other MLB teams to develop their own cheer/dance squads. In 2008, the Florida Marlins debuted "The Marlins Manatees", Major League Baseball's first all-male dance/energy squad, to star alongside the Mermaids. As of 2012, the Marlins have abandoned the "Mermaids" and "Manatees" for in-game entertainment instead using an "energy squad", a co-ed group of dancers. In 2019, the Marlins brought back the Mermaids for the first time since 2012.

The Marlins have had many official anthems over the years, performed by such artists as Pitbull, DJ Khaled, Poo Bear and Creed frontman Scott Stapp. Stapp penned their 2010 anthem "Marlins Will Soar".

On July 16, 2022, the Marlins became the second NL team to form a cheering section for fans when it opened "Sandy's Beach" at Section 22 of LoanDepot Park for supporters of team starter Sandy Alcantara. Fans assigned to this section, located near the 3rd base line, wear beach related clothing in a nod to the city's famous beaches whenever Sandy pitches on select game days.

== Finishes ==
=== Best finishes in franchise history ===
The following are the five best seasons in Marlins history:

MLB season	Team season	Regular season					Postseason	Awards
MLB season	Team season	Finish^{[a]}	Wins^{[b]}	Losses	Win%	GB^{[c]}	Postseason	Awards
1997	1997	2nd	92	70	.568	9	Wild card winner, World Series Champions,	Liván Hernández (World Series MVP)
2003	2003	2nd	91	71	.562	10	Wild card winner, World Series Champions	Jack McKeon (MOY); Dontrelle Willis (ROY); Mike Lowell (Silver Slugger); Josh Beckett (World Series MVP)
2009	2009	2nd	87	75	.537	6		Hanley Ramírez (Silver Slugger/NL Batting Title); Chris Coghlan (NL Rookie of The Year)
2008	2008	3rd	84	77	.522	7 1/2		Hanley Ramírez (Silver Slugger)
2023	2023	3rd	84	78	.519	20	Wild card winner, 2023 NLWCS	Skip Schumaker (NL Manager of the Year)

=== Worst finishes in franchise history ===
The following are the five worst seasons in Marlins' history:

MLB season	Team season	Regular season					Notes	
MLB season	Team season	Finish^{[a]}	Wins^{[b]}	Losses	Win%	GB^{[c]}	Notes	Awards and Honors
1998	1998	5th	54	108	.333	52	Worst Record in MLB History for defending WS Champion	
2019	2019	5th	57	105	.352	40	Second season under Jeter- Sherman group ownership	
2013	2013	5th	62	100	.383	34	First season under manager Mike Redmond	
2024	2024	5th	62	100	.383	33	Final season under manager Skip Schumaker	
1999	1999	5th	64	98	.395	39		

== Home attendance ==
Other than their first few years as a franchise in the 1990s, the Marlins have consistently ranked as one of the lowest attendance teams in the league, coming in last place (30th) several of the past 20 years. Even when LoanDepot Park was completed for the 2012 season, attendance was only average for the first year, dropping down to second to last by 2013.

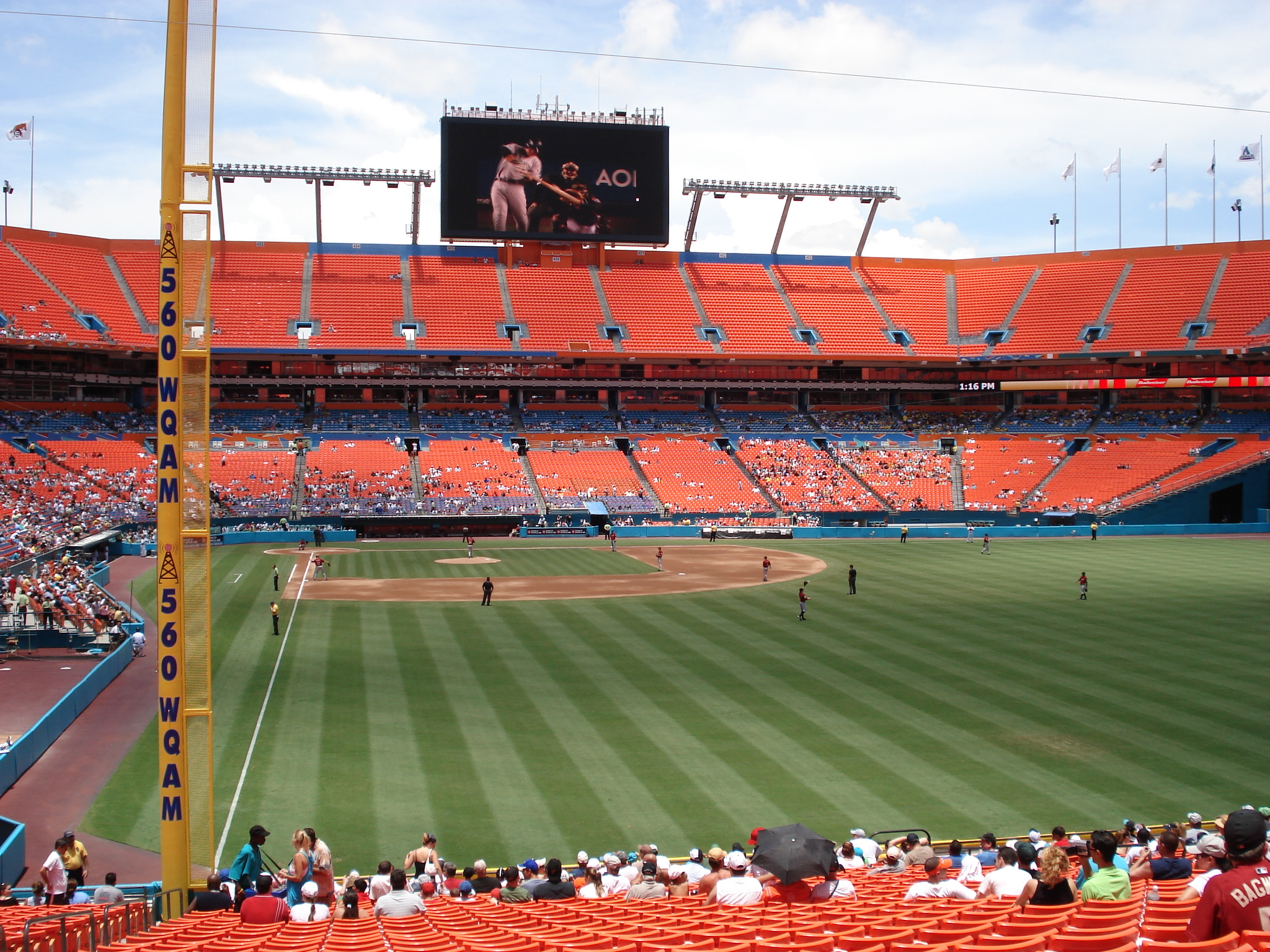
The Marlins' former home at what was then Dolphin Stadium was primarily a football stadium (1993–2011)

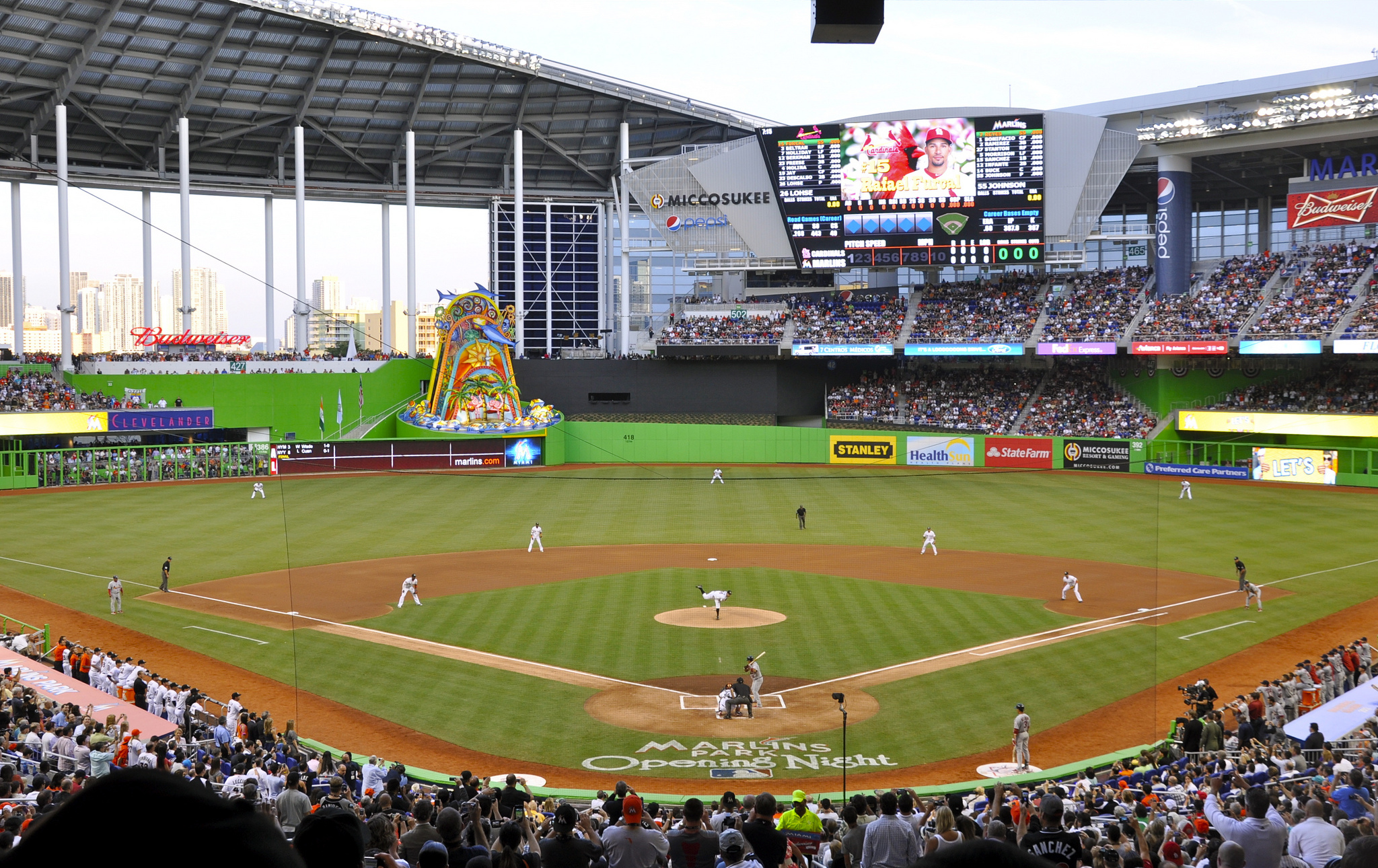
First pitch at LoanDepot Park, home of the Miami Marlins, which held its first Major League game on April 4, 2012, between the Marlins and the St. Louis Cardinals.

Home Attendance at Hard Rock Stadium
Year	Total Attendance	Game Average	League Rank
1993	3,064,847	37,838	7th
1994	1,937,467	33,695	9th
1995	1,700,466	23,950	13th
1996	1,746,767	21,565	18th
1997	2,364,387	29,190	11th
1998	1,730,384	21,363	22nd
1999	1,369,421	16,906	28th
2000	1,218,326	15,041	15th
2001	1,261,226	15,765	29th
2002	813,118	10,038	29th
2003	1,303,215	16,089	28th
2004	1,723,105	21,539	26th
2005	1,852,608	22,871	28th
2006	1,164,134	14,372	30th
2007	1,370,511	16,919	30th
2008	1,335,076	16,482	30th
2009	1,464,109	18,075	29th
2010	1,524,894	18,826	28th
2011	1,520,562	19,007	29th

Home Attendance at LoanDepot Park
Year	Total Attendance	Game Average	League Rank
2012	2,219,444	27,401	18th
2013	1,586,322	19,584	29th
2014	1,732,283	21,386	27th
2015	1,752,235	21,632	28th
2016	1,712,417	21,405	27th
2017	1,583,014	20,295	28th
2018	811,104	10,014	30th
2019	811,302	10,016	30th
2020	No home attendance due to the COVID-19 pandemic		
2021	642,617 (Note: Attendance limited due to the COVID-19 pandemic)	7,933	30th
2022	907,487	11,203	29th
2023	1,162,819	14,355	29th
2024	1,087,453	13,425	29th

== Finance ==
=== Opening Day salaries ===
Opening Day payrolls for 25-man roster (since 1993):

Opening Day Salary
Year	Salary	Major League Rank
1993	$18,196,545	25th (of 28)
1994	$20,275,500	25th
1995	$23,670,000	25th
1996	$30,079,500	15th
1997	$47,753,000	7th
1998	$41,864,667	20th (of 30)
1999	$32,360,000	28th
2000	$19,900,000	29th
2001	$35,762,500	26th
2002	$41,979,917	25th
2003	$45,050,000	25th
2004	$42,143,042	25th
2005	$60,408,834	19th
2006	$14,998,500	30th
2007	$30,507,000	29th
2008	$21,811,500	30th
2009	$36,834,000	30th
2010	$47,429,719	26th
2011	$57,695,000	24th
2012	$118,078,000	7th
2013	$39,621,900	29th
2014	$46,440,400	29th
2015	$67,479,000	30th
2016	$84,637,500	26th
2017	$115,406,101	20th
2018	$99,510,143	23rd
2019	$71,903,319	29th
2020	$41,560,815	27th
2021	$56,931,750	28th

=== Annual financial records ===
The annual financial records of the Marlins according to Forbes since 2001.

Annual Snapshot of Miami Marlins finance
Year	Franchise Value (millions)	Revenue (millions)	Operating Income (millions)	Player Expenses (millions)	Wins-to-player cost ratio
2001	$128	$67	$7	$34	161
2002	$137	$81	$1	$46	137
2003	$136	$76	$ −14	$53	134
2004	$172	$101	$ −12	$66	162
2005	$206	$103	$3	$58	131
2006	$226	$119	$ −12	$91	91
2007	$244	$122	$43	$31	255
2008	$256	$128	$36	$44	182
2009	$277	$139	$44	$45	227
2010	$317	$144	$46	$48	219
2011	$360	$143	$20.2	$58	167

== Notes ==
Awards and achievements
Preceded by New York Yankees; 1996	World Series champions Florida Marlins; 1997	Succeeded by New York Yankees; 1998–2000
Preceded by Anaheim Angels; 2002	World Series champions Florida Marlins; 2003	Succeeded by Boston Red Sox; 2004
Preceded by Atlanta Braves; 1996	National League champions Florida Marlins; 1997	Succeeded by San Diego Padres; 1998
Preceded by San Francisco Giants; 2002	National League champions Florida Marlins; 2003	Succeeded by St. Louis Cardinals; 2004
