= Jacob deGrom =

American baseball player (born 1988)

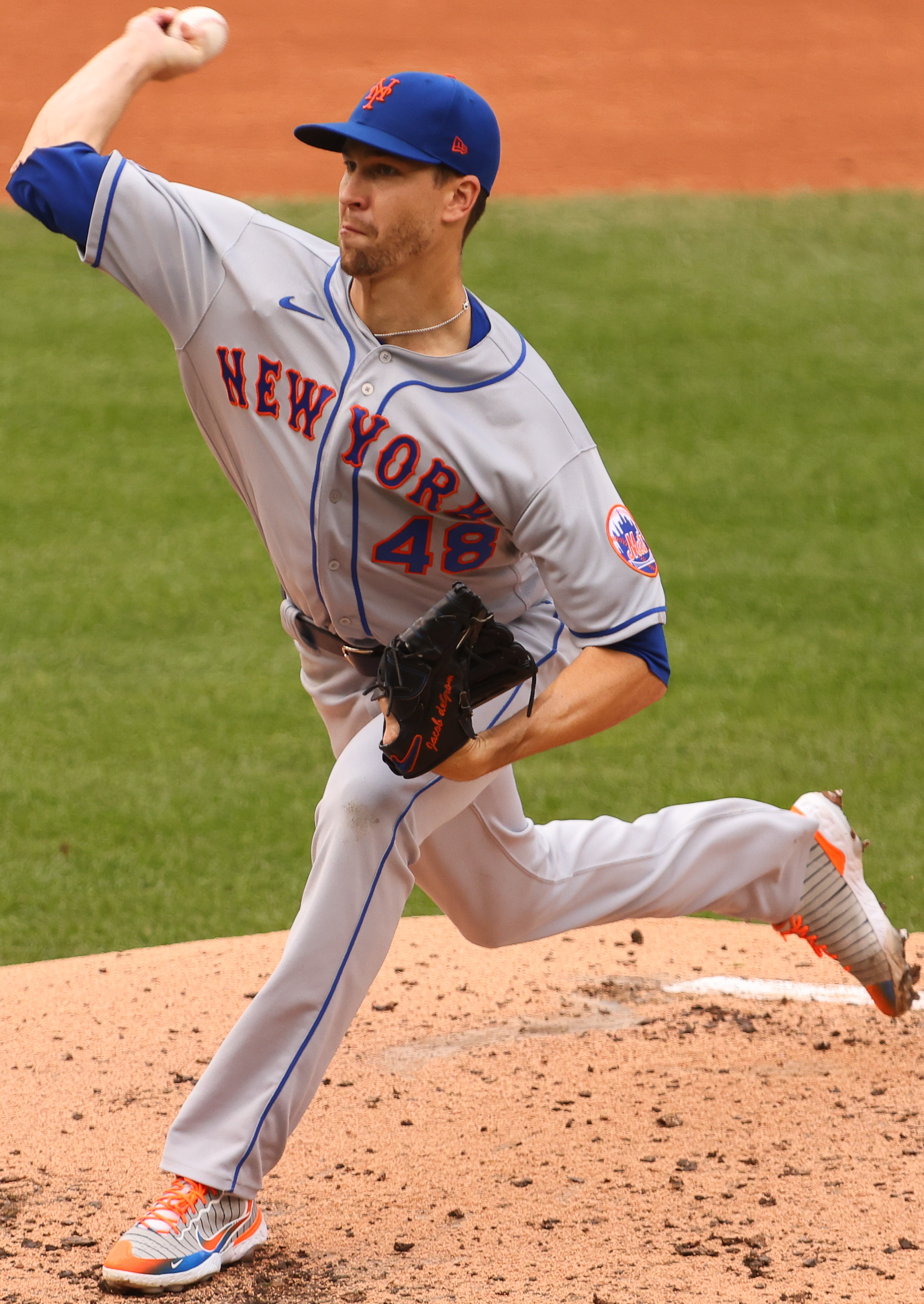
- DeGrom with the New York Mets in 2020

Texas Rangers – No. 48
- Pitcher
- Born: June 19, 1988 (age 38); DeLand, Florida, U.S.
- Bats: Left Throws: Right

MLB debut
- May 15, 2014, for the New York Mets

MLB statistics (through 2026 season)
- Win–loss record: 107–76
- Earned run average: 2.73
- Strikeouts: 2,052
- WHIP: 1.00
- Stats at Baseball Reference

Teams
- New York Mets (2014–2022); Texas Rangers (2023–present)

Career highlights and awards
- 5× All-Star (2015, 2018, 2019, 2021, 2025); 2× NL Cy Young Award (2018, 2019); 2× All-MLB First Team (2019, 2020); NL Rookie of the Year (2014); AL Comeback Player of the Year (2025); NL ERA leader (2018); 2× NL strikeout leader (2019, 2020)

Jacob Anthony deGrom (born June 19, 1988) is an American professional baseball pitcher for the Texas Rangers of Major League Baseball (MLB). He has previously played in MLB for the New York Mets.

DeGrom began playing baseball as a shortstop and was converted into a pitcher during his junior year at Stetson University. The Mets selected him in the ninth round of the 2010 MLB draft and he made his major league debut with them on May 15, 2014. That same year, deGrom was named the National League's (NL) Rookie of the Month twice, and the NL Rookie of the Year. In 2015, 2018, 2019, and 2021 deGrom was selected as an MLB All-Star. In 2018, deGrom was the NL leader in earned run average and won the Cy Young Award. In 2019, he led the NL in strikeouts and won the Cy Young Award for the second year in a row. In 2020, he again led the National League in strikeouts. DeGrom signed with the Rangers on a five-year deal in 2023 and was named an All-Star again in 2025.

As of the 2026 season, deGrom has the lowest career WHIP and the second lowest earned run average of any starting pitcher in the live-ball era (min. 1000 IP).

== Early life ==
Jacob Anthony deGrom was born on June 19, 1988, in DeLand, Florida, United States. DeGrom attended Calvary Christian Academy, a small school in Ormond Beach, Florida, where he played for the school's baseball and basketball teams. As a basketball player, he was voted the District 9 Class 1A player of the year by the Florida Athletic Coaches Association and selected to the all-state third team for Class 1A.

As a senior baseball player the Florida Sports Writers Association named deGrom to the All-Florida second team. He also played American Legion Baseball, where he was noticed by the coaches for the Stetson Hatters, the college baseball team of Stetson University.

== College career ==
After not being selected in the Major League Baseball draft out of high school, deGrom enrolled at Stetson and played for the Hatters. He was exclusively a shortstop during his freshman and sophomore seasons. Though he was considered a good fielder with a strong throwing arm, deGrom was a light hitter with a career .263 batting average. He made his first appearance as a pitcher in May 2009. In the summer of 2009, between his sophomore and junior years, deGrom pitched collegiate summer baseball for the DeLand Suns of the Florida Collegiate Summer League. He initially made 5 pitching appearances, allowing 0 earned runs and struck out 6 batters across 6.1 innings. However, his time with the Suns was interrupted due to a dispute as to what position he would play. "Well, then I’m not gonna play then if I don’t play shortstop," stated deGrom to the Suns' manager, Davey Johnson.

When deGrom returned to Stetson that fall, the team used him as a relief pitcher, filling the role of their closer, in addition to playing shortstop. He quickly became one of Stetson's best pitchers, so the team moved deGrom into their starting rotation midway through the season. In addition to a fastball, deGrom learned to throw a changeup and a slider. Major league scouts began to take notice of deGrom when he pitched against Chris Sale of Florida Gulf Coast University. In the game, deGrom hit his only home run of the season against Sale. He made 12 starts for the Hatters, pitching to a 4–5 win–loss record with a 4.48 earned run average (ERA).

== Professional career ==
=== Draft and minor leagues ===
The New York Mets selected deGrom in the ninth round as a pitcher, with the 272nd overall selection, of the 2010 Major League Baseball draft. He signed with the Mets, receiving a $95,000 signing bonus. The Mets assigned deGrom to the Kingsport Mets of the rookie-level Appalachian League where he made six starts before he was diagnosed with a partial tear of the ulnar collateral ligament (UCL) in his pitching elbow. He attempted to rehabilitate his arm for four months but underwent Tommy John surgery to repair the UCL in October. He did not pitch in 2011 while he recovered from the surgery. While rehabilitating, deGrom worked on his changeup with Johan Santana.

DeGrom pitched for the Savannah Sand Gnats of the Single–A South Atlantic League and the St. Lucie Mets of the High–A Florida State League in 2012, finishing the year with a 2.43 ERA in 19 games started. In 2013, he began the season with St. Lucie, but was promoted to the Binghamton Mets of the Double–A Eastern League after two starts due to injuries to Binghamton's Luis Mateo and Cory Mazzoni. He received a promotion to the Las Vegas 51s of the Triple–A Pacific Coast League in June after the Mets promoted Zack Wheeler and Carlos Torres to the major leagues and traded Collin McHugh. He had a combined 4.51 ERA for the season, due to a broken finger suffered during the offseason, which altered the way he threw the ball.

The Mets added deGrom to their 40-man roster on November 20, 2013, to protect him from being eligible in the Rule 5 draft. During the offseason, deGrom improved his mechanics, and learned to throw a curveball. He began the 2014 season with Las Vegas and had a 4–0 win–loss record and a 2.58 ERA in his first seven games started.

=== New York Mets (2014–2022) ===
==== 2014 ====
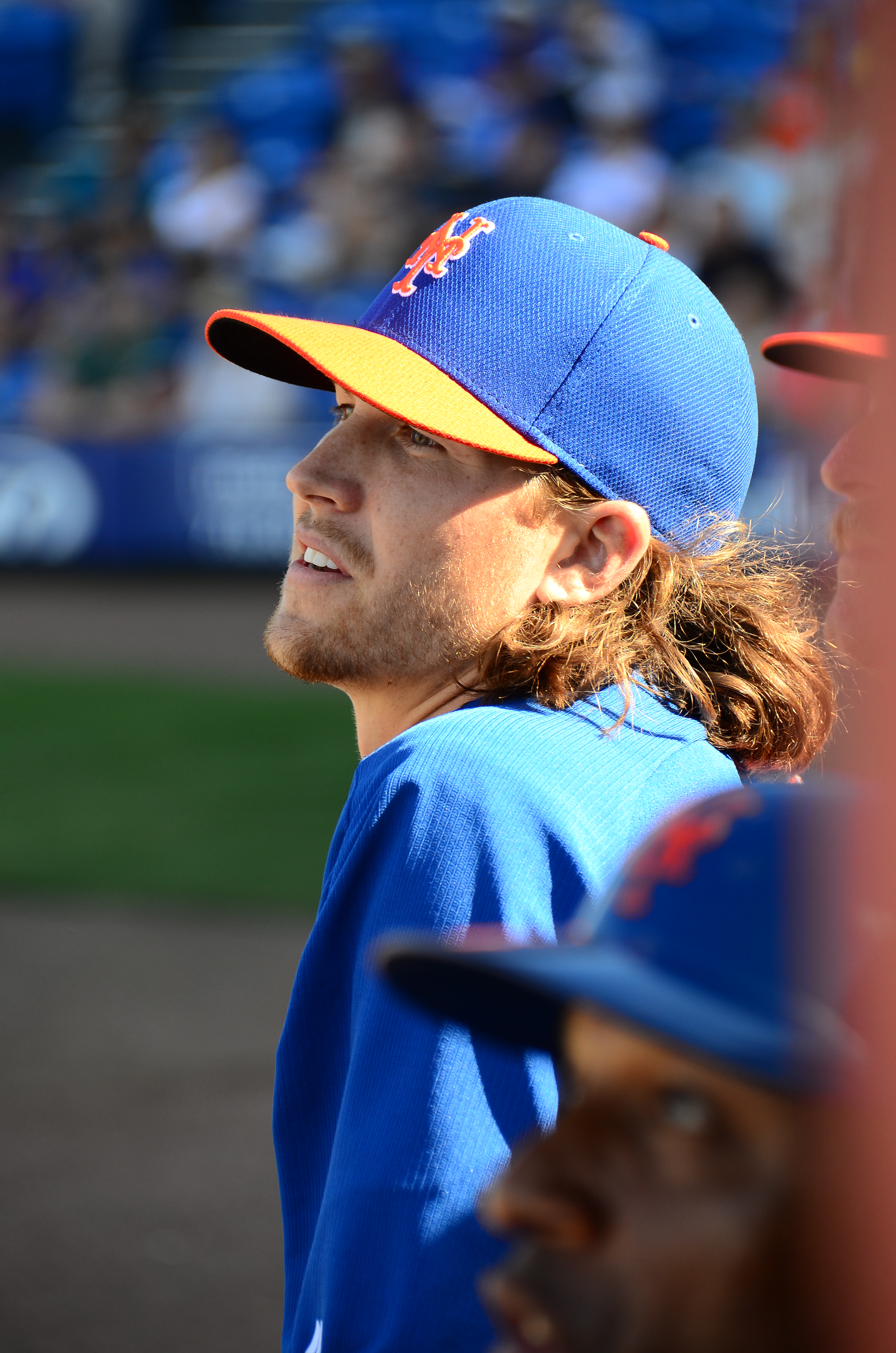
DeGrom with the Mets during spring training in 2014

The Mets promoted deGrom to the major leagues on May 12, 2014, after Gonzalez Germen was placed on the disabled list. The Mets planned to use deGrom in relief, but an injury to Dillon Gee required the Mets to insert him into their starting rotation. DeGrom made his major league debut on May 15 against their cross-town rival New York Yankees at Citi Field. He faced fellow rookie Chase Whitley, also making his major league debut. He pitched seven innings, allowing only one run and striking out six, but the Yankees shut out the Mets and won 1–0. DeGrom also collected his first major league hit in the game in his first career at-bat. It was the first hit by a Mets pitcher in the 2014 season ending an 0-for-64 hitless streak, the worst collective mark by a pitching staff to begin a season in major league history.

DeGrom compiled four quality starts in his first four major league starts, but did not record a win in any of them. On July 8, deGrom pitched seven scoreless innings and recorded 11 strikeouts in giving the Mets their 4,000th franchise victory. Along with Steve Cishek of the Miami Marlins, deGrom was named the National League's (NL) Co-Player of the Week for July 21 to 27 after allowing only one earned run in two starts that week. He was also named the NL Rookie of the Month for July. On August 11, deGrom was placed on the disabled list with rotator cuff tendinitis. Rafael Montero was called up on August 12 in deGrom's place. On August 23, Montero was re-sent back to the 51s to make room for deGrom coming off the disabled list.

On September 15, deGrom faced the Marlins and struck out his first eight batters, tying the major league record. Near the end of the season, deGrom was shut down for the year, ending his season with a 9–6 record, a 2.69 ERA, and 144 strikeouts. DeGrom collected a second Rookie of the Month award for his September performance, and, after the regular season ended, he was named the 2014 Sporting News Rookie of the Year by the Baseball Writers' Association of America, receiving first place votes on 26 of the 30 ballots. He was the first Met to receive the honor since Dwight Gooden in 1984.

==== 2015 ====
DeGrom and Clayton Kershaw of the Los Angeles Dodgers were selected as NL Co-Players of the Week for the week ending June 7, 2015. He began the 2015 season with an 8–6 win–loss record and a 2.30 ERA through the end of June, and was named to the NL roster in the 2015 MLB All-Star Game. During the All-Star Game, deGrom struck out the three batters he faced on ten pitches, becoming the first person to do so since pitch counts were recorded. DeGrom pitched to a 14–8 record with a 2.54 ERA and a 0.99 walks plus hits per inning pitched ratio during the 2015 season.

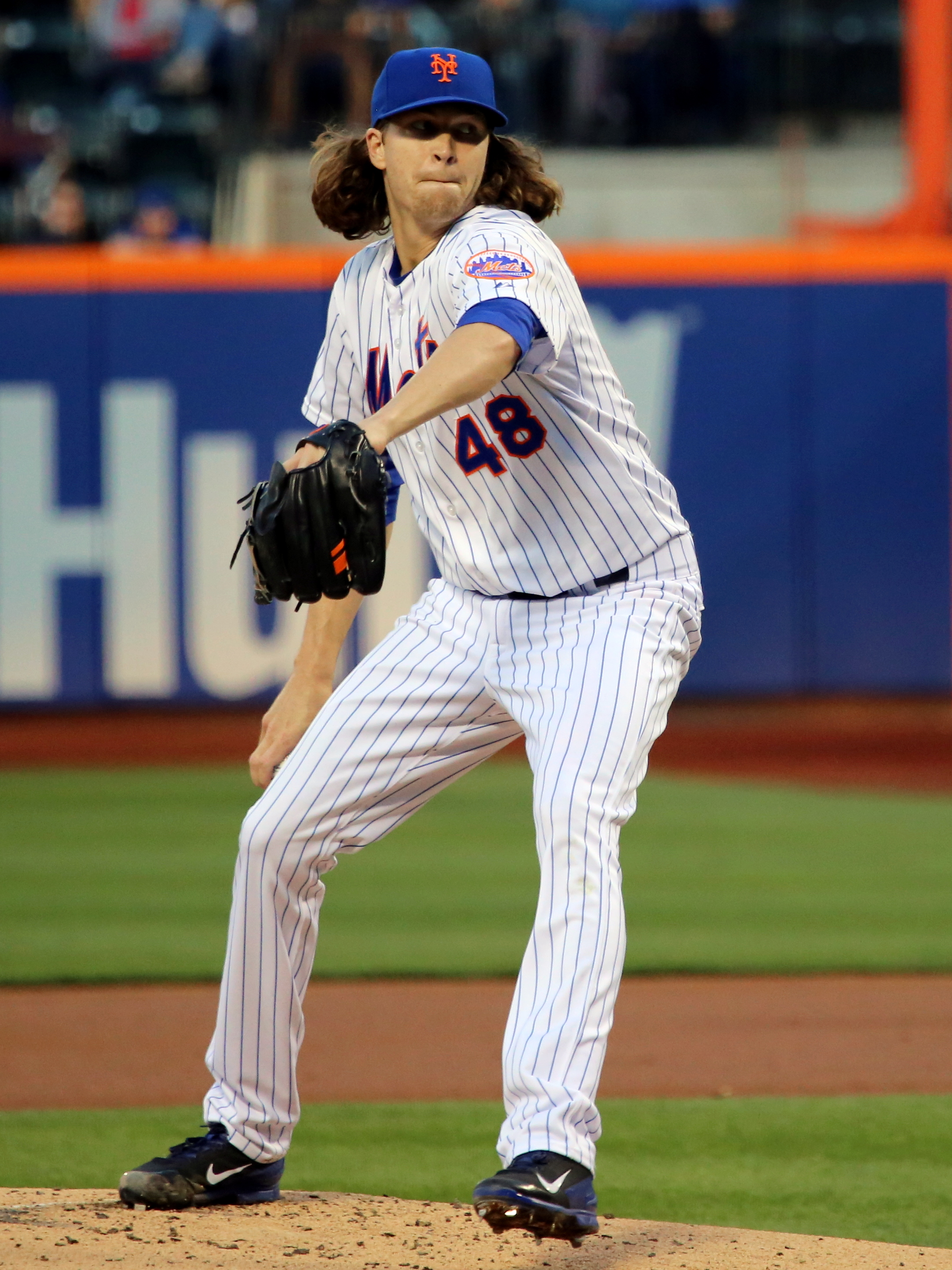
DeGrom with the Mets in 2015

Starting Game 1 of the 2015 National League Division Series, he allowed no runs and five hits over seven innings pitched and tied a Mets franchise postseason record with 13 strikeouts (set by Tom Seaver, Game 1 of the 1973 National League Championship Series). DeGrom won the deciding Game 5 with a six-inning, two-run effort. In Game 3 of the 2015 NLCS against the Chicago Cubs, deGrom pitched seven-inning game, allowing just two runs on four hits, one walk and seven strikeouts, putting the Mets ahead 3–0 and within one game of their first World Series appearance since 2000. DeGrom started Game 2 of the 2015 World Series on October 28; he allowed four runs on six hits and three walks over five innings and took the loss as the Royals went up 2–0 in the series.

Following the season, deGrom received a Wilson Defensive Player of the Year Award as the best defensive player statistically at his position in MLB. He also placed seventh in Cy Young Award voting.

==== 2016 ====
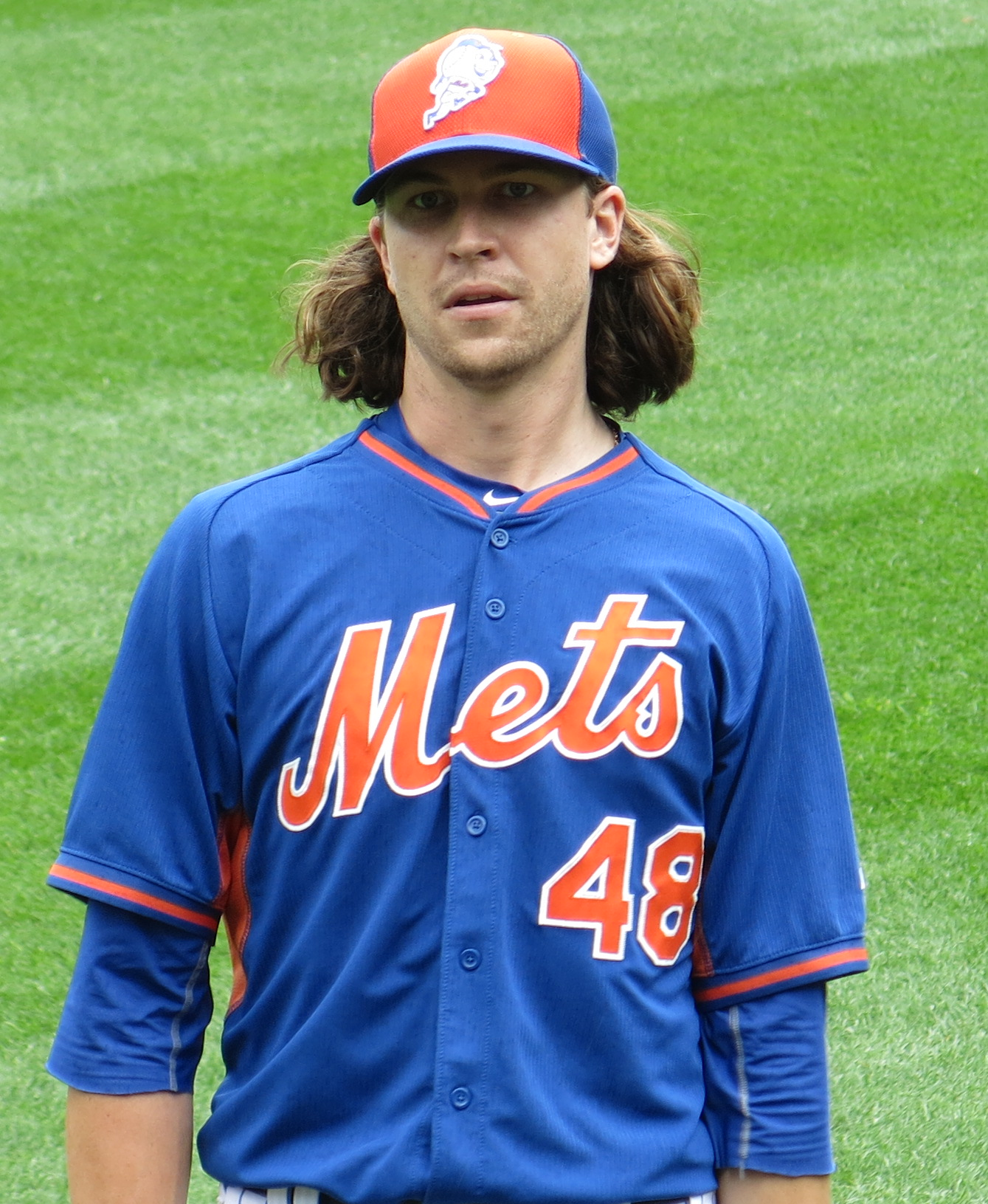
DeGrom with the Mets in 2016

DeGrom initially refused to sign the 2016 contract for the $607,000 salary assigned to him. Not yet eligible for salary arbitration, deGrom was bound by the MLB collective bargaining agreement to accept the salary assigned to him by his club. He relented and reluctantly capitulated to signing his contract early in spring training.

On July 17 at Citizens Bank Park in Philadelphia, deGrom pitched a shutout against the Philadelphia Phillies, allowing only one hit and one walk while striking out seven batters. His game score of 97 was tied for second-best in Mets history in a nine-inning game. DeGrom's final pitching appearance of the season came on September 1, when he faced the Miami Marlins. He underwent season-ending surgery on his ulnar nerve in late September in order to relieve discomfort in his elbow and numbness in his fingers which had plagued him during the 2016 season.

==== 2017 ====
Eligible for salary arbitration for the first time, deGrom and the Mets avoided an arbitration hearing by agreeing to a salary of $4.05 million for the 2017 season.

On June 18, 2017, deGrom hit his first major league home run at Citi Field against Joe Ross of the Washington Nationals. DeGrom was named NL Player of the Week for the week of June 12–18 after hitting his first home run, posting a 0.53 ERA, allowing eight hits, striking out 12 and walking six in 17 innings over two starts. He recorded wins in eight consecutive starts from June 12 until July 24, tying a franchise record previously set by Seaver, David Cone and Bobby Jones. DeGrom had the first stolen base of his career on August 4 off of Yu Darvish and Yasmani Grandal of the Los Angeles Dodgers. He became the first Mets pitcher to steal a base since Óliver Pérez in 2008.

Of the seven potential starting pitchers who began the season with the Mets, deGrom was the only one who finished the 2017 season without spending any time on the disabled list. DeGrom finished the season with a record of 15–10 and a 3.53 ERA. He finished eighth in voting for the 2017 NL Cy Young Award.

==== 2018 ====
DeGrom and the Mets agreed on a $7.4 million salary for the 2018 season. On May 6, the Mets placed deGrom on the 10-day disabled list, retroactive to May 3, with a hyperextended pitching elbow. DeGrom had suffered the minor injury while batting during his May 2 start against the Braves. Owning a 1.68 ERA that led the major leagues, deGrom was named to the 2018 MLB All-Star Game.

During the All-Star break, Brodie Van Wagenen, deGrom's sports agent, called for the Mets to engage in contract extension talks, or to "seriously consider trade opportunities now". On September 3, deGrom tied a major league record with his 25th straight start allowing three or fewer runs. He recorded his 1,000th career strikeout in his final start of the season on September 26 at Citi Field.

DeGrom finished the season 10–9 with a 1.70 ERA, which led the majors and was the third-lowest of any pitcher with 30 starts in a season since the pitching mound was lowered following the 1968 season. For the 2018 season, he led the majors in lowest home runs per nine innings (0.41). On November 14, deGrom was announced as the National League Cy Young Award winner; he received all but one first place vote. His 10 wins were the fewest in history by a Cy Young Award-winning starting pitcher. DeGrom finished fifth in the National League Most Valuable Player voting and was the only player other than award winner Christian Yelich to receive a first place vote.

==== 2019 ====
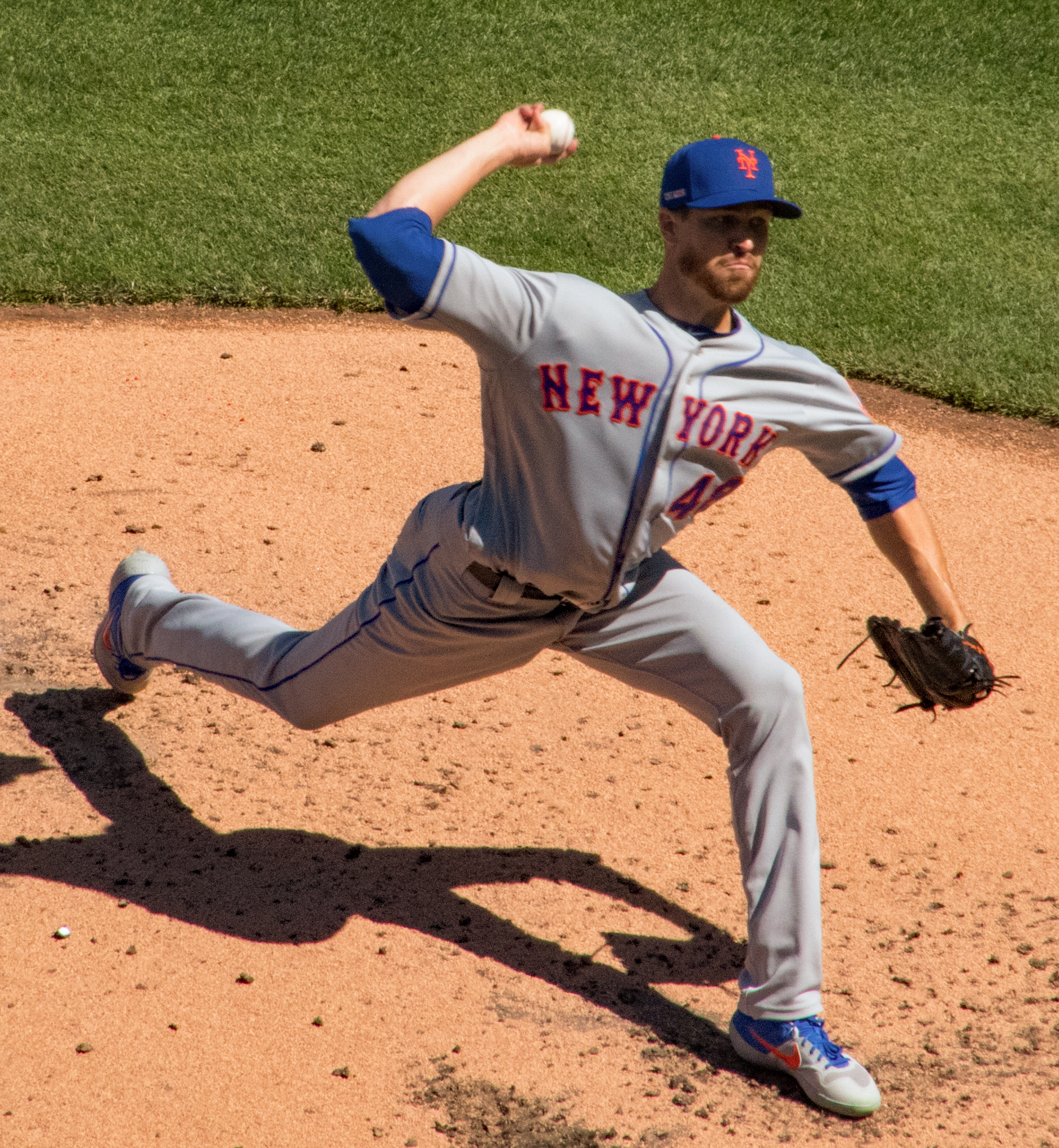
DeGrom with the Mets in 2019

During the 2018–19 offseason, the Mets hired Van Wagenen as their general manager. DeGrom and the Mets agreed to a $17 million salary for the 2019 season, the largest annual raise ever for an arbitration-eligible player. With Van Wagenen now negotiating for the Mets rather than deGrom, the two sides agreed to a five-year, $137.5 million contract extension with an option for the 2024 season during spring training in 2019. DeGrom started for the Mets on Opening Day against Max Scherzer, the 2018 Cy Young Award runner-up to deGrom and the 2017 Cy Young Award winner. DeGrom set a career-high in strikeouts in his next start on April 3 with 14. He began the first half of the 2019 season with a 4–7 record and a 3.27 ERA while striking out 138 batters. He was then named to the NL roster in the 2019 MLB All-Star Game. DeGrom had a remarkable second half, posting a 7–1 record with a 1.44 ERA and 117 strikeouts. Over the complete season, he pitched 204 innings and finished with a 2.43 ERA, a 0.97 WHIP, and 255 strikeouts. He won his second straight Cy Young Award in a near-unanimous vote, receiving 29 of 30 first-place votes, becoming the 11th pitcher in history to win back-to-back Cy Young Awards.

In December 2019, the New York Post named him their New York Athlete of the Decade over such competition as Eli Manning, Henrik Lundqvist, Mariano Rivera, and Derek Jeter.

==== 2020 ====
In the shortened 60-game 2020 season, deGrom was 4–2 with a 2.38 ERA, and led the National League in strikeouts for the second consecutive season, with 104. He led the NL in strikeouts per 9 innings pitched (13.765), was 3rd in walks plus hits per inning pitched (0.956) and hits per 9 innings pitched (6.221), 4th in earned run average, 6th in win–loss percentage (.667) and home runs per 9 innings pitched (0.927), and 8th in walks per 9 innings pitched (2.382). His $25 million salary was the 10th-highest in the NL. He finished third in NL Cy Young Award voting.

==== 2021 ====
On April 23, 2021, in a start against the Washington Nationals, deGrom set a record for most strikeouts in the first four starts of a season with 50. He pitched a complete game shutout with a career-high 15 strikeouts, only 2 hits, and no walks. In addition, deGrom went 2–4 at the plate with a run batted in. In the same game, he lowered his career ERA to 2.55, setting a franchise record. He was named April's National League Pitcher of the Month for the first time in his career.

On June 5, deGrom threw seven scoreless innings against the San Diego Padres, lowering his earned run average to 0.62, the lowest by any pitcher in history through nine starts. On June 11, deGrom pitched six scoreless innings against the Padres, improving his earned run average to 0.56, the lowest by any pitcher through his first ten starts of the season. DeGrom had also thrown 100 strikeouts in just 61 2/3 innings, achieving the mark in the fewest innings since the mound was moved to its current distance from home plate in 1893. At that point in the season, deGrom also had more RBI on the year (6) than earned runs allowed (4). Through 12 starts, deGrom's walks plus hits per inning pitched was 0.51. Since at least 1901, no major league pitcher has had a walks plus hits to inning pitched ratio that low during 12 consecutive starts. He was named to the 2021 MLB All-Star Game, his fourth career nomination, although he announced he would not play. On July 7, deGrom earned his 1,500th career strikeout against Milwaukee Brewers shortstop Willy Adames. He achieved it in 198 career starts, becoming the 2nd-fastest pitcher to reach the mark behind Yu Darvish who did it in 197 career starts.

On July 18, deGrom began to feel tightness in his forearm during a bullpen session and was subsequently placed by the Mets onto the 10-day injured list. Later in the month, deGrom also started feeling soreness in his elbow. An MRI revealed inflammation in his elbow but with no structural damage. On August 20, deGrom was transferred to the 60-day IL to make room for relief pitcher Heath Hembree. DeGrom did not pitch for the remainder of the 2021 season.

Overall in 2021, deGrom posted a 7–2 record in 15 starts and recorded a 1.08 ERA with 146 strikeouts and 11 walks in 92 innings. He was a finalist for the Silver Slugger Award, which was won by Max Fried.

==== 2022 ====
DeGrom suffered a stress reaction, the precursor to a stress fracture in his right scapula during spring training, an injury that caused him to miss the beginning of the 2022 season. DeGrom began a rehab assignment with the St. Lucie Mets in July 2022, and after two successful starts, he progressed to the Triple-A Syracuse Mets.

DeGrom made his 2022 season debut for the Mets on August 2, 2022, against the Washington Nationals, allowing one run and striking out six in five innings. A September 13 start against the Cubs was deGrom's 39th consecutive start allowing three or fewer earned runs, tying a major league record set by Jim Scott of the Chicago White Sox in 1914. In his next start, on September 18, he broke Scott's record. The stat line for deGrom in 2022 included a 3.08 ERA over 11 starts, with 102 strikeouts.

At the end of the regular season, deGrom allowed at least three runs in four straight games, marking his worst stretch since 2017. However, deGrom bounced back in Game 2 of the NL Wild Card Series against the San Diego Padres, as the Mets faced elimination. That night, deGrom allowed just two runs in six innings pitched with eight strikeouts, as the Mets won the game 7–3, although they eventually lost the series in Game 3.

Following the end of the season, deGrom opted out of his contract, joining a group of several other Mets entering free agency.

=== Texas Rangers (2023–present) ===
On December 2, 2022, deGrom signed a five-year, $185 million contract with the Texas Rangers.

==== 2023 ====
In March and April of 2023 deGrom made six starts for Texas, posting a 2.67 ERA with 45 strikeouts in 30 1/3 innings pitched. Having last pitched on April 28th, the Rangers announced, on June 6, 2023, that deGrom would require Tommy John surgery after suffering a torn UCL in his right elbow. With deGrom sidelined for the remainder of the season, the Rangers went on to win the 2023 World Series.

==== 2024 ====
DeGrom returned from Tommy John surgery on September 13, 2024 and made his first major league start since April 28, 2023, a span of 504 days, against the Seattle Mariners. He went 3⅔ innings, struck out four, gave up four hits, and allowed zero runs on 61 pitches. Across three starts in 2024, deGrom recorded a 1.69 ERA with 14 strikeouts across 10⅓ innings.

==== 2025 ====
On May 4, 2025, against the Seattle Mariners, deGrom pitched his 1,700th career strikeout, making him the fastest pitcher to do it since at least 1901, doing so in 225 games. On July 6, deGrom was named to the 2025 All-Star Game roster, his fifth career selection, and first since 2021. At the time, deGrom's 2.13 ERA and 0.89 WHIP ranked third and fourth in the major leagues.

On August 3, against the Mariners, deGrom logged his 1,800th career strikeout. deGrom became the fastest MLB pitcher in history to reach this milestone in 240 games and 1,493.1 innings. On September 24, deGrom pitched five innings of one run ball, striking out eight batters in a 4–2 victory over the Minnesota Twins in his final start of 2025. With the performance, deGrom became the eighth pitcher in Rangers history to have 30+ starts and a sub-3.00 ERA in a season, which he had not accomplished since 2019.

Overall in 2025, deGrom posted a 12–8 record in 30 starts and recorded a 2.97 ERA with 185 strikeouts and 37 walks in 172 2/3 innings. After the conclusion of the season, deGrom was named AL Comeback Player of the Year.

==== 2026 ====
On May 10, in a 3–0 victory over the Chicago Cubs, deGrom notched his 1,900th career strikeout, making him the second fastest pitcher to do so by starts (257, behind Randy Johnson’s 252) and innings pitched (1,578⅓, behind Chris Sale’s 1,560⅓).

On June 1, 2026, deGrom earned the 100th win of his career after throwing five shutout innings with eight strikeouts in a 2–1 victory over the St. Louis Cardinals. At the trade deadline, it was reported that deGrom had invoked his no-trade clause, blocking a trade and remaining with the Rangers. It was later speculated that the trade was to the Atlanta Braves involving a package that included Spencer Strider.

On August 20, in a 2–0 victory over the Washington Nationals, deGrom recorded his 2,000th career strikeout, making him the second fastest pitcher to do so by starts (272, behind Randy Johnson’s 262) and innings pitched (1,661, behind Chris Sale’s 1,626). Five days later, deGrom had the worst game of his career against the Chicago White Sox, as he allowed six runs in the first inning alone. He gave up eight runs overall before getting pulled in favor of Peyton Gray in the fourth inning.

Overall in 2026, deGrom posted an 11–11 record in 31 starts and recorded a 4.20 ERA with 201 strikeouts and 46 walks in 162 2/3 innings. His 4.20 ERA was the highest single-season ERA of his career (closest being a 3.53 ERA in 2017), while his 201 strikeouts marked his first 200+ strikeout season since throwing 255 in 2019.

== Personal life ==
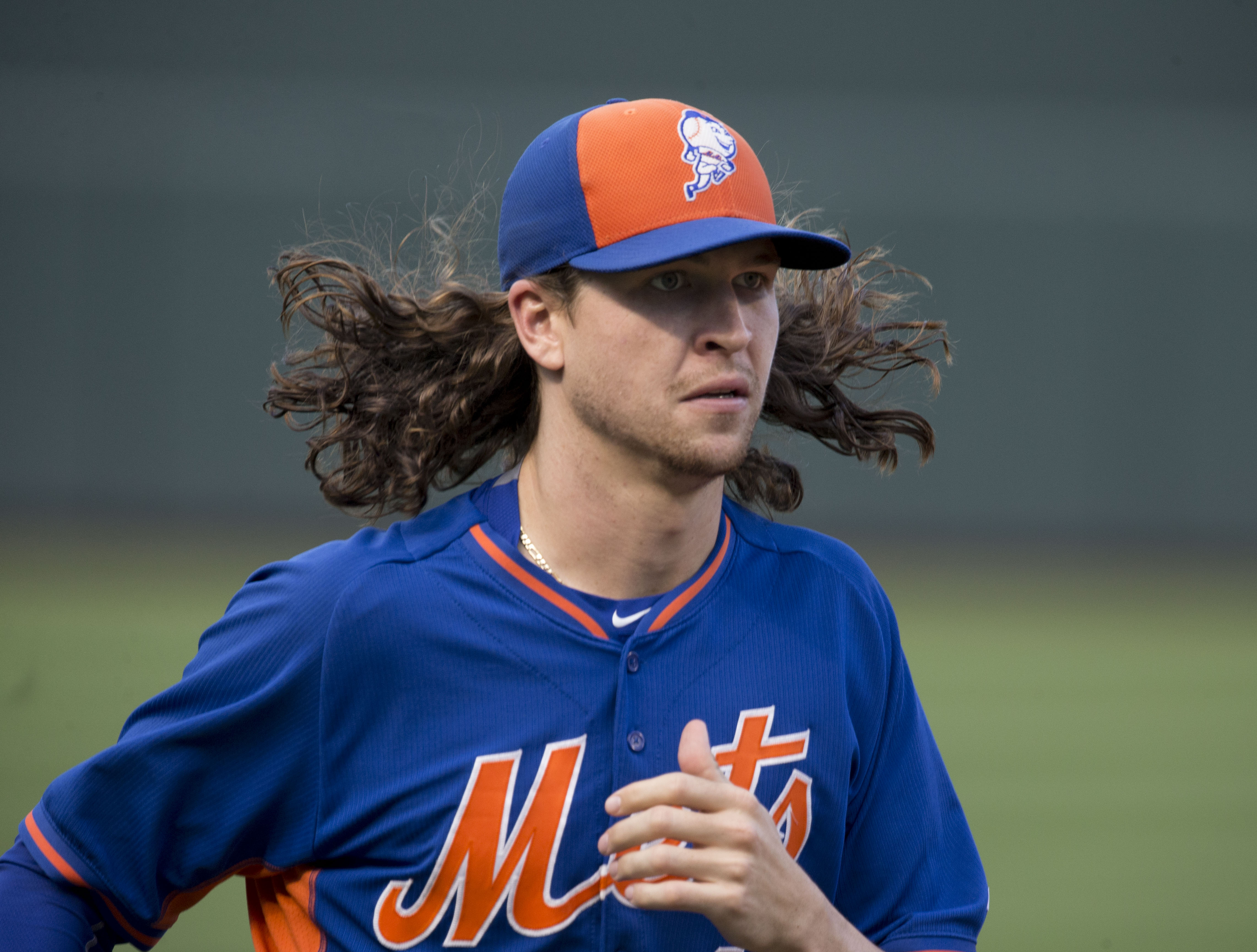
DeGrom with the Mets in 2015

DeGrom is from DeLeon Springs, Florida. He was raised by his parents, Tony, an AT&T lineman, and Tammy, a customer service representative for a credit card rewards program. Tony deGrom built a batting cage in the backyard for his son to practice. Jacob deGrom credits his father for his quiet intensity and remembers demanding sessions playing catch in their yard. He says his father said to stay humble. He has two sisters, Sarah and Jessica. He grew up an Atlanta Braves fan.

Shortly after graduating from high school deGrom met his wife, Stacey. They were married in November 2014 and live in DeLeon Springs, FL. They had a son in April 2016, a daughter in February 2018. They have a Morkie, which is a combination of a Maltese and a Yorkie.

At Stetson, deGrom began to grow out his hair. His starts with the Mets led to the trending hashtag on Twitter of "#hairwego". DeGrom's hair inspired a promotional "Jacob deGrom Hair Hat" giveaway at Citi Field during the 2016 season. After learning that an unnamed major league hitter said that deGrom's hair made it harder to pick up the ball out of his hand, deGrom said in 2016 that he would never cut his hair. However, he cut his hair during the 2017–18 offseason, saying that it could add speed to his fastball and also that he was tired of having long hair.

== See also ==
- List of New York Mets Opening Day starting pitchers
- List of Texas Rangers Opening Day starting pitchers
- List of Major League Baseball annual ERA leaders
- List of Major League Baseball annual strikeout leaders
- List of Major League Baseball career ERA leaders
- List of Major League Baseball career FIP leaders
- List of Major League Baseball career WHIP leaders
- List of Major League Baseball career strikeout leaders

== Notes ==
Awards and achievements
Preceded by Noah Syndergaard	New York Mets Opening Day; Starting pitcher 2019–2021	Succeeded by Tylor Megill
Preceded by Jon Gray	Texas Rangers Opening Day; Starting pitcher 2023	Succeeded by Nathan Eovaldi
Preceded by Trevor Bauer; Kevin Gausman	National League Pitcher of the Month; April 2021; June 2021	Succeeded by Kevin Gausman; Walker Buehler
