= List of New York Mets Opening Day starting pitchers =

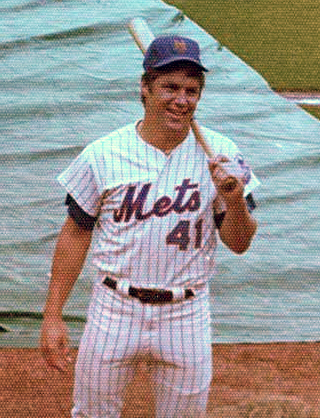
Tom Seaver made eleven Opening Day starts for the Mets.

The New York Mets are a Major League Baseball (MLB) franchise based in Flushing, Queens, in New York City. They play in the National League East division. The first game of the new baseball season for a team is played on Opening Day, and being named the Opening Day starter is an honor, which is often given to the player who is expected to lead the pitching staff that season, though there are various strategic reasons why a team's best pitcher might not start on Opening Day. The New York Mets have used 27 different Opening Day starting pitchers in their 59 seasons. The 27 starters have a combined Opening Day record of 29 wins, 13 losses (29–13) and 17 no decisions. No decisions are only awarded to the starting pitcher if the game is won or lost after the starting pitcher has left the game.

Tom Seaver holds the Mets' record for most Opening Day starts with 11, and has an Opening Day record of 6–0. He also has the most starts in Shea Stadium, the Mets' home ballpark from 1964 through 2008. Seaver and Dwight Gooden hold the Mets' record for most Opening Day wins with six each. Al Jackson and Roger Craig share the worst winning percentage as the Opening Day starting pitcher with a record of 0–2.

From 1968 through 1983, Mets' Opening Day starting pitchers went 16 consecutive years without a loss. During this period, Tom Seaver won six starts with five no decisions, Craig Swan won two starts, and Jerry Koosman, Pat Zachry and Randy Jones won one start apiece. Furthermore, in the 31-year period from 1968 through 1998, Mets' Opening Day starting pitchers only lost two games. During that period, they won 19 games with 10 no decisions. The only losses during this period were by Mike Torrez in 1984 and by Dwight Gooden in 1990.

Overall, Mets Opening Day starting pitchers have a record of 0–1 at the Polo Grounds, a 12–5 record with five no decisions at Shea Stadium and a 3–0 record with three no decisions at Citi Field. In addition, although the Mets were nominally the home team in 2000, the game was played in Tokyo Dome in Tokyo, Japan. Mike Hampton started the game in Tokyo and lost, making the Mets' Opening Day starting pitchers' combined home record 15–7, and their away record 14–6. The Mets went on to play in the World Series in 1969, 1973, 1986, 2000 and 2015, and won the 1969 and 1986 World Series championship games. Tom Seaver (1969 and 1973), Dwight Gooden (1986), Mike Hampton (2000) and Bartolo Colón (2015) were the Opening Day starting pitchers when the Mets played in the World Series, and they had a combined Opening Day record of 3–1 with one no decision.

== Key ==
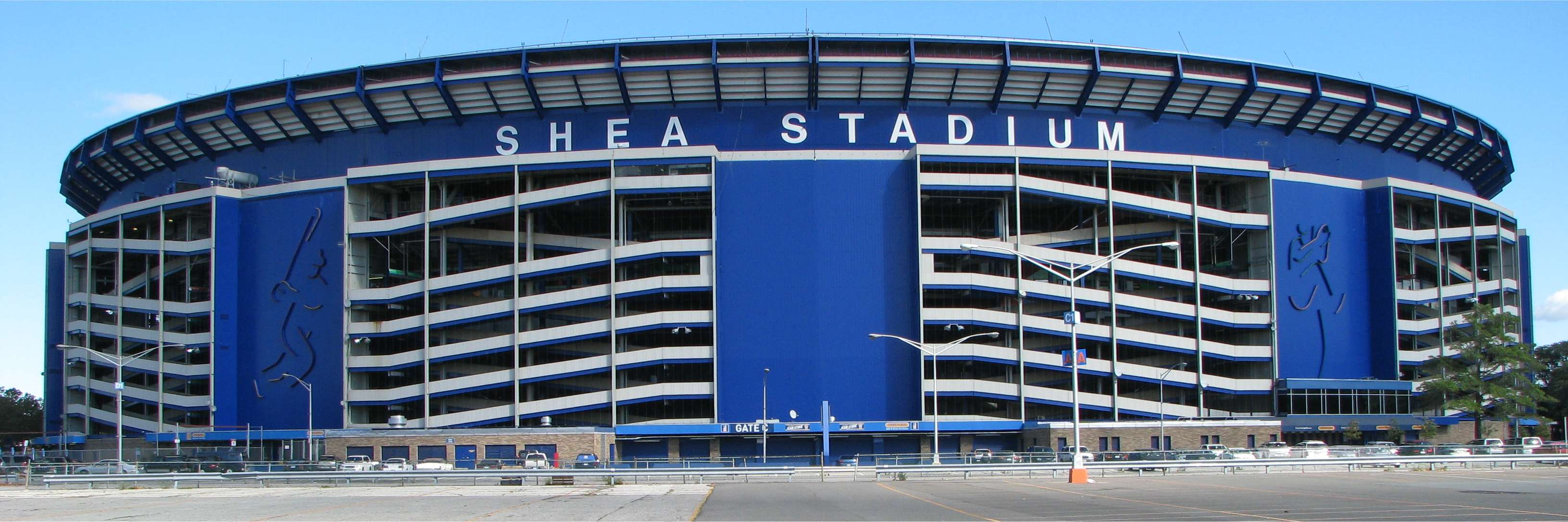
Shea Stadium, site of 22 Opening Day starts by New York Mets pitchers

Season	Each year is linked to an article about that particular Mets season.
W	Win
L	Loss
ND (W)	No decision by starting pitcher; Mets won game
ND (L)	No decision by starting pitcher; Mets lost game
Location	Stadium in italics for home game
Pitcher (#)	Number of appearances as Opening Day starter with the Mets
*	Advanced to the post-season
**	NL Champions
†	World Series Champions

== Pitchers ==
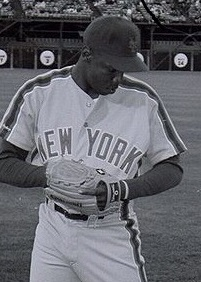
Dwight Gooden made eight Opening Day starts for the Mets, winning six

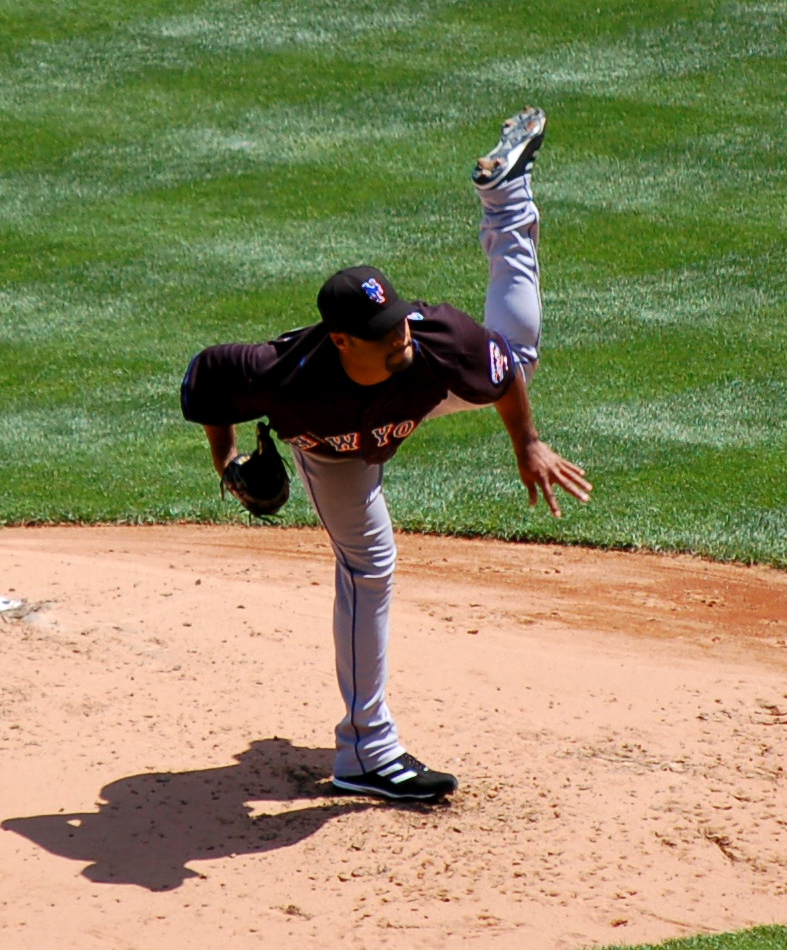
Johan Santana, the 2008, 2009, 2010 and 2012 Opening Day starter

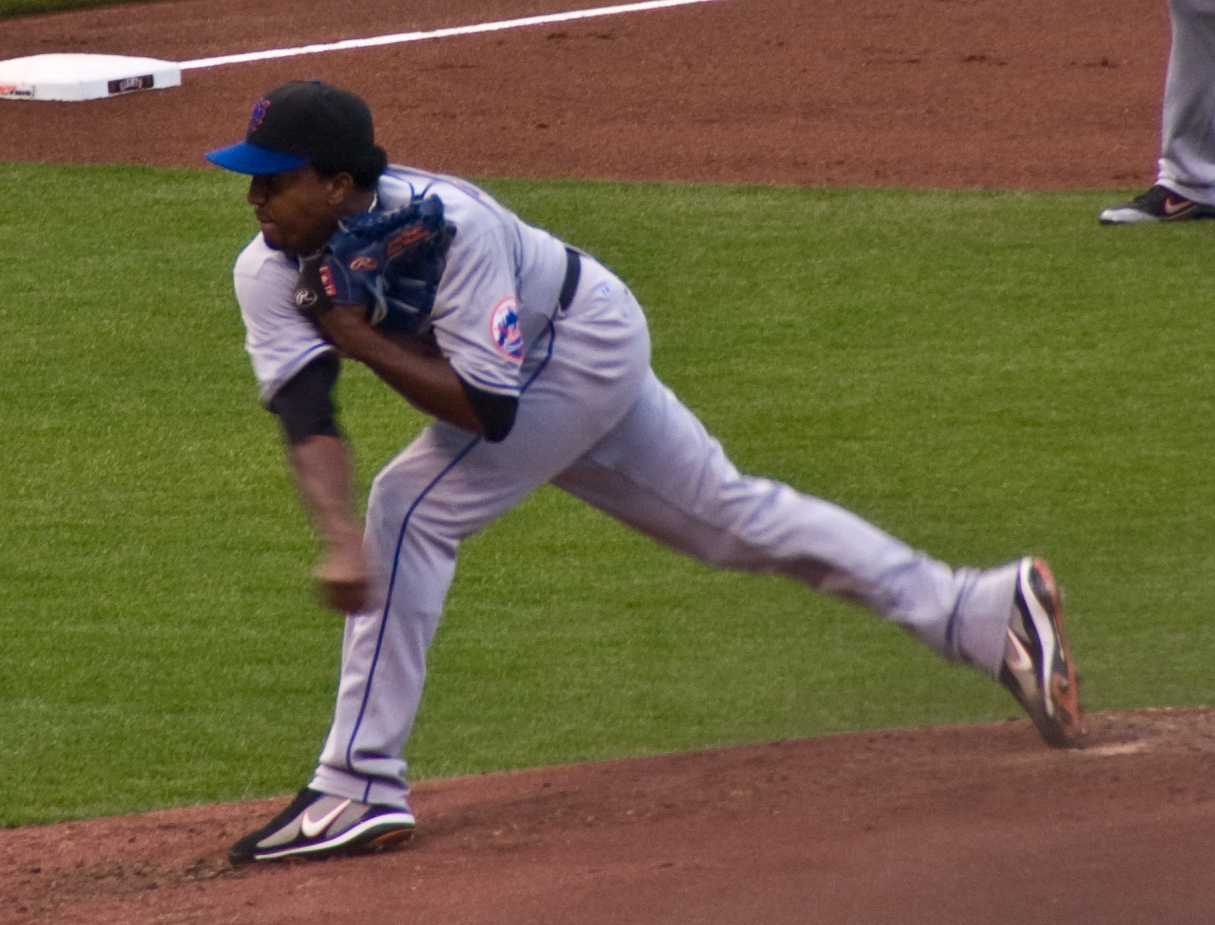
Pedro Martínez, the 2005 Opening Day starter

Season	Pitcher	Decision	Opponent	Location	Ref(s)
1962	Roger Craig	L	St. Louis Cardinals	Sportsman's Park	
1963	Roger Craig (2)	L	St. Louis Cardinals	Polo Grounds	
1964	Al Jackson	L	Philadelphia Phillies	Connie Mack Stadium	
1965	Al Jackson (2)	L	Los Angeles Dodgers	Shea Stadium	
1966	Jack Fisher	L	Atlanta Braves	Shea Stadium	
1967	Don Cardwell	L	Pittsburgh Pirates	Shea Stadium	
1968	Tom Seaver	ND (L)	San Francisco Giants	Candlestick Park	
1969†	Tom Seaver (2)	ND (L)	Montreal Expos	Shea Stadium	
1970	Tom Seaver (3)	ND (W)	Pittsburgh Pirates	Forbes Field	
1971	Tom Seaver (4)	W	Montreal Expos	Shea Stadium	
1972	Tom Seaver (5)	W	Pittsburgh Pirates	Shea Stadium	
1973**	Tom Seaver (6)	W	Philadelphia Phillies	Shea Stadium	
1974	Tom Seaver (7)	ND (L)	Philadelphia Phillies	Veterans Stadium	
1975	Tom Seaver (8)	W	Philadelphia Phillies	Shea Stadium	
1976	Tom Seaver (9)	W	Montreal Expos	Jarry Park Stadium	
1977	Tom Seaver (10)	W	Chicago Cubs	Wrigley Field	
1978	Jerry Koosman	W	Montreal Expos	Shea Stadium	
1979	Craig Swan	W	Chicago Cubs	Wrigley Field	
1980	Craig Swan (2)	W	Chicago Cubs	Shea Stadium	
1981	Pat Zachry	W	Chicago Cubs	Wrigley Field	
1982	Randy Jones	W	Philadelphia Phillies	Veterans Stadium	
1983	Tom Seaver (11)	ND (W)	Philadelphia Phillies	Shea Stadium	
1984	Mike Torrez	L	Cincinnati Reds	Riverfront Stadium	
1985	Dwight Gooden	ND (W)	St. Louis Cardinals	Shea Stadium	
1986†	Dwight Gooden (2)	W	Pittsburgh Pirates	Three Rivers Stadium	
1987	Bobby Ojeda	W	Pittsburgh Pirates	Shea Stadium	
1988*	Dwight Gooden (3)	W	Montreal Expos	Olympic Stadium	
1989	Dwight Gooden (4)	W	St. Louis Cardinals	Shea Stadium	
1990	Dwight Gooden (5)	L	Pittsburgh Pirates	Shea Stadium	
1991	Dwight Gooden (6)	W	Philadelphia Phillies	Shea Stadium	
1992	David Cone	ND (W)	St. Louis Cardinals	Busch Memorial Stadium	
1993	Dwight Gooden (7)	W	Colorado Rockies	Shea Stadium	
1994	Dwight Gooden (8)	W	Chicago Cubs	Wrigley Field	
1995	Bobby Jones	ND (L)	Colorado Rockies	Coors Field	
1996	Bobby Jones (2)	ND (W)	St. Louis Cardinals	Shea Stadium	
1997	Pete Harnisch	ND (L)	San Diego Padres	Qualcomm Stadium	
1998	Bobby Jones (3)	ND (W)	Philadelphia Phillies	Shea Stadium	
1999*	Al Leiter	L	Florida Marlins	Pro Player Stadium	
2000**	Mike Hampton	L	Chicago Cubs	Tokyo Dome	
2001	Al Leiter (2)	ND (W)	Atlanta Braves	Turner Field	
2002	Al Leiter (3)	W	Pittsburgh Pirates	Shea Stadium	
2003	Tom Glavine	L	Chicago Cubs	Shea Stadium	
2004	Tom Glavine (2)	W	Atlanta Braves	Turner Field	
2005	Pedro Martinez	ND (L)	Cincinnati Reds	Great American Ball Park	
2006*	Tom Glavine (3)	W	Washington Nationals	Shea Stadium	
2007	Tom Glavine (4)	W	St. Louis Cardinals	Busch Stadium	
2008	Johan Santana	W	Florida Marlins	Dolphin Stadium	
2009	Johan Santana (2)	W	Cincinnati Reds	Great American Ball Park	
2010	Johan Santana (3)	W	Florida Marlins	Citi Field	
2011	Mike Pelfrey	L	Florida Marlins	Sun Life Stadium	
2012	Johan Santana (4)	ND (W)	Atlanta Braves	Citi Field	
2013	Jon Niese	W	San Diego Padres	Citi Field	
2014	Dillon Gee	ND (L)	Washington Nationals	Citi Field	
2015**	Bartolo Colón	W	Washington Nationals	Nationals Park	
2016*	Matt Harvey	L	Kansas City Royals	Kauffman Stadium	
2017	Noah Syndergaard	ND (W)	Atlanta Braves	Citi Field	
2018	Noah Syndergaard (2)	W	St. Louis Cardinals	Citi Field	
2019	Jacob deGrom	W	Washington Nationals	Nationals Park	
2020	Jacob deGrom (2)	ND (W)	Atlanta Braves	Citi Field	
2021	Jacob deGrom (3)	ND (L)	Philadelphia Phillies	Citizens Bank Park	
2022*	Tylor Megill	W	Washington Nationals	Nationals Park	
2023	Max Scherzer	W	Miami Marlins	LoanDepot Park	
2024*	José Quintana	L	Milwaukee Brewers	Citi Field	
2025	Clay Holmes	L	Houston Astros	Daikin Park	
2026	Freddy Peralta	W	Pittsburgh Pirates	Citi Field	
