= Pedro Martínez =

Dominican baseball pitcher (born 1971)

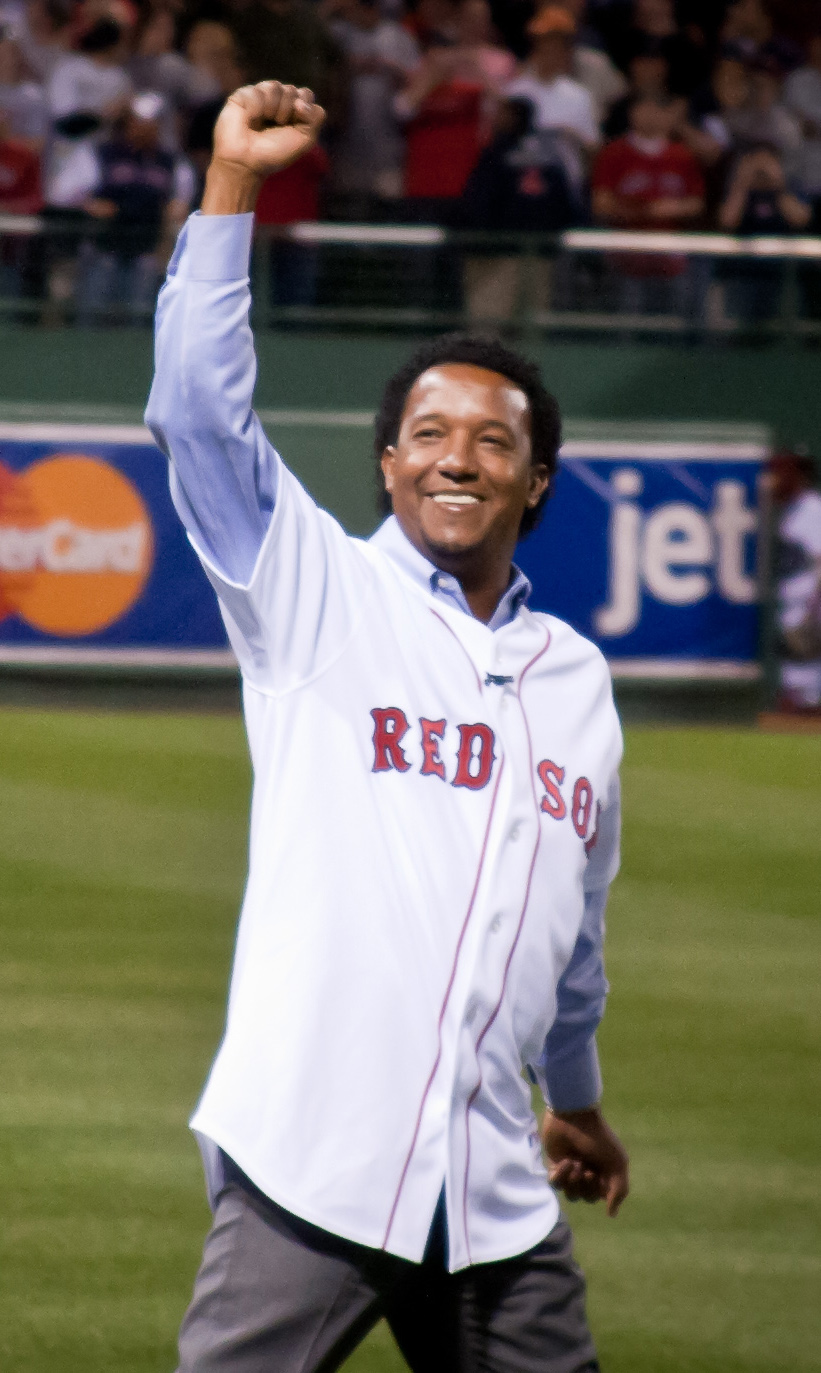
- Martínez in 2010
- Pitcher
- Born: October 25, 1971 (age 55); Manoguayabo, Dominican Republic
- Batted: Right Threw: Right

MLB debut
- September 24, 1992, for the Los Angeles Dodgers

Last MLB appearance
- September 30, 2009, for the Philadelphia Phillies

MLB statistics
- Win–loss record: 219–100
- Earned run average: 2.93
- Strikeouts: 3,154
- Stats at Baseball Reference

Teams
- Los Angeles Dodgers (1992–1993); Montreal Expos (1994–1997); Boston Red Sox (1998–2004); New York Mets (2005–2008); Philadelphia Phillies (2009)

Career highlights and awards
- 8× All-Star (1996–2000, 2002, 2005, 2006); World Series champion (2004); 3× Cy Young Award (1997, 1999, 2000); Triple Crown (1999); MLB wins leader (1999); 5× MLB ERA leader (1997, 1999, 2000, 2002, 2003); 3× AL strikeout leader (1999, 2000, 2002); Boston Red Sox No. 45 retired; Boston Red Sox Hall of Fame

Member of the National

Baseball Hall of Fame
- Induction: 2015
- Vote: 91.1% (first ballot)

Pedro Jaime Martínez (born October 25, 1971) is a Dominican-American former professional baseball starting pitcher who played in Major League Baseball (MLB) from 1992 to 2009 for five teams, most notably the Boston Red Sox from 1998 to 2004.

As of 2023, Martínez's record of 219 wins and 100 losses places him tenth-highest in winning percentage in major league history and fifth-highest among pitchers with more than 2,000 career innings pitched. Martínez ended his career with an earned run average (ERA) of 2.93, among the lowest ever by a pitcher with at least 2,500 innings pitched since 1920. He reached the 3,000 strikeout mark in fewer innings than any pitcher except Randy Johnson and Max Scherzer; Martínez is the only pitcher other than Scherzer or Clayton Kershaw to compile over 3,000 career strikeouts with fewer than 3,000 innings pitched in his career. As of 2023, Martínez's career strikeout rate of 10.04 per nine innings ranks sixth all-time among pitchers with over 1,500 innings.

An eight-time All-Star, Martínez was at his peak from 1997 to 2003, establishing himself as one of the most dominant pitchers in baseball history. He won three Cy Young Awards (1997, 1999, 2000) and was runner-up twice (1998, 2002), posting a cumulative record of 118–36 (.766) with a 2.20 ERA, while leading his league in ERA five times and in winning percentage and strikeouts three times each. In 1999, Martínez was runner-up for the American League (AL) Most Valuable Player Award, after winning the pitching Triple Crown with a 23–4 record, 2.07 ERA, and 313 strikeouts, and—along with Johnson—joined Gaylord Perry in the rare feat of winning the Cy Young Award in both the American and National Leagues (a feat since accomplished by Randy Johnson, Roger Clemens, Roy Halladay, Max Scherzer, and Blake Snell). He recorded the second-lowest single-season Fielding Independent Pitching (FIP) in the live ball era (1.39 in 1999), the second-lowest single-season WHIP total in major league history (0.737 in 2000), and the highest single-season Adjusted ERA+ in major league history (291, also in 2000). Although his performance suffered a steep decline in 2004, Martínez ended the season memorably by helping the Red Sox end a long drought in winning their first World Series title in 86 years.

Officially listed at 5 ft 11 in (1.80 m) and 170 pounds (77 kg), Martínez was unusually small for a modern-day power pitcher, and is believed to have been somewhat smaller than his officially listed height and weight. In his early 30s, injuries began to keep him off the field to an increasing extent, with his appearances and success dropping off sharply in his final seasons. Modern sabermetric analysis has strongly highlighted Martínez's achievements. As of 2023, his career strikeout-to-walk ratio, WHIP, and adjusted ERA+ are among the highest in major league history. Martínez dominated while pitching most often in a hitter-friendly ballpark and facing some of the toughest competition during the steroid era, which is generally thought to have favored batters. Many consider Martínez to be one of the greatest pitchers in major league history. He was elected to the Baseball Hall of Fame in 2015 in his first year of eligibility, joining Juan Marichal as the second Dominican to be enshrined; his number (45) was retired by the Red Sox in a ceremony held two days after his Hall induction.

== Early life ==
Pedro Jaime Martínez was born on October 25, 1971, in the Dominican Republic in the Santo Domingo suburb of Manoguayabo. He was the fifth of six siblings living in a palm wood house with a tin roof and dirt floors. His father, Pablo Jaime Abreu, (Note: His father, Pablo Jaime Abreu, is first-cousin of folk merengue musician Cheché Abreu.) worked odd jobs. His mother, Leopoldina Martínez, worked for traditionally wealthy families, washing their clothes. When Martínez was old enough to work, he held a job as a mechanic.

Martínez did not have enough money to afford baseballs, so he improvised with oranges. His older brother Ramón, was pitching at a Los Angeles Dodgers baseball camp in the Dominican Republic. As a young teenager, Martínez carried his brother's bags at the camp. One day at the camp, Ramón Martínez clocked his 14-year-old brother's pitches at between 78 and 80 miles per hour.

Martínez debuted professionally with the Tigres del Licey of the Dominican Winter League during the 1989–90 season. He then pitched briefly for the Azucareros del Este, before rejoining Licey in 1991–92 in a nine-player transaction that included George Bell, José Offerman and Julio Solano, among others.

== Professional career ==
=== Minor leagues ===
Martínez was originally signed by the Dodgers as an amateur free agent in 1988. In his first season in the minors he was assigned to the Great Falls Dodgers where he worked with coach Guy Conti to develop a circle changeup which Conti had learned from Johnny Podres. Conti also worked with the young pitcher on his English and helped him assimilate to the United States; Martínez later described Conti as his "white daddy." As a minor leaguer in the Dodgers farm system, he was a highly touted prospect although some talent evaluators took issue with his "poise" despite his having a "great fastball and circle-changeup."

=== Los Angeles Dodgers (1992–1993) ===
Martínez made his MLB debut on September 24, 1992, for the Dodgers against the Cincinnati Reds, working two scoreless innings of relief. He made his first start for the Dodgers on September 30, taking the loss while giving up two runs in a 3–1 loss to the Reds.

Although Martínez's brother Ramón, then a star pitcher for the Dodgers, declared that his brother was an even better pitcher than he, the younger Martínez was thought by manager Tommy Lasorda too small to be an effective starting pitcher at the MLB level; Lasorda used Pedro Martínez almost exclusively as a relief pitcher. Lasorda was not the first to question Martínez's stature and durability; at 135 pounds in the minor leagues, the Dodgers were concerned that he might lose weight from burning too many calories and threatened to fine him $500 if he was caught running. Martínez turned in a strong 1993 season as the Dodgers' setup man, going 10–5 with a 2.61 ERA and 119 strikeouts, in 65 games; his 107 innings led all NL relievers.

=== Montreal Expos (1994–1997) ===
With the Dodgers in need of a second baseman after a contract dispute with Jody Reed, Martínez was traded to the Montreal Expos for Delino DeShields before the 1994 season. It was with the Expos that Martínez developed into one of the top pitchers in baseball. Despite possessing a live fastball, he had difficulty maintaining control. It was during a bullpen session that manager Felipe Alou encouraged him to modify his primary grip on the fastball from two-seam to four-seam. The transformation was dramatic: the fastball − already among the fastest in the game − now was thrown with near-impeccable control and break that routinely overwhelmed hitters. On April 13, 1994, Martínez took a perfect game through 7 1/3 innings until throwing a brushback pitch at Reggie Sanders that led Sanders to immediately charge the mound, starting a bench-clearing brawl. Martínez ended up with a no-decision in the game, which the Expos eventually won 3–2.

On June 3, 1995, Martínez pitched nine perfect innings in a game against the San Diego Padres, before giving up a hit in the bottom of the 10th inning. He was immediately removed from the game, and was the winning pitcher in Montreal's 1–0 victory. [See Memorable Games]

In 1996, during a game against the Philadelphia Phillies, Mike Williams attempted to hit Martínez with retaliatory pitches for an earlier hit batter but failed with two consecutive attempts. After the second attempt, Martínez charged the mound, and started a bench-clearing fight.

In 1997, Martínez posted a 17–8 record for the Expos, and led the league in half a dozen pitching categories, including a 1.90 ERA, 305 strikeouts and 13 complete games pitched, while becoming the only Expo ever to win the National League Cy Young Award. The 13 complete games were tied for the second-highest single-season total in the modern era of baseball since Martínez's career began (Curt Schilling had 15 in 1998; Chuck Finley and Jack McDowell also reached 13 in a year). However, this 1997 total is by far the highest in Martínez's career, as he only completed more than five games in one other season (seven, in 2000). Martínez was the first right-handed pitcher to reach 300 strikeouts with an ERA under 2.00 since Walter Johnson in 1912.

=== Boston Red Sox (1998–2004) ===
Pedro Martínez's number 45 was retired by the Boston Red Sox in 2015.

Approaching free agency, Martínez was traded to the Boston Red Sox in November 1997 for Carl Pavano and Tony Armas Jr. Martínez was subsequently signed to a six-year, $75 million contract (with an option for a seventh year at $17 million) by Red Sox general manager Dan Duquette, at the time the largest ever awarded to a pitcher. Martínez paid immediate dividends in 1998, compiling a 19–7 record and finishing second in the American League in ERA, WHIP, strikeouts, and Cy Young Award voting.

In 1999, Martínez finished 23–4 with a 2.07 ERA and 313 strikeouts (earning the Pitching Triple Crown) in 213 1/3 innings across 31 games (29 starts). He led the entire major leagues with strikeouts per nine innings and strikeout-to-walk ratios of 13.20 and 8.46, respectively. His Fielding Independent Pitching (FIP) (a defense independent pitching statistic measuring a pitcher's effectiveness at limiting walks, home runs, and hits while accumulating strikeouts) of 1.39 was the lowest single-season total in the major leagues since 1910 among pitchers who threw more than 35 innings. The second best FIP in baseball in 1999 was Randy Johnson's 2.76, and that year, no one else in the American League had a FIP below 3.25. Martínez also became just the ninth modern pitcher to record a second 300-strikeout season, along with Randy Johnson (6 times), Nolan Ryan (6 times), Sandy Koufax (3 times), Curt Schilling (3 times), Walter Johnson, Sam McDowell, J. R. Richard, and Rube Waddell. An anomaly among power pitchers, Martínez is the only 20th-century pitcher to notch 300 strikeouts in a season without being at least six feet tall.

Martínez unanimously won his second Cy Young Award and finished second in the AL Most Valuable Player (MVP) ballot. The MVP result was controversial, as Martínez received the most first-place votes of any player (8 of 28), but was omitted from the ballots of two sportswriters, New York's George King and Minneapolis' LaVelle Neal. Buster Olney, writing for The New York Times, mused that the sentiment that pitchers should not be considered MVP candidates due to the existence of the pitcher-specific Cy Young Award may have cost Martínez the victory. King later wrote in The New York Post that he left Martínez off of his ballot because he believed that, since they only appear in a fraction of their team's games, starting pitchers should only be considered for the Cy Young Award. "It really made us all look very dumb", Olney later said. "People were operating under different rules. The question of eligibility is a very basic thing. People were determining eligibility for themselves." Texas Rangers catcher Iván Rodríguez narrowly won the award over Martínez, by a margin of 252 points to 239. Rodríguez had been included on all 28 ballots. When asked about the result by WEEI-FM radio in January 2012, Martínez said, "I'm not afraid to say that the way that George King and Mr. LaVelle Neal III went about it was unprofessional."

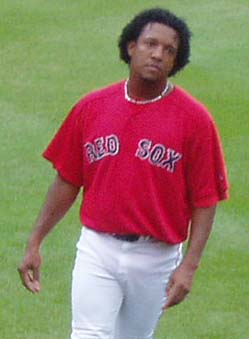
Martínez in 2004

Between April and May 1999, Martínez struck out 10 or more batters in seven consecutive starts. Between August 1999 and April 2000, Martínez achieved the same feat in 10 consecutive starts, averaging more than 15 strikeouts per nine innings during the latter streak. In 1999, Martínez recorded a strikeout in 40 consecutive innings, which at the time was a major league record. For his career, Martínez compiled 15 or more strikeouts in a game 10 times, which is tied with Roger Clemens for the third-most such games in history behind Nolan Ryan's 27 and Randy Johnson's 29.

Martínez was named the AL Pitcher of the Month in April, May, June, and September 1999—four times in a single season. Martínez punctuated his dominance in the 1999 All-Star Game at Fenway Park. He struck out National League players Barry Larkin, Larry Walker, Sammy Sosa, Mark McGwire, and Jeff Bagwell in two innings pitched, earning All-Star Game MVP for his performance. It was the first time that a pitcher had struck out the first four batters to start an All-Star Game. Martínez later said that the 1999 All-Star break was especially memorable for him because he was able to meet the members of the MLB All-Century Team and get an autograph from Ted Williams.

Martínez was a focal point of Boston's 1999 playoff series against the Cleveland Indians. Starting the series opener, he was forced out of the game after four shutout innings due to a strained back with the Red Sox up 2–0. The Red Sox, however, lost the game 3–2. With the series tied at two games apiece, Martínez was too injured to start the fifth and final game. However, neither team's starter was effective, and by the middle of the fourth inning, the game was tied 8–8. At this point, Martínez entered the game as an emergency relief option. He pitched six no-hit innings, striking out eight and walking three, as the Red Sox won the deciding game of the series 12–8. In the American League Championship Series, Martínez pitched seven shutout innings to beat the New York Yankees in Game 3, handing the soon-to-be World Series champions their only loss of the 1999 postseason.

Martínez followed up 1999 with another excellent season in 2000 en route to his third Cy Young Award. His ERA of 1.74 was the lowest American League total since 1978. The total was about a third of that year's park-adjusted league ERA (4.97), resulting in an adjusted ERA+ of 291, the second highest single-season total in major league history among pitchers who threw more than 200 innings. Roger Clemens' 2000 ERA of 3.70 was the second lowest in the AL, but it was still more than double that of Martínez's.

Martínez's record was 18–6. In his six losses, he recorded 60 strikeouts, eight walks, and 30 hits allowed in 48 innings, with a 2.44 ERA and a 0.79 WHIP, while averaging eight innings per start. Martínez's ERA in his losing games was lower than the best ERA in the National League (Kevin Brown's 2.58) across all games. Martínez's first loss of the year was a 1–0 complete game in which he had 17 strikeouts and one walk. All of Martínez's losses were quality starts, and he pitched eight or more innings in all but one of his losses. Martínez received two runs or fewer of run support in 10 of his starts (over one-third of his starts); in such games, his ERA was a minuscule 1.25 with 4 complete games and 2 shutouts, but his win–loss record was 4–5.

Martínez's WHIP in 2000 was 0.74, the second lowest total in major league history behind George Walker in 1940. However, Walker's record came in a season in which he only pitched 49 innings, whereas Martínez pitched 217 innings in 2000. Martínez struck out an American League-leading 284 batters while only walking 32, thereby breaking his own record for the highest single-season strikeout-to-walk ratio (8.88) in American League history. (Note: Martínez had set the record the previous season with a total of 8.46 strikeouts per walk. The current record-holder in both the American League and the entirety of the major leagues is Phil Hughes with a total of 11.63 in 2014.) Martínez held opposing hitters to a slash line of .167/.213/.259 and recorded more than twice as many strikeouts (284) as hits allowed (128). When opposing teams had runners in scoring position, hitters' production against Martínez was reduced to a slash line of .133/.188/.219.

Across 1999 and 2000, Martínez allowed 288 hits and 69 walks in 430 innings, with 597 strikeouts, a 0.83 WHIP, and a 1.90 ERA. Some baseball pundits believe that given the era in which Martínez pitched—during the peak of the Steroid Era, in a league with a designated hitter, with hitter-friendly Fenway Park as his home field—his performance represents the peak for any pitcher in baseball history.

Though he continued his dominance when healthy, carrying a sub-2.00 ERA to the midpoint of the following season, Martínez spent much of 2001 on the disabled list with a rotator cuff injury as the Red Sox slumped to a poor finish. Martínez finished with a 7–3 record, a 2.39 ERA, and 163 strikeouts in 116 innings. Healthy in 2002, he rebounded to lead the league with a 2.26 ERA, 0.923 WHIP and 239 strikeouts, while going 20–4. However, that season's American League Cy Young Award narrowly went to 23-game winner Barry Zito of the Oakland Athletics, despite Zito's higher ERA, higher WHIP, fewer strikeouts, and lower winning percentage. Martínez became the first pitcher since the introduction of the Cy Young Award to lead his league in each of those four statistics without winning the award. Martínez's record was 14–4 in 2003. He led the league in ERA (2.22), ERA+ (211), and WHIP (1.04) for the fifth time each and finished second to league leader Esteban Loaiza by a single strikeout. Martínez came in third for the 2003 Cy Young Award, which went to Toronto's Roy Halladay.

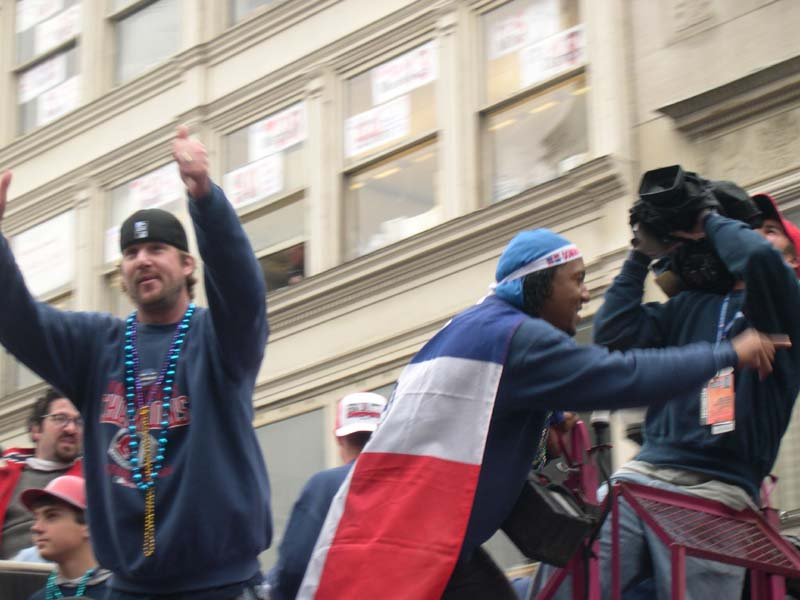
Derek Lowe (left) and Pedro Martínez at the Red Sox World Series Victory Parade in 2004.

Despite an uncharacteristically high 3.90 ERA in 2004, Martínez went 16–9, ranked second in the AL in strikeouts and finished fourth in Cy Young voting. The Red Sox won the American League's wild-card berth, and Martínez pitched effectively in the playoffs. He earned the win in Game 2 of the ALDS, and in the ALCS, he recorded his only loss of the postseason as well as a no-decision. In Game 3 of the World Series, he pitched seven shutout innings and retired the last 14 batters he faced. The Red Sox won the World Series in four games, securing their first championship in 86 years.

Martínez finished his Red Sox career with a 117–37 record (a .760 winning percentage), a 2.52 ERA, a 190 ERA+, and 1683 strikeouts in 1383 2/3 innings. He finished in the top four in Cy Young Award balloting in six of his seven years in Boston, winning twice.

=== New York Mets (2005–2008) ===
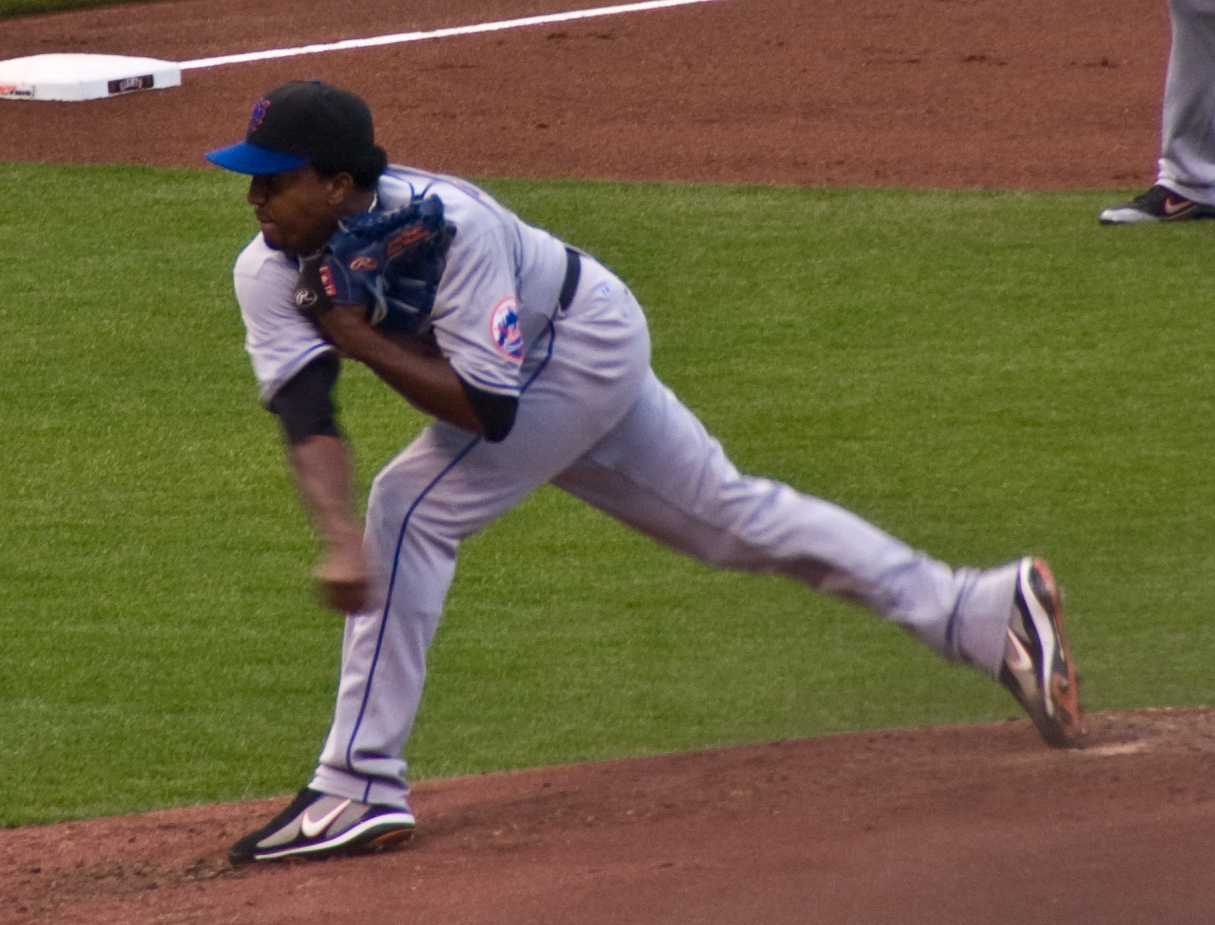
Martínez pitching with the Mets

After Boston's World Series triumph in 2004, Martínez became a free agent and signed a four-year, $53 million contract with the New York Mets. In 2005, his first season as a Met, Martínez posted a 15–8 record with a 2.82 ERA, 208 strikeouts, and a league-leading 0.95 WHIP. It was his sixth league WHIP title, and the fifth time that he led the Major Leagues in the category. Opponents batted .204 against him.

Martínez started the 2006 season at the top of his game. At the end of May, he was 5–1 with a 2.50 ERA, with 88 strikeouts and 17 walks and 44 hits allowed in 76 innings; Martínez's record was worse than it could have been, with the Mets bullpen costing him two victories. However, during his May 26 start against the Florida Marlins, Martínez was instructed by the umpires to change his undershirt. He slipped in the corridor, injuring his hip, and his promising season curdled. The effect was not immediately apparent; although Martínez lost the Marlins game, his following start was a scintillating 0–0 duel with Arizona's Brandon Webb. But after that, beginning on June 6, Martínez went 4–7 with a 7.10 ERA in a series of spotty starts interrupted twice by stays on the disabled list. A right calf injury plagued him for the last two months of the season. After Martínez was removed from an ineffective September 15 outing, television cameras found him in the Mets dugout, apparently crying. Subsequent MRI exams revealed a torn muscle in Martínez's left calf and a torn rotator cuff. Martínez underwent surgery which sidelined him for most of the 2007 season.

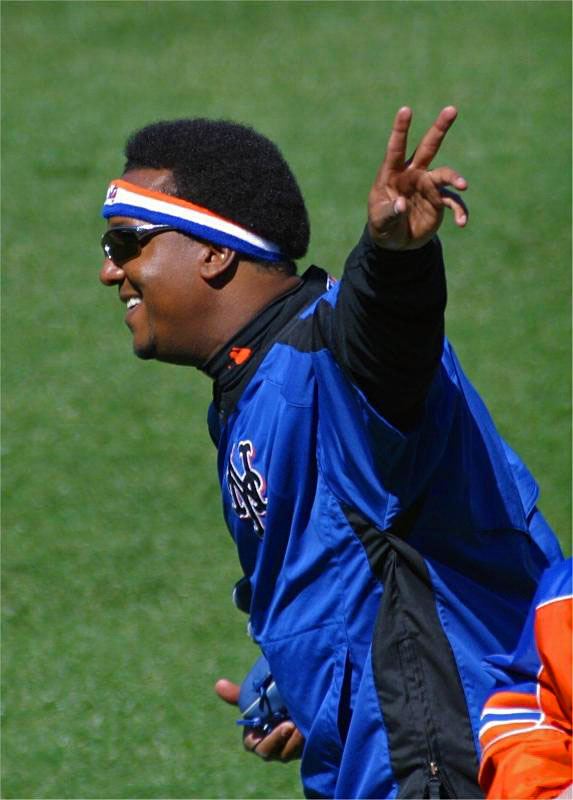
Martínez with the Mets

On November 3, 2006, Martínez stated that if he could not return to full strength, he might end up retiring after the 2007 season. "It's getting better, and progress is above all what is hoped for", Martínez told the Associated Press. "To go back, I have to recover, I have to be healthy. But if God doesn't want that, then I would have to think about giving it all up." Martínez added, "It's going to be a bitter winter because I am going to have to do a lot of work. The pain I feel was one of the worst I have felt with any injury in my career." But by December 30, 2006, Martínez was more optimistic: "The progress has been excellent. I don't have problems anymore with my reach or flexibility, and so far everything is going very well. The problem has to do with the calcification of the bone that was broken with the tear, and that had to be operated on. You have to let it run its course." Martínez also reported bulking up as part of his recuperative regimen: "I've put on about 10 pounds of muscle, because that's one of our strategies."

On September 3, 2007, Martínez returned from the disabled list with his 207th career win, allowing two earned runs in five efficient innings and collecting his 3,000th career strikeout, becoming the 15th pitcher to do so. "I thought I was going to have butterflies and like that", said Martínez, "but I guess I'm too old." Martínez's comeback was considered a great success, as the right-hander went 3–1 in five starts with a 2.57 ERA. But his last start was a crucial 3–0 loss to St. Louis in the final week of the 2007 Mets' historic collapse; Martínez provided a good pitching performance (7 IP, 2 ER, 7 H, 1 BB, 8 K) but his teammates failed to score.

Martínez became just the fourth pitcher to reach 3,000 strikeouts with fewer than 1,000 walks (in Martínez's case, 701). Ferguson Jenkins, Greg Maddux and Curt Schilling had previously done likewise. Martínez also joined Nolan Ryan and Randy Johnson to become the third 3,000-strikeout pitcher to have more strikeouts than innings pitched, and is also the first Latin American pitcher to have 3,000 strikeouts.

His unexpectedly strong finish in 2007 raised hopes, but 2008 was a lost season for Martínez. He was injured just four innings into his first game of the season, an April 1 no-decision against the Florida Marlins. He later told reporters he'd felt a "pop" in his left leg. Martínez was diagnosed with a strained hamstring and did not return to action for more than two months. Following his return, his fastball typically topped out in the 90–91 mph range, a lower velocity than he'd had during his prime but slightly higher than in recent seasons. Martínez finished the season on a low note, losing all three of his decisions in September en route to a 5–6 record, the first losing record of his career. (Martínez was 0–1 in two appearances in 1992.) His 5.61 ERA and 1.57 WHIP were also Martínez's worst ever, and for the first time in his career, he failed to strike out at least twice as many batters as he walked (87–44).

During his four-year Met contract, Martínez was 32–23 in 79 starts, with a 3.88 ERA and a 1.16 WHIP.

=== Philadelphia Phillies (2009) ===
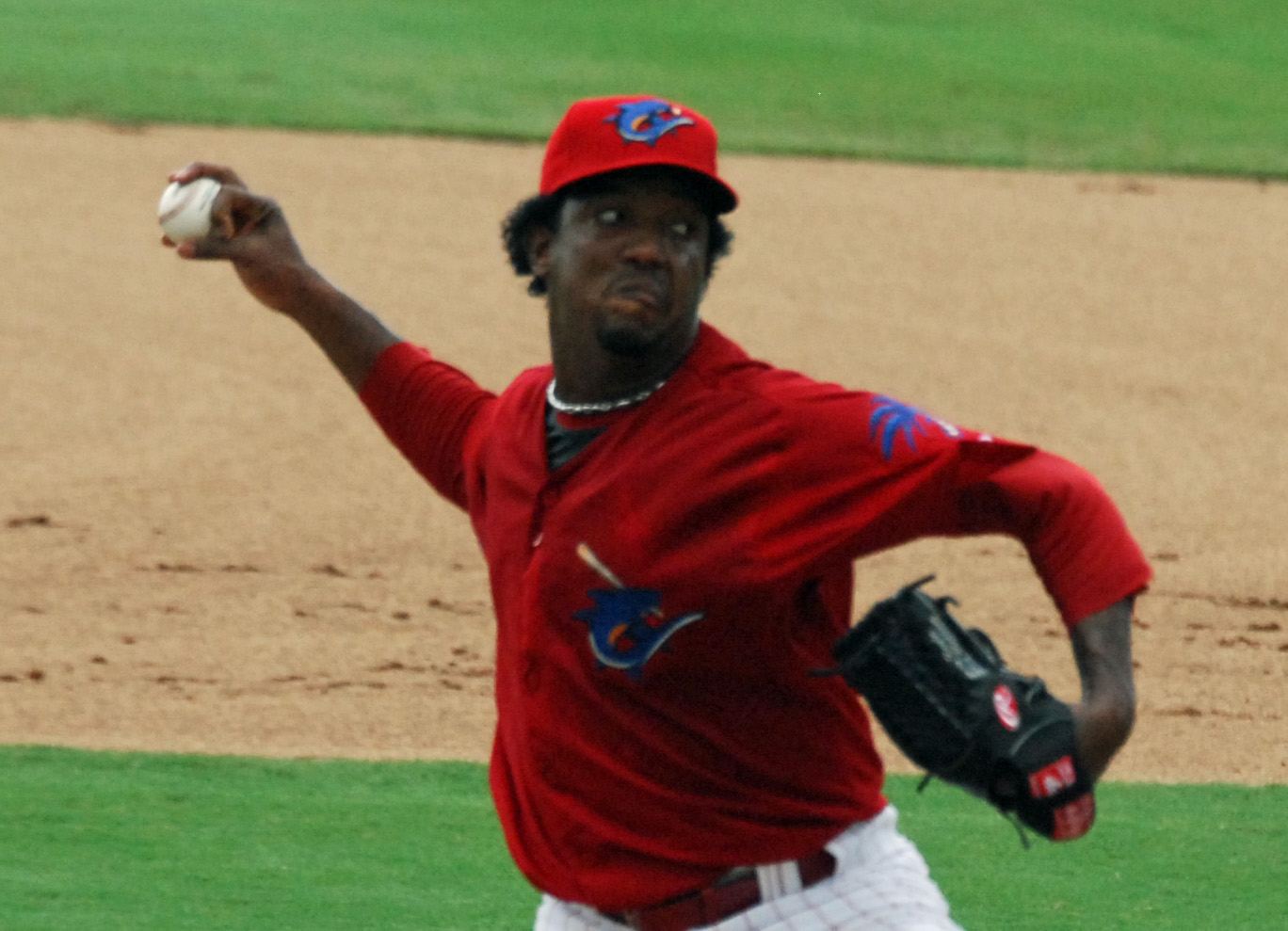
Martínez with Clearwater Threshers on July 26, 2009

A free agent, Martínez did not sign with a major league team during the winter. In March, he joined the Dominican Republic's squad for the 2009 World Baseball Classic, in an attempt to showcase his arm. Martínez pitched six scoreless innings with 6 strikeouts and no walks, but the team was quickly eliminated from the tournament and no MLB contract was forthcoming. In July 2009, Phillies scouts evaluated Martínez in two simulated games against the Phillies DSL team, leading to a one-year, $1-million contract. Martínez told reporters, "I would just like to be the backup. If I could be the backup, that would be a great thing to have—a healthy Pedro behind everybody else, in case something happens. That would be a great feeling to have on a team, eh?"

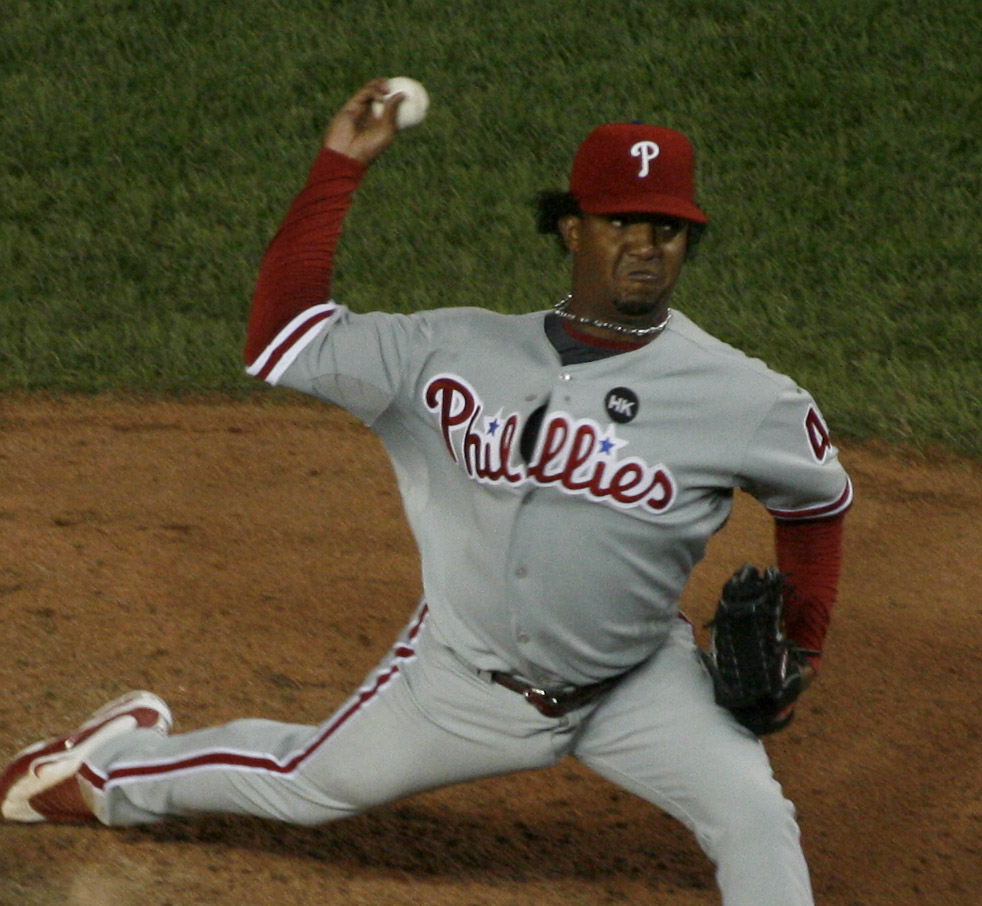
Martínez pitching during his brief stint with the Phillies in 2009

Replacing Jamie Moyer as a starter in the Phillies rotation on August 12, Martínez won his 2009 debut. In his return to New York on August 23, Martínez's win against the Mets was preserved by a rare unassisted triple play by second baseman Eric Bruntlett in the bottom of the ninth inning. With his win on September 3—his third as a Philadelphia Phillie and his 100th as a National Leaguer—Martínez became the 10th pitcher in history to win at least 100 games in each league. On September 13, Martínez pitched eight innings to beat the Mets again, by a final score of 1–0. His 130 pitches were the most he had thrown in a game since the ALDS in October 2003. Philadelphia won each of Martínez's first seven starts, the first time in franchise history that this had occurred with any debuting Phillies pitcher. In the NLCS against the Los Angeles Dodgers, he pitched seven shutout innings while allowing just two hits, but the Philadelphia bullpen faltered in the following inning, costing Martínez the win.

Intense media interest preceded Martínez's "return to Yankee Stadium" in Game 2 of the World Series. At the pre-game press conference, he seemed to relish the attention, telling reporters, "When you have 60,000 people chanting your name, waiting for you to throw the ball, you have to consider yourself someone special, someone that really has a purpose out there." Martínez pitched effectively in his second-ever World Series start, but left the game in the 7th inning trailing, 2–1, and wound up taking the loss. Before his second start of the Series, Martínez called himself and opposing pitcher Andy Pettitte "old goats", and acknowledged that Red Sox fans were rooting for him: "I know that they don't like the Yankees to win, not even in Nintendo games." However, Martínez allowed four runs in four innings, falling to 0–2 as the Phillies lost the sixth game and the 2009 World Series to the New York Yankees.

Following the Series, Martínez announced that he had no intention of retiring, but the 2010 season came and went without his signing with a team. Media reports surfaced that the Phillies had been discussing a deal to bring Martínez back for another half-season, but Martínez's agent announced in July that he would not be pitching at all in 2010, while remaining interested in a 2011 return. In December 2010, Martínez told a reporter for El Día "I'm realizing what it is to be a normal person. ... It's most likely that I don't return to active baseball ... but honestly I don't know if I'll definitively announce my retirement." The pitcher received some initial inquiries during the winter, but did not sign with any team for 2011. On December 4, 2011, he officially announced his retirement.

In December 2009, Sports Illustrated named Martínez as one of the five pitchers in the starting rotation of its MLB All-Decade Team. In February 2011, the Smithsonian's National Portrait Gallery announced that it had acquired an oil painting of Martínez for its collection.

== Post-playing career ==
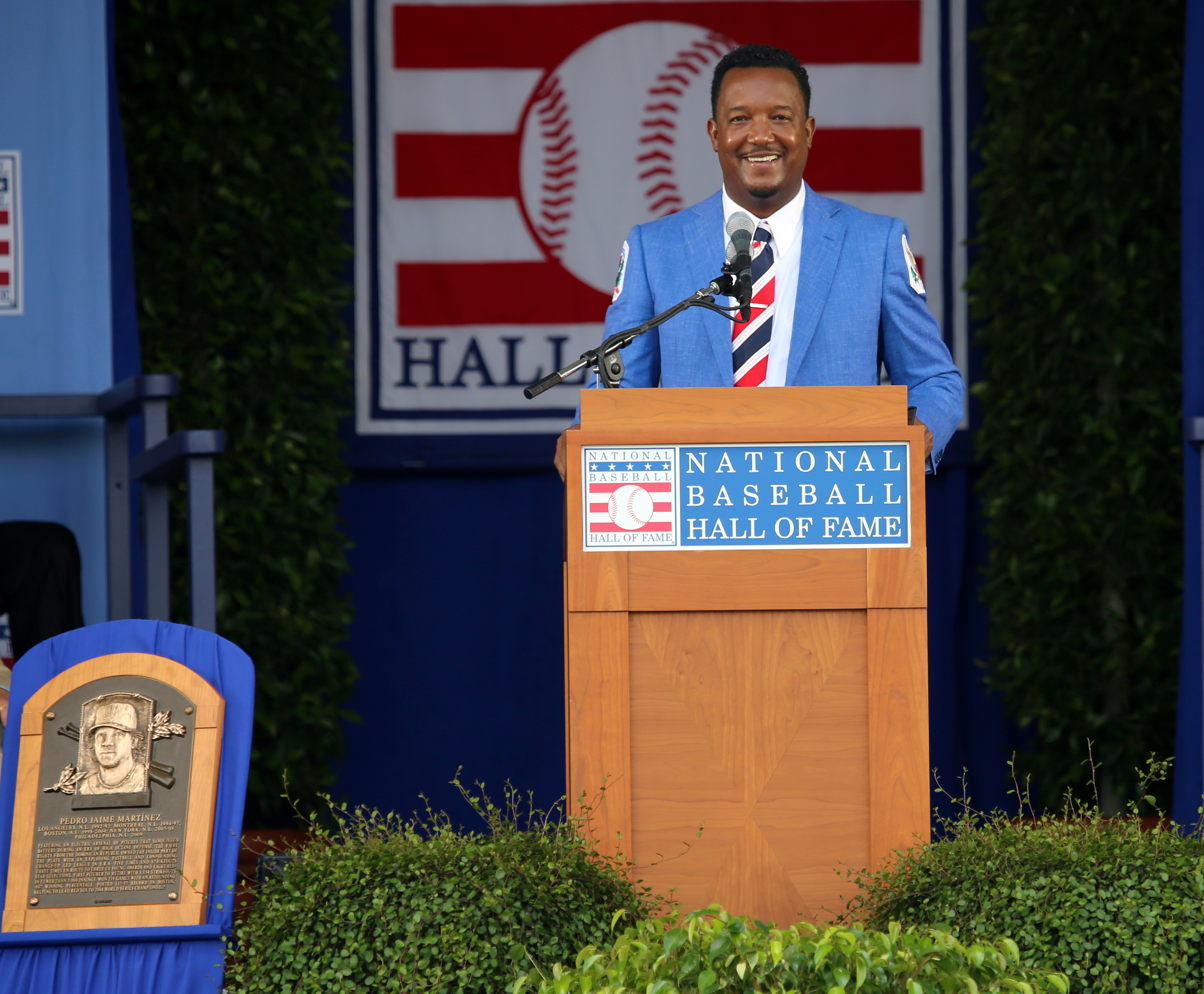
Martínez speaking at the National Baseball Hall of Fame in 2015

On January 24, 2013, Martínez joined the Boston Red Sox as a special assistant to general manager Ben Cherington.

Martínez was elected to the National Baseball Hall of Fame in January 2015 with 91.1% of the vote. His Hall of Fame plaque has him wearing a Boston Red Sox cap. "I cannot be any prouder to take Red Sox Nation to the Hall of Fame with the logo on my plaque", Martínez said in a statement. "I am extremely proud to represent Boston and all of New England with my Hall of Fame career. I'm grateful to all of the teams for which I played, and especially fans, for making this amazing honor come true."

Martínez has worked on MLB on TBS since 2013 as a studio analyst for postseason coverage. He has also worked on the MLB Network since 2015 as a studio analyst. Also in 2015, he released an autobiography, Pedro, which he co-authored with Michael Silverman of the Boston Herald. Reflecting on his career, he named Barry Bonds, Edgar Martínez, Derek Jeter, Kenny Lofton and Ichiro Suzuki as the most difficult hitters he had to face. All-Stars Sandy Alomar Jr., Moisés Alou, Carlos Beltrán, Carlos Delgado, David Ortiz, Dean Palmer, Alex Rodriguez and Alfonso Soriano have named Martínez as the toughest pitcher they ever had to face.

On June 22, 2015, it was announced that Martínez's number 45 would be retired by the Red Sox on July 28, two days after his Hall of Fame induction. Red Sox principal owner John Henry stated, "to be elected into the Baseball Hall of Fame upon his first year of eligibility speaks volumes regarding Pedro's outstanding career, and is a testament to the respect and admiration so many in baseball have for him."

On February 1, 2018, Martínez was announced as part of the 2018 induction class for the Canadian Baseball Hall of Fame.

== Memorable games ==
=== Imperfect hit-by-pitch ===
On April 13, 1994, in his second start as a Montreal Expo, Martínez lost a perfect game with one out in the eighth inning when he hit Cincinnati's Reggie Sanders with a pitch. An angered Sanders charged the mound, and threw Martínez to the ground, before both teams cleared the benches and broke up the fight. Sanders was later ridiculed in the press for assuming that a pitcher would abandon a perfect game in order to hit a batter intentionally. Martínez allowed a leadoff single in the ninth inning, breaking up his no-hitter, and was removed for reliever John Wetteland (who loaded the bases, then allowed two sacrifice flies, thus saddling Martínez with a no-decision). Three years later, in 1997, Martínez had a one-hitter against the Reds; the one hit came in the fifth inning.

=== Nine perfect innings ===
On June 3, 1995, while pitching for Montreal, he retired the first 27 Padres hitters he faced. However, the score was still tied 0–0 at that point and the game went into extra innings. The Expos scored a run in the top of the 10th, but Martínez surrendered a double to the 28th batter he faced, Bip Roberts. Expos manager Felipe Alou then removed Martínez from the game, bringing in reliever Mel Rojas, who retired the next three batters. Martínez officially recorded neither a perfect game nor a no-hitter. Until 1991, the rules would have judged it differently; however, a rule clarification specified that perfect games, even beyond nine innings, must remain perfect until the game is completed for them to be considered perfect. This retroactively decertified many no-hit games, including Ernie Shore's perfect relief stint in 1917 and Harvey Haddix's legendary 12 perfect innings in 1959 (lost in the 13th).

=== All-Star strikeout streak ===
Martínez was selected as the starting pitcher for the American League All-Star team in 1999. The game, on July 13, was at Fenway Park, Martínez' home field. Martínez struck out Barry Larkin, Larry Walker, and Sammy Sosa consecutively in the first inning. He then struck out Mark McGwire leading off the second, becoming the first pitcher to begin an All-Star game by striking out the first four batters. (The National League's Brad Penny matched the feat in 2006.) The next batter, Matt Williams, managed to reach first base from an error by Roberto Alomar. Martínez then proceeded to strike out Jeff Bagwell while Williams was caught stealing.

=== Yankee Stadium one-hitter ===
Martínez again came close to a perfect game on September 10, 1999, when he beat the New York Yankees, 3–1. He faced just 28 batters while striking out 17 and walking none (Martínez hit the Yankees' first batter, Chuck Knoblauch, but he was then caught stealing). Only a solo home run by Chili Davis separated Martínez from a no-hitter. The Davis home run came in the second inning, eliminating any suspense, but sportswriter Thomas Boswell called it the best game ever pitched at Yankee Stadium. Martínez retired the last 22 batters he faced in a row during this game. Over the last 3 2/3 innings, (11 batters), Martínez threw 53 consecutive pitches without allowing a base runner, and without a single ball being put in play. (Nine strikeouts, two foul-ball fly outs.) The Yankees managed only one fair ball out of his last 70 pitches after the fourth inning.

=== Hitless clincher ===
On October 11, 1999, in Game 5 of the ALDS, Charles Nagy started for Cleveland and Bret Saberhagen started for Boston, both on only three days' rest. Boston jumped out to a quick two-run lead in the top of the first inning, but Cleveland responded with three runs of their own in the bottom half of the inning. The hitting continued, knocking Saberhagen out of the game in the second inning having allowed five runs, and then Nagy out of the game after only finishing only three innings and allowing eight runs. Going into the fourth inning, manager Jimy Williams opted to replace Derek Lowe with the ailing Martínez, who had left Game 1 with a back injury. This decision would prove to be wise, as Martínez threw six hitless innings in relief to win and clinch the ALDS.

=== 1999 ALCS ===
Game 3 of the American League Championship Series was the long-anticipated matchup between Martínez and Roger Clemens. The Red Sox scored first. After a leadoff triple by Offerman, Valentin homered to put the Red Sox ahead 2–0. The onslaught continued as the Red Sox scored in all but two innings. Clemens was done in the third inning and the Red Sox would go on to win 13–1 and make the series two games to one. When Clemens was knocked out, Red Sox fans chanted "Where is Roger?" and then a response chant of "In the Shower". Martínez struck out 12 Yankees in seven scoreless innings and allowing just two hits, to beat Red Sox nemesis Roger Clemens and the New York Yankees in Game 3, handing the World Champions their only loss of the 1999 postseason. Martínez finished 1999 with a streak of 17 scoreless innings in the playoffs.

=== Faceoff vs. Roger Clemens on ESPN ===
On May 28, 2000, Martínez and Roger Clemens had a dramatic duel on ESPN's "Sunday Night Baseball" telecast. Both pitchers excelled, combining to allow only nine hits and one walk while striking out 22. A scoreless game was finally broken up in the ninth inning by Trot Nixon's home run off Clemens. In the bottom of the ninth, the Yankees loaded the bases against a tiring Martínez, but New York could not score, as Martínez completed the shutout.

=== Another close call ===
On August 29, 2000, Martínez took a no-hitter into the 9th against the Tampa Bay Devil Rays, losing it on a leadoff single by John Flaherty. Martínez had begun the night by hitting the leadoff batter, Gerald Williams, in the hand. Williams started towards first base before charging the mound and knocking down Martínez; in the scrum, Williams was tackled by Boston catcher Jason Varitek. Martínez then retired the next 24 hitters in a row until allowing Flaherty's single, and finished with a one-hitter. He had 13 strikeouts and no walks in the game; the Flaherty single would have broken up a perfect game, if not for the leadoff hit batsman. Martínez never threw an official no-hitter. However, he has professed a lack of interest in the matter: "I think my career is more interesting than one game."

=== Martínez vs. Zimmer ===
In the testy Game 3 of the 2003 ALCS, after allowing single runs in the 2nd, 3rd, and 4th innings, Martínez hit Yankees right fielder Karim García near the shoulders with a pitch, sparking a shouting match between Martínez and the New York bench. Directing his attention at Yankees catcher Jorge Posada, Martínez jabbed a finger into the side of his own head, which some, including an enraged Yankee bench coach Don Zimmer, interpreted as a threatened beanball. Emotions remained high in the bottom of the inning, which was led off by Boston slugger Manny Ramírez. Ramírez became irate over a high pitch from Roger Clemens, and both benches cleared. During the ensuing commotion, the 72-year-old Zimmer ran onto the field and started straight for Martínez; as he charged, Martínez grabbed Zimmer by the head and threw him to the ground. Later, Martínez claimed that he was not indicating that he would hit Posada in the head, but that he would remember what Posada was saying to him. In 2009, Martínez stated that he regretted the incident but denied being at fault. Zimmer did not give much credence to Martínez's statements. Martínez wrote in 2015 that the altercation with Zimmer was his only regret in his entire career.

=== Grady Little's visit ===
Martínez was also on the mound for Game 7 of the 2003 ALCS versus the Yankees. With the Red Sox ahead 5–2 at the start of the 8th inning, a tiring Martínez pitched his way into trouble. He was visited on the mound by manager Grady Little, but was left in to pitch, in a controversial non-move. The Yankees tied the score against Martínez in that inning on four successive hits, leading to a dramatic extra-inning, series-ending victory for New York, costing Grady Little his job with the Red Sox as his contract was not renewed.

=== World Series debut ===
After a comparatively lackluster season in 2004 (though still a solid season by general standards), Martínez got the win in Game 3 of the World Series. He shut out the St. Louis Cardinals through seven innings, recording his final 14 outs consecutively in what would turn out to be his last game for Boston.

=== Mets ===
With the Mets, on April 10, 2005, at Turner Field, Martínez outdueled John Smoltz, pitching a two-hit, one-run, complete game en route to his first Mets victory. On August 14, 2005, against the Dodgers, he pitched 7 1/3 hitless innings, but ended up losing the no-hitter and the game.

=== Return to Fenway ===
In June 2006, the Mets played an interleague series against the Red Sox, which was Martínez's first appearance at Fenway Park since leaving the team. The Red Sox gave their former ace a two-minute video tribute on June 27, but showed no courtesies to Martínez the following night. In his June 28, 2006 start, Martínez lasted only three innings, and was rocked for eight runs (six earned) on seven hits, losing his worst game as a Met just before going onto the disabled list. It was Martínez's only career appearance against the Red Sox, the only Major League team against which he did not record a victory.

=== Who's Your Daddy? ===
In both the 2004 ALCS and the 2009 World Series, Martínez was greeted with the chant "Who's your daddy?" from New York Yankees fans whenever Martínez was pitching due to his statement on September 24, 2004, saying, "I mean what can I say? Just tip my hat and call the Yankees my daddy."

== Pitching style ==
Martínez's four-seam fastball, power curveball, cutter, sinker, and circle changeup were all well above average; combined with his historically excellent control, they proved to be an overpowering package. Martínez threw from a low three-quarters position (nearly sidearm) that hid the ball very well from batters, who have remarked on the difficulty of picking up Martínez's delivery. Additionally, Martínez threw three different types of fastballs - a straight high-velocity four-seam fastball he used to overpower hitters, a two-seamer that ran to his throwing arm side, and a cut fastball that ran away from his throwing arm side - each with the pinpoint control that defined him.

Early in his career, Martínez's fastball was consistently clocked in the 95–98 mph range. Using it in combination with his devastating changeup and occasionally mixing in his curveball, he was as dominant a pitcher as the game has ever seen. Sports Illustrated's Joe Posnanski wrote, "There has never been a pitcher in baseball history—not Walter Johnson, not Lefty Grove, not Sandy Koufax, not Tom Seaver, not Roger Clemens—who was more overwhelming than the young Pedro."

As injuries and the aging process took their toll, Martínez made the adjustment to rely more on finesse than power. His fastball settled into the 85–88 mph range, although he was occasionally able to reach 90–91 mph when the need arose. Martínez continued to use a curveball, a circle changeup, and an occasional slider. With his command of the strike zone, he remained an effective strikeout pitcher despite the drop in velocity. Baseball historian Bill James described Martínez as being substantially more effective than his pitching peers due to his variety of pitches, pitch speeds, pinpoint control, and numerous modes of deception.

== Personal life ==
Pedro is married to former ESPN Deportes sideline reporter Carolina Cruz de Martínez, who now runs his charitable organization, Pedro Martínez and Brothers Foundation. He has four children. One of his sons, Pedro Martínez Jr., signed with the Detroit Tigers as an international free agent in September 2017. Another son, Pedro Isaías Martínez, signed at Nova Southeastern University in Fort Lauderdale, Florida. Pedro Jr. now plays for the Malone Border Hounds of the Empire Professional Baseball League in Northern New York. He also has another son, Enyol Martínez, and a daughter, Nayla Martínez. Pedro has been a naturalized American citizen since 2006.

== See also ==
- Major League Baseball titles leaders
- List of Afro-Latinos
- List of Major League Baseball annual ERA leaders
- List of Major League Baseball annual strikeout leaders
- List of Major League Baseball annual wins leaders
- List of Major League Baseball career hit batsmen leaders
- List of Major League Baseball career strikeout leaders
- List of Major League Baseball career wins leaders
- List of Major League Baseball pitchers who have thrown an immaculate inning

== Notes ==
Awards and achievements
Preceded by Tom Gordon	Boston Red Sox Opening Day; Starting pitcher 1998–2004	Succeeded by David Wells
Preceded by Tom Glavine	New York Mets Opening Day; Starting pitcher 2005	Succeeded by Tom Glavine
Preceded by David Wells	American League All-Star Game; Starting Pitcher; 1999	Succeeded by David Wells
Preceded by Darryl Kile	National League Pitcher of the Month; August 1997	Succeeded by Jeff Shaw
Preceded by Rick Helling; Mariano Rivera; Brad Radke; Mark Mulder	American League Pitcher of the Month; April–June 1999; September 1999; April 2000; May 2001; July 2002	Succeeded by Hideki Irabu; James Baldwin; Roger Clemens; Cory Lidle
